= List of Super Dragon Ball Heroes episodes =

Super Dragon Ball Heroes is a Japanese original net animation and promotional anime series for the card and video games of the same name. Similar to Dragon Ball GT, it is a manga-inspired installment of the Dragon Ball media franchise, created by Toei Animation instead of franchise creator Akira Toriyama. The opening theme songs for the season are "Universe Mission Series Theme Song" (episodes 1-20), "Big Bang Mission Series Theme Song" (episodes 21-28 and 30-40), "Fight Song" (episode 29), "Ultra God Mission Series Theme Song" (episodes 41-50), and "Meteor Mission Series Theme Song" (episodes 51-56). All the theme songs are performed by Dragon Soul which is composed of Takayoshi Tanimoto, Mayumi Gojo, and YOFFY. It premiered on July 1, 2018. Super Dragon Ball Heroes is presented with several alternate scenarios and possible outcomes.

The first part of the series from episodes 1-20 is referred to as Super Dragon Ball Heroes: Universe Mission (スーパードラゴンボールヒーローズ ユニバースミッション, Sūpā Doragon Bōru Hīrōzu Yunibāsu Misshon). The second part from episodes 21-40 is Super Dragon Ball Heroes: Big Bang Mission (スーパードラゴンボールヒーローズ ビッグバンミッション, Sūpā Doragon Bōru Hīrōzu Biggu Ban Misshon). The third part from episodes 41–50 is Super Dragon Ball Heroes: Ultra God Mission (スーパードラゴンボールヒーローズ ウルトラゴッドミッション, Sūpā Doragon Bōru Hīrōzu Urutora Goddo Misshon). The fourth part from episodes 51–56 is Super Dragon Ball Heroes: Meteor Mission (スーパードラゴンボールヒーローズメテオミッション, Sūpā Doragon Bōru Hīrōzu Meteo Misshon)

== Series overview ==
| Arc | Episodes | Originally released | |
| Arc | Episodes | First released | Last released |
|---|---|---|---|
| Prison Planet | 6 | July 1, 2018 | December 22, 2018 |
| Universal Conflict | 13 | January 10, 2019 | January 9, 2020 |
| Special I | 1 | February 23, 2020 | |
| Universe Creation | 11 | March 5, 2020 | February 25, 2021 |
| Special II | 1 | November 15, 2020 | |
| New Space-Time War | 8 | March 17, 2021 | December 18, 2021 |
| Supreme Kai of Time | 10 | February 23, 2022 | August 24, 2023 |
| Demon Invader | 6 | October 22, 2023 | August 8, 2024 |

== Episode list ==
=== Universe Mission ===
==== Prison Planet Arc (2018) ====
| No. overall | No. in arc | Title | Directed by (Note: Information is taken from the ending credits of each episode.) | Written by | Original release date |
|---|---|---|---|---|---|
| 1 | 1 | "Goku vs. Goku! A Transcendent Battle Begins on the Prison Planet!"; Transliteration: "Gokū Bāsasu Gokū! Kangoku Wakusei de Chōzetsu Batoru Kaimaku!" (Japanese: 悟空VS悟空！監獄惑星で超絶バトル開幕！) | Ryō Nanba | Atsuhiro Tomioka | July 1, 2018 |
Goku and Vegeta's training with Whis and Beerus is interrupted by the arrival of Future Mai, who tells them that Future Trunks has been captured. A mysterious figure emerges, introducing himself as Fu; he tells Goku, Vegeta and Mai that Future Trunks is trapped on a world called the "Prison Planet", a planet where warriors from alternate timelines and dimensions fight as part of an experiment conducted by Fu. The trio arrive on the planet and meet an alternate version of Goku, who is revealed to be part of a group called the Time Patrol. This Goku, referred to as "Xeno Goku", sees Fu and assumes that the trio are working for him; he immediately transforms into Super Saiyan 4 and attacks Goku, who reacts by transforming into Super Saiyan Blue. During the fight, Goku discovers that there is an invisible barrier around the Prison Planet that prevents them from escaping. The two Gokus engage in a Kamehameha clash, but their blasts cancel each other out. Fu deduces that Xeno Goku was trying to use the combined Kamehameha waves to break through the barrier, and explains that the Prison Planet is inescapable unless the group searches for a set of Dragon Balls (one of which is in Xeno Goku's possession) that they can use to escape. Fu disappears, and the two Gokus agree to work with each other to escape the planet. Meanwhile, Future Trunks is in a prison cell elsewhere on the planet. After escaping his cell, Future Trunks is confronted by Cooler, who demands a Dragon Ball from him. As Fu observes the planet, he tells a seemingly evil Saiyan that his time will come.
| 2 | 2 | "Goku Goes Berserk! The Evil Saiyan's Rampage!!"; Transliteration: "Bōsō Shita Gokū! Aku no Saiya-jin Ō-abare!!" (Japanese: 暴走した悟空！悪のサイヤ人大暴れ！！) | Yui Komatsu | Atsuhiro Tomioka | July 16, 2018 |
The evil Saiyan escapes his prison cell and attacks Goku, Vegeta and Future Mai. Goku and Vegeta attack the evil Saiyan, but his aura drives Goku berserk, causing him to attack Vegeta. Fu reveals that the evil Saiyan's name is "Cumber", and explains that his energy can turn people into a berserk state by just touching his aura. Goku continues attacking Vegeta; Future Mai is almost caught in the crossfire, but Future Trunks appears and saves her. Vegeta orders Future Trunks to fight Goku while he goes to battle Cumber, but he's interrupted by Cooler, who now appears to be working with Future Trunks. Cooler begins fighting Goku and transforms into his own Golden form, which he calls "Golden Cooler". Using this form, he defeats Goku, snapping him out of his berserk state and returning him to normal. Cooler then launches a Supernova attack at Cumber, but the evil Saiyan survives unscathed, breaks free of his restraints, and attacks the group once again. Future Mai reveals that the Supreme Kai gave her his Potara earrings before they left Beerus' world, and gives them to Goku and Vegeta. Future Trunks and Cooler distract Cumber, who easily defeats Future Trunks; however, this gives Goku and Vegeta enough time to fuse into Vegito. Vegito powers up to Super Saiyan Blue and prepares to fight Cumber.
| 3 | 3 | "The Mightiest Radiance! Vegito Blue Kaio-Ken Explodes!"; Transliteration: "Saikyō no Kagayaki! Bejitto Burū Kaiōken Sakuretsu!" (Japanese: 最強の輝き！ベジットブルー界王拳炸裂！) | Maya Asakura | Atsuhiro Tomioka | September 6, 2018 |
Just before Cumber can kill Future Trunks, Vegito transforms into Super Saiyan Blue and saves Future Trunks from the blast. When Cumber weakens Vegito, he transforms into Super Saiyan Blue Kaio-ken x20 and continues to fight Cumber while Cooler observes, noticing that the chains around the Prison Planet have begun to break due to Vegito and Cumber's fight. As Cumber prepares to fire a ki blast, Vegito attempts to counter it with a Final Kamehameha but fails. Cumber then creates an artificial moon and uses it to transform into a Golden Great Ape. In this transformation, Cumber attacks Vegito, who defuses back into Goku and Vegeta after using up too much energy. Goku and Vegeta then prepare to battle Cumber one last time.
| 4 | 4 | "Rage! Super Fu Appears!"; Transliteration: "Gekikō! Sūpā Fyū Tōjō!" (Japanese: 激昂！超(スーパー)フュー登場！) | Kana Shinohara | Atsuhiro Tomioka | September 27, 2018 |
Having defused back into Goku and Vegeta, Goku suggests cutting off Cumber's tail to revert him back to normal. As Cumber fires yet another blast at the Saiyan pair, Goku and Vegeta avoid it and fly directly upward, transforming into Super Saiyan in the process and attempt to get to Cumber's tail but even at his great size he proves to be swift enough to defend himself. As he steps on Goku, Future Trunks rushes in to help and tries to cut off the Golden Great Ape's tail with his sword but is struck hard to the ground. Vegeta and Future Trunks fire a volley of blasts at Cumber, but they do no damage to him. Even when Golden Cooler fires blasts of his own, Cumber is still unfazed. Meanwhile, Fu continues to watch the battle from his laboratory, smitten by the current events, until a nearby computer informs him of the damage to the Prison Planet's barrier and he decides to go to the battle himself to control matters. Goku still remains under the foot of Cumber, struggling to get free but is them seemingly crushed. However, Goku transforms into a Super Saiyan Blue and throws Cumber's foot off of him. Charging directly towards Cumber, Goku uses the Super Saiyan Blue Kaio-ken x20 and strikes Cumber in the face though he is unmoved. Goku fires a Kamehameha though the move is blocked. The ongoing battle causes the barrier to break down even more when suddenly Fu arrives, telling Cumber to watch what he's doing as he declares that he will rein him in. Fu powers up into an empowered state and gathers the energy from the artificial moon to his sword, before striking at Cumber and causing him to revert to his normal state. Cumber throws a punch at Fu but he easily avoids it. While the others comment on what he just did, Fu tells them to continue their battle as he teleports away, avoiding Cooler's blast in the process. Cumber powers up once more and Goku vows to take him on; he transforms into a Super Saiyan God, and Cumber appears to recognize it.
| 5 | 5 | "The Mightiest Warrior! Super Saiyan 4 Vegito!!"; Transliteration: "Saikyō no Senshi! Sūpā Saiya-jin Fō Bejitto!!" (Japanese: 最強の戦士！超(スーパー)サイヤ人4ベジット！！) | Yamazaki Kyōsuke | Atsuhiro Tomioka | October 28, 2018 |
Cumber and Goku's battle breaks the seal around the Prison Planet, while Fu is enraged to discover that his laboratory has been destroyed. Cumber defeats Super Saiyan God Goku and knocks him unconscious. Just before Cumber can kill Goku, Xeno Goku and Xeno Vegeta arrive as Super Saiyan 4s and save Goku. They challenge Cumber, who transforms into Super Saiyan 3, so Xeno Vegeta suggests that he and Xeno Goku use Potara fusion. They put on the earrings and fuse into Xeno Vegito. Xeno Vegito battles Cumber and manages to subdue him using a Kamehameha, before separating back into Xeno Goku and Xeno Vegeta. The resulting explosion breaks the seal completely. Fu returns, now furious over the destruction of his lab, and attacks Xeno Goku and Xeno Vegeta, who manage to block the attack. They then charge at Fu.
| 6 | 6 | "I'll Settle This!! Activation! Ultra Instinct!"; Transliteration: "Ora ga Keri o Tsukeru!! Hatsudō! Migatte no Gokui!" (Japanese: オラがケリをつける！！発動！身勝手の極意！) | Yui Komatsu | Atsuhiro Tomioka | December 22, 2018 |
The Prison Planet has been destabilized by the destruction of the shield. Fu battles Xeno Goku and Xeno Vegeta, but their fight is interrupted when Cumber recovers and returns to the battle, attacking everyone on the field. Satisfied that he has achieved his objective, Fu opens a portal and escapes. Cooler pursues him through the portal before it closes, stranding everyone else on the Prison Planet. Cumber launches a massive energy blast at the group; Xeno Goku, Xeno Vegeta, Vegeta and Future Trunks attempt to block it, without success. Suddenly, Goku awakens, reawakens Ultra Instinct, and easily deflects Cumber's blast. Goku begins fighting Cumber again, while Xeno Goku teleports the rest of the group to safety. Goku overpowers Cumber and finally defeats him, knocking him unconscious with a Kamehameha. Five mysterious figures suddenly appear in the sky; one of them reveals himself as Fusion Zamasu, now wearing an eyepatch over his right eye. Zamasu collects the unconscious Cumber before the group teleports away, leaving Goku alone on the Prison Planet as it explodes.

==== Universal Conflict Arc (2019–20) ====
| No. overall | No. in arc | Title | Directed by | Written by | Original release date |
|---|---|---|---|---|---|
| 7 | 1 | "Zamasu Revived?! The Curtain Rises On The Universal Conflict Arc!"; Transliteration: "Zamasu ga Fukkatsu!? Uchū Sōran-hen Kaimaku!" (Japanese: ザマスが 復活！？宇宙争乱編開幕！) | Tadayoshi Yamamuro | Atsuhiro Tomioka | January 10, 2019 |
The rest of the group from the Prison Planet have made it safely back to Beerus' planet, where they regroup with Whis. Xeno Goku and Xeno Vegeta return to their own universe, wishing the others good luck. Suddenly, the Supreme Kai of Universe 6 appears and informs the group that his universe has been invaded, and that Champa and the other Destroyers have not responded to his attempts to contact them. Vegeta declares that he will take care of these enemies. Meanwhile, in Universe 6, Hit, Cabba, Caulifla and Kale find themselves outmatched by the invaders: a pair of Tuffle Neo Machine siblings named Oren and Kamin, who were among the escapees from the Prison Planet. Oren and Kamin have the advantage due to their regeneration and their knowledge of their opponents' abilities, and are overpowering them until Vegeta and Future Trunks join the fray. Elsewhere, Zamasu discusses the situation with the group's leader Hearts, who reveals that their ultimate plan is to defeat the Omni-King. Vegeta and Trunks are able to turn the tables on Oren and Kamin, so they decide to reveal a secret technique.
| 8 | 2 | "The Ultimate Worst Warriors Invade! Universe 6 Demolished!"; Transliteration: "Saikyō Saiaku no Senshi Shūrai! Kaimetsu Suru Dai Roku Uchū!" (Japanese: 最強最悪の戦士襲来！壊滅する第6宇宙！) | Kazuya Karasawa | Atsuhiro Tomioka | February 24, 2019 |
Oren and Kamin suddenly convert their bodies into energy and possess Kale and Caulifla, using their bodies to attack the others. Vegeta, Trunks and Hit develop a plan; Trunks and Hit fight and immobilize Oren and Kamin, with the siblings forced to abandon their host bodies when Vegeta fires a Final Flash at them. Before the battle can continue, Hearts appears with a strange crystal and immobilizes all of them with his psychic powers. He reveals that the crystal is a Universe Seed, explaining that it will give him the powers to destroy the Omni-King, the Supreme Kais, and the Gods of Destruction. Hearts creates a strange crystal cube, which he uses to destroy a nearby planet, and prepares to do the same to the group of fighters, but Oren and Kamin insist on fighting them again. Zamasu also reveals himself, which shocks Trunks and Vegeta. Hearts reads Hit's mind, determining that he believes Jiren to be the strongest fighter in all the universes. Meanwhile, in Universe 11, Jiren and Toppo are facing off against Cumber. Elsewhere, it is revealed that Goku is alive and with the Grand Minister.
| 9 | 3 | "Goku Revived!! Strongest vs. Strongest Collide!"; Transliteration: "Gokū Fukkatsu!! Shōtotsu Suru Saikyō to Saikyō!" (Japanese: 悟空復活！！衝突する最強と最強！) | Takao Kiriyama | Atsuhiro Tomioka | March 7, 2019 |
Vegeta and Trunks arrive in Universe 11, and discover that Hearts and his gang are already there attacking. Oren catches the Saiyans off-guard and possesses Vegeta's body, gaining his immense power for himself. Trunks attacks Oren, but he is easily defeated. Meanwhile, Jiren is fighting Cumber: they appear to be evenly matched, so Cumber transforms into a Super Saiyan, but Jiren is still holding his own until Hearts appears and calls off the fight. Oren takes over fighting Jiren, while Hearts sends Cumber to attack Universe 3 instead. Kamin and Zamasu join the battle against Jiren; Trunks tries to help by attacking Zamasu, but Oren swiftly wins him again. Just as Oren is about to finish off Trunks, Goku arrives with the Grand Minister. The Grand Minister departs, and Goku demonstrates that he now has some control over Ultra Instinct. Zamasu tries to attack Goku, but Jiren intercepts him. Goku easily defeats Oren and Kamin, expelling Oren from Vegeta's body in the process, before turning his attention to Hearts.
| 10 | 4 | "Counterattack! Fierce Attack! Goku and Vegeta!"; Transliteration: "Hangeki! Mōkō! Gokū to Bejīta!" (Japanese: 反撃！猛攻！悟空とベジータ！) | Takao Kiriyama | Atsuhiro Tomioka | April 18, 2019 |
After freeing Vegeta's body from Oren's control, Goku confronts Hearts. Oren and Kamin attack Goku again, but he easily overpowers them both. Realizing that they can't beat Goku separately, the two fuse into "Kamioren" to take him on. Meanwhile, Jiren throws a massive energy blast at Zamasu, but Zamasu survives unscathed thanks to his immortality. As Goku is winning against Kamioren, Hearts uses his powers to launch a crystal from the Universe Seed at Goku. Unable to hold its shape under the pressure of Goku's and the Universe Seed's power, the crystal shatters and reveals a being called Lagss, the final member of Hearts' gang. Goku loses Ultra Instinct and reverts to his base form, exhausted by the effort of blocking the crystal. Lagss then uses the broken pieces of the crystal to injure him, slicing him repeatedly and knocking him out. With Goku unconscious and unable to continue the fight, Vegeta powers up to his evolved form of Super Saiyan Blue and gets ready to fight Kamioren.
| 11 | 5 | "Fierce Battle! Universe 11's Climactic Battle!"; Transliteration: "Gekitō! Dai Jūichi Uchū Chōjō Kessen!" (Japanese: 激闘！第11宇宙頂上決戦！) | Takao Kiriyama | Atsuhiro Tomioka | May 9, 2019 |
Vegeta begins fighting Kamioren, and seems to have the advantage. Lagss attempts to finish off Goku, but Trunks intervenes and takes her on instead. Vegeta begins winning against Kamioren, and defeats them with a Final Flash that forces Kamin and Oren to separate. Meanwhile, Jiren continues to overpower Zamasu and injures him, but Zamasu's injuries quickly heal. Lagss attacks Trunks with her glass crystals, but Goku knocks him out of the way and takes the attack himself. Hearts steps in and sends Lagss to join Cumber in Universe 3, before confronting Goku himself. He reads Goku's mind and discerns that he hasn't perfected Ultra Instinct yet but decides to try and draw out Goku's full power so that he can defeat him at his strongest. Goku, Trunks and Vegeta all attack Hearts, but he uses his psychic powers to immobilize them. Goku begins fighting to resist Hearts' powers, but Universe 7's Supreme Kai suddenly appears and rescues the three Saiyans. Hearts decides that the villains have absorbed enough energy from Universe 11, and that it's time for them to move on to their next target. Jiren tries to intercept them, but Hearts temporarily traps him inside a crystal cube and the villains escape, leaving Jiren and Toppo alone. Elsewhere, Fu is hidden in a new laboratory and has been observing the recent battles; he tells a robotic version of Cooler that it's now his turn to join the fray.
| 12 | 6 | "Super Warriors Gather! Universe 7's Decisive Battle!"; Transliteration: "Chō Senshi Shūketsu! Kessen no Dai Nana Uchū!" (Japanese: 超戦士集結！決戦の第7宇宙！) | Yui Komatsu | Atsuhiro Tomioka | June 22, 2019 |
Hearts, Zamasu, Oren and Kamin arrive in Universe 7 to destroy it, but are confronted by Goku, Vegeta, Future Trunks, Android 17 and Piccolo. Oren and Kamin head for Vegeta, but are intercepted by 17 and Piccolo, while Vegeta and Trunks take on Zamasu. Goku repeatedly attempts to attack Hearts but keeps getting pulled down by Hearts' gravity manipulation before he can get near him. Meanwhile, in Universe 3, Cooler, who is now a "Meta Cooler" cyborg, has defeated Lagss and is fighting Cumber. After having some difficulty with Cumber's Super Saiyan form, Cooler transforms into his Golden form and overpowers Cumber; he begins charging up three Supernova attacks to end the battle, but his systems begin to overheat. Cooler launches the blasts, knocking Cumber out, but his overheating circuits are damaged, and he is forced to retreat before he can finish Cumber off. Back in Universe 7, Oren and Kamin fuse into Kamioren and Hearts powers up as Goku stands up, ready to keep fighting.
| 13 | 7 | "Super Hearts Joins the Fight! An All-Out Earth-Shaking Battle!"; Transliteration: "Sūpā Hātsu Sansen! Daichi Yurugasu Zenkai Batoru!" (Japanese: 超(スーパー)ハーツ参戦！大地揺るがす全開バトル！) | Yui Komatsu | Atsuhiro Tomioka | July 11, 2019 |
After powering up, Hearts attacks Goku and their battle intensifies, with Hearts holding the advantage until Goku powers up to Super Saiyan Blue, after which they appear to be evenly matched. However, they both acknowledge that neither of them is fighting all-out yet. Goku is able to gain the upper hand and overpowers Hearts with a Kamehameha. Meanwhile, Trunks and Vegeta continue their battle with Zamasu, while Android 17 and Piccolo are able to catch Kamioren off guard, with 17 holding off their attacks while Piccolo charges up a Special Beam Cannon that wounds them. However, Kamioren regenerates and powers up wildly, enraged by the possibility that they could lose. Hearts gets back up and powers up again, using his control of gravity against Goku; Goku is able to withstand his attacks, so Hearts powers up even further.
| 14 | 8 | "The Menacing Universe Seed! Kamioren's Rampage!!"; Transliteration: "Uchū no Tane no Kyōi! Kamioren Bōsō!!" (Japanese: 宇宙の種の脅威！カミオレン暴走！！) | Takao Kiriyama | Atsuhiro Tomioka | July 28, 2019 |
After powering up, Hearts uses his gravity cubes to further enhance his strength and defeats Goku with a single blow. Meanwhile, Piccolo and 17 are able to injure Kamioren again; Kamioren appears to be off-balance, so Hearts decides to assist them as the Universe Seed is nearly ready. He shrinks the Universe Seed to a small size using his gravity cubes and implants it into Kamioren, causing them to undergo a monstrous transformation that increases their power even further. In this state, Kamioren easily defeats Piccolo and 17, so Vegeta and Trunks go to assist them. All four fighters attack Kamioren together, but are unsuccessful. Kamioren is about to finish off Vegeta, but Goku goes to help him and is able to reach Ultra Instinct again, allowing him to withstand Kamioren's attacks.
| 15 | 9 | "Send Kamioren Flying! Overwhelming! Ultra Instinct!"; Transliteration: "Buttobe Kamioren! Attō! Migatte no Gokui!" (Japanese: ぶっとべカミオレン！圧倒！身勝手の極意！) | Takao Kiriyama | Atsuhiro Tomioka | September 5, 2019 |
Goku begins fighting Kamioren, and the two seem to be fairly evenly matched in terms of power, until Goku transforms further into the mastered level of Ultra Instinct and easily deflects Kamioren's attacks. He overwhelms Kamioren with help from the others, damaging them with a Kamehameha and a barrage of energy blasts before shattering their core with a final punch, causing their body to disintegrate. Goku drops out of Ultra Instinct again, while Hearts expresses sorrow over the deaths of Kamin and Oren, before retrieving the now fully-charged Universe Seed from Kamioren's remains. Hearts begins absorbing the power of the Universe Seed, surrounding himself in a huge cloud of gravity cubes, which coalesces into a single gigantic cube. Meanwhile, Zamasu looks on in satisfaction, declaring that he had been waiting for this moment.
| 16 | 10 | "Zamasu vs. Universe 7! Ambition's End!"; Transliteration: "Zamasu Bāsasu Dai Nana Uchū! Yabō no Ketsumatsu!" (Japanese: ザマスVS第7宇宙！野望の結末！) | Takao Kiriyama | Atsuhiro Tomioka | October 10, 2019 |
Vegeta and the others try to attack Hearts while he is absorbing the Universe Seed, but Zamasu stands in their way as he reveals that he is only aiding Hearts so he can resume his scheme to exterminate all mortal life without the Zenos' interference. Zamasu overpowers Goku after quickly incapacitating the others, before Jiren and Hit arrive to join the fight, having been sent by their universes' Supreme Kais to deal with Hearts and his allies. Goku, Jiren, and Hit are about to attack Zamasu again when Hearts suddenly emerges from his enormous gravity cube, having assimilated the Universe Seed and its power into his body, and gaining a new form in the process. Hearts uses his new power to easily immobilize Zamasu, then traps him in another gravity cube and obliterates him completely after revealing that his goal is to destroy all the gods. The Grand Minister is disturbed after sensing Zamasu's death and Hearts' immense power, as Hearts proclaims himself to be "the Ultimate Godslayer."
| 17 | 11 | "The Ultimate Godslayer! Hearts is Born!"; Transliteration: "Kyūkyoku no Kamigoroshi! Hātsu Tanjō!" (Japanese: 究極の神殺し！ハーツ誕生！) | Takao Kiriyama | Atsuhiro Tomioka | October 27, 2019 |
Hearts launches a simultaneous attack on all of the Z-Fighters, who struggle to fight back. Goku powers up to Super Saiyan Blue and attacks him, but Hearts easily knocks him away and then uses a massive gravity attack to take down all of the fighters at once. As the others recover, Jiren and Hit go after Hearts again, while Goku suggests that he and Vegeta use the Fusion Dance to make themselves strong enough to take on Hearts' new power. Trunks, Piccolo, and 17 rejoin the battle to buy time, while Goku and Vegeta perform the dance successfully and fuse into Gogeta. The other fighters stand down for the time being, as Gogeta prepares to battle Hearts.
| 18 | 12 | "Super Decisive Battle! Gogeta vs. Hearts!"; Transliteration: "Chō Kessen! Gojīta Bāsasu Hātsu!" (Japanese: 超決戦！ゴジータVSハーツ！) | Takao Iwai | Atsuhiro Tomioka | December 21, 2019 (Note: Premiered on December 21 during Jump Festa, available on YouTube on December 22.) |
Gogeta powers up to Super Saiyan Blue and launches an attack on Hearts. As the fight gets more intense Hearts powers up to his maximum as well, but Gogeta takes no damage and quickly gains the upper hand. Hearts then uses his powers to pull a gigantic meteor into the Earth's atmosphere, infusing it with his own energy before launching it at Gogeta. Gogeta powers up and prepares to stop the meteor.
| 19 | 13 | "Perfect Conclusion! The Outcome of the Universal Conflict!"; Transliteration: "Kanzen Ketchaku! Uchū Sōran no Yukue!" (Japanese: 完全決着！宇宙争乱のゆくえ！) | Takao Iwai | Atsuhiro Tomioka | January 9, 2020 |
Gogeta launches an energy blast at the meteor, slowing it down and temporarily holding it in place. Hearts uses his full strength and overpowers Gogeta's blast, propelling the meteor forwards again, so Gogeta powers up even more, charges up a Kamehameha and fires it at the meteor instead. Trunks is worried that the Earth will be destroyed, as it appears that Gogeta is unable to match Hearts' full power, but Piccolo refuses to give up. Hit and Jiren join Gogeta and add their own blasts to the Kamehameha, increasing its power and ultimately shattering the meteor. Trunks, Piccolo, and 17 shield the Earth from the meteor's fragments, while Gogeta and Hearts engage in a final clash. Gogeta overpowers Hearts and delivers a finishing blow that shatters the Universe Seed embedded in Hearts' chest, causing his body to disintegrate. As he dies, Hearts explains that he was merely trying to free all mortals by defeating the Omni-Kings, as their power to destroy entire universes on a whim prevents mortals from ever being truly free. Hearts congratulates Gogeta and the others on surpassing their limits to defeat him, and then dies peacefully. Meanwhile, it is revealed that the Omni-Kings have been playing hide-and-seek with the Gods of Destruction throughout the battles, but the Grand Minister was observing the fight and thanks the heroes for defeating the threat. Elsewhere, Fu expresses his satisfaction with the outcome of the battle and declares that it is time for his next experiment to begin.

==== Special Arc I (2020) ====
| No. overall | No. in arc | Title | Directed by | Written by | Original release date |
|---|---|---|---|---|---|
| 20 | 1 | "Decisive Battle! Time Patrol vs. The Dark King"; Transliteration: "Kessen! Taimu Patorōru Buiesu Ankokuō" (Japanese: 決戦！タイムパトロールVS暗黒王) | Takao Iwai | Atsuhiro Tomioka | February 23, 2020 |
In another timeline, a war has been raging between the Time Patrol and an evil army from the Dark Demon Realm, led by the Dark King Mechikabura. The conflict between them has reached its final battle, as the Supreme Kai of Time, Chronoa, and a team of elite Time Patrollers (consisting of the Xeno counterparts of Goku, Vegeta, Gohan, Goten, Pan, and Future Trunks) have invaded the Demon Realm to deal with Mechikabura once and for all. Super Saiyan God Xeno Trunks and Super Saiyan 4 Xeno Vegito are battling against Mechikabura, while the others look on. Xeno Vegito overpowers Mechikabura, while Chronoa empowers Xeno Trunks' mystical Key Sword with her magic, enabling him to strike Mechikabura down. The Supreme Kai of Time then uses her magic to seal Mechikabura away, while her magical bird companion Toki-Toki uses his own magic to wash away the darkness of the Demon Realm and destroys the demons' palace. Chronoa thanks the Time Patrollers for their help, and they return home triumphant. However, it's revealed that just before the destruction of the Demon Realm, the Demon Queen Towa and her servant Mira sent Towa's child off into the timestream to save his life, and the child is revealed to be a young version of Fu.

=== Big Bang Mission ===
==== Universe Creation Arc (2020–21) ====
| No. overall | No. in arc | Title | Directed by | Written by | Original release date |
|---|---|---|---|---|---|
| 21 | 1 | "The Gods of Destruction Invade! The Beginning of a New Battle!"; Transliteration: "Hakaishin Shūrai! Arata Naru Tatakai no Makuake!" (Japanese: 破壊神襲来！新たなる戦いの幕開け！) | Masanori Satō | Atsuhiro Tomioka | March 5, 2020 |
In the Time Nest, headquarters of the Time Patrol, the Supreme Kai of Time informs Xeno Trunks and Xeno Pan that her mystical bird Toki-Toki has disappeared. She sends the two of them to find him, while also being worried about a supposed "Bird of Catastrophe" that has been released. Meanwhile, Toki-Toki has appeared on Earth in the main timeline, where Goku finds him while training with Vegeta, Gohan, Piccolo, Krillin, and Android 17. Xeno Trunks and Xeno Pan arrive and are happy to see that Toki-Toki is safe, with Xeno Pan explaining that his existence is very important for the inner workings of the multiverse. Suddenly, the group is interrupted by the arrival of all twelve Gods of Destruction. Champa identifies Toki-Toki and Beerus promptly attempts to destroy him, but Toki-Toki uses his magic to defuse Beerus' attack. Goku asks Beerus what's going on, and Beerus explains that he has received a premonition that a mysterious bird will appear in Universe 7 and destroy the entire multiverse. Xeno Trunks protests that this couldn't be possible, and Xeno Pan quickly escapes back to the Time Nest with Toki-Toki. Quitela, Champa and the other Gods of Destruction are angered by the mortals' defiance, and immediately prepare to destroy Earth in response, but Beerus tells them to stand down, saying that as Universe 7's God of Destruction, he will discipline the mortals himself. Goku, Vegeta, Xeno Trunks and the others all power up and prepare to fight against Beerus. Meanwhile, Fu observes the scene from an unknown location, saying that this is the start of his new experiment. He now possesses a strange, glowing tree, and a strange bird called "Doki-Doki", the true target of the Gods of Destruction, which appears to be an evil version of Toki-Toki.
| 22 | 2 | "Fu's Plan! The Threat of the Dreadful Universal Tree!"; Transliteration: "Fyū no Keikaku! Osorubeki Uchūju no Kyōi!" (Japanese: フューの計画！恐るべき宇宙樹の脅威！) | Masanori Satō | Atsuhiro Tomioka | April 9, 2020 |
Goku, Vegeta and Xeno Trunks are fighting against Beerus, while Gohan, Piccolo, 17, Krillin, and the other Gods of Destruction look on. Beerus has the upper hand, until their battle is interrupted by the arrival of Xeno Goku and Xeno Vegeta, who warn them that they need to stop the fight. Suddenly, a mass of giant tree roots appears in the sky around the Earth and begins draining the planet's energy. The other Gods of Destruction sense that the same thing is happening on other planets all over their own universes, with the affected planets eventually being consumed entirely. The other gods all rush back to their own universes to protect them, leaving Beerus, the Earth's heroes, and the Time Patrollers behind. They are then confronted by Fu, who is accompanied by Doki-Doki. Fu confirms that Doki-Doki is the "Bird of Catastrophe" that Beerus was worried about and explains that the tree roots are part of the Universe Tree, which grew from the Universe Seed that Hearts was developing. By draining energy from all twelve universes using the Tree, he claims that he will be able to create a new universe. Fu and Doki-Doki escape through a portal, while Krillin, Piccolo, and the other inhabitants of Earth begin to weaken as a result of the Tree's draining their energy. Beerus rises into the sky and powers up, shielding the Earth by allowing the Tree to feed on his energy instead; however, he warns the others that he will not be able to keep this up for long, and that he cannot destroy the Tree by himself. Xeno Goku and Xeno Vegeta teleport away to search for Fu elsewhere, while Goku, Vegeta, and Xeno Trunks head out in their own attempt to track him down.
| 23 | 3 | "Rematch with Formidable Foes! Turles and Bojack!"; Transliteration: "Kyōteki Saisen! Tāresu to Bōjakku!" (Japanese: 強敵再戦！ターレスとボージャック！) | Masanori Satō | Atsuhiro Tomioka | May 22, 2020 |
Fu and Towa meet with a group of villains – Meta Cooler, Turles, Bojack, Super Android 17, and a mysterious humanoid scientist known as Dr. W – on the Universe Tree. Fu reveals that he rescued all the villains from the moments before their deaths at the hands of the Z-Fighters and convinces them to help him in exchange for places in the new universe that he is creating. Meanwhile, Goku, Vegeta, Xeno Trunks and Xeno Pan are searching for Fu, when they are attacked by Turles and Bojack. The two villains reveal that Fu has been able to increase their power immensely, as they are now strong enough to fight on par with Goku and Vegeta's Super Saiyan Blue forms and have auras similar to Cumber's. As the battle rages, Xeno Trunks spots Fu observing the fight: Goku and Vegeta try to engage him instead, but Turles and Bojack block their way. Elsewhere, Xeno Goku and Xeno Vegeta arrive in Hell, and are confronted by the mysterious Dr. W.
| 24 | 4 | "Creeping Shadow! The Mysterious Man Dr. W!"; Transliteration: "Shinobiyoru Kage! Nazo no Otoko Dokutā Daburyū!" (Japanese: 忍び寄る影！謎の男Dr.ダブリュー！) | Masanori Satō | Atsuhiro Tomioka | June 30, 2020 |
Dr. W begins what he calls an "analysis" of Xeno Goku and Xeno Vegeta by attacking them with strange, teleporting energy blasts. They both power up to Super Saiyan 3 and engage him in combat, but he is able to hold them both off with his strange attacks and high-speed reflexes. After having difficulty overpowering him, they power up to Super Saiyan 4 and land a powerful combined blast on him; however, Dr. W deliberately takes their attacks head-on, and emerges from the smoke with a glowing golden aura identical to theirs. Having completed his analysis, he then opens a portal and escapes. Meanwhile, Fu is observing the battle between Goku, Vegeta, Turles and Bojack. He releases Doki-Doki, who generates waves of dark energy that immobilize Goku, Vegeta, Xeno Trunks and Xeno Pan. Toki-Toki tries to defuse the dark energy, but Fu traps him and throws him through a portal, before recalling Doki-Doki and escaping through one himself. Turles and Bojack also escape through portals, leaving the four heroes alone. Back in Hell, Dr. W delivers the data that he collected on Xeno Goku and Xeno Vegeta to a strange machine, which he refers to as "Janemba."
| 25 | 5 | "Big Decisive Battle in Hell! A New Janemba!"; Transliteration: "Jigoku Dai Kessen! Arata Naru Janenba!" (Japanese: 地獄大決戦！新たなるジャネンバ！) | Masanori Satō | Atsuhiro Tomioka | July 30, 2020 |
In Hell, Xeno Goku & Xeno Vegeta, both at Super Saiyan 4, struggle against the reborn Janemba, who is aware of all of their abilities and tactics, which enables him to easily overwhelm them both. Just when Janemba is about to finish them off, Goku, Vegeta, Xeno Trunks and Xeno Pan arrive in Hell through a portal and join the fight. Xeno Trunks powers up to Super Saiyan 3, while Goku and Vegeta both power up to Super Saiyan Blue. Super Saiyan Blue Goku and Super Saiyan 4 Xeno Goku then team up and drive Janemba back with a series of simultaneous attacks. Janemba is about to continue the battle, but the fight is interrupted when two mysterious figures interfere by knocking him away, enraging Dr. W. Xeno Trunks and Xeno Pan identify the new arrivals as Majin Salsa and Putine.
| 26 | 6 | "Dragon Fist Explosion! Super Full Power Saiyan 4: Limit Break!"; Transliteration: "Ryūken Sakuretsu! Chō Furu Pawā Saiya-jin Fō: Genkai Toppa!" (Japanese: 龍拳炸裂！超フルパワーサイヤ人4・限界突破！) | Masanori Satō | Atsuhiro Tomioka | August 27, 2020 |
Xeno Trunks identifies the new arrivals, Majin Salsa and Putine, as demons and old enemies of the Time Patrol. However, the demons offer to help the heroes in their efforts to destroy Fu's Universe Tree, warning that the Tree is continuing its work of consuming countless planets across the multiverse. Janemba attacks them all again before the two groups can come to an agreement, and the battle resumes, with Xeno Trunks powering up to Super Saiyan God. Majin Salsa suggests that Xeno Goku and Xeno Vegeta use a technique that they have employed in the past, so the other Saiyans all power up and channel their energy into the pair while the two demons hold off Janemba. By absorbing the others' energy, Xeno Goku and Xeno Vegeta break through their limits and achieve a higher level of strength, known as Full-Power Super Saiyan 4. They attack Janemba together, succeed in overpowering him, and are finally able to destroy him using their ultimate technique, the Double Dragon Fist. Dr. W flees by teleporting away, while the Saiyans and demons reconvene. Putine teleports the group away, promising to take them to the Universe Tree. Meanwhile, elsewhere in Hell, Hearts' spirit is locked up in a prison cell.
| 27 | 7 | "Rampaging Terror! The Return of Evil Aura!"; Transliteration: "Bōsō no Kyōfu! Aku no Ōra Futatabi!" (Japanese: 暴走の恐怖！悪のオーラ再び！) | Wataru Matsumi | Atsuhiro Tomioka | September 30, 2020 |
Goku, Vegeta, Xeno Goku, Xeno Vegeta, Xeno Trunks, Xeno Pan, Majin Salsa and Putine arrive on the Universe Tree, which is still absorbing energy from the multiverse. Vegeta attempts to destroy the Tree with a large ki blast, but it absorbs the energy instead. Fu then appears and confronts the group, informing them that he plans to create a new universe using the Tree. Xeno Goku, Xeno Vegeta, Xeno Trunks and Xeno Pan are suddenly teleported away by Towa; she tells Fu that she is doing something for him, and then teleports away along with Majin Salsa and Putine. Vegeta powers up to Super Saiyan Blue and attacks Fu, but Fu reveals that he now has access to Cumber's energy and channels Cumber's aura through his own body, using its effects to corrupt Vegeta's ki and drive him berserk. Goku tries to intervene, but Fu corrupts his ki as well; however, even in their berserk state, Goku and Vegeta refuse to fight each other and continue attacking Fu instead. Fu lands a solid hit on them both with his sword, which negates the effects of Cumber's aura and returns them too normal. As Fu waits for the Tree to finish developing, Goku and Vegeta use a pair of Potara earrings given to them by Majin Salsa and fuse into Vegito. Fu tries to corrupt Vegito too, but Vegito uses a barrier to repel his attack before powering up to Super Saiyan Blue.
| 28 | 8 | "Fierce Battle in the Space of Time! Vegito vs. Super Fu"; Transliteration: "Toki no Hazama no Gekitō! Bejitto Bāsasu Sūpā Fyū" (Japanese: 時の狭間の激闘！ベジットVS超(スーパー)フュー) | N/A | Atsuhiro Tomioka | October 25, 2020 (Note: Premiered on October 25 during the 2020 Big Bang Mission championship final qualifying round in the Chubu Area, available on YouTube on October 29.) |
In another dimension, Towa restrains Xeno Goku, Xeno Vegeta, Xeno Trunks, and Xeno Pan using Cumber's dark ki, and reveals that she created Fu using data from many previous Dragon Ball fighters and villains. She explains that her plan is to make Fu into the new Dark King using Mechikabura's "Dark Factor", which she stored in a dark energy orb upon his death. Xeno Goku manages to break free and attacks Towa, only to be blocked by Mira. Towa teleports Xeno Gohan and Xeno Goten into the dimension, both unconscious as their ki has been drained before, then teleports Mira and herself out before the dimension shatters, pulling all inside into a shadowy vortex. Meanwhile, Super Saiyan Blue Vegito is fighting Fu in the front of Universe Tree and seemingly getting the upper hand. Fu powers up to Super Fu and manages to land a blow, only to be blocked and further beaten by Vegito. Just then, the Universe Tree glows brightly, signifying its mature phase and creation of the universe Fu wanted, but it suddenly starts withering. It is revealed that Beerus, Champa, Whis, and Vados used the Super Dragon Balls to wish for the destruction of the Universe Tree's roots.

==== Special Arc II (2020) ====
| No. overall | No. in arc | Title | Directed by | Written by | Original release date |
|---|---|---|---|---|---|
| 29 | 1 | "Push Forward to the Battlefield – Dragon Ball Heroes"; Transliteration: "Tatakai no Basho e Tsukisusume – Doragon Bōru Hīrōzu" (Japanese: 戦いの場所へ突き進め ドラゴンボールヒーローズ) | Wataru Matsumi | Atsuhiro Tomioka | November 15, 2020 |
An isolated special episode, unrelated to the rest of the series. In this special, two normal teenagers, a boy and a girl, compete in the 10th anniversary championship of the game Super Dragon Ball Heroes, using a virtual-reality console which transports them into the world of Dragon Ball as their own avatars. Each avatar powers up to Super Saiyan Blue and is backed up by a team of fighters from the world of Dragon Ball: the boy is aided by Vegito, Yamcha, Xeno Trunks, Goku, Bardock, and Jiren, while the girl is aided by Gogeta, the Masked Saiyan, Broly, the Dark-Masked King, the Grand Priest, and Demigra. The two teams begin fighting each other; after a lengthy battle, the boys' team emerges victorious, and he is declared to be the new champion. However, three new avatars then appear to challenge the champion, aided by a team of Heles, Champa, Vados, Beerus, Whis, and Belmod. The new arrivals quickly gain the upper hand, but the champion's avatar and his team's version of Goku are both able to access Ultra Instinct, turning the tide. With his team backing him up, the champion is newly inspired and happily prepares to continue the game.

==== Universe Creation Arc (cont.) (2020–21) ====
| No. overall | No. in arc | Title | Directed by | Written by | Original release date |
|---|---|---|---|---|---|
| 30 | 9 | "Reborn Evil – Birth of Dark King Fu!"; Transliteration: "Yomigaeru Jaaku – Ankokuō Fyū Tanjō!" (Japanese: 蘇る邪悪 暗黒王フュー誕生！) | Keitarō Nakashima | Atsuhiro Tomioka | December 20, 2020 |
Fu is horrified by the Universe Tree's death, until Towa and Mira arrive to help him. Towa infuses Mechikabura's Dark Factor into Fu, dramatically increasing his power and causing him to undergo a transformation into the new Dark King. However, Fu expresses no interest in this, and begins using his new powers to restore the Tree instead. Vegito tries to stop him and their fight resumes, but Towa and Mira intervene to help Fu and buy time for him by attacking Vegito. Before Fu can finish restoring the Tree, however, a portal opens and Xeno Vegito emerges, now powered up to Full-Power Super Saiyan 4 and accompanied by the Demon God Demigra. Xeno Vegito attacks Fu, and the battle resumes. Meanwhile, in an unknown location, an alternate version of Broly awakens.
| 31 | 10 | "The Worst Limit Break! Broly Revived!"; Transliteration: "Saikyō no Genkai Toppa! Burorī Fukkatsu!" (Japanese: 最凶の限界突破！ブロリー復活！) | Wataru Matsumi | Atsuhiro Tomioka | January 20, 2021 |
Xeno Vegito begins fighting Fu; the two of them seem to be evenly matched, until Fu uses his dark magic to change the area around them. He manifests a large combat arena for them to fight in, and prepares to engage both Vegitos in battle, until the three of them are interrupted by the sudden arrival of the alternate Broly in his Legendary Super Saiyan form. Xeno Vegito overpowers Broly, until Broly also transforms into a Full-Power Super Saiyan 4. The main timeline's Vegito joins the fight, and the two Vegitos battle Broly together, but even the two of them together struggle against his monstrous power. Meanwhile, Fu uses his magic to fully revive the Universe Tree. The main-timeline Vegito continues fighting Broly, while Xeno Vegito goes after Fu, but the Tree suddenly releases a massive wave of light that engulfs Fu, Broly, and the main-timeline Vegito. Xeno Vegito narrowly escapes, while Majin Salsa, Putine, Dr. W, Turles, the captive Cumber, and Hearts' spirit body are all enveloped by the energy wave.
| 32 | 11 | "The Outcome of the Universe Creation – The Birth of a New World!"; Transliteration: "Uchū Sōsei no Yukue – Arata Naru Sekai no Tanjō!" (Japanese: 宇宙創成のゆくえ 新たなる世界の誕生！) | Keitarō Nakashima | Atsuhiro Tomioka | February 25, 2021 |
Xeno Vegito outruns the energy wave before it dissipates, leaving the area around the Tree unscathed; he returns to find Fu holding the miniaturized form of the new universe created by the Tree. However, Fu is disappointed by his creation, as the new universe is flawed because Fu had to use his own demonic power to refuel the Tree rather than the pure energy of a normal universe. A furious Xeno Vegito attacks Fu, determined to stop him from doing anything else, and their battle resumes. Towa challenges Demigra, but his female companion Robel takes her on instead, while Demigra uses a mystical technique known as "Time Labyrinth" to freeze both Xeno Vegito and Fu in time. Towa claims that Fu will be able to escape the frozen-time bubble, but Demigra is confident that he will not, and he teleports away with Robel. On Beerus' planet in the Seventh Universe, Whis and Vados sense the creation of the flawed new universe. Meanwhile, in the new universe, Goku awakens alone, in a strange, empty version of West City.

==== New Space-Time War Arc (2021) ====
| No. overall | No. in arc | Title | Directed by | Written by | Original release date |
|---|---|---|---|---|---|
| 33 | 1 | "New Space-Time War! The Ultimate Fierce Battle Begins!"; Transliteration: "Shin-jikū Taisen! Kyūkyoku no Gekitō Kaimaku!" (Japanese: 新時空大戦！究極の激闘開幕！) | Yashiro Nomiya | Atsuhiro Tomioka | March 17, 2021 |
A mysterious figure looks out over the new universe's version of West City. Nearby, Goku has been attacked by Frieza and Meta Cooler. In the process, he is contacted by Xeno Trunks, who is at the Time Nest with Xeno Pan, Xeno Gohan, Xeno Goten, and the Supreme Kai of Time. Xeno Trunks informs Goku that what Fu has actually created is merely a copy of the Seventh Universe; interestingly, any damage inflicted on the buildings in the alternate West City is also transferred over to the real West City. Goku tries to find a way to escape, but he is tracked down and attacked again by Frieza and Cooler. However, Hearts appears and rescues him. Goku is shocked, but Hearts explains that Demigra pulled his spirit body out of Hell, and that he wants Goku to help him destroy Fu for misusing the Universe Seed. Goku and Hearts form a tentative alliance against Frieza and Cooler, who both transform into their Golden forms. Hearts battles Cooler, while Goku briefly taps into Ultra Instinct and uses its power to subdue Frieza. However, a mysterious masked Saiyan with hair similar to Goku's appears and implants two red Dark Dragon Balls into Frieza and Cooler, granting them a significant powerup.
| 34 | 2 | "The Warrior in Black Appears! A New Adventure Starts!"; Transliteration: "Kokui no Senshi Arawaru! Arata Naru Bōken Sutāto!" (Japanese: 黒衣の戦士現る！新たなる冒険スタート！) | Wataru Matsumi | Atsuhiro Tomioka | April 15, 2021 |
Goku and Hearts struggle against the newly empowered Frieza and Cooler, until their battle is interrupted by the arrival of the alternate Broly in his Legendary Super Saiyan form. Broly attacks all four combatants, overpowering them all, as the masked Saiyan looks on. Suddenly, a mysterious cloaked figure arrives on the scene and attacks both Cooler and Frieza, removing the Dark Dragon Balls from both of them. Broly attacks the cloaked figure, who leads him away. Hearts reveals that he is unable to read the minds of either the cloaked figure or the masked Saiyan, who teleports away. Hearts gives Goku a duplicate Senzu bean to heal his injuries and reveals that duplicates of the normal Dragon Balls also exist in this universe. Goku theorizes that if they gather all of the duplicate Dragon Balls, they may be able to use them to escape. Using a duplicate of the Dragon Radar, they track one of the other Dragon Balls to a nearby planet. On that planet, the masked Saiyan observes Vegeta, Turles and Cumber, and orders them to begin fighting each other.
| 35 | 3 | "The Pride of the Warrior Race! Vegeta, Awakening!!"; Transliteration: "Sentō Minzoku no Hokori! Bejīta, Kakusei!!" (Japanese: 戦闘民族の誇り！ベジータ、覚醒！！) | Yashiro Nomiya | Atsuhiro Tomioka | May 9, 2021 |
On the unknown planet, Vegeta, Turles and Cumber begin fighting each other. Cumber temporarily disables Vegeta and continues fighting Turles, while Goku and Hearts arrive to help Vegeta. They are confronted by the masked Saiyan, who reveals himself as Goku Black; he powers up to Super Saiyan Rosé and begins fighting Goku. Turles tries to corrupt Vegeta's ki using the evil energy that he absorbed from Cumber, but Vegeta is able to resist the effects of the corruption and absorbs the dark energy for himself. Using this newly enhanced strength, Vegeta easily defeats Turles and then knocks Cumber unconscious with a Gallick Gun. He advises Turles to leave and train before challenging him again but is then horrified to see that Black has overpowered Goku and Hearts.
| 36 | 4 | "Super Saiyan Rosé vs. Ultra Instinct! A Great Planet-Shaking Duel!"; Transliteration: "Sūpā Saiya-jin Roze Bāsasu Migatte no Gokui! Wakusei Gekishin no Dai Kettō!" (Japanese: 超(スーパー)サイヤ人ロゼVS身勝手の極意！惑星激震の大決闘！) | Akihiro Nakamura | Atsuhiro Tomioka | June 20, 2021 |
Vegeta intervenes to protect Goku, but his new power runs out before he can deal with Black. Black reveals to Vegeta that he is an alternate version originating from before he was destroyed by Future Zeno: Fu told Black about his future, which prompted him to study Goku by fighting versions of him in 99 other timelines. Just before Black can kill Vegeta, Goku taps into Ultra Instinct and quickly overpowers Black. However, Black fires an energy blast into the planet, destabilizing it. Goku tries to teleport the others to safety but is unable to do so. Turles returns and attacks Black but is swiftly defeated and is seemingly killed. Suddenly, Cell appears (also in a spirit body) and saves Goku, Vegeta, Hearts, and the unconscious Cumber. Black also teleports away before the planet explodes. Goku and Vegeta interrogate Cell, who explains that he was pulled out of Hell by Demigra for the same reason as Hearts. Before Cell can explain the situation further, several mysterious figures appear that shock Goku and Vegeta.
| 37 | 5 | "The Warrior in Black vs. Goku Black! The Dark Plot Becomes Clear!"; Transliteration: "Kokui no Senshi Bāsasu Gokū Burakku! Akiraka ni Naru Yami no Takurami!" (Japanese: 黒衣の戦士VSゴクウブラック！明らかになる闇の企み！) | Keitarō Nakashima | Atsuhiro Tomioka | July 11, 2021 |
The new arrivals are revealed to be Gohan, Krillin, Android 17, and Android 18, who have been transported into the new universe. Majin Salsa and Putine also join the group, accompanied by Shurum, a former Demon God and an ally of Demigra, who helped to retrieve Cell and Hearts from Hell. Cell secretly vows to get his vengeance on the Z-Fighters for killing him; Hearts reads his thoughts but doesn't say anything to the others. Goku explains that he and Vegeta could defeat Black with Ultra Instinct and with Vegeta's new power, but that neither of them can properly control those powers yet. Shurum, Majin Salsa, and Putine open a portal to a pocket dimension similar to the Hyperbolic Time Chamber, which will give Goku and Vegeta some time to train and master their new powers. Shurum assures them that he has another partner who will keep Black occupied while they are training. Goku and Vegeta enter the pocket dimension, where they are confronted by shadowy duplicates of some of their past enemies. Elsewhere, Black observes the new universe, until he is ambushed by the cloaked figure from earlier, who reveals himself as a powerful Super Saiyan. The others prepare to go and help, but they are intercepted by Bojack, Super Android 17, and Dr. W, who reveals himself as Dr. Wheelo. Black powers up even further into a form resembling Super Saiyan 3 and defeats the cloaked Super Saiyan, but he is interrupted by the arrival of Goku and Vegeta, who have completed their training and mastered their full powers.
| 38 | 6 | "The Final Battle in Fake Universe! Clash of Blue and Scarlet"; Transliteration: "Uchū Modoki no Saishū Kessen! Gekitotsu Suru Ao to Aka" (Japanese: 宇宙モドキの最終決戦！激突する蒼と紅) | Keitarō Nakashima | Atsuhiro Tomioka | September 15, 2021 |
The cloaked Saiyan teleports away as Goku and Vegeta overpower Black; however, Goku drops out of Ultra Instinct, and Black powers up to his full strength by using his mask to absorb more energy from the false universe. In this new state, he swiftly defeats Vegeta. Frieza and Meta-Cooler arrive in their Golden forms and challenge Black, but he uses a mystical scroll to summon a Majin-powered version of Omega Shenron, who easily defeats them. Hearts and Cumber arrive and battle Omega, while Black makes short work of Frieza and Meta-Cooler: however, Goku and Vegeta use the opportunity to fuse into Gogeta and power up to Super Saiyan Blue. Gogeta and Black begin fighting, and Gogeta appears to have the upper hand until Black uses his mask's power to heal his injuries and continues powering up by absorbing more energy. Gogeta then powers up to his own maximum by accessing Super Saiyan Blue Evolved and easily defeats Black, finishing him off by shattering his mask. The destruction of Black's mask causes him to disintegrate, and Omega disappears along with him. The cloaked Saiyan then returns, having used the time the others bought him to assemble all seven of the false universe's Dragon Balls. He activates them, and Goku is suddenly teleported back to the Universe Tree, where he encounters a younger version of Fu.
| 39 | 7 | "The Obstructing Threat of Fu! Birth of the Miraculous Strongest Combination!"; Transliteration: "Tachihadakaru Fyū no Kyōi! Kiseki no Saikyō Konbi Tanjō!" (Japanese: 立ちはだかるフューの脅威！奇跡の最強コンビ誕生！) | Yūya Takahashi | Atsuhiro Tomioka | October 24, 2021 |
Fu reveals that his new, youthful appearance is a result of his merging with Doki-Doki, which allowed him to break free of Demigra's Time Labyrinth. Goku is joined by Vegeta, Xeno Goku, and Xeno Vegeta, the latter two having also escaped from the Time Labyrinth. The alternate Broly arrives and attacks the other Saiyans, but Hearts and Cumber arrive to intercept him. Goku and Vegeta fuse back into Gogeta, while Xeno Goku and Xeno Vegeta fuse into Xeno Gogeta; they then power up to Super Saiyan Blue Evolved and Full-Power Super Saiyan 4, respectively, before challenging Fu. They have the advantage at first, until Fu powers up even further and hits them with a massive ki blast that forces them to defuse. Fu then teleports Vegeta and Xeno Vegeta away, preventing the Saiyans from fusing again, before preparing to destroy Goku and Xeno Goku. The Supreme Kai of Time appears and saves the two Gokus from another blast, before using her powers to help them combine their energies. The two Gokus power up to maximum and their energies merge together, giving them a massive power boost as they prepare to battle Fu again.
| 40 | 8 | "The Last Full Power! Fierce Battle for the Future, Finally Settled!"; Transliteration: "Saigo no Furu Pawā! Mirai o Kaketa Gekitō, Tsui ni Ketchaku!" (Japanese: 最後のフルパワー！未来をかけた激闘、遂に決着！) | Yasushi Murayama | Atsuhiro Tomioka | December 18, 2021 |
Fu tries to shield himself with an energy barrier, but the two Gokus blast through it and land a powerful hit on him, although he survives. Fu begins draining energy from the Universe Tree to power himself up even further. Goku blocks one of Fu's attacks when he tries to kill the Supreme Kai of Time, but the Tree's energy begins overwhelming him: however, he's able to use his Spirit Bomb technique to absorb the Tree's energy for himself, cutting Fu off from it. Using the Tree's power, Goku gets the upper hand against Fu, and they engage in a final beam-clash. Thanks to the Tree's energy, Goku is able to overpower Fu's blast, and the resulting explosion kills Fu and drains all the remaining energy from the Tree, destroying the fake universe. Toki-Toki returns with the two Vegetas, while Hearts also returns and reports that both Cumber and Broly have disappeared. With Fu defeated, the Supreme Kai of Time uses Toki-Toki's power to repair the damage done to the multiverse. Elsewhere, the cloaked Saiyan reports back to his master, a mysterious alien woman, who claims that her time has come.

=== Ultra God Mission ===
==== Supreme Kai of Time Arc (2022–23) ====
| No. overall | No. in arc | Title | Directed by | Written by | Original release date |
|---|---|---|---|---|---|
| 41 | 1 | "A Plan In Motion – The Mightiest Warriors From Across Space-Time Gather!"; Transliteration: "Ugokidashita Keikaku – Jikū o Koeta Saikyō Senshi Shūketsu!" (Japanese: 動き出した計画 時空を超えた最強戦士集結！) | Yasushi Murayama | Atsuhiro Tomioka | February 23, 2022 |
In the Time Nest, Chronoa (the current Supreme Kai of Time) is confronted by the mysterious alien woman, who is revealed to be Aeos, a former Supreme Kai of Time. On Earth, Goku is visited by a strange being who invites him to participate in the "Super Space-Time Tournament", a grand martial arts tournament involving many other timelines. Goku accepts the invitation and is transported to another realm, where he discovers that Gohan, Piccolo, Vegeta, Hit, Jiren, and Yamcha have also been invited to compete in the tournament as a team. They are introduced to the other teams, and it's revealed that there are twelve teams in total, each with seven members. The tournament announcer explains that the first round of the tournament will last 24 minutes and will be a battle among all twelve teams, where the objective is to either capture one of three Time Fairies, or to defeat all the members of the other teams. As the tournament begins, all seven members of the main timeline's team are transported to different locations on an unknown world. Goku is confronted by Xeno Goku, who reveals that Aeos is hosting the tournament and that the Time Patrol have sent a team to participate because they have business with her. The two Gokus are attacked by a group of fighters from another team, and prepare to deal with them. As many other battles begin across the tournament grounds with 14 minutes remaining in the first round, Aeos observes the proceedings from afar.
| 42 | 2 | "Fierce Battle in the Super Space-Time Tournament! The Warriors in Black Invade!"; Transliteration: "Gekitō no Chō Jikū Tōnamento! Shūrai Suru Kokui no Senshi-tachi!" (Japanese: 激闘の超時空トーナメント！襲来する黒衣の戦士たち！) | Yasushi Murayama | Atsuhiro Tomioka | March 31, 2022 |
With 7 minutes remaining in the first round, many battles continue raging throughout the tournament grounds. After defeating their attackers, the two Gokus begin fighting each other instead, while Yamcha manages to capture one of the three Time Fairies. This automatically qualifies the main timeline's team to move on to the next round, and they are all returned to the starting area, where they are greeted by the teams who managed to capture the two other Time Fairies: the Time Patrol team, and a team that includes Hearts and Cumber. The rest of the participating teams, however, do not return. Several mysterious warriors in black cloaks suddenly appear, and one of them reveals that the losing teams have been erased from existence, along with their entire timelines. The cloaked warrior explains that Aeos is responsible for this, and instructs the remaining teams to prepare for the second round. However, Xeno Trunks is enraged by this revelation and attacks the cloaked warrior, demanding that Aeos return the Scroll of Eternity to the Time Patrol. Xeno Trunks begins fighting the cloaked warrior, while Goku and Piccolo notice that the cloaked warrior seems strangely familiar. Xeno Trunks and the cloaked warrior each fire a powerful ki blast at each other, but Aeos suddenly appears and negates both attacks. Xeno Trunks explains that Aeos is a former Supreme Kai of Time.
| 43 | 3 | "Fierce Battle From Across Time! The Threat of the Warriors in Black!"; Transliteration: "Toki o Koeta Gekitō! Kokui no Senshi-tachi no Kyōi!" (Japanese: 時を超えた激闘！黒衣の戦士たちの脅威！) | Yasushi Murayama | Atsuhiro Tomioka | June 30, 2022 |
Aeos explains that there are now too many timelines, and that she wishes to eliminate most of them to restore balance. She brings in a number of new fighters from other timelines and universes before beginning the next round of the tournament, in which the fighters are scattered across a pocket dimension and confronted by the four cloaked warriors, each of whom possesses another Time Fairy: whoever takes the Fairy from each cloaked warrior will ensure that their team can move on to the next round. The cloaked warriors are revealed to be alternate versions of Piccolo, Future Gohan, and Goku's father Bardock, as well as an alien woman named Vidro, who have all been empowered by Aeos using the Dark Dragon Balls. Gohan and Piccolo are challenged by the alternate Piccolo, while Vegeta, Hit and Yamcha face off against Vidro. Xeno Trunks continues battling the alternate Future Gohan, who reveals that Aeos recruited him from a timeline where Future Bulma and Future Trunks were killed by the androids. Xeno Trunks manages to overpower Future Gohan and tries to reason with him, while Goku and Jiren are confronted by the alternate Bardock, who powers up into an empowered version of Super Saiyan 3.
| 44 | 4 | "Goku vs. the Warrior in Black! The Outcome of Each Battle!"; Transliteration: "Gokū Bāsasu Kokui no Senshi! Sorezore no Tatakai no Yukue!" (Japanese: 悟空VS黒衣の戦士！それぞれの戦いの行方！) | Yasushi Murayama | Atsuhiro Tomioka | September 1, 2022 |
Goku asks Jiren to let him fight Bardock first, and powers up into Ultra Instinct as they begin fighting. Elsewhere, Vegeta, Hit and Yamcha are battling against Vidro, who displays the ability to create clones of herself. Vegeta defeats one of the clones, while Hit overpowers Vidro's main body and prepares to kill her, but Yamcha intervenes in an act of mercy to spare her life. Touched by Yamcha's kindness, Vidro develops a crush on him, while continuing her battle with Hit. Goku and Bardock continue their battle and engage in a beam-clash, which Goku wins. However, Bardock seems to be pleased by this and is proud of how strong Goku has become. Meanwhile, Aeos is confronted by Chronoa, who demands that she return the stolen Time Scrolls.
| 45 | 5 | "Decisive Battle in the Divine Realm! The Power of Time Approaches!"; Transliteration: "Shin Jigen no Kessen! Semarikuru Toki no Chikara!" (Japanese: 神次元の決戦！迫りくる時の力！) | Yasushi Murayama | Atsuhiro Tomioka | October 23, 2022 |
Aeos places the Time Scrolls into an enchanted box, before she and Chronoa both unleash their true forms and begin fighting each other. Chronoa tries to talk Aeos out of her plan by arguing that while the growing number of timelines does present a problem, many of those timelines are all worthy of existence due to their potential. Aeos refuses to change her mind, declaring that there must only be one timeline, and overpowers Chronoa. Goku arrives with the Time Fairy that he obtained from Bardock, and also asks Aeos not to erase the defeated timelines. When Aeos refuses and attacks him, he taps into Ultra Instinct again and begins fighting her. Goku and Aeos prove to be fairly evenly-matched; Aeos surrounds Goku with energy blasts to keep him from dodging and fires a powerful beam attack at him, but he dodges using Instant Transmission and lands a direct hit on her with a Kamehameha. Aeos is shocked that Goku was able to break through her defenses, so she decides that he must be eliminated and begins to power up. Meanwhile, it's revealed that Mechikabura's spirit still exists among the remains of the Universe Tree. He declares that he will have his revenge, but is ambushed and impaled by Demigra, who begins absorbing Mechikabura's Dark Factor for himself.
| 46 | 6 | "The New Dark King Invade! The Terrifying Decisive Battle Begins!"; Transliteration: "Arata Naru Ankokuō Shūrai! Kyōfu no Kessen Kaimaku!" (Japanese: 新たなる暗黒王襲来！恐怖の決戦開幕！) | Yasushi Murayama | Atsuhiro Tomioka | December 17, 2022 |
As Goku and Aeos prepare to continue their battle, they're suddenly interrupted by the arrival of Demigra, who has become the new Dark King by absorbing Mechikabura's Dark Factor. He launches a massive energy blast that destroys Aeos' headquarters, which is seen by all the fighters across the tournament grounds. Goku, Chronoa and Aeos all survive the blast, but Demigra steals the box containing the Time Scrolls and uses it to summon an alternate version of Omega Shenron. Demigra explains his plan to destroy all other gods and create a new age of terror across all of time and space. Goku challenges Demigra, but Omega steps up to fight first. Fortunately, Xeno Gogeta arrives as a Full-Power Super Saiyan 4 just in time to deflect Omega's first attack, and easily overpowers Omega. Omega uses his strongest technique, the Negative Karma Ball, but Xeno Gogeta counters with a Big Bang Kamehameha that repels Omega's blast and destroys him. Aeos agrees to a truce with Goku, Chronoa and the others so they can deal with Demigra. Undeterred, Demigra summons his demon companion Robel, as well as the alternate Broly.
| 47 | 7 | "Dark King Demigra's Evil Hand – A Turbulent Super Space-Time Battle!"; Transliteration: "Ankokuō Domigura no Ma no Te – Gekidō no Chō Jikū Batoru!" (Japanese: 暗黒王ドミグラの魔の手 激動の超時空バトル！) | Yasushi Murayama | Atsuhiro Tomioka | February 12, 2023 |
Demigra changes the entire dimension to resemble Hell and summons several alternate versions of past villains to attack the tournament fighters, empowering the villains with his Dark Factor. Xeno Gogeta and Broly take their fight elsewhere. Despite Broly becoming a Super Saiyan 4, Xeno Gogeta gets the advantage. Demigra savagely strikes Aeos and sends her flying. Angered, Goku powers up to Super Saiyan Blue and fires a Kamehameha, but Demigra uses his Dark Reflector to catch and amplify the attack with Dark Factor before sending it back. To save the still injured Chronoa, Goku counters with another Kamehameha, causing a huge explosion that leaves him injured. Aeos uses her Time Labyrinth to try to freeze Demigra in time, only to be shocked when he is still able to move and shatter the Labyrinth. Demigra says he will show them true despair and powers up.
| 48 | 8 | "A Bond From Across Space-Time! The Fist of Justice that Crushes Evil!"; Transliteration: "Jikū o Koeta Kessoku! Aku o Uchikudaku Seigi no Kobushi!" (Japanese: 時空を超えた結束！悪を打ち砕く正義の拳！) | Unknown | Unknown | April 13, 2023 |
Now in an armored demonic form, Demigra attacks Chronoa. Goku intercepts, but Demigra easily brutalizes him. Yamcha and Vidro combine their powers to defeat Chilled, whom once wiped out Vidro's race. Vidro then asks Yamcha to marry her, shocking him. Cell, Super Android 13, Bojack, and Lord Slug attack Xeno Trunks, but the alternate Future Gohan saves and reconciles with him before they team up against their enemies. Demigra is about to finish off Goku when Vegeta arrives and forces him back. Chronoa telepathically tells Goku, Vegeta, and Aeos a plan. Aeos distracts Demigra by increasing the gravity around him, but he breaks through it. Before he can attack her, Chronoa gives Goku and Vegeta her Potara earrings to allow them to fuse into Vegito. Vegito powers up to Super Saiyan Blue, knocks Demigra away and says he will defeat him.
| 49 | 9 | "The Strongest VS The Deadliest! Unleashing Power Beyond Limits!"; Transliteration: "Saikyō bāsasu Saikyō! Genkai o Koeta Chikara o Tokihanate!" (Japanese: 最強(さいきょう)VS最凶(さいきょう)！限界(げんかい)を超(こ)えた力(ちから)を解(と)き放(はな)て！) | Unknown | Unknown | June 10, 2023 |
Vegito beats up Demigra for a bit, but then defuses back into Goku and Vegeta. Demigra knocks Vegeta out cold, then transforms further and fires an enormous blast at the ground, intending to wipe out everybody. Goku holds the blast back with a Super Saiyan Blue Kamehameha, but starts losing ground. Demigra claims demons are superior because all other races are selfish, but Bardock and alternate Future Gohan arrive and assist Goku with their own blasts. Chronoa and Aeos are amazed to find all of the tournament members, even ones from different timelines, are assisting each other against the villains. Goku uses Ultra Instinct, Bardock uses Super Saiyan 4, and alternate Future Gohan uses Super Saiyan 2. Together, they start pushing Demigra's blast back, shocking him.
| 50 | 10 | "A Light of Hope that Will Not Be Wiped Out! And A Miracle Fight!"; Transliteration: "Zetsubō o Keshi Saru Kibō no Hikari Soshite Kiseki no Kettō e!" (Japanese: 絶望(ぜつぼう)を消(け)し去(さ)る希望(きぼう)の光(ひかり)そして奇跡(きせき)の決闘(けっとう)へ！) | Unknown | Unknown | August 24, 2023 |
As they push Demigra's blast back, Aeos and Chronoa reconcile; though Aeos fears a new evil will take Demigra's place, Chronoa assures her that there is always hope. Demigra is obliterated by the three's combined blast. Aeos and Chronoa use the Time Scrolls to restore the realm to normal and put the summoned villains back. At Goku's suggestion, they resume the tournament, but now as a friendly competition with no stakes involved, amazing Aeos for asking such a humble thing. In the final fight, Goku faces Xeno Goku and they battle using Ultra Instinct and Full-Power Super Saiyan 4 respectively. Aeos tells Chronoa that she will travel to experience the different timelines' potentials. Vidro tells Yamcha that according to the ways of her people, their wedding will take place after she reaches marrying age- in 1200 years. She leaves, dejecting him. Goku knocks Xeno Goku out seconds before passing out, winning the fight. Everyone bids each other goodbye and Bardock expresses pride in his son Goku.

=== Meteor Mission ===
==== Demon Invader Arc (2023–24) ====
| No. overall | No. in arc | Title | Directed by | Written by | Original release date |
|---|---|---|---|---|---|
| 51 | 1 | "The Demon Invader Saga Begins! A Black Shadow Strikes the Earth!"; Transliteration: "Ma no Shinryaku-sha-hen Kaimaku! Chikyū o Osou Kuroi Kage!" (Japanese: 魔(ま)の侵(しん)略(りゃく)者(しゃ)編(へん)開(かい)幕(まく)！地(ち)球(きゅう)を襲(おそ)う黒(くろ)い影(かげ)！) | Unknown | Unknown | October 22, 2023 |
Something crash lands on Earth. Everyone goes home from the Super Space-Time Tournament, but Chronoa, Vegeta, Gohan, Piccolo, and Xeno Trunks wait for Goku to wake up. Chronoa attempts to send them to Earth, but it is gone. Shocked, they go to King Kai's planet, but are greeted by Majin Ozotto, who explains that he ate King Kai and his companions, plus everyone and everything on Earth. Now he aims to eat more gods and attacks Chronoa. The others defend her and fight him with Goku and Vegeta using Super Saiyan Blue, Xeno Trunks using Super Saiyan God, and Gohan using Mystic Form, but he quickly absorbs Piccolo and Gohan. When they damage him, he reveals he gained regeneration from absorbing Buu, plus his detached parts can shapeshift into anyone he absorbed, which he demonstrates with Android 17 and 18. He merges with his duplicates and his power skyrockets. Realizing the battle is hopeless, Chronoa teleports herself, Goku, Vegeta, and Xeno Trunks away.
| 52 | 2 | "The God Hunting Continues! Two Intertwined Battles!"; Transliteration: "Shinkō Suru Kamigari Karamiau Futatsu no Senkyō!" (Japanese: 進(しん)行(こう)する神(かみ)狩(が)リ絡(から)み合(あ)う2つの戦(せん)況(きょう)！) | Unknown | Unknown | December 16, 2023 |
Chronoa explains that Majin Ozotto is a notorious criminal the Time Patrol had been tracking. Ozotto attacks the Elder Kai, having already absorbed Supreme Kai and Kibito, but is interrupted by Xeno Goku and Vegeta. He transforms into Baby and battles them, then has duplicates transform into Frieza and Perfect Cell to battle them. Chronoa's group goes to Namek, but all the Namekians have already been absorbed. They find another Ozotto preparing to consume the planet and challenge him. After Xeno Goku and Vegeta defeat the duplicates, the intrigued Ozottos reveal their desire to absorb everyone to have all their powers and invites both groups to the Ozotto Mansion. They teleport away, leaving invitation cards behind.
| 53 | 3 | "The Battle on Ozotto's Palace! Explode, Saiyan Power!"; Transliteration: "Ozotto no Yakata no Tatakai! Bakuhatsu Sasero! Saiya Pawā!" (Japanese: オゾットの館(やかた)の闘(たたか)い！爆(ばく)発(はつ)させろ！サイヤパワー！) | Unknown | Unknown | February 18, 2024 |
Joined by Xeno Goku and Vegeta, the group goes to the Ozotto Mansion, but makes Chronoa stay behind to not risk her. They blast the mansion, but it is unaffected. Ozotto's voice challenges them to split up and enter 5 different entrances. If they find and defeat the real Ozotto, everyone he ate will be freed. Goku finds and battles an Ozotto duplicate using Ultra Instinct; the duplicate changes to Turles, Bojack, and Meta Cooler and they are evenly matched. Vegeta finds a duplicate who changes to Super Janemba's form. After giving Vegeta a beating, the duplicate says he is too weak to be a meal and would rather eat Goku. Enraged, Vegeta uses Super Saiyan Blue Evolved and blasts him with Final Flash. Meanwhile, Gohan wakes up in a pod and finds Goten, Trunks, and others unconscious in pods. As he struggles to break free, Ozotto taunts him and explains that they are all inside his body.
| 54 | 4 | "Fist of Anger Explosion! Fierce Fight of the Imprisoned!"; Transliteration: "Ikari no Kobushi Sakuretsu! Toraware no Ma no Gekitō!" (Japanese: 恐(いか)りの拳(こぶし)炸(さく)裂(れつ)！囚(とら)われの間(ま)の激(げき)闘(とう)！) | Unknown | Unknown | April 11, 2024 |
Ozotto talks about Gohan's personality as he starts to taunt Gohan by hurting Goten and Trunks, but when he threatens Videl, Gohan explodes with rage, breaks free from his pod, and attacks Ozotto. After defeating their opponents, Xeno Trunks, Xeno Goku, and Xeno Vegeta meet and realize they cannot contact Chronoa. Goku and Vegeta break into the area where Gohan and Ozotto are fighting after killing the other counterparts of Ozotto on purpose, but Ozotto uses the distraction to reabsorb Gohan, and his power skyrockets. With little options, Goku and Vegeta use the Potara to fuse into Vegito. Vegito uses Super Saiyan Blue to start off then Super Saiyan Blue Kaioken and obliterates Ozotto, causing a heavily injured Gohan to reappear, just before he separates. As Goku and Vegeta check on Gohan, he warns them that they are inside Ozotto. As he says this, the entire mansion morphs into a "Giant Fat Form" Ozotto. Meanwhile, Xeno Trunks, Goku, and Vegeta are threatened by several duplicates of past villains.
| 55 | 5 | "Escape from the Ozotto Mansion! Goku's Soul Awakens!"; Transliteration: "Ozotto no Yakatta Kara Dasshutsu Seyo! Gokū, Tamashī no Kakusei!" (Japanese: オゾットの館(やかた)から脱(だっ)出(しゅっ)せよ！悟(ご)空(くう)、魂(たましい)の覚(かく)醒(せい)！) | Unknown | Unknown | June 9, 2024 |
An Ozotto seizes Chronoa. After defeating the villain duplicates, Xeno Trunks, Goku, and Vegeta find Ozotto strangling Chronoa, then sealing her in a pod. He attacks them with tentacles, then an army of duplicates while gloating that he now has power over time, but he still wants more. Goku, Vegeta, and Gohan are attacked by tentacles, but Hearts and Lagss show up to help. They start freeing unconscious people from pods, but have to fight off Ozotto duplicates. Hearts detects Ozotto has a hidden, vulnerable organ and the outer wall. After Hearts clears the way of duplicates, Vegeta uses Super Saiyan Blue Evolved, flies to the wall, and uses Final Explosion to blow a hole in it. An angered Goku flies out of the hole in "Giant Fat Form" Ozotto's stomach with an unconscious Vegeta and prepares to face him with Ultra Instinct. Meanwhile, Aeos becomes aware of what is happening.
| 56 | 6 | "Unleash! An All-Out Attack! A Silver Meteor Streaks Through The Heavens!"; Transliteration: "Hanate! Konshin no Ichigeki! Kakenukeru Hakugin no Meteo" (Japanese: 放(はな)て！渾(こん)身(しん)の一(いち)撃(げき)！かけ抜(ぬ)ける白(はく)銀(ぎん)の流星(メテオ)) | Unknown | Unknown | August 8, 2024 |
Goku uses Ultra Instinct to dodge "Giant Fat Form" Ozotto's attacks and counterattack. Ozotto is eager to gain his powers and summons an army of duplicates. Xeno Goku, Vegeta, and Trunks continue to fight duplicates. One duplicate turns into Chronoa and uses her time powers, but Xeno Goku frees the unconscious Chronoa from her pod, making her duplicate disappear as Ozotto rages against losing his time powers. Hearts and Lagss carry all the unconscious prisoners out of Ozotto's body. Goku uses Ultra Instinct and eliminates the duplicates and uses the Dragon Fist to destroy Ozotto. As Goku sees that Chronoa, Xeno Goku, Vegeta, and Trunks are safe, he passes out from exhaustion. Aeos appears and congratulates Goku. Ozotto's remnants slowly regenerate and try to escape, but Aeos traps him in a jar. She then uses the Super Dragon Balls to restore all the destroyed planets and return everyone home.
