= List of Dragon Ball Super chapters =

First tankōbon volume cover

Dragon Ball Super is a Japanese manga series written by Akira Toriyama and illustrated by Toyotarou. It is a "midquel" to Toriyama's original Dragon Ball and follows Son Goku and his friends as he faces even more powerful foes. After meeting the destructive deity Beerus, and attaining the power of a god, Goku ends up traveling to other universes to protect his own. Dragon Ball Super began serialization in the August 2015 issue of the monthly magazine V Jump, which was released on June 20, 2015. Its publisher Shueisha periodically collects the chapters into tankōbon volumes, with the first released on April 4, 2016, and 24 published as of April 4, 2025. They also publish the series digitally in English and Spanish on their international Manga Plus app and website simultaneously as it is published in Japan. Shueisha began publishing colored versions of the Dragon Ball Super tankōbon digitally on April 3, 2020. Viz Media began posting free English translations of the chapters to their website on June 24, 2016, with a print release of the first volume following on May 2, 2017. They have published 24 volumes in North America as of March 3, 2026.

== Volume list ==
No.	Title	Original release date	English release date
1	Warriors from Universe 6! Dai-Roku Uchū no Senshi-tachi (第6宇宙の戦士たち)	April 4, 2016; 978-4-08-880661-7	May 2, 2017; 978-1-4215-9254-1
1. "God of Destruction's Premonition" (破壊神の予知夢, Hakaishin no Yochimu); 2. "Goku Defeated" (孫悟空の敗北, Son Gokū no Haiboku); 3. "The Rage of Beerus" (ビルスの怒り, Birusu no Ikari); 4. "Battle of Gods" (神と神, Kami to Kami; lit. 'God and God'); 5. "Beerus and Champa" (ビルスとシャンパ, Birusu to Shanpa); 6. "Tournament Preparation" (大会の準備, Taikai no Junbi); 7. "Warriors from Universe 6" (第6宇宙の戦士たち, Dai Roku Uchū no Senshi-tachi); 8. "The Battle Begins!" (試合開始！, Shiai Kaishi!); 9. "Goku vs. Botamo" (悟空VSボタモ, Gokū bui esu Botamo)
Beerus, the God of Destruction, has a dream where he faces a warrior known as "Super Saiyan God" and wishes to find him. Seeking Saiyans out, Beerus is challenged by Goku but defeats him quickly and announces his plan to destroy Earth. Goku has his fellow Saiyans pass him their powers so that he can become the Super Saiyan God; the fight ends undecided and Beerus spares Earth. Beerus' mentor Whis started training Goku and Vegeta, who both surpassed Super Saiyan God by achieving a form known as Super Saiyan Blue. Beerus and his twin brother Champa, the God of Destruction from Universe 6, decide to hold a fighting tournament to determine which universe will take Universe 7's Earth and get to use the Super Dragon Balls, the original planet-size Dragon Balls scattered throughout both Universes from which the Namekian ones were derived, which can grant any wish. Goku is the first to fight from Universe 7, easily defeating Universe 6's Botamo by ring out, after which he begins battling Frost.
2	The Winning Universe Is Decided! Yūshō Uchū, Tsui ni Kettei!! (優勝宇宙、ついに決定！！)	December 2, 2016; 978-4-08-880867-3	December 5, 2017; 978-1-4215-9647-1
10. "Frost's True Form" (フロストの正体, Furosuto no Shōtai); 11. "Vegeta's Turn!!" (ベジータ登場！！, Bejīta Tōjō!!); 12. "Saiyan's Pride" (サイヤ人の誇り, Saiya-jin no Hokori); 13. "The Winning Universe Is Decided!" (優勝宇宙、ついに決定！！, Yūshō Uchū, Tsui ni Kettei!!); 14. "SOS from the Future" (未来からのSOS, Mirai Kara no Esu Ō Esu); 15. "Hope!! Once Again" (HOPE!!再び, Hōpu!! Futabi)
Frost defeats Goku by ring out and then defeats Piccolo in the same exact way. However, it is learned that Frost cheated by using a hidden poisoned needle, thus allowing Piccolo and Goku back into the competition, however Piccolo declines reentry and Goku is placed after Vegeta, who declines to accept Frost's disqualification. Vegeta then quickly defeats Frost by ring out. Vegeta struggles against the impervious Otta Magetta, but succeeds when he insults him, resulting in the mentally delicate metal man becoming depressed and unable to fight. During his fight against Cabbe, Vegeta taunts and insults the young Saiyan in order to help him achieve Super Saiyan, before quickly knocking him out. Unable to land even a single blow, Vegeta is then defeated by Hit. Although able to keep up with Hit, Goku acknowledges Hit is limited by the rule of not being able to kill and steps out of bounds in order to see Monaka fight. However, Hit realizes Monaka is not actually a fighter and throws their match. As winner, Beerus uses the Super Dragon Balls to restore the humans on Universe 6's Earth. Zenō-sama, the Lord of Everything who rules over all 12 Universes, shows up and says he will organize a similar tournament among all the universes. Trunks, who previously traveled back in time from the future, returns having fled from someone he calls Goku Black, a Goku doppelgänger in his timeline who wants to annihilate all mortals on Earth in the name of justice and has already done so to several other planets.
3	Zero Mortal Project! Ningen Zero Keikaku (人間ゼロ計画)	June 2, 2017; 978-4-08-881084-3	July 3, 2018; 978-1-4215-9946-5
16. "Future Trunks' Past" ("未来"トランクスの過去, "Mirai" Torankusu no Kako); 17. "Zamas: The Next Lord of Lords from Universe 10" (次期第10宇宙界王神候補ザマス, Jiki Dai-Jū Uchū Kaiōshin Kōho Zamasu); 18. "Goku Black's True Identity" (ゴクウブラックの正体, Gokū Burakku no Shōtai); 19. "Another Zamas" (もう一人のザマス, Mō Hitori no Zamasu); 20. "The Zero Mortal Project" (人間ゼロ計画, Ningen Zero Keikaku)
Just before the appearance of Goku Black, Trunks trained under the Kaiō-shin in order to defeat Bobbidi in his timeline. He succeeded in stopping the resurrection of Majin Boo with his Super Saiyan 2 form, but Kaiō-shin died, causing the death of Beerus too. Beerus and Whis deduce that Goku Black must be an upper-level god himself to know that the Lord of Lords' life is connected to that of the God of Destruction's. Meanwhile, Zenō-sama summons Goku to his palace to be his friend and gives him a button to press to summon him. In an investigation to prevent this from happening in their own timeline, Beerus and Whis identify Zamas, Northern Lord of Worlds in Universe 10 and apprentice Lord of Lords under Gowas who feels wiping out unworthy mortals is appropriate for Lords of Lords, as the culprit and destroy him. Goku Black/Zamas killed Gowas, used the Super Dragon Balls to switch bodies with Goku and killed him, traveled in time to Trunks' timeline, and killed the remaining Lords of Lords which in turn killed the Gods of Destruction. Meanwhile, Vegeta is about to defeat Goku Black when the Zamas of Trunks' timeline appears and heals him, increasing his strength as Saiyans do and reaching a new level he dubs Super Saiyan Rosé. It is revealed that Zamas used the Dragon Balls to make himself immortal. Trunks distracts Goku Black and Zamas so Goku and Vegeta can flee back to their timeline.
4	Last Chance for Hope; Hōpu e no Rasuto Chansu (HOPEへのラストチャンス)	November 2, 2017; 978-4-08-881163-5	January 1, 2019; 978-1-9747-0144-5
21. "Last Chance for Hope" (HOPEへのラストチャンス, Hōpu e no Rasuto Chansu); 22. "Zamas's Final Trump Card" (ザマスの最終手段, Zamasu no Saishū Shudan); 23. "The Potara's True Worth" (ポタラの真価, Potara no Shinka); 24. "Son Goku's Evolution" (孫悟空の進化, Son Gokū no Shinka)
Goku goes to Kame-Sennin to learn the Mafū-ba technique, while Vegeta trains in the Room of Spirit and Time. Kaiō-shin and Gowas travel to Trunks' timeline where Gowas is seriously wounded while trying to talk Goku Black out of his plan. Having returned, Vegeta fights Goku Black in Super Saiyan God form while briefly switching to Super Saiyan Blue when he attacks. Goku tries to lock Zamas away using the Mafū-ba, but forgot the talisman to seal it. Losing the battle, Goku Black and Zamas use their Potara earrings to fuse into one body they call "God Zamas". Having learned that Potara fusion only lasts one hour when the users are not Lord of Lords, Goku and Vegeta use it to form Vegerot. Although they are winning in Super Saiyan Blue form, Goku and Vegeta separate early as the fusion was unstable either due to their massive power or because they are mortal. Having realized that he possesses healing powers from apprenticing under a Lord of Lords, Trunks heals Goku's injuries. Having now perfected Super Saiyan Blue, Goku is able to stand up to God Zamas although it is damaging his body.
5	The Decisive Battle! Farewell, Trunks! Kessen! Saraba Torankusu (決戦！さらばトランクス)	March 2, 2018; 978-4-08-881447-6	May 7, 2019; 978-1-9747-0458-3
25. "Will It Be Goku?! Or Zamas?!" (悟空か！？ザマスか！？, Gokū Ka!? Zamasu Ka!?); 26. "The Decisive Battle! Farewell, Trunks!" (決戦！さらばトランクス, Kessen! Saraba Torankusu); 27. "Life, Training and More" (修行と日常そして..., Shugyō to Nichijō Soshite...); 28. "The Gods of Destruction from All 12 Universes" (12宇宙の破壊神, Jū Ni Uchū no Hakaishin)
Deciding to use everything he has left in one final attack, Goku begins using Beerus' Destruction technique to destroy God Zamas' body once and for all but stops when Mai is used as a shield. When their Portara fusion starts separating due to the hour time limit, Trunks cuts them in two with his sword and seemingly finishes off Goku Black. But during the fusion their cells joined, meaning the immortal God Zamas was simply split into two. When Vegeta fires an attack blowing them to pieces, they split into even more copies. Realizing the futility, everyone plans to flee to the main timeline while Goku and Vegeta buy as much time as possible against an army of God Zamas. However, Goku remembers the button Zenō-sama gave him and presses it summoning the Zenō-sama of Trunks' timeline, who then destroys the universe and God Zamas, while everyone else flees to the main timeline. Goku travels back one more time to get that Zenō-sama and bring him to the Zenō-sama of the main timeline, while Trunks and Mai later travel back to their timeline but before the Lord of Lords died so they can warn Beerus about Zamas. Beerus ignores Goku when asked about the interuniverse tournament that Zenō-sama talked about, so he goes to the two Zenō-samas to remind them. The Zenō-samas plan to hold it in 40 hours and summon the Gods of Destruction from all 12 universes, their Angels, and the Lords of Lords to tell them about the Tournament of Power. Because future Zenō-sama has never seen one before, it is decided that a Zen Exhibition Match will be held as a battle royale amongst all the Gods of Destruction. Realizing this is all Goku's fault, the Gods of Destruction all decide to gang up on Beerus, who dodges them all, until Belmod attacks Sidra and reminds them it is every man for themselves.
6	The Super Warriors Gather! Atsumare Chō Senshi-Tachi！ (集まれ超戦士たち！)	June 4, 2018; 978-4-08-881501-5	September 3, 2019; 978-1-9747-0520-7
29. "Toppo, Universe 11 God of Destruction Candidate! (第11宇宙破壊神候補トッポ, Dai Jū Ichi Uchū Hakaishin Kōho Toppo); 30. "The Man Named Jiren (ジレンという男, Jiren to Iu Otoko); 31. "The Super Warriors Gather!" (集まれ超戦士たち！, Atsumare Chō Senshi-Tachi); 32. "The Super Warriors Gather! Part 2" (集まれ超戦士たち！2, Atsumare Chō Senshi-Tachi! Tsū)
Because the Gods of Destruction's fighting is too intense for the Zenō-samas to enjoy, the exhibition match is cancelled. However, a new one between mortals Goku and Toppo, Belmod's apprentice to succeed him as God of Destruction, is held instead. Goku loses and Toppo informs him that a mortal named Jiren is the strongest in Universe 11, stronger than even Belmod. The rules for the Tournament of Power between universes are explained; each universe will select 10 fighters to compete in a 48 minute battle royale, no weapons or medicines allowed, and no killing. Thus, eliminating opponents by knocking them out of the ring is the goal. The team with the most fighters remaining at the end will win a wish with the Super Dragon Balls, while the losing universes will be erased by the Zenō-samas. Although Universes 1, 12, 5 and 8 are exempt from participating and erasure due to their high average "mortal levels." The eight competing universes have 39 hours to form their teams. In Universe 11, Toppo recruits his fellow Pride Troopers, including Dyspo and Jiren. In Universe 6, Cabbe recruits two female Saiyans, Caulifla and Kale. In Universe 7, Vegeta, Piccolo, Kame-Sennin, Kuririn, Android 18, Gohan and Tenshinhan are recruited easily enough. Goku then seeks out and recruits Android 17, who has become a wildlife conservationist on a wildlife sanctuary. In order to complete their roster, they are forced to have Baba Uranai revive the dead Freeza for 24 hours, promising to fully resurrect him if they win.
7	Universe Survival! The Tournament of Power Begins!! Uchū Sabaibaru! Chikara no Taikai Kaishi! (宇宙サバイバル！力の大会開始！)	September 4, 2018; 978-4-08-881575-6	December 3, 2019; 978-1-9747-0777-5
33. "Universe Survival! The Tournament of Power Begins!!" (宇宙サバイバル！力の大会開始！, Uchū Sabaibaru! Chikara no Taikai Kaishi!); 34. "The First Doomed Universe" (最初の消滅宇宙, Saisho no Shōmetsu Uchū); 35. "Hit vs. Jiren" (ヒットVSジレン！, Hitto bui esu Jiren!); 36. "Quirky Competitors" (個性的な選手たち, Kosei-tekina Senshu-tachi)
The Tournament of Power begins in the World of Void, where the fighters are unable to fly by using chi, with Universe 7 quickly knocking out six opponents. Freeza forms an alliance with Frost, directing him to take out his own teammates Kuririn and Tenshinhan and then to go all out on others. Tired after knocking out seven more people, Frost is then betrayed by Freeza and eliminated. Freeza also eliminates the Trio de Dangers, making Universe 9 the first to lose and the first erased from existence. Trying to fight Jiren, Goku is held back by the other Pride Troopers until he sees Jiren knock down Hit and charges at him in Super Saiyan Blue. However, neither man is able to land a strike until Hit stops Jiren from knocking Goku out, settling a debt from their last fight. Hit proposes the two team up while he uses his new technique on Jiren, but Goku declines wanting to beat Jiren alone and alludes to wanting to first achieve a new transformation. Hit's new technique slows Jiren down, allowing him to push him to the edge of the ring, but Jiren was only acting and easily knocks Hit out of contention. Android 18 has trouble with Ribrianne and her two subordinates, until she gets distracted by 18's handsome husband Kuririn. But as 18 is about to eliminate them, all four plus two more contestants are knocked out by an invisible fighter from Universe 4, who is then stopped by Piccolo. However, Piccolo is then eliminated by another fighter from the same Universe that no one can spot. This causes everyone to be on guard, until Android 17 uses his hearing to learn that the opponent was not invisible but insect-size and eliminates him. 37 fighters are left, with 33 minutes remaining in the tournament.
8	Sign of Son Goku's Awakening; Son Gokū Kakusei no "Kizashi" (孫悟空覚醒の"兆")	December 4, 2018; 978-4-08-881649-4	March 3, 2020; 978-1-9747-0941-0
37. "Awaken, Super Saiyan Kale" (覚醒·超サイヤ人ケール, Kakusei · Supa Saiya-jin Kēru); 38. "Universe 6's Last Resort" (第6宇宙の最終手段, Dai Roku Uchū no Saishū Shudan); 39. "Sign of Son Goku's Awakening" (孫悟空覚醒の"兆", Son Gokū Kakusei no "Kizashi"); 40. "Jiren vs. Universe 7" (ジレンVS第7宇宙, Jiren bui esu Dai Nana Uchū)
With Caulifla about to be eliminated by Freeza, the shy Kale comes to her aid and transforms into a form of Super Saiyan never seen before. Suspected by her fellow Universe 6 Saiyans of being the Legendary Saiyan, who appears every 1,000 years with power that keeps growing until they essentially self-destruct, Kale loses her senses and goes on a rampage, which results in four more universes losing and being erased from existence. The teamwork of Universe 11 eventually knocks Kale flying out of the ring, but Cabbe sacrifices himself and throws her back in so that her and Caulifla could fuse together using the Potara earrings that the latter stole off of their Lord of Lords before the tournament began. Although the earrings are against the rules, the childlike Zenō-samas are too excited about the result to care. Fused with Kale's brute power and Caulifla's battle sense, Kefla eliminates six members of Universe 11 before fighting to a dual ringout with Gohan, resulting in Universe 6's erasure. Leaving only Universes 7 and 11 left. With Goku still unable to phase Jiren, Kame-Sennin gives him one last lesson when he dodges Jiren's attacks himself until the old martial arts master is eliminated. This allows Goku to reach Ultra Instinct, the ultimate technique that allows one to dodge attacks subconsciously, although it only lasts a moment. However, seeing Goku once again surpass him, Vegeta levels up achieving his own new form, but it is not enough to beat Jiren. Meanwhile, Freeza tricks Toppo and Dyspo, and when Jiren declines to help them, they are eliminated, leaving only Jiren left for Universe 11. In order to take out Jiren, Android 17 self-destructs, but while it has no effect on his opponent, Goku achieves Ultra Instinct again.
9	Battle's End and Aftermath; Ketchaku to Ketsumatsu (決着と結末)	April 4, 2019; 978-4-08-881811-5	June 2, 2020; 978-1-9747-1236-6
41. "Ultra Instinct" (身勝手の極意, Migatte no Gokui); 42. "Battle's End and Aftermath" (決着と結末, Ketchaku to Ketsumatsu); 43. "Joining the Galactic Patrol!" (銀河パトロール入隊!, Ginga Patorōru Nyūtai!); 44. "Escaped Prisoner Moro" (脱獄囚モロ, Datsugoku Shū Moro)
Having achieved True Ultra Instinct, Goku's hair turns silver and he seems to have the upper hand over Jiren. However, with no practice, Goku can not maintain the form and teams up with Vegeta to take Jiren on together. Vegeta is eliminated, and when it seems Goku is about to be as well, Freeza reappears and sacrifices himself with Goku to knock Jiren out of the ring. It is revealed that Android 17 faked self-destruction and hid, making him and Universe 7 the winners. Universe 11 is erased, but Android 17 uses his reward, a wish with the Super Dragon Balls, to have all of the erased Universes restored. Whis fully resurrects Freeza as per their agreement, and he returns to his own planet. Some time later, Goku and Vegeta try to stop Majin Boo from being kidnapped by a mysterious group, but are knocked out and abducted into space as well. The group turns out to be members of the Galactic Patrol, including Jaco, led by their number one agent, Merus. Merus reveals that Moro, a magical being who destroyed innumerous planets by absorbing their life energy, has escaped from Galactic Prison. 10 million years earlier, the Great Lord of Lords used up most of his god power to seal away Moro's magic. Although he was sentenced to death, no one was able to kill Moro, so he was given life in prison. The Galactic Patrol have sought out Majin Boo, as he absorbed the Great Lord of Lords 5 million years after Moro's arrest, hoping to extract the ability to seal Moro's magic again. With Boo asleep, Goku and Vegeta are inducted as temporary Galactic Patrol members and learn that Moro is on his way to the new planet Namek. Moro arrives on Namek seeking the Dragon Balls, which he learned of from his fellow prison escapee Cranberry, a deserter of Freeza's army, but Goku and Vegeta arrive at the same time using the former's teleportation. Vegeta attacks Moro, curious about his magical abilities.
10	Moro's Wish; Moro no Negai (モロの願い)	August 2, 2019; 978-4-08-882034-7	September 1, 2020; 978-1-9747-1526-8
45. "Moro's Magic" (モロの魔法, Moro no Mahō); 46. "Namek in Decline" (衰耗するナメック星, Suikō-suru Namekku-sei); 47. "Stolen Dragon Balls" (奪われたドラゴンボール, Ubawareta Doragon Bōru); 48. "Moro's Wish" (モロの願い, Moro no Negai)
Moro fights Vegeta by harnessing the power of planet Namek in his attacks. When he collects and consumes some of the energy of the planet and its lifeforms for himself, it is revealed that he has also been absorbing Vegeta and Goku's energy. Now unable to stand against Moro, the two Saiyans are defeated and left for dead. But they are partially healed by the young Namekian Esca and rest for the next three days, during which time Moro and Cranberry gather the Dragon Balls. The Galactic Patrol arrive just as Moro is about to clash with the still weak Goku and Vegeta for the last Dragon Ball. They have brought the now awake Majin Boo, within whom they awakened memories as the Great Lord of Lords, which had the added effect of unlocking his latent power. Seemingly impervious to Moro's magic, Majin Boo subdues the criminal and is about to seal his powers again. However, Cranberry summons Porunga with the Dragon Balls and makes two wishes, to have himself healed and to have Moro regain his full power, before being killed by Moro. Moro makes the third and final wish before fleeing. Boo heals Goku and Vegeta before the Great Lord of Lords takes over his body and the three pursue Moro.
11	Great Escape; Dai Dassō Dai Dassō (大だい脱走だっそう)	December 4, 2019; 978-4-08-882154-2	December 1, 2020; 978-1-9747-1761-3
49. "Outer Space Battle" (宇宙空間バトル, Uchū Kūkan Batoru); 50. "Great Escape" (大脱走, Dai Dassō); 51. "To Each Their Own Plans" (それぞれの行動, Sorezore no Kōdō); 52. "Goku and Vegeta's Training" (悟空とベジータの修業, Gokū to Bejīta no Shugyō)
Majin Boo and Moro fight again, with Moro realizing that Boo can not seal his magic because it was the evil side of Boo, previously killed by Goku, that received the Great Lord of Lords' god power. The third wish on the Dragon Balls is revealed to have been Moro wishing for all the prisoners in Galactic Prison to be freed. Led by the bandit Saganbo and strengthened by Moro's magic, the small army of convicts, dubbed the Galactic Bandit Brigade, break out and attack Goku and Vegeta on Namek. With Moro absorbing their energy again, Goku and Vegeta realize their standard tactics will not work against him and retreat with the Galactic Patrol. After consuming Namek, Moro and his army travel from planet to planet seeking out other suitable ones for him to consume as he gets even stronger. Vegeta travels to the planet Yardrat to learn its natives' unconventional techniques, while Goku enters a Room of Spirit and Time with Merus to train in hopes of mastering Ultra Instinct. Needing more Galactic Patrol members, the Galactic King tasks Jaco with recruiting more of Earth's residents into service.
12	Merus's True Identity; Merusu no Shōtai (メルスの正体)	April 3, 2020; 978-4-08-882264-8	March 2, 2021; 978-1-9747-2001-9
53. "Saganbo's Galactic Bandit Brigade" (サガンボ銀河強盗団, Saganbo Ginga Gōtō-dan); 54. "Gohan vs. Seven-Three" (孫梧飯VSセブンスリー, Son Gohan bui esu Sebunsurī); 55. "Merus's True Identity" (メルスの正体, Merusu no Shōtai); 56. "Warriors of Earth Assemble" (地球戦士集結, Chikyū Senshi Shūketsu)
Saganbo's henchmen Shimorekka, Seven-Three, and Yunba attack Earth, battling Piccolo, Kuririn, and Jaco. When Gohan arrives, Seven-Three is forced to use Moro's abilities that he copied. Just as Seven-Three is about to kill them, Moro orders him and his comrades to leave the planet after hearing that Goku and Vegeta are training to beat him, so that he can personally consume the two Saiyans' high-level energy in two months' time. On Yardrat, Vegeta easily defeats Moro's minion Yuzun with his already increased power. After the two months are up, Whis ends Goku's training by taking Merus, who is revealed to be an Angel in training, back to their realm. With Goku and Vegeta not back yet, Moro and the Galactic Bandit Brigade attack and engage Piccolo, Kuririn, Gohan, Kame-Sennin, Tenshinhan, Chaozu, and Yamcha, backed by Jaco and the Galactic Patrol, in battle across the Earth. Working together, Gohan and Piccolo combat Seven-Three, once again forcing him to switch to using Moro's abilities, at which point Androids 17 and 18 step in since they do not have chi for him to absorb.
13	Battles Abound; Sorezore no Tatakai (それぞれの戦い)	August 4, 2020; 978-4-08-882391-1	June 1, 2021; 978-1-9747-2281-5
57. "Battles Abound" (それぞれの闘い, Sorezore no Tatakai); 58. "Son Goku Arrives" (孫悟空到着, Son Gokū Tōchaku); 59. "Activate Ultra Instinct -Sign-" (話 発動！身勝手の極意"兆", Hatsudō! Migatte no Gokui "Chō"); 60. "Merus's Miscalculation" (メルスの誤算, Merusu no Gosan)
Hoping to redeem the Galactic Bandit Brigade, Saganbo goes on a rampage with a power boost from Moro. When Goku arrives, Saganbo continues to fight him with further power boosts from Moro, until his body can no longer handle it. Moro finally enters battle against Goku, who uses his new technique of the gods. Although he moves at such a high speed that he can avoid Moro's energy absorption, Goku has not mastered Ultra Instinct and is only able to reach its entry level, -Sign-. This unstable level demands high stamina, something Moro plans to take advantage of by dragging the fight out, until Goku decides to charge in at full power after sensing Moro is stronger than he anticipated. When Goku can no longer hold the Ultra Instinct -Sign- form, Vegeta arrives on Earth having finally mastered the new technique he desired.
14	Son Goku, Galactic Patrol Officer; Ginga Patorōru Son Gokū (銀河パトロール孫悟空)	December 4, 2020; 978-4-08-882518-2	September 7, 2021; 978-1-9747-2463-5
61. "Vegeta Reborn" (新生ベジータ, Shinsei Bejīta); 62. "Edge of Defeat" (絶体絶命, Zettai Zetsumei); 63. "Merus's Resolve" (メルスの覚悟, Merusu no Kakugo); 64. "Son Goku, Galactic Patrol Officer" (銀河パトロール孫悟空, Ginga Patorōru Son Gokū)
Using Forced Spirit Fission, Vegeta liberates the souls and life energy that Moro has consumed. This not only weakens Moro, but also brings back to life those with "potent life force" that he had killed by absorption; namely the Namekians. Moro then consumes Seven-Three, who had a copy of Moro in storage, making him stronger than ever. He has also obtained Seven-Three's copy ability and promptly uses it on Vegeta. Vegeta, Goku, and their friends are now unable to challenge Moro, who mortally wounds Goku and Piccolo. Beerus and Whis travel to Earth and mildly intervene in mortal affairs by helping Dende heal everyone and allowing Merus to combat Moro. Merus seals Moro's copy ability by destroying the crystals on his body, but by doing so using his Angel powers, he violated Angel law and ceases to exist. His sacrifice pushes Goku to finally perfect Ultra Instinct, leaving Moro no match for him.
15	Moro, Consumer of Worlds; Hoshi-kui no Moro (星ほし喰くいのモロ)	April 2, 2021; 978-4-08-882606-6	January 4, 2022; 978-1-9747-2517-5
65. "Son Goku, Earthling" (地球人 孫悟空, Chikyūjin Son Gokū); 66. "Moro, Consumer of Worlds" (星喰いのモロ, Hoshikui no Moro); 67. "Happy Endings...And Then..." (大団円そして..., Daidan'en Soshite...); 68. "Granolah the Survivor" (生残者グラノラ, Seizansha Guranora)
After Moro promises to surrender to Galactic Prison, Goku gives him a Senzu bean which restores his stamina. Although he quickly goes back on his word and attacks, Moro still can not harm Goku. While despairing his inferior power, Moro notices and reattaches a severed hand of his that had copied Merus before his copy power was sealed. However, his body is unable to contain the Angel power and swells until he fuses into the Earth and makes it his body. Not only does this mean killing Moro would also destroy the Earth, but his energy will continue to swell until it becomes too much and the resulting explosion could destroy the galaxy. Before he and Beerus leave, Whis informs Goku that the only way to defeat Moro is to destroy the crystal on his forehead, like Merus had done previously. When Goku gets caught by Moro, Vegeta uses his Forced Spirit Fission in reverse and gives the energy of their friends and the god power of Uub to Goku, allowing him to break free and defeat Moro. Days later, the Namekian Dragon Balls are used to restore the planets Moro destroyed and bring back to life those he killed and it is revealed that Merus was allowed to be resurrected into a mortal. Sometime later, the remnants of Seven-Three are salvaged from the crater created when Moro was defeated before being stolen by bounty hunter Granolah, a Cerealian who hates Freeza and the Saiyans for massacring his people. While selling Seven-Three to The Heeters, a sibling-run organization that deals in bounties and assassinations, Granolah learns that Freeza has been resurrected and sets out for revenge.
16	The Universe's Greatest Warrior; Uchūichi no Senshi (宇宙一の戦士)	August 4, 2021; 978-4-08-882744-5	August 2, 2022; 978-1-9747-3211-1
69. "The Evolution of Planet Cereal" (シリアル星の遷移, Shiriaru-sei no Sen'i); 70. "The Universe's Greatest Warrior" (宇宙一の戦士, Uchūichi no Senshi); 71. "The Heeters' Plan" (ヒータの計画, Hīta no Keikaku); 72. "Saiyans and Cerealian" (サイヤ人とシリアル人, Saiya-jin to Shiriaru-jin)
The Heeters learn of the Dragon Balls through Seven-Three and recall that a single Namekian lives with Granolah on planet Cereal, Monaito. Granolah ignores Monaito's warning and uses both Cerealian Dragon Balls to become the strongest lifeform in the universe, under the condition of shortening his remaining 150 years of life down to three years, and asks The Heeters to find him Freeza's location. Not wanting Freeza's army to be destroyed as they want to take it over, The Heeters scheme to put Granolah against Goku and Vegeta. Macki and Oil travel to Earth to steal a Dragon Radar, which detects Dragon Balls, and lure the two Saiyans to Cereal by claiming Granolah is terrorizing the planet. They also tell Granolah that Goku and Vegeta are Freeza's Saiyan assassins on the way to kill him. Goku and Vegeta, the latter of whom has trained under Beerus and learned the destruction technique of the Gods of Destruction, engage Granolah in battle, but the Cerealian's evolved right eye allows him to see their weaknesses and attack their vital points.
17	God of Destruction Power; Hakaishin no Chikara (破壊神の力)	December 3, 2021; 978-4-08-882858-9	December 6, 2022; 978-1-9747-3451-1
73. "Goku vs. Granolah" (悟空VSグラノラ, Gokū bui esu Guranora); 74. "Vegeta vs. Granolah" (ベジータVSグラノラ, Bejīta bui esu Guranora); 75. "God of Destruction Power" (破壊神の力, Hakaishin no Chikara); 76. "The Fate of the Saiyans" (サイヤ人の宿命, Saiya-jin no Shukumei)
By using Perfected Ultra Instinct, Goku forces the Cerealian to reveal that the Granolah they have been fighting is a weaker clone/illusion that he created of himself. When fighting the real Granolah, Vegeta is able to achieve a new form he learned from Beerus dubbed Ultra Ego, which feeds off of his ego and Saiyan love of battle. Goku and Vegeta realize they have been tricked by Macki and Oil, but Granolah ignores the words of his partner Oatmeel and continues seeking revenge on the Saiyans. During their fight, Granolah also levels up when his left eye achieves the same evolved form as his right. Just as Granolah is about to sacrifice himself to kill Vegeta, Monaito arrives, having been led to the battlefield by Oatmeel, and tells Granolah that the person who actually saved them from the Saiyans' massacre 40 years ago was a Saiyan named Bardock.
18	Bardock, Father of Goku; Gokū no Chichi Bādakku (悟空の父バーダック)	April 4, 2022; 978-4-08-883092-6	June 6, 2023; 978-1-9747-3652-2
77. "Bardock, Father of Goku" (悟空の父バーダック, Gokū no Chichi Bādakku); 78. "Gas's Wish" (ガスの願い, Gasu no Negai); 79. "Gas vs. Granolah" (ガスVSグラノラ, Gasu bui esu Guranora); 80. "Gas vs. Granolah, Part 2" (ガスVSグラノラ2, Gasu bui esu Guranora Tsū)
Granolah learns that Bardock showed mercy on Monaito, Granolah and his mother 40 years ago, only for Elec of The Heeters to kill his mother. Meanwhile, Elec uses the Cerealian Dragon Balls to make his younger brother Gas the new strongest lifeform in the universe. Now that Granolah is no longer useful to The Heeters, Gas attacks him, Goku and Vegeta. Once Granolah eats the last Senzu bean that Vegeta brought, he seems to have the upper hand against Gas, who initially refuses to use his new powers and then seems to be at a disadvantage due to his lack of experience with them when he finally does. However, at Elec's direction, Gas transforms by "unleashing his instincts" and goes on a mindless rampage. After seeing Goku, who is the spitting image of his father Bardock, whom Gas fought 40 years ago, Gas comes to his senses in his new form.
19	A People's Pride; Minzoku no Hokori (民族の誇り)	August 4, 2022; 978-4-08-883215-9	September 5, 2023; 978-1-9747-3910-3
81. "Goku's Conflict" (悟空の葛藤, Gokū no Kattō); 82. "Bardock vs. Gas" (バダックVSガス, Bādakku bui esu Gasu); 83. "Bardock vs. Gas, Part 2" (バダックVSガス2, Bādakku bui esu Gasu Tsū); 84. "A People's Pride" (民族の誇り, Minzoku no Hokori)
After Elec shoots Granolah, Goku combats Gas and leads him on a chase across multiple locales and planets in order to buy time for Monaito to heal Granolah. Stranding Gas on a distant planet, Goku returns to planet Cereal where Monaito presents him and Vegeta with a Scouter that Bardock left behind that contains an audio recording of his actions 40 years ago. In a flashback depicting the fight between Bardock and Gas, it is revealed that the Cerealian Dragon Balls were used by Monaito to wish that Bardock's sons "thrive"; thus being why Goku and Raditz survived Freeza's extinction of the Saiyans. Hearing how Bardock thought of nothing but victory during the battle, Goku and Vegeta both realize what "Saiyan Pride" is. As the two fight Gas together, Gas begins to realize that the two are getting stronger.
20	All-Out Bout; Zenryokusen (全ぜん力りょく戦せん)	March 3, 2023; 978-4-08-883470-2	February 6, 2024; 978-1-9747-4360-5
85. "To Each His Own Answer" (それぞれの答え, Sorezore no Kotae); 86. "All-Out Bout" (全力戦, Zenryokusen); 87. "The Universe's Strongest Appears" (宇宙一の戦士 発現, Uchūichi no Senshi Hatsugen); 88. "Super Heroes Are Born" (スーパーヒーロー誕生, Sūpā Hīrō Tanjō)
Vegeta continues to fight Gas until Ultra Ego drains all his energy, at which point Goku takes over. When Gas achieves another slight breakthrough, the two Saiyans combat the Heeter in order to buy Granolah time to charge up an attack to finish him. Although he lands the attack, which shortened his life even more, Granolah intentionally does not kill Gas. Now showing no regard for his own body, Gas seriously wounds Monaito and begins fighting Goku and Vegeta. However, Freeza appears and quickly kills Gas and Elec. He briefly unveils a new form he calls Black Freeza, achieved by training in a Room of Spirit and Time for the equivalent of 10 years, before departing with Macki and Oil as servants. Whis arrives to heal Monaito and take Goku and Vegeta back to Beerus' planet to train in order to catch up to Freeza, who is now stronger than them. On Earth, Trunks and Goten have begun fighting crime as superheroes Saiyaman X-1 and X-2, respectively. While investigating the criminal case of someone tampering with Capsule Corp. robots, the duo defeat a group of reanimated corpses and recover a data disk with the name "Dr. Gero" written on it.
21	Vs. Dr. Hedo; Taiketsu Dr. Hedo (対決Dr.ヘド)	August 4, 2023; 978-4-08-883601-0	May 14, 2024; 978-1-9747-4686-6
89. "A Rival Appears!" (ライバル出現!, Raibaru Shutsugen!); 90. "Vs. Dr. Hedo" (対決Dr.ヘド, Taiketsu Dr. Hedo); 91. "The Red Ribbon Army's Revival" (復活レッドリボン軍, Fukkatsu Reddo Ribon Gun); 92. "New Androids" (新たなる人造人間, Aratanaru Jinzōningen)
Mai begins attending high school with Trunks and Goten, while Dr. Hedo repeatedly sends his Beta Androids to pursue Trunks and Goten after he learns they are the ones who stole his data disk. Mai uses their school dance's booking of Hedo's favorite superhero, Cleangod, to lure the doctor out, but he escapes while reclaiming the disk. Kuririn reveals that Dr. Hedo is the grandson of Dr. Gero and that the police want to prevent a reformed Red Ribbon Army from contacting Hedo due to his and his grandfather's knowledge and data on bio-organic weapons. After having destroyed the disk due to already memorizing its contents, Dr. Hedo is eventually arrested for stealing corpses. When he is released three months later, Magenta and Carmine of the Red Ribbon Army recruit him to build Androids for their world domination plans, while also convincing him that Goku and his friends are evil alien invaders being led by Bulma. Six months later, Piccolo has begun training Pan as Gohan has become too absorbed in his research and has seemingly stopped training. When Piccolo is attacked by one of Dr. Hedo's new superhero-themed Androids, Gamma #2, he follows him back to the Red Ribbon Army's secret base. There, he learns that the Red Ribbon Army have Hedo working on an Android known as "Cell Max", but the doctor is hesitant to awaken it as the program to control him is not finished. Piccolo attempts to have Bulma contact Goku and Vegeta for help, but they are off training with Broly under Beerus and Whis.
22	The Ultimate Teacher and Pupil; Saikyō no Shitei (最強の師弟)	December 4, 2023; 978-4-08-883744-4	December 3, 2024; 978-1-9747-4985-0
93. "Operation: Kidnap Pan" (パン誘拐作戦, Pan Yūkai Sakusen); 94. "Get Your Head in the Game, Son Gohan!" (目覚めよ! 孫悟飯, Mezameyo! Son Gohan); 95. "The Ultimate Teacher and Pupil" (最強の師弟, Saikyō no Shitei); 96. "Saiyamen, on the Scene!" (サイヤマン参戦！, Saiyaman Sansen!)
After Beerus decides to allow Broly, Cheelai, whom he has a crush on, and Lemo, whose cooking he enjoys, hide from Freeza on his planet, Goku and Vegeta have a sparring match, while Piccolo uses the Dragon Balls to awaken his latent potential, with Shenlong throwing in a "bit extra" as a bonus. Piccolo then infiltrates the Red Ribbon Army and convinces Pan to go along with their plan to kidnap her and lure out Gohan, hoping to reignite Gohan as a fighter. Together, Gohan and Piccolo battle Gammas #1 and 2, who view them as villains and begin to lose the fight once Piccolo achieves a new form that he dubs "Orange Piccolo". After seeing how the Red Ribbon Army treat Pan, the Androids realize Dr. Hedo was misled and that it is the Red Ribbon Army who are evil. Magenta retreats and is killed by Dr. Hedo, but not before activating Cell Max. Bulma arrives with Goten, Trunks, Kuririn and Android 18, just as the fight against the giant version of Cell begins.
23	Son Gohan's Ultimate Awakening! Chō Kakusei! Son Gohan (超覚醒！孫悟飯)	April 4, 2024; 978-4-08-883885-4	April 29, 2025; 978-1-9747-5281-2
97. "Rampaging Cell Max" (暴走セルマックス, Bōsō Seru Makkusu); 98. "Gamma #2's Resolve" (ガンマ2号の覚悟, Ganma Ni-Gō no Kakugo); 99. "Son Gohan's Ultimate Awakening!" (超覚醒！孫悟飯, Chō Kakusei! Son Gohan); 100. "Burst Forth!—Light of Death!" (炸裂!魔貫光殺砲, Sakuretsu! Makankōsappō)
Goten and Trunks combat Cell Max alongside the Gammas, before fusing into a botched Gotenks. After the others join in and fail to damage Cell Max's only weak spot, his head, Gamma #2 sacrifices himself and severs Cell's left arm. The group then decide to keep Cell occupied so that Gohan, now rejuvenated after eating a Senzu bean, can fully charge up one last all-out attack. When it appears as if Piccolo has been killed, Gohan takes on a new transformation, but it is revealed that Piccolo was shielded by Gamma #1. Piccolo then holds Cell Max in place while Gohan uses Piccolo's Light of Death technique to destroy the giant Android. Afterwards, a remorseful Dr. Hedo and Gamma #1 are employed by Bulma, while Carmine and the remnants of the Red Ribbon Army retreat to their front company, Red Pharmaceuticals. Meanwhile, Vegeta defeats Goku in their sparring battle and Whis finally realizes Bulma had been attempting to contact him.
24	A Legacy Toward the Future; Mirai e no Keishō (未来への継承)	April 4, 2025; 978-4-08-884493-0	March 3, 2026; 978-1-9747-6224-8
101. "Carmine and Soldier 15" (カーマインと15番, Kāmain to Jūgo-Ban); 102. "Son Goku vs. Son Gohan" (孫悟空VS孫悟飯, Son Gokū bui esu Son Gohan); 103. "A Legacy Toward the Future" (未来への継承, Mirai e no Keishō); 104. "The Birth of Saiyaman X" (サイヤマンXの誕生！, Saiyaman Ekkusu no Tanjō!)
After a failed attempt by Carmine and the Red Ribbon Army's Soldier #15 to pit Goten and Trunks against Gohan, all five are brought to Beerus' planet as Goku wants to test Gohan's new form, now dubbed "Beast". After Gohan spars with Goten and Trunks, Goku in his Ultra Instinct form, and Broly, who has made some progress in controlling his anger; a battle royale ensues before the group returns to Earth. Goku then accompanies Gohan and Piccolo to pick up Pan from school, while Carmine, having witnessed the Saiyans' battles, abandons reviving the Red Ribbon Army to genuinely pursue Red Pharmaceuticals instead. It is revealed that Goten and Trunks were inspired to become Saiyaman X-1 and X-2 after Trunks' class went on a field trip to a museum honoring Earth's heroes, including Goku. There, Trunks witnessed Cleangod foil a crime, unaware that it was Gohan filling in for an actor.

== Re-releases ==
=== Digital Colored ===
No.	Release date
1	April 3, 2020
2	April 3, 2020
3	April 3, 2020
4	May 1, 2020
5	June 4, 2020
6	July 3, 2020
7	August 4, 2020
8	September 4, 2020
9	October 2, 2020
10	November 4, 2020
11	December 4, 2020
12	January 4, 2021
13	February 4, 2021
14	March 4, 2021
15	April 2, 2021
16	November 4, 2021
17	December 3, 2021
18	July 4, 2022
19	August 11, 2022
20	June 2, 2023
21	December 4, 2023
22	March 4, 2024
23	July 4, 2024
24	July 4, 2025
