= Dragon Ball: Sparking! Zero =

2024 video game

- Cover art featuring (L-R): Jiren, Broly, Frieza (top), Vegeta, Goku, and Trunks (bottom)
- Developer: Spike Chunsoft
- Publisher: Bandai Namco Entertainment
- Director: Tairi Kikuchi
- Producers: Hiroyuki Kaneko; Jun Furutani
- Programmers: Hiroki Ishikawa; Makoto Kawasaki
- Artist: Satoshi Tsurumi
- Writers: Yosuke Mizuno; Mamiko Takashima,
- Series: Dragon Ball Z: Budokai Tenkaichi
- Engine: Unreal Engine 5
- Platforms: Windows; PlayStation 5; Xbox Series X/S; Nintendo Switch; Nintendo Switch 2
- Release: PC, PS5, Xbox Series X/S: JP: October 10, 2024; WW: October 11, 2024; Switch, Switch 2: WW: November 14, 2025
- Genre: Fighting
- Modes: Single-player, multiplayer

Dragon Ball: Sparking! Zero is a 2024 fighting game developed by Spike Chunsoft and published by Bandai Namco Entertainment. Based on the Dragon Ball franchise created by Akira Toriyama, it is the fourth main installment in the Budokai Tenkaichi series, a sequel to Dragon Ball Z: Budokai Tenkaichi 3 (2007), and the first to be released under the original Sparking! title outside of Japan.

Sparking! Zero was released for PlayStation 5, Xbox Series X/S and Windows on October 11, 2024. Versions for Nintendo Switch and Nintendo Switch 2 were released on November 14, 2025. It received generally positive reviews from critics and became a massive commercial success for Bandai Namco, selling over 5 million units as of February 2025.

== Gameplay ==
Dragon Ball: Sparking! Zero is a 3D team fighting game and expansion onto earlier games such as Budokai Tenkaichi, Budokai Tenkaichi 2, and Budokai Tenkaichi 3, in which players can form a team of five or go alone as Dragon Ball characters and pit them against another team and/or character. The game introduces several new combat systems such as Skill Count, Revenge Counter, and Vanishing Assaults, while retaining the counter and the dash system from previous games. It features both new and returning playable characters, forms, and stages, with the stages containing destructible elements, for a total of 182 playable characters. (Note: 181 plus "Goku (Mini)" from Dragon Ball Daima as a pre-order bonus character.) Players can choose from any one of 100 characters at the beginning of the game, and have to unlock other characters using Zeni, an in-game currency earned by playing the game. The game also has 12 stages at launch.

The game introduces a new mode named "Custom", allowing players to create their own Dragon Ball fight scenarios and share them online with other players. Custom mode is further divided into a simple and a normal mode, allowing players to customize their stages with a variety of tools. The game also includes "Episode Battles", which serve as the game's story mode, following the perspective of eight playable characters: Goku, Vegeta, Piccolo, Gohan, Future Trunks, Frieza, Goku Black, and Jiren. These episodes depict the story of Dragon Ball Z (1989–1996) and Dragon Ball Super (2015–2018), although players can make narrative decisions at various plot points, leading to differing endings from the original that are differentiated as a "Sparking! episode".

=== Downloadable content ===
The game's season pass initially included three downloadable content (DLC) packs for Sparking! Zero. The first, the "Hero of Justice Pack", was released on January 23, 2025. It added eleven characters from the film Dragon Ball Super: Super Hero (2022), including film versions of Gohan and Piccolo (each with four forms), Gamma 1, Gamma 2, and Cell Max. The second and third packs, "Daima Character Pack 1" and "Daima Character Pack 2", introduced characters from the anime series Dragon Ball Daima (2024–2025). These included "Mini" versions of Vegeta (with four forms) and Goku (with two forms), their adult equivalents (Super Saiyan 3 Vegeta and Super Saiyan 4 Goku), Glorio, Panzy, Majin Kuu, Majin Duu, and Gomah (with two forms). The third pack also introduced the "First Demon World" stage. These packs released on April 24 and September 25, 2025, respectively. An extra DLC pack was released on June 26, 2025, featuring the character Shallot from the mobile game Dragon Ball Legends (2018). These expansions increased the game's total playable roster to 208 characters. On October 2, 2025, an anniversary trailer confirmed that a new DLC expansion would be revealed in January 2026. On January 24, 2026, the expansion was showcased, revealing new stages, costumes, a new gameplay mode, and an initial batch of 10 characters: Super Saiyan Bardock, King Piccolo, Hell Fighter 17, Super 17, Devilman, Grandpa Gohan, Champa, Mercenary Tao, Zangya, and Pikkon. On April 19, 2026, the expansion was officially titled Super Limit Breaking Neo, and a new mode called "Limit Breaker Journey" was demonstrated. The trailer revealed 18 additional characters: two new forms for Vegeta (GT), Nuova Shenron (GT), Trunks (GT) alongside his Super Saiyan form, King Vegeta, Cheelai, Jaco, Uub (Z), Salza, Mighty Mask, Supreme Kai, Android 8, Nam, General Blue, Chilled, Fasha, and Tora. The DLC was scheduled for a summer 2026 release. A final trailer on July 23, 2026, revealed new character skills, attacks, and the final 5 characters: Goku (World Tournament), Tien Shinhan (World Tournament), Chi-Chi, and Piccolo alongside his Giant Form (under the name Ma Junior). The DLC pack was subsequently released on July 30, 2026.

== Development ==
Sparking! Zero was developed by Spike Chunsoft, and it was the first game in the Budokai Tenkaichi series since Dragon Ball Z: Tenkaichi Tag Team (2010) for the PlayStation Portable. The team described having a large roster of characters for the game was "challenging" since they cannot reuse any assets from the older games. Sparking! Zero, unlike Dragon Ball FighterZ (2018), was not envisioned as an eSports game. Some characters, if they are weaker in the Dragon Ball canon, will remain weak in the game. To keep the game balanced, the team introduced the "cost" system. Each player only has a predetermined cost in each round, and stronger characters will cost much more than the weaker characters. It was developed using Unreal Engine 5.

The game was revealed at The Game Awards 2023 by publisher Bandai Namco Entertainment. It was released on October 11, 2024, for Windows, PlayStation 5 and Xbox Series X and Series S. A season pass will also be available, giving players access to three downloadable content packs that is expected to introduce more than 20 new characters.

Sparking! Zero marked the final performance of Tōru Furuya as the voice of Yamcha, following a scandal earlier in that same year that caused him to step down from the role.

== Reception ==
=== Critical reception ===
Reception

Aggregate scores
Aggregator	Score
Metacritic	(PC) 83/100 (PS5) 81/100 (XSX) 83/100 (NS2) 76/100
OpenCritic	86% recommend

Review scores
Publication	Score
Eurogamer	4/5
Famitsu	34/40
GameSpot	6/10
GamesRadar+	3/5
Hardcore Gamer	3.5/5 stars
HobbyConsolas	90%
IGN	7/10
Nintendo Life	8/10 stars
PC Gamer (US)	80/100
VG247	4/5
The Games Machine	8.8/10

The game received "generally favorable reviews" from critics according to the review aggregation website Metacritic. Fellow review aggregator OpenCritic assessed that the game received strong approval, being recommended by 86% of critics. In Japan, four critics from Famitsu gave the game a total score of 34 out of 40.

Lewis Parker from Eurogamer described it as a "polished" and "rich" experience. While commenting that players did not need to be a fan of the series to enjoy it, it was "everything Dragon Ball fans will have wanted". He praised the extensive amount of fan service present in the game, singling out the Episode Battles and their branching player paths. Scott McCrae from PC Gamer described it as one of the best Dragon Ball games ever released, and wrote that the game was "mechanically complex". Concluding his review, he praised the game for successfully capturing "the magic of the original Tenkaichi games", and felt that its approach to storytelling and its diverse roster of characters "serve as the ultimate celebration of Akira Toriyama's classic".

Jarrett Green from IGN criticized the game's menu for being cumbersome. While he appreciated the team for introducing branching paths to the story, he felt that battles in the story can become frustrating, as players need to perform very specific feats during combat in order to reach a new story path. Ian Walker from GamesRadar called the game the "ultimate toybox" and praised the customization options offered in the Custom mode, adding that it will likely provide "hours upon hours of creative fulfillment after finishing everything else the game has to offer". However, he was disappointed by the game's enemy artificial intelligence for encouraging repetitive combat tactics, and remarked that the game lacked "the depth of its more serious competition to the point of becoming rote". Jason Fanelli from GameSpot praised the game's visuals for being "visually stunning" and wrote that it did a "serviceable job instant-transmissioning the Budokai Tenkaichi format into the modern age", though he was disappointed by the limited mode variety, the repetitive combat system, and characters sharing the same control scheme. Several critics remarked that the game's tutorial mode was not intuitive enough for players to truly understand the game's mechanics.

=== Sales ===
More than 3 million copies of the game were sold within the game's first day of release. According to Bandai Namco, about 90% of the sales for the game came from North America and Europe. It was the third best-selling video game in the UK, and the second best-selling video game in the US in October 2024. It went on to become the best-selling Dragon Ball game in the US, the fourth best-selling game in the US in 2024, and the third best-selling Bandai Namco game, trailing only behind Dark Souls III and Elden Ring. By February 2025, sales of 5 million had been reached.

=== Awards and accolades ===
Year	Ceremony	Category	Result	Ref.
2024	The Game Awards 2024	Best Fighting Game	Nominated	
2024	The Steam Awards	Best Game You Suck At	Nominated	
2025	28th Annual D.I.C.E. Awards	Fighting Game of the Year	Nominated	
