= Jiren (Dragon Ball) =

Fictional character from Dragon Ball

- Dragon Ball character
- Jiren as depicted in Dragon Ball Super
- First appearance: Dragon Ball Super episode #85: "The Universes Go Into Action -- Each With Their Own Motives" (2017)
- Created by: Akira Toriyama; Toyotarou
- Voiced by: Japanese: Eiji Hanawa; English: Patrick Seitz

In-universe information
- Alias: Jiren the Grey

Jiren (Japanese: ジレン), also known as Jiren the Grey (Japanese: 灰色のジレン, Hepburn: Haiiro no Jiren), is a fictional character in Dragon Ball created by Akira Toriyama. Within the series, Jiren hails from Universe 11, a parallel universe to Universe 2. He is the strongest member of the Pride Troopers, a heroic organization that defends their universe against evil-doers. Jiren is the primary antagonist and anti-hero of the Tournament of Power saga in Dragon Ball Super, where eight 10-person teams compete in a multiverse-oriented fighting competition to ensure the survival of their respective universes. Jiren is considered to be the strongest amongst the participants, as his power is said to rival or even surpass those of the universes' deities; his goal is to be given access to the Super Dragon Balls by winning the tournament. He quickly establishes a rivalry with the series protagonist, Goku, which lead the two to engage in a series of intense battles that eventually leads Goku to gaining new power and an ability.

Jiren's debut is in Episode 85 of the Dragon Ball Super anime, whereas his first appearance for the Dragon Ball Super manga is in Chapter 30. Jiren is voiced by Eiji Hanawa in Japanese, and by Patrick Seitz in the English localization by Funimation.

Jiren has been met with an overall mixed critical reception. Some reviewers have praised his involvement in the series, whereas others criticized his backstory as unpersuasive and shallow.

== Creation and conception ==
Jiren is an extraterrestrial being with a humanoid stature. His visage is reminiscent of the grey alien archetype, with a pair of grey eyes that has enlarged black pupils and a very muscular physique. As a member of the Pride Troopers, Jiren wears their standardized red and black costumed uniform with white gloves and boots. Jiren's visual design for the Dragon Ball Super manga is illustrated by Toyotarou, although his initial concept underwent some significant corrections by Toriyama as oversight for the final product. One major difference is that Toriyama inverted Toyotarou's body design for Jiren, by reducing the thickness of his lower body and accentuating his upper body. Toriyama also spread apart Jiren's eyes and drew it to be more square in shape.

Megumi Ishitani, the director of Episode 131 of the Dragon Ball Super anime series, provided a lengthy explanation of Jiren's character motivations during the Universal Survival arc in response to a question about his character development on the social discussion website Reddit. She said that Jiren's belief in the concept of "solitude is strength" is influenced by his tragic past, and that his own power had reinforced the validity of this belief until Episode 130 when he loses to Goku, a rival who had grown strong through his allies. Ishitani indicated that as a result of experiencing a crisis of faith and loses the opportunity to fight Goku on even terms, Jiren is unable to draw out his full power as he is plagued with self-doubt and emotional loss when he is forced to fight Frieza and Android 17, both of whom he consider to be unworthy opponents. Ishitani indicated that his emotional state and will to fight improves after receiving a show of support by his Pride Trooper teammate, and especially after he is confronted by a revived Goku who has regained some of his strength, due to his respect for Goku and for getting a second chance to finish their fight. On a scene where Jiren's barrier shatters like glass following a combined attack of Goku and his allies, Ishitani described it as conveying the visual cue that "there is now nothing separating Jiren from Goku and the others", and that Jiren's smile is intended to imply that he has broken through his emotional shell.

In an interview with Comic Book Resources, Jiren's English voice actor Patrick Seitz noted that Jiren is "so overpowered and they're setting him up to be such a badass that he didn't really have to try at all", and as a result he did not need to exert his voice until later in the series. On the issue of vocal health awareness which concerns voice acting for animation works, and with the context that characters are known to be depicted with a high frequency of yelling and screaming during fight scenes in the Dragon Ball series, Seitz indicated that he is happy to be playing a character like Jiren at a later stage in his career where he has since learned how to apply a judicious yet effective use of his vocal abilities.

== Abilities ==
Despite his humble origins, Jiren is regarded as one of the most powerful mortal beings among the twelve universes in the Dragon Ball mythos. Jiren was once considered as a candidate to become a God of Destruction – deities who are concerned with balancing the development of the universe they preside over by selectively destroying planets, civilizations or external threats. Due to his refusal, the position went to the Pride Trooper leader, Toppo (トッポ) or Top in the English localization of the anime, who is Jiren's friend and superior instead. His power level is said to have surpassed his universe's God of Destruction, Belmod (ベルモッド) or Vermoud in the English localization of the anime. In the manga, it is claimed that Jiren's strength and growth is immeasurable and that he is able to quickly adapt and become more capable on the battlefield.

Jiren possesses superhuman speed, strength, durability and reflexes, all of which are magnified to incredibly high levels. With ki energy manipulation, Jiren can fly and can use ki blasts for offensive uses and barriers for defense. His signature attack is Power Impact (パワーインパクト Pawā Inpakuto) which fires an energy ball that travels far enough until it discharges into an explosion, or it can also be used in different variations. He can also widen his eyes to create an invisible projection of force to repel attacks.

== Appearances ==
=== Dragon Ball Super anime ===
Jiren is first shown meditating, prior to being invited by the Pride Troopers, and Vermoud to participate in the Tournament of Power. Initially, Jiren appears to be aloof and uninterested, despite the risk of the losing universes being erased from existence by Zeno, but later relented when Vermoud announced that the winner would be granted the Super Dragon Balls for a wish. Arriving in the Null Realm for the tournament alongside the Pride Troopers, Goku from Universe 7 attempted to greet him, only to be harshly rejected.

During the tournament, Jiren mostly remains inactive in spite of most of the Pride Troopers being eliminated from the tournament early on, but remains an intimidating force throughout. When Kale, a Saiyan from Universe 6 goes berserk, Jiren immediately approaches and incapacitates her with little effort. He was also able to repel the Light of Love technique from Universe 2's Ribrianne and swiftly eliminated Universe 3's Maji Kayo with a single punch after Maji Kayo threatened to torture Dyspo, one of the Pride Trooper's and Universe 11's contestants.

Jiren ultimately fights against Goku, with the former easily holding the advantage and dominating the latter by a wide margin. In desperation, Goku uses the Spirit Bomb from energy collected from his teammates. Jiren manages to overcome the Spirit Bomb, but Goku emerges in a new transformation, Ultra Instinct. In this new state, Goku is able to fight Jiren more effectively and surprise him for a few moments before the forms gives out, allowing Jiren to defeat him again. Soon afterwards, he is confronted by Hit, the strongest fighter of Universe 6, who, despite being overwhelmed, manages to trap him using his time manipulation abilities. Despite this, Jiren breaks free of Hit's trap and immediately eliminates him from the tournament. Seeing that he has defeated Goku and Hit, whom he perceived were the two greatest threats to him in the tournament, Jiren retreats to meditate while the remaining two Universe 11 fighters, Top and Dyspo carried on with the fighting.

Jiren awakens from his meditation upon sensing that Goku reactivated his Ultra Instinct form during his battle against Kefla, the Potara fusee of two Universe 6 Saiyans, Caulifla and Kale. He would continue to observe the battlefield until only Universe 7 and Universe 11 remained. He challenged Goku again and shares a vague explanation of his wish by stating that he seeks "what is beyond strength". He is then met by Vegeta who manages to out-maneuver and deliver a series of attacks before Jiren quickly incapacitates him. Vegeta later recovers, unleashes a limit-breaking transformation and allies with Goku to battle Jiren again, with the latter commending on how Goku and Vegeta are improving. The battle continues until Jiren stops to muse about Top's transformation as a God of Destruction and Vegeta departing to fight against Top, leaving only Goku to deal with. After Top is defeated, Jiren promptly calls him pathetic for throwing away his ideals and losing and praising Vegeta for holding on to his beliefs. He then proceeds to power up and stop holding back. Despite the aid of Android 17 and Frieza, Goku and Vegeta are unable to faze Jiren for too long, as he is able to successfully counterattack.

Vermoud then recites Jiren's backstory, and explained that one day when Jiren was still a child, he found his home, village and parents killed by a mysterious, malevolent individual. Jiren was then adopted and trained by a martial arts teacher, alongside others to avenge Jiren's parents, until he encountered the evil figure again, during which Jiren's teacher and most of his disciples were killed. Not willing to avenge their comrades, the remaining students abandoned Jiren, causing him to believe in one's own strength as an absolute goal towards justice and that trust in others is unnecessary. Jiren would later train and fight on his own, ultimately joining the Pride Troopers later on. Jiren cuts off Vermoud's speech before re-engaging Android 17, who criticized him for being disdainful of his teammates and for only being focused on himself, before Jiren powers up a large energy attack to destroy the tournament area. However, Android 17 uses a self-destruct bomb and seemingly sacrifices himself to nullify Jiren's attack, preventing Goku and Vegeta from being eliminated. Vegeta confronts Jiren again, despite suffering from exhaustion due to his battle with Top. Jiren toys with Vegeta and severely injures him, despite the Saiyan refusing to give up, before eliminating him.

Goku recovers after receiving energy from Vegeta before his elimination and resumes his fight against Jiren, activating his Ultra Instinct form again midway through. The fight intensifies as Goku begins to persevere throughout and Jiren becoming more destructive. Ultimately, Goku masters his Ultra Instinct form, attaining an even more advanced stage of the transformation, and begins to overwhelm Jiren. Fearing that he might lose, Jiren becomes infuriated and unleashes his full power on Goku, and even launches an intentional attack at the tournament's spectator stands in a fit of rage and denial, potentially harming Goku's allies and his own Pride Trooper comrades. Goku deflects the attack and pummels Jiren harshly to the brink of defeat, but his Ultra Instinct form wears out, causing Goku to be immobilized and exhausted with excessive pain. Jiren reluctantly takes this advantage to eliminate Goku, but is saved by Frieza who is joined by Android 17 for a final battle. Jiren battles Frieza and Android 17, but his exhaustion catches up and the latter two are able to overwhelm him. However, a short motivational speech from Top allows Jiren to regain his footing and fight back. Goku also pulls back from his exhaustion and repels an energy blast intending to eliminate Frieza and Android 17. Jiren then launches a final attack, but the combined teamwork of Goku, Frieza and Android 17 manages to overwhelm and eliminate him, allowing Universe 7 to win the tournament. Before he is erased alongside his allies and universe, Goku offers a truce and rematch, to which Jiren accepts. He is later resurrected by Android 17's wish, after which Jiren reconsiders his philosophy and agrees to work with Top and the Pride Troopers as true companions and to have a rematch against Universe 7 in the future.

=== Dragon Ball Super manga ===
Jiren (right) as depicted in Volume 9 of the Dragon Ball Super manga series

The manga version of Jiren is different from his anime counterpart, as he is less reserved in nature and has no reservations about informing others of his motivations and what his wish would be should he gain access to the Super Dragon Balls by winning the Tournament of Power. He first appears by assisting his Pride Trooper comrades in defeating a large monster and sealing it inside a capsule. He is then greeted by Belmod who announces the Tournament of Power. Jiren initially refuses, but accepts after Belmod tells him about the Super Dragon Balls. During the tournament, he is met by Universe 7's Goku whom he promptly tells to go away. After Goku challenges the Pride Troopers briefly, he takes on Jiren during the first five minutes of the tournament, but Goku is eventually saved by Hit of Universe 6, who takes Goku's place. Jiren defeats and eliminates Hit after luring him to a false sense of security before facing off against Goku again. During Kale's rampage, Goku suggests Jiren to help out his teammates, to which he refuses, stating it as unnecessary. The two fight again, only to be interrupted by Master Roshi who manages to dodge Jiren's attacks with his martial arts skill. Despite this, Jiren is able to eliminate him quickly, but is then confronted by Goku who has managed to activate his Ultra Instinct form. The two fight again, with Goku reverting to normal very quickly.

Nearing the end of the tournament, Dyspo and Toppo, at a severe disadvantage, ask Jiren for help to which he retorts by having them observe "from the bench" allowing the two to be eliminated. Vegeta then challenges Jiren, followed by Android 17 and Frieza. Jiren is able to easily overpower them, with Android 17 resorting to self-destruct to take him down. Jiren recovers, disappointed that Android 17 seemingly sacrificed himself for nothing and encounters Goku again. Goku awakens Ultra Instinct, with Jiren responding by powering himself up. Goku and Jiren clash once more, but Goku masters Ultra Instinct midway through and starts to dominate and overwhelm Jiren, until the transformation wore off, allowing Jiren to retake the advantage and nearly knock Goku off the tournament arena. Goku is saved by Vegeta, who engages in battle. Jiren then states that he wants the Super Dragon Balls to wish back his former master, Gicchin, to which Belmod and Toppo claim that Jiren wants approval and recognition from his former master. Vegeta criticizes Jiren for wanting a selfish wish, prompting Jiren to attack him, but Goku resurfaces and the two Saiyans manage to fight back.

Eventually, Jiren grows frustrated, and tackles a combined Kamehameha and Final Flash blast after powering up. Jiren reappears damaged from the attack and promptly eliminates Vegeta from the tournament before taking on a worn out Goku, swiftly overpowering him. Suddenly, Frieza shows up, preparing a Death Ball, telling Goku to grab Jiren from behind. Although Goku manages to hold on to Jiren behind, he deflects Frieza's attack, only for the latter to surprise him by colliding onto Jiren and Goku head on. The force of the blow knocked Goku, Jiren and Frieza off of the arena, eliminating all three of them before Android 17 reveals himself from under the battlefield's rubble. Before Universe 11's erasure, Jiren admits to Belmod that he acknowledges Gicchin does not want to be revived and that he understood what his former master wanted from him. Shortly afterwards, he is revived by the Super Dragon Balls via Android 17's wish.

=== In other media ===
Jiren made his first video game appearance in Super Dragon Ball Heroes, as well as its promotional anime. He was later announced as a DLC character for the Extra Pack 2 bundle for Dragon Ball Xenoverse 2, one of six DLC characters introduced by FighterZ Pass 2 of Dragon Ball FighterZ, and as a playable character for Dragon Ball Z: Dokkan Battle. Jiren, along with two of his Pride Trooper teammates and his universe's God of Destruction, makes a cameo appearance in the 2018 film Dragon Ball Super: Broly. Several variations of Jiren has been released in Dragon Ball Legends. He is featured in Dragon Ball: Sparking! Zero with a prominent placement on the cover.

== Cultural impact ==
Jiren has been described as a popular character with series fans by Ian Walker from Kotaku, Brian Bove from Syfy, and Adam Newell from Dot Esports. He placed third by fan vote in a poll of Dragon Ball antagonists published by the March 2018 issue of V Jump. Jiren became the subject of fan works which circulated among Spanish-speaking fans over the internet.

=== Critical reception ===
Critical reception towards the character has been mixed. Nick Valdez from Comicbook.com said Jiren stands out as a morally ambiguous villain because he is in fact a hero in his own universe, and that he "chooses to avoid fighting for fighting's sake" in spite of his strength. In his review of Episode 107 of the Dragon Ball Super anime for IGN, Shawn Saris praised the show for effectively "conveying the respect and fear that Jiren's allies have for him", which develops Jiren's enigmatic persona as well as his interest in the character. Saris said that Episodes 109 and 110 further reinforced his view of the show's restrained yet competent handling of Jiren as a character, which maintains a "near perfect pacing" which helps make the episodes an enjoyable watch. Saris observed that Jiren's character was developed to such a degree that Super would be remiss to not bring him back for future stories, and assessed the final battle between Jiren and Goku's allies in Episode 130 as being "one of the best battles in Dragon Ball history". Stefan Sgarioto from Madman Entertainment named Jiren as the third most memorable villain of the Dragon Ball series and praised the contrast between his virtuous traits and his role as an antagonistic character.

Conversely, Saris criticized the delivery and content of Jiren's backstory in his review of Episode 127, who commented that the murder of Jiren's parents is "an incredibly weak excuse for such a powerful character and did virtually nothing to make him more interesting". In an opinion piece, Valdez expressed disappointment in Jiren's backstory and echoed Saris' sentiment that it does not fit a character like Jiren. Valdez noted that his origin story felt generic and does not live up to the extraordinary backstories of other antagonistic characters in the series, such as Beerus or Vegeta, as it does not adequately explain his power level or change in attitude. Valdez was of the view that Jiren lost his mystique as a character due to the reveal of his backstory, and that its delivery or place in the series overall was also problematic besides the issue of content quality, though he acknowledged that there were high expectations on the character to succeed as he was meant to be the final antagonist of the anime series for the foreseeable future. On the character's abandonment of his sense of nobility out of desperation, Sam Stone from Comic Book Resources commented that "the move to deliberately kill innocents is an unexpected dark turn for Jiren, as someone who had previously kept to his own moral code throughout the competition".
