= Bardock =

Fictional character from the Dragon Ball franchise

- Dragon Ball character
- Bardock as depicted in the television special, Dragon Ball Z: Bardock – The Father of Goku (1990).
- First appearance: Dragon Ball Z: Bardock – The Father of Goku (1990)
- Created by: Takao Koyama; Katsuyuki Sumisawa
- Designed by: Katsuyoshi Nakatsuru; Akira Toriyama
- Voiced by: Japanese: Masako Nozawa; English: Sonny Strait (Funimation); David Gasman (AB Groupe; Cooler's Revenge); Doug Rand (AB Groupe; The Father of Goku); Curtis "Takahata101" Arnott (Dragon Ball Z Abridged)

In-universe information
- Species: Saiyan
- Occupation: Mercenary
- Spouse: Gine (wife)
- Children: Kakarot / Goku (youngest son); Raditz (eldest son)
- Relatives: Chi-Chi (daughter-in-law); Gohan (grandson); Goten (grandson); Videl (granddaughter-in-law); Pan (great-granddaughter); Son Goku Jr. (great-great-great-great-great-grandson; Dragon Ball GT)
- Abilities: Super strength; Super speed, agility and reflexes; Stamina; Flight; Sensing energy; Energy projection; Durability; Precognition; Telepathy; Telekinesis

Bardock (バーダック, Bādakku), Burdock in Viz Media's English manga translation, is a fictional character in the Dragon Ball series. Created by Toei Animation based on series protagonist Goku's visual design by franchise creator Akira Toriyama, he appears in the television special Dragon Ball Z: Bardock – The Father of Goku (1990), but the first time he appears in the canon Dragon Ball universe is in the 78th episode of Dragon Ball Z in a flashback of Frieza destroying planet Vegeta. Bardock has few overall manga and anime appearances within the series, though he plays a pivotal part as Goku's biological father in setting up the backstory of his son, originally known by the name Kakarot, as one of the last survivors of the Saiyan genocide by Frieza.

Bardock has been well received by commentators and viewers as a tragic figure. Toriyama himself was moved by the character's story, which led to his decision to incorporate the character into the series' canon continuity through the Jaco the Galactic Patrolman manga bonus chapter "Dragon Ball −(Minus): The Departure of the Fated Child" (2014). Bardock's popularity has led to the character appearing in a variety of franchise media, including several video games as well as a starring role in the 2011 spin-off manga Dragon Ball: Episode of Bardock and its subsequent animated adaptation.

== Characteristics ==
Bardock is a mercenary first introduced in the television special Dragon Ball Z: Bardock – The Father of Goku (1990) as the leader of a platoon of Saiyan warriors. Within the series, the Saiyans are depicted as a warlike species who display a wide array of special abilities, possessing immense natural strength, ki energy manipulation, as well as superhuman agility, reflexes and senses. With the exception of their monkey-like tails, which enables the transformation of an individual in view of a full moon into a Great Ape, Saiyans have the same outward appearance as humans but with larger, more muscular builds.

Franchise creator Akira Toriyama explained in an interview published in the March 2014 issue of Saikyō Jump that Bardock and his wife Gine (ギネ) are among the rare Saiyans who are joined by an emotional bond as opposed to a practical reproductive purpose. Gine was at one point a member of a four-person team of Saiyan warriors along with Bardock where they developed feelings for each other, though Gine eventually retired from the team as she is not an effective fighter due to her gentle nature. Toriyama considers Bardock to be one of the strongest low-class warriors, but below a mid-class warrior in power. On the depiction of Bardock's bravery in the film Dragon Ball Super: Broly (2018), director Tatsuya Nagamine explained in a January 2019 interview with V Jump that he considers the character to be the only Saiyan left who retains his people's pure nature, whereas the rest of the Saiyans have lost their original pride as a warrior race prior to the events of the film. Bardock's facial features are very similar to his son Kakarot, which has led to certain characters, who knew Bardock, recognizing the familial relationship between the two characters when they encounter Goku.

Bardock's signature ability is the "Final Spirit Cannon" (ファイナルスピリッツキャノン) or "Riot Javelin", an energy sphere attack. During a routine incursion on the planet Kanassa in Bardock – The Father of Goku, one of its surviving inhabitants strikes Bardock, giving him its native ability to see into the future.

== Conception and creation ==
Bardock's basic design was originally conceived for the Bardock – The Father of Goku special by Toei Animation production staff. Animator and character designer Katsuyoshi Nakatsuru was primarily responsible for designing Bardock and his team members during production of the special in mid-1990. His initial design of Bardock was relatively unchanged after it went through minor alterations by Toriyama, who recalled that a Toei employee approached him about their project for an original story based on the visual design of a character who has the same face as Goku, of which Toriyama had no recollection of creating. Toriyama said that he allowed Toei Animation to have creative control for the animated television special as he was too busy with the manga serialization for the Dragon Ball series at the time. He believed that he was consulted about the character designs as Toei's proposed original content impinged upon Goku's past; Bardock's face was given a scar while his cold and stern demeanour represents the brutal edge of a martial race, but is otherwise nearly identical to Goku. He is dressed in battle armor similar to Frieza's armed forces; according to Nakatsuru, the armor's specific visual design is patterned after that of Toshiro Mifune's character in Seven Samurai at the insistence of Mitsuo Hashimoto, director of the television special.

Toriyama commented that Toei's depiction of Bardock in the finished product was admirable. He said that he tends to avoid serious material in his work and he would have stuck to a lighter comedic tone had he authored Bardock's story himself, but complimented Toei's approach for giving a bit more emotional depth to the series' mythos. Toriyama noted that the character's name is "strong-sounding" and a pun on burdock, which is thematically connected to his sons' Saiyan names and to his usual practice of naming Saiyan characters after vegetables. Toriyama decided to have the character appear in the original manga. Bardock is depicted in two panels during Goku's first confrontation with Frieza, who comments that Goku looks just like the Saiyan who resisted when he destroyed planet Vegeta, and the narrator informs the reader that he was Goku's father.^{[ch. 307]}

=== Voice actors ===
Bardock is voiced in Japanese by Masako Nozawa, who also voices his son and the other male members of his family, except Raditz. Sonny Strait is Bardock's most consistent voice actor for English localizations in the series' Funimation dub as well as most media. Strait noted that he has done much more voice acting work for Bardock's appearances in video games, in comparison to his animated appearances. Bardock is voiced by Curtis "Takahata101" Arnott in Dragon Ball Z Abridged.

== Abilities ==
Due to his Saiyan biology, Bardock has enhanced strength, speed, agility, durability, reflexes and the power of flight. He also possessed a degree of clairvoyance and the following abilities: energy generation and manipulation through the utilization of ki, sensing power levels via his scouter and enhancing his physical abilities through sheer force of will. Bardock's Saiyan genetics and possession of a tail allowed him to transform into a Great Ape when exposed to the energy radiating from a full moon.

== Appearances ==
=== Bardock – The Father of Goku (1990) ===
Following the conquest of planet Kanassa led by his team, Bardock began to see visions of Frieza's plan to destroy planet Vegeta, as well as Goku's future on Earth. After his son is set to be transported away from their homeworld to Earth, he attempts to prevent the destruction of his species by challenging Frieza in the orbit of planet Vegeta, but is obliterated by Frieza. Before his death, however, Bardock has one final vision of Goku challenging Frieza, and dies smiling knowing his son is destined to avenge their people's annihilation.

=== Episode of Bardock (2011) ===
Dragon Ball: Episode of Bardock by Naho Ōishi is a "what-if story" which explores Bardock's miraculous survival from being obliterated by Frieza's attack. He is hurled into the distant past to a strange planet where he comes into conflict with Frieza's ancestor, Chilled, and eventually succeeds in achieving the Super Saiyan transformation. The manga was later adapted into an animated short film.

=== "Dragon Ball Minus" (2014) ===
In "Dragon Ball Minus: The Departure of the Fated Child", a story included in the collected volume of Jaco the Galactic Patrolman which takes place months before the destruction of Planet Vegeta, Bardock believes that Frieza is up to something when they receive an order for all Saiyans to return home. Gine, who makes her first series appearance, is convinced by Bardock to send their infant son, Kakarot, in a space pod to Earth, a planet far enough away to escape Frieza's interest and one with a native population weak enough to pose no threat to Kakarot. Bardock's personality is reinterpreted as a caring father who is no longer apathetic towards his son, and he lacks the unrepentant nature displayed in Bardock – The Father of Goku. Gine is presented as a warm and kind mother who loves her sons deeply.

=== Broly (2018) ===
Broly presents an adapted version of Goku's origin story from Minus that led to him being sent to Earth. Goku is depicted as a toddler for the film's iteration of his origin story, and is visibly upset about leaving his parents behind. Bardock decides to send Goku to Earth so he can escape the impending destruction of their home planet, which leads to an emotional farewell where Gine implores the departing Goku to not forget them.

=== Dragon Ball Super manga (2021–2022) ===
Bardock appears in the flashback scenes of the Dragon Ball Super manga during chapter 77, which takes place after Goku's birth and prior to "Dragon Ball Minus". During an invasion on Planet Cereal, led by Frieza's army, Bardock was able to rescue the Namekian sage Monaito and a young Cerelian named Granolah. However, he was unable to save Granolah's mother, Muezli, when Elec, the leader of Frieza's former brokers, the Heeters mercilessly shot her on her chest at point blank. Bardock was able to defeat a Heeter named Gas and survive the battle to ensure the safety of Granolah and Monaito.

Back in the present day, Vegeta knew who Bardock was, and tells Goku that he was the latter's father, much to Granolah, Monaito and Goku's surprise.

=== Super Dragon Ball Heroes (2020–2023) ===
An alternate reality version of the character appears in the Super Dragon Ball Heroes promotional anime. In several promos, Bardock allies with the time patrol, a future force bent to avert the changes in time, and turns into the Super Sayian 3 form. In the series Space-Time-War arc, another alternate version Bardock is portrayed as a mysterious cloaked warrior. He assists his son Goku and company against other foes, including a masked Goku Black. Black recognized Bardock during their fight and acknowledges to Black that he had left his past life a long time ago. In the climax of the arc, it is revealed that Bardock, along with several other cloaked fighters are working with a woman named Aeos, a supreme kai. In the following arc, Bardock serves as one of Aeos's bodyguards as she hosts a Tournament across the multiverse, similar to the Tournament of Power from Dragon Ball Super. He also fights a two on one battle with Goku and Jiren in his Super Sayian 3 form.

=== Video games ===
Bardock has appeared in nearly 30 Dragon Ball video games, including substantial storyline roles in Dragon Ball Online (2010) as well as its spiritual successors Dragon Ball Xenoverse (2015) and Dragon Ball Xenoverse 2 (2016). In March 2018 Bardock was introduced into Dragon Ball FighterZ (2018) along with Broly as the game's first DLC characters. Bardock also appeared in Dragon Ball: Sparking! Zero, with both his Dragon Ball Z and Dragon Ball Super outfits available. He later received his Super Saiyan form from History of Bardock in the Super Limit Break Neo DLC.

== Merchandise ==
Shadow Studio released a highly detailed collectible statue depicting Bardock and Gine witnessing Goku's departure in a space pod.

== Reception ==
Bardock has received a positive reception. Both Nick Valdez and Evan Valentine from Comicbook.com described him as one of the most influential and popular characters in the Dragon Ball franchise in spite of his limited appearances. Kofi Outlaw, also from Comicbook.com, was of the view that Broly "created a lot of new room for a much more noble and (anti-)heroic version of Bardock to become part of the modern Dragon Ball series", and suggested that the character should be brought back into canon continuity in some form. Strait was of the opinion that Bardock's consistent appearances in the franchise's licensed video games have contributed significantly towards the character's enduring popularity. Jemima Sebastián from the Latin American edition of IGN commented that the destruction of the Saiyan homeworld is one of the most important and emotional moments in Dragon Ball history; she also noted that fan interest in Bardock inspired a story arc in Dragon Ball Multiverse, a Dragon Ball fan fiction webcomic, where Frieza never destroyed planet Vegeta and Bardock is the central character and leader of a popular revolt against Frieza. Bardock is ranked number 11 on IGN's list of "Top 13 Dragon Ball Z Characters"; Chris Carle said Bardock's impact in the series' overall story is quite large even though his major appearances are confined to the animated films and expanded literature. Carle noted that the character has passed on his virtuous traits to Goku, and hope to see father and son being depicted fighting side by side one day. Bardock came in 28th place on Complex's list "A Ranking of All the Characters on 'Dragon Ball Z"; Sheldon Pearce notes that the character exists as a means to shed more light on Goku's character. Megan Peters, also from Comicbook.com, opined that Goku's final moment with Bardock and Gine as he departs the Saiyan homeworld in a space pod is one of the most heartbreaking moments in the series.

Critical commentary of Bardock's role in the series, particularly his revised personality observed in Minus and Broly, drew comparisons to the Superman character Jor-El by multiple sources. In an opinion piece published by RPP, Erich García criticized the changes made to Bardock's characterization as well as the effective retcon of events that took place in Bardock – The Father of Goku. Garcia disliked the exclusion of Bardock's teammates who were said to form the emotional core of Bardock – The Father of Goku, and argued that the notion of Bardock being presented as a loving father is less compelling compared to the character's original introduction as a cold and distant parent who only cares about revenge against Frieza. Garcia also claimed that Minus and Broly introduced several inconsistencies between the aforementioned works, such as Goku's age at the time of his departure from the Saiyan homeworld.
