= Vanitas (The Case Study of Vanitas) =

Fictional character from The Case Study of Vanitas

- The Case Study of Vanitas character
- Vanitas, as illustrated by Jun Mochizuki
- First appearance: "Vanitas: In the Event of Rusty Hopes" (2015)
- Created by: Jun Mochizuki
- Voiced by: Natsuki Hanae (Japanese); Zeno Robinson, Cherami Leigh (young) (English)

In-universe information
- Alias: 69, Vincent
- Family: Vanitas of the Blue Moon (guardian); Mikhail (adoptive brother)

Vanitas (Japanese: ヴァニタス, Hepburn: Vanitasu) is the fictional protagonist and title character of the manga series The Case Study of Vanitas, which was written and illustrated by Jun Mochizuki. The character was named Vanitas of the Blue Moon, making him part of the Blue Moon clan with some vampire abilities. Vanitas possesses a grimoire called The Book of Vanitas (ヴァニタスの書, Vanitasu no Sho), which can restore vampires who have become "curse-bearers" with uncontrolled bloodlust due to the corruption of their names. He enlists the vampire Noé Archiviste in his quest.

Mochizuki conceived Vanitas as a vampire character during a trip to France, but she changed her mind and made him human after talking with her editor. The character was written to contrast with Noé's personality while his actions are meant to highlight the series' theme of identity due to how he heals vampires. In the anime adaptation, the character was voiced by Natsuki Hanae in the Japanese version. Zeno Robinson voiced him in the English dub, while Cherami Leigh provided the voice of his younger self.

Critics gave Vanitas a positive reception as a result of his quirks and enigmatic identity; with good charactization and development, several writers noted he hides a past that traumatizes him.

== Creation ==
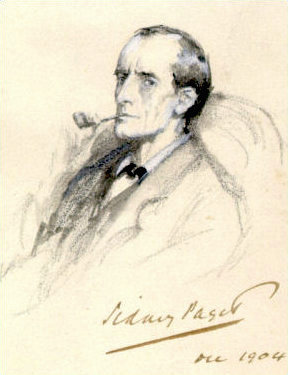
Sherlock Holmes was a major inspiration for Vanitas.

Following Pandora Hearts, Jun Mochizuki wanted to draw vampires in a high school setting. Vanitas was originally intended to be a vampire and the series' only main character. Following the creation of Noé Archiviste, Mochizuki decided to tell the story of Vanitas from Noé's point of view. While visiting Mont Saint-Michel, France, she mused on drawing the story of a vampire who had watched over an island for about 100 years. Everything else about The Case Study of Vanitas came from that idea, and the general forms of Vanitas and Noé were created. Mochizuki thought about doing multiple things after Pandora Hearts, like adding more romance and battle elements. The head editor told her to reduce them because she was not skilled at writing those. She started thinking about drawing more, believing they would be more appealing the more she practised.

Initially, Vanitas was a vampire and Noé was human. Drawing from Sherlock Holmes, Vanitas took the role of Holmes and Noé of Dr. Watson, but her boss called the idea generic. She was eventually suggested to switch the protagonists' roles, which she found more striking. A friend criticized Mochizuki's design for Vanitas' hair so she gave him two-level side bangs. Mochizuki called Vanitas' regular clothing "The Outfit That Nobody Understands" due to his multiple accessories. The color of his vest stripes depended on the artist's mood and, while clarifying Vanitas is a human, she gave hands a claw-like appearance a result of the gloves he wears. Due to the lead's contrasting natures, Mochizuki wrote them to avoid turning them into friends. She did not have any specific points of fixation about expressions but she usually redrew the expression several times in each panel. The character's name comes from the title of a book of illustrations Mochizuki found by chance. When checking the meaning, "Deceiving", she realized it refers to a type of subject in art in which people see skeletons, skulls, food and other symbols. The title of this type of work is often "vanitas". Mochizuki liked it and decided to make it the name of her next protagonist.

According to Mochizuki, the manga's main story is Vanitas' possession of a grimmore that is capable of saving cursed vampires. Mochizuki wanted to explore the themes of identities, which a person can lose and recover. Anime News Network said the meaning of the character's name implies there is a double meaning to his personality as seen both by the reader and Noé; Mochizuki said Vanitas is a person who hates himself. From the start, Vanitas had to inspire a feeling of freedom and eccentricity, and acts upon his ideas. This allowed Mochizuki to balance Vanitas with Noé, who is purer and kinder, and has a strong sense of justice and responsibility. As a result, both are complementary. Initially, the concept of Vanitas as a vampire savior was already established but Mochizuki had to think about how to depict him healing vampires in the story. Making Vanitas perform medical procedures did not interest her and she does not think her readers would have liked it. Mochizuki thought about something more conceptual, which is where the idea of using this real-name story came to her. According to Mochizuki, Vanitas is frustrated by Noé's naivety but admires his honesty and innocence. Mochizuki regards Vanitas to be an eccentric and believes Vanitas is popular is because readers also have a certain interior.

=== Casting ===
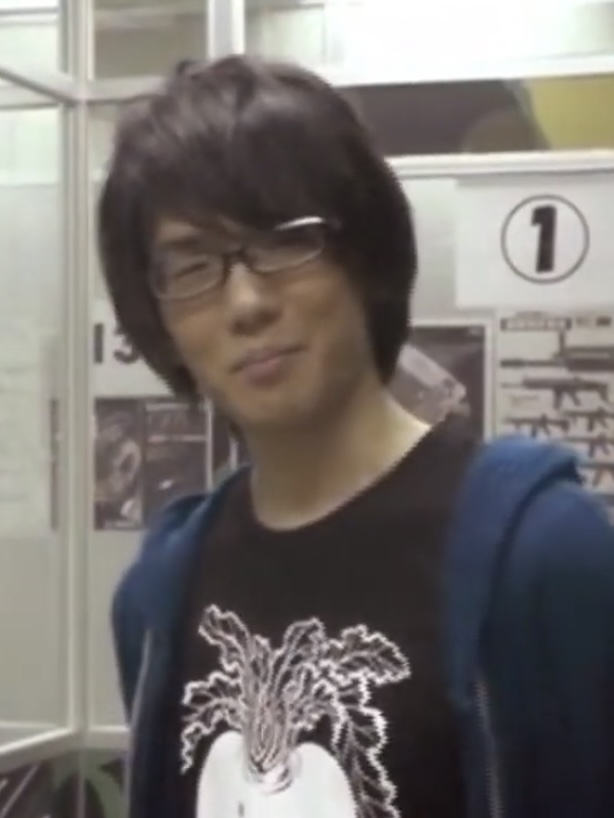
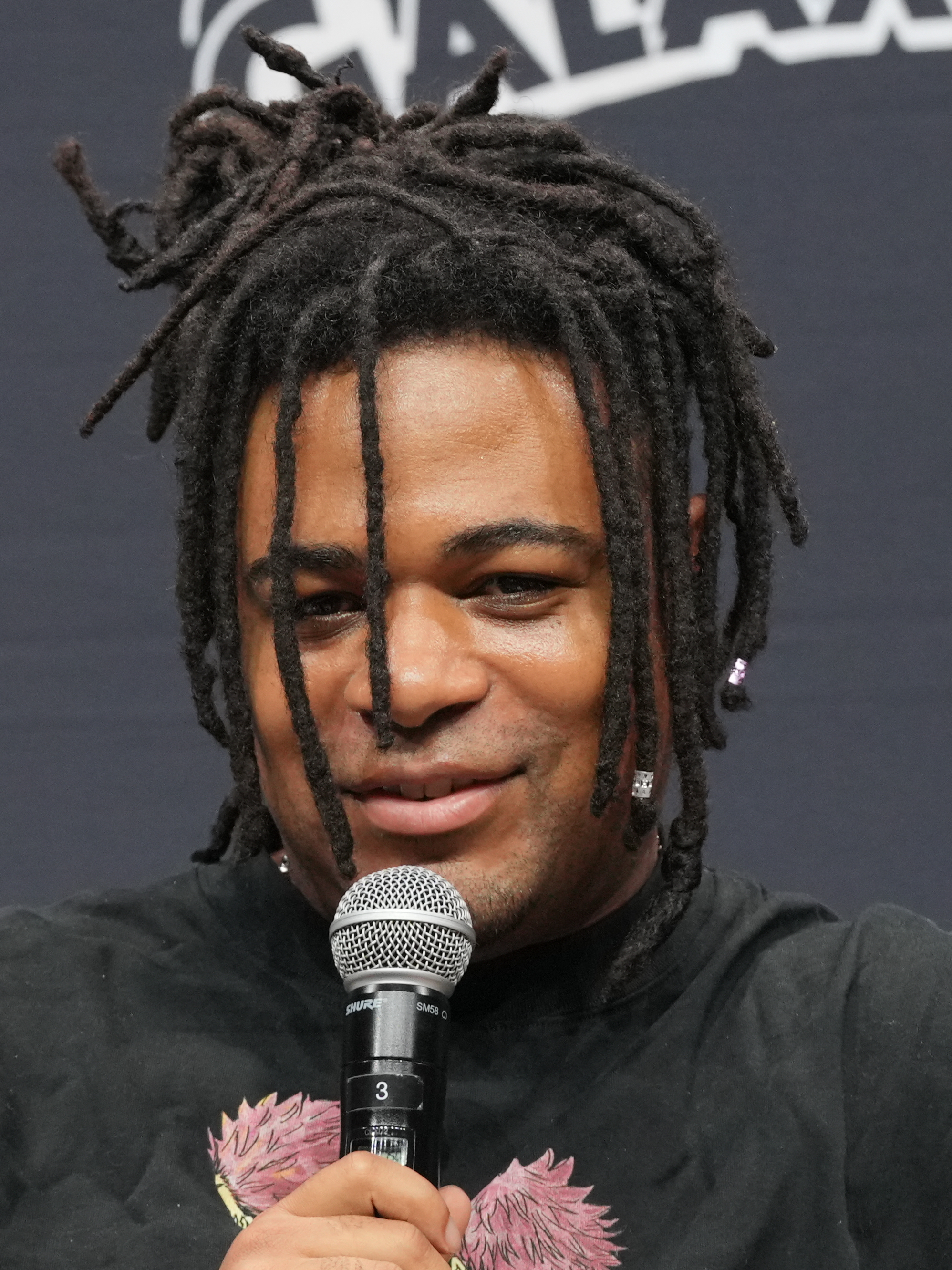
Natsuki Hanae (left) voices Vanitas in Japanese while Zeno Robinson (right) voices the character in English.

In the anime adaptation, Vanitas is voiced by Natsuki Hanae. Both Hanae's play and Kaito Ishikawa's (Noé) plays were noted to complement each other when interacting. Hanae tried to make full use of all the cool, uncool, and sexy parts to bring out the charm of Vanitas. Hanae was cast as Vanitas for his acting experience and the sex appeal he brought to the character. Sex appeal was emphasized in scenes in which Noé takes Dominique's blood and Jeanne takes Vanitas' blood, even though the characters are clothed. When first seeing Vanitas, Hanae got the impression he is a cheeky character but when he performed the part based on his behavioral philosophy, there were many pure and cute parts. Because the character makes the audience feel kindness and melancholy, the actor consciously faced dubbing so he could show that as well. The actor noted Vanitas is an uncommon character based on his behavior. Director Tomoyuki Itamura told him despite the character's personality, Vanitas is not a villain.

According to Hanae, In the first place, Vanitas is a character with many different facial expressions, so I thought it would be a waste not to express him in a variety of ways. When he talked with the director about various things, he thought that the best way to act would be if he spoke like he was singing, so that is what he decided to do. For the second half, Hanae commented that Vanitas' true feelings are being shown more often.

Mochizuki said Hanae makes Vanitas feel like a hateful character but is appropriate for his age. Zeno Robinson voices Vanitas in the English dub, while Cherami Leigh plays the character's younger self. Robinson said it was difficult to play Vanitas as a result of finding the comical style with which the casting director often talked to him, something he had never done before.

== Appearances ==
=== The Case Study of Vanitas ===
Vanitas is the protagonist of the manga The Case Study of Vanitas as he invades an airship that is en route Paris in order to heal the cursed vampire Amelia Ruth with his grimoire, The Book of Vanitas. On board the airship, Vanitas meets the vampire Noé Archiviste, who becomes fascinated by the book and become partners. In a mission, Vanitas takes interest in the Hellfire Witch Jeanne, whom Vanitas declares his unconditional love after kissing her. When Vanitas chases Noé into the vampires' dimension, he again meets Jeanne and persuades her to drink his blood, believing she has problems with a curse. However, Vanitas claims he has no interest Jeanne and just wanna toy with her. In another mission, Vanitas reveals that when he was trained to be a Chasseur following his father's death, he became a test subject of Doctor Moreau until being taken by the original Blue Moon vampire Vanitas.

On a mission to Gévaudan to take down an apparent vampire, the cursed Beast, Vanitas is wounded by paladin Astolfo Granatum. Jeanne forces Vanitas to nurse him, which allows the doctor to learn the beast is her childhood friend Chloé d'Apchier. Vanitas realizes Chloé plans to kill herself and teams up with Jeanne to stop Chloé's curse and suicide. Shortly afterwards, Vanitas realizes he has fallen in love with Jeanne, but is bothered by it, claiming he hates himself.

Vanitas' adoptive brother Mikhail forces Noé to see how Vanitas lived with the original Vanitas from the Blue Moon and suffered from severe grief because Vanitas blamed himself for the death of his mother during labor. The experiments heavily damaged Vanitas' body who refused his guardian's idea to make him stronger as a vampire. When Vanitas finds Mikhail, he tries to kill him but is opposed by Noé because his friend Dominique de Sade is being held hostage. Vanitas eventually gives up and Jeanne saves the duo. Vanitas tells Mikhail he killed their father because he was cursed by an unknown vampire and Vanitas became a doctor to vampires as a means of revenge. He then apologizes to Noé and they become friends.

=== Other appearances ===
Vanitas has also appeared in an audio drama as Vanitas Suzuki, a cross-dressing high-school student who meets Jeanne on his first day of school. Jeanne becomes obsessed with Vanitas' appearance and blood, and confesses her unconditional love to him, much to his shock. At school, Vanitas meets his teacher Noé, who wishes to introduce him to the establishment but is instead chased by Jeanne. In the aftermath, Jeanne realizes Suzuki is a man but still professes her love for him. Vanitas breaks the fourth wall by claiming this story should not continue. Vanitas has also appeared in a stage play, in which he was portrayed by Keisuke Ueda in January 2021.

== Reception ==
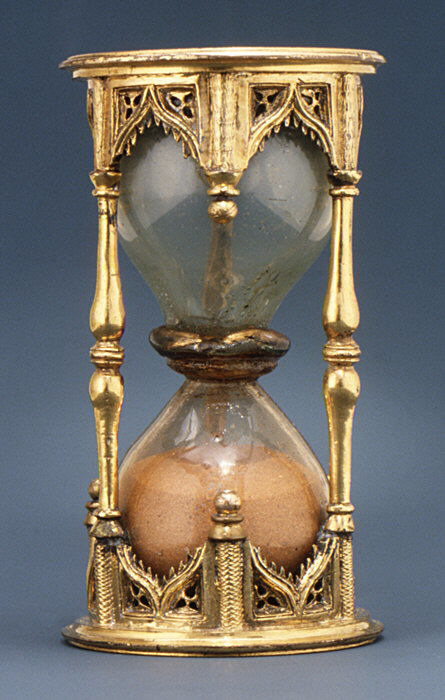
Among the multiple parts from Vanitas' design, there is an emphasis on hourglass-like earring which reflects the character's limited lifespan and how he is trying to accept the death of his relatives too.

Critics' initial response to Vanitas was favorable. The Fandom Post praised his heroic personality, while Manga News and El Palomitrón found his characterization good and comical. The Fandom Post found the early fight scenes of the series the most appealing parts because of Vanitas' unpredictability, especially when dealing with Jeanne. Bleeding Cool noted while Noé appears to have more respect from the cast, Vanitas prefers the idea of being a loner who is hated by society. Bleeding Cool found the season's climax depicting Vanitas' true past tragic and powerful because it affects the relationship between the two protagonists, who initially fight until Vanitas finds himself unable to kill Noé. Anime Feminist called the character "peak trash" while other reviewers enjoyed his dynamic with Noé. Bleeding Cool said Vanitas' personality is one of the most-entertaining parts of the series because while he constantly smirking or laughing, it is obviously a facade behind which he hiding something from his past, comparing him with Fullmetal Alchemist protagonist Edward Elric and also enjoying his relationship with Noé. In another parallel with Fullmetal Alchemist, Comic Book Resources noticed Vanitas is seen disturbed for the first time in the narrative when failing to save a vampire from a curse in a similar pattern to Edward becoming shocked with the transformation of Nina Tucker and her dog into a chimera. Anime News Network said the revelation of Vanitas' connection with Doctor Moreau makes the character more vulnerable than anticipated; when meeting his torturer again, Vanitas' personality drastically changes, giving him survivor's guilt and relying far more on Noé. Manga News praised the handling of Vanitas through his tragic backstory and his apparently fated duel with Noé.

Several reviewers focused on Vanitas' relationship with the vampire Jeanne. Vanitas forcing a kiss with her was criticized as being inappropriate as comedy. The Fandom Post found the delivery in the anime entertaining. The focus on romance between arcs was praised for its handling of Vanitas as a hilarious character, considering how poorly he reacts to his feelings towards Jeanne, making them a believable couple. El Palomitrón said while there is no boys' love between the two leads due to the focus on other, more explored relationships, the reviewer found the connection between Vanitas and Noé deep and comparable to the one between Vanitas and Jeanne. Caitlin Moore from Anime News Network listed the handling of vampirism between Jeanne and Vanitas, and between Dominique and Noé, as the best moment in anime that year due to the amount of sex appeal the characters portray.

The character of Vanitas was popular in Anitrendz; Vanitas and Jeanne were nominated in the couple category. Anime Feminist enjoyed Natsuki Hanae's work, calling his characterization enjoyable and said he gives hidden depths to a difficult past. Anime Trending was more critical of Hanae's work for leaving Vanitas' true personality "static" in favor of supporting characters, who are explored more in the first half of the anime. Vanitas' French actor Brieuc Lemaire was also a nominee for the 6th Crunchyroll Anime Awards.

Vanitas wears an earring that looks like an hourglass. Upon first seeing it, writer Deko Akao believed the earring has a history, which was confirmed upon further seeing Vanitas' past depicted in the manga. Anime News Network stated the earring reflects Vanitas' mortality and short lifespan, which the reviewer inferred as the message the author wanted to portray.

Artur Lozano Mendez from Autonomous University of Barcelona referred to Vanitas and Noah from as yasaotoko archetypes, with the former standing out as a technical hero with healing abilities not commonly seen in the male demography in contrast to the latter who comes across a weaker type of hero. He noted that Vanitas stands out as a protagonist for the way he interacts with other female characters. While Vanitas at first is portrayed as they started to form a relationship by stealing Jeanne's kiss, in the next scenes it is Jeanne who becomes more active in growing relationship comparable to those of shojo manga instead despite the actual male oriented demography. Despite Vanitas toying with Jeanne, it was noted that Vanitas eventually cared for her.
