= Orlok (disambiguation) =

Count Orlok is a fictional character in the film Nosferatu

Orlok may also refer to:

- Orlok the Assassin, a fictional character in the comic strip Judge Dredd
- Byron Orlok, a fictional character in the film Targets
- Parks Orlok, a fictional character in the manga series The Case Study of Vanitas

== See also ==
- "The Beast of Orlok", an audio play in the audio play series The Eighth Doctor Adventures
- Graf Orlok, an American hardcore punk band
- Kho Orluk (1580–1644), Mongol taishi
