= DBO =

DBO may refer to:

- Database owner (SQL), which can refer to either the physical owner, a user role, or a schema
- Dragon Ball Online
- Daulat Beg Oldi
- DBO Energy, an independent Brazilian Oil & Gas company, focused on mature, producing fields
- DB Oil Fund, run by Invesco PowerShares
- Dual badge officer
- Dubbo Regional Airport
- Dead Blackout (Theatre Lighting)
- The unit dBO, decibels below overload
- Design, build and operate, a type of contract for project delivery and operation
