= Dragon Ball Z: Bardock – The Father of Goku =

1990 Japanese TV special

- Region 1 VHS Cover

ドラゴンボールゼット たったひとりの最終決戦〜フリーザに挑んだゼット戦士 孫悟空の父〜 (Doragon Bōru Zetto Tatta Hitori no Saishū Kessen ~Furīza ni Idonda Zetto Senshi Son Gokū no Chichi~)
- Genre: Action
- Created by: Akira Toriyama
- Anime television film
- Directed by: Mitsuo Hashimoto
- Written by: Takao Koyama; Katsuyuki Sumisawa
- Music by: Shunsuke Kikuchi
- Studio: Toei Animation
- Licensed by: NA: Crunchyroll LLC
- Original network: FNS (Fuji TV)
- Released: October 17, 1990
- Runtime: 48 minutes

Dragon Ball Z: Bardock – The Father of Goku (Note: Known in Japan as Dragon Ball Z: A Final, Solitary Battle: The Father of a Z-Warrior Son Gokū, Who Challenged Freeza (Japanese: ドラゴンボールゼット たったひとりの最終決戦〜フリーザに挑んだゼット戦士 孫悟空の父〜, Hepburn: Doragon Bōru Zetto Tatta Hitori no Saishū Kessen ~Furīza ni Idonda Zetto Senshi Son Gokū no Chichi~) (also titled Dragon Ball Z: The Father of Goku by AB Groupe)) is the first television special of the Dragon Ball Z anime series, which is based on the Dragon Ball manga by Akira Toriyama. It was broadcast on Fuji Television on October 17, 1990, in-between episodes 63 and 64. Serving as a prequel to the entire series, the special takes place twelve years before the events of Dragon Ball, and depicts the final days of the Saiyan planet Vegeta before its destruction at the hands of Frieza, told from the perspective of Goku's biological father Bardock, who attempts to avert this from happening and save his race from genocide.

The special inspired a sequel manga called Dragon Ball: Episode of Bardock, which would be published in 2011 and adapted into a short film later that year.

== Plot ==
Shugesh, Bardock, Borgos, Tora and Fasha

Bardock, a low-level Saiyan soldier and his crew are on an assignment to slaughter the inhabitants of Planet Kanassa. They manage to accomplish this by using the planet's full moon to transform into Great Apes. The next morning, Bardock and his crew rest and celebrate their victory until one surviving Kanassan warrior catches him off-guard and decides to give him the "gift" of seeing the future as his way to avenge his people, before being killed by Bardock who subsequently passes out. Bardock returns to Planet Vegeta to heal and visits his infant son, Kakarot, who is being prepared to be sent to Earth in order to exterminate all life there. Bardock starts to have visions of Kakarot fighting future foes, as well as Planet Vegeta's destruction at the hands of Frieza, the emperor of the Universe and overseer of the Saiyans. Bardock dismisses the visions and goes to join his team on Planet Meat, only to discover most of them dead, and his best friend Tora mortally wounded. Before he succumbs to his injuries, Tora reveals that Bardock's squad was betrayed and killed by Frieza's henchman Dodoria and his elite soldiers, and that Frieza ordered the attack on the crew due to him becoming paranoid about the growing power of the Saiyans. Horrified and enraged by his fallen friend's last words, he then battles Dodoria's soldiers and defeats them all, only to be easily overwhelmed by a single mouth blast from Dodoria. He is left severely injured, but manages to return to Planet Vegeta.

Now realizing that Frieza intends to destroy the entire Saiyan race, Bardock attempts to convince the other Saiyans of the danger that they are all in, but his claims are laughed off and ignored. Bardock thus begins a final one-man assault against Frieza and his men. After fighting his way through Frieza's soldiers, Bardock sends a large energy blast at the tyrant himself. However, Frieza counters by launching his deadly Supernova attack which consumes Bardock and many of his own soldiers, and destroys Planet Vegeta. As he perishes, Bardock has one final vision of the future: Kakarot facing off against Frieza. Assured that Kakarot will be the one to defeat Frieza, Bardock smiles as he along with Planet Vegeta are engulfed by the energy bomb. After his demise, Bardock telepathically wishes Kakarot to carry out his will and avenge his people and their home planet, also stating his one regret of not holding his child when he still had the chance. At the same moment, Kakarot, who is hurtling toward Earth in his space pod, wakes up. Elsewhere, having just completed an assignment on a faraway world, Vegeta, the Saiyan Prince, is informed by his colleague Nappa of his homeworld's destruction, and that Frieza claims that the planet was destroyed by a meteor, but Vegeta is outwardly indifferent. Soon afterwards, Kakarot's space pod touches down on Earth, where he is found by an elderly man, Gohan and giggles happily in the old man's arms. Gohan then decides to adopt the boy as his own grandson, and gives him a new name – Goku.

During the ending credits, Goku's battles against the Red Ribbon Army, Tien Shinhan, King Piccolo, Piccolo, Nappa and Vegeta are shown, culminating with an image of Goku about to battle Frieza, with the spirits of Bardock and his team watching.

== Cast ==
Character name	Voice actor		
Character name	Japanese	English	
Character name	Japanese	Funimation (2000 - original/2008 - remastered)	Chinkel-Post Production/AB Groupe (c. 2003)
Bardock	Masako Nozawa	Sonny Strait	David Gasman
Goku/Kakarot	Masako Nozawa	Stephanie Nadolny (baby); Sean Schemmel (adult)	Jodi Forrest (baby); David Gasman (adult)
Toma (トーマ, Tōma)	Kazuyuki Sogabe	Tora	Doug Rand
Toma (トーマ, Tōma)	Kazuyuki Sogabe	Mike McFarland	Doug Rand
Selypa (セリパ, Seripa)	Yūko Mita	Fasha	Jodi Forrest
Selypa (セリパ, Seripa)	Yūko Mita	Linda Young	Jodi Forrest
Totapo (トテッポ, Toteppo)	Kōzō Shioya	Borgos	Ed Marcus
Totapo (トテッポ, Toteppo)	Kōzō Shioya	Dameon Clarke	Ed Marcus
Pumbukin (パンブーキン, Panbūkin)	Takeshi Watabe	Shugesh	Ed Marcus
Pumbukin (パンブーキン, Panbūkin)	Takeshi Watabe	Chris Rager	Ed Marcus
Frieza	Ryūsei Nakao	Linda Young	Ed Marcus
Dodoria	Yukitoshi Hori	Chris Forbis	Ed Marcus
Zarbon	Shō Hayami	Christopher Sabat	Doug Rand
Prince Vegeta	Ryō Horikawa	Christopher Sabat	Sharon Mann
Nappa	Shozo Iizuka	Christopher Sabat (original); Phil Parsons (re-dub)	Paul Bandey; Doug Rand (some lines)
Toolo (トオロ, Tōro)	Banjo Ginga	Kent Williams	Paul Bandey
Horned Gang Leader	Kenji Utsumi	Kyle Hebert	Paul Bandey
Doctor	Jōji Yanami	Planthorr	Paul Bandey
Doctor	Jōji Yanami	Dameon Clarke	Paul Bandey
Doctor's assistant	Kōzō Shioya	Malaka	Doug Rand
Doctor's assistant	Kōzō Shioya	Mark Britten (original); Chris Cason (re-dub)	Doug Rand
Other Saiyans	Hirohiko Kakegawa; Yuji Machi; Chie Satoh; Shinobu Satochi; Michio Nakao	Bart Myer; Mark Britten; Ceyli Delgadillo; Chuck Huber; Kyle Hebert; John Burgmeier; Chris Rager	Ed Marcus; Doug Rand; Paul Bandey
Grandpa Gohan	Kinpei Azusa	Christopher Sabat	Ed Marcus
Narrator	Jōji Yanami	Dale D. Kelly (original); Kyle Hebert (re-dub)	Ed Marcus

== Music ==
- OP (Opening Theme):
  - "CHA-LA HEAD-CHA-LA"
    - Lyrics by Yukinojō Mori
    - Music by Chiho Kiyooka
    - Arranged by Kenji Yamamoto
    - Performed by Hironobu Kageyama
- IN (Insert Song):
  - "Solid State Scouter" (ソリッドステート・スカウター, Soriddosutēto Sukautā)
    - Music and arrangement: Fuminori Iwazaki
    - Voice: TOKIO
    - Instrumentation: Dragon Magic Orchestra
- ED (Ending Theme):
  - Hikari no Tabi (光の旅, "Journey of Light")
    - Lyrics by Dai Satō
    - Music by Chiho Kiyooka
    - Arranged by Kenji Yamamoto
    - Performed by Hironobu Kageyama and KŪKO (Waffle)

The song "Solid State Scouter" by Dragon Magic Orchestra is a homage to the Japanese synthpop band Yellow Magic Orchestra, specifically their 1979 album Solid State Survivor.

=== Funimation dub soundtrack ===
The following songs were present in the Funimation dub of Bardock – The Father of Goku: The remaining pieces of background music were composed by Mark Akin, Andy Baylor and Dale D. Kelly.

1. Saliva – "Superstar"
2. Caviar – "The Good Times Are Over"
3. Sum 41 – "Makes No Difference"
4. American Hi-Fi – "A Bigger Mood"
5. Incubus - Nowhere fast

However, on the Double Feature DVD/Blu-ray sets, there is an alternate audio track containing the English dub with original Japanese background music by Shunsuke Kikuchi.

== Reception ==
=== Critical response ===
Chris Beveridge of Mania.com says that "Bardock getting explored a bit more is definitely a positive, and surely could carry an arc himself if not more in giving us the Saiyan view of things pre-Freeza and though the early part of it."

=== Box office ===
On November 3 and 5, 2018 it had a joint limited theatrical release with a film Dragon Ball Z: Fusion Reborn (1995), titled as Dragon Ball Z: Saiyan Double Feature, by Fathom Events in the United States due to the upcoming release of Dragon Ball Super: Broly (2018). According to Box Office Mojo, as of November 7, the Saiyan Double Feature made a revenue of $540,707.

== Releases ==
It was released on VHS in North America in November 21, 2000, then on DVD in January 2001. They later released the double feature with a first special and The History of Trunks with digitally remastered widescreen format on DVD on February 19, 2008, then on Blu-ray released on July 15, 2008. The first special was re-released to DVD on September 15, 2009, in a remastered-widescreen single-disc edition.
