= Mary Mary (disambiguation) =

Mary Mary is an American gospel music duo.

Mary Mary (Mary, Mary) may also refer to:

== Music ==
- Mary Mary (album), a 2005 album by Mary Mary
- "Mary Mary", a song by Velvet Revolver from its Libertad album
- "Mary, Mary" (song), a 1966 song by The Monkees
- "Mary, Mary", a modified cover of The Monkees song by Run-D.M.C. from its Tougher Than Leather album
- "Mary Mary", a song by Bruce Springsteen from his 2014 EP American Beauty
- “Mary, Mary”, a song by Hi-Five from their 1992 album Keep It Goin' On
- "Mary, Mary", a song by Chumbawamba from its Tubthumper album
- "Mary, Mary, Quite Contrary", a 1744 nursery rhyme
- Mary Byker (born 1963), English singer also known as Mary Mary

== Other media ==
- Mary Mary (TV series), an American reality television series starring the gospel duo Mary Mary
- Mary, Mary (film), a 1963 film directed by Mervyn LeRoy; an adaptation of the 1961 play
- Mary, Mary (novel), a 2006 novel by James Patterson
- Mary, Mary (play), a 1961 play by Jean Kerr
- Sergeant Mary Mary, a character in Jasper Fforde's nursery crimes series, introduced in The Big Over Easy (2005)

== See also ==
- Mary Mary Mary
- Mary (disambiguation)
