= Sakiyomi Jum-Bang! =

Japanese television series

- Genre: Variety show
- Country of origin: Japan
- Original language: Japanese

Original release
- Network: TV Tokyo
- Release: April 3, 2009

Sakiyomi Jum-Bang! (サキよみ ジャンBANG!, Sakiyomi Jan BANG!) is a variety/TV talk show aired on Japan's TV Tokyo network. The series' title is a portmanteau of Jump (ジャンプ, Janpu) and Bang. The first episode was broadcast on April 3, 2009. It features comics from Shueisha's weekly and monthly manga anthologies (Weekly Shōnen Jump, V Jump and Jump Square) and their associated anime and games. It changed to jumpolice in march in 2014.

== Characters ==
- Akina Minami as Akina (アッキーナ), the host of the program.
- Tetsuya Yanagihara as Amepai (アメパイ), one of the Amezari Pirates (アメザリパイレーツ, Amezaripairētsu) also known as America Zarigani (アメリカザリガニ, amerikazarigani)
- Yoshiyuki Hirai as Zarepai (ザリパイ), one of the Amezari Pirates. He has a Toothbrush moustache.
- Captain Book (ブック船長, Bukku senchō), the leader and mascot of the Amezari Pirates. He appears as a parrot with a pirate hat. Captain Book is voiced by Ocady (オキャディー, Okyadi).
- Aki Kanada as the Narrator.
- Mao Ichimichi hosted a segment called Informational Corner which ran from 2010 to 2014
- Hikarigoke (played by Yūsuke Katayama and Kazumasa Kunisawa)

== Main corner ==
=== Hikarigoke Katayama's Corner ===
Rock Lee Exercises!
Katayama practices the Rock Lee exercises shown in Naruto's Rock Lee & His Ninja Pals spin-off. They dance at the opening of this program. There are 3 types of exercises.
Rock Lee Katayama's Super Training Series!
Katayama trains several trainings posted by viewers. After failing many times, new exercises are started from April 6, 2012.

=== Zarigani Pirates' Corner ===
Zarigani Pirates! The Road for Yu-Gi-oh! Card World Battleship!
This segment began when Yu-Gi-Oh! was featured early in the series. When it was aired, the corner primarily showed Zaripai (who was aiming for the Yu-Gi-Oh! World Championship). Due to his poor performance, however, it was ended. After that he produced the elementary school students team named "Zaripai Japan", and it was started again.
Zarigani Pirate's Paper Comic Corner
Zaripai shows his short comics on the paper at the end of the corner when his crewmates get the paper from the writer. The paper can be downloaded from the homepages on the phones.

=== Akina's room ===
Akina Minami and Zarigani pirates talk with guests. It is parody of Tetsuko's Room, so Akina Minami speaks like Tetsuko Kuroyanagi.

=== Teach me, writers! ===
The writers answer the readers' questions. The questions change every month.

== Theme songs ==
- Opening theme: Jump
- Closing theme: Rotates depending on the currently featured anime

== Vomic ==
Vomic is a segment where voice actors lend their voices to characters from popular manga series. The word Vomic is a portmanteau of voice and comic. Some clips are published on the official Vomic website. The series that are featured on the program are rotated monthly.

Month aired	Manga	Chapters Featured
April 2009	Toriko	1 - 4
May 2009	Naruto	2 - 5
June 2009	Bakuman	1 - 4
July 2009	Inumarudashi	1 - 4
August 2009	Beelzebub	1 - 4
September 2009	Tegami Bachi	1
October 2009	Toriko	1
November 2009	Sket Dance	46, 63
December 2009	Nurarihyon no Mago	1
January 2010	Psyren	1
February 2010	Medaka Box	1
March 2010	Kuroko's Basketball	1
April 2010	Gin Tama	Benizakura arc prologue
May 2010	Binbōgami ga!	1
June 2010	Ao no Exorcist	1
July 2010	Medaka Box	26, 27
August 2010	Toriko	
September 2010	Beelzebub	5, 12
October 2010	Sket Dance	66, 102
November 2010	Kakkokawaii Sengen!	Mini animation
December 2010	Katekyō Hitman Reborn!	Inheritance expression
January 2011	Kuroko's Basketball	26 - 28
February 2011	Hokenshitsu no Shinigami	2, 3
March 2011	Gekka Bijin	1
April 2011	Enigma	
May 2011	Karakuri Dôji Ultimo	1, 2
June 2011	Inumarudashi	1 - 4
July 2011	The Prince of After School	
August 2011	Rock Lee & His Ninja Pals	
September 2011	Bleach	The Lost Shinigami Power arc
October 2011	Magico	1
November 2011	Boku to Majo no Jikan	1
December 2011	Henteko Ninja: Imogakure Chingensai-sama	
January 2012	1/11	1
February 2012	Teiichi no Kuni	1
March 2012	Medaka Box	1
April 2012	Golem a Go! Go!	
May 2012	Kurogane	
June 2012	Nisekoi	
July 2012	Naruto	500 - 504
August 2012	Saiki Kusuo no Sainan	
September 2012	Chō Soku Henkei Gyrozetter	
October 2012	Kekkai Sensen	4
November 2012	Haikyū!!	1
December 2012	Gekikara! Curry Ōji	
January 2013	Ansatsu Kyōshitsu	1-4
February 2013	Owari no Seraph	1
March 2013	Saiki Kusuo no Sainan	
April 2013	Gekikara! Curry Ōji	
May 2013	Kono Oto Tomare!	1
June 2013	Ansatsu Kyōshitsu	5-8
July 2013	Shokugeki no Sōma	1-4
August 2013	Owari no Seraph	2
September 2013	Saiki Kusuo no Sainan	
October 2013	Te To Kuchi	1
November 2013	Majin no Gald	1
December 2013	World Trigger	1
January 2014	Jaco the Galactic Patrolman	1, 2
February 2014	Soul catchers	1
March 2014	y -Ganma-	1
