= Jaco the Galactic Patrolman =

Japanese manga series by Akira Toriyama

- Kanzenban volume cover featuring Jaco (left), Omori (center), and Tights (right)

銀河パトロール ジャコ (Ginga Patorōru Jako)
- Genre: Comedy; Science fiction
- Manga
- Written by: Akira Toriyama
- Published by: Shueisha
- English publisher: NA: Viz Media
- Imprint: Jump Comics
- Magazine: Weekly Shōnen Jump
- English magazine: NA: Weekly Shonen Jump
- Original run: July 29, 2013 – October 14, 2013
- Volumes: 1
- icon

Jaco the Galactic Patrolman (Japanese: 銀河パトロール ジャコ, Hepburn: Ginga Patorōru Jako) is a Japanese manga series written and illustrated by Akira Toriyama. It was serialized in Shueisha's shōnen manga magazine Weekly Shōnen Jump from July to October 2013, with the eleven chapters collected into a single volume. It follows Jaco, an extraterrestrial police officer that has come to Earth to protect it from an evil alien attack.

The eleventh chapter reveals that the story is set before the events of Toriyama's Dragon Ball and features some of its characters. Since the series' conclusion, Jaco has become a recurring character in various Dragon Ball media. The first two chapters received a "Vomic" adaptation for the television show Sakiyomi Jum-Bang!. English-language publisher Viz Media serialized Jaco simultaneously in their digital Weekly Shonen Jump as it ran in Japan and released the single volume in North America in 2015.

== Plot ==
Jaco, a Galactic Patrolman sent to Earth to protect it from an evil alien attack, crash lands on Earth. He meets the retired scientist Omori who offers to try and fix his spaceship. The next day, government policeman Katayude informs Omori that he does not have the right to live on the island and has to vacate it in one week or be arrested. Jaco learns that Omori has continued his research on time travel in order to save his deceased wife and assistants, but is only able to temporarily speed up how the user experiences time, giving the illusion of stopped time (not actual time travel according to Jaco, which is against intergalactic law). Omori repairs the spaceship, but deduces that it needs a very expensive metal as fuel.

During a trip to the capital for supplies, Jaco saves a young woman from thugs, but also unknowingly attacks the police, becoming a wanted man. The woman, Tights, decides to join Jaco and Omori on the island and buys a small amount of the expensive metal with the money she was given for agreeing to act as a body double for a pop star in an upcoming dangerous rocket launch publicity stunt. Although not enough to make the trip home, it will allow Jaco to call for help. However, he breaks the ship's radio antennae while showing off.

Katayude sees a news report on Jaco's crime in the capital and realizes he saw the suspect on Omori's island. He arrives with a team the next day to arrest Jaco. During the confrontation, the rocket holding Tights malfunctions and starts falling to Earth. After quickly subduing the government police, Jaco and Omori use Omori's incomplete time machine to give themselves enough time to save Tights. In thanks for preventing a catastrophe, Katayude not only promises to keep Jaco's whereabouts secret, but also allows Omori to stay on the island.

On the day the invading evil alien is supposed to land, Jaco does not see the ship land thanks to Tights and so comes to the conclusion that the Earth is saved. However, the alien did in fact land and is taken in by Son Gohan who gives him the name Son Goku. Thinking to use parts of the ship in order to make the money needed for fuel, the trio call over Tights' father who happens to be Dr. Briefs, a scientific genius and richest man in the world. But it is his younger daughter, Bulma, who fixes the antennae and informs everyone that the expensive metal is not the ship's power source but is only used to store energy, while the similar and much cheaper copper would do the same job. Jaco returns home and Omori buys the island with money from Dr. Briefs. Years later, Katayude has moved to the island as well, Tights has become a science fiction writer, Jaco has found a girlfriend and occasionally visits, and Bulma stops by, having just started out on a journey to gather seven wish-granting balls.

== Characters ==
Jaco Teirimentenpibosshi (ジャコ・ティリメンテンピボッシ, Jako Tirimentenpibosshi)
Voiced by: Tsubasa Yonaga (Vomic), Natsuki Hanae (Dragon Ball Z: Resurrection 'F' / Dragon Ball Super) (Japanese); Todd Haberkorn (English)
An alien Galactic Patrolman with a strong sense of justice.
Tokunoshin Omori (大盛 徳之進, Ōmori Tokunoshin)
Voiced by: Issei Futamata (Vomic)
A people-hating theoretical physicist that lives alone on the island a former government laboratory was on. Prior to the start of the series, he worked at the secret laboratory trying to invent a time machine. However, it was abandoned after an accident resulted in many deaths, including that of his wife.
Tights (タイツ, Taitsu)
Voiced by: Hiromi Tsuru (Dragon Ball Super) (Japanese); Anastasia Muñoz (English)
A seventeen-year-old girl who befriends Jaco and Omori and aspires to be a science fiction writer. She is the body double that will be sent into space in place of An Azuki. She graduated from university at age sixteen and is Bulma's older sister.
Tamagoro Katayude (固茹 玉五郎, Katayude Tamagoro)
Voiced by: Takuya Satō (Vomic)
Chief of the Government Sea Police sent to have Omori vacate the island so it can be turned into a resort.
An Azuki (亜月 アン)
Voiced by: Sachie Hirai (Vomic)
A sixteen-year-old idol being sent into space on the rocket "Twinkle 8" (キラキラ8号), where she will sing while orbiting the Earth twice.

== Production ==
Jaco the Galactic Patrolman is Akira Toriyama's first serial in 13 years, following Sand Land in 2000. He provided insight on its creation in digital content for Weekly Shōnen Jump's Jump Live! mobile app. He revealed that he began planning the manga a year earlier and that it was originally set to be serialized during the release of Dragon Ball Z: Battle of Gods, but working on two hours of sleep a night exhausted him and he fell four months behind.

The author drew everything on a computer, and for the first time created storyboards separate from rough drafts. He first created a storyboard that he sent to his editor for approval. Once approved, he used the storyboard as a base to draw a rough draft, which was then digitally "inked" with adjustments to the image if necessary. Prior to Jaco he would use his storyboard as the rough draft so as to only have to draw a chapter twice instead of three times. His editor finished the lettering and he occasionally had someone else do the series' logo. Additionally, Toriyama stated this would probably be the last manga he will provide the pictures for by himself.

He noted that Jaco the Galactic Patrolman was being simultaneously released overseas and said that while foreign fans were probably expecting an action series like Dragon Ball, Jaco is simple and they might have trouble understanding Japanese elements. Toriyama called the manga a "goofy and fun story of friendship" and named it his favorite story and main character that he has created.

== Release ==
Written and illustrated by Akira Toriyama, Jaco the Galactic Patrolman was serialized in Shueisha's shōnen manga magazine Weekly Shōnen Jump from July 29 to October 14, 2013, in celebration of the magazine's 45th anniversary. The eleven chapters were collected into one tankōbon and one larger kanzenban that were released on April 4, 2014, by Shueisha. Both versions contain a bonus story focusing on Dragon Ball that unveils Goku's mother, while the kanzenban alone includes a postcard, a key ring and a Galactic Patrol badge. The series was released digitally on July 4, 2014.

Viz Media began serializing Jaco the Galactic Patrolman in English in their digital Weekly Shonen Jump magazine just two days after its debut in Japan. The magazine published the bonus Dragon Ball story in its May 7, 2014, issue. Viz released the collected volume in North America on January 6, 2015.

=== Chapter list ===
No.	Original release date	Original ISBN	English release date	English ISBN
01	April 4, 2014	978-4-08-870892-8 (tankōbon); 978-4-08-908204-1 (kanzenban)	January 6, 2015	978-1-4215-6630-6
Chapter 1: "The Galactic Patrolman Goes to Earth" (銀河パトロール地球へ, Ginga Patorōru Chikyū e); Chapter 2: "The Galactic Patrolman's Discovery" (銀河パトロールの発見, Ginga Patorōru no Hakken); Chapter 3: "The Galactic Patrolman's Spaceship" (銀河パトロールの宇宙船, Ginga Patorōru no Uchūsen); Chapter 4: "The Galactic Patrolman Goes to the Capital" (銀河パトロール都に行く, Ginga Patorōru Miyako ni Iku); Chapter 5: "The Galactic Patrolman's Enforcement" (銀河パトロールの制裁, Ginga Patorōru no Seisai); Chapter 6: "The Galactic Patrolman and Tights" (銀河パトロールとタイツ, Ginga Patorōru to Taitsu); Chapter 7: "The Galactic Patrolman's Failure" (銀河パトロールの失敗, Ginga Patorōru no Shippai); Chapter 8: "The Galactic Patrolman is Deeply Touched" (銀河パトロール感激, Ginga Patorōru Kangeki); Chapter 9: "The Galactic Patrolman on the Move" (銀河パトロール発進, Ginga Patorōru Hasshin); Chapter 10: "The Galactic Patrolman's Glory" (銀河パトロールの栄光, Ginga Patorōru no Eikō); Chapter +1: "The Galactic Patrolman: Mission Accomplished!" (銀河パトロール任務完了, Ginga Patorōru Ninmu Kanryō); Special Bonus Story: "Dragon Ball −(Minus): The Departure of the Fated Child" (DRAGON BALL －（マイナス）放たれた運命の子供, Doragon Bōru −(Mainasu): Hanatareta Unmei no Kodomo)
The Special Bonus Story takes place just before Jaco the Galactic Patrolman. All Saiyans, including Burdock, are ordered to return to Planet Vegeta by Freeza. Freeza has, unknowing to them, decided to wipe out all Saiyans and their planet in fear of a Super Saiyan and Super Saiyan God. Having an ominous feeling, Burdock convinces Gine to secretly send their son Kakarrot to Earth. Having detected the ship, the Galactic King sends Jaco to investigate Earth before it lands to determine whether or not it is worth saving from the Saiyans.

== Other media ==
External videos
- Promotional video for the series.
- Promotional video for Jaco the Galactic Patrolman and Dragon Ball featuring Masako Nozawa as Son Goku.

In January 2014, the first two chapters of Jaco the Galactic Patrolman received a four-part "Vomic" adaptation for the television show Sakiyomi Jum-Bang!. The segment has voice actors act over a manga series as the pages are shown on screen.

That same year, Jaco and Tights made a cameo appearance in the eleventh chapter of Dragon Ball Heroes: Victory Mission, a Dragon Ball spin-off manga drawn for V Jump by Toyotarou.

A code to download Jaco as a playable character in the 2015 Dragon Ball Xenoverse was included as a pre-order bonus for the Japanese version of the game, and as downloadable content with a monetary fee for international versions. Jaco returns as a playable character in the sequel Dragon Ball Xenoverse 2 and is among the few characters that is playable from the start. Additionally both Jaco and Tights appear in Dragon Ball Fusions, though Tights appears as an NPC while Jaco is an unlockable playable character, though Tights outfit can be unlocked by completing a Sub-Event involving her.

Jaco appears in the 2015 theatrical anime film Dragon Ball Z: Resurrection 'F'. He becomes a recurring character in Dragon Ball Super, where Tights also makes a brief appearance. The story of Dragon Ball Minus was adapted into part of the 2018 film Dragon Ball Super: Broly.

== Reception ==
In its debut week of March 31 – April 6, 2014, Oricon reported that the regular tankōbon volume of Jaco the Galactic Patrolman sold 30,802 copies while the kanzenban edition sold 47,482. The kanzenban sold an additional 31,370 in its second week. A total of 79,985 copies of the regular edition were sold by its fifth week, before the series fell off the Oricon chart.

Rebecca Silverman of Anime News Network gave Jaco the Galactic Patrolman an overall B rating, believing that despite a slow start it gets better as it goes on. While the plot is simple, she believes it provides "interesting commentary" on idol worship in Japanese pop culture. She said that while it is a must-have for Dragon Ball fans, "when one of the masters of shounen manga puts his story in motion" there is something for everyone to enjoy. Otaku USA's Joseph Luster called Jaco a light and fun standalone manga with the "special type of humor and joy that only Toriyama can muster." He stated that the series has well-defined characters and well-timed visual gags and wordplay.
