= Dragon Ball Z: The History of Trunks =

1993 Japanese TV special

- Region 1 VHS Cover

ドラゴンボールZ(ゼット) 絶望への反抗!!残された超戦士・悟飯とトランクス (Doragon Bōru Zetto Zetsubō e no Hankō!! Nokosareta Chō-Senshi • Gohan to Torankusu)
- Created by: Akira Toriyama
- Anime television film
- Directed by: Yoshihiro Ueda
- Written by: Hiroshi Toda
- Music by: Shunsuke Kikuchi
- Studio: Toei Animation
- Licensed by: Crunchyroll
- Original network: FNS (Fuji TV)
- English network: US: Cartoon Network (Toonami)
- Released: February 24, 1993
- Runtime: 48 minutes

Dragon Ball Z: The History of Trunks (Note: Known in Japan as Dragon Ball Z: Defiance in the Face of Despair!! The Remaining Super-Warriors: Gohan and Trunks (Japanese: ドラゴンボールZ(ゼット) 絶望への反抗!!残された超戦士・悟飯とトランクス, Hepburn: Doragon Bōru Zetto Zetsubō e no Hankō!! Nokosareta Chō-Senshi • Gohan to Torankusu)) is a TV special anime based on Akira Toriyama's Dragon Ball manga series. Originally airing in Japan on February 24, 1993, between episodes 175 and 176, the special is based on an extra chapter of the manga series. It depicts the original post-apocalyptic future in which Goku has died from a heart virus and a teenage Trunks, under the tutelage of Goku's son Gohan, tries to defeat the Androids 17 and 18 (native name:人造人間), a pair of biologically-enhanced humans who were originally programmed by Dr. Gero to murder Goku and his allies and who now continue to terrorize the human race and the Earth. A Funimation Productions-produced English dub of the special was aired on Cartoon Network's Toonami block on September 12, 2003.

== Plot ==
In an original timeline, Goku succumbs to a viral heart disease. Goku's death, being the result of natural causes, means that he can no longer be revived for the second time with the Dragon Balls. Six months later, Piccolo, Vegeta, Krillin, Tien Shinhan, Yamcha, and Chiaotzu are killed by Android 17 and Android 18. With the death of Piccolo, Earth's guardian Kami dies as well and the Dragon Balls are permanently rendered unusable, making it impossible for anyone to be revived.

Thirteen years later, most of humanity has been killed by the Androids who routinely terrorize the planet, while Gohan, Goku's son and the sole survivor of the battle, repeatedly fails to defeat them despite having achieved the Super Saiyan transformation. He decides to train a purple-haired boy named Trunks, the teenaged son of Vegeta and Bulma, who struggles to become a Super Saiyan. The two confront the Androids terrorizing an amusement park, only to be brutally defeated. Gohan loses his arm in the battle, and uses the last remaining Senzu bean to heal Trunks. After recovering from his injuries, Gohan continues to train Trunks. Soon afterwards, the Androids attack another city. Trunks begs Gohan to join him, but Gohan pretends to let the former come with him before he knocks out Trunks, fearing that the Earth won't have anybody left to defend it if both he and Trunks die in battle. Gohan challenges the Androids alone, but Gohan's lack of an arm and the Androids' superior stamina puts the former at a severe disadvantage, and he is eventually killed. Alerted by Gohan's ki signal disappearing, Trunks awakens and heads into the city only to find Gohan's corpse lying in the ground. Trunks screams in despair and rage, finally becoming a Super Saiyan in the process.

Three years pass and against Bulma's warnings, Trunks fights the Androids by himself. Despite becoming a Super Saiyan, he is no match for the Androids and is swiftly defeated and almost killed. After recovering from his injuries, Trunks uses Bulma's newly-made time machine to travel twenty years to the past and give Goku the cure for his heart virus, hoping to discover something in the past that will help them defeat the Androids when he returns.

== Cast ==
Character name	Voice actor		
Character name	Japanese	English	
Character name	Japanese	Funimation (2000 - original/2008 - remastered)	Chinkel Post-Production/AB Groupe (c. 2003)
Trunks	Takeshi Kusao (teen); Hiromi Tsuru (baby)	Eric Vale (teen); Stephanie Nadolny (baby)	Doug Rand (teen); Jodi Forrest (baby)
Gohan	Masako Nozawa	Dameon Clarke (adult); Stephanie Nadolny (child)	David Gasman (adult); Jodi Forrest (child)
Android 17	Shigeru Nakahara	Chuck Huber	Doug Rand
Android 18	Miki Itō	Meredith McCoy	Sharon Mann
Bulma	Hiromi Tsuru	Tiffany Vollmer	Bloomer
Bulma	Hiromi Tsuru	Tiffany Vollmer	Sharon Mann
Ox-King	Daisuke Gōri	Mark Britten (original); Kyle Hebert (re-dub)	Paul Bandey
Chi-Chi	Naoko Watanabe	Cynthia Cranz	Sharon Mann
Krillin	Mayumi Tanaka	Sonny Strait	Clearin
Krillin	Mayumi Tanaka	Sonny Strait	Sharon Mann
Vegeta	Ryō Horikawa	Christopher Sabat	Doug Rand
Piccolo	Toshio Furukawa	Christopher Sabat	Big Green
Piccolo	Toshio Furukawa	Christopher Sabat	Ed Marcus
Tenshinhan	Hirotaka Suzuoki	Tien Shinhan	Tenshin
Tenshinhan	Hirotaka Suzuoki	John Burgmeier	Sharon Mann
Yamcha	Tōru Furuya	Christopher Sabat	Doug Rand
Kame Sennin	Kōhei Miyauchi	Master Roshi	Ed Marcus
Kame Sennin	Kōhei Miyauchi	Mike McFarland	Ed Marcus
Puar	Naoko Watanabe	Monika Antonelli	Jodi Forrest
Oolong	Naoki Tatsuta	Brad M. Jackson	David Gasman
Turtle	Daisuke Gōri	Christopher Sabat	Ed Marcus
Announcer	Shinobu Satouchi	Justin Cook	David Gasman
Shopkeeper	Shinichiro Ohta	Sean Schemmel	David Gasman
Clerk	Kazunari Tanaka	Sean Schemmel	David Gasman
Woman	Naomi Nagasawa	Stephanie Nadolny	Sharon Mann
Narrator	Jōji Yanami	Dale D. Kelly (original); Kyle Hebert (re-dub)	Ed Marcus

=== Notes ===
- Goku is listed in the credits of this special, despite not having any lines.

== Music ==
=== Funimation soundtrack ===
The following songs were present in the English version of Dragon Ball Z: The History of Trunks, as well as its accompanying soundtrack CD, with exception to most of Dream Theater's music, "Home" being the only track showcased in the soundtrack from them and "Prelude" by Slaughter. The soundtrack also contained remixes or covers of other songs.

1. Bootsy Collins with Buckethead - Shackler
2. Neck Down - Garden of Grace
3. Triprocket - Immigrant Song (Led Zeppelin cover)
4. Dream Theater - Regression
5. Dream Theater - Overture 1928
6. Dream Theater - Fatal Tragedy
7. Dream Theater - Through Her Eyes
8. Dream Theater - Home
9. Dream Theater - The Dance of Eternity
10. Dream Theater - Beyond This Life
11. Slaughter - Prelude
12. Slaughter - Unknown Destination

However, the TV special on Double Feature, there is an alternate audio track containing the English dub with original Japanese background music by Shunsuke Kikuchi.

== Reception ==
Anime News Network's reviewer Chris Shepard stated: "It is interesting... Gohan and Trunks are both understandable characters who I was really able to get into and sympathize for during their battles" but also felt a "good understanding of the happenings of the TV series is recommended". He also felt that the action sequences were exceptional and did not "overdo themselves". He expressed some disappointment in the English dub as the storyline sounded "completely alien" to the Japanese subtitles. For his final grade he noted "[the] Dub doesn't contain the original music... [it] isn't true to the original" but was pleased overall.

John Sinnott of DVDTalk praised the television special, seeing it as being separate from the other episodes of Dragon Ball. He believed this to be a positive attribute. Regarding the Blu-ray release of the film he was less impressed with the color and aspect ratio, citing them as not particularly "exciting". However, he expressed joy at Funimation leaving the original Japanese soundtrack and the English voice dubs in, describing them as "enveloping". For fans of Dragon Ball he recommended watching the episode as it "worked a lot better than the average theatrical film since they follow DBZ continuity and expand the story while filling in details". Like Shepard the Sinnott review advised those who are not familiar to the Dragon Ball franchise to avoid the episode but that fans will enjoy it. In conclusion he felt the film was enjoyable at best.

== Releases ==
It was released on DVD and VHS in North America on October 24, 2000. Later a double feature was released with a second special and Bardock – The Father of Goku with digitally remastered widescreen format on DVD on February 19, 2008, then on Blu-ray released on July 15, 2008. The second special was re-released to DVD on September 15, 2009, in a remastered-widescreen single-disc edition.
