= Natsuki Hanae =

Japanese voice actor (born 1991)

- 花江 夏樹
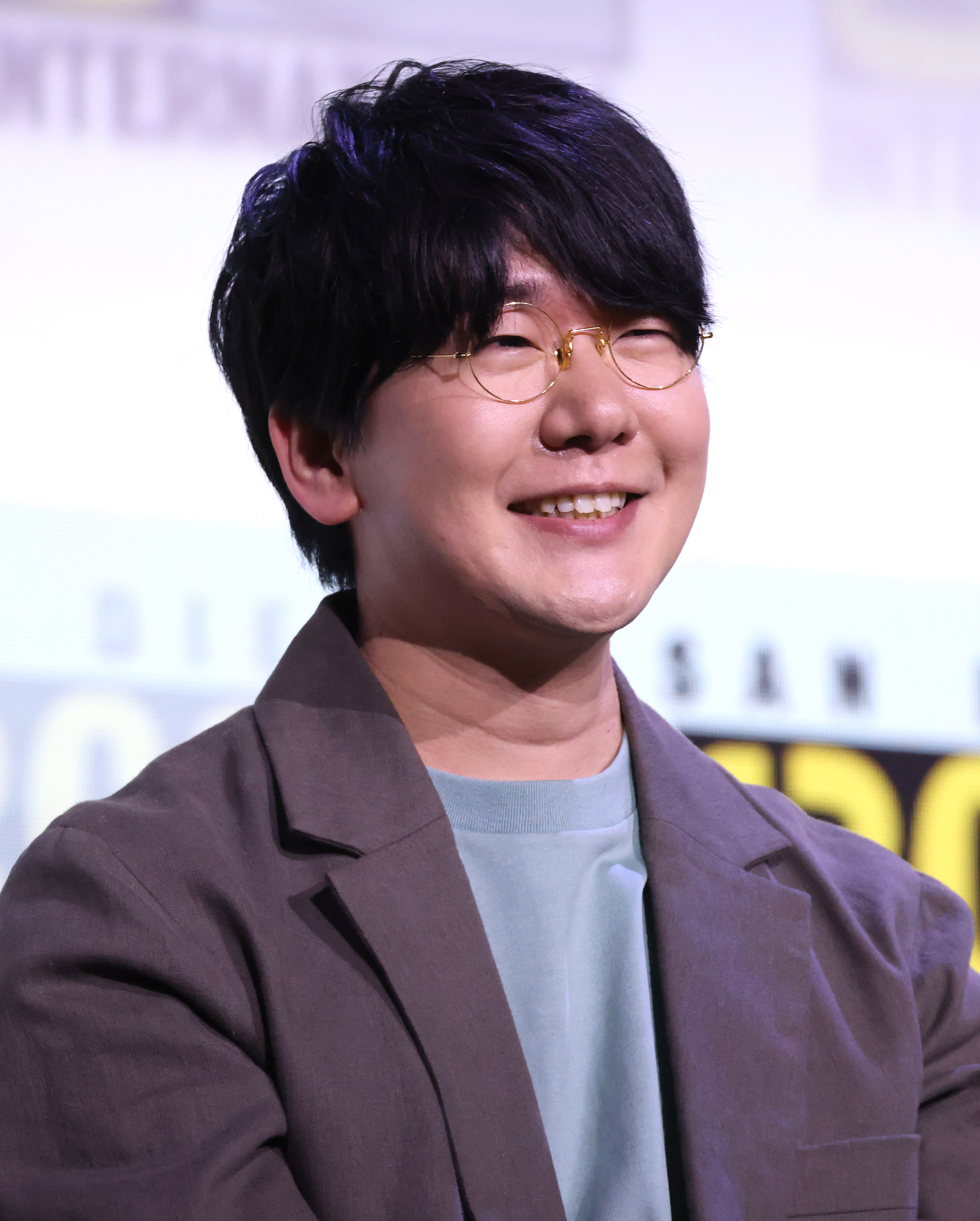
- Hanae in 2025
- Born: June 26, 1991 (age 35); Kanagawa Prefecture, Japan
- Other name: Hana-chan (はなちゃん)
- Occupation: Voice actor
- Years active: 2011–present
- Agent: Across Entertainment
- Notable work: Demon Slayer: Kimetsu no Yaiba as Tanjiro Kamado; Haikyu!! as Korai Hoshiumi; Your Lie in April as Kōsei Arima; Tokyo Ghoul as Ken Kaneki; Dandadan as Ken Takakura; Witch Hat Atelier as Qifrey
- Children: 2

YouTube information
- Channel: Natsuki Hanae
- Years active: 2016–present
- Genre: Let's Play
- Subscribers: 2.19 million
- Views: 1,023,594,021 million
- Last updated: 20 October 2026
- Website: columbia.jp

Natsuki Hanae (Japanese: 花江 夏樹, Hepburn: Hanae Natsuki; born June 26, 1991) is a Japanese voice actor affiliated with Across Entertainment. He voiced Tanjiro Kamado in Demon Slayer: Kimetsu no Yaiba, Ken Kaneki in Tokyo Ghoul, Inaho Kaizuka in Aldnoah.Zero, Takumi Aldini in Food Wars: Shokugeki no Soma, Kōsei Arima in Your Lie in April, Sieg in Fate/Apocrypha, Korai Hoshiumi in Haikyu!!, Vanitas in The Case Study of Vanitas, Haruichi Kominato in Ace of Diamond, Maki Katsuragi in Stars Align, The Duke of Death in The Duke of Death and His Maid, Ken "Okarun" Takakura in Dandadan, and Qifrey in Witch Hat Atelier.

== Career ==
Hanae entered the workforce while in high school. He thought about his career, but planned to become a voice actor. He joined Across Entertainment in November 2009. He made his first leading role in Tari Tari, and was credited as a composer for episodes 5 and 12. Hanae won the Best Rookie award at the 9th Seiyu Awards. He and Ryōta Ōsaka hosted the radio show ŌHana (逢坂市立花江学園, Ōsaka Shiritsu Hanae Gakuen). He began uploading Let's Play videos on YouTube in March 2019, amassing over 500,000 subscribers seven months later.

On July 23, 2021, Hanae wrote on Twitter that his SNS accounts' (Twitter and YouTube) total followers surpassed two million people.

On January 27, 2022, Hanae tested positive for COVID-19. On February 7, 2022, it was announced that he had recovered.

== Personal life ==
On August 27, 2016, Hanae announced that he had married a woman five years his senior. On September 20, 2020, Hanae announced that he has become the father of a pair of fraternal twin girls.

== Filmography ==
=== Anime series ===
Year	Title	Role	Notes	Source
2011	Ben-To	Survival Game Club Member (ep. 9)		
2011	Kimi to Boku	Student Council Member		
2012	Joshiraku	Henchman, Prince, Delivery Man 1		
2012	Love, Elections, & Chocolate	Manager D		
2012	The Pet Girl of Sakurasou	Boy B (ep.2), Zebra (ep.11)	Composer (Episode 5 & 12)	
2012	Say I Love You	Student		
2012	Tari Tari	Atsuhiro Maeda		
2012	To Love-Ru Darkness	Male Student		
2012	Little Busters!	Male Student D		
2013	AKB0048 next stage	Fan B		
2013	Oreshura	Various Extras		
2013	The Pet Girl of Sakurasou	Upperclassmen A		
2013	Samurai Flamenco	Junior High Boy B, Tron Boy		
2013	Gargantia on the Verdurous Planet	Various Extras		
2013	Da Capo III	5 Male Classmates		
2013	A Certain Scientific Railgun S	Staff Member, Announcer		
2013	Doraemon	Merchant		
2013	The Devil Is a Part-Timer!	Sales Clerk B		
2013	Little Busters! Refrain	Student B		
2013	Ro-Kyu-Bu! SS	Young People, Boy 1		
2013	The Severing Crime Edge	Kiri Haimura		
2013	The "Hentai" Prince and the Stony Cat.	Track and Field Member B		
2013	Fantasista Doll	Miura (ep.1), Jun Fujihisa (ep.8)		
2013	Outbreak Company	Shin'ichi Kanō		
2013–2014	Nagi-Asu: A Lull in the Sea	Hikari Sakishima		
2013	Unbreakable Machine-Doll	Puppeteer A	Gray-Haired Boy (A Benchwarmer) (Ep. 1)	
2013–2016	Ace of Diamond	Haruichi Kominato		
2014	Dragon Collection	Various Extras		
2014	Hamatora	Shinji Toyasaki		
2014	World Conquest Zvezda Plot	Asuta Jimon/Dva		
2014	Inari, Konkon, Koi Iroha	RoRo		
2014	Strike the Blood	Meiga Itogami		
2014	Noragami	Student C, Passerby A, Hashimoto (Bully) (ep.8)		
2014	The Pilot's Love Song	Kal-el Albus/Karl La Hire		
2014–2015	Your Lie in April	Kōsei Arima		
2014	Daimidaler: Prince vs Penguin Empire	Shōma Ameku		
2014	Yu-Gi-Oh! Arc-V	Hokuto Shijima	(Known as "Dipper Orion" in English dub)	
2014	Tokyo Ghoul	Ken Kaneki		
2014–2015	Aldnoah.Zero	Inaho Kaizuka		
2014	Sword Art Online II	Kyōji Shinkawa/Spiegel		
2014	Merman in My Tub	Mikuni		
2015	Tokyo Ghoul √A	Ken Kaneki		
2015	Absolute Duo	Tora/Aoi Torasaki		
2015	Maria the Virgin Witch	Gilbert		
2015	Baby Steps 2	Krishna Ramesh		
2015	Mikagura School Suite	Yuto Akama		
2015–2020	Food Wars!: Shokugeki no Soma	Takumi Aldini	5 seasons	
2015	The Heroic Legend of Arslan	Elam		
2015	My Monster Secret	Asahi Kuromine		
2015	Makura no Danshi	Mary/Merry	Performs OP	
2015	Gangsta.	Young Nicolas Brown		
2015	Overlord	Lukeluther Volve		
2015	Charlotte	Maedomari		
2015–2016	Heavy Object	Qwenthur Barbotage		
2015–2016	Mobile Suit Gundam: Iron-Blooded Orphans	Biscuit Griffon		
2015–2019	Star-Myu: High School Star Musical	Yūta Hoshitani	Performs ED with Kensho Ono, Yoshimasa Hosoya, Tomoaki Maeno, & Arthur Lounsbery, 3 seasons	
2015–2018	Dragon Ball Super	Jaco the Galactic Patrolman		
2016	Active Raid	Mythos		
2016	Haruchika	Shinjirō Kusakabe		
2016	Divine Gate	Ariton		
2016	Prince of Stride: Alternative	Yu Kamoda		
2016–2017	Twin Star Exorcists	Rokuro Enmadō		
2015	Classroom of the Elite	Kiyotaka Ayanokōji		
2016	Rilu Rilu Fairilu ~ Yousei no Door ~	Nozomu Hanamura		
2016	B-Project: Kodō＊Ambitious	Yūta Ashū		
2016	D.Gray-man Hallow	Lavi		
2016–2019	The Disastrous Life of Saiki K.	Reita Toritsuka	Performs the first opening and second ending	
2016	Fate/kaleid liner Prisma Illya 3rei	Julian Ainsworth		
2017	Masamune-kun's Revenge	Masamune Makabe		
2017	One Piece	Grount		
2017	Room Mate	Aoi Nishina		
2017	Rilu Rilu Fairilu: Mahō no Kagami	Nozomu Hanamura		
2017	Tsukipro The Animation	Rikka Sera		
2017	Fate/Apocrypha	Sieg		
2017–2021	Black Clover	Rill Boismortier		
2017	Children of the Whales	Chakuro		
2017	Katsugeki/Touken Ranbu	Higekiri		
2017	Sengoku Night Blood	Toyotomi Hideyoshi	Performed an opening song with Toshiyuki Morikawa, Kousuke Toriumi, Katsuyuki Konishi, Daiki Yamashita and Yūichirō Umehara	
2018	Tokyo Ghoul:re	Ken Kaneki/Haise Sasaki		
2018	Cardcaptor Sakura: Clear Card	Yuna D. Kaito		
2018	Grand Blue	Yū Mitarai		
2018	Touken Ranbu: Hanamaru 2	Higekiri		
2018	Happy Sugar Life	Taiyō Mitsuboshi		
2018–2019	Beyblade Burst Turbo (Note: Known in Japan as Beyblade Burst Chouzetsu (Super Z).)	Xhan Bogard		
2018–2019	Million Arthur	Kakka Arthur		
2019	That Time I Got Reincarnated as a Slime	Yūki Kagurazaka		
2019–2020	Ace of Diamond Act II	Haruichi Kominato		
2019–present	Demon Slayer: Kimetsu no Yaiba	Tanjiro Kamado		
2019	Kono Oto Tomare! Sounds of Life	Takeru Kurata		
2019–2020	Beyblade Burst Rise (Note: Known in Japan as Beyblade Burst Gachi (GT).)	Fumiya Kindo		
2019	O Maidens in Your Savage Season	Satoshi Sugimoto		
2019	Ensemble Stars!	Hiyori Tomoe		
2019	Stand My Heroes: Piece of Truth	Kotaro Yui		
2019	Stars Align	Maki Katsuragi		
2020	Haikyu!! To the Top	Kōrai Hoshiumi		
2020	Smile Down the Runway	Ikuto Tsumura		
2020	Cagaster of an Insect Cage	Acht		
2020–2022	Yu-Gi-Oh! Sevens	Gakuto Sōgetsu, Gakugen Sōgetsu		
2020	Kakushigoto	Satsuki Tomaruin		
2020	Sing "Yesterday" for Me	Rō Hayakawa		
2020	Gleipnir	Shuichi Kagaya		
2020	Appare-Ranman!	Appare Sorano		
2020	Get Up! Get Live!	Junya Uehara		
2020	Ikebukuro West Gate Park	Isogai		
2020	The Day I Became a God	Yōta Narukami		
2020–2023	Attack on Titan: The Final Season	Falco Grice		
2021	I-Chu: Halfway Through the Idol	Noah		
2021	Kemono Jihen	Shiki Tademaru		
2021	Skate-Leading Stars	Yukimitsu Mochizuki		
2021	Burning Kabaddi	Manabu Sakura		
2021	Kingdom Season 3	Fu Di		
2021	Odd Taxi	Odokawa		
2021	Gloomy the Naughty Grizzly	Pity-kun		
2021	The Duke of Death and His Maid	Duke of Death		
2021	Re-Main	Takeshi Toyama		
2021	Life Lessons with Uramichi Oniisan	Eddy Edei		
2021–2022	The Case Study of Vanitas	Vanitas		
2021–present	Tsukimichi: Moonlit Fantasy	Makoto Misumi	Main character	
2021	Platinum End	Revel		
2021	Tokyo Revengers Seiya Kessen-Hen	Hajime Kokonoi	Episode 2–4, 7-9 and 11	
2022	Sabikui Bisco	Milo Nekoyanagi		
2022	Fanfare of Adolescence	Amane Grace		
2022	Love All Play	Ryō Mizushima		
2022	Yu-Gi-Oh! Go Rush!!	Manabu Sōgetsu		
2022	Insect Land	Accel		
2022	Heroines Run the Show	Kotarō Enomoto		
2022	Summer Time Rendering	Shinpei Ajiro		
2022	Orient	Kanetatsu Naoe		
2022	Parallel World Pharmacy	Kanji Yakutani		
2022	The Prince of Tennis II: U-17 World Cup	Prince Ludovic Chardard		
2022	Mobile Suit Gundam: The Witch from Mercury	Elan Ceres		
2022	Blue Lock	Ikki Niko		
2022	Bleach: Thousand-Year Blood War	Gremmy Thoumeaux		
2022	Chainsaw Man	Shark Fiend/Beam		
2023	Nier: Automata Ver1.1a	YoRHa No. 9 Type S (9S)		
2023	My Love Story with Yamada-kun at Lv999	Eita Sasaki		
2023	Opus Colors	Jun Tsuzuki		
2023	Mashle	Cell War		
2023	Paradox Live the Animation	Ryū Natsume		
2023	You Were Experienced, I Was Not: Our Dating Story	Ryūto Kashima		
2023	The Vexations of a Shut-In Vampire Princess	Chaostel Conte		
2023	Undead Unluck	Shen		
2024	Tsukimichi: Moonlit Fantasy 2nd Season	Makoto Misumi		
2024	Bye Bye, Earth	Kitty the All		
2024	Dandadan	Ken Takakura/Okarun		
2024	Shangri-La Frontier 2nd Season	Ceecrue		
2025	Sakamoto Days	Yoichi Nagumo		
2025	I'm the Evil Lord of an Intergalactic Empire!	Liam		
2025	To Be Hero X	Nice Lin Ling		
2025	Apocalypse Hotel	Ponstin		
2025	Tougen Anki	Juji Yusurube		
2025	Wind Breaker Season 2	Shūhei Suzuri		
2026	The Holy Grail of Eris	Enrique Adelbide		
2026	Dead Account	Renri Hasumi		
2026	Always a Catch!	Ireneo		
2026	Petals of Reincarnation	Yoshiki Minami		
2026	Witch Hat Atelier	Qifrey		
2026	Ace of Diamond Act II season 2	Haruichi Kominato		
2026	Liar Game	Norihiko Yokoya		
2026	So What's Wrong with Getting Reborn as a Goblin?	Albert		
2026	The Seven Knights of the Marronnier Kingdom	Justice		
2027	Phantom Busters	Eugene Korekishi		

=== Anime films ===
Year	Title	Role	Notes	Source
2013	Code Geass: Akito the Exiled	Kuzan Montoban	Film Series (First appears in Ep. 2)	
2014	Kuro no Sumika -Chronus-	Makoto Nakazono	Featured Short for Anime Mirai 2014 by Studio 4°C	
2015	Dragon Ball Z: Resurrection 'F'	Jaco the Galactic Patrolman		
2015–2018	Digimon Adventure tri.	Taichi Yagami	(Known as Tai Kamiya in the English dub)	
2016	Zutto Mae Kara Suki Deshita	Kotaro Enomoto		
2016	Suki ni Naru Sono Shunkan o	Kotaro Enomoto		
2017	Fate/kaleid liner Prisma Illya: Vow in the Snow	Julian Ichigi	Also known as Julian Ainsworth	
2020	Digimon Adventure: Last Evolution Kizuna	Taichi Yagami		
2020	A Whisker Away	Kento		
2020	Demon Slayer: Kimetsu no Yaiba the Movie: Mugen Train	Tanjirō Kamado		
2021	Fortune Favors Lady Nikuko	Ninomiya		
2021	Words Bubble Up Like Soda Pop	Japan		
2022	Goodbye, Don Glees!	Rōma Kamogawa		
2022	Odd Taxi: In the Woods	Odokawa		
2022	Crayon Shin-chan: Mononoke Ninja Chinpūden	Gomaemon Hesogakure		
2023	Kaina of the Great Snow Sea: Star Sage	Byōzan		
2024	Haikyu!! The Dumpster Battle	Kōrai Hoshiumi		
2024	A Few Moments of Cheers	Kanata Asaya		
2024	Zegapain STA	Sid		
2025	Eiga Odekake Kozame Tokai no Otomodachi	Haruto		
2025	Chainsaw Man – The Movie: Reze Arc	Beam		
2025	Demon Slayer: Kimetsu no Yaiba – The Movie: Infinity Castle	Tanjirō Kamado		
2025	Dive in Wonderland			
2026	All You Need Is Kill	Keiji		
2026	Cosmic Princess Kaguya!	Koto Okkotteru		
2026	Shin Gekijōban Keroro Gunsō: Fukkatsu Shite Sokkō Chikyū Metsubō no Kiki de Arimasu!	Alien		

=== Original video animation ===
Year	Title	Role	Notes	Source
2013	To Love Ru Darkness OVA – Nana & Momo	Student	OVA 5	
2014	Inari, Konkon, Koi Iroha	RoRo		
2014	Chain Chronicle	Wayne		
2014	World Conquest Zvezda Plot The New Great Zvezda Operation	Asuta Jimon/Dva	Unaired episode included on Blu-ray/DVD	
2014	Ace of Diamond Face: Ryosuke Kominato Special Bonus Story	Haruichi Kominato	Included in Vol. 44 Manga Bundle DVD	
2015	Ace of Diamond Youichi Kuramochi Special Bonus Story	Haruichi Kominato	Included in Vol. 45 Manga Bundle DVD	
2015	Your Lie in April MOMENTS	Kōsei Arima	Included in Vol. 11 Bundle DVD	
2015	Gakuen Handsome The Animation	Yoshiaki Maeda		
2015	Food Wars: Shokugeki no Sōma	Takumi Aldini	Included in Vol. 18 Bundle DVD	

=== Original net animation ===
Year	Title	Role	Notes	Source
2020	MILGRAM	Mikoto Kayano		
2021	The Heike Story	Taira no Kiyotsune		
2022	Romantic Killer	Hijiri Koganei		
2024	Omori (manga)	Basil		
2024	Mary Mary Mary	Himself	Cameo	
2025	Disney Twisted-Wonderland the Animation	Riddle Rosehearts		
2026	Yu-Gi-Oh! Card Game The Chronicles	Aleister		

=== Drama CD ===
List of voice performances in drama CD
Year	Title	Role	Notes	Source
2016	Dear Vocalist	(2)YOU	CD Drama	
2017	Dear Vocalist Riot	(2)YOU	CD Drama	
2017	Dear Vocalist Wired	(2)YOU	CD Drama	
2018	Dear Vocalist Xtreme	(2)YOU	CD Drama	
2019	Dear Vocalist Evolve	(2)YOU	CD Drama	
2020	Paradox Live	Ryu Natsume	CD Drama	

=== Video games ===
Year	Title	Role	Notes	Source
2010	Brave Cross		PC Game	
2013	SNOW BOUND LAND	Will	Otome game on PS Portable	
2013	Boyfriend (Beta)	Naokage Yoshiya	Otome game on iOS & Android	
2014	Amnesia	Nova	Otome game on PS Vita	
2014	Ayakashi Koigikyoku	U/KI (Yuki)	Otome game on Windows Systems	
2014	Clover Toshokan no Jūnintachi	Riku	Otome game on Windows Systems	
2014	Core Masters	Londemark	MOBA game on Windows Systems	
2014	Medabots 8 Kabuto Ver./Kuwagata Ver.	Salt/Soruto	RPG on Nintendo 3DS	
2014	Rage of Bahamut	Sorceror Miguel, Pain Immortal	Card battle game on iOS, Android	
2014	Koe Kare ~Meeting You After School~	Hinata Kasuga	Otome game on Windows & Mac OS systems	
2015	Fantasy Earth: Zero	Calm Boy II, Friendly Boy I	TPS, RTS, MMORPG on Windows Systems	
2015	Touken Ranbu	Higekiri	Collectible card browser game	
2015	Dragon Ball XenoVerse	Jaco the Galactic Patrolman, Time Patroller (Male 2)	Fighting RPG on PS3, PS4, Xbox One, Xbox 360, Windows systems	
2015	Tokyo Ghoul: Carnaval	Ken Kaneki	Action RPG on iOS, Android	
2015	Taishō×Taishō Alice	Ōkami	Otome game on Windows systems	
2015	Yume Ōkoko to Nemureru 100-ri no Ōji-sama	Makoto, Ōka	Match 3 puzzle Otome RPG on iOS, Android	
2015	Poitto Hero	Axelina, Allen, Charon, George, Lobelia	RPG game on iOS, Android	
2015	Yome Collection	Inaho Kaizuka	Simulation game on iOS, Android	
2015	Royal Flush Heroes	"Kasshoku no Kikōshi" Xelha	RPG on iOS, Android	
2015	Clover Toshokan no Jūnintachi II	Riku	Otome game on Windows Systems	
2015	Possession Magenta	Osamu Shirota	Murder mystery otome game on PS Vita	
2015	I-Chū	Noah	Otome rhythm game on iOS, Android	
2015	Tokyo Otome Restaurant	Akane Kadokura	Restaurant simulation game on iOS, Android	
2015	Dengeki Bunko: Fighting Climax Ignition	Qwenthur Barbotage	Fighting game in arcades and on PS3, PS4 (Character from Heavy Object)	
2015	Prince of Stride	Yū Kamoda, Ryō Izumino	Otome game on PS Vita	
2015	School of Ragnarok	Ivor de Dacant	Fighting game (only available in arcades)	
2015	Dragon's Dogma Online	Elliott		
2015	Saga of Ishtaria	Finn, Hermes	RPG Game on iOS, Android	
2015	Yumeiro Cast	Iori Fujimura	Otome rhythm game on iOS, Android	
2015	Tokyo Ghoul: JAIL	Ken Kaneki	Action RPG on PS Vita	
2015	Arslan: The Warriors of Legend	Elam	Hack and Slash RPG Game on PS3, PS4, Xbox One, & Windows (Steam)	
2015	Pop Up Story ~Mahō no Hon to Seiki no Gakuen~	Ziz Glover	RPG Game on iOS, Android	
2015	Bad Apple Wars	Satoru	Otome Action RPG on PS Vita	
2015	Sangoku: Cross Saga ~Sōten no Kizuna~	Protagonist	Strategy war game on iOS, Android	
2015	Genpei Renaigumi Eden	Fujiwara no Yorinaga	Match 3 puzzle otome browser game	
2015	Shokugeki no Sōma: Yūjō to Kizuna no Hitosara	Takumi Aldini	Cooking Simulation RPG on Nintendo 3DS	
2015	Hortensia Saga -Ao no Kishidan-	Fred	Action RPG on iOS, Android	
2016	Sangoku Brave	Zhao Yun	RPG game on iOS, Android	
2016	SENTAMA	Maeda Toshiie, Ranmaru Mori	Strategy war game on iOS, Android	
2016	Shironeko Project	Umarus Feadestal, Viper; Nightadder, Starter Nukki	RPG Game on iOS, Android	
2016	Period Cube ~Shackles of Amadeus~	Libera	Otome game on PS Vita	
2016	Collar × Malice	Akito Sera	Mystery Otome game on PS Vita	
2016	Fate/Grand Order	Fuma Kotaro, Sieg	Android	
TBR (2016)	Wanderer of Phantasia	Mitsuhide Akechi	RPG Game on iOS, Android	
TBR (2016)	GARM STRUGGLE ~Kyō Kusari no Ban Inu~	Kiori Adashino	Otome game on iOS, Android	
TBR (2016)	Last Period	Haru	RPG on iOS, Android	
TBR	Gate of Rebellion	Sabiku	MMORPG on iOS, Android	
TBR	The Alchemist Code	Logi Crowley	RPG on iOS, Android	
TBR	Tales of the Rays	Ix Neve	RPG on iOS, Android	
TBR	Band Yarouze!	Ray Cephart	Rhythm game on iOS, Android	
TBR	Fortissimo	Towa Morishima	Otome game on PS Vita	
TBR	League of Legends	Ziggs, Veigar, Heimerdinger	MOBA game on MacOS and Windows systems (Only in JP server)	
2017	Fire Emblem Heroes	Alm		
2017	Nier: Automata	YoRHa No. 9 Type S (9S)	Action Role-playing Game on PlayStation 4, Xbox One & Windows system	
2017	Fire Emblem Echoes: Shadows of Valentia	Alm	Nintendo 3DS	
2017	The Alchemist Code	Logi Crowley	RPG on iOS, Android	
2017	Tsukino Paradise	Rikka Sera	Rhythm game on iOS and Android	
2017	B-Project: Muteki＊Dangerous	Yūta Ashū	Rhythm game on iOS and Android	
2017	Ikemen Kakumei: Alice to Koi no Mahou	Jonah Clemence	Otome Game on iOS, Android	
2017	Ensemble Stars!	Hiyori Tomoe	Mobile game on iOS and Android	
2017	Akane-sasu Sekai de Kimi to Utau	Tokugawa Yoshimune	Otome game on iOS and Android	
2018	PopoloCrois Story Narcia's and the Fairy's Flute	Alba	Mobile game on iOS and Android	
2018	Food Fantasy	Crab Long Bao, Hotdog, Salad	iOS and Android	
2018	DREAM!ing	Senri Nito	Mobile game on iOS and Android	
2019	Atelier Lulua: The Scion of Arland	Kristoff Aurel Arland	PlayStation 4, Nintendo Switch, and Microsoft Windows	
2019	Granblue Fantasy	Geo	Android, iOS, web browser	
2019	Another Eden	Mighty	Mobile game on iOS and Android	
2019	Dragon Quest XI S	Norberto（As a teenager）	Nintendo Switch	
2019	Tokyo Ghoul: re Call to Exist	Ken Kaneki / Haise Sasaki	PS4 and PC	
2019	Punishing: Gray Raven	Changyu	Android, iOS	
2020	Disney: Twisted-Wonderland	Riddle Rosehearts	Mobile game on iOS and Android	
2020	Illusion connect – Bontemmaru	Super prism games	Mobile game on Android and iOS	
2020	Dragalia Lost	Sylas	Mobile game on Android and iOS	
2021	Monster Hunter Rise	Buddy Handler Iori	Nintendo Switch	
2021	Rune Factory 5	Reinhard	RPG on Nintendo Switch	
2021	Demon Slayer: Kimetsu no Yaiba – The Hinokami Chronicles	Tanjiro Kamado	PlayStation 4, PlayStation 5, Xbox One, Xbox Series X/S, and Microsoft Windows	
2021	Gate of Nightmares	Oliver S. Estrea	Android, iOS	
2022	Octopath Traveler: Champions of the Continent	YoRHa No. 9 Type S (9S), Sail	Mobile game on Android and iOS	
2022	Star Ocean: The Divine Force	Albaird	PlayStation 4, PlayStation 5, Xbox One, Xbox Series X/S, and Microsoft Windows	
2022	Arena of Valor	Tanjiro Kamado	Mobile game on Android and iOS	
2022	Valkyrie Elysium	Armand	PlayStation 4, PlayStation 5, and Microsoft Windows	
2022	Fitness Runners	Ray	Nintendo Switch	
2022	Ninja Must Die	Kuro	Mobile game on iOS and Android	
2024	Wuthering Waves	Lingyang	Android, iOS, Microsoft Windows, PlayStation 5	
2024	Reynatis	Kiichirou Ukai	PlayStation 4, PlayStation 5, Nintendo Switch, PC	
2024	Metaphor: ReFantazio	Protagonist (Will)	PlayStation 5, Xbox Series X/S, and Microsoft Windows	
2024	Identity V	Matthias Czernin (Puppeteer)	Android, iOS, PC	
2025	Dead by Daylight	Ken Kaneki / The Ghoul	Tokyo Ghoul DLC	
2027	Danganronpa 2×2	Sakutaro Higashi		
TBA	Devil Prince and Puppet	Fiori	Mobile game on iOS and Android	

=== Dubbing roles ===
Live-action
Title	Role	Voice dub for	Notes	Source
Alex Rider	Alex Rider	Otto Farrant		
Artemis Fowl	Artemis Fowl II	Ferdia Shaw		
Cruella	Artie	John McCrea		
Deadpool & Wolverine	Headpool	Nathan Fillion		
Detention	Wei Chung-ting	Tseng Jing-hua		
A Gift from Bob	Ben	Stefan Race		
Hank Zipzer	Hank Zipzer	Nick James		
Monster Hunter	Axe	MC Jin		
Pacific Rim: Uprising	Suresh	Karan Brar		
Project Hail Mary	Rocky	James Ortiz		

Animation
Title	Role	Notes	Source
Arcane	Cecil B. Heimerdinger		
Ballerina	Victor		
The Cuphead Show!	Cuphead		
The Garfield Movie	Jon Arbuckle		
I Am What I Am	Chun		
Inside Out 2	Pouchy		
Toy Story 5		Cameo	
Turning Red	Devon		

=== Television ===
List of television appearances
Year	Title	Role	Notes	Source
2016–2020	Oha Suta	Himself	Nicknamed "Hana-chan"; MC from Mondays to Fridays	
2020	Jounetsu Tairiku	Himself	Vol. 1130	
2021	Oh My Boss! Love Not Included	Ukyō Arazome	Episode 2	
2021	Kasou Taishou	Himself	As a judge	
2021	Seiyū Tantei	Binaura-kun (voice)		
2022	Involvement in Family Affairs	Narrator		
2023	Vivant	Newscaster	Episode 6; cameo	
2024	Bakuage Sentai Boonboomger	Byun Diesel, Boonboom Controller		
2026	Vivant	Newscaster	Season 2 Episode 11 (1 in the season); cameo	

== Awards ==
Year	Award	Category	Result	Source
2015	9th Seiyu Awards	Best Rookie actors	Won	
2019	Newtype Anime Awards 2018–2019	Best Actor	Won	
2020	42nd Anime Grand Prix	Most Popular Voice Actor of the Year	Won	
2020	14th Seiyu Awards	Best Actor in a Leading Role	Won	
