= Dale D. Kelly =

American actor

Dale D. Kelly (sometimes credited as Dale Kelly and Kelly Dale) is an American voice actor and singer, part of the original Funimation voice cast for their English version of Dragon Ball Z. He played the role of Captain Ginyu, and was also the narrator for Seasons 3 & 4. He left Funimation in 2001 for unknown reasons, and Brice Armstrong replaced him as the voice of Captain Ginyu for the video games and the uncut version of Season 2. In addition, Brice re-recorded Dale's voice for Captain Ginyu for the remastered boxed sets. Kyle Hebert replaced Dale as the narrator for Seasons 5 & 6, all movies, and in the uncut versions of seasons 1-2. Kyle also re-recorded Dale's narration in the remaining episodes and specials for the remastered boxed sets. As of now, Dale's voice has been completely removed from the Dragon Ball series (save for some of Captain Ginyu's battle grunts, which were left in due to Brice Armstrong's age, and a few background voices).

Dale was also a prominent figure in the music department for Dragon Ball Z. He is known for producing the soundtracks for the two DBZ specials.

== Notable Credits ==
=== Voice Roles ===
- Dragon Ball Z as Narrator (American Eps 54 - 179; Original release), Captain Ginyu (American Eps 54 - 107; Original release), Additional voices
- Dragon Ball Z: Bardock – The Father of Goku as Narrator (Original release)
- Dragon Ball Z: The History of Trunks as Narrator (Original release)

=== Music Credits ===
- Dragon Ball Z - Music Supervisor
- Dragon Ball Z: Bardock – The Father of Goku - Music and Soundtrack Producer
- Dragon Ball Z: The History of Trunks - Music and Soundtrack Producer
