= List of The Case Study of Vanitas characters =

The recurring characters from the series.

The characters of the manga series The Case Study of Vanitas were created by Jun Mochizuki.

== Protagonists ==
=== Vanitas ===
Voiced by: Natsuki Hanae (Japanese); Zeno Robinson, Cherami Leigh (young) (English)

Vanitas (ヴァニタス, Vanitasu) is a young man with black hair who was born a human. The name "Vanitas" was given to him by the Vampire of the Blue Moon who bit him, making him part of the Blue Moon clan with some vampire abilities. He possesses the grimoire called The Book of Vanitas which is an analytical engine powered by a special form of astermite and has the appearance of a book. He believes the grimoire can restore vampires who have become "curse-bearers" with uncontrolled bloodlust due to their name being corrupted. He enlists Noé in his quest. When he was a child, his parents were killed by a vampire and he was orphaned and taken in by the Chasseurs. However, he became a victim of Doctor Moreau's experiments to enhance human abilities and was referred to as number "69."

=== Noé Archiviste ===
Voiced by: Kaito Ishikawa, Ayaka Nanase (young) (Japanese); Stephen Fu, Mary Morgan (young) (English)

Noé Archiviste (ノエ・アルシヴィスト, Noe Arushivisuto) is a vampire and child of the Shapeless One with white hair. He is member of the Archivist Clan, "the Fangs that Lay Bare Blood," which has the power to read people's memories after drinking their blood. He was raised by a man whom he calls "Teacher." He was the one who sent Noé to Paris to discern the power of The Book of Vanitas. Despite his disliking to Vanitas, Noé joins Vanitas in his quest to save cursed vampires. He has a white cat named Murr.

== Other characters ==
=== Jeanne ===
Voiced by: Inori Minase (Japanese); Molly Searcy (English) Jeanne (ジャンヌ, Jannu), also known as the Hellfire Witch, is a former executioner and acts as a chevalier to Luca. She wields the crimson gauntlet called "Carpe Diem." Her parents were students of Lord Ruthven and she once went to Castle Gévaudan where she met the young-looking Chloé, a vampire hidden away by her father Marquis d'Apchier and who treated Jeanne like a younger sister. As a bourreau she is later sent to slay Chloé, Beast of Gévaudan. Jeanne is attracted to Vanitas, but is embarrassed when he openly declares his love for her.

=== Dominique de Sade ===
Voiced by: Ai Kayano (Japanese); Alexis Tipton (English)

Dominique "Domi" de Sade (ドミニク・ド・サド, Dominiku do Sado) is a lady of de Sade vampire aristocracy family. Along with her older sister Veronica and twin brother Louis, she is a daughter of the Marquis de Sade, Lord of Altus, and is an heir to the de Sade family. Her attendant is Kreisler, which spouts flowers and petals. When they were children, her brother Louis was killed because he became a curse-bearer and she feels responsible for his death.

=== Vanitas of the Blue Moon ===
Voiced by: Natsumi Fujiwara (fairy tale), Romi Park (Japanese); Xanthe Huynh (fairy tale), Marissa Lenti (English)

Vanitas of the Blue Moon (蒼月の吸血鬼, Sougetsu no Vampir (Note: Vanitas of the Blue Moon is originally referred to as "Fairy tale Vanitas" (童話ヴァニタス, Dōwa Vanitasu).)) is the first blue moon vampire and creator of The Book of Vanitas. The vampire has an androgynous appearance and blue colored blood. The vampire was born under a blue moon who swore vengeance on the "crimson moon" vampires who cast out the Blue Moon vampires because of their origin. Vanitas calls him Luna (Spanish for "Moon) and sees her as a mother figure despite her claiming she has no gender.

=== Lucius Oriflamme ===
Voiced by: Shino Shimoji (Japanese); Dani Chambers (English)

Lucius "Luca" Oriflamme (ルキウス・オリフラム, Rukiusu Orifuramu) is a young noble vampire and the nephew of Lord Ruthven and the future Grand Duke of Oriflamme. He is in the search for The Book of Vanitas which he hopes will provide a cure for his older brother who is an imprisoned curse-bearer.

=== Amelia Ruth ===
Voiced by: Noriko Shitaya (Japanese); Hayden Daviau (English)

Amelia Ruth (アメリア・ルース, Ameria Rūsu) is a "curse-bearer" vampire whose "malnomen" or corrupted name was Eglantine, the Prison of Briars. Her true name is Florifel. She is saved by Vanitas and later works as a maid at Hotel Chouchou where Vanitas and Noé stay while in Paris.

=== Louis de Sade ===
Voiced by: Miyuri Shimabukuro (Japanese); Ciarán Strange (English)

Louis de Sade (ルイ・ド・サド, Rui do Sado) is Dominque's twin brother and Noé's childhood friend. He became a curse-bearer and was beheaded in front of Dominique and Noé while he was still a boy.

=== Veronica de Sade ===
Voiced by: Yoko Hikasa (Japanese); Monica Rial (English)

Veronica de Sade (ヴェロニカ・ド・サド, Veronika do Sado) is the older sister of Dominique, a Beastia. Marquis Machina's lover.

=== Dante ===
Voiced by: Tarō Kiuchi (Japanese); Ian Sinclair (English)

Dante (ダンテ) is a dhampir who sells Vanitas information. He is assisted by his associates, Richie and Johann.

=== Johann ===
Voiced by: Kōji Yusa (Japanese); Jessie James Grelle (Note: Credited as Josh Grelle; Grelle came out as transgender and changed their name in 2023.) (English)

Johann (ヨハン) is a dhampir associate of Vanitas and Dante. He seems particularly close to the latter.

=== Teacher ===
Voiced by: Akira Ishida (Japanese); John Burgmeier (English)

Teacher (先生, Sensei) is the grandfather of Louis, Dominique and Veronica de Sade and has ties to the vampire queen. He also raised Noé, whom he affectionately calls "mon chaton" or "my kitten". He later sent Noé to Paris to learn about The Book of Vanitas.

=== August Ruthven ===
Voiced by: Toshiyuki Morikawa (Japanese); Jason Douglas (English)

August Ruthven (オーガスト・ルスヴン, Ōgasuto Rusuvun) is an influential lord of vampires and peacemaker who helped end the war between vampires and humans. He now serves the vampire queen as a member of the senate.

=== Roland Fortis ===
Voiced by: Kengo Kawanishi (Japanese); Ricco Fajardo (English)

Roland Fortis (ローラン・フォルティス, Rōran Forutisu) is a chasseur working in the Catacombs. Known as the Sixth Paladin or Roland of Jasper. Previously Olivier's second in command before becoming a paladin. He wields a mighty spear called "Durandal".

=== Parks Orlok ===
Voiced by: Itaru Yamamoto (Japanese); Cris George (English)

Parks Orlok (パークス・オルロック, Pākusu Orurokku) is appointed by the queen to manage vampire affairs in human Paris. He maintained that curse-bearers must be beheaded by bourreaus because he believed that they could not be saved. Noé and Vanitas report to him. He controls access to "The Barrier", a spatial distortion linking the human world to Altus, the vampire's world.

=== Nox ===
Voiced by: Arisa Kiyoto (Japanese); Katelyn Barr (English)

Nox (ノックス, Nokkusu) is one of Count Parks Orlok's personal security. She works alongside her brother, Manet.

=== Manet ===
Voiced by: Itsuki Kurita (Japanese); Alex Mai (English)

Manet (マーネ, Māne) is one of Count Parks Orlok's personal security. He works alongside his sister, Nox.

=== Olivier ===
Voiced by: Tomoaki Maeno (Japanese); Christopher Wehkamp (English)

Olivier (オリヴィエ, Orivie) is a chasseur paladin and an old friend of Roland's. He wields a violent sword known as "Hauteclaire".

=== Astolfo Granatum ===
Voiced by: Ayumu Murase (Japanese); Brandon McInnis, Amber Lee Connors (young) (English)

Astolfo Granatum (アストルフォ・グラナトゥム, Asutorufo Guranatumu) is the youngest chasseur paladin. Known as Astolfo of Garnet. He comes from a family with longstanding ties to the church, but his family were killed by a young vampire he befriended as a child, which caused his all-consuming hatred of vampires. He wields a mighty spear called "Louisette".

=== Moreau ===
Voiced by: Kouzou Douzaka (Japanese); Scott Gibbs (English)

Moreau (モロー, Morō) is a scientist previously employed by the Chasseurs to research vampires, experimenting both on vampires and humans, including the young Vanitas who was then referred to as "69". When Moreau became obsessed with becoming a vampire himself, he was exiled from the Chasseurs. He collaborated with Charlatan and secretly continued his experiments in his lab without the knowledge of the Chasseurs.

=== Chloé d'Apchier ===
Voiced by: Rie Kugimiya (Japanese); Brina Palencia (English)

Chloé d'Apchier (クロエ・ダプシェ, Kuroe Dapushe) is the daughter of Marquis d'Apchier and is known as the "Silver Witch". She is both a "curse-bearer" vampire and suspected to be the Beast of Gévaudan. She was identified as a vampire in the 16th century and stopped aging at 11 years old. Her family set about trying to create an Alternate Engine over centuries in an effort to make her human again. August Ruthven brought Jeanne to stay with her for a while, but she became wracked with loneliness when he took Jeanne back.

=== Jean-Jacques Chastel ===
Voiced by: Daiki Hamano, Makoto Koichi (young) (Japanese); J. Michael Tatum, Emily Fajardo (young) (English)

Jean-Jacques Chastel (ジャン = ジャック・シャステル, Jan Jakku Shasuteru) is Chloé's protector and provides her with a ready supply of his own blood. He sacrificed his humanity to become the Beast of Gévaudan in order to protect Chloé from the outside forces attempting to kill her.

=== Mikhail ===
Voiced by: Mikako Komatsu (Japanese); Bryson Baugus, Steph Garrett (young) (English)

Mikhail (ミハイル, Mihairu) is the son of a prostitute who was killed by a vampire, and after being taken in by the Chasseurs, he was passed to Moreau for his experiments who referred to him as No.71. He met Vanitas whom he regarded as an older brother and both were rescued by the Vampire of the Blue Moon who taught them about malnomen, astermite, and The Book of Vanitas.

=== Loki Oriflamme ===
Voiced by: Noriaki Sugiyama (Japanese); Daman Mills (English)

Loki Oriflamme (ロキ・オリフラム, Roki Orifuramu) is a formerly noble vampire and Lucius' older brother. He is a vampire with black sclerae and blue pupils, similar to the Vampire of the Blue Moon.

== Reception ==
The characters of Vanitas, Noé and, Jeanne were popular on Anime Trending, with Vanitas and Jeanne being nominated in the couple category. The handling of vampirism between Jeanne and Vanitas as well as Dominique and Noé was listed by Caitlin Moore from Anime News Network as the best moment in anime, due to the amount of sex appeal they portray directly. Vanitas changing from fighting Jeanne into forcing a kiss with her was criticized for failing to reach comedy in the place of a seemingly scary scene, due to the discomfort he causes for the woman he suddenly announces his unconditional love to, whereas Dominique objectifies Noe in an uncomfortable way. El Palomitron suggested that while there is no boys' love between the two leads due to the focus on other more explored relationships, El Palomitrón still found Vanitas and Noe's connection deep and comparable to the one the former shares with Jeanne, as a result of the themes each share.
