= Dragon Ball Xenoverse =

2015 video game

Dragon Ball: Xenoverse
- Japanese cover art featuring Super Saiyan Goku
- Developer: Dimps
- Publisher: Bandai Namco Games
- Directors: Yuka Kobayashi; Takeshi Sakamoto
- Producer: Masahiro Kashino
- Designers: Tsuyoshi Narabayashi; Takuya Katayama; Yoichi Hayashi
- Programmers: Koji Okugawa; Kohei Hanaoka; Yoshiaki Kitagawa
- Artist: Akira Toriyama
- Writers: Kaori Osamura; Sou Mayumi
- Composers: Yoshichika Kuriyama; Shiho Tereda; Atsushi Yokozeki
- Series: Dragon Ball
- Platforms: Microsoft Windows; PlayStation 3; PlayStation 4; Xbox 360; Xbox One
- Release: JP: February 5, 2015; NA: February 24, 2015; EU: February 27, 2015; Microsoft Windows: WW: February 27, 2015
- Genres: Action role-playing, fighting
- Modes: Single-player, multiplayer

Dragon Ball Xenoverse (Note: Japanese: ドラゴンボールゼノバース, Hepburn: Doragon Bōru Zenobāsu) is a 2015 action role-playing fighting game developed by Dimps and published by Bandai Namco Games. It was released in February 2015 for PlayStation 3, PlayStation 4, Xbox 360, Xbox One, and Microsoft Windows. It is a spin-off of the Dragon Ball franchise.

A sequel, Dragon Ball Xenoverse 2 was released in 2016.

== Gameplay ==
The game is set almost entirely within a number of 3D areas, which are mostly modeled after notable locations in the Dragon Ball universe, accessed from the main hub – the Toki-Toki City. Fighters can traverse the levels free-roaming in large spaces and can fight on ground, in the air and underwater. The game features spoken dialogue from a majority of main characters while in battle, and characters show facial expressions when they strike an opponent or take damage. Although limited, the players have some freedom to explore the planet Earth as it exists in the Dragon Ball universe along with a handful of other locations, including the aforementioned Toki-Toki City.

Xenoverse is the third Dragon Ball game to feature character creation, the first being Dragon Ball Online and the second being Dragon Ball Z: Ultimate Tenkaichi. Player-created character has the option of becoming an apprentice of the original Dragon Ball characters in order to learn their special moves and access specific costume items. With character customization, players are able to customize their character's race, gender, facial hair, body features, clothing and character's voice effects. There are five available playable races: Saiyans, Namekians, Earthlings, Majins and Frieza's race; all of which have race specific advantages and bonuses as well as shortcomings.

The online multiplayer is accessed from the Toki-Toki City, which serves as a hub where players can form groups and take on cooperative, time-traveling missions.

== Plot ==
Xenoverse features an entirely original story starring the player's custom character. The story itself borrows elements from the Dragon Ball Online MMO, which sees returning villains Towa and Mira manipulating the history of the Dragon Ball universe. Time Patrol Trunks asks Shenron to send him a hero who would help him restore the timeline.

After resolving changes in history during the Saiyan Saga, the Future Warrior is introduced to the leader of the Time Patrol, the Supreme Kai of Time, and her bird, Tokitoki. After resolving more changes in the midst of the Frieza Saga, the Warrior encounters Towa and Mira and engages in a battle with the two, barely defeating Mira. After returning to the Time Nest, The Supreme Kai of Time tells Trunks and the Warrior that Towa is stealing energy to break the seal containing the Demon Realm by manipulating events in history, and that there was a previous attempt to invade the Time Nest that had failed.

The Warrior is sent back to the battle with Frieza and eventually to the Cell Games to resolve further changes in history, culminating in a battle with Towa and Mira. After their defeat, Towa and Mira go to Trunks' original timeline and after manipulating time, Trunks is nearly erased from existence. The Warrior is sent to rescue Trunks from Androids 17 and 18. As she escapes, Towa reveals that she made two changes to the timeline that put Trunks in danger. With no clues as to when the second change occurred, the Warrior is met with a mysterious individual that offers to take them there, which the Player accepts. The Warrior then rescues Trunks from Cell, who had absorbed Trunks' original 17 and 18. Trunks and the Player defeat Cell, and the Warrior returns to the Time Nest.

Shortly after a change in history in the Buu Saga, the Warrior is sent to stop Towa and Mira, destroying Mira in the process and stopping Towa's plans. After successfully defeating Kid Buu, the Supreme Kai of Time discovers and destroys a Majin emblem that the mysterious figure left on the Warrior, identifying the figure as the Demon God, Demigra. The Supreme Kai of Time reveals that Demigra was the previously mentioned invader of the Time Nest and was imprisoned outside of time for 75 million years, but appears to be growing stronger.

After fixing changes to the final battles in the Buu Saga, Demigra then enters the events of Dragon Ball Z: Battle of Gods, attempting to take control over Beerus through his magic, which fails. Beerus and the Warrior fight Demigra together, succeeding in halting Demigra's plans, and Beerus and Whis follow the Warrior to the Time Nest. Shortly after Beerus and Whis depart, Demigra is revealed to have escaped from his prison. The Supreme Kai of Time gathers the Dragon Balls to summon Goku to assist the Warrior with fighting allies and foes that had fallen under Demigra's control.

Demigra then directly enters the Time Nest and consumes Tokitoki before attacking the Warrior. Eventually Goku arrives to assist in the battle, with Goku and the Warrior pursuing Demigra to the Time Vault. However, Demigra successfully defeats the two and destroys the Time Vault. However, the Warrior is sent back to the moment of their defeat by Tokitoki and pursues Demigra to a final battle, where Demigra is destroyed and Tokitoki is saved. Meanwhile, Towa recovers Mira's power core, and promises to restore him to his full strength again.

Some time later, the Time Patrol discover that Demigra had timed attacks with his magic to disrupt history. Manifesting as wormholes, the first change appears during Bardock's assault on Frieza's forces. However, as Bardock is about to be killed by Frieza, he is pulled through a wormhole. As Trunks begins looking for further changes from Demigra's wormholes, he sends the Warrior to the events of Dragon Ball Z: Broly - Second Coming. Broly is eventually pulled through a wormhole as well. It is discovered that Broly (and Bardock) was sent to the events of the destruction of Namek and Goku's fight with Frieza for the sole purpose of killing Goku. However, due to the wish being made by Dende and the Z Fighters, everyone is sent to Earth. Broly is defeated by the combined forces of the Warrior, Bardock, and Vegeta, and the wormhole is destroyed by the explosion of Namek.

=== Downloadable Content ===
Another wormhole is discovered to be altering the events of Dragon Ball GT, which results in Great Ape Baby and Super 17 being consumed by wormholes. The Warrior is eventually sent to the events of the Shadow Dragons Saga, and after defeating Omega Shenron, is consumed by a wormhole alongside Super Saiyan 4 Gogeta and Omega Shenron. They are all deposited in a wasteland alongside Baby and Super 17, with Trunks deducing that the wormholes were created for the express purpose of gathering enemies to finally defeat Goku. However, the three are defeated and Trunks arrives to greet Vegeta and return the three villains to their rightful places. As the Warrior and Trunks return, they are treated to a meal made by the Supreme Kai of Time, but not without Trunks warning about the Supreme Kai's cooking.

== Development ==
Dragon Ball Xenoverse is the first game developed by Dimps to feature full 3D battles, similar to Spike's Budokai Tenkaichi and Raging Blast series. It was first announced as the Dragon Ball New Project, until the actual title was revealed on June 10, 2014, during E3 2014.

The 2014 V-Jump #7 issue, in which the game was announced, draws attention to a mysterious figure watching the first battle between Goku and Vegeta from the shadows. With red hair, a scouter, and the Capsule Corporation logo on his sleeve, this character's identity was not clear. However, it was later revealed that this character is in fact a newly created character, confirming the game's character creation feature.

=== Promotion ===
Pre-order releases from participating retailers of the game come with the exclusive Shenron Black Metalcase, Super Saiyan 4 Vegeta as a playable character and two exclusive versions of Frieza Soldier's Battle Suits for the player character. A collector's edition, called the Trunks Travel Edition, which includes a figurine of the character Trunks, has also been announced. Jaco the Galactic Patrolman, a character from the manga Jaco the Galactic Patrolman, a prequel to Dragon Ball, appears as a Japanese pre-order bonus, along with a Master Roshi costume set to customize the player's character with, a Trunks card for Dragon Ball Heroes, and a code that unlocks Trunks in Dragon Ball Z: Dokkan Battle.

=== Release ===
Dragon Ball Xenoverse was originally released on February 5, 2015, in Japan and was slated for release on February 13 elsewhere, before being delayed. Following a two-week delay, it was released on February 24 in North America and February 27 in remaining territories.

== Reception ==
=== Critical response ===
Reception

Aggregate score
Aggregator	Score
Metacritic	PS4: 69/100; XONE: 67/100

Review scores
Publication	Score
Destructoid	4.5/10
Famitsu	30/40
Game Informer	7.5/10
GameRevolution	3.5/5
GameSpot	6/10
GameTrailers	6/10
Hardcore Gamer	3.5/5
HobbyConsolas	80%
IGN	6.7/10
Slant Magazine	3/5
3DJuegos	7.5/10
Atomix	70/100
Vandal	7.2/10

Dragon Ball Xenoverse received "mixed or average reviews". On review aggregating website Metacritic, which assigns a normalized rating in the 0–100 range, the PlayStation 4 version holds the score of 69/100 based on 50 reviews, while the Xbox One version holds 67/100 based on 18 reviews.

Popular Japanese video game magazine Famitsu gave the game an overall score of 30/40 saying that it "isn't without its faults and flaws" noting the repetitiveness of in-game missions and lag in team battles as its main drawbacks, concluding that the game is "aimed at Dragon Ball fans" and it might "appeal to fighting game fans and gamers that love fast action games". IGN gave the game a score of 6.7 out of 10, praising its "true-to-form graphics", unique story and customizable characters while criticizing its "shallow combat" and "unfair missions", noting that the game might appeal to "someone who enjoys anime, fighting, and role-playing games". Hardcore Gamer gave the game a 3.5 out of 5, praising the "create-a-character functionality", game mechanics and multiplayer mode, while criticizing the in-game camera movement and distancing from the established Dragon Ball continuity. GameTrailers gave it a slightly lower score of 6.0, noting the same flaws mentioned by both Famitsu and IGN, such as the "shallow combat" and repetitiveness as well as its potential appeal to mainly the franchise's established fan base rather than general audience while also noting that "those without such a strong attachment to the franchise may not be able to stomach the compromise."

GameSpot also gave the game a score of 6 out of 10, praising its detailed character customization system and a "new, interesting take on a tired story" while also criticizing its loose controls, repetitiveness and unbalanced gameplay. Destructoid gave it a score of 4.5 out of 10 or "below average", stating that it "has some high points, however they soon give way to glaring faults". While giving praise for the game's fighting mechanics and aesthetics as well as its similarity to source material, the general game design from balancing issues to repetitiveness is heavily criticized; saying that "Dragon Ball Xenoverse has some of the worst design decisions ever embedded into a video game", going on to conclude that "it certainly has its moments and the core fighting mechanics are great, however the game falls flat in too many other areas to be standout title." The review also specifically noted the lingering online service related technical difficulties and poor performance on certain platforms.

Toonami, during their aired video game review segments, gave the game a more favorable critique, giving it a score of 8 out of 10, stating that compared to the last few Dragon Ball games, Xenoverse "finally got it right" and that it's "a must" for Toriyama fans.

=== Sales ===
As of March 17, 2015, 1.5 million copies have been shipped worldwide. The game was the second best-selling for PlayStation 4 on PlayStation Store for the month of February 2015, behind Dying Light. In April 2015, Bandai Namco Entertainment announced that more than 2.5 million copies had been sold. In February 2016, Bandai Namco Entertainment announced that a total of 3.13 million copies had been shipped worldwide. As of July 2018, Dragon Ball Xenoverse and Xenoverse 2 have collectively shipped over 10 million units worldwide.

== Sequel ==
On May 17, 2016, Bandai Namco announced a sequel titled Dragon Ball Xenoverse 2 for PlayStation 4, Xbox One, and Microsoft Windows. It was released for said consoles and Steam in October 2016, and for the Nintendo Switch on September 22, 2017.
