= Mary Mary Mary =

Japanese YouTube channel

- Marimarimarī (マリマリマリー)
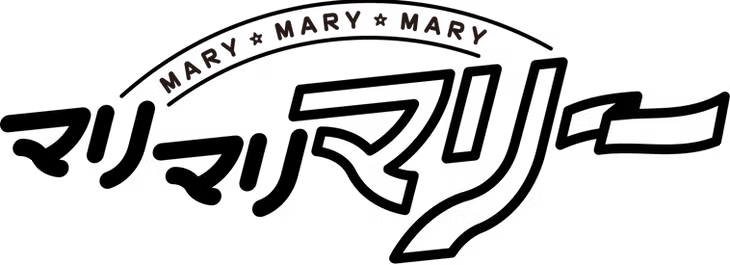
- Logo

TikTok information
- Page: マリマリマリー
- Years active: 2020–present
- Genres: Animation; comedy
- Followers: 258.4 thousand

YouTube information
- Channel: マリマリマリー
- Years active: 2020–present
- Genres: Animation; comedy
- Subscribers: 1.77 million
- Views: 983.61 million
- Last updated: June 27, 2026
- Website: marymarymary.store

Mary Mary Mary (Japanese: マリマリマリー, Hepburn: Marimarimarī; stylized in all caps) is a Japanese YouTube channel and TikTok account focusing on animated comedy sketches. It was launched in August 2020 by writers Shinki Fukami and Ryosuki Sakamoto and illustrated by Morisaki Shin'ya. Videos are edited by Masahiro Yanagi. By June 2026, the channel had over 1.7 million subscribers.

The sketches feature short animated videos about the daily lives of the four main characters of the channel, with the theme "nostalgic illustrations" and "surreal dialogues".

== History ==
The channel was comedy writer Shinji Fukami's idea when he wanted to do a comedy sketch, but he lacked the skills to be a performer. During that time, animated videos were going viral on YouTube with channels like Hajimemashite Matsuo Desu. He decided to create a YouTube channel combining comedy sketches and illustrations. Fukami contacted his former classmate, YouTube and television writer Ryosuke Sakamoto on Instagram, and they talked together from May to June 2020 about starting to create animated comedy sketches together. Before finalizing the project, they looked for illustrators and found Morisaki Shin'ya. Shin'ya initially hesitated, but eventually accepted the offer.

It was launched in August 2020 in both YouTube and TikTok. A video by the channel went viral on TikTok, which made the channel popular in September 2020. Fukami and Sakamoto initially edited the videos, but due to the popularity of the channel following the viral video, they consulted Hirayama, the president of K-Contents, and Masahiro Yanagi joined as an editor. K-Contents then took over the operations of the channel. The channel reached 1 million subscriber in March 2022.

== Content ==
The theme of the channel was "nostalgic illustrations" and "surreal dialogues". The skits were described by Real Sound as an "imbalance of retro and stylish illustrations and the content dealing with current events and trends". The illustrations were depicted as "city pop style". According to Shin'ya, his art style was inspired by 1980s to 1990s anime and manga such as Ranma 1/2, Urusei Yatsura and Sailor Moon. Although, he said that he does not intentionally wanted to create a "retro" and "city pop" style, adding that he just wanted to look "cute" on people.

The videos feature the short sketch about the daily lives of Reiji, Kaname, Sumi, and Mizuki. According to Fukami, they often use common tropes as a setup and then subvert them. Their target demographics are young people.

They also collaborated with professional voice actors such as Natsuki Hanae.

== Production ==
Fukami and Sakamoto meet 2–3 times per week to discuss and brainstorm ideas for videos and typically write three scripts. They then commissioned artists for the illustration and recorded voice-overs. The voice actors are credited as "ordinary people" and not named. But it was eventually revealed in an interview with Shukan Gendai that Reiji and Kaname were voiced by Sakamoto and Fukami, respectively.

== Reception ==
Kansou of Real Sound praised the channel's illustration adding that the illustrations are "reminiscent of the works of Katsuhiro Otomo, Rumiko Takahashi, and Izumi Matsumoto" and it "feels fresh now more than ever". He also commented on the voice acting, adding that the "somewhat monotone delivery, and lack of emphasis in their voices match the art style perfectly, creating an exquisite atmosphere". While Tatsuya Hasebe said that Mary Mary Mary's unique charm lies in the elaborate and emotionally resonant illustrations created by illustrator Morisaki Shin'ya. ModelPress said that the "production technique adopted due to the low budget unexpectedly resonated with viewers." Rei Miyahara of Netorabo praised the channel for its humor and its "lighthearted animations".

== See also ==
- Original net animation
- Web series
