= Mark Britten =

American comedian

- Born: Arlington, Texas, U.S.
- Other name: The Chinaman
- Occupation: Comedian

Mark Britten is an American comedian from Arlington, Texas whose chosen stage name is "The Chinaman". Born of a Chinese-American mother and a Caucasian father, his act employs material from his "dysfunctional background" and skews ethnic stereotypes of all kinds. He has been a performing stand-up comic for ten years, and is known for his voice impersonations, parodies of rock singers and other vocalists and biting anecdotes about the foibles of ethnic and cultural stereotypes. The Austin Chronicle describes him as "a rock star trapped in a comic's body."

== Film, TV and radio ==
Britten has appeared on A&E's An Evening at the Improv (1992 and 1994), NBC's Friday Night (1995), and was the voice of several characters of the anime English dub in Dragon Ball (2001) (Korin) and Dragon Ball Z (1999–2001) (Oolong, Burter, Korin, Ox King, Moori, Grand Kai, Bubbles, Gregory, and the Otherworld Tournament Announcer). Most of his roles in Dragon Ball series however were later recast and re-dubbed over by other voice actors from Funimation in the remastered season box sets. Christopher Sabat got Burter, Korin, Moori, and Bubbles. The Otherworld Announcer went to Brandon Potter. Bradford Jackson and Kyle Hebert have respectively voiced Oolong and Ox King. Gregory's voice is now done by John Burgmeier. Finally, Malaka is now voiced by Chris Cason. The only role he has retained so far is Grand Kai.

He has also appeared on the nationally syndicated The Bob & Tom Show, where his impressions of California Governor Arnold Schwarzenegger are favorites with the hosts. His impersonation of Schwarzenegger is rated 42nd on XM Radio's list of the top 150 comedy routines, and he has performed at over 250 colleges and universities across the United States.

His musical impersonations in his act range from Dave Matthews and Garth Brooks through to AC/DC, Matchbox Twenty, the B-52's and Aerosmith's Steven Tyler. He is noted for his material "mocking his Chinese heritage" and his act lampoons ethnic and cultural stereotypes of all kinds. His act includes a character named Kid Wok and a characterization of Fu Manchu and he has released a CD entitled Dis-Oriented Chinaman and a DVD entitled The Chinaman: This Ninja's Crazy.

On July 3, 2009, Chinaman's new show opened in Las Vegas. After running for several months, the show closed.

Britten is a member of the American Federation of Television and Radio Artists.
