= Dragon Ball Online =

2010 video game

- Developers: NTL Inc. Bird Studio / Shueisha
- Publishers: KOR: CJ Internet Corporation; CHN: Shanda Games; JP: Namco Bandai Games; TWN: Cayenne Tech; HKG: Cayenne Tech
- Director: Koji Takamiya
- Designer: Akira Toriyama
- Composer: Yuzo Koshiro
- Series: Dragon Ball
- Engine: RenderWare
- Platform: Microsoft Windows
- Release: KOR: February 4, 2010; TWN: June 15, 2011; HKG: September 8, 2011
- Genre: MMORPG
- Mode: Multiplayer

Dragon Ball Online (ドラゴンボールオンライン, Doragon Bōru Onrain; Korean: 드래곤볼 온라인) was a massive multiplayer online role-playing game being developed in Japan and South Korea by NTL, set in the Dragon Ball universe. Dragon Ball Online takes place on Earth, 216 years after the events of Goku's departure.

A beta testing of Dragon Ball Online was announced on March 10, 2007, in South Korea, but was delayed until January 2010. NTL Director Koji Takamiya stated in numerous interviews that he would like to see a global release for the game. On September 26, 2013, the Korean servers of the game were shut down and on October 31, 2013, the Hong Kong and Taiwan servers of the game were shut down.

On May 21, 2014, a new website titled the Dragon Ball Z New Project was up and running. The website presented a picture of Goku and three screenshots. On July 10, 2014, the project was given a name titled Dragon Ball Xenoverse.

== Story ==
The events of Dragon Ball Online take place in the age 1000. The game's villains are Mira and Towa, original characters who are created exclusively for the game. Mira and Towa hail from the Demon Realm and are attempting to invade the Earth, with the help of Frieza's army and the Red Ribbon Army, but currently has their eyes set on the past by way of time travel. The purpose for them wanting to go back in time is so that Mira can attempt to obtain Goku's DNA which he will then use to strengthen himself for when he invades the Earth in the future. Currently, all known henchmen of the Time Breakers have been under the effect of mind control. Mind-controlled victims are characterized by a green gem marked with an "X" that rests in their forehead (in some cases it may be in their chest or could also be a mask instead of a gem).

The player takes the role of a character from an unknown time period who is sucked through a crack in time caused by Mira's army. Eventually, the player makes their way to the age 1000 (with the help of the Time Patrol Capsule and Trunks) and throughout the game, the player will be able to travel through different time periods to alter the past and fix the present. All of the events that the player witnesses in the Age 1000 currently only take place on the planet Earth. Both the Majin and Namekian race start their journeys, just like the Humans, on Earth. The new planet Namek was destroyed by Mira in the year 853 and sections of the Earth have since been transformed to resemble the planet Namek.

== Gameplay ==
Players control a character avatar, which will be viewing the HUD from a third-person perspective, within a persistent game world, where they will be able to explore the landscape, search for the Dragon Balls, train to compete in the Tenkaichi Budokai, aspiring to become like the warriors of legend, as well as interact with NPCs and other players. As in most MMORPGs, players will be able to obtain money and experience which will allow them to level up and obtain new abilities. Players may also participate in "Time Machine Quests", in which they will receive guidance from Time Patrol Trunks (タイムパトロールトランクス, Taimu Patorōru Torankusu), in order to travel back in time and take part in notable aspects of the Dragon Ball history.

=== The Earthling classes ===
Of the three races, the Earthlings have the longest established culture on Earth, and they're also the most prolific, having spread to all corners of the world, including the Wastelands. As of Age 1000, the Earthlings have become cross-bred with the Saiyan race, and as such, many believe that they hold a powerful, hidden potential, due to their part Saiyan blood. In Age 820, the remnants of the Frieza Army invaded Earth; the war and environmental destruction have given the Earthlings an intense drive to protect the planet.

Earthlings in the year 1000 are well aware of advanced fighting techniques. This is all thanks to Son Gohan, who published the book "Groundbreaking Science" around Age 800, presumably introducing concepts such as Ki control to the general public and ushering in a worldwide revolution in martial arts. If the Earthling player collects all Dragon Balls, he or she will be able to wish for the ability to turn into any Super Saiyan.

There were three different kinds of Earthlings the player could choose to play the game, one of which was never released. Each one has its own attacks and techniques:

- Martial Artist (武道家, Budoka) - Fighters who specialize in martial arts, comparable to characters like Yamcha and Krillin. After the players reach level 30 they can become either a Swordmaster or a Fighter AKA Polemaster, in which case they will learn skills using a sword or a polearm, respectively.
- Spiritualist (気功家, Kikoka) - Mystics who specialize in spiritual techniques, like Chiaotzu and Tien. The level 30 Master classes are Crane Hermit and Turtle Hermit.
- Engineer - "Mechanics and inventors who build weapons and utilize technology, much like Bulma and her dad." This class was announced but was never implemented into the game. If the class was added to the game, the level 30 masterclasses would have include Gun Maniac and Mech Maniac.

=== The Namekian race and classes ===
After the Namekians homeworld, Planet Namek, was destroyed, they migrated to New Namek. However, that was attacked by Miira in Age 853, forcing them to move yet again. They settled on Earth, primarily around "Porunga Rocks", a region that was terraformed to resemble Namek. They now work on behalf of Kami-sama Dende to prevent Miira from causing global destruction. Unlike other races, Namekians are genderless and reproduce asexually.

There are two different kinds of Namekian the player can choose to play the game. Each one has its own attacks and techniques:

- Dragon Clan (龍族, Ryuzoku) - Namekian Dragon Clansmen are the Namekians born into the Dragon Clan, who have the ability heal others and to create and control shenlongs. The Dende Priests follow the teachings of Kami-sama Dende, who is regarded as the greatest spiritual teacher in Namekian history, and emphasize healing and strengthening their allies. Poko Priests, on the other hand, vomit eggs that hatch into demon shenlongs called Pokopen, which they can control. The level 30 masterclasses include Poko Priest and Dende Priest.
- Warrior (戦士, Senshi) - Warrior-type namekians that follow the teachings of the legendary Namekian warrior, Piccolo, and they fall into two categories Makai Warriors and Madou Warriors. Makai Warriors follow Piccolo's teachings, while the Madou Warriors are those who have reinterpreted Piccolo's teachings to develop a new style. The level 30 masterclasses include Dark Warrior and Shadow Knight.

=== The Majin race and classes ===
After Goku left to train Uub, Mr. Buu and Mr. Satan won the 28th Tenkaichi Budokai by cheating and remained undefeated through the 29th and 30th. However, after a while, Mr. Buu became envious of the humans and the close relationships they had with their sweethearts. In Age 790, Buu accidentally found and read Mr. Satan's copy of "Bob and Margaret", a controversial adult book, in his library. He began to study it in order to create a "Female Buu" that would be just his type. With the name Buuby in mind, he removed part of his body and molded it into a wife for himself, then finished by hitting her with a Love Beam, causing her to give birth to a "Baby Buu". From then on the population grew like wildfire, and, in time, the descendants of Buu were recognized worldwide as the Majin race. The death of Majin Mani Mani, who fought against Frieza's army, inspired the rest of the Majin race to become fighters, and also to alleviate people's hearts on a theme park created by Mr. Bii, the blind boy who was healed by Buu several years prior. They're optimistic and joyful people who dedicate themselves to making "fun days" for others, though they can become dangerous when they're angry or confused. They stand against Mira in order to create a more pleasant Earth.

There are two different kinds of Majin the player can choose to play the game. Each one has its own attacks and techniques:

- Wonder Majin (異魔人, Imajin) - The Wonder Majin are majin that at some point experienced the corrupting influence of sin. They're aggressive and develop fighting techniques capable of really hurting their enemies. The level 30 masterclasses include Plasma Majin and Karma Majin.
- Mighty Majin (大魔人, Daimajin) - The Mighty Majin has a natural gift for uplifting the spirits of those around them and are also able to reduce the impact of enemy attacks with their soft bodies. They can become Ultimate, musicians who enjoy fighting and rally their friends with songs, or Grand Chef, chefs who torment their enemies with a mischievous and fattening fighting style and use maces that resemble foods. The level 30 classes include Grand Chef Majin and Ultimate Majin.

== Release ==
Dragon Ball Online was released in February 2010 in South Korea.

Several unlicensed English emulations are in development. There are multiple notable projects: Dragon Ball Online Galaxy, Dragon Ball Online Universe Revelations, Dragon Ball Online Global, and others, each with its own differences and goals.
