= Fangoria (disambiguation) =

Fangoria is an American magazine devoted to horror and exploitation films, which has a number of associated brands:

- Fangoria Comics
- Fangoria Films
- Fangoria Radio

Fangoria may also refer to:

- Fangoria (band), a Spanish electro pop band

== See also ==
- Fangoria Blood Drive, short-form horror film contest
- Fangoria's Weekend of Horrors
