= Bryan Massey =

American actor (born 1971)

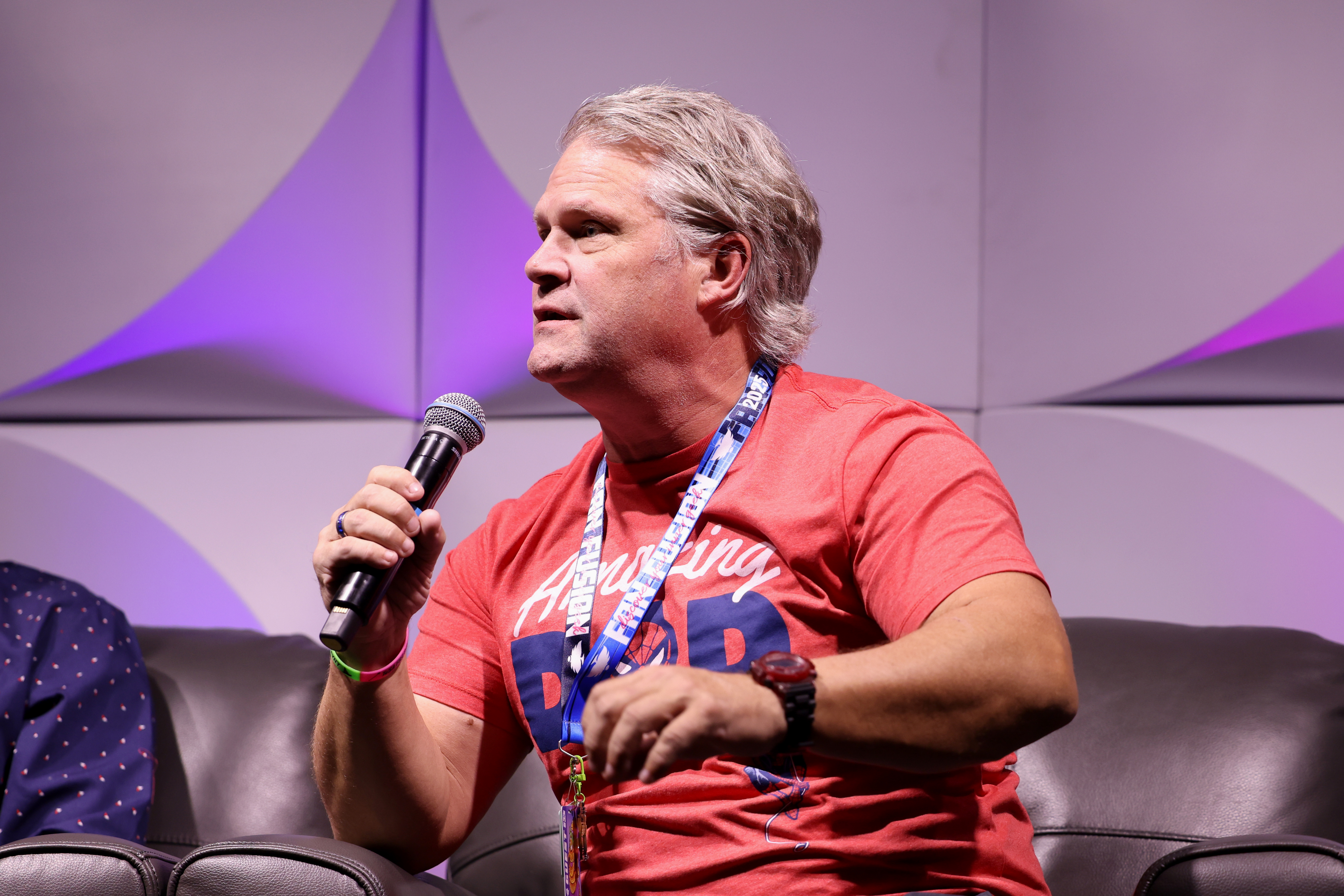
- Massey in 2025
- Born: Bryan William Massey; June 13, 1971 (age 55); Pontiac, Michigan, U.S.
- Other name: BMass
- Occupation: Actor
- Years active: 1983–present

Bryan William Massey (born June 13, 1971) is an American actor. He is best known for his gravelly voice and sense of humor. He has appeared in numerous movies, TV shows, video games and cartoons. He is also the co-creator/co-owner of Galactic Bastards. He voiced Tenshiro Okakura, the club advisor and member of a rebel group known as the Border Military Alliance (BMA) in the anime series Rideback. He has provided hundreds of recognizable voices, including Ladd Russo from Baccano, Tenshiro Okakura in Rideback, Dick Gumshoe in Ace Attorney, Cocytus in Overlord, Oolong in the Funimation dub of the Dragon Ball series, and Wilhelm in Borderlands: The Pre-Sequel. Massey is also known for his role as Tenshiro Okakura in the anime series Rideback.

== Career ==
Bryan Massey began his acting career at the age of 9 when he made the local paper by winning the 5th grade talent show lip-syncing to Steve Martin's "King Tut". In college, Bryan had lead roles in several musicals, participated in community theater, made several short movies with friends on campus, and was a nationally ranked member of the cheer-leading squad. After earning an associate degree in Radio/Television, Bryan decided to pursue his acting career and moved to Hollywood. He got his "Big Break" after being cast as violent psychopath Ladd Russo in the widely successful English dub of Baccano!, for which he won a "Dubby" Award in 2009. Besides his famous roles as Oolong in the Dragon Ball series, Ladd Russo in Baccano and Dick Gumshoe in Ace Attorney, he is also best known for his role as Tenshiro Okakura in the anime series Rideback, based on the manga of the same name. While he is mostly known for his voice work in animated mediums, he has also appeared in many Live-Action Movies and TV series, which began with a small role in the second season of Fox's Prison Break.

== Personal life ==
Bryan Massey was born in Pontiac, Michigan but moved to Dallas, Texas when he was just 7 years old. His first hobbies included filming videos, acting, and playing football, though he ended up quitting football in high school when it conflicted with his theatre schedule. He became engaged to his wife, Page Burkhalter, on November 3, 2010. Together, they have a daughter named Burkley Massey.

== Filmography ==
=== Anime ===
List of English dubbing performances in anime
Year	Series	Role	Notes	Source
2007	My Bride Is a Mermaid	Shark Fujishiro	Funimation Dub	
2009	Baccano!	Ladd Russo		
2009	Gunslinger Girl	Nino Ferreti	Season 2	
2009	Big Windup!	Facilitator, Plate Umpire		
2009	Blassreiter	Franz Juchheim	Ep. 13	
2009	Linebarrels of Iron	Takuro Sawatari		
2009	The Tower of Druaga: The Aegis of Uruk	Big Kusarrak, Kusarakk, Additional Voices	Ep. 13	
2009	El Cazador de la Bruja	Guard A	Ep. 8	
2010	Mnemosyne	Head Thug	Ep. 1	
2010	Bamboo Blade	Shinaider	Eps. 20–21, 26	
2010	One Piece	Monkey D. Dragon, Kamonegi, Drake	Funimation Dub	
2010	Fullmetal Alchemist: Brotherhood	Isaac McDougal	Ep. 1	
2010	Initial D: Fourth Stage	Aikawa/Man in Evo V		
2010	Dragon Ball Z Kai	Oolong	Saiyan-Cell Saga	
2010	My Bride Is a Mermaid	Shark Fujishiro		
2010	Sengoku Basara: Samurai Kings	Sukeroku	Ep. 13	
2010	Corpse Princess	Detective	Ep. 1	
2011	Crayon Shin-chan	Bill	Funimation Dub	
2011	Rideback	Tenshiro Okakura		
2011-present	Fairy Tail	Kain Hikaru, Jacob Lessio, Kersey, Sharry, Additional Voices		
2011	Darker than Black: Gemini of the Meteor	Lebanon	Season 2	
2011	Phantom ~Requiem for the Phantom~	Wallace Taisa	Ep. 3	
2012	Cat Planet Cuties	Kawasaki (Gay Film Director)	Ep. 3	
2012	Shiki	Isami Maeda	Ep. 13	
2012	Casshern Sins	Green Ogre	Ep. 4	
2012	Shangri-La	Takehiko		
2012	C – Control – The Money and Soul of Possibility	Itaneda (Financial District Taxi Driver)		
2013	Toriko	Zongeh		
2013	Michiko and Hatchin	Wen, Additional Voices	Ep. 17	
2014	Karneval	Ishlar		
2014	Space Dandy	Dolph	Ep. 23	
2015	Noragami: Aragoto	Okuninushi		
2016	D.Gray-man	Jerry		
2016	Tokyo ESP	Rindo Urushiba		
2016	Touken Ranbu: Hanamaru	Yamabushi Kunihiro	Also season 2	
2016	Overlord	Cocytus		
2016	Divine Gate	Hiroto's Father	Ep. 2	
2016	Puzzle & Dragons X	Lance's Dad	Ep. 18	
2016	The Disastrous Life of Saiki K.	Matsuzaki		
2016	91 Days	Nick	Ep. 4	
2016	Trickster	Nemoto	Ep. 3	
2016	World Break: Aria of Curse for a Holy Swordsman	Bernard Sergeyevich Ignashevich	Ep. 9	
2017	Garo: Crimson Moon	Rudra		
2017	ACCA: 13-Territory Inspection Dept.	Rainy	Ep. 6	
2017	18if	Inubosaki	Ep. 9	
2017	WorldEnd	Grick Graycrack		
2017	Star Blazers: Space Battleship Yamato 2199	Doll Bareck, Isami Enomoto		
2017	The Silver Guardian	Laolong	Ep. 11	
2017	All Out!!	Kokuto Kirishima		
2017	Samurai Warriors	Toshiie Maeda	Ep. 2	
2017	Sakura Quest	Oden	Ep. 16	
2017	Blood Blockade Battlefront	Larry	Ep. 3	
2017	Kino's Journey —the Beautiful World— the Animated Series	Older Man	Ep. 6	
2018	Hakyu Hoshin Engi	Ko Hiko	SimulDub	
2018	High School DxD Hero	Ladora Bune		
2018-2019	Legend of the Galactic Heroes: Die Neue These	Ovlesser	Also season 2	
2018	Ace Attorney	Dick Gumshoe		
2018	Black Clover	Rades Spirito	Ep. 27	
2018	That Time I Got Reincarnated as a Slime	Myrd		
2018	Tokyo Ghoul:re	Matsuri Washuu		
2018	A Certain Magical Index III	Saigo	Ep. 1	
2018	Dances with the Dragons	Largonkin, Additional Voices		
2018	Double Decker! Doug & Kirill	Sam Purcelli	Ep. 1	
2018	The Master of Ragnarok & Blesser of Einherjar	Jörgen	Ep. 2	
2018	Full Metal Panic! Invisible Victory	Wilhelm Casper		
2018	Star Blazers: Space Battleship Yamato 2202	Isami Enomoto		
2018	Dragon Ball Super	Oolong (Tournament of Power Saga)	Ep. 89	
2019	Fairy Gone	Beevee Liscar		
2019	My Hero Academia	Kyotoku Jiro, Crimson Riot		
2019	Magical Girl Spec-Ops Asuka	Rico		
2019	Wise Man's Grandchild	Harold Bean	Ep. 5	
2019	Isekai Quartet	Cocytus		
2019	Mix	Eisuke Tachibana		
2019	Endro!	Four Generals D	Ep. 6	
2019	Cop Craft	Kevin Randall	Ep. 10	
2019	Fire Force	Flail		
2019	Dr. Stone	Hagane	Ep. 10	
2019	Stars Align	Shingo's Dad	Ep. 9	
2019	Case File nº221: Kabukicho	Tsujimoto	Ep. 13	
2020	Thermae Romae	Bandit Boss, Detective		
2021	Mars Red	Tokuichi Yamagami		
2023	Reborn as a Vending Machine, I Now Wander the Dungeon	Gorth		
2024	Demon Lord, Retry! R	Aoki		
2024	Trillion Game	Interviewer		
2025	Failure Frame	Gizun		

=== Anime Films ===
List of voice performances in direct-to-video and television films
Year	Series	Role	Notes	Source
2010	Dragon Ball: Curse of the Blood Rubies	Oolong		
2013	One Piece Film: Strong World	Scarlet		

=== Film and television ===
- Boggy Creek – Troy Dupree
- Carried Away – Steve Franklin
- Chase – Hank Lacy
- Dallywood – Bryan
- Drive Angry
- Fangoria Blood Drive – The Driver
- Ghostbreakers – Mass Attack
- In the Land of Fireworks – Tyler
- Mad Money – Detective Brinkley
- Miami Magma – Police Chief Michaels
- Missionary Man – State Police Deputy
- Prison Break – Cop #2 (Season 2, Episode 3)
- Taking Tiger Mountain – Carl Sansom
- The Door – Bill Ryder
- The Familiar – Sam
- The X-Files – Nazi Soldier
- Universal Squadrons – Butcher
- W. – Skeeter
- Year one – New Guard
- Run Hide Fight - Gym Teacher

=== Video games ===
- Borderlands: The Pre-Sequel! – Wilhelm
- Dragon Ball Z: Ultimate Tenkaichi – Hero (Crazy)
- Dragon Ball Xenoverse - Time Patroller
- Dragon Ball Xenoverse 2 - Time Patroller
- Dragon Ball Z: Kakarot - Oolong

== Music ==
Bryan Massey was featured on the 'BLFC: A Musical Tail' album by Foxes And Peppers as a guest singer featured on the tracks 'Buy My Stuff', 'Draw Me In', and 'Hey Buddy'.
