= List of Toriko characters =

This is a list of characters from the manga series Toriko by Mitsutoshi Shimabukuro.

== Main characters ==
=== Toriko ===
Voiced by: Ryōtarō Okiayu (Japanese); Ian Sinclair (anime), Takashi Kondō (VOMIC) (English)

Toriko (トリコ) is a Gourmet Hunter and the title character of the series. He has blue hair and wears an orange vest and short pants. He is one of the Four Heavenly Kings (also The Legendary Four), and his nickname is "The Glutton."

Toriko's hunting rule to only killer animals he is hunting, and to "knock" (immobilize) the rest. When he sees life taken for granted, he goes into a state of untamed rage. His regular technique is called "Fork and Knife" where he forms one of his hands as a claw (fork) and the other in a chop position (knife). His "Spiked Punch" attack is a series (Note: In Toriko's Hit Nail Punch, each of Toriko's punches is called a "fold", so a "five-hit nail punch" is five punches in a row to the same spot.) of punches to the same location that he employs to break through walls or defeat opponents.

He has immunity to 70 different poisons and also has an animal-like sense of smell. He adopts a Battle Wolf's newborn pup and names it Terry.

Toriko has been featured in a crossover TV specials with One Piece's Monkey D. Luffy and Dragon Ball Z's Goku.

It is revealed that Starjun is his brother and his father is none other than the great Gourmet God Acacia and his mother is the Chef Goddess Froese.

=== Komatsu ===
Voiced by: Romi Park (Japanese); Jessie James Grelle (Toriko), Daisuke Kishio (VOMIC) (English)

Komatsu (小松) is a master chef at the Hotel Gourmet, which is part of the IGO (International Gourmet Organization). He is timid, but greatly interested by what he finds in his travels with Toriko. As a result, he tries to overcome his fear and does his best to help. He is a highly skilled and competent chef and has a large knowledge of foods that he knows which foods would work well. He is the only chef in the world who knows the complete recipe of the Century Soup. He keeps a baby Wall Penguin as a pet, which is also a key element of the soup. Toriko decided on Komatsu as the chef in his bishoku-ya and chef combo, which Komatsu accepted, (though Zebra and Sunny have also indicated a desire for Komatsu to form a combo with them). Despite Komatsu's small stature, he has shown remarkable courage in situations in which he might very well be killed. It is also revealed that despite his looks, he and Toriko are of the same age. He is also one of the few people who is able to get along amicably with all four Heavenly Kings. After gaining global recognition for finding a simple method to prepare Yuda's "Medical Cooking Mochi," Komatsu was put into the list of top 100 chefs in the world, ranked at 88.

- Century Soup: This legendary soup causes anyone who eats it to form a silly smile of utter satisfaction. Komatsu manages to recreate it after half of a year of experimentation. He decides not to apply to patent the recipe because the Wall Penguins would become over-hunted.
- Derous Knife: A knife made by Melk II. Using a Derous Fang and Komatsu's broken knife, she made this knife that Komatsu uses to prepare countless dishes, as its sharpness has the potential to reach even legendary ingredients. Due to being created from Komatsu's broken knife, he is able to handle its unbelievable sharpness.
- Food Luck: Apparently Komatsu has the ability to listen to the 'voice' of ingredients, thereby determining their whereabouts and how to prepare them. His Food Luck is so high that he is able to sense extremely hard to find, high-level ingredients instinctively.

== Organizations and Groups ==
=== Four Heavenly Kings ===
==== Coco ====
Voiced by: Takahiro Sakurai (Japanese); Jarrod Greene (TV series) (English)

Coco (ココ, Koko) "The Gentleman" of the "Four Heavenly Kings," is good friends with Toriko. He earns most of his living by working as a fortune-teller, which also makes him extremely popular with women. While Toriko mostly relies on his brute strength, Coco prefers using stealth techniques and strategy to subdue aggressors. He has exceptional vision, where he can see in the dark and can read electromagnetic auras in order to predict a beast's next action. His specialty is poison: he has developed immunity to over 500 different kinds, and with newer poisons, generates antibodies to counter them. He attacks by converting his body fluids into poison and shooting them like projectiles with various dosages.

==== Sunny ====
Sunny (サニー, Sanī)
Voiced by: Mitsuo Iwata (Japanese); Aaron Roberts (TV series) (English)
One of the "Four Heavenly Kings," he is Rin's older brother. He is a calm and collected pretty boy who judges the beauty of people's actions and speaks in an elegant, almost flirting manner. He has a way of knocking without touching the target, mostly related to his "sensor" talent which allows him to know the physical state of those around him. His sensor is actually thousand upon thousands of super thin hairs with incredible strength and maneuverability. Although the individual hairs are very strong and no Human World creatures can cut them, if his hairs are cut, he feels a sense of pain equal to pulling a tooth for each hair. Sunny has developed techniques to manage the pain so it does not overwhelm him. Since mastering "Food Honor" at Shokurin Temple, the total number of "sensors" or "feelers" he can control is 1,000,000 and the range of his feelers is 300 meters. Sunny's body has a very high body temperature and powerful sense of touch, being touched by his hair or any part of his body can only be described as Sunny tasting whatever he is touching. He seeks "harmony" in his dishes, defined as the perfect use of ingredients, perfect handling of the food, and most importantly producing the perfect taste. He also expresses a great sense of disgust towards the Bishoku-kai, displaying anger after seeing the slaughtered creatures without a bite taken out of them that followed a GT Robo's path of destruction. Sunny has an animal partner, a juvenile Mother Snake named Quinn. He and the other Four Heavenly Kings were trained by Ichiryū, the president of the IGO. The Heavenly King who Sunny gets along with the least is Zebra as his appearance and brutal behavior disgusts him.

Hunting Method: Sunny hunts by using his hair to capture his prey. He can also use it to stop and counter enemy attacks.

- Intimidation: Like most of the other hunters, including the other kings, Sunny uses a form of intimidation to scare an enemy into surrender. However, because of his love of beauty Sunny only uses intimidation when his foe has truly disgusted him, such as when he encounters the GT Robo responsible for taking a single bite out of the creatures of an area and leaving them to rot. His intimidation is the creation of an evil spirit out of his hair, which also makes his intimidation the only one openly visible and not just sensed by killing intent.

==== Zebra ====
Zebra (ゼブラ, Zebura)
Voiced by: Kenji Matsuda (TV series)
Described by Toriko as the most powerful of the "Four Heavenly Kings" for his pure destructive capabilities, Zebra is a very large and well-built man with scars that cover most of his body, one of the more striking ones being the half Glasgow smile on the left side of his face. His personality is very angry and small-tempered, he enjoys fighting the most out of all the Heavenly Kings and has a self-professed hatred for anyone or anything acting "cocky". He is incredibly strong, and until recently, he was held in "Honey Prison" for eating 26 species of beasts to the point of extinction. He and the other Four Heavenly Kings were trained by Ichiryū, the president of the IGO. Zebra has the power to both hear and send out ultrasonic waves, as well as the ability to hear even the faintest sounds from tens of kilometers away. Originally, Zebra did not intend to have a Full Course Menu, preferring to just seek out delicious food around the world and eat it. However, as part of the conditions he made with Komatsu to give his help in obtaining the Mellow Cola, Zebra promised to make a better Full Course Menu than Toriko, and if he did so, Komatsu would have to form a combo with him instead of Toriko.

Hunting Method: Zebra hunts by using his mammoth body and strength, as well as his ability to create massive bursts of "sound", capable of breaking steel and killing animals with one hit. His voice can travel up to 70 kilometers.

=== Gourmet Hunters ===
Zongeh (ゾンゲ)
Voiced by: Tomoyuki Shimura (VOMIC), Wataru Takagi (Japanese); Bryan Massey (TV series) (English)
A very arrogant and annoying Gourmet Hunter who wields a large axe to hunt. Zongeh has straight black hair and a beard, as well as a very ugly face with scars, and a slightly fat, muscled body with lots of body hair. He is very self-centered and boasts about his completed full course menu which is made of dishes that are mostly easy to obtain. Despite all his boasting he is a very big coward using others as shields and making excuses when confront by a beast he can't take down. A running gag is that people forget his name, thinking his name is a zombie or a zombie movie or something else entirely. He's not very knowledgeable in the world of Gourmet Hunters, such as not knowing about National Treasure Setsuno and thinking that the Growlus (Level 13) is the strongest animal in the world. He also seems to confuse real life with the RPGs that he often plays. For the most part, he serves as comedy relief for the series. Around the end of the series, it is revealed that Zongeh possesses one of the largest amounts of Gourmet Luck in the series according to Midora.
Jiro (次郎, Jirō)
Voiced by: Toshiyuki Morikawa (Japanese); Philip Weber (TV series) (English)
"Knocking Master" Jiro is a retired Gourmet Hunter whose Full Course Menu of Life has beasts of immeasurable levels. He initially appears as a small, drink-loving old man with a scraggly white beard on his chin and a ducktail hairstyle, however, he is able to transform into a giant. He carries an assortment of knocking tools in his vest, and is also able to revive and heal people with his tools.

Jiro is the grandfather of the Saiseya Teppei, who has also inherited his Knocking talent. He is one of the three disciples of the legendary Bishoku-ya, Acacia, along with Ichiryū, head of IGO, and the boss of the Bishoku-kai, of the three he is the only one that does not the head of an organization, as well as being the only one in retirement. When Jirō was younger, he had a wild, dangerous personality and had part of his power sealed by Acacia so that he could be taught Knocking and other techniques. In addition to his various Knocking tools, Jirō also has a handheld gauntlet with various spikes coming out of it that he only uses in incredibly serious battles, known as the "Fangs of the Wolf King".

Hunting Method: Jirō uses his mastery of Knocking to paralyze and defeat wild beasts, but can also use Knocking to revive and alter organic tissue. He also has a good amount of physical strength, having a hand chop that feels like an axe chop to Toriko, and is able to freely survive in the Gourmet World, although he has to stop drinking when he enters so he has more focus.

- Intimidation Knocking: Jirō uses Knocking to enlarge his muscles and other tissue to appear like a giant, and then uses "Intimidation" to paralyze beasts and humans alike, like he would with a Knocking gun.
- Knocking Rifle Hard Type: Using a long range, high-difficulty Knocking rifle, Jirō fires at wild beasts and paralyzes them through Knocking. Despite his rifle being described as having a high difficulty, he is proficient enough to fire on hundreds of beasts and paralyze each in one shot.
- Rising Wolf - Guinness Punch: Using his "Fangs of the Wolf King," Jirō punches upward and sends out a large attack in the shape of a wolf upward toward the opponent or target. Jirō claims the attack can reach all the way up into space.
- Grand Knocking: Jirō delivers a strong punch the ground and halts the movement of not only all living things on the planet temporarily(but Joa was able resist it) and slows down very rotation of the planet itself. In the aftermath of this technique, the planet is rocked by massive natural disasters as a result of the Earth's rotation stopping.

=== IGO ===
Ichiryū (一龍)
Voiced by: Kenyu Horiuchi (Japanese); R. Bruce Elliott (TV series) (English)
The President of IGO, he has the appearance of an old man with dark skin and blond hair, along with a long blond mustache. Despite his old age, he is not yet retired, although seems to vacation frequently, spending time on a private island resort. Ichiryū used to be a very powerful Bishoku-ya and is one of the three disciples of the legendary Bishoku-ya, Acacia, along with Jirō and Midora, the boss of the Bishoku-kai. Since then, he trained all of the Four Heavenly Kings personally and considers them his sons. Even in his old age, he is powerful and can defeat Toriko effortlessly in a fight and perform inhuman actions, such as running on water, and is purportedly strong enough to defeat all the members of the Bishoku-kai, with the exception of Midora, single-handedly. In addition to his incredible strength, Ichiryuu has several other abilities that put him far above a human level. He possesses a "gravity" of presence rather than mass, but it still allows him to gradually repel or attract those around him. Ichiryuu is also capable of using the "minority" atoms in his body - those that act in disregard of traditional physics - to do things such as fly or float in mid-air. This is based on a principle that the square root of any atoms in an object will act in this "exceptional" way.

- Chopsticks: Like Toriko's "Fork and Knife" and Chin Chinchin's "Spoon," Ichiryuu uses a utensil-like weapon in order to fight. Unlike those two, however, instead of forming his hand in the shape of "chopsticks," he holds his hand as if he was holding chopsticks " and materialize "chopsticks" out of Appetite Energy. He can produce chopsticks of varying sizes, but they are strong enough to stop powerful Gourmet World beasts and even Midora, the head of the Bishoku-kai.

- Utshiri Bashi: Ichiryuu creates a large number of "chopsticks" in order to grab multiple targets. "Utshiri Bashi" is a Japanese phrase meaning to skip from plate to plate with chopsticks without pausing to eat rice.
- Sashi Bashi: Ichiryuu powerfully jabs with his "chopsticks" at a target. "Sashi Bashi" is a Japanese phrase for pointing at someone or something with one's chopsticks, which is considered impolite.
- Seseri Bashi: Ichiryuu makes several quick jabs with his "chopsticks," which what appears to be a lower level of power than the "Sashi Bashi". "Seseri Bashi" is a Japanese phrase for playing with one's food with one's chopsticks.
- Nigiri Bashi: Instead of holding his "chopsticks" in the traditional way, Ichiryuu can hold them with his full hand like a spear. Using his "chopsticks" this way reduces their accuracy but greatly increases their power. "Nigiri Bashi" is a Japanese phrase for holding chopsticks the way Ichiryuu does with this move, which is considered impolite.
- Chopstick Cannon: After using "Nigiri Bashi," Ichiryuu throws one of his "chopsticks" powerfully at the enemy.
- Disorder Chopsticks: Ichiryuu throws out a volley of "Chopstick Cannons".
- Ougi: Single Chopstick: Seemingly Ichiryuu's finishing move, he uses "Nigiri Bashi" and drops a single "chopstick" powerfully down on an opponent.
- All-Meal King Eating Chopsticks: Ichiryuu's true final move, he throws one massive chopstick directly at the opponent. Contained within that chopstick are actually numerous "Chopstick Cannons" that batter the opponent heavily.

- Minority World: Taking Ichiryuu's control over his "minority atoms" to the extreme, he gives all of the stray "minority atoms" in the area around him power, fundamentally changing the physical properties around him. Solids turn soft, air becomes thick, and most importantly, the atoms inside his opponent's body can stop function as they should. This means that nerve signals are not sent effectively and eventually, organs begin to shut down.

Shigematsu (茂松)
Voiced by: Kōji Ishii (Japanese); Doug Goodrich (TV series) (English)
The Vice-President of IGO, he is a very large, muscular man with a big, black beard and mustache and thick, black hair with a stripe of white hair down the middle. He keeps one eye closed at all times, as well as a nose plug over the bridge of his nose. When these are removed, which he does when preparing to fight Grinpatch, he becomes more beastly and his muscles bulge and his clothes begin to tear. When Grinpatch comes to the First Biotope, he is disappointed that Starjun or Tommyrod had not come, showing not only his delight in fighting, but also his knowledge of the Bishoku-kai. Shigematsu is also secretly a member of NEO against his will, an organization that opposes both the IGO and the Bishoku-kai and ordered the killing of the IGO bureau chiefs and personally attacked Mansam. He is eventually fatally wounded by Toriko with one blow and is freed from Joie's Taste Change and dies as the man he used to be.
Mansam (マンサム, Mansamu; Mansom in anime)
Voiced by: Jūrōta Kosugi (Japanese); Brian Mathis (TV series) (English)
IGO's Development Bureau Director and Gourmet Research Facility Chief, he holds IGO's third position, with authority below the CEO and President. Mansam is a large, muscular man whose bald head is covered in scars and what appears to be the heads of screws. He also has a thin mustache and very thick eyebrows. He is an old friend of Toriko's and has the same body type. He runs IGO's Garden One, a facility where 30% of the world's gourmet foods are made. It also clones long extinct animals and performs selective breeding. He has an incredibly high pain tolerance, able to live through being stabbed in the gut and a hole blown through his throat, and he heals himself by drinking alcohol. Instead of using Knocking to enhance his muscles, like Knocking Master Jiro does, Mansam appears to have sealed away his true strength and uses Knocking to return to his monstrous, muscular, and feral state. When someone says his name he thinks they are calling him handsome; this is a pun as his name sounds similar to the English word "handsome". He seems to be always drunk or just in a really happy state most of the time, only when someone mentions a job that needs doing or when he is gets angry does he change to a more serious manner. When he was younger, Mansam was a part of a large clan of bandits and was considerably more vicious, but after meeting with Ichiryuu, he appears to have reformed his ways.

- Techniques:
- Intimidation: The same as Toriko's and Coco's except Mansam projects the image of an Ashura, with eight arms instead of the six arms.
- Fry Panch: It is a pun on the Japanese "pan" and "punch" being pronounced similarly. The technique is similar to Toriko's Fork and Knife except this is a punch, and the arm is shaped like a frying pan.
- Fry Pan Sandwich: Fry Panch using both hands slams in from opposite sides, hence the "sandwich".
- Wanted Punch: Used when Mansam is in his fully released "Knocked" form, this is a powerful downward punch that has the strength to burst apart even a large, reinforced GT Robo.

Rin (鈴)
Voiced by: Asami Tano (Japanese); Leah Clark (TV series) (English)
A tomboyish pheromone and other odor composition user who acts as a beast handler at the gourmet Coliseum, a fighting ring run by IGO that pits beast against each other to both validate the accuracy of CLVL rankings and as entertainment for world officials, her nickname is "the wild beast tamer". Rin has short black hair and a scar on her cheek, which she gave herself trying to replicate Toriko's three scars, but stopped at one when she saw she put them on the wrong side. As indicated by her desire to replicate his scars, she has a crush on Toriko, and blushes whenever he talks to her (even if he just says her name) or does something kind. After Toriko's return from the Gourmet World, Rin and Toriko become engaged after Toriko accepts her marriage proposal. She is the younger sister of one of the Four Heavenly Kings, Sunny. She has also been implanted with Gourmet Cells.
Pheromones are how she handles beasts. She uses two wrist-mounted gas sprayers to shoot pheromones as well as control their level of dilution.

- Battle Fragrance: Derived from the Battle Flower on an island where battle never ends, the flower affects the animal's central nervous system making them violent while at the same time stimulating the body into its peak form, because of this it is also called the "doping flower".
- Super Relaxing Fragrance: Created from the pheromones of the Nikoniko Manatee, it relaxes nervous female manatee during mating season. The pheromone has been adapted by humans and is used in animal therapy.
- Endorphin Smoke: A smoke laced with a high endorphin, use is restricted by law.
- Thunder Peppermint: Rin's strongest scented fragrance, it is concentrated menthol taken from dried peppermint leaves; the scent is compared to that of lightning. One sniff is enough to keep one awake for five days.
- Devil Durian Fragrance: The fragrance exploits the extract of the "Devil Durian". Its stench is powerful enough to repel bugs to up to half a kilometer radius.

==== Bureaus ====
The IGO, being a massive global organization, is made of up several bureaus to manage all of its affairs. Here are the known IGO Bureaus:

===== IGO Defense Bureau =====
The director of this bureau is Ray, a young man with shoulder-length black hair, eye-shadow on his eyelids, and a long dark robe. Among his duties are taking care of "Nitro" that appear in the Human World.

===== IGO Business Bureau =====
The director of this bureau is Uumen Umeda, a middle aged man with sunglasses and a distinctive 5 'o' clock shadow. He is the one who commissioned Toriko to retrieve the Galala Crocodile in the beginning of the series. Uumen Umeda is also secretly a member of NEO, an organization that opposes both the IGO and the Bishoku-kai and personally killed the other bureau chiefs with his bare hands.

===== IGO Administration Bureau =====
The director of this bureau is Wain, a young man with flat brown hair and glasses. He reports on the damage done to the IGO Biotopes.

===== IGO Financial Affairs Bureau =====
The director of this bureau is Buru, an older man with many scars and a mustache.

==== =IGO Public Relations Bureau ====
The director of this bureau is Naroid, a black man in a business suit.

===== IGO Judicial Affairs Bureau =====
The director of this bureau is Glass, a middle-aged man with a dark burn covering part of his face. He oversees the gourmet police, although when Ichiryuu and Yosaku went to Honey Prison, also overseen by the Judicial Affairs Bureau, he calls Glass useless for not being able to get Zebra released.

Honey Prison Warden Love
Voiced by: Naoko Matsui (TV series)
The warden of the Gourmet Prison "Honey Prison", she is a very small old woman who wears a bee costume. She is feared by all the prisoners and guards in Honey Prison and she has trained and tamed several extremely powerful beasts. Love is able to freely control her pheromones, to do things like attract the opposite sex to taming the Execution Beasts found in the prison. However, the only person her pheromones appears to not affect is Zebra, whom she has fallen in love with. In order to allow Zebra to be discharged from prison, she stipulates that he must capture 500 high-level gourmet prisoners and discover 100 new ingredients. Love is also a member of the IGO's "0th Biotope," located in the Gourmet World.
Assistant Warden Oban
The assistant warden at Honey Prison, an extremely large man with red skin, fangs, as well as stitches and bolts covering his face. He has the appearance of typical portrayals of the devil.
Guard Captain Pricom
The captain of the guard at Honey Prison, a gourmet prison under the management of the Judicial Affairs Bureau. He has an eye patch, several scars, and gold teeth as well as a unique hairstyle that is half afro, half straight, with the top of his head being bald.
Receptionist Chupali
The receptionist at Honey Prison, a large man with a large beard, black teeth, and a large hat that obscures his eyes. He has the appearance of typical portrayals of Enma.

==== 0th Biotope ====
The 0th Biotope is one of the IGO's Biotopes for studying ingredients, but it is kept secret from the rest of the world and is located in the Gourmet World. The 0th Biotope is staffed by 17 private citizens from all around the world, all hand selected by the IGO's president, Ichiryuu. Among the tasks undertaken by the 0th Biotope is the collection of Acacia's "Full Course" ingredients, as well as monitoring the Nitro beasts and fighting the Bishoku-kai. All members of the 0th Biotope have their own individual jobs as well.

The members of the 0th Biotope include: Yosaku, Ryuu, Chin Chinchin, and Love. They also include:

Melk the First
Voiced by: Hiroshi Naka (TV series)
A master craftsman, responsible for the high-quality "Melk Knives". He is reportedly very strong, testing his knives on wild animals and living at the top of a large mountain, the steps to which he carved out himself. He was the one to discover the ultimate grindstone, the "Melk Stardust", which when used to sharpen knives, produces the Golden Powder, a seasoning of incredible savoriness that creates a new form of amino acid. He has been living on the lowest level of the "Heavy Hole" for the past six years working for the 0th Biotope. Around the world, Melk is rumored to be a seclusive and quiet person, but in fact, he is a cheerful, talkative person who just has an incredibly quiet voice. It was because of this that Toriko could not understand anything he was saying when they first met, only through the use of a special stone that he recently discovered that his voice is able to be heard. The near-muteness of his voice made Melk the Second wonder how he cared for her. One of his main jobs as a member of the 0th Biotope, and his last job as a professional sharpener, was to craft a knife capable of preparing Acacia's Salad course, "AIR," which Melk has recently completed.
Guemon
Guemon's job is to guard the Human World on the Three-Way Road on the Wak continent, one of the few "Land Routes" that link the Human World with the Gourmet World. Guemon is the only person who lives there, and he stops powerful beasts from the Gourmet World from making their way into the Human World. Guemon is a bishokuya and he is called the "Gourmet Gang Leader", in part because his clothes are like that of a stereotypical Japanese gangster "banchou", with a long, tattered black school jacket, with a white bandana, Duck's Tail haircut, and a haramaki. Instead of using his consciousness when fighting, Guemon uses "intuition" in order to fight, sensing when and where to attack, and with great power. However, this has left Guemon with a bad habit of spacing out when talking with people, although when he is not spaced out, he talks and laughs loudly. Guemon is also armed with a katana. Sani, as part of his training to enter the Gourmet World, went to visit Guemon, learning his skill of "intuition".
Rapp
A very large man, around the same height as Zebra, Rapp is a bishokuya and is one of the younger members of the 0th Biotope, but still has enough power, according to Mansam, to defeat the Four Heavenly Kings. Rapp wears a large helmet on his head with goggles that cover most of his face, as well as a blue and yellow track suit and black gloves. Among Rapp's duties appears to be handling the bodies of "Nitro" creatures, and carries a large suitcase with tools that help him examine or remove "Nitro".
Malisman
A dark skinned woman with long pink hair covering one eye, she is referred to as a "Gourmet Literary Master," and is one of the four "Gourmet Living National Treasures".
Malee
A man in a plain yukata with very short black hair and a carefully shaped beard, Malee is described as a "Knocking artisan". His knocking appears to be based on his mastery of "Seitei," a form of Eastern physical therapy that includes osteopathy, massage, and chiropractic methods.
Kuribou
A very large, overweight man with a short beard and top-knot style hair, Kuribou is a world-famous pot artisan. He wears large, pot-like armor and is somewhat lackadaisical in his attitude and behavior. Kuribou is also a double agent for the IGO within Neo, an organization that opposes both the IGO and the Bishoku-kai. He's also extremely loyal to the IGO, as Ichiryuu even trusted him to rat out another member of the 0th Biotope Ichiryuu suspected of being a spy.

- Gimmick Frying Pan: Kuribou uses a substitution move to direct an opponent's attack to one of his pans, which is incredibly durable.

Manan
A bishokuya, Manan wears a flashy, stage-magician type of suit, as well as blue hair that sticks up in a partial mohawk. He also has a long mustache and yellowish skin. Manan is known as the "Gourmet Magician," and his skill as a magician is evidenced by him being able to pour liquid into a semi-solid column resting on top of a glass.
Tack
A very large muscular man with dark skin, Tack is a bishokuya and a member of the "Goro tribe". He has dreadlocks as well as a feathered headrest, face tattoos, multiple large ear piercings, war paint, and a fur vest, creating the look associated with aboriginal American and Australian people. Tack also has two large scars on his chest and carries some kind of staff. He also laments having to fight the Bishoku-kai, considering fighting over food to be foolish.
Goblin Ramon
A "Gourmet Mountain Bandit," Ramon is a tall, lanky elderly man with pink-red skin and long red hair in a ponytail and a long mustache, as well as razor sharp teeth. When the 0th Biotope was told that they may have to go to war with the Bishoku-kai, he was excited at the prospect of being morally justified in killing.
Sakura
Sakura is a young-looking man with a winged skull headrest and spiky black hair. He is a bishokuya, but is also described as a "martial artist". When Grinpatch told Toriko about the bishokuyas who were pursuing "God," Sakura was one of the individuals shown.
Megarodras
An assassin, Megarodras wears black and green-fringed armor, as well as a dark, spiked helmet that covers most of his face.
Rala
Rala is a very large and muscular man with short black hair and a small mustache, as well as a monocle that he never takes off. As well as being a bishokuya, Rala is also a "Gourmet Astronomer," who has been tracking the progress of the "Gourmet Eclipse," which will herald the return of "God". By Rala's estimations, the "Gourmet Eclipse" is half a year away from the 0th Biotope summit that takes place during the series. Aside from tracking the "Gourmet Eclipse," Rala makes many other calculations, including the actions of the Bishoku-kai and the awakening of dangerous "Human World" beasts.
Kousairou
Kousairou is a very old man with very dark skin and a long face with a long, white beard and mustache. He wears a robe and has thin, white tassels around him at all times. He is described as a "Gourmet Hermit," and his job as a member of the 0th Biotope is to locate Acacia's "Drink" course, "ATOM". Kousairou left the 0th Biotope to attend the "Cooking Fest" to prevent the Bishoku-kai from kidnapping chefs. However, Kousairou is secretly a member of NEO, an organization which opposed both the IGO and the Bishoku-kai, so while there, he has collaborated in secret with other NEO members to take advantage of the battle between the IGO and Bishoku-kai.

- Food Technique - Calorie Consumption: By placing a talisman on someone, Kousairou saps them of their energy - up to 10 million kilocalories.

Atashino
Atashino is the 0th Biotope's chef, whose job is to cook Acacia's "Full Course Menu". Atashino is also a "Gourmet Surgeon," and she is always wearing pink medical equipment, including a stethoscope and a surgical mask.

==== Gourmet Seven ====
The seven "Taste Masters" chosen from the chief member nations of the IGO are an organization of members who hold a miraculous sense of taste, said to be able to recognize the taste of a single grain of sugar in a twenty-five meter pool. They take part in important decisions of the gourmet age, such as assigning the number of stars to hotels and restaurants and the rank of cooks. They also serve as inspectors for the IGO.

Mr. Patch
Voiced by: Hideyuki Umezu (Japanese); Ed Blaylock (English)
The first G7 member revealed, he goes to Komatsu's hotel when he hears a rumor of the completed Century Soup. He is assertive but not forceful; he comes to taste the soup and is surprised that Komatsu declines to serve it. He asks if there were customers before him and sees the customers (consisting of Toriko and several other important people); he does not press the matter and says he will come back at a later time. He does show concern since Komatsu completing the Century Soup would spread his name world wide, and recommends that Komatsu have "Bodyguard" from now on, to protect him from being taken by the "Nitro", which kidnap and eat prominent Human World chefs. After recognizing the taste of the Century Soup later on, he raises Hotel Gourmet's star level from five to six.
Mr. Appalon
The second G7 member revealed, he judges the Surprise Levels of Surprise Apples and has an odd habit of speaking, emphasizing the sound of the letter E.

=== Bishoku-kai ===
Bishoku-kai (literally: Beautiful Food Organization, Gourmet Corps. in the English Dub), a rival organization to the IGO, their headquarters are Castle Shokuyokubō (Appetite's Desire) located in the Forest of Sorrow, "Thorn Wood". The dining kitchen for the Bishoku-kai is on top of a large stone arc, accessible only by flying beast, and the remains from ingredients used in cooking fall below into the ocean to such an extent that they've created a new island of rotting food known as the "Dust Zone". The Bishoku-kai also has a Gourmet World headquarters, which is on top of a tall stone spire and is surrounded by wild beasts. This headquarters is also equipped with a kitchen where enslaved chefs are brought to prepare food for Midora, who lives in the Gourmet World headquarters. The Bishoku-kai serve as the main antagonists for the first half of the series, being replaced by NEO during the second half. After the Cooking Festival arc, Bishoku-kai has been essentially crippled, with most of its members either dead or having joined with NEO.

Midora
Voiced by: Masaki Terasoma (Japanese); Patrick Seitz (TV series) (English)
The leader of the Bishoku-kai and the main antagonist for the first half of the series. Midora has three scar-like birth marks over both of his eyes, wavy, dark hair the length of his body, and a beard that sticks out on his chin and on both sides of his jaw. He has an insatiable appetite, which comes from when he grew up in crippling poverty as a child and never had enough to eat. He is extremely powerful, as he resides in the Gourmet World, and after drinking the legendary Century Soup, Alfaro notices that the increase in his Gourmet Cells is comparably small to the rest of his body. He appears to have the ability to move imperceptibly fast, leaving only an after-image that slowly fades away. As further testament to his power, he is the only person who does not smile when drinking the Century Soup. His goal, and therefore the main goal of the Bishoku-kai, is to obtain the ingredient GOD and control all of the world's ingredients. He is one of the three disciples of the great Bishoku-ya Acacia, along with Jirō and Ichiryū. However, unlike Jirō and Ichiryū, he appears to have retained his youth as his appearance is considerably younger than the two. Ichiryū himself even comments that he looks the same from when they were younger.

- Hungry Tongue: Midora's primary battle technique, he is able to make his tongue grow and stretch to incredible sizes and lengths. This "Hungry Tongue" has incredible power, able to obliterate several powerful Gourmet World beasts instantly and tear through large, sturdy islands.

- Tongue of Thorns: Midora produces several of his "Hungry Tongues," but these are also covered in spikes.
- Tongue Shield: Midora collects his various "tongues" together into a powerful shield that can also pull the attacker in and eat them.
- Mountain Tongue: Midora produces a particularly large tongue that can create a strong attack but also guard against lighter attacks due to its size.
- Machine Gun Tongue: Midora's "Hungry Tongue" branches off into dozens of "tongues" that strikes at the target quickly.

- Hungry Space: After using his "Hungry Tongue," Midora creates a vacuum in space created by the speed and power of his tongue. This space can be filled with invisible Appetite Energy and used to "eat" away at anything in its path, and Midora claims this vacuum "eats" everything in its trail down to the atomic level.
- Mirror Neurons: Midora has particularly active cells in his brain that allow him to mimic skills. Using this, he can borrow moves and techniques from his opponents, like Ichiryuu's control over "minority atoms." He can further use this ability to give his cells a "camouflage," letting him become effectively invisible.
- Meteor Spice: The personification of Midora's "Gourmet Cells," his rage and hunger turns into massive bursts of destructive Appetite Energy that are fired out, perhaps without Midora's control or consent.

Dores
The Executive Chef of the Bishoku-kai, Dores is an elderly man with dark skin and thick white hair that sticks up. He also has a large mustache and beard that sticks out, much like Midora's. Dores wears a ninja-like outfit with two long knives on the back that he uses to fight with. Dores is capable of living in the Gourmet World. He has also defected to NEO, an organization that opposes both the IGO and the Bishokukai.
Niceny
Voiced by: Taiten Kusunoki (TV series)
The Aid to the Executive Chef, Niceny has slicked back brown hair and a small mustache, as well as pointed ears and black eyes with white pupils. Niceny wears a dark, tight-fitting suit with Chinese style dragons running down the arms. He appears to have the ability to stretch out his arms, as shown when he was preparing to fight with Ichiryuu. Niceny is capable of living in the Gourmet World and is called one of the "Gourmet World Elite" by other members of the Bishoku-kai. He has also defected to NEO, an organization that opposes both the IGO and the Bishokukai.
Kuromado (クロマド)
Voiced by: Tetsuo Kaneo (Japanese); Bill Jenkins (TV series) (English)
A Head Chef of the Bishoku-kai, he has black eyes with white pupils, a thin yet long mustache, and he wears a black chef's uniform with a very tall, black chef's hat. He is one of the few Bishoku-kai members capable of living in the Gourmet World. He has also defected to NEO, an organization that opposes both the IGO and the Bishokukai.
Boneless
A Head Chef of the Bishoku-kai, Boneless is a very large, muscular man with thick arms almost as long as his entire body. Boneless has pupil-less eyes and prominent fangs, but his most distinguishing feature is a large centipede-like creature wrapped around his entire body, with the head resting on top of his scalp. He has also defected to NEO, an organization that opposes both the IGO and the Bishokukai.
Kariu
A Head Chef of the Bishoku-kai, Kariu is a slim man with a black, beetle-like suit covering most of his body from the back, leaving his chest exposed. He has long, blond hair and long sunglasses attached to the suit. He has also defected to NEO, an organization that opposes both the IGO and the Bishokukai.

- Fly Net: Kariu chews a wad of some unknown substance and spits it out. The material falls around the target as a large, sticky cage. When used in combination with Kaitora's "Tablecloth," it is said to be impossible to escape from. However, Ichiryuu was easily able to tear it away.

Alfaro
Voiced by: Hideyuki Umezu (Japanese); John Swasey (TV series) (English)
The waiter (Garcon) of the Bishoku-kai and Kuromado's personal aide. He has a very large nose and eight arms, giving him the appearance of a spider. He also has been seen to resist the intense cold of Ice Hell while wearing just a tuxedo and cape. Alfaro is a very intelligent fighter knowing that a fight with Setsuno would result in them losing the Century Soup; this is indicated by Setsuno's ability to shatter Alfaro's plates with a glance. His attacks are all based on the plates he keeps hidden in his tuxedo, he is able to throw them fast enough to cut both the Parasite Emperor and Hellsboros (each with capture levels of 81 and 72 respectively) literally to pieces. He is one of the few Bishoku-kai members capable of living in the Gourmet World, shown when he brought the Boss his soup inside the Gourmet World.

- Plate Shuriken: Alfaro throws several plates at a target at high enough speed and with enough force to cut through multiple targets at once.

Limon
The sommelier of the Bishoku-kai, Limon is a woman of average build, with long black hair and strange markings under her eyes. She is one of the few Bishoku-kai members that Alfaro says are capable of entering the Gourmet World.

- Damage Tasting: Limon appears to have the ability to transfer damage done to her to the opponent or opponents who inflicted it. This includes mortal wounds, as Limon can be shot and live while the shooter will die.

Kaitora
The Exclusive Saiseiya of the Bishoku-kai, Kaitora is a dark-skinned man with six arms, no mouth or pupils, and has a bit of a gut. He also doesn't wear a shirt and has long tattoos down his arms. Being a saiseiya, whose duties are to protect ingredients from being abused world-wide, it is unknown what his job within the Bishoku-kai is. Kaitora is capable of living in the Gourmet World. Kaitora, along with Yosaku, were mentored by the Living Gourmet National Treasure Mohyan Shaishai and both he and Shaishai have defected to NEO.

- Root of Thorns: Kaitora uses a long whip with a series of white thorns that can rip off opponent's limbs.
- Tablecloth: Kaitora produces a long, sheet-like substance from his hand that is very sticky. When used in combination with Kariu's "Fly Net," it is said to be impossible to escape from. However, Ichiryuu was easily able to tear it away.

Starjun (スタージュン, Sutājun)
Voiced by: Shin-ichiro Miki (Japanese); Scott Freeman (TV series) (English)
Sous Chef of the Bishoku-kai, Starjun has long black hair, usually seen wearing a metal helmet with spikes. When he is not wearing his helmet, he has a calm face with a small dot on his forehead and dark scars on the right side of his face, covering his ear and part of his neck. He is not one to mince words and will admit his mistakes, and e.g. he operates the GT Robo that Toriko defeats in the Regal Mammoth. He appears to be noble, or at least respectful to those he considers strong, since in his fight with Toriko he set the GT Robo's pain sensors to 100% to test and feel Toriko's maximum power. Later he claims that it would be difficult to not test Toriko. He has a habit of scratching his head with one finger. He is one of the few Bishoku-kai members capable of entering the Gourmet World. Since Starjun has the roles of a bishoku-ya as well as a chef, he is in a combo with Ootake, who trained with Komatsu when he was younger. When he ate the food "Another", the food unlocks all his memories revealing that his Toriko's biological brother.

- Intimidation: Like Toriko's or Mansam's intimidations, except Starjun projects a one-eyed demon.
- Barbecueing: Starjun appears to have the ability to create intense heat, able to do as little as barbecuing an animal by touching to being able to create a huge amount of fire to engulf himself and others. Toriko estimates the heat of his flames to be no less than 2800 degrees Fahrenheit.
- Thermal Disinfection: Starjun wraps an infected or poisoned part of his body in intense heat, killing the biological components and neutralizing the disease or poison. This disinfection is even capable to get rid of Coco's lethal poison.
- Camp Fire: Starjun creates an enormous fire that surrounds himself and others. It is strong enough to dissipate Sunny's "Hair Lock" and can spread quickly in a moderate distance. Zebra's "Sound Armor" seems to be able to defend against this outburst of fire, however.

- Camp Fire Medium Flame: A concentrated form of the "Camp Fire" that Starjun envelops around himself, making it burn and blow apart structures surrounding him.
- Camp Fire Strong Flame: The most powerful form of Starjun's "Camp Fire" technique. It is the same as his other "Camp Fire" attacks, but much stronger.

- Fire Shield: Starjun surrounds his hand in large flames and can catch and block attacks this way, effectively "melting" the force of the attack.

- Fire Shield Bon Fire: Using both hands to create a larger Fire Shield that can directly burn his opponents after blocking their attack.

- Fire Spear: Starjun surrounds his hand with a concentrated flame and powerfully jabs his hand in a stabbing motion.
- Burner Punch: Starjun covers his fist in fire and delivers a strong punch that can burn through his opponent.
- Burner Shot: Starjun quickly strikes with both hands covered in flames. It appears that these attacks can also be thrown, similar to Toriko's "Flying Fork" attack.
- Burner Knife: A large sword-like kitchen knife that Starjun designed to cut and grill specially prepared ingredients simultaneously. It is incredibly powerful and Starjun is perhaps at his strongest when he is fighting with it, although he has never fought against a human being with his "Burner Knife".

- Flame Tornado: Using the "Burner Knife," Starjun creates a gigantic tornado of flame, which can both defend against attacks as well as be used offensively.
- Burner Broil Stab: Using the "Burner Knife," Starjun delivers a drilling stab that easily pierces through enemies, severely burning them in the process.
- Single Stroke Grill Cut: An iai technique, Starjun gives one quick, strong slash with his "Burner Knife".
Grinpatch (グリンパーチ, Gurinpāchi)
Voiced by: Yuji Mitsuya (Japanese); Chris Rager (TV series) (English)
Sous Chef of the Bishoku-kai, Grinpatch can suck up large amounts of food with his giant straw and has two extra pairs of arms, gaining a second pair of arms since meeting Toriko. He has the same eyes as Kuromado and Yū except he has three pupils in each eye instead of just one. For transportation and food collection, he has a pet Jack Elephant (CLVL 85), which is large and strong enough to cut down an entire ear of BB Corn and carry it. Grinpatch also appears to have a high tolerance for poison, able to suck up and eat some of Coco's highly lethal and corrosive poison without any ill effect. He seems to be very lazy as he does not fulfill his mission of retrieving the GT Robos because he does not feel like fighting the Gourmet Association's second and third. Another example of his laziness is that he does not finish the full names of places and things, calling the Regal Plateau the "Regal-whatever" and the Devil's Athletics the "Athletics-looking place". He agrees with Starjun that it is hard to not test Toriko's strength. He is one of the few Bishoku-kai members that Alfaro says are capable of entering the Gourmet World.

- Breath: Grinpatch's lung capacity is inhuman, as shown during his brief fight with Toriko, as he can use his breath like a gun or bazooka when combined with his straw. After their brief battle, Toriko realizes that he was just playing around the entire time.
- Devil Mosquito Straw: A straw made from the mouth of a "Devil Mosquito"; it is very resistant that Toriko could not cut it with his normal Knife. Grinpatch uses it mainly for sucking food. With his lung capacity, he also uses it to fire air bullets that could easily damage Toriko.

- Breath Gun: A technique combining Grinpatch's impressive Breath with the use of his Straw, he shoots fast bullets of air that are strong enough to tear through Toriko's flesh. It is considered his low-power attack.
- Breath Bazooka: A technique combining Grinpatch's impressive Breath with the use of his Straw, he shoots a massive cyclone of air that can tear through rock. This technique, although much stronger than the Breath Gun, takes time for Grinpatch to take prepare and his vision is obscured while using it. It is considered his high-power attack.
Tommyrod (トミーロッド, Tomīroddo)
Voiced by: Akira Ishida (Japanese); Greg Ayres (TV series) (English)
Sous Chef of the Bishoku-kai, Tommy has a bug-like appearance complete with wings. Tommy raises "parasite bugs" inside his body and can spew them out at will. His lack of emotion allows him to fight at complete efficiency, focusing solely on the goal at hand. It is also revealed that his armbands allow him to limit his strength. He is the first Bishoku-kai to seriously fight Toriko head-to-head (without using a GT Robo) with the intent to kill him. Since fighting Toriko, he has increased his Gourmet Cells, and is now more muscular, with a new arm that is darker that the rest of his body and four dark scars across his chest. He is one of the few Bishoku-kai members that can live in the Gourmet World. In the attack on Cooking Fest, Tommyrod was killed by Sunny's "Satan Hair".

- Intimidation: Like Toriko and Mansam, except Tommyrod's is a projection of a demonic octopus-like being with a vein-filled, pulsing head.
- Insect Production: Tommy's main ability is to produce a number of parasitic bugs from his body. He has approximately 10,000 parasitic eggs in his body, though it requires him to expend 1,500 kilo calories to hatch one egg in his esophagus before sending them out, because of this he cannot produce more than 1,000 insects per sitting. The bugs' capture levels range from very weak to some in the 40s, with 44 being the highest seen, aside from the Parasite Emperor.

- Exploding Insects [Insect beast] Capture Level 10 and Detonator Insect Capture Level 25: Tommy produces several small cylinder-shaped insects to latch onto an opponent, then he produces a much larger insect which, when killed, will detonate all the smaller insects in a very large explosion.
- Jongal Stag Beetle [Insect beast] Capture Level 38: Stag beetles with the size of a human hand. They are strife and their jaws can easily bite through human bones and flesh. A large gathering gave Toriko's group a lot of trouble with none of them managing to harm the insects due to their fast reactions and their tough shells.
- Parasite Emperor: A "devil that will eat anything without discrimination," the Parasite Emperor is a hybrid insect beast with a capture level of 81; it is created through cross-breeding numerous ferocious insect species. To be born it requires in essence all of Tommyrod's bodily energy, a testament to its power. Tommyrod also comments that he uses most of his energy to restrain this creature from being born. The beast's breath is below freezing; it can also release high temperature gas for flame-based attacks as well as excrete scorpion poisons and a spider web.

- Fangs: Tommyrod can grow fangs which are very sharp; normally he keeps them retracted to allow his insects to be born out of his mouth.
- Super Heated Breath: It is revealed that Tommy can heat his breath to very high temperatures and fire them off like bullets which explode when they hit the enemy though he normally uses this power to cause the eggs in his throat to hatch.

- Bomb Egg Storm: Using shivering and his super heated breath, Tommy can heat up and fire numerous eggs out of his body. The heat causes the acids and other chemicals inside the eggs to boil, turning them into miniature bombs with considerable power.

- Full Power Form: When removing the set of rings he keeps around his arms and waist Tommy's muscles and body grow to nearly double his own size.
- Wings: Tommyrod's insect wings are capable of flight and are extremely durable.

- Wing Shield: Since leveling up his Gourmet Cells, Tommy can now harden and manipulate his wings to act as shields.
Elg (エルグ, Erugu)
The First Branch Chief, Elg is also known as "Ageless Elg" and possess an immortal body. Ordinarily, Elg's torso, arms, and face are covered in bandages, showing only his short, black hair and the lower half of his body. This lower half is actually the legs of the Heraku horse, a type of mythical Gourmet World beast. The Heraku has regenerative properties, and by combining with it, Elg's cells are able to regenerate, making him immortal. Not only can Elg regenerate, but if his body is broken apart, he can regenerate into entirely new bodies, even if it is just the cells of his bodies that are separated. Although immortal, Tengu Buranchi overwhelms Elg's cells' ability to rejuvenate during the attack on Cooking Fest and kills Elg.

- Heraku Kick: Using his horse legs, Elg kicks the opponent. In the real world, most horse kicks are typically near-fatal, and Elg's legs contain considerably more power.

Yuu (ユー, Yū)
Voiced by: Tomoaki Maeno (Japanese); Eric Vale (TV series) (English)
The Second Branch Chief, he has the same kind of eyes as Kuromado, dresses in renaissance-like clothes, and is somewhat of a blond pretty boy. He appears to be the politest of the Chefs. He is the only member of the Bishoku-kai to be able to pilot the "Micro-Model" GT Robo, for unknown reasons. With this GT Robo, he attacks and incapacitates Komatsu and is able to take the last bits of Century Soup that he collected away. Yuu is later seen in the Gourmet World, meaning he is capable of living there and thus has a great deal of power.

- Stimulation Seasoning: Yuu produces a mist of seasoning that burns and dissolves opponents like acid.

Jerry Boy (ジェリーボーイ, Jerībōi)
Voiced by: Hidenori Takahashi (Japanese); J. Michael Tatum (TV series) (English)
The Third Branch Chef, Jerry Boy is a tan, blond-haired man who greatly resembles Toriko in appearance and clothes, save for his fanged teeth and his veins that show from his nose to his forehead as well as extended earlobes with multiple piercings. Jerryboy is later seen in the Gourmet World, meaning he is capable of living there and thus has a great deal of power.

- Splinter Particle Whip: Jerryboy has a large spiked whip that he uses to fight with, which gives off enormous power and has a very long range.

Barry Gamon (バリーガモン, Barīgamon)
Voiced by: Masafumi Kimura (Japanese); Mark Fickert (TV series) (English)
The Fourth Branch Chef, a stocky, bearded man with protruding tusks. He wears very little clothing, even in frigid conditions, and displays incredible resilience to these temperatures. The Fourth Branch is the cookware supply team for the Bishoku-kai, which explains Barry's unique armor that was made from the shell of the Crush Turtle, a level 60 beast. This shell is several times superior to steel, and is also used by master craftsmen to manufacture the best pans and utensils in the Gourmet World. He also produces naturally occurring antifreeze, allowing him to survive arctic conditions and use the same slick to deflect gunfire. It is shown he also has very effective healing abilities thanks to the Gori Leeks implanted in his body, because after being cut several times by Match his organs are able to paste themselves back together until he is fully healed.
Bogie Woods (ボギーウッズ, Bogīwazzu)
Voiced by: Eiji Takemoto (Japanese); Jerry Jewell (TV series) (English)
The Fifth Branch Chef, he wears a jogging suit, sport shades, and some kind of shell with a mask made from the body of an IGO agent that he used his ability on. He has approximately 4,000 bones and 4,600 joints, which he can easily detach and manipulate to allow him complete mobility and flexibility. He uses this quirk for his Lodge, a technique which allows him to inhabit another creature, assuming its form. Even if his bones are broken and removed, he can manipulate the rest of his unnatural capacity to compensate, barring the sacrum. However, even if the sacrum would happen to be removed or dislocated, his body will adjust in time and repair the nervous system, this process takes time but will be fully healed afterwards.
Cedre (セドル, Sedoru)
Voiced by: Akio Suyama (Japanese); David Trosko (TV series) (English)
The Sixth Branch Chef, the operator of the GT Robo that Sani defeats. He uses the skulls of animals as shoulder pads and has a rather morbid interest with eyeballs since he wears a necklace of them, which he collects from the animals he kills and throws them away when they rot and stop moving.
Joejoe (ジョージョー, Jōjō)
Voiced by: Bin Shimada (Japanese); Brad Venable (TV series) (English)
An old man in a black robe who works for the Bishoku-kai and monitors the GT Robos for them. He also appears to be the one who made Grinpatch's Straw. His mouth is covered in metallic stitching but he can still talk and open his mouth freely. He has also defected to NEO, an organization that opposes both the IGO and the Bishokukai.
Chiyo
The former head chef of Disappearance Cuisine, Chiyo is a small, elderly woman, with a very tight face and two large hair buns on both sides of her head. Known as "Delicate Cooking Chiyo," she was a world-renowned chef, one of the few "Supercooks" who won Cooking Fest at, and was on the same level as Setsuno. After her son died, she became frustrated with the philosophy of Food Honor and went missing for years, but returned as a part of the Bishoku-kai. She joined the Bishoku-kai because they made the promise that they could acquire Acacia's Full Course's Hors d'oeuvre, "Center," which is said to revive the dead. When Chiyo was younger, she was the assistant master of Shokurin Temple and was in a combo with the Shokurin Temple master, Chin Chinchin, whom she had her son with. Chiyo's skill with a knife is so delicate that she can remove a person's entire mid-section without them feeling it, and she is the only one with the skill to properly prepare Shokurin Temple's "Bubble Fruit," which requires a delicate knife to peel the bubble's skin.

- One-Stroke Thunder Cut: Using a small knife, Chiyo fires out a fast, swirling blade of air that cuts and twists what it hits.
- Manaita Shield: Using her "manaita," a type of Japanese cooking board, Chiyo defends herself against attacks. Her manaita is very durable, but was broken by Toriko's "Leg Knife".

Ootake
Voiced by: Hiro Yūki (TV series)
The former 99th ranked chef and former head chef of the 7-Star restaurant "Fairytale Castle," Ootake is a young chef with short, spiky hair, and since joining the Bishoku-kai, has his face covered in dark veins. He trained to be a chef with Komatsu, but upon becoming a highly ranked chef, he became more focused on money and fame than on the art of cooking and forgot about most of his time with Komatsu. To get his restaurant's and his own ranking higher, he paid journalists and food critics to give him good reviews. He was kidnapped by the Bishoku-kai to work as an enslaved chef, but at some point he became more accepting and has formed a combo with Staajyun. He has been trained in the Gourmet World and was injected with Gourmet Cells, so he is now much taller and more muscular, as well as more talented than he was before.

- Revitalizing Kitchen Knife: Using a knife made from animals with high rejuvenative properties, one can cut between the cells of a living creature and have the area that is cut recover at great speed. This method is banned by the IGO because it could be used to create an endless supply of food by regenerating living creatures, and because the necessary technique is so difficult to use.

Zaragira
The Bishoku-kai's "Food Management Office Chief," Zaragira is a large, muscular monstrous man, with random tentacles coming out of his body, large dark claws, and no apparent genitals. Zaragira is part of the Bishoku-kai's team to kidnap chefs to work as slaves for the organization and is strong enough to defeat powerful chefs like Reishun. Despite his strength, Zaragira was killed in one attack by Zebra.
Gur
A Bishoku-kai "Talent Scout," Gur is a large, muscular, bird-looking monster with puffy black shorts, a cape, and a chef's hat. Gur is part of the Bishoku-kai's team to kidnap chefs to work as slaves for the organization and is strong enough to defeat powerful chefs like Rikiya, whom he takes out with a single punch. Despite his strength, Gur was killed in one attack by Zebra.
Bei (ベイ)
Voiced by: Masashi Yabe (Japanese); Chris Cason (TV series) (English)
"Omnivorous Bei," the man responsible for the GT Robo attacks on the coliseum and a member of the Bishoku-kai, Starjun claims he has bad taste. He looks like a sort of goblin, and is a major glutton. Since his attack on the coliseum, Bei appears to have been given physical treatment through Gourmet Cells and is now much larger and more muscular and is strong enough to fight on his own without using a GT Robo.
Bile
A member of the Bishoku-kai, Bile appears to be a large gorilla-like creature with white fur. He calls himself the "appetizer" of the Bishoku-kai, if Midora is the "main course". He is capable of living in the Gourmet World.

=== NEO ===
The "New Food Utopia," NEO is a massive organization separate from both the IGO and the Bishoku-kai. The membership of NEO includes many of the major CEOs and other wealthy, powerful individuals. In addition, NEO members are also hidden in the IGO and the Bishoku-kai. The goal of NEO appears to be to control the food resources of the world, similar to what the Bishoku-kai wants, except NEO seems to only see the world's food in terms of money. However, NEO also has more information and resources than all other organizations, and with that information, can find rare ingredients that the Bishoku-kai cannot. Following the Cooking Fest, NEO has usurped Bishoku-kai as the primary antagonists of the series.

Joa
The personal chef to the king of the Jidar Kingdom, and the leader of NEO, Joa wears a formal Jidar outfit with a jester's hat and a cloth over his face most of the time. Without this disguise, Joa has the appearance the "Chef God" Frohze, but with many scale-like line across his face. It is eventually revealed that Joa is actually an unknown spirit inhabiting Frohze's body, having entered it after Frohze refused to come back to life even after being fed Center to revive her (as her and Acacia's plan required that she be in the afterlife). His eyes are big and orange like a cat or serpent's eyes and he has short black hair with multi-colored balls tied to the end in clumps, these balls are later revealed to be Life, a dish that allows its possessor to survive fatal wounds by dying in their stead. His skill as a chef is incredible; in addition to being the only chef able to totally remove the neo-solanine poison from the "Poison Potato," Joa was the original champion of the first "Cooking Fest," but was expelled and Setsuno was named winner instead. Joa is also very strong physically, having enough power to defeat Teppei and is willingly coming to Cooking Fest, even when the IGO and the Bishoku-kai are battling there. Joa has been seen using the legendary kitchen knife "Cinderella," which has a white, rocky handle and a long, elegant blade. This knife originally belonged to the real "Chef God," Frohze, the chef partner in the legendary bishoku-ya Acacia's combo. Joa also has the ability to completely activate his "Gourmet Cells," which turns his skin red and scaly, turns his teeth to fangs, and turns his hair bright white. Setsuno and Jirou attribute this ability to Joa eating all of Acacia's "Full Course Menu." He is finally killed when Midora kills all of his Life balls and drains him of his Food Luck. He is then mercy killed by Acacia as his body calcifies.

- Tasting Scope: Joa can change his vision to a radar-like viewing that show individuals and their relative power levels, or as Joa interprets it, their "flavors."
- Taste Change: Using the legendary kitchen knife "Cinderella," Joa makes a cut on a target that leaves a scar on their body. Somehow, this brainwashes the target into siding with Joa and following her orders.
- 10 Million Slice Fillet: With a swing of her kitchen knife, Joa sends out millions of powerful slices in one burst. Collectively, this attack can have the power to burst through the enormous walls of the Cooking Fest arena, all the way into the ocean, where even the sea is cut and separated.
- God Cooking - Sky Cut: Joa makes one, huge horizontal cut that can dissipate tsunamis .
- Satan Mince: Using his knife, Joa blocks and dismantles attacks against his, especially projectile attacks. This requires many quick and successive movements and creates a huge burst of energy as the attacks are destroyed.
- Freshness UP Revitalizing Cut: A "dark technique" that only talented chefs can use with specialty knives cutting between the cells to stimulate regrowth. Joa's version can affect target without even cutting them directly and can revive them instantly, and on top of that, those he revives in this way come back many times stronger than before.

Colonel Mokkoi
The president of the company Gouradake, a company with a 20 trillion yen annual profit, Mokkoi is one of the most visible members of NEO. He has a curiosity and hunger for rare ingredients, financing the trip to Ice Hell to retrieve the original Century Soup. He is a short, elderly man, with balding, white hair, a gnarled nose, and he is always seen with a big pipe. Mokkoi relies on a GT Robo that looks exactly like him to do business, especially if it seems risky.
Mahmai Moi
The president of the company "Gourmet Tourist," the only travel company in the world with the ability to take customers to space. The company has a market value of 812 trillion yen, the 3rd highest in the world. Moi himself is an elderly man with dark skin, many freckles and liver spots, and short white hair, as well as a white mustache and beard. As a part of NEO, he seems to be focused on creating a "food utopia," asking for talented chefs to be spared and instead brought with them. Moi employs Nakaume, the next in line to inherit the "Nakaume Cooking Academy" and a close friend of Komatsu, as his personal chef.
Darnil Kahn
The king of the Jidar Kingdom, Kahn is a short, elderly dark skinned man with white hair and a beard covered by a turban, and elongated earlobes. He treats his servants poorly, spitting food into their faces if they do not prepare it correctly. A member of NEO, Kahn has access to vast amounts of wealth and information, with an even greater intelligence network than the IGO and Bishoku-kai combined. Kahn has some interest in an unknown location, and having found it, has left the Jidar Kingdom. There is also some evidence that Kahn was never actually in the Jidar Kingdom, but was instead operating remotely from a GT Robo.
Mohyan Shaishai
One of the four Living Gourmet National Treasures, Mohyan Shaishai is the top Saiseiya in the world. It is said that only he can revive beasts that have been successfully sealed away and "Knocked" by the Knocking Master Jirou, like the Four Beast and the Hammertusk. Shaishai mentored a number of prominent Saiseiyas, like Yosaku and Kaitora, as well as a young Saiseiya named Pukin. Shaishai is an elderly man with a wrinkled, frog-like face and long, white hair, styled in spike-like shapes. According to Kaitora, he has joined NEO and revived the Four Beast for them.
Kuribou
Kousairou
Zaus
Appolo
Kaitora
Nomarch
One of the IGO's G7 Taste Masters. He is an old man with lots of liver spots on his head and is always seen carrying a gnarled wooden cane.
Toppo
One of the IGO's G7 Taste Masters. He is a tall, old man with a flat face and beak-like nose, as well as slicked-back white hair and tiny glasses.
Ahmon
One of the IGO's G7 Taste Masters. He is a short, middle aged man with shoulder-length messy black hair, saggy, wrinkled skin, and long, cat-like whiskers.

=== Saiseiya ===
The Saiseiya are a gourmet police, given the power of judgment to arrest anyone dealing with illegal gourmet products, in both procurement and black market trading. Their powers also extend to those who break the law by overfishing and poaching certain species.

Yosaku
Voiced by: Banjō Ginga (Japanese); Bruce Carey (TV series) (English)
An expert Saiseiya and Teppei's master. He is nicknamed "Blood-stained Yosaku" due to his seemingly brutal methods of healing. He wears a blood-soaked doctor's coat (befitting to his nickname), a black bandanna worn over his hair and is always seen smoking a cigar branch. Yosaku is also one of the staff members of the 0th Biotope, an IGO Garden in the Gourmet World. He hates following rules of any kind, be it simple rules such as to not smoke in a restaurant or go against rules of life itself. He has been described as a very strong person able to take down one of the Four Heavenly Kings, with Teppei's assistance (though Teppei notes that Yosaku had fully restrained him), a testament to his power. Despite his rough appearance he is a master in healing, proven when he completely heals three of Match's subordinates (all of whom were in critical conditions) in a matter of minutes, he also has in his possession medicine that can cure any disease in the Human World. He has also stated that he could completely heal Toriko's missing arm, though the process would take twenty years to complete. His job as a member of the 0th Biotope is to revive Acacia's dessert course, "EARTH," which is also the dessert course selected by Sani. He appears to be fighting and training Sani to see if he has the level of power needed to enter the Gourmet World.

- Wood Punch: A basic, frontal punch.
- Kidzuke Shock: Yosaku brutally presses at all the body's pressure points, waking the target. This can wake people from comatose states in an instant.
- Paste Spittle: Yosaku's saliva works as a strong bonding agent and he uses it to seal wounds. He uses this on a Gourmet Yakuza whose arm is nearly ripped off and states that it will heal within ten minutes.

Teppei (鉄平)
Voiced by: Masaya Onosaka (Japanese); David Wald (TV series) (English)
A top level Saiseiya, Teppei is a considered an expert Knocker, able to deal with numerous hybrid insects birthed by Tommyrod as well as the Bishoku-kai Vice Chef himself. Teppei has been under the tutelage of the "Knocking Master" Jirō (his relative), the fruits of which are shown through his adept Knocking ability as well as his pompadour. Teppei also carries with him supplies such as Forest Seeds and liquids capable of instantly growing these sturdy plants. Teppei has control over his Gourmet Cells, shown by his lack of "white breath" in Ice Hell, and he has been able to match Zebra blow-for-blow in a fight. While Teppei is more than capable as a Knocking master, his primary way of fighting appears to be using the many different seeds and plants he carries with him and growing them quickly with special liquid he carries in his earrings. Since being attacked by Joa, Teppei appears to have been brainwashed by the dark chef and is currently working with him.

- Impact Knocking: Teppei is able to perform very precise Knocking using his bare hands. His mastery of Knocking allows him to paralyze even rare insects. His Knocking as a form of combat appears to have various levels of intensity. In his fight against Tommyrod, he uses "Medium" Knocking, and as a finishing move, "Well Done" Knocking. The levels of Knocking appear to be named after ways of cooking meat.
- Nail Injection: Dripping some of the herbs he carries with him, Teppei can grow one of his fingernails into an elongated hypodermic needle to inject medicine. One of Teppei's fingernails is also a short but incredibly sharp knife.
- Protection Tree: One of Teppei's plants that he carries with him, he plants a fast-growing seed that wraps around a target with very sturdy, vine-like trunks, protecting it from harm or holding it together.
- Binding Tree: One of Teppei's plants, he grows a series of roots at his hands that he can manipulate. The tree can then grow up through the ground somewhere else and bind an opponent. This tree is strong enough to even subdue powerful people like Zebra and Setsuno.
- Umbrella Tree: One of Teppei's plants, this one grows high then flat, creating a guard from airborne attacks or intolerable substances from the sky.
- Sound Insulation Tree: One of Teppei's plants, this tree grows at an ordinary height but its branches are flat and oddly textured. But, they can easily absorb sound and sound-based attacks, like Zebra's.
- Earthquake Resistant Root: One of Teppei's plants, this one combines with the other plants Teppei uses in battle to support them against powerful attacks.

=== Shokurin Temple ===
Shokurin Temple is a world-famous temple where strict "Food Etiquette" or "Food Honor" is taught. Shokurin Temple has many smaller, pilot schools around the world, but the main temple is located in the Lost Forest, a mysterious forest the size of Africa. Some prisoners from Honey Prison are taken to Shokurin Temple to learn "Food Honor," in the hopes that they will be rehabilitated. Because of the vastness of the Lost Forest, very few people ever find Shokurin Temple, so it is also known as Disappearance Temple. Shokurin Temple is made out of special materials that will make the temple turn invisible and even attack guests who do not show any "Food Honor." Near Shokurin Temple is the 10-star restaurant Disappearance Cuisine, which is made out of similar material to Shokurin Temple and will be invisible to those who do not have "Food Honor," and one must bow before it in order to see the restaurant. At Shokurin Temple, one can find the "Bubble Fruit," which is a very high-class ingredient made out of a bubble, but it cannot even be approached, let alone eaten, unless someone has mastered "Food Honor."

Chin Chinchin
Voiced by: Yūsaku Yara (TV series)
The master of Shokurin Temple and one of the four Gourmet Living National Treasures, Chin Chinchin is a short old man with orange hair in a friar-like round haircut, a small mustache, freckles, and small glasses, although when he gets serious in battle, he becomes much larger with bulging muscles. He also wears a long Chinese-style robe with "Food Honor" written on the front in Japanese. When he was younger, his combo partner was the ex-head chef of Disappearance Cuisine, Chiyo, whom he also had a son with. He has a habit of getting people's names wrong, which goes with a seeming lack of interest in other people. Later, he explained that he only remembers the names of people who are truly talented in "Food Honor," and the only people whose names he remembers are Toriko, Komatsu, and Chiyo. Chin Chinchin is a member of the IGO's "0th Biotope" in the Gourmet World, and as a favor to Ichiryuu, he has been monitoring Toriko's training as he's collected the ingredients on the President's list, and he was the one who sent Toriko and Sani the giant mountain fragment at Death Falls. Chin Chinchin has totally mastered "Food Honor," and can eat the difficult-to-eat food at Disappearance Cuisine with great ease and speed.

- Spoon: Chin Chinchin cups his hand to create a "Spoon," like how Toriko uses his "Knife" and "Fork." He can use this to scoop out an entire mountain, or can throw it to shoot a burst of air, which can propel him through the air or scoop up intangible things, such as fire.

- Spoon Dome: Using both hands, Chin Chinchin uses both hands to create a sphere made from the air from his "Spoon" to act as both a shield and a prison for those inside it. When "locked," only Chin Chinchin can open it.

- Food Immersion: The secret technique of Shokurin Temple, Chin Chinchin can store several months worth of food within his organs and use the energy from it to stay replenished for a long period of time. This also causes him to be much heavier, at point having a body weight of one ton. This technique is passed onto those who complete the training of "Bubble Road," which is also the training to obtain the temple's treasure, the "Bubble Fruit".

Shuu
An assistant master of Shokurin Temple, Shuu is a slender young man with a long braided ponytail that starts black and turns blond. He wears a Chinese-style robe with "Food Honor" written on it like Chin Chinchin. Shuu trains Toriko and Komatsu in "Food Honor" so they can make their techniques more efficient, and he says that his training is much more reasonable and safe than Chin Chinchin's.

- Petty Knife: Shuu uses his hand as a knife, like how Toriko uses his "Knife." But, Shuu's "Petty Knife" has much less power, and can only cut clothing and hair, but it is incredibly fine and delicate, and can cut off the sleeves of clothes without touching a person's skin and shave off a person's faintest amounts of facial hair in the middle of a fight.
- Shokugi - Instant Blood Removal: Using a small knife instead of his "Petty Knife," Shuu makes a small but incredibly precise cut on an opponent's arteries to try to make them lose a lot of blood at once.

Koppwo
An assistant master of Shokurin Temple, Koppwo is an elderly man with large glasses, a large beard, and braided hair. He appears to be old enough to remember when Chiyo was at Shokurin Temple.

- Shokugi - Hundred Piece Filet: Using a small knife, Koppwo slices through the air very quickly, sending out a hundred flying air blades, much like Toriko's "Flying Knife" technique.

Wagon
An assistant master of Shokurin Temple, Wagon is a large man with a square jaw and long, black hair. He fights using a large pair of nunchucks with knives on the ends called "Deba Nunchuck". While protecting Shokurin Temple, Wago was killed by former assistant master and former combo partner of Chin Chinchin, "Delicate Cooking" Chiyo.
Chiru
The current head chef of Disappearance Cuisine, Chiru is ranked 15th among chefs world-wide. Chiru wears a ninja-like outfit that obscures her face, along with the Disappearance Cuisine logo on the forehead band. Without the mask, Chiru has short black hair and dark markings, possibly scars, across her nose and cheeks. As a child, Chiru trained at Shokurin Temple, so she has mastered "Food Honor" and is capable of cooking the ingredients at Disappearance Cuisine that demand high levels of "Food Honor" to prepare and eat. Like Komatsu, Chiru heard the "voice" of the ingredients from Ichiryuu's full course menu.

- Revitalizing Kitchen Knife: Using a knife made from animals with high rejuvenative properties, one can cut between the cells of a living creature and have the area that is cut recover at great speed. This method is banned by the IGO because it could be used to create an endless supply of food by regenerating living creatures, and because the necessary technique is so difficult to use.
- Raging Waves Cut: Chiru uses her speed and delicacy to avoid attacks while slashing quickly at opponents.

Chirin
An employee at Disappearance Cuisine, Chirin is a short, chubby man with a ninja-like outfit, but his face is not covered. He is very rude and does not appear to be as well trained in "Food Honor."

=== Gourmet Yakuza ===
An organization much hated by the constitutional countries, seemingly made up completely of orphans and slum dogs from the crime slum Nerg, a non-IGO affiliated city. 10% of the prisoners in Gourmet Prison come from this city, giving it the nickname "Criminal-Producing Factory." The Yakuza, seemingly altruistic, are told by the Boss upon joining to repay their debt not to him, but to the "hungry children of the slums." Since defeating the Underground Cooking World, Match has taken control of the Gourmet Yakuza and they are running the Jidar Kingdom together with the Underground Cooking World.

Ryuu
The former boss of the Gourmet Yakuza, Ryuu is an old man with skin covered in bullet scars, as well as long, wild hair and mustache. By the request of the Saiseya Yosaku, Ryuu has recently become a member of the IGO's "0th Biotope" and has left with executive members of the Gourmet Yakuza for the Gourmet World, leaving Match as the new boss.
Match (マッチ, Matchi)
Voiced by: Kosuke Toriumi (Japanese); Jason Douglas (TV series) (English)
Former Vice Boss and current Boss of the Gourmet Yakuza, he is completely covered in scars received at the hands of Zebra of the Four Heavenly Kings. He wields a single sword and is adept in the art of Iai, unsheathing, striking and sheathing the sword in a single movement. His ability allows his strength to be proportionate to his exhaustion, so the more tired he is, the more powerful he becomes. The sword he uses is made from a fang of the king of aquatic dragons, the Leodragon. This beast hunts and is capable of crushing the shell of a Crush Turtle with its jaws. Match takes advantage of this fact to cut through Barry Gamon's armor made of the same shell.

- Iai: Sanmai Oroshi: Match uses his quick Iai style to cut an opponent into three parts, separating the spine from the other two halves of an opponent's body.
- Iai: Hirabiraki: In one quick slash, Match makes a fatal cut across an opponent's gut.
- Meuchi Ichirinzashi: Match stabs an opponent quickly, which puts him into a position to slice his target in half as he withdraws his blade.
- Kaiten Kabutowari: After stabbing an opponent with "Meuchi Ichirinzashi," Match turns his katana back in a circular motion, which cleanly and quickly cuts the opponent in half.
- Ittou Ryoudan Kaburigiri: With one quick slash, Match slices an opponent's in two.

- Iai: Ryuuou Ittou Ryoudan: Described by Match as the way to "fully utilize" his katana, Ryuuou, Match gathers his rage quietly for three minutes and then releases it all in one powerful iai. This creates a quick-draw that is more powerful than his other techniques.

=== Gourmet Knights ===
The Gourmet Knights follow "Gourmet Doctrine": to entrust one's life completely to nature. This means shunning man-made medicines, putting Takimaru at odds despite his affiliation. Other tenets of the "Gourmet Doctrine" include a month of fasting, as well as avoiding extravagant food. All of the Gourmet Knights shown so far ride horses and wear a plain jumpsuit, with different straight-line tattoos around the eyes. The Gourmet Knights are based from "Simple Diet Hill," a small, hilled area free from human development, which is near the village "Eco Land," where the citizens use only all-natural supplies.

Members of the Gourmet Knights are broken up into different "groups," with four groups being shown so far: The Four Seasons group, the Blue Sky group, the Hidden Leaf group, and the Milky Way group. Whether this is the extent of the Gourmet Knight "groups" or what the functions of the different groups are is unknown at this time.

Aimaru (愛丸)
Voiced by: Kenji Nojima (Japanese); Chris Smith (TV series) (English)
Leader of the Gourmet Knights, he is capable of eating bacteria and viruses, which enables him to devour diseases. This allowed Aimaru to "eat" most of Takimaru's "Gourmet World" disease, which almost killed Aimaru as well. He is one of Toriko's old friends and they have a friendly rivalry to see who can obtain GOD first. Aimaru has also completed training at Shokurin Temple and has learned the temple's secret technique, "Food Immersion." Aimaru's full fighting potential has not yet been observed, but he has the ability to turn bacteria in one's body into a virus and can even transform all of the trillions of bacteria that exist in the body simultaneously.

- Preshot Routine - Senya no Oshie: Aimaru uses a visualization technique to prepare himself to attack with his preferred weapon, a longbow.
- Supreme Routine: While Aimaru and the other Gourmet Knights use visualization to increase the accuracy and power of their attacks, Aimaru has gone further and created a method to focus and bring out more precision and power through imagination and self-confidence. This routine simply involves Aimaru believing that something will happen, allowing it to become reality. For example, if he believes his attack will be successful, his body will respond in kind, and if he believes that he will heal from an injury, he will recover faster. This is essentially an expanded placebo effect to all of Aimaru's actions and bodily functions. Aimaru passed this ability onto Toriko to prepare him for future fights.

Takimaru (滝丸)
Voiced by: KENN (Japanese); Todd Haberkorn (TV series) (English)
A new member highly skilled in martial arts, he joins Toriko's party as they enter the Ice Hell in search of Century Soup, as he needs money to buy medicine for Aimaru. He faces off against Bogey Woods and manages to discover his weakness about his sacrum, proving his intelligence, as well as momentarily defeating him albeit becoming gravely injured. He once suffers a disease from the Gourmet World, which are referred to as curses because known science has no cure for them. Aimaru consumes the disease and leaves only one of his eyes infected, at great personal expense. He is later rescued by Teppei and healed completely by Yosaku. He also receives the medicine which can cure any disease in the human world from Yosaku.

Techniques:

- Pre-Shot Routines: His attacks are all based around a type of martial arts involving his Pre-Shot Routines, where he focuses his energy in a specific stance. This makes his attacks take longer to hit and leaves him vulnerable to attacks; however, once he completes the routine his attacks have perfect accuracy and high destructive power.
- Sennuki Shot: An attack that requires intense concentration, hence the need for the Pre-Shot Routines, Takimaru grabs the opponent and twists deeply into their body to dislocate one of their bones, usually a spinal vertebrae, and usually causes paralysis or death. The attack means "Corkscrew Shot," and because Takimaru twists his hands into his opponent and then "pops out" their vertebrae, it is similar to a corkscrew un-corking a bottle.

- Sennuki Shot: Ōgi Cork Screw: A more intense version of the Sennuki Shot that requires Takimaru's best Pre-Shot Routine to prepare. This attack physically tears out the bone that Takimaru targets. "Ōgi" is Japanese for "Secret Technique."

- Sennuki Press: A move that does not require a Pre-Shot Routine, Takimaru raises and turns one of his legs sideways and then presses an opponent between his raised knee and his two elbows.

Akimaru
A member of the Gourmet Knight's "Four Seasons group," Akimaru is a young man with well-styled short black hair, with two line eye-tattoos above and below each eye. Akimaru appears to fight with a longbow and arrows and has enough skill to make his arrows change trajectory in mid-air.
Yukimaru
A member of the Gourmet Knight's "Blue Sky group," Yukimaru is a young man with short blond hair and small, intense eyes, with two line tattoos below each eye. Toriko describes Yukimaru as being an "elite" and having a rare level of power.
Raimaru
A member of the Gourmet Knight's "Blue Sky group," Raimaru is a young man with long black hair and a headband, as well as two line eye-tattoos below his eyes. Toriko describes Raimaru as being an "elite" and having a rare level of power.
Kagemaru
A member of the Gourmet Knight's "Hidden Leaf group," Kagemaru is a young man wearing a turban with dark skin, thick lips, with three line eye-tattoos below his eyes, as well as a scar running up his left cheek. Toriko describes Kagemaru as being an "elite" and having a rare level of power.
Tsukimaru
A member of the Gourmet Knight's "Milky Way group," Tsukimaru is a young man with long blond hair, a headband with a moon symbol on it, like Takimaru's, and a cloth mask covering his nose and mouth. Toriko describes Tsukimaru as being an "elite" and having a rare level of power.

=== World Ranking Chefs ===
Every month, the top 100 chefs in the world are chosen by the IGO's G7. Every four years, those 100 chefs compete in an international competition known as "Cooking Fest."

Zaus
The "King of Cooking", Zaus is the number one ranked chef in the world. Besides his impressive rank as a chef, Zaus has also won the international chef competition "Cooking Fest" 14 times, including the most recent "Cooking Fest." However, Setsuno reminded him that the only Cooking Fests he has won are ones where Setsuno was not present to compete. Zaus wears a dark red jacket with a striped shirt, with a tall chef's hat of the same color. Zaus also has a long white beard with tightly braided hair wrapping over his shoulder, with scars on his right eye. Zaus has a serious, striking gaze. Melk the First said that the knife of Zaus is one of the few knives he got a shock from after seeing. Zaus is also secretly a member of NEO, an organization which opposes both the IGO and the Bishoku-kai, and his devotion to the organization is so great that he does not hesitate to suggest that his fellow members attack Setsuno, whom he appeared to be friends with.

- One Blade Cycle of Reincarnation Grate: With his blade, Zaus makes one long, quick slash that cuts across the enemy. The cut is incredibly accurate and if someone is holding onto a target, he can cut it in half without cutting the hand at all. The cut engraves itself in the target's DNA, so the scars that it makes will exist in their family for generations.

Setsuno (節乃)
Voiced by: Kei Hayami (VOMIC), Sakiko Uran (Japanese); Juli Erickson (TV series) (English)
A Gourmet Living National Treasure and #2 ranked chef in the world, Setsuno is Jirō's long-time partner, and has the same Full-Course Meal as him. She has the skill and capability of easily doing the work of eight top-level chefs. Setsuno has the record for most victories in "Cooking Fest," having won the competition 29 times in the past. Setsuno attempts to recreate the legendary Century Soup Jirō gave to her at some point; however, it is incomplete and she requests Toriko and Komatsu to find the missing ingredient after being impressed by their relationship and strong knowledge and respect of the gourmet ingredients. Although an old woman, she still has incredible power, breaking all of Alfaro's Plate Shuriken from far away without seeming to move, and is one of the few people brave enough to call the Bishoku-kai boss an "idiot." However, she has still lost some of her power since her early days, losing some of her ability to let her Gourmet Cells "adapt." This is characterized by her having "White Breath" in Ice Hell, meaning her Cells did not adapt to the cold environment and warm her body accordingly. Melk the First said that the knife of Setsuno is one of the few knives he got a shock from after seeing. Setsuno has the ability to control the air pressure around her and can increase it to a high degree to crush the bodies of enemies. She seems to also be able to project this power to create a protective shield around her from attacks. Setsuno has one of the few knives that interests the world's greatest kitchen knife maker, Melk. It is a small, lightning-bolt shaped knife named Takitsuba, Japanese for waterfall saliva. She can also change its form into a more traditional knife shape.

- High Pressure Cooker: A widespread attack where Setsuno crushes all the enemies around her to death by constricting the air pressure. Setsuno can also create this attack as a "mental projection" to intimidate enemies and dissuade them from attacking her.
- Wall of Pressure: Using her ability to manipulate air pressure, Setsuno creates a small shield of pressure that can even defend against Midora's "Meteor Spice."
- Secret Technique - Flavor Flow: Setsuno focuses on an incoming attack and is able to deflect most of it head-on, depending on the level of the attack, using her unique kitchen knife Takitsuba.
- Cook Road: Using the "changed form" of Takitsuba, Setsuno creates a large, snaking cut that can pursue an enemy.

Tengu Buranchi
The #3 ranked chef in the world and chef at the restaurant "Tengu Castle," "Bizarre Cooking" Tengu Buranchi is a genius chef who is considered the "delinquent equivalent" to Zebra in the chef world. Matching his "Tengu" name, Buranchi has dark-red skin and a long, tengu-like nose. He also has slicked back blond hair, multiple piercings, including one in the center of his forehead, and sharp, jagged teeth. This, combined with the school-uniform type clothing Buranchi wears, gives him the appearance of a stereotypical Japanese high school delinquent, his tengu-like appearance aside. Buranchi has only ever appeared in one Cooking Fest, which he also handily won. The reason for his non-appearance in other fests seems to be due to his bad attitude. Buranchi possesses incredible speed and strength, as well as a delicacy and respect for food that even makes him like Komatsu, despite his haughty and violent attitude. Buranchi is incredibly strong and fast, winning the "Cooking Fest's" Triathlon, beating Setsuno, Zaus, and Yuda, despite starting far later than all other competitors. A greater testament to his power is that Buranchi is from the "Bewitching Food World" inside the "Gourmet World" and is even in close communication with the Dharma hermits. Buranchi's body contains electricity-producing organs like an electric eel, but each of his cells also act as amplifiers. With this, Buranchi can produce over 100,000 amperes of electricity. While Buranchi can amplify electricity naturally, he still needs it to be produced by an outside force. He usually uses batteries that he inserts into his neck for this electricity, but he can also use other forms of electricity, such as wind, solar, and even kinetic energy he builds up by being attacked. Buranchi's electric attacks work by producing a conductive path, then filling that path with his electricity for the attack. The second step produces an electrical attack at a speed of 10,000 kilometers per second. Buranchi can also reach this speed physically, but only for a very short period of time.

- Parallel Electric Punch: Buranchi fires a large bolt of electricity from his fist that travels from target to target, incinerating the enemy at the cellular level.
- Parallel Electric Chop: Buranchi sends one huge bolt of electricity down onto his opponent. This discharge is equivalent to that of a natural lightning strike.
- Parallel Electric Cutter: Buranchi fires a series of lightning bolts down onto his opponent and modifies them to slice at the opponent's body rather than just shock them.
- Fuurai Katamitachi: A much larger, faster version of the Parallel Electric Cutter, Buranchi blows past his opponents and tears them up with his speed and electric blades.
- Electric Knife: A direct attack, Buranchi surrounds his hand with electricity and slices at the opponent directly.
- Lightning Kitchen Knife: By producing a large, concentrated burst of electricity, Buranchi and create and hold a large blade made out of electricity. Creating this weapon takes a large amount of Buranchi's power and is enough to wipe out his batteries.

- Spiral Lightning Fine Cut: Using his Lightning Knife, Buranchi makes one large, spinning cut that fries and tears apart an opponent at the cellular level.
Series Great Electrification Attack: One of Buranchi's "secret techniques," this is an enormous wave of electricity that can obliterate a large number of opponents. It also electrifies their cells, so the electric current persists in their body and does not go away after the attack has hit.
Damala Sky the 13th
The current owner of "Damala's Curry," and the #4 ranked chef in the world, Damala Sky is a tall, stern man with long black hair, a mustache, and a dark 5 'o' clock shadow. Damala's chef outfit resembles a military outfit, with tassels on the shoulders and hat, as well as a badge or medal on his chest. His restaurant's logo is on his shirt and hat and resembles a melting heart on a plate. Damala also wears what looks like a highly mechanized monocle over his right eye. His restaurant, "Damalascurry," has an annual turn-over of 10 trillion yen. When Toriko and Coco found Ichiryuu's "Hors D'Œuvre" ingredient in the president's Full Course Menu, he was one of the few chefs shown to "hear the voice" of the ingredient.

- Spice Magic: Throwing a cloud of curry spices, Damala can stun and incapacitate an opponent for a brief period of time. This technique is even effective against the incredibly powerful Nitro beasts.

Yuda
The "Tray King," Yuda is the #5 ranked chef in the world and has his restaurant, "Tray King," located on the topmost floor of the Gourmet Tower Knife building. Yuda is renowned for being able to cook without creating "one millimeter" of distortion, and he often refers to things as being within one millimeter. Yuda is also considered one of the greatest authorities on medical cooking. Among his medical skills are preparing food that optimize "Food Immersion" and being the only chef who knows the recipe for mochi to cure the diseased "Green Rain" from the Gourmet World. Yuda himself is a very tall, slim man with a gaunt face and long, red-brown hair and mustache that hang down to his waist. His mustache is parted to hang over his shoulders. His clothes resemble dark green track clothes, with Japanese characters on the front. The cooking at "Tray King" resembles Chinese and Japanese cuisine, with a large number of traditional dishes such as dumplings and yakisoba, as well as large, round Chinese-style dinner tables for customers. According to Toriko, Yuda has enough physical power to fight off beasts with capture levels around 100. Yuda has also won the international chef competition "Cooking Fest" 2 times and carries around a long, ornate Western-style sword dubbed the "All-Purpose Medicine Blade."

- 1 Millimeter Thousand Cuts: Using the "All-Purpose Medicine Blade," Yuda makes one quick slash that dices enemies into incredibly small pieces.
- Resurrection Cut: Using his Medicine Blade, Yuda cuts his body and revives himself. It is not clear if this technique heals Yuda or just resuscitates him.

Anyo Jr.
The "Young Dessert Prince," Anyo Jr. is the 6th ranked chef in the world. Anyo is famous for his desserts, sold at his restaurant "Prince". Anyo is a gorgeous young man with neck-length blond hair, held in place by a tiara.

- Sweetness Seasoning - Sugar Curtain: Out of sugar, Anyo creates a large curtain that can obscure the opponent's vision and also block attacks, especially if there are particle-based or airborne.

CM Goron
CM Goron, the 7th ranked chef and owner of the restaurant "Free Taste" and is described as "Shocking Original Cuisine." Goron's food is famous for having unknown flavors and Goron himself is rumored to taste food from the future. His hair is multi-colored and spiky and Goron wears a dark visor, as well as a nose pin.
Pipi
The "Genius Bread Artisan," Pipi is the 8th ranked chef in the world and the owner of the bakery "Pipi." Her bread is so well desired around the world that there are seven-year reservations for her bakery. Pipi herself is a short woman with an oval-head, with pigtails and bread-shaped blushes on her cheeks.

- Angel Yeast - Hidden Room: Using her bread-baking abilities, Pipi creates a large house out of special "angel yeast" bread. Those inside the house cannot be seen by those outside.

Kurakage
The "Ramen Master," Kurakage is the 9th ranked chef in the world and owner of the ramen shop "Kurakage," which has annual profits of 20 billion yen. Kurakage is a muscular man with slicked-back red hair held in place by a floral-print headband and war paint under his left eye.
Sumire
Nicknamed "Cafeteria Granny," Sumire is the cafeteria manager at the "Nakaume Cooking School's" cafeteria and recently became the #10 ranked chef in the world. Sumire is a short, elderly woman with curly hair in very plain, cafeteria clothes. When Toriko and Coco found Ichiryuu's "Hors D'Œuvre" ingredient in the president's Full Course Menu, she was one of the few chefs shown to "hear the voice" of the ingredient.
Mitsurou
The "Sweets Magician," Mitsurou is the 11th ranked chef in the world and owner of the cake shop, "Magic Honey." Mitsurou is a short old man with an odd, oblong face and buckteeth.
Klamaran
The "Young Ethnic King," Klamaran is the 12th ranked chef in the world and owner of the restaurant "Nostalgia." Klamaran's food is known for combining the tastes of numerous different ethnicities. Klamaran's most striking feature is incredibly long pink hair that wraps around his head and falls down his shoulders.
Horis
"Skewer User" and "Three Eyes" Horis is the 13th ranked chef in the world and manager of the shish-kebob restaurant "Mistu Kushi." Horis has three eyes, which allows him to cook faster and reportedly can grill hundreds of shish-kebobs at once. Horis covers his three eyes with a special pair of sunglasses, and also has a full beard and long black hair.

- Three-Eyes Light Speed Skewer Strike: Horis instantly throws a huge quantity of shish-kebob skewers at a target and pierces their body, inflicting enormous damage and even killing high capture level beasts.

Wabutora
The "Oil User," Wabutora is the 14th ranked chef in the world and the chef at the deep frying restaurant "Oil King." Wabutora has dark skin, a bald head, and long earlobes. Along with his skill and acclaim as a chef, Wabutora is also an author of multiple books on cooking oil.

- Secret Technique: Oil Field Deep Fry: Using his oil, Wabutora completely deep fries a target in a quick period of time, cooking them to a nice golden brown.

Chiru, the 15th ranked chef in the world.
Yuuji
The "Hormone Master," Yuuji is the 16th ranked chef in the world and manager of the eight-star Japanese-style grill "Mogura," which is located in the Gourmet Alley in downtown Gourmet Town. Yuuji has a tight, mole-like face, with a small mustache and beard.
Livebearer
Voiced by: Akio Otsuka (TV series)
The leader of the Underground Cooking World, former owner of the Gourmet Casino, and 17th ranked chef in the world. Livebearer is an enormous man with a long chin and constantly smiling face. Under his clothes, Livebearer's body is covered in tattoos, and has short blond hair that appears to just be a wig covering the signs of implants into his brain. Livebearer also has a digital port on the back of his head for accessing Memory Data, so he can experience the sensation of eating foods that have been stored from his or other people's memory data. As the owner of the Gourmet Casino, Livebearer tries to collect VIP customers to then challenge for their memories, beating them at a rigged game of Concentration called Gourmet Tasting, where contestants are forced to eat poisonous ingredients, and if they cannot, they lose. Livebearer is able to eat all of the poisonous and narcotic ingredients in the Gourmet Casino, and can turn off his sense of pain and coat his entire digestive tract with biodegradable plastic to make it easier. After losing to Toriko and Coco and being inspired by Komatsu's cooking talent, Livebearer has revoked his ways and has given ownership of the Casino to the Gourmet Yakuza, and is now running the Jidar Kingdom with them.

- Brain Cut: Using a large cleaver/cooking knife, Livebearer makes a series of quick and targeted slashes across the head of an opponent.

Reishun
The "Chinese Emperor," Reishun is the 18th ranked chef in the world and manager of the 10-star Chinese restaurant "Rei." Reishun wears traditional a Chinese robe and hat and also has long black hair and has a piercing stare.
Tairan
Known as "Poison Cooking" Tairan, he is the #19 ranked chef in the world and is called both a "genius" chef and the unrivaled expert on poisons who manages the restaurant "Poison Nest." Tairan is a dark-skinned man with a faint beard and his face is covered in scars. His cooking uniform is a traditional white chef's outfit, but with large, dark crosses on his arms, hat, and apron. Tairan is from a non-IGO affiliated nation and has the expertise to even hold off the spread of disease from "Green Rain" for hours.

- Detox Knife: Tairan makes incredibly quick slashes with his kitchen knife, seemingly performing a form of "poison Knocking" on the target.

Gen
The "Revolutionary Old Man of Stew," Gen, referred to as "Gen-chan," is the 21st ranked chef in the world. Gen is the owner of the oden shop "Gen-chan" and his restaurant reportedly gets wait lines 20 kilometers long. Gen is a short old man with a giant mustache the size of his head.

- Addendum Soup: Gen shoots a soup onto the nose or face of an opponent, causing them to pass out. It is not revealed on what level the attack works, but Gen says that the soup he throws is from the time of his great-great-great-great-grandfather.

Lulubhu
The 22nd ranked chef in the world, Lulubhu is the owner of the seven-star traditional Japanese restaurant "Guts," which is located in the Gourmet Tower. Lulubhu is a short old man with bushy white eyebrows that obscure his eyes and an equally bushy white mustache.
Kopuriko
The "Bizarre Food Queen," Kopuriko is the 24th ranked chef in the world and owner of the restaurant "Harawata," which is described as serving "bizarre food." Kopuriko is a dark-skinned woman with long red hair, with no clothes besides a reptile-like animal attached to her head and claws covering her breasts, as well as a purple skirt, a necklace made of intestines, and bracelets made out of brain.

- Guillotine Slice: Kopuriko makes a series of thin and sharp slices with incredible speed which can chop through even high-leveled beasts. It is not revealed if Kopuriko uses a kitchen knife, her body, or some other weapon for this technique.

Darin
"Giant Cuisine" Darin is the 25th ranked chef in the world and owner of the restaurant "Jumbo Food," which serves gigantic food. Darin is a towering, bulky figure, with strong forearms and an ogre-like face.
Koyubi
The "Singer Chef," Koyubi is the 26th ranked chef in the world. Koyubi is a dark skinned man with a butt chin and thick mustache who dresses and styles his hair in a similar fashion to Elvis Presley. Along with his appearance and nickname, Koyubi is a fan of singing and wants to be well known for his music. However, the emcee of "Cooking Fest" pointed out that he has no fans as a singer and implied that his singing is actually quite bad.
Appolo
The "Space Cuisine Pioneer," Appolo is the 27th ranked chef in the world and the top authority in cooking ingredients from space. Appolo wears a spacesuit seemingly at all times and has red dreadlocks. Appolo is also a member of NEO, the organization that opposes both the IGO and the Bishoku-kai.
Mami
The "Undersea Restaurant Pioneer," Mami is the 29th ranked chef in the world and owner of the undersea restaurant, "Ryuuguu Tower." Mami is a small, dark-skinned man with bug eyes, long blond hair, and bandages wrapped around his face. Mami is described as a reclusive chef who rarely appears in public by the emcee of "Cooking Fest." He is in a combo with another deep-sea expert bishoku-ya, Mammy.
Rikiya
The "Nigiri Master," Rikiya is the 30th ranked chef in the world and chef at the sushi restaurant "Ouki," which has been around for 300 years. Rikiya is a large, stout man with a small mustache and a large, complex scar on the right side of his face.
Tsurara
Voiced by: Kaoru Morota (TV series)
"Mama" Tsurara is the 31st ranked chef in the world and owner of the snack bar, "Tsurara." She is a tall, elegant woman in traditional Japanese geisha clothing and make-up, with a beauty mark under her lips. Tsurara has skill in psychological manipulation, getting a Surprise Apple to level 20 simply by threatening it.

- Tsurara Mama's Slight Intoxication Pickling: Using a small amount of alcohol, Tsurara intoxicates an enemy and pickles its body, causing it to become incapacitated instantly.

Ton
"Mach Cooking" Ton is the 33rd ranked chef in the world and is considered the speed master of the Gourmet Age. Ton has tall, blond hair and a long nose, with Spartan-like armor covering his body and safety pins in both of his temples. He prides himself in speed, not only in terms of cooking, but also in terms of physical speed, coming ahead of even the deep-sea expert Mami in the swimming portion of "Cooking Fest's" triathlon.
Kamizaru
The "Soba Hermit," Kamizaru is the 34th ranked chef in the world. Kamizaru is an incredibly old man with a flat, wrinkled face and a long white beard and eyebrows. Going with his hermit nickname, Kamizaru gives out philosophical advice to chefs.
Makubee
The "Onigiri General," Makubee is the 38th ranked chef in the world. Makubee is a very large, muscular man whose arms are as long as his entire body. He also has short black hair, tiny eyes, and a small, simple mustache. Makubee was talented enough and strong enough to rank in the top 30 chefs at the 50th "Cooking Fest" but was suddenly killed by a Nitro brought by the Bishoku-kai.
Granny Kamma
The "Miso Soup Granny" and 54th ranked chef in the world, Granny Kamma is a short, old woman with a worn face and ratty black hair that hangs over her face. She has an incredibly creepy personality that even unnerves powerful, high-ranking chefs.
Nerimaru
"Super Gutsy Udon" Nerimaru is the 56th ranked chef in the world and a master at kneading not only dough for udon noodles, but all foods. Nerimaru is a large man with a sumo wrestler's build, complemented by the sumo strap across his waist. Nerimaru also has black dreadlocks and very narrow eyes.
Ahn
"Smoke Master" Ahn is the 73rd ranked chef in the world. He is a lanky, elderly man, with white hair, a big white mustache, and thick white eyebrows obscuring his eyes. He also wears a long jacket covered with clips for cigars and always has a cigar in his mouth. Using his cigars, he can also create a thick smokescreen for protection.

=== Other characters ===
Terry Cloth (テリークロス, Terīkurosu)
A Battle Wolf pup that has been adopted by Toriko, he sees Toriko as a parental figure, a big surprise since Battle Wolves never become attached to humans, but is probably connected to Toriko showing the pup warmth and kindness following his mother's heroic sacrifice. It is implied that Terry is genetically related to a legendary Battle Wolf that saved the world from an overpopulated species of massive herbivore that devoured entire forests. Terry got his name from how Toriko described his fur. Only few foods suit his taste, such as Gourmet World's foods.
Acacia (アカシア, Akashia)
Voiced by: Hideyuki Tanaka (Japanese); Chuck Huber (TV series) (English)
The greatest bishoku-ya in human history and the main antagonist of the series, he discovered countless ingredients all over the world, including the Phantom Jellyfish from which he discovered the Gourmet Cells, and is the first and only person to find the ingredient GOD. Using GOD, he manages to end a centuries-long war between all the nations of the world, and bring about the current Gourmet Age. Acacia also discovered the creatures known as "Nitro" in the Gourmet World, and by studying them, found the way to obtain "GOD". Acacia took three disciples: Ichiryū, the current president of the IGO, the "Knocking Master" Jirō, and Midora, the boss of the Bishoku-kai. Little else is known about Acacia, but he seems to have formed a combo with the chef Frohze. Acacia is eventually revealed to be alive in Area 1, where he has been entirely taken over by his Appetite Demon, the Demon King Neo. He eventually regains control and reveals his true nature, being a villainous glutton who seeks to eat the planet himself, going so far as to devour Neo to ensure no one else could taste the fully matured planet. During the final battle it is revealed that Acacia was only pretending to be evil, and everything he did was part of his and Frohze's plan to defeat Neo by feeding him raw hate and rage until he vomited up everything he had ever eaten, thus restoring untold millions of extinct ingredients and animals to the world, as well as reviving everyone he had ever eaten.

Full Course Menu:

Hors d'oeuvre: CENTER
Soup: PAIR
Fish Dish: ANOTHER
Meat Dish: NEWS
Main: GOD
Salad: AIR
Dessert: EARTH
Drink: ATOM
Frohze
The legendary chef, called the "Chef God", who formed a combo with the equally famous bishoku-ya, Acacia, Frohze has short black hair with no other notable facial attributes other than her elegance. Little else is known about her, but it is safe to assume that she also aided in the capturing and cooking of the ingredients in Acacia's Full-Course Menu, including GOD. She is believed to have died standing over a cutting board with her knife gripped firmly in her hand. Melk the First said that the knife of Frohze is one of the few knives he got a shock from after seeing.

- Cinderella: A slightly long and beautiful kitchen knife that fits easily in the hand and has a considerable luster and sharpness. Its handle appears to be made out of some sort of well crafted material. It is now wielded by Joa.

Nono
The only disciple and staff member working for the chef Setsuno, Nono is a young woman with short blond hair with an apron and heart-themed clothing like Setsuno. Little is known about her, but she has considerable power, and was able to freeze over the entire very warm Pot Pond instantly.
Melk the Second
Voiced by: Akiko Yajima (Japanese); Martha Harms (TV series) (English)
A Gourmet craftsman, she is the disciple and adopted daughter of the top knife maker and knife sharpener in the world, Melk the First. She is a slender young-looking woman, and was confused to be a man when first meeting Toriko and Komatsu. She also told them that she was the original Melk, but Toriko figured out that this is not the real Melk due to the age difference and the fact that she would not be able to defeat a high level beast to get materials for the knives. She originally had little confidence about her abilities in sharpening, despite being noted as a prodigy by Melk the first. After Komatsu proved to her how good her knives were however, she became confident in her abilities and combined Komatsu's old, broken knife with the legendary Darous fang. She appeared flustered when she saw Komatsu in his underwear, and when he saw her naked, possibly hinting towards a crush on Komatsu.

Techniques:

- Scale Cut (Uroko Giri): A move used by Melk with her knives, it was first used on a Scale Kong to remove most of its scales from a few meters away.
- Grindstone Boots: Melk's boots act as grindstones, so if her knives get damaged in battle, she can quickly re-sharpen them so she can continue to fight.

Monchy
A sushi craftsman who is considered a fortune teller on the same level as Coco, Monchy is a stout man who has long black hair but covers his face with a mask that looks like those worn by Mexican Lucha wrestlers. Unlike Coco, however, Mnochy does not divine information on people, but ingredients. By making an "Ehou Maki," an uncut sushi roll that people eat during festivals to point them towards good fortune, Monchy can point people towards ingredients they are looking for. However, depending on the quality of the ingredient one is looking for, the components of the Ehou Maki will have to be correspondingly high-quality. Monchy also has a habit of calling people "moron" repeatedly. Monchy is one of five siblings, all of which are quintuplets and wear a mask just like Monchy's. Monchy creates the "Ehou Maki", by throwing the ingredients into a wrestling ring and "fighting" with them in a fashion similar to professional wrestling, including hurling insults and using steel chairs.
Tom (十夢, Tomu)
Voiced by: Kenjirō Tsuda (VOMIC), Keiji Fujiwara (OVA), Tetsuya Kakihara (Japanese); Jerome 57 (TV series) (English)
A ship captain and old friend of Toriko's, he can tell how much someone weighs the moment they set foot on his ship. He sells ingredients captured by Toriko.
Kiss (キッス, Kissu)
An Emperor Crow (a long thought extinct bird) that lives with Coco and is Coco's family. Since Coco's home is on a pillar with no stairs, Kiss is the only way for him to reach it.
Rikky (リッキー, Rikkī)
A large mammal beast Mansam keeps, called a Hayanpanter. Rikky is surprisingly obedient to Mansam. Rikky's favorite food is Horohoro Parfait. Its capture level is 31.
Nitro
A mysterious creature from the gourmet world that Acacia spent a lot of time studying. The GT-Robos are modeled after the Nitros appearance. Nitros appear to be apex predators within the Gourmet World, with no known natural enemies. Despite not being much bigger than a normal human, they have inhuman speed and strength. They also demonstrate high levels of intelligence and have demonstrated rational thought on several occasions. Nitros also appear to possess incredible recuperative and regenerative capabilities. So powerful are Nitros, that even Toriko and Zebra teamed together could barely defeat one that was already greatly weakened by centuries of imprisonment inside the Gourmet Pyramid. The Bishoku-kai appears to have tamed a number of feral Nitro and have used them to fight and capture powerful World Ranking chefs. They were originally a powerful civilization that spanned all over the Gourmet World, but mysteriously vanished. It is also revealed that most sentient species in the Gourmet World lived as slaves to the Nitro, and that a class system existed where Blue Nitro ruled over Red Nitro and all other species by mutilating the slave races' bodies to ensure subservience. Following the collapse of their civilization, it seems Red Nitro, deprived of their vocal chords, regressed to feral, solitary hunter-gatherers. The remaining civilized Blue Nitro, the Gourmet Nobles, now serve the Demon King Neo and assist him in his plans to cook the Earth until they can seal him away. This plan ultimately fails and all but the Nitro named PAIR are killed and/or eaten.

== Anime-only characters ==
The following characters were developed for the anime series.

=== Tina ===
Voiced by: Nana Mizuki (Japanese); Morgan Garrett (English)

Tina (ティナ) is a television reporter, and host of the program "Gourmet News." She sums up the various creatures Toriko encounters at the end of the episode and previews the next one. She follows Toriko in order to get a scoop on the various rare ingredients he encounters. She also has a Carrier Balloon Pigeon named Cruppo. She has a short temper and likes to criticize people, but has a crush on Toriko, whom she wants to interview. She makes a small cameo appearance on chapter 145 (lower left corner of page 2.)

=== Others ===
Peck (ペック, Pekku)
Voiced by: Kaori Momoi
A young boy who appears in the film "Gourmet Adventure".
Safla (サフラ, Safura)
Voiced by: Eri Sendai
Safla is young bishokuya who is in a combo with her brother Cumin. Their father was a close friend of Toriko. She also has an animal partner named Babu, that is a large beast known as a Bubble Knuckle.
Cumin (クミン, Kumin)
Voiced by: Yasuhiro Takato
Cumin is a young chubby chef who is in a combo with his sister Safla. Their father was a close friend of Toriko. Despite his skill he believes he is not as skilled as his late father.
