= List of The Disastrous Life of Saiki K. characters =

The manga series The Disastrous Life of Saiki K. features an extensive cast of characters created by Shūichi Asō.

== Saiki family ==
Kusuo Saiki (斉木 楠雄, Saiki Kusuo)

Voiced by: Shintarō Asanuma (vomic, flash anime), Hiroshi Kamiya (TV anime), (Japanese); Jerry Jewell (season 1); Kyle McCarley (Reawakened) (English)
The main character of the series. He is a high school student who was born with all manners of psychic abilities despite having very ordinary biological parents. Because of the misery that comes from the attention he receives as a psychic, Kusuo desires a normal, plain life, purposefully keeping average grades and performance in sports activities. He uses telepathy to read people's minds, and can share this power with others. His other abilities include telekinesis, levitation, x-ray vision,^{Ch. P1} clairvoyance,^{Ch. P6} astral projection,^{Ch. P7} pyrokinesis,^{Ch. 2} mind control,^{Ch. 10} psychometrics,^{Ch. 17} invisibility,^{Ch. 20} and more. He can teleport objects, but has to replace the item with something of equal value.^{Ch. P5} He can also temporarily pick up other psychic abilities, such as Toritsuka's ability to see ghosts, by making physical contact.^{Ch. 18} He has dark pink hair,^{Ch. 10} with two antennae on his head that people think are hair ornaments, but they actually regulate his constantly growing powers that would otherwise go out of control and destroy things as well as cause global catastrophes.^{Ch. 23, 59} He can transform into animals or into a girl that he names Kusuko (Voiced by: Haruka Tomatsu).^{Ch. 37, 79} Kusuo wears glasses so that his gaze does not turn someone to stone.^{Ch. 71-72} His favorite snack is coffee jelly.^{Ch. 27} He is vulnerable to bugs, especially cockroaches, (Note: The author notes that he too is terrified of cockroaches.^{Vol. 7 author's note}) because he cannot read their minds and predict their actions.^{Ch. 15}
His family name is pronounced like psyche and is based on the English word psychic.
Kuniharu Saiki (斉木 國春, Saiki Kuniharu)
Voiced by: Mitsuo Iwata (Japanese); Chuck Huber (season 1); Michael Sinterniklaas (Reawakened) (English)
Kusuo's father, who has to suck up to his employers so much that he has gained a taste for licking shoes.^{Ch. 1} He works as an editor for a manga publishing company that appears to be a knock-off of Shueisha.^{Ch. 62}
Kurumi Saiki (斉木 久留美, Saiki Kurumi)
Voiced by: Rikako Aikawa (Japanese); Morgan Lauré Garrett (season 1); Tara Sands (Reawakened) (English)
Kusuo's mother, whom he states is "the one who keep him from turning into dark side" because of her kindness. However, she can be scary when needed so that Kusuo will not be able to defy her.^{Ch. 1} She is allergic to cats.^{Ch. 36} Her maiden name is also Saiki.^{Ch. 92} She can be rather naive and air-headed at times.^{Ch. 133}
Kusuo's grandparents
Voiced by: Koichi Yamadera (Kumagoro) and Rie Tanaka (Kumi)
Kumagoro Saiki and Kumi Saiki are Kusuo's maternal grandparents. Kumagoro has a classic tsundere personality, in which he is hard on the outside, but soft on the inside. He is very fond of his daughter, but dislikes his son-in-law, often beating him up or sending him away to run errands. He wants to get to know his grandson better. Kumi acts fairly young for her age, with her choice of fashionable clothes and her gyaru (gal) speech.^{Ch. 92-94, 116} In the anime they were voiced by Koichi Yamadera and Rie Tanaka who were a real-life married couple at the time.
Kusuke Saiki (斉木 空助, Saiki Kūsuke)
Voiced by: Kenji Nojima (Japanese); Chris Patton (season 1); Joe Zieja (Reawakened) (English)
Kusuo's older brother. He is a super genius who invents devices and machines, but lacks psychic abilities and thus always loses in any sort of competition with his brother. When he was 14, he moved to England where he has been a doctoral candidate at Cambridge University. He invents a "telepathy canceler" so that Kusuo cannot read his thoughts.^{Ch. 103-107} After graduating from university, he moves in with his grandparents.^{Ch. 160}

== PK Academy ==
Riki Nendo (燃堂 力, Nendō Riki)
Voiced by: Kenta Miyake (vomic, flash anime), Daisuke Ono (Japanese); David Wald (season 1); Jason Charles Miller (Reawakened) (English)
A large, muscular student with a Mohawk hairstyle, a scar over his left eye and a cleft chin. Nendo is the only student at PK Academy whose mind Saiki cannot read, simply because he is dumb. As such, Saiki often fears his overly friendly and carefree nature as he cannot predict his actions.^{Ch. 2} However, Nendo is fond of Saiki and considers him his best buddy. His family members have the same faces as him, with his late father with a scar over his right eye instead of Riki's left, and his mother Midori with scars over both eyes.^{Ch. P4, 16, 46} He has a horrible singing voice.^{Ch. 90}
He is named after nendōryoku (念動力) which is the Japanese term for psychokinesis.
Shun Kaido (海藤 瞬, Kaidō Shun)
Voiced by: Takuya Eguchi (vomic, flash anime), Nobunaga Shimazaki (Japanese); Micah Solusod (season 1); Zach Aguilar (Reawakened) (English)
A classmate who calls himself "The Jet-Black Wings" (漆黒の翼, Shikkoku no Tsubasa), thinking he is secretly living as a rebel in a fantasy world ruled by an evil conspiracy organization called Dark Reunion. He slowly builds normal relationships with his schoolmates despite his frequently recurring chūnibyō antics.^{Ch. P6, 3} His mother is very strict when it comes to his schoolwork.^{Ch. 51, 105} Kaido has low physical stamina and strength, as shown in several stories.^{Ch. 48, 86, 106, 112} He also has a fear of water and possesses no sense of direction.^{Ch. 74} Shun has a younger sister who is fairly serious, and a little brother who idolizes him.^{S2 ep 17}
He is named after shunkan idō (瞬間移動) which is the Japanese term for teleportation.
Kokomi Teruhashi (照橋 心美, Teruhashi Kokomi)
Voiced by: Ai Kayano (Japanese); Tia Ballard (season 1); Kayli Mills (Reawakened) (English)
A self-proclaimed beautiful girl who is part of Saiki's class. She acts modest in public as that increases her appeal, but secretly loves the attention that is lavished upon her and all the favors that the guys are willing to do for her. She has the favor of the gods when it comes to events of chance. When Saiki does not treat her like a queen bee, and even ignores her, she becomes obsessed with making him react or show admiration, like saying "Oh wow" (おっふ, Offu) at her.^{Ch. 5, 13, 29, 54} She has a fan club called the Kokomins.^{Ch. 101} In later chapters, it is revealed that her charisma and beauty does not affect guys who strongly love someone else (Kuniharu), those with pure eyes that view everyone equally (Hairo), or those who can see her true nature (Kusuo and his brother Kusuke). Her one weakness is with little kids such as Yūta who exhibit all three of those characteristics.^{Ch. 87} In one of the chapters, it is shown she harbors a list of things that people should never say to her.^{Ch. 87} Despite being wooed by guys like Metori Saiko that fit her ideal financial expectations, she develops feelings of love for Saiki.^{Ch. 114-115} In the anime, she is typically coated in a golden glow.
Her family name is based on the Japanese gairaigo term for telepathy.
Kineshi Hairo (灰呂 杵志, Hairo Kineshi)
Voiced by: Satoshi Hino (Japanese); Kyle Phillips (season 1); Billy Kametz (Reawakened) (English)
Saiki's class representative is an overly hot-blooded, energetic, passionate student who enjoys sports and is constantly trying to get other people motivated.^{Ch. 6} He has bright red hair and typically wears a nasal strip. According to Saiki, as hard as he is on others, he is even harder on himself. Due to his nature, he is well-trusted by his classmates.^{Ch. 19} A running gag is that whenever he trips his shorts drop and his butt is exposed.^{Ch. 6, 24}
He is named after (パイロキネシス; Pairokineshisu), which is a Japanese gairaigo term for pyrokinesis.
Chiyo Yumehara (夢原 知予, Yumehara Chiyo)
Voiced by: Yukari Tamura (Japanese); Jill Harris (season 1); Ryan Bartley (Reawakened) (English)
Saiki's classmate who has a romanticized perspective on relationships despite having a history of poor choices of boyfriends.^{Ch. 109, 140, 162} She has short brown hair and wears a hairband. After failing to attract Saiki with her romantic comedy manga-like encounters, she dates the sweet-talking Takeru, but breaks up with him after she realizes he uses the same pick-up lines and other annoying habits.^{Ch. 5, 21} Chiyo becomes friends with Kokomi, but suspects they both have crushes on Saiki.^{Ch. 54} Her attention is diverted to Shun Kaido, who saves her from being further belittled by some guys at the beach during the school trip, but who is oblivious that he is even in a relationship with her,^{Ch. 54, 60, 96} She joins the Occult Club because of him,^{Ch. 96} and becomes friends with Arisa where they dabble mostly in girl talk about relationships. After a Valentine's Day misunderstanding, she and Shun agree to remain friends instead of advancing the relationship. Chiyo is the subject of some side stories involving weight loss and obesity,^{Ch. 82, 123} Asō has mentioned he has been working hard to draw the girls to appeal to the seinen demographic.^{Ch. 56 notes}
She is named after yochimu (予知夢), which means precognitive dream in Japanese.
Reita Toritsuka (鳥束 零太, Toritsuka Reita)
Voiced by: Natsuki Hanae (Japanese); Joel McDonald (season 1); Kellen Goff (Reawakened) (English)
A medium and one of three people outside of Saiki's family to know of Saiki's abilities. He has the ability to see spirits, but is only interested in using his ability to attract girls (he is often chastised by Saiki as a perv) and to become rich. His guardian ghost is Nendo's late father.^{Ch. 18} He later lets other spirits possess his body.^{Ch. 52, 79} Toritsuka starts an Occult Club at school.^{Ch. 96} He works as an assistant at the temple. Aiura, Toritsuka, and Saiki constitute the "Psychic Trio" (anime: PK Academy Psychic Kids) at PK Academy, although Saiki objects to the characterization.
He is named after toritsukareta (取り憑かれた) which is Japanese for "be possessed".
Chisato Mera (目良 千里, Mera Chisato)
Voiced by: Maaya Uchida (Japanese); Megan Shipman (English)
A glasses-wearing classmate of Saiki's who works multiple jobs to make ends meet, including part-time at a cafe that Saiki frequents.^{Ch. 47} A running gag is that she craves free food, and binge eats whenever she can.^{Ch. 57-58, 97}
She was named after senrigan (千里眼) which is the Japanese term for clairvoyance.
Aren Kuboyasu (窪谷須 亜蓮, Kuboyasu Aren)
Voiced by: Yoshimasa Hosoya (Japanese); Jarrod Greene (season 1); Kaiji Tang (Reawakened) (English)
A transfer student with rectangular-framed glasses and purple hair^{Vol. 9 author's notes} who used to be a delinquent in his former school. He was a gang leader for many years, following the footsteps of his parents who were also delinquents. He tries to put his past behind him by being calm and collected, yet has a short temper whenever he sees bullying or whenever someone is being rude to him, causing him to still start fights a lot.^{Ch. 65-66} He also has a great interest in motorcycles.
He was named after "Clairvoyance(X-ray vision)"
Metori Saiko (才虎 芽斗吏, Saiko Metori)
Voiced by: Masaya Matsukaze (Japanese); Adam Gibbs (season 1); Ray Chase (Reawakened) (English)
A rich and smug descendant of the top-notch Saiko Conglomerate who later transfers to PK Academy and ends up falling in love with Kokomi. She declines his offer to be his girlfriend because she still likes Saiki.^{Ch. 114-115} At first, he resents Saiki, but grows to be less smug and genuinely cares about his peers as friends.^{Ch. 137-138}
He was named after "Psychometry"
Imu Rifuta (梨歩田 依舞, Rifuta Imu)
Voiced by: M.A.O
A pretty first-year student with light hair and pigtails who has a strong desire for recognition and takes pride in her appearance to charm the boys, however, she realizes she does not match up to Kokomi.^{Ch. 143} She initially shows interest in Saiki in order to upstage Kokomi. Saiki had hoped for the same so that the two girls would eventually leave him alone, but it did not work out.^{Ch. 149} However, Imu discovers she was actually jealous of Saiki due to Kokomi's attraction to him, and realizes she likes Kokomi herself instead. ^{S2 ep 12} However, she was afraid that her attraction, which in combination with beauty of Kokomi would drive her to "switch sides." For this reason, she wanted to find a boyfriend. When she saw Kokomi's brother, she settles for becoming his fan instead.^{S2 ep 16, 22}
She was named after "Time leap".
Mikoto Aiura (相卜 命, Aiura Mikoto)
Voiced by: Eri Kitamura (Japanese); Faye Mata (English)
A gyaru with lime-blonde hair, tan skin, and big breasts who transfers to Saiki's class. She is a fortune teller who can read the future and determine someone's love compatibility, often accompanied with spontaneous gestures and movements that she makes up to get her in the mood. Saiki realizes her powers are for real after she accurately assesses his classmates. She can read people's auras, although Saiki's aura is so intense that she cannot read his.^{Ch. 162-163} She transfers to PK Academy in order to find her soulmate from a psychic vision, who is revealed to be Saiki. After Saiki is forced to reveal his powers to her in order to save Chiyo, she agrees to keep his powers a secret. She, Saiki, and Toritsuka constitute a "psychic trio" (anime: PK Academy Psychic Kids), much to Saiki's initial dismay (though he eventually grows fond of her by the end of the series).^{S2 ep 11} She dislikes Toritsuka.
Touma Akechi (明智透真, Akechi Touma)
Voiced by: Yuki Kaji (Japanese); Bryce Papenbrook (English)
A transfer student with light brown hair in a bowl cut.^{Ch. 210}^{S2 ep 18} He speaks very quickly and can ramble for minutes without stopping. He knows Kusuo from elementary school, and suspects that he is a psychic after he had been bullied multiple times by a student named Takashi and then rescued by Kusuo. He has very keen observation skills, to the extent that Kusuo initially thought him to also be a psychic. When he is nervous he wets himself. Kusuo eventually tells him his secret in order to keep his identity from becoming widely known.^{S2 ep 22-23}
He was named after tōmei (透明) which means "Invisible" in Japanese.

== Minor PK Academy characters ==
Takahashi (高橋)
Voiced by: Taishi Murata (Japanese); Travis Mullenix (English)
A frequent side character with green curly hair. In one of the one-shot stories, he acts like a delinquent to frame Riki Nendo for stealing the class treasury money. He also fakes being sick to skip the School Year Opening Ceremony and then puts the blame on Nendō and Kusuo. He also gets into convoluted schemes with his circle of friends and becomes a nuisance to deal with.
Matsuzaki (松崎)
Voiced by: Taro Yamaguchi (Japanese); Bryan Massey (English)
A gym teacher and school guidance counselor. A strict but kind teacher that everyone fears, but is liked by Saiki because he frequently keeps Saiki's school life at peace as he keeps people from troubling Saiki.^{Ch. 2, 37}
Arisu Makino
Voiced by: Nozomi Furuki (Japanese); Apphia Yu (English)
A schoolmate who joins the Occult Club. Her dark hair covers her face, although when Toritsuka checks she is not really a hidden beauty.^{Ch. 96}
Hiroshi Satou
Voiced by: Kenshō Ono
A classmate whom Saiki desires to be like as he is average in looks, grades, behavior, but most importantly, is very low-profile and does not stand out.^{Ch. 181} He is a member of the Baseball Club.
Jouten Makano
The head of the Newspaper Club who starts appearing after Kusuo and the gang return from the island. She tries to smear Kokomi Teruhashi by taking and editing photos to make Kokomi look bad, but her actions often backfire thanks to Kusuo's meddling.^{Ch. 156}
Takumi Iguchi
Voiced by: Kohsuke Toriumi (Japanese); Christopher Bevins (English)
A homeroom teacher who has a face of a pervert when he smiles. He is well-intended.^{S3 ep 3}
Hii Suzumiya
Voiced by: Nao Tōyama (Japanese); Brianna Knickerbocker (English)
A transfer student who starts appearing during Saiki's third year. She is extremely accident prone and unlucky, and her bad luck affects everyone around her, except for the very average Satou, who seems to turn his bad luck into good luck.^{S3 ep 4} In a later episode, the Psychic Trio is able to get Hii's guardian spirit cleaned up.^{S3 ep 5}

== Others ==
Uryoku Chono (蝶野 雨緑, Chōno Uryoku)
Voiced by: Showtaro Morikubo (Japanese); Austin Tindle (English)
A street magician who performs with his partner Michael. He sometimes relies on Saiki to help him with his magic tricks.^{Ch. P3, 14} His real name is Kōta Nakanishi (中西 宏太, Nakanishi Kōta)^{Ch. 15} Two years prior, Chono used to work for a publishing company when he met Nendo's mother, but they divorced after he lost his job and did not pick up any further work prior to becoming a magician. He also does public performances like circus acts to scheme a way to win Nendo's mom heart back but only with little to no success^{Ch. 46}
He was named after "超能力(chō nōryoku) which means "psychic ability" in Japanese.
Nendo's parents
Voiced by: Daisuke Ono (Japanese); David Wald (English)
Nendo's late father appears as a ghost. His face is similar to the latter, except his vertical scar is on the right eye instead of the left. He is the guardian ghost for Toritsuka. Because he is a ghost, he no longer maintains any memories of what he himself looks like or that he is related to the family.^{Ch. P4, 16, 46} Riki's mother, Midori, looks exactly like Riki, except she has a vertical scar over each of her eyes, and she has curly hair. She works multiple jobs; and had married Chono briefly.^{Ch. P4, 16, 46}
Amp (アンプ, Anpu)
Voiced by: Yoshitsugu Matsuoka (Japanese); Greg Ayres (English)
An arrogant street cat who was saved by Kusuo when he was trapped between two buildings.^{Ch. 36} After that, he got attached to Kusuo and, despite Kusuo's continuous rejections, started to frequents the Saiki House where Kusuo's father feeds him. He once got Kusuo, who was disguised as a cat known as Psi, to aid him in trying to woo a female cat Pushi. (Japanese voiced by Hisako Kanemoto; English by Dawn M. Bennett) Instead, Anpu was mistaken for a pervert and to make it worse she instead fell for Psi, the cat version of Kusuo. Pushi and Anpu now stay in front of Saiki's house. She waits for Psi to come around, while Anpu wants to fight Psi. ^{Ch. 49} Though Saiki usually finds Amp annoying, he changes his attitude toward him after Amp saved him from a cockroach while Saiki was shrunk down.^{Ch. 89}
Makoto Teruhashi (照橋 信, Teruhashi Makoto) / Touru Mugami (六神 通, Mugami Tōru)
Voiced by: Tomoaki Maeno (Japanese); Brandon McInnis (English)
Kokomi's older brother and a top teen actor with the stage name Toru Mugami. He has a serious sister complex and hates it when Saiki is near her.^{Ch. 41, 43}
Yūta Iridatsu (入達 遊太, Iridatsu Yūta)
Voiced by: Yumiko Kobayashi (Japanese); Bryn Apprill (English)
A five-year-old boy who first encounters Saiki Kusuo using his powers to get his balloon back. He is convinced that Saiki is his favorite comic book hero, Cyborg Cider-man Version 2. His family moves next door to the Saiki's.^{Ch. 53}
He was named after "幽体離脱(yūtai ridatsu)" which means "Astral Projection" in Japanese.

== Notes ==
- "Ch." is shortened form for chapter and refers to a chapter number of The Disastrous Life of Saiki K. manga. Chapters preceded with a P refer to the one-shots that were later collected in Volume 0.
