= Fangoria Blood Drive =

The Fangoria Blood Drive was a short-form horror film contest created by Fangoria and Koch Vision. The winners of the contest had their films released on a DVD compilation hosted by a genre celebrity. Fangoria: Blood Drive (2004) was hosted by rock star turned filmmaker Rob Zombie. Fangoria: Blood Drive II (2005) was hosted by MuchMusic VJ Mistress Juliya.

== Fangoria: Blood Drive (2004) Winners ==
Fangoria: Blood Drive
- Distributed by: Koch Vision
- Release date: June 8, 2004
- Running time: 119 min.
- Language: English

Note: This iteration alone included specific awards for each entry.

- Mr. Eryams by BC Furtney (Best Film)
- A Man and His Finger by Patrick Rea and Ryan Jones (Best Comedy)
- Disturbances by Patrick Rea (Most Frightening)
- The Hitch by Drew Rist (Palm d'Gore).
- Inside by Christopher P. Garetano (Best Avant Garde Horror)
- Song of the Dead by Chip Gubera (Best Musical)
- Shadows of the Dead by Joel Robertson (Best Editing)
- Specimen (Honorable Mention for Achievement in Special Effects) Not included on the DVD.

== Fangoria: Blood Drive II (2005) Winners ==
Fangoria: Blood Drive II
- Distributed by: Koch Vision
- Release date: October 4, 2005
- Running time: 83 min.
- Language: English

- Disposer by BC Furtney
- The Gibbering Horror of Howard Ghormley by Steve Daniels
- The Journal of Edmond Deyers by William Rot
- Mainstream by Adam Barnick
- Means to an End by Paul Solet and Jake Hamilton
- Sawbones by Brad Palmer
- We All Fall Down by Jake Kennedy
- Working Stiff by Erik A. Candiani

== Fangoria: Blood Drive Collection (2005) ==
Fangoria: Blood Drive Collection
- Distributed by: Koch Vision
- Release date: October 4, 2005
- Running time: 202 min.
- Language: English

This DVD contains all the films from both volumes.
