= The Case Study of Vanitas (TV series) =

Japanese anime television series

- ヴァニタスの手記(カルテ); Vanitasu no Karute
- Type: TV series
- Genre: Dark fantasy; Steampunk; Supernatural
- Based on: The Case Study of Vanitas by Jun Mochizuki
- Directed by: Tomoyuki Itamura
- Series composition: Deko Akao
- Character designer: Yoshiyuki Itō
- Music by: Yuki Kajiura
- No. of episodes: 24

Production
- Art director: Shingo Kanai
- Sound director: Kazuhiro Wakabayashi
- Cinematographer: Yingying Zhang
- Color designer: Izumi Takizawa
- Editors: Akane Shiraishi; Rie Matsubara
- Studio: Bones
- Producers: Hanako Akiyama; Narumi Odagiri; Shōta Komatsu
- Production companies: Aniplex; Bones; Contents Seed; Hakuhodo DY Music & Pictures; Square Enix

Original release
- Networks: Tokyo MX, GYT, GTV, BS11, MBS, CBC, HBC, RKB
- Release: July 3, 2021 – April 2, 2022

The Case Study of Vanitas (Japanese: ヴァニタスの手記(カルテ), Hepburn: Vanitasu no Karute) is a Japanese anime television series based on the manga series The Case Study of Vanitas by Jun Mochizuki. The story focuses on the young Vanitas who possesses the grimoire called The Book of Vanitas and uses it to heal cursed vampires. The vampire Noé Archiviste joins Vanitas in his quest to save cursed vampires. It was produced by Bones and directed by Tomoyuki Itamura. It was broadcast for 24 episodes from July 3, 2021, to April 2, 2022.

== Premise ==
During an airship ride to Paris, the vampire Noé Archiviste meets Vanitas, a human claiming to be a vampire doctor who cures vampires of the malnomen, which causes them to behave predatorily against their will. The book with which he heals, The Book of Vanitas, is connected to the original Vanitas, the Vampire of the Blue Moon, hated by the Vampires of the Red Moon who form the traditional vampire society. Noé and Vanitas join forces to heal vampires, but there lurks a threat of some unknown force named Charlatan, which may be responsible for corrupting the sick vampires.

== Production ==
The series was produced by Bones, and producer Naoki Amano oversaw all aspects of production. During scriptwriting, series composition writer Deko Akao divided the story into episodes. In the storyboard phase, which functions as the blueprint for the final animation, director Tomoyuki Itamura aimed to replicate as many of the manga's poses as possible in order to remain faithful to the source material. Nevertheless, the team sometimes took liberties, such as portraying a fight scene using silhouettes in the first episode. Itamura was careful to ensure that the storyboards for action sequences were visually appealing. When Vanitas uses his book, the colour artist Izumi Takizawa employed 3D animation with vivid colours to remain faithful to the manga.

The series is primarily set in Paris

Itamura noted that although a general distinction was difficult, he considered "shōjo manga-like" elements to occupy a significant portion of the series. He aimed to make scenarios and characters stylistically beautiful, which he considered necessary. To animate the setting accurately, the staff conducted research during a visit to Paris. He wanted to preserve the darkness and horror atmosphere of traditional vampire films in the anime. Because of their contrasting personalities, Vanitas and Noé were often kept apart and rarely framed together; Itamura was careful to avoid diminishing their charm by portraying them as too familiar with each other.

The protagonists Vanitas and Noé are voiced by Natsuki Hanae and Kaito Ishikawa, respectively, and their performances received positive responses. Itamura observed that both actors' performances complemented each other's characterisations: Hanae fully employed the cool, uncool, and sexy aspects of Vanitas, while Ishikawa excelled at conveying the reactions of the natural boke (straight man) character. Hanae was cast for his extensive experience and his ability to convey sex appeal even in simple lines such as "It's a secret". Inori Minase, who played Jeanne, noted that her character was unusual for her, as she had previously portrayed many protected characters rather than a defender. The scenes where Noé takes Dominique's blood and Jeanne takes Vanitas's blood were designed to emphasise sex appeal despite the characters being clothed, and music was used to convey an erotic atmosphere.

Vanitas also wears an hourglass-shaped earring. Upon first seeing it, writer Deko Akao inferred that it had a significant history, a notion that was later confirmed by Vanitas's backstory in the manga. Anime News Network observed that the earring reflected his mortality and short lifespan, which also conveyed the author's intended message.

== Release ==
The series was announced at AnimeJapan on March 28, 2021. It was produced by Bones and directed by Tomoyuki Itamura, with scripts overseen by Deko Akao and character designs by Yoshiyuki Ito. Yuki Kajiura composed the series' music. The series aired in two split cours, with the first cours airing from July 3 to September 18, 2021, on Tokyo MX and other channels. (Note: Tokyo MX listed the series premiere at 24:00 on July 2, 2021, which is effectively at midnight on July 3 JST.) The second cours aired from January 15 to April 2, 2022. The first opening theme is "Sora to Utsuro" by Sasanomaly, while the first ending theme is "0 (zero)" by LMYK. The second opening theme is "Your Name" by Little Glee Monster, while the second ending theme is "salvation" by Mononkul.

Funimation licensed the series outside of Asia. On August 5, 2021, Funimation announced the series would receive an English dub, which premiered the following day. Plus Media Networks Asia has licensed the series in Southeast Asia and released it on Aniplus Asia.

In Japan, the series was collected in a total of eight Blu-ray sets, released between October 27, 2021, and June 29, 2022. For the English release of the series, a Blu-ray containing the first half of the series was released on December 5, 2022, while the second half was released on January 30, 2024.

== Episodes ==
No.	Title (Note: All English titles are taken from Funimation.)	Directed by	Written by	Storyboarded by	Original release date
Part 1
1	"In the Event of Rusty Hopes"; Transliteration: "Vanitasu―Rasuti = Hōpusu no Baai―" (Japanese: Vanitas―ラスティ = ホープスの場合―)	Nao Miyoshi	Deko Akao	Tomoyuki Itamura	July 3, 2021
On an elaborately fitted airship kept aloft by "astermite", the vampire Noé Archiviste is bound for Paris where he hopes to assess the true nature of a legendary grimoire for his teacher called The Book of Vanitas. He meets a woman named Amelia Ruth, who is revealed as a vampire. Consumed by bloodlust, she bites him, poisoning his bloodstream. A man called Vanitas bursts in and uses The Book of Vanitas to reveal her true name, Florifel, which returns her to normal. Vanitas reveals that the grimoire removed the malady which is corrupting the names of vampires and causing them to become "curse-bearers" and go berserk. Later in the streets of Paris, Vanitas asks Noé to join him in his quest, but Noé resists and collapses in the street.
2	"In the City of Flowers"; Transliteration: "Noe―Hana no Miyako Nite―" (Japanese: Noé―花の都にて―)	Nao Miyoshi; Geisei Morita	Deko Akao	Tomoyuki Itamura	July 10, 2021
Vanitas and Noé languish in jail following the incident aboard the airship until they are summoned by Count Parks Orlok. He plans to execute Amelia, but Noé offers to capture a curse-bearer vampire currently terrorizing Paris and use the grimoire to save them. Dante sells Vanitas information to location of the vampire, but Johann warns him that Lord Ruthven's bourreau is in Paris. Vanitas and Noé find Thomas Breneux, the vampire from beyond the barrier who is attacking Parisiennes. Noé immobilizes him while Vanitas uses the grimoire to temporarily calm him down. However, the vampires Luca and Jeanne, the Hellfire Witch, arrive and demand the grimoire, believing that it is being used to create the curse-bearers. Noé refuses and Jeanne attacks him with the Crimson Gauntlet, but Noé and Vanitas escape. Later, Vanitas reveals to Noé that the grimoire can be also be used to create curse-bearers.
3	"Fangs That Lay Bare Blood"; Transliteration: "Arushivisuto―Chi o Abaku Kiba―" (Japanese: Archiviste―血を暴く牙―)	Seung-hui Son	Deko Akao	Katsumi Terahigashi	July 17, 2021
Jeanne demands The Book of Vanitas, but she is suddenly attacked from behind by a huge wolf-like monster. His malnomen is Loup-Garou. Vanitas activates the grimoire to change Thomas Breneux back into his human form, whose real name is Bucolicus. Although almost incapacitated, Jeanne still wants to fight Vanitas, but Noé emerges from the shadows holding Luca prisoner. Vanitas then surprisingly kisses her and declares his love. Outraged, Jeanne grabs Luca and leaves. Meanwhile, Nox and Manet find Breneux dead. He was attacked by Charlatan, the vampiric monster who had corrupted his name. Following Vanitas' demonstration of the grimoire's power, Orlok grants a stay of execution of Amelia, who is assigned to work as a maid at Hotel Chouchou. Noé bites Amelia's arm to read her memories, and he sees a parade of demons and Charlatan. Dominique de Sade arrives and claps a chain around Noé's neck. She leads him towards a hidden doorway to the barrier within Orlok's facility and reveals that Lord Ruthven will be appearing that night at a masquerade ball. As they cross the barrier, Vanitas leaps after them grabbing Noé's hand and they emerge in Altus Paris, the vampire version of Paris.
4	"Night of Mocking Masks"; Transliteration: "Baru Masuke―Kamen ga Warau Yoru―" (Japanese: Bal masqué―仮面が嗤う夜―)	Noriyuki Nomata	Deko Akao	Tomoyuki Itamura	July 24, 2021
Upon reaching Altus Paris, Dominique releases the chain from Noé's neck and invites him to drink her blood. Vanitas appears at the masquerade ball, proclaiming his blue vampire inheritance and offers to cure all vampire curse-bearers. However, he interrupted by the appearance of Dominique's older sister, Veronica, who attempts to kill him. However, he is spirited away by Jeanne. Suddenly, an eerie sound envelops the building activating a number of curse-bearers who begin attacking the other vampires, including two fiends who are the embodiment of Charaltan. Meanwhile, Jeanne is also affected by the desire for blood and Vanitas offers her his own. Driven by thirst, she overcomes her revulsion of his human heritage, and bites into his neck.
5	"Friends"; Transliteration: "Reminisensu－Tomo－" (Japanese: Réminiscence－友－)	Nao Miyoshi	Deko Akao	Tetsuo Hirakawa; Tomoyuki Itamura	July 31, 2021
Noé attacks Charlatan, who realizes that Noé is known to him. In a flashback, Noé recalls when he went to live with Teacher at the de Sade residence where he met Louis and Dominique. As the years passed, Louis realized that he was a curse-bearer, and he carved wooden stakes for Noé to kill him, but Noé could not do it. Later, when their friend Mina was identified as a curse-bearer and sentenced to be executed, Louis killed her when she transformed into a vampiric monster. However, he also killed their other friends while consumed by bloodlust. Noé tried to return him to normal, but Louis bit him and began to suck his blood. Noé was only saved when Teacher arrived and beheaded Louis. Back in the present, Charalatan's black vaporous envoy offers to take Noé to meet Louis, but Vanitas appears and forces him to withdraw.
6	"Questions"; Transliteration: "Sarubeisho―Gimon―" (Japanese: Salvatio―疑問―)	Yoshifumi Sasahara	Takayo Ikami	Tomoyuki Itamura	August 7, 2021
Naenia, Charalatan's envoy, demands to know Noé's true name, but Vanitas and Jeanne come to his defense. Naenia and the two fiends depart while the hall fills with curse-bearers created by the sound of the malnomen dissonance of the Beastly Orchestra. Dominique vows to assist Vanitas in his quest to save the curse-bearers, but when he and Noé depart, she is confronted by Veronica. In another area, Vanitas and Noé come across a young vampire named Catherine, who has transformed into monstrous curse-bearer and is sucking the life from her sisters. Vanitas offers her salvation, which turns her into dust. Suddenly, Veronica appears, and proceeds to attack Noé and Vanitas, suspecting that they are responsible for creating the curse-bearers. However, before she can freeze them to death, she is stopped by August Ruthven, who soon comprehends the situation and takes Noé and Vanitas under his protection. That night, Noé recalls Teacher's instructions are to understand the power of The Book of Vanitas, so although he does not agree with Vanitas' methods, he decides to continue on with the owner of the book in his quest.
7	"Love"; Transliteration: "Famu Fatāru―Koi―" (Japanese: Femme fatale―恋―)	Seung-hui Son	Deko Akao	Haruka Kamohara; Tomoyuki Itamura	August 14, 2021
In the home of Lord Ruthven, Noé and Vanitas share a tarte Tatin with their friends, Dominique, Luca and Jeanne. Luca is still angry about the kiss Vanitas shared with Jeanne, but Vanitas jokingly states that he is in love with Jeanne. He shows the telltale flower-shaped mark left by her bite on his neck, causing Luca even more angst. Jeanne suddenly grabs Vanitas and leaps out the window with him to confront his statement of love. However, Vanitas asks if she is a curse-bearer because of her bloodlust, and she admits that she uses medication to keep her urges under control. He offers to keep her secret under two conditions: she can only sucks his blood and she must calls him by his name and not just "human" because of the special bond they now share. Coincidentally, as Noé and Dominique see them return, Dominique tenderly bites his neck and Noé sucks blood from her hand, creating a bond between them. Later, Noé questions Vanitas about love, but Vanitas replies that he does not really know what it is.
8	"Where Death Slumbers"; Transliteration: "Katakonbe―Shi ga Nemuru Basho―" (Japanese: Catacombes―死が眠る場所―)	Daisuke Chiba; Nao Miyoshi	Takayo Ikami	Tomomi Mochizuki	August 21, 2021
In his home at Castle Carbunculus, Lord Ruthven reveals to Noé and Vanitas that he believes that Charlatan was making an attempt to kill Lucius, the future Grand Duke of Oriflamme. Vanitas requests an audience with the queen whom he believes may be dead or no longer exist as she has not been seen for some time. Ruthven explodes in a rage and bans Vanitas from his castle and casts Noé and Vanitas back into the human world, confirming Vanitas' suspicions. Dante tells Vanitas that a Chasseur, one of the Church's anti-vampire unit, abducted a curse-bearer which had slipped into Paris and took it into their headquarters in the catacombs. That night, Noé and Vanitas steal the uniforms of two guards and enter the catacombs through floor of Notre Dame searching for the Chasseurs. They encounter Roland Fortis, who sees through their disguise and traps Vanitas in a cell and then blinds Noé with a flash grenade. Fortis injects himself with a green serum to enhance his abilities and prepares to kill the vampire, Noé.
9	"Those Who Hunt Crimson"; Transliteration: "Shasūru―Kurenai o Karu Mono―" (Japanese: Chasseur―紅を狩る者―)	Nao Miyoshi	Takayo Ikami	Tensai Okamura	August 28, 2021
When Fortis discovers Noé's companion is Vanitas, he eagerly embraces him but Vanitas resists because of the religious fervor of the Chasseurs. Fortis then attacks Noé with his enhanced abilities, but while they fight, Vanitas manages to release the door to his cell and wounds Fortis so that he and Noé can escape. Noé and Vanitas realize that they must collaborate to defeat Fortis and the Chasseurs, but argue about the appropriate strategy to reach their goal and escape Fortis. Vanitas reveals that he is searching for Moreau who experimented on him after he was taken in by the Chasseurs as an orphaned boy. Noé pretends to take Vanitas hostage and delays Fortis long enough to defeat him and explain their purpose. Fortis then reveals that Moreau has been cast out and he offers to join forces with Noé when he learns that Moreau is alive and probably continuing his vampire experiments. Vanitas leads the group through secret passageways to Moreau's former laboratory and when they open the doors, Moreau welcomes back number "69".
10	"Number 69"; Transliteration: "Shikatorisu－Nanbā Rokujūkyū－" (Japanese: Cicatrice－No.69－)	Noriyuki Nomata	Deko Akao	Yoshiyuki Asai	September 4, 2021
Vanitas flatters Moreau and declares that he has brought in the Chasseurs to protect him. Deceive by Vanitas' ruse, Moreau entertains them. However, when Vanitas asks about his benefactor, Moreau refuses to answer. Noé loses his temper and attacks Moreau, but Moreau is rescued by a multi-eyed being whom he calls Spider, leaving Noé, Vanitas, and the Chasseurs to face the malnomen Prédateur, a black smoke-like monster which devours all life in its path. In desperation, Noé convinces Vanitas to leap with him into its gaping maw. They reach the curse-bearer who is manifesting Prédateur and Vanitas cures it. While they all recover, a series of explosions begin to destroy Moreau's complex so Noé and Vanitas exit the catacombs while Roland explains the disturbance to Olivier. Meanwhile, Spider reports Noé's disruption of Moreau's experiments to Ruthven.
11	"Promises"; Transliteration: "Serumento－Seiyaku－" (Japanese: Serment－誓約－)	Keisuke Ōnishi	Deko Akao	Tensai Okamura	September 11, 2021
Jeanne invites Vanitas on a date in an effort to reduce his interest in her. Despite this, her ploy backfires as she enjoys seeing the sights of Paris with him while they are watched by Dante and Dominique. Meanwhile, Ruthven takes Noé to a café to question him about the enigma that is Vanitas and the fact that he may take advantage of Noé's innocence. Noé explains to Ruthven that he treats vampires and humans alike as they are both flawed, and that he is not aligned with vampires. Enraged by his response, Ruthven attacks Noé and bites his neck. While Jeanne and Vanitas sit in a park, a boy scrapes his knee and it provokes Jeanne's bloodlust. Jeanne leaps to attack the boy to drink his blood. However, she is stopped by Vanitas. Dante then creates a smokescreen so they can escape. Later, when Vanitas allows Jeanne to drink his blood, he again asks her if she is a curse-bearer, but she is unable to answer. Vanitas promises her that if she is, he will personally kill her.
12	"Point of Departure"; Transliteration: "Dūz Ōnburu―Shuppatsuten―" (Japanese: Deux Ombres―出発点―)	Yoshifumi Sasahara	Deko Akao	Tomoyuki Itamura	September 18, 2021
Vanitas and Jeanne chat while returning to the park to retrieve the hat and parasol Doninique lent her, and Vanitas realizes that Ruthven is after Noé. Meanwhile, having bitten Noé, Ruthven forces Noé to swear that he will obey a future command whatever it may be. Vanitas returns home to find an exhausted Noé when Dante arrives and tells them that the Beast of Gévaudan has resurfaced. Vanitas is intrigued by the news, but Noé is consumed by the smell of Vanitas' blood. Vanitas warns Noé that he will kill him if he tries to drink his blood because Noé will then have access to his memories. Later, Vanitas decides to travel to Gévaudan to investigate sightings of the beast, and he takes Noé with him.
Part 2
Special	"Special Program ～The Path Traveled Since the Meeting～"; Transliteration: "Supesharu Tokuban ～Ru Shuman Parukuru Dupyui Ra Rankōntoru～" (Japanese: スペシャル特番 ～Le chemin parcouru depuis la rencontre～)	N/A	N/A	N/A	December 31, 2021 (Note: This episode aired as an hour long special at 8:00 p.m. JST, four hours before the original air time.)
A recap of the first half of the series.
12.5	"Recap"; Transliteration: "Ni Kūru-me Hōsō Chokuzen Tokuban ～An Rūto Puru Ru Jevōdan～" (Japanese: 2クール目放送直前特番 ～En route pour le Gévaudan～)	N/A	N/A	N/A	January 8, 2022
A recap episode that summarizes the first half of the series and provides a sneak peek of the second half.
13	"A Chance Encounter"; Transliteration: "Fore Darujan―Kaikō―" (Japanese: Forêt d'argent―邂逅―)	Nao Miyoshi	Deko Akao	Kōtarō Tamura; Tomoyuki Itamura	January 15, 2022
Dante and Johann take Vanitas and Noé to the distant village of Suagues in pursuit of the Beast of Gévaudan. They venture into the Silver Forest, but Noé become separated from the others. It starts snowing and Vaintas, Dante, and Johann come across a squad of dragoons, indicating that they may have traveled back in time. Suddenly, they are confronted by the Beast. However, Jeanne appears and stops it. Meanwhile, Noé encounters Astolfo Granatum, a young Chasseur who has identified him as a vampire. Astolfo slaughters the surviving dragoons, then injects himself with a serum to enhance his abilities. They are suddenly interrupted by the arrival of Jeanne fighting the Beast along with Vanitas. Vanitas intercedes and goads Astolfo by purposely insulting him, which causes the appearance of Charalatan's envoy Naenia and the parade of demons. Astolfo loses his mind and Vanitas opens The Book of Vanitas to restore the Beast, but it is struck from his hands by a knife and all goes black. Later, Noé lies unconscious and Chloé has returned to her human form. Jean-Jacques appears and pick up the grimoire, inviting her to return to the Gévaudan castle with him.
14	"The Witch and the Young Man"; Transliteration: "Shatō du Sorusiēru―Majo to Seinen―" (Japanese: Château de sorciére―魔女と青年―)	Noriyuki Nomata	Deko Akao	Masayuki Sakoi	January 22, 2022
Jeanne finds Vanitas in the snow, wounded by the poisoned knife of Astolfo. She takes him to an abandoned building where she tries to restore his health, but he realizes that while she is there to slay the Beast, he is trying to save it. The next morning, Vanitas has recovered, but Jeanne is dismayed and embarrassed when she realizes she lay next to his naked body all night to keep him warm. Johann and Dante locate them and reveal that Jean-Jacques and Chloé have taken Noé and the grimoire. However, Vanitas is suspicious of their motives and demands to know why he, the vampires and the Church are after the Beast, and Dante agrees to tell him. Meanwhile, Marco finds Alfonso sheltering in a cave still intent on killing the Beast. At Castle Gévaudan, Chloé sucks blood from the unconscious Noé until the jealous Jean-Jacques intervenes and stops her. Later, Noé comes down for dinner and finds Chloé in the company of Charalatan's envoy Naenia.
15	"The d'Apchiers' Vampire"; Transliteration: "Wazo e Sieru―Dapushe no Kyūketsuki―" (Japanese: Oiseau et ciel―ダプシェの吸血鬼―)	Ken'ichi Nishida	Deko Akao	Tomomi Mochizuki	January 29, 2022
Chloé tells Noé that she became a curse-bearer voluntarily when Naenia granted her wish. Noé attacks Naenia in revenge for Louis's demise, but Chloé intercedes and knocks him unconscious. Meanwhile, Dante tells Veritas that the d'Apchiers were wiped out by the Beast. They were conducting research on the World Formula against the Church's wishes seeking to produce an Alternate Engine for altering the formula which gave rise to the Beast of Gévaudan. He reveals that he is working for Sir Francis Varney, the Clockwork Fiend Marquis Machina, who seeks the Alternate Engine. Back in the castle, Chloé recalls the history of her family and their effort to create an Alternate Engine and her continued research. Years later, after the war between humans and vampires, August Ruthven demanded the results of her research but she refused to give it to him. Chloé now decides it is time to activate the Alternate Engine.
16	"The Beast"; Transliteration: "Shasu o Vanpīru―"Kemono"―" (Japanese: Chasse aux vampires―"獣"―)	Nao Miyoshi	Deko Akao	Tensai Okamura	February 5, 2022
Jeanne heads off to Gévaudan castle to kill the Beast with Vanitas in tow. Meanwhile inside the castle, Jean-Jacques shares his blood with Noé so the vampire will share his memories. Noé then sees how Jean-Jacques made a pact with Charlatan to gain the power to protect Chloé. He is in fact the Beast, not Chloé, although she is a vampire who willingly became a curse-bearer. Vanitas reunites with Noé, who has recovered, and they share the information they have gleaned to date. They suspect that the Beast was sanctioned by the Church as a way of keeping the population fearful of vampires and the unknown. They soon encounter Astolfo, and Noé offers to take care of him while Vanitas seeks out Chloé and the grimoire. Vanitas finds Chloé as she begins activating the Alternate Engine, which surprisingly forces Naenia to take a bodily form, enabling Chloé to dispose of her and the evil she represents.
17	"Hands upon a Nightmare"; Transliteration: "Vanjansu―Akumu ni Fureru Te―" (Japanese: Vengeance―悪夢に触れる手―)	Takahiro Tamano	Takayo Ikami	Kōtarō Tamura	February 12, 2022
Chloé begins to choke Naenia in an attempt to kill her in revenge for turning Jean-Jacques into the Beast, but Vanitas warns her that Naenia will recall who she is, the malnomen of Queen Faustina, the first vampire of the Crimson Moon. Naenia resists Chloé and the Beast attacks her, but the queen easily throws it aside and Chloé collapses in pain. The castle is then enveloped in blackness and torn asunder, and its pieces begin to float apart in a closed world that Chloé created. The populace is attacked by wolves but the paladin Roland and his Chasseurs, Olivier, Georges and Maria arrive and slay the wolves. Roland reunites Vanitas and Noé and explains that he wants to speak with Chloé before he kills the Beast. Meanwhile, Jeanne has a flashback to when Ruthven turned her into a bourreau so she could become a weapon for his purposes.
18	"Just the Two of Us"; Transliteration: "Avekku Towa―Futaribotchi―" (Japanese: Avec toi―ふたりぼっち―)	Shintarō Itoga	Takayo Ikami	Takayuki Tanaka	February 19, 2022
Jeanne is conflicted over her concern for the vampires Chloé and Jean-Jacques and her duty as a bourreau to kill them, but Vanitas pleads with her to help him save them. As Astolfo recovers consciousness, he recalls how he and his sister befriended a vampire boy who then killed his entire family and household in revenge for his own family being killed by the Chasseurs' paladins. Vanitas asks Dante to search for the grimoire while he tries to reactivate the Alternate Engine which is powered by a special form of astermite called blue tearstone. In a wild rampage, Astolfo attacks and slashes Jean-Jacques and then viciously attacks Noé. Both Vanitas and the wounded Jean-Jacques realize that Chloé meant to destroy herself and Gévaudan castle. Jean-Jacques reaches out to Chloé, declaring his desire for the two of them to be together forever and causing her to resume her human form. Meanwhile, Vanitas recovers the grimoire and opens it in an attempt to neutralize Chloé's self-destructive spell enveloping the castle.
19	"Snow Flower"; Transliteration: "Kanorusu―Yuki no Hana―" (Japanese: Canorus―雪の花―)	Noriyuki Nomata	Deko Akao	Tomomi Mochizuki	February 26, 2022
Vanitas discovers that the grimoire is powerless against the malnomen unless a curse-bearer renounces the nether world of ice and snow which they inhabit, and he pleads with Chloé to reject it. Meanwhile, Noé defeats Astolfo but loses his left hand in the process. Vanitas successfully convinces Chloé to return to humanity, revealing her true name, Canorus, "she who makes music with snow flowers". Her spell is broken and the land becomes covered in white petals. With Chloé now human, Jean-Jacques asks Vanitas to do the same for him so they can be together, and he does, revealing his name to be Aprix, "he who nestles up to the last snow". Thus, Gévaudan is finally free of the Beast's curse. Jeanne is so overjoyed that Chloé is human again and she no longer has to kill her childhood friend, that she is overcome with emotion and jumps on Vanitas and drinks his blood.
20	"The Incurable Disease"; Transliteration: "Maru Damūru―Fuji no Yamai―" (Japanese: Mal d'amour―不治の病―)	Hiromichi Matano	Deko Akao	Tensai Okamura	March 5, 2022
Noé returns to Paris with Vanitas, who seems to be suffering from a debilitating ailment since Jeanne bit him, and he cannot get her out of his mind. Later, Vanitas encounters Roland and Olivier in the street and after he describes his condition, they proclaim that he is in love, much to his astonishment and horror. Meanwhile, Jeanne confides in Luca how she feels about Vanitas and he explains to her surprise that she has fallen for him.
21	"Scars"; Transliteration: "An Ōtoru―Shōkon―" (Japanese: Un autre―傷痕―)	Nao Miyoshi	Deko Akao	Tensai Okamura	March 12, 2022
Dominique is taken hostage by Vanitas' adoptive brother, Mikhail, who sends a letter to Noé with a lock of her hair. Noé meets Mikhail in an amusement park and after threatening to harm Dominique who is standing atop the ferris wheel, he forces Noé to drink his blood to reveal his memories. Noé then sees how he was taken in by the Chasseurs after his prostitute mother was killed by a vampire, but he was then taken by Doctor Moreau as a test subject, which is where he first met Vanitas.
22	"Blue Night"; Transliteration: "Rankōntoru―Ao no Yoru―" (Japanese: Rencontre―蒼の夜―)	Ken'ichi Nishida	Deko Akao	Tomomi Mochizuki	March 19, 2022
Moreau's experiments on the children involved injecting them with minute amounts of Blue Moon vampire blood so they would acquire vampire characteristics. On the day he attempted to link them to two Books of Vanitas in an effort to access the analytical engines contained within the "books", the androgynous appearing Blue Moon vampire attacked and destroyed the facility and took the children. The vampire cared for them but their lifespan had been shortened due to the effects of Moreau's experiments. Later, the vampire offered a solution to extend their lives by making them members of the Blue Moon clan. Back in the present, Noé collapses after drinking Mikhail's blood.
23	"Tears like Rain"; Transliteration: "Puruvowāru―Sora Shiranu Ame―" (Japanese: Pleuvoir―空知らぬ雨―)	Noriyuki Nomata	Deko Akao	Motonobu Hori; Tomoyuki Itamura	March 26, 2022
Vanitas challenges Mikhail to recall the events when Vanitas killed Luna, Vampire of the Blue Moon. Mikhail confesses that he remembers little of that time, except that when he was saved from death, his savior said there was a way to being Father back to life. Vanitas tries to shoot Mikhail with Dante's gun but Noé intercedes, fearing for Dominique's life and demands to know about Vanitas' past. Vanitas refuses and they engage in a titanic battle with Vanitas using the green serum to enhance his abilities and employing all the power of the grimoire against Noé in a struggle to protect his memories. They fight to a standstill, both badly wounded, so Dominique steps off the top of the ferris wheel so that Noé no longer has to worry about her. However, she is saved by Jeanne. Noé realizes that Vanitas refuses to allow himself to become attached to anyone. Noé still sees Vanitas as a friend and he leaves himself defenseless as Vanitas comes at him with a knife.
24	"His Wish"; Transliteration: "Apure Ra Puryui―Kare no Negai―" (Japanese: Après la pluie―彼の願い―)	Nao Miyoshi	Deko Akao	Tensai Okamura	April 2, 2022
Vanitas has the defenseless Noé at his mercy, but he cannot bring himself to plunge in the knife. Mikhail angrily unleashes the full power of his grimoire and calls on vampires to destroy everyone, but he cannot control its power. Dominique protects everyone with her control over ice, but when Mikhail lashes out at Vanitas, the grimoire hurts him. Teacher then appears in the form of a young man, admitting that he was the one who saved Mikhail. He now goes by the name of Count of St Germain and leaves with Mikhail. The next day, Mikhail returns to find Vanitas and Noé on the rooftop. Vanitas explains that he killed Luna because the Blue Moon Vampire had been cursed by an unknown person. Searching for the culprit is the reason Vanitas treats cursed vampires and he refuses to join Mikhail. Once Mikhail leaves, Vanitas reflects on his past actions, and although he vows to continue his quest, he apologizes to Noé, whom he now regards as a friend.

== Home media release ==
=== Region 1 ===
Crunchyroll (Region 1 – USA)
Title	Episodes	Date	Ref.
The Case Study of Vanitas Season One, Part 1	1–12	December 5, 2022	
The Case Study of Vanitas Season One, Part 2	13–24	January 30, 2024	

=== Region 2 ===
Aniplex+ (Region 2 – Japan)
Vol.	Episodes	Cover art	Release date	Ref.
1	1–3	Vanitas & Noé Archiviste	October 27, 2021	
2	4–6	Jeanne & Lucius Oriflamme	November 24, 2021	
3	7–9	Dominique & Louis de Sade	December 22, 2021	
4	10–12	Roland Fortis & Olivier	January 26, 2022	
5	13–15	Chloé d'Apchier & Jean-Jacques Chastel	March 30, 2022	
6	16–18	Astolfo Granatum & Noé Archiviste	April 27, 2022	
7	19–21	Mikhail & Vanitas	May 25, 2022	
8	22–24	Murr, Noé Archiviste & Vanitas	June 29, 2022	

== Reception ==
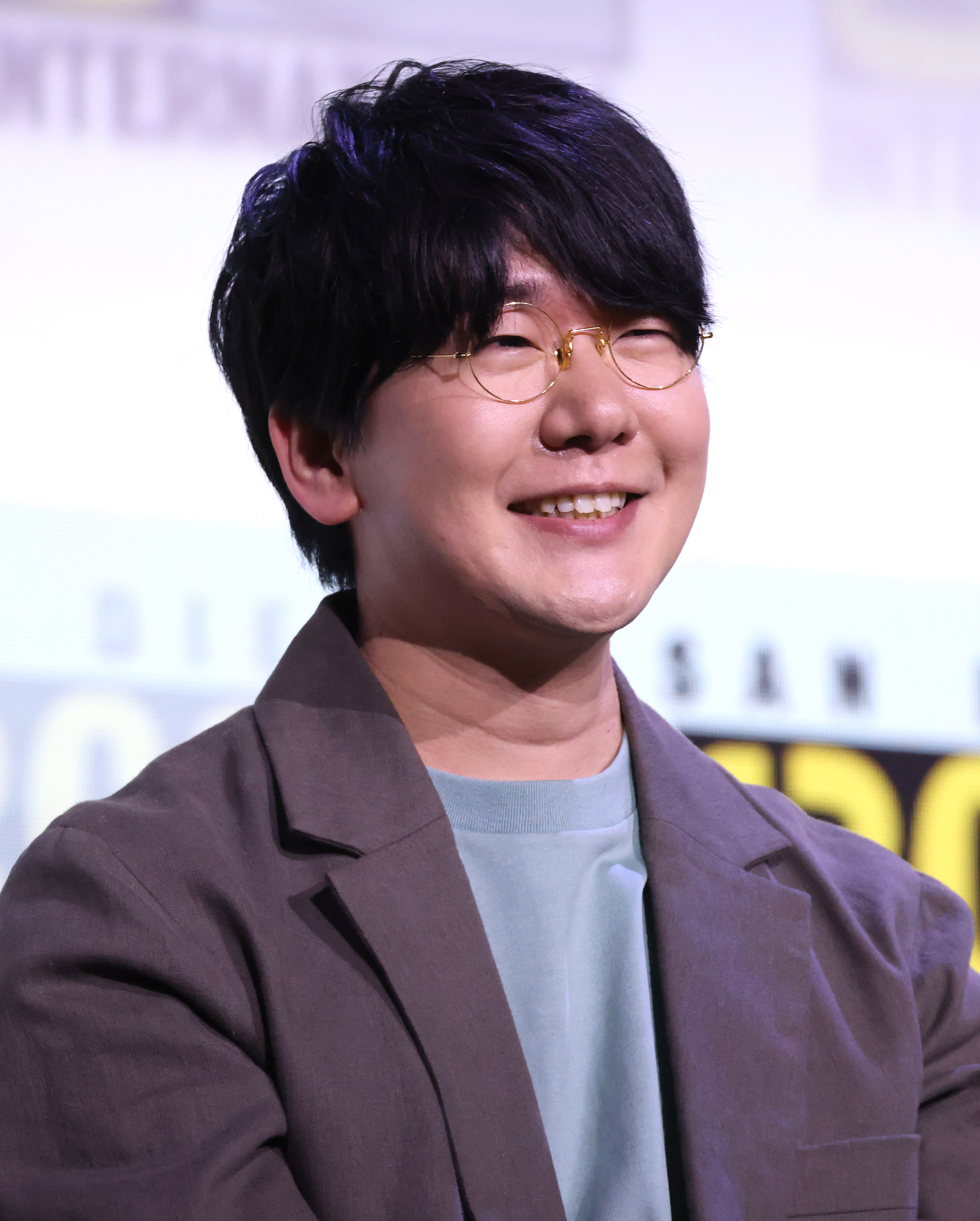
Natsuki Hanae received praise for his performance as Vanitas

The series was listed twice by Anime News Network as one of the best anime of 2021, and IGN also included it in its own list.

Regarding the characters, Bleeding Cool described Vanitas's personality as one of the most entertaining aspects of the series, noting that his constant smirking and laughing appeared to be a façade concealing something from his past; the reviewer compared him to Fullmetal Alchemist protagonist Edward Elric and also enjoyed his relationship with Noé. Anime News Network stated that the revelation of Vanitas's connection to Doctor Moreau made the character more vulnerable than expected; upon meeting his torturer again, Vanitas's personality changed drastically, giving him survivor's guilt and making him rely far more on Noé. The Fandom Post noted that Vanitas and Jeanne's comical date was more enjoyable than the main plot, which was later foreshadowed. The series's second half also received a positive reception from Anime News Network writers, who praised the character arcs of the main cast and the production value, considering it one of the best anime of the Winter 2022 season. Bleeding Cool noted that while Noé appeared to command more respect from the cast, Vanitas preferred the idea of being a loner hated by society. The same publication found the season's climax, which depicted Vanitas's true past, tragic and powerful because it affected the relationship between the two protagonists, who initially fought until Vanitas found himself unable to kill Noé. Several reviewers focused on Vanitas's relationship with the vampire Jeanne; his forcing a kiss on her was criticized as inappropriate for comedy.

Several critics said Jeanne sucking Vanitas's blood displayed a major sex appeal based on vampirism stories which stood out.

Caitlin Moore of Anime News Network listed the handling of vampirism between Jeanne and Vanitas, as well as between Dominique and Noé, as the best moment in anime of that year due to the amount of sex appeal they portrayed directly. The Fandom Post agreed regarding the sex appeal featured in the episode in which Jeanne sucked Vanitas's blood, comparing it directly to sex and suggesting it as an example of how their relationship could progress in later episodes.

In terms of production values, The Fandom Post found the series's early fight scenes among its most appealing elements because of Vanitas's unpredictability, especially in his dealings with Jeanne, though the series was less eventful in other areas, and the handling of its science fiction elements drew criticism. The second opening theme, "Your Name", was also praised by Real Sound for the depth of its lyrics. The extensive violence in the series's fifth episode led Funimation to warn sensitive viewers against watching it. Bones' animation was generally praised for making the settings and character details appealing, alongside Yuki Kajiura's music. Natsuki Hanae's performance as Vanitas drew major praise from Anime Feminist for how he conveyed different sides of Vanitas's twisted personality, to the point that the character came across as "peak trash".

In 2022, the series was nominated for the 6th Crunchyroll Anime Awards in the category of "Best Fantasy". The characters of Vanitas, Noé, and Jeanne were popular on Anime Trending, with Vanitas and Jeanne nominated in the couple category in 2022. The series was also nominated for the 7th Crunchyroll Anime Awards in the "Best Fantasy" category in 2023.
