= List of The Case Study of Vanitas chapters =

The Case Study of Vanitas is a manga written and illustrated by Jun Mochizuki. Set in 19th century Paris and containing steampunk thematics, the story focuses on the young Vanitas, who uses the grimoire called The Book of Vanitas to heal cursed vampires. The vampire Noé Archiviste joins Vanitas in his quest to save cursed vampires.The series began in Square Enix's Monthly Gangan Joker on December 22, 2015. In April 2020, Mochizuki announced that the manga would be on hiatus due to the COVID-19 pandemic. The manga resumed publication in November 2020. Square Enix has collected its chapters into individual tankōbon volumes. The first volume was released on April 22, 2016. As of April 22, 2024, eleven volumes have been released.

On December 3, 2015, Yen Press announced on its official Twitter account that it would be publishing new chapters of the series concurrently with Japan. The manga is also licensed in Taiwan by Sharp Point Press, in Hong Kong by Sparkle Roll, in South Korea by Daewon C.I., in France by Ki-oon, in Germany by Carlsen Manga, in Italy by Star Comics, in Spain by Norma Editorial, in Russia by Istari Comics, in Thailand by Siam Inter Comics, in Vietnam by Kim Đồng Publishing House, in Ukraine by Nasha Idea and in Poland by Waneko.

== Volume list ==
No.	Original release date	Original ISBN	English release date	English ISBN
1	April 22, 2016	978-4-7575-4961-6	December 20, 2016	978-0-316-55281-3
1. "Vanitas: In the Event of Rusty Hopes"; 2. "Noé: In the City of Flowers"; 3. "Jeanne: The Hellfire Witch"; 4. "Femme Fatale: Love"
In an airship travelling to Paris, the vampire Noé Archiviste meets a cursed one, Amelia Ruth. Using the grimoire called The Book of Vanitas, a human who succeeded the Blue Moon vampire, Vanitas, manages to restore Amelia's health. However, Count Parks Orlok claims that Amelia will be executed and an ally of Vanitas, Dante, passes the group information how they can prove Amelia's innocence by showcasing the existence of cursed vampires. While at first the mission proves easy, Vanitas and Noé by Jeanne, the Hellfire Witch who is being commanded by her master Luca to take the book. Having Noé take Luca as a hostage, Vanitas is able to defeat Jeanne but suddenly kisses her and confesses his unconditional love to her. Luca and Jeanne escape and Vanitas decides to keep searching for more cursed vampires.
2	October 22, 2016	978-4-7575-5105-3	May 23, 2017	978-0-316-47168-8
5. "Archiviste: Fangs That Reveal Blood"; 6. "Altus: Other World"; 7. "Bal Masqué: Night of Sneering Masks"; 8. "Louis: Sinking in a Pool of Blood"; 9. "Reminiscence: Friends"; 10. "Salvatio: Uncertainty"
With Amelia's innocence proven, Vanitas keeps seeking Noé's aid. Lady Dominique de Sade takes Noe, his childhood friend, to Atlus Paris, an alternate version of Paris where vampires live. Vanitas follows them to a masquerade ball where he claims to all vampires his identity and motivation to cure all curse bearers. However, he interrupted by the appearance of Dominique's older sister, Veronica, who attempts to kill him. Jeanne takes Vanitas who wonders if she has a curse and convinces her to drink his blood. Meanwhile, Noé is attacked by a shadowy figure named Charlatan that tries to curse him, which makes him remind how when he was a child, one of his friends and Dominique's twin, Louis, was killed after his curse. Vanitas saves Noe and other vampires with Jeanne, Dominique and Noe but fails to save one.
3	April 22, 2017	978-4-7575-5329-3	November 14, 2017	978-0-316-41284-1
11. "Deux Ombres: Point of Departure"; 12. "Pause"; 13. "Glissand: Glissando"; 14. "Catacombes: Where the Dead Sleep"; 15. "Chasseurs: Those Who Hunt Crimson"
Luca invites Vanitas, Noé, and Dominique for a meal in apologies for attempting to take the book but is angry at Vanitas for kissing Jeanne. Vanitas initially jokes about already having a relationship with her using the mark she left her in Atlus Paris as proof but changes his mind. He decides to keep it a secret in exchange of Jeanne only consuming his blood. In the aftermath, Vanitas asks Lord Ruthven to see the Queen, suspecting her but he and Noe are kicked out. That night, Noé and Vanitas enter the catacombs through floor of Notre Dame searching for the Chasseurs. After a brief encounter with the Chasseurs Roland Fortis, Vanitas confesses he was taken that when he was a child, he was kidnapped by Dr. Moreau and became a test subject until he was saved by the original Vanitas.
4	November 22, 2017	978-4-7575-5505-1	August 21, 2018	978-1-9753-8106-6
16. "Galop: At the End of the Riot"; 17. "Cicatrice: No. 69"; 18. "Dos à Dos: The Shape of Salvation"; 19. "Serment: Spellbound"; 20. "Serment: Promise (Part I)"; 21. "Serment: Promise (Part II)"
Noé becomes angry due to Vanitas' tactics and takes down Roland using Vanitas as a hostage. Noe and Roland befriend much to Vanitas' horror, who takes them to find Moreau. In his laboratory, Vanitas tries to keep a friendly attitude towards the man who experimented him but Noe stops them, tired with how Moreau treats people as objects. Vanitas fails to interrogate Moreau when he reminds him of another test subject who called him brother and the doctor escapes. After defeating a cursed bearer in the area, Vanitas, Noe and Roland escape from the area. The following day, Jeanne invites Vanitas to date following how Dominique learned that Vanitas only wanted toy with her rather that following a relationship. However, Vanitas realizes the nature of the date and decides to charm her.
5	July 21, 2018	978-4-7575-5758-1	January 22, 2019	978-1-9753-8368-8
22. "Hurler: A Calling Voice"; 23. "Au Pas Camarade: Pace"; 24. "Forêt d'argent: Chance Encounter"; 25. "Endroit Approprié: Melee"; 26. "Dissonance: Creaking Laughter"; 27. "Cage de Neige: Dregs" 27.5. "Chambre D'Enfants: A Dream of the Sound of Rain"
The date continues where Vanitas keeps charming Jeanne who is starting to falling for her until she sees a wounded child and Vanitas escapes with her to feed her with his blood. In the aftermath, Vanitas deduces that Jeanne's master, Ruthven took Noe but Noe shows no sign of being attacked. The two are visited by Dante who claims that a cursed beast was found in Gévaudan. Vanitas, Noé, and several soldiers go to the area to take the beast whom Jeanne calls Chloé d'Apchier, an ageless vampire. In the meantime, the chasseur paladin Astolfo Granatum starts killing soldiers and wounds Vanitas. The beast disappears and takes tired Vanitas to a house to nurse each other together with Vanitas questioning if the beast was really Chloé. The vampire Chloé takes Noe and Vanitas' book alongside his friend Jean-Jacques Chastel.
6	February 22, 2019	978-4-7575-5996-7	December 24, 2019	978-1-9753-0612-0
28. "Dal Segno: Question Mark"; 29. "Château de Sorèiré: The Witch and the Youth"; 30. "Strascinando: Tremolo"; 31. "Oiseau et Ciel: The Vampire of the d'Apchiers"; 32. "Visiteur: Footfalls of the Beast"; 33. "Cauchemar: Rumble"; 34. "Jean-Jacques: The Vampire of the Chastels"
Noé sees that although Chloé is surrounded by Charalatan's envoy Naenia, the vampire is instead calm. Dante tells Vanitas that the d'Apchiers were wiped out by the Beast. They were conducting research on the World Formula against the Church's wishes seeking to produce an Alternate Engine for altering the formula which gave rise to the Beast of Gévaudan. Back in the castle, Chloé recalls the history of her family and their effort to create an Alternate Engine and her continued research. Jean-Jacques forces Noé to see his memories by having him drink his blood while Vanitas realizes that Chloé's area is not real but instead an alternate world where the same event is repeated including the Beast.
7	October 21, 2019	978-4-7575-6269-1	July 21, 2020	978-1-9753-1380-7
35. "Louisette: Pillar of Justice"; 36. "Chasse aux Vampires: The Beast"; 37. "Vengeance: Hands That Touch a Nightmare"; 38. "Naenia: She Who Harbors Death"; 39. "Poupée Fissurée: The Essence of the Witch"; 40. "Avec Toi: Alone Together"
Jean-Jacques is revealed as Chloé's friend who has taken him for years after her father passed away. reunites with Noé in the castle and tells him to use his full strength on the Asfolto, who is still attacking them. Vanitas goes to the castle where he convinces Jeanne to decide that her wish is not killing the Cursed Beast Chloé but instead save her life as she was also her friend. Having realized that Chloé was planning to kill herself rather through her technology, Jean-Jacques joins Vanitas' cause. Dante manages to find the book and gives it to his owner while facing the berserker Chloé.
8	June 22, 2020	978-4-7575-6635-4	June 15, 2021	978-1-9753-2453-7
41. "Canorus: Snow Flower"; 42. "Encore une Fois: Love"; 43. "Encens Restant: Lingering Scent of the Dream"; 44. "Mal d'Amour: The Incurable Illness (Part 1)"; 45. "Mal d'Amour: The Incurable Illness (Part 2)"; 46. "Un Autre: Scar"
Through his book, Vanitas manages to restore the original town and restore Chloé's humanity. Noé manages to defeat Asfolto who is taken by his superior Roland who takes responsibility in regards to his behaviour. Chloé and Jean-Jacques comfort each other now that they are together safe. Jeanne thanks Vanitas for saving her through a kiss which causes him to fall in love with her. Back in Paris, Vanitas seeks aid in regards to how to stop such strong feelings towards Jeanne, claiming that he is a despicable person. Meanwhile, Jeanne realizes that she has fallen for Vanitas too but is happy she learned this feeling. Dominique is then hypnotized by Vanitas' adoptive brother, Mikhail, who is also using an identical book. Noé then goes to her rescue Dominique and finds Mikhail.
9	June 22, 2021	978-4-7575-7231-7	May 23, 2023	978-1-9753-6921-7
47. "Hétérogène: Sneering Laughter"; 48. "Rencontre: Blue Night"; 49. "Douleur: Kind Child"; 50. "Petrichor: The Thread That Reels in the Past"; 51. "Tempest: A Silent Scream" 51.5. "Jours Bruyants: Tales of Lost Children"
With Dominique hostage, Mikhail forces Noe to drink his blood to know his brother's origins and then learn the full story; after his mother was killed by a vampire, Mikhail was captured by Dr. Moreau who used him alongside 69, Vanitas' test subject name, in order carry on his experiments. 69 feared Mikhail's torment and offered himself to be more used which caused Mikhail to take a liking to him, calling him brother. As their bodies weakened, the original Vanitas appeared and took both children with him. During their time together, 69 revealed to his new guardian that his mother died during labour and that his father was killed by a vampire. This led to having a survivor's guilt to the point he did not want to become a vampire with his blood despite having now a limited lifespan. Mikhail still became a vampire and during an unknown day, 69 killed Vanitas and took his name. With Noe having learned the story, he is faced by Vanitas who tries to kill Mikhail. Noé is forced to fight Vanitas to protect Dominique and tries to take his blood too. In order to face Noé, Vanitas uses doping to increase his strength.
10	May 20, 2022	978-4-7575-7826-5; 978-4-7575-7827-2 (SE)	October 17, 2023	978-1-9753-7531-7
52. "Sens Unique: Fall"; 53. "Plevouir: Rain Which Doesn't Know the Sky"; 54. "La nuit sans lune: Dark Night"; 55. "Après la pluie: His Wish"; 56. "Faire un gâteau: Bittersweet"
11	April 22, 2024	978-4-7575-8226-2; 978-4-7575-9135-6 (SE)	April 22, 2025	979-8-8554-1520-9; 979-8-8554-1687-9 (SE)
57. "Au revoir: Again, Someday"; 58. "Observation: The Darkness In Between"; 59. "Fuga: What the Organist Plays"; 60. "Bonne journée: Sweets, Complaints, and Reconciliation"; 60.5. "Couche: On Clothing": 61. "Jeu de paume: Court Tennis"; 62. "Bourdonnement: Wingbeats of Scattered Thought"
