= What's Your Name =

What's Your Name may refer to:

- What's Your Name?, a 1997 album by Adam Sandler
- What's Your Name (album), a 2007 compilation album by Lynyrd Skynyrd
- "What's Your Name" (Don and Juan song), a 1962 top-ten single written by Claude Johnston
- "What's Your Name" (Lynyrd Skynyrd song), 1977
- "What's Your Name" (Usher song), 2008
- "What's Your Name", a 1969 single by The Music Explosion
- "What's Your Name", a 1972 single by Chicory Tip
- "What's Your Name", a 1974 single by The Moments
- "What's Your Name", a 1981 single by DeBarge
- ”What’s Your Name?”, a song on the 1981 Depeche Mode album Speak & Spell
- "What's Your Name", a song on the 1994 Boston album Walk On
- "What's Your Name?", a 2003 single by Morcheeba
- "What's Your Name?", a song on the 2004 Jesse McCartney album Beautiful Soul
- "What's Your Name?", a 2007 single by Cosmo4
- "What's Your Name?", a song on the 2013 4Minute album Name Is 4Minute
- "What's Your Name", a song on the 2015 Dillon Francis EP This Mixtape Is Fire
- "What's Your Name", a song on the 2019 (G)I-dle EP I Made

== See also ==
- "What Is Your Name?" (Twin Peaks), 2017 TV episode
- "Wadsyaname", a 2007 song by Nelly
- "WusYaName", a 2021 song by Tyler, the Creator
- "What's Ur Name", a song on the 2008 Janet Jackson album Discipline
- Your Name (disambiguation)
