= Pandora Hearts =

Japanese manga series

- First tankōbon volume cover, featuring Oz Vessalius
- Genre: Adventure; Dark fantasy; Mystery
- Manga
- Written by: Jun Mochizuki
- Published by: Square Enix
- English publisher: NA: Yen Press
- Magazine: Monthly GFantasy
- English magazine: NA: Yen Plus
- Original run: May 18, 2006 – March 18, 2015
- Volumes: 24
- Anime television series
- Directed by: Takao Kato
- Written by: Mayori Sekijima
- Music by: Yuki Kajiura
- Studio: Xebec
- Licensed by: NA: NIS America
- Original network: TBS, BS-TBS, CBC, MBS
- Original run: April 2, 2009 – September 24, 2009
- Episodes: 25
- Original video animation

Pandora Hearts Omake
- Studio: Xebec
- Licensed by: NA: NIS America
- Released: July 24, 2009 – March 25, 2010
- Runtime: 3 minutes
- Episodes: 9
- icon

Pandora Hearts (stylized as PandoraHearts) is a Japanese manga series written and illustrated by Jun Mochizuki. It was serialized in Square Enix's shōnen manga magazine Monthly GFantasy from May 2006 to March 2015, with its chapters collected in 24 tankōbon volumes. In North America, it was originally licensed for an English release by Broccoli Books but was later dropped. It was relicensed by Yen Press. The story follows Oz Vessalius, the 15-year-old heir to the house of Vessalius. His coming-of-age ceremony is set upon by strangers who condemn him for the sin of being alive and banish him into the depths of Abyss, an otherworldly dimension.

A 25-episode anime television series adaptation by Xebec was broadcast from April to September 2009. A nine-episode extra original video animation (OVA) was released from July 2009 to March 2010. In North America, the anime series was licensed by NIS America.

== Plot ==
Oz Vessalius is the heir to the Vessalius House, one of the Four Great Dukedoms granted considerable authority by the monarchy. He enjoys a life of privilege alongside his younger sister, Ada, and his valet Gilbert, though his upbringing is marked by the absence of his father, Xai, who entrusted him and Ada to their uncle Oscar in their infancy. During his coming-of-age ceremony, Oz encounters Sharon Rainsworth and her enigmatic servant, Xerxes Break. The event takes a dark turn when the long-dormant ceremonial clock suddenly moves, heralding the arrival of the Baskervilles, a mysterious group clad in red cloaks. They declare Oz's existence a sin and forcibly cast him into the Abyss, a nightmarish dimension inhabited by monstrous entities known as Chains, previously thought to exist only in legends.

Within the Abyss, Oz learns he can form contracts with Chains by consuming their blood. He forges a pact with Alice, a Chain infamous as the Bloody Black Rabbit, or B-Rabbit, to secure his escape. Upon returning to the human world, he discovers that a decade has passed. Sharon and Break, members of the clandestine organization Pandora, take him under their protection. Pandora, founded a century earlier in the wake of the Tragedy of Sablier—an event in which the entire city of Sablier was swallowed by the Abyss—dedicates itself to researching Chains and the Abyss. Determined to uncover the truth behind his condemnation, Oz joins their investigation into the Intention of the Abyss, the dimension's ruler. He is aided by Alice and Gilbert, now an adult and a member of the Nightray dukedom, who has formed a contract with their family's Chain, Raven.

Their inquiries lead them to revelations about Alice, Gilbert, and his unsettling younger brother, Vincent, all of whom were connected to the Tragedy of Sablier. They also encounter the spirit of Jack Vessalius, a legendary hero who averted global catastrophe during the Tragedy and founded Pandora. Jack, now residing within Oz's body, discloses that the mastermind behind the disaster was Glen Baskerville, the Baskervilles' leader and his former closest friend. Further investigations reveal that Break once illegally contracted with a Chain and met the Intention of the Abyss, who is Alice's twin sister. Duke Rufus Barma, another key figure, shares records indicating that Jack sealed Glen's soul within his own mutilated body, dividing it into five fragments.

After two of these seals are destroyed, Oz and Duke Barma orchestrate a second coming-of-age ceremony to locate another fragment, only for the event to be disrupted by the noble Isla Yura and his cult, who attempt to recreate the Tragedy of Sablier. Though their scheme is thwarted, the Baskervilles destroy the seal, and Elliot Nightray, Gilbert's adoptive brother, is killed. His valet, Leo, is taken by Vincent, who reveals that Leo now carries Glen's soul and must succeed him as the Baskervilles' leader. Consumed by guilt, Leo embraces this role, vowing to destroy the Intention of the Abyss.

As conflict escalates between Pandora and the Baskervilles, the fourth seal is shattered, exposing Glen's head instead of Jack's remains. Duke Barma deciphers hidden records proving that Jack himself orchestrated the Tragedy of Sablier out of a twisted desire to reunite with Lacie, Glen's sister and the mother of Alice and the Intention of the Abyss. Oz witnesses Jack's memories, learning that he was originally Lacie's beloved black rabbit doll, brought to life by the Core of the Abyss and later transformed into the monstrous B-Rabbit to aid Jack's apocalyptic plans. Meanwhile, Oswald, the original Glen, seizes control of Leo's body and attempts to alter history by preventing Lacie's death.

Oz, accepting his true nature as the B-Rabbit, resolves to stop Oswald without rewriting the past. With the help of his allies, he devises a plan to sever the Intention of the Abyss's connection to the world, though at the cost of Oscar's and Break's lives. Traveling back in time, Oz and Alice confront Oswald and the Core of the Abyss, respectively. Alice's plea causes the Core to spiral into despair, distorting time further and sending them to an era before Oswald and Lacie became Baskervilles. Ultimately, Oswald cannot bring himself to kill Lacie, relinquishing control to Leo. Using Oz's power, they persuade the Core to sever its bond with the Intention of the Abyss, restoring the world.

Oz and Alice fade away peacefully, their sacrifice ensuring the world's safety, while Gilbert vows to await their reincarnation. In the aftermath, Pandora dissolves, the Baskervilles forge a new relationship with the Core, and the survivors move forward. A century later, Vincent reunites the reincarnated Oz and Alice with Gilbert, who, overcome with emotion, welcomes them back, finally finding closure after a lifetime of grief.

== Media ==
=== Manga ===
Written and illustrated by Jun Mochizuki, Pandora Hearts was serialized in Square Enix's shōnen manga magazine Monthly GFantasy from May 18, 2006, to March 18, 2015. Square Enix collected its chapters in 24 tankōbon volumes, released from October 27, 2006, to June 27, 2015.

In North America, the series was first licensed in English by Broccoli Books, but it was later dropped. It was then licensed by Yen Press and serialized in Yen Plus starting with the June 2009 issue. Yen Press released the 24 volumes from December 15, 2009, to March 22, 2016. Square Enix started publishing the series in English on the Manga Up! online platform in July 2022.

=== Anime ===
Studio Xebec produced a 25-episode anime television series adaptation in 2009, it was directed by Takao Kato. The series aired from April 3 to September 25, 2009. The series broadcast on TBS, BS-TBS, CBC and MBS for its initial run. On February 11, 2010, NIS America announced the licensing of the series in North America, and released English-subtitled DVDs of the anime on October 26, 2010.

=== Other books ===
==== Guidebooks ====
Pandora Hearts 8.5: Mine of Mine was released on March 27, 2009. The guide contains a short story revolving around Gilbert Nightray and artwork, and official romanization of the Pandora Hearts cast. Oz Vessalius and Gilbert Nightray are on the guide cover, along with a plush of B-Rabbit. Pandora Hearts 18.5: Evidence is the second official guide book, released on July 27, 2012. Pandora Hearts 24 + 1: Last Dance is the third and final official guide book, released on June 27, 2015. With the release of the anime adaptation of the series, an official art book relating to the anime has been released with the title of Official Animation Guide. Contents included interviews with the author, rough drafts, and more behind the scenes.

==== Artbooks ====
Pandora Hearts Odds and Ends is the first official art book of the series. It features sketches and illustrations from volumes 1 to 10, as well illustrations from the author's previous work, Crimson-Shell. There is. is the second official art book released after the conclusion of Pandora Hearts, containing other illustrations made for the series along with art for Boukyaku no Haou Roland and other Monthly GFantasy and Monthly Gangan Joker series. The book also features the first two official illustrations for Mochizuki's next series, The Case Study of Vanitas.

==== Light novels ====
Three light novels were featured alongside the manga as side stories accompanying the Pandora Hearts universe. The novels were all written by Shinobu Wakamiya and illustrated by Pandora Hearts' own author, Jun Mochizuki. The titles are Pandora Hearts ~Caucus Race~ Volume 1, Pandora Hearts ~Caucus Race~ Volume 2, and Pandora Hearts ~Caucus Race~ Volume 3.

=== Audio ===
The anime's first opening theme was released as a maxi-single, "Parallel Hearts", on April 29, 2009, under the Victor Entertainment label. The single was performed by FictionJunction and included two tracks, "Parallel Hearts" and "Hitomi no Chikara", with lyrics, composition and arrangement by Yuki Kajiura, and peaked with a ranking of 20th on the Oricon singles charts.

The first ending theme "Maze" by Savage Genius was released on June 3, 2009, under Victor Entertainment, and peaked at 35th in the Oricon singles chart. The second ending theme is "Watashi wo Mitsukete" by Savage Genius. The first anime album Pandora hearts Original Soundtracks 1 was released July 8, 2009, under Victor Entertainment, and peaked at 104th on Oricon albums chart. A drama CD entitled Pandora Hearts Drama CD was released on December 21, 2007, under Frontier works.

=== Musical ===
A musical adaptation of the manga was performed at Theater H in Tokyo from November 7–16, 2025. Akira Yamazaki directed the musical and wrote the screenplays, while Ako Takahashi wrote the lyrics and Harumi Fuki was in charge of music. A second musical, Pandora Hearts Retrace II: Madness of Lost Memory, is set to run at Theater H in Tokyo from October 2–12, 2026, and at Theater Kobe in Hyogo from October 16–18.

== Reception ==
By March 2021, Pandora Hearts had over 5.5 million copies in circulation. The eighth volume of Pandora Hearts was ranked 21st on the Tohan charts between March 24 and 30, 2009, and 19th between March 31 and April 6, 2009. Volume nine was ranked number one between July 27 and August 2. The twenty third and twenty fourth volumes ranked 16 and 14, respectively, between June 29 and July 5, 2015.

Kim Morrissy of Anime News Network called it as "one of the defining manga of the 00s and early 2010s".
