= Little Glee Monster =

Japanese girl vocal group

Little Glee Monster リトル グリー モンスター
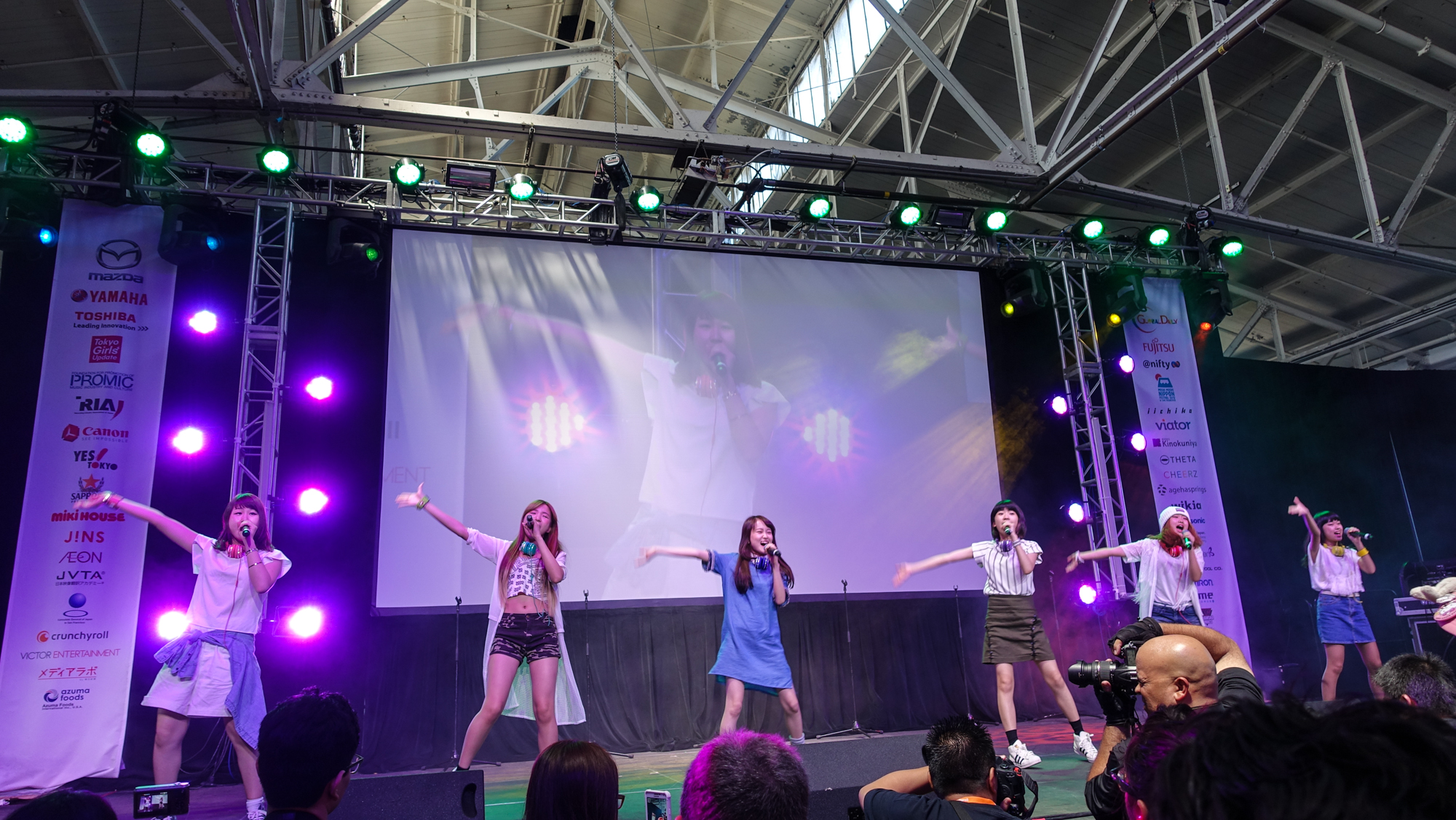
- Little Glee Monster at J-Pop Summit 2015, San Francisco

Background information
- Also known as: LGM; Little Glee
- Origin: Japan
- Genre: J-pop
- Years active: 2013–present
- Label: Sony Music Entertainment Japan
- Members: Asahi Kobayashi; Mayu Yoshida; Karen Koga; Mika Fujihira; Yumi Nagai; Kamala Miyu Aida
- Past members: Yuka Sakamoto; Lina Yoshimura; Maju Arai; Serina Hasegawa; Manaka Fukumoto
- Website: www.littlegleemonster.com

Little Glee Monster (リトル グリー モンスター, Ritoru Gurī Monsutā) is a Japanese girl vocal group, formed in 2013. The group currently consists of Asahi Kobayashi, Mayu Yoshida, Karen Koga, Mika Fujihira, Yumi Nagai, and Kamala Miyu Aida. They were signed to Sony Music Entertainment Japan and released their debut single “Houkago High Five” in 2014. Their fifth album, Flava, is their most successful album, peaking at number one on both Oricon and Japan's Billboard charts, and certified Gold by the Recording Industry Association of Japan for sales of 100,000. In 2018, they won an award at the 2018 MTV Europe Music Awards for Best Japanese Act. In July 2022, following the extended absence and ultimate resignation of two original members for health reasons, Watanabe Entertainment and Sony Music jointly established the "Monster Groove Lab" to audition new members. From the audition process, three new singers joined in November 2022.

In 2025, their song "For Decades" was chosen to be the season support song for the J-League.

== Members ==
Current members

- Asahi Kobayashi (小林あさひ) (2013–present)
- Mayu Yoshida (吉田真悠) (2013–present)
- Karen Koga (古賀かれん) (2013–present)
- Mika Fujihira (藤平美香) (2022–present)
- Yumi Nagai (永井結海) (2022–present)
- Kamala Miyu Aida (カマラみゆアイダ) (2022–present)

Former members

- Lina Yoshimura (吉村リナ) (2013)
- Yuka Sakamoto (坂本有香) (2013)
- Maju Arai (荒井麻珠) (2013-2017)
- Manaka Fukumoto (福本まなか) (2013-2022)
- Serina Hasegawa (長谷川芹奈) (2013-2022)

== Discography ==
=== Studio albums ===
Title	Album details	Peak chart positions		Certifications
Title	Album details	JPN Oricon	JPN Billboard	Certifications
Little Glee Monster	Released: March 16, 2014; November 9, 2016 (re-released); Label: Samba Free, Sony Music (re-released); Formats: CD, digital download	7	7	
Colorful Monster	Released: January 6, 2016; Label: Sony Music; Formats: CD, digital download	4	3	
Joyful Monster	Released: January 6, 2017; Label: Sony Music; Formats: CD, digital download	4	4	
Juice	Released: January 17, 2018; Label: Sony Music; Formats: CD, digital download	2	2	RIAJ: Gold
Flava	Released: January 16, 2019; Label: Sony Music; Formats: CD, digital download, streaming	1	1	RIAJ: Gold
Bright New World	Released: February 12, 2020; Label: Sony Music; Formats: CD, digital download, streaming	1	1	
Journey	Released: April 20, 2022; Label: Sony Music; Formats: CD, digital download, streaming	2	2	
Unlock!	Released: March 20, 2024; Label: Sony Music; Formats: CD, digital download, streaming	4	5	
Ambitious	Released: March 19, 2025; Label: Sony Music; Formats: CD, digital download, streaming	4	—	
Breath	Released: September 16, 2026; Label: Sony Music; Formats: 2×CD, digital download, streaming	14	—	

=== Extended plays ===
Title	EP details	Peak chart positions	Sales
Title	EP details	JPN Oricon	Sales
I Feel the Light	Released: December 11, 2019; Label: Sony Music; Formats: CD, digital download, streaming	5	JPN: 14,872
Re-union	Released: September 22, 2021; Label: Sony Music; Formats: CD, digital download, streaming	4	JPN: 20,272
Fanfare	Released: March 22, 2023; Label: Sony Music; Formats: CD, digital download, streaming	6	JPN: 12,313

=== Singles ===
Title	Year	Peak positions	Notes	Album
Title	Year	JPN Oricon	Notes	Album
"Houkago High Five" (放課後ハイファイブ, "After School High Five")	2014	18		Colorful Monster
"Seishun Photograph / Girls be Free!" (青春フォトグラフ/Girls be Free!)	2015	25		Colorful Monster
"Jinsei wa Ichido Kiri / Roaring All-Stars" (人生は一度きり/ガオガオ・オールスター)	2015	14	"Roaring All-Star" was used as the fourth ending theme for the anime Pokémon: XY.	Colorful Monster
"Suki da." (好きだ。, "Love")	2015	6		Colorful Monster
"My Best Friend"	2016	5		Joyful Monster
"Watashi Rashiku Ikite Mitai / Kimi no You ni Naritai" (私らしく生きてみたい/君のようになりたい)	2016	6		Joyful Monster
"Hajimari no Uta" (はじまりのうた, "First Song")	2016	17		Joyful Monster
"Dakara, Hitori Janai" (だから、ひとりじゃない, "Therefore, I'm not Alone")	2017	3	First ending theme for the anime My Hero Academia Season 2.	Juice
"Ashita e" (明日へ, "To Tomorrow")	2017	2		Juice
"Over / Hikaru Kakera" (Over/ヒカルカケラ)	2017	6	"Over" was used as the second opening theme for the anime Boruto: Naruto Next Generations.	Juice
"Gyutto / Close to You" (ギュッと/Close to You, "Tightly / Close to You")	2018	6		Flava
"Sekai wa Anata ni Waraikakete Iru" (世界はあなたに笑いかけている, "The World Is Smiling at You")	2018	6		Flava
"Natsu ni Natte Utae" (夏になって歌え, "Sing in Summer")	2018	34		Flava
"Kimi ni Todoku Made" (君に届くまで, "Until I Reach You")	2019	4	First ending theme for the anime Mix.	Bright New World
"Echo"	2019	6		Bright New World
"Ashiato" (足跡, "Footprints")	2020	5		Gradati∞n
"Dear My Friend" (featuring Pentatonix)	2020	9		Gradati∞n
"Toumei na Sekai" (透明な世界, "Transparent World")	2021	9	Ending theme for the anime Yashahime: Princess Half-Demon Season 2.	Journey
"Your Name"	2022	7	Opening theme for the anime The Case Study of Vanitas Part 2.	Journey
"Magic! / Ikinakucha" (Magic!/生きなくちゃ)	2022	6		Non-album single
"Ima Kono Toki wo" (今この瞬間を)	2023	7		Unlock!
"Up to Me!"	2023	4		Unlock!
"Origami"	2024	8		TBA
"Break Out of Your Bubble"	2024	8		TBA
"Yume Janai Nara Nana no sa" (夢じゃないならなんなのさ)	2025	7	Ending theme for the anime Rock Is a Lady's Modesty.	TBA
"Ichirin" / "Pages" (一輪/Pages)	2026	5		TBA

=== Other songs ===
- "Gao Gao Orusutā" (Ending song from Pokémon: XY)
- "Colorful" (collaboration song for Coca-Cola and the Olympics)

== Awards and nominations ==
Year	Award	Category	Nominee/work	Result
2018	MTV Video Music Awards Japan	Best Cinematography	"Sekai wa Anata ni Waraikakete Iru"	Won
2018	MTV Europe Music Awards	Best Japanese Act	Little Glee Monster	Won
2020	MTV Video Music Awards Japan	Best Pop Video	"Ashiato"	Won
