= Your Name (disambiguation) =

Your Name is a 2016 Japanese animated film written and directed by Makoto Shinkai.

Your Name may also refer to:

== Literature ==
- Your Name (novel), a Japanese light novel based on the film

== Music ==
=== Albums ===
- Your Name (album), soundtrack album by Radwimps, 2016

=== Songs ===
- "Your Name" (song), by Little Glee Monster, 2022
- "Your Name", by Paul Baloche, 2006
- "Your Name", by Shea Couleé from 8, 2023
- "Your Name", by Heize, 2020
- "Your Name", by Joy, 2022
- "Your Name", by Phillips, Craig and Dean, 2007
- "Your Name", by Misha Smirnov, 2018
- "Your Name", by Young JV, 2012
