= Your Name (song) =

2022 single by Little Glee Monster

Single by Little Glee Monster

from the album Journey
- Released: March 2, 2022
- Recorded: 2021–2022
- Genre: J-pop; anime song
- Length: 3:38
- Label: Sony Japan
- Composers: Kuwagata Fukino; Koudai Iwatsubo
- Lyricist: Koudai Iwatsubo
- Producers: Kuwagata Fukino; Koudai Iwatsubo

Alternative cover
- Limited anime edition cover

"Your Name" is a song by Little Glee Monster. It was released as the group's 19th single by Sony Music Records on March 2, 2022. It was used as the opening theme of the second half of the anime The Case Study of Vanitas.

== Overview ==
The title song "Your Name" is an anime tie-up appointed as the opening theme of the TV anime The Case Study of Vanitas, and was released in three forms: regular edition, first edition edition, and limited edition edition. Blu-ray is included in the first edition and limited edition edition. In addition, it has become a continuous animation tie-up from the previous work.

The coupling includes a cover of Remioromen's "March 9", which has become a staple of graduation songs. However, he did not participate in this song because it was recorded after Serina, a member of the group, got sick at the end of 2021 and announced a long suspension of activities. In addition, a music video was produced and Sakura Endo, a member of Nogizaka46, appears in the video. Prior to the release of the package, "Your Name" was downloaded from February 16 and "March 9th" will be released from February 23 through various downloads and subscription services. The PV location is Miura City, Kanagawa Prefecture. While the Amazon version features two hands holding each other, the Square Enix one features an illustration of the two protagonists from the series: Vanitas and Noe Archiviste.

Singer Mayu said that her siblings are fan of The Case Study of Vanitas so she wanted to make it as appealing as possible. She said the theme was different from their previous works, giving a suspicious feeling and sad feeling that fits the anime. Manaka referred to it as gothic based on the rearrangements. It uses few chorus while the vocals were called simple though Manaka said that Mayu's parts make it interesting. Manaka thought that the first half of the song was a song with a lot of breath from the members, so she was conscious of singing in a way that suits the mature atmosphere. After all, she always listen to the take of the member who sang before in order to be influenced. In retrospect, Mayu found it challenging.

== Music video ==
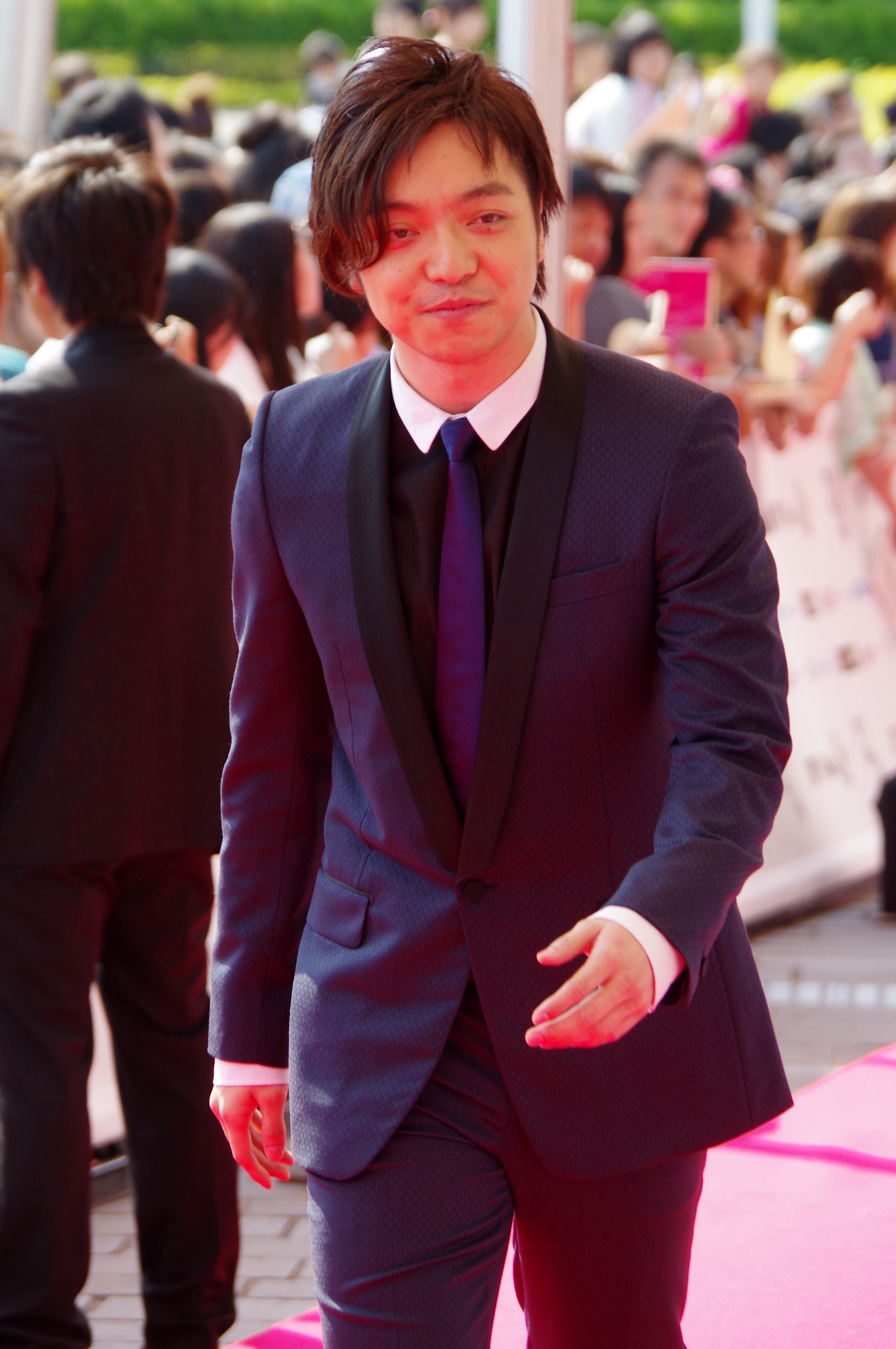
Daichi Miura produced the music video

The music video for the new song "Your Name" was choreographed by Daichi Miura. It is a video work that embodies a "new world view that has never existed before". It is shot in a majestic chapel with large stained glass, suitable for a love song singing philosophical love, is composed mainly of dance performances that are linked to the world view of animation, along with supporting Shingo Okamoto. Miura, who witnessed the shooting, also said, he was happy to be asked to choreograph this time. He thought brought out the new charm of Ritoguri through dance. Everyone carefully caught the detailed but very important parts and practiced many times. Karen, a member, said she very honored to have Daichi Miura choreograph. Ochi and Shingo came to the rehearsal many times while she was busy. She hopes people can enjoy the songs of our Your Name with Ochi's choreography.

== Track listing ==
Normal edition

All music is composed by King Gnu.

CD-DA、
No.	Title	Length
1.	"Your Name"	3:10
2.	"March 9"	4:37
3.	"Hurry up!! -Live on 2021.12.21-"	3:42
4.	"Your Name -Lead Off ver.-"	3:37
Total length:		15:37

First edition

All music is composed by King Gnu.

CD-DA、
No.	Title	Length
1.	"Your Name"	3:10
2.	"March 9"	4:37
3.	"愛しさにリボンをかけて -Live on 2021.12.21-"	5:09
4.	"Your Name -Lead Off ver.-"	3:37
Total length:		15:37

Limited edition

All music is composed by King Gnu.

CD-DA、
No.	Title	Length
1.	"Your Name"	3:38
2.	"March 9"	4:37
3.	"Classic -Live on 2021.12.21-"	4:35
4.	"Your Name -TV Size-"	1:30
Total length:		14:20

== Reception ==
The song peaked at the 9th position of the Oricon charts. Real Sound regarded the lyrics as being more mature to the group's themes.
