= Crimson-Shell =

Japanese manga series

- First tankōbon volume cover
- Genre: Fantasy
- Manga
- Written by: Jun Mochizuki
- Published by: Square Enix
- English publisher: NA: Yen Press
- Magazine: Monthly GFantasy
- Original run: August 18, 2005 – January 18, 2006
- Volumes: 1

Crimson-Shell is a Japanese manga series written and illustrated by Jun Mochizuki. It was serialized in Square Enix's Monthly GFantasy from August 2005 to January 2006, with its chapters collected in a single tankōbon volume.

== Publication ==
Written and illustrated by Jun Mochizuki, Crimson-Shell was serialized in Square Enix's shōnen manga magazine Monthly GFantasy from August 18, 2005, to January 18, 2006. The chapters were collected into a single tankōbon volume, which was released on March 27, 2006.

In April 2009, Yen Press announced they licensed the series for English publication. They released the volume on November 17, 2009.

== Reception ==
Chris Beveridge from The Fandom Post praised the art, while noted that the plot "feels like only a taste of what [the plot] could have been". Unlike Beveridge, Koiwai from Manga News praised the art and the story, while also recommending the series to fans of the author's next work, Pandora Hearts. Christel Scheja from Splash Comics shared similar opinions to Beveridge, stating that "Crimson Shell is one of those titles that you can read if you do not know many other mystery titles".
