= The Case Study of Vanitas =

Japanese manga series by Jun Mochizuki

- First tankōbon volume cover, featuring Vanitas

ヴァニタスの手記(カルテ) (Vanitasu no Karute)
- Genre: Dark fantasy; Steampunk; Supernatural
- Manga
- Written by: Jun Mochizuki
- Published by: Square Enix
- English publisher: NA: Yen Press
- Magazine: Monthly Gangan Joker
- Original run: December 22, 2015 – present
- Volumes: 11
- Anime television series
- The Case Study of Vanitas (2021–2022)
- icon

The Case Study of Vanitas (Japanese: ヴァニタスの手記(カルテ), Hepburn: Vanitasu no Karute) is a Japanese manga series written and illustrated by Jun Mochizuki. It has been serialized in Square Enix's shōnen manga magazine Monthly Gangan Joker since December 2015. In North America, the manga is published in English by Yen Press.

The Case Study of Vanitas is set in a fictional 19th-century Paris and contains vampire and steampunk themes. The story focuses on the young Vanitas and the vampire Noé Archiviste in Vanitas's quest to heal cursed vampires through his grimoire called The Book of Vanitas. Mochizuki was heavily inspired to write Vanitas following her first visit to France as well as by vampire films. She aimed to surpass her previous work, Pandora Hearts, by drawing more appealing fight scenes and focusing more on the themes involving hidden identities. An anime television series adaptation produced by Bones aired from July 2021 to April 2022.

By June 2021, The Case Study of Vanitas had over 5.5 million copies in circulation. The manga has been praised for the handling of its two main characters and the use of action sequences combined with effective comedy. The anime adaptation enjoyed a similar reception for its visuals and fantasy elements.

== Plot ==
During an airship ride to Paris, the vampire Noé Archiviste meets Vanitas, a human claiming to be a vampire doctor who cures vampires of the malnomen, which causes them to behave predatorily against their will. The book with which he heals, The Book of Vanitas, is connected to the original Vanitas, the Vampire of the Blue Moon, hated by the Vampires of the Red Moon who form the traditional vampire society. Noé and Vanitas join forces to heal vampires, but there lurks a threat of some unknown force named Charlatan, which may be responsible for corrupting the sick vampires.

== Production ==
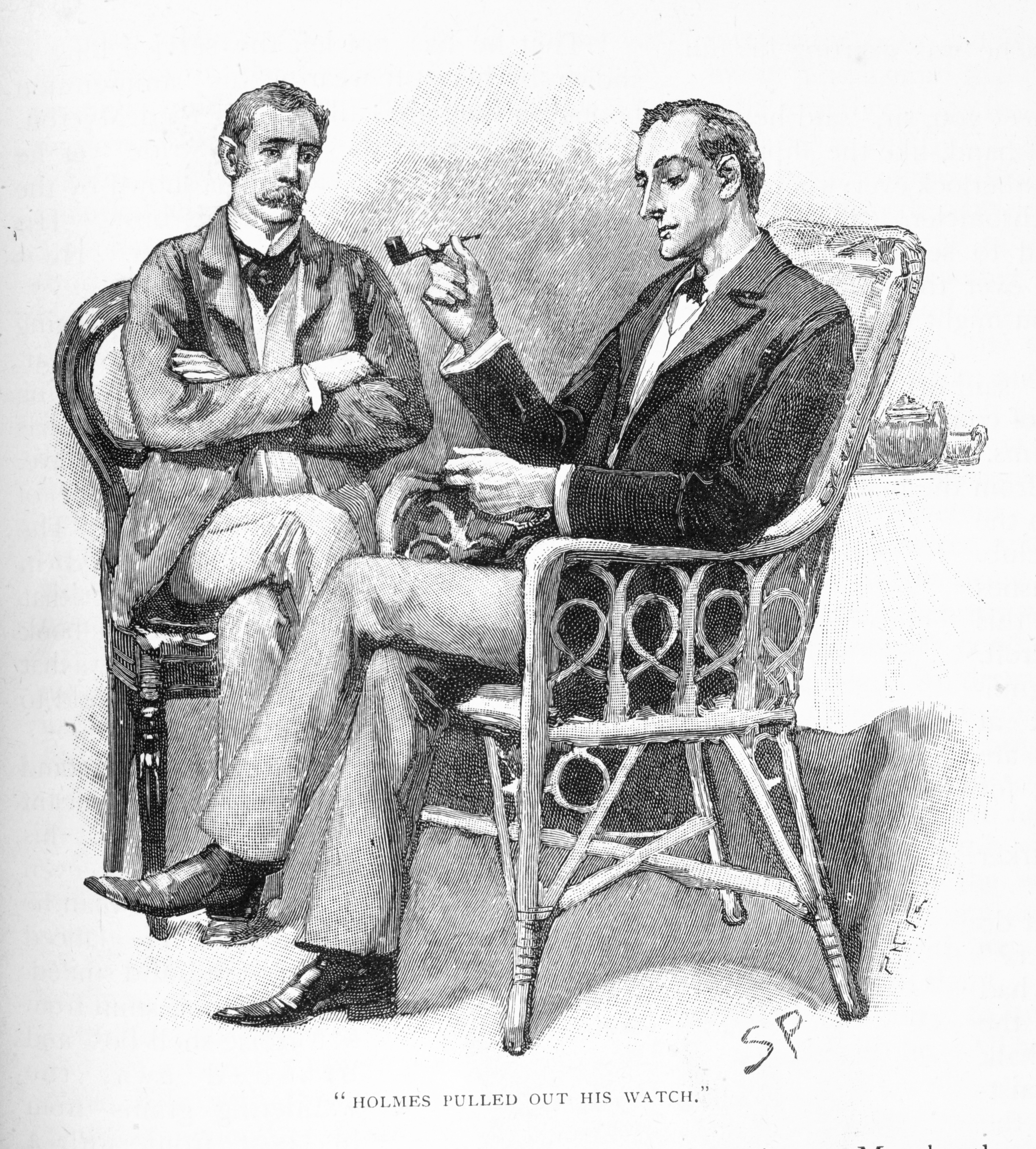
The series's leading duo was inspired by Holmes and Watson

Following the completion of her manga Pandora Hearts, Jun Mochizuki expressed a desire to create a work featuring vampires in a high school setting. The character Vanitas was the first she conceived, during a trip to France. While visiting Mont Saint-Michel, she considered the premise of a solitary vampire who had watched over an island for a hundred years; this initial idea subsequently informed the development of the series and the general designs of Vanitas and Noé. Mochizuki had several intentions for her post–Pandora Hearts work, including an increased emphasis on romance and battle elements, though her head editor advised her to reduce these aspects due to her perceived inexperience with them. She resolved to continue drawing them, believing that practice would improve her skill. The steampunk setting was chosen because the author had long been a fan of the genre and wished to create a contrast with her previous work.

One of Mochizuki's influences for a vampire narrative was the 1994 film Interview with the Vampire, itself based on the novel by Anne Rice. Upon viewing it, she was captivated by the tragic and ephemeral nature of vampires and their blood-sucking scenes, impressions that became firmly established in her mind. The film also reinforced her preference for stories centred on the dynamic between a young man and a girl, which influenced her handling of the protagonists. Paris was the first foreign city she visited, and it left a strong impression; she had been invited as a guest to Japan Expo, and her fondness for the city influenced Noé's own attachment to it, ultimately leading her to set the manga in France. The Paladins of the Catholic Church are based on the legend of Charlemagne; while the characters in Vanitas are not intended to be the same figures from the legend, Mochizuki enjoyed exploring shared relationship dynamics and character traits. She acknowledged that vampire stories had been extensively explored and sought to distinguish her work by examining vampire weaknesses, which she believed could offer a fresh perspective.

In the initial conception, Vanitas was a vampire and Noé was human. Drawing inspiration from Sherlock Holmes, Mochizuki assigned Vanitas the role of Holmes and Noé that of Dr. Watson. However, her supervisor criticised the concept as generic, a view she ultimately shared; a suggestion to swap the protagonists' roles resulted in a more striking dynamic. A friend's criticism of Vanitas's design led to the addition of his two-level side bangs. Noé's design also underwent significant changes from the early drafts; he originally wore glasses and was conceived as the straight man of the duo, but these and other ideas were abandoned. Because of the leads' contrasting natures, Mochizuki wrote them so as to avoid developing a friendship. While she had no specific fixations regarding facial expressions, she often redrew panels multiple times to achieve the desired effect. Rather than creating villains, she aimed to make all characters relatable, and sought to address flaws she perceived in Pandora Hearts, including the inclusion of meaningless deaths.

=== Themes ===
The series explores themes of existence and identity, which Mochizuki considered more central to Vanitas than to Pandora Hearts or her other work Crimson-Shell, both of which also employ these elements. She intended to gradually reveal what lay hidden in her characters' hearts, and as she explored these depths, the questions of identity and the meaning of existence inevitably arose. From the outset, Vanitas was conceived as a character who exuded freedom and eccentricity, acting on whatever intrigued him; this provided a balance with Noé, who is pure, kind, and possesses a strong sense of justice and responsibility. Ultimately, she saw the two as complementary. Possessing a grimoire capable of saving cursed vampires, Vanitas's duties are central to the manga, as Mochizuki intended to portray themes of identity that could be lost and recovered.

Regarding the concept of vampires' true names, Mochizuki acknowledged that this idea appears frequently in Japanese video games, anime, and fantasy manga, and was not her own invention. However, she introduced it for specific narrative reasons. The concept of Vanitas as a vampire saviour had already been established, but she needed a method to visually depict his healing of vampires; performing conventional medical procedures did not interest her, and she doubted her readers would find it appealing. She therefore sought a more conceptual approach, leading to the use of the true-name concept.

== Media ==
=== Manga ===
Written and illustrated by Jun Mochizuki, The Case Study of Vanitas started in Square Enix's Monthly Gangan Joker on December 22, 2015. In April 2020, Mochizuki announced that the manga would be on hiatus due to the COVID-19 pandemic; it resumed publication in November of the same year. It went on hiatus again in June 2022 and is set to resume in May 2023. Square Enix has collected its chapters into individual tankōbon volumes. The first volume was released on April 22, 2016. As of April 22, 2024, eleven volumes have been released.

On December 3, 2015, Yen Press announced on its official Twitter account that it would be publishing new chapters of the series concurrently with Japan.

=== Anime ===
The manga was adapted into an anime television series by Bones and directed by Tomoyuki Itamura, with scripts overseen by Deko Akao, and character designs by Yoshiyuki Ito. Yuki Kajiura composed the series's music. The series aired in two split cours, with the first cours airing from July 3 to September 18, 2021, on Tokyo MX and other channels. (Note: Tokyo MX listed the series premiere at 24:00 on July 2, 2021, which is effectively at midnight on July 3 JST.) The second cours aired from January 15 to April 2, 2022.

== Reception ==
By June 2021, The Case Study of Vanitas had over 5.5 million copies in circulation. Upon its release, the Japanese volumes appeared in charts from Oricon.

Critics enjoyed the handling of Vanitas and the setting, praising the mix of action, humor and adventure, as well as Vanitas's relationship with Noé. The Fandom Post praised the first manga volume, which exceeded the reviewer's expectations. Melina Dargis from The Fandom Post also wanted the manga to be adapted into an anime in 2017. The focus on romance between arcs was praised for its handling of Vanitas as a hilarious character considering how poorly he reacts to his feelings towards Jeanne. Manga News praised the handling of Vanitas through his tragic backstory, and noted that Mochizuki's handling of narrations is hard to follow. In a subsequent review of the seventh volume, The Fandom Post praised the volume's dense mix of action and backstory, noting that while the artwork was less detailed than in previous volumes, the action scenes remained highly dynamic. El Palomitrón said that while there is no boys' love between the two leads due to the focus on other, more explored relationships, the reviewer found the connection between Vanitas and Noé to be deep and comparable to the one between Vanitas and Jeanne.

The art was praised by Otaku USA for its handling of a steampunk setting as well as the characterization of the title character. Manga News enjoyed the multiple character designs, spanning from bishonen types to built bodies who interact together. Although the manga is published in a shōnen magazine, the art was compared with "beautiful shojo-esque art style" by Comic Book Resources, making it equal to Pandora Hearts. The Fandom Post claimed the art was "stunning", praising the details of every page, including the fight sequences. Anime News Network felt that the artwork was inspired by folklore and found the artwork appealing, due to the multiple designs and setting but sometimes it was hard to follow.

== See also ==
- List of Square Enix manga franchises
