= Jun Mochizuki =

Japanese manga artist

Jun Mochizuki 望月 淳
- Born: December 22, 1980 (age 45) Kanagawa Prefecture, Japan
- Area: Manga artist
- Notable works: Pandora Hearts; The Case Study of Vanitas

Jun Mochizuki (Japanese: 望月 淳, Hepburn: Mochizuki Jun; born December 22) is a Japanese manga artist. She is best known for creating the manga series Pandora Hearts and The Case Study of Vanitas.

== Biography ==
Jun Mochizuki was born on December 22 in Kanagawa Prefecture. After graduating from high school, Mochizuki applied for an art school, but was ultimately not accepted into the school. Following this, she continued drawing and eventually submitted her work to Square Enix. Her first work was a one-shot titled Pandora Hearts. Following the one-shot's publication, she launched Crimson-Shell. It was serialized in Monthly GFantasy from September 2005 to February 2006.

Following Crimson-Shell's completion, she launched Pandora Hearts (different from the one-shot) in Monthly GFantasy on May 18, 2006. The series concluded in Monthly GFantasy on March 18, 2015. The series did well, and received an anime television series adaptation. Following Pandora Hearts' conclusion, she launched The Case Study of Vanitas in Monthly Gangan Joker on December 22, 2015. Like her previous series, The Case Study of Vanitas also received an anime television series adaptation, which premiered in July 2021.

== Influences ==
Mochizuki has cited Fullmetal Alchemist's author Hiromu Arakawa as her main source for inspiration. Arakawa was the reason Mochizuki chose to submit to Square Enix instead of other manga publishers.

== Works ==
- Crimson-Shell (2005–2006, serialized in Monthly GFantasy, 1 volume)
- Pandora Hearts (2006–2015, serialized in Monthly GFantasy, 24 volumes)
- The Case Study of Vanitas (2015–present, serialized in Monthly Gangan Joker, 11 volumes)
