= Sepia =

Sepia may refer to:

== Color ==
- Sepia (color), a reddish-brown color
- Sepia tone, a photography technique

== Music ==
- Sepia, a 2001 album by Coco Mbassi
- Sepia, a 2002 album by Yu Takahashi
- "Sepia" (song), by the Manic Street Preachers
- "Sepia", a song on the album Perfecto Presents Ibiza by Paul Oakenfold
- "Sepia", a 2011 song on the album "INDEPENDENT" by Indigo Jam Unit
- "Sepia" (Plan B song), a song on the album Heaven Before All Hell Breaks Loose

== Other uses ==
- Sepia (cephalopod), a genus of cuttlefish
- Sepia (restaurant), a New American restaurant in Chicago
- Sepia (magazine), an African American-focused photojournalism magazine
- Sepia, a nickname of Renfe Class 120 / 121, electric trains used in Spain
- Sepia, a character in the sci-fi anime Fight! Iczer One

== See also ==
- Sepia Jack (John Christian Schetky, 1778–1874), Scottish marine painter
