= My Favorite Tune =

Live album by Ryo Fukui
- Released: August 5, 1994
- Recorded: June 4 & 5, 1994
- Venues: The Lutheran Hall, Sapporo, Japan
- Genre: Jazz
- Length: 43:30
- Label: Sapporo Jazz Create

Ryo Fukui chronology
Mellow Dream (1977)	My Favorite Tune (1994)	Ryo Fukui Live in New York (1999)

My Favorite Tune is a 1994 live album by jazz pianist Ryo Fukui. It was released on the Sapporo Jazz Create label on vinyl LP and CD. The album was recorded at The Lutheran Hall in Sapporo, Japan, and was Fukui's only live solo recording. The album was described as "a beautiful bop adventure", comparing it to "a cool summer night, full of contemplative notes and deep feelings", blending Fukui's original compositions with his take on popular standards by Sonny Clark and Avery Parrish. According to his wife, Yasuko, the album sold over 1000 copies.

== Track listing ==
1. "Voyage" (Ryo Fukui) – 3:31
2. "Scenery" (Ryo Fukui) – 3:55
3. "Mellow Dream" (Ryo Fukui) – 10:14
4. "Nobody Knows the Trouble I've Seen" (traditional) – 5:37
5. "Nobody's" (Barry Harris) – 3:39
6. "My Conception" (Sonny Clark) – 3:50
7. "After Hours" (Avery Parrish) – 7:46
8. "Nord" (Ryo Fukui) – 4:58
