= Japanese jazz =

Music genre in Japan

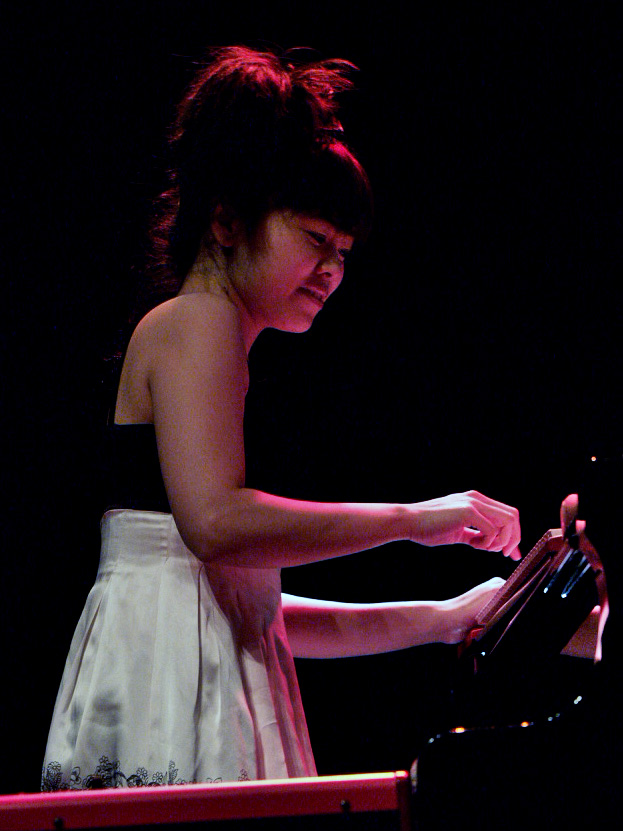
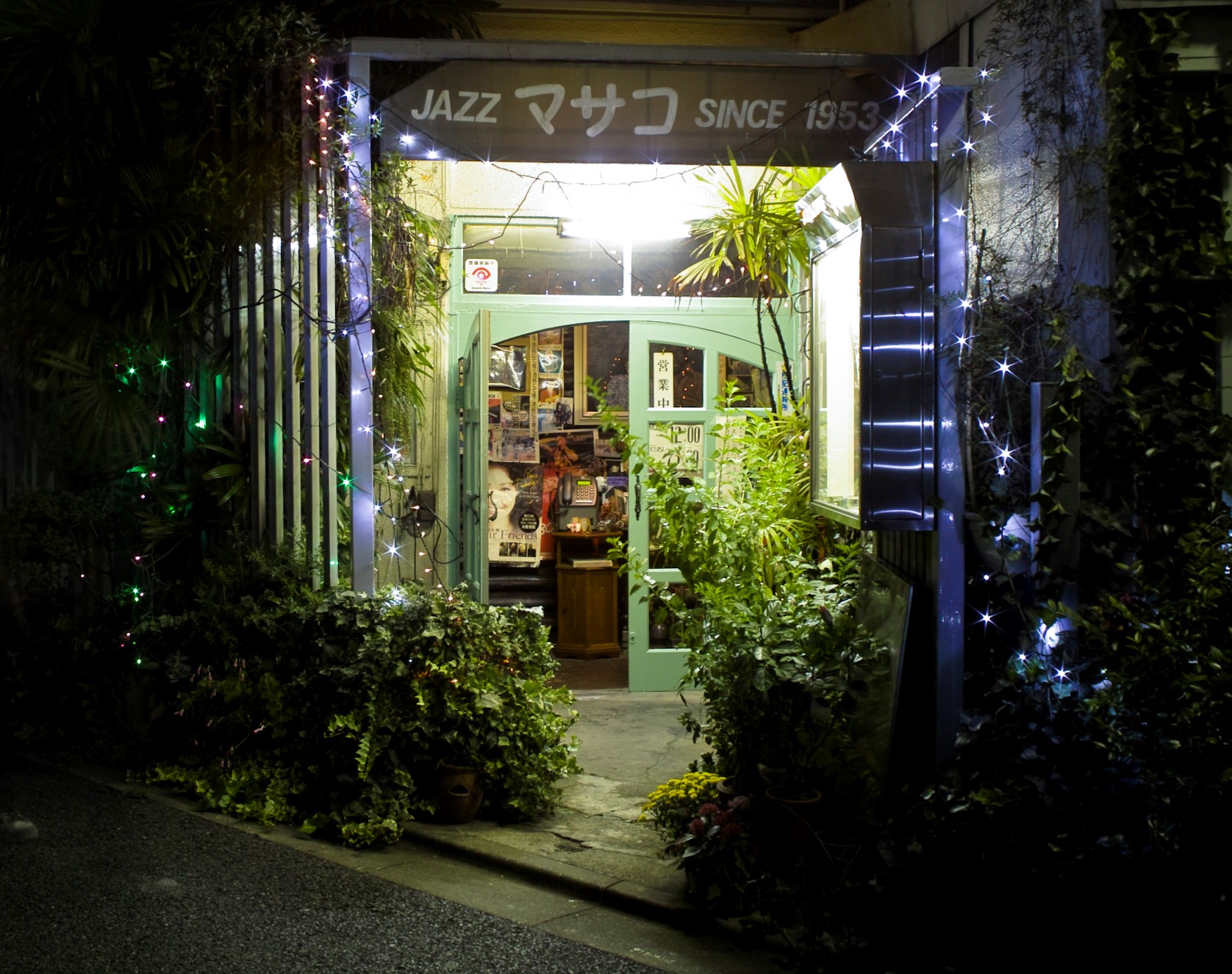
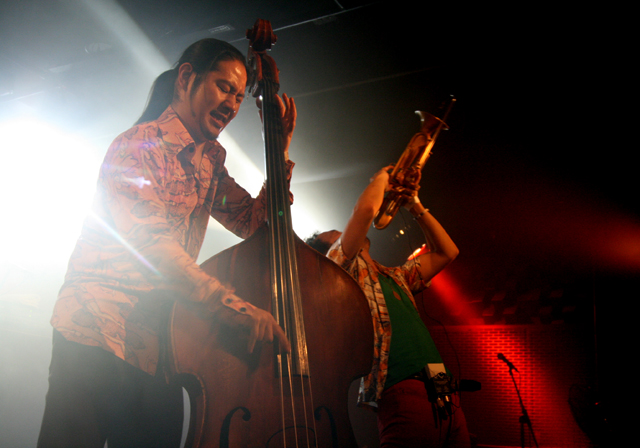
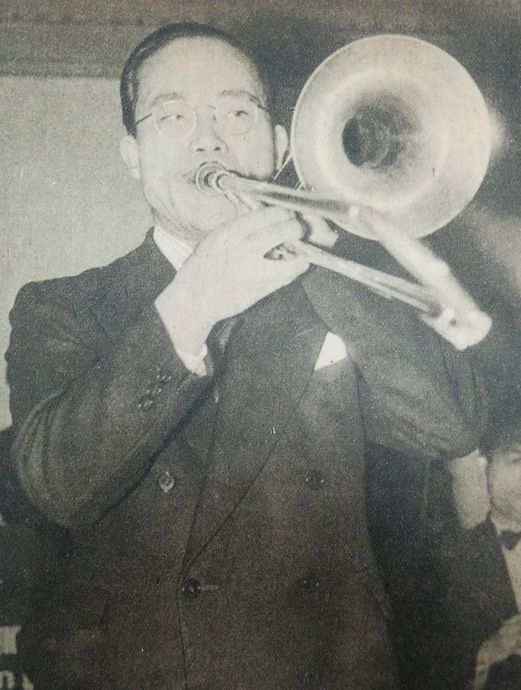
Clockwise from upper left: Jazz composer and pianist Hiromi Uehara, a Jazu Kissa jazz café in Tokyo, trombone player Taniguchi Mataji in 1948, and Soil & "Pimp" Sessions' double bassist Akita Goldman.

Japanese jazz (Japanese: 日本のジャズ, Nihon no jazu) is jazz played by Japanese musicians or jazz connected to Japan or Japanese culture. According to some estimates, Japan has the largest proportion of jazz fans in the world.

Jazz was introduced to Japan in the 1910s through transpacific ocean liners, where Filipino musicians took influences from jazz, with the Philippines being an American colony at the time. Following the rise of the music recording industry, the lyrics of popular jazz records such as "The Sheik of Araby" and "My Blue Heaven" were translated into Japanese. Jazz was associated with Japanese counterparts to flappers and dandies and often played in dance halls. Although considered "enemy music" in Japan during World War II, due to its American roots, the genre was too popular for a ban, and many disobeyed the state-mandated destruction of jazz records.

During the occupation of Japan following World War II, there was a large demand for entertainment for American troops, and jazz was particularly popular. By the 1970s, the Japanese economic miracle paved the way for Japanese jazz musicians to achieve international fame, along with new musical genres such as city pop, kankyō ongaku, and Japanese folk music. Japanese jazz musicians also began to evolve past Blue Note mimicry and experimented with free jazz, fusion funk, and bebop, among others. This furthered the distinct sound of Japanese jazz. During the 1980s, digital music technology began to influence Japanese jazz.

In present-day Japan, jazz has become more of an alternative genre. It is no longer as popular, but retains the largest proportion of jazz fans in the world. Jazu Kissa (literally jazz café), (Note: Alternatively, since "Kissa" means "have a cup of tea", "Jazu kissa" could be interpreted as "a place where you can listen to jazz while drinking tea.") dedicated spaces where aficionados gather to listen to jazz records, appeared in the 1950s and 60s. A phenomenon unique to the country, there are roughly 600 Jazu Kissa in present-day Japan, including some where conversation is prohibited. Recently, (Note: As of 2020.) there has also been an increase in Jazu Kissa in rural areas. Contemporary Japanese jazz musicians include Hiromi Uehara, Kyoto Jazz Massive, United Future Organization and Soil & "Pimp" Sessions.

== History ==
Jazz became popular in Japan in the 1920s, following visits by bands from America and the Philippines, where American popular music had been introduced by the occupying forces. The Hatano Jazz Band is sometimes described as the first Japanese jazz band, although they were primarily a dance band. The band, which was created in 1912 by graduates from Tokyo Music School, absorbed and performed American dance music after traveling to San Francisco, but their music did not claim to feature jazz improvisation.

Local jazz practice, built around the performances of visiting Filipinos, began to emerge in the early 1920s, most notably in the prosperous entertainment districts of Osaka and Kobe. By 1924, the city of Osaka already boasted twenty dance halls, which gave many Japanese-born musicians an opportunity to play jazz professionally. Trumpeter Fumio Nanri (1910–1975) was the first of these Japanese jazz performers to gain international acclaim for his playing style. In 1929 Nanri traveled to Shanghai, where he played with American jazz pianist Teddy Weatherford, and in 1932 he toured in the United States. After his return to Japan, Nanri made several recordings with his band Hot Peppers, an American-style swing band.

The "Americanness" and mass appeal of early jazz as dance music gave reason for concern among the conservative Japanese elite, and in 1927 Osaka municipal officials issued ordinances that forced the dance halls to close. A large number of young musicians switched to the jazz scene in Tokyo, where some found employment in the house jazz orchestras of the major recording companies.

In 1933 Chigusa, Japan's surviving oldest jazz cafe, or Jazu kissa, opened in Yokohama. Since then, jazz coffeehouses have provided a popular alternative to the dance hall, offering the latest jazz records (while occasionally also hosting live performances) to an attentively listening audience. In the 1930s, popular song composers Ryoichi Hattori and Koichi Sugii tried to overcome jazz music's controversial qualities by creating a distinctively Japanese kind of jazz music. They reworked ancient Japanese folk or theatre songs with a jazz touch, and in addition wrote new jazz songs that had Japanese thematic content and often closely resembled well-known traditional melodies. Hattori's songs, however, flirted with controversy, most notably in his 1940 Shortage Song (タリナイ・ソング, Tarinai songu), which he wrote for Tadaharu Nakano's Rhythm Boys. Satirizing the shortages of food and material then widespread in Japan, the song drew the ire of government censors and was quickly banned. The controversy was among the factors that led to the Rhythm Boys' breakup in 1941.

During World War II, jazz was considered "enemy music" and banned in Japan. However, by then the genre had become far too popular for a complete ban to be successful. Jazz-like songs, sometimes of a strongly patriotic type, continued to be performed, though these songs were usually referred to as "light music." Despite the state mandated destruction of jazz records, many did not comply, and hid their records until the aftermath of the war. After the war, the Allied occupation of Japan provided a new incentive for Japanese jazz musicians to emerge, as the American troops were eager to hear the music they listened to back home. Pianist Toshiko Akiyoshi (born 1929) arrived in Tokyo in 1948, determined to become a professional jazz musician. After having formed the Cozy Quartet she was then noticed by Hampton Hawes, who was stationed in Yokohama with his military band, and brought to the attention of Oscar Peterson. Akiyoshi studied at Berklee College of Music in Boston in 1956, and later achieved worldwide success as a bop pianist and big band leader.

By the end of the 1950s, native jazz practice again flourished in Japan, and in the following decades an active free jazz scene reached its full growth. Critic Teruto Soejima considered 1969 as a pivotal year for Japanese free jazz, with musicians such as drummer Masahiko Togashi, guitarist Masayuki Takayanagi, pianists Yosuke Yamashita and Masahiko Satoh, saxophonist Kaoru Abe, bassist Motoharu Yoshizawa, and trumpeter Itaru Oki playing a major role. Other Japanese jazz artists who acquired international reputations include Sadao Watanabe (the former soloist of Akiyoshi's Cozy Quartet), Ryo Kawasaki, Teruo Nakamura, Toru "Tiger" Okoshi and Makoto Ozone. Most of these musicians have toured extensively in the United States and some have moved there permanently for a career in jazz performance or education.

== Jazz and Japanese culture ==
Japanese jazz had frequently been criticized as derivative, or even as an unworthy imitation of U.S. jazz, both by American and Japanese commentators. In response to the belittling attitude of their audience, Japanese jazz artists began adding a "national flavor" to their work in the 1960s. Expatriate Toshiko Akiyoshi drew on Japanese culture in compositions for the big band she co-led with her husband and long-term collaborator Lew Tabackin. On Kogun (1974) they first utilized traditional instruments, such as the tsuzumi, and Long Yellow Road (1975) features an adaptation of a melody from the Japanese tradition of court music ("Children in the Temple Ground"). Inspired by the analogies Akiyoshi presented to him between jazz music and Zen Buddhism, jazz writer William Minor has suggested that a Zen aesthetic can be perceived in the music of Masahiko Satoh and other Japanese jazz artists. Japanese musician Minoru Muraoka chose to apply his skill with the traditional shakuhachi woodwind instrument, which plays in the minor pentatonic scale, to a Jazz context and recorded multiple albums featuring the instrument as a centerpiece. Muraoka helped to popularize the shakuhachi as a jazz instrument, a practice carried on today by musicians like the California-born Bruce Hebner and New York-based Zac Zinger. The Los Angeles-based smooth jazz band Hiroshima has always featured Asian Pacific American musicians who play or double on traditional Japanese instruments including the shakuhachi, koto, and taiko.

== Recent developments ==
=== 2000s ===
Around the turn of the millennium, Tokyo remained the base for a small but thriving jazz community. Jazz singer and pianist Ayado Chie managed to reach out to a larger audience (both in Japan and internationally) with her emulation of black American vocal jazz. In 2004, Blue Note Records released an album by 17-year-old mainstream and bop pianist Takashi (Matsunaga) featuring his own compositions, Storm Zone. Takashi's most recent CD is titled Love Makes the Earth Float (2008). In 2005 Japanese jazz group Soil & "Pimp" Sessions released their full-length debut Pimp Master, with tracks of the album gaining attention from DJs abroad and they began to receive heavy air-play on Gilles Peterson's Worldwide radio program on BBC Radio 1 in the UK. This got the album released in Europe on Compost and in UK on Peterson's Brownswood Recordings and subsequent albums by Soil & Pimp got released on Brownswood, making them arguably the most popular club jazz band to come out of Japan. Osaka based quartet Indigo jam unit have released eleven original and four cover albums since their debut with the album Demonstration in 2006 and have been described as a tight and energetic mix between a traditional jazz sound and nu jazz with distinctive beats and flowing jazz piano. After releasing their 11th album Lights in 2015, they announced that they would break up in summer of the following year

Jazz pianist Hiromi Uehara has received worldwide recognition since her debut in 2003 with Another Mind, which was a critical success in North America and in her native Japan, where the album shipped gold (100,000 units) and received the Recording Industry Association of Japan's (RIAJ) Jazz Album of the Year Award. In 2009, she recorded with pianist Chick Corea Duet, a two-disc live recording of their transcendent, transgenerational and transcultural duo concert in Tokyo. She also appeared on bassist Stanley Clarke’s Heads Up International release, Jazz in the Garden, which also featured former Chick Corea bandmate, drummer Lenny White. In 2011 Hiromi started her piano trio project, The Trio Project with Anthony Jackson and Simon Phillips and has released four albums under the name of this project. Recently not only does she play with jazz musicians but also she collaborates with notable J-pop musicians and bands and orchestras such as Akiko Yano, Dreams Come True, Tokyo Ska Paradise Orchestra, and New Japan Philharmonic. Additionally, the pianist Makoto Ozone collaborated with the prize-winning singer Kimiko Itoh.

=== 2010s ===
Influenced by modern jazz in America that uses odd meters and rhythmic and harmonic elements of Hip-hop, R&B, and Neo soul, the sound of Japanese jazz has become more musically complicated and diverse. The bands and artists that represent those new sounds includes MEGAPTERAS, Yasei Collective, Shun Ishiwaka(石若駿), Mononkul, and Takuya Kuroda. While modern jazz sound is becoming mainstream in the music scene, there are still some jazz musicians who play traditional styles of jazz such as Bebop, Hard bop, and post-bop.

In 2012, jazz pianist Ai Kuwabara, whose style is described as post-Hiromi Uehara, released her first album from here to there. Five years later, she recorded somehow, someday, somewhere, in which Ai collaborated with American jazz drummer Steve Gadd and bassist Will Lee. Shun Ishiwaka, jazz drummer and composer, has received huge recognition in Japan because of his incomparable technique and cutting-edge sound and been a part of many recordings and projects with notable musicians such as Terumasa Hino, Tokyo New City Orchestra, Taylor McFerrin, and Jason Moran. Shun released his debut album Cleanup in 2015 in which he combined elements of contemporary classical music, hip-hop, and straight ahead jazz and this album received "Album of the year new star praise" and “Jazz album of the year 2015” from Japan's two biggest jazz magazines Jazz Japan and Jazz Life respectively. In 2016, Shun had a concert with his own trio having guitarist Kurt Rosenwinkel as a guest at Blue Note Tokyo.

Ryo Fukui, a now deceased jazz pianist who, in life, struggled to achieve recognition outside of Japan, experienced a monumental rise in popularity thanks to streaming platforms like YouTube Music, Spotify, and others. His most notable work, 1976's "Scenery" is now the most widely listened Japanese Jazz album on YouTube, having accrued nearly 10 million views as of July 2020. This has led to his albums being reprinted for commercial sale, some of which even using the original studio tapes from 1976, and mastered in half speed.

== Media related to the subject ==
- Renée Cho Jazz Is My Native Language: A Portrait of Toshiko Akiyoshi, New York: Rhapsody Films, 1986.
- Kids on the Slope, with a TV anime scored by Yoko Kanno
- Blue Giant, with a film adaptation scored by Hiromi Uehara

== See also ==
- Pit Inn - a jazz club in Shinjuku, Tokyo
- Blue Note Tokyo
- Jazz kissa
