= Sugii Kōichi =

Japanese bandleader and composer (1906–1942)

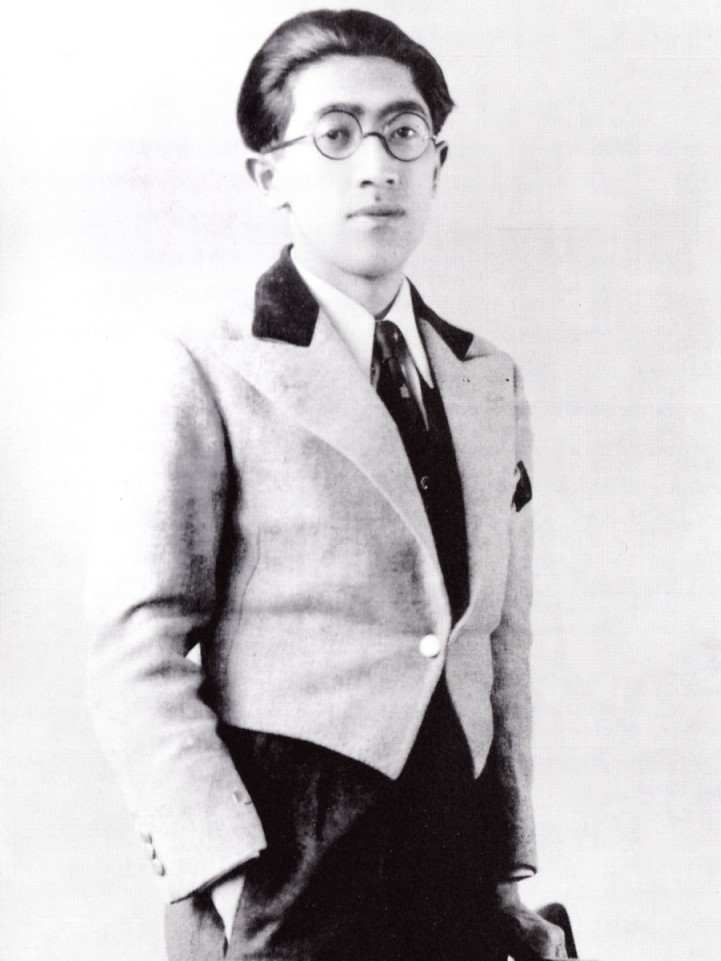

Background information
- Born: 1906; Tokyo, Japan
- Died: April 5, 1942 (aged 35–36) Nakamura Hospital, Tokyo, Japan
- Occupations: bandleader, composer, arranger, conductor, singer, accordionist, and recording artist.
- Instrument: orchestral music along with Japanese folk instruments
- Years active: 1936-1941
- Label: King Records

Sugii Kōichi (杉井幸一; 1906 - 1942) was a Japanese bandleader, composer, arranger, conductor, singer, and accordionist who was one of the pioneers of Japanese jazz. His musical arrangements skillfully bridged Eastern and Western styles, combining American orchestral jazz with Japanese pop and Chinese folk music to create a sophisticated and melodic hybrid style which one scholar has deemed, "among the most compellingly original in Japanese prewar and wartime jazz", and another scholar has called "the apex of wartime jazz" in Japan.

== Biography ==
Sugii was born in Tokyo in 1906. His mother sang traditional Japanese music while accompanying herself on the shamisen. An early familiarity with his country's native folk songs later inspired Sugii to arrange these melodies in jazz settings.

Sugii took piano lessons from a Canadian teacher, and became an ardent admirer of Western classical traditions, jazz, and film music. In 1930, after graduating from Tokyo Imperial University, he was hired by the Osaka Merchant Shipping Company, which assigned him to Buenos Aires. In Argentina, the young business executive became enamored of the tango. Convinced his true interests were in music, Sugii returned to Japan in 1934 and found work composing and recording for a film studio. In 1935, he joined Sakurai Kiyoshi's Sakurai y Su Orquesta, a Latin-influenced band which specialized in tangos.

In 1936, under contract to the King Records label, Sugii made his first recordings as a solo accordionist and singer. In 1938, as a staff arranger, he directed the "King Novelty Orchestra" in releasing the King Records "Salon Music Series," a series of orchestral recordings (30 songs on 15 records) which launched a "Salon Music" vogue in Japan. The sessions were released under a variety of names, including the King Novelty Orchestra, the King Salon Orchestra, the King Jazz Band, and the Sugii Accordion Ensemble. When Sugii and his orchestra performed on radio broadcasts, they did so under names such as "The New Order Rhythm Orchestra," reflecting the increasingly tight ideological control over radio by state authorities during this period. In addition to providing arrangements, Sugii conducted the orchestra, played accordion, bandoneon, or piano, and occasionally sang on these recordings.

Sugii's arrangements are notable for their creative combination of jazz and swing lexicon with traditional Chinese and Japanese instruments and melodic elements. Sugii employed the jazz idiom as a somewhat neutral ground upon which to interpolate exotic Japanese and Chinese elements. At a time of growing nationalism and xenophobia in Japan, Suigii sought to naturalize a uniquely "Japanese" style of jazz that could avoid censorship and suppression by the state.

Sugii performed in concert and movie theaters and on radio, and was artistically and commercially successful in his brief career. However, Sugii was hospitalized on December 8, 1941, and died on April 5, 1942, at age 36, of acute nephritis.

== Music Archives ==
The once-popular Sugii released dozens of discs between 1936 and 1941 in his native Japan, but his work has rarely been reissued. In 2011, the archival digital label Radiophone Archives compiled 51 of Sugii's recordings into a three-volume series called Japanese Jazz & Salon Music, 1936-1941, featuring most of his known orchestral and solo recordings. The tracks were remastered from original 78s, many of which are extremely rare.

== Discography ==
Year	Title	Original title	Notes
1936	Oiwake	(追分)	
1936	Chinrai-Bushi	(チンライ節)	
1937	Gypsy-Dream-Rose	(ジプシー・ドリーム・ローズ)	
1937	Tahako-Sendou-Uta	(母子船頭歌)	
1939	Kanki-No-Uta	(歓喜の歌)	
1940	When It's Lamplighting Time in The Valley	(谷間の灯ともし頃)	
1940	Tairyo-Bushi	大漁節	
1940	Kiso-Bushi	(木曾節)	
1941	Kagoshima-Ohara-Bushi	(鹿児島小原節)	
1941	Kushimoto-Bushi	(串本節)	
