= Mellow Dream =

Live album by Ryo Fukui
- Released: 1977
- Recorded: August 17 & 18, 1977
- Venues: Yamaha Hall, Sapporo, Japan
- Genre: Jazz
- Length: 42:22
- Labels: Trio Tokyo; Solid
- Producer: Masataka Itoh

Ryo Fukui chronology
Scenery (1976)	Mellow Dream (1977)	My Favorite Tune (1994)

Mellow Dream is a 1977 live album by pianist Ryo Fukui, produced by Masataka Itoh. It was recorded at Yamaha Hall in Sapporo, Japan. It was released on vinyl LP by Trio Records, Tokyo. The album features Satoshi Denpo on bass and Yoshinori Fukui on drums. The album was re-issued in 2006 as a CD release by Solid Records, featuring a bonus track, Early Summer, performed at Slow Boat, a jazz club in Sapporo owned by Ryo Fukui, which is currently run by his widow, Yasuko Fukui. The album also features three tracks with original lyrics by Fukui: "Mellow Dream", "Baron Potato Blues", and "Horizon". The album is described as "an emotional roller coaster, veering between vibrant to joyous and melancholy and rueful".

== Track listing ==
1. "Mellow Dream" (Ryo Fukui) – 9:51
2. "My Foolish Heart" (Victor Young) – 6:55
3. "Baron Potato Blues" (Ryo Fukui) – 7:05
4. "What's New" (Bob Haggart, Johnny Burke) – 5:59
5. "Horizon" (Ryo Fukui) – 9:30
6. "My Funny Valentine" (Richard Rodgers, Lorenz Hart) – 3:21
7. "Early Summer" (Hideo Ichikawa) – 8:50
