= Scenery (Ryo Fukui album) =

Studio album by Ryo Fukui
- Released: 1976
- Recorded: July 7, 1976
- Venues: Yamaha Hall, Sapporo
- Genres: Straight-ahead jazz; cool jazz
- Label: Trio
- Producers: Masataka Ito; Ryo Fukui

Ryo Fukui chronology
Scenery (1976)	Mellow Dream (1977)

Scenery (シーナリィ) is a 1976 jazz album by Japanese pianist Ryo Fukui. It was Fukui's first release.

== Reception ==
This album was virtually ignored in the United States, given that it was released at a time of reduced American interest in jazz. In the decades since Scenery's release, the album has earned greater critical praise, especially for track "Early Summer". Fukui's dexterity and self-taught style has earned him comparison to such piano greats as McCoy Tyner and Bill Evans.

== Track listing ==
Side A

1. "It Could Happen to You" (Jimmy Van Heusen, Johnny Burke)
2. "I Want to Talk About You" (Billy Eckstine)
3. "Early Summer" (Hideo Ichikawa)

Side B

1. "Willow Weep for Me" (Ann Ronell)
2. "Autumn Leaves" (Joseph Kosma, Jacques Prévert)
3. "Scenery" (Ryo Fukui)

== Personnel ==
- Ryo Fukui – piano
- Satoshi Denpo – bass
- Yoshinori Fukui – drums

== See also ==
- 1976 in jazz
- 1976 in Japanese music
