= Ryo Fukui =

Japanese jazz pianist (1948-2016)

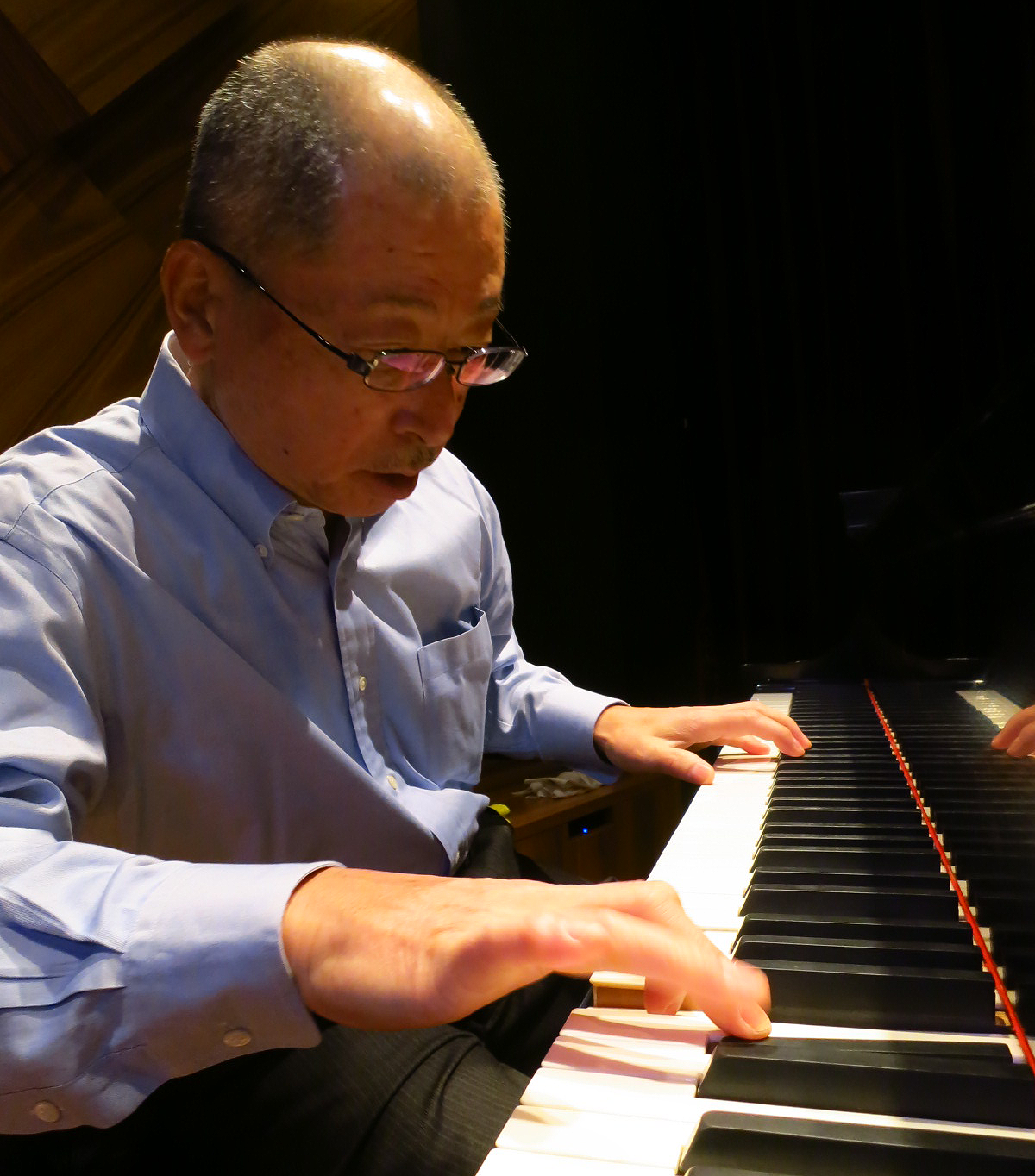
- Fukui at the piano, performing at "The Glee"

Background information
- Born: Ryo Fukui (福居良); June 1, 1948; Biratori, Hokkaido, Japan
- Died: March 15, 2016 (aged 67) Sapporo, Hokkaido, Japan
- Genre: Jazz
- Occupations: Composer; pianist
- Instrument: Piano
- Years active: 1976–2016
- Formerly of: Hidehiko Matsumoto, Barry Harris, Leroy Williams, Lyle Atkinson, Satoshi Denpo

Ryo Fukui (福居良, Fukui Ryō; [ɸɯ.kɯꜜi ɾʲoː]; June 1, 1948 – March 15, 2016) was a Japanese jazz pianist based in Sapporo. He played regularly at the "Slowboat" jazz club in Sapporo, which he and his wife Yasuko owned. Fukui taught and performed internationally until his death in 2016. His work has seen a spike in popularity after his death, with several reissues of his albums.

== Early life and career ==
=== 1966–1980s ===
Fukui began his life in music by learning the accordion at age 18. At the age of 22, he began to teach himself piano and soon moved to Tokyo. Fukui met occasionally with saxophonist Hidehiko Matsumoto, who offered valuable encouragement and guidance to the aspiring pianist. Nonetheless, Fukui was often disheartened, feeling as though he was not making significant improvement in his playing.

In 1976, six years after moving to Tokyo, Fukui released his first album, Scenery, and his second album, Mellow Dream, the year after. He continued improving his skills over the following years in live performance, often appearing in a trio that also included Satoshi Denpo and Yoshinori Fukui (Ryo's brother). The trio would often play at the Shinjuku Pit Inn, Kichijōji Sometime jazz club, and the Jazz Inn Lovely in Nagoya. Fukui also began to perform overseas in France and America as well as beginning to teach jazz piano to students internationally.

=== 1990s–2015 ===
Fukui and Barry Harris

In 1992, during his visit to America, Fukui met Barry Harris, an American jazz pianist from Detroit. The two went on to become close friends, with Harris becoming a mentor figure to Fukui and helping him develop his technique in bebop. In 1994, a third album, My Favourite Tune, was recorded and released featuring Fukui on solo piano playing several original works as well as renditions of songs such as "My Conception" by Sonny Clark and "After Hours" by Avery Parrish. This album was followed by In New York four years later, in trio with the drummer Leroy Williams and the bassist Lisle Arthur Atkinson. In 1995, Fukui went on to open the Slowboat jazz club, which attracted many local jazz players as well as international. He would also go on to offer lessons and workshops to pass on his knowledge of music to others. Fukui's final album, A Letter From Slowboat, was released in 2015, recorded live during his time at the Slowboat jazz club.

== Death and legacy ==
Fukui died on March 15, 2016, of lymphoma. After his death, his widow Yasuko Fukui took over the Slowboat jazz club, running its day-to-day operations. Fukui's longtime friend Barry Harris began performing his song "Fukai Aijo" (深い愛情) and dedicating his performances to Fukui until Harris's own death in 2021.

=== Online presence ===
Japanese jazz experienced a resurgence in popularity in the late 2010s, with Fukui and especially his album Scenery being at the forefront of renewed interest. Fukui's music has made its way into popular internet culture, as much of his work has been uploaded onto streaming platforms such as YouTube and Apple Music. This resurgence in Fukui's work has cultivated a large audience of collectors seeking the vinyl releases of his work.

=== Accolades ===
Fukui received the Sapporo Culture Encouragement Prize in 2012.

== Discography ==
=== Studio albums ===
- Scenery (1976)
- Mellow Dream (1977)

=== Live albums ===
- My Favorite Tune (1994)
- Ryo Fukui in New York (1999)
- A Letter from Slowboat (with Takumi Awaya on bass and Ittetsu Takemura on drums, 2015)
- Live at Vidro '77 (2021)
- Ryo Fukui Trio at the Slowboat 2004 (2025)

=== Compilation ===
- Scenery Of Japanese Jazz: Best Of Ryo Fukui (2022)
