= Meikyoku kissa =

Japanese classical music cafe

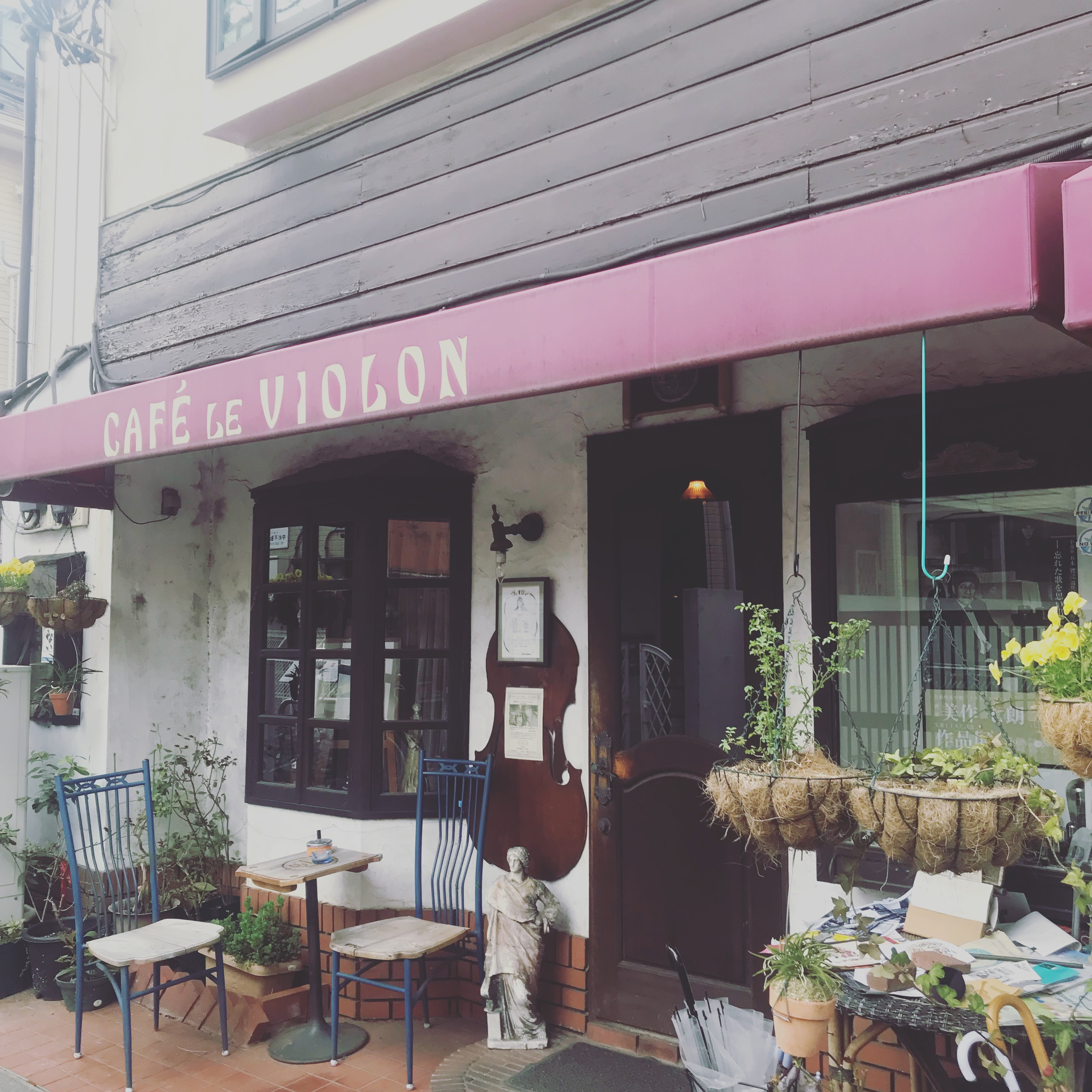
Café Le Violon, a meikyouku kissa in Asagaya, Tokyo

Meikyoku kissa (名曲喫茶; literally "masterpiece teahouse"), is a Japanese term for a café at which customers can listen to classical music while they are drinking coffee and other beverages. People can request their favourite music at many locations.

Meikyoku kissa first appeared during the 1950s. Most people could not buy expensive LP records, so they listened to classical music at the cafés.

Since the late 20th century, the number of meikyoku kissa has been in decline.

== See also ==
- Internet café
- Jazz kissa
- Manga kissa
