= Jazz kissa =

Japanese jazz cafés

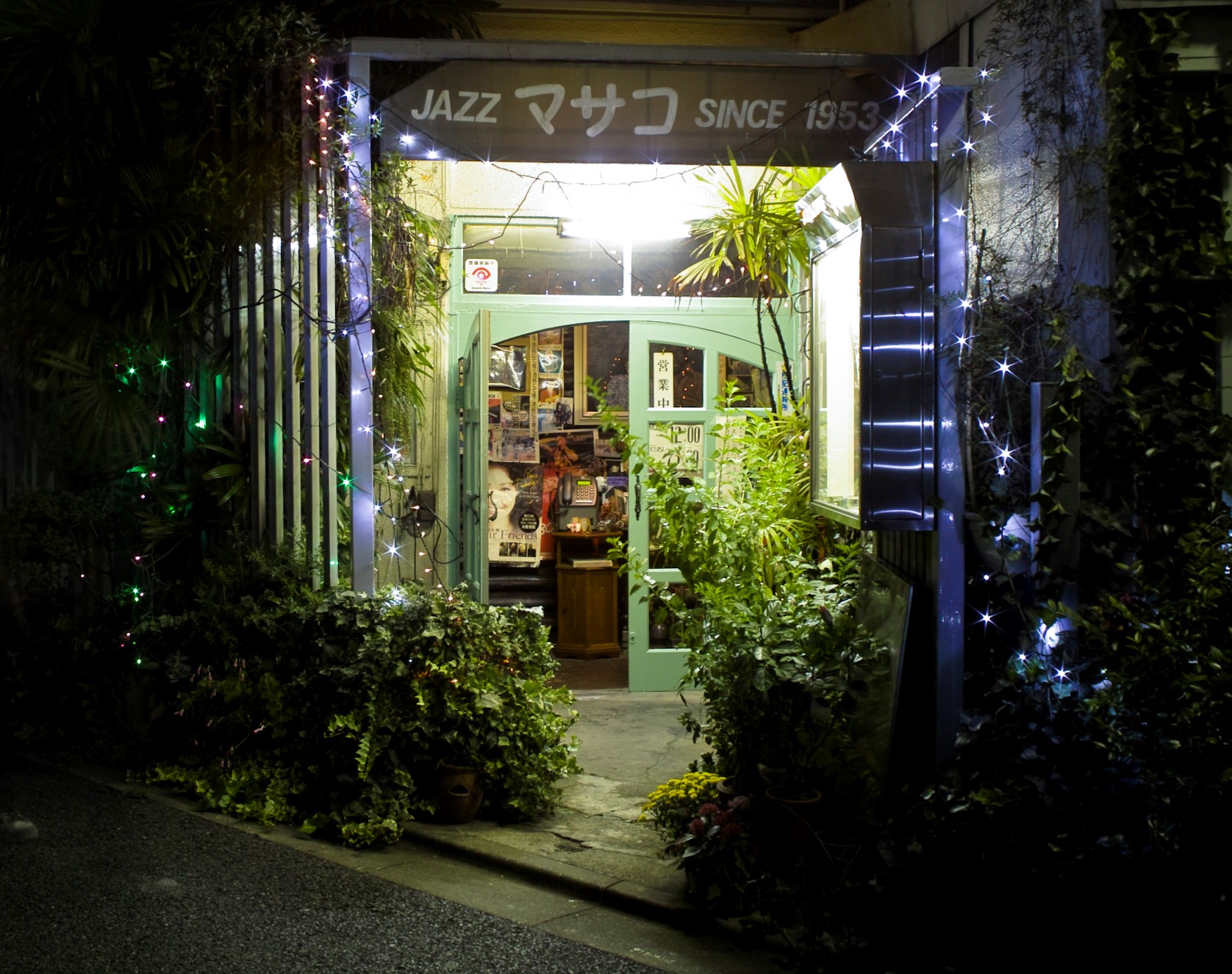
Entrance of a jazz kissa in Shimokitazawa, Tokyo

Jazz kissa (Japanese: ジャズ喫茶), sometimes transliterated as jazu kissa, are cafés that specialise in the playing and appreciation of recorded jazz music. Unique to Japan, jazz kissa are spaces where jazz music is played for dedicated listening rather than as background music. A typical jazz kissa features a high-quality stereo system, a large music collection and dim lighting, and serves coffee and alcoholic drinks.

The first cafés focused on playing recorded jazz opened in Japan in the late 1920s as part of a wider enthusiasm for Western culture and music. Before World War II there were about 80 jazz kissa, but during the war many of them closed. The post-war period saw jazz kissa return in even greater numbers. Jazz kissa served as places to hear imported jazz records that were too expensive for individuals to buy. They were an important musical resource for musicians, journalists and jazz enthusiasts, and, at their peak, there were around 600 jazz kissa operating across Japan.

Starting in the 1970s, easier and cheaper access to personal stereo equipment and jazz music challenged the role of the jazz kissa. Jazz kissa numbers greatly reduced and the remaining kissa were mainly visited for nostalgic reasons. However, jazz kissa continue to operate in Japan and new kissa are still being opened. Jazz kissa played a role in the reception of jazz music and modern Western culture in Japan. Their influence extends beyond Japan with listening bars inspired by jazz kissa opening in many other countries in the 21st century.

== History ==
=== Pre-war beginnings ===
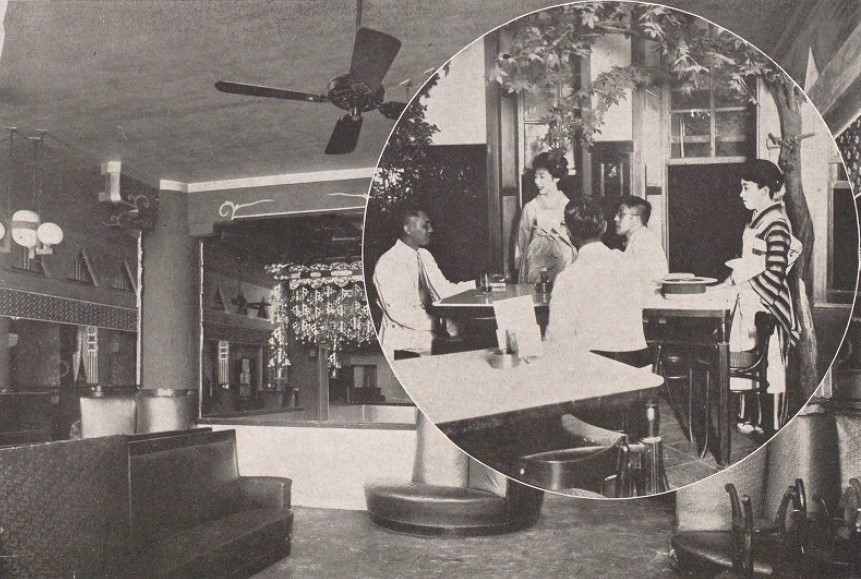
A Ginza café in 1930

The popularisation of coffee, cafés and jazz music in Japan began in the 1920s and 1930s as part of a wider middle-class enthusiasm for Western ideas. It was common for cafés to play music from phonographs. Some cafés employed waitresses who offered sexual services and would sing and dance to the phonograph. The loud music also disguised private conversations between patrons and waitresses. Other cafés eschewed this eroticism and installed phonographs, low lighting and sofas to create a sophisticated and relaxed atmosphere.

The first music cafés, called ongaku kissa (a shortening of kissaten), opened in Japan in the late 1920s. Due to restrictions on live music, kissa were some of the only places outside of large venues where people could hear Western music. These kissa housed large record collections, centred on specific genres, and modern sound equipment. The interior and exterior of kissa were decorated in elegant and sometimes eccentric Western styles. Classical music cafés, named meikyoku kissa, were popular as well as those playing jazz and Latin music. These were also staffed by female waitresses and catered to young patrons, often men who could not afford to purchase the music themselves. Kissa were usually operated by music enthusiasts rather than businesspeople seeking to make money.

It is likely that the first kissa to specialise solely in jazz music opened in 1929. The jazz kissa of this period, and their extensive record collections, served as an important resource for record collectors, musicians and even jazz journalists. There were eventually around eighty jazz kissa in Japan with the majority in Tokyo. During World War II, however, these establishments were shuttered. Many of the jazz kissa had their record collections destroyed in Allied air raids, and most jazz kissa that emerged following the war had little relationship with these pre-war jazz kissa.

=== Post-war re-emergence ===
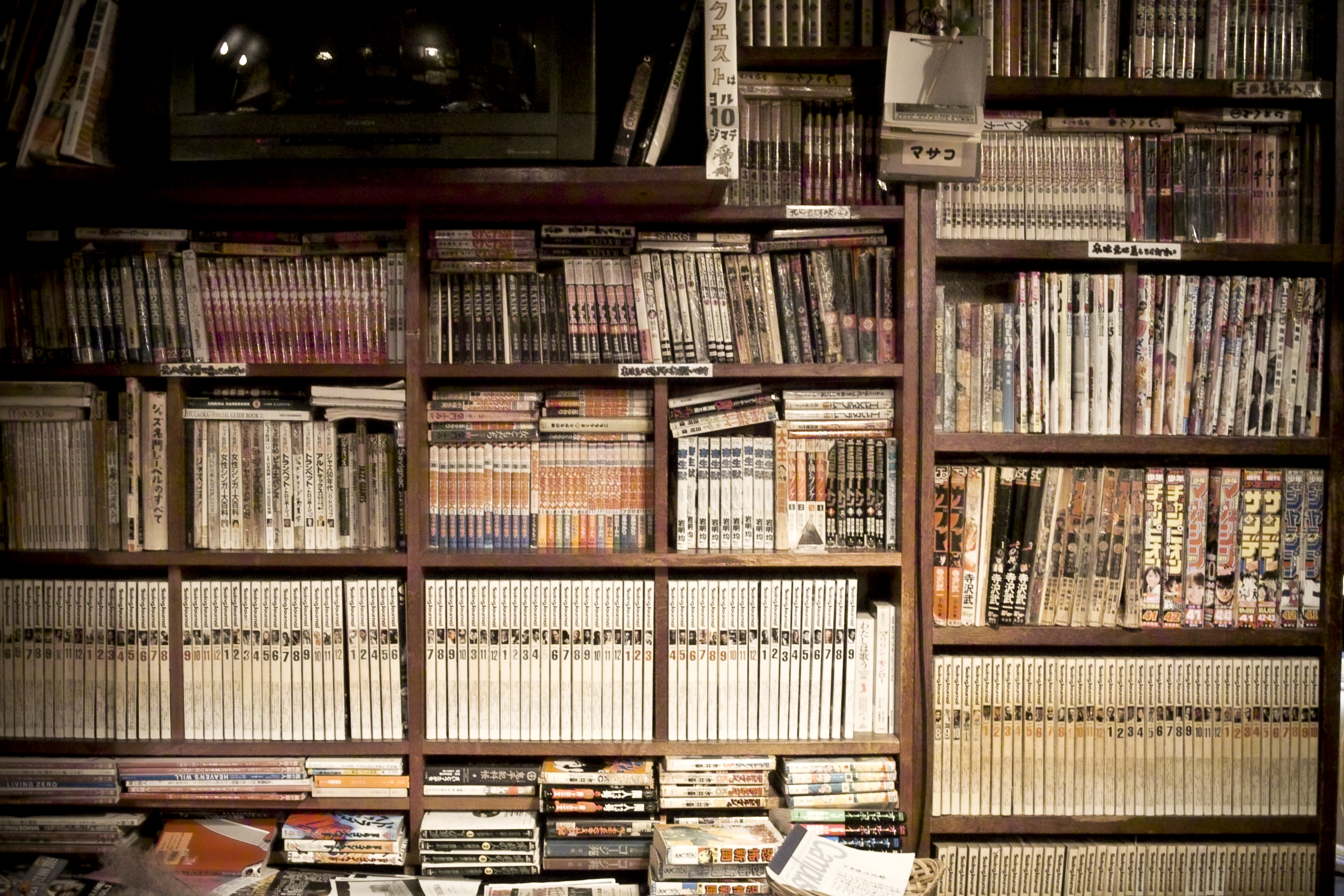
A jazz kissa's book collection containing copies of Swing Journal

In 1950s Japan, live jazz performances were rare as were locally produced jazz records. Instead, records had to be imported from America at prohibitively expensive prices that, while too costly for most individuals, jazz kissa would pay. This resulted in jazz kissa, alongside radio, becoming some of the only places to hear the latest jazz music. Jazz kissa served an educational role for jazz fans and musicians, including Toshiko Akiyoshi and Sadao Watanabe. The kissa's proprietor would give in-depth introductions to records before playing them, and some patrons would take notes. Japanese publication Swing Journal published introductions for records to be used in jazz kissa. In contrast to pre-war jazz kissa, these establishments were simply furnished and usually only sold drinks. Most Japanese cities hosted jazz kissa by the end of the 1950s. Jazz kissa would often cater to specific niches, just playing music from a specific sub-genre.

The difficulty for individuals to purchase jazz music continued in the 1960s. This particularly affected university students who, drawn to the cafes' bohemian atmosphere, made up a significant proportion of jazz kissa patrons. (Note: A 1967 survey showed that students made up 42 per cent of the 1500 jazz kissa customers interviewed.) However, there was an increase in live music venues where jazz could be heard. Some jazz kissa in the 1950s had hosted live music, but this petered out in the 1960s. A new type of jazz kissa emerged in the middle of the decade. These jazz kissa were notable for their dim lighting, extremely loud music and rules for patrons such as the prohibition of talking. This style of jazz appreciation was tied to free jazz and the New Left student movement. Jazz kissa would even host political meetings and talks arranged by students. However, this trend declined at the end of the 1960s alongside the deaths of free jazz musicians John Coltrane and Albert Ayler and the disintegration of the New Left.

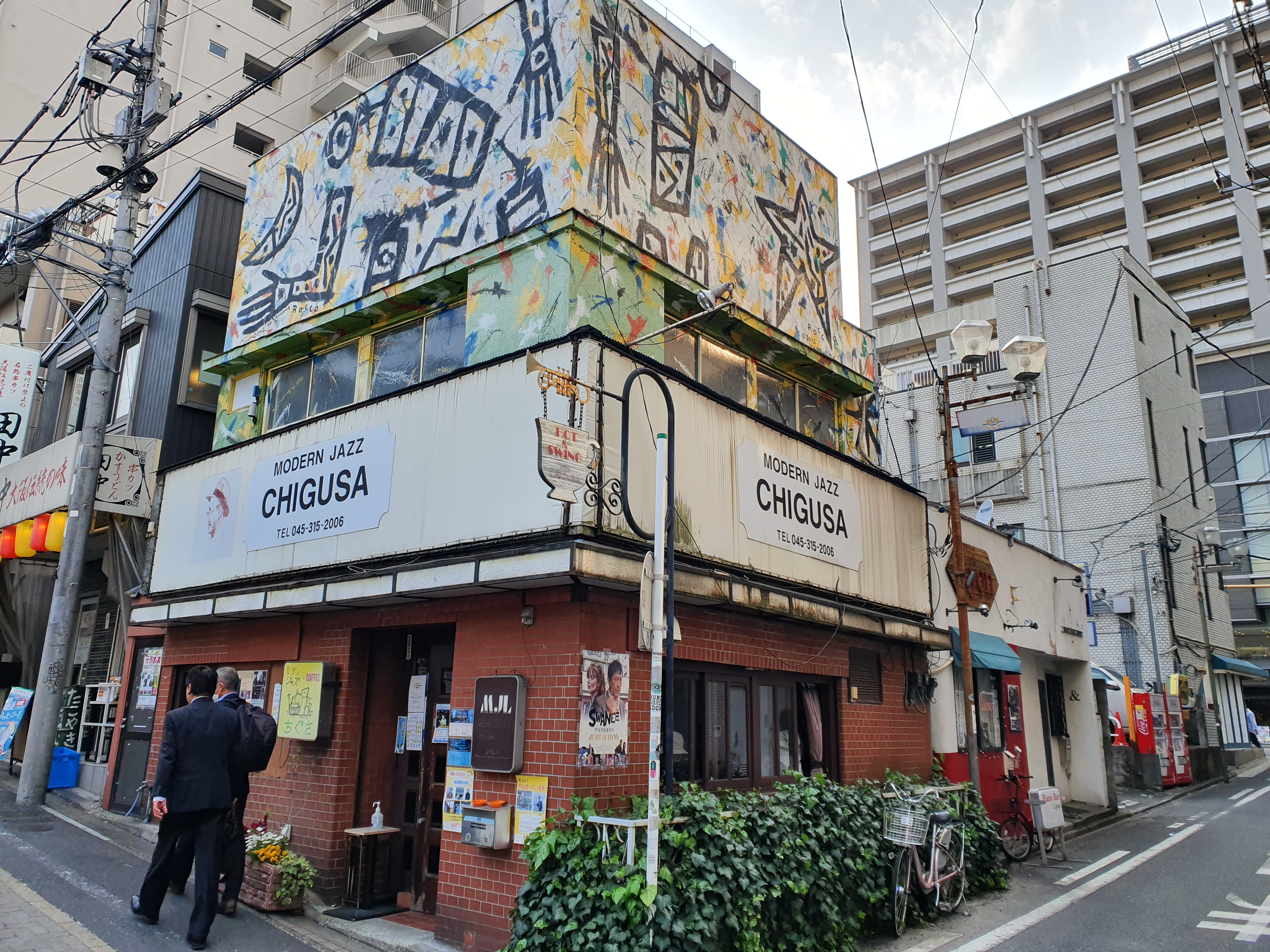
Chigusa in Yokohama, which was one of Japan's oldest jazz kissa when it closed in 2022

At their height in the mid-1970s, there were around 600 jazz kissa operating in Japan. Societal changes over subsequent decades led to a steady reduction in jazz kissa numbers. Records and stereos became affordable for teenagers and students in the 1970s which, together with a considerable expansion in live jazz, made the music readily more accessible. The popularisation of jazz fusion forced jazz kissa to adapt to the new music, which some jazz fans found objectionable, or see their customer-base diminish. Aside from the change of music, cafés reduced the volume of the music, allowed patrons to talk, sold alcohol and lightened their décor. There was again a leap in access to personal audio equipment in the 1980s with the CD quickly replacing vinyl. Live jazz became widespread across Japan, and jazz was frequently the background music in hospitality venues. These developments negatively affected jazz kissa. One benefit to these changes was that jazz kissa became some of the few remaining places to hear jazz from original vinyl records. Customers continued visiting them as a reminder of the past or to feel they were "authentically" experiencing jazz music.

=== Contemporary jazz kissa ===
Jazz kissa are now greatly reduced in number from their 20th century peak. The remaining kissa are largely the same as they were in the immediate post-war period. Music is mainly played from vinyl records and features most jazz sub-genres. However, new jazz kissa continued to be opened. These jazz kissa have targeted younger customers by creating a more relaxed environment and featuring live performances from both DJs and musicians.

== Characteristics and etiquette ==
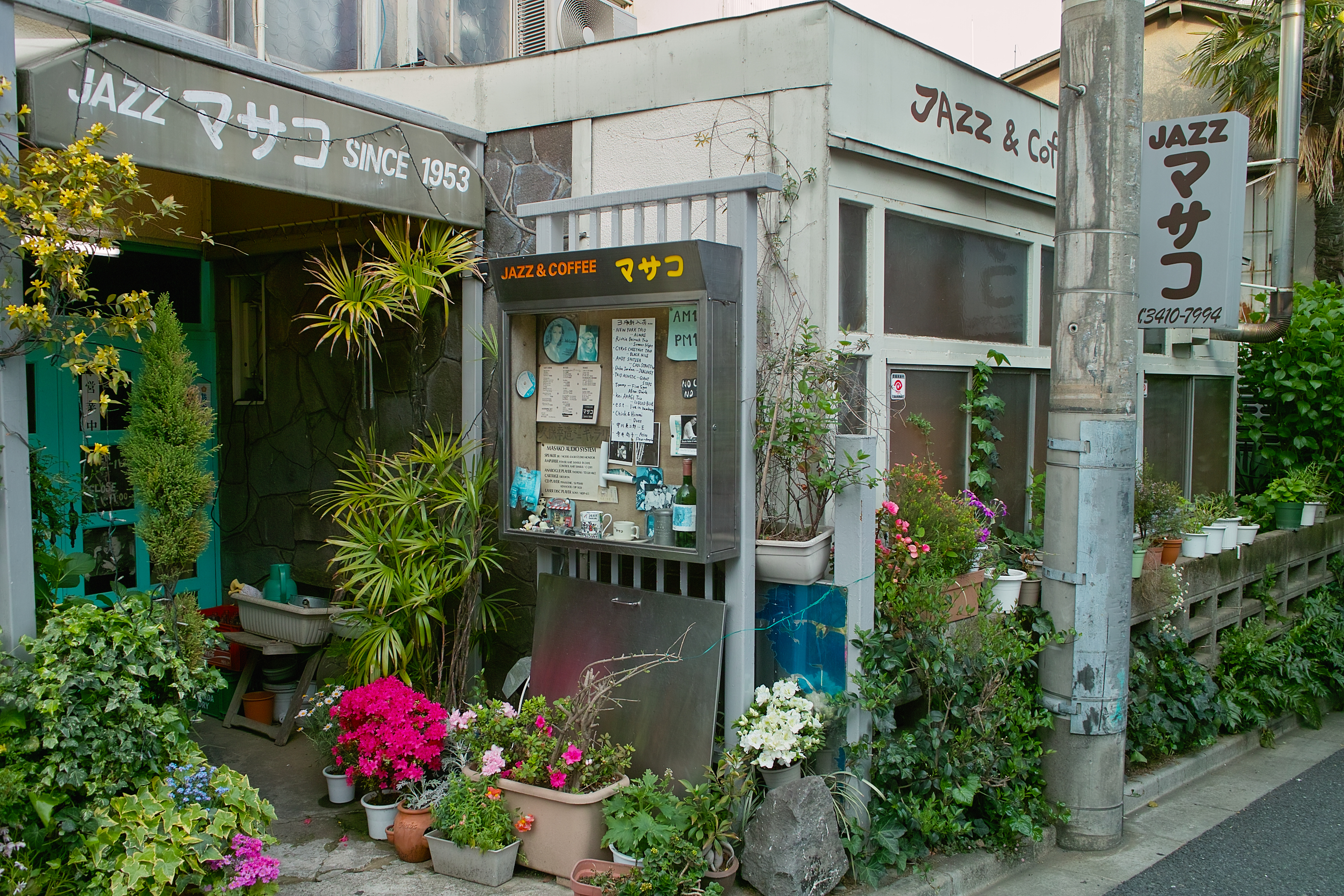
Jazz kissa exterior

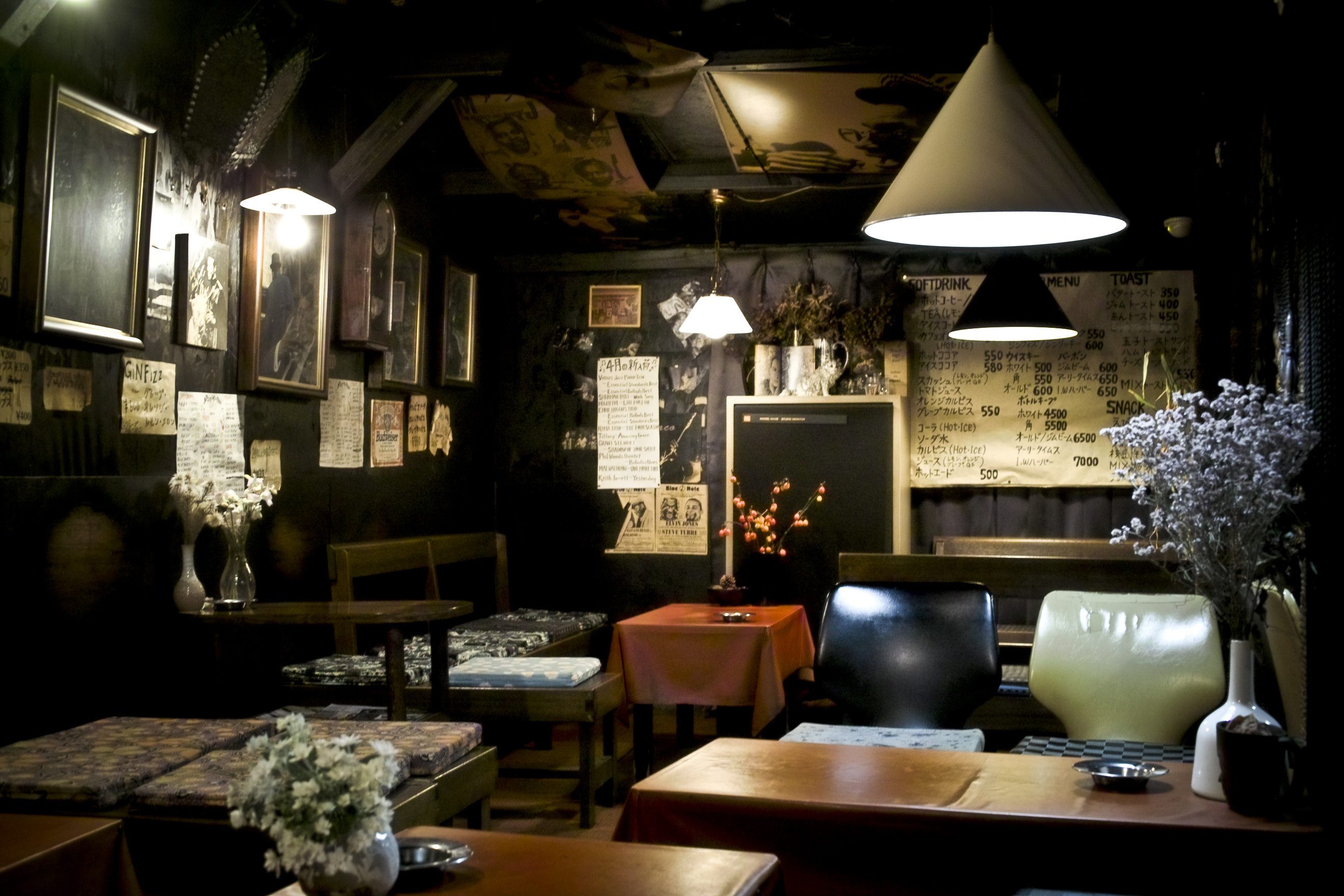
Jazz kissa interior

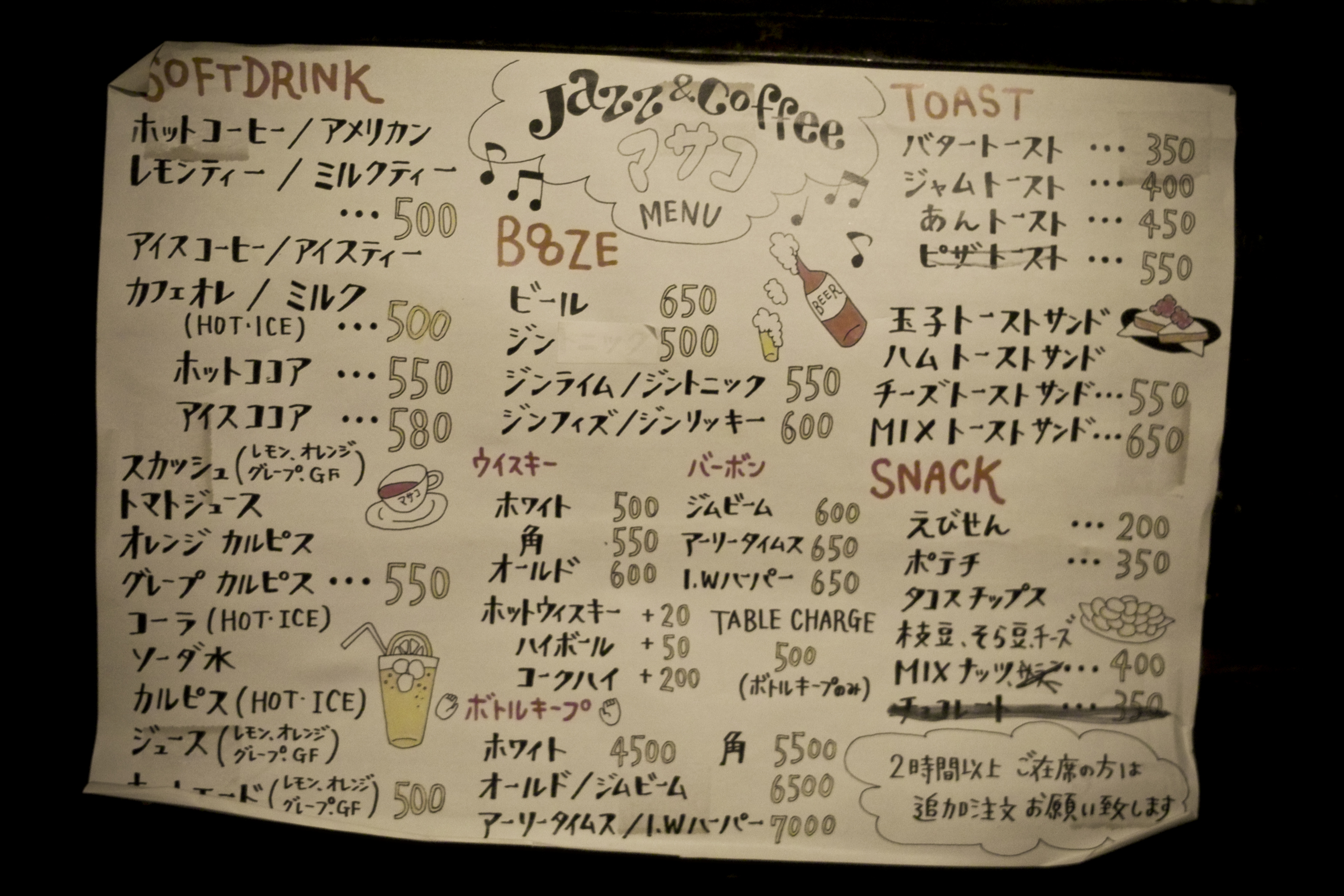
Jazz kissa menu

Music in jazz kissa is generally selected from the establishment's large music collection and played loudly on a sophisticated sound system. High-quality stereo equipment is a central feature of jazz kissa and speakers are sometimes custom built for the space. The music is intended for patrons' dedicated musical appreciation rather than as background music or to facilitate dancing. Often one side of a record is played through in full before changing the music.

Typically jazz kissa have low lighting and antique furniture, and are located on quiet side streets. The walls of many jazz kissa are decorated with LP covers and have shelves filled with vinyl records and CDs. Japanese musician Otomo Yoshihide wrote that the classic jazz kissa of the 1970s was a 15 m^{2} room with a counter, several hundred vinyl LPs, a large collection of magazines and "a pair of huge JBL or Altec speakers".

Jazz kissa are overseen by a master (マスター, masutā), who is usually an owner-operator and the only staff member. The master will serve customers drinks and food as well as curate the kissa's music. The choice of music is entirely managed by the master and suggestions from patrons are uncommon with the exception of recommendations from regular customers. Masters are reputed for their expert knowledge of jazz music and are often relied on as fact-checkers for jazz critics and writers.

Jazz kissa are known for enforcing rules on their patrons. Establishments may request patrons listen to music in silence and are not places for socialising. Coffee and alcohol are served to customers. Drink costs are often higher than other venues to ensure financial viability from a small number of customers, and customers may stay for as much time as they please. Customers visit alone or in pairs and never in larger groups.

== Impact ==
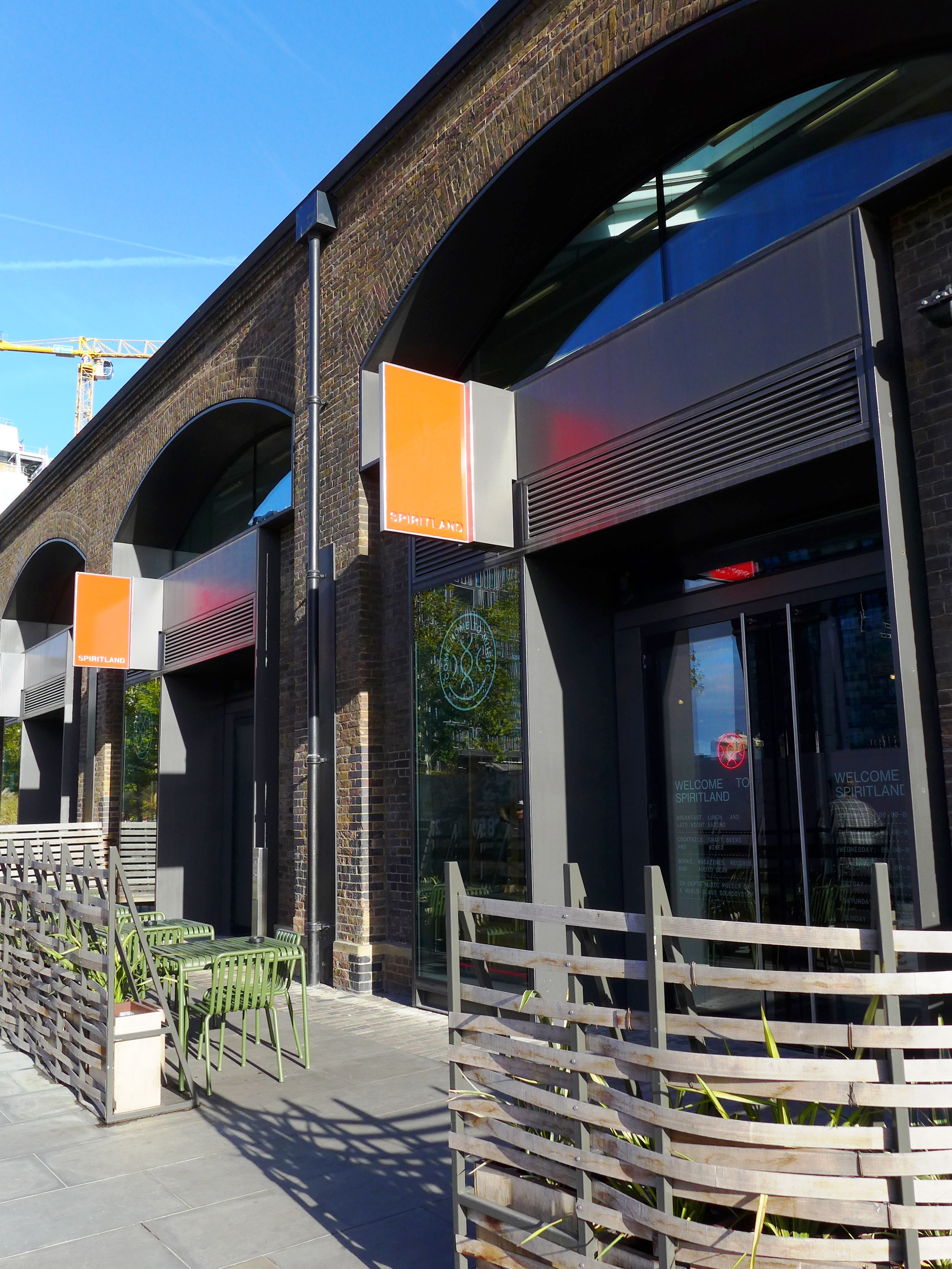
A listening bar in London, England

Jazz kissa led Japan to an appreciation of jazz music as a high art form similar to classical music. Musicologist David Novak has argued that the imported technology and music in jazz kissa "helped Japanese learn how to be modern". According to Novak, in the 1970s and 80s venues emerged which were focused on experimental music. These kissa and venue were both a product of and a reaction against the culture of jazz kissa and played an important role in Japanoise music. Similarly, the concentrated yet communal way Japanese audiences listen to experimental Onkyokei music may have emerged from the listening practices of jazz kissa.

The jazz kissa is a uniquely Japanese phenomenon that has no equivalent globally. However, in the 21st century, listening bars, influenced by Japanese jazz kissa, have begun to be opened outside of Japan. The Japan News reported that at least 50 establishments inspired by jazz kissa have opened in Western and Asian countries.

== See also ==
- Japanese jazz
- Jazz club, venue for the performance of live jazz music
- Coffee in Japan

== Further information ==
- Tetsuya Hoshino (2020). ジャズ喫茶ベイシー Swiftyの譚詩（Ballad） [Jazz Café Basie: The Ballad of Swifty] (Motion picture) (in Japanese).
