= Hatano Jazz Band =

Japanese band

Hatano Jazz Band (Japanese: Hatano Orchestra ハタノ・オーケストラ) was a Japanese band founded by graduates from Tokyo Music School in 1912. The leader of the band was Fukutarō Hatano who went on to become a songwriter. Although some described it as the first Japanese jazz band, Hatano himself stated that he had "never had much to do with jazz". Hatano (cornet and violin) co-founded the band with a cellist, banjoist, accordionist and drummer, and it played aboard the trans-Pacific ship, the Chiyo Maru. On stopovers in San Francisco, the musicians were exposed to different forms of music, which they took back to Japan. "Within five years the Hatano orchestra had 12 members, mostly string players." Hatano recalled the dance music they played in Japan in 1921: "we played fox trot, one-step, and two-step scores, which I'd bought in America, as they were. Nobody knew anything about ad-libbing yet".

== History ==
- 1912: The band performed on the Chiyo Maru steamship from Yokohama to San Francisco.
- 1915: They played accompaniments to silent films.
- 1918: The band became popular and played during film intermissions.
- 1922: Fukutarō Hatano organized a larger orchestra.
