= Indigo Jam Unit =

indigo jam unit
- Origin: Osaka, Japan
- Genres: Jazz, Nu jazz
- Years active: 2005–2016
- Label: Basis
- Members: Yoshichika Tarue; Katsuhiko Sasai; Isao Wasano; Takehiro Shimizu
- Website: www.basisrecords.com/indigo/

Indigo Jam Unit (stylised as indigo jam unit) was a Japanese jazz band formed in Osaka, Japan in 2005.

== Members ==
- Yoshichika Tarue (樽栄嘉哉), born July 9, 1974 - piano
- Katsuhiko Sasai (笹井克彦), born December 6, 1976 - double bass
- Isao Wasano (和佐野功), born September 25, 1979 - percussion, drums
- Takehiro Shimizu (清水勇博), born March 27, 1983 - drums

== History ==
Indigo Jam Unit, a quartet, originated out of a trio consisting of Yoshichika Tarue (piano), Katsuhiko Sasai (double bass), and Isao Wasano (percussion and drums). In 2005, the trio had been playing live and working with different member setups when they started working with independent record label producer Kenichi Tateiwa of Basis Records, who suggested they add Takehiro Shimizu on drums to the line up. Shimizu joined the band in the months leading up to the recording of their first album, DEMONSTRATION, in August 2005. Shimizu currently (November, 2011) divides his time between Osaka, Japan, and New York City.

Indigo Jam Unit is often grouped together with other bands from the Japanese jazz and nu jazz scene, such as Quasimode, Soil & "Pimp" Sessions, and Sleepwalker among others. Indigo Jam Unit have distinguished themselves with a twin drum line up where Shimizu contributes the jazzier rhythms and drum solos while Wasano adds a heavier straight beat and percussion.

Indigo Jam Unit always record their material live in the studio with little post processing and as few effects as possible. No edits or overdubs are made to their recordings. The only exception is their 2009 release re:common on Rambling Records, featuring American hip-hop artist Common and hip-hop/soul artist Mary J. Blige's original voice tracks with indigo jam unit's instrumental tracks added separately.

Indigo Jam Unit have recorded and performed together with Japanese jazz vocalist Karen Aoki (SUMMERTIME feat. Indigo Jam Unit, 2008), label mates Flexlife (Vintage Black, 2009), and Trinidadian vocalist Alicia Saldenha (ROSE, 2011).

In September–October 2009 Indigo Jam Unit were featured in Tower Record's No Music, No Life poster series in Japan. The poster was shared with DJ Tatsuo Sunaga.

On November 1, 2015, indigo jam unit announced that they will disband in summer of 2016.

== Discography ==
=== Studio albums (original material) ===
- 2006: DEMONSTRATION
- 2006: 2x2
- 2007: REALism
- 2008: Pirates
- 2009: Collectivity
- 2010: Roots
- 2011: INDEPENDENT
- 2012: REBEL
- 2013: Milestone
- 2014: indigo jam unit
- 2015: Lights

=== Studio albums (remastered material) ===
- 2011: DEMONSTRATION - Remaster - Re-issue with two additional tracks on SHM-CD.
- 2014: REALism - Remaster - Re-issue in the Japanese SHM-CD format.
- 2015: 2x2 - Remaster - Re-issue in the Japanese SHM-CD format.

=== Studio albums (cover songs/remixes) ===
- 2009: Vintage Black - Cover album with Flexlife
- 2009: re:common - Cover/re-mix album
- 2011: ROSE - Cover album featuring Alicia Saldenha
- 2013: impression - Cover album. Japan only release

=== Studio albums (live shows) ===
- 2016: DECADE - Performance at "BillboardLive" commemorating 10 years since DEMONSTRATION's release
- 2016: ReWIND
- 2016: Final Live Tour - Final Live performance, taking place at "ROOMS"
- 2016: JUST MUSIC. final five days
