= The Lutheran Hall =

- ザ・ルーテルホール
- Interactive map of The Lutheran Hall
- Address: 3-1 Odori Nishi 6-chome, Chūō-ku; Sapporo, Hokkaido; Japan
- Coordinates: 43.0592°N 141.3485°E
- Owner: Japan Lutheran Church (Sapporo Lutheran Center)
- Capacity: 216

Construction
- Opened: 1986

Website
- https://www.lutheranhall.com/

The Lutheran Hall (Japanese: ザ・ルーテルホール) is a concert hall located in Chūō-ku, Sapporo, Hokkaido, Japan. The venue, housed in the Sapporo Lutheran Center building, has a fixed seating capacity of 216 and was opened in 1986. The hall is primarily used for chamber music, solo recitals, music school and student recitals, and other small- to mid-scale classical-music events.

== Overview ==
The Lutheran Hall is located near Odori in central Sapporo, accessible by subway or tram. The hall's timber interior, sloped fixed seating, and a rounded stage (approximately 12 m wide by 7.5 m deep) contribute to its acoustics. The hall is suited to chamber music, solo recitals, student recitals, recordings, and piano duos (the hall is equipped with two Hamburg-Steinway full grand pianos).

The hall also includes a rehearsal room with a grand piano, and rentable rooms for meetings or lectures. The venue is used for recitals, chamber concerts, music school events, and occasional recordings or smaller-scale cultural events.

== Facilities ==
- Fixed seating: 216 seats.
- Stage: rounded design, approx. 12 m (width) × 7.5 m (depth).
- Two Hamburg-Steinway grand pianos (supports piano duos).
- Rehearsal room with grand piano, and rentable meeting/lecture rooms.
