= Mononkul =

Japanese songwriting duo

- Born: Japan
- Genres: J-Pop
- Years active: 2011–present
- Label: gr8!records (2019–present)
- Members: Sara Yoshida (Vocals); Ryuta Tsunoda (Bass)
- Website: https://mononkvl.tumblr.com

Mononkul is a Japanese songwriting duo consisting of Sara Yoshida and Ryuta Tsunoda. The duo belongs to gr8!records.

== Members ==
- Sara Yoshida - Vocal, lyrics, composition and arrangement
- Ryuta Tsunoda - Bass, lyrics, composition and arrangement - singer, drummer Tsunoda ☆ Hiro is his uncle.

== Overview ==
Formed in 2011 by Yoshida and Tsunoda, who were active as jazz musicians. After releasing the 1st mini-album as an indie, Kikuchi Naruyoshi produced. Released 4th album with self-produced at the beginning of 2018.

The band's name was pinned by Tsunoda, who heard that there was a magazine called "Monkuru" supervised by Juzo Itami, and liked the sound of the word rather than the meaning of the word itself. Itami's "Mononkuru" itself seems to have come from "Mon Oncle (My uncle)" because there is also a work with the same name.

== Provenance ==
- 2011
  - Released mini-album "SARA"
  - Formation of Monkuru in January
- year 2012
  - First solo performance held at MotionBlueYokohama
- 2013
  - 1st album "Flying Things, Crawling Things, Singing Things"
  - Solo performance from record held at Aoyama CAY
  - Appeared at JAZZ AUDITORIA 2013 sponsored by BlueNote Japan
- 2014
  - 2nd album "Minami e" released
  - Jazz Japan Disc Award '14 Rookie of the Year Award
  - 2nd Season Tour held
- 2015
  - FUJI ROCK FESTIVAL '15 Appearance
  - Solo performance from record held at Kinema Club
  - TOUR held to the south
  - Appeared in Earth Garden '15 Fall
  - JAZZ SUMMIT TOKYO SUMMER FESTIVAL Appearance
- 2016
  - Solo performance held at Marunouchi COTTON CLUB
  - SUNNYSIDE TOUR 2016 held
  - Appearance at KAWASAKI JAZZ 2016
- 2017
  - Solo performance held at Daikanyama UNIT
  - Held a tour where you can hear the world only here
  - 3rdAlbum "Tell me that the world is only here" is jazz on various distribution charts such as iTunes, Apple Music, Spotify Won 1st place in the category
  - Kikuchi Naruyoshi Directed work "Tell me it's only here" MV released
  - Distribution limited single "Mahou ga Toketara" distribution start
- 2018
  - Produced album "RELOADING CITY" released
  - Succeeded in a one-man live from a record at Ebisu Liquid Room and a solo performance at BLUE NOTE TOKYO.
- 2019
  - Digital release of "Super Looper", the image song for craft beer "Wednesday Neko"
  - Her self-planned event "Mon Japonismo" was held at Shibuya WWW with Emi Nakamura as guest for the first time and tofubeats for the second time.
- 2020
  - On July 8, a non-audience live “J-WAVE Sponsored Monkuru LIVE FROM NIHONMONO LOUNGE” will be held.
  - Citizen's cross-sea commercial song "Every One Minute" was released digitally, and the notation was changed to katakana.
- 2021
  - "Billboard Live Tokyo Performance" on March 12, "Billboard Live Yokohama Performance" on June 27, and "Billboard Live Osaka Performance" on July 16.
  - On March 3, digital release of "Hold On Me!" (Morning Musume. cover).
  - Digital release of "GOODBYE" on May 19.
  - On June 23, digital release of "Oto no Narumaida".
  - Digital release of "Zuruiyo" on August 4.
- 2022
  - January 15 Digital release of the ending theme "salvation Anime ver."
  - "salvation" CD release on February 23.
  - On March 10, a one-man live "Mononcle "salvation" RELEASE PARTY" was held at WWW X in Shibuya.
  - On May 11, Sony Xperia 1IV commercial song "Higher" was released digitally.

== Discography ==
=== Album ===
	release date	title	Catalog number	form	label	Label (LP)	source
1st	May 22, 2013	Those who fly, those who crawl, those who sing	AP1049	Delivery / CD	AIR PLANE		
2nd	October 8, 2014	to the south		Delivery / CD	TABOO		
3rd	July 12, 2017 Say well that the world is only here		Distribution / SACD Hybrid / LP	TABOO	HMV record shop		
4th	September 5, 2018	RELOADING CITY		Distribution / CD / LP	VILLAGE MUSIC	Lawson Entertainment, Inc. (HMV record shop)	

=== Singles ===
	release date	title	label	remarks	source
1st	December 6, 2017	If the magic melts away			
2nd	July 18, 2018	Shower			
	July 20, 2019	Super Looper	Sony Music Entertainment (Japan) Inc.		
	October 7, 2020	Every One Minute	Sony Music Labels Inc.		
	March 3, 2021	HOLD ON ME!	Sony Music Labels Inc.	Morning Musume. cover	
	May 19, 2021	GOODBYE	Sony Music Labels Inc.		
	June 23, 2021	While the sound rings	Sony Music Labels Inc.		
	August 4, 2021	It's cunning	Sony Music Labels Inc.		
	January 15, 2022	salvation Anime ver.	Sony Music Labels Inc.		
