= The Golden History =

- Cover of the regular edition

Single by Momoiro Clover Z
- A-side: "The Golden History"
- B-side: "Decoration"; "Noruka Soruka" (regular ed.); "Hanabi" (limited ed.)
- Released: September 7, 2016
- Genre: J-pop and Rock
- Length: 5:03
- Label: Evil Line / King

Momoiro Clover Z singles chronology
"„Z“ no Chikai" (2015)	"The Golden History" (2016)	"BLAST!" (2017)

Music video
- "The Golden History" "Decoration" on YouTube

Professional ratings
Review scores
Source	Rating
Billboard Japan	Favorable

"The Golden History" (ザ・ゴールデン・ヒストリー) is the 16th major-label single by the Japanese girl idol group Momoiro Clover Z. It was released in Japan on September 7, 2016.

== Release ==
It was the only single Momoiro Clover Z put out in 2016.

The music video for the title track was uploaded on Momoiro Clover Z's official YouTube channel on September 2, 2016 (JST). The CD single was released on September 7 in three versions: limited edition A (CD+Blu-ray), limited edition B (CD+Blu-ray), and a regular edition (CD only). The Blu-ray discs included with the limited editions contained music videos. The CD track listing of the limited edition A differed from that of the other two editions.

== Reception ==
According to Oricon, the single sold 51,883 physical (CD) copies in its first week of release in Japan. It debuted at number 2 in the weekly Oricon singles chart.

== Critical response ==
Billboard Japan's Yuki Sugioka gave a favorable review, noting that after two masterpiece albums ("Amaranthus" and "Hakkin no Yoake"), simultaneously released by the band in February, she was very much looking forward to what kind of sound would the new songs have and was prepared for another great song. She called the title song a "super positive uplifting tune" that makes you smile during the whole time it plays, from the very beginning when Kanako Momota says "Let's get started" through the rising dust. The biggest highlight of the song for her was when Kanako Momota sang her solo part before the final chorus, "The more generations pass, the stronger we get", and then Shiori Tamai, Ayaka Sasaki, Momoka Ariyasu and Reni Takagi sang their parts, holding long notes. The reviewer said that it was "full of divine hope".

== Music video ==
The music video for the title track was directed by Masatsugu Nagasoe. It was filmed in a Candid Camera fashion, in one take. There was no prior meeting with the members of Momoiro Clover Z, who did not even know they were going to film a music video that day. When the surprise video shoot started, they were told to follow the instructions and did not know what would happen next. The music video guest-starred Akira Fukuzawa (福澤朗), a famous host of Japanese quiz shows, and comedian Korokke (コロッケ), who cross-dressed as female singer Hiromi Iwasaki.

== Track listing ==
=== Limited Edition A ===
CD
No.	Title	Length
1.	"The Golden History" (ザ・ゴールデン・ヒストリー)	5:03
2.	"Decoration" (DECORATION)	4:36
3.	"Hanabi"	5:00

Blu-ray Disc
No.	Title	Length
1.	"The Golden History" (music video)
2.	"The Golden History" (music video offshoot)

=== Limited Edition B ===
CD
No.	Title	Length
1.	"The Golden History"	5:03
2.	"Decoration"	4:36
3.	"Noruka Soruka" (伸ルカ反ルカ)	4:46

Blu-ray Disc
No.	Title	Length
1.	"Decoration" (music video)
2.	"Decoration" (music video offshoot)

=== Regular Edition ===
CD
No.	Title	Length
1.	"The Golden History"	5:03
2.	"Decoration"	4:36
3.	"Hanabi"	5:00
4.	"Noruka Soruka"	4:46

== Charts ==
Chart (2016)	Peak position
Japan (Oricon Weekly)	2
