= "Z" no Chikai =

Single by Momoiro Clover Z

- "Z" Edition cover

Single by Momoiro Clover Z

from the album Hakkin no Yoake
- B-side: "Romantikku Kongaragatteru"; "Cha-La Head-Cha-La" (incl. on "Z" Ed. only)
- Released: April 29, 2015
- Genre: Pop, rock
- Length: 4:50
- Label: Evil Line/King Records
- Songwriters: Yukinojo Mori, Narasaki

Momoiro Clover Z singles chronology
"Seishunfu" (2015)	""Z" no Chikai" (2015)	"The Golden History" (2016)

Music video
- "'Z' no Chikai" - YouTube

Alternative cover
- "F" Edition cover

""Z" no Chikai" (Japanese: 「Z」の誓い, Hepburn: Zetto no Chikai; lit. "Pledge of "Z"") is the fifteenth single by Japanese idol group Momoiro Clover Z, released on April 29, 2015. The title track is the theme song of the 2015 Dragon Ball Z: Resurrection 'F' theatrical film.

== Details ==
"Z no Chikai" is the theme song of the Dragon Ball Z: Resurrection 'F' anime film, which Momoiro Clover Z's members also perform in by voicing "angels from hell." The lyrics to the song were written by Yukinojo Mori and inspired by Akira Toriyama's Dragon Ball series.

The single was released in two versions; an "F" Edition (『F』盤) and a "Z" Edition (『Z』盤). The "F" Edition contains two tracks and their instrumental versions, a Blu-ray Disc of the title track's music video and has cover art depicting the group's members dressed as Dragon Ball character Freeza, while the back cover has a similar image as it would be seen through one of the series' "Scouter" devices. The "Z" Edition includes a cover of Dragon Ball Z's original opening theme song, "Cha-La Head-Cha-La" by Hironobu Kageyama, and an instrumental version in addition to the previous four tracks, with front and back cover art illustrations depicting the members in a Dragon Ball-style drawn by Toei Animation.

A shortened movie version of the song is included on the Dragon Ball Z: Resurrection 'F' original soundtrack released on May 8, 2015. An English-language version of the song titled "Pledge of "Z"" was recorded for use in international versions of the film. Kanako Momota admitted that the English lyrics had to be transliterated into katakana so that the members could sing them.

Momoiro Clover Z included a new version of "Z no Chikai", subtitled the "-ZZ Ver.-" and arranged by Tomoki Hasegawa, on the limited edition B version of their 2019 self-titled album.

== Music video ==
The music video for "Z no Chikai" was directed by Masatsugu Nagasoe and takes its theme from the Dragon Ball universe with the members of Momoiro Clover Z dressed as its characters. Kanako Momota is dressed as Son Goku, Shiori Tamai as Vegeta, Ayaka Sasaki as a mix of Bulma and Trunks, Momoka Ariyasu as Chaozu, and Reni Takagi as Piccolo. All of them also dress as the villain Freeza towards the end of the video.

A short version of the video was released online on April 22, 2015, while the full version was uploaded on May 1. The single's "F" Edition includes the music video on a Blu-ray Disc.

== Track listing ==
=== "F" Edition ===
No.	Title	Lyrics	Music	Arrangement	Length
1.	"Z no Chikai" (「Z」の誓い, "Pledge of Z")	Yukinojo Mori	Narasaki	Narasaki, Yuyoyuppe	4:50
2.	"Romantikku Kongaragatteru" (ロマンティックこんがらがってる, "Romantically Entangled")	Natsumi Tadano	invisible manners	invisible manners	4:05
3.	"Z no Chikai" (off vocal ver.)		Narasaki	Narasaki, Yuyoyuppe	4:50
4.	"Romantikku Kongaragatteru" (off vocal ver.)		invisible manners	invisible manners	4:05

=== "Z" Edition ===
No.	Title	Lyrics	Music	Arrangement	Length
1.	"Z no Chikai" (「Z」の誓い, "Pledge of Z")	Yukinojo Mori	Narasaki	Narasaki, Yuyoyuppe	4:50
2.	"Romantikku Kongaragatteru" (ロマンティックこんがらがってる, "Romantically Entangled")	Natsumi Tadano	invisible manners	invisible manners	4:05
3.	"Cha-La Head-Cha-La" (CHA-LA HEAD-CHA-LA)	Yukinojo Mori	Chiho Kiyooka	tatsuo	3:17
4.	"Z no Chikai" (off vocal ver.)		Narasaki	Narasaki, Yuyoyuppe	4:50
5.	"Romantikku Kongaragatteru" (off vocal ver.)		invisible manners	invisible manners	4:05
6.	"Cha-La Head-Cha-La" (off vocal ver.)		Kiyooka	tatsuo	3:17

== Charts ==
Chart (2015)	Peak position
Oricon Daily Singles Chart	2
Oricon Weekly Singles Chart	4
Billboard Japan Hot 100	5
Billboard Japan Hot Singles Sales	3
Billboard Japan Adult Contemporary Airplay	29
Billboard Japan Hot Animation	2
