= Dragon Ball Z Hit Song Collection series =

Cataloging of soundtrack album series

Cover of Never Ending Story, which includes the covers of all twenty installments of the series

Dragon Ball Z Hit Song Collection series (Japanese: ドラゴンボールZ ヒット曲集, Hepburn: Doragon Bōru Zetto Hitto Kyokushū) is a soundtrack series from the anime Dragon Ball Z. It was produced and released by Columbia Records in Japan only, from July 21, 1989, to March 20, 1996, the show's entire lifespan. The collection features a variety of theme songs, insert songs, image songs (songs inspired by the show.), character songs, instrumental suites, remixes, and medleys. On September 20, 2006, Columbia re-released the Hit Song Collection on their Animex 1300 series.

== List of albums ==
=== Hit Song Collection ===
Dragon Ball Z Hit Song Collection

Soundtrack album by Various Artists
- Released: July 21, 1989
- Length: 39:00
- Language: Japanese
- Label: Columbia
- Producer: Takashi Uchida

Dragon Ball Z Hit Song Collection (ドラゴンボールZ ヒット曲集, Doragon Bōru Zetto Hitto Kyokushū) is the first installment of the soundtrack series. It was released on July 21, 1989. This album contains the theme songs and several image songs popular among many fans. Also included on this collection is the insert song "Tenkaichi Gohan" from the first Dragon Ball Z film Ora no Gohan o Kaese!! know outside Japan as Dead Zone, and the song "Shura-Iro no Senshi", heard in the episode Yomigaeru Saiyan Densetsu! Gokū no Roots. The album cover features one of the rare images of Vegeta with his original anime color scheme.

Track listing:

1. Cha-La Head-Cha-La
2. Welcome to the Dragon World!
  ドラゴン・ワールドへようこそ! Doragon Wārudo e Yōkoso!
3. Mama is Wishing for Happiness
  ママは倖せ祈ってる Mama wa Shiawase Inotteru
4. He's That Damn Son Goku
  あいつは孫悟空 Aitsu wa Son Gokū
5. Earth of Eternity
  永遠の地球 Eien no Chikyū
6. Battle-Colors of the Warriors
  修羅色の戦士 Shura-Iro no Senshi
7. Burn, Dragon Soldiers!
  燃えろ!ドラゴン・ソルジャーズ Moero! Doragon Sorujāzu
8. Trouble Surfing
  トラブル・サーフィン Toraburu Sāfin
9. The World's Greatest Gohan
  天下-ゴハン Tenkaichi Gohan
10. Come Out, Incredible Zenkai Power!
  でてこいとびきりZENKAIパワー! Detekoi Tobikiri Zenkai Pawā!

=== Miracle Zenkai Power!! ===
Dragon Ball Z Hit Song Collection II: Miracle Zenkai Power!!

Soundtrack album by Hironobu Kageyama & Broadway
- Released: December 21, 1989
- Length: 41:54
- Language: Japanese
- Label: Columbia
- Producer: Takashi Uchida

Dragon Ball Z Hit Song Collection II: Miracle Zenkai Power!! (ドラゴンボールZ ヒット曲集II~奇蹟ZENKAIパワー!!, Doragon Bōru Zetto Hitto Kyokushū Tzū~Kiseki ZENKAI Pawā!!) is the second installment of the soundtrack series. It was released on December 21, 1989. The album's title come from lyrics found in the Dragon Ball Z closing theme song "Detekoi Tobikiri Zenkai Power!"

This collection mainly contains collaborations by both Hironobu Kageyama and J-pop group Broadway. The group had previously collaborated with Kageyama on the second opening and closing theme songs from Saint Seiya, "Soldier Dream" and "Blue Dream" respectively. Include is the song "Fly High" which was used in the episode Gokū Pawā Zenkai!! Ginga no Hate made Muikakan

Track listing:

1. Cha-La Head-Cha-La
2. No Common Sense At All
  ジョーシキなんてNA★I☆SA Jōshiki Nante NA*I*SA
3. A Big Serving of the Rice Boy
  大盛り悟空(ライス・ボーイ) Ōmori Raisu Bōi
4. From Here on Earth
  地球(ここ)から FROM THE HOME PLANET EARTH Koko Kara From the Home Planet Earth
5. Future Map
  未来地図 Mirai Chizu
6. A Full Course Unrivaled in the World
  天下無敵のフルコース Tenka-Muteki no Furukōsu
7. Fly High
8. All Alone
9. One Heart Light-Year
  1 ♥ (one・heart) 光年 1 ♥ Kōnen
10. Come Out, Incredible Zenkai Power!
  でてこいとびきりZENKAIパワー! Detekoi Tobikiri Zenkai Pawā!

=== Space Dancing ===
Dragon Ball Z Hit Song Collection III: Space Dancing

Soundtrack album by Various Artists
- Released: April 1, 1990
- Length: 40:58
- Language: Japanese
- Label: Columbia
- Producer: Takashi Uchida

Dragon Ball Z Hit Song Collection III: Space Dancing (ドラゴンボールZ ヒット曲集III~スペース･ダンシング, Doragon Bōru Zetto Hitto Kyokushū Surī~Supēsu Danshingu) is the third installment of the soundtrack series. It was released on April 1, 1990. The album would peak at 56 on Oricon's Japanese album charts.

The album contains the standard television theme songs and six image songs, with four tracks performed by J-pop artist Kuko. Also featured are two songs from the second The World's Strongest, which are the Gohan image song "Piccolo-san Da~isuki♡" and the closing theme "Ikusa".

Track listing:

1. Cha-La Head-Cha-La
2. Dancing in the Space
3. Cosmic Chinese Melody
4. Good Night My Blue
5. Bad Boy
6. Sign of a Storm (Silent Noise)
  嵐の前兆~無言のざわめき~ Arashi no Zenchō~Mugon no Zawameki~
7. Space Dance
  スペース・ダンス Supēsu Dansu
8. The Battle
  戦(I・KU・SA) Ikusa (I-KU-SA)
9. I Lo~ve Mr. Piccolo♡
  ピッコロさんだ~いすき♡ Pikkoro-san Da~isuki♡
10. Come Out, Incredible Zenkai Power!
  でてこいとびきりZENKAIパワー! Detekoi Tobikiri Zenkai Pawā!

=== Character Special ===
Dragon Ball Z Hit Song Collection IV: Character Special

Soundtrack album by Various Artists
- Released: October 1, 1990
- Length: 38:16
- Language: Japanese
- Label: Columbia
- Producer: Takashi Uchida

Dragon Ball Z Hit Song Collection IV: Character Special (ドラゴンボールZ ヒット曲集IV~キャラクターズ・スペシャル, Doragon Bōru Zetto Hitto Kyokushū Foru~Kyarakutāzu Supesharu) is the fourth installment of the soundtrack series. It was released on October 1, 1990. The album is composed mostly of character songs from the Dragon Ball Z cast, along with the song "Solid State Scouter" by Jpop band Tokio, heard in the Bardock TV special. It would go on to peak at 95 on Oricon's Japanese album charts.

Track listing:

1. Cha-La Head-Cha-La
2. Solid State Scouter
  ソリッドステート・スカウター Soriddo Sutēto Sukautā
3. The Healthy Polka
  お達者ポルカ O-tassha Poruka
4. Morning – Daytime – Night – You – Me
  アサ・ヒル・ヨル・キミ・ボク Asa – Hiru – Yoru – Kimi – Boku
5. Blow, Wind! Call Out, Shenlong!!
  吹けよ風 呼べよ神龍(シェンロン)!! Fuke Yo Kaze Yobe Yo Shenron!!
6. If I Tell a Joke, It's an Exciting Fountain of Life!!
  シャレれば命の泉わくわく!! Sharereba Inochi no Izumi Waku-Waku!!
7. Energy of Ours
  俺たちのエナジー Ore-tachi no Enajī
8. Two Heartly Soaked People
  心から濡れた二人 Kokoro Kara Nureta Futari
9. The Girl is Acting Cruelly
  女の子は罪作り On'na no Ko wa Tsumitsukuri
10. Come Out, Incredible Zenkai Power!
  でてこいとびきりZENKAIパワー! Detekoi Tobikiri Zenkai Pawā!

=== Journey of Light ===
Dragon Ball Z Hit Song Collection V: Journey of Light

Soundtrack album by Various Artists
- Released: December 21, 1990
- Length: 48:54
- Language: Japanese
- Label: Columbia
- Producer: Takashi Uchida

Dragon Ball Z Hit Song Collection V: Journey of Light (Japanese: ドラゴンボールZ ヒット曲集V~光の旅, Hepburn: Doragon Bōru Zetto Hitto Kyokushū Faivu~Hikari no Tabi) is the fifth installment of the soundtrack series. It was released on December 21, 1990.

This features remixes to the Dragon Ball opening theme "Makafushigi Adventure" and the closing theme to the third film The Tree of Might, "Marugoto". Also featured is the closing theme to the Bardock TV special, "Hikari no Tabi" which doubles as the title track to the album. As a result, much of the album's production art is made up of freeze frames from the TV special.

Track listing:

1. Journey of Light (Overture)
  光の旅(オーヴァーチュア) Hikari no Tabi (Ōvāchua)
2. Mystical Adventure! (New Remix Long Version)
  摩訶不思議アドベンチャー!(ニュー・リミックス・ロング・ヴァージョン) Makafushigi Adobenchā! (Nyū Rimikkusu Rongu Vājon)
3. Poetry of a Certain Star★
  ある星の詩★ Aru Hoshi no Shi★
4. Happy Birthday
5. Cha-La Head-Cha-La (Space Version)
  スペース・ヴァージョン Cha-La Head-Cha-La (Supēsu Vājon)
6. Planet to Planet
7. Gold-Colored Eggs
  金色た・ま・ご Kin-Iro Ta-ma-go
8. The Whole World (New Remix Long Version)
  まるごと(ニュー・リミックス・ロング・ヴァージョン) Marugoto (Nyū Rimikkusu Rongu Vājon)
9. Doodlebug
  蟻地獄 Arijigoku
10. The Spirit Road
  魂の道 Tamashī no Michi
11. Poetry of a Certain Star★★
  ある星の詩★★ Aru Hoshi no Shi★★
12. Journey of Light
  光の旅 Hikari no Tabi
13. Come Out, Incredible Zenkai Power!!
  でてこいとびきりZENKAIパワー! Detekoi Tobikiri Zenkai Pawā!

=== BP∞ Battle Points Unlimited ===
Dragon Ball Z Hit Song Collection 6: BP∞ Battle Points Unlimited

Soundtrack album by Various Artists
- Released: March 21, 1991
- Length: 40:29
- Language: Japanese
- Label: Columbia
- Producer: Takashi Uchida

Dragon Ball Z Hit Song Collection VI: BP∞ Battle Points Unlimited (ドラゴンボールZ ヒット曲集VI~BP∞バトルポイント・アンリミテッド, Doragon Bōru Zetto Hitto Kyokushū Shikkusu~Batoru Pointo Anrimiteddo) is the sixth installment of the soundtrack series. It was released on March 21, 1991. The album would go on to peak at 71 on Oricon's Japanese album charts.

The album comes off as a soundtrack for the fourth Dragon Ball Z film Lord Slug due to it containing production art plus two songs from the film the closing theme ""Ya" na Koto ni wa Genki-Dama!!" and "Kuchibue no Kimochi" a vocalized of Gohan's whistling melody which was originally performed by Hajime Ueshiba. The title track "BP∞ Battle Points Unlimited" is the instrumental insert that was played in episode 120 entitled Freeza wo Ittō Ryōdan!! Mō Hitori no Super Saiyan (Known as Another Super Saiyan? in the Funimation dub).

The Dragon Ondo or Dragon March is a song and dance. The album's booklet illustrated step-by-step instructions featuring Gohan demonstrating the dance.

Track listing:

1. Cha-La Head-Cha-La
2. BP∞ Battle Point Unlimited: Overture
  BP∞バトルポイント・アンリミテッド OVERTURE BP∞ Batoru Pointo Anrimiteddo Overture
3. Give a Genki-Dama at Bad Things!!
  「ヤ」なことは元気玉!! "Ya" na Koto ni wa Genki-Dama!!
4. My Pace
  マイペース Mai Pēsu
5. Mai My Every Day
  マイ・My・毎日 Mai • My • Mainichi
6. Like a Machine...: Battling Machine
  機械の様に...-バトリング・マシン- Kikai no Yō ni...--Batoringu Mashin--
7. BP∞ Battle Point Unlimited
  BP∞バトルポイント・アンリミテッド BP∞ Batoru Pointo Anrimiteddo
8. Fragments of a Dream
  夢のｩけら Yume no Kakera
9. Dragon March
  ドラゴンONDO Doragon Ondo
10. Feeling of Whistling
  口笛の気持ち Kuchibue no Kimochi
11. Come Out, Incredible Zenkai Power!
  でてこいとびきりZENKAIパワー! Detekoi Tobikiri Zenkai Pawā!

=== The Journey of the 7 Balls ===
Dragon Ball Z Hit Song Collection 7: The Journey of the 7 Balls

Soundtrack album by Various Artists
- Released: July 1, 1991
- Length: 52:24
- Language: Japanese
- Label: Columbia
- Producer: Takashi Uchida

Dragon Ball Z Hit Song Collection 7: The Journey of the 7 Balls (ドラゴンボールZ ヒット曲集7~ドラゴンボールZ ヒット曲集7~ザ・ジャーニー・オブ・ザ・7ボール, Doragon Bōru Zetto Hitto Kyokushū Seban~Za Jānī obu za Seban Bōru) is the seventh installment of the soundtrack series. It was released on March 21, 1991. This album features a handful of instrumental tracks representing each Dragon Ball's journey after they are used to summon the dragon, as well as the closing theme to the fifth film Cooler's Revenge. It would go on to peak at 50 on Oricon's Japanese album charts.

Track listing:

1. Cha-La Head-Cha-La
2. The Journey of the 7TH. Ball《Overture》
3. The Incredible Mightiest vs. Mightiest
  とびっきりの最強対最強 Tobikkiri no Saikyō tai Saikyō
4. The Journey of the 1ST. Ball
5. Power of Smile
  パワー・オブ・スマイル Pawā obu Sumairu
6. The Journey of the 2ND. Ball
7. It's Easy if you Close your Eyes
  目を閉じればカンタン Me o Tojireba Kantan
8. The Journey of the 3RD. Ball
9. Like the Wind, Like the Stars «Part 1»
  風の様に 星の様に《パート1》 Kaze no yō ni Hoshi no yō ni «Pāto Wan»
10. Like the Wind, Like the Stars «Part 2»
  風の様に 星の様に《パート2》 Kaze no yô ni Hoshi no yô ni «Pāto Tzū»
11. The Journey of the 4TH. Ball
12. Somebody and Good Weather
  だれかさんといい天気 Dareka-san to Ii Tenki
13. The Journey of the 5TH. Ball
14. Beneath Time and Light
  時と光の下で Toki to Hikari no Shita de
15. The Journey of the 6TH. Ball
16. Dragon Magic Carnival
  ドラゴン・マジック・カーニヴァル Doragon Majikku Kānibaru
17. The Journey of the 7TH. Ball
18. Come Out, Incredible Zenkai Power!
  でてこいとびきりZENKAIパワー!
  Detekoi Tobikiri Zenkai Pawā!

=== Character Special 2 ===
Dragon Ball Z Hit Song Collection 8: Character Special 2

Soundtrack album by Various Artists
- Released: September 21, 1991
- Genre: Anime
- Length: 10:40
- Language: Japanese
- Label: Columbia
- Producer: Takashi Uchida

Dragon Ball Z Hit Song Collection 8: Character Special 2 (ドラゴンボールZ ヒット曲集8~キャラクターズ・スペシャル2, Doragon Bōru Zetto Hitto Kyokushū Etto~Kyarakutāzu Supesharu Tzu) is the eighth installment of the soundtrack series. It was released on September 21, 1991. This album is a follow-up to the fourth installment to the series, titled Character Special, which was released in 1990. The album is made up of character songs from the Dragon Ball cast. It would go on to peak at 76 on Oricon's Japanese album charts.

The album initially picks up where the other character special leaves off. Each song in a way, tells their own unique story. "Capsule Corp." is simply Bulma making random comments about whatever she's doing. "Ichido wa Kekkon Shitai Mambo" features Kuririn singing cheerfully about how much he desires to get married. "Vegeta-sama no Oryori Jigoku!!" marks the only character song in the series, but not the last, by Vegeta. Here, he sings about cooking a special Okonomiyaki while giving "battle commands" to his ingredients who sing backup. "Share 'reba Inochi no Izumi Waku-Waku!! 2" is the follow-up to "Share 'reba Inochi no Izumi Waku-Waku!!" which is both performed by the northern Kaio-sama. Once again he continues to tell jokes that he only finds funny. By the end of the song he has succumbed to a fit of laughter. "Kuchibue no Kimochi Piccolo-Hen" is a follow-up to "Kuchibue no Kimochi", Gohan's whistling tune from movie four which was made into a character song for Gohan in Hit 6. This version is done from Piccolo's point of view. As established in movie four, Piccolo is sensitive to the sound whistling due to his adept hearing. As a result, for most of the song he complains and begs for the whistler to stop until he gives up and rockets away. Prompting an unidentified person to appear and comment on the chirping birds. "I•ke•na•i Oo-La-La Magic" features Chi-Chi forcing Gohan to take part in a mother-son karaoke duet as his and Goku's adventures has made Chi-Chi feel left out. Her plan is to compete in the local karaoke circuit with Gohan.

Despite its focus being on character songs, the album also features an image song by "Pochi featuring Apple Pie" called "Omoide no Tenkaichi Budokai". Which recalls the previous budokais in which Goku participated. Also included, the incidental piece "Takkaraputo Popporunga Pupiritto Paro" from episode 75, Nanatsu no Tama o Soroeshi Mono yo... Sā Aikotoba o Ie!, which serves as Porunga's summoning theme.

Track listing:

1. Cha-La Head-Cha-La
2. Capsule Corp.
3. The I-Want-to-Get-Married-For-Once Mambo
  一度は結婚したいマンボ Ichido wa Kekkon Shitai Manbo
4. Lord Vegeta's Cooking Hell!! (The "Okonomiyaki" Recipe)
  ベジータ様のお料理地獄ー「お好み焼き」の巻ー Bejīta-sama no Oryōri Jigoku!!~"Okonomiyaki" no Kan~
5. Memories of the Tenkaichi Budokai
  想い出の天下一武道会 Omoide no Tenkaichi Budōkai
6. If I Tell a Joke, It's an Exciting Fountain of Life!! 2
  シャレれば命の泉わくわく!!2 Share 'reba Inochi no Izumi Waku-Waku!! Tzū
7. The Feeling of Whistling Piccolo Edit
  口笛の気持ち・ピッコロ編
  Kuchibue no Kimochi • Pikkoro Hen
8. The Wrong Kind of Ooh-La-La Magic
  イ・ケ・ナ・イうららマジック I•ke•na•i Urara Majikku
9. Takkaraputo Popporunga Pupiritto Paro
  タッカラプトポッポルンガプピリットパロ
10. Come Out, Incredible Zenkai Power!
  でてこいとびきりZENKAIパワー! Detekoi Tobikiri Zenkai Pawā!

=== 8½: Special ===
Dragon Ball Z Hit Song Collection 8½: Special

Remix album by Various Artists
- Released: November 1, 1991
- Length: 46:15
- Language: Japanese
- Label: Columbia
- Producer: Takashi Uchida

Dragon Ball Z Hit Song Collection 8½: Special (ドラゴンボールZ ヒット曲集8½~スペシャル, Doragon Bōru Zetto Hitto Kyokushū Etto nibun-no-ichi~Supesharu), despite its title, is the ninth installment of the soundtrack series. It was released on November 1, 1991. This album is one of two remix albums produced in the Hit Song Collection series, hence the ½ to the installment number.

Track listing:

1. Overture between 8 and 9
2. The Mysteries of Love
  恋のNAZONAZO Koi no NazoNazo
3. 《Super House Version》Welcome to the Dragon World!
  ドラゴン・ワールドへようこそ! 《Super House Version》Doragon Wārudo e Yōkoso!
4. 《Super Watch-Me-Polish-Them Version》 Bad Boy
  《Super 磨いてみてよ Version》Bad Boy 《Super Migai te mi te yo Version》Bad Boy
5. 《Super Adventure Version》Cha-La Head-Cha-La
6. 《Super House Version》Come Out, Incredible Zenkai Power!
  でてこいとびきりZENKAIパワー！ 《Super House Version》Detekoi Tobikiri Zenkai Pawā!
7. 《Ultra New Edition》Kuko's Dance Medley
8. 《Ultra New Edition》Kageyama's Power Medley
9. Soft Light, Gentle Gaze
  素直な光 優しい視線 Sunao na Hikari Yasashī Shisen

Kuko's Dance Medley (Ultra New Edition):

1. Mama is Wishing for Happiness
  ママは倖せ祈ってる Mama wa Shiawase Inotteru
2. He's That Damn Son Goku
  あいつは孫悟空 Aitsu wa Son Gokū
3. Dancing in the Space
4. Cosmic Chinese Melody
5. Space Dance
  スペース・ダンス Supēsu Dansu
6. Power of Smile
  パワー・オブ・スマイル Pawā obu Sumairu

Kageyama's Power Medley (Ultra New Edition):

1. Battle-Color of Warriors
  修羅色の戦士 Shura-Iro no Senshi
2. Give a Genki-Dama at Bad Things!!
  「ヤ」なことには元気玉!! "Ya" na Koto ni wa Genki Dama!!
3. He's That Damn Son Goku
  あいつは孫悟空 Aitsu wa Son Gokū
4. The Spirit Road
  魂の道 Tamashii no Michi
5. Battle
  戦(I・KU・SA) Ikusa (I-ku-sa)
6. The Incredible Mightiest vs. Mightiest
  とびっきりの最強対最強 Tobikkiri no Saikyō tai Saikyō

=== Future Shock!! ===
Dragon Ball Z Hit Song Collection 9: Future Shock!!

Soundtrack album by Various Artists
- Released: December 21, 1991
- Length: 48:10
- Language: Japanese
- Label: Columbia
- Producer: Takashi Uchida

Dragon Ball Z Hit Song Collection 9: Future Shock!! (ドラゴンボールZ ヒット曲集9~フューチャー・ショック!!, Doragon Bōru Zetto Hitto Kyokushū Nain~Fyūchā Shokku!!), despite its title, is the tenth installment of the soundtrack series. It was released on November 1, 1991. The album would go on to peak at 75 on Oricon's Japanese album charts. Included is the song from episode 139 titled "Mind Power...Ki...", which was used in Trunks' flashback.

Track listing:

1. Cha-La Head-Cha-La
2. Mind Power...Ki...
  MIND POWER... 気...
3. A Message From the Future
  未来からの伝言... Message From Future...Mirai Kara no Dengon...
4. Warning of Danger...Warning...
  警告... Warning of Danger...Keikoku...
5. Welcome Home, My Boy...Name of The Wind...
  風の名前... Welcome Home, My Boy...Kaze no Namae...
6. Super Power Melody
  超力節... Super Purasu Power Ekuaruzu Melody...Chō-Ryoku-Bushi...
7. It's a Small World...Beneath My Little Finger...
  小指の下で... IT'S A SmallWorld...Koyubi no Shita de...
8. Sweet Lovely Midnight...The Other Side of The Moon...
  月の裏側... Sweet Lovely Midnight...Tsuki no Uragawa...
9. White, the World, and the Heart
  白と世界と心... White ando World ando True...Shiro to Sekai to Kokoro
10. Come Out, Incredible Zenkai Power!
  でてこいとびきりZENKAIパワー! Detekoi Tobikiri Zenkai Pawā!

=== Virtual Triangle ===
Dragon Ball Z Hit Song Collection 10: Virtual Triangle

Soundtrack album by Various Artists
- Released: March 21, 1992
- Length: 12:49
- Language: Japanese
- Label: Columbia
- Producer: Takashi Uchida

Dragon Ball Z Hit Song Collection 10: Virtual Triangle (ドラゴンボールZ ヒット曲集10~ヴァーチャル・トライアングル, Doragon Bōru Zetto Hitto Kyokushū Ten~Vācharu Toraianguru), despite its title, is the eleventh installment of the soundtrack series. It was released on March 21, 1992. The album would go to peak at 40 on the Oricon Japanese album charts. Included is song "Hero (Kimi ga Hero)" which was used as the closing to film The Return of Cooler.

Track listing:

1. Cha-La Head-Cha-La
2. Triangle 2
3. Hero (You're the Hero)
  HERO (キミがヒーロー) Hero (Kimi ga Hīrō)
4. In That Sort of Mood
  そんな気分で Son'na Kibun de
5. Comet Library
  流星図書館~コメットライブラリー Ryūsei Toshokan~Kometto Raiburarī
6. Good E[nergy]
  EなE E na E
7. Suite: Virtual Triangle
8. Keep My Way
9. Firefly
  Ho・Ta・Lu
10. Triangle 3
11. Awesome Energy
  イカしたエナジー Ikashita Enajī
12. Come Out, Incredible Zenkai Power!
  でてこいとびきりZENKAIパワー! Detekoi Tobikiri Zenkai Pawā!

=== The Room of "Mind and Time" ===
Dragon Ball Z Hit Song Collection 11: The Room of 'Mind and Time'

Soundtrack album by Various Artists
- Released: July 1, 1992
- Length: 48:00
- Language: Japanese
- Label: Columbia
- Producer: Takashi Uchida

Dragon Ball Z Hit Song Collection 11: The Room of 'Mind and Time' (ドラゴンボールZ ヒット曲集11～"精神と時"の部屋, Doragon Bōru Zetto Hitto Kyokushū Iriven: 'Seishin to Toki' no Heya), despite its title, is the twelfth installment of the soundtrack series. It was released on July 1, 1992. The album would go on to peak at 82 on Oricon's Japanese album charts. Included is the song "Giri Giri—Sekai Kyokugen--", which was used as the closing theme to the film Super Android 13.

Track listing:

1. Cha-La Head-Cha-La
2. The Bug News
  虫のしらせ Mushi no Shirase
3. Hypnosis Banana
  催眠バナナ Saimin Banana
4. Brain Dance
5. At the Brink: The Earth's Limit
  GIRIGIRI-世界極限- Giri Giri—Sekai Kyokugen--
6. Twisted Spoon
  ねじれたスプーン Nejireta Supūn
7. Compass of Gold
  黄金のコンパス Ōgon no Konpasu
8. Voice
9. X Spot
  X点 X Ten
10. Aquarium of Night
  アクアリウムの夜 Akuariumu no Yoru
11. A Top
12. Mad Magnets
  狂った磁石 Kurutta Jishaku
13. Encyclopedia Fantasy
  百科事典幻想曲 Hyakkajiten Gensōkyoku
14. Dream Upon a Star
  星の見た夢 Hoshi no Mita Yume

=== DBZ a Go Go!! ===
Dragon Ball Z Hit Song Collection 12: DBZ a Go Go!!

Soundtrack album by Various Artists
- Released: September 21, 1992
- Length: 45:00
- Language: Japanese
- Label: Columbia
- Producer: Takashi Uchida

Dragon Ball Z Hit Song Collection 12: DBZ a Go Go!! (ドラゴンボールZ ヒット曲集12~DBZ ア・ゴー・ゴー!!, Doragon Bōru Zetto Hitto Kyokushū Tuwaruvu~DBZ a Gō Gō!!), despite its title, is the thirteenth installment of the soundtrack series. It was released on September 21, 1992.

Track listing:

1. Cha-La Head-Cha-La
2. Please: Wish of a Lifetime!!
  Please Isshō no Onegai!!
3. Delight to you・・・
4. Go! Go! Go! On a Red Train
  LED TRAIN で GO!GO!GO! Led Train de GO!GO!GO!
5. SpacepeopleDBZ
6. Roller-Through 55
  ローラー・スルー55 Rōrā Surū 55
7. Cool Cool Dandy
  Cool Cool ダンディ Cool Cool Dandi
8. Wild Dance Night 《Run At Full Speed Until Dawn》
  夜明けまで突っ走れ Wild Dance Night《Yoake Made Tsuppashire》
9. Heartbreak Melody, For No Reason
  ハートブレイク・メロディ,みょうに Hātobureiku Merodi, Myō ni
10. 《Super House Version》 Come Out, Incredible Zenkai Power!
  でてこい とびきり ZENKAIパワー! 《Super House Version》 Detekoi Tobikiri Zenkai Pawā!

=== Battle & Hope ===
Dragon Ball Z Hit Song Collection 13: Battle & Hope

Soundtrack album by Various Artists
- Released: December 21, 1992
- Length: 50:00
- Language: Japanese
- Label: Columbia
- Producer: Takashi Uchida

Dragon Ball Z Hit Song Collection 13: Battle & Hope (ドラゴンボールZ ヒット曲集13~バトルス&ホープ, Doragon Bōru Zetto Hitto Kyokushū Derutēn~Batorusu ando Hōpu), despite its title, is the fourteenth installment of the soundtrack series. It was released on December 21, 1992.

Included is the song "Unmei no Hi~Tamashī vs Tamashī", which was used in episode 184 for Gohan's Super Saiyan 2 explosion, and the song "Aoi Kaze no Hope" which was used as the closing theme to the Trunks TV special.

Track listing:

1. Cha-La Head-Cha-La
2. The Sounds of Battles to Come: Scene-1
3. Day of Destiny: Spirit vs. Spirit
4. The Sounds of Battles to Come: Scene-2
5. I'm a Positive Girl!!
6. The Sounds of Battles to Come: Scene-3
7. Children of the Dawn
  夜明けの子供たち Yoake no Kodomo-tachi
8. The Sounds of Battles to Come: Scene-4
9. For ever～
10. The Sounds of Battles to Come: Scene-5
11. Challenge
  挑戦状 Chōsenjō
12. The Sounds of Battles to Come: Scene-6
13. Don't be Unkind to it...
  イジワルしないでね Ijiwaru Shinai De Ne...
14. The Sounds of Battles to Come: Scene-7
15. Blue Wind of Hope
  青い風のHOPE Aoi Kaze no Hope
16. Suite: The Sounds of Battles to Come
17. Come Out, Incredible Zenkai Power!
  でてこいとびきりZENKAIパワー! Detekoi Tobikiri Zenkai Pawā!

=== Straight ===
Dragon Ball Z Hit Song Collection 14: Straight

Soundtrack album by Various Artists
- Released: March 21, 1993
- Length: 35:00
- Language: Japanese
- Label: Columbia
- Producer: Takashi Uchida

Dragon Ball Z Hit Song Collection 14: Straight (ドラゴンボールZ ヒット曲集14~ストレ-ト, Doragon Bōru Zetto Hitto Kyokushū Fōrutēn~Sutorēto) despite its title is the fifteenth installment of the soundtrack series. It was released on March 21, 1993. Included is the song "Burning Fight—Nessen – Ressen – Chōgekisen--", which was used as the closing theme to the film Broly: The Legendary Super Saiyan.

Track listing:'

1. Cha-La Head-Cha-La
2. Burning Fight: a Close, Intense, Super-Fierce Battle
  バーニング・ファイト-熱戦・烈戦・超激戦- Bāningu Faito—Nessen – Ressen – Chōgekisen--
3. Water-Colored Aliens
  水色星人 Mizu-Iro Seinin
4. Adventures Surrounding the Skies
  空めぐる冒険 Sora Meguru Bōken
5. Something is... (Unknown Power)
  何かが...(未知の力) Nanika ga... (Michi no Chikara)
6. Love Jet
  ラブ・ジェット Rabu Jetto
7. The Future That Came Back With the Trickster
  トリックスターと帰って来た未来 Torikkusutā to Kaettekita Mirai
8. I'm Straight, the Road is Straight
  僕は,まっすぐ 道は,まっすぐ Boku wa, Massugu Machi wa, Massugu
9. Mother Universe
  マザー・ユニバース Mazā Yunibāsu
10. Come Out, Incredible Zenkai Power!
  でてこいとびきりZENKAIパワー! Detekoi Tobikiri Zenkai Pawā!

=== Sunlight & City Lights ===
Dragon Ball Z Hit Song Collection 15: Sunlight & City Lights

Soundtrack album by Various Artists
- Released: July 21, 1993
- Length: 42:00
- Language: Japanese
- Label: Columbia
- Producer: Takashi Uchida

Dragon Ball Z Hit Song Collection 15: Sunlight & City Lights (ドラゴンボールZ ヒット曲集15~サンライト&シティ・ライツ, Doragon Bōru Zetto Hitto Kyokushū Fifutēn~San Raito ando Shiti Raits), despite its title, is the sixteenth installment of the soundtrack series. It was released on July 21, 1993. This release has the distinction of being the last installment to include the first opening and closing theme song. Included is the song "Ginga o Koete Rising High", which used as the closing to the film Bojack Unbound.

Track listing:

1. Cha-La Head-Cha-La
2. Fly Away, Hero!
  飛び出せ!ヒーロー Tobidase! Hīrō
3. Magician of Mine
  私のMagician Watashi no Magician
4. Triangle of Stars
  星のトライアングル Hoshi no Toraianguru
5. Sunlight & City Lights
6. The Sky, and Rain, and...
  空と雨と... Sora to Ame to...
7. Let me Tell a Joke...
  Jokeぐらい言わせろよ Joke-Gurai Iwasero Yo...
8. My Song For You
9. Surpassing the Galaxy, Rising High
  銀河を超えてライジング・ハイ Ginga o Koete Raijingu Hai
10. Fly Away, Hero! (Reprise)
  飛び出せ!ヒーロー(reprise) Tobidase! Hīrō (reprise)
11. Come Out, Incredible Zenkai Power!
  でてこいとびきりZENKAIパワー Detekoi Tobikiri Zenkai Pawā!

=== We Gotta Power ===
Dragon Ball Z Hit Song Collection 16: We Gotta Power

Soundtrack album by Various Artists
- Released: June 1, 1994
- Length: 40:00
- Language: Japanese
- Label: Columbia
- Producer: Takashi Uchida

Dragon Ball Z Hit Song Collection 16: We Gotta Power (ドラゴンボールZ ヒット曲集16~ウィ・ガッタ・パワー, Doragon Bōru Zetto Hitto Kyokushū Shikkusutēn~Wi Gatta Pawā) despite its title is the seventeenth installment of the soundtrack series. It was released on June 1, 1994. We Gotta Power is the second opening theme of Dragon Ball Z, replacing Cha-La Head-Cha-La from episode 200 until the end of the series.

Track listing:

1. We Gotta Power
2. Hey You, Crasher
3. Jumpin' Jump!!
4. Stop, Time: My Name is Father
  時よ止まれ~MY NAME IS FATHER~ Toki Yo Tomare~My Name is Father
5. Me, I Am a Magician
  僕は魔法使い Boku wa Mahōtsukai
6. Fight Oh Fighting Road
7. Que Será
  ケ・セラ Ke Sera
8. It Is Silence...Afterward
  あとはSilence... Ato wa Silence...
9. Surpass Your Power
  力を超えて Chikara o Koete
10. We Were Angels
  僕達は天使だった Boku-tachi wa Tenshi Datta

=== Hippy Hoppy Shake!! ===
Dragon Ball Z Hit Song Collection 17: Hippy Hoppy Shake!!

Soundtrack album by Various Artists
- Released: March 1, 1995
- Length: 42:50
- Language: Japanese
- Label: Columbia
- Producer: Takashi Uchida

Dragon Ball Z Hit Song Collection 17: Hippy Hoppy Shake!! (ドラゴンボールZ ヒット曲集17~ヒッピー・ホッピー・シェイク!!, Doragon Bōru Zetto Hitto Kyokushū Sebantēn~Hippī Hoppī Sheiku!!), despite its title, is the eighteenth installment of the soundtrack series. It was released on March 1, 1995.

Track listing:

1. We Gotta Power
2. Bring It On My Way
  ジャンジャカMy Way Janjaka My Way
3. This is Life!
4. Goodbye Mr. Loneliness: To the Other Side of the Light
  Good-Bye Mr.Loneliness~光の彼方へ~ Good-Bye Mr.Loneliness~Hikari no Kanata e~
5. A Ballad Dedicated to Majin Boo
  魔人ブウに捧げるバラッド Majin Bū ni Sasageru Baraddo
6. Hooray for the End of the Century!
  世紀末万歳! Seiki-Matsu Banzai!
7. Hippy Hoppy Shake!!
8. Ossan's Dilemma
9. Goodbye, Tears!
  さらば涙よ Saraba Namida Yo
10. We Were Angels
  僕達は天使だった Boku-tachi wa Tenshi Datta

=== Praise for the Future ===
Dragonball Z Hit Collection 18: Praise for the Future

Soundtrack album by Various Artists
- Released: January 21, 1996
- Length: 43:30
- Language: Japanese
- Label: Columbia
- Producer: Takashi Uchida

Dragonball Z Hit Collection 18: Praise for the Future (ドラゴンボールZ ヒット曲集18~未来への賛歌, Doragon Bōru Zetto Hitto Kyokushū Ettotēn~Mirai e no Sanka) despite its title is the nineteenth installment of the soundtrack series. It was released on January 21, 1996. Included is the song "Ore ga Yaranakya Dare ga Yaru" which was used as the closing theme to the film Wrath of the Dragon.

Track listing:

1. We Gotta Power
2. Yesterday's Dreams, Today's Light: Silent Night, Morning Moon
  昨日の夢、今日の光-サイレントナイト・モーニングムーン- Kinō no Yume, Kyō no Hikari—Sairento Naito Mōningu Mūn--
3. 10,000,000,000 Friends
  100億のフレンズ 100-Oku no Furenzu
4. Tragedy of Majin Boo
  魔人ブウの悲劇 Majin Bū no Higeki
5. Memories: An Evening Without Him
  メモリーズ-奴のいない夜- Memorīzu—Yatsu no Inai Yoru--
6. If I Don't Do It, Who Will?
  俺がやらなきゃ誰がやる Ore ga Yaranakya Dare ga Yaru
7. Perfume No. 18 (Diabolical Fragrance)
  perfume N゜18~魔性の香り~ perfum No 18 ~Mashō no Kaori~
8. An Earth Within Your Eyes
  瞳の中の地球 Hitomi no Naka no Chikyū
9. Growin' Up: Until the Day We Can Meet Again
  Growin' Up いつかまた逢える日まで... Growin' Up Itsuka Mata Aeru Hi Made
10. We Were Angels
  僕達は天使だった Boku-tachi wa Tenshi Datta

=== 18½ Special: Super Remix ===
Dragon Ball Z Hit Song Collection 18½ Special: Super Remix

Remix album by Various Artists
- Released: March 20, 1996
- Length: 55:57
- Language: Japanese
- Label: Columbia

Dragon Ball Z Hit Song Collection 18½ Special: Super Remix (ドラゴンボールZ ヒット曲集18½ Special~SUPER REMIX, Doragon Bōru Zetto Hitto Kyokushū Ettotēn nibun-no-ichi Special~SUPER REMIX) is the final installment of the soundtrack series, released on March 20, 1996. Like its predecessor, Hit 8½, it is composed of remixes and medleys, but unlike 8½ it contains no exclusive songs.

Track listing:

1. Cha-La Head-Cha-La (Jungle Fever Mix)
2. Battle Spectacle Medley
3. For ever '96 (Piano New Version)
4. At The Brink: The Earth's Limit (Extreme Hard Metal Mix)
  GIRI GIRI-世界極限-~EXTREME HARD METAL MIX Giri Giri—Sekai Kyokugen--~Extreme Hard Metal Mix~
5. Please: Wish of a Lifetime! (Acid Club Mix)
  Please Isshō no Onegai~Acid Club Mix~
6. Perfum No.18 (Dangerous Fragrance Mix)
7. Surpassing the Galaxy, Rising High (Galaxy Adventure Mix)
  銀河を超えてライジング・ハイ~GALAXY ADVENTURE MIX~ Ginga o Koete Raijingu Hai ~Galaxy Adventure Mix~
8. Fly Away: Hero! (Dream Theater Mix)
  飛び出せ!ヒーロー~DREAM THEATRE MIX~ Tobidase! Hīrō~Dream Theater Mix~
9. Journey of light '96 (Classical New Version)
  光の旅'96~CLASSICAL NEW VERSION~ Hikari no Tabi '96~Classical New Version~

Battle Spectacle Medley:

1. Mind Power...Ki...
  MIND POWER-気-
2. Warning of Danger...Warning...
  WARNING OF DANGER-警告- Warning of Danger...Keikoku...
3. Challenge
  挑戦状 Chōsenjō
4. Day of Destiny: Spirit vs. Spirit
  運命の日-魂VS魂- Unmei no Hi~Tamashii VS Tamashii~

=== Never Ending Story ===
Dragon Ball Z: Hit Song Collection Best "Never Ending Story"

Greatest hits album by Various Artists
- Released: November 30, 1996
- Length: 129:14
- Language: Japanese
- Label: Columbia
- Producer: Takashi Uchida

Dragon Ball Z: Hit Song Collection Best "Never Ending Story" (ドラゴンボールZ ヒット曲集ベスト"ネヴァー・エンディング・ストーリー", Doragon Bōru Zetto Hitto Kyokushū Besuto "Nevuā Endeingu Sutōrī") is a two-disc CD soundtrack set. It was released on November 30, 1996.

This includes tracks considered fan favorites spanning all twenty of the Hit Song Collection Series. The first disc's tracklist is made up of fast-paced tracks, while the second disc's tracklist is made of soft ballads. An exclusive to this collection is the song "Kimi no Sora e".

Disc One:

1. He's That Damn Son Goku
  あいつは孫悟空 Aitsu wa Son Gokū
2. Happy Birthday
3. Power of Smile
  パワー・オブ・スマイル Pawā obu Sumairu
4. Mind Power...Ki...
  MIND POWER...気...
5. Hero (You're the Hero)
  HERO~キミがヒーロー HERO (Kimi ga Hīrō)<
6. Brain Dance
7. SpacepeopleDBZ
8. Cool Cool Dandy
  Cool Cool ダンディ Cool Cool Dandi
9. Day of Destiny: Spirit vs. Spirit
  運命の日~魂VS魂 Unmei no hi~Tamashī VS Tamashī
10. Children of the Dawn
  夜明けの子供たち Yoake no Kodomo-tachi
11. Blue Wind of Hope
  青い風のHOPE Aoi Kaze no HOPE
12. Surpassing the Galaxy, Rising High
  銀河を超えてライジング・ハイ Ginga o Koete Raijingu Hai
13. Fly Away, Hero!: Reprise
  飛び出せ!ヒーロー~リプライズ Tobidase! Hīrō~Ripuraizu
14. Growin' Up: Until the Day We Can Meet Again...
  Growin'Up~いつかまた逢える日まで... Growin'Up~Itsuka Mata Aeru Hi Made...
15. Cha-La Head-Cha-La (Jungle Fever Mix)

Disc Two:

1. Earth of Eternity
  永遠の地球 Eien no Chikyū
2. Good Night My Blue
3. Journey of Light
  光の旅 Hikari no Tabi
4. Fragments of a Dream
  夢のかけら Yume no Kakera
5. Beneath Time and Light
  時と光の下で Toki to Hikari no Shita de
6. A Message From the Future
  未来からの伝言... MESSAGE FROM FUTURE...Mirai Kara no Dengon...
7. White, the World, and the Heart
  白と世界と心... WHITE & WORLD & TRUE...Shiro to Sekai to Kokoro...
8. Firefly
  HO・TA・LU
9. Compass of Gold
  黄金のコンパス Ōgon no Konpasu
10. Aquarium of Night
  アクアリウムの夜 Akuariumu no Yoru
11. Dream Upon a Star
  星の見た夢 Hoshi no Mita Yume
12. For ever~
13. Adventures Surrounding the Skies
  空めぐる冒険 Sora Meguru Bōken
14. An Earth Within Your Eyes
  瞳の中の地球 Hitomi no Naka no Chikyū
15. To Your Sky
  君の空へ Kimi no Sora e

== Dragon Ball Z Complete Song Collection ==
Dragon Ball Z Complete Song Collection (ドラゴンボールZ コンプリート・ソングコレクション, Doragon Bōru Zetto Konpurīto Songu Korekushon) is a CD soundtrack box set, released in 2003. The collection is made up of four three-disc volumes that span the entire Hit Song Collection series vocal track library. The collection also includes songs from some of the video game soundtracks (mainly Ultimate Battle 22 and Legends) and rare tracks that prior to this release were only available as bonus tracks on the 8mm singles of the closing themes to movies 10–13. This set is quite sought after by the Dragon Ball fans who missed out on owning the individual albums in the Hit Song Collection series. However many fans have bought this set despite already owning all of the Hit Song Collection albums. Individuals that do not own the Hit Song Collection or this set still got a little something out of this collection if they already own the Great Complete Collection.

=== Dragon Ball Z Complete Song Collection 1: Journey of Light ===
Dragon Ball Z Complete Song Collection 1: Journey of Light

Box set by Various Artists
- Released: January 18, 2003
- Language: Japanese
- Label: Columbia
- Producer: Takashi Uchida

Dragon Ball Z Complete Song Collection 1: Journey of Light (ドラゴンボールZ コンプリート・ソングコレクション1~光の旅~, Doragon Bōru Zetto Konpurīto Songu Korekushon Wan~Hikari no Tabi~) is the first installment of the Dragon Ball Z Complete Song Collection. It was released on January 18, 2003. This set spans soundtracks 1-5 of the Hit Song Collection series and includes tracks from 8 1/2: Special.

Disc One:

1. CHA-LA HEAD-CHA-LA
2. ドラゴン・ワールドへようこそ!
  Doragon Wārudo e Yôkoso!/Welcome To The Dragon World!
3. ママは倖せ祈ってる
  Mama wa Shiawase Inotte 'ru/Mom is Wishing for Happiness
4. あいつは孫悟空
  Aitsu wa Son Gokū/He's That Damn Son Goku
5. 永遠の地球
  Eien no Chikyū/Earth of Eternity
6. 修羅色の戦士
  Shura-Iro no Senshi/Battle-Colored Warriors
7. 燃えろ!ドラゴン・ソルジャーズ
  Moero! Doragon Sorujāzu/Burn, Dragon Soldiers!
8. トラブル・サーフィン
  Toraburu Sāfin/Trouble Surfing
9. 天下一ゴハン
  Tenka-ichi Gohan/World's Greatest Gohan
10. ジョーシキなんてNA★I☆SA
  Jôshiki Nante NA*I*SA/No Common Sense At All
11. 大盛り悟空(ライス・ボーイ)
  Ômori Gohan (Raisu Boi)/A Big Serving of Gohan (Rice Boy)
12. 地球(ここ)から FROM THE HOME PLANET EARTH
  Koko Kara FROM THE HOME PLANET EARTH/From Here on Earth
13. 未来地図
  Mirai Chizu/Future Map
14. 天下無敵のフルコース
  Tenka-Muteki no Furukôsu/A Full Course Unrivaled on Earth
15. Fly high
16. ALL ALONE
17. 1♥(one heart)光年
  1 ♥ Kônen/One Heart Light-Year

Disc Two:

1. Dancing in the space
2. Cosmic Chinese Melody
3. Good night my Blue
4. Bad Boy
5. 嵐の前兆~無言のざわめき~
  Arashi no Zenchô~Mugon no Zawameki~/Sign of a Storm: Silent Noise
6. スペース・ダンス
  Supēsu Dansu/Space Dance
7. 戦(I・KU・SA)
  Ikusa (I-KU-SA)/Battle
8. ピッコロさんだ~いすき♡
  Pikkoro-san Da~isuki♡/I Lo~ve Mr. Piccolo♡
9. ソリッドステート・スカウター
  Soriddo Sutēto Sukautā/Solid State Scouter
10. お達者ポルカ
  O-tassha Poruka/The Healthy Polka
11. アサ・ヒル・ヨル・キミ・ボク
  Asa – Hiru – Yoru – Kimi – Boku/Morning – Daytime – Night – You – Me
12. 吹けよ風 呼べよ神龍(シェンロン)!!
  Fuke Yo Kaze Yobe Yo Shenron!!/Blow, Wind! Call Out, Shenlong!!
13. シャレれば命の泉わくわく!!
  Share 'reba Inochi no Izumi Waku-Waku!!/If I Tell a Joke, It's an Exciting Fountain of Life!!
14. 俺たちのエナジー
  Ore-tachi no Enajī/Energy of Ours
15. 心から濡れた二人
  Kokoro Kara Nureta Futari/Two Heartly Soaked People
16. 女の子は罪作り
  On'na no Ko wa Tsumitsukuri
  The Girl is Acting Cruelly
17. 摩訶不思議アドベンチャー!(ニュー・リミックス・ロング・ヴァージョン)
  Makafushigi Adobenchā! <Nyû Rimikkusu Rongu Vājon>/Mystical Adventure! <New Remix Long Version>

Disc Three:

1. ある星の詩★
  Aru Hoshi no Shi★/Poetry of a Certain Star★
2. Happy Birthday
3. CHA-LA HEAD-CHA-LA (スペース・ヴァージョン)
  CHA-LA HEAD-CHA-LA (Supēsu Vājon)/CHA-LA HEAD-CHA-LA (Space Version)
4. 金色た・ま・ご
  Kin-Iro Ta-ma-go/Gold-Colored Eggs
5. まるごと(ニュー・リミックス・ロング・ヴァージョン)
  Marugoto (Nyū Rimikkusu Rongu Vājon)/The Whole World (New Remix Long Version)
6. 蟻地獄
  Arijigoku/Doodlebug
7. 魂の道
  Tamashii no Michi/Path of Souls
8. ある星の詩★★
  Aru Hoshi no Shi★★/Poetry of a Certain Star★★
9. 光の旅
  Hikari no Tabi/Journey of Light
10. でてこいとびきりZENKAIパワー!
  Detekoi Tobikiri ZENKAI Pawā!/Come Out, Incredible ZENKAI Power!
11. 恋のNAZONAZO
  Koi no NAZONAZO/The Mysteries of Love
12. ドラゴン・ワールドへようこそ!(Super House Version)
  Doragon Wārudo e Yôkoso!«Super House Version»/Welcome to the Dragon World! «Super House Version»
13. Bad Boy (Super磨いてみてよVersion)
  Bad Boy (Super Migaite Mite Yo Version) / Bad Boy (Super Watch-Me-Polish-Them Version)
14. CHA-LA HEAD-CHA-LA (Super Adventure Version)
15. KAGEYAMA'S POWER MEDLEY (Ultra New Edition)

Medley Content:
15.KAGEYAMA'S POWER MEDLEY (Ultra New Edition):

- 修羅色の戦士
  - Shura-Iro no Senshi/Battle-Color of Warriors
- 「ヤ」なことには元気玉!!
  - "Ya" na Koto ni wa Genki Dama!!/There's a Genki-Dama in Bad Things!!
- あいつは孫悟空
  - Aitsu wa Son Gokū/He's That Damn Son Goku
- 魂の道
  - Tamashii no Michi/Path of Souls
- 「ヤ」なことには元気玉!!
  - "Ya" na Koto ni wa Genki Dama!!/There's a Genki-Dama in Bad Things!!
- 戦(I・KU・SA)
  - Ikusa (I-KU-SA)/Battle
- とびっきりの最強対最強
  - Tobikkiri no Saikyô tai Saikyô/Incredible Mightiest vs. Mightiest

=== Dragon Ball Z Complete Song Collection 2: Incredible Mightiest vs. Mightiest ===
Dragon Ball Z Complete Song Collection 2: Incredible Mightiest vs. Mightiest

Box set by Various Artists
- Released: February 21, 2003
- Language: Japanese
- Label: Columbia
- Producer: Takashi Uchida

Dragon Ball Z Complete Song Collection 2: Incredible Mightiest vs. Mightiest (ドラゴンボールZ コンプリート・ソングコレクション2~とびっきりの最強対最強~, Doragon Bōru Zetto Konpurīto Songu Korekushon Tzū~Tobikkiri no Saikyô tai Saikyô~) is the second installment of the Dragon Ball Z Complete Song Collection. It was released on February 21, 2003. This set spans soundtracks 6-10 of the Hit Song Collection series and includes tracks from 8 1/2: Special.

Disc One:

1. CHA-LA HEAD-CHA-LA
2. 「ヤ」なことには元気玉!!
  "Ya" na Koto ni wa Genki-Dama!!/There's a Genki-Dama in Bad Things!!
3. マイペース
  Mai Pēsu/My Pace
4. マイ・My・毎日
  Mai • My • Mainichi/Mai – My – Every Day
5. 機械の様に...-バトリング・マシン-
  Kikai no Yô ni...--Batoringu Mashin--/Like a Machine...: Battling Machine
6. 夢のかけら
  Yume no Kakera/Fragments of Dreams
7. ドラゴンONDO
  Doragon ONDO/Dragon March
8. 口笛の気持ち
  Kuchibue no Kimochi/The Feeling of Whistling
9. とびっきりの最強対最強
  Tobikkiri no Saikyô tai Saikyô/The Incredible Mightiest vs. Mightiest
10. パワー オブ スマイル
  Pawā obu Sumairu/Power of Smile
11. 目を閉じればカンタン
  Me o Tojireba Kantan/It's Easy If You Close Your Eyes
12. 風の様に 星の様に(パート1)
  Kaze no Yô ni Hoshi no Yô ni (Pāto Wan)/Like the Wind, Like the Stars (Part 1)
13. 風の様に 星の様に(パート2)
  Kaze no Yô ni Hoshi no Yô ni (Pāto Tzū)/Like the Wind, Like the Stars (Part 2)
14. だれかさんといい天気
  Dareka-san to Ii Tenki/Somebody and Good Weather
15. 時と光の下で
  Toki to Hikari no Shita de/Beneath Time and Light
16. ドラゴン マジック カーニバル
  Doragon Majikku Kānibaru/Dragon Magic Carnival

Disc Two:

1. Capsule Corp.
  Capsule Corporation
2. 一度は結婚したいマンボ
  Ichido wa Kekkon Shitai Manbo/The I-Want-to-Get-Married-For-Once Mambo
3. ベジータ様のお料理地獄!!~「お好み焼き」の巻~
  Bejīta-sama no O-ryôri Jigoku!!~"Okonomiyaki" no Kan~/Lord Vegeta's Cooking Hell!!: The "Okonomiyaki" Recipe
4. 想い出の天下一武道会
  Omoide no Tenkaichi Budôkai/Memories of The Tenkaichi Budôkai
5. シャレれば命の泉わくわく!!2
  Share 'reba Inochi no Izumi Waku-Waku!! Tzū/If I Tell a Joke, It's an Exciting Fountain of Life!! 2
6. 口笛の気持ち・ピッコロ編
  Kuchibue no Kimochi • Pikkoro Hen/The Feeling of Whistling: Piccolo Edit
7. イ・ケ・ナ・イうららマジック
  I•ke•na•i Urara Majikku/The Wrong Kind of Ooh-La-La Magic
8. Mind Power...気...
  Mind Power...Ki.../Mind Power...Energy...
9. Message From Future...未来からの伝言...
  Message From Future...Mirai Kara no Dengon.../A Message From the Future
10. Warning of Danger...警告...
  WARNING OF DANGER...Keikoku.../Warning of Danger...Warning...
11. Welcome Home, My Boy...風の名前...
  Welcome Home, My Boy...Kaze no Namae.../Welcome Home, My Boy...The Name of The Wind...
12. Super+Power=Melody...超力節...
  Super Purasu Power Ekuaruzu Melody...Chô-Ryoku Fushi.../Super Power Melody
13. It's a Small World
  It's a Small World...Koyubi no Shita de.../It's a Small World...Beneath My Little Finger...
14. Sweet Lovely Midnight...月の裏側...
  Sweet Lovely Midnight...Tsuki no Uragawa.../Sweet Lovely Midnight...the Other Side of the Moon...
15. White & World & True...白と世界と心...
  White & World & True...Shiro to Sekai to Kokoro/White, the World, and the Heart

Disc Three:

1. Hero (キミがヒーロー)
  Hero (Kimi ga Hīrō)/Hero (You're the Hero)
2. そんな気分で
  Son'na Kibun de/In That Sort of Mood
3. 流星図書館~コメットライブラリー~
  Ryūsei Toshokan~Kometto Raiburarî~/Comet Library
4. EなE
  E na E/Good E[nergy]
5. Keep my way
6. HO・TA・LU
  Firefly
7. イカしたエナジー
  Ikashita Enajī/Awesome Energy
8. でてこいとびきりZenkai パワー!(Ultra New Edition)
  Detekoi Tobikiri Zenkai Pawā!/Come Out, Incredible Zenkai Power! (Ultra New Edition)
9. Kuko's Dance Medley (Ultra New Edition)
10. 素直な光 優しい視線
  Sunao na Hikari Yasashī Shisen/Soft Light, Gentle Gaze
11. 光の旅'96 (Classical New Version)
  Hikari no Tabi '96 (Classical New Version)/Journey of Light '96 (Classical New Version)

Medley Content:
9. Kuko's Dance Medley (Ultra New Edition):

- ママは倖せ祈ってる
  - Mama wa Shiawase Inotte 'ru/Mom is Wishing for Happiness
- あいつは孫悟空
  - Aitsu wa Son Gokū/He's That Damn Son Goku
- Dancing in the space
- Cosmic Chinese Melody
- スペース・ダンス
  - Supēsu Dansu/Space Dance
- パワー・オブ・スマイル
  - Pawā obu Sumairu/Power of Smile

=== Dragon Ball Z Complete Song Collection 3: Fly Away! Hero ===
Dragon Ball Z Complete Song Collection 3: Fly Away! Hero

Box set by Various Artists
- Released: March 21, 2003
- Language: Japanese
- Label: Columbia
- Producer: Takashi Uchida

Dragon Ball Z Complete Song Collection 3: Fly Away, Hero! (ドラゴンボールZ コンプリート・ソングコレクション3 ~飛び出せ! ヒーロー~, Doragon Bōru Zetto Konpurīto Songu Korekushon Surī~Tobidase! Hīrō~) is the third installment of the Dragon Ball Z Complete Song Collection. It was released on March 21, 2003.This set spans soundtracks 11-15 of the Hit Song Collection series and includes tracks from 8 1/2: Special.

Disc One:

1. CHA-LA HEAD-CHA-LA
2. 催眠バナナ
  Saimin Banana
  Hypnosis Banana
3. Brain Dance
4. GIRIGIRI-世界極限-
  GIRI GIRI—Sekai Kyokugen--/At the Brink: The Earth's Limit
5. 黄金のコンパス
  Ôgon no Konpasu/Compass of Gold
6. VOICE
7. アクアリウムの夜
  Akuariumu no Yoru/Aquarium of Night
8. KOMA
  A Top
9. 星の見た夢
  Hoshi no Mita Yume/Dream Upon a Star
10. PLEASE~ISSHOU NO ONEGAI!
  Please: Wish of a Lifetime!
11. Delight to you...
12. LED TRAIN でGO!GO!GO!
  Go! Go! Go! on a Red Train
13. spacepeople DBZ
14. roller-through 55
15. Cool Cool ダンディ
  Cool Cool Dandi/Cool Cool Dandy
16. WILD DANCE NIGHT (夜明けまで突っ走れ)
  WILD DANCE NIGHT (Yoake Made Tsuppashire)/Wild Dance Night (Run at Full Speed Until Dawn)

Disc Two:

1. ハートブレイク・メロディ,みょうに
  Hātobureiku Merodi, Myô ni/Heartbreak Melody, For No Reason
2. でてこいとびきりZENKAIパワー!(Super House Version)
  Detekoi Tobikiri ZENKAI Pawā! (Super House Version)/Come Out, Incredible ZENKAI Power! (Super House Version)
3. 運命の日~魂vs魂~
  Unmei no Hi~Tamashii tai Tamashii~/Day of Destiny: Spirit vs. Spirit
4. I'm a positive girl!!
5. 夜明けの子供たち
  Yoake no Kodomo-tachi/Children of The Dawn
6. FOR EVER~
7. 挑戦状
  Chôsenjô/Challenge
8. イジワルしないでね...
  Ijiwaru Shinai De Ne.../Don't Be Mean...
9. 青い風のHOPE
  Aoi Kaze no HOPE/Blue Wind of Hope
10. バーニング・ファイト-熱戦・烈戦・超激戦-
  Bāningu Faito—Nessen – Ressen – Chôgekisen--/Burning Fight: a Close, Intense, Super-Fierce Battle
11. 水色星人
  Mizu-Iro Seinin/Water-Colored Aliens
12. 空めぐる冒険
  Sora Meguru Bôken/Adventures Surrounding The Skies
13. 何かが...(未知の力)
  Nanika ga... (Michi no Chikara)/Something is... (Road of Power)
14. ラブ・ジェット
  Rabu Jetto
  Love Jet
15. トリックスターと帰って来た未来
  Torikkusutā to Kaettekita Mirai
  The Future that Came Back With the Trickster
16. 僕は,まっすぐ 道は,まっすぐ
  Boku wa, Massugu Machi wa, Massugu/I'm Straight, the Road is Straight
17. マザー・ユニバース
  Mazā Yunibāsu/Mother Universe

Disc Three:

1. 飛び出せ!ヒーロー
  Tobidase! Hīrō/Fly Away! Hero
2. 私のMagician
  Watashi no Magician/Magician of Mine
3. 星のトライアングル
  Hoshi no Toraianguru/A Triangle of Stars
4. 空と雨と...
  Sora to Ame to.../The Sky, and Rain, and...
5. Jokeぐらい言わせろよ...
  Joke-Gurai Iwasero Yo.../I'm Only Joking!...
6. My song for you
7. 銀河を超えてライジング・ハイ
  Ginga o Koete Raijingu Hai/Surpassing the Galaxy, Rising High
8. 飛び出せ!ヒーロー(reprise)
  Tobidase! Hīrō (reprise)/Fly Away! Hero (reprise)
9. でてこいとびきりZENKAIパワー!
  Detekoi Tobikiri ZENKAI Pawā!!/Come Out, Incredible ZENKAI Power!!
10. CHA-LA HEAD-CHA-LA~JUNGLE FEVER MIX~
11. FOR EVER~'96~PIANO NEW VERSION~
12. GIRIGIRI-世界極限-~EXTREME HARD METAL MIX~
  GIRIGIRI—Sekai Kyokugen--~EXTREME HARD METAL MIX~/At the Brink: The Earth's Limit: Extreme Hard Metal Mix
13. PLEASE~ISSHOU NO ONEGAI!~ACID CLUB MIX~
  Please: Wish of a Lifetime!: Acid Club Mix
14. perfum N°18~DANGEROUS FRAGRANT MIX~
15. 銀河を超えてライジング・ハ~GALAXY ADVENTURE MIX~
  Ginga o Koete Raijingu Hai~GALAXY ADVENTURE MIX~/Surpassing the Galaxy, Rising High: Galaxy Adventure Mix
16. 飛び出せ!ヒーロー~DREAM THEATRE MIX~
  Tobidase! Hīrō (DREAM THEATRE MIX)/Fly Away! Hero (Dream Theatre Mix)

=== Dragon Ball Z Complete Song Collection 4: Promise of Eternity ===
Dragon Ball Z Complete Song Collection 4: Promise of Eternity

Box set by Various Artists
- Released: April 23, 2003
- Language: Japanese
- Label: Columbia
- Producer: Takashi Uchida

Dragon Ball Z Complete Song Collection 4: Promise of Eternity (ドラゴンボールZ コンプリート・ソング・コレクション4~永遠の約束~, Doragon Bōru Zetto Konpurīto Songu Korekushon Foru~Eien no Yakusoku~) is the final installment of the Dragon Ball Z Complete Song Collection. It was released on April 23, 2003. This set spans soundtracks 16-#18 1/2 of the Hit Song Collection series and includes vocal tracks from the soundtracks to the PlayStation video games and the bonus tracks up till now were only available on the 8mm CD singles of the closing theme to DBZ movies 10-13, plus three related songs from Akira Toriyama: The World making this volume quite sought after by many collectors.

Disc One:

1. We Gotta Power
2. Hey You, Crasher
3. Jumpin'Jump!!
4. 時よ止まれ~My Name Is Father~
  Toki Yo Tomare~My Name Is Father~/Stop, Time!: My Name is Father
5. 僕は魔法使い
  Boku wa Mahôtsukai/I'm a Magician
6. Fight Oh Fighting Road
7. ケ・セラ
  Ke Sera/Que Será (What Will Be)
8. あとはSilence...
  Ato wa Silence.../Afterward, There's Silence...
9. 力を超えて
  Chikara o Koete/Surpass Your Power
10. ジャンジャカMy Way
  Janjaka My Way/Bring it On My Way
11. This Is Life!
12. Good-Bye Mr. Loneliness~光の彼方へ~
  Good-Bye Mr. Loneliness~Hikari no Kanata e~/Goodbye, Mr. Loneliness: to the Other Side of the Light
13. 魔人ブウに捧げるバラッド
  Majin Buu ni Sasageru Baraddo
  A Ballad Dedicated to Majin Boo
14. 世紀末万歳!
  Seiki-Matsu Banzai!/Hooray For the End of the Century!
15. Hippy Hoppy Shake!!
16. Ossan's Dilemma
17. さらば涙よ
  Saraba Namida Yo/Goodbye, Tears!

Disc Two:

1. 昨日の夢,今日の光-サイレントナイト・モーニングムーン-
  Kinô no Yume, Kyô no Hikari—Sairento Naito – Môningu Mūn--/Yesterday's Dreams, Today's Light: Silent Night, Morning Moon
2. 100億のフレンズ
  100-Oku no Furenzu
  10,000,000,000 Friends
3. 魔人ブウの悲劇
  Majin Buu no Higeki
  Tragedy of Majin Boo
4. メモリーズ-奴のいない夜-
  Memorīzu—Yatsu no Inai Yoru--/Memories: An Evening Without Him
5. perfum N゜18~魔性の香り~
  perfum No 18 ~Mashô no Kaori~/Perfume No. 18: Diabolical Fragrance
6. 瞳の中の地球
  Hitomi no Naka no Chikyū/An Earth Within Your Eyes
7. Growin'Up いつかまた逢える日まで...
  Growin' Up Itsuka Mata Aeru Hi Made/Growin' Up: Until the Day We Can Meet Again
8. 僕達は天使だった
  Boku-tachi wa Tenshi Datta/We Use to be Angels
9. プラス・アルファ(+α)
  Purasu Arufa (+α)/Plus Alpha
10. ここにおいでよ
  Koko ni Oide Yo
  Come On Over Here!
11. 自然の合図
  Shizen no Aizu
  Signs of Nature
12. まるごと
  Marugoto
  The Whole World
13. Battle Spectacle Medley

Disc Three:

1. 奇蹟のビッグ・ファイト
  Kiseki no Biggu Faito/Big Fight of Miracals
2. ドラゴンボールの伝説
  Doragonbōru no Densetsu/Dragon Ball of Legend
3. ドラゴンパワー∞(むげんだい)
  Doragon Pawā ∞ (Mugendai)/Dragon Power ∞ (Infinity)
4. 小さな戦士(悟天とトランクスのテーマ)
  Chīsa na Senshi (Goten to Torankusu no Tēma)/The Young Warriors (Theme of Goten and Trunks)
5. 最強のフュージョン
  Saikyô no Fyūjon/Mightiest of Fusion
6. 愛はバラードのように(ベジータのテーマ)
  Ai wa Barādo no Yô ni (Bejīta no Tēma)/Love is Like a Ballad (Theme of Vegeta)
7. 俺がやらなきゃ誰がやる
  Ore ga Yaranakya Dare ga Yaru/If I Don't Do It, Who Will?
8. 勇者の笛(タピオンのテーマ)
  Yūsha no Fue (Tapion no Tēma)/Ocarina of The Brave Man (Theme of Tapion)
9. 永遠の約束(デュエット・ヴァージョン)
  Eien no Yakusoku (Dyuetto Vājon)/Promise of Eternity: (Duet Version)
10. 光の Willpower (ヴォーカル・ヴァージョン)
  Hikari no WILL POWER (Vōkaru Vājon)/Light of Willpower (Vocal Version)
11. 涙みたいな雨が降る
  Namida-Mitai na Ame ga Furu/The Rain That's Falling Looks Like Tears
12. 灼熱のファイティング(ヴォーカル・ヴァージョン)
  Endingu Tēma~Shakunetsu no Faitingu (Vōkaru Vājon)
  Ending Theme: Red-Hot Fighting (Vocal Version)
13. まひるの闇(ヴォーカル・ヴァージョン)
  Mahiru no Yami (Vōkaru Vājon)/Darkness of Midday (Vocal Version)
14. Sign ~兆~(ヴォーカル・ヴァージョン)
  SIGN ~Chô~ (Vōkaru Vājon)/Sign: An Omen (Vocal Version)
15. Fire of Black~黒い炎~(ヴォーカル・ヴァージョン)
  Fire of Black~Kuroi Honō~ (Vōkaru Vājon)/Fire of Black: Black Flame (Vocal Version)
16. Never Ending, Never Give Up (ヴォーカル・ヴァージョン)
  Never Ending, Never Give Up (Vōkaru Vājon)/Never Ending, Never Give Up (Vocal Version)
17. 君の空へ
  Kimi no Sora e/To Your Sky

Medley Content:
2. Battle Spectacle Medley:

- Mind Power-気-
  - Mind Power...Ki.../Mind Power...Energy...
- Warning of Danger-警告-
  - Warning of Danger...Keikoku.../Warning of Danger...Warning...
- 挑戦状
  - Chôsenjô/Challenge
- 運命の日-魂VS魂-
  - Unmei no Hi ~Tamashii VS Tamashii~/Day of Destiny: Spirit vs. Spirit
