= Cha-La Head-Cha-La =

1989 single by Hironobu Kageyama

Single by Hironobu Kageyama

from the album Dragon Ball Z Hit Song Collection
- A-side: "Cha-La Head-Cha-La"
- B-side: "Detekoi Tobikiri Zenkai Power!"
- Released: May 1, 1989
- Genre: Electronic rock
- Length: 3:17
- Label: Columbia
- Composer: Chiho Kiyooka
- Lyricist: Yukinojo Mori

Hironobu Kageyama singles chronology
"Saint Shinwa ~Soldier Dream~" (1988)	"Cha-La Head-Cha-La" (1989)	"Chōjin Sentai Jetman" (1991)

"Cha-La Head-Cha-La" (Japanese: チャラ・ヘッチャラ, Hepburn: Chara Hetchara) is a song by Japanese musician and composer Hironobu Kageyama, released as his sixteenth single. It is best known as the first opening theme song of the Dragon Ball Z anime television series. Columbia released the single on vinyl, cassette and mini CD on May 1, 1989. It is coupled with the first Dragon Ball Z closing theme, "Detekoi Tobikiri Zenkai Power!" (でてこいとびきりZENKAIパワー!, Detekoi Tobikiri Zenkai Pawā!) performed by Manna.

"Cha-La Head-Cha-La" opened the first 199 episodes of the television series and the first nine films of the film adaptations. The single has sold 1.7 million copies. It has been re-recorded in many other languages, with an English version performed by Kageyama himself that was released on his third greatest hits album entitled Hironobu Kageyama Best Album 3: Mixture in 1996.

== Background and recording ==
=== "Cha-La Head-Cha-La" ===
Hironobu Kageyama received the offer to record the opening theme song to Dragon Ball Z from the director of Columbia Records. With his background in a rock band, Kageyama said this director had previously revitalized his career by choosing him to sing the theme to Dengeki Sentai Changeman when he wanted a rock singer who could sing the upbeat theme songs that were being written for anime in increasing number in the 1980s. This director told Kageyama he would be singing the theme to Dragon Ball Z and wanted him involved from the earliest stage. Kageyama had been reading the Dragon Ball manga in Weekly Shōnen Jump for quite some time and was shocked when he was offered the job.

Kageyama and his band made a demo of the song that the singer described as American rock in the vein of Bon Jovi. But he was astonished when he heard Kenji Yamamoto's final arrangement, which was very different, and was initially unsure if it was even good. According to Kageyama, Yamamoto loved club music and incorporated elements of it in the song. He described the bass as bouncy and funky, and the guitar as being played more like a keyboard. Kageyama said, "At the time, mainstream rock music did not have that kind of sound, and there were no arrangers who could have made arrangements like that. I think the sound as well as the lyrics were quite innovative." However, he also said that there are elements familiar to the British rock he grew up listening to everywhere in the song.

Yukinojo Mori received the request to write the lyrics to the theme song from Columbia. He later speculated that they had probably heard the themes he had written for the Kinnikuman anime and knew his methods and approach to writing anime themes. Because of the music's complex chords and structures that can not be played with a single guitar, Mori sensed an atmosphere of progressive rock, which he is a fan of. The lyrics that gave the song its title of "Cha-La Head-Cha-La" are a combination of different Japanese phrases. The first "Cha-La" comes from "chara ni suru" (チャラにする) and means "to pretend nothing happened", while "Head-Cha-La" comes from "hetchara" (ヘッチャラ), which means "It's OK." Mori explained, "A lot of things might have happened in my life up until this point, but once I reset myself it all becomes OK and I'm ready to give things another shot. I tried to write lyrics that expressed that feeling while still rhyming. A lot of people say that emptying your head of thoughts makes you empty inside, but actually it's the opposite. It's a sort of punk attitude that means you can shake it off and empty your mind. It also means that no matter what happens, you're undefeatable.", "That's why we decided to write it as 'HEAD-CHA-LA'". When he first saw the lyrics, Kageyama initially thought it was a joke. But having known Mori since he was a teenager, the singer realized it was just the type of "crazy" thing he would do. He also said that, while most lyricists of the time prioritized showing off their own style through the lyrics, Mori prioritized the singer's enjoyment, "so his way of thinking was undoubtedly rock 'n roll. The thought that doing things that other people are already doing is dull and boring is pretty central to his character as a creator."

=== "Detekoi Tobikiri Zenkai Power!" ===
The single's B-side is "Detekoi Tobikiri Zenkai Power!", which is the first ending theme of Dragon Ball Z. Its composer, Takeshi Ike, had worked on the theme songs of the original Dragon Ball anime; "Makafushigi Adventure!" and "Romantic Ageru yo". Ike said he wanted to capture Dragon Ball's sense of mystery in the song and exude a "mystical kind of atmosphere". He also explained, "The opening [theme song] is usually flashy and dramatic, but you have more freedom in what the ending sounds like, so I thought it'd be fun if we made the song like something out of an amusement park." The track features an oriental feel and combines elements from pop, reggae, and several other styles. The lyrics were written by Naruhisa Arakawa, who was a screenwriter on the Dragon Ball anime, based on scat vocals that were added during the music's composition period. They worked with female singer Manna on how to best time the lyrics to draw out their uniqueness, added choir parts to give the words more impact, and used shouts and other elements to add more variety and color.

After Manna finished recording her vocals, Ike continued to add elements to "turn up the sense of wonder". Wanting a kind of chant that sounded like a magic spell at the beginning of the song, he added backmasked vocals inspired by the technique used to voice the aliens in the 1977 film Star Wars. "First I needed some words to start with, so I decided to record the names of the producers and staff who worked on the song. I recorded it on a 6mm tape and then just flipped it upside down and played it backwards through a 48-channel digital mixer, then pitched it up and added some effects. What I ended up with sounded like some kind of hypnotic, trance-like incantation."

== Reception ==
The single sold 1.7 million copies in Japan. After "Cha-La Head-Cha-La", Kageyama estimated that he went on to sing around 70 songs for the Dragon Ball franchise as of 2021. But he considers the first to be his best work as people are always happy when he sings it. "You could say that I'm not even an anime song singer, I'm literally the "CHA-LA HEAD-CHA-LA" singer! *laughs*" Arukara's 2016 song "Chaohan Music", which is an ending theme of Dragon Ball Super, pays tribute to "Detekoi Tobikiri Zenkai Power!" by including its own backmasked message.

== Track listing ==
No.	Title	Lyrics	Music	Arrangement	Length
1.	"Cha-La Head-Cha-La"	Yukinojo Mori	Chiho Kiyooka	Kenji Yamamoto	3:16
2.	"Detekoi Tobikiri Zenkai Power!" (でてこいとびきりZENKAIパワー! Detekoi Tobikiri Zenkai Pawā!, "Come Out, Incredible Zenkai Power!")	Naruhisa Arakawa	Takeshi Ike	Kenji Yamamoto	3:29

== 2005 recording ==
"Cha-La Head-Cha-La (2005 Ver.)"

Single by Hironobu Kageyama
- Released: August 3, 2005
- Genre: Electronic rock
- Length: 30:15
- Label: Team Entertainment/Sony
- Composer: Chiho Kiyooka
- Lyricist: Yukinojo Mori

Hironobu Kageyama singles chronology
"Ore wa Tokoton Tomaranai!!" (2005)	"Cha-La Head-Cha-La (2005 Ver.)" (2005)	"Eternal Love" (2006)

Kageyama recorded a new version of "Cha-La Head-Cha-La" that was released as a single on August 3, 2005, under the title "Cha-La Head-Cha-La (2005 Ver.)". This version features a completely different composition and is coupled with a new recording of "We Gotta Power", a different Dragon Ball Z theme that Kageyama performed. Various remixes of the two songs are also included. The single's cover art features characters from the anime. A "Self Cover" version of the single, featuring Kageyama as the cover art, was released as an iTunes exclusive; however, it omits one track, "Cha-La Head-Cha-La (Mobi[le-re]make Version)".

The 2005 version of the song peaked at number 118 on the Oricon Singles Chart and charted for two weeks. It served as the theme song of the video game Super Dragon Ball Z, which was released four months later.

=== Track listing ===
All lyrics are written by Yukinojo Mori.

No.	Title	Music	Arrangement	Length
1.	"Cha-La Head-Cha-La (2005 Ver.)"	Chiho Kiyooka	Kenji Yamamoto	4:12
2.	"We Gotta Power (2005 Ver.)"	Keiki Ishikawa	Kenji Yamamoto	3:50
3.	"Cha-La Head-Cha-La (DJ Dr. Knob Remix)"	Chiho Kiyooka	DJ Dr. Knob	5:06
4.	"We Gotta Power (Yuki Nakano Remix)"	Keiki Ishikawa	Yuki Nakano	4:40
5.	"Cha-La Head-Cha-La (Mobi[le-re]make Version)"	Chiho Kiyooka	Kenji Yamamoto	4:16
6.	"Cha-La Head-Cha-La (2005 Ver. Instrumental)"	Chiho Kiyooka	Kenji Yamamoto	4:12
7.	"We Gotta Power (2005 Ver. Instrumental)"	Keiki Ishikawa	Kenji Yamamoto	3:50

== Cover versions ==
Since its release, the song has been covered by many artists. In 2001, the Anipara Kids recorded a version for the album Club Ani para presents: Ani para Best & More. In 2004 the compilation album Anime Trance 2 features a version by Tora + R-SEQ. The 2005 Anime Speed compilation and the 2006 Speed Buyuden compilation feature a version by Lee Tairon.

The Italian band Highlord recorded a version that appears as a bonus track on the Japanese release of their album Instant Madness. The anime cover band Animetal recorded their take on "Cha-la Head-Cha-la". It first appeared on Animetal Marathon VII as part of the "Jump Into The Fire mini-Marathon" at the end of the disc. The Animetal version also appears on Animetal's 2006 "Decade of Bravehearts" Concert CD/DVD. In 2007 the compilation album Zakkuri! Paratech feature the song as part of a megamix performed by the 777BOYS. They would later team up with Pinpon and produce another version for J-Anime! Hyper Techno & Trance.

The anime adaptation of the yonkoma manga Lucky Star substitutes conventional ending theme-songs with parodies of famous anime songs, episode five of which was "Cha-La Head-Cha-La" sung by the lead character, Konata. This was done at the request of Aya Hirano, Konata's voice actress, who is said to be a great fan of Kageyama. The song was later released as a part of ending-song compilations CD for the show. In 2008 another version would be recorded by Black Steel on the compilation Hi-Speed Kirakira Jk. Visual kei rock band Screw covered the song for the cover album V-Rock Anime in 2012. Idol group Momoiro Clover Z included a cover of the song on their single "Z no Chikai", which is the theme song for the 2015 movie Dragon Ball Z: Resurrection 'F'.

=== Flow version ===
"Hero ~Kibō no Uta~ / Cha-La Head-Cha-La"

Single by Flow

from the album Flow the Max!!!
- Released: March 20, 2013
- Genre: Rock, electronic rock
- Label: Ki/oon
- Songwriters: Hero (Kibō no Uta): Flow, Takeshi Asakawa; Cha-La Head-Cha-La: Yukinojo Mori, Chiho Kiyooka

Flow singles chronology
"Brave Blue" (2012)	"Hero ~Kibō no Uta~ / Cha-La Head-Cha-La" (2013)	"Tokonatsu Endless" (2013)

"Hero ~Kibō no Uta~ / Cha-La Head-Cha-La" (HERO ~希望の歌~ / CHA-LA-HEAD-CHA-LA; "Hero -Song of Hope- / Cha-La Head-Cha-La") is the twentieth single by Japanese rock band Flow, released on March 20, 2013, as a double A-side. Both songs were created for use in the 2013 theatrical film Dragon Ball Z: Battle of Gods and included on Flow's eighth album Flow the Max!!!. "Hero ~Kibō no Uta~" is used as an insert song in the film, while the cover of "Cha-La Head-Cha-La" is used as its theme song. English-language versions of both songs were used in international releases of the film, with the English version of "Cha-La Head-Cha-La" included on the single as one of four B-sides. The other three are "Rising Dragon -DJ Dragon Remix-", a remix of a song from Flow's 2004 single "Go", and instrumental versions of the two A-sides.

Two versions of the single were released, each with different cover art; the standard edition features the members of the band drawn in a Dragon Ball-style, while the first press edition features characters from the film. When the two versions are lined up alongside the film's original soundtrack, the artwork from all three connect to form a single large image. The first press edition includes a special card for the card video game Dragon Ball Heroes.

"Hero ~Kibō no Uta~ / Cha-La Head-Cha-La" reached #24 on the Oricon Singles Chart and charted for five weeks. Flow's version of "Cha-La Head-Cha-La" went on to be used in the video games Dragon Ball Z: Battle of Z and Dragon Ball Xenoverse, as well as part of the Anisong & BGM Music Pack in Dragon Ball FighterZ, Dragon Ball Xenoverse 2, and Super Dragon Ball Heroes: World Mission.

No.	Title	Lyrics	Music	Length
1.	"Hero ~Kibō no Uta~" (HERO ~希望の歌~)	Flow	Takeshi Asakawa	3:37
2.	"Cha-La Head-Cha-La"	Yukinojo Mori	Chiho Kiyooka	3:20
3.	"Rising Dragon -DJ Dragon Remix-"	Kohshi, Keigo	Take	3:29
4.	"Cha-La Head-Cha-La -Official English Ver.-"	Yukinojo Mori, Joe Inoue, Chie Oishi	Chiho Kiyooka	3:22
5.	"Hero ~Kibō no Uta~ -Instrumental-" (HERO ～希望の歌～ -Instrumental-)		Takeshi Asakawa	3:36
6.	"Cha-La Head-Cha-La -Instrumental-"		Chiho Kiyooka	3:18
