= Seishunfu =

Single by Momoiro Clover Z

from the album Amaranthus
- A-side: "Seishunfu"
- B-side: "Hashire! (Z ver.)"
- Released: March 11, 2015
- Genre: J-pop
- Length: 5:16
- Label: Evil Line Records
- Songwriters: Shihori, N Kuwahara

Momoiro Clover Z singles chronology
"Yume no Ukiyo ni Saite Mi na" (2015)	"Seishunfu" (2015)	"„Z“ no Chikai" (2015)

Music video
- Momoiro Clover Z "Seishunfu" (Short Ver.) on YouTube

"Seishunfu" (青春賦) is the 14th single by the Japanese female idol group Momoiro Clover Z, released in Japan on March 11, 2015. It debuted at number 4 in the weekly Oricon singles chart.

An updated version from "Hashire!" (originally recorded in 2010, as of Momoiro Clover), was included for the single.

It served as the theme song for the movie about the group, Maku ga Agaru.

== Track listing ==
=== Limited Edition A ===
CD
No.	Title	Length
1.	"Seishunfu" (青春賦)
2.	"Hashire! (Z Ver.)" (走れ! -Z ver.-)
3.	"Yuku Haru Kuru Haru" (行く春来る春)
4.	"Seishunfu" (off vocal ver.) 青春賦（off vocal ver.）)
5.	"Hashire! (Z ver.)" (off vocal ver.) (走れ！-Z ver.-（off vocal ver.）)
6.	"Yuku Haru Kuru Haru" (off vocal ver.) (行く春来る春（off vocal ver.）)

Blu-ray Disc
No.	Title	Length
1.	"Seishunfu" (music video)

=== Limited Edition B ===
CD
No.	Title	Length
1.	"Seishunfu" (青春賦)
2.	"Hashire! (Z Ver.)" (走れ! -Z ver.-)
3.	"Link Link"
4.	"Seishunfu" (off vocal ver.) 青春賦（off vocal ver.）)
5.	"Hashire! (Z ver.)" (off vocal ver.) (走れ！-Z ver.-（off vocal ver.）)
6.	"Link Link" (off vocal ver.)

Blu-ray Disc
No.	Title	Length
1.	"Hashire! (Z ver.)" (music video)

=== Regular Edition ===
CD
No.	Title	Length
1.	"Seishunfu" (青春賦)
2.	"Hashire! (Z Ver.)" (走れ! -Z ver.-)
3.	"Yuku Haru Kuru Haru" (行く春来る春)
4.	"Link Link"
5.	"Seishunfu" (off vocal ver.) 青春賦（off vocal ver.）)
6.	"Hashire! (Z ver.)" (off vocal ver.) (走れ！-Z ver.-（off vocal ver.）)
7.	"Yuku Haru Kuru Haru" (off vocal ver.) (行く春来る春 (off vocal ver.）))
8.	"Link Link" (off vocal ver.)

== Charts ==
Chart (2015)	Peak position
Oricon Weekly Singles Chart	4
