= Maku ga Agaru =

- Poster
- Kanji: 幕が上がる
- Directed by: Katsuyuki Motohiro
- Screenplay by: Kōhei Kiyasu
- Based on: Maku ga Agaru (play) by Oriza Hirata
- Produced by: Reiko Katayama; Keichiiro Moriya
- Starring: Kanako Momota; Shiori Tamai; Ayaka Sasaki; Momoka Ariyasu; Reni Takagi
- Cinematography: Akira Sako
- Edited by: Yukako Kishino
- Music by: Yugo Kanno
- Production companies: Fuji Television; Robot Communications; Dentsu; Kodansha; Parco
- Distributed by: Toei Company
- Release date: February 28, 2015 (Japan)
- Running time: 119 minutes
- Country: Japan
- Language: Japanese
- Box office: ¥134.1 million (Japan)

Maku ga Agaru (Japanese: 幕が上がる; lit. 'The Curtain Rises') is a 2015 Japanese drama film, directed by Katsuyuki Motohiro and starring members of Japanese idol girl group Momoiro Clover Z. It is based on the debut novel of playwright Oriza Hirata of the same title and was released on February 28, 2015.

== Cast ==
- Kanako Momota
- Shiori Tamai
- Ayaka Sasaki
- Momoka Ariyasu
- Reni Takagi
- Haru Kuroki
- Tsuyoshi Muro

== Music ==
The theme song of the film is "Seishunfu" by Momoiro Clover Z.

== Reception ==
As of March 1, 2015, the film had earned ¥134.072 million at the Japanese box office.

== Other adaptations ==
=== 2015 stage play ===
The Momoiro Clover Z members reprised their roles in a stage adaptation performed in May 2015.

=== 2023 stage play ===
July 12–17, 2023, Sunshine Theater, Sunshine City, Tokyo

==== Cast ====
- Marie Morimoto (Hinatazaka46), as Saori (lead role)
- Haruyo Yamaguchi (Hinatazaka46), as Yukko (lead role)
