= Naite mo Iin Da yo =

- Limited edition cover

Single by Momoiro Clover Z

from the album Amaranthus
- B-side: "Doudou Heiwa Sengen"; "My Dear Fellow"
- Released: May 8, 2014
- Genre: J-pop
- Length: 5:08
- Label: Evil Line Records
- Songwriter: Miyuki Nakajima

Momoiro Clover Z singles chronology
"Gounn" (2013)	"Naite mo Iin Da yo" (2014)	"Moon Pride" (2014)

Music video
- Momoiro Clover Z "Naite mo Iin Da yo" on YouTube

"Naite mo Iin Da yo" (泣いてもいいんだよ; "It's Okay to Cry") is a song by Japanese pop-group Momoiro Clover Z, serving as their 11th single. It was released on May 8, 2014.

== Details ==
The single was released as a standard CD and a limited edition CD and DVD package. It was first previewed during the band's performances at their March 15 and 16, 2014, concerts at the National Olympic Stadium. At the time, only the title track, the theme song for the film Akumu-chan: The Movie, and only one of the B-sides "Dōdō Heiwa Sengen", theme song for the new The Great Shu Ra Ra Boom film, were revealed, with a third then unnamed track to be included on the standard edition only. The song was ultimately revealed to be "My Dear Fellow"; it was played at New York's Yankee Stadium for Masahiro Tanaka's warmup on April 10, 2014, and had been specially made for him when he joined the New York Yankees.

== Track listing ==
=== Limited edition ===
CD
No.	Title	Lyrics	Music	Length
1.	"Naite mo Iin Da yo" (泣いてもいいんだよ, "It's Okay to Cry")	Miyuki Nakajima	Miyuki Nakajima	5:08
2.	"Dōdō Heiwa Sengen" (堂々平和宣言, "Imposing Peace Declaration")	Chinza DOPENESS	MICHEL☆PUNCH/KEIZOmachine! from HIFANA/EVISBEATS
3.	"Naite mo Iin Da yo" (off vocal ver.)
4.	"Dōdō Heiwa Sengen" (off vocal ver.)

DVD
No.	Title	Length
1.	"Naite mo Iin Da yo" (Music Video)

=== Regular edition ===
CD
No.	Title	Lyrics	Music	Length
1.	"Naite mo Iin Da yo" (泣いてもいいんだよ, "It's Okay to Cry")	Nakajima	Miyuki Nakajima
2.	"Dōdō Heiwa Sengen" (堂々平和宣言, "Imposing Peace Declaration")	Chinza DOPENESS	MICHEL☆PUNCH/KEIZOmachine! from HIFANA/EVISBEATS
3.	"My Dear Fellow"	Takahiro Maeda	Shihori
4.	"Naite mo Iin Da yo" (off vocal ver.)
5.	"Dōdō Heiwa Sengen" (off vocal ver.)
6.	"My Dear Fellow" (off vocal ver.)
