= Gounn =

- Cover of the limited edition

Single by Momoiro Clover Z
- Released: November 6, 2013
- Genre: J-pop
- Length: 5:54
- Label: StarChild
- Songwriters: Natsumi Tadano, Shihori

Momoiro Clover Z singles chronology
| "Saraba, Itoshiki Kanashimitachi yo" (2012) | "Gounn" (2013) | "Naite mo Iinda yo" (2014) |

Music video
- Momoiro Clover Z "Gounn" on YouTube

"Gounn" (GOUNN) is the 10th single by the Japanese female idol group Momoiro Clover Z, released on November 6, 2013.

== Release details and philosophical reference ==
The single was released in two versions: a limited edition and a regular edition. The limited edition came with a DVD featuring the music video for the title track, but contains less songs on the CD in comparison to the regular CD-only edition. The tour of the same name (Momoiro Clover Z Japan Tour 2013 "Gounn") is being held from September 28.

"Gounn" refers to the 5 elements of humans' bodies and souls in Buddhist philosophy, the number 5 coincides with the total number of members in Momoiro Clover Z at the time.

== Track listing ==
=== Limited edition ===
CD
| No. | Title | Length |
|---|---|---|
| 1. | "Gounn" (GOUNN; lit. "The Five Elements of Human Beings") |
| 2. | "Itsuka Kimi ga" (いつか君が; lit. "What You Gave Some Time Ago") |
| 3. | "Gounn" (off vocal ver.) |
| 4. | "Itsuka Kimi ga" (off vocal ver.) |

DVD
| No. | Title | Length |
|---|---|---|
| 1. | "Gounn" (Music Video) |

=== Regular edition ===
CD
| No. | Title | Length |
|---|---|---|
| 1. | "Gounn" |
| 2. | "Itsuka Kimi ga" |
| 3. | "Momoiro Taiko Dodonga Bushi" (ももいろ太鼓どどんが節) |
| 4. | "Gounn" (off vocal ver.) |
| 5. | "Itsuka Kimi ga" (off vocal ver.) |
| 6. | "Momoiro Taiko Dodonga Bushi" (off vocal ver.) |

== Chart performance ==
| Chart (2013) | Peak position |
|---|---|
| Oricon Daily Singles Chart | 1 |
| Oricon Weekly Singles Chart | 2 |
