= Amaranthus (album) =

Album by Momoiro Clover Z

Studio album by Momoiro Clover Z
- Released: 17 February 2016 (Japan)
- Genres: J-pop; pop
- Length: 63:05
- Label: King

Momoiro Clover Z chronology
| Iriguchi no Nai Deguchi (2011) | Amaranthus (2016) |

Singles from Amaranthus
- 1. "Naite mo Iin Da yo" Released: 8 May 2014; 2. "Seishunfu" Released: 11 March 2015

Music video
- "We Are Born" on YouTube

Professional ratings
Review scores
| Source | Rating |
|---|---|
| Billboard Japan | Favorable |

Amaranthus (AMARANTHUS, Amaransasu) is the third studio album by the Japanese girl group Momoiro Clover Z, released in Japan on 17 February 2016.

It was released on the same day with the group's fourth album, Hakkin no Yoake. According to Oricon, Hakkin no Yoake sold 81,254 units in its first week and Amaranthus sold 80,783. The albums debuted at #1 and #2 in the Oricon weekly albums chart.

== Track listing ==
CD
| No. | Title | Length |
|---|---|---|
| 1. | "Embryo (Prologue)" (embryo -prologue-) | 1:30 |
| 2. | "We Are Born" (WE ARE BORN) | 4:20 |
| 3. | "Monoclo Dessan" (モノクロデッサン Monokuro Dessan) | 5:53 |
| 4. | "Gorilla Punch" (ゴリラパンチ Gorira Panchi) | 4:36 |
| 5. | "Buryōtōgen Nakayoshi Monogatari" (武陵桃源なかよし物語) | 4:29 |
| 6. | "Katte ni Kimi ni" (勝手に君に) | 4:45 |
| 7. | "Seishunfu" (青春賦) | 5:17 |
| 8. | "Saboten to Ribbon" (サボテンとリボン Saboten to Ribon) | 4:44 |
| 9. | "Demonstration" (デモンストレーション Demonsutorēshon) | 4:44 |
| 10. | "Bussōge" (仏桑花) | 4:38 |
| 11. | "Naite mo Iin Da yo" (泣いてもいいんだよ) | 5:06 |
| 12. | "Guns N' Diamond" | 4:05 |
| 13. | "Bye Bye de Sayōnara" (バイバイでさようなら Bai Bai de Sayōnara) | 4:43 |
| 14. | "Happy Re:birthday" (HAPPY Re:BIRTHDAY) | 4:15 |

Limited Edition Blu-ray
| No. | Title | Extra | Length |
|---|---|---|---|
| 1. | "We Are Born" (music video) | Full version included only on Limited editions. YouTube shortened the music video to 2:54 | 4:26 |
| 2. | "Monoclo Dessan" (documentary music video) |
| 3. | "Documentary of "Amaranthus"" |

== Charts ==
| Chart (2016) | Peak position | | |
|---|---|---|---|
| Chart (2016) | Peak position | Japan (Oricon Daily Albums Chart) | 1 |
| Japan (Oricon Weekly Albums Chart) | 2 | | |
