= List of Dragon Ball soundtracks =

This list contains known album titles from both Japanese and American releases of anime music from all iterations of the Dragon Ball franchise.

== TV series soundtracks ==
=== Dragon Ball: Music Collection (1986) ===
Dragon Ball: Music Collection

Soundtrack album by Various Artists
- Released: Vinyl (CX-7272); April 21, 1986; Cassette (CAY-782); April 21, 1986; CD (COCC-72015); September 25, 2003
- Length: 32:25
- Language: Japanese
- Label: Columbia
- Producer: Takashi Uchida

Dragon Ball: Music Collection (ドラゴンボール 音楽集, Doragon Bōru Ongakushū) is the official soundtrack of the Dragon Ball released by Columbia Records of Japan on April 21, 1986, on vinyl and cassette. To date, this is the only known soundtrack to have been released during the series' lifespan. The album was reissued through Columbia's ANIMEX 1200 Series on September 25, 2003, as its 15th release.

Track listing:

1. 摩訶不思議アドベンチャー!
  Makafushigi Adobenchā!/Mystical Adventure!
2. 旅立ち
  Tabidachi/Setting Out
3. 摩訶不思議アドベンチャー!
  Makafushigi Adobenchā!/Mystical Adventure!
4. セクシーギャル ブルマ
  Sekushī Gyaru Buruma/Sexy Girl Bulma
5. ドラゴンボールの謎
  Doragon Bōru no Nazo/Mystery of the Dragon Balls
6. ファンキー亀仙人
  Fankī Kame-Sen'nin/Funky Kame-Sen'nin
7. 大荒野
  Dai-Kôya/Great Wilderness
8. 妖怪出没
  Yôkai Shutsubotsu/Phantom Apparition
9. 野心
  Yashin/Ambition
10. 危険がいっぱい
  Kiken ga Ippai/Danger is Everywhere
11. 神龍出現
  Shenron Shutsugen/Shenlong Appears
12. ピラフとその部下
  Pirafu to Sono Buka/Pilaf and His Henchmen
13. 野生の少年
  Yasei no Shônen/Boy of The Wild
14. ロマンティックあげるよ
  Romantikku Ageru Yo/I'll Give You A Romantic Night

=== Dragon Ball: Hit Song Collection (1986) ===
Dragon Ball: Hit Song Collection

Greatest hits album
- Released: 1986

Dragon Ball: Hit Song Collection was released in 1986.

=== Dragon Ball: Nan Demo Hyakka (1986) ===
Dragon Ball: Nan Demo Hyakka

Soundtrack album by Various Artists
- Released: 1986

Dragon Ball: Nan Demo Hyakka was released in 1986.

=== Dragon Ball: Complete Song Collection (1987) ===
Dragon Ball: Complete Song Collection

Soundtrack album by Various Artists
- Released: 30CC-2063 (December 21, 1987); CAK-848 (December 1, 1988); COCC-9202 (October 21, 1991); COCC-14933 (March 21, 1998)
- Length: 59:00
- Language: Japanese
- Label: Columbia
- Producer: Takashi Uchida

Dragon Ball: Complete Song Collection (ドラゴンボール全曲集, Doragon Bōru Zenkyokushū) is the ninth album Dragon Ball and the eighth one to contain only songs from the series. Unlike the previous seven releases, it is the first one to contain all of the songs. The album was released on December 21, 1987, on CD by Columbia Records of Japan. It was later re-released on December 1, 1988, on cassette by near the end of the series' lifespan. It would be reissued again on CD on October 21, 1991, and on March 21, 1998.

Track listing:

1. 魔訶不思議アドベンチャー!
  Makafushigi Adobenchā!/Mystical Adventure!
2. ロマンティックあげるよ
  Romantikku Ageru yo/I'll Give You A Romantic Night
3. めざせ天下一
  Mezase Tenkaichi/Aim to Be the Greatest On Earth
4. ドラゴンボール伝説
  Doragon Bōru Densetsu/Dragon Ball Legend
5. Mr.ドリームを探せ
  Mr. Dorīmu o Sagase/Hunt for Mr. Dream
6. 青き旅人たち
  Aoki Tabibito-tachi/The Young Travelers
7. 不思議ワンダーランド
  Fushigi Wandārando/Mystery Wonderland
8. 武天老師の教え
  Muten Rôshi no Oshie/Teachings of Muten Roshi
9. 孫悟空ソング
  Son Gokū Songu/Son Goku Song
10. ウルフ・ハリケーン
  Urufu Harikēn/Wolf Hurricane
11. 風を感じて
  Kaze o Kanjite/Feel the Wind
12. 夢をおしえて
  Yume o Oshiete/Tell Me Your Dreams
13. レッドリボンアーミー
  Reddo Ribon Āmī/Red Ribbon Army
14. 初恋は雲にのって
  Hatsukoi wa Kumo ni Notte/Riding on a Cloud is My First Love
15. 燃えるハードで~レッドリボン軍をやっつけろ
  Moeru Hāto de~Reddo Ribon Gun o Yattsukero/With a Burning Heart: Defeat the Red Ribbon Army
16. 悟空のGOKIGENジャーニー
  Gokū no GOKIGEN Jānī/Happy Journey of Goku

==== 2003 reissue ====
Dragon Ball: Complete Song Collection

Soundtrack album by Various Artists
- Released: September 25, 2003
- Length: 63:05
- Label: Columbia JP
- Producer: Takashi Uchida

In 2003 Columbia reissued the Complete Song Collection with new licensed artwork and the Makafushigi Adventure! remix track, making the album's track list identical to disc one of the Great Complete Collection set.

Track listing:

1. 摩訶不思議アドベンチャー!
  Makafushigi Adobenchā/Mystical Adventure!
2. Mr.ドリームを探せ
  Mr. Dorīmu o Sagase/Hunt for Mr. Dream
3. 青き旅人たち
  Aoki Tabibito-tachi/The Blue Travelers
4. 不思議ワンダーランド
  Fushigi Wandārando/Mystery Wonderland
5. 武天老師の教え
  Muten Rôshi no Oshie/Teachings of Muten Rôshi
6. 孫悟空ソング
  Son Gokū Songu/Son Goku Song
7. ウルフハリケーン
  Urufu Harikēn/Wolf Hurricane
8. 風を感じて
  Kaze o Kanjite/Feel the Wind
9. めざせ天下一
  Mezase Tenka-ichi/Aim to Be the Greatest On Earth
10. 夢をおしえて
  Yume o Oshiete/Tell Me Your Dreams
11. レッド リボン アーミー
  Reddo Ribon Āmī/Red Ribbon Army
12. 初恋は雲にのって
  Hatsukoi wa Kumo ni Notte/Riding On A Cloud Is My First Love
13. 燃えるハートで~レッドリボン軍をやっつけろ~
  Moeru Hāto de~Reddo Ribon Gun o Yattsukero/With a Burning Heart: Defeat the Red Ribbon Army
14. 悟空のGOKIGENジャーニー
  Gokū no GOKIGEN Jānī/Happy Journey of Goku
15. ドラゴンボール伝説
  Doragon Bōru Densetsu/Dragon Ball Legend
16. ロマンティックあげるよ
  Romantikku Ageru yo/I'll Give You a Romantic Night
17. 摩訶不思議アドベンチャー!(ニュー・リミックス・ロング・ヴァージョン)
  Makafushigi Adobenchā (Nyū Rimikkusu Rongu Vājon)/Mystical Adventure (New Remix Long Version)

=== Dragon Ball Z Hit Song Collection series (1989–1996) ===
The Dragon Ball Z Hits Song Collection series is a long series of releases that spans 21 regular installments, as well as four mega collection volumes under the name of Dragon Ball Z Complete Song Collection.

=== Dragon Ball & Dragon Ball Z: Great Complete Collection (1994) ===
Dragon Ball & Dragon Ball Z: Great Complete Collection

Box set by Various Artists
- Released: April 1, 1994
- Length: Disc 1 63:05; Disc 2 71:17; Disc 3 67:19; Disc 4 60:77; Disc 5 72:69
- Language: Japanese
- Label: Columbia Records
- Producer: Takashi Uchida

Dragon Ball & Dragon Ball Z: Great Complete Collection (ドラゴンボール&ドラゴンボールZ 大全集, Doragon Bōru ando Doragon Bōru Zetto Daizenshū) is a five disc CD soundtrack set of Dragon Ball and Dragon Ball Z. It was released by Columbia on April 1, 1994, in Japan only.

Disc One: Dragon Ball Song Collection: ドラゴンボールソング・コレクション (Doragon Bōru Songu Korekushon)

1. 魔訶不思議アドベンチャー!
  Makafushigi Adobenchā!/Mystical Adventure!
2. Mr.ドリームを探せ
  Mr. Dorīmu o Sagase/Hunt for Mr. Dream
3. 青き旅人たち
  Aoki Tabibito-tachi/The Blue Travelers
4. 不思議ワンダーランド
  Fushigi Wandārando/Mystery Wonderland
5. 武天老師の教え
  Muten Rôshi no Oshie/The Teachings of Muten Roshi
6. 孫悟空ソング
  Son Gokū Songu/Son Goku Song
7. ウルフハリケーン
  Urufu Harikēn/Wolf Hurricane
8. 風を感じて
  Kaze o Kanjite/Feel the Wind
9. めざせ天下一
  Mezase Tenkaichi/Aim To Be The Greatest On Earth
10. 夢をおしえて
  Yume o Oshiete/Tell Me Your Dreams
11. レッドリボンアーミー
  Reddo Ribon Āmī/Red Ribbon Army
12. 初恋は雲にのって
  Hatsukoi wa Kumo ni Notte/Riding on a Cloud is My First Love
13. 燃えるハートで~レッドリボン軍をやっつけろ
  Moeru Hāto de~Reddo Ribon Gun o Yattsukero/With A Burning Heart: Defeat The Red Ribbon Army
14. 悟空のGOKIGENジャーニー
  Gokū no GOKIGEN Jānī/Happy Journey of Goku
15. ドラゴンボール伝説
  Doragon Bōru Densetsu/Dragon Ball Legend
16. ロマンティックあげるよ
  Romantikku Ageru Yo/I'll Give You A Romantic Night
17. 魔訶不思議アドベンチャー!(ニュー・リミックス・ロング・ヴァージョン)
  Makafushigi Adobenchā! (Nyū Rimikkusu Rongu Vājon) /Mystical Adventure (New Remix Long Version)

Disc Two: Dragon Ball BGM Collection: ドラゴンボールソング・コレクション (Doragon Bōru BGM Korekushon)

1. 魔訶不思議アドベンチャー! (TVサイズ)
  Makafushigi Adobenchā! (TV Saizu) /Mystical Adventure! (TV Size)
2. 旅立ち
  Tabidachi/Setting Out
3. 魔訶不思議アドベンチャー!(インストゥルメンタル)
  Makafushigi Adobenchâ! (Insuturumentaru)/Mystical Adventure! (Instrumental)
4. セクシーギャル・ブルマ
  Sekushī Gyaru Buruma/Sexy Girl Bulma
5. ドラゴンボールの謎
  Doragon Bōru no Nazo/Dragon Ball of Mystery
6. ファンキー亀仙人
  Fankī Kame-Sen'nin/Funky Kame-Sen'nin
7. 大荒野
  Dai-Kôya/Great Wilderness
8. 妖怪出没
  Yôkai Shutsubotsu/Phantom Apparition
9. 野心
  Yashin/Ambition
10. 危険がいっぱい
  Kiken ga Ippai/Danger is Everywhere
11. 神龍出現
  Shenron Shutsugen/Shenlong Appears
12. ピラフとその部下
  Pirafu to Sono Buka/Pilaf and His Henchmen
13. 野性の少年
  Yasei no Shônen/Boy of The Wild
14. 亀仙流のきびしい修業
  Kame-Sen Ryô no Kibishi Shūgyô/Strict Training School of Kame-Sen
15. 第二十一回天下一武道会
  Dai-Nijūikkai Tenkaichi Budôkai/The 21st Tenkaichi Budôkai
16. 赤いリボン
  Akai Ribon/Red Ribbon
17. 光るブルーの眼
  Hikaru Burū no Me/Shining Eyes of Blue
18. 殺し屋"桃白白"
  Koroshiya "Tao Paipai"/The Assassin "Tao Pai-Pai"
19. カリン塔のカリン様
  Karin-Tô no Karin-sama/Master Karin of Karin Tower
20. 第二十二回天下一武道会
  Dai-Nijūni-Kai Tenkaichi Budôkai/The 22nd Tenkaichi Budôkai
21. ピッコロ大魔王の恐怖
  Pikkoro-Daimaô no Kyôfu/The Terror of Piccolo-Daimaô
22. 亀仙人最後の魔封波
  Kame-Sen'nin Saigo no Mafūba/Kame-Sen'nin's Final Mafuba
23. 孫悟空の逆襲
  Son Gokū no Gyakushū/Counterattack of Son Goku
24. 波乱の天下一武道会
  Haran no Tenkaichi Budôkai/The Tumultuous Tenkaichi Budôkai
25. 因縁の対決!悟空とピッコロ
  In'nen no Taiketsu! Gokū to Pikkoro/The Fateful Confrontation! Goku and Piccolo
26. ドラゴンボールの贈り物
  Doragon Bōru no Okurimono/Gift of The Dragon Balls
27. ロマンティックあげるよ (TVサイズ)
  Romantikku Ageru Yo (TV Saizu) /I'll Give You A Romantic Night (TV Size)

Disc Three: Dragon Ball Z Song Collection: ドラゴンボールZソング・コレクション (Doragon Bōru Zetto Songu Korekushon)

1. CHA-LA HEAD-CHA-LA
2. あいつは孫悟空
  Aitsu wa Son Gokū/He's That Damn Son Goku
3. 燃えろ!ドラゴン・ソルジャーズ
  Moero! Doragon Sorujāzu/Burn, Dragon Soldier!
4. 天下一ゴバン
  Tenkaichi Gohan/World's Greatest Gohan
5. ピッコロさんだ~いすき♡
  Pikkoro-san Da~isuki♡/I Lo~ve Mr. Piccolo♡
6. 戦(I・KU・SA)
  Ikusa (I-KU-SA)/Battle
7. まるごと
  Marugoto/The Whole World
8. ソリッドステート・スカウター
  Soriddo Sutēto Sukautā/Solid State Scouter
9. 光の旅
  Hikari no Tabi/Journey of Light
10. 「ヤ」なことには元気玉!!
  "Ya" na Koto ni wa Genki-Dama!!/There's A Genki-Dama In Bad Things!!
11. とびっきりの最強対最強
  Tobikkiri no Saikyô tai Saikyô/The Incredible Mightiest vs. Mightiest
12. HERO(キミがヒーロー)
  HERO (Kimi ga Hīrō) /Hero (You're The Hero)
13. GIRIGIRI~世界極限
  GIRIGIRI—Sekai Kyokugen--/At the Brink: The Earth's Limit
14. 青い風のHOPE
  Aoi Kaze no HOPE/Blue Wind of Hope
15. バーニング・ファイト~熱戦・烈戦・超激戦
  Bāningu Faito—Nessen-Ressen-Chôgekisen--/Burning Fight: A Close, Intense, Super-Fierce Battle
16. でてこいとびきりZENKAIパワー!
  Detekoi Tobikiri ZENKAI Pawā!/Come Out, Incredible ZENKAI Power!
17. WE GOTTA POWER
18. 僕達は天使だった
  Boku-tachi wa Tenshi Datta/We Use To Be Angels

Disc Four: Dragon Ball Z BGM Collection: ドラゴンボールZソング・コレクション (Doragon Bōru Zetto BGM Korekushon)

1. CHA-LA HEAD-CHA-LA (TVサイズ)
  CHA-LA HEAD-CHA-LA (TV Saizu) /CHA-LA HEAD-CHA-LA (TV-Size)
2. プロローグ&サブタイトルI
  Purorōgu & Sabutaitoru Wan/Prologue & Subtitle I
3. かつてない恐怖
  Katsute Nai Kyôfu/A New Kind of Fear
4. あの世でファイト!
  Ano Yo de Faito!/Fight in the Afterlife!
5. 孫悟飯とピッコロ大魔王
  Son Gohan to Pikkoro Daimaō/Son Gohan & Great Demon King Piccolo
6. サイヤ人来たる!!
  Saiyajin Kitaru!!/Saiyans Arrive!!
7. 天下分け目の超決戦!!
  Tenka-Wakeme no Chô-Kessen!!/The Fateful Deciding Battle!!
8. 暗雲うずまくナメック星
  An'un Uzumaku Namekku-Sei/Dark Clouds Swirl over Planet Namek
9. 間にあえ!!ななつのドラゴンボール
  Ma ni Ae!! Nanatsu No Doragon Bōru/Reach the Seven Dragon Balls in Time!!
10. 恐怖のギニュー特戦隊
  Kyôfu no Ginyū Tokusentai/The Fearsome Ginyu Special Corps
11. 怪物フリーザVS伝説の超サイヤ人
  Kaibutsu Furîza VS Densetsu no Sūpā Saiyajin/The Monster Freeza vs. Super Saiyan of Legend
12. 消えるナメック星と希望
  Kieru Namekkusei to Kibô/Planet Namek, Along with Hope, Vanishes
13. 未来から来た少年
  Mirai Kara Kita Shônen/The Boy Who Came From The Future
14. 人造人間街へ...
  Jinzôningen Machi e.../To the City, Artificial Humans...
15. 阻止せよ!セルの完全体
  Soshi Seyo! Seru No Kanzentai/Prevent It! Cell's Perfect Form
16. 死を呼ぶセルゲーム
  Shi o Yobu Seru Gêmu/The Death-Summoning Cell Games
17. 大団円~もうひとつの結末
  Daidan'en~Mô Hitotsu Ketsumatsu/The Finale: One More Ending
18. さよなら戦士たち
  Sayonara Senshi-tachi/Farewell, Warriors
19. でてこいとびきりZENKAIパワー! (TVサイズ)
  Detekoi Tobikiri ZENKAI Pawā! (TV Saizu) /Come Out, Incredible ZENKAI Power! (TV-Size)
20. WE GOTTA POWER (TVサイズ)
  WE GOTTA POWER (TV Saizu) /We Gotta Power (TV-Size)
21. プロローグ&サブタイトルII
  Purorōgu & Sabutaitoru Tzū/Prologue & Subtitle II
22. ニューヒーロー登場
  Nyū Hīrō Tanjô/A New Hero is Born
23. ANGEL
24. 再開!天下一武道会
  Saikai! Tenkaichi Budôkai/Reconvene! The Tenkaichi Budôkai
25. 正義を愛する者!
  Seigi o Ai Suru Mono!/Those Who Love Justice!
26. 僕達は天使だった (TVサイズ)
  Bokutachi wa Tenshi Datta (TV Saizu) /We Use To Be Angels (TV-Size)

Disc Five: Theatrical Dragon Ball, Dragon Ball Z BGM Collection: 劇場版ドラゴンボール・ドラゴンボールZ・ソング・コレクション (Gekijô ban Doragon Bōru DoragonbōruZetto BGM Korekushon)

1. 魔訶不思議アドベンチャー! (TVサイズ・インストゥルメンタル)
  Makafushigi Adobenchā! (TV Saizu Insuturumentaru) /Mystical Adventure! (TV Size Instrumental)
2. 神龍の伝説
  Shenron no Densetsu/Legend of Shenlong
3. 魔神城のねむり姫
  Majin-Jô no Nemuri Hime/The Sleeping Princess in the Devil's Castle
4. 魔訶不思議大冒険
  Makafushigi Dai-Bôken/Mystical Great Adventure
5. ロマンティックあげるよ (TVサイズ・インストゥルメンタル)
  Romantikku Ageru Yo (TV Saizu Insuturumentaru) /I'll Give You a Romantic Night (TV-Size Instrumental)
6. CHA-LA HEAD-CHA-LA(インストゥルメンタル)
  CHA-LA HEAD-CHA-LA (Insuturumentaru)/CHA-LA HEAD-CHA-LA (Instrumental)
7. ドラゴンボールZ
  Doragon Bōru Zetto/Dragon Ball Z
8. この世で一番強いヤツ
  Kono Yo de Ichiban Tsuyoi Yatsu/The World's Strongest Guy
9. 地球まるごと超決戦
  Chikyū Marugoto Chô-Kessen/Super Deciding Battle for the Entire Planet Earth
10. 超サイヤ人だ孫悟空
  Sūpā Saiyajin Da Son Gokū/Son Goku the Super Saiyan
11. とびっきりの最強対最強
  Tobikkiri no Saikyô tai Saikyô/The Incredible Mightiest vs. Mightiest
12. 激突!!100億パワーの戦士たち
  Gekitotsu!! 100-Oku Pawā no Senshi-tachi/Clash!! 100,000,000 Powerful Warriors
13. 極限バトル!!三大超サイヤ人
  Kyokugen Batoru!! San Dai Sūpā Saiyajin/Extreme Battle!! The Three Great Super Saiyans
14. 燃えつき炉ろ!!熱戦・烈戦・超激戦
  Moetsukiro!! Nessen - Retsu Sen - Chô-Gekisen/Burn Up!! A Close, Intense, Super-Fierce Battle
15. 銀河ギリギリ!!ぶっちぎりの凄い奴
  Ginga Giri-Giri!! Bucchigiri no Sugoi Yatsu/The Galaxy at the Brink!! The Super Incredible Guy
16. 銀河を超えてライジング・ハイ
  Ginga o Koete Raijingu Hai/Surpassing the Galaxy, Rising High

=== Dragon Ball: Original USA TV Soundtrack Recording (1995) ===
Dragon Ball: Original USA TV Soundtrack Recording

Soundtrack album by Peter Berring
- Released: December 9, 1997
- Recorded: 1995, Vancouver, British Columbia
- Length: 50:03
- Labels: FUNimation Productions Inc. Super Tracks Music Group International
- Producers: John J. Alcantar III; Thomas C. Stewart

Dragon Ball: Original USA TV Soundtrack Recording is the official US soundtrack Dragon Ball. It was recorded in 1995 and released in album form two years later during 1997, along with Saban's English dub soundtrack for Dragon Ball Z. The score was written and composed by Vancouver-based musician Peter Berring, who was hired by the dub's producer Funimation. It includes the theme song known by fans as "Gotta Find That Dragon Ball!" which was written by Brian Griffith. It is the only US soundtrack of the show to be produced for the consumer.

Track listing:

1. Main Title
2. The Game Begins
3. Bulma and Goku
4. Oolong the Terrible
5. Yamcha the Warrior
6. Disappearing Dragon Balls
7. Power of the Master
8. The Emperor's Prize
9. Awaken the Dragon
10. The Awakening Dragon
11. Goku's Curse
12. Victory
13. End Title

=== Dragon Ball Z: Original USA Television Soundtrack (1996) ===
Dragon Ball Z: Original USA Television Soundtrack

Soundtrack album by Ron Wasserman
- Released: December 7, 1997
- Recorded: 1996, Los Angeles
- Length: 58:51
- Language: English
- Labels: Funimation Productions Inc. Super Tracks Music Group International

Dragon Ball Z: Original USA Television Soundtrack is the first US domestic soundtrack for Dragon Ball Z, released on December 7, 1997. It features 12 tracks of music from Saban Entertainment's soundtrack for the Saiyan arc. All of the music (excluding the opening and closing themes) was written and performed by Ron Wasserman during 1996 at his home in Los Angeles, although Shuki Levy and Kussa Mahehi (Haim Saban) were credited on the album for contractual reasons.

Jason Ankeny of AllMusic gave this soundtrack 2.5 stars out of 5.

Track listing:

1. Main Title
2. The Arrival of Raditz
3. The World's Strongest Team
4. Gohan's Hidden Powers
5. Goku's Unusual Journey
6. Gohan's Metamorphosis
7. Gohan Makes a Friend
8. Trouble on Arlia
9. Home for Infinite Losers
10. Princess Snake's Hospitality
11. Escape from Piccolo
12. End Title

=== Dragon Ball Z: Best Song Collection "Legend of Dragonworld" (2006) ===
Dragon Ball Z: Best Song Collection "Legend of Dragonworld"

Greatest hits album by Various Artists
- Released: February 22, 2006
- Language: Japanese
- Label: Columbia
- Producer: Takashi Uchida

Dragon Ball Z: Best Song Collection "Legend of Dragonworld" (ドラゴンボールZ ベスト ソング コレクション "LEGEND OF DRAGONWORLD", Doragon Bōru Zetto Besuto Songu Korekushon "LEGEND OF DRAGONWORLD") is a two disc CD soundtrack, released by Columbia on February 22, 2006, in Japan only. Among the list of theme and image songs on this set, it also contains very popular image songs from the Hit Song Collection Series as well.

It peaked at number 197 on the Japanese Albums Chart.

Disc One:

1. CHA-LA HEAD-CHA-LA
2. でてこいとびきりZENKAIパワー!
  Detekoi Tobikiri ZENKAI Pawā!/Come Out, Incredible ZENKAI Power!
3. まるごと
  Marugoto/The Whole World
4. 永遠の地球
  Eien no Chikyū/Earth of Eternity
5. あいつは孫悟空
  Aitsu wa Son Gokū/He's That Damn Son Goku
6. Dancing in the space
7. 戦(I・KU・SA)
  Ikusa (I-KU-SA)/Battle
8. 光の旅
  Hikari no Tabi/Journey of Light
9. 「ヤ」なことには元気玉!!
  "Ya" na Koto ni wa Genki-Dama!!/There's a Genki-Dama in Bad Things!!
10. とびっきりの最強対最強
  Tobikkiri no Saikyô tai Saikyô/The Incredible Mightiest vs. Mightiest
11. パワー オブ スマイル
  Pawā obu Sumairu/Power of Smile
12. MIND POWER...気...
  MIND POWER...Ki.../Mind Power...Energy...
13. MESSAGE FROM FUTURE...未来からの伝言...
  MESSAGE FROM FUTURE...Mirai Kara no Dengon.../A Message From the Future
14. WHITE&WORLD&TRUE...白と世界と心...
  WHITE & WORLD & TRUE...Shiro to Sekai to Kokoro.../White, the World, and the Heart
15. HERO(キミがヒーロー)
  HERO (Kimi ga Hīrō)/Hero (You're the Hero)
16. Brain Dance
17. GIRIGIRI-世界極限-
  GIRI GIRI—Sekai Kyokugen--/At the Brink: The Earth's Limit

Disc Two:

1. 黄金のコンパス
  Ôgon no Konpasu/Compass of Gold
2. アクアリウムの夜
  Akuariumu no Yoru/Aquarium of Night
3. Cool Cool ダンディ
  Cool Cool Dandi/Cool Cool Dandy
4. 運命の日~魂VS魂~
  Unmei no Hi~Tamashii VS Tamashii~/Day of Destiny: Spirit vs. Spirit
5. 夜明けの子供たち
  Yoake no Kodomo-tachi/Children of the Dawn
6. FOR EVER~
7. 青い風のHOPE
  Aoi Kaze no HOPE/Blue Wind of Hope
8. バーニング・ファイト-熱戦・烈戦・超激戦-
  Bāningu Faito—Nessen-Ressen-Chôgekisen--/Burning Fight: a Close, Intense, Super-Fierce Battle
9. 銀河を超えてライジング・ハイ
  Ginga o Koete Raijingu Hai/Surpassing the Galaxy, Rising High
10. 飛び出せ!ヒーロー
  Tobidase! Hīrō/Fly Away, Hero!
11. WE GOTTA POWER
12. 君の空へ
  Kimi no Sora e/To Your Sky
13. 奇蹟のビッグ・ファイト
  Kiseki no Biggu Faito
  The Miraculous Big Fight
14. ドラゴンパワー∞(むげんだい)
  Doragon Pawā Mugendai/Dragon Power Infinity
15. 最強のフュージョン
  Saikyô no Fyūjon/Mightiest of Fusion
16. 俺がやらなきゃ誰がやる
  Ore ga Yaranakya Dare ga Yaru/If I Don't Do It, Who Will?
17. 僕達は天使だった
  Boku-tachi wa Tenshi Datta/We Use to be Angels

=== Dragon Ball Z: BGM Collection (2006) ===
Dragon Ball Z: BGM Collection

Soundtrack album by Shunsuke Kikuchi
- Released: February 22, 2006
- Length: Disc 1 69:28; Disc 2 69:87; Disc 3 72:39
- Language: Japanese
- Label: Columbia
- Producer: Takashi Uchida

Dragon Ball Z: BGM Collection (ドラゴンボールZ BGMコレクション, Doragon Bōru Zetto BGM Korekushon) is a three disc CD soundtrack set of the BGM (background music) from Dragon Ball Z done by series composer Shunsuke Kikuchi. It was released by Columbia Records on February 22, 2006, in Japan only. This set features the background music and theme songs found in the five disc Dragon Ball & Dragon Ball Z: Great Complete Collection set as well some background music and theme song produced for the later part of the TV series and movies 10-13 that came after the Great Complete Collection was released.

Disc One:

1. CHA-LA HEAD-CHA-LA (TVサイズ)
  CHA-LA HEAD-CHA-LA (TV Saizu)/CHA-LA HEAD-CHA-LA (TV Size)
2. プロローグ&サブタイトル1
  Purorōgu & Sabutaitoru wan/Prologue & Subtitle 1
3. かつてない恐怖
  Katsutenai Kyôfu/Fear Unfelt Before
4. あの世でファイト!
  Ano yo de Faito!/Fight on in the Other World!
5. 孫悟飯とピッコロ大魔王
  Son Gohan to Pikkoro Daimaô/Son Gohan and Demon King Piccolo
6. CHA-LA HEAD-CHA-LA (Variations)
7. ブリッジ・コレクション
  Burijji Korekushon/Bridge Collection
8. サイヤ人来たる!!
  Saiyajin Kitaru!!/Saiyans are Coming!!
9. 天下分け目の超決戦!!
  Tenka Wakeme no Chô Kessen!!/Super Deciding Battle to Divide Heaven from Earth!!
10. 悟飯のテーマ
  Gohan no Theme/Theme of Gohan
11. 嗚呼,修行の日々
  Ah, Shugyô no Hibi/Alas, the Days of Training
12. 暗雲うずまくナメック星
  An'un Uzumaku Namekku Hoshi/Dark Clouds Swirling Over Namek Star
13. 間にあえ!!ななつのドラゴンボール
  Mani Ae!! Nanatsu no Dragonbōru/Make it in Time!! The Seven Dragon Balls
14. 恐怖のギニュー特戦隊
  Kyôfu no Ginyū Tokusentai/The Fearsome Ginyu Special Task Force
15. 怪物フリーザVS伝説の超サイヤ人
  Kaibutsu Furīza Vs. Densetsu no Sūpā Saiyajin/The Monster Freeza Vs. the Super Saiyan of Legend
16. 消えるナメック星と希望
  Kieru Namekku Hoshi to Kibô/Namek Star and Hope Vanish
17. でてこい とびきりZENKAIパワー! (TVサイズ)
  Detekoi Tobikiri ZENKAI Pawā! (TV Saizu)/Come Out, Incredible ZENKAI Power! (TV Size)
18. [劇場版ドラゴンボールZ SUITS] DRAGON BALL Z
  [Gekijô ban Doragon Bōru Zetto SUITS] DRAGON BALL Z /[Theatrical Dragon Ball Z Suites] Dragon Ball Z
19. [劇場版ドラゴンボールZ SUITS]この世で一番強いヤツ
  [Gekijô ban Doragon Bōru Zetto SUITS] Kono yo de Ichiban Tsuyoi Yatsu/[Theatrical Dragon Ball Z Suites] The Strongest in This World
20. 戦(I・KU・SA) (MOVIEサイズ)
  Ikusa (I-KU-SA) (Movie Saizu)/Battle (Movie Size)
21. [劇場版ドラゴンボールZ SUITS]地球まるごと超決戦
  [Gekijô ban Doragon Bōru Zetto SUITS] Chikyū Marugoto Chô Kessen/[Theatrical Dragon Ball Z Suites] Super Deciding Battle for the Whole Earth
22. まるごと (MOVIEサイズ)
  Marugoto (Movie Saizu)/The Whole World (Movie Size)
23. [劇場版ドラゴンボールZ SUITS]超(スーパー)サイヤ人だ孫悟空
  [Gekijô ban Doragon Bōru Zetto SUITS] Chô Saiyajin da Son Gokū/[Theatrical Dragon Ball Z Suites] Son Goku the Super Saiyan
24. 「ヤ」なことには元気玉!! (MOVIEサイズ)
  "Ya" na Koto ni wa Genki-Dama!! (Movie Saizu)/There's A Genki-Dama In Bad Things!! (Movie Size)
25. [劇場版ドラゴンボールZ SUITS]とびっきりの最強対最強
  [Gekijô ban Doragon Bōru Zetto SUITS] Tobikkiri no Saikyô tai Saikyô/[Theatrical Dragon Ball Z Suites] The Incredible Mightiest vs. Mightiest
26. とびっきりの最強対最強 (MOVIEサイズ)
  Tobikkiri no Saikyô tai Saikyô (Movie Saizu)/The Incredible Mightiest vs. Mightiest (Movie Size)

Disc Two:

1. CHA-LA HEAD-CHA-LA(インストゥルメンタル)
  CHA-LA HEAD-CHA-LA (Insuturumentaru)/CHA-LA HEAD-CHA-LA (Instrumental)
2. 未来からきた少年
  Mirai Karakita Shônen/The Boy from the Future
3. 人造人間 街へ...
  Jinzôningen Machi e.../The Artificial Humans go to Town
4. 阻止せよ!セルの完全体
  Soshise Yo! Seru no Kanzen Karada/Prevent It! Cell's Perfect Body
5. 死を呼ぶセルゲーム
  Shi wo Yobu Seru Gēmu/The Cell Game Which Calls Forth Death
6. 大団円~もうひとつの結末
  Ōdan'en~Mô Hitotsu no Ketsumatsu/All's Well That Ends Well: One More Conclusion
7. さよなら戦士たち
  Sayonara Senshi-tachi/Goodbye Warriors
8. [劇場版ドラゴンボールZ SUITS]激突!!100億パワーの戦士たち
  [Gekijô ban Doragon Bōru Zetto SUITS] Gekitotsu!! 100 Oku Pawā no Senshi-tachi/[THEATRICAL DRAGON BALL Z SUITES] Clash! 10 Billion Power Warriors
9. HERO(キミがヒーロー) (MOVIEサイズ)
  HERO (Kimi ga Hīrō) (Movie Saizu)/Hero (You're The Hero) (Movie Size)
10. [劇場版ドラゴンボールZ SUITS]極限バトル!!三大超サイヤ人
  [Gekijô ban Doragon Bōru Zetto SUITS] Kyokugen Batoru!! Sandai Sūpā Saiyajin/[THEATRICAL DRAGON BALL Z SUITES] Extreme Battle!! The Three Super Saiyans
11. GIRIGIRI-世界極限- (MOVIEサイズ)
  GIRIGIRI—Sekai Kyokugen-- (Movie Saizu)/At the Brink: The Earth's Limit (Movie Size)
12. [劇場版ドラゴンボールZ SUITS]燃えつきろ!!熱戦・烈戦・超激戦
  [Gekijô ban Doragon Bōru Zetto SUITS] Moe Tsukiro!! Nessen, Retsusen, Chôgekisen/[THEATRICAL DRAGON BALL Z SUITES] Burn Up!! Hot, Fierce, Super Violent Fight
13. バーニング・ファイト-熱戦・烈戦・超激戦- (MOVIEサイズ)
  Bāningu Faito—Nessen-Ressen-Chôgekisen-- (Movie Saizu)/Burning Fight: A Close, Intense, Super-Fierce Battle (Movie Size)
14. [劇場版ドラゴンボールZ SUITS]銀河ギリギリ!!ぶっちぎりの凄い奴
  [Gekijô ban Doragon Bōru Zetto SUITS] Ginga GiriGiri!! Bucchigiri no Sugoi Yatsu/[THEATRICAL DRAGON BALL Z SUITES] The Galaxy Last Moment!! A Phenomenally Awesome Guy
15. 銀河を超えてライジング・ハイ (MOVIEサイズ)
  Ginga wo Koete, Rising High (Movie Saizu)/Surpass the Galaxy, Rising High (Movie Size)

Disc Three:

1. WE GOTTA POWER (TVサイズ)
  WE GOTTA POWER (TV Saizu)/We Gotta Power (TV Size)
2. プロローグ&サブタイトル2
  Purorōgu & Sabutaitoru Tzū/Prologue & Subtitle 2
3. ニューヒーロー登場
  New Hero Tôjô/Enter a New Hero
4. Angel
5. 再開!天下一武道会
  Saikai! Tenkaichi Budôkai/Reunion! Tenkaichi Budokai
6. WE GOTTA POWER(インストゥルメンタル)
  WE GOTTA POWER (Insuturumentaru)/We Gotta Power (Instrumental)
7. 僕達は天使だった(インストゥルメンタル)
  Boku-tachi wa Tenshi Datta (Insuturumentaru)/We Were Angels (Instrumental)
8. 戦いの時,ふたたび
  Tatakai no Toki Futatabi/The Time for Battle is Here Again
9. 明日を信じて...
  Ashita wo Shinjite.../Believe in Tomorrow...
10. やっぱり最強孫悟空!!
  Yappari Saikyô Son Gokū!!/Son Goku is the Strongest After all!
11. 僕達は天使だった (TVサイズ)(影山ヒロノブ)
  Boku-tachi wa Tenshi Datta (TV Saizu)/We Were Angels (TV Size)
12. [劇場版ドラゴンボールZ SUITS]危険なふたり!超(スーパー)戦士はねむれない
  [Gekijô ban DoragonbōruZetto SUITS] Kiken na Futari!! Sūpā Senshi Hanemurenai/[THEATRICAL DRAGON BALL Z SUITES] Danger!! The Super Warrior Can't Rest
13. 奇蹟のビッグ・ファイト (MOVIEサイズ)
  Kiseki no Biggu Faito (Movie Saizu)/Astounding Big Fight (Movie Size)
14. [劇場版ドラゴンボールZ SUITS]超(スーパー)戦士撃破!!勝つのはオレだ
  [Gekijô ban Doragon Bōru Zetto SUITS] Sūpā Senshi Gekiha!! Katsu no wa Ore da/[THEATRICAL DRAGON BALL Z SUITES] Super Warriors Crushed!! I'll Be the Winner
15. ドラゴンパワー∞(むげんだい) (MOVIEサイズ)
  Doragon Pawā Mugendai (Movie Saizu)/Dragon Power Infinite (Movie Size)
16. [劇場版ドラゴンボールZ SUITS]復活のフュージョン!!悟空とベジータ
  [Gekijô ban Doragon Bōru Zetto SUITS] Fukkatsu no Fyūshon!! Gokū to Bejīta/[THEATRICAL DRAGON BALL Z SUITES] Rebirth of the Fusion!! Goku and Vegeta
17. 最強のフュージョン (MOVIEサイズ)
  Saikyô no Fyūshon (Movie Size)/The Strongest Fusion (Movie Size)
18. [劇場版ドラゴンボールZ SUITS]龍拳爆発!!悟空がやらねば誰がやる
  [Gekijô ban Doragon Bōru Zetto SUITS] Ryūken Bakuhatsu!! Gokū ga Yaraneba Darega Yaru/[THEATRICAL DRAGON BALL Z SUITES] Ryuken Explosion!! If Goku Doesn't do it, Who Will
19. 俺がやらなきゃ誰がやる (MOVIEサイズ)
  Ore ga Yaranakya Darega Yaru (Movie Saizu)/If I Don't Do It Who Will (Movie Size)

=== Dragon Ball Z Complete Song Collection Box: Mightiest Recorded Legend (2008) ===
Dragon Ball Z Complete Song Collection Box: Mightiest Recorded Legend

Box set
- Released: April 2, 2008
- Language: Japanese
- Label: Columbia

Dragon Ball Z Complete Song Collection Box: Mightiest Recorded Legend (ドラゴンボールZ CD-BOX超全集 ～最強音盤伝説, Doragonbōru Z CD - bokkusu chō zenshū ~ saikyō onban densetsu) was released in 2008.

Disc One:

1. CHA-LA HEAD-CHA-LA
2. Dragon・World e Youkoso!
3. Mama wa Shiawase Inotteru
4. Aitsu wa Son Goku
5. Eien no Chikyuu
6. Shura-iro no Senshi
7. Moero! Dragon Soldiers
8. Trouble・Surfin'
9. Tenkaichi Gohan
10. Joushiki Nante NA★I☆SA
11. Oomori Gohan
12. Chikyuu Kara FOR THE HOME PLANET EARTH
13. Mirai Chizu
14. Tenka Muteki no Furukosu
15. Fly high
16. ALL ALONE
17. I♥(one・heart) Kounen

Disc Two:

1. Dancing in the space
2. Cosmic Chinese Melody
3. Good night my Blue
4. Bad Boy
5. Arashi no Zenchou~Mugon no Zawameki
6. Space Dance
7. Ikusa (I・KU・SA)
8. Piccolo-san Da~isuki
9. Solid State Scouter
10. Otassha Polka
11. Asa-Hiru-Yoru-Kimi-Boku
12. Fuke yo Kaze Yobe yo Shenron!
13. Sharereba Inochi no Izumi Waku Waku!!
14. Oretachi no Energy
15. Kokoro Kara Nureta Futari
16. Onna no Ko wa Tsumitsukuri
17. Makafushigi Adventure! (New Remix Long Version)
18. Aru Hoshi no Shi★
19. happy Birthday
20. CHA-LA HEAD-CHA-LA (Space Version)

Disc Three:

1. Kin-iro Ta・ma・go
2. Marugoto <New Remix Long Version>
3. Arijigoku
4. Tamashii no Michi
5. Aru Hoshi no Shi★★
6. Hikari no Tabi
7. "Ya" na Koto ni wa Genki-Dama!!
8. My Pace
9. Mai・My・Mainichi
10. Kikai no You ni... -Battling Machine-
11. Yume no Kakera
12. Dragon ONDO
13. Kuchibue no Kimochi
14. Tobikkiri no Saikyou Tai Saikyou
15. Power of Smile
16. Me wo Tojireba Kantan
17. Kaze no You ni Hoshi no You ni «Part One»
18. Kaze no You ni Hoshi no You ni «Part Two»

Disc Four:

1. Detekoi Tobikiri ZENKAI Power!
2. Dareka-san to Ii Tenki
3. Toki to Hikari no Shita de
4. Dragon Magic Carnival
5. CAPSULE CORP.
6. Ichido wa Kekkon Shitai Mambo
7. Vegeta-sama no Oryouri Jigoku!! ~"Okonomiyaki" no Kan~
8. Omoide no Tenkaichi Budoukai
9. Sharereba Inochi no Izumi Waku-Waku!! Two
10. Kuchibue no Kimochi • Piccolo Hen
11. I・ke・na・i Urara Magic
12. MIND POWER...Ki...
13. MESSAGE FROM FUTURE...Mirai Kara no Dengon...
14. WARNING OF DANGER...Keikoku...
15. WELCOME HOME, MY BOY...Kaze no Namae...
16. SUPER Plus POWER Equals MELODY...Chou-Ryoku Fushi...
17. IT'S A SMALL WORLD...Koyubi no Shita de...

Disc Five:

1. SWEET LOVELY MIDNIGHT...Tsuki no Uragawa...
2. WHITE & WORLD & TRUE...Shiro to Sekai to Kokoro
3. HERO (Kimi ga Hero)
4. Sonna Kibun de
5. Ryuusei Toshokan ~Comet Library~
6. E na E
7. Keep my way
8. HO・TA・LU
9. Ikashita Energy
10. Saimin Banana
11. Brain Dance
12. GIRIGIRI -Sekai Kyokugen-
13. Ougon no Compass
14. VOICE
15. Aquarium no Yoru
16. KOMA
17. Hoshi no Mita Yume

Disc Six:

1. PLEASE ISSHOU NO ONEGAI!!
2. Delight to you...
3. LED TRAIN de GO!GO!GO!
4. spacepeopleDBZ
5. roller-through 55
6. Cool Cool Dandy
7. WILD DANCE NIGHT《Yoake Made Tsuppashire》
8. Heartbreak Melody, Myou ni
9. Detekoi Tobikiri ZENKAI Power! 《Super House Version》
10. Unmei no Hi ~Tamashii VS Tamashii~
11. I'm a positive girl!!
12. Yoake no Kodomo-tachi
13. FOR EVER~
14. Chousenjou
15. Ijiwaru Shinai De Ne...
16. Aoi Kaze no HOPE
17. Burning・Fight -Nessen・Ressen・Chougekisen-

Disc Seven:

1. Mizu-iro Seinin
2. Sora Meguru Bouken
3. Nanika ga... (Michi no Chikara)
4. Love Jet
5. Trickster to Kaettekita Mirai
6. Boku wa, Massugu Machi wa, Massugu
7. Mother Universe
8. Tobidase! Hero
9. Watashi no Magician
10. Hoshi no Triangle
11. Sora to Ame to...
12. Joke Gurai Iwasero yo...
13. My song for you
14. Ginga wo Koete Rising・High
15. Tobidase! Hero (reprise)
16. WE GOTTA POWER
17. Hey You, Crasher
18. Jumpin' Jump!!
19. Toki yo Tomare ~MY NAME IS FATHER~

Disc Eight:

1. Boku wa Mahoutsukai
2. FIGHT OH FIGHTING ROAD
3. Que Sera
4. Ato wa Silence...
5. Chikara wo Koete
6. Janjaka My Way
7. THIS IN LIFE!
8. Good-Bye Mr.Loneliness ~Hikari no Kanata e~
9. Majin Buu ni Sasageru Ballad
10. Seiki-Matsu Banzai!
11. HIPPY HOPPY SHAKE! UTA
12. OSSAN'S DILEMMA
13. Saraba Namida yo
14. Kinou no Yume, Kyou no Hikari -Silent Night Morning Moon-
15. 100-Oku no Friends
16. Majin Buu no Higeki
17. Memories -Yatsu no Inai Yoru-

Disc Nine:

1. perfume N°18 ~Mashou no Kaori~
2. Hitomi no Naka no Chikyuu
3. Growin' Up Itsuka Mata Aeru Hi Made...
4. Bokutachi wa Tenshi Datta
5. Plus Alpha (+α)
6. Koko ni Oide yo
7. Shizen no Aizu
8. Marugoto
9. Kiseki no Big・Fight
10. Dragon Ball no Densetsu
11. Dragon Power Mugendai
12. Chiisana Senshi ~Goten to Trunks no Theme~
13. Saikyou no Fusion
14. Ai wa Ballad no You ni ~Vegeta no Theme~
15. Ore ga Yaranakya Dare ga Yaru
16. Yuusha no Fue ~Tapion no Theme~
17. Eien no Yakusoku Duet Version
18. Hikari no WILLPOWER

Disc Ten:

1. Namida Mitai na Ame ga Furu
2. Shakunetsu no FIGHTING
3. Mahiru no Yami
4. SIGN ~Kizashi~
5. FIRE OF BLACK ~Kuroi Honoo~
6. NEVER ENDING, NEVER GIVE UP
7. Kimi no Sora e
8. Koi no NAZONAZO
9. Dragon・World e Youkoso! 《Super House Version》
10. Bad Boy 《Super Migaite Mite yo Version》
11. CHA-LA HEAD-CHA-LA 《Super Adventure Version》
12. KUKO'S DANCE MEDLEY 《Ultra New Edition》
13. KAGEYAMA'S POWER MEDLEY 《Ultra New Edition》
14. Sunao na Hikari Yasashii Shisen

Disc Eleven:

1. CHA-LA HEAD-CHA-LA ~JUNGLE FEVER MIX~
2. BATTLE SPECTACLE MEDLEY
3. FOR EVER~'96 ~PIANO NEW VERSION~
4. GIRIGIRI -Sekai Kyokugen- ~EXTREME HARD METAL MIX~
5. PLEASE ISSHOU NO ONEGAI ~ACID CLUB MIX~
6. perfume N°18 ~DANGEROUS FRAGRANT MIX~
7. Ginga wo Koete Rising・High ~GALAXY ADVENTURE MIX~
8. Tobidase! Hero ~DREAM THEATRE MIX~
9. Hikari no Tabi '96 ~CLASSICAL NEW VERSION~
10. CHA-LA HEAD-CHA-LA 2006
11. Detekoi Tobikiri ZENKAI Power! 2006
12. Eien no Chikyuu 2006

Disc Twelve:

1. Ikusa (I・KU・SA) 2006
2. Hikari no Tabi 2006
3. WHITE & WORLD & TRUE...Shiro to Sekai to Kokoro... 2006
4. HERO (Kimi ga Hero) 2006
5. Ougon no Compass 2006
6. Cool Cool Dandy 2006
7. Burning・Fight -Nessen・Ressen・Chougekisen- 2006
8. Mother・Universe 2006
9. WE GOTTA POWER 2006
10. Bokutachi wa Tenshi Datta 2006
11. Kimi no Sora e 2006
12. CHA-LA HEAD-CHA-LA (Karaoke)
13. Detekoi Tobikiri ZENKAI Power! (Karaoke)
14. WE GOTTA POWER (Karaoke)
15. Bokutachi wa Tenshi Datta (Karaoke)

Disc Thirteen:

1. Burning・Fight -Nessen・Ressen・Chougekisen- (Live Version)
2. Saikyou no Fusion (Live Version)
3. Aoi Kaze no HOPE (Live Version)
4. Aitsu wa Son Goku (Live Version)
5. Toki to Hikari no Shita de (Live Version)
6. Hikari no Tabi (Live Version)
7. Dragon Power Mugendai (Live Version)
8. CHA-LA HEAD-CHA-LA (Live Version)
9. Bokutachi wa Tenshi Datta (Live Version)
10. WE GOTTA POWER (Live Version)
11. Marugoto (Live Version)
12. CHA-LA HEAD-CHA-LA (English Version)
13. WE GOTTA POWER (English Version)
14. Bokutachi wa Tenshi Datta (English Version)

=== Dragon Ball Kai: Original Soundtrack (2009) ===
Dragon Ball Kai: Original Soundtrack

Soundtrack album
- Released: August 19, 2009
- Language: Japanese
- Label: Columbia

Dragon Ball Kai: Original Soundtrack is the first official soundtrack of the anime Dragon Ball Z Kai released on August 19, 2009, on CD in Japan only. The soundtrack includes the opening, ending, and background music from the show. There is a limited edition available including three bonus tracks and a Data Carddass card holder. The soundtrack includes thirty-three tracks. Some of those tracks include TV-size versions of the opening and ending themes (previously released in CD singles, episode recap and preview music, and more. The limited edition include three extra bonus tracks.

Track listing:

1. ドラゴンボール改～タイトル～
  Dragon Ball Kai ~Title~
2. 大冒険の予感
  Premonition of a Grand Adventure
3. Dragon Soul (TVサイズ)
  Dragon Soul (TV Size)
4. ドラゴンボール改～サブタイトル～
  Dragon Ball Kai ~Subtitle~
5. 運命
  Destiny
6. 抗えぬ力
  A Power That Cannot Be Defied
7. 絶対絶命
  Desperate Situation
8. 強戦士、サイヤ人
  The Formidable Warrior, the Saiyan
9. 疾走バトル!
  Scampering Battle!
10. 逆転挽回
  An Outcome Switching Recovery
11. Dragon Soul (Orchestra Version)
12. 平穏な時間
  Tranquil Times
13. 大魔王現る
  Daimao Appears
14. 苦戦
  A Tough Struggle
15. 驚愕!
  Shock!
16. 広がりし戦雲
  The Clouds of War Spread
17. ドラゴンボール改～アイキャッチA～
  Dragon Ball Kai ~Eyecatch A~
18. Win Tough Fight! ~Guitar Version~
19. Over the Star ~Piano Version~
20. ドラゴンボール改～アイキャッチB～
  Dragon Ball Kai ~Eyecatch B~
21. 予期せぬ事態
  Unforeseen Circumstances
22. 戦いの幕開け
  The Curtain Rises On the Battle
23. 不安と焦燥
  Anxiety and Unease
24. 大地を駆ける
  Running Across the Land
25. KAME HOUSE
26. バブルス・ダンス
  Bubbles' Dance
27. おののく瞬間
  A Moment for Shuddering
28. 緊迫の荒野
  A Wasteland of Tension
29. レクイエム～死にゆくモノたちへ～
  Requiem ~To Those Who Meet Their End~
30. 強者へ挑む勇士
  The Braveheart Challenges the Strong
31. 強大な敵
  A Mighty Foe
32. Yeah! Break! Care! Break! (TVサイズ)
  Yeah! Break! Care! Break! (TV Size)
33. ドラゴンボール改～次回予告～
  Dragon Ball Kai ~Next Episode Preview~
34. 集え!伝説の超戦士たち [BONUS TRACK]
  Assemble! The Legendary Super Warriors
35. 冒険の始まり [BONUS TRACK]
  The Adventure Begins
36. 最強の敵が現れた!!! [BONUS TRACK]
  The Strongest Enemy Has Appeared!!!

=== Dragon Ball Kai: Original Soundtrack 2 (2009) ===
Dragon Ball Kai: Original Soundtrack 2

Soundtrack album
- Released: 2009
- Language: Japanese
- Label: Columbia

Dragon Ball Kai: Original Soundtrack 2 was released in 2009.

=== Dragon Ball Kai: Soundtrack III & Songs (2010) ===
Dragon Ball Kai: Original Soundtrack III & Songs

Soundtrack album
- Released: 2010
- Language: Japanese
- Label: Columbia

Dragon Ball Kai: Soundtrack III & Songs was released in 2010.

=== Dragon Ball Super: Original Soundtrack (2016) ===
Dragon Ball Super: Original Soundtrack

Soundtrack album
- Released: 2016

Dragon Ball Super: Original Soundtrack was released in 2016.

=== Dragon Ball Super: Original Soundtrack Volume 2 (2018) ===
Dragon Ball Super: Original Soundtrack Volume 2

Soundtrack album
- Released: 2018

Dragon Ball Super: Original Soundtrack Volume 2 was released in 2018.

== Movie soundtracks ==
=== Dragon Ball Z: Music Collection Vol. 1 (1992) ===
Dragon Ball Z: Music Collection Vol. 1

Soundtrack album by Shunsuke Kikuchi
- Released: August 21, 1992; September 22, 2004
- Length: 53:29
- Language: Japanese
- Label: Columbia

Dragon Ball Z: Music Collection Vol. 1 (ドラゴンボールZ 音楽集 Vol.1, Doragon Bōru Zetto Ongakushū Vol. 1) is a compilation soundtrack album that features music of the first seven Dragon Ball Z films by composer Shunsuke Kikuchi. It was first released exclusively in Japan by Columbia Records on August 21, 1992, and again on September 22, 2004, as a part of the Animex 1200 series as its 61st instalment. This album is considered a must for DBZ collectors, as it contains the extended version of Chikyū Marugoto Chô-Kessen that features the music that played as Goku formed the Genki-Dama. As this would later become the de facto theme for the Genki-Dama, notable for its "Dun-Dun-Dun" styled beat.

It peaked at number 86 of the Japanese Albums Chart.

Track listing:

1. CHA-LA HEAD-CHA-LA (TV-size vocal version)
2. 《組曲》ドラゴンボールZ
  《Kumikyoku》Doragon Bōru Zetto/(Musical Suite) Dragon Ball Z
3. 《組曲》この世で一番強いヤツ
  《Kumikyoku》Kono Yo de Ichiban Tsuyoi Yatsu/(Musical Suite) The World's Strongest Guy
4. 《組曲》地球まるごと超決戦
  《Kumikyoku》Chikyū Marugoto Chô-Kessen/(Musical Suite) Super Deciding Battle for the Entire Planet Earth
5. 《組曲》超サイヤ人だ孫悟空
  《Kumikyoku》Sūpā Saiyajin da Son Gokū/(Musical Suite) Son Goku the Super Saiyan
6. CHA-LA HEAD-CHA-LA (full-size instrumental version)
7. 《組曲》とびっきりの最強対最強
  《Kumikyoku》Tobikkiri no Saikyô tai Saikyô/(Musical Suite) The Incredible Mightiest vs. Mightiest
8. 《組曲》激突!! 100億パワーの戦士たち
  《Kumikyoku》Gekitotsu!! 100-Oku Pawā no Senshi-tachi/(Musical Suite) Clash!! The 10,000,000,000 Powerful Warriors
9. 《組曲》極限バトル!! 三大超サイヤ人
  《Kumikyoku》Kyokugen Batoru!! San Dai Sūpā Saiyajin/(Musical Suite) Extreme Battle!! The Three Great Super Saiyans
10. でてこい とびきりZENKAIパワー! (TV-size vocal version)
  Detekoi Tobikiri ZENKAI Pawā! (TV-size vocal version)/Come Out, Incredible ZENKAI Power! (TV-size vocal version)

=== Dragon Ball Z: Music Collection Vol. 2 (1993) ===
Dragon Ball Z: Music Collection Vol. 2

Soundtrack album by Shunsuke Kikuchi
- Released: May 1, 1993; September 22, 2004
- Length: 36:00
- Language: Japanese
- Label: Columbia

Dragon Ball Z: Music Collection Vol. 2 (ドラゴンボールZ 音楽集 Vol.2, Doragon Bōru Zetto Ongakushū Vol. Tsū) is a soundtrack album that features the entire musical score of the eighth Dragon Ball Z film Moe Tsukiro!! Nessen, Retsusen, Chôgekisen (Broly: The Legendary Super Saiyan in the Funimation dub) by composer Shunsuke Kikuchi. It was released by Columbia Records exclusively in Japan first on May 1, 1993, and again on September 22, 2004, as a part of the Animex 1200 series as its 62nd installment.

Track listing:

1. CHA-LA HEAD-CHA-LA
2. 伝説の超サイヤ人
  Densetsu no Sūpā Saiyajin/The Super Saiyan of Legend
3. 新惑星ベジータ
  Shin Wakusei Bejīta/New Planet Vegeta
4. トランクス達の疑惑
  Torankusu-tachi no Giwaku/The Suspicions of Trunks and the Others
5. やって来た孫悟空
  Yattekita Son Gokū/Son Goku Has Arrived
6. 重大な秘密
  Jūdai na Himitsu/An Important Secret
7. 異常な興奮
  Ijô na Kôfun/Unusual Excitement
8. 重く暗い過去
  Omoku Kurai Kako/A Seriously Dark Past
9. 運命の激突!!
  Unmei no Gekitotsu/The Destined Clash
10. ブロリーの正体
  Burorī no Shôtai/True Nature of Broli
11. パラガスの野望
  Paragasu no Yabô/Scheme of Paragus
12. ブロリー変身!!
  Burorī Henshin!!/Broli's Transformation!!
13. 狼狽するベジータ
  Rôbai Suru Bejīta/The Disconcerted Vegeta
14. 復讐の時来る!!
  Fukushū no Toki Kuru!!/The Time for Revenge Comes!!
15. 悪魔のブロリー
  Akuma no Burorī/Broli the Devil
16. 膨れ上がる恐怖
  Fukureagaru Kyôfu/Swelling Fear
17. 悲愴な闘い
  Hisô na Tatakai/The Tragic Battle
18. 野望の最期
  Yabô no Saigo/The Scheme's Final Moments
19. 悟空!! 不屈の闘志
  Gokū!! Fukutsu no Tôshi/Goku!! The Indomitable Fighting Spirit
20. パワーをくれ!!
  Pawā o Kure!!/Lend Me Your Power!!
21. 集合パワーの勝利!!
  Shūgô no Pawā no Shôri!!/The Gathered Power of Triumph!!
22. バーニング・ファイト-熱戦・烈戦・超激戦-
  Bāningu Faito—Nessen Ressen Chô Gekisen--/Burning Fight: A Close, Intense, Super-Fierce Battle

=== Dragon Ball Z: Kiken na Futari! Super Senshi wa Nemurenai Music Collection (1994) ===
Dragon Ball Z: Kiken na Futari! Super Senshi wa Nemurenai Music Collection

Soundtrack album by Shunsuke Kikuchi
- Released: April 1, 1994
- Length: 35:04
- Language: Japanese
- Label: Forte Music Entertainment

Dragon Ball Z: Kiken na Futari! Super Senshi wa Nemurenai Music Collection (ドラゴンボールZ 危険なふたり!超戦士はねむれない MUSIC COLLECTION, Doragon Bōru Zetto Kiken na Futari! Sūpā Senshi wa Nemurenai MUSIC COLLECTION; Dragon Ball Z: The Dangerous Duo! Super-Warriors Never Rest Music Collection) is the licensed soundtrack to the tenth Dragon Ball Z film by the same name (Known outside Japan as Broly Second Coming). It was released by Forte Music Entertainment on April 1, 1994, in Japan only. This contains the film's score by composer Shunsuke Kikuchi and opening and closing themes performed by Hironobu Kageyama.

Track listing:

1. 眠れ﹑超戦士
  Nemure, Chô-Senshi/Sleep, Super-Warrior
2. オープニングテーマ~WE GOTTA POWER
  Ōpuningu Tēma~WE GOTTA POWER/Opening Theme: WE GOTTA POWER
3. ドラゴンボールを追っかけろ！
  Doragon Bōru o Okkakero!/Chase After the Dragon Ball!
4. 二星球は卵と一緒
  Arushinchū wa Tamago to Issho/The Two-Star Ball is Among Eggs
5. ヤンチャ三人組といけにえの少女
  Yancha San'ningumi to Ikenie no Shôjo/The Mischievous Trio and the Scapegoat Young Girl
6. 長老は語る
  Chôrô wa Kataru/The Elder is Speaking
7. 超戦士の目覚め
  Chô-Senshi no Mezame/Awakening of The Super-Warrior
8. 恐竜さんをやっつけろ
  Kyôryū-san o Yattsukero/Defeat Mr. Dinosaur
9. ビーデルSOSブロリーと遭遇！
  Bīderu SOS Burorī to Sôgū!/Videl's SOS: an Encounter with Broli!
10. 四星球奪回作戦
  Sūshinchū Dakkai Sakusen/Tactics for Recapturing the Four-Star Ball
11. どこ﹑どこ？四星球
  Doko, Doko? Sūshinchū/Where, Where? The Four-Star Ball
12. 神龍が出て来ない！？
  Shenron ga Detekonai!?/Shenlong's Not Coming Out!?
13. ブロリー猛襲！！
  Burorī Môshū!!/Broli's Furious Attack!!
14. 復讐のブロリー
  Fukushū no Burorī/The Avenging Broly
15. 闘え！悟飯！！
  Tatakae! Gohan!!/Fight! Gohan!!
16. 終末の始まり
  Shūmatsu no Hajimari/The Beginning of the End
17. 悪魔への変身
  Akuma e no Henshin/Transformation of a Demon
18. 負けるな悟飯！！
  Makeru Na Gohan!!/Don't Lose, Gohan!!
19. ピッコロ登場！？
  Pikkoro Tôjô!?/Piccolo Appears!?
20. 悪魔は死なない
  Akuma wa Shinanai/The Demon Doesn't Die
21. ドラゴンボールの秘密
  Doragon Bōru no Himitsu/Secret of the Dragon Balls
22. 奇蹟を呼び起こせ！！～現れた孫悟空
  Kiseki o Yobiokose!!~Arawareta Son Gokū/Awaken the Miracle!!: Son Goku Appears
23. 悟空親子の勝利
  Gokū Oyako no Shôri/Victory of Goku and His Sons
24. 世界は平和ね
  Sekai wa Heiwa ne/The World's at Peace, Isn't It?
25. エンディングテーマ~奇蹟のビッグ・ファイト
  Endingu Tēma~Kiseki no Biggu Faito/Ending Theme: The Miraculous Big Fight

=== Dragon Ball Z: Super Senshi Gekiha!! Katsu no wa Ore Da Music Collection (1994) ===
Dragon Ball Z: Super Senshi Gekiha!! Katsu No wa Ore da Music Collection

Soundtrack album by Shunsuke Kikuchi
- Released: August 1, 1994
- Length: 32:40
- Language: Japanese
- Label: Forte Music Entertainment

Dragon Ball Z: Super Senshi Gekiha!! Katsu no wa Ore Da Music Collection (ドラゴンボールZ 超戦士撃破!!勝つのはオレだ MUSIC COLLECTION, Doragon Bōru Zetto Sūpā Senshi Gekiha!! Katsu No wa Ore da MUSIC COLLECTION; Dragon Ball Z: Super Warrior Defeat!! I'm the One who'll Win Music Collection) is the licensed soundtrack to the eleventh Dragon Ball Z film by the same name (Known outside Japan as Bio-Broly). It was released by Forte Music Entertainment on April 1, 1994, in Japan only. This contains the film's score by composer Shunsuke Kikuchi and opening and closing themes performed by Hironobu Kageyama.

Track listing:

1. The Baron Jagar Badda's Scheme
2. Opening Theme; WE GOTTA POWER (Hironobu Kageyama)
3. There's Nice Weather Today, Too
4. A Challenge From an Old Friend
5. Well, Let's Get Out There and Make Our Hearts Jump
6. The Bio Warriors' Theme
7. And That Name is Baron Jagar Badda
8. Revenge is Stimulating
9. A Ring is My Stage
10. A Crucial Confrontation! The Bio Army
11. The Small Super-Heroes
12. Is That Brolli!?
13. The Demon, For the Third Time
14. I'm the One Who'll Win!!
15. You're Looking Good, Kuririn
16. A Feast of Terror
17. The Crisis Doesn't Stop
18. Apparent Victory
19. We Did It! The Strategy's Success
20. Brolli's Dying Moments
21. Brolli's Greatest Terror
22. A Menace that Covers the Earth
23. Hope isn't Lost
24. The Fearsome Last Power
25. Feeling Thrilled
26. Ending Theme; Dragon Power Infinity (Hironobu Kageyama)

=== Dragon Ball: Saikyō e no Michi Original Soundtrack (1996) ===
Dragon Ball: Saikyō e no Michi Original Soundtrack

Soundtrack album by Akihito Tokunaga
- Released: March 23, 1996
- Length: 40:05
- Language: Japanese
- Label: Zain Records

Dragon Ball: Saikyō e no Michi Original Soundtrack (ドラゴンボール最強への道オリジナルサウンドトラック, Doragon Bōru Saikyō e no Michi Orijinaru Saundotorakku; Dragon Ball: Road of The Mightiest) is the official licensed soundtrack of 10th anniversary Dragon Ball movie by the same name (The Path to Power in Funimation dub.). It was released by Columbia Records on March 23, 1996, in Japan only. This album contains tracks from the film that also played in Dragon Ball GT due to that the shows composer Akihito Tokunaga worked on the film as well. Because the GT series never received its own soundtrack release, this CD is the only official release of the music from GT. The album also includes the original TV-size recording of the opening theme song from GT, "Dan Dan Kokoro Hikareteku" by the band Field of View.

Track listing:

1. 序章～パオズ山～
  Joshō~Paozu Yama~/Prologue: Mount Pao-tzu
2. ビックリ遭遇！～悟空とブルマ～I
  Bikkuri Sōgū!!~Gokū to Buruma~I/A Surprise Encounter!!: Goku and Bulma I
3. 「女の子」にはシッポがない！？～悟空とブルマ～II
  "On'na no Ko" ni wa Shippo ga Nai!?~Gokū to Buruma II/"Girls" Don't Have Tails!?: Goku and Bulma II
4. bridge①～じっちゃんがふえちゃった！？～
  Burijji ①~Jit-chan ga Fuechatta!?/Bridge ①: Grandpa Multiplied!?
5. ドラゴンボールの秘密～神龍～
  Doragon Bōru no Himitsu~Shenron~/The Secret of theDragon Balls: Shenlong
6. 出発！ドラゴンボールへの旅～悟空とブルマ～III
  Shuppatsu!! Doragon Bōru e no Tabi~Gokū to Buruma III~/Setting Out!! The Journey toward the Dragon Balls: Goku and Bulma III
7. bridge②～レッドリボン軍総本部～
  Burijji ②~Reddo Ribon Gun Sôhonbu~/Bridge 2: Red Ribbon Army Headquarters
8. ウーロンのテーマ～巨大ロボに変身～
  Ūron no Tēma~Kyodai Robo ni Henshin~/Theme of Oolong: Transformation into a Giant Robot
9. ウーロンのテーマ～時間切れ！ウーロンの変身は5分間～
  Ūron no Tēma~Jikan Kire! Ūron no Henka wa 5 Bunkan~/Theme of Oolong: Time Limit!! Oolong's Transformations are for 5 Minutes
10. エッチなウーロン～夢はパフパフ...～
  Etchi na Ūron~Yume wa Pafu-Pafu...~/The Perverted Oolong: His Dream is a Puff-Puff...
11. 危機!! 荒野の大泥棒ヤムチャ来襲
  Kiki!! Kôya no Dai-Dorobō Yamucha Raishū/Crisis!! Yamcha, the Great Bandit of the Wild Attacks
12. 強敵ヤムチャ～狼牙風風拳～
  Kyōteki Yamucha/The Formidable Foe, Yamcha
13. ヤムチャ退敵！？ブルマにドッキリふらふら
  Yamucha Taisan!? Buruma ni Dokkiri Fura-Fura/Yamcha Cracks!? Sent into a Shocked Swoon by Bulma
14. bridge③～発見！一星球～
  Burijji ③~Hakken!! Īshinchū~/Bridge 3: Discovery!! The Yi Xing Qiu
15. レッドリボン軍のテーマ～マッスルタワーのホワイト将軍～
  Reddo Ribon Gun no Tēma/The Red Ribbon Army's Theme
16. 快進撃！悟空
  Kaishingeki!! Gokū/A Sweeping Charge!! Goku
17. 対決!! メタリック軍曹
  Taiketsu!! Metarikku Gunsō/Confrontation!! Sergeant Metallic
18. ハッチャンのテーマI～人造人間8号登場～
  Hat-chan no Tēma 1~Jinzôningen Hachi-gō Tōjō~/Theme of 8-chan 1: Artificial Human #8 Comes on Stage
19. ハッチャンのテーマII～人造人間8号優しい勇気と覚悟～
  Hat-chan no Tēma 2~Jinzōningen Hachi-gō no Yasashii Yūki to Kakugo~/Theme of 8-chan 2: Artificial Human #8's Gentle Courage and Determination
20. ハッチャンと悟空の出会い
  Hat-chan to Gokū no Deai/The Meeting of 8-chan and Goku
21. ハッチャンのテーマIII～今日からともたち～
  Hat-chan no Tēma 3~Kyō Kara Tomodachi~/Theme of 8-chan 3: Friends From This Day on
22. bridge④～海ガメの思返しは果たして！？～
  Burijji ④~Umigame no Ongaeshi wa Hatashite!?~/Bridge ④: Is the Sea Turtle's Repayment for Real!?
23. 海辺の夜明け
  Umibe no Yoake/Dawn on the Beach
24. bridge⑤～海辺の朝～
  Burijji ⑤~Umibe no Asa~/Bridge ⑤: Morning on the Beach
25. 亀仙人のテーマ
  Kame-Sen'nin no Tēma/Theme of Kame-Sen'nin
26. 筋斗雲
  Kinto-Un
27. 悟空﹑筋斗雲に乗る!!br>Gokū, Kinto-Un ni Noru!!/Goku, Riding on Kinto-Un!!
28. お色気ブルマにドッキドキ!! 亀仙人
  O-iroke Buruma ni Dokki-Doki!! Kame-Sen'nin/Put into Palpitations by the Sexy Bulma!! Kame-Sen'nin
29. レッドリボン軍のテーマ～総攻撃！ブルー将軍～
  Reddo Ribon Gun no Tēma ～ Sōkōgeki!! Burū Shōgun/Theme of The Red Ribbon Army ～ All-Out Offensive!! General Blue
30. 本家本元！武天老師のかめはめ波！
  Honkehonmoto! Muten Rôshi/The Original! Muten Rôshi's Kamehameha
31. 誕生！悟空のかめはめ波
  Tanjou! Gokuu no Kamehameha/Birth! Goku's Kamehameha
32. ブルマのロマンス～あこがれのヤムチャ様...！？～
  Buruma no Romansu~Akogare no Yamucha-sama...!?/Bulma's Romance: The Yearned-After Lord Yamcha...!?
33. 荒れ果てた戦場
  Arehate 'ta Senjô/The Desolate Battlefield
34. 大空にバトル！悟空VSバイオレット大佐
  Ōzora no Batoru! Gokū VS Baioretto Taisa/Battle in the Sky! Goku vs. Colonel Violet
35. レッドリボン軍のテーマ～飛行船の追撃～
  Reddo Ribon Gun no Tēma~Hikôtei no Tsuigeki~/Theme of The Red Ribbon Army: Seaplane Pursuit
36. レッドリボン軍～総本部大決戦～
  Reddo Ribon Gun no Tēma~Sōhonbu Dai-Kessen~/Theme of The Red Ribbon Army: Headquarters' Great Deciding Battle
37. レッド総帥の最期～ブラックの野望～
  Reddo Sōsui no Saigo~Burakku no Yabô~/Final Moments of Commander Red:The Plot of Black
38. 巨大ロボット出現!!
  Kyodai Robotto Shutsugen!!/A Giant Robot Appears!!
39. 最後の総帥・ブラックの反乱
  Saigo no Sōsui-Burakku no Hanran/The Last Commander: The Rebellion of Black
40. 最大のピンチ悟空！ハッチャン登場
  Saidai no Pinchi Gokū! Hat-chan Tōjō/Goku in His Greatest Pinch! 8-chan Shows Up
41. ハッチャンのテーマIV～ブラックVSハッチャン～
  Hat-chan no Tēma IV~Burakku VS Hat-chan~/Theme of 8-chan IV: Black vs. 8-chan
42. ハッチャン～悟空との想い出 そして永遠の眠りへ～
  Hat-chan~Gokū to no Omoide Soshite Eien no Nemuri e~/8-chan: Memories of Goku, and then Eternal Sleep
43. 悲しみと怒りのオーラ
  Kanashimi to Ikari no Ōra/An Aura of Sadness and Anger
44. グランド・フィナーレ～神秘の力～
  Gurando Fināre~Shinpi no Chikara~/The Grand Finale: Mysterious Power
45. DAN DAN 心魅かれてく（CINEMA VERSION）
  DAN DAN Kokoro Hikarete 'ku (Cinema Version)/Gradually, You're Charming My Heart (Cinema Version)

=== Dragon Ball Z: Battle of Gods Original Soundtrack (2013) ===
Dragon Ball Z: Battle of Gods Original Soundtrack

Soundtrack album
- Released: 2013

Dragon Ball Z: Battle of Gods Original Soundtrack was released in 2013.

=== Dragon Ball Z: Fukkatsu no "F" Original Soundtrack (2015) ===
Dragon Ball Z: Fukkatsu no "F" Original Soundtrack

Soundtrack album
- Released: 2015

Dragon Ball Z: Fukkatsu no "F" Original Soundtrack was released in 2015.

== Video game soundtracks ==
=== Dragon Ball Z: Super Gokuden Assault Compilation Game Music (1995) ===
Dragon Ball Z: Super Gokuden Assault Compilation Game Music

Soundtrack album by Kenji Yamamoto
- Released: April 21, 1995
- Genre: Anime/Video Game
- Length: 51:03
- Language: Japanese
- Label: Forte Music Entertainment

Dragon Ball Z: Super Gokuden Assault Compilation Game Music (ドラゴンボールZ超悟空伝突激編ゲームミューヅック, Doragon Bōru Zetto Chō Gokūden Totsugeki-hen Gēmu Myūjikku) is the official soundtrack video game of the same name for the Super Famicom. It was released on April 21, 1995.

This feature arranged work composed by Kenji Yamamoto. A few tracks on this album were performed by orchestra. The soundtrack has been referred as ahead of its time.

Track listing:

1. 孫悟空の旅立ち
  Son Gokū no Tabidachi/Embarkation of Son Goku
2. 龍球を求めて
  Ryū-Dama wo Motomete/Seeking Out the Dragon Balls
3. エンカウント
  Enkaunto/Encounter
4. 陽気な仲間達
  Yōki na Nakamatachi/Cheerful Friends
5. ブリッジ2：ミッション
  Burijji Tzū: Misshon/Bridge 2: Mission
6. 偉大な師匠のもとで...
  Idai na Shishō no Motode.../Payment of a Great Teacher...
7. 天下一武道会
  Tenkaichi Budōkai
8. 恐怖の瞬間！！
  Kyōfu no Shunkan!!/Moment of Fear!!
9. 決意！！
  Ketsui!!/Determination!!
10. ブリッジ1：ちょっとひといき‥
  Burijji Wan: Chotto Hitoiki../Bridge 1: A Little Breather..
11. 大魔王復活！！
  Daimaō Fukkatsu!!/The Great Demon King Revived!!
12. 突激！孫悟空
  Totsugeki! Son Gokū/A Violent Strike! Son Goku
13. エピローグ－ピッコロ大魔王の終焉－
  Epirōgu~Pikkoro Daimaō no Shūen~/Epilogue: Final Moments of Piccolo The Great Demon King

=== Dragon Ball Z: Game Music Awaking Compilation (1995) ===
Dragon Ball Z: Game Music Awaking Compilation

Soundtrack album by Kenji Yamamoto
- Released: December 21, 1995
- Genre: Anime/Video Game
- Length: 59:53
- Language: Japanese
- Label: Columbia

Dragon Ball Z: Game Music Awakening Compilation (ドラゴンボールZゲームミュージック・覚醒編, Doragon Bōru Zetto Gēmu Myūjikku Kakusei-hen) is a compilation soundtrack album of various video games. It was released Columbia Records on December 21, 1995.

The album features music from both Super Gokuden 2 and Ultimate Battle 22 composed and performed by Kenji Yamamoto. Also included, are the vocal versions of "Hikari no Willpower" and "Namidami Taina Ame ga Furu", plus vocal and karaoke version of "Eien no Yakusoku" by Hironobu Kageyama and Kuko.

Track listing:

1. 覚醒編・オープニングテーマ
  Kakuseihen Ōpuningu Tēma/Awakening Edition Opening Theme
2. 光のWILL POWER
  Hikari no WILL POWER/Willpower of Light
3. Suite 「強襲！！」
  Suite Kyôshū!!/Suite "Violent Assault!!"
4. Bridge「果てしない冒険」
  Bridge [Hateshinai Bôken]/Bridge "Everlasting Adventure"
5. 絶体絶命
  Zettaizetsumei/A Desperate Situation
6. 戦場を駆ける
  Senjô o Kakeru/Running Battlefields
7. 死神の降誕
  Shinigami no Kôtan/The God of Death's Royal Birth
8. Bridge「神秘の世界」
  Bridge [Shinpi no Sekai]/Bridge "World of Mystery"
9. Suite「陽気な仲間たち2」
  Suite "Yôki na Nakamatachi 2"/Suite: Cheerful Friends 2
10. 界王星
  Kaiôsei/Kaiô Student
11. 哀歌（エレジー）
  Aika (Erejī)/Sad Song (Elegy)
12. Z戦士のテーマ
  Zetto Senshi no Tēma/ Theme of The Z Warriors
13. Bridge「ちょっとひといき・・・2」
  Bridge [Chottohitoiki...Tzū]/Bridge "A Short Break...2"
14. Suite「闘いの挽歌」
  Suite "Tatakai no Banka"/Suite: The Battle's Fight Song
15. 孫悟空･･･復活!!
  Son Gokū... Fukkatsu!!/Son Goku... Revival!!
16. Suite「レクイエム」
  Suite [Rekuiemu]/Suite "Requiem"
17. ナメック星崩壊!!（ゲーム未収録曲）
  Namekkusei Hôkai!! (Gēmu Mishūrokukyoku)/Planet Namek Collapsing!! (Unrecorded Game Song)
18. エンディングテーマ「涙みたいな雨が降る」
  Endeingu Tēma "Namidami Taina Ame ga Furu" [Bōnesu Torakku]/Ending Theme: Tears Falling As It Rain "Bonus Track"
19. 「永遠の約束」カラオケ指導
  "Eien no Yakusoku" Karaoke Shidô/Promise of Eternity: Karaoke Guidance
20. 「永遠の約束」オリジナル・カラオケ
  "Eien no Yakusoku" Orijinaru Karaoke/"Promise of Eternity" Original Karaoke

=== Dragon Ball Z: Game Music Rebirth Compilation (1996) ===
Dragon Ball Z: Game Music Rebirth Compilation

Soundtrack album by Kenji Yamamoto
- Released: April 20, 1996
- Genre: Anime/Video Game
- Length: 58:42
- Language: Japanese
- Label: Columbia

Dragon Ball Z: Game Music Rebirth Compilation (ドラゴンボールZゲームミュージック・再生編, Doragon Bōru Zetto Gēmu Myūjikku Saisei-hen) is a licensed video game soundtrack from various games, and is also the follow-up to the album Awakening Compilation. It was released by Columbia Records on April 20, 1996.

This release includes music from Shin Butoden and Hyper Dimension to name a few. The album cover has miss lead many people to believing that the album is exclusive to the music of Hyper Dimension.

Track listing:

1. 真武闘伝のテーマ
  Shin Butōden no Tēma/Theme of True Fighting Story
2. 闘いの挽歌
  Tatakai no Banka/Elegy of Battle
3. 決戦！
  Kessen!/Decisive Battle!
4. ベジータのテーマ
  Bejīta no Tēma/Theme of Vegeta
5. THEME OF HYPER DIMENSION
6. BATTLE EDITION
7. DANGER SIGNAL
8. DEAR
9. ザーボンのテーマ
  Zābon no Tēma/Theme of Zarbon
10. Mr.サタンモード
  Mr.Satan Mōdo/Mr. Satan Mode
11. 怒れ，悟飯！！
  Okore, Gohan!!/Get Angry, Gohan!!
12. 凶戦士ベジータ
  Kyō Senshi Bejīta/Evil Warrior Vegeta
13. 宿命の対決
  Shukumei no Taiketsu/Confrontation of Destiny
14. エンディングテーマ「灼熱のファイティング」
  Endingu Tēma [Shakunetsu no FIGHTING]/Ending Theme [Incandescence of Fighting]
15. まひるの闇～Prince Of Darkness～
  Mahiru no Yami~Prince Of Darkness~/Darkness of Midday~Prince Of Darkness~
16. 光のWILL POWER（オリジナル・カラオケ）（ボーナストラック）
  Hikari no WILL POWER (orijinaru karaoke) (Bōnasu Torakku)/Willpower of Light [Original Karaoke] (Bonus Track)

Track Credits:
1-13.Kenji Yamamoto
14.Hironobu Kageyama
15.Shin'ichi Ishihara

=== Super Survivor (2008) ===
Super Survivor

Soundtrack album by Hironobu Kageyama
- Released: July 28, 2008
- Genres: Hard rock J-Rock
- Length: 35:04
- Language: Japanese
- Label: Lantis Records

Super Survivor is a licensed release by Hironobu Kageyama. It was released on July 28, 2008, in Japan only. It ranked 188 on Oricon's charts. Originally it was planned to be released on April 9 but it was pushed back for unknown reasons. This album includes the theme songs from Dragon Ball Z video games Sparking Meteor (known outside Japan as Budokai Tenkaichi 3) and Burst Limit, "Super Survivor" and "Kiseki no Honō yo Moeagare!" respectively. This also features both the original Japanese and English versions which are retitled as "Finish'em Off" and "Fight It Out".

Track listing:

1. 序章～パオズ山～
  Joshō~Paozu Yama~/Prologue: Mount Pao-tzu
2. ビックリ遭遇！～悟空とブルマ～I
  Bikkuri Sōgū!!~Gokū to Buruma~I/A Surprise Encounter!!: Goku and Bulma I
3. 「女の子」にはシッポがない！？～悟空とブルマ～II
  "On'na no Ko" ni wa Shippo ga Nai!?~Gokū to Buruma II/"Girls" Don't Have Tails!?: Goku and Bulma II
4. bridge①～じっちゃんがふえちゃった！？～
  Burijji ①~Jit-chan ga Fuechatta!?/Bridge ①: Grandpa Multiplied!?
5. ドラゴンボールの秘密～神龍～
  Doragon Bōru no Himitsu~Shenron~/The Secret of the Dragon Balls: Shenlong
6. 出発！ドラゴンボールへの旅～悟空とブルマ～III
  Shuppatsu!! Doragon Bōru e no Tabi~Gokū to Buruma III~/Setting Out!! The Journey toward the Dragon Balls: Goku and Bulma III
7. bridge②～レッドリボン軍総本部～
  Burijji ②~Reddo Ribon Gun Sôhonbu~/Bridge 2: Red Ribbon Army Headquarters
8. ウーロンのテーマ～巨大ロボに変身～
  Ūron no Tēma~Kyodai Robo ni Henshin~/Theme of Oolong: Transformation into a Giant Robot
9. ウーロンのテーマ～時間切れ！ウーロンの変身は5分間～
  Ūron no Tēma~Jikan Kire! Ūron no Henka wa 5 Bunkan~/Theme of Oolong: Time Limit!! Oolong's Transformations are for 5 Minutes
10. エッチなウーロン～夢はパフパフ...～
  Etchi na Ūron~Yume wa Pafu-Pafu...~/The Perverted Oolong: His Dream is a Puff-Puff...
11. 危機!! 荒野の大泥棒ヤムチャ来襲
  Kiki!! Kôya no Dai-Dorobō Yamucha Raishū/Crisis!! Yamcha, the Great Bandit of the Wild Attacks
12. 強敵ヤムチャ～狼牙風風拳～
  Kyōteki Yamucha/The Formidable Foe, Yamcha
13. ヤムチャ退敵！？ブルマにドッキリふらふら
  Yamucha Taisan!? Buruma ni Dokkiri Fura-Fura/Yamcha Cracks!? Sent into a Shocked Swoon by Bulma
14. bridge③～発見！一星球～
  Burijji ③~Hakken!! Īshinchū~/Bridge 3: Discovery!! The Yi Xing Qiu
15. レッドリボン軍のテーマ～マッスルタワーのホワイト将軍～
  Reddo Ribon Gun no Tēma/The Red Ribbon Army's Theme
16. 快進撃！悟空
  Kaishingeki!! Gokū/A Sweeping Charge!! Goku
17. 対決!! メタリック軍曹
  Taiketsu!! Metarikku Gunsō/Confrontation!! Sergeant Metallic
18. ハッチャンのテーマI～人造人間8号登場～
  Hat-chan no Tēma 1~Jinzôningen Hachi-gō Tōjō~/Theme of 8-chan 1: Artificial Human #8 Comes on Stage
19. ハッチャンのテーマII～人造人間8号優しい勇気と覚悟～
  Hat-chan no Tēma 2~Jinzōningen Hachi-gō no Yasashii Yūki to Kakugo~/Theme of 8-chan 2: Artificial Human #8's Gentle Courage and Determination
20. ハッチャンと悟空の出会い
  Hat-chan to Gokū no Deai/The Meeting of 8-chan and Goku
21. ハッチャンのテーマIII～今日からともたち～
  Hat-chan no Tēma 3~Kyō Kara Tomodachi~/Theme of 8-chan 3: Friends From This Day on
22. bridge④～海ガメの思返しは果たして！？～
  Burijji ④~Umigame no Ongaeshi wa Hatashite!?~/Bridge ④: Is the Sea Turtle's Repayment for Real!?
23. 海辺の夜明け
  Umibe no Yoake/Dawn on the Beach
24. bridge⑤～海辺の朝～
  Burijji ⑤~Umibe no Asa~/Bridge ⑤: Morning on the Beach
25. 亀仙人のテーマ
  Kame-Sen'nin no Tēma/Theme of Kame-Sen'nin
26. 筋斗雲
  Kinto-Un
27. 悟空﹑筋斗雲に乗る!!br>Gokū, Kinto-Un ni Noru!!/Goku, Riding on Kinto-Un!!
28. お色気ブルマにドッキドキ!! 亀仙人
  O-iroke Buruma ni Dokki-Doki!! Kame-Sen'nin/Put into Palpitations by the Sexy Bulma!! Kame-Sen'nin
29. レッドリボン軍のテーマ～総攻撃！ブルー将軍～
  Reddo Ribon Gun no Tēma ～ Sōkōgeki!! Burū Shōgun/Theme of The Red Ribbon Army ～ All-Out Offensive!! General Blue
30. 本家本元！武天老師のかめはめ波！
  Honkehonmoto! Muten Rôshi/The Original! Muten Rôshi's Kamehameha
31. 誕生！悟空のかめはめ波
  Tanjou! Gokuu no Kamehameha/Birth! Goku's Kamehameha
32. ブルマのロマンス～あこがれのヤムチャ様...！？～
  Buruma no Romansu~Akogare no Yamucha-sama...!?/Bulma's Romance: The Yearned-After Lord Yamcha...!?
33. 荒れ果てた戦場
  Arehate 'ta Senjô/The Desolate Battlefield
34. 大空にバトル！悟空VSバイオレット大佐
  Ōzora no Batoru! Gokū VS Baioretto Taisa/Battle in the Sky! Goku vs. Colonel Violet
35. レッドリボン軍のテーマ～飛行船の追撃～
  Reddo Ribon Gun no Tēma~Hikôtei no Tsuigeki~/Theme of The Red Ribbon Army: Seaplane Pursuit
36. レッドリボン軍～総本部大決戦～
  Reddo Ribon Gun no Tēma~Sōhonbu Dai-Kessen~/Theme of The Red Ribbon Army: Headquarters' Great Deciding Battle
37. レッド総帥の最期～ブラックの野望～
  Reddo Sōsui no Saigo~Burakku no Yabô~/Final Moments of Commander Red:The Plot of Black
38. 巨大ロボット出現!!
  Kyodai Robotto Shutsugen!!/A Giant Robot Appears!!
39. 最後の総帥・ブラックの反乱
  Saigo no Sōsui-Burakku no Hanran/The Last Commander: The Rebellion of Black
40. 最大のピンチ悟空！ハッチャン登場
  Saidai no Pinchi Gokū! Hat-chan Tōjō/Goku in His Greatest Pinch! 8-chan Shows Up
41. ハッチャンのテーマIV～ブラックVSハッチャン～
  Hat-chan no Tēma IV~Burakku VS Hat-chan~/Theme of 8-chan IV: Black vs. 8-chan
42. ハッチャン～悟空との想い出 そして永遠の眠りへ～
  Hat-chan~Gokū to no Omoide Soshite Eien no Nemuri e~/8-chan: Memories of Goku, and then Eternal Sleep
43. 悲しみと怒りのオーラ
  Kanashimi to Ikari no Ōra/An Aura of Sadness and Anger
44. グランド・フィナーレ～神秘の力～
  Gurando Fināre~Shinpi no Chikara~/The Grand Finale: Mysterious Power
45. DAN DAN 心魅かれてく（CINEMA VERSION）
  DAN DAN Kokoro Hikarete 'ku (Cinema Version)/Gradually, You're Charming My Heart (Cinema Version)

== Compilation albums ==
=== Dragon Ball Z: Bukkun ===
Dragon Ball Z: Bukkun

Greatest hits album
- Released: August 8, 1991
- Language: Japanese
- Label: Columbia

Dragon Ball Z: Bukkun CD Series (ドラゴンボールZブックンCDシﾘース, Doragon Bōru Zetto Bukkun CD Shirīsu) is a collection of songs from the anime Dragon Ball Z. It was released by Columbia Records on August 8, 1991, in Japan only.

Track listing:

1. CHA-LA HEAD-CHA-LA
2. 天下一ゴハン
  Tenkaichi Gohan/The World's Greatest Gohan
3. ピッコロさんだ～いすき♡
  Pikkoro-san Da~isuki ♡/I Lo~ve Mr. Piccolo ♡
4. 戦（I・KU・SA）
  Ikusa (I•KU•SA)/Battle
5. まるごと
  Marugoto/The Whole World
6. 口笛の気持ち
  Kuchibue no Kimochi/The Feeling of Whistling
7. 「ヤ」なことには元気玉！！
  "Ya" na Koto ni wa Genki-Dama!!/There's a Genki-Dama in Bad Things!!
8. ソリッドステート・スカウター
  Soriddo Sutēto Sukautā/Solid State Scouter
9. 光の旅
  Hikari no Tabi/Journey of Light
10. お達者ポルカ
  O-tassha Poruka/The Healthy Polka
11. アサ・ヒル・ヨル・キミ・ボク
  Asu • Hiru • Yoru • Kimi • Boku/Morning, Daytime, Night, You, Me
12. シャレれば命の泉わくわく！！
  Share 'reba Inochi no Izumi Waku-Waku!!/If I Tell a Joke, It's an Exciting Fountain of Life!!
13. 摩訶不思議アドベンチャー！
  Makafushigi Adobenchā!/Mystical Adventure!
14. でてこい とびきりZENKAIパワー！
  Detekoi Tobikiri ZENKAI Pawā!/Come Out, Incredible ZENKAI Power!

=== Digital Dragon Ball The World (1994) ===
Digital Dragon Ball The World

Soundtrack album by Osamu Shoji
- Released: April 1, 1994
- Length: 43:42
- Language: Japanese
- Label: Columbia

Digital Dragon Ball The World (デジタルドラゴンボールザワールド, Dejitaru Doragon Bōru za Wārudo) is a compilation soundtrack released by Columbia Records on April 1, 1994, in Japan only. Each track on this album contains synthesized medleys of various theme and insert songs from both series.

Track listing:

1. 序曲～探せ！ドラゴンボール(使用曲：魔訶不思議アドベンチャー！)
  Sagase! Doragon Bōru (Makafushigi Adobenchâ!)/Search For Them! Dragon Balls (Mystical Adventure!)
2. 仲間との出会い～修業の日々(使用曲：武天老師の教え/ロマンティックあげるよ/ウルフハリケーン)
  Nakama to no Deai ~ Shugyô no Hibi (Muten Rôshi no Oshie; Romantikku Ageru Yo; Urufu Harikēn) /Meeting Friends ~ Days of Training (The Teachings of Muten Roshi; I'll Give You a Romantic Night; Wolf Hurricane)
3. 天下一武道会への挑戦(使用曲：めざせ天下一)
  Tenka-ichi Budôkai e no Chôsen (Mezase Tenka-ichi)/Challenge to the Tenka-ichi Budôkai (Aim to Be the Greatest on Earth)
4. レッド･リボン軍･ピッコロ大魔王VS悟空(使用曲：レッド･リボン･アーミー/風を感じて)
  Reddo Ribon Gun ~ Pikkoro Daimaô vs Gokû (Reddo Ribon Âmî; Kaze o Kanjite)/The Red Ribbon Army ~ Demon King Piccolo vs. Goku (Red Ribbon Army; Feel the Wind)
5. ドラゴンボール伝説(使用曲：ドラゴンボール伝説)
  Doragon Bōru Densetsu/Dragon Ball Legend
6. 孫悟飯登場(使用曲：CHA-LA HEAD-CHA-LA/口笛の気持ち/でてこいとびきり Zenkai パワー！)
  Son Gohan Tôjô (CHA-LA HEAD-CHA-LA; Kuchibue no Kimochi; Detekoi Tobikiri ZENKAI Pawā!)/Son Gohan Appears (Cha-La Head-Cha-La; The Feeling of Whistling; Come Out, Incredible ZENKAI Power!)
7. 終りなき戦いの日々(使用曲：燃えろ！ドラゴン･ソルジャーズ/戦〈I･KU･SA〉/まるごと/とびっきりの最強対最強/Hiro〈キミがヒーロー〉/銀河を超えてライジング･ハイ)
  Owarinaki Tatakai no Hibi (Moero! Doragon Sorujāzu; Ikusa [I•KU•SA]; Marugoto; Tobikkiri no Saikyô tai Saikyô; HERO [Kimi ga Hîrô]; Ginga o Koete Raijingu Hai)/Days of Endless Battle (Burn, Dragon Soldiers!; The Battle; The Whole World; The Incredible Mightiest vs. Mightiest; Hero [You're the Hero]; Surpassing the Galaxy, Rising High)
8. 死闘！セルゲーム
  Shitô! Seru Gēmu/Life-and-Death Struggle! Cell Games
9. ドラゴーンボールよ永遠に(使用曲：光の旅/青い風のHOPE)
  Doragon Bōru Yo Eien ni (Hikari no Tabi / Aoi Kaze no HOPE)/The Dragon Balls, Eternally! (Light's Journey of light / Blue Wind of Hope)
10. フィナーレ：物語は続くよ，どこまでも(使用曲：ウィ･ガッタ･パワー/僕達は天使だった)
  Monogatari wa Tsuzuku Yo, Doko Made mo (WE GOTTA POWER; Boku-tachi wa Tenshi Datta)/The Story Continues, No Matter Where It Goes! (WE GOTTA POWER; We Use To Be Angels)

=== Dragon Ball Z: The Best Selections (1995) ===
Dragon Ball Z: The Best Selections

Greatest hits album by Various Artists
- Released: April 21, 1995
- Length: 46:56
- Language: Japanese
- Label: Forte Music Entertainment

Dragon Ball Z: The Best Selections (ドラゴンボールZ ザ・ベスト・セレクションズ, Doragon Bōru Zetto Za Besuto Serekushonzu) is a compilation soundtrack released April 21, 1995, in Japan only. This album not only includes the standard theme songs, but it includes songs that were bonus tracks to the movie theme song singles, and from Music Fantasy.

Track listing:

1. WE GOTTA POWER
2. 僕達は天使だった
  Bokutachi wa Tenshi Datta/We Used to be Angels
3. CHA-LA HEAD-CHA-LA
4. でてこいとびきりZENKAIパワー！
  Detekoi Tobikiri ZENKAI Pawā!/Come Out Incredible ZENKAI Power!
5. 最強のフュージョン
  Saikya no Fyūjon/Strongest of Fusion
6. 愛はバラードのように～ベジータのテーマ～
  Ai wa Barā do no Yoni~BEJĪTA no Tēma~/Love is Like a Ballad: Theme of Vegeta
7. ドラゴンパワー∞
  Doragon Pawā Mugendai/Dragon Power Infinity
8. 小さな戦士～悟天とトランクスのテーマ～
  Chīsa na Senshi~Goten to Torankusu no Tēma~/The Young Warriors: Theme of Goten and Trunks
9. カンフー体操
  Kanfū Taiso/Kung-Fu Gymnastics
10. 奇跡のビッグ・ファイト
  Kiseki no Biggu Faito/Big Fight of Miracle
11. ドラゴンボール伝説
  Doragonbōru no Densetsu/Legend of the Dragon Ball
12. MONDAIないさ!!
  MONDAI Naisa!!/No Problem!

=== Dragon Ball Z: Music Fantasy (1995) ===
Dragon Ball Z: Music Fantasy

Soundtrack album by Various Artists
- Released: January 21, 1995
- Length: 42:07
- Language: Japanese
- Label: Forte Music Entertainment

Dragon Ball Z: Music Fantasy (ドラゴンボールZミュージックファンタジー, Doragon Bōru Zetto Musaiku Fantajī) is an image soundtrack released by Forte Music Entertainment on January 21, 1995, in Japan only. This album features synthesized music. Like Digital Dragon Ball, it contains medleys of the opening and closing theme songs from both 'Dragon Ball and Dragon Ball Z. However, it also contains three exclusive vocal tracks.

Track listing:

1. オーバーチュア
  Ōbāchua/Overture
2. Z戦士テーマ
  Z Senshi/ Z Warrior
3. MONDAIないさ！！
  MONDAI Nasai/No Problem
4. 主題歌メドレー～カンフーバトル～
  Shudaika Medorē ~Kanfu Batoru~/Shudaika Melody ~Kung Fu Battle~
5. 仲間達
  Nakamatachi/Colleagues
6. 你好大好き
  Nīhao Daisuki
7. 地獄の叫び
  Jigoku no Sakebi/Yell of Hell
8. 暗黒の帝王
  Ankoku no Teiō
9. キミがいる地球に来たよ
  Kimi Gairuchikyu ni Kitayo
10. クロージングメドレー
  Kurōjingu Medorē/Closing Melody

=== Dragon'98 Special Live (1998) ===
Dragon'98 Special Live

Live album by Monolith
- Released: December 18, 1998 (FSCA-10066); September 10, 2008 (BSCH-30088)
- Length: 46:00
- Language: Japanese
- Labels: Pony Canyon; Sony Music Entertainment

Dragon'98 Special Live is an album of a live concert featuring a few of the solo artist who contributed song for Dragon Ball Z which was held at Shibuya in 1998. It was released by Pony Canyon on December 18, 1998, in Japan only. The album was re-released by Sony Music Entertainment on September 9, 2008. All the artist are collected as Monolith on the album's credits.

Track listing:

1. MIND POWER･･･気･･･
  Mind Power...Ki.../Mind Power...Energy...
2. WHITE & WORLD & TRUE...白と世界と心...
  White & World & True...Shiro to Sekai to Kokoro.../White, the World, and the Heart
3. WARNING OF DANGER･･･警告･･･
  Warning of Danger...Keikoku.../Warning of Danger...Warning...
4. 運命の日～魂VS魂～
  Unmei no Hi ~Tamashii VS Tamashii/Day of Destiny: Spirit vs. Spirit
5. 黄金のコンパス
  Ōgon no Konpasu/Compass of Gold
6. アクアリウムの夜
  Akuariumu no Yoru/Aquarium of Night
7. FOR EVER～
8. 光のWILL POWER
  Hikari no Will Power/Willpower of Light
9. Cool Cool ダンディ
  Cool Cool Dandi/Cool Cool Dandy
10. Brain Dance
11. Cha-La Head-Cha-La ^{1.}

1. Track 11 is listed as CHA-LA HEAD-CHA-LA, but it's in fact the Jungle Fever remix.

=== Dragon Ball Z: Best Remix 2006 1/2 Special (2006) ===
Dragon Ball Z: BEST REMIX 2006 1/(2 Special)

Remix album by Various Artists
- Released: December 20, 2006
- Length: 55:44
- Language: Japanese
- Label: Columbia

Dragon Ball Z: BEST REMIX 2006 1/2 Special (ドラゴンボールZ BEST REMIX 2006 1/2 スペシャル, Doragon Bōru Zetto 2006 Nibun-no-ichi Supesharu) is a remix compilation album of theme and image songs from Dragon Ball Z. It was released on December 20, 2006, by Columbia Records in Japan only.

Track listing:

1. CHA-LA HEAD-CHA-LA
2. でてこい とびきりZENKAIパワー!
  Detekoi Tobikiri ZENKAI Pawā!/Come Out, Incredible ZENKAI Power!
3. 永遠の地球
  Eien no Chikyū/Earth of Eternity
4. 戦(I・KU・SA)
  Ikusa/Battle
5. 光の旅
  Hikari no Tabi/Journey of Light
6. WHITE & WORLD & TRUE・・・白と世界と心
  WHITE & WORLD & TRUE...Shiro to Sekai to Kokoro.../White, the World, and the Heart
7. HERO (キミがヒーロー)
  HERO (Kimi ga Hīrō) /Hero (You're the Hero)
8. 黄金のコンパス
  Ôgon no Konpasu/Compass of Gold
9. Cool Cool ダンディ
  Cool Cool Dandi/Cool Cool Dandy
10. バーニング・ファイト-熱戦・烈戦・超激戦-
  Bāningu Faito—Nessen • Ressen • Chô-Gekisen--/Burning Fight: A Close, Intense, Super-Fierce Battle
11. マザー・ユニバース
  Mazā Yunibāsu/Mother Universe
12. WE GOTTA POWER
13. 僕達は天使だった
  Boku-tachi wa Tenshi datta/We Use To Be Angels
14. 君の空へ
  Kimi no Sora e/To Your Sky

=== Koro-chan Pack Dragon Ball Best (2007) ===
Koro-chan Pack Dragon Ball Best

Greatest hits album by Various Artists
- Released: September 19, 2007
- Length: 20:59
- Language: Japanese
- Label: Columbia Records

Koro-chan Pack Dragon Ball Best (コロちゃんパック ドラゴンボール ベスト, Koro chan Pakku Doragon Bōru Besuto) is a collection of songs released by Columbia Records on September 19, 2007, in Japan only. The album is essentially a part of an ongoing series of albums called the Koro-chan Pack. The album includes the series opening and closing theme songs, three character songs, and the closing theme to the film "Makafushigi Dai-Bōken" (Known outside Japan as Mystical Adventure). Aside from Amazon.com, the album has made appearances on domestic retailer like Target's online store under the name Colo-chan Pack Dragon Ball Best.

Track listing:

1. 魔訶不思議アドヴェンチャー!
  Makafushigi Adobenchâ!/Mystical Adventure!
2. 孫悟空ソング
  Son Gokū Songu/Son Goku Song
3. 武天老師の教え
  Muten Rôshi no Oshie/Teachings of Muten Roshi
4. ドラゴンボール伝説
  Doragon Bōru Densetsu/Dragon Ball Legend
5. ウルフ・ハリケーン
  Urufu Harikēn/Wolf Hurricane
6. ロマンティックあげるよ
  Romantikku Ageru yo/I'll Give You a Romantic Night

=== Koro-chan Pack Dragon Ball Z Best (2007) ===
Koro-chan Pack Dragon Ball Z Best

Greatest hits album by Various Artists
- Released: September 19, 2007
- Length: 23:07
- Language: Japanese
- Label: Columbia

Koro-chan Pack Dragon Ball Z Best (コロちゃんパック ドラゴンボールZ ベスト, Koro chan Pakku Doragon Bōru Zetto Besuto) is a collection of songs from Dragon Ball Z. It was released by Columbia Records on September 19, 2007, in Japan only. The album is essentially a part of an ongoing series of albums called the Koro-chan Pack. The album includes first and second opening and closing theme songs, the closing theme song to TV special Hitori no Saishū Kessen ～Furīza ni Idonda Zetto Senshi Son Gokū no Chichi～ (Known outside Japan as Bardock: The Father of Goku), and the closing theme to the film Gekitotsu!! 100-Oku Pawā no Senshi-tachi (Known outside Japan as Return of Cooler).

Track listing:

1. "Cha-La Head-Cha-La"
2. "Hikari no Tabi" (光の旅; "Journey of Light")
3. "Detekoi Tobikiri Zenkai Power!" (でてこいとびきりZENKAIパワー!, Detekoi Tobikiri ZENKAI Pawā!; Come Out, Incredible Zenkai Power!)
4. "Hero (Kimi ga Hero)" (HERO(キミがヒーロー), HERO (Kimi ga Hīrō); "Hero (You're the Hero)")
5. "We Gotta Power"
6. "Boku-tachi wa Tenshi Datta" (僕達は天使だった; "We Use to be Angels")

== Dragonball Z American Soundtrack series ==
Dragonball Z American Soundtrack series is the domestic soundtrack collection drawn from Bruce Faulconer's music for Dragon Ball Z; Faulconer's music for the series was commissioned by Funimation. These soundtracks were produced by Faulconer between 2001 and 2005.

=== The Best of Dragonball Z: Volume I (2001) ===
Dragonball Z American Soundtrack The Best of Dragonball Z: Volume I

Soundtrack album by Bruce Faulconer
- Released: May 8, 2001
- Recorded: Dallas, Texas
- Genre: Anime
- Length: 57:40
- Label: Faulconer Productions Music
- Producer: Faulconer Productions Music

Dragonball Z American Soundtrack The Best of Dragonball Z: Volume I is the first release from the Dragonball Z American Soundtrack series of the anime Dragon Ball Z. The soundtrack was written and composed by Bruce Faulconer, produced by Faulconer Productions Music and released on May 8, 2001.

Track listing:

1. Dragon Ball Z
2. Call Out the Dragon
3. Future Trunks
4. Gohan Fights Frieza
5. The Makyo Star
6. Garlic Jr. Theme
7. King Cold
8. Frieza's Revival
9. Heroic Trunks
10. Android 16
11. Perfect Cell Runs
12. The Howling
13. Android 17 & 18
14. Destruction
15. Gohan & Icarus
16. The Cell Games
17. 16 Rips Off Cell's Tail
18. Vegeta's Theme
19. Vegeta Powers Up
20. Vegeta - Super Saiyan
21. The Dragon Theme
22. Hyperbolic Time Chamber
23. Goku's Spirit Bomb
24. Super Namek
25. Pikkon's Theme

=== The Best of Dragonball Z: Volume II (2001) ===
Dragonball Z American Soundtrack The Best of Dragonball Z: Volume II

Soundtrack album by Bruce Faulconer
- Released: May 8, 2001
- Recorded: Dallas, Texas
- Genre: Anime
- Length: 61:11
- Label: Faulconer Productions Music
- Producer: Faulconer Productions Music

Dragonball Z American Soundtrack The Best of Dragonball Z: Volume II is the second release from the Dragonball Z American Soundtrack series of the anime Dragon Ball Z. The soundtrack was written and composed by Bruce Faulconer, produced by Faulconer Productions Music and released on May 8, 2001.

Track listing:

1. Hyperbolic Time Chamber
2. Goku and Gohan Train
3. Goku and Kai Face Off
4. Cell and Piccolo Face Off
5. Piccolo Angry
6. Piccolo and 17 Talk
7. Piccolo vs. 17
8. Androids Steal Truck
9. Groovy Discotech
10. Cell at Ball Club
11. Cell at Carnival
12. Weird Circus
13. Electronic Circus
14. Cell Contacts Goku
15. Imperfect Cell Theme
16. Cell Is Dead?
17. Cell Powers Up
18. Demon Mist
19. Dead Zone
20. Frieza vs. Spirit Bomb 1
21. Frieza vs. Spirit Bomb 2
22. Frieza's Death
23. Earth Music
24. Ginyu Transformation
25. Goku's SSJ Transformation
26. Space Room
27. Mysterious Person
28. Supreme Kai's Theme
29. Goku and Gohan in Time Chamber
30. Goku Battles 19
31. Goku Recovers

=== The Best of Dragonball Z: Volume III (2001) ===
Dragonball Z American Soundtrack The Best of Dragonball Z: Volume III

Soundtrack album by Bruce Faulconer
- Released: May 8, 2001
- Recorded: Dallas, Texas
- Genre: Anime
- Length: 65:23
- Label: Faulconer Productions Music
- Producer: Faulconer Productions Music

Dragonball Z American Soundtrack The Best of Dragonball Z: Volume III is the third release in the Dragonball Z American Soundtrack series of the anime Dragon Ball Z. The music contained on the soundtrack was composed and performed by Bruce Faulconer, and was recorded at CakeMix Recording. The album was released by Faulconer Productions Music on May 8, 2001.

Track listing:

1. Wrestling Rock with Lead
2. Frieza Base
3. Trunks Appears
4. Trunks Powerup
5. Perfect Cell Theme
6. Droids vs. Bikers
7. Yamcha Meets Droids
8. Country Store
9. Grand Kai Blues
10. Grand Kai Rocks
11. Ox King Consoles
12. Truckin' 2
13. Underwater
14. Kame Sad
15. Kame Tough
16. Aristocratic British
17. Aerobics
18. Sage Music
19. Gohan Angers 2
20. Gohan Angers
21. Cell Juniors Theme
22. Vegeta Knows His Son
23. Gohan on Film
24. Goku Dies
25. Long Flashback
26. Gohan Powers Up
27. Mushroom March
28. Flight Training
29. Trunks and Goten
30. Videl Gets Hit
31. Videl Gets Up
32. Mysterious B
33. Videl Plummets
34. Trunks and Goten Spar
35. 18 And Mighty Mask Standoff
36. Doubler's Prelude
37. Gohan vs. Doubler
38. Gohan vs. Doubler II
39. Vegeta's Red Power
40. Pre-Buu

=== The Best of Dragonball Z: Volume IV (2003) ===
Dragonball Z American Soundtrack The Best of Dragonball Z: Volume IV

Soundtrack album by Bruce Faulconer
- Released: August 5, 2003
- Recorded: Dallas, Texas
- Genre: Anime
- Length: 61:00
- Label: Faulconer Productions Music
- Producer: Faulconer Productions Music

Dragonball Z American Soundtrack The Best of Dragonball Z: Volume IV is the fourth release from the Dragonball Z American Soundtrack series of the anime Dragon Ball Z. The soundtrack was written and composed by Bruce Faulconer, produced by Faulconer Productions Music and released on August 5, 2003.

Track listing:

1. Frieza Transforms
2. Planet Namek Destruction
3. Energy Disk Music
4. Frieza Begs
5. Android 20 Destroys City
6. 19 Almost Kills Goku
7. Eerie
8. Cell Theme (With Choir)
9. Cell and Piccolo Fight
10. Cell Transforms
11. 16 and the Squirrels
12. King Kai
13. King Kai Dies
14. Snake Way
15. Kame's Tale
16. Cell Returns
17. New Earth Music
18. Wimps Get Whacked
19. Goten's Lizard
20. Nail's Gift
21. Trunks Wins
22. Pui Pui Fights Vegeta
23. Pui Pui Struggles
24. Room Music
25. Yucon Sucks
26. Goku and Kai Standoff
27. Relief Rock
28. Satan Gives Speech
29. Goku Vs. Vegeta
30. Trunks Jumps In
31. Boys Put to Sleep
32. Turbulence
33. SSJ3 Power Up
34. Tourney Talk
35. Kid Buu Is Waiting
36. Buu Is Fighting
37. Pan's Song
38. Uub in the Tournament
39. DBZ Finale

=== Dragonball Z: Trunks Compendium I (2001) ===
Dragonball Z American Soundtrack Dragonball Z: Trunks Compendium I

Soundtrack album by Bruce Faulconer
- Released: April 24, 2001
- Recorded: Dallas, Texas
- Genre: Anime
- Length: 61:00
- Label: Faulconer Productions Music
- Producer: Faulconer Productions Music

Dragonball Z American Soundtrack Dragonball Z: Trunks Compendium I was the first release in the Dragon Ball Z American Soundtrack series of the anime Dragon Ball Z. The soundtrack was composed by Bruce Faulconer and was recorded at CakeMix Recording. It was released by Faulconer Productions Music on April 24, 2001. This album is considered a character album, featuring music related to one of Faulconer's favorite characters, Trunks.

Track listing:

1. Mysterious Youth
2. Prelude to Conflict
3. Prince of the Saiyans
4. The Eyes and the Sword
5. Battle Preparations
6. Palace in the Clouds
7. Training
8. Race to the Island
9. Trunks Meets Goku
10. Trunks Story
11. Time Chamber
12. Androids
13. You're Fighting the Wrong Androids
14. Android Battle
15. Mysterious Youth Revealed
16. Home Sweet Home
17. Back at the Lab
18. 400 GS
19. SSJ Trunks
20. Trunks vs. Cell
21. A Little Help from a Friend
22. The Saga Continues

Bonus Tracks:

1. DBZ Episode #120, Part I
2. DBZ Episode #120, Part II

=== Dragonball Z: Buu the Majin Sagas (2003) ===
Dragonball Z American Soundtrack Dragonball Z: Buu the Majin Sagas

Soundtrack album by Bruce Faulconer
- Released: August 5, 2003
- Recorded: Dallas, Texas
- Genre: Anime
- Length: 61:00
- Label: Faulconer Productions Music
- Producer: Faulconer Productions Music

Dragonball Z American Soundtrack Dragonball Z: Buu the Majin Sagas is the sixth release from the Dragonball Z American Soundtrack series of the anime Dragon Ball Z. The soundtrack was written and composed by Bruce Faulconer, produced by Faulconer Productions Music and released on August 5, 2003.

Track listing:

1. Vegeta Gets Bean
2. Majin Theme
3. Turned to Stone
4. Gohan vs Doubler III
5. Gohan vs Doubler IV
6. Babidi Casts Spell
7. Majin-Vegeta
8. Panic
9. Vegeta vs. Goku
10. Buu's Theme
11. Evil Majin Theme
12. Buu Takes Eyes
13. Babidi and Buu
14. Goku Senses Buu
15. Buu Eats Cookie
16. Mystery of the Z-Sword
17. Buu Takes Punch
18. Buu Throws Worm
19. Spirit Bomb Triumphant
20. Buu Busts Out
21. Piccolo and Babidi
22. Bad News
23. Van Zant's Ride
24. Old Kai's Dance
25. Scary Buu
26. Evil Buu
27. Road to the Chamber
28. Super Buu
29. Buu Anticipates
30. Kid Buu
31. Goku Trains For Buu

=== Android 18: The Android Sagas (2003) ===
Dragonball Z American Soundtrack Android 18: The Android Sagas

Soundtrack album by Bruce Faulconer
- Released: September 9, 2003
- Recorded: Dallas, Texas
- Genre: Anime
- Length: 42:42
- Label: Faulconer Productions Music
- Producer: Faulconer Productions Music

Dragonball Z American Soundtrack Android 18: The Android Sagas is the seventh release from the Dragonball Z American Soundtrack series of the anime Dragon Ball Z. The soundtrack was written and composed by Bruce Faulconer, produced by Faulconer Productions Music and released on September 9, 2003. This is a character album dedicated to Android 18.

Track listing:

1. 17 - 18 Episodic Theme
2. Android Shoots
3. 17 & 18 Kill All
4. 17 - 18 Flashback
5. Serious to Eerie Suspense
6. 17 & 18 Kill All, v2
7. Tien Finds Yamcha
8. Androids Extended
9. Androids vs. Civilians
10. 16 & 18
11. 17 Rebels
12. 16 Charges
13. 17 - 18 Extension
14. 17 - 18 Episodic Theme
15. 19 Attacks Goku
16. 20 Sucks
17. Androids, With Effects
18. Dr. Gero
19. 16 in Lab - Hits
20. Android Chase
21. Droids Driving
22. Beyond Belief, Fast Remix
23. Weird & Backwards
24. Gang Fight
25. 17 - 18 Face Off
26. 20 Catches Krillin
27. Weird Circus, with Trumpet
28. Piccolo Disarms 20
29. 20 vs. Hunter (with delay)
30. Dr. Gero Dies
31. Beyond Belief Techno
32. Truck Explodes
33. Piccolo Attacks 20
34. Techno Flying
35. 17 Charges
36. Androids Extended
37. Android 18 Dance Mix

=== The Best of Dragonball Z: Volume V (2004) ===
Dragonball Z American Soundtrack The Best of Dragonball Z: Volume V

Soundtrack album by Bruce Faulconer
- Released: July 13, 2004
- Recorded: Dallas, Texas
- Genre: Anime
- Length: 60:02
- Label: Faulconer Productions Music
- Producer: Faulconer Productions Music

Dragonball Z American Soundtrack The Best of Dragonball Z: Volume V is the eighth release from the Dragonball Z American Soundtrack series of the anime Dragon Ball Z. The soundtrack was written and composed by Bruce Faulconer, produced by Faulconer Productions Music and released on July 13, 2004.

Track listing:

1. Goku vs. Jeice & Burter
2. Goku's Theme
3. Ginyu Force Theme
4. Piccolo and Nail Fuse
5. Goku's Nightmare
6. Say Goodbye to Namek
7. Mr. Shu's Lesson
8. Mr. Shu's S&M Class
9. Cops Arriving
10. Blowing Up the Lab
11. Goku's Dream
12. Heaven Sent Trunks
13. Bulma's Car / 20 Escapes
14. Episodic Trunks
15. Krillin and Trunks Arrive
16. Tournament March
17. Jazzy Tunes
18. Goku Volunteers Gohan
19. King Yemma
20. Pterodactyl Attack
21. Gohan and Greasers
22. Chi Chi and Videl
23. Gohan Ruins the Shot
24. Brass Fanfare
25. Briefs II
26. Hercule's Orchestra
27. Face-Off
28. Briefs III
29. 18 Makes a Deal
30. Doubler Does Kabito
31. Yacon Blows
32. Shin Panics
33. Turned to Stone II
34. Full Power
35. Vegeta Stops
36. Vegeta Fools Goku
37. Boys Flying
38. Gotenks Is Born
39. Gohan Approaches
40. Intro to Finale and Closing Music

=== The Best of Dragonball Z: Volume Six the Lost Tracks of DBZ (2005) ===
Dragonball Z American Soundtrack The Best of DragonBall Z: Volume Six the Lost Tracks of DBZ

Soundtrack album by Bruce Faulconer
- Released: May 3, 2005
- Recorded: Dallas, Texas
- Genre: Anime
- Length: 70:21
- Label: Faulconer Productions Music
- Producer: Faulconer Productions Music

Dragonball Z American Soundtrack Best of Dragonball Z: Volume Six the Lost Tracks of DBZ is the ninth and final release from the Dragonball Z American Soundtrack series of the anime Dragon Ball Z. The soundtrack was written and composed by Bruce Faulconer, produced by Faulconer Productions Music and released on May 3, 2005.

Track listing:

1. "Cell Yells"
2. "Cell's Slow Theme"
3. "Cell Kills Man"
4. "Cell Destroys Island"
5. "Gohan vs. Cell"
6. "Cell Kills Gunman"
7. "It's Up to Dende"
8. "Vegeta Snoozes"
9. "Race and Crash"
10. "Fight Hits"
11. "Vegeta's Vision"
12. "Vegeta's in Space"
13. "Vegeta Fights Frieza"
14. "Goku and Shenron"
15. "Piccolo vs. Frieza"
16. "Bulma and the Frog"
17. "Bulma and Bubbles"
18. "Farm Destruction"
19. "Garlic Transformation"
20. "Crazy Fight"
21. "Finding the Capsule"
22. "Boogieman"
23. "Gohan Meets Mr. Shu"
24. "Gohan and Chichi Argue"
25. "Chichi Mission"
26. "Industrial"
27. "Goku Is Falling"
28. "Krillin Powers Up"
29. "Goku vs. Caterpillar"
30. "Maron Leaves"
31. "Holy Water"
32. "Gohan SSJ"
33. "Gohan's Sack"
34. "Gohan Hits Tree"
35. "Trunks Tell His Story"
36. "Trunks Power-Up"
37. "Power Music"
38. "Korin's Dinner"
39. "Hell Theme"
40. "Sharpner Runs"
41. "Healing"
42. "Group Watches"
43. "Hercule in Nightclub"
44. "Trunks Hits Hercule"
45. "Trunks Takes Mask"
46. "Majins Absorb Gohan"
47. "Flute and Strings"
48. "MM Splits"
49. "Hercule Arrives"
50. "Hercule Talks With Trunks"
51. "Cake Factory"
52. "Z-Fighters Pathétique"

== Works with Dragon Ball music ==
=== Akira Toriyama: The World (1990) ===
Akira Toriyama: The World (鳥山明 ザ・ワールド, Toriyama Akira za Wārudo) is an image soundtrack featuring music from three anime film adaptations of works by Akira Toriyama: Dragon Ball Z: Chikyū Marugoto Chōkessen, Pink: Water Bandit, Rain Bandit and Kennosuke-sama. It was released by Columbia Records on July 7, 1990. Tracks 2-4 would go on to be included in Dragon Ball Z Complete Song Collection 4: Promise of Eternity.

=== Hironobu Kageyama Best Album 3: Mixture (1996) ===
Hironobu Kageyama Best Album 3: Mixture (影山ヒロノブベストアルバム3 Mixture, Kageyama Hironobu Besuto Arubamu Suri Mixture) is a compilation album by Animesongs artist Hironobu Kageyama. It was released on April 20, 1996, in Japan only. This album is very sought after by fans for its inclusion of English versions of "Cha-La Head-Cha-La", "We Gotta Power", and "Boku-tachi ha Tenshi datta".
