= Dragon Ball Z Kai =

Japanese anime television series

- ドラゴンボール改(カイ); Doragon Bōru Kai
- Genre: Adventure; Fantasy comedy; Martial arts
- Based on: Dragon Ball by Akira Toriyama (Note: Specifically, chapters 195–519 of the original Japanese publication)
- Developed by: Kohei Obara (Note: Credited for cooperation); Caramel Mama; Kazutaka Satoh (#1–98)
- Directed by: Yasuhiro Nowatari (#1–98); Naohiro Terazaki (#99–167)
- Voices of: Masako Nozawa; Ryō Horikawa; Toshio Furukawa; Mayumi Tanaka; Hiromi Tsuru; Hikaru Midorikawa
- Narrated by: Jōji Yanami
- Music by: Kenji Yamamoto (#1–95, replaced) (Note: Yamamoto's score was replaced after episode 95's broadcast due to allegations by Toei Animation that his music was infringing on the rights of third parties.); Shunsuke Kikuchi (#1–98); Norihito Sumitomo (#99–167)
- Opening theme: "Dragon Soul" by Takayoshi Tanimoto (#1–98); "Kuu Zen Zetsu Go" by Takayoshi Tanimoto (#99–159; JP); "Fight It Out" by Masatoshi Ono (#99–167; INT)
- Ending theme: List: "Yeah! Break! Care! Break!" by Takayoshi Tanimoto (#1–54); "Kokoro no Hane" by Team Dragon from AKB48 (#55–98); "Haikei, Tsuratsusutora" by Good Morning America (#99–111; JP); "Junjō" by Leo Ieiri (#112–123; JP); "Oh Yeah!!!!!!!" by Czecho No Republic (#124–136; JP); "Galaxy" by Kyuso Nekokami (#137–146; JP); "Don't Let Me Down" by Gacharic Spin (#147–159; JP); "Never Give Up!!!" by Junear (#99–167; INT)
- Country of origin: Japan
- Original language: Japanese
- No. of episodes: 159 (Japan); 167 (International); (list of episodes)

Production
- Producers: List: Masato Seino (#1–98); Kyōtarō Kimura (#1–98); Kohei Obara (#1–65); Kazuya Watanabe (#15–98); Gō Wakabayashi (#66–98); Osamu Nozaki (#99–167); Naoko Sagawa (#99–167); Norihiro Hayashida (#99–167)
- Editors: Nobutaka Maki; Kenta Katase
- Running time: 23 minutes
- Production companies: Fuji Television; Toei Animation

Original release
- Network: Fuji Television
- Release: April 5, 2009 – March 27, 2011 (#1–97) (Note: Episode 98 did not air on the original run due to news coverage regarding the 2011 Tōhoku earthquake and tsunami.)
- Release: April 6, 2014 – June 28, 2015 (#99–159) (Note: The Japanese run aired 159 episodes, while all 167 episodes were released internationally.)

Related
- Dragon Ball Z (1989–1996); List of all Dragon Ball series; List of all Dragon Ball films

Dragon Ball Z Kai, known in Japan as Dragon Ball Kai (ドラゴンボール改(カイ), Doragon Bōru Kai), is a Japanese anime television series based on the manga series Dragon Ball by Akira Toriyama. The series aired on Fuji Television and its FNS affiliates (Note: With the exception of Fukushima Television) from April 2009 to March 2011.

Produced by Toei Animation to commemorate the anime television series Dragon Ball Z's 20th anniversary, Kai serves as a recut and remastered version that re-records dialogue, improves animation cel quality, and omits most anime exclusive content that was not featured in the original manga.

A continuation covering the final story arcs from the manga, respectively titled internationally as Dragon Ball Z Kai: The Final Chapters, aired from April 2014 to June 2015.

== Production ==
The logo for international broadcasts of Dragon Ball Z Kai

The logo for Dragon Ball Z Kai: The Final Chapters used in international markets

In February 2009, Toei Animation announced that it would begin broadcasting a remastered version of Dragon Ball Z as part of the series' 20th anniversary. The series premiered on Fuji Television and its FNS affiliates in Japan on April 5, 2009, under the title Dragon Ball Kai. The ending suffix Kai (改(カイ)) in the name means "updated" or "altered", reflecting the improvements and corrections of the original work. The original Z footage was remastered into HD, featuring new animated opening and ending sequences, a new original soundtrack, and a re-recording of the vocal tracks. The original Z footage was used for the series, with any damaged or erroneous cel frames being redrawn over. A majority of the filler content from Z was omitted to more closely align with the manga's story, resulting in a faster-paced anime series. According to Kazuhiko Torishima, Kai was conceived when Bandai asked Toriyama if a completely new Dragon Ball anime could be made to increase the franchise's merchandise sales. Toriyama declined to write a new story, so it was decided that a new version of Dragon Ball Z that better aligns with the manga would be produced. Toriyama's reaction to the concept of Kai was positive, with Torishima noting "so it all worked out".

The series initially concluded with the 97th episode in Japan on March 27, 2011, with the finale of the Cell arc. The series was originally scheduled to run for 98 episodes; however, due to news coverage regarding the 2011 Tōhoku earthquake and tsunami, the last episode was not aired during the original run and instead released as a direct-to-video exclusive in Japan on August 2, 2011.

In November 2012, Mayumi Tanaka, the Japanese voice actor of Krillin, announced that she and the rest of the cast were recording more episodes of Dragon Ball Kai. In February 2014, the Kai adaptation of the Majin Buu arc was officially confirmed. The continued run of the series, titled Dragon Ball Z Kai: The Final Chapters internationally, began airing in Japan on Fuji Television and its FNS affiliates on April 6, 2014, and concluded its run on June 28, 2015. The continuation of Kai was produced to run for a total of 69 episodes. However, the Japanese broadcast was edited down to 61 episodes to fit into a timeslot scheduled to be taken over by a new anime series for the franchise, titled Dragon Ball Super, which premiered on July 5, 2015.

=== English dub production and distribution ===
Funimation licensed Kai for an English-language release in February 2010 from Toei Animation Inc. The series was initially broadcast in the United States on Nicktoons from May 24, 2010, to January 1, 2012, continuing to rerun the series until its syndication license for it expired in April 2013. In addition to Nicktoons, the series also began airing on the 4Kids Entertainment-owned Saturday morning programming block Toonzai on The CW in August 2010, then on its successor, the Saban-owned Vortexx, beginning in August 2012 until the block ended in September 2014. Both the Nicktoons and CW broadcasts were edited for content to accommodate their targeted demographics of young children. Kai began airing in its uncut format on Adult Swim's Toonami programming block on November 8, 2014, and reruns of the previous weeks' episodes were aired on an evening slot on Adult Swim proper from February 2015 to June 2016. In the United Kingdom, CSC Media Group acquired the broadcast rights to Kai and began airing it on Kix! in early 2013.

Despite Kai's continuation not being officially confirmed at the time, Funimation voice actors Sean Schemmel (Goku) and Kyle Hebert (Gohan) announced in April 2013 that they had started recording an English dub for new episodes of the series. In November 2013, Kai's Australasian distributor Madman Entertainment revealed that the Majin Buu arc of Kai would be released in 2014 and that they were waiting on dubs to be finished. In February 2014, Funimation officially stated that they had not yet started recording a dub for the final arc of Kai. On December 6, 2016, Funimation announced the continuation of Kai would begin airing on Adult Swim's Toonami programming block. The continuation aired from January 7, 2017, to June 23, 2018, alongside the English dub for Dragon Ball Super. Various international versions of the Cartoon Network also aired the series in various languages including Spanish in Latin America and Kannada, Hindi, and Malayalam in India and Pakistan. The Funimation-produced English-language dub also aired on various Cartoon Network channels in Australia and New Zealand, the Philippines, India, Pakistan, and Southeast Asia in addition to airing on a Southeast Asian and Indian 24/7 Toonami channel.

An alternate English dub of Kai by Ocean Productions was recorded for the first 98 episodes, featuring many of the original Vancouver cast reprising their roles. However, this dub has never been publicly released.

=== Editing ===
During the original Japanese TV airing of Dragon Ball Kai, scenes involving blood and brief nudity were removed. Nicktoons would also alter Kai for its broadcast; it released a preview showcasing these changes which included removing the blood and cheek scar from Bardock and altering the color of Master Roshi's alcohol. The show was further edited for its broadcast on The CW's Toonzai block; most notoriously, the character Mr. Popo was tinted blue. The show's DVD and Blu-ray releases only contained the edits present in the original Japanese version. A rumor that Cartoon Network would be airing Kai uncut was met with an official statement to debunk the rumor in June 2010. It would eventually air uncut on the network as part of Adult Swim's Toonami programming block four years later.

== Music ==
Kenji Yamamoto originally composed the score for Dragon Ball Kai. The opening theme, "Dragon Soul", and the first ending theme used for the first 54 episodes, "Yeah! Break! Care! Break!", are both performed by Dragon Soul's Takayoshi Tanimoto in Japanese. Sean Schemmel, Justin Cook, Vic Mignogna, Greg Ayres, Sonny Strait and Brina Palencia performed variants of the opening theme's English version, while Jerry Jewell performed the English version of the ending theme. The second ending theme, used from episodes 55–98, is "Kokoro no Hane" (心の羽根; lit. 'Wings of the Heart') performed by Team Dragon from AKB48 in Japanese; The English version is performed by Leah Clark. On March 9, 2011, Toei Animation announced that due to Yamamoto's score infringing on the rights of unspecified third parties, the music for remaining episodes (episodes 96 to 98) and any future reruns of previous episodes would be replaced. Later reports from Toei Animation stated that except for the series' opening and closing songs, as well as eyecatch music, Yamamoto's score was replaced with Shunsuke Kikuchi's score from Dragon Ball Z.

The music for The Final Chapters was composed by Norihito Sumitomo. The opening theme is "Kuu Zen Zetsu Go" (空•前•絶•後), performed by Dragon Soul's Takayoshi Tanimoto, while the first ending song is "Haikei, Tsuratsusutora" (拝啓、ツラツストラ; lit. 'Dear Zarathustra'), performed by Good Morning America from episodes 99 to 111. The second ending song is "Junjō" (純情; lit. 'Pure Heart'), performed by Leo Ieiri from episodes 112 to 123, the third is "Oh Yeah!!!!!!!", performed by Czecho No Republic from 124 to 136, the fourth is "Galaxy", performed by Kyuso Nekokami from 137 to 146, and the fifth is "Don't Let Me Down", performed by Gacharic Spin from 147 to 159. All of the songs are exclusive to the Japanese cut. Consequently, the international cut of The Final Chapters features two different pieces of theme music: the opening theme, titled "Fight It Out", is performed by Masatoshi Ono, while the ending theme is "Never Give Up!!!", performed by Junear. As a result of both songs already being sung entirely in English, no localized versions were produced by Funimation.

== Home media release ==
In Japan, Dragon Ball Kai was released in widescreen on 33 DVDs and in fullscreen on eight four-disc Blu-ray sets from September 18, 2009, to August 2, 2011.

Funimation released eight DVD and Blu-ray box sets of Dragon Ball Z Kai from May 18, 2010, to June 5, 2012. These sets contain the original Japanese audio track with English subtitles, as well as the uncut version of the English dub, which does not contain any of the edits made for the TV airings. Before the final volume was even published, Funimation began re-releasing the series in four DVD and Blu-ray "season" sets between May 22, 2012, and March 12, 2013. Funimation released The Final Chapters in three DVD and Blu-ray volumes from April 25 to June 20, 2017.

== Reception ==
The first episode of Dragon Ball Kai earned a viewer ratings percentage of 11.3, ahead of One Piece and behind Crayon Shin-chan. Although following episodes had lower ratings, Kai was among the top 10 anime in viewer ratings every week in Japan for most of its run. Towards the end of the original run the ratings hovered around 9%-10%.

In the United States, Dragon Ball Z Kai premiered on Nicktoons in May 2010 and set the record for the highest-rated premiere in total viewers, and in tweens and boys ages 9–14. Nielsen Mega Manila viewer ratings ranked Dragon Ball Kai with a viewer ratings with a high of 18.4% for October 30 – November 4 in 2012. At the end of April 2013, Dragon Ball Kai would trail just behind One Piece at 14.2%. Broadcasters' Audience Research Board ranked Dragon Ball Z Kai as the second most viewed show in the week it debuted on Kix.

Dragon Ball Z Kai was the third highest rated show upon its debut on the Vortexx Saturday morning block in 2012 with 841,000 viewers and a 0.5 household rating.

== See also ==
- Dragon Ball Super: Beerus – An enhanced edition of the Dragon Ball Super anime series
