= Takayoshi Tanimoto =

Takayoshi Tanimoto 谷本 貴義
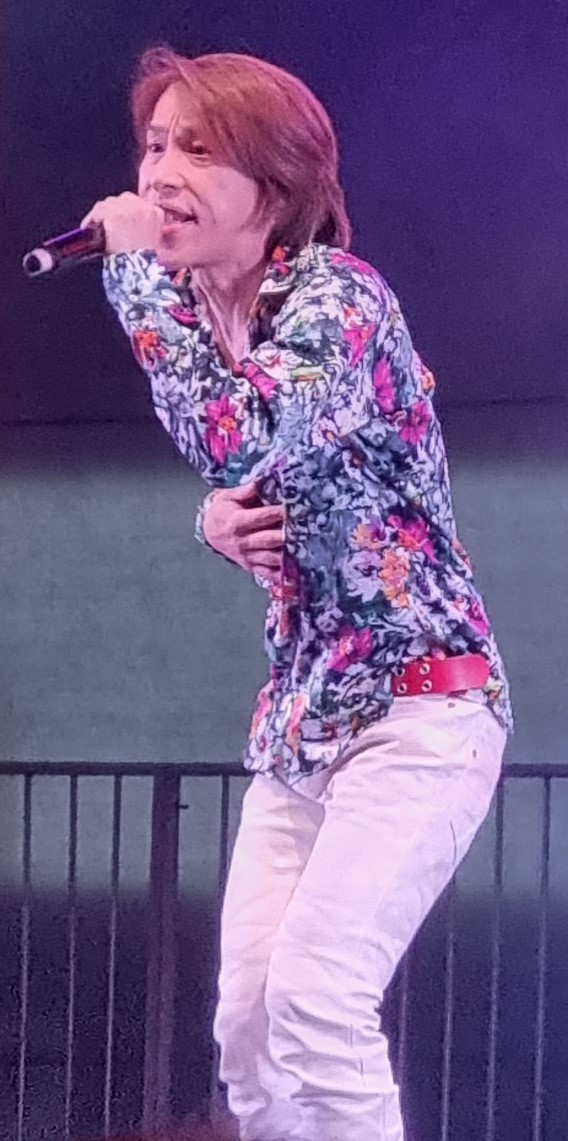
- Takayoshi Tanimoto performing at Anime Summit 2023 in Brasília, Brazil

Background information
- Born: April 14, 1975 (age 51)
- Origin: Japan
- Genres: Anison, rock
- Occupation: Singer
- Instrument: Vocals
- Label: Interchannel (2002-2005) Nippon Columbia (2007-present)
- Member of: Project.R

Takayoshi Tanimoto (谷本 貴義, Tanimoto Takayoshi; born April 14, 1975), is a Japanese vocalist known for his theme song performances in Digimon, Zatch Bell! and Dragon Ball Kai, the last of which he sang "Dragon Soul" and "Yeah! Break! Care! Break!" as one-half of a special unit, Dragon Soul.

== Overview ==
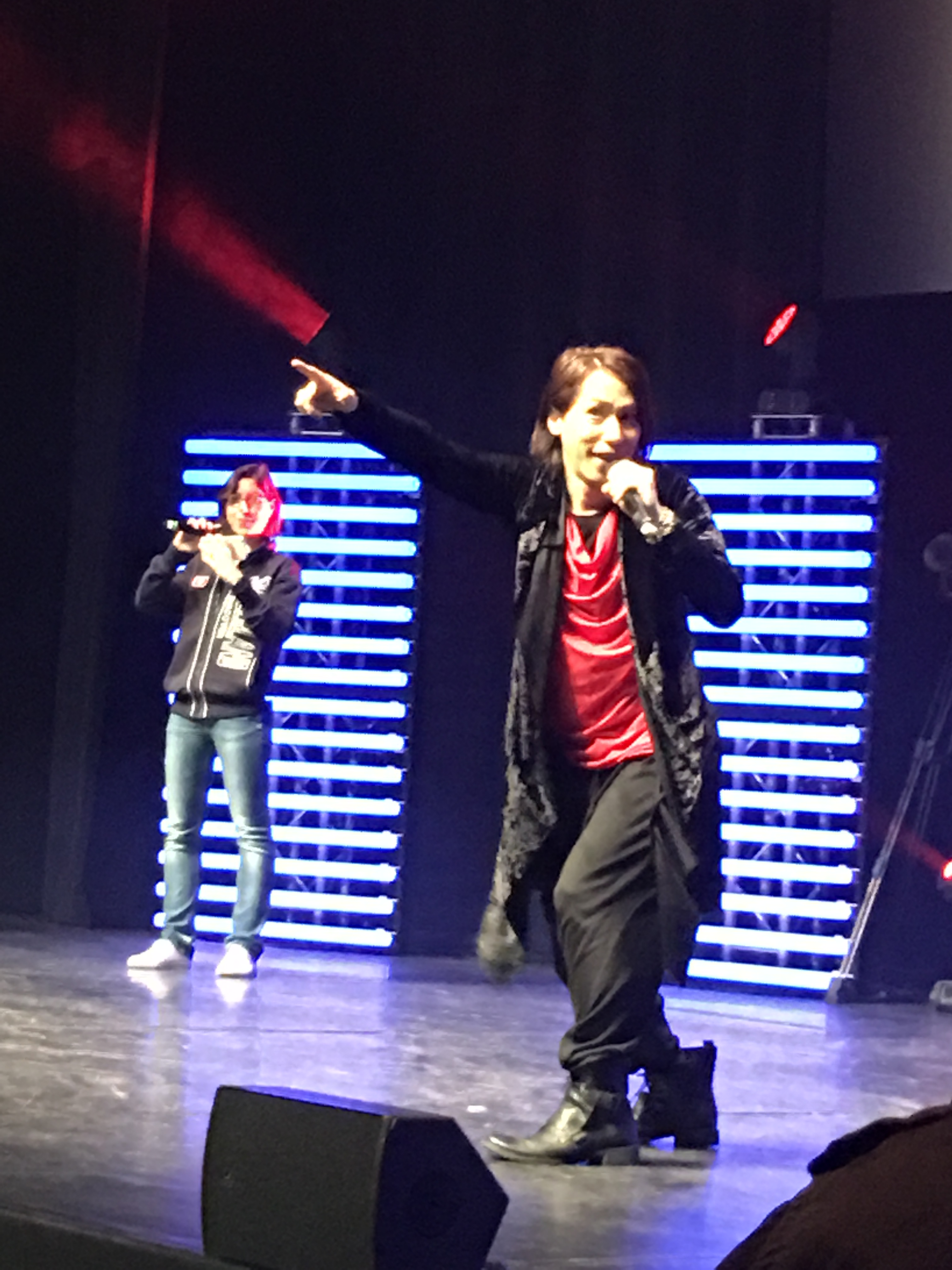
Takayoshi Tanimoto during the Polymanga concert in Maontreux Switzerland, April 2017

Tanimoto's works include "One Vision," which is the Matrix Evolution theme for Digimon Tamers. he also does the main theme for DarkKnightmon and Kiriha in part 2 of Digimon Xros Wars, two of the three opening songs for the anime Zatch Bell!, "Kimi ni Kono Koe ga Todokimasu you ni" (lit. "I Hope My Voice Will Reach You") and "Mienai Tsubasa" (lit. "Invisible Wings"), and the opening of the Super Sentai series Jūken Sentai Gekiranger.

Tanimoto performed "Dragon Soul" the opening and "Yeah! Break! Care! Break!" the ending theme songs for Dragon Ball Kai, the revised and reanimated version of the anime series Dragon Ball Z, as one-half of Dragon Soul. The single of "Dragon Soul" was released on May 20, 2009, peak ranked 23rd on Oricon singles chart and remained for 11 consecutive weeks. The single of "Yeah! Break! Care! Break!" was released on June 24, 2009, peak ranked 23rd on Oricon singles chart and remained for 6 consecutive weeks.

== Discography ==
=== Original albums ===
- THE BEST ELEMENTS (2015.01.14)
  - Fly high
  - You save my heart
  - Kiseki
  - Byun-byun! ToQger (Acoustic version)
- Career along (2020.08.19)
- Break the chain (2021.04.25)
- Face to fate (2024.04.24)
- Sora Kakera (2024.04.24)

=== Singles ===
- One Vision (2002.01.10) - Digimon Tamers insert song
- Juken Sentai Gekiranger (2007.03.07) - Juken Sentai Gekiranger opening theme
- Engine Second Lap -TURBO CUSTOM- (2008.07.02) - Engine Sentai Go-Onger second ending theme (within Project.R with Engine Kids)
  - c/w Take Off! Go-On Wings (with Mayumi Gojo) - Engine Sentai Go-Onger insert song
- Dragon Soul (2009.05.20) - Dragon Ball Kai opening theme (as "Dragon Soul")
  - c/w Muteki AURA no Energy (as "Dragon Soul")
- Yeah! Break! Care! Break! (2009.06.24) - Dragon Ball Kai ending theme (as "Dragon Soul")
- Beast Saga (2013.02.27) - Beast Saga opening theme
  - c/w Wake me up! - Beast Saga ending theme
- Kuu-Zen-Zetsu-Go (2014.06.18) - Dragon Ball Kai (Majin Buu saga) opening theme (as "Dragon Soul")
  - c/w Kimi mo yume de tonda koto ga aru darou (as "Dragon Soul")
- Mikakunin Hikousen (2020.08.19) - Digimon Adventure: opening theme
  - c/w Be The Winners - Digimon Adventure: insert song
  - c/w X-treme Fight - Digimon Adventure: insert song
- Tsunagiai (2024.04.09) - Welcome Home ending theme

=== Featured songs ===
- existence ~KAIXA-nized dice - Kamen Rider 555 image song, in the Book CD (2003.06.18)
- Takami no sora e - Juken Sentai Gekiranger insert song, in the second Original Album ~Gekiuta Collection~ (2007.08.01)
- Change Your BEAT - Custom Beat Battle: Draglade 2 theme song, in the Original Soundtrack (2008.08.20)
- Break up! - Custom Beat Battle: Draglade 2 ending theme song, in the Original Soundtrack (2008.08.20)
- Cho ☆ Super Dragon Soul - Dragon Ball Kai insert song, in the SONG COLLECTION (2011.11.04) (as "Dragon Soul")
- Heart - Suki Desu Suzuki-kun!! OVA official fanbook ending song (2010.07.29)
- Gokai Zenkai Dash!! - Kaizoku Sentai Gokaiger insert song, in Gokaiger's Mini Album (2011.04.20)
- Shinonderu baai janai!! - Shuriken Sentai Ninninger insert song, in Ninninger's 2nd Mini Album (2015.07.29)
- M·A·X POWER - Kaitou Sentai Lupinranger VS Keisatsu Sentai Patranger insert song in the VS Collection (2018.08.29)
