= Takafumi Iwasaki =

- Born: August 29, 1976 (age 50)
- Genres: rock, anison, pop rock
- Instrument: Guitar
- Website: www.h6.dion.ne.jp/~tkfm/

Takafumi Iwasaki (岩崎 貴文, Iwasaki Takafumi) is a Japanese guitarist, lyricist, music arranger, and musical artist from Kumamoto Prefecture. He is signed to Columbia Music Entertainment, for which he is known for writing and performing various anime and tokusatsu theme songs. He is known for his solo performance of the theme song of Mahou Sentai Magiranger and for performing guitar for the Dragon Ball Kai theme songs "Dragon Soul" and "Yeah! Break! Care! Break!", which he also composed as one-half of a special unit, Dragon Soul. He is part of Columbia's Project.R group for Super Sentai theme songs.
