= Czecho No Republic =

Japanese band

- Origin: Japan
- Genres: Pop rock
- Years active: 2010–present
- Labels: Nippon Columbia (2013–present)
- Members: Masami Takei (vocals, bass); Shōtarō Yamazaki (ex. Romance) (drums); Kazuki Sunagawa (guitar); Mai Takahashi (guitar, synthesizer, vocals)
- Past members: Adimu Yoshida (guitar); Rui Yagi (guitar, synthesizer, chorus)
- Website: c-n-r.jp

Czecho No Republic (チェコ・ノー・リパブリック, Cheko Nō Ripaburikku) is a Japanese band. Their album Santa Fe reached the 19th place on the Weekly Oricon Albums Chart and their singles "For You" and "Oh Yeah!!!!!!!" reached the 24th place on the Weekly Oricon Singles Chart. "Oh Yeah!!!!!!!" was also the third ending song for the second season of the Dragon Ball Kai anime television series. Their single "Forever Dreaming" is the fourth ending theme for Dragon Ball Super.

== Discography ==
=== Albums ===
| Release date | Title | Oricon (Note: Peak ranking on the weekly Oricon Albums Chart.) | Ref. |
|---|---|---|---|
| October 5, 2011 | Maminka | 125 | |
| June 6, 2012 | Dinosaur (stylized as DINOSAUR) | 100 | |
| October 30, 2013 | Neverland (stylized as NEVERLAND) | 31 | |
| July 16, 2014 | Mantle (stylized as MANTLE) | 26 | |
| September 9, 2015 | Santa Fe | 19 | |
| July 20, 2016 | Dreams (stylized as DREAMS) | 27 | |
| March 14, 2018 | Tabi ni Deru Junbi (旅に出る準備, lit. "preparations to go out on a trip") | unknown | |

=== Singles ===
| Release date | Title | Oricon (Note: Peak ranking on the weekly Oricon Singles Chart.) | Ref. |
|---|---|---|---|
| June 8, 2011 | "Casually" | 114 | |
| November 7, 2012 | "Ivory" (stylized as "IVORY") | 94 | |
| June 26, 2013 | "Festival" | — | |
| November 12, 2014 | "Oh Yeah!!!!!!!" | 24 | |
| February 4, 2015 | "For You" | 24 | |
| May 18, 2016 | "Forever Dreaming" | 37 | |
| September 27, 2017 | "Time Traveling" (タイムトラベリング, Taimu Toraberingu) (Czecho No Republic × Sky-Hi) | unknown | |

== DVDs ==
| Release date | Title | Oricon (Note: Peak ranking on the weekly Oricon DVD Chart.) | Ref. |
|---|---|---|---|
| March 30, 2016 | Naka to Soto (stylized as NAKA TO SOTO) | 44 | |
