= Yeah! Break! Care! Break! =

Single by Takayoshi Tanimoto (Dragon Soul)
- A-side: "Yeah! Break! Care! Break!"
- B-side: "Over the Star"
- Released: June 24, 2009
- Genre: Pop
- Label: Columbia Music Entertainment
- Songwriters: Yuriko Mori; Takafumi Iwasaki

Takayoshi Tanimoto (Dragon Soul) singles chronology
"Dragon Soul" (2009)	"Yeah! Break! Care! Break!" (2009)

"Yeah! Break! Care! Break!" (ヤ・ブレ・カ・ブレ, Ya Bure Ka Bure) is the eighth single by Japanese pop artist Takayoshi Tanimoto and the second with Takafumi Iwasaki as the unit "Dragon Soul". It was released on CD on June 24, 2009, as both a regular edition and a limited edition which included a Dragon Ball Kai Dragon Battlers trading card game card. The A-side is the first ending theme for the anime Dragon Ball Kai. The B-side is performed by Saki Oshitani, and was used as an insert song for Kai. The single remained on the Oricon charts for 8 weeks, peaking at #23. In 2010, when Kai was licensed by Funimation, they produced an English version of the ending, sung by Jerry Jewell.

== Track listing ==
1. "Yeah! Break! Care! Break!"
2. "Over the Star"
3. "Yeah! Break! Care! Break! (Original Karaoke)"
4. "Over the Star (Original Karaoke)"
