= Dragon Soul =

2009 single by Takayoshi Tanimoto

Single by Takayoshi Tanimoto (Dragon Soul)
- A-side: "Dragon Soul"
- B-side: "Muteki Aura no Energy"
- Released: May 20, 2009
- Genre: Pop rock
- Label: Columbia
- Songwriter: Yumi Yoshimoto

Takayoshi Tanimoto (Dragon Soul) singles chronology
"Dragon Soul" (2009)	"Yeah! Break! Care! Break!" (2009)

"Dragon Soul" is a song by Japanese singer Takayoshi Tanimoto, released as his seventh single. He performed the song with guitarist and composer Takafumi Iwasaki as part of a special unit also called "Dragon Soul". It was released on CD on May 20, 2009, as both a regular and limited edition; the limited edition included a Dragon Ball Kai Dragon Battlers trading card game card. The song is best known for being used as the opening of the Dragon Ball Kai television anime series.

The single remained on the Oricon Weekly Charts for 18 weeks and during that time it peaked at #23.

== Track list ==
1. "Dragon Soul"
2. "Muteki Aura no Energy" (無敵AURAのエナジー, Muteki Ōra no Enajī; "The Invincible Aura's Energy")
3. "Dragon Soul (Original Karaoke)"
4. "Muteki Aura no Energy (Original Karaoke)"

== Cover versions ==
When Dragon Ball Kai was licensed in North America in 2010 as Dragon Ball Z Kai, Funimation recorded "Dragon Soul" in English, with lyrics written by Brina Palencia. The uncut DVD/Blu-ray Disc volumes feature a different singer for each release. Part 1 is sung by Sean Schemmel, who also does the voice of Goku and King Kai. Part 2 is sung by Justin Cook, who also does the voice of Raditz. Part 3 is sung by Vic Mignogna, who also does the voices of Broly and Burter; his version was also used for the Nicktoons and The CW 4Kids airings of the show. Part 4 is sung by Greg Ayres, who also did the voice of Guldo in Dragon Ball Z Kai. Part 5 is sung by Sonny Strait, who is also the voice of Krillin. Part 6 is sung by Brina Palencia herself, who also does the voice of Chiaotzu and Puar. Part 7 is sung in a trio by Sean Schemmel, Justin Cook, and Greg Ayres. Part 8 is also sung in a trio by Vic Mignogna, Sonny Strait, and Brina Palencia.
