= ANNO: X =

Compilation album by Rodrigo Rossi
- Released: February 28, 2019
- Genre: Anime song
- Length: 55:43
- Language: Brazilian Portuguese
- Producer: Rodrigo Rossi

Rodrigo Rossi chronology
Rec/All	ANNO: X

ANNO: X is a compilation album of official anime songs sung by Rodrigo Rossi released in 2019. Nearly all songs had the Portuguese lyrics written by Rossi himself (all but Pegasus Fantasy and Soldier Dream), who also produced and mixed the album.

It was released ten years after the singer's first time singing an anime song officially, hence the title. He started in 2010 with the Brazilian Portuguese version of the opening of Saint Seiya: The Lost Canvas.

There are 15 tracks, several with other musicians' participation, such as his Danger3's colleagues Larissa Tassi and Ricardo Cruz; Junior Hagemeyer from Projeto Remake; Davis Ramay; Cesário Filho, Sidney Sohn Jr.; Ovídio Cleto and Wendel Bezerra.

== Track listing ==
ANNO: X track listing
No.	Title	Lyrics	Original by	Length
1.	"Limit Break x Survivor" (from Dragon Ball Super)	Rodrigo Rossi	Kiyoshi Hikawa	3:50
2.	"O Reino de Atena" (from Saint Seiya: The Lost Canvas)	Rodrigo Rossi	EUROX	4:42
3.	"Yeah! Break! Care! Break!" (from Dragon Ball Kai)	Rodrigo Rossi	Takayoshi Tanimoto	3:44
4.	"Pegasus Fantasy versão Omega" (from Saint Seiya Omega)		MAKE-UP featuring Shoko Nakagawa	2:38
5.	"Hello! Hello! Hello!" (from Dragon Ball Super)	Rodrigo Rossi	Good Morning America	3:50
6.	"Laços de Flor" (from Saint Seiya: The Lost Canvas)	Rodrigo Rossi	Maki Ikuno featuring Marina Del Ray	4:07
7.	"A Promessa do Amanhã" (from Saint Seiya: Soul of Gold)	Rodrigo Rossi	Root Five	5:17
8.	"Soldier Dream" (from Saint Seiya: Soul of Gold)		Root Five	2:38
9.	"Dragon Soul" (from Dragon Ball Kai)	Rodrigo Rossi	Takayoshi Tanimoto	4:25
10.	"Evolução Ω" (from Saint Seiya Omega)	Rodrigo Rossi	Nagareda Project	2:52
11.	"Vou Lutar" (from Dragon Ball Kai)	Rodrigo Rossi	Masatoshi Ono	3:26
12.	"Cordas de Luz" (from Saint Seiya Omega)	Rodrigo Rossi	Cyntia	3:08
13.	"Nunca Desista" (from Dragon Ball Kai)	Rodrigo Rossi	Junear	2:38
14.	"Nova Geração" (from Saint Seiya Omega)	Rodrigo Rossi	Root Five	3:17
15.	"Hero" (from Saint Seiya: Legend of Sanctuary)	Rodrigo Rossi	Yoshiki	5:05
Total length:				55:43
