= Survive Said the Prophet =

Japanese alternative metal band

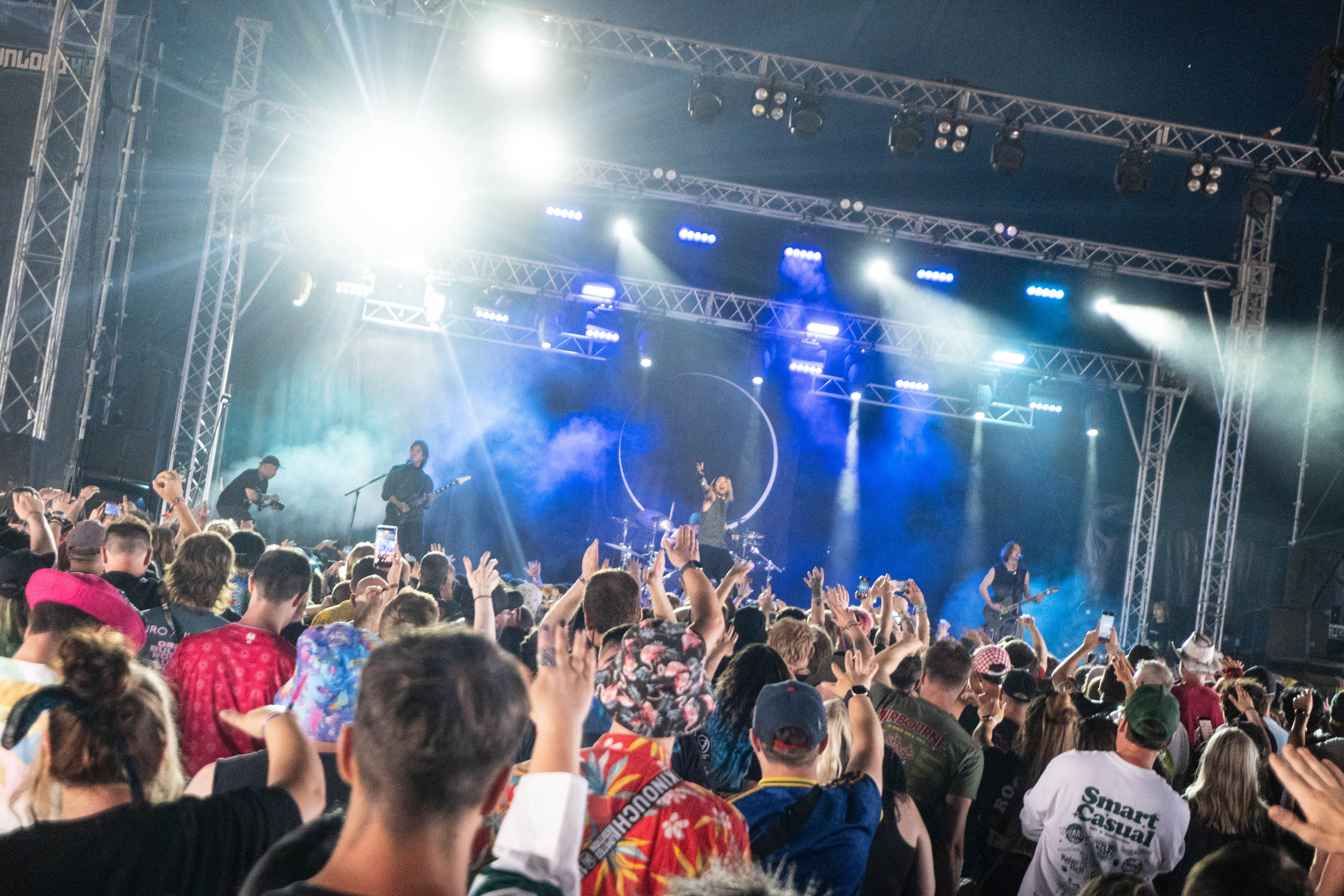
- Survive Said The Prophet performing at Download Festival in 2025

Background information
- Origin: Tokyo, Japan
- Genres: Post-hardcore; alternative rock; melodic hardcore; metalcore
- Years active: 2011–present
- Labels: Zestone Records (2016–2017); Sony Music Records (2017–2023); Jisedai Inc. (Sony Music) (2023–present)
- Members: Yosh Morita (Yosh); Tatsuya Kato (Tatsuya); Sho Okada (Show)
- Past members: Takuya Suzuki; Kei Tatsuno; Yudai Kato; Ivan Kwong
- Website: survivesaidtheprophet.com

Survive Said the Prophet, also known as Sabapuro and abbreviated SSTP, is a Japanese rock band formed in Tokyo in 2011. They are incorporated under the Sony Music Records label and are most well known for the hit 2019 single "Mukanjyo", the first opening of the anime Vinland Saga.

== Biography ==
The group was formed in 2011 in Tokyo from all members of its predecessor band, YesterdayFall, except guitarist Shige and bassist Junya. That year saw the limited release of the group's first single, "Let Us Party". It was followed in 2012 by their titular EP Survive Said the Prophet. By 2014, they had released the singles "Meiam" and "Cocoon", each limited to 1,000 copies.

In 2015, they released Course of Action, their first album distributed nationwide, on their own label. Vocalist Yosh participated in the vocal project of popular playwright Hiroyuki Sawano. Meanwhile, guitarist Takuya Suzuki withdrew. In 2016, the band made a contract with Zestone Records, with guitarist Tatsuya joining. They appeared at Knotfest in 2016. They released their second album, Fixed, with Chris vCrummett as producer. It ranked 3rd in the "Breakthrough Artist" category chosen by readers of AP Japan magazine.

In 2017, at the finale of the "Fixed" tour, the one-man show at Tsutaya O-West was sold out. The band appeared in "Punkspring 2017" and "Summer Sonic 2017" and teamed up with Chris Crummett again to release their 3rd album, Wabi Sabi. The group appeared at "Countdown Japan 17/18" in December, opened for American Rock band Paramore in February at the Zepp Tokyo, and in May 2018, the double A-side single "Ne: One" / "Hi-Lo" ("Anyone" / "High and Low") was released. The single "Found & Lost" was released in August, while in September, they released the fourth album Space[s] with Sony Music Records and made a major debut. From October to February of the following year, the Space Tour 2018–19 was held with 27 performances in 26 cities. In December, the single "Red" was released. The band then appeared on "Countdown Japan 18/19".

In 2019, the 47-prefecture "Now More Than Ever Tour" took place from March to June. In August, the single "Mukanjyo" was released. The "Made in Asia Tour" was held from September to December, including performances at Zepp Divercity Tokyo. The tour finale was held at Shinkiba Studio Coast.

In 2020, they released their fifth album Inside Your Head. Survive Said The Prophet toured across 20 cities in Japan during their Inside Your Head Tour from February to May 2020. In October, to commemorate the 10th anniversary of their formation, the members looked back on their 10 years, selecting 10 songs that they felt symbolised themselves as a band, and five songs selected based on fan votes. A total of 20 songs, including their top five popular songs, were compiled as the best-of album To Redefine / To Be Defined and released on January 20, 2021. The singer, Yosh, sang the song from Final Fantasy VII Remake, Hollow, the official theme of said game. In February 2020, Survive Said The Prophet performed at BLARE FEST. 2020, a festival organized by coldrain. Yosh joined Pay Money To My Pain’s stage with NOISEMAKER’s AG for a tribute performance of the song “Pictures” in honor of the band's vocalist K.

In 2021, bassist/vocalist Yudai departed from the band, and Dr. Show appeared as El Tempo at the closing ceremony of the 2020 Tokyo Paralympics.

On October 12, 2022, the band released their album Hateful Failures. The album was released two years after their previous full-length original work and was created under the central concept of “hateful failures,” exploring themes of resentment and mistakes. To promote the album, the band embarked on the Hateful Failures Tour, which began on October 21, 2022, at EIGHT HALL in Kanazawa and included performances across 11 cities throughout Japan. The tour concluded with a final show at EX THEATER ROPPONGI.

In January 2023, Survive Said The Prophet revived their self-produced event "MAGIC HOUR" for the first time in five years, holding it across five cities in Japan. The event featured guest performances by Stand Atlantic and Knosis. On February 3, the band opened up for the American rock band Hoobastank on their Japan Tour at Spotify O-East, Tokyo. On April 4, 2023, the band released the single "Paradox", which was selected as the opening theme for the second season of the television anime Vinland Saga. The track began streaming in advance on the same day. The CD single was officially released on May 17, 2023. In July, the band appeared as a guest performer at Anime Friends in São Paulo. The band also appeared as a guest performer at Anime NYC in New York City in November 2023.

In June 2024, the band held their co-headlining MAGIC HOUR TOUR, featuring guest acts coldrain, SHANK, and 04 Limited Sazabys. In July 2024, Survive Said The Prophet embarked on their first North American tour, titled "MAKE / BREAK YOURSELF America Tour," with performances in cities including New York, Toronto, Chicago, Seattle, Berkeley, Los Angeles, and San Diego. The band also embarked on "Survive Said The Prophet JAPAN TOUR 2024–2025", a nationwide tour beginning from September and running through January 2025, with over 20 shows across Japan.

On March 26, 2025, they released the single "State Of Mind", which featured Matt Good of American post-hardcore band From First to Last marking the band’s first new release in approximately two years. They launched a headlining tour titled State Of Mind Tour, spanning 10 performances across 9 cities throughout Japan to promote the single. On May 28, 2025, Survive Said The Prophet released the single, "Useless," featuring Ryo Kinoshita of Knosis (formerly Crystal Lake) and embarked on their first European and UK Tour titled "EU / UK Tour 2025". The tour included performances at major festivals such as Rock am Ring and Rock im Park (Germany), Rock for People (Czech Republic), and Download Festival (UK), with all individual headline shows sold out. Following their return from the EU/UK Tour 2025, Survive Said The Prophet announced their first new album in three years, titled Luv Sux Sessions. The album is scheduled for release on August 20, 2025. The bands lead single "X_AXIS" off of the album was selected as the theme song for the arcade game Mobile Suit Gundam Extreme Vs. 2 Infinite Boost and was released on July 7. On July 28, it was announced that Ivan Kwong departed from band due to personal reasons and differences in vision, with the band continuing as a three-member lineup of Yosh, Tatsuya, and Show. It was also announced on the bands official website and social media that the release of Luv Sux Sessions postponed from to September 24, with digital distribution beginning on September 3.

== Members ==
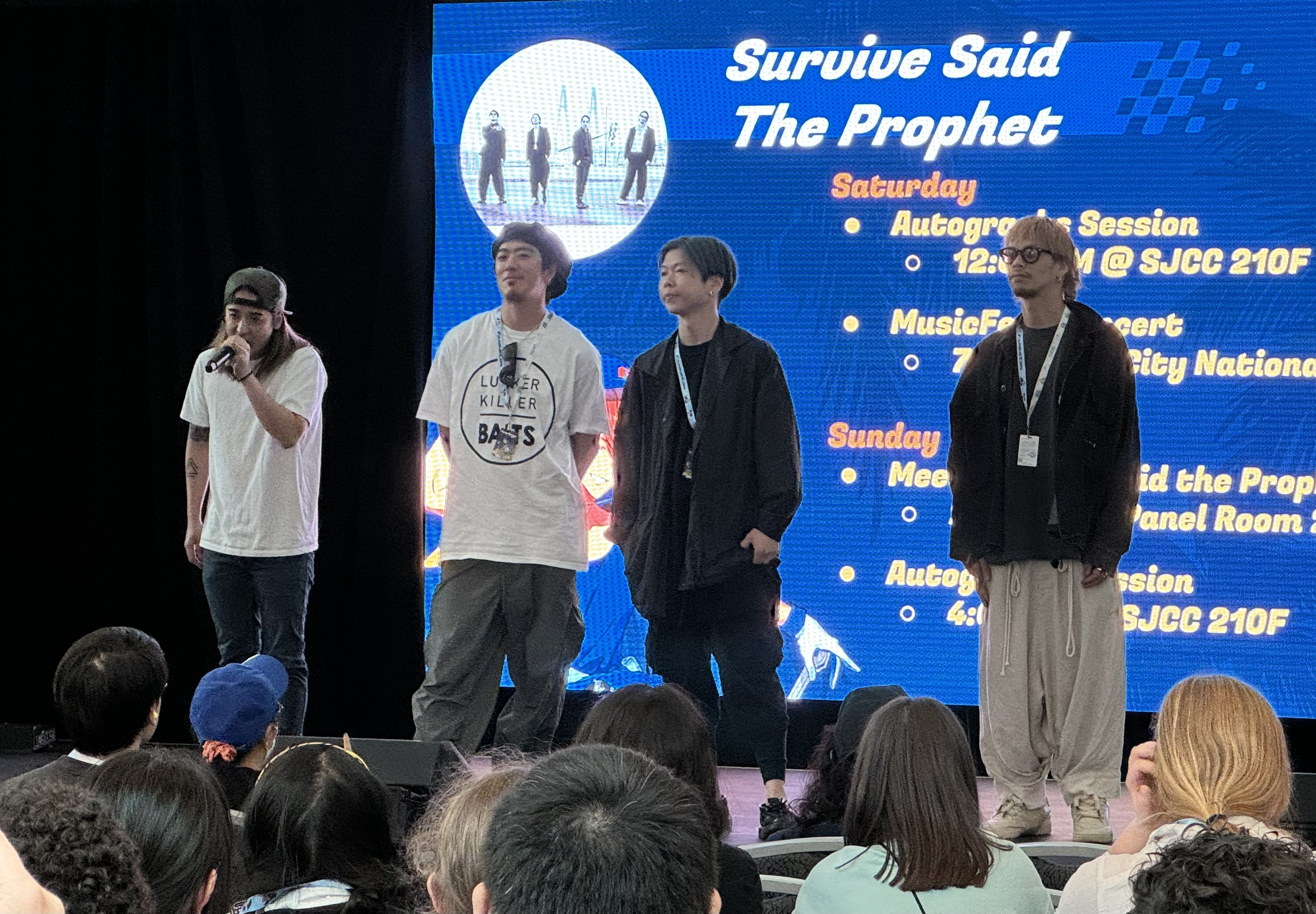
The band at FanimeCon in 2024

Yosh / Yoshi (Yoshiya Morita; born June 4, 1988) – clean vocals

Born in Tokyo, he attended an international school. After graduating, he attended Full Sail University in the United States. When he was a student, he was in the wrestling club and was also the president of the student council. He is an ex-member of the band Yesterday Fall. He uses Shure microphones. Yoshi also did the vocals for the ending theme of the anime, Seraph of the End.

Tatsuya (Tatsuya Kato; born July 11, 1989) – guitar

Born in Sendai, he and Yudai have known each other since elementary school. His hobbies are skateboarding, fishing, and muscle training. He is an ex-member of the band Fake Face. He plays a Schecter AR-06 (See Thru Black) guitar.

Show (Sho Okada, born November 21, 1989) – drums, unclean vocals

Born in Machida City, Tokyo, he studied karate and became a black belt in 5th grade. He began playing drums through DrumMania. He is an ex-member of the bands fly sleep fly and RAVAR, of which he was the leader, and a member of El Tempo. He has signed endorsement contracts with Pearl and Sabian. Since Yudai left the group, he has also served as a scream part.

=== Former members ===
Takuya Suzuki – guitar

He is an ex-member of the bands YesterdayFall and Moonwalk Street. He joined in 2015 but withdrew within the year.

Kei Tatsuno – drums

An ex-member of YesterdayFall.

Yudai Kato – bass, unclean vocals

An ex-member of the band Underland. Withdrew on April 2, 2021.

Ivan (Ivan Kwong; born October 25, 1988) – guitar.

Originally from Hong Kong, he came to Japan when he was 19 years old, and thus is fluent in Japanese, English, Cantonese, and Mandarin. Supper Moment's vocalist, Sunny Chan, is a childhood friend; he and Sunny performed together live on the streets of Hong Kong. In 2018, Survive Said The Prophet and Supper Moment reunited and co-produced the song "To Whom". He is an ex-member of the band Aphelion. He plays an Ibanez AZ224F-BIG guitar. He is also in charge of product sales and designing CD jackets. Withdrew on July 28, 2025.

=== Former support members ===
Yokochin – support drums

Ex-member of the band Angry Frog Rebirth.

Yuki Hanazawa – support bassist, dirty vocal

Currently active in Me;us.

Atsushi – support bassist

Currently active in Chasedown.

== Discography ==
=== Studio albums ===
List of studio albums, with selected chart positions
Title	Album details	Peak chart positions	
Title	Album details	JPN Oricon	JPN Billboard
Course of Action	Released: April 15, 2015; Label: 30 Lines Records; Formats: CD, digital download	—	—
Fixed	Released: October 5, 2016; Label: Zestone Records; Formats: CD, digital download	76	—
Wabi Sabi	Released: August 2, 2017; Label: Zestone Records; Formats: CD, digital download	42	61
Space[s]	Released: September 26, 2018; Label: Sony Music Records; Formats: CD, digital download	26	23
Inside Your Head	Released: January 15, 2020; Label: Sony Music Records; Formats: CD, digital download	11	10
Hateful Failures	Released: October 12, 2022; Label: Sony Music Records; Formats: CD, digital download	20	23
Luv Sux Sessions	Digital Release: September 3, 2025; CD Release: September 24, 2025; Label: Jisedai Inc.; Formats: CD, digital download		
"—" denotes items which did not chart.

=== Singles ===
List of singles, with selected chart positions
Title	Year	Peak positions		Album
Title	Year	JPN Oricon	JPN Hot 100	Album
Let Us Party	2011	—	—	Survive Said the Prophet
Meiam	2014	—	—	Non-album singles
Cocoon	2014	—	—	Non-album singles
Let It Die	2016	—	—	Fixed
Ne:One	2018	45	—	Space(s)
Hi｜Lo	2018	45	—	Non-album single
Found & Lost	2018	42	93	Space(s)
Red	2018	28	83	Inside Your Head
Common Sense	2019	—	—	Non-album singles
Things Unsaid	2019	—	—	Non-album singles
Closure	2019	—	—	Non-album singles
Mukanjyo	2019	45	—	Inside Your Head
Win / Lose	2021	40	—	Hateful Failures
Papersky	2022	40	—	Hateful Failures
Paradox	2023	—	—	Luv Sux Sessions
State of Mind feat. Matt Good (From First To Last)	2025	—	—	Luv Sux Sessions
Useless feat. Ryo Kinoshita From(Knosis)	2025	—	—	Luv Sux Sessions
X_AXIS	2025	—	—	Luv Sux Sessions
"—" denotes items which did not chart.

== Soundtrack appearances ==
Songs that appear on anime, video game soundtracks, and commercials
Title	Year	Appearance	Ref.
Let It Die	2016	PlayStation 4 official participation song for Let It Die	
Ne:One	2018	Theme song of the movie Code Geass Lelouch of the Rebellion III Imperial Road	
Found & Lost	2018	First opening theme of the anime Banana Fish	
Red	2018	Second ending theme of the anime Banana Fish	
Right and Left	2019	Honda Shuttle commercial song	
Mukanjyo	2019	First opening theme of the anime Vinland Saga (Season 1)	
Heroine	2020	NEC's Lavie Vega commercial song	
Calm:Unison	2020	"Wildish" frozen food commercial song	
Win / Lose	2022	Official theme song of the 2021–22 B.League season	
Papersky	2022	Opening theme of the anime Tokyo 24th Ward	
Find You	2022	Insert song of the anime Tokyo 24th Ward	
Paradox	2023	Second opening theme of the anime Vinland Saga (Season 2)	
X_AXIS	2025	Official theme song for the arcade game Mobile Suit Gundam Extreme Vs. 2 Infinite Boost	
Speak of the Devil	2026	Second ending theme of the anime Fire Force (Season 3)	

== Live performances ==
=== Japan Tours ===
Title	Event date	Comments	Ref.
Fixed Tour 2016–2017	November 11, 2016 – March 18, 2017	Participants NoisyCell / Mothball / Keep Your Hands Off My Girl / 10 Miles Wide / Airflip / Boiler Maker / Can't a Man Attack! / Crimson Crest / Emily Sugar / F.P / HenLee / Lost / Nim / Noisemaker / Rigel / Rocket of the Bulldogs / Take Mind's Place / The American Movie / To Overflow Evidence / Uunmask Alive / Waterweed	
Wabi Sabi Tour 2017	September 15 – October 19, 2017	Participants NoisyCell / Another Story / Coldrain / Hello Sleepwalkers / Her Name in Blood / Meaning / Red in Blue / Shadows / Unchain / She in the Display	
Magic Hour 2018 (sponsored event)	February 9–23, 2018	Participants Azami / Noisemaker	
Eclipse Tour (Crystal Lake × Survive Said The Prophet)	May 18–29, 2018	All 7 performances	
Ne:One Tour 2018	July 2–15, 2018	Participants Knock Out Monkey / Fomare / Newspeak / Spark!! Sound!! Show!! / Waterweed / Dizziness Siren	
VR Experience	September 7, 2018	Held at Zepp DiverCity	
Space[s] Tour 2018–19	October 5, 2018 – February 16, 2019	Participants Keep Your Hands Off My Girl / Noisemaker / Shadows / Tricot / Accident I Loved / Azami / Country Yard / Her Name in Blood / Newspeak / Northern19 / Praise / A Crowd of Rebellion / Creepy Nuts / ENTH / Five New Old / Foad / G-Freak Factory / Knock Out Monkey / Paledusk / Waterweed / Hysteric Panic / She in the Display	
Now More Than Ever Tour	March 26 – August 30, 2019	Participants Newspeak	
Now More Than Ever Tour Extra Show	July 7, 2019	Held at Pot Hall	
Made in Asia Tour	September 15 – December 9, 2019	Participants Fox Capture Plan / Hump Back / Knock Out Monkey / Lynch. / Newspeak / Nothing's Carved in Stone / Shadows / Six Lounge / Waterweed	
Inside Your Head Tour -this might be the last-	October 23 ー October 27, 2020		
Redefine Tour 2021	February 14–21, 2021	One Man Tour	
Hateful Failures Tour	October 21 − December 20, 2022		
TOUR 2023 “MAKE / BREAK YOURSELF”	July 1 – November 8, 2023		
TOUR 2024 Hold the Door Tour	September 21, 2024 – March 6, 2025	Participants CLARITY/ Back Drop Bomb / SeeYouSmile / ALI / YamaArashi / Trident / Crossfaith / ENTH / HIkage / The Bonez / Sable Hills	
State of Mind Tour	March 28 – April 26, 2025	One Man Tour	

=== World Tours ===
TOUR 2024 "MAKE / BREAK YOURSELF" America Tour	July 3–15, 2024	New York, Toronto, Chicago, Seattle, Berkeley, Los Angeles, San Diego
EU / UK Tour 2025	June 6–15, 2025	Rock am Ring, Rock im Park, Rock For People, Utrecht, London, Download Festival

=== Other performances ===
- May 4, 2013 – "Gold Rush 2013"
- May 19 – ROOKiEZ is PUNK'D presents "Bump on da Style Vol.22: Mixture Is Not Dead (Break of Dawn Tour Final)"
- November 15 – Clubdrop × Audioleaf × MAG System presents "Transit Vol 2"
- August 20, 2014 – "Faces Tour 2014" (Fake Face)
- October 3–4, 2014 – "Until the End Japan Tour 2014" (coldrain)
- October 26, 28, 31; 2014 – "Gravitation" Tour (2014–2015) (Girugamesh)
- December 9, 2014 – "Daylight Tree Bounenkai 2014" (Day 1)
- January 10, 12, 16, 18, 23, 25, 27; 2015 – "Redline Riot Tour 2015" (Crystal Lake, Noisemaker, Survive Said the Prophet, Wrong City)
- February 14, 2015 – "The Brotherhood Tour 2015"
- March 10, 2015 – "Magna Carta Tour" (Swanky Dank)
- March 11, 2015 – "Master Peace '15"
- March 14, 2015 – "Tenjin Ototaku" (Tenjin Ontaq)
- March 20, 2015 – "Monster Energy Outburn Tour 2015"
- February 6, 2023 – Hoobastank Japan Tour 2023 (Hoobastank)
- May 27, 2023 – Anime North 2023, Toronto
- July 13–16, 2023 – Anime Friends 2023 in São Paulo, Brazil (Survive Said The Prophet/ Takumi Hashimoto / Takumi Tsutsui / Hiroshi Watari / Mai Oishi / Makoto Sumikawa / Kiyomi Tsukada / Flow / Scandal / Burnout Syndromes / Nano / Yurika / ASCA / SennaRin / Who‐ya Extended / Yuyu20 / Yumi Matsuzawa / Danger3 (Ricardo Cruz, Larissa Tassi and Rodrigo Rossi) / Janaína Bianchi / Senpai Old School / Akino with Bless4)
- November 18, 2023 – Crunchyroll x Anime NYC - Night of Live Music (Survive Said The Prophet / Hiroyuki Sawano feat. SennaRin / Cö shu Nie
- March 27, 2024 - Flow The Party 2024
- May 24–27, 2024 – Fanimecon 2024 in San Jose, CA
- June 6, 2026 - Flow The Festival 2026
