= Rodrigo Rossi =

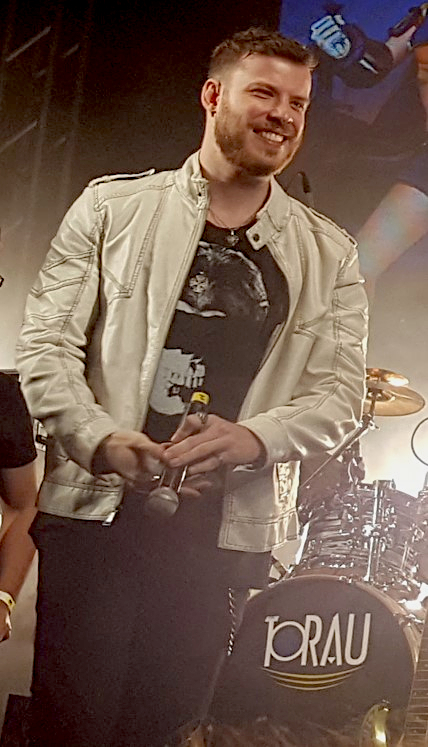
- Rossi performing at Anime Friends 2016

Background information
- Also known as: Rod Rossi
- Born: Rodrigo Rossi; January 10, 1987 (age 39); Rio de Janeiro, Brazil
- Genres: Heavy metal, anime song
- Occupation: Musician
- Instruments: Vocals, acoustic guitar
- Website: https://rodrossi.com/

Rodrigo Rossi, also known as Rod Rossi, is a Brazilian singer. After beginning his career in heavy metal bands Snake Eyes and Thorn, he was invited to sing the Brazilian Portuguese version of the opening of Saint Seiya: The Lost Canvas, which led him to shift his career focus to the production of anime songs in Brazil.

Since then, he has been touring all over Brazil singing Brazilian Portuguese versions of other anime to which he was invited, such as Dragon Ball Kai and Saint Seiya Omega.

In 2014, Rossi partnered with Edu Falaschi, Ricardo Cruz and Larissa Tassi to create Cavaleiros in Concert ("saints in concert"). They are all known for performing Brazil's opening and ending themes to several Saint Seiya anime, and the project consisted of a series of concerts where they all sang their songs and paid homage to Saint Seiya.

In 2016, Rossi took part in the V.A. Animes x Tokusatsu project, in which many artists banded together to play anime songs. Rossi, with Japanese singer Yama-B (former vocalist of Galneryus), recorded a version of Hironobu Kageyama's Soldier Dream, the second opening of Saint Seiya. The duo took the opportunity to record another track for the album Yama-B & Friends called When I Say Goodbye.

In 2017, Rossi returned to his heavy metal roots with the album Rec/All, produced by Renato Tribuzy (who also played in it), and special participations by Kiko Loureiro, Roy Z, Edu Ardanuy, Davis Ramay, Marcelo Barbosa, Felipe Andreoli, Marcelo Moreira, Pedro Tinello and Alessandro Del Vecchio.

In the same year, Rossi co-founded Danger3 with Larissa Tassi and Ricardo Cruz. The group is dedicated to the production of anime songs and have released four singles with songs inspired by manga published in Brazil, such as Akira and Your Name. The trio also recorded the Brazilian Portuguese versions for the opening and ending themes of Saint Seiya: Soul of Gold, and the song Space Runners, Go, from the Space Runners game.

In 2020, Rossi released ANNO: X, a compilation of all anime songs he was officially invited for.

He also started a career as a voice actor, having worked on the Brazilian adaptation of anime like Sakamichi no Apollon (Kids on the Slope), Kanojo mo Kanojo (Girlfriend, Girlfriend) and Maou Gakuin no Futekigousha (The Misfit of Demon King Academy).

== Discography ==
2017 Rec/All

2020 ANNO: X

== List of songs in anime and games ==
=== Saint Seiya: The Lost Canvas ===
- "O Reino de Atena" (Original: "The Realm of Athena", by EUROX)
- "Laços de Flor" (Original: "Hana no Kusari", by Maki Ikuno and Marina Del Ray) Obs: sung by Melissa Matos, Rossi worked adapting the lyrics and tends to sing it in his concerts.

=== Saint Seiya Omega ===
- "Pegasus Fantasy versão Ômega" (Original: "Pegasus Fantasy ver. Omega", by Shoko Nakagawa and MAKE-UP)
- "Evolução Ω" (Original: "Mirai Seitoshi Omega (Saint Evolution)", by Nagareda Project)
- "Cordas de Luz" (Original: "Senkou Strings," by Cyntia)
- "Nova Geração" (Original: "Next Generation", by Root Five)

Obs: All with Danger3 and Edu Falaschi, except "Pegasus Fantasy", sung with only Larissa Tassi)

=== Saint Seiya: Legend of Sanctuary ===
- "Hero" (Original by Yoshiki)

=== Saint Seiya: Soul of Gold ===
- "Soldier Dream versão Alma de Ouro" (Original: "Soldier Dream ver. Soul of Gold" by Root Five)
- "A Promessa do Amanhã" (Original: "Yakusoku No Asu E", by Root Five)

Obs: Both with Danger3.

=== Dragon Ball Kai ===
- "Dragon Soul" (Original by Takayoshi Tanimoto)
- "Yeah! Break! Care! Break!" (Original by Takayoshi Tanimoto)
- "Vou Lutar!" (Original: "Fight It Out!", by Masatoshi Ono)
- "Nunca Desista" (Original: "Never Give Up!!", by Junear)

=== Dragon Ball Super ===
- "Limit Break x Survivor" (Original by Kiyoshi Hikawa)
- "Hello! Hello! Hello!" (Original by Good Morning America)

=== Fairy Tail ===
- "Snow Fairy" (Original by Funkist)
- "Ft." (Original by Funkist)
- "Fiesta" (Original by +Plus)

=== Shingeki no Kyojin ===
"Guren no Yumiya" (Original by Linked Horizon)

=== Fatal Fury: The Motion Picture ===
- "Oh, Angel" (Original: "Yoake no Legend", by Kazukiyo Nishikiori)

Obs: Part of Rec/All

=== Street Fighter IV ===
- "THE NEXT DOOR -INDESTRUCTIBLE-" (Original by Exile)

Obs: Part of Rec/All
