= Anime Friends =

Convention in South America

- Status: Active
- Locations: São Paulo; Aeroporto Campo de Marte Buenos Aires; Centro de Exposiciones Miguelete Santiago; Centro de Eventos Chimkowe
- Country: Brazil; Argentina; Chile
- Inaugurated: 2003
- Attendance: 120,000 in 2008
- Website: Argentina's official website Brazil's official website Chile's official website

Anime Friends is a South American annual anime convention produced by Maru Division Corporation. It was originally held in São Paulo, Brazil during the month of July, and it expanded to Rio de Janeiro, Argentina (2009–17) and Chile (2013).

== History ==
=== Brazil ===
==== Event history ====
City	Dates	Venue	Attend.	Guests
São Paulo	July 3–6, 2003	Colégio Madre Cabrini	25,000	Hironobu Kageyama, Akira Kushida, Hiroshi Watari
São Paulo	July 8–11, 2004	Espaço das Américas	32,000	Masaaki Endoh, Hironobu Kageyama, Masami Okui, and Eizo Sakamoto
São Paulo	July 14–17, 2005	Universidade Uni Sant'Anna	45,000	Yoshiki Fukuyama, Hironobu Kageyama, Akira Kushida, and Takayuki Miyauchi
São Paulo	July 13–16, 2006	Universidade Uni Sant'Anna	50,000	Massacration, Masaaki Endoh, Hiroshi Kitadani, and Yumi Matsuzawa
São Paulo	July 14~15 and 19~22, 2007	Universidade Uni Sant'Anna	79,000	Masaaki Endoh, Edu Falaschi, Yoko Ishida, Hironobu Kageyama, MoJo, Pato Fu, Kōji Wada, and Nobuo Yamada
São Paulo	July 11~13 and 16~20, 2008	Mart Center	120,000	Akira Kushida, Takayuki Miyauchi, Takumi Tsutsui, Hideaki Takatori, Almah, Shaaman, Aki Misato, JAM Project (Hironobu Kageyama, Masaaki Endoh, Yoshiki Fukuyama, Masami Okui, Hiroshi Kitadani and Ricardo Cruz)
São Paulo	July 10~12 and 17–19, 2009	Mart Center		Kagrra, Hironobu Kageyama, Masaaki Endoh, Hiroshi Kitadani, Nobuo Yamada, Akira Kushida, Shinichi Ishihara and Yukio Yamagata
São Paulo	July 09~11 and 15~18, 2010	Mart Center		Akira Kushida, Shinichi Ishihara, Takayuki Miyauchi, Aki Misato, Minami Kuribayashi, Chihiro Yonekura, Angra, Piyo Rabbie and Aural Vampire
São Paulo	July 08~10 and 15~17, 2011	Mart Center		Akira Kushida, Psychic Lover, Nobuo Yamada, Takayoshi Tanimoto, M.O.V.E., Kaya and Angra
São Paulo	July 05–08 and 12-15, 2012	Faculdade Cantareira		Nobuo Yamada, Takayoshi Tanimoto, Paul Zaloom, Kaya and JAM Project (Hironobu Kageyama, Masaaki Endoh, Masami Okui, Hiroshi Kitadani and Ricardo Cruz - Yoshiki Fukuyama was unable to attend due to health issues)
São Paulo	July 11–14 and 18-21, 2013	Campo de Marte Airport		Nobuo Yamada, Akira Kushida, Família Lima, Yumi Matsuzawa, Gloria, Andre Matos, Eyeshine, Chihiro Yonekura, Oreskaband, Shinichi Ishihara, Takumi Tsutsui and JAM Project (Hironobu Kageyama, Masaaki Endoh, Masami Okui, Hiroshi Kitadani, Yoshiki Fukuyama and Ricardo Cruz
São Paulo	July 17–20 and 24-27, 2014	Campo de Marte Airport		Flow, Reika, You Kikkawa, Oreskaband, Kōji Wada, Ayumi Miyazaki, Takayoshi Tanimoto, Noturnall, Almah, Motsu, Back-On, Nobuo Yamada, Eizo Sakamoto, Família Lima, Chris Claremont and Daniel HDR
São Paulo	July 10–12 and 17-19, 2015	Campo de Marte Airport		Ayu Brazil, Flow, Cross Gene, Detonator, Home Made Kazoku, Inkt, Joe Inoue, Kaname, Reika, Matsuko Mawatari, Ricardo Cruz, Sasaki Sayaka, Screw, Snowkel, Tetsuo Kurata, Carolina Munhóz, Raphael Draccon and Daniel HDR
São Paulo	July 08–10 and 15-17, 2016	Campo de Marte Airport		Joe Inoue, Ricardo Cruz, Detonator, Nobuo Yamada, Ayumi Miyazaki, Takayoshi Tanimoto, Yumi Matsuzawa, Hiroki Takahashi. Yuuya Asaoka, Ricardo Fábio, Edu Falaschi, Rodrigo Rossi, Larissa Tassi, LM.C, Mai Hoshimura, Sambomaster, Takumi Tsutsui, Shouhei Kusaka, LeChat, Liui Aquino, Jason Faunt
São Paulo	July 07–09, 2017	Transamerica Expo Center		Do As Infinity, T.M. Revolution, Asian Kung-fu Generation, Takumi Tsutsui
São Paulo	July 06–09, 2018	Anhembi Convention Center		Takumi Hashimoto, Oreskaband, Yumi Matsuzawa, Snowkel, Deadlift Lolita, Hatsune Miku, Ultraman Heroes
Rio de Janeiro	July 05-09, 2019	Riocentro		Snowkel, Faky, Yumi Matsuzawa, Deadlift Lolita, Mika Kobayashi, Gaijin Sentai, Senpai Old School, Takumi Hashimoto
São Paulo	July 12-14, 2019	Anhembi Convention Center	60,000	Snowkel, Faky, Yumi Matsuzawa, Deadlift Lolita, Mika Kobayashi, Gaijin Sentai, Senpai Old School, Takumi Hashimoto
-	2020	-	-	Event not held due to the COVID-19 pandemic
-	2021	-	-	Event not held due to the COVID-19 pandemic
São Paulo	July 08-10, 2022	Anhembi Convention Center	80,000	Danger3 (Ricardo Cruz, Larissa Tassi and Rodrigo Rossi), Gaijin Sentai, Babybeard, Matsuko Mawatari, Diogo Miyahara, I Don't Like Mondays., YUYU20, Senpai Old School, One n' Only
Rio de Janeiro	July 16-17, 2022	Expo Mag		Danger3 (Ricardo Cruz, Larissa Tassi and Rodrigo Rossi), Gaijin Sentai, Babybeard, Matsuko Mawatari, Diogo Miyahara, I Don't Like Mondays., YUYU20, Senpai Old School, One n' Only
São Paulo	July 13-16, 2023	Anhembi Convention Center	120,000	Takumi Hashimoto, Takumi Tsutsui, Hiroshi Watari, Mai Oishi, Makoto Sumikawa, Kiyomi Tsukada, Flow, Scandal, Burnout Syndromes, Survive Said the Prophet, Nano, Yurika, ASCA, SennaRin, Who-ya Extended, YUYU20, Yumi Matsuzawa, Danger3 (Ricardo Cruz, Larissa Tassi and Rodrigo Rossi), Janaína Bianchi, Senpai Old School, Akino with Bless4
São Paulo	July 18-21, 2024	Anhembi Convention Center		Vickeblanka, Takeru (from SuG), Hiroto (from Alice Nine), Wasuta, ROOKiEZ is PUNK’D, MHRap, Sidney Scaccio, Yasuhiro Ishiwatari, Mayumi Yoshida, ALI, ClariS, Kihachirō Uemura, Masaru Yamashita, Koichi Nakayama
São Paulo	July 03-06, 2025	Anhembi Convention Center	150,000	Nightmare , MindaRyn, Flow, Ricardo Cruz , Big Ocean, Scandal, YUYU20

=== Argentina ===
==== Event Story ====
Dates	Location	Atten.	Guests
July 24~26, 2009	Colegio Nichia Gakuin; Buenos Aires, Argentina		Hironobu Kageyama, Masaaki Endoh, Hiroshi Kitadani and Ricardo Cruz
July 24~25, 2010	Instituto San Antonio; Buenos Aires, Argentina		Aki Misato, Chihiro Yonekura, Kouji Wada, Ricardo Cruz and Aural Vampire
July 23~24, 2011	Instituto San Antonio; Buenos Aires, Argentina		Takayoshi Tanimoto, Nobuo Yamada, Ricardo Cruz, m.o.v.e and Kaya
July 21~23, 2012	Centro de Exposiciones Miguelete; Buenos Aires, Argentina		JAM Project (Hironobu Kageyama, Masaaki Endoh, Hiroshi Kitadani, Masami Okui and Ricardo Cruz)
July 19~21, 2013	Centro de Exposiciones Miguelete; Buenos Aires, Argentina		Nobuo Yamada and Yumi Matsuzawa
July 18~20, 2014	Centro de Exposiciones Miguelete; Buenos Aires, Argentina		Oreskaband
July 24~26, 2015	Centro de Exposiciones Miguelete; Buenos Aires, Argentina		FLOW
July 22~24, 2016	Centro de Exposiciones Miguelete; Buenos Aires, Argentina		Joe Inoue, Nobuo Yamada and Yumi Matsuzawa
July 21~23, 2017	Centro de Exposiciones Miguelete; Buenos Aires, Argentina		ROOKiEZ is PUNK’D

=== Chile ===
==== Event Story ====
Dates	Location	Atten.	Guests
July 27, 2013	Teatro Caupolicán; Santiago, Chile		Juan Andrés Salfate, Ricardo Cruz and Chihiro Yonekura

== See also ==
- List of anime conventions
