= Pia Arena MM =

Music arena in Yokohama, Japan

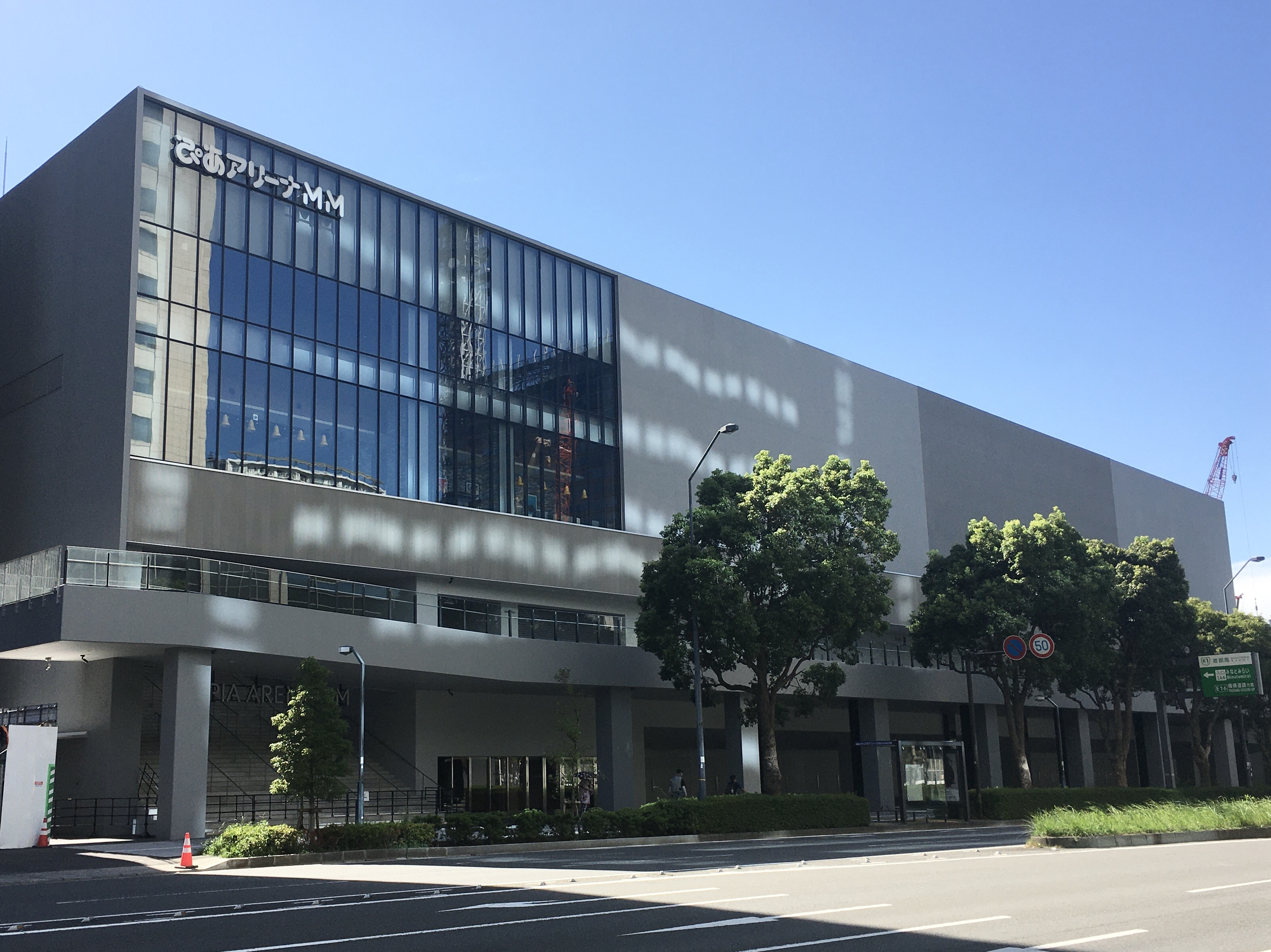
- Pia Arena MM in 2020
- Interactive map of Pia Arena MM
- Location: Yokohama, Kanagawa, Japan
- Coordinates: 35°27′21″N 139°37′43″E
- Owner: Pia Corporation
- Capacity: 12,141

Construction
- Opened: 2020

Pia Arena MM (ぴあアリーナMM) is a dedicated music arena in Minatomirai, Nishi-ku, Yokohama, Kanagawa Prefecture, Japan, operated by Pia Corporation. It has a capacity of 12,141 people.

== History ==
In July 2017, PIA, a ticket sales company, announced plans for a large-scale music arena with four floors and a seating capacity of 10,000 (when seated) in the 38th district of the Minato Mirai district (along Minato Mirai Boulevard). Construction by Sato Kogyo began in December of the same year and was completed in March 2020. Before the official name was decided, the arena was tentatively called "Pia MM Arena".

The opening performance was originally scheduled for April 25, 2020, by Yuzu from Yokohama as part of their national arena tour, but was postponed due to the COVID-19 pandemic (other artists' performances were similarly postponed or canceled due to the declaration of a state of emergency under the revised Law Concerning Special Measures). After that, the arena decided that its opening date would be July 10, 2020.

The first audience-accessible performance was Ryo Nishikido's fan meeting (held on August 1 and 2 of the same year).

One of the stated purposes for constructing this arena was to address the shortage of arenas that became a problem leading up to the 2020 Summer Olympics and Paralympics. Furthermore, it is not usual for a private company to operate an arena on its own.

The defining feature in this arena is that, while primarily focused on music concerts, it does not limit itself to any particular genre of performance. Furthermore, it aims to be a new type of music arena that considers factors such as the intimacy between the performers and the audience, enhanced sound and lighting environments, and efficient equipment transport. In addition, a cafe and lounge will be added, allowing people to eat and drink inside the arena.

This arena is not a permanent facility; it will be operated on land owned by Mitsubishi Estate, with PIA leasing the land for a fixed term of approximately 30 years.

In August 2022, the fan meeting of the Thai channel GMMTV was held including some of its main artists such as Bright, Win, Ohm, Nanon, Tay, New, Krist, Earth, Mix, Dew and Nani. In November 2022, the arena hosted the professional debut of the two-time Olympic figure skating gold medalist Yuzuru Hanyu with the solo show Prologue.

The arena has hosted many "solo live" concerts for Hololive Production VTubers, such as FBKingdom "ANTHEM" for Shirakami Fubuki in February 2025, followed by the "PERSONYA RESPECT" for Nekomata Okayu in May 2025. In September 2025, Ookami Mio held her first solo live named "Our Sparkle" at the arena, followed by AZKi's "Deperture" in November.

== Concerts ==
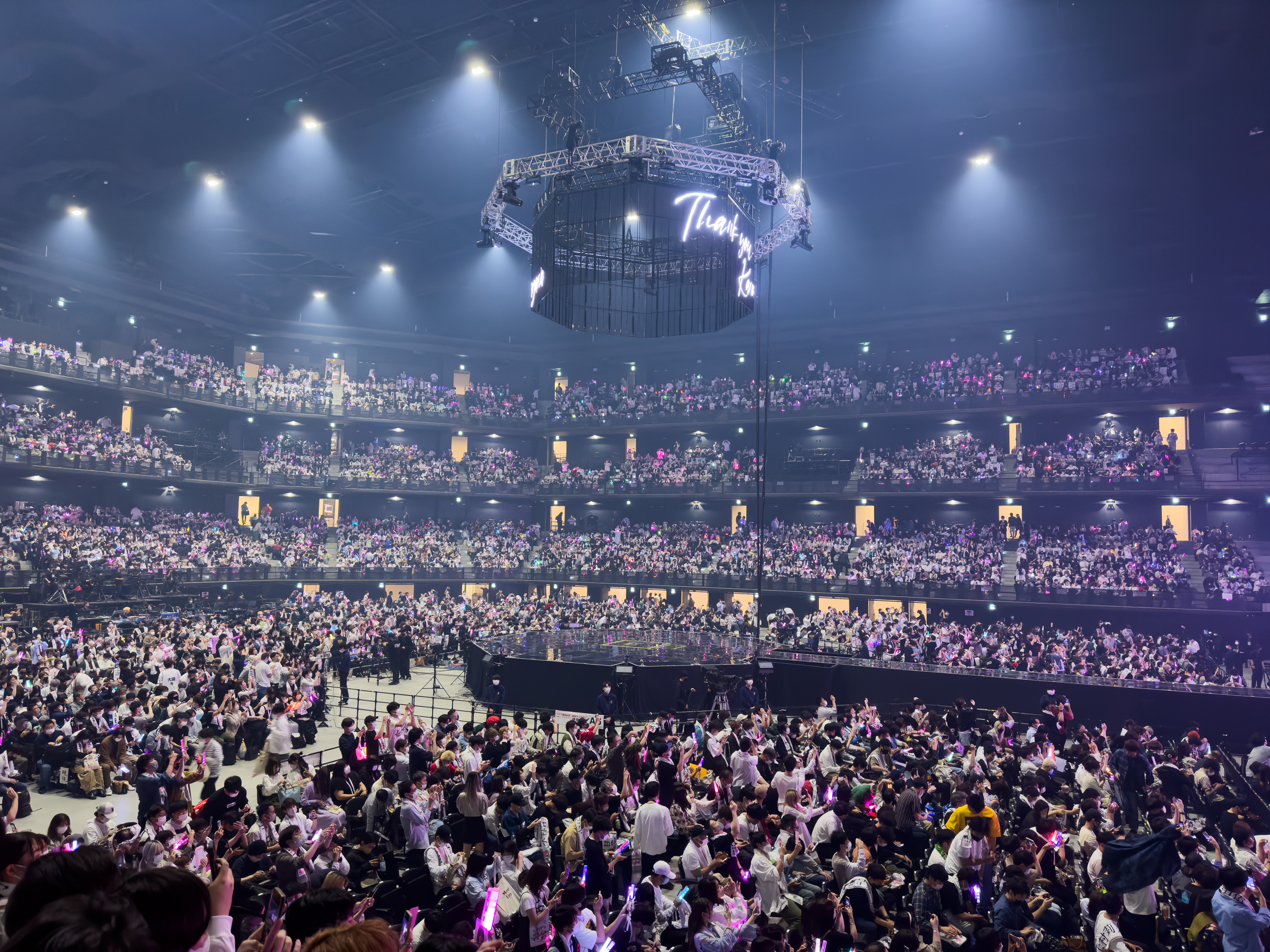
The inside of Pia Arena MM, when set up for a concert

Concerts held at the Pia Arena MM
Date	Artist	Event
2023
April 1	Babymetal	BABYMETAL BEGINS - THE OTHER ONE
April 2	Babymetal	BABYMETAL BEGINS - THE OTHER ONE
May 3	Red Velvet	R to V Tour
May 4	Red Velvet	R to V Tour
May 6	WayV	Japan 2023 "The First Vision"
May 7	WayV	Japan 2023 "The First Vision"
June 2	Suga	D-Day Tour
June 3	Suga	D-Day Tour
June 4	Suga	D-Day Tour
June 23	Yoasobi	Denkōsekka Arena Tour
June 24	Yoasobi	Denkōsekka Arena Tour
July 25	MiSaMo	Japan Showcase "Masterpiece"
July 26	MiSaMo	Japan Showcase "Masterpiece"
July 27	MiSaMo	Japan Showcase "Masterpiece"
September 2	Yamashita Tomohisa	-Sweet Vision- Arena Tour
September 3	Yamashita Tomohisa	-Sweet Vision- Arena Tour
September 16	Treasure	Fanmeeting Hello Again
September 17	Treasure	Fanmeeting Hello Again
September 18	Treasure	Fanmeeting Hello Again
2024
February 2	The Boyz	Zeneration 2nd World Tour
February 3	The Boyz	Zeneration 2nd World Tour
July 6	Treasure	Fanmeeting Wonderland
July 7	Treasure	Fanmeeting Wonderland
July 13	LE SSERAFIM	Fan Meeting 'Fearnada'
July 14	LE SSERAFIM	Fan Meeting 'Fearnada'
July 15	LE SSERAFIM	Fan Meeting 'Fearnada'
July 27	Kim Jae-joong	"FLOWER GARDEN" Asia Tour
July 28	Kim Jae-joong	"FLOWER GARDEN" Asia Tour
August 3	Do Kyung-soo	Asia Fan Concert Tour BLOOM
August 4	Do Kyung-soo	Asia Fan Concert Tour BLOOM
August 10	The Boyz	The Boyz Zeneration II World Tour
August 11	The Boyz	The Boyz Zeneration II World Tour
September 21	INI	[FLIP THE CIRCLE] Fan-con Tour
September 22	INI	[FLIP THE CIRCLE] Fan-con Tour
September 23	INI	[FLIP THE CIRCLE] Fan-con Tour
November 30	Hinatazaka46	Akari Nibu's graduation ceremony (esports event and concert)
December 1	Hinatazaka46	Akari Nibu's graduation ceremony (esports event and concert)
2025
January 18	Riize	『RIIZE︓The Secret LIEZ』FanMeeting
January 19	Riize	『RIIZE︓The Secret LIEZ』FanMeeting
February 1	Kroi	Kroi "Unspoil" Live Tour
February 8	EXO-CBX	Japan FANMEETING Get, Set, Go!
February 9	EXO-CBX	Japan FANMEETING Get, Set, Go!
February 15	INFINITE	15th ANNIVERSARY CONCERT 'LIMITED EDITION' Asia Tour
February 16	INFINITE	15th ANNIVERSARY CONCERT 'LIMITED EDITION' Asia Tour
February 18	Keshi	REQUIEM Tour
February 19	Keshi	REQUIEM Tour
March 14	Babymonster	Hello Monsters World Tour
March 15	Babymonster	Hello Monsters World Tour
March 16	Babymonster	Hello Monsters World Tour
April 26	DAY6	"Forever Young" World Tour
April 27	DAY6	"Forever Young" World Tour
May 24	Aespa	MY-J presents aespa JAPAN FANMEETING 2025 “To MY WORLD”
May 25	Aespa	MY-J presents aespa JAPAN FANMEETING 2025 “To MY WORLD”
July 5	Kara	KARA THE 6th JAPAN TOUR 2025 "KARASIA: MAGICAL WORLD"
July 6	Kara	KARA THE 6th JAPAN TOUR 2025 "KARASIA: MAGICAL WORLD"
August 10	illit	ILLIT GLITTER DAY: IN JAPAN [FIRST FANMEETING]
August 11	illit	ILLIT GLITTER DAY: IN JAPAN [FIRST FANMEETING]
August 30	Daesung	D's WAVE Asia Tour
August 31	Daesung	D's WAVE Asia Tour

Festivals held at the Pia Arena MM
Date	Event	Performer(s)
2020
September 19	JAM Project 20th Anniversary Special JAM FES. <JAPAN ANISONG MEETING FESTIVAL>	JAM Project, Ali Project, angela, Flow, Granrodeo
2022
November 23	REDLINE ALL THE REVENGE Supported by M	Age Factory, BiSH, Blue Encount, Coldrain, Creep Hyp, Dragon Ash, Fear, and Loathing in Las Vegas, Haruka Mirai, Hey-Smith, Shadows, Tempalay, The Bonez, The Forever Young, The Oral Cigarettes, Vaundy, Wagamama Rakia, Totem Pole
2024
July 29	FLOW THE FESTIVAL 2024	Flow, Granrodeo, Kana-Boon, Keytalk, Masayoshi Oishi, Spyair, From Argonavis Special Band, Real Akiba Boyz, DJ Pierre Nakano, and more.
July 30	FLOW THE FESTIVAL 2024	Flow, Burnout Syndromes, Creepy Nuts, JAM Project, Orange Range, Scandal, Rookiez Is Punk'd, O-Menz, DJ Caesar, and more.
November 2	SiM 20TH ANNiVERSARY "20YEARS"	SiM, Crossfaith, Man With A Mission, ~~The Oral Cigarettes~~, YamaArashi
November 3	SiM 20TH ANNiVERSARY "20YEARS"	SiM, 04 Limited Sazabys, Coldrain, Hey-Smith, Maximum The Hormone
2025
July 14	FLOW THE FESTIVAL 2025	Flow, Argonavis, Does, ReoNa, Sambomaster, Sukima Switch, Yasuharu Takanashi & yaiba, Madkid, DJ Kevin Mitsunaga, and more.
July 15	FLOW THE FESTIVAL 2025	Flow, Back-On, Blue Encount, flumpool, Granrodeo, OxT, Spira Spica, Hisashi, Real Akiba Boyz, DJ Kazu, and more.
2026
July 6	FLOW THE FESTIVAL 2026	Flow, Granrodeo, Home Made Kazoku, Raise A Suilen, Survive Said The Prophet, Uchikubi Gokumon Doukoukai, SunSet Swish, DJ Koo, Project Leap!, and more.
July 7	FLOW THE FESTIVAL 2026	Flow, 9mm Parabellum Bullet, angela, CHiCO with HoneyWorks, Frederic, Orange Range, Real Akiba Boyz & Real Akiba Band feat. Spira Spica, DJ Meguchee, Anatashia, and more.

== See also ==
- List of indoor arenas in Japan
