= Snorkel =

Snorkel may refer to:

== Mechanical arrangements for conveying gases or fluids ==
- Snorkel (swimming), a breathing tube for swimmers or divers and its use in the activity of snorkeling
- Submarine snorkel, for submersible ships/boats
- Vehicle snorkel, for insignificantly buoyant submersible vehicles
- An aerial platform for fire engines
- Sheaffer Snorkel fountain pen, a fountain pen piston filling scheme
- A refill tube for a water tank fitted to the Sikorsky S-64 Skycrane

== Other ==
- Sergeant Snorkel, a character in Beetle Bailey comics
- The Snorkel, a 1958 British film
- Snorkel parka, a type of anorak

== See also ==
- Snorkel diving
- Snorkeling
- Snowkel, rock band from Odaiba, Japan
- Snorks, cartoon about snorkel-bearing creatures
