= Danger3 =

Brazilian band

- Origin: Brazil
- Genre: Anisong
- Works: Neo Tokyo; Lembranças; Space Runners, Go; Somos Heróis; Yume
- Years active: 2017–present
- Members: Ricardo Cruz, Larissa Tassi, Rodrigo Rossi
- Website: www.danger3.com

Danger3 (pronounced “Danger San”) is a Brazilian band focused on the production of songs based on anime and Japanese pop culture in general. The all-vocalist trio is formed by JAM Project's Ricardo Cruz, Rodrigo Rossi and Larissa Tassi.

The group was founded in 2017 when they released their first single in a partnership with Brazilian manga-publishing company JBC, which was releasing Katsuhiro Otomo's Akira in Brazil. The single had three songs inspired by the world of Akira, including the title one called "Neo Tokyo". The following year, they released "Space Runners, Go", theme of Brainstorm Chimp's game Space Runners. Still in 2018, they partnered with JBC again to release "Yume", in honor of its founder. The partnership bore more fruit with the song "Somos Heróis" (we are heroes), theme for the Combo Rangers comic book "Somos Iguais" (we are the same); and with "Lembranças", to celebrate the release of Makoto Shinkai's Your Name's movie and manga in Brazil.

In 2020, the trio was responsible for the Brazilian Portuguese versions of the opening and ending themes of Saint Seiya: Soul of Gold.

Since its creation, the trio has performed all over Brazil in events like Anime Friends and Anime Summit.

== Discography ==
=== Singles ===
- 2017 Neo Tokyo (inspired by Akira)
- 2017 Lembranças (inspired by Your Name)
- 2018 Space Runners, Go (from Space Runners)
- 2018 Somos Heróis (from Combo Rangers: Somos Iguais)
- 2018 Yume

=== Other releases ===
- Soldier Dream ver. Soul of Gold (BR-PT) (Original by Root Five)
- A Promessa do Amanhã (tomorrow's promise) (Original: Yakusoku No Asu E, by Root Five)
