= Família Lima =

Brazilian band

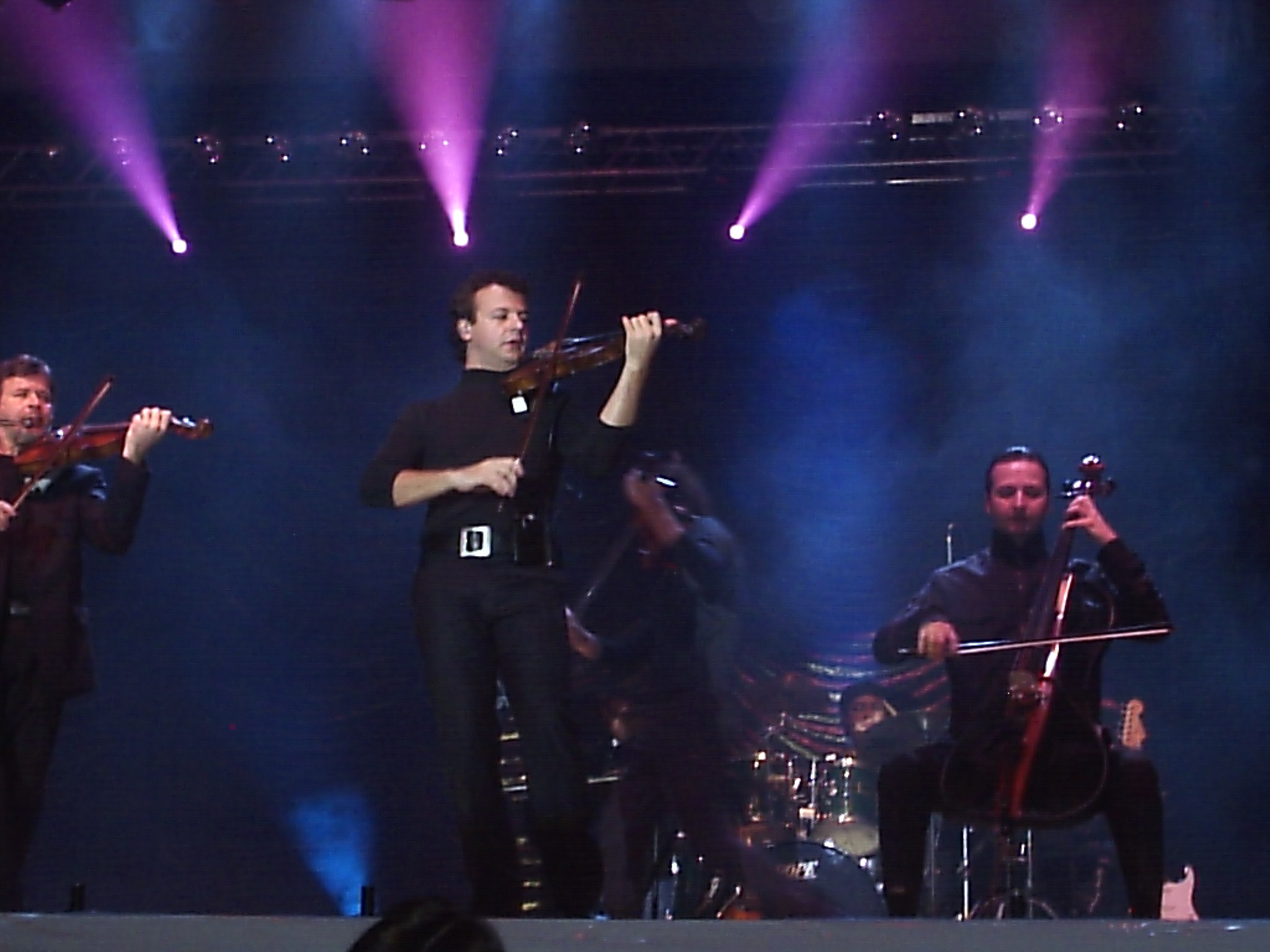

Background information
- Origin: Sapiranga, Rio Grande do Sul, Brazil
- Genres: Classical music Symphonic rock Pop rock Jazz
- Years active: 1994-present
- Labels: Som Livre; Abril Music; ACIT; Universal Music
- Members: Allen Lima; Amon-Rá Lima; Lucas Lima; Moisés Lima; Zeca Lima
- Website: www.familialima.com.br

Família Lima (lit. Lima Family) is a Brazilian band from Rio Grande do Sul state. As the name suggests, all members are part of the Lima family.

== Members ==
- Lucas Lima: lead vocals, electric guitar, acoustic guitar, viola, western concert flute, violin, bassoon
- Zeca Lima: cavaquinho, acoustic guitar, violin
- Allen Lima: keyboards
- Moisés Lima: bass, cello
- Amon-Rá Lima: violin

== Discography ==
Ano	Álbum	Formatos	Gravadora
1997	Família Lima	CD	Som Livre
1999	Ao Vivo	CD	Som Livre
2000	Pra Você	CD	Abril Music
2001	Gira o Mundo	CD	Abril Music
2003	Italiano	CD	Abril Music
2004	10 Anos - Ao Vivo em Gramado	CD, DVD	ACIT
2007	Carmina Burana	CD	ACIT
2010	1, 2, 3, 4, 5	CD	Self-released
2013	Raízes	DVD	ACIT
2015	20 Anos	CD, DVD	Universal Music
2016	Natal em Casa	CD, DVD	Universal Music
