= Rookiez Is Punk'd =

Japanese band

ROOKiEZ is PUNK’D
- Origin: Japan
- Genres: Alternative rock; rap rock; punk rock; pop rock
- Years active: 2006–2019, 2023–present
- Members: Shinnosuke; Ryota; U
- Past members: Ko-sk; Tsuyoshi; 2Rash; Takumi
- Website: www.rookizispunkd-official.com

Rookiez Is Punk'd (stylized as ROOKiEZ is PUNK’D) is a Japanese rock band. The current lineup consists of vocalist and guitarist Shinnosuke, bassist Ryota, and drummer U. Formed in 2006, they have made songs for many popular anime including Durarara!!, Yowamushi Pedal, and Blue Exorcist.

== History ==
In 2010, the band released their first single, "Complication", which was eventually used as the second opening of the anime Durarara!!. In a week, the song featured the most downloads and peaked at eleventh in the Oricon Singles Chart. Eventually, the band's song "Drop" was featured in the video game Durarara!! 3-way Standoff. In 2011, the band released the album DRRROOKiEZ!! -ROOKiEZ is PUNK’D respect for DRRR!!. Their singles "In My World", "Song for...", and "Reclimb" were also used as theme songs for the anime series Blue Exorcist, Bleach, and Yowamushi Pedal, respectively.

The band performed exclusively in Japan until May 2013, when they played at FanimeCon in San Jose, California.

In 2017, they played in Brazil for the first time at Super-Con, in Recife. The following year, they came to the country again, this time in São Paulo opening for SPYAIR.

In 2019, the band entered a hiatus due to disagreements which lasted four years.

In February 2023, the band said it would resume its activities after hiatus since 2019. As of 2023, the band has announced that their drummer, U, through social media and when spoken to on social media, was explaining that he is stepping down as the drummer for the band without any reason given and is currently unavailable, however; he is currently pursuing other musical endeavors, while the band currently has support drummers on tour. There is no exact time frame on U's return.

In 2024, the band returns to Brazil to perform at Anime Friends.

== Members ==
- Shinnosuke – vocals, guitar
- Ryota – bass
- U – drums (inactive)

== Former members ==
- Ko-sk – guitar
- Tsuyoshi – drums
- 2Rash – bass
- Takumi – guitar

== Discography ==
=== Studio albums ===
- From Dusk Till Dawn (July 25, 2012)
- The Sun Also Rises (September 12, 2018)
