= Good Morning America (band) =

Japanese rock band

- Origin: Japan
- Genres: Rock

Good Morning America (グッドモーニングアメリカ) is a Japanese rock band. Their album inトーキョーシティ ("In Tokyo City") reached the 7th place on the Weekly Oricon Albums Chart and their single "Haikei, Tsuratsusutora" reached the 8th place on the Weekly Oricon Singles Chart. "Haikei, Tsuratsusutora" is also an ending song for the Dragon Ball Kai anime television series, and their song "Hello Hello Hello" is the first ending song of the Dragon Ball Super anime television series.

== Discography ==
=== Albums ===
Release date	Title	Oricon (Note: Peak ranking on the weekly Oricon Albums Chart.)	Ref.
October 13, 2010	空ばかり見ていた	225	
July 20, 2011	ウォールペーパーミュージックじゃ踊りたくないぜ	158	
May 9, 2012	輝く方へ	45	
May 8, 2013	未来へのスパイラル	11	
October 22, 2014	inトーキョーシティ	7	
October 28, 2015	グッドモーニングアメリカ	21	

=== Singles ===
Release date	Title	Oricon (Note: Peak ranking on the weekly Oricon Singles Chart.)	Ref.
January 8, 2014	"イチ、ニッ、サンでジャンプ"	14	
May 6, 2014	"Haikei, Tsuratsusutora" (拝啓、ツラツストラ)	8	
June 10, 2015	"コピペ"	25	
August 12, 2015	"Hello Hello Hello" (ハローハローハロー)	42	
October 16, 2019	"Full Throttle" (フルスロットル)	46	

== DVDs ==
Release date	Title	Oricon (Note: Peak ranking on the weekly Oricon DVD Chart.)	Ref.
January 8, 2014	「未来へのスパイラルツアー2013」ファイナル@渋谷O-EAST 2013.10.05	12	
June 10, 2015	「inトーキョーシティツアー2014-2015」ファイナル@Zepp Tokyo 2015.03.22	21	
March 23, 2016	挑戦 ■七夜@日本武道館 2015.11.27	50	
