= Snowkel =

Japanese rock band

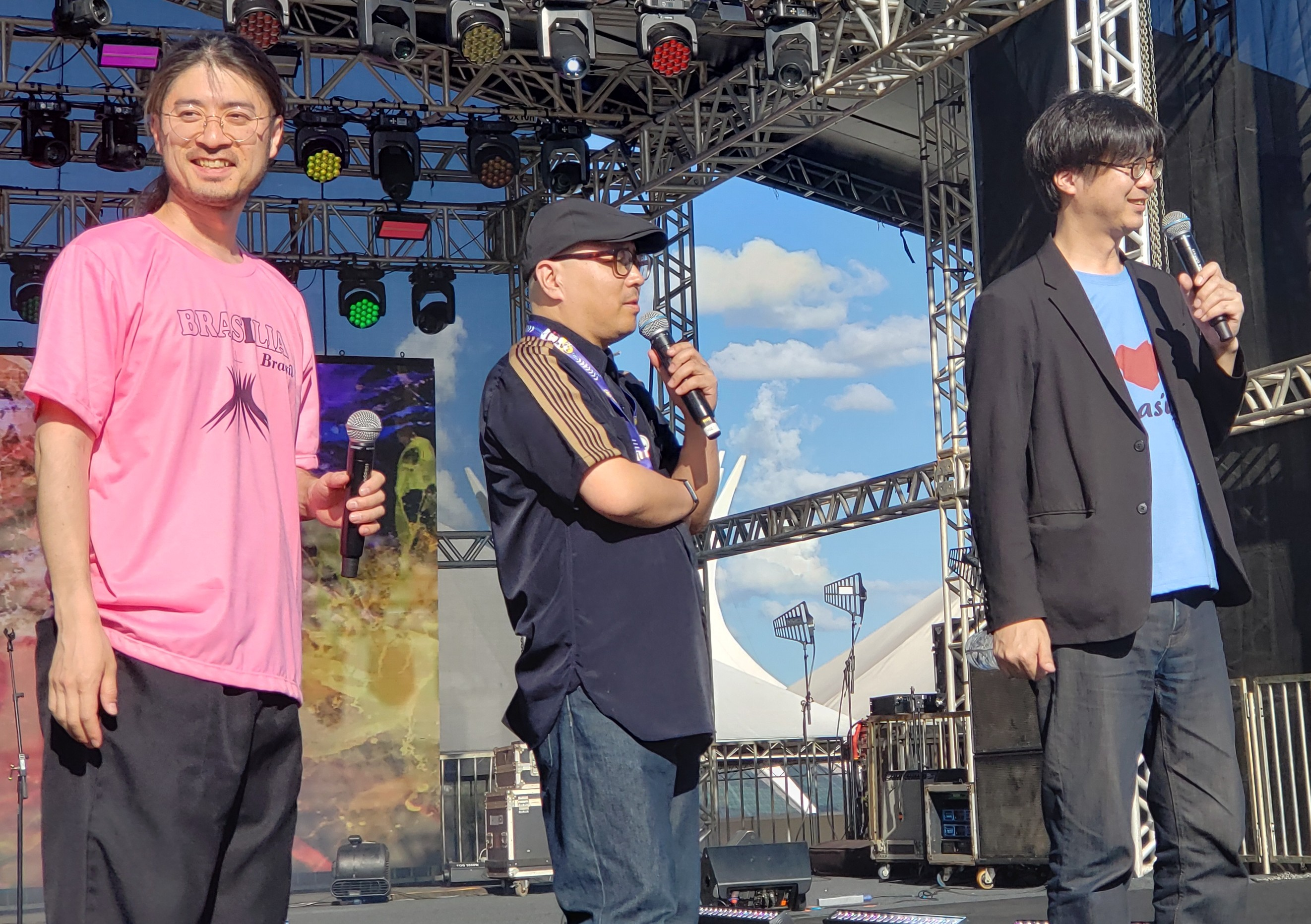
- Snowkel at Anime Summit in Brasília 2026

Background information
- Origin: Fukuoka, Japan
- Genres: Alternative rock; pop rock
- Years active: 2004–2010, 2014-present
- Label: Sony Music Japan
- Members: Kaba; Nishi; Yama
- Website: snowkel.net

Snowkel (シュノーケル, Shunōkeru) is a Japanese rock band from Fukuoka, Japan. Its members are Kaba, Nishi, and Yama.

== History ==
Immediately after forming in January 2004, their height of degree of completion of music is appraised and acquires a grand prix in the audition of local end in Fukuoka. After that, Snowkel focused on live activity in Fukuoka.

In December 2004, Snowkel had their first live gig in Fukuoka where they sold independent production board CD of themselves. In 2005, still focused on live activity, Snowkel produced a D board mini-album called "Sora Colorful" (ソラカラフル, Sora Karafuru) and released their debut single "Ooki Na Mizutamari" (大きな水たまり).

In 2006, the band earned a major record label deal with Sony Music Japan and released their first studio album called SNOWKEL SNORKEL on April 26, 2006. Snowkel Snorkel contains their released singles "Tabibito Beginner", "Namikaze Satellite", and "Ooki Na Mizutamari".

On October 3, 2007, their second album EQ was released featuring songs from their singles: "Solar Wind", "Bye-Bye×Hello", "Tenkiyohō" and "Kiseki"; along with 8 new songs for a total of 12 songs. Their songs feature in a few anime series:

- "Namikaze Satellite" as the seventh opening for Naruto
- "Solar Wind" as the second ending for Kiba
- "Kiseki" as the sixth ending for Gintama.

Their third album, EYE, was released at December 15, 2015, after reunited back in 2014.

== Members ==
- Nishimura Shinya "Nishi" (guitar, vocals)
- Kabamura Masami "Kaba" (bass)
- Yamada Masato "Yama" (drums)

== Discography ==
=== Indies ===
- Snowkel (シュノーケル, Shunōkeru) (December 18, 2004)
- Sora Colorful (ソラカラフル, Sora Karafuru) (June 1, 2005)

=== Singles ===
- Large Puddle (大きな水たまり, Ooki na Mizutamari) (November 2, 2005)
- Discord Satellite (波風サテライト, Namikaze Sateraito) (January 1, 2006)
- Traveller Beginner (旅人ビギナー, Tabibito Biginā) (April 5, 2006)
- solar wind (August 23, 2006)
- Bye-Bye×Hello (January 1, 2007)
- Weather Forecast (天気予報, Tenkiyohō) (April 8, 2007)
- Miracle (奇跡, Kiseki) (August 8, 2007)
- Summer wind (ナツカゼ, Natsu Kaze) (July 9, 2008)
- RESTART/FIND (May 24, 2015)
- 'It's so tight/factor' (いいじゃん/factor, Iijan/factor) (Dec 3, 2017)

=== Albums ===
- Snowkel Snorkel (April 26, 2006)
1. Discord Satellite (波風サテライト, Namikaze Sateraito)
2. Pantomime (パントマイム, Pantomaimu)
3. Traveller Beginner (旅人ビギナー, Tabibito Biginā)
4. The Grasshopper and the Hermit Crabs (アマヤドカリとキリギリス, Amayadokari to Kirigirisu)
5. 62
6. Esper (エスパー, Esupā)
7. Large Puddle (大きな水たまり, Ōki na Mizumatari)
8. 100,000 hp
9. Record (Snowkel Snorkel mix) (レコード(SNOWKEL SNORKEL mix))
10. REWIND
11. Summer's Dinosaur (夏の恐竜, Natsu no Kyōryū)
- EQ (October 3, 2007)
1. Another World
2. Weather Forecast (天気予報, Tenki Yohō)
3. solar wind
4. Incompetent People (無能の人, Munō no Hito)
5. Miracle (EQ Version) (奇跡 (EQ Version), Kiseki)
6. I Love You (アイラブユー, Ai Rabu Yū)
7. Nantara Mental (なんたらメンタル, Nantara Mentaru)
8. Surströmming (シュールストレミング, Shūrusutoremingu)
9. Snow Snare (雪の罠, Yuki no Wana)
10. Bye-Bye×Hello
11. Count to 3 (3つ数えろ, Mittsu Kazoero)
12. You and Us (ボクラとキミラ, Bokura to Kimira)
- EYE (December 16, 2015)
1. PLASMA
2. QUEST
3. REVOLVER
4. RESTART 〜ALBUM VERSION〜
5. EYE
6. REGRET
7. CINEMA
8. OPEN
9. CLOSE
10. HIGHWAY
