= Ricardo Cruz (singer) =

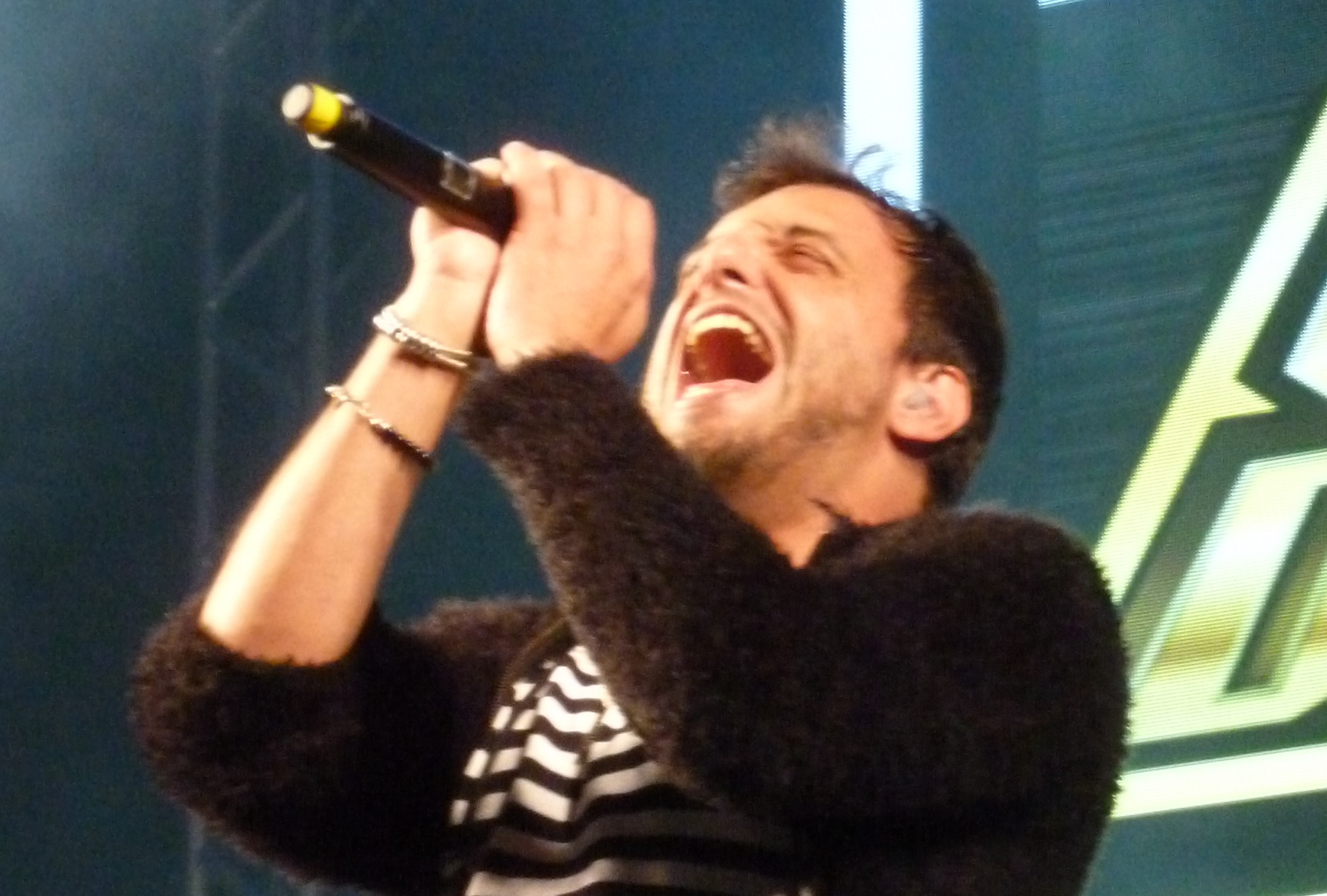
- Cruz performing at Anime Friends 2016

Background information
- Born: Ricardo Schiesari Barreto Cruz; January 12, 1982 (age 44)
- Origin: São Paulo, Brazil
- Genres: Heavy metal, rock, anison
- Occupations: Singer-songwriter, journalist
- Years active: 1999–present
- Labels: Lantis, Yamato Music

Ricardo Schiesari Barreto Cruz (born January 12, 1982) is a Brazilian singer-songwriter and journalist known for his performances of anime theme songs in Brazil as well being a semi-regular member of the Anison band JAM Project. He regularly tours with the band whenever they visit Latin America, and is also featured on several of the group's singles beginning with the B-side of 2005's "Meikyū no Prisoner".

== Early life ==
In the mid-1990s to early 2000s, Cruz worked as a musician in Brazil, his native homeland. He also worked as a journal writer, typically translating from Japanese to Portuguese and English. He speaks Portuguese and Japanese fluently, and saw Hironobu Kageyama perform several times while studying and living in Japan. In 2003, he met Kageyama at Anime Friends, the Brazilian anime convention Cruz co-founded. At the event the following year, Cruz stepped in for Masami Okui during rehearsals, since she had a cold. Kageyama expressed interest in Ricardo's voice, and encouraged him to audition to join the band. He submitted a demo track which won him a position in JAM Project as a secondary member.

== Career ==
Ricardo participated in-studio with JAM Project for the first time in 2005, starting with "Neppu Cybuster Shippu!". In 2006, he performed as part of the group with the original leader Ichirou Mizuki on another single, "Stormbringer". Shortly after in 2007, he shared the stage for the first time in the group's fourth live concert, JAM Project JAPAN CIRCUIT 2007 Break-Out.

He wrote the lyrics for the song "Sempre Sonhando ~Yume Oibito~" on JAM Project's 6th best album in 2006, Get over the Border. In 2009 he collaborated with Kouji Wada to produce a song in Japanese and Portuguese. On September 17, 2010, Ricardo joined up with JAM Project once more for their Reunion concert, where the original members sang with the current members.

Ricardo returned to work with JAM Project in Japan in late 2011 and early 2012 for their Go! Go! GOING!! world tour. He wrote the track "Cross World" on Hironobu Kageyama's 2012 album Rock Japan. In June 2014 started a YouTube channel called MugenLab where he talks about his trips to Japan and his career. On July 20, he debuted his EP called On the Rocks in 2014 at the annual anime convention Anime Friends. Also in 2014, he and other Brazilian singers created the project called " Cavaleiros in Concert" which is a concert with songs of the anime Saint Seiya performed by Ricardo, Rodrigo Rossi, Larissa Tassi and Edu Falaschi. They took this concert to several cities in Brazil.

In 2019, he composed and sang in JAM Project's opening theme for the second season of One-Punch Man. The song is titled "Seijaku no Apostle" (静寂のアポストル, lit. "The Silent Apostle") in Japanese, or "Uncrowned Greatest Hero" internationally. Cruz also appeared in the music video.

== Works ==
=== Manga translation ===
Series	Volumes translated
Bleach	1–24
Full Metal Panic!	—
Naruto	1–16
Vampire Knight	1–2
B't X	—

=== Anime theme songs (Brazilian Portuguese versions) ===
Series	Role	Song	Co-performers
Hunter × Hunter	Opening	"Bom Dia (Ohayo)"	—
Saint Seiya: The Hades Chapter – Inferno (OVA)	Opening	"Megami no Senshi ~ Pegasus Forever ~"	—
Saint Seiya Omega	Opening	"Nova Geração (Next Generation)"	Edu Falaschi, Rodrigo Rossi, Larissa Tassi
Saint Seiya: Soul of Gold	Opening	"Soldier Dream v2"	Rodrigo Rossi, Larissa Tassi
Dragon Ball Super	Ending 6	"Chaohan Music"	—
Dragon Ball Super	Ending 9	"Haruka"	—

== Discography ==
=== Solo and group releases ===
Artist	Type	Title	Year
Solo	EP	"On the Rocks"	2014
Solo	Single	"Invasion Zone"	2020
Danger3	Single	"Neo Tokyo"	2017

=== Collaborations ===
Artist	Album	Song	Note
Aquaria	Shambala	"Neo"	feat. Hironobu Kageyama
Koji Wada	Kazakami no oka kara	"Sem Barreiras ~Kegarenaki Jidai he~"	feat. Ricardo Cruz
Hironobu Kageyama	Rock Japan	"Cross World ~Oretachi no Frontier Spirit~"	Composition
Comitiva do Rock	—	"Dia de Anime!"	—
Tari Tari (soundtrack)	—	"Amigo! Amigo!"	As "Condor Queens", feat. Eduardo Costa and Rafael Ryuji; 26 September 2012

==== JAM Project ====
Type	Title	Release date	Note
Album	Olympia ~JAM Project Best Collection IV~	—	—
Album	Big Bang ~JAM Project Best Collection V~	—	—
Album	Get over the Border ~JAM Project Best Collection VI~	—	—
Album	Seventh Explosion ~JAM Project Best Collection VII~	—	—
Single	"Meikyuu no Prisoner"	22 June 2005	—
Single	"Stormbringer"	27 April 2007	—
Single	"Rescue Fire"	27 May 2009	—
Single	"Shugoshin – The Guardian"	5 August 2009	—
Single	"Bakuchin Kanryou! Rescue Fire"	11 November 2009	—
Single	"Transformers EVO"	21 April 2010	—
Single	"Waga na wa Garo"	25 January 2012	Vocals and composition
Single	"Mirai he no Chikai"	10 July 2013	—
Single	"Mirai he no Daikoukai – Great Voyage"	2 July 2014	—
Single	"Kessen – The Final Round"	22 February 2015	—
DVD concert	JAM Project Japan Circuit 2007 Break Out	—	—
DVD concert	JAM Project Japan Flight 2008 No Border	—	—
DVD concert	JAM Project Hurricane Tour 2009 ~Gate of the Future~	—	—
