= Root Five =

Japanese boy band

- Origin: Japan
- Genres: J-Pop
- Works: Root Five, Summer Days, Rooters, Re:paint
- Years active: 2011–present
- Members: Dasoku, Pokota, Mi-chan, Kettaro, Koma'n
- Website: rootfive.jp

Root Five (ルート・ファイブ - stylized in all caps or as √5) is a Japanese boy band formed by members Dasoku, Pokota, Mi-chan, Kettaro e Koma'n, five popular singers of Nico Nico Douga. They are better known for having provided theme songs for Saint Seiya Omega, Saint Seiya: Soul of Gold and Fairy Tail. They also had a small participation as voice actors in Saint Seiya Omega. The song Yakusoku no Ashita e, ending of Soul of Gold, is also on the band's second album, Rooters, released on February 25, 2015. The album also contains the Fairy Tail song Kimi no Mirai. Dasoku, as a solo act, has also contributed to Kingdom's third ending.

The band's first DVD, Root Five Tour 2013, peaked 7th at Oricon, the same reached by DVD Root Five Japan Tour 2014 Super Summer Days Story Matsuri side.

In 2014, they performed in Singapore at Anime Festival Asia.

In 2020, they performed in Malaysia at Japan Expo Malaysia.

== Discography ==
=== Singles ===
- 2013 - Junai Delusion
- 2013 - Love Treasure
- 2014 - Kimi no Kirai

=== Albums ===
- 2013 - Root Five
- 2014 - Summer Days
- 2015 - Rooters
- 2015 - The Best of ROOT FIVE
- 2019 - Re:paint

=== DVDs ===
- 2013 - ROOT FIVE Tour 2013
- 2013 - Gyutto, Root 5 - ROOT FIVE OFFSHOT side
- 2013 - ROOT FIVE Music Video Collection 2011-2013 [Season I]
- 2014 - Root Five "love Treasur" Tour 2014 - Story Live Side
- 2014 - ROOT FIVE Japan Tour 2014 Supaa Summer Days Story Matsuri side

=== Songs in anime ===
- 2013 - "Shinsei Shinwa (Next Generation)" - Saint Seiya Omega
- 2014 - "Kimi no Mirai" - Fairy Tail
- 2015 - "Soldier Dream ver. Soul of Gold" - Saint Seiya: Soul of Gold
- 2015 - "Yakusoku no Ashita e" - Saint Seiya: Soul of Gold
