= Saint Seiya: Soul of Gold =

2015 Japanese-anime television series

- Saint Seiya - Soul of Gold
- Promotional image for Saint Seiya - Soul of Gold with Leo Aiolia.

聖闘士星矢(セイントセイヤ) 黄金魂(ソウル オブ ゴールド) (Saint Seiya: Soul of Gold)
- Created by: Masami Kurumada
- Original net animation
- Directed by: Takeshi Furuta
- Written by: Toshimitsu Takeuchi
- Music by: Toshihiko Sahashi
- Studio: Bridge (Note: Animation studio); Toei Company (Note: Production company)
- Released: April 11, 2015 – September 26, 2015
- Runtime: 25 minutes (each)
- Episodes: 13

Saint Seiya: Soul of Gold (聖闘士星矢(セイントセイヤ) 黄金魂(ソウル オブ ゴールド), Seinto Seiya: Souru obu Gōrudo) is a Japanese ONA series, a spin-off from the classic anime Saint Seiya, the animated adaptation of Masami Kurumada's manga of the same name. Although Toei Company produced the series, it was not animated by Toei's own studio Toei Animation, but by Bridge.

The series was announced on October 29 at the 2014 Tamashii Nation Figure Expo in Japan, revealing it would focus on the deceased Gold Saints in the aftermath of Athena's battle against Hades in the 20th century.

It was also revealed that the series approach would be an original anime story, as it would not be an adaptation of any of the arcs contained in Kurumada's manga or other related spinoffs in the franchise.

An official event was to be held on October 31, 2014, at the Tamashii Nation 2014 Expo in Japan, to further introduce the series to the specialized media and to the public. Saint Seiya: Soul of Gold was released on April 11, 2015. Soul of Gold is part of the projects that commemorate the 40th anniversary of Kurumada as a manga artist. Soul of Gold drew a 50 million viewership worldwide by September 2015.

== Plot ==
After giving their lives in order to destroy the Wall of Grief and thus; help Seiya and his friends reach the Elysium Fields to save Athena and defeat Hades, all twelve Gold Saints reappear in Asgard, after being mysteriously revived. While looking for answers about why they were brought back to life and by whom, the Gold Saints must fight a new enemy that threatens Asgard with their new and enhanced cloths.

== Theme songs ==
Opening: Soldier Dream ver. Soul of Gold (by Root Five)

Ending: Yakusoku No Asu E (by Root Five)

== Characters ==
=== Gold Saints ===
Leo Aiolia (獅子座のアイオリア, Reo no Aioria)
Voiced by: Hideyuki Tanaka
The Leo Gold Saint who is the guardian of the Leo Temple in the Sanctuary as well as the main protagonist. Having been revived along with the other Gold Saints after their sacrifice to destroy the Wall of Grief, and with no knowledge of why, Aiolia allies himself with Lyfia after some persuasion and later engage their new enemy Andreas, the new representative of Odin in Asgard.
Aiolia wears a medallion which was given to him by Aiolos a long time ago, which is blessed by Athena, allowing him to change his Cloth into a God Cloth.
Aiolia has been branded with the mark of the Einherjar, the legion of the dead, like his fellow Gold Saints.
As the Gold Saints split up, he finds himself in Vanaheim where he and God Warrior Fródi once more clash, with both combatants at full power, before later engaging Andreas.
Sagittarius Aiolos (射手座のアイオロス, Sajitariasu no Aiorosu)
Voiced by: Yusaku Yara
Aiolia's older brother, the Sagittarius Gold Saint and guardian of the Sagittarius Temple in the Sanctuary who died while defending Athena from in the original Saint Seiya series. Having been revived along with the other Gold Saints, he encourages Aiolia to find out why they have been revived by travelling to Yggdrasil.
Aiolos also appears in a flashback during episode 6 where he confronts Andreas and is easily overpowered as his own Cosmo is drained by Yggdrasil. However, Aiolos still manages to hold his own as his bow changes to a more divine shape, allowing him to overpower Andreas before falling down the mountain, leaving his fate unknown.
Aiolos has been branded with the mark of the Einherjar, the legion of the dead, like his fellow Gold Saints.
Aries Mu (牡羊座のムウ, Ariesu no Mū)
Voiced by: Takumi Yamazaki
The Aries Gold Saint and guardian of the Aries Temple in the Sanctuary. Having been revived along with the other Gold Saints after their sacrifice to destroy the Wall of Grief, Mu arrives in an abandoned village, finding a young boy who was all alone. Meeting Lyfia, Mu is informed of a God Warrior he noticed earlier and ventures to deal with the new enemy.
Mu has been branded with the mark of the Einherjar, the legion of the dead, like his fellow Gold Saints. He is the one who discuss with Shaka and later reveals the God Cloths to his companions.
After the Gold Saints split up, Mu finds himself in Svartalfheim where he and Fafner prepare to settle the score for the last time.
Scorpio Milo (蠍座のミロ, Sukōpion no Miro)
Voiced by: Toshihiko Seki
The Scorpio Gold Saint and the guardian of the Scorpio Temple in the Sanctuary. Having been revived along with the other Gold Saints after their sacrifice to destroy the Wall of Grief, Milo makes his appearance as he tortures an Asgardian soldier for information about the God Warriors' location, also hearing rumors of a Gold Saint witnessed.
Like his fellow Gold Saints, Milo has been branded with the mark of the Einherjar, the legion of the dead.
Milo does not join his fellow Gold Saints to destroy the chambers as he sacrifices himself in order to destroy one of the three exposed points of the Great Root, with the help of the golden dagger and his God Cloth.
Taurus Aldebaran (牡牛座のアルデバラン, Taurusu no Arudebaran)
Voiced by: Tesshō Genda
The Taurus Gold Saint and the guardian of the Taurus Temple in the Sanctuary. Having been revived along with the other Gold Saints after their sacrifice to destroy the Wall of Grief, Aldebaran arrives at an arena in Asgard where he regroups with Dohko, discussing their mysterious revival after their sacrifice. Aldebaran's Cloth still retains its broken horn from his battle against Bronze Saint Pegasus Seiya from the original series.
Aldebaran has been branded with the mark of the Einherjar, the legion of the dead, like his fellow Gold Saints.
As the Gold Saints split up, Aldebaran encounters Heracles again at the chamber of Jotunheim where they face each other one last time as Aldebaran equips his God Cloth. After his victory, Aldebaran sacrifices the last bit of strength he has left to destroy the statue, being absorbed by Yggdrasil along with Heracles as Jotunheim collapses.
Aquarius Camus (水瓶座のカミュ, Akueriasu no Kamyu)
Voiced by: Nobutoshi Canna
The Aquarius Gold Saint, the guardian of the Aquarius Temple in the Sanctuary and master of Bronze Saint Cygnus Hyoga. Having been revived along with the other Gold Saints after their sacrifice to destroy the Wall of Grief, Camus ambush Milo and is revealed to be working with the God Warriors according to Surtr. Being a childhood friend of Surtr and having caused his sister's death before he became a Saint, Camus decides to use his new life to die in battle for Surtr, at the risk of betraying Athena.
He later engages Shura in equal combat at Jaheim where they both awaken a fraction of their God Cloths to clash against each other, ending in both Gold Saints being wounded. However, Camus' soul finally awakens as Surtr kills Shura with a stab to the chest. Reminding himself of the memories of fighting with friends, Camus reluctantly persuades himself to finally join the Gold Saints' cause by fighting Surtr.
As he defeats Surtr, Camus reveals his mark of the Einherjar as the chamber collapses.
Virgo Shaka (乙女座のシャカ, Barugo no Shaka)
Voiced by: Yūji Mitsuya
The Virgo Gold Saint who is considered to be the closest man to god and is the guardian of the Virgo Temple in the Sanctuary. Having been revived along with the other Gold Saints after their sacrifice to destroy the Wall of Grief, Shaka reveals himself to Milo whom he rescued after finding him in the river. He and Mu discuss the God Cloths, which Mu later reveals to his comrades.
During the end of episode 6, Shaka is briefly seen as he makes way to Yggdrasil in order to fight alongside his comrades. At the end of episode 7, he reaches Alfheim where he is greeted by Baldr and they both get into position to fight one another. After defeating the God Warrior with his God Cloth, Shaka is buried by the collapsing Alfheim along with Baldr, but he survives and joins his comrades against Andreas who is now possessed by Loki.
Capricorn Shura (山羊座のシュラ, Kapurikōn no Shura)
Voiced by: Takeshi Kusao
The Capricorn Gold Saint who is the guardian of the Capricorn Temple in the Sanctuary and the man who killed Aiolia's older brother Aiolos at the orders of the Grand Pope in the original series. Having been revived along with the other Gold Saints after their sacrifice to destroy the Wall of Grief, Shura arrives just in time to rescue Aiolia from a lethal blow from the "Shura" illusion.
He later confronts Camus at Jaheim and the two clash in equal strength. However, his true objective all along was to destroy the statue of Jaheim which he successfully achieves before he is killed by Surtr.
Cancer Deathmask (蟹座のデスマスク, Kyansā no Desumasuku)
Voiced by: Ryōichi Tanaka
The Cancer Gold Saint and guardian of the Cancer Temple in the Sanctuary. Having been revived along with the other Gold Saints after their sacrifice to destroy the Wall of Grief, Deathmask appears at a market in Asgard where he often goes to a flower shop, having fallen in love with the girl Helena.
During episode 4, Deathmask equips his Cloth again after being recognized as the true Cancer Gold Saint. To Deathmask's horror, Helena succumbs to her wounds sustained earlier and he cries while cradling her.
During episode 6, Deathmask makes way to Yggdrasil to join his comrades, taking one last look at Helena's flower shop first. He later arrives at Svartalfheim and engages Fafner while sending Mu ahead. After awakening his God Cloth and defeating Fafner, Deathmask collapses from exhaustion as the statue of wisdom shatters.
Pisces Aphrodite (魚座のアフロディーテ, Pisukesu no Afurodīte)
Voiced by: Keiichi Nanba
The Pisces Gold Saint and guardian of the Pisces Temple in the Sanctuary. Having been revived along with the other Gold Saints after their sacrifice to destroy the Wall of Grief, Aphrodite arrives at the flower market where he meets with Deathmask, who has also been revived in Asgard.
He confronts God Warrior Fafner at a hospital, revealing what he knows about Yggdrasil. Barely escaping with Helena, Aphrodite is impaled and absorbed by the roots of Yggdrasil.
During episode 12, the Gold Saints are shown to be safe. It is then revealed that Aphrodite was the one saving them, thanks to his immunity to plant poisons.
Libra Dohko (天秤座の童虎, Raibura no Dōko)
Voiced by: Kenyu Horiuchi
The Libra Gold Saint, guardian of the Libra Temple in the Sanctuary and master of Bronze Saint Dragon Shiryu. One of the only survivors from the previous Holy War against Hades, Dohko is the oldest and considered the wisest among the Gold Saints. Having been revived along with the other Gold Saints after their sacrifice in order to destroy the Wall of Grief, Dohko rendezvous with Aldebaran and they discuss their revival as they share a drink.
When the Gold Saints split up, Dohko enters the chamber of death Helheim, where he is confronted by a hypnotized Lyfia and God Warrior Utgardar. Easily overwhelming the God Warrior, Dohko is shocked as the statue of death shatters after receiving such a small impact, making him wonder if it was intentional. He, along with Saga and Mu saves Aiolia and confronts Andreas together, eventually facing defeat by Loki who possess Andreas.
Gemini Saga (双子座のサガ, Jemini no Saga)
Voiced by: Ryōtarō Okiayu
The Gemini Gold Saint and guardian of the Gemini Temple in the Sanctuary. Saga ruled as the Grand Pope during the original series. Having been revived along with the other Gold Saints after their sacrifice to destroy the Wall of Grief, Saga arrives just in time to rescue Milo from the vicious onslaught from Surtr, Camus and Sigmund.
Revealing what he knows to Milo, he states he will not stand in his way as Milo desperately attempts to move towards Yggdrasil in order to destroy it.
He later arrives at the chamber of mist, Niflheim, where Sigmund is waiting to settle the score. Saga easily dodge his attacks but is later forced to awaken his God Cloth as Sigmund is manipulated into a berserk state. However, Saga allows Sigmund to live after shattering the statue of mist.
He is defeated along with Mu and Dohko by Loki who possess Andreas' body, despite using Athena Exclamation with their God Cloths.

=== New God Warriors ===
Gullinbursti Fródi (グリンブルスティのフロディ, Gurinburusuti no Furodi)
Voiced by: Hiroshi Okamoto
One of the seven new God Warriors introduced in the series, and the first God Warrior to make an appearance. Fródi is considered the proudest about being a God Warrior as his family has served Odin for a long time.
He is shocked as the Asgardian soldiers reveal a Gold Saint who took them down, hoping to engage this powerful foe later. As Aiolia equips his Leo Gold Cloth, Fródi charge at the Gold Saint and the two are seemingly equal until Aiolia's Cloth change shape and Fródi suffers defeat before being forced to retreat. Fródi carries a sword named Sieg Schwert, able to retract from the hilt to slash his foes at will.
He confronts Aiolia once more in the chamber of Vanaheim with his new Odin Sapphire, and the two seem to be equal in strength as Aiolia's full strength has returned. During their fight, they notice that some of the statues have been shattered. He shatters the Odin Sapphire as Andreas attempts to control him through it when Lyfia arrives in Vanaheim, before Utgardar arrives and kills her. Sending Aiolia ahead, Fródi prepares to fight Lyfia's murderer, eventually defeating him as the final chamber collapses.
Nidhogg Fafner (ニーズヘッグのファフナー, Nīzuheggu no Fafunā)
Voiced by: Kentarou Itou
One of the seven new God Warriors introduced in the series, and the second God Warrior to reveal himself. Considered the most vicious and cruel God Warrior, Fafner is willingly using anything or anyone to use in his experimentations, even humans. He is engaged by Mu before taking him for experimentation. However, it was already planned by Mu to gain knowledge about Yggdrasil which angers Fafner, forcing him to flee as Aiolia arrives.
He makes another appearance as he creates something special for Andreas (later revealed to be the new Odin Sapphires) as Aphrodite arrives and challenge the God Warrior, easily overpowering him with his roses. Being forced to reveal how to break Yggdrasil's barrier, he is directly connected to Aphrodite's mind by using a rose, allowing the Gold Saint to find out how to break the barrier. But Andreas arrives and handles Aphrodite in Fafner's place. Fafner's weapon is the sword Ridill, and it seems to have a resemblance similar to a dragon's tail.
Fafner confronts Mu with his new Odin Sapphire in Svartalfheim before being comically beaten twice by Mu's psychokinesis who has no time for chatting. But he reveals a stronger Cosmo and lash out at Mu, bragging about his powers. He later face the challenge and defeat at the hands of Deathmask's God Cloth, left to suffer for all eternity in Yomotsu Hirasaka.
Tanngrisnir Heracles (タングリスニルのヘラクルス, Tangurisuniru no Herakurusu)
Voiced by: Yuji Ueda
One of the seven new God Warriors introduced in the series, and the third God Warrior to make an appearance. Heracles is considered the most powerful God Warrior and is also the largest among the seven God Warriors.
He challenge the powers of Gold Saint Libra Dohko, who accepts the challenge before sending Taurus Aldebaran instead. As Aldebaran remembers that he leaves the thinking part to others, his broken horn suddenly regrows and allows him to overpower Heracles, who is shocked at what just happened before he retreats. Heracles carries a large hammer named Mjollnir and a shield on each of his shoulders.
Once more the two juggernauts fight as Aldebaran reach Jotunheim which is protected by Heracles. However, Heracles is scolded for letting the Odin Sapphire's power consume him and he is easily defeated by Aldebaran's God Cloth, shattering his God Robe. As the roots of Yggdrasil consume him, he manages to restrain Aldebaran who destroys the statue before they both are absorbed by Yggdrasil.
Eikthyrnir Surtr (エイクシュニルのスルト, Eikushuniru no Suruto)
Voiced by: Isshin Chiba
One of the seven new God Warriors introduced in the series, and the fourth God Warrior to make an appearance. He is considered a tactician who prioritizes efficiency in battle.
He reveals himself as he and his childhood friend and current Gold Saint Camus ambush Gold Saint Milo, easily defeating him and causing him great wounds.
Surtr once lost his sister due to an avalanche Camus caused when he was younger, explaining Camus' devotion to fighting for Surtr and the God Warriors against the Gold Saints.
Surtr's weapon is the sword of flames known as Lævateinn.
After Shura's destruction of the statue in Jaheim, Surtr appears with his new Odin Sapphire and reveals the Muspelheim statue of fire before he kills the wounded Shura.
This causes Camus and Surtr to finally engage one another in combat as Camus' soul awakens at last and he easily overpowers the Gold Saint before revealing a more sinister personality, as well as the power of his sword and the cold blue flame surrounding it. However, Surtr and the statue meet their demise at the hands of Camus' God Cloth and his scorching ice.
Grani Sigmund (グラニルのシグムンド, Guraniru no Shigumundo)
Voiced by: Tōru Nara
One of the seven new God Warriors introduced in the series, and the fifth God Warrior to reveal himself. Sigmund is a brute warrior who dislikes cheap tricks in battle.
He is also the older brother of God Warrior Alpha Dubhe Siegfried, one of the God Warriors who fell in battle during the skirmish between Hilda and Athena. He distrusts Camus' loyalty to the God Warriors, not caring whether he is a friend of Surtr or not.
Sigmund carries a large greatsword called Gram.
Sigmund is the guardian of the chamber Niflheim, where he and Saga settle their score. Despite suffering the full effect of the Galaxian Explosion from Saga's God Cloth, Sigmund is revealed to be still alive and sheds a tear as he watches Siegfried in the sky, smiling at him. Sigmund is also, in fact, the second who saw Hilda's changed personality before being brought to prison by Thor and Syd (the Phecda and Mizar God Warriors from the original series respectively), the first being Alberich (The Megrez God Warrior from the original series)
Hræsvelgr Baldr (フレースヴェルグのバルドル, Furēsuverugu no Barudoru)
Voiced by: Yuuki Tai
One of the seven new God Warriors introduced in the series, and the sixth God Warrior to reveal himself. He is briefly mentioned by Lyfia who reveals to Aiolia what she knows about them. According to Lyfia, Baldr is considered immortal but no one knows exactly why. In episode 4 Andreas asks Baldr for his opinion on the Gold Saints, and he states that only Aiolia and Aldebaran have revealed the changes in their Cloths, implying that not all twelve Gold Saints may use that ability.
Baldr wears a sword with a golden blade named Tyrfing.
He greets Virgo Shaka who arrives in the chamber of light, Alfheim with his new Odin Sapphire. As they both prepare to battle each other, Andreas mention that this will be an interesting match as the man closest to the gods is going to fight against a god, revealing that Baldr is not a mortal. Baldr suffers defeat, however, at the hands of Shaka and his God Cloth. Losing his godly powers, Shaka neutralize the unbearable pain his body suffers, allowing him to die in peace.
Garmr Utgardar (ガルムのウートガルザ, Garumu no Ūtogaruza)
Voiced by: Kenji Nojima
One of the seven new God Warriors introduced in the series, and the seventh and final God Warrior to make an appearance. According to Lyfia, Útgarðar is a mysterious person, as no one has ever seen his face due to the mask he's wearing. He appears as Andreas is told about the Gold Saints and the powers they have shown so far, but he says nothing.
He confronts Dohko at the chamber of death, Helheim with his new Odin Sapphire, where he finally speaks and reveals his rank, name and sword Dainsleif. Engaging Dohko, he is easily overwhelmed and seems to aid the destruction of the statue of death, losing his mask for a moment at the same time. While not wearing his mask, a mark similar to the Einherjar is revealed. He meets his demise during his final clash against Frodhi.

=== Asgardians ===
Andreas Lise (アンドレアス・リセ, Andoreasu Rise)
Voiced by: Tomokazu Seki
The new representative of Odin in Asgard, and the central antagonist of the series. Appearing as a nice and gentle man to the villagers, he truly wish to dominate Asgard with the God Warriors, having regrown the forbidden tree Yggdrasil which drains the Cosmo of everyone and increases the God Warriors powers and, most likely, his own powers as he is able to reflect an attack from Gold Saint Cancer Deathmask in the fourth episode. He also seem to have control over Yggdrasil, as he uses its roots to impale Pisces Aphrodite as he tries to escape with Helena, one of the villagers. He then confronts Deathmask whom easily defeats before witnessing the "something else" in Deathmask's Cloth.
During episode 6, a flashback reveals his confrontation with Gold Saint Aiolos which resulted in several scars on his left eye. During his battle against Aiolia and later Dohko, Saga and Mu, Andreas reveals his scheme to use the Gold Cloths in order to feed Yggdrasil energy. Easily defeating Aiolia despite his God Cloth, Andreas is seemingly killed by Dohko, Saga and Mu' Athena Exclamation empowered by their God Cloths.
Loki (ロキ, Roki)
Voiced by: Tomokazu Seki
The false god of Asgard and the true antagonist of the series. He awakens when he possesses Andreas' left hand and draws out the arrow Aiolos successfully shot at his left eye. He then proceeds to quickly take down Saga, Mu and Dohko with his massive speed and power. When Shaka appears and awakens his God Cloth, Loki easily neutralize the Gold Saint's attack and defeats him as well. He seems to be defeated unable to completely revive as Andreas is seemingly killed by Dohko, Saga and Mu's Athena Exclamation powered by their God Cloths.
Lyfia (リフィア, Rifia)
Voiced by: Aya Hisakawa
Hilda's maid after having once being rescued by her when she was young. For some unknown reason, Lyfia has been chosen by Hilda to rescue Asgard as no one else can, and she attempts to gather followers who can aid her in rescuing Asgard. She later encounters the Gold Saint Leo Aiolia who has somehow revived in Asgard as he died at the Wall of Grief.
While they travel, she meets several of Aiolia's comrades, including Gold Saints Aries Mu and Cancer Deathmask, although she is disgusted at Deathmask's refusal to fight, and rather drink instead. As she travels with Aiolia, she learn more about the Gold Saints and their story. She is killed by Útgarðar shortly after revealing the truth about the Gold Saints' revival to Asgard, devastating Aiolia.
Hilda (ヒルダ, Hiruda)
Voiced by: Mitsuko Horie
The representative of Odin who was once possessed by the Nibelungen Ring and later rescued by the Bronze Saint protagonists from the original series. Having fallen under some strange illness, Hilda prays for Lyfia to save Asgard by defeating Andreas and stopping his evil schemes.
Freyja (フレア, Furea)
Hilda's sister.
Helena (ヘ レ ナ., Herena)
A civilian who sells flowers in one of the villages of Asgard. She is in the care of four young siblings who cares as their mother. DeathMask has deeply fallen for her.

== Episodes ==
No.	Title	Original release date
1	"Gold Legend, Revive!"; Transliteration: "Yomigaere! Ōgon Densetsu" (Japanese: 蘇れ！黄金伝説)	April 11, 2015
Shortly after the destruction of the Wall of Grief, Aiolia is suddenly revived in a snowy land, remembering everything that happened as the Gold Saints sacrificed themselves. Recovering in a prison, he meets Lyfia who informs him that he is in Asgard. A maid serving Hilda, Lyfia is rebelling against the rule of Andreas Lise who has become the new representative after Hilda who has fallen under an illness. Lyfia informs him that Andreas is manipulating the people of Asgard and that Hilda entrusted her to stop Andreas. At first refusing to aid Lyfia due to his own battle against Hades along his companions, Aiolia returns to aid Lyfia as the Asgardian soldiers ambush her. Donning his Leo Cloth, Aiolia duels the God Warrior Gullinbursti Frodhi armed with the Sieg Schwert which easily deflects Aiolia's attack. Standing up, he notices a strange mark on his body, which Frodhi points out that it is a mark belonging to deceased warriors known as Einherjar according to Asgardian legends. Aiolia is unable to rival him due to Yggdrasil increasing the God Warrior's power. Seeming defeated, Aiolia hears Aiolos' voice which encourage him to find out why the Gold Saints have revived and in Asgard. Burning his Cosmo to the maximum, Aiolia's Cloth changes form and becomes far more powerful. Once more clashing with Frodhi, Aiolia is able to repel the God Warrior's sword before falling unconscious as his Cloth returns to normal. As Frodhi is being carried by some Asgardian soldiers, he notices a slight change in Lyfia's appearance and attitude as she cradles Aiolia. Meanwhile, Mu appears in another part of Asgard and hides from another God Warrior with an evil grin.
2	"The Secret of Yggdrasil Revealed!"; Transliteration: "Abake! Yugudorashiru no Himitsu" (Japanese: 暴け！ユグドラシルの秘密)	April 25, 2015
Leaving Aiolia to rest after his battle, Lyfia ventures out to find water or food, eventually falling unconscious in the snow. As she recovers in an empty village, she meets a young boy who gives her something to drink. Shortly after, Mu arrives and informs her that he arrived a few days ago in the village which seemed like everyone had disappeared. Discussing a God Warrior with a dragon-shaped God Robe known as Nidhogg Fafner, Mu asks Lyfia to remain in the village and recover while he dealt with Fafner. Mu ambushes the God Warrior and is easily defeated by his whip before being taken for experimenting by Fafner who binds him to the roots of Yggdrasil. Realizing that Yggdrasil is the source of evil, Mu easily breaks free from the roots and retaliates against Fafner before regrouping with Aiolia and Lyfia, with Fafner escaping. Meanwhile, at an arena, Aldebaran witnesses Dohko fighting several Asgardian soldiers for sport. As they rendezvous at a bar, the Gold Saints discuss their revival in Asgard and that someone is playing with their lives. Before they have time for further talk, the God Warrior Tanngrisnir Heracles confronts them and challenge them. Leaving him to Aldebaran due to his previous loss during the last battle between Athena's Saints and Asgard, Dohko watches from the tribune as Aldebaran dons his Taurus Cloth. As Heracles attacks Aldebaran, the Gold Saint does not make a move which infuriates the God Warrior. Launching an attack at the civilians instead, Aldebaran moves in the way and deflects the attack. Remembering that he would usually leave the thinking part to his other comrades, Aldebaran burns his Cosmo and regrows his broken horn much to Dohko's surprise, overpowering Heracles for a brief moment before he retreats. During their battles, both Mu and Aldebaran are affected by the same Einherjar mark as Aiolia previously gained during his battle against Frodhi. Finally, they all decide to journey to Yggdrasil and destroy it. In another part of Asgard, Milo tortures an Asgardian soldier for information about the God Warriors. He is surprised as the soldier mentions the sight of a Gold Saint.
3	"Gold vs. Gold: Clash of the Saints!"; Transliteration: "Gekitotsu! Gorudo Seinto tai Gorudo Seinto" (Japanese: 激突！黄金聖闘士VS黄金聖闘士)	May 9, 2015
Aiolia and Lyfia head towards the village of Asgard while splitting up with Mu. Arriving in the village, they encounter Deathmask who previously encountered Aphrodite and later hanging out at a bar. Pleading with the Cancer Gold Saint, Lyfia is simply rejected as Deathmask is satisfied with his new life, accepting it as a bonus for their sacrifice in the Underworld, leaving the rest for Athena, Seiya and the Bronze Saints they sacrificed their lives for. Seemingly challenging Deathmask, Aiolia simply leaves with Lyfia, deciding to find a place to rest for the upcoming night. Meanwhile, Milo travels further through the lands of Asgard, meeting Camus who suddenly attacks him. Shortly after, Milo is confronted by the God Warrior Eikthyrnir Surtr. Facing an attack from the God Warrior as well as Camus, Milo is sent falling down the river where he eventually meets with Shaka inside a cave. Refusing to quietly sit by and observe what happens, Milo ventures to find the God Warriors' hidden base, confronting Camus once again. Facing his former friend in a vicious battle, they are seemingly equal in powers until God Warrior Grani Sigmund arrives to finish off Milo. However, Surtr intervenes and blasts the Gold Saint with his flames. At that moment, a mysterious figure emerge from the flames surrounding Milo: the Gemini Gold Saint, Saga!
4	"The 7 God Warriors Assembled!"; Transliteration: "Shūketsu! Shichinin no Goddo Wōriā" (Japanese: 集結！七人の神闘士)	May 23, 2015
Saga arrives to assist Milo against Camus, Surtr and Sigmund who are all astonished at seeing the strongest Gold Saint. Pulverizing the base with his Galaxian Explosion, the two God Warriors and Camus are unharmed due to Yggdrasil protecting them. As they gather their techniques, Saga transports himself and Milo away with the Another Dimension. They later discuss Yggdrasil, before Milo presses onward determined to destroy Yggdrasil. At the same time, Aiolia and Lyfia discuss the God Warriors and Andreas as they are unable to sleep. Lyfia reveals each of the God Warriors and who they are. Meanwhile, Deathmask starts noticing lesser villagers around at the bar or in the village, wondering what's going on. As he later stares at his Cloth, Aphrodite arrives informing him that Aiolia left early. Travelling to the market, Deathmask is shocked to see Helena's flower shop not having opened yet, asking the old man what's happened. Rushing to her house to search for her, he instead meets her brothers and sisters who tell the Gold Saint she has been taken to a hospital for treatment. As he remembers something the owner of the bar told him earlier, Deathmask rushes to this hospital. At the hospital, God Warrior Fafner, who has been doing research to create something special for Andreas, is confronted by Aphrodite who is successful in extracting information on how to break the barrier of Yggdrasil before being confronted by Andreas himself. Rushing out with Helena, Aphrodite urges Deathmask to run away as he arrives and grabs Helena, shortly before the Pisces Saint is impaled by the roots of Yggdrasil. Deathmask, furious at Andreas for his actions, swears to kill him even without his Cloth. Just then, his Cancer Gold Cloth once more wraps itself around Deathmask who engages the representative in unequal combat. Lamenting that he wished to help Helena but was unable to do anything, he burns his Cosmo to the maximum. He briefly overpowers Andreas as his Cloth changes form, causing Andreas to retreat for the time. As Deathmask cradles Helena, he laments as she dies. Finally, Mu reaches the man he had mentioned to Aiolia earlier, revealing it to be Shaka as he asks the Gold Saint about the hidden power in their Cloths: the God Cloth.
5	"God's Cloth Ultimate Power!"; Transliteration: "Kyūkyoku! Goddo Kurosu no Chikara" (Japanese: 究極！神聖衣の力)	June 6, 2015
Mu and Shaka converse about the God Cloths, the hidden power that resides in their Cloths. Receiving the golden dagger Athena once claimed her life with, Mu ventures to aid the other Gold Saints who travel to find the Great Roots of Yggdrasil in order to destroy them. Aiolia and Lyfia find themselves confronted by a cloaked figure revealing himself as Pegasus Seiya. As he questions Seiya why the Bronze Saints are not in Elysium, he starts to believe that they have fallen as well and that Athena has already fallen. Lyfia informs him of the Fimbulwinter, a labyrinth which uses the darkest memories of the Gold Saints to use against them. Aiolia then swears to make Andreas pay for using Seiya and his friends against them. Reluctantly preparing to strike, the "Seiya" illusion suddenly changes to "Shura" instead. At the same time, Milo interrupts Mu as he finds himself confronted by a cloaked figure. Engaging his opponent, his 15 star points is frozen and he turns to witness that it is Cygnus Hyoga. Shocked at why he's in Asgard, he later realizes that it is an illusion feeding on his darkness. Engaging the "Hyoga" illusion, Milo successfully defeats the illusion before reaching the Great Root. Meanwhile, Aldebaran and Dohko also find themselves confronted by cloaked figures revealed to be Andromeda Shun and Dragon Shiryu. Asking them why they are not in the underworld fighting Hades, the two Gold Saints manage to see through the illusions and extinguish them before reaching another Great Root. Caught off guard and trying to persuade himself that Shura only did his duty as a Saint 12 years ago when he killed Aiolos, Aiolia is unable to fight back and almost faces defeat, but the real Shura intervenes and saves Aiolia from a lethal blow before engaging the "Shura" illusion. However, he is unsuccessful in defeating the illusion as Aiolia is the one who created it. Using his Jumping Stone, Shura restrains the illusion and urges Aiolia to strike them both. Revealing his side of the story from what happened 12 years ago, he realized that one day he would have to redeem himself for killing the older brother of Aiolia who was still young then. Once again, Aiolia reluctantly burns his Cosmo before striking them both, successfully destroying the illusion and leaving Shura lightly injured. As the fog lifts, they find the third Great Root. However, in order to achieve the God Cloth, the Gold Saints must increase their Cosmo to their maximum as well as have a Cloth blessed by Athena. Aldebaran's Cloth has received Athena's tears, and Aiolia has the keepsake gemstone which belonged to Aiolos and has the blessings of Athena. However, Milo possesses neither a Cloth or artifact blessed by Athena, and is thus unable to get a God Cloth. Reluctantly, Mu teleports the dagger to Milo who, along with Aiolia and Aldebaran, awaken their God Cloths. Although they successfully destroy the Great Roots, Milo dies and is buried by the roots of Yggdrasil. The other Gold Saints feel his Cosmo disappearing and Mu arrives to see his friend buried, lamenting at the loss of his friend. Trying to reach Athena in hope of seeking answers to their revival, Shaka suddenly feels something and he opens his eyes as the Virgo Cloth wraps itself around him.
6	"Enter the 7 Chambers of Yggdrasil"; Transliteration: "Totsunyū! Yugudorashiru no Nanatsu no Ma" (Japanese: 突入！ユグドラシルの7つの間)	June 20, 2015
Aiolia, Aldebaran and Milo have successfully destroyed the Great Root barrier surrounding Yggdrasil and no longer have their Cosmo drained, although at the cost of Milo's life. Entering Yggdrasil while Andreas orders the soldiers to stand aside, The Gold Saints reunite at the center of Yggdrasil, where Lyfia remembers something she once read. Realizing that unless the statues in the 7 chambers of Yggdrasil are destroyed, they are unable to destroy the tree. Before the God Warriors leave to battle the Gold Saints, Andreas bestows upon them new Odin Sapphires with a significantly greater power which should leave the Gold Saints' God Cloths useless. According to him, the Gold Saints have been revived by Hades who's fighting Athena, naming the battle Ragnarok. As they leave, Frodhi asks Andreas about one Gold Saint who has yet to reveal himself. This leads to a flashback showing that Sagittarius Aiolos once confronted Andreas shortly after his revival in Asgard. Splitting up, each of the Gold Saints head for a chamber; Aiolia is challenged by Frodhi at Vanaheim, Aldebaran meets Heracles again at Jotunheim, Mu confronts Fafner at Svartalfheim, Shura challenge Camus at Jaheim and Dohko finds himself confronted by dozens of dead warriors in Helheim, with Shaka, Saga and Deathmask making their way to Yggdrasil as well. In another one of Andreas' flashbacks, Aiolos is caught off guard as the roots of Yggdrasil stops his movements, allowing Andreas to launch devastating blows that damage Aiolos' Cloth greatly. Still standing up against him, Aiolos burns his Cosmo and his bow changes form. Clashing with their attacks, Aiolos successfully breaks through Andreas' defenses and wounds him. Andreas then reveals scars on his left eye as the Gold Saints prepare to fight Camus and the God Warriors guarding the chambers.
7	"Showdown! God Cloth VS God Cloth"; Transliteration: "Gekishin! Goddo Kurosu tai Goddo Kurosu" (Japanese: 激震！ 神聖衣vs神聖衣)	July 4, 2015
Aiolia and Frodhi are seemingly equal as they clash in Vanaheim until Aiolia unleash his full power, taking the God Warrior by surprise. This, however, causes Frodhi to burn his Cosmo more intense as his eyes start to glow purple. In Jotunheim, Heracles taunts Aldebaran in order to make him use the God Cloth against him again, but Aldebaran refuses as he does not need the God Cloth against an opponent he has already beaten once before, not retaliating at all. He later decides to retaliate as he notice how Heracles has allowed the new Odin Sapphire to consume his soul, shattering his God Robe by using his God Cloth. However, they both die as the roots of Yggdrasil buries them, but not before Aldebaran successfully destroys the statue of Jotunheim. In Svartalfheim, Mu knocks Fafner to the ground and swears to deal with him once he has destroyed the statue, but the God Warrior stands up with a much more powerful Cosmo and lashes out at the Gold Saint. In Jaheim, Shura and Camus' attacks clash at an equal level of strength. Remembering the time where they and Saga served Hades to save Athena, they accept that they have chosen separate paths and burn their Cosmo, both awakening a portion of their God Cloths. Clashing once more, they are both wounded but the statue in Jaheim successfully breaks. At Helheim, Dohko easily wipes out the dead soldiers before attempting to attack the cloaked figure, only for his attack to be neutralized. Just then, Utgardar introduces himself to Dohko and prepares to face him while the cloaked figure is revealed to be Lyfia who seems to be in some sort of trance. Back at Jaheim, Surtr appears and kills Shura while the hidden statue of Muspelheim emerges from the ground. Camus, having finally awoken his soul again, betrays Surtr by reminding his former friend of the accident when they were young. Enraged, Surtr charge and easily overpowers Camus with his Sword of Flame now burning with a cold blue flame. As he prepares to deal the final blow, Camus reluctantely raises his arms and performs the Aurora Execution as his own Cloth evolve into a God Cloth, granting him victory as Surtr's God Robe is shattered. As they die, Surtr laments at his actions, to which Camus replies that he may finally rest now. Finally, Shaka arrives at the chamber of light, Alfheim. There he is greeted by Baldr wearing his new Odin Sapphire. Andreas states he is looking forward to this match as the man closest to the gods is about to go up against a god.
8	"Baldr, the Man Chosen by God!"; Transliteration: "Barudoru! Kami ni Erabareshi Otoko" (Japanese: バルドル！神に選ばれし男)	July 18, 2015
Shaka and Baldr engage in a violent battle in the chamber of light, Alfheim. Attempting to end the God Warrior's life by sending him to one of the 6 realms, he is shocked as Baldr reveals his godly power bestowed to him by the mighty Lord Odin. Easily evading Shaka's technique, Baldr gains the upper hand as a man considered closest to the gods have no chance against him. He proceeds to reveal his background story where he struggled to take care of everyone in a village where everyone had fallen ill. However, in spite of his struggling and due to being young and feeble, everyone died. After conversing with Odin, Baldr was given the power to be untouched by anyone, but at the same time losing something important to him, which cost him the life of his dog and caused him to kill a large number of Asgardian soldiers in the arena. However, Shaka scolds the God Warrior and states he is not a god, as he does not show any mercy. In Svartalfheim, Mu is struggling to rival Fafner's new and savage power due to his new Odin Sapphire. However, before they can continue their battle, Deathmask arrives and sends himself and the God Warrior to the Yomotsu Hirasaka, sending Mu ahead while he settles the score. Engaging Fafner, Deathmask is easily overpowered as Fafner's Odin Sapphire grants him greater powers by absorbing the power of the dead. As he demands to be returned to the living world, Deathmask is urged by Helena's brothers and sisters and he burns his Cosmo to a new level. At Helheim, Dohko easily disposes of the dead soldiers sent at him, only to be blocked by Utgardar as he questions Lyfia. Opening his eyes, Shaka's Cloth evolves into a God Cloth and he manages to defeat Baldr who realizes that the one thing he lost when he attained godhood was mercy. He states that gods must always care about the suffering of other people, and as Baldr's godhood disappears, his body suffers all the pain and suffering he has gone through without caring. However, Shaka disables his sense of pain, allowing Baldr to die in peace. Back in Yomotsu Hirasaka, Deathmask awakens his God Cloth and easily overpowers Fafner, shattering his God Robe with his newly developed technique "Sekishiki Meikyu Ha", which grounds Fafner to the ground to be stomped upon by the dead, stating that he is not worthy of neither life or death. Dooming the God Warrior to eternal suffering, Deathmask returns to the world of the living, but collapses to exhaustion. As Andreas is frustrated at Baldr's failure as two more statues have been destroyed, Saga arrives at the chamber of mist, Niflheim. There he is confronted by its guardian, Sigmund.
9	"Saga, the Unbreakable Bond of Brothers!"; Transliteration: "Saga! Atsuki Kyōdai no Kizuna" (Japanese: サガ！熱き兄弟の絆)	August 1, 2015
Saga and Sigmund fight a vicious battle at the chamber of mist, Niflheim. Revealing how he was the first to witness Hilda's change and unable to save her, his little brother became a God Warrior instead. Hearing from Andreas, a doctor at that time, the God Warriors were battling Athena's Saints and Siegfried died during that battle. Saga responds by saying he once had a brother too and know how it must feel losing a little brother. Attacking the God Warrior with his unimaginable strength, Saga inflicts severe damage on the God Robe before a part of Siegfried's God Robe covers him, surprising them both. Meanwhile, Dohko and Utgardar clash in Helheim and Dohko easily overpowers the God Warrior. However, as he hits the statue of death, his mask loosens and he reveals a similar mark of death like the Gold Saints, although slightly different. As Dohko questions that mark, the statue break despite the low impact from Utgardar; Dohko quickly asks if Utgardar intended for him to destroy it before the chamber collapses. In Vanaheim, Aiolia and Frodhi's powers constantly clash at equal level, and Frodhi removes his cape and sword before attacking with his lightspeed fists. However, Aiolia easily counters his blows as his own fists are the fangs of the golden lion. Lyfia suddenly enters Vanaheim as well, informing Aiolia of something she realized earlier: The one who truly revived the Gold Saints and brought them back to life is in fact her! Sigmund is surprised and believes Siegfried has decided to lend his power to his older brother, to which Saga replies that the God Robe is crying, shocking Sigmund. Realizing that Siegfried forgives him for the past, Sigmund is ready to stop the battle. However, Andreas manipulates Sigmund's Odin Sapphire and causes him to go completely berserk against Saga, overwhelming the Gold Saint slightly. Urged by Sigmund to not let him suffer any more humiliation, Saga burns his Cosmo to the maximum limit and awakens his own God Cloth, before dealing a lethal blow against Sigmund. After their battle, Sigmund is still alive. Saga leaves towards his next battle. Back in Vanaheim, Frodhi is ordered by Andreas to kill Lyfia, as it is forbidden to revive the dead. Despite his orders, Frodhi cannot bring himself to kill his childhood friend, no matter what. Andreas attempts to manipulate Frodhi the same way he did with Sigmund, but the God Warrior instead uses his sword to shatter his Odin Sapphire. As he states he will not kill Lyfia, Utgardar appears and slashes her chest. As she lies in Aiolia's arms, she begs for forgiveness, leaving a devastated Aiolia behind as she dies. Refusing to forgive Lyfia's murderer, Frodhi sends Aiolia ahead while he settles the score with Utgardar, allowing the Gold Saint to head straight for Andreas.
10	"Clash: Aiolia vs. Andreas!"; Transliteration: "Kessen! Aioria tai Andoreasu" (Japanese: 決戦！アイオリアVSアンドレアス)	August 15, 2015
While Aiolia reaches Andreas' chambers and confronts him with his God Cloth, Frodhi and Utgardar continue to battle each other. Utgardar states that Frodhi has not enough resolve to protect Asgard as him, until Frodhi is sent flying outside a window and hearing the voice of the real Asgard which is suffering under Andreas' rule. Frodhi regains his strength and rejoins the fight, defeating Utgardar while destroying the final statue, and learning, much to his surprise, that his opponent bears the same Einherjar mark as the Gold Saints. Meanwhile, despite using all his strength, Aiolia fails to defeat Andreas, but rejoices upon knowing that all the statues were destroyed. However, Andreas shows him the Cloths of the fallen Gold Saints, including Aiolos', revealing that the Sagittarius' Cloth was the first one he obtained. He also reveals that his true objective is to nurture the fruit of Yggdrasil using the Gold Cloths' power, and because of that he manipulated Lyfia into reviving the Gold Saints. Before he could attack the exhausted Leo Saint, Dohko, Mu and Saga appear to fight Andreas as well. The three Gold Saints hold back Andreas, taking advantage of a wound he suffered during his fight with Aiolos, but their enemy is then possessed by a god who easily overpowers them, until Shaka appears to join the fight as well. Revealing that the one behind Andreas' actions is no other than the Evil God Loki, Shaka uses his most powerful attack against him. Loki easily breaks through Shaka's offensive and restrains him as well, just to later realize that the Virgo Saint was just buying time for Dohko, Saga and Mu to evolve their Cloths into God Cloths and combine their Cosmo to strike the enemy with Athena's Exclamation, which destroys Yggdrasil completely, killing Andreas as well. When Aiolia awakens, he discovers that the fruit of Yggdrasil is still intact, as its roots claim his and his fellow saints' bodies.
11	"Resurrection! Loki, the Evil God of Asgard"; Transliteration: "Fukkatsu! Asugarudo no Jashin Roki" (Japanese: 復活！アスガルドの邪神ロキ)	August 29, 2015
Guided back to the surface by Lyfia's spirit, Aiolia watches the fruit of Yggdrasill draining the cosmo of the twelve Golden Cloths when a fully resurrected Loki appears before him, incarnated in a spare body he had preparated previously. Despite not having his Cloth, Aiolia attacks Loki, who defends himself effortlessly, until his brother Aiolos appears to assist him. In the occasion, Aiolos reveals that after his clash with Andreas, he was rescued and brought to Hilda, who informed him of Loki's advent and his ultimate objective, which is to obtain Asgard's ultimate weapon, the Spear of Gungnir, from the fruit of Yggdrasil once it is fully ripen. Loki then summons an army of Einherjar to fight by his side which are easily defeated by the brothers, but Hilda's room is also stormed by some Einherjar when Sigmund appear to protect her as well. Meanwhile, Frodhi arrives at the Shrine of Odin carrying Odin's Robe when Lyfia appears before him as well. While Aiolia and Aiolos make a retreat, Aiolos realizes that the Draupnir, a weapon Hilda entrusted to him to seal Loki once again is resonating with Aiolia, thus recognizing his younger brother as its rightful wielder. Aiolia returns to challenge Loki with the Draupnir at hand, the two exchanging blows until Loki apparently gains the opportunity for a killing blow when Lyfia appears to intervene. It is then revealed that Lyfia is no other than Odin's reincarnation on Earth, and Utgardar was aware of Loki's plot the whole time, thus he took his own life and turned into an Einherjar himself to conceal the Odin Robe inside his own body, which is found by Frodhi when he defeated him. Lyfia then entrusts the Odin Robe to Aiolia, who uses it to resume his battle with Loki.
12	"The Birth of the Sacred Treasure, the Gungnir Spear"; Transliteration: "Tanjō! Jingi Gunguniru no Yari" (Japanese: 誕生！神器グングニルの槍)	September 12, 2015
Wearing the Draupnir and Balmung Sword while clad in Odin's God Robe, Aiolia charges at Loki and gains the upper hand with his speed having increased. However, Aiolia does not have much time as the fruit hiding the Spear of Gungnir is about to ripen. Delivering several blows against the false god, Aiolia swears to take him down while Lyfia prays in order to bestow Odin's powers on the Gold Saint. However, she has not been Odin's representative for very long and finds herself weakening quickly. While Frodhi defends Lyfia from the Einherjar, Aiolia and Loki's vicious battle resumes until the fruit finally opens and reveal the Spear of Gungnir. Relieved to see the weapon finally uncovered, Loki's happiness is quickly turned into horror as Aiolia delivers a fatal blow that sends him falling down on the spear which impales him. Believing victory to have been achieved, Aiolia and Aiolos are shocked to see Loki emerging from the spear, having been recognized as its true master. The god then proceeds to deliver one crushing impact towards the two Gold Saints which shatters the Odin Robe in the process. With nothing to stop him, Loki finds Lyfia who has lost her strength bestowed by Odin and now prays. Blasting away Sigmund and Frodhi who attempt to defend her, Loki is shocked as his attack misses Lyfia by an inch. Hearing a familiar voice, he turns around to see Aiolia and Aiolos in their Gold Cloths again which were revived by Lyfia's prayers. Furious, Loki pursues the two Gold Saints and attempts to shoot a blast at Aiolia, but the attack instead is neutralized. Wondering what just happened, Loki suffers several other attacks until he notice his spear is resonating with something. Just then, all twelve Gold Saints surround Loki, revealing themselves to be alive and well. Asking how it is possible, the Gold Saints reveal that since he captured Aphrodite first, who is immune to poison, he was able to keep the other Gold Saints safe by keeping them in an apparent state of death. Angry at having failed to kill the Gold Saints, Loki prepares himself as all twelve Gold Saints state they will defend the world before the final battle begins.
13	"Let Our Prayers Be Heard! The Eternal Golden Legend!"; Transliteration: "Todoke Warera no Omoi! Eien no Ōgon Densetsu!" (Japanese: 届け我らの想い！永遠の黄金伝説！)	September 26, 2015
The final battle finally commences between Loki and the 12 Gold Saints, who charge in groups of two at the false god but fail to even scratch him. Raising the Spear of Gungnir, Loki easily knocks all 12 Gold Saints to the ground, but they survive due to Mu, Dohko, Camus and Shaka's defenses. Attempting to have Aiolia and the Gold Saints serving him, Loki suddenly notices flower petals covered in blood pouring down on the battlefield. The Gold Saints realise that Athena is using her blood absorbed from the amphora where Hades trapped her and has sent it to them, urging them to stand up once more. Tearful that their goddess willingly gave away her own blood for their sake, all 12 Gold Saints burn their Cosmo to the maximum limit and awaken their God Cloths which greatly surprises Loki as he finds himself wounded by each attack he suffers. As Hilda describes it, the Gold Cloths have become true God Cloths due to the flower petals Athena sent them, allowing them to unleash their truly divine powers. Loki attempts to flee the battle as he loses the upper hand, but is pierced by a combined attack from Aiolos and Saga before Aiolia leaps at the false god last, wearing Draupnir given to him by Mu. Unleashing his technique, the two clash violently until Loki begins losing the clash due to Lyfia, Asgard and the entire Earth giving their Cosmo to Aiolia. Feeling Earth's Cosmo flowing inside his body, Aiolia successfully defeats Loki once and for all, sealing him with the Draupnir before his Cloth reverts to normal. With the enemy vanquished and Asgard rescued, the Gold Saints begin to disappear, realizing that the life Odin had bestowed upon them was about to wear out. Accepting that they must now leave the Earth, they discuss that they would like to give Seiya and the Bronze Saints the Gold Cloths to aid them. Just then, the god of the seas Poseidon communicates with them, having been briefly awoken by their Cosmo. Promising to send the Gold Cloths to Elysium, the Gold Saints are grateful as they all leave until Aiolia remains. Giving a saddened Lyfia Aiolos' gemstone, Aiolia assures her that he will always be watching over her despite not being with her before he too disappears, leaving Lyfia devastated. Sometime after Athena and the Bronze Saints defeats Hades and the Grand Eclipse has disappeared, things return to normal in Asgard. Frodhi and Sigmund begin to train more Asgardian soldiers. Lyfia, now the Odin Representative on Earth, speaks to the villagers, saying they should forever remember the 12 brave Gold Saints who sacrificed their lives to ensure Asgard's safety.

== Release ==
This new series began streaming on April 11, 2015. Bandai Channel streamed the series in Japan, while Daisuki streamed it for the rest of the world. The latter offered subtitles in different languages, including English, Italian, Spanish, and Portuguese. Episodes were released in single format biweekly on Saturdays.
