= List of Martian Successor Nadesico episodes =

The front cover of Martian Successor Nadesico: The Complete Chronicles, which contains all 26 episodes of the series.

Martian Successor Nadesico is a science-fiction/comedy anime series that focuses on the exploits of a space battleship's inept crew in the year 2196, in particular Akito Tenkawa, one of the ship's mecha pilots who actually wants to be a cook and who constantly finds himself the center of the affections of the female members of the crew.

It was created by Kia Asamiya, directed by Tatsuo Satō and produced by Production I.G subsidiary XEBEC. The series was first broadcast on TV Tokyo between October 1, 1996, and March 24, 1997, lasting 26 episodes. Afterwards, it spawned a series of computer games; a manga adaptation; a spin-off OVA called Gekiganger III; and a film sequel entitled Martian Successor Nadesico: The Motion Picture – Prince of Darkness. Six DVDs of the series, followed by a complete boxset, were released by ADV Films.

The opening theme tune to Martian Successor Nadesico, "You Get to Burning" was sung Yumi Matsuzawa, with the closing theme, "Watashi Rashiku [Being Myself]" sung by Houko Kuwashima.

== Episodes ==
No.	Title	Original release date
1	"To Go 'Like a Man'!"; Transliteration: "'Saa, Otoko' ni Tatakaemasu!" (Japanese: 「男らしく」で いこう!)	October 1, 1996
In the battle against the Jovian Lizards, Nergal launches its battleship ND-001 Nadesico. The crew however are a bit troublesome, in particular Captain Yurika Misumaru. She bumps into her childhood love, Akito Tenkawa, who begins work on the ship as a cook, but he is soon forced to fight.
2	"Leave the 'Blue Earth' to Me"; Transliteration: "'Midori no Chikyū' wa Makasetoke" (Japanese: 「緑の地球」は任せとけ)	October 8, 1996
Yurika's father attempts to capture the Nadesico and use it as part of Earth's army. However, Nergal's accountant Mr. Prospector announces that they instead plan to go to Mars on their own.
3	"A 'Goodbye' That Came Too Soon!"; Transliteration: "Hayasugiru 'Sayonara'!" (Japanese: 早すぎる「さよなら」!)	October 15, 1996
Yurika plans to break through Earth's main line of defense, the "Big Barrier". Akito attempts to help, even if that means fighting Jun Aoi, who is in love with Yurika.
4	"'Charmed' by Aqua Space"; Transliteration: "Mizuiro Uchū ni 'Tokimeki'" (Japanese: 水色宇宙に「ときめき」)	October 22, 1996
When Gai is murdered, Akito goes into mourning and later develops a relationship with communications officer Megumi. Also, some new crew members are arriving to join the Nadesico's mecha defenses - the Aestivalis.
5	"Ruri's 'Navigation Logs'"; Transliteration: "Ruri-chan 'Kōkai Nisshi'" (Japanese: ルリちゃん「航海日誌」)	October 29, 1996
Yurika is forced to conduct a wide range of funerals after the Nadesico's previous battle. Things are made worse when Chief Science Officer Ruri tells her that the main job of the captain is to act as a figurehead, and she has no real power.
6	"Sort of Like a 'Fateful Decision'"; Transliteration: "'Unmei no Sentaku' Mitai na" (Japanese: 「運命の選択」みたいな)	November 5, 1996
The Nadesico crew land on Mars and go to Nergal's old offices on Olympus Mons. Prospector talks about the origins of the ship, while Akito and Megumi discover an old researcher, Inez Fressange, who joins the crew.
7	"The 'Song That You Will Sing' One Day"; Transliteration: "Itsuka Omae ga 'Utau Uta'" (Japanese: いつかお前が「歌う詩」)	November 12, 1996
As the crew go and try to rescue a missing ship, Akito discovers that the Nadesico's admiral, Fukube, was responsible for destroying his home when the Jovians invaded Mars.
8	"The Luke Warm 'Cold Equation'"; Transliteration: "Nurume no 'Tsumetai Hōteishiki'" (Japanese: 温めの「冷たい方程式」)	November 19, 1996
Nergal has finished making an improved warship and have now joined forces with Earth's military. Akito meanwhile discovers himself on the dark side of the Moon, and the Nadesico has some more crew members added, but they are not to their liking.
9	"The Miracle Operator of 'the Kiss?'"; Transliteration: "Kiseki no Sakusen 'Kisu ka?'" (Japanese: 奇跡の作戦「キスか?」)	November 26, 1996
The Nadesico is ordered to rescue a goodwill ambassador, while Akito finds himself in some unusual roleplay with Megumi and Yurika.
10	"The Dangers of 'Femininity'"; Transliteration: "'Onna Rashiku' ga Abunai" (Japanese: 「女らしく」がアブナイ)	December 3, 1996
When the crew are sent to a tropical island as part of a mission, Akito finds himself involved with a woman named Aqua. However, it turns out that she is slightly insane, and wants to die alongside her new love.
11	"Finding Yourself in a 'Routine Plot'"; Transliteration: "Ki ga Tsukeba 'Oyakusoku'?" (Japanese: 気がつけば「お約束」?)	December 10, 1996
The Nadesico crew have the challenge of destroying a weapon so powerful that it creates a black hole when it fires.
12	"Those 'Unforgettable Days'"; Transliteration: "Ano 'Wasureenu Hibi'" (Japanese: あの「忘れえぬ日々」)	December 17, 1996
The Nadesico's intelligent computer system, Omoikane, begins to malfunction. The solution is to overhaul the entire system, but Ruri is worried that it will affect Omoikane's personality, so she asks Akito to help protect it.
13	"There is No 'Single Truth'"; Transliteration: "'Shinjitsu' wa Hitotsu ja nai" (Japanese: 「真実」は一つじゃない)	December 24, 1996
As the crew prepare to celebrate Christmas, Akito learns that Yurika, Megumi and Ryoko want to spend it with him, while at the same time Inez wants him to perform an important experiment.
14	"Let's Go with 'Hot Blooded Anime' (Clip Show)"; Transliteration: "'Nekketsu Anime' de Ikō" (Japanese: 「熱血アニメ」でいこう)	December 31, 1996
A tour of the Nadesico is taken, while the episode is watched by characters in Gekigangar III.
15	"The 'Significant Other' from a Star Far Away"; Transliteration: "Tōi Hoshi kara Kita 'Kareshi'" (Japanese: 遠い星からきた「彼氏」)	January 7, 1997
A connection between the Jovians and Gekigangar III is confirmed when the ship's crew discover an intruder called Tsukumo Shiratori, who happens to look exactly like Gai.
16	"The Beginning of 'Nadesico's War'"; Transliteration: "'Boku-tachi no Sensō' ga Hajimaru" (Japanese: 「僕達の戦争」が始まる)	January 14, 1997
Tsukumo, Megumi and Minato go to Jovian territory and learn that the Jovian were humans banished from the Moon. On the Nadesico, there are plans to return to Mars.
17	"A 'Reunion That Came Too Late'"; Transliteration: "Sore wa 'Ososugita Saikai'" (Japanese: それは「遅すぎた再会」)	January 21, 1997
The crew are in shock to find the Jovians are in fact humans, resulting in the admiral, Munetake, to go mad for fear of losing his job. He therefore orders head of maintenance Seiya to complete a pet project of his in order to defeat them.
18	"Echoes of 'Self', Echoes of Water"; Transliteration: "Mizu no Oto wa 'Watashi' no Oto" (Japanese: 水の音は「私」の音)	January 28, 1997
Ruri discovers who her genetic parents are, and begins to learn her own history. This leads to worries that she will leave the Nadesico behind.
19	"You're the Next 'Captain' of the Nadesico"; Transliteration: "Asu no 'Kanchō' wa Kimi da!" (Japanese: 明日の「艦長」は君だ!)	February 4, 1997
A contest is held to find on the Nadesico which Yurika thinks the prize is to be captain of the ship for a day. In fact, the contest is designed to find someone more competent to replace her.
20	"Run Silent, Run Deep"; Transliteration: "Fukaku Shizuka ni 'Sentō' Seyo" (Japanese: 深く静かに「戦闘」せよ)	February 11, 1997
When the Jovians begin to develop new technology, Yurika is inspired by fishing in order to solve the problem.
21	"The Meadows We Once Ran Across"; Transliteration: "Itsuka Hashitta 'Sōgen'" (Japanese: いつか走った「草原」)	February 18, 1997
When the Nadesico plans to destroy more enemy ships by luring them into traps, some of the crew begin to claim that they are seeing ghosts. This episode has a nonlinear narrative.
22	"Protect the Visitor?"; Transliteration: "'Raihōsha' o Mamorinuke?" (Japanese: 「来訪者」を守り抜け?)	February 25, 1997
Tsukumo's younger sister Yukina lands on the Nadesico in the hope of killing Minato. When she changes her mind, Yurika hopes Yukina may help the Earth forces act more peacefully, but instead they attack the Nadesico.
23	"A Place We Call Home"; Transliteration: "'Furusato' to Yoberu Basho" (Japanese: 「故郷」と呼べる場所)	March 3, 1997
The crew are now being kept under supervision by Nergal. However, with some help from Seiya, Ruri helps inspire the crew to mutiny and regain control of the Nadesico.
24	"Ubiquitous Righteousness"; Transliteration: "Doko ni demo Aru 'Seigi'" (Japanese: どこにでもある「正義」)	March 10, 1997
Yurika plans to launch peace talks with the Jovians, using Gekigangar III as a link between the people of Earth and of Jupiter. The Jovians instead want nothing except Earth's complete surrender and assassinate Tsukumo.
25	"Being Myself, Being Yourself"; Transliteration: "'Watashi Rashiku' Jibun Rashiku" (Japanese: 「私らしく」自分らしく)	March 17, 1997
In a final attempt to bring peace, the Nadesico and Nergal travel to Mars in order to destroy the one thing that could swing the war. However, Nergal prevent Nadesico's plans from destruction.
26	"For the Lady We Will Meet Someday"; Transliteration: "Itsuka Au Anata no Tame ni" (Japanese: 「いつか逢う貴女のために」)	March 24, 1997
Akito finally learns from Inez the truth about everything concerning his time on the Nadesico, but in order to bring calm between Earth and Jupiter, he and Yurika have to kiss.

== See also ==
- List of Martian Successor Nadesico characters
