= Jūrōta Kosugi =

Japanese voice actor (born 1957)

- 小杉 十郎太
- Born: December 19, 1957 (age 68); Yokohama, Japan
- Occupation: Voice actor
- Years active: 1985–present

Jūrōta Kosugi (小杉 十郎太, Kosugi Jūrōta; born December 19, 1957 in Yokohama, Japan) is a Japanese voice actor. His major roles include Arlong in One Piece, Asuma Sarutobi in Naruto, Akio Ohtori in Revolutionary Girl Utena, Isamu Kenmochi in Kindaichi Case Files, Big Zenki in Zenki, and Jotaro Kujo in JoJo's Bizarre Adventure (OVA). In video games, he provides the voice of Nobunaga Oda in the Samurai Warriors and Warriors Orochi series. He also provides the Japanese voice for Billy Blanks, David Duchovny, Tony Leung Chiu-wai and Luke Perry. He was also the first dub-over artist of Daniel Craig and Andy Lau in their early days.

== Filmography ==
=== Anime ===
List of voice performances in anime
Year	Series	Role	Notes	Source
1985	Mobile Suit Zeta Gundam	Henken Bekkener, Narrator	Debut role	
1985–1987	Touch	Terajima		
1985	Dirty Pair series	Darain		
1985	Bavi Stock	Aizman	OAV	
1987	Metal Armor Dragonar	Malliot Plato		
1987	Bubblegum Crisis	Frederick		
1987–1988	Hiatari Ryoukou!	Takanesawa		
1988	Ronin Warriors	Rajura		
1988	Legend of Galactic Heroes	Lintz		
1989	Kyomu Senshi Miroku	Nezu Jinpachi		
1989	Riding Bean	?		
1989	Legend of Heavenly Sphere Shurato	Mayuri		
1989	Blood Reign: Curse of the Yoma	Shiranui		
1989	Fūma no Kojirō	Kagerō (Yasha's underling)		
1989–1991	Ariel	Krest Saber Hargen	OAVs Visual and Deluxe	
1989	Earthian	K-001		
1989–1990	The Guyver: Bio-Booster Armor	Elegen	Eps. 4-6	
1990	Sol Bianca	Rammy		
1990–1991	Kyatto Ninden Teyandee	Sukashī		
1992	Tekkaman Blade	Molotov/Tekkaman Lance		
1992	Ashita e Free Kick	Chris Becken		
1992	Joker: Marginal City	Dr. Bayfarm	OAV	
1992–1993	Ys II: Castle in the Heavens	Goto Dabbi		
1993	Mobile Suit Victory Gundam	Kwan Lee		
1993	Yaiba	Kojirou		
1993	Gakusaver	Wercurey	OAV	
1993–1994, 2000–2001	JoJo's Bizarre Adventure	Jotaro Kujo	OVA	
1993	Please Save My Earth	Tamura		
1994	Natsuki Crisis	Yanagisawa Masaaki		
1994	Haō Taikei Ryū Knight	Izumi		
1994	Mobile Fighter G Gundam	Mirabo		
1994	Iria: Zeiram the Animation	Glen		
1994	Magic Knight Rayearth	Lantis, Sol Zagato		
1994	Shippū! Iron Leaguer Ginhikari no Hata no Shita ni	Top Joy		
1994	Key the Metal Idol	Sergey (D)		
1994	Sins of the Sisters	Daisuke Karino	OAV ep. 2	
1994–1995	My Sexual Harassment	Honma		
1995	Gulliver Boy	Judau		
1995	Zenki	Zenki (big)		
1995	Ninku	Touji Ninku	Also movies	
1995	Slayers	Moranboran		
1995	Golden Boy	Kigure Hiroshi	OAV	
1995	Haō Taikei Ryū Knight: Adieu's Legend II	Mizuki	OAV	
1995	Fire Emblem	Oguma	OAV series	
1996	Case Closed	Saeki	Ep. 37	
1996	The Vision of Escaflowne	Dryden Fassa		
1996	Kimera	Kianu		
1996–1997	Martian Successor Nadesico	Goat Hoary		
1997	Revolutionary Girl Utena	Akio Ohtori		
1997–present	Kindaichi Case Files series	Isamu Kenmochi	Except 1996 anime film	
1997–1999	Agent Aika	Gusto Turbulence		
1997	Fushigi Yuugi	Tenkou	2nd OAV series	
1997	Flame of Recca	Resshin		
1997	Rurouni Kenshin: The Motion Picture	Tamono Eibin		
1997	Knights of Ramune	Don Vodka		
1998	Trigun	Joey		
1998	Legend of Basara	Shido		
1998	Queen Emeraldas	Gamoru		
1998	Blue Submarine No. 6	Jean-Jacques Bernard		
1998	Glass Mask	Masumi Hayami	OVA	
1998	Gekiganger III	Prof. Kokubunji	OVA	
1999	Crest of the Stars	Admiral Trife		
1999	I'm Gonna Be An Angel!	Papa		
1999–2000	Monster Farm	Muu		
1999	Sorcerer on the Rocks	Icarus		
2000	One Piece	Arlong		
2000	Brigadoon	Skiar		
2000	Descendants of Darkness	Narrator		
2000	Ghost Stories	Piano Ghost	Ep. 5	
2001	Touch Cross Road: Kaze no Yukue	Jose		
2001	Project ARMS	Kurou		
2001	Banner of the Stars II	Trife		
2001	Sadamitsu the Destroyer	Tsubaki Akinobu		
2001	Real Bout High School	Keiichiro Nagumo		
2001	The Prince of Tennis	Sakaki Tarou		
2002	Jing: King of Bandits	Captain		
2002	Demon Lord Dante	Samael		
2002	Heat Guy J	Noriega		
2002–2007	Naruto	Asuma Sarutobi		
2003	Stellvia	Umihito Katase		
2003	Sonic X	Pale Bay Leaf		
2003	Kino's Journey	Father of the groom		
2003–2004	Lament of the Lamb	Eda Shin	OVA	
2004	Shadow	Gisuke	OAV	
2004	Fafner in the Azure	Youji Hino		
2004	Tristia of the Deep-Blue Sea	Stuka		
2004	Samurai Champloo	Xavier III		
2004	Tsukuyomi: Moon Phase	Midou Yayoi		
2004	Gankutsuou: The Count of Monte Cristo	Fernand		
2005	Iriya no Sora, UFO no Natsu	Juurou Kisaragi		
2005	MÄR	Allan		
2005	Eureka Seven	Charles Beams		
2005	Trinity Blood	Francesco di Medici		
2005	Blood+	David		
2005	Ginban Kaleidoscope	Takashima		
2006	Lemon Angel Project	Tsuchiya	Young Jump version	
2006	Futari wa Pretty Cure Splash Star	Kintoresukī		
2006–2014	Kenichi: The Mightiest Disciple	Akisame Kōetsuji	Also OVAs and films	
2007–2012	Naruto: Shippuden	Asuma Sarutobi		
2007–2012	Higurashi no Naku Koroni series	Okonogi	Kai, Rei, and Kira	
2008	Zero no Tsukaima Princess no Rondo	Joseph		
2008	Junjou Romantica 2	Fuyuhiko Usami		
2009	Umineko: When They Cry	Krauss Ushiromiya		
2009	Nyan Koi!	Kirishima Keizou		
2010	Nura: Rise of the Yokai Clan: Demon Capital	Tsuchigumo		
2010	Zettai Karen Children	Taizo Kiristubo		
2011	Tiger & Bunny	Legend		
2011	Toriko	Mansam		
2011	Yu-Gi-Oh! Zexal	Mr. Heartland		
2012	La storia della Arcana Famiglia	Dante		
2013	Cuticle Detective Inaba	Lorenzo		
2013	Senran Kagura: Ninja Flash!	Dougen		
2013	Hayate the Combat Butler: Cuties	Tama		
2013	Samurai Flamenco	Kaname Jouji/Red Axe		
2014	The Pilot's Love Song	Luis de Alarcon		
2014	Lord Marksman and Vanadis	Urz Vorn		
2014	Mysterious Joker	Professor Clover		
2015	Junjou Romantica 3	Fuyuhiko Usami		
2016	Magic of Stella	Option Window	Ep. 3	
2018–2019	Layton Mystery Tanteisha: Katori no Nazotoki File	Sherlo		

=== Film ===
List of voice performances in feature films
Year	Series	Role	Notes	Source
1998	Martian Successor Nadesico: The Motion Picture – Prince of Darkness	Goat Hoary		
2001	Case Closed: Countdown to Heaven	Kazama Hidehiko		
2004	Appleseed	Briareos		
2005	Mobile Suit Zeta Gundam: A New Translation	Henken Beckner, Narrator	three-part movie series	
2020	Crayon Shin-chan: Crash! Rakuga Kingdom and Almost Four Heroes	The Minister of Energy		
2025	Cute High Earth Defense Club Eternal Love!	Deathamor		

=== Drama CDs ===
List of voice performances in drama CDs
Series	Role	Notes	Source
Get Backers	Beast Howling		
Combination	Keiji Sasaki		
Haō Taikei Ryū Knight	Izumi		
Happy Boy	Toraji		
Heian Mato Karakuri Kidan	Bigen		
Kodomotachi wa Yoru no Juunin	Ryuu		
Romantist Taste			
Revolutionary Girl Utena: Engage Toi a Mes Contes	Akio Ohtori		
Unjou Roukaku Kidan	Gurangia		
Vampire Hunter Gaiden: Shukumei no tabibito Donovan	Donovan		
Weiß Kreuz	Persia		

=== Tokusatsu ===
List of voice performances in Tokusatsu
Year	Series	Role	Notes	Source
1994	Kamen Rider World	Rebirth Cobra Man Garai	OV	
1994	Super Sentai World	Saigan, Red Hawk	OV	
1995	Chouriki Sentai Ohranger	Bara Builder	Ep. 19	
2004	Kamen Rider Blade	Narrator		
2009	Samurai Sentai Shinkenger	Ayakashi Yumebakura	Ep. 25-26	
2010	Tensou Sentai Goseiger	Matroid Robogōgu of the 10-sai	Eps. 33-43	
2012	Tokumei Sentai Go-Busters	Dumbbellloid	Ep. 21	
2016	Shuriken Sentai Ninninger vs. ToQger The Movie: Ninjas in Wonderland	Youkai Wanyūdō	Movie	

=== Video games ===
List of voice performances in video games
Year	Series	Role	Notes	Source
1994	Team Innocent: The Point of No Return	Sigrus Grant	PC-FX	
1995	Quo Vadis	Ovan	Sega Saturn	
1996	Shin Fortune Quest	J.B. Cobolt	PlayStation	
1997	Super Robot Taisen F		PlayStation, Sega Saturn	
1997	Grandia	Colonel Mullen	Sega Saturn	
1998	Revolutionary Girl Utena	Akio Ohtori	Sega Saturn	
1998	Martian Successor Nadesico: The Blank of 3 Years	Goat Hoary	Sega Saturn	
1998	Legend of Legaia	Cort		
1998	Atelier Elie	Endelk	PlayStation	
2000–present	One Piece series	Arlong		
2002	Tokimeki Memorial Girl's Side	Amanohashi Ikkaku		
2002–	Tantei Jingūji Saburō series	Saburō Jingūji	Except for Ashes and Diamonds	
2003	Naruto: Ultimate Ninja	Asuma Sarutobi	PlayStation 2	
2004–	Samurai Warriors series	Nobunaga Oda		
2004	Darkstalkers Chronicle: The Chaos Tower		PSP	
2005	Wild Arms 4	Lambda Zellweger	PlayStation 2	
2007	Warriors Orochi	Nobunaga Oda	PlayStation 2	
2009	007: Quantum of Solace	James Bond	Japanese dub, also other James Bond video games	
2009	Atelier Rorona: The Alchemist of Arland	Sterkenburg Cranach	Also in Atelier Totori, Atelier Meruru and Warriors Orochi 3 Ultimate	
2011–2013	La storia della Arcana Famiglia series	Dante		
2014	Granblue Fantasy	Nezahualpilli	iOS, Android, Web Browser	
2014	Sonic Boom: Shattered Crystal	Lyric	3DS	
2014	Sonic Boom: Rise of Lyric	Lyric	Wii U	
2015	JoJo's Bizarre Adventure: Eyes of Heaven	Norisuke Higashikata IV	PlayStation 3, PlayStation 4	
2016	Overwatch	McCree	Japanese dub	

=== Overseas dubbing ===
List of dub performances in overseas productions
Series	Role	Notes	Source
In the Mood for Love	Chow Mo-wan	Voice dub for Tony Leung	
Hero	Zanken	Voice dub for Tony Leung	
Sound of Colors	Ming	Voice dub for Tony Leung	
2046	Chow Mo-wan	Voice dub for Tony Leung	
The Grandmaster	Ip Man	Voice dub for Tony Leung	
Ally McBeal	Richard Fish	Voice dub for Greg Germann	
Beverly Hills, 90210	Dylan McKay	Voice dub for Luke Perry	
The Big Lebowski	Donny Kerabatsos	Voice dub for Steve Buscemi	
Billy's Boot Camp Elite	Billy Blanks	Voice dub for Billy Blanks	
Californication	Hank	Voice dub for David Duchovny	
Casino Royale	James Bond	Voice dub for Daniel Craig	
The Constant Gardener	Justin Quayle	Voice dub for Ralph Fiennes	
Cowboys & Aliens	Jake Lonergan	Voice dub for Daniel Craig	
Crash	Sgt. John Ryan	Voice dub for Matt Dillon	
Cronos	Dieter de la Guardia	Voice dub for Claudio Brook	
Das Experiment	Steinhoff	Voice dub for Christian Berkel	
Delgo	General Bogardus		
Donkey Kong Country	King K. Rool		
Dragon Tiger Gate	Dragon Wong	Voice dub for Donnie Yen	
The Duchess	William Cavendish	Voice dub for Ralph Fiennes	
Evolution	Colonel Dr. Ira Kane	Voice dub for David Duchovny	
Fargo	Carl Showalter	Voice dub for Steve Buscemi	
Gentlemen Broncos	Dr. Ronald Chevalier	Voice dub for Jemaine Clement	
Get Smart	Agent 23	Voice dub for Dwayne Johnson; 2011 TV Asahi edition	
Grey's Anatomy	Preston Burke	Voice dub for Isaiah Washington	
The Hard Corps	Phillippe Sauvage	Voice dub for Jean-Claude Van Damme	
Hulk	Hulk	Voice dub for Eric Bana	
In America	Mateo Kuamey	Voice dub for Djimon Hounsou	
In Bruges	Harry Waters	Voice dub for Ralph Fiennes	
The Joneses	Steve Jones	Voice dub for David Duchovny	
Jumong	Chumon		
Killing Me Softly	Ada Tallis	Voice dub for Joseph Fiennes	
Lara Croft: Tomb Raider – The Cradle of Life	Terry Sheridan	Voice dub for Gerard Butler	
Layer Cake	XXXX	Voice dub for Daniel Craig	
Lost & Found	Rene	Voice dub for Patrick Bruel	
Lovers	Liu	Voice dub for Andy Lau	
Michel Vaillant	Michel Vaillant	Voice dub for Sagamore Stévenin	
Mission: Impossible	Ethan Hunt	Voice dub for Tom Cruise	
Monrak Transistor	Suwat	Voice dub for Somlek Sakdikul	
On Her Majesty's Secret Service (DVD Edition)	James Bond	Voice dub for George Lazenby	
Plunkett & Macleane	Will Plunkett	Voice dub for Robert Carlyle	
Quantum of Solace	James Bond	Voice dub for Daniel Craig	
Red Dragon	Francis Dolarhyde	Voice dub for Ralph Fiennes	
Scream 2	Cotton Weary	Voice dub for Liev Schreiber	
Scream 3	Cotton Weary	Voice dub for Liev Schreiber	
Strike Back	Oliver Sinclair	Voice dub for Rhashan Stone	
Suburra	Filippo Malgradi	Voice dub for Pierfrancesco Favino	
Tarzan & Jane	Tarzan		
There's Something About Mary	Pat Healy	Voice dub for Matt Dillon	
Transporter 2	Gianni	Voice dub for Alessandro Gassmann	
The Usual Suspects	Todd Hockney	Voice dub for Kevin Pollak	
VeggieTales			
The X-Files	Fox Mulder	Voice dub for David Duchovny	
