= Super Robot Wars W =

2007 video game

- Developer: Banpresto
- Publisher: JP: Banpresto
- Platform: Nintendo DS
- Release: JP: March 1, 2007
- Genre: Tactical role-playing game
- Mode: Single player

Super Robot Wars W (スーパーロボット大戦 W, Sūpā Robotto Taisen Daburyū) is part of the Super Robot Wars franchise and was published for the Nintendo DS by Banpresto. It is the first Super Robot Wars game released for the Nintendo DS. Like some DS games, special features can be unlocked by starting a new game with any of the Game Boy Advance era games inserted into SLOT 2. On February 27 2022 a fan-translated English patch was released.

== Story ==
Space Calendar (SC) 99. In the previous age, the governments of Earth formed the Federated Earth Nation (FEN) to bring World War III to an end. After putting down the defiant lunar colony, the Federation Space Calendar was instituted. To alleviate environmental pressures and overpopulation, the FEN began expanding into space, constructing space colonies and asteroid cities, as well as an Orbital Space Ring around the Earth, and the development and terraforming of the Moon and Mars. This was accomplished in a short time, due to quantum leaps in physics and energy research.

But repression of those living in the colonies by the FEN ignited a war between factions in space, and OZ, the true leaders of the FEN. This "Revolutionary War" ended in the year 98, with the death of FEN President Treize Khushrenada. From Treize's will, a New United Nations was formed, returning power back to the individual states.

But the new Earth Sphere's troubles seemed to multiply. The Earth Sphere was invaded by the Radam, who seized control of the Orbital Space Ring, and the invaders known as the Jovian Lizards, who destroyed the Mars Colony. In addition, internal strife, such as the arbitrary distinction between Coordinators and Naturals, and mechanized terrorism, seem to be taking the New United Nations to the breaking point.

On June 13, SC 99, Kazuma Ardygun and his family, a group of Trailers, are tasked with the job of escorting Quatre Raberba Winner and Duo Maxwell, disguised as "Heero Yuy", to Earth...

== Banpresto Originals ==
=== Main characters ===
- Kazuma Ardygun
  - At 16 years of age, Kazuma is the Ardygun family's only son and protagonist of the game. Very sloppy and rash in his decisions, his goal is to become a great Trailer like his father, Blessfield, known as the "legendary Trailer". On his father's request, he writes in a journal everyday, recording all of the events that have transpired. He is the main pilot behind the Valhawk mobile unit.
  - After Blessfield sacrifices himself in a battle, the weight of depression and shock of the event forces Kazuma to leave the family. He winds up with the Serpent Tail mercenary group, going by the name of "Kite". A year later, he reunites with the rest of the Ardygun family, and proceeds to battle against the antagonist Database.
- Mihiro Ardygun
  - The youngest daughter in the Ardygun family, 10-year-old Mihiro supports her brother, Kazuma, on the battlefield by serving as the secondary pilot in the Valhawk, controlling the aiming and evasive programs. After Kazuma disappears when their father dies, she takes over the piloting responsibilities on the Valhawk; once Kazuma returns, she becomes the co-pilot again.
- Blessfield Ardygun
  - Patriarch to the Ardygun family, 45-year-old Blessfield is known the "legendary Trailer", having earned the nickname "Hawk's Eye". Serving as the captain of the family's battleship Valstork, he has several friends in high places from a variety of organizations. Blessfield was originally a space pirate, who carried out his own sense of justice, but settled down once he met his future wife Yūmi and became a Trailer.
  - Blessfield carries an innate ability called Boson Jump (an ability derived from the Martian Successor Nadesico series), allowing him to instantaneously travel backwards through time; unfortunately, jumping forward through time is impossible, as the future has yet to exist. During a major battle, he protects Kazuma from an imminent explosion, and safely avoids it by instantly jumping back 15 billion years into the past. Blessfield almost loses hope, until meeting an ancient civilization called the E's, teaching him the importance of memories. Working alongside them, he creates the Knowledge Records and Record Plant, bringing the Database to life. The Valstork battleship is made at the same time, thus establishing his legacy, to be eventually handed down to his descendants in the future, 15 billion years later.
- Shihomi Ardygun
  - The oldest daughter in the Ardygun family, 22-year-old Shihomi is aware of her duties as the eldest child. She serves as the main operator aboard the Valstork. After Blessfield's disappearance, she becomes the captain of the battleship and head of the family.
- Akane Ardygun
  - The second oldest daughter in the Ardygun family, 20-year-old Akane is a rather cheerful, but stern woman. She serves as the weapons operator aboard the Valstork. According to her, she prefers a tough man, and her gullible personality makes her an easy target for Horis Horian's teasing. She's also troubled about her chest size, something Horis constantly jokes about. She also happens to be a fan of Uppo-kun, the mascot at the Wateropolis amusement park.
- Horis Horian
  - 24-year-old Horis is currently employed by the Ardygun family. Very knowledgeable about many things, he serves as the navigational operator aboard the Valstork and has excellent control over the battleship. Formerly an intelligence agent from OZ, he infiltrated aboard the Valstork to investigate its technology and capabilities, but decided to stay, due to the growing attachment he had towards the Ardyguns and how nice they treated him.
- Carret
  - This general-purpose robot acts as the communications and signal analysis officer aboard the Valstork and Valhawk. Carret's appearance is perhaps modeled after the mascots of the Mobile Suit Gundam franchise, Haro

=== Antagonists ===
- Aria Advance
  - With an appearance of a 16-year-old, Aria is one of the frontline commanders of the Database, piloting the customized Arm Arcus machine. She considers Applicant her father, usually addressing him as "papa". Because of the mechanical ways the Database operates, she is very ignorant on the subject of relationships, though she is oddly fond of Mihiro during their encounters, but extremely cold towards Kazuma.
- Regulate (レギュレイト)
  - The program Regulate acts as an enforcer, and has a mother-like personality. Whenever Applicant goes to fight in the frontlines, she is sent alongside to support him. She bears an odd resemblance to Yūmi, Blessfield's deceased wife.
- Applicant (アプリカント)
  - The program Applicant is in charge of managing throughout the Database. The pilot of the Arm Stora battleship, he acts as the parent to Aria.
- Inference (インファレンス)
  - The commander of the Record Plant, Inference is the leader behind the Database, piloting the giant Scentia. Usually calm, though has the tendency to act irrational when angered, he bears some resemblance to both Kazuma and Aria.
- Critic (クリティック)
  - He endorses Inference's actions and is also a member of the Database. Because his personality clashes with his position in the Database, he has been suspected by other members to have ulterior motives.

=== Original Mecha ===
- Valhawk
  - A transformable machine piloted by two people. Its main mode is called the "Cross Combat Mode" and this is its default mode. It also has a high speed flight mode "Air Force Mode". Its main source of power is a Proton Drive and is capable of combining with the Valstork using a battle formation called "Pattern Cross" .
  - It was created by Blessfield after he was sent 15 billion years into the past. It was produced after blueprints hidden in the Valstork were found.
- Valstork
  - A mysterious battleship Blessfield inherits from his father and used by the Ardygun family. Its main source of power is a Proton Drive and is capable of combining with the Valhawk using a battle formation called "Pattern Cross". It was created by Blessfield after he was sent 15 billion years into the past.
- Valguard
  - The result of the combination of the Valhawk and the Valstork, after initiating a battle formation called "Pattern Cross". Kazuma takes over the main controls and is the main pilot. It's able to combine with the Arm Arcus and Arm Stora after initiating a battle formation called "Pattern Final".
- Arm Arcus
  - Aria's personal machine. It is able to combine with the Valguard and the Arm Stora after initiating a battle formation called "Pattern Final".
- Arm Stora
  - A ship powered by a Proton Nova Drive, it is able to combine with the Valguard and the Arm Arcus after initiating a battle formation called "Pattern Final".
- Valzacard
  - The result of the combination of the Valguard, the Arm Stora, and the Arm Arcus, after initiating a battle formation called "Pattern Final". Kazuma takes over the main controls, and is the main pilot for the Valzacard. Towering at 212.7m, the Valzacard is the biggest leading mecha in "Banpresto Original" history.

== Series Included ==
- Banpresto Originals
- Shin Getter Robo (Manga version, piloted by Ryoma Nagare, Hayato Jin, and Benkei Kuruma)
- Mazinkaiser
  - Mazinkaiser: Fight to the Death! The Great General of Darkness
- Mobile Suit Gundam SEED
  - Mobile Suit Gundam SEED Astray (debut)
  - Mobile Suit Gundam SEED X Astray (debut)
- Gundam Wing: Endless Waltz
- Martian Successor Nadesico
  - Martian Successor Nadesico: The Motion Picture – Prince of Darkness
- The King of Braves GaoGaiGar
  - The King of Braves GaoGaiGar Final
- Full Metal Panic!
  - Full Metal Panic? Fumoffu
  - Full Metal Panic! The Second Raid (debut)
- Tekkaman Blade
  - Tekkaman Blade II (debut)
- Detonator Orgun (debut)
- Beast King GoLion (debut)

W marks the first Super Robot Wars game (aside from the Original Generation sub-series) to feature no machines from any series produced before 1980. The only characters from a pre-1980s series to appear are the Getter team, piloting the Shin Getter as they did in the 1990s manga. This game also marks the second Super Robot Wars title not to feature any Universal Century Gundam series, the first of which being Super Robot Wars J. It is also the first in the franchise which features no series produced by veteran anime director Yoshiyuki Tomino. It was also the first game in the series in which every series included had been licensed, in whole or in part, in North America at the time of the game's own release.

== Gameplay ==
Unlike previous games, the interface is changed slightly to make use of the Nintendo DS's dual screens. While the player may still use the directional pad and buttons, the game also allows for the use of the touch screen stylus. The mini-map feature in previous titles is now fixed on the DS's top screen. When two units engage in battle, the battle sequence is shown on the top screen, while the bottom screen shows a quick summary of the stats of both units, including hit percentages. The screens may be swapped via the system menu.

The game includes the "Combo Attack" system from previous Super Robot Wars titles for the Game Boy Advance. Unlike the system in those games, however, the attacker does not need to target units lined up in a row; instead, all units standing adjacent to one another are applicable, with the maximum number being determined by the pilot's Combo Attack level. An additional "Bazaar Shop", similar to the one seen in Super Robot Wars Alpha Gaiden, is unlockable after completing certain requirements. This shop allows players to buy a selection of units that normally only enemies use. Lastly, the "Favorites Series" system, introduced in Super Robot Wars MX, returns.

Super Robot Wars W also adds the "Support Request" ability, working similar to the "Support Attack/Defense" system, but allows one unit to call in a supporting attack/defense from a unit held in reserve, but not already sortied into the battlefield. Support Request can only be used once per scenario for each time the pilot has the ability. Debuting with Super Robot Wars W is the "Double Slot System". When a player goes to the intermission screen (either by completing a stage or loading a saved game) with one of the Game Boy Advance Super Robot Wars games in the DS's "SLOT 2", a bonus item and extra credits are rewarded. The properties of the item vary depending on which game is used, and are named after the game they are from.

One noticeable change in the plot is the story in Super Robot Wars W is separated into two timelines, allowing some of the series (like Nadesico, GaoGaiGar, Tekkaman Blade, Full Metal Panic) to continue in their respective sequels. The Gundam SEED storyline only exists in the second part, even though some characters appear in the first half.
