= Marina Del Ray =

Japanese band

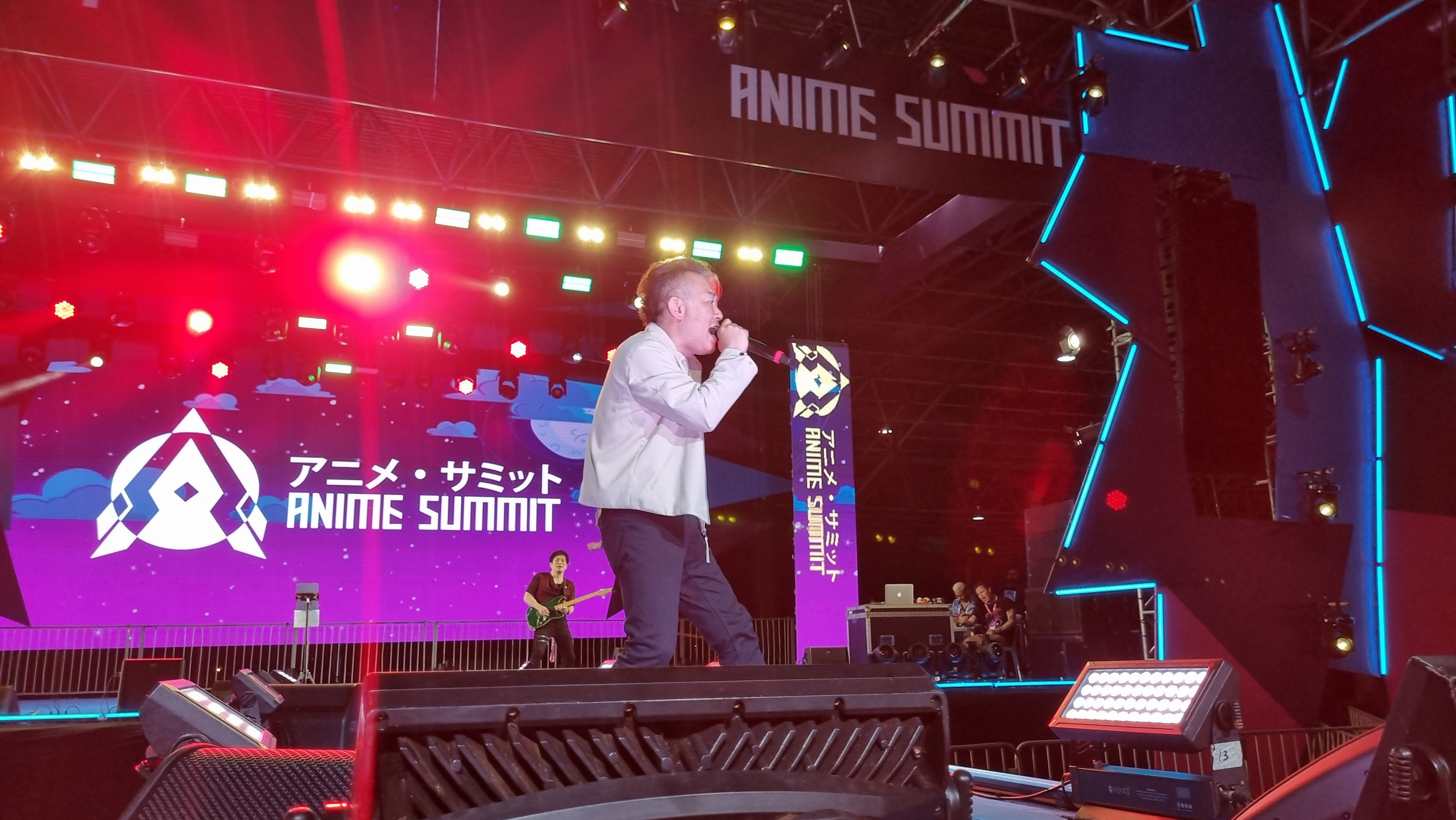
- Marina Del Ray at Anime Summit 2024

Background information
- Origin: Japan
- Genres: Anison; pop rock; hard rock
- Years active: 1991–present
- Members: Kacky and Tatsuology

Marina Del Ray is a Japanese band founded in 1991 by vocalist Kacky and guitarist Tatsuology. They are best known for having made songs for Saint Seiya animes, such as the opening for the Hades saga, "Megami no Senshi ~Pegasus Forever~" and the ending for Saint Seiya: The Lost Canvas, "Hana no Kusari", with Maki Ikuno.

The duo began their career in anime by making several songs for Ring ni Kakero series, another anime based on Masami Kurumada's work.

In 2023, Yumi Matsuzawa released a cover of "Hana no Kusari".

In 2016, they performed at Saint Seiya Docks in Hong Kong along with Hironobu Kageyama, celebrating 30 years of the series.

In the same year, they partnered with Masami Kurumada again and recorded a series of songs for the anime Fūma no Kojirō.

In 2024, they performed in Brazil for the first time at Anime Summit in Brasília. At the event, they were interviewed in the podcast Mitsubukai, where they revealed they wrote the song "Megami no Senshi ~Pegasus Forever~" with Masami Kurumada himself.

== List of songs in anime ==
- "Megami no Senshi ~Pegasus Forever~" from Saint Seiya: Hades saga
- "Hana no Kusari" from Saint Seiya: The Lost Canvas
- "Asu e no Toushi" from Ring ni Kakero
- "Niji no Kanata" from Ring ni Kakero: Sekai Taikai Hen
- "Ashita e no Toushi: Flap Your Wings" from Ring ni Kakero: Shadow
- "Strike Anywhere: Chikai no Toki" from Ring ni Kakero: Nichibei Kessen Hen
- "Shining Like Gold: Omoide no Kakera" from Ring ni Kakero: Nichibei Kessen Hen
