= Planck Stars =

Japanese idol girl group

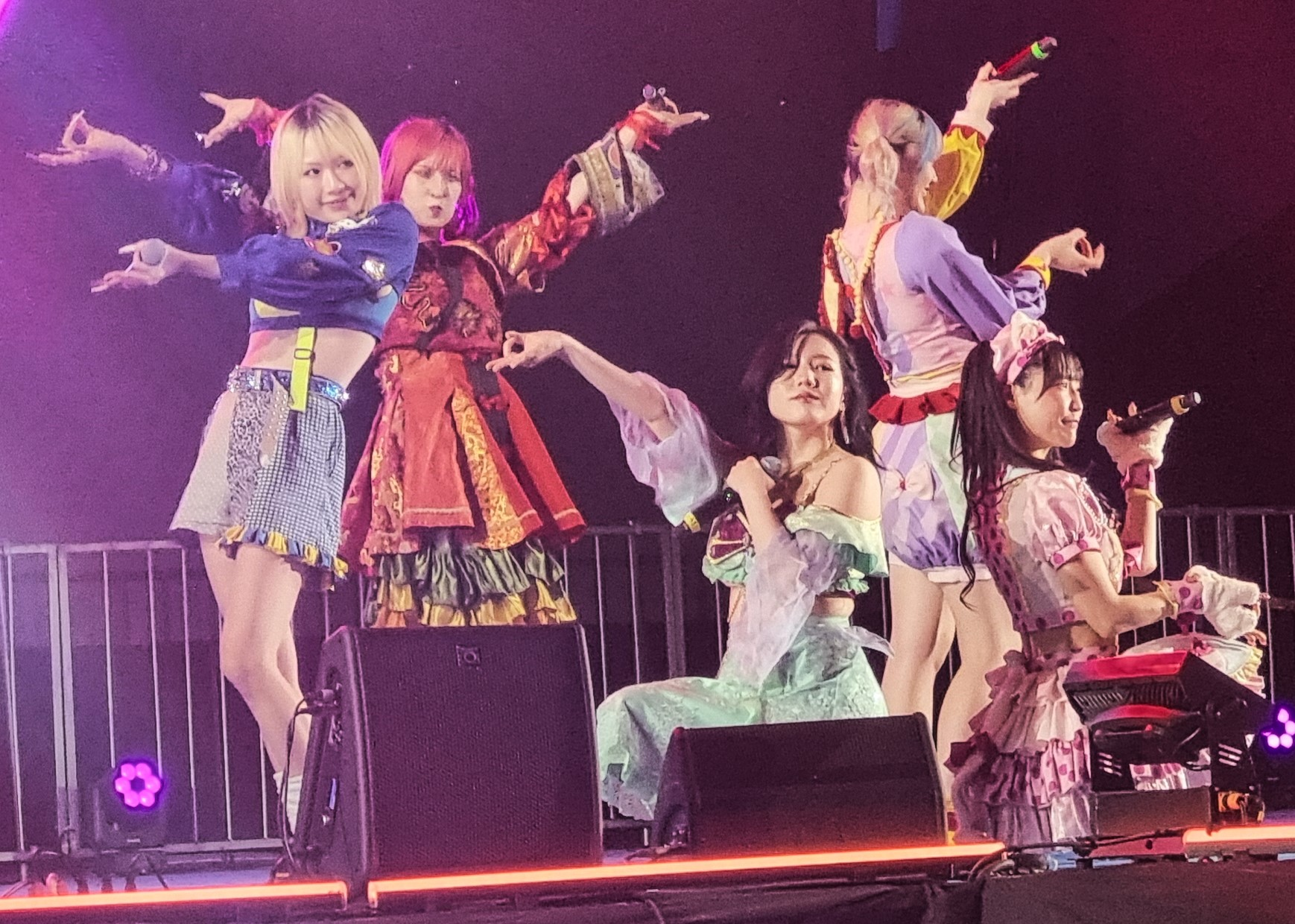
- Planck Stars at Anime Summit 2024 in Brasília, Brazil

Background information
- Origin: Hiroshima, Japan (2018-2025) Tokyo, Japan (2025-2026)
- Genres: J-pop, EDM
- Years active: 2018–2026
- Labels: Warugaki Records; YABACUBE INC
- Members: Anaru Rairai; Buliyama Bulico; Candy Vivid Paradise; Tamayura Iori
- Past members: Karei pan Yotsuba; Hebina Erika; Mana Tissue Fold; Tanaka Iroha; Sumi Tan; Hikicomo Ricca; uyu; Emma Chacha; Seibo Marina; Kisaragi U Frederica; Koharu Nushi; Majikami☆Kanna; Momoshikiya Furukinokibano Shinobunimo Naoamariaru Mukashinarikeri; Raichi; Matsuri; Hanyu Yuka; Touka
- Website: https://planckstars.jimdofree.com/

Planck Stars (プランクスターズ), stylized as PLANCK STARS, is a Japanese idol girl group, originally from Hiroshima, but relocated to Tokyo in October 2025. They made their debut in 2018 and reached mainstream success in 2021. As of September 29, 2026 [refresh], they are on hiatus due to problematic behavior; a successor group named Prankclean Stars, featuring the same members, has taken their place.

Their music is a mix of Rock and electronic dance music.

The concept behind them is described as "free-spirited delinquents." The name sounds like "pranksters", which describes many controversies in which the group has been involved. Their antics have ranged from a member exiting the stage mid-song to buy a churro (and not returning until the very end of the concert), to releasing 300 live crickets in the audience. Members have also hammered the ceiling of a venue; slept on stage; stepped on a fan; thrown ink and soy sauce at the audience; spit watermelon seeds into a fan's mouth; and made a fan drink detergent.

The concept was born from a desire to go against Japanese idol girl groups culture, who tend to face a lot of boundaries on who they can be and how they must act in public. Members perform wearing extravagant clothing, sing foulmouthed lyrics, and even had a monkey and a dog as official members.

== History ==
One of their most famous pranks happened in 2022, when they held a competition to see which member could sell more tickets to a concert, with the winner getting a bike and the one who sold the least tickets having to make an "AV", which many assumed to stand for "adult video". However, the member who had to star in the video was Puri-chan, the dog, who obviously didn't sell a single ticket. Puri-chan then starred in a video playing in a park, an "Animal Video".

In 2022, they released their first mini-album, called Ochi Omega Rema, which reached the 1st place on the Oricon Albums Chart.

They have toured in countries like Thailand, United States, England, Taiwan and South Korea. They have made songs inspired by these places.

In 2024, they performed in Brazil for the first time at Anime Summit, in Brasília.

The group disbanded on February 9, 2025, but announced their reformation in July.

The group, consisting of former members Anaru Rairai and Candy Vivid Paradise along with Nagisa Jun as a candidate, had a guerilla performance on November 23, 2025.

A new line-up debuted on December 24, 2025, along with a system of candidates (i.e. trainees who could be promoted to official members).

On February 8, 2025, while performing at the Sapporo Snow Festival, the group generated controversy when member Anaru Rairai stripped to a swimsuit in frigid weather, leading to an apology from the group on their X account. However, promotional posters onward have included photos of Rairai during the Sapporo Snow Festival.

On May 16, 2026, the group apologized for causing controversy and suspended activities, rebranding as Prankclean Stars and retiring the candidate system.

== Members ==
- All members have stage names, which are:
- Anaru Rairai
- Candy Vivid Paradise
- Buliyama Bulico (formerly known as Chan Richan)
- Tamayura Iori

=== Former ===
==== Official ====
- Karei pan Yotsuba
- Hebina Erika
- Mana Tissue Fold
- Tanaka Iroha (left the group citing it to be "psychologically impossible to continue")
- Sumi Tan
- Hikicomo Ricca
- uyu
- Emma Chacha
- Seibo Marina
- Kisaragi U Frederica
- Koharu Nushi
- Majikami☆Kanna
- Momoshikiya Furukinokibano Shinobunimo Naoamariaru Mukashinarikeri

==== Candidates ====
- Raichi
- Matsuri
- Hanyu Yuka
- Touka
