= Hiroaki "Tommy" Tominaga =

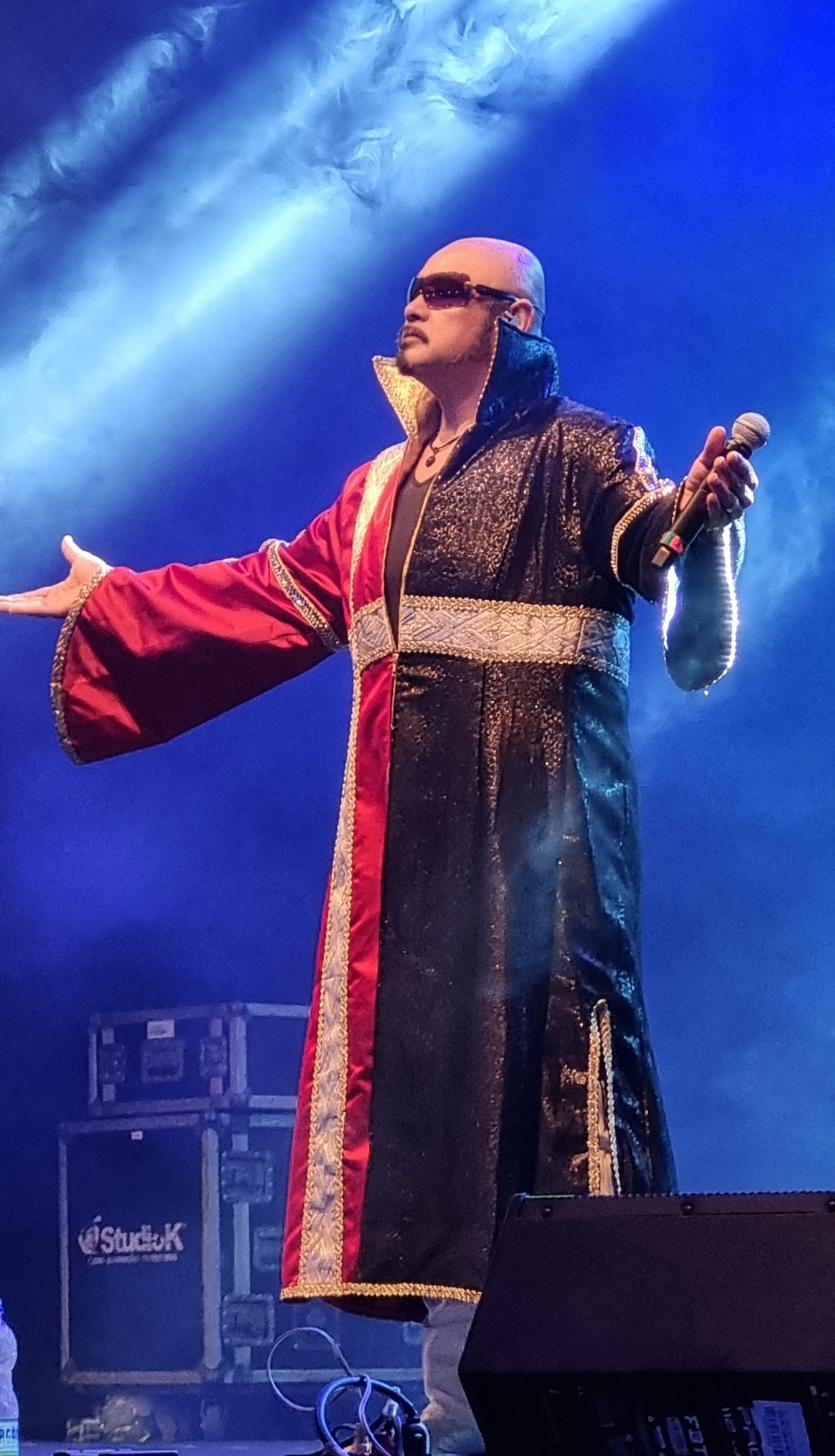
- TOMMY at Anime Summit Teaser in Brasília in 2024

Background information
- Also known as: TOMMY
- Born: Tominaga Hiroaki (富永弘明); December 11, 1964 (age 61); Hitachiota, Japan
- Genres: Anison; hard rock; Funk; J-pop
- Occupations: Musician; singer
- Instrument: Vocals
- Member of: BLUFF; Softsoul
- Website: tommyzoh.starfree.jp/tommyhp05_002.htm

Hiroaki Tominaga, also known as TOMMY, is a Japanese singer. He was born on December 11, 1964, in Hitachiota.

While studying at college, he made regular appearances on the travel documentary TV program Chikyū Kyacchi Mī (lit. 'world catch me'), alongside performing as a singer.

In 1998 Tominaga formed the band BETCHIN with M.c.A.T under the Avex record label. The group released two albums and six singles. He is a member of the rock band BLUFF, which formed in 2007.

Tominaga is best known for singing "JoJo (Sono Chi no Sadame)", the first opening of the anime JoJo's Bizarre Adventure. He formed the group JO☆STARS with two other singers who performed openings for the show. The trio recorded the anime opening "JoJo Sono Chi no Kioku ~end of THE WORLD~" for JoJo's Bizarre Adventure: Stardust Crusaders.

Tominaga also performed the opening of Yu-Gi-Oh! Vrains, "With the Wind".

In 2024, he performed in Brazil for the first time at fan conventions in three cities: in Fortaleza, at SANA, in Recife, at Super-Con, and in Brasília, at Anime Summit Teaser.

== Discography ==
=== Albums ===
- Hiroaki "Tommy" Tominaga (compilation album)

=== Anime openings ===
- JoJo (Sono Chi no Sadame), from JoJo's Bizarre Adventure
- JoJo Sono Chi no Kioku ~end of THE WORLD~, from JoJo's Bizarre Adventure: Stardust Crusaders (as part of JO☆STARS)
- Great Days (Units ver.), from JoJo's Bizarre Adventure: Diamond Is Unbreakable
- With the Wind, from Yu-Gi-Oh! Vrains
- Jinsei wa Party (Kanzen Ban), from Whispered Words.
