= Martian Successor Nadesico =

1996 science fiction anime television series

- 機動戦艦ナデシコ
- Genre: Comedy; Mecha; Space opera
- Directed by: Tatsuo Sato
- Music by: Takayuki Hattori
- Country of origin: Japan
- Original language: Japanese
- No. of episodes: 26 (list of episodes)

Production
- Producers: Noriko Kobayashi (TV Tokyo); Naoya Nakazawa (TV Tokyo); Shinichi Ikeda (Yomiko); Tōru Satō (Xebec)
- Production companies: TV Tokyo; Yomiko Advertising; Xebec

Original release
- Network: TXN (TV Tokyo)
- Release: October 1, 1996 – March 24, 1997

Related
- Manga
- Written by: Kia Asamiya
- Published by: Kadokawa Shoten
- English publisher: AUS: Madman Entertainment; NA: CPM Manga
- Magazine: Shōnen Ace
- Original run: July 26, 1996 – December 26, 1998
- Volumes: 4
- Related
- Prince of Darkness; Gekiganger III

Martian Successor Nadesico (Japanese: 機動戦艦ナデシコ, Hepburn: Kidō Senkan Nadeshiko; lit. "Mobile Battleship Nadesico"), sometimes referred to as simply Nadesico (ナデシコ, Nadeshiko), is a 1996 science fiction comedy anime television series produced by Xebec and directed by Tatsuo Sato, with manga artist Kia Asamiya providing original character designs, Keiji Gotoh serving as chief animation director, Mika Akitaka being the main mechanical designer and Takayuki Hattori composing the music. A manga adaptation by Asamiya was published by Kadokawa Shoten from July 26, 1996, to December 26, 1998, before the premiere of the anime. The manga, licensed in North America by CPM Manga, has many significant changes from the anime.

The series aired from October 1, 1996, to March 24, 1997, with a total of 26 episodes, and was replaced by the Pokémon anime in its timeslot.

In 2005, Anime News Network reported that plans for Nadesico 2 were scrapped, citing an entry on Stellvia director Tatsuo Sato's blog.

== Plot ==
The series takes place in the year 2196. Earth is at war with a race of alien invaders called the "Jovian Lizards". A company called Nergal Heavy Industries designs a space battleship, the ND-001 Nadesico. While the ship is powerful and its crew consists of the top civilian experts in their fields, these individuals tend to have "some slight personality disorders".

The primary protagonist, Akito Tenkawa, is a boy with a mysterious past; once a resident of Mars' Utopia colony, he escaped its destruction by the Jovian Lizards and arrived on Earth, with no memory of how he got there but a terrible fear of the invaders. He hates fighting and only wants to be a chef. However, he is constantly called on to act as a pilot of one of the Nadesico's Aestivalis - humanoid combat robots. While on board the Nadesico, Akito has more problems to deal with than just the Jovians; nearly all the female members of the crew, especially the vessel's captain Yurika Misumaru, seem to be head over heels in love with him, though all he wants to do is cook and watch his favorite anime, Gekiganger III.

== Production ==
The series features an energetic juxtaposition of comedy and drama, as the characters engage in lighthearted antics in between facing the drama of war. Many of the characters are themselves anime fans, and there is often comparison between the campy, sanitized war of the anime within an anime Gekigangar III and the much harsher reality that the crew of the Nadesico faces. The show intentionally includes a number of science fiction anime clichés, including time travel and alien invaders, but turns these concepts on their heads by the end of the series through a number of plot twists. All of this takes place within the grand framework of a space opera.

There are numerous self-referential anime references, particularly to the series Space Battleship Yamato (the name Nadesico is a play on the phrase "Yamato nadeshiko", which represents the traditional Japanese ideal of femininity, and also the name of a flower). E.g. one of the characters was a voice actress before joining the crew (and in fact is a parody of a specific voice actress, Megumi Hayashibara), another is a fangirl who likes to draw her own shōnen-ai doujinshi, and a third is an otaku who bases his entire life on Gekigangar III.

Furthermore, in an episode late in the series the crew holds an anime convention complete with a viewing marathon of Gekigangar, cosplay, and even tie-in merchandising, in effect becoming their own fandom.) Another episode specifically parodies Macross—the crew holds a Miss Nadesico contest to decide on a new titular captain and figurehead in which all of the female crew members participate. The beauty contest includes a swimsuit competition and singing.

The in-universe Gekigangar anime itself is an homage to (and parody of) many super robot mecha anime of the 1970s and 1980s, most particularly the Go Nagai/Ken Ishikawa collaboration Getter Robo. The battles between Earth and planetary colonies featured throughout the show is a reference to Gundam, while the assortment of odd-ball characters on the ship who prefer to choose their own battles, rather than take sides, is a nod to Harlock. Additionally, writers from previous popular science fiction mecha shows occasionally get announced in teasers for various episodes of Nadesico.

== Media ==
=== Anime ===
The Martian Successor Nadesico anime was directed by Tatsuo Sato and produced by TV Tokyo, Xebec, and Yomiko Advertising, Inc. The series aired on TV Tokyo from October 1, 1996, to March 24, 1997. ADV Films announced they had licensed Martian Successor Nadesico in May 1998 at Project A-Kon 9; the company released the series originally on 12 VHS tapes. Later, the series was released on a total of six DVDs. On September 24, 2002, ADV Films released a box set containing all of the DVDs entitled Martian Successor Nadesico: Complete Chronicles. Three episodes aired on Cartoon Network's anime block Toonami for "Giant Robot Week", which ran on February 24-28, 2003. On January 1, 2008, a collection of all the episodes entitled Martian Successor Nadesico: Perfect Collection. At Anime Expo 2011, Nozomi Entertainment announced that they had re-licensed the series, following ADV's closure in 2009. They re-released the series, along with the movie and the Gekiganger III OVA, in 2012. Anime Limited later acquired the series in 2017 on Blu-ray.

Martian Successor Nadesico's opening song is "You Get to Burning" by Yumi Matsuzawa. The main ending song is "Watashi Rashiku" (私らしく; "Being Myself") by Houko Kuwashima, with episode 26 featuring "Itsuka...Shinjite" (いつか…信じて; "I Believe... Someday") by Kazumi Matsumura as its ending.

=== Manga ===
A manga series loosely based on the anime with a whole new story line and written for a mature audience.

=== OVA ===
A Gekigangar III compilation OVA was also released.

=== Movie ===
A sequel movie called The Prince of Darkness is a 1998 anime film written and directed by Tatsuo Sato. The story is a direct sequel to Nadesico: The Blank of Three Years, a video game for the Sega Saturn that takes place immediately after the TV series ends, and before the movie begins.

=== Video games ===
Four games based on the series were released in Japan. The first game, released for the Sega Saturn in 1997, is entitled Mobile Battleship Nadesico. It is a dating sim game with a few mecha elements included. A second game, also for the Sega Saturn, was released in the following year under the title Martian Successor Nadesico: The Blank of Three Years. It is an interactive story of the events which occurred in between the television series and the movie. Released on the Dreamcast in 1999, Martian Successor Nadesico: The Mission, continues the story from Prince of Darkness. Finally, a mahjong variant game was released for the Game Boy Color entitled Mobile Battleship Nadesico: Ruriruri Mahjong. Nadesico also appears in games in the Super Robot Wars and Another Century's series, where the setting is combined with other mecha series' such as Gundam, Mazinger, Full Metal Panic!, and Tekkaman Blade.

In 2026, a fan translation of the game "Martian Successor Nadesico: The Blank of Three Years" is available in English, 28 years after the game's release.

== Reception ==
There have been mixed reviews to the series, although most reviews have been positive. One review written when the series was released on DVD gave it average ratings, commenting that while the show was dubbed into English poorly, it commented positively on the use of characters saying, "Despite his heroic calling as a robot pilot, Akito is remarkably approachable—after all, what could be more down-to-earth than a cook? Yurika, the world's most unlikely starship captain, may seem like a troublesome ditz at first, but demonstrates resolve and emotional depth as she learns the art of leadership. The characters may be billed as goofballs, but they also provide some of the most touching moments in the show. The Nadesico mindset shows that heroism and self-sacrifice are still respectable virtues, and that nobody needs to hear whining about why you can't or won't pilot a giant robot." Los Angeles Times writer Charles Solomon praised the series, calling its action and hi-jinks on par with Rocky and Bullwinkle.

Other reviews have been generally positive, with one saying, "Nadesico is one of those rare series that has something for everyone. Comedy, action, romance, drama...you name it, this series has it (well, almost). What's even more astonishing is that Nadesico keeps everything tied together in a neat little coherent package, so much so that you'll hardly even notice the blend of genres. It's a pretty cool little package, too." Another review praised the English dub, saying "I first watched this show multiple times in Japanese, but eventually gave the English dub a try and found I loved it. The cast is excellent, with Jennifer Earhart's Yurika being especially noteworthy. Even minor characters, such as a Jovian pilot played by Jason Douglas, give great performances. His reading of 'If only the humans appreciated life as we do, I would not have to kill so many of them' is brilliant."

The series quickly became popular. The film won the Animage Grand Prix award in 1998. In other polls conducted by Animage in the same year, Akito was voted the ninth most "Favorite Male Character of the Year", Ruri Hoshino was voted second and Yurika eighth most "Favorite Female Characters of the Year" and the TV series was vote the third "Favorite Anime of the Year".
