= List of Martian Successor Nadesico characters =

The following is a list of characters from the Japanese manga and anime Martian Successor Nadesico. Character names are listed in Western order, with the given names preceding the surnames.

== Nadesico crewmembers ==
Akito Tenkawa (天河 明人, Tenkawa Akito)
Voiced by: Yūji Ueda (Japanese); Spike Spencer (English)
Born on Mars and orphaned after his parents died in an apparent military coup, Akito's dream to become a cook stemmed from the quality of the raw food available. Though he has a nanomachine controller enabling him to pilot machinery, he refused to become a military pilot; his first time in an Aestevalis, a humanoid combat robot, was an accident, though he quickly showed capable piloting skill. Due to the lack of pilots on the Nadesico, Akito was officially made one for the duration of the tour of duty. A fan of the anime Gekiganger, his devotion to the series is rekindled by fellow pilot Gai Daigoji. Akito is romantically adored by nearly all the girls aboard the Nadesico, especially the ship's captain Yurika Misumaru, who he later proposes to and marries.
Yurika Misumaru (御統 ユリカ, Misumaru Yurika)
Voiced by: Houko Kuwashima (Japanese); Jennifer K. Earhart (English)
Yurika is the beautiful but ditzy captain of the Nadesico and childhood friend of Akito Tenkawa. Though he considers her crazy, Yurika has romantic feelings for him, and the two later get married. Yurika is shown to be very scatterbrained at times, misinterpreting comments made by others as words of inspiration and devotion, and forgetting or twisting events from her and Akito's childhood. Nonetheless, she is a very capable captain, and a constant source of cheerfulness and inspiration for the rest of the crew.
Ruri Hoshino (星野 ルリ, Hoshino Ruri)
Voiced by: Omi Minami (Japanese); Kira Vincent-Davis (English)
The "Electronic Fairy", she keeps the ship's computer (Omoikane) running and slowly bonds with it, asking it numerous questions about society and human interaction. Ruri is depicted as the youngest member of staff on board the Nadesico, the space battleship that the series revolves around. Despite this, she is often portrayed as being more intelligent than the rest of crew, and seen as something of a "child prodigy". Ruri is often shown disparaging the inane antics of her older co-workers, usually by use of her catchphrase "bunch of fools" (バカばっか, baka bakka). According to her backstory, Ruri has a special affinity with computers due to genetic engineering, something that also affects her attitude towards others. She is occasionally referred to as "Ruriruri" by fellow bridge crewman Minato and Aestivalis pilot Hikaru.
According to Keiji Gotoh, the movie version of Ruri was the easiest character he ever designed, her concept "popping into his head right away". Dan Kanemitsu, the English translator for Martian Successor Nadesico, notes that Ruri's phrase of "baka bakka" was one of the hardest lines in the show to translate from its original Japanese form. The character of Ruri was unexpectedly a favourite, and became popular among fans as a depiction of the moe ideal. Because of Ruri's quiet, serious character and dead-pan expressions, she is often compared to Rei Ayanami from Neon Genesis Evangelion. Hiroki Azuma believes Ruri to be directly influenced by Rei.
In the manga, Ruri is full captain of the Nadesico. She seems not much different but she is given almost all the attention rather than just half. The mirror copy of her is the same and acts completely the same along with the fact that she is also captain of her ship. Both Ruris seem to also have an internal problem and cough up blood when under extreme stress.
Gai Daigoji
Voiced by: Tomokazu Seki (Japanese); Brett Weaver (English)
Born Jiro Yamada (an average name, similar to John Doe or John Smith in English), he insisted that Gai Daigoji was "the name that belongs to (his) soul", and angrily asserted his "true" name whenever someone used the "other" one. A rabid Gekiganger otaku, he was an official pilot and arrived three days ahead of schedule when he learned they would be piloting actual robots like in the anime. Fueled by his devotion to the show, Gai had a fierce intensity in and out of battle, and was angry and resentful towards Akito for being the first one to engage the enemy, stealing "(his) destiny", even though he had a broken leg and was unable to fight. The two were soon able to bond over Gekiganger, although Gai could not understand why Akito would rather be "a dumb cook" than a robot pilot. Although it was Gai's wish to die heroically in battle like one of the characters, he was unceremoniously shot and killed during an escape of prisoners held aboard the Nadesico; Akito took his death very hard, and devoted himself to Gai and the ideals of Gekiganger. In the Super Robot Wars series of video games, the player can save Gai by fulfilling certain conditions, and in Super Robot Wars W, he lives as part of the game's default story, to the point of even having a game exclusive timeskip transition for both him and his Aestevalis Custom so as to fit him into the Nadesico movie's plot.
Megumi Reinard
Voiced by: Naoko Takano (Japanese); Jenny Strader (English)
Megumi Reinard is a former voice actress who did work for anime and animated commercials. She is recruited by Nergal to be the communications officer aboard the Nadesico. Megumi has no love for war and killing in general. This is why she has a lot in common with Akito Tenkawa, who only wants to be a cook, not a pilot/soldier. She is also Yurika Misumaru's main competition for Akito's affection, though she is not really worried since the captain is oblivious to just about everything. Megumi is the first to officially be classified as Akito's girlfriend, beginning around episode 4.
Jun Aoi
Voiced by: Kentarō Itō (Japanese); Mark X. Laskowski (English)
The first officer of the Nadesico, Jun has no small infatuation for Yurika, leaving a position in the Earth's military to join her crew and "look out for her". She is clueless of how he feels and considers him her "best friend", though the rest of the crew realize his feelings. A common running gag is Jun's misunderstanding of Yurika's special efforts, such as preparing food—he believes it is for him, but it always ends up being for Akito, with him being passed by. He has crush on Yurika.
Inez Fressange
Voiced by: Naoko Matsui (Japanese); Heather Bryson (English)
Developed the Nadesico's Phase Transition system for Nergal on Mars before it was invaded; when the ship returned to the planet, she came aboard, stating that the surviving colonists refused to leave, believing the ship would soon be destroyed; however, an attack immediately afterwards forced the grounded Nadesico to raise its shields, crushing the underground colonists and leaving her the only survivor. She hosts the "Naze Nani Nadesico" segment as a technical consultant along with Ruri and Yurika in an attempt to teach the crew about the ship's workings, as a way of atoning for what happened. Her name comes from real-life French model Inès de La Fressange's name.
Ryoko Subaru
Voiced by: Chisa Yokoyama (Japanese); Tiffany Grant (English)
Aestivalis pilot and, she escaped from the L2 space colony when it was destroyed by the Jovians, salvaging four Aestevalis suits and fellow pilot Izumi Maki. The most fiery and combative of the three, but a surprise attack from the enemy left her terrified and crying out for help from Akito; this was noted and would be mercilessly brought up by Izumi and Hikaru many times, to her great embarrassment. Over time, she began to accept her feelings for Akito, but for the most part refrained from public displays of affection.
Izumi Maki
Voiced by: Miki Nagasawa (Japanese); Tamara Lo (English)
Aestivalis pilot, brought in a storage container from the L2 colony by Ryoko. Quiet and reserved, though an incurable punster, cracking up at her own jokes. In the later episodes she reveals she had two fiancees, both of whom died. One of disease, one of an accident.
Hikaru Amano
Voiced by: Shiho Kikuchi (Japanese); Cynthia Martinez (English)
Aestivalis pilot and rabid Gekigangar III fangirl, she was ejected from the L2 colony in a capsule which crashed into the Nadesico; making her way through the air ducts, she was directly over Akito's room as he was watching a tragic episode of Gekiganger. Moved to tears, her wailing could be heard through the overhead vent, right before she fell out of it and onto him. She is a rabid Gekigangar III fan and one day wants to publish her own manga about the series with herself as the lead female, and two of the male leads in a shōnen-ai relationship. During Martian Successor Nadesico: The Prince of Darkness it is shown that Hikaru becomes an actual manga artist, but is overstressed due to her profession.
Nagare Akatsuki
Voiced by: Ryōtarō Okiayu (Japanese); Jay Hickman (English)
Nagare came into the picture after the Nadesico escaped from Mars; a skilled Aestivalis pilot, Nagare rescued Akito during battle as the latter was in a state of panic and unable to move. He was soon assigned to the Nadesico, bringing along Erina Won, who he had a mysterious relationship with. Nagare disparaged Akito for his devotion to the simplistic ideals of Gekiganger and the fact that he hates Japanese Anime altogether, but the two were still able to get along well enough.
Minato Haruka
Voiced by: Maya Okamoto (Japanese); Kelly Manison (English)
The main helmswoman for the Nadesico. She gave up her job as the secretary for a large company's president so she could join the Nadesico crew. Her reason being that it sounded much more interesting. She has a mixed-up relationship with Goat Hoary. She helps Tsukomo and falls in love with him after a fight with Goat that ended their relationship.
Erina Kinjo Won
Voiced by: Yūko Nagashima (Japanese); Emily Carter-Essex (English)
Erina joins the Nadesico at the same time as Nagare and proves to be just as irritating to the other characters. Her official post is co-helmswoman, but she ends up pushing orders onto everyone around and even the captain. She has a great fascination with Akito because of his boson jumping abilities and constantly confronts him to become an experiment guinea pig. In episode 22, she seems to cry when Akito leaves which may hint at her feelings for him also.
Mr. Prospector
Voiced by: Kenichi Ono (Japanese); Paul Sidello (English)
Mr. Prospector's real name is never revealed, but he seems to not only be some sort of Nergal accountant, but the recruitment officer for the Nadesico. He is most known for agonizing over the loss of expensive equipment.
Seiya Uribatake
Voiced by: Nobuo Tobita (Japanese); John Swasey (English)
Ace mechanic Seiya joins the Nadesico to get away from his wife and child, at the same time chasing around various young women. Most noticeable among them is Hikaru, who he almost has a relationship with.
Goat Hoary
Voiced by: Juurouta Kosugi (Japanese); Rob Mungle (English)
A serious man of few words, Goat seems to be the crew's guardian. He also has a relationship with Minato Haruka for a time. He is very big and very strong, capable of carrying Megumi and Ruri, one on each arm, and is a skilled marksman.
Howmei
Voiced by: Miyuki Ichijo (Japanese); Marcy Rae (English)
Head chef on the Nadesico, Howmei is responsible for making sure everything gets cooked correctly, even if it involves teaching Akito about the variety of spices and flavourings available on Earth. Given the very nature of the Nadesico's mission... and the fact that some of them might not live to see another day, Howmei want to make sure that every meal the crew eats is as good as they want... because it may be their last meal.
Howmei Girls
Voiced by: Tomoko Kawakami (Japanese); Anna Bechtol (TV), Junie Hoang (movie) (English)
A group of girls who are Howmei's main cooking crew. They are often seen together either cooking or singing. In the movie they went to work at an amusement park. They are Sayuri Terasaki, the tallest one who wears her black hair in a ponytail. Sayuri Terasaki is voiced by Akiko Yajima in Japanese and Kimberly Yates and Meredith J. Dahl (TV) and Jessica Boone (movie) in English. Junko Mizuhara, she has short blue hair. Junko Mizuhara is voiced by Yumi Matsuzawa (TV) and Yuka Imai (movie) in Japanese and Ekanem Ebinne in English. Mikako Satou, the shortest one who wears her brunette hair in two low buns. Mikako Satou is voiced by Emi Motoi in Japanese and Monica Rial in English. Harumi Tanaka, she has red hair worn in two braids. Harumi Tanaka is voiced by Akira Nakagawa in Japanese and Kelli Cousins in English. Eri Uemura, she has brown hair tied in a ponytail.
Itsuki Kazama
Voiced by: Houko Kuwashima (Japanese); Kelli Cousins (English)
Itsuki came on as a replacement pilot when Akito left the ship with Megumi during the Christmas return of the Nadesico to Earth. She is known as a great team player and an excellent pilot, but was killed in her first battle with the team. During production, she was unnamed, so she was referred to in-series as "Newbie" and "Seelie" (by Ryoko both times). She was originally named Sayuri Terasaki, but this name was retconned by her appearance as one of the lead characters in the Blank of Three Years video game.
Aqua Crimson
Voiced by: Yūko Mizutani (Japanese); Hilary Haag (English)
The rich daughter of the Crimson family, Aqua appears briefly for one episode, as an analogue to Aquamarine: a character from Gekiganger III. Much like her namesake, she initially appears as a caring, beautiful, and respectful teen, only to later be shown as somewhat of a psycho, wanting to die along with Akito. She believes that by doing so, she will escape from her rich and boring lifestyle, and become a tragic heroine. Aqua also seems to be a remarkable cook, though it is implied that she always includes in her food a powerful paralyzing drug, making this point somewhat moot.

== Jovians ==
Tsukumo Shiratori
Voiced by: Tomokazu Seki (Japanese); Brett Weaver (English)
Tsukumo is a commander of the Superior Jovian Male Forces and a mecha pilot. He is similar in appearance and personality to Gai Daigoji, and ultimately dies in the same way. In the video game Super Robot Wars W for the Nintendo DS, he survives his assassination after Gai, with whom he had developed a comrade-in-arms relationship with, took a bullet meant for him. During the six-month time period between the halves of the story, he marries Minato, ends up helping Kaname Chidori and her friends deal with the "Poniman" incident when things get far out of hand (in one version of the mission, he makes things worse, getting into a battle with Sousuke Sagara, another character voiced by Tomokazu), and participates in the events of the Prince of Darkness storyline.
Yukina Shiratori
Voiced by: Ikue Ohtani (Japanese); Hilary Haag (English)
Yukina is Tsukumo's younger sister, and is horrified to find out that her older brother has fallen in love with an earth woman (Minato). She promptly leaves for the Nadesico to assassinate the woman in question, but after meeting her, she realizes Minato is a very nice woman and understands why her brother fell in love with her. When her brother is murdered, Minato becomes her only family. Within the next few years, Minato becomes like a mother to Yukina. She often bullies Jun, but it seems because she has crush on him.
Gen-Ichiro Tsukuomi
Voiced by: Toshiyuki Morikawa (Japanese); Jason Douglas (English)
Tsukumo Shiratori's best friend and comrade in battle and off the field, however later jealousy forms within him for abandoning their Gekigangar III ideal of woman hood Mrs Nanako; Tsukumo still leaves despite Gen-Ichiro's protests. Later on Gen-Ichiro, believing Tsukumo had defected to the Earth Alliance's side and under special orders from Vice Admiral Haruki Kusakabe, has Tsukumo shot to stop him from defending the Earth and plans to conquer Earth and Mars. Although later on during the series Gen-Ichiro has some slight doubts about where he should be and in the movie Martian Successor Nadesico: Prince of Darkness, Gen-Ichiro now works for Nergal in an attempt to stop his former commander and the Martian Successors.
