= Anime Summit =

Japanese pop culture convention in Brasília, Brazil

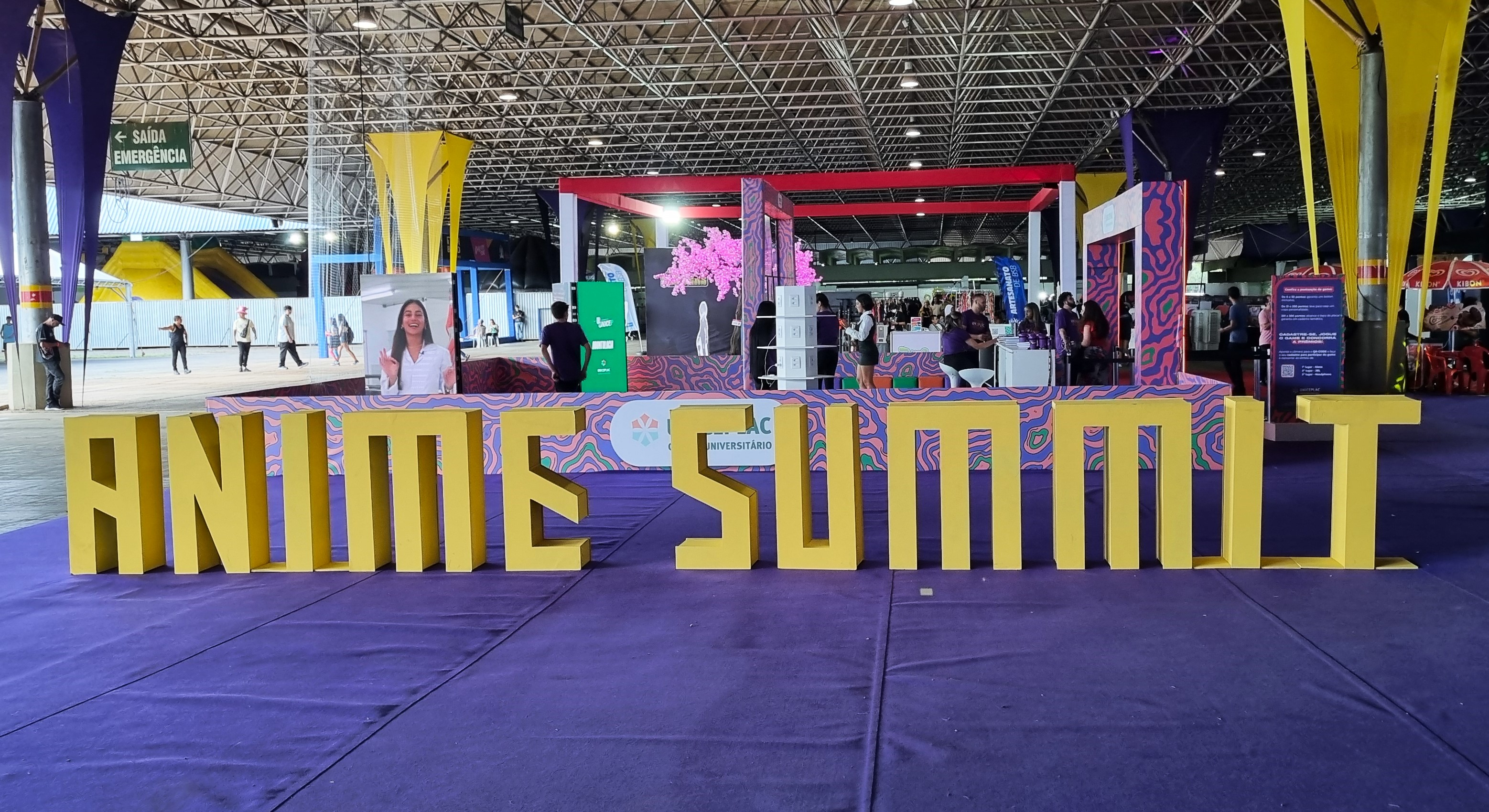
- Anime Summit logo at the 2024 edition

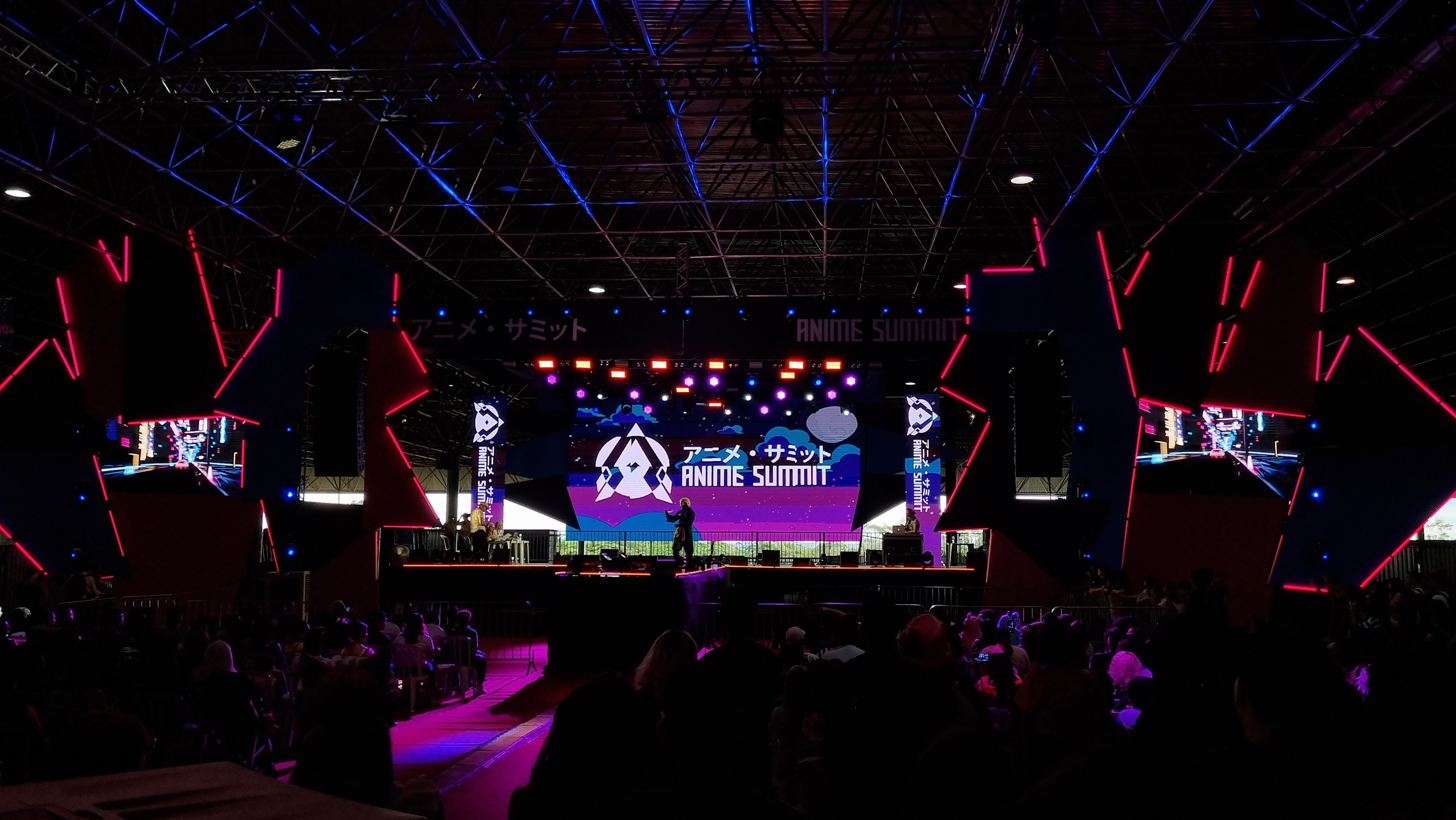
- Anime Summit main stage for the 2024 edition
- Status: Active
- Genre: Anime, East Asian popular culture
- Venue: Pavilhão de Exposições do Parque da Cidade
- Location: Brasília
- Country: Brazil
- Inaugurated: May 27, 2022; 4 years ago
- Organizer: FEANBRA
- Website: https://lnk.bio/AnimeSummit

Anime Summit is an anime convention that takes place in Brasília, Brazil. The event tends to bring Japanese artists in its several iterations.

There is usually a space for artists to show and sell their products, usually known as Artist's Alley. Voice actors are regular guests in the convention, which also has workshops, cosplay contests, Eastern cuisine and many stores selling products related to Japanese pop culture.

In its second year, the organization announced two other events, one called Anime Summit Chibi, a smaller version of the main event; as well as Anime Summit Teaser, which serves as an appetizer for the main event, which usually happens in the middle of the year.

== Event history ==
Title	Dates	Venue	Attractions
Anime Summit 2022	May 27–29, 2022	Pavilhão de Exposições do Parque da Cidade	Detonator, Gaijin Sentai, Ricardo Cruz, Guilherme Briggs, Wendel Bezerra, Charles Emmanuel, Denilson Félix, Ricardo Nakase, Mayara Stefane, Lucas Almeida, Maverick Hunters, Skullzy, Roxxy Sant'Anna, Diogo Miyahara, Lipe Volpato, Francisco Junior, Carol Valença, Glauco Marques
Anime Summit 2023	June 23–25, 2023	Pavilhão de Exposições do Parque da Cidade	Guilherme Briggs, Manolo Rey, Lipe Volpato, Wendel Bezerra, Luisa Palomanes, Takayoshi Tanimoto, Snowkel, Yumi Matsuzawa, Bianca Alencar, Felipe Grinnan, Úrsula Bezerra, Francisco Junior, Mitsubukai (Glauco Marques, Carol Valença and Adrian Tatini), Robson Kumode, Detonator, Denilson Félix, Mc Maha, Danger3 (Ricardo Cruz, Larissa Tassi and Rodrigo Rossi), Charles Emmanuel, Roxxy Sant'Anna, Léo Stronda
Anime Summit Chibi	December 15–17, 2023	Clube do Congresso	Takumi Tsutsui, Seiko Seno, Rica Matsumoto, Tauz, Mitsubukai (Glauco Marques, Carol Valença and Adrian Tatini), Tati Keplmair, Vanderlan Mendes, Michihiko Suwa, Wendel Bezerra, Léo Stronda, Roxxy Sant'Anna, Fábio Lucindo, Lunia, Diogo Miyahara, Maverick Hunters, Orine Fukushima, Marcelo Robocop, Kerberos
Anime Summit Teaser	February 3 and 4, 2024	Nilson Nelson Gymnasium	Anison Lab (Ricardo Cruz and Lucas Araújo), Burnout Syndromes, Hiroaki "Tommy" Tominaga, Lunia, Maverick Hunters
Anime Summit 2024	April 18–21, 2024	Pavilhão de Exposições do Parque da Cidade	Shouhei Kusaka, MHRap, Hiroki Takahashi, Planck Stars, Yumi Matsuzawa, Marina Del Ray, Hiroshi Watari, Mika Kobayashi, Junko Iwao
