= Harlock =

Harlock is a surname. Notable people with the surname include:

- David Harlock (born 1971), Canadian ice hockey player
- Des Harlock (1922–1981), Welsh footballer
- Kenny Harlock, New Zealand footballer
- Neil Harlock (born 1975), New Zealand footballer
- Captain Harlock, fictional character created by Leiji Matsumoto

Harlock: Space Pirate, film based on the character
