= Tatsuo Sato (director) =

Japanese anime director (1964–2026)

- 佐藤 竜雄
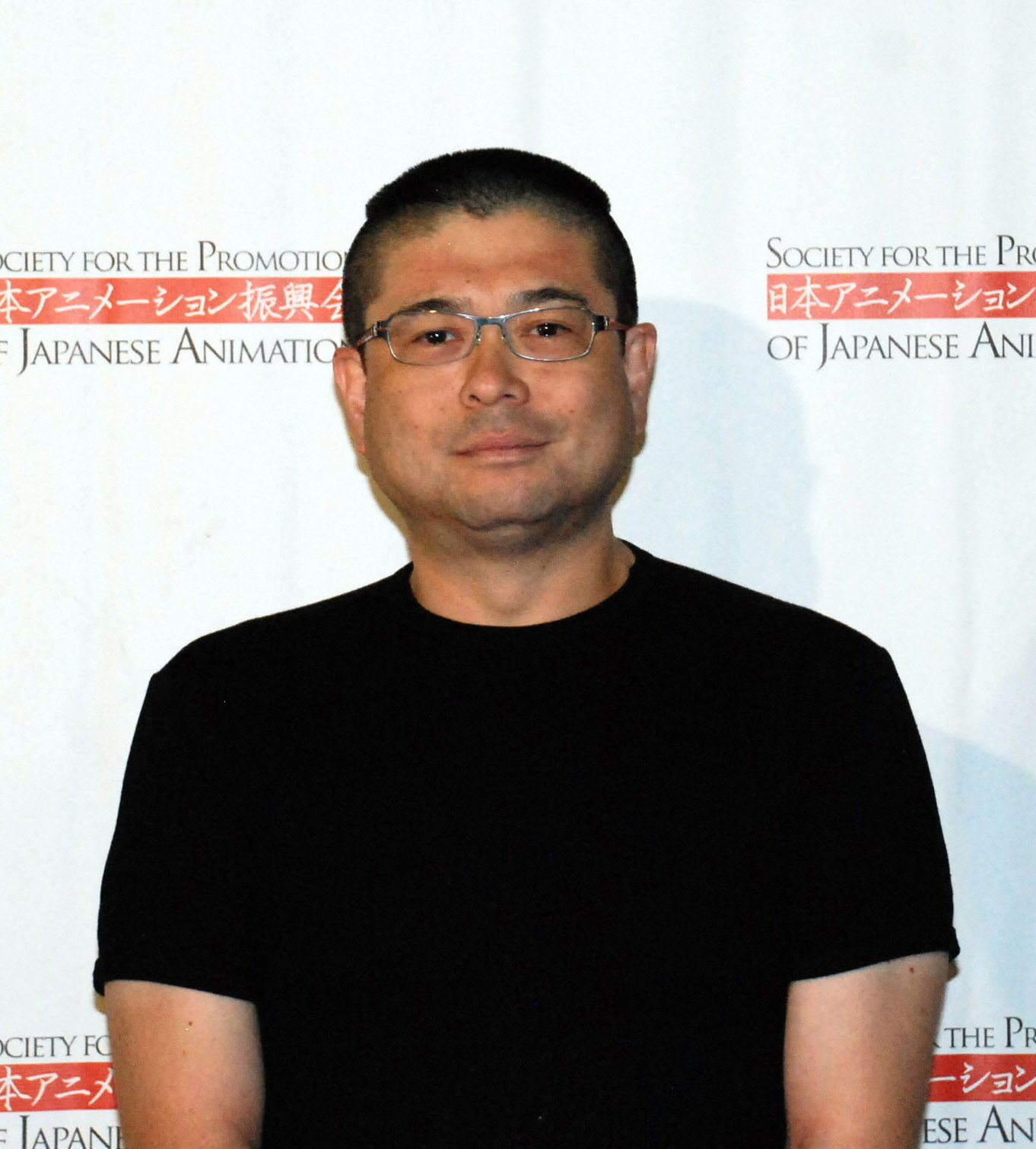
- Sato at Anime Expo in 2012
- Born: July 7, 1964; Ōiso, Kanagawa, Japan
- Died: April 24, 2026 (aged 61)
- Education: Waseda University
- Occupation: Anime director
- Known for: Martian Successor Nadesico

Tatsuo Sato (佐藤 竜雄, Satō Tatsuo; July 7, 1964 – April 24, 2026) was a Japanese anime director most famous for Martian Successor Nadesico. On May 7, 2026, it was announced that Sato died of liver failure on April 24.

== Works (as director) ==
- Soar High! Isami
- Martian Successor Nadesico
- Martian Successor Nadesico: The Motion Picture – Prince of Darkness
- Cat Soup
- Shingu: Secret of the Stellar Wars
- Stellvia
- Ninja Scroll: The Series
- Tokyo Tribe 2
- Shigofumi: Letters from the Departed
- Bodacious Space Pirates
- Lagrange: The Flower of Rin-ne (as chief director)
- Lord Marksman and Vanadis
- Atom: The Beginning
- Yu-Gi-Oh! VRAINS (directing supervision) (episode 14 onwards)
- Helck
- Tasūketsu: Fate of the Majority
- Spirit Circle
