= Stellvia =

Television series

- Cover art of Geneon Entertainment's DVD box set of Stellvia featuring main characters of the series

宇宙のステルヴィア (Uchū no Suteruvia)
- Genre: Mecha, Coming of Age, Romance, Comedy drama
- Anime television series
- Directed by: Tatsuo Satō
- Produced by: Gou Nakanishi; Shinichi Ikeda; Takatoshi Chino
- Written by: Mitsuyasu Sakai; Katsuhiko Koide; Ichirō Ōkouchi; Tatsuo Satō; Katsuhiko Chiba
- Music by: Seikou Nagaoka
- Studio: Xebec
- Licensed by: AUS: Madman Entertainment; NA: Discotek Media
- Original network: TV Tokyo
- Original run: April 2, 2003 – September 24, 2003
- Episodes: 26
- Manga
- Written by: Ryo Akitsuki
- Published by: MediaWorks
- English publisher: NA: Dr. Master
- Magazine: Dengeki Daioh
- Original run: 2003 – 2004
- Volumes: 2

Stellvia (Japanese: 宇宙のステルヴィア, Hepburn: Uchū no Suteruvia), also known as Stellvia of the Universe, is an anime series set in space. As a prelude to the series, the Earth of year 2167 AD is shown to be devastated by a powerful electromagnetic shockwave. This is caused by a nearby star, Hydrus Beta, 20 light-years away, going supernova. As a result, 3 billion of the 14 billion people on Earth were wiped out. The series itself is set 189 years later, in the year 2356 AD. Civilization has been rebuilt with humanity having united together to face the coming of the second shockwave of the supernova. The second shockwave, unlike the first, is to contain a great deal of matter composed of the remnants of the star itself. Stellvia ran for 26 episodes and was produced by the animation studio Xebec. It was distributed in the United States by Geneon. In September 2007 Geneon halted all distribution of anime DVDs in America, including Stellvia. A sequel was originally announced for 2005, but was canceled after internal difficulties.

Beginning with the May 2003 issue, a manga adaptation by Ryo Akizuki was serialized in Dengeki Daioh and has been published in the US as a two volume graphic novel series by DrMaster. The word Stellvia is composed of two Latin words, stella meaning star(s) and via meaning street or road. Therefore, Stellvia is roughly translated as The Road to the Stars.

The series makes references to things such as Theory of knowledge, CAS, and Extended Essay, which suggests that Stellvia might have been partially inspired by the International Baccalaureate program, or at least, included an Ex-IB student in its development.

In 2018, Discotek Media announced that they have rescued the series following Geneon's downfall.

The series opening theme is "Asu e no brilliant road (明日へのbrilliant road)" by angela.

== Plot ==
The series takes place in the year 2356 A.D., around 189 years after a worldwide catastrophe had wiped out 10% of Earth's population. To keep track on all space activities, mankind has built numerous colossal space stations called "foundations" all across the Solar System. After passing the Space Academy's entrance exams, Shima Katase embarks to the Earth-based foundation Stellvia to fulfill her dreams of seeing the galaxy and to prevent any more interstellar catastrophes from destroying Earth, once and for all.

== Characters ==
Shima "Shipon" Katase (片瀬 志麻, Katase Shima)

Voiced by: Ai Nonaka (Japanese); Carrie Savage (English)

The protagonist of the story is Shima (or "Shīpon (しーぽん)" as she is dubbed by Arisa) who joins the Stellvia foundation's space program so that she could "see the stars while looking forward, rather than having to look up". In the beginning, she fluctuates between complete confidence in her abilities and believing she couldn't do anything. The series depicts her as extremely diligent, although she is also a natural genius.
As the series progresses, she learns to understand her mistakes and not think that she has to be perfect or else fail. For instance, after a rocky start to her training, during which she was dead last in her class at piloting, she takes the advice of Kouta Otoyama and realizes she was trying to keep track of far too much information on her ship displays. Her piloting improves dramatically as a result. However, she still will lose her confidence often. Once she is like that she will get into a deep depression like a little kid thinking that it is because she does not have talent. Actually, Shima has a rare talent. Shima is offered to be the 5th member of the Big 4, after passing the test. Despite her early setbacks as a pilot, her programming abilities are top notch from the very start, and she eventually combines the two in order to become even more formidable in the cockpit. She is called Shipon because the first time she piloted one of the Biancas she flew around like a ping-pong ball. She and Kouta develop a romantic relationship (they share their first kiss on episode 12). She likes Kouta very much but somehow gets irritated when he can't understand her. During the genesis mission she was piloting Halcyon (also called Lucyon by Arisa and Rinna). Some irregularities were interrupting the Infinity, so Halcyon released its barrier and absorbed the irregularities. She almost died at that risk. It is shown that she loves Kouta very much by almost sacrificing her life by saving him from the irregularities.
Kouta Otoyama (音山 光太, Otoyama Kōta)

Voiced by: Takahiro Mizushima (Japanese); Johnny Yong Bosch (English)

Kouta is an enigmatic character. He and Shipon develop a romantic relationship (they share their first kiss in episode 12) but there's still a lot about him that remains unknown. He has an older sister who runs an astronomical observatory in Japan. He often gives advice which is as enigmatic as himself.
He consistently achieves rank C in every class, without exception, regardless of how easy or hard the subject is. And when he was warned of the possibility of Ayaka attacking Shipon during training, he displays extraordinary piloting abilities beyond what his ship should have been capable of handling. Another example would be during a simulator-game where Rinna scored Rank A, and Shima scored Rank B, but he scored Rank S. When Shima asks why Kouta does not do the best during class, especially since he is capable of it, he merely says: he wonders why also. Pierre once remarks "Talented hawks hide their talons" when referring to Kouta's skills.
On a different note, James was curious of Kouta's 'vision' and said he was chosen by the universe.
Arisa Glennorth (アリサ・グレンノース, Arisa Gurennōsu)

Voiced by: Yuki Matsuoka (Japanese); Kari Wahlgren (English)

Arisa is Shipon's best friend at the Stellvia foundation. They meet on the shuttle going to the station from Earth at the beginning of the term, and find themselves rooming together and in the same class as well. Though Arisa is nowhere near Shipon in academic or piloting ability, she finds Shipon to be an inspiration to improve herself, and calls Shipon her "Star of Hope". Later in the series, she begins focusing on becoming a mechanic, rather than a pilot.
Rinna Kazamatsuri (風祭 りんな, Kazamatsuri Rin'na)

Voiced by: Ryo Hirohashi (Japanese); Sandy Fox (English)

Rinna is a transfer student from the Ultima foundation, and considers Shipon to be both a friend and chief rival. Rinna is a few years younger than Shipon and most of the other students, but because there are few children at Ultima (it being the newest of the foundations, and still incomplete), she has little to do with herself but play with simulators. As a result, she's far better at piloting and zero-G movement than most people years older than she is.
Yayoi Fujisawa (藤沢 やよい, Fujisawa Yayoi)

Voiced by: Fumiko Orikasa (Japanese); Michelle Ruff (English)

Yayoi is one of the older students in Shipon's class. Yayoi had been in Stellvia's training program 2 years before, but left after a flight training accident. Ayaka Machida attempted to save her, and failed, but it turned out the "accident" was intentionally caused by Ayaka in the first place.
Recognizing the signs of another "accident" when Ayaka took Shipon out to train alone, she warns Kouta of what might be about to happen. Kouta is able to prevent another tragedy.
Despite the attacks on herself and Shipon, Yayoi lies to protect Ayaka when it looked like she might face expulsion from Stellvia.
Akira Kayama (栢山 晶, Kayama Akira)

Voiced by: Rie Tanaka (Japanese); Kate Higgins (English)

Akira is a quiet and somewhat taciturn member of Shipon's class as well as Yayoi's roommate. Though she becomes irritated easily when around people too much, she learns to enjoy spending time with Yayoi, Shipon, Arisa and the others of their group. Late in the series, she starts dating JoJo.
Ayaka Machida (町田 初佳, Machida Ayaka)

Voiced by: Megumi Toyoguchi (Japanese); Julie Ann Taylor (English)

One of the "Big 4" of Stellvia, (older students who are at the top of their classes), Ayaka is shown as competitive in the extreme. She has something of an inferiority complex which drives her to be the absolute best, and she can't tolerate seeing others better than her.
Two years in the past, when Yayoi was her classmate, she arranged an accident to ensure her own position at the top of the class. Things went a little out of hand, however, and it looked like Yayoi might lose her life, so Ayaka rescued her. Yayoi was hospitalized and traumatized, and left Stellvia for a time. Now with Shima Katase looking like she would surpass Ayaka as well, the same thing almost happened. Had Yayoi not returned to Stellvia and recognized the danger Shipon might be in, Ayaka might have seriously injured or even killed her. Due to Yayoi covering up the truth of the earlier incident, Ayaka was not expelled from Stellvia, but was suspended for a time.
After Yayoi forgives Ayaka for nearly causing her to lose her life.
Richard James (リチャード・ジェームス, Richādo Jēmusu)

Voiced by: Katsunosuke Hori (Japanese); Joe Ochman (English)

Richard is the Head Teacher of Stellvia's Space Academy. He is also the one who conducted the entrance interview for Shima. He is avuncular and usually takes the optimistic view of events. Richard also encourages his peers to put more trust in the prep students when events put them in critical situations. Richard plays a lot of chess with Hutter.
Carl Hutter (カール・ヒュッター, Kāru Hyuttā)

Voiced by: Masahiko Tanaka (Japanese); Paul St. Peter (English)

Hutter is a teacher at Stellvia's Space Academy. He appears unemotional and calm at all times. Usually, Hutter plays the Devil's Advocate against Richard James' optimism. He helps Shima with her confidence towards the end of the series. He is a sentient alien in origin later on in the series.
Jinrai Shirogane (白銀 迅雷, Shirogane Jinrai)

Voiced by: Keiji Fujiwara (Japanese); Kirk Thornton (English)

Shirogane is another teacher at Stellvia's Space Academy; he appears to teach programming. He is particularly enthusiastic about the school's athletics carnival and Astroball, (a game that has some similarities with Lacrosse), which he played in his student days at Stellvia. Passionate and determined, Jinrai is intent upon having the students' voices heard when no-one will listen. Jinrai has feelings for the flirtatious school nurse Ren.
Leila Barthes (レイラ・バルト, Reira Baruto)

Voiced by: Naomi Shindou (Japanese); Anne Loveman (English)

Instructor in charge of Pilot Training at Stellvia. She used to be an elite pilot, and spent some time wallowing in despair after losing the "elite" tag. However, she recovers from this (after an incident on a space station that was under construction) and chooses to become an instructor at Stellvia. She is tough toward the students because she wants them to succeed, she has a loving smile toward the childlike attributes of her students and is very scary when she is mad.
Ren Renge

Voiced by: Michiko Neya (Japanese); Karen Strassman (English)

A nurse at Stellvia. Ren is very flirtatious and early on in the series dates different men, which causes Jinrai to become jealous. She also works closely with the pilots, especially Kouta, who she assists with training for missions. She seems to also have feelings for Jinrai.
Joey Jones (ジョイ・ジョーンス, Joi Jōnzu)

Voiced by: Akio Suyama (Japanese); Tony Oliver (English)

Another of Shipon's classmates, Jojo (as he is called) is loud and enthusiastic. He is not very good in his studies nor pilot training and sometimes get needled because of it. Nevertheless, he is not all bad apples, he eventually starts dating Akira later on in the series. He sometimes has some rather good things to say that are very influential, he tries to cheer Akira up one time when she is depressed at the gap between her and the top students.
Pierre Takida

Voiced by: Yuji Ueda (Japanese); Richard Cansino (English)

Another of Shipon's classmates, Pierre is good looking and a big talker, but doesn't seem to have a lot more than that going for him. He likes to hit on virtually every girl he lays eyes on, even Rinna in one episode. He shows particular interest in Yayoi, but Yayoi is adamant in refusing him.
Masaru Odawara (小田原大)

Voiced by: Mitsuki Saiga (Japanese); Dave Wittenberg (English)

Another of Shipon's classmates, he is seen hanging out with Joey and Pierre. Others call him by his nickname, Dai, which is another reading for his given name in kanji (大). In the last few episodes he becomes very serious and says some very influential things which is broadcast through the solar system as the last sounds from Stellvia before the inevitable end.
Najima Gable (ナジマ・ゲブール)

Voiced by: Romi Park (Japanese); Mari Devon (English)

One of the Big 4. She usually quotes something of Shakespeare (sometimes attributing the quote to the wrong play) or the Bible. Nothing much else is known about her.
Kent Austin

Voiced by: Daisuke Kishio (Japanese); Steven Blum (English)

One of the Big 4. He usually tries to stir Ayaka up with information that could be potential competition for her with no intention of any of it leading to the "accidents" arranged by Ayaka. He gets Shipon and her friends out of a spot of trouble at the beginning when he saw them as he was passing by. Kent seems to like Ayaka more than just a friend. Though he doesn't try to make anything out of it.
Ritsuo Shoujin

Voiced by: Nobuyuki Hiyama (Japanese); Lex Lang (English)

One of the Big 4. Devoted to training, he is described as being a "Ninja" by Shipon. Shoujin is very quiet and reserved, rarely speaking. He merely nods and "hmm"'s when in agreement.

== Media ==
=== Anime ===
Episode	Plot summary
1	"Welcome" - Shima departs the earth, saying goodbye to her family. Her brother hands Shima some Conpetto and says goodbye as Shima Boards the transport ship headed for Foundation II - Stellvia. Onboard she meets Arisa and the director of Stellvia. As they talk, the transport ship is in contact with Stellvia, specifically speaking to Kent Austin, who welcomes them to Stellvia and prepares the students already on Stellvia to go out and welcome them in their ships, which are led by Ayeka. Everyone on board the transport is excited to be going to Stellvia as they arrive.
2	"Hesitation" - Shima settles into her life onboard Stellvia. After the initial introduction assembly, Shima begins her classes and is required to select which subjects she would like to learn, and meets a new friend Yayoi. She starts the very first lesson she selected, which was space training. Shima was at first embarrassed to wear the under uniform but eventually settles in. Shima's first space flight in the Bianca doesn't go well, and the instructor tries to stop her machine, but is locked out of the system by Shima, which in turn leads to Ayeka Machida of the Big 4 helping, but eventually the Bianca runs out of power and Shima is towed back to Stellvia. Shima feels disheartened.
3	"I'm Sorry!" - Shimas work is going fairly well in class and Arisa invites herself and all her friends over for a study group with Shima. While Shima was explaining the work to Kouta and the barrier that will be used, Shimas friends were playing around, much to Akiras displeasure, which leads to Akira coming to their room and telling them to be quiet, which then leads to shimas friend touching the panel and overwriting data on Stellvia's server. They decide to go to the main control room of Stellvia to try to right the situation, Along the way they run into Kent Austin, Najima, and Shoujin of the Big 4 in different places, upon reaching the control room, they are discovered by Ayeka and Yayoi, which leads to Shimas friend touching the panel again, which makes the situation worse, and Shima worried..the instructor punishes them all after..
4	"I'll Do My Best!" - Shima while working off her punishment feels disheartened after a talk with Ayeka which makes her realise a few things, meanwhile Shimas friends were looking for her and run into Ayeka who tells them that Shima may be leaving Stellvia. Shima runs into Kouta while trying to be alone, and tells her not to worry too much about the data when flying in the Bianca upon the next space training lesson, Shima takes Koutas advice into consideration, and much to everyone's surprise does very well, and flies almost perfectly, afterwards the instructor talks with Shima about her flying/lesson and shows her the flight record and ways she can improve her performance.
5	"Opportunity" - The Students on board Stellvia are informed of a Competition between foundations, and are motivated to do their best by Kent Austin of the Big 4; he tells them whoever wins the Competition will be considered for the Great Mission. This motivates the students to do their best. Professor Shirogane emphasizes the importance of Winning the Astro-Ball event, and tells the Big 4 to bring the glory back home to Stellvia. The Big 4 then tests the new students in a difficult task in search of a fifth member of the team. Shima is the only one that manages to come out on top and get past the Big 4, and so she is invited join Stellvias' Astro-Ball team at the event.
6	"I Won't Lose!" - The competition between foundations is on in full force, with Stellvia currently in first place. The Big 4 along with Shima face another foundation in the Astro Ball event, but Shima accidental touches a beacon and is disqualified in the first round. Shima is disheartened but is cheered up by her friends that evening at dinner. While at the table they meet another team, who seemed confident in defeating the Stellvia. Rinna defends Shima by referring to the amazing save Shima made in the game in a Bianca, and says she doubts any of them could do the same in a training ship. The next day during their match, the other team is only concerned with the Big 4 and plan their defense accordingly, leaving Shima completely open. She blocks the other team's attack and takes the ball in to score. Now full of spirit and confidence, Shima becomes the main offensive player of the team along with Ayeka - Kent Austin moves into defence - and all are thrilled with Stellvia's amazing victory thanks to Shima.
7	"Frustration" - Shima is improving in every subject to everyone's surprise. She recently ranked 12th in a test, and her friends are optimistic she will eventually make 1st place. The students are introduced to the lightning joust with their biancas, with each student facing one another in turn meanwhile Ayeka seems interested in the students' results, as Kent Austin/Ayeka discuss about Shima, and how shes turned into an Honour student the students then face the regular students in the Lightning Joust, which in turn leads to a rather interesting match between Ayeka Machida of the Big 4 and Shima.
8	"Me?" - A transfer student arrives from Ultima Station.
9	"I'm Going" - The second wave from the supernova that destroyed the Earth and colored the universe green 189 years ago has approached the solar system. The day after tomorrow will be the day of the Great Mission to protect Earth.
10	"Welcome Back!" - The second wave is moments away from reaching Earth and everyone is prepared, with the Great wall all but set up, and the tatsonaut generators powering and protecting the Earth and the Moon, and the various Langrange points. Kaedes and Biancas are currently in space to destroy any fragments that may penetrate the Great Wall, and repair any holes in the wall that may occur. While Shima is out in space with most of the other students readying herself with the big 4 also, Shima's friends are closely observing the events as they happen along with everyone from the earth. Shima saves a pilot whose ship was about to be hit, but unfortunately something went wrong. The pilot was saved but the barrier that Shima was trying to set up to destroy the rock didn't work, and her ship was slightly damaged. Shima suffers a loss of confidence and returns to the Stellvia, but is soon cheered up by Arisa and Rinna as well as her overfriends, as the realization that she saved someone kicks in, and she regains confidence. But there's a problem - a titanic-sized asteroid has penetrated the Great wall. While the big 4 and the other students try to destroy it with the lasers, on their Biancas/Kaedes, it just isn't having much effect The teachers onboard Stellvia as well as Kouta/Shima and her friends decide that the only way to destroy the asteroid is with the Infinite Robot, as they launch and destroy the asteroid, they repaired the breach in the Great wall, as the second wave passes... The earth is well
11	"The Real You" - The Great Mission was a success and now they're going to the next level. The Biancas are switching to the DLS system. With the Direct Link System, the information flows directly into the pilots head, but it's bad for their health.
12	"Confession" - It's Christmas time and it's also Rinna's farewell party. Also Ayaka Machida faces expulsion for her attempts to injure Shima.
13	"Winter Vacation" - It's vacation time and everyone gets to go back to Earth.
14	"Dream and Reality" - An emergency assembly has been called after the Ultima Station falls under attack from and unknown source.
15	"I Don't Understand" - It's time to go back to class.
16	"In Doubt" - With a group from the Akapusso and Stellvia heading towards the Ultima in an effort to rescue the trapped crew members onboard they encounter the beings from another dimension that have been randomly appearing throughout the Solar System. The rescue mission fails and the realisation that rescuing the people on the ultima will be difficult, Shima and Kouta inside the infinite robot cover the escape of the Biancas from the Stellvia, and Akapusso.
17	"Battle!" - The Infinity gets a new weapon and everyone tries to decipher the enemy's motives.
18	"Distant Voice" - The rescue mission to the Ultima Station is complete and now it's time for a welcome back party for Shima, Kouta and Rinna. Afterwards, Shima & Kouta are chosen to take the Infinity out to learn more about the mysterious vocal signals.
19	"Cry Baby, Hot-Head" - After Shima breaks down during a mission, Akira, Yayoi and Aris start fighting with each other over how to cheer up Shima.
20	"Let There Be A Future for You" - While Rinna throws a party, the Supreme Council meets to discuss the Cosmic Fracture.
21	"Invisible Wall" - The council has discovered a way to disrupt the Cosmic Fracture.
22	"Their Own Path" - It's time for the Genesis Mission, in which the Infinity is going to fire a massive laser powered by the Foundation in the hope of destroying the Cosmic Fracture.
23	"That's Why You've There" - Shima is chosen to fly the Halcyon, a giant robot similar to the Infinity. Evacuation plans are underway to escape the Cosmic Fracture.
24	"Darkness Falls Again" - The Stellvia arrives at Pluto for the Genesis Mission. Meanwhile, most of the cadets are hiding in the air ducts.
25	"Goodbye" - The Genesis Mission has begun, but the gravity currents are playing havoc.
26	"Shining Voice" - The Halcyon has been hit by the gravity currents, but it and Shima are alright. Now, as a last chance effort for the Mission, Stellvia must be sacrificed in order to destroy the Cosmic Fracture.

=== Manga ===
No.	Original release date	Original ISBN	North American release date	North American ISBN
1	November 27, 2003	978-4-8402-2537-3	June 25, 2005	978-1-59796-060-1
001. "Welcome to Stellvia!"; 002. "Lost Bearings"; 003. "I'm Sorry!"; 004. "I'll Do My Best"; 005. "Burn Shipon!"; 006. "Bring It On!", Part 1; 007. "Bring It On!", Part 2; Extra.
2	August 27, 2004	978-4-8402-2798-8	September 25, 2005	978-1-59796-061-8
008. "Melody of the Stars", Part 1; 009. "Melody of the Stars", Part 2; 010. "Melody of the Stars", Part 3; 011. "Melody of the Stars", Part 4; 012. "Melody of the Stars", Part 5; 013. "To Save This Planet", Part 1; 014. "To Save This Planet", Part 2; 015. "Reach for Tomorrow"; 016. "Beyond Stellvia"

=== Video games ===
Two video games have been released based on the anime series, both named "Uchuu no Stellvia". The PlayStation 2 game was released on the 22 January 2004. The Game Boy Advance game was released on the 23 April 2004. Both games are adventure dating simulations though they do vary in gameplay.

In the PlayStation 2 game, the player assumes the role of a new student who has enrolled at the Stellvia Space Station Foundation. Each day he assigns various commands on what to do such as studying or resting in the same type of gameplay that Tokimeki Memorial has except for weekends since there is no school then. At the weekends he may invite a character on a date. There are various events to be seen in the game and there are 10 multiple endings. The game resembles the aforementioned Tokimeki Memorial game series in many ways (though in Tokimeki Memorial the player only assigns various commands for the coming week and not for each day).

The Game Boy Advance game is different from the PlayStation 2 game in terms of gameplay and plays a lot like the famous Sotsugyou series of games also known as Graduation in the west. The main difference in this game as opposed to the PlayStation 2 game is that the player assumes the role of a new teacher instead of a student in the PS2 game. He must teach the four main heroines (Ayaka and Rinna also come into the game later on as his students) various subjects so that they are prepared for the Great Mission. The game is like Graduation in that the player has to balance out the various girl's stats and must not neglect them since in this case, they start to skip classes and the game can end. Throughout the classes the player character must ask the girl's various questions on the corresponding subject. After a question a number of things can happen. A girl may put up her hand to answer the question, the player can also choose one of the girls to answer or can answer the question themselves. The player may also individually teach a specific girl on subjects. Various events can be seen with the various characters from the series at lunchtime or after school.

== Reception ==
The reviewer at THEM Anime Reviews awarded it 4 stars out of 5, writing that "It could have been better with the direction of the plot and some character development, but it's still a wonderful experience.". The show was also reviewed for the Anime News Network, Its initial DVD releases in the mid-2000s received several reviews, with the reviewer awarding it a score of B for most reviewed episodes, but concluding with a score of A−, writing that "The final volume of is an example of what can happen with a series when all of the elements come together just right. The result is a thrilling, dramatic, inspiring, and ultimately very satisfying conclusion to a sci-fi series that's a bit different from the norm". ANN also reviewed it in 2021, with the reviewer opining that it is "an excellent show, a must-see for fans of science fiction, and anything with well-written characters" and awarding it a score of A−.

The show's entry in The Encyclopedia of Science Fiction states that the "utopian undercurrent – a faith in human cooperation and youth potential – has earned Stellvia a modest but enduring fanbase who appreciate its uplifting message, although some critics found the pacing slow in the early episodes, criticized mid-series filler content, tonal jump between light comedy and dire stakes, and rushed plot escalation in the latter part of the show, with aforementioned loose threads remaining by the show's finale. Stellvia remains a distinctly hopeful entry in early-2000s science fiction anime, combining a space academy training narrative with a disaster-aversion plot and maintaining faith in human cooperation and youth potential throughout.".
