= Gekiganger III =

Original video animation

- Gekiganger III

熱血ロボ ゲキ・ガンガー3
- Genre: Comedy, Mecha
- Original video animation
- Written by: Yuichiro Oguro
- Studio: Xebec
- Licensed by: NA: Crunchyroll
- Released: February 21, 1998
- Runtime: 30 minutes

Gekiganger III (ゲキ・ガンガー3, Geki Gangā Surī) is an anime series within the anime series Martian Successor Nadesico that plays a critical part in the plot thereof. Gekiganger III was designed to mimic 1970s Super Robots, especially Getter Robo. Initially, only Gai Daigoji and Akito Tenkawa are depicted as enjoying the series. Later in the series, Hikaru Amano becomes the other resident anime fanatic, and towards the end of the series everyone on the ship learns to love the series.

== Story ==
Gekiganger III exists only as brief clips within Nadesico, but a basic storyline can nonetheless be determined. As seen in the OVA, the story began with Professor Kokubunji (a character similar to the professors seen in other Super Robot series, such as Professor Saotome of Getter Robo) discovering cave paintings somewhere underground placed by the "Super Paleolithic people". The paintings predicted that the Kyo'akk Empire would invade the Earth, and provided plans for a super robot, Gekiganger III.

Other clips seen throughout Nadesico establish the characters and setting. The main characters, and pilots of the titular robot, are Tenku Ken (A reference to Voltes V's sword name), Umitsubame Joe, and Daichi Akira. The characters are similar in appearance and personality to the Getter Team from Getter Robo, as well as having counterparts in Nadesico itself (most prominently Gai and the Jovian robot pilots).

Also similar to Getter is the Gekiganger robot, which is made up of three machines: the Gekiga Jet, piloted by Ken; the Gekiga Marine, piloted by Joe; and the Gekiga Tank, piloted by Akira. The names of the machines are similar to three of the component parts of Combattler V, bringing another 70s mecha anime into the influence on the series.

Like Getter, the machines assemble in three different ways to form three robots: Gekiganger III is formed with Jet as the head and torso, Marine as its waist and upper legs, and Tank as its lower legs, and is similar to Getter 1 in its preference for air combat. Umiganger is formed with Marine as the head and torso, Tank as the waist and Jet as the legs, and is the fastest, but weakest, form of Gekiganger. Finally, Rikuganger is formed with Tank as the head and torso, Jet as the waist and Marine as the legs, and is slow but has great brute strength. These last two, however, switch their best areas of battle from Getter Robo: Umiganger works best underwater and Rikuganger works more on land, whereas Getter 2 was the land-based robot and Getter 3 was for water in that series.

The villains of Gekiganger are the Kyo'akk Empire, an alien race from the "Dark String Universe" (a galaxy shaped like the infinity symbol). They are led by the Emperor Hyperion, and under him Prince Akara. Throughout Nadesico we see that Akara sends out many "mecha-monsters" to fight Gekiganger.

There are only a few major plot advancements that occur in Gekiganger, many of which are actually shown out of order in Nadesico. In one clip, a new character, Cowboy Johnny is introduced. He is from America, and pilots the "Texas Robo" machine, an obvious parody of Jack King and the "Texas Mack" from Getter Robo. Another clip features the death of Akara's sidekick, Mii-e Mii-e who was in love with the oblivious prince. Akara himself is killed later after infiltrating a highschool finding to his shock that humans are capable of emotions.

By far the most important plot moment in Gekiganger is the death of Joe, at the hands of Prince Akara's replacement, General Masaka. In Nadesico, seeing this scene is a major bonding moment between Akito and Gai, and it is seen and heard several times in the first few episodes.

The characters continue to watch Gekiganger past this point, though not much is known about the remainder of the series. Joe is replaced by a new character, Ryuuzaki Tetsuya, and the Gekiganger III is replaced by Gekiganger V. (Like Combattler V, the V is pronounced as the letter V; the English dub, however, referred to it as "Gekiganger 5"). Eventually, it is seen that Masaka is defeated. The final episode features a battle between the Gekiganger V (upgraded into "Spaceganger") and Emperor Hyperion, which Gekiganger is losing until the original Gekiganger III appears, piloted by Joe. With a final Super Passion Slash and Double Gekigan Fire, Hyperion is defeated. However, by this point most of the Nadesico characters have given up their fanaticism over Gekiganger; several characters criticize the ending.

== OVA ==
The Gekiganger III OVA, "Hot-Blooded Great Battle!" includes all clips of Gekiganger shown in Nadesico, a few never-before-seen clips, and a new "movie" featuring a battle between Gekiganger III and the Super Paleolithic people who designed it. Akara is also seen here, but later allies himself with the heroes against their common enemy. The opening mimics that of Mazinger Z vs. The Great General of Darkness, showing pictures of Gekiganger III that children drew, and involves a similar plotline to that movie as well.

== Gekiganger within Nadesico ==
As Nadesico progresses, we find that the very reason the Jovians (who are really humans) are attacking Earth is because they believe their cause to be just and that their path is the only true righteous one as they idolize the Gekiganger anime series. Toward the end, even Captain Yurika Misumaru is a Gekiganger otaku. In the end, the Gekiganger series becomes a lesson on why people should not be narrow minded and think that their point of view is that of everyone else. That their moral code is the only one. A lot of violence and death occurs as a result of the Jovian's adaptation of this point of view into their society and their leader's attempts to preserve this adapted moral code.

Episode 14 of Nadesico, Let's go with hot-blooded anime, is both a recap episode for that series and an episode of Gekiganger III. In that episode, the characters from Gekiganger watch Nadesico's recap episode and comment on it at times. Both the heroes and villains of Gekiganger draw inspiration from Nadesico for their new technologies, with Prince Akara copying the Nadesico's distortion field and Professor Kokubunji countering it with the Gekigan Flare, which he later admits was inspired by Nadesico. At the end of the episode, the Nadesico crew is seen watching the Gekiganger episode. Despite the continuity paradoxes this relationship causes, this episode is apparently canon to Gekiganger, if not to Nadesico, as Akara uses the distortion field again in the movie. The comments made by Ruri Hoshino in regards to the story and how the next episode will get back on track with it at the end of the episode along with the fact that the placing of the episode seems odd giving the events in the episodes before and after episode 14 seem to suggest the Nadesico episode is non-canonical at the very least.

== See also ==
- Story within a story
- Kujibiki Unbalance
