= Yumi Matsuzawa =

Yumi Matsuzawa 松澤 由美
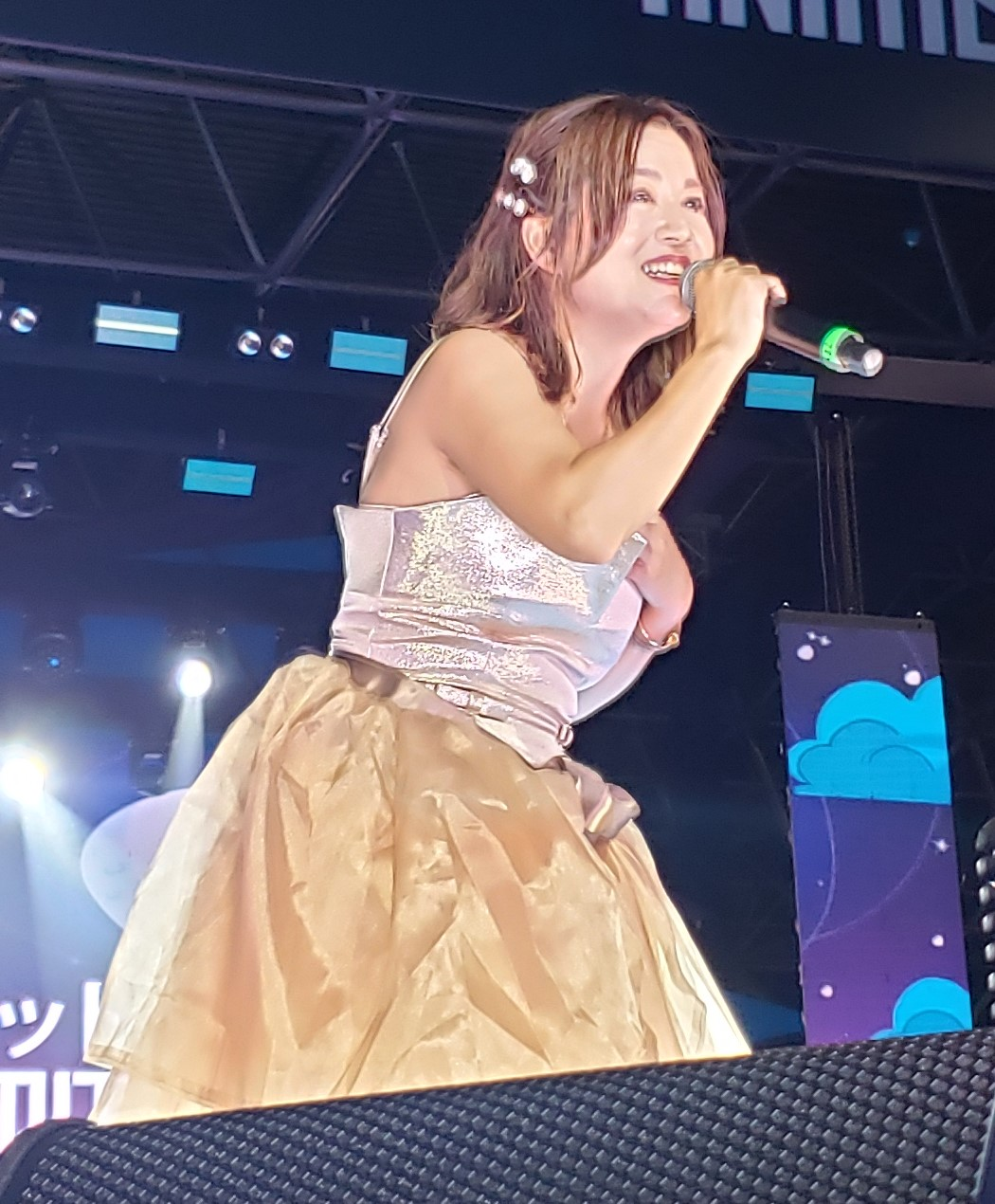
- Matsuzawa performing at Anime Summit 2024, in Brasília, Brazil

Background information
- Born: March 29, 1974 (age 52); Fujimi, Saitama, Japan
- Genres: Anison
- Years active: 1996 -

Yumi Matsuzawa (松澤 由美, Matsuzawa Yumi; born March 29, 1974) is a Japanese singer from Fujimi, Saitama.

== Career ==
Matsuzawa is best known for her debut release, "You Get to Burning", the opening theme for Martian Successor Nadesico, as well as the movie version's theme song "Dearest" and the song "Chikyuugi", the opening theme for the arc The Hades-Sanctuary of Saint Seiya.

She was part of the judging panel at the Animax Anison Grand Prix, with fellow noted anime singers Ichirou Mizuki and Mitsuko Horie.

== Touring ==
Matsuzawa has frequently performed abroad, most often in South America.

== Health scare ==
In 2016, she had surgery to address early-stage breast cancer.

== Discography ==
=== Albums ===
==== Best Album ====
- Ashiato (あしあと) (February 28, 2007)

==== Mini Album ====
- birth (2011) -self-produced-
- My Place ~for my dear~ (2013) -self-produced-

==== Cover Album ====
- Anicapella (アニカペラ) (June 6, 2007)

==== Various Artists ====
- Lovers Reggae (July 23, 2009)

=== Singles ===
Year	Title	Peak	Label	Notes
Year	Title	(Oricon) /	Label	Notes
1996	"You Get to Burning"	9	Starchild Records	Martian Successor Nadesico opening theme
1997	"Otoha" (音波)	83	Eastwest Japan	
1998	"Earth Song: Daiji no Uta" (earth song -大地の詩-)	—	Eastwest Japan	
1998	"Kokoro" (ココロ)	—	Eastwest Japan	
1998	"Dearest"	18	Starchild Records	Martian Successor Nadesico: The Motion Picture – Prince of Darkness theme song
1999	"Ari no Mama de" (ありのままで)	90	Eastwest Japan	
1999	"Dare mo Shiranai Chizu de" (誰も知らない地図で)	77	Media Factory	Jibaku-kun opening theme
2000	"Asu no Egao no Tame ni" (明日の笑顔のために)	83	Pony Canyon	Gate Keepers opening theme
2001	"Jikū: Toki no Sora" (時空 -ときのそら-)	—	Maxell E-Cube	Salaryman Kintarō opening theme
2001	"Kanashii yo" (哀しいよ)	—	Maxell E-Cube	
2003	"Chikyūgi" (地球ぎ)	125	Nippon Columbia	Saint Seiya: Hades - Chapter Sanctuary opening theme
2003	"Kimi to Onaji Aozora" (君と同じ青空)	—	Nippon Columbia	Saint Seiya: Hades - Chapter Sanctuary ending theme
2006	"Takusu Mono e: My Dear" (託す者へ～My Dear～)	182	Nippon Columbia	Saint Seiya: Hades - Chapter Inferno ending theme
2006	"Neverland"	72	Creative Idea Of Associates	Summon Night 4 theme song
2012	"Celeb Neet" (セレブニート)	—	ETB RIGHTS	Musashino-sen no Shimai theme song

=== Collaborations ===
- Anison All Stars - imagine (October 16, 2009) -John Lennon cover song-
