= Martian Successor Nadesico: The Motion Picture – Prince of Darkness =

1998 film by Tatsuo Satō

- Directed by: Tatsuo Satō
- Written by: Tatsuo Satō
- Produced by: Yukinao Shimoji
- Starring: Yūji Ueda; Omi Minami; Houko Kuwashima; Yukie Nakama; Noriko Hidaka; Shin-ichiro Miki
- Cinematography: Kazushi Torikoshi; Akio Kanezawa
- Edited by: Masahiro Matsumura
- Music by: Takayuki Hattori
- Production companies: Xebec; Production I.G
- Distributed by: Toei Company
- Release date: August 8, 1998 (Japan)
- Running time: 85 minutes
- Language: Japanese

Martian Successor Nadesico: The Motion Picture – Prince of Darkness (機動戦艦ナデシコ -The prince of darkness-, Kidō Senkan Nadeshiko -Za purinsu obu dākunesu-), also known as Prince of Darkness Nadesico or Nadesico the Movie: Prince of Darkness, is a 1998 Japanese animated science fiction film written and directed by Tatsuo Satō, and it is a sequel to the series Martian Successor Nadesico. The story is a direct sequel to Nadesico: The Blank of Three Years, a video game for the Sega Saturn that takes place immediately after the TV series ends, and before the movie begins. The movie won the prestigious Seiun Award for Best Dramatic Presentation, Prince of Darkness also win Anime Grand Prix from Animage magazine for Best Title, Best Female character (Ruri Hoshino), and Best Song ("Dearest" by Yumi Matsuzawa), and It was a nominated for the Animation Kobe for Theatrical Film Award but lost to Pokémon: The First Movie (which later won Stinkers Bad Movie Awards for Worst Achievement in Animation). Originally licensed by ADV Films, the movie, along with the TV Series have been re-licensed to Nozomi Entertainment.

== Plot ==
Two years have passed since the third battle of Mars, with the Nadesico taking possession of the Ruin. The Earth and the Jovian Federation have come to an uneasy peace. However, Akito and Yurika have both vanished and are presumed dead. Meanwhile, a splinter group of the original Jovian Federation called the "Martian Successors" appears, intending to continue the war and take revenge on both Earth and Nergal. A 15-year-old Ruri Hoshino is now the new captain of the highly mobile battleship Nadesico B and has earned the respect and awe of many in the Military thanks to her unparalleled skill with machines, made her gains the nickname "Cyber Fairy". Most of the original Nadesico crew return in order to prevent the Earth from experiencing another war, along two new crew members from Nadesico B who serve under Ruri: A young boy named Ensign Hari Makibi, who like Ruri is a genetically engineered prodigy, and Saburota Takasugi a womanizer and a former member of the Jovian Federation Defense Force.

At Akito's grave, Ruri meets Akito and learns that he is still alive. Akito explains that he and Yurika had been captured and he suffered Boson Jumping experiments by the Martian Successors, leaving his brain severely affected to the point of losing his sense of taste and his skin turning white. Akito gives Ruri his recipe for Ramen Noodles as a way to remember the person he used to be. Akito leaves after fighting the Martian Successors and obtains a high-powered battleship from Nergal in order to go to Mars and rescue Yurika, The Nadesico C also heads to Mars intent on arresting the Martian Successors.

Akito fights and kills the Martian Successors' leader, rescuing Yurika, while Ruri takes control of all their computers and weapons, forcing the rest of the group to surrender. Following their victory Akito departs, not wanting Yurika or anyone else to see him in his current state. When asked by Ryoko if they should go after Akito, Ruri says that Akito will return eventually she but will chase after him if he doesn't because of how he is important to them all.

== Companion game ==
Nadesico: The Blank of Three Years, a video game for the Sega Saturn, was released September 23, 1998, one month after Prince of Darkness hit theaters. The game takes place immediately after the TV series ends, and before the movie begins, filling in on details that leads up to the plot of the movie. However, the game was never translated and released outside Japan.

== Characters ==
=== Crew of the Nadesico-B ===
- Lieutenant Commander Ruri Hoshino - now sixteen, Ruri is the captain of the Nadesico-B and idolised by much of the military as the Electronic Fairy. She is glad to see Akito is still alive, but hurt to see how much he's changed. She views new crewmate Hari (a product, like her, of genetic engineering) as a younger brother. Her first name refers to 瑠璃 (Ruri; "lapis lazuli").
- Ensign Hari Makibi (Noriko Hidaka) - a bridge officer aboard the Nadesico-B (and the only major new cast member), Hari is a genetically engineered genius with abilities similar to Ruri's; but unlike her, he's very emotional. He is jealous of her relationship to the first Nadesico crew. His first name refers to 玻璃 (Hari; "quartz"). Quartz and lapis lazuli are elements of 七宝 (shippō; lit. 'Seven treasures') in Infinite Life Sutra.
- Saburota Takasugi (Shin-ichiro Miki)- previously seen as an officer in the Jovian Federation, Saburota is now a First Lieutenant in the UESF, and serves as Ruri's Tactical Officer. He has dyed his hair blond.

=== Other members of the Unified Forces ===
- Commander Jun Aoi - now captain of his own ship (the UESF 3rd Fleet battleship Amaryllis), Jun has grown but is still completely overwhelmed by the personalities around him. In particular, he is bullied by Yukina into letting her join the Nadesico-C's mission.

=== Former crew of the Nadesico ===
- Ryoko Subaru - ace Aestivalis pilot, Ryoko now sports her natural black hair instead of green. She is one of the first to learn of Yurika's fate and is enraged that she is unable to rescue her right away. Still fond of Akito, she is teased by her fellows Izumi and Hikaru about her interactions with Saburota.
- Izumi Maki - Izumi is the hostess of a bar when Mr. Prospector arrives to recruit her.
- Hikaru Amano - Aestivalis pilot and rabid Gekigangar III fangirl, Hikaru has become a somewhat overstressed manga artist. Before agreeing to join the Nadesico-C, she convinces Ruri & Co. to help her finish an issue before her deadline.

=== Those with secret fates ===
- Akito Tenkawa - thought to be dead, Akito proves to be the Prince of Darkness of the title. One of many Class A Jumpers abducted by the Martian Successors, he was subjected to experiments that have damaged his body, destroyed his sense of taste (a terrible fate for a cook), and hardened his personality; he has no compunction about killing those who block his mission to rescue Yurika.
- Lapis Lazuli (Yukie Nakama) - A young girl with long, ice-blue hair. Lapis is another product of Nergal's labs, created with the hopes of re-creating the success of Ruri Hoshino, and is part of the One-Man, One-Ship Project. When the Martian Successors betrayed Nergal, Lapis was among those abducted and was experimented on. The experiments ended up destroying her ability to feel emotions. Lapis was later rescued during a rescue operation conducted by Nergal, and given the Nergal-designed Corvette Eucharis, which she controls entirely on her own. Lapis later becomes partnered with Akito, and together, supplements their destroyed senses. (Her name refers to the blue gem, lapis lazuli.)
- Yurika Misumaru - also thought killed during jumping trials, Yurika was another abductee. The Martian Successors have fused her with the Ruin that controls all Boson Jumps, giving them an unprecedented level of control. Her rescue is the key objective of both Akito and the Nadesico-C's mission.
- Inez Fressange - generally believed to be dead, Inez was actually hidden as a Nergal subterfuge when the abduction of Class A Jumpers became apparent. She rejoins when the Nadesico-C is launched, and is key to jumping it to the final confrontation on Mars.

=== The Martian Successors ===
- Jovian Vice-Admiral Haruki Kusakabe - de facto leader of the Jovians during the war, Kusakabe vanished afterward and infiltrated himself and his so-called "Martian Successors" into the Hisago Plan. He and his scientists retrieved the Ruin, intercepted Class A Jumpers during transit, and planned to solidify their position with a monopoly on precision boson jumping. Although his rebellion ends in failure, it is insinuated that he is capable of starting again.
- Hokushin- A mysterious assassin hired by the Martian Successors to eliminate any high level threats to Kusakabe. It is insinuated that the assassin was responsible for Akito's condition and is obsessed with torturing him. He is a potent bosun jumper and is a master of Martain Swordsmenship. His personal combat unit, the Yatenko, enables to use bosun jumps at will and usually appears with a team of 6 who inferior but still formidable units. He is killed at the end of the movie.
