= Chi-Chi (Dragon Ball) =

Female character in the Dragon Ball franchise

- Dragon Ball character
- Chi-Chi as depicted in Dragon Ball Z: Battle of Gods (2013)
- First appearance: Dragon Ball chapter 11: "...And into the Fire!", 27 November 1984 (Weekly Shōnen Jump 1984)
- Created by: Akira Toriyama
- Voiced by (Japanese): Mayumi Shō (1986–1991); Naoko Watanabe (1991–present); Ai Kakuma (Mini; Dragon Ball Daima)
- Voiced by (English): Cynthia Cranz (adult, Funimation (Note: 1999-present)); Laura Bailey (child, Funimation (Note: 2001-2008)); Brittany Lauda (child, Funimation (Note: Kakarot DLC)); Other: Mitch Frankenberger (Creative Products Corp.); Andrea Libman (child, BLT); Laara Sadiq (Ocean (Note: most DBZ episodes and third film)); Lisa Ann Beley (adult, Ocean (Note: first two films)); Nicole Oliver (adult, Ocean (Note: From ep. 269 [254 edited] on)); Lydia Mackay (adult, Funimation (Note: voice double for DB ep. 123)); Monika Antonelli (child, Funimation (Note: DBZ ep. 202, and voice double for DB ep. 7)); Katie Rowan (child, Blue Water); Carol-Anne Day (teen, Blue Water); Debbie Munro (adult, Blue Water (Note: DBGT)); Sharon Mann (adult, AB Groupe); Erin Fitzgerald (Evolution video game); Michelle Ruff (Bang Zoom! (Note: Super))
- Portrayed by: Jamie Chung (Dragonball Evolution)

In-universe information
- Species: Human
- Occupation: Housewife
- Family: Ox-King (father); Ox Queen (mother)
- Spouse: Goku (husband)
- Children: Gohan (son); Goten (son)
- Relatives: Videl (daughter-in-law); Bardock (father-in-law); Gine (mother-in-law); Raditz (brother-in-law); Pan (granddaughter); Son Goku Jr. (great-great-grandson; Dragon Ball GT)

Chi-Chi (Japanese: チチ, Hepburn: Chichi), sometimes written as Chi Chi or Chichi, is a fictional character from the Dragon Ball media franchise. Created by Akira Toriyama, she first appears in Chapter #11 of the Dragon Ball manga entitled "...And into the Fire!". Typically portrayed as the shrewish and fiery wife of series protagonist Son Goku and the overprotective mother of Son Gohan and Son Goten, Chi-Chi is considered to be one of the most prominent female characters in the franchise, and is featured consistently in merchandise and in cosplay by the Dragon Ball fandom.

== Development ==
Chi-Chi is known by different names in other language localizations of the Dragon Ball anime adaptation. For example, she is known as "Milk" in Hispanic-American Spanish dub. Lisa Nguyen from TheGamer suggested that her name was changed for Latin American localizations because the word "chi chi" is used as vulgar slang for female breasts or urine in the regions. Her original swimsuit style costume was based on a costume earlier manga character from the same creator called Pola from Pola & Roid. Toriyama had expressed slight disdain for the character in a 2003 interview by saying:

To be honest, I'm really not fond of Chi-Chi as a character. (laughs) In the middle of the comic, I started to think, "I don't want to draw her anymore," and, sort of as a way of spiting myself, I decided, "you'll have to draw her if she gets married to Goku, so marry them off!" So, I drew her as a kind of punishment. (laughs)

This was after one of the animators asked Toriyama if he preferred either Bulma or Chi-Chi.

=== Portrayal ===
Chi-Chi is voiced by Mayumi Shō in the Japanese version of the series up until Dragon Ball Z episode 88, from which point she is voiced by Naoko Watanabe. However, in Dragon Ball Daima, a mini version of Chi-Chi was voiced by Ai Kakuma. In the Funimation English dub, she is voiced by Laura Bailey as a child and Cynthia Cranz as an adult. In the Ocean dub, she was voiced by Andrea Libman as a child and by Laara Sadiq and Lisa Ann Beley respectively as an adult.

Chi-Chi is portrayed by American actress Jamie Chung in the American live-action film Dragonball Evolution; her voice was dubbed over by Ami Koshimizu in the Japanese version of the film. An important scene in the film involves Chi-Chi fighting a duplicate of herself, the development of which Chung described as a "technical, meticulous process" which took three days to film. Chung worked extensively with her stunt double for the scene, which involved mimicking each other's movements in conjunction with the use of CGI body replacement technology, or engaging with an imaginary version of herself.

== Personality ==
As a child, Chi-Chi's personality is innocent, shy and sweet. In Dragon Ball Z onwards, she takes on a tiger mother archetype and frequently has violent outbursts towards Goku and the other characters.

== Appearances ==
=== Dragon Ball ===
Chi-Chi first appears as an unnamed child running away from a dinosaur, which she later decapitates with a blade attachment on her helmet. After an awkward encounter with Yamcha, she later meets Goku, who offered her to ride with him on his flying nimbus cloud. When Goku ignorantly patted Chi-Chi's crotch with his foot to determine her gender, she instinctively reacted by smacking Goku, but then became bashful and believed that Goku liked her. Chi-Chi and Goku's interactions would continually display Goku's naivety about love and emotions; Chi-Chi tells Goku that when she becomes older, he will be the person to take her hand in marriage, to which he agrees, thinking that "marriage" was a kind of food. She would meet Goku again at the beginning of the Red Ribbon Army Saga, when he would visit her to search for one of the Dragon Balls, which at the time was being sought by both Emperor Pilaf and Colonel Silver of the Red Ribbon Army.

Years later, Chi-Chi resurfaced as a competitor at the 23rd Tenka'ichi Budôkai martial arts tournament and kept her identity concealed. Chi-Chi is angry that Goku had never come back to keep his promise to marry her, which he had completely forgotten about. They eventually faced each other in a tournament match; after winning the match, Goku is shocked to realize that his opponent was in fact Chi-Chi, who had grown up as he had. Being a good-natured man, Goku decides to keep his promise of settling down with Chi-Chi, and publicly announces that he will marry her. In the anime-only filler conclusion to the Dragon Ball TV series, they would go on several adventures to retrieve a magical fan in order to put out the fire on Chi-Chi's mountain home to save her father. By the end of the original Dragon Ball series, she and Goku are married.

=== Dragon Ball Z ===
Chi-Chi's role in the succeeding Dragon Ball Z series revolves around her status as Goku's wife and mother to their son, Son Gohan, and later, Son Goten. She demonstrates behavior typical of a Kyōiku mama, and is adamant that her children, Gohan in particular, prioritize academic pursuits and stays away from Goku's lifestyle of fighting and constant conflict. She often becomes frustrated whenever Gohan is encouraged to hone his fighting skills or is drawn to a fight, so much that often Chi-Chi is willing to go to battle herself to defend her son. Under her influence, Gohan worked hard to develop a career path as an academic scholar. She is widowed after Goku sacrifices his life to stop Cell from destroying the world, and would go on to raise Gohan and Goten, the latter being born shortly after the events of the Cell Saga arc, as a single mother.

During the Buu Saga arc, Chi-Chi's parenting style is depicted as not being as strict with Goten and a now teenaged Gohan, though she is still very protective of her children. She initially disapproved Gohan training Videl, misunderstanding that the two were dating. However, her mind changes drastically when she learns that Videl lives with a rich family, encouraging Gohan to marry her. Along with the family members and associates of the Dragon Team, she was relocated to Kami's Lookout after Majin Buu was unleashed and went on a rampage throughout the world. When she learned of Gohan's apparent death at the hands of Buu, Chi-Chi takes the news badly. She confronts Buu when he arrives at Kami's hideout, scolding and slapping the creature out of anger for the lives he has taken; Buu retaliates by turning her into an egg and crushing her. Chi Chi and everyone else who had died at Buu's hand are wished back to life at the end of the storyline, and is happily reunited with her husband, who has been brought back to life by Old Kai order to defeat Buu. By the end of Dragon Ball Z, Chi-Chi becomes a grandmother to Pan and mother-in-law to Videl, who ended up marrying Gohan.

Chi-Chi appears in multiple Dragon Ball films which carry the Dragon Ball Z branding, often in minor supporting roles which provide comic relief.

=== Dragon Ball Super ===
Chi-Chi's appearances in the Dragon Ball Super series continue to be defined by her relationships with her husband and sons. She often reminds Goku that he has a responsibility to provide for his family as a husband and a father, and continually nags him about getting a job and earning more money, later Goku begins his job of farming. While she still tries to keep everyone in her family away from physical violence, she appears to accept that fighting is in a Saiyan's nature. However, in the Future Trunks arc, Future Chi-Chi along with Future Goten was killed by Goku Black, after Black had admitted to killing her and Goten to Goku, Goku gets extremely angered and begins fighting aggressively at Black to avenge his wife and younger son's deaths.

=== In Dragon Ball GT and other media ===
Chi-Chi plays a minor role in the Dragon Ball GT series. She mostly associates with Bulma and Videl, while also supporting her family in times of crisis. Goku is turned into a child by elder Emperor Pilaf's accidental wish at the beginning of the series, which frustrates her, but she still cares for him deeply. Chi-Chi, along with nearly the entire population on Earth, is later possessed by Baby, but later cured with the sacred water. She is last seen with Goku, when he says goodbye to everyone and departs the mortal world with Shenron.

Chi-Chi usually appears as a non-playable character in cut scenes or referenced in dialogue for most Dragon Ball video games. She is a support-type character for Goku and Gohan in Dragon Ball Z: Harukanaru Densetsu. Chi-Chi is a playable character in 2006's Super Dragon Ball Z; her appearance is derived from her time as a competitor at the 23rd Tenka'ichi Budôkai martial arts tournament. The child version of Chi-Chi is playable in Dragon Ball Z: Budokai Tenkaichi 3, while both adult and youth versions are playable in Dragon Ball Z: Dokkan Battle. She appears as an enemy character in Dragon Ball: Shenron no Nazo, Dragon Ball Z: Super Gokuden: Kakusei-Hen, Dragon Ball Z: Goku Hishōden and Dragon Ball: Origins. In Dragon Ball Z: Kakarot, Chi-Chi appears as one of several cooks that can cook meals for the playable characters using various recipes and ingredients acquired through gameplay.

In the live-action film Dragonball Evolution, Chi-Chi and Goku (played by Justin Chatwin) are high-school classmates; she encounters him and Bulma (played by Emmy Rossum) as their quest for the Dragon Balls intertwines with the competitive martial arts world she is active in. At one point, Mai (played by Eriko Tamura) morphs into an evil duplicate of Chi Chi, resulting in a fight scene between her and the real Chi-Chi.

== Reception ==
Chi-Chi is a somewhat divisive character who is disliked by a section of the Dragon Ball franchise's audience. Some commentators believed that the character had potential based on her early appearances as she was originally depicted as a tough but angry female fighter, but she was later developed as a stereotypical housewife, overprotective mother, and nagging woman archetype instead. Megan Peters from Comicbook.com described Chi-Chi as "misunderstood", while Monique Jones from Syfy identified the cause of the character's negative reception to Toriyama's lack of interest in the proper character development of certain DBZ women of the franchise, and argued that she deserved to be better written. She has been cited as a responsible adult and empowered female character who introduces a sense of maturity to her family dynamics and to the franchise, despite also being criticized for fighting only to keep both her husband and son out of failing normal lives, rather than allying herself with her family to help fight the threats of the world. In 2016, Chi-Chi was voted third cutest Chinese girl in anime and video games (out of twenty) with seventy-three votes by Japanese fans in a survey conducted by Goo Ranking, a fan poll site.

Chi-Chi is a popular subject for cosplay activities by Dragon Ball fandom.

Her original appearance as a child wearing a revealing two piece swimsuit costume has been scrutinized by some commentators for not being age appropriate.
