= Red Ribbon Army =

Faction in Dragon Ball

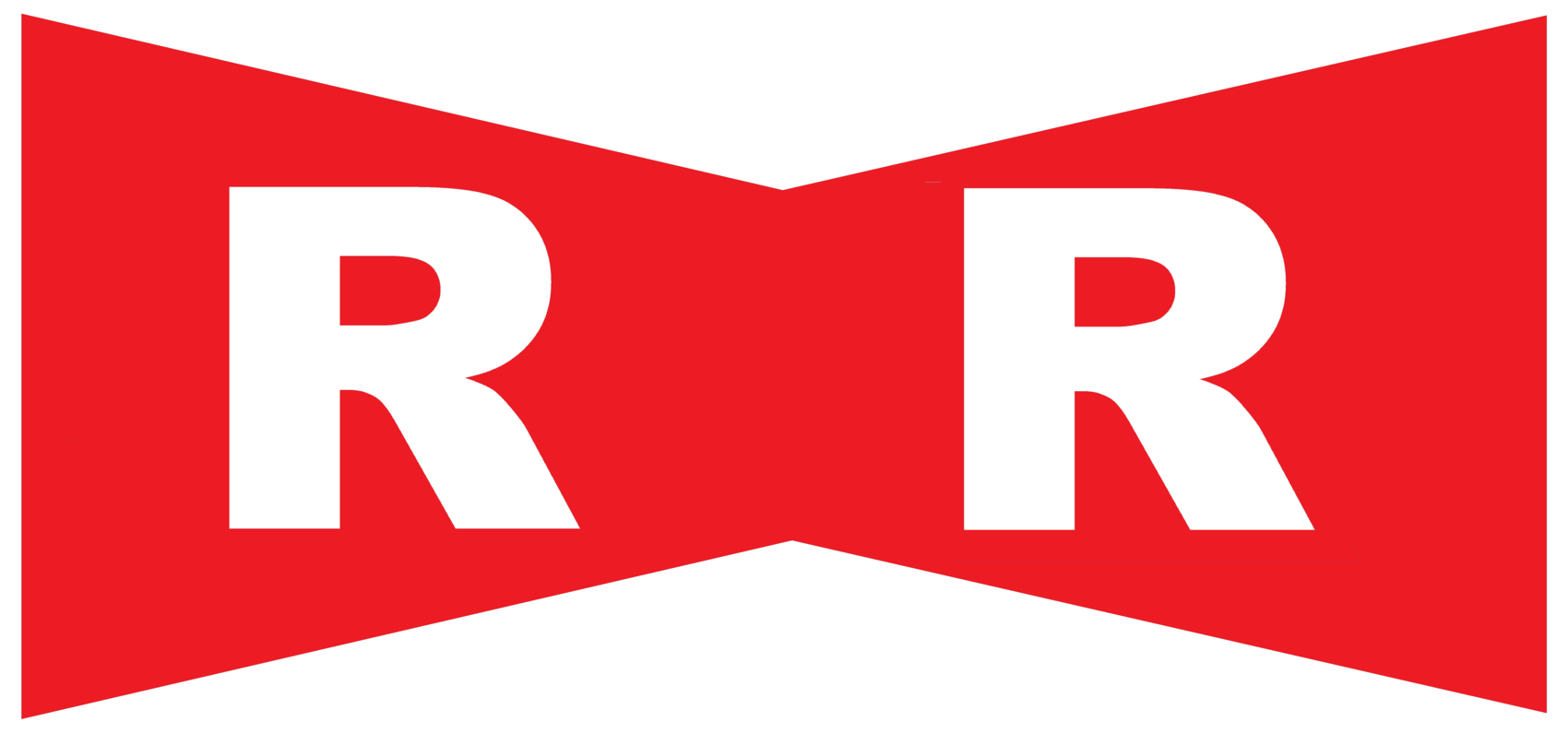

Publication information
- Publisher: Shueisha
- First appearance: Dragon Ball chapter 55: "The Red Ribbon (A Red Ribbon)", December 1985 (Weekly Shōnen Jump 1985)
- Created by: Akira Toriyama

In-story information
- Base(s): Red Ribbon Army Headquarters (Dragon Ball); Doctor Gero's laboratory (Dragon Ball Z); Red Pharmaceuticals' base (Dragon Ball Super: Super Hero)
- Leader(s): Commander Red (Dragon Ball); Magenta (Dragon Ball Super)
- Member(s): Staff Officer Black; General Blue; General White; Colonel Silver; Doctor Gero; Doctor Hedo; Carmine; Red Ribbon Androids

The Red Ribbon Army (レッドリボン軍, Reddo Ribon Gun) is a fictional antagonistic faction featured in Akira Toriyama's Dragon Ball anime and manga series. The many operatives of the Red Ribbon Army, led by Commander Red (レッド総帥, Reddo-Sōsui), serve as opponents for series protagonist Goku during his second quest for the Dragon Balls. In the aftermath of the Red Ribbon Army's defeat by Goku, a surviving member known as Doctor Gero continues the group's legacy and creates a series of powerful artificial humanoids known as Androids as part of his vendetta against Goku.

The group was generally well-received by reviewers. Commentators noted that the Red Ribbon Army arc, in which the group is presented as the first legitimate threat to Goku, marked a shift to a darker tone for the series and was a notable example of antiquated or politically incorrect attitudes towards real-world stereotypes and tropes in Japanese anime. Some of the group's members, including the Red Ribbon Androids, who appear as recurring villains in the franchise, have left a lasting impression on popular culture and have received commentary from media outlets.

== Conception and creation ==
Dragon Ball series creator Akira Toriyama drew inspiration for the military organization, particularly its Muscle Tower (マッスルタワー, Massuru Tawā) base, from the video game Spartan X (known as Kung-Fu Master internationally), in which enemies tend to spawn at a rapid rate while the player character ascends a tower; the game itself was based on two Hong Kong martial arts films, Jackie Chan's Wheels on Meals (known as Spartan X in Japan) and Bruce Lee's Game of Death. Some of the Red Ribbon Army members wear uniforms reminiscent of the Hitler Youth, the youth organisation of the Nazi Party in Nazi Germany, albeit without their signature swastika armbands.

One of the group's major characters, General Blue (ブルー将軍, Burū-Shōgun), is coded as a stereotypically homosexual character, and is similar in concept to the Sturmabteilung co-founder Ernst Röhm. Blue's Japanese voice actor, Toshio Furukawa said it was a difficult role to play due to the character's sexuality. The North American English releases of the manga by Viz Media edited the lips of Adjutant Black (ブラック参謀, Burakku-Sanbō), Staff Officer Black in English anime, by shading them in; D.F. Smith from IGN remarked that the character is a "ridiculous caricature of a black man".

Toriyama created Androids 17 and 18 after Kazuhiko Torishima, his former editor, expressed his disappointment with Androids 19 and 20 being depicted as the villains of the Android Saga arc. When Torishima complained about the youthful duo as well after they were incorporated into the story, Toriyama decided to develop and introduce Cell.

It was decided that the Red Ribbon Army would return as the main antagonistic force in the film Dragon Ball Super: Super Hero, with new characters serving as the driving collective behind its revival. On bringing back the Red Ribbon Army, producer Akio Iyoku said that bringing the organization back as the main villains would be interesting for the story, as an organized group of people who band together against the heroes of the Dragon Ball series would have their own differing agendas and personal motivations in doing so. He also said that there could be something going on with the organization's new Android creations.

== Members ==
The Red Ribbon Army's membership comprises humans, anthropomorphic animals, monsters, and Androids. Its hierarchy is organized like a pyramid structure: its supreme leader is Commander Red, followed by his second in command and adjutant Staff Officer Black, who is in turn followed by commanding officers such as General Blue, and so on. Doctor Gero, creator of the Red Ribbon Androids and Cell, is the chief scientist of the Red Ribbon Army.^{[ch. 335]} The organization functions as a military dictatorship where orders from a superior officer are absolute, but each member may conduct themselves according to their respective ambitions.

Goku's protracted struggle with the Red Ribbon Army begins when he resumes his search for his Grandfather's Dragon Ball following the conclusion of a martial arts tournament he participated in. At the same time, Commander Red directs his forces to raid several settlements throughout the world in search of the Dragon Balls, ostensibly on a quest for world domination. Goku initially encounters and defeats Colonel Silver (シルバー大佐, Shirubā-Taisa) and his subordinates. Silver is later sentenced to death by Red for losing to a little boy.^{[ch. 55, 56]}

Though its leadership believes that Silver's defeat was an anomaly, Goku is increasingly seen as a genuine threat when he manages to defeat the forces under General White (ホワイト将軍, Howaito-Shōgun) in their northern stronghold known as Muscle Tower. General White's forces include the android brute Sergeant Metallic (メタリック軍曹, Metarriku-Gunsō; "Full Metal Jacket" in Viz's English manga and "Major Metallitron" in the English anime), the ninja Sergeant Major Purple (ムラサキ曹長, Murasaki-Sōchō; simply "Murasaki" in the English anime) and his four identical brothers, and the large extraterrestrial monster Buyon (ブヨン; "Jiggler" in Viz's English manga).^{[ch. 58, 60, 62, 64]} Other members include Colonel Yellow (イエロー大佐, Ierō-Taisa; "Captain Yellow" in the English anime), an anthropomorphic tiger whom Goku defeated when arriving at the land of Korin; and Colonel Violet (バイオレット大佐, Baioretto-Taisa), the only known female operative of the army.^{[ch. 84, 93]} A General Copper (カッパ将軍, Kappa-Shōgun) and the Brown (ブラウン, Buraun) Corps are mentioned in passing, but are never seen.^{[ch. 93]} The Red Ribbon Army occasionally recruits hired help to further their objectives, such as the assassin Mercenary Tao, and the anime-exclusive thief Husky (ハスキー, Hasukī).

During the Commander Red Saga, Black eventually discovers that Red's motivation to obtain the Dragon Balls in a bid for world domination is a ruse; Red, an exceedingly short man, secretly covets the power of the Dragon Balls to wish himself taller.^{[ch. 95]} Black turns on Red and attempts to take command of the army and rename it the "Black Ribbon Army", only to be killed by Goku after he wipes out most of the remaining Red Ribbon forces.^{[ch. 95, 96]} Following the downfall of the organization, Doctor Gero continues his research and development work on his line of Android operatives to seek revenge against Goku.

=== General Blue ===
General Blue (ブルー将軍, Burū-Shōgun) is the titular villain of the General Blue Saga arc in the original Dragon Ball series. One of the Red Ribbon Army's leaders and, seemingly, its most powerful member, Blue has special telekinetic abilities that allow him to paralyze others and control objects.^{[ch. 77, 80]} He is a neat freak, and when he does not enjoy Bulma's attempts at seduction, she states that he is gay.^{[ch. 76]} He manages to steal the Dragon Radar during their final encounter; after returning to the army's headquarters, however, he is set to be executed for not obtaining any of the Dragon Balls after multiple failures.^{[ch. 81, 85]} He is allowed to fight the hitman Mercenary Tao to redeem himself, though Tao easily kills Blue using only his tongue.^{[ch. 85]} He is voiced by Toshio Furukawa in Japanese, and Sonny Strait in the Funimation dub.

=== Mercenary Tao ===
Tao Pai Pai (桃白白(タオパイパイ)), Mercenary Tao or General Tao in English anime dubs, is a hitman hired by the Red Ribbon Army to deal with Goku. He is the younger brother of Master Shen, or Crane Hermit (鶴仙人, Tsuru-Sen'nin), the lifelong rival of Master Roshi.^{[ch. 120]} He wears a custom-made pink gi with the kanji for "kill" (殺, satsu) on the front and the English phrase "KILL YOU!" on the back. He is first introduced in the series by being hired by the Red Ribbon Army to take out Goku and retrieve the Dragon Balls he possesses.^{[ch. 85]} He murders General Blue with only his tongue, slew Bora the guardian of Korin Tower with his own spear, and seemingly kills Goku.^{[ch. 85, 87]} After succeeding in the initial battle and collecting most of the Dragon Balls in Goku's possession, Goku challenges him again with his newfound power from Korin.^{[ch. 90]} He gets caught in the explosion of his own grenade and is assumed dead. Master Shen later enters his disciples Tien Shinhan and Chiaotzu in the 22nd World Martial Arts Tournament, and attempts to avenge his brother by ordering his disciples to hurt and kill Goku and Master Roshi's other students.^{[ch. 92, 113, 120]} It is later revealed that Tao survived and was modified into a cyborg using all the money he gained from his previous assassination jobs.^{[ch. 168]} He enters the 23rd World Martial Arts Tournament with the support of Master Shen. Still, he is easily defeated by his brother's former student Tien Shinhan.^{[ch. 168, 170]} In the anime, Tao makes further appearances in filler episodes of Dragon Ball Z during its fifth season.

In Japanese, he is voiced by Chikao Ōtsuka in Dragon Ball and Yukimasa Kishino in Dragon Ball Z. In the Ocean dub, he is voiced by Scott McNeil, while in the Funimation dub, he is voiced by Kent Williams, who also voiced Dr. Gero.

=== Red Ribbon Androids ===
==== Android 8 ====
Android 8 (人造人間8号, Jinzōningen Hachi-gō; "Artificial Human #8") or Mechanical Man No. 8, is the first Red Ribbon Android operative seen in the series. Although he is deployed against Goku as a weapon, Android 8 turns out to be kindhearted and dislikes fighting; he befriends Goku, defects from the Red Ribbon Army, and later lives peacefully with the locals of Jingle Village (ジングル村, Jinguru Mura) and adopts the alias 8-Man (ハッチャン, "Hacchan") ("Eighter" in the anime) as suggested by Goku. Android 8 is seen towards the end of the original manga series, giving energy for Goku's Genki-Dama to destroy Majin Buu.^{[ch. 63, 67, 515]} An alternate future timeline counterpart of Android 8 makes a cameo appearance in Dragon Ball Super.

In the Dragon Ball anime, Android 8's creator is revealed to be Doctor Frappe (フラッペ博士, Furappe Hakase). Later supplementary material suggests that Frappe and Gero developed the Red Ribbon Androids together as colleagues.

Android 8 is voiced by Shōzō Iizuka in Japanese, Dale Wilson in the Ocean dub, and Mike McFarland in the Funimation dub.

==== Doctor Gero ====
Doctor Gero (ドクター・ゲロ, Dokutā Gero) does not appear in the original Red Ribbon Army story arc, and is retroactively linked to the group when his motivation of revenge against Goku for the organization's downfall is revealed in the Android Saga arc. After creating a more advanced series of Red Ribbon Androids, he eventually implants his own brain into a replica of his body. He calls himself Android 20 (人造人間20号, Jinzōningen Ni Jū Gō; lit. 'Artificial Human #20').^{[ch. 348]} He is initially encountered by Yamcha, who is nearly killed when Gero impales his chest with a hand and absorbs Yamcha's chi using a small device on his hand. Gero later flees back to his laboratory and releases Androids 17 and 18 to fend off Goku's associates, but 17 turns on his creator and murders him following a brief altercation.^{[ch. 349, 350]}

Doctor Gero is voiced by Kōji Yada in Japanese, Brian Dobson in the Ocean dub, and Kent Williams in the Funimation dub, who also voiced Mercenary Tao.

==== Android 19 ====
Android 19 (人造人間19号, Jinzōningen Jū Kyū Gō; lit. 'Artificial Human #19') is a round, pale, fully mechanical android and the most loyal of Gero's creations. Like Gero's Android form, 19 can absorb others' energy.^{[ch. 341, 345]} During an attack on Goku and his associates, the Dragon Team, 19 successfully drains Goku of his energy. At the same time, he is incapacitated by his heart virus condition, but is destroyed by Vegeta afterwards. Gero retreats to his laboratory in response.^{[ch. 342, 344]}

Android 19 is voiced by Yukitoshi Hori in Japanese media, Cathy Weseluck in the Ocean dub, Phillip Wilburn in the Funimation dub, and Todd Haberkorn in the Dragon Ball Z Kai dub.

==== Android 17 ====
Android 17 (人造人間17号, Jinzōningen Jū Nana Gō; lit. 'Artificial Human #17') is a Red Ribbon Android created by Doctor Gero. Along with his sister Android 18, 17 is released by Doctor Gero as a last resort to fend off Goku's associates, but he turns on Gero and kills him instead.^{[ch. 349, 350]} They continue to search for Goku, but he is later absorbed by Cell.^{[ch. 372]} He is brought back to life when those killed by Cell are revived with the Dragon Balls. By the events of Dragon Ball Super, 17 works as a forest ranger on a remote island filled with rare animals. It is revealed in Super that he is married and has three children, two of whom are adopted. He is recruited by Team Universe 7 for the Tournament of Power, where he secured victory on their behalf. Wishing upon the tournament prize, the Super Dragon Balls, he asks for all the universes erased during the tournament to be restored.

Akira Toriyama came up with 17 and 18 after his editor at the time, Kazuhiko Torishima, expressed his displeasure with Androids 19 and 20 as the intended arc villains shortly after their debut. 17's brief appearance during the Boo arc was originally intended to be Lunch, who is not otherwise seen during the second half of the manga. Toriyama revealed Android 17's real name as Lapis (ラピス, Rapisu) in 2014.

Shigeru Nakahara voices Android 17 in all Japanese media. In the English Funimation dub, 17 is voiced by Chuck Huber. Huber thought of Android 17 as his biggest role since "nobody liked Garlic Jr. as much as they liked Android 17." Huber considered the role his easiest and a "voice actor vacation", as under the direction of Christopher Sabat he did not have to put on a voice and was advised to be calmer in his dialect. Huber personally found the character to be a "giant jerk," though he liked 17 for the characteristic.

==== Android 18 ====
Android 18 (人造人間18号, Jinzōningen Jū Hachi Gō; lit. 'Artificial Human #18') is the sister of Android 17.^{[ch. 351]} After being released, she travels with Androids 16 and 17 to find and kill Goku; however, they are interrupted by Cell and the Dragon Team several times. She and 17 are eventually absorbed by Cell, but later, during the Cell Games, a hard blow from Gohan causes Cell to regurgitate her. Although Krillin is unable to wish for her to be turned into a human, he can have her self-destruct device removed.^{[ch. 418]} She settles down with Krillin. At some point, they have a daughter named Marron (マーロン, Māron).^{[ch. 426, 431]} 18 continues to make recurring appearances as a secondary character, and later fights for Team Universe 7 in the Tournament Of Power arc.

==== Android 16 ====
Android 16 (人造人間16号, Jinzōningen Jū Roku Gō; lit. 'Artificial Human #16') is a large, fully mechanical android modeled after Gero's son Gevo (ゲボ, Gebo), a high-ranking soldier in the Red Ribbon Army who died from an enemy bullet in an undisclosed battle. 16 is deemed a failure by Gero, and is deactivated until Android 18 reactivates and releases him.^{[ch. 350, 351]} 16 processes a sophisticated mechanism to sense and track power levels in real time, a feature both 17 and 18 lack.^{[ch. 362]} Unlike his Android companions, 16 does not take pleasure in fighting others. It is fully committed to following its programmed orders: to search for and kill Goku. Despite his large and cold appearance, 16 is very gentle and friendly, similar to Android 8. 16 also has an appreciation for humanity and nature, and views Cell as an evil that serves to destroy both. While trying to protect Android 17 and 18 from Cell, he is badly damaged,^{[ch. 371–373]} though Bulma and her father later repair him.^{[ch. 394]} After he is repaired, he temporarily sets aside his orders to kill Goku to focus on the fight against Cell. Like 17 and 18, 16 was designed to self-destruct, but the device was removed during repair. This is made known only when 16 tries to destroy Cell using his self-destruction mechanism, with Cell retaliating and destroying him.^{[ch. 406]} However, his head and consciousness survive, but later is crushed by Cell, which pushes Gohan over the edge to unleash the Super Saiyan 2 form, the necessary power level to overcome Cell.^{[ch. 407, 408]}

Android 16 is voiced by Hikaru Midorikawa in Japanese media, Scott McNeil in the Ocean dub, and Jeremy Inman in the Funimation dub.

==== Cell ====
Cell (セル, Seru) is Doctor Gero's ultimate creation, referred to as a "Bio-Android". He is designed to evolve into the "perfect" being. The creature is completed at a later date and unleashed by Gero's supercomputer, intended as a fail-safe that collects data in the background. Before the release of Dragon Ball FighterZ, Cell was sometimes referred to as "Android 21".

==== Android 21 ====
Android 21 (人造人間21号, Jinzōningen Nijūichi-Gō; lit. 'Artificial Human #21') is a character originally introduced within the main story mode of the video game Dragon Ball FighterZ. She is initially presented as a mysterious scientist who works for the Red Ribbon Army and is somehow connected to a mysterious anomaly that renders various Dragon Ball series characters powerless, as well as to the appearance of hostile cloned versions of those characters. Her backstory and true nature are gradually revealed through the progression of the game's narrative, and are featured as the final boss in each of the game's three story arcs.

As she possesses the genetic material of various powerful characters in the series, much like Cell, Android 21 is depicted as a very formidable Bio-Android with superhuman strength, endurance, and speed. She is noted to have two forms with distinct personalities: one being her human form with a benevolent personality, and the other is her true form, which is reminiscent of Majin Buu, with a similar pink skin palette and style of clothing, as well as a malevolent personality whose sole desire is to consume all life. Android 21 can fly and create energy beams using her ki. Like Buu, Android 21 can transform objects or living things by shooting an energy beam at them, typically rendering them into confectionery or other sweet foods to feed her ravenous hunger. She is also capable of copying and emulating the abilities and powers of other characters by stabbing her targets with an energy blade projected from her hand. She is unlocked as a playable character for all game modes once the story mode is completed. A second playable version of Android 21, using her human design and her lab coat attire, was added via downloadable content in February 2022.

Android 21 and the cloned enemy characters from Dragon Ball FighterZ are featured in the animated opening credits of the Super Dragon Ball Heroes: World Mission update for the Dragon Ball Heroes digital card game, but have yet to appear in the promotional anime itself. She appears in other video games such as Super Dragon Ball Heroes, Dragon Ball Z: Dokkan Battle, Dragon Ball Legends, Dragon Ball Xenoverse 2, and Dragon Ball Z: Kakarot.

The 2022 film Dragon Ball Super: Super Hero reveals that Android 21's human base is Vomi (ヴォミ), the wife of Dr. Gero and the mother of Gevo, the model for Android 16's design. Vomi is briefly sighted during a media presentation by senior members of the reconstituted Red Ribbon Army as they attempt to recruit her surviving grandson, Dr. Hedo.

==== Gamma 1 & 2 ====
Gamma 1 (ガンマ1号, Ganma Ichigō) and Gamma 2 (ガンマ2号, Ganma Nigō) are two androids created by the reformed Red Ribbon Army that appear as secondary antagonists in the 2022 film Dragon Ball Super: Super Hero. The army conceives them as an even more powerful new series of androids, designed by Doctor Hedo in his own image. Despite their flamboyant, often ridiculous showmanship, they are powerful and dedicated fighters with a strong sense of justice, albeit misguided by their creators. They are supposed to be used as a pretense for the organization to paint itself as a heroic figure while it seeks revenge against Goku. Each of them wields special ray guns in battle that unleash an array of powerful ki blasts.

Gamma 1 and Gamma 2 are respectively voiced by Hiroshi Kamiya and Mamoru Miyano in Japanese, and by Aleks Le and Zeno Robinson in English.

=== Red Pharmaceuticals ===
Following the deaths of Doctor Gero and Cell, a new reincarnation of the Red Ribbon Army is formed, eager to seek revenge once more on Goku, who, unbeknownst to them, is offworld. They conceal all their operations in a hidden base holographically protected in plain sight, using a pharmaceutical company as a front.

==== Magenta ====
Magenta (マゼンタ, Mazenta) is the primary antagonist of Dragon Ball Super: Super Hero. He is the son of the late Commander Red and resembles the former. He is the presumed head of Red Pharmaceuticals, used as a front for the reformed Red Ribbon Army, where he serves as its new leader. He secretly plots, alongside his assistant Carmine and Doctor Hedo, to seek revenge on Goku and his loved ones for annihilating his father's organization, claiming that Capsule Corporation harbors evil aliens. He is confident about his plans, but like his father, becomes belligerent when faced with the notion of things not going his way.

Magenta is voiced by Volcano Ōta in Japanese and Charles Martinet in English.

==== Doctor Hedo ====
Doctor Hedo (ドクター・ヘド, Dokutā Hedo) is the short, portly genius scientist who is the grandson of the notorious Doctor Gero, who works for the revived Red Ribbon Army under Magenta after breaking free from prison. Unlike his grandfather, he has little desire to carry on Gero's revenge against Goku; he is obsessed with superheroes and seeks to create the ultimate superhero androids, while also seeking research funds from the army. He is responsible for the creation of the army's secret weapon, an even more powerful variant of the original Cell, Cell Max (セルマックス, Seru Makusu). He has an expertise in biology. He has a medical license and is revealed to have injected himself with a serum that protects him from light shock injuries. He is accompanied by his insectoid robot, Hachimaru.

Doctor Hedo is voiced by Miyu Irino in Japanese and Zach Aguilar in English.

==== Carmine ====
Carmine (カーマイン, Kāmain) is the secondary antagonist of Dragon Ball Super: Super Hero, as he is the secretary of Red Pharmaceuticals and Magenta's loyal bodyguard and chauffeur. He has a large pompadour hairstyle and has a habit of combing it. He assists Magenta in rebuilding the Red Ribbon Army in secret and plotting their revenge against Goku and his friends and family. He is incredibly ruthless and cold-blooded in situations, as he enjoys tormenting his enemies and is willing to kidnap and kill children.

Carmine is voiced by Ryota Takeuchi in Japanese and Jason Marnocha in English.

=== In other media ===
Several key members of the Red Ribbon Army appear in the alternate retelling film Dragon Ball: The Path to Power, where they are presented with different character designs. In the film Dragon Ball: Mystical Adventure, General Blue and Sergeant Metallic appear as soldiers in Emperor Chiaotzu's army; Mercenary Tao murders the former in the same manner as the source material. Sergeant Major Purple and General Blue appear in the 1990s remake of the Dr. Slump anime, where they attempt to claim the Dragon Balls from Goku and Arale Norimaki.

The story of Trunks' alternate future, in which Androids 17 and 18 ravage the timeline, is depicted in the 1993 anime TV special Dragon Ball Z: The History of Trunks.

Doctor Gero's death at the hands of Android 17 is retold in the seventh Dragon Ball Z film, which features three of his other creations as antagonists: Androids 13, 14, and 15. Aside from multiple non-canonical licensed video game appearances, the three Androids do not appear in the original manga or anime TV series.

In Dragon Ball GT, Doctor Gero creates a replicant copy of Android 17 along with Doctor Myu in the afterlife, who later merges with the original Android 17 to become the villainous Super 17 (超17号, Chō Jū Nana-Gō).

== Promotion and merchandise ==
The Dragon Ball 30th Anniversary Super History Book, released in 2016, features concept art and sketches for various characters drawn from the series' history. Manga artist Masashi Kishimoto contributed a sketch featuring the Pirate Robot, a minor character from the General Blue Saga arc. Members of the Red Ribbon Army and the later Red Ribbon Androids have appeared in numerous licensed Dragon Ball video games.

== Reception ==
Carl Kimlinger of Anime News Network opined that the Red Ribbon army arc represented the Dragon Ball series at its peak in terms of its tone, a pleasant balance between "the frivolity of early Dragon Ball and the ponderous solemnity of Dragon Ball Z". He found the Red Ribbon Army to be effective villains, as it was first time Goku has faced "real bad guys", as opposed to "goofy Team Rocket-esque wannabes" like the Pilaf Gang. Kimlinger noted that the complete defeat of the Red Ribbon Army would have major implications for the franchise's narrative, as it sets the stage for the Android Saga storyline in Dragon Ball Z. Smith commented that the Red Ribbon Army storyline is indicative of a time period that predates the prevalence of the notion of political correctness in popular media, noting that the concept never gained significant traction in Japanese popular culture by contrast. In his view, some of the antiquated writing and character design for the Red Ribbon Army is "less of a light form of entertainment, and more a throwback '80s cultural artifact"; Smith formed the view that while the series never loses its anthropological or historical interest, storylines like the Red Ribbon Army arc may be challenging for viewers to "just turn your brain off and enjoy it straight".

The individual members and associates of the Red Ribbon Army have received varied receptions. Uonuma Usui from Nobuhiro Watsuki's Rurouni Kenshin manga is modeled after Mercenary Tao; Watsuki stated that Tao made "a strong impression" on him as he was the first villain in the series to defeat Goku. Craig Elvy from Screen Rant said Android 8 is a minor but important influence in Goku's overall character development throughout the series, and drew a link between their interactions early in the series to Goku's consistently merciful attitude towards his enemies as an adult. Android 16 is considered to be the franchise's best villain by Brandon Zachary, who described the character in an article for Comic Book Resources (CBR) as a tragic figure who brings a somber side to the Dragon Ball universe. In a 2004 poll, Japanese fans voted Androids 17 and 18 as the 18th and 10th most popular character in the series respectively. Sheldon Pearce from Complex found both 17 and 18 to be interesting in their own right and gave them high rankings in his list of Dragon Ball Z characters. The fight between 17 and Piccolo is considered to be one of the greatest fights in Dragon Ball Z by David Dennis Jr. from Uproxx.

Conversely, Todd Douglass Jr. felt that collectively, the Red Ribbon Army characters were "hit or miss" for him. Aimee Hart, writing for Anime Feminist, was disturbed by an in-joke conveyed in the anime, which depicts Bulma breaking the fourth wall in an episode to imply that a scene of her being raped by a group of Red Ribbon Army soldiers is censored from publication in the original manga. Both Anthony Gramuglia, writing for CBR, and Aimee Hart considered the homophobic characterization of General Blue to be deeply problematic. Gramuglia is particularly critical of Blue's uniform being styled after that of an organization which persecuted homosexual individuals, as well as the anime adaptation's depiction of Blue as a pedophile, which evokes an offensive stereotype of gay men being sexual predators.
