= Cell games =

Cell games may refer to:

- Cell games (cellular automaton), a discrete model of computation studied in automata theory
- Cell Games (Dragon Ball), a fictional martial arts tournament in Dragon Ball
- Mobile games, video games played on mobile devices, usually mobile phones
