= Dragon Ball Z: Harukanaru Densetsu =

2007 video game

- Developer: BEC
- Publishers: JP/EU: Namco Bandai Games (Note: Released under the Bandai brand name.); NA/AU: Atari
- Series: Dragon Ball
- Platform: Nintendo DS
- Release: JP: March 21, 2007; NA: June 5, 2007; PAL: August 31, 2007
- Genre: Role-playing
- Modes: Single-player, multiplayer

Dragon Ball Z: Harukanaru Densetsu, known as Dragon Ball Z: Harukanaru Goku Densetsu (ドラゴンボールZ 遥かなる悟空伝説, Doragon Bōru Z Harukanaru Gokū Densetsu) in Japan and Dragon Ball Z: Goku Densetsu in Europe, is a card based role-playing video game for the Nintendo DS. The game takes place from the beginning of the Saiyan Saga to the end of the Cell Saga. Players choose from one of the four main character, Goku, Gohan, Piccolo, and Vegeta. Other characters also appear, but only as either enemies or support cards.

== Gameplay ==
Each mission is usually broken down into a few key objectives, each mission taking anywhere from 5 to 30 minutes to complete. The game is based on levels; the more fights the player wins, the more experience they receive, which in turn makes their attacks stronger. In battle, the highest attack power of a card wins; however, players can also combine cards to create combination effects. For example, if a player had 3 cards with a power rating of 7, the cards can combine these to create a 21 power card. Defense may also be also combined in the same way.

There are several types of cards, each having a battle and map effect. In battle, Attack Cards attack the opponent with a melee attack or energy wave, Training Cards increase defense power, Power Cards increase the power number on the other cards, Item Cards allow the player to use items picked up on the board, Escape Cards allow the player to leave random encounter battles (not boss battles), Reverse Cards allow a player to switch the stats between your card and your opponent's, Support Cards allow an ally such as Tien, Yamcha, Yajirobe or Krillin to attack, and Z Cards allow the player to choose one of the other seven actions.

Each of the eight cards has a different effect on the board, known as the map in the game. PLayers move around the game in a board game like manner. The story is the Saiyan-Cell Sagas, and is split in scenarios divided up by the four characters.

Multiplayer Mode consists of a full-fledged four-player battle on a map in Wireless Play and a Vegeta-vs.-Goku 2 two player match on Download Play.

== Reception ==
Reception

Aggregate scores
Aggregator	Score
GameRankings	58.37%
Metacritic	57/100

Review scores
Publication	Score
GameSpot	5.6/10
GamesRadar+	2/5
GameZone	5.3/10
IGN	7.5/10
Nintendo Life	5/10
3DJuegos	7.0/10
Vandal	6.3/10

Dragon Ball Z: Harukanaru Densetsu received generally mixed reviews from critics. It holds a score of 57 out of 100 on Metacritic and 58.37% on GameRankings.
