= Dragon Ball Z season 4 =

Dragon Ball Z
- Season 4
- North American DVD release cover featuring Future Trunks
- No. of episodes: 32

Release
- Original network: Fuji Television
- Original release: September 18, 1991 – May 13, 1992

Season chronology
- ← Previous; Season 3 Next → Season 5

The fourth season of the Dragon Ball Z anime series contains the Garlic Jr., Future Trunks, and the Androids arcs, which comprises Part 1 of the Cell Saga. The episodes are produced by Toei Animation, and are based on the final 26 volumes of the Dragon Ball manga series by Akira Toriyama.

The 32-episode season originally ran from September 1991 to May 1992 in Japan on Fuji Television. The first English airing of the series was on Cartoon Network's Toonami block, where Funimation Entertainment's dub of the series ran from November 1999 to October 2000.

Funimation released the season in a box set on February 19, 2008, and in June 2009, announced that they would be re-releasing Dragon Ball Z in a new seven volume set called the "Dragon Boxes". Based on the original series masters with frame-by-frame restoration, the first set was released November 10, 2009.

== English dub production ==
Beginning with the episode "Goku's Special Technique", the Vancouver-based Ocean Productions began their own alternate English dub for the remainder of the series, in association with French company AB Groupe. This dub used the same scripts and episode titles as the concurrent Funimation dub. Ocean's actors had previously voiced the original Funimation/Saban Entertainment dub of the first two seasons, which aired between September 1996 and May 1998 on first-run syndication. In 1999, they had been replaced for the third season by Funimation's new Dallas-based voice talent. Most of the original Ocean actors returned to their roles, however, the Saban Entertainment background score from the first two seasons was not used, instead being replaced by recycled music from the 1994 Ruby-Spears Mega Man cartoon, which Ocean was involved with. The composers of the recycled Mega Man music, Tom Keenlyside and John Mitchell, also composed a brand new theme song, which replaced Saban's "Rock the Dragon" theme song from the first two seasons. Parts of the dub were recorded at Westwood Studios instead of Ocean Studios, which has led to some fans referring to this as the "Westwood dub", in order to distinguish it from the earlier Ocean-voiced dub of the first two seasons. This alternate dub aired, starting April 2, 2001, on the British version of Toonami in the early 2000s, and later Canada's YTV, which kept using the Funimation dub up until the Cell Games episodes of Season 6. The American version of Toonami and Australia's Network 10 continued to air Funimation's Dallas-voiced dub.

== Episode list ==
No. overall	Initial dub no.	Translated title/Funimation's dub title Original Japanese title	Directed by	Written by	Animation directed by	Original release date	English air date
108	93	"Terrible Happenings in Heaven!! Garlic Jr. to Become Kami!?" / "The Heavens Tremble"; Transliteration: "Tenkai ga Taihen da!! Gārikku Junia ga Kami ni Naru!?" (Japanese: 天界が大変だ!!ガーリックJrが神になる!?)	Yoshihiro Ueda	Katsuyuki Sumisawa	Masayuki Uchiyama	September 18, 1991	April 8, 2000
Even with Goku survived Namek's destruction and not back yet, the Earth has been very peaceful as Gohan fishes and Krillin dates a young girl named Maron. However, the peace will be disturbed because an old enemy has escaped from his dark prison after the defeat by Gohan's rage attack- Garlic Jr!
109	94	"Black Mist of Terror...!! Everyone Turns Demonic" / "Black Fog of Terror"; Transliteration: "Kyōfu no Kuroi Kiri...!! Minna Mazoku ni Natchatta" (Japanese: 恐怖の黒い霧...!!みんな魔族になっちゃった)	Yamauchi Shigeyasu	Katsuyuki Sumisawa	Kazuya Hisada	September 25, 1991	April 15, 2000
Garlic Jr. and his henchmen, the Spice Boys, have infiltrated Kami's Lookout and have captured Kami and Mr. Popo. With Garlic Jr. in control, he releases his father's Black Water Mist- a vapor that unlocks any evil within a person, becoming a demon. Can anyone withstand the mist's power?
110	95	"The Heavenly Realm is the Battlefield!! Piccolo Becomes Devilish Again..." / "Battle in Kami's Lookout"; Transliteration: "Tenkai ga Senjō da!! Pikkoro ga Mazoku ni Gyaku Modori..." (Japanese: 天界が戦場だ!!ピッコロが魔族に逆戻り...)	Mitsuo Hashimoto	Katsuyuki Sumisawa	Yukio Ebisawa	October 2, 1991	April 22, 2000
With their friends infected by the Black Water Mist and the knowledge of Garlic Jr.'s return, Gohan and Krillin head towards the Lookout to get the Sacred Water, but it's going to be tricky with Garlic Jr. beating them to the punch. Meanwhile, Piccolo handles the Spice Boys and the others, but will he too be infected by the mist?
111	96	"Direct Confrontation with Piccolo!! An Angry Masenko in the Heavenly Realm" / "Fight with Piccolo"; Transliteration: "Pikkoro to Kyokusetsu Taiketsu!! Tenkai ni Ikari no Masenkō" (Japanese: ピッコロと直接対決!!天界に怒りの魔せん光)	Kazuhito Kikuchi	Katsuyuki Sumisawa	Mitsuo Shindō	October 9, 1991	April 29, 2000
Piccolo has been infected by the Black Water Mist too, as he now follows Garlic Jr. As the immortal demon relaxes, Mustard and Salt have their fun with Earth's last heroes. Gohan gets beaten up by Salt and is about to be finished off when Krillin steps in and takes the blast, badly injuring him. Furious, Gohan easily kills both Salt and Mustard with his powerful Masenko. But as the young Saiyan then turns to confront Garlic Jr. and the last remaining Spice Boys, Piccolo attacks Gohan.
112	97	"Retrieve Everyone's Minds!! The Ultra Holy Water Resting in the Temple" / "Call for Restoration"; Transliteration: "Minna no Kokoro o Torimodose!! Shinden ni Nemuru Chō Shinsui" (Japanese: みんなの心を取り戻せ!!神殿に眠る超神水)	Jun'ichi Fujise	Katsuyuki Sumisawa	Minoru Maeda	October 16, 1991	May 6, 2000
Gohan is powerless against the infected Piccolo. As Piccolo closes in for the kill, despite his attempts to free Kami and Mr. Popo from Garlic Jr.'s glass bottles, Krillin jumps in front of him (pushing Gohan out of the way to save him), and gets bitten (into unconsciousness and later turning into a demon) by Piccolo. Now Gohan seems to be the only hero and last hope left against his now infected friends, and as he is beaten nearly to death, the battle is almost over for him... or is it?
113	98	"Can't Wait Until Morning!! Kami-sama Determines a Suicidal Course of Action" / "Suicidal Course"; Transliteration: "Asa made Matenai!! Kamisama no Kakugo o Kimeta Kesshikō" (Japanese: 朝まで待てない!!神様の覚悟をきめた決死行)	Yoshihiro Ueda	Katsuyuki Sumisawa	Masayuki Uchiyama	October 23, 1991	May 13, 2000
To Gohan's surprise, Piccolo and Krillin fooled Garlic Jr., for they were not infected by the Black Water Mist, and they instead free Kami and Mr. Popo, who then make their way toward the seven air currents to spread the Sacred Water, but Kami could lose his life. Will he make it time, and will the others handle Garlic Jr.'s power increase with the Makyo Star?
114	99	"A Battle of Extreme Measures!! Kami-sama Breaks the Covenant" / "Extreme Measures"; Transliteration: "Chō Kageki ni Shōbu da!! Okite Yaburi no Kamisama" (Japanese: 超過激に勝負だ!!掟やぶりの神様)	Yamauchi Shigeyasu	Katsuyuki Sumisawa	Kazuya Hisada	October 30, 1991	May 20, 2000
Gohan, Krillin, and Piccolo do their best against Garlic Jr and the remaining Spice Boys, with the Makyo Star powering them up, but is it enough? Meanwhile, Kami and Mr. Popo try to pour the Sacred Water, but the former guardians won't allow it, and they drain Kami's lifeforce... as well as Piccolo's.
115	100	"The Ultra Holy Water Worked!! The World Awakens from Its Nightmare" / "The World Awakens"; Transliteration: "Kiita ze Chō Shinsui!! Sekai ga Akumu kara Sameta" (Japanese: 効いたぜ超神水!!世界が悪夢からさめた)	Mitsuo Hashimoto	Katsuyuki Sumisawa	Yukio Ebisawa	November 6, 1991	May 27, 2000
With Piccolo down, Gohan fights the powered up Garlic Jr., but can he really defeat an immortal demon? Meanwhile, Kami distracts the former guardians by using himself as bait so Mr. Popo can spread the Sacred Water.
116	101	"Gohan's Brief Chance for Victory!! Blast the Makyo World..." / "Brief Chance for Victory"; Transliteration: "Gohan ni Isshun no Shōki!! Ano Makyōsei o Ute..." (Japanese: 悟飯に一瞬の勝機!!あの魔凶星を撃て...)	Kazuhito Kikuchi	Katsuyuki Sumisawa	Mitsuo Shindō	November 13, 1991	May 27, 2000
With his plan in ruins, an enraged Garlic Jr. opens up the Dead Zone to finish off the others once and for all. With Kami and Mr. Popo spared, Piccolo is back with a plan: destroy the Makyo Star. But can only Gohan do it even if it puts his friends at risk of his life?
117	102	"You're My Guy... Kuririn – A 101st Proposal" / "Krillin's Proposal"; Transliteration: "Otoko da nē...Kuririn Hyakuikkaime no Puropōzu" (Japanese: 男だねェ...クリリン101回目のプロポーズ)	Daisuke Nishio	Aya Matsui	Minoru Maeda	November 20, 1991	September 1, 2000
With Garlic Jr. sealed in the Dead Zone once again, the Earth at peace once again, Krillin and Maron do a little shopping, but then Maron looks at a wedding dress and a house. Krillin thinks that they might get married, but finds that he has a lot to consider.
118	103	"That There is Earth, Papa... The Counter-Attack of Freeza, Father and Son" / "Frieza's Counterattack"; Transliteration: "Are ga Chikyū dayo Papa... Furīza Oyako no Gyakushū" (Japanese: あれが地球だよパパ...フリーザ親子の逆襲)	Yamauchi Shigeyasu	Takao Koyama	Masayuki Uchiyama	November 27, 1991	September 4, 2000
With Mr. Shu as his tutor, Gohan's studies become more intense as he still waits for Goku to come back. However, it looks he won't be the only one coming to Earth, for somehow Frieza is coming to Earth as well.
119	104	"I Will Defeat Freeza... The Mysterious Youth Awaiting Goku" / "The Mysterious Youth"; Transliteration: "Furīza wa Boku ga Taosu... Gokū o Matsu Nazo no Shōnen" (Japanese: フリーザはボクが倒す...悟空を待つ謎の少年)	Yoshihiro Ueda	Aya Matsui	Kazuya Hisada	December 4, 1991	September 5, 2000
Thanks to his father, King Cold, Frieza has survived Namek's explosion and has been repaired as a cyborg. These two tyrants are headed to Earth to exact revenge against Goku. It looks like all hope seems lost as no one can stop these two powerful warriors... or is there?
120	105	"Freeza Halved by a Single Stroke!! Another Super Saiyan" / "Another Super Saiyan?"; Transliteration: "Furīza o Ittō Ryōdan!! Mō Hitori no Sūpā Saiyajin" (Japanese: フリーザを一刃両断!!もう一人の超サイヤ人)	Mitsuo Hashimoto	Takao Koyama	Katsuyoshi Nakatsuru	December 11, 1991	September 6, 2000
As Frieza and King Cold prepare to strike, a mysterious white haired youth armed with a sword comes out of nowhere and challenges them to fight. It looks like this youth has made a grave mistake, or maybe... it's the other way around.
121	106	"Heya!! It's Been a While... Son Goku Returns" / "Welcome Back Goku"; Transliteration: "Ossu!! Hisashiburi... Kaettekita Son Gokū" (Japanese: オッス!!ひさしぶり...帰って来た孫悟空)	Mitsuo Hashimoto; Storyboarded by : Kazuhisa Takenouchi	Hiroshi Toda	Yukio Ebisawa	December 18, 1991	September 7, 2000
The Z Fighters finally arrive to face Frieza only to see the mysterious swordsman becoming a Super Saiyan and defeating Frieza and King Cold with ease. With the threat over, he tells the others Goku will be coming soon, but can he be trusted? What connection does he have with the Saiyan?
122	107	"My Dad is Vegeta... Admissions of the Mysterious Youth" / "Mystery Revealed"; Transliteration: "Boku no Chichi wa Bejīta desu... Nazo no Shōnen no Kokuhaku" (Japanese: ボクの父はベジータです...謎の少年の告白)	Jun'ichi Fujise; Storyboarded by : Kazuhisa Takenouchi	Hiroshi Toda	Tadayoshi Yamamuro	January 8, 1992	September 8, 2000
Goku finally arrives to Earth, but wonders who the mysterious youth really is. The young swordsman asks Goku to speak to him privately. Once he and Goku are out of nearly everyone's earshot, his identity is finally revealed, his name is Trunks, the son of Vegeta and Bulma and he is from the future. He tells Goku of a new threat – in three years, Goku will die of a heart disease, and without Goku, the Z Fighters will be powerless to stop two Androids, from bringing the Earth under their tyrannical rule. He has come to inform them in order to change the future, and gives Goku a special medicine to take when the heart disease strikes him.
123	108	"Goku's New Finishing Technique!? Watch My Instantaneous Movement" / "Goku's Special Technique"; Transliteration: "Gokū no Shin Hissatsu Waza!? Mitekure, Ora no Shunkan Idō" (Japanese: 悟空の新必殺技!?見てくれ、オラの瞬間移動)	Yamauchi Shigeyasu	Hiroshi Toda	Masayuki Uchiyama	January 15, 1992	September 11, 2000 (FUNimation) April 2, 2001 (Ocean)
Goku explains to the others on how he survived Namek's explosion. He also reveals his new instant transmission technique that he learned from the friendly inhabitants of the planet Yardrat.
124	109	"I Will Overcome Goku!! The King of the Saiyan Warrior Race" / "Z Warriors Prepare"; Transliteration: "Koeteyaru...Gokū o!! Sentō Minzoku Saiyajin no Ō" (Japanese: こえてやる...悟空を!!戦闘民族サイヤ人の王)	Kazuhito Kikuchi	Aya Matsui	Minoru Maeda	January 22, 1992	September 12, 2000 (FUNimation) April 3, 2001 (Ocean)
As Goku and Piccolo train with Gohan, Vegeta trains under very high gravity levels in an effort to become a Super Saiyan, but can he survive it?
125	110	"License Mastery? Goku's Newest Trial" / "Goku's Ordeal"; Transliteration: "Menkyo Kaiden? Gokū no Aratanaru Shiren" (Japanese: 免許皆伝？悟空の新たなる試練)	Yoshihiro Ueda	Aya Matsui	Kazuya Hisada	January 29, 1992	September 13, 2000 (FUNimation) April 4, 2001 (Ocean)
Goku and Piccolo stop their training to learn how to drive so Chi-Chi can get a car. They may be powerful fighters, but can they get their licences in time to continue their training and keep Chi-Chi happy?
126	111	"Murderers Who Leave No Trace – Which Ones Are the Artificial Humans!?" / "The Androids Appear"; Transliteration: "Kehai o Motanu Satsujinki Doitsu ga Jinzō Ningen da!?" (Japanese: 気配を持たぬ殺人鬼どいつが人造人間だ!?)	Mitsuo Hashimoto	Hiroshi Toda	Yukio Ebisawa	February 5, 1992	September 14, 2000 (FUNimation) April 5, 2001 (Ocean)
Three years have passed and Goku and the others arrive on Amembo Island, where the Androids 19 and 20 are going to attack as Trunks predicted. Will their training be enough to stop these monsters?
127	112	"The Cold-Blooded No. 20's Hideous Atrocities!! Goku's Super Transformation of Anger" / "A Handy Trick"; Transliteration: "Reiketsu Nijūgō no Akugyaku Hidō!! Gokū – Ikari no Chōhenshin" (Japanese: 冷血20号の悪逆非道!!悟空・怒りの超変身)	Jun'ichi Fujise	Katsuyuki Sumisawa	Tadayoshi Yamamuro	February 12, 1992	September 15, 2000 (FUNimation) April 6, 2001 (Ocean)
Yamcha has found the Androids, but is hanging on by a thread as Goku and the others come to his aid. Krillin brings Yamcha to Bulma with the Senzu Beans while Goku leads the Androids away from the city, but the Androids have a secret ability that only Yamcha knows.
128	113	"Goku's Double-Shock!! Caught Between Illness and Adversary" / "Double Trouble for Goku"; Transliteration: "Gokū, Daburu Shokku!! Yamai to Teki no Hasamiuchi" (Japanese: 悟空、ダブルショック!!病と敵のはさみ撃ち)	Yamauchi Shigeyasu	Hiroshi Toda	Masayuki Uchiyama	February 19, 1992	September 18, 2000 (FUNimation) April 9, 2001 (Ocean)
The fight begins as Goku turns Super Saiyan and fights Android 19. Meanwhile, at Kame House, Maron appears wanting Krillin back. Master Roshi then explains to her the relationship between the Red Ribbon Army and Goku. It looks like Goku has the situation handled, but he discovers 19's absorption technique after firing a Kamehameha. To make matters worse, it looks like something else is weakening him while 19's ready to fight.
129	114	"The Might of Vegeta!! The Blood of a Super Saiyan Awakens" / "Upgrade to Super Saiyan"; Transliteration: "Bejīta Tsuyoshi!! Mezameru Sūpā Saiyajin no Chi" (Japanese: ベジータ強し!!目覚める超サイヤ人の血)	Yoshihiro Ueda	Hiroshi Toda	Takeo Ide	February 26, 1992	September 19, 2000 (FUNimation) April 10, 2001 (Ocean)
It looks like the heart virus Trunks warned about came true after all, but at a bad time for Goku as he is in the clutches of Android 19. Suddenly, Vegeta saves Goku and prepares to fight the Androids and he's got a surprise for everyone.
130	115	"No. 20's Defiant Smile... The Secret of Doctor Gero" / "The Secret of Dr. Gero"; Transliteration: "Nijūgō no Futeki na Warai... Dokutā Gero no Himitsu" (Japanese: 20号の不敵な笑い...ドクターゲロの秘密)	Kazuhito Kikuchi	Hiroshi Toda	Kazuya Hisada	March 4, 1992	September 20, 2000 (FUNimation) April 11, 2001 (Ocean)
Finally becoming a Super Saiyan, Vegeta easily defeats Android 19, but 20 has escaped to come up with a new plan. Vegeta and the others look for the diabolical Android, but it won't be easy.
131	116	"A Reality More Terrifying than the Future!? Trunks' Suspicions" / "More Androids?!"; Transliteration: "Jijitsu wa Mirai yori Osoroshii!? Torankusu no Giwaku" (Japanese: 事実は未来より恐ろしい!?トランクスの疑惑)	Mitsuo Hashimoto	Katsuyuki Sumisawa	Yukio Ebisawa	March 11, 1992	September 21, 2000 (FUNimation) April 12, 2001 (Ocean)
Android 20 grabs Piccolo from behind in order to steal his energy so he can defeat the Z fighters, but Gohan comes to Piccolo's rescue just in time. After eating a Senzu Bean to restore the energy Android 20 stole, Piccolo begins to fight with the Android. Meanwhile, Trunks has returned to the past and has discovered something different about these Androids- he's never seen them before! So where are the Androids he warned Goku about?
132	117	"Give Chase!! The Search for Doctor Gero's Mysterious Laboratory" / "Follow Dr. Gero"; Transliteration: "Tsuigeki!! Dokutā Gero Nazo no Kenkyūjo o Sagashidase" (Japanese: 追撃!!ドクターゲロ謎の研究所を探し出せ)	Yamauchi Shigeyasu	Katsuyuki Sumisawa	Masayuki Uchiyama	March 18, 1992	September 22, 2000 (FUNimation) April 17, 2001 (Ocean)
Bulma arrives on the scene to discover that Android 20 is Dr. Gero himself. The insane scientist fires an energy blast as a smokescreen so he can escape to activate Androids 17 and 18 which sends Bulma flying. After saving his young mother and younger self, Trunks follows Vegeta to stop him from facing the Androids head-on as the others try to find Gero's laboratory before he does, but will they make it?
133	118	"And the Terror Becomes Reality... No. 17 and No. 18 Awaken!!" / "Nightmare Comes True"; Transliteration: "Soshite Kyōfu ga Genjitsu ni... Mezameru Jūnanagō to Jūhachigō!!" (Japanese: そして恐怖が現実に...目覚める17号と18号!!)	Yoshihiro Ueda	Takao Koyama	Tadayoshi Yamamuro	March 25, 1992	September 25, 2000 (FUNimation) April 18, 2001 (Ocean)
Dr. Gero hides on the ground as the Z Warriors are close to finding his secret laboratory, thanks to Bulma, but the mad doctor won't give up so easily. Meanwhile, Goku's condition is starting to get better, but will he recover quickly enough to help his friends?
134	119	"Too Late to Do Anything!? The Ultimate Weapons to Kill Goku" / "Goku's Assassin"; Transliteration: "Subete ga Teokure ka!? Gokū o Korosu Saishū Heiki" (Japanese: すべてが手遅れか!?悟空を殺す最終兵器)	Jun'ichi Fujise	Takao Koyama	Kazuya Hisada	April 1, 1992	September 26, 2000 (FUNimation) April 19, 2001 (Ocean)
Androids 17 and 18, the ones responsible for the future destruction of Earth, have finally awakened. The Androids are not following Dr. Gero's orders as they try to activate another Android – 16. Android 17 then kills Dr. Gero. Trunks, not wanting to stall long enough for the duo of Androids to activate 16, blows up Dr. Gero's lab. Atop the rubble, Androids 17 and 18 and Android 16, resting in his chamber, remain unfazed by the blast. The Androids awaken 16 and head towards Goku's residence to fulfill their mission.
135	120	"Good Looks and Super Power!? No Blind Spot on No. 18" / "Deadly Beauty"; Transliteration: "Kawaii Kao de Chōpawā!? Jūhachigō ni Shikaku Nashi" (Japanese: カワイイ顔で超パワー!?18号に死角なし)	Mitsuo Hashimoto	Aya Matsui	Yukio Ebisawa	April 15, 1992	September 27, 2000 (FUNimation) April 20, 2001 (Ocean)
Vegeta catches up to the trio of Androids in time to face them head-on. The first to fight is the beautiful Android 18. It seems that Android 18 has the upper edge in this fight so far. Trunks, Piccolo, Krillin, and Tien Shinhan catch up shortly after, but Vegeta agrees to a deal Android 17 made that if any of the others interfere in Vegeta's fight with Android 18 that Android 17 will get involved. It soon becomes apparent that Android 18 had been toying with Vegeta long enough for his energy to wear out. Once Vegeta's energy has lowered enough, Android 18 takes the offensive against Vegeta, who is now not as powerful enough to defend himself that much. To Trunks, this leaves no choice but to interfere against Android 18. Now with Trunks nearing Android 18, will Android 17 stay true to his words?
136	121	"Nobody Is Able to Stop Them... Is This the End of the Z Warriors!?" / "No Match for the Androids"; Transliteration: "Dare nimo Yatsura o Tomerarenai... Zetto Senshi Zenmetsu ka!?" (Japanese: 誰にも奴らを止められない...Z戦士全滅か!?)	Yamauchi Shigeyasu	Hiroshi Toda	Masayuki Uchiyama	April 22, 1992	September 28, 2000 (FUNimation) April 23, 2001 (Ocean)
With Trunks interfering, Android 17 knocks him out easily, as he does with Tien and Piccolo as well, who also attempted to intervene. Krillin is too frozen with fear to get involved and Android 16 is just standing there, off to the side. Vegeta once again tries to fight Android 18, but is beaten easily. Androids 17 and 18 have easily beaten a considerable amount of Earth's heroes and head off to complete their mission, but can Goku recover in time to help and protect himself?
137	122	"Piccolo's Resolution!! The Last Measure in His Reserve" / "Last Ditch Effort"; Transliteration: "Pikkoro no Ketsui!! Totteoki no Saigo no Shudan" (Japanese: ピッコロの決意!!とっておきの最後の手段)	Kazuhito Kikuchi	Hiroshi Toda	Tadayoshi Yamamuro	April 29, 1992	September 29, 2000 (FUNimation) April 24, 2001 (Ocean)
As the Androids try to find a car for some fun, the Z-Fighters try to think of a way to get stronger quickly as Piccolo heads to Kami's Lookout for the one thing he needs to beat the Androids- fuse with Kami.
138	123	"Walking Weapons of Mass Destruction!! The Artificial Humans Draw Near Goku" / "Closing In"; Transliteration: "Aruku Chōhakai Heiki!! Jinzō Ningen ga Gokū ni Semaru" (Japanese: 歩く超破壊兵器!!人造人間が悟空に迫る)	Yoshihiro Ueda	Katsuyuki Sumisawa	Takeo Ide	May 6, 1992	October 2, 2000 (FUNimation) April 25, 2001 (Ocean)
The Androids find a car to find Goku, but have to deal with the authorities. Meanwhile, Kami looks over the Earth for some time to decide to fuse with Piccolo, as Krillin and Trunks head to Goku's house to take him somewhere else, but how long can Goku be hidden until he's better?
139	124	"An Ominous Foreboding! Bulma Unveils a Mystery" / "Unwelcome Discovery"; Transliteration: "Fukitsu na Yokan! Buruma ga Shiraseta Misuterī" (Japanese: 不吉な予感！ブルマが知らせたミステリー)	Mitsuo Hashimoto	Katsuyuki Sumisawa	Yukio Ebisawa	May 13, 1992	October 3, 2000 (FUNimation) April 26, 2001 (Ocean)
The Androids are still driving a van to Goku's house. Goku is being taken to another place to be safe from the androids. He is ill and sees nightmares of the androids killing Gohan, Krillin, Chi-Chi and Future Trunks. Meanwhile, Vegeta thinks about how Android 18 nearly killed him as her taunting words ring through his mind. He says to himself that there must be a higher level of strength that a Saiyan can achieve other than Super Saiyan. Finally, he makes up his mind that he will work tirelessly to achieve this higher level by saying "I will be legendary!" Bulma gets news about a time machine made by Capsule Corp. Where has it come from? And who does it belong to?
