= Dragonball Evolution (soundtrack) =

Dragonball Evolution: Original Motion Picture Soundtrack

Soundtrack album by Brian Tyler and the Hollywood Studio Symphony
- Released: March 17, 2009 (United States); March 30, 2009 (Europe); April 15, 2009 (Japan)
- Recorded: Newman Scoring Stage
- Genre: Film score
- Length: 57:17
- Label: Varèse Sarabande
- Producers: Brian Tyler; Robert Townson

Alternative cover
- International cover

Dragonball Evolution: Original Motion Picture Soundtrack is the soundtrack album to the 2009 Twentieth Century Fox film Dragonball Evolution, directed by James Wong, by composer Brian Tyler. It was released on March 17, 2009, in the United States, on March 30, 2009, in Europe, and on April 15, 2009, in Japan.

The score was met with positive reviews from music critics who also drew comparisons to Tyler's previous works as well as other composer works.

== Development ==
A fan of the franchise, Tyler jumped at the job when he was offered it before filming even began. He called director James Wong stating that "they could make the film very, very epic". Tyler stated that the basis for his score is the vibe that the film is a parallel universe with a mythic aspect. He began work on the project before the initial filming by writing various themes for the anime itself. With the notion that a particular theme would be fitting for characters such as Goku, Piccolo, and Gohan. Tyler stated that he didn't want to go with "pop, synthpop stuff" that was presented in the anime as it was live-action. Instead, he wanted something that "kind of stood outside of time a little bit more", though there are references to contemporary music within the score. Tyler conducted the score with the Hollywood Studio Symphony at the Newman Scoring Stage on the Twentieth Century Fox lot. With orchestrations by Robert Elhai, Brad Warnaar, Dana Niu, and Pakk Hui.

== Track list ==
#	Track title	time
01	The Legend	1:13
02	Dragonball Evolution	3:26
03	Fulums	5:14
04	Kaiou Samma	2:34
05	Goku	3:09
06	Gohan's Special Gift	0:57
07	Master Roshi	3:45
08	The Journey Begins	0:58
09	Lighting the Torches	2:44
10	Vengeance	5:55
11	Chasing Dragonballs	2:41
12	Lord Piccolo	2:51
13	Mai Vs Chi Chi	3:55
14	A Higher Calling	2:03
15	Body Work	1:26
16	I Dream of Chi Chi	0:54
17	Grime Vinyl	1:52
18	Unwelcome Strangers	2:12
19	Bulma and Yamcha	1:51
20	Things to Come	1:42
21	Battle	6:20
22	End Game	1:32
23	Dragonball Evolution Main Titles	1:32

== Reception ==
The album received a fair reception in contrast to its corresponding film. In his Evolution review, Zac Bertschy of Anime News Network gave the score a C grade. Christopher Coleman of TrackSounds praised the soundtrack, stating that Tyler's status as a fan of the series helped fuel his performance. He then recommended the album for those who enjoyed Tyler's work in such films as Timeline and Eagle Eye. David Abraham Dueck referred to the soundtrack as "a solidly engaging, robust, and complex musical thrill ride". Yet he felt that it wasn't groundbreaking, stating that did very little to stylistically deviate from Tyler's other works. Tom Hoove of ScoreNotes gave the soundtrack an eight out of ten, citing the music as respectable. Yet like Dueck, Hoove would comment that the score was not groundbreaking, he then continued that the percussion sequences were easy to get into, and would also go on record citing "Chasing Dragonballs" and "Grime Vinyl" as favorite tracks. James Southall of Movie Wave gave the soundtrack three and a half stars. As he felt that while the soundtrack played too long, it was not much of a problem, as "Tyler was able to keep his pace throughout the film". He would also describe that album as an amalgamation of Timeline and Danny Elfman's Batman and Spider-Man scores.
