= Dragonball Evolution (video game) =

2009 video game

- North American cover art
- Developer: Dimps
- Publisher: Namco Bandai Games (Note: Released under the Bandai brand name outside North America.)
- Designer: Kazuhiko Yamamoto
- Engine: Shin Budokai (PSP)
- Platform: PlayStation Portable
- Release: JP: March 19, 2009; NA: April 8, 2009; EU: April 17, 2009
- Genre: Versus fighting
- Modes: Single-player, online-player

Dragonball Evolution is a fighting video game for the PlayStation Portable based on the live-action film of the same name. The game was released in March 2009 in Japan, followed by a North American release on April 8, 2009. It is the first Dragon Ball video game to feature Bulma as a playable character.

== Gameplay ==
The gameplay is very similar to that of its ancestor, Dragon Ball Z: Shin Budokai - Another Road. It was developed by Dimps, the same creators of Dragon Ball Z: Shin Budokai and Dragon Ball Z: Shin Budokai - Another Road. Same rush attacks, Same Commands, and same Gameplay/Engine.

== Characters ==
- Goku
- Bulma
- Roshi
- Yamcha
- Chi-chi
- Grandpa Gohan
- Piccolo
- Mai
- Neo Piccolo
- Fu-Lum
- Great Ape Goku (Oozaru)

== Reception ==
Reception

Aggregate scores
Aggregator	Score
GameRankings	37%
Metacritic	28/100

Review scores
Publication	Score
Famitsu	27/40
GamePro	2.5/5
GameRevolution	D−
GameSpot	3.5/10
GamesRadar+	1.5/5
GameZone	2.7/10
IGN	2/10
PlayStation: The Official Magazine	1.5/5

The game received "unfavorable" reviews according to video game review aggregator Metacritic, same as the film itself, Dragonball Evolution. IGN called it a "pile of trash", "disaster burned onto a UMD", and "competitor for the worst game on the PSP." Reviewers noted that pressing the same button repeatedly was sufficient to win battles against the AI in the game's story mode, while adding an Ultimate Attack to the mix was similarly effective in the arcade mode. GamePro gave the game a moderate review, writing, "despite horrible graphics, spotty A.I., and some severely unbalanced characters, Dragon Ball Evolution on PSP at least delivers fast action and multiple modes of play." In Japan, Famitsu gave it a much better score of one seven, one six, and two sevens, for a total of 27 out of 40. The game was included among the worst games of all time by GamesRadar in 2014.
