= Dragonball Evolution =

2009 film by James Wong

- Theatrical release poster
- Directed by: James Wong
- Screenplay by: Ben Ramsey
- Based on: Dragon Ball by Akira Toriyama
- Produced by: Stephen Chow
- Starring: Justin Chatwin; Emmy Rossum; Jamie Chung; Chow Yun-fat
- Cinematography: Robert McLachlan
- Edited by: Matthew Friedman; Chris Willingham
- Music by: Brian Tyler
- Production companies: Dune Entertainment III; Star Overseas
- Distributed by: 20th Century Fox
- Release dates: March 10, 2009 (Japan, Hong Kong); April 10, 2009 (United States)
- Running time: 85 minutes
- Countries: United States; Hong Kong
- Language: English
- Budget: $30 million
- Box office: $56.5 million

Dragonball Evolution is a 2009 superhero film based on the 1984–95 manga series Dragon Ball by Akira Toriyama. Directed by James Wong from a screenplay by Ben Ramsey, and produced by Stephen Chow, it stars Justin Chatwin, Emmy Rossum, James Marsters, Jamie Chung, Chow Yun-fat, Joon Park, and Eriko Tamura. In the film, the teenager Goku reveals his past and sets out to fight the evil alien warlord Demon King Piccolo who wishes to gain the powerful Dragon Balls and use them to take over Earth.

Dragonball Evolution was released in Japan and several other Asian countries on March 13, 2009, and in the United States on April 10. It grossed $56.5 million worldwide against a production budget of $30 million and was a box-office bomb. The film received generally negative reviews from critics. Dragonball Evolution was intended to be the first of a series, though its reception caused Fox to cancel all subsequent films. The film has been accused of whitewashing and has negatively impacted future anime-to-cinema adaptations.

== Plot ==
Two thousand years ago, the Namekian Demon King Piccolo came to Earth and wreaked havoc. Seven mystics were able to seal Piccolo away using a powerful enchantment called the Mafuba. However, he breaks free in present-day and, with his ninja-like henchwoman Mai, begins searching for the seven Dragonballs, killing anyone in his path.

On his eighteenth birthday, martial artist and high school senior Goku is given the four-star Dragonball by his Grandpa Gohan. Returning home from a party hosted by his crush Chi-Chi, Goku finds his home destroyed by Piccolo, who was looking for the Dragonball. Before he dies, Gohan tells Goku to seek out martial arts guru Master Roshi, who has another one of the Dragonballs.

Goku then meets Bulma of the Capsule Corporation, who has invented a device that locates the Dragonballs. Goku offers Bulma protection in exchange for helping him find Roshi. After finding him in Paozu City, Roshi joins their search and begins helping Goku master his ki. During their search for another Dragonball, they fall into a trap set by the desert bandit Yamcha, whom Roshi convinces to join them by promising some of the royalties for Bulma's invention. Together, they fight off an ambush by Mai and obtain the next Dragonball.

As the group continues their quest, they visit The World Martial Arts Tournament where Chi-Chi is competing; she fights Mai in a match, who steals a sample of her blood. Chi-Chi briefly joins the group as they travel to a temple where Roshi consults his former teacher Sifu Norris and begins preparing a new Mafuba enchantment to reseal Piccolo, while Chi-Chi helps Goku in his training to learn the most powerful of the ki-bending techniques: the Kamehameha Wave. That night, Mai arrives having used Chi-Chi's blood to assume her appearance. Unable to tell Mai from Chi-Chi, Goku accidentally knocks out Chi-Chi and is shot by Mai, who steals the team's Dragonballs. Goku, Bulma, Yamcha, and Roshi go in pursuit of Mai and Piccolo.

Having acquired all seven Dragonballs, Piccolo arrives at the Dragon Temple and begins to summon Shenron, but is stopped by the timely arrival of Goku's team. During the ensuing battle, Piccolo reveals to Goku that he is his minion, Ōzaru the Great Ape, having been sent to Earth in a spaceship as an infant to destroy it. As the solar eclipse transforms Goku into Ōzaru. Roshi attempts to use the Mafuba on Piccolo, but he doesn't have enough energy, allowing Piccolo to break free. Ōzaru chokes Roshi to death, but his dying words enable Goku to fight back Ōzaru and restore to himself. He engages Piccolo in a final battle, seemingly defeating him with the Kamehameha Wave. Goku then uses the Dragonballs to summon Shenron, restoring Roshi back to life. As the group celebrates, Bulma declares that the Dragonballs have scattered, and that they must search for them again. Before heading out, Goku meets with Chi-Chi and apologizes for knocking her unconscious, and they begin a sparring match. Meanwhile, a still alive Piccolo is treated by old woman.

== Cast ==
- Justin Chatwin as Goku
- Chow Yun-fat as Master Roshi
- Emmy Rossum as Bulma
- Jamie Chung as Chi-Chi
- James Marsters as King Piccolo
- Joon Park as Yamcha
- Eriko Tamura as Mai
- Randall Duk Kim as Grandpa Gohan
- Ian Whyte as Ōzaru
- Ernie Hudson as Sifu Norris
- Texas Battle as Carey Fuller
- Richard Blake as Agundes
- Megumi Seki as Seki
- Shavon Kirksey as Emi
- Jon Valera as Moreno

== Production ==
=== Development ===
In 1995, Hong Kong action film star Jackie Chan, who was a fan of the series, had expressed some interest in adapting Dragon Ball into a live-action film. However, he said it would require "a lot of amazing special effects and an enormous budget." When asked about the casting for main protagonist Goku in 2013, Dragon Ball creator Akira Toriyama said that "nobody came to mind" for the role, but if "it were back when Jackie Chan was still young, I suppose I would have thought nobody could play Goku but him."

In 2002, 20th Century Fox acquired the live-action feature film rights to the Dragon Ball franchise from Shueisha, publisher of Toriyama's original manga series. The English dub of the Dragon Ball Z anime had previously aired on several Fox stations in the late 1990s while in first-run syndication, before moving to Cartoon Network. Mark Schilling reported that Toriyama was engaged by 20th Century Fox as a creative consultant. In the same year, Stephen Chow was approached to direct the film, and although he said he was deeply interested because he is a fan of Dragon Ball, Chow declined the chance to direct. Instead, he accepted a role as a producer via his company Star Overseas. Robert Rodriguez, Mark A.Z. Dippé and Zack Snyder were offered the job, but passed. 20th Century Fox then went on to send the script to writer/director James Wong, who accepted. In 2007, Wong and RatPac-Dune Entertainment co-founder Brett Ratner were announced as director and producer, respectively, and the project was retitled Dragonball. Ben Ramsey's first draft was deemed too expensive to shoot, and, in the end, he wrote about five different drafts of the script following notes from the studio. Wong wrote the last draft, again according to notes from the studio, but decided to remain uncredited as the co-screenwriter. Chow was a Dragon Ball fan, citing its "airy and unstrained story [which] leaves much room for creation", but explained he would only serve as a producer because he believes that he should only direct stories he had created.

Different production costs have been reported by various sources. In January 2008, Marsters spoke to TV Guide that he was told the film had a budget of approximately $100 million. In April 2009, the Spanish television station Telecinco reported that the budget was $50 million. Marsters would later claim that the film in fact was produced for $30 million.

=== Casting ===
Justin Chatwin was selected to play the film's central character Goku. Ron Perlman was originally offered the role of the villain Lord Piccolo, but turned it down to work on Hellboy II: The Golden Army. James Marsters, who accepted the role, noted he was a fan of the original anime adaptation, describing it as "the coolest television cartoon in the last 50,000 years [because] it's got a Shakespearean sense of good and evil." Summarizing the original concept of his Piccolo, he said the character was "thousands of years old and a very long time ago he used to be a force of good, but [he] got into a bad argument and was put into prison for 2000 years. It got him very angry, and he finds a way to escape and then tries to destroy the world." Originally, Piccolo was going to be depicted as a handsome creature, but Marsters and the make-up artist chose to give him a decrepit complexion to reflect his having been trapped for thousands of years stewing in his evil and thirst for vengeance. The first time the make-up was applied, it took seventeen hours and left Marsters with difficulty breathing. In subsequent applications, it generally only took four hours.

Stephen Chow originally wanted to cast Zhang Yuqi, with whom he worked on CJ7, for the part of Chi Chi, but the role eventually went to Jamie Chung.

=== Filming ===
Despite the writers strike, principal photography began on December 3, 2007, in Mexico City, Mexico. Locations included the Universidad Tecnológica de México.

From January 2, 2008, the crew shot at Sierra de Órganos National Park in Zacatecas. The crew moved to State of Mexico in March of that year for some shots at Nevado de Toluca. Shooting was also scheduled at Los Angeles, California. In adapting the Dragon Ball manga, the futuristic cities and flying vehicles were kept; however, the anthropomorphic creatures and talking animals (such as Turtle, Oolong, Puar, Shu, and Korin) were dropped. Many of the locations have a strong East Asian aesthetic, with additional influence from Aztec civilization architecture, particularly their temples. It was thought that Rossum would wear a blue wig to resemble her manga counterpart, but it was ultimately decided that such a look was too unrealistic. Instead, she had her natural brown with blue streaks. Chatwin did not wear a wig as the director felt Chatwin's hair resembled Goku's. A large amount of Dragonball Evolution was shot in an abandoned jeans factory, also located in Durango, Mexico.

Dragonball Evolution special effects were done by Amalgamated Dynamics, while the visual effects were done by Ollin Studios, Zoic Studios, and Imagine Engine.

== Music ==
On December 9, 2008, it was confirmed that the theme song would be "Rule" by Japanese singer Ayumi Hamasaki. Also featured on the film's soundtrack is American pop artist Brian Anthony, whose remixed song "Worked Up" was released as a single in English territories, and is included on the home video releases as a bonus feature.

The film's soundtrack, Dragonball Evolution: Original Motion Picture Soundtrack, was released in the United States on March 17, 2009, by Varèse Sarabande.

The score was composed by Brian Tyler, who recorded the score with an 82-piece ensemble of the Hollywood Studio Symphony at the Newman Scoring Stage at 20th Century Fox. The score was met with positive reviews from music critics, who drew comparisons to Tyler's previous works.

== Marketing ==
=== Novelization ===
A film novelization, Dragonball Evolution: The Junior Novel, was written by Stacia Deutsch and Rhody Cohon. Aimed at children ages 8–15, the novel was released by Viz Media on February 24, 2009. The same day, a series of chapter books for readers 7–10 was released.

The three volumes, subtitled The Discovery, The Search, and The Battle were also written by Deutsch and Cohan.

A 16-paged sticker book, Dragonball: Evolution Sticker Book, followed on March 24, 2009. Released a week later on March 31, 2009, by Viz was a 22-page Dragonball: Evolution Posterzine featuring eleven posters, cast interviews, and merchandise previews.

=== Video game ===
On January 19, 2009, Namco Bandai Games and Fox announced a tie-in PSP video game, which was released in Japan on March 19 and North America on April 7. The game includes all of the major characters from the film and features various playing modes, including a local multi-player battle mode, production stills, and storyboards from the film.

=== Merchandise ===
The Hong Kong-based company Enterbay produced a 1:6-scaled line for Dragonball Evolution. A 1:6 Goku figure was made along with Lord Piccolo. Bulma was planned to be the third figure of the series in addition to being the first female figure Enterbay has ever released. Prototypes of the Bulma figure were shown on Enterbay's blog but in November 2010, Enterbay confirmed that Bulma was canceled. Bandai America released a mass-market toy-line based on the movie in time for the theatrical release. The figures came in 4-inch and 6-inch versions. Lastly, Japanese toy company MediCom created stylized Goku and Piccolo Be@rbrick toys to coincide with the release of the film.

=== Tie-ins ===
The July 2008 issue of Jump Square published a manga by Daisuke Kadokuni, inspired by the film.

== Release ==
=== Theatrical ===
Though an American film, Dragonball: Evolution was released in Japan and Hong Kong on March 13, 2009, nearly a month before its American release. It was released in Australia on April 2 and in the United Kingdom on April 8.

Its release in its home country changed dates many times. Initially scheduled to be released in North America on August 15, 2008, it was later moved to April 2009 to allow time for additional filming and post-production work. The specific date then changed back and forth between April 10 and 8, with the final release date being April 10.

The marketing of the theatrical release included a viral "personal expressions" campaign created by digital agency Red Box New Media that ran on the Windows Live Messenger application. Alongside that campaign, Fox hired Picture Production Company to develop a PC/Wii flash game under the name Can you Ka-Me-Ha-Me-Ha? This game was released just before the film in conjunction with another viral campaign that encouraged fans to send in their renditions of the fighting move.

=== Home media ===
The film was released on Region 1 DVD and Blu-ray Disc in North America on July 28 and on Region 2 DVD and Blu-ray Disc in the United Kingdom on August 31. The Region 4 DVD and Blu-ray Disc was released in Australia on November 18.

== Reception ==
=== Box office ===
The film had a gross earning in the United States and Canada of $9,362,785 and an international gross of $47,148,672 for a combined worldwide box office gross of $56,511,457.

The film opened with its competitors—Hannah Montana: The Movie and Fast & Furious (the latter in its second weekend). On its opening weekend in the United States, the film grossed $4,756,488 from 2,181 sites. Box Office Mojo described this as "paltry", and was comparable to Street Fighter: The Legend of Chun-Li and Speed Racer. In its second weekend, it dropped to 11th place.

=== Critical response ===
On the review aggregator website Rotten Tomatoes, 14% of 63 critics' reviews are positive, with an average rating of 3.6/10. The website's consensus reads: "Executed with little panache or invention, Dragonball Evolution lacks the magic that made the books on which it was based a cult sensation." Metacritic, which uses a weighted average, assigned the film a score of 45 out of 100, based on 10 critics, indicating "mixed or average" reviews. Audiences surveyed by CinemaScore gave the film a grade C+ on scale of A to F.

Zac Bertschy of Anime News Network, who was initially annoyed at fans of the franchise who criticized the film via leaked set shots and trailers before the film's release, eventually gave the movie a negative rating and conceded that "the fans were right." He also criticized its poor explanation of plot elements, hackneyed storyline, and lackluster effort by the actors. Variety's Russell Edwards found the film "passable", "pleasing if paint-by-numbers", noting it "doesn't take itself too seriously, but avoids campiness", that "the climactic clash between Piccolo and Goku offers a faithful CGI representation of the ethereal powers as drawn in the original manga" and that the climax offers an "impressive character twist for Goku that will warm the cockles of every young Jungian's heart." Luke Thompson of E! Online referred to the film as a "surreal mess" that would only make sense to fans of the original series. He questioned the use of a Caucasian in the main role and felt Chow Yun-Fat was "overacting like never before", but did consider it "fun in a train-wreck kind of way" and that while it was never boring it was also never "logical, coherent [or] rational".

Christopher Monfette of IGN gave the film a positive review, stating that it captured "the flavor of anime without becoming overly cartoonish". He praised the main cast for "creating characters the audience can actually care about" and felt Chatwin was particularly likeable as Goku. Slant Magazine's Rob Humanick considered the film "uninspired" and implausible with an "aimlessly hyperactive construction and complete lack of substance" and "cobbled-together FX fakery". Reviewing the film for Australia's ABC Radio National, Jason Di Rosso stated the film was "lacking the visual panache of recent graphic novel adaptations". He agreed the film was uninspired and also felt it had dull "high school movie banter" dialog and was "cliché-ridden". The Village Voice's Aaron Hillis called the film a "loony live-action adaptation", but felt it was "more entertaining than it deserves to be" and would likely appeal to ten-year-old boys. Alonso Duralde of MSNBC found the film to be "both entertainingly ridiculous and ridiculously entertaining" and noted that "kids will have such a blast that you can turn this movie into the gateway kung-fu drug that makes them want to watch the earlier work of Stephen Chow and Chow Yun-Fat, that is if Stephen Chow and Chow Yun-fat had a Caucasian actor in the starring role." Jeffrey K. Lyles of The Gazette found the film to be "a fairly entertaining martial arts adventure for the younger audiences" and tolerable to adults. He felt Chatwin was ill-cast as Goku, and that director Wong failed to capture the "frenetic sense of the anime" adaptation in the action scenes, leaving them an effort to understand.

Since its release, the film has been considered to be one of the worst films ever made. It was the lowest-rated film on IMDb for over ten years.

=== Creator response ===
Before the film's release, Dragon Ball creator Akira Toriyama expressed surprise at Dragonball Evolution and suggested fans treat it as an alternate universe version of his work. In a 2013 interview with Asahi Shimbun, Toriyama revealed that he had felt the script did not "capture the world or the characteristics" of his series and was "bland" and not interesting, so he cautioned and gave suggestions for changes. But the Hollywood producers did not heed his advice, "And just as I thought, the result was a movie I cannot call Dragon Ball." Discussing the film in 2016's 30th Anniversary Dragon Ball Chōshishū – Super History Book, Toriyama wrote: "I had put Dragon Ball behind me, but seeing how much that live-action film ticked me off, and how I revised that script for the anime movie and complained about the quality of the TV anime, I suppose somewhere along the line it's become a series I like too much to ever leave alone."

At the 2014 Wizard World Convention, actor James Marsters expressed feelings that he was misled about Dragonball: Evolution, claiming, "they told me it was a $120 million picture, and that Stephen Chow was producing. And I get out to Durango, Mexico and it's a $30 million picture and Stephen Chow is just on paper to fool us down into the desert. And they don't even want to pay for the stuntman to get made up like me, so they never used the stuntman; they just kept putting me up on wires. I still have a separated clavicle from the shoot, because it was just gnarly." He would later take on the role of Zamasu in Dragon Ball Super for free as a way to "redeem himself with the Dragon Ball Z community" following his work on the film.

In 2016, writer Ben Ramsey apologized for his work on the film, writing: "To have something with my name on it as the writer be so globally reviled is gut-wrenching. To receive hate mail from all over the world is heartbreaking. ... I went into the project chasing after a big payday, not as a fan of the franchise but as a businessman taking on an assignment. I have learned that when you go into a creative endeavor without passion you come out with sub-optimal results, and sometimes flat-out garbage. So I'm not blaming anyone for Dragonball [Evolution] but myself."

Following Akira Toriyama's death on March 1, 2024, Justin Chatwin took to social media to send his condolences while also apologizing for the quality of the film.

In 2025, editor Kazuhiko Torishima pinned some of the blame on Shueisha. He stated that the company was unwilling to invest in final cut rights due to the financial failure of its previous film effort Daijōbu, My Friend. Because of this, the company was locked out of having final say over the script, something which he felt was necessary to produce the film.

=== Accolades ===
The film was nominated for a 2009 Spike TV Scream Award for "Best Comic Book Movie", but lost to Watchmen. JoBlo.com nominated the film for its Golden Schmoes Awards in the category Worst Movie of the Year 2009, but lost to Transformers: Revenge of the Fallen.

== Canceled sequels ==
At the time it was released, plans were in place for a sequel film to Dragonball Evolution. In a 2009 interview with IGN, James Marsters, who played King Piccolo, said that he had signed on for three films and expressed interest in making as many as seven, stating that his character "only really gets interesting in the second film". Justin Chatwin commented that subsequent films would feature elements from the Dragon Ball Z portion of the franchise, likely delving further into his Saiyan origins, and introducing Gohan and Vegeta, which he felt was "really exciting. It goes into the whole legend of Dragonball". A script for a sequel, called Dragon Ball: Over Nine Thousand, was being written before the film's release. Marsters said that he would have reprised his role in future films, having "every intention of fulfilling the arc of Piccolo in live-action". Marsters indicated that the planned arc would feature elements from Dragon Ball Z, potentially including Piccolo's reincarnation and redemption, which would merge Piccolo and his son Piccolo Jr. into one character. Chatwin and Chung also expressed their hopes that Goku's best friend Krillin would be included in a sequel, noting "their dynamic in the anime's just too good not to use in this movie. If the studio knew better, they'd already have people lined up for auditions". The film's poor commercial and critical performance caused any planned sequels to be canceled.

== See also ==
- List of films based on manga
