= Dragon Ball Z season 5 =

Dragon Ball Z
- Season 5
- North American DVD release cover featuring Cell in his Perfect Form
- No. of episodes: 26

Release
- Original network: Fuji Television
- Original release: May 20 – November 18, 1992

Season chronology
- ← Previous; Season 4 Next → Season 6

The fifth season of the Dragon Ball Z anime series contains the Imperfect Cell and Perfect Cell arcs, which comprises Part 2 of the Cell Saga. The episodes are produced by Toei Animation, and are based on the final 26 volumes of the Dragon Ball manga series by Akira Toriyama.

The 26-episode season originally ran from May to November 1992 in Japan on Fuji Television. The first English airing of the series was on Cartoon Network where Funimation Entertainment's dub of the series ran from October to November 2000. The Ocean dub first aired in the United Kingdom from April to June 2001.

Funimation released the season in a box set on May 27, 2008, and in June 2009, announced that they would be re-releasing Dragon Ball Z in a new seven volume set called the "Dragon Boxes". Based on the original series masters with frame-by-frame restoration, the first set was released November 10, 2009.

== Episode list ==
No. overall	Initial dub no.	Translated title/Funimation's dub title Original Japanese title	Directed by	Written by	Animation directed by	Original release date	English air date
140	125	"Discovery of an Evil Egg!! A Terrified Trunks" / "Seized with Fear"; Transliteration: "Jaaku no Tamago o Hakken!! Kyōfu suru Torankusu" (Japanese: 邪悪の卵を発見!!恐怖するトランクス)	Yoshihiro Ueda	Katsuyuki Sumisawa	Kazuya Hisada	May 20, 1992	October 4, 2000 (FUNimation) April 27, 2001 (Ocean)
Gohan and Trunks head to the other time capsule with Bulma to find out more about the truth of the extra time machine.
141	126	"To Face an Unprecedented Foe... Birth of a Super Namekian!!" / "The Reunion"; Transliteration: "Katsutenai Teki ni Mukete... Sūpā Namekkuseijin Tanjō!!" (Japanese: かつてない敵に向けて…超ナメック星人誕生!!)	Daisuke Nishio	Katsuyuki Sumisawa	Masayuki Uchiyama	May 27, 1992	October 5, 2000 (FUNimation) April 30, 2001 (Ocean)
While Gohan and Trunks go to Master Roshi's island, there's a crisis in Gingertown where its inhabitants are disappearing but with no damage to the town. Realizing this threat, Kami decides to fuse with Piccolo, but will their combined power be enough to handle whatever is going on down there?
142	127	"Kamehame-Ha!? The Monster Who Possesses Goku's Ki" / "Borrowed Powers"; Transliteration: "Kamehameha!? Gokū no Ki o Motsu Monsutā" (Japanese: カメハメ波!?悟空の気を持つモンスター)	Jun'ichi Fujise; Storyboarded by : Daisuke Nishio	Katsuyuki Sumisawa	Minoru Maeda	June 3, 1992	October 6, 2000 (FUNimation) May 1, 2001 (Ocean)
The deserted streets of Gingertown become a battlefield as the powered-up Piccolo confronts this terror from the future. The monster's name is Cell, and he gains strength from sucking the power out of his victims! But that's not the only secret the creature reveals. Somehow, he also knows Goku's special move, the Kamehameha!
143	128	"A Life Form of Evil and Destruction!! His Name Is Artificial Human Cell" / "His Name is Cell"; Transliteration: "Zōo to Hakai no Seimeitai!! Yatsu no Na wa Jinzō Ningen Seru" (Japanese: 憎悪と破壊の生命体!!奴の名は人造人間セル)	Mitsuo Hashimoto	Katsuyuki Sumisawa	Tadayoshi Yamamuro	June 10, 1992	October 9, 2000 (FUNimation) May 2, 2001 (Ocean)
With the element of surprise, the creature gets a hold of Piccolo and begins to absorb him, but Piccolo manages to break free. With his arm weakened, Piccolo surrenders, but the Super Namekian asks for one last request to know who this creature is. His name is Cell, an Android made of the strongest fighters in the universe and he's hungry for more power, thanks to Dr. Gero.
144	129	"Piccolo's Grievous Mistake! Cell Turned Loose on the City!" / "Piccolo's Folly"; Transliteration: "Pikkoro Tsūkon no Daishippai! Seru ga Machi ni Hanatareta!" (Japanese: ピッコロ痛恨の大失敗！セルが街に放たれた！)	Yoshihiro Ueda	Katsuyuki Sumisawa	Yukio Ebisawa	June 17, 1992	October 10, 2000 (FUNimation) May 3, 2001 (Ocean)
As the Android from the future tells Piccolo his objective to absorb Androids 17 and 18 to obtain his "Perfect Form", Piccolo regenerates his arm. With his power restored and Krillin and Trunks by his side, Piccolo has a good chance against Cell, but the Android has more tricks up his sleeve. It is revealed that Cell killed Trunks in his future.
145	130	"The Secret of Cell's Birth! What Lies Below the Laboratory!?" / "Laboratory Basement"; Transliteration: "Seru Tanjō no Himitsu! Kenkyūjo no Chika ni Nani ga Aru!?" (Japanese: セル誕生の秘密！研究所の地下に何がある!?)	Daisuke Nishio	Hiroshi Toda	Masayuki Uchiyama	June 24, 1992	October 11, 2000 (FUNimation) May 4, 2001 (Ocean)
By using Tien's Solar Flare, Cell manages to escape and suppress his power in order to complete his dreadful mission. After telling everyone the bad news, Piccolo and Tien find Cell, as Trunks and Krillin try to find the bunker beneath Gero's laboratory and destroy the present Cell and find some incredible news: the plans of Android 17.
146	131	"Goku Awakens to Battle! Go Beyond Super Saiyan!!" / "Our Hero Awakes"; Transliteration: "Gokū Tatakai e no Mezame! Sūpā Saiyajin o Koero!!" (Japanese: 悟空闘いへの目覚め！超サイヤ人を超えろ!!)	Mitsuo Hashimoto	Aya Matsui	Kazuya Hisada	July 1, 1992	October 12, 2000 (FUNimation) May 8, 2001 (Ocean)
As Krillin heads back to Master Roshi's, he crosses Cell's path and barely escapes his wrath as Piccolo and Tien arrive at the scene. Meanwhile, Trunks finds his father to train with him in order to surpass a Super Saiyan. As hope seems lost, a glimmer still remains: Goku has made a recovery and plans to get stronger, but how?
147	132	"Hasten Your Training, Saiyans! In the Room of Spirit and Time..." / "Time Chamber"; Transliteration: "Shugyō o Isoge Saiyajin! Seishin to Toki no Heya de..." (Japanese: 修行を急げサイヤ人！精神と時の部屋で…)	Yamauchi Shigeyasu	Aya Matsui	Tadayoshi Yamamuro	July 8, 1992	October 13, 2000 (FUNimation) May 9, 2001 (Ocean)
After enduring the terrifically horrifying effect of the viral heart disease, Goku recovers, and has only one objective on his mind: surpassing the level of Super Saiyan. With Vegeta's mind set on reaching the same seemingly unreachable goal, Goku takes him, Trunks and Gohan to the mysterious Hyperbolic Time Chamber, a room where one year is equivalent to that of one Earth day. Meanwhile, the Androids face an unexpected and unforeseen issue: Goku's not home. With the Androids now closing in on Master Roshi's island, can Piccolo beat the destructive trio?
148	133	"The Gekiretsu Kodan That Split the Heavens!! Piccolo vs. Artificial Human No. 17" / "The Monster is Coming"; Transliteration: "Ten o Saku Gekiretsu Kōdan!! Pikkoro Tai Jinzō Ningen Jūnanagō" (Japanese: 天を裂く激烈光弾!!ピッコロVS人造人間17号)	Yoshihiro Ueda	Katsuyuki Sumisawa	Yukio Ebisawa	July 15, 1992	October 16, 2000 (FUNimation) May 10, 2001 (Ocean)
Piccolo begins his epic battle against Android 17, and he seems to be on par with the mechanical monster, meanwhile Bulma continues to work on the remote that will shut down the Androids. However, Cell can feel Piccolo's energy, and knowing he must be fighting one of the Androids, he charges towards them, in the hope that he will become complete.
149	134	"How I Have Waited for This Day!! Cell's Prologue to Perfection" / "He's Here"; Transliteration: "Kono Hi o Matte Ita!! Seru - Kanzentai eno Jokyoku" (Japanese: この日を待っていた!!セル・完全体への序曲)	Daisuke Nishio	Katsuyuki Sumisawa	Masayuki Uchiyama	July 22, 1992	October 17, 2000 (FUNimation) May 11, 2001 (Ocean)
Piccolo and 17 continue their showdown, unaware that the power-hungry Cell is approaching fast. Piccolo is as strong as 17 but fatigue kicks in, while the malicious Android's power remains undrained. Meanwhile Goku and Gohan impatiently wait for Vegeta and Trunks to finish their Super Saiyan training in the Hyperbolic Time Chamber. Cell arrives at the battlefield, ready to attain his final perfect form, and the Androids don't seem to know who Cell is.
150	135	"The Suicide Counterattack Proves Ineffective! Piccolo's Flame Burns Out!!" / "Up to Piccolo"; Transliteration: "Sutemi no Hangeki Oyobazu! Pikkoro Moetsukiru!!" (Japanese: 捨て身の反撃及ばず！ピッコロ燃え尽きる!!)	Mitsuo Hashimoto	Aya Matsui	Kazuya Hisada	July 29, 1992	October 18, 2000 (FUNimation) May 14, 2001 (Ocean)
With more people absorbed, Cell has become more powerful than both Piccolo and 17 combined. Despite Piccolo's best attempts, Cell easily disposes of Piccolo. Knowing of his origin and mission the Androids must work together in order to save themselves from Cell's overwhelming power.
151	136	"One Final Remaining Hope... No. 16, the Wordless Warrior, Takes Action!!" / "Silent Warrior"; Transliteration: "Nokosareta Yuiitsu no Nozomi... Mugon no Senshi Jūrokugō Tatsu!!" (Japanese: 残された唯一の望み…無言の戦士16号立つ!!)	Mitsuo Hashimoto; Storyboarded by : Kazuhito Kikuchi	Aya Matsui	Masayuki Uchiyama	August 5, 1992	October 19, 2000 (FUNimation) May 15, 2001 (Ocean)
With Piccolo gone, Android 17 has no choice but to fight Cell on his own or so it seems, that is until Android 16 steps in to fight. As the battle rages on, it is easily noticeable that Android 16 is just as strong as Cell, but can the silent giant Android 16 defeat Cell? Or maybe this fight will buy Vegeta and Trunks the precious time they need to complete their training in the Hyperbolic Time Chamber.
152	137	"No. 17 Swallowed... The Transforming Cell is a Super Gourmet" / "Say Goodbye, 17"; Transliteration: "Jūnanagō o Nomikonda... Henshin Seru wa Chōgurume" (Japanese: 17号を飲み込んだ…変身セルは超グルメ)	Yoshihiro Ueda	Aya Matsui	Tadayoshi Yamamuro	August 12, 1992	October 20, 2000 (FUNimation) May 16, 2001 (Ocean)
The battle between Android 16 and Cell continues. Cell tries to counter-attack but falls short to 16's Hell's Flash. 16 warns 17 and 18 to quickly leave the battlefield, however they wait, believing Cell to be dead. But before they can do so, Cell sneaks up behind 17, and before he can get away, Cell quickly absorbs him, much to 16's horror. Cell transforms into his second imperfect form, and his next task is to absorb 18 to become complete. Android 16 attempts to attack Cell, but is no match for his second form, and is severely damaged by a blast from Cell. Tien then attempts to give 16 and 18 time to escape by using several attacks to stall Cell.
153	138	"Tomorrow, I Am Going to Pulverize You!! Goku's Challenge" / "Sacrifice"; Transliteration: "Ashita wa Omee o Tatakinomesu!! Gokū no Chōsenjō" (Japanese: 明日はオメエを叩きのめす!!悟空の挑戦状)	Daisuke Nishio	Hiroshi Toda	Yukio Ebisawa	August 19, 1992	October 23, 2000 (FUNimation) May 17, 2001 (Ocean)
Tien, attempting to give 16 and 18 enough time to escape, subsequently uses up all his energy in a vicious attack, and falls to the ground. Goku knows that Cell is far stronger than Tien, so he descends on the battlefield to help Tien recover. While there he notices Piccolo is still alive, but he's hanging on by a thread. Cell desires to fight Goku immediately, but Goku uses his Instant Transmission to get back to Kami's lookout successfully, and Vegeta and Trunks finally emerge from the Hyperbolic Time Chamber.
154	139	"I Will Dispose of Everything!! A Reborn Vegeta, Father and Son, Sally Forth" / "Saiyans Emerge"; Transliteration: "Subete Ore ga Katazukeru!! Shinsei Bejīta Oyako Shutsugeki" (Japanese: 全てオレが片付ける!!新生ベジータ親子出撃)	Mitsuo Hashimoto	Hiroshi Toda	Minoru Maeda	August 26, 1992	October 24, 2000 (FUNimation) May 18, 2001 (Ocean)
Goku asks Trunks about the training, but Vegeta doesn't want him to say anything about it. Meanwhile, 18 questions 16 on his love for nature and asks if he even cares that Cell might absorb her and kill him. Bulma lands at Kami's lookout. She gives Gohan, Goku, Trunks, and Vegeta a set of Saiyan armours. Tien and Piccolo refuse to wear the suits, claiming they do not want to wear the same clothes as the Saiyans. Vegeta then leaves to find and destroy Cell, while Trunks closely follows. Anxious to find 18, Cell finds a chain of inhabited islands, and insisted to obliterate each island with energy blasts, bringing him closer to the Androids' hideout. Back at Kami's lookout, after eating a quick amount of food, Goku and Gohan enter the Hyperbolic Time Chamber to start training.
155	140	"Suddenly Full-Throttle!! The Super Power of a Radiant Vegeta" / "Super Vegeta"; Transliteration: "Ikinari Zenkai!! Hikarikagayaku Bejīta no Chōpawā" (Japanese: いきなり全開!!光り輝くベジータの超パワー)	Jun'ichi Fujise	Sumio Uetake	Kazuya Hisada	September 2, 1992	October 25, 2000 (FUNimation) May 21, 2001 (Ocean)
The heartless Cell continues to destroy the islands. He eventually finds the last island where Androids 16 and 18 is hiding, and threatens to destroy it together with them. Vegeta, anxious to test his new power, heads towards Cell's whereabouts and transforms to Super Saiyan. Just as Cell is about to destroy the last island, Vegeta arrives to fight Cell. Up on Kami's Lookout, Tien and Piccolo don't believe that Vegeta has the power to beat Cell, and neither does Android 18, based on the fact that she beat Vegeta in their fight. As Vegeta begins to power up, he begins his transformation, which stuns everybody that senses his power, including 18 and Cell. Vegeta finishes transforming, reaching an ascended level of Super Saiyan, and begins the fight by delivering the first hit to Cell.
156	141	"On Your Knees, Cell! I Am Super Vegeta!!" / "Bow to the Prince"; Transliteration: "Seru yo Hizamazuke! Ore wa Sūpā Bejīta da!!" (Japanese: セルよひざまずけ！オレは超ベジータだ!!)	Yamauchi Shigeyasu	Sumio Uetake	Masayuki Uchiyama	September 9, 1992	October 26, 2000 (FUNimation) May 22, 2001 (Ocean)
As Vegeta battles Cell, it is clear that Vegeta has the upper hand in the fight, his strength superior to Cell's. Watching from the sidelines, Trunks recalls the intense time he spent training with his father in the Hyperbolic Time Chamber. As the fight between Cell and Vegeta continues, the pressure falls on Gohan as he trains in the Time Chamber with Goku in an attempt to become a Super Saiyan.
157	142	"Dangerous Pride!! A Challenge to Cell's Perfect Form" / "Hour of Temptation"; Transliteration: "Kiken na Puraido!! Kanzentai Seru eno Chōsen" (Japanese: 危険なプライド!!完全体セルへの挑戦)	Yoshihiro Ueda	Takao Koyama	Tadayoshi Yamamuro	September 16, 1992	October 27, 2000 (FUNimation) May 23, 2001 (Ocean)
Goku and Gohan continue to push themselves forward in their training, but at this point, they may not even be needed. In his powered up state, Vegeta is making quick work of Cell, who seems to be utterly no match for Vegeta. Vegeta then explains to Cell that it is useless to fight him in his current state, as even if he somehow manages to get past him, Trunks would finish him off. With his back against the wall, the ever-clever android attempts to exploit Vegeta's weakest point, his unbridled arrogance, but Vegeta brushes this off as an attempt from Cell to get his own way, at which Cell becomes infuriated.
158	143	"I'm So Distraught!! Kururin's Handiwork in Destroying No. 18" / "Krillin's Decision"; Transliteration: "Ore Nayanjau!! Kuririn no Jūhachigō Hakai Kōsaku" (Japanese: オレ悩んじゃう!!クリリンの18号破壊工作)	Mitsuo Hashimoto	Takao Koyama	Yukio Ebisawa	September 23, 1992	October 30, 2000 (FUNimation) May 24, 2001 (Ocean)
With Cell being thrown around by Vegeta, Cell still attempts to exploit Vegeta's weak point in an attempt to get the chance to absorb Android 18. With 18 in his sights, Krillin attempts to get closer to her in an attempt to shut down the android forever. But at the moment of decision, Krillin hesitates, his emotions clouding his judgement. Cell is gaining momentum in his push for perfection, enticing Vegeta to be able to test his true power. Upon hearing this, Android 16 tells 18 that she must leave immediately, as Vegeta may let Cell go. Krillin's emotions finally get the best of him, and he destroys the controller in front of 18, just as Vegeta lets Cell go and find 18. Trunks, fearful of what would happen, intervenes and prevents Cell from looking for 18. Just as Cell complains to Vegeta, he catches a glimpse of 18 on the ground, and can only gape at the android.
159	144	"A Shock to the Entire Universe!! Cell's Spectacular Evolution Toward His Perfect Form" / "The Last Defense"; Transliteration: "Zen'uchū ni Shōgeki!! Seru, Kanzentai e Kyōi no Shinka" (Japanese: 全宇宙に衝撃!!セル、完全体へ驚異の進化)	Takahiro Imamura; Storyboarded by : Kazuhito Kikuchi	Katsuyuki Sumisawa	Naoki Miyahara	September 30, 1992	October 31, 2000 (FUNimation) May 25, 2001 (Ocean)
Cell has spotted 18, but so has Trunks, and he warns Krillin, 16, and 18 that Cell knows their whereabouts, just as Cell begins flying towards them. Trunks gives chase, and every time Cell gets the chance to absorb 18, Trunks intervenes. Vegeta has other plans, however, and begins to interfere with Trunks. Trunks defies Vegeta's thought that Trunks is too weak-minded to attack his own father, and sends Vegeta flying towards the water with a large Ki blast. As Trunks continues to interfere with Cell's quest, the android sees 16 and 18 getting away, and devises a plan, using Tien's "Solar Flare" technique to blind everybody, including Vegeta as he heads back to the battlefield. With nobody but Krillin to stand in his way, Cell is unfazed by Krillin's attempts to stall Cell as he absorbs 18 and begins his transformation.
160	145	"Battle Power Infinity!! Birth of the God of Destruction Named Cell" / "Cell is Complete"; Transliteration: "Sentōryoku Mugendai!! Seru to Iu Na no Hakaishin Tanjō" (Japanese: 戦闘力無限大!!セルという名の破壊神誕生)	Yamauchi Shigeyasu	Katsuyuki Sumisawa	Masahiro Shimanuki	October 14, 1992	November 1, 2000 (FUNimation) May 28, 2001 (Ocean)
Dr. Gero's dream has been realized, as Cell begins his final transformation, with everybody but Vegeta, who has realized his own dream of testing his strength, looking on in fear. After Cell becomes complete, he begins testing his new body, as Krillin and Trunks attempt to subdue him. Eventually, Cell tests one of his kicks on Krillin, knocking him out cold. Up in the Hyperbolic Time Chamber, Gohan and Goku are still training. Gohan becomes tired of being treated like his father's son, and wants Goku to give it everything he's got. Goku complies, transforms to a Super Saiyan, and unleashes a powerful Kamehameha wave at Gohan, who, while fighting it, realizes how he has let people down his whole life, and finally transforms into a Super Saiyan, albeit maintaining the transformation only for a few minutes.
161	146	"Super Vegeta in Peril!! An Absolutely Perfect Terror Closes In!!" / "Vegeta Must Pay"; Transliteration: "Sūpā Bejīta Ayaushi!! Kanzen Muketsu no Kyōfu ga Semaru!!" (Japanese: 超ベジータ危うし!!完全無欠の恐怖が迫る!!)	Jun'ichi Fujise	Katsuyuki Sumisawa	Masayuki Uchiyama	October 21, 1992	November 2, 2000 (FUNimation) May 29, 2001 (Ocean)
After allowing Cell to reach his final form, Vegeta is ready for the challenge he was promised. While Cell has become a brick wall to the Saiyan's every blow, it becomes clear that Vegeta has bitten off more than he can chew, as even a direct blow to the android barely phases him. Meanwhile, Goku and Gohan, who is now a proper Super Saiyan, continue to train in the Hyperbolic Time Chamber.
162	147	"Breaking Through the Boundaries of the Super Saiyan!! Trunks Summons a Storm" / "Trunks Ascends"; Transliteration: "Sūpā Saiyajin no Genkai Toppa!! Arashi o Yobu Torankusu" (Japanese: 超サイヤ人の限界突破!!嵐を呼ぶトランクス)	Daisuke Nishio	Aya Matsui	Tadayoshi Yamamuro	October 28, 1992	November 3, 2000 (FUNimation) May 30, 2001 (Ocean)
Vegeta is clearly no match for Cell now he has powered up to his Perfect form, and it seems Trunks will have no choice but to reveal his hidden ascended power. Just as it appears that Vegeta is losing consciousness, however, he powers up for his ultimate move, the Final Flash. He spends several minutes powering up for the attack, crumbling the surrounding landscape as he does so. As he prepares to launch it, he challenges Cell to stay right where he is and take on his attack. He launches it, and it proves very effective, demolishing Cell's right arm, and a large portion of the right side of his torso. Vegeta begins laughing but his celebration is quickly cut short when Cell reminds Vegeta that he possesses Piccolo's regenerative ability. Cell resumes the fight and, after a massive onslaught of Ki blasts from Vegeta, knocks Vegeta out cold, and prepares to kill Vegeta until he senses that Trunks is beginning to power up.
163	148	"Save Your Father!! Trunks' Fury, Which Scorches Even the Heavens" / "Saving Throw"; Transliteration: "Chichi o Sukue!! Ten o mo Kogasu Torankusu no Ikari" (Japanese: 父を救え!!天をも焦がすトランクスの怒り)	Mitsuo Hashimoto	Aya Matsui	Yukio Ebisawa	November 4, 1992	November 6, 2000 (FUNimation) May 31, 2001 (Ocean)
With Vegeta out of commission, it's up to the newly-ascended Trunks to take down Cell. As they fight, Trunks tries to divert Cell's attention away from his unconscious father's body, allowing Krillin to bring him to safety. Meanwhile, Goku and Gohan continue training in the Hyperbolic Time Chamber.
164	149	"A Future of Despair!! Trunks, the Man Who Lived Through Hell" / "Ghosts from Tomorrow"; Transliteration: "Zetsubō no Mirai!! Jigoku o Ikinuita Otoko Torankusu" (Japanese: 絶望の未来!!地獄を生き抜いた男トランクス)	Kazuhito Kikuchi	Hiroshi Toda	Minoru Maeda	November 11, 1992	November 7, 2000 (FUNimation) June 1, 2001 (Ocean)
Trunks recounts the events that lead to the destruction of the Z Fighters in the future. Using the rage from these memories, Trunks powers up to finish his battle with Cell. Cell then tells Trunks how he was created, and why he traveled to the future. As the battle continues, Trunks has the upper hand, but Cell claims that he knows Trunks cannot beat him.
165	150	"Super Trunks Has a Weakness!! Cell's Shocking Bombshell Declaration" / "The Cell Games"; Transliteration: "Sūpā Torankusu ni Jakuten!! Seru, Shōgeki no Bakudan Hatsugen" (Japanese: 超トランクスに弱点!!セル、衝撃の爆弾発言)	Masahiro Hosoda	Hiroshi Toda	Masayuki Uchiyama	November 18, 1992	November 8, 2000 (FUNimation) June 1, 2001 (Ocean)
As the battle between Trunks and Cell rages on, Cell reveals Trunks's weakness: in his ascended form, his new bulk slows him down. Goku, having ascended in the Hyperbolic Time Chamber, also realizes this. He plans to spend as much time as possible as a Super Saiyan to eliminate this weakness. Vegeta recovers, and returns to the island to resume his battle with Cell, with Krillin in tow. Upon their arriving however, Trunks informs them that Cell refuses to defeat him, but rather, plans to revive the World Martial Arts Tournament for a real challenge: he wants to fight anyone on Earth who thinks they have the strength to defeat him once and for all before he destroys it.
