= Dragon Ball Z season 6 =

Dragon Ball Z
- Season 6
- DVD release poster featuring Goku as a Super Saiyan
- No. of episodes: 29

Release
- Original network: Fuji Television
- Original release: November 25, 1992 – July 21, 1993

Season chronology
- ← Previous; Season 5 Next → Season 7

The sixth season of Dragon Ball Z anime series contains the Cell Games arc, which comprises Part 3 of the Cell Saga. The episodes are produced by Toei Animation, and are based on the final 26 volumes of the Dragon Ball manga series by Akira Toriyama.

The 29-episode season originally ran from November 1992 to July 1993 in Japan on Fuji Television. The first English airing of the series was on Cartoon Network where Funimation Entertainment's dub of the series ran from November 2000 to February 2001. The Ocean Dub first aired in the United Kingdom in September and October 2001, this dub also started airing in Canada from episode 18.

Funimation released the season in a box set on September 16, 2008, and in June 2009, announced that they would be re-releasing Dragon Ball Z in a new seven volume set called the "Dragon Boxes". Based on the original series masters with frame-by-frame restoration, the first set was released November 10, 2009.

== Episode list ==
No. overall	Initial dub no.	Translated title/Funimation's dub title Original Japanese title	Directed by	Written by	Animation directed by	Original release date	English air date
166	151	"A Final Battle Closes In on Goku!! The Mystery of the New Tenkaichi Tournament" / "What is the Tournament?"; Transliteration: "Gokū ni Semaru Daikessen!! Shin-Tenkaichi Budōkai no Nazo" (Japanese: 悟空に迫る大決戦!!新天下一武道会の謎)	Jun'ichi Fujise	Katsuyuki Sumisawa	Masahiro Shimanuki	November 25, 1992	November 9, 2000 (FUNimation) September 3, 2001 (Ocean)
Trunks tells the others about Cell's tournament. It will be held in nine days, which doesn't give them much time to prepare. Cell builds the tournament ring, and begins to get the word out about the Cell Games.
167	152	"100% Ratings!! The Cell Games Call Forth Death with an Exclusive Live Broadcast" / "The Doomsday Broadcast"; Transliteration: "Shichōritsu Hyaku Pāsento!! Shi o Yobu Seru Gēmu Dokusen Namahōsō" (Japanese: 視聴率100%!!死を呼ぶセルゲーム独占生放送)	Yamauchi Shigeyasu	Aya Matsui	Yukio Ebisawa	December 2, 1992	November 13, 2000 (FUNimation) September 4, 2001 (Ocean)
As Goku and Gohan continue to train in the Hyperbolic Time Chamber, Yamcha and Krillin begin to get ready for the Cell Games. Cell goes on television and announces his plan to the world. He challenges Earth's best fighters to beat him.
168	153	"Goku and Gohan... The Hero Father and Son's Ultimate Level-Up" / "Meet Me in the Ring"; Transliteration: "Gokū to Gohan... Hīrō Oyako Kyūkyoku Reberu Appu" (Japanese: 悟空と悟飯…ヒーロー親子究極レベルアップ)	Daisuke Nishio	Aya Matsui	Tadayoshi Yamamuro	December 9, 1992	November 14, 2000 (FUNimation) September 5, 2001 (Ocean)
Goku and Gohan finally emerge from the Hyperbolic Time Chamber, and Trunks gets them up to speed on what is happening. They decide that in the nine remaining days until the Cell Games, Piccolo will go in the Chamber first, followed by Vegeta, and finally Trunks. Goku decides that he and Gohan don't need another period of training in the Chamber, and will finish their training outside. Goku confronts Cell to size him up.
169	154	"Goku's Composure!? Let's Rest and Wait for the Cell Games" / "No Worries Here"; Transliteration: "Gokū no Yoyū!? Yasunde Matō Seru Gēmu" (Japanese: 悟空の余裕!?休んで待とうセルゲーム)	Mitsuo Hashimoto	Katsuyuki Sumisawa	Masayuki Uchiyama	December 16, 1992	November 15, 2000 (FUNimation) September 6, 2001 (Ocean)
Goku asks Korin to weigh his strength against Cell's, and the verdict is that Cell is still stronger than Goku. However, Goku does not seem worried by this at all. He seems to have a secret plan. Meanwhile, Cell begins to warm up for the tournament by flying into space and destroying some meteors. Goku sets out he and Gohan's training regimen, which is three days of rest, three days of training, and then three more days of rest.
170	155	"A Warrior's Rest... The Girl, the Lies, and Gohan's Resolution" / "A Girl Named Lime"; Transliteration: "Senshi no Kyūsoku... Shōjo to Uso to Gohan no Ketsui" (Japanese: 戦士の休息…少女と嘘と悟飯の決意)	Hiroki Shibata	Katsuyuki Sumisawa	Masahiro Shimanuki	January 13, 1993	November 16, 2000 (FUNimation) September 7, 2001 (Ocean)
As Goku continues to relax, Gohan goes into town and befriends a young girl named Lime. While there, he discovers that the villagers are panicked about Cell, and have built a shelter. Mr. Bourbon, the rich man who owns the shelter, hired General Tao to force the villagers to do what he says. Gohan is forced to step in and take him on.
171	156	"Hidden Power!! When Gohan Was a Baby" / "Memories of Gohan"; Transliteration: "Himerareta Chikara!! Gohan ga Akanbō datta Koro" (Japanese: 秘められた力!!悟飯が赤ン坊だった頃)	Yoshihiro Ueda	Aya Matsui	Yukio Ebisawa	January 20, 1993	November 20, 2000 (FUNimation) September 10, 2001 (Ocean)
Chi Chi reminisces about the story of how Gohan was named. Goku, Gohan, and Krillin relax by picking apples. Goku remembers an incident involving the tree and a baby Gohan. Later, they celebrate Gohan's birthday.
172	157	"Seek Out Kami-sama!! Goku's Great Instantaneous Movement" / "A New Guardian"; Transliteration: "Kamisama o Sagashidase!! Goku, Dai Shunkan Idō" (Japanese: 神様を探し出せ!!悟空、大瞬間移動)	Mitsuo Hashimoto	Sumio Uetake	Masayuki Uchiyama	January 27, 1993	November 21, 2000 (FUNimation) September 11, 2001 (Ocean)
Piccolo emerges from the Hyperbolic Time Chamber as a much more powerful warrior, and Vegeta takes his place inside to begin his training. As Cell awaits the start of the games, the Royal Military shows up to try and stop him. Of course, their attempts are futile, and Cell smites the entire force. Goku, wanting to bring all of these innocent people back to life, decides to locate the remaining Nameks and ask one of them to become the new guardian of Earth.
173	158	"Dende's First Task!! The Dragon Balls Restored" / "Dende's Dragon"; Transliteration: "Dende no Hatsu Shigoto!! Doragon Bōru Fukkatsu da" (Japanese: デンデの初仕事!!ドラゴンボール復活だ)	Masahiro Hosoda	Hiroshi Toda	Tadayoshi Yamamuro	February 3, 1993	November 22, 2000 (FUNimation) September 12, 2001 (Ocean)
Goku travels to the Nameks' new planet, and Dende decides to become the new guardian. Mr. Satan announces that he will be fighting against Cell in the Tournament. Once Dende arrives on Earth, he creates a new Dragon and a new set of Dragon Balls. This new Dragon will be able to grant three wishes at a time. Goku then begins to gather up the seven balls.
174	159	"A Hard Problem for Goku!? Take Back the Dragon Balls" / "The Puzzle of General Tao"; Transliteration: "Gokū ni Nanmon!? Doragon Bōru o Torimodose" (Japanese: 悟空に難問!?神龍球をとり戻せ)	Daisuke Nishio	Hiroshi Toda	Keisuke Masunaga	February 10, 1993	November 23, 2000 (FUNimation) September 13, 2001 (Ocean)
With the Cell Games right around the corner, Mr. Satan is busy attending rallies in his own support. Meanwhile, Goku is tracking down the last two Dragon Balls. He finds that General Tao is in possession of them. Rather than risk a fight that he knows he will lose, Tao challenges Goku to unlock three puzzle rings to earn his Dragon Balls. Finally, Goku gathers all seven Dragon Balls, and just in time, because the Cell Games are ready to start.
175	160	"Those Who Would Challenge Cell!! The Curtain Rises on the Battle" / "The Games Begin"; Transliteration: "Seru ni Idomu Mono Tachi!! Kessen no Makuake" (Japanese: セルに挑む者たち!!決戦の幕開け)	Kazuhito Kikuchi	Hiroshi Toda	Masahiro Shimanuki	February 17, 1993	November 27, 2000 (FUNimation) September 14, 2001 (Ocean)
The Cell Games have finally begun, and all of the Earth's fighters have come to take on the evil tyrant Cell. Mr. Satan shows up first, convinced that he will be the one to take down Cell.
176	161	"Just a Moment!! The Satan Squad Goes On the Rampage" / "Losers Fight First"; Transliteration: "Chotto Matta!! Satangundan Daiabare" (Japanese: ちょっと待った!!サタン軍団大暴れ)	Hiroki Shibata	Sumio Uetake	Yukio Ebisawa	March 3, 1993	November 28, 2000 (FUNimation) September 17, 2001 (Ocean)
Mr. Satan's students show up and decide to fight Cell first. Each of them is defeated with virtually no effort from Cell. Mr. Satan then steps in, and is defeated in a more "forceful" manner, with Cell pushing Mr. Satan aside... into the mountainside. Finally, Goku steps into the ring to fight Cell.
177	162	"Fight Time, Goku!! The Ultra-Tense Cell Games" / "Goku vs. Cell"; Transliteration: "Shōbu da Gokū!! Chō Kinpaku Seru Gēmu" (Japanese: 勝負だ悟空!!超緊迫セルゲーム)	Mitsuo Hashimoto	Katsuyuki Sumisawa	Ichirō Hattori	March 10, 1993	November 29, 2000 (FUNimation) September 18, 2001 (Ocean)
The fight between Cell and Goku begins, and the Earth begins to shake as they fight. After they finally land back on the ring, it is revealed that it was just their warm-up. Goku prepares to power up to full strength as the real battle is about to begin.
178	163	"Direct Hit to Earth!! Cell's Extra-Large Kamehame-Ha" / "Cell's Bag of Tricks"; Transliteration: "Chikyū Chokugeki!! Seru no Tokudai Kamehameha" (Japanese: 地球直撃!!セルの特大カメハメ波)	Yoshihiro Ueda	Katsuyuki Sumisawa	Masayuki Uchiyama	March 17, 1993	November 30, 2000 (FUNimation) September 19, 2001 (Ocean)
With Goku and Cell fully powered up, the battle begins, and as the match progresses, Cell realizes that they are very evenly matched, and so he resorts to trickery. First, he uses Tien's multi-form trick. Then he tries Piccolo's Special Beam Cannon and Frieza's final attack. Frustrated, he fires an incredibly powerful Kamehameha wave. Luckily, Goku is able to direct it away from the planet, and teleport back to the ring.
179	164	"Defeat or Death!? Goku's Turnabout Ploy" / "No More Rules"; Transliteration: "Haiboku ka Shi ka!? Gokū, Gyakuten no Hisaku" (Japanese: 敗北か死か!?悟空、逆転の秘策)	Daisuke Nishio	Hiroshi Toda	Keisuke Masunaga	March 31, 1993	December 4, 2000 (FUNimation) September 20, 2001 (Ocean)
The battle between Goku and Cell continues to heat up. Both of them seem to have even strength and speed. After Goku nearly falls out of the ring, Cell decides to destroy the ring and continue the fight with no rules. With nothing restricting them, the battle quickly intensifies, and as they fight, their power seems to increase. As they fight on, Goku decides to attempt to trick Cell by preparing a Kamehameha wave from up in the air. Cell doesn't believe that Goku would risk destroying the Earth, and so does nothing to defend himself. As the other fighters look on in horror, believing that Goku will release it from the air, Goku uses his Instant Transmission technique, and appears directly beneath Cell. He unleashes the wave directly into Cell's chest, and when the dust clears, Cell is severely maimed. It appears that Goku has won the tournament.
180	165	"A Conclusion to the Deathmatch!! Goku's Declaration of Surrender!?" / "The Fight is Over"; Transliteration: "Shitō ni Ketchaku!! Gokū no Kōsan Sengen!?" (Japanese: 死闘に決着!!悟空の降参宣言!?)	Atsutoshi Umezawa	Hiroshi Toda	Masahiro Shimanuki	April 7, 1993	December 5, 2000 (FUNimation) September 21, 2001 (Ocean)
As the dust clears, Cell's mangled body becomes visible. While the rest of the Z Fighters believe that they have won, Goku thinks differently. He senses that something is wrong when he can still feel a large amount of energy in what is left of Cell's body. Suddenly, Cell's body stands up, to the horror of virtually everybody, and regenerates the missing parts. Cell's energy has been depleted by the attack, but Goku's energy has been depleted more severely, and as the battle continues, it becomes clear that Goku is no match for Cell. Knowing that he cannot win, he declares that Cell is the winner. The Z Fighters, and Cell, cannot believe it.
181	166	"He Who Takes Over as Strongest... His Name is Gohan" / "Faith in a Boy"; Transliteration: "Saikyō o Tsugu Mono... Sono Na wa Gohan" (Japanese: 最強を継ぐ者…その名は悟飯)	Kazuhito Kikuchi	Hiroshi Toda	Masayuki Uchiyama	April 14, 1993	December 6, 2000 (FUNimation) September 24, 2001 (Ocean)
After Goku's shocking declaration, Cell claims victory over Earth. But, Goku says that Cell has one more competitor to fight. Cell has already fought and defeated Vegeta, Trunks, and Piccolo, and these three are supposed to be the strongest of the remaining fighters. Goku stuns everyone by selecting Gohan. He claims that Gohan's strength far exceeds his own. Despite the rest of the Z Fighters' protests, and even despite the fact that Goku willingly gives Cell one of their Senzu beans, Goku remains confident in Gohan's strength. Gohan then powers up and begins his battle with Cell.
182	167	"Become Enraged, Gohan — Call Forth Your Dormant Power" / "Gohan's Desperate Plea"; Transliteration: "Ikare Gohan Nemureru Chikara o Yobiokose" (Japanese: 怒れ悟飯眠れる力を呼び起せ)	Masahiro Hosoda	Hiroshi Toda	Yūji Hakamada	April 21, 1993	December 7, 2000 (FUNimation) September 25, 2001 (Ocean)
It appears that Cell has delivered the final blow to Gohan. But, Gohan is able to recover, and he looks more powerful than ever. He warns Cell that if he is pushed, an unbelievable power will be unleashed. He tells him about the time Raditz came to Earth and he was forced to let loose his amazing strength to save Goku. He also tells Cell about the time he had to do the same thing to save Krillin from Frieza. Instead of being scared by this, Cell is intrigued, and is determined to push Gohan to his limit so he can test himself against this awesome strength.
183	168	"Teeny Menaces!! Attack of the Cell Juniors" / "Android Explosion"; Transliteration: "Chitchana Kyōi!! Seru Junia Raishū" (Japanese: ちっちゃな脅威!!セルジュニア来襲)	Hiroki Shibata	Hiroshi Toda	Yukio Ebisawa	April 28, 1993	December 11, 2000 (FUNimation) September 26, 2001 (Ocean)
Cell begins to punish Gohan in every way he can think of in order to unleash his hidden power. He inflicts as much pain as he can on the young Saiyan warrior. As Cell is trying to crush Gohan, Android 16 jumps in and grabs Cell. He attempts to use the self-destruct explosive inside his chest, but finds that he cannot. Krillin reveals that Bulma removed it while repairing him. Cell destroys 16 with one blast, and then turns his attention on Gohan's friends. His tail opens up and seven tiny "Cell Juniors" pop out, one for each of the Z Fighters.
184	169	"The Tragic No. 16!! An Enraged Super Gohan Begins Taking Action" / "Cell Juniors Attack!" and "Children of Cell Attack"; Transliteration: "Jūrokugō Muzan!! Ugokidasu Ikari no Sūpā Gohan" (Japanese: 16号無惨!!動き出す怒りの超悟飯)	Mitsuo Hashimoto	Katsuyuki Sumisawa	Keisuke Masunaga	May 5, 1993	December 12, 2000 (FUNimation) September 27, 2001 (Ocean)
The Cell Juniors are attacking the Z Fighters, and there's nothing they can do to defend themselves. Only Trunks and Vegeta are able to remotely put up a fight. As they continue to beat up on them, Android 16's head rolls towards the camera crew, and makes his final wish: he asks Mr. Satan to bring him to Gohan. Running through the crossfire caused by Piccolo's "Rapid fire" technique, he throws 16's head towards Gohan. Once there, 16 tells Gohan that it is okay to fight if you're doing it for the right reasons, and to unleash his power. After he utters his final words, he is crushed by Cell. This is enough to push Gohan over the edge, and to transform into a Super Saiyan 2.
185	170	"Devastating True Power!! The Cell Juniors Pulverized" / "The Unleashing" and "Awakening"; Transliteration: "Fukiareru Shin no Pawā!! Seru Junia Funsai" (Japanese: 吹き荒れる真の力!!セルジュニア粉砕)	Yoshihiro Ueda	Katsuyuki Sumisawa	Tadayoshi Yamamuro	May 12, 1993	December 13, 2000 (FUNimation) September 28, 2001 (Ocean)
Gohan, angered by the destruction of Android 16, begins to ascend to a Super Saiyan 2. Cell initially thinks that Gohan is making the same mistake that Trunks did, by simply powering up. Eventually though, Gohan fully transforms into a Super Saiyan 2, to the amazement of the Z Fighters. Gohan is fully powered up now, to the delight of Cell, until Gohan snatches the bag of Senzu beans from Cell before he realizes it. With the beans in hand, he begins to attack the Cell Juniors. One by one, he destroys each of the Cell Juniors, each with a single blow. Trunks comments that he did the transformation right, increasing his strength without losing speed. When Gohan is finished destroying the Cell Juniors, he gives the senzu beans to Trunks, to distribute to the wounded Z Fighters, and moves on to Cell himself.
186	171	"Cell Gets KO'ed!! Just Two Super Ironfisted Blows" / "The Unstoppable Gohan"; Transliteration: "Seru o Nokkuauto!! Tatta Nihatsu no Chō Tekken" (Japanese: セルをKO（ノックアウト）!!たった2発の超鉄拳)	Daisuke Nishio	Katsuyuki Sumisawa	Masayuki Uchiyama	May 19, 1993	December 14, 2000 (FUNimation) October 1, 2001 (Ocean)
Cell and Gohan begin to fight, and from the start it is clear that Gohan is far superior to Cell. None of Cell's punches are landing, and Gohan doesn't even appear to be trying. Piccolo comments that the reason Goku fought Cell first was to show Gohan how Cell fights. Cell decides that he should fight at full strength. As he powers up, the Earth itself shakes. But even at full power, and delivering a quick blow to Gohan, Gohan is able to easily deliver two crushing blows to Cell, severely damaging Cell. It appears that Gohan has won, although Piccolo comments that it is not over yet.
187	172	"Something Amiss With Cell!! His Perfect Form Crumbles" / "Cell's Mighty Breakdown"; Transliteration: "Seru ni Ihen!! Kuzusareta Kanzentai" (Japanese: セルに異変!!崩された完全体)	Kazuhito Kikuchi	Katsuyuki Sumisawa	Masahiro Shimanuki	May 26, 1993	December 18, 2000 (FUNimation) October 2, 2001 (Ocean)
Gohan, no matter how many attacks Cell throws at him, is totally unfazed by Cell's attacks, and it looks more and more like Gohan will win the battle. Desperate, Cell aims a massive Kamehameha wave at the Earth, hoping to destroy it. Gohan counters this with an even bigger wave, which hits Cell, and dismembers him. Gohan starts to reveal the sadistic qualities of the Super Saiyan 2, preferring to let Cell suffer, despite Goku's protests that Gohan must destroy Cell now. Cell regenerates himself, and becomes enraged, and powers up to an extreme power level, but makes the same mistake that Trunks did, and is unable to hit Gohan due to his size. Gohan then delivers several crushing blows to Cell, including a kick to his gut, which eventually causes Cell to regurgitate Android 18.
188	173	"Bye-Bye, Everyone!! Goku's Last Instantaneous Movement" / "A Hero's Farewell"; Transliteration: "Bai Bai Minna!! Gokū Saigo no Shunkan Idō" (Japanese: バイバイみんな!!悟空最後の瞬間移動)	Masahiro Hosoda	Hiroshi Toda	Yūji Hakamada	June 2, 1993	December 19, 2000 (FUNimation) October 3, 2001 (Ocean)
With Android 18 no longer a part of Cell, he regresses to his imperfect form and finds himself absolutely no match for Gohan. Goku pleads with Gohan to end the battle immediately, but Gohan's new found arrogance causes him to simply toy with Cell. In desperation, Cell decides to blow himself up along with the planet, but Goku makes the ultimate sacrifice. He transports Cell to King Kai's planet, and they are destroyed in the blast. Goku has managed to save the Earth from certain doom...at the cost of his own life. As the Z Fighters are mourning the loss of their friend, and Gohan angered that his arrogance caused him to lose his father, Cell reappears and quickly kills Trunks with a single blast.
189	174	"A Nightmare in Broad Daylight!! The Terror Becomes Even More Perfect" / "Cell Returns!"; Transliteration: "Hakuchū no Akuma!! Kyōfu wa yori Kanpeki ni" (Japanese: 白昼の悪夢!!恐怖はより完璧に)	Hiroki Shibata	Aya Matsui	Yukio Ebisawa	June 16, 1993	December 20, 2000 (FUNimation) October 4, 2001 (Ocean)
Cell is returned once again in his super perfect form after regenerating from his own explosion. He reveals that one single cell was left after the explosion, and that was enough for him to return. Vegeta becomes enraged at the loss of his future son and attempts to take on Cell on his own. He unleashes a barrage of blasts at Cell, but is eventually tossed aside easily by the even more powerful Cell. Cell aims a blast at Vegeta, attempting to finish him off, but Gohan dives in front of him and takes the blast himself. Gohan survives, but is severely injured, losing the use of his left arm, and what's more, Krillin has no senzu beans left. Cell then begins to charge up a Kamehameha blast to destroy the Earth, and proclaims that he will live forever.
190	175	"From Goku to Gohan... The Spirit of the Father is Handed Down" / "The Horror Won't End"; Transliteration: "Gokū kara Gohan e... Chichi no Tamashii wa Tsutawatta" (Japanese: 悟空から悟飯へ…父の魂は伝わった)	Yamauchi Shigeyasu	Hiroshi Toda	Masayuki Uchiyama	June 23, 1993	December 21, 2000 (FUNimation) October 5, 2001 (Ocean)
Cell is finally through playing games, so he decides to take out Gohan and the Earth once and for all. While powering up his Kamehameha wave, he explains how he became Dr. Gero's "ultimate perfection". Gohan thinks this is the end of the Earth, but suddenly Goku begins to speak to him telepathically through King Kai. He tells Gohan that he has the strength and that he cannot give up. So, despite only being able to use one arm, Gohan powers up the biggest Kamehameha wave he can maneuver and aims it directly at Cell, just as Cell releases his wave.
191	176	"The Battle is Over... Thank You, Son Goku" / "Save the World"; Transliteration: "Tatakai wa Owatta... Arigatō Son Gokū" (Japanese: 戦いは終った…ありがとう孫悟空)	Kazuhito Kikuchi	Katsuyuki Sumisawa	Keisuke Masunaga	June 30, 1993	December 26, 2000 (FUNimation) October 8, 2001 (Ocean)
Gohan and Cell's waves collide, creating a crater in the Earth. As Gohan struggles to put all of his energy into his wave, Cell's wave begins to overtake his, despite the telepathic encouragement of Goku. Seeing that Gohan is losing, Piccolo comes to his aid and attacks Cell. Although the attack is deflected with no effort from Cell, he continues his efforts. Tien, Yamcha, and Krillin all join in, but it is all for nought. Just as it looks like Cell is going to win, Vegeta fires a giant beam directly at Cell, and this distraction is just enough for Gohan to make the final push and defeat Cell. The Super Perfect Android disintegrates into nothingness, thanks to Gohan's Kamehameha Wave, and the battle was won.
192	177	"I'm Going to Train In the Next World!! A Smile at Parting" / "Goku's Decision"; Transliteration: "Ora Ano Yo de Shugyō suru!! Egao no Wakare" (Japanese: オラあの世で修業する!!笑顔の別れ)	Daisuke Nishio	Katsuyuki Sumisawa	Yūji Hakamada	July 7, 1993	December 27, 2000 (FUNimation) October 9, 2001 (Ocean)
With Cell defeated, the Z Fighters head to the lookout to summon the dragon. This dragon is able to grant two wishes, but unfortunately Goku can't be wished back because he's already been brought back from the afterlife. Although they think of a way to revive him with the Namek’s Dragon Balls, Goku suddenly speaks to all of them through King Kai. He says that all of the trouble that has been caused on Earth is because of him. Frieza, the Androids, and Cell were all after him. He seems to be a magnet for trouble, so he decides to remain in the Other World for the Earth to be safe without Goku. Now they have one more wish left.
193	178	"New Days... Father! I'm Hanging In There" / "One More Wish"; Transliteration: "Atarashii Hibi... Tōsan! Boku Ganbaru" (Japanese: 新しい日々…父さん！ボクがんばる)	Masahiro Hosoda	Takao Koyama	Yukio Ebisawa	July 14, 1993	December 28, 2000 (FUNimation) October 10, 2001 (Ocean)
Because no one can think of a good wish, Krillin decides to use it to turn Android 18 into a human. However, Shenron says it is beyond his power to do that. Then Krillin wishes to take the explosives out of her, which Shenron accepts. After Trunks goes back to his own time, life returns to normal for the rest of the Z Fighters as Gohan tells Chi-Chi that Goku will not come back this time and Chi-Chi begins crying about her loss of his husband.
194	179	"One More Conclusion!! I Will Defend the Future" / "Free the Future"; Transliteration: "Mō Hitotsu no Ketsumatsu!! Mirai wa Ore ga Mamoru" (Japanese: もう一つの結末!!未来はオレが守る)	Hiroki Shibata	Hiroshi Toda	Masayuki Uchiyama	July 21, 1993	December 29, 2000 (FUNimation) October 11, 2001 (Ocean)
Back in his own time, Trunks decides it is time to end the fight once and for all. He finds Androids 17 and 18 and easily defeats them. Later, the Cell in Trunks' timeline attempts an ambush, but Trunks' foresight gives him an advantage. Trunks, being much more powerful than Cell, quickly dispatches him. The nightmare is finally over. Meanwhile, Goku and King Kai begin their journey to the Otherworld.
