= Dragon Ball Z: Battle of Z =

2014 video game

- Developer: Artdink
- Publisher: Bandai Namco Games (Note: Released under the Bandai brand name outside North America.)
- Composers: Shunsuke Kikuchi; Toshiyuki Kishi; Hisao Sasaki; Takao Nagatani
- Series: Dragon Ball
- Platforms: PlayStation 3, Xbox 360, PlayStation Vita
- Release: JP: January 23, 2014; EU: January 24, 2014; NA: January 28, 2014
- Genres: Fighting; Action role-playing
- Modes: Single-player, multiplayer

Dragon Ball Z: Battle of Z (ドラゴンボールZ BATTLE OF Z) is an action role-playing fighting game based on the Dragon Ball franchise. It was developed by Artdink and published by Bandai Namco Games. The game features elements from the 2013 Dragon Ball Z film, Battle of Gods, including the first appearance in a Dragon Ball video game of Goku's Super Saiyan God form, Beerus, and Whis.

== Gameplay ==
Battle of Z is a team fighting action title that lets up to eight players battle it out against one another. The game supports up to four players in cooperative play, and lets players perform attacks together and heal one another. It also supports online multiplayer battles, and PS Vita ad-hoc connection. A multiplayer restriction in this game is that two players can not play on the same console; the developers say this is due to wanting a player having the best possible graphics in full screen. Battle of Z features over 70 characters, as well as team battles against giant characters such as Great Ape Vegeta, Great Ape Gohan, and Hirudegarn.

The game features more than 70 characters. Instead of transformations grouped together into one character, they are separated into each transformation each. The pre-order offer comes in with two in-game DLC characters: Super Vegito and Super Saiyan Bardock, available via pre-order across Europe, America, and Australasia. Day 1 Edition includes a bonus DLC code for Super Saiyan Goku in Naruto Sage Mode costume.

The game's key feature is team battle action of four versus four. Teammates share a special energy meter called Genki Gauge. This meter increases when attacking opponents and, when filled, allows the character to perform an ultimate attack. Any of the teammates can decide to give or use energy from the gauge in order to perform an attack. Playable characters can team up to perform techniques such as Synchro Rush, Meteor Chain, and Revive Soul. Meteor Chain involves partners teaming up to launch attack after attack, following up each other's attacks and timing it so the opponent has no time to counter. Using Meteor Chains is an effective way to get the GENKI Gauge to fill up quickly. Synchro Rush is rushing the opponent at the same time, resulting in simultaneous hits. Revive Soul is reviving a fallen partner, giving them energy to get back in the battle. Also, thanks to Energy Share, teammates can share ki with each others. Villains can team up with Heroes in the game, but they do not show appreciation when given ki or extra energy to heal.

There are four different battle types for playable characters:

- Melee Type: skilled at close combat, can combo with melee attacks. Attack Type moves are Kaio-ken Attack, Dance of the Sword, Recoome Kick.
- Ki Blast Type: skilled at long range battle, can make consecutive attacks using the Genki Gauge. Ki Blast Type moves are Consecutive Energy Blast, Death Beam, Spirit Ball.
- Support Type: powers such as health regeneration and support abilities. Support Type moves are Health regain blast, Fighting Pose.
- Interfere Type: adept at abilities that interfere with the enemy's movements. Interference Type moves are Solar Flare, Chocolate Beam, Drain Energy.

There is a unique feature system that allows players to modify (edit) characters using ability/or customization cards. By collecting and equipping cards, characters that might not be suited to battle can be boosted to make them more capable, alternatively they can be given abilities that make their natural strengths more pronounced.

=== Modes ===
Game modes include Single Missions, Multi Missions, and Team Battles.

Single Mission

In this mode, it is possible to fight as either the Z Fighters or their antagonists. 60 missions are featured, ordered in Saiyan Saga (Z Fighters route and Saiyan route), Frieza Saga (Z Fighters route and Planet Trade Organization route), Cell Saga (Z Fighters route and Androids route), Majin Buu Saga (Z Fighters route and Majin Buu route), Another Age, Extra Age, and Special Age. The original manga/anime story is modified to include team battles, such as the fight with Frieza which, instead of Goku being the only character to face the tyrant, also includes Piccolo, Gohan, and Krillin for the final battle on Namek. Also included is a special history which is based on the Saiyans if something involving them had happened differently. Another scenario made for the game has a battle against all of Goku's family, including Bardock and Goten.

Co-op Battle

This mode allows four players to join online to complete missions in cooperation. It allows players who have difficulty to complete missions alone to find means to complete them online.

Battle Mode

This mode includes Shin Battle Mode and Battle Royal. Shin Battle Mode allows up to 4 players to join in order to complete missions in a competition, and Battle Royal allows the combatants to fight against each other not organized in teams. The game has four different battle modes- normal battle, score battle, Battle Royal, and Dragon Ball Grab.

Normal Battle

This is a standard 4-on-4 battle. Each team is allotted the ability to "Retry" a certain number of times after members are defeated. The first team who drops to 0 in the "Retry" count loses the game.

Score Battle

This is a 4-on-4 battle. To reach the highest score possible, each team has to knockout as many people as possible from the other team in a certain amount of time.

Battle Royal

This is a free-for-all, where every man is for himself. Each player will have to knockout the other and reach the highest score possible. All 8 players will battle for the same and unique crown.

Dragon Ball Grab

2 teams of 4 players will fight for the 7 Dragon Balls dispersed in the field. The first team who collects all of the Dragon Balls wins the game. If neither team manages to do that in the allotted time, the one having the highest number wins.

This mode only allows Internet or ad-hoc connection.

Character customization

Battle of Z brings back the feature to edit a character to make them the strongest character. It is shown that cards and card slots are the method for editing characters. Battle of Z introduces the feature to edit the color pattern of character's costume.

== Reception ==
Reception

Aggregate score
Aggregator	Score
Metacritic	(PS3): 54/100 (PSV): 66/100 (X360): 53/100

Review scores
Publication	Score
Famitsu	32/40
GameRevolution	(PS3): 3.5/5
GameSpot	4/10
GamesRadar+	1.5/5
IGN	6.6/10
HobbyConsolas	80%
Slant Magazine	2.5/5
Atomix	(X360): 50/100
Vandal	5/10

Dragon Ball Z: Battle of Z received mixed reviews, The Japanese magazine Famitsu gave 32/40 to all versions of the game with all four reviewers giving the game 8/10. PSU gave it 8/10, criticizing the lack of offline vs. and offline co-op modes. IGN gave an overall score of 6.6/10, criticizing the limited combat and the unbalanced teams in Battle Mode, while praising the visuals and the Co-op Mode. GameSpot gave this game a 4/10.

As of March 31, 2014, the game shipped 620,000 copies worldwide.
