= Dragon Ball Z season 2 =

Dragon Ball Z
- Season 2
- Cover for the Region 4 DVD release by Madman Entertainment featuring Goku
- No. of episodes: 35

Release
- Original network: Fuji Television
- Original release: March 14, 1990 – January 16, 1991

Season chronology
- ← Previous; Season 1 Next → Season 3

The second season of the Dragon Ball Z anime series contains the Namek and Captain Ginyu arcs, which comprises Part 1 of the Frieza Saga. The episodes are produced by Toei Animation, and are based on the final 26 volumes of the Dragon Ball manga series by Akira Toriyama.

The 35-episode season originally ran from March 1990 until January 1991 in Japan on Fuji Television. The first English dub of the season (the first 10 episodes only) was produced by Filipino company Creative Products Corporation, airing on RPN 9 in the Philippines during 1996. The first North American airing of the season was in first-run syndication, primarily on affiliate stations of Fox, The WB and UPN (United Paramount Network), where it ran from September 1997 until May 1998. On August 31, 1998, the first previously syndicated and heavily edited 53 (originally 67) episodes began airing on Cartoon Network's weekday-afternoon programming block, Toonami. The English dub of this season originally featured the third Dragon Ball Z film The Tree of Might as a three-part episode (it was dubbed and aired as if it were a part of the Television series). The episodes aired in a heavily edited, dubbed format released by Funimation Entertainment in association with Geneon (then known as Pioneer), Saban Entertainment and the Canadian dubbing studio Ocean Productions. This partnership ended after the first 67 episodes of the series, with Funimation doing their own in-house dub for the remainder of the series, after deciding to continue the English Dub of Dragon Ball Z after it became a ratings success on Toonami. Funimation dubbed the series starting at episode 67, using non-union Texas based voice actors, adding a new musical score, and doing less edits to the series content. Their dubs of the remainder of the second season aired in September 1999 on Toonami, with the company continuing to dub the rest of the series for Cartoon Network between 1999 and 2003. In August 2003, Geneon lost its home video distribution license for the first 67 episodes of the series, and it was relicensed by Funimation. The company redubbed these episodes, restoring the removed content and redoing the voice cast. The new dub aired on Cartoon Network in 2005, "replacing" the original Ocean voiced episodes.

Two pieces of theme music were used throughout the season. The opening theme, "Cha-La Head-Cha-La", is performed by Hironobu Kageyama and the ending theme, "Detekoi Tobikiri Zenkai Power!" (でてこいとびきりZENKAIパワー！, Detekoi Tobikiri Zenkai Pawā!) is performed by Manna. The theme for the original 1997–1998 English dub is "Rock the Dragon", performed by Jeremy Sweet. The uncut English redub from 2005 uses "Dragon Ball Z Uncut theme" by Dave Moran that was then replaced with the "Dragon Ball Z Movie theme" by Mark Menza for the remaster release of season 2.

Funimation released the season in a box set on May 22, 2007, and in June 2009, announced that they would be re-releasing Dragon Ball Z in a new seven volume set called the "Dragon Boxes". Based on the original series masters with frame-by-frame restoration, the first set was released November 10, 2009.

== Episode list ==
No. overall	Initial dub no.	Translated title/Original North American dub title[North American re-dub title] Original Japanese title	Directed by	Written by	Animation directed by	Original release date	English air date
40	29	"Honest to Goodness? There Lies Namek, Planet of Hope" / "Friends or Foes?" [Held Captive] Transliteration: "Honto ni Honto? Are ga Kibō no Namekkusei" (Japanese: ホントにホント？あれが希望のナメック星)	Mitsuo Hashimoto	Katsuyuki Sumisawa	Tomekichi Takeuchi	March 14, 1990	September 20, 1997; August 22, 2005 (re-dub)
Gohan and the others are captured by a band of space pirates, who think they are the lackies of a villain named Frieza, who sent some of his forces to take over their planet long ago. Suddenly, the station heads into an asteroid field, and Bulma runs toward the cockpit. She pushes the pilot out of the way, and guides the ship out of the asteroids safely. After realizing that they're not enemies, the pirates let Gohan, Krillin, and Bulma go.
41	29	"Kind-hearted Aliens – There's the Six Star Ball Already" / "Friends or Foes?" [Look Out Below] Transliteration: "Shinsetsu na Uchūjin – Ikinari Atta yo Ūshinchū" (Japanese: 親切な宇宙人いきなりあったよ五星球)	Minoru Okazaki	Keiji Terui	Minoru Maeda	March 21, 1990	September 20, 1997; August 23, 2005 (re-dub)
Thanks to the kids' help, Bulma uses a shortcut to get to Namek. After a crash landing on the planet's surface, two Namekians nurse them back to health. They offer to help the three in their search for the Dragon Balls.
42	30	"Planet Freeza No. 79 – Vegeta Recovers!!" / "Hunt for a Dragon Ball" [The Search Continues] Transliteration: "Wakusei Furīza Sebunti Nain – Fukkatsu no Bejīta!!" (Japanese: 惑星フリーザNO.79復活のベジータ!!)	Jōhei Matsuura	Aya Matsui & Takao Koyama	Masayuki Uchiyama	April 4, 1990	September 20, 1997; August 24, 2005 (re-dub)
As they continue their search for the Dragon Balls, with the Namekians' help, they get closer and closer to attaining all seven. Back on Earth, Goku escapes from the hospital and begins training. Meanwhile, Vegeta's ship has reached its destination, and doctors have begun their work on him.
43	31	"The Dragon Balls are All Found! Piccolo-san Will Also Come Back to Life" / "Who's Who?!" [A Friendly Surprise] Transliteration: "Sorotta zo Doragon Bōru! Pikkorosan mo Ikikaeru" (Japanese: そろったぞ神龍球！ピッコロさんも生き返る)	Yoshihiro Ueda	Katsuyuki Sumisawa	Mitsuo Shindō	April 11, 1990	September 27, 1997; August 25, 2005 (re-dub)
Gohan, Krillin, and Bulma are one Dragon Ball away from making their wish. But during their search for the seventh Dragon Ball, their two Namekian friends reveal that they are not Namekians at all. In fact, they're not even on Namek. Meanwhile, Vegeta learns that Frieza has traveled to Namek to gather the Dragon Balls. Not wanting to be beaten to the punch, Vegeta immediately blasts off for Namek.
44	32	"A Tough New Enemy! Freeza, Emperor of the Universe" / "Touchdown on Namek" [Brood of Evil] Transliteration: "Arata na Kyōteki! Uchū no Teiō Furīza" (Japanese: あらたな強敵！宇宙の帝王フリーザ)	Tatsuya Orime	Keiji Terui	Katsuyoshi Nakatsuru	April 18, 1990	September 27, 1997; August 29, 2005 (re-dub)
The two "Namekians" reveal that they have been stuck on this planet since their ship broke down, and they have been planning to steal Bulma's ship. They read their minds after her ship crashed, and so they projected images of Namekians over their true forms. Gohan, Bulma and Krillin, however, are able to escape the clutches of the two aliens, and continue their trip to Namek. After a long journey, Gohan and the others celebrate their arrival on Namek, but their party is cut short by the arrival of Vegeta. However, he's not even their worst problem, because Frieza is also on Namek.
45	33	"Vegeta's Ambition! I am the Greatest Warrior in the Universe!!" / "Face-off on Namek" [Frieza Strikes!] Transliteration: "Yabō no Bejīta! Uchūichi no Senshi wa Ore Da!!" (Japanese: 野望のベジータ！宇宙一の戦士はオレだ!!)	Yamauchi Shigeyasu	Katsuyuki Sumisawa	Masayuki Uchiyama	April 25, 1990	October 4, 1997; August 30, 2005 (re-dub)
Frieza and his henchmen are already in possession of four Dragon Balls. Frieza has learned of Vegeta's arrival, so he sends one of his henchmen, Cui, after him. Meanwhile, Gohan and Krillin sees two of Frieza's henchmen looking for the Dragon Balls, but they get beaten up easily. Cui believes that he is stronger than Vegeta, but hasn't calculated Vegeta's power after his time on Earth. The two engage in battle, but Cui is destroyed effortlessly.
46	34	"Goku's Power Unleashed!! Six Days to the Far End of the Galaxy" / "The Ruthless Frieza" [Defying Orders] Transliteration: "Gokū Pawā Zenkai!! Ginga no Hate made Muikakan" (Japanese: 悟空パワー全開!!銀河の果てまで6日間)	Mitsuo Hashimoto	Hiroshi Toda	Yukio Ebisawa	May 2, 1990	October 4, 1997; August 31, 2005 (re-dub)
With Bulma safely hiding in a cave, Gohan and Krillin fly to the nearby Namek village to investigate. Crouching behind a rock, they see Frieza and his henchmen trying to steal the fifth Dragon Ball. Back on Earth, Master Roshi tells Goku everything that happened on Namek and asks for Goku's help, but he's still not healed yet. Yajirobe arrives with a bag of Senzu beans for Goku. Now that he's healed, he flies to Capsule Corp. where Dr. Brief has made a replica of his spaceship, which includes a gravity chamber to train in on his way to Namek. Goku immediately blasts off for Namek.
47	35	"Surprise Attack!! The Elder's Target was the Scouters" / "The Nameks versus Frieza" [Namek's Defense] Transliteration: "Ihyō o Tsuita Kōgeki!! Chōrō no Nerai wa Sukautā" (Japanese: 意表をついた攻撃!!長老の狙いはスカウター)	Yoshihiro Ueda	Aya Matsui	Tomekichi Takeuchi	May 9, 1990	October 11, 1997; September 1, 2005 (re-dub)
The evil Frieza and his henchmen try to persuade the Namekian elder of the village to hand over the Dragon Ball by killing most of the villagers. Gohan, who can't watch the innocent Namekians get murdered anymore, is about to fly in and save them, when three more Namekians appear. These three are strong enough to defeat Frieza's weaker henchmen, so the evil tyrant sends one of his best fighters, Dodoria, after them.
48	36	"Gohan in Peril! A Pursuing Dodoria Summons Death" / "Escape from Dodoria" [The Hunted] Transliteration: "Gohan Ayaushi! Shi o Yobu Tsuisekisha Dodoria" (Japanese: 悟飯危うし！死を呼ぶ追跡者ドドリア)	Minoru Okazaki	Keiji Terui	Minoru Maeda	May 16, 1990	October 11, 1997; September 5, 2005 (re-dub)
Dodoria steps in to fight, and he easily kills the Namekian warriors. With no other choice, the elder gives the fifth ball to Frieza, but despite his cooperation, he and the Namekian boy, Cargo, are killed. Before Dodoria can finish off the last Namekian boy, Gohan loses control and steps in to save him. He grabs the boy and takes off, with Krillin at his side. Dodoria speeds off after them.
49	37	"Dodoria Dies by Explosion! Vegeta's Fearsome Shockwave" / "Secrets Revealed" [The Prince Fights Back] Transliteration: "Bakushi Dodoria! Bejīta no Osoru Beki Shōgekiha" (Japanese: 爆死ドドリア！ベジータの恐るべき衝撃波)	Yamauchi Shigeyasu	Katsuyuki Sumisawa	Masayuki Uchiyama	May 23, 1990	October 18, 1997; September 6, 2005 (re-dub)
By using Tien's Solar Flare technique, Krillin, Gohan, and the Namekian boy, Dende, are able to escape from Dodoria. As the pink alien tries to get back to Frieza, Vegeta shows up, ready to settle the score between him and Dodoria. Dodoria is taken by surprise by Vegeta's new strength, and the Saiyan Prince easily overpowers him. Pleading for his life, Dodoria barters information for his freedom. He tells Vegeta that it was actually Frieza, not an asteroid, that destroyed Planet Vegeta. Although taken aback at this new revelation, he kills Dodoria anyway.
50	38	"Escape From a Burning Planet!! A Life-or-Death Kamehame-Ha" / "A Collision Course" [Unexpected Problem] Transliteration: "Moeru Wakusei kara no Dasshutsu!! Inochigake no Kamehameha" (Japanese: 燃える惑星からの脱出!!命がけのカメハメ波)	Mitsuo Hashimoto	Hiroshi Toda	Mitsuo Shindō	May 30, 1990	October 18, 1997; September 7, 2005 (re-dub)
With Vegeta stronger, and Frieza afoot, Krillin is having doubts if he and the others will be able to collect the Dragon Balls. Bulma hears from her father that Goku is already on his way to Namek. Meanwhile, Goku is training aboard his spaceship at 20x the earth's gravity. Suddenly, an asteroid collides with his ship, which aims it directly into a star. Goku is forced to summon every ounce of strength that he has in order to blast his ship back on course. No longer needing a scouter to sense energy, Vegeta quickly finds the next Dragon Ball. Vegeta threatens the elder, another Namekian jumps in to protect his elder and dies.
51	39	"Courage Times One Hundred! The Warriors Gathered Under Kaio" / "Stay Away From Frieza" [Vegeta Has a Ball] Transliteration: "Yūki Hyakubai! Kaiō no Moto ni Shūketsu Suru Senshitachi" (Japanese: 勇気百倍！界王の下に集結する戦士たち)	Yoshihiro Ueda	Aya Matsui	Yukio Ebisawa	June 6, 1990	October 25, 1997; September 12, 2005 (re-dub)
Vegeta wipes out the entire village and takes the Dragon Ball. He then hides the Dragon Ball in the water nearby, for safekeeping. Sensing the nearby destruction, Krillin and Gohan deduce that Vegeta has found the sixth Dragon Ball. With only one left, Dende and Krillin take off toward the Namekian leader, Guru. It is this Eldest Namekian who holds the seventh Dragon Ball. Meanwhile King Kai tells Goku that his friends have made it to his place and to not face Frieza.
52	39	"Listen to Me, Goku! Hands Off Freeza" / "Stay Away From Frieza" [The Past and Future] Transliteration: "Kike Gokū yo! Furīza ni wa Te o Dasu na" (Japanese: 聞け悟空よ！フリーザには手を出すな)	Mitsuo Hashimoto	Katsuyuki Sumisawa	Mitsuo Shindō	June 20, 1990	October 25, 1997; September 13, 2005 (re-dub)
As Goku steps up his training, King Kai tells him that Yamcha, Tien, Chiaotzu, and Piccolo have come to train with him. However, King Kai has discovered that Frieza is on Namek, and warns Goku not go near him. Back on Namek, as Krillin and Dende head towards the Eldest Namek, Zarbon, one of Frieza's high-level henchmen, finds Vegeta, and intends to destroy him. Vegeta shows off his newfound strength by easily beating him up. However, Zarbon claims he has a trick up his sleeve.
53	40	"Nothing but Goosebumps! The Handsome Warrior Zarbon's Devilish Transformation" / "Zarbon Transformed" [Zarbon's Surprise] Transliteration: "Hotondo Torihada! Bisenshi Zābon no Akuma no Henshin" (Japanese: ほとんど鳥肌！美戦士ザーボンの悪魔の変身)	Yamauchi Shigeyasu	Hiroshi Toda	Masayuki Uchiyama	June 27, 1990	October 25, 1997; September 14, 2005 (re-dub)
Realizing he is no match for Vegeta's increased power, Zarbon has no choice but to reveal his true power, transforming into a hideous reptilian beast. In this form, he is far more powerful, and begins to pound Vegeta. With a mighty stroke, he blasts Vegeta to the bottom of a lake, and he is presumed dead.
54	41	"Defend the Star of Hope!! Kuririn's Astonishing Power-Up" / "The Eldest Namek" [Guru's Gift] Transliteration: "Kibō no Hoshi o Mamore!! Kuririn Kyōi no Pawā Appu" (Japanese: 希望の星を守れ!!クリリン驚異のパワーUP)	Minoru Okazaki	Keiji Terui	Tomekichi Takeuchi	July 4, 1990	November 1, 1997; September 15, 2005 (re-dub)
Once they finally arrive at their destination, Krillin and Dende meet the Eldest Namek, Guru, and his bodyguard Nail, who closely resembles Piccolo. The wise old Namekian gives Krillin the last Dragon Ball, and, upon seeing that he is pure-hearted, unlike Frieza, also awakens hidden powers within him. As Krillin heads back to the others, Zarbon informs Frieza that he killed Vegeta. When Frieza finds out that Zarbon only assumes that Vegeta is dead, he makes him go back and find Vegeta. Zarbon arrives at their battle site, pulls Vegeta out of the water, and brings him back to Frieza's ship. Dende arrives and tells Nail what has happened.
55	42	"Back from the Brink of Death – The Miracle Man, Vegeta" / "Get Vegeta!" [Piccolo vs. Everyone] Transliteration: "Shi no Fuchi kara Yomigaetta – Kiseki no Otoko – Bejīta" (Japanese: 死の淵からよみがえった奇跡の男・ベジータ)	Tatsuya Orime	Keiji Terui	Masayuki Uchiyama	July 18, 1990	November 1, 1997; September 19, 2005 (re-dub)
As Goku trains harder for Namek, Yamcha, Tien, and Chiaotzu complete King Kai's first test. Even Piccolo helps out on the second test. Back on Namek, Frieza's men are working to revive Vegeta, but he's still unconscious from his battle with Zarbon. Meanwhile, Krillin is still on his way back to Gohan and Bulma.
56	43	"An Enormous Battle Power!! Freeza's Scheme is Shattered" / "Vegeta Revived" [Zarbon's Mission] Transliteration: "Dodekai Sentōryoku!! Kudakechiru Furīza no Inbō" (Japanese: どでかい戦闘力!!砕け散るフリーザの陰謀)	Yoshihiro Ueda	Katsuyuki Sumisawa	Yukio Ebisawa	August 1, 1990	November 8, 1997; September 20, 2005 (re-dub)
Vegeta has recovered, and with no one watching him, he breaks out of his medical chamber and hides. He creates a diversion to get Frieza and Zarbon away from the five Dragon Balls. He goes into the main control room that contains the Dragon Balls, blasts a hole in the ship, and escapes. Furious over the loss of the Dragon Balls, Frieza orders Zarbon to find Vegeta and the Dragon Balls in one hour, or he will die. Vegeta finds a suitable hiding spot for the five Dragon Balls. He knows that Frieza and his henchmen have no scouters and can't sense energy signals, so they won't be able to find the five balls without combing the entire surface of the planet.
57	44	"I'm Back to My Old Self Again!! Goku Under 100-Times Super-Gravity" / "A Heavy Burden" [Gohan, the Hunted] Transliteration: "Genki ga Modotta zo!! Hyakubai Chōjūryoku no Naka no Gokū" (Japanese: 元気が戻ったぞ!!100倍超重力の中の悟空)	Yamauchi Shigeyasu	Takao Koyama	Mitsuo Shindō	August 8, 1990	November 8, 1997; September 21, 2005 (re-dub)
Gohan suddenly senses an energy signal from the village that Vegeta destroyed earlier, and goes to check it out. Krillin arrives back at the cave to give Bulma the good news, however, Zarbon and Vegeta followed him. They see that he has a Dragon Ball, and they decide to fight each other for it. Zarbon thinks that the fight will be as easy as it was the last time, but he doesn't know that a Saiyan's strength increases after he recovers from injury, and Vegeta makes short work of him. He then takes Krillin's Dragon Ball back to where he hid the other five. Meanwhile, Goku's ship hits a magnetic storm, which makes the gravity machine malfunction, causing it to increase the gravity to 100x normal. Though he can barely move, Goku sees this as a new challenge, and begins to train under the intense gravity.
58	45	"Freeza's Secret Weapon! The Devilish Ginyu Special Corps" / "Immortality Denied" [Unknown Enemies] Transliteration: "Furīza no Himitsu Heiki! Akuma no Ginyū Tokusentai" (Japanese: フリーザの秘密兵器！悪魔のギニュー特戦隊)	Mitsuo Hashimoto	Hiroshi Toda	Tomekichi Takeuchi	August 22, 1990	November 15, 1997; September 22, 2005 (re-dub)
With both of his main henchmen killed by Vegeta, Frieza summons his elite fighting squad, the Ginyu Force. Meanwhile, Gohan finds the Dragon Ball Vegeta hid underwater, and heads back to the cave with it. However, he notices Vegeta on his way back and drops to the ground, hiding until Vegeta threatens to blow the surrounding area to pieces. Gohan reveals himself and is able to keep Vegeta from realizing that the last dragon ball is hiding right behind him. Amazed at his luck, Gohan brings the Dragon Ball back to Krillin and Bulma. He and Krillin then take off toward Guru's place, leaving the Dragon Ball in Bulma's possession. They hope that Guru will awaken Gohan's hidden power. Vegeta returns to the village and discovers his dragon ball is missing and realizes that Gohan had taken it (also he draws a conclusion about the dragon radar), furious he returns to the cave but was too late as Gohan, Krillin and Bulma had already left.
N–A	46 (Episodic Version of a Dragon Ball Z Movie of the same name)	"The Decisive Battle for the Entire Earth" / "The Tree of Might: Episode 1"; Transliteration: "Chikyū Marugoto Chōkessen" (Japanese: 地球まるごと超決戦)	Daisuke Nishio; Storyboarded by : Daisuke Nishio, Shigeyasu Yamauchi, Yoshihiro Ueda, Mitsuo Hashimoto & Tatsuya Orime	Takao Koyama	Minoru Maeda	N/A	November 15, 1997
Gohan, Krillin, Bulma, and Oolong are spending a peaceful day camping, but that night a huge fire breaks out in the nearby forest. Using their ki, Krillin and Gohan put out the fire and use the Dragon Balls to restore the forest. Unbeknownst to our heroes, the fire was started by a space probe landing. The next morning the space pod begins scouting the area and it is soon revealed that it was sent by a Saiyan, Turles, who has chosen the Earth to plant the Tree of Might. The Tree absorbs the world's energy, storing it in its fruit, and whoever eats it is granted godlike power. Turles' minions land and create a fissure in the earth to plant the seed. Meanwhile, Gohan becomes friends with a Dragon saved from the forest fire. Note: This is an episodic version of the Dragon Ball Z movie of the same name. It only appears as part of the edited Saban dub.
N–A	47 (Episodic Version of a Dragon Ball Z Movie of the same name)	"The Decisive Battle for the Entire Earth" / "The Tree of Might: Episode 2"; Transliteration: "Chikyū Marugoto Chōkessen" (Japanese: 地球まるごと超決戦)	Daisuke Nishio; Storyboarded by : Daisuke Nishio, Shigeyasu Yamauchi, Yoshihiro Ueda, Mitsuo Hashimoto & Tatsuya Orime	Takao Koyama	Minoru Maeda	N/A	November 22, 1997
King Kai recognizes the Tree of Might and warns Goku of the Earth's imminent devastation if he doesn't destroy it immediately. Earth's Special Forces head out, but their attacks don't even leave a scratch on the Tree. Turles' minions soon appear and a battle breaks out as Turles watches on from their space ship. Earth's Special Forces attack with all they have, but it soon become apparent they are no match. Turles soon notices the young Saiyan Gohan and appears before him, trying to convince him to join him and help him conquer the universe. Gohan refuses, so Turles decides to kill him, but Piccolo intervenes. Unfortunately he is no match for the Saiyan and is sent flying. When he saw Gohan's tail grew back, Turles decides to have a little fun and creates an artificial moon, forcing Gohan to look at it and transform. Goku notices this and comes to help, only to be attacked by Gohan in Great Ape form. Goku eventually manages to sever his tail and return him to normal. Note: This is an episodic version of the Dragon Ball Z movie of the same name. It only appears as part of the edited Saban dub.
N–A	48 (Episodic Version of a Dragon Ball Z Movie of the same name)	"The Decisive Battle for the Entire Earth" / "The Tree of Might: Episode 3"; Transliteration: "Chikyū Marugoto Chōkessen" (Japanese: 地球まるごと超決戦)	Daisuke Nishio; Storyboarded by : Daisuke Nishio, Shigeyasu Yamauchi, Yoshihiro Ueda, Mitsuo Hashimoto & Tatsuya Orime	Takao Koyama	Minoru Maeda	N/A	November 22, 1997
Enraged at Turles abuse of Gohan, Goku quickly defeats Turles' minions and heads off to take on Turles. Goku and Turles' one-on-one showdown begins and Goku has Turles on the ropes. However, the fruit of the Tree has finally developed and Turles grabs one, taking a bite. With the sudden surge of power, Turles quickly turns the tables on Goku, but Earth's Special Forces come to his aid. As they take on Turles, Goku begins to form a Spirit Bomb, but the Earth barely has any energy left. Energy from the Tree suddenly flows into Goku and the Spirit Bomb is complete. With the remaining heroes defeated, Goku confronts Turles and each unleashes their final attack. Goku's Spirit Bomb overwhelms Turles' ki attack and hits him head on, sending him flying through the Tree. The massive Spirit Bomb destroys the Tree of Might and its energy is returned to Earth. With peace returned, our heroes enjoy another camping trip. Note: This is an episodic version of the Dragon Ball Z movie of the same name. It only appears as part of the edited Saban dub.
59	46	"Watch Out, Bulma!! The Si Xing Qiu Falls into Freeza's Clutches" / "Big Trouble for Bulma" [Destination: Guru] Transliteration: "Buruma ga Abunai!! Sūshinchū wa Furīza no Te ni" (Japanese: ブルマが危ない!!四星球はフリーザの手に)	Jōhei Matsuura	Aya Matsui	Masayuki Uchiyama	August 29, 1990	January 31, 1998; September 26, 2005 (re-dub)
As Gohan and Krillin head to Guru's place to awaken Gohan's hidden powers, they leave Bulma behind to look after the Dragon Ball. Frustrated at his loss of five of the Dragon Balls, Frieza begins firing powerful energy blasts all over the surface of Namek. These explosions cause the Dragon Ball to roll away from Bulma and into the water nearby. Bulma takes her submarine into the water to find the lost ball, but there she finds more than she bargained for. As she reaches for the ball, a giant crab thinks she is trying to steal her eggs, and begins to attack Bulma. Bulma saves the crab from a falling rock, and the crab gives her the Dragon Ball.
60	47	"Charge!! The Kaio-ken and Kamehame-Ha of an Indomitable Spirit" / "Scramble for the Dragon Balls!" [Bulma's Big Day] Transliteration: "Gekitotsu da!! Fukutsu no Tōshi no Kaiōken to Kamehameha" (Japanese: 激突だ!!不屈の闘志の界王拳とカメハメ波)	Yoshihiro Ueda	Katsuyuki Sumisawa	Mitsuo Shindō	September 5, 1990	February 7, 1998; September 27, 2005 (re-dub)
Bulma finally retrieves the Dragon Ball, only to be captured by two of Frieza's henchmen. She persuades them into find the rest of the Dragon Balls and making a wish themselves. Knowing she has more Dragon Ball knowledge than the two of them, they take her along. She leads them into the water, and right to the giant crab, who eats both of them.
61	48	"The Great Battle Approaches! Ginyu's Special Corps Takes the Stage!!" / "Arrival of the Ginyu Force" [Hidden Power] Transliteration: "Semaru Chō-Kessen! Ginyū Tokusentai Tadaima Sanjō!!" (Japanese: 迫る超決戦！ギニュー特戦隊只今参上!!)	Tatsuya Orime	Katsuyuki Sumisawa	Yukio Ebisawa	September 12, 1990	February 7, 1998; September 28, 2005 (re-dub)
Krillin and Gohan finally make it to Guru's place, but Vegeta has followed them, determined to get the last Dragon Ball. As Krillin tries to hold off Vegeta, Gohan has his hidden powers unleashed. Suddenly, they all sense an incredibly powerful force arriving on the planet. Vegeta recognizes it as the Ginyu Force. He tells Krillin and Gohan that the Ginyu Force is far more powerful even than himself. Vegeta says that if they are to defeat them and prevent Frieza from making his wish, they must work together.
62	49	"Goku on Final Approach! Smash Through Freeza's Dragnet" / "Elite Fighters of the Universe... The Ginyu Force" [New Ally, New Problem] Transliteration: "Gokū ga Daisekkin! Furīza no Hōimō o Buchiyabure" (Japanese: 悟空が大接近！フリーザの包囲網をぶち破れ)	Jun'ichi Fujise; Storyboarded by : Yamauchi Shigeyasu	Keiji Terui	Masayuki Uchiyama	September 19, 1990	February 14, 1998; September 29, 2005 (re-dub)
The Ginyu Force arrives on Namek. They are five incredibly powerful warriors named Guldo, Jeice, Recoome, Burter, and Captain Ginyu. These five fighters specialize in making flashy poses. Frieza tells them what the Dragon Balls are, and sends them after Vegeta. He tells Captain Ginyu to use his scouter to find the Dragon Balls while the other four deal with Vegeta. Meanwhile, Krillin is very reluctant to join forces with Vegeta, but Gohan knows that Goku would do it, so he convinces Krillin to help. The Ginyu Force quickly finds where Vegeta and the others are, and are prepared to fight.
63	50	"Super-Magic or Just a Trick!? Mr. Ghurd is Angry!" / "Time Tricks and Body Binds" [Guldo's Mind Binds] Transliteration: "Chōmajutsu ka Torikku ka!? Misutā Gurudo ga Okotta zo!" (Japanese: 超魔術かトリックか!?Mr.グルドが怒ったぞ！)	Kazuhito Kikuchi	Hiroshi Toda	Tomekichi Takeuchi	September 26, 1990	February 14, 1998; October 3, 2005 (re-dub)
The weakest member of the Ginyu Force, Guldo, steps up to fight against the powered up Krillin and Gohan. Guldo quickly discovers that both Krillin and Gohan are far more powerful than he is, so he uses his special technique: he holds his breath, stopping time. Krillin and Gohan swoop in for the final blow several times, but every time Guldo stops time, and runs to a different location. He then reveals another trick: he uses his mysterious power to completely bind Krillin and Gohan. Unable to move, they are at the mercy of Guldo. Having seen enough, Vegeta steps in and quickly annihilates Guldo.
64	51	"The Savage ReaCoom!! He's Bad, He's Strong, He's Outrageous" / "No Refuge From Recoome" [Recoome Unleashed] Transliteration: "Mōi Rikūmu!! Warukute Tsuyokute Tondemonai Yatsu" (Japanese: 猛攻リクーム!!悪くて強くてとんでもない奴)	Minoru Okazaki	Hiroshi Toda	Masaki Satô	October 24, 1990	May 16, 1998; October 4, 2005 (re-dub)
The next fighter from the Ginyu Force is the massive Recoome. Vegeta pulls out all the stops, but he is no match for Recoome. The giant begins to toy with Vegeta, despite the pleas from the remaining members of the Ginyu Force. With Vegeta out of commission, Krillin steps in to save him. Though he does his best, he is easily defeated.
65	52	"Don't Die, Gohan! Goku Finally Touches Down on the Battlefield" / "Enter Goku" [Let the Battle Begin] Transliteration: "Shinu na Gohan! Gokū, Tsui ni Kessenjō ni Tōchaku Da" (Japanese: 死ぬな悟飯！悟空、ついに決戦場に到着だ)	Yoshihiro Ueda	Katsuyuki Sumisawa	Mitsuo Shindō	October 31, 1990	May 23, 1998; October 5, 2005 (re-dub)
Since Krillin and Vegeta can't fight anymore, Gohan is the only one left to fight. Captain Ginyu, leader of the Force, locates all seven Dragon Balls, and brings them to Frieza. Frieza tries to make his wish, but realizes he doesn't know what to do. He figures there must be a password. Meanwhile, Gohan gives it everything he has against Recoome, but the giant warrior is too strong. Just as he is about to finish off Gohan, everyone senses a gigantic power arriving on the planet. Krillin, Gohan, and Vegeta realize it is Goku.
66	53	"Uncommon Strength!! Son Goku, the Legendary Super Saiyan" / "Goku... Super Saiyan?" [Goku's New Power] Transliteration: "Ketahazure no Tsuyosa!! Densetsu no Sūpā Saiyajin Son Gokū" (Japanese: ケタ外れの強さ!!伝説の超サイヤ人孫悟空)	Tatsuya Orime	Katsuyuki Sumisawa	Yukio Ebisawa	November 7, 1990	May 23, 1998; October 6, 2005 (re-dub)
Goku has finally arrived on Namek, and finds Krillin, Gohan and Vegeta near death. He gives them all a Senzu bean, and prepares to fight the Ginyu Force. With a single blow to the gut, he puts Recoome out of commission. Goku's training at 100x normal gravity has exponentially increased his strength.
67	53	"Lightning Balls of Red and Blue! Jheese and Butta Attack Goku" / "Goku... Super Saiyan?" [A Legend Revealed] Transliteration: "Aka to Ao no Raitoningu Bōru! Jīsu to Bāta ga Gokū o Osō" (Japanese: 赤と青の光球！ジースとバータが悟空を襲う)	Daisuke Nishio	Aya Matsui	Masayuki Uchiyama	November 14, 1990	May 23, 1998; October 10, 2005 (re-dub)
With Recoome beaten by one punch, the remaining two Ginyu Force members, Burter and Jeice, fight against Goku, but none of their speed attacks work against him. They try to hit him, but their punches seem to go through Goku. He is dodging so fast that it appears he isn't even moving. Vegeta believes that Goku has become the legendary Saiyan warrior, the Super Saiyan. If this is true, Goku would be the first Super Saiyan in millennia.
68	54	"At Last, a Direct Confrontation!! Captain Ginyu Takes the Field" [Ginyu Assault] Transliteration: "Tsui ni Chokusetsu Taiketsu!! Ginyū Taichō no Odemashi Da" (Japanese: ついに直接対決!!ギニュー隊長のおでましだ)	Jun'ichi Fujise	Keiji Terui	Masahiro Shimanuki	November 21, 1990	September 13, 1999
Goku easily beats Burter. Frightened, Jeice flies away to get Captain Ginyu. Vegeta then executes both Recoome and Burter, despite Goku's pleas. Meanwhile, Frieza heads off towards Guru's place, hoping to discover the secret to using the Dragon Balls. Goku, Vegeta, Krillin, and Gohan all sense that Frieza is on the move, but the Dragon Balls remain in their place. They recognize that this might be their only chance to make their wish.
69	55	"Incredible Force!! Did You See Goku's Full Power?" [Incredible Force!] Transliteration: "Susamajii Hakuryoku!! Mita ka, Gokū no Furu Pawā" (Japanese: 凄まじい迫力!!見たか、悟空のフルパワー)	Minoru Okazaki	Aya Matsui	Mitsuo Shindō	November 28, 1990	September 13, 1999
Once Captain Ginyu arrives, Vegeta leaves Goku behind to get the Dragon Balls for himself. Krillin and Gohan leave to get the Dragon Radar from Bulma so they can find the Balls before Vegeta. Jeice tells Captain Ginyu how powerful Goku is, but the Captain is confident he can beat him. Goku decides to skip the warmup and power up to his full strength immediately. As he is powering up, Jeice measures his power level on his scanner. He is shocked as the level continues to climb higher and higher, eventually surpassing Captain Ginyu's maximum. Captain Ginyu doesn't believe the scanner, and begins to fight with Goku.
70	56	"What of the Battle's Outcome!? Freeza's Evil Hand Closes Around the Grand Elder" [Frieza Approaches] Transliteration: "Tatakai no Yukue!? Saichōrō ni Semaru Furīza no Ma no Te" (Japanese: 闘いの行方!?最長老に迫るフリーザの魔の手)	Yoshihiro Ueda	Aya Matsui	Minoru Maeda	December 5, 1990	September 14, 1999
Goku is obviously more powerful than Ginyu, but the Captain won't give up so easily. Meanwhile, Guru sends Dende to tell Krillin and Gohan the password to use the Dragon Balls. Frieza arrives at Guru's place, demanding to know the Dragon Balls' password. The last three Namekians arrive as well. But despite Nail's pleas, they about to fight Frieza, but the tyrant easily kills them. Though Nail informs him that the Dragon Balls would disappear, following Guru's death, Frieza confronts Guru to get the password anyway.
71	57	"Surprise!! Goku is Ginyu and Ginyu is Goku" [Goku is Ginyu and Ginyu is Goku] Transliteration: "Bikkuri!! Gokū ga Ginyū de Ginyū ga Gokū" (Japanese: ビックリ!!悟空がギニューでギニューが悟空)	Tatsuya Orime	Aya Matsui	Yukio Ebisawa	December 12, 1990	September 15, 1999
Nail leads Frieza away from Guru's place so that he can't get hurt. He starts fighting Frieza, but it seems that he was unable to hold him up though he does to give time for Dende to deliver the Dragon Balls' password to the Z fighters. Gohan and Krillin get the Dragon Radar from Bulma and head towards Frieza's spaceship. Meanwhile, Goku is winning his fight against Captain Ginyu. Realizing he can't win, Captain Ginyu decides to use his special power: the Body Change. He severely wounded himself to Goku's horror, and shoots a beam of light out of his mouth and into Goku's: the two switch bodies. Ginyu, as Goku, then flies back towards Frieza's spaceship, leaving Goku in Ginyu's thrashed body behind.
72	58	"Come Forth, Super Shen Long!! Grant Me My Wish" [Calling the Eternal Dragon] Transliteration: "Ide yo Sūpā Shenron!! Boku no Negai o Kanaetamae" (Japanese: 出でよ超神龍!!ボクの願いをかなえたまえ)	Mitsuo Hashimoto	Aya Matsui	Masayuki Uchiyama	December 19, 1990	September 16, 1999
Krillin and Gohan arrive at Frieza's spaceship and locate the Dragon Balls, unaware that Vegeta is not far away. As the two try to figure out what the password is, Jeice and Captain Ginyu, in Goku's body, arrive as well. The disguised Ginyu tries to trick Krillin into believing that he is Goku. Gohan, however, realizes that it is not the real Goku. Goku, in Captain Ginyu's destroyed body, arrives, and tells Krillin and Gohan what happened. Now it is up to Gohan and Krillin to defeat Captain Ginyu.
73	59	"That Ain't Me! Gohan, Don't Lose Your Nerve, Hit Your Father!!" [Gohan, Defeat Your Dad!] Transliteration: "Yatsu wa Ora ja Nē! Gohan Bibiru na Chichi o Ute!!" (Japanese: 奴はオラじゃネェ！悟飯びびるな父を撃て!!)	Daisuke Nishio	Hiroshi Toda	Mitsuo Shindō	January 9, 1991	September 17, 1999
Ginyu tries to power up with Goku's body, but it turns out that Goku's right, Ginyu can't reach Goku's body's full potential, because he doesn't know how to unite body and mind. But even at a relatively low power, he can still overpower both Krillin and Gohan. Vegeta arrives, and begins to fight Jeice. Having recovered from severe injury, Vegeta has greatly increased his power, and easily overpowers and kills Jeice.
74	60	"Whoops!! Ginyu Has Turned Into a Frog" [Captain Ginyu... The Frog] Transliteration: "Daigosan!! Ginyū ga Kaeru ni Natchatta" (Japanese: 大誤算!!ギニューがカエルになっちゃった)	Yoshihiro Ueda	Katsuyuki Sumisawa	Masayuki Uchiyama	January 16, 1991	September 20, 1999
Realizing that he's no match for the renewed Vegeta, Captain Ginyu decides to use his body-switching trick on him. Once again, he lets his body get thrashed, so his opponent will be very weak after the switch. Just as Captain Ginyu uses the trick, Goku recognizes the move and intercepts the light beam, switching back into his old body. Back in his broken body, Captain Ginyu tries to switch with Vegeta again. Goku throws a frog to intercept the transfer. The frog, in Ginyu's body, hops into the water, while Ginyu, in the frog's body, flees. With the Ginyu Force defeated, Goku recovers in an isolation chamber in Frieza's spaceship. Vegeta gives Krillin and Gohan battle armour before their upcoming fight with Frieza.
