= Dragon Ball Z season 1 =

Dragon Ball Z
- Season 1
- DVD release poster featuring Vegeta
- No. of episodes: 39

Release
- Original network: Fuji Television
- Original release: April 26, 1989 – March 7, 1990

Season chronology
- ← Previous; Dragon Ball Next → Season 2

The first season of the Dragon Ball Z anime series contains the Raditz and Vegeta arcs, which comprises the Saiyan Saga, which adapts the 17th through the 21st volumes of the Dragon Ball manga series by Akira Toriyama. The series follows the adventures of Goku. The episodes deal with Goku as he learns about his Saiyan heritage and battles his older brother Raditz, Nappa, and the Saiyan Prince Vegeta, three other Saiyans who want Goku to join them and help them destroy life on Earth.

The season initially ran from April 1989 until March 1990 in Japan on Fuji Television. The season was then licensed for a heavily edited dubbed broadcast by Funimation Entertainment. Their adaptation first ran from September 1996 through September 1997 in first-run syndication, primarily on affiliate stations of Fox, The WB and UPN (United Paramount Network). The 39 episodes were cut down to a mere 28. Their edited adaptation was syndicated to television by Saban Entertainment, and was released by Geneon Entertainment (then known as Pioneer) on VHS and DVD between 1997 and 1999. Eventually, Geneon Entertainment lost the distribution license to the first 67 episodes and Funimation began redubbing the series for an uncut broadcast. The unedited version was released on DVD in 2005, but later cancelled and Funimation eventually began releasing season box sets of Dragon Ball Z and they re-released their first season on February 6, 2007. In late 2013, the company released the first season box set on the Blu-ray Disc format. In June 2009, Funimation announced that they would be releasing Dragon Ball Z in a new seven volume set called the "Dragon Box". Based on the original series masters with frame-by-frame restoration, the first set was released November 10, 2009.

Two pieces of theme music were used throughout the season. The opening theme, "Cha-La Head-Cha-La", is performed by Hironobu Kageyama and the ending theme, "Detekoi Tobikiri Zenkai Power!" (でてこいとびきりZENKAIパワー！, Detekoi Tobikiri Zenkai Pawā!; "Come out, incredible full-force power!") is performed by Manna. The theme for the original 1996–1997 English dub is "Rock the Dragon", performed by Jeremy Sweet. The uncut English redub from 2005 uses "Dragon Ball Z theme" by Dave Moran. The remastered season one boxset uses "Dragon Ball Z movie theme" by Mark Menza.

== Development and release ==
The series serves as a sequel to the prior Dragon Ball anime and manga, which primarily focused on Goku's childhood experiences. It has been speculated that creator Akira Toriyama did not originally intend for the series to stretch past the Saiyan Saga when he began working on the Dragon Ball Z portion of the manga. In an interview from around the time of the last Dragon Ball arc, Toriyama said that the series would only continue for a "little while longer". Shunsuke Kikuchi, the composer for the Dragon Ball anime, continue to compose the score for Dragon Ball Z. Goku's Japanese voice actress Masako Nozawa also continued to voice the character in adulthood, unlike in many foreign dubs, which often use female actresses for Goku as a child before switching to male actors when the character becomes a teen during the final arc of Dragon Ball.

=== English dub ===
The first English dub of the episodes was produced by Filipino company Creative Products Corporation, airing on RPN 9 in the Philippines during 1993. In 1996, Dallas-based company Funimation began working on their first season of a North American dub for Dragon Ball Z. By this point, parts of Dragon Ball Z had already been dubbed for non-English audiences, in regions such as Latin America and Europe. Funimation company had previously produced an English dub of Dragon Ball's first 13 episodes and first movie, which aired in first-run syndication during 1995. Plans for a second syndicated Dragon Ball dub season were cancelled due to lower than expected ratings, and Funimation partnered with Los Angeles-based Saban Entertainment (known at the time for shows such as Mighty Morphin Power Rangers and X-Men: The Animated Series) to syndicate their Dragon Ball Z adaptation to television stations, including on Fox, UPN and WB affiliate stations. While Saban had a history of acquiring the rights to various anime series to be dubbed, Funimation still controlled the American license to the property during this period. When this dub was running in syndication, both the Funimation logo and the Saban logo appeared in the closing credits, with the Saban logo coming immediately after the Funimation logo. Like with the prior Dragon Ball dub from 1995, a group of Canadian voice actors from Vancouver, British Columbia were used. However, this time voice work was done at Ocean Studios, rather than at Dick & Rogers Sound like with the prior Dragon Ball dub. This has led to some fans referring to this dub as "the Ocean dub". Funimation producer Barry Watson would regularly fly out from Dallas to Vancouver to coordinate the voice actors at Ocean.

This dub aired during early morning time slots in most U.S. markets. It was part of the "Saban Network for Kids", a 1996–97 syndicated programming block which included other Saban anime dubs, such as Eagle Riders and Samurai Pizza Cats, as well as Masked Rider, Saban's Adventures of Oliver Twist and The Why Why Family. When Dragon Ball Z aired on this block, it had live action introductions and commercial break bumpers with children on bungee jumping ropes. These live action segments were also used on the other shows from the "Saban Network for Kids", and some of them had Power Rangers actor Greg Bullock, who played Lt. Stone on that series. The first season was a success, which led to Funimation creating a second dub season, that aired in syndication between late 1997 and mid-1998. When the first season was still airing in early 1997, Saban announced they would be airing the upcoming second season in its own two episode hour-long block, due to the first season's strong ratings. For the second season, non-live action bumpers replaced the live action ones from the first season.

This dub edited down the first season to 26 episodes in order to make it fit within a standard American television season. Due to broadcasting regulations of the time, Saban forced Funimation to remove all references to death, often replacing it with a euphemism for death known as "the Next Dimension", and digital paint was utilized to alter content that was deemed unacceptable, such as blood. The word "Hell" was also digitally removed from two characters shirts in the eighth dub episode, and edited to say "HFIL", which in the dub stood for "Home for Infinite Losers." The tenth dub episode "Escape from Piccolo" never aired in syndication, due to concerns from Saban over its content. It was first released via Pioneer Entertainment's VHS release of the dub in late 1997. Regarding this episode and Saban's censoring of the dub, Funimation president Gen Fukunaga remarked in a 1999 interview, "we had a lot of arguments with them, saying they were going way too far with the censorship, but they would refuse to air it unless it was cut to their liking. In fact, I recall one show that we censored a little less than usual, and they just refused to air it. That was the only actual episode that didn't make it to the airwaves, but there were a lot of other instances in which we felt they crossed the line."

According to Fukunaga, Saban initially wanted Funimation to cut out a scene in episode 17 where Nappa blows up a helicopter with journalists in it. They only allowed the scene to be kept after Funimation wrote a line where Tien says "I can see their parachutes, they're okay", immediately after the helicopter explodes and the journalists are killed. In other scenes, lines were added which implied that buildings destroyed by Vegeta and Nappa were empty or evacuated. Vegeta actor Brian Drummond's reading of the line "It's Over 9000!" in the episode "The Return of Goku" later became a popular internet meme in 2006, nine years after the scene originally aired on American television. This line was a mistranslation in a scene where Vegeta reacts to Goku's power level, and did not appear in the Japanese version, with the original line being "It's Over 8000!"

Funimation decided to replace the original Japanese score by Shunsuke Kikuchi so they wouldn't have to pay him music royalties, and outsourced the role of music to Saban Entertainment. Saban in turn hired their former in-house composer Ron Wasserman, who went uncredited so Saban's executives could collect the music royalties. In an uncredited capacity, Wasserman had also previously composed the music and theme songs for shows such as Mighty Morphin Power Rangers and X-Men: The Animated Series, and had already left the company in September 1995 since he was being overworked and was refused a pay rise. Saban let Wasserman compose for Dragon Ball Z from his home in Los Angeles, and he was allowed more creative freedom, giving it a darker sound than previous shows he had worked on. He later claimed that Saban didn't care about the show, and that the only instructions they gave him was to make sure that it had continuous background music playing, so they could earn maximum music royalties. He said "I got to do whatever I wanted, so I went with this really heavy, weird stuff", remembering that he would never receive any creative notes after sending the music to Saban. Since Wasserman was no longer employed by Saban at this point, they paid him on an episode by episode basis to score Dragon Ball Z, instead of giving him an annual salary like when he was still part of the company.

The theme song "Main Title" (known by fans as "Rock the Dragon") was created by Saban before they hired Wasserman to do background music for the show, with the vocals performed by Jeremy Sweet. Sweet had also done music for Power Rangers Zeo (1996), which was the first Power Rangers season to have been made after Wasserman left Saban in late 1995. "Rock the Dragon" and Wasserman's background music for the first season were included on an album titled Dragon Ball Z: Original USA Television Soundtrack, which was released on December 9, 1997. On this album and the credits of the dub, the music is credited to Saban founders Shuki Levy and Kussa Mahehi (an alias for Haim Saban), instead of Wasserman and Sweet, who are only listed as "music producers" in the credits of the dub; the actual extent of Levy or Saban's involvement remains unknown. This soundtrack would continue to be used for the second season of the syndicated dub, before being replaced in 1999 by Dallas-based composer Bruce Faulconer and his team of musicians in the third season. The third season was the first to use a new Dallas cast instead of the Ocean cast, the first produced without Saban Entertainment's involvement, and the first to air on Cartoon Network's Toonami block instead of syndication. Saban stopped collaborating with Funimation since they were leaving the syndication business in order to focus on producing content for their newly acquired cable network the Fox Family Channel. Wasserman has stated that he was interested in composing for Dragon Ball Z's third season, but was under the impression that Saban had lost the rights to another company for that season, since he wasn't even aware of who Funimation was while working on the first two seasons. He eventually found out that Funimation were the company doing the third season, and reached out to them, but they told him they were changing the sound. Fukunaga said in 1999 that "we had to change the 'composer'. We were not very pleased with the music for the first two seasons. We're much happier with this new composer, we just feel that the newer music is much better." He added, "we wanted to have more control over the music. Previously, we had almost no control. Saban wouldn't deliver the music on time, and we couldn't have it adjusted the way we wanted. Now, with it being done locally, we've been given a lot more control."

==== English re-dub ====
In 2004–2005, Funimation redubbed the first two syndicated seasons, with their American voice actors from Dallas, who had been used by the company from the third season onward. Unlike the 1996–1997 Ocean/Saban co-production, this dub had no episodes or scenes cut out and no visual censorship. While the script was still based on the script of the syndicated dub, they did slightly rewrite it to remove inaccurate lines and instances of censorship. Examples include the removal of the line "I can see their parachutes, they're okay", removing a line where Vegeta incorrectly claims that Goku's father was a "brilliant scientist", and removing another where Goku incorrectly states that it was Vegeta in his ape form who killed his Grandfather Gohan. The "It's Over 9000!" line was not rewritten, and it had not yet become an internet meme when the re-dub was being made. It featured a new background score by Dallas-based composer Nathan M. Johnson, who subsequently became a Texas state senator in 2018. When Funimation hired Johnson, he was working as a lawyer, and had no experience in composing for films and television. He later noted in 2012 that his music received a mixed response from fans, many of whom wanted Faulconer to re-do the first two seasons instead of him. Initial home video releases of the re-dub in 2005 were titled the "Ultimate Uncut Edition" and included a small number of episodes per DVD. These DVDs only used the Nathan M. Johnson score, as well as a new heavy metal theme song by Dave Moran, which replaced "Rock the Dragon". Funimation's 2007 season set release of the first season included an alternate audio track which combined the Dallas voices with the original Japanese score, and it also replaced Dave Moran's theme with a different theme from Mark Menza. This uncut version has since become the standard dub that Funimation has used on streaming services and subsequent Blu-ray releases. However, they did eventually re-release the syndicated dub of the first two seasons in 2013, as part of their "Rock the Dragon Edition" DVD set. In 2017, the rights to both the syndicated dub and the uncut redub were transferred to Sony, following their purchase of Funimation.

==== TV airings ====
In January 1997, U.S. cable network the International Channel began broadcasting Dragon Ball Z in the original Japanese. Beginning in August 1997, the syndicated English dub was aired on Canadian cable channel YTV. In 2000, the syndicated dub of these episodes began airing outside of North America, being shown on Network 10's Cheez TV block in Australia, New Zealand's TV3 and on the British version of Toonami. During the early 2000s, the syndicated dub also aired on SABC 2 in South Africa, with subtitled versions of the dub appearing in the Netherlands and Finland as well. The uncut Funimation re-dub is only known to have aired in 2005 on the American Toonami, which had previously aired reruns of the syndicated dub prior to the creation of the uncut re-dub. The Toonami reruns of the syndicated first season cut out Saban's logo from the credits, in addition to cutting out the live action segments which originated from the "Saban Network for Kids" block. The live action segments were also not used by any of the non-North American broadcasters, such as Cheez TV/Network 10, TV3 and Toonami UK.

To celebrate YTV's 20th anniversary in 2008, they had a one-off airing of the syndicated first episode "The Arrival of Raditz". This was the last time YTV ever aired Dragon Ball Z, and this airing kept the live action segments from the original American syndication broadcast. In mid-2010, Cheez TV's successor Toasted TV (another morning cartoon block on Network 10) began airing the first season of Dragon Ball Z, using the syndicated dub rather than the uncut Funimation redub, presumably since the uncut version wasn't acceptable to air in that timeslot. This was also the last time Network 10 ever aired Dragon Ball Z. The 2010 airing came six years after they had last aired Dragon Ball Z as part of Cheez TV in 2004.

==== Stations (1996–1997) ====
The following stations aired the first season of Dragon Ball Z''s syndicated dub in 1996 and 1997.

DAYS	TIME (AM)	STATION	MARKET
SUN	8:30	WB 11 (WPIX)	New York City – Brooklyn, NY
SAT	7:00	IND 9 (KCAL)	Los Angeles – Anaheim – Corona, CA
SAT	7:30	UPN 50 (WPWR)	Chicago, IL – Gary, IN
SUN	9:30	WB 17 (WPHL)	Philadelphia, PA
SUN	10:00	WB 20 (KOFY)	San Francisco – Oakland – San Jose, CA
SUN	9:30	WB 56 (WLVI)	Boston, MA – Manchester, NH
SUN	9:30	UPN 21 (KTXA)	Dallas – Fort Worth, TX
SAT	8:00	UPN 20 (WDCA)	Washington, DC – Hagerstown, MD
SAT	9:00	UPN 69 (WUPA)	Atlanta, GA
SUN	11:00	WB 20 (WXON)	Detroit, MI – Windsor, ON, Canada
SAT	7:00	WB 39 (KHTV)	Houston, TX
SUN	10:00	WB 22 (KTZZ)	Seattle – Tacoma – Olympia, WA
SAT	6:30	UPN 9 (KMSP)	Minneapolis – St. Paul – Bemidji, MN
SAT	7:30	IND 38 (WTTA)	Tampa – St. Petersburg – Sarasota – Lakeland, FL
SAT	7:00	WB 39 (WDZL)	Miami – Ft. Lauderdale – Key West, FL
SAT	11:00	UPN 45 (KUTP)	Phoenix, AZ
SUN	7:30	IND 55 (WBNX)	Cleveland – Akron – Canton – Lorain, OH
SUN	7:30	FOX 21/31 (KDVR/KFCT)	Denver – Fort Collins, CO
SUN	8:00	UPN 58 (KQCA)	Sacramento – Stockton – Modesto, CA
SUN	7:30	WB 18 (WKCF)	Orlando – Daytona Beach – Myrna Beach, FL
SAT	6:00	UPN 22 (WPTT)	Pittsburgh – Jeannette, PA
FRI	6:00	FOX 49 (KPDX)	Portland – Salem, OR
SAT	8:00	UPN 54 (WNUV)	Baltimore, MD
SAT	6:30	FOX 59 (WXIN)	Indianapolis – Kokomo, IN
FRI	6:00	WB 69 (KSWB)	San Diego, CA – Tijuana, BCA, Mexico
SUN	11:00	WB 55 (WFVT)	Charlotte – Belmont, NC – Rock Hill, SC
SUN	6:30	FOX 61 (WTIC)	Hartford – New Haven, CT
SAT	7:30	FOX 22 (WLFL)	Raleigh – Durham – Chapel Hill, NC
SAT	5:30	FOX 28 (WTTE)	Columbus, OH
SAT	6:30	FOX 64 (WNAC)	Providence, RI
SAT	7:30	UPN 35 (KRRT)	San Antonio – Kerrville, TX
SUN	6:00	FOX 54 (WZDX)	Huntsville – Decatur – Florence, AL
SAT	7:30	FOX 51 (WPXT)	Portland, ME
SAT	7:30	FOX 31 (WUHF)	Rochester, NY

== Episodes ==
No.	Initial dub no.	Translated title/Original North American dub title[North American re-dub title] Original Japanese	Directed by	Written by	Animation directed by	Original release date	English air date
1	1	"Mini-Goku is an Overprotected Boy! I Am Gohan." / "The Arrival of Raditz" [The New Threat] Transliteration: "Mini Gokū wa Obotchama! Boku Gohan Desu." (Japanese: ミニ悟空はおぼっちゃま！ボク悟飯です。)	Daisuke Nishio	Takao Koyama	Masayuki Uchiyama	April 26, 1989	September 13, 1996 June 14, 2005 (re-dub)
Five years have passed since Goku, a boy born with a tail and incredible strength, who would transform into a rampaging Great Ape the size of a building under the full moon, achieved his life-long goal of winning the 23rd World Martial Arts Tournament. An adult now, with his tail having been removed to prevent his transformation, Goku has settled down with his wife Chi-Chi, Goku and Chi-Chi's son Gohan is wandering around the woods outside of his house when a tiger steals his hat. While he's looking for the tiger, he accidentally falls into a river. Goku, searching for his son in his Flying Nibus, finds his hat. He suddenly sees Gohan floating down a river, but he can't reach him in time before he goes over a waterfall. Goku looks up and sees Gohan clinging to a branch, having somehow jumped out of the river. With Gohan safe, they head to Master Roshi's house. Meanwhile, a mysterious alien has arrived on Earth looking for a man named Kakarot. With a special device called a Scouter that he wears on his head, he searches for the strongest fighter on Earth. He finds Piccolo Jr., an incredibly powerful demon bent on world conquest, Demon King Piccolo's son and reeincernation and Goku's oldest and fiercest rival. But even Piccolo's attack are completely ineffective against this new threat. The alien is about to devastate Piccolo when he finds an even higher power level and flies off.
2	1	"The Mightiest Warrior in All of History is Goku's Older Brother!" / "The Arrival of Raditz" [Reunions] Transliteration: "Shijō Saikyō no Senshi wa Gokū no Ani Datta!" (Japanese: 史上最強の戦士は悟空の兄だった！)	Osamu Kasai	Katsuyuki Sumisawa & Takao Koyama	Katsumi Aoshima	May 3, 1989	September 13, 1996; June 15, 2005 (re-dub)
Goku and Gohan arrive at Goku's old sensei Master Roshi's island to meet Goku's old friends Bulma, Krillin, Master Roshi, and Master Roshi's Turtle. The others quickly notice the difference between Gohan's behavior and that of Goku as a child. Goku informs his friends that his wife Chi-Chi refuses to allow Gohan to fight, preferring that he instead he study constantly. The same mysterious alien arrives at the island and reveals himself: he is a Saiyan warrior named Raditz, part of a war-like race that wipes out the population of entire planets to sell the now uninhabited world to the highest bidder and he is Goku's older brother, meaning Goku is actually a Saiyan, explaining his unnatural strength and the tail he once had. Raditz also reveals that Goku's birth name is Kakarot. Goku learns that he was sent to destroy all life on Earth, but his memory loss from a terrible fall as a child prevented this outcome. Goku, Raditz, and the latter's two superiors are now the only Saiyans left alive after their planet was destroyed. Now Raditz has come to Earth to have Goku join him and the other two remaining Saiyans in conquering Earth, and he won't accept a refusal.
3	2	"All Right! This is the Strongest Combo in the World!" / "The World's Strongest Team" [Unlikely Alliance] Transliteration: "Yatta! Kore ga Chijō Saikyō no Konbi Da!" (Japanese: やった！これが地上最強のコンビだ！)	Kazuhisa Takenouchi	Katsuyuki Sumisawa	Mitsuo Shindō	May 10, 1989	September 20, 1996; June 16, 2005 (re-dub)
In order to get Goku to join him, Raditz kidnaps Gohan and orders Goku to kill 100 Earthlings before the next day as proof that he really has joined the Saiyans. Goku tries to stop him, but not even he can stop his brother's power. Even though he's no match for him, Goku will do whatever it takes to save his son. Krillin and Roshi volunteer to join Goku and save Gohan, however Goku refuses. They both had died during the events of Dragon Ball, and while the Dragon Balls may grant resurrection, they can only do so ONCE. Suddenly, Piccolo appears and proposes that he and Goku temporarily team up in order to stop Raditz. He had seen Raditz's power while the Saiyan was looking for Goku, and he knows that neither of them are a match for this alien on their own, despite being a villain, Piccolo is wise enough to realise that even he cannot rule over a world slaughtered by the Saiyans. Raditz returns to the location of his landing pod, leaving Gohan imprisoned in it. His Scouter detects a large power level coming from Gohan, but ignores it thinking that it's malfunctioning. Using the Dragon Radar to find Gohan (who has one of the Dragon Balls on his hat) and Raditz, Goku and Piccolo arrive and remove their training weights, Raditz notes with some surprise that his Scouter has read an increase in their power, and now realises they had been fighting him before while handicapped.
4	3	"Piccolo's Trump Card! Gohan, the Crybaby-kun" / "Gohan's Hidden Powers" [Piccolo's Plan] Transliteration: "Pikkoro no Kirifuda! Gohan wa Nakimushikun" (Japanese: ピッコロの切り札！悟飯は泣きむしクン)	Yoshihiro Ueda	Toshiki Inoue	Tomekichi Takeuchi	May 17, 1989	September 27, 1996; June 20, 2005 (re-dub)
Goku and Piccolo throw everything they've got against Raditz, but it seems that even with the weights removed, it seems their combined power stops short of Raditz's own strength. Both get injured and Piccolo even loses an arm. However, Piccolo has an idea that might beat him: the Makankosappo (Named "Special Beam Cannon" in the first english dub), his newest and most powerful technique that he was planning on using against Goku. But, he has to power up to make it work, and he requires five minutes to gather the strength, so Goku does his best to give him that. Despite the fact that the two drastically raise their power levels with heavy concentration, they do not manage to defeat Raditz using their attacks. Suddenly, Goku does manage to grab Raditz's tail, remembering that whenever someone grabbed his own tail, it effectively paralysed him. Raditz, now suffering from the same debilitating state, feigns surrender and Goku releases his tail, despite Piccolo's warning. However, Raditz quickly attacks Goku again elbowing him in the face and crushing his chest. As Raditz prepares to kill Goku, he suddenly picks up an enormous power level: it's Gohan who jumps out of the spaceship.
5	4	"Goku Dies! There's Only One Last Chance" / "Goku's Unusual Journey" [Gohan's Rage] Transliteration: "Gokū Shisu! Rasuto Chansu wa Ichido dake" (Japanese: 悟空死す！ラストチャンスは一度だけ)	Kazuhisa Takenouchi	Takao Koyama	Masayuki Uchiyama	May 24, 1989	October 4, 1996; June 21, 2005 (re-dub)
As Raditz tortures Goku, Gohan bursts out of Raditz's spaceship and hurls himself into Raditz with incredible power that stuns and injures the Saiyan. However, Gohan's power disappears as quickly as it surfaced, leaving him defenseless against his father's attacker who quickly hits Gohan, knocking him out. Raditz intends to kill Gohan, who he views as the only person capable of defeating him. In a last-ditch effort to save his son, Goku grabs Raditz in a hold that leaves both of them open to Piccolo's Special Beam Cannon. Goku urges Piccolo to use it, even if it costs his own life. Piccolo then starts to wonder whether or not he should use it. Despite Raditz's pleas for mercy, Piccolo lets loose his attack, which hits both Goku and Raditz, killing the latter. Thinking they've already won, Piccolo tells Raditz (who's slowly dying) about the Dragon Balls, and that they have the power to grant almost any wish. So Goku will not be dead for long. Once he's heard everything, Raditz tells Piccolo that his Scouter is also a transmitter and that in one year's time, two more Saiyans, more powerful than Raditz, will arrive on Earth to destroy everyone. Goku lives to see Bulma, Roshi and Krillin arrive and hear that the unconscious Gohan is alive, but thereafter dies, leaving his body to be taken by Kami. Far away on another planet, Nappa and the Saiyan Prince Vegeta, Raditz's superiors, having heard everything through Raditz's Scouter, plan to visit Earth and wish for immortality using the Dragon Balls.
6	4	"Even Yama-sama is Surprised – The Fight Continues in the Next World" / "Goku's Unusual Journey" [No Time Like the Present] Transliteration: "Enmasama mo Bikkuri – Ano Yo de Faito" (Japanese: エンマ様もビックリあの世でファイト)	Mitsuo Hashimoto	Keiji Terui	Yukio Ebisawa	June 7, 1989	October 4, 1996; June 22, 2005 (re-dub)
To prepare for this threat, Kami, the guardian of Earth, takes Goku to a special place in the afterlife (or "Other World") for training with the legendary martial arts master of the afterlife, King Kai. But in order to get to King Kai, he must first cross a treacherous path called Snake Way. Only one person has ever successfully crossed it, King Yemma, who judges the souls of the dead. King Yemma tells Goku not to fall off Snake Way or he will never return. Goku starts the long journey by flying over the path, until eventually he runs out of energy and must continue on foot. Back on Planet Earth, Piccolo regenerates his arm and decides to take Gohan (who's still unconscious) under his wing and train him, with the hope of tapping into his hidden power. Piccolo awakens the boy and forces him to train using fear. Bulma studies the circuitry of Raditz's Scouter, and agrees with Master Roshi that Krillin should be the one to tell Chi-Chi the recent news of Goku and Gohan.
7	5	"Survival with Dinosaurs! Gohan's Harsh Training" / "Gohan's Metamorphosis" [Day 1] Transliteration: "Kyōryū to Sabaibaru! Gohan no Tsurai Shugyō" (Japanese: 恐竜とサバイバル！悟飯のツライ修行)	Minoru Okazaki	Keiji Terui	Minoru Maeda	June 14, 1989	October 11, 1996; June 23, 2005 (re-dub)
Piccolo leaves Gohan alone in the wilderness for six months so he can learn to take care of himself, just like his father did as a child. Even though there are dangerous animals in the wild, Gohan's hidden powers help him escape, but also get him stuck on a really tall boulder, from which he can't get down. High above, Kami tells Mr. Popo that in a years time, both he and Piccolo will die from unknown causes and that if Piccolo knew this it might have been what caused his slow change of heart towards Gohan. Meanwhile, Krillin tries to break the news about Goku and Gohan to Chi-Chi, but is too scared.
8	5	"A Great Transformation on a Moonlit Night! The Secret of Gohan's Power" / "Gohan's Metamorphosis" [Gohan Goes Bananas!] Transliteration: "Tsuki no Kagayaku Yoru ni Daihenshin! Gohan Pawā no Himitsu" (Japanese: 月の輝く夜に大変身！悟飯パワーの秘密)	Yoshihiro Ueda	Takao Koyama	Masayuki Uchiyama	June 21, 1989	October 11, 1996; June 27, 2005 (re-dub)
As Krillin and the others try to find the Dragon Balls after Bulma adjusts the eyepiece for their use, Chi-Chi arrives with her father Ox-King to search for Goku and Gohan, and Master Roshi is forced to tell Chi-Chi the truth himself about Raditz's attack, Goku's sacrifice and Gohan's taken by Piccolo, upon which she faints. Yajirobe appears with a task for Krillin: he must bring Yamcha, Tien, and Chiaotzu to Korin Tower in preparation for the Saiyans' arrival. Before he leaves he also tells them that Baba is coming to tell them that Goku wishes to be brought back just before the Saiyans' arrival. That night, back at the wilderness, Gohan sees the full moon for the first time and goes through the same transformation as his father once did, becoming a giant ape-like creature, known as a Great Ape. Gohan then proceeds to destroy the surrounding area, unable to control his new monstrous form and power. Piccolo, who had been watching Gohan, destroys the moon to stop the rampaging Great Ape Gohan. Gohan reverts to his normal, naked form, and with no moon, the chance of the incoming Saiyans to transform is gone. Just to be safe, Piccolo pulls Gohan's tail off before giving him new clothes with Piccolo's own symbol on it and a sword. Finally, Piccolo again leaves Gohan by himself.
9	6	"Sorry, Robot-san – The Desert of Vanishing Tears" / "Gohan Makes a Friend" [The Strangest Robot] Transliteration: "Gomen ne Robottosan Sabaku ni Kieta Namida." (Japanese: ゴメンねロボットさん砂漠に消えた涙。)	Osamu Kasai	Katsuyuki Sumisawa	Katsumi Aoshima	June 28, 1989	October 18, 1996; June 28, 2005 (re-dub)
After waking up from his transformation, Gohan finds his tail gone and a new set of clothes that resemble his father's gi. But he has no time to figure out what happened, as hungry animals descend upon him. Gohan escapes, but falls into a cave where he finds an ancient Capsule Corp. robot that's been trapped for over thirty years, and it's not too pleased about having company. Wanting to escape the cave, he asks the robot for help, but it's not interested. However, the robot lets out his soft side and helps Gohan get some mushrooms to eat. Later when Gohan tries to help the robot escape, the cave starts collapsing and the robot helps him, throwing him to safety.
10	6	"Don't Cry, Gohan! His First Fight" / "Gohan Makes a Friend" [A New Friend] Transliteration: "Naku na Gohan! Hajimete no Tatakai." (Japanese: 泣くな悟飯！はじめての闘い)	Kazuhisa Takenouchi	Keiji Terui	Mitsuo Shindō	July 5, 1989	October 18, 1996; June 29, 2005 (re-dub)
Krillin and Bulma find Yamcha and Puar. Krillin tells Yamcha of the important news, and they start heading to Korin Tower on the Capsule Corp. ship with the others. As Gohan becomes more like his father in bravery, power, and benevolence, he finds a wounded dinosaur, and aids it in recovering. He then tries to defend it from a hungry predator.
11	7	"The Saiyans, Mightiest Warriors in the Universe, Awaken!" / "Trouble on Arlia" [Terror on Arlia] Transliteration: "Uchūichi no Kyōsenshi Saiyajin Mezameru!" (Japanese: 宇宙一の強戦士サイヤ人めざめる！)	Yoshihiro Ueda	Toshiki Inoue	Tomekichi Takeuchi	July 12, 1989	October 25, 1996; June 30, 2005 (re-dub)
Goku continues his seemingly endless journey on Snake Way. Deep in space, the Saiyan warriors, Vegeta and Nappa, make a stop on a planet called Arlia and "become prisoners" to their tyrant king. When they are called before the king, they break their bonds and kill the guards. The king summons his giant monster on them, but they easily take care of them both. The other Arlians are grateful of the Saiyans for killing their tyrant king. They proclaim that Vegeta and Nappa will always receive a hero's welcome on Arlia. However, Despite all of this, Vegeta destroys the entire planet.
12	8	"Catnap on the Serpentine Road Goku Takes a Tumble" / "Home For Infinite Losers" [Global Training] Transliteration: "Hebi no Michi de Inemuri Gokū ga Okkochiru" (Japanese: 蛇の道でいねむり悟空が落っこちる)	Daisuke Nishio	Takao Koyama	Masayuki Uchiyama	July 19, 1989	November 1, 1996; July 4, 2005 (re-dub)
Gohan trains hard in the wilderness, while Piccolo trains himself. Meanwhile, Krillin and Bulma are still trying to find Tien and Chiaotzu so they can begin training with Kami. Unfortunately for Tien and Chiaotzu, Launch isn't very willing to part with her company.
13	8	"Hands Off! Enma-sama's Secret Fruit" / "Home For Infinite Losers" [Goz and Mez] Transliteration: "Te o Dasu na! Enmasama no Himitsu no Kudamono" (Japanese: 手を出すな！エンマ様の秘密の果実)	Mitsuo Hashimoto	Katsuyuki Sumisawa	Yukio Ebisawa	July 26, 1989	November 1, 1996; July 5, 2005 (re-dub)
Goku accidentally falls from Snake Way into Hell, where he finds a fruit tree. Goku is famished, so he tries to take a piece. However, the tree belongs to King Yemma, and the two oni there, Goz and Mez, will do anything it takes to stop Goku from acquiring the fruit. They explain that it is a special fruit that will keep whoever eats it full for a long time. Goz and Mez have their own tests to give. The first isn't very successful (even though he won), but the second was. To their great surprise, Goku wins the race. Frustrated, they direct Goku to a "shortcut" back to Snake Way. Goku reveals that he has stolen a piece of fruit from the tree. Unfortunately, this leads back to King Yemma, and Goku must start all over. However, after eating the fruit he is now much faster and will not get as tired.
14	9	"Such Sweet Temptation! The Snake Princess-sama's Hospitality" / "Princess Snake's Hospitality" [Princess Snake] Transliteration: "Ama〜i Yūwaku! Hebihimesama no Omotenashi" (Japanese: あま～い誘惑！蛇姫さまのおもてなし)	Minoru Okazaki	Hiroshi Toda	Minoru Maeda	August 2, 1989	November 8, 1996; July 6, 2005 (re-dub)
Even though Goku has to start all over on Snake Way, he quickly catches up to where he was last thanks to King Yemma's fruit. He sees a castle in up ahead, and assumes it must belong to King Kai. He enters the castle, only to find out that it belongs to Princess Snake. The Princess finds Goku very attractive, so she does everything she can to keep him there. Goku tries several times to leave, but finally, she is forced to show her true form. In her new, horrible form, she captures Goku, but he is able to break free and continue down Snake Way.
15	10	"Escape from Piccolo! Gohan Summons a Storm" / "Escape from Piccolo" [Dueling Piccolos] Transliteration: "Pikkoro kara no Dasshutsu! Arashi o Yobu Gohan" (Japanese: ピッコロからの脱出！嵐を呼ぶ悟飯)	Kazuhisa Takenouchi	Katsuyuki Sumisawa	Masayuki Uchiyama	August 9, 1989	October 28, 1997 (video premiere); September 11, 1998; July 7, 2005 (re-dub)
Piccolo splits himself in half, and the two forms fight each other. Piccolo uses this method to train by himself at a high intensity. Meanwhile, Gohan sleds down a sandy hill. After he crashes, he tries to find a way out of wherever he is to his mother (he thinks his home is close by). After coming to the same spot he originally was at first, he realizes, he must be on an island. Brainstorming, he builds a boat, so he can pay a quick visit to his mother, whom he misses. As he drifts on the sea at night, a huge storm begins heading Gohan's way, and he can't swim.
16	10	"Run, Gohan! Longing for Mount Paozu, Where Chichi is Waiting" / "Escape from Piccolo" [Plight of the Children] Transliteration: "Hashire Gohan! Chichi no Matsu Natsukashi no Paozu Yama" (Japanese: 走れ悟飯！チチの待つなつかしのパオズ山)	Mitsuo Hashimoto; Storyboarded by : Katsumi Aoshima	Keiji Terui	Katsumi Aoshima	August 16, 1989	October 28, 1997 (video premiere); September 11, 1998; July 11, 2005 (re-dub)
Gohan is able to survive the storm, and he washes up on the shore. There he finds a group of orphans living on their own. The adults in the area are trying to capture them and take them to an orphanage. After telling them his goal, Pigero, their leader, designs a plan to get Gohan home, and get all of the orphans to a safe location. The adults come, and Pigero and Gohan are able to defend themselves against the adults, but Pigero suddenly realizes something: the children will be better off at the orphanage. Knowing this, he lets the adults capture the other orphans. He takes Gohan to the woods near his house, and then drives off. Gohan gets within sight of his home, but decides not to go in, knowing how important it is that he train for the Saiyans. Piccolo, hovering above him, sees all of this, and takes Gohan back to begin his martial arts training.
17	11	"City of No Tomorrow! The Long Road to Victory" / "Showdown in the Past" [Pendulum Room Peril] Transliteration: "Asu Naki Machi! Shōri e no Tōi Michinori" (Japanese: 明日なき街！勝利への遠い道のり)	Osamu Kasai	Hiroshi Toda	Mitsuo Shindō	August 30, 1989	November 15, 1996; July 12, 2005 (re-dub)
Gohan's real training is about to begin, as Piccolo trains him in the martial arts. On Kami's Lookout, Yamcha, Tien, Krillin and Chiaotzu want to get the same training as Goku did. So, Mr. Popo takes them to the Pendulum Room where the past, present, and future intertwine. Krillin and the others use the room and are sent to Planet Vegeta in the past, facing two powerful Saiyan warriors. After a horrifying battle, the Z Fighters continue their training with more motivation.
18	12	"Last Stop on the Serpentine Road! Are You Kaio-sama?" / "The End of Snake Way" [The End of Snake Way] Transliteration: "Shūte〜n Hebi no Michi! Omē Kaiōsama ka?" (Japanese: 終点～ん蛇の道！おめえ界王様か？)	Yoshihiro Ueda	Katsuyuki Sumisawa	Masayuki Uchiyama	September 6, 1989	January 3, 1997; July 13, 2005 (re-dub)
After a rough day of training with Piccolo, Gohan rests for the next day. Gohan has a bad dream involving Raditz beating his father, and he suddenly wakes up. Gohan looks up at the moon which has mysteriously reappeared, and overcome by his nightmares of Goku's death, he loses control of himself and attacks Piccolo, who has arrived to see what's going on. Piccolo does his best to stop him, but once Gohan grows his tail back and changes into a Great Ape with another gaze at the moon, he is powerless to stop him. Piccolo tries to destroy the moon, but finds that it is a projection from Goku's old Saiyan spaceship. Piccolo destroys the ship, reversing the transformation and pulling Gohan's tail. Meanwhile, after a long trip, Goku finally makes it to King Kai's planet, and finds a friendly little monkey, whom he believes to be King Kai. While mimicking the monkey's movements under the belief his training started, Goku stops upon meeting a blue sentient-being.
19	13	"The Battle with Gravity! Catch Bubbles-kun" / "A Fight Against Gravity... Catch Bubbles!" [Defying Gravity] Transliteration: "Jūryoku to no Tatakai! Baburusukun o Tsukamaero" (Japanese: 重力との戦い！バブルス君をつかまえろ)	Kazuhisa Takenouchi	Hiroshi Toda	Tomekichi Takeuchi	September 13, 1989	January 10, 1997; July 14, 2005 (re-dub)
As Gohan's training gets harder every day, Goku officially meets King Kai. King Kai reveals the Saiyans will arrive on Earth in less than 6 months. His first task is to catch the monkey, whose name is Bubbles, but it's not going to be easy. The gravity on this tiny planet is 10 times that of Earth, making it hard for Goku to even stand up. Just when Goku is losing hope, he gets inspired after learning that his people withstand different fighting conditions and that Planet Vegeta's gravity is the same as King Kai's planet. After three weeks, Goku conquers the gravity and catches Bubbles.
20	14	"The Saiyan Legend Reborn! Goku's Roots" / "The Legend of the Saiyans" [Goku's Ancestors] Transliteration: "Yomigaeru Saiyajin Densetsu! Gokū no Rūtsu" (Japanese: よみがえるサイヤ人伝説！悟空のルーツ)	Mitsuo Hashimoto	Takao Koyama	Yukio Ebisawa	September 20, 1989	January 17, 1997; July 18, 2005 (re-dub)
Goku's next task in King Kai's training is to hit the grasshopper, Gregory, with a heavy mallet. After a long chase, it seems that Goku can't hit Gregory yet. While taking a break, King Kai tells Goku about the Saiyan people. They were a warrior race who shared Planet Vegeta with the smarter, though weaker, Tuffles. After a long war, the Saiyans overpowered and destroyed the Tuffles and stole their technology. The Saiyans became space pirates and began cleansing planets of civilizations and selling them. Eventually, the Saiyans' and Planet Vegeta were destroyed by a meteor shower, though only four Saiyans were able to survive; Goku/Kakarot, Raditz, Vegeta and Nappa. Willing to stop the Saiyans from destroying Earth, Goku continues his training and manages to hit Gregory. Now King Kai will train Goku himself in the ways of the Kaio-Ken.
21	15	"Come Forth, Shen Long! The Saiyans Finally Arrive on Earth" / "A Black Day for Planet Earth" [Counting Down] Transliteration: "Ide yo Shenron! Saiyajin Tsui ni Chikyū Tōchaku" (Japanese: いでよ神龍！サイヤ人ついに地球到着)	Minoru Okazaki	Keiji Terui	Minoru Maeda	September 27, 1989	January 24, 1997; July 19, 2005 (re-dub)
After days of hard training with King Kai, Goku has gotten much stronger and faster. But, the Saiyans are going to arrive the next day, so Goku speaks to Master Roshi telepathically through King Kai. He asks him to use the Dragon Balls to wish him back. Suddenly, King Kai realizes that he forgot to account for the time it will take Goku to go back down Snake Way. With no time to waste, Goku leaves King Kai's planet and races down Snake Way.
22	16	"Unbelievable! Saibaimen, Born of the Soil" / "The Battle Begins... Goku Where Are You?" [The Darkest Day] (Japanese: んなバカな！土から生まれたサイバイマン)	Kazuhisa Takenouchi	Takao Koyama	Masayuki Uchiyama	October 11, 1989	February 1, 1997; July 20, 2005 (re-dub)
After a year of space travel, the two Saiyans, Vegeta and Nappa, arrive on Earth. To celebrate their arrival, Nappa completely destroys East City with ease by creating an energy blast. Vegeta chastises Nappa, as he could have also destroyed the Dragon Balls. Sensing their power, the Z Fighters mobilize for an attack. The Saiyans search for any large power levels with their scouters, and they head toward Piccolo and Gohan. Just when Krillin shows up to help, the Saiyans also arrive. Piccolo learns that he is a Namekian because Vegeta recognizes the green skin that is typical of Namekians. Yajirobe knows the threat as well, but instead of stopping them, he poses as the leader of Earth's Special Forces to get free food.
23	17	"Yamucha Dies! The Terror of the Saibaimen" / "The Saibamen Strike" [Saibamen Attack!] Transliteration: "Yamucha Shisu! Osoru Beshi Saibaiman" (Japanese: ヤムチャ死す！おそるべしサイバイマン)	Yoshihiro Ueda	Takao Koyama	Katsumi Aoshima	October 18, 1989	February 8, 1997; July 21, 2005 (re-dub)
Just to have some fun, Vegeta and Nappa grow some weird creatures, called Saibamen, to test their opponents' strength. Suddenly, Tien, Chiaotzu, and Yamcha arrive to join the battle. Tien is the first to go up against one of the Saibamen. Thanks to his training, Tien easily beats one of them. Angry at his failure, Vegeta destroys the losing Saibaman. Yamcha is up against the next Saibaman, and it seems he, too, is stronger, but his opponent grabs Yamcha and self-destructs, killing them both.
24	18	"Farewell Ten-san! Chaozu's Suicide Strategy" / "Nappa... The Invincible?" [The Power of Nappa] Transliteration: "Sayonara Tensan! Chaozu no Sutemi no Senpō" (Japanese: さよなら天さん！餃子の捨て身の戦法)	Tatsuya Orime; Storyboarded by : Osamu Kasai	Katsuyuki Sumisawa	Mitsuo Shindō	October 25, 1989	February 15, 1997; July 25, 2005 (re-dub)
Yamcha has been killed by the Saibaman's surprise explosion. Back at the Kame House, everyone mourns his death, especially Bulma and Puar. Angered by losing him, Krillin fights the remaining Saibamen. He fires a powerful energy attack that completely destroys four of the remaining Saibamen, with Piccolo killing the last Saibamen. However, the real battle is about to begin, because the Saiyan Nappa steps up to fight, who proves to be much stronger than any of them. As Tien gets beaten up by Nappa and loses his right arm, Chiaotzu latches on to Nappa's back and explodes in a kamikaze attempt to destroy the Saiyan after a telepathic goodbye to Tien. Unfortunately, the maneuver has little effect on Nappa.
25	19	"Tenshinhan Cries Out!! This is My Final Kikoho" / "Tien Goes All Out!!" [Sacrifice] Transliteration: "Tenshinhan Zekkyō!! Kore ga Saigo no Kikōhō Da" (Japanese: 天津飯絶叫!!これが最後の気功砲だ)	Daisuke Nishio	Hiroshi Toda	Tomekichi Takeuchi	November 1, 1989	February 22, 1997; July 26, 2005 (re-dub)
Piccolo and Krillin do their best against Nappa, but the Saiyan is much too strong for them. Using all the power he has, Tien fires an attack to avenge his fallen friend, but it is still not enough to stop the rampaging Nappa. With the attack having no effect, Tien believes he has failed and dies.
26	19	"An Intense Three-Hour Delay! The Kinto Un Bullet-Express" / "Tien Goes All Out!!" [Nappa's Rampage] Transliteration: "Hitasura Matte Sanjikan! Dangan Hikō no Kintoun" (Japanese: ひたすら待って3時間！弾丸飛行の筋斗雲)	Yoshihiro Ueda; Storyboarded by : Kazuhisa Takenouchi	Takao Koyama	Masayuki Uchiyama	November 8, 1989	February 22, 1997; July 27, 2005 (re-dub)
With Tien dead, only Piccolo, Krillin, and Gohan remain to fight, and they begin to wonder when Goku will show up. They tell Vegeta that Goku is far more powerful than any of them, and the Saiyan Prince can't resist the thought of a better fight, as he has grown bored of the relatively weak Earthlings. He tells Nappa that they will wait three hours for Goku. Instead of standing around for three hours, Nappa flies around the world to have fun and destroying everything in his path to kill some time. Goku arrives on Earth, but he is far away from the battlefield. The three hours are up, so Vegeta tells Nappa to continue the fight.
27	20	"Leave it to Me! Gohan's Great Burst of Anger" / "Time's Up!" [Nimbus Speed] Transliteration: "Boku ni Makasete! Gohan – Ikari no Daibakuhatsu" (Japanese: ぼくにまかせて！悟飯・怒りの大爆発)	Mitsuo Hashimoto	Toshiki Inoue	Yukio Ebisawa	November 22, 1989	April 12, 1997; July 28, 2005 (re-dub)
As Goku heads toward the battlefield on his Nimbus cloud, Piccolo, Krillin, and Gohan devise a plan to stop Nappa: they plan to pull his tail, which will weaken him enough to take him out. As Piccolo grabs Nappa's tail, Gohan rushes to finish the fight. However, it seems that Nappa and Vegeta have evolved past their weaknesses, and they are no longer crippled when their tail is grabbed. With their plan a failure, Nappa begins to pound on Piccolo and Krillin. Only Gohan is left to fight, and the young Saiyan unleashes a powerful blast against Nappa. Enraged by Gohan's attack, Nappa fires a blast at Gohan that could finish him off. However, having grown fond of Gohan, Piccolo protects Gohan by taking the brunt of Nappa's attack.
28	21	"Ferocity of the Saiyans! Kami-sama and Piccolo Both Die" / "The Return of Goku" [Goku's Arrival] Transliteration: "Saiyajin no Mōi! Kamisama mo Pikkoro mo Shinda" (Japanese: サイヤ人の猛威！神様もピッコロも死んだ)	Minoru Okazaki	Hiroshi Toda	Minoru Maeda	November 29, 1989	April 19, 1997; August 1, 2005 (re-dub)
Piccolo makes the ultimate sacrifice, and dives in front of Gohan to block Nappa's attack. As Piccolo dies, he tells Gohan that he is his only friend and how sorry he is about being so hard on him during training. With Piccolo dead, Kami and the Dragon Balls are also gone, meaning that no one can be wished back. When all hope seems lost for Earth, Goku finally arrives. After giving Gohan and Krillin a Senzu bean, Goku learns what happened to his friends. Angered, Goku takes out his frustration on the hulking Nappa.
29	22	"Father is Awesome! Kaio-ken, the Ultimate Finishing Technique" / "Goku Strikes Back" [Lesson Number One] Transliteration: "Tōsan Sugē ya! Kyūkyoku no Hissatsuwaza – Kaiōken" (Japanese: 父さんすげぇや！究極の必殺技・界王拳)	Yoshihiro Ueda	Katsuyuki Sumisawa	Masayuki Uchiyama	December 6, 1989	April 26, 1997; August 2, 2005 (re-dub)
Goku is able to easily beat Nappa, thanks to King Kai's training. With a measured power level in the thousands, he is vastly superior to the Saiyan who so easily defeated his friends. Goku avenges all of his friends. Having seen enough of the fight, Vegeta orders Nappa to stop and let him fight Goku. To have some more fun, Nappa decides to attack Gohan and Krillin, only to be stopped by Goku's Kaio-ken attack. Unable to move, Nappa asks Vegeta for help, but the cruel prince does not tolerate weakness. Vegeta kills Nappa with a sadistic display of power.
30	23	"A Hot, Unbounded Battle! Goku vs. Vegeta" / "Goku vs. Vegeta... A Saiyan Duel!" [Goku vs. Vegeta] Transliteration: "Genkai o Koeta Atsui Tatakai! Gokū Tai Bejīta" (Japanese: 限界を超えた熱い戦い！悟空対ベジータ)	Tatsuya Orime	Keiji Terui	Katsumi Aoshima	December 13, 1989	May 3, 1997; August 3, 2005 (re-dub)
Goku instructs Krillin and Gohan to leave the battlefield, as he doesn't want them to get hurt. With no one in their way, Goku and Vegeta begin their fight for the fate of the Earth. Even with Goku using his Kaio-ken technique, Vegeta is still more powerful. Goku has no choice but to try a Kaio-ken x2, but even with this increase in power, he still can't overpower Vegeta. His only choice is to try a Kaio-ken x3, but the incredible surge in power could destroy his body.
31	23	"Now, Goku! A Final Technique with Everything on the Line" / "Goku vs. Vegeta... A Saiyan Duel!" [Saiyan Sized Secret] Transliteration: "Ima da Gokū! Subete o Kaketa Saigo no Ōwaza" (Japanese: いまだ悟空！すべてを賭けた最後の大技)	Daisuke Nishio	Toshiki Inoue	Tomekichi Takeuchi	December 20, 1989	May 3, 1997; August 4, 2005 (re-dub)
Thanks to the Kaio-ken x3 technique, Goku has the upper hand against Vegeta, which infuriates the Saiyan Prince. He decides that if he can't beat Goku, he will destroy the Earth, and flies high up in the air and fires his Galick Gun attack. Goku unleashes the Kamehameha wave, and the two energy blasts meet in midair. Goku and Vegeta pour all of their energy into this attack, and after a long struggle, Vegeta's blast is pushing Goku's back, even with Goku using the Kaio-ken x3 attack. With no choice left, Goku uses a Kaio-ken x4 attack, and with the extra power, he is able to blast Vegeta into space. However, Vegeta is able to recover, enraged that Goku's power is superior to his. Vegeta decides to become a Great Ape for his rematch with Goku. The Saiyan Prince starts searching for the full moon, but cannot find it, thanks to Piccolo having destroyed it before the Saiyans' arrival. Thinking Goku must have blown up the moon just to prevent him from transforming, Vegeta returns to Earth where Goku is completely spent and claims to have a trick up his sleeve. He tells Goku the origin of how Saiyans transform into Great Apes through Blutz Waves: the power of a planets moon creates the Blutz Waves, and he can create and launch his own artificial moon into the sky in the event a planet has no moon. Absorbing the Blutz Waves reflecting from the artificial moon, Vegeta begins to transform into a Great Ape as Goku looks on in much horror.
32	24	"Battle Power Times Ten!! Vegeta's Great Metamorphosis" / "Vegeta... Saiyan Style!" [Spirit Bomb Away!] Transliteration: "Sentōryoku Jūbai!! Bejīta Daihenshin" (Japanese: 戦闘力10倍!!ベジータ大変身)	Yoshihiro Ueda	Katsuyuki Sumisawa	Masayuki Uchiyama	January 17, 1990	May 10, 1997; August 8, 2005 (re-dub)
By creating an artificial moon with a specialized ball of energy completed with Blutz Waves, Vegeta transforms into a Great Ape. But unlike Goku and Gohan, Vegeta has complete control of himself while in this transformed state. Upon seeing Vegeta's Great Ape form, Goku remembers his childhood how see the full moon and transforms into Great Ape with rampage as a child, realizing he unintentionally killed his Grandpa Gohan. Luckily, Goku has one last attack that could finish Vegeta: the Spirit Bomb. As Gohan and Krillin return to the battlefield, Goku is able to create the bomb. Vegeta, however, is able to prevent Goku from using it. With no energy left, Goku is now at the mercy of Vegeta.
33	25	"Don't Die, Father!! This is the Depth of Gohan's Power" / "Stop Vegeta Now!" [Hero in the Shadows] Transliteration: "Shinanaide Tōsan!! Kore ga Gohan no Sokojikara" (Japanese: 死なないで父さん!!これが悟飯の底力)	Mitsuo Hashimoto	Keiji Terui	Yukio Ebisawa	January 24, 1990	May 17, 1997; August 9, 2005 (re-dub)
Gohan and Krillin arrive at the battlefield, but have to be quick to save Goku, who is being pounded mercilessly by Great Ape Vegeta. Krillin devises a plan to stop Vegeta: cut off the Saiyan Prince's tail. As Krillin prepares to fire the Destructo Disk Gohan distracts Vegeta, but the Saiyan Prince is too smart for their tricks, and foils their plot. Suddenly, Yajirobe appears out of nowhere and cuts Vegeta's tail off, causing him to revert to his normal form. Unfortunately, he still proves too powerful to be stopped by the remaining Z Fighters.
34	25	"Shoot, Kuririn! The Genki Dama, Packed with Hope" / "Stop Vegeta Now!" [Krillin's Offensive] Transliteration: "Ute Kuririn! Negai o Kometa Genkidama" (Japanese: 撃てクリリン！願いをこめた元気玉)	Minoru Okazaki	Takao Koyama	Minoru Maeda	January 31, 1990	May 17, 1997; August 10, 2005 (re-dub)
As Gohan fights against Vegeta, Goku gives Krillin the part of the Spirit Bomb that he was able to save. As Krillin prepares to unleash the ball, King Kai telepathically contacts him to instruct him not to use his eyes to throw it, but to feel it out. Sensing the right moment, Krillin fires the bomb, but Vegeta is able to dodge it. Goku telepathically communicates with Gohan, telling his son to redirect the blast at Vegeta, who has jumped into the air. As the Spirtit Bomb won't harm anyone with a pure heart, Gohan is able to aim it directly at Vegeta, and lands a direct hit. However, Vegeta falls back down to Earth, and recovers from the blast. He blows away the Z Fighters with a giant explosion of energy, but finds that they have withstood the blast, separated from each other. Vegeta is about to destroy them one by one starting with Gohan, when he notices that Gohan's tail has grown back. Vegeta realizes in horror the artificial moon he created is still active, meaning Gohan can transform into a Great Ape if he sees the artificial moon.
35	26	"Cause a Miracle! Son Gohan, the Super Saiyan" / "The Battle Ends" [Mercy] Transliteration: "Kiseki o Okose! Sūpā Saiyajin Son Gohan" (Japanese: 奇跡を起こせ！スーパーサイヤ人孫悟飯)	Daisuke Nishio	Hiroshi Toda	Masayuki Uchiyama	February 7, 1990	May 24, 1997; August 11, 2005 (re-dub)
Vegeta attempts to finish off Gohan to prevent him from looking at his artificial moon and transforming when Yajirobe jumps in and stops him by cutting through his armor with his sword, resulting in a heroic distraction. As Vegeta pummels Yajirobe for his interference, Gohan recovers, and then on Goku's telepathic commands, he looks at Vegeta's moon and transforms into a Great Ape. However, unlike Vegeta, Gohan can't control himself in this state. Alerted quickly by Goku and Krillin's cries for him to defeat Vegeta, Gohan quickly regains some of his consciousness and resumes the fight, pounding on Vegeta. Vegeta is able to cut off Gohan's tail in midair, but as Gohan falls to Earth he lands on and crushes the Saiyan Prince before finally reverting to his normal form. Defeated and severely injured, Vegeta pulls out his remote and summons his spaceship. As he crawls toward it, Krillin attempts to kill him with Yajirobe's kitana. Goku tells Krillin to stop and let Vegeta go, hoping that the act of mercy can change the Saiyan Prince. His life spared, Vegeta promises the surviving Z Fighters that he will return and have his revenge as he leaves Earth in his spaceship for good. The Battle for Earth ends in victory for the Z Fighters, but at the cost of the lives of Yamcha, Chiaotzu, Tien and Piccolo as well as Kami and Earth's Dragon Balls.
36	27	"We're Off Into Space! The Star of Hope is Piccolo's Homeland" / "A New Goal... Namek" [Picking Up the Pieces] Transliteration: "Tobidase Uchū e! Kibō no Hoshi wa Pikkoro no Furusato" (Japanese: 飛び出せ宇宙へ！希望の星はピッコロの故郷)	Tatsuya Orime	Katsuyuki Sumisawa	Tomekichi Takeuchi	February 14, 1990	September 13, 1997; August 15, 2005 (re-dub)
The exhausted Goku, Krillin, and Gohan won their battle, and Bulma, Chi-Chi, and the others arrive to help their friends. Learning of the death of Yamcha, Chiaotzu, Tien, Piccolo, and Kami, the Z Fighters are upset because without the Dragon Balls the others can't be wished back to life again, but luckily Krillin has an idea. He recalls overhearing Vegeta saying that it was the Nameks who created the Dragon Balls, so they decide to go to the planet Namek. The only problem is that it will take 4339.2516 years to reach Namek. They decide to use Nappa's spaceship, because Saiyan spaceships travel much faster.
37	27	"Mysterious Yunzabit! The Search for Kami-sama's Spaceship" / "A New Goal... Namek" [Plans for Departure] Transliteration: "Nazo no Yunzabitto! Kamisama no Uchūsen o Sagase" (Japanese: 謎のユンザビット！神様の宇宙船を探せ)	Jōhei Matsuura	Katsuyuki Sumisawa	Mitsuo Shindō	February 21, 1990	September 13, 1997; August 16, 2005 (re-dub)
Bulma destroys the Saiyan ship by accidentally pressing the self-destruct button on its remote. Mr. Popo arrives, and tells them that he knows of another spaceship: the Namekian ship that Kami used to come to Earth when he was a boy. A hesitant Bulma goes with Mr. Popo despite her fear of him and together they uncover the secret of how to control the ship.
38	28	"Blast-off for Planet Namek! The Terror Awaiting Gohan & Co." / "Journey to Namek" [Nursing Wounds] Transliteration: "Namekkusei Iki Hasshin! Gohantachi o Matsu Kyōfu" (Japanese: ナメック星行き発進！悟飯たちを待つ恐怖)	Yoshihiro Ueda	Keiji Terui	Masayuki Uchiyama	February 28, 1990	September 13, 1997; August 17, 2005 (re-dub)
Because the ship works on voice commands given in the Namekian language, Mr. Popo teaches Bulma a little of the language so she can operate the spaceship. Meanwhile, Goku, Krillin, and Gohan recover from their wounds. Because Goku's injuries are worse, he has to stay in the hospital after Gohan and Krillin are completely recovered. Gohan and Krillin decide to accompany Bulma on her journey to planet Namek.
39	28	"Friends or Foes? Children of the Mysterious Giant Spaceship" / "Journey to Namek" [Friends or Foes?] Transliteration: "Teki ka Mikata ka? Nazo no Kyodai Uchūsen no Kodomotachi" (Japanese: 敵か味方か？謎の巨大宇宙船の子供たち)	Daisuke Nishio	Takao Koyama	Yukio Ebisawa	March 7, 1990	September 13, 1997; August 18, 2005 (re-dub)
Gohan, Krillin, and Bulma blast off to Namek. On the way, they run into what appears to be an invisible spaceship. They enter the ship, only to discover that it's full of traps. After getting through what seems to be all the traps, Gohan, and Krillin feast on a table full of food despite warnings from Bulma. They soon realize their mistake when children with guns holding Bulma hostage come into the picture, forcing the two young warriors to stand down in order to ensure her safety.

== Notes ==
- The episode "Escape from Piccolo" was scheduled to premiere in syndication on November 15, 1996, but was pulled by Saban, due to questionable content. The dub of this episode instead debuted on VHS ten months later in October 1997, when the second season was airing in syndication. It later premiered on television in September 1998 via Cartoon Network's Toonami block.
- The 1997 dub episodes "A New Goal... Namek" and "Journey to Namek" were produced as part of Funimation and Saban's second broadcast season of the show, and premiered in the fall of 1997, four months after the previous episode "The Battle Ends."
