= Dragon Ball Z season 3 =

Dragon Ball Z
- Season 3
- Australian DVD release cover featuring Frieza in his Final Form
- No. of episodes: 33

Release
- Original network: Fuji Television
- Original release: January 23 – September 11, 1991

Season chronology
- ← Previous; Season 2 Next → Season 4

The third season of Dragon Ball Z anime series contains the Frieza arc, which comprises Part 2 of the Frieza Saga. The episodes are produced by Toei Animation, and are based on the final 26 volumes of the Dragon Ball manga series by Akira Toriyama.

The 33-episode season originally ran from January to September 1991 in Japan on Fuji Television. The first English airing of the series was on Cartoon Network where Funimation Entertainment's dub of the series ran from September to November 1999.

Funimation released the season in a box set, and in June 2009, announced that they would be re-releasing Dragon Ball Z in a new seven volume set called the "Dragon Boxes". Based on the original series masters with frame-by-frame restoration, and is uncut. The first set was released November 10, 2009.

== Episode list ==
No. overall	Initial dub no.	Translated title/Funimation's dub title Original Japanese title	Directed by	Written by	Animation directed by	Original release date	English air date
75	61	"Thou Who Hast Gathered the Seven Balls... Now Speak Forth the Password!" / "Password is Porunga"; Transliteration: "Nanatsu no Tama o Soroeshi Mono yo... Sā Aikotoba o Ie!" (Japanese: 七ッの玉を揃えし者よ…さあ合言葉を言え！)	Mitsuo Hashimoto	Katsuyuki Sumisawa	Yukio Ebisawa	January 23, 1991	September 21, 1999
While Goku is recovering in the rejuvenation chamber inside Frieza's spaceship following the end of the Ginyu Force, Krillin heads to Guru's to get the password. Gohan is left behind to guard the Dragon Balls while Vegeta, the prince of the Saiyans, is taking a nap. On his way to meet Guru again, Krillin sees Dende flying in the opposite direction. He meets up with him, and Dende tells him that he has been sent to deliver the password, and together they head back to Frieza's ship. Once they arrive, they decide to make the wish now so that Vegeta won't get his wish of immortality. Meanwhile, Frieza discovers Nail has been purposely stalling him and threatens to make a move to finish him off. Nail, however, says that killing him won't do any good because Dende is probably the one who has the password for the Namekian Dragon Balls, and that he has given them to the Earthlings. Finally getting the point a little too late, Frieza becomes angry and flies back to his ship. When he tries to contact the Ginyu Force, he finds out that they were all slaughtered by Vegeta, Gohan and Krillin, and vows to exterminate his enemies before they obtain a wish from the Dragon Balls. Dende, Krillin and Gohan bring the Dragon Balls to a nearby island, and Dende summons the Eternal Dragon. This dragon is revealed to be a Namekian dragon with two black horns named Porunga, and upon his rise, the skies of Planet Namek suddenly becomes dark, much to Frieza's surprise, as he continues frantically dashing to prevent the heroes from ruining his dream of eternal life.
76	62	"Kami-sama Also Returns to Life! Piccolo is Resurrected by Super Shen Long" / "Piccolo's Return"; Transliteration: "Kamisama mo Ikikaetta! Sūpā Shen Long de Pikkoro ga Fukkatsu" (Japanese: 神様も生き返った！超神龍でピッコロが復活)	Tatsuya Orime	Katsuyuki Sumisawa	Masahiro Shimanuki	January 30, 1991	September 22, 1999
Thanks to Dende, the Eternal Dragon of Namek, Porunga, has been summoned. Unlike Shenron, the Earth's dragon, Porunga has the power to grant any three wishes. Through King Kai, Piccolo tells Gohan to use the first wish to bring him back to life, and the second to bring him to Namek. The dragon grants these two wishes. While they are thinking of their third wish, Vegeta wakes up, sensing Frieza and learning that Gohan, Krillin and Dende have taken the Dragon Balls from him. Furious, he flies over to the trio, demanding that they wish for his immortality. Before they can decide what to do, Porunga suddenly disappears and the Dragon Balls reappear as stones. A heartbroken Dende informs everyone that Guru has died, and that the Dragon Balls that he created were gone with him. To make matters worse, the enraged Frieza has arrived.
77	63	"Birth of the Mightiest Warrior!? Nail and Piccolo Merge" / "The Fusion"; Transliteration: "Saikyō Senshi no Tanjō ka!? Neiru to Pikkoro ga Gattai" (Japanese: 最強戦士の誕生か!?ネイルとピッコロが合体)	Minoru Okazaki	Katsuyuki Sumisawa	Minoru Maeda	February 6, 1991	September 23, 1999
Furious at being stripped of his wish for eternal life by Dende, Krillin, Gohan, and Vegeta, Frieza unleashes his true power before proceeding to fight with them by firing energy blasts at his targets. Meanwhile, Piccolo comes across Nail, who is wounded by Frieza, but still alive. Nail tells Piccolo to fuse with him, because this transformation might give him enough power to defeat Frieza. Though he is reluctant, Piccolo agrees. He and Nail become one in Piccolo's body and with his newfound strength, Piccolo continues towards Frieza's ship. Back at the battle, Frieza shoots a blast at Krillin, Gohan, and Dende, but Vegeta deflects it, shielding the boys just in time. Confident in his new strength, Vegeta tells Frieza that he will defeat him, because he will soon become a Super Saiyan, the thing that Frieza fears most. Believing this statement to be a lie, Frieza tries to pummel Vegeta, but as the two grapple and power up, Vegeta's power level grows much higher than Frieza had anticipated, and he proves to be Frieza's equal, which causes Frieza's scouter to explode. After they stop their duel, Frieza admits that Vegeta wasn't bluffing, and the Saiyan Prince encourages him to transform and show his true power.
78	64	"A Nightmare Super-Transformation!! Frieza's Battle Power of One Million" / "Fighting Power: One Million?"; Transliteration: "Akumu no Chōhenshin!! Sentōryoku Hyakuman no Furīza" (Japanese: 悪夢の超変身!!戦闘力100万のフリーザ)	Yoshihiro Ueda	Katsuyuki Sumisawa	Mitsuo Shindō	February 13, 1991	September 24, 1999
As Frieza begins to transform to the Z Fighters' amazement, the alien tyrant grows two inches and destroys his battle armor in the process, revealing a white-colored bodily armor with three more purple areas on which Vegeta mockingly describes as a "transformation". Before continuing to change, Frieza asks Vegeta to surrender and obey him once again, but the Saiyan Prince refuses. Frieza then decides to tell Vegeta that it was actually he who destroyed planet Vegeta long ago, wiping out the Saiyan race including his father King Vegeta when the prince was a young boy. Vegeta claims that he knew all along, which was why he hated Frieza so much. Frieza also reveals another secret that Vegeta's father had never experienced: he can transform. Eager to finally destroy Vegeta and his allies, Frieza transforms into a hideous giant and explains that in his new form, his power level is over one million. After destroying the island with an explosion of energy, Frieza locks on to Krillin, his first target, impales him on his left horn, and breaks his battle armour, horrifying Dende, Gohan, and even Vegeta.
79	65a	"Is This the End!? A Brutally Transcendent Power Attacks Gohan" / "Gohan Attacks"; Transliteration: "Koko made ka!? Kyōaku Chōzetsu Pawā ga Gohan o Osō" (Japanese: ここまでか!?凶悪超絶パワーが悟飯を襲う)	Tatsuya Orime	Aya Matsui	Masayuki Uchiyama	February 20, 1991	September 27, 1999
Having transformed into a larger state and gaining much more power, Frieza has mortally wounded Krillin with his left horn, and flings him into the Namekian sea. After seeing his friend attacked, Gohan tries to save him but Frieza blocks the young Saiyan, intending to let the Earthling die in his watery grave. Enraged, Gohan suddenly loses control of himself and unleashes a furious attack on Frieza, blasting him into the ground. Though he becomes powerful out of anger, his Masenko is not strong enough to kill Frieza, who gets up and powers up again for the second time. While Dende pulls the injured but still-living Krillin out of the water, Frieza pounds the inexperienced Gohan. Vegeta then unleashes an attack on Frieza with his full power, but Frieza is completely unfazed.
80	65b	"The Tide Suddenly Turned!! Piccolo, the Warrior Who Came Late" / "Piccolo the Super-Namek"; Transliteration: "Ikki ni Keisei Gyakuten!! Okurete Kita Senshi - Pikkoro" (Japanese: 一気に形勢逆転!!遅れてきた戦士・ピッコロ)	Jun'ichi Fujise	Aya Matsui	Mitsuo Shindō	February 27, 1991	September 27, 1999
Frieza pins Gohan to the ground and starts pressing his foot on his head to crush him, while Vegeta, who failed to extinguish Frieza with a variant of his Galick Gun, is frozen with fear. Dende, now using his healing powers given to him by Guru, heals Krillin's injuries and the Earthling cuts off Frieza's tail with a Destructo Disc, forcing him to stop torturing his friend. Krillin is able to distract Frieza long enough for Dende to heal Gohan as well. Though they are both back to full strength, it all seems useless because none of them are a match for Frieza. Suddenly, Piccolo finally arrives at the scene and tells them that he will take on Frieza alone. Krillin and Gohan don't understand why he would do this, but Piccolo insists. With his new strength acquired from fusion, he is confident that he can take down Frieza.
81	66	"Piccolo's Self-Confidence! I Will Be the One to Defeat Freeza" / "Deja Vu"; Transliteration: "Pikkoro no Jishin! Furīza o Taosu no wa Ore da" (Japanese: ピッコロの自信！フリーザを倒すのはオレだ)	Yoshihiro Ueda; Storyboarded by : Daisuke Nishio	Takao Koyama	Masahiro Shimanuki	March 6, 1991	September 28, 1999
Piccolo and Frieza begin to fight and with his new power, Piccolo is able to hold his own with Frieza. Also, since he is fused with Nail, he is familiar with the way Frieza fights. Inside the isolation chamber in Frieza's spaceship, Goku senses that Piccolo has arrived, and that his strength has dramatically increased. It seems that Piccolo is going to defeat Frieza.
82	67	"Attack, Goku!! An Enraged Freeza's Second Transformation" / "Frieza's Second Transformation"; Transliteration: "Shutsugeki da Gokū!! Gekido no Furīza ga Daini no Henshin" (Japanese: 出撃だ悟空!!激怒のフリーザが第2の変身)	Kazuhito Kikuchi	Takao Koyama	Mitsuo Shindō	March 13, 1991	September 29, 1999
Piccolo is beating Frieza, but the evil tyrant has another trick up his sleeve: another transformation. He changes into an even more hideous beast, with his head getting bigger, his bodily armor taking the shape of a regular battle armor, and his body growing spikes. In this form, Frieza is even more powerful than before. Piccolo begins to fight the new Frieza, but it is clear that Frieza is more powerful. Piccolo is no longer able to hold him off, and soon enough, Frieza starts firing his rapid-energy bullets at the Super Namekian. Overcome by his rage once more, Gohan races to Piccolo's rescue.
83	68	"Fear Me!! Freeza Does Battle with a Third Transformation" / "Another Transformation?"; Transliteration: "Kyōfu Shiro!! Furīza wa Sando no Henshin de Shōbu Suru" (Japanese: 恐怖しろ!!フリーザは3度の変身で勝負する)	Yoshihiro Ueda	Katsuyuki Sumisawa	Masayuki Uchiyama	March 20, 1991	September 30, 1999
Just as Frieza is about to finish Piccolo off, Gohan jumps in into the fray, stopping him with a failed attack. He fires his Masenko at Frieza, but though the hideous tyrant is nearly overcome by the attack, he manages to deflect it. Realizing that Gohan is one of the few surviving Saiyans beside Vegeta, Frieza decides to transform into his final form to finish them and the others once and for all. Vegeta, however, comes up with a plan to stop him: he tells Krillin to severely injure him, insisting that when Dende heals him, he will become much more powerful. Krillin reluctantly hits Vegeta with a powerful blast, and the Saiyan falls to the ground. He stumbles over to Dende, demanding that he be healed. Dende refuses and flees from him, due to Vegeta's previous atrocities against the Namekians, which causes the Saiyan Prince to lose consciousness. As his transformation nears competition, Frieza sees that Dende has been healing his opponents. When Gohan and Krillin asks Dende why he didn't heal Vegeta, he states that Vegeta is a heartless killer like Frieza, but Nail, in Piccolo's body, convinces him to do it, ensuring that when he and Piccolo defeat Frieza, then they will have a score to settle with the Saiyan. Frieza completes his transformation, and Dende finally heals Vegeta, who furiously kicks him away as a token of "gratitude". With everyone standing together, Frieza finally completes his transformation, shattering his third form. When the smoke clears, Frieza appeared as a small alien being, with his entire white body with purple sectors; his final true form.
84	69	"The Death of Dende... Come Forth! Intense, Wide-Open Power" / "Dende's Demise"; Transliteration: "Dende no Shi... Dete Koi! Tobikiri Zenkai Pawā" (Japanese: デンデの死…でてこい！とびきり全開パワー)	Tatsuya Orime	Katsuyuki Sumisawa	Yukio Ebisawa	March 27, 1991	October 1, 1999
Now in his final form, Frieza seems unstoppable. With a single energy beam, he immediately kills Dende, since he is the reason the tyrant's enemies came back from near-death, via the young Namekian's healing powers. Angry at Frieza's murderous act, Piccolo, Gohan, and Krillin throw everything they've got at him, but Frieza easily dodges them. When Frieza fires the same blast at Gohan, Vegeta steps in and knocks him down, just in time for the beam to miss his victim. Vegeta tells Frieza that he has now become a Super Saiyan. Unafraid, Frieza takes him on.
85	70	"How I've Waited for this Moment!!! Son Goku Revived" / "The Renewed Goku"; Transliteration: "Machi ni Matta ze, Kono Shunkan!!! Son Gokū ga Fukkatsu da" (Japanese: 待ちに待ったぜ、この瞬間!!!孫悟空が復活だ)	Kazuhito Kikuchi	Katsuyuki Sumisawa	Masayuki Uchiyama	April 3, 1991	October 4, 1999
Despite his dramatic increase in power, Vegeta is no match for Frieza. It seems that he is not a Super Saiyan after all. Gohan, Krillin, and Piccolo helplessly look on in horror as Frieza incapacitates Vegeta and tortures him. Luckily, Goku has finally recovered. He breaks out of the healing chamber, and flies to the battlefield.
86	71	"Such Regret...!! Vegeta, Pride of the Saiyans, Dies" / "The End of Vegeta"; Transliteration: "Munen...!! Hokori Takaki Saiyajin Bejīta Shisu" (Japanese: 無念…!!誇り高きサイヤ人・ベジータ死す)	Yoshihiro Ueda	Katsuyuki Sumisawa	Mitsuo Shindō	April 10, 1991	October 5, 1999
Goku has entered the battlefield stronger than ever and prepares to fight Frieza alone. It seems that Goku might become a Super Saiyan, as he easily deflects Frieza's energy attacks. As Vegeta taunts Frieza, claiming that Goku is the "real Super Saiyan", the tyrant easily finishes him with an energy beam to the heart and a cruel bout of laughter. With his dying breaths, Vegeta tells Goku the truth what Frieza has done: he had destroyed Planet Vegeta and eradicated most of the Saiyan race (including Vegeta's father King Vegeta and Goku's father Bardock) and begs Goku to defeat Frieza. After burying Vegeta, Goku prepares to fight Frieza, the tyrant whom no one has beaten yet.
87	72	"The Curtain Rises over the Ultimate Battle!! I Am Going to Defeat You!" / "The Ultimate Battle"; Transliteration: "Chō Kessen no Makuake da!! Omēdake wa Ora ga Taosu" (Japanese: 超決戦の幕開けだ!!おめえだけはオラが倒す)	Akihiko Yamaguchi; Storyboarded by : Harume Kosaka	Aya Matsui	Masahiro Shimanuki	April 17, 1991	October 6, 1999
With new understanding of the Saiyans, Goku vows to avenge them by defeating Frieza. Both of these warriors match each other's moves with great speed and strength. Then, Frieza fires a blast at Namek, causing a volcanic eruption.
88	73	"The Two Superpowers Collide! A Fistfight Where Both Turn Serious!!!" / "Clash of the Super Powers"; Transliteration: "Gekitotsu no Ni Dai Chō Pawā! Honki Dōshi no Nikudan Sen!!!" (Japanese: 激突の2大超パワー！本気同士の肉弾戦!!!)	Kazuhito Kikuchi	Aya Matsui	Masayuki Uchiyama	April 24, 1991	October 7, 1999
As the fight continues, Goku attacks from underwater upon realizing that Frieza can't sense power levels. As Goku seems to be in control, Frieza uses his mind to use rocks to attack Goku so he can trap him in an energy ball that will explode if it touches anything but Frieza, and it doesn't look good for Goku. Although Frieza launches the energy ball towards Namek when he grows bored, Goku manages to break free at the last possible moment.
89	74	"Freeza's Terrible Declaration! I Will Defeat You Without Using My Hands" / "Frieza's Boast"; Transliteration: "Furīza Kyōfu no Sengen! Te o Tsukawazu Omae o Taosu" (Japanese: フリーザ恐怖の宣言！手を使わずお前を倒す)	Yoshihiro Ueda; Storyboarded by : Kazuhisa Takenouchi	Aya Matsui	Yukio Ebisawa	May 1, 1991	October 8, 1999
To prove that he's the strongest of all, Frieza uses only his feet and not his hands to fight Goku. While it seems that Frieza has the advantage, Goku manages to land some solid blows, making the tyrant break his word and use his hands. Meanwhile, Bulma finds a frog, unaware that it's Captain Ginyu. Bulma makes a universal translator for Captain Ginyu, who immediately uses the newfound gift of speech to switch bodies with her.
90	75	"That Was No Idle Boast!! Son Goku, an Audacious, Wonderful Guy" / "Bold and Fearless"; Transliteration: "Hattari ja nē zo!! Daitan Suteki na Yatsu - Son Gokū" (Japanese: ハッタリじゃねえぞ!!大胆素敵な奴・孫悟空)	Yoshihiro Ueda	Aya Matsui	Minoru Maeda	May 8, 1991	October 11, 1999
To ensure Goku is defeated, Frieza powers up to 50% of his maximum and it seems that not even Goku can handle it, even with his Kaio-ken. Ginyu finds the other heroes in Bulma's body and prepares to have his revenge.
91	76	"Showdown!! The Embodiment of Flame in a 20-Times Kaio-ken Kamehame-Ha" / "Embodiment of Fire"; Transliteration: "Ketchaku da!! Honō no Keshin Nijūbai Kaiōken no Kamehameha" (Japanese: 決着だ!!炎の化身20倍界王拳のカメハメ波)	Jun'ichi Fujise; Storyboarded by : Daisuke Nishio	Aya Matsui	Mitsuo Shindō	May 15, 1991	October 12, 1999
Captain Ginyu prepares his revenge by switching with Piccolo, but Gohan is able to throw Bulma (as a frog) in the way to get her body back. Meanwhile, Goku is being beaten up by Frieza with his power increase and tossed into the Namekian sea. But as he is held by the monster's power and loses his consciousness in an early stage of drowning, he has a vision showing what Frieza could do to Earth. Rocked and inspired by the vision, Goku angrily powers up with the 20x Kaio-ken, overpowers Frieza, and fires his Super Kamehameha. It seems that Goku has finally destroyed Frieza, and the universe is finally rid of him for good. In the end, the 20x Kaio-ken attack with a Kamehameha fails to kill Frieza, as it turns out that both of their attacks cancelled each other out.
92	77	"A Super-Huge Genki Dama — I'm Playing My Last Card!!" / "Trump Card"; Transliteration: "Chō Tokudai no Genki Dama Kore ga Saikyō no Kirifuda da!!" (Japanese: 超特大の元気玉これが最後の切り札だ!!)	Mitsuo Hashimoto	Hiroshi Toda	Masayuki Uchiyama	May 22, 1991	October 13, 1999
Enraged at the close call, the tyrant tries to destroy Goku once and for all, who has used up most of his power. In the middle of what seems to be the turning point for the worse, Goku hears the voice of Vegeta speaking to him telepathically. Vegeta, wondering if this is all that Goku has to offer, states once again that whether or not Goku accepts his heritage as a Saiyan, he must kill Frieza to avenge the Saiyan race. As the situation is getting bleaker, Goku luckily has one more trick up his sleeve: the Spirit Bomb.
93	78	"Keep the Chance Alive!! Piccolo's Suicide Support Strike" / "Keep the Chance Alive!!"; Transliteration: "Chansu o Ikase!! Pikkoro Sutemi no Engo Shageki" (Japanese: チャンスを生かせ!!ピッコロ捨身の援護射撃)	Kazuhito Kikuchi	Hiroshi Toda	Masahiro Shimanuki	May 29, 1991	October 14, 1999
As King Kai and the others watch the battle on Namek, the Ginyu Force (with Jeice as a substitute leader) arrives to take over the planet, but Yamcha, Tien, and Chiaotzu are ready for a fight. Back on Namek, Frieza discovers Goku's Spirit Bomb and plans to stop it. Suddenly, Piccolo steps in to give Goku more time, blindsiding Frieza with a sneak attack.
94	79	"The Incredible Destructive Force of the Genki Dama!! Who Will Survive?!" / "Power of the Spirit"; Transliteration: "Genki Dama no Chō Hakairyoku!! Ikinokotta no wa Dare da!?" (Japanese: 元気玉の超破壊力!!生き残ったのは誰だ!?)	Yoshihiro Ueda	Hiroshi Toda	Yukio Ebisawa	June 5, 1991	October 15, 1999
The battle on King Kai's planet begins with the Z-Fighters against the Ginyu Force and it seems that our heroes' training is paying off. Piccolo does his best for Goku to complete the Spirit Bomb, but it becomes obvious that Frieza will eventually win the battle. At the last moment, the Spirit Bomb is completed, and Goku hurls it at Frieza. Despite Frieza's desperate attempt to repel the attack, he is unable to do so, and the Spirit Bomb explodes on him, seemingly destroying him.
95	80	"Transformed At Last!! Son Goku, the Legendary Super Saiyan" / "Transformed at Last"; Transliteration: "Tsui ni Henshin!! Densetsu no Sūpā Saiyajin Son Gokū" (Japanese: ついに変身!!伝説の超サイヤ人・孫悟空)	Yamauchi Shigeyasu	Hiroshi Toda	Minoru Maeda	June 12, 1991	October 18, 1999
It looks like the battle is over, as Frieza has been seemingly defeated and the Ginyu Force has been beaten off King Kai's planet to Hell by the remaining Z-Fighters. As everyone celebrates, Frieza reappears and spares no time attacking; first he fires a blast at Goku, but Piccolo hurls himself in front of it and takes the blast, knocking him out. Frieza fires another blast and uses it to blow up Krillin, killing him. Fueled by rage at the loss of his best friend, Goku's power increases exponentially, and he ascends to become a Super Saiyan, with his hair turning spiky and gold and his eyes becoming green.
96	81	"An Explosion of Anger!! Goku, Avenge Everyone's Deaths" / "Explosion of Anger"; Transliteration: "Ikari Bakuhatsu!! Gokū yo, Minna no Kataki o Uttekure" (Japanese: 怒り爆発!!悟空よ、みんなの仇を討ってくれ)	Jun'ichi Fujise	Katsuyuki Sumisawa	Masayuki Uchiyama	June 19, 1991	October 19, 1999
Much to Frieza's big horror, Goku has finally become a Super Saiyan, surrounded by a gold aura, the fuel of this power being his anger towards Frieza. As Gohan takes Piccolo to Goku's ship, the furious Super Saiyan starts to pound on Frieza as the tyrant fires back, but none of his attacks work against Goku, now that he is a Super Saiyan.
97	82	"The Destruction of Planet Namek!? A Demonic Flash Pierces the Ground" / "Namek's Destruction?"; Transliteration: "Namekkusei Shōmetsu ka!? Daichi o Tsuranuku Ma no Senkō" (Japanese: ナメック星消滅か!?大地を貫く魔の閃光)	Kazuhito Kikuchi	Katsuyuki Sumisawa	Mitsuo Shindō	June 26, 1991	October 20, 1999
Not willing to be beaten despite his fear, Frieza fires an attack to destroy Namek so Goku will be killed, as the Super Saiyan is unable to stop the attack. However, Frieza held back too much power, since he feared that he would be hurt by the blast, and the planet isn't destroyed. Nonetheless, the blast has destabilized Namek's core, and the planet is going to blow up.
98	83	"I Will Be the One Who Wins... Risking Survival, a Final Attack" / "A Final Attack"; Transliteration: "Katsu no wa Ore Da... Ikinokori o Kaketa Saishū Kōgeki" (Japanese: 勝つのはオレだ…生き残りをかけた最終攻撃)	Yoshihiro Ueda	Katsuyuki Sumisawa	Kazuya Hisada	July 10, 1991	October 21, 1999
Frieza reveals that Namek is set to explode in 5 minutes, as Gohan finds Bulma and gets back to the ship. Frieza decides to power up to 100% to finish the fight. Instead of stopping him, Goku has let Frieza go to full power, with the idea that if he beats Frieza at his full power, he will never fight him again, and also because he wants to take down Frieza at his best to fully avenge Krillin. As they continue their fight, it seems that Frieza has regained the upper hand now that he has powered up to his maximum, but Goku claims that the battle is far from over.
99	84	"Shen Long, Run Yourself Through Space!! The Time of Namek's Destruction Draws Near" / "Approaching Destruction"; Transliteration: "Shen Long yo Uchū o Hashire!! Semaru Namekkusei Shōmetsu no Toki" (Japanese: 神龍よ宇宙を走れ!!迫るナメック星消滅の時)	Yamauchi Shigeyasu	Katsuyuki Sumisawa	Yukio Ebisawa	July 17, 1991	October 22, 1999
As the battle on Namek continues, Kami and Mr. Popo have found all of the restored Dragon Balls, giving King Kai an idea that might save everyone on Namek, bring back all of the fallen Namekians back to life, including Guru. Back on Namek, it turns out that Goku still isn't using his full power yet, and he regains the edge over Frieza. Enraged, Frieza powers up to his absolute maximum and charges at Goku. In response, Goku fires a Kamehameha at Frieza, setting off a beam struggle.
100	85	"I Am Son Goku's Son!! Gohan Returns to the Battlefield" / "Gohan Returns"; Transliteration: "Boku wa Son Gokū no Musuko da!! Gohan, Futatabi Kessenjō e" (Japanese: ボクは孫悟空の息子だ!!悟飯、再び決戦場へ)	Jun'ichi Fujise; Storyboarded by : Mitsuo Hashimoto	Katsuyuki Sumisawa	Masayuki Uchiyama	July 24, 1991	October 25, 1999
Everyone that has been killed by Frieza and his henchmen on Namek are resurrected, but so far, Guru isn't back yet. Meanwhile, Goku finally decides to use his full power, giving him the edge in his beam struggle with Frieza. Refusing to admit defeat, Frieza breaks off of the attack and blindsides Goku before knocking him deep into the planet and triggering a volcanic eruption, apparently killing Goku. With Goku seemingly beaten by Frieza's attack, Gohan returns to the battle to avenge his father, and to make sure that the cold tyrant dies along with the planet. However, even though Frieza returns to 50% of his power, he is no match for Gohan. Enraged by Frieza's actions, Gohan powers up again and pounds Frieza, who then decides to use 100% of his power again. Before Frieza can land the killing blow, however, Guru returns to life, and Goku reappears survived, and orders Gohan to leave Namek.
101	86	"I'm Staying on This Planet!! A Final Wish Towards Victory" / "The Last Wish"; Transliteration: "Ore wa Kono Hoshi ni Nokoru!! Shōri e no Saigo no Negai" (Japanese: オレはこの星に残る!!勝利への最後の願い)	Kazuhito Kikuchi	Takao Koyama	Mitsuo Shindō	July 31, 1991	October 26, 1999
With Guru back to life, the Namekian Dragon Balls have been restored as well, with Porunga ready to grant the third wish. As Dende prepares to complete the final phase of King Kai's plan, Frieza flies towards Porunga to have his wish granted as well, and it seems that Goku may not be able to stop Frieza in time.
102	87	"Let's Get It On!! Two Remain on a Vanishing Planet" / "Duel on a Vanishing Planet"; Transliteration: "Tokoton Yarōze!! Kieyuku Hoshi ni Nokotta Futari" (Japanese: ととことんやろうぜ!!消えゆく星に残った二人)	Daisuke Nishio	Takao Koyama	Masayuki Uchiyama	August 7, 1991	October 27, 1999
Since Frieza is unable to speak Namekian, his wish isn't granted, while Porunga grants Dende's wish to transport everyone from Namek to Earth, except for Goku and Frieza (with the last condition being made at Goku's behest, after he insisted on staying behind to finish his fight with Frieza and avenge Krillin's death). Everyone is upset with Goku's decision, as it seems that there is no escape from the impending explosion.
103	88	"Pathos of Freeza! Once He Starts Shaking, He's Unstoppable!!" / "Pathos of Frieza"; Transliteration: "Aware Furīza! Furue Dashitara Tomaranai!!" (Japanese: 哀れフリーザ！震えだしたら止まらない!!)	Yoshihiro Ueda	Hiroshi Toda	Kazuya Hisada	August 14, 1991	October 28, 1999
As Namek gets closer to its explosion, it looks like Goku can beat Frieza with ease, as he has finally stopped holding back and Frieza is getting weaker from the strain of his 100% power state. Finally, Goku decides to leave, stating that Frieza has already lost to a fighter superior to him, but the tyrant won't give up that easily. He fires a pink energy disc that scars Goku's face, and as soon as Goku turns into a Super Saiyan again, Frieza controls the disc to chase him.
104	89	"Goku's Declaration of Victory!! As Freeza Destroys Himself..." / "Frieza Defeated!!"; Transliteration: "Gokū no Shōri Sengen da!! Furīza ga Jimetsu suru Toki..." (Japanese: 悟空の勝利宣言だ!!フリーザが自滅する時…)	Yamauchi Shigeyasu	Hiroshi Toda	Yukio Ebisawa	August 21, 1991	October 29, 1999
Frieza fires a second energy disc, and the pair will follow Goku until they hit him or anything else. Even so, Goku has the situation under control as the battle draws to a close end. Eventually, Frieza is cut in half by his own energy disk from behind. Frieza begs for mercy, and Goku, being the kind person he is, gives him some of his power to live and escape the planet's destruction.
105	90	"Freeza Defeated!! A Single Blast Packed with a Totality of Rage" / "Mighty Blast of Rage"; Transliteration: "Furīza Yabureru!! Subete no Ikari o Kometa Ichigeki" (Japanese: フリーザ敗れる!!すべての怒りをこめた一撃)	Mitsuo Hashimoto	Hiroshi Toda	Masayuki Uchiyama	August 28, 1991	November 1, 1999
As Guru enjoys seeing his people alive on Earth, the time has come for him to go, but he passes his powers to Moori, as the next Eldest Namek. Back on Namek, Goku once more advises Frieza to give up his evil ways and live the rest of his life peacefully. However, as the Super Saiyan flies away toward Frieza's spaceship to depart from the dying planet, Frieza refuses to accept defeat and instead uses the power given to him by Goku in a last-ditch attack to finish off Goku off, but an enraged Goku easily finishes off Frieza with a Angry Kamehameha.
106	91	"Planet Namek's Great Explosion!! Goku Disappears into Space" / "Namek's Explosion... Goku's End?"; Transliteration: "Namekkusei Dai Bakuhatsu!! Uchū ni Kieta Gokū" (Japanese: ナメック星大爆発!!宇宙に消えた悟空)	Kazuhito Kikuchi	Hiroshi Toda	Mitsuo Shindō	September 4, 1991	November 2, 1999
With Frieza finally defeated, Goku flies to Frieza's spaceship to escape from Namek, but to no avail, since it was severely damaged by Vegeta. Goku flees from the ship as it gets swallowed by a river of lava, and is apparently trapped with no other way to escape, prompting him to scream both in frustration and despair as Planet Namek finally blows up with everything else on it, including his Capsule Corporation spaceship. Even though it looks like Goku died as a result of Namek's explosion, Bulma and the others have an idea that could work, using the Namekian Dragon Balls, once restored, to bring everyone else back - including Goku. However, King Kai reveals that using the Namekian Dragon Balls would bring Goku and Krillin back to where Namek used to be and cause them to die again due to a lack of oxygen.
107	92	"Son Goku Survived — The Z Warriors All Resurrected!!" / "Goku's Alive!!"; Transliteration: "Ikiteita Son Gokū Zetto Senshi ga Zen'in Fukkatsu da!!" (Japanese: 生きていた孫悟空Z戦士が全員復活だ!!)	Daisuke Nishio	Hiroshi Toda	Minoru Maeda	September 11, 1991	November 3, 1999
As it looks like Goku and Krillin can't come back, Vegeta has an idea: wish their souls to Earth and then wish them back to life, which is done for Krillin. Yamcha is also brought back to life. After another 130 days, Tien and Chiaotzu are also back to life, but Porunga says Goku can't be wished back to life because he managed to survived Namek's destruction, and knows that he doesn't want to return to Earth yet. However, Goku will return later.
