= Dragon Ball Z Collectible Card Game =

Out-of-print trading card game

Dragon Ball Z Trading Card Game
- Card back of Dragon Ball Z CCG
- Publishers: Score Entertainment; Panini America
- Players: 2+
- Playing time: 30-60 Min
- Chance: Some
- Skills: Card playing Arithmetic; Basic Reading Ability

Dragon Ball Z Trading Card Game (originally the Dragon Ball Z Collectible Card Game and the Dragon Ball GT Trading Card Game) is an out-of-print trading card game based on the Dragon Ball series created by Akira Toriyama. The game was produced by Score Entertainment and uses screen captures of the anime to attempt to recreate the famous events and battles seen in the anime. Score then sold the rights to Panini which eventually ceased publishing.

The game first saw release in 2000, with the "Saiyan Saga" starter decks and booster packs. As of 2006, the game has had eighteen expansions, one "virtual" set, several "Subsets", and many promotional cards, or "Promos".

A brand new game, the Dragon Ball Collectible Card Game, with completely different rules was released by Bandai in July 2008. This game was discontinued quickly.

A remake of the original Score game was released on October 18, 2014, by the Panini brand. The remake, designed by a Panini America employee and the DBZCCG World Champion Aik Tongtharadol, featured many of the design and game play elements of the original but with several changes to ensure more fluid and clear game play.

In January 2017, it was announced that Dragon Ball Super Card Game, developed by Bandai, was being released and the game was discontinued.

== Cards ==
Fighting in the card game is represented by "Physical Combat" cards, which designate the martial arts skills performed by the Z Fighters and their enemies, and "Energy Combat" cards, which portrays the attacks using ki, used by the Characters. Cards portraying the events of the series were known as "Non-Combat" cards in the DBZ CCG, then as "Non-Combat Setups" in the DBGT TCG. In the DBZ TCG, these cards are known as "Support" cards. Both of the Trading Card Game releases also sport cards called "Event Combat" cards, whereas they were referenced simply as "Combat" cards in the original Collectible Card Game.

Other card types in the Z-CCG and GT-TCG included Personality cards (which were used as Main Personalities or Allies), Mastery and Sensei Cards. Mastery cards were used in conjunction with a single style deck that could be used to declare a Tokui-Waza and would allow various benefits throughout the game, and covered Saiyan, Namekian, Red, Black, Orange and Blue styles. Later, a Freestyle Mastery was introduced. Sensei cards were required for Sensei decks, a game mechanic likened to the side deck system of the Yu-Gi-Oh! Trading Card Game and similar games.

Mastery cards were introduced with the Trunks Saga whereas Sensei Cards made their debut in the World Games Saga. Dragon Balls were classed as "Non-Combat" throughout the first few sets but from the Majin Buu Saga onwards they received the card-type of "Dragon Ball" to replace "Non-Combat", a trend that continued into the DBGT TCG.

=== Rarity ===
The rarity of cards are listed as follows:

1-Star: -Common- These cards are easily accessed through virtually any means.

2-Star: -Promo- For card collectors, the rarity values of "2-Star" promo cards are debated. A promo can often be easily obtained (for example, as a card in World Games Saga starter decks). Other times they require limited effort to obtain, such as being packaged along with other cards in Sub-Sets of various card sets (Broly Sub-Sets, for example). Some are extremely difficult to obtain, such as being available only to attendees, participants, runners-up, and winners of official Dragon Ball Z card tournaments (such as the Grand Kai Invitational).

3-Star: -Uncommon- The availability of these cards are notably lower than the "1-Star" cards, although they are still rather easy to obtain but some cards are a little hard to get.

4-Star: -Fixed- These are cards that are primarily featured or "pre-constructed" always or often in, most notably, starter decks. Such examples include the random Main Personality (MP) cards, which vary depending on the starter deck. Dragon Ball GT changed this slightly by making "4-Star" personality cards available in booster packs.

5-Star: -Rare- The availability of these cards are greatly lower than the "1-Star" and slightly lower than the "3-Star" cards. In booster packs, most of the time there is only one "5-Star" card inside, although this can vary mainly if "Foil" (or holo) cards are involved, distribution errors, or in the case of starter decks in GT, two rares are inside.

6-Star: -Ultra Rare- These cards are, for the most part, incredibly difficult to obtain. Several booster boxes can be opened before even one "6-Star" card is revealed. GT was the only version of the game that featured Styled cards as part of its ultra rare lineup, instead of simply personalities, Combat, or Non-Combat cards. In Z, in Base sets there were four Ultra Rares, and in Expansions there were two Ultra Rares. In GT, in Base sets there were eight Ultra Rares, while in the Expansion sets there were only four. Also to note that Ultra Rare cards are always in "Foil".

7-Star: -Premium/Uber Rare- Similar to Promo cards in several of the aspects, "7-Star" cards were mostly only available through sanctioned Score tournaments. The noted exception to this rule would be the two "Gotenks" personality cards randomly inserted into Buu Saga starter decks. While technically they do have seven stars, many fans of the card game feel that the easy availability of these two cards should not be treated as a Premium or Uber Rare card.

Foil Cards: In booster packs, one of every two or three packs would contain a foil card. These cards increased the value of an existing card, and so their effect would greatly depend on the collector or player.

Alternate (Alt.) Foil Cards: Every year at the Grand Kai Invitational, alternate versions of older cards were made and given to participants. These Alternate cards were made to edit most of the popular, but poorly written cards from Saiyan and Frieza Sagas such as Nappa's Physical Resistance and Vegeta's Quickness Drill. Score also made alternate versions of all the ultra-rares from Saiyan Saga to Babidi Saga. The way to tell the difference is the Foil pattern and the number was replaced with UR 1-22.

=== Promotional cards ===
Promotional cards are cards that are given away or sold for any number of reasons. In Score's Dragon Ball games, these include league and tournament prizes, judge gifts, video game or video/DVD prizes, the Capsule Corp Power Pack, wrapper redemption (mail-in promotion), and more. Certain cards, such as the "Fusion Frenzy" fantasy fusion Personalities, could be printed from Score's official Dragon Ball Z Trading Card Game website.

=== Distribution ===
Limited and Unlimited: Score often printed their cards on "Limited Print Runs", which meant that it was on a separate production line that would be discontinued after an uncertain amount of time. The "Limited" cards were distinguished from "Unlimited" cards with a symbol of a Dragon in Z or the GT symbol in GT. The value of "Limited" cards are greater than Unlimited, and certain Sub-Sets that are in "Unlimited" booster packs (such as Broly sets), would be marked as "Limited" regardless.

Booster Pack: A pack of cards containing ten, eleven, or twelve cards, usually with one rare card and a chance for a "Foil" card.

Starter Deck: A deck of cards (preconstructed in Z), that always had a level 1-3 and High Tech/Backer card of a Main Personality (MP). In Z there were always one rare and one foil, and in GT there were always two rares and one foil.

Booster Box: A box of booster packs, usually 24- or 36-card packs.

Starter Deck Box: A box of starter decks.

Additional cards in the sets include Personality cards, which are arguably the most important cards. Personality cards represent the various characters of the series, from warriors the likes of Goku and Cell, to supporting characters such as Oolong and Bulla. Sensei cards are modeled after the various martial arts teachers and leaders of the series, and hold a "side-deck" of sorts for the game. Drills were prominent in the Collectible Card Game and GT Trading Card Game, and were Non-Combat cards detailing training exercises. Mastery cards are a large part of most decks, relying on "Same Style Advantages" or "Tokui-Waza", to be most effective. Location/Battleground cards represented locales where battles and events in the series took place.

Decks in the game are built upon the principles of various colors (supposedly representing martial arts styles: Red - a more energy heavy attack style, Blue - a more defensive fighting style, Orange - tends to focus on allies, drills, and setups, and Black - which has a large amount of board manipulation), races (Saiyan - which is primarily a physical combat style and Namekian which focused on deck regeneration and manipulating the discard pile), or "Freestyle" cards, which represent no specific style, but can be interjected into a deck regardless of Tokui-Waza. A Tokui-Waza may only be declared if one has cards of one type (the aforementioned Red, Blue, Orange, Black, Saiyan, and Namekian), or all Freestyle cards. Saiyan and Namekian Tokui-Waza may only be declared if the player's Main Personality card is of Saiyan or Namekian descent, although Namekian style cards and Tokui-Waza were phased out during Dragon Ball GT. However, they returned in the DBZ Trading Card Game. Majin cards were introduced in the "World Games Saga" and lasted until the final set of the Collectible Card Game, "Kid Buu Saga". Most of these cards could only be played by a Personality with "Majin" in their name, but could not be used to declare a "Majin Tokui-Waza", although a card, "Majin Mastery" could be printed from Score's website and used in official play.

The Dragon Ball Z Collectible Card Game had 11 expansions, each representing a story arc, or "Saga" of the anime, such as the "Saiyan Saga" or "Cell Games Saga". Following the release of the Kid Buu Saga, Score shifted focus toward the Sagas of Dragon Ball GT, changing a few key rules, but it was still compatible with the previous releases. A fifth GT set, "Anthology", was planned, but never released.

The Dragon Ball Z Trading Card Game was released after the Dragon Ball GT game was finished. The rules of the game were changed drastically, making it incompatible with previous expansions. These cards are based on FUNimation's "Ultimate Uncut Edition" DVDs, and is called "Re-Z" by many fans.

== Expansions ==
=== Dragon Ball Z Collectible Card Game ===
==== Saiyan saga ====
The Saiyan Saga, being the first release of the game, was mainly untuned. For example, during this set and the next (Frieza Saga), what later became known as "Saiyan Heritage Only" cards could be played by "Villains, Goku, and Gohan only", meaning that even non-Saiyans such as Frieza and Guldo could use these cards. Other cards were ambiguous in nature, declaring such things as "does 1 life card in damage per combat until an energy attack kills it." These cards were officially assigned text corrections (errata) on Score's website to fit in with the wording of later expansions. On an entertainment scale, the cards suffered greatly from recycled quotes with quotes or part of the quotes being re-used on other cards.

The Saiyan Saga was released in Booster Packs, as well as Hero and Villain Starter Decks. Personality cards in this set included Goku, Gohan, Piccolo, Krillin, Yamcha, Tien, Chiaotzu, Yajirobe, Bulma, Chi-Chi, Raditz, Nappa, Vegeta, and Saibaimen.

==== Frieza saga ====
The first Booster Pack-only expansion, the Frieza Saga added scenes from the entire Namek story arc as well as a few scenes from the Saiyan Saga. Unfortunately, it didn't add much more; no new gameplay elements were introduced, and the Personality selection was rather questionable (for example, Guldo received a complete 1-3 Levels of Personalities, whereas Frieza only had one). This set also continued a trend of poor card titles though it did seem to clean up on poor image to name connections.

Overall though, unlike other sets in the game, it did seem to completely disregard the show in terms of characters with most of the Ginyu Force and Frieza heavily neglected. Of The Ginyu Force only Guldo, Jeice and Captain Ginyu were printed. Burter and Recoome had to settle for group appearances on the Capsule Corp Power Packs trio of Ginyu Force personality cards. Frieza's second form was released in the card game, though his third form did not. His final form did at least get some show time in the Lost Villains subset, but as it was Level 1 it couldn't be used with "Frieza, the Master". His 100% Full Power form was also released as a redemption Hi-Tech for this set, but again, it was Level 1 and couldn't be used in conjunction with "Frieza, the Master".

The Hi-Tech Redemption cards released for this set were: Frieza, Captain Ginyu, Garlic Jr, Spice, Vinegar & Trunks

Personality cards in this set included Dodoria, Goku, Gohan, Piccolo, Krillin, Yamcha, Tien, Chiaotzu, Yajirobe, Bulma, Chi-Chi, Nail, Dende, Raditz, Nappa, Vegeta, Guldo, Jeice, and Frieza.

==== Trunks saga ====
The Trunks Saga expansion was an amalgam of more scenes from the Frieza Saga, as well as the Garlic Jr. Saga and Trunks Saga. One of the more popular Personalities, Future Trunks made his expansion debut here (he had previously been released as a Promo card). Also, Vegeta, previously a Villain, started being printed as a hero. Other than the change of wording on the cards, the Trunks Saga saw the debut of Mastery cards that could be used to stylize decks, as well as the introduction of the Nameakian-style build for Piccolo and the Nail personality cards found in the Frieza saga. Personality cards in this set included Goku, Gohan, Piccolo, Krillin, Trunks, Vegeta, Jeice, Frieza, Dodoria, Captain Ginyu, Garlic Jr., King Cold, Spice, and Vinegar.

Ultra rares in this set were "Where There's Life There's Hope", "Villain's True Power", "King Cold" level 4 and "Goku" level 4.

==== Androids saga ====
The Dragon Ball Z Trading Card Game's second Booster Pack-only expansion. This set is widely considered to be the best produced by Score, by many casual fans and tournament players. The set also included certain cards, marked with a burning kanji, that represented scenes from Future Trunks' timeline.

Ultra Rare cards printed in this set were "The Hero Is Down" and "Trunks Guardian Drill".

==== Cell saga ====
With the introduction of the villain Cell came the first Stage 5 Personality cards, which would remain the highest level until the Shadow Dragon Saga of Dragon Ball GT. Personality cards in this set included Goku, Gohan, Piccolo, Krillin, Yamcha, Tien, Bulma, Chi-Chi, Trunks, Vegeta, Android 16, Android 17, Android 18, Android 19, and Android 20, and Cell.

The 200-card Cell Saga was released in 12-card booster packs in December 2001, as well as Hero and Villain Starter Decks. There were also six preview cards and ten promotional cards not included in the booster packs.

The 6-star Ultra Rare cards printed in this set were "Goku, Level 5", "Vegeta, Level 5", "Cell's Presence", and "Z-Warriors Gather".

==== Cell Games saga ====
Nothing new was really brought in with the Cell Games Saga (Endurance game mechanic was introduced in Cell Games) though it continued to add the brand new Level 5 cards, this time in the form of the Ultra Rares for Trunks and Piccolo. It also introduced the Cell Jrs, which were treated a lot like the Saibaimen, though there were only 3 cards to choose from with two different Level 1 Cell Jrs and a Level 2 Cell Jr.

Whilst not released in the same way as future subsets, the 22 Tuff Enuff cards were still considered to be the Cell Games Saga subset.

The 6-star Ultra Rare cards printed in this set were "Trunks, the Battler (level 5)" and "Piccolo, the Defender (level 5)"

Personality cards in this set included Trunks, Piccolo, Dende, Chiaotzu and Cell Jr.

==== World Games saga ====
The Celestial Fighters mechanic was exclusive to the World Games Saga, and not carried over to any other expansion. World Games also introduced the "Sensei cards", which proved to be the second most popular card type among many players, next to Personalities. Despite the introduction of Sensei cards and Freestyle Mastery, this expansion was highly chastized for its lack of Villain cards outside of Majin Spopovich and the Celestial Fighters. It also introduced "color-shifting," styled cards that went against the traditional strengths of their style. This was not well-taken by players.

The World Games Saga was released in Booster Packs, as well as Hero and Celestial Fighter Starter Decks. Personality cards in this set included Goku, Gohan, Goten, Piccolo, Krillin, Vegeta, Kid Trunks, Grand Kai, Videl, Olibu, Arqua, Chapuchai, Froug, Maraikoh, Tapkar, Torbie, Pikkon, and Majin Spopovich. Sensei cards in this set included East Kai, North Kai, West Kai, and South Kai.

==== Babidi saga ====
Another Booster only set, Babidi Saga expanded upon the Majin mechanic. Although it had been introduced in the World Games Saga, Majin Spopovich and Rare preview card of Majin Vegeta were the only Personalities that could take advantage of it. The Majin mechanic was praised by some fans, and looked down upon by others. Majin Personalities were only able to have other Majin Personalities as Allies; thus, by the end of the Dragon Ball CCG, if one was playing a Hero deck with Majin Personalities, they only had Majin Vegeta, Majin Dabura, and "fat" Majin Buu to choose from. This mechanic was discarded when Dragon Ball GT was released, with the exception of playing in Expanded format. On an entertainment scale, like the Cell Game and World Games sagas, quotes and character head-shots were limited almost solely to Non-Combat Cards and were few and far between.

The Personality cards in this set included Goku, Gohan, Android 18, Hercule, Videl, Supreme Kai, Majin Babidi, Majin Dabura, Majin Pui-Pui, Majin Yakon, and Majin Vegeta.

The 6-star Ultra Rare cards printed in this set were "Majin Vegeta, Level 1" and "Majin Vegeta, the Malevolent, Level 5".

==== Buu saga ====
Buu Saga introduced the concept of Alternate Dragon Balls (Dende, in this expansion), which were played exactly like the originals, but with different effects. Also introduced was Fusion, which allowed players to remove two specific Personalities from play in order to play a much more powerful Personality. A new kind of high-tech card was introduced for the personalities, called "gate-fold." It would have a normal card face on the outside, and then open up for a new card on the inside. Finally, the introduction of a Bee Personality card broke the Majin-only Allies rule, allowing him to be an Ally to Majin Buu. This was the final Starter Deck set released for the DBZ CCG. It introduced the only booster pack "Uber Rares", though their rarity was such that they seemed easier to get than the Ultra Rares.

The Buu Saga was released in Booster Packs, as well as Hero and Villain Starter Decks. Personality cards in this set included Goku, Gohan, Goten, Kid Trunks, Piccolo, Krillin, Dende, Hercule, Oolong, Bee, Korin, Gotenks, Majin Babidi, Majin Dabura, Majin Vegeta, and Majin Buu. Sensei cards in this set included Master Roshi and Elder Kai.

The 6-star Ultra Rare cards printed in this set are "Goku, Super Saiyan 3, Level 5", "Eternal Dragon's Quest", "Majin Buu, Level 5", and "Master Roshi Sensei".

The 7-star Uber Rare cards printed in this set are "Gotenks, Level 1" and "Gotenks, Super Saiyan, Level 2"

==== Fusion saga ====
Fusion Saga, as the name implies, expanded on the Fusion gameplay mechanic, adding three brand-new Fusion Personalities, as well as a Stage 3 Personality for Gotenks. The set didn't revolve completely around the Fusions, however, as it also gave Majin Buu and Gohan some very powerful Personality cards. It also gave cards that block all of certain attack types under certain conditions to each style, drastically improving the defensive capabilities.

The Personality cards in this set included Gohan, Yamcha, Gotenks. Vegito, Hercule-Goku, Den-Goku, Majin Buu, and Majin Buu's Kamikaze Ghost.

The 6-star Ultra Rare cards printed in this set are fusion-card personalities "Gotenks, Super Saiyan 3, Level 3", and "Vegito, Level 2".

==== Kid Buu saga ====
The final set in the Dragon Ball Z Collectible Card Game. Buu is given several more powerful Personalities in the form as Kid Buu, as well as a Personality for Buu's creator, Bibidi. Also in the set are cards with scenes and characters that take place at the 28th Tenka-ichi Budokai, which serves as the epilogue to the series. There was not a Kid Buu level 1 personality, as Score felt that there were enough Buu personalities already. They decided against making this set a Base set, and chose it as an Expansion instead, primarily due to the card series ending (before moving to GT), and the lack of significant personalities available to be used as MPs.

The Kid Buu saga saw very little to no play during the regional season due to the quick release of GT. The Kid Buu saga set was one of the most thoroughly playtested sets in the history of the game, being tested by many of the game's notable players. It has been surmised that there were over 15 top tier decks when Kid Buu was released.

The 6-star Ultra Rare cards printed in this set are "Piccolo Sensei" and "Earth's Spirit Bomb".

It also included an all-foil 36 card Bojack Unbound sub-set, and all 4 levels of Broly within the booster set, though tricky to get with an average of no more than 3 or 4 Bojack Unbound cards found in each 24 pack booster box. The Broly cards were even harder to find.

The Personality cards in this set included Gohan, Bulma, Chi-Chi, Android 18, Vegeta, Kid Trunks, Yamcha, Yajirobe, Hercule, Videl, Majin Dabura, Uub, King Kai, Pan, Kid Buu, and Majin Bibidi. Sensei cards in this set included Goku and Piccolo.

=== Dragon Ball GT Collectible Card Game ===
With the introduction of cards based on Dragon Ball Z's sequel series, some gameplay mechanics changed, most of which to suit the more powerful characters from the anime. The Personality cards were given more power stages, and High Tech Personalities were, for the first time, customizable. Some cards, while still playable normally, could also be used as a "Backer" card, which could be placed behind a High Tech Personality to change its Personality power, Power-Up Rating, and/or power stages. Also, nearly every non-Personality card had an Endurance rating, allowing them to "absorb" life cards of damage from attacks.

==== Baby saga ====
The first Dragon Ball "Black Star Dragon Ball Saga"/"Lost Episodes". Unlike the previous expansions (the DBZ TCG), there is only one Starter Deck type, which randomly has one of eight Starter Deck personalities. Although Namekian Style cards were altogether dropped, each Style was presented with two Mastery cards in this set. Also, for the first time, the Oozaru were represented with Personality cards.

The Baby Saga was released in Booster Packs, as well as Starter Decks. Personality cards in this set included Goku, Chi-Chi, Gohan, Goten, Vegeta, Bulma, Trunks, Bulla, Majin Buu, Elder Kai, Kabito Kai, Hercule, Videl, Pan, Giru, Uub/Majuub, Sugoro, Shusugoro, Baby, Dr. Myuu, Emperor Pilaf, Mai, Shu, General Rilldo, Mutant Robot, Sigma Force, Baby Gohan, Baby Goten, and Baby Vegeta.

==== Super 17 saga ====
The first Booster Pack-only expansion for GT did not add any significant changes to the gameplay mechanics, but reintroduced some fan-favorite characters as Personalities, such as Piccolo and Android 18.

Personality cards in this set included Goku, Chi-Chi, Goten, Vegeta, Bulma, Trunks, Bulla, Piccolo, Android 18, Maron, Dende, Majuub, Videl, Pan, Super Android 17, Android 17, Android 20, Frieza, Cell, Dr. Myuu, and General Rilldo.

==== Shadow Dragon saga ====
The second and final set of Dragon Ball GT to incorporate a Starter Deck, Shadow Dragons introduced new concepts to the game; Masked, Ability, Augment, and Shift. Shadow Dragons also reintroduced Sensei cards, which had not been seen since Kid Buu Saga. Also, many cards portraying events of the past were marked as "Flashback" cards. Perhaps the largest addition that was seen in this expansion, was the Stage 6 Personality card. The only two of these, Goku and Omega Shenron, were released in this set. Fusion also returned, with Super Saiyan 4 Gogeta.

The Shadow Dragon Saga was released in Booster Packs, as well as Starter Decks. Personality cards in this set included Goku, Chi-Chi, Gohan, Goten, Vegeta, Bulma, Trunks, Gogeta, Elder Kai, Kabito Kai, Hercule, Pan, Giru, Majuub, Omega Shenron, Nuova Shenron, Naturon Shenron, Eis Shenron, Rage Shenron, Haze Shenron, and Oceanus Shenron. Sensei cards in this set included Black Smoke Dragon, Giru, Kabito Kai, Vegeta, Eternal Dragon, Omega Shenron.

==== Lost Episodes saga ====
Using the scenes from the first sixteen episodes of Dragon Ball GT (known more commonly as the "Black Star Dragon Balls" Saga), Lost Episodes continue the gameplay changes added in Shadow Dragons. Lost Episodes also introduced a new method of winning the game; attaching three Wanted Poster cards to their corresponding Personalities (Goku, Pan, and Trunks), and playing the card "Captured!", allowed the player to win. Score planned a fifth GT expansion after Lost Episodes (as seen by the preview cards inserted into the Lost Episodes Boosters), called "Anthology", which would encompass the Dragon Ball GT series in its entirety. However, this set was never released and Lost Episode stocks were seemingly cut short. This made them hard to get with Ultra Rares such as Lv5 Pan, Lv5 Trunks and Bulma Sensei becoming considerably rarer than Z cards such as Goku, Super Saiyan 3 and Majin Vegeta, the Malevolent. Some Lost Episodes packs also had bonus "Skannerz" cards.

Personality cards in this set included Goku, Pan, Trunks, Giru, Dr. Myuu, Dolltaki, Bon Para Para, Son Para Para, Don Para Para, Emperor Pilaf, Mai, General Rilldo, Luud, Ledgic, Cardinal Mutchy Mutchy, Mutchy, and Zoonama. Sensei cards in this set included Bulma and King Kai,

=== Dragon Ball Z Trading Card Game ===
Changing most of the rules established in previous incarnations of the card game, Dragon Ball Z Trading Card Game's changes were simultaneously praised by longtime fans who thought the mechanics were becoming stale, as well as criticized by those who wanted the game to continue the current format.

One major change to the Personality cards (other than the fact that their power stages are, on the whole, the weakest of any expansion), they are split into "Main" and "Ally" Personality cards, whereas with the previous expansions, any Personality could be played as either. The Stage numbers on the cards have different effects, as a player may have only one Personality of a Character in their deck, and all of the levels of each of the players' Personalities must add up to three or less. Heroes and Villains are no longer divided into alignment.

Also, a large change to Personalities, are the "Traits" printed on each card. Traits group a character by species, such as Krillin being a Human, Goku being a Saiyan, or Frieza listed as an Alien. If a character is a half-breed, such as Gohan being half-Human, half-Saiyan, they are designated so.

Also of note, is that the sets are named after the DVDs of the original American dub release.

==== Arrival ====
Arrival was said to be known by a number of different names during development, including Saiyan Saga Redux, Saiyan Saga Redo, Vegeta Saga, Saiyan Saga II, and Dragon Ball Reborn. Whether these names were used internally by Score, or just by fans, remains uncertain. Arrival takes place within the Saiyan/Vegeta Saga, although some of the card images come from later in the series (compare a few of Vegeta and Yamcha's Personalities, which have their Androids Saga looks, for example).

Arrival was released in Booster Packs, as well as Starter Decks. Personality cards in this set included Chiaotzu, Gohan, Goku, Krillin, Nappa, Piccolo, Raditz, Saibaimen, Tien, Vegeta, and Yamcha.

==== Showdown ====
The first Booster Pack-only set of the DBZ TCG, Showdown mixed scenes from the Saiyan Saga/Vegeta Saga, as well as those from the Namek/Ginyu/Frieza Sagas. The main concentration of this expansion was the Namek saga, in which Vegeta battles against Zarbon and Dodoria.

Personality cards in this set included Zarbon, Dodoria, Frieza, Gohan, Goku, Krillin, Launch, Vegeta, and Bulma.

==== Transformation ====
Transformation was released Spring of 2006, and is the last expansion set for the DragonBall Z Trading Card Game. Transformation contains mostly cards with scenes from the Namek/Ginyu/Frieza Sagas. The main concentration of this expansion was the battles between the Ginyu Force and the Earthlings, who team up with Vegeta, and the long battle between Frieza and Goku.

Personality cards in this set included Burter, Guldo, Jeice, Recoome, Captain Ginyu, Frieza, Krillin, Gohan, Nail, Piccolo, Vegeta, Dende, and Goku.

==== Revelation ====
Due to player demand, Score Entertainment decided to release the last proposed expansion set in virtual card format, to be play-legal during the 2006 Grand Kai Invitational. Players were able to print these cards out, via PDF files found on the main website, and use the printouts as cards in their deck.

== Subsets ==
Starting with "Lost Villains" and "Puppet Show" in the World Games Saga, Subsets have become an integral part of the card game. Strangely enough, the Dragon Ball GT Collectible Card Game only showcased one Subset, and there have been none to date in the Dragon Ball Z Collectible Card Game. The Subsets' main drawing point was that they showcased characters from the movies, or ones that had not been seen in a set for some time.

=== Lost Villains ===
Featured in World Games saga packs, the Lost Villains was based on the episode of the "Great Saiyaman Saga" where Goku and Pikkon fought against the various villains that were causing trouble in Hell. Personalities in this Subset included Frieza, Jeice, and King Cold. The Sensei card in this Subset was Grand Kai.

=== Puppet Show ===
Featured in World Games saga packs, the "Puppet Show" Subset contained scenes from a mini-movie, shown at the beginning of the 25th Tenka-ichi Budokai that detailed Cell's supposed defeat at the hands of Hercule, using poor acting and Sentai-style costumes. Personalities in this Subset included Cell, Goku, Piccolo, Vegeta, and Hercule. Other characters from this segment of the anime were not shown due to the technical inability to get good headshots.

=== Movie 7 ===
Available in Babadi Saga Packs this subset was Based on the Movie "Super Android 13", Movie 7 also showcased cards that depicted the other Androids from the series. Personalities in this Subset included Android 13/Super Android 13, Android 14, Android 15, Gohan, Trunks, and Goku.

=== Movie 8 ===
Included in Buu saga packs, the cards of the Movie 8 Subset came from the movie "Broly The Legendary Super Saiyan". Broly, the titular villain, received several powerful personality cards, as well as many named cards. As a result, (and because of the popularity the character already displayed), cards related to Broly were highly sought after. Personality cards in this Subset included Broly, Master Roshi, and Paragus.

=== Cosmic Anthology ===
A Subset similar to the Capsule Corps Power Packs, included with Fusion saga packs, Cosmic Anthology showcased cards with scenes from the various Dragon Ball Z sagas, as well as some of the movies. It also reprinted some of the most popular cards from previous sets. Personality cards in this Subset included Zarbon, Caterpy, Dr. Willow, Icarus, Supreme West Kai, and Turles.

=== Bojack Unbound ===
As expected, this Subset is based on the ninth Dragon Ball Z Movie, "Bojack Unbound". Most of the cards are centered on the space pirate Bojack and his henchmen. As noted in the Kid Buu section of the article, this subset was also released in the Kid Buu Booster set.

Personality cards in this Subset included Bido, Bojack, Bujin, Kogu, Trunks, and Zanya.

=== Broly ===
A mini-Subset packaged alongside the Bojack Unbound subset (Kid Buu Saga). The Subset only consisted 4 of Broly Personality cards. This was included for the release of the second Broly movie.

=== Broly: Second Coming ===
Based on the second movie starring Broly, it was released in the "Baby Saga" GT card expansion, but is, for all purposes, considered a Dragon Ball Z Subset. Personality cards in this Subset included Broly and Krillin.

=== Villain Invasion ===
The only Subset printed on Dragon Ball GT card stock, although the images were taken from Dragon Ball Z. The Personalities reflected Villains that had been ultimately been defeated by the Z Senshi. When the name of this Subset was first revealed, players thought that the characters would be those resurrected from Hell in the Super 17 Saga or Movie 12. This was not the case, as characters that were in neither, such as Captain Ginyu, were present in this Subset. The Personality cards in this Subset included Zarbon, Dodoria, Captain Ginyu, King Cold, Majin Yakon, Nappa, and Saibaimen.

=== Tuff Enuff ===
Tuff Enuff cards were actually released in separate packs within the Cell Games Saga, so whilst the cards weren't inserted within Cell Games booster packs it was still counted as a subset. The 22 cards were all foil and printed with the Cell Saga art around the image and card text, with the exception of the symbol which in this case was the Tuff Enuff one. The cards showcased scenes from the Cell Games, with the exception of "Garlic Jr's Energy Blast", "Krillin's Coolness Drill" and the insane "Are You Tuff Enuff" (which had an Endurance of 100 and bestowed 100 anger to all players), these cards showed off earlier scenes. The Flavor Text/Quotes for all cards were simply "Tuff Enuff Only"

=== Dragon Ball Z Collectible Card Game promos ===
Personality cards that were released as promos include Android 16, Android 17, Android 18, Android 19, Android 20, Bardock, Bubbles, Cell, Chi-Chi, Cooler, Frieza, Garlic Jr., Future Gohan, Captain Ginyu, The Ginyu Force, Gohan, Goku, Jewel, Kid Trunks, King Cold, King Kai, Krillin, Lord Slug, Master Roshi, Meta-Cooler, Mighty Mask, Mr. Popo, Nappa, Piccolo, Pikkon, Raditz, Spice, Tien, Trunks, Vegeta, and Vinegar. The only Sensei promo card was Supreme Kai. There was also Grand Kai sensei from world games.

=== Dragon Ball Z Trading Card Game promos ===
Personality cards that were released as promos include Broly/Bio Broly, Frieza, Gohan, Goku, Janemba, Piccolo, Trunks, and Vegeta.

== See also ==
- Dragon Ball Super Card Game
