= Dragon Ball Z season 9 =

Dragon Ball Z
- Season 9
- DVD release poster featuring Vegito
- No. of episodes: 38

Release
- Original network: Fuji Television
- Original release: February 1, 1995 – January 31, 1996

Season chronology
- ← Previous; Season 8 Next → Dragon Ball GT episodes

The ninth and final season of the Dragon Ball Z anime series contains the Fusion, Kid Buu and Peaceful World arcs, which comprises Part 3 of the Buu Saga. It originally ran from February 1995 to January 1996 in Japan on Fuji Television. The first English airing of the series was on Cartoon Network where Funimation Entertainment's dub of the series ran from October 2002 to April 2003.

Funimation released the season in a box set on May 19, 2009, and announced that they would be re-releasing Dragon Ball Z in a new seven volume set called the "Dragon Boxes". Based on the original series masters with frame-by-frame restoration, the first set was released on November 10, 2009.

== Episode list ==
No. overall	Initial dub no.	Translated title/Funimation's dub title Original Japanese title	Directed by	Written by	Animation directed by	Original release date	English air date
254	239	"Run Away, Satan!! An Angry Majin Boo Emerges" / "The Evil of Men"; Transliteration: "Nigero Satan!! Ikari no Majin Bū Shutsugen" (Japanese: 逃げろサタン!!怒りの魔人ブウ出現)	Yoshihiro Ueda	Takao Koyama	Masayuki Uchiyama	February 1, 1995	October 14, 2002 (FUNimation) October 15, 2002 (Ocean)
The two gunmen proceed to shoot rockets at Buu's house. Hercule runs up to the hill they're on and pounds each of them. A calmed Majin Buu is able to heal the dog, and the three friends continue having fun. Majin Buu rebuilds his house to look like the dog, which he names Bee. While Hercule is cooking a meal for Majin Buu, one of the gunmen sneaks into Majin Buu's house and shoots the World Champion. Majin Buu starts to lose control of his rage himself. After he heals Hercule, he instructs him to get away. Majin Buu begins giving off more steam than ever that all of his evil is expelled within him and the steam is congealing in the sky. It forms the evil side of Majin Buu, a tall, thin, gray version of Majin Buu. Evil Buu flies over to the gunman and blasts him into oblivion.
255	240	"Which One Will Win!? A Good-and-Evil Boo-Boo Confrontation" / "Buu Against Buu"; Transliteration: "Dotchi ga Katsu no!? Zen'aku Bū Bū Taiketsu" (Japanese: どっちが勝つの!?善悪ブウブウ対決)	Kazuhito Kikuchi	Hiroshi Toda	Tadayoshi Yamamuro	February 8, 1995	October 15, 2002 (FUNimation) October 16, 2002 (Ocean)
Evil Buu and Good Buu begin to fight, and it's clear that Evil Buu has the advantage. Good Buu becomes desperate and angry and resorts to trying to turn his opponent into chocolate, but Evil Buu deflects the ray back at Good Buu, who becomes a piece of chocolate. Evil Buu consumes the chocolate, and transforms into Super Majin Buu, a bulkier, pink version of Evil Buu. Super Buu blows up the other gunman, and spies another person hiding nearby. He is about to destroy the other person, when he realizes that it's Hercule. He spares his friend, and flies off. He arrives at Dende's lookout.
256	241	"A No-Timeout Catastrophe!! Earth's Humanity Exterminated" / "Empty Planet"; Transliteration: "Matta nashi no Hakyoku!! Chikyū Jinrui Zetsumetsu" (Japanese: 待ったなしの破局!!地球人類絶滅)	Yamauchi Shigeyasu	Hiroshi Toda	Yukio Ebisawa	February 15, 1995	October 16, 2002 (FUNimation) October 17, 2002 (Ocean)
Super Buu demands to fight Gotenks, but Piccolo knows that the boys aren't ready. To buy time, he tells Super Buu that he can spend a day killing the rest of the people on Earth. Super Buu starts walking around the edge of the lookout, and Piccolo uses this time to tell Krillin to wake up the boys and get them into the Hyperbolic Time Chamber to train. Super Buu completes his walk, and raises up his arm. Millions of energy blasts start flying out of his hand down to Earth, and they kill virtually everyone left. After this Human Extinction Attack is finished, only Hercule, the dog Bee, Tien Shin Han, Chiaotzu, and Fortune Teller Baba remain on the surface, as well as the people on the lookout. Piccolo asks for Super Buu to wait for one hour, and Videl agrees. Super Buu complies, because Videl is the daughter of Hercule.
257	242	"The Special Training Is a Success!! You're Finished Now, Majin Boo" / "Time Struggle"; Transliteration: "Tokkun Seikō!! Kore de Owari da Majin Bū" (Japanese: 特訓成功!!これで終りだ魔人ブウ)	Jun'ichi Fujise	Atsushi Maekawa	Shingo Ishikawa	February 22, 1995	October 17, 2002 (FUNimation) October 18, 2002 (Ocean)
Chi Chi slaps Super Buu for she thinks he killed Gohan, and in retaliation, Super Buu turns her into an egg and crushes her. A Goten vows to train as hard as he can for what Super Buu did to his mother. The boys enter the Hyperbolic Time Chamber and begin to train. Super Buu's patience wears off after thirty minutes, and he demands to fight his opponent right now. Piccolo reluctantly agrees to take Super Buu to the Chamber, but he takes the longest route possible, giving the boys as much time as he can. He telepathically warns them that he is bringing Super Buu to them so they can rest up in time. The boys seem to have developed a few new tricks, and they have planned their fight with Super Buu. Finally, Piccolo and Super Buu arrive at the chamber, and Goten and Trunks fuse together.
258	243	"I'm Going Like I Mean It!! A Wide-Open Super Gotenks" / "Super Moves of Gotenks"; Transliteration: "Honki de Iku ze!! Sūpā Gotenkusu Zenkai" (Japanese: 本気で行くぜ!!超ゴテンクス全開)	Takahiro Imamura	Atsushi Maekawa	Yūji Hakamada	March 1, 1995	October 21, 2002 (FUNimation and Ocean)
Super Buu and Gotenks begin to fight, and Gotenks decides to use some of his new special moves. The problem is that these moves, while flashy, are ineffective against Super Buu, not to mention they have ridiculous names, like the "Screaming Angry Wombat". After it is clear that these moves have no effect, Super Gotenks talks strategy with Piccolo. He then creates a ring of energy, the "Galactic Doughnut" and uses it to trap Super Buu. After a brief struggle, Super Buu is able to break the ring. The two then do a bit of real fighting. Super Gotenks decides to use another one of his special moves, called the Super Ghost Kamikaze Attack. He spits out a ghost of himself, and plans to use it against Super Buu.
259	244	"I've Done It!! Boo Successfully Eliminated With Ghosts!?" / "Trapped in Forever"; Transliteration: "Yatta ze!! Obake de Seikō Bū Taiji!?" (Japanese: やったぜ!!オバケで成功ブウ退治!?)	Mitsuo Hashimoto	Reiko Yoshida	Masayuki Uchiyama	March 8, 1995	October 22, 2002 (FUNimation and Ocean)
Super Gotenks creates ten ghosts that detonate with explosive force when they are touched. He sends all but one at Super Buu, and they reduce him to a deformed puddle of his former self. Super Gotenks sends the final one down Super Buu's mouth, blowing him into tiny pieces. Super Gotenks and Piccolo destroy all of the pieces, but the smoke coming from the pieces gathers above their heads and reforms Super Buu. To play up the drama of the situation, Super Gotenks acts like he's out of ideas, and Super Buu begins beating up the fused Super Saiyan. Thinking that Super Gotenks cannot stop Super Buu, Piccolo destroys the door to the outside world, which traps the three of them in the Chamber for all eternity.
260	245	"Escape From Another Dimension!! Super Gotenks 3" / "Feeding Frenzy"; Transliteration: "Ijigen kara no Dasshutsu!! Sūpā Gotenkusu Surī" (Japanese: 異次元からの脱出!!超ゴテンクス3)	Yoshihiro Ueda	Hiroshi Toda	Keisuke Masunaga	March 15, 1995	October 23, 2002 (FUNimation and Ocean)
Hysterically upset at the prospect of being trapped in the Hyperbolic Time Chamber forever, with nothing to destroy and no candy to eat, Super Buu starts to scream of hate. To everyone's surprise including his own, his screams become so powerful that they create a hole in the barrier between the dimensions of the chamber and Earth. Super Buu changes shape in order to fit through it, and the hole closes, leaving Piccolo and Super Gotenks trapped. Back on The Lookout, Super Buu is hungry and excited at the prospect of turning more people into food, and so he turns everyone on the lookout into chocolate. Piccolo and Super Gotenks have been attempting to scream loud enough to create an inter-dimensional hole like Super Buu did, but they have no success. Super Gotenks decides to play his trump card, transforming into a Super Saiyan 3. In this state, he has the power necessary to create a hole for him and Piccolo to jump through. Upon their return to the lookout, Super Buu tells Super Gotenks 3 that he ate all of his friends, and enraged, Super Gotenks 3 promises Buu that he will pay to eat everyone.
261	246	"Going Too Far!? Boo-Boo Volleyball" / "Gotenks is Awesome"; Transliteration: "Norisugi!? Bū Bū Barēbōru" (Japanese: ノリすぎ!?ブウブウバレーボール)	Kazuhito Kikuchi	Hiroshi Toda	Naoaki Hōjō	March 22, 1995	October 24, 2002 (FUNimation and Ocean)
Super Gotenks and Super Buu begin to fight, and the collateral damage from the battle begins to destroy The Lookout. Super Buu slams Super Gotenks 3 down through The Lookout itself. Down on Earth, Super Gotenks 3 tries another Super Ghost Kamikaze attack, but it once again fails. Super Buu lands a powerful hit on Super Gotenks 3 that sends him flying back into The Lookout. Super Buu then folds himself into a ball, and begins repeatedly shooting himself through The Lookout until all that's left is rubble floating in the air. While still in a ball, Super Gotenks 3 is able to trap him in a little sphere. He and Piccolo then play some volleyball with Super Buu, and Super Gotenks 3 spikes him down to Earth. Just when it seems like Super Buu is dead, a powerful blast of energy comes from the crater. With Super Buu once again ready to fight, Super Gotenks 3 only has a few minutes until he separates.
262	247	"Truly 'Great'!! A Reborn Gohan Returns to Earth" / "Unlucky Break"; Transliteration: "Masa ni Gurēto!! Shinsei Gohan Chikyū e" (Japanese: まさにグレート!!新生悟飯地球へ)	Mitsuo Hashimoto	Hiroshi Toda	Yukio Ebisawa	April 26, 1995	October 25, 2002 (Ocean) October 28, 2002 (FUNimation)
Super Gotenks 3 and Super Buu continue their fight. Super Gotenks 3 seems to be wearing Super Buu down, and he now has the upper hand in the fight. Just as he's about to hit Super Buu with his final move, Super Gotenks 3 unexpectedly returns straight to his normal state from his Super Saiyan 3 form. The power was too high for him to sustain. Super Buu begins beating up Gotenks, who is now no match for him. Gohan has finally finished his training, and is ready to return to Earth. After saying goodbye to Goku for what they both believe will be the last time, Kibito takes him back, and Gohan asks him to change his clothes. He's now wearing clothes just like Goku and arrives just in time, because Gotenks has separated.
263	248	"Boo Overwhelmed!! Gohan's Miracle Power" / "A Whole New Gohan"; Transliteration: "Bū o Attō!! Gohan no Mirakuru Pawā" (Japanese: ブウを圧倒!!悟飯のミラクルパワー)	Yoshihiro Ueda	Masashi Kubota	Shingo Ishikawa	May 3, 1995	October 28, 2002 (Ocean) October 29, 2002 (FUNimation)
Gohan arrives at the scene, and everyone is shocked at how much power he has. After Gohan expertly pounds him to a pulp, Super Buu heals himself and steps up the intensity, but Gohan still has the upper hand. He is easily picking Super Buu apart.
264	249	"Has He Done It!? Majin Boo's Great Explosion" / "Search for Survivors"; Transliteration: "Yatta ka!? Majin Bū Daibakuhatsu" (Japanese: やったか!?魔人ブウ大爆発)	Kazuhito Kikuchi	Atsushi Maekawa	Yūji Hakamada	May 17, 1995	October 29, 2002 (Ocean) October 30, 2002 (FUNimation)
Realizing that he's totally outmatched, Super Buu decides to self-destruct, hoping to take Gohan with him. Gohan escapes before Super Buu explodes, and he takes the others with him out of the blast radius. Afterwards, there is no sign of Super Buu, but Gohan knows that he's still around. They suddenly detect Dende's energy signal, and they go to find him. On the way, they pick up Hercule Satan and the dog, Bee. Dende explains that as Super Buu was escaping through the inter-dimensional hole, Mr. Popo threw him from the lookout, because without Dende, there would be no Dragon Balls to grant the wishes they intend to use to reverse all the damage. Super Buu tracks them down, but instead of having a rematch with Gohan, he calls out Goten and Trunks.
265	250	"Boo's Worst Foul! Gotenks is Absorbed!?" / "Majin Buu Transforms"; Transliteration: "Bū Saiaku no Hansoku!! Gotenkusu Kyūshū!?" (Japanese: ブウ最悪の反則!!ゴテンクス吸収!?)	Hidehiko Kadota; Storyboarded by : Yoshihiro Ueda	Atsushi Maekawa	Masayuki Uchiyama	May 24, 1995	October 30, 2002 (Ocean) November 4, 2002 (FUNimation)
Unknown to the others, Super Buu secretly separates two chunks from his back, and the two pink blobs creep around behind the others. As soon as Goten and Trunks fuse, one of the blobs encases Super Gotenks 3. Piccolo, too, has been covered by a pink blob. Super Buu calls each of the blobs back to him, which merge with him, changing his appearance and giving him access to all of Piccolo's and Gotenks memories, abilities and power. The new and improved Super Buu then fights Gohan, and it's clear that Super Buu has the advantage. Gohan is unable to keep up with Super Buu's new speed and strength. Super Buu taunts Gohan by telling him what his three friends that were absorbed think of him.
266	251	"For the Sake of the Entire Universe... Return to Life, Son Goku" / "The Old Kai's Weapon"; Transliteration: "Zen'uchū no Tame ni... Yomigaere Son Gokū" (Japanese: 全宇宙のために…よみがえれ孫悟空)	Mitsuo Hashimoto	Sumio Uetake	Keisuke Masunaga	May 31, 1995	October 31, 2002 (Ocean) November 5, 2002 (FUNimation)
Gohan is no match for the new Super Buu. Super Buu now possesses new skills, such as the Super Ghost Kamikaze Attack and the Special Beam Cannon, each of which he uses on Gohan. He is about to finish Gohan, when Bee comes running up. Hercule tries to save Bee, but is only several times stronger than the average human - nothing compared to Buu. Super Buu is about to blast each of them when Gohan saves them. Super Buu then uses Gotenks' Galactic Doughnut trick on Gohan, and aims a Kamehameha wave at him, but Gohan is able to summon enough strength to break free and move out of the way in time. Meanwhile, in Other World, King Yemma decides to send Vegeta back to earth to help in the fight against Majin Buu. On the world of the Kais, Old Kai decides to give his life to Goku so he can return to Earth and fight Super Buu. The now deceased Old Kai gives Goku his earrings. He explains to Goku that if he and another person each wear one, they will fuse together.
267	252	"The Miracle Happens Once... Will the Super Combination With Gohan Come About?" / "Ready to Fuse?"; Transliteration: "Kiseki wa Ichido... Naru ka Gohan to no Chōgattai" (Japanese: 奇跡は一度…なるか悟飯との超合体)	Yoshihiro Ueda	Hiroshi Toda	Naoaki Hōjō	June 7, 1995	November 1, 2002 (Ocean) November 6, 2002 (FUNimation)
Old Kai tells Supreme Kai and Kibito to try a fusion with their earrings, but only after they fuse together does he reveal that it is a permanent fusion. Dende heals Gohan's injuries, so to prevent this from happening again, Super Buu creates a giant energy ball and aims it at Dende. Just before it hits, it is deflected by Tien Shin Han's Tri-Beam attack, who has decided to help, even though he is terribly outclassed. Super Buu tries again, but Goku suddenly appears and sends a disk of energy at the monster. It cuts off his legs and part of his head. His legs deal Tien a crushing kick which completely incapacitates him and then they return to Super Buu. Desperate to stop Super Buu, Goku throws Gohan the other earring, but his aim is off and the earring is lost in the rubble. Goku goes Super Saiyan 3 in an attempt to hold Super Buu off while Gohan searches for the earring. Inside Super Buu, Gotenks' fusion wears off, splitting back into Trunks and Goten, causing Buu to lose well over a third of his power and his appearance to change. Realizing what's happened, Goku declares he can now defeat Super Buu without fusing with Gohan and prepares to fight. Knowing he needs a massive power increase, Super Buu causes the part of his head that was cut off earlier to suddenly engulf Gohan, just like Piccolo and Gotenks. He reabsorbs the blob containing Gohan, and is now even more powerful than he was with Gotenks absorbed.
268	253	"Merged!! Vegeta's Pride and Goku's Rage" / "Union of Rivals"; Transliteration: "Gattai!! Bejīta no Hokori to Gokū no Ikari" (Japanese: 合体!!ベジータの誇りと悟空の怒り)	Osamu Kasai	Hiroshi Toda	Kazuya Hisada	June 28, 1995	November 4, 2002 (Ocean) November 7, 2002 (FUNimation)
Now back in control, Super Buu toys with Goku, telling him he has some time to find someone to fuse with. He considers fusions with Dende and Hercule, but neither of them are appealing possibilities. He suddenly senses that Vegeta has returned, and uses Instant Transmission to teleport to his location. While Super Buu is distracted, Dende heals Tien. After Goku finds Vegeta, Goku tries to convince him to fuse, but Vegeta is angry at Goku because he knows Goku was holding back his Super Saiyan 3 transformation when they fought. With Vegeta refusing to cooperate, they are forced to take on Super Buu as individuals, but are clearly outclassed. Goku tells Vegeta that Super Buu absorbed Trunks and killed Bulma and asks him to put their differences aside to save their people. Vegeta finally agrees, and only when he puts the earring on does Goku mention that the fusion is permanent. The two last surviving Saiyans fuse and a new being is created.
269	254	"Magnificent Power!! Vegetto Surpasses the Ultimate" / "Meet Vegito"; Transliteration: "Sōzetsu Pawā!! Kyūkyoku o Koeru Bejitto" (Japanese: 壮絶パワー!!究極を越えるベジット)	Kazuhito Kikuchi	Masashi Kubota	Masayuki Uchiyama	July 5, 1995	November 5, 2002 (Ocean) November 8, 2002 (FUNimation)
The new being names himself Vegito, and begins to fight Super Buu. He clearly is far superior to even the new Super Buu. In Other World, Bulma, Videl, Chi Chi, and even Dabura are looking for Gohan, whom they mostly believe to be dead. When Dabura arrived at the Check-in Station, he resisted the guards attempts to subdue his aggressive behaviour, and knowing Dabura would enjoy being sent to hell, King Yemma turned him good. Back on Earth, Dende and Hercule arrive at the battle scene, just as Super Buu has decided to destroy the Earth. He creates a massive ball of energy, and throws it towards the Earth. Vegito easily catches it, and deflects it back out into space. Super Buu claims that he has yet to fight at his full power. Vegito says the same, and powers up to a Super Saiyan.
270	255	"A Fissure Between Dimensions!! Has Boo Snapped!?" / "Rip in the Universe"; Transliteration: "Jigen ni Kiretsu!! Bū ga Kirechatta!?" (Japanese: 次元に亀裂!!ブウがキレちゃった!?)	Yoshihiro Ueda	Masashi Kubota	Yukio Ebisawa	July 12, 1995	November 6, 2002 (Ocean) November 11, 2002 (FUNimation)
Now calling himself Super Vegito, he continues to thrash Super Buu. Super Buu tries to hide himself with his own steam to gain the advantage, but Super Vegito continues to batter him. On the Grand Kai's planet, Krillin and Yamcha are training with King Kai. Back on earth, Super Buu is starting to become desperate. He liquefies himself, and shoots down Super Vegito's mouth, entering his body and turning him into what looks like a super-muscular version of himself. While inside Super Vegito, Super Buu takes control of his body and boasts that he will use him to destroy him from the inside, but Super Vegito uses his energy to isolate all of Super Buu into one spot and pound him. Super Buu moves around but Super Vegito simply continues to pound him. Super Buu is forced to exit Super Vegito's body. Realizing he doesn't know how he can save himself, Super Buu begins to freak out, and the immense amount of energy he releases into his surroundings threatens to tear apart the universe itself. Realizing this, Super Vegito tries to stop him, but Super Buu has put up a shield around himself. After a long struggle, Super Vegito breaks through the shield and stops Super Buu.
271	256	"The Ace Up Boo's Sleeve!! You Become a Hard Candy!" / "Vegito...Downsized"; Transliteration: "Bū no Oku no Te!! Amedama ni Natchae" (Japanese: ブウの奥の手!!アメ玉になっちゃえ)	Kazuhito Kikuchi	Masashi Kubota	Shingo Ishikawa	July 19, 1995	November 7, 2002 (Ocean) November 12, 2002 (FUNimation)
Super Vegito and Super Buu continue to fight, and Super Vegito is still far more powerful than his opponent. He repeatedly dominates Super Buu, which makes Super Buu angrier and angrier. Super Vegito is just toying with him. Super Buu hatches a plan, and calls Super Vegito out. Super Vegito comes closer, and Super Buu turns him into candy. Meanwhile in the Other World, Videl, Bulma, Chi Chi, and Dabura continue their search for Gohan. Videl still doesn't believe that Gohan is dead.
272	257	"A Hero Lost!? Vegetto is Absorbed" / "The Incredible Fighting Candy"; Transliteration: "Hīrō Sōshitsu!? Kyūshūsareta Bejitto" (Japanese: ヒーロー喪失!?吸収されたベジット)	Yamauchi Shigeyasu	Masashi Kubota	Yūji Hakamada	July 26, 1995	November 8, 2002 (Ocean) November 13, 2002 (FUNimation)
As Super Buu celebrates his apparent victory, the Super Vegito candy unexpectedly begins to move and attack Super Buu. It turns out that Super Vegito is somehow still in full control of his new, candy body, and that he is just as powerful as he was before, and can even still talk! (Albeit in a higher pitch). The candy Super Vegito is just as fast as Super Saiyan, and due to its tiny size, is impossible for Super Buu to hit. Infuriated at being toyed with by a piece of candy, Buu changes it back to normal, who then continues to beat him up. Super Vegito literally starts tearing Super Buu apart. He gives Super Buu until the count of ten until he destroys him, and during this countdown, Super Buu notices a part of himself that Super Vegito tore off down on the ground. This part rises up behind Super Vegito, and before Super Vegito reaches ten, he is engulfed by the pink blob. Super Buu calls the blob back to him and absorbs it.
273	258	"A Demonic Maze!! What Is There Inside Boo's Belly!?" / "The Innards of Buu"; Transliteration: "Ma no Meikyū!! Bū no Onaka ni Nani ga Aru!?" (Japanese: 魔の迷宮!!ブウの腹（おなか）に何がある!?)	Yoshihiro Ueda	Masashi Kubota	Masayuki Uchiyama	August 2, 1995	November 11, 2002 (Ocean) November 14, 2002 (FUNimation)
After absorbing Super Vegito, Super Buu notices that he has not taken on any of his characteristics. He guesses this is because he hasn't digested Super Vegito yet. Inside Super Buu, Super Vegito still exists intact, and separate from Super Buu. It turns out that Super Vegito had planned this, putting up a barrier during the absorption, and letting himself be shrunk by Super Buu's magic absorption process, but not incorporated into his being. Once he dispels the barrier, Super Vegito unexpectedly splits back into Goku and Vegeta. Taking advantage of this unexpected event, Vegeta crushes his fusion earring, not wanting to give up his independence from Goku by permanently fusing with him. He cites that once they free their absorbed friends, Buu will lose most of his power and they won't need to be fused to defeat him. As they journey through his innards, they encounter tiny green pieces of slime The slime starts to attack, and it completely covers Goku, electrocuting and paralyzing him. Suddenly, a giant worm appears, ready to eat Goku.
274	259	"Nightmares or Illusions!? Goku and Gohan's Father-Son Confrontation" / "Mind Trap"; Transliteration: "Akumu ka Maboroshi ka!? Gokū to Gohan no Oyako Taiketsu" (Japanese: 悪夢か幻か!?悟空と悟飯の親子対決)	Kazuhito Kikuchi	Atsushi Maekawa	Keisuke Masunaga	August 9, 1995	November 12, 2002 (Ocean) November 15, 2002 (FUNimation)
Goku shakes off the slime, and blasts the worm, injuring it. The worms brother then shows up, and comically calls for their father, but instead of eating Goku, the father yells at his mischievous sons. Goku and the daddy worm exchange pleasantries, while Vegeta feels comically sick due to the worms. The worms point them in the right direction, but due to the damage Goku and Vegeta have caused inside Super Buu, Super Buu experiences great discomfort, and decides to evacuate his bowels. Super Buu creates a toilet in the middle of nowhere, and comically stinks out the surrounding area, including Dende and Hercule Satan. Goku, Vegeta and the worms are caught up a surge of liquid rushing through Super Buu's innards, and the worms declare it's "potty time!" A horrified Vegeta refuses to be expelled from Super Buu's body in such a way. He blasts a hole through the wall of whatever fluid tube they are sliding down and flies up through it, with Goku following. After a long journey, they finally arrive in Super Buu's head, where they encounter what appear to be Piccolo, Gohan, and Gotenks. These three begin attacking Goku and Vegeta, and even though Goku and Vegeta manage to defeat their mysterious attacks, they just get back up again and continue fighting. It seems Goku and Vegeta cannot win, but when Super Buu goes to a bakery and begins to eat some cake, the unstoppable opponents turn into desserts. They were just Super Buu's thoughts. Goku and Vegeta finally find them, who are trapped in cocoons, unconscious, but alive.
275	260	"A Majin's Secret!! Two More Boos Inside of Boo" / "Deadly Vision"; Transliteration: "Majin no Himitsu!! Bū no Naka ni Futari no Bū" (Japanese: 魔人の秘密!!ブウの中に2人のブウ)	Yamauchi Shigeyasu	Atsushi Maekawa	Yukio Ebisawa	August 16, 1995	November 13, 2002 (Ocean) November 18, 2002 (FUNimation)
Goku and Vegeta cut down the cocoons, and as they do, Super Buu regresses to his normal form. Dende and Hercule continue to follow Buu. Back inside Super Buu, Goku and Vegeta also find the Fat Majin Buu. They read his thoughts to find out what happened to him. Suddenly, a thought form of Super Buu himself appears. The two join forces to defeat it, but once they do, another one appears. They realize that this is a battle they cannot win. Super Buu finally decides that he's had enough, and he tries to absorb Goku and Vegeta.
276	261	"Where Is the Exit!? Escape from a Collapsing Boo" / "Evil Kid Buu!"; Transliteration: "Deguchi wa Doko Da!? Kuzureru Bū kara Dasshutsu" (Japanese: 出口はどこだ!?崩れるブウから脱出)	Kazuhito Kikuchi	Atsushi Maekawa	Shingo Ishikawa	August 23, 1995	November 19, 2002 (FUNimation) February 7, 2003 (Ocean)
Goku saves Vegeta from being absorbed. As Vegeta recovers, Goku continues to fight the thought form of Super Buu. Goku is rapidly losing energy, and just as Super Buu is about to defeat Goku, Vegeta cuts down the pod containing the Fat Buu. This causes Super Buu to go mad, as without the Fat Buu absorbed, Super Buu cannot exist. As Super Buu's insides begin to change, Goku and Vegeta realize they must leave, and so they grab the pods containing Gohan, Goten, Piccolo and Trunks and try to find a way out. On their way through his body, they notice one of the tunnels that leads to one of the holes in Super Buu's skin where the steam escapes. They are able to fly out through here, and when they emerge on the other side, all six of them regain their normal size. As Goku and Vegeta set the pods down, they observe Super Buu changing into a different being. He first transforms into a Hulking Majin Buu, and then shrinks into Kid Majin Buu, a childlike version of himself.
277	262	"Earth Disappears!! Boo's Reverse-Transformation of Evil" / "End of Earth"; Transliteration: "Chikyū Shōmetsu!! Bū Jaaku e no Gyakuhenshin" (Japanese: 地球消滅!!ブウ邪悪への逆変身)	Yoshihiro Ueda	Atsushi Maekawa	Yūji Hakamada	September 6, 1995	February 10, 2003 (Ocean) March 17, 2003 (FUNimation)
Supreme Kai explains to Old Kai that he was once one of five Supreme Kais. He was one of the four that each ruled over a quadrant of the universe and the fifth was their leader. He says that this Majin Buu's childlike version is the Majin Buu's original form and by far the most powerful and dangerous of them all. Supreme North and West Kai perished against him. Supreme South Kai was absorbed, changing the Original Majin Buu into the Hulking Majin Buu that was seen briefly in the previous episode. The leader, Dai Kaio, was then absorbed by that form, but this absorption changed Hulking Buu into the fat and happy Majin Buu form that came out of the ball. This absorption of the Kais actually weakened Buu, making him less focused and less destructive. Back on Earth, Kid Buu creates a most powerful ball of energy and throws it at the Earth, intending to destroy it. Goku and Vegeta deflect it. In retaliation, Kid Buu then a creates a ball ten times more powerful than the previous one and throws that. Knowing that they currently do not have enough strength left to stop it, Goku and Vegeta try to grab everyone and teleport away, but are only able to grab Dende, Hercule and Bee. As the Earth is about to be destroyed, Supreme Kai appears and instantly transmits Goku, Vegeta, Dende, Hercule, and Bee to the world of the Kais.
278	263	"Buu's Assault!! A Conclusion in the Kaioshin Realm" / "True Saiyans Fight Alone"; Transliteration: "Bū Raishū!! Kaiōshinkai de Ketchaku da" (Japanese: ブウ来襲!!界王神界で決着だ)	Osamu Kasai	Hiroshi Toda	Masayuki Uchiyama	September 13, 1995	February 11, 2003 (Ocean) March 18, 2003 (FUNimation)
Kid Buu is blasted apart by the explosion but he reforms after the destruction of the Earth, and goes on a rampage throughout the galaxy. He goes from planet to planet, looking for Goku and Vegeta, and then destroys each planet when he doesn't find them. He goes to the Grand Kai's planet, and starts to toy with everyone there. When he becomes bored, he creates an energy ball, intending to destroy the Grand Kai's planet. Supreme Kai offers Goku and Vegeta his fusion earrings, but they both refuse them. They raise their power levels so Kid Buu will know where to find them. Kid Buu abandons his attempt to destroy the Grand Kai's planet and teleports to the world of the Kais.
279	264	"Seize the Future!! A Decisive Battle with the Universe at Stake" / "Battle for the Universe Begins"; Transliteration: "Mirai o Tsukame!! Uchū o Kaketa Daikessen" (Japanese: 未来をつかめ!!宇宙をかけた大決戦)	Yamauchi Shigeyasu	Hiroshi Toda	Keisuke Masunaga	September 20, 1995	February 12, 2003 (Ocean) March 19, 2003 (FUNimation)
The Supreme Kai transports himself, Dende, and Old Kai to a distant planet so they will be out of Goku and Vegeta's way, along with a crystal ball that allows them to watch the battle. Unfortunately, they forget to take Hercule and Bee along. Goku and Vegeta play rock, paper, scissors to decide who will fight first, and Goku wins. He powers up to Super Saiyan 2, and starts beating up Kid Buu. He blasts him apart, but he reforms. Kid Buu creates another massive energy ball and throws it down at the planet. Goku is able to deflect it, but Buu guides the ball back around and into the planet. Powerful shock waves rock the entire planet, disfiguring its shape and leaving the surface ragged and uneven. Goku decides to power up to Super Saiyan 3.
280	265	"Vegeta Takes Off His Hat!! Goku, You Are No. 1" / "Vegeta's Respect"; Transliteration: "Bejīta Datsubō!! Gokū Omae ga Nanbā Wan da" (Japanese: ベジータ脱帽!!悟空おまえがNo.1だ)	Kazuhito Kikuchi	Hiroshi Toda	Naoki Miyahara	October 18, 1995	February 13, 2003 (Ocean) March 20, 2003 (FUNimation)
Goku and Kid Buu continue to fight, each taking powerful blows from each other. Kid Buu folds himself into a ball again, and hits Goku hard. Goku puts all of his energy into a massive Kamehameha, but Kid Buu just reforms afterward. Goku returns to his normal state, collapsing from exhaustion. Vegeta then steps in, but finds he is no match for Kid Buu. Kid Buu cleans his clock, and just as he's about to deal Vegeta the finishing blow, Goku pushes him out of the way. He then powers back up to Super Saiyan 3 and continues their furious fight. Vegeta reminisces about all of the fights he and Goku were in. He finally admits to himself that Goku is better because he is the No.1.
281	266	"Pull Through, Vegeta!! One Life-Threatening Minute" / "Minute of Desperation"; Transliteration: "Taenuke Bejīta!! Inochigake no Ippunkan" (Japanese: 耐え抜けベジータ!!命がけの1分間)	Yoshihiro Ueda	Masashi Kubota	Kazuya Hisada	November 1, 1995	February 14, 2003 (Ocean) March 21, 2003 (FUNimation)
Goku continues to fight Kid Buu, and he seems to have the upper hand. He deals out a lot of damage to Kid Buu, but as the fight goes on, his hits become weaker and weaker until they have virtually no effect at all. He tells Vegeta that it's his turn, but Vegeta declines, deciding that he is no match for Kid Buu. He tells Goku that Kid Buu is too powerful for him and that Goku stands a much better chance of destroying him. Goku is shocked and unsettled by this admission, telling Vegeta that he deliberately let the fight drag on so that Vegeta could have a turn, and now he is exhausted. Vegeta is horrified by this, because now they cannot stop Kid Buu. Goku unsuccessfully attempts to reassure Vegeta, telling him that he needs one uninterrupted minute to power up enough to destroy Kid Buu. Despite the fact that Vegeta recognizes that he will need a miracle to survive a minute against Kid Buu now, he reluctantly steps in while Goku is powering up, even though Goku tells him that if he is destroyed when he is already dead, Vegeta will no longer exist in any form. Kid Buu thrashes Vegeta, but every time he gets knocked down, Vegeta gets up, ready for more. Kid Buu stretches out his arm, wraps it around Vegeta's neck, and begins choking him for fun. It's been more than one minute, but Goku hasn't generated the power he needs.
282	267	"Don't You Pick on Satan!! The Original Boo is Revived" / "Old Buu Emerges"; Transliteration: "Satan o Ijimeru na!! Ganso Bū Fukkatsu" (Japanese: サタンをいじめるな!!元祖ブウ復活)	Jun'ichi Fujise	Masashi Kubota	Yukio Ebisawa	November 8, 1995	February 17, 2003 (Ocean) March 24, 2003 (FUNimation)
Kid Buu is about to blast Vegeta, when suddenly Hercule starts to taunt Kid Buu. Kid Buu drops Vegeta, and turns his attention to Mr Satan. The world champ, thinking that it's all a dream, tries to attack Kid Buu, but is obviously far too weak to do any damage. Kid Buu is about to destroy Hercule, but suddenly stops in his tracks, clutching his head and screaming. While Hercule gloats, Kid Buu wrestles with his mind for a while, then spits out the Majin Buu's fat form, who, though not part of his physical being, was still inside of Kid Buu. Shocked and inspired from seeing Fat Buu's still body, an enraged Hercule tries to beat up Kid Buu again, but fails. Kid Buu attacks Hercule, but a blast from Fat Buu saves Hercule and begins to attack Kid Buu. Meanwhile, Goku still can't gather enough energy. He starts losing energy, and falls to the ground in his Base form.
283	268	"Vegeta's Secret Plan!! Polunga and the Two Wishes" / "Earth Reborn"; Transliteration: "Bejīta no Hisaku!! Porunga to Futatsu no Negai" (Japanese: ベジータの秘策!!神龍（ポルンガ）と2つの願い)	Yamauchi Shigeyasu	Masashi Kubota	Masayuki Uchiyama	November 15, 1995	February 18, 2003 (Ocean) March 25, 2003 (FUNimation)
Fat Buu is no match for Kid Buu, who begins to severely beat him. Hercule continues to try to help Fat Buu, but is ineffective. Vegeta suddenly comes up with a hidden plan. He communicates with Dende, telling him to go to New Namek and gather the namekian Dragon Balls. The Supreme Kai and Old Kai take Dende there, and the Namekians are waiting with the seven balls. Porunga is summoned, and Vegeta tells Dende his two wishes: bring back the Earth and restore it to its undamaged state, and bring back all of the non-evil people that died since the morning of the World Martial Arts Tournament. These wishes are granted, and even Vegeta himself comes back to life, proving that he is no longer evil. He finally reveals the main part of his plan to destroy Kid Buu: the Spirit Bomb.
284	269	"A Last Hope!! We'll Make a Huge Genki Dama" / "Call to Action"; Transliteration: "Saigo no Kibō!! Tsukuru ze Dekkai Genkidama" (Japanese: 最後の希望!!作るぜでっかい元気玉)	Kazuhito Kikuchi	Atsushi Maekawa	Shingo Ishikawa	November 22, 1995	February 19, 2003 (Ocean) March 26, 2003 (FUNimation)
The people of Earth come back to life, including the Z Fighters and their friends. Goku gets into position to create the Spirit Bomb, and with the help of King Kai, Vegeta speaks to the entire population of Earth. He tells them what's going on, and that to defeat Kid Buu, they need to raise their hands up and offer their energy. Only Goku and Vegeta's family and friends comply. No one else is willing to listen to a mysterious voice from the sky. Vegeta repeatedly pleads with the earthlings, but to no avail. While this is going on, Fat Buu is buying them time by fighting Kid Buu, but it's not going well. Goku hasn't gathered nearly enough energy to destroy Kid Buu.
285	270	"Ultra-Impressive!! The Genki Dama From Everyone is Finished" / "People of Earth Unite"; Transliteration: "Chōkangeki!! Dekita ze Minna no Genkidama" (Japanese: 超感激!!できたぜみんなの元気玉)	Yoshihiro Ueda	Atsushi Maekawa	Tadayoshi Yamamuro	November 29, 1995	February 20, 2003 (Ocean) March 27, 2003 (FUNimation)
Vegeta continues to plead with the people of Earth, but no one will listen to him. Fat Buu has finally lost all of his energy, so Vegeta is forced to fight Kid Buu. He is no match for him, and gets severely beaten. Now Goku asks the earthlings to raise up their arms, and small pockets of people who recognize his voice or just like the sound of it do so, but the vast majority remain uninterested. Piccolo, Gohan, Goten, and Trunks spread out into the city, hoping to convince people to raise their arms. Hercule has finally had enough, and he speaks to the people of Earth. When they hear the familiar voice of the World Champion, all of the people of Earth raise their arms and offer their energy. The Spirit Bomb becomes Super Spirit Bomb and is finally ready.
286	271	"Son Goku is Strongest After All!! Majin Boo is Eliminated" / "Spirit Bomb Triumphant"; Transliteration: "Yappari Saikyō Son Gokū!! Majin Bū Shōmetsu" (Japanese: やっぱり最強孫悟空!!魔人ブウ消滅)	Takahiro Imamura	Atsushi Maekawa	Yūji Hakamada	December 13, 1995	February 21, 2003 (Ocean) March 28, 2003 (FUNimation)
Goku is ready to throw the Super Spirit Bomb, but Vegeta is in the way, and, despite Vegeta's pleas otherwise, he refuses to take out Vegeta along with Kid Buu. Suddenly, Fat Buu gets up and holds Kid Buu down long enough for Hercule to pull Vegeta to safety. Kid Buu kicks Fat Buu aside, and Goku throws the Super Spirit Bomb. It hits Kid Buu, but he starts pushing it back. Goku uses all of the little energy he has left trying to push it back into Kid Buu, but he is too powerful. After a brief panic, Vegeta suddenly remembers that they still have a third and last wish with Porunga. He instructs Dende to wish for Goku's power level to be restored to its normal, healthy level. The wish is granted, and upon turning into a Super Saiyan, Goku is easily able to force the Super Spirit Bomb back at Kid Buu. As he does so, he silently wishes that Buu had been a better person, and hopes to fight him some day in the future. The Super Spirit Bomb hits with full force, finally destroying Kid Buu once and for all. After billions of years of destruction, he has finally been brought to justice.
287	272	"Peace Returns!! Majin Boo, Champion of Justice!?" / "Celebrations with Majin Buu"; Transliteration: "Modotta Heiwa!! Seigi no Mikata Majin Bū!?" (Japanese: 戻った平和!!正義の味方魔人ブウ!?)	Mitsuo Hashimoto	Atsushi Maekawa	Kazuya Hisada	December 20, 1995	February 24, 2003 (Ocean) March 31, 2003 (FUNimation)
The Supreme Kai brings himself, Dende and Old Kai back to the planet of the Kais. Dende heals Vegeta and Goku for the final time. Hercule finds the still body of Fat Buu, and asks Dende to heal him so that he won't die. But Vegeta objects and tells Hercule to move aside so he can destroy him. Vegeta says it is too dangerous for any form of Majin Buu to survive, but Hercule continues to plead with him. Goku takes Hercule's side, explaining to Vegeta that it was Fat Buu who saved Vegeta's life right before Goku threw the Super Spirit Bomb. Vegeta reluctantly agrees and the Fat Buu is healed. Supreme Kai takes them all back to Dende's lookout, where they reunite with friends and family. Goku tells his family that Old Kai gave him his life and now he can stay on earth for good as Chi-Chi breaks down in tears and hugs Goku. Six months later, they use their remaining wish with Shenron, asking him to erase the memory of Majin Buu from the mind of everyone on Earth, so that Fat Buu can assimilate into society. Life finally returns to normal on Earth, forever.
288	273	"You're Late, Goku! Everyone Party!!" / "He's Always Late"; Transliteration: "Osoi ze Gokū! Minna de Pāti!!" (Japanese: 遅いぜ悟空！みんなでパーティ!!)	Osamu Kasai	Atsushi Maekawa	Masayuki Uchiyama	January 10, 1996	February 25, 2003 (Ocean) April 2, 2003 (FUNimation)
Bulma has invited everyone to a barbecue at Capsule Corporation, and Goku's family is ready to leave. The only problem is that Goku is nowhere to be found. A frustrated Chi-Chi and the boys leave without him. While everyone's having a good time at the party, Goku is out on a mountaintop, looking after some eggs that are ready to hatch. He protects them from the storm and from predators. After they hatch, he finally arrives at the party, to the delight of everyone.
289	274	"Grandpa Goku! I Am Pan!!" / "Granddaughter Pan"; Transliteration: "Gokū Ojiichan! Watashi ga Pan yo!!" (Japanese: 悟空おじいちゃん！私がパンよ!!)	Kazuhito Kikuchi	Masashi Kubota	Naoki Miyahara	January 17, 1996	February 26, 2003 (Ocean) April 3, 2003 (FUNimation)
It is ten years later, and much has changed. Gohan has become a scholar, and Trunks and Goten are in their late teens. Goku is training with teen Goten when Bulma and Vegeta, who have a new daughter, Bulla, show up after not seeing him in five years. Goku says that he and Goten will be entering the World Martial Arts Tournament, so Vegeta says that he and Trunks will do the same. The day of the tournament comes, and old friends catch up. Everyone has arrived to watch. Gohan, who is now married to Videl, has decided not to enter, but his daughter, Goku and Chi-Chi's granddaughter Pan, will fight. Since there is no junior division this time, she will be fighting with the adults. Hercule and Majin Buu will also be fighting. However, Goku says that there is someone who is 100% human that can threaten to beat him and Vegeta.
290	275	"I Am Oob! Now Ten Years Old, the Former Majin!?" / "Buu's Reincarnation"; Transliteration: "Oira wa Ūbu! Ima Jussai de Moto Majin!?" (Japanese: オイラはウーブ！今10歳で元魔人!?)	Yoshihiro Ueda	Masashi Kubota	Yukio Ebisawa	January 24, 1996	February 27, 2003 (Ocean) April 4, 2003 (FUNimation)
The seeding draw for the tournament begins, and Goku asks Majin Buu to use his magic to rig it so that he faces the powerful mystery fighter he had talked about. In the first match, Pan faces Wild Tiger, and the four-year-old easily dispatches him. Next up is Goku against a ten-year-old boy named Uub. the reincarnation of Kid Buu. King Yemma apparently heard Goku's wish right before Kid Buu was destroyed, and he reincarnated him as a good person named Uub. Uub is apprehensive, so to bait him into fighting, Goku eventually resorts to taunting the young boy. After a particularly nasty insult and a kick to the face, Uub has snapped, and is now ready to fight.
291	276	"Even Stronger!! Goku's Dream is Super-Huge" / "Goku's Next Journey"; Transliteration: "Motto Tsuyoku!! Gokū no Yume wa Chō Dekkee" (Japanese: もっと強く!!悟空の夢は超でっけえ)	Takahiro Imamura	Masashi Kubota	Shingo Ishikawa	January 31, 1996	March 1, 2003 (Ocean) April 7, 2003 (FUNimation)
Goku and Uub begin to fight, and it's clear that Uub doesn't know much about fighting. But as the match goes on, he learns more and more, and more and more of his hidden power is released until he is able to go toe to toe with Goku in his Base state (without Goku powering up). When Goku does power up slightly (in his normal state) Uub nearly falls out of the ring, but Goku saves him from hitting the ground. He realizes that Uub doesn't even know how to fly, so Goku decides to train him. Despite his friends and family pleading with Goku to stay, he flies away with Uub on his back. Goku decides to train Uub to defend the Earth when he's gone. He hopes one day, when Uub's training is complete, to have a real all-out match with him to test their power. Goku and Uub fly off into the distance with whoops of joy.
