= Dragon Ball Z season 7 =

Dragon Ball Z
- Season 7
- DVD release poster featuring Piccolo
- No. of episodes: 25

Release
- Original network: Fuji Television
- Original release: July 28, 1993 – March 2, 1994

Season chronology
- ← Previous; Season 6 Next → Season 8

The seventh season of the Dragon Ball Z anime series contains the Other World, Great Saiyaman and World Tournament arcs, which comprises Part 1 of the Buu Saga. The episodes are produced by Toei Animation, and are based on the final 26 volumes of the Dragon Ball manga series by Akira Toriyama.

The 25-episode season originally ran from July 1993 to March 1994 in Japan on Fuji Television. The first English airing of the series was on Cartoon Network where Funimation Entertainment's dub of the series ran from September to October 2001.

Four pieces of theme music were used for this season. The opening theme, "Cha-La Head-Cha-La", is performed by Hironobu Kageyama and the ending theme, "Detekoi Tobikiri Zenkai Power!" (でてこいとびきりZENKAIパワー！, Detekoi Tobikiri Zenkai Pawā!) is performed by Manna. The second opening theme, starting with episode 200 onward, is titled "We Gotta Power" and is performed by Hironobu Kageyama, who also performs the second ending theme, "Bokutachi wa Tenshi Datta" (僕達は天使だった).

Funimation released the season in a box set on November 11, 2008, and in June 2009, announced that they would be re-releasing Dragon Ball Z in a new seven volume set called the "Dragon Boxes". Based on the original series masters with frame-by-frame restoration, the first set was released November 10, 2009.

== Episode list ==
No. overall	Initial dub no.	Translated title/Funimation's dub title Original Japanese title	Directed by	Written by	Animation directed by	Original release date	English air date
195	180	"A Deep Impression!! There They Are! The Next World's Awesome Dudes" / "Warriors of the Dead"; Transliteration: "Daikangeki!! Ita zo! Ano Yo no Sugee Yatsu" (Japanese: 大感激!!いたぞ！あの世のスゲエ奴)	Mitsuo Hashimoto	Aya Matsui	Keisuke Masunaga	July 28, 1993	September 10, 2001 (FUNimation) October 12, 2001 (Ocean)
Goku and King Kai arrive in the Otherworld. King Kai explains that the galaxy is divided into four quadrants: north, south, east, and west, and that each of these quadrants has a Kai. King Kai watches over the north. Above these four is the Grand Kai. Goku and King Kai go to the Grand Kai's planet, and upon arrival, they learn that Cell, Frieza, King Cold, and the four deceased members of the Ginyu Force are causing trouble in hell. Goku and Pikkon, a warrior from the west quadrant, are dispatched to deal with it. When they get there, Goku takes care of the Ginyu Force, and Pikkon shows off his awesome strength by doing away with the rest of them.
196	181	"I'm the Best in the Next World!! Heroes of the Ages Assembled" / "Tournament Begins"; Transliteration: "Ano Yo Ichi wa Ora da! Rekishi no Yūsha Daishūgō" (Japanese: あの世一はオラだ!!歴代の勇者大集合)	Kazuhito Kikuchi	Aya Matsui	Yūji Hakamada	August 11, 1993	September 11, 2001 (FUNimation) October 15, 2001 (Ocean)
West Kai suggests that an Otherworld Martial Arts Tournament be held to determine which quadrant has the greatest fighter. The Grand Kai agrees, and so the Tournament begins. After several matches, it is Goku's turn. His opponent grabs him and starts to tickle him into submission. Goku gets in a hit on him, and this causes his opponent to cry and start his metamorphosis into his ultimate form. But because this metamorphosis takes 1200 years, Goku is declared the winner by default.
197	182	"Grand Kaio's World Gone Wild!! Goku Kicks Up a Whirlwind" / "Water Fight"; Transliteration: "Daikaiōsei Nekkyō!! Makiokose Gokū Senpū" (Japanese: 大界王星熱狂!!まきおこせ悟空旋風)	Daisuke Nishio	Aya Matsui	Masayuki Uchiyama	August 18, 1993	September 11, 2001 (FUNimation) October 16, 2001 (Ocean)
The quarterfinals of the Otherworld Tournament are under way. In his match, Goku faces an aquatic being who fills the ring with water. Underwater, Goku is no match for him. Knowing this, he flies out of the water and aims a Kamehameha wave directly at the ring, blowing his opponent out of it. Goku wins, and is a semi-finalist, along with Tolby from the south, and Maraiko and Pikkon from the west.
198	183	"Final Round of Flame!! Goku or Paikuhan!?" / "Final Round"; Transliteration: "Honoo no Kesshō!! Gokū ka Paikūhan ka!?" (Japanese: 炎の決勝!!悟空かパイクーハンか!?)	Osamu Kasai	Aya Matsui	Yukio Ebisawa	August 25, 1993	September 13, 2001 (FUNimation) October 17, 2001 (Ocean)
The semi-finals in the Otherworld Tournament begin. Goku faces off against Maraiko of the western quadrant and wins. In the meantime, Pikkon, also of the western quadrant, defeats Tolby from the southern quadrant. In the finals, Goku and Pikkon begin to fight. After a small skirmish, both fighters reveal that they have been hiding their true strength. Pikkon takes off his weighted training clothes, and Goku transforms into a Super Saiyan.
199	184	"Don't Let Victory Get Away!! Finish With an Ultra-Fast Kamehame-Ha" / "Goku vs. Pikkon"; Transliteration: "Nigasu na Shōri!! Kimero Chōhaya Kamehameha" (Japanese: 逃すな勝利!!決めろ超速かめはめ波)	Hiroki Shibata	Aya Matsui	Naoki Miyahara	September 1, 1993	September 14, 2001 (FUNimation) October 18, 2001 (Ocean)
Now at full strength, the battle between Goku and Pikkon really heats up. The stadium is rocked with their awesome power. Since they seem evenly matched, Pikkon reveals his greatest technique: the Thunder Flash attack. Goku is flattened by this powerful blast twice. But when Pikkon decides to use it a third time, Goku finds a weakness. He uses Instant Transmission to appear right behind Pikkon and delivers a Kamehameha wave that blasts him out of the ring. It seems that Goku has won, but the Grand Kai reveals that both Goku and Pikkon touched the ceiling, which disqualifies them both. As a consolation, he offers a private lesson to both of them in a couple hundred years.
200	185	"Seven Years Since Then! Starting Today, I'm a High School Student" / "Gohan Goes to High School"; Transliteration: "Are kara Shichinen! Kyō kara Boku wa Kōkōsei" (Japanese: あれから7年！今日から僕は高校生)	Mitsuo Hashimoto	Takao Koyama	Tadayoshi Yamamuro	September 8, 1993	September 17, 2001 (FUNimation) October 19, 2001 (Ocean)
Seven years have passed since the Cell Games and Goku's sacrifice, now Gohan is a teenager. Chi-Chi decides to send him to high school for the first time, in far-off Satan City. While there, he meets Hercule's daughter, Videl. During the course of the day, he tries to hide his true strength, but he lets it slip a few times. Videl suspects that he is the Gold Fighter who foiled a robbery that very morning, but Gohan doesn't want her to find out that her suspicions are correct.
201	186	"For Love and Justice — Enter the Great Saiyaman" / "I am Saiyaman"; Transliteration: "Ai to Seigi no Gurēto Saiyaman Sanjō" (Japanese: 愛と正義のグレートサイヤマン参上)	Kazuhito Kikuchi	Hiroshi Toda	Keisuke Masunaga	September 15, 1993	September 18, 2001 (FUNimation) October 22, 2001 (Ocean)
Gohan asks Bulma for help designing a costume for his new persona, the Great Saiyaman. He learns that Trunks and Vegeta have been training vigorously. Because he can fly with his new costume without revealing his identity, he gives the Nimbus to his little brother, Goten, whom Chi Chi was pregnant with during the Cell games. Gohan uses his superhero powers to save a bus of senior citizens from a hijacking.
202	187	"Gohan's Frantic First Date!?" / "Gohan's First Date"; Transliteration: "Gohan no Hachamecha Hatsu Dēto!?" (Japanese: 悟飯のハチャメチャ初デート!?)	Daisuke Nishio	Satoru Akahori	Yūji Hakamada	September 29, 1993	November 27, 2001 (FUNimation) October 23, 2001 (Ocean)
When Gohan thinks a girl at his school, Angela, saw him transforming out of his Saiyaman outfit, he does everything he possibly can to please her so she won't reveal his identity. She asks him out on a date, so he obliges, hoping to protect his secret. A building downtown catches fire, so he leaves Angela to save the building. Afterwards, when he is looking for her, he accidentally runs into Videl. Angela sees them and thinks that Gohan is cheating on her with Videl. As quickly as it started, Gohan's first relationship is over.
203	188	"Gohan, Scramble! Save Videl!!" / "Rescue Videl"; Transliteration: "Gohan, Kinkyū Shutsudō! Bīderu o Sukue!" (Japanese: 悟飯、緊急出動！ビーデルを救え!!)	Mitsuo Hashimoto	Yoshiyuki Suga	Masayuki Uchiyama	October 20, 1993	September 19, 2001 (FUNimation) October 24, 2001 (Ocean)
Now Videl is obsessed with discovering the real identity of the Great Saiyaman, and even suspects Gohan. When she gets in trouble fighting some terrorists who have kidnapped the Mayor of Satan City, Gohan has to go save the day. He arrives and easily takes care of most of the gang, but finds that Videl is strong enough to take them out herself.
204	189	"A Case of Robbery!! The Culprit is Saiyaman!?" / "Blackmail"; Transliteration: "Tōnan Jiken Hassei!! Hannin wa Saiyaman!?" (Japanese: 盗難事件発生!!犯人はサイヤマン!?)	Takahiro Imamura	Yoshiyuki Suga	Yukio Ebisawa	October 27, 1993	September 20, 2001 (FUNimation) October 25, 2001 (Ocean)
A dinosaur friend of Goten's is kidnapped and taken to the circus. Gohan, as Saiyaman, decides to take him back to his parents before they go on a rampage in the city, but is stopped by Videl, who thinks he's stealing the baby dinosaur. When the dinosaur parents arrive, everyone finds out that Saiyaman was right, and after a brief skirmish, the parents are able to fly away safely with their baby. Unfortunately for Gohan, Finally Videl found out that he is the Great Saiyaman. She says that she will divulge his secret to the press unless he enters the World Martial Arts Tournament, and teaches her to fly.
205	190	"Goku Returning to Life!? Entry into the Tenkaichi Tournament!!" / "I'll Fight Too!"; Transliteration: "Gokū mo Fukkatsu!? Tenkaichi Budōkai Shutsujō da!!" (Japanese: 悟空も復活!?天下一武道会出場だ!!)	Yoshihiro Ueda	Aya Matsui	Masahiro Shimanuki	November 3, 1993	September 21, 2001 (FUNimation) October 26, 2001 (Ocean)
After preventing a plane crash (flight 336) in Satan City as the Great Saiyaman, Gohan tells Bulma, Trunks, and Vegeta that he'll be participating in the World Martial Arts Tournament. After Vegeta says that he, too, will enter, Goku suddenly speaks up and says that he will be allowed to come back for one day to compete. Excited, Gohan flies off to tell Krillin the good news. Along the way he is mistaken as an actor on a movie set making a film about Saiyaman. Krillin and his wife, Android 18, each decide to enter as well. Even Piccolo says that he'll participate. He and Goten begin training.
206	191	"Even Gohan is Surprised! Goten's Explosion of Power" / "The Newest Super Saiyan"; Transliteration: "Gohan mo Bikkuri! Goten no Bakuhatsu Pawā" (Japanese: 悟飯もビックリ！悟天の爆発パワー)	Osamu Kasai	Aya Matsui	Tadayoshi Yamamuro	November 10, 1993	September 24, 2001 (FUNimation) October 29, 2001 (Ocean)
Gohan begins training for the World Tournament, and he takes Goten along. During the training, Goten reveals that he can become a Super Saiyan at nearly half the age Gohan did. He also reveals that Trunks is stronger than him. Their training is interrupted by Videl, who has arrived to take her first flying lesson.
207	192	"Ah, You're Flying!! Videl's Introduction to Bukujutsu" / "Take Flight Videl"; Transliteration: "Attobeta!! Bīderu no Bukūjutsu Nyūmon" (Japanese: あっ飛べた!!ビーデルの舞空術入門)	Yamauchi Shigeyasu	Hiroshi Toda	Keisuke Masunaga	November 17, 1993	September 25, 2001 (FUNimation) October 30, 2001 (Ocean)
Gohan begins teaching Videl and Goten how to fly. Goten quickly manages to manipulate his ki and fly, but Videl has difficulties. She ends up managing to fly as well. In the meantime, Vegeta gets a nasty surprise when his son Trunks transforms into a Super Saiyan during a training session, he wondered when the transformation was reduced to a "child's play thing". He is relieved, though, to find out that Trunks is still a little stronger than Goten.
208	193	"Welcome Back, Goku! The Entire Z Team Assembles!!" / "Gather For the Tournament"; Transliteration: "Okaeri Gokū! Zetto Chīmu Zen'in Shūgō!!" (Japanese: おかえり悟空！Zチーム全員集合!!)	Kazuhito Kikuchi	Hiroshi Toda	Masayuki Uchiyama	November 24, 1993	September 26, 2001 (FUNimation) October 31, 2001 (Ocean)
Videl finally manages to fly with ease, allowing Gohan to resume training with Goten for the Tournament. The day soon arrives, and most of the Z Fighters show up to participate, including Gohan, Goten, Piccolo, Vegeta, Trunks, Android 18, and Krillin. When they arrive at the Tournament grounds, Goku appears and sees his younger son Goten for the first time.
209	194	"Watch Out, Saiyaman! Beware of Sharpshooters!?" / "Camera Shy"; Transliteration: "Ayaushi Saiyaman! Gekisha ni Goyōjin!?" (Japanese: 危うしサイヤマン！激写に御用心!?)	Yoshihiro Ueda	Takao Koyama	Yūji Hakamada	December 8, 1993	September 27, 2001 (FUNimation) November 1, 2001 (Ocean)
The Tournament officials announce that there are only sixteen spots in the Tournament, and the defending champion, Hercule, is automatically granted a spot. So, they decide the final fifteen spots with a punching machine. Although the Z Fighters try to take it easy, their scores still far outstrip the rest of the competition. Vegeta, however, does not take it easy, and completely obliterates the machine.
210	195	"No Small Matter!! Little Trunks" / "The World Tournament"; Transliteration: "Hanpa ja nai ze!! Chibi Torankusu" (Japanese: ハンパじゃないぜ!!チビトランクス)	Mitsuo Hashimoto	Sumio Uetake	Yukio Ebisawa	December 15, 1993	September 28, 2001 (FUNimation) November 2, 2001 (Ocean)
Just before the junior competition, a film is shown depicting Hercule's "triumph" over Cell. Only the Z Fighters and Hercule himself know it is a fraud. Meanwhile, Trunks runs into a bully in the waiting room, and it turns out that his first match is against this kid. With two swift kicks, Trunks effortlessly dispatches this bully.
211	196	"It's My Turn! Goten's Anxious First Fight" / "Trunks vs. Goten"; Transliteration: "Boku no Deban da! Goten, Kinchō no Daiissen" (Japanese: ボクの出番だ！悟天、緊張の第一戦)	Takahiro Imamura	Hiroshi Toda	Masahiro Shimanuki	December 22, 1993	October 1, 2001 (FUNimation) November 5, 2001 (Ocean)
It's Goten's turn now, and he happens to be fighting the brother of the kid that Trunks knocked out. Goten doesn't seem to understand that the other kids don't have the awesome abilities that he and Trunks have, and wonders why his opponent won't fight seriously. He finally takes this kid out, and makes his way to the finals, where he faces Trunks. Their battle rocks the stadium, and the spectators love it. So far, it's an even match.
212	197	"Happiness Times a Million! The Junior Champion Is Decided!!" / "Best of the Boys"; Transliteration: "Ureshisa Hyakumanbai! Shōnen Chanpion Kettei!!" (Japanese: うれしさ百万倍！少年王者（チャンピオン）決定!!)	Yamauchi Shigeyasu	Hiroshi Toda	Masayuki Uchiyama	January 12, 1994	October 2, 2001 (FUNimation) November 6, 2001 (Ocean)
The match between Goten and Trunks begins to heat up. Trunks gets Goten in a stranglehold, and Goten cannot seem to break free. Desperate, he transforms into a Super Saiyan and busts loose. Trunks is angry, because all of the Saiyan warriors agreed not to transform during the Tournament. To embarrass him for this, Trunks decides to fight the rest of the way without using his left arm. But when Goten seems to have the advantage, he uses his left arm AND transforms into a Super Saiyan to knock Goten out of the ring. Trunks says that since both he and Goten transformed once, they're even.
213	198	"Now What, Satan!? The Greatest Pinch in History" / "Big Trouble, Little Trunks"; Transliteration: "Dō suru Satan!? Shijō Saidai no Pinchi" (Japanese: どうするサタン!?史上最大のピンチ)	Kazuhito Kikuchi	Hiroshi Toda	Tadayoshi Yamamuro	January 19, 1994	October 3, 2001 (FUNimation) November 7, 2001 (Ocean)
As promised, Hercule begins a match with the junior world champion, which happens to be Trunks. Trunks thinks that Hercule is as strong as he says he is, so he is expecting a real bout. Hercule, in an attempt to trick Trunks, instructs the boy to give him the lightest punch he can. Unfortunately for Hercule, Trunks' lightest punch knocks the "champion" out of the ring, though luckily it is played off as if he let Trunks win. While waiting for the adult tournament to begin, Goku and his friends run into two weird-looking strangers, one of whom says he looks forward to fighting Goku.
214	199	"Event Match-ups Decided!! Let's Hurry and Hold the First Round" / "Who Will Fight Who?"; Transliteration: "Taisen Aite Kettei!! Hayaku Yarō ze Ikkaisen" (Japanese: 対戦相手決定!!早くやろうぜ一回戦)	Yoshihiro Ueda	Hiroshi Toda	Keisuke Masunaga	January 26, 1994	October 4, 2001 (FUNimation) November 8, 2001 (Ocean)
Trunks and Goten decide to sneak into the adult tournament. They knock out a masked fighter and take his costume, with Goten acting as the legs and Trunks as the head. It is learned that the names of the two mysterious strangers are Shin and Kibito. The tournament draws are out, and in the first round, Goku will be fighting Vegeta! But before that, Krillin, Videl, and Piccolo, who is fighting under the pseudonym 'Majunior', are scheduled to fight their respective matches.
215	200	"What's the Matter, Piccolo!? An Unheard-of No-Fight-Forfeit" / "Forfeit of Piccolo!"; Transliteration: "Dōshita Pikkoro!! Masaka no Fusenbai" (Japanese: どうしたピッコロ!!まさかの不戦敗)	Osamu Kasai	Sumio Uetake	Yūji Hakamada	February 2, 1994	October 5, 2001 (FUNimation) November 9, 2001 (Ocean)
In the first match, Krillin easily defeats his incredibly large opponent. Now it's Piccolo's turn to fight the mysterious Shin. Once the match starts, Piccolo seems to be paralyzed with fear. Suddenly, he realizes who Shin is, and forfeits the match. He tells Goku that Shin is unimaginably strong. Videl and the large Spopovich fight next.
216	201	"Undyingly Unpleasant!? The Mystery of Spopovitch" / "A Dark and Secret Power"; Transliteration: "Fujimi de Bukimi!? Supopobitchi no Nazo" (Japanese: 不死身で不気味!?スポポビッチの謎)	Mitsuo Hashimoto	Katsuyuki Sumisawa	Shingo Ishikawa	February 9, 1994	October 8, 2001 (FUNimation) November 12, 2001 (Ocean)
Videl's fight with Spopovich begins. She seems to have the upper hand in this bout, but every time she knocks him down, he gets back up, even when it seems impossible. As the fight continues, Spopovich begins to take the upper hand. To counter, Videl deals him a ferocious kick to the head. This kick turns Spopovich's head all the way around! Although it seems like he is dead, he suddenly gets back up and straightens his head out. Meanwhile, Shin reveals to Piccolo that he is the Supreme Kai. He gives him no more details, but tells Piccolo to keep it a secret.
217	202	"A Tragic Videl!! Are You Coming Out, Angry Super Gohan?" / "Videl is Crushed"; Transliteration: "Bīderu Muzan!! Deru ka Ikari no Sūpā Gohan" (Japanese: ビーデル無残!!出るか怒りの超悟飯)	Kazuhito Kikuchi	Katsuyuki Sumisawa	Yukio Ebisawa	February 16, 1994	October 9, 2001 (FUNimation) November 13, 2001 (Ocean)
Spopovich starts wailing on Videl, and there's nothing she can do about it. When it seems like he is about to deal out her final blow, Gohan decides that he's seen too much, and goes out to rescue her. Suddenly Yamu, Spopovich's partner, tells him to stop punishing Videl and to finish the match. Spopovich tosses her out of the ring, and he and Yamu leave for the moment. With Videl badly injured, Goku goes to get some senzu beans from Korin.
218	203	"Exposed!! The Saiyaman is Son Gohan!" / "Identities Revealed"; Transliteration: "Barechatta!! Saiyaman wa Son Gohan" (Japanese: バレちゃった!!サイヤマンは孫悟飯)	Yoshihiro Ueda	Takao Koyama	Masayuki Uchiyama	February 23, 1994	October 10, 2001 (FUNimation) November 14, 2001 (Ocean)
Gohan is waiting anxiously for Goku to return with the senzu beans. Finally, the hero arrives, and Gohan takes a bean to Videl, who heals instantly. Gohan and Kibito start their match, but no punches are thrown. Kibito asks to see Gohan's Super Saiyan power, and Piccolo tells Gohan to show him. Piccolo informs the others that Shin is the Supreme Kai, who then informs the Z Fighters not to intervene if anything happens to Gohan. Gohan begins to power up.
219	204	"A Slithering Conspiracy!! Gohan's Power is Stolen" / "Energy Drain"; Transliteration: "Ugomeku Inbō!! Gohan no Pawā ga Ubawareta" (Japanese: うごめく陰謀!!悟飯の力（パワー）が奪われた)	Takahiro Imamura	Takao Koyama	Masahiro Shimanuki	March 2, 1994	October 11, 2001 (FUNimation) November 15, 2001 (Ocean)
Gohan fully powers up, and just as Supreme Kai predicted, Spopovich and Yamu suddenly attack him. They stick a weird device inside him, steal all of his energy, and then leave. Supreme Kai takes off after them, and Goku, Piccolo, Krillin, and Vegeta follow. Kibito heals Gohan, and those two and Videl also leave. Supreme Kai explains that long ago there was a wizard named Bibidi who created a monster with unbelievable destructive power. Supreme Kai killed Bibidi, and the monster, Majin Buu, was left sealed in a ball. Now Bibidi's son, Babidi, has come to resurrect the monster, and they plan to use Gohan's stolen energy to do it.
