= Dragon Ball Z season 8 =

Dragon Ball Z
- Season 8
- DVD release poster featuring Majin Vegeta
- No. of episodes: 34

Release
- Original network: Fuji Television
- Original release: March 9, 1994 – January 25, 1995

Season chronology
- ← Previous; Season 7 Next → Season 9

The eighth and penultimate season of the Dragon Ball Z anime series contains the Babidi and Majin Buu arcs, which comprises Part 2 of the Buu Saga. The episodes are produced by Toei Animation, and are based on the final 26 volumes of the Dragon Ball manga series by Akira Toriyama.

The 34-episode season originally ran from March 1994 to January 1995 in Japan on Fuji Television. The first English airing of the series was on Cartoon Network where Funimation Entertainment's dub of the series ran from October 2001 to October 2002.

Funimation released the season in a box set on February 10, 2009, and in June 2009, announced that they would be re-releasing Dragon Ball Z in a new seven volume set called the "Dragon Boxes". Based on the original series masters with frame-by-frame restoration, the first set was released November 10, 2009.

== Episode list ==
| No. overall | Initial dub no. | Translated title/Funimation's dub title Original Japanese title | Directed by | Written by | Animation directed by | Original release date | English air date |
|---|---|---|---|---|---|---|---|
| 220 | 205 | "The Man Behind the Curtains Appears!! The Evil Madoshi Babidi" / "The Wizard's Curse"; Transliteration: "Kuromaku Tōjō!! Aku no Madōshi Babidi" (Japanese: 黒幕登場!!悪の魔導師バビディ) | Yoshihiro Ueda | Hiroshi Toda | Keisuke Masunaga | March 9, 1994 | October 12, 2001 (FUNimation) February 25, 2002 (Ocean) |
Videl can't keep up with Gohan and Kibito, so she decides to go back. Before she leaves she realizes that Gohan was the kid who defeated Cell and not her father, and says that she will date him once he comes back. They follow Spopovich and Yamu to Babidi's spaceship. Babidi comes out, along with his new partner Dabura, the King of the Demons. After Spopovich and Yamu deliver the energy to Babidi, the wizard has no use for them, and he kills both of them.
| 221 | 206 | "The Awaiting Trap!! A Challenge from the Demon Realm" / "King of the Demons"; Transliteration: "Machiukeru Wana!! Makai kara no Chōsenjō" (Japanese: 待ち受けるワナ!!魔界からの挑戦状) | Kazuhito Kikuchi | Hiroshi Toda | Yūji Hakamada | March 16, 1994 | October 15, 2001 (FUNimation) February 25, 2002 (Ocean) |
Babidi enters the spaceship, but Dabura suddenly flies over to the Z Fighters, and he kills Kibito. Goku and Vegeta take some shots at him, but they miss. Dabura spits on Krillin and Piccolo, turning them both to stone. The only way to revive them is to kill Dabura. This lures the warriors into the ship. Upon arrival, they meet Babidi's henchman, Pui Pui, who tells them that they must fight a different opponent on each level of the spaceship, and as they are beaten up, their energy will be absorbed by the room and injected into the ball that contains Majin Buu.
| 222 | 207 | "Don't Toy With Me!! Vegeta's Breakthrough First Strike of Fury" / "Vegeta Attacks"; Transliteration: "Nameru na!! Bejīta Ikari no Shosen Toppa" (Japanese: なめるな!!ベジータ怒りの初戦突破) | Mitsuo Hashimoto | Hiroshi Toda | Shingo Ishikawa | March 23, 1994 | October 16, 2001 (FUNimation) February 26, 2002 (Ocean) |
Vegeta starts to beat up Pui Pui with no effort. To give his fighter the advantage, Babidi changes the room to mimic Pui Pui's home planet, where the gravity is ten times that of Earth's. Unfortunately for Pui Pui, Vegeta trains at five hundred times of Earth's gravity, and he easily destroys Pui Pui. They move on to the second level where Goku will fight Babidi's pet monster Yakon.
| 223 | 208 | "Goku's Power Wide Open!! Blow Away Yakon" / "Next Up, Goku"; Transliteration: "Gokū Pawā Zenkai!! Buttobe Yakon" (Japanese: 悟空パワー全開!!ブッ飛べヤコン) | Yoshihiro Ueda | Hiroshi Toda | Masayuki Uchiyama | April 13, 1994 | October 17, 2001 (FUNimation) February 27, 2002 (Ocean) |
Goku and Yakon start to fight. Goku is obviously stronger than Yakon, so Babidi changes the environment to mimic the Planet of Darkness, which is Yakon's home planet. To help himself see, Goku becomes a Super Saiyan. Yakon, the devourer of light, sucks up the light emitting from Goku. Seeing this, Goku again becomes a Super Saiyan, allowing Yakon to suck up all the light energy he can. Finally, he becomes a Super Saiyan 2 and gives off a flash of brilliant energy which is too much for Yakon to handle. Victorious, the fighters head to the next level.
| 224 | 209 | "A Great Miscalculation!! Satan vs. Three Super-Warriors!?" / "Battle Supreme"; Transliteration: "Daigosan!! Satan tai Sannin no Chōsenshi!?" (Japanese: 大誤算!!サタンVS3人の超戦士!?) | Osamu Kasai | Hiroshi Toda | Yukio Ebisawa | April 20, 1994 | October 18, 2001 (FUNimation) February 28, 2002 (Ocean) |
The fighters move to the third level. This time, it's Gohan's turn to fight. Dabura decides that he will fight this time, but first he goes to the meditation chamber to prepare. Meanwhile, back at the World Martial Arts Tournament, only five fighters remain because the rest of them flew away. Hercule decides to finish the tournament with all five remaining fighters in the ring at the same time. 18 takes out one of them, and Mighty Mask, composed of Goten and Trunks, takes out another. Now it's down to those two and Hercule.
| 225 | 210 | "Such Strong Kids!! No. 18's Close Fight!?" / "Eighteen Unmasks"; Transliteration: "Tsuyoi ze Chibikko!! Jūhachigō Daikusen!?" (Japanese: 強いぜチビッコ!!18号大苦戦!?) | Kazuhito Kikuchi | Hiroshi Toda | Masahiro Shimanuki | April 27, 1994 | October 22, 2001 (FUNimation) April 16, 2002 (Ocean) |
18 and Mighty Mask (Goten and Trunks) start to fight, and because they are able to use their arms and legs simultaneously as Mighty Mask, they have the upper hand against 18. But when she steps up the intensity, they can't keep up with her, so they decide to turn into Super Saiyans. This, of course, blows their cover, and they are disqualified as teams are not allowed in the tournament as Goten and Trunks are forced to flee, much to their mothers' ennoyed. Now it is down to 18 and Hercule. Meanwhile, Dabura has finally finished his meditation, and is ready to fight Gohan.
| 226 | 211 | "Confrontation with the Demon King! It's Your Turn, Gohan!!" / "Pay to Win"; Transliteration: "Tachihadakaru Maō! Deban da Gohan!!" (Japanese: たちはだかる魔王！出番だ悟飯!!) | Mitsuo Hashimoto | Masashi Kubota | Keisuke Masunaga | May 4, 1994 | October 23, 2001 (FUNimation) April 17, 2002 (Ocean) |
18 gets Hercule in a headlock, and she uses the opportunity to cut him a deal: she'll throw the match if he pays her double what he wins for the title. He reluctantly agrees, and the fight soon ends with Hercule as the victor. Over in Babidi's spaceship, Dabura finally emerges ready to fight. Babidi sends them to a planet similar to earth so their fight won't damage the ship. As their battle begins, Gohan finds that Dabura is a tough opponent, so he revs up his power to Super Saiyan 2.
| 227 | 212 | "A Wicked Heart Discovered!! Dabura's Great Idea" / "Heart of a Villain"; Transliteration: "Mitsukerareta Jashin!! Dābura no Meian" (Japanese: 見つけられた邪心!!ダーブラの名案) | Yoshihiro Ueda | Masashi Kubota | Yūji Hakamada | May 18, 1994 | October 24, 2001 (FUNimation) April 18, 2002 (Ocean) |
Gohan and Dabura continue fighting, and from the outset it is clear that Gohan has lost his edge after not training for seven years and as a result is weaker than when he fought and killed Cell. Nonetheless, Gohan is fighting Dabura to a stalemate. However, his lack of fighting sense and inability to gain an advantage on Dabura causes Vegeta to begin to lose his cool, especially when Dabura begins to pressure Gohan in the fight. Noticing this, Dabura tells Babidi to return them all to the ship. He privately informs Babidi that Vegeta has a terrible rage burning inside him, and that he could be made to serve their purposes. Meanwhile, Goten and Trunks see Videl flying back to the stadium, and she tells them all about what's happening. Excited at the prospect of seeing magic and a wizard (although they reveal that they don't even know what a wizard is), they race off after the others.
| 228 | 213 | "Vegeta, Prince of Destruction, Revived!! Intrusion at the Tournament" / "The Dark Prince Returns"; Transliteration: "Hakai Ōji Bejīta Fukkatsu!! Butōkai Rannyū" (Japanese: 破壊王子ベジータ復活!!武闘会乱入) | Kazuhito Kikuchi | Masashi Kubota | Masayuki Uchiyama | May 25, 1994 | October 25, 2001 (FUNimation) April 19, 2002 (Ocean) |
Goku, Gohan, Vegeta, and the Supreme Kai are left wondering why Dabura suddenly stopped the fight. Vegeta berates Gohan for not defeating Dabura and Gohan realized that Vegeta should've fought Dabura and then Krillin and Piccolo would be restored to normal. Vegeta decides to blow up the ship and Supreme Kai begs him not to and Vegeta refuses to listen and Goku stops Vegeta. Supreme Kai then realizes that Vegeta is the new recruit that Dabura was talking about. Suddenly, Babidi tries to take over Vegeta's mind. Although he is urged to fight it, Babidi's magic is too strong, and Vegeta's impure heart gives in. Now with Babidi's "M" on his forehead, he has turned evil. Babidi transports them all back to the World Martial Arts stadium where he instructs Majin Vegeta to kill his friends. Majin Vegeta refuses, as he apparently has not lost complete control of his mind. He says that his only goal is to fight Goku. To bait Goku into fighting him, Majin Vegeta destroys part of the stadium and several city blocks, killing thousands.
| 229 | 214 | "The Super-confrontation of Destiny!! The Clash of Goku vs. Vegeta" / "Vegeta's Pride"; Transliteration: "Shukumei no Chōtaiketsu!! Gekitotsu Gokū tai Bejīta" (Japanese: 宿命の超対決!!激突悟空VSベジータ) | Mitsuo Hashimoto | Sumio Uetake | Shingo Ishikawa | June 15, 1994 | October 29, 2001 (FUNimation) April 22, 2002 (Ocean) |
Goku refuses to fight Majin Vegeta, so Majin Vegeta destroys another part of the stadium. To avoid any further casualties, Goku reluctantly agrees to fight. The Supreme Kai tries to stop him, but he sees that it is no use. Goku tells Babidi to transport them far away from people, and the wizard obliges. The Supreme Kai and Gohan decide to break into the next level of the ship and try and stop Babidi. To avoid this, Babidi commands Majin Vegeta to kill the Supreme Kai, but Majin Vegeta refuses. Though Babidi is possessing him, Majin Vegeta can only focus on one thing: fighting Goku. Goku gives Gohan one of the last two senzu beans before he and the Supreme Kai go further into the ship. Majin Vegeta and Goku power themselves up to their maximum levels of Super Saiyan 2, and are ready to fight.
| 230 | 215 | "Just You Wait, Babidi!! Your Aspirations Will Not Be Allowed" / "The Long Awaited Fight"; Transliteration: "Mattero Babidi!! Yabō wa Yurusanai" (Japanese: 待ってろバビディ!!野望は許さない) | Kazuhito Kikuchi | Sumio Uetake | Yukio Ebisawa | June 22, 1994 | October 30, 2001 (FUNimation) April 23, 2002 (Ocean) |
Goku and Majin Vegeta start to fight, and their raw power is astounding. Both fighters possess incredible ability, and so far, the fight seems to be a draw. Majin Vegeta is able to lock Goku to a boulder with cuffs made of energy. He tells Goku how he has stolen his royal destiny by beating Frieza and becoming a Super Saiyan first, and how insulting it was to be surpassed in power by the child Gohan who become Super Saiyan 2. Goku is able to break free, and the battle resumes with crushing force. Meanwhile, Gohan and the Supreme Kai have made it all the way to Buu's ball, but Babidi and Dabura are waiting for them.
| 231 | 216 | "The Seal is Broken! Out Comes the Vicious Majin Boo!!" / "Magic Ball of Buu"; Transliteration: "Toketa Fūin! Deruzo Kyōaku Majin Bū!!" (Japanese: 解けた封印！出るぞ凶悪魔人ブウ!!) | Osamu Kasai | Hiroshi Toda | Kazuya Hisada | June 29, 1994 | November 1, 2001 (FUNimation) April 24, 2002 (Ocean) |
Goku and Majin Vegeta continue their battle. Majin Vegeta reveals that he knew he could never surpass Goku's strength, so he allowed himself to be taken over by Babidi. He had seen what it had done to Spopovich and Yamu, and he wanted the power for himself. He also says that he wanted Babidi to reawaken the evil in his heart. Over the years, he had become like a normal person; he had a wife and a son, and thought the Earth was a nice place to live. He wanted Babidi's magic to free him from "those petty attachments", but Goku doesn't believe him. Meanwhile, before Gohan and the Supreme Kai can stop Babidi, Majin Buu has finally gathered enough energy, and has begun to hatch.
| 232 | 217 | "I Won't Allow the Revival!! A Kamehame-Ha of Resistance" / "Buu is Hatched!" and "Majin Buu Appears"; Transliteration: "Fukkatsu Sasenai!! Teikō no Kamehameha" (Japanese: 復活させない!!抵抗のかめはめ波) | Yamauchi Shigeyasu | Hiroshi Toda | Tadayoshi Yamamuro | July 6, 1994 | November 5, 2001 (FUNimation) April 25, 2002 (Ocean) |
In an attempt to abort the hatching, Gohan begins firing Kamehameha waves at the ball, but it doesn't seem to do much good. The ball opens, but after some pink steam escapes, there is nothing left in the ball. They believe that Gohan destroyed Buu with his energy blasts, but suddenly the pink steam begins to congeal. It forms into Majin Buu. Instead of a fearsome beast, Majin Buu is a fat, pink happy child, but the Supreme Kai knows that it is really Majin Buu and not something else. Goku and Majin Vegeta have noticed the sudden upsurge in power, and realize that Majin Buu has been hatched.
| 233 | 218 | "A Straight Line to Despair!? The Grief of Kaioshin" / "The Losses Begin"; Transliteration: "Zetsubō e Itchokusen!? Nageki no Kaiōshin" (Japanese: 絶望へ一直線!?嘆きの界王神) | Mitsuo Hashimoto | Toshinobu Ooi | Masayuki Uchiyama | July 13, 1994 | November 6, 2001 (FUNimation) April 26, 2002 (Ocean) |
Dabura insults Majin Buu, and with a single blow, Majin Buu dispatches with the King of the Demons. Goku and Majin Vegeta feel Buu's surge of power, and Goku convinces Majin Vegeta to postpone the fight until they can take out Majin Buu. Majin Vegeta says he doesn't want Goku distracted while they're fighting. As Goku is preparing to leave, Majin Vegeta knocks him out with a blow to the head and takes the final senzu bean, and promises to kill Majin Buu himself. Babidi's first order to Majin Buu is to kill Gohan and the supreme kai. Gohan grabs Shin and takes off, but even with their head start, Majin Buu catches up to them with blinding speed. With a single blow, Majin Buu puts Gohan out of commission, leaving the Supreme Kai unguarded.
| 234 | 219 | "The Terrifying Majin!! Death's Dread Draws Near Gohan" / "The Terror of Majin Buu"; Transliteration: "Majin Osorubeshi!! Gohan ni Semaru Shi no Kyōfu" (Japanese: 魔人恐るべし!!悟飯に迫る死の恐怖) | Kazuhito Kikuchi | Masashi Kubota | Keisuke Masunaga | July 27, 1994 | November 7, 2001 (FUNimation) April 29, 2002 (Ocean) |
The supreme kai defends himself as best he can against Majin Buu, but he is no match for him. Majin Buu pounds the supreme kai into the ground, and is preparing to eat him when Gohan flies in and knocks Majin Buu away. Gohan's recovery is short-lived, because Majin Buu hits him with an energy blast of incredible power. As Gohan falls to the Earth in a forest, he is very badly injured. Goten and Trunks arrive at the outskirts of the scene and notice the "statues" of Piccolo and Krillin. Trunks accidentally breaks the Piccolo statue. As Majin Buu is preparing to eat Shin, Dabura suddenly throws a spear through him. Dabura warns Babidi that he will soon lose control of Majin Buu and his monster will turn on him. Babidi doesn't believe him, and now Majin Buu's plans have changed: Dabura is next on the menu.
| 235 | 220 | "'Gonna Eat'cha!!' The Hungry Majin's Supernatural Powers" / "Meal Time"; Transliteration: "Tabechau zo!! Harapeko Majin no Chōnōryoku" (Japanese: 食べちゃうぞ!!腹ペコ魔人の超能力) | Jun'ichi Fujise | Masashi Kubota | Yūji Hakamada | August 3, 1994 | November 8, 2001 (FUNimation) April 30, 2002 (Ocean) |
Dabura tries his best to destroy Majin Buu, but he is nowhere near strong enough to do the job. Majin Buu turns him into a cookie and eats him. With Dabura gone, Krillin and Piccolo, despite his statue being slightly broken, are able to come back to life. Just as Majin Buu's about to eat the Supreme Kai, Majin Vegeta makes his presence known by destroying Babidi's spaceship. Majin Vegeta knows what Buu did to Gohan, and he vows that when Goku regains consciousness, this will all be over, even if it costs him his own life. He promises to atone for what he's done, and he powers up. At full strength, he ferociously attacks Majin Buu.
| 236 | 221 | "A Warrior's Resolution!! I Will Dispose of the Majin" / "The Warrior's Decision"; Transliteration: "Senshi no Ketsui!! Majin wa Ore ga Shimatsu-suru" (Japanese: 戦士の決意!!魔人はオレが始末する) | Yamauchi Shigeyasu | Masashi Kubota | Shingo Ishikawa | August 17, 1994 | November 12, 2001 (FUNimation) May 1, 2002 (Ocean) |
Though incredibly powerful, Majin Vegeta's attacks do nothing to Majin Buu. He even blasts a hole in the monster, but Majin Buu is able to regenerate his body. Tired of playing around, Majin Buu rocks the entire planet by powering up. He then rips off part of his own belly and is able to wrap it around Majin Vegeta. Trapped, the Saiyan prince can do nothing to defend himself. Trunks can't stand to see his father tortured like this, so he powers up and jets off to help him, and Goten follows.
| 237 | 222 | "For Those Whom He Loves... Vegeta Perishes!!" / "Final Atonement"; Transliteration: "Ai suru Mono no Tame ni... Bejīta Chiru!!" (Japanese: 愛する者のために...ベジータ散る!!) | Mitsuo Hashimoto | Takao Koyama | Yukio Ebisawa | August 24, 1994 | November 13, 2001 (FUNimation) May 2, 2002 (Ocean) |
Trunks knocks Majin Buu away from his father, and he and Goten free Vegeta from his bonds. Piccolo attacks Babidi, and despite the wizard using all of his magic to defend himself, Piccolo is able to slice him in half. Majin Vegeta recovers, and tells Trunks that he is proud of him. For the first time, Majin Vegeta embraces his son. He then knocks out Goten and Trunks, allowing Piccolo to carry them away to safety. With Majin Buu back and ready for more, Majin Vegeta makes the ultimate sacrifice: he erupts in a blinding flash of light, certainly killing anything near him, including himself.
| 238 | 223 | "The Nightmare Revisited!! Majin Boo Has Survived" / "Evil Lives On"; Transliteration: "Akumu Futatabi! Ikiteita Majin Bū" (Japanese: 悪夢ふたたび!!生きていた魔人ブウ) | Kazuhito Kikuchi | Takao Koyama | Masayuki Uchiyama | August 31, 1994 | May 3, 2002 (Ocean) September 16, 2002 (FUNimation) |
After Majin Vegeta's eruption, Piccolo returns to the scene of the battle. He finds no sign of Majin Vegeta left, and that Majin Buu has been blasted into thousands of small pieces. He also finds the top half of Babidi, who is begging for help. Suddenly, the pieces of Majin Buu begin to reform. They all combine to make Majin Buu whole again. Knowing he's outmatched, Piccolo retreats. Majin Buu heals Babidi and the two embark on a killing spree. Piccolo catches up with Krillin, telling him that the world's last hope, Goten and Trunks, must be protected. Krillin is instructed to take the two young Saiyans to Dende's lookout. Meanwhile, the Supreme Kai has recovered and is searching for Gohan.
| 239 | 224 | "The Struggle of Videl and the Others! Find the Dragon Balls" / "Find the Dragon Balls"; Transliteration: "Bīderutachi no Funtō! Sagase Doragon Bōru" (Japanese: ビーデルたちの奮闘！探せ神龍球（ドラゴンボール）) | Yamauchi Shigeyasu | Takao Koyama | Keisuke Masunaga | September 7, 1994 | May 6, 2002 (Ocean) September 17, 2002 (FUNimation) |
Yamcha, 18, Bulma, Videl, and Chi Chi, among others, go looking for the Dragon Balls. Their search for the seventh one leads them to a nest full of eggs, but before Bulma can grab it, a dinosaur eats the entire nest. Yamcha hits the beast with an energy ball, which causes it to fly into the ocean. Videl goes swimming after it, and with a little help from Master Roshi, they are able to extract the ball. Piccolo and Krillin arrive at the lookout with the unconscious Goten and Trunks. Soon after, Goku regains consciousness and appears at the lookout himself.
| 240 | 225 | "Enormous Hope!! A New Finishing Technique for the Little Squirts" / "Revival"; Transliteration: "Dekkai Kibō!! Chibitachi no Shin Hissatsu Waza" (Japanese: でっかい希望!!チビたちの新必殺技) | Hiroki Shibata | Takao Koyama | Yūji Hakamada | September 21, 1994 | May 7, 2002 (Ocean) September 18, 2002 (FUNimation) |
While discussing tactics, Goku reveals that he knows of a method by which two similar-sized people can fuse together into one ultimate being. They decide that Goten and Trunks will learn this new trick, but the only problem is that it will take about a week to learn it, and Goku has less than a day left on Earth. Piccolo decides to teach the boys after Goku is gone. Suddenly, the sky turns black, and they realize that Bulma is calling the dragon. Goku uses Instant Transmission to appear at Capsule Corp. but arrive too late because she has already made one wish. Her wish was to bring back everyone that died today. Goku tells Shenron that they will postpone their second wish, and uses Instant Transmission to take everyone there back to the lookout with him. Meanwhile, Kibito awakens because of the wish, and the Supreme Kai is still searching for Gohan.
| 241 | 226 | "Goten and Trunks — The World's Most Wanted" / "Global Announcement"; Transliteration: "Goten Torankusu Zensekai ni Shimei Tehai" (Japanese: 悟天トランクス全世界に指名手配) | Mitsuo Hashimoto | Takao Koyama | Shingo Ishikawa | September 28, 1994 | May 8, 2002 (Ocean) September 19, 2002 (FUNimation) |
Kibito finds the Supreme Kai and heals him. Then, both of them find Gohan, and decide to take him to the world of the Kais. Meanwhile, back at the lookout, Goku breaks the news about Vegeta and Gohan to everyone, as both of them are believed to be dead. As expected, everyone is shocked; Chi-Chi faints after realizing that she has now lost both her husband and older son, Bulma screams for Vegeta and breaks down crying, and Videl becomes heartbroken and cries, but refuses to believe Gohan is dead. They are just about to wake Trunks and Goten when Babidi suddenly starts a global announcement. He tells everyone that he and Majin Buu will terrorize the entire planet until Piccolo, Goten, and Trunks show themselves. To give them a taste of what's in store, he shows Majin Buu turning the entire population of a major city into small candies, which he greedily consumes.
| 242 | 227 | "Gohan Revived — Kaioshin's Secret Weapon!?" / "Learn to Fuse"; Transliteration: "Gohan Fukkatsu!! Kaiōshin no Himitsu Heiki!?" (Japanese: 悟飯復活界王神の秘密兵器!?) | Kazuhito Kikuchi | Takao Koyama | Tadayoshi Yamamuro | October 12, 1994 | May 9, 2002 (Ocean) September 23, 2002 (FUNimation) |
Babidi tells the Earth's people that anyone with any information about Piccolo, Goten, or Trunks should tell him. To stop any further damage, Piccolo wants to turn himself in, but Goku convinces him not to, because he knows that even if the three turn themselves it, it won't stop Majin Buu's destruction. Goten and Trunks wake up, and they learn about Vegeta and Gohan's (supposed) demise. Goku is harsh with them, because they can't waste any time mourning right now. The boys, although angry and sad at Goku for not saving Gohan and Vegeta, know that they must be tough to stop Majin Buu. In the world of the Kais, Kibito heals Gohan, and the Supreme Kai tells him about the Z Sword. It is a mystical sword that contains great power, and even the Kais themselves could not pull it from the rock it is now stuck in. The Supreme Kai believes that Gohan possesses the strength to do so.
| 243 | 228 | "It Came Ou~t!! The Legendary Z-Sword" / "The Z Sword"; Transliteration: "Nuketā〜!! Densetsu no Zetto Sōdo" (Japanese: 抜けたァ～!!伝説のゼットソード) | Yamauchi Shigeyasu | Masashi Kubota | Masayuki Uchiyama | October 19, 1994 | May 10, 2002 (Ocean) September 24, 2002 (FUNimation) |
Gohan attempts to free the Z Sword, but can't do it in his normal state. He transforms into a Super Saiyan, and with a mighty heave, he frees the sword from the rock. To his great surprise, the sword is incredibly heavy, and he must now train himself to use it. Back on Earth, Babidi and Majin Buu continue their reign of terror, and Goten and Trunks tell him that they're going to destroy him and Buu.
| 244 | 229 | "Metro West is Targeted! Stop, Majin Boo!!" / "Race to Capsule Corp."; Transliteration: "Nerawareta Nishi no Miyako! Tomare Majin Bū!!" (Japanese: 狙われた西の都！止まれ魔人ブウ!!) | Jun'ichi Fujise | Reiko Yoshida | Yukio Ebisawa | November 2, 1994 | May 13, 2002 (Ocean) September 25, 2002 (FUNimation) |
Goten and Trunks begin their fusion training, but it is soon interrupted by Babidi. He announces that he has learned where Trunks lives, and he and Majin Buu are now on their way to kill him. Goku sends Trunks to get the Dragon Radar from Capsule Corporation before it is destroyed, and he himself heads off to slow down Majin Buu and Babidi. He asks Majin Buu why he takes orders from someone as weak as Babidi. Though Majin Buu seems intrigued by the thought of killing his master, he dislikes Goku as much as he does Babidi, so he decides to attack Goku. Goku knows that an Ascended Super Saiyan isn't enough to stop Majin Buu, so he says he'll take it up to the next level.
| 245 | 230 | "An Astounding Great Transformation!! Super Saiyan 3" / "Super Saiyan 3?!"; Transliteration: "Atto Odoroku Daihenshin!! Sūpā Saiyajin Surī" (Japanese: アッと驚く大変身!!超サイヤ人3) | Mitsuo Hashimoto | Hiroshi Toda | Ichio Hayashi | November 9, 1994 | May 14, 2002 (Ocean) September 26, 2002 (FUNimation) |
To buy as much time as possible, Goku demonstrates the Super Saiyan transformations. He starts in his normal form, then goes to Super Saiyan, then Super Saiyan 2. He then transforms into Super Saiyan 3, and the immense power of this transformation rocks the entire planet. His hair grows down to his knees, and his eyes change, and his eyebrows disappear. His power is so incredible that Gohan, the Supreme Kai, and Kibito can feel it in the world of the Kais. As a Super Saiyan 3, he possesses even more power than Majin Buu. He starts to pound Majin Buu with relative ease. At Capsule Corporation, Trunks and Dr. Brief frantically search for the Dragon Radar.
| 246 | 231 | "Bye Bye Babidi!! Majin Boo Rebels" / "Buu's Mutiny"; Transliteration: "Bai Bai Babidi!! Majin Bū Hangyaku" (Japanese: バイバイ・バビディ!!魔人ブウ反逆) | Kazuhito Kikuchi | Hiroshi Toda | Shingo Ishikawa | November 16, 1994 | May 15, 2002 (Ocean) September 30, 2002 (FUNimation) |
Goku continues his awesome display of power, but with each blow to Majin Buu, the monster gets even more powerful. He seems to have an unlimited well of energy to use. Bulma calls Trunks on Videl's cell phone to tell him that she left the Dragon Radar in the airplane. He retrieves the radar, and heads back to the lookout. Goku senses this, and decides to end his fight with Majin Buu. He once again tells Majin Buu that he's much too skilled to be taking orders from Babidi. Goku Instantly Transmits himself back to the lookout. This time, Majin Buu takes Goku's advice and turns on his master. He executes Babidi. Meanwhile, Gohan continues his training with the Z Sword.
| 247 | 232 | "Absurdly Awful-Looking!? The Special Training Transformation Pose" / "The Fusion Dance"; Transliteration: "Mecha Kakko Warui!? Tokkun Henshin Pōzu" (Japanese: メチャカッコ悪い!?特訓変身ポーズ) | Yamauchi Shigeyasu | Hiroshi Toda | Keisuke Masunaga | November 23, 1994 | May 16, 2002 (Ocean) October 1, 2002 (FUNimation) |
Without Babidi to control him, Majin Buu is happily free to go on a spree of destruction. Trunks returns to the lookout with the Dragon Radar. Baba shows up to tell Goku that he only has thirty minutes left. His transformation into Super Saiyan 3 was very draining, and it ate up a lot of his time that was left. Even though he is exhausted, he begins teaching Goten and Trunks the Fusion Dance. On the world of the Kais, Gohan begins training with even more intensity than before, determined to save the universe from Majin Buu.
| 248 | 233 | "See You Later, Everybody!! Goku Returns to the Other World" / "Goku's Time is Up"; Transliteration: "Jā na Minna!! Gokū Ano Yo ni Kaeru" (Japanese: じゃあなみんな!!悟空あの世に帰る) | Mitsuo Hashimoto | Hiroshi Toda | Masayuki Uchiyama | November 30, 1994 | May 17, 2002 (Ocean) October 2, 2002 (FUNimation) |
Majin Buu clears some space in the countryside and builds a house for him to live in. Goten and Trunks continue learning the Fusion Dance, and begin to master the technique. They each plead with Goku for him to show them the Super Saiyan 3 transformation, and because he knows his time is up, Goku complies. Soon after the transformation, Baba shows up to take him away. Goku says goodbye to everyone, including Chi-Chi and Goten at the lookout and tells them that he will find Gohan in Other World, but Videl insists that Gohan is still alive somewhere. Once again, he is gone, leaving Piccolo in charge of training Goten and Trunks.
| 249 | 234 | "Where is Gohan!? Ferocious Training in the Kaioshin Realm" / "Return to Other World"; Transliteration: "Gohan wa Doko da!? Kaiōshinkai no Mōtokkun" (Japanese: 悟飯はどこだ!?界王神界の猛特訓) | Yoshihiro Ueda | Masashi Kubota | Tadayoshi Yamamuro | December 7, 1994 | May 20, 2002 (Ocean) October 3, 2002 (FUNimation) |
Back in Other World, Goku visits King Yemma to ask him if he's seen Gohan. King Yemma says that Gohan has not checked in. Thrilled that his son is still alive just like Videl said, he searches for his energy signal, and uses Instant Transmission to go there. He starts to help Gohan with his training with the Z Sword until Gohan is ready to fight Majin Buu again. Piccolo continues training Goten and Trunks to fuse. Majin Buu happens upon a blind kid named Tommy, who doesn't seem to be scared of him. Majin Buu restores the kid's vision, but to his surprise, the child is not afraid of him. He is grateful that Majin Buu made him see, and considers Majin Buu a friend. Majin Buu seems to like friendship more than fear.
| 250 | 235 | "You're Kidding, Right!? The Z-Sword is Broken" / "Out From the Broken Sword"; Transliteration: "Uso daro!? Zetto Sōdo ga Orechatta" (Japanese: ウソだろ!?ゼットソードが折れちゃった) | Kazuhito Kikuchi | Masashi Kubota | Yukio Ebisawa | December 14, 1994 | May 21, 2002 (Ocean) October 7, 2002 (FUNimation) |
Goku throws a giant boulder at Gohan to test his abilities with the Z Sword. Gohan makes a clean cut, so the Supreme Kai conjures up a block of the hardest metal in the universe called 'Katchin'. This time, the sword can't cut it, and breaks under the pressure. But from out of the Z Sword comes Old Kai, who is fifteen generations older than Supreme Kai. In exchange for a date with Bulma, Old Kai agrees to awaken Gohan's sleeping powers. He starts to do a strange dance in circles around the Saiyan, and says that it will take 5 hours to awaken his sleeping power. Meanwhile, Goten and Trunks have finally mastered the Fusion Dance, and are ready to attempt it for real.
| 251 | 236 | "Birth of a Superhuman Warrior!! His Name is Gotenks" / "Gotenks is Born"; Transliteration: "Gattai Chōjin Tanjō!! Sono Na wa Gotenkusu" (Japanese: 合体超人誕生!!その名はゴテンクス) | Takahiro Imamura | Masashi Kubota | Shingo Ishikawa | December 21, 1994 | May 22, 2002 (Ocean) October 8, 2002 (FUNimation) |
Goten and Trunks attempt to fuse, and their first attempt yields a weird-looking fat kid with very little power. Their second attempt creates an old, emaciated weakling. Finally, the two are perfectly in sync, and make Gotenks. Piccolo tells him to wait thirty minutes for the fusion to wear off so they can try it as Super Saiyans. Gotenks thinks he's powerful enough already and takes off to find Majin Buu. He is able to get some hits in on the monster, but when Majin Buu steps up the intensity, Gotenks is no match and is easily defeated. Meanwhile, on the world of the Kais, Old Kai continues the long ceremony needed to awaken Gohan's hidden power.
| 252 | 237 | "The Final Weapon is Engaged!? Satan Will Save the Earth" / "Unlikely Friendship"; Transliteration: "Saishū Heiki Shidō!? Satan wa Chikyū o Sukuu" (Japanese: 最終兵器始動!?サタンは地球を救う) | Yamauchi Shigeyasu | Masashi Kubota | Naoaki Hōjō | January 11, 1995 | May 23, 2002 (Ocean) October 9, 2002 (FUNimation) |
Goten and Trunks heal up from their injuries. They will train the rest of the day and fight Majin Buu tomorrow at full strength. On the world of the Kais, Old Kai has finished his five-hour ritual. Now Gohan must sit and meditate for twenty more hours for his power to awaken. Back at Majin Buu's house, Hercule arrives to defeat the evil creature. He tries some tricks with poison candy and exploding video games, but they have no effect on the monster. Majin Buu decides to be friends with Hercule.
| 253 | 238 | "I've Stopped Killing!! Majin Boo's Good Boy Declaration" / "I Kill No More"; Transliteration: "Korosu no Yameta!! Majin Bū Yoi Ko Sengen" (Japanese: 殺すのやめた!!魔人ブウよい子宣言) | Mitsuo Hashimoto | Sumio Uetake | Keisuke Masunaga | January 25, 1995 | May 24, 2002 (Ocean) October 10, 2002 (FUNimation) |
Goten and Trunks successfully fuse as Super Saiyans, but once again, their ego takes over. Super Gotenks spends all of his time flying around the Earth at full speed, and by the time he decides to attack Majin Buu, his 30 minutes are up. Back at Majin Buu's house, Hercule is doing his best to please the monster. He even cooks him dinner. While away murdering people, Buu finds an injured dog and heals him. Majin Buu discovers the joys of friendship with this dog, and when Hercule tells Majin Buu that killing is bad, Majin Buu vows never to kill again. But while Majin Buu and his pet are playing fetch, two crazed gunmen shoot the dog.
