= List of Dragon Ball chapters (series) =

First tankōbon volume of Dragon Ball, released in Japan on September 10, 1985

Dragon Ball is a Japanese manga series, written and illustrated by Akira Toriyama. The story follows the adventures of Son Goku, a child who goes on a lifelong journey beginning with a quest for the seven mystical Dragon Balls. Along the way, he goes through many rigorous martial arts training regimens and educational programs, defeats a series of increasingly powerful martial artists, and becomes the top martial artist in the universe.

The series was published in individual chapters in the magazine Weekly Shōnen Jump. These chapters were collected by Shueisha in a series of 42 tankōbon volumes; the first was released on September 10, 1985, while the last one was released on August 4, 1995. In 2002, the manga was re-released in a collection of 34 kanzenban volumes, which included a slightly rewritten ending, new covers, and color artwork from its Weekly Shōnen Jump run. There have also been two anime adaptations, both produced by Toei Animation; the first, also named Dragon Ball, adapted the first 16 volumes of the manga, while the second is titled Dragon Ball Z and adapted the remaining 26.

The North American distributing company Viz Media has released all 42 volumes in English, with their version of volumes seventeen through forty-two split into a separate series named Dragon Ball Z. Both began being published in March 1998 (with a re-release of the first 10 volumes of both parts in 2003); the last volume of the first part was released on August 3, 2004, while the last one of the second part was released on June 6, 2006. The first 120 chapters of Dragon Ball were also released in individual comic book format, with the remaining chapters exclusive to the graphic novel format. In June 2008, Viz began re-releasing both "series" in a wideban format called "Viz Big Edition", which is a collection of three volumes in one. A "Collector's Edition" of volume one including a hardcover was released on November 4, 2008. In June 2013, they began releasing new 3-in-1 volumes of Dragon Ball, utilizing the Japanese kanzenban covers.

== Volume list ==
No.	Title	Original release date	English release date
1	The Monkey King (Son Goku and Friends); Son Gokū to Nakama-tachi (孫悟空と仲間たち)	September 10, 1985; 978-4-08-851831-2	March 12, 2003; 978-1-56931-920-8
001. "Bloomers and the Monkey King" (ブルマと孫悟空, Buruma to Son Gokū; lit. 'Bulma and Son Goku'); 002. "No Balls!" (球がない!!, Booru ga nai!!); 003. "Sea Monkeys" (悟空·海へ走る, Gokū · Umi e Hashiru; lit. 'Goku Running to the Sea'); 004. "They Call Him... the Turtle Hermit" (亀仙人の筋斗雲, Kamesennin no Kintoun; lit. 'Kame-Sen'nin's Kinto'un'); 005. "Oo! Oo! Oolong!" (ウーロンあらわる!!, Ūron Arawaru!!; lit. 'Oolong Appears!!'); 006. "So Long, Oolong!" (ウーロン対決孫悟空, Ūron Taiketsu Son Gokū; lit. 'Oolong versus Son Goku'); 007. "Yamcha and Pu'ar" (ヤムチャとプーアル, Yamucha to Pūaru); 008. "One, Two, Yamcha-cha!" (ヤムチャおそるべし!!, Yamucha Osorubeshi!!; lit. 'The Fearsome Yamcha!!'); 009. "Dragon Balls in Danger!!" (ドラゴンボール危うし!!, Doragon Bōru Ayaushi!!); 010. "Onward to Fry-Pan..." (強盗大策戦, Gōtō Daisakusen; lit. 'A Grand Robbery Scheme'); 011. "... And Into the Fire!" (フライパン山の牛魔王, Furaipan Yama no Gyūmaō; lit. 'Gyū-Maō of Mount Frypan')
A genius girl and a young scientist and the heir of the Capsule Corp. called Bulma meets Son Goku, a strong boy with a monkey tail and fantastic martial art skills. Seeing how strong Goku is, Bulma tells him to accompany her to search for the seven Dragon Balls, which are able to grant any wish to the one who collects them all. Goku reveals that his grandfather, Son Gohan had given him a four star dragon ball. While Bulma herself has found two dragon balls herself. Bulma takes Goku into her capsule house, where he is astonished by modern technology and female anatomy. Already having three Dragon Balls together, Goku and Bulma start traveling, and soon they meet an old man called Kame-Sen'nin who gives them the fourth Dragon Ball and Kinto'un, a cloud which Goku can fly on, as gifts for returning his turtle. Soon they get the fifth Dragon Ball after being joined by a shapeshifting pig called Oolong. While traveling in the desert, they are attacked by a powerful bandit named Yamcha and a flying cat-like animal named Pu'ar (who can also shapeshift). They soon learn about the Dragon Balls and attempt to steal them so Yamcha can have confidence in talking to girls. They later discover that the sixth Dragon Ball is in a burning castle, and its owner, Gyū-Maō the Ox-King, tells them that Kame-Sen'nin can stop the fire.
2	Wish Upon a Dragon (A Critical Moment for the Dragon Balls); Doragon Booru Kiki Ippatsu (ドラゴンボール危機一髪)	January 10, 1986; 978-4-08-851832-9	March 12, 2003; 978-1-56931-921-5
012. "In Search of Kame-Sen'nin" (亀仙人をたずねて, Kamesennin o Tazunete); 013. "Fanning the Flame" (亀仙人の芭蕉扇, Kamesennin no Bashōsen; lit. 'Kame-Sen'nin's Banshō Fan'); 014. "Kamehameha!" (亀仙人のかめはめ波!!, Kamesennin no Kamehameha!!; lit. 'Kame-Sen'nin's Kamehameha!!'); 015. "At Sixes and Sevens" (七星球発見, Chīshinchū Hakken; lit. 'Finding the Seven-Star Ball'); 016. "One Goal, One Enemy" (ウサギの耳, Usagi no Mimi; lit. 'Rabbit Ears'); 017. "Carrot Top" (オヤブンの得意技, Oyabun no Tokui Waza; lit. 'The Foster Parent's Special Skill'); 018. "Who's Got My Balls?!" (D.B.奪われる!!, Doragon Bōru Ubawareru!!; lit. 'The Dragon Balls Are Stolen!!'); 019. "At Last... the Dragon!" (ついに龍あらわる!, Tsui ni Doragon Arawaru!); 020. "Just One Wish!!" (神龍への願い!!, Shenron e no Negai!!; lit. 'The Wish to Shenlong!!'); 021. "Full Moon" (満月, Mangetsu); 022. "The End of the Tale" (悟空の大変身, Gokū no Daihenshin; lit. 'Goku's Great Transformation'); 023. "Separate Ways" (ドラゴンチーム解散, Doragon Chīmu Kaisan; lit. 'The Dragon Team Separates'); 024. "The High Price of Education" (亀仙人の修業料, Kamesennin no Shugyou Ryou; lit. 'The Price of Kame-Sen'nin's Training')
Goku finds Gyū-Maō's daughter, Chi-Chi, and goes with her to Kame-Sen'nin's house. Kame-Sen'nin agrees to put out the fire and uses a powerful energy blast called Kamehameha to do it, and thus find the sixth Dragon Ball, despite blowing away the castle. Later, soldiers of Pilaf steal Bulma's Dragon Balls. Yamcha helps them to enter Pilaf's castle but they are trapped in a room. With the seven Dragon Balls reunited, Pilaf summons the dragon Shenlong who would grant his wish of conquering the world, but Oolong interrupts him by wishing for a girl's panties, making the Balls and the dragon disappear. Angered, Pilaf traps Goku and his friends in an unbreakable room, but Goku looks at the full moon, mysteriously causing him to transform into a rampage Great Ape that destroys the castle. Yamcha and Pu'ar manage to cut his tail off and Goku returns to being a child without knowing what happened. Goku separates from his friends and goes to train with Kame-Sen'nin, who tells him that he must bring a girl to act as a housewife if he wants to train.
3	The Training of Kame-sen'nin (The Tenka'ichi Budōkai Begins!!); Tenkaichi Budōkai Hajimaru!! (天下一武道会はじまる！！)	June 10, 1986; 978-4-08-851833-6	March 12, 2003; 978-1-56931-922-2
025. "A Rival Arrives!!" (ライバル?参上!!, Raibaru? Sanjō!!; lit. 'A Rival? Arrival!!'); 026. "Who's That Girl?!" (?な女の子, Fushigi na Onna no Ko; lit. 'The Peculiar Girl'); 027. "Nothing to Sneeze At" (ランチのクシャミ, Ranchi no Kushami; lit. 'Lunch's Sneeze'); 028. "Let the Training Begin!" (修業はじまり!!, Shugyō Hajimari!!; lit. 'The Training Begins!!'); 029. "Bad Day at Turtle Rock" (亀マークの石さがし, Kame Māku no Ishi Sagashi; lit. 'Search for the Turtle-Marked Stone'); 030. "Milk Run" (牛乳配達, Gyūnyū Haitatsu); 031. "It Only Gets Harder" (亀仙流の厳しい修業, Kamesenryū no Kibishī Shugyō; lit. 'The Kame-sen School's Tough Training'); 032. "Let the Contest Begin!!" (天下一武道会はじまる!!, Tenkaichi Budōkai Hajimaru!!; lit. 'The Tenka'ichi Budōkai Begins!!'); 033. "Hard Work Pays!!" (修業の威力!!, Shugyō no Iryoku!!; lit. 'The Power of Training!!'); 034. "Strongest Under the Heavens!" (天下無敵!, Tenka Muteki!); 035. "The Battle is Set!!" (対戦決定!!, Taisen Kettei!!; lit. 'The Competition is Decided!!'); 036. "Match No. 1" (第1試合, Daīchi Shiai)
A bald monk named Kuririn makes his way to Kame-Sen'nin's island, and he demands training too. With him, Goku rescues a thief named Lunch to take her to Kame-Sen'nin's house, so that he agrees to start the training. Kame-Sen'nin gives them strange methods to train such as running through jungles, finding rocks or delivering milk all across the island. Kame-Sen'nin continually makes the training harder by having the two wear a 2-ton turtle shell. After finishing their training, Kame-Sen'nin takes them to the Tenka'ichi Budōkai, which is a fighting tournament that reunites the strongest warriors from the planet. Goku and Kuririn easily win their first fights and manage to enter the finals. Kuririn fights against Bacterian (バクテリアン, Bakuterian), a fat man who uses disgusting tactics to fight, such as his strong smell and flatulence, but Kuririn manages to defeat him by his own methods.
4	Strongest Under the Heavens (The Grand Finals); Daikesshōsen (大決勝戦)	October 9, 1986; 978-4-08-851834-3	March 12, 2003; 978-1-56931-923-9
037. "Match No. 2" (第2試合, Daini Shiai); 038. "Water and Cheesecake" (第3試合, Daisan Shiai; lit. 'Match No. 3'); 039. "Monster Smash" (第4試合, Daiyon Shiai; lit. 'Match No. 4'); 040. "The Tail of Goku" (悟空のシッポ, Gokū no Shippo); 041. "Kuririn vs. Jackie Chun" (クリリン対ジャッキー·チュン, Kuririn Tai Jakkī Chun); 042. "The Big Fight" (大攻防戦!, Daikōbōsen!); 043. "The Mysterious Jackie Chun" (謎のジャッキー·チュン, Nazo no Jakkī Chun); 044. "The Name of the Game is Namu" (孫悟空対ナム, Son Gokū Tai Namu; lit. 'Son Goku vs Namu'); 045. "Taking the Air" (大空中戦!, Daikūchūsen!; lit. 'A Great Mid-Air Battle!'); 046. "The Final Match" (大決勝戦, Daikesshōsen); 047. "The Kamehameha" (かめはめ波, Kamehameha); 048. "One Lucky Monkey" (猿マネ孫悟空, Saru Mane Son Gokū; lit. 'Monkey Imitating Son Goku')
In the next match, Yamcha is easily defeated by an old man named Jackie Chun, who is Kame-Sen'nin in disguise. After that, a man from a village suffering from a drought named Namu (ナム) beats a girl named Ran Fuan (ランファン, Ran Fan), who uses striptease as an attack. Goku then defeats a dinosaur called Giran (ギラン), after a prolonged battle in which Goku's tail reappears and Giran surrenders. In the first semifinal, Kuririn faces Jackie Chun, and is defeated as he is easily surpassed at speed. In the second semifinal, Goku fights against Namu and both use techniques to fight in the air. Namu loses, but Kame-Sen'nin helps him bring back water to help the drought, while also telling him that he entered the contest so his students wouldn't win and become overconfident in life. Then, the final match between Goku and Jackie starts. The two exchange attacks, and the match leans heavily towards Goku's favor.
5	The Red Ribbon Army (The Terror of Muscle Tower); Massuru Tawā no Kyōfu (マッスルタワーの恐怖)	January 9, 1987; 978-4-08-851835-0	March 12, 2003; 978-1-56931-924-6
049. "The Big Sleep" (武天老師の逆襲, Jakkī Chun no Gyakushū; lit. 'Jackie Chun's Counterattack'); 050. "Jackie's Shocking Secret" (悟空最大のピンチ!!, Gokū Saidai no Pinchi!!; lit. 'Goku's Greatest Pinch!!'); 051. "And the Crowd Goes Wild!!" (天下一武道会大騒然, Tenkaichi Budōkai Daisōzen; lit. 'Great Confusion at the Tenka'ichi Budōkai'); 052. "The Climax Approaches!" (クライマックス近し!!, Kuraimakkusu Chikashi!!); 053. "The Final Blow" (クライマックス, Kuraimakkusu; lit. 'The Climax'); 054. "On the Road Again" (再冒険!!, Saibōken!!; lit. 'Another Adventure!!'); 055. "The Red Ribbon" (赤いリボン, Akai Ribon); 056. "The Dragon Ball Scramble" (ドラゴンボール争奪戦, Doragon Bōru Sōdatsusen); 057. "The Storming of Muscle Tower" (マッスルタワー突撃!!, Massuru Tawā Totsugeki!!); 058. "The Flexing of Muscle Tower" (マッスルタワーの恐怖, Massuru Tawā no Kyōfu; lit. 'The Terror of Muscle Tower'); 059. "Devil on the Third Floor" (3階の悪魔!!, Sankai no Akuma!!); 060. "Purple People Beater" (忍者ムラサキ!!, Ninja Murasaki!!)
During the fight, Goku sees the full moon and he once again turns into a Great Ape. As Goku gets wildly out of control, Jackie performs his Max Power Kamehameha technique to destroy the moon. Goku returns to his human state and as he wakes up, the fight continues and Goku uses his kamehameha. With both fighters being tired, they are only to perform a few moves, and Jackie wins the tournament when the two exchange kicks because his kick struck deeper than Goku's. Goku decides to search for the Dragon Ball that his grandfather left to him and leaves. However, Goku gets lost and is attacked by villains from the Red Ribbon Army organization, and appears frozen in a snow village. He is rescued by a family, and as he discovers that the Red Ribbon has kidnapped the mayor, Goku goes to the Muscle Tower base to stop them. He defeats the legendary robot Full Metal Jacket, and fights Sergeant Major Purple, who tries to hide from Goku by using subtle techniques.
6	Bulma Returns! (Bulma's Big Mistake!!); Buruma no Daishippai!! (ブルマの大失敗!!)	March 10, 1987; 978-4-08-851836-7	March 12, 2003; 978-1-56931-925-3
061. "The 4½ Tatami Mat Flip" (忍法! 四畳半タタミ返し!!, Ninpō! Yonjōhan Tatamigaeshi!!; lit. 'Ninja Arts! The 4½ Tatami Counter!!'); 062. "The Ninja Split!" (危機!分身の術, Kiki! Bunshin no Jutsu; lit. 'Danger! The Art of Division'); 063. "Mechanical Man No. 8" (人造人間8号, Jinzōningen Hachigō; lit. 'Artificial Human No. 8'); 064. "The Horrible... Jiggler!" (5階戦慄のブヨン, Gokai Senritsu no Buyon; lit. 'Floor Five: The Hair-Raising Buyon'); 065. "How to Unjiggle a Jiggler" (ブヨン攻略法, Buyon Kōryakuhō; lit. 'How to Defeat Buyon'); 066. "Muscle Tower's Final Hour" (マッスルタワーの最後!!, Massuru Tawā no Saigo!!); 067. "Go West, Young Goku..." (西へ..., Nishi e...; lit. 'To the West...'); 068. "Monkey in the City" (西の都のブルマんち, Nishi no Miyako no Buruma n chi; lit. 'Bulma's House in West City'); 069. "Bulma and Goku" (ブルマと悟空part2, Buruma to Gokū Pāto Tsū; lit. 'Bulma and Goku, Part 2'); 070. "Bulma's Big Mistake!!" (ブルマの大失敗!!, Buruma no Daishippai!!); 071. "The Turtle is Spotted!" (KAME HOUSE 発見さる!!, Kame Hausu Hakken Saru!!; lit. 'Kame House Discovered!!'); 072. "The Blue Meanies" (ブルー将軍攻撃開始, Burū Shōgun Kōgeki Kaishi; lit. 'General Blue Launches His Attack')
As Purple is defeated by Goku, he awakes the Mechanical Man #8 to kill Goku, but the android negates to attack him. Instead, Goku and #8 become friends and both find the leader Colonel White, who traps them in the bottom of the tower with a monster called the Jiggler. Goku beats the Jiggler using the low temperatures, and they go to General White again. As White shoots Goku, #8 furiously knocks White. Seeing that the Dragon Ball's radar is broken, Goku goes to the West City to ask to Bulma to fix it. Bulma decides to join Goku and discovers the Dragon Ball is under the water. Kame-Sen'nin gives them a submarine to search for the Dragon Ball and Kuririn joins them, while General Blue of the Red Ribbon and his men start to chase Goku and company.
7	General Blue and the Pirate Treasure (Pursuit!! General Blue); Tsuiseki!! Burū Shōgun (追跡！！ブルー将軍)	May 8, 1987; 978-4-08-851837-4	March 12, 2003; 978-1-56931-926-0
073. "The Wrong Turtle to Mess With" (ブルー将軍の誤算, Burū Shōgun no Gosan; lit. 'General Blue's Miscalculation'); 074. "The Pirates' Trap" (海賊たちの罠, Kaizokutachi no Wana); 075. "Robot in Waiting!" (海賊港の伏兵, Kaizoku Minato no Fukuhei; lit. 'Ambush in the Pirate Harbor'); 076. "The Treasure!" (お宝発見, Otakara Hakken; lit. 'The Treasure is Discovered'); 077. "Bright Blue's Eyes" (光るブルーの眼, Hikaru Burū no Me); 078. "The Great Escape" (大脱出!!, Daidasshutsu!!); 079. "Run, Run, Run!!" (逃げろや逃げろ!!, Nigero ya Nigero!!); 080. "The Three Stolen Dragon Balls" (奪われた3個の龍球, Ubawareta Sanko no Doragon Bōru); 081. "Chased to Penguin Village!" (追ってペンギン村!, Otte Pengin Mura!); 082. "The Broken Dragon Radar" (こわれたドラゴンレーダー, Kowareta Doragon Reidā); 083. "The Stolen Dragon Radar" (奪われたドラゴンレーダー, Ubawareta Doragon Reidā); 084. "The Karin Sanctuary" (聖地カリンの親子, Seichi Karin no Oyako; lit. 'Father and Son of the Karin Holy Land')
Goku, Bulma and Kuririn find a pirate's dungeon under the sea and enter to find the Dragon Ball. Goku encounters a pirate robot and a giant octopus, but General Blue confuses him with false information separating him from his friends. After destroying its traps, they are attacked by General Blue, who wants to steal the treasure from the dungeon. As they fight, the dungeon starts collapsing and they escape. Goku finds a Dragon Ball, but as they return to Kame-Sen'nin's, General Blue steals the Ball and Goku follows him. At some point, Goku and Blue appear in Penguin Village from the Dr. Slump series. As Goku loses Blue, he meets a girl robot Arale, who takes him with her creator to repair the radar which has been broken again. Blue steals the radar but he is then easily defeated by Arale. Goku is given a new radar and goes to Karin Sanctuary where the next Ball is located. However, two Native Americans, Bora (ボラ) and Upa (ウパ), already have the ball.
8	Taopaipai and Master Karin (Son Goku's Assault); Son Gokū Totsugeki (孫悟空突撃)	July 10, 1987; 978-4-08-851838-1	May 7, 2003; 978-1-56931-927-7
085. "Taopaipai the Assassin" (殺し屋゛桃白白゛, Koroshiya 'Taopaipai'); 086. "The Devastating Dodon-Pa!!!" (桃白白の必殺どどん波, Taopaipai no Hissatsu Dodonpa; lit. 'Taopaipai's Devastating Dodonpa'); 087. "The Great Climb" (カリン塔, Karin Tō; lit. 'Karin Tower'); 088. "Sage of the Karin Tower" (カリン塔のカリン様, Karin Tō no Karinsama; lit. 'Karin-sama of Karin Tower'); 089. "A Drink of Water" (超聖水の効能, Chōseisui no Kōnō; lit. 'The Effects of the Super Holy Water'); 090. "Son Goku Strikes Back!" (孫悟空の逆襲, Son Gokū no Gyakushū); 091. "Battle in the Sanctuary!!" (聖地の大決戦!!, Seichi no Daikessen!!); 092. "Taopaipai at the Brink" (最後の桃白白, Saigo no Taopaipai; lit. 'The End of Taopaipai'); 093. "Goku's Charge" (孫悟空突撃, Son Gokū Totsugeki; lit. 'Son Goku's Assault'); 094. "Attack From the Sky!" (孫悟空快進撃!, Son Gokū Kaishingeki!; lit. 'Son Goku's Charge!'); 095. "The Fall of Commander Red" (レッド総帥死す!, Reddo Sōsui Shisu!; lit. 'Commander Red Dies!'); 096. "The Triumph!" (大勝利!!, Daishōri!!)
In Karin Sanctuary, Goku befriends the two Native Americans, Bora and Upa, who gift him the four-star Dragon Ball, which his grandfather originally gave to Goku. The Red Ribbon sends the professional assassin Taopaipai to kill Goku. Once finding Goku, Taopaipai kills Bora and easily defeats Goku to the point where he thinks he died. After Goku recovers, he decides to revive Bora, but as he first needs to defeat Taopaipai, he climbs the Karin Tower to meet its hermit so he can become stronger. There he meets Karin, a cat that trains him by saying that the water he has can make him stronger. In the end, Karin reveals that it was just a joke to make Goku train harder. After a few days, Goku easily defeats Taopaipai and goes to the Red Ribbon base, demolishing its security. When Adjutant Black tells Commander Red he needs to abandon the base, it is revealed that the only reason Red wanted the Dragon Balls was to become tall. Angered at this, Black fires a pistol into Red's head, killing him. After several fights, Goku destroys the Red Ribbon and gets six Dragon Balls.
9	Test of the All-Seeing Crone (When Worried, See Baba Uranai); Komatta Toki no Uranai Baba (こまったときの占いババ)	September 10, 1987; 978-4-08-851839-8	May 7, 2003; 978-1-56931-928-4
097. "The Lost Dragon Ball" (最後の龍球, Saigo no Doragon Bōru; lit. 'The Final Dragon Ball'); 098. "The All-Seeing Crone" (占いババ, Uranai Baba); 099. "The Five Champions" (5人の戦士, Gonin no Senshi); 100. "Battle of the Bleeders" (大流血戦, Dairyūketsusen; lit. 'A Great Bloody Battle'); 101. "The Devil's Cesspool" (悪魔の便所, Akuma no Benjo; lit. 'The Devil's Toilet'); 102. "Goku at the Plate!" (孫悟空見参, Son Gokū Kenzan; lit. 'Son Goku Steps Up'); 103. "The Power of Goku" (孫悟空強し!!, Son Gokū Tsuyoshi!!); 104. "The Beam of Evil" (アクマイト光線, Akumaitokōsen; lit. 'The Devilmite Beam'); 105. "The Last Champion" (5人目の男, Gonin Me no Otoko; lit. 'The Fifth Man'); 106. "Strong vs. Strong" (強敵同士, Kyōteki Dōshi; lit. 'Equally Strong Opponents'); 107. "To Win by a Tail" (悟空のシッポ, Gokū no Shippo; lit. 'Goku's Tail'); 108. "Son Gohan" (孫悟飯, Son Gohan)
When reuniting with his friends, Bulma tells Goku that the last Dragon Ball is impossible to find for unknown reasons and Kame-Sen'nin tells him that his sister, Baba Uranai, can find the Ball. Goku, Yamcha, Kuririn and Pu'ar meet Baba Uranai who explains them that they have to beat her five warriors in order to explain where is the ball, unless they have one million dollars. Pu'ar and Upa defeat Count Dracula by making signs of vampires's weaknesses, and then Yamcha defeats the Invisible Man by using Kame-Sen'nin's nosebleed to reveal him. The next fighter is the Mummy, who defeats Yamcha but he is later defeated by Goku, who then defeats the Devil. The Devil uses his beam to make the evil in Goku's heart explode, but the attack fails when it is revealed that Goku has no evil in his heart. He has the last fight against a masked old man, who is Goku's deceased grandfather, Son Gohan. After a prolonged fight, Gohan gives up confessing he wanted to see his grandson. The two share an emotional moment, and then Gohan returns to the afterlife. Meanwhile, Pilaf plots on taking the Dragon Balls.
10	Return to the Tournament (The 22nd Tenka'ichi Budōkai); Dainijūnikai Tenkaichi Budōkai (第22回天下一武道会)	November 10, 1987; 978-4-08-851840-4	May 7, 2003; 978-1-56931-929-1
109. "A Second Helping of Pilaf" (ピラフ一味の再挑戦, Pirafu Ichimi no Saichōsen; lit. 'The Pilaf Gang's Second Challenge'); 110. "The Pilaf Machine" (ピラフの大作戦, Pirafu no Daisakusen; lit. 'Pilaf's Great Strategy'); 111. "Reenter the Dragon" (神龍再び!!, Shenron Futatabi!!; lit. 'Once Again, Shenlong!!'); 112. "Go, Goku, Go!" (駆けろ!孫悟空, Kakero! Son Gokū; lit. 'Run! Son Goku'); 113. "Return to the Tournament" (第22回天下一武道会, Dainijūnikai Tenkaichi Budōkai; lit. 'The 22nd Tenka'ichi Budōkai'); 114. "The Qualifying Rounds" (予選サバイバル, Yosen Sabaibaru; lit. 'Preliminary Survival'); 115. "King Chappa" (予選サバイバルその2, Yosen Sabaibaru Sono Ni; lit. 'Preliminary Survival, Chapter 2'); 116. "The Doctored Lottery" (つくられた対戦表, Tsukurareta Taisenhyō; lit. 'The Competition Chart is Drawn Up'); 117. "Yamcha's Kamehameha!" (ヤムチャのかめはめ波, Yamucha no Kamehameha); 118. "The Cruelty of Tenshinhan" (ヤムチャ破れる!!, Yamucha Yabureru!!; lit. 'Yamucha's Beaten'); 119. "The Full Moon Grudge" (満月の恨み, Mangetsu no Urami); 120. "Look Out! The Dodon Blast!" (なんとどどん波, Nanto Dodonpa; lit. 'What, Dodonpa')
As a reward for defeating the five warriors, Baba Uranai tells the location of the last Dragon Ball and Goku goes to find it. He confronts Pilaf and his soldiers, and after defeating them Goku gets their Dragon Ball. Goku then summons Shenlong and wishes to revive Bora. Three years later, Goku reunites with his friends and enters the new Tenka'ichi Budōkai. He also meets Kame-Sen'nin's rival, Tsuru-Sen'nin, the Crane Hermit, who has taken his two students to fight. The first match is between Yamcha and the Crane Hermit's student, Tenshinhan. After a violent fight, Tenshinhan breaks Yamcha's left leg and wins. Yamcha is taken to the hospital with life-threatening injuries. In the second match Jackie Chun easily defeats the "Man-Wolf" (男狼, Otoko Ōkami) and in the third, Kuririn faces the Crane Hermit's student, Chaozu. As both use their techniques, Goku discovers that the Crane Hermit is Taopaipai's brother and the Crane Hermit wants to take revenge for Taopaipai's murder.
11	The Eyes of Tenshinhan (The World's Greatest Super Battle!!); Tenkaichi no Sūpā Batoru!! (天下一のスーパーバトル！！)	February 10, 1988; 978-4-08-851608-0	May 7, 2003; 978-1-56931-919-2
121. "Kuririn's Master Plan" (クリリンの大作戦, Kuririn no Daisakusen); 122. "Goku vs. Panpoot" (孫悟空参上!!!, Son Gokū Sanjō!!!; lit. 'Here's Son Goku!!!'); 123. "Tenshinhan vs. Jackie Chun" (実力伯仲!!, Jitsuryoku Hakuchū!!; lit. 'Evenly Matched!!'); 124. "Young Tenshinhan" (若き天津飯, Wakaki Tenshinhan); 125. "Goku vs. Kuririn" (孫悟空対クリリン!!, Son Gokū Tai Kuririn!!); 126. "Goku vs. Kuririn, Part 2" (孫悟空強し!!, Son Gokū Tsuyoshi!!; lit. 'Son Goku's So Strong!!'); 127. "Goku vs. Kuririn, Part 3" (クリリンの作戦、悟空の作戦, Kuririn no Sakusen, Gokū no Sakusen; lit. 'Kuririn's Strategy, Goku's Strategy'); 128. "Goku vs. Tenshinhan" (天下一のスーパーバトル!!, Tenkaichi no Sūpā Batoru!!; lit. 'The World's Greatest Super Battle!!'); 129. "The Volleyball Play" (排球拳と戦闘パワー, Haikyūken to Sentō Pawā; lit. 'The Haikyū-ken and Fighting Power'); 130. "The Fist of the Sun" (天津飯あせる!, Tenshinhan Aseru!; lit. 'Tenshinhan Feels the Heat!'); 131. "Tsuru-Sen'nin" (天津飯、苦悩!, Tenshinhan, Kunō!; lit. 'Tenshinhan, in Anguish!'); 132. "The Arms Race" (鶴仙人の怨念気功砲!!, Tsurusennin no Onnen Kikōhō!!; lit. 'Tsuru-Sen'nin's Curse, the Kikōhō!!')
Kuririn manages to defeat Chaozu by his lack of knowledge in math, and then Goku easily defeats his opponent, the eight-time champion Panpoot (パンプット, Panputto). The semifinal starts between Tenshinhan and Jackie Chun. Impressed by Tenshinhan's abilities, Jackie gives up telling him that he could use his powers for good, and later reveals his true identity to him. In the other semifinal, Goku faces Kuririn, and the former wins. The finals start and Goku fights against Tenshinhan. Both fight at the same level, but as Goku takes advantage, Chaozu is commanded by Tsuru-Sen'nin to paralyze him. Tenshinhan tells Chaozu not to do it and Kame-Sen'nin attacks Tsuru-Sen'nin, kicking him out of the contest. Tenshinhan and Chaozu decide to give up on the Crane Hermit's evil ways, and Tenshinhan gives up on his dream of becoming the greatest assassin. The two begin to fight fairly.
12	The Demon King Piccolo (The Terror of Piccolo Daimao!); Pikkoro Daimaō no Kyōfu! (ピッコロ大魔王の恐怖！)	April 8, 1988; 978-4-08-851609-7	September 3, 2003; 978-1-59116-155-4
133. "Desperation Move" (両者最後の戦術!!, Ryōsha Saigo no Senjutsu!!; lit. 'The Pair's Final Tactics!!'); 134. "Up in the Air" (武道大会終了!そして..., Budō Taikai Shūryō! Soshite...; lit. 'The Martial Arts Tournament Concludes! And Then...'); 135. "The Death of Kuririn" (クリリンの死そして恐ろしき陰謀, Kuririn no Shi Soshite Osoroshiki Inbō; lit. 'Kuririn's Death, and a Terrible Conspiracy'); 136. "Target: Tenka'ichi Budōkai" (ピッコロ大魔王の恐怖!, Pikkoro Daimaō no Kyōfu!; lit. 'The Terror of Piccolo Daimaō!'); 137. "We Need You, Goku!" (よみがえれ孫悟空!, Yomigaere Son Gokū!); 138. "The Weirdo with the Ball" (ボールを持った妙なやつ, Bōru o Motta Myō na Yatsu); 139. "Yajirobe's Prey" (ヤジロベーの獲物, Yajirobei no Emono); 140. "The Martial Artist Hunters" (タンバリンがやってくる!, Tambarin ga Yatte Kuru!; lit. 'Tambourine Draws Near!'); 141. "Goku vs. Tambourine" (孫悟空爆発!!, Son Gokū Bakuhatsu!!; lit. 'Son Goku's Explosion!!'); 142. "Piccolo Descends!" (ピッコロ大魔王降り立つ!!, Pikkoro Daimaō Oritatsu!!); 143. "Goku vs. The Demon King" (孫悟空対ピッコロ大魔王, Son Gokū Tai Pikkoro Daimaō); 144. "Goku... Loses?" (孫悟空完敗!!, Son Gokū Kanpai!!; lit. 'Son Goku Completely Defeated!!'); Ask Akira Toriyama
Tenshinhan destroys the battle arena using his kikōhō technique, and both continue fighting in the air. The first person who falls from the air will lose, and it seems that Tenshinhan will win, due to his levitation technique. As Goku is about to win, he is hit by a truck and falls first, making Tenshinhan win the tournament. Later, Goku finds Kuririn dead and immediately goes to find the murderer by searching the Dragon Ball he stole from Kuririn. Kame-Sen'nin discovers that the planner of the murder is a powerful demon called the Demon King Piccolo. Goku finds Kuririn's assassin, an offspring from King Piccolo named Tambourine, but he is unable to defeat as he is very tired. As Goku recovers, he meets a swordsman named Yajirobe who hates Goku due to stealing his fish, and they both start killing King Piccolo's offspring. They are then confronted by King Piccolo and Goku faces him. Goku is unable to inflict him any damage and is defeated, but Yajirobe escapes with him.
13	Piccolo Conquers the Earth (Son Goku's Counterattack!?); Son Gokū no Gyakushū!? (孫悟空の逆襲！？)	June 10, 1988; 978-4-08-851610-3	November 19, 2003; 978-1-59116-148-6
145. "The Muten-Rōshi's Decision" (武天老師の決心, Mutenrōshi no Kesshin); 146. "The Mafū-Ba" (亀仙人最後の魔封波!!, Kamesennin Saigo no Mafūba!!; lit. 'Kame-Sen'nin's Final Mafūba!!'); 147. "The Demon King of Old... Restored!" (若がえるか!?ピッコロ大魔王, Waka Gaeru ka!? Pikkoro Daimaō; lit. 'Youth Restored!? Piccolo Daimaō'); 148. "Go Ask Karin!" (カリン塔に会え!!, Karin Tō ni Ae!!; lit. 'Get to Karin Tower!!'); 149. "World Domination" (世界征服, Sekai Seifuku); 150. "Karin's Quandary" (カリン様もなやむ, Karinsama mo Nayamu; lit. 'Even Karin-sama is Worried'); 151. "The Superest Super Water!!!" (超神水!!!, Chōshinsui!!!; lit. 'The Super God Water!!!'); 152. "Piccolo's World" (孫悟空ついに発進!!!!, Son Gokū Tsui ni Hasshin!!!!; lit. 'Son Goku Finally Departs!!!!'); 153. "Tenshinhan's Decision!!" (天津飯の決意!!, Tenshinhan no Ketsui!!); 154. "Tenshinhan vs. Drum" (天津飯の誤算, Tenshinhan no Gosan; lit. 'Tenshinhan's Miscalculation'); 155. "Guess Who's Back?" (孫悟空の逆襲, Son Gokū no Gyakushū; lit. 'Son Goku's Counterattack'); 156. "Fury" (怒る!!, Ikaru!!)
Kame-Sen'nin tracks down King Piccolo and decides that he will risk his life to kill him. Using the forbidden Mafū-ba technique, Kame-Sen'nin tries to imprison Piccolo in a rice cooker, but misses and dies. King Piccolo summons Shenlong and wishes to become young again, after killing Chaozu who tried to interrupt him. As he regains his youth, King Piccolo starts conquering the world by defeating the King of the World's army, while Tambourine is commanded to kill Namu and Giran. Meanwhile, Yajirobe takes Goku to the Karin Tower to heal him, and Karin makes him drink a sacred water that is rumored to be poisoned to make him stronger. Goku risks his life to drink the poisoned water, but he lives. Tenshinhan tries to seal King Piccolo like Kame-Sen'nin, but fails and is defeated by his offspring, Drum. Goku arrives and kills Drum. He then faces Piccolo and manages to overpower him.
14	Heaven and Earth (Even More Action); Sara Naru Hiyaku (さらなる飛躍)	August 10, 1988; 978-4-08-851611-0	February 18, 2004; 978-1-59116-169-1
157. "The Immortal Battle" (不死身の決戦!!, Fujimi no Kessen!!); 158. "Goku's Greatest Crisis!" (孫悟空最大の危機!!, Son Gokū Saidai no Kiki!!); 159. "The Blasted Earth" (荒野の大格闘!!, Kōya no Daikakutō!!; lit. 'A Grand Battle in the Wasteland!!'); 160. "Goku's Final Gamble" (孫悟空最後の賭け!!, Son Gokū Saigo no Kake!!); 161. "The Fist of Son Goku" (孫悟空勝つ!!, Son Gokū Katsu!!; lit. 'Son Goku Wins!!'); 162. "The Nyoi-bō's Secret" (如意棒の秘密, Nyoibō no Himitsu); 163. "The Heaven of Kami-sama" (神殿, Shinden; lit. 'The Temple'); 164. "Enter God" (神様登場, Kamisama Tōjō; lit. 'Kami-sama Appears'); 165. "Shen Long Resurrected!" (神龍復活!!, Shenron Fukkatsu!!); 166. "The Reunion" (それぞれの再会, Sorezore no Saikai); 167. "New Challengers" (波乱の天下一武道会, Haran no Tenkaichi Budōkai; lit. 'Trouble at the Tenka'ichi Budōkai'); 168. "The 8 Finalists" (8勝者決定!!, Hasshōsha Kettei!!)
Goku continues facing King Piccolo, and Goku used the Great Ape Fist to punch a hole through his abdomen, but King Piccolo makes a son, who is also known as Piccolo. Goku is then rescued by Yajirobe who takes him to Karin Sanctuary. Karin tells him that Shenlong was destroyed by King Piccolo, but its creator, God, is able to restore him. Goku ascends the Karin Tower and arrives the Sacred Temple to meet up with God. First he meets Mr. Popo, God's assistant, and it is revealed that Mr. Popo is stronger than Goku, so he cannot see God. Angry, Goku demands training to see God, but Mr. Popo lets Goku see God due to his persistence. "God" is better known as Kami-sama, who is revealed to be King Piccolo's good side and agrees to revive Shenlong, so that it could revive the ones who were killed by King Piccolo. Mr. Popo remolds him, and Kuririn, Chaozu, Kame-Sen'nin, Namu and Giran get revived. However, Goku tells Kami to train him, so that he can defeat King Piccolo's last offspring who was born before he died. Three years later, a taller Goku reunites with his friends to participate in the new Tenka'ichi Budōkai. An unknown woman comes out and punches Goku for forgetting his promise. Then, the eight best start, including Goku, Kuririn, Piccolo, the anonymous girl, Tenshinhan, a newly-constructed Taopaipai, Yamcha, and Shen.
15	The Titanic Tournament (Rivals Standing Their Ground!); Gunyū Kakkyo! (群雄割拠！)	December 6, 1988; 978-4-08-851612-7	May 19, 2004; 978-1-59116-297-1
169. "Tenshinhan vs Taopaipai" (天津飯と桃白白, Tenshinhan to Taopaipai); 170. "The Assassin's Struggles" (殺し屋桃白白のあがき, Koroshiya Taopaipai no Agaki; lit. 'The Assassin Taopaipai's Struggles'); 171. "Goku Gets Married!" (孫悟空の結婚, Son Gokū no Kekkon; lit. 'Son Goku's Marriage'); 172. "Kuririn vs. Demon Junior" (クリリン対マジュニア, Kuririn Tai Ma Junia); 173. "Kuririn vs. Demon Junior, Part 2" (クリリン対マジュニア勝負決す!!, Kuririn Tai Ma Junia Shōbu Kessu!!; lit. 'Kuririn vs Demon Junior: Settling the Score!!'); 174. "Yamcha vs. Shen" (ヤムチャ対シェン, Yamucha Tai Shen); 175. "Shen" (シェン, Shen); 176. "Goku vs. Tenshinhan" (孫悟空VS天津飯, Son Gokū Bāsesu Tenshinhan); 177. "Goku vs. Tenshinhan, Part 2" (スピード, Supīdo; lit. 'Speed'); 178. "Tenshinhan's Secret Move!" (天津飯自信の必殺技!, Tenshinhan Jishin no Hissatsu Waza!; lit. 'Tenshinhan's Prided Surefire Technique!'); 179. "The Two Weak Points" (ふたつの弱点, Futatsu no Jakuten); 180. "Kami-sama vs. the Demon King" (ピッコロ大魔王対神様, Pikkoro Daimaō Tai Kamisama)
In the first fight, Teshinhan fights and defeats his mentor Taopaipai as a cyborg, whom he is disappointed by his desire to kill. Taopaipai cuts Tenshinhan with a knife in order to kill him, getting disqualified and then subdued by his opponent. In the second fight, Goku easily defeats Chi-Chi, the unknown woman, who was angry that he did not recognize her, and so Goku agrees to marry her as she asked him in their childhood. In the next fight, Kuririn faces Piccolo, and as the latter surpasses him, Kuririn gives up and loses. In the fourth match, Yamcha fights against a man called Shen, who is really Kami possessing him. Yamcha loses and the semifinal between Goku and Tenshinhan starts. Tenshinhan uses a new technique to divide his body in four. However, Goku discovers that his power was also divided and manages to defeat him. The second semifinal starts, and Kami fights against his evil self, Piccolo, who is revealed to be Demon Junior.
16 (Note: Chapters 193-194 were included in the Japanese release of volume 17, which was published in English as the first volume of Dragon Ball Z.)	Goku vs. Piccolo (The Dragon and Tiger Mutually Strike!); Ryūko Aiutsu! (龍虎相討つ！)	February 10, 1989; 978-4-08-851613-4	August 3, 2004; 978-1-59116-457-9
181. "God's Miscalculation" (神の誤算, Kami no Gosan); 182. "The Fated Showdown!" (因縁の対決!悟空対ピッコロ, Innen no Taiketsu! Son Gokū Tai Pikkoro; lit. 'The Fated Showdown! Son Goku vs Piccolo'); 183. "Testing the Waters" (小手調べ, Kote Shirabe); 184. "The Real Fight" (両者真剣勝負, Ryōsha Shinken Shōbu; lit. 'Both Sides Go All-Out'); 185. "The Super Kamehameha" (超かめはめ波, Chōkamehameha); 186. "Panic at the Tenka'ichi Budōkai!" (武道会場騒然!!, Budōkaijō Sōzen!!); 187. "Piccolo's Super Giantification Spell" (ピッコロ大魔王超巨身術, Pikkoro Daimaō Chōkyoshinjutsu); 188. "Goku's Fight" (孫悟空の試合, Son Gokū no Shiai); 189. "The Demon King's Final Gamble" (大魔王最後の賭け!!, Daimaō Saigo no Kake!!); 190. "Piccolo Destroys Everything!" (ふんばれ!!孫悟空, Funbare!! Son Gokū; lit. 'Stand Firm!! Son Goku'); 191. "The 10 Count" (10カウント, Ten Kaunto); 192. "The Last Gasp!" (万事休す!!, Banji Kyūsu!!; lit. 'It's All Over!!'); 193. "The Fate of the Strongest" (天下一武道会の頂点!!, Tenkaichi Budōkai no Chōten!!; lit. 'The Tenka'ichi Budōkai's Climax!!'); 194. "The Gift of the Dragon Balls" (ドラゴンボールの贈りもの, Doragon Bōru no Okurimono)
Kami tries to imprison Piccolo in a bottle, but Piccolo counterattacks, sealing Kami instead. Piccolo wins the fight and eats the bottle so that Kami will not bother him. Then, the final between Goku and Piccolo starts and both exchange attacks. As Piccolo transforms his body into a giant, Goku enters his mouth and Piccolo vomits up the bottle. Kami is freed by Kuririn, getting Piccolo angry. Piccolo returns to his normal state, and uses his strongest technique to explode the whole area. Although they remain weak due to the attack, Goku and Piccolo keep fighting. Piccolo manages to seriously injure Goku, but as he think he has won, Goku throws Piccolo out of the arena and win. Goku decides to leave Piccolo alive since if he dies Kami will also die, and leaves with Chi-Chi.

== Re-releases ==
=== Kanzenban ===
No.	Chapters	Release date	ISBN
1	1-14	December 4, 2002	ISBN 4-08-873444-0
2	15-29	December 4, 2002	ISBN 4-08-873445-9
3	30-44	December 28, 2002	ISBN 4-08-873446-7
4	45-59	December 28, 2002	ISBN 4-08-873447-5
5	60-74	February 4, 2003	ISBN 4-08-873448-3
6	75-89	February 4, 2003	ISBN 4-08-873449-1
7	90-104	March 4, 2003	ISBN 4-08-873450-5
8	105-119	March 4, 2003	ISBN 4-08-873451-3
9	120-134	April 4, 2003	ISBN 4-08-873452-1
10	135-149	April 4, 2003	ISBN 4-08-873453-X
11	150-164	May 1, 2003	ISBN 4-08-873454-8
12	165-179	May 1, 2003	ISBN 4-08-873455-6
13	180-194	June 4, 2003	ISBN 4-08-873456-4

=== Digital colored ===
Volume		Chapters	Release date
Son Goku Training Arc	1	1-13	February 4, 2013
Son Goku Training Arc	2	14-26	February 4, 2013
Son Goku Training Arc	3	27-40	February 4, 2013
Son Goku Training Arc	4	41-54	February 4, 2013
Red Ribbon Army Arc	1	55-66	February 4, 2013
Red Ribbon Army Arc	2	67-78	February 4, 2013
Red Ribbon Army Arc	3	79-89	February 4, 2013
Red Ribbon Army Arc	4	90-100	February 4, 2013
Red Ribbon Army Arc	5	101-112	February 4, 2013
Piccolo Daimaō Arc	1	113-123	February 4, 2013
Piccolo Daimaō Arc	2	124-134	February 4, 2013
Piccolo Daimaō Arc	3	135-146	February 4, 2013
Piccolo Daimaō Arc	4	147-158	February 4, 2013
Piccolo Daimaō Arc	5	159-170	February 4, 2013
Piccolo Daimaō Arc	6	171-182	February 4, 2013
Piccolo Daimaō Arc	7	183-194	February 4, 2013

=== Full color ===
Volume		Chapters	Release date	ISBN
Boyhood Arc	1	1-16	January 4, 2016	ISBN 9784088805719
Boyhood Arc	2	17-33	January 4, 2016	ISBN 9784088805726
Boyhood Arc	3	34-50	January 4, 2016	ISBN 9784088805733
Boyhood Arc	4	51-57	January 4, 2016	ISBN 9784088805993
Boyhood Arc	5	58-84	February 5, 2016	ISBN 9784088806013
Boyhood Arc	6	85-101	February 5, 2016	ISBN 9784088806020
Boyhood Arc	7	102-117	February 5, 2016	ISBN 9784088806037
Boyhood Arc	8	118-134	February 5, 2016	ISBN 9784088806204
Piccolo Daimaō Arc	1	135-149	March 5, 2016	ISBN 9784088806211
Piccolo Daimaō Arc	2	150-164	March 5, 2016	ISBN 9784088806228
Piccolo Daimaō Arc	3	165-179	March 5, 2016	ISBN 9784088806440
Piccolo Daimaō Arc	4	180-194	March 5, 2016	ISBN 9784088806457
