= List of Dragon Ball Z chapters =

Viz Media's North American cover of the first volume for Dragon Ball Z, which was the seventeenth volume from the original Japanese releases.

Dragon Ball Z (originally published in Japan as Dragon Ball chapters 195–519) is the English title for the last two thirds of the Dragon Ball manga, which was written and illustrated by Akira Toriyama. The story follows Son Goku as he discovers that he comes from the extraterrestrial Saiyan warrior race and faces powerful enemies who threaten the inhabitants of earth and the wider universe.

The original series was issued in the magazine Weekly Shōnen Jump. The individual chapters were collected by Shueisha in a series of 42 tankōbon volumes; The first tankōbon was released on September 10, 1985, while the last one was released on August 4, 1995. In 2002, the manga was re-released in a collection of 34 kanzenban, which included a slightly rewritten ending, new covers, and color artwork from its Weekly Shōnen Jump run. There have also been two anime adaptations, both produced by Toei Animation. The first, also named Dragon Ball, adapted the first sixteen volumes of the Japanese manga and the second, Dragon Ball Z, adapted the remaining twenty-six volumes.

The distribution company Viz Media has released all 42 volumes in English in the United States, with volumes seventeen through forty-two renamed "Dragon Ball Z" volumes one through twenty-six. Both "series" were published since March 1998 (with a re-release of the first ten volumes in 2003); the last volume of the second part was released on June 6, 2006. The first 134 chapters of "Dragon Ball Z" were also released across individual comic books, chapters 135-226 made their North American debuts in Shonen Jump magazine, while chapters 227-325 were released exclusively in the graphic novel format. In June 2008, Viz began re-releasing both "series" in a wideban format called "Viz Big Edition", which is a collection of three volumes in one. On November 4, 2008, a "Collector's Edition" of volume one with a hardback was made available. In February 2013, Viz began serializing a fully colored version of the manga in their digital anthology Weekly Shonen Jump, under the title Dragon Ball (Full Color).

== Volume list ==
No.	Title	Original release date	English release date
1 (Note: The Japanese release also includes chapters 193-194 of Dragon Ball.)	The World's Greatest Team (A Never Before Seen Terror); Katsute Nai Kyōfu (かつてない恐怖)	May 10, 1989; 978-4-08-851614-1	March 12, 2003; 978-1-56931-930-7
001. "The Mysterious Warrior From Space" (謎の異星人戦士, Nazo no Iseijin Senshi); 002. "Kakarrot" (カカロット, Kakarotto); 003. "Tails of Future Not-Quite-Past" (孫悟空の過去!!, Son Gokū no Kako!!; lit. 'Son Goku's Past'); 004. "An Enemy in Common" (共通の大敵, Kyōtsū no Taiteki); 005. "An Unexpected Strength" (ラディッツとの対決, Radittsu to no Taiketsu; lit. 'Showdown with Raditz'); 006. "Nothing Up My Sleeve..." (かつてない恐怖, Katsute Nai Kyōfu; lit. 'An Unprecedented Terror'); 007. "Piccolo's Farewell to Arms!?" (ピッコロの切り札, Pikkoro no Kirifuda); 008. "A Surprise Appearance" (魔貫光殺砲, Makankōsappō; lit. 'The Makankōsappō'); 009. "Goku's Last Chance" (孫悟空最後の手段!!, Son Gokū Saigo no Shudan!!); 010. "Sayonara, Goku" (さようなら孫悟空, Sayōnara Son Gokū)
Five years after defeating Piccolo at the 23rd Tenka'ichi Budōkai, Son Goku has married Chi-Chi and they have a son named Son Gohan. When Goku and Gohan visit his teacher Kame-Sen'nin, they are confronted by a humanoid man called Raditz. He tells Goku that he is his older brother and that Goku is a member of the Saiyan race who was sent to Earth to destroy it. Raditz kidnaps Gohan and tells Goku to kill 100 people within the next 24 hours. Piccolo agrees to help Goku defeat Raditz, finding him to be a greater enemy than Goku. When the two are about to be defeated, Gohan furiously attacks Raditz, enabling Goku and Piccolo to fatally wound Raditz at the cost of Goku's own life. However, before he dies, Raditz reveals that two Saiyans stronger than him will come to Earth in one year's time.
2	The Lord of Worlds (Son Gohan and Piccolo Daimao); Son Gohan to Pikkoro Daimaō (孫悟飯とピッコロ大魔王)	July 10, 1989; 978-4-08-851615-8	March 12, 2003; 978-1-56931-931-4
011. "A Warrior in Hell" (あの世でファイト!!, Ano Yo de Faito!!; lit. 'A Fight in the Afterlife!!'); 012. "Gohan and Piccolo" (孫悟飯とピッコロ大魔王, Son Gohan to Pikkoro Daimaō); 013. "Son Gohan, the Inconsolable" (なげく孫悟飯, Nageku Son Gohan); 014. "Deeds Done by the Full Moon" (満月の出来ごと, Mangetsu no Dekigoto); 015. "Goku and Gohan's Training Begins!!!" (それぞれの1年間, Sorezore no Ichinenkan; lit. 'Everyone's Year'); 016. "Masters and Students" (親子二代の荒修業, Oyako Nidai no Ara Shugyō; lit. 'The Father and Son's Harsh Training'); 017. "The Hardest Time of His Death" (界王さまと、がんばる死人孫悟空!, Kaiōsama to, Ganbaru Shinin Son Gokū!; lit. 'Do Your Best with Kaiō-sama, Dead Son Goku!'); 018. "Closer... Closer..." (サイヤ人迫る!!, Saiyajin Semaru!!; lit. 'The Saiyans Approach!!'); 019. "The Day of the Saiyans" (サイヤ人来たる!!, Saiyajin Kitaru!!; lit. 'The Saiyans Arrive!!'); 020. "Let the Games Begin!" (ベジータのゲーム, Bejīta no Geimu; lit. 'Vegeta's Game'); 021. "One Down..." (ヤムチャの予感, Yamucha no Yokan; lit. 'Yamcha's Premonition'); 022. "Heroes in Terror" (怯える戦士たち, Obieru Senshitachi)
Piccolo decides to train Gohan to see if he is able to use his hidden powers to defeat the Saiyans, whereas Goku is brought to the Other World by Kami to train with Kaiō-sama. After running along the Serpentine Road, Goku meets Kaiō-sama and starts training with him under strong gravity. After finishing his training, Goku is revived by the Dragon Balls, but he is forced to run again if he wants to return to Earth. The two Saiyans, the Saiyan Prince Vegeta and Nappa, arrive on Earth and confront the opposing warriors Piccolo, Gohan, Kuririn, Yamcha, Chaozu and Tenshinhan. Nappa creates plant-based monsters known as Cultivars (栽培マン, Saibaiman) that fight the warriors, with one managing to kill Yamcha with a suicide attack. After Kuririn and Piccolo destroy all of the Cultivars, the group is confronted by an angry Nappa.
3	Earth vs. the Saiyans (Hurry, Son Goku!); Isoge! Son Gokū (いそげ！孫悟空)	November 10, 1989; 978-4-08-851616-5	March 12, 2003; 978-1-56931-932-1
023. "Hope Runs Out" (いそげ!孫悟空, Isoge! Son Gokū; lit. 'Hurry, Son Goku!'); 024. "The Last Blast" (最後の気功砲, Saigo no Kikōhō; lit. 'The Final Kikōhō'); 025. "Goku, Hurry!" (3時間, San-jikan; lit. '3 Hours'); 026. "Back From the Other Side" (わずかな光, Wazuka na Hikari; lit. 'A Faint Light'); 027. "The Time Draws Near" (窮鼠、猫を咬む, Kyūso Neko o Kamu; lit. 'The Cornered Mouse Bites the Cat'); 028. "The Death of a God!!" (孫悟空大接近!!, Son Gokū Daisekkin!!; lit. 'Son Goku's Great Approach!!'); 029. "Piccolo's Last Stand" (ピッコロと悟飯, Pikkoro to Gohan; lit. 'Piccolo and Gohan'); 030. "The Quiet Wrath of Son Goku" (孫悟空の静かな怒り, Son Gokū no Shizuka na Ikari); 031. "Vengeance" (ナッパ手も足も出ず!!, Nappa Te mo Ashi mo Dezu!!; lit. 'Nappa, Completely Helpless!!'); 032. "The Mystery of the Kaiō-ken" (界王拳の謎, Kaiōken no Nazo); 033. "The Last of Nappa" (動きはじめた帝王, Ugoki Hajimeta Teiō; lit. 'The Emperor Stirs'); 034. "Mano a Maniac!!" (一騎打ち!!, Ikkiuchi!!; lit. 'One-on-One Combat!!')
Tenshinhan and Chaozu sacrifice their lives in an attempt to defeat Nappa, but he remains unharmed. Nappa continues to battle Kuririn, Gohan and Piccolo, remaining as the strongest combatant. Gohan attempts to fight him alone, but Piccolo sacrifices himself to save him from Nappa's ultimate attack. Piccolo's death also causes Kami to fade from existence and thus, the Dragon Balls turn to stone permanently. When Nappa is about to finish off Gohan, Goku arrives and takes his place. Goku easily defeats Nappa, who is later executed by a furious Vegeta. Goku then faces off against Vegeta, but is easily surpassed by him.
4	Goku vs. Vegeta (A Fateful Super Decisive Battle!!); Tenkawakeme no Chōkessen!! (天下分け目の超決戦)	January 10, 1990; 978-4-08-851617-2	March 12, 2003; 978-1-56931-933-8
035. "The Decisive Battle at Last!" (天下分け目の超決戦!!, Tenkawakeme no Chōkessen!!); 036. "Too Much Power?" (あぶない3倍界王拳!, Abunai Sanbai Kaiōken!; lit. 'The Dangerous Three-Fold Kaiō-ken!'); 037. "Battle in the Red Zone!!" (レッドゾーンの闘い!, Reddo Zōn no Tatakai!); 038. "The Moon" (「月」, 'Tsuki'); 039. "The Energy Sphere" (だせるか!?元気玉!!, Daseru ka!? Genkidama!!; lit. 'Can He Unleash It?! The Genki-Dama!!'); 040. "All That Power..." (どうなる!?元気玉!!, Dō Naru!? Genkidama!!; lit. 'What Will Happen?! The Genki-Dama!!'); 041. "The Last Heartbeat" (孫悟空、虫の息!!, Son Gokū, Mushi no Iki!!; lit. 'Son Goku, At Death's Door!!'); 042. "Least Resistance" (ささやかな抵抗, Sasayaka na Teikō); 043. "One More... the Sphere!" (もういちど元気玉!, Mō Ichido Genkidama!!; lit. 'Once Again, the Genki-Dama!!'); 044. "The Hopes of a Planet" (元気玉の行方!!, Genkidama no Yukue!!; lit. 'The Genki-Dama's Course!!'); 045. "The Worn-Out Warriors" (ボロボロの戦士たち, Boroboro no Senshitachi); 046. "Monkey in the Moon" (最後の賭け!!, Saigo no Kake!!; lit. 'A Final Gamble!!')
To fight against Vegeta, Goku performs his Kaiō-Ken technique to multiply his energy but is left considerably exhausted. After being overwhelmed in battle, Vegeta creates an artificial moon to turn into a Great Ape, and starts torturing the weakened Goku. Gohan, Kuririn and Yajirobe go to Goku's aid and manage to cut off Vegeta's tail, returning him to his human state. Vegeta is still able to fight them and Goku hands over the remainder of the Genki-Dama he had formed to Kuririn. Kuririn throws the Genki-Dama at Vegeta who dodges it, but Gohan manages to reflect it back at Vegeta, who manages to survive the attack. As Vegeta prepares to kill the group, Gohan's Saiyan tail appears, causing him to turn into a Great Ape. Gohan almost kills Vegeta, but his tail is cut off at the last moment.
5	Dragon Ball in Space (Go For It! The Planet Namek); Mezase! Namekku no Hoshi (めざせ！ナメックの星)	April 10, 1990; 978-4-08-851618-9	March 12, 2003; 978-1-56931-934-5
047. "Goku's Request" (孫悟空の頼み..., Son Gokū no Tanomi...); 048. "The Bittersweet End" (憂うつな幕切れ..., Yūtsu na Makugire; lit. 'A Gloomy Closing Scene...'); 049. "Destination Namek" (めざせ!ナメックの星, Mezase! Namekku no Hoshi; lit. 'Go For It! The Planet Namek'); 050. "The Mysterious Spaceship" (宇宙船発見!!, Uchūsen Hakken!!; lit. 'A Spaceship Found!!'); 051. "3... 2... 1... Lift Off!" (ナメック星行き発進!!, Namekkusei Iki Hasshin!!; lit. 'Departing for Planet Namek!!'); 052. "The Return of Vegeta" (ベジータ復活!!, Bejīta Fukkatsu!!; lit. 'Vegeta Revived!!'); 053. "Planet Namek, Cold and Dark" (暗雲うずまくナメック星, An'un Uzumaku Namekkusei; lit. 'Dark Clouds Swirl Over Planet Namek'); 054. "The Mysterious Strangers" (謎のストレンジャー, Nazo no Sutorenjā); 055. "Vegeta's True Power" (ベジータのスーパーパワー, Bejīta no Sūpā Pawā; lit. 'Vegeta's Super Power'); 056. "Goku Returns! Again!" (孫悟空復活!!, Son Gokū Fukkatsu!!; lit. 'Son Goku Revived!!'); 057. "Son Goku's Spaceship" (孫悟空の宇宙船, Son Gokū no Uchūsen); 058. "Namekian Fear" (怯えるナメック星人, Obieru Namekkuseijin)
Kuririn attempts to kill Vegeta with Yajirobe's sword, but Goku pleads him not to do it as he wants to fight him again. Bulma and her friends arrive to rescue them and take them to the hospital. With the Dragon Balls no longer functional, they decide to go to Piccolo and Kami's home planet, Namek, in order to find its Dragon Balls so that they can wish Kami and Piccolo back and restore the Dragon Balls, thus allowing them to revive Yamcha, Tenshinhan and Chaozu. Kami's servant, Mr. Popo, gives them the spaceship that Kami originally came to Earth in, and Bulma, along with Kuririn and Gohan, heads to Namek. Goku is initially unable to go due to his injuries, but after being healed by the newly grown senzu beans, he goes to Namek using a spaceship that Bulma's father built. On Namek, Gohan and Kuririn discover that a powerful villain of the universe named Freeza is searching for the Dragon Balls and to get them, he starts killing natives. a revived Vegeta goes to Namek with the same purpose, also planning to defeat Freeza.
6	Battlefield Namek (The Namekians' Resistance); Namekkuseijin no Teikō (ナメック星人の抵抗)	July 10, 1990; 978-4-08-851619-6	March 12, 2003; 978-1-56931-935-2
059. "Showdown!" (ある村の攻防戦, Arumura no Kōbōsen; lit. 'A Village's Battle'); 060. "Ten Seconds of Death" (ナメック星人の抵抗, Namekkuseijin no Teikō; lit. 'The Namekian Resistance'); 061. "Son Gohan Snaps!" (孫悟飯逆上!!, Son Gohan Gyakujō!!); 062. "Death in Flight" (死を呼ぶ追跡者!!, Shi o Yobu Tsuisekisha!!; lit. 'A Deadly Pursuer!!'); 063. "Vegeta vs. Dodoria" (怯えるドドリア, Obieru Dodoria; lit. 'Dodoria in Terror'); 064. "Hide and Seek" (危険がいっぱい!!, Kiken ga Ippai!!; lit. 'Lots of Danger!!'); 065. "The Sixth Dragon Ball" (6個めのドラゴンボール, Rokkome no Doragon Bōru); 066. "The Last Dragon Ball" (ドラゴンボール最後の1個, Doragon Bōru Saigo no Ikko); 067. "The Four Dead Heroes" (びびる界王さま, Bibiru Kaiōsama; lit. 'Kaiō-sama's Freaked Out'); 068. "Vegeta vs. Zarbon" (ベジータとザーボン, Bejīta to Zābon); 069. "Zarbon's True Power" (ザーボンの秘めた力, Zābon no Himeta Chikara); 070. "The Great Elder's House" (最長老の家, Saichōrō no Ie)
Several warriors from Namek try to stop Freeza, but they are all killed by his soldiers. Gohan and Kuririn rescue the only Namek survivor, a kid called Dende, but they are followed by one of Freeza's men, Dodoria (ドドリア). As they try to escape, Dodoria is attacked by Vegeta, who wants to know if it is true that Freeza destroyed Planet Vegeta. As Dodoria reveals that is true, Vegeta kills him and starts searching for the Dragon Balls. Dende takes Kuririn to the Dragon Balls' creator, the Great Elder (最長老, Saichōrō), to get some help. Vegeta comes across another one of Freeza's men, Zarbon, and fights him. Zarbon performs a transformation that increases his powers, allowing him to defeat Vegeta.
7	The Ginyu Force (The Terrible Ginyu Special-Squad); Kyōfu no Ginyū Tokusentai (恐怖のギニュー特戦隊)	October 8, 1990; 978-4-08-851620-2	March 12, 2003; 978-1-56931-936-9
071. "The Dragon Balls Change Hands" (移り変わる7個のドラゴンボール, Utsuri Kawaru Nanako no Doragon Bōru); 072. "Vegeta's Laughter, Freeza's Rage" (笑うベジータ怒るフリーザ, Warau Bejīta Ikaru Furīza); 073. "Reunion of Terror!" (恐怖の再会, Kyōfu no Saikai); 074. "Vegeta in Overdrive!" (ベジータ快進撃!, Bejīta Kaishingeki!); 075. "Brains and Brawn" (悟飯とベジータのドラゴンボール, Gohan to Bejīta no Doragon Bōru; lit. 'Gohan and Vegeta's Dragon Ball'); 076. "Premonitions of War" (大戦争の予感, Daisensō no Yokan); 077. "The Enemy of My Enemy..." (接近!!ギニュー特戦隊, Sekkin!! Ginyū Tokusentai; lit. 'They're Closing In!! The Ginyu Special Squadron'); 078. "The Ginyu Force" (間にあえ!!ななつのドラゴンボール, Ma ni Ae!! Nanatsu no Doragon Bōru; lit. 'Make it in Time!! The Seven Dragon Balls'); 079. "Five Deadly Fighters" (恐怖のギニュー特戦隊, Kyōfu no Ginyū Tokusentai; lit. 'The Terrible Ginyu Special Squadron'); 080. "Gurd's Psychic Powers" (グルドの超能力, Gurudo no Chōnōryoku); 081. "Vegeta vs. Reacoom" (ベジータの速攻!!, Bejīta no Sokkō!!; lit. 'Vegeta's Quick Attack!!'); 082. "Vegeta vs. Reacoom, Part 2" (絶望のベジータ, Zetsubō no Bejīta; lit. 'No Hope for Vegeta')
Kuririn meets the Great Elder who gives him a Dragon Ball to help him. Zarbon is ordered by Freeza to find Vegeta, who already has a Dragon Ball and thus, his location is unknown. Vegeta takes advantage of the situation and, after recovering, he becomes strong enough to kill Zarbon thanks to the Saiyans' genetic ability. Kuririn takes Gohan to visit the Great Elder to see if he can awake his hidden power, but Vegeta finds them. Before attacking them, Vegeta discovers that Freeza's elite soldiers, the Ginyu Force, have arrived on Namek and agrees to join forces with Kuririn and Gohan to confront them. Captain Ginyu steals their Dragon Balls and takes them to Freeza, while his companions faces their opponents. Vegeta decapitates Gurd with a single blow, but he is then defeated by Reacoom.
8	Goku vs. Ginyu (Goku or Ginyu!?); Gokū ka!? Ginyū ka!? (悟空か！？ギニューか！？)	January 10, 1991; 978-4-08-851414-7	May 7, 2003; 978-1-56931-937-6
083. "Freeza Victorious?!!" (笑うフリーザ, Warau Furīza; lit. 'Freeza Laughs'); 084. "Son Gohan's Last Stand" (孫悟飯死す!?, Son Gohan Shisu!?; lit. 'Son Gohan Dies?!'); 085. "Son Goku Has Landed!" (不思議な孫悟空, Fushigi na Son Gokū; lit. 'The Mysterious Son Goku'); 086. "Super Saiyan?" (超サイヤ人!?, Sūpā Saiyajin!?); 087. "Jheese and Butta" (対決!!ジースとバータ, Taiketsu!! Jīsu to Bāta; lit. 'Showdown!! Jheese and Butta'); 088. "With Allies Like These..." (ベジータの複雑な心, Bejīta no Fukuzatsu na Kokoro; lit. 'Vegeta's Complex Mind'); 089. "Ginyu Steps In" (ギニュー隊長おでまし!!, Ginyū Taichō Odemashi!!); 090. "A Matter of Pride" (ギニュー隊長のプライド, Ginyū Taichō no Puraido; lit. 'Captain Ginyu's Pride'); 091. "The Last Three Namekians" (危うし最長老たち, Ayaushi Saichōrōtachi; lit. 'The Great Elder and Company in Danger'); 092. "Nail, Champion of Namek" (ナメック星の戦士ネイル, Namekkusei no Senshi Neiru); 093. "The Switch" (ボディチェンジ, Bodi Chenji; lit. 'Body Change'); 094. "Goku or Ginyu?!" (悟空か!?ギニューか!?, Gokū ka!? Ginyū ka!?)
Both Gohan and Kuririn try to fight Reacoom but are defeated. Before Reacoom can finish off Gohan, Goku arrives and knocks Reacoom out cold with a single punch. Goku then starts fighting against Jheese and Butta. When Butta is incapacitated, Jheese escapes to call Ginyu, and Vegeta murders the helpless Reacoom and Butta. Unable to summon the dragon, Ginyu attacks Goku in order to learn how to, but is easily surpassed. Freeza visits the Great Elder with the same purpose, and the Namekian Nail (ネイル, Neiru) tries to stop him. Seeing that he cannot defeat Goku, Ginyu performs a technique to exchange their bodies, allowing him to take Goku's body. Ginyu and Jheese find and attack Vegeta, Gohan and Kuririn, but Ginyu is unable to control Goku's energy.
9	The Wrath of Freeza (Freeza's Super Transformation!!); Furīza Chōhenshin!! (フリーザ超変身！！)	March 8, 1991; 978-4-08-851415-4	May 7, 2003; 978-1-56931-938-3
095. "Ginyu's Mistake!" (ギニュー痛恨の大誤算!!, Ginyū Tsūkon no Daigosan!!); 096. "The Final Switch" (ギニュー敗れる!!!, Ginyū Yabureru!!!; lit. 'Ginyu is Defeated!!!'); 097. "Nail's Sacrifice" (怒りのフリーザ!!!, Ikari no Furīza!!!; lit. 'An Angry Freeza!!!'); 098. "The True Dragon God" (いでよ本場の神龍!!, Ide yo Honba no Shenron!!); 099. "The Three Wishes" (みっつの願い, Mittsu no Negai); 100. "The Last Wish" (最後の願い, Saigo no Negai); 101. "The Assimilation" (おもいがけぬスーパーパワーアップ, Omoigakenu Sūpā Pawā Appu; lit. 'An Unexpected Super Power-Up'); 102. "The Transformation" (フリーザ超変身!!, Furīza Chōhenshin!!; lit. 'Freeza's Super Transformation!!'); 103. "Freeza vs. Gohan" (悟飯逆上!!, Gohan Gyakujō!!; lit. 'Gohan in a Frenzy!!'); 104. "Freeza vs. Gohan, Part 2" (悟飯ボロボロ, Gohan Boroboro; lit. 'A Worn-Out Gohan'); 105. "The Fourth Warrior" (戦士の復活, Senshi no Fukkatsu; lit. 'A Warrior's Revival'); 106. "Freeza vs. Piccolo" (ピッコロの自身, Pikkoro no Jishin; lit. 'Piccolo's Self-Confidence')
Having become stronger again, Vegeta kills Jheese and faces Ginyu. Ginyu tries to exchange bodies with Vegeta, but Goku intercepts the attack, recovering his original body. Ginyu once again tries to change bodies, but Goku throws a Namekian Frog in the way, trapping Ginyu in its body. Vegeta sends Goku to a medical machine to recover from his injuries, and Kuririn and Gohan go ask Dende to call the dragon. The Namekian dragon, Porunga, is able to grant three wishes but can only revive one person at a time. They ask to revive Piccolo so that Kami and Earth's Dragon Balls can return. After they wish for Piccolo to be sent to Namek, Porunga disappears due to the Great Elder's death. A furious Freeza arrives and attacks them, showing a transformation that increases his powers. Gohan is able to fight Freeza, but then he is replaced by Piccolo. Piccolo proves to be a match for Freeza as he has fused with Nail, who was on the verge of death after fighting Freeza.
10	Goku vs. Freeza (Son Goku... Revived!!); Son Gokū...Fukkatsu!! (孫悟空…復活！！)	June 10, 1991; 978-4-08-851416-1	May 7, 2003; 978-1-56931-939-0
107. "Freeza vs. Piccolo, Part 2" (はてしないエスカレート!!, Hate Shinai Esukareito!!; lit. 'An Endless Escalation!!'); 108. "Freeza's Third Form" (フリーザ第2の変身, Furīza Daini no Henshin; lit. 'Freeza's Second Transformation'); 109. "Vegeta's Ploy" (フリーザのダメ押し!!, Furīza no Dameoshi!!; lit. 'Freeza Makes Sure!!'); 110. "The Final Transformation" (超サイヤ人そして超フリーザ誕生!?, Sūpā Saiyajin Soshite Sūpā Furīza Tanjō!?; lit. 'Birth of a Super Saiyan and a Super Freeza?!'); 111. "Will It Be Freeza? Or Vegeta?" (フリーザか!ベジータか!, Furīza ka! Bejīta ka!); 112. "Son Goku... Resurrected!!" (孫悟空...復活!!, Son Gokū...Fukkatsu!!); 113. "The Ultimate Battle Begins!" (超決戦の火ブタ切る!!, Chōkessen no Hibuta Kiru!!); 114. "The Death of Vegeta" (ベジータ死す!!, Bejīta Shisu!!; lit. 'Vegeta Dies!!'); 115. "Underwater Battle" (両者ゆずらず!, Ryōsha Yuzurazu!; lit. 'Neither Gives an Inch!'); 116. "Aerial Battle" (さぐり合い, Saguri Ai; lit. 'Searching Each Other Out'); 117. "Hand to Foot" (肉弾戦, Nikudansen; lit. 'A Physical Battle'); 118. "50% Maximum Power" (怪物フリーザ, Kaibutsu Furīza; lit. 'The Monster Freeza'); 119. "Kaiō-ken times 20!!!" (20倍界王拳の賭け, Nijūbai Kaiōken no Kake; lit. 'The Risks of Twenty-Fold Kaiō-ken')
Freeza uses his second transformation, managing to surpass Piccolo, but Gohan comes to his aid. Vegeta forces Kuririn to injure him and then has Dende heal him, so that he can become stronger. As Vegeta is healed, Freeza performs his final transformation. Freeza then kills Dende so that he will not heal anybody else and Vegeta faces him, but is unable to inflict much damage on Freeza. After recovering from his wounds, Goku goes to stop Freeza, who kills Vegeta before their fight starts. Goku manages to fight equally against Freeza, who reveals he will start using only half of his maximum energy.
11	The Super Saiyan (The Legendary Super Saiyan); Densetsu no Sūpā Saiyajin (伝説の超サイヤ人)	August 7, 1991; 978-4-08-851417-8	May 7, 2003; 978-1-56931-807-2
120. "The Great Genki-Dama" (孫悟空最後の決断, Son Gokū Saigo no Ketsudan; lit. 'Son Goku's Final Decision'); 121. "The Last Chance" (ラストチャンス!特大元気玉, Rasuto Chansu! Tokudai Genkidama; lit. 'The Last Chance! An Extra-Large Genki-Dama'); 122. "The Galaxy Strikes Back" (宇宙の恨み、フリーザを貫く!!, Uchū no Urami, Furīza o Tsuranuku!!; lit. 'The Hatred of the Universe, Pierces Freeza!!'); 123. "Life or Death" (生か死か, Sei ka Shi ka); 124. "The Super Saiyan" (伝説の超サイヤ人, Densetsu no Sūpā Saiyajin; lit. 'The Legendary Super Saiyan'); 125. "The Tables Turn" (フリーザ初めての屈辱と絶望, Furīza Hajimete no Kutsujoku to Zetsubō; lit. 'Freeza's First Taste of Humiliation and Despair'); 126. "The End of Namek?" (消え去るナメック星と希望, Kiesaru Namekkusei to Kibō; lit. 'Planet Namek and Hope Disappear'); 127. "Maximum Desperation" (フリーザ決死のフルパワー, Furīza Kesshi no Furu Pawā; lit. 'Freeza's Do-or-Die Full Power'); 128. "Two Warriors, One Finish" (両者最後の大決戦!, Ryōsha Saigo no Daikessen!; lit. 'A Final, Grand Decisive Battle for Both Sides!'); 129. "The Two Wishes" (ふたつの願い, Futatsu no Negai); 130. "The Quiet, Fierce Battle" (静かなる激闘, Shizuka Naru Gekitō); 131. "Son Goku Quits" (見切りをつけた孫悟空, Mikiri o Tsuketa Son Gokū)
Unable to defeat Freeza, Goku performs the Genki-Dama, taking energy from few planets around. Goku launches the Genki-Dama at Freeza, causing a big explosion on Namek. Everybody gathers back together, only for Freeza to appear before them, severely injuring Piccolo and killing Kuririn in the process. Goku's rage finally erupts, causing a strange transformation that turns his hair gold and his eyes bright blue; he has become the first Super Saiyan in over 1,000 years. In this new state, Goku easily overpowers a horrified Freeza, who launches an energy blast straight at Namek's core so that the planet will explode within five minutes. Freeza then uses all his power, and continues facing Goku. Kaiō-sama has Shenlong revive everyone killed by Freeza and his men, and Porunga transports them all to Earth with the exception of Freeza and Goku, the latter wanting to avenge Kuririn's death.
12	Enter Trunks (The Boy From the Future); Mirai kara Kita Shōnen (未来から来た少年)	November 8, 1991; 978-4-08-851418-5	August 6, 2003; 978-1-56931-985-7
132. "Son Goku's Choice" (空しい決着, Munashī Ketchaku; lit. 'An Empty Conclusion'); 133. "The End of Everything" (すべての終わり, Subete no Owari); 134. "Namek's End" (ナメック星の消ゆ, Namekkusei no Kiyu); 135. "Where is Goku?" (帰らない悟空, Kaeranai Gokū; lit. 'Goku Won't Be Coming Home'); 136. "The Coming of King Cold" (フリーザ親子地球に降り立つ, Furīza Oyako Chikyū ni Oritatsu; lit. 'Freeza and his Father Descend to Earth'); 137. "The Young Man of Mystery" (謎の少年, Nazo no Shōnen); 138. "The Second Super Saiyan" (ふたりめの超サイヤ人, Futarime no Sūpā Saiyajin); 139. "Son Goku Comes Home" (帰って来た孫悟空, Kaette Kita Son Gokū); 140. "The Boy From the Future" (未来から来た少年, Mirai kara Kita Shōnen); 141. "The Terrifying Message" (恐怖のメッセージ, Kyōfu no Messeiji); 142. "The Risky Decision" (3年後の賭け, Sannengo no Kake; lit. 'A Three Year Gamble'); 143. "The Gathering of the Warriors" (集う超戦士たち, Tsudō Sūpā Senshitachi; lit. 'The Super Warriors Assemble')
Goku defeats Freeza and tries to escape Namek just as it explodes. Bulma and her friends try to revive him on Earth with Porunga, but they discover that Goku has survived, training on another planet. Using Porunga, Yamcha, Tenshinhan, Kuririn and Chaozu are revived, while the Namekians depart to live on another planet. One year later, the warriors discover that Freeza has survived and is coming with his father, King Cold (コルド大王, Korudo Daiō), to takes revenge on Goku and destroy the Earth. However, Freeza's entire group is attacked by a teenager who transforms into a Super Saiyan and slaughters them. The teenager then meets up with Gohan's group, claiming that he is going to wait for Goku to return. The teenager reveals his identity to Goku as Trunks, the future son of Bulma and Vegeta. He further informs Goku that two androids created by Dr. Gero of the Red Ribbon Army will appear in three years to kill him. Trunks returns to the future in his time machine and three years later, Goku and his friends reunite to fight the two androids.
13	The Red Ribbon Androids (Goku, Defeated!); Gokū, Yabureru! (悟空、敗れる！)	March 10, 1992; 978-4-08-851419-2	October 8, 2003; 978-1-56931-986-4
144. "Slaughter in South City" (人造人間街へ..., Jinzōningen Machi e...; lit. 'The Artificial Humans Head to the City...'); 145. "Yamcha Falls" (ヤムチャ間一髪!!, Yamucha Kan'ippatsu!!; lit. 'A Close Call for Yamcha!!'); 146. "The Red Ribbon Androids" (孫悟空対レッドリボン軍の恨み, Son Gokū Tai Reddo Ribon Gun no Urami; lit. 'Son Goku vs The Red Ribbon Army's Grudge'); 147. "Powerless!" (どうした孫悟空, Dō Shita Son Gokū; lit. 'What's Wrong, Son Goku?'); 148. "One Down..." (悟空、敗れる!, Gokū, Yabureru!; lit. 'Goku, Defeated!'); 149. "Vegeta Returns!!!" (ベジータ出現, Bejīta Shutsugen); 150. "The Androids Unhinged" (うろたえる人造人間, Urotaeru Jinzōningen); 151. "A Change of Plans" (20号逃げる!, Nijūgō Nigeru!; lit. 'No. 20 Runs Away!'); 152. "Trunks Returns" (トランクス再登場, Torankusu Saitōjō); 153. "A Sound of Thunder" (トランクスの疑惑, Torankusu no Giwaku; lit. 'Trunks' Confusion'); 154. "Dr. Gero's Laboratory" (研究所へ...!!, Kenkyūjo e...!!; lit. 'To the Laboratory...!!'); 155. "The Androids Awake!" (目覚めた17号、18号, Mezameta Jūnanagō, Jūhachigō; lit. 'No. 17 and No. 18 Are Awakened')
Goku's group separates to find the androids, and Yamcha ends up being attacked by them. Goku and his friends save him, and the former transforms into a Super Saiyan to fight Android #19. Although Goku overpowers #19, he is suddenly weakened by a heart disease that Trunks warned he would have. Vegeta appears to save Goku, who is taken to his house by Yamcha. Vegeta transforms into a Super Saiyan and easily kills #19. Android #20, who is in fact the creator of the androids, Dr. Gero, escapes to his laboratory and is followed by the warriors. As Piccolo finds and overpowers Gero, Trunks appears, saying that he is not one of the two androids from the future. Gero escapes again and awakes the androids #17 and #18, who quickly turn against him.
14	Rise of the Machines (Evil Premonition!); Jāku na Yokan (邪悪な予感)	June 10, 1992; 978-4-08-851420-8	December 31, 2003; 978-1-59116-180-6
156. " #17, #18... #16?" (17号·18号、そして...16号, Jūnanagō · Jūhachigō, Soshite... Jūrokugō); 157. "The Androids Walk Among Us" (謎の16号, Nazo no Jūrokugō; lit. 'The Mysterious No. 16'); 158. "Vegeta vs. Android #18" (ベジータ対18号, Bejīta Tai Jūhachigō); 159. "Vegeta vs. Android #18, Round 2" (さすがのベジータ, Sasuga no Bejīta; lit. 'As Expected of Vegeta'); 160. "The Androids at Ease" (余裕の人造人間たち, Yoyū no Jinzōningentachi); 161. "Retreat and Regroup" (ピッコロの決意, Pikkoro no Ketsui; lit. 'Piccolo's Decision'); 162. "Kami's Conditions" (神様の条件, Kamisama no Jōken); 163. "A Discovery" (ブルマからの知らせ, Buruma kara no Shirase; lit. 'News From Bulma'); 164. "The Time Machine" (邪悪な予感, Jāku na Yokan; lit. 'An Evil Premonition'); 165. "Kami-sama's Vision" (神様は見た!!, Kamisama wa Mita!!); 166. "Kami-sama and the Demon King Become One" (神と大魔王の融合, Kami to Daimaō no Yūgō); 167. "Cell" (謎の怪物、ついに出現!!, Nazo no Kaibutsu, Tsui ni Shutsugen!!; lit. 'The Mysterious Monster, Finally Appears!!')
Android #17 kills Gero and #18 awakens another android called Android 16, who is in fact a pure robot. Vegeta follows and challenges them to a fight. #18 soon defeats Vegeta, causing Piccolo, Trunks and Tenshinhan to interrupt her. However, #17 joins her and all the warriors are defeated with the exception of Kuririn, to whom they explain that their aim is to kill Goku. Furious at not being able to defeat the androids, Piccolo requests Kami to fuse bodies with him so that he can defeat them. Meanwhile, Trunks is told by Bulma that a new time machine has appeared. After investigating it, several people start disappearing around the world. Kami decides to allow Piccolo to absorb his power, but only because there is a new enemy more dangerous than the androids. After fusing with Kami, Piccolo finds a strange creature that is absorbing people and has the powers of several known warriors.
15	The Terror of Cell (Cell, Stealthily Approaching); Shinobiyoru Seru (忍びよるセル)	August 4, 1992; 978-4-08-851686-8	April 14, 2004; 978-1-59116-186-8
168. "Ginger Town Showdown" (ジンジャータウンの決闘, Jinjā Taun no Kettō); 169. "A Farewell to Arms" (解けた怪物の謎, Toketa Kaibutsu no Nazo; lit. 'The Monster's Mystery is Solved'); 170. "Cell Laughs Last" (笑うセル, Warau Seru); 171. "Son Goku Awakens" (目覚めた孫悟空, Mezameta Son Gokū); 172. "The Super Saiyans' Training" (サイヤ人たちの修業, Saiyajintachi no Shugyō; lit. 'The Saiyans' Training'); 173. "Piccolo vs. #17" (新生ピッコロ対17号, Shinsei Pikkoro Tai Jūnanagō; lit. 'The Reborn Piccolo vs No. 17'); 174. "Waiting in the Wings" (忍びよるセル, Shinobiyoru Seru; lit. 'Cell Sneaks Up'); 175. "Cell vs. the Androids" (人造人間対セル, Jinzōningen Tai Seru); 176. "New Piccolo... Last Piccolo?" (新生ピッコロ決死の抵抗, Shinsei Pikkoro Kesshi no Teikō; lit. 'The Reborn Piccolo's Do-or-Die Opposition'); 177. "Cell vs. #16" (動き始めた16号!, Ugoki Hajimeta Jūrokugō!; lit. 'No. 16 Stirs!'); 178. "#16 Summons His Power" (決死の16号パワー!!, Kesshi no Jūrokugō Pawā!!; lit. 'The Desperate No. 16's Power!!'); 179. "The New Cell" (阻止せよ!セルの完全体, Soshi Se yo! Seru no Kanzentai; lit. 'Prevent It! Cell's Perfect Form')
The creature reveals his name as Cell, the last creation of Dr. Gero using cells from several warriors. Cell says he came from a future in which Trunks destroyed the androids, so he killed him and stole his time machine to come to this time and absorb #17 and #18 to reach his perfect form. Piccolo overpowers Cell, who escapes in order to become stronger. Meanwhile, Goku has recovered from his heart disease and takes Vegeta, Gohan and Trunks to Kami's Palace to train in the Room of Spirit and Time, which allows them to train what would be a year in just a day on the outside to surpass their Super Saiyan powers. Trunks and Vegeta enter first, while Piccolo is confronted by the androids and faces #17. After absorbing several people, Cell interrupts them and defeats Piccolo. #16 fights against Cell and overwhelms him, but Cell hides to absorb #17 and evolves into his semi-perfect form. The new Cell easily defeats #16 and attempts to absorb #18, but Tenshinhan intervenes.
16	The Room of Spirit and Time (Cell's Perfect-Form Achieved!!); Seru no Kanzentai Kansei!! (セルの完全体 完成！！)	November 2, 1992; 978-4-08-851687-5	July 14, 2004; 978-1-59116-328-2
180. "Goku Meets Cell" (悟空とセル初めての対峙, Gokū to Seru Hajimete no Taiji); 181. "Vegeta and Trunks Emerge" (ベジータ、トランクス発進!!, Bejīta, Torankusu Hasshin!!); 182. "Vegeta's Confidence" (ベジータに自身あり!, Bejīta ni Jishin Ari!); 183. "Beyond the Super Saiyan" (孫悟空と孫悟飯, Son Gokū to Son Gohan; lit. 'Son Goku and Son Gohan'); 184. "Super Vegeta" (超ベジータ, Sūpā Bejīta); 185. "Cell's Last Chance" (絶たれた!?セルの完全体, Tatareta!? Seru no Kanzentai; lit. 'Interrupted?! Cell's Perfect Form'); 186. "The Evil Truce" (逃げろ!!18号, Nigero!! Jūhachigō; lit. 'Run Away!! No. 18'); 187. "Vegeta vs. Trunks?" (ベジータの好奇心セルを助ける, Bejīta no Kōkishin Seru o Tasukeru; lit. 'Vegeta's Curiosity Saves Cell'); 188. "The Complete Cell" (完全体完成!!, Kanzentai Kansei!!; lit. 'Perfect Form Completed!!'); 189. "A Reversal" (形勢逆転, Keisei Gyakuten); 190. "The Final Flash" (ベジータ、執念の秘策, Bejīta, Shūnen no Hisaku; lit. 'Vegeta's Stubborn Secret Plan'); 191. "Trunks Steps In" (トランクス始動, Torankusu Shidō)
Goku goes to rescue Tenshinhan and Piccolo and takes them to Kami's Palace. As they return, Trunks and Vegeta finish training in and go to face Cell, while Goku and Gohan enter the Room of Spirit and Time. Vegeta fights against Cell and reveals that he has accessed an enhanced version of the Super Saiyan transformation. Vegeta easily defeats Cell, but as the latter tells him that he needs to absorb #18 to become stronger, Vegeta allows him to absorb her. Cell finds #18 and Trunks tries to stop him, but he is opposed by Vegeta. Cell absorbs #18, reaching his perfect form and continues his fight against Vegeta. This time, Vegeta is easily defeated by Cell and Trunks transforms into a version of Super Saiyan that is more powerful than Vegeta's.
17	The Cell Game (The Cell Game Begins); Seru Geemu Hajimaru (セルゲーム始まる)	December 26, 1992; 978-4-08-851688-2	October 12, 2004; 978-1-59116-505-7
192. "Trunks Surpasses His Father" (父を超えた超トランクス!, Chichi o Koeta Sūpā Torankusu; lit. 'Super Trunks Surpasses His Father!'); 193. "The Balance of Power" (超パワーのバランス, Sūpā Pawā no Baransu; lit. 'The Balance of Super Power'); 194. "Cell's Idea" (セルの思いつき, Seru no Omoitsuki); 195. "Message of Terror" (戦慄のメッセージ, Senritsu no Messeiji); 196. "The Emergence" (悟空と悟飯外へ, Gokū to Gohan Soto e; lit. 'Goku and Gohan Emerge'); 197. "The Calm Before the Storm" (大対決戦前の休息, Daikessen Mae no Kyūsoku); 198. "Cell vs. the Army" (王立防衛軍, Ōritsu Bōeigun; lit. 'The Royal Army's Resistance'); 199. "The New Kami-sama" (新しい神様, Atarashī Kamisama); 200. "The Cell Game Begins!" (セルゲーム始まる, Seru Geimu Hajimaru); 201. "Heroes Assemble!" (フルメンバー集合!!, Furu Menbā Shūgō!!; lit. 'Full Member Gathering!!'); 202. "Hercule, Champion of the World" (セルゲームのお荷物!?, Seru Geimu no Onimotsu!?; lit. 'The Cell Game's Dead Weight?!'); "Trunks: The Story" (TRUNKS THE STORY -たったひとりの戦士-, Torankusu za Sutōrī -Tatta Hitori no Senshi-; lit. 'Trunks the Story –A Lone Warrior–')
In his new state, Trunks becomes strong enough to overpower Cell, but Cell defeats him as that transformation also makes him slower. Cell tells Trunks that in a few weeks, he will start a new tournament called the Cell Game, in which anybody can face him. Goku and Gohan leave the Room of Spirit and Time, and learn of Cell's announcement. Goku decides he and Gohan will not train again to defeat Cell, and both spend the time in their Super Saiyan state to control its power. During that period, Goku also goes to Namek to recruit Dende to be the new Guardian of Earth, so that he can recreate Earth's Dragon Balls. The Cell Game starts, but before Goku fights against Cell, he is interrupted by the martial artist Hercule, who is defeated by Cell in a short time.
18	Gohan vs. Cell (The Warrior Who Surpassed Goku); Gokū o Koeta Senshi (悟空を越えた戦士)	June 4, 1993; 978-4-08-851689-9	January 4, 2005; 978-1-59116-637-5
203. "Cell vs. Son Goku" (セル対孫悟空!!, Seru Tai Son Gokū!!); 204. "Full Power" (孫悟空フルパワー, Son Gokū Furu Pawā; lit. 'Son Goku at Full Power'); 205. "The Highest Level" (最高レベルの決戦, Saikō Reberu no Kessen; lit. 'Showdown at the Highest Level'); 206. "Ring Out" (敗北か死か!, Haiboku ka Shi ka!; lit. 'Defeat or Death?!'); 207. "Kamehameha Full Power" (かめはめ波フルパワー, Kamehameha Furu Pawā); 208. "Last Resort" (孫悟空謎の行動, Son Gokū Nazo no Kōdō; lit. 'Son Goku's Mysterious Behavior'); 209. "The Successor" (悟空を超えた戦士, Gokū o Koeta Senshi; lit. 'The Warrior Who Surpassed Goku'); 210. "Let's Go, Gohan!" (発進!超孫悟飯, Hasshin! Sūpā Son Gohan; lit. 'Take Off! Super Son Gohan'); 211. "The Rage of Son Gohan?" (怒るか孫悟飯, Okoru ka Son Gohan); 212. "#16's Secret Weapon" (16号の秘密兵器, Jūrokugō no Himitsu Heiki); 213. "The Little Cells" (セルジュニアの地獄, Seru Junia no Jigoku; lit. 'The Hell of the Cell Juniors'); 214. "Gohan Unleashed!" (孫悟飯爆発!!, Son Gohan Bakuhatsu!!; lit. 'Son Gohan Explodes!!')
Goku starts fighting against Cell and soon both use all their power. Goku performs a Kamehameha with all his energy, but Cell regenerates, both becoming exhausted. Goku then gives up and tells Gohan to fight in his place, saying that his hidden power will be enough to defeat Cell. However, Gohan is unable to use his power and Cell attempts to make him angry so that he could use it. Android #16 tries to stop Cell, but his body is destroyed in the attempt. Cell creates miniature versions of himself called Cell Juniors to attack Gohan's friends in order to anger Gohan. #16's still-functioning head encourages Gohan to fight, before it is crushed by Cell. Gohan becomes enraged, and undergoes a Super Saiyan transformation that makes him strong enough to kill all the Cell Juniors.
19	Death of a Warrior (Goodbye, Warriors); Sayōnara Senshitachi (さようなら戦士たち)	September 3, 1993; 978-4-08-851700-1	April 5, 2005; 978-1-59116-751-8
215. "Cell vs. Gohan" (本気対本気, Honki Tai Honki; lit. 'Seriousness vs Seriousness'); 216. "The Ultimate Kamehameha" (究極のかめはめ波, Kyūkyoku no Kamehameha); 217. "Cell, Brought to Bay" (追い詰められたセル, Oitsumerareta Seru); 218. "The End of the Cell Game" (セルゲームの結末, Seru Geimu no Ketsumatsu); 219. "Gohan's Pain" (苦しむ孫悟飯, Kurushimu Son Gohan); 220. "The Tables Turn" (思わぬ形勢逆転, Omowanu Keisei Gyakuten); 221. "Father and Son" (孫悟空からのメッセージ, Son Gokū kara no Messeiji; lit. 'A Message From Son Goku'); 222. "Kamehameha vs. Kamehameha" (かめはめ波対かめはめ波最後の決戦, Kamehameha Tai Kamehameha Saigo no Kessen; lit. 'Kamehameha vs Kamehameha: A Final Showdown'); 223. "Finale" (大団円, Daidan'en; lit. 'The Grand Finale'); 224. "Farewell, Warriors" (さようなら戦士たち, Sayōnara Senshitachi); 225. "The Other Outcome" (もうひとつの結末, Mō Hitotsu no Ketsumatsu); 226. "Peace to the Future" (未来に平和を..., Mirai ni Heiwa o...)
Gohan easily overwhelms Cell and makes him regurgitate #18 from his stomach, causing Cell to revert to his semi-perfect form. As Cell attempts to self-destruct to destroy Earth, Goku teleports him to Kaiō-sama's planet so that it will not destroy Earth, resulting in the deaths of Kaiō-sama, Bubbles, #17 and himself. However, Cell is able to regenerate and returns to Earth, killing Trunks. Cell attempts to perform a Kamehameha strong enough to destroy the entire solar system, but Gohan receives help from Goku from the Other World to perform a Kamehameha and faces Cell's one. With help from Vegeta, Gohan overpowers Cell and completely eradicates him. Later, as the group summons Shenlong to revive Goku, he informs them that he wishes to remain dead. He also tells Gohan to take over his role as protector of Earth. The now-revived Trunks then returns to the future, where he is able to kill the androids.
20	The New Generation (Birth of a New Hero!!); Nyū Hīrō Tanjō!! (ニューヒーロー誕生！！)	November 4, 1993; 978-4-08-851495-6	May 31, 2005; 978-1-59116-808-9
227. "Herculopolis High" (サタンシティのハイスクール, Satan Shiti no Hai Sukūru; lit. 'Satan City's High School'); 228. "Undercover" (悟飯、とても疲れる, Gohan, Totemo Tsukareru; lit. 'Gohan, Very Tired'); 229. "A Hero Is Born!" (ニューヒーロー誕生!!, Nyū Hīrō Tanjō!!); 230. "Videl's Emergency!!" (ビーデル緊急出動!!, Bīderu Kinkyū Shutsudō!!); 231. "Revealed!!!" (バレた!!!, Bareta!!!); 232. "Strongest in the Heavens!" (天下一武道会, Tenkaichi Budōkai); 233. "Let the Training Begin!" (特訓開始!!, Tokkun Kaishi!!); 234. "Videl Learns to Fly" (ビーデルさんの舞空術, Bīderusan no Bukūjutsu); 235. "Fathers" (迫る天下一武道会, Semaru Tenkaichi Budōkai; lit. 'The Tenka'ichi Budōkai Draws Near'); 236. "The Dragon Team Returns!" (ドラゴンチーム集合!!, Doragon Chīmu Shūgō!!); 237. "The Preliminaries Begin" (予選開始, Yosen Kaishi); 238. "The Two Little Warriors" (ふたりの小さな超戦士, Futari no Chīsa na Sūpā Senshi; lit. 'The Two Small Super Warriors')
Several years after the Cell Game, Gohan is now a teenager and starts going to high school. However, he starts dressing as a superhero named "The Great Saiyaman" to conceal his identity and defeat the city's thieves. Videl, one of his classmates from school, who is also Hercule's daughter, discovers his identity and forces him to enter the next Tenka'ichi Budōkai as well as teach her how to fly. As Gohan returns home, he discovers that Goku is going to return to Earth to enter the tournament, and Vegeta, Kuririn, #18 (who is now Kuririn's wife), and Piccolo also want to enter. After training with Videl, the tournament starts and Goku reunites with his friends and family and meets his second son, Goten. Goten and the younger Trunks from the present timeline are forced to enter into a tournament for children, while the others participate in an adults' tournament, where they can also face Hercule, who is falsely believed to have single-handedly defeated Cell.
21	Tournament of the Heavens (The Plan Begins Moving); Ugoki Hajimeta Sakusen (動き始めた作戦)	April 4, 1994; 978-4-08-851496-3	August 2, 2005; 978-1-59116-873-7
239. "Trunks vs. Goten" (トランクス対孫悟天, Torankusu Tai Son Goten); 240. "Trunks vs. Goten, Part 2" (トランクス対孫悟天2, Torankusu Tai Son Goten Tsū); 241. "The Winner!" (「少年の部」勝者決定!, Shōnen no Bu" Shōsha Kettei!; lit. 'The 'Boys Division' Winner is Decided!'); 242. "Hercule's Courage!" (ミスター·サタンのド根性!, Misutā Satan no Dokonjō!; lit. 'Mister Satan's Got Some Guts!'); 243. "The Mysterious Duo" (不思議なふたり, Fushigi na Futari); 244. "The Finalists are Chosen!" (対戦相手決定す!, Taisen Aite Ketteisu!); 245. "The First Two Fights" (クリリンそしてピッコロの闘い, Kuririn Soshite Pikkoro no Tatakai; lit. 'Kuririn and Piccolo's Fights'); 246. "Shin's Surprise" (シンの意外な正体, Shin no Igai na Shōtai; lit. 'Shin's Surprising True Identity'); 247. "Videl... Battered" (ビーデルボロボロ, Bīderu Boroboro); 248. "Gohan Gets Mad!!" (悟飯怒る!!, Gohan Ikaru!!); 249. "The Plot of the Lords" (動き始めた作戦, Ugoki Hajimeta Sakusen; lit. 'The Plan Goes into Motion'); 250. "The Stolen Energy" (奪われたエネルギー, Ubawareta Enerugī); 251. "The Terrible Mystery" (恐るべき謎, Osorubeki Nazo)
Goten and Trunks confront each other in the final. Trunks wins and is allowed to fight Hercule as a reward. Scared by Trunks' strength, Hercule pretends to allow Trunks to defeat him. The adults' tournament starts, and both Goten and Trunks knock out the fighter Mighty Mask (マイティマスク, Maiti Masuku) in order to use his costume to participate in the adults' tournament. Piccolo forfeits his fight when he faces Kaiō-shin, who is the universe's lord of lords. In the third fight, Videl fights against a man named Spopovich who has gained abnormal powers. Spopovich easily defeats Videl and almost kills her in the process. In the fourth fight, Gohan faces Kaiō-shin's guardian, Kibito (キビト), but he is attacked by Spopovich and his partner Yamu, who steal his energy and place it in a bottle. Both men escape, and Kaiō-shin asks Goku and the other to follow him. While following Yamu and Spopovich, Kaiō-shin explains that the warlock Bobbidi plans to awake a powerful monster known as Boo the Djinn, but he first needs to absorb the energy from powerful warriors.
22	Mark of the Warlock (The Fated Showdown: Son Goku vs Vegeta!!); Shukumei no Taiketsu Son Gokū Tai Bejiita (宿命の対決 孫悟空対ベジータ)	August 4, 1994; 978-4-08-851497-0	October 10, 2005; 978-1-4215-0051-5
252. "Bobbidi the Warlock" (魔導師バビディ, Madōshi Babidi); 253. "The Evil Masters" (知っていたバビディ, Shitte Ita Babidi; lit. 'Bobbidi Knows'); 254. "The Descent" (虎穴に入らずんば..., Koketsu ni Irazunba...; lit. 'One Must Enter the Tiger's Den...'); 255. "Stage One: Focus" (ゲーム, Geimu; lit. 'The Game'); 256. "Stage Two: Yakon" (ステージ2のヤコン, Suteiji Tsū no Yakon); 257. "Yakon's Treat" (魔獣ヤコンのごちそう, Majū Yakon no Gochisō; lit. 'The Demon Beast Yakon's Feast'); 258. "Battle Royale" (ダーブラ登場!!, Dābura Tōjō!!; lit. 'Dabra Takes the Stage!!'); 259. "Mighty Mask Shows His Power!" (決勝戦の行方, Kesshōsen no Yukue; lit. 'The Fate of the Finals'); 260. "We Have a Winner!!" (勝者決定!!!, Shōsha Kettei!!!); 261. "A Wicked Soul Revealed" (みつけられた邪心, Mitsukerareta Jashin); 262. "Goku vs. Vegeta" (宿命の対決孫悟空対ベジータ, Shukumei no Taiketsu Son Gokū Tai Bejīta; lit. 'The Fated Showdown: Son Goku vs Vegeta'); 263. "Vegeta's Pride" (ベジータのプライド, Bejīta no Puraido); 264. "Two Battles to the Death" (ふたつの死闘, Futatsu no Shitō); 265. "Countdown" (カウントダウン, Kauntodaun)
Goku and his friends arrive at Bobbidi's base, but are then attacked by his servant Dabra, who kills Kibito and petrifies Kuririn and Piccolo. As they enter the hideout, Goku and Vegeta easily defeat their respective enemies, while Dabra prepares to fight Gohan. Meanwhile, the tournament continues, and Goten and Trunks are disqualified for stealing Mighty Mask's costume. #18 allows Hercule to defeat her, but only if he gives her double the amount of money the winner gets. Gohan faces Dabra, but the latter escapes to tell Bobbidi that they can control Vegeta since he is evil. Vegeta allows them to control him to make him stronger and starts fighting against Goku. Gohan and Kaiō-shin find Dabra and Bobbidi, but Boo awakes because he is receiving Goku's energy.
23	Boo Unleashed! (Farewell, Pride-filled Warrior); Saraba Hokori Takaki Senshi (さらば誇り高き戦士)	December 2, 1994; 978-4-08-851498-7	December 5, 2005; 978-1-4215-0148-2
266. "The Djinn Awakens?!" (魔人ブウ出現か!?, Majin Bū Shutsugen ka!?; lit. 'Majin Boo Appears?!'); 267. "Can This Be Boo?!" (こいつが魔人ブウ!?, Koitsu ga Majin Bū!?); 268. "The Menace of Boo" (魔人ブウの脅威, Majin Bū no Kyōi); 269. "Terrifying Power" (圧倒敵な不気味パワー, Attōteki na Bukimi Pawā); 270. "Vegeta vs. Boo" (ベジータ最後の決死戦, Bejīta Saigo no Kesshisen; lit. 'Vegeta's Final Deathmatch'); 271. "Boo Gets Mad" (怒る魔人ブウ, Ikaru Majin Bū); 272. "The Mastermind's Demise" (黒幕の最後, Kuromaku no Saigo); 273. "Farewell, Proud Warrior" (さらば誇り高き戦士, Saraba Hokori Takaki Senshi); 274. "Back to the Nightmare" (悪夢ふたたび, Akumu Futatabi); 275. "A Slim Hope" (かすかな希望, Kasuka na Kibō); 276. "Bobbidi's Revenge" (バビディの復讐作戦はじまる!!, Babidi no Fukushū Sakusen Hajimaru!!; lit. 'Bobbidi's Revenge Plan Gets Started!!'); 277. "A Time of Trial" (試練の時, Shiren no Toki); 278. "The Zeta Sword" (ゼットソード, Zetto Sōdo; lit. 'The Z Sword')
Boo awakes as a dangerous obese creature that easily defeats Gohan and Kaiō-shin. Dabra tries to destroy him, but he is killed by being turned into a cookie and eaten by Boo. After knocking Goku out, Vegeta appears to defeat Boo, but Boo regenerates after receiving all of his attacks. When Boo tortures Vegeta, Trunks and Goten save him. Vegeta then knocks both of the children out and gives them to Piccolo, who returned with Kuririn to their normal state, to escape. Vegeta self-destructs in an attempt to kill Boo, but he manages to regenerate. Bobbidi and Boo start looking for Piccolo, Goten and Trunks by killing citizens. Goku returns to Kami-sama's place, where he decides to teach Goten and Trunks a technique to fuse their bodies and defeat Boo. Meanwhile, Gohan is taken by Kaiō-shin and Kibito, who was revived by Shenlong, to their planet to train with the legendary Zeta Sword.
24	Hercule to the Rescue (The Earth Army's Last Secret Weapon!!); Chikyūgun, Saigo no Himitsu Heiki!! (地球軍、最後の秘密兵器！！)	March 3, 1995; 978-4-08-851499-4	February 7, 2006; 978-1-4215-0273-1
279. "Goku Meets Boo!!" (孫悟空魔人ブウに接触!, Son Gokū Majin Bū ni Sesshoku!); 280. "Super Saiyan Level 3!!!" (限界!!超サイヤ人3, Rimitto!! Sūpā Saiyajin Surī; lit. 'The Limit!! Super Saiyan 3'); 281. "Boo Unbound" (見え始めた魔人ブウの真価, Mie Hajimeta Majin Bū no Shinka; lit. 'Majin Boo Begins to See His True Worth'); 282. "Goku's Time" (孫悟空の残された時間, Son Gokū no Nokosareta Jikan; lit. 'Son Goku's Remaining Time'); 283. "Goku Goes Back" (孫悟空帰る, Son Gokū Kaeru); 284. "Where is Gohan?" (孫悟飯の行方, Son Gohan no Yukue; lit. 'Son Gohan's Whereabouts'); 285. "The Zeta Sword" (ゼットソードともうひとりの界王神, Zetto Sōdo to Mō Hitori no Kaiōshin; lit. 'The Z Sword and Another Kaiō-shin'); 286. "The Fusion Succeeds...?!" (ついにできたフュージョン!!, Tsui ni Dekita Fyūjon!!; lit. 'The Fusion is Completed at Last!!'); 287. "The Earth's Secret Weapon!" (地球軍、最後の秘密兵器!!, Chikyūgun, Saigo no Himitsu Heiki!!); 288. "Super Fusion!" (いよいよ完成!超フュージョン!!, Iyoiyo Kansei! Sūpā Fyūjon!!; lit. 'Perfected at Last! Super Fusion!!'); 289. "The Friends of the Djinn" (魔人ブウと仲間たち, Majin Bū to Nakamatachi; lit. 'Majin Boo and Friends'); 290. "The Creature of Wrath" (怒りの産み出したもの, Ikari no Umidashita Mono); 291. "Two Boos?!" (ふたりの魔人ブウ...そして..., Futari no Majin Bū... Soshite...; lit. 'The Two Majin Boos... And Then...')
To avoid the Dragon Radar's destruction, Goku confronts Boo to give Trunks time to find it. When Goku escapes, Boo kills Bobbidi after tiring of being ordered around. Goku teaches Goten and Trunks the fusion dance, but he is forced to return to the afterlife, where he meets up with Gohan. Wanting to test the Z Sword, Goku accidentally breaks it, awakening an ancient Kaiō-shin who starts performing a 24-hour ritual to make Gohan stronger. Goten and Trunks succeed in performing the fusion dance and form a warrior called Gotenks (ゴテンクス, Gotenkusu), who still needs to train to defeat Boo. Hercule goes to confront Boo, but instead becomes his friend and makes Boo swear that he will never kill people again. However, Boo's dog is shot by a bandit, causing him to create a thin Boo made up of his evil feelings that turns the obese one into chocolate. The thin Boo then eats the chocolate and transforms into a new and stronger Super Boo.
25	Last Hero Standing! (Do Your Best, Super Gotenks-kun); Ganbare Sūpā Gotenkusukun (がんばれ 超ゴテンクスくん)	June 2, 1995; 978-4-08-851500-7	April 4, 2006; 978-1-4215-0404-9
292. "The New, Terrible Boo" (恐怖の新魔人ブウ, Kyōfu no Shin Majin Bū); 293. "Humanity's End" (人類絶滅, Jinrui Zetsumetsu); 294. "Return to the Room of Spirit and Time" (トランクスと悟天精神と時の部屋に入る, Torankusu to Goten Seishin to Toki no Heya ni Hairu; lit. 'Trunks and Goten Enter the Room of Spirit and Time'); 295. "The Confidence of Gotenks!!" (ゴテンクスに自身あり!!, Gotenkusu ni Jishin Ari!!); 296. "The Extreme Confidence of Gotenks!!" (ゴテンクス自身満々!!, Gotenkusu Jishin Manman!!); 297. "The Kamikaze Ghost!" (必殺!カミカゼアタック, Hissatsu! Kamikaze Atakku; lit. 'Surefire! Kamikaze Attack'); 298. "The Door Closes" (閉じられた異次元世界, Tojirareta Ijigen Sekai; lit. 'The Alternate Dimension is Sealed Off'); 299. "Escape From the Time Dimension" (異次元からの脱出, Ijigen kara no Dasshutsu; lit. 'Escape from the Alternate Dimension'); 300. "Super Gotenks!" (がんばれ超ゴテンクスくん, Ganbare Sūpā Gotenkusukun; lit. 'Do Your Best, Super Gotenks-kun'); 301. "Super Fusion Unleashed!!" (強いぞ!!スーパーフュージョン, Tsuyoi zo!! Sūpā Fyūjon; lit. 'He's So Strong!! The Super Fusion'); 302. "Deep Trouble!!" (絶体絶命大大大ピンチ!!, Zettai Zetsumei Daidaidaipinchi!!; lit. 'An Absolutely Deadly Big-Big-Big Pinch!!'); 303. "Gohan's Counterattack!" (孫悟飯の大逆襲!!, Son Gohan no Daigyakushū!!); 304. "What's Boo Doing?!" (魔人ブウの不気味な動き, Majin Bū no Bukimi na Ugoki; lit. 'Majin Boo's Odd Behavior'); 305. "Ambush!" (罠, Wana); 306. "A Turn of the Tables" (大逆転, Daigyakuten; lit. 'The Great Reversal'); 307. "Enter a Savior?!" (救世主登場!?, Kyūseishu Tōjō!?); 308. "Will the Potara Prevail?!" (成功するか!?ポタラの合体!, Seikō Suru ka!? Potara no Gattai!; lit. 'Is This Gonna Work?! The Potara Fusion!')
The new Boo finds Kami-sama's palace and faces Gotenks in the Room of Spirit and Time. Gotenks starts performing weak techniques to make the battle dramatic, causing Piccolo to destroy the Room's door. Boo creates a hole in the dimension and returns to Kami-sama's where he turns everyone into chocolate before murdering them. Gotenks manages to escape alongside Piccolo, and continues facing Boo. He is then able to overpower Boo, but before he can defeat him, the fusion ends. Gohan returns, and fights against Boo. Gohan is able to overwhelm Boo, who self-destructs himself and regenerates later. Gotenks tries to face Boo again, but he is absorbed along with Piccolo. Having absorbed Gotenks, Boo is now able to surpass Gohan. The old Kaiō-shin gives his remaining life energy to Goku, along with two earrings that will allow him to fuse with Gohan. Goku attempts to give an earring to Gohan, but Gohan is absorbed by Boo before he and Goku can fuse.
26	Goodbye, Dragon World! (Bye Bye Dragon World); Baibai Doragon Wārudo (バイバイ ドラゴンワールド)	August 4, 1995; 978-4-08-851090-3	June 6, 2006; 978-1-4215-0636-4
309. "The Ultimate Combination!!" (孫悟空最後の合体!!, Son Gokū Saigo no Gattai!!; lit. 'Son Goku's Final Fusion!!'); 310. "The Ultimate Fighter" (天下無敵の合体おとうさん, Tenkamuteki no Gattai Otōsan; lit. 'The Fused Fathers are Unrivaled'); 311. "Vegerot's Game" (挑発するベジット, Chōhatsu Suru Bejitto; lit. 'Vegetto the Instigator'); 312. "Two Inside Boo" (ブウの中の悟空とベジータ, Bū no Naka no Gokū to Bejīta; lit. 'Goku and Vegeta Inside of Boo'); 313. "Boos Inside Boo" (ブウの中のブウとブウ, Bū no Naka no Bū to Bū; lit. 'Boo and Boo Inside of Boo'); 314. "The Boo of Pure Evil" (純粋の魔人ブウ, Junsui no Majin Bū; lit. 'The Pure Majin Boo'); 315. "Battle for the Universe" (全宇宙を賭けた試合, Zen'uchū o Kaketa Shiai); 316. "Vegeta and Kakarrot" (ベジータとカカロット, Bejīta to Kakarotto); 317. "Vegeta Puts His Life on the Line!" (命懸けのベジータ, Inochigake no Bejīta); 318. "The End of Super Saiyan 3" (超サイヤ人3消える, Sūpā Saiyajin Surī Kieru); 319. "Vegeta's Plan" (ベジータの考え, Bejīta no Kangae); 320. "A Message to Earth" (蘇った地球人へのメッセージ, Yomigaetta Chikyūjin e no Messeiji; lit. 'A Message for the Revived People of Earth'); 321. "Just Not Enough" (集まらない元気玉の元気, Atsumaranai Genkidama no Genki; lit. 'Energy Won't Gather for the Genki-Dama'); 322. "Battle's End" (決着, Ketchaku; lit. 'Conclusion'); 323. "A Happy Ending... And Then..." (大団円そして..., Daidan'en Soshite...; lit. 'A Grand Finale, And Then...'); 324. "10 Years After" (そして10年後, Soshite Jūnengo); 325. "Farewell, Dragon World!" (バイバイドラゴンワールド, Baibai Doragon Wārudo; lit. 'Bye Bye Dragon World')
Goku fuses with Vegeta, who has been allowed to return to Earth. They form a powerful warrior named Vegerot (ベジット, Bejitto) who easily defeats Boo, but allows Boo to absorb him so that he can free Gohan and the others. As he enters Boo's body, Vegerot suddenly defuses. Goku and Vegeta find and free Gohan, Goten, Trunks and Piccolo. As they also free the obese Boo, the current Boo undergoes a new transformation that turns him into a child-like Boo. The original Boo proceeds to destroy the Earth, killing Gohan, Goten, Trunks and Piccolo. However, Goku and Vegeta are able to escape to Kaiō-shin's planet along with Dende and Hercule. Goku prepares to face the original Boo, who regenerates and teleports to the Kaiō-shin planet. However, Goku is unable to control his powers, and Vegeta and the obese Boo distract the current Boo to buy Goku time to recover. Vegeta tells Dende to use Porunga to restore the Earth and revive all of its inhabitants, which will allow Goku to absorb their energies to perform the Super Genki-Dama. With help from the obese Boo and Hercule, Goku is able to prepare the Super Genki-Dama and uses it to kill Kid Boo once and for all. Goku then returns to live with his family and friends and 10 years later, he enters himself into the 28th Tenka'ichi Budōkai. There, he confronts Boo's reincarnation, a young boy named Oob. Goku, impressed by Oob's power, decides to train him so that he will one day become Goku's replacement as the protector of Earth.
