= List of Dragon Ball Z Kai episodes =

Japanese promotional poster for Dragon Ball Z Kai

Dragon Ball Z Kai (Note: Known in Japan as simply Dragon Ball Kai (ドラゴンボール改, Doragon Bōru Kai; lit. 'Dragon Ball Revised')) is a recut and remastered version of the long-running sequel anime television series Dragon Ball Z, produced to commemorate its 20th anniversary. The series was produced by Toei Animation with the intention of creating a revised version of Dragon Ball Z with re-recorded dialogue, improved animation cel quality, and omission of most anime-exclusive content not found in the Z-covered half of Akira Toriyama's original Dragon Ball manga. The series was originally broadcast in Japan on Fuji Television and its affiliates from April 5, 2009, to March 27, 2011. (Note: The 2009–2011 run of Dragon Ball Z Kai adapts chapters 195–420 of the manga's original Japanese release.) The series returned in 2014, running for an additional 61 episodes in Japan from April 6, 2014, to June 28, 2015, and 69 episodes internationally. (Note: The 2014–2015 run of Dragon Ball Z Kai adapts chapters 421–519 of the manga's original Japanese release.) The international version of the 2014 series was titled Dragon Ball Z Kai: The Final Chapters by Toei Animation Europe and Funimation, and had initially only been earmarked for broadcast outside of Japan.

Kai features remastered high-definition picture, sound, and special effects as well as a re-recorded voice track by most of the original cast. As most of the series' sketches and animation cels had been discarded since the final episode of Dragon Ball Z in 1996, new frames were produced by digitally tracing over still frames from existing footage and filling them with softer colors. This reduced visible damage to the original animation. To convert the 4:3 animation to 16:9 widescreen, some shots were selectively cropped while others feature new hand-drawn portions; an uncropped 4:3 version was made available on home video and international releases for the first 98 episodes. Some countries would also air it in 4:3. Much of the anime-original material that was not featured in the manga was cut from Kai (ultimately abridging the 291 episodes of Dragon Ball Z down to 159 in Japan and 167 internationally).

The first DVD and Blu-ray compilation was released in Japan on September 18, 2009. Individual volumes and Blu-ray box sets were released monthly. France was the first country to release all 167 episodes of the series on DVD and Blu-ray. The home media releases of The Final Chapters contain a Japanese audio track for all episodes, including those that were never broadcast in Japan.

== Series overview ==
Saga	Episodes		Originally aired	
Saga	Episodes		First aired	Last aired
Saiyan	18		April 5, 2009	August 9, 2009
Frieza	36		August 16, 2009	April 5, 2010
Androids and Cell	28		May 2, 2010	November 21, 2010
Cell Games	16		November 28, 2010	March 27, 2011
World Tournament	17 (JP)	24 (Int.) (Note: The international cut of the Buu Saga (The Final Chapters) features 8 episodes worth of extra footage that was removed in the Japanese cut. The episodes listed without a Japanese title or airdate counterpart were cut to such a degree that they had to receive an exclusive international title.)	April 6, 2014	August 3, 2014
Majin Buu	18		August 10, 2014	December 7, 2014
Evil Buu	26 (JP)	27 (Int.)	December 14, 2014	June 28, 2015

== Episodes ==
=== Saiyan Saga (2009) ===
No. overall	No. in saga	English translated title / English dub title	Corresponding DBZ ep. (Note: Represents where the Dragon Ball Z episode footage was taken from in relation to each Kai episode. The A and B notation respectively denotes the first and second episode segments (uninterrupted footage broken up by a TV advert) of the Z episode.)	Original release date	American air date
1	1	"The Curtain Rises for Battle! The Return of Son Goku" / "Prologue to Battle! The Return of Goku!"; Transliteration: "Tatakai no Makuake! Kaette Kita zo Son Gokū" (Japanese: 闘いの幕開け! 帰ってきたぞ孫悟空)	DBZ SP1 and 1–2A	April 5, 2009	May 24, 2010
The series begins with a flashback where Bardock's failure to prevent the destruction of Planet Vegeta at the hands of Frieza, and the upbringing of Bardock's son Goku on Earth as depicted in the original Dragon Ball series. Five years have passed since Goku's victory over Piccolo at the 23rd World Martial Arts Tournament, and he has since married Chi-Chi and now has a son named Gohan. Goku and Gohan are heading towards a reunion with Goku's friends at Master Roshi's island. Elsewhere, an odd-looking spacecraft crash-lands on Earth. A man in battle armor emerges from the vessel and flies off to scout out a powerful life form he locates with the help of an apparatus on his eye. Piccolo is nearly killed by the stranger, but this is averted when the man leaves to scout out a more powerful life form. The other strong life form is Goku, who at the Kame House presents his son to Roshi, Krillin, and Bulma. The stranger arrives and surprises everyone when they notice he has a monkey-like tail, just like Goku used to have.
2	2	"The Enemy is Goku's Brother?! The Secret of the Mighty Saiyan Warriors!"; Transliteration: "Teki wa Gokū no Ani!? Saikyō Senshi Saiyajin no Himitsu" (Japanese: 敵は悟空の兄!? 最強戦士サイヤ人の秘密)	2B–3	April 12, 2009	May 24, 2010
The stranger says that his name is Raditz, and that he is Goku's older brother. Goku cannot remember this, as he had suffered from brain damage caused by a fall when he was a baby. Raditz reports that he and Goku are of an alien race called the Saiyans from a planet called Vegeta and that he and Goku are among the last four remaining. Raditz then asks Goku to join them in exterminating the population of Earth, taking Gohan hostage when Goku refuses. Piccolo appears and offers to help Goku defeat Raditz; Goku accepts his offer, and together they follow after Raditz. Goku and Piccolo confront Raditz at his space pod's crash site, but Raditz is not impressed and tells them that the other two remaining Saiyans are even stronger than he is.
3	3	"Life or Death Battle! Goku and Piccolo's Fierce Suicidal Attack" / "A Life or Death Battle! Goku and Piccolo's Desperate Attack!"; Transliteration: "Inochi o Kaketa Tatakai! Gokū to Pikkoro Sutemi no Mōkō" (Japanese: 命をかけた闘い! 悟空とピッコロ捨て身の猛攻)	4–5	April 19, 2009	May 25, 2010
Goku and Piccolo are no match for Raditz in direct conflict, so they decide to have Goku distract Raditz while Piccolo gathers energy for an attack strong enough to defeat Raditz. This plan fails. Goku's attempt to stop Raditz by grabbing his tail ends when Goku gets tricked by his brother. Raditz tortures Goku, causing Gohan to unleash his latent abilities in a fit of rage, and he strikes Raditz in the chest. Goku uses this opportunity to grab Raditz from behind, allowing Piccolo to use his Makankosappo (Special Beam Cannon) technique on Raditz—killing them both. Before he succumbs to his wound, Raditz tells his enemies that the other Saiyans will arrive on Earth within a year. Bulma, Krillin, and Master Roshi arrive to witness Goku's death.
4	4	"Son Goku Runs in the Afterlife! The Million Kilometer Serpent Road" / "Run in the Afterlife, Goku! The One Million Mile Snake Way!"; Transliteration: "Anoyo de Hashire Son Gokū! Hyaku-man Kiro no Hebi no Michi" (Japanese: あの世で走れ孫悟空! 100万キロの蛇の道)	6-7A	April 26, 2009	May 25, 2010
Kami takes Goku along with his body to the Other World. Bulma takes Raditz's scouter to repair it and find Yamcha, Tien Shinhan, and Chiaotzu. Piccolo takes Gohan into his custody and flies off, intending to train Gohan in preparation for the two Saiyans' arrival. In Other World, Kami arranges for Goku to be allowed to travel to King Kai via the million-kilometer-long (Note: In the dub, Snake Way is 1,000,000 miles (1,609,000 km)) Snake Way; King Kai will then train Goku in advanced fighting techniques, in hopes that by the time he is re-animated Goku will be strong enough to face the new Saiyans who are heading towards Earth. While Goku starts his journey along the long road, Krillin unsuccessfully attempts to tell Chi-Chi of her husband's death and her son's kidnapping. Meanwhile, Piccolo tells Gohan of his father's fate. Gohan doubts that he has any significant intrinsic power, so Piccolo uses a dramatic method to demonstrate Gohan's hidden power—he throws Gohan at a rock, which Gohan destroys reflexively.
5	5	"Wilderness Survival! A Moonlit Night Awakens Gohan!"; Transliteration: "Kōya no Sabaibaru! Tsukiyo ga Gohan o Yobisamasu" (Japanese: 荒野のサバイバル! 月夜が悟飯を呼び覚ます)	7B–8	May 3, 2009	May 26, 2010
Gohan's survival training begins. After a length of time spent alone on a mountaintop, Gohan looks at the full moon, which causes him to transform into a Great Ape. Rather than let him rampage unchecked, Piccolo destroys the moon, making any further transformations impossible for both Gohan and the other Saiyans, and removes Gohan's Saiyan tail before leaving to begin his own training. Meanwhile, Bulma repairs the scouter, and Yajirobe delivers a summons to Krillin, telling him that the two of them, along with Yamcha, Tien, and Chiaotzu, are to report to Kami's Lookout for training.
6	6	"Finally Arriving at the End! Kaio-sama's Playful Test" / "The End of Snake Way! King Kai's Bizarre Test!"; Transliteration: "Tadori Tsuita Shūten! Kaiō-sama no Ochame na Shiren" (Japanese: 辿り着いた終点! 界王様のおちゃめな試練)	11A, 14, 17, and 18B–19A	May 10, 2009	May 26, 2010
Six months have passed since Gohan's incident with the full moon, and he has since become much more adept at surviving in the wilderness. Piccolo then begins training him personally in martial arts. Meanwhile, Goku has arrived at the end of Snake Way, meeting King Kai on his planet, which, despite its small size, has ten times Earth's gravity. For Goku to train under King Kai's teachings, he must attempt to make the master laugh. After Goku accomplishes making him laugh, King Kai tells Goku to catch his pet monkey, Bubbles. This proves to be a difficult task for Goku due to the planet's intense gravity, but he is persistent and refuses to give up.
7	7	"Battle with 10-Fold Gravity! Goku, Your Training is a Footrace" / "The Battle with Ten-Times Gravity! Goku's Race Against the Clock!"; Transliteration: "Jū-bai Jūryoku to Tatakae! Gokū yo Shugyō wa Kakekko da" (Japanese: 10倍重力と闘え! 悟空よ修行はかけっこだ)	19B–20	May 17, 2009	May 27, 2010
After three weeks, Goku succeeds in catching Bubbles. He is then issued his second challenge: to hit Gregory, the flying grasshopper, with a large mallet. After two weeks of trying, Goku succeeds and fully masters the planet's gravity in the process. King Kai then proceeds to teach Goku his signature technique: the Kaio-ken. On Earth, Gohan's training with Piccolo comes to a close, while the rest of the Z Fighters finish their training with Kami and go their separate ways.
8	8	"Come Forth, Shenlong! The Saiyans Finally Arrive on Earth" / "Shenron Appears! The Saiyans Arrive Sooner than Expected!"; Transliteration: "Ide yo Shenron! Saiyajin Tsui ni Chikyū Tōchaku" (Japanese: いでよ神龍(シェンロン)! サイヤ人ついに地球到着)	21	May 24, 2009	May 27, 2010
King Kai has also taught Goku the Spirit Bomb technique, and tests Goku's ability to create a Spirit Bomb with a large brick as a target; Goku destroys it with no problems. However, King Kai warns Goku of the potential danger of creating a Spirit Bomb on Earth. Goku decides to only use it as a last resort. With his training complete, Goku is ready to be resurrected. Only then is it revealed that the Saiyans will be arriving sooner than expected; additionally, King Kai had forgotten to allow sufficient time for Goku to travel back along Snake Way to reach Earth before the Saiyans arrive there. Goku sends an urgent telepathic message to Master Roshi via King Kai's telepathy, insisting that the Dragon Balls be used to resurrect him posthaste. On Earth, Roshi, Bulma, and Oolong summon the Eternal Dragon Shenron and fulfill Goku's wish. Goku then begins the long journey back along Snake Way; with all of his training, the return journey will take two days. The next day, the Saiyans Vegeta and Nappa land on Earth to begin their search for the Dragon Balls.
9	9	"Yamucha's Struggle! The Terrifying Saibaimen" / "Yamcha's Struggle! The Terrible Saibamen!"; Transliteration: "Yamucha Funtō! Osoru Beshi Saibaiman" (Japanese: ヤムチャ奮闘! おそるべし栽培マン)	22–23	May 31, 2009	June 1, 2010
Vegeta and Nappa emerge from their two space pods, and Nappa wipes out Metro East with a single blast. The two Saiyans then fly off towards the island where Piccolo and Gohan have been training. Krillin arrives first, and the three face off with Vegeta and Nappa. Piccolo learns for the first time that he is a Namekian, a member of an alien race from the planet called Namek, when told by Nappa. At Vegeta's order, Nappa plants seeds in the ground, and six Saibamen are born. Tien, Chiaotzu, and then Yamcha fly in to join in the battle. Vegeta suggests they have a game of one-on-one and instructs the Saibamen to use all of their power during their fights. Tien faces off first against a Saibaman. Tien overpowers the Saibaman, but before he can finish it off, Vegeta accuses the Saibaman of having held back his full power and subsequently destroys one of the Saibamen as an incentive to the remaining five to obey the order to use their full strength. Next, Yamcha decides to fight in place of Krillin; the Saibaman latches onto him and self-destructs, killing Yamcha.
10	10	"Wait, Chaozu! Tenshinhan's Screaming Kikōhō" / "Sit Tight, Chiaotzu! Tien's Screaming Tri-Beam!"; Transliteration: "Matte ro Chaozu! Tenshinhan Zekkyō no Kikōhō" (Japanese: 待ってろ餃子! 天津飯絶叫の気功砲)	24–25	June 7, 2009	June 2, 2010
Nappa faces off against the Z Fighters and proves to be a formidable opponent. During Nappa's attack, Tien loses his arm. In an act of desperation, Chiaotzu attaches himself to Nappa's back and sacrifices himself using a kamikaze technique, but Nappa is unharmed by it. Grief-stricken by Chiaotzu's sacrifice, Tien uses his Tri-Beam technique on Nappa, but this also fails, and Tien dies of exhaustion as a result. With the Z Fighters now down three, the team can do nothing but hope for Goku's arrival, which is expected in three hours. The Saiyans soon learn of this trump card and scoff at the notion that any one new fighter could change the course of the battle, until Krillin informs the duo of Goku's special training. Intrigued by the possibility of challenging a newly-strengthened Goku, Vegeta issues a three-hour reprieve to wait for Goku to arrive.
11	11	"Will Son Goku Make It?! The Battle Resumes in 3 Hours" / "Will Goku Make it in Time?! Three Hours Until the Battle Resumes!"; Transliteration: "Maniau ka Son Gokū!? Sentō Saikai Made Sanjikan" (Japanese: 間に合うか孫悟空!? 戦闘再開まで3時間)	26–27	June 14, 2009	June 3, 2010
Goku fails to arrive within the three-hour reprieve, and the battle with the Saiyans resumes. At that moment, however, Goku finally reaches the end of Snake Way, is teleported back to Earth by Kami, and flies towards the battlefield on the Nimbus Cloud. Upon sensing Goku's impending arrival on his scouter and discovering that Goku's power level is now far greater than before, Vegeta orders Nappa to kill the remaining Z Fighters, including Piccolo. The Saiyans reveal that they came to Earth for the specific purpose of obtaining and using Earth's Dragon Balls, which they learned about by monitoring Raditz's conversations while he was on Earth. Vegeta says that he and Nappa can later go to Planet Namek and use the original Namekian Dragon Balls to wish for immortality for themselves, since the Namekians were the creators of the original Dragon Balls. After Gohan strikes Nappa, an enraged Nappa fires a powerful ki blast at Gohan, but Piccolo jumps in the way at the last second to shield Gohan from the blast.
12	12	"The Tears Piccolo Shed... Son Goku's Furious Counterattack!" / "Farewell, Piccolo! Goku's Furious Counterattack!"; Transliteration: "Pikkoro ga Nagashita Namida... Son Gokū Ikari no Dai-Hangeki!" (Japanese: ピッコロが流した涙…孫悟空怒りの大反撃!)	28–29A	June 21, 2009	June 7, 2010
Piccolo dies from Nappa's ki blast, resulting in Kami's death and the destruction of Earth's Dragon Balls. However, Goku finally arrives at the battlefield just in time to save Gohan and Krillin. After healing the two with a Senzu bean from Korin, Goku engages Nappa in battle. Despite the mighty Nappa's efforts, it quickly becomes clear that he is no match for Goku's new level of power. Realizing this, Vegeta orders Nappa to step down and finally decides to step into the fight.
13	13	"This is the Kaio-Ken!! A Battle to the Limit of Goku vs. Vegeta" / "The Power of the Kaio-Ken! Goku vs. Vegeta!"; Transliteration: "Kore ga Kaiō-Ken da!! Genkai Batoru no Gokū tai Bejīta" (Japanese: これが界王拳だ!! 限界バトルの悟空VSベジータ)	29B–30	June 28, 2009	June 8, 2010
With Vegeta ready to enter the fight, Nappa realizes that he has lost, and decides to attack Gohan and Krillin instead. However, Goku disables Nappa by using his new Kaio-ken technique. With his partner now useless, Vegeta launches Nappa into the sky and mercilessly kills him with a powerful ki blast. Goku tells Gohan and Krillin to leave so he can fight Vegeta without distraction. After moving to a new battleground, the two remaining Saiyans begin their epic battle. However, Vegeta is much more powerful than Nappa was, and Goku eventually realizes that even the two-times Kaio-ken isn't enough to defeat his opponent. He then decides to break his promise to King Kai and risk his own life to use the three-times Kaio-ken.
14	14	"Kamehameha Clash! Vegeta's Tenacious Transformation" / "An All-Out Kamehame-Ha! Vegeta's Terrible Transformation!"; Transliteration: "Gekitotsu Kamehameha! Bejīta Shūnen no Dai-Henshin" (Japanese: 激突かめはめ波! ベジータ執念の大変身)	31–32A	July 5, 2009	June 9, 2010
Goku powers up with the three-times Kaio-ken and attacks Vegeta with his increased power and speed. Vegeta is filled with rage as he realizes that Goku's power level exceeds his own, so he powers up even further and attempts to destroy Earth with his Galick Gun technique. Goku counters this attack with his Kamehameha blast, and when it turns out that they are evenly matched, he uses the four-times Kaio-ken to overcome Vegeta's blast, sending Vegeta flying into the outer atmosphere. Vegeta then searches for the moon to transform into a Great Ape and increase his power level. Realizing the moon has been destroyed, Vegeta releases a ball of ki that simulates the moon, and absorbs its Blutz Waves to transform into a Great Ape, which multiplies his power level by 10 times in the process. Krillin and Gohan sense Vegeta's increased power and decide to return to help Goku.
15	15	"Goku in Absolute Peril! Entrust Your Wishes to the Genki-Dama" / "Goku on the Ropes! Pin Your Hopes on the Spirit Bomb!"; Transliteration: "Zettai Zetsumei no Gokū! Genki-Dama ni Negai o Takuse" (Japanese: 絶体絶命の悟空! 元気玉に願いを託せ)	32B–33	July 12, 2009	June 10, 2010
Goku uses Tien's Solar Flare technique to blind Great Ape Vegeta to buy time to create a Spirit Bomb, but Vegeta attacks Goku the instant he finishes gathering ki. Even in his battered state, Goku wounds Vegeta's eye, but Vegeta crushes Goku in his hand and breaks most of his bones in the process. While hiding, Gohan and Krillin watch the fight and try to come up with a plan to cut off Vegeta's tail. They fail, but while Vegeta gloats, Yajirobe seizes an opening and severs Vegeta's tail with his sword, causing Vegeta to revert into his original form. Vegeta then angrily confronts Gohan, who is reluctant to fight at first, until he gets support from Goku. Goku then entrusts Krillin with the remaining ki from the previous Spirit Bomb, and Krillin successfully molds it into another Spirit Bomb.
16	16	"The Invincible Vegeta Defeated! Son Gohan Summons a Miracle" / "Defeat the Invincible Vegeta! Work a Miracle, Gohan!"; Transliteration: "Datō Fujimi no Bejīta! Kiseki o Okose Son Gohan" (Japanese: 打倒不死身のベジータ! 奇跡を起こせ孫悟飯)	34–35A	July 19, 2009	June 14, 2010
Vegeta attacks Gohan with a barrage of energy blasts while Krillin attempts to lock the Spirit Bomb onto Vegeta's energy signature. Krillin throws the Spirit Bomb at Vegeta, but Vegeta dodges it at the last second. Following Goku's advice, Gohan rebounds the Spirit Bomb back at Vegeta; although Vegeta survives the hit, he is badly weakened by the attack. Before Vegeta can finish the Z Fighters off, however, Gohan's tail suddenly grows back, and Vegeta decides to eliminate him to prevent him from transforming into a Great Ape. Just then, Yajirobe ambushes Vegeta with his sword, injuring him. However, Vegeta is able to quickly overpower Yajirobe, defeating him. Following Goku's instructions, Gohan gazes into the artificial moon Vegeta had created earlier and transforms into a Great Ape. After being thrashed around by the Great Ape, Vegeta cuts off Gohan's tail in mid-air, but Gohan falls on top of him as he turns back to normal, crushing Vegeta to the brink of death. Finally defeated, Vegeta summons his space pod and attempts to escape, but Krillin grabs Yajirobe's sword and prepares to finish off Vegeta.
17	17	"Dawn of a Fierce Battle! The Star of Hope is Piccolo's Homeland!"; Transliteration: "Gekisen no Yoake... Kibō no Hoshi wa Pikkoro no Furusato" (Japanese: 激戦の夜明け…希望の星はピッコロの故郷)	35B–36	August 2, 2009	June 15, 2010
Before Krillin deals the final blow to Vegeta, Goku intercedes. He asks Krillin to allow Vegeta to live, as Goku wishes to train harder and challenge Vegeta again in honorable combat. Krillin reluctantly agrees, and Vegeta leaves Earth. Master Roshi, Bulma, Chi-Chi, and Korin fly to where Goku, Gohan, and Krillin are. They gather their injured and the bodies of their deceased friends, and set off to the hospital. Krillin informs them that Kami is a Namekian, and that the planet Namek should have more inhabitants able to create Dragon Balls. After brainstorming on how to get there in a reasonable amount of time, they realize that Nappa's space pod is still a working vessel. Bulma decides to run it through some tests and see if it is still viable.
18	18	"The Ship Resting in Yunzabit! Time to Blast Off for Planet Namek!"; Transliteration: "Yunzabitto ni Nemuru Uchūsen! Namekkusei e Iza Hasshin" (Japanese: ユンザビットに眠る宇宙船(ふね)! ナメック星へいざ発進)	37–38	August 9, 2009	June 16, 2010
Goku, Krillin, and Gohan are in the hospital recovering from the battle with Vegeta. Their friends and family come to visit. When the television is turned on, they see a report about Nappa's space pod. Bulma presses a button on the spaceship's remote control, which she thinks will summon it to them, but instead it self-destructs the pod. Before everyone gives up hope, Mr. Popo arrives and tells them that he knows of another spaceship—the Namekian ship that Kami used to come to Earth when he was a boy. Bulma reluctantly agrees to inspect it up in Yunzabit Heights with him. They realize the craft is voice-activated in the native Namekian language. Bulma converts the language to English in ten days and learns how to use the ship; Gohan and Krillin decide to accompany her on her journey to Namek to search for the Namekian Dragon Balls.

=== Frieza Saga (2009–10) ===
No. overall	No. in saga	English translated title / English dub title	Corresponding DBZ ep.	Original release date	American air date
19	1	"A Formidable New Enemy! Emperor of the Universe, Freeza" / "A Powerful New Foe! Frieza, Ruler of the Universe!"; Transliteration: "Arata Naru Kyōteki! Uchū no Teiō Furīza" (Japanese: 新たなる強敵! 宇宙の帝王フリーザ)	39–44	August 16, 2009	June 17, 2010
While on their journey to Namek, Gohan and Krillin practice image training. Meanwhile, Vegeta has landed on Planet Frieza No. 79, and after being healed from the injuries sustained on Earth, Kui tells him Frieza is currently on Namek attempting to retrieve the Dragon Balls. Vegeta is incensed and decides to chase Frieza to Namek to try to use the Dragon Balls for himself. After 34 days aboard Kami's old spaceship, Bulma, Krillin, and Gohan arrive on Namek. Bulma uses her radar and notices that four of the seven Dragon Balls are together already. Gohan senses an evil presence, but Bulma is more optimistic and believes that the Namekians probably are the ones who have them. They notice Vegeta's space pod fly overhead and land in the distance, along with a second space pod shortly thereafter. Vegeta discovers that Frieza's henchmen Zarbon and Dodoria are accompanying Frieza.
20	2	"Rebellion Against Freeza! Vegeta, Burning with Ambition" / "The Rebellion Against Frieza! Vegeta's Burning Ambition!"; Transliteration: "Furīza e no Hangyaku! Yabō ni Moeru Bejīta" (Japanese: フリーザへの反逆! 野望に燃えるベジータ)	45–46A	August 23, 2009	June 21, 2010
Frieza continues to collect the Namekian Dragon Balls. Kui chases Vegeta to Namek in a space pod, and Vegeta kills Kui. Meanwhile, Krillin and Gohan battle more of Frieza's minions, but not before Frieza's minions destroy the spaceship Gohan's party used to reach the planet. Back on Earth, Yajirobe delivers Korin's new batch of Senzu beans to Goku at the hospital. After eating one of the beans, making a complete recovery from his injuries in the process, Goku immediately prepares to journey towards Namek himself.
21	3	"Protect the Dragon Balls! The Namekian Offensive" / "Protect the Dragon Balls! The Namekians' All-Out Attack!"; Transliteration: "Mamore Doragon Bōru! Namekku-seijin Sōkōgeki" (Japanese: 守れドラゴンボール! ナメック星人総攻撃)	46B–47	August 30, 2009	June 22, 2010
Bulma's father Dr. Briefs has prepared a spaceship at the Capsule Corporation for Goku to travel to Namek in six days. The ship contains sophisticated battle training equipment, the most important of which is an artificial gravity device that allows for increasing the gravity in the ship up to 100 times Earth's gravity. Goku begins to train at 20-times Earth's gravity as he takes off for Namek. Meanwhile, the Namekians begin to fight back against Frieza's men; however, Zarbon and Dodoria prove too powerful. Discovering that their people are being located via their scouters, the Namekians destroy the scouters. Dodoria, filled with rage, vows to make the locals regret the day they ever crossed Frieza.
22	4	"Dodoria in Terrifying Hot Pursuit! Vegeta Learns the Truth" / "Dodoria's Terrifying Chase! A Truth Revealed to Vegeta!"; Transliteration: "Mōtsui Dodoria no Kyōfu! Bejīta ni Akasu Shinjitsu" (Japanese: 猛追ドドリアの恐怖! ベジータに明かす真実)	48–49	September 6, 2009	June 23, 2010
Krillin and Gohan save a young Namekian boy named Dende from Dodoria's attack. The three fly away and manage to hide from the pursuing Dodoria; shortly after this, he is attacked by Vegeta. The two fight briefly. Dodoria begs for his life, offering to tell Vegeta the true story of his home planet's destruction. Vegeta releases Dodoria from his grip, and Dodoria reveals that it was Frieza who destroyed Planet Vegeta out of fear for the Saiyan race's potential. Vegeta is furious at being lied to and being used by Frieza, and kills a fleeing Dodoria.
23	5	"Vegeta's Secret Maneuvering! The Tragic Attack Upon the Namekians" / "Vegeta's Covert Maneuvers! A Tragic Assault on the Namekians!"; Transliteration: "Anyaku no Bejīta! Namekku-seijin o Osō Higeki" (Japanese: 暗躍のベジータ! ナメック星人を襲う悲劇)	50–51A	September 13, 2009	June 24, 2010
During his time on Earth, Vegeta has learned to sense energy without needing a scouter; he senses Gohan, Krillin, and Dende in the distance. Gohan and Krillin lower their ki enough to avoid being detected further, but Dende does not know how to. Before Vegeta can home in on Dende's power, though, a giant Namekian fish appears, giving Vegeta the thought that it was the source of the ki he detected—he has not yet completely mastered all of the subtleties of sensing energy without a scouter. He later comes across a Namekian village and demands to be given the Dragon Ball. When the elder Namekian of the village denies him the Dragon Ball, Vegeta slays all the Namekians and finds the Dragon Ball in one of the huts. He then proceeds to throw it in a nearby lake so that Frieza and his men cannot find it. Meanwhile, Dende takes Krillin with him to see the Grand Elder of Namek.
24	6	"Resurrected Comrades! The Handsome Warrior Zarbon's Devilish Transformation" / "Friends Reborn! Zarbon's Hideous Transformation!"; Transliteration: "Yomigaeru Nakama-tachi! Bisenshi Zābon Akuma no Henshin" (Japanese: 甦る仲間たち! 美戦士ザーボン悪魔の変身)	51B–53A	September 20, 2009	June 28, 2010
Krillin and Dende continue their trek toward the Grand Elder's home, while Vegeta begins battling Frieza's right-hand man Zarbon. Vegeta appears to be winning when Zarbon reveals a transformation that powers him up immensely, shifting the battle in his favor. Meanwhile, King Kai informs Goku via telepathy that Yamcha, Tien, Chiaotzu, and Piccolo have arrived at his planet in the Other World to receive training, much as Goku did when he died. After learning that Frieza is the tyrant terrorizing Planet Namek, King Kai warns Goku to stay away at all costs as he fears that no one is powerful enough to defeat the mighty Frieza.
25	7	"Power Up for Kuririn! Freeza's Nagging Premonition" / "Power Up, Krillin! Frieza's Mounting Apprehension!"; Transliteration: "Pawā Appu da Kuririn! Ugomeku Furīza no Yokan" (Japanese: パワーアップだクリリン! うごめくフリーザの予感)	53B–54	September 27, 2009	June 29, 2010
Krillin and Dende arrive at the Grand Elder's location—a conspicuous tower out in the open—and are greeted by Nail, the strongest Namekian warrior and a bodyguard to the Elder. The Elder speaks with them about the Dragon Balls, his ailing health, and the need for someone to help his Namekian children. He telepathically reads Krillin's past and learns of the history of Kami, including how Piccolo is the evil portion of Kami that Kami shed in order to become the Guardian of Earth. The Elder also learns that Krillin's intentions are pure, and that he has dormant power, which the Elder awakens. Krillin's power increases dramatically, and he asks the Elder if Gohan can also have his dormant power awakened, to which the Elder replies yes. Meanwhile, Zarbon reports to Frieza that he has defeated Vegeta, even though Vegeta's corpse was not found. Frieza condemns Zarbon for destroying Vegeta, as he thinks Vegeta has a Dragon Ball hidden and needs Vegeta to reveal its location, so he sends Zarbon to retrieve Vegeta and bring him back to the ship to heal. Zarbon finds Vegeta still alive and places him in a rejuvenation chamber inside Frieza's spaceship.
26	8	"The Conspiracy Shatters! The Counterattack of Vegeta vs. Zarbon" / "The Scheme is Shattered! Vegeta Strikes Back at Zarbon!"; Transliteration: "Kudake Chire Inbō! Gyakushū no Bejīta tai Zābon" (Japanese: 砕け散れ陰謀! 逆襲のベジータVSザーボン)	55–57A	October 4, 2009	June 30, 2010
Vegeta is fully rejuvenated and conceives a plan to steal the five Dragon Balls that Frieza has been keeping. He severely damages the ship with a single blast and throws all five Dragon Balls out of the ship. Meanwhile, Krillin arrives back at the cave Bulma is hiding in with a Dragon Ball that the Grand Elder had given him. Both Vegeta and Zarbon have followed him; the two quickly begin battling over possession of the Dragon Ball. Meanwhile, Gohan heads toward the village Vegeta attacked, discovering that there is still a Dragon Ball there. Eventually, Zarbon is killed by Vegeta, and Gohan retrieves the Dragon Ball, which Vegeta had hidden in the lake, and begins heading back to Bulma and the camp.
27	9	"A Hair-Trigger Pinch! Gohan, Protect the Four-Star Ball" / "A Touch-and-Go Situation! Gohan, Protect the Four Star Ball!"; Transliteration: "Isshokusokuhatsu no Pinchi! Gohan yo Sūshinchū o Mamore" (Japanese: 一触即発のピンチ! 悟飯よ四星球(スーシンチュウ)を守れ)	57B–60A	October 11, 2009	July 1, 2010
Krillin surrenders his Dragon Ball to Vegeta after Zarbon is killed, knowing he stands little chance against Vegeta. While returning to his stashed Dragon Balls, Vegeta senses Gohan. Gohan also senses Vegeta, so he masks his ki and hides his newly found Dragon Ball. Vegeta eventually coaxes Gohan out but does not see the hidden Dragon Ball. Thinking he has all seven Dragon Balls, Vegeta lets Gohan live and takes off, after Vegeta delivers a knee to his stomach. After returning to the nearby Namekian lake, Vegeta realizes Gohan had taken his hidden Dragon Ball and goes berserk; to evade Vegeta, Bulma and the Dragon Ball taken by Gohan have moved to a new hiding spot. Meanwhile, Frieza is informed that the Ginyu Force, an elite fighting team, will be arriving shortly, bringing much-needed state-of-the-art scouters as well as extensive fighting strength. Goku continues his training at intense gravity levels within his spaceship.
28	10	"The Super Decisive Battle Draws Near! The Ginyu Special Squadron Has Arrived!" / "The Countdown to Battle Begins! Enter, the Ginyu Force!"; Transliteration: "Semaru Chō-Kessen! Ginyū Tokusentai Tadaima Sanjō!" (Japanese: 迫る超決戦! ギニュー特戦隊只今参上ッ!)	60B–61	October 18, 2009	July 7, 2010
Krillin takes Gohan to see the Grand Elder to have his inner power released. However, Vegeta senses them while they are flying toward the tower, and confronts them. Nail informs the trio of a powerful evil force approaching the planet. Vegeta knows it is the Ginyu Force, Frieza's five most elite henchmen. Reluctantly, Gohan and Krillin agree to ally with Vegeta to use the Dragon Balls to make Vegeta immortal so that he can defeat the Ginyu Force and Frieza more easily. Krillin, Gohan, and Vegeta rush to retrieve the Dragon Ball, which Gohan had left with Bulma (who wonders why Vegeta stole the Dragon Ball), and meanwhile, the Ginyu Force lands on the planet and meets up with Frieza. Goku completes his training at 100-times Earth's gravity on the way to Namek and discovers his results are much more impressive than he anticipated.
29	11	"The Special Squadron's Frontline Man! Break Gurd's Spell" / "First Up for the Ginyu Force! Guldo's Time Freeze!"; Transliteration: "Tokusentai no Ichibante! Gurudo no Jubaku o Uchi Kuzuse" (Japanese: 特戦隊の一番手! グルドの呪縛を打ち崩せ)	62–63	October 25, 2009	July 8, 2010
Vegeta, Krillin, and Gohan race to the remaining five Dragon Balls that Vegeta had hidden, in an attempt to grant Vegeta the wish of eternal life to stand a chance against the Ginyu Force. The Ginyu Force beats them there, and with speed and a time freeze, swipes the two remaining Dragon Balls. Captain Ginyu takes the seven Dragon Balls to Frieza and allows the other members to play Rock-Paper-Scissors to decide who gets to fight who. Krillin and Gohan fight Guldo first. After realizing that they are no easy match for him, Guldo paralyzes the two with his ESP-based technique. Vegeta, however, kills Guldo before any harm is done to the Earthlings, so Recoome decides he is next to fight against Vegeta. Meanwhile, Goku is ten minutes away from landing on Namek.
30	12	"The Hellish Recoome! Keep Me Entertained Vegeta-chan" / "The Nightmare Recoome! Come Out and Play, Vegeta!"; Transliteration: "Jigoku no Rikūmu! Tanoshimasero yo Bejīta-chan" (Japanese: 地獄のリクーム! 楽しませろよベジータちゃん)	64–65	November 1, 2009	July 14, 2010
Vegeta begins battling Recoome, the big brute of the Ginyu Force. While Vegeta inflicts some blows against Recoome, ultimately Recoome does not seem to be suffering any damage. Gohan and Krillin enter battle after Vegeta becomes too badly injured to continue fighting, but quickly find themselves similarly beaten and outclassed. Elsewhere, Frieza attempts to use the Dragon Balls, but nothing happens, prompting him to leave Ginyu to guard the balls while he himself goes to look for Namekians to tell him how to activate the Dragon Balls so he can use a wish to become immortal. Just when all seems lost in Vegeta, Krillin, and Gohan's fight with Recoome, Goku's Capsule Corporation ship finally touches down on Planet Namek.
31	13	"Son Goku Finally Arrives! Knock the Ginyu Special Squadron Around" / "Goku Arrives at Last! Take Down the Ginyu Force!"; Transliteration: "Son Gokū Tsuini Tōchaku! Kechirase Ginyū Tokusentai" (Japanese: 孫悟空ついに到着! 蹴散らせギニュー特戦隊)	66–68A	November 8, 2009	July 15, 2010
Goku enters the battle after giving Senzu beans to Krillin, Gohan, and Vegeta, and things quickly take a turn for the better. Recoome, charging up a deadly attack, is defeated by a single blow from Goku. Jeice and Burter leap into battle, trying a variety of techniques—none of which affect Goku. Burter is knocked out by a few swift attacks from Goku, as Jeice stares in awe at his latest opponent, having never faced someone so powerful. Vegeta comes to suspect that Goku has become the first "Super Saiyan" in over 1,000 years, but has difficulty accepting the idea that a "low-class" Saiyan like Goku could become a Super Saiyan more easily than an "elite-class" warrior like himself.
32	14	"The Star Performer Takes the Stage!? Captain Ginyu vs. Son Goku" / "The Star Player Appears! Ginyu vs. Goku!"; Transliteration: "Shin'uchi Tōjō!? Ginyū Taichō tai Son Gokū" (Japanese: 真打ち登場!? ギニュー隊長VS孫悟空)	68B–69	November 15, 2009	July 21, 2010
Goku tells Jeice to take the beaten Recoome and Burter and leave the planet forever. Jeice flees to Captain Ginyu and tells him what has happened. Ginyu has Frieza's men bury the Dragon Balls, then sets out with Jeice towards Goku. Meanwhile, Vegeta kills Burter and then Recoome. Krillin and Gohan realize that Frieza is heading towards the Grand Elder to obtain the password to summon the Namekian Dragon. Shortly after this, Ginyu and Jeice arrive to battle Goku. Goku tells Krillin and Gohan to leave. Vegeta tricks Goku and flies away, leaving Goku to fight alone. Goku and Captain Ginyu fight, and after a while Ginyu asks Goku to release his true power. Goku abides and begins to power up via the Kaio-ken.
33	15	"Son Goku at Full Power! The Terrified Ginyu Has Something Up His Sleeve!?" / "Full Power, Goku! Captain Ginyu's Desperate Attack!"; Transliteration: "Furu Pawā da Son Gokū! Ononoku Ginyū ni Hisaku Ari!?" (Japanese: フルパワーだ孫悟空! おののくギニューに秘策あり!?)	70–71A	November 22, 2009	July 22, 2010
Using the mighty Kaio-ken technique, Goku powers up to his maximum level, at a power level of 180,000—which is far greater than Ginyu had expected it to be. The Grand Elder unlocks Dende's hidden powers and sends him off to meet the Earthlings—the Elder has realized the Earth warriors do not know how to use the Namekian Dragon Balls—and Nail begins battling Frieza to stall for time while Dende travels. Frieza is shocked that Nail has a power level of 42,000, though he states that his power level in his current form is 530,000. Frieza decides to use only one-tenth of his power and only one arm to fight Nail. While Frieza is clearly the stronger of the two, he is surprised at Nail's ability to regenerate lost limbs, though this comes at the cost of his own power. Gohan and Krillin rescue Bulma from a dinosaur attack, and take the Dragon Radar to find where Frieza stashed the Dragon Balls. Ginyu makes the strange move of wounding himself and firing a strange beam at Goku.
34	16	"Surprise! Goku is Ginyu and Ginyu is Goku?!"; Transliteration: "Bikkuri! Gokū ga Ginyū de Ginyū ga Gokū!?" (Japanese: ビックリ! 悟空がギニューでギニューが悟空!?)	71B–73A	November 29, 2009	July 28, 2010
The beam Ginyu fires at Goku causes the two of them to switch bodies. Goku is now trapped in Ginyu's wounded body. Krillin and Gohan arrive at Frieza's ship and dig up the Dragon Balls. Ginyu, in Goku's body, and Jeice arrive back at the ship as well, but when Ginyu tries to power up, his level is only 23,000, far less than the 180,000 level Goku had before the body switch. Realizing that great strength requires unity of mind and body, Goku (in Ginyu's body) arrives and shouts to Krillin and Gohan that they can easily defeat Ginyu. Vegeta boasts that he is close to becoming a Super Saiyan, before killing Jeice.
35	17	"A Great Turnabout for Goku!? Super Shenlong, Come Out Right Now!" / "Goku's Comeback! Call Forth Porunga!"; Transliteration: "Gokū Dai-Gyakuten!? Ima Koso Ide yo Sūpā Shenron!" (Japanese: 悟空大逆転!? 今こそいでよ超神龍(スーパーシェンロン)!)	73B–75A	December 6, 2009	July 29, 2010
An attempt by Ginyu to switch into Vegeta's body is thwarted by Goku, who intercepts the beam, sending Ginyu and Goku back to their respective original bodies. Ginyu tries again to switch with Vegeta, but Goku throws a Namekian frog into the path, resulting in Ginyu switching into the frog's body. Goku convinces Vegeta to let Ginyu go. Vegeta places Goku in a rejuvenation chamber inside Frieza's spaceship, and gives battle armor to Krillin and Gohan. Krillin leaves to find the Grand Elder to learn the appropriate summoning ritual for the Namekian Dragon Balls, meeting up with Dende on the way over. It is revealed that the summoning has to be done in the Namekian language, so Dende will act as the translator to summon the dragon and request the wishes. Meanwhile, Nail continues to fight Frieza to stall for the time needed for Dende to reach Krillin and Gohan. Nail eventually reveals this to Frieza; an enraged Frieza immediately charges back towards his spaceship. Krillin, Gohan, and Dende take advantage of the fact that Vegeta is napping, and take the Dragon Balls away from the ship and successfully summon Porunga, the Eternal Dragon of Namek.
36	18	"An Enraged Freeza Draws Near! Polunga... Grant This Wish!" / "Frieza Closes In! Mighty Porunga, Grant Our Wish!"; Transliteration: "Gekikō Furīza ga Semaru! Porunga yo... Negai o Kanae Tamae!" (Japanese: 激昂フリーザが迫る! ポルンガよ…願いを叶えたまえ!)	75B–77A	December 13, 2009	September 6, 2010
Krillin and Gohan discover that although the Namekian Dragon Balls can grant three wishes, they can resurrect only one person per wish. After consulting with their dead friends via King Kai's telepathic abilities, they use the first wish to revive Piccolo, which also brings Kami and the Earth's Dragon Balls back. They then use the second wish to teleport Piccolo to Namek so he can assist them in their fight with Frieza, but they are not specific enough in their wish; Piccolo is transported far away from the imminent battle with Frieza. Vegeta awakens and learns he was deceived, and speeds angrily to where Porunga is hovering over Namek. He is about to attack Krillin and Gohan until they tell him there is still one wish left; they decide to let Vegeta use the wish to become immortal, as it seems to be the only possible way to defeat Frieza. Before the wish can be granted, the Grand Elder dies, and the Namekian Dragon Balls become useless; Porunga disintegrates, and the balls turn into plain stone. Frieza finally arrives, and is not happy that his own plans for immortality have been thwarted.
37	19	"A Nightmarish Super Transformation! Freeza's Battle Power Reaches 1-Million" / "A Nightmare Transformation! Frieza's Power Level: One-Million?!"; Transliteration: "Akumu no Chō Henshin! Sentōryoku Hyaku-man no Furīza" (Japanese: 悪夢の超変身! 戦闘力100万のフリーザ)	77B–78	December 20, 2009	October 20, 2010
Enraged, Frieza begins unleashing his power. On the way to Frieza, Piccolo encounters an ailing Nail, on the brink of death. Piccolo reluctantly performs a Namekian fusion with Nail, which increases his power substantially, and continues rushing to the battlefield. Meanwhile, Frieza attacks the Earthlings with energy blasts before charging towards Vegeta, after he mocks Frieza. Both Frieza and Vegeta struggle against each other while powering up, though it turns out that they are both evenly matched, much to Frieza's shock. Following this battle, Frieza transforms to his second form—following some goading from Vegeta—and this increases his power level to over a million. With his increased power, Frieza easily destroys most of the island they are standing on, before charging at Krillin in the air, impaling him on one of his horns.
38	20	"Freeza Bares His Fangs! Gohan's Transcendent Power Attacks" / "Frieza Bares His Fangs! Gohan's Overwhelming Attack!"; Transliteration: "Kiba o Muku Furīza! Chōzetsu Pawā ga Gohan o Osō" (Japanese: 牙をむくフリーザ! 超絶パワーが悟飯を襲う)	79–80	December 27, 2009	October 21, 2010
After impaling Krillin, Frieza slings him into the water. A furious Gohan immediately starts attacking Frieza and overpowers him, much to Vegeta's surprise. As Gohan knocks Frieza out of the air and attacks him with energy blasts, Dende saves Krillin from drowning and heals him—this was one of his hidden powers that the Grand Elder had unlocked. Frieza charges towards Gohan to get his revenge, only to be blasted in the back by Vegeta, which has no effect. Frieza begins thrashing Gohan, but he is rescued by the healed Krillin, who cuts off Frieza's tail with a Kienzan and buys enough time for Dende to heal Gohan. It becomes clear that Frieza outclasses them all, so the three warriors begin blasting him with everything they have. Once again, it has no effect, but as they are about to charge him in their moment of desperation, Piccolo finally arrives on the battlefield, announcing that he will be the one to win the battle.
39	21	"The Reborn Piccolo Arrives! A Furious Freeza's 2nd Transformation" / "Piccolo Reborn! Frieza's Second Transformation!"; Transliteration: "Shinsei Pikkoro Arawaru! Gekido Furīza Dai-Ni no Henshin" (Japanese: 新生ピッコロあらわる! 激怒フリーザ第2の変身)	81–82	January 10, 2010	October 27, 2010
Fortified by his combining with Nail, Piccolo begins battling Frieza, holding his own. The two exchange blows pretty evenly for a good portion of the fight. Piccolo eventually realizes Frieza slightly holds the upper hand, so Piccolo removes his weighted training clothing and begins winning. Frieza finds himself backed into a corner, so he decides it is best to transform again to fight Piccolo. Becoming his grotesque, ugly third form, Frieza once again gains the upper hand and begins obliterating Piccolo with a rapid finger beam blast. Gohan rushes to rescue Piccolo, and when Krillin tries to follow suit, Vegeta stops him—revealing to Krillin that he may have a strategy that will allow him to win.
40	22	"Freeza's Final Super Transformation! The Terror Greater than Hell Begins" / "Frieza's Final Transformation! The Ultimate Nightmare Begins!"; Transliteration: "Furīza Saigo no Chō-Henshin! Jigoku-ijō no Kyōfu ga Hajimaru" (Japanese: フリーザ最後の超変身! 地獄以上の恐怖がはじまる)	83–84A	January 17, 2010	October 28, 2010
Frieza dodges Gohan's attack, but Gohan unleashes a massive ki blast that even Frieza struggles to deflect. Frieza then decides to transform to his fourth form—the final and most powerful, and also his true form. Vegeta's plan to defeat Frieza involves having himself mortally wounded and then being healed by Dende—which Vegeta achieves by having Krillin shoot a ki blast through his chest, which causes Saiyans to substantially grow in power. Vegeta lowers his defenses to allow Krillin's attack to succeed, and Krillin seriously injures Vegeta. Initially hesitant to kill Vegeta, Dende heals Piccolo and is eventually convinced to heal Vegeta as well. Frieza eventually reaches his final form, and immediately kills Dende with his Death Beam technique—having witnessed his healing abilities while transforming; Frieza has realized that this may be the key to defeating the others. Krillin, Gohan, and Piccolo go on the attack, but Frieza easily dodges every single attack they throw his way. Vegeta watches them fight from a hill, preparing to charge up to his newfound power level as Gohan finds himself on a direct collision course with another one of Frieza's blasts.
41	23	"The Moment We've Waited For! Son Goku is Revived" / "The Moment of Truth Approaches! Goku Back in Action!"; Transliteration: "Machinimatta ze Kono Shunkan! Son Gokū ga Fukkatsu da" (Japanese: 待ちに待ったぜこの瞬間! 孫悟空が復活だ)	84B–85	January 24, 2010	November 3, 2010
Vegeta intervenes, using his newfound power and speed to rescue Gohan from Frieza's blast. While Gohan is grateful, Vegeta tells him he only did it as a demonstration of his abilities now that he has declared himself a Super Saiyan. He powers up, which leaves Gohan, Krillin, and Piccolo in awe, but Frieza dodges and deflects all of Vegeta's attacks, using only 1% of his full power. When Vegeta unleashes another powerful blast at Frieza in desperation, which could destroy Namek as well, Frieza powers up a little bit further and easily deflects the blast with his foot, which then destroys another planet. Vegeta quickly finds himself on the receiving end of Frieza's attacks and is quickly beaten after he realizes he has not actually achieved Super Saiyan status. Frieza pounds Vegeta while berating him for his "ungratefulness" towards Frieza for his "special treatment", back when he was in service of Frieza. Gohan attempts to help, but Piccolo tells him he would be unable to do anything anyway. However, just as all hope seems lost, Goku emerges from the rejuvenation chamber inside Frieza's spaceship fully recovered and with his power once again increased beyond his expectations.
42	24	"Defeat Freeza, Son Goku! The Proud Vegeta's Tears" / "Defeat Frieza, Goku! The Tears of the Proud Saiyan Prince!"; Transliteration: "Furīza o Taose Son Gokū! Hokori Takaki Bejīta no Namida" (Japanese: フリーザを倒せ孫悟空! 誇り高きベジータの涙)	86–87A	January 31, 2010	November 4, 2010
Vegeta is no match for Frieza and is quickly incapacitated. Piccolo, Gohan, and Krillin are forced to stand idly by while this happens. However, Goku finally arrives at the battlefield and intervenes, delivering a powerful kick to Frieza's face when he tries to attack Goku. Frieza then tries to kill Goku with a barrage of Death Beams, though Goku easily deflects them all. Frieza realizes Goku is reminiscent of Bardock, Goku's father. When Vegeta tells Frieza that Goku is the "real" Super Saiyan, Frieza fires his Death Beam through Vegeta's heart, giving him just seconds to live. Before dying, Vegeta informs Goku that Frieza was responsible for destroying Planet Vegeta and the entire Saiyan race; Vegeta begs Goku to defeat him and avenge Planet Vegeta, and even sheds true tears, which greatly moves Goku. Goku then buries Vegeta, before setting his sights on Frieza himself, vowing that he will defeat him.
43	25	"Son Goku vs. Freeza! The Curtain Opens on the Super Decisive Battle!" / "Goku vs. Frieza! The Super Showdown Begins!"; Transliteration: "Son Gokū tai Furīza! Chō-Kessen no Makuake da!" (Japanese: 孫悟空VSフリーザ! 超決戦の幕開けだ!)	87B–88	February 7, 2010	November 10, 2010
Goku jumps into battle against Frieza, and quickly proves to be more of a challenge than Frieza thought. The two exchange powerful blows and discover that their levels of strength are nearly equal. As Goku and Frieza attempt to one-up each other, Gohan, Krillin, and Piccolo back away to watch the battle from a safe distance, while Yamcha, Tien, and Chiaotzu watch from King Kai's planet in the Other World. At one point during the battle, Goku is able to take advantage of Frieza's inability to sense another's ki, but Frieza counters this by trapping Goku in an exploding ball of energy that nearly kills him, with Goku managing to break free at the last possible moment. However, Piccolo states that even after all this, neither Goku nor Frieza are fighting at full power just yet.
44	26	"A Physical War That Exceeds All Limits! Goku and Freeza and Ginyu Again!?" / "A Boundary-Pushing Brawl! Goku, Frieza, and Ginyu Again?!"; Transliteration: "Genkai Toppa no Nikudansen! Gokū to Furīza to Ginyū Futatabi!?" (Japanese: 限界突破の肉弾戦! 悟空とフリーザとギニュー再び!?)	89–90	February 14, 2010	November 11, 2010
Goku and Frieza's battle continues, with Frieza offering to refrain from using his arms in the fight. Frieza decides to use a little more of his power, and he fights Goku on the ground using only his feet. However, when Goku manages to land solid blows, Frieza becomes enraged and strikes back with his arm. Goku discovers Frieza has only been using a small amount of his total power. Frieza then boosts his power up to 50%, and Goku is quickly overwhelmed, even with the use of the 10-times Kaio-ken. Meanwhile, Bulma meets the frog Ginyu, and Ginyu steals her body, leaving Bulma in the frog form. Ginyu heads for the battlefield; Bulma has managed to accompany him, and both soon arrive at the battlefield where Goku and Frieza are continuing to duke it out—with Goku quickly being outclassed by the powered-up Frieza.
45	27	"It's a 20-Fold Kaiō-ken! A Kamehameha With Everything on the Line" / "Kaio-ken Times Twenty! An All-Or-Nothing Kamehame-Ha!"; Transliteration: "Nijū-Bai Kaiō-ken da! Subete o Kaketa Kamehameha" (Japanese: 20倍界王拳だ! すべてを賭けたかめはめ波)	91–92A	February 21, 2010	November 17, 2010
Ginyu tries to steal Piccolo's body, but is foiled by Gohan, who throws the frog body containing Bulma's spirit back in the way, putting Bulma back in her own body and once again trapping Ginyu in the frog body. Meanwhile, Goku continues to be thrashed by Frieza. However, when Frieza attempts to drown him, he sees a vision of Frieza destroying everyone he loves. As a result, he breaks out and uses the 20-times Kaio-ken alongside a massive Kamehameha against Frieza, who retaliates with his own blast. However, Frieza barely suffers any injuries from their energy clash, and the use of the 20-times Kaio-ken severely weakens Goku. After taking another beating from Frieza, Goku then has another vision, this time of Vegeta and other Saiyans of the past, reminding him that should he fail, Frieza will finally succeed in exterminating the entire Saiyan race. Motivated once again, Goku stands his ground as an enraged Frieza lunges at him.
46	28	"This is the Last Trump Card! Goku's Extra-Large Genki-Dama" / "The Final Trump Card! Goku's Ultimate Spirit Bomb!"; Transliteration: "Kore ga Saigo no Kirifuda da! Gokū no Tokudai Genki-Dama" (Japanese: これが最後の切り札だ! 悟空の特大元気玉)	92B–94A	February 28, 2010	November 18, 2010
Goku realizes he has no chance of victory using direct physical attacks against Frieza, who is still using only 50% of his full power. He decides to use his ultimate technique: the Spirit Bomb. With so little ki from living things left to absorb on Namek, Goku absorbs ki from neighboring worlds as well. Creating a Spirit Bomb of this size takes extensive time and concentration, and after a while, an impatient Frieza resumes pummeling him. Piccolo decides to intervene, taking what energy Gohan and Krillin have left, deciding to attack Frieza to draw attention away from Goku and the Spirit Bomb he is creating. While gloating, Frieza notices the light from the Spirit Bomb reflected on the surface of a lake, shocking him. Before Frieza can finish off Goku with a beam to the forehead, Piccolo stops him with a full-force kick to the head. The now-distracted Frieza pursues Piccolo, whose attacks do nothing to faze him. Piccolo is quickly floored by Frieza, who decides to eliminate Piccolo, while Goku continues charging the Spirit Bomb.
47	29	"Awaken Warrior of Legend... Super Saiyan, Son Goku!" / "Awaken, Legendary Warrior! Goku the Super Saiyan!"; Transliteration: "Mezamero Densetsu no Senshi... Sūpā Saiyajin, Son Gokū!" (Japanese: 目覚めろ伝説の戦士…超(スーパー)サイヤ人、孫悟空!!)	94B–95	March 7, 2010	November 27, 2010
Gohan and Krillin attack Frieza, saving Piccolo from death. Goku completes the Spirit Bomb and hurls it down upon Frieza, which also absorbs Frieza's charging Death Ball. The Z Fighters celebrate their apparent victory and start making plans to return to Earth. However, Frieza reappears and, though badly injured by the Spirit Bomb, he is still powerful enough to take them all out. Frieza fires his Death Beam straight at Goku, but Piccolo intervenes and takes the beam to the chest, which knocks him unconscious. Frieza next sets his sights on Krillin and causes Krillin's body to explode from the inside, killing him. Enraged by these sacrifices, Goku undergoes a radical transformation in which his eyes turn from black to green, his black hair turns blonde, and his body is surrounded by an aura of golden light, becoming a Super Saiyan. With his powers now greatly enhanced, Goku orders Gohan to take Piccolo to his spaceship, find Bulma, and leave Namek, while he stays behind to handle Frieza.
48	30	"The Angry Super Saiyan! Throw Your Hat in the Ring, Son Goku!" / "The Angry Super Saiyan! Goku Throws Down the Gauntlet!"; Transliteration: "Okoreru Sūpā Saiyajin! Nanori o Agero Son Gokū!" (Japanese: 怒れる超(スーパー)サイヤ人! 名乗りを上げろ孫悟空!)	96–97A	March 14, 2010	November 27, 2010
The transformed Goku renews his battle with Frieza and proves now to be far superior to Frieza's power. Frieza launches several counterattacks at Goku, but they have no effect at all. Frieza comes to the realization that a Super Saiyan, which he had long secretly feared, has finally been born. Desperate to defeat Goku, Frieza hurls an attack down upon Namek itself, in an effort to destroy the planet and everyone on it.
49	31	"Exact Vengeance, Son Goku! Countdown to the Planet's Collapse" / "Avenge the Fallen, Goku! Countdown to the Planet's Destruction!"; Transliteration: "Kataki o Ute Son Gokū! Wakusei Hōkai no Kauntodaun" (Japanese: 仇を討て孫悟空! 惑星崩壊のカウントダウン)	97B–98A	March 21, 2010	December 16, 2010
Frieza's attack on Namek detonates the planet's core, and he says that Namek will explode in five minutes. Goku is confident that he can defeat Frieza within that time; however, Frieza then decides to power up to 100% of his full power. At 70% power, Frieza blasts Goku deep into the planet's surface, giving him pause. When Frieza finally begins powering up to 100%, King Kai urges Goku to strike at Frieza and take him down before he can reach full power, which Goku refuses to do, instead wishing to defeat Frieza at his best and also avenge Krillin.
50	32	"Freeza's Do-or-Die Full Power! Shenlong, Heed This Wish" / "Full-Power Frieza! Shenron, Grant Our Wish!"; Transliteration: "Furīza Kesshi no Furu Pawā! Negai o Todokete Kure Shenron" (Japanese: フリーザ決死のフルパワー! 願いを届けてくれ神龍(シェンロン))	98B–99	March 28, 2010	December 16, 2010
With his full power, Frieza gains the upper hand, surpassing Goku in speed. When Frieza claims that he was just warming up, Goku reveals that he hasn't even begun to use his full power yet. As the epic battle between Goku and Frieza continues on the dying Namek, King Kai is informed by Kami on Earth that Mr. Popo has gathered all seven of Earth's Dragon Balls. Upon learning of the Earth's Dragon Balls' ability to resurrect multiple people despite being limited to one wish per use, King Kai asks that they be used to bring back to life all those on Namek who were killed by Frieza and his minions, thus also bringing back the Grand Elder, as well as the Namekian Dragon Balls, which still have one more wish to be used. King Kai plans to use this final wish to teleport everyone on Namek to Earth except for Frieza, leaving the tyrant to be the only one present when Namek explodes. Mr. Popo then summons Shenron to fulfill King Kai's first wish. Failing to defeat Goku, an enraged Frieza gathers all of his energy and charges at Goku, with Goku firing a Kamehameha at Frieza in response.
51	33	"Goku's Furious Battle Cry! Make It in Time... The Resurrection Wish!" / "Goku's Furious Roar! A Last-Minute Resurrection Wish!"; Transliteration: "Gokū Gekido no Osakebi! Ma ni Ae... Kishi-Kaisei no Negai!" (Japanese: 悟空激怒の雄叫び! 間に合え…起死回生の願い!)	100–101	April 4, 2010	February 5, 2011
Goku and Frieza engage in a beam struggle, but when Frieza continues to push forward, Goku decides to power up even further. Meanwhile, King Kai informs Kami of his plan to resurrect the Namekians and then to remove everyone from Namek except for Frieza. On Namek, Frieza drives Goku deep into the planet, which generates a volcanic eruption in the process. Believing that he had finally defeated Goku, Frieza gloats over Goku's apparent fall. After sensing the disappearance of Goku's energy signature, Gohan decides to fight Frieza to stall him until the planet's destruction. Meanwhile, Shenron succeeds in resurrecting everyone killed by Frieza and his henchmen on Namek (minus Krillin), and the Grand Elder and the Namekian Dragon Balls are also brought back. Goku emerges from the ocean and resumes his fight with Frieza, while Gohan flees back to Goku's spaceship. King Kai immediately contacts the Grand Elder, who in turn has Dende ask Porunga for the wish. However, Goku requests to King Kai that he remain on Namek as well, so he can finish Frieza once and for all. Porunga fulfills this wish. The two combatants then prepare themselves for the final round before Namek's explosion.
52	34	"Two Remain on a Vanishing Planet! This is the Final Showdown" / "Duel on a Vanishing Planet! The Final Showdown!"; Transliteration: "Kieyuku Hoshi ni Nokotta Futari! Kore ga Saishū Kessen da" (Japanese: 消えゆく星に残った2人! これが最終決戦だ)	102–104A	April 11, 2010	February 9, 2011
As the battle continues, it seems neither warrior is going to win before Namek's explosion. Although Frieza is able to land some blows, it turns out that Goku is still stronger, and eventually gains the upper hand in the fight. Goku soon notices that Frieza's power is quickly decreasing, due to his 100% full power taking its toll on his body, and also due to the injuries that Frieza had suffered earlier. Satisfied that he has won, Goku decides to call it quits and begins to depart. Unable to accept this, Frieza launches a pair of heat-seeking ki disks at Goku. Goku manages to avoid the disks, though Frieza tethers the disks' to Goku's heat signature, using them to chase him down. Eventually, however, Frieza is sliced in half by his own attack.
53	35	"The Final Blow, Son Goku... Planet Namek Scatters Throughout Space" / "Goku's Final Attack! Countdown to Planet Namek's Destruction!"; Transliteration: "Son Gokū, Saigo no Ichigeki... Namekku-sei Uchū ni Chiru" (Japanese: 孫悟空、最後の一撃…ナメック星宇宙に散る)	104B–106A	April 18, 2010	February 10, 2011
On Earth, the Grand Elder dies a second time, but before his death, he gives his power to Moori, one of his eldest sons. This makes him the new Grand Elder, thereby preserving the power of the Namekian Dragon Balls. Meanwhile, on Namek, the dying Frieza begs for mercy from Goku. Goku gives Frieza some of his own ki before departing. However, Frieza unleashes one final ki blast at Goku, attempting to kill him, but Goku easily repels the blast back and seemingly destroys Frieza in the process. Goku then attempts to escape in Frieza's spaceship, but is unable to make it take off, due to the damage from Vegeta's earlier attack when he was stealing the Namekian Dragon Balls from Frieza. Namek finally explodes and it appears that Goku perished along with the planet.
54	36	"Goku Vanishes in Space... Return to Life! Super Warriors" / "Goku Vanishes Into Space! Welcome Home, Super Warriors!"; Transliteration: "Uchū ni Kieta Gokū... Yomigaere! Sūpā Senshi-tachi" (Japanese: 宇宙に消えた悟空…甦れ!超(スーパー)戦士たち)	106B–107	April 25, 2010	February 16, 2011
Following Namek's destruction, King Kai informs Bulma and the others on Earth of Goku's apparent death, and that even though the Namekian Dragon Balls can resurrect Goku and Krillin, they will be brought back to where Namek used to be and die again in the vacuum of space. However, Vegeta comes up with the idea of using the Dragon Balls to first bring Goku and Krillin's souls to Earth. 130 days after their use on Namek, the Namekian Dragon Balls become re-active, and the first two wishes are used to successfully revive Krillin; it is revealed that Goku is actually still alive and that he will return to Earth on his own later. Yamcha is then brought back to life with the third wish. Another 130 days later, the Namekian Dragon Balls are used to revive both Tien and Chiaotzu, and are then used to teleport all of the native Namekians to a new planet. The Z Fighters then return to their peaceful lives, waiting patiently for Goku to return.

=== Androids and Cell Saga (2010) ===
No. overall	No. in saga	English translated title / English dub title	Corresponding DBZ ep.	Original release date	American air date
55	1	"That's Earth, Papa... Freeza and His Father Strike Back" / "There Is Planet Earth, Father! Frieza and King Cold Strike Back!"; Transliteration: "Are ga Chikyū da yo Papa... Furīza-Oyako no Gyakushū" (Japanese: あれが地球だよパパ... フリーザ親子の逆襲)	118–119	May 2, 2010	February 17, 2011
A year has passed and Goku has still not returned to Earth. However, it is revealed that Frieza managed to survive his battle with the Super Saiyan, has been rebuilt into a cyborg by his father King Cold, and is heading towards Earth, intending to exact revenge on Goku. The rest of the Z Fighters gather to defend the Earth from Frieza, despite knowing the odds are against them, especially since King Cold is even more powerful than Frieza. However, as soon as Frieza, King Cold, and their army of soldiers arrive on Earth, they are met by a mysterious teenager wielding a sword, who says that he has come to kill them.
56	2	"I'll Defeat Freeza! Another Super Saiyan" / "I Will Defeat Frieza! Another Super Saiyan!"; Transliteration: "Furīza wa Boku ga Taosu! Mō Hitori no Sūpā Saiyajin" (Japanese: フリーザはボクが倒す! もう一人の超サイヤ人)	120–121A	May 9, 2010	February 23, 2011
The mysterious teenager easily takes out Frieza's soldiers, then surprises Frieza by transforming into a Super Saiyan, also traumatizing him in the process. Frieza unsuccessfully attempts to destroy this second Super Saiyan. The teenager urges Frieza to use his full power, but Frieza is hesitant to do so (since he planned to save his full power for fighting Goku), though he eventually decides to unleash a Supernova, his most powerful attack on him. The teenager is able to hold back Frieza's attack, and he manages to avoid Frieza's detonation of the energy ball as well. Soon afterward, he slices Frieza into pieces with his sword, before blasting him away. King Cold tries to defeat the Super Saiyan himself, but the teenager easily kills him and destroys his ship. After reverting to his normal state, the teenager spots the Z Fighters and says that Goku will be arriving nearby soon. Despite their skepticism, the Z Fighters agree to join him in awaiting Goku's arrival.
57	3	"Welcome Back Son Goku! The Confession of the Mysterious Young Boy Trunks" / "Welcome Back, Goku! Confessions of the Mysterious Youth, Trunks!"; Transliteration: "Okaeri Son Gokū! Nazo no Shōnen Torankusu no Kokuhaku" (Japanese: おかえり孫悟空! 謎の少年トランクスの告白)	121B–122	May 16, 2010	February 24, 2011
After three hours of waiting, a space pod crash lands on Earth and Goku emerges from it. There is no time for celebration, however, as the mysterious teenager pulls Goku aside to talk with him in private. After testing Goku's Super Saiyan powers, the teenager reveals that his name is Trunks and that he comes from an apocalyptic future 20 years from the present, as well as that he is the future son of Bulma and Vegeta. He further informs Goku that in three years from now, a pair of deadly androids, built by Doctor Gero of the former Red Ribbon Army, will begin a rampage on Earth and kill all of the Z Fighters, except for Goku, who will have died from a heart virus six months before their assault. Trunks then supplies Goku with a heart antidote made in his future timeline, instructing him to take it when the virus attacks him. Piccolo hears the whole conversation using his special hearing. Goku promises that he and the other Z Fighters will train hard for the next three years to prepare for the androids' assault, and Trunks then returns to the future in his time machine.
58	4	"New Technique of Goku, Instant Movement! Special Training Staked on 3 Years From Now" / "Goku's New Move, Instant Transmission! The Three-Year Training Session Begins!"; Transliteration: "Gokū no Shin Waza, Shunkan Idō! San-nen Go ni Kaketa Tokkun" (Japanese: 悟空の新ワザ、瞬間移動! 3年後に賭けた特訓)	123–125	May 23, 2010	March 2, 2011
At Vegeta's request, Goku explains to the others that he survived Namek's destruction by escaping in one of the Ginyu Force's space pods just seconds before Namek exploded. He further explains that he eventually landed on a planet called Yardrat and was nursed back to health by the friendly inhabitants of the planet. He also reveals that he learned from them a special teleportation technique called Instant Transmission. The Z Fighters then go their separate ways to each begin preparing themselves for the androids' assault. After three years of intense training, they all head off to meet on the island on which Trunks had indicated that the androids would begin their attack.
59	5	"The Pair Who Don't Leave a Trace! The Artificial Humans Appear" / "Undetectable Monsters! The Androids Appear!"; Transliteration: "Kehai o Motanu Futari-gumi! Jinzōningen, Arawaru" (Japanese: 気配を持たぬ2人組! 人造人間、あらわる)	126–127A	May 30, 2010	March 8, 2011
The Z Fighters gather at the island in anticipation of the androids' attack. However, as the time approaches, the androids are nowhere to be seen. Yajirobe arrives to deliver Korin's new batch of Senzu beans to the others, but as soon as he departs, the androids shoot down his ship and immediately descend into the nearby city before the Z Fighters can get a glimpse of them. Gohan goes to rescue Yajirobe, while the rest of the Z Fighters fly down to the city as well to search out their enemies. After a period of searching, Yamcha becomes the first victim of the androids, after having his energy absorbed by Android #20, and then being impaled. The others arrive just in time to save him, and Goku eventually persuades the androids to move to a new location to fight after a large portion of the city is destroyed.
60	6	"Attacked on Both Sides by an Internal Enemy?! Son Goku vs Artificial Human #19" / "The Unbeatable Enemy Within! Goku vs. Android 19!"; Transliteration: "Uchi-naru Teki to no Hasami-Uchi!? Son Gokū tai Jinzōningen Jūkyū-gō" (Japanese: 内なる敵との挟み撃ち!? 孫悟空VS人造人間19号)	127B–129A	June 6, 2010	March 9, 2011
As Goku, Piccolo, and Tien take the androids to a new location to battle, Krillin revives Yamcha with a Senzu bean. However, once Yamcha reveals the androids' ability to absorb energy, he, Krillin, and Gohan head off to warn the others. Meanwhile, it is revealed to Goku that the androids are a result of years of research conducted by Dr. Gero, in which miniature spy robots were used to analyze Goku's fighting techniques and developments in strength, all in an attempt to exact revenge on Goku for destroying the Red Ribbon Army. However, Gero did not analyze Goku during his time on Namek, and thus the androids are unaware of his ability to transform into a Super Saiyan, which Goku gladly demonstrates in front of them. A battle then ensues between Goku and Android #19, and though Goku clearly has the upper hand, he soon appears to be losing energy. Eventually, Goku is seen clutching the left side of his chest, which Gohan immediately recognizes as a symptom of the heart virus that Trunks had warned Goku of. However, the virus is attacking Goku's heart much later than Trunks had predicted. As Goku struggles to stay conscious, #19 prepares to finish the battle by absorbing Goku's remaining energy. Piccolo tries to intervene, however, Android #20 blasts Piccolo with his eye beams, which sends him crashing to the ground.
61	7	"No Chance of Victory Against #19! Super Vegeta Arrives Late" / "No Victory for Android 19! Enter Super Vegeta!"; Transliteration: "Jūkyū-gō ni Shōki Nashi! Okurete Kita Sūpā Bejīta" (Japanese: 19号に勝機なし! 遅れてきた超ベジータ)	129B–130A	June 13, 2010	March 10, 2011
Before Android #19 can finish draining Goku's energy, Vegeta finally arrives, saving Goku by kicking the android in the face. Yamcha then escorts Goku back home in order to administer the heart antidote to him. Vegeta then faces off with the androids, and much to everyone's surprise, transforms into a Super Saiyan. It is revealed that, whereas Goku's first transformation was triggered by his rage over Frieza's murder of Krillin, Vegeta's was triggered by his rage at simply being unable to surpass Goku. The battle then begins, and it's clear that Vegeta has the edge over #19. Even the android's energy absorption attack proves futile, as Vegeta tears off the android's hands, making it impossible for it to absorb anymore energy from its opponents. As the android runs away in fear, Vegeta launches his Big Bang Attack and finishes the battle, leaving nothing but the android's head intact. Android #20 then escapes into the nearby cliffs, planning to use the terrain to launch a surprise attack on the Z Fighters.
62	8	"Piccolo's Assault! The Missing #20 and the Future Gone Askew" / "Piccolo's Assault! Android 20 and the Twisted Future!"; Transliteration: "Pikkoro Kyōshū! Kieta Nijū-ō to Nejireru Mirai" (Japanese: ピッコロ強襲! 消えた20号とねじれる未来)	130B–132A	June 20, 2010	March 16, 2011
The Z Fighters split up to search the area for Android #20. Frustrated at his enemy's deceptiveness, Vegeta fires a large ki blast at the cliffs, planning to level the area. Seeing this opportunity, #20 emerges from his hiding place, only to absorb Vegeta's blast and run away before Vegeta can catch up. The android then attacks Piccolo from behind and begins to drain his energy, although this is thwarted by Gohan, who senses Piccolo's fading ki and attacks Android #20. After receiving a Senzu bean, Piccolo then faces off against his attacker, and proves to be more than a match for the android. Meanwhile, Trunks finally returns from the future, and is disturbed to find that the remains of Android #19 are different from the androids that he faced in his own timeline. He then arrives at the current battlefield, and also seems not to recognize #20. Realising that he has no chance of victory, #20 decides to retreat to his laboratory, but not before launching a huge blast that engulfs most of the area - including Bulma's ship, which plummets towards the ground.
63	9	"Pursue! Doctor Gero... The Search for the Mysterious Laboratory!" / "The Hunt for Doctor Gero! Discover the Hidden Laboratory!"; Transliteration: "Tsuigeki! Dokutā Gero... Nazo no Kenkyūjo o Sagase!" (Japanese: 追撃! ドクター・ゲロ... 謎の研究所を探せ！)	132B–133A	June 27, 2010	March 17, 2011
As the dust settles, Android #20 is nowhere to be seen, and it is assumed that he plans to return to the laboratory to awaken Androids #17 and #18 - the androids causing havoc in Trunk's timeline. Meanwhile, Trunks rescues his mother and young self, and berates Vegeta for failing to protect his family. Bulma then reveals that #20 may actually be the androids' creator, Dr. Gero, who has seemingly converted himself into one as well. The group then plan to find the lab and destroy the androids before Gero can activate them. Vegeta also sets off to find the lab, but with the intentions of fighting the androids as a demonstration of his power. Trunks leaves to stop his father, while Piccolo finally unveils the truth of Trunks' origin to the rest of the group. He knew this because he overheard the conversation between Trunks and Goku. Meanwhile, Piccolo, Krillin and Tien split up and search the mountains where Gero's lab is rumoured to be located, while Gohan takes Bulma, baby Trunks, and Yajirobe home. Meanwhile, Krillin is attacked by the doctor, but is spared when Gero senses Piccolo nearby and escapes.
64	10	"#17 and #18, and...! The Artificial Humans Awaken" / "Number 17 and Number 18! The Androids Awaken!"; Transliteration: "Jūnana Gō to Jūhachi Gō, Soshite...! Mezameru Jinzōningen-tachi" (Japanese: 17号と18号、そして...! 目覚める人造人間たち)	133B–134	July 11, 2010	May 30, 2011
Dr. Gero finally makes it to his laboratory, with Krillin in hot pursuit. Tien, Piccolo, Vegeta, and Trunks soon locate him and break into the lab, although by this point Gero has already awakened Androids #17 and #18. Although initially appearing loyal, the duo demonstrate their independence when #17 destroys Gero's remote, ensuring that he cannot deactivate them should they disobey him, and #18 attempts to activate Android #16 - a fully mechanical model deemed a failure by Gero. #17 then kills Gero, by severing and then crushing his head. In an act of desperation, Trunks launches a large ki blast at the androids, hoping to destroy #16 before he is activated. Although the entire lab is decimated, both androids and #16's pod remain intact, and he is awakened anyway. The trio then decide to carry out their initial orders, and set out to kill Goku. However, their plans are disrupted when Vegeta intervenes, challenging the three androids to a battle. After #16 and #17 refuses to fight, #18 steps up to face Vegeta.
65	11	"A Cute Face and Super Power?! #18 vs Vegeta" / "A Sweet Face and Super Power? Android 18 vs. Vegeta!"; Transliteration: "Kawaī Kao de Chō Pawā!? Jūhachi Gō tai Bejīta" (Japanese: かわいい顔で超パワー!? 18号VSべジータ)	135–136	July 18, 2010	June 2, 2011
Android #18 fights with Super Saiyan Vegeta and wins easily. Super Saiyan Trunks tries to help his father, but is also easily defeated and gets his sword broken in the process. Piccolo and Tien then get beaten down effortlessly by Android #17, while Krillin stays behind and watches the horror, and Android #16 simply observes the nearby birds. After the fight, the androids leave, but before they do #18 kisses Krillin on the cheek.
66	12	"The Time has Come to Become One Again... Piccolo's Decision for Ultimate Power!" / "The Time for Reunification Has Come! Piccolo's Unshakeable Resolve!"; Transliteration: "Hitotsu ni Modoru Toki ga Kita... Pikkoro Saikyō he no Ketsui!" (Japanese: 1つに戻る時がきた... ピッコロ最強への決意!)	137–138	August 1, 2010	June 9, 2011
Krillin feeds the remaining Senzu beans to each of his fallen comrades. Vegeta flies off in anger, having been beaten, while Trunks explains to the others how the androids of the future are different from the ones they just fought. The androids of the present are apparently more powerful, but they seem to be less cruel. There also was not an Android #16 in Trunks' time period. Piccolo then flies off to try to convince Kami to merge with him once again, believing that it is the only way to stop the androids. However, Kami believes that the androids are not entirely evil and that the only reason they fought against the Z Fighters was because the Z Fighters attacked first. Kami then decides to wait and see what happens as Piccolo sits down waiting until Kami agrees to merge with him.
67	13	"One More Time Machine?! Bulma Unveils a Mystery" / "Another Time Machine?! Bulma Uncovers a Mystery!"; Transliteration: "Mō Hitotsu no Taimu Mashin!? Buruma ga Shiraseta Misuterī" (Japanese: もう1つのタイムマシン!? ブルマが知らせたミステリー)	139–140A	August 8, 2010	June 16, 2011
Bulma receives a phone call about one of her company's products from Capsule Corporation. She is sent a photograph of what appears to be Trunks' time machine that he travelled in. Trunks investigates this with the others only to discover that it is the exact time machine that he came in but three years later in his world. He recognizes it because of the word 'Hope' that Bulma wrote on the time machine. Kami realizes that the evil he felt four years ago wasn't the androids but it was the monster that travelled back in the time machine.
68	14	"And So the Monster Makes its Move... Take Off! It's the Super Namekian!" / "The Monster Goes into Motion... Strike of the Super Namekian!"; Transliteration: "Soshite Kaibutsu ga Ugokidasu... Shutsugeki! Sūpā Namekku-seijin da!" (Japanese: そして怪物が動き出す... 出撃! 超ナメック星人だ!)	140B–141	August 15, 2010	June 23, 2011
Trunks, Gohan, and Bulma are investigating the other time machine when Gohan notices a strange shell that has been cast off by an unknown creature. On the way back to her house, Bulma watches a news broadcast about thousands of people in nearby Gingertown who have inexplicably disappeared, as if they simply melted away in their clothes. Kami also watches in horror as the people are killed, and finally decides to merge with Piccolo. After the merging, Piccolo states that he is neither Piccolo nor Kami anymore, but a Namekian "who has long since forgotten his name." He departs from the lookout and arrives at an empty, ghostly-quiet Gingertown, where the monster steps out of the shadows to confront him.
69	15	"I am Your Sibling! The Monster with the Ki of Goku" / "I Am Your Brother! The Monster With Goku's Energy!"; Transliteration: "Ore wa Omae no Kyōdai da! Goku no Ki wo Motsu Monsutā" (Japanese: オレはお前の兄弟だ! 悟空の気を持つモンスター)	142–143A	August 22, 2010	June 30, 2011
While staring down Piccolo, the monster pierces the man he'd been dragging and appears to absorb him, leaving only his clothing. The others are confused, saying that the android is emanating multiple ki readings characteristic of Frieza, King Cold, Vegeta, and Goku. Krillin and Trunks head toward Gingertown, where Piccolo and the monster begin fighting. Piccolo has the advantage, but is surprised when the monster uses Piccolo's own Makankosappo technique on him. The two exchange blows, and then the monster states that Piccolo only has the upper hand because he [the monster] has not yet reached his "perfect form." He then surprises everyone by powering up a Kamehameha and launching it point-blank. Piccolo's dodge leaves him open to the monster's follow-up attack, which he uses to trap Piccolo in a hold and pierce his arm. Piccolo manages to escape, but his left arm has been completely incapacitated. Sensing he has won, the monster states that his name is Cell and reveals that he is an android.
70	16	"Escape Tactic, Taiyoken! Chase after the Artificial Human Cell" / "The Dizzying Deception and the Daring Escape! Defeat the Android Cell!"; Transliteration: "Uzumaku Senryaku, Taiyōken! Jinzōningen Seru o Oe" (Japanese: 渦巻く策略、太陽拳! 人造人間セルを追え)	143B–144	August 29, 2010	July 6, 2011
Sensing that he has defeated Piccolo, Cell explains that he was created from the cells of the greatest warriors--including Goku's, Piccolo's, Vegeta's, King Cold's, and Frieza's--as a project started by Dr. Gero and continued for 24 years by his computer. Cell furthermore reveals that by absorbing Androids #17 and #18, he will achieve his "Perfect Form," making him "invincible," since Dr. Gero's computer predicted that in his Perfect Form, Cell would be the most powerful being in the known universe. With the androids destroyed in his own timeline, he was forced to travel to the present one in Trunks' time machine, after killing him. Having learned Cell's identity and intentions, Piccolo regenerates his arm and prepares to fight. At this point, Trunks and Krillin arrive, and Cell realizes he has no chance of winning. He surprises everyone by using Tien's Solar Flare technique to blind them, and then flees. Vegeta and Tien arrive, and Piccolo explains everything he's learned. Meanwhile, Cell heads toward Nickytown to absorb more people, until his power exceeds that of the androids'.
71	17	"Attack the Elusive Cell! Son Goku, Finally Revived!" / "The Hunt for Cell Is On! Goku, Back in Action!"; Transliteration: "Shinshutsu-Kibotsu no Seru o Ute! Tsui-ni Fukkatsu, Son Gokū!" (Japanese: 神出鬼没のセルを討て! ついに復活、孫悟空!)	145–146	September 5, 2010	July 7, 2011
After Piccolo debriefs everyone on Cell's objective, Vegeta states that he intends to develop a power that surpasses even that of a Super Saiyan. Trunks and Krillin go to Dr. Gero's laboratory, where they discover a set of blueprints for Android #17. In hopes that the prints will allow Bulma and Dr. Briefs to uncover a weakness in the androids, they take the prints before destroying the developing Cell and the rest of the laboratory. Trunks goes to find Vegeta while Krillin delivers the prints to Bulma. Several days go by, during which Piccolo and the others are unable to locate Cell. However, back at the Kame House, Chi-Chi and Master Roshi start hearing thunderous booms on the island and rush to the window to find a fully recovered Goku launching Kamehameha blasts into the horizon. The three share a joyous moment before Goku turns serious and states that he'd fare no better against the androids than Vegeta did. Also like Vegeta, he states his goal of surpassing the level of Super Saiyan.
72	18	"Surpass Super Saiyan! Now, Into the Room of Spirit and Time" / "Break the Super Saiyan Barrier! Into the Hyperbolic Time Chamber!"; Transliteration: "Sūpā Saiyajin o Koero! Iza, Seishin to Toki no Heya e" (Japanese: 超サイヤ人を超えろ! いざ、精神と時の部屋へ)	147–148A	September 12, 2010	July 13, 2011
Goku uses his Instant Transmission ability to take Gohan, Vegeta, and Trunks with him to the Hyperbolic Time Chamber inside Kami's Lookout. The chamber only has a capacity of two so Goku allows Vegeta and Trunks to go in first. Goku explains a years worth of training in the chamber is actually only one day in the outside world. When Trunks and Vegeta step inside the chamber, all they see is a vast amount of nothingness. While this is going on, the androids arrive at the Kame House and ask for Goku's whereabouts. Piccolo refuses to tell them, which results in a fight between Piccolo and Android #17. Piccolo overpowers #17 and tries to finish him off, but #17 manages to dodge the attack. Back at Kami's Lookout, Vegeta and Trunks are due to be coming out of the time chamber any second now, which will reveal if it is possible to go beyond the level of a Super Saiyan.
73	19	"This is the Power of a Super-Namekian! #17 vs. Piccolo!" / "The Super Namekian Powers Up! Piccolo vs. Android 17!"; Transliteration: "Kore ga Sūpā Namekku-seijin no Chikara! Jūnana Gō Tai Pikkoro" (Japanese: これは、超ナメック星人の力! 17号対ピッコロ!)	148B–149	September 19, 2010	July 14, 2011
Bulma is hard at work trying to figure out Dr. Gero's prints. Meanwhile, Piccolo and Android #17 are fighting each other. After #17 gets serious, it turns out that he and Piccolo are evenly matched. Cell senses the two fighting and starts making his way towards them, stating that his power level is now higher than theirs. Krillin, and the others on a nearby island, receive a call from Bulma saying that she has completed the switch to shut down the androids and prepares to deliver it to the others. #17 states that since his stamina and power level will never drop, he will be the victor of the battle. However, Cell arrives at the scene of the battle, leaving Piccolo shocked. Meanwhile, Goku and Gohan are still waiting for Vegeta and Trunks to come out of the Hyperbolic Time Chamber.
74	20	"Run #17! Piccolo, A Battle for Suicidal Resistance" / "Run Android 17! Piccolo's All-or-Nothing Struggle!"; Transliteration: "Nigero Jūnana Gō! Pikkoro, Kenmei no Kōsen" (Japanese: 逃げろ17号! ピッコロ、懸命の抗戦)	150–151A	September 26, 2010	July 20, 2011
At Chi-Chi's suggestion, Krillin leaves the Kame House to intercept Bulma so he can obtain her shut-down device before Cell absorbs Androids #17 and #18. Unwilling to wait helplessly, Tien leaves the Kame House, as well, to help Piccolo on the battlefield. Meanwhile, #17 refuses to heed Piccolo's warnings about Cell, and is quickly defeated. Piccolo tries to ward off Cell, but Cell has become too powerful for him to handle. Cell quickly breaks Piccolo's neck, before blasting him through the chest at point-blank range, and then Cell tosses Piccolo's body into the sea. Then, Cell turns his attention to Android #17, intending to absorb him.
75	21	"Unmeasured Power! The Silent Warrior #16, Makes his Move" / "Power Unknown! Android 16 Breaks His Silence!"; Transliteration: "Jitsu-ryoku Mi-chisū! Kamoku na Senshi Jūroku Gō, Ugoku" (Japanese: 実力未知数! 寡黙な戦士16号、動く)	151B–152	October 3, 2010	July 21, 2011
Android #16 decides to enter the fight in order to prevent Cell from reaching his Perfect Form, because Cell's goal is not to kill Goku, but to destroy life. The two fight at an even level, with #16 landing a massive blast on Cell. However, Cell survives and uses the opportunity to absorb Android #17, to #16's horror. Cell transforms into his Semi-Perfect Form and gains incredible power, after which #16's attacks prove utterly ineffective. Just when all hope is lost, Tien appears and uses his Tri-Beam technique to hold off Cell so Android #16 and #18 can escape.
76	22	"Tenshinhan's Do-or-Die Shin Kikoho! Save Your Brother-in-Arms, Son Goku" / "Tien's Desperate Attack! Save Your Friends, Goku!"; Transliteration: "Tenshinhan, Kesshi no Shin Kikōhō! Senyū o Sukue, Son Gokū" (Japanese: 天津飯、決死の新気功砲! 戦友を救え、孫悟空)	153–154A	October 10, 2010	July 27, 2011
To Goku and Gohan's great concern, Tien repeatedly fires his Tri-Beam, drastically draining his ki in order to hold Cell down while Androids #16 and #18 escape. Tien eventually runs out of ki and collapses, at the mercy of a furious Cell. Unwillingly to wait idly at Kami's Lookout anymore, Goku uses his Instant Transmission to come to Tien's aid. While confronting Cell, Goku also notices that Piccolo is still alive, and teleports back to the Lookout with the two fallen warriors. Shortly afterward, Trunks and Vegeta emerge from the Hyperbolic Time Chamber, stating that they have successfully surpassed the level of Super Saiyan. They leave to confront Cell, while Goku and Gohan prepare to enter the time chamber for their own training. Meanwhile, Cell begins destroying islands in a bid to make #18 show herself.
77	23	"Super Saiyan Surpassed! The Daring Vegeta Strikes Cell" / "Beyond Super Saiyan! Vegeta Confronts the Monster Cell!"; Transliteration: "Sūpā Saiyajin o Koeta! Futeki na Bejīta, Seru o Utsu" (Japanese: 超サイヤ人を超えた! 不敵なべジータ、セルを討つ)	154B–156	October 17, 2010	July 28, 2011
Cell continues to destroy islands until only one remains, the one on which Androids #16 and #18 are hiding. Before he can launch his attack, Vegeta and Trunks arrive as Super Saiyans. After some taunting, Vegeta initiates a transformation that produces a form beyond that of Super Saiyan - evidenced by increased muscle size and an intense golden aura. As an Ascended Super Saiyan, Vegeta makes easy work of Cell while Trunks watches from the sidelines. Meanwhile, Goku and Gohan begin their training in the Hyperbolic Time Chamber, where Goku states that he will not only make Gohan a Super Saiyan, but that he will make Gohan stronger than even himself.
78	24	"The Surging Resentment of Cell! Kuririn, Destroy #18" / "Cell on the Verge of Defeat! Krillin, Destroy Android 18!"; Transliteration: "Seru Dotō no Kuyashigari! Kuririn, Jūhachi Gō o Hakai se yo" (Japanese: セル怒涛の悔しがり! クリリン、18号を破壊せよ)	157–158A	October 24, 2010	August 3, 2011
Goku continues to train Gohan, who is still trying to achieve the Super Saiyan form. Meanwhile, Vegeta effortlessly pushes Cell around and inflicts significant damage. When Cell uses Vegeta's own Galick Gun to no effect, he realizes that he will not be able to absorb Android #18. Enraged, Cell goes on about how if he was able to absorb #18 then he would become his perfect form and be able to defeat Vegeta easily. He attempts to persuade Vegeta into letting him absorb #18 by appealing to the Saiyan's passion for fighting strong opponents. Not far away, Krillin contemplates whether or not to use the emergency shutdown controller, and he has trouble deciding due to his embarrassing moment with Android #18 during their first encounter (when Android #18 kissed Krillin).
79	25	"And So the Situation Takes a Turn for the Worst... Cell Attacks #18!" / "The Battle Turns for the Worst... Cell Attacks Android 18!"; Transliteration: "Soshite Sai'aku no Jitai he... Seru, Jūhachi Gō ni Osoikakaru!" (Japanese: そして最悪の事態へ... セル、18号に襲いかかる!)	158B–160A	October 31, 2010	August 4, 2011
Krillin decides not to destroy #18, and stomps on the controller, which shocks Android #18. Krillin tells her that now is their chance to get off the island, and that she and Android #16 must leave now. Cell successfully persuades Vegeta to let him find and absorb Android #18, but Trunks is determined to prevent this and delivers his own beating to Cell. During a break in the action, Cell spots Krillin, #16, and #18, who are distracted by their own awkward meeting. Vegeta attempts to keep Trunks from interfering, forcing Trunks to attack his own father in order to prevent him from allowing Cell to reach his perfect form. While this is going on, Cell is savoring the moment and leisurely going about picking off Android #16 and Krillin. Despite their best efforts and a sound beating from Trunks, Cell is ultimately able to blind everyone via the Solar Flare, absorb #18, and achieve his Perfect Form.
80	26	"The Tables Have Turned! Perfect Form Cell, Finally Goes into Action" / "The Tables Are Turned! Witness the Power of Perfection!"; Transliteration: "Keisei Gyakuten! Kanzentai Seru, Tsui ni Shidō" (Japanese: 形勢逆転! 完全体セル、ついに始動)	160B–162A	November 7, 2010	October 10, 2011
Gohan asks Goku to get serious in his training, so Goku transforms into a Super Saiyan and fires a Kamehameha on Gohan. Gohan thinks of all the times he has let his friends down and gets angry, resulting in him finally turning into a Super Saiyan for the first time. Back at the battlefield, Vegeta disregards Cell's Perfect Form as nothing special and he is just the same as before. Meanwhile, Krillin is angry at Cell for absorbing Android #18, so he charges towards Cell and attempts to attack him by using his Kienzan technique, but the attack has no effect whatsoever. Cell then lightly kicks Krillin to one side, leaving him almost dead, but Trunks rushes to his aid and feeds him a Senzu bean, saving him from near death. Vegeta starts his fight with Cell and after a short while he soon realizes Cell's power far exceeds his own. In the background, Krillin and Trunks are talking about how Trunks has hidden his own true power, one even greater than Vegeta's but kept secret from him due to Vegeta's towering pride. Trunks plans to fight Cell when Vegeta is unconscious in order to hide his powers from Vegeta to prevent his father from losing his pride.
81	27	"Full-Power Strike of Vegeta! But the Terror of Cell Grows and Grows" / "Vegeta's Final Push! Defeat the Invincible Cell!"; Transliteration: "Bejīta Zenryoku no Ichigeki! Shikashi Takamaru Seru no Kyōfu" (Japanese: ベジータ全力の一撃! しかし高まるセルの恐怖)	162B–163	November 14, 2010	October 19, 2011
Desperate to kill Cell, Vegeta resorts to using his ultimate attack, the Final Flash. Vegeta calculates his attack and avoids destroying the entire Earth and also manages to take off Cell's right arm, but with Piccolo's genes Cell easily regenerates his arm. Cell knocks Vegeta unconscious and Trunks takes this chance to unleash his hidden powers onto Cell. Trunks momentarily lets Cell push him around a little in order to create a chance for Krillin to take the unconscious Vegeta to a safe location. Now that Vegeta is out of commission, Trunks and Cell can begin their real fight.
82	28	"Super Power Awakening! Trunks Surpasses his Father" / "The Strongest Super Saiyan! Trunks' Power Unleashed!"; Transliteration: "Chō Pawā Kakusei! Chichi o Koeta Torankusu" (Japanese: 超パワー覚醒! 父を超えたトランクス)	164–165	November 21, 2010	October 20, 2011
Trunks powers up to Ultra Super Saiyan, which appears to make him significantly stronger than Vegeta. Trunks and Cell seem to be evenly matched at first, but after a while Trunks' attack cease to hit Cell. Trunks decides to power up even more but he is still unable to connect his attacks to hit Cell. In the Hyperbolic Time Chamber, Goku manages to power up to the same bulked-up transformation as Trunks, but decides not to use that form, because in order to achieve that form, even though great power is gained, Goku concludes the decrease in speed is too much - and having power but not being able to hit your opponent is useless, so he decides to focus on mastering his normal Super Saiyan form instead. This turns out to be the same reason why Trunks cannot defeat Cell, and Trunks power level begins to drop due to the strain of maintaining his transformation. Cell learns that Goku is training to defeat him, so in order to waste time he decides to hold his own World Martial Arts Tournament where anyone can enter to fight him.

=== Cell Games Saga (2010–11) ===
No. overall	No. in saga	English translated title / English dub title	Corresponding DBZ ep.	Original release date	American air date
83	1	"The Television Has Been Hijacked! A Live Broadcast of the Cell Games Press Conference" / "Cell Invades the Airwaves! Announcing, 'The Cell Games!'"; Transliteration: "Terebi ga Nottorareta! Seru Gēmu Kaiken Namahō" (Japanese: テレビが乗っ取られた! セルゲーム会見生放)	166–167	November 28, 2010	October 26, 2011
When Krillin and Vegeta arrive, Trunks informs everyone of the tournament to be held by Cell and Android #16 asks to be taken back to Capsule Corporation where he can be repaired. Bulma also notifies everyone at Kami's Lookout to go there to meet up. After Cell finishes arranging his tournament, he then heads off to a news station to broadcast his message via television announcing details about his tournament, the "Cell Games," and states if that all the warriors lose to him, he will kill every single last human being. Meanwhile, Goku and Gohan are still training.
84	2	"Training Completed! Goku, Does he have the Composure to Defeat Cell?!" / "Training Complete! Goku Sizes Up the Competition!"; Transliteration: "Shūgyou Kanryō! Gokū, Datō Seru ni Yoyō Ari?!" (Japanese: 修行完了! 悟空、打倒セルに余裕あり!?)	168–169A	December 5, 2010	October 27, 2011
The people of Earth are in a panic after Cell's announcement of the Cell Games. Meanwhile, Goku and Gohan finish their training in the Hyperbolic Time Chamber, and emerged as Full Power Super Saiyans. Goku immediately requests that Mr. Popo prepare a meal and Trunks explains the latest Cell developments. Goku then teleports to the site of the Cell Games and confronts Cell. After returning to the Lookout, Goku announces he and Gohan will not be entering the time chamber again. Instead, for the remaining nine days until the Cell Games, they will train in the real world. Goku and Gohan then fly down to the Kame House to greet Chi-Chi and their remaining friends.
85	3	"An Interrupted Rest! The Self-Defense Army, Launches a General Offensive Against Cell" / "The Truce is Broken! The Defense Force Strikes Back at Cell!"; Transliteration: "Yaburareta Kyūsoku! Bōeigun, Seru ni Sōkōgeki" (Japanese: 破られた休息! 防衛軍、セルに総攻撃)	169B–172A	December 12, 2010	November 2, 2011
As Piccolo completes his training in the Hyperbolic Time Chamber, and Vegeta takes his place, Goku and Gohan are spending their days relaxing at home. Meanwhile, the Self-Defense Army attempt to launch an offensive strike against Cell, but they are completely wiped out. Hearing about this over the radio, Goku asks Piccolo if it is possible to separate with Kami, so he can use the Dragon Balls to revive all the people Cell killed. Since Piccolo can't separate, Goku theorises that he can convince another Namekian to stay on Earth and create a new set of Dragon Balls, and goes to King Kai's planet so he can find the Namekians.
86	4	"A New God! The Dragon Balls are Finally Revived" / "A New Guardian! The Return of the Dragon Balls!"; Transliteration: "Atarashī Kamisama! Doragon Bōru Tsui ni Fukkatsu" (Japanese: 新しい神様! ドラゴンボール遂に復活)	172B–175A	December 19, 2010	November 3, 2011
After getting help from King Kai in locating the new planet where the Namekians are living on, Goku travels there via Instant Transmission and explains the situation. The Grand Elder Moori offers Dende to be the new Kami, and Goku takes him back to Earth. Dende revives the Dragon Balls, revealing that this time they can grant two wishes. During the remaining days leading up to the Cell Games, Goku searches for the newly awakened Dragon Balls, Vegeta and the others finish their training, and the 24th World Martial Arts Tournament champion Mr. Satan announces to the world that he will defeat Cell. On the day of the Cell Games, it is revealed that if the new Dragon Balls are used to revive a mass of people, people who died before won't be revived. Despite the others' concern, Goku remains positive and they all head towards the Cell Games.
87	5	"Satan's Legion Runs Wild! The Curtain Rises on the Cell Games" / "Mr. Satan Takes the Stage! The Curtain Rises on the Cell Games!"; Transliteration: "Satan Gundan Ōabare! Seru Gēmu no Makuaki" (Japanese: サタン軍団大暴れ! セルゲームの幕開)	175B–176	December 26, 2010	November 9, 2011
As Mr. Satan hypes himself in front of the media, Vegeta, Android #16, Goku, Gohan, Piccolo, Trunks, Krillin, Tien, and Yamcha arrive at the stage. Mr. Satan insists he goes before him first, though when his students Caroni and Piroshki arrive, he allows them to go first, but they are defeated without Cell needing to move. Mr. Satan tries to intimidate Cell by breaking some tiles and then goes on the attack, but Cell knocks him out of the ring with a single blow, not even bothering to kill him. Cell wishes to take on a proper opponent, and Goku steps into the ring.
88	6	"Decisive Battle! Cell vs Son Goku" / "Showdown! Cell vs. Goku!"; Transliteration: "Kessen! Seru Tai Son Gokū" (Japanese: 決戦! セル対孫悟空)	177–178	January 9, 2011	November 10, 2011
Full Power Super Saiyan Goku and Cell begin to fight, and despite putting on an impressive performance, Gohan and Vegeta both realize that neither of them is using their full power yet. Both fighters then raise their power level to their maximum. After a brief battle, Cell begins to attack using techniques 'inherited' from other characters--first Tien's Multi-Form technique, then Piccolo's Makankosappo, and finally Frieza's heat-seeking Kienzan attack. When Goku overcomes each of these techniques, Cell prepares a full-power Kamehameha capable of destroying the Earth. Goku diverts the attack away from the planet by taking to the sky, and then uses the Instant Transmission to escape back to the ring. However, when Cell utilizes his full speed, he becomes too fast for Goku to keep up with him.
89	7	"A Battle of the Highest Level! Defeat Cell, Son Goku" / "Battle at the Highest Level! Goku Goes All Out!"; Transliteration: "Saikō Reberu no Tatakai! Seru o Taose, Son Gokū" (Japanese: 最高レベルの戦い! セルを倒せ、孫悟空)	179–180A	January 16, 2011	November 16, 2011
The battle between Goku and Cell continues, and Goku begins fighting at his max, with the two fighters reaching a pace that is barely visible to most of the onlookers. The power levels of both fighters are equal, and they land powerful blows on each other. Cell then decides to destroy the tournament ring, ensuring that their battle cannot be ended by a ring out and can continue until one of them either dies or surrenders. The battle becomes even more intense, culminating with Goku flying high into the sky building up a powerful Kamehameha. Cell and everyone else states that Goku is bluffing, since from his position in the sky, such an attack would easily destroy the Earth. Goku then unexpectedly uses his Instant Transmission to teleport himself right in front of Cell and executes the blast at point-blank range. While the rest of the world celebrates what they believe to be Cell's ultimate defeat, Goku and company watch as Cell's remaining lower half rises and regenerates his missing parts. While the ki of both fighters has depleted considerably, the battle continues on. Although Goku told Cell that Cell had depleted much of his power to regenerate himself, Goku has used up even more of his power, and the battles begins to turn in favor of Cell. Goku then launches a barrage of ki blasts at Cell in a desperate attempt to finish him.
90	8	"Conclusion to the Death Match! Time for Goku's Decision" / "The Opening Round Is Concluded! Goku's Moment of Decision!"; Transliteration: "Shitō ni Ketchaku! Gokū Ketsudan no Toki" (Japanese: 死闘に決着! 悟空決断の時)	180B–181	January 23, 2011	November 17, 2011
Despite everyone's hopes, Goku's barrage of ki blasts fails to destroy Cell when the android activates his energy barrier at the last second. Furthermore, it is clear to the rest of the Z Fighters that Goku has spent the last of his own energy. With all eyes and ears glued to this moment of truth for Goku's mysterious plan, the battle-worn Super Saiyan surprises everyone by surrendering. Adding further shock, he announces that Gohan will be the next and last contestant to fight Cell. Piccolo and Krillin protest this decision, but Gohan agrees and takes Cell on. Gohan impresses everyone with his power - which proves indeed to be on par with Goku's - but nevertheless finds himself on the losing side of the fight against Cell.
91	9	"Get Angry Gohan! Release Your Dormant Power" / "Get Angry, Gohan! Release Your Hidden Power!"; Transliteration: "Ikare Gohan! Nemureru Chikara o Hodoki" (Japanese: 怒れ悟飯! 眠れる力を解き)	182–183A	January 30, 2011	November 25, 2011
Full Power Super Saiyan Gohan shows no willingness to fight, and tries to convince Cell to end the Cell Games by explaining that if his hidden powers are brought to the surface, he will lose control and kill Cell. Counter to Gohan's intentions, this actually intrigues Cell, who decides to deliberately enrage Gohan by inflicting enough pain to force him to unleash his true strength. After watching Gohan take Cell's punishment, Android #16 intervenes. Taking advantage of the fact that he emits no detectable ki, #16 grabs Cell from behind and declares that he is going to trigger his self-destruct bomb.
92	10	"The Tears that Disappeared into the Sky! The Angry Super Awakening of Gohan" / "Tears For An Android! Gohan's Inner Rage Bursts Forth!"; Transliteration: "Sora ni Kieta Namida! Gohan, Ikari no Chō Kakusei" (Japanese: 空に消えた涙! 悟飯、怒りの超覚醒)	183B–184	February 6, 2011	December 19, 2011
To Android #16's surprise, Krillin reveals that Bulma had removed his self-destruct bomb during his repairs. With the risk of setting off the bomb gone, Cell blasts through #16--causing his body to shatter and leaving only his head intact. Cell realizing that Gohan cannot unleash his hidden powers in response to physical pain, he devises a plan to kill Gohan's friends by spawning seven offspring--the 'Cell Juniors'. Only Vegeta, Trunks, and Piccolo are able to hold their own against the Cell Juniors, while Krillin, Yamcha, Tien, and the fatigued Goku are unable to fight back. Gohan wants to unleash his power, but cannot figure out how. Meanwhile, #16's head has Mr. Satan carry him to Gohan. He sympathizes with Gohan's desire not to kill, but encourages him that it is okay to unleash his anger to save those that he loves. Cell crushes #16's head--an action that finally pushes Gohan over the edge, and triggers his transformation into a Super Saiyan 2.
93	11	"Fighting Spirit Free from Hesitation! Gohan, Pulverizes the Cell Juniors" / "Unleash the Warrior Within! Gohan Takes the Offensive!"; Transliteration: "Mayoi-naki Tōshi! Gohan, Seru Junia Funsai" (Japanese: 迷いなき闘志! 悟飯、セルジュニア粉砕)	185–186A	February 13, 2011	December 20, 2011
After witnessing the death of Android #16 at the hands of Cell, Gohan's anger is ignited and causes him ascend to the level of Super Saiyan 2. Cell is excited that the fight will be more interesting, but Gohan is unamused and snatches the stolen Senzu beans from Cell. Gohan then proceeds to take on all of the Cell Juniors, proving himself impervious to their attacks and effortlessly destroying them. He then throws the Senzu beans to Trunks, who distributes them to his injured comrades. Gohan now focuses his attention on Cell, and from the onset of the battle, it is clear that Gohan holds the advantage.
94	12	"The Perfect Form Breaks Down! Explosion, the Super Iron Fist of Rage" / "Perfection's End! A Fury Beyond Super Saiyan!"'; Transliteration: "Kanzentai Hōkai! Sakuritsu, Ikari no Chō Tekken" (Japanese: 完全体崩壊! 炸裂、怒りの超鉄拳)	186B–188A	February 20, 2011	December 21, 2011
Cell finally unleashes his full power against Gohan, but even at maximum strength his attacks have no effect on the Super Saiyan 2. Gohan cripples Cell with 2 powerful punches, leaving him in shock. Cell resorts to using two heat-seeking Kienzans, but Gohan is able to catch and destroy them. Then, Cell uses his Makankosappo, which Gohan easily deflects, and Cell's Death Beams are absorbed by Gohan. After being easily bested in battle, Cell attempts to destroy Gohan and the Earth with a giant, full-power Kamehameha, but Gohan produces an even stronger wave and reflects Cell's attack with ease. Gohan's attack absorbs Cell's, and the blast eventually overcomes Cell when he fails to deflect it. As the rest of the fighters predict an easy victory, Goku recalls that even in the Hyperbolic Time Chamber, Gohan displayed strength far beyond that of a normal Super Saiyan, recalling how Gohan had briefly transformed into a Super Saiyan 2 during their training (before passing out). Gohan's attack has also taken off Cell's legs, and parts of his arm and head. Goku then tells Gohan to deliver the finishing blow to Cell, but Gohan insists that Cell must suffer first. Cell regenerated his missing limbs, then utilizes his bulked-up form, but the increase in muscle mass lowers his speed greatly, and as a result none of his attacks connect with Gohan. Gohan counters with a powerful blow to Cell's head, and to his stomach, causing Cell to regurgitate Android #18 and revert to his Semi-Perfect Form. As the fighters assume that this means victory for Gohan, Cell's body begins to expand to a gigantic size.
95	13	"Bye-Bye Everyone! This is the Only Way to Save the Earth" / "A Hero's Sacrifice! Last Chance to Save the World!"; Transliteration: "Bai-Bai Min'na! Kore ga Chikyū o Sukū Yui'itsu no Michi" (Japanese: バイバイみんな! これが地球を救う唯一の道)	188B–189	March 6, 2011	December 22, 2011
Desperate to destroy Earth, Cell begins to self-destruct. With mere seconds left, Goku says goodbye to everyone and his son and teleports himself and Cell to King Kai's planet, the only safe place he could think of. Upon arrival, Cell finally explodes, destroying the planet and killing everyone there. As Gohan and the rest of the Z Fighters are left on Earth to grieve, Goku and King Kai realize that Cell has not accompanied them to the Other World, and therefore must have survived the explosion. Using Goku's Instant Transmission technique, Cell returns to Earth, where he kills Trunks with his Full Power Death Beam. Cell then reveals that not only did his nucleus survive the explosion, but he was able to regenerate into his Perfect Form - and thanks to his Saiyan genetics, he is far stronger than ever before (Cell's Super Perfect Form). Enraged by the death of his son, Vegeta unleashes a furious ki blast barrage at Cell, but is easily defeated, and is only saved from certain death when Gohan intercepts Cell's blast and takes the full force of the attack. With Gohan injured and his left arm broken, and nobody left to challenge Cell, Cell prepares one final Kamehameha to destroy Gohan and the Earth once and for all.
96	14	"Combine Our Power! The Mightiest Final Kamehameha" / "Combine Your Strength! The Final Kamehame-Ha!"; Transliteration: "Chikara Awasero! Saikyō Saigo no Kamehameha" (Japanese: 力合わせろ! 最強最後のかめはめ波)	190–191	March 20, 2011	December 23, 2011
Super Perfect Cell continues charging his Kamehameha, and reveals that not only has he gathered enough energy to destroy the Earth, but he also now has enough power to destroy the entire solar system with this blast. Cell also reveals that he will be able to use Instant Transmission to teleport away to safety before the blast detonates, allowing him to escape the Earth's destruction unscathed. Meanwhile, Vegeta apologizes to Gohan for his recklessness. As Gohan and the others watch on hopelessly, Goku contacts his son from the Other World via King Kai's telepathy and tells him that even in his injured state he has enough power to defeat Cell. Reinvigorated, Gohan prepares a final, one-handed Kamehameha to repel Cell's blast. As the two warriors struggle to overpower each other, Piccolo, Tien, Yamcha, and Krillin bombard Cell with ki blasts in a knowingly futile attempt to help, but are easily repelled. As Goku coaxes Gohan to release his full power against Cell, Vegeta launches one final Big Bang Attack, which temporarily distracts Cell. Seeing the opportunity, Gohan finally releases his full strength and overpowers Cell's blast, obliterating Cell and saving the Earth from destruction. Gohan has won and the Cell Games are finally over.
97	15	"Farewell with a Smile! Heading for New Days..." / "A Bittersweet Victory! Until We Meet Again!"; Transliteration: "Egao no Wakare! Atarashī Hibi e..." (Japanese: 笑顔の別れ! 新しい日々へ...)	192–193A	March 27, 2011	January 1, 2012
Following Cell's defeat, Gohan and the others return to Kami's Lookout. Mr. Satan, however, takes credit for defeating Cell, and the public celebrates Mr. Satan's "victory." At the Lookout, Dende heals Gohan and then summons Shenron. The first wish is used to successfully revive everyone killed by Cell, including Trunks. However, Goku cannot be revived, as Shenron has already brought him back to life once before. Dende suggests they can use the Namekian Dragon Balls, but at that moment, Goku contacts them from Other World through King Kai once more. Goku states his wish to remain dead, believing that the Earth will be safer without him attracting anymore villains there. With that, Goku bids his son and friends a final fond farewell. Krillin then asks Shenron to use the second wish to remove the bombs from inside Androids #17 and #18. The Z Fighters go their separate ways, and Gohan informs a heartbroken Chi-Chi of Goku's fate. The next day, Trunks bids farewell to everyone and begins his journey back to the future. As Trunks departs in his time machine, Gohan is seen smiling at his father's spirit in the sky.
98	16	"Bring Peace to the Future! Goku's Spirit is Eternal" / "Peace For the Future! The Spirit of Goku is Forever!"; Transliteration: "Mirai ni Heiwa o! Gokū no Tamashii yo Eien ni" (Japanese: 未来に平和を! 悟空の魂よ永遠に)	193B–194	August 2, 2011 (Home media only) (Note: This episode was originally scheduled to air in Japan on March 27, 2011 as the 98th episode, but Fuji TV postponed its broadcast to air news coverage on the Tōhoku earthquake and tsunami. The episode was eventually released as an "extra" episode on Blu-ray and DVD in Japan on August 2, 2011, and in North America on June 5, 2012.)	February 8, 2013
Trunks returns to the future and is reunited with Bulma. As tranquility seems to return, the androids are attacking again. Trunks saves an elderly man from being killed by Androids #17 and #18. Thanks to his training in the Hyperbolic Time Chamber, Trunks easily destroys the two androids. Three years later, Trunks prepares to head back into the past to tell everyone of his victory. However, there is still one more android to stop: Cell, in his Imperfect Form. After a brief fight, Trunks launches Cell into the air and destroys him with ease as well. Peace is finally restored to the future timeline. Back in the present, Goku begins his new "life" in the Other World.

=== World Tournament Saga (2014) ===
No. overall	No. in saga	English translated title / English dub title	Corresponding DBZ ep.	Original release date	American air date (Note: According to its online syndication system, Adult Swim aired episodes 99–125 of Dragon Ball Z Kai: The Final Chapters on Saturdays at 12 a.m. ET/PT, which is effectively Sunday morning. The airing dates of those episodes reflect the actual day of broadcast.)
99	1	"7 Years Since That Event! Starting Today, Gohan's a High Schooler" / "Seven Years Later! Starting Today, Gohan Is a High School Student"; Transliteration: "Are kara Shichi-nen! Kyō kara Gohan wa Kōkōsei" (Japanese: あれから7年！今日から悟飯は高校生)	200–201A	April 6, 2014	January 8, 2017
Seven years have passed since the battle with Cell. Gohan is now a high school student attending Orange Star High School, in Satan City. Gohan also has a younger brother named Goten, who was born after Goku died. On his way to his first day of high school, he comes across a bank robbery in the city and stops it with his Super Saiyan form. As rumors spread about a "Golden-Haired Warrior", Gohan gets to know his new classmate and Mr. Satan's daughter, Videl. After a day of trying not to act suspicious in front of his classmates, Gohan travels to Capsule Corporation to talk to Bulma about his problem.
100	2	"Found Out! The New Hero Is Son Gohan" / "A New Hero, Great Saiyaman, Is Born!"; Transliteration: "Barechatta! Nyū Hīrō wa Son Gohan" (Japanese: バレちゃった！新(ニュー)ヒーローは孫悟飯)	201B–202A	April 13, 2014	January 15, 2017
Gohan approaches Bulma, who gives him a transformation watch to hide his true identity. On his way home, Gohan encounters two people driving recklessly. This is where he comes up with the alias "Great Saiyaman", and scares the people into driving more safely on the road. Gohan returns home later that night, where Chi-Chi and Goten discover that Gohan now has a costume to conceal his identity while fighting crime. The next day, Videl is called in to stop a bus hijacking and handles the criminals, but the bus falls off a cliff, as nobody is driving the vehicle. Gohan uses the alias "Great Saiyaman" once again and pitches in to save Videl and the passengers.
101	3	"Videl's Crisis? Gohan's Urgent Call-out!"	202B–203	—	January 22, 2017
Soon after, Gohan saves the passengers of a plane about to crash and extinguishes a fire in a building in the city by destroying the water container. On his way to school, Gohan is chased by Videl in her helicopter, who is trying to deduce Great Saiyaman's identity. Gohan escapes by placing Videl's helicopter on the roof of a building. Both of them arrive to school late, which leads Videl to be even more suspicious of Gohan. Later, kidnappers from the Red Shark gang take the mayor of Satan City hostage. The police warn Videl of the situation, so she responds by confronting the gang's leader. Meanwhile, Gohan, growing impatient of class since he would rather assist Videl as the Great Saiyaman, starts aggressively tapping his foot, triggering an earthquake. He slides out of class during the confusion and arrives to the scene of the crime as the Great Saiyaman. Gohan saves the mayor of the city while stopping the attempts of the rest of the gang. Videl learns that Gohan was out of school at the same time. Videl is led to believe that Gohan and Great Saiyaman could really be the same person.
102	4	"A Monster Is Taken Away! The Culprit Is Great Saiyaman?"	204–205A	—	January 29, 2017
The next day, Gohan learns that Chobi, who is the child of Toto the pterodactyl, has been captured by a circus and put on display. In his attempt to rescue Chobi, Gohan is portrayed as a criminal. Videl pursues Gohan as a suspect. When Chobi's parents attack the city in search of their child, Gohan manages to handle the situation and return Chobi to his parents. Videl discovers the truth that Gohan is Great Saiyaman. Videl blackmails Gohan into participating in the 25th World Martial Arts Tournament. As some of the other Z Fighters express interest in the tournament, Goku calls out from the Other World and says he will return to Earth for a single day to participate.
103	5	"Entering the World Martial Arts Tournament! Goten Shows Off His Explosive Power During Training!"	205B–206	—	February 5, 2017
After Gohan spreads word of the tournament to the others as well as managing to convince Chi-Chi to let him participate himself, Gohan takes a leave of absence from school and begins training with Goten. Gohan is surprised to find that Goten not only possesses great strength, but he is also already capable of transforming into a Super Saiyan even though he has yet to learn how to fly. Videl comes around to have Gohan make good on his promise to teach her how to fly.
104	6	"Gohan is the Teacher! Videl's Introduction to Flight" / "Gohan the Teacher! Videl's Flying Technique Tutorial"; Transliteration: "Gohan ga Sensei! Bīderu no Bukū-jutsu Nyūmon" (Japanese: 悟飯が先生！ビーデルの舞空術入門)	207	April 20, 2014	February 12, 2017
Gohan starts her off with the basics of learning how to control her energy. Within a day, Videl has managed to learn how to float, while Goten has managed to learn how to fly. Following a remark from Gohan, Videl comes back the next day with her hair cut. Videl is determined to learn more from Gohan. Meanwhile, Vegeta is also surprised to find that Trunks is also capable of becoming a Super Saiyan, whose strength is slightly higher than Goten's. Goku trains fiercely in anticipation for the tournament.
105	7	"The Dragon Team, All Assembled! Son Goku has Returned!!" / "The Dragon Team Fully Assembled! Goku Has Come Back!"; Transliteration: "Doragon Chīmu Zen'in Shūgō! Kaettekita Son Gokū!!" (Japanese: ドラゴンチーム全員集合！帰ってきた孫悟空!!)	208–209A	April 27, 2014	February 19, 2017
After ten days of training, Videl manages to master flight. This finally gives Gohan and Goten the opportunity to resume their training for the tournament. On the day of the tournament, Gohan suggests to Vegeta, Goten, and Trunks that they do not use their Super Saiyan forms to avoid hassle from the press. Arriving at the island where the tournament will take place, Gohan and the others are greeted by Goku, whom Fortuneteller Baba had granted 24 hours visit to Earth. Goku meets Goten for the first time, while Piccolo destroys all the cameras in the area to keep Gohan's identity a secret. After the participating fighters register for the tournament, Goten and Trunks are forced to participate in the juniors division.
106	8	"Who Is the World's Greatest? The Tournament Preliminaries Begin!"	209B–210	—	February 26, 2017
The preliminary rounds begin. The fighters must hit a punching machine to rank their strength. The Dragon Team effortlessly qualifies for the tournament. Vegeta destroys the machine with a single punch. Afterwards, Goku and the others decide to go and watch the tournament of the juniors division.
107	9	"Everyone Is Shocked! Goten and Trunks' Super Battle!!" / "Everyone Is Surprised! Goten and Trunks' Super Battle!"; Transliteration: "Minna Bikkuri! Goten to Toranksu no Chō Batoru!!" (Japanese: みんなビックリ！悟天とトランクスの超バトル!!)	211	May 4, 2014	March 5, 2017
While Gohan and Videl wait to take their preliminaries, Goku, Vegeta, and the others go to spectate the junior division, where Goten and Trunks effortlessly progress through each round until they face each other in the final round. The battle gets more intense. Goten and Trunks surprise the audience with advanced techniques. The fight between Goten and Trunks continues.
108	10	"The Junior Champ Is Finally Decided! Who Will Fight Against Mr. Satan?"	212–213	—	March 12, 2017
While Trunks seems to have the advantage, Goten transforms into a Super Saiyan free himself from his opponent's grasp. Trunks takes on a challenge by trying to beat Goten with only his right arm. The latter also becomes a Super Saiyan and sends an energy ball to hit Goten, which lands on a part of the bleachers. The final juniors division match eventually comes to an end, where a sneak attack by Trunks causes Goten to lose by ring out. Trunks wins the battle as well as the juniors division tournament. Trunks will fight Mr. Satan in an exhibition match. Mr. Satan watched the fight between Goten and Trunks. He is reminded of the battle with Cell. Mr. Satan faces a problem because he has to fight against Trunks. After various attempts to try getting out of the fight, Mr. Satan decides to pretend to lose and have Trunks hold back his attack in order to keep up his public appearance. Trunks' weakest punch manages to send Mr. Satan flying out of the ring.
109	11	"A Troubling Premonition! The Appearance of a Mysterious Warrior!!" / "Restless Foreboding; A Mysterious Warrior Appears!"; Transliteration: "Haran no Yokan... Nazo no Senshi Arawaru!!" (Japanese: 波乱の予感... 謎の戦士現る!!)	214	May 11, 2014	March 19, 2017
During an intermission, Trunks and Goten decide to take out one of the participants and steal his clothes. Trunks and Goten take his place in the adult division. As Goku and the others get something to eat, they encounter a pair of mysterious participants named Shin and Kibito, whom Piccolo determines as not being from Earth. As the sixteen qualifying participants gather together to decide the drawings for the first round, Gohan is paired up against Kibito. Goku gets paired up against Vegeta.
110	12	"What's the Matter, Piccolo?! An Unexpected Conclusion to the First Round" / "What Happened, Piccolo? An Unexpected Outcome in the First Round"; Transliteration: "Dōshita Pikkoro!! Ikkai-sen de no igai na ketsumatsu" (Japanese: どうしたピッコロ!! 一回戦での意外な結末)	215	May 18, 2014	March 26, 2017
As the drawings come to a close, Piccolo is put up against Shin. Android 18 is put up against Mr. Satan. After Krillin wins his first match against his opponent, Piccolo and Shin face off against each other. As Piccolo senses an overwhelming power coming from Shin, he decides to forfeit the match before it even begins. Piccolo feels Shin's power is far beyond his own. Videl prepares to go up against a man named Spopovitch.
111	13	"An Eerie Entity; Who Exactly Is Spopovich?"	216	—	April 2, 2017
Piccolo abandons his fight against Shin. Piccolo learns from Kibito that Shin is actually the Supreme Kai. The Supreme Kai is believed to be even more powerful than the Grand Kai. Videl fights against Spopovitch. Videl appears to get the upper hand in her match, but Spopovitch keeps getting up and eventually fights back. Meanwhile, Goku realizes that Spopovitch has acquired new powers since his previous fight with Mr. Satan. Spopovitch continues fighting even after Videl breaks his neck. Seeing his opponent tired, Spopovitch regains the lead over Videl. Videl attempts to use her flight to regain her strength, but Spopovitch follows her into the air and uses an energy blast against her. As Videl refuses to give up despite the beating she is taking, Goku wonders where Spopovitch got his power from.
112	14	"Videl Is Worn Ragged, Gohan's Anger at Its Limits!!" / "Videl Battered! Gohan's Fury Reaches Its Limit!"; Transliteration: "Bīderu boroboro, Gohan no ikari mo genkai da!!" (Japanese: ビーデルボロボロ 悟飯の怒りも限界だ!!)	217	May 25, 2014	April 9, 2017
As Spopovitch nearly beats Videl to death, Gohan loses his temper and prepares to storm onto the field. Spopovitch's partner, Yamu, convinces Spopovitch to end the fight by pushing Videl out of the ring. With Videl heavily injured, Goku uses his Instant Transmission to gather some Senzu beans from Korin. Videl is sent to the infirmary to recover from her injuries. Gohan prepares to fight against Kibito.
113	15	"A Creeping Conspiracy! The Target Is Gohan"	218–219A	—	April 16, 2017
Goku uses his Instant Transmission to deliver some Senzu beans to Gohan from Korin. Gohan rushes to the infirmary to give one to Videl. Gohan gives a Senzu bean to Videl to restore her to full health. Gohan's identity as Great Saiyaman is revealed to his classmates after his bandana was blown off during his outburst. Gohan steps up to fight Kibito, who requests to see Gohan's Super Saiyan 2 transformation. After Piccolo informs the other Z-Fighters of Shin's identity as the Supreme Kai, he orders Gohan to transform. Shin asks Goku and the others not to intervene. Right after Gohan transforms, Spopovitch and Yamu hold him down and use a device to drain his Super Saiyan energy. With their mission accomplished, Spopovitch and Yamu fly away. Gohan is left weakened. As Kibito offers to heal Gohan to full health, the Supreme Kai asks Goku and the others to join him in pursuing the culprits.
114	16	"A Slithering Conspiracy!! Secrets of the Terrible Majin" / "Terrifying Secret of the Majin; The Mastermind Revealed!"; Transliteration: "Osoroshiki Majin no Himitsu Kuromaku Shutugen!!" (Japanese: 恐ろしき魔人の秘密 黒幕出現!!)	219B–220A	June 1, 2014	April 23, 2017
As Goku and the others set off to join the Supreme Kai, Kibito uses his unique ability to restore Gohan's energy. Kibito, Gohan, and Videl set off after the others. Along the way, the Supreme Kai and Kibito explain to the others about how an evil wizard named Babidi is seeking to revive an evil being known as Majin Buu, who was responsible for the death of four Supreme Kais long ago. To accomplish this, he manipulated Spopovitch and Yamu to join the tournament and steal the Super Saiyan energy needed to break the seal placed on Buu. Unable to push her flight any further, Videl places her faith in Gohan and returns to the tournament grounds. Videl comes to understand that Gohan was the one who defeated Cell seven years earlier. Gohan and Kibito catch up to Goku's group. They arrive at the site of a buried spaceship. The Supreme Kai, Kibito, Goku, Vegeta, Gohan, and Krillin watch as Spopovitch and Yamu deliver Gohan's energy to Babidi and his partner, Dabura, the Demon King.
115	17	"The Heinous Mage Babidi and King of the Underworld Dabura's Trap" / "The Nefarious Wizard Babidi And Demon King Dabura's Trap"; Transliteration: "Gokuaku Madōshi Babidi to Ankoku Makai no Ō Dābura no Wana" (Japanese: 極悪魔導師バビディと暗黒魔界の王ダーブラの罠)	220B–221	June 8, 2014	April 30, 2017
Supreme Kai and Kibito warn Goku and the others about the malicious pair. Dabura is the strongest being of the Demon world. Babidi possesses magic powerful enough to sway Dabura to become his henchman. Babidi obtained the energy from Spopovitch and Yamu. Babidi deems Spopovitch and Yamu to be of no further use to him. Babidi kills Spopovitch with his magic. Babidi's other henchman, Pui Pui, kills Yamu. Babidi, Pui Pui, and Dabura detected the presence of the Z fighters. Babidi and Pui Pui head inside the spaceship. Dabura attacks Goku and the others. He immediately kills Kibito. Dabura fires his spit at Krillin and Piccolo, which turns them into stone. Goku and the others learn that they can only free Krillin and Piccolo by killing Dabura. Goku, Vegeta, Gohan, and the Supreme Kai chase after Dabura into the spaceship despite the Supreme Kai's warnings. Upon reaching the first floor, they are confronted by Pui Pui, who informs them they must face several floors before they can reach Babidi at the bottom. Goku, Vegeta, and Gohan do not think much of their opponent and play a game of rock-paper-scissors to decide who should fight him. Vegeta prepares to fight Pui Pui.
116	18	"Don't Underestimate a Super Saiyan! Vegeta and Goku's Full Throttle Power!" / "Don't Sell Super Saiyans Short! Vegeta and Goku's Full-Bore Power!"; Transliteration: "Sūpā Saiya-jin o Nameru na! Bejīta to Gokū no Zenkai Pawā!" (Japanese: 超サイヤ人をナメるな！ベジータと悟空の全開パワー！)	222–223A	June 15, 2014	May 7, 2017
Vegeta outmatches Pui Pui in terms of fighting skill. Babidi changes the stage to match that of the high gravity planet, Zun, where Pui Pui is at his top fighting form. This makes no difference to Vegeta, who obliterates his opponent and opens the way to the next floor. Believing that the Saiyans should not be underestimated, Babidi sends in his next warrior, Yakon. Babidi changes the stage to match that of Planet Ankoku. Even with the aid of the pitch black darkness, Yakon is no match for Goku's keen senses. When Goku turns Super Saiyan, Yakon uses his ability to consume light and sucks in Goku's energy, which causes Goku to revert to his normal state. Rather than finding an alternative way to fight, Goku feeds him more Super Saiyan energy until Yakon explodes from being overloaded. This allows Goku and the others to move onto the next stage.
117	19	"Who is the World's Greatest?! A Battle Royal Match to Decide!!" / "Whither Victory? A Battle Royal Championship Match!"; Transliteration: "Tenka'ichi wa Dare no Te ni! Batoru Roiyaru Kettei-sen!!" (Japanese: 天下一は誰の手に!? バトルロイヤル決定戦!!)	223B–224	June 22, 2014	May 14, 2017
As Babidi fears the power of the Saiyans, Dabura decides to face them himself. He goes inside a meditation chamber to raise his power before his battle. Meanwhile, back at the tournament, Goten and Trunks take a break from their Mighty Mask disguise to get some drinks. They barely avoid having their cover blown. With Goku and the other members still missing, Mr. Satan suggests that a battle royal be held between the remaining contestants. As the match begins, Killa and Jewel are quickly dispatched by Android #18 and Mighty Mask. Android #18 and Mighty Mask ignore Mr. Satan and fight each other.
118	20	"The Fearsome Children!! #18's Great Struggle" / "Stunning Youngsters! No. 18's Uphill Battle"; Transliteration: "Chibikko Osorubeshi!! Dai-Kusen no Jūhachi-Gō" (Japanese: チビッコ恐るべし!! 大苦戦の18号)	225–226A	June 29, 2014	May 21, 2017
As the battle between Android #18 and Mighty Mask continues to escalate, Android #18 struggles to keep up with her opponent's unpredictable moves. She manages to land a critical hit against Goten and Trunks and knocks them into the center of the stage. Goten and Trunks decide to switch places with Goten now on top and Trunks now on the bottom. This pushes Android #18 to the point, where she starts using energy blasts against them. Android #18 manages to hit back with support from her daughter Marron. Goten and Trunks decide to go Super Saiyan and launch a powerful blast at Android #18. She manages to dodge it and reveal their true identity. This results in the disqualification of Goten and Trunks, who was disguised as Mighty Mask and had also broken the rules of the Tournament and Goten and Trunks are forced to flee. Android #18 and Mr. Satan are the only remaining fighters left in the battle royal. Goten and Trunks come across Videl upon her return. Dabura emerges from his meditation chamber. He is ready to face off against Gohan.
119	21	"The Star Performer Takes the Stage! Take Down the Demon King!!" / "Enter the Headliner! The Looming Demon King!"; Transliteration: "Shin'uchi Tōjō! Tachihadakaru Maō!!" (Japanese: 真打ち登場！立ちはだかる魔王!!)	226B–227A	July 6, 2014	June 4, 2017
Noticing his complete lack of fighting skills after putting Mr. Satan in a headlock, Android #18 makes a deal with Mr. Satan to let him win the match and maintain his dignity in exchange for twice the prize money. Meanwhile, Goten and Trunks hear about the current situation from Videl. They become interested and head towards the action. Back at the spaceship, Dabura appears before Gohan and decides to give him a handicap by choosing an arena similar to Earth's environment. As the fight gets underway, both Gohan and Dabura bring out their full power against each other. Despite being hit by some of Dabura's powerful attacks, Gohan refuses to lose against him.
120	22	"A Wicked Heart Is Revived, Prince of Destruction Vegeta!" / "A Heart of Evil Awakened; Vegeta, Prince of Destruction"; Transliteration: "Yomigaeru Jashin Hakai ōji Bejīta!" (Japanese: よみがえる邪心 破壊王子ベジータ！)	227B–228A	July 13, 2014	June 11, 2017
As the battle between Gohan and Dabura continues, Vegeta's impatience to settle things with Goku catches the attention of Dabura. Dabura decides to abandon the fight and report to Babidi. Babidi and Dabura learn Vegeta still retains a lot of evil in his heart. Babidi uses his magic to target Vegeta's mind and sway him over to his side. To make matters worse, Babidi transports everyone to the tournament grounds, where Vegeta is still focused on his desire to defeat Goku. Majin Vegeta prepares to face off against Goku even with innocent bystanders watching.
121	23	"I'm the Strongest! The Clash of Goku vs. Vegeta" / "I Am the Strongest! The Clash of Goku vs. Vegeta"; Transliteration: "Saikyō wa Ore da! Gekitotsu Gokū tai Bejīta" (Japanese: 最強はオレだ！激突 悟空VSベジータ)	228B–229	July 20, 2014	June 18, 2017
Majin Vegeta begins his attack on Goku. Majin Vegeta kills many innocent people in the crowd without any remorse. Goku realizes that Vegeta had fallen under Babidi's spell on purpose for the sake of his grudge against Goku. Goku is left with no choice but to fight against him despite Supreme Kai's attempt to stop him. Goku asks Babidi to warp them to someplace else, where they can fight alone. Supreme Kai and Gohan decide to go on ahead and leave Goku and Majin Vegeta to their fight. Babidi attempts to command Majin Vegeta to kill them. Majin Vegeta's pride allows him to defy even Babidi's demands.
122	24	"Countdown to Revival: Crush Babidi's Ambitions!"; Transliteration: "Fukkatsu e no Kauntodaun, Babidi no Yabō o Uchikudake!" (Japanese: 復活へのカウントダウン バビディの野望を打ち砕け！)	230–231A	August 3, 2014	June 25, 2017
While Goku and Majin Vegeta's fight gets underway, energy builds up for Majin Buu each time Goku takes damage. Gohan and Supreme Kai arrive at Majin Buu's egg, where they are confronted by Babidi and Dabura. Before the fight between them can begin, Majin Buu's egg reaches full power because of the energy released during Goku and Majin Vegeta's battle.

=== Majin Buu Saga (2014) ===
No. overall	No. in saga	English translated title / English dub title	Corresponding DBZ ep.	Original release date	American air date
123	1	"The Seal Is Broken!? Gohan's Kamehameha of Resistance" / "The Seal Is Released? Gohan's Kamehame-Ha of Resistance"; Transliteration: "Toketa Fūin!? Gohan no Teikō no Kamehameha" (Japanese: 解けた封印!? 悟飯抵抗のかめはめ波)	231B–232A	August 10, 2014	July 9, 2017
Goku and Majin Vegeta's fight continues to escalate. Majin Vegeta reveals he chose to go under Babidi's control to gain the strength to face off against Goku, and also since Vegeta felt that he needed to get rid of his gentle side. As the seal containing Majin Buu starts to break, Gohan attempts to stop Majin Buu from reaching full power by shooting multiple Kamehameha blasts at the egg in an attempt to destroy it. Following the attack, the egg splits apart, but only pink smoke comes out of it. Supreme Kai presumes that Majin Buu had been destroyed. However, Gohan senses a powerful energy from the pink smoke, which coalesces together to form Majin Buu, who appears to be nothing more than a mere fat child.
124	2	"A Straight Line to Despair!? Terror of Majin Buu" / "Straightaway Into Despair? The Terror of Majin Buu"; Transliteration: "Zetsubō e Itchokusen!? Majin Bū no Kyōfu" (Japanese: 絶望へ一直線!? 魔人ブウの恐怖)	232B–234A	August 17, 2014	July 16, 2017
Everyone seems to be bewildered by Majin Buu's childlike behavior. They are curious as to whether his rebirth was actually unsuccessful. However, Majin Buu soon shows off his frightening strength when he effortlessly beats Dabura. The rise in Majin Buu's power level catches the attention of the other Saiyans. Although Goku tries to convince Majin Vegeta to postpone the fight in order to stop Majin Buu, Majin Vegeta knocks out Goku when he drops his guard, after Majin Vegeta realized that he let Buu out of his shell and decides to make the right decision for himself. Majin Vegeta takes Goku's last Senzu bean and sets off to fight Majin Buu himself. Gohan and Supreme Kai attempt to flee from Majin Buu, but he easily catches up to them. Majin Buu proves himself to be immune to Supreme Kai's attacks.
125	3	"Turn Into Sweets! A Hungry Majin's Weird Power" / "Turn Into Candy! A Hungry Majin's Bizarre Power!"; Transliteration: "Okashi ni Nacchae! Harapeko Majin no Bukimi Pawā" (Japanese: お菓子になっちゃえ！腹ペコ魔人の不気味パワー)	234B–235A	August 24, 2014	July 23, 2017
Majin Buu completely overwhelms Supreme Kai and Gohan. Supreme Kai uses the last of his strength to make sure Gohan survives Majin Buu's attack. Majin Vegeta has witnessed that Gohan has been killed and decides to blow up Babidi's spaceship. Before Majin Buu can destroy Supreme Kai, he is attacked by Dabura, who believes Buu cannot be made to obey anyone. Meanwhile, Goten and Trunks arrive nearby, and Trunks inadvertently breaks the petrified Piccolo. Unfazed by Dabura's attacks, Majin Buu uses his unique ability to turn Dabura into a cookie and eats him. This nullifies the petrification on Krillin and Piccolo. Piccolo survived being broken, thanks to his regenerative abilities. Before Majin Buu can do the same to Supreme Kai, Majin Vegeta arrives on the scene.
126	4	"I'll Take Care of the Majin, Vegeta's Final Desperate Battle!" / "I Will Deal With the Majin! Vegeta's Final Mortal Combat!"; Transliteration: "Majin wa Ore ga Katadzukeru, Bejīta Saigo no Kesshi-sen!" (Japanese: 魔人はオレがかたづける ベジータ最期の決死戦！)	235B–236A	August 31, 2014	July 29, 2017 (Note: Adult Swim moved Dragon Ball Z Kai: The Final Chapters from 12 a.m. to 11:30 p.m. ET/PT, making the airdates from episodes 126 onward actually on Saturday.)
Majin Vegeta is willing to put his life on the line to destroy Majin Buu. Majin Vegeta begins his assault on Majin Buu, after confronting him for killing Gohan, as Piccolo becomes shocked and horrified by what Vegeta has said. He manages to blast a hole through him. However, Majin Buu manages to regenerate himself and builds up his anger to create a giant explosion. This deals a great amount of damage to Majin Vegeta.
127	5	"For Those Whom He Loves... The Last Moment of the Proud Warrior!" / "For His Beloved Ones... The End of the Proud Warrior!"; Transliteration: "Aisu Beki Mono no Tame ni... Hokori Takaki Senshi no Saigo!" (Japanese: 愛すべき者のために... 誇り高き戦士の最期！)	236B–237	September 7, 2014	August 5, 2017
As Majin Vegeta is ensnared by Majin Buu, Trunks and Goten can no longer stand by. They rush to the scene to rescue him. Piccolo attacks the defenseless Babidi and rips him to pieces. Feeling he cannot defeat Majin Buu with conventional means, Majin Vegeta says his farewells to Trunks before knocking both children out. Majin Vegeta instructs Piccolo to take them far away and Piccolo warns Majin Vegeta that he is going to die. Majin Vegeta tells Piccolo if he is still going to see Goku in Otherworld, but Piccolo tells him no, because of his selfishness, he will lose his body when he dies, but Majin Vegeta doesn't care and tells Piccolo to leave. Once everyone is cleared from the scene, Majin Vegeta uses his last resort move. Majin Vegeta overloads his Super Saiyan 2 form and sacrifices himself in a massive self-destructive explosion in order to obliterate Majin Buu.
128	6	"The Nightmare Returns; The Immortal Monster, Majin Buu!" / "A Nightmare Revisited: The Immortal Monster Majin Buu!"; Transliteration: "Akumu Sairai; Fujimi no Kaibutsu, Majin Bū!" (Japanese: 悪夢再来 不死身の怪物 魔人ブウ！)	238	September 14, 2014	August 12, 2017
As Bulma and the others from the stadium follow Videl's directions in pursuit of Goten and Trunks, they are hit by the shock wave from Majin Vegeta's attack and almost crash. They are saved by Android #18. After Majin Vegeta's body turns into stone and disintegrates following his self-destructive explosion, Piccolo leaves Goten and Trunks with Krillin. Piccolo tells Krillin to inform the others that Majin Vegeta and possibly Gohan have been killed. He investigates the site of Majin Vegeta's sacrificial attack and finds various charred fragments of Majin Buu. Babidi narrowly survived the explosion. However, Piccolo is shocked to witness Majin Buu's fragments suddenly come to life and reassemble to bring Majin Buu back to his normal form. Majin Buu uses his power to heal Babidi, who vows to make the planet suffer. Piccolo decides to take Goten and Trunks up to Dende's Lookout. Goku regains consciousness and tries to determine the situation after learning that Vegeta knocked him unconscious and decided to fight Buu alone and also took the last sensu bean and decides to teleport to Kami's Lookout as he witnessed that Piccolo and Krillin are restored to normal. A weakened Supreme Kai searches for Gohan, whose fate is still unknown.
129	7	"Secret Plan to Defeat Buu, Its Name Is Fusion!" / "A Secret Plan to Defeat Buu! Its Name Is Fusion"; Transliteration: "Bū o Taosu Hisaku, Sono Na wa Fyūjon!" (Japanese: ブウを倒す秘策 その名はフュージョン！)	239–240A	September 21, 2014	August 19, 2017
Bulma's group goes to seek out the Dragon Balls so they can revive all the spectators that Majin Vegeta killed. They come up against a large dragon while trying to get the last Dragon Ball. Piccolo and Krillin leave Goten and Trunks in the care of Dende and Mr. Popo. They are soon joined by Goku, who learns about the situation. Goku states he is not strong enough to defeat Majin Buu. He mentions having learned a technique known as Fusion, which allows two similarly built fighters to merge to become a single powerful fighter. Goku had originally planned to do this himself with either Gohan or Vegeta. Goku realizes from Mr. Popo that he can instead teach this technique to Goten and Trunks due to their similar size.
130	8	"A Faint Hope in Sight! The Warriors Wake Up!!" / "Found! A Faint Ray of Hope - Awaken, Warriors!"; Transliteration: "Mieta! Kasukana Kibō, Me o Samase Senshi-tachi!!" (Japanese: 見えた！かすかな希望 目を覚ませ戦士達!!)	240B–241A	September 28, 2014	August 26, 2017
Bulma uses the Dragon Balls and summons Shenron. She uses one of its wishes to bring back everyone who had been killed that day. As using all three wishes would mean they would have to wait another year before they can use the Dragon Balls again, Goku warps over to Bulma's group and convinces Shenron to postpone the other two wishes. This shortens the time to four months when summoning Shenron again. Kibito was revived by the wish. Kibito manages to find Supreme Kai and heal his injuries. Supreme Kai and Kibito manage to find Gohan. They decide to bring him to the Sacred World of the Kais. Goku uses his Instant Transmission to teleport Bulma and the others to Dende's Lookout, where he informs them of the grim situation concerning Gohan and Vegeta which shocks the others, including Chi-Chi, Videl and Bulma. Afterwards, Babidi announces his message to the world.
131	9	"Find the Nuisances, Babidi's Revenge Plan Begins!!" / "Find the Nuisances: Babidi's Retaliation Begins!"; Transliteration: "Jama-sha o Sagase, Babidi no Fukushū Sakusen Kaishi!" (Japanese: 邪魔者を探せ バビディの復讐作戦開始！)	241B–242	October 5, 2014	September 9, 2017
Babidi announces that he will have Majin Buu destroy the planet unless Piccolo, Goten, and Trunks are brought to them within five days. Piccolo almost sets off, but Goku convinces him to stay. He says they can bring back everyone who dies with the Dragon Balls. Supreme Kai, Kibito, and Gohan arrive in the Sacred World of the Kais, where Supreme Kai reveals he wants Gohan to master the legendary Z-Sword in order to defeat Majin Buu. Back at Dende's Lookout, Goten and Trunks wake up and are given a crash course in Fusion by Goku, after learning about the demise of Gohan and Vegeta.
132	10	"The Time of Ordeal, Attain the Legendary Power!" / "A Time of Trials! Lay Hold of Legendary Powers!"; Transliteration: "Shiren no Toki, Densetsu no Chikara o te ni Irero!" (Japanese: 試練の時 伝説の力を手に入れろ！)	243–244A	October 12, 2014	September 16, 2017
Using his Super Saiyan 2 strength, Gohan manages to pull the Z-Sword from its resting place. He finds it to be incredibly heavy. Meanwhile, Babidi makes another broadcast of Majin Buu laying waste to another city. This prompts Goten and Trunks to contact him. Goten and Trunks inform him that they will soon grow strong enough to defeat them. Goten and Trunks begin their Fusion training. They learn how to match their Super Saiyan energy with each other. Meanwhile, Babidi learns where Trunks lives. He announces his plans to attack Capsule Corporation in West City.
133	11	"Delay Majin Buu, The Limit! Super Saiyan 3!!" / "Hold Majin Buu in Check! Limit — Super Saiyan 3!"; Transliteration: "Majin Bū o Kuitomero, Rimitto! Sūpā Saiya-jin Surī!!" (Japanese: 魔人ブウを食い止めろ 限界！超サイヤ人3!!)	244B–245A	October 19, 2014	September 23, 2017
Realizing that they will not be able to find the Dragon Balls if the Dragon Radar is destroyed, Goku orders Trunks to fly to West City to retrieve the Dragon Radar from Capsule Corporation. Goku leaves to delay Majin Buu and Babidi. In order to buy Trunks some time, Goku builds up a large amount of energy. This also uses some of his remaining time on Earth. Goku transforms into his ultimate form that follows Super Saiyan 2 known as Super Saiyan 3. The immense power of Super Saiyan 3 is felt even in the Sacred World of the Kais.
134	12	"Standing Up For Himself, Buu's Rebellion!" / "True Worth Beginning to Show - The Treacherous Buu!"; Transliteration: "Mie Hajimeta Shinka, Hangyaku no Bū" (Japanese: 見え始めた真価 反逆のブウ)	245B–246	October 26, 2014	September 30, 2017
Goku begins his battle against Majin Buu, who demonstrates an ability to copy other people's techniques. Trunks arrives at Capsule Corporation, but he struggles to find where the Dragon Radar is. Bulma realizes that she had left the Dragon Radar in her airplane. She manages to inform Trunks about it. Goku senses Trunks has accomplished his mission. Goku undoes his Super Saiyan 3 transformation once more. He takes his leave after informing Majin Buu that Trunks and Goten will be ready to fight him in two days. Shortly after Goku leaves, Majin Buu decides he has no further use for Babidi. Wanting to be free of Babidi's control, Majin Buu turns against him and kills Babidi.
135	13	"Awful Looking!? Special Training, Fusion Pose!" / "Silly Looking? Drilling the Fusion Pose!"; Transliteration: "Kakko Warui!? Tokkun, Fyūjon Pōzu!" (Japanese: カッコ悪い!? 特訓、フュージョンポーズ！)	247	November 2, 2014	October 7, 2017
Without Babidi to order him around, Majin Buu continues to freely destroy cities while waiting for his opponents. Goku has less than thirty minutes left on Earth due to the energy spent in the Super Saiyan 3 form. Goku wastes no time teaching Goten and Trunks the key to the Fusion technique. The Fusion technique is a somewhat embarrassing-looking Fusion Dance.
136	14	"Bye-Bye Everyone!! Son Goku Returns to the Other World" / "Bye-bye, Everyone! Goku Returns to the Next World"; Transliteration: "Bai Bai Min'na!! Son Gokū Ano Yo ni Kaeru" (Japanese: バイバイみんな!! 孫悟空あの世に帰る)	248–249A	November 9, 2014	October 14, 2017
Majin Buu lays waste to another village and turns its citizens into clay in order to build himself a house for a brief rest. Meanwhile, Goten and Trunks are slightly bored from their training. They ask Goku to show them his Super Saiyan 3 transformation. Upon doing this, Goku uses up the remainder of his time on Earth. After saying goodbye to everyone, Goku returns to the afterlife and leaves the Fusion training in the hands of Piccolo. Meeting up with King Yemma, Goku is relieved to hear that Gohan is not dead, and he decides to follow his energy trail.
137	15	"Found You, Gohan! Harsh Training in the Realm of the Kais!" / "Gohan Located! Intensive Training in the World of the Kais!"; Transliteration: "Mitsuketa, Gohan! Kaiōshin-kai de Mōtokkun!" (Japanese: 見つけた、悟飯！界王神界で猛特訓！)	249B–250A	November 16, 2014	October 21, 2017
Goku arrives in the Sacred World of the Kais, where Gohan is training with the Z-Sword. Goku decides to help Gohan with his training. Meanwhile, Majin Buu has already killed two thirds of Earth's population. He comes across a blind young boy and heals his vision. Majin Buu becomes surprised when he thanks him instead of being afraid. With Gohan growing more proficient with the Z-Sword, Goku tests out the sword's sharpness by throwing a metal cube at it. Gohan inadvertently breaks the sword in half instead. From the broken sword emerges the Supreme Kai of fifteen generations ago, Old Kai.
138	16	"Birth! Combine Super Warrior, His Name Is Gotenks!!" / "Birth of a Merged Superwarrior His Name Is Gotenks!"; Transliteration: "Tanjō! Gattai Chō Senshi Sono na wa, Gotenkusu!!" (Japanese: 誕生！合体超戦士 その名は、ゴテンクス!!)	250B–251	November 23, 2014	November 4, 2017
After some dubious persuasion from Goku, Old Kai reveals he has the ability to draw out someone's true power beyond their limits. This turns out to be a lengthy process that can take over a day to complete. Meanwhile, Goten and Trunks try out the Fusion Pose for real, but an error in the Fusion Pose results in the merged fighter, Gotenks, ending up with a failed transformation. After another failure, Goten and Trunks eventually perform a successful fusion and transform into the true Gotenks. Gotenks is confident that he can defeat Majin Buu with his current power level. He goes off in search of Majin Buu despite Piccolo's warnings.
139	17	"Who Will Be the One to Defeat the Majin? The Beginning of the Strongest Man!!" / "Who Will Defeat Majin Buu? The Mightiest of Men Moves Out!"; Transliteration: "Majin o Taosu no wa Dareda? Saikyō no Otoko Shidō!!" (Japanese: 魔人を倒すのは誰だ？最強の男始動!!)	251B–252	November 30, 2014	November 11, 2017
Gotenks arrives to fight against Majin Buu. Despite showing a great amount of strength, Gotenks is overwhelmed by Majin Buu's power. Gotenks barely manages to escape from Majin Buu after he launches an all-out attack against the armed forces. Meanwhile, Mr. Satan reluctantly confronts Majin Buu, who becomes amused with his traps disguised as presents. Majin Buu decides to befriend Mr. Satan.
140	18	"The Power-Up Continues!? Perfected! Super Gotenks!" / "The Powering Up Continues? Super Gotenks Is Achieved!"; Transliteration: "Pawā-Appu wa Tsudzuku!? Kansei! Sūpā Gotenkusu!" (Japanese: パワーアップは続く!? 完成！超ゴテンクス！)	253	December 7, 2014	November 18, 2017
After completing his ceremony, Old Kai instructs Gohan to sit still for the next 20 hours in order to complete the power-up. Meanwhile, Goten and Trunks learn how to perform the fusion while in Super Saiyan form to become Super Saiyan Gotenks. Super Gotenks's cockiness almost leads him to confront Majin Buu again, but he ends up retreating when the fusion time runs out. Elsewhere, Majin Buu inadvertently befriends a small dog after healing its injured leg, while Mr. Satan almost manages to convince Majin Buu to stop killing humans. However, a hunter looking to take down Majin Buu for himself relentlessly shoots the dog, which leaves Majin Buu shocked and infuriated.

=== Evil Buu Saga (2014–15) ===
No. overall	No. in saga	English translated title / English dub title	Corresponding DBZ ep.	Original release date	American air date
141	1	"Born From Anger - Another Majin!" / "What Anger Gives Rise to Another Majin!"; Transliteration: "Ikari ga Umidashita mono, Mō Hitori no Majin!" (Japanese: 怒りが産み出したモノ もうひとりの魔人！)	254–255A	December 14, 2014	December 2, 2017
After managing to calm down Majin Buu's rage by dealing with the thugs himself, Mr. Satan discovers that the dog is barely alive. Majin Buu manages to heal the dog just in time. As Majin Buu, Mr. Satan, and the dog start becoming closer, Mr. Satan decides to stop taking advantage of Majin Buu's innocence and becomes his earnest friend. However, one of the thugs from earlier shows up and shoots Mr. Satan, which causes Majin Buu to be overcome with anger. After healing Mr. Satan, Majin Buu instructs him and the dog to get away from him. The evil in his body escapes and transforms into a tall, grey, emaciated and evil version of Majin Buu.
142	2	"Buu Eats Buu - A New Majin Attacks!!" / "Buu Gobbles Up Buu! Onslaught of a New Majin!"; Transliteration: "Bū ga Bū o Tabechatta, Aratana Majin Shūrai!!" (Japanese: ブウがブウを食べちゃった 新たな魔人襲来!!)	255B–256A	December 21, 2014	December 9, 2017
Good Buu attempts to fight against the Evil Buu, but he finds out that he is much weaker, since most of his power had been transferred over to his evil side. As a result, Evil Buu manages to reflect Good Buu's candy attack back at him, which turns him into chocolate, and then eats him. This allows Evil Buu to absorb his benign counterpart and assume a more complete form, Super Buu. However, traces of Good Buu prevents him from attacking Mr. Satan and Bee. Sensing the energy of Piccolo and the others, Super Buu arrives at Dende's Lookout and demands to fight against Gotenks. Piccolo attempts to stall for time by telling Super Buu to wait until all of the Earthlings are killed. Piccolo instructs Krillin to bring Goten and Trunks to the Hyperbolic Time Chamber, in order to make use of what little time they have.
143	3	"Head Straight towards the Catastrophe! One Hour Time Limit!!" / "Headlong Rush Into Catastrophe! A One-Hour Time Limit!"; Transliteration: "Hakyoku e Masshigura! Taimu Rimitto wa Ichi Jikan!!" (Japanese: 破局へまっしぐら！タイムリミットは1時間!!)	256B–257A	December 28, 2014	December 16, 2017
Piccolo's hopes of being able to buy some time are dashed when Super Buu unleashes a powerful homing attack, which targets and kills every human on the Earth except for Mr. Satan, Tien, and Chiaotzu. Piccolo, along with Videl, manages to convince Super Buu to wait for an hour so that Goten and Trunks can train. Meanwhile, Gohan is tired of waiting any longer for Old Kai's power-up. However, he discovers that he has indeed managed to increase his power, so Gohan agrees to wait for the power-up to be completed. Becoming further angered when Super Buu kills an impatient Chi-Chi, Goten barely holds in his anger and joins Trunks in the Hyperbolic Time Chamber after Piccolo informs Goten that Chi-Chi and Gohan will be brought back to life with the Dragon Balls. With Super Buu growing impatient after only thirty minutes, Piccolo tries to buy as much time as possible as he slowly leads Super Buu to the Hyperbolic Time Chamber. Piccolo believes that even if Goten and Trunks fail, they can destroy the Hyperbolic Time Chamber's entrance and trap him there.
144	4	"Special Training Completed! You're Finished Now, Majin Buu!!" / "Training Complete! You're Finished Now, Majin Buu!"; Transliteration: "Tokkun Kanryō! Kore de Owari da Majin Bū!!" (Japanese: 特訓完了！これで終わりだ魔人ブウ)	257B–258A	January 11, 2015	January 6, 2018
Piccolo continues to lead Super Buu to the Hyperbolic Time Chamber, while Goten and Trunks train hard to avenge the loved ones that they have lost. After rerouting Super Buu through Dende's Lookout, Super Buu is extremely unhappy and throws tantrums. Due to this, Piccolo finally takes Super Buu to the Hyperbolic Time Chamber. After a warm-up round and playing around, Super Buu and Gotenks begin to fight. Gotenks decides to use some of his new special moves. The problem is that these moves, while flashy, are ineffective against Super Buu. The special moves used by Gotenks have ridiculous names such as the "Screaming Angry Wombat". After it is clear that these moves have no effect, Super Gotenks talks strategy with Piccolo. He creates a ring of energy called the "Galactic Doughnut" and uses it to trap Super Buu. After a brief struggle, Super Buu is able to break the ring.
145	5	"Buu Eliminated with Ghosts! A Surefire Kamikaze Attack!!" / "Eliminating Buu with Ghosts: A Knockout Kamikaze Attack!"; Transliteration: "Obake de Bū Taiji Hissatsu! Kamikaze Atakku!!" (Japanese: オバケでブウ退治 必殺！カミカゼアタック!!)	258B–259	January 18, 2015	January 13, 2018
Super Gotenks and Super Buu continue to fight. Super Gotenks decides to use another one of his special moves called the Super Ghost Kamikaze Attack. He spits out a ghost of himself, and he plans to use it against Super Buu. Super Gotenks creates ten ghosts that detonate with explosive force when they are touched. He sends all but one at Super Buu, and they reduce him to a deformed puddle of his former self. Super Gotenks sends the final one down Super Buu's mouth and blows him into tiny pieces. Super Gotenks and Piccolo destroy all of the pieces, but the smoke coming from the pieces gathers above their heads and reforms Super Buu. To play up the drama of the situation, Super Gotenks acts like he is out of ideas. Super Buu begins beating up Super Saiyan Gotenks. Thinking that Super Gotenks cannot stop Super Buu, Piccolo destroys the door to the outside world, which appears to trap the three of them in the Hyperbolic Time Chamber for all eternity.
146	6	"The Reserved Transformation of Gotenks! Super Gotenks 3!!" / "Gotenks' Ace in the Hole! Transformation! Super Gotenks 3!"; Transliteration: "Gotenkusu no Totte Oki Henshin! Sūpā Gotenkusu Surī!!" (Japanese: ゴテンクスのとっておき 変身！超ゴテンクス3!!)	260	January 25, 2015	January 20, 2018
Hysterically upset at the prospect of being trapped in the Hyperbolic Time Chamber forever, with nothing to destroy and no candy to eat, Super Buu starts to scream of hate to this place. To everyone's surprise, including his own, his screams become so powerful that they create a hole in the barrier between the dimensions of the Hyperbolic Time Chamber and Earth. Super Buu changes shape in order to fit through it, and the hole closes. This leaves Piccolo and Super Gotenks trapped. Back on Dende's Lookout, Super Buu is hungry and excited at the prospect of turning more people into food. He turns everyone on Dende's lookout into chocolate. Piccolo and Super Gotenks have been attempting to scream loud enough to create an inter-dimensional hole like Super Buu did, but they have no success. Super Gotenks decides to play his trump card and transforms into a Super Saiyan 3 Gotenks. In this state, he has the power necessary to create a hole for him and Piccolo to jump through. Upon their return to Dende's Lookout, they realize that they were too late to stop Super Buu. Super Buu tells Super Gotenks 3 that he ate all of his friends and family. Super Gotenks 3 gets enraged and promises Super Buu that he will pay.
147	7	"In High Spirits! Buu-Buu Volleyball!" / "On a Roll! Buu-Buu-Volleyball!"; Transliteration: "Nori-Nori! Bū-Bū Barēbōru!" (Japanese: ノリノリ！ブウブウバレーボール！)	261–262A	February 1, 2015	January 27, 2018
Super Gotenks 3 and Super Buu begin to fight, and the collateral damage from the battle begins to destroy Dende's Lookout. Super Buu slams Super Gotenks 3 down through Dende's Lookout itself. Down on Earth, Super Gotenks 3 tries another Super Ghost Kamikaze attack, but it once again fails. Super Buu lands a powerful hit on Super Gotenks 3 that sends him flying back onto Dende's Lookout. Super Buu folds himself into a ball and begins repeatedly shooting himself through Dende's Lookout until all that is left is rubble floating in the air. While still in a ball, Super Gotenks 3 is able to trap him in a little sphere. He and Piccolo play some volleyball with Super Buu, and Super Gotenks 3 spikes him down to Earth. Just when it seems like Super Buu is dead, a powerful blast of energy comes from the crater. With Super Buu once again ready to fight, Super Gotenks 3 only has a few minutes left until he separates.
148	8	"You Kept Everyone Waiting! A Reborn Gohan Returns to Earth!!" / "Thanks for Waiting, Everyone! A Reborn Gohan Heads for Earth!"; Transliteration: "O Matase Min'na! Shinsei Gohan, Chikyū e!!" (Japanese: お待たせみんな！新生悟飯、地球へ!!)	262B–263A	February 8, 2015	February 3, 2018
Super Gotenks 3 and Super Buu continue their fight. Gotenks seems to be wearing Super Buu down, and he now has the upper hand in the fight. Just as he is about to hit Super Buu with his final move, Super Gotenks 3 unexpectedly returns straight to his normal state from his Super Saiyan 3 form. The power was too high for him to sustain. Super Buu begins beating up Gotenks, who is now no match for him. Gohan has finally finished his training, and he is ready to return to Earth. After saying goodbye to Goku for what they both believe will be the last time, Kibito takes him back to Earth. Gohan asks Kibito to change his clothes, and Gohan is now wearing the same kind of clothes that Goku has. Gohan arrives just in time, because Gotenks has separated.
149	9	"Buu is Overwhelmed! Ultimate Gohan's Superpower!!" / "Buu Overwhelmed! Ultimate Gohan's Super Power!"; Transliteration: "Bū o Attō! Arutimetto Gohan no Sūpā Pawā!!" (Japanese: ブウを圧倒！究極悟飯の超パワー!!)	263B–264A	February 15, 2015	February 10, 2018
Gohan arrives at the scene, and everyone is shocked to see that he is not dead. They are also in awe of how much power Gohan has now. After Gohan expertly pounds Super Buu to a pulp, Super Buu heals himself and steps up the intensity. However, Gohan still has the upper hand, and he easily picks Super Buu apart. Realizing that he is totally outmatched, Super Buu decides to self-destruct, hoping to take Gohan with him. Gohan escapes before Super Buu explodes, and he takes the others with him out of the blast radius. Afterwards, there is no sign of Super Buu, but Gohan knows that he is still around. They suddenly detect Dende's energy signal, and they go to find him. On the way, they pick up Mr. Satan and the dog named Bee. Dende explains that as Super Buu was escaping through the interdimensional hole, Mr. Popo threw Dende off the lookout, because without him, there would be no Dragon Balls to grant the wishes they intend to use to reverse all the damage. Mr. Satan becomes shocked and horrified to learn that his daughter, Videl is murdered by Super Buu and angrily berates Gohan for not saving her, although Gohan explained that he wasn't actually there when Super Buu killed everybody on the lookout and Goten informs Mr. Satan that they'll bring Videl back to life with the Dragon Balls. Super Buu tracks them down, but he does not want a rematch with Gohan. Instead, he wants to fight Gotenks again. Mr. Satan yells at Super Buu saying that Super Buu has broken Mr. Satan's promise to not kill anybody.
150	10	"Buu's Trick - Gotenks Is Absorbed?!" / "Buu's Sinister Scheme: Gotenks Is Absorbed"; Transliteration: "Bū no Warudakumi Gotenkusu Kyūshū!?" (Japanese: ブウの悪巧み ゴテンクス吸収!?)	264B–265	March 1, 2015	February 17, 2018
Unknown to the others, Super Buu secretly separates two chunks from his back, and the two pink blobs creep around behind the others. As soon as Goten and Trunks fuse, one of the blobs encases Gotenks. Piccolo is covered by the other pink blob. Super Buu calls each of the blobs back to him, which merge with him. This changes his appearance, and he obtains access to all of Piccolo's and Gotenks' memories, abilities, and power. The new and improved Super Buu fights Gohan. Super Buu now has the advantage. Gohan is unable to keep up with Super Buu's new speed and strength. Super Buu taunts Gohan by telling him what his three friends that were absorbed think of him.
151	11	"The Great Kaiōshin's Bright Idea! Son Goku Is Revived!!" / "The Elder Kai's Brainstorm! Return to Life, Goku!"; Transliteration: "Dai Kaiōshin no Myōan! Yomigaere Son Gokū!!" (Japanese: 大界王神の妙案！よみがえれ孫悟空!!)	266–267A	March 15, 2015	February 24, 2018
Gohan is no match for the new Super Buu. Super Buu now possesses new skills such as the Super Ghost Kamikaze Attack and the Special Beam Cannon, which he uses on Gohan. He is about to finish Gohan, when Bee comes running up. Mr. Satan tries to save Bee, but he is only several times stronger than the average human. Super Buu is about to blast each of them when Gohan saves them. Super Buu uses Gotenks' Galactic Doughnut trick on Gohan and aims a Kamehameha at him. Gohan is able to summon enough strength to break free, and he moves out of the way in time. Meanwhile, in Other World, King Yemma decides to send Vegeta back to Earth to help in the fight against Super Buu. On the Sacred World of the Kais, Old Kai decides to give his life to Goku, so he can return to Earth and fight Super Buu. The now deceased Old Kai gives Goku his Potara earrings. Old Kai explains to Goku that if he and another person each wear one on the opposite ears, they will fuse together. Old Kai tells Shin and Kibito to try a fusion with their Potara earrings. This results in them becoming Kaibito. Only now does Kaibito learn that the process is a permanent fusion. Additionally, Old Kai fails to mention at the time that the Potara Fusion will only last for 1 hour for non-Supreme Kais. Dende heals Gohan's injuries. Super Buu creates a giant energy ball and aims it at Dende. Just before it hits, it is deflected by Tien's Tri-Beam attack, who has decided to help. Tien finds out that he is terribly outclassed by Super Buu. Super Buu tries to kill Dende again, but Goku suddenly appears and sends a Destructo Disk at Super Buu, which cuts off his legs and part of his head.
152	12	"One Time Only Miracle... Will the Super Combination With That Guy Come About?" / "Miracles Happen Once... Will Goku and He Make the Ultimate Combination?"; Transliteration: "Kiseki wa Ichido... Naru ka Gokū to Aitsu Chō-Gattai" (Japanese: 奇跡は一度... なるか悟空とアイツの超合体)	267B–268	March 22, 2015	March 3, 2018
Super Buu's separated legs deal Tien a crushing kick, which completely incapacitates him. Afterwards, the legs return to Super Buu. Desperate to stop Super Buu, Goku throws Gohan the other Potara earring, but his aim is off, and he misses. The Potara earring is lost in the rubble. Goku goes Super Saiyan 3 in an attempt to hold off Super Buu, while Gohan searches for the Potara earring. Inside Super Buu, Gotenks' fusion wears off. This causes Super Buu to lose over a third of his power and changes his appearance. Realizing what has happened, Goku declares Gohan can now defeat Super Buu without fusing with himself. Knowing he needs a massive power increase, Super Buu causes the part of his head that was cut off earlier to suddenly engulf Gohan. Super Buu reabsorbs the blob containing Gohan, and he is now even more powerful than he was with Gotenks absorbed. Now back in control of the fight, Super Buu toys with Goku. Super Buu tells Goku he has some time to find someone to fuse with. He considers fusions with Dende and Mr. Satan, but neither of them are appealing possibilities. Goku suddenly senses that Vegeta has returned. He uses Instant Transmission to teleport to his location. While Super Buu is distracted, Dende heals Tien. After Goku finds Vegeta, Goku tries to convince him to fuse. However, Vegeta is angry at Goku because he knows Goku was holding back his Super Saiyan 3 transformation when they fought each other. With Vegeta refusing to cooperate, they are forced to take on Super Buu individually, but they are clearly outclassed. Goku tells Vegeta that Super Buu absorbed Trunks and killed Bulma, which shocks Vegeta. Goku asks Vegeta to put their differences aside to save their families. Vegeta finally agrees, and only when he puts on the Potara earring does Goku mention that the fusion is permanent. The two last surviving Saiyans fuse, and a new being is created.
153	13	"Invincible! Ultimate Warrior Vegito!" / "Invincible! The Ultimate Warrior Vegito"; Transliteration: "Muteki! Kyūkyoku no senshi Bejitto!" (Japanese: 無敵！究極の戦士ベジット！)	269–271A	March 29, 2015	March 10, 2018
The new being names himself Vegito, and he begins to fight Super Buu. He clearly is far superior to even the new Super Buu. In Other World, Bulma, Videl, Chi Chi, and Dabura are looking for Gohan, whom they mostly believe to be dead. When Dabura arrived at the Check-in Station, he resisted the guards' attempts to subdue his aggressive behavior. Knowing Dabura would enjoy being sent to hell, King Yemma sent him to Heaven instead, which turns him good. Back on Earth, Dende and Mr. Satan arrive at the battle scene just as Super Buu has decided to destroy the Earth. Super Buu creates a massive ball of energy and throws it towards the Earth. Vegito easily catches it and deflects it back out into space. Super Buu says that he has yet to fight at his full power. Vegito says the same and powers up to a Super Saiyan. Now calling himself Super Vegito, he continues to thrash Super Buu. Super Buu tries to hide himself with his own steam to gain an advantage, but Super Vegito continues to batter him. On the Grand Kai's planet, Krillin and Yamcha are training with King Kai. Back on Earth, Super Buu is starting to become desperate. He liquefies himself and shoots down Super Vegito's mouth. Super Buu enters Super Vegito's body and turns him into what looks like a super-muscular version of himself. While inside Super Vegito, Super Buu takes control of his body and boasts that he will use his body to destroy him from the inside. Super Vegito uses his energy to isolate all of Super Buu's essence into one spot and pounds him. Super Buu moves around inside Super Vegito's body, but Super Vegito simply continues to pound him. Super Buu is forced to exit Super Vegito's body. Realizing he does not know how he can save himself, Super Buu starts freaking out with the immense amount of energy he releases into his surroundings threatening to rip the universe apart. Realizing this, Super Vegito tries to stop him, but Super Buu has put up a shield around himself. After a long struggle, Super Vegito breaks through the shield and stops Super Buu.
154	14	"The Ace Up Buu's Sleeve! The Warriors are Absorbed!!" / "Buu's Ace in the Hole! The Warriors Are Absorbed!"; Transliteration: "Buu no Oku no Te! Kyūshū Sareta Senshi-tachi!!" (Japanese: ブウの奥の手！吸収された戦士たち!!)	271B–272	April 5, 2015	March 17, 2018
Super Vegito and Super Buu continue to fight, but Super Vegito is still far more powerful than his opponent. He repeatedly dominates Super Buu, which makes Super Buu angrier. Super Vegito is just toying with him. Super Buu hatches a plan and calls Super Vegito out. Super Vegito comes closer, and Super Buu turns him into candy. As Super Buu celebrates his apparent victory, the Super Vegito candy unexpectedly begins to move and attack Super Buu. It turns out that Super Vegito is somehow still in full control of his candy body, and he is just as powerful as he was before. The candy Super Vegito can even still talk. The candy Super Vegito is just as fast as Super Vegito. Due to its tiny size, the candy Super Vegito is impossible for Super Buu to hit. Infuriated at being toyed with by a piece of candy, Super Buu changes the candy Super Vegito back into Super Vegito. Super Vegito continues to beat up Super Buu. Vegito literally starts tearing Super Buu apart. He gives Super Buu until the count of ten until he destroys him. During this countdown, Super Buu notices a part of himself that Super Vegito tore off down on the ground. This part rises up behind Super Vegito. Before Super Vegito reaches ten, he is engulfed by the pink blob. Super Buu calls the pink blob back to him and absorbs it.
155	15	"Rescuing Gohan and Company! Goku and Vegeta's Infiltration Mission!" / "Rescue Gohan and the Others! Goku and Vegeta's Infiltration Mission!"; Transliteration: "Gohan-tachi o Tasukedase! Gokū to Bejīta no Sennyū Misshon!" (Japanese: 悟飯たちを助け出せ！悟空とベジータの潜入作戦(ミッション)！)	273–275A	April 12, 2015	March 24, 2018
After absorbing Super Vegito, Super Buu notices that he has not taken on any of his characteristics and assumed that his opponent had not been digested yet. However, Super Vegito had planned for the turn of events in order to save his family and friends. Super Vegito used an energy barrier to evade being absorbed while shrunk by Super Buu's magic absorption process. Once he dispels the barrier, Super Vegito unexpectedly splits back into Goku and Vegeta, since the 1-hour duration of Potara Fusion between two non-Supreme Kais expired. Vegeta takes advantage of this unexpected event to crush his Potara earring, since he refuses to use the Potara Fusion again. Vegeta also explains to Goku that they will not need Potara Fusion once they weaken Super Buu by releasing his absorbed victims. Goku and Vegeta cut down the cocoons of Gohan, Goten, Trunks, and Piccolo. As the cocoons are cut down, Super Buu regresses to his normal form. Dende and Mr. Satan continue to follow Super Buu. Back inside Super Buu, Goku and Vegeta also find the Fat Buu. They read his thoughts to find out what happened to him. Suddenly, a thought form of Super Buu himself appears, and the two Saiyans find themselves in a losing battle. Eventually, Super Buu finally decides that he has had enough, and he tries to absorb Goku and Vegeta.
156	16	"Emergency Escape from Inside the Body! Buu's Reverse-Transformation Is the Worst!!" / "Emergency Escape from the Body! Buu's Retrogression Into Evil!"; Transliteration: "Tainai Kara Kinkyū Dasshutsu! Bū Saiaku e no Gyaku-Henshin!!" (Japanese: 体内から緊急脱出！ブウ最悪への逆変身!!)	275B–277A	April 19, 2015	March 31, 2018
Goku saves Vegeta from being absorbed. As Vegeta recovers, Goku continues to fight the thought form of Super Buu. Goku is rapidly losing energy. Just as Super Buu is about to defeat Goku, Vegeta cuts down the pod containing the Fat Buu. This causes Super Buu to go mad as he explained that he needed his benign counterpart to maintain his current existence. As Super Buu's insides begin to change, Goku and Vegeta realize they must leave. They grab the pods containing Gohan, Goten, Piccolo, and Trunks and try to find a way out. On their way through his body, they notice one of the tunnels that leads to one of the holes in Super Buu's skin, where the steam escapes. They are able to fly out through here. When they emerge on the other side, all six of them return to their normal size. As Goku and Vegeta set the pods down, they observe Super Buu bulking out before shrinking into a childlike version of himself.
157	17	"Earth Disappears!! The Original Buu's Single Cruel Blast!!" / "Earth Destroyed! The Initial Buu's Nefarious Strike"; Transliteration: "Chikyū Shōmetsu!! Hajimari no Bū no Hidōna Ichigeki!!" (Japanese: 地球消滅!! 始まりのブウの非道な一撃!!)	277B–278A	April 26, 2015	April 7, 2018
When Super Buu regressed to a childlike version of himself after his benign counterpart was completely separated from him, Kaibito reveals to Old Kai that the being is Majin Buu's original form. Kaibito explains how, as East Supreme Kai Shin, he was part of a group of four Supreme Kais, who each oversaw a quadrant of the universe and served under the Grand Supreme Kai Dai Kaio. When Original Majin Buu was created by Bibidi, the original sorcerer and Babidi's father, he was much more powerful and dangerous than his later incarnations, and he led Original Buu to kill the North and West Supreme Kais. Kid Buu absorbed the South Supreme Kai and assumed a Hulking Majin Buu. Hulking Buu later absorbed Dai Kaio, which suppressed Original Buu's focus and destructive impulses. As a result, Hulking Buu became the fat and happy Majin Buu that the group first encountered. Back on Earth, Kid Buu creates a powerful ball of energy and throws it at the Earth intent on destroying it. Goku and Vegeta deflect it. In retaliation, Kid Buu creates a ball of energy ten times more powerful than the previous one, and he throws it at the Earth. Knowing that they currently do not have enough strength left to stop it, Goku and Vegeta try to grab everyone and teleport away. Goku and Vegeta are only able to grab Dende, Mr. Satan, and Bee. As the Earth is about to be destroyed, Kaibito appears and instantly transmits Goku, Vegeta, Dende, Mr. Satan, and Bee to the Sacred World of the Kais. Vegeta angrily berates Goku for his failure to save Gohan, Goten, Trunks, and Piccolo.
158	18	"Final Decisive Battle! A Conclusion in the Realm of the Kais!!" / "A Final Showdown at the Summit! Face-Off in the World of the Kais!"; Transliteration: "Saigo no Chōjō Kessen! Kaiōshin-kai de Ketchaku da!!" (Japanese: 最後の頂上決戦！界王神界で決着だ!!)	278B–279A	May 3, 2015	April 14, 2018
After being blasted apart by Earth's destruction, Kid Buu reforms his body. Kid Buu goes on a rampage throughout the galaxy in search for Goku and Vegeta. He destroys every planet he does not find them on. He goes to the Grand Kai's planet and starts to toy with everyone there. When he becomes bored, he creates an energy ball that is intended to destroy the Grand Kai's planet. After the two Saiyans turn down the offer to use Kaibito's Potara earrings to reform into Vegito, Goku and Vegeta raise their power levels to get Kid Buu's attention. After sensing their energy, Kid Buu abandons his attempt to destroy the Grand Kai's planet. Kid Buu teleports himself to the Sacred World of the Kais. As Kid Buu arrives, Kaibito transports himself, Dende, and Old Kai to a distant planet so they will be out of Goku and Vegeta's way. Kaibito takes the crystal ball that allows them to watch the battle. They forget to take Mr. Satan and Bee along. Goku and Vegeta play rock, paper, scissors to decide who will fight first, and Goku wins. He powers up to Super Saiyan 2 and starts beating up Kid Buu. Goku blasts him apart, but he reforms. Kid Buu creates another massive energy ball and throws it down at the planet. Goku is able to deflect it, but Kid Buu guides the ball back around and into the planet. Powerful shock waves rock the entire planet and disfigures its shape, which leaves the surface ragged and uneven.
159	19	"Do Your Best, Kakarot! You Are No. 1!!" / "Hang In There, Kakarot! You Are No. 1!"; Transliteration: "Ganbare Kakarotto! Omae ga Nanbā Wan da!!" (Japanese: 頑張れカカロット！お前がNo. 1だ!!)	279B–281A	May 10, 2015	April 21, 2018
Goku decides to power up to Super Saiyan 3. Goku and Kid Buu continue to fight, with each of them taking powerful blows from each other. Kid Buu folds himself into a ball again and hits Goku hard. Goku puts all of his energy into a massive Kamehameha and blasts Kid Buu, but Kid Buu simply reforms. Goku returns to his normal state and collapses from exhaustion. Vegeta steps in, but he finds that he is no match for Kid Buu, and Kid Buu beats him up. Just as Kid Buu is about to deal Vegeta the finishing blow, Goku pushes him out of the way. He powers back up to Super Saiyan 3 and continues his furious fight with Kid Buu. Vegeta reminisces about all of the fights he and Goku were in, and Vegeta finally admits to himself that Goku is stronger.
160	20	"A One Minute Battle - Vegeta's Life-Risking Stall Tactics!" / "A One-Minute Match-Up! Vegeta's Life-Threatening Stall for Time!"; Transliteration: "Shōbu wa Ippunkan Bejīta Inochigake no Jikan Kasegi!" (Japanese: 勝負は1分間 ベジータ命懸けの時間稼ぎ！)	281B–282A	May 17, 2015	April 28, 2018
Goku continues to fight Kid Buu, and he seems to have the upper hand. He deals a lot of damage to Kid Buu, but as the fight goes on, his hits become weaker and weaker until they have virtually no effect at all. Goku tells Vegeta that it is his turn, but Vegeta declines and says that he is no match for Kid Buu. Vegeta tells Goku that Kid Buu is too powerful for him and that Goku stands a much better chance of destroying him. Goku is shocked by this admission and tells Vegeta that he deliberately let the fight drag on so that Vegeta could have a turn, and that now he is exhausted. Vegeta is horrified by this, because now they cannot stop Kid Buu. Goku unsuccessfully attempts to reassure Vegeta and tells him that he needs one uninterrupted minute to power up enough to destroy Kid Buu. Despite the fact that Vegeta recognizes that he will need a miracle to survive a minute against Kid Buu now, he reluctantly steps in, while Goku is powering up as a Super Saiyan 3, even though Goku tells him that if he is destroyed when he is already dead, Vegeta will no longer exist in any form. Kid Buu thrashes Vegeta, but every time he gets knocked down, Vegeta gets up, ready for more. Kid Buu stretches out his arm, wraps it around Vegeta's neck, and begins choking him for fun. More than one minute has passed, but Goku still has not gathered the power he needs.
161	21	"A Secret Plan Comes Together in a Flash - Please Grant These Two Wishes!" / "An Inspired Strategy Make Two Wishes Come True!"; Transliteration: "Hirameita Hisaku Futatsu no Negai o Kanaetamae!" (Japanese: 閃いた秘策 2つの願いを叶えたまえ！)	282B–283A	May 24, 2015	May 5, 2018
Instead of gathering more power, Goku's power is completely drained by the Super Saiyan 3 transformation, and he reverts into his base state. Fat Buu enters the fight and saves Vegeta from death. However, he is no match for Kid Buu, who begins to severely beat him. Mr. Satan tries to help Fat Buu, but his help is ineffective. Vegeta suddenly comes up with a plan. He communicates with Dende and tells him to go to New Namek to gather the Namekian Dragon Balls. The Supreme Kai and Old Kai take Dende there, and the Namekians are waiting with the seven Namekian Dragon Balls. Porunga is summoned, and Vegeta tells Dende his two wishes: bring back the Earth and restore it to its undamaged state, and bring back all of the non-evil people that died since the morning of the World Martial Arts Tournament. These two wishes are granted. Vegeta comes back to life, which proves that he is no longer evil. He finally reveals the main part of his plan to destroy Kid Buu, which is for Goku to use the Spirit Bomb.
162	22	"Give Me Energy! We'll Make a Huge Spirit Bomb!!" / "Share Your Spirit Energy with Me! I'm Making a Huge Spirit Bomb!"; Transliteration: "Ora ni Genki o Waketekure! Tsukuru ze Dekkai Genki-Dama!!" (Japanese: オラに元気を分けてくれ！作るぜでっかい元気玉!!)	283B–284	May 31, 2015	May 12, 2018
The people of Earth come back to life, and Goku gets into position to create the Spirit Bomb. With the help of King Kai, Vegeta speaks to the entire population of Earth. Vegeta tells the people of Earth what is going on, and that in order to defeat Kid Buu, they need to raise their hands up and offer their energy. Only Goku and Vegeta's family and friends comply because no one else is willing to listen to a "mysterious voice" from the sky. Vegeta repeatedly pleads with the Earthlings, but to no avail. While this is going on, Fat Majin Buu is buying them time by fighting Kid Buu, but it is not going well. Meanwhile, Goku still has not gathered nearly enough energy required to destroy Kid Buu.
163	23	"The Savior of the World Is You! Everyone's Spirit Bomb Is Completed!!" / "You Are the Savior of the World! Everybody's Spirit Bomb Completed!"; Transliteration: "Sekai no Kyūseishu wa Omaeda! Min'na no Genki-Dama Kansei!!" (Japanese: 世界の救世主はおまえだ！みんなの元気玉完成!!)	285–286A	June 7, 2015	May 19, 2018
Vegeta continues to plead with the people of Earth, but no one will listen to him. Fat Buu has finally lost all of his energy, so Vegeta is forced to fight Kid Buu again. He is no match for him and gets severely beaten. This time, Goku asks the Earthlings to raise their arms up and donate some of their energy, and small pockets of people who recognize his voice or just like the sound of it do so, but the vast majority remain unconvinced. Piccolo, Gohan, Goten, and Trunks spread out into the city to convince people to raise their arms up and donate their energy. Mr. Satan has finally had enough, and he speaks to the people of Earth. When they hear the familiar voice of the "World Champion," all of the people of Earth raise their arms up and offer their energy. The Spirit Bomb turns into a Super Spirit Bomb and is finally ready. Goku is ready to throw the Super Spirit Bomb at Kid Buu, but Vegeta is in the way. Despite Vegeta's pleas, Goku refuses to take out Vegeta with Kid Buu. Suddenly, Fat Buu gets up and holds Kid Buu down long enough for Mr. Satan to pull Vegeta to safety. Kid Buu kicks Fat Buu aside and Goku throws the Super Spirit Bomb.
164	24	"Son Goku Is the Strongest After All!! Majin Buu Is Annihilated" / "You Really Are the Greatest, Goku!! The Demise of Majin Buu"; Transliteration: "Yappari Saikyō Son Gokū!! Majin Bū Shōmetsu" (Japanese: やっぱり最強孫悟空!! 魔人ブウ消滅)	286B–287A	June 14, 2015	June 2, 2018
The Super Spirit Bomb hits Kid Buu, but he starts pushing it back. Goku uses all of the remaining energy he has left trying to push it back at Kid Buu, but he is too powerful. After a brief moment of panic, Vegeta suddenly remembers that they still have a third wish with Porunga. He instructs Dende to wish for Goku's power level to be restored to normal. The wish is granted, and upon turning into a Super Saiyan, Goku is easily able to force the Super Spirit Bomb back at Kid Buu. As he does so, he silently wishes that Kid Buu had been a better person and hopes to fight him as a different person some day in the future. The Super Spirit Bomb hits with full force and destroys Kid Buu for good, which ends his evil.
165	25	"Peace Returns! A Time of Rest for the Warriors!"	287B–288	—	June 9, 2018
Bulma has invited everyone to a party at Capsule Corporation. Goku's family is ready to leave for the party. The only problem is that Goku is nowhere to be found. A frustrated Chi-Chi, Gohan, and Goten leave without him. While everyone's having a good time at the party, Goku is out on a mountaintop. He is looking after some eggs that are ready to hatch; Goku protects the eggs from the storm and predators. After the eggs hatch, he finally arrives at the party, which delights everyone.
166	26	"And So, After 10 Years... The First World Martial Arts Tournament in a Long Time!" / "And So, Ten Years Later... A Long-Awaited World Martial Arts Tournament!"; Transliteration: "Soshite Jūnengo... Hisashiburi no Tenka'ichi Budōkai!" (Japanese: そして10年後...久しぶりの天下一武道会！)	289–290A	June 21, 2015	June 16, 2018
Ten years have passed, and much has changed. Gohan has become a scholar, and Trunks and Goten are in their late teens. Goku is training with Goten when Bulma and Vegeta, who have a daughter, Bulla, show up after not seeing him in five years. Goku says that he and Goten will be entering the World Martial Arts Tournament. Vegeta says that he and Trunks will do the same. The day of the tournament comes, and old friends catch up. Everyone has arrived to watch. Gohan, who is now married to Videl, has decided not to enter, but his daughter, Pan, will fight. Since there is no junior division this time, she will be fighting with the adults. Mr. Satan and Fat Buu will also be fighting. However, Goku says that there is someone who is 100% human who could beat him and Vegeta. The seeding draw for the tournament begins. Goku asks Fat Buu to use his magic to rig it so that he faces the powerful mystery fighter he had talked about.
167	27	"Even Stronger! Goku's Dream Never Ends!!" / "Even Stronger! Goku's Dream Is Never-Ending!"; Transliteration: "Motto Tsuyoku! Gokū no Yume wa Owaranai!!" (Japanese: もっと強く！悟空の夢は終わらない!!)	290B–291	June 28, 2015	June 23, 2018
In the first match, five-year-old Pan fights Mo Kekko. Pan easily defeats Mo Kekko. In the second match, Goku fights a ten-year-old boy named Uub, who is the reincarnation of Kid Buu. King Yemma apparently heard Goku's wish right before Kid Buu was destroyed. King Yemma reincarnated Kid Buu as a good person named Uub. However, Uub is apprehensive. To bait Uub into fighting, Goku eventually resorts to taunting him. After a particularly nasty insult and a kick to the face, Uub snaps, and he is now ready to fight. Goku and Uub begin to fight, and it is clear that Uub does not know much about fighting. As the match goes on, he grows more and more accustomed to his hidden power. Uub's hidden power is finally released, as he is able to go toe-to-toe with Goku in his base state. When Goku does power up slightly, Uub nearly falls off the tournament stage, but Goku saves him from hitting the ground, with Goku realizing that Uub does not even know how to fly. Goku decides to train Uub. Despite his friends and family pleading with Goku to stay, he flies away with Uub on his back. Goku wants to train Uub to defend the Earth when he is gone, with Goku hoping to have a real all-out match with Uub to test their full power, once Uub's training is complete. Goku and Uub fly off into the distance, with whoops of joy.

== Home media releases ==
=== Japanese ===
==== DVD ====
Volume	Date	Discs	Aspect ratio	Episodes
1	September 18, 2009	1	16:9	1–3
2	October 23, 2009	1	16:9	4–6
3	November 20, 2009	1	16:9	7–9
4	December 18, 2009	1	16:9	10–12
5	January 29, 2010	1	16:9	13–15
6	February 19, 2010	1	16:9	16–18
7	March 19, 2010	1	16:9	19–21
8	March 19, 2010	1	16:9	22–24
9	April 23, 2010	1	16:9	25–27
10	April 23, 2010	1	16:9	28–30
11	May 28, 2010	1	16:9	31–33
12	May 28, 2010	1	16:9	34–36
13	June 25, 2010	1	16:9	37–39
14	June 25, 2010	1	16:9	40–42
15	July 23, 2010	1	16:9	43–45
16	July 23, 2010	1	16:9	46–48
17	August 27, 2010	1	16:9	49–51
18	August 27, 2010	1	16:9	52–54
Androids and Cell 1	October 2, 2010	1	16:9	55–57
Androids and Cell 2	November 4, 2010	1	16:9	58–60
Androids and Cell 3	December 3, 2010	1	16:9	61–63
Androids and Cell 4	January 7, 2011	1	16:9	64–66
Androids and Cell 5	February 4, 2011	1	16:9	67–69
Androids and Cell 6	March 4, 2011	1	16:9	70–72
Androids and Cell 7	May 3, 2011	1	16:9	73–75
Androids and Cell 8	May 3, 2011	1	16:9	76–78
Androids and Cell 9	May 3, 2011	1	16:9	79–81
Androids and Cell 10	May 3, 2011	1	16:9	82–84
Androids and Cell 11	June 2, 2011	1	16:9	85–87
Androids and Cell 12	June 2, 2011	1	16:9	88–90
Androids and Cell 13	July 2, 2011	1	16:9	91–93
Androids and Cell 14	July 2, 2011	1	16:9	94–96
Androids and Cell 15	August 2, 2011	1	16:9	97–98
Majin Buu Box 1	September 2, 2014	2	16:9	99–110
Majin Buu Box 2	December 2, 2014	2	16:9	111–122
Majin Buu Box 3	March 3, 2015	2	16:9	123–134
Majin Buu Box 4	June 2, 2015	2	16:9	135–146
Majin Buu Box 5	September 2, 2015	2	16:9	147–159
Vegeta and Frieza	December 2, 2014	18	16:9	1–54
Androids and Cell	January 6, 2015	16	16:9	55–98

==== Blu-ray ====
Volume	Date	Discs	Aspect ratio	Episodes
1	September 18, 2009	1	4:3	1–3
Box 1	October 23, 2009	4	4:3	4–15
Box 2	February 19, 2010	4	4:3	16–27
Box 3	April 23, 2010	4	4:3	28–39
Box 4	June 25, 2010	5	4:3	40–54
Androids and Cell Box 1	October 2, 2010	4	4:3	55–65
Androids and Cell Box 2	February 4, 2011	4	4:3	66–76
Androids and Cell Box 3	June 2, 2011	4	4:3	77–87
Androids and Cell Box 4	August 2, 2011	4	4:3	88–98
Majin Buu Box 1	September 2, 2014	2	16:9	99–110
Majin Buu Box 2	December 2, 2014	2	16:9	111–122
Majin Buu Box 3	March 3, 2015	2	16:9	123–134
Majin Buu Box 4	June 2, 2015	2	16:9	135–146
Majin Buu Box 5	September 2, 2015	2	16:9	147–159
Vegeta and Frieza	December 2, 2014	18	4:3	1–54
Androids and Cell	January 6, 2015	16	4:3	55–98

=== English ===
==== Volumes ====
Name	Date			Discs		Aspect ratio	Episodes
Name	USA	AU	UK	Blu-ray	DVD	Aspect ratio	Episodes
Part One	May 18, 2010		—N/a	2	2	4:3	1–13
Part Two	September 14, 2010		—N/a	2	2	4:3	14–26
Part Three	December 14, 2010		—N/a	2	2	4:3	27–39
Part Four	March 8, 2011		—N/a	2	2	4:3	40–52
Part Five	June 28, 2011		—N/a	2	2	4:3	53–65
Part Six	September 13, 2011		—N/a	2	2	4:3	66–77
Part Seven	March 20, 2012		—N/a	2	2	4:3	78–88
Part Eight	June 5, 2012		—N/a	2	2	4:3	89–98
The Final Chapters - Part One	April 25, 2017	June 7, 2017	October 22, 2018	3	4	16:9	99–121
The Final Chapters - Part Two	May 23, 2017	August 16, 2017	November 12, 2018	3	4	16:9	122–144
The Final Chapters - Part Three	June 20, 2017	September 6, 2017	December 10, 2018	3	4	16:9	145–167

==== Seasons ====
Name	Date		Discs	Aspect ratio	Episodes
Name	USA	UK	Discs	Aspect ratio	Episodes
Season One	October 18, 2011 (original); May 22, 2012 (re-release)	August 3, 2015	4	4:3	1–26
Season Two	May 22, 2012	September 28, 2015	4	4:3	27–52
Season Three	September 11, 2012	November 9, 2015	4	4:3	53–77
Season Four	March 12, 2013	December 28, 2015	4	4:3	78–98

==== Complete Series ====
Name	Date (AU)	Discs	Episodes
The Final Chapters Complete Series	June 6, 2018	12	99–167
The Complete Epic	October 7, 2020	25	1–167
