= Jason Douglas =

American actor

- Douglas at GalaxyCon San Jose 2026
- Born: February 14, 1973 (age 53); Arkansas, USA
- Occupation: Actor
- Years active: 1995-present
- Notable credits: The Walking Dead as Tobin; Breaking Bad as Det. Munn; Psycho-Pass as Tomomi Masaoka, Dragon Ball Super as Beerus; Borderlands (video games) as Krieg the Psycho; Chainsaw Man as Kishibe

Jason Douglas (born February 14, 1973) is an American film, television and voice actor, known for portraying Tobin on AMC's The Walking Dead, voicing Beerus in the anime film Dragon Ball Z: Battle of Gods and the series Dragon Ball Super, Tomomi Masaoka in Psycho-Pass, Krieg in the video game Borderlands 2 and its sequel, Borderlands 3.

Douglas is noted for his appearances in films, including Sin City, Parkland, Two Step, and No Country for Old Men as well as recurring and guest appearances on hit TV shows such as Breaking Bad, The Leftovers, Nashville, The Night Shift, Preacher, and Cruel Summer.

In addition to the role of Beerus in the Dragon Ball franchise, his voice acting career includes leading roles in Chainsaw Man, My Hero Academia, RWBY, Attack on Titan, One Piece, Fairy Tail, Psycho-Pass, and Parasyte.

== Filmography ==
=== Live-action ===
==== Film ====
| Year | Title | Role | Notes |
|---|---|---|---|
| 2003 | Secondhand Lions | Helper | |
| 2005 | Sin City | Stan | |
| 2006 | A Scanner Darkly | New Path Farm Manager | |
| 2007 | Premonition | E.R. Doctor | |
| 2007 | No Country for Old Men | Cabbie at Motel | |
| 2007 | Planet Terror | Lewis | |
| 2008 | The Librarian: Curse of the Judas Chalice | Ivan | |
| 2010 | Machete | Patrolman #1 | |
| 2014 | Two Step | Duane | |
| 2016 | Jack Reacher: Never Go Back | Sheriff Raymond Wood | |
| 2026 | BIOHAZARD | Jack Baker | Short film |

==== Television ====
| Year | Title | Role | Notes |
|---|---|---|---|
| 2005 | Into the West | Tom Cooper | Episode: "Ghost Dance" |
| 2006 | Thief | Officer Charles | Episode: "I Ain't Goin' to Jail |
| 2006 | The Lost Room | Anthony | 3 episodes |
| 2006 | Prison Break | Patrolman | Episode: Scan (S2:E3) |
| 2007 | Friday Night Lights | Buck | Episode: "I Think We Should Have Sex" |
| 2010 | The Good Guys | Lucas O'Neill | Episode: "$3.52" |
| 2010 | Chase | Norwood Hayes | Episode: "Havoc" |
| 2011, 2013 | Breaking Bad | Detective Munn | 3 episodes |
| 2013 | Revolution | Garrett | 5 episodes |
| 2013–2015 | Nashville | Dashell Brinks | 7 episodes |
| 2014 | Star-Crossed | Nox | 2 episodes |
| 2015 | The Night Shift | Mr. Harrison | Episode: "Eyes Look Your Last" |
| 2015–2018 | The Walking Dead | Tobin | 25 episodes |
| 2017 | The Leftovers | Jed | Episode: "The Book of Kevin" |
| 2018 | Preacher | Satan | 4 episodes |
| 2021 | Cruel Summer | Nick Marshall | 4 episodes |

=== Voice acting ===
==== Anime ====
- A.D. Police: To Protect and Serve – Officer Hans Klief
- After the Rain – Masami Kondo
- Air Gear – Magaki, Yoshitsune
- Area 88 – Satoru Kanzaki
- Attack on Titan – Miche Zacharius
- Attack on Titan: Junior High – Miche Zacharius
- Ameku M.D.: Doctor Detective – Ōwashi Ameku
- Azumanga Daioh – Chiyo's Father
- Baki – Yujiro Hanma (Sentai Studios Dub)
- BECK: Mongolian Chop Squad – Rikya
- Black Butler – Claude Faustus
- Blade of the Phantom Master – Munsu
- Bubblegum Crisis Tokyo 2040 – Leon McNichol
- Cardcaptor Sakura: Clear Card – Fujitaka Kinomoto
- Casshern Sins – Dune
- Cat Planet Cuties – Matrey
- Chainsaw Man – Kishibe
- Chrome Shelled Regios – Fellmouse
- Chrono Crusade – Father Ewan Remington
- Cromartie High School – Takeshi Hokuto
- D.Gray-man – Yang (Ep. 51)
- Danganronpa: The Animation – Daiya Owada
- Darker than Black: Gemini of the Meteor – Goro Kobayashi
- Dead Mount Death Play – Iwanome
- Deadman Wonderland – Azuma Genkaku
- Devil Survivor 2: The Animation – Ronaldo Kuriki
- Dirty Pair Affair of Nolandia – Gooley
- Dirty Pair Flash – Touma
- Divergence Eve – Jean Luc LeBlanc
- Dragon Ball Super – Beerus
- Dragon Ball Z Kai – King Cold, South Kai
- Dr. Stone – Village Chief Kokuyo
- Elfen Lied – Bandoh
- Excel Saga – Il Palazzo
- Fairy Tail – Gildarts Clive
- Fairy Tail: 100 Years Quest – Gildarts Clive
- Frieren – Heiter
- Full Metal Panic: The Second Raid – Vincent Bruno
- Fullmetal Alchemist: Brotherhood – Major Miles
- Future Diary – Takao Hiyama (3rd)
- Gantz – Tetsuo
- Gasaraki – Kiyotsugu Gowa
- Gate (novel series) – Emperor Molt Augustus
- Generator Gawl – Kanae
- Ghost in the Shell: Arise – Paz
- Gnosia – Jonas
- Gravion – Klein Sandman
- Guyver: The Bioboosted Armor – Oswald Lisker / Guyver II
- Grimoire of Zero - Mercenary
- Hero Tales – Chinjo (Ep. 4)
- Hetalia World Series – Germania
- Himouto! Umaru-chan - Takeshi Motoba
- Initial D – Seiji Iwaki (Funimation Dub)
- Innocent Venus – Buichi Nakahira
- Jinki: Extend – Ryouhei Ogawara
- Kaiju No. 8 – Keiji Itami
- Kaleido Star – Chikara Naegino
- Kenichi: The Mightiest Disciple – Isshinsai Ogata (Sage Fist)
- Kiba – Garl
- Kimagure Orange Road: Summer's Beginning – Kyosuke Kasuga
- Kurau: Phantom Memory – Doug
- Le Chevalier D'Eon – Duke of Orleans
- Level E – Kraft
- Maburaho – Haruaki Akai
- Magical Shopping Arcade Abenobashi – Ms. Aki
- Mezzo DSA – Tomohisa Harada
- Moon Phase – Yayoi Mido
- Made in Abyss – Gueira
- My Hero Academia – Fourth Kind
- Mythical Detective Loki Ragnarok – Frey
- Okami-san and her Seven Companions – Takashi Tonda (Eps. 8, 11)
- One Piece – Aokiji
- Orphen – Childman
- Panty & Stocking with Garterbelt – Brief's Father (Ep. 12b)
- Papuwa – Liquid
- Parasyte – Gotou
- Peacemaker Kurogane – Sanosuke Harada
- Prétear – Kaoru Awayuki
- Psycho-Pass – Tomomi Masaoka
- Rahxephon – Masaru Gomi
- Red Data Girl – Shingo Nonomura
- Rideback – Romanov Karenbach
- Rosario + Vampire – Kuyo
- RWBY: Ice Queendom - Jacques Schnee
- Rune Soldier – Louie
- Saint Seiya – Cygnus Hyoga
- Saiyuki – Homura
- Samurai Warriors - Ujiyasu Hojo
- Shadow Skill - Ragu
- Shakugan no Shana – Sydonay (seasons 2–3)
- Shangri-La – Reon Imaki
- Sorcerer Hunters – Marron Glace
- Soul Eater – Joe Buttataki
- Space Dandy – Idea (Ep. 11)
- Street Fighter II V – Ken (ADV dub)
- Super GALS! – Tatsuki Kuroi
- The Ancient Magus' Bride – Uncle Nevin (Elder Dragon)
- The Case Study of Vanitas – August Ruthven
- The Dawn of the Witch - Mercenary
- The Saga of Tanya the Evil – Hans Von Zettour (Season 2)
- That Time I Got Reincarnated as a Slime - Middray
- The Legend of the Legendary Heroes – Lieral Lieutolu
- To Be Hero X – Old E-Soul
- Tojima Wants to Be a Kamen Rider – Nakao
- Tokyo Majin – Raito Umon
- Toriko – Match
- Trinity Blood – William Walter Wordsworth
- Utawarerumono – Kurou
- Vinland Saga – Thors
- Wandaba Style – Michael Hanagata
- Xenosaga: The Animation – Ziggy
- Yakuza Fiancé: Raise wa Tanin ga Ii – Azuna
- Yugo the Negotiator – Yugo Beppu

==== Animation ====
- RWBY – Jacques Schnee

==== Film ====
- Appleseed – Edward Uranus III (Sentai dub)
- Dragon Ball Super: Broly – Beerus, King Cold
- Dragon Ball Super: Super Hero – Beerus
- Dragon Ball Z: Battle of Gods – Beerus
- Dragon Ball Z: Resurrection 'F' – Beerus
- Fullmetal Alchemist the Movie: Conqueror of Shamballa – Rudolf Hess
- Justice League x RWBY: Super Heroes & Huntsmen, Part One - Jacques Schnee
- Mass Effect: Paragon Lost – Archuk
- One Piece: Film Z – Aokiji
- Short Peace – Man (Possessions)
- Tales of Vesperia: The First Strike – Alexei
- Vexille – Saito

==== Video games ====
- Aliens: Colonial Marines – Cruz
- Borderlands 2 – Psycho, Krieg
- Borderlands 3 – Krieg — Cameo and Psycho Krieg and the Fantastic Fustercluck DLC Campaign 4
- Deus Ex: Invisible War – Sid Black
- Dragon Ball FighterZ – Beerus
- Dragon Ball Legends – Beerus
- Dragon Ball: Sparking! Zero – Beerus
- Dragon Ball Xenoverse – Beerus
- Dragon Ball Xenoverse 2 – Beerus
- Dragon Ball Z: Battle of Z – Beerus
- Dragon Ball Z: Kakarot - King Cold, Beerus
- Dragon Ball Z: Ultimate Tenkaichi – Hero (Silent)
- Duke Nukem Forever – Generic Male Voices
- Mobile Suit Gundam: Battle Operation 2 - Neidhardt Heidegger
- Prominence – ren Keterek
- Smite – Ares, Dark Whisperer Ah Muzen Cab
- Unlimited Saga – Nuage / Dagle Bos

== Awards and nominations ==
| Year | Award | Category | Work | Result |
|---|---|---|---|---|
| 2014 | BTVA Anime Dub Awards | Voice Actor of the Year | Various | Nominated |
| 2015 | BTVA Anime Dub Awards | Best Male Supporting Vocal Performance in an Anime Movie/Special | Dragon Ball Z: Resurrection 'F' | Nominated |
