= Dragon Ball Z: Battle of Gods =

2013 Japanese animated film

- Theatrical release poster
- Directed by: Masahiro Hosoda
- Screenplay by: Yusuke Watanabe
- Story by: Akira Toriyama
- Based on: Dragon Ball by Akira Toriyama
- Produced by: Rioko Tominaga; Gyarmath Bogdan
- Starring: see below
- Edited by: Shinichi Fukumitsu
- Music by: Norihito Sumitomo
- Production company: Toei Animation
- Distributed by: Toei Company, Ltd.; 20th Century Fox Japan
- Release date: March 30, 2013 (Japan)
- Running time: 85 minutes (theatrical); 105 minutes (special edition)
- Country: Japan
- Language: Japanese
- Box office: $50.5 million

Dragon Ball Z: Battle of Gods (Japanese: ドラゴンボールZ 神と神, Hepburn: Doragon Bōru Zetto Kami to Kami; lit. "Dragon Ball Z: God and God") is a 2013 Japanese animated science fantasy martial arts film. It is the eighteenth animated feature film based on the 1984–95 manga series Dragon Ball, the fourteenth to carry the Dragon Ball Z branding, and is the first film in the franchise to be personally supervised by series creator Akira Toriyama. It was the first animated Dragon Ball film in 17 years to have a theatrical release, the last being Dragon Ball: The Path to Power (1996), and the first to use digital ink and paint. Unlike previous theatrical Dragon Ball releases, this was a full feature-length production with a stand-alone release and not shown as part of the now-discontinued Toei Anime Fair (formerly the Toei Manga Matsuri). At the time of its release, Battle of Gods was initially the first film considered an official part of the Dragon Ball storyline, being set during the time skip in chapter 517 of the original manga. The plot involves Beerus, the God of Destruction, learning of the defeat of the galactic overlord Frieza at the hands of Goku. Seeking an opponent worthy of his power, Beerus, along with his companion Whis, travels to the North Galaxy to challenge Goku to a battle.

The film was released in Japan on March 30, 2013, by Toei and 20th Century Fox Japan. It was the first-ever Japanese film to be screened at IMAX, and was released on DVD and Blu-ray on September 13, 2013. Funimation acquired the North American rights to Battle of Gods and produced an English dub that they co-released with 20th Century Fox in North American cinemas in August 2014. Madman Entertainment acquired the Australasian rights and screened the film at the 2013 Japanese Film Festival in Australia before screening the English dub to select theaters in August 2014. Manga Entertainment released the film in the United Kingdom in November 2014.

A sequel, Dragon Ball Z: Resurrection 'F', was released in Japan in April 2015, while both films would eventually be adapted into the first and second story arcs of Dragon Ball Super, which expanded upon the plot of both films.

== Plot ==
Beerus, the God of Destruction, is woken from a lengthy slumber by his attendant Whis. While reviewing the current state of the universe, he is surprised to learn that Frieza was defeated by a Saiyan raised on Earth named Goku. (Note: As depicted in the Frieza arc in Dragon Ball Z) He recalls that thirty-nine years prior, the Oracle Fish foretold that a mighty opponent would appear before Beerus called the Super Saiyan God. Intrigued by the potential challenge, Beerus then tracks Goku to King Kai's planet. Goku excitedly challenges Beerus to a fight and despite powering up to Super Saiyan 3 form, is effortlessly defeated. Disappointed, Beerus departs in order to seek out the other Saiyans.

On Earth, Bulma's birthday party is interrupted by Beerus' arrival. Vegeta, aware of the might of the god of destruction, casts his pride aside in order to appease him, who along with Whis, soon both develop a curiosity for Earth's cuisine. While the party is ongoing, the Pilaf Gang attempts (and fails) to infiltrate the party to steal the magical Dragon Balls, and accidentally shoots Videl while making a scene. While Dende is healing her, he learns that Videl is pregnant with Gohan's child. As the celebration continues, Beerus is soon provoked by Buu who refuses to share any pudding.

Beerus attacks Buu and decides to destroy the Earth when Android 18, Tien Shinhan, Piccolo, and Gohan attempt to fight Beerus but are all swiftly defeated. Vegeta reluctantly tries his hand at fighting Beerus as does Goten and Trunks, who fuse into Gotenks, but they both are beaten as well. Bulma becomes upset at the fighting ruining her party and scolds Beerus before slapping him. When Beerus hits her back, Vegeta is sent into fit of rage and power ups to Super Saiyan 2 form, despite faring the best in combat against Beerus of anyone thus far, is still defeated. As Beerus prepares to obliterate the planet, Goku arrives and asks Beerus for more time to learn about the Super Saiyan God.

Using the Dragon Balls, he summons Shenron and the eternal dragon reveals that they need the power of six pure-hearted Saiyans for one of them to reach the form. Thanks to the power of himself, Vegeta, Gohan, Trunks, Goten, and Videl's unborn child channeling their energy together, Goku ascends to the level of Super Saiyan God. He confronts Beerus and they engage in an intense battle. The form gives Goku the power to resist Beerus, but he reverts to his regular Super Saiyan form due to its apparent time limit. However, he acquires the form's godlike feeling which allows him to retain some of the power in his fight against Beerus who eventually decides to use a massive energy attack to truly put Goku to the test.

Goku struggles to stop the energy sphere but after he laments on the potential deaths of his loved ones, he is able to absorb the attack and briefly transform into a Super Saiyan God once again. However, Goku is overwhelmed with exhaustion, and at Beerus' suggestion, finally admits defeat. He recognizes Goku's effort and reveals that he was the second strongest person he had ever fought, after Whis, who is also his martial arts master and is even stronger than he is. Goku also learns that there are other universes with other Gods of Destruction as well. Beerus decides to spare the Earth by only destroying a small rock (thus technically keeping his word), and he and Whis bid farewell as they depart back to their home world.

== Voice cast ==
| Character | Japanese voice actor | English voice actor |
|---|---|---|
| Goku | Masako Nozawa | Sean Schemmel |
| Beerus | Kōichi Yamadera | Jason Douglas |
| Whis | Masakazu Morita | Ian Sinclair |
| Vegeta | Ryō Horikawa | Christopher R. Sabat |
| Bulma | Hiromi Tsuru | Monica Rial |
| Kaiō | Jōji Yanami | King Kai |
| Kaiō | Jōji Yanami | Sean Schemmel |
| Pilaf | Shigeru Chiba | Chuck Huber |
| Mai | Eiko Yamada | Colleen Clinkenbeard |
| Gohan | Masako Nozawa | Kyle Hebert |
| Trunks | Takeshi Kusao | Laura Bailey |
| Shenron | Kenji Utsumi | Christopher R. Sabat |
| Shu | Tesshō Genda | Chris Cason |
| Piccolo | Toshio Furukawa | Christopher R. Sabat |
| Master Roshi | Masaharu Satō | Mike McFarland |
| Kuririn | Mayumi Tanaka | Krillin |
| Kuririn | Mayumi Tanaka | Sonny Strait |
| Videl | Yūko Minaguchi | Kara Edwards |
| Chi-Chi | Naoko Watanabe | Cynthia Cranz |
| Goten | Masako Nozawa | Kara Edwards |
| Oolong | Naoki Tatsuta | Brad Jackson |
| Dende | Aya Hirano | Justin Cook |
| Mr. Satan | Unshō Ishizuka | Chris Rager |
| Majin Buu | Kōzō Shioya | Josh Martin |
| Gotenks | Masako Nozawa; Takeshi Kusao | Kara Edwards; Laura Bailey |
| Dr. Brief | Jōji Yanami | Dr. Briefs |
| Dr. Brief | Jōji Yanami | Mark Stoddard |
| Yamcha | Tōru Furuya | Christopher R. Sabat |
| Tenshinhan | Hikaru Midorikawa | Tien Shinhan |
| Tenshinhan | Hikaru Midorikawa | John Burgmeier |
| Ox-King | Ryūzaburō Ōtomo | Kyle Hebert |
| Bulma's mother | Yōko Kawanami | Mrs. Briefs |
| Bulma's mother | Yōko Kawanami | Cynthia Cranz |
| Android 18 | Miki Itō | Meredith McCoy |
| Pu-erh | Naoko Watanabe | Puar |
| Pu-erh | Naoko Watanabe | Brina Palencia |
| Seer | Shoko Nakagawa | Monica Rial |
| Sushi Chef | Shinichi Karube | T. Axelrod |
| Police woman | Kaori Matsumoto | Mary Elizabeth McGlynn |
| Narrator | Jōji Yanami | Kyle Hebert |

== Development and production ==
Early in July 2012, Weekly Shōnen Jump's official website had already opened a teaser page with a countdown to a "surprise" on Saturday, July 14, the release date of its 33rd issue of the year. On July 14, the magazine and website, now changed to show Shenlong appearing and then disappearing, revealed some minor information of the upcoming film; including the premiere date, staff information, and companies involved in the production (Fox International Productions Japan, Shueisha, Fuji TV, Toei Animation, Bandai, Bandai Namco Games, and Bird Studio). The film's director is Masahiro Hosoda, who directed several Dragon Ball Z episodes back in 1992, the screenplay was written by Yūsuke Watanabe, who has written manga adaptations before (namely the 20th Century Boys and Gantz live-action films), and the lead animation director is Tadayoshi Yamamuro, who has worked on the series since the Dragon Ball anime.

The magazine and official website also published a comment by Akira Toriyama about the film. The Dragon Ball series creator notes that the adaptation will mark the first time he has been so deeply involved in the production of one of its films, in this case as early as the screenwriting stages. Toriyama also said that the film will retain the atmosphere of the original while adding small amounts of modern flavor. Toei Animation released a press statement on July 17, 2012, saying it would be set "between the animation series Z and GT, or in other words from the blank decade between the end of the battle with Majin Buu in chapter 517 of the manga and chapter 518" and calling it part of "the official history of Dragon Ball."

In September, it was announced that the film was one of four that year, and the only animated one, to receive money from the Japanese government as part of the non-profit organization UNIJAPAN's "Co-production Certification Program". Toei received 50 million yen (roughly US$636,000) from the Agency for Cultural Affairs, whose aim is to promote Japanese arts and culture, with the United States named as the film's partner country.

This time in particular, we had a request from sensei to leave in not only the action, but also some truly enjoyable... the truly enjoyable aspects of Dragon Ball; Dragon Ball's chaotic feeling, and the action of Gohan's battles and of the Z Fighters are mixed together very well, so I believe that has also helped make it an enjoyable movie.

— Gyarmath Bogdan, MAG Net, NHK, March 1, 2013

The December issue of Ultra Jump elaborated on Toriyama's involvement in the film, stating he came up with the film's story and character designs. On December 2, the official website was updated with the films' cast and entire staff. The following day, a brief introduction to the film's story was leaked from accessing an unlinked section of the website.

In January 2013, it was announced that Olympic gold medalist in judo Kaori Matsumoto and singer/tarento Shoko Nakagawa will have roles in the film. Nakagawa is a well-known otaku and Matsumoto is a fan of the series as well. Matsumoto voices a policewoman modeled after herself, while Nakagawa plays the Yogen-gyo (予言魚) who first leads Beerus to Goku. The Fuji TV announcer Shin-ichi Karube also has a small part in the film. When Toriyama originally designed Yogen-gyo, he intended for the character to be larger than a person. But because he did not provide a scale chart to the animation team, the character ended up being small enough to fit in someone's palm.

The April issue of V Jump teased about a new Super Saiyan transformation being in the film, titled "Super Saiyan God" (超サイヤ人ゴッド, Sūpā Saiya-jin Goddo), saying: 39 years ago, the Oracle Fish told Beerus that the Super Saiyan God would appear before him. And that this is the beginning of the film's story. In Weekly Shōnen Jump issue #14 of 2013, Toriyama said that the plot for Battle of Gods began two years ago with ideas for the God of Destruction and Super Saiyan God, and that he got deeply involved in the story in order to keep it in-line with the series' original tone so kids could enjoy it. In the following week's issue, he revealed that Beerus' design is based on a cat and his clothes based on Egyptian garments.

A live greeting by cast members and Toriyama, followed by a preview screening of the film took place across Japan on Tuesday, March 12, 2013, with a limited number of attendees determined from a Jump lottery. The lottery tickets were included in 22 different Shueisha magazines (including Weekly Shōnen Jump, V Jump, Jump SQ, and Ultra Jump) and 884 pairs (1768 people) were invited. There were five screenings, all the same day and at 6:30 p.m: Shinjuku Wald 9 cinema in Tokyo (428 people), Umeda Burg 7 theater in Osaka (440 people), 109 Cinemas in Nagoya (256 people), T-Joy Hakata in Fukuoka (322 people), and Sapporo Cinema Frontier in Sapporo (322 people). The special cast greeting at the Tokyo venue was beamed live to the other locations before the screening. A second preview screening with an on-stage greeting and a special guest took place at Differ Ariake Arena on March 16, 2013, with 250 pairs (500 people) invited (determined with lottery tickets included in V Jump, Weekly Shōnen Jump, and Saikyō Jump).

=== Music ===
The music in Battle of Gods was composed by Norihito Sumitomo. Its theme song is a cover of Hironobu Kageyama's "Cha-La Head-Cha-La", the original opening theme of Dragon Ball Z, by the rock band Flow. The band members commented that they were excited about the opportunity as they have been fans of the series since they were in elementary school. The cover and the film's insert song, "Hero ~Song of Hope~" (HERO~希望の歌~, Hīro ~Kibō no Uta~), were released as a double A-side single on March 20, 2013. It reached number 24 on the Oricon Weekly Singles Chart. The film's original soundtrack, containing 43 tracks, was released on March 27, 2013. Due to licensing agreements, the international editions of the film use English-language versions of Flow's "Cha-La Head-Cha-La" and "Hero ~Song of Hope~".

The music to the trailers in Japan was composed by Immediate Music whom specialize in providing trailer music for films, such as Avatar, the Matrix films and the Harry Potter films. The trailers use the pieces "Prologue to Conquest" (Trailerhead: NU EPIQ) and "Emergence of Empires" (Trailerhead: Saga), both composed by Yoav Goren with the latter based on "Conquest of Kingdoms" from Epic Choral Action #1 and "Rising Empires" from Themes for Orchestra & Choir 2: Abbey Road respectively. Pfeifer Broz. Music supplied "Evil Island" for Funimation's promotions and trailers in North America.

== Marketing ==
=== Promotions ===
The July 14, 2012 issue of Weekly Shōnen Jump published the first promotional images for the film; featuring Goku, Gohan, Piccolo, Kuririn, Goten, Trunks, Vegeta, and Shenlong, with the tagline "The mightiest make their move" (最強、始動, Saikyō, Shidō), followed by "All humanity has been waiting. For excitement like none before..." (全人類待望。かつてない興奮へー, Zen jinrui taibō. Katsute nai kōfun e). On July 21, 2012, a short teaser trailer announcing the film was shown at the Saikyō V Jump Festa, and later that month shown on television. The teaser trailer was added to the film's official website in August 2012. In less than a week the video was viewed over 3.5 million times.

With the film title revealed in November 2012, a special pre-sale collaboration ticket with the One Piece Film: Z film was made to commemorate the release of the two films. The dual-ticket good for both films has a special new illustration by both Eiichirō Oda (author of One Piece) and Akira Toriyama. Limited to 8,989 across Japan, the tickets went on sale on November 23, 2012, for ¥2,600 (US$31.51) apiece. The film's poster and two new characters' names and voice actors were officially revealed in December 2012 in Weekly Shōnen Jump's first issue of 2013; Beerus, the God of Destruction voiced by Kōichi Yamadera and the mysterious Whis voiced by Masakazu Morita. The film poster displays Super Saiyan Goku combating the God of Destruction Beerus, with Whis floating showered in light in the background. Various other characters from the series are also featured on the poster (Mr. Satan, Mr. Buu, Videl, the shrunken Pilaf gang, Super Saiyan Goten, Super Saiyan Gohan, Super Saiyan Vegeta, Super Saiyan Trunks, Bulma, Piccolo, Tenshinhan, Kuririn, Yamcha and Puar).

The first full trailer for the film was aired on Fuji TV on December 7, 2012, during the morning show Mezamashi TV. A 30-minute Battle of Gods discussion panel was held at Jump Festa 2013; on the Jump Super Stage, on December 22, 2012. Along with the voice actors Masako Nozawa, Mayumi Tanaka, Toshio Furukawa, the film director Masahiro Hosoda, V Jump editor-in-chief Akio Iyoku, and Toei Animation producer Gyarmath Bogdan took part at the discussion which was overseen by former YBS TV announcer Mariko Nakagomi. The second full trailer for the film began being streamed on Cinema Today's website on February 27, 2013. In late March 2013, Cinema Today's website began streaming a TV ad for the film that features Frieza (Ryūsei Nakao) and Cell (Norio Wakamoto); Cell questions why he isn't in the film and Frieza brags that he is, Cell then remarks that Frieza only has a non-speaking appearance.

=== Collaborations ===
During the 30th Prize Fair, which took place in Tokyo on November 7, 2012, Bandai showcased some of their new Dragon Ball figures for winter 2012, as well their World Collectable Figure line produced in conjunction with the 2013 film. The latter is a set of eight figures around 7 cm tall that covers characters that appear in the film; along with Vegeta and Super Saiyan 3 Goku, the three members of the Pilaf gang were among the figures revealed.

In February 2013, several collaborative projects between Dragon Ball Z: Battle of Gods and KFC in Japan began. On the seventh, the restaurants began selling "Smile Sets with Strongest Battle Goods — Parents and Kids Play Together!", which came with Dragon Ball Z games such as reversi and playing cards. On the fifteenth, the KFC restaurants in Sapporo, Sendai, Ebisu, Sakae, Osaka, Hakata and Okinawa dressed their Colonel Sanders statues as Goku, with each one holding a different starred Dragon Ball. They began selling "Strongest Sets" that come with "Light Up! Dragon Bottles" or "Dream Dragon Radar detectors" on February 28, and a TV ad featuring Goku began airing.

As part of a collaboration with the Japanese J. League Division 1 football team Albirex Niigata, a special poster unveiled on the official Battle of Gods website on February 20, 2013, was displayed across Niigata Prefecture in promotion of their match with the defending league Division 1 champions Sanfrecce Hiroshima on March 3, 2013. The poster is based on the Battle of Gods poster, with the film characters replaced by the football team's players: the figure in the background replacing Whis is the team's manager Masaaki Yanagishita, Beerus has been replaced by the Sanfrecce Hiroshima goalkeeper Shūsaku Nishikawa, and Goku is replaced by the team's forward Bruno Lopes. All supporters at the match wore orange, Goku made an "appearance" at the stadium, and the Dragon Ball Z theme song was used.

From March 5 to April 8 the Lawson convenience stores sold special Battle of Gods inspired food items, such as Dragon Ball pizza balls, Super Saiyan fries, Demon King Piccolo's Green Tea Cream Puffs, Majin Buu Milk Pudding and Vegeta's Green Salad.

=== Tie-ins with other media ===
The March 2013 issue of V Jump revealed that Beerus would appear in the Dragon Ball Heroes arcade game as a boss battle, and subsequently in its Nintendo 3DS version titled Dragon Ball Heroes: Ultimate Mission. It also announced the Dragon Ball Z Festival at Toei Kyoto Studio Park from March 16 to September 8 in celebration of Battle of the Gods. Starting on March 30, Beerus appeared in the Dragon Ball arcade game Zenkai Battle Royale. Beerus, Whis, and Goku's Super Saiyan God form are all playable characters in the video game Battle of Z.

A manga adaptation of Battle of Gods ran in the April 2013 issue of Saikyō Jump, which went on sale on March 4, 2013. Drawn by Naho Ōishi, who currently draws the Dragon Ball SD series in the magazine and previously Dragon Ball: Episode of Bardock in V Jump, it depicts the beginning of the film. An anime comic version, more commonly known as "ani-manga" in the west, of Battle of Gods was released on October 4, 2013.

Battle of Gods received its television debut on Fuji TV on March 22, 2014, at 9:00 pm. Toei Animation producer Gyarmath Bogdan confirmed through Twitter that the broadcast included up to twenty minutes of extra scenes and additional footage. The broadcast earned an average household rating of 13.1%.

The 2015 Dragon Ball Z: Resurrection 'F' film is a sequel to Battle of Gods and features Beerus and Whis.

The first story arc of Dragon Ball Super is a retelling of sorts of Battle of Gods, though some events are altered or expanded in the series' version of events. The "Battle of Gods" arc covers episodes 1–14.

== Release and reception ==
Battle of Gods is the first-ever Japanese film to be screened at IMAX Digital Theaters, screening at all 16 IMAX Digital Theater locations across Japan. However, it was not shown in 3D.

Madman Entertainment announced they had acquired the Australasian rights to the film and screened the film at the 2013 Japanese Film Festival in Australia from October to December. On May 30, 2014, Funimation announced that they had acquired the North American rights to the film and gave the film a limited theatrical run in North America from August 5–7 and 9, 2014. Funimation held a red carpet premiere for Dragon Ball Z: Battle of Gods in Los Angeles on July 3. The 8:00 p.m. red carpet and 9:00 p.m. screening was at the Regal LA Live Stadium 14 Theaters. Madman screened Funimation's dub at a handful of Australasian theaters on August 30, 2014. Manga Entertainment, the United Kingdom's distributor of the series, announced at the MCM Manchester Comic Con that they licensed the film and would give it a limited theatrical release, including an appearance at the 2014 Scotland Loves Anime convention.

On October 17 and 18, 2023, the extended version was screened at US theaters in commemoration of the film's 10th anniversary.

=== Box office ===
Dragon Ball Z: Battle of Gods opened at number one in the Japanese box office, earning US$7,307,760 with 561,098 tickets sold in its first two days. The film's showings at all 16 of the IMAX Digital theaters in Japan that weekend earned US$450,000, with an average of US$28,000 per screen. It was ranked number five in the overseas box office chart by Variety, making it the top-grossing non-American film on the chart. While the top four films are playing in over 50 territories each, Battle of Gods' performance is based only on 328 screens in Japan. By its fifth day, the film had made over US$12,000,000 with 988,790 tickets sold. As a result, the film was projected to sell more than 1 million tickets by its sixth day, making it the fastest film to reach that milestone so far that year in Japan. It was number one in its second week as well, with a total of 1,488,518 tickets sold and an estimated US$19,017,008 total earnings. The film was number one for a third week, raising its total to US$23,618,327 with 1,823,141 tickets sold, making it the fastest-grossing film of 2013 in Japan. It dropped to fourth place the subsequent weekend of April 20–21, but total tickets sold passed the two million mark and its total revenue climbed to US$26,419,641. The film dropped to eighth during Golden Week, which is when many new films open in theaters and is the film industry's best week in Japan, while the box office gross grew to US$28,162,444 and tickets reached 2,181,328. The following week it held on to the eighth place, with tickets sold increasing to 2,346,726 and its gross to US$29,172,291.

Toei aimed for Battle of Gods to earn a domestic Japanese box office take of ¥3 billion ($32 million). In December 2013, Oricon listed Battle of Gods as the Japanese box office's eleventh highest-grossing film of the year earning a box office take of ¥3 billion. The film earned $2.8 million in North American theaters in 8 days, placing it eleventh on a list of the highest-grossing theatrically released anime in North America of all time according to Box Office Mojo. The film grossed $17,961,356 in other regions, including $15,587,504 in Latin America, the film's most successful overseas region. The film sold more than 4 million tickets in Latin America.

=== Critical reception ===
The review aggregator Rotten Tomatoes reported that 89% of critics have given the film a positive review based on 9 reviews, with an average rating of 6.5/10. Richard Eisenbeis writing for Kotaku called the film "a great nostalgic trip from beginning to end." He noted that it was focused on lighthearted moments, but that the "comedic moments were not only funny but also true to the series, and the fight scenes were excellent one and all." He particularly praised the animation as the best of the series, due to technological advancements since the early 1990s, and declared that the highlight of the film was how in the end the villain was undoubtedly the winner over Goku in a "complete reversal of the standard DBZ formula". Otaku USA's Matt Schley agreed that it is a comedy heavy film "more reminiscent of the original Dragon Ball than Z". He speculates that the viewer's enjoyment of the film depends on what they expect; "If you want epic Dragon Ball Z story worthy of the title Battle of Gods, this film may disappoint. But if you're just happy to see your favorite characters performing a few animated hijinx again after all these years, this film certainly delivers."

Leah B. Jackson of IGN gave the English dub of the film a 7.5 out of 10, praising the animation and fight scenes, particularly the final battle. She was pleased to see Funimation's voice actors return, but criticized the film for the lack of iconic techniques and having too much "filler". Theron Martin of Anime News Network (ANN) praised the film for its humor, use of main and supporting cast, the introduction of Beerus and Whis and the overall light-hearted nature and plot. But also criticized the film for its inconsistent animation, uninspiring fight scenes and use of CGI, stating, "Ultimately Battle of Gods is entirely a movie for long-established fans, as it has too many in-jokes that those not familiar with wide swaths of the franchise would get. It is not a stellar addition to the franchise but is a worthwhile and at least moderately entertaining one, provided that one does not go into it expecting an action magnum opus." Kyle Mills Of DVD Talk highly recommended the film, praising the dub and the perfect balancing of the humor elements from the first Dragon Ball anime with the action elements of Dragon Ball Z. He finished with, "Dragon Ball Z: Battle of Gods is one hell of a fun flick. For any fan of the Dragon Ball franchise, you need to check it out.[...] [It is] a film full of nostalgia, fun characters, legitimate laugh out loud moments, and slick action sequences. It's a film that showcases perfectly why the Dragon Ball franchise has such long lasting popularity."

=== Home media ===
The film was released in Japan in standard and limited edition Blu-ray and DVD formats on September 13, 2013. In addition to the design material and trailer collections included in the regular edition, the limited edition includes behind the scenes footage, interviews, and the 2008 short film Dragon Ball: Yo! Son Goku and His Friends Return!!, as well as a figure, booklet, and special postcards. The home video release of Battle of Gods sold approximately 50,381 copies in its first week. By the end of the year, it had sold 33,737 Blu-rays and 46,761 DVDs. The extended TV version of the film was released on Blu-ray and DVD on March 13, 2015, selling approximately 1,666 copies in its first week.

Funimation released the theatrical and extended TV versions in North America on Blu-ray and DVD on October 7, 2014. A similar set was released in the United Kingdom by Manga Entertainment on November 10, 2014. Madman Entertainment released the film in Australia and New Zealand on Blu-ray and DVD on November 26, 2014.

== See also ==
- List of Dragon Ball films
