= Mr. Satan =

Fictional character from Dragon Ball

Mr. Satan Mark
- Dragon Ball character
- Mr. Satan, drawn by Akira Toriyama
- First appearance: Weekly Shōnen Jump chapter 393: "The New Kami-sama", October 6, 1992 (Weekly Shōnen Jump 1992 #44)
- Created by: Akira Toriyama
- Voiced by: Japanese: Daisuke Gōri (1992–2010); Unshō Ishizuka (2010–2018); Masashi Ebara (2020–present); Tōru Sakurai (Mini; Dragon Ball Daima); English: Don Brown (Ocean); Chris Rager (Funimation)

In-universe information
- Spouse: Miguel (wife)
- Children: Videl (daughter)
- Relatives: Son Gohan (son-in-law); Pan (granddaughter); Son Goku Jr. (great-great-great-great-grandson; Dragon Ball GT)

Mr. Satan (Japanese: ミスター・サタン, Hepburn: Misutā Satan), known as Hercule Satan in certain edited versions of the English dub and in Viz's English manga, is a character from the Dragon Ball media franchise. Created by Akira Toriyama, he first appears in Chapter 393 of the Dragon Ball manga entitled "The New Kami-sama", originally published in Issue 44 of Weekly Shōnen Jump on October 6, 1992. Within the series, he is a flamboyant martial artist who becomes a world-renowned hero after he falsely claimed credit for the defeat of the villainous Cell. Years later, he befriends the primordial being Majin Buu and convinces him of the error of his murderous way, leading Buu to expel his evil tendencies which become a different lifeform altogether. After aiding series protagonist Goku in vanquishing the evil incarnation of Buu, the benevolent incarnation moves in with Mr. Satan, and both characters continue to make recurring appearances as supporting characters in the series.

== Development ==
Series creator Akira Toriyama explained that "Mr. Satan" is a ring name akin to an in-ring persona or character used by real-life professional wrestlers. In another interview, Toriyama revealed that his real name is Mark (マーク, Māku), a pun on the Japanese word akuma (悪魔), which refers to a malevolent demonic spirit in Japanese folklore. Toriyama also noted that the character is from a cultural region which does not use surnames. In keeping with the naming convention of related Dragon Ball characters after puns with a common theme, his daughter Videl's name is an anagram of the word devil. His spouse is never named or discussed within the series, though Toriyama suggested that she was a beautiful singer named "Miguel" (ミゲル, migeru), essentially his angelic counterpart based on the notion of an unconventional marriage between both characters.

Due to negative cultural connotations surrounding his namesake, Mr. Satan is renamed in media translated for international audiences in some parts of the world. In North America, he is known as Hercule in early English language dubs for the Dragon Ball Z anime, as well as the localized English manga published by Viz Media. In their initial dub of the series, Funimation changed his name to Hercule. However, when they recorded a new dub for uncut home video releases, they switched to using the original Mr. Satan name. In the Philippines, the character is known as Master Pogi. The English dub of Dragon Ball Z Kai retains his original name.

=== Portrayal ===
Mr. Satan was voiced by Daisuke Gōri in Japan until his death in 2010. then by Unshō Ishizuka until his death in 2018, with Masashi Ebara being the current voice, except for Dragon Ball Daima, where a mini version of Mr. Satan was voiced by Tōru Sakurai. In English, he is voiced by Don Brown in the Ocean dub, and Chris Rager in the Funimation dub.

== Appearances ==
=== Dragon Ball Z ===
Mr. Satan first appears during the Cell Games as a preening challenger of Cell. According to his backstory, once Goku and his companions stop attending the World Martial Arts Tournament, he starts winning the annual World Martial Arts Tournaments and becomes the reigning champion for many years. Mr. Satan attempts to fight Cell but is swatted away in one hit. In spite of this, he is given credit for Cell's death by the media and celebrated as a hero.^{[ch. 421]}

Years later, he is revealed to be the father of Videl, the would-be love interest of Gohan, and is still revered throughout the world of Dragon Ball as a hero. He later encounters and befriends Majin Buu: after convincing him of the error of his murderous ways, the benevolent influence within Buu moves the creature to reform, leading him to expel his evil tendencies which become a different lifeform altogether. This aspect of Buu is identical in appearance to his chubby progenitor, although any malevolent behavioral traits previously displayed are gone. He is also much weaker in power, and lacks some of the original Majin Buu's unique capabilities.

As one of the few survivors of the evil Buu's destructive rampage which culminated in the destruction of Earth, Mr. Satan escapes to the Supreme Kai's sacred realm along with Goku and his remaining associates. When Goku is on the verge of losing the final fight against Buu's evil incarnation, Mr. Satan rallies the people of Earth to turn the tide in Goku's favor by directing them to contribute their energy to Goku's Genki-Dama (Note: lit. "Energy Sphere" (元気玉)) (Note: Renamed to "Spirit Bomb" in Funimation's dub.), an energy sphere attack created by gathering energy from surrounding animals, nature and humans. Following the demise of the evil Buu by Goku, his benevolent counterpart moves in with Mr. Satan and his pet Labrador Retriever Bee (ベエ, Bē), and goes by Mr. Buu (ミスター・ブウ, Misutā Bū), while Mr. Satan again takes the credit for defeating evil Buu, though Goku and his friends willingly go along with it to keep their lives private and out of respect for Mr. Satan's vital role in Buu's defeat.

=== Later series ===
Mr. Satan makes minor appearances in the Dragon Ball GT anime series, where he is protected from the extraterrestrial villain Baby's influence by Majin Buu and later his successor, Uub.

Mr. Satan again appears as a supporting character in Dragon Ball Super, where he is often seen in the company of Mr. Buu. Mr. Satan essentially serves as the caretaker of his friend as Buu has a childlike personality. He is depicted as having grown immensely wealthy due to the monetary rewards he received from his false claims of successfully defending Earth from multiple external threats. In one episode of the anime version, Mr. Satan enacts an imaginary fight with Beerus, the God of Destruction, in a televised retelling of the series' in-universe events where he embellishes himself with the ability to power up as a Super Saiyan.

=== Films ===
Mr. Satan appears as a supporting character in multiple spinoff films of the Dragon Ball Z series, namely Bojack Unbound, Bio-Broly and Fusion Reborn, as well as the 2008 television special Dragon Ball: Yo! Son Goku and His Friends Return!!.

=== In other media ===
Mr. Satan appears in the Dragon Ball x One Piece: Cross Epoch manga, a crossover between the Dragon Ball and One Piece series, and in the 2013 crossover show Dream 9 Toriko & One Piece & Dragon Ball Z Super Collaboration Special!!.

Mr. Satan has appeared in several Dragon Ball video games, often as a comically ineffective "joke" playable character. The character "Morrie", from the game Dragon Quest VIII closely resembles an emaciated version of Mr. Satan's older form. In Dragon Ball Z Abridged, the character is known as Mark Satan.

== Reception ==
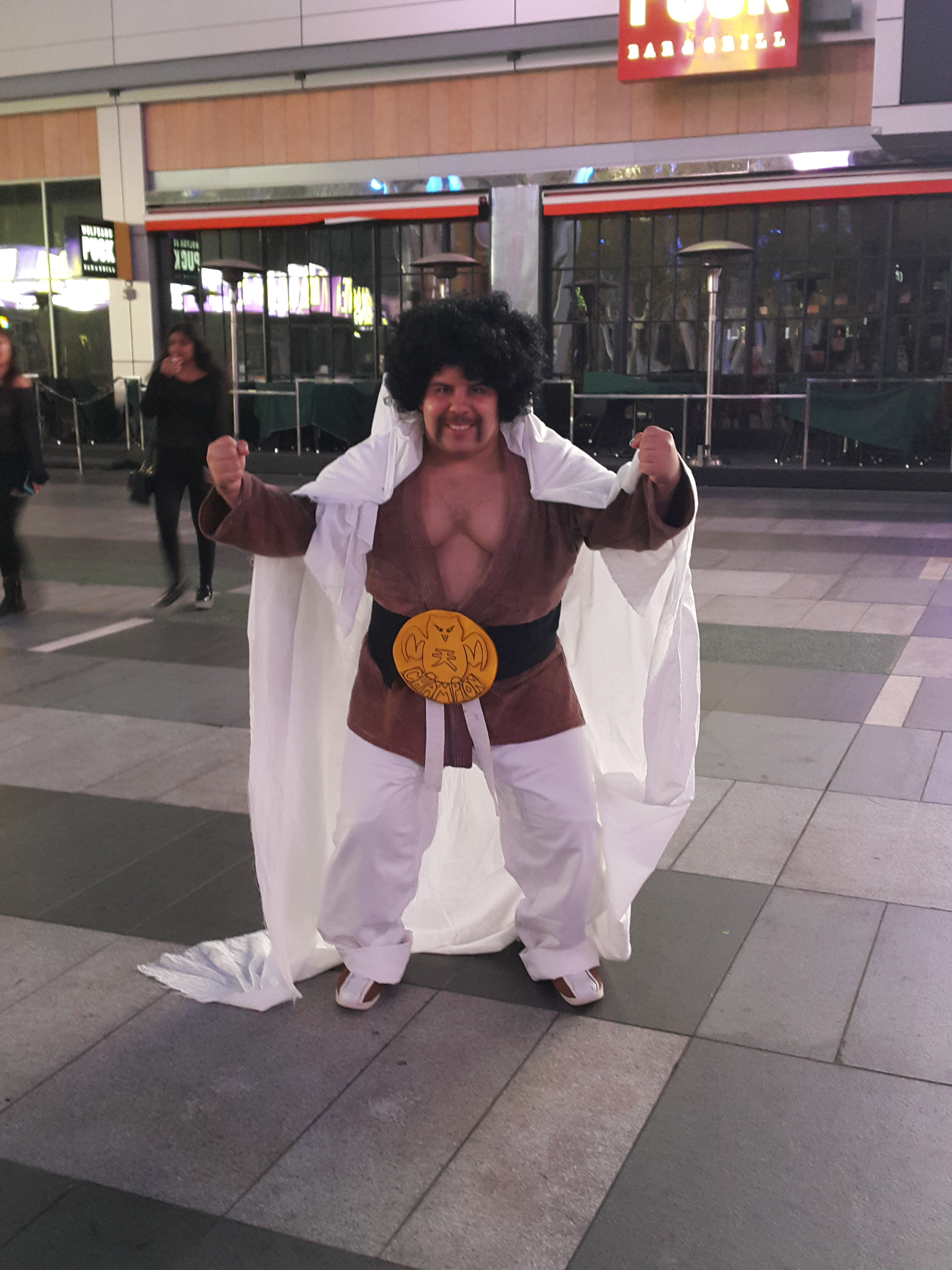
Cosplayer portraying Mr. Satan.

In 1993, Mr. Satan placed seventh in a Dragon Ball character popularity poll voted on by Weekly Shōnen Jump readers, and was also voted the eleventh most popular character by fans of the series for the 2004 book Dragon Ball Forever. The character has been the subject of fan art and custom merchandise.

In his review of Season 6 of the Dragon Ball series, Anime News Network's Theron Martin said Mr. Satan "may be the most obnoxious major character within the entire series", and that he found the character's "cowardice and efforts to play off the power of Cell and the Z fighters as some kind of trick" to be a nuisance even within the context of his comic relief nature. Martin noted that Mr. Satan does have some semblance of self-awareness in that he knows he is severely outclassed by the other main characters, and that he serves as a yardstick between them and the rest of humanity. Martin judged Mr. Satan's antics in Season 8 to be less irritating and more amusing or entertaining than his earlier appearances in the series, particularly with his efforts to claim glory for himself or to "weasel out a victory".

Brandon Zachary from CBR described Mr. Satan as the "J. Jonah Jameson of Dragon Ball" due to his morally complex nature. Patricia Hernandez from Kotaku consider the scenes which feature Mr. Satan and Mr. Buu to be among her favorite moments of the first episode of Dragon Ball Super, and looked forward to seeing more of their interactions together. Both Hernandez and Zachary observed that while Mr. Satan achieved his prestigious social status through deception, he does show a conscience as well as a charitable side to his character. Evan Valentine from Comicbook.com noted that while Mr. Satan is not very heroic himself, he nevertheless plays an important role in tempering Majin Buu's personality and helps the former villain to reform into a genuine hero. Valentine also highlighted his character development throughout the series' history, noting that underneath the attention-seeking and boastful exterior is a personality who truly cares for his family and friends, such as willingly (albeit secretively) giving up the reward money received in a ceremony honoring his believed heroic acts to Goku, who both deserved and needed it more than he did. Game designer Hiroshi Matsuyama from CyberConnect2 was pleased that Mr. Satan, a representative of the feeble human race, is the only character who could emotionally connect with Buu, and later became the savior of the world when he leveraged his celebrity influence for the Genki-Dama attack prepared by Goku, an appealing but ultimately unrelatable protagonist for Matsuyama.
