= Videl =

Dragon Ball character

- Dragon Ball character
- Videl (middle), with Gohan (left) and Mr. Satan (right). Drawn by Akira Toriyama
- First appearance: Weekly Shōnen Jump chapter 421: "Herculopolis High" (Weekly Shōnen Jump 1993 #23)
- Created by: Akira Toriyama
- Voiced by: Japanese: Yūko Minaguchi; Shino Kakinuma (Dragon Ball Kai); English: Moneca Stori (Ocean); Kara Edwards (Funimation); Susan Huber (Dragon Ball GT) (Funimation); Erika Harlacher (Bang Zoom! Entertainment)

In-universe information
- Aliases: The Great Saiyawoman; Great Saiyaman 2
- Occupation: Martial artist, martial art teacher, student
- Family: Mr. Satan (father); Miguel (mother)
- Spouse: Son Gohan (husband)
- Children: Pan (daughter)
- Relatives: Son Goku (father-in-law); Chi-Chi (mother-in-law); Son Goten (brother-in-law); Goku Jr. (great grandson); Bardock (grandfather-in-law); Gine (grandmother-in-law); Ox-King (grandfather-in-law); Ox Queen (grandmother-in-law); Raditz (uncle-in-law); Son Goku Jr. (great-great-great-grandson; Dragon Ball GT)

Videl (ビーデル, Bīderu) is a fictional character from the Dragon Ball media franchise. Created by Akira Toriyama, she first appears in Chapter 421 of the Dragon Ball manga originally published in Issue 23 of Weekly Shōnen Jump on May 11, 1993. She is the daughter of Mr. Satan, the love interest of Gohan, and mother of Pan.

Videl's reception has been generally positive with series fans, whereas commentators have mixed views about her relevance as a character. As one of the few major female Dragon Ball characters, her role in the series as well as other Dragon Ball media has been variously described as important or inconsequential by commentators.

== Development ==
Like many Dragon Ball characters whose names are puns, the character's name is an anagram of devil as her father's name is Mr. Satan; he is known as Hercule in edited versions of the English dub and in the English manga published by Viz Media. While she is training with Gohan for the World Martial Arts Tournament, Videl mentions that her mother died. Otherwise, Videl's mother is never named or discussed within the series, though Toriyama suggested that her mother is a beautiful singer named "Miguel" (ミゲル, migeru), based on the notion of an unconventional marriage between her (an "archangel") and him (a "devil"). In keeping with the theme of her naming convention, the numerical registration identifier for Videl's vehicle registration plate is 666.

Unlike her father, who is depicted as a showboating yet cowardly comic relief character, Videl is characterized with more heroic traits and displays an admirable fighting potential. Her hairstyle went through multiple drafts before the final design of twin pigtails was chosen in 1992, though the alternate hair designs have been used for other characters in the series, including Bulma.

=== Portrayal ===
Videl is voiced by Yūko Minaguchi in the original Japanese anime, and by Shino Kakinuma in Dragon Ball Kai. In English localizations, Videl is voiced by Moneca Stori in the Ocean dub, Kara Edwards in the Funimation dub, and Erika Harlacher in the Bang Zoom! Entertainment dub. Minaguchi and Edwards are the most consistent voice actresses for the majority of Videl's appearances in video games and other media.

== Appearances ==
=== Dragon Ball Z ===
Videl first appears as a headstrong, tomboyish vigilante who assists the police force of Satan City. (Note: Known as Herculopolis in certain edited versions of the English dub and in Viz's English manga.) Gohan, her classmate at Orange Star High School, (Note: Known as Herculopolis High in certain edited versions of the English dub and in Viz's English manga.) soon learns that she is the daughter of Mr. Satan, who took credit for his defeat of Cell years ago and is celebrated worldwide as a hero. She grew up learning martial arts in order to emulate her father, and uses her fighting abilities in her crime fighting activities.

She becomes suspicious of Gohan after she notices him at school and eventually discovers his secret identity as the Great Saiyaman. She then uses this information to blackmail him into teaching her how to fly by utilizing her ki. She also gradually develops a liking for Gohan, even cutting her hair at his innocuous suggestion that long hair may get in the way of a fight. Videl later enters the 25th Tenka'ichi Budokai martial arts tournament, but is brutally beaten by a magically empowered man named Spopovitch in a slanted match, enraging Gohan and sparking a chain of events which leads to the revival of Majin Buu.

Videl is devastated when she learns that Gohan is presumed dead as a result of his initial defeat by Buu. She, along with the family members and associates of the series' main characters, are relocated to Kami's Lookout after Buu goes on a murderous rampage throughout the world. Videl is later killed when Buu discovers and reaches the refuge. She is later returned to life through the power of the Namekian Dragon Balls. By the ending of the original series, following a ten-year gap, Videl is married to Gohan and they have a daughter named Pan.^{[ch. 518]}

=== Dragon Ball Super ===
Videl's appearance is redesigned for Dragon Ball Super, which takes place chronologically after the defeat of Majin Buu but prior to the ending of the original Dragon Ball series. During Bulma's birthday party, Videl reveals that she is pregnant, and participates in a ritual on behalf of her unborn daughter Pan to enable Goku to transform into a Super Saiyan God, where her hair briefly turns golden yellow like that of a Super Saiyan. Pan is born later in the series and makes recurring appearances as a minor supporting character cared for by her mother.

A noteworthy subplot in the anime version of Super involves Videl being coveted by famed actor Barry Kahn, who is corrupted by an alien organism and later defeated by Gohan who revives his Great Saiyaman gimmick.

=== Dragon Ball GT ===
Videl plays a minor role in the Dragon Ball GT series, and is often seen in the company of her mother-in-law Chi-Chi. Videl and Gohan are later possessed by Baby and attack their daughter Pan. They are intercepted by Uub and later cured from Baby's influence. Videl is last seen when Goku says goodbye to everyone and departs the mortal world with Shenron at the end of the series.

=== In Akira Toriyama's films ===
Videl appears as a supporting character in multiple films with the Dragon Ball Z branding. In Broly – Second Coming, she accompanies Gohan, Goten and Trunks in their search for the Dragon Balls and encounters a revived Broly. In Fusion Reborn she assists Chi-Chi with domestic chores, and later Gohan with fending off a horde of revived villains from the series' history. in Wrath of the Dragon, she pursues criminals as a costumed vigilante alongside Gohan, calling herself the Great Saiyawoman or the Great Saiyaman 2.

Her participation in the Super Saiyan God ritual in Dragon Ball Super is an adaptation of a similar scene from the 2013 film Dragon Ball Z: Battle of Gods. In this version, Gohan discovers that Videl is pregnant with their child after she is accidentally injured by a pistol-wielding Mai from the Pilaf Gang.

Videl makes a minor appearance in Dragon Ball Super: Super Hero, in which she requests Piccolo to pick up Pan from school as both she and Gohan were too busy.

=== Other appearances ===
Videl appears in the 2008 Dragon Ball: Yo! Son Goku and His Friends Return!! television special, and the 2013 crossover show Dream 9 Toriko & One Piece & Dragon Ball Z Super Collaboration Special!!.

Videl has appeared in several Dragon Ball video games, often as a playable character: examples include the Dragon Ball Z: Budokai series, the Dragon Ball Z: Budokai Tenkaichi series, Super Dragon Ball Z, Dragon Ball Xenoverse and its sequel.

She appears in post-launch downloadable content for 2018's Dragon Ball FighterZ, initially as a match commentator in March 2018, and later as a playable character in 2019. Videl is the only character in FighterZ with an alternate appearance: players may toggle between her default short haired look and her original twin pigtail hairstyle. She is also playable in Dragon Ball: Sparking! Zero.

== Reception ==
Videl is one of the Dragon Ball franchise's most popular female characters. In a 2004 popularity poll participated by Japanese voters, Videl was ranked the twentieth most popular character of the Dragon Ball series. Videl remains a popular subject for cosplay activities and fan art by Dragon Ball fandom.

In his review of the DVD compilation of the original anime's season 8, Anime News Network's Theron Martin criticized the naming convention of the daughter of a man named Mr. Satan as "corny" and part of the series' "grating jokes". Martin found that Videl's voice actress for the Funimation English dub, Kara Edwards, were among the few weak performances in the series, which surprised him as he considered her performance as Goten to be vastly superior.

Some commentators have discussed Videl's role within the context of the overall portrayal of female characters in the Dragon Ball series. Antonio Sánchez-Migallón from HobbyConsolas lamented that Videl went from a strong heroic character who is determined to defend her city as a vigilante to emulating her mother-in-law as a domesticated housewife whose only function is to look after Pan and her home. Similarly, Martin said Videl is too underutilized to make much of an impact. Conversely, Valdez praised Videl's characterization as a supportive wife to Gohan and dedicated mother to Pan during the Barry Kahn subplot in Super. In response to a Valencian television network's decision to ban the airing of Dragon Ball due to allegations of its sexist content, Maigo Gomez from GeeksTerra argued that Videl is one of several examples of a strong female character with agency in the series, as opposed to a damsel in distress who is in need of rescuing.

Ian Walker from Kotaku reported that multiple professional esports competitors praised Videl's playable appearance in Dragon Ball FighterZ for her "fast, tricky" style as well as her strong "mix ups", which refers to a combination of different attacks that require the opposing player to employ specific defenses to guard against. On the other hand, Kevin Cardignan from PC Invasion claimed that Videl is one of the worst characters in FighterZ as she lacks a standard reflect mechanic and could only dodge instead, rendering her "susceptible to levels of pressure" which can be easily ignored by other characters.
