= Dragon Ball: Yo! Son Goku and His Friends Return!! =

2008 film by Yoshihiro Ueda

- Promotional image

ドラゴンボール オッス! 帰ってきた孫悟空と仲間たち!! (Doragon Bōru Ossu! Kaette Kita Son Gokū to Nakama-tachi!!)
- Created by: Akira Toriyama
- Anime film
- Directed by: Yoshihiro Ueda
- Written by: Takao Koyama (screenplay); Akira Toriyama (story concept)
- Music by: Shunsuke Kikuchi
- Studio: Toei Animation
- Released: September 21, 2008 (Japan)
- Runtime: 35 minutes
- Manga
- Written by: Naho Ōishi
- Published by: Shueisha
- Magazine: V-Jump
- Original run: March 21, 2009 – April 21, 2009
- Volumes: 1

Dragon Ball: Yo! Son Goku and His Friends Return!! (Note: Dragon Ball: Yo! Son Goku and His Friends Return!! (Japanese: ドラゴンボール オッス! 帰ってきた孫悟空と仲間たち!!, Hepburn: Doragon Bōru Ossu! Kaette Kita Son Gokū to Nakama-tachi!!)) is a 35-minute Japanese animated short film based on Akira Toriyama's Dragon Ball series, shown on the Jump Super Anime Tour from September 21 to November 23, 2008. It was the first animated Dragon Ball film in twelve years, following the tenth anniversary film The Path to Power.

== Plot ==
Two years after Kid Buu's defeat by Goku, Mr. Satan, feeling guilty that his new hotel is in honor of what the majority of Earth believes to be his victory over Kid Buu, invites Goku, Vegeta, and their families to a banquet. During dinner, two Saiyan spaceships land and a mysterious Saiyan and his wife confront the heroes at the hotel. Vegeta's younger brother, Tarble, introduces himself and explains that he was deemed weak by their father King Vegeta and sent to a distant planet before the destruction of Planet Vegeta by Frieza. He also introduces his wife Gure, a small alien humanoid. Tarble asks his brother for help in dealing with Abo and Kado, soldiers from remnants of Frieza's army, who are causing havoc on his planet.

As Abo and Kado arrive on Earth, the heroes pick radishes from Goku's garden to determine who will battle the duo and Goten picks the longest. Pressured by his father, Trunks picks out a radish that stretches for miles. Goten joins Trunks in the fight and the children easily defeat the two soldiers until Abo and Kado create doubles of themselves. With encouragement from Gohan, Goten and Trunks gain the upper hand. Abo and Kado merge into their larger, more powerful form, Aka.

Aka devastates Goten and Trunks so they perform the Fusion Dance, fail their first attempt, but succeed with in the second. Now fully powered as Gotenks, he quickly appears to defeat Aka. However, while everyone is celebrating, Aka attacks again after Gotenks taunts him; but Piccolo blocks the attack. Aka destroys most of the hotel and with the threat growing, Goku and Vegeta join the fight; but Goku tricks Vegeta into looking away while he defeats Aka with a Kamehameha wave. With the battle over, everyone returns to what is left of the hotel and continue the banquet. Abo and Kado join in on the feast. The special ends with Goku and Vegeta fighting over food, transforming into Super Saiyans as they argue.

== Characters ==
Abo (アボ)
Red alien wearing battle armor and Kado's brother.
Kado (カド)
Blue alien wearing battle armor and Abo's brother.
Aka (アカ)
The fusion of Abo and Kado (Goten and Trunks jokingly call him "Abokado", a reference to avocado).
Tarble (ターブル, Tāburu)
Vegeta's younger brother, who had previously been sent away from Planet Vegeta by King Vegeta. He is later mentioned in the films Dragon Ball Z: Battle of Gods (2013) and Dragon Ball Super: Broly (2018).
Gure (グレ)
A small pink and white alien from the planet that Tarble was sent to and became his wife.

== Cast ==
Character	Japanese voice actor
Son Goku	Masako Nozawa
Son Gohan	Masako Nozawa
Son Goten	Masako Nozawa
Vegeta	Ryō Horikawa
Yamcha	Tōru Furuya
Kuririn	Mayumi Tanaka
Piccolo	Toshio Furukawa
Bulma	Hiromi Tsuru
Oolong	Naoki Tatsuta
Chi-Chi	Naoko Watanabe
Pu'ar	Naoko Watanabe
Trunks	Takeshi Kusao
Kame-Sen'nin	Hiroshi Masuoka
Videl	Yūko Minaguchi
Mr. Satan	Daisuke Gōri
Android 18	Miki Itō
Tarble	Masakazu Morita
Gure	Kumiko Nishihara
Abo	Yūsuke Numata
Kado	Kazunari Tanaka
Aka	Yasunori Masutani
Narrator	Jōji Yanami

== Development ==
The film was first announced in the April 21 issue of Weekly Shōnen Jump magazine. Stating that it would premiere along with One Piece: Romance Dawn Story at the Jump Super Anime Tour and visit ten Japanese cities to celebrate Shōnen Jump's 40th anniversary. In the June 9 issue of Weekly Shōnen Jump it was announced that the story would be based on an original concept by Dragon Ball creator Akira Toriyama, revisiting the comedic story-telling seen early in the series. The following August issue of V Jump revealed a small hint of the plot and that at least three new characters would appear.

== Distribution ==
The site Jumpland began streaming the film to both Japanese and English speaking viewers on their website on November 24, 2008, the Monday following the final stop on the Super Tour and was discontinued on January 31, 2009. Shortly before ending, it was announced that the film would be made available along with One Piece: Romance Dawn Story and Tegami Bachi: Light and Blue Night Fantasy on a triple feature DVD that would only be available though a mail-in offer exclusive to Japanese residents. The special was included as a bonus feature on the more widely available, limited edition home release of the 2013 film Dragon Ball Z: Battle of Gods on September 13, 2013.

In the February issue of V Jump it was announced that a manga adaptation illustrated by Naho Ōishi was in the works; it was published in the magazine's March 21 and April 21, 2009, issues. A film comic version was released in a single tankōbon volume on September 3, 2010.

== See also ==
- List of Dragon Ball films
