= Dragon Ball Super: Super Hero =

2022 film directed by Tetsuro Kodama

- Theatrical release poster
- Directed by: Tetsuro Kodama
- Screenplay by: Akira Toriyama
- Based on: Dragon Ball Super by Akira Toriyama
- Produced by: Norihiro Hayashida
- Starring: see below
- Edited by: Yuri Tamura
- Music by: Naoki Satō
- Production company: Toei Animation
- Distributed by: Toei Company, Ltd.
- Release date: June 11, 2022 (Japan)
- Running time: 99 minutes
- Country: Japan
- Language: Japanese
- Budget: $36 million
- Box office: $102.5 million

Dragon Ball Super: Super Hero (Japanese: ドラゴンボール超(スーパー) スーパーヒーロー, Hepburn: Doragon Bōru Sūpā Sūpā Hīrō) is a 2022 Japanese animated martial arts fantasy adventure film and the sequel to Dragon Ball Super: Broly (2018). It is the twenty-first animated feature film in the Dragon Ball franchise, the second to carry the Dragon Ball Super branding, the first to be produced mainly using CGI animation, as well as the fourth and final animated Dragon Ball film to be produced under the supervision of franchise creator Akira Toriyama before his death in March 2024. In the film, Piccolo and his former student Gohan head on a mission to save the world from the newly reformed Red Ribbon Army.

The film was originally set for release in Japan on April 22, 2022, but was instead released on June 11 due to a cyberattack at Toei Animation. Internationally, including the U.S. and the U.K., it was released on August 19, 2022, in both English dubbed and subtitled versions.

Dragon Ball Super: Super Hero received positive reviews from critics with praise for its nostalgia factor, characterization, fan service, action sequences and humor. The film grossed ¥13.8 billion (about US$102.5 million) worldwide, thus becoming the second-highest grossing Dragon Ball film to date.

== Plot ==
Commander Magenta, CEO of Red Pharmaceuticals, seeks to revive the Red Ribbon Army previously led by his late father Commander Red before it was ultimately destroyed by Goku over three decades prior. (Note: As depicted in the Red Ribbon Army arc in Dragon Ball) Magenta and his assistant Staff Officer Carmine seek to recruit Dr. Gero's surviving grandson Dr. Hedo, a superhero-obsessed mad scientist who was released from prison after serving a lengthy sentence for grave robbing. Despite his initial reservations, Hedo accepts the offer after Magenta convinces him that Bulma's Capsule Corporation is an evil organization, which is bent on world domination.

While Goku, Vegeta, and Broly are training under Whis on Beerus' planet, Piccolo is annoyed over Gohan wasting his potential while training the latter's daughter Pan. Piccolo is attacked by a Red Ribbon android Gamma 2, but manages to evade the android and follows him to the Red Ribbon Army's base. Piccolo disguises himself as a soldier to infiltrate a meeting, where he learns that Gamma 1 and 2 were created by Hedo to defeat Capsule Corporation and their superpowered allies. Hedo also reluctantly used his grandfather's schematics on Cell to create an improved version, known as Cell Max. Piccolo asks Bulma to make contact with Whis to alert Goku and Vegeta to the threat, but she is unable to reach him, so Piccolo asks Shenron to unlock his full potential, while Bulma uses the remaining two wishes for a butt lift and longer eyelashes. However, after Shenron leaves, Piccolo and Bulma realise they could've used the dragon balls to wish for Goku and Vegeta to be brought back to Earth. After getting into an argument with Bulma, Piccolo goes back to the Red Ribbon Army's base, where he learns of Magenta's scheme to kidnap Pan in order to lure Gohan into a trap.

Piccolo volunteers himself for the kidnapping and after Pan finishes school, he directs Pan to play along. Enraged upon learning of Pan's abduction, Gohan is finally pushed over the edge, getting to the point where he transforms into Super Saiyan and launches a full-scale assault on the Red Ribbon base. He then fights Gamma 1 in his normal and Super Saiyan forms and when he sees Piccolo pretending to hurt Pan (much to his shock and Gamma 2's anger), he transforms into his "Ultimate" form to overpower Gamma 1, while Piccolo faces Gamma 2 again. Piccolo's full potential manifests in a new form dubbed "Orange Piccolo" and finally pushes Gamma 2 over the edge to the point he starts yelling at him in anger. Both Gohan and Piccolo damage both their outfits and the Gammas' costumes and capes during their battles. Piccolo manages to convince Gamma 2 that Magenta is lying about Capsule Corporation and the Gammas realize that the true villains are the Red Ribbon Army, ending their relationship with the Red Ribbon Army and befriending Gohan and Piccolo. Carmine is knocked out by Pan after attempting to kill her, while a furious Magenta activates Cell Max before being killed by Hedo.

Cell Max emerges as a giant, rampaging monster. Dr. Hedo sends the call to the Gammas, who charge into the fight in rage. Bulma arrives with Goten, Trunks, Android 18 and Krillin as reinforcements. Gohan, Piccolo, Gamma 1, Gamma 2, Android 18, Goten, and Trunks battle Cell Max, throwing everything they got at Cell Max. Pan finally learns how to fly with the help of Krillin and Bulma despite getting scratches on herself and her school uniform. Goten and Trunks try to fuse into Gotenks, but their fusion technique is imperfect, resulting the return of Fat Gotenks. However, Gotenks does manage to crack Cell Max's skull, revealing that he does not have a regeneration ability like the original Cell. Krillin jumps into the fight, and Gamma 2 sacrifices himself in an attempt to kill Cell Max, but only succeeds in destroying Cell Max's left arm. After Piccolo is defeated by Cell Max, Gohan's inner rage manifests into a new "Beast" form and he fires a "Special Beam Cannon", killing Cell Max with Piccolo holding him in place with a little help of their friends. Gohan is reunited with his still scratched daughter Pan, while Bulma gives a repentant Hedo and Gamma 1 positions at Capsule Corporation. With Cell Max gone for good, Pan happily flies around everyone.

In a post-credits scene, Vegeta defeats Goku in a lengthy sparring match on Beerus' planet, by landing the match's final blow before collapsing himself.

== Voice cast ==
Character	Japanese	English
Gohan	Masako Nozawa	Kyle Hebert
Goku	Masako Nozawa	Sean Schemmel
Goten	Masako Nozawa	Robert McCollum
Piccolo	Toshio Furukawa	Christopher Sabat
Vegeta	Ryō Horikawa	Christopher Sabat
Gamma 1 (ガンマ1号, Ganma Ichigō)	Hiroshi Kamiya	Aleks Le
Gamma 2 (ガンマ2号, Ganma Nigō)	Mamoru Miyano	Zeno Robinson
Dr. Hedo (ドクター・ヘド, Dokutā Hedo)	Miyu Irino	Zach Aguilar
Magenta (マゼンタ, Mazenta)	Volcano Ōta	Charles Martinet
Carmine (カーマイン, Kāmain)	Ryōta Takeuchi	Jason Marnocha
Trunks	Takeshi Kusao	Eric Vale
Android 18	Miki Itō	Meredith McCoy
Broly	Bin Shimada	Johnny Yong Bosch
Kuririn	Mayumi Tanaka	Krillin
Kuririn	Mayumi Tanaka	Sonny Strait
Yajirobe	Mayumi Tanaka	Mike McFarland
Pan	Yūko Minaguchi	Jeannie Tirado
Videl	Yūko Minaguchi	Kara Edwards
Bulma	Aya Hisakawa	Monica Rial
Karin	Ken Uo	Korin
Karin	Ken Uo	Christopher Sabat
Dende	Aya Hirano	Justin Cook
Shenlong	Ryūzaburō Ōtomo	Shenron
Shenlong	Ryūzaburō Ōtomo	Christopher Sabat
Beerus	Kōichi Yamadera	Jason Douglas
Whis	Masakazu Morita	Ian Sinclair
Cheelai	Nana Mizuki	Erica Lindbeck
Lemo	Tomokazu Sugita	Bruce Carey
Cell Max	Norio Wakamoto	Dameon Clarke
Fat Gotenks	Masako Nozawa; Takeshi Kusao	Robert McCollum; Eric Vale

== Production ==
Production of Super Hero began before the release of Dragon Ball Super: Broly. It is the first film in the franchise to be produced largely in CGI, and the fourth to have heavy involvement from series creator Akira Toriyama, who provided the original concept and character designs. The use of CGI visuals was a decision made by Kodama, who is experienced with using them.

To differentiate the movie from prior films, Piccolo and Gohan were made protagonists (as opposed to Goku and Vegeta) and the Red Ribbon Army were brought back as villains. Toriyama personally designed the characters of the Red Ribbon Army, as well as their vehicles. Kodama explained the narrative would further explore human drama, most notably the idea of Gohan being a warrior and a scholar at the same time. Toriyama said that he wanted the plot to focus on the Gohan-Piccolo relationship, given Piccolo motivates Gohan to fight even more than his father, Goku.

The film introduces new transformations for Gohan and Piccolo. Gohan Beast (孫 悟飯・ビースト, Son Gohan Bīsuto), a form unique to Gohan, is based on the awakening of his powers ("the wild beast", per Toriyama) as a boy. Toriyama attempted to draw Gohan Beast with a "scary face", but finding this did not fit his character, gave him upturned hair as well. Orange Piccolo (オレンジ・ピッコロ, Orenji Pikkoro), which Toriyama considers Piccolo's first transformation, was made orange and extremely muscled to distinguish him from Piccolo's regular form.

Hiroshi Kamiya and Mamoru Miyano voice the androids Gamma 1 and Gamma 2. Miyu Irino voices their creator, Dr. Hedo. Kamiya was surprised by his casting, as he was a fan of Miyano, and also because the two would be a duo of villains. Despite the similarities of both androids, Kamiya looked forward to potential differences in their personalities, as it would bring an element of surprise to the narrative.

== Marketing ==
=== Promotion ===
A sequel to Dragon Ball Super: Broly was officially announced on May 9, 2021. At 2021's San Diego Comic-Con, a short clip of Goku with the film's logo was shown, revealing its title as Dragon Ball Super: Super Hero. Character designs for Piccolo, Pan, Krillin, Gamma 1, and Gamma 2 were also shown, as well as the design of Piccolo's home. The first trailer was released on October 7, 2021. The Japanese release date was announced with a new trailer at Jump Festa 2022.

=== Novelization ===
A novelization of the film written by Masatoshi Kusakabe was released on June 14, 2022. In its first week, it sold 3,946 copies, making it the seventh best-selling light novel in Japan.

== Release ==
=== Theatrical ===
The film was originally scheduled to be released in Japan on April 22, 2022, but it was postponed to June 11 after Toei Animation was affected by ransomware. The film was released in IMAX, 4DX, Dolby Cinema, and MX4D.

=== Distribution ===
The film is distributed in Japan by Toei Company. 20th Century Studios (formerly 20th Century Fox) had no involvement in the distribution of this film as a result of their Japanese division being absorbed into that of Disney's on September 1, 2020, following the latter's acquisition of the former, making this film the first to be released by Toei independently since Dragon Ball: The Path to Power (1996).

Crunchyroll distributed the film outside Japan with Sony Pictures Entertainment (through Sony Pictures Releasing). It was released in theaters worldwide in August and September 2022. This was the first Dragon Ball film to be distributed under the Crunchyroll brand after Sony Pictures acquired Crunchyroll in 2021 and merged it with Funimation in 2022.

=== Home media ===
Dragon Ball Super: Super Hero was released in North America by Crunchyroll on Blu-ray and DVD on March 14, 2023. The film features an English-language dub and original Japanese-language with English subtitles.

Crunchyroll also announced that the movie would become available for worldwide streaming on its service on July 12, 2023, with subtitles available in 11 languages and 9 languages with dubs.

== Reception ==
=== Box office ===
==== Japan ====
Dragon Ball Super: Super Hero topped the Japanese box office on its debut weekend, selling about 498,000 tickets and earning around ¥670 million (about $4.98 million). In its second weekend, the film's gross earned ¥300 million (about $2.2 million), placing it second behind Top Gun: Maverick. After 12 days of release, the film had sold over 1 million tickets. In its third weekend, the film remained in second place, earning about ¥232 million (about $1.71 million) from 166,000 tickets. It had cumulatively sold 1.21 million tickets and earned about ¥1.64 billion (about $12.11 million).

In its fourth weekend of release, Super Hero dropped to fourth place at the box office, earning about ¥155 million (about $1.13 million). In its fifth weekend, the film surpassed the ¥2 billion yen ($15.04 million) mark, although it also dropped to fifth place with earnings of ¥121 million (about $879,900). In its sixth weekend, Super Hero dropped to sixth place, earning about ¥72.4 million (about $523,900). In the film's seventh weekend in theaters, it earned about ¥44.3 million (about $324,600), dropping to 8th place.

Cumulatively, Dragon Ball Super: Super Hero has earned ¥2.3 billion (about US$17.03 million), surpassing The Quintessential Quintuplets Movie to become the fourth-highest grossing Japanese anime film of 2022.

==== Other territories ====
In the United States and Canada, Dragon Ball Super: Super Hero was initially projected to gross $13–15 million from 3,130 theaters during its opening weekend. After making $10.74 million on its first day, including $4.3 million from Thursday night previews, estimates were raised to $21–23 million. It went on to debut at $21 million, topping the box office. In its second weekend, the film earned $4.7 million, finishing fifth. Eventually, the film earned $38.1 million, becoming the fourth highest grossing anime film in the United States. It debuted at number one in Italy over the weekend of September 29–October 2, 2022, grossing €857,240. The film also topped the box office charts during its opening weekend in several Latin American countries, including Mexico, Argentina, Brazil, and Colombia.

=== Critical response ===
On the review aggregator website Rotten Tomatoes, 95% of 58 critics' reviews are positive, with an average rating of 7.2/10. The website's consensus reads: "Blending beautifully animated action with fresh character development, Dragon Ball Super: Super Hero is everything fans of the franchise will be looking for." Metacritic, which uses a weighted average, assigned the film a score of 65 out of 100, based on 12 critics, indicating "generally favorable" reviews. American audiences polled by PostTrak gave the film an 85% overall positive score, with 75% saying they would definitely recommend it, while Japanese audiences on Filmarks, the Japanese survey firm, gave Dragon Ball Super: Super Hero a ranking of 4.0 out of 5.0.

Richard Eisenbeis of Anime News Network gave Super Hero a B−. He noted its extensive callbacks to prior Dragon Ball moments and appreciated its exploration of Piccolo, who he considers a neglected character. He also praised the film's animation. However, Eisenbeis criticized Cell Max for being a lackluster villain. Cezary Jan Strusiewicz of Polygon described the movie as nostalgic, remarking on its accessibility to casual fans and people who have never watched Dragon Ball before. Unlike Eiseinbeis, Strusiewicz disliked the animation, which he found to be unusual for the series.
