= Chris Rager =

American voice actor

- Rager at Animate! Philadelphia in 2026
- Occupation: Voice actor
- Children: 1

Chris Rager is an American voice actor who works on a number of English versions of Japanese anime series. His major roles include Veldora Tempest in That Time I Got Reincarnated as a Slime, Mr. Satan in Dragon Ball, Will Powers in Ace Attorney, and Arlong in the Funimation dub of One Piece. In video games, he voices Mr. Torgue in the Borderlands series.

== Dubbing roles ==
=== Animated films and series English dubbing ===
List of English dubbing performances in animated films and series
Year	Title	Role	Notes	Source
2000	Dragon Ball Z: Bardock - The Father of Goku	Shugesh		
2000	Dragon Ball - Movie: Mystical Adventure	Major Metallitron		
2000–present	Dragon Ball series	Mr. Satan (Hercule), King Yemma, Goz, South Supreme Kai, Bacterian, Man-Wolf, Major Metallitron		
2002	YuYu Hakusho	Kibano		
2003	Lupin the 3rd: Dragon of Doom	President		
2003	Dragon Ball Z - Movie: Super Android 13!	Android 14		
2003	Dragonball - Movie: The Path to Power	Major Metallitron		
2004	Dragon Ball Z - Movie: Bojack Unbound	Mr. Satan		
2005	Baki the Grappler	Yuri Chakovsky		
2005	Lupin the 3rd: Island of Assassins	Chief		
2005	Dragon Ball Z - Movie: Bio-Broly	Mr. Satan		
2005	Dragon Ball Z - Movie: The World's Strongest	Kishime		
2006	Dragon Ball Z - Movie: Fusion Reborn	Mr. Satan, King Yemma		
2007	Baccano!	Gustavo Bagetta		
2007	BECK: Mongolian Chop Squad	Kenji Takano		
2008–present	One Piece	Arlong, Marshall D. Teach/Blackbeard (Season 17-present), Mr. Satan (Hercule) (eps. 590)	Funimation dub	
2009	Heaven's Lost Property	Matsuyama	Forte Eps. 3, 6	
2009	Kenichi: The Mightiest Disciple	Shinnosuke Tsuji		
2011–12	Last Exile: Fam, the Silver Wing	Olaf		
2012	Fafner: Dead Aggressor: Heaven and Earth	Kyousuke Mizoguchi		
2013	Toriko	Grinpatch		
2014	Gonna be the Twin-Tail!!	Draggildy		
2014	Dragon Ball Z: Battle of Gods	Mr. Satan		
2015	Show by Rock!!	Dagger Morse		
2015	Mikagura School Suite	Kyoma Kuzuryu		
2015	Ghost in the Shell: Arise	Ibachi		
2015	Ben-To	Tadaaki Endo		
2015	Ghost in the Shell: The New Movie	Ibachi		
2015–16	Assassination Classroom	Gakuho Asano		
2016	Danganronpa 3: The End of Hope's Peak High School	Great Gozu		
2016	Servamp	Tetsu Sendagaya		
2016	Orange	Classic Literature Teacher		
2016	Shimoneta: A Boring World Where the Concept of Dirty Jokes Doesn't Exist	Zenjuro Okuma, Additional Voices (Ep. 7)		
2016–25	My Hero Academia	Ken Ishiyama/Cementoss		
2017	Gosick	Knight	Ep. 18	
2018	Ace Attorney	Will Powers		
2018	Attack on Titan	Captain Carsten		
2018	Black Clover	Baro	Ep. 31	
2018–22	Overlord	Zenberu Gugu	Seasons 2–4; Funimation dubbed	
2018–present	That Time I Got Reincarnated as a Slime	Veldora Tempest		
2019	One Piece: Stampede	Marshall D. Teach/Blackbeard	Succeeding Cole Brown	
2020	By the Grace of the Gods	Ryoma Takebayashi (adult)		
2021	Vinland Saga	Gratianus		
2021	Banished from the Hero's Party	Danan LeBeau		
2022	Spy × Family	Bill Watkins' Father	Episode 10	
2023	A Returner's Magic Should Be Special	Doneve		
2024	Bartender: Glass of God	Taisho		
2024	Berserk of Gluttony	Hado		
2024	Nina the Starry Bride	King		
2024	A Journey Through Another World: Raising Kids While Adventuring	Vector		
2025	Failure Frame	Schweitz		

== Filmography ==
=== Video games ===
List of voice performances in video games
Year	Title	Role	Notes	Source
2004	Seven Samurai 20XX	Additional voices		
2005	Spikeout: Battle Street	Additional voices		
2012–2013	Borderlands 2	Mister Torgue	Mr. Torgue's Campaign of Carnage, Tiny Tina's Assault on Dragon Keep and The Horrible Hunger of the Ravenous Wattle Gobbler DLCs	
2014	Borderlands: The Pre-Sequel	Mister Torgue		
2019	Borderlands 3	Mister Torgue		
2022	Tiny Tina's Wonderlands	Mister Torgue		

=== Animation ===
List of voice performances in animation
Year	Title	Role	Notes	Source
2017	Death Battle	McGruff the Crime Dog	Episode: Smokey Bear VS McGruff the Crime Dog	
