= Beerus =

Fictional character from Dragon Ball

- Dragon Ball character
- Official design of Beerus by Akira Toriyama
- First appearance: Dragon Ball Z: Battle of Gods (2013)
- Created by: Akira Toriyama
- Voiced by: Japanese: Kōichi Yamadera; English: Jason Douglas (Funimation/Crunchyroll); John DeMita (Bang Zoom!)

In-universe information
- Title: God of Destruction of Universe 7
- Family: Champa (twin brother)
- Relatives: East Supreme Kai (life linked)
- Abilities: Superhuman strength, speed, agility, reflexes, durability, endurance, stamina and healing; Flight; Energy sensing; Energy projection; Energy absorption; Telepathy; Telekinesis; Hakai/Destruction

Beerus, the God of Destruction (Japanese: 破壊神ビルス, Hepburn: Hakaishin Birusu) is a fictional character from the Dragon Ball franchise created by Akira Toriyama. He made his debut appearance in the 2013 film Dragon Ball Z: Battle of Gods serving as the main antagonist and returned in the 2015 sequel Dragon Ball Z: Resurrection 'F' in a supporting role, as well as in the anime series Dragon Ball Super. He is a deity known as a God of Destruction and resembles a purple sphynx cat wearing traditional Egyptian clothing and ornaments, whose occupation is to maintain balance in the universe by destroying, in contrast to the Supreme Kais who create and preserve.

It has been stated by Whis that Beerus is capable of destroying entire universes. Often seen destroying planets at a whim, Beerus' two sole desires are, being quite a gourmet, enjoying food he likes to eat, and fighting opponents whom he considers as worthy. The latter ultimately leads him to look for the Super Saiyan God, which turns out to be one of the Saiyans now living on Earth. Eventually, Goku, with the help of the other Saiyans, transforms into the Super Saiyan God and fights Beerus, just to be defeated by the God of Destruction. Having enjoyed the match, Beerus spares both Goku and the Earth, saying that Goku was the second strongest opponent he ever faced; the first being his caretaker and martial arts teacher, Whis.

== Conception and creation ==
The development of Beerus' character first started sometime in 2011. His name and voice actors, along with the film's poster, were officially revealed in December 2012 in Weekly Shōnen Jump's first issue of 2013; Kōichi Yamadera would provide the character's voice. The film poster displays Super Saiyan Goku combating the God of Destruction Beerus, with Whis floating showered in light in the background. The character was in the initial draft of the Battle of Gods, though Toriyama notes that Beerus was changed completely despite his liking of the concept.

The name "Beerus" was taken from the word "virus", though Toriyama mistakenly believed the word meant "beer", which began the naming pun used for Whis during production of Battle of Gods, and later future Gods of Destruction and attendants after alcoholic beverages.

In the following week's issue, he revealed that Beerus's design is based on a cat and his clothes based on Egyptian garments. Beerus's design was partially based on a Cornish Rex cat that had lived with Toriyama at the time of design work, the cat miraculously recovering from an illness and the veterinarian joked that it was demonic. Toei initially had the character to resemble a lizard, Toriyama changing it entirely to a cat. Beerus was planned to use either a spoon or fork in combatting the heroes, the idea being overturned when Tadayoshi Yamamuro, the animation director on Battle of Gods, considered it difficult for Beerus to fight that way and made the suggestion of chopsticks instead.

The April issue of V Jump teased about a new Super Saiyan transformation being in the film, titled "Super Saiyan God", saying that 39 years ago, the Oracle Fish told Beerus that the Super Saiyan God would appear before him, and that this forms the basis for the beginning of the movie's story. In Weekly Shōnen Jump issue #14 of 2013, Toriyama said that the plot for Battle of Gods began two years ago with ideas for the God of Destruction and Super Saiyan God, and that he got deeply involved in the story in order to keep it in-line with the series' original tone so kids could enjoy it.

=== Voice actors ===
Beerus is voiced by Kōichi Yamadera in all Japanese Dragon Ball media.

In the English Funimation dub, Beerus is voiced by Jason Douglas. Douglas interpreted voice director Chris Sabat as believing Beerus's voice was "similar in tone" to Douglas' prior role in Borderlands 2 as Krieg. Douglas found out he had earned the role through his agent. In the Bang Zoom! Entertainment English language dub, produced for Toonami Asia and is exclusive to Southeast Asia and India, he is voiced by John DeMita.

== Abilities ==
Beerus possesses power capable of easily destroying universes. During his first fight with Super Saiyan God Goku, the clashing of the two's fists created ripples which traveled through the macrocosmos of Universe 7, and was said to be able to destroy the universe if it continued. It was also revealed after the fight that Beerus was holding back a considerably significant amount of his power and had an ability to neutralize any mortal's energy. In Chapter 28 of the Dragon Ball Super manga, Beerus is shown to have the imperfect version of Ultra Instinct, which was showcased as he dodged the attacks of every other God of Destruction. Some of Beerus's unique attacks include Sphere of Destruction (ビルス玉, Birusu Dama), where he creates a small sun-like ball of energy in between his hands, raises his arms, and quickly enlarges the ball before launching it, along with Destruction before Creation, where he surrounds himself in an aura resembling a sun prior to releasing an energy wave. Beerus's strongest technique, Hakai (破壊; lit. 'Destruction') can be used to completely obliterate objects and entities within the universe. Hakai is able to instantly destroy the body and even souls of mortals and low-tier Gods, which can be seen in action when Beerus uses the technique on Zamasu and the ghost of Dr. Mashirito. Although the technique is first seen being used by Beerus, all Gods of Destruction can utilize the ability. Similarly to other Gods of Destruction and Supreme Kais, Beerus's life is linked to the East Supreme Kai, where if one dies then so will the other. This amounts to a weakness given East Supreme Kai's vast inferiority in strength to Beerus. Due to the East Supreme Kai being killed in the alternate timeline, while assisting Trunks in facing Dabura, the version of Beerus that exists there dies during his sleep.

== Appearances ==
Beerus awakens from a 39-year sleep and goes in search of a Super Saiyan God whom he saw in his dream. His search brings him to Goku, whom he easily defeats despite his opponent being in Super Saiyan 3 form. Beerus then reaches Earth to inquire about the Super Saiyan God myth from Vegeta, expressing disappointment in him, yet participates in Bulma's birthday party to enjoy Earth's cuisine. Beerus is mostly calm until Majin Buu refuses to share the remaining pudding with him, resulting in the furious Beerus effortlessly defeating Buu, Gotenks, Gohan, Android 18, Piccolo, and Tenshinhan in combat. After defeating Vegeta upon provoking him into retaliating with a backhand to Bulma, Beerus is convinced by Goku to spare Earth momentarily to give them time to find a way of making a Super Saiyan God appear. The group uses the Dragon Balls to summon Shenron, who reveals to the group that the Super Saiyan God is created when five pure-hearted Saiyans channel their hearts into a sixth Saiyan. Unfortunately, only five Saiyans exist on planet Earth, but Videl reveals that she is pregnant, with the unborn child counting as the sixth Saiyan to complete the ritual. The Saiyans and Videl perform the ritual, transforming Goku into a Super Saiyan God. Beerus duels him in a battle that affects the entire universe. But even after Goku loses and his Super Saiyan God power fades, Beerus notes Goku's remaining power. Later, he decides to spare him and the Earth, pretending to fall into a deep sleep.

Beerus is retroactively established, over the course of the Dragon Ball Super series, to be involved in past events in the Dragon Ball universe which are previously left unexplained or lacking in context. For example, Beerus is revealed to be the one who sealed Old Supreme Kai into the Z Sword and destroyed North Kaiō's planet, with only the small planet where he now lives remaining, both acts being out of anger over squabbles. He also instigated Frieza to destroy Planet Vegeta after he felt disrespected by King Vegeta.

During Frieza's resurrection and subsequent battle with the heroes, Beerus observes the fight and assures a worried Frieza that he will not get involved in his fight with the Saiyans, although he warns the tyrant to stay away from his ice cream. After Goku defeats Frieza, Beerus sets up a tournament between his Universe 7 and his twin brother Champa's Universe 6. After Universe 7 wins, Beerus wishes for the population of Universe 6's Earth to be restored. Beerus, Whis, and Goku travel to Universe 10 to meet with Gowasu and Zamasu after gaining a clue about Goku Black's identity; when Zamasu is discovered to be planning to kill Gowasu, Beerus confronts and erases him. Beerus then destroys the already deceased Dr. Mashirito. Beerus tries to prevent Goku from using a button to summon the Omni-King, which sets up the Tournament of Power. After the tournament, Beerus confronts the Omni-King when he asks Goku about his plans and then leaves his sight in fear.

In the Dragon Ball Super: Broly movie, Beerus only takes a nap in Bulma's vacation place before looking after her daughter while she helps Goku's group find the Seven-Star Dragon Ball.

In Dragon Ball Super: Super Hero, he wakes up from a nap to find that Broly, Cheelai, and Lemo had moved to his planet to avoid Frieza's counterwrath, and decides to let them stay after tasting Lemo's cooking. He also becomes infatuated with Cheelai, much to Whis' amusement.

=== Appearances in other media ===
Beerus has appeared in several Dragon Ball games, the first being Dragon Ball Heroes. In the 2015 game Dragon Ball Xenoverse, Beerus pretends to be possessed by Demigra before revealing that gods are immune to his powers. Beerus then engages him in battle with the player, and after besting him, he fights the player and Trunks with Whis in a test. Beerus allows the player to defeat Demigra after he passes, staying awake long enough to see the player overcome Demigra in battle. Beerus also serves as a mentor, teaching his moves to the player. In the 2016 sequel Dragon Ball Xenoverse 2, Beerus becomes angered by the bad taste of the pudding made by the Supreme Kai of Time, causing Whis and the player to have to subdue him. Beerus and Whis leave Earth while Frieza is attacking it when contacted by the Supreme Kai of Time, allowing Frieza to destroy Earth without Whis' prevention and the pair discovering they have been deceived by Towa. Beerus and the player fight Whis before Beerus and Whis depart from the main story. Beerus also appears as a playable character in Dragon Ball FighterZ. English YouTuber and rapper KSI released a song in late 2018 called "Beerus". It was later found to be the second single on the April 2019 collaborative album "New Age" by KSI and Randolph.

== Reception ==
Reception to Lord Beerus has been mixed to positive. Reviewer Nathan Farrugla saw Beerus as being "an interesting villain", citing his nature being unpredictable and varying motives. Jason Douglas' voice work as Beerus in the English Funimation dub was also praised. IGN found Beerus to be similar to previous villains in the franchise in being "over-the-top". Theron Martin of Anime News Network found the fight between Goku and Beerus to be lacking in distinctiveness.
