= Kara Edwards =

American voice actress

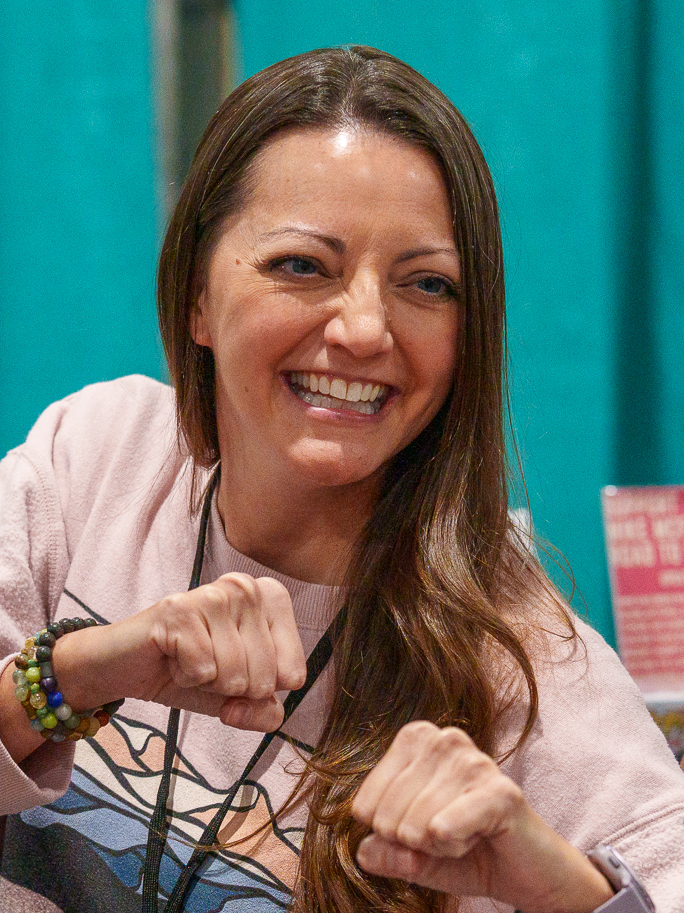
- Edwards in 2025
- Born: Lubbock, Texas, U.S.
- Other names: Janét Mason; Alexia Sabanbeard; Carol Sekiguchi
- Occupations: Voice actress, radio personality
- Spouses: Chris Suchan(divorced); Zach Bolton
- Children: 1
- Website: karaedwards.com

Kara Edwards is an American voice actress working for the English versions of Japanese anime. She is also well known in the Charlotte, North Carolina, area for her past career as a radio host.

== Career ==
Edwards began her broadcast career with a job at Radio Disney out of Dallas, Texas, the fall after she graduated from high school. She interned for eight months before landing the more permanent jobs of writer, producer, voice actress and children's voice director.

In July 1997, she became co-host of the Squeege and Kara Show on syndicated Radio Disney with friend and fellow voice actor Kyle Hebert.

She did voice-over work in commercials for companies such as Blockbuster, Levi Strauss & Co., and Clinique. During the latter part of her Radio Disney tenure, Edwards voiced in a number of English-language versions of Japanese anime series for Funimation. Her most notable voice role as the child version of Goten and Videl in Dragon Ball Z. In March 2002, Edwards was hired as a producer and occasional "sidekick" for the Sander Walker in the Morning radio show on WSSS 104.7 FM in Charlotte, North Carolina.

She stayed in this position until October 31, 2003. After that morning's airing finished, the entire Sander Walker show cast and crew were informed that WSSS was switching its format to Christmas music around the clock and subsequently were all terminated. Edwards was not off the airwaves for long, however. In February 2004, she became the co-host of the Jeff Roper Morning Show syndicated from WSOC 103.7 FM, also out of Charlotte.

In January 2005, Jeff Roper left WSOC to take a morning job at WWNU 92 FM in Columbia, South Carolina. WSOC management assigned Edwards to take up co-hosting duties with Rob Tanner as part of the new Tanner in the Morning show. The show's mix of regional humor and parodies made it one of the higher-rated morning shows in the Charlotte area's country music radio market and Edwards continued her co-hosting duties for nearly two years.

Although Edwards enjoyed her radio work, she began to feel strongly about voice acting. In August 2006, Edwards and fellow voice actors Sean Schemmel, Christopher Sabat, and Jason Liebrecht attended the Wizard World Comics Convention in Chicago, Illinois. When Dragon Ball fans waited in line up to five hours to get her autograph, Edwards began seriously considering making voice acting her full-time job.

"I decided then, you know what? This is my passion in life. I always thought radio was the place I should be and pursued it and pursued it. Now I think this is the place I should be."

A few weeks later, Edwards brought her feelings to WSOC management during a monthly performance strategy meeting and told them of her desire to go into voice acting full-time and leave her position as co-host. WSOC and the Tanner show staff accepted Edwards's decision and her departure was handled amicably.

Since then, Edwards has resided in Dallas doing commercial and documentary voice-over, but occasionally returns to Funimation to reprise her Dragon Ball roles and other anime.

== Personal life ==
Edwards met Charlotte CBS affiliate WBTV meteorologist Chris Suchan; they married in April 2006. They were later divorced. She gave birth to a child in August 2015.

In 2019, Edwards alleged that voice actor Vic Mignogna had sexually harassed her, citing that he had propositioned her in 2008 and 2010 without her consent. She initially revealed the allegations anonymously through io9 but later testified against him during his lawsuit.

In November 2020, Edwards married voice actor Zach Bolton.

== Filmography ==
=== Anime dubbing ===
- .hack//Quantum – Asta
- The 100 Girlfriends Who Really, Really, Really, Really, Really Love You – Shiori Yoshimoto (3 episodes)
- A Certain Magical Index series – Vento
- A Certain Scientific Railgun series – Tsuzuri Tesso, Febrie
- Aharen-san Is Indecipherable (season 2) – Riku
- Aquarion Evol – Aika
- Aquarion Logos – Okazaki
- Azur Lane – Yorktown
- Ben-To – Kyo Sawagi
- Boogiepop and Others – Additional Voices
- The Brilliant Healer's New Life in the Shadows – Til
- Cat Planet Cuties – Arisa Oshiro (credited as Janét Mason)
- Chaos;Head – Kozue Orihara
- Chrome Shelled Regios – Countia Varmon Farness
- The Daily Life of a Middle-Aged Online Shopper in Another World – Cineria
- Dance in the Vampire Bund – Nanami Shinonome (credited as Janét Mason)
- Danganronpa: The Animation – Chihiro Fujisaki, Alter Ego
- Darker than Black: Gemini of the Meteor – Mina Hazuki
- Dragon Ball Daima – Goten, Gotenks
- Dragon Ball Z – Goten, Gotenks (Goten-half), Videl (as well as Kai: The Final Chapters series), various
- Dragon Ball Super – Goten, Gotenks, Videl
- Fairy Tail – Ultear Milkovich (Child, Ep. 116)
- Fruits Basket (2019) – Kana Soma
- Guilty Crown – Kyo (Eps. 4–6), Miyabi Herikawa (Eps. 16, 18)
- Haganai – Akari Fujibayashi (Ep. 2)
- Heaven's Lost Property series – Nymph
- Hetalia: The Beautiful World – Female Russia
- High School DxD – Aika Kiryuu
- Hello Kitty: Super Style! (2022–2024) – Pinky and Zing
- I Shall Survive Using Potions! – Eunice
- I'm in Love with the Villainess – Lene
- Is This a Zombie? series – Eucliwood Hellscythe (Fantasy Voice, 3 episodes)
- Kaguya-sama: Love Is War – Moeha Fujiwara
- Kamisama Kiss 2 – Mizutama
- Last Exile -Fam, The Silver Wing – Teddy
- Linebarrels of Iron – Yuriko Moritsugu (Ep. 21)
- My Hero Academia – Kaoruko Awata
- New Saga – Ceraia
- Nobunagun – Watanabe
- Ōkami-san and her Seven Companions – Himeno Shirayuki (Eps. 9–10)
- One Piece – Lil Accino, Lily Enstomach (Eps. 590)
- Plunderer – Greengrocer Lady (Eps. 4, 22, 24)
- The Rolling Girls – Banko (Eps. 3, 5)
- The Sacred Blacksmith – Patty Baldwin
- Sekirei series – Chiho Hidaka (credited as Janét Mason)
- Shakugan no Shana – Brigid (season 3)
- Shiki – Shihori Maeda (Ep. 21.5)
- SoltyRei – Celica Yayoi
- Soul Eater – Fairy (Ep. 9)
- Soul Eater Not! – Eternal Feather
- SSSS.Dynazenon – Mujina
- Strike Witches 2 – Junko Takei (Eps. 1, 3, 12)
- Toilet-Bound Hanako-kun – Sakura Nanamine
- The Villainess Is Adored by the Prince of the Neighbor Kingdom – Akari
- YuYu Hakusho – Murugu
- YU-NO: A Girl Who Chants Love at the Bound of the World – Kaori Asakura

=== Film ===
- Dragon Ball Z: Broly – Second Coming – Goten, Videl
- Dragon Ball Z: Bio-Broly – Goten
- Dragon Ball Z: Fusion Reborn – Goten, Videl
- Dragon Ball Z: Wrath of the Dragon – Goten, Videl
- Dragon Ball Z: Battle of Gods – Goten, Videl
- Dragon Ball Z: Resurrection 'F' – Videl
- Dragon Ball Super: Broly – Goten
- Dragon Ball Super: Super Hero - Videl
- Mass Effect: Paragon Lost – Christine

=== Live-action ===
- Barney & Friends – Riff (Singing)
- Victorious – Woman

=== Video games ===
- Battleborn – Shayne
- Borderlands 3 – Adi
- Dragon Ball series – Goten (Child), Videl, various
- The Gunstringer – Additional Voices
- Orcs Must Die! 3 – Kelsey
- SMITE – Athena, Aphrodite (Beach Babe)
- Squinkies – Princess
- Squinkies 2: Adventure Mall – Narrator
