= Majin Buu =

Fictional character from Dragon Ball

- Dragon Ball character
- Three different appearances of Majin Buu, as drawn by Akira Toriyama
- First appearance: Dragon Ball chapter #460: "Majin Buu Appears?!", March 1, 1994 (Weekly Shōnen Jump 1994)
- Created by: Akira Toriyama
- Voiced by: Japanese: Kōzō Shioya; Shiho Amuro (Mini; Dragon Ball Daima); English (Funimation dubs): Josh Martin (as Fat/Good and Kid Buu); Justin Cook (as Super and Evil Buu); English (Ocean Group dubs): Scott McNeil (as Fat/Good Buu); Brian Dobson (as Super and Kid Buu), Corby Proctor (in GT); English (Bang Zoom! dub): Spike Spencer

In-universe information
- Race: Majin
- Family: Marba (creator); Uub (reincarnation); Mr. Satan (caretaker)
- Abilities: Super strength; Super speed, agility, reflexes; Stamina; Healing; Flight; Energy sensing; Energy projection; Energy absorption; Durability; Telepathy; Telekinesis; Stretching; Morphing; Multiplication; Transmutation; Teleportation

Majin Buu (Japanese: 魔人ブウ, Hepburn: Majin Bū), generally spelled Majin Boo in subtitles of the Japanese anime, and rendered as Boo the Djinn in the Viz Media manga, is a fictional character and one of the main antagonists in the Dragon Ball series by Akira Toriyama. He made his debut appearance in chapter #460 "Majin Buu Appears?!", first published in Weekly Shōnen Jump magazine on March 1, 1994. Majin Buu has had multiple origins throughout the series. In Dragon Ball Z, he is explained as being a creation of the evil warlock Bibidi, who is unleashed by his son, Babidi, onto Earth. Alternatively, in a later interview, Toriyama states that Buu had existed outside of Bibidi and that Bibidi simply knew how to summon him. The 2024–2025 anime series Dragon Ball Daima reveals that Buu was created by the Demon World witch Marba when she was commissioned by Bibidi.

Majin Buu was sealed away by Bibidi and brought to Earth; however, while Buu was sealed away, Bibidi was killed, and Buu remained sealed away and dormant. During the events of Dragon Ball, he is revived by Bibidi's son Babidi to continue his father's plan to conquer the entire universe.

== Creation and design ==
Manga author Akira Toriyama stated that when creating a villain in Dragon Ball, he would try to make them different from any that had come before. Although it was difficult and he was usually not entirely pleased with the results, he thinks he did achieve this with Majin Buu. The Shenlong Times issue #2, a bonus pamphlet given to some buyers of the Daizenshuu 2: Story Guide guidebook, says that Majin Buu was modeled after Toriyama's editor at the time, Fuyuto Takeda. Buu, Bibidi and Babidi take their names from the song "Bibbidi-Bobbidi-Boo" in the Walt Disney movie Cinderella. Toriyama stated that the fight between Buu and Gotenks was fun to draw because he was able to come up with odd techniques in "the spirit of gag manga".

Majin Buu has several different forms, each with a different appearance and personality; however, all are pink creatures (except for Pure Evil Majin Buu, which is dark grey) with an antenna on their head and several pores on both sides of their heads, arms, chest, and vertebrae. They have a rubbery body (again, except for Pure Evil Majin Buu) that can regenerate instantly from any wound, separate parts of it from themselves and control them independently, and can even completely restore themselves from vapor. Buu can also heal damaged beings, and can absorb other organisms by enveloping them with his body or eating them, the latter done by using his signature attack that turns people into food such as candy.

When first introduced, he is rotund and wears gloves, boots, a vest, and a cape. His appearance, magical powers, how he appeared from his ball, longevity, and how he is summoned to Earth by an evil warlock using the life-force of his victims are all somewhat genie-esque, an aspect further implied in the Japanese word "Majin" in his name, which can read as "Djinn", which led to Viz Media rendering his name as Boo the Djinn for the English manga release. His trousers, in all forms he takes, bear the same "M" symbol like many other characters associated with Babidi in this part of the manga; whether this is short for Buu's title of "Majin", Babidi's title of "Madoshi" in the original Japanese or something else is unclear. In a 2007 interview printed in Shonen Jump, Akira Toriyama stated that Buu's design was inspired by adaptations of One Thousand and One Nights (Arabian Nights) that he watched as a child.

Majin Buu's manner is very naive and childlike, taking joy in fighting and scaring people. Throughout the series, he is always referred to by either Majin Buu or simply Buu, no matter what form he is in. However, each form has been given its own name in guidebooks, video games, or by fans to distinguish between them. The first plumper form seen is referred to as "Innocent Majin Buu" (無邪気な魔人ブウ, Mujakina Majin Bū). When Buu expels the evil inside him, it takes on a taller and much skinnier, frail form referred to as "Pure Evil Majin Buu" (魔人ブウ 純粋悪, Majin Bū Junsui Aku). When this Buu absorbs the fat one, he transforms into a muscular version of himself, referred to as "Evil Majin Buu" (魔人ブウ 悪, Majin Bū Aku), with English media referring to him as "Super Buu". Personality-wise, Super Buu is more intelligent than Innocent Buu and is described as "pure rage".

This intelligence allows him to plan for the opportunity to absorb Gotenks and Piccolo, and later Gohan. After absorbing the first two, his antennae lengthen, forming five full fingers. Evil Buu gained Piccolo's intellect and momentarily wore Gotenks's vest and strength before his latter victim's fusion wore off. This form is sometimes called "Buutenks" by fans. He then absorbed Gohan, gaining his power while wearing his dōgi top and undershirt. Again, fans often refer to this form as "Buuhan." The last form shown, referred to as Kid Buu or "Pure Majin Buu" (魔人ブウ 純粋, Majin Bū Junsui), is actually Buu's original form. Super Buu was forced into that state after the fat Buu was completely removed from his body, along with Gohan, Goten, Trunks, and Piccolo. While a child-like version of Evil Buu, Kid Buu is completely feral and animalistic, living only to destroy and is called "evil incarnate". Daizenshuu 2: Story Guide refers to him as the "strongest enemy in the universe". Even after Kid Buu is killed, the fat Majin Buu lives on Earth as the completely kindhearted Mr. Buu (ミスター・ブウ, Misutā Bū). In the anime, Buu's "Evil" and "Pure" forms' designs differ from the manga in that they both always have five fingers. Goku wishes for Buu to be reincarnated as a good person on Earth, so he's reborn as a boy named Uub (ウーブ, Ūbu), who meets Goku during a tournament at the end of Dragon Ball Z.

== Voice actors ==
In Japan, Buu and all his forms are voiced by Kōzō Shioya in all media, with the only exception being in Dragon Ball Daima, where a mini version of Majin Buu was voiced by Shiho Amuro. He said he looked at the character as a self-centered three-year-old. Even through all the different forms of the character, Shioya explained that he tried not to deviate too far from the personality of the original while subtly showing that he changed form. Buu would subsequently be voiced by Mitsuaki Kanuka in Dragon Ball: Sparking! ZERO's Super Limit-Breaking NEO update following Kōzō Shioya's death in January 2026.

In the Funimation dub, Josh Martin voices Fat and Kid Buu, while Justin Cook voices Evil and Super Buu. Meanwhile, in the Ocean Group dubs, Fat Buu is voiced by Scott McNeil, while Evil, Super, and Kid Buu are voiced by Brian Dobson.

== Powers and abilities ==
Being the final villain faced by the protagonists in the original Dragon Ball Z series, and the franchise at the time, Buu is the most powerful of them all, possessing vast superhuman strength, speed, and reflexes beyond comprehension. He can channel his inner ki energy for devastating offensive techniques capable of destroying planets or star systems.

Buu also holds the unique ability of being able to transform objects or living things into chocolate or other sweet foods, which he then consumes to satiate himself, using the antenna on his head, and he is shown to be capable of magically altering an object's appearance.

Buu is also able to instantly recover and regenerate from severe trauma, dismemberment, and even combustion at a sub-molecular level, and heal wounds from other people. His body is soft but flexible, able to stretch his limbs and any part of his body to indefinite lengths, as well as changing shape into whatever he desires.

He is also capable of detaching a large part of his body for various purposes, like ensnaring his targets like a lasso rope, and making clones of himself. This also allows him to absorb other people to obtain their power. Buu can instantly emulate techniques used on him, launching Goku's signature Kamehameha many times, and can use the Instant Transmission, in his original form. Buu is also revealed to possess godly ki after absorbing the two Supreme Kai, granting him a tremendous surge in power, retaining it after reverting to his pure state.

== Appearances ==
=== In Dragon Ball ===
Before the events of Dragon Ball, as revealed in Dragon Ball Daima, Majin Buu came into being when Bibidi commissioned the Demon World witch Marba to create a being that existed "solely to slaughter and destroy." Within a few years, taking credit as Buu's creator, they destroyed hundreds of planets. Buu later reached the world of the Kais where he killed two of the five Supreme Kais who govern the universe. Their leader, the Grand Supreme Kai, and his apprentice, the Southern Supreme Kai, attempt to fight Buu despite being weakened from dealing with a separate threat earlier. Buu manages to absorb the two Supreme Kais, but the absorbed Grand Supreme Kai's influence dulls the Majin's destructive nature and turned him into his current form. But Buu was still too ferocious even for Bibidi to control, resulting in the Majin being temporarily sealed and moved to their next target, Earth. But the last surviving Supreme Kai, Shin, kills Bibidi to prevent Buu from being freed and remain sealed away on Earth. In the present day, Bibidi's cloned son, Babidi, makes it his goal to revive Buu, which Shin intends to prevent by killing him. He underestimates the power of Goku and Vegeta, and their spent energy results in Majin Buu's quick revival. When Babidi threatens to re-seal him, Buu begins to obey his orders and destroys and kills everything and everyone in sight to get Piccolo, Trunks and Goten to come out of hiding. That is until Goku asks him why he lets Babidi boss him around, leading to Buu killing him, however he continues his mischief and destruction, unaware that what he is doing is wrong.

Majin Buu attacks humans, destroying nearly all of the world's population, then builds a house by converting people into clay. He is resting in his house when Mr. Satan befriends him while waiting for an opening to kill him. The friendship coupled with the affection from a dog he healed, has Buu resolve not to kill anymore when two civilians shoot the dog and then Mr. Satan. Buu heals them, but the evil aspect of his personality takes advantage of Buu's rage to manifest out of his body, transforming into a taller and much skinnier Evil Buu, who attacks the now weaker Good Buu. Evil Buu reflects Good Buu's attack, turning his benign counterpart into chocolate and eating him to become whole and transform into a more dangerous Majin Buu, known as Super Buu. Super Buu quickly senses Piccolo, Trunks, and Goten and goes to them, demanding Gotenks fight him. Gohan then arrives and clearly has the upper-hand over Super Buu, but Super Buu absorbs Gotenks and later Piccolo. Now stronger than Gohan, Super Buu, knowing that there is a time limit on Gotenks's fusion, planned ahead and can absorb Gohan as well. However, Goku and Vegeta fuse into Vegito, but, despite being powerful enough to defeat him, they intentionally get absorbed by Super Buu to enter his body. Though the Potara Fusion ran its course, Goku and Vegeta manage to retrieve Gohan, Piccolo, Goten, and Trunks before they completely separate the absorbed Fat Buu from Super Buu.

The removal of Fat Buu causes Super Buu to revert to his original form, known as Kid Buu, no longer deluded by his benign counterpart, as he immediately obliterates the Earth. Kid Buu then follows Goku and Vegeta to the World of the Kais, where, after a battle with Goku, he is stalled by Vegeta and a freed Fat Buu, so that Goku can finish him off with a Super Spirit Bomb made with energy from the people on the newly resurrected Earth. Good Buu goes on to live with Mr. Satan on Earth as Mr. Buu after the Dragon Balls erase the people of Earth's memories about him. As wished by Goku, Kid Buu is reincarnated as a child named Uub, whom Goku takes as his apprentice ten years later.

=== In Dragon Ball Super ===
Buu encounters Beerus during Bulma's birthday party, and quickly provoked the deity into a rampage after he childishly refused to share some pudding dessert. Buu is later selected to participate in the Universe 7 team's tournament with Universe 6. He is disqualified before the tournament begins by falling asleep during the exam. Buu agrees to fight with Goku and Gohan in the Universe Survival tournament, being matched against Universe 9's Basil. Buu is initially overwhelmed, though he becomes enraged over seeing Mr. Satan injured by the battle collaterally and quickly overpowers Basil. After consuming a drug that increases his power, Basil seems to gain the upper hand on Buu with a buffer form coinciding with his attacks; however, Buu is unaffected by the attacks and defeats Basil with a Kamehameha wave. Buu then heals Mr. Satan. After the mini-tournament, Buu begins to train on Earth for the Tournament of Power. Due to the intensity of his training, Buu gains a slimmer and toned body and spars against Goku, beating him. Alas, also due to the intensity of his training, Buu falls asleep and will not wake for 3 months, forcing him to miss the Tournament of Power. Frieza is temporarily resurrected to fight in Buu's place.

Shortly after the events of the Tournament of Power and Dragon Ball Super: Broly, Buu is kidnapped by the Galactic Patrol and taken to their headquarters alongside Goku and Vegeta. Merus, the Galactic Patrol's #1 elite patrolman, explains that an evil criminal named Moro has escaped from galactic prison an the Galactic Patrol need the Grand Supreme Kai, revealing that he and the Southern Supreme Kai sealed Moro before they got absorbed by Buu. As Goku and Vegeta went away to confront Moro, Buu is taken to New Namek where the Grand Supreme Kai's mind subverts Buu and uses the Majin's body as his own. The Grand Supreme Kai reveals he cannot seal Moro away since he lost his god ki, which Kid Buu possessed when he fully separated from Buu. For the remainder of the arc, the Grand Supreme Kai remained dominant over Buu's body. At the climax of the fight, he collected god ki from an oblivious Uub and sent it to Vegeta, who then later transferred it to Goku so Moro can be killed for good. The Grand Supreme Kai returns to his deep sleep soon after, with Buu oblivious to all that transpired.

=== In other media ===
In Dragon Ball GT, an anime-only original sequel to Dragon Ball Z, Mr. Buu merges permanently with Uub, living on in his subconscious. Buu is also seen in the 2008 short film Dragon Ball: Yo! Son Goku and His Friends Return!! and plays a small role in the 2013 theatrical Dragon Ball Z film, Battle of Gods.

Majin Buu briefly appears in an episode of the 1997 anime remake of Toriyama's Dr. Slump, and makes a brief cameo appearance in Toriyama's manga series Neko Majin Z. He also appears in chapter four of the Saikyō Jump manga Dragon Ball SD, a super deformed spin-off of Dragon Ball written by Naho Ōishi, which depicts a comedic alternate retelling of him being released. Ōishi drew a special chapter focusing on Buu for the July 2014 issue, titled Dragon Ball SD Majin Buu Extra Story (ドラゴンボールSD 魔人ブウ番外編, Doragonbōru SD Majin Bū Bangai-hen) it also features Toriyama's Neko Majin.

He is a playable character in the franchise's video games, the first being Dragon Ball Z: Super Butōden 3 in 1994, but also in most of the more recent games such as the Dragon Ball Z: Sparking! series. In the 2005 game Dragon Ball Z: Supersonic Warriors 2, Evil Buu creates a dimensional hole that extends to the afterlife, traveling there and encountering Vegeta and Dabura, who team up against him under the conviction that their combined strength can prevail. After the fight, Evil Buu commands Dabura to take him to find strong opponents, and meets Cell, pledging to smash him. Evil Buu and Dabura defeat Cell with a combined attack. He is also playable in the Weekly Shōnen Jump crossover games Battle Stadium D.O.N, Jump Ultimate Stars and Jump Force

He is also referenced in the song "Pink Matter" by Frank Ocean featuring André 3000 in the lyrics "That soft pink matter, Cotton candy Majin Buu". American rapper Denzel Curry also refers to Buu in the song "Zuu" with the lyrics "M's all on my belt, I'm feelin' like I'm Majin Buu".

== Reception ==
Majin Buu is a popular character in the Dragon Ball series. In 2004, Japanese fans voted him the eighth most popular character. He was rated by Wizard magazine as the 40th-greatest villain of all time, the only anime or manga character from Japan to make the list. IGN's David F. Smith states that although he is tough, Majin Buu's pink complexion prevents anybody from taking him as a serious threat. Theron Martin of Anime News Network claims Buu's "childlike demeanor actually gives his malicious smiles and mad faces a surprisingly chilling effect", claiming it sets him apart from the "hyper-evil badasses" of the series. He called Josh Martin's English vocal performance far more childish than Kōzō Shioya's, but also felt that Shioya's voice does not fit Buu's behavior. According to Dennis Amith of J!-ENT, seeing him "kill people for the sake of hunger or for enjoyment to hear things go 'boom'" makes Buu the deadliest villain of the series.
