= Prominence (video game) =

2015 video game

- Prominence Cover Art
- Developer: Digital Media Workshop
- Engine: Proprietary
- Platform: Microsoft Windows
- Release: WW: November 6, 2015
- Genre: Adventure
- Mode: Single Player

Prominence is a science fiction point and click adventure game developed by Digital Media Workshop, an independent video game developer located in New York City. Gameplay involves puzzle-solving, character arcs, and a story of hope and humanity in the traditions of science fiction stories.

In August 2013 a demo version was released for review. On January 21, 2014, the game was Greenlit on the Steam distribution platform. On July 22, 2015, it was announced that the developers had begun to publish a prologue on the Internet. Each week, a new episodic chapter was published online providing more information about the background of the characters, the game world and the colonizing mission. The full game was released on November 6, 2015.

== Story ==
After living for generations as persecuted refugees, the Letarri people set their sights on a far-off planet as a promising new home. But when the interstellar mission to colonize the new world goes terribly awry, the fate of their people falls into the hands of a lone adventurer. It's up to the player to unravel the mystery of what happened. The game's title refers to the natural phenomenon of a solar prominence.

== Gameplay ==
The game is a first-person adventure game similar to the Myst and Riven series with a point and click interface in neo futuristic and industrial game settings. The player may also pan around a location by clicking and dragging the mouse. Clicking the mouse to go in a certain direction results in a transition video showing the player's movement. Some puzzles come in the form of a retro text-based computer interface or 2D GUI puzzles.

== Development ==
The first story treatment was written in January 2006. Originally they used a modified Nucleosys SCream engine; formerly used for the point and click horror adventure game, Scratches. In 2009 they developed an in-house proprietary engine which would better fulfill the game's needs.
