= Yūko Minaguchi =

Japanese actress and narrator (born 1966)

- 皆口 裕子
- Born: Tomoko Minaguchi (水口 知子); June 26, 1966 (age 60); Bunkyō, Tokyo, Japan
- Occupations: Actress; voice actress; narrator
- Years active: 1980–present
- Agent: Aoni Production
- Notable work: Dragon Ball as Videl and Pan; Sailor Moon as Sailor Saturn; Yawara! as Yawara Inokuma; Famicom Detective Club as Ayumi Tachibana
- Website: Official profile

Yūko Minaguchi (皆口 裕子, Minaguchi Yūko; born June 26, 1966) is a Japanese actress, voice actress and narrator from Bunkyō, Tokyo affiliated with Aoni Production.

In 2012, Minaguchi took a nineteen-month-long hiatus from acting in order to study abroad in the United States, resulting in Shino Kakinuma being cast as Videl for the final arc of Dragon Ball Kai, although Minaguchi did reprise her role as the character for 2013's theatrical film Dragon Ball Z: Battle of Gods and has continued to voice her afterwards.

== Filmography ==
=== Television animation ===
1980s

- Bosco Adventure (1986) (Princess Apricot)
- Kamen no Ninja Akakage (1987) (Akane)
- Sally the Witch (1989) (Nancy)
- YAWARA! a fashionable judo girl! (1989) (Yawara Inokuma and Kaneko Inokuma)
- Jushin Liger (1989) (Yuki)

1990s

- The Laughing Salesman (1990) (Reiko)
- Here is Greenwood (1991) (Misako)
- Yadamon (1992) (Kira)
- Dragon Ball Z (1993) (Videl and Pan)
- Sailor Moon S (1994) (Hotaru Tomoe (Sailor Saturn), Mistress 9, Girl)
- Sailor Moon Sailor Stars (1996) (Hotaru Tomoe (Sailor Saturn))
- Dragon Ball GT (1996) (Pan and Videl)
- Dr. Slump (Remake) (1997) (Midori Yamabuki)
- Flame of Recca (1997) (Menō Sakura)
- Cardcaptor Sakura (1998) (Nadeshiko Kinomoto)
- Reign: The Conqueror (1999) (Roxanne)
- Betterman (1999) (Kaede)

2000s

- UFO Baby (2000) (Miki Kozuki)
- Gensomaden Saiyuki (2000) (Yaone)
- Final Fantasy: Unlimited (2001) (Marie Hayakawa)
- A Little Snow Fairy Sugar (2001) (Saga's mother)
- Kanon (2002) (Akiko Minase)
- Inuyasha (2003) (Koyuki/Yuki-on'na)
- Final Approach (2004) (Yurika Menou)
- Fushigiboshi no Futagohime (2005) (Princess Grace)
- Onegai My Melody (2006) (Kuromi's Mother)
- Hayate the Combat Butler (2007) (Yukariko Sanzenin)
- Clannad (2007) (Kōko Ibuki)
- MapleStory (2007) (Kino)
- Princess Resurrection (2007) (Sawawa Hiyorimi)
- Casshern Sins (2008) (Ringo)
- Yes! Precure 5 GoGo! (2008) (Flora)
- Rosario + Vampire Capu2 (2008) (Tsurara Shirayuki)
- Detective Conan (2009) (Mina Eguchi)

2010s

- One Piece (2010) (Portgas D. Rouge)
- Sket Dance (2011) (Omi Aiko)
- Astarotte no Omocha! (2011) (Mercelida Ygvar)
- Is This a Zombie? (2011) (Delusion Eucliwood #4)
- Place to Place (2012) (Miiko Inui)
- Sword Art Online II (2014) (Freyja)
- Hokuto no Ken: Ichigo Aji (2015) (Yuria)
- Dragon Ball Super (2015) (Videl and Pan)
- Is the Order a Rabbit? (2015) (Chiyoko Hoto)
- The Case Files of Lord El-Melloi II: Rail Zeppelin Grace Note (2019) (Hishiri Adashino)
- Demon Slayer: Kimetsu no Yaiba (2019) (Rei Kibutsuji)

2020s

- Bofuri (2020) (Mizari)
- Skeleton Knight in Another World (2022) (Glenys)
- The Dangers in My Heart (2023) (Yamada's mother)
- Beastars Final Season (2024) (Toki)
- Turkey! Time to Strike (2025) (Akebi)

=== Original video animation (OVA) ===
- Dragon's Heaven (1988) (Ikuuru)
- Blue Sonnet (1989) (Yumi)
- Final Fantasy: Legend of the Crystals (1994) (Linaly)
- Golden Boy (1995) (Naoko Katsuda)
- Bio Hunter (1995) (Sayaka)
- Otogi-Jūshi Akazukin (2005) (Sayo Suzukaze)

=== Theatrical animation ===
- Doraemon: Nobita and the Tin Labyrinth (1993) (Sapio)
- Dragon Ball Z: Broly – Second Coming (1994) (Videl)
- Slam Dunk (1994) (Yoko Shimamura)
- Dragon Ball Z: Fusion Reborn (1995) (Videl)
- 2112: The Birth of Doraemon (1995) (Noramyako)
- Dragon Ball Z: Wrath of the Dragon (1995) (Videl)
- X (1996) (Hinoto)
- Neighborhood Story (1996) (Ayumi Oikawa)
- Saiyuki: Requiem (2000) (Yaone)
- Yes! Precure 5: Great Miraculous Adventure in the Mirror Kingdom! (2007) (Dark Mint)
- Clannad (2007) (Kouko Ibuki)
- Dragon Ball Z: Battle of Gods (2013) (Videl)
- Dragon Ball Z: Resurrection 'F' (2015) (Videl)
- Detective Conan: Sunflowers of Inferno (2015) (Umeno (Flashback))
- Yo-kai Watch Shadowside: Oni-ō no Fukkatsu (2017) (Neko-Musume)
- Dragon Ball Super: Super Hero (2022) (Videl, Pan)
- Birth of Kitarō: The Mystery of GeGeGe (2023) (Hinoe Ryuga)

=== Video games ===
- Earnest Evans (1991) (Anett Myer)
- Anett Futatabi (1993) (Anett Myer)
- Langrisser I (1993) (Chris)
- Pretty Soldier Sailor Moon: Another Story (1995) (Hotaru Tomoe/Sailor Saturn)
- BS Tantei Club: Yuki ni Kieta Kako (1997) (Ayumi Tachibana)
- Dragon Ball series (1997–) (Videl, Pan)
- Ehrgeiz (1998) (Tifa Lockhart)
- Gunbird 2 (1998) (Tavia)
- Mitsumete Knight (1998) (Sara Pixis)
- Langrisser V: The End of Legend (1998) (Lambda)
- Gundam Side Story 0079: Rise from the Ashes (1999) (Jacqueline)
- Super Robot Wars series (1999–) (Xenia Grania Bilseia, Monica Grania Bilseia)
- Sonic Shuffle (2000) (Illumina)
- Tales of Eternia (2001) (Farah Oersted)
- Tales of Symphonia (2003) (Farah Oersted)
- The Legend of Heroes series (2004–) (Klose Rinz)
- Crimson Tears (2004) (Shizuka)
- Tokimeki Memorial Girl's Side: 2nd Kiss (2007) (Mizushima Hisoka)
- Klonoa: Door to Phantomile (Wii) (2008) (Lephise)
- Clannad Full Voice (2008) (Kouko Ibuki)
- Ninja Gaiden series (2008–) (Momiji)
- Loveplus (2009–) (Nene Anegasaki)
- Warriors Orochi 3 Hyper (2012) (Momiji)
- Dead or Alive 5 Ultimate (2013) (Momiji)
- Granblue Fantasy (2014–) (Sorn/Tweyen)
- Warriors Orochi 3 Ultimate (2014) (Momiji)
- Dead or Alive Xtreme 3 (2016) (Momiji)
- Phantasy Star Online 2 Episode 4 (2016) (Phaleg Ives)
- Dead or Alive 6 (2019) (Momiji)
- Famicom Detective Club: The Missing Heir and The Girl Who Stands Behind (2021) (Ayumi Tachibana)
- Monochrome Mobius: Rights and Wrongs Forgotten (2022) (Shunya)
- Dragon Quest Treasures (2022) (Princess Anemone, Monsters)
- Emio – The Smiling Man: Famicom Detective Club (2024) (Ayumi Tachibana)

=== Dubbing ===
==== Live-action ====
- Babe: Pig in the City (2002 NTV edition) (Zootie)
- Dungeons & Dragons (Empress Savina (Thora Birch))
- The Virgin Suicides (Lux Lisbon (Kirsten Dunst))

==== Animation ====
- Hello Kitty's Furry Tale Theater (Catnip)
- Topo Gigio (2003) (Rosie)
- Pokémon the Movie: Genesect and the Legend Awakened (2013) (Chill Drive Genesect) (English dub)
