= Editing of anime in distribution =

The content of Japanese animation (anime) is frequently edited by distributors, both for its release in Japan or during subsequent localizations. This happens for a variety for reasons, including translation, censorship, and remastering.

== Regional considerations ==
=== Japan ===
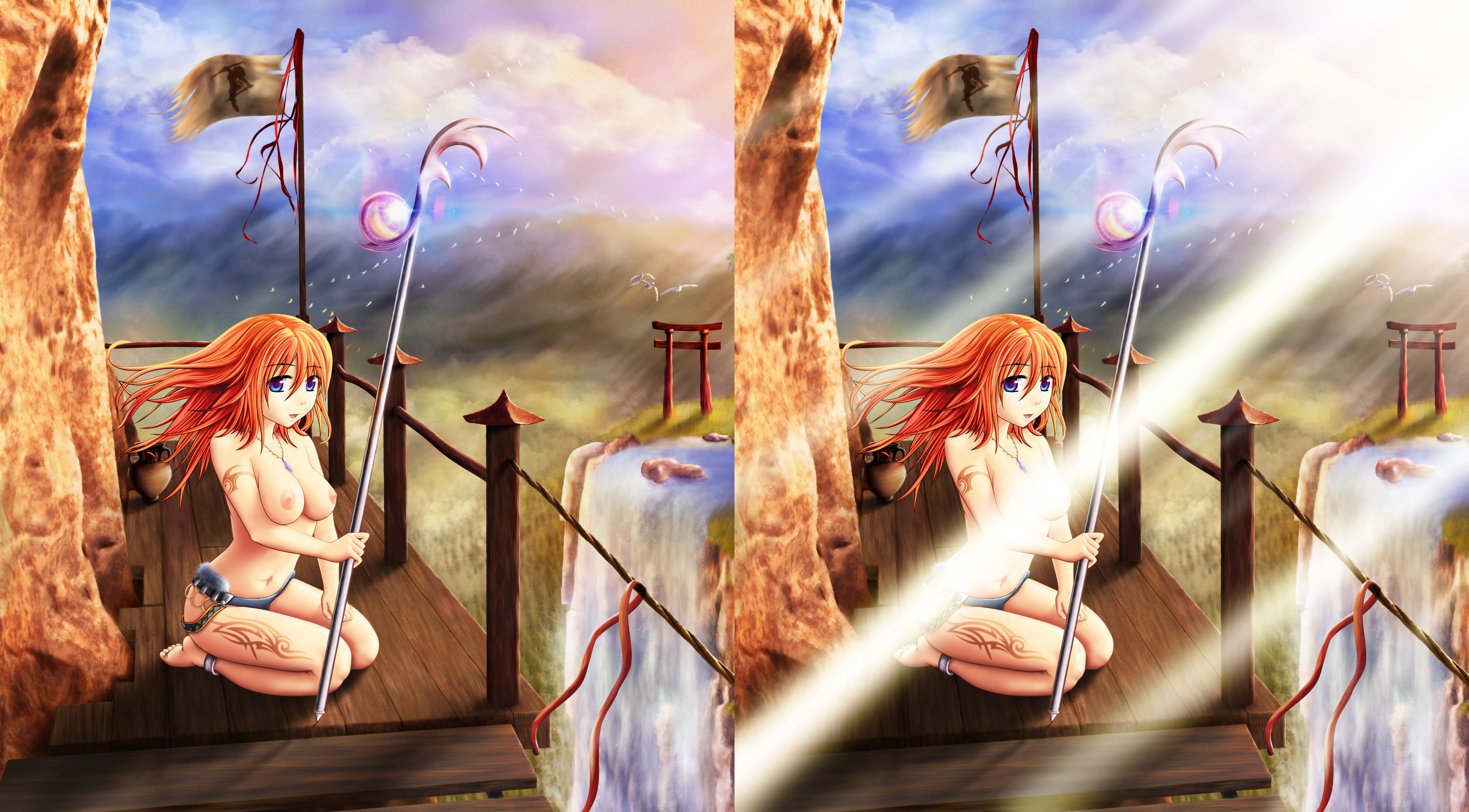
Censorship with artificial light rays is one common method to hide some elements in anime television series. The degree of censorship can vary widely across television stations, even among those broadcasting the series at the same time.

Under article 175 of the Penal Code of Japan, material containing indecent images are prohibited. However the laws date back to 1907 and were unchanged during the process of updating the Japanese constitution in 1947. Over time and due to changing tastes the acceptable standards have become blurred. The display of pubic hair was prohibited until 1991 leading to series such as Lolita Anime and Cream Lemon using the sexualization of children as a loophole. The use of tentacles in series such as Urotsukidōji enabled the creators to avoid a ban on the display of genitals. In other cases, the content is self censored through the use of blurring and black dots. When the censorship is removed for overseas release, the basic animation underneath is revealed, leading to concerns over the sexualization of children in those markets.

Cowboy Bebop and Gantz are examples of titles that received edited broadcasts and were later released as unedited home releases. Episodes of shows such as Mr. Osomatsu have been edited for repeats and home releases.

=== United States ===
Due to the lack of a formal and consistent age rating system in the United States of America, age ratings for anime have created several problems. Blockbuster Video marked all anime titles as unsuitable for kids, leading them to appear as R-18 on their computer system. Publishers began using their own age rating suggestions on their releases, however due to differences between publisher assessments and the use of TV age ratings by some this resulted in an inconsistent system.

When Cartoon Network began to broadcast anime there were no internal standards in place for the use of overseas material. This required them to develop a set of standards and guidelines for the handling of the content. The display of alcohol consumption, tobacco smoking, violence (including depictions of death, spoken references to death and dying, scenes of characters being threatened or in life-threatening situations, and depictions of suicide), gambling, blood, offensive language, offensive hand gestures, sexual content (including nudity, intercourse, innuendo, and depictions of homosexual and transsexual characters), and the mistreatment of women and minors were all deemed unacceptable as well as other situations unsuitable to a younger audience. Material for Cartoon Network was edited for TV-Y7, whereas Adult Swim content was edited for TV-14 standards. However some content that aired on Adult Swim was originally scheduled to air on Toonami and was edited accordingly. Autodesk Inferno was used to digitally edit scenes to remove blood or cover up nudity on content edited by Cartoon Network. In some cases content was edited before it was given to Cartoon Network. The editing practices evolved over time due to complaints from parents.

4Kids Entertainment made changes to the anime they licensed to make them "more Western" in order to be more accessible to children. Another reason was so that they could easily merchandise them. However, they also released uncut versions of some of those shows.

==== Possible impact of Texas Senate Bill 20 ====
In 2025, some individuals worried about possible censorship as a result of Texas Senate Bill 20, which creates new criminal offenses for those who possess, promote, or view visual material deemed obscene, which is said to depict a child, whether it is an actual person, animated or cartoon depiction, or an image of someone created through computer software or artificial intelligence. Much of the controversy regarding S.B. 20 involves the broad language pertaining to "obscene" pornographic images as including A.I.-created, animated, and cartoon depictions, with some critics arguing it could have a chilling effect on anime, manga, graphic novels, and other media produced, distributed, or created within Texas.

Anime Matsuri co-founder Deneice Leigh called for the law's wording to be clarified and described the bill as "vague and open to interpretation" as to what would be considered obscene and offensive. Kirsten Cather, an Asian Studies scholar at University of Texas, expressed concern at the law's misinterpretation because "many anime characters appear youthful, regardless of their actual age," said that the law could "stifle creative expression," and noted that the law's scope is broad enough to have manga and anime under scrutiny, a "real slippery slope here that's being breached."

Others argued that the law is problematic because many anime and manga characters are underage, with their actions possibly considered "violent or otherwise inappropriate from a certain perspective," argued that the law could apply in limited cases if state officials deemed an anime or manga under scrutiny as lacking "artistic value," said that the legislation's vague wording made it "dangerous" for anime such as Dragon Ball and Naruto, and said that it could be used to censor stories with "young LGBTQIA characters." Additional critics said that the legislation could lead to censorship of "many anime and manga projects," like Kill la Kill and The 100 Girlfriends Who Really, Really, Really, Really, Really Love You, a larger ban of materials within Texas, and cause people to be thrown in prison for reading manga like Berserk and Vagabond, or watching Dandadan.

Additional critics argued that the law's broad wording could inadvertently "criminalize certain forms" of anime, manga, video games, and artistic expression, leading to censorship of creative works. Legal expert and Comic Book Legal Defense Fund director Jeff Trexler was also critical of the law. He expressed worry that the legislation "may discourage people from engaging with specific titles, leading to unspoken censorship," guessed that the law may be aiming to "instill fear" rather than enforce it, and argued that the law allows for the "unconstitutional prosecution for possessing certain cartoons or animation."

=== Italy ===
==== History of censorship of anime in Italy ====
The first anime aired in Italy on private-owned networks were almost uncut, even if those contained some vaguely risqué scenes such as in The Rose of Versailles and Georgie!

The first anime to be systematically censored in Italy probably was Alpen Rose, which aired in Italy in 1986, set during World War II. The censors went even to the point of cutting 9–10 minutes per episode, practically almost half episode in original version, in order to avoid any reference of the war.

Another series produced by Tatsunoko and with a similar wartime setting, Nobara no Julie, was censored by cutting every mention of Italy: the aircraft which killed the protagonist's parents was Italian.

==== The 1980s–1990s ====
Later, during the second half of the 1980s, another kind of censorship was applied to the original series, trying to remove every reference to Japan from the series and leaving the stories' settings more generic: an example in this sense was F, whose protagonist had his name changed from Gunma Akagi to Patrick and Formula J, the Japanese auto racing championship, became the European Formula 3000 and, if during the race, an ad signage with Japanese text appeared, said scene was cut.

Another 1980s series, Kimagure Orange Road, which was one of the most censored anime in Italy, alongside Kodomo no Omocha and Marmalade Boy. Besides the cut of several scenes, Mediaset did not air two episodes because these were deemed not suitable for children.

One of the executives in charge of Italia 1's programmation in an interview attributed the "cuts" carried out on Marmalade Boy due to the need of airing the series in watershed without come up against Moige's complaints. Not exempt from censorship was Oh Family, in which the dialogues were edited ad hoc to hide some of the bisexual relationships of the characters.

In the 1990s, when the pace of import of the series was reduced, anime such as Hokuto no Ken and Bishojo Senshi Sailor Moon, the latter aired on Mediaset, not without polemic. In Autumn 1996, some young men threw a huge rock from an overpass killing a person. During the inspections carried out at the defendants' homes, the police retrieved a The X-Files poster, Dylan Dog comics and some volumes of the Hokuto no Ken manga, the later which was deemed violent and thus, accused of inciting similar behaviour.

Several TV programmes covered the subject and a journalist stated that "Ken is a warrior who throws stones against people".

A year later, psychologist Vera Slepoj stated that Sailor Moon S could be able of seriously compromise boys' sexual identity. Slepoj's accusations were based on some parents' reports, whose male sons who were fans of the anime, arrived at the point of relate to the protagonist. Later, the polemic also extended due to the presence of the Sailor Starlights, female warriors who when did not fought, had male forms.

As a consequence of the polemic, Sailor Moon, already re-edited, was edited even further: in video, with glaring stills and even more in dialogue at the point even of distorting the original plot. In the third season, Haruka and Michiru (Sailor Uranus and Sailor Neptune, respectively), had their relationship changed from a couple of lesbians to two simple friends.

In the last episode of the series, moreover, Sailor Moon, during a particularly violent battle, appears at the end stark naked: even though that kind of nudity was meant as symbolic, it was censored.

Another series which suffered censorship was Slayers, had its title changed to Un incantesimo dischiuso tra i petali del tempo per Rina. Some names of the characters were changed and the characters' surnames were removed.

The names of the spells and the formulas were completely changed. The last three episodes of the second season were merged in one episode with over 40 minutes of cut scenes. Moreover, the periods which prevented Lina Inverse of cast her spells were became a non-specified "illness" in the Mediaset version.

==== The MOIGE era and ADAM Italia ====
In the year 2000, the Dragon Ball controversy erupted: a mother flipping through a volume of the Dragon Ball manga bought for her son, had read the part here Bulma showed her panties to Muten Roshi while she was not aware Goku took them off her a night before and, considering said scene not suitable for children, turned to the Cittadinanzattiva association, where the mother presented a statement to the Public Prosecutor's office in Rome against the Star Comics publishing house.

The incriminated scene was accused of favoring pedophilia because, by reading that scene, a child would think that showing underwear to something normal. Despite this, the incident was defused in a few time without any consequence, except for the two following reissues, Star Comics, in order to avoid further polemic and legal actions, decided to censor the scene in question (Note: Completely restored only from the fourth reissue, named Evergreen Edition, published in 2011.) and in the initial page of every manga published by Star Comics, a disclaimer was added where it was specified that every character, even though being only graphical representations, are 18 or older, even though Goku himself, the series' protagonist, was still a kid.

In the latest years, One Piece and Naruto were added to the censorship lists. In the former, the scenes featuring blood were cut, in some cases the dialogues as well. In Naruto the scenes with blood were already cut since from the first episode, in other episodes, scenes featuring blood were censored by darkening the image or fading out the color of the blood (made black and opaque).

Some dialogues were revised while some words were downtoned with more childish terms: "idiot" (in the original version, baka, which means also "stupid") was replaced by "squarehead" (testa quadra) when directed at the protagonist Naruto, and terms such as kill and die were often replaced with synonyms such as get rid of, eliminate, terminate or lose the life (a phenomenon later reduced and almost extinct, specially during the airing of the last seasons of Naruto Shippuden).

Moreover, in the series the humanity of the ninjas was something dealt with, which in the Italian dub was downplayed, by making them more "superhero-like" rather than complex individuals.

There are cases in which an anime was first aired in a version more true to the original and later, in an edited version. An emblematic example is Saint Seiya: even though Fininvest bought the rights, the series was initially aired on television networks such as Odeon TV and Italia 7 without particular video censorship. Since 2000, Mediaset started to ai it on its own networks, but applying noticeable edits and censorship. In later airings, including the re-runs from 2008 and the airing of the Hades saga, the censorship was furtherly accentuated: several scenes featuring blood were faded (chromatically altered) and, in particular, in the opening credits, the trickle of blood dripping from Phoenix Ikki's forehead.

Even Dragon Ball followed a similar path. Initially aired in 1996 as top series of the Junior TV network, it suffered a first editing including the modification of dialogues to remove sexually-charged references and gags, along with the omission of some scenes (never dubbed at this stage). (Note: These scenes which never were dubbed were restored mai doppiate in the DVD edition byYamato Video with the original Japanese audio track and Italian subtitles.) When the anime went to Mediaset in 1998, it underwent further and more extended video censorship (applied only during the televised airing), such as the katakana characters seen on the Dragon Balls in the opening credits.

Dragon Ball Z followed' a different path. Initially distributed in VHS by DeAgostini in 1998, it had a dub supervised by Mediaset including slight dialogue edits, but not featuring video censorship (the same approach was employed for Dragon Ball GT). When the series aired on Italia 1 in 2000, the video censorship was less incisive than the one which affected the previous series, Dragon Ball.

However, the situation drastically changed during later re-runs. In the 2011-2012 re-run, for instance, three episodes (79, 80 and 85) were for the first time skipped at MOIGE's behest, who deemed those excessively violent.. Moreover, unlike previous re-runs, during this same re-run, heavy video censorship was introduced, interventng on almost every scene where blood was present. The scene of the episode 253, where two gunmen shoot an old couple for fun, was entirely removed, since the exhibition of this scene in a previous re-run already costed the network a €100.000 fine.

Another significative case were Lupin the 3rd Part I and Lupin the 3rd Part II, which were initially aired uncut on regional networks, later underwent video and dialogue edits during the televised run of both series on the national networks.

=== United Kingdom ===
In the United Kingdom, the Video Recordings Act 1984 and subsequently the Video Recordings Act 2010 make it a legal requirement for all home video media to be certified by the British Board of Film Classification. Sale or hire of unrated media is prohibited however imported media is allowed for personal use providing the content does not breach UK law. The BBFC is responsible for assigning age ratings to video content and if necessary requesting cuts and refusing certification if content fails guidelines. Examples of content deemed unacceptable include graphic violence and scenes of a sexual nature such as underage sex and sexual violence.

A number of releases were substantially cut in order to pass certification including the Urotsukidōji series and Adventure Duo. The Infernal Road entry in the Urotsukidōji series was delayed by the BBFC for three years and included two outright rejections until the final episode was released by itself, with the scripts for the other entries included as DVD extras. La Blue Girl was also refused a classification for its pornographic exploits of underage women. La Blue Girl Returns was passed as 18 after heavy mandatory cuts of 35 minutes across 4 episodes. During the early 90s anime in the UK was subject to a negative press campaign by several newspapers as a reaction to the violence and sexualized content in many of the available titles. Publishers took advantage of this through the selected licensing of risqué anime in order to appeal to their chosen market. In 1995, 25% of anime released in the UK at that point was rated 18 and 36% was rated 15. As of 2006, the average work was passed uncut at a 12 rating. In some cases a heavier BBFC rating was actually desired by the publishers with excessive swearing deliberately inserted in order to gain a higher age rating, a process known as fifteening. An example given by the BBFC was Patlabor receiving a 15 rating due to the language used, whereas it would have otherwise passed as a PG.

=== Australia and New Zealand ===
In 2020, the streaming of Interspecies Reviewers on AnimeLab in Australia and New Zealand was delayed due to "adjusting [its] sourcing of materials" after parent company Funimation ceased streaming the series.

== Types of editing ==
=== Localization ===
Localization is an essential process in releasing anime outside of Japan. It can cover a range of different processes depending on the individual title and the desired result. At its most basic level, the localization process is responsible for deciding on romanized character and term names, as well as episode titles. In other cases, it may require special attention to areas such as humor where a judgement call must be made to try and retain the feeling of the source material. At its most intense it may involve editing of the content itself in order to fit a target market.

=== Music ===
In some cases, the original Japanese music may be replaced with alternate regional music. This can be either a technical consideration caused by footage getting cut since it is synchronized with the audio on the episode master, or it can be an artistic consideration.

=== Changes to episode count and order ===
The Pokémon episode "Dennō Senshi Porygon" was removed from all repeats and home releases of the series due to an issue during its original broadcast. It was never released in any form outside of Japan. For the North American Blu-ray release of Mobile Suit Gundam, series producer Yoshiyuki Tomino removed episode 15 of the series due to its poor quality animation.

=== Repackaged shows ===
The Robotech series was created as a mix of three originally separate and unrelated series The Super Dimensional Fortress Macross, Super Dimension Cavalry Southern Cross and Mospeada. Characters were renamed and the story was adapted to create links between each of the source series.

Battle of the Planets was adapted from Science Ninja Team Gatchaman with 85 of the original 106 episodes being adapted by Sandy Frank for US broadcast in 1979. Along with westernized character names, other changes included the removal of violent scenes and entirely new animation inserted in places. A new character was also created. The series was then released as G-Force: Guardians of Space by Turner Broadcasting, with fewer changes to the original Japanese version.

=== Nudity and sexuality ===
A bathing scene from the original and the first English version of Sailor Moon. In the original English dub (bottom image), the visibility of Usagi's nudity is censored by darkening the water.

As nudity is far more stigmatized in the U.S. than it is in Japan, such content is often edited out of locally distributed anime. Although U.S. law regarding child pornography does not prohibit cartoon pornography, suggested underage nudity is also commonly censored. In the original U.S. release of Sailor Moon, all of the female leads' transformation sequences were airbrushed to remove the lines tracing their breasts and pubic areas (except for Moon and Chibi Moon; their sequences had little or no lines), even though the characters were shown in silhouette form only. This kind of editing is not limited to cartoons aimed at older audiences, either. For example, the anime series Blue Gender contained scenes of sex (next to blood and intense violence), which was edited out when shown in the U.S. on Adult Swim (the series was originally planned to air on Toonami but was considered too graphic). Another example, ADV Films edited out nudity of high-school-aged characters from the American DVD release of the anime Sakura Diaries. However, the edits to the animation were not done by ADV Films but were shown on TV in Japan. The video was already edited for exposed female private parts, and were covered by inserted lingerie. Dialogue was also altered to shield suggestions of adolescent age. In 2001, the now-defunct Sterling Entertainment Group removed all shots featuring the mermaids' bare bosoms on Hans Christian Andersen's The Little Mermaid concerning the film was marketed towards children, which went out-of-print after its closure in 2006. Meanwhile, in February 2008, the government of Canada banned imports of such hentai series Cool Devices and Words Worth, as it cited those series as "obscene" under federal guidelines.

== Views ==
Hayao Miyazaki's anime film Nausicaä of the Valley of the Wind was heavily edited by Manson International in the mid-1980s and released as Warriors of the Wind. About one-quarter of the film was cut and its storyline simplified somewhat, affecting the nuances of the original's ecological and pacifist themes. Miyazaki disapproved of these edits, and suggested that those who have viewed the edited version should "dismiss it from their minds." Studio Ghibli subsequently adopted a "no-edits" policy for international releases of their films. Beginning from the late 1990s onward, the studio allowed its catalog to be dubbed into English by Walt Disney Pictures, on the condition that the policy was followed, and that the English dialogue would not be significantly altered. Nausicaä of the Valley of the Wind was re-dubbed and re-released in its unedited form by Disney in 2005.

The "no-edits" policy was enforced when Miramax co-founder Harvey Weinstein suggested editing Princess Mononoke to make it more marketable. In response, a Studio Ghibli employee held up a prop katana and said, "Mononoke Hime! No cut!" Studio Ghibli has permitted some minor changes to translated dialogue, such as the removal of references to testicles in the English dub of Pom Poko, replacing them with the euphemism "raccoon pouch".

== See also ==
- Anime industry
- History of anime
- Re-edited film
- Standards & Practices
