= Sean Schemmel =

American voice actor (born 1968)

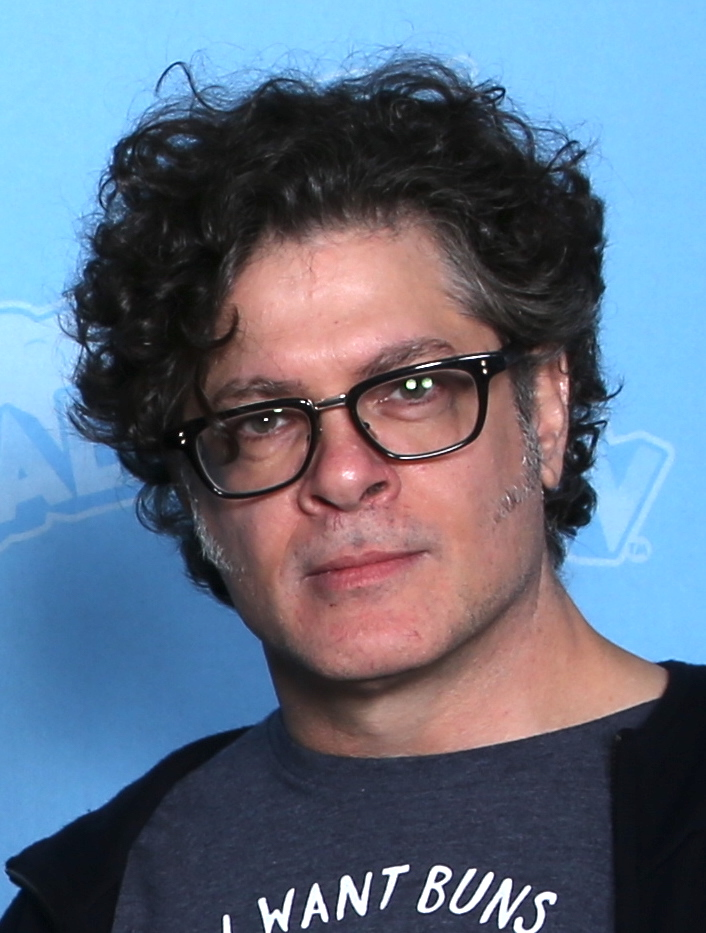
- Schemmel in 2019
- Born: November 21, 1968 (age 57); Waterloo, Iowa, U.S.
- Occupations: Voice actor; ADR director; screenwriter
- Years active: 1997–present
- Spouses: Melissa Cox (m. 1993; div. 1998) Melodee Lenz (m. 1998; div. 2001)

Sean Schemmel (born November 21, 1968) is an American voice actor, ADR director, and screenwriter known chiefly for his work in cartoons, anime, and video games. Since 1999, he has served as the adult voice for Son Goku in the English dub of the Dragon Ball franchise.

== Career ==
Initially, Schemmel never planned on becoming a voice actor; he trained to be a classical French horn player. When a friend persuaded him to audition for Dragon Ball Z, he tried out for a minor character who was going to be killed in the first season of the show. He had been recording for two weeks before he was told that he was going to be the lead. Since being cast as Son Goku by Funimation in 1999, he has been the most consistent English voice actor for the main protagonist of the Dragon Ball franchise, having voiced the character's older teen and adult incarnations in every anime series produced to date (Dragon Ball, Dragon Ball Z, Dragon Ball GT, Dragon Ball Z Kai, Dragon Ball Super, and Dragon Ball Daima) and most Dragon Ball animated movies and video games, as well as other characters such as King Kai and Goku Black.

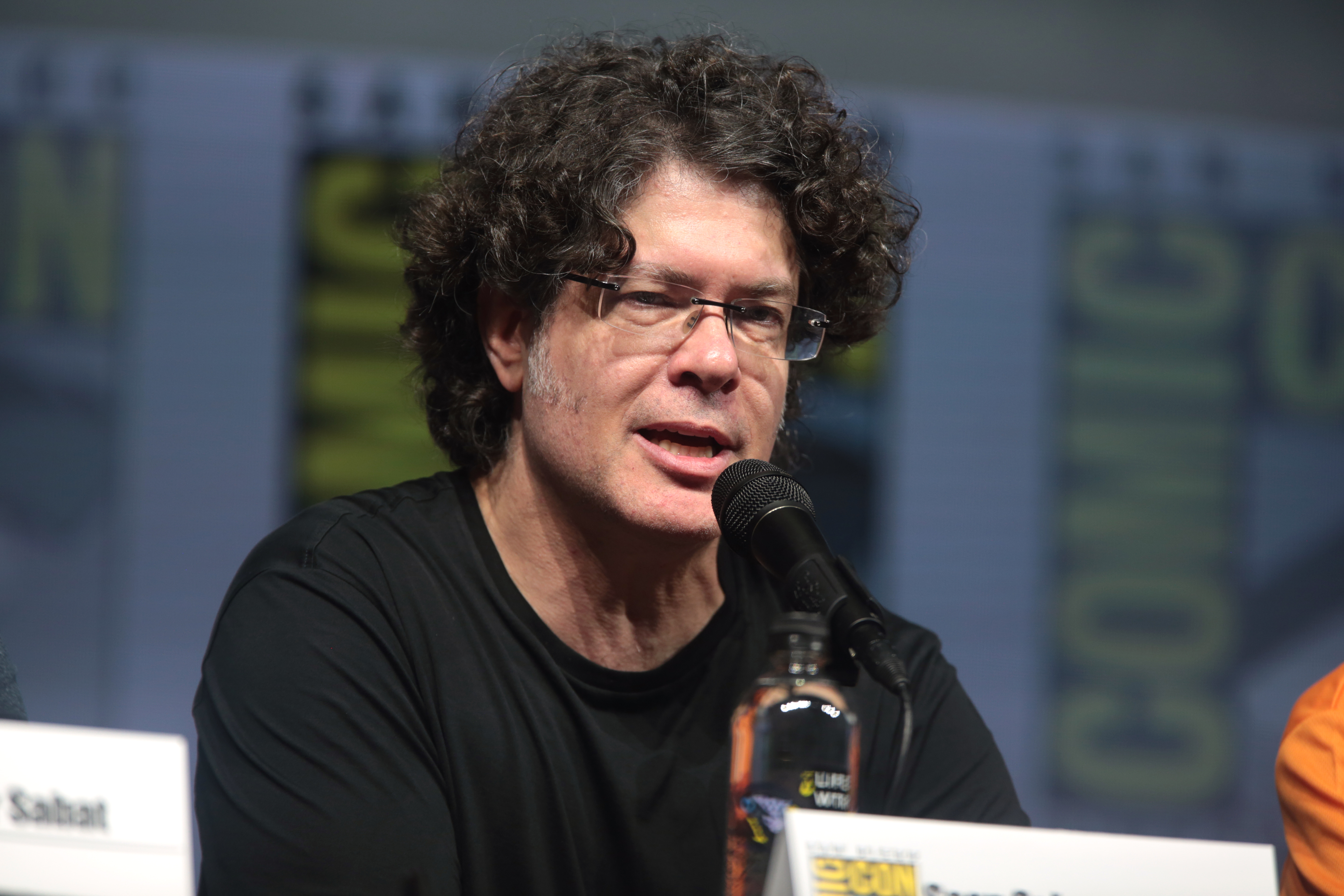
Schemmel at San Diego Comic-Con in 2018

Besides voicing Goku, Schemmel has lent his voice to several other anime characters including Amidamaru in Shaman King (2001), Lucario in Pokémon and Elliot Grant in Mew Mew Power. His other roles in animation include Firefly in G.I. Joe: Sigma 6, Gonard in Kappa Mikey and Hawkman in DC Super Friends. In video games, Schemmel has provided his voice to Makuta in Bionicle, Black Doom in Shadow the Hedgehog, Maxwell in Bullet Witch, Horace in Skullgirls, Batman in The Dark Knight Rises, Sun Wukong (whom Goku was originally based on) in Smite, and Marc Wilson in Fallout 4.

In addition to his voice acting career, Schemmel was also an ADR Director and scriptwriter for NYAV Post, where he had directed and adapted for English dubs of several Japanese anime series. In the field of narration, he has won two awards for his audiobook recordings.

== Personal life ==
Schemmel was married to Melissa Cox, from 1993 to 1998. He married actress Melodee Lenz in 1998. The marriage ended nearly three years later. In a 2018 interview, Schemmel mentioned that he is on the autism spectrum.

== Filmography ==
=== Anime ===
List of dubbing performances and production work in anime television series and OVAs
Year	Title	Role	Crew Role, Notes
1999–2003; 2005	Dragon Ball Z	Goku, King Kai, Nail, Vegito	Funimation dub; Vegito shared w/ Christopher Sabat
2001	Dragon Ball Z: Bardock – The Father of Goku	Goku (adult)	TV special: Funimation dub
2001–03	Dragon Ball	Goku (teen)	Funimation dub; Goku (young) voiced by Stephanie Nadolny
2001	Blue Gender	Rick	
2002	Berserk	Gaston, Conrad, others	
2002	Ultimate Muscle	Bone Cold	
2002	YuYu Hakusho	Shigeru Murota, Roto, Mr. Akashi	
2003	Hades Project Zeorymer	Gisou	OVA
2003	Samurai Deeper Kyo	Nobuyuki Sanada	ADR voice director, script writer
2003	Space Pirate Mito		ADR voice director, script writer
2003	Sadamitsu the Destroyer	Junk/Helmet	ADR voice director, script writer
2003–05	Shaman King	Amidamaru, Rio, Nichrom	
2003–15; 2020–present	Pokémon	Morrison, Archie, Cyrus, Sir Aaron's Lucario, Lampent, Dracovish, Sawk, Thundurus	4Kids dub; DuArt dub; Iyuno Media Group dub
2003–05	Dragon Ball GT	Goku (adult, Super Saiyan 4), King Kai, Gogeta (SS4)	Funimation dub; Goku (young) voiced by Stephanie Nadolny; Gogeta shared w/ Christopher Sabat
2004	Dragon Ball GT: A Hero's Legacy	Goku	TV special
2004	Kiddy Grade	Carvo	Episode 4
2004	Seven of Seven		ADR voice director, script writer
2004	Case Closed	Kowalski	Episode 8
2004	Giant Robo	Tetsugyu	OVA
2004	Domain of Murder	Dispatch	OVA
2004	The Gokusen	Minoru Tatsukawa, Kouhei Iwamoto	
2004	Fullmetal Alchemist	Clause's Father	Episode 4
2004	Spiral: The Bonds of Reasoning	Takashi Sonobe	Episodes 1–4
2004	Munto	Munto	OVA
2004	Shura no Toki: Age of Chaos	Shinzaburo Kuki	
2004	Shrine of the Morning Mist	Naonori Hieda	ADR voice director
2004–07; 2013–present	One Piece	Helmeppo, Hatchan, Chabo, Kuroobi; Dr. Indigo; Goku (Note: Dream 9 Toriko & One Piece & Dragon Ball Z Super Collaboration Special, Episode 590: "The Mightiest Collaboration in History vs. the Gluttonous of the Sea")	4Kids dub; Funimation dub
2005	Mobile Police Patlabor: The New Files	Hiromi Yamazaki	OVA
2005	Magical DoReMi	Mirabelle's Father, Simon	
2005	Mew Mew Power	Elliot Grant, The Blue Knight	4Kids dub of Tokyo Mew Mew
2005	Midori Days	Jigoru	ADR voice director, script writer
2005	Piano: The Melody of a Young Girl's Heart	Seiji Nomura	
2005–06	The Galaxy Railways	Humanoid B	Episode 10
2005	Samurai 7	Genzo	Episodes 9, 11–12
2005	Ah! My Goddess	3rd Class Earth Spirit	ADR voice director
2005–06	Yu-Gi-Oh!	Bobasa, Karim	4Kids dub of Yu-Gi-Oh!
2005–08	Yu-Gi-Oh! GX	Vellian Crowler, Ojama Yellow, Thelonious Viper, T-Bone, Mad Dog, Elemental Hero Neos, Crystal Beast Amber Mammoth, Dr. Collector, Trapper	
2005	Lupin III: Island of Assassins	Gordeau	TV special
2006	Pokémon Chronicles	Jimmy	
2006	Munto 2: Beyond the Walls of Time	Munto, Munto's Father	OVA
2006	Ninja Nonsense	Onsokumaru	
2006	Outlanders	Tetsuya Wakatsuki, Geobaldi	OVA
2007	Beck: Mongolian Chop Squad	Hiroto	Episodes 23–24
2007–10	Dinosaur King	Zander, Spectre, King Louis	
2008–11	Yu-Gi-Oh! 5D's	Zigzix, Greiger, MC, Rudolph Heitmann, Hans, Mr.Pitts (season 3)	
2010–13; 2017–18	Dragon Ball Z Kai	Goku, King Kai, Nail, Vegito	Includes The Final Chapters; Vegito shared w/ Christopher Sabat
2010	Mobile Suit Gundam Unicorn	Flaste Schole	OVA
2011–15	Yu-Gi-Oh! Zexal	Bronk Stone, Orbital 7(episode 13–75), Kazuma Tsukumo	
2016	Mobile Suit Gundam Unicorn RE:0096	Flaste Schole	
2017–19	Dragon Ball Super	Goku, King Kai, Goku Black, Vegito	Funimation dub; Vegito shared w/ Christopher Sabat
2020	Radiant	Pen Draig Knight B	Second Season
2021	Mars Red	Yoshinobu Maeda	
2025	Dragon Ball Daima	Goku	Episode 1, Episode 19, Episode 20
2025	My Hero Academia: Vigilantes	Captain Celebrity	

List of dubbing performances in feature films
Year	Title	Role	Notes	Source
2006	Padre Pio	Prefect		
2014	Time of Eve	Katoran		
2014	Dragon Ball Z: Battle of Gods	Goku, King Kai	Limited U.S. theatrical release	
2015	Dragon Ball Z: Resurrection 'F'	Goku	Limited U.S. theatrical release	
2019	Dragon Ball Super: Broly	Goku, Gogeta	Limited U.S. theatrical release Gogeta shared w/ Christopher Sabat	
2022	Dragon Ball Super: Super Hero	Goku	Limited U.S. theatrical release	

List of dubbing performances in anime films
Year	Title	Role	Crew Role, Notes
2001	Dragon Ball Z: Lord Slug	Goku, King Kai	Funimation dub
2002	Dragon Ball Z: Cooler's Revenge	Goku	Funimation dub
2002	Dragon Ball Z: The Return of Cooler	Goku	Funimation dub
2003	Dragon Ball Z: Super Android 13!	Goku	Funimation dub
2003	Dragon Ball Z: Broly – The Legendary Super Saiyan	Goku, King Kai	Funimation dub
2003	The Weathering Continent	Guard 2	ADR voice director
2004	Blue Gender: The Warrior	Rick	Compilation film
2004	Dragon Ball Z: Bojack Unbound	Goku, King Kai	Funimation dub
2005	Kakurenbo: Hide & Seek	Noshiga	
2005	Dragon Ball Z: Broly – Second Coming	Goku	
2005	Dragon Ball Z: Bio-Broly	Goku	
2005	Dragon Ball Z: Dead Zone	Goku	Funimation redub
2006	Negadon: The Monster from Mars	Ryuichi Narasaki	
2006	Pokémon: Lucario and the Mystery of Mew	Lucario	
2006	Dragon Ball Z: Fusion Reborn	Goku, King Kai, Gogeta	Gogeta shared w/ Christopher Sabat
2006	Dragon Ball Z: Wrath of the Dragon	Goku	
2006	Dragon Ball Z: The World's Strongest	Goku	Funimation redub
2006	Dragon Ball Z: The Tree of Might	Goku, King Kai	Funimation redub
2011	Yu-Gi-Oh!: Bonds Beyond Time	Paradox	
2011	Pokémon: Zoroark: Master of Illusions	Grings Kodai	
2012	Berserk: The Golden Age Arc I – The Egg of the King	Gaston, General Gien	
2013	Berserk: The Golden Age Arc II – The Battle for Doldrey	Gaston	
2013	One Piece Film: Strong World	Dr. Indigo	
2014	Berserk: The Golden Age Arc III – The Advent	Gaston, Conrad	

=== Animation ===
List of voice performances in animation
Year	Title	Role	Notes
2003–09	Teenage Mutant Ninja Turtles	Nobody, Yukio Mashimi, Constable Biggles, Sh'Okanabo, Master Khan, Zippy Lad, Various characters	
2005–06	G.I. Joe: Sigma 6	Firefly	
2006–07	Winx Club	Valtor	4Kids version
2006–08	Kappa Mikey	Gonard	
2006	Wulin Warriors	Scar	
2006	Viva Piñata	Bart, Chortles Chippopotamus, Hamilton Horstachio	
2006–11	Thumb Wrestling Federation	Colonel Cossack, Face-Off Phil, Mr. Extremo, Dorsal Flynn, James Montgomery Flag, Lucky O'Leary, Pierre Pamplemousse, Knockout Ninja, Evil Ira, Flashback, The Visitor, The Scorchion, Mugsy Thumbscrew, Scoutmaster Scott.	
2006–10	Chaotic	Maxxor, Ulmar	
2008–09	Three Delivery	Various characters	
2008–09	Speed Racer: The Next Generation	Dickie Ranford, Racer X / Rex Racer, Dr. Chezko / Sparky, narrator	
2009	Pat & Stan	Stuart	
2009–12	Huntik: Secrets & Seekers	LeBlanche, Mr. Mactavish, Ghost of Sir Lancelot	
2011	Shaktimaan Animated	Tock	English dub
2015	DC Super Friends	Hawkman	
2015	Sofia the First	Slim, King Habib	
2015	Lego Scooby-Doo! Knight Time Terror	Charlie, Treasure Hunter No. 2	
2016	Trip Tank	Wayne, Announcer	
2016	Star vs. the Forces of Evil	The Box of Truth	
2017	Spider-Man	Sal Salerno	
2020–24	Lego Monkie Kid	Monkey King, Syntax, Jin	
2022	The Casagrandes	Mr. Vanderspeed	Episode: "Race Against the Machine"

List of voice and dubbing performances in direct-to-video and television films
Year	Title	Role	Crew Role, Notes
2006	Impy's Island	King Pumponell the 55th	
2009	TMNT: Turtles Forever	Raphael 84	
2010	Animals United	Biggie the Rhinoceros	
2011	A Car's Life 2	Fender	
2013	A Car's Life 3: The Royal Heist	Fender, Otto, Pinion	
2015	A Car's Life 4: Junkyard Blues	Fender, Otto	
2016	DC Super Hero Girls: Hero of the Year	Dark Opal	
2017	Tom and Jerry: Willy Wonka and the Chocolate Factory	Mr. Salt, Mr. Turkentine	

=== Live-action ===
List of dubbing performances in live-action television series
Year	Title	Role	Notes
2023	Ultraman Z	Ultraman Zero	English dub
2026	Ultraman Teo	Ultraman Zero	English dub

=== Video games ===
List of dubbing performances in video games
Year	Title	Role	Notes
2002	Dragon Ball Z: Budokai	Goku, King Kai	
2003	Dragon Ball Z: Budokai 2	Goku, Vegito, Gokule	
2003	Bionicle	Makuta	
2004	Dragon Ball Z: Supersonic Warriors	Goku	
2004	Yu Yu Hakusho: Dark Tournament	Roto	
2004	Dragon Ball Z: Budokai 3	Goku, King Kai, Nail, Vegito, Gogeta	
2005	Dragon Ball Z: Sagas	Goku	
2005	Dragon Ball Z: Budokai Tenkaichi	Goku, King Kai (Narration), Vegito, Gogeta	
2005	Shadow the Hedgehog	Black Doom	
2006	Shadow Hearts: From the New World	Ricardo Gomez	
2006	Dragon Ball Z: Shin Budokai	Goku, Vegito, Gogeta	
2006	Super Dragon Ball Z	Goku	
2006	Dragon Ball Z: Budokai Tenkaichi 2	Goku, King Kai, Vegito, Gogeta	
2007	Bullet Witch	Maxwell	
2007	Dragon Ball Z: Shin Budokai – Another Road	Goku, Vegito, Gogeta	
2007	Dragon Ball Z: Budokai Tenkaichi 3	Goku, King Kai, Nail, Vegito, Gogeta	
2008	Dragon Ball Z: Burst Limit	Goku	
2008	Dragon Ball Z: Infinite World	Goku, King Kai, Vegito, Gogeta	
2009	Dragon Ball: Raging Blast	Goku, Vegito, Gogeta	
2010	Dragon Ball Z: Tenkaichi Tag Team	Goku, Vegito, Gogeta	
2010	Dragon Ball: Raging Blast 2	Goku, Nail, Vegito, Gogeta	
2011	Dragon Ball Z: Ultimate Tenkaichi	Goku, King Kai, Vegito, Gogeta	
2012	Skullgirls	Horace	
2012	Dragon Ball Z: For Kinect	Goku, Vegito	
2012	The Dark Knight Rises	Batman	Mobile game
2013	Gangstar Vegas	Jason Malone, Radio Ads	
2014	Dragon Ball Z: Battle of Z	Goku, Vegito	
2014	Smite	Sun Wukong, Thor (Heavy Metal)	
2014	Super Smash Bros. for Nintendo 3DS and Wii U	Lucario	
2015	Dragon Ball Xenoverse	Goku, Tokitoki, Vegito, Gogeta	
2015	Fallout 4	Strong, Marc Wilson, Male Ghouls	
2015	Halo 5: Guardians	Additional Voices	
2016	Dragon Ball Z: Dokkan Battle	Goku (Narration)	Mobile game
2016	Dragon Ball Xenoverse 2	Goku, Nail, Tokitoki, Vegito, Gogeta, Goku Black	
2017	Dishonored: Death of the Outsider	Overseers	
2018	Dragon Ball FighterZ	Goku, Goku Black, Vegito, Gogeta	
2018	Dragon Ball Legends	Goku, Vegito, Gogeta, Goku Black, Nail	Mobile game
2018	Super Smash Bros. Ultimate	Lucario	Archive audio
2020	Dragon Ball Z: Kakarot	Goku, King Kai, Nail, Vegito	
2024	Dragon Ball: Sparking! ZERO	Goku, Nail, Vegito, Gogeta, Goku Black	

== Awards ==
Year	Award	Work	Category	Result
2008	Earphones Award	The Big Splash by Jack D. Ferraiolo		Won
2013	Audie Award	I Suck at Girls by Justin Halpern	Audie Award for Humor	Won
2019	Guinness World Records	Kamehameha	Guinness World Record for most people performing a Kamehameha	Won
