= Sonny Strait =

American voice actor

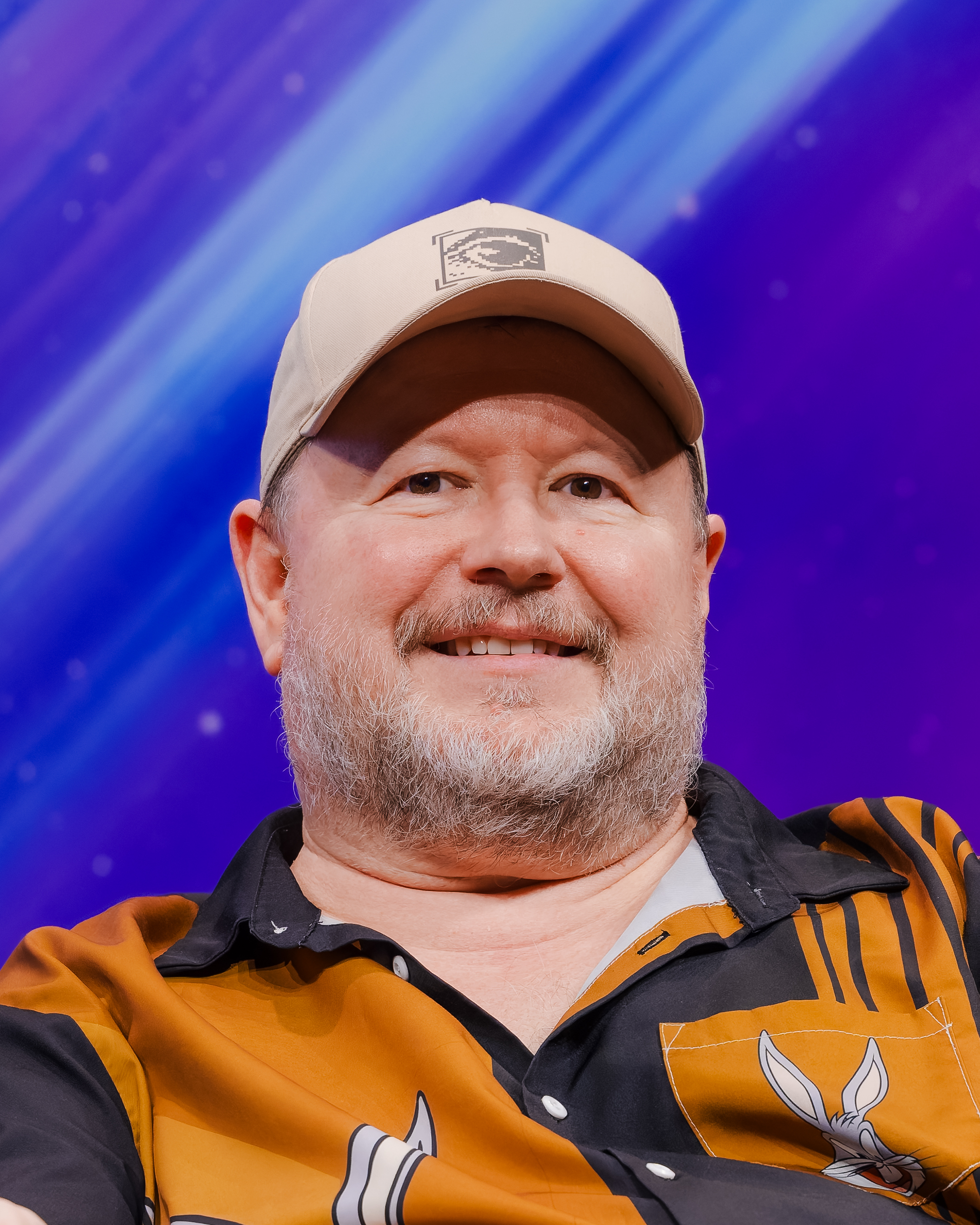
- Strait in 2026
- Born: June 28, 1965 (age 61)
- Other name: Don "Sonny" Strait
- Education: University of North Texas
- Occupations: Voice actor; writer; ADR director; comic creator
- Years active: 1998–present
- Spouses: Davina Lynn Copsy (m. 1986; div. 1992) Alicia Lang Leath (m. 1992; div. 1995) Gayla Jackson (m. 2002)
- Children: 2
- Website: sonnystrait.com

Sonny Strait is an American voice actor, ADR director, and writer, known for his work on a number of English versions of Japanese anime series and as an illustrator for the independently published comic book series Elfquest. Strait has provided the voices for the titular character from Lupin the Third as well as Krillin and Bardock in the Funimation English adaptations of Dragon Ball, Dragon Ball Z, Dragon Ball GT, Dragon Ball Super, and other Dragon Ball media since 1999. He also voice acts as Usopp in the English adaptation of One Piece.

== Career ==
Before becoming a comic book artist, Strait enrolled at the University of North Texas before dropping out two years later. He then began a career drawing comic books and did theater work. Strait began his voice acting career by voicing Krillin in the English dub version of Dragon Ball for Funimation in 1999. He has since consistently voiced the kid, teen and adult incarnations of Krillin in every anime series produced to date (Dragon Ball, Z, GT, Kai, and Super) and numerous of animated movies and video game adaptations, as well as other characters such as Bardock.

Besides voicing Krillin in Dragon Ball, Strait has worked on many popular animated characters including Usopp in One Piece, Maes Hughes in Fullmetal Alchemist, Augustus Kira Clover XIII in Black Clover, and Cartoon Network’s laid back, robot host Toonami TOM, until the T.I.E., The Intruder, when he was replaced by Steve Blum. He has also worked as a writer and director on several TV series including Dragon Ball Z, Case Closed, and Lupin the Third.

As a comic book artist, Strait has 17 published works to date. Strait's self-published debut work, Mr. Average, was featured in The Comics Journal and Elfquest.

In 2007, he wrote and illustrated a graphic novel about reluctant punk rock, faerie princess named Goat. The book, called We Shadows, was published by Tokyopop and was nominated for the American Library Association's award for Best Graphic Novel in 2008. The book received glowing reviews in many trade magazines including Publishers Weekly, Newtype, Play, and Anime Insider.

In 2009, Strait voiced the titular character in the Xbox game 'Splosion Man.

== Personal life ==
Strait has been married three times. He married Davina Lynn Copsy on June 26, 1986. They divorced on April 7, 1992. On June 20, 1992, Strait married Alicia Lang Leath. Strait's second marriage ended in divorce on November 15, 1995. In 2002, Strait married his third wife, Gayla Jackson. Strait is the stepfather of Gayla's children: Savannah and James.

== Dubbing roles ==
=== Anime ===
Year	Title	Role	Notes	Source
1994	Lupin the 3rd: Dragon of Doom	Arsène Lupin III		
1997	Lupin the 3rd: Island of Assassins	Arsène Lupin III		
1998	Lupin III: Burning Memory - Tokyo Crisis	Arsène Lupin III		
1999	Lupin the 3rd: The Columbus Files	Arsène Lupin III		
1999–2003	Dragon Ball Z	Krillin, Bardock, Vodka, Wild Tiger	Funimation dub	
2000	Dragon Ball Z: The History of Trunks	Krillin	TV special, Funimation dub	
2000	Dragon Ball Z: Bardock – The Father of Goku	Bardock	TV special, Funimation dub	
2001–2003	Dragon Ball	Krillin (teen), General Blue, Piano, King Chappa, Bandages, Vodka	Funimation dub	
2001	I'm Gonna Be An Angel	Mikael, Masaru, Kai		
2002	Fruits Basket	Teacher		
2003–2005	Dragon Ball GT	Giru, Krillin, General Blue	Funimation dub	
2004	Samurai 7	Kyuzo	Funimation dub	
2004	Fullmetal Alchemist	Maes Hughes		
2004	Dragon Ball GT: A Hero's Legacy	Krillin, Giru		
2006	Kenichi: The Mightiest Disciple	Apachai Hopachai		
2007–present	One Piece	Usopp, Krillin (Eps. 590)	Funimation dub	
2009	Kenichi: The Mightiest Disciple	Apachai Hopacha		
2010	Fullmetal Alchemist: Brotherhood	Maes Hughes		
2010	Dragon Ball Z Kai	Krillin, Bardock		
2010	Oh! Edo Rocket	Rokube		
2011	Chaos;Head	Fumio Takashina		
2012	Psycho-Pass	Takahashi		
2012	Cat Planet Cuties	Yuichi Miyagi		
2013	Lupin III: The Woman Called Fujiko Mine	Arsène Lupin III		
2014	Code:Breaker	Gotoku Sakurakoji		
2015	Prison School	Reiji Ando		
2015	Mikagura School Suite	Bimii	ADR director	
2015	Show by Rock	Maple Arisugawa	Also season 2	
2015	Assassination Classroom	Koro-sensei	Also season 2 and Koro Sensei Quest	
2015	World Break: Aria of Curse for a Holy Swordsman	Taro Tanaka		
2015	Maria the Virgin Witch	Bernard		
2016	Castle Town Dandelion	Koji Matsuoka		
2016	Escaflowne	Allen Schezar	Funimation dub; ADR director	
2016	Yuri on Ice	Hisashi Morooka	ADR director	
2016	Drifters	Tamon Yamaguchi		
2016	Brothers Conflict	Juli		
2016	Rage of Bahamut: Genesis		ADR director	
2016	Monster Hunter: Ride On	Omna		
2016	Orange	Naho's father		
2016	Pandora in the Crimson Shell: Ghost Urn	Buer		
2016	Rampo Kitan: Game of Laplace	Shadow Man		
2017-2019	Dragon Ball Super	Krillin		
2017	Hand Shakers	Hibiki Moriyama		
2017	ACCA: 13-Territory Inspection Dept.	Owl		
2017	Love Tyrant	Coraly		
2017–2024	My Hero Academia	Present Mic, Rikiya Yotsubashi/Re-Destro	Replaced with Dave Trosko as Present Mic due to health	
2017	Gosick	Rupert de Giret		
2017	Chaos;Child	Fumio Takashina		
2017	ēlDLIVE	Melies		
2017	Convenience Store Boy Friends	Keiichi Miki		
2017	Kado: The Right Answer	Naoki Sasauchi		
2017	Sakura Quest	Tora		
2017	Tsukigakirei	Hiroshi Mizuno	ADR director	
2017	Konohana Kitan	Turtle		
2018	Ace Attorney	Moe	Anime adaptation	
2018	Katana Maidens	Shibata		
2018	Pop Team Epic	Popuko	Episode 2B (male voice)	
2018	Dances with the Dragons	Sazaran		
2019	Fire Force	Joker		
2019	Fruits Basket	Demon King	2019 reboot	
2024	Re:Monster	Gobjii		
2024	Bartender: Glass of God	Kamishima		
2025	Dragon Ball Daima	Krillin		

=== Film ===
Year	Title	Role	Notes	Source
2000	Dragon Ball: Mystical Adventure	General Blue	Funimation dub	
2001	Dragon Ball Z: Lord Slug	Krillin, Gyoshu	Funimation dub	
2002	Dragon Ball Z: Cooler's Revenge	Krillin, Bardock	Funimation dub	
2002	Dragon Ball Z: The Return of Cooler	Krillin	Funimation dub	
2003	Dragon Ball Z: Super Android 13	Krillin	Funimation dub	
2003	Dragon Ball: The Path to Power	General Blue	Funimation dub	
2003	Dragon Ball Z: Broly - The Legendary Super Saiyan	Krillin	Funimation dub	
2004	Dragon Ball Z: Bojack Unbound	Krillin	Funimation dub	
2005	Dragon Ball Z: Broly - Second Coming	Krillin	Funimation dub	
2005	Dragon Ball Z: Dead Zone	Krillin	Funimation dub	
2005	Dragon Ball Z: Bio-Broly	Krillin	Funimation dub	
2006	Dragon Ball Z: Wrath of the Dragon	Krillin	Funimation dub	
2006	Dragon Ball Z: The World's Strongest	Krillin	Funimation dub	
2006	Dragon Ball Z: The Tree of Might	Krillin	Funimation dub	
2013	Wolf Children	Tanabe		
2014	Dragon Ball Z: Battle of Gods	Krillin		
2014	One Piece: Film Z	Usopp		
2015	Dragon Ball Z: Resurrection 'F'	Krillin		
2017	One Piece: Film Gold	Usopp		
2017	Genocidal Organ	Counselor		
2019	Dragon Ball Super: Broly	Bardock		
2019	One Piece: Stampede	Usopp		
2022	Dragon Ball Super: Super Hero	Krillin		
2022	One Piece Film: Red	Usopp		

=== Video games ===
Year	Title	Role	Notes	Source
2002	Dragon Ball Z: Budokai	Krillin		
2003	Dragon Ball Z: Budokai 2	Krillin		
2004	Dragon Ball Z: Supersonic Warriors	Krillin		
2004	Dragon Ball Z: Budokai 3	Krillin, Bardock, Giru		
2005	Dragon Ball Z: Sagas	Krillin, Bardock		
2005	Fullmetal Alchemist 2: Curse of the Crimson Elixir	Maes Hughes		
2005	Dragon Ball Z: Budokai Tenkaichi	Krillin, Bardock		
2006	Dragon Ball Z: Shin Budokai	Krillin		
2006	Super Dragon Ball Z	Krillin		
2006	Dragon Ball Z: Budokai Tenkaichi 2	Krillin, Bardock		
2007	Dragon Ball Z: Shin Budokai - Another Road	Krillin, Bardock		
2007	Dragon Ball Z: Budokai Tenkaichi 3	Krillin, Bardock, General Blue		
2008	One Piece: Unlimited Adventure	Usopp		
2008	Dragon Ball Z: Burst Limit	Krillin, Bardock		
2008	Dragon Ball Z: Infinite World	Krillin, Bardock, Giru		
2009	'Splosion Man	Splosion Man		
2009	Dragon Ball: Revenge of King Piccolo	General Blue, Piano		
2009	Dragon Ball: Raging Blast	Krillin, Bardock		
2010	Dragon Ball: Origins 2	General Blue		
2010	Comic Jumper: The Adventures of Captain Smiley	Dr. Winklemeyer		
2010	Dragon Ball Z: Tenkaichi Tag Team	Krillin, Bardock		
2010	Dragon Ball: Raging Blast 2	Krillin, Bardock		
2011	Ms. Splosion Man	Splosion Man		
2011	Dragon Ball Z: Ultimate Tenkaichi	Krillin, Bardock		
2012	Tribes Ascend	Medium Armor		
2012	Borderlands 2	Rocko, Loader 1340, Lt. Davis		
2012	Dragon Ball Z for Kinect	Krillin, Bardock		
2014	Dragon Ball Z: Battle of Z	Krillin, Bardock		
2015	Smite	Dreadbeard Poseidon		
2015	Dragon Ball Xenoverse	Krillin, Bardock, Giru, Sales Robot		
2016	Battleborn	Benedict		
2016	Dragon Ball Xenoverse 2	Krillin, Bardock, Shop Clerk Robot		
2018	Dragon Ball FighterZ	Krillin, Bardock		
2018	Dragon Ball Legends	Krillin, Bardock		
2019	Borderlands 3	Sparrow		
2020	Dragon Ball Z: Kakarot	Krillin, Bardock		

=== Other ===
List of performances in other media
Year	Title	Role	Notes	Source
1999–2000	Toonami	TOM 1	Programming block on Cartoon Network and later Adult Swim	
2015	The Intruder II	The Intruder	TIE special for Toonami; voice shared with Steve Blum	

== Comics ==
- The Atomic Punk
- B-Side Beat
- Car Bombs (Web Comic)
- Darwin's
- ElfQuest: In All But Blood
- ElfQuest: Wolfshadow
- Goth Metal Gods
- Jack
- Mr. Average
- Muff Dyver and the Sex Gophers from Hell
- We Shadows
- ElfQuest: The Final Quest (color artist)
- ElfQuest: Stargazer's Hunt (comic artist)
