= Dragon Ball Super: Broly =

2018 film directed by Tatsuya Nagamine

- Theatrical release poster
- Directed by: Tatsuya Nagamine
- Screenplay by: Akira Toriyama
- Based on: Dragon Ball Super by Akira Toriyama
- Produced by: Norihiro Hayashida; Rioko Tominaga
- Starring: see below
- Cinematography: Yōsuke Motoki
- Edited by: Masahiro Goto
- Music by: Norihito Sumitomo
- Production company: Toei Animation
- Distributed by: Toei Company, Ltd.; 20th Century Fox Japan
- Release date: December 14, 2018; (Japan)
- Running time: 100 minutes
- Country: Japan
- Language: Japanese
- Budget: $8.5 million
- Box office: $124 million

Dragon Ball Super: Broly (Japanese: ドラゴンボール超(スーパー) ブロリー, Hepburn: Doragon Bōru Sūpā Burorī) is a 2018 Japanese animated martial arts fantasy adventure film. It is the twentieth animated feature film in the Dragon Ball franchise, the first to carry the Dragon Ball Super branding, and is the third film in the franchise to be personally supervised by series creator Akira Toriyama. The film serves as a canonical reimagining of the Broly character from the films Dragon Ball Z: Broly – The Legendary Super Saiyan (1993), Broly – Second Coming (1994), and Bio-Broly (1994) into the main Dragon Ball continuity. Set after the events of the Universe Survival Saga, the plot follows Goku and Vegeta as they encounter the powerful Saiyan named Broly. The film chronicles the history of the Saiyans and the background story of these three Saiyans with different destinies connected to the turbulent period of their race.

The film was released in Japan on December 14, 2018, by Toei and 20th Century Fox Japan. It was well received by critics, especially for its animation, fight sequences, and art style, and was a box office success, grossing over $124 million worldwide and becoming the highest-grossing Dragon Ball film ever. It also became the highest-grossing anime film of 2018 and, at the time, the third highest-grossing anime film in the United States and Canada and the twelfth highest-grossing anime film of all time. It was the final Dragon Ball film co-distributed by 20th Century Fox, following the acquisition of 21st Century Fox by Disney on March 20, 2019.

A sequel, titled Dragon Ball Super: Super Hero, was released in June 2022.

== Plot ==
In Age 732, after being informed by the galactic warlord King Cold that his race will now serve his son Frieza, King Vegeta finds a commoner infant named Broly within a nursery only the elite are accepted in. Learning Broly's power level greatly exceeds that of his infant son Vegeta, whom he believes would liberate their people and conquer the universe, King Vegeta exiles Broly to the distant planetoid Vampa in hopes the infant would die before becoming a potential threat to the Saiyans. Broly's father Paragus attempted to rescue his son, only for the ship he stole to get damaged beyond repair on entry to Vampa. Stuck on Vampa, he raises his son to exact revenge on King Vegeta.

Five years later, a low-class Saiyan warrior named Bardock grows concerned about Frieza's reasons for calling the Saiyans to Planet Vegeta and confides his suspicions in his wife Gine while realizing Frieza's intentions to exterminate their race out of fear of the Super Saiyan and Super Saiyan God legends. He and his wife Gine send their infant son, Kakarot, to Earth some time before Frieza commences the genocide of the Saiyan race. Besides Broly, Paragus, and Kakarot, the other survivors of Saiyans include Kakarot's older brother Raditz, Vegeta and his comrade Nappa, and Vegeta's brother Tarble.

Forty-three years later in age 780, and a few months after the Tournament of Power, (Note: As depicted in the Dragon Ball Super "Universe Survival" arc) Kakarot, now named Son Goku, trains with Vegeta around a desert island before Bulma is informed by her son Trunks that the Dragon Radar and six of the seven magical Dragon Balls in her possession were stolen by low-class Frieza Force soldiers. Bulma leaves her daughter Bulla with Beerus while accompanying Goku, Vegeta, and Whis travel to an arctic region to find the seventh Dragon Ball before Frieza can retrieve it. Meanwhile, Broly and Paragus are rescued from Vampa by Cheelai and Lemo, two low-class Frieza Force soldiers on a recruitment mission. The two are brought to Frieza and are enlisted to defeat Goku and Vegeta. Cheelai steals the remote Paragus uses to keep Broly submissive and breaks it before the two groups cross paths on Earth.

With his increasing power and adaptive fighting abilities, Broly is able to seemingly beat the Saiyan Prince in his Base, Super Saiyan, and Super Saiyan God forms. Goku challenges Broly in his Base, Super Saiyan, Super Saiyan God and Super Saiyan Blue forms and manages to gain the advantage despite Broly gaining more strength while Paragus fears the worst upon learning he lost the means to snap Broly out from his Wrathful form. However, remembering the circumstances that allowed Goku to first acquire his Super Saiyan form, (Note: As depicted in the Dragon Ball Z Frieza arc) Frieza covertly kills Paragus to awaken Broly's latent Super Saiyan powers. The fully mindless Broly overwhelms both Goku and Vegeta in their Super Saiyan Blue forms before being directed to attack Frieza while Goku uses his Instant Transmission technique to get him and Vegeta to Piccolo. The two proceed to teach Vegeta the Fusion Dance technique as he and Goku eventually did, after two failed attempts resulting in the return of the fat and skinny Veku, succeed in forming a man with golden vest trim, an aqua sash, and jet-black hair. The man introduces himself to an impatient Piccolo as Gogeta, then he, upon hearing Piccolo's command to "get up there and defeat him" earlier, arrives to the battlefield as Broly attacks Whis after defeating Golden Frieza. Golden Frieza, Whis and Bulma watch Gogeta dominate the fight in his Super Saiyan form before an infuriated Broly reaches his rage-breaking point and powers up even further into his Super Saiyan Full Power form, countering by assuming Super Saiyan Blue form with their violent clash breaking through multiple dimensions before arriving back on Earth.

Gogeta defeats Broly using Meteor Explosion and nearly kills him with the "Ultimate" Kamehameha but Cheelai and Lemo, who had formed a friendship with Broly, summon the eternal dragon Shenron with the Dragon Balls and use their wish to transport Broly safely back to Vampa. The two then escape with Gogeta preventing their ship from being destroyed by Frieza, who decides to spare them as they can make Broly a more stable asset to his military force. Some time after, Goku arrives on Vampa to provide Cheelai and Lemo with supplies while expressing his intent to spar with Broly and help teach him to control his power. Formally introducing himself before leaving, Goku tells Broly to call him by his birth name, Kakarot.

== Voice cast ==
Character name	Japanese	English
Goku	Masako Nozawa	Sean Schemmel; Colleen Clinkenbeard (young)
Vegeta	Ryō Horikawa	Christopher Sabat
Freeza	Ryūsei Nakao	Christopher Ayres
Broly	Bin Shimada; Yukiko Morishita (young)	Vic Mignogna; Brina Palencia (young)
Paragus	Katsuhisa Hōki	Dameon Clarke
Cheelai (チライ, Chirai)	Nana Mizuki	Erica Lindbeck
Lemo (レモ, Remo)	Tomokazu Sugita	Bruce Carey
Bulma	Aya Hisakawa	Monica Rial
Whis	Masakazu Morita	Ian Sinclair
Piccolo	Toshio Furukawa	Christopher Sabat
Beerus	Kōichi Yamadera	Jason Douglas
Kikono (キコノ)	Masami Kikuchi	Sonny Franks
Berryblue (ベリブル, Beriburu)	Kimiko Saitō	Veronica Taylor
Bardock	Masako Nozawa	Sonny Strait
Beets (ビーツ, Bītsu)	Takuya Kirimoto	Anthony Bowling
King Vegeta	Banjō Ginga	Christopher Sabat
Gine (ギネ)	Naoko Watanabe	Emily Neves
Leek (リーク, Rīku)	Yōhei Azakami	Austin Tindle
King Cold	Ryūzaburō Ōtomo	Jason Douglas
Moroko (モロコ)	Hisao Egawa	Daman Mills
Daigen (ダイゲン)	Takashi Matsuyama	Ray Hurd
Raditz	Shigeru Chiba	Justin Cook
Nappa	Tetsu Inada	Phil Parsons
Taro (タロ)	Masaya Takatsuka	Marcus D. Stimac
Shito (シトウ, Shitō)	Atsuki Tani	Sonny Franks
Nion (ニオン)	Yukiko Morishita	Terri Doty
Majordomo	Shin Aomori	Barry Yandell
Zarbon	Hiroaki Miura	Christopher Sabat
Trunks	Takeshi Kusao	Alexis Tipton
Goten	Masako Nozawa	Kara Edwards
Bulla	Aya Hisakawa	Bryn Apprill
Emperor Pilaf	Shigeru Chiba	Chuck Huber
Mai	Eiko Yamada	Colleen Clinkenbeard
Shu	Tessho Genda	Chris Cason
Gogeta	Masako Nozawa; Ryō Horikawa	Sean Schemmel; Christopher Sabat
Shenron	Ryūzaburō Ōtomo	Christopher Sabat
Ba (バア, Baa)	—N/a	Brina Palencia

== Production ==
=== Development ===
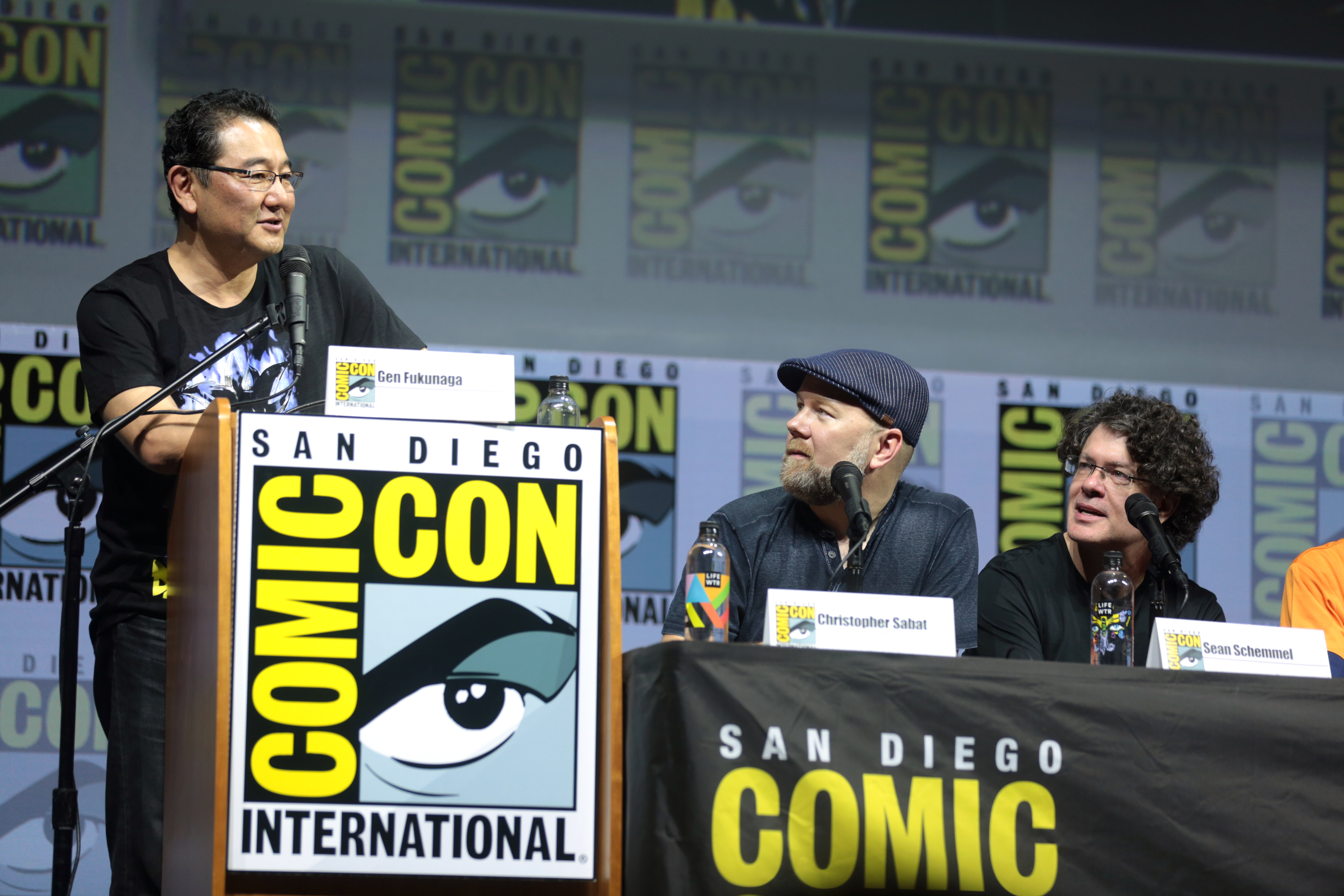
Gen Fukunaga, Christopher Sabat and Sean Schemmel speaking on the Dragon Ball Super panel at San Diego Comic-Con.

The film is produced by Toei Animation. It was originally announced under the tentative title of Dragon Ball Super - The Movie on December 17, 2017, during Jump Festa with the general theme being "The Strongest Warrior Race in the Universe, The Saiyans". A poster was released on March 13, 2018, eleven days before the airing of the final episode of Dragon Ball Super, featuring an entirely new traditional animation design by Toei animator Naohiro Shintani, as opposed to veteran Dragon Ball character designer Tadayoshi Yamamuro. One week later, the first trailer for the film was released publicly through Toei Animation featuring the all–new character designs and an enigmatic new villain. Akira Toriyama wrote the story, screenplay and designed the characters, Tatsuya Nagamine is film director, Naohiro Shintani is animation director, Kazuo Ogura is serving as art director, Rumiko Nagai as color designer, Naotake Oota is in charge of special effects, and Kai Makino is the CG director. The film includes elements of the 2014 "Dragon Ball −(Minus): The Departure of the Fated Child" story written by Toriyama.

On July 9, 2018, the film's title was revealed to be Dragon Ball Super: Broly, revealing the unknown villain to be the titular character Broly who first appeared in the 1993 film Dragon Ball Z: Broly – The Legendary Super Saiyan. Toriyama stated the character and his origin is reworked, but with his classic image in mind. With this film portrayal, the character would become part of the Dragon Ball Super official continuity. Other new characters introduced in the film are Goku's mother Gine, Kikono, Berryblue, Cheelai, and Lemo serving in Frieza's army, and the Saiyan Beets.

== Music ==
The film score was composed by Norihito Sumitomo. The original soundtrack, containing 34 tracks, was released on December 12, 2018, by Avex Trax. In August 2018, was reported a rumor that the Dragon Ball Z iconic theme song "Cha-La Head-Cha-La" would be also featured in a new arrangement. In October 2018, it was announced that Daichi Miura would perform the film's theme song "Blizzard", which was released as a single on December 19 by Sonic Groove. Three versions of the single "Blizzard" were released (CD+DVD Edition, Single CD Edition and CD "Dragon Ball Super: Broly" Cover Edition). In its first week of release the CD single sold 22,826 copies. In his sixth week in the Charts, "Blizzard" reached number two on the Billboard Japan Hot 100 and achieved the number one on the Billboard Hot Animation.

== Marketing ==
=== Promotion ===
On July 19, 2018, theatrical trailers for both the subtitled and dubbed versions were released online after being shown at San Diego Comic-Con. On October 5, 2018, the second trailer for both the subtitled and dubbed versions were released online after being shown at New York Comic Con during the Dragon Ball Super: Broly panel at the Hulu Theater at Madison Square Garden. The third trailer was released on November 7, 2018, but only subtitled, while dubbed version on December 20. The fourth which was a music trailer featuring the theme song "Blizzard" was released on November 24, 2018. The fifth and final trailer was released on November 29, 2018, with a dubbed version, also of the theme song, on December 4, 2018. Each trailer covered a different aspect of the film; the first introduced Broly and his fights against Vegeta, Goku and Frieza, the second their origin stories, the third more scenes from the fights, the fourth recapped previous scenes, and fifth which was the shortest introduced Gogeta's battle against Broly.

Beginning July 20, the first 50,000 pre-order ticket holders in Japan received a char of Goku or Vegeta. A promotional one-hour television special aired on Fuji TV in Japan on December 2, 2018, entitled "Just before the Dragon Ball Super debut! TV version climax recap".

=== Merchandise ===
In North America, anime distributor Funimation hosted the "Dragon Ball North America Tour 2018 with Bandai Collectibles" to promote the film. The tour was held in seven cities in the United States and Canada, starting with a San Diego Comic-Con panel on July 19, and ending at Dallas Fan Days on October 21, 2018. Fathom Events and Toei Animation also held two limited North American theatrical screenings of past Dragon Ball films that featured characters from Dragon Ball Super: Broly. A screening of Dragon Ball Z: Broly – The Legendary Super Saiyan (1993) was held in September 2018, while Bardock - The Father of Goku (1990) and Fusion Reborn (1995), billed together as Dragon Ball Z: Saiyan Double Feature, were screened the following November. To promote the North American release of the film, a Goku balloon was flown during the 92nd Macy's Thanksgiving Day Parade in 2018.

=== Novelization ===
A novelization of the film, written by Masatoshi Kusakabe, was released on December 14, 2018. The novel adds additional details not present in the film, such as the names of two Saiyans, Leek and Taro, who appeared early in the film. It was one of the twenty top-selling light novels of January 2019, selling 10,466 copies in Japan. The film was also adapted into an anime comic on May 2, 2019, featuring cover art by the film's animation supervisor Naohiro Shintani.

== Release ==
=== Theatrical ===
==== Premiere ====
The world premiere of Dragon Ball Super: Broly was held at the Nippon Budokan in Chiyoda, Tokyo on November 14, 2018. This event was limited to only 1,000 guests that were selected via lottery through Weekly Shōnen Jump No.47 and the December V Jump. Broly was open nationwide in Japan on December 14, 2018, while Funimation's English dub had its world premiere at TCL Chinese Theatre in Los Angeles on December 13 of that same year, followed by its United States and Canada release a month later on January 16, 2019, by Funimation Films. The film was screened in Bangladesh by Star Cineplex on January 18, 2019, making it the first anime as well as Dragon Ball film to release in the country's theater. In the United Kingdom and Ireland, Manga Entertainment screened the film theatrically from January 23, 2019. In Australia and New Zealand, Madman Entertainment screened the film theatrically from January 24, 2019, and also screened the IMAX and 4DX versions of the film in select cinemas. 20th Century Fox released the film theatrically in the Philippines on January 30, 2019.

==== Distribution ====
The film was distributed in Japan by Toei in cooperation with the Japanese branch of 20th Century Fox, who also handled distribution in some international territories making it the last film in the franchise co-distributed by Fox due the dissolution of the Japanese branch absorbed by Disney Japan in September 2020. On July 7, 2018, Funimation bought the film's international rights in the United States and Canada. In addition to regular screenings, it is also screened in IMAX, MX4D, and 4DX. The film is the first anime to be screened in IMAX in the United States, with a limited projection beginning January 16, 2019.

=== Home media ===
On April 16, 2019, Funimation released to the North American market the package of Blu-ray discs, DVD and digital combo of the film. The Blu-ray of the film debuted first, selling 298,048 copies, while the DVD debuted ninth, selling 30,216 copies and therefore, together they raised more than $6 million in retail stores of the United States in its first week of launching. The Blu-ray release contains bonus interviews with the English voice cast; Vic Mignogna was initially advertised as featuring, but his material was omitted following sexual harassment accusations made against him and his removal from future Funimation projects in response. Some viewers criticized the picture quality of Funimation's releases for adding a "green tint" to the color, which Funimation defended as being "identical" to the theatrical release.

In United Kingdom, Manga Entertainment released the DVD and Blu-ray on May 27, 2019; this version did not include the interviews featured on the American release and was not affected by the green color issues. Selecta Visión launched in Spain the regular Blu-ray / DVD editions and the Collector's Edition of the film on May 29, 2019.

The film was released in Japan in regular and limited edition DVD and Blu-ray formats on June 5, 2019. The limited editions for both formats include a bonus DVD featuring TV spot, promotional clips, world premiere event at Nippon Budokan and an event held on December 15, 2018. Also includes tin badges featuring Saiyan, 32 postcards, an original card folder and a 60-page booklet. The home video of Dragon Ball Super: Broly debuted at number 1 in the Japan's Animation DVD and Blu-ray Ranking and sold approximately 64,259 copies in its first week. For the second consecutive week, Dragon Ball Super: Broly continued to occupy the number one spot, adding another 10,291 copies. In its third week, it sold 4,540 copies approximately.

In Australia and New Zealand, Madman Entertainment released the film on DVD and Blu-ray on June 19, 2019.

== Reception ==
=== Box office ===
==== Japan ====
In its opening weekend between December 14–16, 2018, the film was shown on 467 screens in Japan, and surpassed Dragon Ball Z: Resurrection 'F' to set a new opening weekend record for the franchise. It opened at number-one at Japanese box office by dominating the weekend from December 14 to 16, selling more than 820,000 tickets and earning more than ¥1.05 billion ($9.26 million) in its first three days. In its first six days it sold more than 1 million tickets and earned ¥1.3 billion ($11.6 million). The Mainichi Shimbun newspaper reported that the film has earned more than ¥2 billion (US$18.1 million) after 11 days at the box office, being the fastest film in the franchise to hit that mark. It has also sold more than 1.5 million tickets. After three weekends, on December 31 it earned $23.6 million in Japan, and roughly $24.4 million internationally.

According to Crunchyroll, after 24 days the film earned ¥3.35 billion on 2,604,870 tickets in Japan. After 32 days of release (December 14, 2018, to January 14, 2019), the film had earned ¥3.64 billion ($33.54 million), with 2,823,215 tickets having been sold. After 38 days of release, the film's earnings had increased to ¥3.75 billion ($34.23 million) to become the highest-grossing film in the series. On seventh weekend, the film dropped from sixth to ninth place. By February 3, 2019, the film has sold 3,009,730 tickets and grossed ¥3,895,569,200 ($35.43 million) in Japan.

==== Other territories ====
After four weekends, on January 6, 2019, it was estimated to have earned $32.3 million worldwide, with $29.7 million coming from Japan and $3.3 million from five other countries, including the highest-grossing opening by a Japanese film in Brazil with $1.7 million, and by a Japanese animation film in Malaysia with $232,000. During its release on January 10 in Latin America, in Peru the film had the second best premiere in history reaching 257,420 spectators on its first day of release, only surpassed by the Avengers: Infinity War with 291,629 in 2018, as well best premiere for an animation film in Bolivia. In Argentina, Bolivia, Paraguay, Puerto Rico and Uruguay the film also debuted at number-one at the box office. In its first Latin America weekend it grossed reportedly over $6.1 million in Mexico alone, while according to Deadline Hollywood, "Peru ($2.4 million) and Argentina ($1.56 million) gave Fox its biggest opening weekend ever, followed by Chile ($1.7 million) with the industry's third biggest animation opening of all time, and in Colombia it was Fox's fourth biggest opening weekend ever at $1.5 million. In its fifth weekend ending January 13, 2019, the film grossed $19.2 million from 17 territories, becoming the weekend's third top-grossing film in international markets, behind only Bumblebee and Aquaman, which brought the film's worldwide gross to $53.5 million ahead of its United States release. On the weekend ending January 20, the international cumulative had increased to $65.9 million, holding onto the number one spot in Chile ($3 million), Peru ($3.8 million) and Ecuador. The film's gross increased to $9.5 million in Mexico, $4.3 million in Brazil, $2.6 million in Argentina and $2.4 million in Colombia. Alongside its domestic total, the worldwide gross increased to $88.7 million.

Despite limited release In the United States the film earned $7.03 million on its opening day, which was a new series record, besting Resurrection 'F''s $1.97 million. It again topped the United States box office on its second day of release with $3.3 million, for a two-day total of $10.4 million. It earned $2.39 million on Friday (January 18), earning $12.8 million total in its first three days. The film ended up grossing $9.8 million across the three-day opening weekend (and $11.94 million across the four-day MLK Weekend) to bring its domestic total up to $22.6 million in six days, far surpassing the original estimates of $11 million. In its second weekend it fell 63% to $3.6 million, finishing 10th. It became the third highest grossing anime film in the United States of all time.

Dragon Ball Super: Broly grossed over $30.7 million in the United States and Canada, and $85.8 million internationally from Fox distributed markets, for a worldwide total of over $116.5 million. It is the 11th highest grossing anime film internationally of all time.

Among non Fox distributed markets, in the United Kingdom and Ireland, it became the third highest-grossing anime film ever, earning £850,000 ($1.16 million) on its first weekend. It eventually became the second highest-grossing upon surpassing £1 million ($1.3 million).

It debuted at number 7 in Australia and number 1 in New Zealand, raising AUS$1,322,182 and $309,209 respectively. In the Netherlands, it raised €377,570 ($446,552) in its first week of release, entering at number 4. About 73,000 people saw the film on its premier on January 29 in Germany where it grossed €854,000 ($970,000). It debuted at number 3 in Spain and earned $1.82 million after its fourth weekend. It debuted at number 1 in Italy earning €1.7 million ($1.9 million) in its opening week. By its second weekend the gross had increased to €2.31 million ($2.6 million).

On March 3, 2019, the film was reported by the official Dragon Ball news site to have earned over ¥12 billion ($107 million) at the worldwide box office. By May 14, 2019, the film was reported in Toei Animations's fiscal report to have grossed over ¥13 billion ($118 million) at the worldwide box office. In China, where it released on May 24, 2019, the film debuted with a $3.1 million opening weekend. By May 27, 2019, the film has grossed $30,712,119 in the United States and Canada, and $92,363,861 in other territories, for a worldwide total of $123,075,980.

=== Critical response ===
On review aggregator Rotten Tomatoes, the film holds an approval rating of 84% based on 57 reviews, with an average rating of 7/10. The website's critical consensus reads, "Dragon Ball Super: Broly may seem like colorful chaos to newcomers, but for longtime fans, it represents this long-running franchise near its action-packed apogee." On Metacritic, which assigns a normalized rating to reviews, the film has a weighted average score of 59 out of 100 based on six critics, indicating "mixed or average reviews". According to Pia's first-day satisfaction survey of Japanese audiences, it ranked as No 1. with an audience approval rating of 92.7%, while American audiences gave the film five out of five stars on PostTrak, including a 91% positive score and 78% "definite recommend".

It received critical acclaim from the initial critical reviews by Anime News Network, IGN, and Comic Book praising the story, animation style, humour, as well as Broly for making the film a "meaningful character piece about a broken man haunted by his abuse-filled past—twisted into something he was never destined to become". In a 5 out of 5 stars review by Stuff, it was considered as the "best Dragon Ball film" with the only prominent critical point that "there are certain scenes where it transitions between 2D animation and 3D ... which can disrupt the flow of it all". Ollie Barder writing for Forbes, stated that the "only real criticism at this point is that after this solid narrative starting setup, we have a pretty hefty time jump to where we are post-Dragon Ball Super. Considering the depth and breadth of the story between these points of time, it would have been nice to have a bit more exposition to help with the pacing. However, that said, this is already a long film and we all know that we have a massive fight to look forward to". Allegra Frank of Polygon concluded that the film "gets the fundamentals of Dragon Ball extremely right, no matter where you're coming in from", with "no grand statements to be made in Dragon Ball Super: Broly, and more amusement than anxiety".

=== Accolades ===
Award	Date of ceremony	Category	Recipient(s)	Result	Ref(s)
Japan Academy Prize	March 1, 2019	Animation of the Year	Dragon Ball Super: Broly	Nominated	
Google Play Users' Choice Awards	December 3, 2019	Users' Choice Movie	Dragon Ball Super: Broly	Nominated	

== Anime comic adaptation ==
Dragon Ball Super: Broly has been adapted into an anime comic, using shots from the film put into manga format. Featuring a cover illustration by Naohiro Shintani, the single volume was released in Japan on May 2, 2019.
