= List of Dragon Ball films =

Dragon Box: The Movies, a DVD box set that includes the first seventeen animated films, released by Toei Video on April 14, 2006.

Dragon Ball is a Japanese media franchise created by Akira Toriyama in 1984. Since 1986, there have been 24 theatrical films based on the franchise, including 21 anime films produced by Toei Animation, one official live-action film, and two unofficial films.

== Background ==
=== Original run (1986–1996) ===
Theatrical event circuit films (1986–96)
1986	Curse of the Blood Rubies
1987	Sleeping Princess in Devil's Castle
1988	Mystical Adventure
1989	Dead Zone
1990	The World's Strongest
1990	The Tree of Might
1991	Lord Slug
1991	Cooler's Revenge
1992	The Return of Cooler
1992	Super Android 13!
1993	Broly – The Legendary Super Saiyan
1993	Bojack Unbound
1994	Broly – Second Coming
1994	Bio-Broly
1995	Fusion Reborn
1995	Wrath of the Dragon
1996	The Path to Power

During the franchise's original broadcast run (1986–1996), Toei produced Dragon Ball films rapidly, in some cases twice per year, to match the Japanese spring and summer vacations. Seventeen films were produced during this period—three Dragon Ball films from 1986 to 1989, thirteen Dragon Ball Z films from 1989 to 1996, and finally a tenth anniversary film that was released in 1996, and adapted the Red Ribbon arc of the original series. These films have a running time below feature length (around 45–60 minutes each) except for the 1996 film, at 80 minutes. These films were mostly alternate retellings of certain story arcs involving new characters or extra side-stories that do not correlate with the same continuity as the manga or TV series.

These were generally screened back to back with other Toei films for that season as special theatrical events in Japan. The first through fifth films were shown at the Toei Manga Festival (東映まんがまつり, Tōei Manga Matsuri), while the sixth through seventeenth films were shown at the Toei Anime Fair (東映アニメフェア, Toei Anime Fea). By 1996, the first sixteen anime films up until Dragon Ball Z: Wrath of the Dragon (1995) had sold 50 million tickets and grossed over ¥40 billion ($501 million) at the Japanese box office, making it the highest-grossing anime film series up until then, in addition to selling over 500,000 home video units in Japan.

While the majority of these films were only screened in Japan, Dragon Ball Z: The Return of Cooler (1992) and Dragon Ball Z: Fusion Reborn (1995) were both screened in the United States in 2006 to promote Fusion Reborn's dubbed DVD release that year.

=== Live-action film (2009) ===
A single live-action adaptation of the series, Dragonball Evolution, was released in 2009. The film only vaguely adapted elements from the franchise and made $56.5 million worldwide against a production cost of $30 million. It received a 15% approval rating on Rotten Tomatoes, with an average rating of 3.5/10, amid criticism for its plot elements, acting performances, and whitewashing.

Sequels to Evolution were planned. James Marsters, who played King Piccolo, said that he had signed on for three films and expressed interest in making as many as seven in a 2009 interview with IGN. However, due to the critical and commercial failure of Evolution, no sequels were ever produced. The rights to any further live-action films are currently owned by the Walt Disney Company after their acquisition of 20th Century Fox. Evolution remains the only licensed live-action film in the franchise, though two unlicensed films were released in the early 1990s.

=== Animated revival (2013–present) ===
Films with wide theatrical releases (2013–)
2013	Battle of Gods
2014
2015	Resurrection 'F'
2016–2017
2018	Broly
2019–2021
2022	Super Hero

The franchise returned with Dragon Ball Z: Battle of Gods (2013), the first animated film since 1996, and the first produced with the involvement of Akira Toriyama. The film—a sequel to the original series—became the franchise's most successful at the time and was received well by critics, earning an 88% rating on Rotten Tomatoes. Unlike the classic event circuit films, those from 2013 onwards were developed with an international theatrical release planned from the beginning by 20th Century Studios (previously known as 20th Century Fox). Battle of Gods was followed by Dragon Ball Z: Resurrection 'F' in 2015. The second film introduced Jaco to Dragon Ball, a character who had debuted in Toriyama's spin-off manga Jaco the Galactic Patrolman in 2013. These two movies were adapted on Dragon Ball Super, with the plotlines from the two films forming multi-episode arcs early in the show's broadcast.

Later movies would adopt the Super moniker, beginning with Dragon Ball Super: Broly (2018), which grossed more than $122.7 million worldwide. As of May 2023, the film is the 20th highest-grossing anime film of all time. Resurrection 'F' and Broly hold approval ratings of 83% and 82%, respectively, on Rotten Tomatoes. A second Super film, Dragon Ball Super: Super Hero, was released in 2022, earning over $86.6 million worldwide. The film is the most critically successful in the franchise to date, earning a 93% rating on Rotten Tomatoes.

== Films ==
Dragon Ball films Dragon Ball Z films Dragon Ball Super films

=== Animated ===
No.	English title (Japanese title)	Directed by	Written by	Animation directed by	Theatrical release	American release	Antagonist
1	Dragon Ball: Curse of the Blood Rubies (Dragon Ball Shenron no densetsu; ドラゴンボール 神龍の伝説)	Daisuke Nishio	Toshiki Inoue	Minoru Maeda	December 20, 1986	December 28, 1989 (Note: Dragon Ball: Curse of the Blood Rubies was originally licensed to Harmony Gold USA around December 28, 1989, who dubbed and released the film in conjunction with Dragon Ball: Mystical Adventure.) September 9, 1995 (Note: The second version was produced by Funimation as a pilot to sell the Dragon Ball series to American syndicators. It originally premiered on syndication on September 9, 1995 (along with the first episode of the "Emperor Pilaf Saga").) December 28, 2010 (Note: On April 6, 2010 Funimation announced that Dragon Ball: Curse of the Blood Rubies would be released to a bilingual DVD on July 27, 2010, but the release was delayed to December 28, 2010, 21 years to the day after Harmony Gold's dub. Funimation announced the voice cast for a new English dub of the film on November 12, 2010.)	King Gourmeth
A retelling of Dragon Ball's origins, this is a different version of the meeting of Goku, Bulma, Oolong, and Yamcha. They are all looking for the dragon balls for different reasons when they cross paths with an evil king named Gurumes, who is also looking for the dragon balls. The events of the movie take place in place of the Emperor Pilaf Saga of Dragon Ball.
2	Dragon Ball: Sleeping Princess in Devil's Castle (Doragon Bōru Majin-jō no nemuri hime; ドラゴンボール 魔神城のねむり姫)	Daisuke Nishio	Keiji Terui	Minoru Maeda	July 18, 1987	December 15, 1998 (Note: Dragon Ball: Sleeping Princess in Devil's Castle was released on December 15, 1998 in VHS and on December 6, 2005 on DVD as part of the Dragon Ball Movie Box Set.)	Lucifer
Goku and Krillin are given an assignment by Master Roshi to retrieve the sleeping princess from Lucifer by which he accept them as his students. But the mission proves to be more perilous than originally thought. The movie takes place at the start of Goku and Krillin's training under Master Roshi.
3	Dragon Ball: Mystical Adventure (Doragon Bōru: Makafushigi Dai-Bōken; ドラゴンボール 魔訶不思議大冒険)	Kazuhisa Takenouchi	Yoshifumi Yuki	Minoru Maeda	July 9, 1988	December 28, 1989 (Note: Dragon Ball: Mystical Adventure was aired on December 28, 1989, by Harmony Gold USA broadcast their dub along with Dragon Ball: Curse of the Blood Rubies.) November 21, 2000 (Note: It was redubbed by Funimation, and released on November 21, 2000 on VHS, and February 27, 2001 on DVD.)	Shen; Tao
Goku and Krillin attend the World Martial Arts Tournament for fun, which is hosted by Emperor Chiaotzu. Bora and his son Upa attempt to hide the dragon ball they found from the emperor's forces, which are under the control of the evil Shen and General Tao; and Bulma conducts her own search for the dragon balls with the help of Yamcha, Puar, and Oolong. The movie seemingly takes place during Goku and Krillin's training under Master Roshi.
4	Dragon Ball Z: Dead Zone (Doragon Bōru Zetto; ドラゴンボールZ)	Daisuke Nishio	Takao Koyama	Minoru Maeda	July 15, 1989	December 17, 1997 (Note: Dragon Ball Z: Dead Zone was released on December 17, 1997 on DVD by Pioneer.) May 31, 2005 (Note: It was re-released on May 31, 2005, on DVD and redubbed by Funimation.)	Garlic Jr.
Garlic Jr. kidnaps a young Gohan so that he may use the Dragon Ball on his hat to wish for immortality. Now Goku and his friends must rescue Gohan from Garlic Jr. and his minions.
5	Dragon Ball Z: The World's Strongest (Doragon Bōru Zetto: Kono Yo de Ichiban Tsuyoi Yatsu; ドラゴンボールZ この世で一番強いヤツ)	Daisuke Nishio	Takao Koyama	Minoru Maeda	March 10, 1990	August 26, 1998 (Note: Dragon Ball Z: The World's Strongest was released on August 26, 1998, on DVD by Pioneer.) November 14, 2006 (Note: It was re-released on November 14, 2006 on DVD and redubbed by Funimation, along with Dragon Ball Z: The Tree of Might.)	Dr. Wheelo
After Dr. Kochin frees Dr. Wheelo's lab with a wish and kidnaps Bulma, it's up to Goku and friends to defeat the scientists.
6	Dragon Ball Z: The Tree of Might (Doragon Bōru Zetto: Chikyū Marugoto Chōkessen; ドラゴンボールZ 地球まるごと超決戦)	Daisuke Nishio; Storyboarded by : Daisuke Nishio, Shigeyasu Yamauchi, Yoshihiro Ueda, Mitsuo Hashimoto & Tatsuya Orime	Takao Koyama	Minoru Maeda	July 7, 1990	November 15, 1997-November 22, 1997 (Note: Dragon Ball Z: The Tree of Might was aired in the broadcast on November 15 and 22, 1997, by Saban.) March 13, 1998 (Note: It was released on March 13, 1998, on DVD by Pioneer.) November 14, 2006 (Note: It was re-released on November 14, 2006, on DVD and redubbed by Funimation, along with Dragon Ball Z: The World's Strongest.)	Turles
Turles, a Saiyan pirate, plants a tree to absorb all life on Earth, leading Goku to stop the former from using the tree.
7	Dragon Ball Z: Lord Slug (Doragon Bōru Zetto Sūpā Saiyajin da Son Gokū; ドラゴンボールZ 超スーパーサイヤ人だ孫悟空)	Mitsuo Hashimoto	Takao Koyama	Katsuyoshi Nakatsuru & Masaki Satô	March 9, 1991	August 7, 2001 (Note: Dragon Ball Z: Lord Slug was produced by Funimation and released to VHS and DVD on August 7, 2001.)	Slug
Lord Slug uses the Dragon Balls to restore his youth. Now it is up to Goku and his friends to stop the newly rejuvenated Slug from taking over the Earth.
8	Dragon Ball Z: Cooler's Revenge (Doragon Bōru Zetto: Tobikkiri no Saikyō tai Saikyō; ドラゴンボールZ とびっきりの最強対最強)	Mitsuo Hashimoto	Takao Koyama	Minoru Maeda	July 20, 1991	January 22, 2002 (Note: Dragon Ball Z: Cooler's Revenge was released on DVD and VHS on January 22, 2002, by Funimation. In 1996, Creative Products Corporation made an English dub for the Philippines with the title Dragon Ball Z: The Greatest Rivals. It was shown in theaters and was released on VHS there.)	Cooler
Cooler comes to Earth looking to avenge the death of his brother Frieza.
9	Dragon Ball Z: The Return of Cooler (Doragon Bōru Zetto Gekitotsu!! Hyaku-Oku Pawā no Senshi-tachi; ドラゴンボールZ 激突!!100億パワーの戦士たち)	Daisuke Nishio	Takao Koyama	Minoru Maeda	March 7, 1992	August 13, 2002 (Note: Dragon Ball Z: The Return of Cooler was released on DVD in the United States on August 13, 2002, by Funimation.)	Metal Cooler
Cooler returns to take over New Namek, so Goku and his friends must deal with him once more.
10	Dragon Ball Z: Super Android 13! (Doragon Bōru Zetto Kyokugen Batoru! San Dai Sūpā Saiyajin; ドラゴンボールZ 極限バトル!三大超サイヤ人) (Note: Also known as Extreme Battle! The Three Great Super Saiyans)	Daisuke Nishio	Takao Koyama	Minoru Maeda	July 11, 1992	February 4, 2003 (Note: Dragon Ball Z: Super Android 13! was released in North America on DVD by Funimation on February 4, 2003.)	Android #13
Dr. Gero's computer creates three new androids to kill Goku, Now the Z Fighters must deal with them.
11	Dragon Ball Z: Broly – The Legendary Super Saiyan (Doragon Bōru Zetto Moetsukiro!! Nessen Ressen Chō-Gekisen; ドラゴンボールZ 燃えつきろ!!100熱戦・烈戦・超激戦) (Note: Also known as Dragon Ball Z: Burn Up!! A Close Fight - A Violent Fight – A Super Fierce Fight and Dragon Ball Z: The Burning Battles)	Shigeyasu Yamauchi	Takao Koyama	Tadayoshi Yamamuro	March 6, 1993	August 26, 2003 (Note: Dragon Ball Z: Broly – The Legendary Super Saiyan was released on August 26, 2003, on DVD by Funimation.)	Broly
After being invited to a New Planet Vegeta, the Z Fighters come into conflict with Paragus and his son, The Legendary Super Saiyan, Broly.
12	Dragon Ball Z: Bojack Unbound (Doragon Bōru Zetto: Ginga Giri-Giri!! Butchigiri no Sugoi Yatsu; ドラゴンボールZ 銀河ギリギリ!!100ぶっちぎりの凄い奴) (Note: Also known as Dragon Ball Z: The Galaxy's at the Brink!! The Super Incredible Guy)	Yoshihiro Ueda	Takao Koyama	Tadayoshi Yamamuro	July 10, 1993	August 17, 2004 (Note: Dragon Ball Z: Bojack Unbound was released on DVD on August 17, 2004, by Funimation.)	Bojack
Bojack and his gang invade a martial arts tournament after being sealed away, now Gohan and the Z Fighters must stop the aliens.
13	Dragon Ball Z: Broly – Second Coming (Doragon Bōru Zetto Kiken na Futari! Sūpā Senshi wa Nemurenai; ドラゴンボールZ 危険なふたり!超戦士はねむれない) (Note: Also known as The Dangerous Duo! Super Warriors Never Rest and Dragon Ball Z: Dangerous Rivals)	Shigeyasu Yamauchi	Takao Koyama	Tadayoshi Yamamuro	March 12, 1994	April 5, 2005 (Note: Dragon Ball Z: Broly – Second Coming was released in North America on April 5, 2005, on DVD by Funimation.)	Broly
Broly survives his defeat and returns to take down Gohan, Goten and Trunks.
14	Dragon Ball Z: Bio-Broly (Doragon Bōru Zetto Sūpā Senshi Gekiha!! Katsu No wa Ore da; ドラゴンボールZ 超戦士撃破!!100勝つのはオレだ) (Note: Also known as Dragon Ball Z Super Warrior Defeat!! I'll Be The Winner and Dragon Ball Z: Attack! Super Warriors)	Yoshihiro Ueda	Takao Koyama	Tadayoshi Yamamuro	July 9, 1994	September 13, 2005 (Note: Dragon Ball Z: Bio-Broly was released on September 13, 2005, on DVD by Funimation.)	Bio-Broly
As a scientist clones Broly making it merge with a bio-fluid, Goten, Trunks and Krillin must deal with the creature.
15	Dragon Ball Z: Fusion Reborn (Dragon Ball Z Fukkatsu no Fusion!! Goku to Vegeta; ドラゴンボールZ 復活のフュージョン!!100悟空とベジータ)	Shigeyasu Yamauchi	Takao Koyama	Tadayoshi Yamamuro	March 4, 1995	March 17, 2006 (Note: Dragon Ball Z: Fusion Reborn received a theatrical release as a double feature with the special Dragon Ball Z: Bardock – The Father of Goku (1990), under the title Dragon Ball Z: Saiyan Double Feature.) (Note: Dragon Ball Z: Fusion Reborn was released on September 17, 2006, by Funimation.)	Janemba
A monster Janemba invades the other world as Goku, Vegeta and Pikkon deal with it while Gohan, Goten and Trunks save the city from some past enemies.
16	Dragon Ball Z: Wrath of the Dragon (Dragon Ball Z Ryū-Ken Bakuhatsu!! Gokū ga Yaraneba Dare ga Yaru; ドラゴンボールZ 龍拳爆発!!100悟空がやらねば誰がやる) (Note: Also known as Dragon Ball Z: Explosion of Dragon Punch)	Mitsuo Hashimoto	Takao Koyama	Tadayoshi Yamamuro	July 15, 1995	September 12, 2006 (Note: Dragon Ball Z: Wrath of the Dragon was released on September 12, 2006, on DVD by Funimation.)	Hoi Hirudegarn
A hero trapped in a music box warns the Z Fighters about an approaching evil beast who wants to stop them.
17	Dragon Ball: The Path to Power (Doragon Bōru Saikyō e no Michi; ドラゴンボール 最強への道)	Shigeyasu Yamauchi	Aya Matsui	Tadayoshi Yamamuro	March 4, 1996	April 29, 2003 (Note: Dragon Ball: The Path to Power was released on VHS and DVD on April 29, 2003, by Funimation.)	Commander Red; Assistant Black
A retelling of the original Dragon Ball merging elements from the Pilaf and Red Ribbon sagas.
18	Dragon Ball Z: Battle of Gods (Doragon Bōru Zetto: Kami to Kami; ドラゴンボールZ 神と神)	Masahiro Hosoda; Storyboarded by : Kimitoshi Chioka, Tadayoshi Yamamuro, Kazuhisa Takenouchi & Masahiro Hosoda	Written by : Yusuke Watanabe; Story by : Akira Toriyama	Takeo Ide, Yōsuke Yabumoto, Ryō Ōnishi, Toshiyuki Kan'no, Masahiro Shimanuki & Yūichi Hamano; Tadayoshi Yamamuro (chief)	March 30, 2013	August 5, 2014	Beerus
When the God of Destruction Beerus reawakens, he ventures the universe for the prophesied Super Saiyan God which leads him to Goku.
19	Dragon Ball Z: Resurrection 'F' (Doragon Bōru Zetto: Fukkatsu no 'Efu'; ドラゴンボールZ 復活の「F(エフ)」)	Tadayoshi Yamamuro	Akira Toriyama	Tadayoshi Yamamuro (Chief animation director); Takeo Ide; Kōji Nashizawa; Yūki Hayashi; Masahiro Shimanuki; Miyako Tsuji; Kōdai Watanabe	April 11, 2015	August 4, 2015 (Note: Dragon Ball Z: Resurrection 'F' was released in North America on August 4, 2015, by Funimation and 20th Century Fox.)	Frieza
After his army resurrected him using the Dragon Balls, Frieza vows revenge against Goku by leading a second invasion on Earth.
20	Dragon Ball Super: Broly (Doragon Bōru Sūpā: Burorī; ドラゴンボール超スーパー ブロリー)	Tatsuya Nagamine; Storyboarded by : Tatsuya Nagamine, Kazuya Karasawa & Masato Mitsuka	Akira Toriyama	Naohiro Shintani (Chief animation director); Miyako Tsuji; Yūya Takahashi; Yukiko Nakatani; Takeo Ide; Naoki Tate; Kōdai Watanabe	November 14, 2018	January 16, 2019 (Note: Dragon Ball Super: Broly was released in North America on January 16, 2019, by Funimation and 20th Century Fox.)	Broly
Following the Tournament of Power, Saiyan survivors Broly and his father Paragus are rescued by the Frieza force and join Frieza in his revenge against Goku while Paragus vows revenge against Vegeta due to his history with Vegeta's father, King Vegeta.
21	Dragon Ball Super: Super Hero (Doragon Bōru Sūpā: Sūpāhīrō; ドラゴンボール超：スーパーヒーロー)	Tetsurō Kodama; Storyboarded by : Tetsurō Kodama, Kazuo Sakai, Shinji Ishihira, Naotoshi Shida, Susumu Nishizawa, Susumu Mitsunaka	Akira Toriyama	Chikashi Kubota (Chief animation director); Hideaki Maniwa; Naohiro Shintani	June 11, 2022	August 19, 2022	Red Ribbon Army; Gamma 1 Gamma 2 Cell MAX
While Goku, Vegeta, and Broly are busy training with Whis, Piccolo and Gohan must defend the Earth from a new resurgence of the Red Ribbon Army.

=== Live-action ===
No.	English title	Director	Writer	American release	Japanese release
3	Dragonball Evolution	James Wong	Ben Ramsey	April 10, 2009	March 10, 2009
In Dragonball Evolution, a young Goku discovers his past and sets out to fight the evil alien warlord Lord Piccolo, who wishes to gain the powerful Dragon Balls with his assistant, Mia, and use them to take over Earth.

== Unlicensed films ==
No.	English title (Korean title)	Director	Writer	South Korea release
1	Dragon Ball: Son Goku Fights, Son Goku Wins (Deulaegonbol Ssawola Son O-gong Igyeola Son O-gong; 싸워라 손오공 이겨라 손오공)	Ryong Wang	Akira Toriyama; Seok-hun Yun	December 12, 1990
The young warrior Son Goku goes on an outrageous quest to acquire seven magical orbs, along the way beating up evil persons who want to steal the orbs for their own ends.

No.	English title (Mandarin Chinese title)	Director	Writer	American release	Taiwan release
2	Dragon Ball: The Magic Begins (Xīn Qīlóng Zhū Shénlóng de Chuánshuō; 新七龍珠 神龍的傳說)	Chun-Liang Chen	Ching-Kang Yao; Akira Toriyama	June 13, 2000	November 1991
An evil alien searches the Earth for seven "Dragon Pearls" which can grant him ultimate power. A gang of misfit adventurers band together to stop him.

== Reception ==
In commemoration of the release of the 20th film, an official online poll asked 6,000 Japanese fans to pick their favorite film in the franchise. The top five films were (from first to fifth): Dragon Ball Z: Fusion Reborn, Dragon Ball Z: Battle of Gods, Dragon Ball Z: Broly – The Legendary Super Saiyan, Dragon Ball Z: Resurrection 'F', Dragon Ball Z: The Return of Cooler.

=== Critical response ===
Film	Rotten Tomatoes	Metacritic
Dragonball Evolution	14% (63 reviews)	45 (10 reviews)
Dragon Ball Z: Battle of Gods	89% (9 reviews)	—N/a
Dragon Ball Z: Resurrection 'F'	83% (18 reviews)	—N/a
Dragon Ball Super: Broly	84% (57 reviews)	59 (6 reviews)
Dragon Ball Super: Super Hero	95% (58 reviews)	65 (12 reviews)
