= Chafurin =

Japanese actor and narrator (born 1961)

- 茶風林
- Born: Hirotaka Shimazawa (島沢 弘隆); December 4, 1961 (age 64)
- Education: Toyo University
- Occupations: Actor; voice actor; narrator
- Agent: Office Osawa
- Website: Official profile

Hirotaka Shimazawa (島沢 弘隆, Shimazawa Hirotaka; born December 4, 1961), better known by his stage name Chafurin (茶風林, Chafūrin) is a Japanese actor and narrator affiliated with Office Osawa.

A graduate of Toyo University, he often portrays middle-aged or older characters in anime.

== Filmography ==
=== Television animation ===
- Chibi Maruko-chan (1990), Kimio Nagasawa, Hideji Saijo
- Dororonpa! (1991), Monakan Daifukuji (大福寺藻奈寛)
- Mobile Suit Victory Gundam (1993), Romero Marvall
- Shippū! Iron Leaguer (1993), Bull Armor
- Fatal Fury 2: The New Battle (1993), Cheng Sinzan
- The Brave of Gold Goldran (1995), Advenger
- Bonobono (1995), Shimarisu-kun's father
- Ping-Pong Club (1995), Kaoru Suematsu, Principal, Suzuki, others
- Great Detective Conan (1996), Inspector Jūzō Megure
- Rurouni Kenshin (1996), Kuro
- The Vision of Escaflowne (1996), Mole Man
- Slayers NEXT (1996), Tarimu
- Beast Wars (1996), Cicadacon
- Dragon Ball GT (1996), Liang Xing Long
- KochiKame: Tokyo Beat Cops (1996), Yōichi Terai (First season, ~Episode 97)
- The King of Braves GaoGaiGar (1997), Arm Primeval (ZX-07)
- Slayers TRY (1997), Almayce
- Berserk (1997), Ubik
- B-Robo Kabutack (1997), Spidon
- Seijuu Sentai Gingaman (1998), Barreled Scholar Bucrates
- Lost Universe (1998), Roy Glen
- Flint the Time Detective (1998), Maito
- Cowboy Bebop (1998), Harrison
- Gregory Horror Show (1999), Gregory
- Argento Soma (2000), Dr. Ernest Noguchi
- Cyborg 009: The Cyborg Soldier (2001), 006, Chang Changku
- Naruto (2002), Fukuyokana (Ep. 174)
- F-Zero: GP Legend (2003), Don Genie
- Gungrave (2003), Bob Poundmax
- Bleach (2004), Grand Fisher
- Ah! My Goddess (2005), Mao Za Haxon
- The Law of Ueki (2005), Director
- Hell Girl (2005), Erguro
- Doraemon (2005), Mr. Emba
- Bakegyamon (2006), Neido
- Higurashi When They Cry (2006), Kuraudo Ōishi
- Otogi-Jushi Akazukin (2006), Weird Old Tree
- Death Note (2006), Hitoshi Demegawa
- Kekkaishi (2007), Lord Uro
- Gintama (2007), Henpeita Takechi
- Okane ga nai (2007), Hayashida
- Hakushaku to Yōsei (2008), Tomkins
- One Piece (2009), Charloss
- Lupin the 3rd vs. Detective Conan (2009), Inspector Jūzō Megure
- Umineko no Naku Koro ni (2009), Policeman
- Stitch! (2009), Mabuitokkae, Elastico
- Tomica Hero Rescue Fire (2009), Sakaen
- Tensou Sentai Goseiger (2010), Yuumajuu Makuin of the Globster (Eps. 16–32)
- Nura: Rise of the Yokai Clan (2010), Minagoroshi Jizou
- Coppelion (2013), Mushanokōji
- Wizard Barristers (2014), Tobiro Kamakiri
- Sazae-san (2014), Namihei Isono (Second voice)
- Tenkai Knights (2014), Beag
- Magic Kaito 1412 (2014), Inspector Jūzō Megure
- Garo: The Animation (2014), Gael
- Mobile Suit Gundam: The Origin (2015), Jimba Ral
- Tonkatsu DJ Agetarō (2016), DJ Big Master Fly
- 91 Days (2016), Orco
- Crayon Shin-chan Gaiden: Omocha Wars (2016-2017), Middle Aged Mask
- Baki (2018), Spec
- Kaitou Sentai Lupinranger VS Keisatsu Sentai Patranger en Film (2018), Wilson
- Higurashi: When They Cry, Gou (2020), Kuraudo Ōishi
- Higurashi: When They Cry, Sotsu (2021), Kuraudo Ōishi
- Yashahime: Princess Half-Demon (2021), Hachiemon
- Love After World Domination (2022), Professor Big Gelato
- Tomodachi Game (2022), Manabu-sensei
- Detective Conan: The Culprit Hanzawa (2022), Inspector Jūzō Megure
- The Diary of Ochibi-san (2023), Ojii
- The Eminence in Shadow 2nd Season (2023), Garter Kikuchi
- Brave Bang Bravern! (2024), Pessimism
- No Longer Allowed in Another World (2024), Thomas
- With You and the Rain (2025), Veterinarian
- The Ghost in the Shell (2026), Minister of Internal Affairs

=== Theatrical animation ===
- Fatal Fury: The Motion Picture (1994), Cheng Sinzan
- Dragon Ball Z: Broly – Second Coming (1994), Maloja
- Dragon Ball Z: Bio-Broly (1994), Maloja
- Detective Conan films (1997–), Inspector Jūzō Megure
- Berserk: The Golden Age Arc (2012), Torturer
- Lupin the 3rd vs. Detective Conan: The Movie (2013), Inspector Jūzō Megure
- Your Name (2016), Tessie's father
- Child of Kamiari Month (2021), Kotoshironushi
- Bright: Samurai Soul (2021), Tsukuyomi
- Gold Kingdom and Water Kingdom (2023), Piripappa
- Sand Land (2023), King
- Armored Trooper VOTOMS: Die Graue Hexe (2026), Soltig van Gunnar

=== Original video animation (OVA) ===
- Mobile Suit Gundam 0083: Stardust Memory (1991), Bernard Monsha
- Adventure Kid (1992), Kingan
- Sonic the Hedgehog (1996), Butler
- Chrono Trigger (1996), Nu
- Fullmetal Alchemist: Brotherhood OVA: The Chronicle of Teacher (2010), Gold Steiner

=== Original net animation (ONA) ===
- A Herbivorous Dragon of 5,000 Years Gets Unfairly Villainized (2024), Pravas

=== Video games ===
- Langrisser III (1996), Silver Wolf, Wilder
- Ganbare Goemon: Neo Momoyama Bakufu no Odori (1997)
- Saint of Braves Baan Gaan (1998), Private detective
- Gungrave (2002), Bob Poundmax
- Jak II (2003), Krew (Japanese dub)
- Star Ocean: Till the End of Time (2003), Guildmaster, Wolter
- Baten Kaitos: Eternal Wings and the Lost Ocean (2003), Emperor Geldoblame
- Gregory Horror Show: Soul Collector (2003), Gregory
- Crash Nitro Kart (2004), Nitros Oxide (Quinton Flynn)
- Radiata Stories (2005), Gawain Rothschild
- Jak X: Combat Racing (2005), Krew (Japanese dub)
- Grandia III (2005), La-Ilim
- Baten Kaitos Origins (2006), Geldoblame
- Tales of Symphonia: Dawn of the New World (2008), Magner
- Muramasa: The Demon Blade (2009), Shikami Danjyo
- Asura's Wrath (2012), Wyzen
- Bravely Default (2012), Qada
- Drakengard 3 (2013), Octa
- Sonic Lost World (2013), Zomom
- Granblue Fantasy (2014), Marquiares
- Dragon Quest Heroes II (2016), Torneco
- Metal Gear Survive (2018), Dan
- Onmyōji Arena (2018), Ebisu
- Crash Bandicoot 4: It's About Time (2020), Nitros Oxide
- Resident Evil Village (2021), The Duke
- Fate/Samurai Remnant (2023), Crimson Codex
- Sly Cooper, Panda King (Japanese dub)
- Super Robot Wars series, Bernard Monsha, Karasu, Arm Primeval, Combined Primeval, Alkaid Naash

=== Tokusatsu ===
- Dennou Keisatsu Cybercop (1988), Doberman V109, Salamander

== Dubbing ==
Original year	Dub year	Title	Role	Original actor	Notes
1953	2022	Roman Holiday	Hennessy	Hartley Power	
1964	2006	Goldfinger	Auric Goldfinger	Gert Fröbe	
1973		Charlotte's Web	Narrator	Rex Allen	
1980	2021	Somewhere in Time	Arthur Biehl	Bill Irwin	
1983		Shirt Tales	Genie		Episode: "Digger's Three Wishes"
1984	1998	Indiana Jones and the Temple of Doom	Lao Che	Roy Chiao	
1988–1994		Garfield and Friends	Garfield	Lorenzo Music	Cartoon Network edition
1989	1991	The Abyss	Jammer Willis	John Bedford Lloyd	
1990		Dark Angel	Boner	Michael J. Pollard	
1992		Nemesis	Marion, Interrogating Cyborg	Thom Mathews, Sven-Ole Thorsen	
1993–1995		Mighty Morphin Power Rangers	Ernie, Finster	Richard Genelle, Robert Axelrod	
1993–1999		Homicide: Life on the Street	Stanley Bolander	Ned Beatty	
1994		Airheads	Officer Wilson	Chris Farley	
1995		Demon Knight	Deputy Bob	Gary Farmer	
1995		Desperado	Tavo	Tito Larriva	
1995		Vampire in Brooklyn	Lizzy, Choir Leader	John LaMotta, Troy Curvey Jr.	
1995	1999	Die Hard with a Vengeance	Jerry Parks	Joe Zaloom	
1996	2000	Jingle All the Way	Tony the Elf, DJ	Danny Woodburn, Martin Mull	
1996	1999	The Rock	Captain Frye	Gregory Sporleder	
1997	2000	Con Air	Dale, Old Man Under Truck	Dennis Burkley, Dabbs Greer	
1997–1998		Superman: The Animated Series	Mr. Mxyzptlk	Gilbert Gottfried	
1998		Fallen	Jonesy	John Goodman	
1998		Escape from Absolom	King	Ian McNeice	
1998		Lock, Stock and Two Smoking Barrels	Gary, Mickey	Victor McGuire, Ronnie Fox	
1998		Interview with the Vampire	Gambler	John McConnell	
1998	2002	Out of Sight	Chino	Luis Guzmán	
1998–1999		Recess	Galileo	Eric Idle	
1999		Bicentennial Man	Dennis Mansky	Stephen Root	
1999		Deep Blue Sea	Preacher	LL Cool J	
1999		The Nuttiest Nutcracker	Gramps	Jim Cummings	
2000		Nurse Betty	Ballard	Pruitt Taylor Vince	
2000		In the Mood for Love	Ah Ping	Siu Ping-Lam	
2000		The Little Mermaid II: Return to the Sea	Dash	Stephen Furst	
2000–2001		Buzz Lightyear of Star Command	Booster Sinclair	Stephen Furst	
2001		Amélie	Dominique Bretodeau	Maurice Bénichou	
2001		Ocean's Eleven	Frank Catton	Bernie Mac	
2001		Monsters, Inc.	George Sanderson	Sam Black	
2001		Dr. Dolittle 2	Eugene Wilson	Andy Richter	
2001–2004		Samurai Jack	Farmer		
2001–2005		Star Trek: Enterprise	Doctor Phlox	John Billingsley	
2002		Catch Me If You Can	Paul Morgan	Steve Eastin	
2002		Die Another Day	Vladimir Popov, Mister Chang	Mikhail Gorevoy, Ho Yi	
2002		The Santa Clause 2	Easter Bunny	Jay Thomas	
2002		We Were Soldiers	Sgt. Ernie Savage	Ryan Hurst	
2002		Ice Age	Frank	Stephen Root	
2003		Daredevil	Franklin "Foggy" Nelson	Jon Favreau	
2003		Out of Time	Chae	John Billingsley	
2003		Dreamcatcher	Barry Neiman	C. Ernst Harth	
2003		Sinbad: Legend of the Seven Seas	Rat	Adriano Giannini	
2004		Shaun of the Dead	Ed	Nick Frost	
2004		DodgeBall: A True Underdog Story	Gordon	Stephen Root	
2004		Ocean's Twelve	Frank Catton	Bernie Mac	
2004		Harry Potter and the Prisoner of Azkaban	Peter Pettigrew	Timothy Spall	
2005		Harry Potter and the Goblet of Fire	Peter Pettigrew	Timothy Spall	
2005		Stuart Little 3: Call of the Wild	Beaver	Charlie Adler	
2005–2017		Ben 10 series	Zombozo	John Kassir, John DiMaggio	
2006		Pumpkinhead: Ashes to Ashes	Bunt Wallace	Douglas Roberts	
2006		Arthur and the Invisibles	Ernest Davido	Adam LeFevre	
2007		Hot Fuzz	Danny Butterman	Nick Frost	
2007		Before the Devil Knows You're Dead	Andy Hanson	Philip Seymour Hoffman	
2007		The Mist	Ollie Weeks	Toby Jones	
2007		Shooter	Senator Charles F. Meachum	Ned Beatty	
2007		Ocean's Thirteen	Frank Catton	Bernie Mac	
2007		Transformers	Bobby Bolivia	Bernie Mac	
2007		Harry Potter and the Order of the Phoenix	Peter Pettigrew	Timothy Spall	
2007		Ratatouille	Émile	Peter Sohn	
2008		Meet the Spartans	Dilio	Jareb Dauplaise	
2008–2011		Batman: The Brave and the Bold	Dr. Watson	Jim Piddock	
2009		Harry Potter and the Half-Blood Prince	Peter Pettigrew	Timothy Spall	
2010		Alice in Wonderland	Cheshire Cat	Stephen Fry	
2010		Gulliver's Travels	Jinks	James Corden	
2010		Yogi Bear	Yogi Bear	Dan Aykroyd	
2010		Harry Potter and the Deathly Hallows – Part 1	Peter Pettigrew	Timothy Spall	
2010		Legend of the Guardians: The Owls of Ga'Hoole	Twilight	Anthony LaPaglia	
2010–2013		The Big C	Paul Jamison	Oliver Platt	
2011		Paul	Clive Gollings	Nick Frost	
2011		Attack the Block	Ron	Nick Frost	
2011		Harry Potter and the Deathly Hallows – Part 2	Peter Pettigrew	Timothy Spall	
2011		Rango	Merrimack	Stephen Root	
2011		The Muppets	Rowlf the Dog	Bill Barretta	
2012		Snow White and the Huntsman	Nion	Nick Frost	
2012		Stolen	Tim Harland	Danny Huston	
2012		Transformers: Prime	General Bryce	Robert Forster	
2013		The World's End	Andy Knightley	Nick Frost	
2013		One Chance	Paul Potts	James Corden	
2013	2015	Legends of Oz: Dorothy's Return	Wiser the Owl	Oliver Platt	
2014		Cuban Fury	Bruce	Nick Frost	
2015		Heidi	Grandfather	Bruno Ganz	
2015		Hotel Transylvania 2	Bela	Rob Riggle	
2015		Transformers: Robots in Disguise	Octopunch	Ted Biaselli	
2016		The Huntsman: Winter's War	Nion	Nick Frost	
2016		Alice Through the Looking Glass	Cheshire Cat	Stephen Cat	
2016		Tom and Jerry: Back to Oz	Nome King	Jason Alexander	
2017		Journey to the West: The Demons Strike Back	Tang Sanzang's Teacher	Cheng Sihan	
2017		Mr. Moll and the Chocolate Factory	Papa Moll	Stefan Kurt	
2017		Smurfs: The Lost Village	Papa Smurf	Mandy Patinkin	
2018		Tomb Raider	Pawnbroker Alan	Nick Frost	
2018		Slaughterhouse Rulez	Woody Chapman	Nick Frost	
2018		The Nutcracker and the Four Realms	Hawthorne	Eugenio Derbez	
2019		Wonder Park	Steve	John Oliver	
2020		Trolls World Tour	King Peppy	Walt Dohrn	
2021		Staged	Nick Frost	Nick Frost	
2021		Coming 2 America	Oha	Paul Bates	
2021	2022	Jellystone!	Yogi Bear	Jeff Bergman	
2022		Strange World	Narrator	Alan Tudyk	
2022		Tom and Jerry: Snowman's Land	Larry	Kevin Michael Richardson	
2025		Smurfs	Papa Smurf	John Goodman	
