= Dragon Ball Z: Bio-Broly =

- Theatrical release poster
- Directed by: Yoshihiro Ueda
- Screenplay by: Takao Koyama
- Based on: Dragon Ball by Akira Toriyama
- Starring: See Voice cast
- Music by: Shunsuke Kikuchi
- Production companies: Toei Animation; Toei Company, Ltd
- Distributed by: Toei Company
- Release date: July 9, 1994
- Running time: 46 minutes
- Country: Japan
- Language: Japanese
- Box office: ¥1.9 billion (Japan)

Dragon Ball Z: Bio-Broly, known in Japan as Dragon Ball Z: Sūpā Senshi Gekiha!! Katsu no wa Ore da (Japanese: ドラゴンボールZ 超戦士撃破!!勝つのはオレだ; lit. 'Dragon Ball Z: Defeat the Super Warrior!! I'll Be the Winner'), (Note: Also known by Toei's own English title Dragon Ball Z: Attack! Super Warriors.) is a 1994 Japanese animated science fiction martial arts film and the eleventh Dragon Ball Z feature film. It was released in Japan on July 9 at the Toei Anime Fair alongside Dr. Slump and Arale-chan: N-cha!! Excited Heart of Summer Vacation and the second Slam Dunk film. It is the third Dragon Ball Z film to feature the character of Broly, albeit as a genetic clone. It was preceded by Dragon Ball Z: Broly – Second Coming and followed by Dragon Ball Z: Fusion Reborn.

== Plot ==
In a laboratory, humanoids emerge from tanks after having been created by the scientist Dr. Collie whose employer, Mr. Jaguar, plans to use these humanoids to expose the "world's greatest fraud", and laughs madly as a muscular, nude man with a tail lays dormant in another tank.

Android 18 harasses Mr. Satan as he has yet to pay her for purposely losing to him in the World Martial Arts Tournament final while Krillin, Trunks, Goten and Marron wait outside. A businessman named Men-Men arrives and speaks with Mr. Satan, telling him that Mr. Jaguar, who was Mr. Satan's rival at summer camp, has requested his presence on his island laboratory to have him fight his special fighters, and threatens to expose Mr. Satan as a bed wetter if he refuses. Mr. Satan reluctantly accepts with Android 18 accompanying them to make sure Mr. Satan keeps good on his promise for payment. Trunks and Goten stow away, hoping to find a challenging fight.

On the island, a tournament is organized to pit Jaguar's bio-warriors against Mr. Satan. Android 18, Goten and Trunks ask to take part by posing as his pupils. Goten and Trunks easily defeat the bio-warriors and they observe the excommunicated shaman from the village they encountered during their fight with Broly. Trunks and Goten explore the lab and find a tank which appears to house Broly who is supposed to be dead. They confront the shaman who tells them that after Broly was killed, he found a sample of the Legendary Super Saiyan's blood and took it to Jaguar, who used it to have a clone created. Goten and Trunks attempt to destroy the clone but he breaks out of the tank and attacks them. The ensuing struggle causes a major leak of a dangerous bio-fluid that instantly devours matter. The Broly clone is drenched in the bio-fluid and deformed and weakened, but is not killed. Jaguar orders Bio-Broly to kill Mr. Satan but Android 18 saves him and is subsequently defeated. Goten and Trunks battle Bio-Broly while the bio-fluid kills all of the bio-warriors, scientists, and the shaman.

Bio-Broly pummels Goten, Trunks, and Android 18. Krillin saves Android 18 but is also defeated. Trunks lures Bio-Broly beneath a bio-fluid tank and destroys it, showering Bio-Broly in more of the fluid, apparently causing him to dissolve although in reality, Bio-Broly has actually merged with the fluid and briefly re-emerged from the fluid as a giant head before disappearing again. They attempt to evacuate the island but Dr. Collie tells them that the bio-fluid will continue to spread until it covers the entire Earth. However, they discover that the fluid turns to stone upon contact with seawater, so Goten, Trunks and Krillin each fire a Kamehameha wave at the base of the island, causing a massive wave of seawater to flood the island and turn the fluid to stone. A gigantic Bio-Broly suddenly emerges from the sea but before he is able to attack, he too becomes solidified. Goten, Trunks, and Krillin blast him with a combined Kamehameha wave which destroys him for good.

In the Other World, Goku receives orders from King Kai to help Pikkon stop Broly, who has been allowed to keep his physical body and is rampaging in Hell.

== Cast ==
Character name	Voice actor	
Character name	Japanese	English
Character name	Japanese	Funimation (2005)
Goten	Masako Nozawa	Kara Edwards
Trunks	Takeshi Kusao	Laura Bailey
Bio-Broly	Bin Shimada	Vic Mignogna
Goku	Masako Nozawa	Sean Schemmel
Mr. Satan	Daisuke Gōri	Hercule (edited version)
Mr. Satan	Daisuke Gōri	Chris Rager
Kuririn	Mayumi Tanaka	Krillin
Kuririn	Mayumi Tanaka	Sonny Strait
Android 18	Miki Itō	Meredith McCoy
Jagā Batta (ジャガー・バッタ)	Naoki Tatsuta	Lord Jaguar
Jagā Batta (ジャガー・バッタ)	Naoki Tatsuta	Bill Townsley
Men-Men (メンメン, Menmen)	Keiji Fujiwara	Jim Foronda
Dr. Collie (コリー博士, Korī hakase)	Masaharu Satō	Christopher Sabat
Shaman	Chafūrin	Maloja
Shaman	Chafūrin	Robert McCollum
Nain (ナイン)	Tomiko Suzuki	Nan
Nain (ナイン)	Tomiko Suzuki	Caitlin Glass
Marron	Tomiko Suzuki	Meredith McCoy
Scientists	Hisao Egawa; Tomohisa Asō; Yoshiyuki Kōno	Robert McCollum; Eric Vale
Bio-Warriors (バイオ戦士, Baio Senshi)	—N/a	Andrew Rye; Robert Colin; Eric Vale; Michael Terry
Beast Mut	—N/a	Jeremy Inman (Note: Credited only in 2005 version.)
Bubbles	Naoki Tatsuta	Christopher Sabat
Narrator	Jōji Yanami	Kyle Hebert

=== Notes ===
Two more English dubs from Speedy Video and Solar Entertainment feature an unknown voice cast.

== Music ==
- OP (Opening Theme):
  - "We Gotta Power"
    - Lyrics by Yukinojō Mori
    - Music and arrangement by Keiju Ishikawa
    - Performed by Hironobu Kageyama
- IN (Insert Song):
  - Chīsa na Senshi~Goten to Trunks no Tēma~ (小さな戦士～悟天とトランクスのテーマ～, "The Young Warriors ~Theme of Goten and Trunks~")
    - Lyrics by Yukinojō Mori
    - Music by Tetsuji Hayashi
    - Arranged by Osamu Totsuka
    - Performed by Susumu Oya
- ED (Ending Theme):
  - Doragon Pawā Mugendai (ドラゴンパワー∞, "Dragon Power ∞")
    - Lyrics by Yukinojo Mori
    - Music by Tetsuji Hayashi
    - Arranged by Osamu Totsuka
    - Performed by Hironobu Kageyama

=== Singles ===
"Dragon Power ∞" was released as a single on 8 mm CD on July 21, 1994, in Japan. It was coupled with the image song "Chīsa na Senshi~Goten to Trunks no Tēma~" performed by Susumu Ōya.

Another CD called ~Sūpā Senshi Gekiha!! Katsu no wa Ore da~ Single +1 (～超戦士撃破！！勝つのはオレだ～Single+1, ~Super Warrior Defeat!! I'll Be the Winner~ Single + 1) was released on 12 mm CD at the same time as the 8 mm CD. This 12 mm CD features a third track, "Kung Fu Taisō" (カンフー体操), also performed by Kageyama.

=== English dub soundtrack ===
The score for the English dub's composed by Mark Menza. The Triple Feature release contains an alternate audio track containing the English dub with original Japanese background music by Shunsuke Kikuchi, an opening theme of "We Gotta Power", and an ending theme of "Dragon Power ∞".

== Releases ==
Dragon Ball Z: Bio-Broly was theatrically released in Japan on July 9, 1994. The film was released on VHS and LaserDisc in February 1995. It was first released on DVD on April 14, 2006, as part of Dragon Box The Movies, a box set that includes every Dragon Ball film released up to that point. Bio-Broly was later re-released on its own on January 9, 2009, as Dragon Ball The Movies #11. It was released on Blu-ray on December 5, 2018, as part of Dragon Ball The Movies Blu-ray #06, a two-film set that also includes Dragon Ball Z: Fusion Reborn. The jacket of the Blu-ray originally featured a disclaimer that the films contain content that "may be considered inappropriate for modern audiences" but were included as originally made out of respect for their "historical value". However, the versions of the films included were actually censored; namely, the removal of characters giving the middle finger. Toei apologized for the mistake, offered refunds, and stated that all copies shipped after January 25, 2019, would be censored, but would contain an accurate jacket that notes the films have been altered.

Funimation released the film on DVD in North America on September 13, 2005. They was later released it in a Triple Feature set along with Broly – The Legendary Super Saiyan (1993) and Broly – Second Coming (1994) for Blu-ray and DVD on March 31, 2009. Both feature 1080p format in HD remastered 16:9 aspect ratio and an enhanced 5.1 surround mix. The film was re-released to DVD by Funimation in the final remastered thinpak collection on January 3, 2012, containing the last four Dragon Ball Z films.

A second English dub produced and released exclusively in Malaysia by Speedy Video features an unknown voice cast.
