= Dragon Ball Z: Broly – The Legendary Super Saiyan =

- Theatrical release poster
- Directed by: Shigeyasu Yamauchi
- Screenplay by: Takao Koyama
- Based on: Dragon Ball by Akira Toriyama
- Starring: See below
- Music by: Shunsuke Kikuchi
- Production company: Toei Animation
- Distributed by: Toei Company
- Release date: March 6, 1993
- Running time: 72 minutes
- Country: Japan
- Language: Japanese
- Box office: ¥2.43 billion $21.7 million

Dragon Ball Z: Broly – The Legendary Super Saiyan, known in Japan as Dragon Ball Z: Moetsukiro!! Nessen Ressen Chō-Gekisen (Japanese: ドラゴンボールZ 燃えつきろ!!熱戦・烈戦・超激戦; lit. 'Dragon Ball Z: Burn!! Hot Battle - Fierce Battle - Super Intensive Battle'), (Note: Also known by Toei's own English title Dragon Ball Z: The Burning Battles.) is a 1993 Japanese anime science fiction martial arts film and the eighth Dragon Ball Z feature film. It was released in Japan on March 6, 1993, at the Toei Anime Fair alongside Dr. Slump and Arale-chan: N-cha! Clear Skies Over Penguin Village. It was dubbed into English and released by Funimation in 2003. It was preceded by Dragon Ball Z: Super Android 13! and followed by Dragon Ball Z: Bojack Unbound. The film first aired in the United States on Nicktoons on September 14, 2011.

Broly was created by Takao Koyama and was designed by series creator Akira Toriyama. This film is the first of three titular films featuring the character, followed by Broly – Second Coming and Bio-Broly in 1994. The character also appeared in Dragon Ball Z: The Real 4-D at Super Tenkaichi Budokai, a cinematic attraction at Universal Studios Japan in 2017.

In 2018, a reboot film titled Dragon Ball Super: Broly was released and served as a retelling of Broly's origins and character arc, taking place after the conclusion of the Dragon Ball Super television series.

== Plot ==
King Kai senses the destruction of the south galaxy by a Super Saiyan and realizes that the north galaxy will be targeted next. He telepathically contacts Goku, who begins tracking the Super Saiyan's energy.

On Earth, a spaceship interrupts a picnic, and an army of humanoid alien soldiers greet Vegeta. Their leader is revealed to be a Saiyan named Paragus who claims that he has created a new Saiyan planet and wishes for Vegeta to assume the throne. Vegeta agrees after Paragus tells him that the "Legendary Super Saiyan" is running rampant throughout the galaxy and must be stopped. Gohan, Future Trunks, Krillin, Master Roshi and Oolong accompany Vegeta onto the ship.

On New Vegeta, Vegeta meets Paragus's son, Broly, who joins him in tracking the Super Saiyan. Gohan, Trunks, and Krillin explore New Vegeta and discover that it is uninhabited except for alien slaves who reveal that a Super Saiyan destroyed their civilization. The masters begin to abuse them, but are fended off by Gohan and Krillin. Goku arrives and is greeted by Paragus, who recognizes him as Bardock's son and invites them to dinner at the palace. Broly is agitated at the mere sight and presence of Goku. Paragus controls his son by using a device on his bracelet that syncs to Broly's headband. Despite this, Broly attacks Goku at night, requiring Paragus to calm him. Goku suspects that Broly is the Super Saiyan, and Paragus contemplates the mind-control device and suspects that it is malfunctioning due to Broly responding aggressively to Goku. Paragus theorizes that Broly's violent Saiyan instincts are awakening due to Goku's power, then remembers they were born on the same day in an attempt to explain their fated encounter after all these years.

Goku and the others confront Paragus upon learning the truth about Broly as his aggression toward Goku swells. Broly breaks free of the mind control device and transforms into the Legendary Super Saiyan. Broly attacks Goku, who Trunks and Gohan defend, while a fearful Vegeta loses his will to fight before the Legendary Super Saiyan. Paragus taunts Vegeta while revealing that Broly was born with a power level of 10,000 and was feared by King Vegeta, who ordered Broly's execution. Paragus failed to persuade King Vegeta to spare Broly's life, who was pierced in the abdomen by a knife and left for dead with his father. At the same time, Frieza destroyed the planet that same day, where Bardock tries to defeat him unsuccessfully. Broly's survival instincts caused him to shield himself and Paragus, and they soared off into space protected by Broly's power. Broly grew unstable and sadistic as he aged. Paragus was forced to use a mind-control device to pacify his son, but planned to use him to exact his revenge on King Vegeta's bloodline and convert the Earth into New Planet Vegeta. Paragus reveals that a comet is approaching New Vegeta and will destroy it upon impact.

Goku, Gohan, and Trunks are dominated by Broly until Piccolo arrives and heals them with Senzu Beans. They engage Broly again, but continue to be severely outmatched. After being scolded by Piccolo, Vegeta's pride finally returns, and he confronts Broly, but is quickly incapacitated. Paragus prepares to escape the doomed planet in a small space pod before he is confronted and killed by Broly. Despite Broly's power continuing to increase, Goku manages to challenge him yet again, and he is mercilessly beaten as he asks his allies to lend him their ki. After much reluctance, Vegeta, despite his pride, finally gives his ki to Goku, who uses it to strike a piercing blow into Broly, causing the Legendary Super Saiyan's power to become unstable, and he explodes.

Just as the comet strikes and destroys New Vegeta, Goku, his allies, and the slaves cheer as they escape in Piccolo's spaceship to return to Earth.

== Cast ==
Character name	Voice actor		
Character name	Japanese	English	
Character name	Japanese	Unknown/AB Groupe (c. 2002)	FUNimation (2003)
Goku/Kakarot	Masako Nozawa	David Gasman; Jodi Forrest (baby)	Sean Schemmel; Stephanie Nadolny (baby)
Gohan	Masako Nozawa	Jodi Forrest	Stephanie Nadolny
Piccolo	Toshio Furukawa	Big Green	Christopher Sabat
Piccolo	Toshio Furukawa	Paul Bandey	Christopher Sabat
Kuririn	Mayumi Tanaka	Clearin	Krillin
Kuririn	Mayumi Tanaka	Sharon Mann	Sonny Strait
Trunks	Takeshi Kusao; Hiromi Tsuru (baby)	Doug Rand; Jodi Forrest (baby)	Eric Vale; Stephanie Nadolny (baby)
Vegeta	Ryō Horikawa	Ed Marcus	Christopher Sabat
Bulma	Hiromi Tsuru	Blooma	Tiffany Vollmer
Bulma	Hiromi Tsuru	Sharon Mann	Tiffany Vollmer
Broly	Bin Shimada; Hiroko Emori (baby)	Doug Rand; Jodi Forrest (baby, some scenes)	Vic Mignogna; Cynthia Cranz (baby)
Paragus (パラガス, Paragasu)	Iemasa Kayumi	Paul Bandey	Dameon Clarke
Kame-Sen'nin (Turtle Hermit)	Kōhei Miyauchi	Old Tortoise	Master Roshi
Kame-Sen'nin (Turtle Hermit)	Kōhei Miyauchi	Ed Marcus	Mike McFarland
Kaiō	Jōji Yanami	Keish	King Kai
Kaiō	Jōji Yanami	Ed Marcus	Sean Schemmel
Chi-Chi	Naoko Watanabe	Sharon Mann	Cynthia Cranz
Oolong	Naoki Tatsuta	David Gasman	Brad Jackson
Bulma's mother	Hiroko Emori	Blooma's mother	Mrs. Briefs
Bulma's mother	Hiroko Emori	Jodi Forrest	Cynthia Cranz
Dr. Brief	Jōji Yanami	Paul Bandey	Dr. Briefs
Dr. Brief	Jōji Yanami	Paul Bandey	Chris Forbis
Shamo (シャモ星人, Shamo-seijin)	Hiroko Emori	Doug Rand	Amber Cotton
Shamo's grandfather	Masaharu Satō	Ed Marcus	John Burgmeier
Octopus Scientist (タコ科学者, Tako kagaku-sha)	Naoki Tatsuta	Ed Marcus	Krang
Octopus Scientist (タコ科学者, Tako kagaku-sha)	Naoki Tatsuta	Ed Marcus	Kent Williams
Moa (モア)	Yasuhiko Kawazu	Ed Marcus	Moah
Moa (モア)	Yasuhiko Kawazu	Ed Marcus	Sean Michael Teague
King Vegeta	Masaharu Satō	Ed Marcus	Christopher Sabat
Bubbles	Naoki Tatsuta	Ed Marcus	Christopher Sabat
Narrator	Jōji Yanami	Ed Marcus	Kyle Hebert

A third English dub produced and released exclusively in Malaysia by Speedy Video features an unknown voice cast.

== Music ==
- OP (Opening Theme):
  - "Cha-La Head-Cha-La"
    - Lyrics by Yukinojō Mori
    - Music by Chiho Kiyooka
    - Arranged by Kenji Yamamoto
    - Performed by Hironobu Kageyama
- ED (Ending Theme):
  - "Burning Fight —A Close, Intense, Super-Fierce Battle—" (バーニング・ファイト―熱戦・烈戦・超激戦―, Bāningu Faito —Nessen • Ressen • Chō-Gekisen—)
    - Lyrics by Dai Satō
    - Music by Chiho Kiyooka
    - Arranged by Kenji Yamamoto
    - Performed by Hironobu Kageyama and Yuka

=== English dub soundtrack ===
The following songs were present in the Funimation dub of Dragon Ball Z: Broly – The Legendary Super Saiyan: The remaining pieces of background music were composed by Mark Menza. Several licensed songs listed here were removed in later releases due to licensing restrictions.

1. Tendril - Eternal Sacrifice (Opening Theme of Film)
2. El Gato - Lost in America (Part 1)
3. Brave Combo - Dance of the Hours (Part 1 & 2)
4. Pointy Shoe Factory - On Your Knees
5. Pointy Shoe Factory - Bump in the Night
6. Doosu - Louisiana House Fire. Mid 1950
7. The Aleph - Lazarus
8. Slow Roosevelt - Boys Lie, Girls Steal
9. Spoonfed Tribe - Beetle Orange
10. Dokodemo Doa - Fearful Yet Hopeful
11. Pointy Shoe Factory - The Dub and the Dead
12. Pantera - 10's
13. Tendril - Invisibles
14. Gravity Pool - Reach
15. Gravity Pool - Won't Give In
16. Haji's Kitchen - Day After Day
17. Slow Roosevelt - Silverback
18. Haji's Kitchen Warrior (Instrumental)
19. Haji's Kitchen - Lost
20. El Gato - Stained-Glass Windshield

The Triple Feature release contains an alternate audio track, containing the English dub with original Japanese background music by Shunsuke Kikuchi, an opening theme of "Cha-La Head-Cha-La", and an ending theme of "Burning Fight —A Close, Intense, Super-Fierce Battle—".

== Box office ==
In Japan, the film sold 3.5 million tickets and grossed ¥2.33 billion ($21 million).

On September 15 and 17, 2018, the film had a limited theatrical release by Fathom Events in the United States due to the upcoming release of Dragon Ball Super: Broly (2018). According to Box Office Mojo, as of September 19, 2018, it made a revenue of $658,982. This adds up to a total gross of $21,658,982 in Japan and the United States.

== Releases ==
In Japan, the home video release sold 40,000 units by 1996.

It was released on DVD and VHS in North America on August 26, 2003. Plus, it was released it in a bundle along with Broly – Second Coming (1994) for Blu-ray on November 13, 2007, both feature full 1080p format in HD remastered 16:9 aspect ratio and an enhanced 5.1 surround mix. It was later released in Triple Feature set with 2 Broly films and Bio-Broly (1994) for Blu-ray and DVD on March 31, 2009. The film was re-released to DVD in remastered thinpak collection on December 6, 2011, containing the second 4 Dragon Ball Z films.
