= Dragon Ball Z: Sagas =

2005 video game

- Cover art featuring Super Saiyan Goku, Frieza, and Cell
- Developer: Avalanche Software
- Publisher: Atari
- Producer: Dan DeOreo
- Artist: Charlie Rizzo
- Series: Dragon Ball Z
- Platforms: GameCube; PlayStation 2 Xbox
- Release: NA: March 22, 2005
- Genres: Action-adventure, beat 'em up
- Modes: Single-player, multiplayer

Dragon Ball Z: Sagas is a 2005 action-adventure beat 'em up video game developed by Avalanche Software and published by Atari. It is based on the anime Dragon Ball Z, adapting the Saiyan, Frieza, and Cell sagas.

Sagas is the first console Dragon Ball video game to be developed outside of Japan, the first to be released on an Xbox system, and the only to release on the original Xbox. It received mixed to negative reviews from critics.

== Gameplay ==
Sagas is a linear combat-focused game with new abilities becoming available via upgrade. There are three basic fighting styles: Melee, Combo, and Ki. Melee attacks are often swift and leave the opponent temporarily stunned. Combo attacks are several consecutive punches or kicks to the opponent which may contain up to 10 hits. Ki attacks are energy blasts that rely on a rechargeable meter for power. The most powerful Ki blast is the "Special Move" found in the first level. Each character has their own special Ki blast, but they all have very similar properties.

The stages are adapted from events in the Dragon Ball Z anime. Before each stage, a cutscene plays consisting of editied footage of the anime, serving to recap events leading into the stage in question.

== Reception ==
Scores

Aggregate scores
Aggregator	Score		
Aggregator	GameCube	PS2	Xbox
GameRankings	51.92%	48.80%	52%
Metacritic	48 / 100	49 / 100	51 / 100

Review scores
Publication	Score		
Publication	GameCube	PS2	Xbox
1Up.com	N/A	C+	N/A
Game Informer	5 / 10	5 / 10	5 / 10
GamePro	3.5/5	3.5/5	3.5/5
GameSpot	3.8 / 10	3.8 / 10	3.8 / 10
IGN	4 / 10	4 / 10	4 / 10
M! Games	N/A	44 / 100	N/A
Nintendo Power	3 / 5	N/A	N/A
Official U.S. PlayStation Magazine	N/A	2.5/5	N/A
Official Xbox Magazine (US)	N/A	N/A	5.3 / 10
TeamXbox	N/A	N/A	5.5 / 10
X-Play	2/5	2/5	2/5

Dragon Ball Z: Sagas received generally mixed to negative reviews from critics and was a commercial failure. GameRankings and Metacritic gave it a score of 52% and 51 out of 100 for the Xbox version; 52% and 48 out of 100 for the GameCube version; and 49% and 49 out of 100 for the PlayStation 2 version. IGN gave the game 4 out of 10, claiming that, "In the end, Dragon Ball Z: Sagas fails in all departments. It's nowhere near as fun or functional as the Budokai games, and completely fails in taking the series into a new direction." The reviews were mainly a result of a lack of gameplay. IGN also claims that "The lack of characters, sagas, and moves is what brings the game down. There is no reason why the very great Dragon Ball Z franchise should be taking a step backwards."
