= Dragon Ball Z: Infinite World =

2008 video game

- European box art
- Developer: Dimps
- Publishers: JP/EU: Namco Bandai Games (Note: Released under the Bandai brand name.); NA/AU: Atari
- Series: Dragon Ball; Budokai
- Platform: PlayStation 2
- Release: NA: November 4, 2008; JP: December 4, 2008; EU: December 5, 2008
- Genre: Fighting
- Modes: Single-player, multiplayer

Dragon Ball Z: Infinite World (ドラゴンボールZ インフィニットワールド, Doragon Bōru Zetto Infinitto Wārudo) is a fighting video game for the PlayStation 2 based on the Dragon Ball franchise. The game was developed by Dimps, and published in North America by Atari, and in Europe and Japan by Namco Bandai Games under the Bandai label. It was released in North America on November 4, 2008, in Japan on December 4, and in Europe the following day.

Within a week of the game's initial release in Japan, it sold 76,452 units. The game received generally mixed reviews, with some video game publications commenting on its frustrating gameplay and little difference to older Dragon Ball Z games.

== Gameplay ==
A screenshot of the gameplay, showing a fight between Goku against Super Janemba in Supreme Kai's World. The green bars at the top represent each character's health, with the yellow bars underneath it displaying the amount of ki that can be used to perform special attacks and transformations.

The game's mechanics are essentially the same as those of the Budokai series, with some elements carried over from Burst Limit. Players take control of and battle various characters from the Dragon Ball franchise. Forty-two characters are playable, in comparison with Budokai 3's thirty-eight characters.

The game's story mode, called Dragon Mission, uses a map with various objective missions icons that retell some of the battles within the manga and anime series. Players take control of their icon, a Goku avatar, by walking or running to an available mission icon. These missions range from standard and timed endurance battles. Other missions include mini games such as on-foot searches, races to reach a destination or find an item, timed button sequence responders and first person shooters.

Skill capsules are carried over from the Budokai series. They allow players to customize characters with a variety of special techniques and attributes. The capsules can be bought with Zeni, and the more of the same capsule a player buys, the stronger their effects become. This differs from the Budokai series, where skills had to be placed multiple times on a character for them to become stronger.

A mode called "Fighter's Road" becomes available after certain goals are met. Players participate in a series of battles on four of the maps from the Dragon Mission mode. Like Dragon Mission, players are rewarded a certain amount of Zeni after every victory. They are also rewarded more Zeni according to how many battles they've won when they exit.

== Development ==

The game was first announced in August 2008 by Atari's French website. The announcement stated that the game was in development by Dimps and would retain many of the qualities found in the Budokai series, yet they would include new innovations such as the Dragon Mission mode and a simplified combat system from Burst Limit. It was also promised that the game's roster would include up to forty playable characters, not including transformations and was given a European release date of sometime in December of that year. Included with the announcement were several screenshots which revealed gameplay of the combat system and four of the mini-games from both the Saiyan and Android sagas. This was followed by an announcement posted on Atari's North American page revealing that they would retain the Infinite World title and a release date sometime in November. Around the same time, V Jump announced the game would be released in Japan and that the game would also utilize the Infinite World title. In September, more information was released stating that the capsule system would be brought back and the audio would include both the English and Japanese voice talent. In October, Famitsu posted more screenshots revealing more mini-games within the Frieza and Cell sagas. On October 15, Atari released a press statement announcing that the game was completed. A few days later the game was unveiled at the Tokyo Game Show.

According to producer Riyo Mito, the game's title Infinite World implies the immense gameplay of the epic Dragon Ball universe within the game's Dragon Mission mode. The game was specifically chosen for the PlayStation 2 to target fans that did not have access to the PlayStation 3 and Xbox 360 consoles to play the previous title, Burst Limit, at the time.

== Music ==
Dragon Ball Z: Infinite World Original Soundtrack

Soundtrack album by Kenz & Canon
- Released: January 7, 2009
- Genre: Anime/Video Game
- Length: 55:08
- Language: Japanese
- Label: Lantis Records

Singles from Dragon Ball Z: Infinite World Original Soundtrack
- 1. "Hikari no Sasu Mirai e!" Released: December 25, 2008

Dragon Ball Z: Infinite World Original Soundtrack (ドラゴンボールZ インフィニットワールドオリジナルサウンドトラック, Doragon Bōru Zetto Infinitto Wārudo Orizinaru Saundotorakku) is the licensed soundtrack to the video game. Composer Kenji Yamamoto returns to provide music for the game along with Kanon Yamamoto, with both credited as Kenz and Canon respectively. There are twenty-two pieces created exclusively for the game, with the rest carried over from the previous three Budokai games. The game's theme songs "Hikari no Sasu Mirai e!" and "Dragon Ball Party" were written by Yuriko Mori and performed by Hironobu Kageyama. However, the game's North American packaging only features Kageyama as a contributor, and the game's instruction manual does not list any music credits, causing people in the gaming community, not familiar with the material, to believe that Kageyama was the game's composer. Some game critics have gone on to record in their reviews citing the music as the superior part of the game. The new music was released as Dragon Ball Z: Infinite World Original Soundtrack by Lantis on January 7, 2009, while the theme songs were released as a single by King Records on Christmas Day 2008.

Track listing:

1. "Hikari no Sasu Mirai e!" (Game OP ver.)
2. "Rock O'motion"
3. "5th Street"
4. "Shizuka Naru Tōsō" (静かなる闘争; "Quiet Struggle")
5. "Flash Battle"
6. "psychic force"
7. "Gekidō" (激動; "Agitation")
8. "Tropica"
9. "Madamada Tsuduku Michi…" (まだまだ続く道…。; "The Road Still Continues…")
10. "No Man's Island"
11. "Capsule Co."
12. "Jumba!"
13. "Hey, Mr. Watson"
14. "Tokonatsu no Hakuchūmu" (常夏の白昼夢; "Daydream of Everlasting Summer")
15. "Kakuin, Kinkyū Sentō Haibi!" (各員、緊急戦闘配備!; "Everyone, Urgent Deployment!)
16. "Vital Atomz"
17. "Cosmic Youth"
18. Kaijin da Mensō (怪人ダ面相; "Mysterious Person's Countenance")
19. "fight in the cell"
20. "Himitsu Kessha Powazon" (秘密結社 ポワゾン; "Secret Society Powason")
21. "Run! Run! Run!"
22. "Make Rare Nai Tatakai" (負けられない闘い; "Unbeatable Fight")
23. "twilight harbor"
24. "Dragon Ball Party"

=== Hikari no Sasu Mirai e! ===
"Hikari no Sasu Mirai e!"

Single by Hironobu Kageyama

from the album Dragon Ball Z: Infinite World Original Soundtrack
- Released: December 25, 2008
- Genre: Anison
- Length: 17:00
- Label: King Records
- Songwriters: Yuriko Mori; Kenz

Hironobu Kageyama singles chronology
"Fūun Musō Ten"	"Hikari no Sasu Mirai e!"	"Progression"

"Hikari no Sasu Mirai e!" (光のさす未来へ!, To the Future Pointed By the Light!) is the opening theme to the video game and is the sixty-ninth single by Japanese singer Hironobu Kageyama. It was released by King Records on Christmas Day in 2008 in Japan only and would peak at 200 on Oricon. The song was written by Yuriko Mori and the composition and arrangement was by Kenji Yamamoto (Kenz).

This release also include the closing theme "Dragon Ball Party" and the English version of the opening theme "We Gonna Take You There". Ironically, the version of the song that was used was the Japanese version as opposed to the English version, which contrasted to the previous two Dragon Ball Z console games Budokai Tenkaichi 3 and Burst Limit which used English versions of their opening theme songs.

Track listing:

1. 光のさす未来へ!
  Hikari no Sasu Mirai e!/To the Future Pointed By the Light!
2. Dragon Ball Party
3. We Gonna Take You There
4. 光のさす未来へ! (instrumental)
  Hikari no Sasu Mirai e! (instrumental)/To the Future Pointed By the Light! (Instrumental)

== Reception ==
Reception

Aggregate scores
Aggregator	Score
GameRankings	50.80%
Metacritic	48/100

Review scores
Publication	Score
GamePro	2/5
GameRevolution	D
GameSpot	5.5/10
GamesRadar+	1.5/5
GameZone	6.1/10
IGN	3.5/10

The game went on to only sell 200,000 copies in Japan and 80,000 copies in the United States as of August 2010. However, Infinite World went on to become Japan's second top-selling game in 2008, selling 76,452 units the first week in the country right behind Professor Layton and the Unwound Future.

During its initial release, Infinite World received mixed reviews. Many felt the game was identical to Budokai 3, while others thought the game's story mode and mini games were too daunting, and that the game was geared more towards hardcore fans instead of casual gamers. It earned aggregated scores of 48/100 on Metacritic, a score of 50.80% on GameRankings, and IGN gave the game a 3.5; a score lower than that of the critically panned Dragon Ball Z: Ultimate Battle 22.

The soundtrack would receive mixed reviews from gaming critics. Unfortunately these critics misstate Kageyama as composer. Due to the North America packaging only listing Kageyama responsible for the music, "Music by Hironobu Kageyama". Sites like Gamer 2.0 and IGN would give the tracks low scores. with IGN's Greg Miller calling the music repetitive. While other sites such as the Gamer Temple and GamesRadar site the music as the only good part the game has to offer with GamesRadar's Alan Kim stating to "download the tunes and skip everything else". Ben Dutka of PSXExtreme found the music to be disconcerting citing that the atmosphere gave the impression that it was mocking the game.
