= Dragon Ball Z: Broly – Second Coming =

- Theatrical release poster
- Directed by: Shigeyasu Yamauchi
- Screenplay by: Takao Koyama
- Based on: Dragon Ball by Akira Toriyama
- Produced by: Tsutomu Tomari; Tomio Anzai
- Starring: Bin Shimada; Masako Nozawa; Takeshi Kusao; Yūko Minaguchi; Mayumi Tanaka; Chafurin; Hitoshi Takagi; Junko Shimakata
- Narrated by: Jōji Yanami
- Cinematography: Yumiko Kajiwara
- Edited by: Shinichi Fukumitsu
- Music by: Shunsuke Kikuchi
- Animation by: Tadayoshi Yamamuro; Naoki Tate; Satoru Iriyoshi; Mamoru Hosoda; Akira Inagami
- Production company: Toei Animation
- Distributed by: Toei Company
- Release date: March 12, 1994
- Running time: 52 minutes
- Country: Japan
- Language: Japanese
- Box office: ¥2.47 billion ($24.2 million)

Dragon Ball Z: Broly – Second Coming, known in Japan as Dragon Ball Z: Kiken na Futari! Sūpā Senshi wa Nemurenai (Japanese: ドラゴンボールZ 危険なふたり!超戦士はねむれない; lit. 'Dragon Ball Z: Two Dangerous People! Super Warriors Can't Sleep'), (Note: Also known by Toei's own English title Dragon Ball Z: Dangerous Rivals.) is a 1994 Japanese anime science fiction martial arts film and the tenth Dragon Ball Z feature film. It was released in Japan on March 12 at the Toei Anime Fair alongside Dr. Slump and Arale-chan: Hoyoyo!! Follow the Rescued Shark... and the first Slam Dunk film. It was preceded by Dragon Ball Z: Bojack Unbound and followed by Dragon Ball Z: Bio-Broly.

== Plot ==
Following his defeat by Goku, Broly emerges from a space pod that crashed on Earth after he escaped the comet that destroyed New Vegeta. He slips into unconsciousness as he repeats Goku's original name "Kakarot" returning to his Base form and is frozen within the crater.

Seven years later, Goten, Trunks, and Videl search for the magical Dragon Balls and encounter a village being terrorized by a supposed monster and a dubious shaman who demands human sacrifice to appease it. They devise a plan to rescue the village by baiting the monster but when Goten inadvertently causes an obstruction, Videl slaps him and he begins to cry. The monster, revealed to be a dinosaur, is drawn out and killed by Goten and Trunks. With the village now safe and the shaman exiled, the group departs to continue their Dragon Ball hunt. Unbeknownst to them, Goten's cries awaken Broly. As night falls the group rests after collecting six of the seven Dragon Balls when a loud eruption occurs and Videl takes off to investigate. She soon encounters Broly in his Super Saiyan form and fights him but he effortlessly dispatches her and she is left unconscious when Goten and Trunks arrive. They battle Broly but they are no match for the brute and they flee in fear. Gohan saves them as they attempt to gather the Dragon Balls to wish Broly away. Gohan is no match for Broly who directs a lethal sphere of energy towards Videl, Trunks and Goten. In distress, Gohan races towards them and attempts to deflect it and manages to shield them from the blast but the ensuing explosion renders them all unconscious.

Gohan assumes his Super Saiyan 2 form in an effort to defeat Broly who transforms into his Legendary Super Saiyan form. Gohan successfully lures Broly into a pit of lava which consumes him and Gohan passes out from exhaustion before being rescued by Krillin. Moments later, Broly re-emerges and attacks Gohan after incapacitating Krillin. Gohan is powerless as he is crushed by Broly's bear hug until Videl arrives and unsuccessfully attempts to intervene. Heartened by Videl's effort, Gohan frees himself from Broly's grip and fires a Super Kamehameha wave at Broly. The Legendary Super Saiyan hurls a gigantic sphere of energy at Gohan which collides with the Kamehameha. Goten joins his brother in the energy struggle but Broly's sphere absorbs their waves and pushes further towards them. Goten wishes their father was there to help them and miraculously the Dragon Balls grant his desperate wish as the sky darkens and Goku appears much to their surprise and Broly's confusion. Goku joins his sons and fires a Super Kamehameha wave, however their Kamehameha Father-Sons combined effort remains futile as Broly continues to resist until he is distracted by Trunks who fires a blast at him. The family of Super Saiyans unleash a final push propelling the Father-Sons Super Kamehameha wave which directly pushes Broly into space and upon colliding with the sun he dies made into pieces forever with no possibility of survival. Gohan and Goten question if their father was ever there at all as Gohan thanks his father and are soon joined by Trunks, Krillin and Videl as they celebrate their victory.

== Cast ==
Character name	Voice actor	
Character name	Japanese	English
Character name	Japanese	Funimation (2005)
Gohan	Masako Nozawa	Kyle Hebert
Goten	Masako Nozawa	Kara Edwards
Goku/Kakarot	Masako Nozawa	Sean Schemmel; Stephanie Nadolny (baby)
Trunks	Takeshi Kusao	Laura Bailey
Videl	Yūko Minaguchi	Kara Edwards
Kuririn	Mayumi Tanaka	Krillin
Kuririn	Mayumi Tanaka	Sonny Strait
Broly	Bin Shimada	Vic Mignogna
Coco (ココ, Koko)	Junko Shimakata	Monica Rial
Shaman (祈祷師, Kitōshi)	Chafurin	Maloja
Shaman (祈祷師, Kitōshi)	Chafurin	Robert McCollum
Natadae Village Elder (ナタデ村の長老, Natade-Mura no Chōrō)	Hitoshi Takagi	Zalador
Natadae Village Elder (ナタデ村の長老, Natade-Mura no Chōrō)	Hitoshi Takagi	Grant James
Villagers	Hisao Egawa; Asuka Kimura; Yoshiyuki Kōno	Adrian Cook; Sean Michael Teague; Michael Terry; Jeremy Inman; Travis Willingham
Narrator	Jōji Yanami	Kyle Hebert

== Music ==
The song "We Gotta Power" was used as the film's opening theme.

=== Kiseki no Big Fight ===
"Kiseki no Big Fight"

Single by Hironobu Kageyama
- Released: May 1, 1994
- Genre: Electronic rock
- Length: 7:36
- Label: Forte Music Entertainment JP
- Songwriter: Yukinojo Mori

Kiseki no Big Fight (奇蹟のビッグ・ファイト, Kiseki no Biggu Faito) is the closing theme song of the film. It is a single by Japanese singer Hironobu Kageyama. It was released on 8 cm cd on March 21, 1994, in Japan only. It is coupled with an image song "Dragon Ball no Densetsu" performed by Shin Oya. The single charted at 89 on Oricon.

Track list:

1. 奇蹟のビッグ・ファイト
  Kiseki no Biggu Faito/The Miraculous Big Fight
2. ドラゴンボールの伝説
  Doragon Bōru no Densetsu/Legend of the Dragon Balls

=== English dub soundtrack ===
The following songs were present in the Funimation dub of Broly – Second Coming. The remaining music featured in the background was composed by Nathan Johnson, but I.O.N made exclusive songs for the film:

- I.O.N. - Set Me Free
- I.O.N. - Ignored
- I.O.N. - Why
- I.O.N. - Deeper
- I.O.N. - Unaccepted

The score for the English dub's composed by Nathan M. Johnson. The Triple Feature release contains an alternate audio track containing the English dub with original Japanese background music by Shunsuke Kikuchi, an opening theme of "We Gotta Power", and an ending theme of "Kiseki no Big Fight".

== Box office ==
At the Japanese box office, the film sold 3.7 million tickets and grossed ¥2.47 billion ($24.2 million).

== Releases ==
It was released on DVD and VHS in North America on April 5, 2005. Plus, it was released it in a bundle along with Broly – The Legendary Super Saiyan (1993) for Blu-ray on November 13, 2007, both feature full 1080p format in HD remastered 16:9 aspect ratio and an enhanced 5.1 surround mix. It was later remastered and released in Triple Feature set with 2 Broly films and Bio-Broly (1994) for Blu-ray and DVD on March 31, 2009. The film was re-released to DVD in final remastered thinpak collection on January 3, 2012, containing the last 4 Dragon Ball Z films.

=== Other companies ===
A second English version, produced and released exclusively in Malaysia by Speedy Video, features an unknown cast.

A third English dub, which was produced and released by Solar Entertainment in the Philippines in 1998, also features an unknown cast. This version was packaged with the next film as a single film titled Dragon Ball Z: The Movie, and was released on VHS by Solar, and on VCD by Warner Home Video Philippines. It was also re-released on VHS in the Philippines by Magnavision, which also distributed The Greatest Rivals, a combined edit of the fifth and sixth Dragon Ball Z films. Despite having been produced in the Philippines, this version may not likely have involved Creative Products Corporation nor any of its affiliated actors who had dubbed The Greatest Rivals and the first 49 episodes of the series for the Philippine English dub, and later the next 50 episodes for the Taglish dub, and the rest of the series in Tagalog.
