= Dragon Ball Z: Ultimate Tenkaichi =

2011 video game

- Developer: Spike
- Publisher: Namco Bandai Games (Note: Released under the Bandai brand name)
- Director: Satoshi Sumiya
- Designer: Tatsuya Marutani
- Artist: Akira Toriyama
- Composer: Takao Nagatani (Note: Uncredited, but the music of this game is featured in other Dragon Ball games under his name)
- Series: Dragon Ball
- Engine: Raging Blast 1 & 2
- Platforms: PlayStation 3 Xbox 360
- Release: NA: October 25, 2011; EU: October 28, 2011; JP: December 8, 2011
- Genre: Fighting
- Modes: Single-player, multiplayer

Dragon Ball Z: Ultimate Tenkaichi (Note: Known in Japan as Dragon Ball: Ultimate Blast (ドラゴンボールアルティメットブラスト, Doragon Bōru Arutimetto Burasuto)) is a game based on the manga and anime franchise Dragon Ball Z. It was developed by Spike and published by Namco Bandai Games under the Bandai label in late October 2011 for the PlayStation 3 and Xbox 360.

The game is a 3D fighter that allows players to take control of various characters from the Dragon Ball Z franchise or created by the player to either fight against the AI, or with another player locally or online.

== Development ==
The game was first announced under the working title Dragon Ball Game Project Age 2011 in the early May issue of Weekly Shonen Jump magazine. The announcement featured several screenshots with Goku and Vegeta, in both normal and Super Saiyan forms, highlighting the game's mechanics. The announcement stated that the game would feature superb visuals and would be released in Japan sometime in autumn of 2011 for both PlayStation 3 and Xbox 360 gaming consoles. A few days later the North American branch of Namco Bandai released a press statement announcing that they would be releasing the game throughout North America. They also confirmed that Spike would return to work on the game. The June issue of V Jump magazine showcased several screenshots of Goku and Vegeta, in his Oozaru form, demonstrating a type of timed button action mechanic. It also confirmed the return of the destructible environments mechanics from previous Budokai Tenkaichi and Raging Blast games.

Hero Mode allows players to create a new character using new and existing attributes for hair, complexion, clothing, voice, and attack moves.

In the following Namco Bandai press release, it was announced that the game's official English title would be Ultimate Tenkaichi and that its release date would be October 25, while its European release date was revealed to be October 28. The title was chosen by fans through a survey conducted by Namco Bandai along with four other possible choices. In response, Namco Bandai marketing president Carlson Choi stated their reasoning for the outreach by describing the fans as "the most passionate gamers and anime experts in the world." Later in July, it was announced that the game would not only include the return of GT characters to the roster, but also include a type of character creation and customization mode. The August 8 issue of Shonen Jump featured screenshots of the story mode, showcasing a type of free-roam mechanic similar to that found in Budokai 3 and the later Budokai Tenkaichi games, where the player could explore the entire planet from the sky and land in certain areas. The following issue of V Jump revealed that the game will be released under the title of Ultimate Blast in Japan, with the release date for December 8.

In early September, more details were divulged on the character creator mode referred to as "Hero Mode". The mode gives players the option of customizing a character of their choosing with a variety of existing and original outfits and hairstyles, in addition to the ability to change and adjust their color schemes. The following issue of Shonen Jump revealed that the game would include a new opening introduction in traditional 2D animation set to the song "Cha-La Head-Cha-La" by Hironobu Kageyama (Dragon Ball Z's 1st Opening Song in Japan).

=== Promotions ===
Preorders for the Japanese release came with a life-sized replica of the Sūshinchū (四星球, Four Star Ball). While in Europe, preorders came with a free capsule pen with their purchase. The European version also had a special collectors edition that came boxed with a Son Gohan figure in Super Saiyan form dressed in his Great Saiyaman costume.

== Characters ==
Name	Playable Transformations	Available at Start
Android #16		Yes
Android #17		Yes
Android #18		Yes
Android #19		Yes
Android #20		Yes
Bardock		No
Broly	Legendary Super Saiyan	No
Burter		Yes
Captain Ginyu	Base; Goku's Body	No
Cell	Imperfect Form; Semi-Perfect Form; Perfect Form; Super Perfect Form	Yes
Cell Jr		Yes
Cui		Yes
Dodoria		Yes
Frieza	First Form; Second Form; Third Form; Final Form; 100% Full Power	No
Gogeta	Super Saiyan	Yes
Gogeta (GT)	Super Saiyan 4	No
Gohan (Kid)		Yes
Gohan (Teen)	Super Saiyan; Super Saiyan 2	Yes
Gohan (Adult)	Potential Unleashed	Yes
Goku	Base; Super Saiyan; Super Saiyan 2; Super Saiyan 3	Yes
Gotenks	Super Saiyan; Super Saiyan 3	Yes
Janemba	Super Janemba	No
Jeice		No
Kid Buu		Yes
Krillin		Yes
Majin Buu		Yes
Nappa		Yes
Omega Shenron		No
Piccolo		Yes
Raditz		No
Recoome		Yes
Saibaman		Yes
Super Buu	Base; Gohan Absorbed	Yes
Tien		Yes
Trunks (Future)	Base; Super Saiyan	No
Vegeta	Base; Super Saiyan; Super Saiyan Second Grade	Yes
Vegeta (Scouter)		No
Vegeta (Majin)	Super Saiyan 2	No
Vegito	Super Saiyan	No
Yamcha		Yes
Zarbon	Base; Transformed	Yes
Custom Hero	Base; Super Saiyan	Yes

== Reception ==
Reception

Aggregate score
Aggregator	Score
Metacritic	PS3: 58/100; X360: 55/100

Review scores
Publication	Score
Destructoid	7.5/10
GamePro	3/5
GameRevolution	3/10
GameSpot	4/10
IGN	7.5/10

Dragon Ball Z: Ultimate Tenkaichi received mixed reviews. IGN gave the game a 7.5 out of 10, praising the graphics and combat, but criticized the storytelling and the repetitive nature of the battles. GameSpot gave the game a 4.0 out of 10, praising the graphics, but detested the game's combat system as there is no sense of originality; the boss fights due to the frustrating Quick Time Event stages; and the character creation system due to the limited amount of items given. Destructoid gave the game a 7.5 saying "While combat can be a bit on the repetitive side, there's still that hint of satisfaction when you decimate your foe with a canyon-creating power move. There's a lot here for fans to enjoy, and while the story may be streamlined for new fans of the franchise, I can't really recommend it to anyone but the hardcore."
