= List of Dragon Ball episodes =

Episodes of Japanese anime series

First volume of the Dragon Ball DVD series, released by Pony Canyon on April 4, 2007.

Dragon Ball is the first of two anime adaptations of the Dragon Ball manga series by Akira Toriyama. Produced by Toei Animation, the anime series premiered in Japan on Fuji Television on February 26, 1986, and ran until April 19, 1989. Spanning 153 episodes it covers the first 194 chapters of the 519 chapter-long manga series. It is followed by Dragon Ball Z, which covers the remainder of the manga.

== Sagas overview ==
| Season (Note: These seasons correspond to the sets released by Funimation in 2003. However, they only correspond to story arcs, which are themselves split at debatable points, and not to the pattern in which the show aired in either Japan or the United States. In Japan, Dragon Ball like both of the other Dragon Ball series was aired year-round continuously with regular off-days for sporting events and television specials taking place about once every six weeks on average.) | Episodes | Originally released | |
| Season | Episodes | First released | Last released |
|---|---|---|---|
| 1 | 13 | February 26, 1986 | May 21, 1986 |
| 2 | 15 | May 28, 1986 | September 3, 1986 |
| 3 | 17 | September 10, 1986 | January 7, 1987 |
| 4 | 12 | January 14, 1987 | April 8, 1987 |
| 5 | 11 | April 15, 1987 | July 1, 1987 |
| 6 | 15 | July 8, 1987 | October 14, 1987 |
| 7 | 18 | October 21, 1987 | February 17, 1988 |
| 8 | 21 | February 24, 1988 | August 10, 1988 |
| 9 | 31 | August 17, 1988 | April 19, 1989 |

== Episodes ==
=== Season 1: Emperor Pilaf Saga (1986) ===
| No. | Japanese title Dub title(s) | Directed by (Note: Oversees the entire process of the episode. Also credited to storyboard, a visual version of the script, for Toei Animation series; unless the 絵コンテ (storyboard) is credited specifically the 演出 (episode director) storyboarded it.) | Written by (Note: Script writer.) | Animation directed by (Note: Corrects the layouts and key animation drawings of the key animators.) | Original release date | English air dates |
|---|---|---|---|---|---|---|
| 1 | "Bulma and Son Goku"; Transliteration: "Buruma to Son Gokū" (Japanese: ブルマと孫悟空) | Minoru Okazaki | Yasushi Hirano | Minoru Maeda | February 26, 1986 | January 1, 1990 (Harmony Gold) September 9, 1995 (BLT) August 20, 2001 (Funimation) September 1, 2003 (Blue Water) |
| 1 | "The Secret of the Dragon Balls" | Minoru Okazaki | Yasushi Hirano | Minoru Maeda | February 26, 1986 | January 1, 1990 (Harmony Gold) September 9, 1995 (BLT) August 20, 2001 (Funimation) September 1, 2003 (Blue Water) |
Son Goku, a young boy, but strong orphan living alone in the mountains, and Bulma, a teenage girl searching for seven mystical balls, come together when Bulma hits Goku head-on while driving a motorized vehicle. The balls that Bulma is searching for, known as Dragon Balls, summon the wish granting "dragon god", Shenron. Before Goku's grandfather Son Gohan died, he gave him a Dragon Ball with four stars on it: the Four-Star Ball. Bulma, already possessing two of the balls, decides to let Goku "join her on a fun adventure" so she can borrow his strength and Dragon Ball. They take off on a motorcycle, but Bulma is abducted by a giant flying dinosaur during a little pit stop. Goku takes out the monster with his Power Pole and rescues her.
| 2 | "What the...?! No Balls!"; Transliteration: "Arararaa! Tama ga Nai!" (Japanese: あらららー!タマがない!) | Daisuke Nishio | Toshiki Inoue | Tomekichi Takeuchi | March 5, 1986 | January 2, 1990 (Harmony Gold) September 16, 1995 (BLT) August 21, 2001 (Funimation) September 2, 2003 (Blue Water) |
| 2 | "The Emperor's Quest" | Daisuke Nishio | Toshiki Inoue | Tomekichi Takeuchi | March 5, 1986 | January 2, 1990 (Harmony Gold) September 16, 1995 (BLT) August 21, 2001 (Funimation) September 2, 2003 (Blue Water) |
Goku and Bulma set up a shelter to sleep in. At night, Goku goes out looking for some food. He sees a plane fly overhead, and, thinking that it is a bird, goes running after it. The plane belongs to Mai and Shu, who are servants of Emperor Pilaf. The Emperor is also looking for the Dragon Balls, and he plans to use them to achieve his dream to rule the world. Goku saves them from wolves, and heads back. In the morning, he finds a Giant turtle who is looking for the sea. Goku volunteers to take him there, so he picks up the turtle on his back and begins running, with Bulma following on her motorcycle.
| 3 | "The Turtle Hermit's Kinto-Un"; Transliteration: "Kame-Sennin no Kinto-Un" (Japanese: 亀仙人のキント雲) | Kazuhisa Takenouchi | Keiji Terui | Masayuki Uchiyama | March 12, 1986 | January 3, 1990 (Harmony Gold) September 23, 1995 (BLT) August 22, 2001 (Funimation) September 3, 2003 (Blue Water) |
| 3 | "The Nimbus Cloud of Roshi" (Harmony Gold/BLT/Funimation)"Roshi's Nimbus Cloud" (Blue Water) | Kazuhisa Takenouchi | Keiji Terui | Masayuki Uchiyama | March 12, 1986 | January 3, 1990 (Harmony Gold) September 23, 1995 (BLT) August 22, 2001 (Funimation) September 3, 2003 (Blue Water) |
On their way to the sea, Goku and Bulma run into a giant beast that wants to eat the turtle. Goku makes short work of him, and they continue on their way. When they arrive at the shore, the turtle tells them to wait for him. When he comes back, a man is riding on his back. That man is the turtle hermit: Master Roshi, and as a reward for helping his sea turtle, he gives Goku a flying cloud called the Flying Nimbus. Master Roshi himself cannot ride the cloud, because only good and pure people can. Bulma can't ride it either, but Goku can, because he has a good heart. Roshi also gives Bulma the Three-Star Ball in exchange for seeing her underwear, not knowing what the Dragon Ball is. When Master Roshi returns to his island, he finds Pilaf and his two henchmen searching his house for the Dragon Ball. After he tells them that he gave it away, the three leave his island. Their boat sinks due to Master Roshi putting a hole in the side while pretending to give them a boost.
| 4 | "Oolong, the Kidnapping Monster"; Transliteration: "Hitosarai Yōkai Ūron" (Japanese: 人さらい妖怪ウーロン) | Minoru Okazaki | Michiru Shimada | Minoru Maeda | March 19, 1986 | January 4, 1990 (Harmony Gold) September 30, 1995 (BLT) August 23, 2001 (Funimation) September 4, 2003 (Blue Water) |
| 4 | "Mao Mao the Terrible" (Harmony Gold)"Oolong the Terrible" (BLT/Funimation) "Oolong the Terrible!" (Blue Water) | Minoru Okazaki | Michiru Shimada | Minoru Maeda | March 19, 1986 | January 4, 1990 (Harmony Gold) September 30, 1995 (BLT) August 23, 2001 (Funimation) September 4, 2003 (Blue Water) |
The Dragon Radar leads Goku and Bulma into a remote village. They find that the village is being terrorized by a shape-shifter named Oolong. An old woman in this village has the Six-Star Ball, and she agrees to give it to them if they drive Oolong away from their village. Oolong wants to marry a girl in the village, so Goku dresses up like her to trick Oolong. When Oolong discovers this, he gets very angry. To protect his identity, he reverts into his original state after he transformed and runs away from the village. Goku follows, and eventually catches and defeats him. With the village saved, the old woman gives them the Six-Star Ball.
| 5 | "Yamcha, The Strong Yet Cruel Desert Bandit"; Transliteration: "Tsuyokute Warui Sabaku no Yamucha" (Japanese: つよくて悪い砂漠のヤムチャ) | Daisuke Nishio | Takao Koyama | Yukio Ebisawa | March 26, 1986 | January 5, 1990 (Harmony Gold) October 7, 1995 (BLT) August 24, 2001 (Funimation) September 5, 2003 (Blue Water) |
| 5 | "Zedaki the Warrior" (Harmony Gold)"Yamcha the Desert Bandit" (BLT/Funimation) "Yamcha The Desert Bandit!" (Blue Water) | Daisuke Nishio | Takao Koyama | Yukio Ebisawa | March 26, 1986 | January 5, 1990 (Harmony Gold) October 7, 1995 (BLT) August 24, 2001 (Funimation) September 5, 2003 (Blue Water) |
Bulma forces Oolong to join their group, thinking that his shape shifting ability will come in handy. Their boat runs out of gas, so they have to walk through the desert. Yamcha, a dangerous bandit, is said to live in this desert. While they walk through the desert, Yamcha and his shape shifting cat Puar ambush them. Goku and Yamcha begin to fight. Yamcha thinks he has won after he uses his Wolf Fang Fist, but Goku is able to get up. Just as Yamcha is about to attack again, he sees Bulma. Yamcha gets nervous around girls, so he panics and runs away.
| 6 | "Midnight Callers"; Transliteration: "Mayonaka no Hōmonsha-tachi" (Japanese: 真夜中の訪問者たち) | Kazuhisa Takenouchi | Yasushi Hirano | Masayuki Uchiyama | April 2, 1986 | October 14, 1995 (BLT) August 27, 2001 (Funimation) September 8, 2003 (Blue Water) |
| 6 | "Keep an Eye on the Dragon Balls" (BLT/Funimation)"Keeping an Eye on the Dragon Balls" (Blue Water) | Kazuhisa Takenouchi | Yasushi Hirano | Masayuki Uchiyama | April 2, 1986 | October 14, 1995 (BLT) August 27, 2001 (Funimation) September 8, 2003 (Blue Water) |
Oolong remembers that he has a camper Dyno-Cap, so the three spend the night in it. Goku tells Oolong about the Dragon Balls. Oolong drugs the drinks of Goku and Bulma, causing them to fall asleep. Yamcha and Puar have been listening from outside the window, and now plan to take the balls. Puar changes into Goku to lure Oolong (who transformed into Bulma, thinking she was Goku) out of the camper and Yamcha sneaks inside. But what he thinks are the Dragon Ball but after uncovering the "Dragon Balls" and finding out they were Bulma's breasts; Yamcha completely loses it and retreats with Puar who flew away from Oolong, after the shape-shifting pig and cat discovered each other's true identities from being Goku and Bulma. Yamcha then finally decides to follow Goku and Bulma and allow them to gather all of the dragon balls first, before he can try to seize them.
| 7 | "Gyumao of Mt. Frypan"; Transliteration: "Furaipan Yama no Gyūmaō" (Japanese: フライパン山の牛魔王) | Yoshihiro Ueda; Storyboarded by : Katsumi Endō | Toshiki Inoue | Mitsuo Shindō | April 9, 1986 | October 21, 1995 (BLT) August 28, 2001 (Funimation) September 9, 2003 (Blue Water) |
| 7 | "The Ox-King on Fire Mountain" (BLT)"The Ox King on Fire Mountain" (Funimation) "The Ox-King on Fire Mountain!" (Blue Water) | Yoshihiro Ueda; Storyboarded by : Katsumi Endō | Toshiki Inoue | Mitsuo Shindō | April 9, 1986 | October 21, 1995 (BLT) August 28, 2001 (Funimation) September 9, 2003 (Blue Water) |
Goku, Bulma, and Oolong arrive at Fire Mountain, with Yamcha and Puar following closely behind. There, they meet the Ox King, who lives in the castle on Fire Mountain. The Ox King notices Goku's flying Nimbus Cloud, and realizes that he must have received it from Master Roshi. He sent his daughter Chi-Chi to go to Master Roshi's island to borrow the Bansho Fan to put out the flames on Fire Mountain, but she never came back. The Ox King tells Goku that if he finds Chi-Chi and returns with the Bansho Fan, he can have the Dragon Ball that's inside his castle. Goku takes off and finds Chi-Chi right away. But after Chi-Chi accidentally grabs Goku's tail to help herself climb onto the Nimbus Cloud, which causes him to get dizzy, Yamcha and Puar discover that Goku's tail is his only weak point. And as Goku and Chi-Chi leaves for Master Roshi's island, in order to steal the Dragon Balls, they plan to grab Goku's tail to weaken him. After asking for directions from a dolphin, Goku and Chi-Chi arrive at Master Roshi's island.
| 8 | "The Turtle Hermit's Kamehameha"; Transliteration: "Kame-Sennin no Kamehameha" (Japanese: 亀仙人のカメハメ波) | Yoshihiro Ueda; Storyboarded by : Toshihiko Arisako | Keiji Terui | Minoru Maeda | April 16, 1986 | October 28, 1995 (BLT) August 29, 2001 (Funimation) September 10, 2003 (Blue Water) |
| 8 | "The Kamehameah Wave" [sic] (BLT)"The Kamehameha Wave" (Funimation/Blue Water) | Yoshihiro Ueda; Storyboarded by : Toshihiko Arisako | Keiji Terui | Minoru Maeda | April 16, 1986 | October 28, 1995 (BLT) August 29, 2001 (Funimation) September 10, 2003 (Blue Water) |
Master Roshi agrees to let Goku borrow the Bansho fan, but when he goes to retrieve it, he remembers that he spilled juice on it and threw it out. He decides to put out the fire himself. When they arrive back at Fire Mountain, Master Roshi uses his famous Kamehame-Ha to blow out the flames. The wave puts out the fire, but it also destroys the entire mountain. With the Dragon Radar, Bulma is able to search through the rubble and find the Seven-Star Ball. Goku asks Master Roshi if he can learn the Kamehame-Ha, but is disappointed to find out that it took the turtle hermit 50 years to learn it. He tries it anyway, and is miraculously able to do it on the first try.
| 9 | "The Rabbit Boss' Special Technique"; Transliteration: "Usagi Oyabun no Tokui Waza" (Japanese: うさぎオヤブンの得意技) | Minoru Okazaki | Michiru Shimada | Minoru Maeda | April 23, 1986 | November 4, 1995 (BLT) August 30, 2001 (Funimation) September 11, 2003 (Blue Water) |
| 9 | "Boss Rabbit's Magic Touch" (BLT/Funimation)"Grand Master Rabbit's Magic Touch!" (Blue Water) | Minoru Okazaki | Michiru Shimada | Minoru Maeda | April 23, 1986 | November 4, 1995 (BLT) August 30, 2001 (Funimation) September 11, 2003 (Blue Water) |
Goku, Bulma, and Oolong drive into a city to get gas, unaware that they are still being followed by Yamcha and Puar, who then hide behind the wall to spy on them. Everyone in this town seems to be afraid of Bulma but after she buys some new clothes and gets rid of her bunny costume, no one even notices her. Just as they're about to leave, two men in bunny ears begin to hassle them. Goku beats both of them up, so they call in "the boss". The boss, whose name is Monster Carrot, arrives. He is a giant rabbit whose special power is his touch; if anyone touches him, he/she turns into a carrot. Not knowing this, Bulma slaps him, turning her into a carrot which Monster Carrot grabs. His two men then start to beat up Goku. Watching from behind a wall, Puar turns into a bird and snatches the carrot out of his hand, and Yamcha beats up the two men to save Goku. Goku then hits him with his Power Pole, forcing Monster Carrot to surrender. He changes Bulma back. Goku then ties up Monster Carrot and his henchmen and takes them to the moon by extending his Power Pole, proceeding to force them to make treats for children.
| 10 | "The Dragon Balls are Stolen!!!"; Transliteration: "Doragon Bōru Ubawareru!!" (Japanese: D.B.うばわれる!!) | Kazuhisa Takenouchi | Takao Koyama | Tomekichi Takeuchi | April 30, 1986 | November 11, 1995 (BLT) August 31, 2001 (Funimation) September 12, 2003 (Blue Water) |
| 10 | "The Dragon Balls are Stolen" (BLT)"The Dragon Balls are Stolen!" (Funimation/Blue Water) | Kazuhisa Takenouchi | Takao Koyama | Tomekichi Takeuchi | April 30, 1986 | November 11, 1995 (BLT) August 31, 2001 (Funimation) September 12, 2003 (Blue Water) |
While Goku, Bulma and Oolong are driving towards the final Dragon Ball, Shu uses his battle robot to fire a rocket at their car. Then he jumps down and runs off with Bulma's suitcase, which contains their Dragon Balls. Goku tries to follow, but loses him. Luckily, Goku still has the Four-Star Ball, so Pilaf can't make his wish to rule the world. Bulma's Dyno-Caps are in her suitcase as well, so they have no ride. With no other options, Yamcha is forced to give them a lift. They arrive at Pilaf's castle. Inside, they come to a dead end, but before they can turn around, a wall comes down, trapping them inside.
| 11 | "At Last the Dragon Appears!"; Transliteration: "Tsui ni Doragon Arawaru!" (Japanese: ついに龍あらわる!) | Daisuke Nishio | Yasushi Hirano | Masayuki Uchiyama | May 7, 1986 | November 18, 1995 (BLT) September 3, 2001 (Funimation) September 15, 2003 (Blue Water) |
| 11 | "The Penalty is Pinball" (BLT/Funimation)"The Penalty is Pinball!" (Blue Water) | Daisuke Nishio | Yasushi Hirano | Masayuki Uchiyama | May 7, 1986 | November 18, 1995 (BLT) September 3, 2001 (Funimation) September 15, 2003 (Blue Water) |
After a failed torture of "treatment" on Bulma, Pilaf, Shu and Mai release sleeping gas inside the chamber, which knocks everyone out, including the Emperor himself who did not put on his gas mask. Shu drags Pilaf away, while Mai goes in and steals the Four-Star Ball from Goku while he's sleeping. When they wake up, they realize the ball has been stolen, and begin to run through the hallways. Pilaf sends giant pinballs rolling after them. Just when one of the balls has them cornered, it suddenly backs off, and a wall comes down again. They are trapped in the same room as before. Goku tries to use a Kamehameha wave to blast away the wall, but only manages to open up a small hole that leads outside, where Pilaf is summoning Shenron to grant his wish for world domination. Puar and Oolong turn into bats and fly through the hole to try to steal one of the balls. But before they can get close enough, Shenron himself appears.
| 12 | "The Wish to Shen Long"; Transliteration: "Shenron e no Negai" (Japanese: 神龍への願い) | Yoshihiro Ueda; Storyboarded by : Toshihiko Arisako | Toshiki Inoue | Yukio Ebisawa | May 14, 1986 | November 25, 1995 (BLT) September 4, 2001 (Funimation) September 16, 2003 (Blue Water) |
| 12 | "A Wish to the Eternal Dragon" | Yoshihiro Ueda; Storyboarded by : Toshihiko Arisako | Toshiki Inoue | Yukio Ebisawa | May 14, 1986 | November 25, 1995 (BLT) September 4, 2001 (Funimation) September 16, 2003 (Blue Water) |
Desperate to stop Emperor Pilaf, and just as Goku manages to destroy the wall with another Kamehameha, Oolong interrupts his wish for world conquest with his own: a pair of soft, comfortable underpants. This wish is granted, Shenron disappears, and the seven balls scatter all over the earth. Furious at losing his chance to rule the world, Pilaf sends Mai and Shu after Oolong and Puar, and noticing Goku, Yamcha and Bulma escape, he orders them executed. Many guard dogs suddenly appear: some chase Oolong and Puar and others corner Goku, Yamcha and Bulma. Goku and Yamcha beat these dogs to protect Bulma, and on their way out they find Oolong and Puar. Before they can leave, Mai and Shu corner them with another pack of dogs and themselves. They are transported to a room with a glass ceiling that gathers energy from the sun and heats up. By morning, just as Pilaf planned for revenge on his meddlers, they will be burnt alive. Goku and Yamcha try to break down the walls, but fail. Later that night, Puar is staring at the full moon while Oolong and Bulma argue over their last hope for escape. Goku tells the group about a huge monster that comes out when the moon is full. He said that the monster trampled his grandfather Gohan to death, and before that tragedy, Gohan told his grandson never to look at the moon. Alarmed with this detail, Bulma, Yamcha, Puar and Oolong quickly deduce that Goku was the monster that killed Gohan (accidentally since Goku has no recollection of transforming) and fear they will meet the same fate. Despite Bulma's warning, Goku accidentally looks up at the full moon. However, at first, nothing seems to happen to Goku as he shrugs over a big deal, much to the group's confusion. But even though he turns away from the moon and his friends sigh in relief, something snaps in Goku: his eyes turn red, his heart beats loudly with increasing speed, and he begins growing with his clothes tearing apart, his body growing fur, his teeth becoming sharp, his ears pointing up, and his face growing a muzzle. To the gang's horror, Goku transforms into a wild monkey/ape monster; the Great Ape.
| 13 | "Goku's Great Transformation"; Transliteration: "Gokū no Dai-Henshin" (Japanese: 悟空の大変身) | Yutaka Satō; Storyboarded by : Akinori Nagaoka | Keiji Terui | Mitsuo Shindō | May 21, 1986 | December 2, 1995 (BLT) September 5, 2001 (Funimation) September 17, 2003 (Blue Water) |
| 13 | "The Legend of Goku" (BLT/Funimation)"The Legend of Goku!" (Blue Water) | Yutaka Satō; Storyboarded by : Akinori Nagaoka | Keiji Terui | Mitsuo Shindō | May 21, 1986 | December 2, 1995 (BLT) September 5, 2001 (Funimation) September 17, 2003 (Blue Water) |
Goku, now a wild Great Ape, begins demolishing Pilaf's castle. Bulma, Yamcha, Oolong, and Puar are able to escape during the chaos. Pilaf, Mai, and Shu board an airplane and start attacking Goku. They are able to bring him down temporarily, but Goku recovers and destroys their plane. He then picks up Bulma and semmingly prepares to eat her. Remembering that Goku's tail is his weak point, Yamcha grabs it, and Puar changes into a giant pair of scissors and cuts it off. Goku regresses back to his normal self; naked, and sleeps until morning. Hoping to spare Goku of heartache, the group decides not to tell him that he was the monster that accidentally killed Gohan. When Goku wakes up, he is shocked to find that his tail is missing and that he is naked, and remembers nothing about his transformation and rampage. He borrows Oolong's pants and finds his Power Pole in the rubble, but finds it hard to balance without his tail. Yamcha and Bulma decide to go back to West City together, with Puar and Oolong tagging along. Goku decides to go find the turtle hermit Roshi to get the training he was promised. Bulma gives Goku the Dragon Radar so he can find the Four-Star Ball when the Dragon Balls reappear.

=== Season 2: Tournament Saga (1986) ===
| No. | Japanese title Dub title(s) | Directed by | Written by | Animation directed by | Original release date | English air dates |
|---|---|---|---|---|---|---|
| 14 | "Goku's Rival? Appears!!"; Transliteration: "Gokū no Raibaru? Sanjō!!" (Japanese: 悟空のライバル? 参上!!) | Kazuhisa Takenouchi | Keiji Terui | Katsumi Aoshima | May 28, 1986 | September 6, 2001 (Funimation) September 18, 2003 (Blue Water) |
| 14 | "Goku's Rival" (Funimation)"Goku's Rival!" (Blue Water) | Kazuhisa Takenouchi | Keiji Terui | Katsumi Aoshima | May 28, 1986 | September 6, 2001 (Funimation) September 18, 2003 (Blue Water) |
Goku stops by his house to gather his things, then heads towards Master Roshi's island. When he arrives, Master Roshi tells him that he will only train him if he brings him a girlfriend. Goku brings back a big ugly-looking girl but Master Roshi wanted a beautiful girl. So Goku brings a beautiful mermaid, but that doesn't go well either. Suddenly, a small boy named Krillin paddles ashore on a boat and requests training from Master Roshi. With the help of a bribe, Master Roshi agrees to train him. He sends Goku and Krillin into the city to find him another girl. Meanwhile, Yamcha's ship crashed, so he, Bulma, Puar, and Oolong are forced to walk through the jungle and desert.
| 15 | "The Peculiar Girl, Lunch"; Transliteration: "Fushigi na On'na no Ko Ranchi" (Japanese: 不思議な女の子ランチ) | Minoru Okazaki | Toshiki Inoue | Minoru Maeda | June 4, 1986 | September 7, 2001 (Funimation) September 19, 2003 (Blue Water) |
| 15 | "Look Out for Launch" (Funimation)"Look Out for Launch!" (Blue Water) | Minoru Okazaki | Toshiki Inoue | Minoru Maeda | June 4, 1986 | September 7, 2001 (Funimation) September 19, 2003 (Blue Water) |
Because Krillin can't sit on the Nimbus Cloud, he is forced to cling to Goku's back during their search for a girl. They find a girl being attacked by two men. Goku beats up these two guys, and they bring the girl back to Master Roshi's island. Unknown to either of them, the girl, Launch, was being arrested when they found her. When she sneezes, she turns into a grumpy, aggressive, blonde criminal. Back on the island, Roshi likes Launch so much that he agrees to take her on as a student, along with Goku and Krillin. Launch sneezes, and then takes out a machine gun and shoots at the three boys. After another sneeze, everything is back to normal.
| 16 | "Training – The Rock Hunt"; Transliteration: "Shugyō · Ishi Sagashi" (Japanese: 修業 ・ 石さがし) | Daisuke Nishio | Yasushi Hirano | Masayuki Uchiyama | June 11, 1986 | September 10, 2001 (Funimation) September 29, 2003 (Blue Water) |
| 16 | "Find That Stone!" (Funimation)"The First Test" (Blue Water) | Daisuke Nishio | Yasushi Hirano | Masayuki Uchiyama | June 11, 1986 | September 10, 2001 (Funimation) September 29, 2003 (Blue Water) |
Master Roshi packs up his house in a dyno capsule, and the four of them head to a bigger island. Master Roshi tests the boys' speed by timing them in a 100-meter dash. Krillin goes first, and runs the distance in 10.4 seconds. Goku's time is 11 seconds, but after he takes off his old, beat-up shoes, he runs it in 8 seconds. Master Roshi dazzles them by running it in 5.6 seconds. Then he gives them their final test for the day. He makes a mark on a stone, then throws it into the woods, telling them to find it; the loser must go without dinner for the night. Krillin tries to fool Master Roshi with a stone of his own, but Roshi sees through the lie. Goku finds the stone, but Krillin steals it and runs away. Goku catches up, and the two of them fight. Goku wins, so Krillin throws a decoy stone back into the woods, and Goku runs after it, thinking it's the real one. Krillin takes the real stone back to Master Roshi. However, Krillin ultimately loses, as Launch made pufferfish for dinner and didn't know that it was poisonous.
| 17 | "With Life at Stake! Milk Delivery"; Transliteration: "Inochigake! Gyūnyū Haitatsu" (Japanese: 命がけ! 牛乳はいたつ) | Yutaka Satō | Takao Koyama | Mitsuo Shindō | June 18, 1986 | September 11, 2001 (Funimation) September 30, 2003 (Blue Water) |
| 17 | "Milk Delivery" (Funimation)"Training Begins Turtle Hermit Style" (Blue Water) | Yutaka Satō | Takao Koyama | Mitsuo Shindō | June 18, 1986 | September 11, 2001 (Funimation) September 30, 2003 (Blue Water) |
Master Roshi wakes the boys up early to begin their training. Their job is to deliver milk, but there are several miles between each house. After several exhausting runs, they are made to climb a mountain to deliver milk to the monk at the top. While at the top, Master Roshi tells them that in eight months, they will be competing in the 21st World Martial Arts Tournament. This encouraging thought is enough to drive Goku and Krillin through the end of their milk delivery. Once the delivery ends, Master Roshi tells them that they will be delivering milk every day until the tournament. The boys are shocked to find out that the milk delivery was only their early morning training, and that they have much more to do every day. Meanwhile, Yamcha is also training for the World Martial Arts Tournament.
| 18 | "The Turtle Hermit's Intense Training"; Transliteration: "Kame-senryū Kitsūi Shugyō" (Japanese: 亀仙流きつーい修業) | Yoshihiro Ueda; Storyboarded by : Yukio Ebisawa | Keiji Terui | Yukio Ebisawa | June 25, 1986 | September 12, 2001 (Funimation) October 1, 2003 (Blue Water) |
| 18 | "The Turtle Hermit Way" (Funimation)"Training Triumphs" (Blue Water) | Yoshihiro Ueda; Storyboarded by : Yukio Ebisawa | Keiji Terui | Yukio Ebisawa | June 25, 1986 | September 12, 2001 (Funimation) October 1, 2003 (Blue Water) |
The boys continue their workout by plowing an entire field with their bare hands. After a quick breakfast, they head over to a construction site. Here, they dig holes and haul equipment. Their speed dazzles the foreman. They eat lunch and then take a nap. Goku is getting impatient, and wants to learn fighting moves, but Master Roshi says he will not teach them fighting moves until their bodies are in the proper condition. Their next task is to swim 10 laps on a lake while they're being chased by sharks. Then Master Roshi ties them to a tree and makes them dodge angry bees. At the end of the day's training, Master Roshi tells them they will be doing the same thing every day for the next eight months, but with 50 lb. turtle shells on their backs.
| 19 | "The Tenkaichi Tournament Begins!"; Transliteration: "Tenka'ichi Budōkai Hajimaru!" (Japanese: 天下一武道会はじまる!) | Kazuhisa Takenouchi | Toshiki Inoue | Tomekichi Takeuchi | July 2, 1986 | September 13, 2001 (Funimation) October 2, 2003 (Blue Water) |
| 19 | "The Tournament Begins" (Funimation)"To the Tournament!" (Blue Water) | Kazuhisa Takenouchi | Toshiki Inoue | Tomekichi Takeuchi | July 2, 1986 | September 13, 2001 (Funimation) October 2, 2003 (Blue Water) |
After several months of training, the boys are anxious to learn fighting techniques. Master Roshi tells them that he has no technique to teach them. The whole point of turtle hermit training is to get your body in superhuman condition. He says fighting is just the expression of your power. Then he gives them 100 lb. turtle shells to wear from now on. After a couple of months, the day before the tournament finally arrives. After everyone checks in; Yamcha, Bulma, Oolong, and Puar meet up with Goku. The next morning, Master Roshi gives Goku and Krillin fighting uniforms to wear.
| 20 | "Will it Appear!? The Power From the Training"; Transliteration: "Deru ka!? Shugyō no Iryoku" (Japanese: でるか!? 修業の威力) | Daisuke Nishio | Yasushi Hirano | Masayuki Uchiyama | July 9, 1986 | September 14, 2001 (Funimation) October 3, 2003 (Blue Water) |
| 20 | "Elimination Round" | Daisuke Nishio | Yasushi Hirano | Masayuki Uchiyama | July 9, 1986 | September 14, 2001 (Funimation) October 3, 2003 (Blue Water) |
The preliminary rounds are divided into four sections, with the top two from each section going on to the finals. Goku and Krillin are drawn into the same section, but are on opposite ends, so they won't have to fight each other. Goku's first match is against a giant, but he is able to knock him out of the ring with only a slight tap to the leg. Krillin's first opponent is an enemy from his old martial arts school. He kicks his opponent so hard that he breaks a hole in the wall. Bulma, Oolong, and Puar are able to watch the matches through this hole. At the end of the day, Goku, Krillin, and Yamcha all advance to the quarter-final round of the World Martial Arts Tournament.
| 21 | "Watch Out! Kuririn"; Transliteration: "Ayaushi! Kuririn" (Japanese: 危うし! クリリン) | Katsumi Aoshima; Storyboarded by : Haruki Iwanami | Keiji Terui | Katsumi Aoshima | July 16, 1986 | September 17, 2001 (Funimation) October 6, 2003 (Blue Water) |
| 21 | "Smells Like Trouble" (Funimation)"Krillin's Trial" (Blue Water) | Katsumi Aoshima; Storyboarded by : Haruki Iwanami | Keiji Terui | Katsumi Aoshima | July 16, 1986 | September 17, 2001 (Funimation) October 6, 2003 (Blue Water) |
Goku and Krillin meet up with Bulma, Oolong, and Puar before the finals start. Master Roshi arrives, saying that he missed the preliminaries because of a long line in the bathroom. When the contestants are called to the arena, Goku and Krillin leave, and Master Roshi mysteriously disappears. They draw numbers to set the quarterfinal matches. Krillin is in the first match against Bacterian, a giant whose stench is paralyzing. Yamcha is in the second match against Jackie Chun, and Goku is in the fourth match. The first match starts, and right away Krillin is paralyzed by Bacterian's stench. Just when it looks like he's going to lose, Goku reminds him that he doesn't have a nose, and Krillin is able to get up and give Bacterian a taste of his own medicine. Krillin moves on to the semifinals.
| 22 | "Yamucha vs. Jackie Chun"; Transliteration: "Yamucha tai Jakkī Chun" (Japanese: ヤムチャVSジャッキーチュン) | Minoru Okazaki | Takao Koyama | Minoru Maeda | July 23, 1986 | September 18, 2001 (Funimation) October 7, 2003 (Blue Water) |
| 22 | "Quarterfinals Begin" (Funimation)"Secrets & Successes" (Blue Water) | Minoru Okazaki | Takao Koyama | Minoru Maeda | July 23, 1986 | September 18, 2001 (Funimation) October 7, 2003 (Blue Water) |
The second match begins. Yamcha tries his best moves against Jackie Chun, but he can't even land a punch because the old man is far too quick for him. The fight ends when Jackie Chun pushes Yamcha out of the ring with his energy. The third match between Nam and Ranfan begins. Nam is fighting for prize money to buy water for his village. Nam hits Ranfan and she starts to cry, but the crying is just an act. She takes advantage of Nam's hesitation and quickly attacks. When Nam is able to defend her attacks easily, she takes off her clothes to distract him. Jackie Chun begins hooting wildly, and Yamcha recognizes this laughter as Master Roshi's. He realizes that Jackie Chun is Roshi. Nam closes his eyes and is able to beat Ranfan.
| 23 | "He's Here! The Mighty Foe Giran"; Transliteration: "Detā! Kyōteki Giran" (Japanese: 出たーっ! 強敵ギラン) | Daisuke Nishio | Toshiki Inoue | Masayuki Uchiyama | July 30, 1986 | September 19, 2001 (Funimation) October 8, 2003 (Blue Water) |
| 23 | "Monster Beast Giran" (Funimation)"A Tail to Remember" (Blue Water) | Daisuke Nishio | Toshiki Inoue | Masayuki Uchiyama | July 30, 1986 | September 19, 2001 (Funimation) October 8, 2003 (Blue Water) |
Goku's match is postponed by rain. While they're waiting for the weather to clear up, they relax in the bar. Giran, Goku's opponent, comes in and gets made fun of by the monks from Krillin's old temple and starts attacking them for bothering him. Yamcha warns Goku that Giran has been known to cheat. When the match finally starts, Giran tricks Goku into dropping his guard, then punches him. Goku responds with a furious attack and throws Giran out of the ring. Giran reveals that he can fly, and he lands safely back in bounds. He then spits rock-hard gum onto Goku, wraply trapping him. He throws Goku out of the ring, but Goku calls the flying Nimbus Cloud to save him. Just as Giran is about to punch Goku, his tail grows back and he dodges the punch. Since he is stronger with his tail, he is now able to break the gum. Shocked at this incredible display of strength, Giran forfeits the match.
| 24 | "Kuririn's Desperate Offensive and Defensive Battle"; Transliteration: "Kuririn Hisshi no Dai-Kōbōsen" (Japanese: クリリン必死の大攻防戦) | Kazuhisa Takenouchi | Yasushi Hirano | Mitsuo Shindō | August 6, 1986 | September 20, 2001 (Funimation) October 9, 2003 (Blue Water) |
| 24 | "Krillin's Frantic Attack!" (Funimation)"Slow Motion Capture" (Blue Water) | Kazuhisa Takenouchi | Yasushi Hirano | Mitsuo Shindō | August 6, 1986 | September 20, 2001 (Funimation) October 9, 2003 (Blue Water) |
The first semifinal begins, as Krillin and Jackie Chun fight. Unfortunately, Jackie Chun's punches are too fast for Krillin to see. He attacks Jackie Chun, and after a brief instant, they fly away from each other. The announcer asks them to slowly reenact what happened. Jackie Chun tried to kick Krillin, but he dodged it and then tried to land a punch, but Jackie spit at him. Krillin countered this with his own spit. Then they played janken, which was just a distraction, allowing Jackie to kick Krillin in the face. After the reenactment, Krillin distracts Jackie with a pair of panties, then kicks him far out of the ring. Jackie uses a Kamehameha wave to blast himself back into the ring. Then he uses the after-image technique to distract Krillin, allowing him to land a double karate chop, which knocks Krillin out. After the match, Yamcha, thinking that Jackie Chun is Master Roshi, tries to pull his wig off, but can't. Even though it seems like Jackie Chun is Master Roshi, no one can prove it.
| 25 | "Get Up, Goku! The Fearsome Tenku Pekeji-ken"; Transliteration: "Tate Gokū! Osoru Beki Tenkū Pekeji-ken" (Japanese: たて悟空! 恐るべき天空X字拳) | Yoshihiro Ueda; Storyboarded by : Haruki Iwanami | Keiji Terui | Yukio Ebisawa | August 13, 1986 | September 21, 2001 (Funimation) October 10, 2003 (Blue Water) |
| 25 | "Danger From Above" (Funimation)"The Last Semi-Triumph" (Blue Water) | Yoshihiro Ueda; Storyboarded by : Haruki Iwanami | Keiji Terui | Yukio Ebisawa | August 13, 1986 | September 21, 2001 (Funimation) October 10, 2003 (Blue Water) |
Goku starts his semifinal match against Nam. He uses a tornado attack to push Nam out of the ring, but gets too dizzy before he can finish it. Nam then uses his aerial attack, which is supposed to leave the victim unconscious. Goku is somehow able to stand up afterwards, and jumps up in the air just like Nam. Once Nam lands, Goku kicks him out of the ring. Afterwards, Nam packs up to leave, but Jackie Chun stops him. He gives him a dyno capsule that can be used for storage. Nam asks Jackie how he knew about his water problem, and Jackie says that he read his mind. Nam realizes that Jackie Chun is Master Roshi, but Jackie keeps him quiet. He explains that he is fighting undercover to beat Goku and Krillin. He doesn't want them to think that they're the strongest in the world if they win the tournament and stop trying to improve their skills afterwards. Nam then does Jackie a favor by dressing up like Master Roshi and standing in the crowd. Yamcha sees him, and no longer thinks that Jackie Chun is Master Roshi.
| 26 | "The Final Round!! Kamehame-Ha"; Transliteration: "Kesshōsen da!! Kamehame-Ha" (Japanese: 決勝戦だ!! カメハメ波) | Yoshihiro Ueda | Keiji Terui | Tomekichi Takeuchi | August 20, 1986 | September 24, 2001 (Funimation) October 13, 2003 (Blue Water) |
| 26 | "The Grand Finals" | Yoshihiro Ueda | Keiji Terui | Tomekichi Takeuchi | August 20, 1986 | September 24, 2001 (Funimation) October 13, 2003 (Blue Water) |
The final match begins. Goku jumps up in the air, but Jackie Chun sees it coming and kicks him out of the ring. Everyone thinks that Jackie has won, but Goku flies back into the ring by spinning his tail like a helicopter blade. Jackie challenges Goku to use the Kamehameha wave and (to his great surprise) Goku can do it just as well as he can. Jackie uses a double after-image to fool Goku. Goku counters with a triple after-image. Jackie then begins staggering wildly around the ring. With his unpredictable movements, he begins beating up Goku. Yamcha tells Goku that he is using the drunken boxing technique, so Goku counters with his crazy monkey attack. He runs around like a monkey, and Jackie Chun can't follow him. Once this is over, Jackie Chun says that his next move will win the match.
| 27 | "Goku's Greatest Pinch"; Transliteration: "Gokū Saidai no Pinch" (Japanese: 悟空 ・ 最大のピンチ) | Kazuhisa Takenouchi | Yasushi Hirano | Masayuki Uchiyama | August 27, 1986 | September 25, 2001 (Funimation) October 14, 2003 (Blue Water) |
| 27 | "Number One Under the Moon?" (Funimation)"The Match Continues Goku Goes Simian" (Blue Water) | Kazuhisa Takenouchi | Yasushi Hirano | Masayuki Uchiyama | August 27, 1986 | September 25, 2001 (Funimation) October 14, 2003 (Blue Water) |
The sun begins to go down for dusk as the final match between Goku and Jackie Chun continues. Jackie hypnotizes Goku and puts him to sleep. Goku can't wake up unless Jackie tells him to. Just before the count reaches 10, Bulma yells "Goku! Your dinner is ready!" and Goku wakes up. Then Goku uses janken attack moves, but Jackie blocks them. Goku tries it again and this time tricks him by saying "paper", but throwing rock. Jackie decides to use an attack that he's only ever used once before: the Lightning Flash Surprise attack. He gathers his energy and shoots it at Goku. This energy is transformed into 20,000 volts when it hits Goku. Just as Goku is about to give up, he glimpses the full moon and transforms into a Great Ape again. Knowing that he must stop Goku's rampage at any cost, Jackie Chun fires his Max Power Kamehameha wave. When the dust clears, Goku is nowhere to be seen and Bulma, Yamcha and the others believe Jackie killed Goku.
| 28 | "Clash!! Power vs. Power"; Transliteration: "Gekitotsu!! Pawā tai Pawā" (Japanese: 激突!! パワー対パワー) | Daisuke Nishio | Michiru Shimada | Katsumi Aoshima | September 3, 1986 | September 26, 2001 (Funimation) October 15, 2003 (Blue Water) |
| 28 | "The Final Blow" | Daisuke Nishio | Michiru Shimada | Katsumi Aoshima | September 3, 1986 | September 26, 2001 (Funimation) October 15, 2003 (Blue Water) |
Jackie Chun reveals that the actual target of his Max Power Kamehameha wave was the moon, and not Goku. Goku; now in his normal but naked self, is shown to be asleep naked in the rubble but wakes up confused on why he is naked, and after borrowing Krillin's clothes for his new one, continue fighting. When the match resumes, Jackie Chun attempts to fire another Kamehameha wave at Goku, but he finds that he doesn't have the energy to do so. Goku then kicks him out of the ring, but Jackie cleverly avoids touching the ground by smashing his foot in the side of the platform. With both of them completely exhausted, they agree on a straightforward finish to the match. After a long bout of fighting, Goku and Jackie jump and kick each other in the face, knocking each other down. The count goes past 10, and the judge says the first person to stand up and declare victory wins. Goku struggles to his feet and manages to stand, but he collapses before finishing his victory declaration. Jackie Chun then stands up and proudly announces his victory. Roshi later takes off his disguise and goes out to eat with his friends, where Goku eats so much food that Roshi has to spend most of his prize money.

=== Season 3: Red Ribbon Army Saga (1986–87) ===
| No. | Japanese title Dub title(s) | Directed by | Written by | Animation directed by | Original release date | English air dates |
|---|---|---|---|---|---|---|
| 29 | "Another Adventure – The Wandering Lake"; Transliteration: "Futatabi Bōken Samayō Mizuumi" (Japanese: ふたたび冒険 さまよう湖) | Minoru Okazaki | Takao Koyama | Minoru Maeda | September 10, 1986 | February 11, 2002 (Funimation) October 16, 2003 (Blue Water) |
| 29 | "The Roaming Lake" | Minoru Okazaki | Takao Koyama | Minoru Maeda | September 10, 1986 | February 11, 2002 (Funimation) October 16, 2003 (Blue Water) |
Master Roshi tells Goku and Krillin to take a break from training for now, but Krillin still decides to go live with him. Goku sets off on his search for the four-star Dragon Ball. Meanwhile, Nam has arrived at his village with the water, but it is still not enough. The river has run dry, so Nam heads upstream to find the source of the disturbance. He is attacked by a dinosaur, but luckily Goku is swimming in a nearby lake and comes to rescue him. He and Nam continue upstream and find that a dam has been built. The monsters that live there refuse to tear it down. Their leader, Giran, recognizes Goku from the tournament. He says that he would tear it down, but it's too strong for them to break. Goku fires a Kamehameha wave at it, which is enough to destroy the dam. With the river replenished, everything seems okay, but a sandstorm suddenly kicks up and dries up the river again. Goku notices the lake he was swimming before. This is the Roaming Lake, and it came to help the village.
| 30 | "Pilaf and the Mysterious Army"; Transliteration: "Pirafu to Nazo no Gundan" (Japanese: ピラフと謎の軍団) | Kazuhisa Takenouchi | Keiji Terui | Mitsuo Shindō | September 17, 1986 | February 12, 2002 (Funimation) October 17, 2003 (Blue Water) |
| 30 | "Pilaf and the Mystery Force" (Funimation)"Pilaf and the Mystery Force!" (Blue Water) | Kazuhisa Takenouchi | Keiji Terui | Mitsuo Shindō | September 17, 1986 | February 12, 2002 (Funimation) October 17, 2003 (Blue Water) |
Goku stops at a lake for a swim. When he gets out, he finds that the dragon radar and his clothes have been stolen. He is forced to go naked and searches for his belongings. He picks up on the thief's scent and follows it to its source. The thief tells him that he sold the radar to an antique salesman in a nearby town. Goku locates the shop and finds his dragon radar there. He picks up a signal coming from the shop, so he turns around and sees Emperor Pilaf and Mai holding the four-star ball, having just bought it from this store. They are able to escape on their ship, but Goku follows them on the Nimbus Cloud. Back at the antique store, a mysterious military force has arrived looking for a Dragon Ball. The salesman gives them a four-star ball, but they recognize it as a fake. Pilaf's four-star ball was also a fake, but Goku does not yet know. The signal he picked up on was the six-star ball in a nest above the shop. A bird then flies away with the ball in its talons.
| 31 | "Yikes! A Fake Goku Appears!!"; Transliteration: "Gege! Nise Gokū Shutsugen!!" (Japanese: ゲゲ! ニセ悟空出現!!) | Daisuke Nishio | Yasushi Hirano | Masayuki Uchiyama | September 24, 1986 | February 13, 2002 (Funimation) October 20, 2003 (Blue Water) |
| 31 | "Wedding Plans?" | Daisuke Nishio | Yasushi Hirano | Masayuki Uchiyama | September 24, 1986 | February 13, 2002 (Funimation) October 20, 2003 (Blue Water) |
Emperor Pilaf gives Goku the fake four-star, but Goku drops it. The bird that had the six-star ball got eaten by a larger bird, and that bird got captured by the Ox King. Chi-Chi thinks Goku is coming, and since she wants to marry him, the Ox King roasts the bird for a wedding feast. Emperor Pilaf's radar picks up the signal coming from Ox King's village, so Shu dresses up as fake Goku to get close enough to steal the ball. The real Goku follows his radar's signal and finds Chi-Chi in a field picking flowers for the wedding. Back at the feast, suddenly the mysterious military force, the Red Ribbon Army, attacks the village, having followed the six-star ball's signal as well. Ox King tries to fight back, but gets captured. Pilaf snatches the Dragon Ball from inside the bird and takes off in his ship. Goku and Chi-Chi notice smoke coming from the village, so they go to check it out.
| 32 | "Vanished!? The Flying Fortress in the Sky"; Transliteration: "Kieta!? Sora Tobu Yōsai" (Japanese: 消えた!? 空とぶ要塞) | Yoshihiro Ueda | Keiji Terui | Tomekichi Takeuchi | October 1, 1986 | February 14, 2002 (Funimation) October 21, 2003 (Blue Water) |
| 32 | "The Flying Fortress – Vanished!" (Funimation)"The Flying Fortress Vanished!" (Blue Water) | Yoshihiro Ueda | Keiji Terui | Tomekichi Takeuchi | October 1, 1986 | February 14, 2002 (Funimation) October 21, 2003 (Blue Water) |
Goku and Chi-Chi arrive at the village in time to rescue the Ox King. After a quick meal, Goku follows the signal on the dragon radar again. Emperor Pilaf's flying fortress shoots down the jets of the Red Ribbon Army and escapes. Both the Red Ribbon Army and Goku follow their signals to a remote point in the middle of the desert, but neither can find Pilaf. Goku, searching on foot, is suddenly attacked by automatic guns rising from the sand. Colonel Silver notices this and realizes Pilaf is hiding in an underground base. Pilaf, Mai, and Shu all try to escape on the flying fortress. Goku follows them and clings to the wall of the ship. The Red Ribbon Army is waiting for them with hundreds of fighter jets, and they destroy the fortress. Pilaf, Mai, and Shu parachute down and are forced to hand over the six-star ball.
| 33 | "Legend of the Dragon"; Transliteration: "Doragon no Densetsu" (Japanese: 龍の伝説) | Kazuhisa Takenouchi | Toshiki Inoue | Yukio Ebisawa | October 8, 1986 | February 15, 2002 (Funimation) October 22, 2003 (Blue Water) |
| 33 | "The Legend of a Dragon" (Funimation)"The Legend of the Dragon" (Blue Water) | Kazuhisa Takenouchi | Toshiki Inoue | Yukio Ebisawa | October 8, 1986 | February 15, 2002 (Funimation) October 22, 2003 (Blue Water) |
Goku calls the Nimbus Cloud to save him just before the flying fortress explodes. Then he heads off towards the nearest signal on the dragon radar. Back at Kame House, Master Roshi tells Krillin and Launch the legend of the Dragon Balls. Long ago, the seven balls were one, but evil forces tried to steal it. The ball split itself into seven useless parts, but when combined, they summon the eternal dragon who will grant one wish. Goku follows the radar to a forest where he finds the Red Ribbon Army also in search of the ball. The army is burning down the forest, so Goku tries to stop them. Suddenly, a monkey runs by holding the five-star ball. Colonel Silver shoots at it, causing the monkey to fly over the edge of a cliff. Goku grabs it, but the monkey drops the ball into a river.
| 34 | "The Heartless Red Ribbon"; Transliteration: "Hijō no Reddo Ribon" (Japanese: 非情のレッドリボン) | Yoshihiro Ueda | Keiji Terui | Masayuki Uchiyama | October 15, 1986 | February 18, 2002 (Funimation) October 23, 2003 (Blue Water) |
| 34 | "Cruel General Red" (Funimation)"Cruel Governor General Red Ribbon" (Blue Water) | Yoshihiro Ueda | Keiji Terui | Masayuki Uchiyama | October 15, 1986 | February 18, 2002 (Funimation) October 23, 2003 (Blue Water) |
While the Red Ribbon Army is searching the river for the five-star ball, Goku follows the dragon radar downstream and finds it. Before he can escape, Colonel Silver destroys the flying Nimbus. Angry, Goku easily defeats him. He finds some dyno caps in a nearby building and throws them. One is a robot, and the other is a plane. The robot flies the plane for Goku as he follows the nearest signal on the dragon radar. Goku instructs the robot to land the plane, but the robot's circuits freeze up in the extreme cold, so the plane crashes. Goku, frozen solid, is dragged away by a mysterious young girl.
| 35 | "Suno, Girl of the North"; Transliteration: "Kita no Shōjo Suno" (Japanese: 北の少女スノ) | Daisuke Nishio | Keiji Terui | Katsumi Aoshima | October 22, 1986 | February 19, 2002 (Funimation) October 24, 2003 (Blue Water) |
| 35 | "Cold Reception" (Funimation)"Suno, a Little Girl in a Northern Village" (Blue Water) | Daisuke Nishio | Keiji Terui | Katsumi Aoshima | October 22, 1986 | February 19, 2002 (Funimation) October 24, 2003 (Blue Water) |
The girl called Snow, takes Goku back to her house to recover. She and her mother explain that the Red Ribbon Army has taken their village chief hostage and are forcing the men to help them look for the Dragon Ball. The chief is being held in a fortress called Muscle Tower. Two soldiers break in, just as Goku is in the bathroom but Goku beats them. Snow gives Goku warm clothes to wear outside. Goku arrives at Muscle Tower and makes short work of the guards waiting outside. He uses his power pole to vault up onto the first level.
| 36 | "The Terror of Muscle Tower"; Transliteration: "Massuru Tawā no Kyōfu" (Japanese: マッスル塔の恐怖) | Minoru Okazaki | Keiji Terui | Minoru Maeda | October 29, 1986 | February 20, 2002 (Funimation) November 3, 2003 (Blue Water) |
| 36 | "Major Metallitron" (Funimation)"The Battle with Sergeant Metallic" (Blue Water) | Minoru Okazaki | Keiji Terui | Minoru Maeda | October 29, 1986 | February 20, 2002 (Funimation) November 3, 2003 (Blue Water) |
Goku enters the second floor of Muscle Tower and defeats the guards waiting for him. He heads up to the third floor where he finds a large android named Major Metallitron. Goku and Major start to fight, and after a few hits, Goku knocks him over. Goku is caught off guard when the giant gets up and grabs him. Major launches a missile at him, but he dodges it. Goku counters with a Kamehameha wave and blows Metallitron's head off. The android still moves though. Goku punches a hole through the robot's chest, but even that doesn't stop him. The fight finally ends when Major Metallitron's batteries die.
| 37 | "Enter Ninja Murasaki"; Transliteration: "Ninja Murasaki Sanjō" (Japanese: 忍者ムラサキ参上) | Kazuhisa Takenouchi | Michiru Shimada | Mitsuo Shindō | November 5, 1986 | February 21, 2002 (Funimation) November 4, 2003 (Blue Water) |
| 37 | "Ninja Murasaki is Coming!" | Kazuhisa Takenouchi | Michiru Shimada | Mitsuo Shindō | November 5, 1986 | February 21, 2002 (Funimation) November 4, 2003 (Blue Water) |
Goku enters the fourth floor of Muscle Tower and finds himself in the middle of a forest. Ninja Murasaki who is hiding, has been sent to kill Goku. After games of hide and seek, racing and shuriken throwing, Ninja Murasaki finally decides to fight, and Goku breaks his sword with the power pole. Murasaki throws a boomerang at him which hits and knocks out Goku.
| 38 | "Be Afraid!! The Split-Image Technique"; Transliteration: "Osorubeshi!! Bunshin no Jutsu" (Japanese: 恐るべし!! 分身の術) | Yūji Endō | Miho Maruo | Masayuki Uchiyama | November 12, 1986 | February 22, 2002 (Funimation) November 5, 2003 (Blue Water) |
| 38 | "Five Murasakis" (Funimation)"Multi-Murasakis vs Goku!" (Blue Water) | Yūji Endō | Miho Maruo | Masayuki Uchiyama | November 12, 1986 | February 22, 2002 (Funimation) November 5, 2003 (Blue Water) |
Goku recovers from his injury and begins to chase Murasaki. Murasaki, then Goku, cross a piranha invested lake. Murasaki decides to use his ultimate technique and seemingly splits into five. The five Murasakis nearly overwhelm Goku. They reveal that they are quintuplet brothers, not five parts of one person. Goku takes them out one by one. He chases the last Murasaki brother up to a cage. The ninja releases the monster within, Android 8.
| 39 | "The Mysterious Cyborg No. 8"; Transliteration: "Nazo no Jinzōningen Hachi-Gō" (Japanese: 謎の人造人間8号) | Kazuhisa Takenouchi | Keiji Terui | Yukio Ebisawa | November 19, 1986 | February 25, 2002 (Funimation) November 6, 2003 (Blue Water) |
| 39 | "Mysterious Android No. 8" (Funimation)"Android Number 8" (Blue Water) | Kazuhisa Takenouchi | Keiji Terui | Yukio Ebisawa | November 19, 1986 | February 25, 2002 (Funimation) November 6, 2003 (Blue Water) |
Ninja Murasaki releases Android 8 to fight Goku. Android 8 however refuses to fight. Murasaki threatens Android 8 with a remote to set off a bomb inside him. Goku stops Murasaki, destroys the remote and beats the ninja. Goku has walked into a labyrinth but cannot find a way past. Android 8 comes to repay Goku with help to get past the maze. Goku nicknames Android 8 "Eighter". They easily stop approaching soldiers. Finally they manage to get past the trick wall at the end of the maze. They find General White waiting for them in the 6th floor command room. General White won't give up and drops Goku and Eighter down a trapdoor.
| 40 | "What Now, Goku!!? The Horrible Buyon"; Transliteration: "Dō Suru Gokū!! Senritsu no Buyon" (Japanese: どうする悟空!! 戦慄のブヨン) | Yoshihiro Ueda | Michiru Shimada | Tomekichi Takeuchi | November 26, 1986 | February 26, 2002 (Funimation) November 7, 2003 (Blue Water) |
| 40 | "Horrifying Buyon" (Funimation)"The Horrifying Buyon!" (Blue Water) | Yoshihiro Ueda | Michiru Shimada | Tomekichi Takeuchi | November 26, 1986 | February 26, 2002 (Funimation) November 7, 2003 (Blue Water) |
Goku and Eighter land on 5th floor. General White releases a monster to destroy both of them. Meanwhile, Snow has found some sweet furry rodents. Eighter cowers at the other side of the room while Goku fights the monster Buyon. Goku can't even hurt Buyon. Buyon eats Goku, but he struggles out. Even a Kamehameha Wave doesn't affect Buyon. Goku saves Eighter from being eaten. Recalling an earlier exchange with Snow, Goku punches a hole in the wall letting in cold air and freezing Buyon solid. Goku smashes Buyon and ascends with Eighter back to the command room.
| 41 | "The End of Muscle Tower"; Transliteration: "Massuru Tawā no Saigo" (Japanese: マッスルタワーの最期) | Kazuhisa Takenouchi | Miho Maruo | Masayuki Uchiyama | December 3, 1986 | February 27, 2002 (Funimation) November 10, 2003 (Blue Water) |
| 41 | "The Fall of Muscle Tower" (Funimation)"The Last Day of Muscle Tower!" (Blue Water) | Kazuhisa Takenouchi | Miho Maruo | Masayuki Uchiyama | December 3, 1986 | February 27, 2002 (Funimation) November 10, 2003 (Blue Water) |
Goku fights General White who is not very fit. Eighter is too pacifistic to join in the fight as General White grabs Goku by the tail. After giving General White a severe bashing, the latter pretends to surrender and releases the village chief. When the chief's back is turned, General White threatens Goku and Eighter to shoot the chief. The chief is hesitant whether he wants to live or die. Then the General blackmails Eighter into beating Goku. Hearing this, an enraged Goku demands that White deal with him, and White promptly shoots Goku. Eighter loses his temper and punches General White out of the tower. Finally all three leave the tower and Eighter destroys it. They all receive a warm welcome back at Snow's house.
| 42 | "Imminent Danger!! Go for it, Ha-chan"; Transliteration: "Kiki Ippatsu!! Ganbare Hacchan" (Japanese: 危機一髪!! ガンバレ8ちゃん) | Minoru Okazaki | Keiji Terui | Mitsuo Shindō | December 10, 1986 | February 28, 2002 (Funimation) November 11, 2003 (Blue Water) |
| 42 | "The Secret of Dr. Flappe" (Funimation)"The Secret of Dr. Flappe!" (Blue Water) | Minoru Okazaki | Keiji Terui | Mitsuo Shindō | December 10, 1986 | February 28, 2002 (Funimation) November 11, 2003 (Blue Water) |
The village is safe again but Snow's parents wonder where the dragon ball was. Eighter had it all along so General White wouldn't exterminate the village. Unfortunately Eighter cannot risk staying in the village with the bomb still inside him. The chief suggests they go to Dr. Flappe to sort the problem. Goku has broken his dragon radar. While Snow, Goku and Eighter head to Dr. Flappe, Murasaki (who has survived) stalks them. Before Dr. Flappe can get to work, Murasaki surprises him. It is revealed Dr. Flappe created Eighter, working under the RR Army. Murasaki forces Dr. Flappe to steal Goku's dragon balls. Goku chases and beats the ninja. Dr. Flappe is able to take the bomb out of Eighter but cannot fix Goku's radar. Goku throws the bomb which kills Murasaki.
| 43 | "Bulma's House in Metro West"; Transliteration: "Nishi no Miyako no Buruma n'chi" (Japanese: 西の都のブルマんち) | Yoshihiro Ueda | Keiji Terui | Tomekichi Takeuchi | December 17, 1986 | March 1, 2002 (Funimation) November 12, 2003 (Blue Water) |
| 43 | "A Trip to the City" (Funimation)"Bulma's House in West City" (Blue Water) | Yoshihiro Ueda | Keiji Terui | Tomekichi Takeuchi | December 17, 1986 | March 1, 2002 (Funimation) November 12, 2003 (Blue Water) |
After spending a night in Snow's house one of the villagers helps Goku summon his Nimbus next morning. Goku reaches West City, but has no idea where to find Bulma. Nobody he meets has a clue. Goku does not have any money, but manages to win a lot in a street fighting competition. Along the way, Goku is abducted by a couple of thieving rogues, but they are far from a problem for him. Goku finds a policeman to direct him to Bulma's house which is the Capsule Corp where dyno caps were first invented.
| 44 | "Goku and Friends and Tons of Danger"; Transliteration: "Gokū to Nakama to Kiken ga Ippai" (Japanese: 悟空と仲間と危険がいっぱい) | Kazuhisa Takenouchi | Michiru Shimada | Masayuki Uchiyama | December 24, 1986 | March 4, 2002 (Funimation) November 13, 2003 (Blue Water) |
| 44 | "Master Thief, Hasky" (Funimation)"Commander Red Fights Back!" (Blue Water) | Kazuhisa Takenouchi | Michiru Shimada | Masayuki Uchiyama | December 24, 1986 | March 4, 2002 (Funimation) November 13, 2003 (Blue Water) |
Bulma is currently out. Bulma shortly returns skipping school hours. Bulma leads Goku and the policeman to the garden where Bulma's father is. While Bulma fixes the radar, her father fixes the policeman's motorcycle. Bulma finds Goku has procured two dragon balls. To come with Goku, Bulma demonstrates her Microband invention. Meanwhile, the RR Army are plotting against Goku. General Black has hired a master thief, Hasky, to get the balls from him. The thieving rogues team up with her. Goku and Bulma meet up with Yamcha, Puar and Oolong. They all decide to go to the new Dreamland amusement park. Hasky is ready to make her move.
| 45 | "Watch Out! A Mid-Air Trap"; Transliteration: "Ki o Tsukero! Kūchū no Wana" (Japanese: 気をつけろ! 空中の罠) | Kazuhisa Takenouchi; Storyboarded by : Tetsuo Imazawa | Michiru Shimada | Yukio Ebisawa | January 7, 1987 | March 5, 2002 (Funimation) November 14, 2003 (Blue Water) |
| 45 | "Danger in the Air" (Funimation)"Mayhem in Dreamland!" (Blue Water) | Kazuhisa Takenouchi; Storyboarded by : Tetsuo Imazawa | Michiru Shimada | Yukio Ebisawa | January 7, 1987 | March 5, 2002 (Funimation) November 14, 2003 (Blue Water) |
Goku's group enters the Dreamland amusement park, with Hasky and her two men stalking them. Hasky plans how to steal the Dragon Balls while Goku's group is having fun. Hasky baits the group into thinking she is a poor but promising fortuneteller. Goku makes it difficult for Hasky but with the Dragon Balls in Yamcha's possession, Hasky seizes her chance. Hasky's cover is shortly blown but she swipes the Dragon Balls. Hasky says she has planted a bomb to blow up Dreamland. Yamcha manages to tell Goku. On his Flying Nimbus, Goku chases Hasky's hover ship. Goku pins down Hasky, disarms the bomb and takes back the Dragon Balls. Bulma dumps Yamcha and she and Goku head off to search for the remaining Dragon Balls.

=== Season 4: General Blue Saga (1987) ===
| No. | Japanese title Dub title(s) | Directed by | Written by | Animation directed by | Original release date | English air dates |
|---|---|---|---|---|---|---|
| 46 | "Bulma's Big Failure"; Transliteration: "Buruma no Dai-Shippai" (Japanese: ブルマの大失敗) | Kazuhisa Takenouchi | Miho Maruo | Masayuki Uchiyama | January 14, 1987 | March 6, 2002 (Funimation) November 17, 2003 (Blue Water) |
| 46 | "Bulma's Bad Day" (Funimation)"Bulma's Bad Day!" (Blue Water) | Kazuhisa Takenouchi | Miho Maruo | Masayuki Uchiyama | January 14, 1987 | March 6, 2002 (Funimation) November 17, 2003 (Blue Water) |
Goku and Bulma head to an island to look for a dragon ball. The island however is under the control of General Blue of the RR Army. Goku lands on the island and Bulma finds only one dyno cap in her father's case, and there are several nudie mags. Bulma snatches the lot and gets frustrated and furious that her father is into this, and shreds them up. Goku dives into the ocean but cannot dive deep enough to find the dragon ball. Meanwhile, a couple of RR pilots are shooting at Bulma. As the pilots harass Bulma, Goku comes and blows them from the sky. Goku decides to go to Master Roshi's, much to Bulma's dismay.
| 47 | "Kame House is Discovered!!"; Transliteration: "Kame Hausu Hakken Saru!!" (Japanese: KAME HOUSE 発見さる!!) | Yūji Endō | Keiji Terui | Mitsuo Shindō | January 21, 1987 | March 7, 2002 (Funimation) November 18, 2003 (Blue Water) |
| 47 | "Kame House – Found!" (Funimation)"Kame House Discovered!" (Blue Water) | Yūji Endō | Keiji Terui | Mitsuo Shindō | January 21, 1987 | March 7, 2002 (Funimation) November 18, 2003 (Blue Water) |
As General Blue's men recover the scouts, Goku makes it to Roshi's island. Roshi offers the submarine (which Krillin and Launch are using) in exchange for Bulma's microband. Meanwhile, Commander Red orders General Blue to take action. Roshi attempts to use the microband for some indecent mischief, and Launch and Krillin return. While planning to find the dragon ball, Krillin mentions something about Pirates' Treasure and Master Roshi tells its tale. After Goku, Bulma and Krillin leave, a RR scout spies the island.
| 48 | "General Blue Begins Attacking!!"; Transliteration: "Burū Shōgun Kōgeki Kaishi!!" (Japanese: ブルー将軍攻撃開始!!) | Yoshihiro Ueda | Toshiki Inoue | Tomekichi Takeuchi | January 28, 1987 | March 8, 2002 (Funimation) November 19, 2003 (Blue Water) |
| 48 | "Deep Blue Sea" (Funimation)"General Blue Attacks!" (Blue Water) | Yoshihiro Ueda | Toshiki Inoue | Tomekichi Takeuchi | January 28, 1987 | March 8, 2002 (Funimation) November 19, 2003 (Blue Water) |
Krillin manages to maneuver the air/sub ship to the location where the dragon ball is. General Blue plans to tail Goku, while another squad heads to Roshi's Island. Despite their searching, Bulma, Krillin and Goku do not find the dragon ball on the ocean bed. Meanwhile, General Blue prepares and launches all his forces. As Krillin drives the sub into a cave, General Blue's submarines tail and attack them. Krillin makes it to narrower caves, but General Blue sends his mini-subs to pursue them.
| 49 | "Lunch-san in Danger"; Transliteration: "Ayaushi Ranchi-san" (Japanese: 危うしランチさん) | Kazuhisa Takenouchi; Storyboarded by : Tatsuo Higashino | Yasushi Hirano | Masayuki Uchiyama | February 4, 1987 | March 11, 2002 (Funimation) November 20, 2003 (Blue Water) |
| 49 | "Roshi Surprise" (Funimation)"Watch Out Launch!" (Blue Water) | Kazuhisa Takenouchi; Storyboarded by : Tatsuo Higashino | Yasushi Hirano | Masayuki Uchiyama | February 4, 1987 | March 11, 2002 (Funimation) November 20, 2003 (Blue Water) |
General Blue's forces attack Kame House, only to be easily defeated by Master Roshi and Launch.
| 50 | "The Pirates' Trap"; Transliteration: "Kaizoku-tachi no Wana" (Japanese: 海かい賊ぞくたちのワナ) | Minoru Okazaki | Toshiki Inoue | Minoru Maeda | February 11, 1987 | March 12, 2002 (Funimation) November 21, 2003 (Blue Water) |
| 50 | "The Trap is Sprung" (Funimation)"The Pirate Trap!" (Blue Water) | Minoru Okazaki | Toshiki Inoue | Minoru Maeda | February 11, 1987 | March 12, 2002 (Funimation) November 21, 2003 (Blue Water) |
Goku, Krillin, and Bulma arrive at a pirate trap. Although Goku and Krillin are able to easily bypass it by jumping, Bulma needs assistance. General Blue's forces pursue and are instantly wiped out by the trap.
| 51 | "The Security Guard at the Bottom of the Ocean"; Transliteration: "Kaitei no Gādoman" (Japanese: 海底のガードマン) | Kazuhisa Takenouchi | Keiji Terui | Katsumi Aoshima | February 18, 1987 | March 13, 2002 (Funimation) November 24, 2003 (Blue Water) |
| 51 | "Beware of Robot" (Funimation)"Rise of the Robot Pirate" (Blue Water) | Kazuhisa Takenouchi | Keiji Terui | Katsumi Aoshima | February 18, 1987 | March 13, 2002 (Funimation) November 24, 2003 (Blue Water) |
Goku and Krillin fight the Pirate robot in between evading its heavy machine gun and sword. Krillin manages to disarm the sword from it. General Blue stays in hiding watching the fight. Bulma fires a gun cannon on the robot as it skis across a pool. As Goku fights the robot with his power pole, Bulma rams a truck on it. Next, the robot drags Goku into an underwater battle, Goku narrowly escaping. The robot chases Bulma and Krillin through the hideout where all the pirates are dead. Goku recovers and rescues the other two. Goku performs an aerial attack smashing the robot. As everyone makes their way through the inner halls, the place begins to collapse. Goku takes a different route from the others. Bulma, Krillin and General Blue dive into a well.
| 52 | "We Did It! Treasure Discovered"; Transliteration: "Yatta! Otakara Hakken" (Japanese: やった! お宝発見) | Yoshihiro Ueda | Toshiki Inoue | Masayuki Uchiyama | February 25, 1987 | March 14, 2002 (Funimation) November 25, 2003 (Blue Water) |
| 52 | "The Pirate Treasure" (Funimation)"We Found the Treasure!" (Blue Water) | Yoshihiro Ueda | Toshiki Inoue | Masayuki Uchiyama | February 25, 1987 | March 14, 2002 (Funimation) November 25, 2003 (Blue Water) |
As the hideout continues to collapse, Goku reaches a dead end and falls down a trapdoor onto a giant octopus. Krillin and Bulma emerge into a room with a booby trapped 10-armed statue and three chests, and General Blue emerges. Krillin disarms the statue and opens the gold chest while Goku blasts and eats the octopus. Bulma inserts a key in the statue and General Blue shows himself to the two. General Blue mocks Krillin as he fights him. Goku hears the fight and swims to them. General Blue demonstrates that he is very sensitive about his good looks and stuns Krillin, making it easy to beat him. General Blue isn't affected by Bulma's charms. Goku arrives just before General Blue can kill Krillin.
| 53 | "The Eyes that Sparkle with Terror"; Transliteration: "Kyōfu no Hikaru Me" (Japanese: 恐怖の光る眼) | Daisuke Nishio | Michiru Shimada | Mitsuo Shindō | March 4, 1987 | March 18, 2002 (Funimation) November 26, 2003 (Blue Water) |
| 53 | "Blue, Black and Blue" (Funimation)"Ominous Grotto!" (Blue Water) | Daisuke Nishio | Michiru Shimada | Mitsuo Shindō | March 4, 1987 | March 18, 2002 (Funimation) November 26, 2003 (Blue Water) |
Goku and Blue start fighting and Goku is winning until Blue powers up. Meanwhile, the whole ceiling is collapsing. He is just about to kill Goku when a mouse scares him. Goku gets up and beats Blue. Bulma and Krillin want to get out before the ceiling falls, but Goku wants to find the dragon ball. Once he gets it, he picks the mouse that saved him and runs, but Bulma and Krillin are about to leave.
| 54 | "Run! Run! The Great Escape"; Transliteration: "Nigero ya Nigero!! Dai-Dasshutsu" (Japanese: 逃げろや逃げろ!! 大脱出) | Kazuhisa Takenouchi | Keiji Terui | Masayuki Uchiyama | March 11, 1987 | October 21, 2002 (Funimation) November 27, 2003 (Blue Water) |
| 54 | "Escape From Pirate Cave" (Funimation)"Escape From Pirate Cave!" (Blue Water) | Kazuhisa Takenouchi | Keiji Terui | Masayuki Uchiyama | March 11, 1987 | October 21, 2002 (Funimation) November 27, 2003 (Blue Water) |
Goku makes it to the getaway submarine in the nick of time, still carrying the mouse in his mouth. As the trio escape, rocks collapse and hit the sub and it soon runs out of fuel. Goku manages to launch the sub to the surface with a Kamehameha Wave. Bulma has managed to take one diamond with her. General Blue also reaches the surface. In the Blue Sector HQ, Goku fiddles with the radio. As the trio make their way to Master Roshi's, General Blue follows. As Roshi gets the diamond, he is forced to hand it to aggressive Launch who makes off with it. General Blue lands on the island preparing for revenge.
| 55 | "'Lo! Chased to Penguin Village"; Transliteration: "Ncha! Otte Pengin Mura" (Japanese: んちゃ! 追ってペンギン村) | Yoshihiro Ueda | Michiru Shimada | Tomekichi Takeuchi | March 18, 1987 | October 22, 2002 (Funimation) November 28, 2003 (Blue Water) |
| 55 | "Penguin Village" (Funimation)"Penguin Village!" (Blue Water) | Yoshihiro Ueda | Michiru Shimada | Tomekichi Takeuchi | March 18, 1987 | October 22, 2002 (Funimation) November 28, 2003 (Blue Water) |
General Blue binds the occupants of the Kame house with rope he powered with psychic waves. General Blue then steals the dragon balls and sets a 5 minute bomb. Gentle Launch makes it in time to release Goku and Goku throws out the bomb. Goku then chases General Blue. As Goku and General Blue speed up to max, they both fly across a strange island. A speedy girl with a couple of sprites watch in awe. General Blue causes Goku to fall but crashes his jet into a mountain.
| 56 | "Woohoo! Arale Rides the Cloud"; Transliteration: "Uhohōi! Arare Kumo ni Noru" (Japanese: うほほーい! アラレ雲にのる) | Kazuhisa Takenouchi; Storyboarded by : Yukio Ebisawa | Toshiki Inoue | Yukio Ebisawa | March 25, 1987 | October 23, 2002 (Funimation) January 5, 2004 (Blue Water) |
| 56 | "Strange Visitor" (Funimation)"There's a Stranger in Town!" (Blue Water) | Kazuhisa Takenouchi; Storyboarded by : Yukio Ebisawa | Toshiki Inoue | Yukio Ebisawa | March 25, 1987 | October 23, 2002 (Funimation) January 5, 2004 (Blue Water) |
The girl introduces herself as Arale and the sprites are Gatchans 1 and 2. Blue flees before Goku can find him. Arale and Gatchans 1 and 2 catch up with Goku and are able to ride on the Nimbus with him. Blue meets Sour Man and commandeers his car. Goku meets a lady called Akuma and a policeman called Toro, both incapable of riding the Nimbus. The mention of the RR Army terrifies Toro. Blue meets someone who resembles his little brother and attacks Toro and his partners. As Goku tries to find the General, Arale bumps into Blue, and she and Gatchans 1 and 2 try to socialise with him, to Blue's horror. Goku fails to find Blue and cannot get the dragon radar to work. Arale takes Goku to a doctor to get it fixed.
| 57 | "A Face-off! Arale vs. Blue"; Transliteration: "Taiketsu! Arare tai Burū" (Japanese: 対決！アラレVSブルー) | Minoru Okazaki | Keiji Terui | Minoru Maeda | April 8, 1987 | October 24, 2002 (Funimation) January 6, 2004 (Blue Water) |
| 57 | "Arale vs. Blue" (Funimation)"Arale vs General Blue!" (Blue Water) | Minoru Okazaki | Keiji Terui | Minoru Maeda | April 8, 1987 | October 24, 2002 (Funimation) January 6, 2004 (Blue Water) |
Senbei attempts to fix the dragon radar while Officer Toro stumbles in the coffee shop. Baby Turbo manages to help Senbei fix the radar. Blue arrives and waits for his chance to steal the plane by the family's house. Blue tries to avoid detection from Goku's fixed radar. The police at the station are getting trigger happy. Goku finds Blue by surprise and Blue threatens Arale with a knife in front of the family. Blue stuns Goku and swipes his radar. Before Blue can kill Goku, Arale jumps in and chases him through Penguin village. Meanwhile, a small fight occurs between the police and a couple of aliens, mistaken for the Red Ribbon Army. Turbo offers to make a new radar for the one Goku lost. Blue is shown making contact with Red from a desolated area.

=== Season 5: Commander Red Saga (1987) ===
| No. | Japanese title Dub title(s) | Directed by | Written by | Animation directed by | Original release date | English air dates |
|---|---|---|---|---|---|---|
| 58 | "The Sacred, Yet Ominous Land of Karin"; Transliteration: "Makyō no Seichi Karin" (Japanese: 魔境の聖地カリン) | Daisuke Nishio | Toshiki Inoue | Masayuki Uchiyama | April 15, 1987 | October 28, 2002 (Funimation) January 7, 2004 (Blue Water) |
| 58 | "The Land of Korin" (Funimation)"The Holy Land of Korin" (Blue Water) | Daisuke Nishio | Toshiki Inoue | Masayuki Uchiyama | April 15, 1987 | October 28, 2002 (Funimation) January 7, 2004 (Blue Water) |
In the Land of Korin, Captain Yellow finds another dragon ball in a volcano crater. Near a massive tower that reaches the sky, Bora and his son Upa are fishing. As Captain Yellow's men retrieve the dragon ball, the volcano erupts. Bora gets hold of the dragon ball. As Yellow and his men land, Bora demands they leave. When they see him carrying the dragon ball they attack him but Bora resists. Bora kills a grenadier who comes from behind him and beats down Yellow's men. Yellow kidnaps Upa to blackmail Bora. Goku arrives in time to defeat Yellow and save Upa (who is able to ride the Nimbus). The dragon ball Bora has is the very one Goku was looking for. Meanwhile, the guards of the RR base hardly recognize General Blue on his arrival. Commander Red has summoned the infamous Mercenary Tao.
| 59 | "It's Him! The World's Greatest Assassin, Taopaipai"; Transliteration: "Kita! Sekaiichi no Koroshiya Taopaipai" (Japanese: きた!世界一の殺し屋 "桃白白") | Kazuhisa Takenouchi | Keiji Terui | Katsumi Aoshima | April 22, 1987 | October 29, 2002 (Funimation) January 8, 2004 (Blue Water) |
| 59 | "The Notorious Mercenary" (Funimation)"The Terrifying Tao Pai Pai!" (Blue Water) | Kazuhisa Takenouchi | Keiji Terui | Katsumi Aoshima | April 22, 1987 | October 29, 2002 (Funimation) January 8, 2004 (Blue Water) |
General Blue enters the RR base and meets with Commander Red. Despite procuring the dragon radar, Red is displeased with Blue and offers him a second chance if he can defeat Mercenary Tao. He fails and Mercenary Tao easily kills him. Meanwhile, Bora tells Goku the legend of the Korin Tower. After being briefed on his target, Tao travels on a flying pillar to Korin's Land. As Goku, Bora and Upa are enjoying themselves, Tao storms in and Bora fights him. Bora is killed by Tao, leaving Upa in grief and Goku in anger.
| 60 | "A Battle!! The Kamehameha vs. the Dodonpa"; Transliteration: "Shōbu!! Kamehameha tai Dodonpa" (Japanese: 勝負!!カメハメ波VSどどん波) | Daisuke Nishio | Keiji Terui | Mitsuo Shindō | April 29, 1987 | October 30, 2002 (Funimation) January 9, 2004 (Blue Water) |
| 60 | "Tao Attacks!" (Funimation)"Facing the Dodon Wave!" (Blue Water) | Daisuke Nishio | Keiji Terui | Mitsuo Shindō | April 29, 1987 | October 30, 2002 (Funimation) January 9, 2004 (Blue Water) |
Goku fights Tao, taking a severe beating. A Kamehameha Wave has no effect on Tao, but it sears his outfit. Angered, Tao fires a lethal beam (Dodon Ray) on Goku. Tao takes the dragon balls and taunts Upa before making his leave. Tao heads to a town to get a new outfit, while Red tells him that he is one dragon ball short. Upa has buried his father and is about to bury Goku when an RR pilot lands. As the pilot tries to take the dragon ball Goku kept, Goku beats him and blasts his jet. Apparently Goku's grandfather's dragon ball blocked the Dodon Wave. Goku begins to climb the Korin Tower, while Tao waits for his outfit to be tailored to Red's frustration.
| 61 | "Karin-sama of Karin Tower"; Transliteration: "Karin-Tō no Karin-sama" (Japanese: カリン塔のカリン様) | Yoshihiro Ueda | Michiru Shimada | Tomekichi Takeuchi | May 6, 1987 | November 4, 2002 (Funimation) January 12, 2004 (Blue Water) |
| 61 | "Korin Tower" (Funimation)"Korin of the Korin Tower" (Blue Water) | Yoshihiro Ueda | Michiru Shimada | Tomekichi Takeuchi | May 6, 1987 | November 4, 2002 (Funimation) January 12, 2004 (Blue Water) |
Goku eventually reaches the summit of Korin's tower. Goku is then met with Korin, who is not about to hand the sacred water to Goku. An assassin fails to kill Mercenary Tao as he heads to his usual luxurious hotel to take a boiling hot bath. Korin seems to be deceitful not letting Goku take the bottle of sacred water. After a long hard attempt trying to get the sacred water, Korin reveals that Master Roshi was the first to climb the tower and it took him three years to get the water.
| 62 | "What Will the Effect of the Super Spirit Water Be!?"; Transliteration: "Hatashite!? Chōseisui no Kikime" (Japanese: 果して!?超聖水のききめ) | Kazuhisa Takenouchi | Michiru Shimada | Masayuki Uchiyama | May 13, 1987 | November 5, 2002 (Funimation) January 13, 2004 (Blue Water) |
| 62 | "Sacred Water" (Funimation)"Magic Water" (Blue Water) | Kazuhisa Takenouchi | Michiru Shimada | Masayuki Uchiyama | May 13, 1987 | November 5, 2002 (Funimation) January 13, 2004 (Blue Water) |
Goku attempts to snatch the sacred water from Korin with his "After Image" technique which is no surprise to Korin. The next day Korin gives Goku a Sensu Bean to last Goku's appetite and energy for 10 days. Korin throws Goku's dragon ball out of the tower forcing Goku to run down and up the tower again. Goku attempts to take the sacred water while Korin sleeps, but thinks better of it. Goku tries long and hard for the next two days to get the sacred water. Mercenary Tao realises how he wasn't able to kill Goku. Goku attempts to read Korin by mimicking his every move. The very next day, Goku finally manages to get the sacred water. To his disappointment it doesn't strengthen him, but all that exercise did him good. Tao kills the tailor who made his outfit before leaving.
| 63 | "Son Goku's Revenge"; Transliteration: "Son Gokū no Gyakushū" (Japanese: 孫悟空の逆襲) | Yoshihiro Ueda; Storyboarded by : Yukio Ebisawa | Keiji Terui | Yukio Ebisawa | May 20, 1987 | November 6, 2002 (Funimation) January 14, 2004 (Blue Water) |
| 63 | "The Return of Goku" (Funimation)"Goku Returns!" (Blue Water) | Yoshihiro Ueda; Storyboarded by : Yukio Ebisawa | Keiji Terui | Yukio Ebisawa | May 20, 1987 | November 6, 2002 (Funimation) January 14, 2004 (Blue Water) |
Tao arrives and bullies Upa. Goku arrives to save him and rounds on Tao. After some small talk, Goku demonstrates his speed and strength on Tao. Tao also happens to know the legend of Korin's tower and the sacred water. Goku blocks most attacks from Tao to Upa's surprise. Meanwhile, Bulma is working on a new scout plane to assist Goku. Goku beats Tao a lot. Tao's Dodon Ray only singes Goku's hands. Tao resorts to wielding a sword on Goku, but Upa fetches Goku his power pole and Goku breaks Tao's sword. Tao kicks a stone, missing Upa and destroying the teepee. Tao decides to climb the tower to get the sacred water.
| 64 | "The End of Taopaipai"; Transliteration: "Saigo no Taopaipai" (Japanese: 最後の桃白白) | Minoru Okazaki | Shun'ichi Yukimuro | Minoru Maeda | May 27, 1987 | November 7, 2002 (Funimation) January 15, 2004 (Blue Water) |
| 64 | "The Last of Mercenary Tao" (Funimation)"The End of Tao Pai Pai!" (Blue Water) | Minoru Okazaki | Shun'ichi Yukimuro | Minoru Maeda | May 27, 1987 | November 7, 2002 (Funimation) January 15, 2004 (Blue Water) |
While Mercenary Tao tires himself climbing the tower, Goku enjoys his moments with Upa who is amazed at Goku's confidence. Meanwhile, Bulma's dragon radar is malfunctioning due to some radar jamming situation which is also affecting Commander Red. Tao reaches the tower summit and meets Korin. Arrogant Tao drinks the sacred water and Korin tricks him into thinking his strength is boosted. In addition, Korin gives Tao a dark cloud to ride. Korin then causes Tao to plummet to the ground. Tao beats Goku, but Goku was just taking blows to read his moves. Tao acts as if to surrender and throws a napalm grenade at Goku, but Goku kicks it back. The bomb explodes right in front of Tao, killing him. Meanwhile, Bulma has finished engineering her radar against the radar jammer, which also boosts Goku's. Goku is off to defeat the RR at their HQ.
| 65 | "Go, Goku! Commence Assault"; Transliteration: "Yuke Gokū! Totsugeki Kaishi" (Japanese: ゆけ悟空!突撃開始) | Daisuke Nishio | Toshiki Inoue | Masayuki Uchiyama | June 10, 1987 | November 8, 2002 (Funimation) January 16, 2004 (Blue Water) |
| 65 | "Confront the Red Ribbon Army" (Funimation)"Goku Travels to Red Ribbon Headquarters" (Blue Water) | Daisuke Nishio | Toshiki Inoue | Masayuki Uchiyama | June 10, 1987 | November 8, 2002 (Funimation) January 16, 2004 (Blue Water) |
Commander Red receives word that Colonel Violet has tracked another dragon ball. Her divers successfully procure the ball. As they are attacked by a giant alligator and savages, Violet selfishly leaves her men to die, giving her the chance to escape with the ball. Violet hands the ball to Commander Red, receiving a pint-sized reward. Bulma has completed her spy camera to find Goku and launches it. As Goku makes his way to the RR HQ, Commander Red is convinced it is Mercenary Tao. Bulma's spy camera is destroyed when it hovers above the RR base. Bulma, Launch and Roshi realise Goku is making a direct attack on the RR base. Yamcha, Oolong and Puar receive the news and take off with the others to follow Goku.
| 66 | "The Red Ribbon Army Desperately Fights Back"; Transliteration: "Reddo Ribon Gun Hisshi no Kōbō" (Japanese: レッドリボン軍必死の攻防) | Kazuhisa Takenouchi | Keiji Terui | Katsumi Aoshima | June 17, 1987 | November 11, 2002 (Funimation) January 19, 2004 (Blue Water) |
| 66 | "A Real Bind" (Funimation)"Showdown with the Red Ribbon Army!" (Blue Water) | Kazuhisa Takenouchi | Keiji Terui | Katsumi Aoshima | June 17, 1987 | November 11, 2002 (Funimation) January 19, 2004 (Blue Water) |
While Yamcha and the others are flying after Goku, they decide to find Krillin. They find Krillin swimming but he flees before he realises they are here to pick him up. Goku beats a scout out of the sky and his cover is blown. Goku gets past the defenses and penetrates the base perimeter. All at once, he has the entire army on top of him. Yamcha flies the plane into the RR sector barely escaping a heat seeker missile. Colonel Violet is grabbing every scrap of money she can get. Goku infiltrates Red's command building as Commander Red retreats to his office with General Black.
| 67 | "Commander Red Perishes!!"; Transliteration: "Reddo Sōsui Shisu!!" (Japanese: レッド総帥死す!!) | Daisuke Nishio | Yasushi Hirano | Mitsuo Shindō | June 24, 1987 | November 12, 2002 (Funimation) January 20, 2004 (Blue Water) |
| 67 | "The End of Commander Red" (Funimation)"Commander Red's Final Bow" (Blue Water) | Daisuke Nishio | Yasushi Hirano | Mitsuo Shindō | June 24, 1987 | November 12, 2002 (Funimation) January 20, 2004 (Blue Water) |
The warfare against Goku continues for the RR Army. Then, the soldiers flee in terror except for Colonel Violet who is heading for Red's treasure vault. Violet swipes all the money and valuables and makes her leave. Red gets frustrated and angry and leaves Black to face Goku as he retreats to his penthouse. As Goku beats Black, Red activates the ceiling to crush Goku. Black kills Red when he discovers that Red wants to use the dragon balls to make himself taller rather than use them for world domination. Goku emerges from the wreckage and Black tries to talk his way out, but Goku won't fall for his lies. As a last resort Black uses a mech robot machine to take out Goku. Meanwhile, Yamcha and Violet are both trying to evade each other. Commander Black beats Goku plenty and is preparing to fire a lethal weapon on him.
| 68 | "The Last Dragon Ball"; Transliteration: "Saigo no Doragon Bōru" (Japanese: 最後のドラゴンボール) | Yoshihiro Ueda | Shun'ichi Yukimuro | Tomekichi Takeuchi | July 1, 1987 | November 13, 2002 (Funimation) January 21, 2004 (Blue Water) |
| 68 | "The Last Dragon Ball" (Funimation)"The Last Dragon Ball!" (Blue Water) | Yoshihiro Ueda | Shun'ichi Yukimuro | Tomekichi Takeuchi | July 1, 1987 | November 13, 2002 (Funimation) January 21, 2004 (Blue Water) |
As Yamcha nears the RR base, Goku evades Black's laser cannon. Black uses all he has got against him, and Goku destroys the robot mech suit along with Black. Goku now has six Dragon Balls but cannot track the last one. By the time Yamcha and the others arrive, the war is over and Goku reunites with the lot. Goku's success in crippling the RR Army amazes everyone. Puar scouts around the RR base with her ability to fly, but she finds no one. Even Goku's climbing Korin's Tower surprises Roshi. Bulma promises to fix the Dragon Radar and Goku promises to have Bora resurrected.

=== Season 6: Fortuneteller Baba Saga (1987) ===
| No. | Japanese title Dub title(s) | Directed by | Written by | Animation directed by | Original release date | English air dates |
|---|---|---|---|---|---|---|
| 69 | "The Possibly Cute Fortuneteller Baba"; Transliteration: "Kyūto na!? Uranai Baba" (Japanese: キュートな!?占いババ) | Kazuhisa Takenouchi | Michiru Shimada | Masayuki Uchiyama | July 8, 1987 | November 14, 2002 (Funimation) October 4, 2004 (Blue Water) |
| 69 | "Who is Fortuneteller Baba?" | Kazuhisa Takenouchi | Michiru Shimada | Masayuki Uchiyama | July 8, 1987 | November 14, 2002 (Funimation) October 4, 2004 (Blue Water) |
Bulma finds there is nothing wrong with the dragon radar and thinks something organic may have swallowed the ball that puts the ball off detection. Roshi suggests Goku visits Fortuneteller Baba to find the last Dragon Ball with her clairvoyance. Goku takes off with Yamcha, Puar and Krillin. They stop at a town and Goku needs to get a new suit of clothes. While a new martial suit is being made, Goku takes Upa on the adventure with him. After changing into his new clothes, Goku and his friends head off to Fortuneteller Baba's palace, passing desert tornadoes and storms. They are greeted by Fortuneteller Baba's assistant Ghost at the palace. A group of mean-looking visitors enter the palace and leave in a devastated state. Goku and the others enter and meet Fortuneteller Baba herself who is not what they expected. Baba is asking a huge price for a single fortune and Goku's only alternative is to battle five warriors of Baba's.
| 70 | "Attack! We Five Fighters"; Transliteration: "Totsugeki! Warera Gonin no Senshi" (Japanese: 突撃!われら5人の戦士) | Yoshihiro Ueda; Storyboarded by : Haruki Iwanami | Keiji Terui | Yukio Ebisawa | July 15, 1987 | November 15, 2002 (Funimation) October 5, 2004 (Blue Water) |
| 70 | "We are the Five Warriors" (Funimation)"The Five Warriors" (Blue Water) | Yoshihiro Ueda; Storyboarded by : Haruki Iwanami | Keiji Terui | Yukio Ebisawa | July 15, 1987 | November 15, 2002 (Funimation) October 5, 2004 (Blue Water) |
Yamcha, Krillin and Goku feel up to fighting while Upa and Puar choose to stay back. Krillin starts against Fangs the Vampire. Krillin misses every time, and is beaten when Fangs sinks his fangs into Krillin's scalp and suck almost all of his blood. Krillin loses a lot of blood and Fangs pushes him into the lake with a knee kick. Ghost attends to Krillin's blood loss. Unsuspecting Upa and Puar volunteer to be the next to fight Fangs together, which Fangs agrees to. Scared but determined, Upa breathes crunched up garlic in Fangs' face. Fangs then rounds on Puar, but she turns into porcupine that impales Fangs' jaws. Upa then used his resemblance to form the cross of Jesus Christ which scares Fangs, and he transformed into a bat to retreat. Puar then turns into a giant hand and slaps Fangs into the lake. Yamcha chooses to fight next. Baba tells Yamcha he is fighting an invisible warrior. While Yamcha's attempts are unsuccessful, Krillin sends Goku to fetch Bulma and Roshi. Yamcha tries hearing the invisible man out.
| 71 | "A Bloody and Desperate Battle!"; Transliteration: "Kesshi no Dairyūkessen" (Japanese: 決死の大流血戦) | Minoru Okazaki | Shun'ichi Yukimuro | Minoru Maeda | July 22, 1987 | November 18, 2002 (Funimation) October 6, 2004 (Blue Water) |
| 71 | "Deadly Battle" (Funimation)"The Deadly and Bloody Battle!" (Blue Water) | Minoru Okazaki | Shun'ichi Yukimuro | Minoru Maeda | July 22, 1987 | November 18, 2002 (Funimation) October 6, 2004 (Blue Water) |
Goku locates Roshi and Bulma in their capsule ship. Goku collects Roshi and Bulma in a careless manner then makes the ship swerve down and aggressive Launch takes control in the nick of time. Yamcha's hearing the invisible man works out at first until Baba starts singing awfully. Yamcha takes repetitive blows. Krillin diverts the invisible man with applause giving Yamcha the chance to fight back, but the invisible man becomes silent and starts devastating Yamcha. Goku arrives with Roshi and Bulma. With a thrust of Bulma's breasts, Krillin causes Roshi to have a violent nosebleed right on the invisible man, exposing him to Yamcha. Yamcha beats the invisible man with a Wolf Fang Fist, making him surrender. Roshi reveals that Baba is his older sister. For the next fight, Baba leads the whole lot into her creepy tower. Yamcha is to fight in a realm called "The Devil's Toilet". Baba takes Goku to her home room, serving him a meal while testing his reflexes. Baba has creepy ideas in store for Goku and his friends.
| 72 | "Meet Son Goku! The Demons' Toilet"; Transliteration: "Gokū Kenzan! Akuma no Benjo" (Japanese: 悟空見参!悪魔の便所) | Kazuhisa Takenouchi | Toshiki Inoue | Masayuki Uchiyama | July 29, 1987 | November 19, 2002 (Funimation) October 7, 2004 (Blue Water) |
| 72 | "Goku's Turn" (Funimation)"The Perils of Devil's Toilet!" (Blue Water) | Kazuhisa Takenouchi | Toshiki Inoue | Masayuki Uchiyama | July 29, 1987 | November 19, 2002 (Funimation) October 7, 2004 (Blue Water) |
Baba summons a coffin. Out comes Yamcha's opponent, a mummified warrior. The mummy is a lot faster and stronger than he looks and Yamcha nearly falls in the Devil's Toilet. The mummy beats Yamcha despite his attempt to retaliate a surprise attack as the gang watched in horror, threatening to crush him by breaking his limbs if he refuse to surrender. Unable to watch his master being tortured in the fight, Puar has finally had enough. He cuts in and transformed into a woodpecker to peck the mummy, forcing him to release Yamcha, but it makes matters worse; the mummy knocked down Puar to the ground with Yamcha and he was seemingly dead (he was only knocked out and not dead). Furiously pained by the loss of his shape shifting friend, Yamcha tries his last effort to defeat the mummy, but was too weaken from the beating. The mummy then grabs Yamcha and forces him to give up or fall into the Devil's Toilet. When Yamcha refuses, he drops him into the green lava of the Devil's Toilet. Goku saves Yamcha with his Power Pole thus Baba decides he's already lost, and while Yamcha and Puar recovered to watch with the others, he enters the next fight.
| 73 | "What is the Deadly Devil Might Beam!?"; Transliteration: "Hissatsu Akumaitokōsen to wa!?" (Japanese: 必殺アクマイト光線とは!?) | Yoshihiro Ueda | Yasushi Hirano | Katsumi Aoshima | August 5, 1987 | November 20, 2002 (Funimation) October 11, 2004 (Blue Water) |
| 73 | "The Devilmite Beam" (Funimation)"A Deadly Dance on Devil's Tongues" (Blue Water) | Yoshihiro Ueda | Yasushi Hirano | Katsumi Aoshima | August 5, 1987 | November 20, 2002 (Funimation) October 11, 2004 (Blue Water) |
The mummy feels a bit hesitant to fight Goku. Goku whets the mummy's appetite and counter-strikes. The mummy binds Goku with his own bandages. After a long struggle, Goku jumps down just beyond the deadly toilet water and breaks free. Goku defeats the mummy with a single punch. Goku's next opponent is a demon called Spike. The demon seems easy to beat and he nearly falls in the toilet. Spike prepares to use his Devilmite beam to finish Goku.
| 74 | "The Mysterious Fifth Man"; Transliteration: "Nazo no Goninme no Otoko" (Japanese: なぞの五人目の男) | Kazuhisa Takenouchi; Storyboarded by : Haruki Iwanami | Hiroko Miyazaki | Mitsuo Shindō | August 12, 1987 | November 21, 2002 (Funimation) October 12, 2004 (Blue Water) |
| 74 | "The Mysterious Fifth Man" (Funimation)"The Mysterious Fifth Fighter" (Blue Water) | Kazuhisa Takenouchi; Storyboarded by : Haruki Iwanami | Hiroko Miyazaki | Mitsuo Shindō | August 12, 1987 | November 21, 2002 (Funimation) October 12, 2004 (Blue Water) |
Master Roshi briefs the others on the story of Spike. Spike fires his Devilmite beam on Goku. Goku resists the beam entirely. Spike fires a stronger Devilmite beam. Goku resists that one entirely as well. Spike then flails a trident at Goku. A mysterious man wearing a cat mask and a halo on his head has been watching Goku closely. Goku almost falls in the Devil's Toilet but climbs on the other side of the bridge and surprises Spike. Goku finishes Spike with a mighty kick. The final fighter requests Baba that he and Goku fight outside. Roshi senses some familiarity about the fifth fighter. The fight begins.
| 75 | "A Clash!! Powerful Adversaries"; Transliteration: "Gekitotsu!! Kyōteki Dōshi" (Japanese: 激突!!強敵同志) | Yoshihiro Ueda | Michiru Shimada | Tomekichi Takeuchi | August 19, 1987 | November 22, 2002 (Funimation) October 13, 2004 (Blue Water) |
| 75 | "The Strong Ones" (Funimation)"The Clash for the Dragon Ball" (Blue Water) | Yoshihiro Ueda | Michiru Shimada | Tomekichi Takeuchi | August 19, 1987 | November 22, 2002 (Funimation) October 13, 2004 (Blue Water) |
The final fight begins with a struggle. Both opponents are evenly matched. The masked man launches Goku in the air and sends him crashing through the stage, but Goku attacks back. The masked man launches a Kamehameha Wave, which Goku avoids. Goku does his own Kamehameha Wave on the masked man, causing him to fell on the ground and lands a knee blow on him. Goku believes he has won, but it was not over. The masked man grabs Goku's tail, disabling him through his weakness from fighting and starts slamming him. The masked man is becoming more familiar to Roshi all the time and he has a good idea who is under the mask. Roshi reveals to the gang that the man is none other than Goku's deceased grandfather Son Gohan, much to Goku's friends big shock.
| 76 | "The Identity of the Masked Man"; Transliteration: "Kamen Otoko no Shōtai ha!?" (Japanese: 仮面男の正体は!?) | Minoru Okazaki | Yasushi Hirano | Taichiro Ohara | August 26, 1987 | November 25, 2002 (Funimation) October 14, 2004 (Blue Water) |
| 76 | "True Colors of the Masked Man" (Funimation)"Goku's Grandfather Gohan" (Blue Water) | Minoru Okazaki | Yasushi Hirano | Taichiro Ohara | August 26, 1987 | November 25, 2002 (Funimation) October 14, 2004 (Blue Water) |
Son Gohan repeatedly slams Goku against the floor. Meanwhile, Emperor Pilaf is trying out his new power suit and Shu and Mai spy from a satellite on Goku. It turns out Pilaf has the final Dragon Ball and has jammed the Dragon Radar. After they soon discovered Goku's weak point is his tail, Pilaf, Shu and Mai sets off to Fortuneteller Baba's palace to squeeze Goku's tail for defeat and steal his last six Dragon Balls. Back at Fortuneteller Baba's palace, as Goku is still refusing to give up through the weakness of his tail, Son Gohan is about to slam Goku one more time to kill his own grandson much to the horror of Goku's friends. However, Goku's tail eventually rips off, just in the nick of time to avoid the final blow. Completely free from his weak point, but enraged at Son Gohan for pulling off his tail, Goku is about fight back. But Son Gohan surrenders and reveals his face to Goku and they reunite happily. Bulma retells her adventures with Goku. Son Gohan chooses to stay dead and vanishes after a farewell. Baba reveals the exact location of the last Dragon Ball.
| 77 | "Pilaf's Great Strategy"; Transliteration: "Pirafu no Daisakusen" (Japanese: ピラフの大作戦) | Kazuhisa Takenouchi | Toshiki Inoue | Yukio Ebisawa | September 2, 1987 | November 26, 2002 (Funimation) October 18, 2004 (Blue Water) |
| 77 | "Pilaf's Tactics" (Funimation)"Emperor Pilaf's Evil Plot" (Blue Water) | Kazuhisa Takenouchi | Toshiki Inoue | Yukio Ebisawa | September 2, 1987 | November 26, 2002 (Funimation) October 18, 2004 (Blue Water) |
Goku flies his Nimbus after Pilaf's car to get the last Dragon Ball. Emperor Pilaf is heading to Baba's place in the hope of procuring the other dragon balls, thinking that Goku still has a weakness. Goku stops the car and recognises his previous enemies. Pilaf challenges Goku to a battle, with his dragon ball against all six in Goku's possession. Pilaf, Shu and Mai get in their powersuits. The machines are unaffected by Goku's first attacks. The machines corner Goku and Shu burns his clothes off. To Pilaf's horror he finds Goku has no tail. Pilaf, Mai and Shu combine their powersuits into a titanic machine. Using a Kamehameha Wave, Goku blasts the side of Mai's powersuit. Mai ditches her broken powersuit and rides Pilaf's and Shu's combined powersuits as the trio flees. Shu fires a missile, but Goku throws it right back, trashing the powersuits. Pilaf gives Goku the Dragon Ball and Shu gives him his clothes.
| 78 | "Shen Long, Again"; Transliteration: "Shenron Futatabi" (Japanese: 神龍ふたたび) | Yoshihiro Ueda | Keiji Terui | Masayuki Uchiyama | September 9, 1987 | November 27, 2002 (Funimation) October 19, 2004 (Blue Water) |
| 78 | "The Eternal Dragon Rises" (Funimation)"The Mighty Shenron" (Blue Water) | Yoshihiro Ueda | Keiji Terui | Masayuki Uchiyama | September 9, 1987 | November 27, 2002 (Funimation) October 19, 2004 (Blue Water) |
Goku flies back to Baba's place and takes Upa with all the dragon balls to the Land of Korin. Yamcha wants to train with Roshi who doesn't feel up to it but Bulma changes his mind. Goku and Upa have fun on their journey. Goku summons the eternal dragon and with a pluck of his courage, Upa wishes his father be resurrected. The dragon grants the wish and Bora rises from his grave. Upa delightfully embraces his father and the dragon vanishes into the seven balls. Before they can scatter, Goku grabs the four-star ball, which is already turning into stone. Goku bids Bora and Upa farewell and heads back to Baba's place. Roshi says that he has nothing more to teach Goku. Master Roshi tells Goku that he will get more training by walking instead of riding on the Nimbus Cloud, so Goku starts his journey across the globe, while Yamcha and Krillin head off to Master Roshi's for another round of training.
| 79 | "Kinkaku and Ginkaku's Man-Eating Gourd"; Transliteration: "Kinkaku Ginkaku no Hito Kui Hyōtan" (Japanese: 金角・銀角の人食いひょうたん) | Kazuhisa Takenouchi | Keiji Terui | Mitsuo Shindō | September 16, 1987 | November 28, 2002 (Funimation) October 20, 2004 (Blue Water) |
| 79 | "Terror and Plague" (Funimation)"Goku's First New Adventure" (Blue Water) | Kazuhisa Takenouchi | Keiji Terui | Mitsuo Shindō | September 16, 1987 | November 28, 2002 (Funimation) October 20, 2004 (Blue Water) |
Goku is traveling when he sees a girl about to be eaten by a tiger-monster. He saves her and she asks him to help her village which is being terrorized by two men called Terror and Plague. When they reach the village, they see that there is a call going on in which when a person's name is called, and if they don't reply "here", they will be sent inside the gourd (a bottle used by Terror and Plague to trap people and dissolve them into a drinkable potion). Goku shows, challenges and beats them, but they use the gourd and trap him. Goku uses his power pole to prevent himself from completely falling into the bottle. One of the thugs decides to drink the new potion thinking Goku has been dissolved. Once Goku is freed, he surprises Terror and Plague and traps them into the gourd. Terror and Plague beg for mercy and as punishment for their tyranny they are put to work.
| 80 | "Imperial Match! Goku vs. Ten Long"; Transliteration: "Iza Gozen Shiai! Gokū tai Tenron" (Japanese: いざ御前試合!悟空VS天龍) | Yoshihiro Ueda | Toshiki Inoue | Taichiro Ohara | September 23, 1987 | November 29, 2002 (Funimation) October 21, 2004 (Blue Water) |
| 80 | "Goku vs. Sky Dragon" (Funimation)"Goku Fights Sky Dragon" (Blue Water) | Yoshihiro Ueda | Toshiki Inoue | Taichiro Ohara | September 23, 1987 | November 29, 2002 (Funimation) October 21, 2004 (Blue Water) |
Goku makes an enduring journey to challenge Master Chin. Chin is busy fending off Rising Dragon and his two men. Before Rising Dragon can begin a fight, his brother Sky Dragon stops him. Chin agrees to work out with Goku, his son Shoken getting worried. Goku finds Chin has been in weak health lately and learns from him about the King's Tournament. Goku manages to get medicine for Chin, managing to avoid conflict with the Dragon brothers. Sky Dragon spends his time terrifying his students. Goku volunteers to take Chin's place in the King's Tournament. Jealous Shoken spikes Goku's breakfast. At the tournament Goku is battling Sky Dragon as the laxative kicks in, but he resists the effect and beats Sky Dragon. The Dragon brothers and students join Chin for his teachings and Goku resumes his journey.
| 81 | "Goku Goes to the Demon World"; Transliteration: "Gokū Makai e Iku" (Japanese: 悟空・魔界へ行く) | Daisuke Nishio | Michiru Shimada & Kei Shussui | Yukio Ebisawa | September 30, 1987 | December 2, 2002 (Funimation) October 25, 2004 (Blue Water) |
| 81 | "Goku Goes to Demon Land" | Daisuke Nishio | Michiru Shimada & Kei Shussui | Yukio Ebisawa | September 30, 1987 | December 2, 2002 (Funimation) October 25, 2004 (Blue Water) |
In a castle, Princess Misa is taken by a demon. Goku reaches the village avoiding the traps. In the castle, the king has doubts Goku will succeed but recruits him to face the demon Shula, after seeing his fighting skills. At that moment, the demons are rampaging the village. The king escorts Goku to the portal the next day, and Goku cannot pull Shula's sword from the door. At the Kame House, Launch is getting agitated with Roshi, while Yamcha and Krillin are hard at training. Goku meets the guards Gola and Maylay, who advise caution fighting Shula, who intends to marry Princess Misa. Goku defeats the first demon and shocks everyone with his intention to fight Shula. Goku beats Shula and escapes with Misa, Maylay and Gola helping. Goku pulls out Shula's sword and seals the portal.
| 82 | "The Ferocious Beast, Inoshikacho"; Transliteration: "Abare Kaijū InoShikaChō" (Japanese: あばれ怪獣イノシカチョウ) | Minoru Okazaki | Shun'ichi Yukimuro | Minoru Maeda | October 7, 1987 | December 3, 2002 (Funimation) October 26, 2004 (Blue Water) |
| 82 | "The Rampage of InoShikaCho" (Funimation)"The Violent Monster Ino-Shika-Cho" (Blue Water) | Minoru Okazaki | Shun'ichi Yukimuro | Minoru Maeda | October 7, 1987 | December 3, 2002 (Funimation) October 26, 2004 (Blue Water) |
Goku finds some people running away from their village. They say that a monster named InoShikaCho is terrorizing their village. Goku goes to the village and finds two men, one of whom has a third eye, who defeated Inoshikacho. The villagers pay them 100,000 zeni for their services. Later, Goku finds them in the woods with InoShikaCho around a campfire. Goku realizes that they only pretended to kill the monster to get money. The three-eyed stranger fights Goku. He chops down a tree, which falls on Goku. A girl wakes him up, saying that she found him unconscious in the woods. Goku goes to the next village and finds the two strangers pulling the same trick. Goku says that they're friends with InoShikaCho, but they trick the villagers into believing Goku is friends with them. Goku picks up InoShikaCho and runs off, but the villagers catch him. The girl who saved him appears and clears Goku's name.
| 83 | "Hurry to the Tenkaichi Martial Arts Tournament, Goku!"; Transliteration: "Isoge Gokū! Tenka'ichi Budōkai" (Japanese: いそげ悟空!天下一武道会) | Toshihiko Arisako | Yasushi Hirano | Tomekichi Takeuchi | October 14, 1987 | December 4, 2002 (Funimation) October 27, 2004 (Blue Water) |
| 83 | "Which Way to Papaya Island?" (Funimation)"Hurry To The World Martial Arts Tournament, Goku!" (Blue Water) | Toshihiko Arisako | Yasushi Hirano | Tomekichi Takeuchi | October 14, 1987 | December 4, 2002 (Funimation) October 27, 2004 (Blue Water) |
Three years have passed, and it is the day before the World Martial Arts Tournament. Goku sees three guys beating someone up, so he steps in and fights. They run away, and the guy he saved, Konkichi, is very thankful. Konkichi takes Goku to the airport so he can fly to Papaya Island, the site of the tournament. Goku has no money, so they go to a carnival to win some. Goku wins enough money for the tickets, so they head back to the airport. Goku sees Fortuneteller Baba, so he stops to talk. Konkichi runs off, but is caught by the same guys as before. They force him to rob a bank, but he gets caught. Konkichi admits to Goku that he was a criminal, but he wants to change. Baba tells Goku where the three men are, so he takes off after them. He catches them and brings them to jail. Unfortunately, he missed his flight, so he decides to swim to Papaya Island.

=== Season 7: Tien Shinhan Saga (1987–88) ===
| No. | Japanese title Dub title(s) | Directed by | Written by | Animation directed by | Original release date | English air dates |
|---|---|---|---|---|---|---|
| 84 | "Aim to Be the World's Best Martial Artist!!"; Transliteration: "Mezase Budō Tenka'ichi!!" (Japanese: めざせ武道天下一!!) | Minoru Okazaki | Keiji Terui | Masayuki Uchiyama | October 21, 1987 | December 5, 2002 (Funimation) October 28, 2004 (Blue Water) |
| 84 | "Rivals and Arrivals" (Funimation)"Tournament Registration Day. Where's Goku?!" (Blue Water) | Minoru Okazaki | Keiji Terui | Masayuki Uchiyama | October 21, 1987 | December 5, 2002 (Funimation) October 28, 2004 (Blue Water) |
Krillin, Yamcha and the others arrive at Papaya Island and check-in. While they wait for Goku (who is having troubles of his own, even if they are minor for his standards) to arrive, the Crane Hermit and his two students, the same two who were swindling villages with Inoshikacho, turn up. Once they check-in, Master Roshi says that he and Master Shen, the Crane Hermit, used to be friends. Just as the registration period is about to end, Goku shows up. He and the others go out for a meal, and Master Roshi promises the restaurant owner he will pay him with the prize money from the tournament. That night, Krillin and Yamcha go out for a run and come across many of the other contestants training. The next morning, Goku, Krillin and Yamcha head towards the preliminary round arena. Master Roshi disappears, and Jackie Chun arrives.
| 85 | "Devoted to Victory!! Qualifier Survival"; Transliteration: "Kachinokoru zo!! Yosen Sabaibaru" (Japanese: 勝ちのこるぞっ!!予選サバイバル) | Daisuke Nishio; Storyboarded by : Satoru Kusuda | Toshiki Inoue | Masayuki Uchiyama | October 28, 1987 | December 6, 2002 (Funimation) November 1, 2004 (Blue Water) |
| 85 | "Preliminary Peril" (Funimation)"The Tournament Begins!" (Blue Water) | Daisuke Nishio; Storyboarded by : Satoru Kusuda | Toshiki Inoue | Masayuki Uchiyama | October 28, 1987 | December 6, 2002 (Funimation) November 1, 2004 (Blue Water) |
Goku, Krillin, Yamcha and Jackie Chun all get drawn into separate eighths of the bracket, so they won't meet each other until the finals. Yamcha easily defeats his first opponent. Krillin pretends to struggle with his opponent, but is easily victorious. Master Shen's two students, Tien Shinhan, who has three eyes, and Chiaotzu, approach Yamcha, Krillin and Goku to tell them how weak they are. Chiaotzu also calls Krillin a "midget". With tensions running high, Yamcha and Tien square off to fight, but Jackie Chun steps in and reminds them that fighting now would disqualify them. Later, Tien quickly wins his first match. The time has come for Goku's match, but unfortunately he is up against King Chappa. The last time King Chappa entered the tournament, he won without even getting hit.
| 86 | "It's Decided!! Eight Brave Men"; Transliteration: "Kettei!! Hachinin no Yūshatachi" (Japanese: 決定!!8人の勇者たち) | Kazuhisa Takenouchi | Keiji Terui | Yukio Ebisawa | November 4, 1987 | December 9, 2002 (Funimation) November 2, 2004 (Blue Water) |
| 86 | "Then There Were Eight" (Funimation)"The Fight to the Finals!" (Blue Water) | Kazuhisa Takenouchi | Keiji Terui | Yukio Ebisawa | November 4, 1987 | December 9, 2002 (Funimation) November 2, 2004 (Blue Water) |
From the start, it is clear that Goku is much faster and stronger than King Chappa. He jumps in the air, and on his way down, he blows at the ground to slow himself down and throw off King Chappa's timing. He then delivers the final blow. Jackie Chun then enters his fight, and although he is completely distracted with thoughts of Goku's new strength, he defeats his opponent in three blows. The preliminary rounds continue until the first intermission. During the meal, Yamcha and Tien nearly get in a fight, but once again, Jackie Chun stops them. Nam comes up to Goku to greet him. He is fighting in the tournament again, but this time it is only for fun, since his village is in no need of water anymore. Later, in the last match before the finals, Nam is nearly killed by Tien. Goku, Krillin, Yamcha and Jackie Chun all advance to the final round.
| 87 | "Showdown!! Yamcha vs. Tenshinhan"; Transliteration: "Taiketsu!! Yamucha tai Tenshinhan" (Japanese: 対決!!ヤムチャVS天津飯) | Yoshihiro Ueda | Shun'ichi Yukimuro | Masayuki Uchiyama | November 11, 1987 | December 10, 2002 (Funimation) November 3, 2004 (Blue Water) |
| 87 | "Yamcha vs. Tien" (Funimation)"Yamcha vs. Tien!" (Blue Water) | Yoshihiro Ueda | Shun'ichi Yukimuro | Masayuki Uchiyama | November 11, 1987 | December 10, 2002 (Funimation) November 3, 2004 (Blue Water) |
The finalists prepare to draw their numbers for the championship round. Chiaotzu uses his powers to rig the seeding. The first match is Yamcha against Tien, the second match is Jackie Chun against Man Wolf, the third is Krillin against Chiaotzu, and the fourth is Goku against Pomput. After a quick meal for Goku, the finals begin. Yamcha and Tien start fighting, and the two of them seem evenly matched. They each are surprised with the other's strength. During a lull in the action, Yamcha says that he is going to use his new technique: Wolf Fang Blowing Wind.
| 88 | "Onwards, Yamcha! The Incredible Tenshinhan"; Transliteration: "Yuke Yamucha! Osoru Beshi Tenshinhan" (Japanese: ゆけヤムチャ!恐るべし天津飯) | Daisuke Nishio | Toshiki Inoue | Mitsuo Shindō | November 18, 1987 | December 11, 2002 (Funimation) November 4, 2004 (Blue Water) |
| 88 | "Yamcha's Big Break" (Funimation)"Yamcha's Broken Dream" (Blue Water) | Daisuke Nishio | Toshiki Inoue | Mitsuo Shindō | November 18, 1987 | December 11, 2002 (Funimation) November 4, 2004 (Blue Water) |
Yamcha uses his Wolf Fang Blowing Wind technique, but it has no effect. He lands dozens of punches on Tien, but they too, don't seem to work. To everyone's surprise, Yamcha fires a Kamehameha Wave, but Tien deflects it back at him. Yamcha jumps up to avoid it, but Tien is there and kicks him to the ground. Tien comes down hard on Yamcha's leg, breaking it. Once Tien is declared the winner, Puar rushes in and transforms into a flying carpet to transport Yamcha to the hospital. Everyone heads back to the hotel to await tomorrow's match: Jackie Chun vs. Man Wolf.
| 89 | "Scary!! The Full Moon's Grudge"; Transliteration: "Kyōfu!! Mangetsu no Urami" (Japanese: 恐怖!!満月の恨み) | Minoru Okazaki | Michiru Shimada | Minoru Maeda | November 25, 1987 | December 12, 2002 (Funimation) November 8, 2004 (Blue Water) |
| 89 | "Full-Moon Vengeance" (Funimation)"Terror! The Grudge Of The Full Moon!" (Blue Water) | Minoru Okazaki | Michiru Shimada | Minoru Maeda | November 25, 1987 | December 12, 2002 (Funimation) November 8, 2004 (Blue Water) |
Man Wolf has been waiting three years for the opportunity to fight Jackie Chun. He is angry with Jackie because he destroyed the moon, preventing him from changing back into a human. Man Wolf tries to hit Jackie as hard as he can, but Jackie dodges with no effort. Man Wolf pulls a knife on Jackie Chun, thereby disqualifying himself, but Jackie easily stops Man Wolf from hurting him. He paralyzes Man Wolf with a special technique, then brings Krillin out into the ring. He hypnotizes Man Wolf into thinking that Krillin's bald, shiny head is the moon. Man Wolf changes back into a human. He thanks Jackie Chun and leaves the tournament.
| 90 | "Nanana!! What, a Dodon Wave?"; Transliteration: "Nanana!! Nanto Dodonpa" (Japanese: なななっ!!なんと どどん波) | Yoshihiro Ueda | Shun'ichi Yukimuro | Tomekichi Takeuchi | December 2, 1987 | December 13, 2002 (Funimation) November 9, 2004 (Blue Water) |
| 90 | "The Dodon Wave" (Funimation)"Wow! The Dodon Wave!" (Blue Water) | Yoshihiro Ueda | Shun'ichi Yukimuro | Tomekichi Takeuchi | December 2, 1987 | December 13, 2002 (Funimation) November 9, 2004 (Blue Water) |
Krillin and Chiaotzu begin to fight. Chiaotzu reveals that he has the ability to fly. Before Krillin can lay a hand on him, he floats up above the ring. He starts firing Dodon rays at Krillin, who is forced to run wildly around the ring to avoid them. Goku realizes that the Dodon ray is the same technique that was used by Mercenary Tao. Tien overhears Goku talking about the Dodon ray, so Goku tells him that Tao used it right before he killed him. Tien is shocked to hear this because Tao was one of the strongest men he ever knew. Jackie Chun tells Goku that Tao was Master Shen's brother. Tien tells Shen about Tao, causing Shen to become even angrier at Master Roshi's students. Meanwhile, Krillin tries to knock Chiaotzu out of the air, but fails. He decides to try the Kamehameha wave, even though he's never used it. Jackie Chun tries to tell Krillin that he's not ready to use it yet.
| 91 | "A Sudden Reversal!! Kuririn's Great Strategy"; Transliteration: "Gyakuten!! Kuririn no Paaden ne Daisakusen" (Japanese: 逆転!!クリリンの8でんネ大作戦) | Daisuke Nishio | Toshiki Inoue | Masayuki Uchiyama | December 9, 1987 | December 16, 2002 (Funimation) November 10, 2004 (Blue Water) |
| 91 | "Counting Controversy!!" (Funimation)"Krillin and Chiaotzu! Head to Head!" (Blue Water) | Daisuke Nishio | Toshiki Inoue | Masayuki Uchiyama | December 9, 1987 | December 16, 2002 (Funimation) November 10, 2004 (Blue Water) |
Chiaotzu fires his Dodon ray at Krillin, and it seems to destroy him. Suddenly, Krillin appears in the air behind Chiaotzu and fires a Kamehameha wave at him. Chiaotzu is only barely able to float above the ring now, so he tries another special attack. He jumps head-first towards Krillin in an attempt to push him out of the ring, but Krillin pushes him back. Chiaotzu then uses his special powers to paralyze Krillin. As Krillin is getting beaten up, he realizes Chiaotzu needs his hands to use his powers, so he gives him a math problem. Chiaotzu begins counting on his fingers, allowing Krillin to punch him out of the ring. Later that night, someone sneaks into Goku's room and tries to kill him. Goku wakes up, so the man flees. Goku and Krillin catch up to him and find that it was the Crane Hermit trying to avenge the death of Tao. They square off to fight, but Tien suddenly shows up and stops them. He says that Goku must be punished and humiliated in the ring, not in the street at night.
| 92 | "Hang on! Son Goku is here!!" Transliteration: "Omatase! Son Gokū Sanjō!!" (Japanese: おまたせーっ!孫悟空参上!!) | Kazuhisa Takenouchi | Keiji Terui | Yukio Ebisawa | December 16, 1987 | December 17, 2002 (Funimation) November 11, 2004 (Blue Water) |
| 92 | "Goku Enters the Ring" (Funimation)"The Strategy of the Movie Star's Manager!" (Blue Water) | Kazuhisa Takenouchi | Keiji Terui | Yukio Ebisawa | December 16, 1987 | December 17, 2002 (Funimation) November 11, 2004 (Blue Water) |
Goku and Master Roshi have a sparring session before the fourth match. Pomput's manager sees how strong Goku is and realizes Pomput can't beat him. Goku goes for a quick run and Pomput's manager follows in his car. He catches Goku and tells him that the fight has been moved. He offers to take Goku to the new arena. Launch, who is getting some ice cream, witnesses Goku getting in the car, so she chases after them. When she catches up to him, she easily defeats the manager's bodyguards. Goku runs back to the arena just in time for his fight. Pomput is a movie star and has never lost a fight, so he is very confident he can win. Once the fight starts, he tries to punch Goku, but Goku dodges it and gives Pomput three quick elbows to the gut, knocking him out.
| 93 | "Evenly Matched!! Tenshinhan vs. Jackie"; Transliteration: "Jitsuryoku Hakuchū!! Tenshinhan tai Jakkī" (Japanese: 実力伯仲!!天津飯VSジャッキー) | Daisuke Nishio | Takao Koyama & Naruhisa Arakawa | Masayuki Uchiyama | December 23, 1987 | December 18, 2002 (Funimation) November 15, 2004 (Blue Water) |
| 93 | "Tien Shinhan vs. Jackie Chun" (Funimation)"An Even Match!" (Blue Water) | Daisuke Nishio | Takao Koyama & Naruhisa Arakawa | Masayuki Uchiyama | December 23, 1987 | December 18, 2002 (Funimation) November 15, 2004 (Blue Water) |
Everyone waits for the first semifinal to start. Finally, Jackie Chun and Tien Shinhan begin their match. Tien attacks first, and Jackie Chun grabs him and throws him out of the ring. Tien reveals that he too, has the ability to fly, and floats back into the ring. Jackie Chun tries the mirror-image technique. He creates eight images of himself that rapidly rotate around Tien. They close in and attack from all sides. Tien uses his three eyes to figure out which is the real Jackie Chun, and give that one a harsh kick to the face. Jackie discards his shirt and powers up. The two of them begin attacking wildly. After a while, they fall apart from each other, badly beaten.
| 94 | "Gegege!! The New Crane Hermit School Technique: Taiyōken"; Transliteration: "Gegege!! Shintsurusenryū Taiyōken" (Japanese: ゲゲゲッ!!新鶴仙流・太陽拳) | Yoshihiro Ueda | Keiji Terui | Tomekichi Takeuchi | December 30, 1987 | December 19, 2002 (Funimation) November 16, 2004 (Blue Water) |
| 94 | "Stepping Down" (Funimation)"The Mysterious Young Tien" (Blue Water) | Yoshihiro Ueda | Keiji Terui | Tomekichi Takeuchi | December 30, 1987 | December 19, 2002 (Funimation) November 16, 2004 (Blue Water) |
Tien and Jackie Chun continue fighting. Tien kicks Jackie in the face, causing him to fly to the edge of the ring. Tien tries to push him out, but Jackie manages to get away and get back to the center of the ring. Tien decides to use his Solar Flare technique, which blinds everyone in the stadium, including Jackie. He delivers a powerful blow, nearly knocking Jackie out. The announcer begins to count, but before he reaches 10, Jackie gets up. Jackie then begins preaching to Tien, telling him the error of his ways. Tien ignores him and begins a furious attack. As Jackie continues preaching, Master Shen suddenly realizes Jackie Chun is really Master Roshi in disguise. He telepathically communicates this to Tien, who then fires a Kamehameha wave. Jackie Chun is able to deflect it upwards, and with some last words of wisdom, he inexplicably walks out of the ring.
| 95 | "Fight!! Goku vs. Kuririn"; Transliteration: "Faito!! Gokū tai Kuririn" (Japanese: ファイト!!悟空VSクリリン) | Kazuhisa Takenouchi | Michiru Shimada | Mitsuo Shindō | January 6, 1988 | December 20, 2002 (Funimation) November 17, 2004 (Blue Water) |
| 95 | "Goku vs. Krillin" (Funimation)"Brave Young Heroes" (Blue Water) | Kazuhisa Takenouchi | Michiru Shimada | Mitsuo Shindō | January 6, 1988 | December 20, 2002 (Funimation) November 17, 2004 (Blue Water) |
Goku and Krillin start their semifinal match. After several minutes of fighting, they seem evenly matched. Goku jumps high in the air, and Krillin follows him. The sun reflects off of Krillin's bald head and blinds Goku, allowing Krillin to kick him to the ground. Goku somehow lands on his feet and attacks Krillin as he falls. Krillin sucks in some air, causing him to float, thus throwing off Goku's timing. Meanwhile, Tien confronts Master Roshi to ask him why he quit the match. Master Roshi tells Tien that he is not a killer, even though he acts like it. He says that Tien has a conscience, and this will make him into a hero. Tien tries to ignore Roshi's teachings, and promises to kill Goku to prove him wrong.
| 96 | "Really, Goku?! Kuririn's Great Strategy"; Transliteration: "Masa ka Gokū!? Kuririn no Daisakusen" (Japanese: まさか悟空!?クリリンの大作戦) | Daisuke Nishio | Shun'ichi Yukimuro | Masayuki Uchiyama | January 13, 1988 | December 23, 2002 (Funimation) November 18, 2004 (Blue Water) |
| 96 | "Tail's Tale" (Funimation)"Disappearing Act" (Blue Water) | Daisuke Nishio | Shun'ichi Yukimuro | Masayuki Uchiyama | January 13, 1988 | December 23, 2002 (Funimation) November 18, 2004 (Blue Water) |
Goku and Krillin continue their fight. Goku runs toward Krillin, creating a Kamehameha wave as he goes. He jumps in the air and uses the wave to blast himself into Krillin. The announcer begins the count, but Krillin gets up, so they continue fighting. Goku gets several powerful hits in on Krillin, who realizes he only has one chance to win. He fires a Kamehameha wave at Goku, who easily blocks it. Suddenly, Krillin appears behind Goku and grabs his tail. Goku passes out and the announcer begins counting. Before he reaches 10, Goku gets up and slams Krillin to the ground, saying that during the last three years, he worked with his tail until the weakness was gone. Krillin fools Goku and gets in a cheap shot, causing the two of them to launch into another furious bout. After Krillin hits him again, Goku disappears. He is moving so fast that no one can see him. He suddenly appears next to Krillin and kicks him out of the ring.
| 97 | "The Finals!! The World's Greatest Martial Artist is...?!" Transliteration: "Kesshō!! Hatashite Budō Tenka'ichi wa!?" (Japanese: 決勝!!はたして武道天下一は!?) | Minoru Okazaki | Keiji Terui | Minoru Maeda | January 20, 1988 | December 25, 2002 (Funimation) November 22, 2004 (Blue Water) |
| 97 | "Final Match: Goku vs. Tien" (Funimation)"The Final Match! Who Will Be the World's Strongest?" (Blue Water) | Minoru Okazaki | Keiji Terui | Minoru Maeda | January 20, 1988 | December 25, 2002 (Funimation) November 22, 2004 (Blue Water) |
Yamcha sneaks out of the hospital to watch the final match, while Oolong and Puar transforms into giant monsters to save front-row seats for everyone. The match finally starts, and right away Goku attacks. He grabs Tien's leg with his tail and swings around to punch him in the face. Tien flies up in the air, and Goku jumps up after him. Tien hits Goku with a Dodon ray, blasting him down through the floor of the ring. Goku jumps up from the rubble and continues his assault. He tries his disappearing trick again, but Tien's three eyes help him to keep track of Goku's movements. While Goku is running around, Tien hits him, sending him flying to the wall of the ring. Tien pins Goku against the wall and beats him mercilessly.
| 98 | "The Secret Technique Haikyūken vs. Fighting Power"; Transliteration: "Higi Haikyūken tai Sentō Pawā" (Japanese: 秘技・排球拳VS戦闘パワー) | Yoshihiro Ueda | Yoshifumi Yuki | Taichiro Ohara | January 27, 1988 | December 26, 2002 (Funimation) November 23, 2004 (Blue Water) |
| 98 | "Victory's Edge" (Funimation)"Battle Power!" (Blue Water) | Yoshihiro Ueda | Yoshifumi Yuki | Taichiro Ohara | January 27, 1988 | December 26, 2002 (Funimation) November 23, 2004 (Blue Water) |
Tien grabs Goku and begins to play volleyball with him. He spikes Goku down into the ground, but to his surprise, Goku gets up. He says that throughout the tournament, he had only been using a fraction of his strength to protect his opponent, but now he is going to fight at full power. He unleashes a brutal assault on Tien, then starts conjuring a Kamehameha wave, but stops, realizing Tien would have dodged it. Tien meditates briefly, then they continue the match. Goku's next assault nearly pushes Tien out of the ring, but Tien is able to counter it. Goku then creates 10 images of himself to confuse Tien. When Tien attacks one of the false images, Goku sneaks up and knocks him down. Tien uses his Solar Flare technique, but Goku borrows Master Roshi's glasses and counters with his own attack. Goku jumps up for an attack, but is mysteriously frozen, allowing Tien to knock him down.
| 99 | "Tenshinhan in Distress!!"; Transliteration: "Tenshinhan no Kunō!!" (Japanese: 天津飯の苦悩!!) | Kazuhisa Takenouchi; Storyboarded by : Satoru Kusuda | Toshiki Inoue | Yukio Ebisawa | February 3, 1988 | December 27, 2002 (Funimation) November 24, 2004 (Blue Water) |
| 99 | "Tien's Insurrection" (Funimation)"Tien's Distress" (Blue Water) | Kazuhisa Takenouchi; Storyboarded by : Satoru Kusuda | Toshiki Inoue | Yukio Ebisawa | February 3, 1988 | December 27, 2002 (Funimation) November 24, 2004 (Blue Water) |
Goku once again gets frozen in midair, allowing Tien to kick him down to the ground. Goku uses a Kamehameha wave to prevent landing outside the ring. He attacks Tien, but is frozen again. Yamcha realizes Chiaotzu is using his powers to paralyze Goku. Tien hits Goku dozens of times, nearly knocking him out. Goku gets up and kicks Tien in the face, but is frozen once more. Tien once again pounds Goku mercilessly. Realizing that he's winning too easily, Tien figures out that Chiaotzu is helping him and forces him to stop, wanting to beat Goku in a fair fight. Seeing the error in Shen's teachings, Tien refuses to kill Goku. An angry Shen tells Chiaotzu to paralyze Tien and Goku to kill them, but he refuses. Shen tries to kill him, but Master Roshi hits him with a Kamehameha wave, blasting him out of the arena. Goku then attacks Tien with incredible force. Afterwards, Tien says that he let Goku beat him up to make up for the beating Goku took when he was paralyzed. Suddenly, Tien grows two extra arms out from his back.
| 100 | "Life?! Death?! A Last Resort"; Transliteration: "Sei ka Shi ka!? Saigo no Shudan" (Japanese: 生か死か!?最後の手段) | Mitsuo Hashimoto; Storyboarded by : Katsumi Aoshima | Keiji Terui | Katsumi Aoshima | February 10, 1988 | December 30, 2002 (Funimation) November 25, 2004 (Blue Water) |
| 100 | "The Spirit Cannon" (Funimation)"Tien's Final Tactic!" (Blue Water) | Mitsuo Hashimoto; Storyboarded by : Katsumi Aoshima | Keiji Terui | Katsumi Aoshima | February 10, 1988 | December 30, 2002 (Funimation) November 25, 2004 (Blue Water) |
With four arms, Tien clearly has an advantage over Goku. He nearly pushes him out of the ring, forcing Goku to jump up. Tien grabs Goku's arms and legs and repeatedly headbutts him. Goku begins to smack Tien in the face with his tail, forcing Tien to let him go. Goku then appears to grow six extra arms to counter Tien's four. The two of them continue fighting until they simultaneously knock each other down. The count reaches eight before they both stand up. Goku trips Tien and grabs his legs. He pulls on his legs, causing Tien tremendous pain. Tien's extra arms reach up and choke Goku, but Tien quickly give up. After a long struggle, Tien's legs flip Goku off of him and into the wall. Goku gets up, so Tien decides to use the Tri-Beam Cannon, a devastatingly powerful attack. Tien first tells Goku to dodge what is coming then Tien floats high above the ring and fires the Tri-Beam on Goku. When the dust clears, the entire ring is gone, leaving a gaping hole in the ground. Goku is nowhere to be found.
| 101 | "The Martial Arts Tournament Comes to an End! And Then...!!"; Transliteration: "Budōkai Shūryō! Soshite...!!" (Japanese: 武道会終了!そして...!!) | Daisuke Nishio | Michiru Shimada | Masayuki Uchiyama | February 17, 1988 | December 31, 2002 (Funimation) November 29, 2004 (Blue Water) |
| 101 | "The Fallen" (Funimation)"The Big Finale!" (Blue Water) | Daisuke Nishio | Michiru Shimada | Masayuki Uchiyama | February 17, 1988 | December 31, 2002 (Funimation) November 29, 2004 (Blue Water) |
Everyone looks up and finds Goku miles above the surface. Tien jumps up and tells Goku that he never meant to hit him with the Tri-Beam Cannon. He just wanted to knock him out of bounds, and since there's no stage to land on and since Tien can fly, Goku seems to have no chance. With a Kamehameha wave, Goku blasts himself into Tien. As they rapidly approach the surface, Goku is hit by a car, causing him to touch the ground slightly before Tien. The announcer declares Tien the winner, and the entire crowd rushes over to the landing site. Later, Tien offers Goku half of his prize money, but Goku declines the offer. Tien apologizes to Yamcha for breaking his leg, then takes everyone out to dinner. Right before they eat, Goku realizes he left the power pole and the four-star ball at the arena, so Krillin leaves to get them for him. While they're eating, Goku has a bad feeling something has happened to Krillin. He suddenly runs back to the arena and finds Krillin dead.

=== Season 8: King Piccolo Saga (1988) ===
| No. | Japanese title Dub title(s) | Directed by | Written by | Animation directed by | Original release date | English air dates |
|---|---|---|---|---|---|---|
| 102 | "The Terrifying Conspiracy of Kuririn's Death!!"; Transliteration: "Kuririn no Shi Osoroshiki Inbō!!" (Japanese: クリリンの死恐ろしき陰謀!!) | Kazuhisa Takenouchi | Keiji Terui | Tomekichi Takeuchi | February 24, 1988 | September 1, 2003 (Funimation) November 30, 2004 (Blue Water) |
| 102 | "Enter King Piccolo" (Funimation)"The Horrible Plot" (Blue Water) | Kazuhisa Takenouchi | Keiji Terui | Tomekichi Takeuchi | February 24, 1988 | September 1, 2003 (Funimation) November 30, 2004 (Blue Water) |
Goku and his friends find Krillin murdered. The referee says it was a monster that also took Goku's Dragon Ball and a list of tournament participants. Despite Roshi's protests, Goku takes the Dragon Radar and charges off in pursuit of the killer. Judging by a crest on a paper, Roshi knows this to be the work of King Piccolo. He explains how the world suffered his carnage long ago and how he and his master Mutaito trapped him in a jar at the cost of his own life. It turns out Emperor Pilaf released King Piccolo and is assisting him. Having learned from Pilaf about the origin of the dragon balls, Piccolo insists on using them to restore his youth while continuing his plan of world conquest. Meanwhile, Goku catches up with King Piccolo's minion Tambourine.
| 103 | "The Terror of Piccolo-Daimaō!"; Transliteration: "Pikkoro Daimaō no Kyōfu!!" (Japanese: ピッコロ大魔王の恐怖!!) | Yoshihiro Ueda | Toshiki Inoue | Mitsuo Shindō | March 2, 1988 | September 2, 2003 (Funimation) December 1, 2004 (Blue Water) |
| 103 | "Tambourine Attacks!" (Funimation)"The Terror of Piccolo" (Blue Water) | Yoshihiro Ueda | Toshiki Inoue | Mitsuo Shindō | March 2, 1988 | September 2, 2003 (Funimation) December 1, 2004 (Blue Water) |
Goku engages Tambourine in combat but is weak from hunger and Tambourine overpowers him and destroys the Flying Nimbus, leaving Goku for dead. Roshi and the others head to the Kame house. After Tambourine hands King Piccolo the dragon ball and list of fighters, he is sent to kill all the fighters, starting with King Chappa.
| 104 | "Come Back to Life, Son Goku!!"; Transliteration: "Yomigaere Son Gokū!!" (Japanese: よみがえれ孫悟空!!) | Minoru Okazaki | Keiji Terui | Minoru Maeda | March 9, 1988 | September 3, 2003 (Funimation) December 2, 2004 (Blue Water) |
| 104 | "Mark of the Demon" (Funimation)"Is Goku Alive?!" (Blue Water) | Minoru Okazaki | Keiji Terui | Minoru Maeda | March 9, 1988 | September 3, 2003 (Funimation) December 2, 2004 (Blue Water) |
While Tambourine kills fighter after fighter around the world (leaving the mark of the demon behind), King Piccolo creates and sends a new warrior called Cymbal to gather the remaining dragon balls. Goku wakes up and tries to look for food. Roshi plans to move from the island to somewhere else once Bulma makes another dragon radar. Goku finds a fish cooking and eats it. When he's finished, he vows for revenge. Suddenly, a mountain man emerges from the thickets mad that Goku ate his fish.
| 105 | "A Mysterious Man: Enter Yajirobe!!"; Transliteration: "Kaidanji Yajirobee Tōjō!!" (Japanese: 怪男児・ヤジロベー登場!!) | Yoshihiro Ueda; Storyboarded by : Satoru Kusuda | Michiru Shimada | Masayuki Uchiyama | March 16, 1988 | September 4, 2003 (Funimation) December 6, 2004 (Blue Water) |
| 105 | "Here Comes Yajirobe" (Funimation)"Watch Out For Yajirobe" (Blue Water) | Yoshihiro Ueda; Storyboarded by : Satoru Kusuda | Michiru Shimada | Masayuki Uchiyama | March 16, 1988 | September 4, 2003 (Funimation) December 6, 2004 (Blue Water) |
Goku fights with Yajirobe, who proves to be a skilled and tough fighter. Roshi finds a safe haven for his friends and sets out with Tien and Chiaotzu to find the dragon balls and stop King Piccolo. Bulma preserves Krillin in a freezing capsule. Goku accuses Yajirobe of assisting Tambourine but eventually learns that Yajirobe is not lying and never steals. Cymbal appears eyeing Yajirobe's dragon ball. After a game of rock, paper, scissors, Yajirobe fights Cymbal, culminating in Yajirobe killing the monster by slicing him in half. At that moment, King Piccolo feels the presence of Cymbal's death.
| 106 | "Demon Beast Tambourine is Coming!!"; Transliteration: "Majū Tanbarin ga Yatte Kuru!!" (Japanese: 魔獣・タンバリンがやってくる!!) | Kazuhisa Takenouchi; Storyboarded by : Yukio Ebisawa | Toshiki Inoue | Yukio Ebisawa | March 23, 1988 | September 5, 2003 (Funimation) December 7, 2004 (Blue Water) |
| 106 | "Terrible Tambourine" (Funimation)"Tambourine Gets Busy" (Blue Water) | Kazuhisa Takenouchi; Storyboarded by : Yukio Ebisawa | Toshiki Inoue | Yukio Ebisawa | March 23, 1988 | September 5, 2003 (Funimation) December 7, 2004 (Blue Water) |
King Piccolo is furious about Cymbal's death. Tambourine next targets Giran, and goes after the next name on his list: Yamcha. Goku requests Yajirobe's dragon ball, explaining their powers to him. Tambourine finds Yamcha but before he can kill him, King Piccolo telepathically orders him to find Cymbal's killer. Master Roshi procures one of the dragon balls. Goku declares his intention to use the Dragon Balls to resurrect Krillin.
| 107 | "Son Goku: Explosive Rage!!"; Transliteration: "Son Gokū Ikari Bakuhatsu!!" (Japanese: 孫悟空・怒り爆発!!) | Daisuke Nishio | Keiji Terui | Katsumi Aoshima | April 6, 1988 | September 9, 2003 (Funimation) December 8, 2004 (Blue Water) |
| 107 | "Tien's Atonement" (Funimation)"Goku Returns For Revenge" (Blue Water) | Daisuke Nishio | Keiji Terui | Katsumi Aoshima | April 6, 1988 | September 9, 2003 (Funimation) December 8, 2004 (Blue Water) |
Master Roshi drives a hard bargain with pirates on a land battleship to get another Dragon Ball. Yajirobe refuses to hand his dragon ball to Goku, who won't leave Yajirobe until Tambourine finds them. They both stop at a river, exhausted from their long run. During their search for another dragon ball in a town, Tien comes across an old rival he previously broke a leg in a fight. Tien tries to ask nicely for the dragon ball, but the man refuses. Several soldiers storm the house thinking Tien is the killer of the martial arts fighters, but Master Roshi convinces them they're mistaken. The man forgives Tien and offers to give the dragon ball. Tambourine finds Yajirobe and Goku catches up, ready to take his revenge.
| 108 | "Piccolo-Daimaō Descends!!"; Transliteration: "Pikkoro Daimaō Oritatsu!!" (Japanese: ピッコロ大魔王降り立つ!!) | Yoshihiro Ueda | Shun'ichi Yukimuro | Tomekichi Takeuchi | April 13, 1988 | September 10, 2003 (Funimation) December 9, 2004 (Blue Water) |
| 108 | "Goku's Revenge" (Funimation)"Here Comes Piccolo!" (Blue Water) | Yoshihiro Ueda | Shun'ichi Yukimuro | Tomekichi Takeuchi | April 13, 1988 | September 10, 2003 (Funimation) December 9, 2004 (Blue Water) |
As Roshi follows a dragon ball in motion, Goku begins his fight with Tambourine, immediately overwhelming him. Tambourine fires an incinerating beam at Goku, but he evades it and kills him with a Kamehameha Wave in midair. Sensing Tambourine's death, King Piccolo decides to deal with Goku himself. Roshi and Tien find a fourth dragon ball in a cave, tangled with crows. King Piccolo decides to wait for all the other Dragon Balls to be gathered as he gets closer to Goku's location.
| 109 | "Son Goku vs. Piccolo-Daimaō"; Transliteration: "Son Gokū tai Pikkoro Daimaō" (Japanese: 孫悟空対ピッコロ大魔王) | Kazuhisa Takenouchi | Miho Maruo | Masayuki Uchiyama | April 20, 1988 | September 11, 2003 (Funimation) December 13, 2004 (Blue Water) |
| 109 | "Goku vs. King Piccolo" (Funimation)"Goku vs. Piccolo" (Blue Water) | Kazuhisa Takenouchi | Miho Maruo | Masayuki Uchiyama | April 20, 1988 | September 11, 2003 (Funimation) December 13, 2004 (Blue Water) |
Roshi is on the verge of getting the fifth dragon ball. Pilaf's ship lands near Goku and Yajirobe. Recalling King Piccolo, Yajirobe hands Goku the dragon ball and hides. King Piccolo jumps down to face Goku. Goku uses his speed to land a few hits on King Piccolo, but it is not enough against King Piccolo's counterattack. King Piccolo stuns Goku. Roshi procures the fifth Dragon Ball, but drops it down a canyon. After a long fight, King Piccolo fires several explosive beams at Goku. When Goku's Kamehameha fails, King Piccolo prepares to finish him off.
| 110 | "Keep at it! Son Goku!!"; Transliteration: "Ganbare! Son Gokū!!" (Japanese: がんばれっ!孫悟空!!) | Daisuke Nishio; Storyboarded by : Satoru Kusuda | Michiru Shimada | Mitsuo Shindō | May 4, 1988 | September 15, 2003 (Funimation) December 14, 2004 (Blue Water) |
| 110 | "Piccolo Closes In" (Funimation)"Goku's Last Chance" (Blue Water) | Daisuke Nishio; Storyboarded by : Satoru Kusuda | Michiru Shimada | Mitsuo Shindō | May 4, 1988 | September 15, 2003 (Funimation) December 14, 2004 (Blue Water) |
After a few more hits, King Piccolo critically wounds Goku with one of his most powerful beams and takes his Dragon Ball. King Piccolo makes his way to get the rest of the Dragon Balls. In his state, Goku requests that Yajirobe take him to Korin Tower. Meanwhile, Chiaotzu finds the fifth dragon ball. Roshi decides to head to King Piccolo to get the other two balls. Roshi takes to the ground and hides the dragon balls he collected. King Piccolo swallows his two dragon balls thwarting Roshi's plan. To prevent Tien from fighting, Roshi paralyses him. King Piccolo jumps down to face Roshi.
| 111 | "The Turtle Hermit's Last Mafūba"; Transliteration: "Kame-Sennin no Saigo no Mafūba!!" (Japanese: 亀仙人の最後の魔封波!!) | Daisuke Nishio | Keiji Terui | Masayuki Uchiyama | May 11, 1988 | September 16, 2003 (Funimation) December 15, 2004 (Blue Water) |
| 111 | "Roshi's Gambit" (Funimation)"The Mighty Mafuba Wave" (Blue Water) | Daisuke Nishio | Keiji Terui | Masayuki Uchiyama | May 11, 1988 | September 16, 2003 (Funimation) December 15, 2004 (Blue Water) |
Roshi tells King Piccolo where his dragon balls are, but knowing full well that he is no match for King Piccolo, has no wish to fight, and toys with King Piccolo, enduring the pain he receives. King Piccolo doesn't recall meeting Roshi before, until Roshi mentions Mutaito, and grows fearful as he realizes what Roshi is here to do. Roshi takes a special jar out a capsule and unleashes an evil containment wave, King Piccolo attempting to resist. Unfortunately, Roshi finally misses at the last second and dies. King Piccolo unites all seven balls and summons the Eternal Dragon Shenron.
| 112 | "Newfound Youth?! Piccolo-Daimaō"; Transliteration: "Wakagaeru ka!? Pikkoro Daimaō" (Japanese: 若がえるか!?ピッコロ大魔王) | Minoru Okazaki | Toshiki Inoue | Minoru Maeda | May 18, 1988 | September 17, 2003 (Funimation) December 16, 2004 (Blue Water) |
| 112 | "King Piccolo's Wish" (Funimation)"Will Piccolo Regain His Youth?" (Blue Water) | Minoru Okazaki | Toshiki Inoue | Minoru Maeda | May 18, 1988 | September 17, 2003 (Funimation) December 16, 2004 (Blue Water) |
Chiaotzu tries to thwart King Piccolo's wish, but is killed instead. King Piccolo makes his wish and becomes younger. Before Shenron can disperse, King Piccolo kills him so that nobody else can use the Dragon Balls against him. King Piccolo intends to target the Kingdom of Chow. There, King Furry is a kindhearted person. Tien intends to use the evil containment wave on King Piccolo. Pilaf tries to reclaim his reward but King Piccolo betrays him and dumps him off the ship. Yajirobe and Goku finally reach Korin's tower.
| 113 | "King Castle, on Offense and Defense!!"; Transliteration: "Kingu Kyassuru no Kōbō!!" (Japanese: キングキャッスルの攻防!!) | Kazuhisa Takenouchi | Michiru Shimada | Yukio Ebisawa | May 25, 1988 | September 18, 2003 (Funimation) December 27, 2004 (Blue Water) |
| 113 | "Siege on Chow Castle" (Funimation)"Taking The King's Castle" (Blue Water) | Kazuhisa Takenouchi | Michiru Shimada | Yukio Ebisawa | May 25, 1988 | September 18, 2003 (Funimation) December 27, 2004 (Blue Water) |
As King Piccolo prepares to attack Chow Castle, everyone is celebrating King Furry's anniversary including Snow. Goku intends to climb Korin's tower to meet Korin once more. With Bora's help, Yajirobe begins his climb up the tower. Yamcha and the others arrive, where Tien is waiting. As girls hand King Furry bouquets, King Piccolo storms the castle. Things get ugly in the kingdom, even for King Furry. King Piccolo kills the commander and captures the evacuating king. Yajirobe finally reaches near the tower summit with Goku.
| 114 | "Goku's Wish!! Even Karin-sama is worried" Transliteration: "Gokū no Negai!! Karin-sama mo Nayamu" (Japanese: 悟空のねがい!!カリン様もなやむ) | Yoshihiro Ueda | Shun'ichi Yukimuro | Mitsuo Shindō | June 1, 1988 | September 22, 2003 (Funimation) December 28, 2004 (Blue Water) |
| 114 | "Conquest and Power" (Funimation)"Goku Gets Some Bad News" (Blue Water) | Yoshihiro Ueda | Shun'ichi Yukimuro | Mitsuo Shindō | June 1, 1988 | September 22, 2003 (Funimation) December 28, 2004 (Blue Water) |
King Piccolo kills King Furry's first officer and demands Furry send word to the world of his conquest. Furry refuses and King Piccolo destroys a large part of the city making him give in. Bulma places Chiaotzu and Roshi's corpses in freezing capsules. Meanwhile, Yajirobe meets Korin and eats too many Sensu Beans. Goku's friends are trying to enjoy themselves while Tien is trying hard to learn the evil containment wave. Sadly Korin has nothing left to teach Goku, but tips Goku on Ultra Divine Water.
| 115 | "Go Get It! The Mysterious Super God Water"; Transliteration: "Te ni Irero! Nazo no Chōshinsui" (Japanese: 手に入れろ!謎の超神水) | Daisuke Nishio; Storyboarded by : Satoru Kusuda | Michiru Shimada | Masayuki Uchiyama | June 8, 1988 | September 23, 2003 (Funimation) December 29, 2004 (Blue Water) |
| 115 | "Awaken Darkness" (Funimation)"The Mysterious Choushin Sui Water" (Blue Water) | Daisuke Nishio; Storyboarded by : Satoru Kusuda | Michiru Shimada | Masayuki Uchiyama | June 8, 1988 | September 23, 2003 (Funimation) December 29, 2004 (Blue Water) |
Piano antagonizes King Piccolo's enslaved subjects. Korin tells Goku that the Ultra Divine Water is hidden deep in an icy labyrinth where many have perished trying to pass. Yajirobe refuses to go, but accidentally goes in the same portal that Goku enters after. As Goku fights an indestructible ice monster, Darkness awakens. Yajirobe and Goku escape sliding down a long twisty path. Snow is very tempted to shoot King Piccolo with a rifle, but knows how unwise it is. Darkness has something bad in store for Goku and Yajirobe.
| 116 | "The Turtle Hermit Lives?!"; Transliteration: "Ikite Ita Kame-sen'nin!?" (Japanese: 生きていた亀仙人!?) | Daisuke Nishio | Michiru Shimada | Tomekichi Takeuchi | June 22, 1988 | September 24, 2003 (Funimation) December 30, 2004 (Blue Water) |
| 116 | "A Taste of Destiny" (Funimation)"Is Master Roshi Alive?" (Blue Water) | Daisuke Nishio | Michiru Shimada | Tomekichi Takeuchi | June 22, 1988 | September 24, 2003 (Funimation) December 30, 2004 (Blue Water) |
As Yajirobe and Goku press on, they go their separate ways. Goku meets Master Roshi and is taken to the Kame House in the middle of the labyrinth where all his friends await him. Goku sees all this is an illusion to bait him into danger and this Roshi is a fraud. Yajirobe falls onto Goku and they both fall off a cliff clinging for their lives. With effort, Goku stays put, even as Roshi injures him. Satisfied, Darkness meets with Goku and warns him the possibility of death from drinking the water if he is not fit for it. Goku takes the risk and drinks the water. Meanwhile, King Piccolo broadcasts that criminals are free to reign in the world.
| 117 | "Son Goku Finally Departs!!"; Transliteration: "Son Gokū Tsui ni Hasshin!!" (Japanese: 孫悟空ついに発進!!) | Mitsuo Hashimoto; Storyboarded by : Katsumi Aoshima | Keiji Terui | Katsumi Aoshima | June 29, 1988 | September 25, 2003 (Funimation) January 3, 2005 (Blue Water) |
| 117 | "The Ultimate Sacrifice" (Funimation)"Goku Gets a Boost" (Blue Water) | Mitsuo Hashimoto; Storyboarded by : Katsumi Aoshima | Keiji Terui | Katsumi Aoshima | June 29, 1988 | September 25, 2003 (Funimation) January 3, 2005 (Blue Water) |
Goku has survived the Ultra Divine Water and vaults his and Yajirobe's way out with the Power Pole. Meanwhile, a crime wave spreads throughout the world. Eighter has traveled to Chow Kingdom to find Snow. Snow is making herself useful helping those in casualty as Eighter finds her. Eighter forcefully persuades a band of rogues to aid the casualties. Tien finally masters the evil containment wave and makes his way to confront King Piccolo. Goku and Yajirobe manage to get back to Korin's Tower. Korin gives Goku a new Nimbus Cloud and Goku makes his way to face King Piccolo once and for all.
| 118 | "Tenshinhan's Determination"; Transliteration: "Tenshinhan no Ketsui!!" (Japanese: 天津飯の決意!!) | Yoshihiro Ueda | Toshiki Inoue | Masayuki Uchiyama | July 6, 1988 | September 29, 2003 (Funimation) January 4, 2005 (Blue Water) |
| 118 | "Prelude to Vengeance" (Funimation)"The Determination of Tien" (Blue Water) | Yoshihiro Ueda | Toshiki Inoue | Masayuki Uchiyama | July 6, 1988 | September 29, 2003 (Funimation) January 4, 2005 (Blue Water) |
King Piccolo keeps the world at suspense as he chooses a target sector to annihilate, eventually selecting Sector 28, which is none other than Bulma's homeland. The entire city goes scares and tries to evacuate in a frenzy, including Bulma's parents. A team of convicts storms the Kame House, but Yamcha and Launch beat them. Tien arrives at Chow Castle just as King Piccolo is about to depart. Before Tien can start his plan, King Piccolo creates a new warrior called Drum.
| 119 | "Will it Work?! The Legendary Mafūba"; Transliteration: "Kimaru ka!? Densetsu no Mafūba" (Japanese: きまるか!?伝説の魔封波) | Minoru Okazaki | Keiji Terui | Minoru Maeda | July 20, 1988 | September 30, 2003 (Funimation) January 5, 2005 (Blue Water) |
| 119 | "Battle Cry" (Funimation)"Testing the Mafuba Wave" (Blue Water) | Minoru Okazaki | Keiji Terui | Minoru Maeda | July 20, 1988 | September 30, 2003 (Funimation) January 5, 2005 (Blue Water) |
As crises continue in West City, Tien is forced to fight Drum. Goku stops halfway on his journey to help save the Ox King and Chi-Chi from soldiers blackmailed into killing martial artists by King Piccolo, Chi-Chi reunites with Goku and begs him to defeat King Piccolo. Tired of waiting, Yamcha and the others decide to go after Tien. After taking blows Tien seizes his chance to perform the evil containment wave, but King Piccolo destroys the jar. Goku arrives and kicks Drum hard, killing him.
| 120 | "Goku: Rage at Full Power!!"; Transliteration: "Gokū · Ikari no Furu Pawā!!" (Japanese: 悟空・怒りのフルパワー!!) | Mitsuo Hashimoto; Storyboarded by : Yukio Ebisawa | Keiji Terui | Masayuki Uchiyama | July 27, 1988 | October 1, 2003 (Funimation) January 6, 2005 (Blue Water) |
| 120 | "Goku Strikes Back" (Funimation)"Goku's Fierce New Power Unleashed!" (Blue Water) | Mitsuo Hashimoto; Storyboarded by : Yukio Ebisawa | Keiji Terui | Masayuki Uchiyama | July 27, 1988 | October 1, 2003 (Funimation) January 6, 2005 (Blue Water) |
Goku starts his fight by throwing King Piccolo through Chow Castle. King Piccolo's first attacks fail to harm Goku. King Piccolo gets many blows from Goku, so he harnesses his full power, killing Piano in the process. Goku takes a powerful hit and King Piccolo rounds on Tien. Goku suddenly leaps out about to launch a Kamehameha Wave.
| 121 | "Son Goku's Greatest Crisis"; Transliteration: "Son Gokū Saidai no Kiki!!" (Japanese: 孫悟空最大の危機!!) | Yoshihiro Ueda | Keiji Terui | Mitsuo Shindō | August 3, 1988 | October 2, 2003 (Funimation) January 10, 2005 (Blue Water) |
| 121 | "The Biggest Crisis" (Funimation)"The Biggest Crisis!" (Blue Water) | Yoshihiro Ueda | Keiji Terui | Mitsuo Shindō | August 3, 1988 | October 2, 2003 (Funimation) January 10, 2005 (Blue Water) |
Goku blasts King Piccolo in the back with a Kamehameha Wave and continues to devastate King Piccolo. News of the fight reaches everywhere. King Piccolo manages to wound Goku's right knee, forcing Goku to use his power pole to strike back. King Piccolo fires deadly beams until Goku loses his power pole and hits him, destroying the entire kingdom, with King Furry evading death. Tien is able to save Goku from certain death but is exhausted from the effort. Goku prevents King Piccolo from conjuring another explosive wave, but King Piccolo manages to hit Goku and create a huge crater. Goku gets out with his Nimbus Cloud.
| 122 | "The Final Gamble"; Transliteration: "Saigo no Kake!!" (Japanese: 最後の賭け!!) | Minoru Okazaki | Hajime Satsuki | Tomekichi Takeuchi | August 10, 1988 | October 6, 2003 (Funimation) January 11, 2005 (Blue Water) |
| 122 | "Final Showdown" (Funimation)"Goku Dethrones the King!" (Blue Water) | Minoru Okazaki | Hajime Satsuki | Tomekichi Takeuchi | August 10, 1988 | October 6, 2003 (Funimation) January 11, 2005 (Blue Water) |
Sensing he is fighting a losing battle, King Piccolo resorts to a cowardly act, threatening to kill Tien if Goku moves a muscle. Yamcha reaches the place and lands his plane. Yajirobe has also arrived to watch Goku fight. Upon discovering that King Piccolo killed Shenron, Goku resigns himself to enduring repetitive pains getting his limbs crippled. With Goku incapacitated, King Piccolo prepares to finish him off, but Goku uses full power in his right fist into Great Ape Fist to punch a hole through King Piccolo's torso. Seconds before King Piccolo's death, he uses the last of his energy to create his final offspring and vows his son to avenge his death. Yajirobe saves Goku from falling to his death and retrieves Tien.

=== Season 9: Piccolo Jr. Saga (1988–89) ===
| No. | Japanese title Dub title(s) | Directed by | Written by | Animation directed by | Original release date | English air dates |
|---|---|---|---|---|---|---|
| 123 | "The Nyoibō's Secret"; Transliteration: "Nyoibō no Himitsu" (Japanese: 如意棒の秘密) | Yoshihiro Ueda; Storyboarded by : Osamu Kasai | Keiji Terui | Masayuki Uchiyama | August 17, 1988 | October 7, 2003 (Funimation) January 12, 2005 (Blue Water) |
| 123 | "Lost and Found" (Funimation)"The Search for the Magic Stick" (Blue Water) | Yoshihiro Ueda; Storyboarded by : Osamu Kasai | Keiji Terui | Masayuki Uchiyama | August 17, 1988 | October 7, 2003 (Funimation) January 12, 2005 (Blue Water) |
Tien retrieves Goku's power pole as Bulma, Yamcha and sweet Launch scan the place. Yajirobe takes Goku back to Korin's tower. News of King Piccolo's defeat spreads with much celebration and Chi-Chi secretly believes that Goku defeated him. Even as the Eternal Dragon is dead, Bulma procured all the stones anyway. An old lady spots King Piccolo's egg and she and her husband bring to their house and Piccolo Jr. is about to hatch. Korin is shocked to hear that the Eternal Dragon is dead. Korin knows the creator of the Dragon Balls, Kami. To get to him Goku searches for the Power Pole while meeting King Furry. Fortuneteller Baba tells Goku the power pole is at Master Roshi's house. Goku gets the Power Pole and flies back to Korin's tower. Piccolo Jr. destroys the couple's house and vows revenge for his father's death.
| 124 | "Temple Above the Clouds"; Transliteration: "Kumo no Ue no Shinden" (Japanese: 雲の上の神殿) | Mitsuo Hashimoto; Storyboarded by : Yutaka Satō | Toshiki Inoue | Yukio Ebisawa | August 24, 1988 | October 8, 2003 (Funimation) January 13, 2005 (Blue Water) |
| 124 | "Temple Above the Clouds" (Funimation)"The Palace Above the Clouds" (Blue Water) | Mitsuo Hashimoto; Storyboarded by : Yutaka Satō | Toshiki Inoue | Yukio Ebisawa | August 24, 1988 | October 8, 2003 (Funimation) January 13, 2005 (Blue Water) |
Goku extends the Power Pole from the top of Korin's Tower to reach the temple above. Once there he must battle Mr. Popo in order to obtain an audience with Kami. The placid Mr. Popo proves to be a lot stronger than he appears. Meanwhile, back on the ground, Kame House gets flooded with reporters looking for Goku after it is discovered that he is the one who defeated King Piccolo.
| 125 | "Kami-sama Appears!!"; Transliteration: "Kami-sama Tōjō!!" (Japanese: 神様登場!!) | Minoru Okazaki | Yoshiyuki Suga | Minoru Maeda | August 31, 1988 | October 9, 2003 (Funimation) January 17, 2005 (Blue Water) |
| 125 | "Earth's Guardian Emerges" (Funimation)"Lord Kami Reveals Himself" (Blue Water) | Minoru Okazaki | Yoshiyuki Suga | Minoru Maeda | August 31, 1988 | October 9, 2003 (Funimation) January 17, 2005 (Blue Water) |
Mr. Popo finally agrees to train Goku after seeing his potential. At the same time, Tien vows to train hard to beat Goku in the next Martial Arts Tournament. Realizing Goku's determination, Kami reveals himself to Goku, who is shocked by his appearance and the story he tells. Kami agrees to revive the Eternal Dragon if Goku will stay and train with Mr. Popo for three years, terms which Goku gladly accepts.
| 126 | "Shen Long is Resurrected!!"; Transliteration: "Yomigaeru Shenron!!" (Japanese: よみがえる神龍!!) | Yoshihiro Ueda | Keiji Terui | Katsumi Aoshima | September 14, 1988 | October 13, 2003 (Funimation) January 18, 2005 (Blue Water) |
| 126 | "Eternal Dragon Resurrected" (Funimation)"Shenron Resurrected" (Blue Water) | Yoshihiro Ueda | Keiji Terui | Katsumi Aoshima | September 14, 1988 | October 13, 2003 (Funimation) January 18, 2005 (Blue Water) |
Kami revives Shenron, the Eternal Dragon. When Goku's friends down on Earth call Shenron, he tells them that Goku is training in Heaven under Kami and will meet them at the next Martial Arts Tournament. They wish for everyone who was killed by King Piccolo to be revived. The news that Goku is training under Kami spurs Tien, Yamcha, and Krillin to train hard as well for the competition.
| 127 | "Faster than Lightning!!"; Transliteration: "Kaminari yori mo Hayaku!!" (Japanese: カミナリよりも速く!!) | Yoshihiro Ueda; Storyboarded by : Osamu Kasai | Yoshiyuki Suga | Masayuki Uchiyama | September 21, 1988 | October 14, 2003 (Funimation) January 19, 2005 (Blue Water) |
| 127 | "Quicker than Lightning" (Funimation)"Move Faster Than Lightning, Goku!" (Blue Water) | Yoshihiro Ueda; Storyboarded by : Osamu Kasai | Yoshiyuki Suga | Masayuki Uchiyama | September 21, 1988 | October 14, 2003 (Funimation) January 19, 2005 (Blue Water) |
Tien, Krillin, and Yamcha continue to train at Kame House. Simultaneously, Kami and Mr. Popo send Goku on a special training mission to fetch a crown. As Goku tries to take the crown from the top of a mountain, he is struck by lightning. Goku meets a young girl who uses her "sixth sense" to find her lost bird. This makes Goku realize how he must acquire the crown: he must develop a "sixth sense" to anticipate and be faster than the lightning.
| 128 | "Quiet as the Sky"; Transliteration: "Sora no yō ni Shizuka ni" (Japanese: 空のように静かに) | Mitsuo Hashimoto; Storyboarded by : Satoru Kusuda | Keiji Terui | Mitsuo Shindō | September 28, 1988 | October 15, 2003 (Funimation) January 20, 2005 (Blue Water) |
| 128 | "Secret of the Woods" (Funimation)"Goku Fights a Giant" (Blue Water) | Mitsuo Hashimoto; Storyboarded by : Satoru Kusuda | Keiji Terui | Mitsuo Shindō | September 28, 1988 | October 15, 2003 (Funimation) January 20, 2005 (Blue Water) |
Tien, Krillin, and Yamcha ask Master Roshi why he is not teaching them anymore and he explains to them that he has nothing more to teach and that they should seek training on their own. Mr. Popo sends Goku to a forest in search of someone who can train his mind. Goku meets a large family that lives in a cabin and the grandfather of the family, a simple fisherman, turns out to be able to teach Goku more than he expected.
| 129 | "Time Traveler Goku"; Transliteration: "Toki o Kakeru Gokū" (Japanese: 時をかける悟空) | Yoshihiro Ueda | Toshiki Inoue | Tomekichi Takeuchi | October 12, 1988 | October 16, 2003 (Funimation) January 24, 2005 (Blue Water) |
| 129 | "The Time Room" (Funimation)"Goku Travels Back in Time" (Blue Water) | Yoshihiro Ueda | Toshiki Inoue | Tomekichi Takeuchi | October 12, 1988 | October 16, 2003 (Funimation) January 24, 2005 (Blue Water) |
Mr. Popo sends Goku back in time to train more. In the past he meets the young Master Roshi and his rival, the young Crane Hermit. Goku learns from their master Mutaito how to harness his spirit energy. During an incident where the Crane Hermit steals Roshi's love interest, Goku gets angry and manages to use his spirit energy successfully. Back in the present, Tien contemplates visiting Korin's Tower in order to train as Goku once had.
| 130 | "Goku's Opponent is... Goku?!"; Transliteration: "Gokū no Teki wa...Gokū!?" (Japanese: 悟空の敵は...悟空!?) | Mitsuo Hashimoto; Storyboarded by : Daisuke Nishio | Hajime Satsuki | Masayuki Uchiyama | October 19, 1988 | October 20, 2003 (Funimation) January 25, 2005 (Blue Water) |
| 130 | "Goku's Doll" (Funimation)"Goku vs. Goku!" (Blue Water) | Mitsuo Hashimoto; Storyboarded by : Daisuke Nishio | Hajime Satsuki | Masayuki Uchiyama | October 19, 1988 | October 20, 2003 (Funimation) January 25, 2005 (Blue Water) |
Tien, Krillin, Yamcha, and Chiaotzu all are heading toward's Korin's Tower, and are training on the way. Mr. Popo finally gives Goku an opponent to train with, and it turns out to be a clay version of Goku. Their skills are exactly the same, the only difference is that the clay Goku has no interference in his mind, and can concentrate completely on fighting. This shows Goku that he needs to quiet his mind, and he begins to realize how to achieve that.
| 131 | "Each on Their Own Way"; Transliteration: "Sorezore no Michi o Mezashite" (Japanese: それぞれの道をめざして) | Mitsuo Hashimoto; Storyboarded by : Yukio Ebisawa | Keiji Terui | Yukio Ebisawa | October 26, 1988 | October 21, 2003 (Funimation) January 26, 2005 (Blue Water) |
| 131 | "Walking Their Own Ways" (Funimation)"Heading Out on Their Own" (Blue Water) | Mitsuo Hashimoto; Storyboarded by : Yukio Ebisawa | Keiji Terui | Yukio Ebisawa | October 26, 1988 | October 21, 2003 (Funimation) January 26, 2005 (Blue Water) |
Mr. Popo plays hide and seek with Goku to teach him about concentration and finding people's ki. Meanwhile, Tien, Krillin, Yamcha, and Chiaotzu continue their search for Korin's Tower. In doing so they happen across a small village at the base of a large mountain that the townsfolk consider to be their protecting god. Suddenly the mountain explodes and the four warriors rush to try to stop the lava flowing towards the town.
| 132 | "Hotter than Magma"; Transliteration: "Maguma yori Atsuku" (Japanese: マグマより熱く) | Minoru Okazaki | Takao Koyama | Minoru Maeda | November 2, 1988 | October 22, 2003 (Funimation) January 27, 2005 (Blue Water) |
| 132 | "Hotter than Lava" (Funimation)"Hotter than Magma!" (Blue Water) | Minoru Okazaki | Takao Koyama | Minoru Maeda | November 2, 1988 | October 22, 2003 (Funimation) January 27, 2005 (Blue Water) |
Still training with Mr. Popo, Goku can not yet harness his ki. Back on the ground, Tien, Krillin, Yamcha, and Chiaotzu each try individually to stop the flow of lava towards the defenseless village. Just as it looks like the threat has passed, the volcano erupts again with even more power. This time the four warriors work together to avert the magma for good. Training continues as the next Martial Arts Tournament is only three years away.
| 133 | "Reunion Before the Storm"; Transliteration: "Arashi no Mae no Saikai" (Japanese: 嵐の前の再会) | Yoshihiro Ueda | Takao Koyama | Katsumi Aoshima | November 9, 1988 | October 23, 2003 (Funimation) January 31, 2005 (Blue Water) |
| 133 | "Changes" (Funimation)"Reunion Before A Storm" (Blue Water) | Yoshihiro Ueda | Takao Koyama | Katsumi Aoshima | November 9, 1988 | October 23, 2003 (Funimation) January 31, 2005 (Blue Water) |
Three years have passed and all of the warriors reunite for the 23rd Martial Arts Tournament. Goku, Tien, Krillin, Yamcha, and Chiaotzu have all been training for the last three years, resulting in drastic physical changes and improvement in martial arts skills. However, on the first day of the preliminary rounds, the warriors are encountered by a new nemesis, Piccolo Jr.
| 134 | "Trouble at the Tenkaichi Tournament"; Transliteration: "Haran no Tenka'ichi Budōkai" (Japanese: 波乱の天下一武道会) | Kazuhisa Takenouchi | Takao Koyama | Masayuki Uchiyama | November 16, 1988 | October 27, 2003 (Funimation) February 1, 2005 (Blue Water) |
| 134 | "Preliminary Peril" (Funimation)"The Tournament Begins" (Blue Water) | Kazuhisa Takenouchi | Takao Koyama | Masayuki Uchiyama | November 16, 1988 | October 27, 2003 (Funimation) February 1, 2005 (Blue Water) |
Goku and Tien agree to keep it a secret that Piccolo's spawn is at the tournament. In the preliminaries, all the fighters get a chance to show off the benefits of their training. Goku demonstrates that he has learned to harness his ki. Tao surfaces again, still alive and now a cyborg. He has entered the tournament and plans to kill Goku and Tien for vengeance. Tao who had become a cyborg seriously injures Chiaotzu.
| 135 | "The Chosen Eight"; Transliteration: "Erabareta Hachinin" (Japanese: 選ばれた8人) | Mitsuo Hashimoto | Keiji Terui | Mitsuo Shindō | November 23, 1988 | October 28, 2003 (Funimation) February 2, 2005 (Blue Water) |
| 135 | "Battle of the Eight" (Funimation)"The Final Eight" (Blue Water) | Mitsuo Hashimoto | Keiji Terui | Mitsuo Shindō | November 23, 1988 | October 28, 2003 (Funimation) February 2, 2005 (Blue Water) |
Even the preliminary rounds of the 23rd Martial Arts Tournament are more brutal than those of years past. Eventually eight people come out on top to advance to the final rounds: Tien, Tao, a strangely familiar girl, Goku, Krillin, Piccolo Jr., Yamcha, and a bumbling man known as Hero. Everyone is worried that Tao will defeat Tien in the first match, but Goku is certain that Tien is stronger than Tao.
| 136 | "The Assassin Taopaipai's Counterattack"; Transliteration: "Koroshiya Taopaipai no Gyakushū" (Japanese: 殺し屋桃白白の逆襲) | Kazuhisa Takenouchi | Keiji Terui | Tomekichi Takeuchi | November 30, 1988 | October 29, 2003 (Funimation) February 3, 2005 (Blue Water) |
| 136 | "Tien Shinhan vs. Mercenary Tao" (Funimation)"Tao's Dirty Tricks" (Blue Water) | Kazuhisa Takenouchi | Keiji Terui | Tomekichi Takeuchi | November 30, 1988 | October 29, 2003 (Funimation) February 3, 2005 (Blue Water) |
Tien proves to be much stronger than Tao. Being a former student under the assassin, Tien gives Tao a chance to back down. After Tao tries to kill Tien, however, he loses all respect for his former master and takes him out easily. The battle ends up being more of an emotional victory than one of strength. Meanwhile, Goku must face the angry and familiar woman.
| 137 | "Son Goku's Marriage"; Transliteration: "Son Gokū no Kekkon" (Japanese: 孫悟空の結婚) | Yoshihiro Ueda | Michiru Shimada | Masayuki Uchiyama | December 7, 1988 | October 30, 2003 (Funimation) February 7, 2005 (Blue Water) |
| 137 | "Anonymous Proposal" (Funimation)"Goku Gets Married!" (Blue Water) | Yoshihiro Ueda | Michiru Shimada | Masayuki Uchiyama | December 7, 1988 | October 30, 2003 (Funimation) February 7, 2005 (Blue Water) |
Goku's female opponent proves to be a worthy contender, fueled by her anger at Goku. She says she will tell Goku who she is if he defeats her, which he does easily. It turns out that she is none other than Chi-Chi, daughter of the Ox King and the young girl who Goku promised he would marry many years ago. Though Goku did not understand what a bride was when the two were first betrothed, after the match he asks Chi-Chi to marry him, and she agrees delightedly. Goku warns Krillin to be careful of his powerful opponent in the next match. Realizing that Krillin is indeed strong, Piccolo Jr. agrees to show his true strength.
| 138 | "The Mysterious Man, Shen"; Transliteration: "Nazo no Otoko Shen" (Japanese: 謎の男・シェン) | Daisuke Nishio | Toshiki Inoue | Yukio Ebisawa | December 14, 1988 | November 3, 2003 (Funimation) February 8, 2005 (Blue Water) |
| 138 | "The Mysterious Hero" (Funimation)"The Mysterious Shen" (Blue Water) | Daisuke Nishio | Toshiki Inoue | Yukio Ebisawa | December 14, 1988 | November 3, 2003 (Funimation) February 8, 2005 (Blue Water) |
As a final act of desperation, Krillin unleashes a powerful Kamehameha upon Piccolo Jr., who is unaffected. After getting what Jr. thought was a fatal blow, Krillin surrenders; everyone realizes he still did very well. In the next match, Yamcha does not take his seemingly foolish opponent, Hero, seriously. However, Hero decides to battle Yamcha with his real power, exhibiting strength that surprises everyone.
| 139 | "Another Fierce Fight! Goku vs. Tenshinhan"; Transliteration: "Gekitō Futatabi! Gokū tai Tienshinhan" (Japanese: 激闘ふたたび!悟空VS天津飯) | Minoru Okazaki | Hajime Satsuki | Minoru Maeda | December 21, 1988 | November 4, 2003 (Funimation) February 9, 2005 (Blue Water) |
| 139 | "Rematch" (Funimation)"Goku vs. Tien: The Rematch!" (Blue Water) | Minoru Okazaki | Hajime Satsuki | Minoru Maeda | December 21, 1988 | November 4, 2003 (Funimation) February 9, 2005 (Blue Water) |
Hero tries to teach Yamcha as they battle, but Yamcha will hear nothing of it. Finally, after rebounding from Yamcha's toughest attack, Hero ends the match with ease. Yamcha then thanks Hero for what he has taught him. Goku realizes that Hero is Kami in a human body. In the next battle, Tien and Goku seem to be of equal strength. But after an intense bout of sparring, Tien is panting while Goku breathes normally, seeming to have the upper hand.: Note: This was the last episode of the Dragon Ball anime to air in the Shōwa era.
| 140 | "True Strength"; Transliteration: "Hontō no Chikara" (Japanese: ほんとうの力) | Osamu Kasai | Keiji Terui | Masayuki Uchiyama | January 11, 1989 | November 5, 2003 (Funimation) February 10, 2005 (Blue Water) |
| 140 | "Goku Gains Speed" (Funimation)"Goku's Heavy Secret" (Blue Water) | Osamu Kasai | Keiji Terui | Masayuki Uchiyama | January 11, 1989 | November 5, 2003 (Funimation) February 10, 2005 (Blue Water) |
Tien exhibits a drastic increase in speed, and notes that Goku has not sped up at all since the most recent tournament. However, asking for a quick pause, Goku removes his shirt, wrist bands, and boots--a combined weight of 140 kg. With the extra training weight off Goku is faster than ever. Having no other choice, Tien decides to use a new skill: 12 eyes.: Note: This was the first episode of the Dragon Ball anime to air in the Heisei era.
| 141 | "Four Tenshinhans"; Transliteration: "Yonin no Tenshinhan" (Japanese: 四人の天津飯) | Osamu Kasai | Toshiki Inoue | Katsumi Aoshima | January 18, 1989 | November 6, 2003 (Funimation) February 15, 2005 (Blue Water) |
| 141 | "The Four Faces of Tien" (Funimation)"Quadruplication" (Blue Water) | Osamu Kasai | Toshiki Inoue | Katsumi Aoshima | January 18, 1989 | November 6, 2003 (Funimation) February 15, 2005 (Blue Water) |
Tien splits his body into four separate Tiens, with a total of 12 eyes. Goku gets knocked down by their first attack, but used the opportunity to find the two weaknesses in this skill: the 12 eyes are too sensitive and each Tien is only a fourth as strong as the actual Tien. Goku uses Tien's own Taiyoken technique against him to blind the 12 eyes. Shortly after, Goku discover Tien's weak point and knocks all four Tiens out of the ring for the victory to everybody's surprise.
| 142 | "Who is Stronger?! Kami vs. Piccolo-Daimaō"; Transliteration: "Docchi ga Tsuyoi!? Kami tai Pikkoro Daimaō" (Japanese: どっちが強い!?神VSピッコロ大魔王) | Kazuhisa Takenouchi | Hajime Satsuki | Mitsuo Shindō | January 25, 1989 | November 10, 2003 (Funimation) February 16, 2005 (Blue Water) |
| 142 | "Kami vs. Piccolo" (Funimation)"Kami vs. Junior" (Blue Water) | Kazuhisa Takenouchi | Hajime Satsuki | Mitsuo Shindō | January 25, 1989 | November 10, 2003 (Funimation) February 16, 2005 (Blue Water) |
Finally Kami battles his evil half's son. He tells Goku that he must vanquish Piccolo Jr. because he knows that Goku, knowing that if Piccolo Jr. dies Kami would die as well, would not have the heart to kill Piccolo Jr.. Kami uses the Mafuba technique to seal Piccolo Jr. in a Denshi jar, just like what happened centuries earlier. Jr. counters the attack, sealing Kami in the Denshi jar instead. Before he is sealed, Kami separates from the human body he had inhabited and implores Goku to destroy Piccolo Jr. at any cost his life.
| 143 | "A Gamble on the Fate of the Earth!"; Transliteration: "Kono Yo no Unmei o Kakete!" (Japanese: この世の運命を賭けて!) | Mitsuo Hashimoto | Takao Koyama | Tomekichi Takeuchi | February 1, 1989 | November 11, 2003 (Funimation) February 17, 2005 (Blue Water) |
| 143 | "Battle for the Future" (Funimation)"For the Fate of the World" (Blue Water) | Mitsuo Hashimoto | Takao Koyama | Tomekichi Takeuchi | February 1, 1989 | November 11, 2003 (Funimation) February 17, 2005 (Blue Water) |
Piccolo Jr. confronts the team after defeating Hero, who has returned to being an ordinary human. Goku demands Piccolo Jr. gives him the Denshi jar containing Kami, in response Piccolo Jr. swallows the jar. Goku explains to the others that Hero was Kami in a human body, and that Kami and King Piccolo are the same person split into two separate entities, the good and the evil. Goku also tells the others that Piccolo Jr. is King Piccolo's identical son and is essentially a reincarnation of King Piccolo. As their final match begins, their strength appears to be equal. Soon, however, Piccolo Jr. unleashes a flurry of attacks that leaves Goku seemingly beaten as the count rises.
| 144 | "Let Loose! The Ultimate Super Kamehameha"; Transliteration: "Deta! Kyūkyoku no Chōkamehameha" (Japanese: でた!究極の超カメハメ波) | Daisuke Nishio | Toshiki Inoue | Masayuki Uchiyama | February 8, 1989 | November 12, 2003 (Funimation) February 21, 2005 (Blue Water) |
| 144 | "Super Kamehameha" (Funimation)"The Ultimate Kamehameha Wave!" (Blue Water) | Daisuke Nishio | Toshiki Inoue | Masayuki Uchiyama | February 8, 1989 | November 12, 2003 (Funimation) February 21, 2005 (Blue Water) |
Goku turned out to be just testing Piccolo Jr.'s attacks, as he usually does. As they resume battling, Goku seems to be superior to his opponent. Getting worried, Piccolo Jr. decides to unleash a devastating attack that will wipe out everyone at the tournament. Krillin reminds Goku that even if Kami dies in the course of destroying Piccolo Jr., they always have the dragon balls to revive him. Realizing this, Goku combats Piccolo's blast with his Super Kamehameha wave.
| 145 | "Piccolo-Daimaō's Super Giant-Body Technique"; Transliteration: "Pikkoro Daimaō Chōkyoshinjutsu" (Japanese: ピッコロ大魔王超巨身術) | Yoshihiro Ueda | Keiji Terui | Yukio Ebisawa | February 15, 1989 | November 13, 2003 (Funimation) February 23, 2005 (Blue Water) |
| 145 | "Junior No More" (Funimation)"King Piccolo's Gigantic Technique!" (Blue Water) | Yoshihiro Ueda | Keiji Terui | Yukio Ebisawa | February 15, 1989 | November 13, 2003 (Funimation) February 23, 2005 (Blue Water) |
Piccolo Jr. reveals his identity to everyone that he is, in fact, the reincarnation of King Piccolo. Upon hearing this, all of the spectators goes fears and rush from the arena leaving only Goku and his friends, though this works to Goku's advantage, as he no longer has to worry about innocent bystanders getting hurt. Piccolo Jr. then concentrates his energy to turn into a giant form of himself. Even though he is considerably larger, Goku still has no problem battling him. However, he says that if Piccolo Jr. were to be any bigger he would be in trouble. Of course, Piccolo Jr. does just that, becoming gargantuan.
| 146 | "Son Goku's Trap"; Transliteration: "Son Gokū no Wana" (Japanese: 孫悟空のワナ) | Minoru Okazaki | Keiji Terui | Minoru Maeda | February 22, 1989 | November 17, 2003 (Funimation) February 24, 2005 (Blue Water) |
| 146 | "Goku's Trap" | Minoru Okazaki | Keiji Terui | Minoru Maeda | February 22, 1989 | November 17, 2003 (Funimation) February 24, 2005 (Blue Water) |
As soon as Piccolo Jr. increases his size again, Goku jumps down his throat to retrieve the swallowed Denshi jar, saving Kami. Realizing he was tricked, Piccolo Jr. returns to his normal size. As they continue battling, Kami jumps in to protect Goku from a punch. Goku says he wants to fight alone and allows Piccolo Jr. to redo the punch. As the battle continues, Piccolo Jr. prepares to use his ultimate attack.
| 147 | "Nothing More That Can Be Done!!"; Transliteration: "Banji Kyūsu!!" (Japanese: 万事休す!!) | Kazuhisa Takenouchi | Toshiki Inoue | Masayuki Uchiyama | March 1, 1989 | November 18, 2003 (Funimation) February 28, 2005 (Blue Water) |
| 147 | "Goku Hangs On" (Funimation)"Hanging On!" (Blue Water) | Kazuhisa Takenouchi | Toshiki Inoue | Masayuki Uchiyama | March 1, 1989 | November 18, 2003 (Funimation) February 28, 2005 (Blue Water) |
As his friends run for cover, Goku prepares to take Piccolo Jr.'s ultimate attack. Piccolo Jr. unleashes a giant wave of energy comparable to a nuclear explosion, leveling the entire island. As the dust settles, Goku is still standing. He takes advantage of Piccolo Jr.'s weakened state after his huge energy expenditure and knocks him into the ground with a Super Kamehameha wave. Just as the count reaches nine, Piccolo Jr. lifts his head and emits an energy beam tearing a hole through Goku's body. Fortunately for Goku, the energy beam missed all of his vital organs. The final fight continues.
| 148 | "Hooray! The Earth's Strongest Man"; Transliteration: "Yatta! Chikyūjō Saikyō no Otoko" (Japanese: やった!地球上最強の男) | Osamu Kasai | Takao Koyama | Katsumi Aoshima | March 8, 1989 | November 19, 2003 (Funimation) March 1, 2005 (Blue Water) |
| 148 | "The Victor" (Funimation)"The Victor!" (Blue Water) | Osamu Kasai | Takao Koyama | Katsumi Aoshima | March 8, 1989 | November 19, 2003 (Funimation) March 1, 2005 (Blue Water) |
After Piccolo Jr. weakens Goku to the point where he can't lift any limbs (including the one arm his late father made the mistake of leaving Goku), Piccolo Jr. flies to the sky, like his late father, to finish off his nemesis once and for all. However, unknown to Piccolo Jr. and the others, Goku now can fly, and he uses the opportunity to headbutt Piccolo Jr. in mid-air for a ring out victory. Later, Goku uses a sensu bean on himself and to revive Piccolo, not wanting to jeopardize Kami's health to disappear the Dragon Balls. Piccolo Jr. shows complete contempt for this, thinking Goku to be soft, and departs after vowing to defeat Goku.
| 149 | "Wedding Dress in Flames"; Transliteration: "Honō no Naka no Uedingu Doresu" (Japanese: 炎の中のウエディングドレス) | Daisuke Nishio | Takao Koyama | Mitsuo Shindō | March 15, 1989 | November 20, 2003 (Funimation) March 2, 2005 (Blue Water) |
| 149 | "Dress in Flames" (Funimation)"A Wedding Dress in Flames" (Blue Water) | Daisuke Nishio | Takao Koyama | Mitsuo Shindō | March 15, 1989 | November 20, 2003 (Funimation) March 2, 2005 (Blue Water) |
Everyone starts heading home after Goku's victory in the tournament. Goku and Chi-Chi headed towards Chi-Chi's new home. Goku eats many meals (which surprises all the maids and chefs). The Ox King shows Chi-Chi's wedding dress which belonged to her mother. Suddenly a blast of fire envelopes the entire castle! Everyone heads out except the Ox King, who stays to retrieve the wedding dress. The Ox King gets trapped in his own castle and Goku and Chi-Chi head to Baba for help.
| 150 | "The Phantom Fire-Eating Bird"; Transliteration: "Maboroshi no Hi Kui Dori" (Japanese: 幻の火喰い鳥) | Yoshihiro Ueda | Keiji Terui | Tomekichi Takeuchi | March 22, 1989 | November 24, 2003 (Funimation) March 3, 2005 (Blue Water) |
| 150 | "The Fire-Eater" (Funimation)"The Fire-Eater!" (Blue Water) | Yoshihiro Ueda | Keiji Terui | Tomekichi Takeuchi | March 22, 1989 | November 24, 2003 (Funimation) March 3, 2005 (Blue Water) |
The people of Frying Pan are unable to extinguish the flames consuming the castle. Goku and Chi-Chi seek the Turtle hermit's help to make another Bansho fan. Goku and Chi-Chi travel south to get one of the materials. In the volcano, Goku calms down an inhabiting beast. Mai and Shu are after the Fire Eater as well. Chi-Chi finds a large egg being warmed by a scientist who explains what became of the Fire Eaters. Emperor Pilaf, Mai and Shu burst in, but they flee when Goku smashes their drill vehicle. A surviving Fire Eater comes out of the crater and hatches the egg. After Goku and Chi-Chi escape with the scientist, they are disappointed to come empty handed (Chi-Chi has kept an egg fragment). The scientist tells them where they can find the Bansho fan.
| 151 | "Thanks to Chi-Chi's Homemaker Training..."; Transliteration: "Chichi no Hanayome Shugyō no Okage Desu" (Japanese: チチの花嫁修業のおかげです) | Kazuhisa Takenouchi | Takao Koyama & Katsuyuki Sumisawa | Masayuki Uchiyama | April 5, 1989 | November 25, 2003 (Funimation) March 7, 2005 (Blue Water) |
| 151 | "Outrageous Octagon" (Funimation)"The Curse of Crimson Peak!" (Blue Water) | Kazuhisa Takenouchi | Takao Koyama & Katsuyuki Sumisawa | Masayuki Uchiyama | April 5, 1989 | November 25, 2003 (Funimation) March 7, 2005 (Blue Water) |
Goku and Chi-Chi reach the mountain, but as they get close, a blizzard starts up. They meet an old woman named Octagon. She tells the mountain is disrupted by the presence of females but knows nothing about the Bansho fan. Goku goes to the mountain to gather snow while Pilaf, Shu and Mai are searching after the fan. The mountain starts up another blizzard. The cold weather prevents Pilaf from firing missiles and flamethrowers on Goku. Hearing from Goku that the mountain is provoked by women, Pilaf pushes Mai away. While Goku gathers snow and scares Pilaf, Chi-Chi cleans up Octagon's house, but smashes many of her dishes. Chi-Chi comes across the Bansho fan as she sweeps the yard, while Goku's snow is melting. Shu takes the fan but blows away his companions and flees. Before Goku and Chi-Chi leave, Octagon gives them a jar of honey. The Ox King is getting desperate as they successfully return. Goku waves the fan, but the flames persist.
| 152 | "Hurry, Goku! The Mysterious Mountain of Five Elements"; Transliteration: "Isoge Gokū! Gogyōzan no Nazo" (Japanese: いそげ悟空!五行山のなぞ) | Mitsuo Hashimoto | Takao Koyama & Katsuyuki Sumisawa | Yukio Ebisawa | April 12, 1989 | November 26, 2003 (Funimation) March 8, 2005 (Blue Water) |
| 152 | "Mystery of the Dark World" (Funimation)"The Mystery of Mt. Five Elements!" (Blue Water) | Mitsuo Hashimoto | Takao Koyama & Katsuyuki Sumisawa | Yukio Ebisawa | April 12, 1989 | November 26, 2003 (Funimation) March 8, 2005 (Blue Water) |
Baba warns Goku that the fan won't work and he must go to the Magical Furnace in the Dark World and meet Tajoro. Goku and Chi-Chi journey and enter the Dark World. They jump over a large gap on the road and get chased by bats. As Goku and Chi-Chi go further things become more dangerous, but they discover all the dangers are imaginary and proceed. The Ox King gets trapped at the peak of the castle. Goku meets his deceased grandfather Gohan at the furnace, who tells him Tajoro is called Amin. Goku wants to put out the furnace which Gohan and Amin object to.
| 153 | "Mt. Frypan is Burning! An Instant Do-or-Die Journey"; Transliteration: "Moeru Furaipan Yama! Isshun no Kesshikō" (Japanese: 燃えるフライパン山!一瞬の決死行) | Minoru Okazaki | Takao Koyama | Minoru Maeda | April 19, 1989 | December 1, 2003 (Funimation) March 9, 2005 (Blue Water) |
| 153 | "The End, the Beginning" (Funimation)"The Quest to Save a King" (Blue Water) | Minoru Okazaki | Takao Koyama | Minoru Maeda | April 19, 1989 | December 1, 2003 (Funimation) March 9, 2005 (Blue Water) |
Gohan and Amin won't let Goku turn off the furnace for the simple reason that spirits wouldn't have access to their afterlife especially evil spirits. Instead of helping Goku, Amin resorts to fighting him. Amin formulates a plan after seeing Goku has the Bansho fan. Luckily, Chi-Chi has both vital requirements on her. With aid of the Bansho fan and Amin lifting the pot, Goku descends into the furnace and manages to seal the hole, barely making it out alive. The flames at the castle have died down and the Ox King has survived, keeping the wedding dress intact. Goku and Chi-Chi proceed with their wedding and the two of them are married while Baba reads the future free.

== See also ==
- List of Dragon Ball films
