= Dragon Ball Z: Kakarot =

2020 video game

- Developer: CyberConnect2
- Publisher: Bandai Namco Entertainment
- Director: Akihiro Anai
- Producers: Taichiro Miyazaki; Yuki Nishikawa; Ryosuke Hara
- Writers: Yasuhiro Noguchi; Shinsaku Sawamura
- Composers: Yasushi Asada; Noriko Murakami; Keisuke Ito; Eisei Kudo
- Series: Dragon Ball
- Engine: Unreal Engine 4
- Platforms: PlayStation 4; Xbox One; Windows; Nintendo Switch; Stadia; PlayStation 5; Xbox Series X/S
- Release: January 16, 2020: PS4, Xbox One; JP: January 16, 2020; WW: January 17, 2020 Windows; WW: January 17, 2020; JP: May 23, 2024 Nintendo Switch; WW: September 24, 2021 Stadia; WW: October 26, 2021 PlayStation 5; JP: January 12, 2023; WW: January 13, 2023 Xbox Series X/S; WW: February 3, 2023
- Genres: Action role-playing, fighting
- Mode: Single-player

Dragon Ball Z: Kakarot (ドラゴンボールZ カカロット, Doragon Bōru Zetto Kakarotto) is an action role-playing game developed by CyberConnect2 and published by Bandai Namco Entertainment, based on the Dragon Ball franchise. It was released for PlayStation 4, Xbox One and Windows in January 2020, Nintendo Switch in September 2021, Stadia in October 2021, PlayStation 5 in January 2023, and Xbox Series X/S in February 2023. The game follows the main protagonist Goku and the Z-Fighters throughout the events of the Dragon Ball Z anime series, including anime-original storylines and moments.

The game received mixed reviews upon release. The game has sold over 8 million copies worldwide as of July 2024. By January 12, 2026, the game had sold 10 million copies.

== Gameplay ==
Kakarot is primarily an action role-playing game with fighting game elements. The player can battle opponents and do activities like fishing, collecting Z orbs, eating, driving in a hover car, training, and putting characters in soul emblems. The game's plot follows the progression of the anime series, as the player interacts with the surrounding world as the different playable characters. Players can explore the world and complete side quests to progress the story. The game is broken up into four storylines: the Saiyan Saga, the Frieza Saga, the Cell Saga, and the Buu Saga. Bonus storylines can be purchased as downloadable content, covering parts of Dragon Ball Super, Dragon Ball Daima, the original Dragon Ball, and two television specials.

There are seven playable characters in the base game that the player will guide throughout the story. These include Goku, Vegeta, Gohan, Piccolo, Future Trunks, Gotenks, and Vegito. As the player progresses through the game, they will unlock new characters to play.

The player is also able to select two supporting characters to aid in battles. These include all playable characters, along with Krillin, Yamcha, Tien Shinhan, Chiaotzu, Android 18, Goten, and Kid Trunks.

The bosses that appear in-game include Raditz, Nappa, Vegeta, Cui, Dodoria, Zarbon, the Ginyu Force, Frieza, Android 19, Android 20, Android 18, Android 17, Cell, Cell Jr., Pui Pui, Yakon, Dabura, Majin Vegeta, Majin Buu, Super Buu, Kid Buu, Beerus, and Mira. Bonyū (ボニュー), an original character designed by Dragon Ball creator Akira Toriyama for the game, also appears as a boss.

== Development ==
The game was announced in January 2019 via a trailer during Dragon Ball FighterZ World Tour Finals under the working title Dragon Ball Game: Project Z. Described as an action role-playing game, the game was said to be in development by CyberConnect2, known for their work on Asura's Wrath and Naruto Ultimate Ninja series, for PlayStation 4, Xbox One, and PC through Steam. Although initially targeting 2019 release, the final title, Dragon Ball Z: Kakarot, and the early 2020 release window were announced during Microsoft's 2019 E3 conference.

The game was released for PlayStation 4 and Xbox One consoles in Japan on January 16, and for all platforms in the west one day later on January 17, 2020. The Nintendo Switch version of the game was announced in June 2021, and released on September 24, 2021. It includes the base game and "A New Power Awakens" DLC. Versions for PlayStation 5 and Xbox Series X/S were announced in September 2022, set to launch in 2023. While the former saw a release on January 12 in Japan, and January 13 worldwide, the launch of Xbox Series X/S upgrade and its coinciding DLC was postponed to February 3 due to a game-breaking technical issue where the save data from the Xbox One version would not readily work with the Series X|S version without converting it from the original version.

=== Downloadable content ===
A downloadable content (DLC) season pass launched alongside the game in January 2020. In addition to a "Steaming-Hot Grilled Fish cooking item", the pass gradually added new modes and storylines over the course of the following year.

The first DLC for the game, titled A New Power Awakens - Part 1, was released on April 28, 2020. The DLC introduces transformations and characters seen in Dragon Ball Z: Battle of Gods.

A update was released on the October 27, 2020, which added Dragon Ball Card Warriors, a card battle mode with online multiplayer support. Service for the mode was ended in 2023, with an offline version releasing following the server shut down.

The second DLC, titled A New Power Awakens - Part 2, was released on November 17, 2020. The DLC is based on the events of Dragon Ball Z: Resurrection 'F' and introduces a new mode where players battle hundreds of enemies at a time, ending with a boss fight against Golden Frieza.

The final DLC of the season pass, Trunks: The Warrior of Hope, was released on June 10, 2021. The DLC adds a story set in Future Trunks' timeline, as seen in Dragon Ball Z: The History of Trunks, as well as an extra saga featuring Babidi and Dabura, briefly covered in the manga version of Dragon Ball Super.

During Tokyo Game Show 2022, a second season pass with three DLCs was announced for the game, along with a free next-gen update for PlayStation 5 and Xbox Series X and Series S users. The first DLC, Bardock: Alone Against Fate, was released on January 13, 2023, and covers the events of Dragon Ball Z: Bardock – The Father of Goku, along with a side story focusing on a child Vegeta. The second, The 23rd World Tournament, released on August 17, 2023, adds a new "Ground Battle" mode covering the Piccolo Jr. saga of the original Dragon Ball series anime. The third and final part, Goku's Next Journey, covers the battle between Goku and Uub, and was released on February 21, 2024.

During New York Comic Con 2024, a DLC focusing on Dragon Ball Daima, called Adventure Through the Demon Realm Part 1, was announced.

== Reception ==
Reception

Aggregate scores
| Aggregator | Score |
|---|---|
| Metacritic | PC: 73/100; PS4: 73/100; XONE: 73/100; NS: 78/100; PS5: 76/100 |
| OpenCritic | 54% recommend |

Review scores
| Publication | Score |
|---|---|
| Destructoid | 7/10 |
| Famitsu | 34/40 |
| Game Informer | 8/10 |
| GameRevolution | 4/5 |
| GameSpot | 7/10 |
| GamesRadar+ | 3/5 |
| Hardcore Gamer | 3/5 |
| HobbyConsolas | 85% |
| IGN | 7/10 |
| MeriStation | 8/10 |
| Nintendo Life | 7/10 |
| Nintendo World Report | 7/10 |
| PC Gamer (UK) | 76% |
| Slant Magazine | 2.5/5 |
| Trusted Reviews | 3.5/5 |
| Vandal | 8/10 |

Kakarot received "mixed or average" reviews for the Windows, PlayStation 4, and Xbox One versions and "generally favorable" reviews for the Switch and PlayStation 5 versions according to review aggregator Metacritic. Fellow review aggregator OpenCritic assessed that the game received fair approval, being recommended by 54% of critics. IGN's Michael Saltzman gave Kakarot a score of 7, praising its combat and story presentation, but criticized its poor RPG elements.

Kakarot was awarded 7/10 in GameSpot's review, with Heidi Kemps saying that its "modern, semi-open approach to telling the saga of DBZ - despite some minor issues - is a good one." Kemps concluded that "[i]f you're looking for an enjoyable way to see the life and times of adult Goku through a new perspective, Dragon Ball Z: Kakarot will grant your wish."

The game was the second best-selling game during its first week on sale in Japan, with 89,537 copies being sold, behind Yakuza: Like a Dragon. In the United Kingdom, Kakarot debuted at number one on the sales chart.

In a conference call, Bandai Namco revealed that the game sold over 1.5 million copies worldwide in its first week release, rendering it a commercial success. By March 2020, the game had sold over 2 million copies worldwide, combining total shipments and digital sales. By December 2021, it had sold over 4.5 million copies worldwide. Total shipments and digital sales surpassed 8 million units worldwide by July 2024. By January 12, 2026, the game had sold 10 million copies.

Dragon Ball Z: Kakarot was the best-selling game of January 2020 in the United States, and had the third highest-selling launch month for a game in the Dragon Ball franchise, behind Dragon Ball FighterZ and Dragon Ball Z: Budokai.
