= Andrew Chandler (actor) =

American actor

- Occupation: Voice actor

Andrew "Andy" Chandler is an American voice actor at Funimation who provided voices for English versions of Japanese anime series, and video games; most notably as Cooler from the Dragon Ball Z franchise and the narrator of Dragon Ball GT. He studied with the Quad C Theatre Program at Collin County Community College in Plano, Texas. Chandler has been involved in radio since 2003 and currently is voice talent, writer and imaging producer for 100.3 Jack FM in Dallas, Texas, as well as in charge of imaging for KRLD-AM, KRLD-FM, KVIL, KJKK-HD2, and KRLD-HD2. Chandler also does appearances for Jack throughout the DFW area, and is a music reporter for TXA21 television.

== Filmography ==
=== Anime ===
- A Certain Magical Index - Acqua of the Back (Season 2)
- Baka and Test 2 - Takeshi Ooshima (Eps. 5, 7)
- BECK: Mongolian Chop Squad - Yamanaka (Ep. 26)
- Burst Angel - Mac (Ep. 4)
- Case Closed - Randall, Ned Armstrong, Tequila, Martin Hartwell, Georgie, Jericho
- The Devil Is a Part-Timer! - Nord Justina
- Dragon Ball series - Spopovich (Z), General Rilldo, Narrator (GT), others
- Eureka Seven: AO - Nick Tanaka
- Fairy Tail - Scorpio
- Fullmetal Alchemist - Bald (Ep. 5)
- Gunslinger Girl - Guglielmo (Ep. 7)
- High School DxD New - Lord Gremory
- Jormungand: Perfect Order - Edgar (Eps. 4, 9, 11–12)
- Kamisama Kiss - Jiro
- Kiddy Grade - Mad Bad Bull
- Level E - Iwata
- Maken-ki! - Kai Kuragasa
- One Piece - Absalom, Yama
- Shakugan no Shana - East Edge (Seasons 2–3)
- Shin-Chan - Yoshi
- Space Dandy - Minato (Ep. 16)
- Unbreakable Machine-Doll - Cherubim
- Yu Yu Hakusho - Byakko, Bakken

=== Films ===
- Dragon Ball Z: Cooler's Revenge - Cooler
- Dragon Ball Z: The Return of Cooler - Cooler
- Fafner in the Azure: Heaven and Earth - Ian Camp
- Fairy Tail: Dragon Cry - Scorpio
- Fullmetal Alchemist: The Sacred Star of Milos - Raul / Alan

=== Video games ===
- Borderlands 2 - Marauder Scattershot
- Dragon Ball Z: Budokai 3 - Cooler
- Dragon Ball Z: Budokai - HD Collection - Cooler (Budokai 3)
- Dragon Ball Z: Supersonic Warriors 2 - Cooler
- Dragon Ball Z: Budokai Tenkaichi - Cooler
- Dragon Ball Z: Budokai Tenkaichi 2 - Cooler
- Dragon Ball Z: Budokai Tenkaichi 3 - Cooler, Spopovich
- Dragon Ball Z: Shin Budokai - Another Road - Cooler
- Dragon Ball Z: Infinite World - Cooler
- Dragon Ball: Raging Blast 2 - Cooler
- Dragon Ball Z: Ultimate Tenkaichi - Cooler
- Dragon Ball Z: Battle of Z - Cooler
- Dragon Ball Xenoverse 2 - Cooler
- Dragon Ball FighterZ - Cooler
- Dragon Ball Z: Dokkan Battle - Cooler
- Dragon Ball Legends - Cooler, Rilldo
- Dragon Ball Z: Kakarot - Spopovich
- Fullmetal Alchemist and the Broken Angel - Mudey Nemda
- Fullmetal Alchemist 2: Curse of the Crimson Elixir - Bald
- The Gunstringer - Additional Voices
- One Piece: Unlimited Adventure - Paulie
- Spikeout: Battle Street - Additional voices
- Borderlands 3 - Elite Marauder
