= Dragon Ball Z: Budokai (video game) =

2002 video game

- North American PS2 cover art
- Developer: Dimps (Note: Ported to GameCube by Pyramid, Inc.)
- Publishers: JP/PAL: Bandai; NA: Infogrames (Note: The GameCube version was released after the rebranding of Infogrames to Atari.)
- Series: Dragon Ball Z: Budokai
- Platforms: PlayStation 2, GameCube
- Release: PlayStation 2: PAL: November 29, 2002; NA: December 4, 2002; JP: February 13, 2003; GameCube: NA: October 28, 2003; PAL: November 14, 2003; JP: November 28, 2003
- Genre: Fighting
- Modes: Single-player, Multiplayer

Dragon Ball Z: Budokai, released as Dragon Ball Z (ドラゴンボールZ, Doragon Bōru Zetto) in Japan, is a fighting video game developed by Dimps for PlayStation 2 release in 2002 and GameCube release in 2003. The first game in the Dragon Ball Z: Budokai series, it is based on the Japanese anime series Dragon Ball Z, part of the manga franchise Dragon Ball. It was published in Japan by Bandai and in North America by Infogrames, and was the first console Dragon Ball video game since Dragon Ball GT: Final Bout (1997).

== Plot ==
The plot is an adaptation of the first three story arcs of Dragon Ball Z with a "What If" storyline for each arc.

In Vegeta's What If storyline, Vegeta: Saiyan Prince, Vegeta and Goku duel, and Vegeta defeats him with minimum effort. Krillin and Gohan turn up, and Vegeta beats them separately. After the battle, Vegeta speaks to himself while Yajirobe sneaks up behind him. Vegeta hears Yajirobe, and impressed by Yajirobe's bravery, offers him to become his next pupil. Yajirobe refuses, stating that he does not want to end up like Nappa. Enraged at being reminded of Nappa's death, Vegeta screams in anger, and becomes a Super Saiyan.

In Frieza's What If storyline, Rampaging Frieza, Frieza successfully beats Goku, Piccolo, Vegeta, Krillin and Gohan in battle. He succeeds in wishing for immortality with the Dragon Balls. After blowing up Namek, Frieza returns to his spaceship, deciding to destroy Earth next.

In Cell's What If storyline, A Cold-Blooded Assassin, Cell attempts to absorb 17 and 18, and successfully beats 16 in battle. He absorbs 17, but while attempting to absorb 18, Krillin jumps in the way, causing Cell to accidentally absorb Krillin. As a result, he shrinks to Krillin's size, gains similar colors to Krillin's attire, and loses much power. Yamcha and Tien show up to challenge the weakened Cell. He barely manages to beat Yamcha, but he is attacked by Tien's Tri-Beam. The real Cell wakes up in the middle of the Cell Games arena, realizing that it was a nightmare and saying that ten days was too long to wait.

== Gameplay ==
Budokai includes various game modes: Story Mode, Duel, Practice, World Tournament and The Legend of Hercule. Story consists of 3D cutscenes which progress the main plot, incorporating the voice overs from the TV anime. Divided into a number of chapters, the idea is to recreate several prominent moments from the Dragon Ball series. It covers three story arcs: Saiyan, Android and Cell Games, and the player can unlock capsules or other characters for use. Depending on which episode is being played, the playable characters are Goku, Gohan, Piccolo and Vegeta. At the end of every story arc there are bonus what if episodes, and one plays as the main villain of that story arc; Vegeta, Frieza and Cell respectively.

World Tournament represents a sequence of battles in a tree-based tournament between eight to twenty competitors. There are three difficulty variations (Novice, Adept, Advanced), and each of them have to be completed first in order to unlock the next setting. Duel allows the players to fight with no restrictions and two versions of each character.

By winning the battles, the players can win prizes that are used to build up an existing character. Each one can be optionally customized by using a 7-slot skill tray; players may choose up to seven skills and assign them to a character. Some skills can take up multiple slots. These skills can be used in "World Tournament" Mode and Versus Mode. Skills may be purchased from Mr. Popo with the prize money from the World Tournament mode.

Besides punch, kick and guard moves, a "ki" button can launch smaller balls as long as there is enough energy. If it gets connected with the end of a combo, a special move will be executed. There are three types of skills: Special Moves, which include skills such as the Kamehameha Wave and the ability to become Super Saiyan; Physical, which includes such skills as Zanku Fist; and Equipment, which provide boosts such as increased defense. One can also purchase Dragon Balls, and when the player has collected all of them, Oolong appears and summons Shenron, giving the player a choice of three Breakthrough capsules; these allow a player to use all of a character's moves and abilities at once.

The game's roster consists of 23 playable characters. According to the game's voice files, Cui was also meant to be a playable character, but he was scrapped and replaced by the Great Saiyaman, the only character from the Majin Buu story arc in the game.

== Reception ==
Reception

Aggregate score
| Aggregator | Score | |
| Aggregator | GameCube | PS2 |
|---|---|---|
| Metacritic | 65/100 | 67/100 |

Review scores
| Publication | Score | |
| Publication | GameCube | PS2 |
|---|---|---|
| Game Informer | 7.25/10 | 7.25/10 |
| GamePro | 3.5/5 | 3.5/5 |
| GameSpot | 6.9/10 | 6.9/10 |
| GameSpy | 3/5 | 2/5 |
| GameZone | 6/10 | 7.2/10 |
| IGN | 6.4/10 | 6.2/10 |
| Nintendo World Report | 7/10 | N/A |
| Official U.S. PlayStation Magazine | N/A | 3.5/5 |
| X-Play | 2/5 | 2/5 |
| Entertainment Weekly | N/A | C |

Dragon Ball Z: Budokai received "mixed or average" reviews on both platforms according to the review aggregation website Metacritic. Entertainment Weekly gave the PlayStation 2 version a C and said that its characters, "while lacking artistic detail, still yell, grunt, and move almost exactly like their broadcast counterparts."

In Japan, Dragon Ball Z sold 648,000 copies, including 570,000 for the PlayStation 2 and 78,000 for the GameCube. In the United States, the PlayStation 2 version of Budokai had sold 2.04 million copies and earned $69,000,000 (equivalent to $124,000,000 in 2025) by 2007. Next Generation ranked it as the 17th highest-selling game launched for the PlayStation 2, Xbox or GameCube between January 2000 and July 2006 in that country. The game sold a total of 2.688 million copies in Japan and the United States.
