= Dragon Ball Z: Budokai =

Fighting video game series

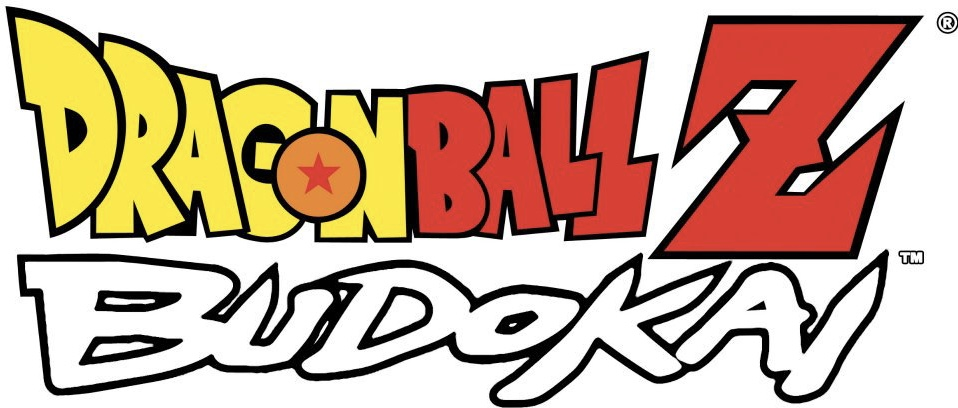
- Genre: Fighting
- Developer: Dimps
- Publishers: JP/EU: Bandai; NA/AUS: Infogrames; (Budokai PlayStation 2): NA/AUS: Atari; (Budokai 2 onward)
- Platforms: PlayStation 2, GameCube, PlayStation 3, Xbox 360
- First release: Dragon Ball Z: Budokai; November 29, 2002
- Latest release: Dragon Ball Z: Budokai HD Collection; November 2, 2012

Dragon Ball Z: Budokai, known as in Japan as simply Dragon Ball Z, is a series of fighting video games based on the anime series Dragon Ball Z, itself part of the larger Dragon Ball franchise.

== Gameplay ==
The Budokai series combines the gameplay elements of both Dragon Ball GT: Final Bout and Dead or Alive 3. The controls include regular punch and kick buttons, as well as the ability to unleash ki blasts as standard projectiles, which can also be used in specific special moves via input codes.

The special moves are mainly taken directly from the anime, including Son Goku's Kamehameha, Vegeta's Galick Gun, and Frieza's Death Beam.

Although these mechanics have stuck with the series, other ideas such as the "Hyper Mode", the ability to move at incredible speeds, fly freely, and "Beam Struggles" between two characters' beam attacks, were later replaced in favour of other techniques.

== History ==
=== Main series ===
==== Dragon Ball Z: Budokai (2002) ====
Dragon Ball Z: Budokai, released as Dragon Ball Z (ドラゴンボールZ, Doragon Bōru Zetto) in Japan, is a fighting game released for the PlayStation 2 on November 29, 2002, in Europe and on December 3, 2002, in North America, and for the GameCube on October 28, 2003, in North America and on November 14, 2003, in Europe. It is the first Budokai game of the series and the first Dragon Ball Z game to be released in all of Europe instead of having specific releases in France, Spain, and Portugal like earlier games. The game was released in Japan by Bandai on the PlayStation 2 on February 13, 2003, and on the GameCube on November 28, 2003. It was developed by Dimps and published by Infogrames and later by Atari as a Greatest Hits title for the PlayStation 2 in North America.

The game includes a total of 23 playable characters, and the story follows the first three story arcs/sagas of the Dragon Ball Z franchise starting the Saiyan Saga, the Planet Namek saga and ends with SSJ2 Gohan's final battle with Cell in the Android Saga. Features include a story mode, a versus mode, a World tournament stage, a practice mode, and an items shop which allows players to purchase customization abilities using money gained through challenges in the story mode and tournament victories to make custom fighters. Story mode is divided into special chapters, initially having the player fight predominantly as Goku and Gohan through the Saiyan, Namek and Android Sagas before unlocking bonus chapters from different perspectives like Piccolo and Vegeta. The story mode also includes a few "what if" episodes to play with the villains of each saga, retelling iconic Dragon Ball events with different outcomes. A cel-shading effect was added to the graphics in the GameCube version.

The North American versions feature English voice acting from the North American Funimation dub, while the European versions feature the original Japanese voice acting and several European languages text translations.

==== Dragon Ball Z: Budokai 2 (2003) ====
Dragon Ball Z: Budokai 2, released as Dragon Ball Z 2 (ドラゴンボールZ2, Doragon Bōru Zetto Tsū) in Japan, is a fighting game and a sequel to Dragon Ball Z: Budokai and was developed by Dimps and published by Atari for the PlayStation 2 and GameCube. It was released for the PlayStation 2 in North America on December 4, 2003, and on the GameCube on December 15, 2004. The game was published in Japan by Bandai and released for the PlayStation 2 on February 5, 2004.

The game features a tournament stage, versus mode, and an item shop. Unlike its predecessor, Budokai 2's story mode, called Dragon World, introduces a unique retelling of all four chapters of Z and plays like a board game as the player assembles a team of Z-fighters alongside Goku to challenge the series' villains. The game has 31 playable characters, including fusions of different fighters, and Majin Buu's various absorbed forms. Many of these forms are unique to Budokai 2, including an original fusion between Tien and Yamcha called Tiencha and Super Buu absorbing Vegeta, Frieza, Cell, and Tien and Yamcha simultaneously, which does not appear in future games. The Japanese version of the game adds new costumes as well as a new stage in story mode. Some of the added costumes were included in the North American GameCube version.

Once again, the North American versions feature English voice acting from the North American Funimation dub. The European PlayStation 2 version also features it, while the later European GameCube version switched back to the original Japanese voice acting because of negative feedback from players who were used to the Japanese dub since the 16-bit era.

==== Dragon Ball Z: Budokai 3 (2004) ====
Dragon Ball Z: Budokai 3, released as Dragon Ball Z 3 (ドラゴンボールZ3, Doragon Bōru Zetto Surī) in Japan, is a fighting game developed by Dimps and published by Atari for the PlayStation 2. It was released on November 16, 2004, in North America in both a standard and Limited Edition release, the latter of which included a DVD featuring a behind the scenes looks at the game's development. In Europe, it was released on November 19, 2004, by Bandai, who also released the game in Japan on February 10, 2005.

The Japanese version of Budokai 3 added several costumes not present in the North American and European versions. The North American Greatest Hits version of Budokai 3 adds these costumes, as well as the option to switch the audio to Japanese for the first time in North America. This version was also released in Europe as a re-release of the game under the title Dragon Ball Z: Budokai 3 – Collector's Edition. From this release onwards, all Dragon Ball Z games in North America and Europe were released with dual voice language options in English and Japanese. as well as some graphical tweaks. This was also the first game to introduce Beam Struggles in the series.

It received runner-up placements in GameSpot's 2004 "Best Fighting Game" and "Best Game Based on a TV or Film Property" award categories across all platforms.

=== Other games ===
==== Dragon Ball Z: Shin Budokai (2006) ====
Dragon Ball Z: Shin Budokai (ドラゴンボールZ 真武道会, Doragon Bōru Zetto Shin Budôkai; Dragon Ball Z: True Tournament) is a fighting video game part of the Dragon Ball Z franchise, developed by Dimps and released in North America on March 7, 2006, in Europe on May 25, 2006, and in Japan on April 20, 2006, for the PlayStation Portable. The game's story mode is based on the events of the movie Dragon Ball Z: Fusion Reborn. The choices the player makes in the story determine how the story evolves.

==== Dragon Ball Z: Shin Budokai – Another Road (2007) ====
Dragon Ball Z: Shin Budokai – Another Road (known simply as Dragon Ball Z: Shin Budokai 2 (ドラゴンボールZ 真武道会2, Doragon Bōru Zetto Shin Budôkai Tzū; Dragon Ball Z: True Tournament 2) in Japan and Europe).

The game features an original story that tells the tale of Majin Buu being released in Future Trunks' timeline. As Majin Buu is too strong for Trunks to handle alone, he uses his time machine to recruit the original Z warriors for assistance, eventually succeeding in the destruction of Majin Buu.

==== Dragon Ball Z: Budokai – HD Collection (2012) ====
The Dragon Ball Z: Budokai – HD Collection is a video game compilation that includes remastered versions of Budokai and Budokai 3, alongside full Trophy and Achievements support. The collection was released in Europe on November 2, 2012, and in North America on November 6, 2012, for PlayStation 3 and Xbox 360.

Both games include the optional original Japanese language track, but also feature reused soundtracks from the US and European versions of the Budokai Tenkaichi games (known in Japan as the Sparking! series), whereas the soundtracks from the original PS2 versions were made by Kenji Yamamoto. This is because Yamamoto had used actual commercial songs as a basis for the music for the Dragon Ball Z games he worked on as well as Dragon Ball Z Kai and as a result, Yamamoto was fired by Toei Animation in 2011, and all the soundtracks he did for Dragon Ball Z Kai were replaced by Shunsuke Kikuchi's scores.

== Playable characters ==
Character	Budokai	Budokai 2	Budokai 3	Shin Budokai	Shin Budokai: Another Road
Goku	✓	✓	✓	✓	✓
Kid Gohan	✓	✗	✓	✗	✗
Teen Gohan	✓	✓	✓	✓	✓
Great Saiyaman	✓	✓	✓	✗	✗
Vegeta	✓	✓	✓	✓	✓
Trunks	✓	✓	✓	✓	✓
Piccolo	✓	✓	✓	✓	✓
Krillin	✓	✓	✓	✓	✓
Tien	✓	✓	✓	✗	✗
Yamcha	✓	✓	✓	✗	✗
Android 16	✓	✓	✓	✗	✗
Android 17	✓	✓	✓	✗	✗
Android 18	✓	✓	✓	✓	✓
Android 19	✓	✗	✗	✗	✗
Frieza	✓	✓	✓	✓	✓
Dodoria	✓	✗	✗	✗	✗
Zarbon	✓	✗	✗	✗	✗
Captain Ginyu	✓	✓	✓	✗	✗
Recoome	✓	✓	✓	✗	✗
Cell	✓	✓	✓	✓	✓
Hercule	✓	✓	✓	✗	✗
Nappa	✓	✓	✓	✗	✗
Raditz	✓	✓	✓	✗	✗
Goten	✗	✓	✓	✗	✗
Gohan	✗	✓	✓	✓	✓
Kid Trunks	✗	✓	✓	✗	✗
Videl	✗	✓	✓	✗	✗
Supreme Kai	✗	✓	✓	✗	✗
Dr. Gero (Android 20)	✗	✓	✓	✗	✗
Dabura	✗	✓	✓	✗	✓
Majin Buu	✗	✓	✓	✗	✓
Super Buu	✗	✓	✓	✗	✓
Kid Buu	✗	✓	✓	✓	✓
Saibamen	✗	✗	✓	✗	✗
Cell Jr.	✗	✗	✓	✗	✗
Bardock	✗	✗	✓	✗	✓
Cooler	✗	✗	✓	✓	✓
Broly	✗	✗	✓	✓	✓
Omega Shenron / Syn Shenron	✗	✗	✓	✗	✗
Oob/Uub	✗	✗	✓	✗	✗
Kid Goku	✗	✗	✓	✗	✗
Janemba	✗	✗	✗	✓	✓
Pikkon	✗	✗	✗	✓	✓
Future Gohan	✗	✗	✗	✗	✓
Gotenks	✗	✓	✓	✓	✓
Gogeta	✗	✗	✓	✓	✓
Vegito	✗	✓	✓	✓	✓

== Music ==
=== Dragon Ball Z & Z 2 Original Soundtrack ===
Dragon Ball Z & Z 2 Original Soundtrack

Soundtrack album by Kenji Yamamoto
- Released: January 19, 2005
- Recorded: 2002–2003
- Studios: O'Henry Studios (Burbank, California, U.S.); Henson Studios (Los Angeles, California, U.S.); Sound Chamber Recorders (Los Angeles, California, U.S.); 59's Laboratory, Inc. (Tokyo, Japan); Teruo Mu's home studio (Tokyo, Japan); ROJAM Studio (Tokyo, Japan)
- Genre: Anime/Video game
- Length: 68:28
- Language: Japanese
- Labels: Team Entertainment; Sony Music Entertainment Japan
- Producers: Daisuke Uchiyama (Bandai Co., Ltd.); Kenji Yamamoto

Budokai Soundtrack chronology
Dragon Ball Z & Z 2 Original Soundtrack	Dragon Ball Z 3 Original Soundtrack

Dragon Ball Z & Z 2 Original Soundtrack (ドラゴンボールZ & Z2 オリジナルサウンドトラック, Doragon Bōru Zetto ando Doragon Bōru Zetto Tzu Orijinaru Saundotorakku) is the official licensed soundtrack of the first two Dragon Ball Z: Budokai & Budokai 2 for PlayStation 2 and GameCube video games. It was released by Team Entertainment on January 19, 2005, in Japan only.

This release was unique in that composer Kenji Yamamoto collaborated with not just the standard Japanese performers of American as well as Japanese artists. American credits include Steve Lukather, Simon Phillips, and Mike Porcaro of the rock band Toto and R&B Soul Funk band Tower of Power who can predominately be heard on tracks 22–24, but despite these credits the album remains a Japanese exclusive. The American artists were hired through the American Federation of Musicians labor union and were contracted by Dan Savant with recordings for the soundtrack taking place in Los Angeles, California, U.S., Burbank, California, U.S., and later in Tokyo, Japan at Yamamoto's home studio and Teruo Mu's home studio. Because this release focuses on the first two PS2 DBZ games, many of Yamamoto's orchestrated tracks heard in the story modes of both games were left out. Prompting many fans digitally rip music straight from the games themselves. For the most part, the tracks featured are very rock oriented with only a few featuring a jazzy funk vibe thanks in part to Tower of Power's influence. The back of the jewel casing gives both Japanese and English track listings for the songs, but the English list is not a direct translation of the Japanese. Instead, they are the names that were provided when the games were released as Budokai and Budokai 2. Easily giving the impression that the soundtrack producer anticipated a big demand of importing the album by fans in English-speaking countries. Coupled with the soundtrack is a bonus DVD featuring the intro and music videos of the opening theme "Kusuburu heart ni Hi o Tsukero" performed by Hironobu Kageyama, and montage game footage.

The compositions were met with positive reviews by various gaming critics. Many critics who reviewed the first Budokai game assumed that the music, like the voice talent, was Faulconer's compositions straight from the anime. Sites like IGN and GameSpy consider the music the strongest feature of Budokai. Michael Knutson of GameZone though the tracks in Budokai 2 were upbeat and would not get repetitive.

Track listing:

1. くすぶるheartに火をつけろ!!
  Kusuburu heart ni Hi o Tsukero!!/Light a Fire in your Smouldering Heart!!
2. Big Opportunity
3. Expectation
4. 熱き風のごとく
  Atsuki Kaze no Gotoku/Like A Burning Wind
5. 勝利への疾走
  Shōri e no Shissō/Running Towards Victory
6. Move Forward Fearlessly
7. 挑戦者たち
  Chōsensha-tachi/Challengers
8. Breaking Free
9. 決戦へのカウントダウン
  Kessen e no Kauntodaun/Countdown to the Decisive Battle
10. 戦慄の刻(とき)
  Senritsu no Toki/It's Thrilling Time
11. 最強の力
  Saikyō no Chikara/Super Strength
12. BUDO～Asian Spirit～
13. FLaSH RuN aCRoSS THe UNiVeRSe
14. Spark of Fighting
15. A lot of'Qi'
16. 限界を超えて～`Qi'No Limit～
  Genkai o Koete ~'Qi' No Limit~/Breaking The Limit: 'Qi' No Limit
17. I Trust My 7th Sense～至高の力を信じて～
  I Trust My 7th Sense ~Shikō no Chikara o Shinjite~ /I Trust My 7th Sense: Believe in the Supreme Power
18. 遭遇
  Sōgū/Encounter
19. 未知の邦[くに]から来た戦士
  Michi no Kuni Kara Kita Senshi/Warrior From An Unknown Land
20. The Battle With All My Force
21. 野性の魂～Wild Soul～
  Yasei no Tamashii ~Wild Soul~/Wild-Natured Spirit: Wild Soul
22. Soul Vaccination
23. Only so Much Oil in the Ground
24. Soul With A Capital'S'
25. I'm Gonna Get Over～地平線の彼方へ～
  I'm Gonna Get Over ~Chiheisen no Kanata~/I'm Gonna Get Over: The Other Side Of The Horizon
26. Do It At All Risks
27. Full Of Tears～悲しみの淵で～
  Full of Tears ~Kanashimi no Fuchi de~/Full of Tears: In The Depths Of Sadness
28. The Man Called 'C'

When the games were released in English-speaking countries, names of various tracks including the theme song were changed in order to localize despite that this soundtrack has not been released in English-speaking countries. As follows are those changes.

1. Go For It!!
4. Take It On!!
19. A Stranger

=== Dragon Ball Z 3 Original Soundtrack ===
Dragon Ball Z 3: Original Soundtrack

Soundtrack album by Kenji Yamamoto
- Released: March 2, 2005
- Studios: O'Henry Studios (Burbank, California, U.S.); ROJAM Studio (Tokyo, Japan); Hitokuchizaka Studio (Tokyo, Japan); 59's Laboratory, Inc. (Tokyo, Japan)
- Genres: Rock; Jazz
- Length: 77:34
- Language: Japanese
- Labels: Team Entertainment; Sony Music Entertainment Japan
- Producers: Daisuke Uchiyama (Bandai Co., Ltd.); Kenji Yamamoto

Dragon Ball Z: Budokai Soundtrack chronology
Dragon Ball Z & Z 2 Original Soundtrack (2005)	Dragon Ball Z 3: Original Soundtrack (2005)

Singles from Dragon Ball Z 3: Original Soundtrack
- 1. "俺はとことん止まらない!!" Released: February 23, 2005

Dragon Ball Z 3: Original Soundtrack (ドラゴンボールZ3 オリジナルサウンドトラック, Doragon Bōru Zetto Surī Orizinaru Saundotorakku) is the official licensed soundtrack of Dragon Ball Z: Budokai 3 for PlayStation 2 video game. It was released by Team Entertainment on March 2, 2005, in Japan only.

Like its predecessor Dragon Ball Z & Z 2 Original Soundtrack this album contains a collaboration of American as well as Japanese artists. American credits include Steve Lukather guitarist of the 80's rock band Toto and 70's R&B Soul Funk band Tower of Power, but despite these credits the album remains a Japanese exclusive. The opening theme "Ore wa Tokoton Tomaranai" is performed by Hironobu Kageyama. The American musicians were, like its predecessor, were hired through the American Federation of Musicians labor union and were contracted by Dan Savant with recordings for the soundtrack taking place in Burbank, California, U.S., and later in Tokyo, Japan at Yamamoto's home studio, 59's Laboratory, Inc.. As its title suggests this release stays focused on tracks that are heard on Budokai 3, unlike its predecessor which focused on the first two games on a single disc. As a result, the soundtrack's track list appears to contain a more complete selection. However, many compositions that were featured throughout the trilogy's story modes yet were left out of the previous soundtrack were still overlooked, prompting many disappointed fans to rip copies of the tracks straight from the game itself.

Many of these and a few cuts from the previous soundtrack were used for the North American release of Budokai Tenkaichi because at the time of that game's release neither Funimation nor Atari had secured rights to the compositions by the anime's composer Shunsuke Kikuchi which was used in that game. The cuts used appear to have rip straight from this album as the instrumentation does not loop as it did in the Budokai games. Like the previous soundtrack, the back of the album's jewel case feature track listings in both Japanese as well as English. However, a few of the English names are not all direct translations, but distinct track names the songs were given when the game was released as Budokai 3. Also like the previous soundtrack with Budokai 2's opening theme "Kusuburu Heart ni Hi o Tsukero!!", the Budokai 3 theme song "Ore wa Tokoton Tomaranai!!" is only presented in this collection its TV size version as it was heard at the beginning of the game. However, the full versions of both songs, performed by Hironobu Kageyama, were released coupled in a single disc between the two soundtrack releases.

Upon the game's release, the music received mixed reviews from gaming critics. Although it would receive high scores like 8 on GameZone, some critics still referred to the music as repetitive and corny. Yet it was appropriate for conveying the game's atmosphere. Luke Van Leuveren of PALGN states "the sound is generic but annoyingly addictive". However, Jeremy Dunham of IGN thought the music sounded terrific and Tony "Zing" Tomas of WHAM! Gaming called it top notch.

Track listing:

1. "俺はとことん止まらない!!
  Ore wa Tokoton Tomaranai!!/I Won't Stop 'Till the End!!
2. "MISSION～新しき神話を創れ～"
  MISSION ~Atarashiki Shinwa o Tsukure~/Mission: Make A New Legend
3. "天空の闘い FOR JUSTICE"
  Tenkū no Tatakai FOR JUSTICE/Sky Battle For Justice
4. "勝利へのインパルス"
  Shôri e no Inparusu/Impulse Towards Victory
5. "We Go Nuts!"～誰も眠れぬ夜～
  We Go Nuts!~Dare mo Nemurenu Yoru~/We Go Nuts!: Restless Night
6. "Under the Gibbous Moon"
7. "不屈"～Indomitable Spirit～
  Fukutsu~Indomitable Spirit~/Fortitude: Indomitable Spirit
8. "Hand"-in-Hand Fight
9. "午前0時のシャッフル"
  Gozen Zeroji no Shaffuru/12:00 Midnight Shuffle Time
10. "24-7 Crazy"
11. "疾風チャレンジャー"
  Shuppū Charenjā/Hurricane Challenger
12. "Twist of Fate"
13. "ouT oF CoNTRoL"
14. "Heartbeatが聴こえるかい?"
  Heartbeat ga Kikoeru Kai?/Can You Hear The Heartbeat?
15. "Ultra dAnce in Battlefield"
16. "銀河を超えて"
  Ginga o Koete/Over The Galaxy
17. "Night of Tempest"
18. "I'm In Tip-Top Shape"
19. "炎のOutsiders"
  Honō no Outsiders/Blazing Outsiders
20. "Flight in the Dark side"
21. "暁"(あかつき)の闘い
  Akatsuki no Tatakai/Daybreak Battle
22. "魔の勢力"
  Ma no Seiryoku/Might of Evil
23. "Ultimatum"～最後通牒～
  Ultimatum ~Saigo-Tsūchô~/Surrender Or Perish
24. "暗黒からの強者"
  Ankoku kara no Kyôsha/Powerful Man From The Darkness
25. "宇宙最大の作戦"～Great Tactics～
  Uchū Saidai no Sakusen~Great Tactics~/The Greatest Tactics in the Universe: Great Tactics
26. "青空を抱きしめて"
  Aozora o Dakishimete/Embrace The Blue Sky
27. "Expectation"(Remix)
28. "Twist of Fate"～ouT oF CoNTRoL (Remix)

Track name changes Like the game's previous two installments, the names of various music tracks were changed when it was released in English-speaking countries as Budokai 3 for localization. The name changes are as follows:

1. The Ultimate Energy!!
11. Step On It
22. Warning
24. Chaos
26. Sky High

==== Ore wa Tokoton Tomaranai!! ====
"Ore wa Tokoton Tomaranai!!"

Single by Hironobu Kageyama

from the album Dragon Ball Z 3 Original Soundtrack
- Released: February 23, 2005
- Genre: Anison
- Length: 15:22
- Label: Sony Music; Team Entertainment
- Songwriters: Yuriko Mori; Kenji Yamamoto

Hironobu Kageyama singles chronology
"Sonic Drive" (2003)	"Ore wa Tokoton Tomaranai!!" (2005)	"Cha-La Head-Cha-La" (2005)

"Ore wa Tokoton Tomaranai!!" (俺はとことん止まらない!!, I Won't Stop Till The End!!) is the opening theme to Budokai 3 and a single by Japanese singer Hironobu Kageyama. It was released on February 23, 2005, in Japan only. The single peaked at #1 on Oricon. It is coupled with the opening theme to the previous video game Dragon Ball Z: Budokai 2. "Kusuburu Heart ni Hi o Tsukero!!". The single would be made available domestically through the online music service iTunes for a short time. However both song titles were erroneously written as "Oreha Tokotonntomaranai!!" and "Kusuburu Heartni Hiwotsukero!!".

Track listing:

1. 俺はとことん止まらない！！
  Ore wa Tokoton Tomaranai!!/I Won't Stop Till the End!!
2. くすぶるheartに火をつけろ！！
  Kusuburu Heart ni Hi wo Tsukero!!/Light a Fire in your Smouldering Heart!!
3. 俺はとことん止まらない！！（インストゥルメンタル）
  Ore wa Tokoton Tomaranai!! (Insuturumentaru)/I Won't Stop Till the End!! (Instrumental)
4. くすぶるheartに火をつけろ！！（インストゥルメンタル）
  Kusuburu Heart ni Hi o Tsukero!! (Insuturumentaru)/Light a Fire in your Smouldering Heart!! (Instrumental)

== Reception ==
=== Budokai ===
Budokai received "mixed or average" reviews on both platforms according to the review aggregation website Metacritic.

Many critics complained about the GameCube version's simple interface and the fact that combos weren't worth the payoff. However, more complex combos were possible due to an oversight in the move canceling feature but were rarely known at the time. These oversights were turned into an important part of the system in the later games and were what high level play tended to revolve around.

=== Budokai 2 ===
Budokai 2 received "average" reviews on both platforms according to Metacritic.

=== Budokai 3 ===
Budokai 3

Aggregate score
Aggregator	Score
Metacritic	77/100

Review scores
Publication	Score
1Up.com	B+
Game Informer	5/10
GamePro	4.5/5
GameSpot	8.2/10
GameSpy	4/5
GameZone	8.1/10
IGN	8/10
Official U.S. PlayStation Magazine	4/5
PALGN	8/10
X-Play	4/5
The Times	2/5

Budokai 3 was given much higher reviews than its predecessors Budokai and Budokai 2 according to Metacritic. This was often due to how critics felt that the game did more to improve its gameplay rather than just its graphics and presentation. Its fighting and graphics have also been praised, with IGN stating that Budokai 3 was "One of the few instances of cel-shading done right", and that it "also offers a healthy amount of special effects and pyrotechnics and they all look great."

=== Shin Budokai ===
Shin Budokai

Aggregate score
Aggregator	Score
Metacritic	70/100

Review scores
Publication	Score
1Up.com	B−
Computer and Video Games	6/10
Eurogamer	7/10
Famitsu	28/40
GameSpot	7.5/10
GamesTM	4/10
IGN	7/10
Official U.S. PlayStation Magazine	3.5/5
PALGN	7/10
PlayStation: The Official Magazine	7.5/10
The Times	3/5

Shin Budokai received "average" reviews according to Metacritic. In Japan, Famitsu gave it a score of one eight, one seven, one six, and one seven, for a total of 28 out of 40.

=== Shin Budokai – Another Road ===
Shin Budokai – Another Road

Aggregate score
Aggregator	Score
Metacritic	65/100

Review scores
Publication	Score
Famitsu	25/40
GameRevolution	C
GameSpot	6.8/10
GameSpy	3.5/5
GameTrailers	6.5/10
GameZone	7.1/10
IGN	(AU) 7.7/10 (US) 7/10
PALGN	7/10
PlayStation: The Official Magazine	6/10
X-Play	3/5

Shin Budokai – Another Road received "mixed" reviews according to Metacritic. In Japan, Famitsu gave it a score of one six, one five, and two sevens for a total of 25 out of 40.

=== Budokai: HD Collection ===
Budokai: HD Collection

Aggregate score
Aggregator	Score	
Aggregator	PS3	Xbox 360
Metacritic	64/100	63/100

Review scores
Publication	Score	
Publication	PS3	Xbox 360
PlayStation Official Magazine – Australia	5/10	N/A
PlayStation: The Official Magazine	7/10	N/A

Budokai: HD Collection received "mixed" reviews on both platforms according to Metacritic.
