= Dragon Ball Z: Budokai Tenkaichi =

- Series logo for the first three games
- Genre: Fighting game
- Developers: Spike (2005-2010); Spike Chunsoft (Sparking! Zero)
- Publishers: WW: Bandai Namco Entertainment (Note: All non-North American releases prior to Tenkaichi Tag Team. Released under the Bandai brand name prior to Sparking! Zero.); NA: Atari
- Platforms: PlayStation 2 (1–3); Wii (2–3); PlayStation Portable (Tag Team); Sparking! Zero: Microsoft Windows; PlayStation 5; Xbox Series X/S; Nintendo Switch; Nintendo Switch 2
- First release: Dragon Ball Z: Budokai Tenkaichi; October 2005
- Latest release: Dragon Ball: Sparking! Zero; 11 October 2024

Dragon Ball Z: Budokai Tenkaichi, released in Japan as Dragon Ball Z: Sparking! (ドラゴンボールZ Sparking!), is a series of fighting games developed by Spike based on the Dragon Ball franchise by Akira Toriyama. The series was published by Namco Bandai Games in Japan and Europe, and by Atari in North America and Australia until 2008. Since the third game, Bandai Namco has handled Dragon Ball game publishing in all regions, effectively ending Atari's involvement.

The original game was released in 2005 as a PlayStation 2 exclusive, while the second and third installments were released for PlayStation 2 and Wii in 2006 and 2007, respectively. A spin-off titled Tenkaichi Tag Team was released on PlayStation Portable in 2010. A new installment, Dragon Ball: Sparking! Zero, was announced in March 2023 and released in October 2024 for PlayStation 5, Windows, and Xbox Series X/S, followed by versions for the Nintendo Switch and Switch 2 released in November 2025.

== Origin of name ==
The Sparking! in the Japanese title references the last lyric found in the chorus of the first opening theme to the Dragon Ball Z anime series (1989–1996), "Cha-La Head-Cha-La" (though the opening theme to the first game in Japan is the series' second opening, "We Gotta Power"). The North American title is a rearranged version of Tenkaichi Budokai (天下一武道会, Tenka'ichi Budōkai; roughly "Strongest Under the Heavens Martial Arts Tournament"), a reoccurring tournament featured in the manga and anime series. Despite the localized title, the series is not a continuation of the Dragon Ball Z: Budokai series. It has been speculated that Atari chose to market the games as part of the Budokai series in order to capitalize on its success.

While Sparking! features rearrangements (by Takanori Arima) of actual music from Dragon Ball Z, as well as Dragon Ball (1986–1989) and the title theme of Dragon Ball GT (1996–1997) (originally composed by Shunsuke Kikuchi for the former two, and by Akihito Tokunaga for GT), the American release of the first game features recycled music from the Budokai series, composed in Japan by Kenji Yamamoto.

== Gameplay ==
Super Saiyan Goku using the Kamehameha wave against Hirudegarn in Budokai Tenkaichi 3

The games use a "behind-the-back" third-person camera perspective. Similar to the GameBoy Color -released Dragon Ball Z: Legendary Super Warriors (2002), special forms are treated as their own character, with varying stats, movesets, and fighting styles.

In battle, players can build up their Ki gauge to execute various techniques such as the Power Guard, which reduces the damage characters take by 1/4. The Ki gauge can also be used to use moves referred to as Blast 2 skills. Every character has a unique set of Blast 2 skills that allow the character to use special moves such as Ki blasts and physical attacks. Characters also have a self-recharging numeric gauge called Blast Stock that allows players to use techniques called Blast 1 skills. Blast 1 skills usually have a supportive effect such as allowing characters to regain health or immobilize the enemy. Players can also power up into a mode called Max Power Mode normally by building up their Ki beyond full at the cost of Blast Stock bars. Max Power Mode makes the character that initiated it faster, stronger, and able to use moves that are exclusive to the mode. One of these moves is the Ultimate Blast which is usually the most powerful move a character has, though use of any Blast 2 skill or the Ultimate Blast immediately ends Max Power Mode.

=== Game modes ===
In the series' story mode (called "Z Battle Gate", "Dragon Adventure", "Dragon History", and "Episode Battle" in each console installment, respectively), the objective is to compete in battles based on moments from the original manga series, as well as anime-exclusive storylines (as seen in Dragon Ball GT and several of the Dragon Ball Z films). The Dragon Balls can be acquired through story mode by destroying the environment in battle; however, the player can only keep the Dragon Ball they find if the battle is won. Each installment features several "what-if" battles and scenarios; for example, the Tenkaichi 1 story mode features modes where the player takes control of a villain and uses the character to defeat the hero, while the Tenkaichi 2 story mode has modes where Raditz and Zarbon essentially team up with the Z Fighters for one reason or another. Tenkaichi 3 features a "What If Saga", while in Sparking! Zero, the player can unlock alternate scenarios depending on decisions or battle conditions. Several levels of the Tenkaichi 2 story mode also feature cutscenes shown either before or after the fight of the level takes place. The Tenkaichi 3 story mode has cutscenes integrated into the battles themselves that are activated by hitting a certain button. These can be transformations, character changes, automatic attack use, or something as simple as a conversation. In Sparking! Zero, the "Episode Battle", which is the first to include the story of Dragon Ball Super (2015–2018), features the perspective of eight playable characters: Goku, Vegeta, Gohan, Piccolo, Frieza, Future Trunks, Goku Black, and Jiren.

The player can enter a World Tournament and try to win their way to the top. There are three levels of the basic tournament and a Cell Games mode. Since characters can fly, characters can leave the perimeter of the arena, but will be called for ringout if they touch the ground. There are no restrictions apart from the fact that the last match of the Cell Games mode is always against Perfect Cell. In Tenkaichi 1 winning the tournaments gave players a Z-Item prize while in Tenkaichi 2, players would receive money which in turn would be used on Z-Items. The World Tournament mode could be played with several entrants, but if there is more than one human player, no prize would be awarded. Sparking! Zero introduces the Tournament of Power from Dragon Ball Super where characters are not allowed to fly. Other features in the game includes more combo attacks or character specific combos, the Blast Combos, and the Z Burst Dash. The additional combo attacks will be able to help chain in more attacks for more damage and longer combos. The Blast Combo is the normal combos however by inputting another button into the attack will allow the player to use a blast attack for extra damage. Depending on the moves of the character, the player might not be able to use this feat such as Videl or Mr. Satan. The Z Burst Dash is much faster and more evasive version of the Dragon Dash. It allows the user to get behind the opponent at high speeds for either a strike or to avoid a blast 2 attack. The drawback to this technique is that it will rapidly drain the player of energy. The player can fuse characters to make a better character but some characters can not be fused. The player also has the opportunity to upgrade characters.

== Titles ==
Release timeline
2005	Budokai Tenkaichi (Sparking!)
2006	Budokai Tenkaichi 2 (Sparking! Neo)
2007	Budokai Tenkaichi 3 (Sparking! Meteor)
2008–2009
2010	Tenkaichi Tag Team (Dragon Ball: Tag VS)
2011–2023
2024	Sparking! Zero

=== Main series ===
==== Dragon Ball Z: Budokai Tenkaichi (2005) ====
Cover art for Dragon Ball Z: Budokai Tenkaichi

Dragon Ball Z: Budokai Tenkaichi, originally published as Dragon Ball Z: Sparking! (ドラゴンボールZ Sparking!, Doragon Bōru Zetto Supākingu!) in Japan, was released for PlayStation 2 in Japan on October 6, 2005, North America on October 18, 2005, and Europe on October 21, 2005.

The game features 64 playable characters and 10 stages. Players can fight across the Earth Wasteland, the Earth Rock Area, Planet Namek, the Islands, the City Ruins, the Hyperbolic Time Chamber, the Cell Games Arena, the Mountain Road, the World Tournament Arena, and Kami's Lookout.

==== Dragon Ball Z: Budokai Tenkaichi 2 (2006) ====
Cover art for Dragon Ball Z: Budokai Tenkaichi 2

Dragon Ball Z: Budokai Tenkaichi 2, originally published as Dragon Ball Z: Sparking! Neo (ドラゴンボールZ Sparking! NEO, Doragon Bōru Zetto Supākingu! Neo) in Japan, is the second installment in the series and first to be released for Wii. It was released for PlayStation 2 in Japan on October 5, 2006, Europe on November 3, 2006, North America on November 7, 2006, and Australia on November 9, 2006. The Wii version was released in North America on November 19, 2006, in Japan on January 1, 2007, in Europe on March 30, 2007, and Australia on April 5, 2007.

Though originally confirmed as being a launch title in North America for the Wii, some stores started selling the Wii version on November 15, 2006. An issue of V Jump listed January 2007 as the release date for the Japanese version of the Wii release. The game originally featured 100 characters in 136 forms and 16 stages, though the Japanese and PAL Wii versions came with five additional characters (Demon King Piccolo, Cyborg Tao, Appule, Frieza Soldier, and Pilaf Robot with its combined form).

==== Dragon Ball Z: Budokai Tenkaichi 3 (2007) ====
Cover art for Dragon Ball Z: Budokai Tenkaichi 3

Dragon Ball Z: Budokai Tenkaichi 3, originally published as Dragon Ball Z: Sparking! Meteor (ドラゴンボールZ Sparking! METEOR, Doragon Bōru Zetto Supākingu! Meteo) in Japan, is the third installment of the Budokai Tenkaichi series. The game was released for PlayStation 2 and Wii in Japan on October 4, 2007, in North America on November 13, 2007, and in Europe on November 9, 2007, for the PlayStation 2, while the Wii version was released in Japan on October 4, 2007, in North America on December 3, 2007, and in Europe and Australia on February 15, 2008. Tenkaichi 3 features 98 characters in 161 forms, the largest roster in a fighting game at the time.

Several new notable features include Battle Replay, which allows players to record fights and save them to an external memory card; night and day stages, which allows certain characters ability to transform; and Wii-exclusive online multiplayer capability, the first game in the series to have such a feature. Players can fight against anyone from around the globe with a ranking system showing the player's current standing compared to anyone else who has played online. The PlayStation 2 version features the "Disc Fusion System", where inserting a Tenkaichi 1 or Tenkaichi 2 disc unlocks the "Ultimate Battle" or "Ultimate Battle Z" modes, featured in the respective games needed to unlock them. The game also supports 480p for both the Wii and the PlayStation 2 versions.

Other features include more combo attacks or character specific combos, Blast Combos, and the Z Burst Dash. The additional combo attacks are able to help chain in more attacks for more damage and longer combos. The Blast Combos are normal combos used in the game, however by inputting another button into the attack will allow the player to use a blast attack for extra damage. Depending on the moves of the character the player might not be able to use this feat such as Videl or Hercule. The Z Burst Dash is a much faster and more evasive version of the Dragon Dash. It allows the user to get behind the opponent at high speeds for either a strike or to avoid a blast 2 attack. The drawback to this technique is that it will rapidly drain the player of energy. Also to charge up all their energy, the player must have one blast one stock filled up to power up to the very limit.

==== Dragon Ball: Sparking! Zero (2024) ====
Dragon Ball: Sparking! Zero (ドラゴンボール Sparking! ZERO, Doragon Bōru Supākingu! Zero) is the fourth installment of the Budokai Tenkaichi series, it is the sequel to the 2007 game Dragon Ball Z: Budokai Tenkaichi 3 and the first to be released under the Sparking! title outside of Japan. It was announced through a teaser trailer at Dragon Ball Games Battle Hour 2023. At the time of its announcement, the game's title had not been given; the name reveal would occur during a trailer shown at The Game Awards 2023.

Sparking! Zero was released for PlayStation 5, Xbox Series X/S, and Microsoft Windows on October 11, 2024. The game features both new and returning playable characters, forms, and stages, with the stages containing destructible elements, for a total of 182 playable characters. (Note: 181 plus "Goku (Mini)" from Dragon Ball Daima as a pre-order bonus character.) It includes characters, transformations, and elements from Dragon Ball Super and its film Dragon Ball Super: Broly (2018), with future downloadable content (DLC) set to include characters from the film Dragon Ball Super: Super Hero (2022) and the anime series Dragon Ball Daima (2024). The game is entirely influenced by Naohiro Shintani's animation style from Broly.

=== Other games ===
==== Dragon Ball Z: Tenkaichi Tag Team (2010) ====
Cover art for Dragon Ball Z: Tenkaichi Tag Team

Dragon Ball Z: Tenkaichi Tag Team, originally published as Dragon Ball: Tag VS (ドラゴンボール Tag VS(タッグバーサス), Doragon Bōru Taggu Bāsasu) in Japan, was originally the last traditional game in the Budokai Tenkaichi series to retain its native gameplay, and the only installment to be released on a handheld console. The game was published by Bandai Namco and released in October 2010 for PlayStation Portable.

The game focuses on two on two fights. "Dragon Walker" is the main story mode, following the events of the manga and anime series. Other modes include "Battle 100", where the player fights many teams; and "Free Battle", where the player can fight any team of their choice. Other features include the ability to perform fusions, and upgrade characters using "D-POINTS", the game's main currency.

== Characters ==
All four games includes characters in various versions, forms, and transformations. This table uses the majority of character names as featured in the most recent game in the series, Sparking! Zero.

Characters	Transformations	Budokai Tenkaichi	Budokai Tenkaichi 2	Budokai Tenkaichi 3	Sparking! Zero
Android 8	N/A	No	No	Yes	DLC
Android 13	Base	No	Yes	Yes	Yes
Android 13	Fusion Android 13	No	Yes	Yes	Yes
Android 16	N/A	Yes	Yes	Yes	Yes
Android 17 (Super)	N/A	No	No	No	Yes
Android 17 (Z)	N/A	Yes	Yes	Yes	Yes
Android 18	N/A	Yes	Yes	Yes	Yes
Android 19	N/A	Yes	Yes	Yes	Yes
Anilaza	N/A	No	No	No	Yes
Appule	N/A	No	Wii only in JAP & PAL	Yes	No
Arale	N/A	No	No	Yes	No
Babidi	N/A	No	No	Yes	Yes
Baby Vegeta (GT)	Base	No	Yes	Yes	Yes
Baby Vegeta (GT)	Super Baby 1	No	Yes	Yes	Yes
Baby Vegeta (GT)	Super Baby 2	Yes	Yes	Yes	Yes
Baby Vegeta (GT)	Great Ape	No	Yes	Yes	Yes
Bardock	Base	Yes	Yes	Yes	Yes
Bardock	Great Ape	No	Yes	Yes	No
Bardock	Super Saiyan	No	No	No	DLC
Beerus	N/A	No	No	No	Yes
Bergamo	N/A	No	No	No	Yes
Bojack	Base	No	Yes	Yes	Yes
Bojack	Full Power	Yes	Yes	Yes	Yes
Broly (Super)	Base	No	No	No	Yes
Broly (Super)	Super Saiyan	No	No	No	Yes
Broly (Super)	Super Saiyan Full Power	No	No	No	Yes
Broly (Z)	Base	No	Yes	Yes	Yes
Broly (Z)	Super Saiyan	No	Yes	Yes	Yes
Broly (Z)	Legendary Super Saiyan	Yes	Yes	Yes	Yes
Burter	N/A	Yes	Yes	Yes	Yes
Cabba	Base	No	No	No	Yes
Cabba	Super Saiyan	No	No	No	Yes
Cabba	Super Saiyan 2	No	No	No	Yes
Captain Ginyu	N/A	Yes	Yes	Yes	Yes
Caulifa	Base	No	No	No	Yes
Caulifa	Super Saiyan 2	No	No	No	Yes
Cell	1st Form	Yes	Yes	Yes	Yes
Cell	2nd Form	Yes	Yes	Yes	Yes
Cell	Perfect Form	Yes	Yes	Yes	Yes
Cell Jr.	N/A	Yes	Yes	Yes	Yes
Cell Max	N/A	No	No	No	DLC
Champa	N/A	No	No	No	DLC
Cheelai	N/A	No	No	No	DLC
Chi-Chi	N/A	No	No	Yes	DLC
Chiaotzu	N/A	Yes	Yes	Yes	Yes
Chilled	N/A	No	No	No	DLC
Cooler	Base	No	Yes	Yes	Yes
Cooler	Final Form	Yes	Yes	Yes	Yes
Cui	N/A	No	Yes	Yes	Yes
Cyborg Tao	N/A	No	Wii only in JAP & PAL	Yes	No
Dabura	N/A	Yes	Yes	Yes	Yes
Demon King Piccolo	N/A	No	Wii only in JAP & PAL	Yes	DLC
Devilman	N/A	No	No	Yes	DLC
Dodoria	N/A	Yes	Yes	Yes	Yes
Dr. Gero	N/A	Yes	Yes	Yes	Yes
Dr. Wheelo	N/A	No	No	Yes	Yes
Dyspo	N/A	No	No	No	Yes
Fasha	Base	No	No	Yes	DLC
Fasha	Great Ape	No	No	Yes	No
Frieza (Super)	Base	No	No	No	Yes
Frieza (Super)	Golden Frieza	No	No	No	Yes
Frieza (Z)	1st Form	Yes	Yes	Yes	Yes
Frieza (Z)	2nd Form	Yes	Yes	Yes	Yes
Frieza (Z)	3rd Form	Yes	Yes	Yes	Yes
Frieza (Z)	4th Form	Yes	Yes	Yes	Yes
Frieza (Z)	Full Power	Yes	Yes	Yes	Yes
Frieza Force Soldier	N/A	No	Wii only in JAP & PAL	Yes	Yes
Frost	N/A	No	No	No	Yes
Fused Zamasu	Base	No	No	No	Yes
Fused Zamasu	Half-Corrupted	No	No	No	Yes
Future Trunks (Super)	Base	No	No	No	Yes
Future Trunks (Super)	Super Saiyan	No	No	No	Yes
Gamma 1	N/A	No	No	No	DLC
Gamma 2	N/A	No	No	No	DLC
Garlic Jr.	Base	No	Yes	Yes	No
Garlic Jr.	Super Garlic Jr.	No	Yes	Yes	Yes
General Blue	N/A	No	No	Yes	DLC
Glorio	N/A	No	No	No	DLC
Gogeta (GT)	Super Saiyan 4	Yes	Yes	Yes	Yes
Gogeta (Super)	Base	No	No	No	Yes
Gogeta (Super)	Super Saiyan	No	No	No	Yes
Gogeta (Super)	Super Saiyan God Super Saiyan	No	No	No	Yes
Gohan (Adult)	Base	Yes	Yes	Yes	Yes
Gohan (Adult)	Super Saiyan	Yes	Yes	Yes	Yes
Gohan (Adult)	Super Saiyan 2	Yes	Yes	Yes	Yes
Gohan (Adult)	Great Saiyaman	Yes	Yes	Yes	Yes
Gohan (Future)	Base	No	No	Yes	Yes
Gohan (Future)	Super Saiyan	No	No	Yes	Yes
Gohan (Kid)	N/A	Yes	Yes	Yes	Yes
Gohan (Super Hero)	Base	No	No	No	DLC
Gohan (Super Hero)	Super Saiyan	No	No	No	DLC
Gohan (Super Hero)	Ultimate Gohan (Super Hero)	No	No	No	DLC
Gohan (Super Hero)	Gohan Beast	No	No	No	DLC
Gohan (Teen)	Base	Yes	Yes	Yes	Yes
Gohan (Teen)	Super Saiyan	Yes	Yes	Yes	Yes
Gohan (Teen)	Super Saiyan 2	Yes	Yes	Yes	Yes
Goku (DAIMA)	Super Saiyan 4	No	No	No	DLC
Goku (GT)	Base	No	No	Yes	Yes
Goku (GT)	Super Saiyan	No	No	Yes	Yes
Goku (GT)	Super Saiyan 3	No	No	Yes	Yes
Goku (GT)	Super Saiyan 4	Yes	Yes	Yes	Yes
Goku (Mini)	Base	No	No	No	DLC
Goku (Mini)	Super Saiyan	No	No	No	DLC
Goku (Mini)	Super Saiyan 4	No	No	No	DLC
Goku (Super)	Base	No	No	No	Yes
Goku (Super)	Super Saiyan	No	No	No	Yes
Goku (Super)	Super Saiyan God	No	No	No	Yes
Goku (Super)	Super Saiyan God Super Saiyan	No	No	No	Yes
Goku (Super)	Ultra Instinct -Sign-	No	No	No	Yes
Goku (Super)	Ultra Instinct	No	No	No	Yes
Goku (Teen)	Base	Yes	Yes	Yes	Yes
Goku (Teen)	Great Ape	Yes	Yes	Yes	No
Goku (World Tournament)	N/A	No	No	No	DLC
Goku (Z - Early)	N/A	No	No	Yes	Yes
Goku (Z - End)	Base	Yes	Yes	Yes	Yes
Goku (Z - End)	Super Saiyan	Yes	Yes	Yes	Yes
Goku (Z - End)	Super Saiyan 2	Yes	Yes	Yes	Yes
Goku (Z - End)	Super Saiyan 3	Yes	Yes	Yes	Yes
Goku (Z - Mid)	Base	No	No	Yes	Yes
Goku (Z - Mid)	Super Saiyan	No	No	Yes	Yes
Goku Black	Base	No	No	No	Yes
Goku Black	Super Saiyan Rosé	No	No	No	Yes
Goten	Base	Yes	Yes	Yes	Yes
Goten	Super Saiyan	Yes	Yes	Yes	Yes
Gotenks	Base	Yes	Yes	Yes	Yes
Gotenks	Super Saiyan	Yes	Yes	Yes	Yes
Gotenks	Super Saiyan 3	Yes	Yes	Yes	Yes
Grandpa Gohan	N/A	No	Yes	Yes	DLC
Guldo	N/A	Yes	Yes	Yes	Yes
Hell Fighter 17	N/A	No	No	No	DLC
Hirudegarn	N/A	No	Yes	Yes	Yes
Hit	N/A	No	No	No	Yes
Jaco	N/A	No	No	No	DLC
Janemba	Base	No	Yes	Yes	Yes
Janemba	Super Janemba	Yes	Yes	Yes	Yes
Jeice	N/A	Yes	Yes	Yes	Yes
Jiren	Base	No	No	No	Yes
Jiren	Full Power	No	No	No	Yes
Kakunsa	N/A	No	No	No	Yes
Kale	Base	No	No	No	Yes
Kale	Super Saiyan Berserk	No	No	No	Yes
Kale	Super Saiyan	No	No	No	Yes
Kefla	Base	No	No	No	Yes
Kefla	Super Saiyan	No	No	No	Yes
Kefla	Super Saiyan 2	No	No	No	Yes
Kid Buu	N/A	Yes	Yes	Yes	Yes
King Cold	N/A	No	No	Yes	Yes
King Vegeta	Base	No	No	Yes	DLC
King Vegeta	Great Ape	No	No	Yes	No
Krillin	N/A	Yes	Yes	Yes	Yes
Lord Slug	Base	No	Yes	Yes	Yes
Lord Slug	Giant Form	No	Yes	Yes	Yes
Ma Junior	Base	No	No	No	DLC
Ma Junior	Giant Form	No	No	No	DLC
Majin Buu	N/A	Yes	Yes	Yes	Yes
Majin Buu (Evil)	N/A	Yes	Yes	Yes	Yes
Majin Duu	N/A	No	No	No	DLC
Majin Kuu	N/A	No	No	No	DLC
Majin Vegeta	N/A	Yes	Yes	Yes	Yes
Master Roshi	Base	Yes	Yes	Yes	Yes
Master Roshi	Max Power	No	Yes	Yes	Yes
Mecha Frieza	N/A	Yes	Yes	Yes	Yes
Mercenary Tao	N/A	Yes	Yes	Yes	DLC
Meta Cooler	N/A	No	Yes	Yes	Yes
Mighty Mask (Goten & Trunks)	N/A	No	No	No	DLC
Mr. Satan	N/A	Yes	Yes	Yes	Yes
Nail	N/A	No	No	Yes	Yes
Nam	N/A	No	No	Yes	DLC
Nappa	Base	Yes	Yes	Yes	Yes
Nappa	Great Ape	No	Yes	Yes	No
Nuova Shenron	N/A	No	No	Yes	DLC
Pan (GT)	N/A	No	Yes	Yes	Yes
Panzy	N/A	No	No	No	DLC
Perfect Cell	N/A	Yes	Yes	Yes	Yes
Piccolo (Early)	N/A	No	No	Yes	Yes
Piccolo (Fused with Kami)	N/A	Yes	Yes	Yes	Yes
Piccolo (Super Hero)	Base	No	No	No	DLC
Piccolo (Super Hero)	Power Awakening	No	No	No	DLC
Piccolo (Super Hero)	Orange Piccolo	No	No	No	DLC
Piccolo (Super Hero)	Orange Piccolo - Giant Form	No	No	No	DLC
Pikkon	N/A	No	Yes	Yes	DLC
Pilaf Machine	Base	No	Wii only in JAP & PAL	Yes	No
Pilaf Machine	Fusion	No	Wii only in JAP & PAL	Yes	No
Raditz	Base	Yes	Yes	Yes	Yes
Raditz	Great Ape	No	Yes	Yes	No
Recoome	N/A	Yes	Yes	Yes	Yes
Ribrianne	N/A	No	No	No	Yes
Roasie	N/A	No	No	No	Yes
Saibaman	N/A	Yes	Yes	Yes	Yes
Salza	N/A	No	Yes	Yes	DLC
Shallot	N/A	No	No	No	DLC
Spopovich	N/A	No	No	Yes	Yes
Super 17	N/A	Yes	Yes	Yes	DLC
Super Buu	Base	Yes	Yes	Yes	Yes
Super Buu	Gotenks Absorbed	Yes	Yes	Yes	Yes
Super Buu	Gohan Absorbed	Yes	Yes	Yes	Yes
Super Gogeta (Z)	N/A	Yes	Yes	Yes	Yes
Supreme Kai	Base	No	Yes	Yes	DLC
Supreme Kai	Kibitoshin	No	Yes	Yes	No
Syn Shenron (GT)	Base	No	Yes	Yes	Yes
Syn Shenron (GT)	Omega Shenron	No	Yes	Yes	Yes
Tambourine	N/A	No	No	Yes	No
Tapion	N/A	No	Yes	Yes	Yes
Third Eye Gomah	Base	No	No	No	DLC
Third Eye Gomah	Giant Gomah	No	No	No	DLC
Tien Shinhan	N/A	Yes	Yes	Yes	Yes
Tien Shinhan (World Tournament)	N/A	No	No	No	DLC
Toppo	Base	No	No	No	Yes
Toppo	God of Destruction	No	No	No	Yes
Tora	N/A	No	No	No	DLC
Trunks (GT)	Base	No	No	No	DLC
Trunks (GT)	Super Saiyan	No	No	No	DLC
Trunks (Kid)	Base	Yes	Yes	Yes	Yes
Trunks (Kid)	Super Saiyan	Yes	Yes	Yes	Yes
Trunks (Melee)	Base	Yes	Yes	Yes	Yes
Trunks (Melee)	Super Saiyan	Yes	Yes	Yes	Yes
Trunks (Melee)	Super Trunks	Yes	Yes	Yes	Yes
Trunks (Sword)	Base	Yes	Yes	Yes	Yes
Trunks (Sword)	Super Saiyan	Yes	Yes	Yes	Yes
Turles	Base	No	Yes	Yes	Yes
Turles	Great Ape	No	Yes	Yes	No
Ultimate Gohan	N/A	Yes	Yes	Yes	Yes
Uub (GT)	Base	No	Yes	Yes	Yes
Uub (GT)	Majuub	No	Yes	Yes	Yes
Uub (Z)	N/A	No	No	No	DLC
Vegeta (DAIMA)	Super Saiyan 3	No	No	No	DLC
Vegeta (GT)	Base	No	No	No	DLC
Vegeta (GT)	Super Saiyan	No	No	No	DLC
Vegeta (GT)	Super Saiyan 4	Yes	Yes	Yes	Yes
Vegeta (Mini)	Base	No	No	No	DLC
Vegeta (Mini)	Super Saiyan	No	No	No	DLC
Vegeta (Mini)	Super Saiyan 2	No	No	No	DLC
Vegeta (Mini)	Super Saiyan 3	No	No	No	DLC
Vegeta (Super)	Base	No	No	No	Yes
Vegeta (Super)	Super Saiyan	No	No	No	Yes
Vegeta (Super)	Super Saiyan God	No	No	No	Yes
Vegeta (Super)	Super Saiyan God Super Saiyan	No	No	No	Yes
Vegeta (Z - Early)	Base	Yes	Yes	Yes	Yes
Vegeta (Z - Early)	Super Saiyan	Yes	Yes	Yes	Yes
Vegeta (Z - Early)	Super Vegeta	Yes	Yes	Yes	Yes
Vegeta (Z - End)	Base	No	Yes	Yes	Yes
Vegeta (Z - End)	Super Saiyan	No	Yes	Yes	Yes
Vegeta (Z - End)	Super Saiyan 2	Yes	Yes	Yes	Yes
Vegeta (Z - Scouter)	Base	Yes	Yes	Yes	Yes
Vegeta (Z - Scouter)	Great Ape	Yes	Yes	Yes	Yes
Vegito	Base	Yes	Yes	Yes	Yes
Vegito	Super Vegito	Yes	Yes	Yes	Yes
Vegito	Super Saiyan God Super Saiyan	No	No	No	Yes
Videl	Base	Yes	Yes	Yes	Yes
Videl	Great Saiyaman 2	No	Yes	Yes	DLC
Whis	N/A	No	No	No	Yes
Yajirobe	N/A	No	Yes	Yes	Yes
Yamcha	N/A	Yes	Yes	Yes	Yes
Zamasu	N/A	No	No	No	Yes
Zangya	N/A	No	Yes	Yes	DLC
Zarbon	Base	Yes	Yes	Yes	Yes
Zarbon	Super Zarbon	Yes	Yes	Yes	Yes
Total	257	90	135	161	181 (+ 60 DLC)

== Reception ==
=== Budokai Tenkaichi (Sparking!) ===
Reception

Aggregate score
Aggregator	Score
Metacritic	72/100

Review scores
Publication	Score
Eurogamer	4/5
GamePro	3/5
GameSpot	7/10
GameSpy	3.5/5
GameZone	8.3/10
IGN	8.2/10
Official U.S. PlayStation Magazine	3/5
PALGN	8/10
VideoGamer.com	6/10
X-Play	3/5

The Game received "average" reviews according to the review aggregation website Metacritic.

=== Budokai Tenkaichi 2 (Sparking! Neo) ===
Reception

Aggregate score
Aggregator	Score	
Aggregator	PS2	Wii
Metacritic	73/100	72/100

Review scores
Publication	Score	
Publication	PS2	Wii
Electronic Gaming Monthly	N/A	6.83/10
Eurogamer	6/10	N/A
Game Informer	N/A	6/10
GamePro	N/A	4.5/5
GameRevolution	C	N/A
GameSpot	6.5/10	6.5/10
GameSpy	3.5/5	3/5
GameTrailers	N/A	8/10
GameZone	8.1/10	8.2/10
IGN	8.3/10	8.3/10
Nintendo Power	N/A	7.5/10
PlayStation: The Official Magazine	7/10	N/A

The Game received "average" reviews on both platforms according to Metacritic. The PS2 version of the game received the 'Best Fighting Game of the Year' award from X-Play. Mark Bozon of IGN said of the controls, "The sheer speed and complexity of the controls may turn some people off, but the general combat will eventually come down to two buttons, making the game amazingly easy to learn, but nearly impossible to fully master." Nintendo Power gave the Wii version a score of 10 for "Dragon Ball Z fans", and 5.5 for "everyone else", rounding out the overall score to 7.5 out of 10.

=== Budokai Tenkaichi 3 (Sparking! Meteor) ===
Reception

Aggregate score
Aggregator	Score	
Aggregator	PS2	Wii
Metacritic	73/100	72/100

Review scores
Publication	Score	
Publication	PS2	Wii
Eurogamer	6/10	5/10
Famitsu	32/40	33/40
GameRevolution	C−	N/A
GameSpy	3.5/5	3.5/5
GameTrailers	N/A	7.6/10
GameZone	7.8/10	8/10
IGN	8/10	8/10
Official Nintendo Magazine	N/A	84%
PlayStation: The Official Magazine	3.5/5	N/A
VideoGamer.com	N/A	7/10

The Game received "average" reviews on both platforms according to Metacritic. Japanese videogame magazine Famitsu gave the PS2 version a score of 32 out of 40, while the Wii version received 33 out of 40. IGN awarded both versions of Tenkaichi 3 positively, with their only complaints being the comparatively underwhelming story mode (in comparison to Tenkaichi 2), gimmicky Disc Fusion, and the lagging Wi-Fi.

=== Tenkaichi Tag Team (Dragon Ball: Tag VS) ===
It has a score of 63% on Metacritic. GameSpot awarded it a score of 6.0 out of 10, saying "Dragon Ball Z: Tenkaichi Tag Team is just another Dragon Ball Z fighting game, and makes little effort to distinguish itself from its predecessors."

=== Sparking! Zero ===
Reception

Aggregate scores
Aggregator	Score
Metacritic	(PC) 83/100 (XSXS) 83/100 (PS5) 81/100
OpenCritic	86%

Review scores
Publication	Score
Eurogamer	4/5
GameSpot	6/10
GamesRadar+	3/5
Hardcore Gamer	3.5/5
IGN	7/10
The Games Machine (UK)	88%
VG247	4/5

Sparking! Zero received "generally favorable" reviews from critics, according to review aggregator Metacritic, and 86% of critics recommended the game, according to OpenCritic. PC Gamer called it "the best Dragon Ball game we've had since the PS2 and a generous love letter to Toriyama's classic series." On the other hand, GameSpot stated that "the frenetic fighting Dragon Ball fans expect is here, but it's marred by an overall shallow experience with more repetition than revolution."

Dragon Ball: Sparking! Zero sold over 3 million copies globally in its first 24 hours. It reached #2 in the Japanese sales charts, and #3 in the UK.

The game set a record for the most concurrent players in a paid fighting game on PC, with a peak of 122,554 players.
