= Yamcha =

Fictional character from Dragon Ball

- Dragon Ball character
- Yamcha (right) with Pu'ar, drawn by Akira Toriyama and digitally colored by Shueisha
- First appearance: Dragon Ball chapter #7 "Yamcha and Pu'ar", 11 September 1984 (Weekly Shōnen Jump 1984)
- Created by: Akira Toriyama
- Portrayed by: Joon Park (Dragonball Evolution)
- Voiced by: Japanese: Tōru Furuya (1986–2024); Ryōta Suzuki (2024–present); English: Christopher Sabat (FUNimation dub), Ted Cole (Ocean dub)

In-universe information
- Species: Superhuman
- Occupation: Professional baseball player
- Abilities: Super strength; Super speed, agility, reflexes; Stamina; Flight; Energy sensing; Energy projection; Energy absorption; Durability; Telepathy; Telekinesis

Yamcha (Japanese: ヤムチャ, Hepburn: Yamucha) is a fictional character in the Dragon Ball series created by Akira Toriyama. He is first introduced as a desert bandit and an antagonist of Son Goku in chapter #7 "Yamcha and Pu'ar", published in Weekly Shōnen Jump magazine on September 11, 1984, alongside his constant companion Pu'ar. He is eventually depicted as being reformed, becoming an ally of Goku. He was initially portrayed as gynophobic, although this characteristic has fluctuated or subsided throughout the original Dragon Ball series.

Yamcha has received mixed reviews since his inception, being criticized for his weak abilities compared to other characters, but he has also been praised as being a fun character.

== Creation ==
When Toriyama decided to create Dragon Ball, he used Chinese author Wu Cheng'en's Journey to the West as a prototype for his own series. Yamcha was respectively patterned after Sha Wujing, with his name being a pun on a form of Cantonese brunch called yum cha. A prototype for Yamcha was Gojō, the river monster, from Toriyama's one-shot series Dragon Boy.

=== Voice actors ===
In the Japanese version, Yamcha is voiced by Tōru Furuya in all media until he was replaced by Ryōta Suzuki for Dragon Ball Daima in 2024. In the Funimation English dub, Yamcha is voiced by Christopher Sabat, who currently voices him in all Dragon Ball related media. Ted Cole provided Yamcha's voice in the Ocean Group dubs of Dragon Ball Z and the BLT dub of Dragon Ball.

== Abilities ==
Yamcha is a skilled swordsman and an exceptional martial artist. His signature technique is the Rōgafūfūken (狼牙風風拳; "Wolf Fang Windy Fist"), a quick flurry of punches and kicks. After training with Master Roshi, Yamcha became Superhuman gaining Super strength, speed, agility, reflexes, the ability to fly, with telepathy, telekinesis, generate energy from his very being called ki, produce energy blasts, absorb energy and energy blasts and control energy as well as sense energy around him and enhance his abilities by increasing his energy through force of will. He has the ability to perform the Kamehameha, a concentrated beam of a chi energy blast that many other characters in the series have the ability to perform as well. Yamcha also uses the Sōkidan (繰気弾; "Winding Ki Bullet", "Spirit Ball" in the English anime dub), a technique that forms a ball of chi energy to assault an opponent with. He can fully control the ball, allowing it to home in on enemies and to go underground for a surprise attack.

== Summary ==
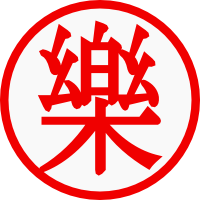
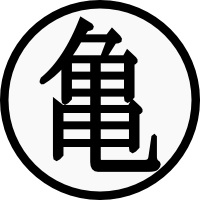
Yamcha's original outfit with his unique emblem (left) is replaced with an orange dogi bearing the emblem of the Turtle School (right) after he is formally accepted as Master Roshi's student

Yamcha enters the series ambushing Goku, Bulma, and Oolong as they are traveling through his territory and attempts to rob them of their money and hoi poi capsules. He also becomes a student under the Turtle Hermit, known as Master Roshi in the English anime, and loses a long-held fear of women through his relationship with Bulma. Yamcha also enters the 21st, 22nd, and 23rd Tenkaichi Budōkai along with Goku, but loses in the first round of each tournament, to "Jackie Chun", Tien Shinhan, and Shen (Kami) respectively. Yamcha is shown to be a baseball player in the anime filler material for Dragon Ball Z. This was suggested by the series creator Akira Toriyama.

Yamcha becomes a major league baseball player for the West City Titans. Later, Yamcha is killed along with Tien Shinhan, Chiaotzu, and Piccolo in a battle against the Saiyans. He is killed when a Saibaman grabs onto him and self-destructs. Yamcha goes on to train with King Kai in the afterlife just as Goku did, growing greatly in power. Through King Kai, he witnesses his friends' battles on Planet Namek; when Goku is thought to have been killed in the destruction of the Planet Namek after defeating Frieza, Yamcha relays the information to everyone through Bulma. He is later returned to life from a wish to Porunga and continues to live at Capsule Corp with Bulma and, after the two finally end their relationship, she and Vegeta enter a long-term relationship.

During the Android arc, Yamcha is the first to encounter Android #19 and #20, and is left for dead when #20 absorbs his chi and drives a hand through his chest. He is healed by a Senzu bean and takes the heart-diseased Goku home to get his medicine after the Super Saiyan loses to #19. Yamcha later joins the others in the Cell Games and teams up with Tien Shinhan to protect the weakened Goku from the Cell Juniors, before losing to them. Following Cell's defeat at the hands of Son Gohan and Goku's death, Yamcha and the others return to their peaceful lives. In the alternate timeline of the Cell arc, like most of the heroes, Yamcha was killed in the encounter with the Androids.

By the time of the 25th Tenkaichi Budōkai, Yamcha has given up fighting and goes with the others to be a spectator and also meet Goku, who is given a single day to return from death. Yamcha is later killed again when Majin Buu turns him into chocolate and eats him, along with Krillin, Bulma, and the other allies. During Goku and Vegeta's battle against Buu, Yamcha and Krillin try to fend off the Majin who's rampaging the Grand Kai's Planet; before he is brought back to life by the Namekian Dragon Balls, and he and the others on Earth give their energy to Goku's Genki-Dama, which he uses to destroy Majin Buu and restore peace to the universe.

Yamcha returns in Dragon Ball Super where he and Puar attend Bulma's birthday party along with the other characters, while there he meets Beerus, the God of Destruction, and later witnesses Goku's fight against the deity. Sometime after Frieza's 2nd death, he goes with the others to the Nameless Planet to watch the Tournament between Universe 6 and Universe 7. Yamcha plays a prominent role during the baseball match between Universe 6 and Universe 7, he is the team's captain uses his newly invented technique (Wolf Fang Pitching Fist) to effortlessly strike out Universe 6 during the first half of the first set, afterwards both Whis and Vados call off the match after Beerus and Champa started fighting physically, not before Vados points down to Yamcha laying at home base, scoring the winning run. During the Universal Survival saga, Yamcha expresses interest in the Tournament of Power, but is ultimately not recruited by Goku.

In the Galactic Patrol Prisoner arc, Yamcha is informed of Moro's invasion of Earth and is recruited by Gohan and the Galactic Patrol. Yamcha flies off on his own and easily defeat/subdue 3 of Moro's goons, before flying off to the next location. Yamcha soon finds himself in a difficult battle against Saganbo's adviser Zauyogi (even with the assistance of Tien and Chiaotzu). Luckily for the three, Son Goku intervenes and easily beats Zauyogi, Yamcha informs Goku to assist Son Gohan and Piccolo, whilst assuring the Saiyan that he, Tien, and Chiaotzu can handle the rest of the remaining convicts. Yamcha later appears and collectively lends his energy to Vegeta (who reverse engineers his newfound technique) in order for Goku to re-awaken Mastered Ultra Instinct. Yamcha and the others continue to view the battle until Goku attains the power-up he needed to finally defeat the earth-infused Moro. Yamcha and the others (barring Vegeta) cheer for Goku's victory, and later attend a party hosted at Mr. Satan's house.

== Appearances in other media ==
In Dragon Ball GT, Yamcha makes two cameo appearances.

Yamcha is the main subject of the spin-off manga Dragon Ball Side Story: The Case of Being Reincarnated as Yamcha (ドラゴンボール外伝 転生したらヤムチャだった件, Doragon Bōru Gaiden: Tensei-shitara Yamucha Datta Ken). Written and illustrated by Dragon Garow Lee, it is about a high school boy who, after an accident, wakes up in the body of Yamcha in the Dragon Ball manga. He trains as Yamcha to make him the strongest warrior, having known what happens to him later in the manga against the Saiyans.

Yamcha is a playable character in multiple Dragon Ball-related video games, including the Dragon Ball Z: Budokai series, the Dragon Ball Z: Budokai Tenkaichi series, and Dragon Ball FighterZ.

Yamcha also appears in an unofficial Taiwanese live-action remake of the first Dragon Ball feature film, played by Cheng Tung-Chuen. Here, he is known as Westwood. He joins Monkey Boy, Sparkle, Turtle Man, and Seeto in the quest to destroy King Horn and his powerful warriors. He was played by Korean pop singer Joon Park in the film Dragonball Evolution, for which James Kyson Lee also auditioned.

== Reception and legacy ==
Yamcha is one of the oldest protagonists in the Dragon Ball series. He is a skilled human martial artist in the Wolf Fang Fist style. While he is greatly outclassed by other fighters by the time Dragon Ball Z rolls around, he was a major presence and a fun and popular character in the original Dragon Ball series.

— Ryan Parreno from GameRanx

Yamcha has had mixed reviews during his inception. He is commonly described as useless and outclassed as a fighter in the Dragon Ball series yet has also been described as fun and an iconic anime character to other publishers. A few have noted that his most highlighted moments in the anime was in the original anime adaptation compared to the more popular Dragon Ball Z anime. In 2004, Japanese fans voted Yamcha the fifteenth most popular character of the series. He was ranked as the thirty-eighth greatest Dragon Ball Z character of all time by Complex describing his willing to sacrifice himself as being the best part of his character.

Yamcha is commonly joked about as one of the weaker fighters by fans of the series. When younger fans would belittle the character as weak, Krillin's voice actress Mayumi Tanaka said she would explain to them that Krillin and Yamcha are the strongest earthlings, the other characters are all aliens. Despite this, he has been used as a joke that appears in internet memes, T-shirts and action figures, especially regarding his initial death which has been described as "iconic" and is subject to many parodies and homages. So much so that online writers such as Moviepilot's Ak Khan Ten's described him as an "iconic troll legend". He felt that, despite being a weaker fighter, he still is an important character from the Dragon Ball mythos since the creation of the manga and felt that he deserves respect as "an iconic Dragon Ball character". He also described Yamcha as Goku's first real rival in the series. He also praised the revealing of him mastering the Spirit Ball technique and also him being the first one who realized that he should cut Goku's tail to stop Goku in ape form. Yamcha's initial death has inspired a phrase by fans on when somebody dies in the Dragon Ball universe as being "Yamcha'd". Yamcha's "death pose" was even referenced in the official Dragon Ball Super anime during the 2016 episode, "A Challenge From Champa! This Time, a Baseball Game!", in which Yamcha, during a baseball game between Universe 7 and 6, steals home base during a confrontation between God of Destruction Beerus and his brother, Champa. In the ensuing fight between the two Destroyers, Yamcha ends up wounded, lying face down in a crater in the same pose with his hand on home base. Krillin comments that this scene looks familiar.

Furuya, the character's voice actor, designates Yamcha as one of the characters by whom he was inspired to create his music, as well as one of the top six favorite characters he voiced. Rebecca Bundy of Anime News Network takes note of resemblance of scars between Yamcha and Kenshin Himura, but also observes that their meaning is quite different. Furuya has expressed dissatisfaction with the way Akira Toriyama handled his character on multiple occasions. The first was the way Yamcha was murdered by a Saibaman despite his constant training during the Saiyan Arc which made him a supporting character in following arcs. The second time he was shocked by Yamcha's development was when it was revealed that the character Trunks was Bulma's and Vegeta's child from the future. This was despite the fact that Yamcha and Bulma were often in a relationship, with Yamcha being portrayed as a cheater to necessitate this change. Hiromi Tsuru, Bulma's first Japanese actress, was also shocked by this change, believing her character would end up with Yamcha. This caused Furuya to protest against Toriyama, who said that Yamcha was always a cheater, and proceeded to laugh.

== Bibliography ==
- Dragon Ball manga, Volume 1 – ISBN 1-56931-920-0
- Dragon Ball manga, Volume 2 – ISBN 1-56931-921-9
- Dragon Ball manga, Volume 3 – ISBN 1-56931-922-7
- Dragon Ball manga, Volume 10 – ISBN 1-56931-848-4
- Dragon Ball manga, Volume 15 – ISBN 1-59116-297-1
- Dragon Ball manga, Volume 16 – ISBN 1-59116-457-5
- Dragon Ball Z manga, Volume 5 – ISBN 1-56931-934-0
- Dragon Ball Z manga, Volume 12 – ISBN 1-56931-985-5
- Dragon Ball Z manga, Volume 13 – ISBN 1-56931-986-3
- Dragon Ball Z manga, Volume 18 – ISBN 1-59116-637-3
- Dragon Ball Z manga, Volume 20 – ISBN 1-59116-808-2
- Dragon Ball Z manga, Volume 26 – ISBN 1-42150-636-X
