= Tien Shinhan =

Fictional character from Dragon Ball

- Dragon Ball character
- Tien Shinhan (right) with Goku, drawn by Akira Toriyama and digitally colored by Shueisha.
- First appearance: Dragon Ball chapter #113 The 22nd Tenkaichi Budōkai, February 24, 1987 (Weekly Shōnen Jump 1987)
- Created by: Akira Toriyama
- Voiced by: Japanese: Hirotaka Suzuoki; Kōichi Yamadera; Mitsuaki Madono; Hikaru Midorikawa; English: Chris Cason; John Burgmeier

In-universe information
- Species: Superhuman, Triclops
- Occupation: Farmer; Martial arts instructor
- Abilities: Super strength; Super speed, agility, reflexes; Stamina; Flight; Energy sensing; Energy projection; Energy absorption; Durability; Telepathy; Telekinesis; Multiplication

Tien Shinhan (Japanese: 天津飯, Hepburn: Tenshinhan), known as Tenshinhan in Japanese media and Viz Media's release of the manga, is a fictional character in the Dragon Ball franchise created by Akira Toriyama. He made his appearance in chapter #113 "The 22nd Tenkaichi Budōkai", first published in Weekly Shōnen Jump magazine on February 24, 1987, entering the World Martial Arts Tournament to defeat Son Goku and his fellow-students. However, he later teams up with them to defeat King Piccolo, accompanied by his best friend Chiaotzu. Tien becomes Goku's rival for a period and is notable for being the first person in the series to fly using Bukū-jutsu (舞空術; lit. 'Air Dance Technique') and to use the Taiyōken (太陽拳; lit. "Fist of the Sun", "Solar Flare" in Funimation's anime dub) technique.

The character of Tien has received praise from reviewers of manga and anime. They praised his quest for redemption in the King Piccolo arc, and his fights have been celebrated as dramatic, intense, and entertaining. Numerous pieces of merchandise have been released bearing his likeness, including action figures, key chains, and capsule toys.

== Design ==
The character is named after tenshindon, a chūka dish consisting of a crabmeat omelet over rice. Toriyama said that although Tien is strong and cool, he based his name on a well-known Chinese food just to be "silly." Tien is loosely based on Erlang Shen from Journey to the West, a three-eyed Taoist deity who first appears as an adversary of Sun Wukong, later becoming his ally and rival.

== Abilities ==
Tien Shinhan is one of the strongest humans on Earth in the series. Through training with Master Shen, he became superhuman, gaining super strength, speed, agility, reflexes, the ability to fly, with telepathy, telekinesis, generate energy from his very being called ki, produce energy blasts, absorb energy and energy blasts, control as well as sense energy around him and enhance his abilities by increasing his energy through force of will.

== Voice actors ==
Tien was voiced by Hirotaka Suzuoki in most media, except for episodes 82 and 84 of Dragon Ball Z, where he is voiced by Kōichi Yamadera. Suzuoki said that despite joining the cast while the show had already been in production for a while, it was easy for him to relax and find his place. After Suzuoki's death in 2006, Mitsuaki Madono voiced Tien in several video games such as Burst Limit and World's Greatest Adventure, before Hikaru Midorikawa took over the role for Dragon Ball Kai and all media since.

In the Funimation dub of the series, Tien is voiced by Chris Cason and John Burgmeier.

== Appearances ==
=== In Dragon Ball ===
Tien is introduced as the star pupil of Master Roshi's rival, Tsuru-Sen'nin (鶴仙人, lit. "Crane Sage"; "Master Shen" in Funimation's anime dub), who has him and Chiaotzu enter the Tenkaichi Budōkai to prove his students' superiority. He begins as an arrogant, but talented martial artist, antagonizing Goku, Krillin, and especially Yamcha. He first fights Yamcha in the tournament, whose leg he ruthlessly breaks to win. Upon learning that Goku killed Tao Pai Pai, the younger brother of Master Shen and a mentor of Tien's, he decides to kill Goku in revenge. He fights Master Roshi (disguised as Jackie Chun) in his next match, and Roshi shakes his resolve to kill Goku. In the final fight, he battles Goku and brutally beats him down early in the fight, before Goku uses his full power, making the fight more even. Chiaotzu interferes with the fight by using his psychic powers to paralyze Goku without Tien's knowledge or consent, but once Tien realizes that Chiaotzu is cheating, he defies his master and refuses to kill Goku. Tien wins the tournament after destroying the stage with the powerful but potentially life-threatening Kikōhō, and after abandoning Master Shen with Chiaotzu. Launch falls in love with him and asks him to live at Kame House with her and Roshi, but Tien refuses, saying that he does not want to live with the rival of his former master.

After the death of Krillin at the hands of King Piccolo, Tien and Chiaotzu offer to help Roshi in the search for the Dragon Balls. But when Chiaotzu and Roshi are both killed and Piccolo wishes for his youth, he learns the suicidal Mafūba technique to seal away King Piccolo. After Piccolo chooses to attack West City, Tien intercepts him despite knowing that he cannot be revived by the Dragon Balls, but must defeat Piccolo's strongest son Drum, first, having to be rescued by Goku. In the final battle against King Piccolo, Tien uses the last of his energy to save Goku from Piccolo's strongest attack, but is then taken hostage by Piccolo as he cripples Goku. After Goku kills Piccolo, he is taken by Yajirobe to be healed at Korin Tower, while Tien reunites with Bulma, Yamcha, and Launch, the latter of whom nurses him back to health. Tien participates in the next Tenkaichi Budōkai, where he fights the previously assumed dead Tao Pai Pai, who had been saved by cybernetics and wants revenge on both Tien, for turning his back on him and his brother, and Goku. Tien easily outmatches Tao Pai Pai, but does not want to humiliate his former master and tries to drag him out of the ring peacefully. Tao Pai Pai catches Tien by surprise and gives him a scar across his chest, which he retains for the rest of the series, before Tien defeats him with a single punch. Tien then fights Goku again in the semi-finals, is defeated, and later protects their allies from being caught up in Piccolo Jr.'s attacks during the final fight.

Tien prepares for training along with the other heroes at Kami's to fight the invading Saiyans. Tien manages to defeat a Saibaman, but when Chiaotzu sacrifices his life in a failed attempt to kill Nappa, he knowingly uses the last of his power attempting to kill Nappa, but fails. Along with Yamcha, Chiaotzu, and Piccolo, he goes to King Kai's planet to train under him in the afterlife. He is revived by the Dragon Balls and prepares to fight against the returning Frieza, before Future Trunks appears and beats them to it. He trains for the battle against the Androids, but does not bring Chiaotzu as he believes that he is not strong enough. He accompanies Piccolo and Goku to fight Android 20 and Android 19. He searches for Doctor Gero's hideout. After Androids 17 and 18 are released, he tries to fight them with Vegeta, Piccolo, and Trunks, but they are all defeated. He saves Android 18 and Android 16 from being absorbed by Cell and gives them time to escape by continuously attacking Cell (who had just easily defeated Piccolo and Android 16), expending all his energy and having to be rescued by Goku. He then participates in the battle against the Cell Jr.s. When Goku returns from the afterlife and asks where Tien is, Krillin says that he is not coming. However, after Majin Buu is released, Tien appears and saves, Gohan, Dende, and Mr. Satan from being killed by Buu. He fights Buu, but is unable to damage him, and is defeated by a single kick. He and Chiaotzu later contributed their energy for Goku's Genki Dama attack to defeat Buu once and for all.

In a filler episode of Dragon Ball Z, during the Saiyan arc, Tien trains for the Saiyans by fighting members of their race in the past using the Pendulum Room.

=== In Dragon Ball Super ===
In Dragon Ball Z: Battle of Gods, Tien, Android 18 and Piccolo attack Beerus after Buu angers him, the three being defeated; and in Dragon Ball Z: Resurrection 'F', Tien assists in the battle against the resurrected Frieza and his henchmen, being saved from death by Whis. The events of Battle of Gods and Resurrection 'F' have been adapted as the first two story arcs for the Dragon Ball Super anime, with Tien's role in the Super retelling of the story arcs relatively unchanged.

After these two events and beyond, Goku decides to recruit Tien for the Tournament of Power team for Universe 7, and learns that he and Chiaotzu have formed a martial arts dojo. Tien initially turns down Goku's request and works with Goku, Chiaotzu, and Master Roshi to reverse the brainwashing of his students by Yurin, a woman that Tien used to be classmates with during his time at Crane School, who had sworn revenge on him after he left and declined to fight with her. After Yurin brainwashes Master Roshi, the latter defeats Tien, who agrees to join the Tournament of Power as he believes the ten million Zeni falsely promised by Goku will help repair the village. Tien agrees to participate in a fight against Gohan and Piccolo with Goku, calling off the match after Piccolo destroys the mountain fighting stage. Tien is part of the group that adheres to Gohan's plan of remaining together and later fights Universe 2's Harmira, using his multiplication technique to give himself time against Harmira. Three of Tien's four clones are defeated by Harmira, who shoots the ground from underneath Tien to knock him off stage, and is grabbed by Tien's three other clones, eliminating them both from the tournament.

=== In other media ===
Tien appears in two non-canon Dragon Ball Z movies; in the third, Tien battles the henchmen of Turles; in the ninth, Tien is involved with an intergalactic tournament and helps Gohan with Bojack's minions.

He makes very brief appearances in Dragon Ball GT, the anime-only sequel to the series.

Tien appears in most Dragon Ball games. In the 2003 game Dragon Ball Z: Budokai 2, Tien and Yamcha can be absorbed by Majin Buu to create a form exclusive to the game. In the 2009 game Dragon Ball: Raging Blast, Chiaotzu is told by Burter and Jeice that he drags Tien down, the latter arriving during Chiaotzu's fight with the pair and defeating them both, Tien afterward asserting that the duo's claim was false. The two are subsequently challenged by Goten and Trunks, who fuse into Gotenks, and Goku and Vegeta, defeating both pairs to assert themselves as the best tag team. In the 2018 game Dragon Ball FighterZ, Tien is guarded by Chiaotzu while the two are approached by clones until Goku and Krillin arrive. After Krillin explains the situation, Tien states his intent to fight alongside them against the clones and agrees to Chiaotzu's help on the condition that he does not leave his side. After Android 21 follows the heroes to the Kaioshin planet, Tien uses the Neo Tri-Beam to aid in destroying her.

He is referenced by American rapper Soulja Boy in the uncut version of his song "Goku", where he states that he "feels like Tien" along with other Dragon Ball characters and Pikachu.

== Reception ==
Tien is a popular character in the series, in 2004 fans of the series voted him the sixteenth most popular character for the book Dragon Ball Forever. Tien's voice actor for the original broadcast, Hirotaka Suzuoki, said despite the character not being an ordinary human, the character's interactions with Chiaotzu showed his humanity. Tien has received both praise and criticism from numerous publications. Theron Martin of Anime News Network stated that it was 'fun' seeing the groundwork for Tien being laid and reflecting on how he later changed. Martin went on to say that Goku's fight with Tien "presents the most dramatic and intense duel to date in the series." Davey C. Jones of Active Anime noted that "Tien's redemption made an interesting side story" and that it was "crucial in the final episodes" of the King Piccolo arc.

Chris Beveridge of Mania Entertainment commented on episodes 62–92 of Dragon Ball, saying, "There are some dull moments to be had, especially as I don't find Tien or Chaozu to be interesting characters." However he went on to say that Tien's fight with Goku "was really quite good" and expressed mixed feelings about the character, saying that as a villain "he was fairly one dimensional." But after being influenced by Master Roshi's teachings, Beveridge said, he "becomes a much more interesting character" and was disappointed that he did not have a really "strong story told for him after this series." Sean Connolly of the same site said that Tien "shows his worth" by holding off Cell "with a flurry of high powered attacks." ANN's D.F. Smith said that Tien's fight against King Piccolo's minions was entertaining, but the conclusion of his fight against Goku was random.
