= Dragon Ball Z: Budokai 2 =

2003 video game

- European cover art
- Developer: Dimps (Note: Ported to GameCube by Pyramid, Inc.)
- Publishers: JP/EU: Bandai; NA/AU: Atari
- Series: Dragon Ball; Budokai
- Platforms: PlayStation 2, GameCube
- Release: PlayStation 2: EU: November 14, 2003; AU: November 23, 2003; NA: December 4, 2003; JP: February 5, 2004; GameCube: NA: December 15, 2004; EU: March 18, 2005; AU: April 8, 2005
- Genre: Fighting
- Modes: Single-player, multiplayer

Dragon Ball Z: Budokai 2, released as Dragon Ball Z2 (ドラゴンボールZ2, Doragon Bōru Zetto Tsū) in Japan, is a fighting video game developed by Dimps based upon the anime and manga series, Dragon Ball Z, and a sequel to Dragon Ball Z: Budokai. It released for the PlayStation 2 in 2003 and for the GameCube in 2004 and was published in Japan and Europe by Bandai and in North America, Australia and South Africa by Atari SA.

== Gameplay ==
The World Tournament allows players to compete against up to 8 players in a Martial Arts Tournament. If more than one human player is present no prize money is available, but with only one human player prizes can be won. Dueling mode allows a player to fight the computer at a preset skill level, or two human players to fight each other using any custom skills. A player may also watch a fight between two computer fighters.

Made up of three sections, the Skill Shop, character editing, and instructions. A player may edit skills on either memory card. Aside from Dragon World, the Skill Shop is the place to get your skill capsules. Bulma will wear a different costume depending on how many the player has collected in Dragon World.

Each character has a Health bar, and a Ki bar. When the health runs out, the character loses (as in most fighting games). Ki is required to perform special moves, and Ki blasts. Characters can dodge attacks. There are varying mechanics for ultimate moves, some will automatically work upon their execution, some require a button input within a certain timeframe, some require rotating the control stick to build power, and some require both players to rotate control sticks in a struggle.

== Development and release ==
In Japan, 2,000 V-Jump readers were able to get Dragon Ball Z2V, a revamped version of the game.

== Reception ==
Reception

Aggregate score
| Aggregator | Score | |
| Aggregator | GameCube | PS2 |
|---|---|---|
| Metacritic | 66/100 | 66/100 |

Review scores
| Publication | Score | |
| Publication | GameCube | PS2 |
|---|---|---|
| Game Informer | N/A | 7.5/10 |
| GamePro | 2.5/5 | 3/5 |
| GameSpot | 6.6/10 | 6.7/10 |
| GameSpy | 3/5 | 2/5 |
| GameZone | N/A | 7.3/10 |
| IGN | 7.5/10 | 7.4/10 |
| Jeuxvideo.com | 14/20 | 14/20 |
| Official U.S. PlayStation Magazine | N/A | 6/10 |

In Japan, Dragon Ball Z 2 sold 584,183 copies. In the United States, Budokai 2 sold 1.5 million copies and was the fourth top video game rental of 2004. The game sold a total of 2,084,183 copies in Japan and the United States.

Both version have an aggregate score of 66/100 on Metacritic. GameSpot, who gave the game a score of 6.7/10, commented that, "The improved visuals are nice, and some of the additions made to the fighting system are fun, but Budokai 2 still comes out as an underwhelming sequel."

During the 7th Annual Interactive Achievement Awards, the Academy of Interactive Arts & Sciences nominated Budokai 2 for "Console Fighting Game of the Year", which was ultimately given to Soulcalibur II.
