= Cell (Dragon Ball) =

Fictional character from Dragon Ball

- Dragon Ball character
- Cell's transformations/forms as drawn by Akira Toriyama; Imperfect (left), Semi-Perfect (middle) and Perfect/Super Perfect (right)
- First appearance: Dragon Ball chapter #361 The Mysterious Monster, Finally Appears!!, 16 February 1992 (Weekly Shōnen Jump 1992)
- Created by: Akira Toriyama
- Voiced by: Japanese: Norio Wakamoto; English: Dameon Clarke (Funimation dub); Dale Wilson (Ocean dub); Jonathan Cook (GT: Final Bout); Christopher Sabat (Supersonic Warriors 2); Ben Jeffery (Blue Water dub of GT); Travis Willingham (2009–2014); Jim Foronda (Kai: The Final Chapters)

In-universe information
- Race: Bio Android
- Family: Dr. Gero (creator)
- Children: Cell Juniors
- Abilities: Super strength; Super speed, agility, Reflexes; Stamina; Healing; Flight; Energy sensing; Energy projection; Energy absorption; Durability; Telepathy; Telekinesis; Teleportation; Size Expansion; Multiplication

Cell (Japanese: セル, Hepburn: Seru), later known as Semi-Perfect Cell, Perfect Cell, and Super Perfect Cell, is a fictional character and antagonist in the Dragon Ball manga series created by Akira Toriyama. He made his debut in chapter #361, "The Mysterious Monster, Finally Appears!!", first published in Weekly Shōnen Jump on 16 February 1992.

Created by Doctor Gero, a main member of the Red Ribbon Army, Cell is an evil artificial life form created using the DNA and cells from several significant strong characters in the series. He travels back in time from an alternate timeline to become a perfect being and defeat Goku.

== Creation and conception ==
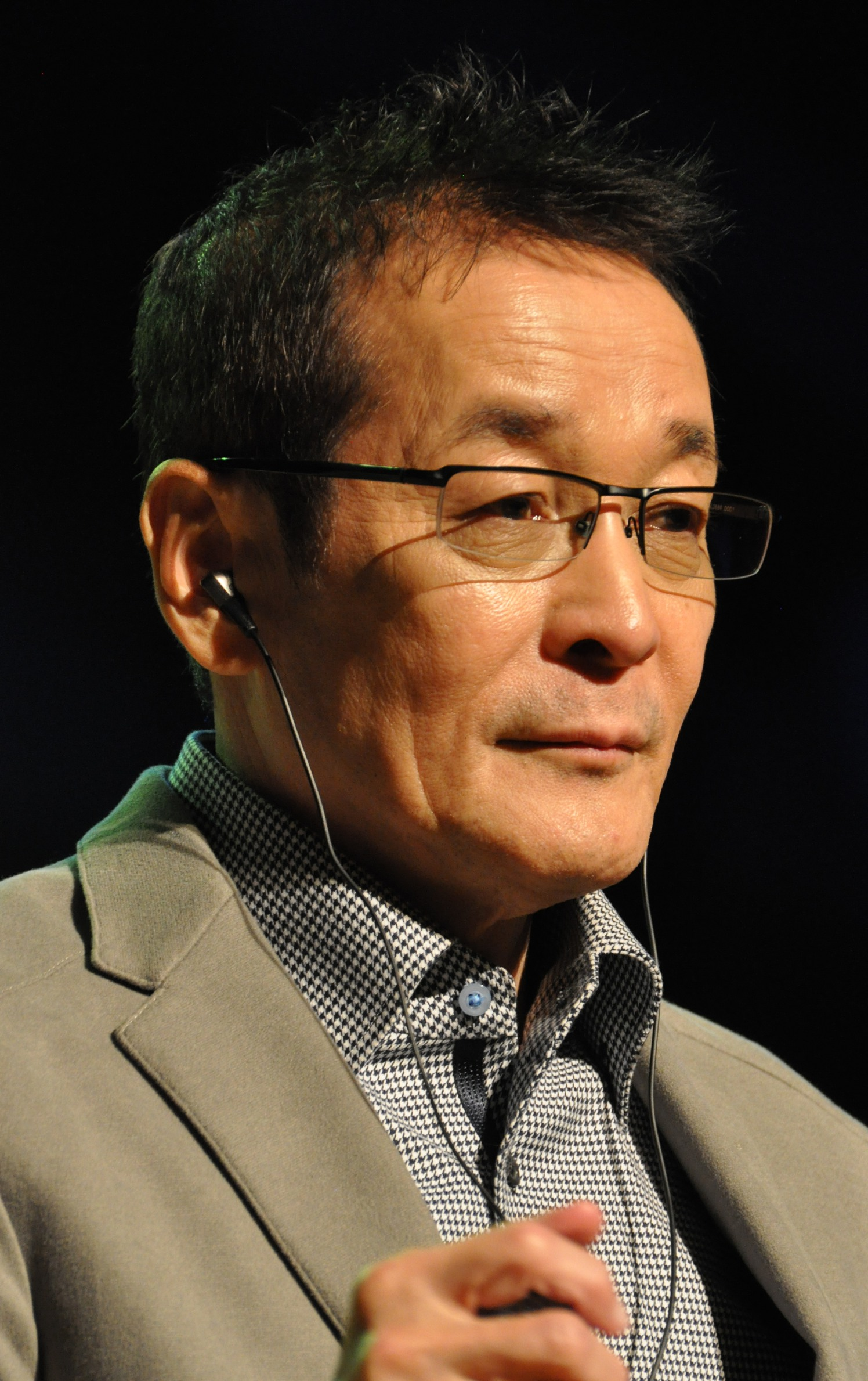
Norio Wakamoto has been Cell's Japanese voice actor in every single piece of Dragon Ball media.

After Kazuhiko Torishima, Toriyama's former editor during Dr. Slump and early Dragon Ball, expressed dissatisfaction with first Androids #19 and #20 and later Androids #17 and #18 as villains, Toriyama created Cell. Toriyama has expressed some kind of regret regarding the design of Cell, calling it tedious to draw all the little spots on his body. In addition, he did not initially plan for the character to be able to transform, but gave him this ability after his then-current editor Yū Kondō described Cell as "ugly." Toriyama intended for Cell's second form to last longer than it did; Kondō found the form to be silly and urged him to hasten the first appearance of the next transformation.

Norio Wakamoto is the Japanese voice of Cell and revealed that when he voiced the forms of Cell, the first form was monster-like, he used a raspy voice which he said was a pain. He toned it down for the second, and by the final form, he was able to perform comfortably.

In the English Funimation dub, Cell is voiced by Dameon Clarke. Clarke considers Cell one of his more "fun and entertaining" characters. Clarke said that he based the voice of Perfect Cell off of Terence Stamp's General Zod from Superman II. Sometime around the release of Resurrection 'F', in which Frieza returned, Clarke said he began receiving questions about a film featuring Cell's return, which he supported.

== Abilities ==
Thanks to being genetically created from the DNA of several of the Z-Fighters (specifically Goku, Vegeta, and Piccolo), as well as the villain Frieza and his father King Cold, being spliced together; Cell has the superhuman abilities of all the aforementioned characters. What makes him distinct from other Android models is the ability to generate, manipulate, and strengthen himself with a life energy called ki very similar to most naturally-born organic users of it. He also can mask his presence to avoid detection and can generate an aura similar to a Super Saiyan. Along with telepathy and telekinesis, Cell knows how to use the special attacks the Z-Fighters use, such as the Kamehameha and the Solar Flare. Cell is specifically designed to continuously evolve by absorbing Androids #17 and #18 to achieve his final and most powerful stage, with each form gaining monstrous boosts in overall physical strength, durability, and speed. He can also increase his power by using his tail to absorb bio-energy from any living creature.

Due to the Saiyan cells embedded in his being, Cell is able to imprint on a near-death experience and grow stronger, while memorizing new techniques at his disposal, such as Goku's teleportation move referred to as Instant Transmission.

== Appearances ==
=== Dragon Ball Z ===
Cell is an artificial life form (referred to as a "Bio-Android") created by Doctor Gero's supercomputer from cell samples of the universe's strongest warriors, possessing the genetic information of Goku, Vegeta, Piccolo, King Cold, and Frieza in an underground complex beneath Gero's secret laboratory. The Cell that appears as the primary antagonist of his titular arc is from the future, awakening after his development is complete to find that the Androids have been destroyed by Trunks. After he kills Trunks, Cell uses his time machine while regressing into an egg to travel back to before the androids appeared, waiting four years until the present timeline. After hatching and metamorphosing from his larval, cicada-like form into his insect-like Imperfect form, Cell kills off thousands of people and absorbs them to increase his power in preparation to absorb the Androids. After he has managed to absorb the energy of entire cities of people, Cell finds Android #17 during his fight with Piccolo. Cell then breaks Piccolo's neck before Android #16 holds the mechanized villain off. However, he eventually finds an opportunity to absorb #17 and evolve into Semi-Perfect Cell. Cell quickly dispatches #16, but he is unable to absorb #18 thanks to the intervention of Tien Shinhan, who holds him back at the cost of his life force before being rescued by Goku, along with a surviving Piccolo.

Cell tries to find Android #18, destroying islands to intimidate her into showing herself, but before he can destroy the island that #18 is hiding on, Vegeta appears and overwhelms him with newfound power. At the brink of defeat, Cell talks Vegeta into letting him absorb Android #18 so he can give him a better fight, and upon doing so, he assumes his final form, which is much more human-like. In this form, Cell easily defeats Krillin, Vegeta, and Trunks, but spares all of them so that they can come to his fighting tournament, the Cell Games (セルゲーム, Seru Gēmu) to find a worthy opponent to face him, intending to destroy Earth when he wins and wanting to enjoy the fear he causes in others.

A week later, in the first round of the Cell Games, he quickly defeats Mr. Satan before moving onto Goku, who quits upon realizing Cell is stronger than him. Goku then nominates his son, Gohan, as Cell's next opponent, to everyone's surprise. Though Gohan puts up a good fight and proves himself his father's superior, Cell takes the upper hand due to Gohan's pacifistic nature. Wanting to avoid killing Cell if he can help it, Gohan warns Cell that if he is pushed too far, he will lose control of his anger and kill him, which only drives Cell to torment him further, excited to see this power. He spawns Cell Juniors (セルジュニア, Seru Junia), miniature versions of himself who begin to fight the heroes, causing Gohan's rage to slowly swell. It is only when Cell mercilessly kills #16 after he had encouraged Gohan to fight that Gohan snaps, transforming into a Super Saiyan 2. Gohan effortlessly and violently kills all the Cell Juniors and then proceeds to overpower Cell himself, aiming to prolong his suffering, dealing so much damage that Cell regurgitates Android #18 and reverts to his previous form. In desperation, Cell tries to self-destruct and destroy the Earth, but Goku sacrifices himself by using his Instant Transmission technique to teleport himself and Cell to King Kai's planet, where Cell explodes, killing everyone there.

Cell, however, survives thanks to his unique physiology, which allows him to regenerate from a special nucleus in his head and grow more powerful whenever he has almost been killed, returning to his Perfect form even stronger than before. He quickly kills Trunks, and when Vegeta attacks him in retaliation, easily swats him aside. Cell tries to kill Vegeta with an energy blast, but Gohan takes the blast in his place, injuring his arm. With victory in his grasp, Cell decides to destroy the planet with one last Kamehameha, claiming he has the power to destroy the entire Solar System. Assisted by his father in spirit, Gohan retaliates with his own Kamehameha, ultimately overpowering Cell with Vegeta's help, destroying his cell nucleus and killing him once and for all. Mr. Satan, however, takes credit for the victory and becomes a hero.

Upon being resurrected by the Dragon Balls and returning to the future, Trunks destroys Androids #17 and #18. Afterward, he realizes from his previous travels that Cell is likely to emerge soon. Three years later, Trunks is confronted by the Cell of his timeline, who plans to kill Trunks and use his time machine in the same way his alternate self had. This Cell knew that Trunks had traveled back and learned of him in the past, but still believes himself more powerful than Trunks. However, Trunks showcases his newfound power and quickly dispatches him, finally bringing peace to his part of the timeline.

In later episodes of the anime, Cell makes numerous cameo appearances, usually as comic relief. In his posthumous appearances, he is shown causing trouble in Hell along with Frieza, King Cold, and the Ginyu Force. He is defeated by Goku and Pikkon and sent to prison and is later seen watching Goku's battle with Majin Buu on a crystal ball, openly wondering why Goku quit against him and then went on to fight Buu, whom he acknowledges to be a stronger opponent than himself.

=== Dragon Ball Super ===
A few years later, when Trunks travels back to the past again, Trunks reacts in confusion to seeing Goku alive as he remembers his death from Cell's self-destructing. Goku informs him of his resurrection that occurred after Trunks had returned to his time. Not long after, Bulma is revealed to have retained the Time Capsule that Cell had stolen from Trunks to return to the present timeline. Cell is remembered by Trunks when he notes the differences between Gohan as a child, in particular when he fought Cell, and him as an adult upon meeting him for the first time in years. An illusion of Cell appears in the Forest of Fear to Krillin and Goku, attacking the pair and growing in size before Krillin concentrates and dispels the illusion by confronting his fear.

Although the original Cell does not appear in the film Dragon Ball Super: Super Hero, his schematics were used by the revived Red Ribbon Army to create a stronger model designated as "Cell Max", a red-armored variant of Cell's Semi-Perfect form that lacks the original Cell's ability to regenerate. Serving as the film's final antagonist, he was activated by a desperate Magenta before his mind was fully developed, coming across as a mindless, rampaging monster.

=== In other media ===
In Dragon Ball GT, after Goku is sent to Hell by accident, he confronts both Cell and Frieza, whose bodies have been rendered temporarily immortal due to the upset in the balance between the two worlds. Though Cell and Frieza trap Goku with their new joint attack and freeze him using a witch below them, they too are frozen after venturing down to gloat at him, and due to being dead, are unable to thaw out as Goku did. Goku accidentally breaks the ice Cell and Frieza are trapped within, in pieces, implying that Cell and Frieza have been erased from existence. However, in a future scene, Frieza and Cell are seen being taken away in a jail cell with tape over their mouths. Cell and Frieza also appear in the GT live-action show, with new forms.

Cell appears in a TV ad for Dragon Ball Z: Battle of Gods, questioning why he is not in the film while Frieza brags that he is, Cell then remarks that Frieza only has a non-speaking appearance.

Cell appears in TeamFourStar's Dragon Ball Z Abridged, voiced by Curtis "Takahata101" Arnott.

==== Video games ====
Cell appears in several video games as a boss and playable character, most notably the Budokai, Budokai Tenkaichi and Raging Blast series. He is also a playable character in the Dragon Ball Z: Collectible Card Game. In several games, Cell has forms that have been created specifically for the installment.

In the 1995 game Dragon Ball Z: Super Battle, after Goku defeats Cell, he gives him a Senzu Bean and allows him to live. Cell responds by promising to return and win.

In Budokai, Cell has a nightmare where he accidentally absorbs Krillin and becomes Cellin (セルリン, Serurin), with the form leaving him weaker. In the 2003 game Dragon Ball Z: Budokai 2, Cell is revived by Bobbidi and becomes a Majin, his appearance being altered with the letter "M" on his forehead alongside black lining appearing under his eyes. This form is short-lived, as Majin Buu terminates Bobbidi, and absorbs Cell shortly afterward.

In the 2005 video game Budokai Tenkaichi, Cell defeats Gohan and confronts Super 17, defeating him when the two fight over a shared interest in killing Goku.

In the 2015 game Dragon Ball: Xenoverse, Cell appears as a mentor for the player, teaching the Perfect Kamehameha, Perfect Shot, All Clear and Gravity Impact to the player. Within the context of the game's story mode, Cell defeats Gohan until the player intervenes in their fight, and the version of the character from Trunks' timeline reaches his Perfect form thanks to Towa's strengthening, though he is destroyed by the player and Trunks.

In the 2016 game Dragon Ball Xenoverse 2, Cell shows up in his Perfect Form and fights Trunks, also meeting Android 16 for the first time and fighting alongside him. Cell reaches his Perfect form after defeating both Piccolo and #16, then absorbing #17 and #18 at the same time. When an empowered Android #17 fights Piccolo, Trunks warns the player that Cell succeeding in absorbing this version of #17 would mean an even larger power boost than in the main timeline. Cell himself shows up empowered, easily defeating Android #16. Cell later fights alongside the corrupted Cell Juniors, and welcomes Metal Cooler to the Cell Games.

In the 2018 game Dragon Ball FighterZ, Cell defeats Android 18 and is confronted by Goku and Krillin while aiming a beam at her and Android 21. After being defeated, Cell uses the Solar Flare to escape. Cell laments his lack of power before being confronted by Frieza, who offers him a deal where the two share information with each other. The player then controls Cell after Goku is shot by Android 21, and fights Android 21 with Cell. Cell escapes from Android 21 with another Solar Flare, and the player returns to Goku from the strain on Cell's body

Cell is also a playable character in the crossover fighting games Battle Stadium D.O.N. and Jump Force, as well as a supporting character in Jump Ultimate Stars.

In Dragon Ball: Sparking! Zero, Cell appears with several playable forms each with unique special attacks.

== Reception ==
In 2004, fans of the series voted Cell the fourteenth most popular character for a poll in the book Dragon Ball Forever. In 2015, Jacob Yothment ranked Cell No. 3 on his list Top 10 Villains of the Dragon Ball Franchise, Shawn Saris of IGN ranked Cell No. 7 on the list Top 13 Dragon Ball Z Characters, and Otakukart.com ranked Cell No. 2 on the list Top 10 Dragon Ball Villains. In 2016, Cell was ranked No. 6 on the saikoplus.com list 10 Most Popular Characters in Dragon Ball Z. Casandra Ronning wrote that Cell differed from Frieza in being "adaptable and strategic, playing off his opponent's weakness to further his goals" and in reference to his genetic ties to the heroes and narrative ties to earlier parts of the series, called him "a villain born from their victories."

Michael Zupan assessed Cell as the Dragon Ball villain with the most buildup, writing, "The Z Fighters throw everything they have at this character, and just when you think he's beat... he transforms into something more powerful." Dennis Amith of J!-ENT described Cell as "the toughest enemy that the team has fought yet" and liked how the efforts of the other characters trying to stop Cell is the main focus of that part of the series. J. Steiff and T. D. Tamplin used Cell as an example of the concept of "leveling up" in anime and believed Cell follows this concept well.

Emma Singer noted that Cell "undercuts his own mystique by explaining most of his story to Piccolo" and called him "both the most dull of DBZ's main antagonists, and the first of many villains in the franchise to have regeneration, negating tension in combat." The concept of the Cell Games and its execution were criticized. D. F. Smith of IGN criticized Cell's decision to hold a fighting tournament instead of destroying Earth as a sign that the author has run out of ideas. Reviewer Josh Begley had disapproval toward the tournament as he believed it would feature "endless fighting and no real plot progression." Luke Ryan Baldock took issue with the tournament based season for its lack of plot and high amount of action.

== See also ==
- Xenobot
