= Trunks (Dragon Ball) =

Fictional character from Dragon Ball

- Dragon Ball character
- Future Trunks, as drawn by Akira Toriyama
- First appearance: Dragon Ball chapter #331 The Young Boy of Mystery, 2 July 1991 (Weekly Shōnen Jump 1991)
- Created by: Akira Toriyama
- Voiced by: Japanese: Takeshi Kusao; Tsubasa Yonaga (Mini; Dragon Ball Daima); English: See Voice actors

In-universe information
- Species: Saiyan/human hybrid
- Family: Vegeta (father); Bulma (mother); Bulla (younger sister; present timeline)
- Relatives: King Vegeta III (paternal grandfather); Tarble (uncle); Dr. Brief (maternal grandfather); Bikini (maternal grandmother); Tights (aunt)
- Abilities: Superhuman strength, speed, agility, reflexes, durability, endurance, stamina and healing, flight, energy sensing, energy projection, energy absorption, telepathy, telekinesis

Trunks (Japanese: トランクス, Hepburn: Torankusu) is a fictional character in the Dragon Ball manga series created by Akira Toriyama. Within the series, he is the half-Saiyan half-human son of Vegeta and Bulma and has at least two noteworthy incarnations. Trunks makes his debut appearance in chapter #331 "The Young Boy of Mystery", first published in Weekly Shōnen Jump magazine on July 2, 1991, as an unidentified young man who traveled back in time to warn Son Goku and his allies of a deadly new enemy, the Androids of the Red Ribbon Army. This alternate future timeline incarnation of Trunks, who is usually referred to as "Future Trunks" (未来のトランクス, Mirai no Torankusu; "Trunks of the Future") in media to distinguish him from his present-timeline counterpart, is one of the Dragon Ball series' most popular characters and has been praised for his unique role within the series.

The present-timeline incarnation of Trunks is introduced as an infant during the Cell/Android arc, which features the first appearance of the Red Ribbon Androids. This version of Trunks makes recurring appearances as a major character in the Dragon Ball Z, Dragon Ball Super, and various other media such as Dragon Ball GT and films produced by Toei Animation.

== Voice actors ==
In the original Japanese version of the entire Dragon Ball Z anime series and in all other media, Trunks is voiced by Takeshi Kusao with the only exception being in Dragon Ball Daima, where a mini Trunks was voiced by Tsubasa Yonaga. Akira Toriyama stated that it was difficult to decide on Present Trunks' voice. The producer at Toei Animation and the editorial department discussed that, perhaps, it would be better if they changed to a different voice actor for the child version. At that time, the serialization was still going on, and Toriyama did not know how the manga story would end; young Trunks might have ended up growing up, and the story might have continued to the same period when teenage Trunks returned to the future. In that case, if the voice actor had been changed, it would have sounded strange. Eventually, Kusao ended up also voicing Trunks as a child and, after listening a few times, Toriyama felt that it was the right choice. However, the cries given by the character's infant form were provided by Hiromi Tsuru in an uncredited role.

In the English-language dub by Funimation, Eric Vale voices Trunks as both a teen and an adult in all Dragon Ball media, while Laura Bailey voices him as a child in the series, as well as the movie, Dragon Ball Z: Battle of Gods, as well as the other non-canon movies. Alexis Tipton voices him as a child starting from Dragon Ball Super. In the alternate Ocean Group dub of DBZ, Trunks was voiced by Alistair Abell (Teen & Adult) and Cathy Weseluck (Child).

== Abilities ==
Trunks possesses several Saiyan abilities, including superhuman strength, speed, reflexes, and energy blasts, which can be utilized by the use of ki. Both incarnations of Trunks have access to the Super Saiyan transformation, although their achievement of this form differs between incarnations. Future Trunks achieved this in his early teens, while present Trunks would be shown to have the ability at the age of eight.

Some of Future Trunks' signature attacks are the Burning Attack (バーニングアタック, Bāningu Atakku) and the Super Buster Cannon (スーパーバスターキャノン, Sūpā Basutā Kyanon). Trunks is also known for his use of a longsword that he keeps in a scabbard mounted across his back. His main means of conveyance is a technique called Bukū-jutsu (舞空術; "Air Dance Technique"), which gives him the ability of flight. However, Trunks does not rely on this technique as his only conveyance as he can also be seen piloting various crafts manufactured by his family's company, including the time machine which allowed him to visit Goku in the past. Unlike his present time counterpart, Future Trunks obtains two additional grades of Super Saiyan during his training with Vegeta in the Room of Spirit and Time. Unfortunately, these forms would greatly increase his ki consumption and greatly decrease his speed at the cost of additional strength, resulting in Future Trunks abandoning these grades after his initial fight with Cell. Upon his return to the past, Trunks can attain Super Saiyan 2 and can now also use his father's signature techniques, such as the Galick Gun and Final Flash. Later, when Black and Zamasu blame him for his constant time traveling, it fuels Trunks' rage and lets him transform into a new, previously unknown form named Super Saiyan Rage (超サイヤ人怒り, Sūpā Saiya-jin Ikari) and gives him enough power to fight both Black and Zamasu.

The present incarnation of Trunks can temporarily fuse with Goten to become the powerful being named Gotenks (ゴテンクス, Gotenkusu) through a technique called Fusion, which was taught to them by Goku. Gotenks can use a variety of attacks that he gives humorous names to, such as Galactic Donut (ギャラクティカドーナツ, Gyarakutuka Dōnatsu) and his signature Super Ghost Kamikaze Attack (スーパーゴーストカミカゼアタック, Sūpā Gōsuto Kamikaze Atakku). They can also achieve Super Saiyan 3 with ease, a feat that was very difficult for Goku to achieve and maintain.

== Appearances ==
=== Future Trunks ===
Trunks first appears in chapter #331 The Young Boy of Mystery (謎の少年, Nazo no Shōnen), published in Weekly Shōnen Jump magazine on July 15, 1991. Here he is a mysterious seventeen year old capable of transforming into the Super Saiyan state, who appears and singlehandedly kills Frieza and his father, King Cold. Upon Goku's return from Planet Yardrat, Trunks confides in Goku his tragic story.

As told in the stand-alone manga side story Trunks: The Story – The Lone Warrior (TRUNKS THE STORY －たったひとりの戦士－, Torankusu za Sutōrī -Tatta Hitori no Senshi-) and chapters #419 and 420, Trunks has traveled from twenty years in the future where the world is in constant ruin due to the terror of the two androids #17 and #18 which were created by Doctor Gero, the former chief scientist of the Red Ribbon Army. By this time, Goku has succumbed to an unknown heart virus, and everyone, except for Goku's son Gohan, has fallen at the hands of the artificial humans. Trunks has been living with Bulma and secretly training with his master Gohan. After an unsuccessful ambush, Gohan is murdered by the Androids. When Trunks finds the body, he becomes engulfed in rage and sadness, awakening his Super Saiyan transformation. After Gohan's death, Trunks assumes the mantle of Earth's sole protector against the artificial humans for the next three years until Bulma finishes her time machine. Once he informs Goku of the events to come, Trunks gives Goku a special medicine and returns to his own time.

Trunks returns to help in the present-day battle against the artificial humans, only to learn that his actions only affected the present timeline with a new future, while his own timeline remains unaffected. With the appearance of Cell from another alternate timeline, Trunks trains with Vegeta in the Room of Spirit and Time. After Vegeta's defeat, Trunks fights Cell in his newly gained Perfect form before conceding once learning his new Super Saiyan form proves to be ineffective. He later participates in Cell's martial arts tournament, where he is killed by Cell. After Trunks is revived by the Dragon Balls following Cell's defeat, he returns to his own timeline to defeat both the Androids and later the Cell of his time. A few years later, Trunks is accosted by the Supreme Kai of Universe 7, whom he helps in defeating Babidi and Dabura to prevent the revival of Majin Buu.

Years later, having reached Super Saiyan 2 during his fight against Badidi and Dabura, Trunks encounters a new dark enemy known as Goku Black, who slaughters the Earth's residents as the Saiyan survivor helps the survivors defend themselves, before attempting to recruit Goku and Vegeta from the present timeline. During Goku and Goku Black's fight, Trunks' time machine is destroyed, leaving him stuck in the present era, until Bulma rebuilds a new one. After a reunion with a now adult Gohan, Trunks becomes encouraged to defeat Goku Black for the people of his own timeline to have a chance at that same happiness, also having a reunion with a reformed Android #18. Trunks then receives training from Vegeta, vowing to surpass both his father and Goku Black in strength. After Beerus erased Zamasu in the present timeline, Trunks would later learn that Goku Black is a rogue Supreme Kai named Zamasu from an unaltered present timeline who acquired Goku's body and allied himself with the future timeline's Zamasu. During the battle, both versions of Zamasu provoke Trunks into his Super Saiyan Rage form by telling him that his meddling in time is the cause of their actions. After numerous fights, including Goku Black and Zamasu fusing with the Potara earrings, Trunks gathers the energy from all remaining life on the planet into his sword into the Spirit Bomb Sword, and cuts Fusion Zamasu in half. Despite losing his body, Zamasu's essence began to envelop the entire universe before being destroyed alongside the entire multiverse by that timeline's version of Zeno. Trunks and the others retreat to the past. Goku later invited Trunks to get Future Zeno. The two go back, with Trunks and Mai bidding their farewells as they live in a new future timeline where Zamasu's actions never occurred, that is home to another Mai and another Trunks.

=== Present Trunks ===
Trunks' second incarnation first appears as an infant in chapter #337 Super Warriors Assemble (集う超戦士たち, Tsudō Super Senshi-tachi), published on August 26, 1991. He is only featured as a background character. When he is eight, Trunks participates in the 25th Tenkaichi Budokai (天下一武道会; lit. 'Strongest Under the Heavens Martial Arts Tournament') and defeats Son Goten in the junior division, although the two of them cheated equally. Goten is his best friend and childhood rival, though Trunks is stronger and older than Goten as it is later pointed out by Goku. Eager to compete in the adult division, Trunks and Goten together impersonate another competitor, Mighty Mask (マイティマスク, Maiti Masuku) and are pitted against Android #18 and others in the Tenkaichi Budokai. But they are disqualified when #18 figures out the ruse and blows their cover, revealing that they are really two people.

Upon the arrival of Majin Buu, Trunks is forced to train with Goten in the Room of Spirit and Time to become the fused warrior Gotenks. Gotenks fights Buu, first in the time dimension, then in the real world until the thirty-minute fusion time limit expires. Through Buu's treachery, they, along with Piccolo, are absorbed by Buu, thus increasing his power. Once freed, Trunks, along with Goten, Gohan, and Piccolo, are killed when Buu blows up the Earth. After being resurrected, Trunks helped to rally the people on Earth to support Goku's Genki-Dama in his defeat of Majin Buu. At the end of the series, Trunks, now grown up, participates in the 28th Tenkaichi Budokai against the fighter Otokosuki.

Trunks appears in Dragon Ball Super, which chronologically takes place before the ending of Dragon Ball Z, as a recurring support character. He is usually paired with Goten and is often used as comic relief. He then meets his future counterpart in person for the first time during the Goku Black arc, having interacted with him beforehand as an infant. In the Universe Survival arc, Trunks and Goten are stopped from taking part in the Tournament of Power, and instead instructed to look after Android 17's haven for animals so that he can aid Goku in the tournament.

He, alongside Goten, both grown up, appear in Dragon Ball Super: Super Hero, assisting Gohan, Piccolo, and their friends in combating the revived Red Ribbon Army. Gotenks also appears, albeit in the obese state, due to the duo doing the fusion technique wrong.

=== Appearances in other media ===
In Dragon Ball GT, Trunks' second incarnation has become the President of Capsule Corporation, but does not take the job seriously. He accompanies Goku and Pan into space to recover the Black Star Dragon Balls. They have many strange encounters and meet many unusual characters, including the robot named Giru, who would act as the gang's Dragon Radar. Upon arriving on Giru's home world, the trio are hijacked by Dr. Myu's robots, and Trunks is solidified in living metal for study. Although the contents of the plate were not really Trunks, but a cleverly made decoy by both Trunks and Giru. Trunks uses the opportunity to uncover Dr. Myu's plan, which is to awaken Baby, and sabotage the process. Trunks' plan fails as Baby had managed to escape to Earth. When they return home, Baby has managed to possess Vegeta and brainwash everyone else into becoming his followers. Shortly after arriving, Trunks also falls victim to Baby's mind control and battles Goku. Later, he, along with Goten, travels the globe fighting the villains that escape from Hell.

Trunks also appears in the promotional anime for Super Dragon Ball Heroes, as Xeno Trunks. Xeno Trunks can use the Super Saiyan God transformation using God Ki.

Both incarnations of Trunks have appeared in most Dragon Ball-related video games. He has also appeared in other related games such as Jump Super Stars, its sequel Jump Ultimate Stars, and Battle Stadium D.O.N. The game Dragon Ball Z: Shin Budokai – Another Road centers around Trunks' battle with Majin Boo in his future timeline. In 1992, Trunks would act as an escort through time in the interactive Video game Dragon Ball Z: Get Together! Goku World. Future Trunks is also featured in the MMORPG Dragon Ball Online, where he is referred to as Time Patrol Trunks (タイム・パトロール・トランクス, Taimu Patorōru Torankusu). This version of Trunks plays a major role in the plot of Dragon Ball: Xenoverse, helping the player to correct changes in the Dragon Ball timeline caused by the manipulations of Towa and Mira and fights the player in the game's climax alongside the game's main antagonist Demigra after becoming possessed by him. After the duo are defeated and Trunks is returned to normal, he intervenes when Demigra tries to take control of the player.

In the Dragon Ball and One Piece crossover manga Cross Epoch, Trunks is a member of Captain Vegeta's air pirate crew. Trunks also made an appearance in the 2004 Fuji TV interactive feature Kyūtai Panic Adventure Returns!, where he and six other Dragon Ball characters delivered the Dragon Balls to restore the aqua city of Odaiba.

In music, the song "Chīsa na Senshi~Goten to Trunks no Theme~" by Shin Oya focuses on both Trunks and Goten.

Trunks has been featured in his own brand of soft drink called Trunks Cola.

== Reception ==
Trunks, especially the future incarnation, has been very positively received. While reviewing the TV special The History of Trunks, which was adapted from the stand-alone manga Trunks the Story: The Lone Warrior, Bobby Cooper of DVD Talk praised Trunks' background story, saying that it was a "good origin story that explains Trunks' motivation for becoming a fighter." Similarly, Chris Shepard of Anime News Network also enjoyed the background story and felt that Trunks was an understandable character who "I was really able to get into and sympathize for during his battles." In an IGN article on Dragon Ball GT, Trunks' character design in GT was criticized as being "goofy". Trunks' final fight against the villain Zamasu from Dragon Ball Super earned praise by Sam Leach from Anime News Network. However, he also called it "cheesy" based on the way Trunks receives energy from all his allies to face his enemy. Shawn Saris from IGN shared similar comments, praising how he accidentally absorbs humanity's powers into his sword to defeat Zamasu while at the same time embracing his humanity.

Trunks is a popular character in the series; his future incarnation placed third in both the 1993 and 1995 Dragon Ball character popularity polls voted on by Weekly Shōnen Jump readers. In 2004, fans of the series voted him the fourth most popular character for a poll in the book Dragon Ball Forever. Trunks has appeared in various Anime Grand Prix polls, appearing fifth in the category "best male character" in the 1992 poll and fifth again in the 1993 poll and nineteenth in the 1994 poll. Jian DeLeon of Complex magazine named him thirteenth on a list of the 25 Most Stylish Anime Characters.. In the Dragon Ball: The One character poll created by Shueisha for the series' 40th anniversary, as well as the first poll for the series conducted worldwide, Trunk's future counterpart was voted the sixth most popular character, while his present counterpart was the thirty-sixth. (Note: The poll only included characters that had appeared in the original Dragon Ball manga.)

Trunks' Japanese voice actor, Takeshi Kusao, has cited Trunks as his favorite Dragon Ball character. He further stated in an interview that he was elated when he was cast to voice him. Kusao noted that Trunks' first appearance had an incredible impact and left a great impression on him, referring to his fight with Frieza, in which he easily defeated the strongest being in the universe. Similarly, Funimation voice actor Christopher Sabat stated that apart from Vegeta, Trunks is his favorite character from the series. He liked how his character is the "lone survivor of the apocalypse, son of the most angry and the most headstrong characters." He additionally liked Trunks' fights, such as the one in which he easily killed Frieza.

In an interview, actor Masi Oka compared his Heroes character Hiro Nakamura to Trunks, as both are time travellers who carry swords. Manga creator Tite Kubo stated that to this day no fight scene has shocked him more than Trunks' first appearance.
