= Dragon Ball Z: Hyper Dimension =

1996 video game

- Developer: Tose
- Publisher: Bandai
- Producers: Takeo Isogai; Toshihiro Suzuki
- Designers: Ichi Fuji; Laru Itagawa; Ni Taka
- Programmers: CLQ; Happy Hasei; Maruko
- Artists: Ganchi; Sarusaru
- Composer: Mitsuhiko Takano
- Series: Dragon Ball
- Platform: Super Nintendo Entertainment System
- Release: JP: 29 March 1996; EU: February 1997
- Genre: Fighting
- Modes: Single-player, multiplayer

Dragon Ball Z: Hyper Dimension (Note: Japanese: ドラゴンボールZ: ハイパー ディメンション, Hepburn: Doragon Bōru Zetto: Haipā Dimenshon) is a 1996 fighting video game developed by Tose and published by Bandai for the Super Nintendo Entertainment System. Based upon Akira Toriyama's Dragon Ball franchise, it is the last fighting game in the series to be released for SNES. Following from the Frieza saga to the conclusion of the Majin Buu saga, its gameplay is similar to the earlier Butōden entries, consisting of one-on-one fights using a main six-button configuration, featuring special moves as well as multiple game modes.

Dragon Ball Z: Hyper Dimension was created over the course of 15 months by most of the same team who worked on the previous three Super Butōden entries for Super Nintendo, with producers Takeo Isogai and Toshihiro Suzuki returning to helm its production, alongside staff from both Toei Animation and V Jump magazine assisting with its development. Hyper Dimension garnered positive reception from critics, but the European version received criticism for its absence of a story mode. The game has never been officially released outside Japan and Europe, although fan translations exist.

== Gameplay ==
Gameplay screenshot of a match between Vegito and Kid Buu

Similar to the earlier Butōden entries on SNES, Dragon Ball Z: Hyper Dimension is a fighting game reminiscent of Street Fighter II. Players fight against other characters in one-on-one matches and the fighter who manages to deplete the health bar of the opponent wins the bout and becomes the winner of the match. The title features three modes of play, however, the story mode is excluded in the European version. The roster consists of ten characters; Goku, Majin Vegeta, Gotenks, Gohan, Vegito, Piccolo, Majin Buu, Kid Buu, Frieza, and Perfect Cell.

Hyper Dimension employs a four-button control scheme; special moves and meteor combos are executed via button combinations.The combat system of the game has unique features differing from the Super Butōden entries in the ability to send a character to the back of a stage and the "Rush Battle System", which are Ki blast counterattacks when both fighters strike at the same time, as well as desperation moves available at low health; removing the split-screen system, and the lifebar now acting as both health and Ki meters. Additionally, when executing special moves, the character's health is automatically decreased while recharging Ki increases it.

== Development and release ==
Dragon Ball Z: Hyper Dimension was the last full-fledged fighting game in the Dragon Ball series developed and released for the Super Nintendo. The game was created over the course of 15 months by most of the same team who worked on the previous three Dragon Ball Z: Super Butōden entries, with producer Toshihiro Suzuki returning to helm its production alongside assistant Takeo Isogai. The music was composed by "Chatrita", Mitsuhiko Takano, "Nakajima" and "Tonkupon". Members of Toei Animation and V Jump magazine also assisted with its development. Early previews showcased both forms of Majin Buu under the working names Buu and Original Buu respectively.

Dragon Ball Z: Hyper Dimension was first slated to be released by Bandai in Japan on March 22, 1996, before being pushed back for a March 29 launch of the same year instead and was later released in Europe in February 1997, housed in a 20-megabit cartridge using the SA1 enhancement chip. Prior to launch, it was showcased to attendees of Shoshinkai 1995, with Club Nintendo magazine announcing that the title was planned to be released in the Mexican market. On April 20, 1996, a compilation album containing music from the game, as well as from Dragon Ball Z: Shin Butōden and Dragon Ball Z: Super Gokuden – Kakusei-Hen was published exclusively in Japan by Columbia, featuring arranged songs composed by Kenji Yamamoto. The title has never been officially released outside Japan and Europe, although fan translations exist.

== Reception ==
Reception

Review scores
Publication	Score
Consoles +	89%
Famitsu	24/40
HobbyConsolas	84%
Jeuxvideo.com	16/20
Joypad	88%
Player One	89%
Super Play	71%
Nintendo Acción	80%
Total!	3+ (C+)
Ultra Player	4/6

Dragon Ball Z: Hyper Dimension received mostly positive reception from critics and players. In a poll taken by Family Computer Magazine, the title received a score of 23.6 out of 30, indicating a large fan following. However, it sold approximately between 162,729 and 220,000 copies during its lifetime in Japan, less than the three previous Super Butōden entries.

Super Play's Tim Weaver praised the audiovisual presentation, addition of the eight-player tournament mode and removal of the split-screen mechanic. However, Weaver stated that Dragon Ball Z: Hyper Dimension felt very similar to the three previous Super Butōden entries and fell short when compared to Street Fighter II. Christophe Delpierre of Player One and Ultra Player gave praise to the detailed visual presentation and technical gameplay system but criticized the sprite animations, music, lack of story mode and innovations. Nevertheless, Delpierre regarded it as a quality game. Grégoire Hellot of Joypad commended various features such as the graphics and controls, but criticized the lack of additional stages and other aspects. Likewise, Richard Homsy of Consoles + gave positive remarks to the graphical presentation and sound design but criticized the character animations and control latency with command inputs. Ultimately, Homsy stated that the title was very far behind of Street Fighter Alpha 2 as a fighting game. Hobby Consolas's Sonia Herranz stated that the game ranked below Street Fighter Alpha 2 and Ultimate Mortal Kombat 3 in terms of roster, criticizing the slow-paced characters and sound design but praised the playability and fun factor.

Nintendo Acción's Javier Abad criticized the exclusion of story mode in the European release. However, Abad highly praised the visual presentation of both characters and stages, as well as the addition of the "Rush Battle" system. Likewise, Marco Häntsch of Total! commended the audiovisual presentation and gameplay but criticized the lack of story mode. In November 1997, in its 60th monthly issue, Nintendo Acción listed it as the 52nd best game they had ever reviewed. Jeuxvideo.com's Rroyd-Y gave high remarks to the animated graphics, gameplay speed and controls but noted that the story mode is only present in the Japanese version. Regardless, he stated that Dragon Ball Z: Hyper Dimension established "itself as the ultimate fighting game" based on Toriyama's universe. An editor of Spanish website Vida Extra stated that it was the most comprehensive fighting game based on Toriyama's work released on a 16-bit console, regarding it to be "A farewell letter to the fans and, at the same time, a love letter to the manga that conquered the world."
