= Dragon Ball Z: Super Butōden =

1993 video game

- Developer: Tose (Note: Additional design work by Design Office D&D)
- Publisher: Bandai
- Directors: Akihumi Kubota; Shinsaku Shimada
- Producer: Toshihiro Suzuki
- Designers: Kinya Takehana; Koji Shimizu
- Programmers: Maruko; Maruko Papa
- Artists: Hirokazu Tamai; Masayuki Takahashi; Seiichiro Shiino
- Composer: Kenji Yamamoto
- Series: Dragon Ball
- Platform: Super Nintendo Entertainment System
- Release: JP: March 20, 1993; EU: November 30, 1993; NA: September 28, 2018
- Genre: Fighting
- Modes: Single-player, multiplayer

Dragon Ball Z: Super Butōden, (Note: Japanese: ドラゴンボールZ: 超武闘伝(ドラゴンボールゼット: スーパーぶとうでん), Hepburn: Doragon Bōru Zetto: Sūpā Butōden; "Dragon Ball Z: Super Fighting Legend") known as Dragon Ball Z in Europe, is a 1993 fighting video game developed by Tose and published by Bandai for the Super Nintendo Entertainment System. It is based upon Akira Toriyama's Dragon Ball franchise, and was its first fighting game.

Due to the popularity of Street Fighter II: The World Warrior at the time, producer Toshihiro Suzuki chose to work on a fighting game when assigned to a new project due to it being his preferred genre. Its gameplay consists of one-on-one fights, with a main six-button configuration, featuring special moves, as well as three playable modes.

Dragon Ball Z: Super Butōden garnered mostly positive reception from critics; most reviewers praised the presentation and gameplay but others felt divided in regards to several design aspects. The game sold approximately 1.3 million units in its first two months of release in Japan. Super Butōden would spawn several sequels; including Dragon Ball Z: Super Butōden 2 (1993), Dragon Ball Z: Super Butōden 3 (1994), Dragon Ball Z: Buyū Retsuden (1994), Dragon Ball Z: Shin Butōden (1995), Dragon Ball Kai: Ultimate Butōden (2011), and Dragon Ball Z: Extreme Butōden (2015).

== Gameplay ==
A match between Goku and Vegeta on planet Namek

Dragon Ball Z: Super Butōden is a fighting game similar to Street Fighter II. Players fight against other characters in one-on-one matches and the fighter who manages to deplete the health bar of the opponent wins the bout and becomes the winner of the match. The game features three modes of play, a roster of 10 playable characters and their respective transformations with one additional transformation being unlockable via cheat code. Characters available are Goku, Piccolo, Vegeta, Frieza, Android 20, Android 18, Android 16, Cell, Trunks and Gohan.

Super Butōden uses a customizable six-button control scheme. Special moves are present in conventional format, with most commands consisting of button combinations. Characters can also dash back and forth by pressing L and R respectively. Unique to the game is the split-screen feature; when one of the two combatants moves far away in the playfield, the view is split to keep both fighters shown in a single screen while their positioning is kept via an on-screen radar.

== Development and release ==
Dragon Ball Z: Super Butōden served as both the first full-fledged fighting game in the Dragon Ball franchise and the first entry in the Super Butōden sub-series. Its development was helmed by producer Toshihiro Suzuki, with Akihumi Kubota and Shinsaku Shimada serving as co-directors. Kinya Takehana and Koji Shimizu co-designed the game with additional design work by Design Office D&D while artists Hirokazu Tamai, Masayuki Takahashi, Seiichiro Shiino, Shinichi Iidawere and Shōko Arai were responsible for the pixel art, in addition to Maruko Papa and "Maruko" acting as programmers. Both music and sound design were handled by Kenji Yamamoto of Hyper Entertainment and Yuki Sabakuma respectively. Other people also assisted with its development. Due to the popularity of fighting games at the time such as Street Fighter II: The World Warrior, Suzuki stated he chose to work on a fighting game when assigned to a new project due to it being his favorite genre.

Dragon Ball Z: Super Butōden was first released by Bandai in Japan on March 20, 1993, and later in Europe on November 30 of the same year. On March 27, 1993, an album was published exclusively in Japan by Columbia, featuring arranged songs co-composed by Yamamoto, Ginji Ogawa and Sueaki Harada of Hyper Monolith. In Japan, a special glitter sticker with a hidden technique written on the back for the game was also distributed as an order bonus. In 2018, the title was included as a limited pre-order bonus for the Nintendo Switch version of Dragon Ball FighterZ, marking its first appearance in North American regions. On October of the same year, Bandai Namco Entertainment announced that the game would be unlocked for free to Switch users in Latin America if their official newsletter reached 10,000 subscribers.

== Music ==
Dragon Ball Z: Super Butoden Game Music

Soundtrack album by Hyper Monolith
- Released: March 27, 1993
- Genre: Anime/Video Game
- Length: 46:25
- Language: Japanese
- Label: Columbia

Dragon Ball Z: Super Butoden Game Music (ドラゴンボールZ超武闘伝ゲームミュージック, Doragon Bōru Zetto Chō Butōden Gēmu Myūjikku; Dragon Ball Z: Super Fighting Story Game Music) is the official licensed soundtrack of the video game. It was released by Columbia Records on March 27, 1993.

This album features arranged (reproduced in a higher quality of musical resources.) tracks that were performed by Hyper Monolith.

Track listing:

1. 《オープニング》超武闘伝のテーマ
  《Ōpuningu》 Sūpā Butôden no Tēma/《Opening》 Theme of Super Butôden
2. 《バトルステージ1》ピッコロのテーマ
  《Batoru Sutēji Wan》 Pikkoro no Tēma/《Battle Stage 1》 Theme of Piccolo
3. 《バトルステージ2》ベジータのテーマ
  《Batoru Sutēji Tzu》 Bejīta no Tēma/《Battle Stage 2》 Theme of Vegeta
4. 《バトルステージ3》フリーザのテーマ
  《Batoru Sutēji Surī》 Furīza no Tēma/《Battle Stage 3》 Theme of Freeza
5. 《バトルステージ4》人造人間20号のテーマ
  《Batoru Sutēji Foru》Jinzōningen Jūnigō no Tēma/《Battle Stage 4》Theme of Artificial Human #20
6. 《バトルステージ5》人造人間18号のテーマ
  《Batoru Sutēji Faivu》Jinzōningen Jūhachigō no Tēma/《Battle Stage 5》Theme of Artificial Human #18
7. コンティニューのテーマ
  Kontinyū no Tēma/Theme of Continue
8. 《バトルステージ6》セルのテーマ
  《Batoru Sutēji Shikkusu》Seru no Tēma/《Battle Stage 6》Theme of Cell
9. 《バトルステージ7》人造人間16号のテーマ
  《Batoru Sutēji Seban》Jinzôningen Jūrokugō no Tēma/《Battle Stage 7》Theme of Artificial Human #16
10. 《バトルステージ8》セル完全体のテーマ
  《Batoru Sutēji Etto》Seru Kanzentai no Tēma/《Battle Stage 8》 Theme of Perfect Cell
11. ファイナル・バトルのテーマ
  Fainaru Batoru no Tēma/Theme of Final Battle
12. 《エンディング》新たなる闘いへ
  《Endingu》Arata Naru Tatakai e/《Ending》Toward a New Battle
13. 《???》超武闘伝:?のテーマ
  《???》Sūpā Butōden: ? no Tēma/《???》Theme of Super Butôden: ?

== Reception ==
Reception

Review scores
Publication	Score
Consoles +	88%
Famitsu	7/10, 7/10, 7/10, 6/10
GameFan	81%, 79%, 72%, 82%
Jeuxvideo.com	13/20
Joypad	77% 88%
Player One	92%
Superjuegos	92/100
Super Play	73%
Nintendo Acción	3/4
Play Time	69%
Super Action	16%
Super Control	57%
Super Pro	51%

Award
Publication	Award
Famimaga (1993)	Best 30 by Game Report Card Division, Character 28th, Originality 21st

=== Sales ===
Upon release in Japan, Dragon Ball Z: Super Butōden topped the Famitsu sales charts in March 1993. Two months after its release in Japan, the title recorded sales of 1.3 million units. It proved to be a commercial hit, with lifetime sales between 1.41 million and, according to Famitsu, 1.45 million units, in Japan alone.

=== Critical response ===
Dragon Ball Z: Super Butōden received mostly positive reception from critics. Famitsu praised the voice samples, the split-screen feature, ability to avoid special moves via button inputs and auto mode for newcomers. Fan reception was positive: readers of Famimaga voted to give the game a 23.08 out of 30 score, ranking at the number 46 spot in a poll, indicating a large popular following. Famimaga also gave it several awards for character and originality respectively.

Spirit, Laurent Defrance and François Hermellin of Consoles + praised the audiovisual presentation, playability and longevity. Olivier Prézeau, Grégoire Hellot and Laurent Deheppe of Joypad commended the digitized sounds, aerial combat, character roster and sprite animations but criticized various aspects such as the visuals for being poor and the French translation. Super Pro's Ryan Butt gave positive remarks to the graphics and sound, characters and their special moves, as well as regarding the split-screen effect to be novel but noted it could become cumbersome, while criticizing the gameplay for being repetitive. Super Action's Frank O'Connor gave a more negative outlook to the game, regarding it to be an "unplayable" Street Fighter II clone. Super Play's Matt Bielby gave positive comment to the graphics, cast of characters, originality and number of special moves but noted it to be "hard to access." Play Time's Klaus Martin also commended the audiovisual presentation but felt mixed in regards to the gameplay. Super Control's Allison West and Paul Mallinson also felt mixed about the visuals, sound, gameplay and overall longevity. In contrast, Sylvain of Player One gave a very positive review of the title, giving it high remarks in multiple areas.

Spanish magazine Nintendo Acción gave very high remarks to the visuals, audio, gameplay and fun factor. Bruno Sol of Superjuegos praised its faithfulness to the original manga, graphics, sound design and number of moves for each character, regarding it as one of the best arcade-style fighting games for Super Nintendo. Jeuxvideo.com's Rroyd-Y stated that "This first game in a successful trilogy is surely not the best episode of the three. Stained by a very heavy gameplay and a disconcerting difficulty, it will really only delight the unconditional fans of the time who seek at all costs to slip into the skin of Son Goku or Vegeta."
