= Dragon Ball Z: Super Butōden 2 =

1993 video game

- Developer: Tose
- Publisher: Bandai
- Director: Shinsaku Shimada
- Producer: Toshihiro Suzuki
- Programmers: JC Pyjama; Maruko; Maruko Père
- Composer: Kenji Yamamoto
- Series: Dragon Ball
- Platform: Super Nintendo Entertainment System
- Release: JP: December 17, 1993; EU: June 1994; NA: October 20, 2015
- Genre: Fighting
- Modes: Single-player, multiplayer

Dragon Ball Z: Super Butōden 2 (Note: Japanese: ドラゴンボールZ: 超武闘伝 2(ドラゴンボールゼット: スーパーぶとうでん 2), Hepburn: Doragon Bōru Zetto: Sūpā Butōden 2; lit. "Dragon Ball Z: Super Fighting Legend 2", also known as Dragon Ball Z: La Légende Saien in Europe) is a 1993 fighting video game developed by Tose and published by Bandai for the Super Nintendo Entertainment System. Based upon Akira Toriyama's Dragon Ball franchise, it is the sequel to Dragon Ball Z: Super Butōden, which was released earlier in 1993 for SNES. Following the Cell Games arc and a side-story about characters from the films Dragon Ball Z: Broly – The Legendary Super Saiyan and Dragon Ball Z: Bojack Unbound, its gameplay remains relatively the same as the original Super Butōden, consisting of one-on-one fights using a main six-button configuration, featuring special moves as well as three playable modes.

Dragon Ball Z: Super Butōden 2 was developed by most of the same team who previously worked on the first Super Butōden entry shortly after its completion. The team wanted to increase the number of playable stages, implement adventure elements to the tournament mode, as well as feature characters from the Dragon Ball Z films in the project. Super Butōden 2 garnered positive reception from critics; most reviewers praised the presentation, visuals, audio, gameplay and improvements made over its predecessor but others regarded it to be similar to Super Butōden and felt mixed in regards to various design aspects. It was followed by Dragon Ball Z: Super Butōden 3 in 1994.

== Gameplay ==
A match between Broly and Zangya

As with its predecessor, Dragon Ball Z: Super Butōden 2 is a fighting game similar to Street Fighter II: The World Warrior. Players fight against other characters in one-on-one matches and the fighter who manages to deplete the health bar of the opponent wins the bout and becomes the winner of the match. The game features three modes of play and a roster of 8 playable characters and their respective transformations, with two additional characters being unlockable via cheat code. Characters available are Goku (unlockable), Vegeta, Gohan, Trunks, Piccolo, Cell, Cell Jr., Broly (unlockable), Bojack and Zangya.

Super Butōden 2 uses a customizable six-button control scheme. Special moves are present in conventional format, with most commands consisting of button combinations. Characters can also dash back and forth by pressing L and R respectively. Players can also charge their Ki gauge by holding the Y and B buttons to unleash a Ki blast attack. Returning from the first game is the split-screen feature; the view is split to keep fighters that are far away in the playfield shown in a single screen, while their positions are kept via an improved on-screen radar. New to the sequel are the introduction of water-based arenas, the ability to counterattack special moves, as well as meteor combos to perform consecutive attacks for most characters (only Goku had one such move in the previous game).

== Development and release ==
Dragon Ball Z: Super Butōden 2 was created by most of the same team who previously worked on the original Super Butōden, with producer Toshihiro Suzuki and Shinsaku Shimada returning to helm its production and direction respectively. Members under the pseudonyms "JC Pyjama", "Maruko" and "Maruko Père" assisted as programmers. Both music and sound design were handled by Akihito "Switch•E" Suita, Kenji Yamamoto and Yuki "Kumatarou" Sabakuma. The French translation was written by Sylvie Bomstein and Takeshi Yasukawa. Other people also assisted with its development. According to Suzuki, development of the sequel began after completion of the original Super Butōden, with most of the staff reuniting again after a one-week vacation. The team decided to increase the number of stages while introducing adventure elements to the martial arts tournament mode, in addition to pushing characters from the Dragon Ball Z films into the game. The underwater stage was commissioned to Toei Animation.

Dragon Ball Z: Super Butōden 2 was first released by Bandai in Japan on December 17, 1993. The game was first slated to be released across Europe in April 1994 before being published in June 1994 by Bandai under the title Dragon Ball Z: La Légende Saien. On December 21, 1993, an album was published exclusively in Japan by Columbia, featuring arranged songs composed by Yamamoto. A translated English version for the Latin American market titled Dragon Ball was previewed in 1996 but never released. In 2015, the Japanese version of Super Butōden 2 was included as a pre-order bonus for Dragon Ball Z: Extreme Butōden on Nintendo 3DS for those who pre-ordered in the United Kingdom through retailer GAME or in the United States through online retailer Amazon using an email with a code to download the title, marking its first appearance in North American regions.

== Music ==
Dragon Ball Z: Super Butoden 2 Game Music

Soundtrack album by Kenji Yamamoto
- Released: December 21, 1993
- Genre: Anime/Video Game
- Length: 49:39
- Language: Japanese
- Label: Forte Music Entertainment
- Producer: Takashi Uchida

Dragon Ball Z: Super Butoden 2 Game Music (ドラゴンボールZ超武闘伝ゲームミュージック, Doragon Bōru Zetto Chō Butōden Tzū Gēmu Myūjikku; Dragon Ball Z: Super Fighting Story 2 Game Music) is the official licensed soundtrack of the video game. It was released by Forte Music Entertainment on December 21, 1993.

This album features arranged tracks, two of which were performed by a live orchestra and the rest remixed reprises.

Track listing:

1. オーブニング
  Ōpuningu/Opening
2. Suite:1 武闘伝モード
  Suite:Wan Butōden Mōdo/Suite:1 Butōden Mode
3. ベジータのテーマ
  Bejīta no Tēma/Theme of Vegeta
4. サンギャのテーマ
  Zangya no Tēma/Theme of Zangya
5. 孫悟飯のテーマ
  Son Gohan no Tēma/Theme of Son Gohan
6. ピッコロのテーマ
  Pikkoro no Tēma/Theme of Piccolo
7. セルのテーマ
  Seru no Tēma/Theme of Cell
8. ボージャックのテーマ
  Bōjakku no Tēma/Theme of Bojack
9. トランクスのテーマ
  Torankusu no Tēma/Theme of Trunks
10. Suite:2 ファイナルバトル~エンティング
  Suite:Tzū Fainaru Batoru~Endingu/Suite:2 Final Battle: Ending

== Reception ==
Reception

Review scores
Publication	Score
Famitsu	27/40
Jeuxvideo.com	16/20
Joypad	93%
Mega Fun	59%
Nintendo Life	7/10
Player One	92%
Superjuegos	93/100
Super Play	73%
Nintendo Acción	92/100
Nintendo Player	5/6

In Japan, the game topped the Famitsu sales chart in December 1993. It proved to be a commercial success, with lifetime sales between 1.15 million and, according to Famitsu, 1.2 million units in Japan alone. Dragon Ball Z: Super Butōden 2 received positive reception from critics and players. Fan reception was positive: in a poll taken by Family Computer Magazine, the title received a score of 23.5 out of 30, indicating a large popular following. The 2016 mook, Perfect Guide of Nostalgic Super Famicom, listed it as the second best fighting game for the Super Famicom.

Grégoire Hellot and Olivier Prézeau of Joypad praised the colorful anime-like visual presentation, character roster and controls but criticized the single-player mode for being repetitive and the lack of music from the Dragon Ball Z anime. Super Play's Dave Golder commended the graphics, gameplay and longevity but felt mixed in regards to the sound, while noting that the game was similar to Dragon Ball Z: Super Butōden. Likewise, Mega Fun's Philip Noak also felt mixed about the audiovisual presentation and gameplay. Spanish magazine Nintendo Acción gave high remarks to the graphical and audio presentations, number of stages, speed and playability.

In a similar manner, Christophe Delpierre of Nintendo Player and Player One also gave positive remarks to the title's character designs and animations, sound design and gameplay, stating that the sequel corrects most of the flaws from the first game. Bruno Sol of Superjuegos praised the counterattack mechanic, stylized character designs, secrets and visuals, stating that "Dragon Ball Z 2 not only surpasses the previous 16-bit release from Nintendo, but we are also facing one of the most original, agile and fun beat'em up in recent years." Jeuxvideo.com's Rroyd-Y and Nintendo Life's Gonçalo Lopes noted the overall improvements made over its predecessor.
