= Dragon Ball Z: Buyū Retsuden =

1994 video game

- Japanese cover art
- Developer: Bandai
- Publisher: Bandai
- Producer: Yasuo Miyakawa
- Programmer: Tadashi Megumi
- Artists: Hideki Suzuki; Hiromi Ishii; Kishiko Matsubara
- Composer: Shinji Amagishi
- Series: Dragon Ball
- Platform: Sega Mega Drive
- Release: JP: April 1, 1994; FR/ESP: June 1994
- Genre: Fighting
- Modes: Single-player, multiplayer

Dragon Ball Z: Buyū Retsuden (Note: Japanese: ドラゴンボールZ: 武勇烈伝(ドラゴンボールゼット: ぶゆうれつでん), Hepburn: Doragon Bōru Zetto: Buyū Retsuden; lit. "Dragon Ball Z: Valiant Legend" or "Dragon Ball Z: Intense Martial Transmission", also known as Dragon Ball Z: L'Appel du Destin (Dragon Ball Z: The Call of Destiny) in France and referred simply as Dragon Ball Z in Portugal and Spain) is a 1994 fighting video game developed and published by Bandai and Ecofilmes for the Sega Mega Drive. Based upon Akira Toriyama's Dragon Ball franchise, it is the only game in the series released for the Mega Drive, following the Frieza and Cell sagas. Its gameplay has been described as a combination of the original Super Butōden and Super Butōden 2, consisting of one-on-one fights using a three-button configuration, featuring special moves and two playable modes.

With the popularity of the Dragon Ball franchise in European regions and the positive reception of the first Super Butōden entry on Super Famicom, Bandai decided developing Dragon Ball Z: Buyū Retsuden for the Mega Drive but its creation process lasted longer than the Super Butōden sub-series. Buyū Retsuden proved popular among players and garnered generally positive reception from critics; Some reviewers praised the addition of characters not featured in the previous Super NES games, split-screen mechanic, audiovisual presentation and gameplay, but other stated it was not on par with both Street Fighter II: The World Warrior and Mortal Kombat, criticizing certain design choices and slow pacing.

== Gameplay ==
A match between Krillin and Recoome on planet Namek

Dragon Ball Z: Buyū Retsuden is a fighting game similar to Street Fighter II. Players fight against other characters in 1-on-1 matches and the fighter who manages to deplete the health bar of the opponent wins the match. The game has two modes of play; Story and Versus. The roster features 11 playable characters: Goku, Gohan, Krillin, Piccolo, Vegeta, Captain Ginyu, Recoome, Frieza, Future Trunks, Android 18 and Cell. Gameplay is quite similar to the Super Butōden entries for SNES; it features the split-screen mechanic that allows the player to stay far from the opponents and perform an energy Ki blast. When a Ki blast is performed far away, the opponent has very little time to defend themselves from it. Buyū Retsuden uses a three-button control scheme; "A" punches, "B" kicks and "C" switches between staying on land or sky. Special moves can be performed via button combinations.

== Development and release ==
Dragon Ball Z: Buyū Retsuden was first published in Japan by Bandai on April 1, 1994, then in France and Spain in June 1994 under the name Dragon Ball Z: L'Appel du Destin, and two years later in Portugal by Ecofilmes under the name Dragon Ball Z. The French/Spanish release features a French translation, while Ecofilmes would take Japanese copies of the game to replace both the cover and manual (but keeping the cartridge) to sell the game as is by promising a free converter cartridge, as the Japanese cartridges cannot fit into European Mega Drive units, but later switched to using the French release instead. Because the Super Famicom dominated the Japanese market, most licensed game titles based on manga and anime properties were released for this platform. However, sales of the Sega Mega Drive were even higher than the SNES in Europe. With the popularity of the Dragon Ball franchise in countries like France and Spain, the original Super Butoden for the SNES was so well-received that Bandai decided the development of a Dragon Ball game for the Mega Drive and its development process was higher than the Super Butoden sub-series. Buyū Retsuden was headed by producer Yasuo Miyakawa, with Tadashi Megumi acting as a co-programmer. Artists Hideki Suzuki, Hiromi Ishii and Kishiko Matsubara were responsible for the pixel art, while Shinji Amagishi served as one of the composers. Other members also collaborated in its development.

== Reception ==
Reception

Review scores
Publication	Score
Beep! MegaDrive	6.5/10
Consoles +	85%
Famitsu	7/10, 6/10, 7/10, 4/10
HobbyConsolas	89/100
Jeuxvideo.com	10/20
Joypad	83%
Mean Machines Sega	81/100
Mega Fun	59%
Player One	80%
Superjuegos	91/100
Super Game Power	4.0/5.0
Mega	77%
Mega Force	80%
MegaTech	75%
Sega Power	64%
Sega Pro	62%
Sega Zone	82%

Dragon Ball Z: Buyū Retsuden received generally positive reception from critics, though most reviewers noted similarities with previous Dragon Ball Z fighting games on Super NES. Public reception was also positive: readers of Mega Drive Fan magazine and the Japanese Sega Saturn Magazine voted to give the game scores of 21.3 out of 30 and 7.3415 out of 10 respectively, ranking at the number 229 spot in a poll of the former publication, indicating a popular following.

Maxime Roure, Sami Souibgui and Richard Homsy of Consoles +, as well as Super Game Power, noted it to be a "sort of" remix of the original Super Butōden and Super Butōden 2 on Super NES, with the former publication criticizing the jerky sprite animations but both magazines praised the visual presentation, anime-esque sound design, longevity, gameplay, difficulty and fun factor. Likewise, Olivier Prézeau and Grégoire Hellot of Joypad commended the addition of characters missing from the Super Famicom entries, graphics, sound design and game modes but criticized the controls for being annoying. In a similar manner, a reviewer of French magazine Mega Force gave it positive comments to the animated visuals for recreating Toriyama's universe and sound but criticized its inadequate controls. Hobby Consolas's Esther Barral gave very high remarks to the graphics, sound design, addictive gameplay and character roster, regarding it to be a well done Street Fighter II-style game, although she noted the learning curve of special attacks and moves in a negative light.

Christophe Delpierre of Player One commended the audiovisual presentation, French translation and playability. However, Delpierre personally found Dragon Ball Z: L'Appel du Destin to be worse than the SNES entries but noted that the game should satisfy Dragon Ball Z fans on the Sega Mega Drive. Sega Zone's Lee Brown gave positive comments to the anime-esque visuals but felt mixed about aspects of the split-screen mechanic and criticized the sound design, while regarding its gameplay to be not as good as Street Fighter II. As with Barral, Francisco Javier Bautista of Superjuegos gave very high remarks to the title's graphics, music, gameplay and story mode but criticized the lack of additional difficulty levels and options. Mean Machines Sega's Lucy Hickman and Gus Swan noted its split-screen mechanic, sound design, amount of moves and game modes in a positive manner but both editors criticized the graphics and animations for being plain and jerky respectively, lack of variety in the music, enemy AI and retail price, with Hickman regarding it to be a Street Fighter II clone. Mega's Paul Mellerick also regarded it to be not as good as Street Fighter II or Mortal Kombat, criticizing its slow pacing. Nevertheless, Mellerick praised the presentation, gameplay and other aspects.

MegaTech's Rich Lloyd and Allie West regarded the split-screen mechanic to be innovative although not as refined as on SNES, while both reviewers praised the anime-style graphics, sound design and learning curve but criticized its overall longevity. Sega Power's Simon Kirrane commended its faithful manga-style presentation of both characters and stages, as well as the split-screen mechanic but criticized the sprite animations, controls and gameplay. In contrast, Sega Pro's Jason Johnson criticized the sluggish sprite animations, sound design and gameplay. Jeuxvideo.com's Rroyd-Y gave positive remarks to the graphics and story mode but criticized its controls for being similar to the first Super Butōden on SNES, as well as its stiff and slow gameplay, stating that "this unique episode on Megadrive is nothing other than a port of Dragon Ball Z 1, which allows itself to bring absolutely nothing new, and even to do less well in terms of content."
