= Android XIII =

Android XIII may refer to:

- Android 13, the thirteenth major release of the Android mobile operating system
- Dragon Ball Z: Super Android 13!, the seventh Dragon Ball Z film

== See also ==
- Android (operating system)
- Dragon Ball Z
