= Dragon Ball Z: Super Butōden 3 =

1994 video game

- Developer: Tose
- Publisher: Bandai
- Producers: Takeo Isogai; Toshihiro Suzuki
- Programmers: Maruko Papa; Motor-OM; TNK
- Artists: Hide San; Pochitto Inujiro
- Composer: Kenji Yamamoto
- Series: Dragon Ball
- Platform: Super Nintendo Entertainment System
- Release: JP: September 29, 1994; EU: January 25, 1995
- Genre: Fighting
- Modes: Single-player, multiplayer

Dragon Ball Z: Super Butōden 3 (Note: Japanese: ドラゴンボールZ: 超武闘伝 3(ドラゴンボールゼット: スーパーぶとうでん 3), Hepburn: Doragon Bōru Zetto: Sūpā Butōden 3; lit. "Dragon Ball Z: Super Fighting Legend 3", also known as Dragon Ball Z: Ultime Menace in Europe) is a 1994 fighting video game developed by Tose and published by Bandai for the Super Nintendo Entertainment System. Based upon Akira Toriyama's Dragon Ball franchise, it is the sequel to Dragon Ball Z: Super Butōden 2, which was released earlier in 1993 for SNES. Following the Majin Buu arc, its gameplay remains relatively the same as the previous two Super Butōden entries, consisting of one-on-one fights using a main six-button configuration, featuring special moves as well as two playable modes.

Dragon Ball Z: Super Butōden 3 was created by most of the same team who previously worked on the first two Super Butōden entries on Super Nintendo, with producer Toshihiro Suzuki returning to lead its production, with additional support from staff of both Toei Animation and V Jump magazine. Like its predecessors, Super Butōden 3 garnered positive reception from critics, however the lack of a story mode was heavily criticized by reviewers. Likely due to the game releasing in the middle of the Majin Buu Saga, rendering a faithful adaptation impossible.

== Gameplay ==
A match between Android 18 and Dabura

Like previous Super Butōden titles, Dragon Ball Z: Super Butōden 3 is a fighting game similar to Street Fighter II: The World Warrior. Players fight against other characters in one-on-one matches and the fighter who manages to deplete the health bar of the opponent wins the bout and becomes the winner of the match. The game features two modes of play (versus and tournament) but missing from the Super Butōden 2 is a story mode. The roster consists of nine playable characters and their respective transformations, with an additional character being unlockable via cheat code. Characters available are Goku, Goten, Trunks (both in his future and younger forms), Majin Vegeta, Gohan, Supreme Kai, Majin Buu, Dabura and Android 18.

Super Butōden 3 uses a customizable six-button control scheme; special moves and meteor combos are executed via button combinations. Characters can dash back and forth by pressing L and R respectively. Players can also charge their Ki gauge by holding the Y and B buttons to unleash a Ki blast attack and counterattack it. Returning from previous Super Butōden entries is the split-screen feature, where the view is split to keep fighters who are far away in the playfield shown on-screen while their respective positions are kept via a radar.

== Development and release ==
Dragon Ball Z: Super Butōden 3 was developed by most of the same team who previously worked on the previous two Super Butōden entries, with producer Toshihiro Suzuki returning to helm its production alongside assistant Takeo Isogai, who previously worked on video game adaptations of Rokudenashi Blues and Game Boy titles. Both music and sound design were handled by Akihito "Switch. E" Suita, Kenji Yamamoto and Shinji "Amayang" Amagishi. Staff from both Toei Animation and V Jump magazine also assisted with its development. When comparing to Super Butōden 2, Isogai stated in a 1994 interview with French magazine Consoles + that the visuals were improved, character animations were reworked and adjustments to the combat system were implemented. Isogai also stated that the team, with fifteen members, worked on Super Butōden 3 over the course of six months. Isogai claimed that developing animation for large sprites such as Dabura proved difficult, while difficulty when faithfully adapting characters from the anime series arose as well. Isogai also claimed that the split-screen feature was difficult to manage due to the character's body extremities disappearing on-screen.

Dragon Ball Z: Super Butōden 3 was first released by Bandai in Japan on September 29, 1994, and later in Europe on January 25, 1995, under the title Dragon Ball Z: Ultime Menace. Takeo Isogai claimed that due to the Dragon Ball Z anime not being broadcast in the United States, United Kingdom and Germany, the game would not sell in those countries and its release in Europe was limited to France, Italy and Spain. Prior to launch, the game was showcased by Bandai at the 1994 Tokyo Toy Fair. On October 21, 1994, an album was published exclusively in Japan by Columbia, featuring arranged songs composed by Yamamoto. On November 7, 1994, an official strategy guide was released in Japan by Shueisha, featuring Suzuki explaining the gameplay system.

== Music ==
Dragon Ball Z: Super Butoden 3 Game Music

Soundtrack album by Kenji Yamamoto
- Released: October 21, 1994
- Genre: Anime/Video Game
- Length: 40:38
- Language: Japanese
- Label: Forte Music Entertainment

Dragon Ball Z: Super Butoden 3 Game Music (ドラゴンボールZ超武闘伝3 ゲームミュージック, Doragon Bōru Zetto Chô Butôden Surī Gēmu Myūjikku; Dragon Ball Z: Super Fighting Story 3 Game Music) is the official licensed soundtrack of the video game. It was released by Forte Music Entertainment on October 21, 1994.

This album features arranged (reproduced in a higher quality of musical resources) remixes by Kenji Yamamoto, since a majority of the compositions also appeared in Super Butoden 2.

Track listing:

1. OVERTURE～迫る！！「天下一武道会」～
  OVERTURE~Semaru!! "Tenkaichi Budôkai"~/Overture: Drawing near!! The "Tenkaichi Budokai"
2. 「オープニングテーマIII」～激動の「天下一武道会」開催！！～
  "Ōpuningu Tēma Surī"~Gekidô no "Tenkaichi Budôkai" Kaisai!!~/"Opening Theme III": The Chaotic "Tenkaichi Budôkai" Convenes!!
3. 「孫悟天～トランクス」～少年の部、決勝戦～
  [Son Goten~Torankusu]~Shônen no Bu, Kesshôsen~/"Son Goten~Trunks": Category of Juveniles, Final Games
4. 「新Z戦士」～本戦始まる！！～
  [Shin Zetto Senshi]~Hon Sen Hajimaru!!~/"New Z Warrior": True Battle Begins!!
5. 「魔人ブウ」Variation～悪の魔導師登場！！～
  [Majin Buu] Variation~Aku no Madôshi Tôjô!!~/"Majin Buu" Variation: Evil Magician Enters!!
6. 「悟空」と「ベジータ」のメドレー～宿命の対決～
  [Gokū] to [Bejīta] no Medorē~Shukumei no Taiketsu~/ Medley of "Goku" and "Vegeta": Showdown of Fate
7. 「魔人ブウ」～魔人の復活～
  [Majin Buu]~Majin no Fukkatsu~/"Majin Buu": Revival of Majin
8. 「青年トランクス」のテーマ Variation～未来から来た超戦士～
  [Seinen TORANKUSU] no TĒMA Variation~Mirai kara Kita Chô Senshi~/Theme of "Young Trunks" Variation: Super Warrior that came from the Future
9. 「エンディングテーマIII」～「孫悟空」Variation～
  [Endingu Tēma Surī]~[Son Gokū] Variation~/"Ending Theme III": "Son Goku" Variation
10. FINALE～「凶戦士ベジータ」Power up version～
  FINALE~[Kyô Senshi Bejīta] Power up version~/FINALE:"Evil Warrior Vegeta" Power up version

== Reception ==
Reception

Review scores
Publication	Score
Consoles +	85%
Famitsu	7/10, 5/10, 7/10, 5/10
HobbyConsolas	87/100
Jeuxvideo.com	12/20
Joypad	91%
Player One	87%
Super Play	70%
Nintendo Acción	78/100
Nintendo Player	4/6
Super Power	84/100

Dragon Ball Z: Super Butōden 3 received positive reception from critics and players. In a poll taken by Family Computer Magazine, the game received a score of 21.9 out of 30, indicating a popular following. The title also sold approximately 910,000 copies in Japan.

Olivier Prézeau and Grégoire Hellot of Joypad praised the new characters, music and animation speed, however they criticized the lack of story mode and technical innovations compared to Dragon Ball Z: Super Butōden 2. Super Play's Tony Mott noted it to be similar to Super Butōden 2, praising both visuals and gameplay but felt mixed in regards to the sound and overall longevity. Likewise, Christophe Delpierre of Nintendo Player and Player One commended the graphical presentation, speed, sound design and controls but also noted similarities with the previous game, stating that "This new DBZ is far from bad, but it innovates too little compared to its predecessor."

Hobby Consolas's Sonia Herranz gave positive remarks to the audiovisual presentation and gameplay, however it was criticized for the lack of a story mode and innovations compared to previous Super Butōden entries. In a similar manner, Nintendo Acción's Javier Abad praised the manga-like visuals, sound design and addition of new characters but criticized the lack of story mode. Jeuxvideo.com's Rroyd-Y commended the visuals quality of both characters and stages, playability and music but criticized the lack of story mode as well, stating that "While its predecessor turned out to be excellent, the last game in this trilogy is a huge disappointment. A sad result for what was to be the ultimate Dragon Ball Z experience on Super Nintendo."
