= Dragon Ball Z: Burst Limit =

2008 video game

- European PlayStation 3 cover art
- Developer: Dimps
- Publishers: JP/EU: Namco Bandai Games (Note: Released under the Bandai brand name.); NA/AU: Atari
- Directors: Yutaka Fujimoto; Daisuke Aoki
- Producers: Tomoaki Imanishi; Ryo Mito
- Designer: Atsushi Maeda
- Programmer: Hiroyuki Kudo
- Artist: Atsushi Maeda
- Writers: Hiroaki Murata; Hidenori Nakamura
- Composer: Kenji Yamamoto
- Series: Dragon Ball; Budokai
- Platforms: PlayStation 3; Xbox 360
- Release: JP: June 5, 2008; EU: June 6, 2008; NA: June 10, 2008; AU: July 3, 2008
- Genre: Fighting
- Modes: Single-player, multiplayer

Dragon Ball Z: Burst Limit (Note: Japanese: ドラゴンボールZ BURST LIMIT(バーストリミット), Hepburn: Doragon Bōru Zetto Bāsuto Rimitto) is a fighting video game for the PlayStation 3 and Xbox 360 based on the anime Dragon Ball Z. The game was developed by Dimps and published in North America and Australia by Atari, and in Japan and Europe by Namco Bandai under the Bandai label. It was released in Japan on June 5, 2008, in Europe on June 6, 2008, North America on June 10, 2008, and in Australia on July 3, 2008.

The game allows the player the opportunity to let their character battle other characters controlled by the in game AI, or another player both on or offline depending on the mode of play the player or players choose. The game's Z Chronicles story mode allows players the chance to relive key points of the three sagas within the Dragon Ball story with the aid of items called Drama Pieces that give what has been called an immense Dragon Ball experience. The game became a top rated title for the PlayStation 3 and was nominated for a Spike Video Game Award for best fighting game.

== Gameplay ==
A screenshot of the fighting gameplay. The top two bars represent both characters' health. The three icons underneath it are the available Drama Pieces. The bars at the bottom of the screen display both players' ki needed for special attacks and transformations.

The game's combat presentation is displayed in a 3D format. Players take control and battle one of the characters from the Dragon Ball franchise. Players are also given the ability to partner with another character within the game, in a vein similar to that of the Shin Budokai series. However, unlike those games, assisting characters do not fight, but instead provide various bonuses during the battle.

Another attack ability is Aura Spark mode; in this mode players can utilize stronger attacks, but this will eventually drain the player's ki gauge. Unlike previous Dragon Ball fighting games, players are not given the ability to build their ki. Instead, the gauge refills over time.

Taking the place of Skill Capsules are items called Drama Pieces. These appear in the form of in-game cut scenes that can affect the gameplay and overall outcome of the battle, such as the character receiving a Senzu Bean from their partner for health, the character's defense or attack raised, or their partner jumping in to defend. Drama Pieces can only be activated when certain achievements are met.

One of the game's main modes of play is the "Z Chronicles" which allows the player the opportunity to relive key points from the "Saiyan" saga to the "Cell Games" arc. There are also two exclusive stories within this mode. The first where Bardock defeats Frieza and finds himself mysteriously on present day Earth, and the second where Broly journeys to Earth in search of Goku. Another game mode is the Trial mode, where players are given the option of three types of challenges: the Survival Mode, where players must fight a wave of opponents for as long as their health last, the Time Attack Mode, where the player must defeat opponents before a certain amount of time runs out, and the Battle Points Mode, where players must earn battle points in battle.

The game features an online mode where players battle other players locally or internationally, and also post their high scores from the different game modes.

The "Beam Struggles" in the attacks can be only collide if they are both energy beams. If an energy wave or energy sphere collides with an energy spheres, both attacks will be canceled out. The two characters which is the same buttons mashing in order to push the two beams to one character or the other.

== Development ==
Drama Pieces like this one affect the battle such as improving a player's health. It was envisioned that scenes likes these would help give the player a more immersive Dragon Ball experience.

The game was first announced in the December 2007 issue of V Jump magazine. It was stated that the game would utilize 2-D fighting mechanics, the cut scenes would affect the overall gameplay and that it would be released for both the PlayStation 3 and Xbox 360 games consoles the following year in Japan. The January issue of V Jump featured information regarding some of the game's battle mechanics and battle rules. On January 16, Atari issued a press release announcing that they would be distributing the game throughout North America and that they would retain the Burst Limit title. The February issue of V Jump revealed that the game's story mode would extend into at least the Cell saga. Later that month, an early demo of the game was presented at the 2008 Game Developers Conference. It was revealed that the game would feature both the English and Japanese voice cast and that it would be expected to be released sometime in the third quarter. A spread in the March issue of V Jump revealed that the game would feature at least thirty-five playable characters and thirteen battle stages. With some of the featured stages being the Cell arena, the unstable Namek, and Earth's orbit. It would also reveal the cover art and Japanese release date for June 6. Another spread in the April issue of V Jump discussed more on the battle systems and visuals. In May, a playable demo of the game was released on Xbox Live Marketplace and PlayStation Network. On June 10, Atari issued another announcement stating that they had shipped copies of the game to retailers throughout North America. Later that month, the game was unveiled at New York Comic Con for a hands-on demonstration.

According to producer Yasuhiro Nishimura, the game is not a fighting game, but simply "A Dragon Ball Z game". The idea was not to make a game that would be another licensed cash in, but a game that could be held with as much prestige as the manga and anime. As Nishimura went on record stating "We want this to be a new expression of Dragon Ball Z, not just an extension." Naoki Eguchi of Namco Bandai Europe stated that both the PS3 and Xbox 360 versions were produced simultaneously and that the gameplay was similar to Budokai 3 with new improvement integrated. He continued that they were very pleased with the shaders as they allowed ""High-end quality Anime-expressions" and let us create dramatic animations". He would point out, "We do not aim to be "realistic", but to maintain a high quality "anime" style". Co-producer Yasu Nishimura stated that Shueisha had some involvement with ideas for the game development. The developers also wanted to put emphasis on character sizes. Small characters like Krillin and Kid Gohan move quickly, while larger characters like Broly move slower.

== Characters ==
Name	Playable Transformations	Playable at Start
Android #16		No
Android #17		No
Android #18		No
Bardock		No
Broly	Legendary Super Saiyan	No
Captain Ginyu		No
Cell	Imperfect Form; Semi-Perfect Form; Perfect Form; Super Perfect Form	No
Frieza	First Form; Second Form; Third Form; Final Form; 100% Full Power	No
Gohan (Kid)	Base; Potential Unleashed	Yes
Gohan (Teen)	Base; Super Saiyan; Super Saiyan 2	No
Goku	Base; Kaioken; Super Saiyan	Yes
Krillin	Base; Potential Unleashed	No
Nappa		No
Piccolo	Base; Sync with Nail; Fuse with Kami	Yes
Raditz		No
Recoome		No
Saibaman		No
Tien		No
Trunks (Future)	Base; Super Saiyan; Super Saiyan Third Grade	No
Vegeta	Base; Super Saiyan; Super Saiyan Second Grade	No
Yamcha		No

== Music ==
Dragon Ball Z: Burst Limit Original Soundtrack

Soundtrack album by Kenji Yamamoto
- Released: August 27, 2008
- Genre: Anime/Video Game
- Length: 60:00
- Language: Japanese
- Label: Lantis Records

Singles from Dragon Ball Z: Burst Limit Original Soundtrack
- 1. "Kiseki no Honō yo Moeagare!" Released: July 28, 2008

Dragon Ball Z: Burst Limit Original Soundtrack (ドラゴンボールZ バーストリミットオリジナルサウンドトラック, Doragon Bōru Zetto Bāsuto Rimitto Orijinaru Saundotorakku) is the official soundtrack to the video game. It was released by Lantis Records on August 27, 2008, in Japan only. The theme song "Kiseki no Honō yo Moeagare!" and its English counterpart "Fight it Out" were written by Yuriko Mori and Kanon Yamamoto (Canon) respectively, and performed by Jpop vocalist Hironobu Kageyama. It was believed that it would be accompanied by composition from the previous game Dragon Ball Z: Budokai Tenkaichi 3. As a result many online retailer to erroneously list this as the soundtrack of both games.

Track listing:

1. 奇跡の炎よ 燃え上がれ!!(GAME OP size)
  Kiseki no Honō yo Moeagare!!/Flare Up Miraculous Fire!!
2. Sizzle Dizzle
3. Raging Evil
4. Festa de Morado
5. 果てしなく赤い荒野
  Hateshinaku Akai Arano/Eternally Red Wasteland
6. May I help you?
7. キャプテン・スリル
  Kyaputen Suriru/Captain Thrill
8. Unbreakable Mission
9. 破壊～Heartbeat of Battle Fields～
  Hakai ~Heartbeat of Battle Fields~/Destruction ~Heartbeat of Battle Fields~
10. 絶体絶命～DEAD HAND～
  Zettai Zetsumei ~DEAD HAND~/Desperate Situation ~Dead Hand~
11. 青い嵐
  Aoi Arashi/Blue Storm
12. Let's Fight! Fight!
13. 怒りを力に・・・
  ikari o chikara ni.../Anger Towards Power....
14. 天空都市
  Tenkū Toshi/Sky City
15. Naughty Pilgrims
16. Kaffein
17. Smoky September
18. 呪文
  Jumon/Incantation
19. ΦtiNg☆dAnCE
  FaitiNg☆dAnCE/Fighting Dance
20. Battleholic～孤高の狼～
  Battleholic ~Kokō no Ōkami~/Battleholic ~Superiority of the Wolf~
21. 世界ノ果テニ笑ヒシ悪魔
  Sekai no Hate Teni emi Hishi Akuma/Devil Laughing at the End of the World
22. シュウエン
  Shūen/Demise
23. 呼び醒まされた闘志
  Yobi Samasa re ta Tōshi/The Awakened Fighting Spirit
24. 最終血戦
  Saishū Kessen/Final Bloody Battle
25. 運命
  Unmei/Fate
26. Fight it Out

== Reception ==
Reception

Aggregate score
Aggregator	Score	
Aggregator	PS3	Xbox 360
Metacritic	71/100	72/100

Review scores
Publication	Score	
Publication	PS3	Xbox 360
1Up.com	C+	C+
Eurogamer	N/A	7/10
Famitsu	33/40	33/40 (360) 31/40
GameDaily	7/10	7/10
GameSpot	7.5/10	7.5/10
GameSpy	N/A	4/5
GameTrailers	N/A	8.2/10
GameZone	8/10	7.9/10
Giant Bomb	3/5	3/5
Hardcore Gamer	4.5/5	4.5/5
IGN	7.9/10	(US) 7.9/10 (AU) 7.8/10
Official Xbox Magazine (US)	N/A	7.5/10
PlayStation: The Official Magazine	2.5/5	N/A
411Mania	N/A	7.5/10

The game received above-average reviews according to the review aggregation website Metacritic. In Japan, Famitsu gave it a score of one nine and three eights for a total of 33 out of 40,while Famitsu X360 gave the Xbox 360 version one eight, one seven, and two eights for a total of 31 out of 40.

Chris Roper of IGN felt that the combat mechanics were "simple and deep", but had issues with the extent to which many of the characters and stages were similar to each other. Will Herring of GamePro praised the games' visuals and felt that the Drama Pieces integrated well within the Z Chronicles. However, he stated that they didn't seem to work well when applied to the multiplayer mode. (Note: GamePro gave the game 4.75/5 for graphics, 4.5 for sound, 4/5 for control, and 4.25/5 for fun factor.) Justin Calvert of GameSpot stated the visuals and animation would impress regular gamers, despite referring to the environments as bland. He continued, saying that "the overall look of Burst Limit is definitely greater than the sum of its parts". Phil Theobald of GameSpy felt the lack of content made the X360 version of the game feel a little shallow, but called it a quality fighting game with an improved game engine that couldn't be denied. GameTrailers praised the same version by calling it "a well-rounded package in fighting shape", while keeping its paces with plenty of gaming modes. They also stated that its depth might not please hardcore gamers, but fans or gamers looking for a user friendly fighter might enjoy it. Dakota Grabowski of GameZone stated that the X360 version was an excellent game with some drawbacks, such as lack of characters and an under refined online multiplayer, but felt the game was a critical success. Matt Cabral of Official Xbox Magazine praised the controls and the visuals. He also stated "after countless titles spanning various platforms, we may just have the best Dragon Ball Z game yet".

However, some critics were not as pleased with the game overall. Anthony Gallegos of 1Up.com was impressed by the game at first but was ultimately disappointed by its lack of innovation. Dale Nardozzi of TeamXbox called much of the games features bare bones. He also complained about the game's sixty dollar price tag, stating that the gameplay didn't justify the game's cost. He recommended as that consumers would be better off getting the game as a trade-in, a rental, or as a loan from a Dragon Ball Z fan.

During the days after the game's initial release, a few gaming critics managed to give some statement about the soundtrack. Calvert stated that "...the upbeat soundtrack is something of an acquired taste".

Following its initial release, the PS3 version became the top selling game in Japan for a total of three months. Beating out its Xbox 360 counterpart, which came in at twelve, and other games including Mario Kart Wii, which came at four, and Ninja Gaiden II, which came in at eight. Atari reported that the game along with Alone in the Dark helped to increase the company's net sales. The game was nominated for a Spike video game award for best fighting game, but lost out to Soul Calibur IV.
