= Dragon Ball Z: Bojack Unbound =

- Theatrical release poster
- Directed by: Yoshihiro Ueda
- Screenplay by: Takao Koyama
- Based on: Dragon Ball by Akira Toriyama
- Starring: See below
- Music by: Shunsuke Kikuchi
- Production companies: Toei Company, Ltd; Toei Animation
- Distributed by: Toei Company
- Release date: July 10, 1993
- Running time: 51 minutes
- Country: Japan
- Language: Japanese
- Box office: ¥2.23 billion ($20.1 million)

Dragon Ball Z: Bojack Unbound, known in Japan as Dragon Ball Z: Ginga Giri-Giri!! Butchigiri no Sugoi Yatsu (Japanese: ドラゴンボールZ 銀河ギリギリ!!ぶっちぎりの凄い奴; lit. 'Dragon Ball Z: The Last Minute of the Galaxy!! A Super Incredible Guy'), is a 1993 Japanese animated science fantasy martial arts film and the ninth Dragon Ball Z feature film. It was released in Japan on July 10 at the Toei Anime Fair, where it was shown alongside Dr. Slump and Arale-chan: N-cha! From Penguin Village with Love and Yu Yu Hakusho: The Movie. The antagonist Bojack was created by Takao Koyama and was designed by series creator Akira Toriyama. The film is the last to feature Kōhei Miyauchi as Master Roshi, who died two years after its release. It was preceded by Dragon Ball Z: Broly – The Legendary Super Saiyan and followed by Dragon Ball Z: Broly – Second Coming.

== Plot ==
A wealthy family hosts an intergalactic martial arts tournament on Earth in which fighters from across the galaxy compete including Gohan, Piccolo, Future Trunks, Tien Shinhan, Yamcha, and Krillin. All but Yamcha effortlessly advance much to the concern of Mr. Satan who recognizes them from the battle against Cell and knows he will need to face whichever one of them wins. In the semifinals, Trunks fights Tien and defeats him and Piccolo is annoyed by the lack of challenge and forfeits against Krillin. Gohan, Trunks, and Krillin advance to the finals where they each battle an alien fighter. However, as the alien fighters are revealed, the fight promoter realizes that these are not the staged, fake aliens that he recruited for the event. Trunks is challenged by a sword welding alien warrior named Kogu, Krillin is defeated by a female alien named Zangya, Gohan confronts the mysterious alien Bujin, and another tournament contestant Doskoi is killed by the alien fighter Bido. Meanwhile, having been complaining of fake stomach pain to avoid fighting, Mr. Satan gets trapped in a transportation pod and sent to the battlefield.

Trunks is surprised by his alien opponent's lethality and is forced to transform into a Super Saiyan to kill him. Trunks is then struck down by an unknown foe while Gohan continues his fight with Bujin until he discovers Trunks and Krillin have been incapacitated. Bojack arrives and tells Gohan about his plans to conquer the universe. Tien and Yamcha join the fight but are quickly defeated by Bojack's minions. Gohan fights them as Bojack watches on in amusement. While in the Other World, Goku and King Kai watch the battle with concern. King Kai reveals that centuries prior, the galactic warlord Bojack had been sealed inside of a star by all four Kais, but when Cell exploded on King Kai's planet, this allowed Bojack to become unbound.

Gohan is overwhelmed by the trio of minions and is nearly killed by Bojack until Piccolo saves him. Piccolo challenges Bojack but is quickly defeated. Trunks also challenges Bojack but is paralyzed by Bujin's energy absorption technique and nearly impaled by Bido's spear before he is saved by the surprise arrival of Vegeta. Bojack pummels Vegeta and assumes his "full power" form while Trunks is overwhelmed by Bojack's minions. With Vegeta, Trunks, and everyone else incapacitated, Gohan fights Bojack alone but is paralyzed by the combined energy absorption techniques of his minions. Gohan is attacked by Bojack but the sudden arrival of Mr. Satan's incoming pod distracts them. Gohan prepares to fight once again but is struck down by Bojack and his minions as Goku watches on helplessly as his son is captured in a bear hug and tortured.

Against the rules of Other World, Goku abruptly uses his instantaneous movement technique to transport himself to the fight and strikes Bojack before he can kill Gohan. After some advice and reassurance, Goku places his son on the ground safely and vanishes. Gohan, reinvigorated by his father's words, transforms into his Super Saiyan 2 form. Now unaffected by their attacks, Gohan effortlessly kills Bido and Bujin and Zangya is killed when Bojack blasts her toward Gohan. Bojack is impaled through the abdomen by Gohan's fist and as a last resort, he powers up a massive energy blast which Gohan counters with a Kamehameha wave. The energy beams clash and Bojack is killed. Gohan, exhausted, falls in delight as Goku praises his son from Other World. After the battle, the warriors and their friends laugh as they watch the news from the hospital that Mr. Satan is the one who defeated the alien intruders. On the roof, Vegeta and Piccolo sit, unimpressed by the cheerful tidings.

== Cast ==
Character name	Voice actor(s)		
Character name	Japanese	English	
Character name	Japanese	Unknown/AB Groupe (c. 2002)	Funimation (2004)
Gohan	Masako Nozawa	Jodi Forrest	Stephanie Nadolny
Goku	Masako Nozawa	David Gasman	Sean Schemmel
Piccolo	Toshio Furukawa	Big Green	Christopher Sabat
Piccolo	Toshio Furukawa	Paul Bandey	Christopher Sabat
Trunks	Takeshi Kusao; Hiromi Tsuru (baby)	Doug Rand; Jodi Forrest (baby)	Eric Vale; Stephanie Nadolny (baby)
Yamcha	Tōru Furuya	Doug Rand	Christopher Sabat
Tien Shinhan	Hirotaka Suzuoki	Tenshin	John Burgmeier
Tien Shinhan	Hirotaka Suzuoki	David Gasman	John Burgmeier
Krillin	Mayumi Tanaka	Clearin	Sonny Strait
Krillin	Mayumi Tanaka	Sharon Mann	Sonny Strait
Chaozu	Hiroko Emori	Jodi Forrest	Chiaotzu
Chaozu	Hiroko Emori	Jodi Forrest	Monika Antonelli
Vegeta	Ryo Horikawa	Ed Marcus	Christopher Sabat
Mr. Satan	Daisuke Gōri	Mr. Sahtan	Hercule (edited version)
Mr. Satan	Daisuke Gōri	Paul Bandey	Chris Rager
Bulma	Hiromi Tsuru	Bloomer	Tiffany Vollmer
Bulma	Hiromi Tsuru	Jodi Forrest	Tiffany Vollmer
Chi-Chi	Naoko Watanabe	Sharon Mann	Cynthia Cranz
Kame-Sennin	Kōhei Miyauchi	Ed Marcus	Master Roshi
Kame-Sennin	Kōhei Miyauchi	Ed Marcus	Mike McFarland
Oolong	Naoki Tatsuta	David Gasman	Brad Jackson
Gyosan Money (ギョーサン・マネー, Gyōsan Manē)	Naoki Tatsuta	Mr. Multibillionaire	X.S. Cash
Gyosan Money (ギョーサン・マネー, Gyōsan Manē)	Naoki Tatsuta	Ed Marcus	Grant James
Okkane Money (オッカネー・マネー, Okkanē Manē)	Hiromi Tsuru	Mrs. Multibillionaire	Lotta Cash
Okkane Money (オッカネー・マネー, Okkanē Manē)	Hiromi Tsuru	Jodi Forrest	Jamie Marchi
Dollar Money (ドル・マネー, Doru Manē)	Hiroko Emori	Dollar Multibillionaire	Monty Cash
Dollar Money (ドル・マネー, Doru Manē)	Hiroko Emori	Sharon Mann	Colleen Clinkenbeard
Producer	Toshio Furukawa	David Gasman	Dameon Clarke
Kim	Unknown	Sharon Mann	Amber Cotton
Kaiō	Jōji Yanami	Ed Marcus	King Kai
Kaiō	Jōji Yanami	Ed Marcus	Sean Schemmel
Bubbles	Naoki Tatsuta	Ed Marcus	Christopher Sabat
Zangya (ザンギャ)	Tomoko Maruo	Jodi Forrest	Colleen Clinkenbeard
Gokua (ゴクア)	Toshiyuki Morikawa	Paul Bandey	Kogu
Gokua (ゴクア)	Toshiyuki Morikawa	Paul Bandey	Ethan Rains
Bido (ビドー, Bidō)	Hisao Egawa	Ed Marcus	Robert McCollum
Bujin (ブージン, Būjin)	Hiroko Emori	Sharon Mann	Christopher Bevins
Bojack (ボージャック, Bōjakku)	Tesshō Genda	Boojack	Bob Carter
Bojack (ボージャック, Bōjakku)	Tesshō Genda	Doug Rand	Bob Carter
Doskoi (ドスコイ, Dosukoi)	Naoki Tatsuta	Paul Bandey	Brad Jackson
Udo (ウドー, Udō)	Kōhei Miyauchi	Ed Marcus	Brice Armstrong
Narrator	Jōji Yanami	Ed Marcus	Kyle Hebert

A third English version, produced and released exclusively in Malaysia by Speedy Video, features an unknown cast.

== Music ==
- OP (Opening Theme):
  - "Cha-La Head-Cha-La"
    - Lyrics by Yukinojō Mori
    - Music by Chiho Kiyooka
    - Arranged by Kenji Yamamoto
    - Performed by Hironobu Kageyama
- ED (Ending Theme):
  - Ginga o Koete Raijingu Hai (銀河を超えてライジング・ハイ, "Beyond Galaxies Rising High")
    - Lyrics by Dai Satō
    - Music by Chiho Kiyooka
    - Arranged by Kenji Yamamoto
    - Performed by Hironobu Kageyama

=== English dub soundtrack ===
The score for the Funimation English dub was composed by Mark Menza. The Double Feature release contains an alternate audio track containing the English dub with original Japanese background music by Shunsuke Kikuchi, an opening theme of "Cha-La Head-Cha-La", and an ending theme of "Beyond Galaxies Rising High".

== Box office ==
At the Japanese box office, the film sold 3.3 million tickets and grossed ¥2.23 billion ($20.1 million).

== Releases ==
It was released on DVD and VHS in North America on August 17, 2004. It was later released in Double Feature set along with Super Android 13! (1992) for Blu-ray and DVD on February 10, 2009, both feature full 1080p format in HD remastered 16:9 aspect ratio and an enhanced 5.1 surround mix. The film was re-released to DVD in remastered thinpak collection on December 6, 2011, containing the second 4 Dragon Ball Z films.

AB Groupe released the film in Europe under the title Dragon Ball Z: Super Guy in the Galaxy. It was also the last Dragon Ball Z film to have an English dub produced by AB Groupe, although it was marketed as the 9th volume in the VHS/DVD set by Bridge Entertainment in the Netherlands, followed by Bardock – The Father of Goku, The History of Trunks, and Dead Zone.
