= Dragon Ball Z: Super Android 13! =

- Theatrical release poster
- Directed by: Kazuhito Kikuchi
- Screenplay by: Takao Koyama
- Based on: Dragon Ball by Akira Toriyama
- Starring: See below
- Cinematography: Toshiharu Takei
- Edited by: Shin'ichi Fukumitsu
- Music by: Shunsuke Kikuchi
- Distributed by: Toei Company
- Release date: July 11, 1992 (Japan)
- Running time: 46 minutes
- Country: Japan
- Language: Japanese
- Box office: ¥2.55 billion (Japan)

Dragon Ball Z: Super Android 13!, known in Japan as Dragon Ball Z: Kyokugen Batoru!! San Dai Sūpā Saiyajin (ドラゴンボールZ 極限バトル!!三大超サイヤ人; lit. 'Dragon Ball Z: Extreme Battle!! Three Great Super Saiyans'), is a 1992 Japanese anime science fiction martial arts film and the seventh Dragon Ball Z film. It was released in Japan on July 11 at the Toei Anime Fair along with the third Dragon Quest: Dai no Daibōken film and the Rokudenashi Blues film. It was preceded by Dragon Ball Z: The Return of Cooler and followed by Dragon Ball Z: Broly – The Legendary Super Saiyan.

== Plot ==
The mad scientist Dr. Gero is killed by his awakened creations, the Androids 17 and 18. However, Gero secretly copied his consciousness into an underground supercomputer that continued to manifest his dream of creating the Ultimate Android capable of killing Goku and destroying humanity.

At a shopping mall, Goku, Gohan, Chi-Chi, Krillin, Master Roshi, Oolong, and Future Trunks eat lunch in a restaurant. Two beings enter the city, causing mayhem as they hunt for Goku, eventually detecting his location in the restaurant above them. They use a massive ki attack to try and kill Goku, but Goku, Gohan, Krillin, and Trunks survive and save the people inside the restaurant from certain death. The culprits confront Goku, and Goku correctly assumes they are androids because he cannot sense their ki. Introducing themselves as Androids 14 and 15, they attack and overwhelm Goku before Trunks intervenes. Goku suggests that they take the fight elsewhere to avoid harming innocent people in the city, and they fly off as the androids pursue them.

Goku and Trunks engage the androids until Android 13 also appears. 13 explains that despite Dr. Gero's death, his computer has been programmed to continue the mission to kill Goku out of revenge for defeating the Red Ribbon Army decades prior. 13 quickly overwhelms Goku. At the same time, Trunks is outmatched by the combined assault of 14 and 15. However, Vegeta also arrives and joins the fight. Goku engages 13 while Trunks and Vegeta fight 14 and 15, respectively. Goku, Vegeta, and Trunks all simultaneously power up to their Super Saiyan forms. 13 manages to hold the upper hand against Goku, who is soon assisted by the arrival of Piccolo, while Trunks and Vegeta destroy 14 and 15. They surround 13, who absorbs 14 and 15's cores and transforms into a hulking form, Super Android 13.

Super Android 13 completely overwhelms Goku and his allies with his newfound power. Seeing no other option for victory, Goku begins summoning ki for the Spirit Bomb attack while his allies attempt to hold off Super 13. Super 13 eventually realizes what Goku is doing. It attempts to stop him, but Piccolo manages to hold him off just long enough for Goku to transform into a Super Saiyan again, and he absorbs the Spirit Bomb's energy. Super 13 attacks again, but Goku punches through Super 13's abdomen and sends him soaring into the core of the Spirit Bomb, where he is obliterated. With Super 13's demise, the underground supercomputer shuts down for good.

Krillin and Gohan are hospitalized, and the group modestly celebrates their victory together. Elsewhere, Piccolo and Vegeta sit on an iceberg, isolated from the celebration.

== Cast ==
Character name	Voice actor		
Character name	Japanese	English	
Character name	Japanese	Unknown/AB Groupe (c. 2001)	Funimation (2003)
Goku	Masako Nozawa	David Gasman	Sean Schemmel
Gohan	Masako Nozawa	Jodi Forrest	Stephanie Nadolny
Piccolo	Toshio Furukawa	Big Green	Christopher Sabat
Piccolo	Toshio Furukawa	Paul Bandey	Christopher Sabat
Kuririn	Mayumi Tanaka	Clearin	Krillin
Kuririn	Mayumi Tanaka	Sharon Mann	Sonny Strait
Future Trunks	Takeshi Kusao	Doug Rand	Eric Vale
Vegeta	Ryō Horikawa	Ed Marcus	Christopher Sabat
Android 13	Kazuyuki Sogabe	Doug Rand	Chuck Huber
Android 14	Hisao Egawa	Ed Marcus	Chris Rager
Android 15	Toshio Kobayashi	Paul Bandey	Josh Martin
Dr. Gero	Kōji Yada	Ed Marcus	Kent Williams
Kame-Sennin	Kōhei Miyauchi	Ed Marcus	Master Roshi
Kame-Sennin	Kōhei Miyauchi	Ed Marcus	Mike McFarland
Chi-Chi	Naoko Watanabe	Sharon Mann	Cynthia Cranz
Oolong	Naoki Tatsuta	David Gasman	Brad Jackson
Narrator	Jōji Yanami	Ed Marcus	Kyle Hebert

Note Android 13, 14 and 15 are characters on this article

For smartphone operating system see these, Android 13, Android 14, Android 15

A third English dub produced and released exclusively in Malaysia by Speedy Video features an unknown voice cast.

== Music ==
- OP (Opening Theme):
  - "Cha-La Head-Cha-La"
    - Lyrics by Yukinojō Mori
    - Music by Chiho Kiyooka
    - Arranged by Kenji Yamamoto
    - Performed by Hironobu Kageyama
- ED (Ending Theme):
  - Giri Giri Sekai Kyokugen (GIRI GIRI－世界極限－, "At the Brink: The Earth's Limit")
    - Lyrics by Dai Satō
    - Music by Chiho Kiyooka
    - Arranged by Kenji Yamamoto
    - Performed by Hironobu Kageyama & Yuka

=== English dub soundtrack ===
The score for the Funimation English dub was composed by Mark Menza. The "Double Feature" release contains an alternate audio track containing the English dub with original Japanese background music by Shunsuke Kikuchi, an opening theme of "Cha-La Head-Cha-La", and an ending theme of "At the Brink: The Earth's Limit" which was composed by Kenji Yamamoto.

== Releases ==
It was released on DVD and VHS in North America on February 4, 2003. It was later released in Double Feature set along with Bojack Unbound (1993) for Blu-ray and DVD on February 10, 2009, both feature full 1080p format in HD remastered 16:9 aspect ratio and an enhanced 5.1 surround mix. The film was re-released to DVD in remastered thinpak collection on December 6, 2011, containing the second four Dragon Ball Z films.
