= Piccolo (Dragon Ball) =

Fictional character from the Dragon Ball franchise

- Dragon Ball character
- Piccolo, as drawn by Akira Toriyama
- First appearance: Dragon Ball chapter #161 Son Goku Wins, February 9, 1988 (Weekly Shōnen Jump 1988)
- Created by: Akira Toriyama
- Voiced by: Japanese: Toshio Furukawa (adult); Hiromi Tsuru (child); Tomohiro Yamaguchi (mini; Dragon Ball Daima); English: Christopher Sabat (Funimation/Crunchyroll); Scott McNeil (Ocean Productions); Ray Chase (Bang Zoom!)

In-universe information
- Species: Namekian
- Gender: Genderless (Identifies male)
- Family: King Piccolo (parent/incarnate); Kami (good counterpart, later assimilated); Nail (assimilated)
- Apprentice: Gohan

Piccolo (Japanese: ピッコロ, Hepburn: Pikkoro) is a fictional character in the Japanese Dragon Ball media franchise created by Akira Toriyama. He made his appearance in chapter #161 "Son Goku Wins!!", published in Weekly Shōnen Jump magazine on February 9, 1988, as the reincarnation of the evil King Piccolo, who was positioned as a demonic antagonist of the series. However, it is later revealed that he is, in fact, a member of an extraterrestrial humanoid species called Namekians from an exoplanet called Namek, those able to create the series' eponymous wish-granting Dragon Balls. After losing to Son Goku in the World Martial Arts Tournament, Piccolo teams up with him and his friends to defeat newer, more dangerous and powerful threats, such as Vegeta, Frieza, Cell, Majin Buu, Beerus, Zamasu, Jiren, Broly, and Moro. He also trains Goku's eldest son, Gohan, and the two form a powerful bond.

Piccolo is one of the most popular and recognizable characters from the Dragon Ball franchise. The character has been consistently well received by fans and video game publications, with high placements in multiple "top" character lists and popularity polls. The character has also inspired Naruto manga author Masashi Kishimoto, as well as an Internet meme which became popular in Japan in 2013.

== Creation and development ==
Piccolo, more specifically his parent, King Piccolo, was created by Toriyama as he wanted to have a villain who would be a true "bad guy." Before his creation, nearly all the previous villains in the series were considered too likable. His editor, Kazuhiko Torishima, stated he introduced Toriyama to evil historical figures for inspiration. King Piccolo was created after he told the author how Roman Emperor Nero enjoyed watching people suffer. However, the Shenlong Times issue #2, a bonus pamphlet given to some buyers of the Daizenshuu 2: Story Guide guidebook, says that the character was modeled after Toriyama himself. After creating King Piccolo, Toriyama noted that it was one of the most interesting parts of the series and that he became one of his favorite characters. Although Piccolo's transformation from a villain to a hero was considered by Toriyama to be cliché, he still felt excited when drawing him, noting that despite having a scary face, he still looks appealing. When Toriyama was later asked in an interview, he admitted that Piccolo very soon grew to be his favorite character.

Piccolo is initially assumed to, like his parent, be a member of the Demon Clan (魔族, Mazoku); however, midway through the series, it is learned that they are actually members of the alien race called Namekians (ナメック星人, Namekku-seijin). Toriyama stated that he never thought of making Piccolo an alien until Kami was introduced. Until recently, Dragon Ball Daima has introduced that Namekians are now from the Demon Realm, an alternate universe of demons, making the whole race of Namekians a Demon race.

For the film Dragon Ball Super: Super Hero, Toriyama said that he wanted the plot to focus on the dynamic between Gohan and Piccolo due to how their close relationship motivates the former even more than his father, Goku, to be determined to fight. Orange Piccolo (オレンジ・ピッコロ, Orenji Pikkoro), which Toriyama considers Piccolo's first transformation, was made orange and extremely muscled to distinguish him from Piccolo's regular form. The buffed body was done since, unlike other characters, Piccolo does not have hair to change in a transformation. Toriyama wondered that while he should have been more over-the-top with Piccolo, he is glad he finally gave him a chance to make him as strong as Goku. Toriyama said that, while Piccolo is a stoic character, he wanted to make him act different in the movie.

=== Voice actors ===
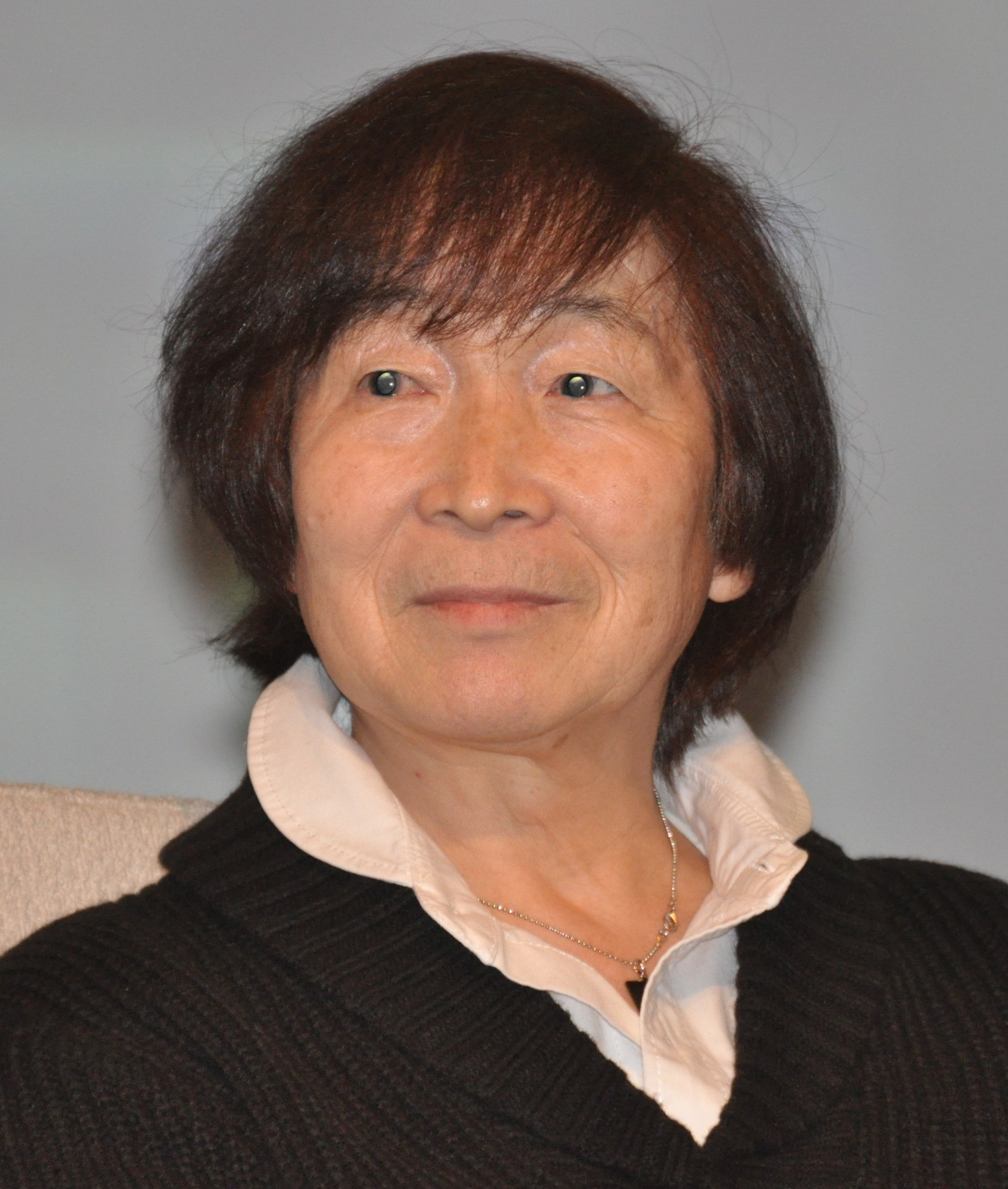
Toshio Furukawa has been adult Piccolo's Japanese voice actor in most pieces of Dragon Ball media

In the original Japanese version of the anime and all other media, Piccolo is voiced by Toshio Furukawa, with the only two exceptions being his initial newborn child form which was voiced by Hiromi Tsuru, and in Dragon Ball Daima, where a mini version of Piccolo was voiced by Tomohiro Yamaguchi. Furukawa, who up to that point had mostly played happy lighter-voiced characters, said he got the role because he stated in interviews at the time that he wanted to play a villain. He said it was difficult to constantly perform with a low voice because his normal lighter voice would break through if he broke concentration. When asked if Takeshi Aono's work as King Piccolo influenced his portrayal of Piccolo, Furukawa replied that because King Piccolo was impulsive, he initially played his own role as an energetic person around eighteen-years-old and later imagined him as close to thirty-years-old in Dragon Ball Z. Furukawa, as well as Gohan's voice actress Masako Nozawa, said the episodes where Piccolo trains Gohan left an impression on them. He said the fans really enjoyed those episodes as well. Furukawa also cited Piccolo making a pun for King Kai as memorable because it was so out of character for him. By the time he reprised the voice in Dragon Ball Super, Piccolo had become Furukawa's favorite character of all his roles.

In English, several different voice actors have voiced Piccolo, including Scott McNeil in episodes 1-53 (1-67 unedited) in Funimation Entertainment's initial dub of Dragon Ball Z in association with Saban Entertainment and Ocean Productions as well as Geneon's dub of the first three Dragon Ball Z films, and episodes 108-291 of Westwood Media's dub of the franchise (in association with Ocean Productions); by Ethan Cole in Chinook Animation's dub of Dragon Ball GT (produced in association with Blue Water Studios); by British-born French actor Paul Bandey in the infamous English dubs of the movies released exclusively in the UK and the Netherlands by AB Groupe (wherein the character was referred to as "Big Green"), by David Gasman (who also voiced Goku in this dub) in the European dub of Dead Zone (there called In Pursuit of Garlic), vocal grunts by Ed Marcus in The History of Trunks (or Gohan and Trunks) and consistently by Christopher Sabat in Funimation's in-house dub of all Dragon Ball media. Ray Chase voices Piccolo in the Toonami Asia broadcast of Dragon Ball Super produced by Bang Zoom! Entertainment.

== Abilities ==
Piccolo has shown many unique abilities throughout the series. Due to his Namekian physiology, Piccolo can expand his arms, move fast enough to not be seen, regenerate lost limbs of his body so long as his head is still intact, and possesses superhuman hearing and strength. Piccolo's Chōkyoshinjutsu (超巨身術; "Super Large Body Technique", or "Super Giantification Spell" in Viz's manga) allows him to become gigantic to the point where he is capable of reaching mountain-like heights. He can also conjure objects such as garments and a blade, including his cape and turban outfit. Among Piccolo's known psionic skills, he is able to communicate telepathically with select individuals. Thus, this enables him to read minds and mentally contact others nearby. In one instance, he alerts Goten and Trunks of Buu's proximity to the dimension where the two were training. Piccolo's range of abilities is very wide, an example of this is in Dragon Ball Super: Super Hero, when Piccolo is battling Cell Max, Piccolo forgets one of his abilities until Krillin reminds him, specifically, Piccolo's previously mentioned "Super Large Body Technique" that he had used only in the original series.

Like many other characters in Dragon Ball, Piccolo has the ability of flight through the technique called Bukū-jutsu (舞空術; lit. 'Air Dance Technique'). He also possesses an attack called the Bakuretsumaha (爆裂魔波; lit. "Exploding Wave", or "Destructive Wave" in the English anime dub), which is fired with one hand being supported by the other. One of Piccolo's most powerful attacks is the Makankōsappō (魔貫光殺砲; lit. "Demonic Screw Light Cannon", "Light of Death" in Viz's manga or "Special Beam Cannon" in the English anime dub) an attack that is expelled from Piccolo's index and middle fingers. Unlike most energy-based attacks in Dragon Ball, the potent Makankōsappō pierces its targets like a drill rather than enveloping them or exploding on contact. Another attack of Piccolo's is the Renzoku Sen Kōdan (連続閃光弾; lit. "Repeated Flash Bullets", "Hellzone Grenade" in English media), which involves firing off many orbs of energy that float around the opponent. Piccolo then squeezes his hand to make all the orbs converge onto the opponent, exploding on contact. The Masenkō (魔閃光; lit. 'Demon Flash') is another of his signature attacks, being one that he teaches to his pupil Gohan. Another move Piccolo is seen to have is the Gekiretsu Kodan (激烈光弾; lit. "Violent Light Grenade", simply "Light Grenade" in the English anime dub) which is conjured by putting his hands on his chest, gathering energy, and then releasing it outwards. One of Piccolo's less frequently used techniques is the ability to fire energy rays from his eyes, which he first uses against Krillin's energy attack during their match in the 23rd Tenkaichi Budōkai, then later against Goku in the finals, and again when he trains Gohan. It is also revealed that he is capable of performing the Mafūba (魔封波; lit. "Demon Sealing Wave", "Evil Containment Wave" in the English versions), and invented by Master Mutaito to seal his evil parent in a rice cooker, and can reverse this technique, using it against his good counterpart.

Piccolo can also perform a type of fusion, which he does with Nail on planet Namek to confront Frieza and with Kami to confront the Androids, each time greatly increasing his power; the first time enough to clash toe-to-toe with Frieza's second form, and in the latter, he becomes much more powerful than an unmastered "Super Saiyan". In this form, which was before the original Piccolo and Kami separated known as a "Nameless Namekian", he was able to fight on par with Android 17.

In Dragon Ball Super: Super Hero, Piccolo has Dende upgrade the earth's Dragon Balls, allowing Shenron to grant a potential unlock similar to the Grand Elder Guru's power in Dragon Ball Z. This results in him gaining a yellow Potential Unleashed transformation. Against Gamma 2, it is revealed that the "extra" power-up that Shenron had given earlier was a new form, Orange Piccolo.

== Appearances ==
=== Dragon Ball ===
Introduced as the offspring and reincarnation of King Piccolo, Piccolo Jr. plans to continue his parents' mission of world domination and avenge his death at the hands of Goku. Piccolo enters the 23rd Tenkaichi Budōkai under the alias "Demon Junior" (マジュニア, Majunia). Piccolo defeats both Krillin, who gives up, and Kami, by reversing the Evil Containment Wave and sealing Kami in the container intended for Piccolo. He then fights Goku in the final round, who tricks Piccolo into enlarging himself so he can retrieve Kami, from there causing many of Piccolo's techniques to backfire on him. Though crippling both Goku's arms and legs, Piccolo is defeated when Goku headbutts him out of the ring, though recovers thanks to receiving a Senzu bean from Goku, who he promises to defeat as he departs.

=== Dragon Ball Z ===
Five years later, Piccolo teams up with Goku to defeat his older brother Raditz. Piccolo defeats Raditz, but at the cost of Goku's life, as Piccolo's move Makankōsappō cuts through both Saiyans. Piccolo's subsequent conversation with the dying Raditz, in which he reveals that the Dragon Balls can resurrect, is broadcast. Piccolo remains amazed by Gohan's powers and trains him to prepare for the fight against the two Saiyans who will invade Earth. As the year goes by, Piccolo starts to change as he spends time training Gohan, slowly beginning to bond with him. When the Saiyans arrive a year later, Piccolo discovers his heritage from the planet Namek. In the fight against Nappa, Piccolo sacrifices himself to protect Gohan from the attack, resulting in the deaths of both himself and Kami. After the Saiyans are defeated, Gohan and the survivors travel to Piccolo's homeworld, Namek, to revive those who died against the Saiyans with the Namekian Dragon Balls. In the meantime, Piccolo trains in the afterlife with King Kai. Piccolo is resurrected on planet Namek to help Goku and others defeat the evil Frieza. He takes this time to merge with the beaten Namekian called Nail, giving Piccolo a power increase. The power increase allows him to go head-to-head with Frieza's second transformation. However, the plan fails as Frieza reveals the full extent of his powers. In Frieza's following fight with Goku, who tries charging a Genki-Dama to defeat him, Piccolo assists him alongside Gohan and Krillin. Once Frieza emerges from the impact of the Genki-Dama unscathed, Piccolo is severely injured by Frieza with a shot to the chest. Piccolo is later teleported off the planet to safety on Earth and, after regaining consciousness, declines to return to a new version of Namek as he wishes to protect Gohan and become stronger while remaining on Earth.

After Frieza's death, Piccolo trains with Goku and Gohan for three years to prepare for a battle against two powerful Androids created by the Red Ribbon Army's Doctor Gero to kill Goku. Though he manages to best Gero in battle, he is unable to prevent him from activating the other Androids. After being defeated by Android 17, Piccolo seeks to unite with Kami and gain another massive increase in power. Piccolo becomes aware of a more dangerous threat named Cell, who seeks to absorb #17 and #18. After Cell escapes, Piccolo once again battles the Androids, except this time he battles #17 one-on-one. After a somewhat even match, Cell arrives on the battle scene; Cell needs to absorb the Androids to complete his power. While trying to prevent this, Piccolo is nearly killed by Cell, surviving the encounter thanks to his regenerative abilities and following some training in the Room of Spirit and Time, he is forced to participate in a tournament created by Cell called the Cell Games, where he fights one of the seven Cell Juniors that are created by Cell, who are later destroyed by Gohan.

Seven years later, Piccolo is poised to fight the Supreme Kai at the 25th Tenkaichi Budōkai, forfeiting the match after finding himself reluctant to fight and journeying with him to confront Babidi, being turned into stone by Dabura. After being freed upon Dabura's death, he attempts to kill Babidi. Piccolo discovers that Babidi survived. Babidi later demands that Piccolo be brought forward, or humans will die in the meantime. Piccolo then acts as a trainer to Goten and Trunks and their fused form, Gotenks. Piccolo trains the boys to fight the evil creature Majin Buu, who finds them and the other heroes. After more unsuccessful attempts to kill Buu, he is later absorbed by Buu along with Gotenks and Gohan and dies when Buu destroys the Earth He is then revived through the Dragon Balls and aids Goku's Genki-Dama attack, which Goku uses to defeat Buu once and for all.

=== Dragon Ball Super ===
In Dragon Ball Z: Battle of Gods, Piccolo combats Beerus alongside Android 18 and Tien Shinhan, only to be bested; and, in Dragon Ball Z: Resurrection 'F', Piccolo narrowly escapes death once Frieza destroys the Earth. After the events of the latter two films, Piccolo is resurrected after being killed by Frieza in the Dragon Ball Super retelling of Resurrection 'F' and agrees to train Gohan again. Piccolo then accepts a request to participate in a tournament against Universe 6 fighters, where his loss to Frost is retracted after cheating on Frost's part is discovered, though he still declines being allowed to fight more as Vegeta wants to take his place. After this, Piccolo reunites with Trunks and teaches him a technique to defeat his enemy. In the final arc of the anime, Piccolo participates in a fighting tournament after training Gohan once again.

After these events, in Dragon Ball Super: Broly, Piccolo, standing by an unknown location, telepathically senses Goku having trouble fighting the titular character, and after he and Vegeta transport themselves to Piccolo via Shunkan Idō, later assists them into performing the Fusion technique successfully after two failed, hilarious attempts. The newly christened Gogeta then leaves to stop Broly.

Shortly after, during the Moro arc, Piccolo joins the Z fighters in their fight against Moro and his henchmen when they arrive on Earth. During the battle with Moro, Piccolo is critically wounded but can recover with a Senzu bean. At the end of the battle, Piccolo is one of the many heroes who lend their power to Goku, enabling him to defeat Moro once and for all.

Years later in Dragon Ball Super: Super Hero, Piccolo, after training Pan and visiting Gohan, is ambushed by android Gamma 2 and is defeated, evading death and detection afterward. He then discovers the resurrected Red Ribbon Army and its ulterior motives while disguised. Through a wish from the Dragon Balls, Shenlong unlocks Piccolo's potential, taking on an empowered state similar to that of his pupil's Potential Unleashed (潜在能力解放, Senzai Nōryoku Kaihō) form, and has Pan play along with a plan to sabotage the army's ploy and put Gohan back in fighting spirit. He then ascends to his first true transformation as a "little extra" from the dragon, referred to as "Orange Piccolo" (オレンジ・ピッコロ, Orenji Pikkoro). He battles the monstrous Cell Max giant-to-giant, but is severely outmatched and injured, causing Gohan to awaken a new power through fury. He then restrains the monster for Beast Gohan to pierce his forehead with a fatal Makankōsappō.

Shortly after the events of Super Hero, Goku returns to Earth with Gohan, Goten, Trunks, and Vegeta. Goku and Piccolo briefly discuss the new form Piccolo achieved before they pick up Pan from school.

== In other media ==
Piccolo appears in nine non-canonical Dragon Ball Z films; in the first movie, Piccolo aids in stopping Garlic Jr.'s plot after having been attacked by his minions, wanting revenge; in the second, Piccolo is brainwashed by Dr. Wheelo and made to combat the others until Gohan frees him by destroying the machinery associated with his brainwashing; in the third, Piccolo comes to save Gohan from Turles and succeeds by taking a blast for him; in the fourth, Piccolo combats Lord Slug and discovers that Namekians are weak to whistling, allowing for his defeat; in the fifth, Piccolo is able to defeat most of Cooler's squadron, only to be defeated by Cooler himself; in the sixth, Piccolo fights Cooler's minions on Namek and saves the others after they are captured; in the seventh, Piccolo saves Gohan from being attacked by Android 13 and battles the android in both his forms; in the eighth, Piccolo travels to New Planet Vegeta and fights Broly, giving his energy to Goku which leads to the foe's defeat; in the ninth, Piccolo comes to help the others fight Bojack and his crew.

In filler episodes of Dragon Ball Z, during the Saiyan arc, Piccolo strands Gohan on an island, losing his location in the process, and appears to Gohan after he turns down returning home, taking him back to his training. After the Namek arc, Piccolo appears to help Gohan and Krillin when they are attacked by their friends who are under the effects of the Black Water Mist. In battling the group, Piccolo seemingly falls victim and appears on Kami's Lookout, where Gohan and Krillin travel to stop Garlic Jr., to halt the pair. After appearing to infect Krillin too and he and Piccolo overwhelm Gohan, Piccolo reveals to Gohan that he had been pretending the entire time and battles Garlic Jr. until his defeat. Piccolo and Goku are later made to get driver's licenses by Chi-Chi. Following the Buu arc, Piccolo attends a gathering. Piccolo has appeared in other Dragon Ball animations barring the series and films; in Dragon Ball Z Side Story: Plan to Eradicate the Saiyans, Piccolo defeats Lord Slug and Hatchiyak and in Dragon Ball: Yo! Son Goku and His Friends Return!!, Piccolo prevents Aka's Wahaha no Ha from destroying Satan Hotel.

In the anime-only sequel Dragon Ball GT, Piccolo arrives to recover Goten after Baby ceases possessing him and moves to Gohan. Piccolo confronts the Baby-possessed Gohan and is injured. After Baby is defeated, Piccolo sacrifices himself to put the Black Star Dragon Balls to rest and bring peace to the world. He goes to Heaven but then requests to be sent to Hell to free Goku when he is imprisoned there. He can be seen putting Hell in order and protecting the rulers there. Goku later stops in Hell to see Piccolo. He tells Piccolo that he will be leaving and that they are glad they met and teamed up. Goku also tells Piccolo that he had become a good friend and promised to get him out of Hell someday. They shake hands, and Goku leaves while Piccolo stays behind.

Piccolo has made multiple appearances in music. "I Lo~ve Mr. Piccolo" appears on the 1990 album Dragon Ball Z Hit Song Collection III: Space Dancing, Gohan singing about his admiration for Piccolo and wondering what his species is. In the 1991 album Dragon Ball Z Hit Song Collection 8: Character Special 2, the song "The Feeling of Whistling Piccolo Edit" features Piccolo complaining and begging for a whistler to stop exploiting his weakness before he departs. Piccolo is also mentioned in the song "Goku" by Soulja Boy, who brags about feeling like Piccolo and multiple other Dragon Ball characters, and in the song "Break Bread" by Bryson Tiller, with the verse "Got green like Piccolo".

In the 2006 Dragon Ball and One Piece crossover manga Cross Epoch, Piccolo appears as a swordsman alongside Roronoa Zoro. In the 2013 special Dream 9 Toriko & One Piece & Dragon Ball Z Super Collaboration Special (ドリーム9 トリコ&ワンピース&ドラゴンボールZ 超コラボスペシャル!), Piccolo cheers on Goku in his match against Monkey D. Luffy and Toriko. In an episode of Mad parodying the film Moneyball, Piccolo and other Dragon Ball characters are drafted by Billy Beane into the Oakland A baseball team.

=== Video games ===
Piccolo has been in many Dragon Ball-related video games such as Super Butōden, the Budokai and Budokai Tenkaichi series of games, as well as Dragon Ball Z: Infinite World and Dragon Ball Z: Burst Limit. In several games, Piccolo has exclusive forms such as Majin or fusions with Maima, Tsumuri, Dende, Dr. Mashirito, and King Piccolo, which drastically increase his power.

Piccolo appears in multiple story modes in the 2006 game Dragon Ball Z: Supersonic Warriors 2. In Gohan's story, Piccolo is turned evil by a blast from Babidi and becomes the leader of Buu and Dabura. After fighting Gohan, he flees and absorbs Buu, increasing his power. Piccolo then announces via television his intent to take over the world, and partners with Cell and Frieza before being defeated by Gohan.

In the 2011 game Dragon Ball Z: Ultimate Tenkaichi, Piccolo is defeated by Baby, encountering and battling the player while training, causing the player's Super Saiyan transformation and their subsequent overpowering of him. After he is defeated, Piccolo resolves to train the player.

In the 2015 game Dragon Ball: Xenoverse, Piccolo appears as a mentor. Within the story mode, Piccolo fights the player while under the control of Demigra, and in the final battle against Demigra, Piccolo gives the player his energy.

In the 2016 game Dragon Ball Xenoverse 2, Piccolo and Android 16 are defeated by Villainous Mode Imperfect Cell, allowing him to absorb #17 and #18 at the same time. The player then comes to assist Piccolo in his fight against Cell.

In the 2018 game Dragon Ball FighterZ, Piccolo is found unconscious by Goku and Krillin, and agrees to help them fight off clones and discover their origins upon waking up. Piccolo joins the two in finding Gohan and Vegeta, and uses his Makankōsappō to participate in destroying Android 21.

He is a playable character in some crossover games such as Jump Super Stars, Jump Ultimate Stars, and Jump Force.

== Cultural impact ==
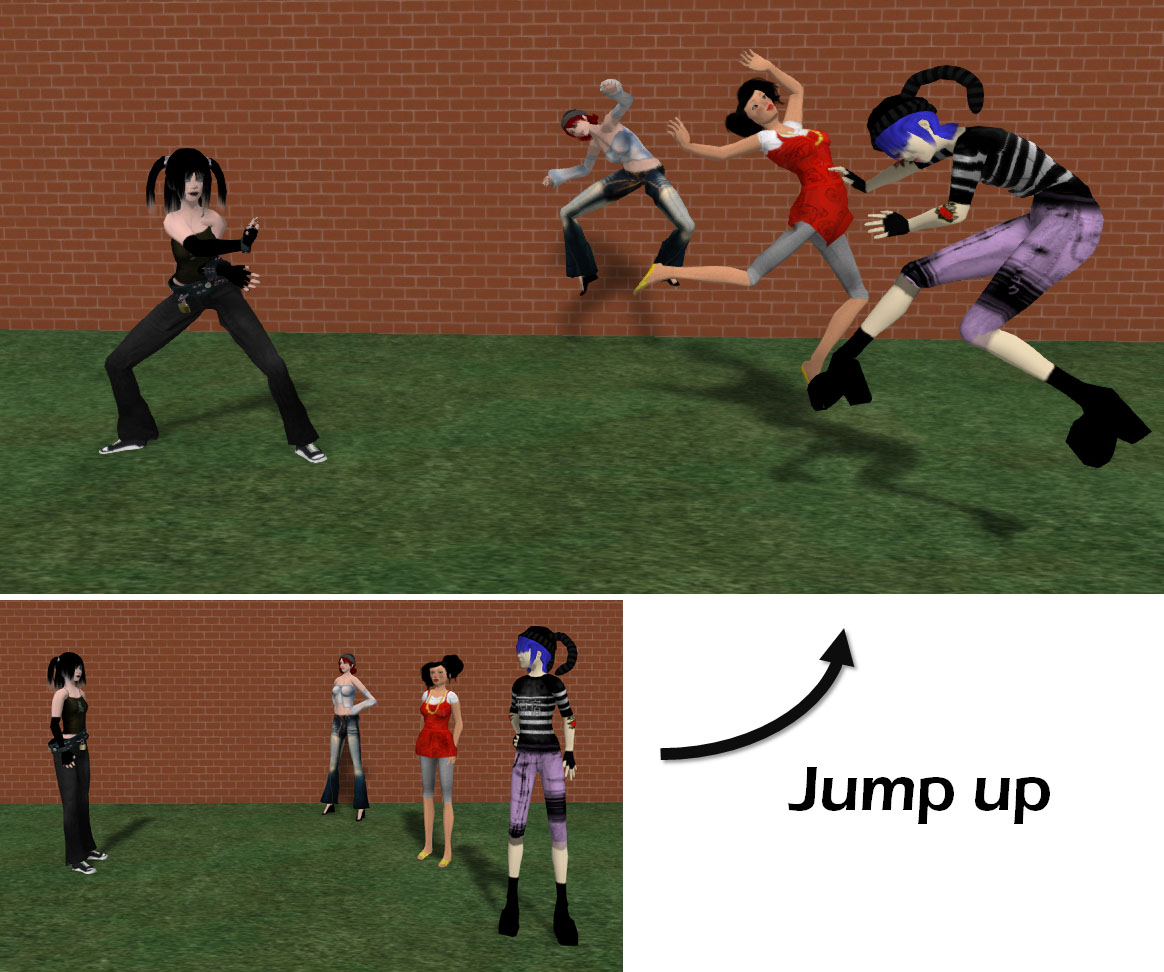
An illustration of the Makankōsappō meme

The character has influenced Naruto manga author Masashi Kishimoto; in order to give Sasuke Uchiha a central role in the film Boruto: Naruto the Movie, Kishimoto made him the teacher of the protagonist Boruto Uzumaki as his father, Naruto Uzumaki, was busy. This was inspired by how Piccolo starts training Gohan when Goku dies in Dragon Ball. The dynamic between game characters Sonic the Hedgehog and Tails from Sonic the Hedgehog 2 was based on Piccolo and Gohan's dynamic too.

Piccolo's attack Special Beam Cannon / Makankōsappō became a meme that started with Japanese schoolgirls photographing themselves using and being affected by this attack in 2013. According to gaming blog Kotaku, the trend took off after photos were posted on Japan's largest bulletin board 2channel (commonly known as "5channel" or "2ch.sc", not to be confused with an unrelated Japanese image board known as "Futaba Channel" or "2chan", which is based on the original 2channel software), with photographs typically showing one person striking the ground or making a mystical gesture while others around them are photographically captured in mid-air. The meme is also called "Hadouken-ing" after the Street Fighter move of the same name, which is done in a similar fashion.

=== Reception ===
Piccolo is a popular character in the series. He placed fifth in both the 1993 and 1995 Dragon Ball character popularity polls voted on by Weekly Shōnen Jump readers. In 2004, fans of the series voted him the fifth most popular character for a poll in the book Dragon Ball Forever. Piccolo has appeared in various Anime Grand Prix polls, taking high places in the category "best male character" in 1990, 1991 and 1992 polls.

Piccolo's character has received praise and criticism from publications in various media. DVDTalk enjoyed Piccolo's malicious characterization which, in retrospect, makes a major contrast with his more mature portrayal from Dragon Ball Z. During a review of the Dragon Ball anime, Chris Beveridge from Mania Entertainment noted Piccolo to be able to perform a large number of abilities in contrast to other characters such as Goku, making the fight between both of them unbalanced. However, he found the said battle to be very entertaining despite it lasting several episodes. Tim Jones from THEM Anime Reviews found Piccolo's differences from Dragon Ball to Dragon Ball Z as one of the reasons the former show is recommendable to viewers over the later anime. While reviewing the fourth Dragon Ball Z film, Anime News Network writer Allen Drivers found Piccolo's initial scenes peacefully enough to entertain viewers. In a later film, John Sinnott from DVD Talk criticized Piccolo's involvement saying he appears "from out of nowhere" in order to fight alongside his friends giving the film little reasoning. Chris Homer from The Fandom Post believed Piccolo's sacrifice in Dragon Ball GT "was a genuine touching moment" for fans of Dragon Ball Z, but also viewed the death as relying "too much on previous ideas" in order for it to get sorted. Beveridge praised Piccolo's growth in Dragon Ball Z as one of the most important parts of the series, noting how he decides to train Gohan to fight Vegeta.

Although Katherine Luther from About.com noted Piccolo to be one of the strongest warriors from his planet, she mentioned he has several weaknesses that make him weaker than other characters from the series, with his most notable one being his affection for Gohan. Sam Leach from Anime News Network noted that some fans of the series tend to joke that Piccolo is a better paternal figure to Gohan than his actual father, Goku, and felt that Dragon Ball Super emphasized it more when Piccolo started training him again. Piccolo's return in Super Hero earned similar comments from Polygon due to how he continues his role as Gohan's guardian and takes a more civilized way of living to stay close to him and train. As a result of these events in the movie, Polygon claimed that he was the best father in the entire franchise and that Gohan honors him during the film, most notably in the climax. Anime News Network praised Piccolo's characterization from Super Hero as he comes across as a more appealing character. IGN also enjoyed the handling of Piccolo and his dynamic with Gohan as the duo is as entertaining as the previous protagonist they are replacing, Goku and Vegeta, and praise Piccolo's paternal figure to Gohan as he works to make his disciple stronger and was also found charming. However, the fact that the new androids can rival Piccolo and Gohan so easily came across as forced and at the same time as common in the franchise due to how power levels are often exaggerated. Piccolo's relationship with Pan as he trains her well as his new Orange power up were praised by HobbyConsolas with the latter being linked with Western superheroes. In regards to the film's presentation, GameSpot claimed that Piccolo and Gohan are the best CGI designed characters contrasting with poor models used for Goku and Vegeta and also found charming the awkward way Piccolo interacts with the rest of the characters such as when he uses a cellphone in a strange position and noted that the film made him more attached with the rest of the cast.
