= Kenji Yamamoto (composer, born 1958) =

Japanese composer and arranger (born 1958)

Kenji Yamamoto 山本 健司
- Born: July 1, 1958 (age 68); Japan
- Occupations: Composer, arranger
- Years active: 1987–2011

Kenji Yamamoto (山本 健司, Yamamoto Kenji; born July 1, 1958) is a Japanese composer and arranger who has been responsible for producing and composing soundtracks, including opening and ending sequence themes for various anime, tokusatsu and video game projects in the 1980s, 1990s, and 2000s, mostly related to the Dragon Ball franchise. He has worked on soundtracks of various Dragon Ball video games.

Yamamoto has also composed background music for Dragon Ball Z Kai, a revamped version of the anime series Dragon Ball Z. On March 9, 2011, Toei Animation publicly acknowledged that many of Yamamoto's musical works for the series infringed upon unidentified third-party copyrights. As a result, Toei fired Yamamoto and replaced his compositions with those from the original Dragon Ball Z series written by Shunsuke Kikuchi. The plagiarism of these works has been known to fans since May 2010. Due to the discovery of plagiarism in his compositions by Toei, they were replaced in Dragon Ball Z: Budokai HD Collection and later copies of Dragon Ball: Raging Blast 2. Since then, a limited pre-order bonus releases, based on the Super Famicom games of Dragon Ball Z: Super Butōden (Switch version) and Dragon Ball Z: Super Butōden 2 (3DS version) would replace the music in the 16-bit era.

== Works ==
Title	Role
Aitsu to Lullaby	Soundtrack; with Satoshi Kadokura and Takashi Kudou
Dragon Ball Z	Arranged and composed songs from the Dragon Ball Z Hit Song Collection and arranged "Cha-La Head-Cha-La" and "Detekoi Tobikiri Zenkai Power!"
Dragon Ball Z: Super Android 13	Arranged the end credits song "At the Brink: The Earth's Limit"
Harbor Light Story Fashion Lala Yori	Soundtrack
Dragon Ball Z: Super Butōden	Soundtrack
Dragon Ball Z: Super Butōden 2	Soundtrack
Dragon Ball Z: Super Butōden 3	Soundtrack
Dragon Ball Z Super Gokuden: Totsugeki-Hen	Soundtrack
Dragon Ball Z Super Gokuden: Kakusei-Hen	Soundtrack
Dragon Ball Z: Ultimate Battle 22	Soundtrack
Dragon Ball Z: Shin Butōden	Soundtrack
Dragon Ball Z: The Legend	Soundtrack
Dragon Ball GT: Final Bout	Soundtrack
Ultra Nyan: Extraordinary Cat who Descended from the Starry Sky	Soundtrack
Dr. Slump (1999 video game)	Soundtrack
Bakuryū Sentai Abaranger	Soundtrack; with Kentaro Haneda, Kousuke Yamashita, Hiroshi Takaki and Megumi Oohashi
Dragon Ball Z: Budokai	Soundtrack
Dragon Ball Z: Budokai 2	Soundtrack
Dragon Ball Z: Budokai 3	Soundtrack
Dragon Ball Z: Shin Budokai	Soundtrack
Dragon Ball Z: Shin Budokai - Another Road	Soundtrack
Dragon Ball Z: Burst Limit	Soundtrack
Dragon Ball Z: Infinite World	Soundtrack
Dragon Ball: Raging Blast 2	Soundtrack
Dragon Ball Z Kai	Soundtrack (episodes 1–95)
Dragon Ball Z: Dokkan Battle	Soundtrack
Dragon Ball Xenoverse (Network Test)	Soundtrack
