= Revista Oficial Nintendo =

Spanish magazine

- Editor: Alex Alcolea
- Editor: David Alonso
- Editor: Antonio Carrizosa
- Editor: Lázaro Fernández
- Editor: Samuel González
- Editor: Raúl García
- Categories: Video game industry
- Frequency: Monthly
- Circulation: 30.070 copies
- Publisher: Axel Springer España
- Founded: 1992
- First issue: December 1992; 33 years ago
- Final issue Number: December 17, 2018; 316
- Company: Axel Springer España S.A.
- Country: Spain
- Based in: Official Nintendo Magazine
- Language: Spanish
- Website: store.axelspringer.es/videojuegos/revistas-videojuegos/revista-oficial-nintendo

Revista Oficial Nintendo (formerly Nintendo Acción) was a Spanish magazine about Nintendo. It was released in December 1992 by HobbyPress. In 2016 it voiced 8.100.000 euros and lost 200.000 euros. It was discontinued on 14 December 2018 due to low sales, after 26 years and 316 issues published.
