= Gohan =

Fictional character in Dragon Ball

Son Gohan
- Dragon Ball character
- Gohan, as drawn by Akira Toriyama
- First appearance: Dragon Ball chapter #196 "Kakarrot", October 8, 1988 (Weekly Shōnen Jump 1988)
- Created by: Akira Toriyama
- Voiced by: Masako Nozawa (Japanese); Kyle Hebert (English)

In-universe information
- Aliases: The Great Saiyaman; The Golden Warrior
- Species: Saiyan-human hybrid
- Occupation: Entomologist
- Family: Piccolo (surrogate father); Chi-Chi (mother); Goten (younger brother)
- Spouse: Videl (wife)
- Children: Pan (daughter)
- Relatives: Mr. Satan (father-in-law); Miguel (mother-in-law); Bardock (grandfather figure; Gine (paternal grandmother); Ox-King (maternal grandfather); Ox Queen (maternal grandmother); Raditz (possible uncle); Son Goku Jr. (great-great-great-grandson; Dragon Ball GT)

Son Gohan (Japanese: 孫 悟飯) is a fictional character in the Japanese franchise Dragon Ball created by Akira Toriyama. The elder son of Son Goku and Chi-Chi, he made his appearance in chapter #196 "Kakarrot", published in Weekly Shōnen Jump magazine on October 8, 1988.

Chi-Chi is a strict and protective mother to Gohan, forcing him to focus on school and forbidding him from practicing martial arts. However, due to the various threats to the Earth, she reluctantly allows him to fight. Gohan is initially trained by his father's former nemesis Piccolo, ultimately becoming one of the strongest characters in the series due to his hidden potential, awakened by his rage.

Akira Toriyama originally aimed for Gohan to succeed Goku as the series' protagonist, but that idea was scrapped in the manga's final arc. Nevertheless, Toriyama used him as a lead in the film Dragon Ball Super: Super Hero, to reuse his dynamic with Piccolo. In Japanese, he is voiced by Masako Nozawa in all animated appearances and most media.

Gohan has been well received by both fans and critics, the latter usually citing the character's growth from his initial appearance to his defeat of Cell. However, his characterization after the Cell arc has received a more mixed reception. His return as a protagonist in Super Hero earned a better response for his continuous growth and role as a family man, aided by Piccolo.

== Creation and design ==
Gohan's name comes from the Japanese word gohan (ご飯, lit. "cooked rice" or "meal of any sort"), a continuation of the naming scheme of foods by Toriyama. Rice, being a grain, is not normally considered to be a vegetable, even though it is a common food. However, as the word "vegetable" is a culinary term, and not a botanical term, the name can also continue the naming scheme for Saiyan characters, which derives names from puns on vegetables. In conceptualizing for Gohan's character, Toriyama originally included glasses or a jacket in his apparel, and commonly, his hair is spiked up as seen in the final design. With the ending of the Cell arc, Gohan was meant to replace his father as the protagonist. However, Toriyama later decided against it, finding the character unsuited for the role in comparison to his father.

In contrast, Gohan is the main focus of the film Super Hero. The movie is meant to change the focus of overpowered characters like Goku and Vegeta against Broly in the previous film, and instead focus on Gohan and Piccolo as leads and thus bringing a change of pace. One of the main fights is between Gohan and Gamma 1, which takes place during the rain. Director Tetsuro Kodama found that this setting would be appealing. The narrative will further explore human drama, most notably the characterization of Gohan being a warrior as well as a scholar at the same time. Toriyama said that he wanted the plot to focus on the dynamic between Gohan and Piccolo due to how their close relationship is the one thing that motivates the former even more than his father, Goku, to be determined to fight. The film reveals the full awakening of Gohan's power through yet another instance of pure rage. This "Beast" form (孫 悟飯・ビースト, Son Gohan Bīsuto) is a culmination of his history of volcanic awakenings throughout his life. Toriyama feared it would come across as scary due to his angry expression, but tried balancing it with the hair, ultimately settling on a more simplistic approach.

In an interview featured in the second Dragon Ball GT Perfect Files, a companion book released in December 1997 by Shueisha's Jump Comics Selection imprint, Masako Nozawa, Gohan's voice actress, stated that her favorite episode voicing Gohan was "Sorry, Robot-san – The Desert of Vanishing Tears". Saffron Henderson, Gohan's original English voice actor, has stated she felt protective of the role and considers it to be one of her favorites. In addition, Gohan's original Funimation voice actor, Stephanie Nadolny has said that playing Gohan was a unique and much-loved experience.

=== Voice actors ===
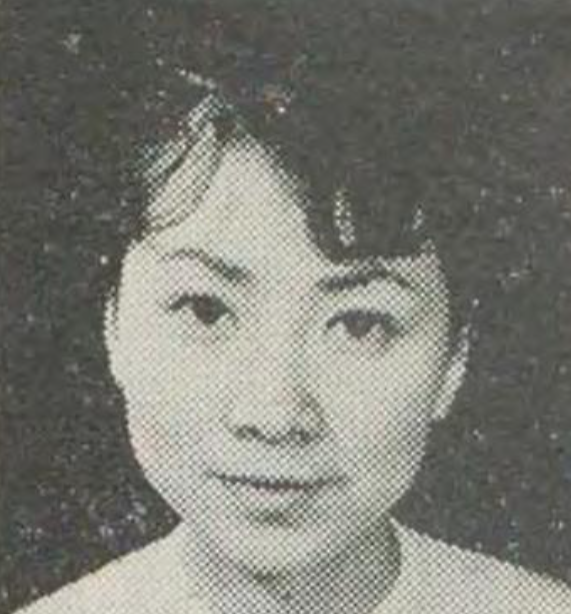
Masako Nozawa has been Gohan's Japanese voice actress in every single piece of Dragon Ball media.

Gohan is voiced in the original Japanese anime and all other media by Masako Nozawa. Nozawa, who also voices Goku, revealed that she did not know she would be playing Gohan until receiving the script on the day of recording his debut episode. Despite having to voice Gohan, Goku, Goten, and Bardock, Nozawa claims she can instantly get into the respective characters simply upon seeing their image.

In the Funimation and Saban Entertainment initial 1996 English dub of Dragon Ball Z, Gohan is voiced by Saffron Henderson. Henderson reprised her role in AB Group and Westwood Media's alternate dub for the UK and Canadian markets in 2000. Jillian Michaels replaced Henderson in the latter part of the Cell arc, while his adult version is voiced by Brad Swaile. Henderson believed her experience playing Goku in Dragon Ball made it simple to develop Gohan's voice, though she stressed performing as him was "tiring" due to the action of the series requiring louder volumes. She also remembered scheduling conflicts thanks to her wedding, setting the stage for the studio to audition other voice actors for the part of Gohan, and being disappointed at the role being recast.

In Funimation's in-house dub, Gohan's child incarnation is voiced by Stephanie Nadolny for various media until 2010 and Colleen Clinkenbeard for Dragon Ball Kai and later media while his adult incarnation is voiced by Kyle Hebert for almost all various media and Dameon Clarke as "Future Gohan" for some episodes and the History of Trunks TV special. Nadolny was called in to audition in 1999, when the English dub of Dragon Ball Z was recast. She said her most challenging time voicing the character was during his fight against Cell, where she had to make him sound as "deep, tough, and as much like a man as possible." Nadolny's voice was strained during the recordings, causing her to sometimes leave the studio in pain. Hebert said that his roles as Gohan and the narrator of Dragon Ball Z are close to him as they kickstarted his career. He also found Battle of Gods to be "genuinely touching" outside of its fighting, citing Gohan finding out that he was going to be a father among the moments he found sentimental and was happy to return to the franchise when reprising his role in Resurrection 'F', also expressing interest in redoing his lines in Dragon Ball Kai as he had more experience.

In the English dub of Dragon Ball GT produced by Blue Water Studios, distributed in Canada, he was voiced by Scott Roberts. In the English dub of movies distributed in Europe by AB Groupe, Gohan was voiced by Jodi Forrest, with David Gasman voicing Gohan as an adult in The History of Trunks. In the Toonami Asia dub produced by Bang Zoom! Entertainment of Dragon Ball Super, Gohan here is voiced by Chris Hackney.

In a rare English dub of the anime produced in the Philippines by Creative Products Corporation, Gohan was voiced by Ethel Lizano, who also directed that dub. In the 1996 dub of the double feature combining Cooler's Revenge and The Return of Cooler also by Creative Products Corp.; young Gohan was voiced by E.J. Galang, who was 12 years old at the time he voiced Gohan.

== Abilities ==
Gohan possesses superhuman strength and durability, as well as superhuman speed and reflexes, as seen during his training with his younger brother Goten. As a child, Gohan is depicted with an immense amount of hidden potential, which at first only revealed itself when he experienced fierce rage or distress. The vastness of this potential is shown consistently throughout the series as he ages and learns to master his powers from constant training and battles, the earliest example was during his short fight with Raditz. Gohan's potential was unlocked twice in the series: first by the Namekian Grand Elder, and then further unlocked by the Old Kaiō-shin, which sees his power level rise to new heights, capable of easily overwhelming the seemingly invincible Majin Buu.

As a Half-Saiyan, he can become an Oozaru, a gigantic ape-like creature, by absorbing waves from a full moon. He lost this ability after his tail was cut by Piccolo, and later Vegeta. He was the third youngest Saiyan to achieve the Super Saiyan transformation at the age of nine whilst training and surpassing his father Goku in the Room of Spirit and Time (Hyperbolic Time Chamber) and as a display of his hidden potential which he unlocked during his training with his father, Gohan becomes the first Saiyan in the series to become a Super Saiyan 2 during his battle against Cell. Though Gohan had gotten much weaker due to making the mistake of not training after the Cell Games, he became stronger than he ever had after his potential was unlocked from Old Kaiō-shin. Gohan, with this power up, was stronger than Super Saiyan 3 Gotenks since he was able to dominate Super Buu with ease without transforming.

Ever since this fight, Gohan has given up on fighting and has continually gotten weaker to the point that he can't use his Super Saiyan transformations without straining himself, while his Ultimate form was locked. Gohan can still hold his own against Frieza's soldiers, Shisami, and Tagoma in his base form and overpower them when he transforms into a Super Saiyan. After Frieza attacked Earth, Gohan returned to training with Piccolo. During his training with Piccolo before the start of the Tournament of Power, Gohan is pushed beyond his limits and manages to unlock his hidden power once again, becoming stronger than ever before. After this, he has shown that he is now able to combat foes of God-level might, having been able to hold his own in a sparring match against his father Goku in his Super Saiyan Blue form, and hold his own against Frieza in his Golden Frieza form. In the manga, Gohan manages to stalemate the fused sayian fighter, Kefla.

Once again awakening his power through immeasurable fury, upon unlocking the so-called "Beast" state (ビースト, Bīsuto), Gohan was completely unaffected by Cell Max's attacks and easily defeated him. Gohan in this new form was stated to be the strongest fighter on Earth, and is said to be even stronger than Broly. In the Manga, Gohan's Beast form is shown to allow him to fight on even terms with Goku in Ultra Instinct.

Gohan can freely manipulate a life-force energy known as ki to fly using Bukū-jutsu (舞空術; "Air Dance Technique"). He can also concentrate his ki to fire blasts of energy, such as the Kamehameha (かめはめ波; lit. 'Kamehame Wave'), inherited from his father, or the Masenko (魔閃光, Masenkō; lit. 'Demon Flash'), taught to him by Piccolo. In addition to this move, his training with Piccolo inherited Gohan his other techniques, such as the Makankōsappō (魔貫光殺砲; lit. "Demonic Piercing Light Cannon", "Special Beam Cannon" in the English dubs) in several video games, before properly using it in the main series continuity, against Cell Max. He has displayed the use of his ki in a defensive manner, such as generating protective energy shields. Both as a child and an adult, Gohan is known to be a capable swordsman, as well as an adept teacher.

== Transformations ==
Gohan's transformations are often triggered by immense potential and emotional catalysts.

Great Ape (Ōzaru): Like all Saiyans with a tail, Gohan could transform into a giant, primal ape form by absorbing enough Blutz Waves, typically from a full moon or artificial moon. This transformation increased his power but made him feral and violent. Gohan lost this ability when his tail was cut off.

Super Saiyan: Gohan first achieved this iconic, golden-haired form while training with Goku in the Hyperbolic Time Chamber during the Cell Saga. He later mastered it as the "Full Power" state, which diminished the form's strain on his body, allowing him to use it as if it was a base state.

Super Saiyan 2: Gohan was the first warrior to reach this level, which was triggered by his grief and rage after Android 16's death at the hands of Cell. This form features spikier hair and a constant electrical aura.

Ultimate Gohan (Potential Unleashed): Gained after Old Kai's unlock ability ceremony, this state draws out all of his latent power without requiring a Super Saiyan transformation. It became his standard powerful form for a long period, but his lack of training between the end of Z until the Resurrection of Frieza rendered it locked again until the Tournament of Power.

Beast Gohan: Gohan's most recent and powerful form, achieved during the events of Dragon Ball Super: Super Hero. It is an evolution of his Ultimate state, characterized by white/grey hair, red eyes, and a massive surge in power, once again triggered by traumatic anger.

== Appearances ==
=== Dragon Ball Z ===
Cover for manga chapter #404, showing four different appearances of Gohan during his childhood years.

Gohan is introduced as the four-year-old son of Goku and Chi-Chi, named after Goku's adoptive grandfather. Described as well-mannered and reserved, Gohan is abducted by the extraterrestrial Saiyan named Raditz, revealed to be his paternal uncle. While Goku is pinned to the ground, Gohan's extreme distress explodes with the release of his dormant power, which allows him to injure Raditz. With Goku training in the realm of the dead, Piccolo trains him for the upcoming battle against the two other Saiyans, Vegeta and Nappa. His tutelage under Piccolo forms a deep bond between the two characters, with Piccolo ultimately sacrificing himself to save Gohan during their fight with Nappa. After Vegeta's defeat, Gohan travels with Bulma and Krillin to planet Namek to use the Dragon Balls there to revive their fallen friends. Gohan and the others wish Piccolo back to life, causing Kami and the Dragon Balls to be returned. Gohan, along with Krillin and Vegeta, is then forced into an encounter with Frieza. After a long fight, Gohan is replaced by Goku. In the final fight, the Dragon Balls bring everybody from Namek to Earth. Frieza is found in space by his father, King Cold, and is turned into a cyborg.

Years later, Trunks kills Frieza and warns Goku about the appearance of Androids. Gohan goes into the wilderness with Goku and Piccolo to train for the upcoming threat. In the upcoming battle, they are unable to defeat Dr. Gero's creations, Gohan enters the Room of Spirit and Time with Goku, where they train for 1 year in a single day. Gohan makes the jump to Super Saiyan while he is in the chamber, and after they emerge, both Goku and Gohan retain the physical characteristics of a Super Saiyan. In the tournament organized by the android Cell, Goku tells his son to replace him in the battle. With Gohan being unable to use the rage Goku told him, Cell tortured him by harming his friends with his own children. After Android #16 is murdered by Cell, Gohan unleashes his rage and full power. Gohan easily defeats the Cell Juniors and proceeds to toy with Cell. However, Cell attempts to self-destruct when transformed back, and Goku dies with him. Cell returns, having regenerated from a single Cell that survived the blast. Right before Cell is about to finish, Vegeta, Gohan intercede, which costs him the use of his left arm. As Cell charges up one final Kamehameha wave to finish the Earth, Gohan hears the voice of his father, who gives him the resolve to attack with the father-son kamehameha. Gohan unleashes all his fury into his attack, which kills Cell.

The Gohan of the alternate timeline, referred to as "Future Gohan", to distinguish him from the character's present-timeline incarnation, is presented in the volume #33 sidestory of the original manga, Trunks the Story and its film adaptation Dragon Ball Z: The History of Trunks, in which he is shown to be the only surviving fighter; the others have all died at the hands of the androids (sans Goku due to having died from a heart virus 6 months before the androids' arrival). Gohan is shown training Trunks to assist him in battling Androids #17 and #18. In this timeline, Gohan has become a Super Saiyan and is depicted wearing a uniform similar to his father's, one with his own kanji symbol on the back, Han, 飯. Gohan states he wears it in hopes of becoming as strong as his father one day, and it is mentioned that he bears a striking resemblance to Goku when donning it. He eventually loses his left arm fighting Androids #17 and #18. He is ultimately killed by the two androids during a battle where they ganged up on Gohan, killing him with machine gun-like ki blasts. This is only depicted in the anime; his cause of death is left ambiguous in the manga, where he is already dead by the time Trunks arrives at the scene.

In the present timeline, Gohan is shown enrolled at Orange Star High School in Satan City. After foiling crimes as a Super Saiyan, he earns the alias the "Golden Warrior" (金色の戦士, Kiniro no Senshi) from the public. To hide his identity, and with help from Bulma, he adopts a superhero persona that he dubs the "Great Saiyaman" (グレートサイヤマン, Gurēto Saiyaman). When his peer, Videl, figures out his identity as the Great Saiyaman, she blackmails him into attending the 25th Tenkaichi Budōkai and teaching her to fly. Over time, the two begin to bond together and eventually form a relationship. Gohan is depicted as having grown weaker, which the Daizenshū World Guide book explains as due to a lack of training and anger in transforming. Gohan, after having his chi absorbed by Spopovich and Yamu, pursues the two and enters Bobbidi's spaceship with the Kaiō-shin, Goku, and Vegeta, where Gohan later fights with Dabura. Following Majin Buu's release and Gohan's defeat at his hands, Gohan is taken to the home planet of the Kaiō-shin. After pulling out the Zeta Sword (Known in the English Funimation Dub as the Z Sword) and accidentally breaking it in a training session, Gohan unwittingly releases the Old Kaiō-shin, who then performs a prolonged ceremony to unlock Gohan's latent powers. Gohan then returns to Earth and confronts Buu for a second time, and easily defeats him. However, his victory is temporary, as he is overpowered when Buu absorbs Gotenks and Piccolo. He is later absorbed by Buu. Though Goku and Vegeta manage to rescue him along with Goten, Trunks, and Piccolo, he is killed when Buu (now in his pure form) destroys the Earth. Once revived, Gohan aids Goku's Genki-dama by lending his chi. Following Buu's defeat and a ten-year gap, Gohan has finally become a scholar, is married with Videl and they have a daughter Pan.

=== Dragon Ball Super ===
In Battle of Gods, Gohan battles Beerus and provides his aid in transforming his father into a Super Saiyan God, with his unborn daughter Pan, also contributing as well, and in Dragon Ball Z: Resurrection 'F', Gohan confronts the resurrected Frieza and avoids being killed with the majority of the Earth's population thanks to a save by Whis.

After the latter two films' events, Gohan decides to resume his training with Piccolo, vowing to protect his family and not repeat the same mistake he made in slacking off in his training. Following a short time of civilian life, where he is unable to participate in the Universe 6 vs Universe 7 tournament thanks to a scheduling conflict, and Gohan turns down a new job, and with Pan already born, he is reunited with Trunks, being unaware of his reason to return to the past until after Goku, Trunks and Vegeta have had multiple encounters with Goku Black and he goes in search of his father. After Pan gets sick, Gohan has Shenlong to cure her and Gohan later follows Goku around after Hit targets Goku. Gohan becomes a stuntman for a movie featuring his Great Saiyaman persona against Mr. Satan, defeating Watagash and being attacked by Jaco, who thinks Gohan is Watagash's new host. Gohan then defeats a Watagash possessed Barry Kahn.

Citing a desire to protect his family, Gohan participates in Zen-Oh-sama's Universal Survival tournament for the Universe 7 team. In the exhibition round, Gohan is matched against Universe 9's Lavender, who fires a mist into his eyes that blinds him. Gohan powers up, causing the poison to accelerate through his body, and he knocks out Lavender to the ground, thus winning the fight. While Gohan and Goku recruit fighters for the Tournament of Power, Gohan is outsmarted by Krillin in a sparring match after being blinded with the Solar Flare x 100, leading him to get eliminated from that sparring match. Gohan's training with Piccolo, during which Piccolo chastises Gohan for being reckless as a result of wanting to protect his family, concludes with Gohan becoming stronger than ever before and the two agreeing to develop combination moves. Gohan then challenges Goku to a duel, Gohan shows power that rivals Goku, but still loses the match. Goku is impressed with his son's power and decides to make him the captain of their team in the Tournament of Power. In the Tournament of Power, Gohan defeats Universe 6's Botamo, Universe 10's Obuni, Universe 6's Saonel and Pirina, and Universe 3's Anilaza before Universes 7 and 11 become the only remaining teams in the tournament. Gohan initially partners with Android 17 to battle Toppo, firing a Kamehameha wave at Android 17 and Toppo while they are inside Android 17's barrier in effort to ring them out, though Gohan retracts the beam out of concern for Android 17. Gohan breaks away from the fight with Toppo and comes to Frieza's aid against Dyspo, Gohan defeats Dyspo and holds him down while both of them are blasted out of bounds by Frieza.

Months later, Gohan, along with the Z fighters, await the arrival of Moro, who is approaching Earth. Gohan fights off Moro and his henchmen long enough for Goku and Vegeta to arrive back on Earth. Gohan then lends Goku some of his energy to help kill Moro.

Gohan appears as the supporting protagonist of Dragon Ball Super: Super Hero, alongside his mentor, Piccolo, rather than his father and Vegeta, both having trained off-world. In the film, when the resusciated Red Ribbon Army plots to once again get back at Goku and his family for its destruction, a disguised Piccolo takes advantage of it and uses this event as a way to motivate Gohan, who has gone somewhat docile from peacetime and his studying, to getting back into top form as his father was offworld training. Having witnessed his young daughter Pan's kidnapping, an enraged Gohan is led to the Army's hidden base to confront its leaders, finding himself contending with the new androids, Gamma 1 and 2, alongside Piccolo. After Cell Max (a recreation of the original Cell) is awakened prematurely courtesy of a dying Magenta, Gohan, alongside his friends, deals with the monster. Witnessing Cell Max seemingly killing Piccolo, Gohan, very similarly to his awakening against the original Cell as a child, snaps and unleashes a never-before-seen transformation in an explosive rage, referred to as the "Beast" state. Swiftly retaliating and without hesitation, Gohan unleashes his final attack against Cell Max, assisted by Piccolo, killing the abomination and saving the world. After sensing Gohan's ki, Goku visits Earth and convinces Gohan, along with Goten and Trunks, to come fight on Beerus' planet. Gohan spars with Goku, revealing to him his newly acquired Beast form and how he can tap into his anger, but subdue it before losing control. This, in turn, prompts Goku to set up a training match between Gohan and Broly, in hopes that he can help Broly control his anger, successfully doing so in their fight. Vegeta grows impatient and jumps in to fight, along with Goku, Trunks, and Goten, in a massive Saiyan brawl. After they're all worn out, they have supper and leave to go back to Earth, where Goku accompanies Gohan and Piccolo to pick Pan up from school.

== In other media ==
Gohan appears in twelve of the thirteen Dragon Ball Z side story films; in the first movie, Gohan is kidnapped by Garlic Jr. due to his hat having a Dragon Ball on it and causes the villain's plan to fail when he uses his dormant power against him; in the second, Gohan participates in the fight against Dr. Wheelo and frees Piccolo from further mind control; in the third, Gohan is forcibly made to combat his father as an Oozaru before having his tail removed; in the fourth, Gohan attempts to fight Lord Slug's men only to be defeated; in the fifth, Gohan watches over his father's body after Goku shields him from a blast from Cooler. He also goes to Kirin Tower for Senzu beans to give to his father; in the sixth, Gohan travels to New Namek and fights Cooler's army of robots; in the seventh, Gohan intervenes in the battle against Android 13 by attacking him and then defending his father against the android when he tries to power the Genki-Dama; in the eighth, Gohan tries fighting Broly but does worse than everyone else and is defeated and later aids in the Saiyan's defeat by providing his energy; in the ninth, Gohan faces Bojack and his henchmen, struggling initially before transforming into a Super Saiyan 2 and successfully stopping Bojack and his group of invaders; in the tenth, Gohan comes to the aid of Goten and Trunks after they are confronted by Broly, who he seemingly kills alongside his father and brother in a family Kamehameha wave; in the twelfth, Gohan combats the villains that have escaped from Other World and defeats Frieza with one punch; in the thirteenth, Gohan battles Hirudegarn following his appearance.

In filler episodes of Dragon Ball Z, while training for the Saiyans, Gohan makes friends with C-6 and a dinosaur. During the Namek arc, Gohan also encounters the Mirror spaceship and a fake version of Namek, where he, Krillin and Bulma collect Dragon Balls during a distraction, and prevent their ship from being stolen. In the Garlic Jr. arc, entirely composed of filler, Gohan is one of only a few unaffected by the Black Water Mist and after fighting his allies, he travels to the lookout where he kills the henchmen of Garlic Jr. after they severely injure Krillin, Gohan then sending Garlic Jr. back into the Dead Zone by destroying his power through shooting out the Makyo Star after being attacked by Piccolo and Krillin as they pretend to be under the effects of the Black Water Mist. Leading up to the Cell Games, Gohan encounters Taopaipai, his father's old enemy, who flees from a potential battle once recognizing Gohan as Goku's son and celebrates his 11th birthday, it being shown in flashbacks how he acquires his name and how he had hidden potential within infancy. Before the Buu arc beginning, Gohan's high school antics are explored such as his masquerading as Great Saiyaman and his first date. After Buu is defeated, Gohan attends a party with his family.

He is featured in other Dragon Ball Z animations; in Dragon Ball Z Side Story: Plan to Eradicate the Saiyans, Gohan uses a Super Masenko to destroy Hatchiyack, who is killed by his combined efforts alongside Goku, Vegeta and Trunks and in Yo! Son Goku and His Friends Return!!, Gohan meets Vegeta's younger brother Tarble after Tarble arrives on Earth, also advising Goten and Trunks in their fight against Abo and Kado.

Gohan appears in the anime-only sequel, Dragon Ball GT in a reduced role. He is the second Saiyan on Earth to be taken control of by Baby, who previously controlled his younger brother Goten and moved to possessing Gohan during their battle. After Vegeta becomes Baby's permanent host, the parasite transmitting himself to Vegeta during a fight between him and the possessed Gohan, Gohan remains under his influence due to Baby having implanted Tuffle parasite inside of him while he was originally possessed. After regaining his will, he assists his father in defeating Baby, donating his energy and tearfully bids farewell to his former mentor Piccolo as the latter dies alongside the Earth. He then participates in the fights against Super 17 and Omega Shenron.

Gohan has performed multiple songs, his voice actor, Masako Nozawa, singing about his character, the first of these being the song "The World's Greatest Gohan" released on the 1989 album Dragon Ball Z Hit Song Collection, Gohan singing about how good he feels. The second was "I Lo~ve Mr. Piccolo" in the album Dragon Ball Z Hit Song Collection III: Space Dancing, released in 1990, Gohan singing Piccolo praises and speculating on what species he is. Another song, "Feeling of Whistling", debuted on the 1991 album Dragon Ball Z Hit Song Collection 6: BP∞ Battle Points Unlimited. The 1991 album Dragon Ball Z Hit Song Collection 8: Character Special 2 features the song ""I•ke•na•i Oo-La-La Magic", where Chi-Chi forces Gohan to sing a duet with her after she feels left out from his adventures with Goku, also intending to enter the local karaoke circuit with Gohan.

Gohan has made appearances in non-Dragon Ball material. In the 2003 interactive feature Kyutai Panic Adventure! (球体パニックアドベンチャー!, Kyūtai Panikku Adobenchā!; Orb Panic Adventure!), Gohan and Krillin attempt to save visitors of at Fuji Television's orb section from drowning, while Goku battles Frieza. In the 2013 special Dream 9 Toriko & One Piece & Dragon Ball Z Super Collaboration Special (ドリーム9 トリコ&ワンピース&ドラゴンボールZ 超コラボスペシャル!), Gohan cheers on Goku in his match against Monkey D. Luffy and Toriko.

Since Dragon Ball Z began syndication in the U.S. in 1996, Gohan has also appeared in American media. Gohan has been used in promotional merchandising at fast-food chain Burger King, and collectible cards, such as the Dragon Ball Z Collectible Card Game, have featured Gohan frequently. Gohan is referenced in the song "Goku" by Soulja Boy Tell 'Em, where he brags that he looks and feels like Gohan and a few other Dragon Ball related characters. Gohan, along with Goku, is parodied in the Robot Chicken episode "Easter Basket". In "The Move", an episode of The Amazing World of Gumball, Gumball gains hair identical to Super Saiyan 2 Gohan when transforming into a Super Saiyan. Gohan appears for a scene in a parody of the film Moneyball in an episode of Mad being drafted by Billy Beane.

=== Video games ===
In the 1992 Video game Dragon Ball: Get Together! Goku World, Gohan, along with Goku, Trunks, Bulma, and Krillin, travel back in time to examine events in the past.

In the 2004 video game Dragon Ball Z: Supersonic Warriors, Gohan comes to Goku's aid against the androids and defeats Android 18. After Goku passes away from a heart disease, Gohan inherits his role as Earth's primary protector. Gohan confronts Dr. Gero, whom he defeats and is warned by of an upcoming threat from Cell, the latter announcing the Cell Games after being revealed, and Gohan training with Piccolo in the Room of Spirit and Time to prepare. After Gohan and Piccolo struggle against Cell, and Piccolo sacrifices himself to save Gohan, Gohan unleashes his hidden power and destroys Cell. In the 2005 video game Dragon Ball Z: Supersonic Warriors 2, after his defeat of Cell, Gohan is recruited by Trunks to assist him with defeating the androids in his timeline. After defeating Android 18, Gohan and Trunks confront and defeat Cell. The two travel to Dr. Gero's laboratory and defeat various clones of the android and destroy the computer that created them. Years later, he encounters Cooler when the latter comes to Earth searing for the Saiyan that defeated his brother Frieza. Piccolo is turned evil when taking a blast from Bobbidi to protect Gohan, who is forced to fight Piccolo before the latter flees. Gohan later confronts Piccolo and defeats him.

In the 2006 game Dragon Ball Z: Shin Budokai, Gohan confronts Frieza after the latter is resurrected and unsuccessfully tries donning his Great Saiyaman persona, becoming worn out in the process of fighting him before Frieza departs. Gohan then confronts Cooler after seeing him search for a Dragon Ball and bests him in battle, before Cooler escapes with the Dragon Ball using the Shunkan Idō. Later, Janemba's influence allows Gohan to kill Cell with ease and nearly become consumed with evil energy before Goku's intervention. In the 2007 game Dragon Ball Z: Shin Budokai – Another Road, Gohan travels to Trunks' timeline to assist him with the Majin Buu threat. and fights Janemba while searching for the timeline's version of himself to pull the Zeta Sword. Gohan meets Pikkon and his grandfather Bardock for the first time.

In the 2010 arcade game Dragon Ball Heroes, Gohan attains both the Super Saiyan 3, the result of continued training with Piccolo after the Cell Games, and Super Saiyan 4 forms.

In the 2015 game Dragon Ball: Xenoverse, Gohan serves as a mentor with Videl, teaching the player moves. In the Saiyan arc, the player saves Gohan from being killed by Raditz; in the Frieza arc, Gohan being left to fight Frieza alone causes Goku to rush to his aid instead of finishing healing; in the Cell arc, Gohan receives a Villainous Mode power-up from Towa and the player helps him defeat Villainous Mode Cell; and in the epilogue of the game, the player faces Gohan in Villainous Mode. In the 2016 game Dragon Ball Xenoverse 2, the player is commanded to prevent any intervention in the fight between Goku and Cell, and after Gohan transforms into a Super Saiyan 2, Trunks notes that the timeline has been altered by the continued presence of the Cell Juniors. After the player defends Gohan from the Cell Juniors, a portal transfers multiple Metal Coolers into the arena, which the player defeats before departing for Namek while Gohan continues fighting Cell. The player returns to help Gohan battle Cell, whose power remains enhanced by Towa's magic. In the alternate timeline, Gohan is confronted by Android 16, who seeks to kill him for being Goku's son. Gohan realizes his strength and urges the player to leave while he holds him off before the two defeat Android 16 and are approached by Mira, who takes interest in Gohan's potential. Gohan and the player are outclassed by Mira, leading Trunks to conclude that the two will die and travel to the scene of the fight. After Trunks declares that he will not let Mira kill Gohan and Mira flees, Gohan realizes that Trunks is from the future and tells him he is proud of him, though he mentions that 17 and 18 are attacking. Trunks is tempted to prevent him from going to the fight, knowing that he will die and that it will change history, but is stopped by the player.

In the 2018 game Dragon Ball FighterZ, an unconscious Gohan is found by Goku, Piccolo, and Krillin, and after waking up, joins their quest to combat the clones. He later participates in destroying Android 21 by firing a Masenko at her. In the game's second arc, Gohan is found by Goku, Frieza, and Cell, and is skeptical of the latter two when being told of their alliance with the heroes.

Gohan has also appeared in crossover games such as Battle Stadium D.O.N, Jump Super Stars, and Jump Ultimate Stars as a playable character.

== Reception ==
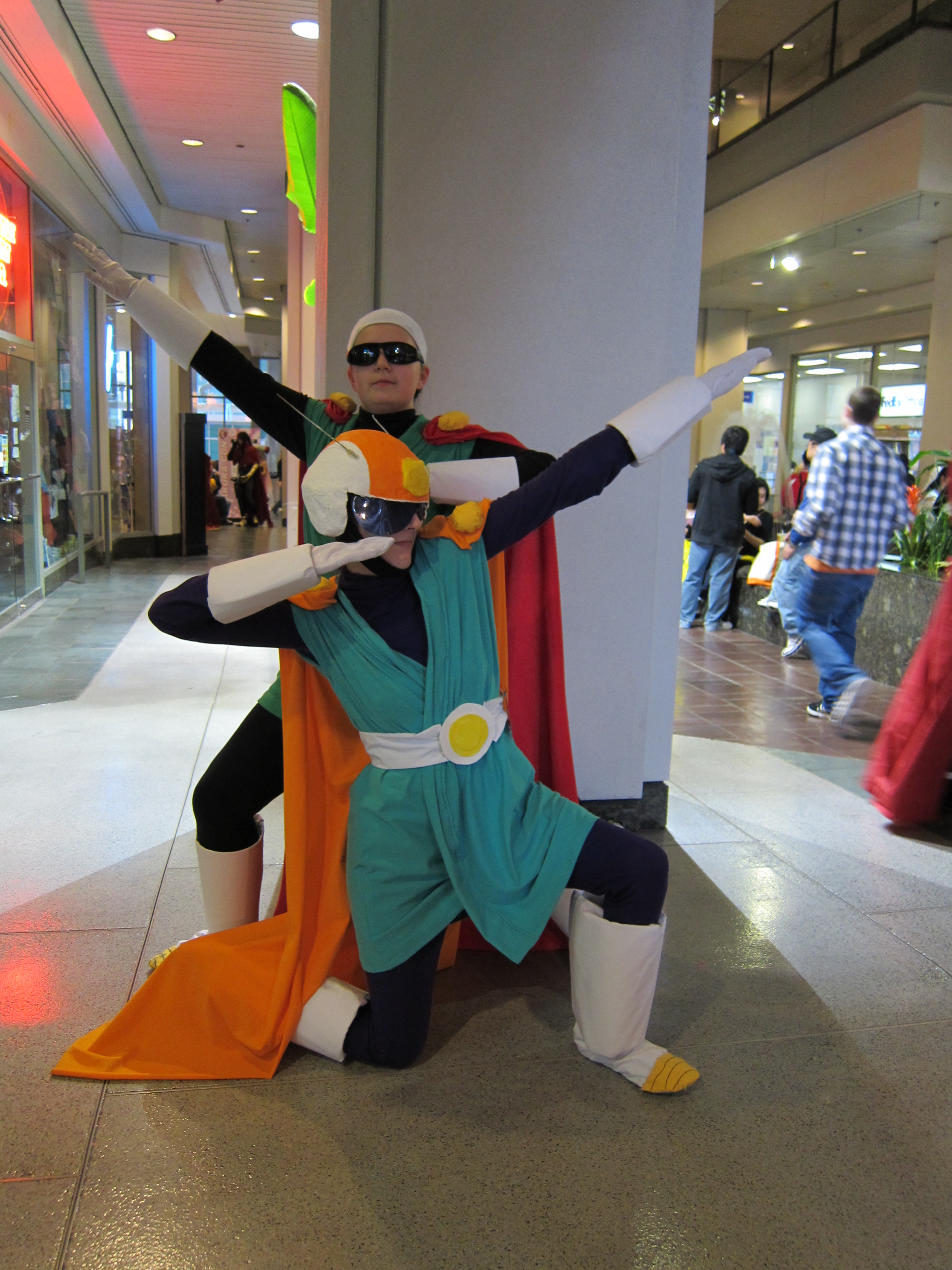
Cosplayers portraying Gohan (back) and Videl (front) in their respective Great Saiyaman costumes.

In 1993, Gohan placed first in a Dragon Ball character popularity poll voted on by Weekly Shōnen Jump readers, and was also voted the third most popular character by fans of the series for the 2004 book Dragon Ball Forever. Due to the popularity of Gohan, other merchandise, such as action figures, video games, and clothing have featured Gohan in Japan and various countries around the world. C.J. A. Glover of Moviepilot ranked Gohan his third favorite comic character, admitting Gohan "has always been somewhat of an idol to me" as he related to bottling up his anger and being a gentle person that, when snapping, "would let loose and it would be hard to bottle it back up again." In conclusion, Glover wrote that Gohan was definitely "one of my favorite anime and manga characters ever." Gohan's relationship with mentor Piccolo during the Saiyan arc was praised, being seen as "complex" and "culminating in a truly emotional and inspiring moment that one doesn't often expect from your average animated series." Tomoko Hiroki from Bandai Namco considered Gohan her favorite character from the series.

Most of Gohan's praise is derived from his role in the Cell arc of Dragon Ball Z. IGN writer D. F. Smith liked how during the Cell Games, Gohan has more screen time than Goku, and praised his scenes as one of the biggest moments from said story arc. Theron Martin from Anime News Network celebrated Gohan's development in the Cell Games as he had grown up and become stronger. The character's battles against Cell during the arc and his transformation into a Super Saiyan 2 were positively received as some of the best in the entire series, the fight additionally being praised for its animation. Both Anime Focus and John Begley believed Dragon Ball Z could have ended with Gohan's defeat of Cell, the latter reasoning concluding it there would have "provided it a sense of poignancy and closure that retroactively would have provided a greater sense of depth and purpose." Luke Ryan Baldock of The Hollywood News felt Gohan's progression was the focus of the Cell Games and that he had begun to match his father Goku in ability, calling their relationship "a fascinating one to watch unfold." Reviewer Nick Hartel expressed that the "continuing elevation of Gohan" pleased him and the last episodes of the Cell storyline "properly sees this is paid off from a narrative standpoint." Reviewer Todd Douglass Jr. wrote that the series split its focus between Goku and Gohan during the start of the series as they grew on their own, finding it to be "an interesting way to handle the flow of story but also important because it shows Gohan's growth as a person and warrior."

Gohan's role and character in the latter part of the series were met with more mixed reviews. Reviewer Michael Zupan wrote of his disappointment with the character, "Gohan was once the most promising warrior in the galaxy, with the potential to even best his father, Goku... and this is where he's at seven years later? Dressing up in a green dress, black tights, and a Lost in Space helmet to put the beat down on robbers?" Anime Focus found humor in his Great Saiyaman guise and his "clumsy but earnest" relationship with Videl, but thought it "mostly uninspired and draggy and feels very flat after the high flying antics of previous arcs." Reviewer Brad Stephenson argued that the character growing older and becoming more "emotionally complex" provided Dragon Ball Z "with a true sense of progression and meaning." While controversial, lighthearted and more casual fans of the show tend to enjoy the Saiyaman saga due to its comedic tone and way of portraying larger than life figures in relatable real life situations. Josh Begley enjoyed Gohan trying to find his place in high school and his role as big brother to Goten, but thought his Great Saiyaman guise was not comedic and became embarrassed on the character's behalf. Anime Focus was impressed with his fight against Majin Buu after he was powered up, calling it a "rare chance for him to flex his muscles" by giving Majin Buu "an impressive beatdown".

Gohan's portrayal in Dragon Ball Super was the subject of negative response. Den of Geek noted his lighthearted self was not fit for Trunks' dark storyline and heavily contrasted the previous characterizations of Gohan Trunks used to see. In a later review, the same site enjoyed how the anime mocked Gohan's heroic persona but had mixed feelings in regards to its handling in gag episode. The site addressed fans' complaints about how Gohan's character was nearly forgotten by the staff members as well as his marriage with Videll. Sam Leach from Anime News Network noted that fans of the series tend to joke Piccolo is a better paternal figure to Gohan than his actual father, Goku, and felt that Dragon Ball Super emphasized it more when Piccolo started training him again. On the other hand, Leach criticized how Super tries to teach "life lessons" to a mature Gohan. The fact that Piccolo calls him "arrogant", despite Gohan's kindness and humility, was seen as a bad plot point by the reviewer. Mark Sammut of TheGamer notes that Gohan occasionally performs the dab move (as The Great Saiyaman), decades before it became a popular dance move in American popular culture.

Collider claimed that Gohan was the character with the most character development given in the entire series as the plot of Dragon Ball Z primarily focused on his coming-of-age history as he faces enemies despite his young age to the point that Toei almost turned the title of the anime into Dragon Ball: Gohan's Big Adventure. However, Gohan was still overshadowed by Goku, who was still the main hero in the story arcs, even though Gohan was the developed hero. Following Goku's death in the Cell Games, Collider notes that the writers appeared to give Gohan his role as the protagonist definitively, especially with how he kills Cell and becomes the focus of the anime's time-skip opening sequence rather than Goku. However, Gohan being once again replaced by his father as the series' hero due to Toriyama not finding him equal to Goku for the Buu arc disappointed the writer and thus hopes that the upcoming moving Super Hero will give him the catharsis he wants as it meant to properly focus on Gohan once again. Polygon claimed that Piccolo was the best paternal figure to Gohan and it is further demonstrated in Super Hero due to the two sharing emotional scenes to the point the former goes on a quest to train the latter such as taking care of his daughter which Gohan honors in response.

== Merchandise ==
Gohan has been featured on various merchandises, including action figures, plushies, and keychains. Adidas, in 2018, released a Dragon Ball collaboration that featured a sneaker design with Gohan. Swatch also collaborated with the franchise, to release a character branded wristwatch.
