= List of Dragon Ball video games =

Dragon Ball
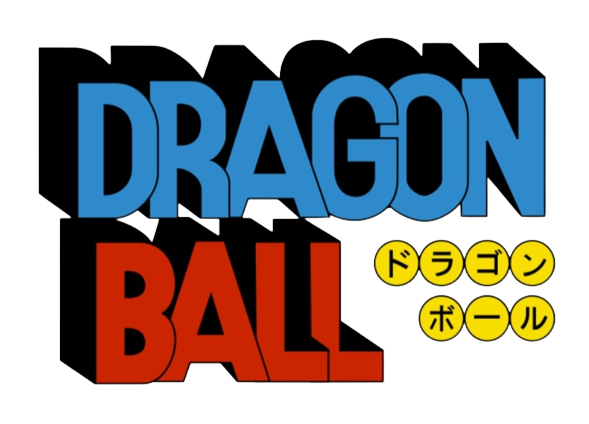
- Genres: Fighting, role-playing
- Developer: Various
- Publishers: Bandai, Banpresto, Infogrames, Atari SA, Bandai Namco Entertainment
- Platforms: Super Cassette Vision, Famicom/NES, Super Famicom/Super NES, Mega Drive, Playdia, PC Engine, Saturn, PlayStation, PlayStation 2, PlayStation 3, PlayStation 4, PlayStation 5, Xbox, Xbox 360, Xbox One, Xbox Series X/S, GameCube, Wii, Nintendo Switch, Nintendo Switch 2, WonderSwan Color, PlayStation Portable, PlayStation Vita, Game Boy, Game Boy Color, Game Boy Advance, Nintendo DS, Nintendo 3DS, Mobile, Android, iOS, iPadOS
- First release: Dragon Ball: Dragon Daihikyō; September 27, 1986
- Latest release: Dragon Ball: Gekishin Squadra; September 9, 2025
- Parent series: Dragon Ball

The Dragon Ball video games are based on the manga series of the same name created by Akira Toriyama. The games are of various genres, most prominently fighting games, role-playing games, and platform games, all featuring a varying roster of characters as depicted in the original series. Toriyama himself personally designed some of the video game original characters, such as Android 21 for Dragon Ball FighterZ, Mira and Towa for Dragon Ball Online, and Bonyū for Dragon Ball Z: Kakarot.

Dragon Ball games have been primarily released in Japan since 1986, with the majority of them being produced by Bandai. Games from the 16-bit and 32-bit eras were localized and released in France, Spain, Portugal, and other European countries due to the strong following the series already had in those countries. Up until 1994, with the exception of Dragon Ball: Shenlong no Nazo (which was released as Dragon Power, and was graphically altered), no games were localized for the North American market.

In November 2000, Infogrames, Inc., the North American division of French publisher Infogrames, signed a deal to secure the license to publish Dragon Ball games for the North American market. With the release of their first two titles in the franchise, 2002's Dragon Ball Z: The Legacy of Goku and Dragon Ball Z: Budokai, Infogrames more than doubled their sales. After their rebranding to Atari, the company paid $10 million to secure exclusive North American rights until January 2010. Dragon Ball was Atari's top-earning licensed property, earning $85 million in 2005 and accounting for over 49% of their annual revenue in 2008. In November 2007, Funimation, the North American licensor of Dragon Ball's anime adaptations, claimed that Atari had breached its publishing contract with them and attempted to terminate their contract, but this was settled a month later. In 2008, Atari announced that over 12.7 million video game units based on the series had been sold since May 2002. In July 2009, Namco Bandai Games announced that they had acquired the North American publishing rights to Dragon Ball and that they would begin publishing titles following the expiration of Atari's contract in January 2010. The first Dragon Ball titles to be published by them in North America were Dragon Ball Z: Attack of the Saiyans, Dragon Ball: Raging Blast, and Dragon Ball: Revenge of King Piccolo.

By December 2014, over 40 million video games based on the franchise had been sold worldwide. The Dragon Ball Xenoverse series sold a further 14 million units between 2015 and 2021, Dragon Ball FighterZ sold over 10 million, Dragon Ball Z: Kakarot over 8 million units, while Dragon Ball: Sparking! Zero over 5 million copies, bringing software sales to over 77 million units sold. In addition, the mobile game Dragon Ball Z: Dokkan Battle has exceeded 300 million downloads and grossed over $3 billion.

== Home console and handheld games ==
=== 1980s ===
Home console and handheld games
Game	Details
Dragon Ball: Dragon Daihikyō: JP: September 27, 1986; – Super Cassette Vision	Notes: Dragon Ball: Dragon Daihikyō (ドラゴンボール ドラゴン大秘境, Doragon Bōru: Dragon Daihikyō; Dragon Ball: Dragon's Great Exploration) The first Dragon Ball console video game ever produced. It was released by Epoch, making it the only game not to feature any kind of involvement with Bandai or the subsequent Namco Bandai. The game is an overhead shoot'em up that allows players to take on the role of Goku who rides on the Nimbus while firing Ki blasts and swatting at enemies with his Power Pole.
Dragon Ball: Shenlong no Nazo Dragon Power Dragon Ball: Le Secret du Dragon: JP: November 27, 1986; NA: March 1988; FRA: 1990; ESP: 1993; – Family Computer, Nintendo Entertainment System	Notes: Known in Japan as Dragon Ball: Shenlong no Nazo (ドラゴンボール 神龍の謎, Doragon Bōru: Shenron no Nazo; Shenlong's Riddle), in Europe as Dragon Ball: Le Secret du Dragon, the game was developed by Tose and released by Bandai in 1986. The game stars Goku and very roughly follows the first two volumes of the Dragon Ball manga, culminating in the first wish from Shenlong. The game consists of 2D overhead areas where Goku must fight many enemies and side scrolling sequences for the boss fights. It was added as bonus feature in the Japanese release of Dragon Ball: Origins 2 in 2010.; In the USA the game is known as Dragon Power. Although the Japanese, French and Spanish editions of the game used the familiar art and music from the Dragon Ball anime, the US version is stated to be based on Journey to the West with no mention of Dragon Ball. Goku was changed to more closely resemble an Americanized Kung Fu stereotype, being pictured on the box with a white gi and blue headband. Master Roshi has been similarly changed to look more like a traditional martial arts master. Bulma is called "Nora", Yamcha is called "Lancer", Oolong is called "Pudgy", Pilaf is called "King Minos", the Kamehameha is the "Wind Wave", and the Dragon Balls are referred to as "Crystalballs". Also, the game has been shortened; all levels that correspond with the Kung-Fu Tournament halfway through the game have been removed. Furthermore, all sexual references have been censored out; for instance, the "girl's panties" power-up (which temporarily makes Goku run fast) now resembles a triangle-cut sandwich.; The European version, released in France in 1990 (and in Spain in late 1993), retains the Dragon Ball license and characters for the game albeit with the same censorship found in the American adaptation regarding the sexual content. The French translation includes a lot of misspellings. In Spain, the game was also released in French language, although the Spanish edition specifically featured an instruction manual in Spanish language.
Dragon Ball: Daimaō Fukkatsu: JP: August 12, 1988; – Family Computer	Notes: Dragon Ball: Daimaō Fukkatsu (ドラゴンボール大魔王復活, Doragon Bōru Daimaō Fukkatsu; lit. Dragon Ball: Great Demon King's Revival) was released in Japan for the Family Computer on August 12, 1988 by Bandai.; It takes place during the King Piccolo arc. It was one of the first games to have a board game, which included battles using cards. The battle card games are a hybrid of role playing games, board games and trading cards. The players move around a game board and encounter characters on the way. Some characters offer information and others need to be battled. The outcome of each fight is determined by the randomly generated hand of cards players and the opponent are dealt. The player flips over cards in a certain order, and their actions are shown in an animated battle that lasts until one of the characters is defeated.; The game topped the Japanese sales charts in August 1988, and again in September and October 1988.; A fan-made English translation was released in 2011.
Dragon Ball 3: Gokūden: JP: October 27, 1989; – Family Computer	Notes: Dragon Ball 3: Gokūden (ドラゴンボール3 悟空伝, Doragon Bōru 3 Gokūden; lit. Dragon Ball 3: Goku's Story) was released by Bandai on October 27, 1989 for the Famicom in Japan. A remake was released for the WonderSwan Color in 2003.; The game relates all of the Dragon Ball story until the fight against Piccolo Junior. The main character is Goku as a child and adult, though Krillin and Yamcha are also playable.; It topped the bi-weekly Japanese Famitsu sales charts in November 1989 and again in December 1989.

=== 1990s ===
Home console and handheld games
Game	Details
Dragon Ball Z: Kyōshū! Saiyajin: JP: October 27, 1990; – Family Computer	Notes: Dragon Ball Z: Kyōshū! Saiyajin (ドラゴンボールZ 強襲!サイヤ人, Doragon Bōru Z Kyōshū! Saiyajin; Dragon Ball Z: Assault! Saiyans) was the first Dragon Ball Z game to be released for the Family Computer. It was released by Bandai on October 27, 1990 in Japan.; The game features Raditz, Nappa, Vegeta, two illusion Saiyans who fight Yamcha, Tien, Piccolo, Gohan and Krillin in the anime, and an original who transforms into a Great Ape.; The game topped the Japanese Famitsu sales chart in February 1992.; A fan-made English translation was released in 2005.
Dragon Ball Z II: Gekishin Freeza: JP: August 10, 1991; – Family Computer	Notes: Dragon Ball Z II: Gekishin Freeza!! (ドラゴンボールZII 激神フリーザ!!, Doragon Bōru Z II Gekishin Furīza!!; Dragon Ball Z II: Freeza the Fierce God!!) was released by Bandai on August 10, 1991 in Japan for the Famicom.; The game features the story on Namek and follows closely to the story in the anime except for the fact that, like in the previous game, Tenshinhan, Yamucha and Chaozu are not dead but are present in the player's party at the beginning.; A fan-made English translation was released in 2019.
Dragon Ball Z: Super Saiya Densetsu: JP: January 25, 1992; – Super Famicom	Notes: Dragon Ball Z: Chō Saiya Densetsu (ドラゴンボールZ 超サイヤ伝説, Doragon Bōru Z Chō Saiya Densetsu; Dragon Ball Z: Legend of the Super Saiyan), also known as Dragon Ball Z: Super Saiya Densetsu (ドラゴンボールZ スーパーサイヤでんせつ, Doragon Bōru Z Sūpā Saiya Densetsu), is the first Dragon Ball game for the Super Famicom.; It is a remake combining two earlier Famicom games: Dragon Ball Z: Kyôshū! Saiyan and Dragon Ball Z II: Gekishin Frieza.; A fan-made English translation was released in 2016.
Dragon Ball Z III: Ressen Jinzōningen: JP: August 7, 1992; – Family Computer	Notes: Dragon Ball Z III: Ressen Jinzōningen (ドラゴンボールZIII 烈戦人造人間, Doragon Bōru Z III Ressen Jinzōningen; Dragon Ball Z III: Fierce Battle with the Androids) released on August 7, 1992 in Japan by Bandai for the Famicom.; It is a retelling of the Android arc up until Cell transforms into his first form.; The game topped the Japanese Famitsu sales chart in August 1992.; A fan-made English translation was released in 2007.
Dragon Ball Z: Gekitō Tenkaichi Budokai: JP: December 29, 1992; – Family Computer	Notes: Dragon Ball Z: Gekitō Tenkaichi Budokai (ドラゴンボールZ 激闘天下一武道会, Doragon Bōru Z Gekitō Tenkaichi Budōkai; Dragon Ball Z: A Fierce Battle at the Number One Under Heaven Martial Arts Gathering) was released only in Japan by Bandai on December 29, 1992 for the Famicom. The game was unique in that it came with a special card reader attachment, the Datach Joint Rom System, which required several character cards to be swiped in order to select a character.
Dragon Ball Z: Super Butōden Original release date(s): JP: March 20, 1993; EU: November 30, 1993; NA: September 28, 2018	Release years by system: 1993 - Super Famicom; 2018 - Nintendo Switch
Dragon Ball Z: Super Butōden Original release date(s): JP: March 20, 1993; EU: November 30, 1993; NA: September 28, 2018	Notes: Dragon Ball Z: Super Butōden (ドラゴンボールZ 超武闘伝(スーパーぶとうでん), Doragon Bōru Z Sūpā Butōden; Dragon Ball Z: Super Fighting Legend) is the first installment in the Super Butōden series. The game was released in Japan on March 20, 1993 and in France and Spain on November 30, 1993. In Europe was often referred simply as Dragon Ball Z.; Super Butōden features 13 playable characters (Goku, S.Goku, Gohan, Piccolo, Vegeta, S.Vegeta, Frieza, Cell, P.Cell, Trunks and the Androids #16, #18 and #20/Dr. Gero) and its story mode spans from the Piccolo Jr. arc to the conclusion of the Cell Games.
Dragon Ball Z Gaiden: Saiyajin Zetsumetsu Keikaku: JP: August 6, 1993; – Family Computer	Notes: Dragon Ball Z Gaiden: Saiyajin Zetsumetsu Keikaku (ドラゴンボールZ外伝 サイヤ人絶滅計画, Doragon Bōru Z Gaiden Saiyajin Zetsumetsu Keikaku; Dragon Ball Z Side Story: Plan to Eradicate the Saiyans) was released for the Famicom on August 6, 1993.; Gameplay takes the form of a card battle RPG, where the player's movement and battle choices are dictated by the randomly generated playing cards the player receives. Multiplayer is a six player tournament using difficulty level of computer players that are in the save file. Players can choose between Goku, Gohan, Piccolo, Trunks and Vegeta. Winner records are kept in the game data, as well as any moves the player might learn.; The game follows Dr. Lychee, a survivor of the Tuffle race annihilated by the Saiyans. Lychee manages to escape from the planet with a ship containing Hatchhyackku, a super computer able to create "Ghost images" of other warriors, though he is killed soon after. Hatchhyackku creates a ghost image of him to get revenge on the surviving Saiyans. He places machines that emit a gas capable of destroying life on Earth, so Goku, Gohan, Vegeta, Future Trunks, and Piccolo rush to destroy the devices located around the planet. They manage to destroy all but one that is protected by an impenetrable energy barrier and guarded by ghost warriors of Frieza, Cooler, Turles, and Lord Slug, which have to be killed in the same way as the originals. They eventually track down Lychee, defeat him, and learn of Hatchhyackku, who absorbs Lychee's hatred and materializes in an android body. Hatchhyackku devastates the heroes until the Saiyans, after having transformed into their Super Saiyan states, combine their powers together into one massive wave of energy, ending the threat of the ghost warriors.; A fan-made English translation was released in 2007.
Dragon Ball Z: Super Butōden 2 Dragon Ball Z: La Légende Saien Original release date(s): JP: December 17, 1993; EU: June 1994; NA: October 20, 2015	Release years by system: 1993 - Super Famicom; 2015 - Nintendo 3DS
Dragon Ball Z: Super Butōden 2 Dragon Ball Z: La Légende Saien Original release date(s): JP: December 17, 1993; EU: June 1994; NA: October 20, 2015	Notes: Dragon Ball Z: Super Butōden 2 (ドラゴンボールZ 超武闘伝(スーパーぶとうでん)2, Doragon Bōru Z Sūpā Butōden 2; Dragon Ball Z: Super Fighting Legend 2), called Dragon Ball Z: la Légende Saien in France and in Spain (although it was translated as Dragon Ball Z: La Leyenda de Saien for the Spanish instruction manual), is the second installment in the Super Butōden series. The game was released in Japan on December 17, 1993 and in France and Spain in June 1994. This game was released in North America on the 3DS virtual console.; Super Butōden 2 features 10 playable characters (In the Japanese version are 8 normal, 2 unlockable with a code) and its story mode covers the Cell Games as well as several stories involving Bojack, Zangya, and Broly completely unrelated to the movies they hail from. For unknown reasons, these three characters were renamed Kujila, Aki, and Tara in the French version, respectively. Depending on if the player wins or loses a battle, the story will take a different turn in the Story Mode, which leads to a lot of possibilities to experience.; This is the only Dragon Ball Z fighting game in which Goku is not readily playable. A code is required in the Japanese version to unlock him and Broly, the other hidden character. This is not necessary in the European versions, as both characters are already unlocked.
Dragon Ball Z: Buyū Retsuden Dragon Ball Z: L'Appel du Destin: JP: April 1, 1994; EU: June 1994; – Mega Drive	Notes: Dragon Ball Z: Buyū Retsuden (ドラゴンボールZ 武勇列伝, Doragon Bōru Z Buyū Retsuden; Dragon Ball Z: Legend of Valiants), released as Dragon Ball Z: L'Appel du Destin (Dragon Ball Z: The Call of Destiny) in France and Spain and as Dragon Ball Z in Portugal, is a fighting game released for the Mega Drive. It was released in Japan on April 1, 1994 and Europe in June 1994. The playable characters are Goku, Gohan, Krillin, Piccolo, Vegeta, Captain Ginyu, Recoome, Frieza, Future Trunks, Android 18, and Cell.
Dragon Ball Z: Shin Saiyajin Zenmetsu Keikaku — Chikyū-Hen: JP: September 23, 1994; – Playdia	Notes: Dragon Ball Z Gaiden: Saiyan Zetsumetsu Keikaku Chikyū-Hen (ドラゴンボールZ外伝 真サイヤ人絶滅計画 地球編, Doragon Bōru Z Gaiden Shin Saiyajin Zetsumetsu Keikaku Chikyū-Hen; Dragon Ball Z Side Story: True Plan to Eradicate the Saiyans: Earth Edition) is part one in the Saiyan Zenmetsu Keikaku series for the Playdia. The game was released on September 23, 1994.
Dragon Ball Z: Super Butōden 3 Dragon Ball Z: Ultime Menace: JP: September 29, 1994; EU: January 25, 1995; – Super Famicom	Notes: Dragon Ball Z: Super Butōden 3 (ドラゴンボールZ 超武闘伝(スーパーぶとうでん)3, Doragon Bōru Z Sūpā Butōden 3; Dragon Ball Z: Super Fighting Legend 3), called Dragon Ball Z: Ultime Menace in France and in Spain (although it was translated as Dragon Ball Z: La Última Amenaza for the Spanish instruction manual), is the third installment in the Super Butōden series. The game was released in Japan on September 29, 1994 and in France and Spain on January 25, 1995.; Super Butōden 3 features ten playable characters (9 normal, 1 unlockable with a code). It is the only game in the series that lacks a story mode.
Dragon Ball Z: Idainaru Son Goku Densetsu: JP: November 11, 1994; – PC Engine	Notes: Dragon Ball Z: Idainaru Son Goku Densetsu (ドラゴンボールZ 偉大なる孫悟空伝説, Doragon Bōru Z Idainaru Son Gokū Densetsu; Dragon Ball Z: The Greatest Son Goku Legend) was released for the PC Engine (the Japanese version of the TurboGrafx-16) on November 11, 1994. It features Gohan telling Goten of the battles of their deceased father, Goku, along with other characters. The game illustrates Goku's seven greatest battles: Fighting Tao Pai Pai, challenging Tienshinhan at the Tenkaichi Budokai, destroying King Piccolo, fighting Piccolo at the Tenkaichi Budokai, protecting Earth from Vegeta, saving Namek from Frieza, and sacrificing his life to save the world from Perfect Cell.
Dragon Ball Z: Goku Hishōden: JP: November 25, 1994; – Game Boy	Notes: Dragon Ball Z: Goku Hishōden (ドラゴンボールZ: 悟空飛翔伝, Doragon Bōru Z : Gokū Hishōden; Dragon Ball Z: Goku's Soaring Legend) is the first installment in the Goku RPG series, released on November 25, 1994. Despite the title, the game starts out during the end of Goku's fight with Piccolo at the World Martial Arts Tournament and ends with the battle against Vegeta.
Dragon Ball Z Gaiden: Saiyajin Zetsumetsu Keikaku~Uchū-Hen: JP: December 16, 1994; – Playdia	Notes: Dragon Ball Z Gaiden: Saiyan Zetsumetsu Keikaku~Uchū-Hen (ドラゴンボールZ外伝 真サイヤ人絶滅計画 宇宙編, Doragon Bōru Z Gaiden Shin Saiyajin Zetsumetsu Keikaku Uchū-Hen; Dragon Ball Z Side Story: True Plan to Eradicate the Saiyans: Universe Edition) is part two in the Saiyan Zetsumetsu Keikaku series. The game was released on December 16, 1994.
Dragon Ball Z: Super Goku Den — Totsugeki-Hen: JP: March 24, 1995; – Super Famicom	Notes: Dragon Ball Z: Super Goku Den — Totsugeki-Hen (ドラゴンボールZ 超悟空伝 突激編, Doragon Bōru Z Sūpā Gokū-den Totsugeki-hen; Dragon Ball Z: Super Goku's Story: Assault Arc) was released on March 24, 1995.; Totsugeki-Hen chronicles the adventures of Goku and his adventures through the start of Dragon Ball all the way to the final battle with King Piccolo.; A fan-made English translation was released in 2016.
Dragon Ball Z: Ultimate Battle 22: JP: July 28, 1995; EU: June 1996; NA: March 25, 2003; – PlayStation	Notes: Dragon Ball Z: Ultimate Battle 22 (ドラゴンボールZ アルティメイトバトル22, Doragon Bōru Z Arutimeito Batoru 22) is a fighting game released July 28, 1995 in Japan (re-released as PlayStation the Best for Family on December 6, 1996), released in Europe in June 1996, and released in North America 8 years later on March 25, 2003. The game features cel drawings from the animators as character sprites and three dimensional backgrounds. The playable characters are Goku, Gohan, Vegeta, Future Trunks, Cell, Android 16 (C16), Android 18 (C18), Frieza, Zarbon, Recoome, Captain Ginyu, Dabura, Goten, Kid Trunks, Supreme Kai, Fat Buu, Super Buu, Super Saiyan Gotenks, Great Saiyaman, Krillin, Tien, and Piccolo. Unlockable characters include Gogeta, Mr. Satan, Master Roshi, Super Saiyan 3 Goku, and Kid Goku.
Dragon Ball Z: Goku Gekitōden: JP: August 25, 1995; – Game Boy	Notes: Dragon Ball Z: Goku Gekitōden (ドラゴンボールZ: 悟空激闘伝, Doragon Bōru Z : Gokū Gekitōden; Dragon Ball Z: Goku's Fierce Battle Story) is the second installment in the Goku RPG series, released on August 25, 1995. It features five playable characters, as well as Goku's Super Saiyan transformation. Goku Gekitōden takes place immediately after Son Goku's battle with Vegeta, and ends with Son Goku's final battle with Freeza. In Goku Gekitōden, moving about and fighting is real time, unlike its predecessor. The game also features many extras, such as minigames and a tournament mode. Most characters from the Namek arc can be fought during the story mode, including ones such as Zarbon and Freeza's transformed states.
Dragon Ball Z: Super Goku Den — Kakusei-Hen: JP: September 22, 1995; – Super Famicom	Notes: Dragon Ball Z: Super Goku Den — Kakusei-Hen (ドラゴンボールZ 超悟空伝 覚醒編, Doragon Bōru Z Sūpā Gokū-den Kakusei-hen; Dragon Ball Z: Super Goku's Story: Awakening Arc) is the second game in the Super Gokuden series. The game was released on September 22, 1995.; Kakusei-Hen follows the story of Goku from his fight with Piccolo at the 23rd World Tournament to his final battle with Frieza after the latter had reached the Super Saiyan state.
Dragon Ball Z: Shin Butōden: JP: November 17, 1995; – Sega Saturn	Notes: Dragon Ball Z: Shin Butōden (ドラゴンボールZ 真武闘伝, Doragon Bōru Z Shin Butōden; Dragon Ball Z: True Fighting Legend) is the fourth installment in the Super Butōden series. The game was released only in Japan on November 17, 1995. The game features 27 playable characters, their sprites being those used in an earlier Dragon Ball Z game, Dragon Ball Z: Ultimate Battle 22. Its story mode ranges from the Android arc to the Cell Games. Shin Butōden also features two other exclusive modes: Group Battle and Mr. Satan mode. In Group Battle, players gets to create a team of five characters and fight against either another player or an AI-controlled character. In Mr. Satan mode, Mr. Satan is trying to raise enough money to pay off his debt to Android 18, and the player places bets on matches and cheats by using several items, such as banana peels, guns, and dynamite.
Dragon Ball Z: Hyper Dimension: JP: March 29, 1996; EU: February 1997; – Super Famicom	Notes: Dragon Ball Z: Hyper Dimension (ドラゴンボールZ ハイパー ディメンション, Doragon Bōru Z Haipā Dimenshon) is the last Dragon Ball Z fighting game released for the Super Famicom/SNES in Japan and Europe. It was released in Japan on March 29, 1996 and in France and Spain in February 1997.; The Japanese version of the game features a story mode that begins from the Frieza arc and ends at the end of the series. The amount of life for characters is measured by a number system from 1 to 999, which can be charged at any time during the match. When the life reaches a level below 80, the characters are able to perform "desperate moves", which cause a large amount of damage. The characters fight on a multi-tier stage, which allows opponents to hit each other to other stages. The playable characters are Goku, Vegeta, Gohan, Perfect Cell, Piccolo, Vegito, Frieza, Fat Buu, Kid Buu, and Gotenks.; Two fan-made English translations were released in 2000 and in 2010.
Dragon Ball Z: Idainaru Dragon Ball Densetsu Dragon Ball Z: The Legend: JP: May 31, 1996; EU: December 1996; – PlayStation, Sega Saturn	Notes: Dragon Ball Z: Idainaru Dragon Ball Densetsu (ドラゴンボールZ 偉大なるドラゴンボール伝説, Doragon Bōru Z Idainaru Doragon Bōru Densetsu; Dragon Ball Z: The Greatest Dragon Ball Legend) is a fighting game produced and released by Bandai on May 31, 1996 in Japan, released for the Sega Saturn and PlayStation. Greatest Hits versions were released on June 20, 1997 for the Saturn and June 27, 1997 for the PlayStation. In Europe, only the Sega Saturn version was released in France, Portugal and Spain on December 1996, with the French edition retaining the original Japanese name (although is translated as Dragon Ball Z: La grande légende des boules de cristal in the title screen) and the Spanish edition being re-addressed as Dragon Ball Z: The Legend. The game utilizes a unique system of play that is different from most other fighters and the graphics feature 2-D sprites in a three dimensional world.
Dragon Ball GT: Final Bout: JP: August 21, 1997; EU: November 2, 1997; NA: July 31, 1997; JP: July 23, 1998 (Greatest Hits); NA: August 24, 2004 (Reprint); EU: October 4, 2002 (Reprint); – PlayStation	Notes: Dragon Ball GT: Final Bout, known in Japan and Europe as Dragon Ball: Final Bout (ドラゴンボール ファイナルバウト, Doragon Bōru Fainaru Bauto?), is a fighting game for the PlayStation. It was produced and released by Bandai in Japan, parts of Europe, and North America in 1997. The game was reissued in Europe in 2002 and in North America in 2004. The game holds the distinctions of being the first Dragon Ball game released in North America, the first game in the series to be rendered in full 3D, and the last Dragon Ball game produced for the PlayStation. There would not be another new Dragon Ball game for consoles until the release of Dragon Ball Z: Budokai in 2002. The game is similar to other fighters but features 3D environments and characters from the Z and GT series. Unique in the game are the special ki attacks called a Special Knockout Trick. These are spectacular versions of the character's ki attacks which the player performs at a distance. When these attacks are performed, the camera cuts and pans to the attacking character, who powers up, and the player fires. During the attacking character's power up, the opposing character has the opportunity to either retaliate or block when the word counter flashes on the lower right hand corner of the screen. If the player retaliates, they too power up and fire a ki attack, causing a power crossfire. Which player presses their button the fastest determines who receives the brunt of the blast. A technique called Meteor Smash was carried over from Legends. With a key combo, players can ignite a chain of mêlée attacks.

=== 2000s ===
Home console and handheld games
Game	Details
Dragon Ball Z: Collectible CD Picture Cards: AU: 2001; – Windows / Macintosh	Notes: A series of 10 collectible pocket CD-ROMs released in 2001 exclusively in Australia and designed and produced by Streamedia Pty Ltd. Each CD-ROM featured a different character and contained information on the respective character and the Dragon Ball Z sagas, merchandise available to acquire and a "BattlePrint" activity mode. Each disc was available at random from packets and also given as part of a promotion with Coca-Cola products.
Dragon Ball Z: The Legacy of Goku: NA: May 14, 2002; EU: October 4, 2002; – Game Boy Advance	Notes: Dragon Ball Z: The Legacy of Goku is a series of video games for the Game Boy Advance, based on the anime series Dragon Ball Z. All three games are action role-playing games. The first game, Dragon Ball Z: The Legacy of Goku, was developed by Webfoot Technologies and released in 2002. The game was followed by two sequels: Dragon Ball Z: The Legacy of Goku II, released in 2003, and Dragon Ball Z: Buu's Fury, released in 2004. In 2016, Webfoot Technologies claimed to be starting development of another sequel.
Dragon Ball Z: Collectible Card Game: NA: May 29, 2002; – Game Boy Advance	Notes: Dragon Ball Z Collectible Card Game was released on May 29, 2002 by Atari. It is based on the Dragon Ball Z Collectible Card Game.
Dragon Ball Z: Legendary Super Warriors: JP: August 9, 2002; EU: June 30, 2002; NA: November 8, 2002; – Game Boy Color	Notes: Dragon Ball Z: Legendary Super Warriors (ドラゴンボールZ 伝説の超戦士たち, Doragon Bōru Z Densetsu no Chō Senshi Tachi) is a turn-based strategy game developed by Flight-Plan and released for the Game Boy Color by Banpresto. It was released in Europe on June 30, 2002, Japan on August 9, 2002, and North America on November 2002. It is played with the use of in-game cards for attacks, techniques and support items. The game's story takes place from the Saiyan arc, and runs until the end of the series. The game also includes two extra stories involving Future Trunks's timeline. The game boasts a large array of characters and forms for the various characters. The first playthrough selects one or two characters for each battle, and subsequent playthroughs allow the player to select various unlockable characters for any scenario.
Dragon Ball Z: Budokai Original release date(s): PlayStation 2: EU: November 2, 2002; NA: December 3, 2002; JP: February 13, 2003	Release years by system: 2002 - PlayStation 2; 2003 - GameCube; 2012 - PlayStation 3; 2012 - Xbox 360
Dragon Ball Z: Budokai Original release date(s): PlayStation 2: EU: November 2, 2002; NA: December 3, 2002; JP: February 13, 2003	Notes: Dragon Ball Z: Budokai, released as Dragon Ball Z (ドラゴンボールZ, Doragon Bōru Z ) in Japan, is a fighting video game developed by Dimps for PlayStation 2 release in 2002 and GameCube release in 2003. The first game in the Dragon Ball Z: Budokai series, it is based on the Japanese anime series Dragon Ball Z, part of the manga franchise Dragon Ball. It was published in Japan by Bandai and in North America by Infogrames, Inc., and was the first console Dragon Ball video game in five years since Dragon Ball GT: Final Bout (1997).
Dragon Ball Z: The Legacy of Goku II: NA: June 17, 2003; EU: August 1, 2003; JP: July 23, 2004; – Game Boy Advance	
Dragon Ball Z: Budokai 2 Original release date(s): PlayStation 2: EU: November 14, 2003; AU: November 23, 2003; NA: December 4, 2003; JP: February 5, 2004	Release years by system: 2003 - PlayStation 2; 2004 - GameCube
Dragon Ball Z: Budokai 2 Original release date(s): PlayStation 2: EU: November 14, 2003; AU: November 23, 2003; NA: December 4, 2003; JP: February 5, 2004	Notes: Dragon Ball Z: Budokai 2, released as Dragon Ball Z2 (ドラゴンボールZ2, Doragon Bōru Z 2) in Japan, is a fighting video game developed by Dimps based upon the anime and manga series, Dragon Ball Z, it is a sequel to Dragon Ball Z: Budokai for the PlayStation 2 release in 2003 and GameCube release in 2004. It was published in Japan and Europe by Bandai and in North America and Australia by Atari.
Dragon Ball: JP: November 20, 2003; – WonderSwan Color	Notes: Remake of the third Dragon Ball game for the Family Computer.
Dragon Ball Z: Taiketsu: NA: November 24, 2003; – Game Boy Advance	
Dragon Ball Z: Supersonic Warriors: JP: March 26, 2004; NA: June 22, 2004; EU: August 27, 2004; – Game Boy Advance	Notes: Dragon Ball Z: Bukū Tōgeki (ドラゴンボールZ 舞空闘劇, Doragon Bōru Z Bukū Tōgeki; Dragon Ball Z: Skydive Battle Play)
Dragon Ball Z: Buu's Fury: NA: September 14, 2004; – Game Boy Advance	
Dragon Ball Z: Budokai 3 Original release date(s): NA: November 16, 2004; EU: November 19, 2004; AU: November 26, 2004; JP: February 10, 2005	Release years by system: 2004 - PlayStation 2; 2012 - PlayStation 3; 2012 - Xbox 360
Dragon Ball Z: Budokai 3 Original release date(s): NA: November 16, 2004; EU: November 19, 2004; AU: November 26, 2004; JP: February 10, 2005	Notes: Dragon Ball Z: Budokai 3, released as Dragon Ball Z3 (ドラゴンボールZ3, Doragon Bōru Z 3) in Japan, is a video game based on the popular anime series Dragon Ball Z and was developed by Dimps for the PlayStation 2. The Japanese version of Dragon Ball Z: Budokai 3 had outfits that the other versions did not have. Trunks' 3rd outfit was Long Hair with Armor, Piccolo's was his father King Piccolo and Goku's third outfit was him with a Halo. Some games in this Japanese version had some glitches such as Bulma appearing as an outfit for Videl, when the game was complete. While the American version of the game only had two movie clips to unlock (the instrumental and vocal openings from Budokai 2), many fans thought there were extra movies to unlock, since the American strategy guide indicated that there were two additional "Baba's Crystal Ball" capsules to purchase.
Dragon Ball: Advanced Adventure: JP: November 18, 2004; EU: June 17, 2005; NA: June 6, 2006; – Game Boy Advance	Notes: The game follows the story of the original manga series, chronicling a young Goku's adventures across every story arc leading up to the battle against King Piccolo.
Dragon Ball Z: Sagas Original release date(s): NA: March 22, 2005	Release years by system: 2005- GameCube, PlayStation 2, Xbox
Dragon Ball Z: Sagas Original release date(s): NA: March 22, 2005	Notes: The first Dragon Ball Z console game to be developed by a non-Japanese developer (American in this case), and the first Dragon Ball Z game to be released on a non-Japanese console: the Xbox. Sagas is a linear combat-focused game with new abilities becoming available via upgrade. There are three basic fighting styles: Melee, Combo, and Ki. Melee attacks are often swift and leave the opponent temporarily stunned. Combo attacks are several consecutive punches or kicks to the opponent which may contain up to 10 hits. Ki attacks are energy blasts that rely on a rechargeable meter for power. The most powerful Ki blast is the "Special Move" found in the first level. Each character has their own special Ki blast, but they all have very similar properties.
Dragon Ball GT: Transformation: NA: August 9, 2005; – Game Boy Advance	Notes: Developed by Webfoot Technologies
Dragon Ball Z: Budokai Tenkaichi Original release date(s): JP: October 6, 2005; NA: October 18, 2005; EU: October 21, 2005	Release years by system: 2005 - PlayStation 2
Dragon Ball Z: Budokai Tenkaichi Original release date(s): JP: October 6, 2005; NA: October 18, 2005; EU: October 21, 2005	Notes: Dragon Ball Z: Budokai Tenkaichi (released in Japan as Dragon Ball Z: Sparking! (ドラゴンボールZ Sparking!)) is a series of fighting games developed by Spike based on the Dragon Ball manga series by Akira Toriyama. The series was published by Namco Bandai Games under the Bandai brand name in Japan and Europe, and as Atari in North America and Australia from 2005 to 2007. Atari's PAL distribution network was absorbed into Bandai Namco Partners and Bandai Namco has also handled publishing in North America for future Dragon Ball Z games since 2010, effectively ending Atari's involvement.
Dragon Ball Z: Supersonic Warriors 2: JP: December 1, 2005; NA: November 20, 2005; EU: February 3, 2006; AU: December 8, 2005; – Nintendo DS	Notes: Released in Japan as
Super Dragon Ball Z Original release date(s): Arcade: JP: December 22, 2005; PlayStation 2: JP: June 29, 2006; NA: July 18, 2006; PAL: July 28, 2006	Release years by system: 2005 - Arcade; 2006 - PlayStation 2
Super Dragon Ball Z Original release date(s): Arcade: JP: December 22, 2005; PlayStation 2: JP: June 29, 2006; NA: July 18, 2006; PAL: July 28, 2006	Notes: Super Dragon Ball Z (Japanese: 超スーパードラゴンボールZ, Hepburn: Sūpā Doragonbōru Z ) is a cel-shaded 3D fighting video game, based on the Japanese manga series Dragon Ball created by Akira Toriyama. It was released in Japanese (December 22, 2005) and European (2006) arcades running on System 256 hardware, and later for the PlayStation 2 (Japan: June 29, 2006; US, July 18, 2006; PAL, July 28, 2006). The game was developed by Arika and Crafts & Meister, headed by Noritaka Funamizu (a former Capcom fighting game producer who worked on the Street Fighter series and Darkstalkers). The game features 18 playable characters, destructible environments, and a game engine geared towards fans of more traditional fighting games.
Dragon Ball Z: Shin Budokai: JP: April 20, 2006; NA: March 7, 2006; EU: May 25, 2006; – PlayStation Portable	
Dragon Ball Z: Budokai Tenkaichi 2 Original release date(s): PlayStation 2: JP: October 5, 2006; EU: November 3, 2006; NA: November 7, 2006	Release years by system: 2006 - PlayStation 2; 2006 - Wii
Dragon Ball Z: Harukanaru Densetsu: JP: March 21, 2007; NA: June 5, 2007; EU: August 31, 2007; AU: 2007; – Nintendo DS	Notes: The game was released internationally using its Japanese title, which translates to Dragon Ball Z: The Distant Legend of Goku.
Dragon Ball Z: Shin Budokai - Another Road: JP: June 7, 2007; NA: March 20, 2007; EU: June 22, 2007; AU: June 29, 2007; – PlayStation Portable	
Dragon Ball Z: Budokai Tenkaichi 3 Original release date(s): PlayStation 2: JP: October 4, 2007; EU: November 9, 2007; NA: November 13, 2007	Release years by system: 2007 - PlayStation 2; 2007 - Wii
Dragon Ball Z: Budokai Tenkaichi 3 Original release date(s): PlayStation 2: JP: October 4, 2007; EU: November 9, 2007; NA: November 13, 2007	Notes: Dragon Ball Z: Budokai Tenkaichi (released in Japan as Dragon Ball Z: Sparking! (ドラゴンボールZ Sparking!)) is a series of fighting games developed by Spike based on the Dragon Ball manga series by Akira Toriyama. The series was published by Namco Bandai Games under the Bandai brand name in Japan and Europe, and as Atari in North America and Australia from 2005 to 2007. Atari's PAL distribution network was absorbed into Bandai Namco Partners and Bandai Namco has also handled publishing in North America for future Dragon Ball Z games since 2010, effectively ending Atari's involvement.
Dragon Ball Z: Burst Limit Original release date(s): JP: June 5, 2008; EU: June 6, 2008; NA: June 10, 2008; AU: July 3, 2008	Release years by system: 2008 - PlayStation 3, Xbox 360
Dragon Ball Z: Burst Limit Original release date(s): JP: June 5, 2008; EU: June 6, 2008; NA: June 10, 2008; AU: July 3, 2008	Notes: Dragon Ball Z: Burst Limit (ドラゴンボールZ バーストリミット, Doragon Bōru Z Bāsuto Rimitto) is a fighting video game for the PlayStation 3 and Xbox 360 based on the anime Dragon Ball Z. The game was developed by Dimps and published in North America and Australia by Atari, and in Japan and Europe by Namco Bandai under the Bandai label. It was released in Japan on June 5, 2008, in Europe on June 6, 2008, North America on June 10, 2008, and in Australia on July 3, 2008.
Dragon Ball: Origins: JP: September 18, 2008; NA: November 4, 2008; EU: December 5, 2008; AU: December 4, 2008; KOR: December 11, 2008; – Nintendo DS	
Dragon Ball Z: Infinite World Original release date(s): JP: December 4, 2008; NA: December 4, 2008; EU: December 5, 2008	Release years by system: 2008 - PlayStation 2
Dragonball Evolution: JP: March 19, 2009; NA: April 8, 2009; EU: April 17, 2009; – PlayStation Portable	
Dragon Ball Z: Attack of the Saiyans: JP: April 29, 2009; EU: November 6, 2009; NA: November 10, 2009; AU: November 5, 2009; – Nintendo DS	
Dragon Ball: Revenge of King Piccolo Original release date(s): JP: July 23, 2009; AU: October 15, 2009; NA: October 20, 2009; EU: October 30, 2009	Release years by system: 2009 - Wii
Dragon Ball: Revenge of King Piccolo Original release date(s): JP: July 23, 2009; AU: October 15, 2009; NA: October 20, 2009; EU: October 30, 2009	Notes: Released in Japan as Dragon Ball: World's Greatest Adventure (ドラゴンボール天下一大冒険, Doragon Bōru Tenka-ichi Dai-Bōken)
Dragon Ball: Raging Blast Original release date(s): JP: November 12, 2009; NA: November 10, 2009; EU: November 13, 2009; AU: November 19, 2009	Release years by system: 2009 - PlayStation 3, Xbox 360

=== 2010s ===
Home console and handheld games
Game	Details
Dragon Ball: Origins 2: JP: February 11, 2010; NA: June 22, 2010; EU: July 2, 2010; – Nintendo DS	
Dragon Ball Z: Tenkaichi Tag Team: JP: September 30, 2010; NA: October 19, 2010; EU: October 22, 2010; AU: October 21, 2010; – PlayStation Portable	
Dragon Ball: Raging Blast 2 Original release date(s): JP: November 11, 2010; EU: November 5, 2010; NA: November 2, 2010	Release years by system: 2010 - PlayStation 3, Xbox 360
Dragon Ball Online: AS: 2010; – Windows	Notes: First MMORPG based in the Dragon Ball universe.; Servers shut down in October 2013.
Dragon Ball Kai: Ultimate Butōden: JP: February 4, 2011; – Nintendo DS	
Dragon Ball Z: Ultimate Tenkaichi Original release date(s): NA: October 25, 2011; EU: October 28, 2011; JP: December 8, 2011	Release years by system: 2011 - PlayStation 3, Xbox 360
Dragon Ball Z: For Kinect Original release date(s): NA: October 9, 2012; EU: October 5, 2012	Release years by system: 2012 - Xbox 360
Dragon Ball Z: Budokai HD Collection Original release date(s): NA: November 6, 2012; EU: November 2, 2012	Release years by system: 2012 - PlayStation 3, Xbox 360
Dragon Ball Heroes: Ultimate Mission: JP: February 28, 2013; – Nintendo 3DS	
Dragon Ball Z: Battle of Z Original release date(s): JP: January 23, 2014; EU: January 24, 2014; NA: January 28, 2014	Release years by system: 2014 - PlayStation 3, Xbox 360, PlayStation Vita
Dragon Ball Heroes: Ultimate Mission 2: JP: August 7, 2014; – Nintendo 3DS	
Dragon Ball Xenoverse Original release date(s): JP: February 5, 2015; EU: February 27, 2015; NA: February 24, 2015	Release years by system: 2015 - PlayStation 3, PlayStation 4, Xbox 360, Xbox One, Windows
Dragon Ball Z: Extreme Butōden: JP: June 11, 2015; NA: October 20, 2015; EU: October 16, 2015; AU: October 16, 2015; – Nintendo 3DS	Notes: For those who pre-ordered the game this game through Amazon would receive an email with a code to download the Japanese version of Dragon Ball Z: Super Butoden 2 They would also receive 6 extra Z Assist support characters via an additional code sent a few days following the games release. This extra content was also available through pre-ordering the game digitally via the Nintendo eShop or through purchasing the Dragon Ball Z: Extreme Butōden New 3DS bundle.
Dragon Ball Fusions: JP: August 4, 2016; NA: November 22, 2016; EU: February 17, 2017; AU: February 17, 2017; – Nintendo 3DS	
Dragon Ball Xenoverse 2 Original release date(s): JP: November 2, 2016; EU: October 28, 2016; NA: October 25, 2016	Release years by system: 2016 - PlayStation 4, Xbox One, Windows; 2017 - Nintendo Switch; 2024 - PlayStation 5, Xbox Series X/S
Dragon Ball Heroes: Ultimate Mission X: JP: April 27, 2017; – Nintendo 3DS	
Dragon Ball FighterZ Original release date(s): WW: January 26, 2018; JP: February 1, 2018	Release years by system: 2018 - PlayStation 4, Xbox One, Nintendo Switch, Windows; 2024 - PlayStation 5, Xbox Series X/S
Super Dragon Ball Heroes: World Mission Original release date(s): WW: April 5, 2019	Release years by system: 2019 - Nintendo Switch, Windows

=== 2020s ===
Home console and handheld games
Game	Details
Dragon Ball Z: Kakarot Original release date(s): JP: January 16, 2020; WW: January 17, 2020	Release years by system: 2020 - Windows, PlayStation 4, Xbox One; 2021 - Nintendo Switch; 2023 - PlayStation 5, Xbox Series X/S
Dragon Ball Z: Kakarot Original release date(s): JP: January 16, 2020; WW: January 17, 2020	Notes: Action role-playing game.
Dragon Ball: The Breakers Original release date(s): JP: October 13, 2022; WW: October 14, 2022	Release years by system: 2022 - Windows, Nintendo Switch, PlayStation 4, Xbox One
Dragon Ball: The Breakers Original release date(s): JP: October 13, 2022; WW: October 14, 2022	Notes: Asymmetrical multiplayer game, in the same vein as Dead by Daylight.
Dragon Ball Super Card Game Fusion World Original release date(s): February 24, 2024	Release years by system: 2024 - Windows; 2025 - macOS
Dragon Ball Super Card Game Fusion World Original release date(s): February 24, 2024	Notes: An online digital collectible card game.
Dragon Ball: Sparking! Zero Original release date(s): JP: October 10, 2024; WW: October 11, 2024	Release years by system: 2024 - Windows, PlayStation 5, Xbox Series X/S; 2025 - Nintendo Switch, Nintendo Switch 2
Dragon Ball: Sparking! Zero Original release date(s): JP: October 10, 2024; WW: October 11, 2024	Notes: A fighting game.; An entry in the Budokai Tenkaichi subseries; first to be released under the Sparking name outside of Japan.
Dragon Ball: Gekishin Squadra Original release date(s): JP: September 10, 2025; WW: September 9, 2025	Release years by system: 2025 - Windows, PlayStation 4, PlayStation 5, Nintendo Switch, Nintendo Switch 2
Dragon Ball: Gekishin Squadra Original release date(s): JP: September 10, 2025; WW: September 9, 2025	Notes: A Multiplayer online battle arena.
Dragon Ball Xenoverse 3 Original release date(s): TBA	Release years by system: 2027 - Windows, PlayStation 5, Xbox Series X/S
Dragon Ball Xenoverse 3 Original release date(s): TBA	Notes: A fighting game.; An entry in the Xenoverse subseries.

== Arcade games ==
=== 1990s ===
Game	Details
Dragon Ball Z Original release date(s): 1993	Release years by system:
Dragon Ball Z Original release date(s): 1993	Notes: Dragon Ball Z (ドラゴンボールZ, Doragon Bōru Z) is a fighting game developed and published in Japan by Banpresto in 1993. The game's cabinet is shaped like a robot with markings similar to Goku's gi. The game features large sprites and a color palete that is identical Toriyama's water color scheme in the manga. The environments are semi destructible as chunks of wall or ground could be destroyed. The controls are unique as most of the characters movements are flight related. The playable characters are Goku, Super Saiyan Goku, Gohan, Vegeta, Piccolo, Frieza, Captain Ginyu, Recoome, and Burter.
Dragon Ball Z 2: Super Battle 1994 – Arcade	Notes: Dragon Ball Z 2: Super Battle (ドラゴンボールZ 2 スパーバトル, Doragon Bōru Z 2 Supā Batoru) the sequel to Dragon Ball Z released in 1994, also produced by Banpresto. The gameplay matches the Butōden series of games rather than the previous arcade game. The characters are Goku, Gohan, Vegeta, Future Trunks, Piccolo, Cell, Android 16, Android 18, Android 20, and Mr. Satan.
Dragon Ball Z: V.R.V.S. Original release date(s): 1994	Release years by system:
Dragon Ball Z: V.R.V.S. Original release date(s): 1994	Notes: Dragon Ball Z: V.R.V.S. is a fighting game released in 1994 for the Sega System 32 arcade platform by Sega and Banpresto. Although the game is in 2D, it uses camera angles positioned behind the characters to create a 3D-like experience. The standard cabinet version is controlled with a joysick and 3 buttons, while the deluxe edition of the game features motion sensors that allow the player to move his or her body to control the character in the game; the latter was considered original for its time. The object of the game is to defeat six opponents. The playable characters are Goku, Gohan, Piccolo, Vegeta, and Future Trunks. The final boss is an original character named Ozotto. A port of the game for the 3DO was in development titled Dragon Ball Z: Cell To Kogeki Da and would feature Cell instead of Ozotto. The game was playable at a Japanese convention however it was never released.

=== 2000s ===
Game	Details
Super Dragon Ball Z Original release date(s): December 22, 2005	Release years by system:
Super Dragon Ball Z Original release date(s): December 22, 2005	Notes: Same game that was later ported to the PlayStation 2.
Data Carddass Dragon Ball Z Original release date(s):	Release years by system:
Data Carddass Dragon Ball Z 2 Original release date(s): April 2006	Release years by system:
Dragon Ball Z: Bakuretsu Impact Original release date(s): March 16, 2007	Release years by system:
Dragon Ball Z: Bakuretsu Impact Original release date(s): March 16, 2007	Notes: Dragon Ball Z: Bakuretsu Impact (ドラゴンボールZ 爆烈インパクト, Doragon Bōru Z Bakuretsu Inpakuto; Dragon Ball Z: Burst Impact) is the third card-based fighting game for Bandai's Data Carddass arcade system. It was developed by Dimps and released on March 16, 2007 in Japan only by Bandai.
Dragon Ball Z: W Bakuretsu Impact Original release date(s): May 14, 2008	Release years by system:
Dragon Ball Z: W Bakuretsu Impact Original release date(s): May 14, 2008	Notes: Dragon Ball Z: W Bakuretsu Impact (ドラゴンボールZ W爆烈インパクト, Doragon Bōru Z Daburu Bakuretsu Inpakuto; Dragon Ball Z: W Burst Impact) is the fourth card-based fighting game released on Bandai's Data Carddass arcade system. The playable characters are Goku, Gohan, Vegeta, Piccolo, Kid Goku, Pan, Future Trunks, Goten, Gotenks, Arale Norimaki, Majin Buu, Super Buu, Kid Buu, Broly, Super 17, Nova Shenron, Omega Shenron, and Mighty Mask.
Dragon Ball Z: Dragon Battlers Original release date(s): April 21, 2009	Release years by system:

=== 2010s ===
Game	Details
Dragon Ball Heroes Original release date(s): November 11, 2010	Release years by system:
Dragon Ball: Zenkai Battle Royale Original release date(s): February 4, 2011	Release years by system:
Dragon Ball: Zenkai Battle Royale Original release date(s): February 4, 2011	Notes: First arcade game that uses GGPO middleware for network/internet play.

== Mobile games ==
=== 2000s ===
Game	Details
Dragon Radar Mobile: JP: January 2007; – LCD game	Notes: Dragon Radar Mobile (ドラゴンレーダーモバイル, Doragon Rēdā Mobairu) is a handheld LCD game that is produced by Bandai exclusively in Japan in January 2007. The game is featured in the shape of the dragon radar from the series and comes in either the standard white or orange colors which are listed as "Dragon Radar Mobile: White" and "Dragon Radar Mobile: Orange". The game features two distinct modes of play, a battle game and a search game. The game controls are determined by the player's hand movement by a motion device, and features a "accelerometer" that determines the strength of the players attacks by how hard the player shakes the device. Players can also compete with other players courtesy of an infrared sensor which can detect other radars for two player mode.
Dragon Ball Nyūmon! Kamesenryū: JP: October 15, 2007; – Mobile	Notes: It is part of Dragon Ball Mobile series.
Dragon Ball Pinball: JP: October 15, 2007; – Mobile	Notes: It is part of Dragon Ball Mobile series.
Dragon Ball Satoshi Meshi to oi Kakekko!: JP: October 15, 2007; – Mobile	Notes: It is part of Dragon Ball Mobile series.
Dragon Ball Z Othello: JP: October 15, 2007; – Mobile	Notes: It is part of Dragon Ball Mobile series.
Dragon Ball Z Ultimate Blast: JP: October 15, 2007; – Mobile	Notes: It is part of Dragon Ball Mobile series.
Dragon Ball Sugoroku: JP: April 14, 2008; – Mobile	Notes: A Dragon Ball-themed for Sugoroku Mobile Game.
Dragon Ball RPG: JP: August 5, 2008; – Mobile	
Dragon Ball Mobile in Muscle Tower's Action: JP: January 22, 2009; – Mobile	

=== 2010s ===
Game	Details
Dragon Ball Tap Battle: JP: March 26, 2013; – Mobile	Notes: Dragon Ball: Tap Battle (ドラゴンボール タップバトル Doragon Bōru Z Tappu Batoru) is a fighting game based on Dragon Ball Z. Tap Battle is a 2D action-fighting game for mobile platforms. It has direct control by touching the screen, and it features a two-player mode available via Bluetooth connection, letting players play against each other just by having their phones close to each other. By tapping the screen with fingers, the player can cause an intense battle to unfold and enjoy the genuine fighting action of Dragon Ball on their smartphone. Correctly tapping the screen during "Super Break Fight" action events allow to deal massive damage to the opponent. Utilizing the smartphone's sense of control to its greatest extent, super-high-speed fights are possible.
Dragon Ball Z: Dokkan Battle Original release date(s): JP: January 30, 2015; WW: July 16, 2015	Release years by system: 2015 - Android, iOS
Dragon Ball Z: Dokkan Battle Original release date(s): JP: January 30, 2015; WW: July 16, 2015	Notes: Dragon Ball Z: Dokkan Battle is a free-to-play mobile game based on the Dragon Ball anime franchise. Developed by Akatsuki and published by Bandai Namco Entertainment, it was released in Japan for Android on January 30, 2015 and for iOS on February 19, 2015.
Dragon Ball Legends Original release date(s): NA: May 18, 2018; WW: May 28, 2018	Release years by system: 2018 - Android, iOS
Dragon Ball Legends Original release date(s): NA: May 18, 2018; WW: May 28, 2018	Notes: It has grossed over $140 million as of January 2019, and received 40 million downloads as of March 2021. The game's main protagonist is an amnesiac Saiyan by the name of Shallot, created and designed by original author Akira Toriyama specifically for the game.
Dragon Ball: Awakening Original release date(s): CH: February 26, 2019	Release years by system: 2019 - Android, iOS
Dragon Ball: Awakening Original release date(s): CH: February 26, 2019	Notes: Dragon Ball: Awakening (Chinese: 龍珠覺醒), also known as Dragon Ball Awakening or Dragon Ball Z: Awakening, is a digital collectible card game (DCCG) published by CMGE exclusively in China. It was initially made available for beta testing in 2018, before it received a full release in February 2019.

=== 2020s ===
Game	Details
Dragon Ball: Gekishin Squadra Original release date(s): NA: September 9, 2025; WW: September 9, 2025	Release years by system: 2025 - Android, iOS
