= Dragon Ball Z: Dokkan Battle =

2015 video game

- Developer: Akatsuki Games
- Publisher: Bandai Namco Entertainment
- Series: Dragon Ball
- Platforms: Android iOS iPadOS
- Release: JP: January 30, 2015; (Android): JP: February 18, 2015; (iOS): WW: July 16, 2015
- Mode: Single-player

Dragon Ball Z: Dokkan Battle (Japanese: ドラゴンボールZ ドッカンバトル) is a free-to-play mobile game based on the Dragon Ball anime franchise. Developed by Akatsuki and published by Bandai Namco Entertainment, it was released in Japan for Android on January 30, 2015, and for iOS on February 18, 2015. Dokkan Battle was eventually released worldwide for iOS and Android on July 16, 2015. The game has exceeded 400 million downloads worldwide, and has grossed over $3 billion in worldwide revenue.

== Gameplay ==
The game includes elements of board game, collectible card game, and puzzle genres. The main game is made up of levels that work similarly to board games, with spots dedicated to items, power-ups, traps, and fights.

=== Character Collecting ===
Dragon Ball Z: Dokkan Battle is a gacha game, meaning to obtain many characters, the player must spend in-game currency to randomly summon and have a chance at getting a certain character. There are 6 rarities: N, R, SR, SSR, UR, and LR. Only N, R, SR, SSR and some UR and LR characters are obtainable through summoning; There are some SSR, UR, and LR units available in the Baba's Coin Shop; Almost all UR and LR characters are obtained through Dokkan Awakening. When a player obtains a character, they can Z-Awaken and Dokkan Awaken the character by obtaining awakening medals, and leveling up the character through training. These characters can be used during fights, and different characters have different abilities.

==== Types of Banners ====
There are several types of banners to summon and obtain characters from. Dokkan Festivals introduce new Dokkan Festival Exclusives (DFEs), and usually come with a side banner unit that are unfeatured on future banners. They typically have 10 featured units, including the new unit, the side banner unit, and 8 older exclusives. Legendary Summon and Carnival Summon banners are very similar, introducing new characters that can Dokkan Awaken into LR. Carnival Summons come during major celebrations and introduce Carnival Exclusive units, while units that are introduced from Legendary Summon banners show up unfeatured on both future Legendary Summon and Carnival Summon banners. There are sometimes other banners related to special events. In May 2026, They started to release Alternative Art characters, with the only featured units being the character getting an Alternative Art.

In addition to being able to summon characters with Dragon Stones, there are special banners that you need tickets to summon on. These include tickets from events, the World Tournament mode, and paid tickets. There is a Friend Point Summon, where you can spend Friend Points to get N, R, and SR Characters, and resources like Hercule Statues and Elder Kais. During major celebrations, there are ways to spend large amounts of Friend Points in large summons.

=== Map Mechanics ===
3 randomly selected numbers (up to 6) are generated for the player to choose when moving across the map. Some fights force the player to stop, while some allow the player to pass over the tile. Once the player reaches the end of the level, there is a yellow star, which ends the level.

=== Fight Mechanics ===
During the fights, the player's characters fight with an enemy via a puzzle system similar to match-3 games.

==== Ki Orbs ====
Multiple orbs of different colors are placed between the player's character and the enemy, and the player can match different kinds of orbs to do attacks. There are 5 types in the game, with each character and orb corresponding to one, and they are all represented as colors. These types include STR being red, PHY being yellow, INT being purple, TEQ being green, and AGL being blue. Some types are effective to others, dealing more damage and taking less damage. Each orb collected gives one Ki, and gathering an orb of the same type also gives double the Ki. Gathering 12 Ki allows a character to perform a Super Attack, and gathering 18 Ki allows LR class characters to perform an Ultra Super Attack, maxing out at 24 Ki. After a certain number of orb matches, the player unlocks "Dokkan Mode" for one of their characters, which requires them to swipe over 7 targets in a Z-shaped configuration quickly as a Ki orb passes over them. This allows that character to unleash a super attack that is much more powerful than the typical super attack.

==== Character Stats and Super Attack Effects ====
Each character has a base health, attack, and defense stat. These can be increased by leveling up the character, awakening the character, or activating their hidden potential. Characters also have Super Attack effects prebuilt into their Super Attacks, some including permanent attack and defense buffs, while others can stun the enemy.

==== Passive Skills ====
One of the main mechanics that characters use are Passive Skills. These are viewable from the card screen, and tell the player what the character's abilities are. Abilities include: increasing attack, increasing defense, raising ki, damage reduction, guarding against attacks, evading enemy attacks, performing additional attacks, performing critical hits, and foreseeing enemy super attacks. Passive Skills can have conditions for activating certain sections, like taking damage or performing an attack.

==== Boss Attacks ====
The enemy, also called bosses, are what the player fights in-game. There are 3 slots for every turn, with the boss attacking in each of them. The boss can super before and after the character's super attack on the slot one character, while only attacking after in slot two or three. Sometimes, the boss does their own super attack, dealing more damage. Bosses have their own skills: Increasing their attack and defense, lowering your attack and defense, locking your slots, and stunning or sealing your characters.

=== Team Building and Leader Skills ===
There can be six characters on a team, 7 when including the friend character. When building a team, a player must consider which categories or types the leader gives buffs to. For example, if the leader gives "Kamehameha" category Ki+3 and Attack and Defense + 170%, the player would search for characters who include that category. Players must also consider link skills. Each character has a set of links, which give additional buffs if 2 characters have the same links and are next to each other. So, the player must choose characters with similar link skills, to give cohesion to the team. Another thing players should consider is balancing types. It would be wise to have every type included on the team. The last thing that players should consider is having multiple character types. There should be at least one character with high defense and defensive mechanics. There should also be a few characters who can deal damage, and support the rest of the team.

=== Types of Events ===
In Dokkan, there are multiple types of events, including Story, Growth, Awakening, Challenge, and Extreme Z Battle/Area. Story allows the player to relive certain moments in the Dragon Ball Z franchise, by fighting characters from the story. Growth events allow the player to level up their characters or obtain items to strengthen them. Awakening Events give awakening medals specifically for Dokkan Festival Exclusive characters. Challenge events are for experienced players, who want to fight a boss that can even give the new, premium characters a close match. Extreme Z Battle/Area events are to awaken older characters, who have aged out of the meta, to make them usable in challenge events again.

== Reception ==
Reception

Aggregate score
Aggregator	Score
Metacritic	71/100

Review score
Publication	Score
TouchArcade	3/5

The game reached 15 million downloads within three months when it was released in Japan. The game reached 100 million downloads worldwide in November 2016. In April 2017, it topped the iPhone gross revenue chart in the United States, where it had close to 1.5 million downloads and grossed more than $26 million from nearly $18 average revenue per user. By July 2017, the game had released in 50 countries, reaching number 1 on the App Store in 16 countries, reaching 200 million downloads worldwide. By August 2018, the game had exceeded 250 million downloads worldwide. As of August 2019, the game has exceeded 300 million downloads worldwide. As of August 2021, the game has exceeded 350 million downloads worldwide. As of August 2026, the game has exceeded 400 million downloads worldwide.

In Japan, the game grossed at least ¥73.9 billion ($467 million) between 2017 and 2018, including ¥27.8 billion between January 2017 and October 3, 2017 (the year's fifth top-grossing mobile game), and ¥46.1 billion in 2018 (again the year's fifth top-grossing mobile game). In China, the game grossed ¥2.8 billion ($18 million) in 2017. In the United States, the Google Play version grossed $6.18 million in November 2017, and was the month's seventh top-grossing Play Store app. By July 2018, the game had amassed over $1 billion in worldwide revenue, including approximately $400 million from outside of Japan, and about $200 million in the United States. By November 2019, the game had grossed over $2 billion worldwide. As of August 2021, the game has grossed over $3 billion worldwide.

== Gacha scandal ==
On November 14, 2017, a new character Kefla (ケフラ) was advertised to be added into the gacha (loot box) pool, but only a few players were able to draw her successfully. The majority failed to spot Kefla's presence in the list of possible loot drops. This led to suspicion that the developer had intentionally manipulated Kefla's drop rate, so most players would pour a lot of money into the game in an attempt to draw her in vain, while maintaining the illusion that she was still in the drop pool. Soon after the rumor went public, the developer stopped the gacha function and denied user access to the list of gacha drops temporarily, explaining that the issue was an unintentional mistake. They then gave 300 Dragon Stones to all players on the Japanese servers as well as a full Dragon Stone refund to anyone who spent them on the banner she was meant to be on. Another gacha scandal, was when STR Ultra Instinct Sign Goku was released on the global version, but however, a bug in the code made those who pulled Ultra Instinct Goku, were instead given a Super Saiyan 3 Goku card.
