= Dragon Ball FighterZ =

2018 2.5D Dragon Ball fighting game

- Developer: Arc System Works
- Publisher: Bandai Namco Entertainment
- Director: Junya C Motomura
- Producers: Toshimichi Mori; Tomoko Hiroki
- Designer: Ryosuke Kodani
- Programmer: Takuro Kayumi
- Artist: Katsuki Mukai
- Composers: Toshiyuki Kishi; Hiromi Mizutani; Kenji Katoh; Reno
- Series: Dragon Ball
- Engine: Unreal Engine 4
- Platforms: PlayStation 4; Windows; Xbox One; Nintendo Switch; PlayStation 5; Xbox Series X/S
- Release: PS4, Xbox One: WW: January 26, 2018; JP: February 1, 2018; Windows: WW: January 26, 2018; JP: May 23, 2024; Nintendo Switch: JP: September 27, 2018; WW: September 28, 2018; PS5, Xbox Series X/S: WW: February 29, 2024
- Genre: Fighting
- Modes: Single-player, multiplayer

Dragon Ball FighterZ (Note: Doragon Bōru Faitāzu (Japanese: ドラゴンボール ファイターズ) in Japanese) (pronounced "fighters") is a 2.5D fighting game developed by Arc System Works and published by Bandai Namco Entertainment. Based on the Dragon Ball franchise, it was released for the PlayStation 4, Windows, and Xbox One, in most regions in January 2018, and in Japan the following month, and was released worldwide for the Nintendo Switch in September 2018. Versions for PlayStation 5 and Xbox Series X/S were released in February 2024 alongside an update adding rollback netcode for these versions and Windows.

Dragon Ball FighterZ involves the player picking a team of three playable characters and a unique assist for each, then fighting an AI or human opponent with their own team of three characters. The game received positive reviews from critics, with many citing the game as one of the best fighting games released in the eighth generation of video game consoles. The game's fighting system, character roster, visuals, story mode, and music were all highly praised while its online functionality was criticized. The game was also a commercial success, having sold 10 million copies worldwide as of May 2023.

== Gameplay ==
The gameplay is inspired by concepts from several other fighting games. Namely, the control scheme and team mechanics are lifted from the Marvel vs. Capcom series and the overall presentation is reminiscent of other Arc System Works games, such as Guilty Gear Xrd. Players each select three characters to form a team, from an initial roster of characters from the Dragon Ball franchise. One character is controlled and can be switched with one of the other characters at any time. Players can also call one of their other characters to perform an "Assist" move, allowing simultaneous attacks and combos with the entire team. All three characters on the same team must be defeated for a player to win the game. If neither team has been defeated before the time runs out, the team that has sustained the least damage overall wins.

In addition to the unique moves of each character, players have several universal moves available. With the "Vanish Attack", the player can expend Ki to instantly teleport behind an opponent's character and strike them in the back. This has multiple uses, from bypassing enemy projectiles to moving quickly around the stage, or extending a combo. The "Dragon Rush" move can break through an opponent's guard and if successful, offers a choice between an aerial combo or forcing the opponent to switch to a different character. The "Super Dash" flying attack will home in on the opponent's lead character and is able to pass through weaker projectiles. Lastly, players can "Ki Charge" to manually increase their Ki gauge, similar to previous Dragon Ball fighting games.

The game includes several other features, such as "Shenron System", that allows players to gather the Dragon Balls one by one as the fight progresses. A random Dragon Ball will be given to a player that successfully performs a light autocombo. Specific Dragon Balls can be obtained by successfully performing a multi hit combo, with the amount of hits determining which ball is given. Once all seven are assembled and a player performs a light autocombo with maximum Ki, Shenron appears to grant a wish and allows players to choose one among the following benefits: give the fighter a second Sparking Blast, revive a fallen ally, recover a fighter's health or regenerate health for the rest of the match. Another feature is the "Dramatic Moments", special cutscenes that appear at the start and the end of a fight depending on the characters involved and stage, related to events from the Dragon Ball series, which can be applied after using Standing Hard normal attack or Vanish (as of Season 2) as the finisher/combo ender.

Season 3 allows players to choose three different Assist types before the match. Season 3 also enhanced Sparking Blast properties and extended its time limit further when one of the player's team members is down.

Dragon Ball FighterZ features a ranking system in both its arcade mode as well as in online multiplayer, where players increase their rank with subsequent wins.

== Characters ==
The base roster includes 21 playable characters, with 3 additional characters being unlockable through gameplay and a further 21 being released as paid downloadable content (DLC) via a series of "FighterZ Passes" and two additional playable DLC characters for a total of 45. Android 21 is a new character original to the game, designed by series creator Akira Toriyama.

Base Roster			FighterZ Pass 1	FighterZ Pass 2	FighterZ Pass 3	Additional DLC
Android 16; Android 18 ^{AP}; Android 21 ^{U}; Beerus; Captain Ginyu ^{A}; Cell; Frieza; Gohan (Teen)	Gohan (Adult) ^{P}; Goku (Super Saiyan); Goku (SSGSS) ^{U}; Goku Black ^{A}; Gotenks; Hit; Kid Buu; Krillin	Majin Buu; Nappa ^{A}; Piccolo; Tien ^{A}; Trunks; Vegeta (Super Saiyan); Vegeta (SSGSS) ^{U}; Yamcha	Android 17 ^{P}; Bardock; Broly; Cooler; Goku; Vegeta; Vegito (SSGSS); Zamasu (Fused)	Broly (DBS); Gogeta (SSGSS); Goku (GT); Janemba; Jiren; Videl ^{AP}	Gogeta (SS4); Goku (Ultra Instinct); Kefla; Master Roshi; Super Baby 2	Android 21 (Lab Coat); Goku (SS4/Daima)

^U Unlockable characters
^A Characters that have assist characters
^P Playable characters who are also assist characters for certain playable characters
^AP Playable assist characters, and whose own assist characters are also playable characters

== Plot ==
The game's Story mode takes place sometime between "Universe 6" and "Future Trunks" saga of Dragon Ball Super. The game's main antagonist, Android 21 (or later, her evil-half), was a normal female human who eventually became an Android created by the Red Ribbon Army after her son became the model for Android 16. Once she awakens, she repairs 16 and uses the Dragon Balls to resurrect Frieza, Cell, Nappa, and the Ginyu Force, and seals away the powers and souls of all of Earth's strongest warriors. Wanting to control the hungry monster within her, she and 16 develop a linking system originally created by Dr. Gero in which a human soul (the player) can possess the warriors and provide them strength.

=== Super Warrior Arc ===
The player possesses Goku and awakens next to Bulma, who asks him to confront the Earth's current crisis. Clones of the other fighters and villains have been appearing and the other Z Warriors are nowhere to be seen. After confronting the resurrected 16, Beerus and Whis arrive to explain the soul's link to Goku, but assert to both Goku and Bulma that they are not getting involved since they are deities. Goku and Bulma leave to try and find 16 and the other Z warriors. Goku rescues Krillin, and they battle Cell who appears to have knocked out 18 and endangered an unknown woman. The woman claims to be a Red Ribbon scientist and informs them that they need to find the base emitting the power-suppressing waves to restore their abilities.

The reunited Z Fighters eventually confront 16, where he explains that the Red Ribbon Army's current leader, Android 21, is behind everything. The scientist Goku and Krillin saved from Cell earlier arrives and reveals herself to be Android 21. She destroys 16 for his betrayal and knocks out Goku when he tries to follow her. The player then possesses Cell's body and battles 21 before returning to Goku's body again. 21 devours the resurrected villains and decides to wait for Goku and his friends to grow stronger. Goku brings her and the other Z Fighters to the Sacred World of the Kai to protect Earth from the fight. With their combined power, Goku and the Z Fighters obliterate 21. Whis expresses his disappointment over the unanswered questions about Android 21.

=== Enemy Warrior Arc ===
16 implants the player's soul within the recently revived Freeza, much to the tyrant's ire. Freeza recruits the resurrected Nappa, Ginyu Force, and Cell to battle the clones and eventually confront the true culprit: Android 21. 21 forces the villains to battle and defeat Android 18. Goku and Krillin arrive while she pretends to be an innocent bystander to pit the heroes and villains against each other. The player prevents Freeza from killing Goku and the villains explain the situation to the heroes. Goku suggests that the two sides join forces to stop 21, and the villains reluctantly agree.

The villains aid Goku in rescuing the Z Fighters to fight 21, who destroys 16 after discovering his betrayal. Freeza suggests to the group that they strengthen their link with the player to gain back more of their power and defeat more clones as they're the source of 21's strength. After killing the final clone, they defeat Android 21 and use Bulma's machine to help Goku, Freeza, and Cell obliterate her for good. Following her destruction, everyone's powers are restored and Freeza expels the player from his body as the heroes and villains start fighting each other anew.

=== Android 21 Arc ===
Android 16 kidnaps Android 18 and implants the player's soul within her. He requests 21 and the player's help in combating the clones created by the Red Ribbon Army. 21 becomes increasingly unstable after each battle, but 16 refuses to explain her condition to 17 and 18. When Krillin finds the androids, 21 forces 18 to fight Krillin and nearly kills him, but the player links with 21 and discovers two beings within her body. 16 takes 18 to a lab and explains that the cells that created Android 21 may be going berserk and that he used the link system to stop her from going mad.

The androids are eventually confronted by Cell, who has regained most of his original power. 21 transforms into her temporarily purified Majin form to protect the androids but succumbs to her corrupted half's hunger again. She unintentionally kills 16 while she is struggling with her inner demon, causing her good and evil personas to split into two separate beings. Evil 21 devours Cell and the control to the power suppressor, drastically increasing her strength. Goku and Krillin rescue the androids and recruit them to combat Evil 21. The Z-Fighters battle Evil 21 for the last time on the Sacred World of the Kai. Once the fighters discover Evil 21's extraordinary regenerative capabilities, Goku attacks her with a Spirit Bomb. When Evil 21 starts resisting the attack, Good 21 pushes her into it, killing them both. Goku plans to request 21's reincarnation from King Yemma and to help the player return their original body.

== Development and release ==
Dragon Ball FighterZ is developed by Arc System Works and marks the company's fourth time working on the Dragon Ball IP, after the Dragon Ball Z: Supersonic Warriors games and Dragon Ball Z: Extreme Butōden. The game's producer, Tomoko Hiroki, stated the game was designed as a three-on-three fighting game because " ... it would feel a bit odd to see ... Goku being defeated by Krillin", in reference to the large difference of power between certain characters, which is common in Dragon Ball, and added it would make it easier to implement aspects of the Dragon Ball license into the game with the three-on-three system. When she discovered that western news outlets and fans had persistently compared FighterZ to the Marvel Vs. Capcom series, she stated there was no intention to emulate the Marvel vs. Capcom series with the gameplay system.

=== Concept and design of Android 21 ===
Android 21 in her human form, wearing a labcoat

Android 21 was marketed as an "original character supervised by Akira Toriyama" when the character was first unveiled in promotional and marketing material for FighterZ in September 2017, which inferred that he was involved in her visual direction and conception but not necessarily with the actual character art. The developers sought Toriyama's input as they wanted a slick design for a character that would transform, in the hope that Toriyama's involvement with the game's visuals would generate interest and bring in prospective fans. Toriyama took the suggestions about Android 21 into account and finalized her design, but was not involved in any direct input into her story.

Arc System Works staff indicated in an interview that they wanted to create an original story for Dragon Ball FighterZ because the events of the original series have been retread several times by other licensed video games; the introduction of an original villainous character is intended to add a fresh element to the game's story. Android 21 was concepted to be a Red Ribbon Bio-Android as part of the developer's take on maintaining a connection to the original series' themes while creating something new, and as a female character since the Dragon Ball series have had few female villains throughout its decades-long history, while her ability to shapeshift into an alternate form at will also differentiates her from notable series villain Cell. Her connection to the Red Ribbon Army and its series of Androids created by Doctor Gero was highlighted in media coverage; for example, a trailer showed a cutscene where she assists an injured Android 18, and calls herself a researcher for the Red Ribbon Army. Hiroki indicated that the character is highly intelligent, as emphasized by her lab coat and glasses, possibly more so compared to Doctor Gero. Android 21's ability to transform is derived from a suggestion by Shueisha, the publisher of the Jump magazine line which serializes the Dragon Ball manga.

=== Promotion and release ===
On June 9, 2017, a Japanese press release dated for June 12 prematurely revealed information about the game and two screenshots before its official announcement. The press release was eventually removed from Bandai Namco's website.

On June 11, 2017, the game was revealed at Microsoft's E3 2017 press conference. A closed beta for the Xbox One and PlayStation 4 versions were also confirmed. Bandai Namco said there is a possibility the game could come to the Nintendo Switch if enough fans request it. Dragon Ball creator Akira Toriyama designed a new female character named Android 21 (人造人間21号, Jinzōningen Nijūichi-Gō) for the game. The game uses Unreal Engine 4.

On June 12, 2018, during Nintendo's E3 2018 installment of Nintendo Direct, Nintendo announced that a version of Dragon Ball FighterZ would be released on Nintendo Switch later in 2018, with a playable demo of the Switch version of the game being available for attendees on the show floor, where it was revealed that the game supported a simplified control scheme to accommodate single Joy-Con controller play in single-player and multiplayer modes.

Players who preordered Dragon Ball FighterZ on console received early access to the game's open beta test period, as well as early unlocks for the SSGSS Goku and SSGSS Vegeta characters and an additional in-game stamp pack. Two digital bundles were released alongside the game: The "FighterZ Edition" includes the game and the FighterZ Pass, which includes eight additional downloadable characters. The "Ultimate Edition" includes all content from the FighterZ Edition, as well as a Commentator Voice Pack and additional music from the anime series which can be played during battle. A physical collector's edition for the game was also released, which includes a steel book case, three artboards, and a 7" statue of Goku.

A Nintendo Switch version was released in September 2018. On August 7, 2022, during EVO 2022, Hiroki announced versions of FighterZ for PlayStation 5 and Xbox Series X/S with added rollback netcode, which were released on February 29, 2024, alongside a rollback netcode update for the Windows version. Owners of the PlayStation 4 and Xbox One versions received free upgrades to their next-generation counterparts.

Three years after the release of Android 21 (Lab Coat) in 2022, and a year after Akira Toriyama's passing and the release of his final work on Dragon Ball series, Dragon Ball Daima in 2024, it was announced at EVO France 2025 that FighterZ would be receiving additional balance updates on October 12, 2025, with the Daima version of Super Saiyan 4 Goku added as a playable DLC character in April 22nd, 2026.

== Reception ==
Reception

Aggregate scores
Aggregator	Score
Metacritic	PC: 85/100; PS4: 87/100; XONE: 86/100; NS: 87/100
OpenCritic	94%

Review scores
Publication	Score
Destructoid	8.5/10
Electronic Gaming Monthly	9/10
Famitsu	36/40
Game Informer	9.25/10
GameRevolution	4/5
GameSpot	9/10
GamesRadar+	4/5
Hardcore Gamer	4.5/5
IGN	8.5/10
Nintendo Life	9/10
Nintendo World Report	9/10
PC Gamer (UK)	83%
Polygon	8.5/10
VideoGamer.com	8/10
HobbyConsolas	91%
Slant Magazine	4.5/5
The Games Machine	9/10
Trusted Reviews	4.5/5
3DJuegos	9/10
Area Jugones	8.5/10
Atomix	86/100
Critical Hit	9/10
MeriStation	9.2/10
Vandal	9/10

After its announcement, Dragon Ball FighterZ was met with great enthusiasm from fans of fighting games and the source material alike, with many saying it has the potential to be the next big competitive fighting game. The game gained praise regarding its art design and animation being faithful to the source material, as well as its fighting mechanics. A playable demo was available at the Evolution Championship Series 2017, where pros were able to get their hands on the title for a small tournament; many of the pros praised the game highly, regarding its versatility when it comes to play styles as well as being enjoyable. Android 21 has received particular attention upon her reveal due to her distinctive visual design by Toriyama.

The game received generally favorable reviews from critics, who cited the art style, combat system, cast of playable characters, and story mode as positives. Several called it the best Dragon Ball game, and one of the best fighting games in years. The online connectivity is one of the aspects that was criticized about the game. Mike Fahey found the story mode for Dragon Ball FighterZ to be surprisingly good, and thought highly of Android 21 as a "delightful new character" who eats the warriors she transforms into snack foods.

The second playable version of Android 21 was met with a divisive response from the fighting game community. Some players criticized the character's gameplay as being unbalanced and claimed that the opportunity to play as the character in competitive matches, particularly in serious tournaments, has led to declining interest and investment in FighterZ from high-profile professional players.

The game has been compared to the Marvel vs. Capcom series of team-based fighting games, with news outlets and players believing the game to be better than the most recent game in the series at the time, Marvel vs. Capcom: Infinite.

=== Competitive scene ===
Dragon Ball FighterZ became a prominent title in the fighting game community shortly after its release. At EVO 2018, the game drew 2,530 entrants in its debut year, making it the first game outside the Street Fighter series to have the highest registration count at the tournament. The grand finals between Dominique "SonicFox" McLean and Goichi "GO1" Kishida drew approximately 258,000 concurrent viewers on Twitch, the highest viewership for an EVO main event at the time. SonicFox won the inaugural EVO championship for the game after defeating GO1 in the final set. At EVO 2019, GO1 defeated SonicFox in the grand finals to claim the title.

Bandai Namco Entertainment launched the Dragon Ball FighterZ World Tour in 2018, an official international tournament circuit. Ryota "Kazunoko" Inoue won the inaugural World Tour Finals in January 2019 in Los Angeles. The game continued to be featured on the EVO main stage through subsequent years, and the World Tour ran for six seasons through 2024–2025.

=== Sales ===
The game shipped over two million copies a week after release, becoming the fastest selling Dragon Ball title. It also set a Steam record for the highest number of concurrent users for a fighting game.

It reached second in the sales charts in the UK, Australia, New Zealand and the US, behind Monster Hunter: World in all cases. It also debuted second behind Monster Hunter: World in Japan with 68,731 sales in its first week. By October 2018, the game had shipped over 3.5 million copies worldwide. Throughout 2018, it sold 112,258 physical copies for PS4 in Japan.

Total sales reached over 4 million copies by the end of March 2019. On May 20, 2020, it was revealed that the game had surpassed sales of 5 million copies. By December 2020, the game had sold over 6 million copies worldwide. In November 2021, the game surpassed 8 million copies sold worldwide. As of May 2023 the game has sold 10 million copies.

=== Accolades ===
Year	Award	Category	Result	Ref.
2017	Game Critics Awards	Best Fighting Game	Won	
2017	Game Critics Awards	Best Original Game	Nominated	
2017	Gamescom	Best Booth Award	Nominated	
2018	ESPN Esports Awards	Game of the Year	Won	
2018	Golden Joystick Awards	Best Competitive Game	Nominated	
2018	Golden Joystick Awards	Best Visual Design	Nominated	
2018	Golden Joystick Awards	eSports Game of the Year	Nominated	
2018	The Game Awards	Best Fighting Game	Won	
2018	Gamers' Choice Awards	Fan Favorite Game	Nominated	
2018	Gamers' Choice Awards	Fan Favorite eSports Game	Nominated	
2018	Gamers' Choice Awards	Fan Favorite Fighting Game	Won	
2018	Titanium Awards	Best Fighting Game	Won	
2019	New York Game Awards	Raging Bull Award for Best Fighting Game	Nominated	
2019	D.I.C.E. Awards	Fighting Game of the Year	Nominated	
2019	SXSW Gaming Awards	Excellence in Animation	Nominated	
2019	SXSW Gaming Awards	Excellence in Convergence	Nominated	
2019	SXSW Gaming Awards	Most Promising New eSports Game	Nominated	
2019	Italian Video Game Awards	People's Choice	Nominated	
