= Dragon Ball Z: The Legacy of Goku (video game) =

- Cover art
- Developer: Webfoot Technologies
- Publishers: NA: Infogrames; EU: Infogrames Europe
- Director: Dana Dominiak
- Writer: Israel Smith
- Composer: Ariel Gross
- Platform: Game Boy Advance
- Release: NA: May 14, 2002; EU: October 4, 2002
- Genre: Action role-playing

Dragon Ball Z: The Legacy of Goku is an action role-playing video game for the Game Boy Advance, based on the anime series Dragon Ball Z and part of the Dragon Ball video game series, developed by Webfoot Technologies and released in 2002. The first part of the trilogy of the same name, it was released in North America on May 14, 2002 and in Europe on October 4, 2002, and was published by Infogrames. In the game, the player, as the protagonist Goku, faces various missions and fights along the plot of the first three seasons of the series, up to the Frieza Saga.

== Gameplay ==
The player, as Goku, spends most of the game exploring areas where he must complete missions assigned to him by the characters he encounters. Most missions cause Goku to gain experience points or advance to the next area.

Combat is the main focus of the game. The player can press the 'A' button to use physical strikes, while the 'B' button unleashes a variety of energy-based attacks. Energy attacks drain an energy gauge, though it gradually recharges when not in use. Energy attacks can be cycled through with the 'L' button, and more energy attacks are learned as the player progresses.

Goku's health is restored via two types of objects, herbs and senzu, both found in the playing area. He also has the ability to fly for a limited time, determined by the number of flight charges he possesses. Additional charges can also be collected.

== Plot ==
The game covers the story of Dragon Ball Z up until the destruction of the planet Namek, where Goku is the only playable character. Goku travels through different stages, including several locations of the earth and planet Namek, and gains experience not only by defeating enemies, but also by completing simple missions. In the final stage, Goku transforms into a Super Saiyan in order to defeat Frieza, this being the first introduction to character transformations in the series, which will later be very common in the following games. It is also one of the first GBA games to feature full-motion video, predating the Game Boy Advance Video.

== Reception ==
The Legacy of Goku

Aggregate score
Aggregator	Score
Metacritic	53/100

Review scores
Publication	Score
Electronic Gaming Monthly	5.83/10
Game Informer	7.5/10
GamePro	3/5
GameSpot	5.4/10
GameSpy	3/5
GameZone	6.7/10
IGN	5.8/10
Nintendo Power	2.7/5
X-Play	1/5

In the United States, the game sold 1.2 million copies and earned $35 million by August 2006. During the time between May 2002 and August 2006, it was the 11th highest-selling game for the Game Boy Advance in that country. As of 2017, the game has sold 1.4 million copies in the United States.

The Legacy of Goku received "mixed" reviews according to the review aggregation website Metacritic.

== Sequel ==
The commercial success of the game in North America led to it becoming the first part of a trilogy. The sequel, Dragon Ball Z: The Legacy of Goku II, released on June 17, 2003, had a better reception from critics, but fewer sales. The third game, Dragon Ball Z: Buu's Fury, had a more mediocre reception. It was released on September 14, 2004, only in North America.

== Bibliography ==
- Hollinger, Elizabeth M. (2002). Dragon Ball Z: Legacy of Goku (Prima's Official Strategy Guide). Prima Games. ISBN 0761539948 – via Internet Archive.
