= Dragon Ball Z: Taiketsu =

2003 video game

- North American cover art
- Developer: Webfoot Technologies
- Publishers: NA: Atari; EU: Bandai
- Producer: Dana Dominiak
- Programmer: Patrick Alphonso
- Artist: Gerry Swanson
- Composer: Yannis Brown
- Platform: Game Boy Advance
- Release: NA: November 24, 2003; EU: March 2004
- Genre: Fighting
- Modes: Single-player, multiplayer

Dragon Ball Z: Taiketsu (ドラゴンボールZ 対決, Doragon Bōru Zetto Taiketsu) is a fighting game developed by Webfoot Technologies and published by Atari. Based on the Dragon Ball Z anime series, it was released for the Game Boy Advance (GBA) in North America in 2003 and Europe in 2004.

== Gameplay ==
Dragon Ball Z: Taiketsu is a fighting game that includes 15 characters, including Goku and Broly. Some can be selected by default to play with instantly while others can only be unlocked by winning fights. The selection of the roster represents a mix of villains and heroes throughout the history of Dragon Ball Z. Each character has his or her own arsenal of attacks (a projectile and three special attacks), and the power to transform into a more powerful form. All special attacks require a certain part of the super meter, which fills up while standing still and holding down buttons to charge up some energy. Fights are typically ground-based, though the players can take part in an optional "Sky Battle". The fighter on the ground can either accept the challenge or wait around few seconds for the challenger to return.

The game consists of two game modes: One Player and Multiplayer, where One Player consists of events like endurance, sparring, time challenge and tournament and the Multiplayer allows linking with another GBA user. There is also a "Z-Store" where the earned in-game currency can be used to unlock music, images, and bonus modes and settings.

== Development and release ==
Dragon Ball Z: Taiketsu was developed by American studio Webfoot Technologies. By the early 2000s, the Dragon Ball Z anime series had been enjoying immense global popularity, particularly in the US. According to Webfoot president Dana Dominiak, the developer was instrumental in helping publisher Atari acquire the license for Dragon Ball games from English language distributor Funimation by submitting proposals and tech demos. Webfoot was first responsible for the successful The Legacy of Goku duology of action role-playing games on the GBA. When Atari requested a fighting game adaptation for the handheld, Webfoot provided the initial concept for Taiketsu and development began in late 2002.

The lead programmer and designer was Patrick Alphonso who had worked on a slew of games for PC and home consoles the previous decade including the Sega Genesis port of Mortal Kombat 3. Dominiak, who was the producer on Taiketsu, said that while the team took small bits of inspiration from previous Dragon Ball Z fighting games, Taiketsu was built "from the ground up" and was specifically tailored for US fans "clamoring for an intense, 2-D, Street Fighter-style game featuring all their favorite characters." Staff studied slowed footage of character movements from the show and made the models large all in attempt to make them accurate and recognizable. Its roster was chosen based on character uniqueness and their popularity among fans. Dominiak described Broly as "by far the most popular of all the movie characters". Although Broly did appear in the Japan-exclusive Super Butōden 2, his inclusion in Taiketsu was the latter game's selling point.

Taiketsu was first unveiled at the Electronic Entertainment Expo in May 2003 and was formally announced by Atari the following month. It was originally intended to have connectivity with a future GameCube title for unlockables. However, Dominiak said that this feature was deemed infeasible due release dates not lining up. Atari also advertised a multiplayer mode with four on-screen fighters, consisting of two human players and two computer AI opponents. The game was released in North America on November 24, 2003 and in Europe the week of March 26, 2004. Distribution was handled by Bandai in the latter region. Taiketsu saw a limited bundle release in North America alongside the GBA game Yu Yu Hakusho: Spirit Detective. The bundle included a bonus DVD with clips from both the Dragon Ball Z and YuYu Hakusho anime series.

== Reception ==
Reception

Aggregate scores
| Aggregator | Score |
|---|---|
| GameRankings | 37.4% |
| Metacritic | 40/100 |

Review scores
| Publication | Score |
|---|---|
| Computer and Video Games | 34/100 |
| Electronic Gaming Monthly | 13/30 |
| Game Informer | 6/10 |
| GamePro | 2.5/5 |
| GameSpot | 2.7/10 |
| GameSpy | 1/5 |
| GameZone | 4/10 |
| HobbyConsolas | 67/100 |
| Hyper | 40/100 |
| IGN | 4/10 |
| Jeuxvideo.com | 4/20 |
| Nintendo Power | 2.3/5 |
| Nintendo World Report | 3.5/10 |
| Official Nintendo Magazine | 41% |
| Joypad | 2/10 |
| MAN!AC | 38% |

Upon its release, Dragon Ball Z: Taiketsu was met with "generally unfavorable" reviews from critics, with an aggregate score of 40% on Metacritic. HobbyConsolas included it as one of the worst video games based on an anime, criticizing the characters art direction. Screen Rant observed that the game felt "unpolished", while giving signs that "no real effort or care went into its creation".

Publisher Arari reported that Taiketsu was its sixth best-selling product for the fiscal year ending March 31, 2004. According to Next Generation, the game sold approximately 620,000 copies in the United States, earning $14 million by August 2006. During the period between January 2000 and August 2006, it was the 45th highest-selling game launched for the GBA, Nintendo DS or PlayStation Portable in that country.
