= Dragon Ball Z: Attack of the Saiyans =

2009 video game

- NA/EU Box art for the game
- Developer: Monolith Soft
- Publisher: Namco Bandai Games (Note: Released under the Bandai brand name outside North America)
- Director: Koji Hayashi
- Producer: Yasuyuki Honne
- Composer: Tsukasa Masuko
- Series: Dragon Ball
- Platform: Nintendo DS
- Release: JP: April 29, 2009; EU: November 6, 2009; NA: November 10, 2009; AU: November 19, 2009
- Genre: Role-playing
- Mode: Single-player

Dragon Ball Z: Attack of the Saiyans, known in Japan as Dragon Ball Kai: Saiyan Invasion, (Note: Dragon Ball Kai: Saiya-jin Raishū (ドラゴンボール改 サイヤ人来襲, Doragon Bōru Kai Saiyajin Raishū)) is a 2009 role-playing video game developed by Monolith Soft and published by Namco Bandai Games for the Nintendo DS. It was released in Japan on April 29, 2009, and in Europe and North America in November 2009. It is based on the Dragon Ball franchise. It is one of the first games in the Dragon Ball franchise to be published in North America by Namco Bandai, as the company would acquire the license from previous holder Atari in July of the same year. The game covers events from the "23rd Tenkaichi Budokai" story arc through the end of the eponymous "Saiyan" arc of the original manga.

Attack of the Saiyans received generally mixed reviews by gaming critics, while complimenting the battle system, its visuals, and its aptness in staying faithful to the original series. It would go on to be the third-best selling video game of May 2009 in Japan.

== Gameplay ==
Exploring one of many areas within the game. The top screen features the party leader. The long meter represents the players ki needed to clear obstacles. The touch screen features the player's available Dyno-Caps that can be used.

Presented in traditional 2-D animation sprites, the game consists of three modes to help navigate, the map of the Dragon World, the area maps, and the battle mode. The world map will be available from the start, and will allow players easy access to each of the areas throughout the game. On area maps the player will navigate through various places such fields, forests, caves, and towns on the top screen. The touch screen will display available equipment that can be used while in fields. These items are available courtesy of Capsule Corporation Dyno-Caps which can be bought, given, or found in various spots and or treasure chests. Many of these areas have obstacles such as rocks and brush which the player will have to overcome with ki blasts. However, some of these obstacles require stronger levels of ki blasts. The battle screen will take place at the screen with the party facing off with a monster or a boss, their stats and the command select icon presented via the touch screen. The game makes little to no use of the stylus, forcing players to rely on the control pad.

An in game battle. The top screen displays the battle while the touch screen displays character vitals, Rage Gage, and the select command icons.

In combat, the player's active party members will consist of only first three members of their party or less. Players can swap available members at any time throughout the game. Each character will have a few set attacks and techniques at the player's disposal while the rest are locked. When the player wins a battle, each member of their party will earn Ability Points or AP. Ability Points can be used to buy or upgrade skills in a character's skill menu. When certain skills are unlocked or upgraded new skills will become available. Each character will have a "Rage Gage". This meter will gradually fill throughout the course of combat. When a character's gauge is full, they can perform an ultimate attack. If two or more characters gauges are full, the player can execute a Sparking Combo. By which the chosen characters will perform a tag team attack. When an ultimate attack or a Sparking Combo is performed the gauge returns to zero. Players also have the ability to block enemy attacks with the Active Guard or A Guard. This allows a chosen character to only take minimal damage when their corresponding button is pressed at the moment before an attack.

== Development ==
The game was first announced in the December 22, 2008, issue of Weekly Shonen Jump magazine with the title Dragon Ball Z Story: Saiyan Invasion (ドラゴンボールZストーリー サイヤ人来襲, Doragon Bōru Zetto Sutōrī Saiyajin Raishū). The article stated that the game would be a role-playing game in development by Monolith Soft exclusively for the DS, it would take start at the 23rd Tenkaichi Budokai saga and extend into the Saiyan saga, and it would be released sometime in 2009. Several screenshots were shown in the article. One of which depicted different looking graphics command icons. It was also revealed that only six of the main characters Goku, Gohan, Piccolo, Krillin, Tien, and Yamcha, would be playable. In the February issue of V Jump, it was announced that the title had been changed to tie-in with Dragon Ball Kai, a revised version of the anime series Dragon Ball Z, which would later premiere in April of the same year. The game was one in numerous collaborations between Monolith Soft and Namco Bandai Games after the latter sold the former to Nintendo in 2007.

On May 25, Namco Bandai's European branch released a press statement announcing that they would be releasing the game throughout Europe and the PAL regions under the new name Dragon Ball Z: Attack of the Saiyans. On June 2, Namco Bandai's American branch issued a press release stating that they would release the game as Attack of the Saiyans throughout North America. The announcement also mentioned that the game would include numerous alternate storylines for a better understanding of the Dragon Ball universe, a three character party and combo attack system, that certain ki attacks would be needed to solve puzzles or unlock secrets, and that their release date would be sometime in the Fall of 2009. Following that statement, the company issued another press release stating that they had acquired the North American license from previous license holder Atari, and would publish future Dragon Ball games for, at least, the next five years starting with Attack of the Saiyans, Raging Blast, and Revenge of King Piccolo. In November, Namco Bandai issued a press release stating that the game was available throughout all North American markets.

== Reception ==
Reception

Aggregate score
Aggregator	Score
Metacritic	73/100

Review scores
Publication	Score
1Up.com	C+
Famitsu	29/40
GamesMaster	70%
GamesRadar+	3.5/5
GameZone	7/10
IGN	7.1/10
Nintendo Power	8/10
Nintendo World Report	7.5/10
3DJuegos	7.6/10
Vandal	7.2/10

Attack of the Saiyans was released in Japan on April 29, 2009, in Australia on November 19, 2009, in Europe on November 6, 2009, and in North America on November 10, 2009. Following its release, the game would go on to become the third best-selling video game in Japan during the month of May 2009, falling behind two other DS games Kingdom Hearts 358/2 Days and Ace Attorney Investigations: Miles Edgeworth.

The game received "average" reviews according to the review aggregation website Metacritic. In Japan, Famitsu gave it a score of one six, one seven, and two eights, for a total of 29 out of 40.

Charles Onyett of IGN found the gameplay enjoyable and enough to be appreciated by any genre fan. Yet he stated that if players were not Dragon Ball fans, then they will not want to play the game. Robert Thompson of Nintendojo felt that the game would satisfy fans of both the series and the genre, but he would complain about the ki and Sparking Combo attacks being repetitive, and the story shifting control of the characters, stating it could make unfamiliar gamers disoriented. Ryan Olsen of Kombo.com praised the battle system, calling it more engaging than the ones found in the average RPG. Still he would call the game a cut and dried RPG, calling the Active Guard system the only exotic aspect of the game. Neal Ronaghan of Nintendo World Report called the game vanilla with an interesting twists, stating that the fans should be the ones playing the game. He also drew comparisons of the Active Guard system to the Timed Hit system from Super Mario RPG, and Rage Gage to the Limit Break from Final Fantasy. Brittany Vincent of RPGFan would call side quests like Krillin's return home an added treat to the long story. She pointed out the game's difficulty being frustrating, stating that the game will cause players to revert to the start screen many times, yet is still beatable.

Joe Law of GameFocus criticized the Rage Gage system, stating that it had been done better in other games. However he cited the game's overall length a good thing as he felt the game had no replay value. Nick Valentino of GameZone praised the game, calling it the best RPG to make use of the Dragon Ball label, and the game was the perfect introduction into the franchise. Mike Moehnke of RPGamer cited the games as not being perfect, but was superior to the Super Famicom game Legend of the Super Saiyan. Kat Bailey of 1UP.com felt the game was made with children in mind, stating that the vibrant colors and the fast-paced gameplay would keep kids interested in the game.
