= Dragon Ball Z: Supersonic Warriors =

2004 video game

- The European cover art of the first Supersonic Warriors game for Game Boy Advance.
- Developers: Cavia; Arc System Works
- Publishers: JP: Banpresto; NA: Atari; EU: Bandai
- Directors: Junya Motomura (SSW); Masaaki Miyata (SSW2)
- Producer: Hideshi Tatsuno (SSW)
- Composer: Studio PJ
- Series: Dragon Ball
- Platforms: Game Boy Advance; Nintendo DS
- Release: Supersonic Warriors: JP: March 26, 2004; NA: June 22, 2004; EU: August 27, 2004; Supersonic Warriors 2: NA: November 17, 2005; JP: December 1, 2005; AU: December 8, 2005; EU: February 3, 2006
- Genre: Fighting video game
- Modes: Single-player; Multiplayer

Dragon Ball Z: Supersonic Warriors (ドラゴンボールZ 舞空闘劇, Doragon Bōru Z Bukū Tôgeki) is a series of fighting games based on the Dragon Ball franchise. The first game was developed by Arc System Works and Cavia and was released for the Game Boy Advance on June 22, 2004. A sequel, Supersonic Warriors 2, was released in 2005 for the Nintendo DS.

== Gameplay ==
Supersonic Warriors pits either two players or two teams composed of up to three characters from the Dragon Ball franchise against each other in large environments. The player can use strong and weak variations of close combat attacks, and charge their ki to fire strong and weak energy blasts. Each character also has three unique "Certain Kill" abilities that deal heavy damage to the opponent. The Certain Kill ability varies depending on where the player is located – above, below or horizontal to the opponent.

== Games ==
=== Supersonic Warriors ===
Dragon Ball Z: Supersonic Warriors (ドラゴンボールZ 舞空闘劇, Doragon Bōru Z Bukū Tôgeki) is the first game in the Supersonic Warriors series and the ninth Dragon Ball game released for Nintendo handheld devices overall (preceded by Dragon Ball Z: Taiketsu and followed by Dragon Ball Z: Buu's Fury. It was developed by Arc System Works and Cavia for Banpresto and released for the Game Boy Advance on June 22, 2004. The game offers a variety of modes that the player can choose from, and when completed, can earn points to unlock various characters and missions.

Playable characters

Heroes	Villains
Goku (Base; Super Saiyan); Gohan (Super Saiyan 2 (Teen); Ultimate Gohan); Piccolo; Krillin; Vegeta (Base; Super Saiyan; Majin Vegeta); Future Trunks (Super Saiyan); Gotenks (Super Saiyan 3)	Captain Ginyu; Frieza (Final Form; Cyborg Frieza); Doctor Gero; Android 18; Cell (Perfect); Majin Buu (Fat Buu; Super Buu)

Story Mode

In this game mode, the player selects one of sixteen different stories to follow a core narrative – there are three Z-Stories which roughly follow the canon of the DBZ Manga and Anime across the Namek, Android and Majin Sagas from numerous characters, and thirteen Character Stories for each of the thirteen playable characters, many of which show alternate 'What If' outcomes to the DBZ story. In each story the player fights through a series of six to eight opponents, which follow the original Dragon Ball Z anime storyline in the chosen characters' perspective. The story mode is presented through short scenes; where long texts associated with pictures and scenery are involved. Once a scene is done, the player must fight an opponent, continue with the scene, and fight again against computer AI, where the next opponent is slightly more difficult than the previous. As the storyline progresses, the character gains new abilities that enhance the players' gameplay experience, allowing for more strategic battle combinations. Once the story is completed, the player will gain points that they can spend in the options mode to unlock new characters in order to engage in the storyline from another characters perspective, battling different opponents. If the player is able to defeat all opponents without dying once in a story, a certain number of stories give players a bonus fight, extending the storyline as a special reward.

Challenge Mode

The player selects three characters to form a team and must battle against pre-set enemy teams that are generated by the computer AI. Character selection cannot exceed level four, and in order to defeat the enemy team, the player must fully utilize their three chosen characters' abilities. Only after defeating the first enemy team, the player can unlock new teams to fight against until the mode is completed. Defeating the challenge mode grants the greatest number of points that can be spent in the options menu, allowing for a wider variety of character combinations for teams.

Z Battle Mode

In Z battle mode the player chooses a character, and must battle against 8 enemies, however after completing a round of Z battle mode, the chosen character is given a ranking. As the player defeats more opponents with a single character, the ranking of that character will increase and various statistics are given, allowing players to continuously build on various characters to complete their full ranking. All rankings and statistics are viewed in the options mode under the rankings tab.

Free Battle Mode

Free battle mode unchains all restrictions that are placed from the other modes, allowing for a free range of battles for any combination of enemies. The player can choose from any character that is available or unlocked, and there are no limits to the levels corresponding to the characters. The mode engages in either a 1on1 or team style of fighting, where the player can choose their own enemies to fight or a random enemy through the random generator.

Link Vs. Mode

Within this game mode, the player leaves the domain of computer AI battles in order to battle against another human player. This game mode can offer a range of battle combinations, movement, and reactions that cannot be executed by the computer AI enemies. Two Game Boy Advances, a link cable are required to play in this mode in order to connect the two players together.

=== Supersonic Warriors 2 ===
Dragon Ball Z: Supersonic Warriors 2 (ドラゴンボールZ 舞空烈戦, Doragon Bōru Z Bukū Ressen) is the second and final game in the series. It was published by Atari and released in 2005 for the Nintendo DS. Featuring an expanded roster, the game saw the return of all thirteen characters from the first game alongside two new additional characters from the Dragon Ball Z movies – Cooler and Broly. It also saw a selection of support characters which could be unlocked to provide assistance in battle via special moves or a revival option. The returning Story Mode introduced a branching path system where battles would be unlocked if certain conditions are met. These alternate outcomes would lead to special "What If" storylines.

Playable characters

Playable Characters (Heroes)	Playable Characters (Villains)	Support Characters (Heroes)	Support Characters (Villains)
Goku (Base, Kaio-ken, Super Saiyan); Vegeta (Base, Super Saiyan, Majin); Gohan (Teen) (Base, Super Saiyan, Super Saiyan 2); Gohan (Adult) (Base, Super Saiyan, Ultimate); Future Trunks (Base, Super Saiyan, Super Saiyan 1.5); Gotenks (Base, Super Saiyan, Super Saiyan 3); Piccolo; Krillin (Base, Unlocked Potential); Android 18; Majin Buu	Captain Ginyu; Frieza (Final Form); Mecha Frieza; Dr. Gero; Semi-Perfect Cell; Perfect Cell; Super Buu; Cooler (4th Form); Metal-Cooler; Broly (Legendary Super Saiyan)	Yamcha/Tien Shinhan (Wolf Fang Fist/Tri-Beam); Bardock (Charges Ki to full 200%); Android 17/Android 16 (Android Barrier/Barrage of Ki Blasts); Dende (Healing Ability); Shenron (Revives fallen character); Mr. Satan (Throws volley of grenades); Neko Majin Z (Japanese version only)	Zarbon/Dodoria (Barrage of Rapid Ki Blasts/Barrage of Heavy Ki Blasts); Dabura (Throws volley of spears); Cell Jr. (Repeatedly dashes and tackles); Babidi (Reverses enemy's controls via magic/causes Vegeta to become Majin Vegeta)

== Reception ==
=== Supersonic Warriors ===
Supersonic Warriors

Aggregate scores
Aggregator	Score
GameRankings	73.47%
Metacritic	73/100

Review scores
Publication	Score
Famitsu	29/40
Game Informer	5.5/10
GamePro	3.5/5
GameSpot	7.7/10
GameSpy	3/5
GameZone	7.5/10
IGN	7.5/10
NGC Magazine	59%
Nintendo Power	3.1/5
Nintendo World Report	8/10
The Sydney Morning Herald	3.5/5
The Times	4/5

Supersonic Warriors was met with average reception upon release, as GameRankings gave it a score of 73%, while Metacritic gave it 73 out of 100.

=== Supersonic Warriors 2 ===
Supersonic Warriors 2

Aggregate scores
Aggregator	Score
GameRankings	69.59%
Metacritic	66/100

Review scores
Publication	Score
GamePro	3.5/5
GameSpot	6.9/10
GameSpy	3.5/5
GameZone	7/10
IGN	7.5/10
NGC Magazine	68%
Nintendo Power	5/10

Supersonic Warriors 2 was met with a little more mixed reception than the first game; GameRankings gave it a score of 70%, while Metacritic gave it 66 out of 100.
