= Dragon Ball Z: Buu's Fury =

- North American Box Art
- Developer: Webfoot Technologies
- Publisher: Atari
- Platform: Game Boy Advance
- Release: NA: September 14, 2004
- Genre: Action-adventure
- Modes: Single-player, multiplayer

Dragon Ball Z: Buu's Fury is a 2004 action role-playing video game based on the anime Dragon Ball Z, developed by Webfoot Technologies and published by Atari. It is the sequel to Dragon Ball Z: The Legacy of Goku II, and the third game in the Dragon Ball Z: The Legacy of Goku series. It was released on September 14, 2004 in North America.

Buu's Fury was re-released in 2006 as part of a Game Boy Advance two-pack, which includes Dragon Ball GT: Transformation on the same cartridge.

== Gameplay ==
The fusion Gotenks fighting two enemies.

The charged melee attack was removed, while other features were added. The A button is used for melee attacks, B for energy blasts, L to switch energy blasts, and R to block. The B and R buttons together are used to energy block. The Select button is used to view the Scouter, where the player can view a map of the area and learn information about nearby people, and Start displays the pause menu.

The game added equipment, which could be equipped to characters to alter their stats and provide various other benefits. For example, Ton Armbands and Ton Boots can be equipped to decrease speed, but raise the rate of experience gained when fighting. The game also allows the player to allocate their own stat points, of which three were given per level, to increase their strength, power, and endurance. The player can also use food items they gain from a Z-Mart or enemies, and equip items they buy and discover.

Alongside transformations from the previous game, with Super Saiyan 3 being added, Buu's Fury also implemented a Fusion concept that allows certain characters to combine with each other, boosting their stats and changing their appearance. The three available fusion characters are Gotenks, Gogeta, and a one-time playable Vegito. All three games feature non-canon characters and events from filler arcs, The History of Trunks, Broly - Second Coming, and Dragon Ball Z: Fusion Reborn.

== Story ==
The game focuses on the final parts of the Dragon Ball Z series (season 7), namely the battles with Majin Buu. The first chapter takes place during episode 195 to episode 199, while the rest of the game takes place during episode 200 (after a seven-year flash-forward) and the following episodes.

Like The Legacy of Goku II, the music is also based on Bruce Faulconer's score for the FUNimation English dub of Dragon Ball Z.

== Reception ==
Buu's Fury

Aggregate score
| Aggregator | Score |
|---|---|
| Metacritic | 62/100 |

Review scores
| Publication | Score |
|---|---|
| Game Informer | 4.5/10 |
| GamePro | 3/5 |
| GameSpot | 6.3/10 |
| GameZone | 7/10 |
| IGN | 6.5/10 |
| Nintendo Power | 3.6/5 |
| PALGN | 6.5/10 |

Metacritic categorized Buu's Fury as receiving "mixed or average" reviews.
