= Dragon Ball GT: Transformation =

2005 video game

- Dragon Ball GT: Transformation cover art featuring Super Saiyan 4 Goku, Baby, and Hyper Meta-Rilldo
- Developer: Webfoot Technologies
- Publisher: Atari
- Programmer: Cliff Davies
- Artists: Jim Grant; Andrew Myers; Gerry Swanson
- Writer: Gerry Swanson
- Composer: Yannis Brown
- Series: Dragon Ball
- Platform: Game Boy Advance
- Release: NA: August 9, 2005
- Genre: Beat 'em up
- Modes: Single-player, multiplayer

Dragon Ball GT: Transformation is a side-scroller beat 'em up video game developed by Webfoot Technologies and published by Atari for the Game Boy Advance in North America. The story takes place during the "Black Star Dragon Balls" and "Baby" story arcs of the Dragon Ball GT anime series.

Transformation was originally announced as the first of two Dragon Ball GT games from the developer with its sequel set to cover the remainder of the anime series and to be released at the end of 2005. The tentatively titled Dragon Ball GT: Transformation 2 was then pushed to January 2006. However, it was quietly cancelled. A bundle pack including the first Transformation and Dragon Ball Z: Buu's Fury was released in March 2006.

== Gameplay ==
The gameplay is based on the standard classic beat 'em up subgenre of fighting games, similar to games such as Sega's Streets of Rage series, or Konami's Teenage Mutant Ninja Turtles games. The game takes place over twelve levels, each of which culminates in a boss fight. The game sports multiple gameplay modes, but the story mode is the only one available from the beginning. The other modes must be unlocked by the player by purchasing them with acquired zeni, which is rewarded to the player at the end of each stage, based on their performance. The player's total points are converted into zeni, and bonuses are rewarded based on multiple factors such as time, combos, and power-ups obtained.

== Reception ==
Reception

Aggregate scores
Aggregator	Score
GameRankings	67.92%
Metacritic	69/100

Review scores
Publication	Score
1Up.com	B−
GameSpot	7.6/10
GameZone	7.2/10
Nintendo Power	5.5/10
PALGN	5.5/10
X-Play	2/5
Super GamePower	6.5/10

Dragon Ball GT: Transformation was met with average to mixed reception upon release, as GameRankings gave it a score of 68%, while Metacritic gave it 69 out of 100.
