= Yannis Brown =

Australian composer

Yannis Brown is an Australian composer and sound designer for portable devices and consoles.

He grew up in Adelaide, Australia. He began playing keyboards by ear at the age of 4 and started composing music around the age of 13. He then moved on to writing MOD tracker formats on the Amiga since 1989 and later on the IBM PC around 1993. He was heavily involved with the music part of the Demoscene and ran Groovy Compo, a bi-weekly tracker based internet competition first started by Mick Rippon. He also entered other similar competitions, including The Trackering.

Brown has since joined the game industry as a composer and sound designer and has written music for several handheld platforms including: Nintendo DS, Game Boy Advance, PlayStation Portable, Palm OS, Pocket PC, Tapwave Zodiac and mobile phones such as the Nokia N-Gage, iOS and Android; notably, in 1999, he wrote the soundtrack for South Park Rally and fcomposedand portiedthe score from Dragon Ball Z to Legacy Of Goku 2 and Buu's Fury for Game Boy Advance. He also helped produce audio for many top Web & iOS titles from developers such as NGMoco, PlayFish Games, PopCap Games and AnkiDrive.

His career in the games industry has also included working in-house for multiple companies, such as Ratbag Games aka Midway Games Australia, Backbone Entertainment on Gauntlet DS, Death Jr 2 - Root of Evil and Trion Worlds - most notably RIFT & Trove.

He has links with Astraware and has written music for several of their handheld games including: Toucan Tango, Candy Train, Crazy Daisy, Rocket Mania, Super Bounce Out, Cubis, Mazera and Bejeweled.

Yannis also composed tracks for Warblade.

Yannis worked on the virtual reality adaptation of The Wolves in the Walls, which won a 2022 Peabody Award in the Immersive & Interactive category.
