= Mazera =

2004 video game

- Developer(s): Cold River Studios
- Publisher(s): Astraware
- Designer(s): Justin Avram Clark
- Platform(s): Palm OS, Pocket PC
- Release: 2004
- Genre(s): Puzzle, adventure
- Mode(s): Single-player

Mazera is an adventure game created by Cold River Studios and published by Astraware for Palm OS and Pocket PC. The player plays Ix, who as a boy was captured by an alien race called the Mazerians and imprisoned in their zoo, until one day something happens that gives him a chance to escape. As Ix makes his escape, he must solve a large variety of puzzles and challenges so that he can return to his home planet Ixus.

== Gameplay ==
Mazera is essentially a puzzle-solving game, with elements of adventure games and even bit of action games mixed in, sporting a large variety of challenges ranging from Sokoban-style puzzles to memory games (such as a variation on Concentration) to rudimentary Chess to a humorous take on Pong. Each puzzle or challenge appears in its own "room" or area, which are integrated into a larger game world. These areas are often revisited later in the game, thus adding the element of adventure and exploration to the puzzles. If Ix is killed while trying to solve a particular puzzle or challenge, the puzzle is reset and the player is given the chance to retry. The player may also voluntarily restart the room if it reaches an unsolvable state. There are no penalties for failure and no limits to retries, thus making the game primarily one of puzzle-solving.

The game controls are straightforward, and control Ix's movement. Actions are performed by touching the object in question (for example, touching an NPC to initiate conversation). There is also a function for viewing a map of the current game area.

The game does not come with any extensive documentation; the player learns how to interact with the game world as he progresses through it. In some areas, part of the challenge is to figure out what exactly is the puzzle Ix must solve.

== The world of Mazera ==
At the beginning of the game, Ix breaks out of his imprisonment in the Mazerian zoo and finds himself in the Mazerian city, filled with lush gardens and odd denizens such as laser-toting Mazerians, crabs, giant worms, and the Uthi, another alien race on the planet who are opposed to the Mazerians and often willing to lend Ix a helping hand. Later on, Ix must travel to other parts of the alien planet and encounter many interesting and often humorous denizens and situations.

There are also a number of secrets, some very well hidden, sprinkled throughout the adventure that, if all discovered, opens the way to a bonus level. The bonus level appears to be a testing ground for the game developers, and contains a number humorous references to such real-world things such as the Spirit rover and John Carmack, a renowned game programmer.
