= Broly =

Fictional character from Dragon Ball

- Dragon Ball character
- Broly in his base form (left) and Full Power Wrathful Super Saiyan form (right) in Dragon Ball Super: Broly (2018)
- First appearance: Z version: Dragon Ball Z: Broly – The Legendary Super Saiyan (1993); Super version: Dragon Ball Super: Broly (2018)
- Last appearance: Z version: Dragon Ball Z: Bio-Broly (1994); Super version: Dragon Ball Super: Super Hero (2022)
- Created by: Takao Koyama
- Designed by: Akira Toriyama
- Voiced by: Japanese: Bin Shimada; English: Vic Mignogna (Funimation, 2003–2019); Johnny Yong Bosch (Funimation, 2019–present); Doug Rand (AB Groupe)

In-universe information
- Alias: The Legendary Super Saiyan
- Species: Saiyan
- Family: Paragus (father)

Broly (Japanese: ブロリー, Hepburn: Burorī) is a character from the Dragon Ball media franchise, the son of Paragus who is the unstoppable Legendary Super Saiyan, born the same day as Goku.

Two different versions of the character exist: the original Broly, a non-canon major villain created by screenwriter Takao Koyama who appeared in a trilogy of 1990s Dragon Ball Z films, Broly – The Legendary Super Saiyan (1993), Broly – Second Coming (1994) and Bio-Broly (1994), followed by a canonical, newer and reworked version of the character by series creator Akira Toriyama that debuted in the film Dragon Ball Super: Broly (2018), where he initially served as one of the main antagonists, before eventually becoming a supporting character in his later appearances.

== Creation and design ==
The character of Broly was created by Takao Koyama, who was inspired to create a menacing and powerful Saiyan villain after watching Future Trunks transforming into his Super Saiyan Third Grade form during the Perfect Cell Saga, and designed by Dragon Ball creator, Akira Toriyama. Following the Saiyan race's usual naming trend, which is based on vegetables, Broly's name is a pun on broccoli, while his father Paragus is a pun on asparagus. Besides flashback scenes of Broly as an infant in the 1990s movies as well as Toriyama's design sheets of that version of the character, neither the original nor the reworked version of Broly is seen with a tail, which is considered to be a defining characteristic of a Saiyan character within the series.

=== Voice actors ===
Broly voice actors
Language	Actor	Notes	Ref.
(Adult) Broly
Japanese	Bin Shimada		
English	Vic Mignogna	Funimation dubs of all media until 2019	
English	Johnny Yong Bosch	Funimation dubs 2019–present	
English	Douglas Rand	AB Groupe dub of Broly – The Legendary Super Saiyan	
Young Broly
Japanese	Hiroko Emori	Broly – The Legendary Super Saiyan	
Japanese	Yukiko Morishita	Super	
English	Cynthia Cranz	Broly – The Legendary Super Saiyan	
English	Brina Palencia	Super	
English	Jodi Forrest; Douglas Rand	AB Groupe dub of Broly – The Legendary Super Saiyan	

== Powers and abilities ==
Like other Saiyans in the series, his heritage has given him superhuman strength, senses, durability, agility, speed, reflexes, and the ability to utilize his Ki. In the Daizenshuu 6: Movies & TV (1995) guidebook, it is stated that Super Saiyan Broly's power surpasses that of Super Saiyan Goku and that in his "Legendary Super Saiyan" form Broly is an opponent with infinite power. According to Takao Koyama in a 2006 interview, Broly is the strongest and most powerful antagonist in the Dragon Ball Z series. In Dragon Ball Super: Broly, it is said that Broly's latent power in his youth surpassed that of the young Vegeta. Additionally mentioned by Paragus was that he may have turned into a Ōzaru (大猿; lit. "Great Ape") after looking at Vampa's moon, an ability all Saiyan's with tails have, but is lost after their tail is cut off, something Paragus did to protect himself and Broly. However, facing off against Vegeta, Broly unlocked Ekari, which gives him the boosts of the Ōzaru, without transforming into one, but still loses control of himself. After Paragus is killed by Frieza, Broly unlocks the Super Saiyan transformation, in a manner similar to how Goku unlocked it after the death of Krillin, but loses his sanity, and combined with Ekari the transformation becomes Super Saiyan Full-Power. Goku states in the conclusion of the movie that the new incarnation of the character's power may surpass that of the God of Destruction Beerus.

== Appearances ==
=== Dragon Ball Z ===
==== Broly Trilogy movies ====
Debuting in Dragon Ball Z: Broly – The Legendary Super Saiyan Paragus lures Vegeta, Goku, and their companions to another planet, where Broly encounters Goku and goes into a rage, destroying the mind control device and becoming the unstoppable Legendary Super Saiyan. He effortlessly pummels Super Saiyan Goku, Vegeta, Gohan, Trunks, and Piccolo before killing his father. Goku eventually defeats him, but Broly somehow manages to make his way into an escape pod. His backstory was given in this movie. He was born with a power level of 10,000 on the same day as Goku, which ultimately made him the target of summary execution at the order of the reigning Saiyan monarch King Vegeta due to fear that he'll ultimately prove a threat to his rule. This resulted in him being stabbed and left to die with his father Paragus before narrowly escaping Planet Vegeta's destruction at the hand's of Frieza. According to Paragus, Broly's rage stems from Goku's power riling up his Saiyan instincts.

Returning in Dragon Ball Z: Broly – Second Coming, he crash-lands on Earth and becomes frozen over by a lake of water until the cries of Goku's son Goten awakens him. Broly fights a long battle against Goten, Trunks, and a Super Saiyan Gohan before a triple combined Kamehameha wave from Goku, Gohan, and Goten defeats him by blasting him through the sun.

Dragon Ball Z: Bio-Broly, blood samples make their way into the hands of an industrialist, who creates a clone of the original Broly. The clone eventually wakes up and becomes mixed with bio-liquid, mutating him into a creature known as "Bio-Broly" (バイオブロリー, Baio Burorī). He fought Goten, Trunks, Android 18, and Krillin and is eventually defeated by a combined Kamehameha attack after his body is exposed to seawater and becomes petrified as a result.

==== Dragon Ball Z: The Real 4-D at Super Tenkaichi Budokai ====
Dragon Ball Z: The Real 4-D at Super Tenkaichi Budokai (ドラゴンボールZ ザ・リアル4-D at 超天下一武道会, Doragon Bōru Zetto Za Riaru Fō-Dī atto Sūpā Tenkaichi Budōkai; lit. 'Dragon Ball Z: The Real 4-D at the Super Number One Under Heaven Martial Arts Gathering') is an interactive 4-D cinematic theme attraction at Universal Studios Japan, and the successor to Dragon Ball Z: The Real 4-D. The film starts as an OVA before transitioning to CGI 3D models. The story takes place during a martial arts tournament, where the Legendary Super Saiyan (Broly) returns with a new God form (God Broly). He can overpower a Super Saiyan Blue Goku and knock out cold a Super Saiyan Blue Vegeta. With the audience's help, Goku can perform a unique God fusion and blasts God Broly away with his God Kamehameha.

=== Dragon Ball Super ===
A canon version of Broly reworked into a quiet and slightly naïve Saiyan with a penchant for exploding in rage, debuts in the 2018 film, Dragon Ball Super: Broly, which tells the story of Goku, Vegeta, and Frieza encountering the exiled Saiyan for the first time. Broly's retconned storyline portrays him as an abnormally powerful Saiyan who is exiled to the wasteland planet Vampa by King Vegeta out of fear and jealousy of his power. Broly is portrayed as a rough and quiet character with significant social naivety from his time spent living on a desolate world. He displays additional personality traits that are deemed rare in Saiyans, such as compassion, gentleness, and a refusal to fight simply for the sake of fighting. Despite his initial docility, Broly has trouble controlling his power whenever provoked by severe stress, anger, or sufficient physical exertion such as when fighting; when he loses control, Broly enters a destructive, mindless berserker state in which he possesses little to no sanity or ability to distinguish friend from foe.

He is also emotionally scarred by his father Paragus violently disciplining him via shock collar, but in spite of this abusive upbringing, Broly remains loyal to his father. Broly spent four decades living in exile with Paragus, being raised as an ultimate weapon of revenge against King Vegeta until they are rescued by soldiers of the Frieza Force, Cheelai and Lemo, who quickly befriend Broly. Recruited by Frieza and headed for Earth, Paragus unleashes Broly upon Vegeta to take his revenge on the Vegeta Royal Bloodline. Broly, untrained for battle against other powerful Saiyans, nevertheless quickly adapts against Vegeta and Goku, but gradually loses control of his mind and enters his Ekari (Wrathful) transformation. Later in the film, in a bid to use Broly's rage as a power increase against Goku and Vegeta, Frieza kills Paragus and calls Broly's attention to his father's death, lying to him that it was a stray energy blast from his fight with the other two Saiyans that killed his father.

Paragus's death successfully provokes Broly, who transforms into the Super Saiyan form, at the total cost of his sanity. In this form, he defeats Goku and Vegeta in their Super Saiyan Blue forms, forcing them to retreat, before Broly turns his attention to Frieza and attacks him, provoking Frieza to transform into his Golden transformation, although it makes little difference against Broly. Goku and Vegeta, with the guidance of Piccolo and in spite of Vegeta's prideful hesitation, practice the Fusion Dance but fail twice, leaving Frieza at Broly's mercy for an hour. Ultimately, Goku and Vegeta succeed in fusing, becoming Gogeta. Gogeta returns to battle and enters his Super Saiyan form, resuming the battle with Broly.

Gogeta and Broly clash, causing reality to 'break' around them. Broly enters Super Saiyan Full Power, The Legendary Super Saiyan's ultimate form, and in turn, Gogeta turns Super Saiyan Blue. The two continue fighting, with Gogeta trying various techniques against Broly, including a Full-Force Kamehameha to end the fight. Cheelai and Lemo use the Dragon Balls to transport Broly back to Vampa with a wish from Shenron before Gogeta can finish him off with the attack. Later, Cheelai and Lemo settle down with the reverted Broly but are visited by Goku, who brings the group supplies and offers to teach Broly how to control his power, befriending him and sparking a friendly rivalry between them.

Broly is next seen on Planet Beerus, being trained with Goku and Vegeta under Whis and Beerus. Goku tries to teach Broly how to control in his anger midfight to prevent becoming an uncontrollable beast, but Whis has Broly sit out from training for the time being until he learns. Later on Vegeta is training Broly and does the same thing, talking to Broly on how he should not be afraid to use his full power, but should learn to control it. Whis notices that Broly has started to become better at controlling his anger while spectating his training.

Broly makes a cameo appearance in the 2022 film Dragon Ball Super: Super Hero, while training with Goku and Vegeta under Whis to control his rage and power. After Gohan acquires his new 'Beast' form, Goku convinces him, along with Trunks and Goten, to spar on Beerus' planet. While Gohan and Goku fight, Broly notices how Gohan has learned to control his anger in his new form. This prompts Goku into setting up a sparring match between Broly and Gohan, in hopes of the latter helping Broly control his anger. During their fight Broly is able to transform into a Super Saiyan form without losing control and being fully aware of what's happening. Vegeta, Goku, Trunks, and Goten then join in, creating a massive Saiyan brawl. After they're all worn out, Broly joins the rest of the Saiyans in a giant meal before the others head back to Earth.

=== In other media ===
Broly debuted in the video game Dragon Ball Z Super Butoden 2 (1993). Since then, Broly has frequently been included in several Dragon Ball Z-related video games, along with fellow movie and Dragon Ball GT characters such as Bardock, Cooler, Janemba, Baby and Omega Shenron. Dragon Ball Z: Buu's Fury loosely adapted his second film and features him as a boss. In Dragon Ball Z: Supersonic Warriors 2 (2005), Broly is the subject of three side stories: one that deals with what would have happened if Broly and Paragus succeeded in destroying the Z-Fighters; another, Broly being placed under the control of Dr. Gero; the third, Broly arriving during the Majin Buu Saga and bonding with Mr. Satan. In Dragon Ball Z: Burst Limit (2008), he has his own story mode entry alongside Dende, which is a loose adaptation of his debut film's narrative. Both his original and Super incarnations appear as playable characters via downloadable content in the video game Dragon Ball FighterZ (2018). Both the Z and Super incarnation's of Broly appear as playable characters in Dragon Ball: Sparking! Zero (2024).

Although Broly never appears in the original manga, he appears as a frequent antagonist in the spin-off manga, Dragon Ball Heroes: Victory Mission (2012), written by Toyotarō in Weekly Shōnen Jump and published by Shueisha, where he acts as the henchman to Genome in the latter's plan to retrieve the Black Star Dragon Balls. His battle with Goku and Vegeta in Dragon Ball Super: Broly is teased in a panel that follows the conclusion of the Universal Tournament arc for Dragon Ball Super.

== Reception ==
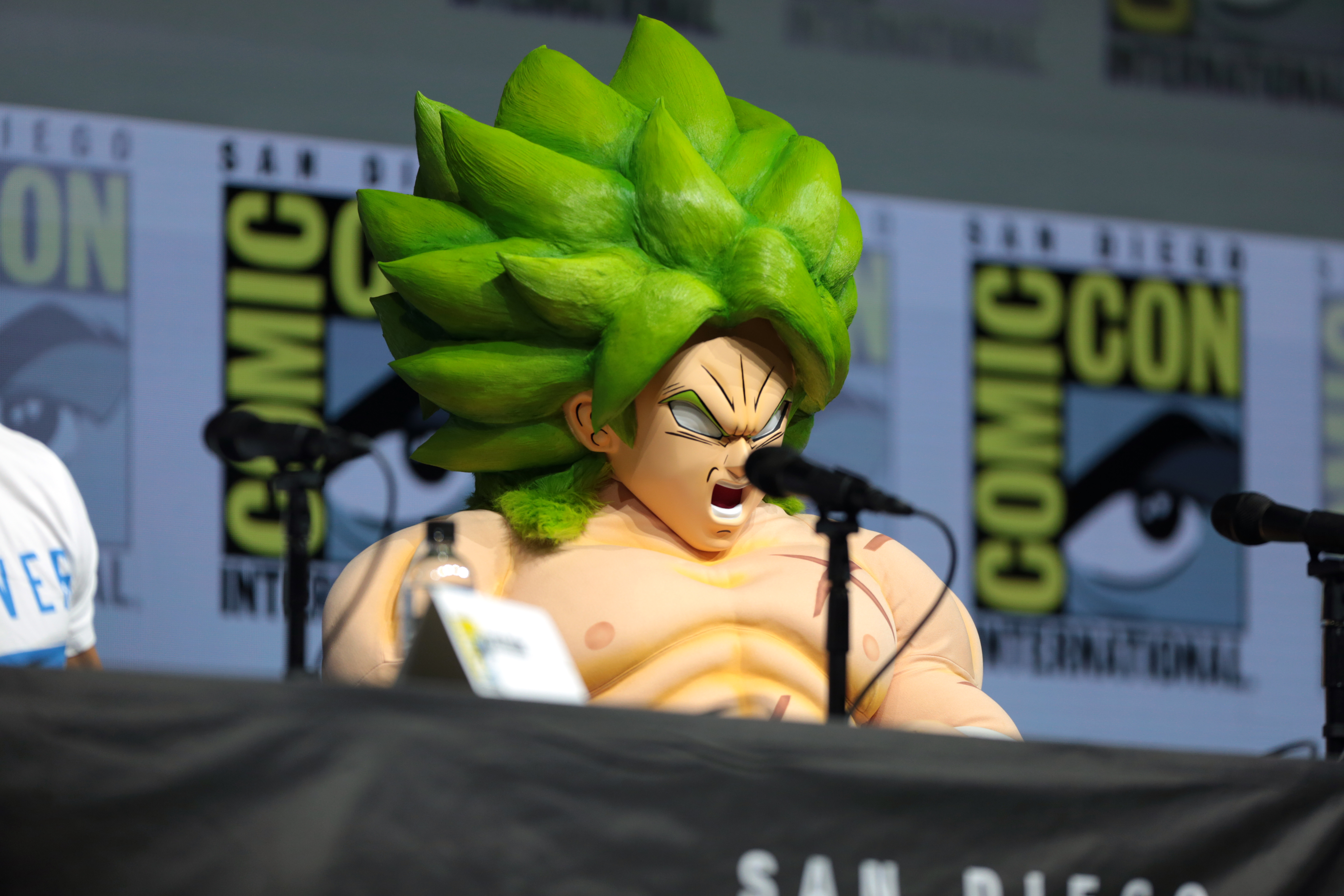
Broly's cosplay on Dragon Ball Super panel at San Diego Comic-Con, 2018.

Broly is considered to be one of the most popular villains within the Dragon Ball series, with a cult following. He placed second by fan vote in a poll of Dragon Ball antagonists published by the March 2018 issue of V Jump. Chris Carle from IGN ranked Broly as tenth on IGN's list of Top 13 Dragon Ball Z Characters. In a 2016 list of the best Dragon Ball Z fights, the fight between Broly and Goku and others in the first movie was ranked as seventh; and the fight against Goten, Gohan and Goku in the second movie, as sixth. On the character's popularity, Will Harrison from Polygon drew parallels between Broly and Boba Fett from Star Wars. Shawn Saris, also from IGN, states that one of the characteristics that makes Broly memorable is his frightening size as well as brutal behavior during fights.

The Dragon Ball Super character Kale has received particular attention from critics as well as Dragon Ball fandom due to her similarities to the original version of Broly.

== See also ==
- List of Dragon Ball characters
