= Caulifla and Kale =

Female Saiyans from the Dragon Ball franchise

- Dragon Ball character
- Caulifla (left) and Kale (right) as depicted in Dragon Ball Super
- First appearance: Caulifla: Dragon Ball Super episode #88: "Gohan and Piccolo Master and Pupil Clash in Max Training!" (2017); Kale: Dragon Ball Super episode #89: "A Mysterious Beauty Appears! The Enigma of the Tien Shin-Style Dojo?" (2017)
- Created by: Toei Animation; Akira Toriyama
- Voiced by: Japanese; Yuka Komatsu (Caulifla); Yukana (Kale); English: Elizabeth Maxwell (Caulifla); Dawn M. Bennett (Kale)

In-universe information
- Species: Saiyan

Caulifla (Japanese: カリフラ, Hepburn: Karifura) and Kale (Japanese: ケール, Hepburn: Kēru) are two interconnected fictional characters from the Dragon Ball media franchise. Created as part of a collaborative effort between franchise creator Akira Toriyama and Toei Animation, the characters first appeared in the Universal Saga arc of Dragon Ball Super as antagonistic characters from an alternate universe to the setting of the Dragon Ball series: Kale was originally conceived as a derivative character of popular Dragon Ball Z villain Broly by Toei Animation staff, and Caulifla was personally designed by Toriyama as a companion and counterpoint to Kale.

Members of the extraterrestrial humanoid species known as the Saiyans (サイヤ人, Saiya-jin), Caulifla and Kale are the first female characters in the series outside of video games to have attained Super Saiyan forms. During the Universal Survival Saga storyline, both characters utilize a matching pair of magical earrings known as Potara (ポタラ) which allow them to merge into a single being known as Kefla (ケフラ, Kefura), whose resulting power rivals that of series's main protagonist Son Goku. Caulifla and Kale are voiced by Yuka Komatsu and Yukana in the Japanese, and by Elizabeth Maxwell and Dawn M. Bennett in the English dub respectively.

Both individual characters as well as Kefla have received a positive reception, leading to appearances in other franchise media like the promotional web series Super Dragon Ball Heroes, as well as various licensed Dragon Ball video games.

== Characteristics ==
Caulifla's characterization has been described as "arrogant, ambitious, and eager for a challenge", while her visual design is reminiscent of a wild, "lawless child" with an unparalleled "battle sense". Her personality is a strong contrast to the rest of the Saiyan people in Universe 6, more akin to the Saiyans of Universe 7 who are known for their aggression and prideful behavior. She is also passionate about improving her own strength and power, which is evident when she learns from her Universe 7 counterparts about various advanced, more powerful forms a Saiyan could attain.

Kale is presented as Caulifla's best friend, sister figure, and protégé. She is a very meek and timid individual by nature; she is devoted to Caulifla and desires is to fight alongside her as equals. Her backstory is portrayed similarly to the original version of Broly from Universe 7, an immensely powerful being known as the Legendary Super Saiyan who emerges with each passing millennia. Her feelings of jealousy towards other individuals who interact with Caulifla would emerge as a strong trigger for her to manifest an uncontrollable transformation into an immensely powerful and highly muscular Super Saiyan form, though her personality is warped into a crazed opposite of her usual self. Shifting through emotions while in her berserk-like state, she would become excessively violent and savage, showing no mercy to anyone who stands in her way.

Both characters are depicted as possessing prodigious potential in terms of power, attaining advanced stages of Super Saiyan transformation which the main characters of the series have taken much more time and effort to achieve.

== Concept and design ==
Neither Caulifla nor Kale were part of Akira Toriyama's initial rough draft for Dragon Ball Super. Kale originated as a concept inspired by Broly, a menacing and immensely powerful Saiyan villain from the Dragon Ball animated film series. Toei Animation production staff decided to make the character female as an interesting variant on the original. After Toriyama is shown the character's design, he decided to create another character to be paired with Kale, much in the way Vegeta and Goku would occasionally work together as a team in the series. Toriyama incorporated the characters into the storyline for the manga, and Toei Animation staff likewise did so with the anime version.

Caulifla's name follows Toriyama's vegetable-inspired naming tradition for Saiyan characters, her name being a pun on cauliflower. Like other Saiyan characters in the series, Caulifla has black spiky hair in her base form, which turns golden yellow when she transforms into a Super Saiyan. On the other hand, Kale's hair turns a shade of green when she transforms, which mirrors Broly's Legendary Super Saiyan form, and enters a trance-like fury in a similar manner as the Berserkers of Old Norse legend. Unlike the Saiyans of Universe 7, Saiyan characters from Universe 6 like Caulifla and Kale lack tails.

When Kale and Caulifla merge to become Kefla, the voices of their voice actresses had to be synced up as part of their performance. Series Director Ryōta Nakamura noted that while Komatsu normally looked at images from the anime when recording her lines, Yukana would maintain eye contact with Komatsu's mouth to sync up her voice with her colleague's.

== Appearances ==
=== Dragon Ball Super ===
In the Universal Survival Saga of Dragon Ball Super, Caulifla is introduced as the brash and headstrong leader of a group of Saiyan delinquents residing in their homeworld Sadala in Universe 6, a parallel universe to Universe 7 which is where the vast majority of the ‘’Dragon Ball’’ series takes place. The Saiyan Cabba recruits her and Kale, who is shy and timid but unknowingly demonstrates an immense hidden power when agitated, to compete on behalf of their home universe in the multiverse-oriented Tournament of Power, where eight 10-person teams fight in a battle royale to ensure the survival of their respective universe, with the winner of the tournament being given access to the powerful wish-granting Super Dragon Balls.

In both anime and manga versions of the story arc, Kale in her frenzied Saiyan form eliminated multiple competitors from the tournament. She would later merge with Caulifla to become Kefla using a matching pair of Potara earrings. In the anime, Kefla is defeated and blasted out of the arena by Goku while in Ultra Instinct -Sign- form; in the manga, Kefla and Goku's son Gohan eliminate each other from the tournament.

=== In other media ===
Caulifla, Kale and Kefla have appeared in Super Dragon Ball Heroes, as well as in licensed Dragon Ball video games such as Dragon Ball FighterZ and Dragon Ball Xenoverse 2 where Kefla is a playable character, with Caulifla and Kale becoming playable characters in an update to the game in November 2021.

== Reception ==
Caulifla and Kale have received a generally positive reception. Kofi Outlaw from ComicBook.com said that the pair were somewhat divisive characters in the anime, whereas their manga versions were better received. Numerous commentators said that they represent the first appearance of female Saiyan characters in the main series, and have since amassed a fan following. The reveal of Kale's transformation in episode 93 of the original Japanese Dragon Ball Super anime drew an enthusiastic response from viewers on social media. Nick Valdez from ComicBook.com noted that the moment Caulifla and Kale first fused into an amalgamated character was one of the most popular moments of in the series. Nakamura credited their popularity to the commendable performance by the characters' respective voice actresses.

Megan Peters from ComicBook.com called Caulifla a brash Robin Hood figure, who "breaks the law to help those who cannot help herself", and liked that she is not portrayed as a mindless criminal in the manga as she is depicted as prioritizing the needs of others over hers. Shawn Sharis from IGN said Caulifla's introduction in the anime piqued his interest in the character and praised her "striking introduction" to viewers. Saris also singled out Caulifla's attainment of the Super Saiyan form in Episode as a "landmark moment" for the entire series, and praised the visual representation of the gathering energy in her body, though he remarked in his review of Episode 100 that the depiction of Caulifla's rapid growth in power level is problematic and makes the struggles endured by the series' main characters in the past "seem silly by comparison". Outlaw argued that given Caulifla's popularity and unexplored potential, a Dragon Ball spinoff starring her "comes with rich character arcs, plus a premise that inherently allows for some exciting and action-packed story arcs".

In his review of Episode 93 of Dragon Ball Super, Saris said Kale "steals the show", from her emergence as a sudden threat for the other tournament competitors to her abrupt shift in personality. Saris noted that the show competently handled Kale's "wild transformation into a crazed warrior", showcasing her immense power and uncontrollable rage while being different enough from Broly in terms of personality. Some commentators have suggested that Kale's emotional attachment to Caulifla is homoerotic in nature. Attention was drawn to one episode where Kale gets jealous at their fellow Saiyan Cabba and attacks him after getting the impression that Caulifla wants to spend more time with him.

Saris also praised the depiction of Caulifla and Kale's teamwork dynamic, which he said is reminiscent of the pairing of Goku and Vegeta. He did not initially like the idea of the characters merging into the amalgamated being known as Kefla in Episode 114; he felt that the introduction of the Potara Earrings into the Tournament of Power goes against its rules, and that it "felt like a cheap way to introduce a sudden power increase mid-battle". Saris later commented that Episode 115 does give Kefla a proper introduction, and by Episode 116 he formed the view that "the weeks of build-up around Kefla help make her character compelling and worth rooting for". The final battle between Kefla and Goku in his Ultra Instinct form, where she is presented as "extremely energetic and aggressive" while he seems "impossibly calm and composed", was considered a series highlight by multiple commentators. Sam Stone from CBR consider Kefla to be the most interesting Super Saiyan in Dragon Ball, as well as the strongest female character within a series long dominated by male characters. Dave Trumbore from Collider praised Kefla's introduction as one of several memorable homages by Super to the classic series.

=== Analysis ===
David Sunil analyzed the characters within the context of the excessively masculine woman superhero trope in popular media. He noted that the idea of these characters as "strong" female characters is solely based on their physical prowess in battle, as well as their embodiment of masculine characteristics in order to be validated or taken seriously as characters. While he commended the effort for "shattering" the damsel in distress trope, he argued that their empowerment as characters is undermined when "all they can do is punch and fight equal if not better to than the men in the given narrative".

== In popular culture ==
Both individual characters and their merged form as Kefla have been popular subjects for expressions of fan labor, such as cosplay and fan art. Caulifla in particular inspired a mural erected in Los Angeles by artist Jake Merten.
