= Dragon Ball Z: The Legacy of Goku =

- Genre: Action role-playing
- Developer: Webfoot Technologies
- Publishers: NA: Infogrames; EU: Infogrames Europe; JP: Banpresto (LoG II only)
- Creators: Dana Dominiak (LoG); Murray Kraft (LoG II); Debra Osborn (Buu's Fury)
- Artist: Mandi Paugh (characters)
- Writers: Israel Smith (LoG); Gerry Swanson (LoG II and Buu's Fury)
- Composers: Ariel Gross (LoG); Yannis Brown (LoG II and Buu's Fury)
- Platform: Game Boy Advance
- First release: Dragon Ball Z: The Legacy of Goku; May 14, 2002
- Latest release: Dragon Ball Z: Buu's Fury; September 14, 2004
- Spin-offs: Dragon Ball Z: Taiketsu; Dragon Ball GT: Transformation

Dragon Ball Z: The Legacy of Goku is a series of action role-playing video games for the Game Boy Advance, based on the anime series Dragon Ball Z and part of the Dragon Ball video game series. The first game, Dragon Ball Z: The Legacy of Goku, was developed by Webfoot Technologies and released in 2002. The game was followed by two sequels: Dragon Ball Z: The Legacy of Goku II, released in 2003, and Dragon Ball Z: Buu's Fury, released in 2004.

== Gameplay ==
A gameplay screenshot from Buu's Fury. To the top left, a status bar containing the player's remaining HP (red gauge), remaining energy (green gauge) experience points (blue gauge), and transformation gauge (a yellow tension triangle) can be seen. The player's currently selected energy attack can also be seen at the far left of the status bar. To the lower left, a time limit can be seen that details how long a fusion has until it ends.

The games are action-adventure RPGs. The player controls a Dragon Ball character and experiences various portions of the franchise. Combat is the main focus of the game. The player can press the 'A' button to use physical strikes, while the 'B' button allows the player to unleash a variety of energy-based attacks. Energy attacks drain an energy gauge - though it gradually recharges when not in use. Energy attacks can be cycled through with the 'L' button, and more energy attacks are learned as the player progresses through the game.

Legacy of Goku II and Buu's Fury featured transformations that made the player character temporarily stronger, using their own 'rage mode' mechanic. By defeating enemies, the player receives experience points, which allow the player character to level up and grow stronger. Legacy of Goku II and Buu's Fury also feature consumable items that would restore the player character's health or energy, as well as equipment that increases the player character's stats. Legacy of Goku II and Buu's Fury also allow the player to use a device called a scouter, which is used to look up the stats of the various characters and enemies in the games, as well as basic information about them.

== Plot ==
=== Dragon Ball Z: The Legacy of Goku ===
The game covers the story of Dragon Ball Z up until the destruction of the planet Namek, where Goku is the only playable character. Goku travels through different stages, including several locations of the earth and planet Namek, and gains experience not only by defeating enemies, but also by completing simple missions. In the final stage, Goku transforms into a Super Saiyan in order to defeat Frieza, this being the first introduction to character transformations in the series, which will later be very common in the following games. It is also one of the first GBA games to feature full-motion video, predating the Game Boy Advance Video.

=== Dragon Ball Z: The Legacy of Goku II ===
Dragon Ball Z: The Legacy of Goku II was released in North America by Infogrames under the Atari brand name on 17 June 2003. The plot of the game picks up where The Legacy of Goku left off, and continues until the end of the Cell Games Saga, when Gohan defeats the evil android Cell (between episodes 118 and 194).

Due to the game's success, it was released in Japan as Dragon Ball Z: The Legacy of Goku II International, on 23 July 2004.

=== Dragon Ball Z: Buu's Fury ===
Dragon Ball Z: Buu's Fury is the third and final game in the series. It was released on 14 September 2004 in North America. The game focuses on the final parts of the Dragon Ball Z series (season 7), namely the battles with Majin Buu; the first chapter takes place during episode 195 to episode 199, whilst the rest of the game takes place during episode 200 (after a seven-year flash-forward) and the following episodes.

=== Cancelled fourth game ===
In 2016, Webfoot Technologies claimed to be starting development of another sequel, which was cancelled due to a lack of funding.

== Characters ==
The Legacy of Goku games feature a variety of characters from the Dragon Ball universe for the player to play as. In the first game, only Goku was playable. However, in subsequent games in the series, multiple characters were playable, such as Gohan, Goten, Trunks (kid and future), Piccolo, Vegeta, and Hercule.
