= Dragon Ball Z: The Legacy of Goku II =

- North American box art
- Developer: Webfoot Technologies
- Publishers: NA: Atari; EU: Infogrames; JP: Banpresto
- Platform: Game Boy Advance
- Release: NA: June 17, 2003; EU: August 1, 2003; JP: July 23, 2004
- Genre: Action-adventure
- Mode: Single-player

Dragon Ball Z: The Legacy of Goku II is a 2003 action role-playing video game developed by Webfoot Technologies and published by Atari for the Game Boy Advance. It is based on the anime Dragon Ball Z and is the sequel to The Legacy of Goku, the second of three games in the series. It was released in North America on June 17, 2003, in Europe on August 1, and in Japan on July 23, 2004. It is the only Dragon Ball Z game developed in the United States to be released in the franchise's country of origin.

== Gameplay ==
Screenshot of Legacy of Goku II, depicting the player character, Son Gohan, alongside two enemies.

The game introduced several new concepts to the series. The first was transformations, which allowed characters to become temporarily stronger, at the cost of slowly draining their energy bar. The second was the scouter, which allowed the player to look up the stats of other characters, as well as basic information about them. The third was charged melee attacks, which allowed characters to unleash a powerful physical strike after a short charging cycle. The game also allowed characters to further supplement their stats with capsules that were scattered around the game world.

Despite being titled "The Legacy of Goku", this game featured the most limited play as Goku, with the player starting as Gohan and gradually unlocking Piccolo, Vegeta, Trunks, and finally, Goku, as playable characters. Once the story is completed, the player can no longer play as Goku, but will be able to continue playing as the others to unlock a final playable character, Mister Satan/Hercule, in order to unlock an alternate ending. The music is based on Bruce Faulconer's score for the FUNimation English dub of Dragon Ball Z.

== Plot ==
The game begins with a prologue in the timeline of Future Trunks, drawing elements from the TV special The History of Trunks. In this alternate future, Son Goku has died of a rare heart disease, while two androids have killed the rest of the Z Fighters and most of the population, leaving Gohan and Trunks as the only surviving Saiyans and the Earth in ruins. Soon after, Gohan fights the androids himself, but is also killed in the battle, and Trunks decides to use a time machine to travel to the present timeline, arriving just before Goku returns from his fight with Frieza.

Coincidentally, Frieza himself has arrived on Earth alongside his father King Cold at the same time, intending to take revenge on Goku by destroying the Earth. Trunks intervenes, quickly killing Frieza and his army. When Goku arrives, Trunks reveals his identity to him, and warns of the androids before returning to his timeline. From there, the game mostly follows the events of the Android and Cell sagas, though it also features elements from other media, notably including Frieza's brother Cooler, who appeared in the Dragon Ball Z movies. This is in addition to the many side quests and other events that happen during gameplay.

== Development and release ==
The game was released by Banpresto in Japan under the title Dragon Ball Z: The Legacy of Goku II International on July 23, 2004. Besides the in game text, the game features additional changes. All characters were given new profile images, and their original Japanese names were reinstated.

== Reception ==
The Legacy of Goku II

Aggregate score
Aggregator	Score
Metacritic	75/100

Review scores
Publication	Score
Electronic Gaming Monthly	5.5/10
Game Informer	7.5/10
GamePro	3.5/5
GameSpot	7.6/10
GameZone	7.5/10
IGN	8/10
NGC Magazine	59%
Nintendo Power	3.5/5
Nintendo World Report	8/10
X-Play	4/5

In the United States, the game sold 630,000 copies and earned $16 million by August 2006. During the time between May 2002 and August 2006, it was the 42nd highest-selling game for the Game Boy Advance in that country.

The Legacy of Goku II received "generally favorable reviews" according to Metacritic.
