= Bases Loaded (video game) =

1987 video game

- North American NES cover art
- Developers: Jaleco; Tose (NES version)
- Publisher: Jaleco
- Designer: Nobukazu Ota (NES version)
- Programmer: Tetsuji Tanaka (NES version)
- Composers: Kouji Murata, Akihito Hayashi (NES version)
- Platforms: NES, Game Boy
- Release: NES: JP: June 26, 1987; NA: July 1988; Game Boy: NA: July 1990
- Genre: Sports (baseball)
- Modes: Single-player, Multiplayer

Bases Loaded screenshot

Bases Loaded (Note: Japanese: 燃えろ!!プロ野球, Hepburn: Moero!! Pro Yakyū; lit. "Burn!! Pro Baseball") is a baseball video game originally developed by Tose and published by Jaleco for the Nintendo Entertainment System. It was first released in 1987 in Japan and in 1988 in North America, and a Game Boy port was released in July of 1990. For the Virtual Console, Bases Loaded was released on September 11, 2007, in Japan and on April 7, 2008, in North America for the Wii, and on May 15, 2013, in Japan and on July 10, 2014, in North America for Nintendo 3DS. The Wii U version in North America (which later released in Japan on October 22, 2014) was also released at the same time as the Nintendo 3DS version. A port by Mebius and Clarice Games for the PlayStation 4 was released in Japan in 2015.

The game is the first installment in the Bases Loaded series, followed by seven sequels across three generations of consoles. There are three more video games in the Bases Loaded NES series, Bases Loaded II: Second Season, Bases Loaded 3 and Bases Loaded 4. There was also a Game Boy version of Bases Loaded. The series continued onto the SNES platform with Super Bases Loaded, Super Bases Loaded 2, and Super Bases Loaded 3. The final entry to the series was Bases Loaded '96: Double Header, released for the Sega Saturn and PlayStation.

Bases Loaded is also the first in a series of sports games by Jaleco known in Japan as Moero!!. Baseball games were localized in the Western markets as the Bases Loaded series while the basketball game was localized as Hoops, the tennis game as Racket Attack and the soccer game as Goal!. Two titles went unlocalized: a baseball game Shin Moero!! Pro Yakyū and a judo game Moero!! Juudou Warriors.

== Gameplay ==
The game allows the player to control one of 12 teams in either a single game or a full season. For single games, there is also a two-player option.

Bases Loaded featured a television-style depiction of the pitcher-batter matchup (previously seen in Intellivision World Series Baseball and Accolade's HardBall!), as well as strong play control and a relatively high degree of realism, which made it one of the most popular baseball games of the early NES.

One unique feature of the game is that the pitcher can provoke a batter to charge the mound. Each team has only one batter (usually the team's best hitter) who can be provoked in this manner, however; it is up to the player to discover who it is.

At the time Bases Loaded was released, few video games were licensed by North American major league sports. Therefore, the league depicted in Bases Loaded is a fictitious league of twelve teams.

== Disembodied catcher's mitt ==
One of the trademark images of the Bases Loaded franchise was the disembodied catcher's mitt, also referred to as the "phantom paw", that would catch pitches that were thrown extremely outside. Developer Heep Sop Choi claims it was programmed to show the catcher making some terrific snatches without any bodily movement.

== Release ==
A defective chip was found during manufacturing, delaying the Nintendo Entertainment System version's North American release.

A port for the Atari Jaguar was planned to be developed by Jaleco, after being signed by Atari Corporation to be a third-party developer for the system, but it was never released.

Bases Loaded was re-released to Steam, PS5, and Nintendo Switch in 2025 as part of the Jaleco Sports series, with porting and development by Sickhead Games and publishing by Rock It Games. The release included Bases Loaded for NES and Super Bases Loaded for SNES, with original manuals and box art viewable from inside the game.

== Sequels ==
The game saw three sequels on the NES: Bases Loaded II: Second Season (released in 1988 in Japan and 1990 in North America), Bases Loaded 3, released in 1991, and Bases Loaded 4, released in 1993. The game also had two arcade sequels: Moero!! Pro Yakyū Homerun, released in 1988, and Jitsuryoku!! Pro Yakyū, released in 1989. Japanese game magazine Game Machine listed Jitsuryoku!! Pro Yakyū on their September 1, 1989 issue as being the eighth most-successful table arcade unit of the month; the magazine has listed it in English as Bases Loaded. Super Bases Loaded was released for the SNES in 1991, and saw two sequels: Super Bases Loaded 2, released in 1994, and Super Bases Loaded 3, released in 1995. A 32-bit installment was also released: Bases Loaded '96: Double Header, released for the PlayStation and Sega Saturn in 1995.

== Reception ==
Computer Gaming World compared the game unfavorably to Accolade's HardBall!, both focusing primarily on the confrontation of pitcher and batter. The review described Bases Loaded's viewpoint behind the pitcher as making it far too difficult to discern the position of, and subsequently hit, the ball. Other annoyances during gameplay, such as the inability to see where outfielders were before the ball got to them, were contrasted against the game's good graphics and animation.
