= Densetsu no Starfy 3 =

2004 video game

- Developer: Tose (Note: Co-produced and supervised by Nintendo Software Planning & Development.)
- Publisher: Nintendo
- Directors: Akio Imai; Azusa Tajima
- Producers: Yasuhiro Minamimoto; Hitoshi Yamagami
- Designer: Koutarou Shinoki
- Programmers: Satoshi Nakajima; Kouichi Kitano
- Artist: Yasuko Takahashi
- Composer: Morihiro Iwamoto
- Platform: Game Boy Advance
- Release: JP: August 5, 2004
- Genre: Platform
- Modes: Single-player, multiplayer (minigames only)

Densetsu no Starfy 3 (Note: Japanese: 伝説のスタフィー3, Hepburn: Densetsu no Sutafī 3 lit. The Legendary Starfy 3) is a platform video game developed by Tose and published by Nintendo for the Game Boy Advance in Japan on August 5, 2004. It is the third game in The Legendary Starfy series. Its sequel, Densetsu no Starfy 4, was developed for the Nintendo DS. It received its re-release on the Nintendo Classics service on July 12, 2024, in all regions for the first time along with the other GBA entries, albeit not translated from Japanese.

== Plot ==
In the beginning, a short time after Densetsu no Starfy 2's storyline, everything is calm, and everyone, including the protagonist Starfy is happy again, until a thunderstorm comes and shakes Pufftop Palace. A lightning bolt strikes the Magic Jar and destroys it, and the antagonist of the previous titles, Ogura, is freed once again. He flies away from Pufftop Palace, leaving everyone else wondering what he was leaving for. Starfy's father tells Starfy and Moe that it falls to them to stop Ogura for a third time. Moe becomes angry and refused, because he is bored of doing the same things they did in the past. Later, Starfy's sister, Starly, jumps and bounces on Moe, and introduces herself to him. She later pushes him and her brother off the edge of Pufftop Palace and jumps down with them to pursue Ogura.

== Gameplay ==
Screenshot of Densetsu no Starfy 3

Like its predecessors, Densetsu no Starfy 3 plays very much like other platforming games, such as some Super Mario Bros. titles and some Kirby titles, but it's mostly about swimming around stages, which makes this series' official game genre a marine platform. In fact, the colorful graphics and level layouts (as well as the look of Stafy) have drawn many comparisons to the Kirby series. Stafy himself can run, jump, and attack via spinning; he also gains access to various transportation objects and animal familiars as the games progress. Like Densetsu no Starfy 2 and unlike the first title of the series, Densetsu no Starfy 3 usually has a certain number of stages per area, with each stage split up into four sub-stages. Most of the other stages' goals are centered around retrieving a lost or stolen item for another character, including Wario. There are many items to collect and many enemies to defeat. The player can move Starfy on land by running and jumping, but when Starfy is in watery areas, he can move much more freely, push obstacles, and so on. Like the previous games, this game also includes minigames, except all of them are different compared to the ones that are similar to Atari's Breakout.

== Development ==
After the release of Densetsu no Starfy 2, Nintendo and Tose moved on to develop Densetsu no Starfy 3. The game was developed in less than a year, and included some features that the previous games didn't have, such as multiplayer minigames. However, like its predecessors, Nintendo and Tose aired animated television commercials for Densetsu no Starfy 3, as well as releasing some promotional merchandise. Perfume, a J-Pop group, recorded and played their own version of The Legendary Starfy main theme during the credits of a Japanese television show, Oha-Sta. Despite that being made, it was not released in retail stores.

== Reception ==
Densetsu no Starfy 3 was the second best-selling game in Japan during its week of release, at 42,000 copies. By the end of 2004, the game sold a total of 212,946 copies in the country. Japanese gaming publication Famitsu gave the game a total score of 31 out of 40. In 2009, Nintendo Life gave the game a score of 10 out of 10 and called it "one of the best platformers ever created". In 2023, Time Extension included the game on their list of "Best GBA Games of All Time".
