= Dragon Ball GT: Final Bout =

1997 video game

- Original North American cover art featuring Goku
- Developer: Tose
- Publisher: Bandai: NA: Atari (2004 reprint)
- Designers: Jun Hayashibara; Kei Matsurikita
- Series: Dragon Ball
- Platform: PlayStation
- Release: JP: August 21, 1997; NA: October 1997; EU: November 6, 1997; JP: July 20, 2000 (The Best); EU: October 4, 2002 (reprint); NA: August 24, 2004 (reprint)
- Genre: Fighting
- Modes: Single player, multiplayer

Dragon Ball GT: Final Bout, known in Japan and Europe as Dragon Ball: Final Bout (ドラゴンボール ファイナルバウト, Doragon Bōru Fainaru Bauto), is a fighting game for the PlayStation. The game was developed by TOSE and released by Bandai in Japan, Europe and North America in 1997, making it the first North American release for a Dragon Ball video game.

Despite the North American title referencing the anime series Dragon Ball GT, the game's story has no direct correlation to Dragon Ball GT, with the cast of playable characters being an equal mix of characters from Dragon Ball GT and its predecessor series Dragon Ball Z. The Dragon Ball GT anime series was not localized for North America until the early 2000s. Reviews for the game were largely negative.

The game was reissued in Europe in 2002 (and translated to further languages) and in North America in 2004. The game shares the distinction of being the first Dragon Ball game to be rendered in full 3D, and the last Dragon Ball game produced for the PlayStation. There would not be another Dragon Ball game for consoles until the release of Dragon Ball Z: Budokai in 2002.

== Gameplay ==
Final Bout gameplay, featuring a match between Pan and a young Super Saiyan Goku.

The game's gameplay similar to the Butōden series, playing out entirely in two dimensions but featuring 3D environments and characters from the Z and GT series of the Dragon Ball franchise. The fighters can fly to almost any point on the playing field. Unique in the game are special ki attacks called Special Knockout Trick. These are the spectacular versions of the character's ki attacks the character performs at a distance. When these attacks are performed, the camera cuts and pans to the attacking character, who powers up and fires. During the attacking character's power up, the opposing character has the opportunity to either retaliate or block when the word counter flashes on the lower right hand corner of the screen. If the player chooses to retaliate, they too power up and fire a ki attack, causing a power crossfire. Whichever player presses their beam button the fastest will push their opponent's super back and force their own super to damage their opponent. Another feature carried over from The Legend is the Meteor Smash technique. With a key combo, players can ignite a chain of mêlée attacks.

== Modes of play ==
=== Battle Mode ===
The standard mode, subdivided in "Vs Man", where a player can face another player, and "Vs Com", where the player fights a series of random CPU-controlled opponents and a final boss similar to Arcade Mode.

=== Tournament Mode ===
Subdivided in "The Tournament", in which up to 8 characters (either human or computer controlled) fight in a single-round elimination tournament, and "Build up the Tournament", where the characters are carried over from Build Up Mode, loaded from the memory card.

=== Build Up Mode ===
Carried over from Ultimate Battle 22, this feature gives the player the chance to train a character of their choosing and save them via a memory card. Unlike Ultimate Battle 22, this version of the mode allows to build the characters' strength to triple digit levels, and comes with an experience chart in the character's profile. Like Ultimate Battle 22, players have the opportunity to battle their friends with their character in the option called Build Up Battle.

== Playable characters ==
The game's roster features a match-up from the Dragon Ball Z and GT series, starting with the principal cast from the GT series: Goku, Trunks, and Pan. This was the first game to feature Pan, while Vegeta, Gohan, Piccolo, Cell, Frieza, and Buu came straight from the Z series. The only unplayable character is Baby Vegeta in his Oozaru form, serving as the game's final boss. The unlockable characters consist of the adult Super Saiyan form of Goku in his GT outfit, the Super Saiyan forms of GT kid Goku and Trunks, Z series Super Saiyan Goku, Super Saiyan Future Trunks, Vegetto and the Super Saiyan 4 form of Goku.

=== Naming conventions ===
The original Japanese release of the game was unique for its naming conventions for all the characters. All the adult incarnations of Goku are referred by his full name "Son Goku" (孫悟空) while his child incarnation is referred simply as "Goku" (悟空), and his Z series incarnation is presented in all capital rōmaji "SON GOKOU". GT Trunks is referred by his katakana "トランクス", while Future Trunks is presented in all capital English text "TRUNKS". Nearly all Super Saiyan characters are referred with the prefix Super (超), and Super Saiyan 4 Goku is referred as "Super 4 Son Goku" (超4孫悟空). This also applies to the super form of Oozaru Baby Vegeta who is referred as "Super Baby" (スーパーベビー). Both Vegeta and Vegito are simply referred as Vegeta and Vegetto and not Super Vegeta and Super Vegito despite they are both in Super Saiyan form. Finally, Kid Buu is referred as simply "Buu" (ブウ).

== Development ==
Bandai kept Final Bout under wraps for most of its development. Responding to rumors that Dragon Ball Z: The Legend was being released in the U.S., Jeff Rotter, associate producer of Bandai of America, said that negotiations were underway to bring a Dragon Ball Z game to North America, but did not identify the game. Final Bout's surprise unveiling at the 1997 Tokyo Toy Show came when the game was half-finished and less than six months away from its Japanese release.

== Music ==
Dragon Ball Final Bout: Original Soundtrack

Soundtrack album by Kenji Yamamoto
- Released: September 16, 1997
- Genre: Anime
- Length: 49:57
- Language: Japanese
- Label: Zain Records

The composition was done once again by Kenji Yamamoto. Out of all the pieces used in game, only five were new material, and the rest were remixed arrangements of previously used music from both 16- and 32-bit eras. The game also featured four brand new songs, the opening theme "Biggest Fight", the closing themes "Kimi o Wasurenai" and "Thank You", and Goku's Super Saiyan 4 theme "Hero of Heroes". All of these songs were performed by Hironobu Kageyama with Kuko providing backup vocals. On September 16, 1997, nine of the compositions and the four songs were released by Zain Records exclusive in Japan as Dragon Ball Final Bout: Original Soundtrack (ドラゴンボール ファイナルバウト オリジナルサウンドトラック, Doragon Bōru Fainaru Bauto Orijinaru Saundotorakku). The Future Trunks theme arrangement "Hikari no Willpower" was featured as a hidden bonus track.

Track listing

#	Japanese title	Romaji title	Translated English title	Length
1.	「THE BIGGEST FIGHT ～激突～」	"The Biggest Fight" ~Gekitotsu~	The Biggest Fight: Clash	3:32
2.	「冒険の旅」～Classic arrange version～	"Bōken no Tabi" ~Classic arrange version~	Journey of Adventure: Classical Arrangement Version	2:41
3.	「孫悟空演部曲」～Classic Arrange Version～	"Son Gokū Enbu-Kyoku" ~Classic Arrange Version~	Son Goku's Fighting Routine Waltz: Classical Arrange Version	2:56
4.	「孫悟空、新たな飛翔！」～Powerful arrange version～	"Son Gokū, Arata na Hishō!" ~Powerful arrange version~	Son Goku's New Flight!: Powerful Arrange Version	3:50
5.	君を忘れない	Kimi o Wasurenai	I Won't Forget You	3:54
6.	「山吹色の戦士」～Symphony classic version～	"Yamabuki-Iro no Senshi" ~Symphony classic version~	The Golden Warrior: Symphony Classical Version'	3:54
7.	交響曲・ニ短調「魔人」	Kōkyōkyoku Nitanchō "Majin"	Symphony in D-minor: "Majin"	4:39
8.	「閃光のポタラ！」～Techno house version～	"Senkō no Potara!" ~Techno House Version	The Gleaming Potara!: Techno House Version	5:08
9.	THANK YOU !	Thank You!	Thank You!	3:53
10.	「パンの願い」～Piano Ballad version～	"Pan no Negai" ~Piano Ballad version~	Wish of Pan: Piano Ballad Version	1:12
11.	交響詩「復讐」	Kōkyōshi "Fukushū"	Symphonic Poem: "Revenge"	4:22
12.	HERO OF HEROES	Hero of Heroes	Hero of Heroes	5:00
Hidden bonus track	光のWILL POWER	Hikari no WILL POWER	Willpower of Light	4:56

== Release ==
The game was first released in Japan in 1997 under its original title Dragon Ball: Final Bout. It fared well enough in sales to be reissued under the PlayStation the Best for Family series a year later. In parts of Europe (France, Belgium, Spain and Portugal), the game was also released under the name Dragon Ball: Final Bout in 1997.

In North America, the game was released as Dragon Ball GT: Final Bout, and it was the first time a Dragon Ball video game was released in North America with the Dragon Ball license intact.

In October 2002, Bandai (with distribution through Infogrames) released the game in the UK, along with other European countries that previously did not officially receive the game. though it had already seen widespread distribution through the grey market. Finally, under little fanfare, Atari reissued the game in North America in 2004 with brand new artwork supplied by Toei Animation. This release coincided with Funimation's dub of Dragon Ball GT.

== Localization ==
When the game was released throughout North America, several changes were made for localization. Dialog by the Japanese voice actors was replaced, but not by the then current voice cast at Ocean Group. Instead, Bandai America used an uncredited cast of U.S. voice talent. However, the battle voices still consist of the Japanese voice cast, causing the character voices to clash. The game's opening theme, "Biggest Fight", was replaced with an untitled instrumental rock track. The cast credits at the end of the game, also set to "Biggest Fight", were removed completely. The two closing songs "Kimi o Wasurenai" and "Thank You!" remain instrumental even when the game is beaten on normal and difficult settings. However, Super Saiyan 4 Goku's theme, "Hero of Heroes", was left unchanged. At the title screen, the game's sound test is available, whereas in the original Japanese players could only access it with a cheat code. The Buildup data transfer option was removed due to the fact Ultimate Battle 22 had not been released at that time. When the game was reissued in 2004, the game's data was not altered in any way from its 1997 North American release by Bandai.

The European 1997 version, like with most European Dragon Ball Z games from the 16-bit and 32-bit era, was released mostly unaltered from the Japanese version, featuring the original Japanese voice acting and the opening theme "Biggest Fight". The game text was only translated to French because of the lack of official release in any English-speaking country. When the game was re-issued in Europe in 2002 (which included a release for the first time in English-speaking countries like the UK), the game was kept the same as the previous European version except for the texts being re-translated to English and other languages.

== Reception ==
Reception

Aggregate score
Aggregator	Score
GameRankings	46%

Review scores
Publication	Score
Electronic Gaming Monthly	8/10, 6/10, 7/10, 6.5/10
Famitsu	21/40
GameSpot	3.3/10
IGN	3/10
Next Generation	1/5
Dengeki PlayStation	55/100, 50/100

In Japan, the game sold 245,000 units. In North America, due to Dragon Ball not being popular in the region at the time, Bandai America initially only produced around 10,000 copies of the game. The game eventually sold 19,564 units in the United States by 2002, bringing its combined sales to 264,564 units in Japan and the United States.

Commentary on the game has varied widely; while most reviews were negative, they gave differing reasons for why the game failed. Some of the more common criticisms were that the pace is too slow, the camera is jerky and confusing due to a lack of panning and opponents' ability to move out of view, and the controls respond too slowly to button presses. American critic Jeff Gerstmann reviewed the Japanese release of the game as an import for GameSpot, despite acknowledging that a U.S. release was a near certainty by this time. He praised the visual spectacle of the beam clashes, but found the gameplay suffers from a lack of variety in both the characters and the move sets. IGN also found the move sets lacking, but primarily criticized the controls, concluding, "If you're a Dragon Ball Z fan, then you may like this game, simply because it stars all your favorite Dragon Ball characters. But to be honest, you might as well go out and buy all the toys -- at least they're more controllable." GamePro instead focused criticism on the Meteo moves, which the reviewer called "one of the cheapest, longest-lasting special moves in fighting history". He also derided the sparse backgrounds, breakup in the character models, and childish taunts.

The game did receive positive assessments from most of the four-person Electronic Gaming Monthly review crew, with Sushi-X calling it "a 'guru game', a game that stretches our abilities with a game engine so complex to master, yet simple enough for a beginner" and taking a more positive perspective on the taunts, describing them as "hilarious". Co-reviewer John Ricciardi agreed that it is a very different sort of fighting game which proves rewarding for those who adjust to its quirks, and Kelly Rickards said it is clearly superior to previous Dragon Ball games, while Dan Hsu fell more in line with the majority opinion, summarizing that "It's different, but frankly, most of you won't like it." Next Generation called it "inarguably the worst PlayStation fighting game ever made", complaining that the character models do not resemble the Dragon Ball characters closely enough and ridiculing how characters in flight use the same poses as when they are standing. This contradicted IGN, who had described the character models as "very true to their anime counterparts".
