= Dragon Ball Z: Shin Butōden =

1995 video game

- Developer: Tose
- Publisher: Bandai
- Producer: Takeo Isogai
- Composer: Kenji Yamamoto
- Series: Dragon Ball
- Platform: Sega Saturn
- Release: JP: November 17, 1995
- Genre: Fighting
- Modes: Single-player, multiplayer

Dragon Ball Z: Shin Butōden (Note: Japanese: ドラゴンボールZ: 真武闘伝, Hepburn: Doragon Bōru Zetto: Shin Butōden; lit. "Dragon Ball Z: True Fighting Legend") is a 1995 fighting video game developed by Tose and published by Bandai for the Sega Saturn. Based upon Akira Toriyama's Dragon Ball franchise, its gameplay is similar to the Super Butōden sub-series, consisting of one-on-one fights featuring special moves, as well as five playable modes including one featuring Mr. Satan as the main character.

Announced under the working title Dragon Ball Z: Super Butōden Sega Saturn, Shin Butōden shares the same character sprites and roster with another Dragon Ball Z fighting game developed by Tose for the PlayStation, Ultimate Battle 22, released months earlier. The game garnered average reception from critics; Reviewers praised the character roster and multiple game modes, particularly the Mr. Satan mode, but most felt mixed regarding the audiovisual presentation. The title sold approximately between 59,035 and 110,000 copies during its lifetime in Japan.

== Gameplay ==
Gameplay screenshot

Dragon Ball Z: Shin Butōden is a fighting game similar to the Super Butōden sub-series. Players fight against other characters in one-on-one matches and the fighter who manages to deplete the health bar of the opponent wins the bout and becomes the winner of the match. The game contains five modes of play: Story mode, Versus mode, Group Battle mode, Tournament mode, and Mr. Satan mode. The game also features a roster of 22 playable characters and their respective transformations. Characters available are: Goku, Piccolo, Vegeta, Frieza, Android 18, Android 16, Cell, Trunks, Gohan, Tien Shinhan, Dabura, Majin Buu, Mr. Satan, and Gogeta.

Shin Butōden uses a customizable control scheme. Special moves are present in conventional format, with most commands consisting of button combinations. Characters can dash back and forth, and also charge their Ki gauge to unleash a special attack. Returning from the Super Butōden sub-series is the split-screen feature: when one of the two combatants moves far away in the playfield, the view is split to keep both fighters shown in a single screen while their positioning is kept via an on-screen radar. In Group Battle, players gets to create a team of five characters and fight against either another player or an AI-controlled character. In Mr. Satan mode, Mr. Satan is trying to raise enough money to pay off his debt to Android 18, and the player places bets on matches and cheats by using several items, such as banana peels, guns, and dynamite.

== Development and release ==
Dragon Ball Z: Shin Butōden was first announced under the working title Dragon Ball Z: Super Butōden Sega Saturn. It was produced by Takeo Isogai of Bandai's multimedia division. Toei Animation participated in the game's production with the creation of character sprites. Shin Butōden shares the same character sprites and roster with another fighting game developed by Tose for the PlayStation called Dragon Ball Z: Ultimate Battle 22, which was released months earlier on July 28, 1995. The soundtrack was composed by Kenji Yamamoto. The title was released by Bandai for the Sega Saturn in Japan on November 17, 1995.

== Reception ==
Reception

Review scores
Publication	Score
Consoles +	85%
Famitsu	22/40
Joypad	82%
M! Games	50%
Mega Force	84%
Sega Saturn Magazine (JP)	5.66/10
Última Generación	70/100

Dragon Ball Z: Shin Butōden garnered average reception from critics. Readers of Saturn Fan and the Japanese Sega Saturn Magazine voted to give the game scores of 19.5 out of 30 and 6.1549 out of 10 respectively, ranking among Sega Saturn games at the number 765 spot in a 2000 public poll. According to Famitsu, the title sold over 43,077 copies respectively in its first week on the market. It sold between 59,035 and 110,000 copies during its lifetime in Japan.

Joypad's Grégoire Hellot praised the game's character roster and multiple game modes, particularly the Mr. Satan mode, but criticized the visuals and sluggish sprite animations. Consoles +' Maxime Roure and Marc Menier found Shin Butōden better than Dragon Ball Z: Ultimate Battle 22 on PlayStation. They commended the game's overall presentation, audiovisual department, attack animations, and playability. Mega Force's Laurent Cotillon felt the game did not make proper use of the Sega Saturn hardware, comparing the game with Dragon Ball Z: Buyū Retsuden on Sega Mega Drive. Spanish Última Generación's Javier Sanz Fernández wrote that "Bandai offers fans of the series a remarkable title that faithfully transmits the essence of the television characters". Fernández gave positive remarks to the game's graphical aspect for its large character sprites, as well as the various game modes.

MAN!AC's Robert Bannert said the game was slimmed down compared to Ultimate Battle 22, noting its blurry visuals and hectic controls. Writing for the official Spanish Dragon Ball GT magazine, Álvaro Prieto stated that the game "integrates the best aspects of all Dragon Ball fighting games". José Ángel Ciudad of Spanish magazine GamesTech expressed appreciation towards its game system, which he found similar to those of the SNES entries. HobbyConsolas' Antonio Sánchez-Migallón highlighted the game's stages for being faithful to the anime compared to Ultimate Battle 22, as well as the character artwork. In a retrospective outlook, MeriStation's Salva Fernàndez wrote that Shin Butōden was not balanced or playable as Dragon Ball Z: Super Butōden 2, feeling that it paled in several aspects.
