= Super Bases Loaded 2 =

1992 video game

- North American cover art
- Developer(s): Tose
- Publisher(s): Jaleco
- Composer(s): Takeshi Ichida
- Platform(s): Super NES
- Release: JP: August 7, 1992; NA: February 1994
- Genre(s): Traditional baseball simulation
- Mode(s): Single-player; Multiplayer

Super Bases Loaded 2 (released in Japan as Super 3D Baseball, and in South Korea as Korean Pro Baseball) is a Super Nintendo Entertainment System baseball game. The game is the sixth overall installment of the Bases Loaded series, and second installment of the secondary series for the Super NES.

== Gameplay ==
The battery backup allowed players to save several categories of statistics for all 14 teams in the two leagues, and not just their own. The DSP chip allowed a rudimentary 3-D perspective for batting and sometimes infield play. When players swung, their own individual numbers appeared on the back of their jerseys.

There were seven teams each in the "Alpha League" and the "Omega League" that went by city names only, and often borrowed symbols from those of the original Super Bases Loaded. The nicknames in quotation marks are those of the original SBL teams for whom the symbols were based, but do not appear in the game. The Alpha League (based on the American League) consisted of the Boston "Kings", the Chicago "Lizards", the Cleveland "Stars", the Detroit "Storm", the Kansas City "Tornadoes", Oakland "Eagles", and Seattle "Blue Wave". The Omega League (based on the National League) consisted of the Atlanta "Weasels", Houston "Doves", the Los Angeles "Cyclops", the New York "Mercs", Philadelphia "Bruins", the Pittsburgh "Buzzards", and the San Francisco "Amoebas".

In addition, there were four edit teams: Urbana, Rockford, Peoria, and Aurora, all towns from Illinois.

== Reception ==
GamePro commented of the game: "It doesn't have name players or teams. It doesn't have the best graphics. It doesn't have great sounds. What Super Bases Loaded II does have in abundance, however, is playability. This is simply a fun and easy game to play".

== See also ==
- Super Professional Baseball II
