= Goal 2 =

Goal 2 may refer to:

- Goal II: Living the Dream - a movie
- Goal! Two - a video game
- Sustainable Development Goal 2 - a goal by the United Nations
