= Super Professional Baseball II =

1992 video game

- Cover art
- Developer: TOSE
- Publisher: Jaleco
- Series: Super Professional Baseball
- Platform: Super Famicom
- Release: JP: August 7, 1992
- Genre: Traditional baseball simulation
- Modes: Single-player, multiplayer

Super Professional Baseball II (スーパープロフェッショナルベースボールII; "Super Professional Baseball 2") is the sequel to Super Professional Baseball.

== Summary ==
Although Super Professional Baseball was the basis for the North American port called Super Bases Loaded, Super Professional Baseball II is a significantly different game than Super Bases Loaded 2. The end result of either winning a single game or winning the championship is fireworks followed by a ticker-tape parade.
