= Super Goal! 2 =

1993 video game

- North American box art
- Developer: Tose
- Publisher: Jaleco
- Platform: Super Nintendo Entertainment System
- Release: JP: November 26, 1993; NA: April 1994
- Genre: Sports
- Modes: Single-player, multiplayer

Super Goal! 2, known in Japan as Takeda Nobuhiro no Super Cup Soccer (Note: Japanese: 武田修宏のスーパーカップサッカー, Hepburn: Takeda nobuhiro no Sūpā Kappu Sakkā; lit. "Nobuhiro Takeda's Super Cup Soccer"), is a soccer video game developed by Tose and published by Jaleco for the Super Nintendo Entertainment System. It is the sequel to Goal!.

== Gameplay ==
The Japanese version allows players to compete for the Super Cup either with or against Nobuhiro Takeda, one of the greatest football players in all of Japan. There are teams from Europe, North America, Central America, Caribbean, South America, Africa, and Asia, Oceania. The North American release (published as part of the Goal! series) removed the references to Takeda.

== Release ==
GOAL! 2 and Super Goal 2 were re-released to PS5 and Nintendo Switch in 2026 as part of the Jaleco Sports series, with porting and development by Sickhead Games and publishing by Rock It Games. The release included GOAL! TWO (North American release) and GOAL! 2 (European release) for NES, SUPER GOAL! 2 for SNES, and GOAL!! for Famicom, with original manuals and box art viewable from inside the game in multiple languages and regions.

== Reception ==
Reception

Review score
Publication	Score
Electronic Gaming Monthly	7/10, 7/10, 6/10, 6/10

In Electronic Gaming Monthly, two reviewers complimented that they did not need knowledge of soccer to enjoy themselves, while all reviewers complimented the amount of options and easy play control in the game. Two reviewers said that the players were too small on the field, making it easy to lose where your characters were during play.

== See also ==
- Goal!
- Super Soccer
