= Bases Loaded '96: Double Header =

1995 video game

- North American Saturn cover art
- Developer: Jaleco
- Publisher: Jaleco
- Series: Bases Loaded
- Platforms: PlayStation, Sega Saturn
- Release: PlayStation: JP: November 22, 1995; NA: December 22, 1995; Saturn: JP: November 22, 1995; NA: March 1996
- Genre: Sports (baseball)
- Modes: Single-player, Multiplayer

Bases Loaded '96: Double Header (Note: (known in Japan as Moero!! Pro Yakyuu '95: Double Header)) is a 1995 baseball video game developed and published by Jaleco for the PlayStation and Sega Saturn.

== Development ==
This game was the eighth and final game in the Bases Loaded series and the only one developed internally by Jaleco, after Tose had developed the previous seven installments. Like Super Bases Loaded 3, Double Header was licensed by the Major League Baseball Players Association (MLBPA) and uses real MLB players, but it was not licensed by Major League Baseball (MLB) itself; all stats and attributes reflected the 1995 MLB season.

== Reception ==
Reception

Review scores
Publication	Score
AllGame	1.5/5 (PS1)
Next Generation	1/5 (PS1/SAT)
Dengeki PlayStation	35/100, 45/100, 50/100, 50/100 (PS1)

Next Generation's brief review of the PlayStation version stated: "Jaleco's long-running baseball series ran out of steam long ago, and this totally disappointing 32-bit incarnation is a perfect reason to let it die". They scored both it and the Saturn version one out of five stars.
