= Demon Sword =

1988 video game

- North American box art
- Developer: TOSE
- Publisher: Taito
- Platform: Nintendo Entertainment System
- Release: JP: March 29, 1988; NA: January 1990
- Genre: Platform
- Mode: Single-player

Demon Sword (不動明王伝, Fudō Myōō Den; "The Legend of Acala") is a 1988 platform game developed by TOSE and published by Taito for the Nintendo Entertainment System.

== Plot ==
The game starts out with an evil demon ruling over the world and its inhabitants, who live in fear of it. However, a man named Victar, who comes from a small village, has a sword that can destroy the demon. The blade had previously been split up into pieces, though, and Victar must travel through three worlds to get back the three broken pieces in order to restore the sword to defeat the demon.

== Gameplay ==
Basic ground gameplay with sword attack. Enemies crumble when beaten and may leap high.

Player can throw ninja stars. Either attack can be used in mid-air.

The game contains three worlds, with two stages in each of them plus a final stage making 7 stages total. In order to regain the pieces of the shattered sword and advance in the game, the player must defeat a boss at the end of every stage. As more pieces of the sword are recovered, the sword itself grows in length and power. The player will also encounter enemies on the way to the boss, which must be defeated with a variety of weapons and magic spells, such as the character's Demon Sword (which he begins the game with), arrow darts, and power beams. The player can also jump over enemies and change direction in midair, as well as land in and run on top of trees. However, the player must be careful when jumping, as there are various traps, such as holes, that the player can land in. Gameplay physics and action are overall similar to a previous Taito game, The Legend of Kage (1985).

=== Regional differences ===
- There are six more stages and several bosses in the Japanese version that are unavailable in the North American version.
- Some stages are different and some enemies are missing in the North American version.
- The player in the North American version has a vitality gauge for each life remaining, while the player in the Japanese has only life count.
- There are more items and magic spells available in the Japanese version.
- The players can upgrade the power of shurikens in the North American version.
- Enemies take more damage in the North American version.
- The ending in the Japanese version has extra scenes and text cut from the North American version.
- The cover used for the English release of Demon Sword features a muscular bare-chested bronzed man, whereas the sprite in the game appears to be a paler lithe man wearing a red kimono, and the Japanese release features a character more similar to the in-game sprite.
