= Bandai Golf: Challenge Pebble Beach =

1989 video game

- Box art
- Developer: TOSE
- Publisher: Bandai
- Platform: Nintendo Entertainment System
- Release: NA: February 1989
- Genre: Sports
- Modes: Single-player, multiplayer

Bandai Golf Challenge Pebble Beach is a golf video game released for the Nintendo Entertainment System. It was released by Bandai. The game is named after Pebble Beach, a golf course on California's Pacific Coast.

The game implements real world physics in addition to the traditional rules of golf, and consistently places players against the notoriously harsh winds of Pebble Beach. As with the game's real life counterpart, the Pacific Ocean plays a prominent role on the course and adds to the difficulty of play.

== See also ==
- List of Nintendo Entertainment System games
