= Legends of the Diamond =

1992 video game

- Cover art
- Developer: Tose
- Publisher: Bandai America
- Composer: Tatsuya Nishimura
- Platform: NES
- Release: NA: January 1992
- Genre: Sports
- Modes: Single-player, multiplayer

Legends of the Diamond is a baseball simulation video game developed by Tose for the Nintendo Entertainment System, and published by Bandai in North America in 1992.

The game features playable simulations of 30 famous Major League Baseball players, including Babe Ruth and Lou Gehrig. Six of the playable characters are pitchers: Bob Gibson, Cy Young, Dizzy Dean, Lefty Gomez, Whitey Ford, and Steve Carlton.

== Gameplay ==
Cy Young is one of the pitchers available in the game.

Legends of the Diamond offers an exhibition game mode and a tournament mode. Before each game, the player chooses between a modern stadium (which is better for pitchers and fielders) and an old-fashioned baseball field (which is better for batters). Simulated players are programmed with career stats of the real players in their prime.

The player controls the pitcher from a viewpoint behind the batter, rather than from behind the pitcher, as in some baseball simulations. The player can throw three different pitches. The pitching coach interjects if the player underperforms; this feature is absent from most baseball simulations of the 1980s and 1990s.

Unlike many baseball simulations, the player also controls all fielding (infield and outfield ball retrieval).
