= Bases Loaded 3 =

1990 video game

- Box cover
- Developer(s): Tose
- Publisher(s): Jaleco
- Composer(s): Tatsuya Nishimura
- Platform(s): Nintendo Entertainment System
- Release: JP: July 27, 1990; NA: September 1991
- Genre(s): Traditional baseball simulation
- Mode(s): Single-player; Multiplayer

Bases Loaded 3 screenshot

Bases Loaded 3, known in Japan as MoePro! Yakyū '90 Kandō Hen (燃えプロ!'90 感動編, MoePro! Baseball '90 Excitement Version), is a baseball video game released in 1990 by Jaleco for the Nintendo Entertainment System. The game is the third installment of the Bases Loaded series.

== Gameplay ==
The object of the game is to win an exhibition game of baseball, as the game does not have a season play option. After an exhibition game is completed, the player is given a numerical score based thirteen categories, including batting, errors, and spectacular plays. The score ranges from 1 to 100, but a player can score over 100 points by earning bonus points for jumping and diving catches.

Jaleco hired professional baseball player Ryne Sandberg for an endorsement. However, this installment of the game did not feature real teams or players. More unpopular with players, however, was the somewhat bizarre premise that "playing a perfect game", not winning a pennant, was the game's ultimate goal. Regardless, there would be one more NES Bases Loaded title, as well as several Super NES titles.

The game is the third in the NES Bases Loaded series, following Bases Loaded II.

== Credits ==
Both the US and Japanese versions of the game contain staff credits. Both versions have the same exact staff credits except the composer. In the Japanese version, the composer is credited as "God of Soul". In the USA version, he is credited as "Music Lover". This is an alias for Tatsuya Nishimura (as revealed in Bases Loaded 4). It is unknown why the credit was changed in the USA version, probably because of Nintendo of America's policy of not having religious references.
