= Dusty Diamond's All-Star Softball =

1989 video game

- North American box art
- Developer: Tose
- Publishers: Tonkin House; Broderbund
- Composer: Yuko Sano
- Platform: NES
- Release: JP: October 27, 1989; NA: July 1990
- Genre: Sports (softball)
- Modes: Single-player, multiplayer

Dusty Diamond's All-Star Softball (released in Japan as Softball Tengoku) is a one or two player Nintendo Entertainment System video game where players can select various fictional softball players and customize their own team to take to the championship.

== Gameplay ==
In 1-player mode, the player attempts to win one game on each available field. Upon doing so, the player then faces a difficult all-female team called "The Amazons" on the professional field. Defeating the Amazons beats the game. In 2-player mode, players play an "exhibition game."

Players choose either fast-pitch or slow-pitch mode, the playing field, a team of ten players from the 60 available characters, and a team name from a list of 26 names, one for each letter of the alphabet.

Despite the game being a softball game, the rules are more reminiscent of baseball, with the exception that each game is played to a maximum of seven innings (unless extra innings are needed to break a tie). The game also features a mercy rule, with the game ending if someone leads by 10 or more runs after an entire inning is played.

== Characters ==
Players assemble their teams from 60 characters, some of whom have noticeable trademarks. For instance:

- Diablo looks like an ogre. He bats with a club, and runs very slowly.
- Zelda looks like a witch, and bats with a broom.
- Froggy skips as he runs.
- Casey has the ability to float in the air while playing defense.

== Fields ==
The game features six different playing fields, each with its own features and ground rules.

- Sandlot: Based on a traditional sandlot, the field has areas with high grass and rocks that can interfere with a live play. To hit a home run, the player only has to hit a ball over the "home run line," not beyond the fence.
- Park: There is a pond in foul territory. The area beyond the home run line has trees, park benches, and a mud puddle that can interfere with the play.
- Cliff: Any hit that rolls under the picket fence in right field is a ground-rule double.
- School: Based on a schoolyard. A fly ball that lands beyond the home run line is a home run, but if it breaks a window on the school building then it's an automatic out instead.
- Island: Similar to a professional field, with an outfield fence.
- Professional: Standard field. Only available in 1-player mode after defeating the computer on the other five fields.
