= Dragon Ball Z: Idainaru Dragon Ball Densetsu =

1996 video game

- Developers: BEC, Tose
- Publisher: Bandai
- Composer: Kenji Yamamoto
- Series: Dragon Ball
- Platform: PlayStation, Sega Saturn
- Release: PlayStation: JP: 31 May, 1996; Sega Saturn: JP: 31 May, 1996; EU: December 1996
- Genre: Fighting
- Modes: Single-player, multiplayer

Dragon Ball Z: Idainaru Dragon Ball Densetsu (Note: Japanese: ドラゴンボールZ 偉大なるドラゴンボール伝説(ドラゴンボールゼット いだいなるドラゴンボールでんせつ), Hepburn: Doragon Bōru Zetto: Idainaru Doragon Bōru Densetsu; lit. "Dragon Ball Z: The Greatest Dragon Ball Legend", also known as Dragon Ball Z: The Legend in Europe and Dragon Ball Z: La Grande Légende des Boules de Cristal in France.) is a 1996 fighting video game co-developed by BEC and Tose and published by Bandai for the PlayStation and Sega Saturn. Based upon Akira Toriyama's Dragon Ball franchise, following the Saiyan arc to the conclusion of the Majin Buu saga, it is the first three-dimensional fighting game in the series prior to Budokai Tenkaichi. Its gameplay consists of three-on-three fights taking place on free-roaming 3D arenas, using a main six-button configuration, featuring special moves as well as three playable modes.

Dragon Ball Z: Idainaru Dragon Ball Densetsu garnered generally positive reception from critics. Some reviewers drew comparison with Dark Edge and Psychic Force due to the freedom of movement during combat and noted its combination of strategy and fighting elements. The game was praised for its presentation, story mode, large character roster and gameplay but criticism was given towards the audio design and pixelated visuals, among other aspects between each version. The PlayStation and Saturn versions sold approximately 300,000 copies combined during their lifespan in Japan.

== Gameplay ==
The gameplay features the multiple exchangeable fighters battle and the blue/red meter that determine who will makes a special "Meteo Attack" (PlayStation version shown).

Dragon Ball Z: Idainaru Dragon Ball Densetsu is a fighting game similar to Dark Edge and Psychic Force. Players fight against other characters in three-on-three matches and the fighter who manages to deplete the health bar of the opponent wins the battle. The game features three modes of play, one of which must be unlocked, a roster of 35 playable characters and their respective transformations. The story mode of the game is divided into episodes, and it encompasses all of Dragon Ball Z, featuring the most important battles of the series. During the story mode, players can reproduce events from the original story; recreating certain events from the anime can trigger additional sequences and unlock further characters. The title utilizes a unique system of play that is different from most other fighters, using sprites in a free-roaming three-dimensional arena.

Although each battle begins on the ground, the majority of the action is featured skyward. The characters fly around each other and utilize rapid punches and kicks, and ki blasts, either singularly or rapidly by holding the assigned button for a short period. The characters have a limited amount of ki that can be charged over time. If the player uses all of their available ki their character will stop fighting out of exhaustion, leaving them wide open for an attack. The life meter is a scale made up of energy from both sides that shifts depending on damage taken, and after one side is depleted, the character performs a special "Meteo Attack", which takes place in a cut scene and finishes off the opponent. Each match is made up of two teams that can include one fighter or multiple fighters (up to 3) that can be switched out at various times.

Elements of the combat system were derived from Bandai's earlier Dragon Ball Z: Idainaru Son Goku Densetsu (1994) for the PC Engine CD. In a retrospective, MeriStation noted that part of the earlier game's system, which combined fighting with strategic opportunities to execute special attacks, was subsequently used as inspiration for the combat mechanics of The Legend.

== Development ==
Dragon Ball Z: Idainaru Dragon Ball Densetsu was developed as a fighting game intended to recreate battles from the Dragon Ball Z manga and animated television series. Unlike conventional one-on-one fighting games, the title featured free-roaming three-dimensional battlefields in which characters could fight both on the ground and in the air. Early previews emphasised the ability to reproduce battles involving multiple characters, including switching between allied fighters during combat.

The game's battle system incorporated a Power Balance gauge that shifted according to the opposing teams' attacks. Players could change active fighters and perform combinations of attacks, including special chain-hit sequences. The combat system was designed to allow battles involving several characters while reproducing the dramatic finishing techniques associated with the original series.

The production also featured an original computer-generated opening sequence, which was showcased in contemporary magazine previews. The opening incorporated imagery of characters and events from the series.

Contemporary development reports placed the game's completion at approximately 50% in February 1996 and 70% in March, before a May 1996 preview reported that development was 100% complete. Later previews provided detailed coverage of the Z Campaign mode, which recreated major confrontations from the Saiyan, Frieza, Cell and Majin Buu storylines.

== Release ==
Dragon Ball Z: Idainaru Dragon Ball Densetsu was first released in Japan by Bandai on 31 May 1996 for PlayStation and Sega Saturn. The Japanese Saturn release was supported by a promotional campaign advertised in Sega Saturn Magazine during May and June 1996. Bandai offered a special poster to the first 50,000 customers purchasing the game, alongside a separate prize draw for promotional merchandise. The game was advertised at a retail price of ¥5,800 before tax.

On 21 August 1996, an album was published exclusively in Japan by Columbia, featuring arranged songs scored by composer Kenji Yamamoto and was re-released as part of Columbia's R-Ban series on 21 October 2001.

In December 1996, the Saturn version was distributed in France, Portugal and Spain as part of an agreement between Bandai, Konami and Sega. The French edition retained the original Japanese name (although it is translated as Dragon Ball Z: La grande légende des boules de cristal on the title screen) but the Spanish edition was renamed Dragon Ball Z: The Legend. In Spain, Sega promoted the Saturn version through magazine advertising that emphasised its six simultaneous combatants and adaptation of the television series. In Portugal, distributor Ecofilmes promoted the Saturn version for the 1996 Christmas shopping season, featuring the game in its contemporary catalogue. The game remained prominent in the company's 1997 catalogue, while Portuguese gaming website SideQuest reported that Ecofilmes imported the French edition during 1997 to meet demand generated by the popularity of the Dragon Ball Z anime. According to SideQuest, the game subsequently became popular and later became one of the more sought-after titles in the PAL Saturn library.

Rumors persisted into 1997 that the Saturn version was being released in the U.S. In response Jeff Rotter, associate producer of Bandai of America, said that negotiations were underway to bring a Dragon Ball Z game to North America, but he did not say which one, and emphasized that there was not yet actual confirmation of any North American release for the franchise. Both versions were re-released as budget titles, on 20 June 1997 for the Saturn, and 27 June 1997 for the PlayStation.

== Music ==
Dragon Ball Z: Indainaru Dragon Ball Densetsu Game Music

Soundtrack album by Kenji Yamamoto
- Released: August 21, 1996; October 21, 2001
- Genre: Anime/Video Game
- Length: 34:52
- Language: Japanese
- Label: Columbia

Dragon Ball Z: Idainaru Dragon Ball Densetsu Game Music (ドラゴンボールZ偉大なるドラゴンボール伝説 ゲームミューヅック, Doragon Bōru Zetto Indainaru Dragon Ball Densetsu Gēmu Myūjikku; Dragon Ball Z: The Greatest Dragon Ball Legend Game Music) is the official licensed soundtrack of the video game. It was released by Columbia Records on August 21, 1996 and again on Columbia's R-Ban series on October 21, 2001.

The game has the distinction of being the only one in the series with an original score during the 32 bit era. The music was composed and arranged by Kenji Yamamoto and includes three vocal version tracks by Hironobu Kageyama and Shin'ichi Ishihara. The red book from Saturn version of the game includes music that can be accessed when played in an ordinary CD player, but some of these tracks are opening narratives by the series narrator Joji Yanami.

Track listing:

1. "Prologue"
2. "Sign~兆~" (Vocal Version)
  SIGN~Kizashi~ (Vocal Version) /Sign: Omen (Vocal Version)
3. "Theme of Assault" (Medley Version)
4. "Crisis" (Powerful Arrange Version)
5. "Fear" (Medley Version)
6. "Theme of Mortification" (Medley Version)
7. "Fire of Black~黒い炎~" (Vocal Version)
  FIRE OF BLACK~Kuroi Honō~ (Vocal Version)/Fire of Black: Black Flame (Vocal Version)
8. "Restoration" (Medley Version)
9. "Exhilarating" (Powerful Arrange Version)
10. "エンディング・テーマ Never Ending, Never Give Up" (Vocal Version)
  Endingu Teimu: Never Ending, Never Give Up (Vocal Version) /Ending Theme: "Never Ending, Never Give Up" (Vocal Version)

Track Credits:

- Music composed by Kenji Yamamoto
- 2 & 10 Hironobu Kageyama
- 7 Shin'ichi Ishihara

== Reception ==
Reception

Review scores
Publication	Score	
Publication	PS	Saturn
Consoles +	91%	90% 92%
Famitsu	N/A	22/40
HobbyConsolas	N/A	83/100
Jeuxvideo.com	14/20	15/20
Joypad	4/5	4/5; 81%
Player One	75%	75%
Superjuegos	N/A	92/100
Absolute PlayStation	5.5/10	N/A
Dengeki PlayStation	50/100, 55/100, 65/100, 70/100	N/A
Sega Saturn Magazine	N/A	7.33/10

Dragon Ball Z: Idainaru Dragon Ball Densetsu was met with generally positive reception from critics, with some reviewers praising the large character roster and comparing the game with both Dark Edge and Psychic Force. Fan reception was also positive: readers of the Japanese Sega Saturn Magazine voted to give the Saturn version a 7.1017 out of 10 score, ranking at the number 626 spot, indicating a popular following. In the August 1996 issue of Computer and Video Games, the PlayStation and Sega Saturn versions of Dragon Ball Z: Idainaru Dragon Ball Densetsu ranked first and second on the magazine's Japanese multi-format sales chart. According to Famitsu, the PlayStation and Saturn versions sold over 70,453 and 61,989 copies respectively in their first week on the market. The PlayStation and Saturn versions sold between 297,527 and 320,000 copies combined during their lifetime in Japan.

Consoles Plus' François Garnier and Maxime Roure reviewed both the PlayStation and Sega Saturn releases, praising the animated visual presentation, longevity and gameplay but heavily criticized the audio design, particularly the music not being audible due to the sound effects. In Spain, Superjuegos selected the Saturn version as the cover game for its December 1996 issue, citing the continuing popularity of Dragon Ball among Spanish players, the game's quality, and its status as the first 32-bit Saturn game based on Akira Toriyama's work released in Spain as reasons for the decision. Reviewing the Saturn version, Hobby Consolas' Sonia Herranz regarded Dragon Ball Z: The Legend as the most curious and strangest Dragon Ball game due to its combination of strategy and fighting elements. Herranz commended the visuals for being faithful to the source material, sound design and action but felt mixed in regards to the gameplay. She also criticized the small size of sprites and "lazy" music. In Italy, Consolemania reviewed the imported Saturn version in July–August 1996, awarding it 79 out of 100. The magazine praised the game's graphics and its recreation of the action depicted in the source material, but criticized its repetitive combat, lack of variety and low difficulty. The reviewer felt that its promising ideas were undermined by disappointing execution. Jeuxvideo.com's Rroyd-Y also reviewed both the PlayStation and Saturn releases, criticizing the pixelated graphics and audio but praised the controls and story mode. Joypad's Grégoire Hellot reviewed the PlayStation and Saturn versions as well, regarding it to be a "very special game and not without interest, but to be reserved for fans of the series..."

Player One's Christophe Delpierre reviewed both the PlayStation and Sega Saturn releases, commending them for their animated audiovisual presentation and playability. Reviewing the Saturn version, Superjuegos' Bruno Sol regarded it as one of the best Dragon Ball Z games alongside Super Butōden 2 and Idainaru Son Goku Densetsu, praising the freedom of movement during combat, game modes and playability but noted that the title could become repetitive and criticized the pixelated visuals. Reviewing the PlayStation version, Both Thomas and Jim of Absolute PlayStation commended the audio and character animations but criticized the graphics, technical issues and short length. In a retrospective of the Dragon Ball video games, Meristation judged the Saturn version to be the better version.

In January 1997, Dragon Ball Z: The Legend was featured on the Portuguese television video game competition programme CyberMaster, broadcast by RTP, where young contestants competed using the game.

== Legacy ==
Retrospective coverage has identified The Legend as an early precursor to the style of three-dimensional combat later associated with the Budokai Tenkaichi series. Everyeye described the game as an antecedent to Budokai Tenkaichi, citing its three-dimensional battles, switching between multiple combatants and emphasis on finishing techniques. MeriStation similarly noted that it presented three-dimensional Dragon Ball battles nine years before the first Budokai Tenkaichi, and regarded the simultaneous use of multiple fighters as one of the game's most distinctive achievements.
