= The Legendary Starfy =

- Logo since 2008
- Genre: Platformer
- Developer: Tose
- Publisher: Nintendo
- Creators: Hitoshi Yamagami (Nintendo); Yasuhiro Minamimoto (Tose)
- Original release: September 6, 2002

The Legendary Starfy (Note: Japanese: 伝説のスタフィー, Hepburn: Densetsu no Sutafī) is a video game series developed by Tose and published by Nintendo. The series began in 2002 with Densetsu no Starfy for the Game Boy Advance, and four sequels were released. For its first seven years, Starfy games were not released outside Japan. The fifth and latest game in the series was released as The Legendary Starfy in North America on June 8, 2009. In July 2024, the first three titles were officially released via the Nintendo Classics service.

The series focuses on Starfy, an anthropomorphic starfish and the prince of Pufftop Palace, who must explore the underneaths of the ocean to save the world from various threats alongsides his friends and family. The first three games focus on Starfy's efforts to prevent Ogura from sabotaging the ocean, while the fourth game focuses on Starfy into saving a distant island, and the fifth game follows Starfy who must stop space pirates from abusing power.

== Games ==
Game	Details
Densetsu no Starfy Original release date(s): JP: September 6, 2002; WW: July 12, 2024	Release years by system: 2002 – Game Boy Advance; 2024 – Nintendo Classics: First title in The Legendary Starfy series.; The first Legendary Starfy Game Boy Advance title.; Originally began development for Game Boy Color.
Densetsu no Starfy 2 Original release date(s): JP: September 5, 2003; WW: July 12, 2024	Release years by system: 2003 – Game Boy Advance; 2024 – Nintendo Classics: The first title to feature a collection of costumes for Starfy to wear.; The first title to have more than one stage per area, instead of one like in the previous title.
Densetsu no Starfy 3 Original release date(s): JP: August 5, 2004; WW: July 12, 2024	Release years by system: 2004 – Game Boy Advance; 2024 – Nintendo Classics: The first title in the series to include multiplayer-compatible minigames.; The first to feature two different playable characters.; The first to have stages with parallax scrolling backgrounds.
Densetsu no Starfy 4 Original release date(s): JP: April 13, 2006	Release years by system: 2006 – Nintendo DS
Densetsu no Starfy 4 Original release date(s): JP: April 13, 2006	Notes: Released only in Japan.; The first title to be rendered in 3D graphics, although only for stage backgrounds, costumes and some scenes.; The first Legendary Starfy Nintendo DS title.
The Legendary Starfy Original release date(s): JP: July 10, 2008; NA: June 8, 2009; AU: October 10, 2009	Release years by system: 2008 – Nintendo DS
The Legendary Starfy Original release date(s): JP: July 10, 2008; NA: June 8, 2009; AU: October 10, 2009	Notes: Released in Japan as Densetsu no Starfy Taiketsu! Daīru Kaizokudan (Note: lit. "The Legendary Stafy Confrontation! Daīru Pirate Squad"); The first Legendary Starfy title to be released outside Japan.; The only Legendary Starfy title to have a cooperative multiplayer. The third game of the series only used the multiplayer features on the minigames.

== Gameplay ==
The Legendary Starfy series are platform games, focusing more on swimming than running and jumping around. Players control the protagonist of the series, Starfy, throughout each game; from the third title onward, Starfy's sister Starly is also playable occasionally. When on land, the controls are equal to the controls of most other platform games. When in the water, players can only move Starfy around using the control pad alone; however, if players want to make Starfy swim faster, they hold the B button down while moving him around. The games are usually composed of multiple stages or worlds, with each stage split up into four sub-stages. Boss characters hide at the end of each world's final sub-stage. Most of the other sub-stages' goals are centered around retrieving a lost or stolen item for another character. Most power-ups are vehicles and costumes. Some are new moves, and some are upgrades for moves and other power-ups.

== Marketing ==
Although there had always been plans to bring the series to North America, the reason why the series stayed in Japan until the announcement of the fifth game was because Nintendo of America had declared the series to be "too Japanese". Nintendo of America has also considered bringing the other four games to North America in some form as well as expanding the series to the Wii, depending on "fan response".

=== Commercials ===
The animated television commercials loosely take place in the plot of whatever title is being advertised, as well as its gameplay. The settings and actions were slightly different compared to the ones in the titles they advertised. For instance, in the first The Legendary Starfy title, Starfy was walking inside the Tenkai Palace while carrying some stuff, including the Magic Jar holding the antagonist, Ogura, until Starfy tripped and dropped the stuff he was carrying, while the Magic Jar fell into the ocean below the Tenkai Palace. But in one of the commercials for the first title of the series, Starfy was walking outside of Tenkai Palace while only carrying the Magic Jar, until he tripped and fell in the ocean along with the Magic Jar. Except for Densetsu no Starfy 3, its commercial is the only one in The Legendary Starfy series that has a different setting. Instead of taking place anywhere in the game, the commercial takes place in a sushi bar, where the characters are standing on plates while being moved around on a conveyor belt. In the Japanese commercials for Densetsu no Starfy 4 and Densetsu no Starfy Taiketsu! Daīru Kaizokudan go back to the way the commercials for the first two titles of the series were, by making them loosely based on the plots of whatever is being advertised.

While Densetsu no Starfy Taiketsu! Daīru Kaizokudan was being planned for release in North America as The Legendary Starfy, a new live-action English commercial for it takes place on a boat "The Falling Star", where an old man and his grandson, fishing, talk about catching a giant squid, the grandson is worried, until the old man assures his grandson that he doesn't have to worry, because he has Starfy. Starfy then pops out of the sea. This is the first North American commercial, airing on May 25, 2009.

=== Merchandise ===
During the release of each game in the series, there have been many kinds of merchandise related to the series released in Japanese retail stores, like plush dolls, pencils, birthday balloons and playing cards. Nintendo also officially produced a manga version of the Densetsu no Starfy series and later, Densetsu no Starfy R with Shogakukan. CD soundtracks from the Starfy series were also released. The one used to promote the first The Legendary Starfy game was sung by BECKY. Kazuki Saya sung to promote Densetsu no Starfy 2. The J-pop group Perfume became the first group to sing the theme song, which was used to promote Densetsu no Starfy 3 during the credits of the Japanese television show Oha-Sta. Despite that being made, it wasn't released in retail stores. In the commercials for Densetsu no Starfy 3, Perfume's song titled Vitamin Drop, was the only song played in a Starfy series commercial that isn't related to the series. Another J-pop group Cute recorded the theme song to promote Densetsu no Starfy 4. The Legendary Starfy, unlike other games in the series, was never promoted with a vocal song nor a CD album by a J-pop singer nor group.

== Manga ==
- Densetsu no Starfy

伝説のスタフィー (Densetsu no Sutafī)
- Genre: Action Adventure, Comedy
- Manga
- Written by: Yumiko Sudo
- Published by: Shogakukan
- Magazine: CoroCoro Comic
- Original run: June 2002 – October 2005
- Volumes: 2
- Manga

Densetsu no Starfy R
- Written by: Suzuo Yadaka
- Published by: Shogakukan
- Magazine: CoroCoro Comic
- Original run: April 2006 – April 2008
- Volumes: 1

Densetsu no Starfy (Note: Japanese: 伝説のスタフィー, Hepburn: Densetsu no Sutafī lit. "The Legendary Starfy") is a manga series produced by Shogakukan and Nintendo. It is based on The Legendary Starfy video game series, specifically the first and second titles in the series. It was serialized in the Shogakukan magazine CoroCoro Comic from its June 2002 issue to its October 2005 issue. Two tankōbon (bound volumes) collecting the individual chapters were released on October 28, 2003, and September 28, 2005.

The manga series later got a sequel titled Densetsu no Starfy R (Note: Japanese: 伝説のスタフィーR, Hepburn: Densetsu no Sutafī R lit. "The Legendary Stafy R"). It is based on the same video game series as Densetsu no Starfy, specifically Densetsu no Starfy 4. This manga is also titled Densetsu no Starfy Returns. (Note: Japanese: デンセツノスタフィーリターンズ, Hepburn: Densetsu no Sutafī Ritānzu lit. "The Legendary Stafy Returns") It was serialized in CoroCoro Comic from its April 2006 issue to April 2008 issue. A single volume was released on July 28, 2008.

== Other appearances in media ==
While only one of The Legendary Starfy games has been released outside Japan, some references to the series have appeared in a few games that were released internationally. In Mario & Luigi: Superstar Saga for the Game Boy Advance, a poster in the Yoshi Theater resembles the box art of the first game in the series also for the Game Boy Advance, but titled in English as "Legend of Stafy". In Super Princess Peach for the Nintendo DS, an enemy called "Starfish" resembles the Starfy sprites of Densetsu no Starfy 4, as well as The Legendary Starfy, but with sunglasses. In the Japanese version of Donkey Konga, one of the songs is the main theme song of the series. Starfy appears in the Super Smash Bros. series as a summonable Assist Trophy character, once again under the name "Stafy", appearing in every entry beginning with Super Smash Bros. Brawl. He attacks by using his signature spin attack against the opponents of whoever summoned him, but unlike most, he can be attacked and defeated. A costume based on Starfy can also be unlocked in Super Mario Maker.
