= The Legend of Kage =

1985 video game

- Japanese arcade flyer
- Developer: Taito (Note: Amstrad CPC, Commodore 64, and ZX Spectrum versions developed by Imagine Software.)
- Publishers: Taito; C64, CPC, ZX Spectrum; Imagine Software
- Composer: Hisayoshi Ogura
- Platforms: Arcade, NES, MSX, Commodore 64, Amstrad CPC, X1, ZX Spectrum
- Release: October 1985: Arcade; JP: October 1985; EU: Late 1985; NA: January 1986 NES; JP: April 18, 1986; NA: August 1987 MSX; JP: 1986 C64; EU: December 1986; NA: 1987 CPC; 1986
- Genres: Hack and slash, platform
- Mode: Single-player

The Legend of Kage (Note: Japanese: 影の伝説, Hepburn: Kage no Densetsu) is a 1985 hack and slash platform game developed and published by Taito for arcades. The player controls the ninja Kage, with the objective being to get through five stages in order to save the princess Kirihime. These stages are littered with enemies in the form of ninjas and monks, but Kage has various skills and weapons on his hands in order to get through them.

The arcade release was considered a success for Taito, and exceeded sales expectations at the time of its release. It has been ported to a variety of home systems, has had sequels and spinoffs, and has been featured on various Taito compilations.

== Gameplay ==
Arcade screenshot

The player takes the role of a young Iga ninja named Kage ("Shadow"), on a mission to rescue Princess Kiri (hime) - the Shogun's daughter - from the villainous warlord Yoshi (ro Kuyigusa) and fellow evil samurai Yuki (nosuke Riko). The player is armed with a kodachi shortsword and an unlimited number of shuriken. Kage must fight his way through, a forest, a secret passageway, up a fortress wall, inside the fortress where the princess is held, and then back in the forest after leaping off the fortress roof with the princess, which is where you must face a boss. The player must go through this cycle twice (thrice in the FC/NES version), with the first boss being Yuki and the second being Yoshi, in order to see the ending where you properly save Kiri.

Cycles repeat after five stages are completed, and play continues until all lives are gone, which ends the game.

With each cycle, the seasons change from summer to fall to winter and back to summer. The FC/NES has you go though all three seasons before seeing the ending unlike the arcade version where you can only see winter via the next loop.

In home versions, grabbing a crystal ball causes the player's clothes to change to the next level in color and thereby attain certain powers (bigger shuriken or faster speed). If Kage is hit in a home version while in green or orange clothes, he does not die but reverts to his normal red clothes. The FC/NES version also adds a boss preceding Yuki, in the form of Genbō, the twin monks.

== Development and release ==
The Legend of Kage was released by Taito in Japan in 1985, with a European release later in the year, and an American release in January 1986.

According to Hisayoshi Ogura, the game's composer, development came after a fast-paced period of game development within Taito, where it eased up around this game. Ogura specifically gave the game's music a distinct Japanese feeling in order for it to fit in better with the setting of the game, and he felt it was a worthy challenge for him to be able to adapt it to the sound hardware. Earlier versions of the game used a sound board based around the MSM5232, the same chip found on synths such as the Korg Poly-800, but an FM version of the soundtrack was also produced given Ogura's experimentation with FM sound at the time. This proved to be helpful as the final version of the game used an FM sound board. The game was almost shelved, but after it was placed in a game show, it was highly praised and Taito decided to give the game a full release due to the positive reception.

== Reception ==
Game Machine of Japan listed The Legend of Kage as the most successful table arcade unit of November 1985. According to Ogura, there were around 6,000 kits of the game sold, and this was considered a success within the company.

The Commodore 64 port received a mixed review from Commodore User magazine, criticizing the graphics, sound, controls and price, scoring it 5 out of 10. The magazine also said Legend of Kage was heavily influenced by Konami's beat 'em up game Shao-lin's Road, released earlier the same year. The NES/Famicom port of the game received negative feedback.

== Legacy ==
=== Re-releases ===
The Famicom/NES version was re-released on the Wii Virtual Console in Japan on December 19, 2006, and the United States on February 19, 2007. It was also released for the Virtual Console on Nintendo 3DS and Wii U in Japan in 2014.

The arcade version appeared in the Japan-only compilation title Taito Memories Gekan for the PlayStation 2 in 2005. It also appeared in Western-only compilation title Taito Legends 2 for the PlayStation 2, Xbox, and Microsoft Windows in select PAL regions in 2006, with the PlayStation 2 version exclusively available in North America in 2007.

A 3D remake of the arcade game along with the original arcade version is included in the 2006 compilation Taito Legends Power Up for the PlayStation Portable. The game is still side-scrolling.

The Revised Legend of Kage was included in the Taito Nostalgia 1 release along with the original game. It features two new playable characters, Ayame and Ganin. Ayame is a ninja who can throw bombs similar to the red ninja in the game and has an unlimited supply of throwing knives. Ganin is a dog who can breathe fire similar to the monks in the game and can perform a spin attack that does not have much range but leaves him invulnerable for an instant and kills any enemy that touches him. There is also a new final boss that all the characters face which is a giant green cobra that slithers on the ground back and forth on the screen at the end of each second run through the levels. It is the only enemy that does not jump into the air.

Hamster Corporation released the game as part of their Arcade Archives series for the PlayStation 4 in 2015 and Nintendo Switch in 2019, as well as their Console Archives series for the Nintendo Switch 2 and PlayStation 5 in June 2026.

=== Sequel ===
A follow-up game was developed by Lancarse for the Nintendo DS, and published by Taito in 2008. Taito's parent company, Square Enix, published a North American localization of the game later that year.

== See also ==
- Ninja Hayate (Taito, 1984) follows a young ninja (who even looks like Kage) attempting to rescue a kidnapped princess.
- Demon Sword (Taito, 1989) has similar gameplay to The Legend of Kage.
