= Super Bases Loaded 3 =

1994 video game

Super Bases Loaded 3: License to Steal
- North American cover art
- Developer(s): Tose
- Publisher(s): Jaleco
- Composer(s): Shibikkun; Akihito Suita; Shigemitsu Goto
- Series: Bases Loaded
- Platform(s): Super NES
- Release: JP: December 23, 1994; NA: February 1995
- Genre(s): Traditional baseball simulation
- Mode(s): Single-player, multiplayer

Super Bases Loaded 3: License to Steal (known in Japan as Super Moero!! Pro Yakyuu) is a Super Nintendo Entertainment System baseball game. It is the seventh overall installment of the Bases Loaded series, and the third installment of the secondary series for the Super NES. Super Bases Loaded 3 was licensed by the Major League Baseball Players Association (MLBPA) and uses real MLB players (the first game in the Bases Loaded series to use actual player names), but it was not licensed by Major League Baseball itself (MLB); all stats and attributes reflected the 1994 MLB season. All 28 U.S. cities that had an MLB team at the time are listed but team names and logos are not given. No real stadiums are used and the World Series is renamed the championship tournament.

Notable baseball players in the game include Barry Bonds, Kirby Puckett, and Tony Gwynn.

== Reception ==
GamePro gave Super Bases Loaded 3 a generally positive review, particularly praising the ability to automate almost any aspect of the game, the generally high level of customization, and the strong graphics.

Next Generation reviewed the SNES version of the game, rating it two stars out of five, and stated that "it's clear with this latest installment that the series is beginning to creak under its own weight".
