= Chubby Cherub =

1985 video game based on Obake no Q-Tarō

- North American cover art
- Developer: Tose
- Publisher: Bandai
- Platform: Nintendo Entertainment System
- Release: JP: December 16, 1985; NA: October 1986
- Genre: Action
- Mode: Single-player

Chubby Cherub (known in Japan as Obake no Q-Tarō: WanWan Panic (オバケのQ太郎 ワンワンパニック, Obake no Q-Tarō WanWan Panikku; lit. 'Q-Tarō the Ghost: BowWow Panic')) is an action video game developed by Tose and published by Bandai for the Nintendo Entertainment System. It is about a flying cupid-like character who attacks enemies with hearts. It is one of the first third-party games developed for the Nintendo Entertainment System in North America.

The original Japanese version of the game is based on Obake no Q-Tarō, a manga series by Fujiko Fujio. It was retitled and modified for its North American release since its source material was relatively unknown outside Japan.

== Plot ==
Chubby Cherub's friends are kidnapped by several burglars. Chubby Cherub has to save them, however many dogs are in the way. Chubby Cherub has to cross 12 levels, and at the end of each, the protagonist finds his friends. Eating food maintains Chubby Cherub's flight. If the flying meter goes all the way down, the character has to stay on the ground. The character must shoot hearts at the dogs before they bark at the character; if a bark hits the character, the character may die.

There are hell and heaven stages. When Chubby Cherub goes down to the stage where it has open downsides, he goes to hell. It is a dark stage, so he cannot see any floors and cannot fly. When Chubby Cherub touched a dog, he reacts like a misfit but it repeats until he arrives to the exit. Heaven can be reached with a smoke ring when Chubby Cherub touches it by flying from below. Heaven has many cakes which are worth 500 points each. If Chubby Cherub eats foods every time from the right side since the beginning of the stage until he reaches heaven, the heaven stage scrolls and Chubby Cherub warps to beyond the stage according to the distance of the scrolled part of heaven.

== Characters ==
=== Chubby Cherub/Q-Tarō the Ghost ===
Q-Tarō the Ghost is the main character in the Japanese version of the game, and Chubby Cherub is the main character in the English version. They can both fly through the air or walk on the ground. Flying uses the power meter more quickly. If the power meter runs out, the player has to walk on foot. Lollipops give Chubby Cherub/Q-Tarō the ability to fire four shots at the dogs. Other foods replenish the meter.

=== Beagles ===
Beagles are one of the main enemies in the game. Beagles can jump around onto ledges and fences. Some are assigned to one place and just jump in two spots. Others can bark at the player, releasing an icon that must be avoided. It is noted that the barks move with the screen. If coming from the back, they are very dangerous.

=== Bulldogs ===
Bulldogs are much bigger than beagles. They do not move as fast, and bark much more. Bulldogs are perched much higher off the ground. Bulldogs are just as dangerous when they bark from behind the player's character.

=== Cats ===
Cats are less of a threat than the other enemies, although they are impossible to get rid of. All Cats are immune to the player's attacks and come in a shade of brown and pink.

== Reception ==
Sean "Seanbaby" Reiley reviewed Chubby Cherub and stated that, in his opinion, it was the fifteenth worst NES game of all time. Sean Reiley described Chubby Cherub's graphics as ugly and also said that "the cartridge is a waste of plastic, and could be used in many other things."

== See also ==
- Dragon Power
- Ninja Kid
