= Bases Loaded II: Second Season =

1988 video game

- North American cover art
- Developer: Tose
- Publisher: Jaleco
- Composer: "Sonoda"
- Platform: Nintendo Entertainment System
- Release: JP: August 10, 1988; NA: January 1990
- Genre: Sports game
- Modes: Single-player, multiplayer

Bases Loaded II: Second Season, known in Japan as Moero!! Pro Yakyū '88 Kettei Ban (燃えろ!!プロ野球’88決定版, Burn!! Pro Baseball '88 Decision Version), is a baseball video game developed by Tose and released by Jaleco for the Nintendo Entertainment System in 1988 in Japan, and in 1990 in North America. It is the sequel to Bases Loaded and is later followed by Bases Loaded 3. The game is the second installment in the Bases Loaded series. The game was novelized by Peter Lerangis, as part of the Worlds of Power series published by Scholastic Books.

== Gameplay ==
Like its predecessor, Bases Loaded II offers both a single-game mode and a single- player "pennant race" mode. In the "pennant race", a player must first achieve at least a 75-55 record during the regular season, then win a best-of-7 "World Series" against L.A. or N.Y. depending whether you have chosen a team from the Eastern or Western league respectively.

Though some characteristics remained the same between Bases Loaded and Bases Loaded II (e.g. the same fictitious 12-team league returns in this game, with new players. All of the players on the Washington, D.C. team are named after famous politicians, while all of Los Angeles's players take their names from Hollywood luminaries. In addition, one of Hawaii's pitchers is named Ho.), there are several noteworthy changes. One new feature was the "biorhythm" concept; players in the game had "biorhythms" that could be monitored to ensure optimal performance. Bases Loaded II had a little faster play action than the original game, and the point of view once a ball was hit into play was also different. In Bases Loaded, the view was from behind home plate, whereas in Bases Loaded II the view was either from the first-base line if the home team was at bat, or from the third-base line if the visiting team was at bat.

One big improvement over the original Bases Loaded included the ability to modify the starting lineup and batting order for the user controlled team, and clearly defined pitcher's roles which were outlined clearly in the detailed rosters included with the instructional manual.

One other feature largely unique to this particular game was the concept of a mandatory called game via an unconventional "9-run rule," provided that game had completed at least the top half of the fifth inning, and the home team had completed its time at bat in any inning in which it was trailing. Also, like in Nippon Professional Baseball, no game was allowed to last more than 12 innings.

== Release ==
Bases Loaded II was re-released to PS5 and Nintendo Switch in 2026 as part of the Jaleco Sports series, with porting and development by Sickhead Games and publishing by Rock It Games. The release included Bases Loaded II: Second Season for NES, Super Bases Loaded 2 for SNES, Super 3D Baseball for Super Famicom, Moero!! Pro Yakyuu '88 Ketteiban for Famicom, and Hanguk Pro Yagu for Super Comboy, with original manuals and box art viewable from inside the game in multiple languages and regions.

== Reception ==
Reception

Review scores
| Publication | Score |
|---|---|
| AllGame | 4/5 |
| Electronic Gaming Monthly | 7/10, 7/10, 5/10, 5/10 |

Allgame gave Bases Loaded II four out of five stars.
