= Dragon Ball Z: Idainaru Son Goku Densetsu =

1994 video game

- Developer: BEC
- Publisher: Bandai
- Director: Tokuji Komine
- Producer: Makoto Asanuma
- Designer: Hisayasu Suzuki
- Programmers: Hisayasu Suzuki; Junichi Kawai; Kunihiko Shimizu
- Artist: Muneshige Ikeshita
- Composer: Koichi Shimamura
- Series: Dragon Ball
- Platform: PC Engine Super CD-ROM²
- Release: JP: November 11, 1994
- Genre: Fighting
- Mode: Single-player

Dragon Ball Z: Idainaru Son Goku Densetsu (Note: Japanese: ドラゴンボールZ: 偉大なる孫悟空伝説, Hepburn: Doragon Bōru Z: Idainaru Son Gokū Densetsu; lit. "Dragon Ball Z: Great Son Goku Legend") is a 1994 fighting video game developed by BEC and published by Bandai for the PC Engine Super CD-ROM² add-on. Based upon Akira Toriyama's Dragon Ball franchise, it is a retelling of Goku's seven major battles over the course of the series up to the conclusion of the Cell Games saga. Idainaru Son Goku Densetsu was created by most of the same team at BEC that would go on to work on Dragon Ball Z: Idainaru Dragon Ball Densetsu. The game received generally positive reception from critics who reviewed it as an import title but criticism was geared towards its difficulty level.

== Gameplay ==
Gameplay screenshot showcasing Goku and Tao Pai Pai in a fight.

Dragon Ball Z: Idainaru Son Goku Densetsu is a fighting game similar to the Super Butōden sub-series on SNES and Buyū Retsuden on Sega Mega Drive, which retells seven major encounters Goku had over the course of the Dragon Ball series up to the conclusion of the Cell Games saga such as fighting with the assassin Tao Pai Pai, facing Tien Shinhan and Piccolo Jr. at the Tenkaichi Budōkai, destroying Piccolo Daimaō, protecting Earth from Vegeta, saving Namek from Frieza and sacrificing his life against Cell.

The plot is told through cinematics by Gohan and other characters to Goten, whose father died prior to his birth and players have the choice to select any of the stories and face the enemy. Fights in the game are split into two formats: a Street Fighter II-esque format using a four-tier battle plane reminiscent of Fatal Fury where players must charge an energy bar to activate a special attack against the opponent during another gameplay segment, where players choose the attack to perform. During the fighting segment, players can perform actions such as block incoming attacks and shoot a projectile.

== Development and release ==
Dragon Ball Z: Idainaru Son Goku Densetsu was created by most of the same team at BEC that would go on to work on Dragon Ball Z: Idainaru Dragon Ball Densetsu. Makoto Asanuma and Tokuji Komine heading the project as producer and director respectively. Hisayasu Suzuki serving as game system designer and also acted as programmer alongside Junichi Kawai and Kunihiko Shimizu. Muneshige Ikeshita, Toshihiro Uchibori and Yoshihiro Nakagawachi were responsible for the pixel art, among other people collaborating in the visual department. The PSG music was composed by Koichi Shimamura. The title was published for the PC Engine Super CD-ROM² add-on by Bandai in Japan on November 11, 1994.

== Reception ==
Reception

Review scores
Publication	Score
Consoles +	95%
Famitsu	6/10, 7/10, 7/10, 6/10
Joypad	93%
Superjuegos	92/100
Dengeki PC Engine	86.25/100

Dragon Ball Z: Idainaru Son Goku Densetsu received positive reception from magazines such as Dengeki PC Engine and outlets who reviewed it as an import title. In a public poll taken by PC Engine Fan, the game received a score of 22.1 out of 30, indicating a popular following. The title sold approximately 40,000 copies during its lifetime in Japan.

Famitsu's four reviewers commended Dragon Ball Z: Idainaru Son Goku Densetsu for its visuals and use of the CD-ROM format but regarded it as inferior compared to the anime adaptation. Joypad's Grégoire Hellot praised the game's fast pacing, fusion between combat and interactive animation, as well as animated sequences for being faithful to the source material but criticized the controls for newcomers and high difficulty level. Consoles +' François Garnier and Maxime Roure also praised the title's presentation for being faithful to the series, graphics, fluid animations, audio design, longevity and playability. Superjuegos' Bruno Sol gave high remarks to the animated segments, four-tier playing arena, music, sound effects and gameplay but criticized its difficulty and language barrier. Sol later regarded it as one of the best Dragon Ball Z games alongside Super Butōden 2 and Idainaru Dragon Ball Densetsu.
