= Karaoke Studio =

1987 video game

- Karaoke Studio cover art
- Developer(s): Tose
- Publisher(s): Bandai
- Platform(s): Family Computer
- Release: JP: July 30, 1987
- Genre(s): Music Game
- Mode(s): Single-player

Karaoke Studio (Japanese: カラオケスタジオ, Hepburn: Karaoke Sutajio) is a karaoke music video game designed for Nintendo's Family Computer, or Famicom. The game is packaged with a hardware expansion subsystem designed to be inserted into the Famicom cartridge slot, and with a microphone peripheral capable of detecting a human voice.

== Gameplay ==
Several levels of the game can be played on the hardware expansion subsystem alone. Additionally, smaller expansion cartridges (originally available for separate purchase) providing additional levels and other new content can be plugged directly into the Karaoke Studio subsystem.

Gameplay consists of singing along in a karaoke-manner to a series of Japanese pop songs, which have been converted to the Famicom's synthetic audio format. The player is scored on accuracy of singing. As the music plays, the screen displays the song's lyrics upon a graphical depiction of the song's themes.

Several expansion cartridges were progressively released providing new songs not contained on the original subsystem. These expansion cartridges are smaller in size and plug directly into the Karaoke Studio subsystem.

- Karaoke Studio Senyou Cassette Vol. 1 (Bandai), Oct 28, 1987
- Karaoke Studio Senyou Cassette Vol. 2 (Bandai), Feb 18, 1988

== See also ==
- Karaoke Revolution
- SingStar
