= Densetsu no Starfy 4 =

2006 video game

- Developer: Tose
- Publisher: Nintendo
- Director: Azusa Tajima
- Producers: Yasuhiro Minamimoto; Hitoshi Yamagami
- Designer: Koutarou Shinoki
- Programmers: Satoshi Nakajima; Kouichi Kitano
- Artists: Kazuya Yoshioka; Keisuke Ookuba; Nanako Kinoshita
- Writer: Akio Imai
- Composer: Morihiro Iwamoto
- Platform: Nintendo DS
- Release: JP: April 13, 2006
- Genre: Platform
- Mode: Single-player

Densetsu no Starfy 4 (Note: Japanese: 伝説のスタフィー4, Hepburn: Densetsu no Sutafī Fō lit. The Legend of Starfy 4) is a 2006 platform video game developed by Tose and published by Nintendo for the Nintendo DS. It is the fourth game in The Legendary Starfy series. As with the other games in the series, Densetsu no Starfy 4 features Stafy, known as Starfy in Western regions, as the main character. He is joined by his sister Starly and his friend Moe the clam. The three of them help out other undersea creatures and fights numerous villains. It was followed by a sequel, The Legendary Starfy.

== Plot ==
While Starfy and his family sleep in the Pufftop Palace, a nearby land known as the Amy Kingdom is under attack. The heart-shaped Monamool Stone held there is stolen by an evil female snake named Degil. Mattel, a princess from Amy Castle, flees to seek Starfy's help. When Moe the clam sees Mattel and hears about her, he rushes toward Pufftop Palace, bursts inside the front door, and tells everyone that she would like to speak with them about the Amy Kingdom tragedy. Starfy dozes off, and Moe tells him to listen, then Starly pets Moe and talks to him about his love, Ruby the zebra turkeyfish, while Starfy sits and plays with his handheld game console that resembles the original Nintendo DS. Later, after their relaxation, Starfy, Starly and Moe go with Mattel to stop Degil and restore peace to the Amy Kingdom.

== Gameplay ==
Screenshot of Densetsu no Starfy 4

Gameplay in Densetsu no Starfy 4 is quite similar to the previous games in the series. New features were added in this game that make use of the Nintendo DS' advanced hardware. The visuals are still 2-D, albeit with completely redrawn sprites, while the backgrounds are 3-D. Densetsu no Starfy 4 takes advantage of the dual screens, using them to show both the main game and map of the level simultaneously, while it uses the touchscreen to play the bonus stages, scroll the map, interact in the title screen and navigate menus. Some costumes in the costume collections of Densetsu no Starfy 2 and Densetsu no Starfy 3 return in fully rendered 3-D, which allows the player to manipulate the 3D models of Starfy and Starly to see more of their costumes.

== Development ==
In order to give fans a chance to contribute to the development of Densetsu no Starfy 4, Nintendo and Tose created a costume contest, and gave fans a picture of Starfy (in PDF format) to print, color, and send in. A picture of Starfy in a rocket suit was shown to the Starfy fans as an example on how to color over the coloring picture. The winning costumes also appear on the official Densetsu no Starfy 4 website. Most other artworks were featured in the first credits sequence of Densetsu no Starfy 4.

== Reception ==
Densetsu no Starfy 4 was the fourth best-selling game in Japan during its week of release at 47,971 copies. Japanese sales totalled 167,136 copies during 2006. Famitsu scored the game a 33 out of 40 based on the opinions of four reviewers.
