= Ninja Kid =

1986 video game

- North American cover art
- Developer: Tose
- Publisher: Bandai
- Series: GeGeGe no Kitarō
- Platform: Nintendo Entertainment System
- Release: JP: April 17, 1986; NA: October 1986
- Genres: Action, platform
- Mode: Single-player

Ninja Kid, known in Japan as GeGeGe no Kitaro - Yōkai Daimakyō (ゲゲゲの鬼太郎 妖怪大魔境; GeGeGe no Kitaro: The Evil Yōkai Realm), is an action video game developed by Tose and published by Bandai for the Nintendo Entertainment System.

The Japanese version was based on the 1985 television series GeGeGe no Kitarō itself based on the manga series of the same name, but the game was changed to the generic "Ninja Kid" and all references to Kitaro were removed for the American version due to the source material being not well-known outside Japan.

This game was followed by a sequel titled Gegege no Kitarou 2: Youkai Gundan no Chousen (ゲゲゲの鬼太郎2 妖怪軍団の挑戦), which was released the following year only in Japan also by Bandai; however, that title was a role-playing video game and its plot is unrelated to the original.

It was the eighth best-selling Famicom game of 1986, selling 1,250,000 copies.

== Gameplay ==
Gameplay begins on an overhead map with several different arches. Each arch leads to a different side-scrolling mission, and the type of the mission could be determined by the shape of the arch. At the end of each mission, two doors will appear, one of which would return to the map, and the other of which will take players to a vertically scrolling tower with a mini-boss at the top (after defeating the mini-boss they are returned to the map). Also during each mission, items randomly appear on the screen. Some bonus items also give a temporary speed boost, or an owl that shows players which door leads back to the map (instead of the mini-boss tower). Once a scroll has been collected, it can be taken to the hut in the middle of the map to unlock the fortress and fight the map's boss. During the boss fight, if any whistles have been collected, the character can crouch in the far left corner of the screen to use a whistle to summon a familiar.

== Ninja Kid / GeGeGe no Kitaro - Youkai Dai Makyou ==
The original Japanese version is notably different from the American version. The main character is Kitarō, and his main weapon is his hair rather than darts. His sub-weapons are a flying finger instead of shuriken, his vest instead of the feather, and a geta instead of a boomerang. All of these weapons function the same as the ones of the protagonist of the American version, Kyo; they just use different sprites. The fireball sub-weapon remains the same. Certain levels are inhabited by "western" film monsters like Frankenstein's Monster and Count Dracula; the boss of these levels is the character Back Beard, the leader of the "western youkai". The scroll which unlocks the fortress is a crystal ball in the original version. The familiars are also different, being characters from the manga: the Pegasus was originally Nurikabe, the Eagle was Konaki Jiji, and the Mirror was Sunakake Babaa. Finally, a few of the minor enemies are different; most notably the "Pirate Ninja" found in some of the Guerilla Warfare levels was originally Nezumi Otoko, and Kitaro rides on Ittan Momen during the Dog Fight levels.

== See also ==
- Chubby Cherub
