= Densetsu no Starfy (video game) =

2002 video game

- Box art
- Developer: Tose
- Publisher: Nintendo
- Directors: Yasuhiro Minamimoto; Hitoshi Yamagami
- Producers: Takehiro Izushi; Shin Kondo
- Designers: Kotaro Shinoki; Eiko Haruki; Daisuke Nomura; Hiromine Okura
- Programmers: Hiroshi Okuda; Takahiro Furukawa; Tappei Nakano; Satoshi Nakajima
- Artist: Masao Kusakabe
- Composers: Yoko Matsutani; Morihiro Iwamoto
- Platform: Game Boy Advance
- Release: JP: September 6, 2002
- Genre: Platform
- Mode: Single-player

Densetsu no Starfy (Note: Japanese: 伝説のスタフィー, Hepburn: Densetsu no Sutafī lit. The Legendary Starfy) is a 2002 platform video game developed by Tose and published by Nintendo for the Game Boy Advance. It was released in Japan on September 6, 2002. It is the first game in The Legendary Starfy series. It received its re-release on the Nintendo Classics service on July 12, 2024, in all regions for the first time along with its sequels. It was followed by Densetsu no Starfy 2 in 2003.

== Plot ==
In Pufftop Palace, prince Starfy accidentally drops the Magic Jar, falling into the ocean. In the jar, an evil entity named Ogura escapes and summons tornadoes towards Starfy, where he falls in the ocean. He is rescued by Old Man Lobber and discovers Ogura has set chaos through the ocean. Determined to stop Ogura and return home, Starfy follows his trail, befriending a clam named Moe along the way.

Reaching an underwater temple, Starfy discovers that a prohecy may help him bring peace to the ocean. However, Ogura steals it and runs to Pufftop. Following him, Starfy defeats Ogura and imprsions him in the jar, bringing the ocean and Pufftop to peace.

== Gameplay ==
Starfy can run, jump, and attack via spinning; he also gains access to various transportation objects and animal familiars as the games progress. The game usually consists of multiple stages or worlds, with each stage split up into four sub-stages. Boss characters hide at the end of each world's final sub-stage. Most of the other sub-stages' goals are centered on retrieving a lost or stolen item for another character. The main task is to meet characters and find their missing items. There are many items to collect and many enemies to defeat. Players can move Starfy on land by running and jumping, but when Starfy is in watery areas, they can move him much more freely, make him push obstacles, and so on. The game also includes minigames, some of which are similar to Atari's Breakout series.

== Development ==
Screenshot of the cancelled Nintendo Game Boy Color prototype

Back in November 1995, Nintendo's producer Hitoshi Yamagami received a directive from Tose's producer, Yasuhiro Minamimoto, asking if Hitoshi could come up with a kind of floaty platformer, then started developing it. Six months of work later, Hitoshi thought of a floating character being pushed through a maze. They tried developing a balloon-lifting game, but Hitoshi and Yasuhiro were having difficulties moving the balloon toward wherever they wanted, making the project uninteresting and annoying in their opinions. Hitoshi asked if they could take control of the floating character as opposed to just pushing it around. As long as things were floating around, Hitoshi and Yasuhiro decided a water-based character would be a decent idea. They thought as far as a character that would fit that environment, perhaps a jellyfish or starfish would be a good character. They also changed direction on the project a bit, and it was then that the project went through a period of trouble, and it wasn't until March 1998 that the project began to come to fruition.

Later in 1998, Hitoshi and Yasuhiro were going through the process of changing over from the Game Boy to the Game Boy Color, so orders came down that Nintendo wanted Hitoshi and Yasuhiro to sort of revamp this prototype of the series to work on the Game Boy Color. Then Hitoshi and Yasuhiro had to go through and do that work, until 1999, as they were approaching the release of the game, Hitoshi and Yasuhiro were told by Nintendo that the Game Boy Advance would soon be released and turn the Game Boy Color into a handheld of the past, making everyone cancel their Game Boy Color software projects. Therefore, Hitoshi and Yasuhiro went through another period of reflection and began rethinking the game yet again. Several things, such as its official logo, artworks, and some names were changed for unknown reasons. The protagonist of the series, Starfy, was originally planned to be a starfish, but during the time of development, he went through changes to where he came down out of the sky, so one of the questions that Hitoshi is often asked is, "Is Starfy a starfish or a star?", and the company policy is to respond that he is neither. Hitoshi's response is simply, "Starfy is the Prince of Pufftop".

== Marketing ==
In order to make the game successful, Nintendo and Tose aired animated television commercials, as well as selling some promotional merchandise, such as a music album that includes a few songs sung by Becky. The animated television commercials contain the game's exposition, though it differs in some respects. For instance, in the game, Starfy was walking inside the Pufftop Palace while carrying some stuff (including the Magic Jar holding the antagonist, Ogura), until he trips and drops what he is carrying, causing the Magic Jar to fall into the ocean below the Pufftop Palace. In one of the commercials, however, Starfy was walking outside of Pufftop Palace while only carrying the Magic Jar, until he tripped and he fell in the ocean (along with the Magic Jar). Another television commercial shows Starfy sleeping on the whale seen in the game.

Despite being successful, it was released exclusively in Japan. Hitoshi Yamagami and Yasuhiro Minamimoto were unsure how it would be accepted by any gaming audience outside Japan. It was also stated by members of TOSE that they had long wanted to bring the game and its successors outside Japan, but Nintendo of America had always thought the games were full of too many Japanese cultural references for an international release. The game was planned to be released in China on the iQue Game Boy Advance system in 2006 but never materialized.

== Reception ==
On release, Famitsu magazine scored the game a 30 out of 40, and by the end of 2002 Densetsu no Starfy had sold a total of 291,616 copies in Japan.
