= Moero!! Jūdō Warriors =

1990 video game

- Developer: Jaleco
- Publisher: Jaleco
- Platform: Family Computer
- Release: JP: June 29, 1990
- Genre: 2D fighting
- Modes: Single-player, multiplayer

Moero!! Jūdō Warriors (燃えろ!!柔道WARRIORS) is a Family Computer video game that was released in 1990.

== Gameplay ==
The players are competitors in an international judo tournament, with the box art including flags of the Soviet Union, France, Brazil, the United States, and Japan. Players must travel around the world in search of judo opponents, and after defeating five opponents they are able to compete in the Summer Olympic Games. Players must defeat nine opponents in the Olympic Games to collect the gold medal; while losing some matches they could still win the silver or the bronze medal.
