= Goal! (video game) =

1988 video game

- North American NES box art
- Developer: Tose
- Publisher: Jaleco
- Platforms: NES, Game Boy
- Release: NES: JP: December 23, 1988; NA: October 1989
- Genre: Sports (soccer)
- Modes: Single-player, multiplayer

Goal! is a 1988 soccer/football video game published by Jaleco for the Nintendo Entertainment System. The game supports up to two players. It was released in Japan as Moero !! Pro Soccer (燃えろ!! プロサッカー, lit. "Burn!! Pro Soccer").

== Gameplay ==
The game has five modes: World Cup, Tournament, League, Shoot Competition, Asian Cup and Vs. Mode. The object of the game is the same as in real football: one team must score more goals than the other to win.

When playing World Cup League or Tournament mode Asian mode with two players, the players can either play on the same team or against each other.

Jaleco followed the game with several sequels and localizations, including Goal! Two for the NES (titled Goal! in the North American SNES version, and retitled Super Goal! for the European release), and Super Goal! 2. In 1993, Jaleco published Tose's Game Boy port of Goal!, which Tose adapted from their Japanese Game Boy release J-Cup Soccer.

== Release ==
GOAL! was re-released to Steam, PS5, and Nintendo Switch in 2025 as part of the Jaleco Sports series, with porting and development by Sickhead Games and publishing by Rock It Games. The release included GOAL! for NES, Super GOAL! for SNES, Moero!! ProSoccer for Famicom, and Super Cup Soccer for Super Famicom, with original manuals and box art viewable from inside the game in multiple languages and regions.
