= Goal! (1992 video game) =

1992 video game

- North American cover art
- Developer: Tose
- Publisher: Jaleco
- Platforms: Super Nintendo Entertainment System, Nintendo Entertainment System
- Release: JP: April 24, 1992; NA: December 1992; EU: 1992; NES: JP: September 25, 1992; NA: November 1992; EU: 1992
- Genre: Sports
- Modes: Single-player, multiplayer

Goal!, released in Japan as Super Cup Soccer (Note: Japanese: スーパーカップサッカー, Hepburn: Sūpā Kappu Sakkā) and Europe as Super Goal!, is a 1992 association football video game developed by Tose and published by Jaleco for the Super Nintendo Entertainment System. Goal! Two is Tose's first sequel to 1988's Goal! (released in Japan as Moero !! Pro Soccer). It was later ported to the Nintendo Entertainment System as Goal!!, with the game being titled Goal! Two in North America and Goal! 2 in Europe.

For the French release of the NES version, Jaleco secured an endorsement from French international footballer Eric Cantona, who had just transferred to Manchester United F.C. The French packaging bears the name and likeness of Cantona, with the prefixed title Eric Cantona Football Challenge: Goal! 2. It is otherwise unrelated to Eric Cantona Football Challenge, which is a port of Striker from Rage Software in 1992.

Jaleco followed Goal! with Super Goal! 2 (1994). An additional Super Famicom installment, Takeda Nobuhiro no Super League Soccer (1994) was released only in Japan.

== Gameplay ==
Players choose a national men's team from a list of 25 countries (a net increase of eight compared with Goal! for NES). Like Goal! for NES, Goal! Two is not endorsed by any football team or federation, so kit colors are inauthentic.

In addition to a "Super Cup" tournament mode, the game allows for exhibition matches for a single-player, or for two players playing either competitively or cooperatively. Whereas Goal! for NES has a shoot-out mode, Goal! Two and Super Goal! do not.

In this sequel, Tose made several presentational changes: They adjusted the perspective of the football pitch; increased the size of the football player sprites and goals; enlivened the interstitial animation; and improved the game music and sound effects.

Among the functional changes to the game are a choice of team formations and the ability to choose the team's 11 members from a roster of 15.

== See also ==
- Internationalization and localization
- List of Nintendo Entertainment System games
- List of Super Nintendo Entertainment System games
