= Dragon Ball Z: Ultimate Battle 22 =

1995 video game

- Developer: Tose
- Publishers: JP/EU: Bandai; NA/AU: Infogrames
- Director: Ichisuke Hiten
- Producer: Kazumasa Ogata
- Designers: Aiko Nakatsuka; Haruse Kataoka; Jiro Inoue
- Programmer: Shinzo Tokiwa
- Artists: Aka Yasuda; Atsushi Fujimoto
- Composer: Kenji Yamamoto
- Series: Dragon Ball Z
- Platform: PlayStation
- Release: JP: 28 July 1995; EU: July 1996; AU: 14 March 2003; NA: 25 March 2003
- Genre: Fighting
- Modes: Single-player, multiplayer

Dragon Ball Z: Ultimate Battle 22 (Note: Japanese: ドラゴンボールZ: アルティメイトバトル22, Hepburn: Doragon Bōru Zetto: Arutimeito Batoru Towintetzū) is a 1995 fighting video game developed by Tose and published by Bandai and Infogrames for the PlayStation. Based upon Akira Toriyama's Dragon Ball franchise, its gameplay is similar to the Super Butōden sub-series, consisting of one-on-one fights with a main six-button configuration, featuring special moves, as well as five playable modes.

Announced early in 1995 as part of the Super Butōden sub-series before dropping the Butōden title, Ultimate Battle 22 shares the same character sprites and roster with another Dragon Ball Z fighting game developed by Tose for the Sega Saturn, Shin Butōden, released months later in November 1995. The game garnered a mixed reception from European critics but a negative response from North American critics. Reviewers criticized it for the slow gameplay, controls, lack of story mode and visuals, but some commended its extensive roster of 27 playable characters. The title sold approximately between 260,942 and 320,000 copies during its lifetime in Japan.

== Gameplay ==
A match between Vegeta and Goku.

Dragon Ball Z: Ultimate Battle 22 is a fighting game similar to the Super Butōden sub-series. Players fight against other characters in one-on-one matches, and the fighter who manages to deplete the opponent's health bar wins the bout and becomes the winner of the match. The game features five modes of play, a roster of 22 playable characters and their respective transformations with five additional characters being unlockable via cheat code. The title is notable for using actual cel drawings from the animators as character sprites and cutscenes before the fights, which were a novelty at the time of its original release in Japan but theses cutscenes were removed on the European and North American releases.

Ultimate Battle 22 uses a customizable six-button control scheme. Special moves are present in conventional format, with most commands consisting of button combinations. Characters can also dash back and forth by pressing L1 and R1 respectively. Players can also charge their Ki gauge by holding the X and square buttons to unleash a special attack. Unlike the Super Butōden entries and Buyū Retsuden, the split-screen mechanic was omitted, and both fighters are now shown in a single screen.

== Development and release ==
Dragon Ball Z: Ultimate Battle 22 was first announced early in 1995 under the working title Dragon Ball Z: Super Butōden PlayStation Version dropping the Butōden title. Ultimate Battle 22 shares the same character sprites and roster with another fighting game developed by Tose for the Sega Saturn called Dragon Ball Z: Shin Butōden, which was released months later in November 1995 and is regarded to be the better between the two games but never received a western release. The title was first released by Bandai in Japan on 28 July 1995 and later in Europe in select territories in July 1996. Prior to launch, an album was published exclusively in Japan by Forte Music Entertainment on 21 July 1995, featuring arranged songs scored by composer Kenji Yamamoto as well as a vocal duet of the closing theme by Hironobu Kageyama and Kuko. The initial Japanese release included a paper for the special "Special Data Memory Card" gift campaign "Dragon Suzuki", which was distributed to 200 people via lottery. It was re-released by Bandai in Japan as a budget title on 6 December 1996. Bandai Europe reissued the title in Europe on 4 October 2002 with Infogrames handling distribution. This was the first release of the game in most European territories. The game was also released in Australia on 14 March 2003. The game was officially released in North America by Infogrames on 25 March 2003.

== Reception ==
Reception

Aggregate scores
Aggregator	Score
GameRankings	32.03%
Metacritic	25/100

Review scores
Publication	Score
Consoles +	70%
Electronic Gaming Monthly	2/10, 1.5/10, 2/10
Famitsu	7/10, 5/10, 6/10, 6/10
Game Informer	5/10
GameSpot	1.2/10
GameZone	3.5/5
Jeuxvideo.com	9/20
Joypad	86%
Next Generation	2/5
Player One	79%
Dengeki PlayStation	60/100, 65/100, 70/100, 70/100
GameNOW	D−
Ultra Player	4/6

Dragon Ball Z: Ultimate Battle 22 received "generally unfavorable" reviews according to Metacritic, holding a 32.03% rating on review aggregator site GameRankings. This is due to the fact that the game launched in North America in 2003, thus appearing much duller when compared to contemporary PlayStation 2 releases such as Tekken 4. The title was criticized for its slow gameplay, controls, lack of story mode and visuals but some commended its large roster of 27 playable characters.

Consoles Plus' Maxime Roure and Killer praised the animated visual presentation, audio and large character roster but both reviewers stated that this aspect was not enough to be a good game based on the Dragon Ball license, criticizing the lack of innovation. Electronic Gaming Monthly's three reviewers heavily criticized the slow gameplay, poor visuals, unresponsive special moves and unbalanced fighting system, claiming that "someone deposited excrement in a jewelry box and made it look like a game." GameSpot's Ryan Davis called it a "really, really terrible game." GameZone's Michael Knutson stated in his review that "This game never should have come out in America." Knutson criticized the lack of a story mode, gameplay, unresponsive controls and overall audiovisual presentation.

Jeuxvideo.com's Rroyd-Y criticized the lack of story mode, presentation and slow gameplay, stating that "Ultimate Battle 22 is one of those promising apps that disappoint from the first moments of play." Joypad's Grégoire Hellot praised the large character roster and pseudo-3D visual effects but felt mixed in regards to the sprite animations and criticized the slow gameplay and issues with collision detection. Next Generation reviewed the original Japanese release, criticizing the lack of innovation and sub-par graphics when compared to other fighting games, stating that "About the only thing this one has going for it is the vast selection of characters." Player One's Christophe Delpierre commended the graphics, animations, audio and playability, stating that "Without being extraordinary, this DBZ brings together enough qualities to satisfy fans of the series. When you are told that love makes you blind..."

Famitsu reported that the title sold over 126,991 copies in its first week on the market. The game sold approximately between 260,942 and 320,000 copies during its lifetime in Japan. In the United States, it was the ninth best-selling home console video game in its first month of release, and was the 18th best-selling game the following month.
