= Bases Loaded 4 =

1991 video game

- North American cover art
- Developer: Tose
- Publisher: Jaleco
- Composer: Tatsuya Nishimura
- Platform: Nintendo Entertainment System
- Release: JP: November 22, 1991; NA: April 1993
- Genre: Sports (baseball)
- Modes: Single-player, Multiplayer

Bases Loaded 4, known in Japan as MoePro! Saikyō Hen (燃えプロ! 最強編, MoePro! Stronger Version), is a baseball video game developed by Tose and published by Jaleco for the Family Computer in Japan in 1991, as well as the Nintendo Entertainment System in North America in 1993. It is the fourth installment in the Bases Loaded series for the NES.

== Summary ==
This video game was released in November 1991 in Japan and April 1993 in North America. The game is the fourth installment of the Bases Loaded series, and the last of the original NES series.

== Ending ==
When the player completes the game in the US version, they are treated to a one-screen ending. In the Japanese version, the player is treated to a credits screen which reveals the faces of five of the game designers (two designers, one composer, one programmer, one planner), along with their quotations in Japanese (except sound composer Tatsuya Nishimura, whose quotation is in broken English).
