= Densetsu no Starfy 2 =

2003 video game

- Box art
- Developer: Tose (Note: Produced and supervised by Nintendo SPD.)
- Publisher: Nintendo
- Directors: Akio Imai; Azusa Tajima
- Producers: Yasuhiro Minamimoto; Hitoshi Yamagami
- Designers: Satoko Tanaka; Tatsuhiro Takasago
- Programmer: Kenta Egami
- Artist: Kotaro Shinoki
- Composer: Morihiro Iwamoto
- Series: The Legendary Starfy
- Platform: Game Boy Advance
- Release: JP: September 5, 2003
- Genre: Platform
- Mode: Single-player

Densetsu no Starfy 2 (Note: Japanese: 伝説のスタフィー2, Hepburn: Densetsu no Sutafī 2 lit. The Legend of Starfy 2) is a 2003 platform video game developed by Tose and published by Nintendo for the Game Boy Advance in Japan on September 5, 2003. It is the second game in The Legendary Starfy series. It received its re-release on the Nintendo Classics service on July 12, 2024, in all regions for the first time along with its predecessor and sequels.

== Plot ==
Densetsu no Starfy 2 takes place shortly after its predecessor. Stafy, known as Starfy in Western regions, is now back at Pufftop Palace, playing with his friend Moe. The series' main antagonist, Ogura, imprisoned inside the Magic Jar, unleashes his children into the sky. Ogura's children cause a series of thunderstorms and earthquakes that shake Pufftop Palace, causing the Magic Jar to shatter and release Ogura. Ogura captures Starfy's mother and flies away with Starfy in hot pursuit. Both he and Moe fall from Pufftop Palace to the ocean below. The duo mount an attack against Ogura and his children during the journey back to Pufftop Palace. As in the previous game, Densetsu no Starfy, Starfy helps various people with all sorts of different troubles during the course of several levels, such as finding their missing items, defeating bothersome enemies, and so on. Starfy and company fight against Ogura and his 10 children to reseal Ogura in the Magic Jar.

== Gameplay ==
Starfy can run, jump, and attack via spinning; he also gains access to various transportation objects and animal familiars from the previous game in the series as the games progress. Unlike its predecessor, Densetsu no Starfy 2 usually has a certain number of stages per area, with each stage split up into four sub-stages. Ogura's children, as boss characters, hide at the end of each world's final stage. Most of the other stages' goals are centered around retrieving a lost or stolen item for another character. There are many items to collect and many enemies to defeat. Players can move Starfy on land by running and jumping, but when Starfy is in watery areas, Starfy can move more freely, push obstacles, and so on. Like its predecessor, this game also includes minigames, some of which are similar to Atari's Breakout series.

== Development ==
Nintendo and Tose moved on to develop Densetsu no Starfy 2, after the release of its predecessor. It took less than a year for Nintendo and Tose to develop and release it. Like its predecessor, Nintendo and Tose aired animated television commercials for Densetsu no Starfy 2, as well as releasing some promotional merchandise, such as a music album that includes songs sung by Kazuki Saya, all related to the game. Likewise with its predecessor, the game was planned to be released in China on the iQue Game Boy Advance system, but this release was cancelled due to high piracy. However, the Chinese translation was fully completed, and it can be played through emulation.

== Reception ==
Densetsu no Starfy 2 debuted on Japanese sales charts at number 4, climbing healthily to 298,967 copies sold by the end of 2003.
