= The Legendary Starfy (video game) =

2008 video game

- North American box art
- Developer: Tose
- Publisher: Nintendo
- Directors: Miki Fujii; Kazuki Yoshihara
- Producers: Yasuhiro Minamimoto; Hitoshi Yamagami
- Designer: Chiemi Taniguchi
- Programmers: Satoshi Nakajima; Hisatsugu Shiro; Kenta Egami
- Artists: Toki Kando; Harumi Mochizuki; Kazuya Yoshioka
- Writer: Akio Imai
- Composer: Morihiro Iwamoto
- Platform: Nintendo DS
- Release: JP: July 10, 2008; NA: June 8, 2009; AU: October 8, 2009
- Genre: Platform
- Modes: Single-player, multiplayer

The Legendary Starfy, known as Densetsu no Stafī: Taiketsu! Daīru Kaizokudan (Note: Japanese: 伝説のスタフィー たいけつ！ダイール海賊団; lit. "The Legendary Stafy: Confrontation! Dire Pirate Squad") in Japan, is a 2008 platform video game developed by Tose and published by Nintendo for the Nintendo DS handheld video game console. It is the fifth game in The Legendary Starfy video game series. On June 8, 2009, the game became the first in the series to be released outside Japan.

The Legendary Starfy received positive reviews for its presentation, story and amount of content, although it was met with criticism for its low difficulty.

== Plot ==
In Pufftop, Starfy is awakened after a rabbit named Bunston crashes in his room and loses his memory. The Terrible Trio, consisting of Ronk, Papes, and Snips, fails to kidnap Bunston after being defeated by Starfy. With Moe, they learn Bunston has fallen in the big ocean, and the pair falls into it. After being rescued from an octopus, Bunston recovers a shard and a small part of his memory, which involves escaping from the planet Bunnera. Seeking further answers, Bunston joins Starfy and Moe to collect the remaining crystals. Along the way, they are joined by the Mermaid, Old Man Lobber, and Starly, who became embroiled after saving Pufftop from The Terrible Trio's goons.

As Bunston recovers his memory, it is revealed that Bunston is the prince of Bunnera, a race from a distant planet whose inhabitants hold shape-shifting abilities, a power sought by the pirate Mashtooth, who hired The Terrible Trio to kidnap Bunston; using his spaceship to escape, the following attack resulted in the crash in Pufftop. With Bunnera in danger, Starfy accepts to help Bunston rescue his planet by restoring the spaceship, made from the crystals the group collected.

As their quest resumes, the group continuously thwarts The Terrible Trio's attacks, though the group cures them later on. Having enough of Mashtooth's abuse and realizing Starfy's kind-hearted nature, The Terrible Trio abandons Mashtooth. Arriving on Bunnera, Starfy confronts Mashtooth, who ends up defeated and transported to the moon. Bunnera is restored, and Bunston bids farewell to his new friends as they leave. The Terrible Trio confronts Starfy, but the encounter ends up peaceful. Starfy and Moe then return to Pufftop.

== Gameplay ==
The Legendary Starfy is an action-adventure two-dimensional platformer. Players mainly control Starfy (with Starly being the exception in unique levels), who has the ability to move and swim at will, and has his signature move, the "Star Spin", to attack enemies. Starfy has a life gauge, which once fully depleted, leads to a game over, where the player retries to the last saved progress. Described as a "sea platformer", levels mostly take place in underwater, though it features various segments out of water, which both restrict and allows unique abilities to be used. Abilities, which consists of moves and transformations, are learned by progressing the story. Bunston's transformations can also be enhanced by finding a required item hidden in levels. Other unique abilities include riding a mine cart or controlling the jump of a snowball. Other characters grant their help, with the Mermaid, which saves the game and grants information on the touch screen; Moe, who indicates nearby treasures chests or side quests; Bunston, who tracks the story's progress; and Old Man Lobber, who records the player's statistics.

Each level features secret rooms which may contains pearls, treasure chests, or side quests. Pearls are the game's currency and recovery items, while treasure chests are collectibles existing in two types: red or blue chests. Red chests contain notes, which reveal backstory from a character's perspective, or costumes, which can be worn in the pause menu and create unique outfits should the player combine two corresponding costumes. Blue chests contain an Heart Gem, which permanently increases Starfy's maximum of hit points when three are collected. Side quests are minigames in a level which unlocks a secret level.

New to this entry, the world map and treasure chests are available from the beginning; in the previous games, the world map and treasures where unlockable features after completing the game once. In the world map, the player can save their game at will and explore other modes which become available as the game progresses. These include a shop, where the player can use pearls to buy unique costumes, the game's audio library, or a boss trial. Minigames are also unlocked as the player progresses, and allow up to four players to play in competitive minigames relying on the touch screen. In normal levels, Starly can be controlled by a second player when allowed, or during a boss fight, and she uses unique abilities.

== Development ==
The Legendary Starfy is the first game in the series to be released outside Japan. Nintendo of America previously found games in the series to be "too Japanese" for a North American release. The joint decision by Nintendo and Tose to finally release the Starfy series abroad came about because the Nintendo DS was doing well in the market. Yurie Hattori, assistant director for the Starfy series states "it's a game that's really the result of all the great ideas we had in [Densetsu no Starfy] 1-4. This is a really accessible game and a great starting point to bring it to the US". Very few changes were made for the game's English adaptation. To promote the game, a launch event was held at the Nintendo World Store in New York City on July 11, 2009.

== Reception ==
=== Reviews ===
Reception

Aggregate scores
Aggregator	Score
GameRankings	79%
Metacritic	75/100

Review scores
Publication	Score
Famitsu	31/40
Game Informer	7/10
GamePro	3/5
IGN	8.9/10
Nintendo World Report	8.0/10

The Legendary Starfy has received generally positive reviews. Reviews have commented on the game's similarities to Kirby. Reviewers have applauded the size and depth of the world, and creative story telling presented to the player.

IGN Nintendo Team editor Mark Bozon expressed in his review that the game contains an "incredible amount" of activities, and can feel almost cluttered at times because of this. Game Informer's Matt Helgeson said in his review of the game that "[it] isn't mind-blowing, but it's certainly well crafted and bolstered by some genuinely funny writing". Both of the Game Informer staff who reviewed the game also found that the cooldown (character's dizziness) after performing Starfy's spin attack too many times was "annoying".

=== Sales ===
The Legendary Starfy debuted on the Japanese sales charts at number 3, selling 29,000 copies. It is the slowest debut for the series so far. Media Create sales data lists the game at having sold 126,428 copies in Japan by the end of 2008. Public sales information from Amazon.com suggests that The Legendary Starfy was the top-selling Nintendo DS game in North America during its week of release, temporarily beating out previous top-sellers on the platform such as Mario Kart DS and New Super Mario Bros. NPD Group reports that the game was the 19th best-selling game in North America during the months of June and July 2009.
