= Shin Moero!! Pro Yakyū =

1989 video game

- Moero 6!! Shin Moero!! Pro Yakyuu
- Developer: Jaleco
- Publisher: Jaleco
- Platform: Family Computer
- Release: JP: July 13, 1989
- Genre: Sports simulation
- Modes: Single-player, multiplayer

Shin Moero!! Pro Yakyū (新・燃えろ！！プロ野球; lit. "New Flame!! Pro Baseball") is a traditional baseball simulation video game released for the Family Computer in 1989 exclusively in Japan.

== Gameplay ==
This game is drastically different from the Japanese version of Bases Loaded II: The Second Season.

While the controls are nearly identical to Bases Loaded II, the camera angles are different for fielding. Graphics also look more realistic and more advanced due to the enhanced engine used to make this game. There are three statistics for the biorhythms: P-Physical, S-Sensitivity, and I-Intellectual. They affect the player in ways that can only be mentioned while playing him on the screen. Positive numbers indicate that the player is better at one of the statistics. Negative numbers mean the player is doing poorly at one of the statistics. Zero is considered to be critical and indicates the statistic is a breaking point. Regular abilities are boosted by positive numbers (in addition to playing above his usual skill level) while negative numbers mean that a player will not play up to his potential.

Each team has a letter of the Latin alphabet associated with their name. It is assumed that each letter of the alphabet corresponds to a certain Nippon Professional Baseball league team. There are two leagues: the Western League (whose coast is the Sea of Japan) and the Pacific League (which has their teams based around the Pacific Ocean coast of the east). Each league co-responds to one of Japan's two major coastlines.
