= Super Bases Loaded =

1991 video game

- North American cover art
- Developer: Tose
- Publisher: Jaleco
- Composer: Tatsuya Nishimura
- Platform: Super NES
- Release: JP: May 17, 1991; NA: September 1991
- Genre: Sports
- Modes: Single-player, multiplayer

Super Bases Loaded is a baseball video game produced by Jaleco for the Super Nintendo Entertainment System in 1991. It is the fifth overall installment of the Bases Loaded series, and first installment of the secondary series for the Super NES. This game was originally released in Japan under the title Super Professional Baseball (スーパープロフェッショナルベースボール).

The North American version includes a sponsorship from Ryne Sandberg, like Bases Loaded 3 for the NES.

== Professional teams ==
- Atlanta Amoebas
- Boston Buzzards
- Chicago Cyclops
- New York Mercs
- Philadelphia Hawks
- Washington Weasels
- Hawaii Islanders
- Kansas City Kings
- Los Angeles Lizards
- Seattle Storm
- Texas Tornados
- Utah Stars

The player can also edit their own team in this game.

== Reception ==
Reception

Review scores
Publication	Score
ACE	790/1000
Game Informer	8/10, 7.5/10, 6/10
Games-X	3/5
Raze	84/100
Super Play	55%
Game Zone	92/100
N-Force	85%
SNES Force	45%
Super Action	65%
The Super Famicom	78/100
Super Pro	36%

According to Famitsu, Super Bases Loaded sold 179,281 copies during its lifetime in Japan. The Japanese publication Micom BASIC Magazine ranked the game fourth in popularity in its August 1991 issue.

Super Bases Loaded received mixed reviews from critics. David Upchurch of ACE praised the gameplay but was critical of the graphics and sound. Ashley Summers of Raze considered the baseball players to be realistically drawn and animated, but wrote that the crowd "looks like mush". Summers praised the music, but criticized the "muffled and repetitive" dialogue. Chris Rice of N-Force praised the gameplay and sound effects, but concluded that it was a "good game let down by poor graphics and an unfinished look!".

== See also ==
- Super Professional Baseball II
