= Tose =

Japanese video game developer

Tose Co., Ltd.
- Native name: 株式会社トーセ
- Type: Public
- Traded as: TYO: 4728
- Industry: Video games
- Founded: November 1, 1979; 47 years ago
- Headquarters: Kyoto, Japan
- Key people: Shigeru Saito (chairman & CEO); Yasuhito Watanabe (president & COO)
- Products: The Legendary Starfy series Game & Watch Gallery series
- Number of employees: 592 (2026)
- Website: tose.co.jp

Tose Co., Ltd. (Note: Japanese: 株式会社トーセ, Hepburn: Kabushiki-gaisha Tōse) (also called Tose Software) is a Japanese video game developer based in Kyoto. It is mostly known for developing Nintendo's Game & Watch Gallery series, various Dragon Ball games, as well as contract work or assistance to other developers. Tose has developed or co-developed thousands of games since the company's inception in 1979, but is virtually never credited in the games themselves. It is considered the largest non-publishing game developer in the world.

Tose maintains a policy of having no creative input in the games it works on, going so far as to refuse to put the studio's name in the credits and employees using pseudonyms in its early days. As such, Tose has gained a reputation for being a "ghost developer." Representatives of the company have described it as a "ninja developer," because it works in the shadows, as well as the "unsung hero" of the video game industry. When talking to the press, representatives of the company ask not to be identified by name. Exceptions to this include Game & Watch Gallery 4 and The Legendary Starfy series, as Tose shares the copyright with Nintendo.

The company provides services for game design, plot design, sound composition, programming, and more. It also does non-games work, developing software for the web, mobile apps, pachinko machines, and even appliances, like refrigerators.

== History ==
Tose was established by Shigeru Saito in November 1979 in Higashiyama-ku, Kyoto, as an independent entity of his father's company Toa Seiko Co., Ltd. At the time, Toa Seiko had a contract to produce arcade cabinets for Space Invaders, but its other clients complained about being associated with the gaming industry. It began as an arcade cabinet manufacturer with only five employees. Its first game was the arcade game Sasuke vs. Commander for SNK in September 1980. It released Vanguard, a side-scrolling shooter, in March 1981. Vanguard II, a top-down sequel was made in three years later. By 1982, the company transitioned to software development. When the Famicom released in 1983, Tose was able to partner with Nintendo because it already had experience developing for the console's CPU. It worked with Taito to port Space Invaders to the console, and also worked on Kid Icarus, as well as the Dragon Ball video game series. By this point, Tose had built a reputation as a reliable development partner for third-party titles.

The company moved its head office to Otokuni-gun, Kyoto Prefecture in May 1986 and Saito was named president. Saito was named president of the company in February 1987. In July 1988, a new head office was completed in Yamazaki, Kyoto. In May 1990, Tose began developing software for the Game Boy and the Super Famicom. In 1993, Tose opened offices in Shanghai, China and Los Angeles, California. The US subsidiary dissolved soon after. During this time, the company began developing mobile games from NTT Docomo's i-mode.

In August 1999, Tose was listed on the Osaka Securities Exchange 2nd Section and the Kyoto Stock Exchange. In October of that year, Tose's Kyoto head office was opened at Shijo-Karasuma. In September 2000, Tose was listed on the Tokyo Stock Exchange 2nd Section. A second subsidiary based in China was established in Hangzhou in March 2001. In August, Tose was listed on the Tokyo Stock Exchange 1st Section and Osaka Securities Exchange 1st Section. A new office was opened in Shibuya-ku, Tokyo in September 2002.

Following six years of development, Tose partnered with Nintendo in 2002 to release Densetsu no Starfy for the Game Boy Advance. This was the company's first original IP. Tose re-entered the US market in March 2003 and was able to establish an office Westlake Village, California with just two employees. Saito was named CEO in September 2004. In October, the company established Phoenix Communications as a subsidiary in Tokyo to plan, develop, sell, and manage digital content for the web.

By 2006, 70% of Tose's clients were located in Japan, 15% in China, 10% in the U.S., and 5% Korea, Canada, and other regions. It had six studios across Japan, China, and the United States with 800 employees in Japan and 200 in China. On December 18, 2007, Tose announced the leakage of its business information onto the Internet, which was discovered the day before. The leak included 10 pieces of information relating to customer names, development cases, development contents, development fees, and reception time. By 2008, Tose had opened additional studios in Okinawa, Nagoya, and Sapporo, and expanded to 1,000 employees in Japan alone. After four installments of the Starfy series in Japan, 2009's The Legendary Starfy on the Nintendo DS was the first game to release in North America. Tose designed the game to be accessible for Western audiences.

By 2011, the company was producing 110-120 titles each year. On September 1, 2011, Tose announced the separation of its amusement machine development business from its second game development department (ゲーム事業部開発2部) into a separate amusement machine developer (AM開発部). By 2012, Tose had 12 offices across three countries. Business in the US market had been declining following the end of development for Wii and DS games. In order to diversify its efforts, Tose chose to publish its first game, Susume Tactics! for Sony's PSP. In June 2013, Tose dissolved its US subsidiary and opened an office in Manila, Philippines. In 2014, the company restructured its development teams. By 2015, the company had 400 employees in China and Philippines. Saito became chairman in 2015, while Yasuhito Watanabe was appointed as president and COO.

By 2023, video games accounted for 70% of the company's business, while the remaining 30% came from mobile content. In July 2024, the first three Starfy games were added to the Nintendo Classics collection as part of the Nintendo Switch Online + Expansion Pack subscription. It was reported that Tose was experiencing financial hardship due to a number of cancelled games from partners including Square Enix and Bandai Namco. For the period covering September 2023 to May 2024 the studio's net sales fell nearly 28%, leading to an operating loss of 599 million yen ($3.7 million). Tose announced its decision to wind down operations in Philippines and Sapporo, Hokkaido. However, between September 2024 and February 2025, Tose saw a major turnaround in profitability thanks to a 56% increase in sales. Tose announced in 2025 it would prioritize console game development due to mobile game market's saturation. In 2025, Atlus accounted for 22% of the company's total revenue, making it Tose’s top customer for the second year in a row. Second was Square Enix, which made up 17% of the developer’s total revenue.

On June 30, 2025, Tose announced its current offices in Nagaokakyo will be demolished and rebuilt for a 2028 opening.

== List of games developed by Tose ==
NOTE: Titles released before the official website was created and that weren't pictured in the company's corporate reports from either 2000 or 2001 were verified with information compiled by various journalists. Some have not been officially confirmed as Tose-developed products by any of the games' publishers, co-developers, nor Tose itself until Tose created a website to document its work.

Year	Title	Platform	Publisher	Notes	Ref.
1980	Sasuke vs. Commander	Arcade	SNK		
1981	Vanguard	Arcade	SNK		
1983	Apploon	Sord M5, PC-88	Takara		
1984	Vanguard II	Arcade	SNK		
1985	Chubby Cherub	NES	Bandai		
1985	City Connection	NES	Jaleco		
1985	Exerion	NES	Jaleco	Porting original arcade version to NES.	
1985	Ikki	NES	Sunsoft	Porting original arcade version to NES.	
1985	Knight Lore	MSX	Jaleco	Porting the original ZX Spectrum version to MSX platform.	
1985	Ninja JaJaMaru-kun	NES	Jaleco	Originated as a port of Ninja-kun: Adventure in the Demon Castle.	
1985	Spelunker	NES	Broderbund; Irem	Co-developed with Irem	
1985	Tag Team Match: M.U.S.C.L.E.	NES	Bandai		
1985	Space Invaders	NES	Taito		
1986	Choplifter	NES	Jaleco	Porting original arcade version to NES.	
1986	Dragon Ball: Shen Long no Nazo	NES	Bandai	Known as Dragon Power in North America	
1986	Kid Icarus	NES	Nintendo		
1986	Knight Lore	Famicom Disk System	Jaleco	Redesigned version of the original game.	
1986	Mappy-Land	NES	Namco		
1986	Ninja Kid	NES	Bandai		
1986	Super Xevious: GAMP no Nazo	NES	Namco		
1987	Bases Loaded	NES	Jaleco	A Game Boy version was released in 1990.	
1987	Dragon Buster	NES	Namco	Porting the original arcade version to NES.	
1987	Karaoke Studio	NES	Bandai		
1987	Lost Word of Jenny	NES	Takara	Tie-in to Takara's Jenny doll.	
1987	Lupin Sansei: Pandora no Isan	NES	Namco		
1987	Saint Seiya: Ōgon Densetsu	NES	Bandai		
1987	Yamamura Misa Suspense: Kyōto Ryū no Tera Satsujin Jiken	NES	Taito		
1988	Akira	NES	Taito	Based on the Akira animated film.	
1988	Bases Loaded II: Second Season	NES	Jaleco		
1988	Demon Sword	NES	Taito		
1988	Dragon Ball: Daimaou Fukkatsu	NES	Bandai		
1988	Famicom Detective Club: The Missing Heir	Famicom Disk System	Nintendo		
1988	Goal!	NES	Jaleco		
1988	Namco Classic	NES	Namco		
1988	Racket Attack	NES	Jaleco		
1989	Bandai Golf: Challenge Pebble Beach	NES	Bandai		
1989	Dragon Buster II: Yami no Fuuin	NES	Namco		
1989	Dragon Ball 3: Gokuuden	NES	Bandai		
1989	Dusty Diamond's All-Star Softball	NES	Tonkin House, Broderbund		
1989	Golf-kko Open	NES	Taito		
1989	Hyper Lode Runner	Game Boy	Bandai		
1989	Kore ga Pro Yakyū '89	PC Engine	Intec		
1989	Nishimura Kyōtarō Mystery: Blue Train Satsujin Jiken	NES	Irem		
1989	Pinball Quest	NES	Jaleco		
1989	Master Karateka	Game Boy	Bandai		
1989	Seaside Volley	Game Boy	Tonkin House	Released as Malibu Beach Volleyball in North America	
1989	Shin Moero!! Pro Yakyuu	NES	Jaleco		
1989	Sakigake!! Otokojuku: Shippu Ichi Gou Sei	NES	Bandai		
1989	Shooting Range	NES	Bandai	Compatible with the NES Zapper.	
1989	Short Order / Eggsplode!	NES	Nintendo		
1989	Tsuru Teruhito no Jissen Kabushiki Bai Bai Game	TurboGrafx-16	Intec		
1989	Yamamura Misa Suspense: Kyōto Hana no Misshitsu Satsujin Jiken	NES	Taito		
1990	Akuma-kun: Makai no Wana	NES	Bandai		
1990	Bases Loaded 3	NES	Jaleco		
1990	Boxing	Game Boy	Tonkin House	Known as Heavyweight Championship Boxing in North America	
1990	Dangerous Seed	Sega Genesis	Namco		
1990	NES Play Action Football	NES	Nintendo		
1990	Oira Jajamaru! Sekai Daibouken	Game Boy	Jaleco	Known as Maru's Mission in North America	
1990	Roadster	Game Boy	Tonkin House		
1990	Ultraman Club: Teki Kaijuu o Hakken Seyo!	Game Boy	Bandai		
1990	Valkyrie no Densetsu	PC Engine	Namco		
1990	Yamamura Misa Suspense: Kyōto Zai-tech Satsujin Jiken	NES	Hect		
1991	Bases Loaded 4	NES	Jaleco		
1991	Frankenstein: The Monster Returns	NES	Bandai		
1991	Kid Icarus: Of Myths and Monsters	Game Boy	Nintendo		
1991	SD Gundam Gaiden: Knight Gundam Monogatari	SNES	Bandai		
1991	Soccer	Game Boy	Tonkin House		
1991	Super Bases Loaded	SNES	Jaleco		
1991	Super Tennis	SNES	Tonkin House		
1991	Taiheiki	TurboGrafx CD	Intec		
1992	Bazooka Blitzkrieg	SNES	Bandai	Supports the Super Scope	
1992	Goal!	SNES	Jaleco	Sequel to original Goal!, renamed Goal! in North America and Super Goal! in Europe.	
1992	Legends of the Diamond	NES	Bandai		
1992	Namco Classic II	NES	Namco		
1992	Pipe Dream	SNES	Lucasfilm Games	Porting original Pipe Mania game to SNES.	
1992	Sangokushi II: Haō no Tairiku	NES	Namco		
1992	SD Gundam Gaiden 2: Entaku no Kishi	NES	Yutaka		
1992	Super Tetris 2 + BomBliss	SNES	Bullet-Proof Software	SNES port of Tetris 2 + BomBliss	
1992	Toxic Crusaders	NES	Bandai		
1992	Pro Yakyuu Super League CD	Sega CD	Sega		
1992	Yoshi's Cookie	NES, SNES	Nintendo		
1993	Dragon Ball Z: Super Butouden	SNES	Bandai		
1993	Dragon Ball Z: Super Butouden 2	SNES	Bandai		
1993	Goal!	Game Boy	Jaleco		
1993	Tetris 2	NES, Game Boy	Nintendo		
1993	Yoshi's Safari	SNES	Nintendo		
1994	Dragon Ball Z: Buyuu Retsuden	Sega Genesis	Bandai		
1994	Dragon Ball Z: Super Butouden 3	SNES	Bandai		
1994	From TV Animation Slam Dunk: Yonkyo Taiketsu!!	SNES	Bandai	Based on the Slam Dunk manga series.	
1994	Kidou Senshi V-Gundam	SNES	Bandai		
1994	Nishimura Keitarou Travel Mystery: Akugyaku no Kisetsu	3DO	Pack-In-Video		
1994	Point Blank	PlayStation	Namco		
1994	Rokudenashi Blues: Taiketsu! Tokyo Shitennou	SNES	Bandai		
1994	Super Tetris 2 + BomBliss Genteiban	SNES	Bullet-Proof Software	Revised version of Super Tetris 2 + BomBliss	
1994	Super Tetris 3	SNES	Bullet-Proof Software		
1994	Ultraman Powered	3DO	Bandai		
1994	Yamamura Misa Suspense: Miyako Kurama Sansou Satsujin Jiken	3DO	Matsushita Electric Industrial		
1994	Yuu Yuu Hakusho 2: Kakutou no Sho	SNES	Namco	Based on the Yū Yū Hakusho manga series.	
1995	Arcade Classic No. 3: Galaga/Galaxian	Game Boy	Nintendo		
1995	Bakushou!! All Yoshimoto Quiz Ou Ketteisen DX	Sega Saturn, PlayStation	Yoshimoto Kogyo		
1995	Crayon Shin-chan: Puzzle Daimaou no Nazo	3DO	Bandai		
1995	Dragon Ball Z: Ultimate Battle 22	PlayStation	Bandai	Games share character animation and roster.	
1995	Game Boy Gallery	Game Boy	Nintendo		
1995	Ida Jiyouji Nightmare Interactive: Moon Cradle: Igyou no Hanayome	3DO	Pack-In-Video		
1995	Mario's Tennis	Virtual Boy	Nintendo		
1995	Ninku	PlayStation	Tomy	Based on the Ninku manga series	
1995	Shinobi Legions	Sega Saturn	Sega		
1995	Super Bombliss	SNES, Game Boy	Bullet-Proof Software	Game Boy version released as Tetris Blast in North America.	
1995	Virtual Bowling	Virtual Boy	Athena		
1995	Yuu Yuu Hakusho Final: Makai Saikyou Retsuden	SNES	Namco		
1996	Dragon Ball Z: Hyper Dimension	SNES	Bandai		
1996	Funky Fantasy	Sega Saturn	Yoshimoto Kogyo		
1996	Matsukata Hiroki no World Fishing	Sega Saturn	MediaQuest		
1996	Namco Gallery Vol. 1	Game Boy	Namco		
1996	Namco Gallery Vol. 2	Game Boy	Namco		
1996	TurfWind '96: Take Yutaka Kyōsōba Ikusei Game	Sega Saturn, PlayStation	Jaleco		
1997	Harvest Moon GB	Game Boy	Victor Interactive Software		
1997	Dragon Ball GT: Final Bout	PlayStation	Bandai		
1997	Final Fantasy IV	PlayStation	Square		
1997	Final Fantasy VII	PlayStation	Square	Co-developed with Square	
1997	Game & Watch Gallery	Game Boy	Nintendo	Co-developed with Nintendo R&D 1	
1997	Jigoku Sensei Nuubee	PlayStation	Bandai	Based on the Hell Teacher: Jigoku Sensei Nube manga series.	
1997	Kawa no Nushi Tsuri 3	Game Boy	Victor Interactive Software	Known as Legend of the River King outside of Japan.	
1997	Konami GB Collection Vol. 1	Game Boy	Konami	Compilation includingGradius, Castlevania: The Adventure, Konami Racing, Probotector	
1997	Konami GB Collection Vol. 2	Game Boy	Konami	Compilation including Pop n' TwinBee, Mystical Ninja Starring Goemon, Bikers, Guttang Gottong	
1997	Layer Section II	Sega Saturn	Taito	Known as RayStorm on all other platforms.	
1997	Moon Cradle	Sega Saturn	Victor Interactive Software		
1997	Namco Museum Vol. 5	PlayStation	Namco	Compilation includes Metro-Cross, Baraduke, Dragon Spirit, Pac-Mania, and Valkyrie no Densetsu.	
1997	Point Blank	PlayStation	Namco		
1997	Shin Theme Park	Sega Saturn	Electronic Arts		
1998	Bakutsu Retrieve Master	Game Boy	Konami		
1998	Digital Monster Ver. S Digimon Tamers	Sega Saturn	Bandai		
1998	Dragon Warrior Monsters	Game Boy	Enix		
1998	EVE: The Lost One	PlayStation	Imagineer	Part of the EVE series	
1998	Fairy Kitty no Kaiun Jiten: Yousei no Kuni no Uranai Shugyou	Game Boy	Imagineer	Based on Hello Kitty.	
1998	Final Fantasy V	PlayStation	Square		
1998	Game & Watch Gallery 2	Game Boy	Nintendo	Co-developed with Nintendo R&D 1	
1998	Grander Musashi RV	Game Boy	Bandai	Based on the Grander Musashi RV manga series.	
1998	Konami GB Collection Vol. 3	Game Boy	Konami	Compilation including Gradius II: The Return of the Hero, Castlevania II: Belmont's Revenge, Yie Ar Kung-Fu, Antarctic Adventure	
1998	Konami GB Collection Vol. 4	Game Boy	Konami	Parodius, Block Game, Track & Field, Frogger	
1998	Namco Anthology 1	PlayStation	Namco	Compilation includes Star Luster, The Tower of Babel, Sangokushi II: Haō no Tairiku, and Wrestleball.	
1998	Namco Anthology 2	PlayStation	Namco	Compilation includes Valkyrie no Bōken, King of Kings, Namco Classic II, and Pac-Attack.	
1998	Point Blank 2	PlayStation	Namco		
1998	Sanrio Timenet: Kako Hen / Mirai Hen	Game Boy	Imagineer	Two versions of the game were released.	
1998	Shin Megami Tensei: Devil Summoner: Soul Hackers	PlayStation	Atlus		
1998	Theme Aquarium	PlayStation	Electronic Arts		
1998	Thousand Arms	PlayStation	Atlus		
1998	Tokyo Disneyland: Fantasy Tour	Game Boy	Tomy		
1998	Umi no Nushi Tsuri 2	Game Boy	Victor Interactive Software		
1998	Uno DX	PlayStation	MediaQuest		
1998	Wangan Trial	PlayStation	Victor Interactive Software		
1999	Capcom Generation: Dai 2 Shuu Makai to Kishi	PlayStation	Victor Interactive Software	Compilation including Ghosts 'n Goblins, Ghouls 'n Ghosts, and Super Ghouls 'n Ghosts	
1999	Chocobo Collection	PlayStation	Square	Compilation including Chocobo Racing, Dice de Chocobo, and Chocobo Stallion.	
1999	Chocobo Stallion	PlayStation	Square		
1999	Chrono Trigger	PlayStation, Nintendo DS		Porting to PlayStation in 1999; Nintendo DS in 2008	
1999	Dancing Furby	Game Boy Color		Based on the Furby toy.	
1999	Dragon Warrior I & II	Game Boy		Includes Dragon Quest and Dragon Quest II.	
1999	Final Fantasy VI	PlayStation		Porting to Sony PlayStation	
1999	Final Fantasy Anthology	PlayStation			
1999	Final Fantasy Collection	PlayStation			
1999	Ganbare Goemon: Tengu-tō no Gyakushū!	Game Boy	Konami		
1999	Game & Watch Gallery 3	Game Boy	Nintendo	Co-developed with Nintendo R&D 1	
1999	Gunpey	PlayStation	Bandai	Porting original WonderSwan version.	
1999	Harvest Moon: Back to Nature	PlayStation	Victor Interactive Software	A version of the game, featuring a female protagonist, was released in 2000.	
1999	Harvest Moon GBC	Game Boy Color	Victor Interactive Software	Re-released of Harvest Moon GB.	
1999	Legend of the River King GBC	Game Boy Color	Victor Interactive Software	Re-Release of Kawa no Nushi Tsuri 3	
1999	Metal Walker	Game Boy Color	Capcom		
1999	Slayers Royal 2	PlayStation	Entertainment Software Publishing	Porting from original Sega Saturn version.	
1999	Super Bombliss DX	Game Boy	Bullet-Proof Software	Colorized version of Tetris Blast.	
1999	Super Robot Wars Compact	WonderSwan	Banpresto		
2000	Bass Landing	PlayStation	ASCII Entertainment		
2000	Dear Daniel no Sweet Adventure: Kitty-Chan o Sagashite	Game Boy Color	Imagineer	Based on Hello Kitty	
2000	Dragon Quest VII: Warriors of Eden	Sony PlayStation	Enix		
2000	Dragon Warrior III	Game Boy Color	Square Enix		
2000	Gunpey EX	WonderSwan	Bandai	Compatible with the WonderGate peripheral.	
2000	Hello Kitty no Sweet Adventure: Daniel-kun ni Aitai	Game Boy Color	Imagineer	Based on Hello Kitty	
2000	Elie no Atelier	Game Boy Color	Imagineer	Sequel to Marie no Atelier GB	
2000	Final Fantasy	WonderSwan	Square	Localizing	
2000	Marie no Atelier GB	Game Boy Color	Imagineer		
2000	Medarot Card Robottle	Game Boy Color	Imagineer		
2000	Metal Gear: Ghost Babel	Game Boy Color	Konami	Co-developed with Konami	
2000	Nushi Tsuri Adventure: Kite no Bouken	Game Boy Color	Victor Interactive Software		
2000	Pia Carrot e Youkoso!! 2.2	Game Boy Color	NEC Interchannel	Part of the Welcome to Pia Carrot!! series of visual novels.	
2000	Point Blank 3	PlayStation	Namco		
2000	Resident Evil Survivor	PlayStation	Capcom		
2000	Sega GT	Sega Dreamcast	Sega	Co-developed with Wow Entertainment	
2000	Winnie the Pooh: Adventures in the 100 Acre Wood	Game Boy Color	NewKidCo, Disney Interactive		
2000–2001	Super Robot Wars Compact 2	WonderSwan	Banpresto		
2001	Bad Batsumaru: Robo Battle	Game Boy	Imaginerr		
2001	Bass Landing 2	PlayStation	ASCII Entertainment		
2001	Dragon Warrior Monsters 2	Game Boy	Square	Released as Cobi's Journey and Tara's Adventure	
2001	Final Fantasy Chronicles	PlayStation	Square	Compilation includes SNES versions of Final Fantasy IV and Chrono Trigger.	
2001	Hello Kitty to Dear Daniel no Dream Adventure	Game Boy	Imagineer	Based on Hello Kitty	
2001	Hero Hero-kun	Game Boy	Imagineer		
2002	Densetsu no Starfy	Game Boy Advance	Nintendo		
2002	Game & Watch Gallery 4	Game Boy Advance	Nintendo		
2002	Kinnikuman II-Sei: Dream Tag Match	WonderSwan Color	Bandai		
2002	Final Fantasy Origins	PlayStation	Square	Porting to PlayStation	
2002	Resident Evil Zero	GameCube	Capcom		
2002	Shrek: Hassle at the Castle	Game Boy Advance	TDK Mediactive		
2003	2002 FIFA World Cup	Nintendo GameCube	Electronic Arts	Co-developed GameCube version with EA Canada, Creations, and Intelligent Games	
2003	Densetsu no Starfy 2	Game Boy Advance	Nintendo		
2003	Dragon Quest Monsters: Caravan Heart	Game Boy Advance	Enix		
2003	The King of Route 66	PlayStation 2	Sega	Co-developed with Sega-AM2	
2003	Slime Mori Mori Dragon Quest	Game Boy Advance	Square Enix		
2004	Densetsu no Starfy 3	Game Boy Advance	Nintendo		
2004	Final Fantasy I & II: Dawn of Souls	Game Boy Advance	Nintendo	Porting to GBA; additional content	
2004	Virtua Quest	PlayStation 2	Sega		
2005	Code of the Samurai	PlayStation 2	Midas Interactive Entertainment	Co-developed with Red Entertainment	
2005	Dragon Quest Heroes: Rocket Slime	Nintendo DS	Square Enix		
2005	Final Fantasy IV Advance	Game Boy Advance	Nintendo	Porting to Game Boy Advance	
2005	The Nightmare Before Christmas: The Pumpkin King	Game Boy Advance	D3 Publisher/Buena Vista Games		
2005	Sega Casino	Nintendo DS	Sega		
2005	Super Princess Peach	Nintendo DS	Nintendo		
2006	Avatar: The Last Airbender	Nintendo DS, PlayStation Portable	THQ		
2006	Densetsu no Starfy 4	Nintendo DS	Nintendo		
2006	Dragon Quest Monsters: Joker	Nintendo DS	Square Enix		
2006	Final Fantasy V Advance	Game Boy Advance	Nintendo	Porting to Game Boy Advance	
2006	Final Fantasy VI Advance	Game Boy Advance	Nintendo	Porting to Game Boy Advance	
2006	Ultimate Ghosts'n Goblins	PlayStation Portable	Capcom		
2006	Valkyrie Profile: Lenneth	PlayStation Portable	Square Enix	Porting to PlayStation Portable.	
2007	Avatar: The Last Airbender – The Burning Earth	Nintendo DS	THQ		
2007	Final Fantasy Tactics: The War of the Lions	PlayStation Portable	Square Enix	Co-developed with Square Enix	
2007	Front Mission	Nintendo DS	Square Enix	Porting to Nintendo DS	
2007	GONG! Online	PC	Sleepy Giant Entertainment		
2007	MySims	Nintendo DS	Electronic Arts		
2007	Star Ocean: First Departure	PlayStation Portable	Square Enix	Developed enhanced remake of the original	
2008	The Legendary Starfy	Nintendo DS	Nintendo		
2008	Ōkami	Nintendo Wii	Capcom	Co-developed Nintendo Wii version with Ready At Dawn	
2008	Star Ocean: Second Evolution	PlayStation Portable	Square Enix	Developed enhanced remake of the original	
2008	WWE SmackDown vs. Raw 2009	Nintendo DS	THQ		
2009	Active Life: Extreme Challenge	Wii	Bandai Namco		
2009	Crystal Defenders	Xbox 360	Square Enix		
2009	Dragon Quest IX: Sentinels of the Starry Skies	Nintendo DS	Square Enix / Nintendo		
2009	MySims Agents	Nintendo DS	Electronic Arts		
2009	WWE SmackDown vs. Raw 2010	Nintendo DS	THQ		
2010	Dragon Quest Monsters: Joker 2	Nintendo DS	Square Enix		
2010	Pac-Man Party	Wii	Namco		
2011	Slime Mori Mori Dragon Quest 3	Nintendo DS	Square Enix		
2012	Dragon Quest Monsters: Terry's Wonderland 3D	Android, iOS, Nintendo 3DS	Square Enix		
2012	Wii Karaoke U	Wii U	Nintendo		
2013	Disney Planes	PC, Nintendo DS, Nintendo 3DS	Disney Interactive		
2013	Dragon Quest VIII	Square Enix	Sound and music programming.	Porting to mobile platforms. Ported to the 3DS in 2015.	
2013	Resident Evil Revelations HD	PC, Wii U, PlayStation 3, Xbox 360	Capcom		
2015	Monster Strike	Nintendo 3DS	Mixi		
2016	Dragon Quest Monsters: Joker 3	Nintendo 3DS	Square Enix	Development support	
2016	Paper Mario Color Splash	Wii U	Nintendo	Environment art support for Intelligent Systems	
2016	World of Final Fantasy	Nintendo Switch, PC, PlayStation Vita, PlayStation 4, Xbox One	Square Enix	Co-developed with Square Enix	
2017	Dragon Quest Rivals	Android, iOS, Nintendo Switch	Square Enix	Development support; Service terminated in 2021	
2017	Fight League	Android, iOS	Mixi	Co-developed with XFLAG Studio	
2017	Itadaki Street: Dragon Quest & Final Fantasy 30th Anniversary	PlayStation 4, PlayStation Vita	Square Enix	Development support	
2017	The Legend of Zelda: Breath of the Wild	Nintendo Switch	Nintendo	Porting to Nintendo Switch	
2017	Splatoon 2	Nintendo Switch	Nintendo		
2018	Dragon Quest Monsters: Terry's Wonderland 3D	Android, iOS	Square Enix		
2019	Dragon Quest Monsters: Terry's Wonderland RETRO	Nintendo Switch	Square Enix		
2019	Sekiro: Shadows Die Twice	PC, PlayStation 4, Xbox One	FromSoftware	Design development support	
2019	Utawarerumono Lost Flag	Android, iOS	Aquaplus	Part of the Utawarerumono series of visual novels.	
2020	Aikatsu Planet!	Arcade	Bandai	Part of the Data Carddass series	
2020	Dragon Quest Monsters 2: Iru and Luca's Marvelous Mysterious Key	Android, iOS	Square Enix		
2020	Paper Mario: The Origami King	Nintendo Switch	Nintendo	Provided designing and audio development	
2021	Famicom Detective Club: The Missing Heir (Remake)	Nintendo Switch	Nintendo	Remake of the 1988 original	
2021	Final Fantasy Pixel Remaster	Android, iOS, Nintendo Switch, PC, PlayStation 4, Xbox Series X/S	Square Enix		
2021	Scarlet Nexus	PC, PlayStation 4, PlayStation 5, Xbox One, Xbox Series X/S	Bandai Namco Entertainment	Co-developed with Bandai Namco Studios	
2022	Crisis Core: Final Fantasy VII Reunion	PC, Nintendo Switch, PlayStation 4, PlayStation 5, Xbox One, Xbox Series X/S	Square Enix	Co-developed with Square Enix	
2022	Dragon Quest Treasures	Nintendo Switch, PC	Square Enix	Co-developed with Square Enix	
2022	Nijigasaki High School Idol Club TOKIMEKI RunRuns	Android, iOS	Bushiroad	Part of the Love Live! series	
2023	Dragon Quest Monsters: The Dark Prince	Android, iOS, Nintendo Switch, PC	Square Enix	Co-developed with Square Enix,	
2023	WarioWare: Move It!	Nintendo Switch	Nintendo	Co-developed with Intelligent Systems	
2024	The Battle Cats Unite!	Nintendo Switch	PONOS Corporation	Nintendo Switch version of The Battle Cats mobile app	
2024	Karaoke Joysound	Nintendo Switch	Nintendo		
2024	Paper Mario: The Thousand-Year Door	Nintendo Switch	Nintendo	Provided development assistance on sound design and production.	
2024	Soul Covenant	Meta Quest, PC, PlayStation VR2	Thirdverse		
2025	Dragon Quest I & II HD-2D Remake	PC, Nintendo Switch, Nintendo Switch 2, Playstation 5, Xbox Series X/S	Square Enix	Development support	
2025	Tales of Graces f Remastered	Nintendo Switch, PC, PlayStation 4, PlayStation 5, Xbox One, Xbox Series X/S	Bandai Namco Entertainment		
2026	Tales of Eternia Remastered	Nintendo Switch, Nintendo Switch 2, PC, PlayStation 4, PlayStation 5, Xbox Series X/S	Bandai Namco Entertainment		

Tose also worked on a version of Tetris DS for THQ that was ultimately unreleased.
