= Dov Reiser =

Israeli actor (born 1947)

- דב רייזר
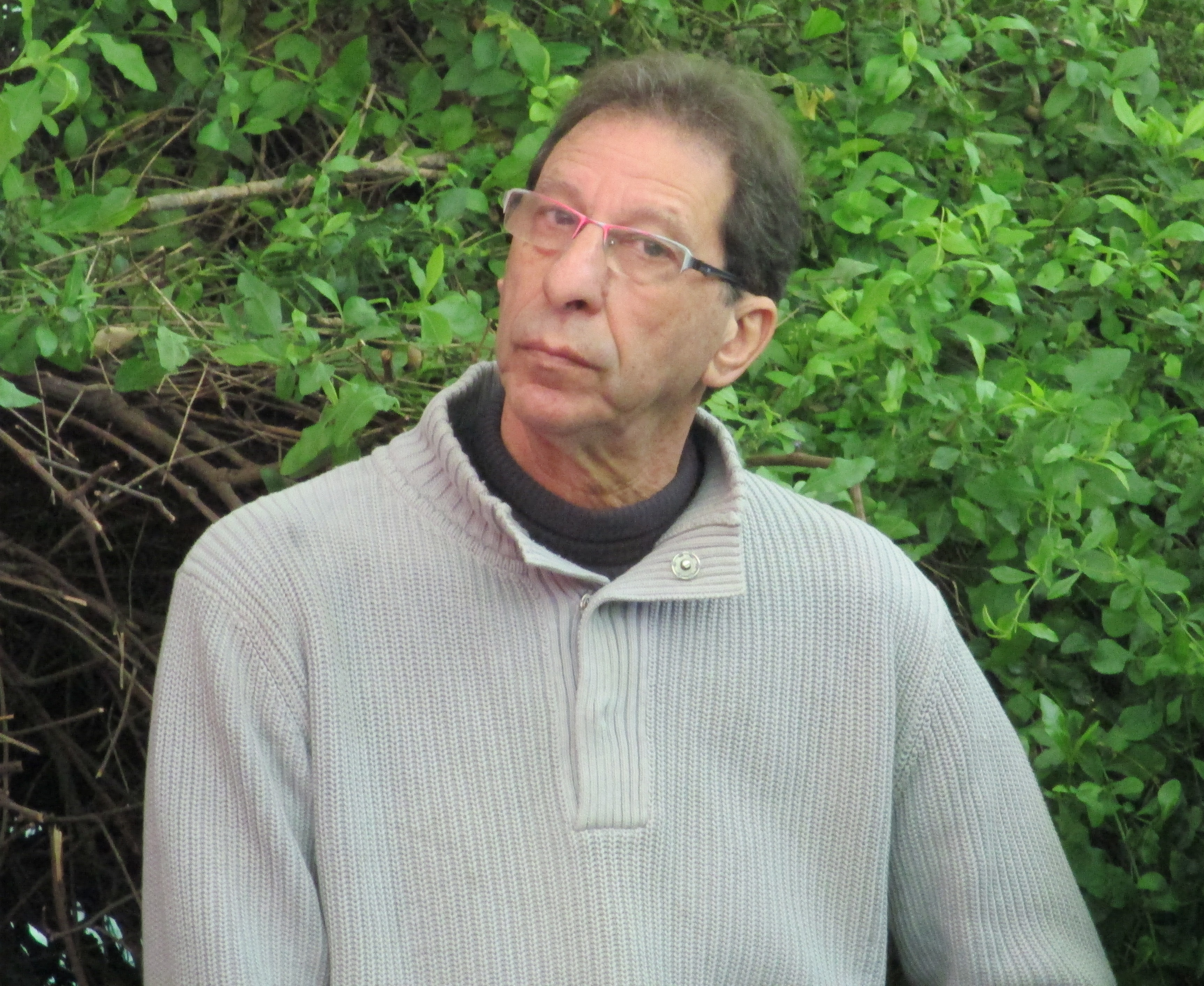
- Born: Dovaleh Reiser; 28 September 1947 (age 78); Tel Aviv, Mandatory Palestine
- Occupations: Actor; voice actor; announcer; narrator
- Years active: 1965–present

Dov Reiser (Hebrew: דב רייזר; born 28 September 1947) is an Israeli actor and voice actor.

== Biography ==
Born in Tel Aviv, Reiser began his acting career at the age of 18. He is a frequent performer at the Habima Theatre and has been a staff member there since 1986. He has also performed at the Beersheba Theatre from 1974 to 1977 as well as the Cameri Theatre. Reiser was renowned for his appearances in the French theatre adaptations of plays such as The Caucasian Chalk Circle, The Cherry Orchard and The Threepenny Opera.

On film and television, Reiser made his film debut in the 1972 film The Great Telephone Robbery directed by Menahem Golan and he often made appearances on the entertainment program Zehu Ze!. He has also appeared in the 1979 film Dizengoff 99 and the 1987 film Ha-Muvtal Batito. His most popular television appearance was on a short lived 1994 sitcom in which he plays a widowed father and he also portrayed the prophet Nathan in a 1989 TV film directed by Ram Loevy.

As a voice actor, Reiser dubbed the voices of many animated characters into the Hebrew language and is considered to be one of the most influential and successful Hebrew dubbing actors. He has voiced the narrator and Kame-Sennin in Dragon Ball Z and Ollie in Ox Tales. He has also frequently dubbed characters created by The Walt Disney Company in films such as Cogsworth in Beauty and the Beast, Henry J. Waternoose in Monsters, Inc., The Duke of Weselton in Frozen, Prince John in Robin Hood, Edgar in The Aristocats and Grimsby in The Little Mermaid. Outside of Disney, he voiced Cornelius Fudge in the Hebrew dub of Harry Potter and the Goblet of Fire and Oogway in Kung Fu Panda. In addition, Reiser voiced Iroh in Avatar: The Last Airbender and The Legend of Korra.

=== Awards ===
In 1996, Reiser received the Klatchkin Award for outstanding actor. He also won the Maskin Award in 2019.

== Filmography ==
=== Dubbing ===
- A Bug's Life (Mr. Soil, Thumper)
- A Turtle's Tale: Sammy's Adventures (Seagull)
- Andre (Jack Adams (Duncan Fraser))
- Animals United (additional voices)
- Antz (additional voices)
- Arthur and the Invisibles (The King)
  - Arthur and the Revenge of Mtazard (The King)
  - Arthur 3: The War of the Two Worlds (The King)
- Astro Boy (ZOG, Mr. Mustachio)
- Babar: The Movie (Rataxes)
- Barnyard (Mr. Beady)
- Batman: Mask of the Phantasm (Harvey Bullock)
- Batman Beyond: Return of the Joker (Benjamin Knox / Bonk)
- Bee Movie (Bee Larry King)
- Ben 10/Generator Rex: Heroes United (Humungousaur)
- Beverly Hills Chihuahua (additional voices)
- Brother Bear (Old Denahi)
- Brother Bear 2 (Chilkoot)
- Cars (Serge)
- Cars 2 (Serge)
- Cats & Dogs (Butch)
- Cats & Dogs: The Revenge of Kitty Galore (Mr. Tinkles)
- Cinderella (Grand Duke))
- Cloudy with a Chance of Meatballs (Joe Towne)
- Dragon Ball movies
  - Dragon Ball: Curse of the Blood Rubies (King Gourmeth)
  - Dragon Ball: Sleeping Princess in Devil's Castle (Krillin)
  - Dragon Ball: Mystic Adventure (Krillin)
  - Dragon Ball Z: Dead Zone (Krillin)
  - Dragon Ball Z: The World's Strongest (Krillin)
  - Dragon Ball Z: The Tree of Might (Krillin)
  - Dragon Ball Z: Lord Slug (Krillin)
  - Dragon Ball Z: Cooler's Revenge (Krillin, Frieza)
  - Dragon Ball Z: The Return of Cooler (Krillin, Mr. Popo)
  - Dragon Ball Z: Super Android 13! (Krillin)
  - Dragon Ball Z: Broly – The Legendary Super Saiyan (Krillin)
  - Dragon Ball Z: Bojack Unbound (Krillin, Kogu)
  - Dragon Ball Z: Broly – Second Coming (Krillin)
  - Dragon Ball Z: Bio-Broly (Krillin)
  - Dragon Ball Z: Fusion Reborn (Frieza)
  - Dragon Ball Z: Wrath of the Dragon (Krillin)
- Dragon Hunters (Bat 1)
- El Cid: The Legend (additional voices)
- Enchanted (additional voices)
- Ferdinand (additional voices)
- Finding Nemo (Bubbles)
- Flushed Away (additional voices)
- Free Birds (S.T.E.V.E.)
- Garfield: The Movie (Happy Chapman, Walter J. Chapman)
- Happy Feet 2 (additional voices)
- Help! I'm a Fish (additional voices)
- Hoodwinked! (Dolph, Jimmy Lizard)
- Hoodwinked Too! Hood vs. Evil (Mad Hog)
- Horton Hears a Who! (Old Who)
- Howl's Moving Castle (additional voices)
- Inside Out (Anger) (trailer)
- Joseph: King of Dreams (Jacob, Baker, Horse Trader)
- Kung Fu Panda (Oogway)
  - Kung Fu Panda 3 (Oogway)
- Little Bee Julia and Lady Life (additional voices)
- Looney Tunes film series
  - Bugs Bunny's 3rd Movie: 1001 Rabbit Tales (Sylvester, Elmer Fudd, Hassan, Old Storyteller, Henzel, Genie, Mouse)
  - Looney Tunes: Back in Action (Elmer Fudd)
- Madagascar (Mort)
- Madagascar: Escape 2 Africa (Mort, Rico)
- Madagascar 3: Europe's Most Wanted (Mort, Stefano)
- Mary Poppins (additional voices)
- Meet the Robinsons (Coach, Laszlo)
- Megamind (Lord Scott)
- Mirror Mirror (Brighton (Nathan Lane))
- Moana (Chief Tui)
- Monsters University (Yeti/The Abominable Snowman)
- Monsters vs. Aliens (Gallaxhar)
- My Little Pony: The Movie (Moochick, Grundle)
- Niko & The Way to the Stars (Smiley)
- Nim's Island (additional voices)
- Peter Pan (Pirate voices)
- Planet 51 (additional voices)
- Popeye's Voyage: The Quest for Pappy (Popeye)
- Puss in Boots (additional voices)
- Racing Stripes (Goose)
- Ratatouille (Skinner)
- Robots (Madame Gasket)
- Scooby-Doo 2: Monsters Unleashed (10,000 Volt Ghost, Black Knight Ghost, additional voices)
- Shark Tale (additional voices)
- Sharpay's Fabulous Adventure (Mr. Gonzez (Jorge Molina), Sound Engineer (Christian Potenza))
- Shrek Forever After (The Muffin Man)
- Sinbad: Legend of the Seven Seas (Additional voices)
- Smallfoot (additional voices)
- Sml Fry (additional voices)
- Space Buddies (Yuri (Diedrich Bader))
- Space Chimps 2: Zartog Strikes Back (Zartog)
- Spirited Away (additional voices)
- Star Wars: The Clone Wars (Ziro the Hutt)
- Stuart Little 2 (Snowbell)
- Stuart Little 3: Call of the Wild (Snowbell)
- Surf's Up (additional voices)
- The Adventures of Pinocchio (Pastry shop baker (Marcello Magni), The Coachman (Jean-Claude Dreyfus))
- The Adventures of Tintin: The Secret of the Unicorn (Nestor)
- The Angry Birds Movie (Chuck)
- The Ant Bully (Wasp Leader)
- The Cat in the Hat (additional voices)
- The Gruffo (Owl)
  - The Gruffo's Child (Owl)
- The Land Before Time II: The Great Valley Adventure (Petrie)
- The Legend of Secret Pass (Chuckster)
- The Little Mermaid II: Return to the Sea (Tip)
- The Living Forest (Hu-Hu)
- The Mighty Kong (additional voices)
- The Muppets (Gonzo the Great)
- The Nut Job (additional voices)
- The Prince and the Pauper (Archbishop)
- The Prince of Egypt (Pharaoh Seti I)
- The Rale Shlemiel (Treitel, Peddler)
- The Rescuers (Mr. Snoops, Deacon Owl)
- The Rugrats Movie (Drew Pickles, Sergant)
- The Simpsons Movie (Moe Szyslak, Apu Nahasapeemapetilon, Chief Wiggum, Comic Book Guy, Janitor)
- The Spiderwick Chronicles (additional voices)
- The SpongeBob SquarePants Movie (King Neptune)
- The Tale of Despereaux (Boldo)
- The Three Musketeers (Porthos)
- The Ugly Duckling and Me! (Swan 1)
- The Water Horse: Legend of the Deep (Lt. Wormsley (Erroll Shand))
- Thomas and the Magic Railroad (Thomas the Tank Engine)
- Tinker Bell (The Minister of Spring)
  - Secret of the Wings (The Minster of Spring)
- TMNT (Gener Gato)
- Tom and Jerry: A Nutcracker Tale (Tom, additional voices)
- Tony Hawk in Boom Boom Sabotage (additional voices)
- Valiant (Mercury)
- WALL-E (additional voices)
- Winnie the Pooh (Rabbit)
- Wreck-it Ralph (King Candy)
- Zambezia (Sekhuru)
- Zookeeper (Bernie the Gorila)
- Zootopia (Stu Hopps)
