= Bulma =

Fictional character from Dragon Ball

- Dragon Ball character
- Sketch of Bulma by Akira Toriyama
- First appearance: Dragon Ball chapter #1 "Bulma and Son Goku", 19 June 1984 (Weekly Shōnen Jump 1984 #51)
- Created by: Akira Toriyama
- Portrayed by: Emmy Rossum (Dragonball Evolution); Other: Lee Joo-hee (Fight Son Goku, Win Son Goku); Jeannie Hsieh (The Magic Begins)
- Voiced by (Japanese): Hiromi Tsuru (1986–2017); Aya Hisakawa (2018–present); Mai Nakahara (Mini; Dragon Ball Daima)
- Voiced by (English): Leslie Alexander (Funimation (Note: DB film 2)); Tiffany Vollmer (Funimation (Note: 1999–2009)); Monica Rial (Funimation (Note: 2010–present)); Other: Wendee Lee (Note: Originally credited as Wendee Swan) (Harmony Gold (Note: first five episodes of DB and film) and Bang Zoom! (Note: Super)); Mitch Frankenberger (Creative Products Corp. (Note: DBZ)); Ethel Lizano (Creative Products Corp. (Note: Dragon Ball Regal VHS/VCD edit of second and third films)); Maggie Blue O'Hara (Note: Originally credited as Maggie O'Hara) (BLT/Ocean (Note: DB first film; DBZ, ep. 123–260 [108–245 edited])); Lalainia Lindbjerg (BLT/Ocean (Note: Dragon Ball eps. 1–13, fill-in scene in 1995 version of first film; DBZ initial run, eps. 1–67 [1–53 edited])); Leslie Alexander (Funimation (Note: second film)); France Perras (Westwood (Note: DBZ, ep. 269 [254 edited] on)); Kristin Nowosad (Blue Water); Leda Davies (Blue Water (Note: Dragon Ball)); Sharon Mann (AB Groupe)

In-universe information
- Species: Human
- Gender: Female
- Occupation: Inventor, engineer, and CEO of Capsule Corporation
- Family: Dr. Brief (father); Panchy (mother); Tights (older sister)
- Spouse: Vegeta (husband)
- Children: Trunks (son); Bulla (daughter)
- Relatives: King Vegeta (father-in-law, deceased); Tarble (brother-in-law); Vegeta Jr. (descendant; Dragon Ball GT)

Bulma (Japanese: ブルマ, Hepburn: Buruma) is a fictional character in the Dragon Ball franchise, first appearing in the original manga series created by Akira Toriyama, Goku's first friend and the eventual wife of Vegeta and mother of Trunks and Bulla. She made her appearance in the first chapter "Bulma and Son Goku", published in Weekly Shōnen Jump magazine on 19 June 1984, issue 51, meeting Goku and befriending him and traveling together to find the wish-granting Dragon Balls.

Bulma is the daughter of Dr. Brief, the founder of Capsule Corporation, a company that creates special small capsules that shrink and hold objects of various sizes for easy storage. Being the daughter of a brilliant scientist, Bulma is also a scientific genius, as well as an inventor and engineer. Along with creating the Dragon Radar, a device that detects the energy signal emitted by a Dragon Ball, Bulma's role as an inventor becomes important at several points in the series; including the time machine that brings her future son Trunks to the past.

== Creation and design ==
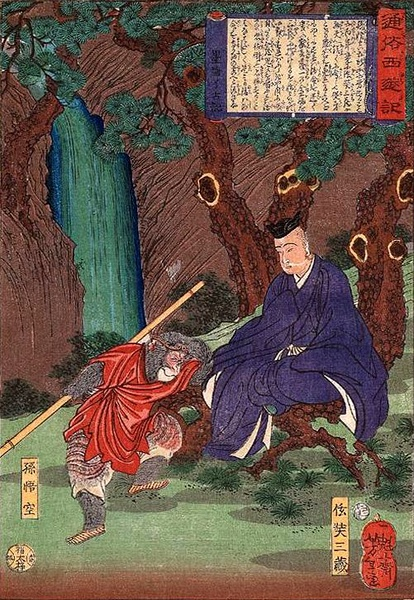
The relationship between Bulma and Goku is analogous to Wu Cheng'en's depiction of the dynamic between Sun Wukong and Tang Sanzang.

Bulma is loosely based on the character Tang Sanzang from the Chinese classic novel Journey to the West. Bulma and Goku were the first pair of characters which were introduced in the manga and Toriyama stated that he subsequently introduced other characters in pairs because "that way, I'm able to explain the characters and their relationship to each other through their interactions. In my case, I feel that it isn't good to insert too much narration. I suppose Goku and Bulma are representative of that." He further added that "as a child, Goku doesn't know anything [of the world], so without Bulma, he'd be a character who didn't say anything." The author also claimed that when the series started, his editor at the time, Kazuhiko Torishima, wanted Bulma and Goku to form a romantic relationship.

Bulma's appearance in the series is not as consistent as the other characters as she often changes her hairstyle and clothing, being fashion-conscious. Her hair is usually depicted in a shade of fuchsia, although in the first chapter and the anime, her hair is turquoise. When asked about the first time Bulma's hairstyle changed, Toriyama said it was to show that three years had passed and because he personally liked girls with short hair. She sometimes wears clothing with either her name on it or the Capsule Corporation logo.

Her name "Buruma" is the Japanese pronunciation of "bloomer", a type of gym shorts worn by Japanese girls at school. As with most characters in the Dragon Ball series, Bulma's name is consistent with those of the rest of her family. All of Bulma's family members are named after underclothing of some sort. Her father's name is Dr. Brief, while her son and daughter are named Trunks and Bra (ブラ, Bura; "Bulla" in the English anime dub) respectively. Her mother is never named in the original series, being referred to only as "Bulma's Mother" (ブルマのママ, Buruma no Mama). However, when asked in 2004 what name he would choose if he were to name her mother, Toriyama suggested Panchy (パンチー, Panchī), a pun on panties. However, in the video game, Dragon Ball Z: Kakarot, Bulma's mother's name was revealed as Bikini (ビキニ, Bikini). Toriyama stated in an interview that Bulma's family has a "laissez-faire attitude, but Bulma has complete control over things."

=== Voice actors ===
Bulma was voiced by Hiromi Tsuru in all Japanese media until her death in November 2017. As a new voice actress at the time, she had to audition for the part. She also said that all her previous roles were well-behaved characters, but Bulma was easy to play because she is down-to-earth. In February 2018, Aya Hisakawa was announced as the new voice actress for Bulma.

In Funimation's in house English dub, Bulma is voiced by Tiffany Vollmer in the original Dragon Ball series. After Vollmer retired from voice acting, she was replaced by Monica Rial starting from Dragon Ball Z Kai.

=== Characterization ===
Bulma's appearance in the anime is slightly different from the manga. In the manga version, her hair color is violet, while in the anime it is turquoise. Her long hairstyle stays shoulder-length as a teenager. She changes her hairstyle and cuts very often, and rarely wears the same dress for long periods. Many of the dresses that she wears bear her name or the Capsule Corporation logo.

Bulma is presented as an extraordinarily intelligent individual, being able to create technology capable of feats beyond contemporary science. She usually displays strong analytical skills and the ability to recognize design and engineering styles. Although not a martial artist, Bulma occasionally defends herself with the use of firearms and other technological equipment. Like Goku, Bulma does not display the conventional heroic traits of helping others; Her selfishness is highlighted in her wishes with the Dragon Balls and her decision to leave Goku behind from a collapsing sea cave. In contrast, the Bulma of Future Trunks' dimension is characterised as selfless, shown by her decision to sacrifice herself to save Trunks from Goku Black. Bulma is also characterised as being courageous and straightforward, often choosing to accompany Goku into dangerous situations and criticising people for their wrongdoings.

== Appearances ==
=== Dragon Ball ===
A teenaged Bulma as depicted in the character's first appearance.

Bulma is introduced as the teenage inventor of the Dragon Radar (ドラゴンレーダー, Doragon Rēdā), a device used to detect the Dragon Balls that she is searching for. She was hoping to use the Dragon Balls to wish for the perfect boyfriend. While searching for a nearby Dragon Ball, she runs into Goku and finds out that he inherited the four-star Dragon Ball from his adoptive father Grandpa Son Gohan. Because of Goku's love for the ball and his belief that his Grandpa's spirit lives in the ball, Goku is not willing to give it up. Bulma then asks him to loan it to her in exchange for taking him on her travels. At that point, they team up to find the remainder of the balls and the adventure begins.

As the search progresses, Bulma and Goku meet Master Roshi after finding his pet turtle; Oolong, a shapeshifting pig who is terrorizing a village; and Yamcha, and his shapeshifting cat companion Pu'ar, a desert bandit who Bulma soon finds herself attracted to, and who she eventually starts a romantic relationship with.

=== Dragon Ball Z ===
After five years of peace, an evil menace comes to the Earth. It is Goku's elder brother, an extraterrestrial Saiyan named Raditz. After Goku and Piccolo kill him, Bulma takes the Scouter (スカウター, Sukautā) from Raditz and fixes it to find the power levels of people in human numbers. During the subsequent battle against Vegeta and Nappa, Yamcha, Tien Shinhan, Chiaotzu and Piccolo are killed, and because Piccolo dies, the Dragon Balls are rendered useless.

After Goku defeats the Saiyans, Bulma volunteers to travel to Piccolo's home planet, Namek, and use the Namekian Dragon Balls to restore Yamcha and the others back to life. In need of a spaceship, Mr. Popo reveals one to Bulma, which had been the ship Kami had used to travel to Earth when he was a boy. She repairs the ship with the help of her father and flies off to Namek with Krillin and Son Gohan. After Goku defeats the tyrant Frieza, Yamcha and the others who were killed are revived by Porunga, the dragon of the Namekian Dragon Balls. Vegeta returns to Earth, staying with Bulma and her family.

Several years before the arrival of the Androids, Bulma ends her relationship with Yamcha and begins a relationship with Vegeta that leads to the birth of their son, Trunks. She used Dr. Gero's stolen blueprints to build a detonator to destroy the Androids, but Krillin broke it after realizing his feelings for Android 18. With her father's help, Bulma later repairs Android 16 before the Tournament of Martial Arts.

In the alternate future timeline, Bulma survives the Androids' onslaught and lives at the former site of Capsule Corp. She spends most of her life devoted to building a time machine, attempting to prevent the devastation brought by the Androids. She is very protective of Trunks and hates the idea of him fighting, but nevertheless allows him to travel to the past to deliver Goku an antidote for a heart virus that claimed his life in the alternate timeline. Once the Androids (or more importantly, Cell) are taken care of in the main timeline, Trunks returns to his original time and defeats the much weaker Androids and Cell with ease, thus restoring peace to the future timeline world.

Seven years after the battle against the Androids, Bulma helps Gohan by making a watch which automatically changes his clothes into a superhero costume so he could fight crime, without his real identity being known. She and the other heroes, except for Goku, Vegeta, Tien, Chiaotzu, and Gohan, hide at Kami's from the monstrous Majin Buu, however, she is killed when Buu turns her into chocolate and eats her. Bulma is revived by the Porunga, along with the rest of the Earth, and gives her energy to Goku to eliminate Majin Buu once and for all. Many years later, she gives birth to her and Vegeta's daughter, Bulla.

=== Dragon Ball Super ===
Before Bulla's birth, during the events of Dragon Ball Z: Battle of Gods and the first half of the first season of Dragon Ball Super, Bulma hosts a party with the prize being the Dragon Balls and unknowingly provoked the Destroyer God Beerus into nearly destroying Earth when she slapped him for ruining the event. She would soon learn of the resurrected Frieza's advance on Earth from her old friend Jaco (ティリメンテンピボッシ • ジャコ, Tirimentenpibosshi Jako) during the second half of the first season and Dragon Ball Z: Resurrection 'F', narrowly escapes being when Frieza destroys Earth thanks to Whis rewinding the event so he can quickly be killed.

After Frieza's defeat, she creates the Super Dragon Radar to find the Super Dragon Balls in Universe 7 first to prevent Beerus from using them to wish for the total annihilation of the entire universe. The alternate timeline version of Bulma is killed by Goku Black. After Bulma reunites with Trunks, Bulma works on a time machine to send him back to his timeline to defeat Goku Black. After an unsuccessful attempt, Bulma travels with them to the timeline, showing Trunks a recording of Piccolo performing the Evil Containment Wave and fighting with and being injured by Zamasu. Bulma tries creating a time machine, only for Beerus to destroy it and she later summons Beerus to quell a perceived threat from Arale and then satisfies his taste by using Senbei's Reality Machine and viewers of the award ceremony she was attending to imagine the most tasteful food they could think of.

In the Universe Survival Saga, Bulma agreed to pay 100 million Zeni to every member of Team Universe 7 who participated in the Tournament of Power if their team wins. It is also revealed that Bulla's birth is the result of Whis using his divine powers to hasten her conception, allowing Vegeta to participate in the tournament without worry. She later accompanies Goku and Vegeta during the events of Dragon Ball Super: Broly when Frieza is trying to use Earth's Dragon Balls, revealed to have been using the wishes as a form of cosmetic surgery to maintain her youthful appearance. Following the event, as revealed in Dragon Ball Super: Super Hero, Bulma established a branch of Capsule Corp to acquire the Dragon Balls for her so they would not fall into evil hands.

=== In Toriyama's films ===
Bulma appears in eight Dragon Ball Z films; in the first movie, Bulma makes a brief appearance when using the Dragon Radar to find Gohan after his abduction by Garlic Jr.'s henchman; in the second, she is used as leverage by Kochin to get Master Roshi to come back to the lair of Dr. Wheelo, where she is forced to accompany him as well; in the third, she is seen camping with Oolong and Krillin before the Tree of Might is planted and later appears at Goku's home; in the fourth, Bulma's mind is probed by Lord Slug to aid in his quest to secure the Dragon Balls, her losing consciousness thereafter; in the eighth, she makes a small appearance at the beginning, attending a picnic with the other characters; in the ninth, Bulma watches a fighting tournament with Chi-Chi and Trunks and argues with Chi-Chi; in the twelfth, Bulma gathers the Dragon Balls to send the souls of the deceased back to Other World; in the thirteenth, Bulma creates a room for Tapion who she confronts over the friendship he has established with her son.

=== In other media ===
Before the debut of the Dragon Ball anime, Bulma made her first anime debut in the film, Remember My Love in the Urusei Yatsura series, released on 26 January 1985, albeit in a cameo role.

In filler episodes of Dragon Ball Z, during the Namek arc, Bulma travels to a fake Namek. While on Namek, she meets Captain Ginyu after his defeat by Goku, which results in him switching bodies with a frog. Because she does not know the frog's true identity, she bonds with him, leading her to create a machine for him to communicate with her. Ginyu uses the machine to utter the name of his technique Body Change, allowing him to switch bodies with Bulma and leave her trapped in the frog's body. Bulma manages to stay around him as he looks for Frieza, and the two encounter Gohan, Krillin, and Piccolo while they are watching Goku and Frieza fight. Gohan realizes the change just as Ginyu attempts to switch bodies with Piccolo, and Bulma receives her body back when Gohan throws her in the way of the technique. Bulma is then blown away from the battlefield and later uses Ginyu to try to find out how the battle is progressing. During the Garlic Jr. arc, Bulma falls under the control of the Black Water Mist, leading her to attack her unaffected friends, being freed of the condition later on.

In Dragon Ball GT, she becomes possessed by Baby, who takes her as his apparent queen (or second in command), as possessing Vegeta gave him all of his memories and emotions. During this time, she organizes the migration to Planet Vegeta (renamed Planet Tuffle), and creates the Super Bruits Wave Generator (超ブルーツ波発生装置, Chō Burūtsuha Hassei Sōchi) that helps Baby become the Saiyan's Golden Great Ape transformation. However, the Holy Water hidden in Dende's Lookout is used to free her and the rest of Earth from Baby's enslavement. Later, she helps Vegeta reach Super Saiyan 4 by exposing him to a new Super Bruits Wave Generator, and witnesses Omega Shenron's defeat at the hands of Goku.

Bulma usually appears as a non-playable character in cut scenes for most Dragon Ball video games, such as Advanced Adventure, Budokai and Budokai 3. However, she is a playable character in Dragon Ball: Origins and its sequel. In Dragon Power, the North American version of Dragon Ball: Shenlong no Nazo that removes all references to Dragon Ball, her character was named "Nora". In Budokai 2, Bulma sells capsules in the Skill Shop. In Dragon Ball Z: Budokai Tenkaichi, Bulma appears in the Options Mode explaining how the various game settings work. In Budokai Tenkaichi 2, she appears in the data center, explaining about custom characters and in practice mode. Bulma is a Help Koma in Jump Ultimate Stars; giving more SP for collected coins to the Battle Koma she is attached to. Though she does not appear in Dragon Ball: Xenoverse, she is mentioned during the story mode fight against Beerus as having slapped him, as the fight is based on the film Dragon Ball Z: Battle of Gods. Bulma is an assist character in Dragon Ball Z: Extreme Butōden, firing a gun.

Bulma has been portrayed by Jeannie Hsieh in the unofficial live-action Dragon Ball movie Dragon Ball: The Magic Begins. She was also featured in the 1990 unofficial Korean adaptation, where she was played by Lee Ju Hee. Bulma appeared in the live-action film Dragonball Evolution, portrayed by Emmy Rossum. Rossum described her portrayal of Bulma in Dragonball Evolution as "pretty bad-ass, but still quirky and fun, and kind of ridiculous in the way she is in the anime."

Bulma has a cameo in the 2006 Dragon Ball and One Piece crossover, Cross Epoch. She is partnered up with the character Nami and the two act as a pair of space pirates. In the final chapter of Toriyama's 2013 manga series Jaco the Galactic Patrolman, it is revealed that the series is set before Dragon Ball, and Bulma makes an appearance as a child, as do her father and mother. The character Tights (タイツ, Taitsu), is actually revealed to be Bulma's older sister. To promote the 2015 Resurrection 'F' movie, a blog run by Bulma was launched on the website Ameblo.

== Reception ==
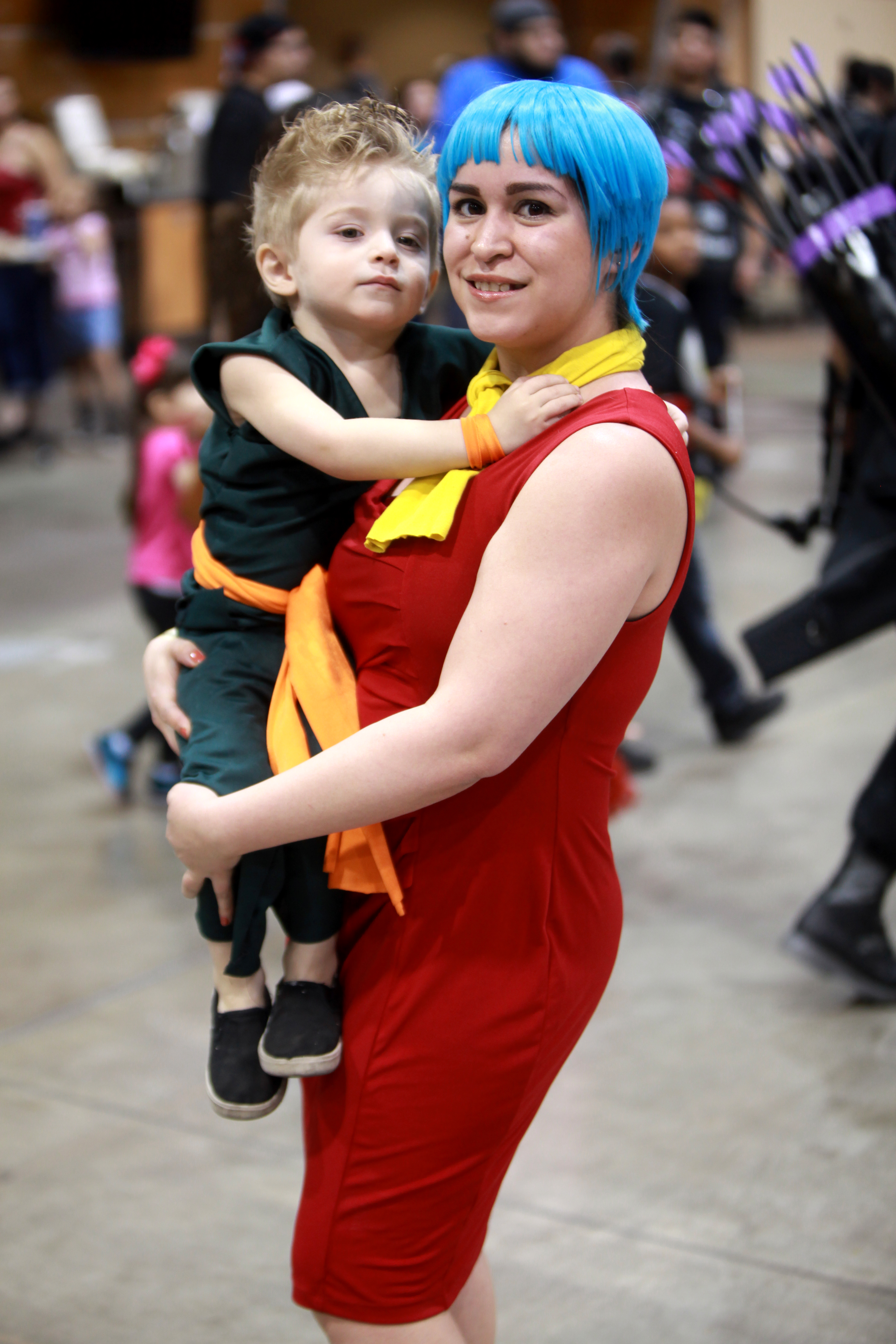
Cosplay of an older Bulma as the mother of Trunks

Brian Camp and Julie Davis, the authors of Anime Classics Zettai!: 100 Must-See Japanese Animation Masterpieces, noted that Bulma's character went through the greatest number of changes in the series, and praised the evolution of her character from a "brassy, boy-crazy teen girl" in the earliest episodes of Dragon Ball to winding up as one of the matriarchs of the group. They further added that while Goku is the heart and soul of the group, Bulma is its body, the one who gives it structure and cohesion.

Bulma's voice actress, Hiromi Tsuru, said she liked Bulma, describing the character as "energetic" and "cheeky." She also joked that it was difficult for her to love Vegeta, having thought Bulma would end up with Yamcha. In a top ten list for IGN, David Smith ranked Bulma forming a relationship with Vegeta as the top plot twist of Dragon Ball Z.

== See also ==
- List of Dragon Ball characters
