= Dragon Ball Z: Dead Zone =

- Theatrical release poster

Japanese name
- Kana: ドラゴンボールZ
Transcriptions
- Revised Hepburn: Doragon Bōru Zetto
- Directed by: Daisuke Nishio
- Screenplay by: Takao Koyama
- Based on: Dragon Ball by Akira Toriyama
- Starring: see below
- Cinematography: Motoaki Ikegami
- Edited by: Shinichi Fukumitsu
- Music by: Shunsuke Kikuchi
- Production company: Toei Animation
- Distributed by: Toei Company
- Release date: July 15, 1989 (Japan)
- Running time: 42 minutes
- Country: Japan
- Language: Japanese
- Box office: ¥1.36 billion (est.)

Dragon Ball Z: Dead Zone (Note: Originally released theatrically in Japan as simply Dragon Ball Z and later as Dragon Ball Z: Return My Gohan!! (Japanese: ドラゴンボールZ オラの悟飯をかえせッ!!, Hepburn: Doragon Bōru Zetto Ora no Gohan o Kaese!!) for its Japanese VHS and Laserdisc release) is a 1989 Japanese anime fantasy martial arts film, the fourth installment in the Dragon Ball film series, and the first under the Dragon Ball Z moniker. It was originally released in Japan on July 15 at the "Toei Manga Matsuri" film festival along with the 1989 film version of Himitsu no Akko-chan, the first Akuma-kun film, and the film version of Kidou Keiji Jiban. It was preceded by Dragon Ball: Mystical Adventure and followed by Dragon Ball Z: The World's Strongest.

Despite continuity inconsistencies, Dead Zone acts as a prelude to the Dragon Ball Z television series and is the only film to get a follow-up within the series, that being the Garlic Jr. arc which takes place between Frieza and Android arcs. The canonicity of this arc is debated as it does not appear in the original manga.

== Plot ==
Almost five years following his defeat by Goku at the 23rd World Martial Arts Tournament, Piccolo Jr. trains alone when he is caught in an ambush by a group of mysterious warriors. Chi-Chi, along with her father Ox King and son, Gohan, are attacked by the same group while her husband Goku is away fishing. He senses the danger his family faces and returns to find that his son has been abducted.

The impish Garlic Jr. is responsible for the attack so that he could retrieve the four-star Dragon Ball that was attached to Gohan's hat. Garlic Jr. senses an immense power within Gohan, and decides to make him his pupil rather than kill him. After gathering the remaining six magical Dragon Balls, Garlic Jr. summons the eternal dragon Shenron and he wishes for immortality. Goku prepares to rescue his son when Kami, Earth's guardian, arrives and explains that centuries prior, he and Garlic Jr.'s father, Garlic, competed for the position of Guardian of the Earth and Kami was victorious. In revenge, Garlic unleashed a demonic horde onto the Earth until Kami defeated him and ended the invasion. Goku proceeds to search for Gohan when he is attacked by the villain's henchmen while Kami faces Garlic Jr.

Krillin and Piccolo Jr. arrive with the latter defeating henchman Sansho while Goku manages to defeat the other two henchmen, Ginger and Nicky. Meanwhile, Kami is bested by Garlic Jr. until Goku and Piccolo Jr. rescue him. With Garlic Jr.'s newly obtained immortality and a new, muscular form, Goku and Piccolo Jr. are forced to work together and are able to eventually defeat him. Still possessing disdain for one another and mistakenly believing Garlic Jr. to be dead, Goku and Piccolo Jr. prepare to fight when Garlic Jr. opens up a portal into another dimension; a void of darkness known as the Dead Zone. Gohan becomes enraged as he witnesses his father and friends in danger and releases his latent power, hurdling Garlic Jr. into his own vortex to be trapped for all eternity. Kami deduces that by being trapped in the Dead Zone, Garlic Jr. regrets ever gaining immortality. Unable to recall the events, Gohan believes that his father defeated Garlic Jr. while Goku realizes his son has amazing hidden potential. Piccolo Jr. vows to defeat Goku while watching him and his friends depart.

== Cast ==
| Character name | Voice actor | | | |
| Character name | Japanese | English | | |
| Character name | Japanese | Pioneer/Funimation/Ocean Studios (1997) | Unknown/AB Groupe (c. 2003) | Funimation (2005) |
|---|---|---|---|---|
| Goku | Masako Nozawa | Peter Kelamis | David Gasman | Sean Schemmel |
| Gohan | Masako Nozawa | Saffron Henderson | Jodi Forrest | Stephanie Nadolny |
| Piccolo | Toshio Furukawa | Scott McNeil | Big Green | Christopher Sabat |
| Piccolo | Toshio Furukawa | Scott McNeil | David Gasman^{*} | Christopher Sabat |
| Kami | Takeshi Aono | Ward Perry | (Green) God | Christopher Sabat |
| Kami | Takeshi Aono | Ward Perry | Ed Marcus | Christopher Sabat |
| Kuririn | Mayumi Tanaka | Krillin | Clearin | Krillin |
| Kuririn | Mayumi Tanaka | Terry Klassen | Sharon Mann | Sonny Strait |
| Garlic Jr. (ガーリックJr., Gārikku Junia) | Akira Kamiya | Don Brown | Doug Rand | Chuck Huber |
| Ginger (ジンジャー, Jinjā) | Kōji Totani | Terry Klassen | Ed Marcus (some lines); David Gasman | Troy Baker |
| Nicky (ニッキー, Nikkī) | Shigeru Chiba | Paul Dobson | Ed Marcus | Doug Burks |
| Sansho (サンショ) | Yukitoshi Hori | Ward Perry | Doug Rand; David Gasman (one line); Ed Marcus (one line) | Eric Dillow |
| Ox King | Daisuke Gōri | Dave Ward | David Gasman | Kyle Hebert^{**} |
| Chi-Chi | Mayumi Shō | Lisa Ann Beley | Sharon Mann | Cynthia Cranz |
| Shenlong | Kenji Utsumi | Shenron | Sacred Dragon | Shenron |
| Shenlong | Kenji Utsumi | Don Brown | Ed Marcus | Christopher Sabat |
| Bulma | Hiromi Tsuru | Lalainia Lindbjerg | Bloomer | Tiffany Vollmer |
| Bulma | Hiromi Tsuru | Lalainia Lindbjerg | Sharon Mann | Tiffany Vollmer |
| Kame-Sen'nin | Kōhei Miyauchi | Master Roshi | Ed Marcus | Master Roshi |
| Kame-Sen'nin | Kōhei Miyauchi | Don Brown | Ed Marcus | Mike McFarland |
| Narrator | Jōji Yanami | Doc Harris | —N/a | Kyle Hebert |

^*Toshio Furukawa's voice from the original Japanese version is retained in the AB Groupe dub at the beginning of this film, when Piccolo screams and destroys a large rock formation.

^**In Funimation's English credits, Christopher Sabat is miscredited as playing the Ox King, a mistake carried over to the 2006 dub of The World's Strongest.

== Music ==
- OP (Opening Theme):
  - "Cha-La Head-Cha-La"
    - Lyrics by Yukinojō Mori
    - Music by Chiho Kiyooka
    - Arranged by Kenji Yamamoto
    - Performed by Hironobu Kageyama
- IN (Insert Song):
  - "The World's Greatest Gohan" (天下一ゴハン, Tenka'ichi Gohan)
    - Lyrics by Sakiko Iwamuro
    - Music by Takeshi Ike
    - Arranged by Kenji Yamamoto
    - Performed by Masako Nozawa
- ED (Ending Theme):
  - "Come Out, Incredible Zenkai Power!" (でてこいとびきりZENKAIパワー!, Detekoi Tobikiri Zenkai Pawā!)
    - Lyrics by Naruhisa Arakawa
    - Music by Takeshi Ike
    - Arranged by Kenji Yamamoto
    - Performed by Manna

=== English dub soundtracks ===
The 1997 Pioneer release kept the original Japanese music.

There is a discrepancy that states the 2005 English dub score was composed by Mark Menza, which it was not. It was composed by Nathan Johnson. The Double Feature release that came out 3 years later in 2008 contains an alternate audio track containing the English dub with original Japanese background music by Shunsuke Kikuchi and an ending theme of "Come Out, Incredible Zenkai Power!".

== Box office ==
At the Japanese box office, the film sold 2.2 million tickets and earned a net distribution rental income of ¥800 million.

== International releases ==
=== North America ===
The film was licensed in North America by Funimation Entertainment and the home video rights were sub-licensed to Pioneer Entertainment. Pioneer was released on VHS, LaserDisc, and DVD on December 17, 1997. They used the same voice cast as the TV series did at the time, and was dubbed by Ocean Productions. They released the film as Dead Zone. As a feature on the Pioneer DVD, deleted scenes from the original episodes 1 and 9 are shown in Japanese with English subtitles, as these two episodes were yet to be dubbed in full at the time. Later, on August 13, 2013, Funimation released the Rock the Dragon Edition DVD set, which contained an edited version of the Ocean dub of this film, as well as The World's Strongest and The Tree of Might, as they aired on Toonami, along with the 53 edited episodes of the TV series.

Once their sub-license expired, Funimation released the film on DVD in the "Ultimate Uncut Edition" on May 31, 2005, with a completely new dub done by Funimation's voice cast and a feature film audio commentary. They also re-released the film on November 14, 2006, as part of a DVD set subtitled "First Strike", also containing The World's Strongest and The Tree of Might. It was later released in a double feature set along with The World's Strongest on Blu-ray and DVD on May 27, 2008, both featuring full 1080p format in HD remastered 16:9 aspect ratio and an enhanced 5.1 surround mix. The film was re-released on DVD in remastered thinpak collection on November 1, 2011, containing the first five Dragon Ball Z films.

=== Europe and Malaysia ===
AB Groupe, a French company that holds the license to the Dragon Ball franchise in most of Europe, licensed and dubbed the film, which they re-titled In Pursuit of Garlic. This dub featured a voice cast that was unknown for years, but it is now believed that English-speaking voice actors in France were involved with this dub. In Pursuit of Garlic aired on TV in the Netherlands, the United Kingdom, and Ireland, and was sold on DVD in the Netherlands by Bridge Entertainment Group in 2003.

Speedy Video, a Malaysian-based company, released the film on Video CD, here subtitled The Vengeance of the Demon King. Speedy also released the Pioneer English adaptation on VCD.

== Critical reception ==
GameFan magazine reviewed the DVD release in 1998 and gave it a B− rating.
