= Dragon Ball Z: The World's Strongest =

- Theatrical release poster
- Directed by: Daisuke Nishio
- Screenplay by: Takao Koyama
- Based on: Dragon Ball by Akira Toriyama
- Starring: See below
- Cinematography: Motoaki Ikegami
- Edited by: Shinichi Fukumitsu
- Music by: Shunsuke Kikuchi
- Production company: Toei Animation
- Distributed by: Toei Company
- Release date: March 10, 1990 (Japan)
- Running time: 58 Minutes
- Country: Japan
- Language: Japanese
- Box office: ¥1.70 billion

Dragon Ball Z: The World's Strongest (Japanese: ドラゴンボールZ この世で一番強いヤツ, Hepburn: Doragon Bōru Zetto Kono Yo de Ichiban Tsuyoi Yatsu) (Note: Also known by Toei's own English title The Strongest Guy in the World.) is a 1990 Japanese animated science fiction martial arts film and the second feature film in the Dragon Ball Z franchise. It was originally released in Japan on March 10 between episodes 39 and 40 of DBZ, at the "Toei Manga Matsuri" film festival along with the second Akuma-kun film (Welcome to Devil Land) and the 1990 film version of Sally the Witch. It was preceded by Dragon Ball Z: Dead Zone and followed by Dragon Ball Z: The Tree of Might.

== Plot ==
Gohan and Oolong search for the magical Dragon Balls and their radar shows them that the orbs are being gathered by another, unknown party. They investigate near a large wall of ice where Piccolo is training. Meanwhile, the mad scientist Dr. Kochin, having successfully gathered all of the Dragon Balls, summons the eternal dragon Shenron and wishes for Dr. Wheelo and his lab to be released from the ice. The ice breaks away as a building emerges, and Gohan and Oolong are attacked by Dr. Kochin's "bio-men". Piccolo saves them, but is overcome by three mysterious warriors while Gohan and Oolong escape.

Dr. Kochin and his bio-men soon present themselves to Master Roshi, who refuses to accompany them to Wheelo's lab and defeats the bio-men. Dr. Kochin kidnaps Bulma to force Master Roshi to pursue them. At Wheelo's lab, Master Roshi is forced to fight three "bio-warriors" but is swiftly defeated. Bulma discovers that Dr. Wheelo's mission is to obtain the body of the strongest warrior on Earth to become the host for his brain, which is currently separated from his deceased body and kept alive by his advanced technology. Bulma informs him that Goku will undoubtedly be coming to rescue them and that he is much stronger than Roshi.

Meanwhile, Goku learns of the situation, arrives at Dr. Wheelo's lab, and is confronted by Mikokatsun, Kishime, and Ebifurya – Dr. Kochin's three bio-warrior henchmen. Goku defeats Mikokatsun but is frozen by an ice-like attack launched by Ebifurya. Gohan and Krillin arrive to help, but are no match for Kishime. Goku breaks free from ice with his Kaio-ken technique, defeats the two remaining bio-warriors, and confronts Dr. Wheelo. Piccolo, who Dr. Wheelo has brainwashed, attacks Goku. Gohan tries to stop Piccolo but fails, causing his anger to explode and shatter Dr. Wheelo's brainwashing device. Dr. Wheelo is stunned by Gohan's power and desires to steal his body instead. He breaks his robot body free from the ice wall, subsequently knocking Dr. Kochin down a shaft, which kills him.

Dr. Wheelo attacks and overwhelms the fighters, leaving only Goku and Piccolo to oppose him. Goku knocks Dr. Wheelo into the atmosphere and begins to form a Spirit Bomb attack. Wheelo interrupts him before he can finish gathering the energy, requiring Goku's allies to distract him. Goku successfully launches the bomb, and Wheelo is killed.

== Cast ==
Character name	Voice actor			
Character name	Japanese	English		
Character name	Japanese	Pioneer/Funimation/Ocean Studios (1998)	Unknown/AB Groupe (c. 2001)	Funimation (2006)
Goku	Masako Nozawa	Peter Kelamis	David Gasman; Ed Marcus (some vocal effects)	Sean Schemmel
Gohan	Masako Nozawa	Saffron Henderson	Jodi Forrest	Stephanie Nadolny
Piccolo	Toshio Furukawa	Scott McNeil	Big Green	Christopher Sabat
Piccolo	Toshio Furukawa	Scott McNeil	Paul Bandey; Doug Rand (one scream)	Christopher Sabat
Bulma	Hiromi Tsuru	Lalainia Lindbjerg	Bloomer	Tiffany Vollmer
Bulma	Hiromi Tsuru	Lalainia Lindbjerg	Sharon Mann	Tiffany Vollmer
Kuririn	Mayumi Tanaka	Krillin	Clearin	Krillin
Kuririn	Mayumi Tanaka	Terry Klassen	Sharon Mann	Sonny Strait
Oolong	Naoki Tatsuta	Alec Willows	David Gasman	Brad Jackson
Chi-Chi	Mayumi Shou	Lisa Ann Beley	Sharon Mann	Cynthia Cranz
Kame-Sen'nin	Kōhei Miyauchi	Master Roshi	The Old One	Master Roshi
Kame-Sen'nin	Kōhei Miyauchi	Don Brown	Ed Marcus	Mike McFarland
Turtle	Daisuke Gōri	Scott McNeil	Doug Rand	Christopher Sabat
Shenlong	Kenji Utsumi	Shenron	Dragon	Shenron
Shenlong	Kenji Utsumi	Don Brown	Ed Marcus	Christopher Sabat
Dr. Kochin (Dr.コーチン, Dokutā Kōchin)	Kouji Yada	Paul Dobson	Paul Bandey	Troy Baker
Bio-Men (バイオマン, Baioman)	Kōzō Shioya; Naoki Tatsuta	Alec Willows	Doug Rand	Chris Cason; John Burgmeier
Ebifurya (エビフリャー, Ebifuryā)	Ken Yamaguchi	Don Brown	Paul Bandey	Matthew Tompkins
Kishime (キシーメ, Kishīme)	Yukimasa Kishino	Paul Dobson	Doug Rand	Chris Rager
Misokatsun (ミソカッツン, Misokattsun)	Daisuke Gōri	Ward Perry	Paul Bandey	Mikokatsun
Misokatsun (ミソカッツン, Misokattsun)	Daisuke Gōri	Ward Perry	Paul Bandey	Robert McCollum
Dr. Willow (Dr.ウイロー, Dokutā Uirō)	Kōji Nakata	Dr. Wheelo	Doug Rand	Dr. Wheelo
Dr. Willow (Dr.ウイロー, Dokutā Uirō)	Kōji Nakata	Ward Perry	Doug Rand	R. Bruce Elliott
Narrator	Jōji Yanami	Doc Harris	Ed Marcus	Kyle Hebert

Although the Ox-King does not appear in this film, the 2008 "remastered" version of the Funimation dub miscredits him as voiced by Christopher Sabat.

A fourth English dub, produced and released exclusively in Malaysia by Speedy Video, features an unknown voice cast.

== Music ==
- OP (Opening Theme):
  - "Cha-La Head-Cha-La"
    - Lyrics by Yukinojō Mori
    - Music by Chiho Kiyooka
    - Arranged by Kenji Yamamoto
    - Performed by Hironobu Kageyama
- IN (Insert Song):
  - "I Lo~ve Mr. Piccolo♡" (ピッコロさん だ〜いすき♡, Pikkoro-san Da~isuki♡)
    - Lyrics by Chiroru Taniho
    - Music by Takeshi Ike
    - Arranged by Kenji Yamamoto
    - Performed by Masako Nozawa
- ED (Ending Theme):
  - "The Battle" (戦（I・KU・SA）, Ikusa (I•KU•SA))
    - Lyrics by Dai Satō
    - Music by Takeshi Ike
    - Arranged by Kenji Yamamoto
    - Performed by Hironobu Kageyama

The score for the 2006 English dub was composed by Nathan Johnson.

== Box office ==
At the Japanese box office, the film sold 2.7 million tickets and earned a net distribution rental income of ¥1 billion.

Overseas in Europe, the film grossed $1,009,767 in Germany, Austria and Poland during 2002–2003.

== Releases ==
It was released on VHS and DVD in North America on May 26, 1998, with an English dub, produced by Pioneer Entertainment in association with Funimation. Pioneer's dub used the original Ocean Productions voice cast of the TV series. Since then, Funimation was released the Ocean dub of the film on the Rock the Dragon Edition DVD set on August 13, 2013, it has 53 edited episodes of the TV series, plus two edited films of Dead Zone and The Tree of Might as they aired on Toonami.

Once their sub-license expired, Funimation also released the film to DVD in "Ultimate Uncut Edition" on November 14, 2006, as part of a film set subtitled "First Strike", also containing Dead Zone (1989) and The Tree of Might (1990), with completely new dub done by Funimation's voice cast. It was later released in Double Feature set along with Dead Zone (1989) for Blu-ray and DVD on May 27, 2008, both feature full 1080p format in HD remastered 16:9 aspect ratio and an enhanced 5.1 surround mix. The film was re-released to DVD in remastered thinpak collection on November 1, 2011, containing the first 5 Dragon Ball Z films.

=== Other companies ===
Outside of the United States, there have been two other English dubs of this film: one in Malaysia and one by AB Groupe in France. The Malaysian English dub was released to VCD in Malaysia, while AB Groupe's English dub aired on TV in the Netherlands, the United Kingdom, and Ireland, as well as seeing a home release to VHS and DVD in some of the formerly mentioned countries. Both dubs use Toei's official English title rather than Funimation's title, and until recently, the voice cast of the AB Groupe dub version was unknown, but then it has been determined that they used voice actors who were involved in French TV shows like Code Lyoko, while the Malaysian dub's cast remains unknown.
