= Dragon Ball Z: The Tree of Might =

- Theatrical release poster
- Directed by: Daisuke Nishio
- Screenplay by: Takao Koyama
- Based on: Dragon Ball by Akira Toriyama
- Starring: See below
- Cinematography: Motoaki Ikegami
- Edited by: Shinichi Fukumitsu
- Music by: Shunsuke Kikuchi
- Production company: Toei Animation
- Distributed by: Toei Company
- Release date: July 7, 1990 (Japan)
- Running time: 65 minutes
- Country: Japan
- Box office: ¥1.36 billion (est.)

Dragon Ball Z: The Tree of Might, known in Japan as Dragon Ball Z: Chikyū Marugoto Chōkessen (Japanese: ドラゴンボールZ 地球まるごと超決戦; lit. 'Dragon Ball Z: The Decisive Battle for the Whole Earth'), (Note: Also known by Toei's own English title Super Battle in the World.) is a 1990 Japanese anime science fantasy martial arts film and the third Dragon Ball Z feature film. It was originally released in Japan on July 7 between episodes 54 and 55 of DBZ, at the "Toei Anime Fair" film festival, where it was shown as part of an Akira Toriyama-themed triple feature titled Toriyama Akira: The World (the other two films were anime versions of his one-shot stories Kennosuke-sama and Pink). It was preceded by Dragon Ball Z: The World's Strongest and followed by Dragon Ball Z: Lord Slug.

== Plot ==
A forest fire interrupts a camping trip enjoyed by Gohan, Krillin, Bulma and Oolong. Gohan and Krillin manage to put out the fire and use the Dragon Balls to restore the forest and the animals killed by the inferno, and Gohan befriends a small dragon he names Icarus. Unbeknownst to the group, the fire was started by a probe sent by a Saiyan space pirate named Turles, who bears a striking resemblance to Goku and who has chosen the Earth to plant the tree of might, which absorbs the life of a planet and converts it into fruit that when eaten, gives the consumer a massive power increase. Turles' henchmen plant the seed, and King Kai telepathically warns Goku of the danger. He, Krillin, Yamcha, Tien Shinhan, and Chiaotzu attempt to destroy the tree using energy blasts but fail. Turles' henchmen attack and overwhelm them. The Earth begins to succumb to the devastation of the tree's life absorption as water vanishes, and plants and animals perish.

After Gohan fights back against the henchmen, Turles enters the fray after realizing Gohan is half-Saiyan and deduces that he is Goku's son, who he states is from the same class of Saiyan warrior, and thus explains their similar appearances. Gohan impresses Turles with his power level and invites him to join his conquest. Still, he refuses and attempts to fight Turles before Piccolo intervenes to rescue him. Turles forces Piccolo to protect Gohan, and the Namekian is dispatched. Upon noticing Gohan's regrown tail, Turles creates an artificial moon and forces Gohan to observe it, causing him to transform into a great ape (oozaru), who attacks Goku but is calmed by the appearance of Icarus. Turles injures Icarus with an energy blast, causing Gohan to go into a frenzy before Goku severs his son's tail with an energy disc, transforming him back to normal and saving him from Turles' incoming energy blasts. Goku kills Turles' henchmen and engages his evil doppelganger in battle.

Goku has the upper hand against Turles until he obtains a fully grown piece of fruit from the Tree of Might and consumes it. With the sudden surge of power, Turles overwhelms Goku until his allies come to his aid. As they fight Turles with limited success, Goku begins to form a Spirit Bomb, but the Earth, having been drained by the Tree of Might, does not have the energy left to fuel Goku's Spirit Bomb, which Turles destroys. However, the energy from the Tree of Might flows into Goku, allowing him to create another, more powerful Spirit Bomb. Goku confronts Turles underneath the tree's roots and blasts him directly with the attack, launching him up the tree and destroying them both.

The Earth begins to heal as the heroes celebrate their victory. Piccolo meditates alone by a waterfall.

== Cast ==
Character name	Voice actor				
Character name	Japanese	English			
Character name	Japanese	Saban/Funimation/Ocean Studios (1997)	Pioneer/Funimation/ Ocean Studios (1998)	Unknown/AB Groupe (c. 2001)	Funimation (2006)
Goku	Masako Nozawa	Ian James Corlett	Peter Kelamis	David Gasman	Sean Schemmel
Gohan	Masako Nozawa	Saffron Henderson	Saffron Henderson	Jodi Forrest	Stephanie Nadolny
Haiya Dragon (ハイヤードラゴン, Haiyā Doragon)	Naoki Tatsuta	Icarus	Doug Parker	Jodi Forrest	Icarus
Haiya Dragon (ハイヤードラゴン, Haiyā Doragon)	Naoki Tatsuta	Doug Parker	Doug Parker	Jodi Forrest	Christopher Sabat
Kuririn	Mayumi Tanaka	Krillin		Clearin	Krillin
Kuririn	Mayumi Tanaka	Terry Klassen	Terry Klassen	Sharon Mann	Sonny Strait
Yamcha	Tōru Furuya	Ted Cole	Ted Cole	Doug Rand	Christopher Sabat
Tenshinhan	Hirotaka Suzuoki	Tien Shinhan		Tenshin	Tien Shinhan
Tenshinhan	Hirotaka Suzuoki	Matthew Smith	Matthew Smith	Doug Rand	John Burgmeier
Chaozu	Hiroko Emori	Chiaotzu		Chaos	Chiaotzu
Chaozu	Hiroko Emori	Cathy Weseluck	Cathy Weseluck	Jodi Forrest; Ed Marcus (some grunts)	Monika Antonelli
Piccolo	Toshio Furukawa	Scott McNeil	Scott McNeil	Big Green	Christopher Sabat
Piccolo	Toshio Furukawa	Scott McNeil	Scott McNeil	Paul Bandey	Christopher Sabat
Tullece (ターレス, Tāresu)	Masako Nozawa	Turles		Turls/Talles	Turles
Tullece (ターレス, Tāresu)	Masako Nozawa	Ward Perry	Ward Perry	Ed Marcus	Chris Patton
Cacao (カカオ, Kakao)	Shinobu Satouchi	Alvin Sanders	Alvin Sanders	Paul Bandey	Jeff Johnson
Daiz (ダイーズ, Daīzu)	Yūji Machi	Scott McNeil	Scott McNeil	Ed Marcus	Mark Lancaster
Rasin (レズン, Rezun)	Kenji Utsumi	Don Brown	Scott McNeil	Twilight Twin #1	Robert McCollum
Rasin (レズン, Rezun)	Kenji Utsumi	Don Brown	Scott McNeil	Jodi Forrest	Robert McCollum
Lakasei (ラカセイ, Rakasei)	Masaharu Satō	Alec Willows	Don Brown	Twilight Twin #2	Robert McCollum
Lakasei (ラカセイ, Rakasei)	Masaharu Satō	Alec Willows	Don Brown	Sharon Mann	Robert McCollum
Amond (アモンド, Amondo)	Banjō Ginga	Paul Dobson	Paul Dobson	Paul Bandey	J. Paul Slavens
Shenlong	Kenji Utsumi	Eternal Dragon		Dragon	Shenron
Shenlong	Kenji Utsumi	Don Brown	Don Brown	Ed Marcus	Christopher Sabat
Chi-Chi	Mayumi Shō	Laara Sadiq	Laara Sadiq	Sharon Mann	Cynthia Cranz
Bulma	Hiromi Tsuru	Lalainia Lindbjerg	Lalainia Lindbjerg	Bloomer	Tiffany Vollmer
Bulma	Hiromi Tsuru	Lalainia Lindbjerg	Lalainia Lindbjerg	Sharon Mann	Tiffany Vollmer
Oolong	Naoki Tatsuta	Alec Willows	Scott McNeil	David Gasman	Brad Jackson
Pu-erh	Naoko Watanabe	Puar		Jodi Forrest	Puar
Pu-erh	Naoko Watanabe	Cathy Weseluck	Cathy Weseluck	Jodi Forrest	Monika Antonelli
Kame-Sennin	Kōhei Miyauchi	Master Roshi		Ed Marcus	Master Roshi
Kame-Sennin	Kōhei Miyauchi	Ian James Corlett	Don Brown	Ed Marcus	Mike McFarland
Kaiō	Jōji Yanami	King Kai		Paul Bandey	King Kai
Kaiō	Jōji Yanami	Don Brown	Don Brown	Paul Bandey	Sean Schemmel
Narrator	—N/a	Doc Harris^{*}	—N/a	—N/a	—N/a

=== Notes ===
^*The narration provided by Doc Harris for the 1997 version was cut out when this version was edited into a single-part film.

== Music ==
- OP (Opening Theme):
  - "Cha-La Head-Cha-La"
    - Lyrics by Yukinojō Mori.
    - Music by Chiho Kiyooka.
    - Arranged by Kenji Yamamoto.
    - Performed by Hironobu Kageyama.
- ED (Ending Theme):
  - Marugoto (まるごと, "The Whole World")
    - Lyrics by Dai Satō.
    - Music by Chiho Kiyooka.
    - Arranged by Kenji Yamamoto.
    - Performed by Hironobu Kageyama ft. Ammy.

Both songs were included on the 1990 compilation Akira Toriyama: The World.

=== English dub soundtracks ===
==== 1997 ====
- OP (Opening Theme):
  - "Rock the Dragon"
    - Performed by Jeremy Sweet.
- ED (Ending Theme):
  - "End Title"
    - Performed by Jeremy Sweet.

The score for the 1997 Saban TV version was composed by Ron Wasserman (although credited to Kussa Mahehi and Shuki Levy for contractual reasons). The background music and opening theme "Rock the Dragon" were recycled from his Saiyan / Namek Saga dub soundtrack.

==== 2006 ====
- OP (Opening Theme):
  - "Dragon Ball Z Movie Theme"
    - Performed by Mark Menza.
- ED (Ending Theme):
  - "Dragon Ball Z Movie Theme"
    - Performed by Mark Menza.

The score for the 2006 English dub's composed by Nathan Johnson. The Double Feature release contains an alternate audio track containing the English dub with original Japanese background music by Shunsuke Kikuchi, an opening theme of "Cha-La Head-Cha-La", and an ending theme of "Marugoto".

The 1998 Pioneer release, 2003 AB Groupe dub and Speedy Video dub all kept the original Japanese songs and background music.

== Content edits ==
The title card used for Saban's three "The Tree of Might" TV episodes from 1997.

Funimation's first dub of The Tree of Might done in association with Saban Entertainment and Ocean was heavily edited for content and length, just like their dub of Dragon Ball Z.

- In order to increase time for the film to be a three-part episode, several scenes from the series were added, such as when Shenron is summoned, when Turles, his henchmen, and Piccolo make their first appearances in the film, and most of King Kai's scenes.
- Blood was completely edited out in the film and the violence was toned down as well. For example, scenes where a character was punched or kicked hard were blocked by flashes of light.
- The scene where Turles forces Gohan to transform into a Great Ape by holding his face and forcing him to keep his eyes open was edited, having Turles hold him by his shoulders instead. At the same time when Gohan looks at the fake moon, no heartbeat sound effects existed in the Japanese and English uncut versions, but were digitally edited in background in the English edited version. During that same scene, when Gohan's tail grows out of his pants, the sound effect of it ripping through his pants were also edited.
- The scene where Turles has his foot on top of Goku was edited.
- The scenes where Gohan is nude after he reverts from his Great Ape form, were edited, but he was covered up by some means, such as adding extended lighting to the scene where Goku catches Gohan after cutting off his tail or adding a digital bush in front of him during the scene.

This dub edited the film into a three-part television episode, which first aired in North American countries during November 1997 as part of the show's second season.

In 2013, Funimation released the edited film on DVD of Rock the Dragon Edition, but instead of being presented in the episodic format in which it originally aired, it was presented as a stand-alone film on the final disc of the set.

== Box office ==
At the Japanese box office, the film sold 2.2 million tickets and earned a net distribution rental income of ¥800 million,.

== Releases ==
Funimation later sub-licensed the home video rights for the film to Pioneer Entertainment who, also in association with Ocean Productions, re-dubbed the film, and released it uncut on VHS and DVD on March 17, 1998, featuring the then-current English voice cast from the TV series, dialogue more accurately translated from the original Japanese script, and the original Japanese background music. Since then, Funimation released the edited film of Rock the Dragon Edition set with Ocean dub on DVD on August 13, 2013, it has 53 edited episodes of the TV series, plus two edited films of Dead Zone and The World's Strongest as they aired on Toonami.

Once their sub-license expired, Funimation also released the film to DVD in "Ultimate Uncut Edition" on November 14, 2006, as part of a film set subtitled "First Strike", also containing Dead Zone (1989) and The World's Strongest (1990), with completely new dub done by Funimation's voice cast. It was later released in Double Feature set along with Lord Slug (1991) for Blu-ray and DVD on September 16, 2008, both feature full 1080p format in HD remastered 16:9 aspect ratio and an enhanced 5.1 surround mix. The film was re-released to DVD in remastered thinpak collection on November 1, 2011, containing the first 5 Dragon Ball Z films.

== Other companies ==
Other English dubs were also made by French company AB Groupe and Malaysian company Speedy Video. These dubs, which are notorious for poor voice acting, were never released in North America. While the Malaysian dub's cast remains unknown, it has recently been discovered that English-speaking actors living in France were involved in the AB Groupe dub. Some of these voice actors were also speculated to have dubbed animated shows produced in France, such as Code Lyoko and Chris Colorado.
