= Tiffany Vollmer =

American actress

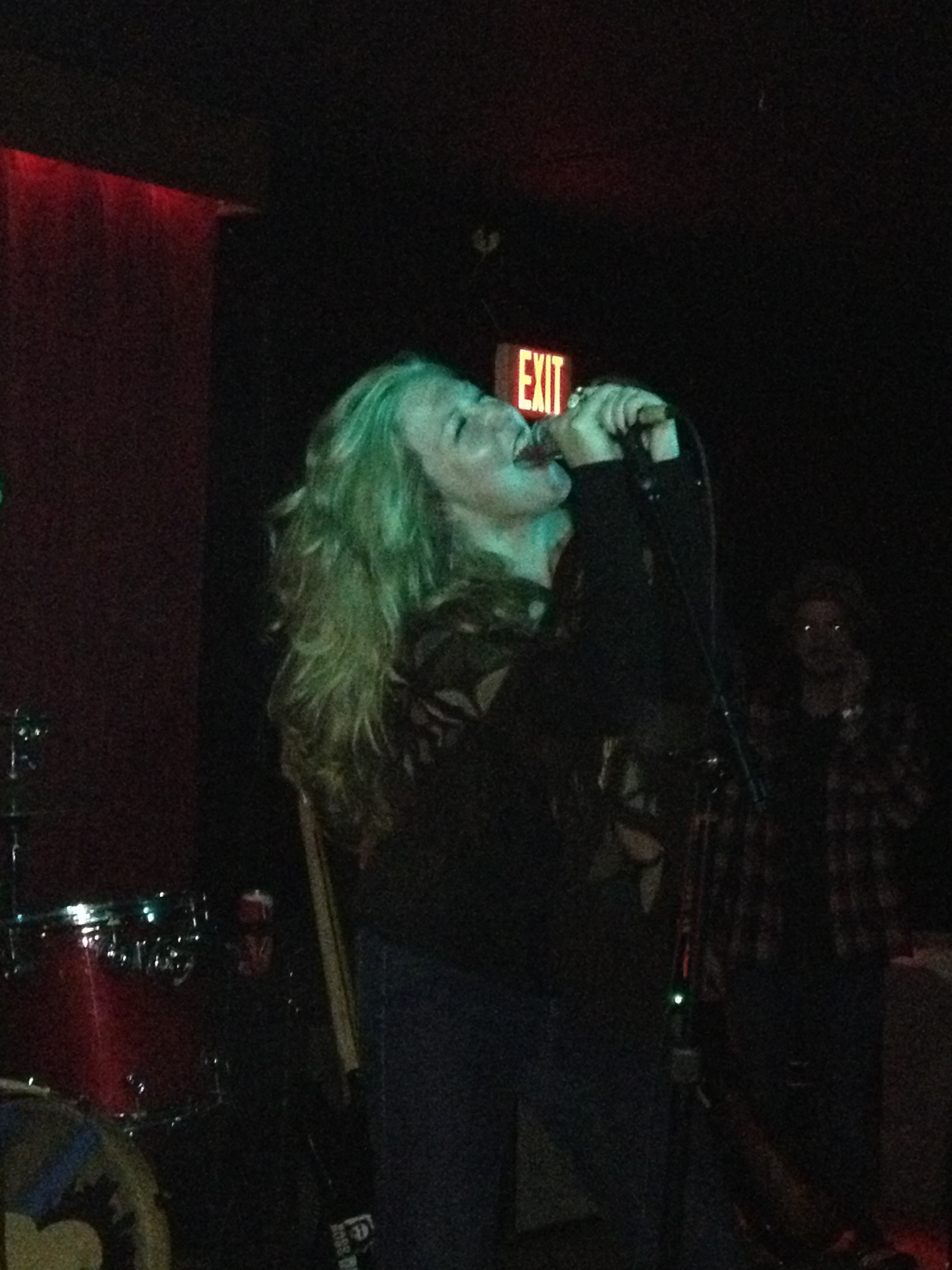
- Vollmer performing on stage in Austin, Texas on April 7, 2013
- Born: July 22, 1973 (age 53); Mineola, New York, U.S.
- Occupations: Film producer, make-up artist, voice actress
- Years active: 1999–present
- Spouse: Johnny Woodstock (m. 2016)
- Children: 1

Tiffany Michele Vollmer (born July 22, 1973) is an American film producer, make-up artist, and voice actress. She formerly worked for Funimation as the voice of Bulma in the Dragon Ball franchise from 1999 to 2009.

== Biography ==
=== Career ===
As a voice actress, Vollmer was cast as Bulma in 1999 for Funimation's English dub of the third season of Dragon Ball Z, and went on to voice the character in the remainder of the series, as well as the redub of the first two seasons. She also voiced Bulma in Dragon Ball and Dragon Ball GT, as well as ten feature films, a TV special, and fourteen video games. She also voiced a few smaller, additional characters in the Dragon Ball franchise, in addition to minor roles on Yu Yu Hakusho and Case Closed. In 2009, she was replaced by Monica Rial as the voice of Bulma for the franchise, starting with Dragon Ball Z Kai and every piece of Dragon Ball media after it.

Vollmer also worked on a couple of live action films, both in front of and behind the camera. She was the associate producer of the half hour short, Placebo (2006) (co-starring three of her fellow Funimation VAs Laura Bailey, Meredith McCoy, and Mike McFarland). She also worked on the 2008 film Ciao, as actress, key makeup artist, and head of wardrobe. She provided makeup and wardrobe for the 2008 film Stalker's Dating Guide. In 2010, Vollmer was the assistant director and art director for the horror film, Evidence of a Haunting, which was released in Fall 2010.

In 2011, Vollmer relocated to New Orleans, Louisiana to continue her work as a film maker, artist, designer and actress. In 2019, she moved to Dallas after accepting a Department Chair position at MediaTech Institute.

== English dubbing roles ==
=== (as Bulma in Dragon Ball franchise) ===
==== Series ====
- Dragon Ball
- Dragon Ball Z
- Dragon Ball GT

==== Film ====
- Dragon Ball: Mystical Adventure
- Dragon Ball Z: Dead Zone
- Dragon Ball Z: The World's Strongest
- Dragon Ball Z: The Tree of Might
- Dragon Ball Z: Lord Slug
- Dragon Ball Z: Broly - The Legendary Super Saiyan
- Dragon Ball Z: Bojack Unbound
- Dragon Ball Z: Fusion Reborn
- Dragon Ball Z: Wrath of the Dragon
- Dragon Ball: The Path to Power

==== Special ====
- Dragon Ball Z: The History of Trunks

==== Video games ====
- Dragon Ball Z: Budokai
- Dragon Ball Z: Budokai 2
- Dragon Ball Z: Budokai 3
- Dragon Ball Z: Sagas
- Dragon Ball Z: Budokai Tenkaichi
- Dragon Ball Z: Budokai Tenkaichi 2
- Dragon Ball Z: Shin Budokai - Another Road
- Dragon Ball Z: Harukanaru Densetsu
- Dragon Ball Z: Budokai Tenkaichi 3
- Dragon Ball: Origins
- Dragon Ball Z: Infinite World
- Dragon Ball: Revenge of King Piccolo
- Dragon Ball: Raging Blast
- Dragon Ball: Origins 2

=== Other appearances ===
==== Anime ====
- Manager in Yu Yu Hakusho (1 episode)
- Betsy in Case Closed (2 episodes)
- Juliana in Dragon Ball Z: Fusion Reborn (Movie)

== Filmography ==
=== Live action ===
- Placebo (2006) (associate producer only)
- Doctor in Ciao (2008) (also key makeup artist and wardrobe)
- Stalker's Dating Guide (2008) (makeup artist and wardrobe)
- Evidence of a Haunting (2010) (assistant director, art director)

=== Interviews ===
- Invasion Anime (2002)
- Dragon Ball Z: Budokai 3: Behind the Screams (2004)
