= Don Brown (voice actor) =

Canadian voice actor and comedian

- Occupations: Voice actor, comedian
- Years active: 1982–present
- Notable credits: Inuyasha as Jaken; Kurozuka as Kurumazo

Don Brown is a Canadian voice actor and comedian best known as the voice of Jaken in Inuyasha and Kurumazo in Kurozuka.

== Voice roles ==
Title	Role
A Chinese Ghost Story: The Tsui Hark Animation	Red Beard
Adieu Galaxy Express 999	Narrator, C6248
Adventures of Mowgli	Chil
Beast Wars: Transformers	Scorponok
Benjamin the Elephant	Gulliver
Billy the Cat	Additional Voices
Brain Powered	Noah Bridge, Kensaku Isami, Nanga Silverly
Camp Candy	Additional Voices
Captain N: The Game Master	Dragonlord
Deltora Quest	Chett; Competitors (ep 16); Fa-Glin; Filli; Gnomes (ep 28); Gorl; Guard Captain (ep 14); Ichabod; Jod; Kree; Snik
Dragon Ball	Emperor Pilaf (Ocean dub)
Dragon Ball Z	King Kai, Shenron, Mr. Satan, Burter, Kibito (Ocean dub)
Dragon Ball Z: Dead Zone	Garlic Jr., Shenron, Master Roshi (Ocean Group-Funimation dub) (Ocean dub)
Dragon Ball Z: The World's Strongest	Shenron, Master Roshi, Ebifurya (Ocean Group-Funimation dub) (Ocean dub)
Dragon Ball Z: The Tree of Might	King Kai, Shenron, Rasin (Ocean Group-Funimation-Saban dub); King Kai, Shenron, Lakasei, Master Roshi (Ocean Group-Pioneer dub) (Ocean dub)
Dragon Drive	Darks
Fantastic Four: World's Greatest Heroes	Henry Peter Gyrich
Fat Dog Mendoza	Caesar, America's Mostly Criminals Narrator
Future Card Buddyfight series	Armor Knight Eagle; Azi Dahaka; Captain Answer; Demon Wolf, Fenrir; Drum's Father; Electron Ninja, Shiden; Extreme Sword Dragon; Martian UFO, Takosuke; Melerquim; Mighty Frost Giant, Hrimthurs; Mr. Hitotaba Neginoyama; Principal Ikarino; Silver Staff Dragon; Tsukikage; Break Shoulder (ep 14); Gang the King (4 episodes); Ogre (ep 17); Orthus B (ep 3); Srydarm (ep 18); Dimmborgi; Giant Tanuki
G.I. Joe: A Real American Hero	Clean-Sweep, Mutt (Season 2), Sub-Zero, T'Jbang, Slice, Various Cobra Troopers
Galaxy Express 999	Narrator, Antares, C6248
Grey: Digital Target	Komon Rope
Hamtaro	Brandy, Elder Ham
He-Man and the Masters of the Universe	Evilseed
Hikaru no Go	Sensei Kakimoto
Hurricanes	Additional Voices
Inuyasha	Jaken, Yōreitaisei (The Final Act; ep 3), Hitomiko's master (The Final Act; ep 16)
Inuyasha: The Final Act	Jaken, Yōreitaisei (The Final Act; ep 3), Hitomiko's master (The Final Act; ep 16)
Inuyasha the Movie: Affections Touching Across Time	Jaken, Yōreitaisei (The Final Act; ep 3), Hitomiko's master (The Final Act; ep 16)
Inuyasha the Movie: Swords of an Honorable Ruler	Tōga, Jaken
Inuyasha the Movie: Fire on the Mystic Island	Jaken
Jingle Bell Rock	Art
Key the Metal Idol	Prince Snake Eye
Kurozuka	Kurumazo
Let's Go Quintuplets	Principal
Lion of Oz	Pin Cushion
Make Way for Noddy	Gobbo (US Re-Dub)
MegaMan: NT Warrior	SharkMan, RocketMan, VideoMan, and SparkMan
Mix Master	Dr. Joeb, Mino
Mobile Suit Gundam	Captain Paolo, Admiral Gauf, Challia Bull
Mobile Suit Gundam SEED	Siegel Clyne
Mobile Suit Gundam Wing	Dr. J, Marquise Weridge, Miser, Walker, Master Long, Sedichi, Ahmad, General Digonadelle
Monster Rancher	Zilla, Shogun, Henger, Captain Scale Jell, Captain Black Worm, Muddy Jell, Various
Night Warriors: Darkstalkers' Revenge	Bishamon
Ōban Star-Racers	Lord Furter
Pocket Dragon Adventures	Additional Voices
Pretty Cure	Dr. Bomium (ep 12)
Project ARMS	Tillinghast's Bodyguard, Mob Guard
Ranma ½	Farmer Brown, An-Man, Javis
ReBoot	Code Master Lens
RoboCop: Alpha Commando	Additional Voices
Rudolph the Red-Nosed Reindeer and the Island of Misfit Toys	Toy Taker
Saber Marionette J	Shogun Ieyasu Tokugawa, Doctor Hess
Sabrina's Secret Life	Additional Voices
Sanctuary	Norimoto Isaoka
Santa's Little Ferrets	Santa
Spiff and Hercules	Hercules
Starship Operators	Gent Wakana
Stories From My Childhood	Various Characters
Stone Protectors	
Super Trolls	
The Christmas Orange	Wiley Studpustle
The Little Prince (2010)	Philatello (The Planet of Carapodes)
The Mighty Kong	Additional Voices
The New Adventures of He-Man	Hydron, Gepple, Optikk, Quakke, Kayo, Vizar, Werban
The New Adventures of Kimba The White Lion	Caesar/Panja, Coco
The New Adventures of Peter Pan	Mr. Smee
The Story of Saiunkoku	Secretary Sai
The Vision of Escaflowne	Balgus (Ocean/Bandai dub)
Tom and Jerry Tales	Tom, Droopy (season 1 only)
Transformers: Armada	Cyclonus
Transformers: Energon	Cyclonus/Snow Cat, Constructicon Maximus
Troll Tales	
Trouble Chocolate	Master
Ultimate Book of Spells	Additional Voices
Viper's Creed	Chief Supervisor Walter
Zoids: New Century Zero	Altail, Benjamin
