= Dragon Ball Z: Fusion Reborn =

- Theatrical release poster
- Directed by: Shigeyasu Yamauchi
- Screenplay by: Takao Koyama
- Based on: Dragon Ball by Akira Toriyama
- Starring: See below
- Cinematography: Toshiharu Takei
- Edited by: Shinichi Fukumitsu
- Music by: Shunsuke Kikuchi
- Production company: Toei Animation
- Distributed by: Toei Company
- Release date: March 4, 1995
- Running time: 52 minutes
- Country: Japan
- Language: Japanese
- Box office: ¥2.16 billion (Japan) $23.5 million (worldwide)

Dragon Ball Z: Fusion Reborn, known in Japan as Dragon Ball Z: Fukkatsu no Fusion!! Gokū to Bejīta (Japanese: ドラゴンボールZ 復活のフュージョン!!悟空とベジータ; lit. 'Dragon Ball Z: The Rebirth of Fusion!! Goku and Vegeta'), is a 1995 Japanese animated fantasy martial arts film and the 12th film in the Dragon Ball Z series. It was originally released in Japan on March 4 at Toei Anime Fair, and dubbed into English by Funimation in 2006. It was preceded by Dragon Ball Z: Bio-Broly and followed by Dragon Ball Z: Wrath of the Dragon.

== Plot ==
In the other world, a teenage oni is manning a cleansing machine and the loud volume of his walkman distracts him, causing the machine to explode. The oni is engulfed by the freed evil spirit essence and transforms into Janemba, a massive childlike monster with dimensional manipulation abilities. As a result, the deceased are resurrected.

Goku and Pikkon are fighting in a tournament when they are interrupted by the appearance of a strange crystal-like substance and are sent to investigate the disturbance by the Grand Kai. They find the afterlife's "check-in station" to be encased in the crystal-like barrier which is also immune to their energy blasts. From inside of the station, its trapped attendant King Yemma directs them to the monster, Janemba, who refuses to drop the barrier. Goku lures Janemba to hell while Pikkon works to free Yemma.

Meanwhile, Earth comes under siege by an array of zombies, soldiers and past villains led by Frieza, who attack a city until Gohan and Videl intervene, with the former destroying him causing the villains to flee in terror. The two along with Bulma, Goten and Trunks gather the magical Dragon Balls and summon the dragon Shenron to ask him to rebuild the barrier between the living and dead, but he is unable to do so since only Yemma can control the boundaries of the afterlife. Forcing them to continue the fight against those who escaped hell. Goten and Trunks faced a Dictator with alongside his army, he appeared to be a parody of Adolf Hitler truly showing the horrors being released. In hell, Janemba uses his unorthodox powers to best Goku until he powers up to Super Saiyan 3, shaking Other World while he does it, and seemingly kills Janemba. He merely transforms into a much smaller, albeit far more powerful and sinister form - Super Janemba. Goku is overwhelmed by Super Janemba but Vegeta has regained his physical body and arrives in time to help. However, the two Saiyans are still no match for Super Janemba and are forced to hide. Goku proposes using the Fusion Dance technique, but Vegeta pridefully refuses to join bodies with Goku.

Pikkon continues to try and free Yemma to no avail, and in his anger, insults the crystal substance which causes it to slightly crack. However, Pikkon's worst insults do not cause enough damage to rescue Yemma so he decides to aid Goku and Vegeta in their fight. After much persuasion, Vegeta agrees to fuse with Goku but Vegeta fails to extend his forefinger when required and the fusion fails, resulting in a weak, obese form named Veku. Super Janemba beats Veku severely and almost kills him, but the fusion wears off and Goku and Vegeta escape in time. Pikkon arrives to stall Super Janemba while Goku and Vegeta attempt the fusion again, this time successfully transforming into the immensely powerful Super Gogeta, who swiftly gains the advantage over Janemba and he uses his power to defeat the demon, causing him to revert into his oni form, who flees.

With Super Janemba vanquished, his hold over reality disappears and the deceased return to the afterlife. After sharing a good-natured farewell with Goku, Vegeta reverts to his spirit form and disappears. Back on Earth, Gohan, Videl, Goten, and Trunks depart back home. In a post-credits scene, a still-summoned Shenron awaits another wish.

== Cast ==
Character (Note: In the closing credits, the English cast were listed with the character's English names (e.g. Goku, Master Roshi, Krillin), while the Japanese cast were listed with Japanese names (e.g. Son Goku, Turtle Hermit, Kuririn).)	Japanese	English
Character	Japanese	Funimation (2006)
Goku	Masako Nozawa	Sean Schemmel
Gohan	Masako Nozawa	Kyle Hebert
Goten	Masako Nozawa	Kara Edwards
Vegeta	Ryō Horikawa	Christopher R. Sabat
Trunks	Takeshi Kusao	Laura Bailey
Videl	Yūko Minaguchi	Kara Edwards
Paikūhan	Hikaru Midorikawa	Pikkon
Paikūhan	Hikaru Midorikawa	Kyle Hebert
Gogeta	Masako Nozawa; Ryō Horikawa	Sean Schemmel; Christopher R. Sabat
Gotenks	Masako Nozawa; Takeshi Kusao	Kara Edwards; Laura Bailey
Veku (ベクウ, Bekuu)	Masako Nozawa; Ryō Horikawa	Sean Schemmel; Christopher R. Sabat
Bulma	Hiromi Tsuru	Tiffany Vollmer
Chi-Chi	Naoko Watanabe	Cynthia Cranz
Frieza	Ryūsei Nakao	Linda Young
Shenron	Tesshō Genda	Christopher R. Sabat
Mr. Satan	Daisuke Gōri	Hercule (edited version)
Mr. Satan	Daisuke Gōri	Chris Rager
Lord Enma (閻魔大王, Enma Daiō)	Daisuke Gōri	King Yemma
Lord Enma (閻魔大王, Enma Daiō)	Daisuke Gōri	Chris Rager
Kaiō	Jōji Yanami	King Kai
Kaiō	Jōji Yanami	Sean Schemmel
South Kai	Toku Nishio	Dameon Clarke
West Kai	Bin Shimada	Kyle Hebert
East Kai	Keiko Yamamoto	Stephanie Nadolny
Grand Kai	Ryuji Saikachi	Evan Jones
Psyche Demon (サイケ鬼, Saike Oni)	Tesshō Genda	Young Rocker
Psyche Demon (サイケ鬼, Saike Oni)	Tesshō Genda	Jim Foronda
Janemba (ジャネンバ, Janenba)	Tesshō Genda	Jim Foronda (Janempa); Kent Williams (Super Janemba)
The Dictator (独裁者, Dokusaisha)	Bin Shimada	Christopher Bevins
Other World Tournament Announcer	Ryūsei Nakao	Christopher R. Sabat
Jeice	—N/a	Christopher R. Sabat
Arqua (アークア, Ākua)	—N/a	Dameon Clarke
Furōgu (フーログ)	—N/a	Frogue
Furōgu (フーログ)	—N/a	Justin Cook
Vampire	Unknown	Count Drac
Vampire	Unknown	Eric Vale
Narrator	Jōji Yanami	Kyle Hebert

== Music ==
The song "We Gotta Power" was used as the film's opening theme.

=== Saikyō no Fusion ===
"Saikyō no Fusion"

Single by Hironobu Kageyama
- Released: March 1, 1995
- Genre: Anison
- Length: 8:46
- Label: Sony Music
- Songwriter: Yukinojo Mori

"Saikyō no Fusion" (最強のフュージョン, Saikyō no Fyūjon; The Strongest Fusion) is the closing theme song of the film and is a single by Japanese singer Hironobu Kageyama. It was released on 8 cm CD on March 1, 1995, in Japan only. It is coupled with the character song "Ai wa Barādo no Yō ni ~Vegeta no Tēma~" performed by Shin Oya. The single charted 95 on Oricon.

==== Track list ====
1. 最強のフュージョン
  Saikyō no Fyūjon/The Strongest Fusion
2. 愛はバラードのように～ベジータのテーマ～
  Ai wa Barādo no Yō ni~Bejīta no Tēma~/Love is Like a Ballad: Theme of Vegeta

=== English dub soundtrack ===
The score for the English dub's composed by Nathan Johnson and Dave Moran. The Double Feature release contains an alternate audio track containing the English dub with original Japanese background music by Shunsuke Kikuchi and an ending theme of "Saikyō no Fusion".

== Box office ==
At the Japanese box office, the film sold 3.2 million tickets and grossed ¥2.16 billion ($23 million).

On November 3 and 5, 2018, it had a joint limited theatrical release with the TV special Dragon Ball Z: Bardock – The Father of Goku (1990), titled as Dragon Ball Z: Saiyan Double Feature, by Fathom Events in the United States due to the upcoming release of Dragon Ball Super: Broly (2018). According to Box Office Mojo, as of November 7, 2018, the Saiyan Double Feature made a revenue of $540,707.

This adds up to a total gross of $23,540,707 in Japan and the United States.

== Releases ==
Dragon Ball Z: Fusion Reborn was theatrically released in Japan on March 4, 1995. The film was released on VHS and LaserDisc in September 1995. It was first released on DVD on April 14, 2006, as part of Dragon Box The Movies, a box set that includes every Dragon Ball film released up to that point. Fusion Reborn was later released on its own on January 9, 2009, as Dragon Ball The Movies #12. Fusion Reborn was released on Blu-ray on December 5, 2018, as part of Dragon Ball The Movies Blu-ray #06, a two-film set that also includes Dragon Ball Z: Bio-Broly. The jacket of the Blu-ray originally featured a disclaimer that the films contain content that "may be considered inappropriate for modern audiences" but were included as originally made out of respect for their "historical value". However, the versions of the films included were actually censored; namely, the removal of characters giving the middle finger. Toei apologized for the mistake, offered refunds, and stated that all copies shipped after January 25, 2019, would be censored, but would contain an accurate jacket that notes the films have been altered.

Funimation released the film on DVD in North America on March 28, 2006. They later released it in the final Double Feature set along with Wrath of the Dragon (1995) for Blu-ray and DVD on May 19, 2009. Both feature full 1080p format in HD remastered 16:9 aspect ratio and an enhanced 5.1 surround mix. The film was re-released to DVD by Funimation in the final remastered thinpak collection on January 3, 2012, containing the last four Dragon Ball Z films.

A second English dub produced and released exclusively in Malaysia by Speedy Video features an unknown voice cast. The Speedy dub is notoriously known among fans for its poor grammar and voice acting, low-quality audio mixing, and limited pool of voice actors, as well as heavily compressed low-resolution video quality due to it being released on Video CD.
