= Dragon Ball: Advanced Adventure =

2004 video game

- Developer: Dimps
- Publishers: JP: Banpresto; EU: Bandai; NA: Atari
- Series: Dragon Ball
- Platform: Game Boy Advance
- Release: JP: November 18, 2004; EU: June 17, 2005; NA: June 6, 2006
- Genre: Beat 'em up
- Modes: Single-player, multiplayer

Dragon Ball: Advanced Adventure (Note: Japanese: ドラゴンボール アドバンス アドベンチャー, Hepburn: Doragon Bōru Adobansu Adobenchā) is a 2004 video game developed by Dimps and published by Atari for the Game Boy Advance. It is based on the Dragon Ball franchise.

== Gameplay ==
=== Story mode ===
The game follows the story of the original manga series, chronicling a young Goku's adventures across every story arc leading up to the battle against King Piccolo.

In this 2D side-scrolling beat 'em up, special items can be collected throughout each stage, include those that increase the player's health and/or ki, "Dragon Balls". Clearing the mode unlocks the ability to play as Krillin. The mode is divided in various stage types; including standard platforming levels with enemies, flying stages, and one-on-one battles.

=== One-on-one mode ===
This fighting mode has a similar concept to X-Men: Children of the Atom, allowing players to choose from and fight against a roster of 30 playable characters, as well as decide the area you and your opponent will fight at, and how long the fight will be. Defeating a character in a fight during Story Mode unlocks them in One-on-One mode.

Apart from single battles, a Survival Mode can also be unlocked by completing both Goku and Krillin's Story Mode. In a Survival mode game you are placed in a tournament, and can select any of the characters that have been unlocked. The multiplayer mode allows 2 players to compete against each other with most of the options available in One-on-One Mode.

=== Extra mode ===
After the player has completed Goku's Story Mode it unlocks Extra Mode. In Extra Mode, the player revisits any of the levels in Story Mode. All of the red doors seen throughout the levels can now be opened, and a greater amount of items are placed in the stages. Minigames can be unlocked by finding all 54 items. The Extra Mode Character List shows 28 characters that the player can unlock for use in Extra Mode, aside from Goku and Krillin. Each of them has a corresponding portrait hidden in one of the levels that must be found to unlock the character for use. Both the third and fourth mini game must be accessed before every single character can be unlocked. After that, it is highly recommended to play through Extra Mode as each character and learn all of their moves. Such characters include Tien Shinhan, Yamcha, Chiaotzu, General Blue, and other miscellaneous enemies.

== Reception ==
Reception

Aggregate score
Aggregator	Score
Metacritic	75/100

Review scores
Publication	Score
Famitsu	29/40
GameSpot	7.5/10
GameSpy	4/5
IGN	7.5/10
Nintendo Power	7/10

The game received "generally favorable reviews" according to the review aggregation website Metacritic. In Japan, Famitsu gave it a score of three sevens and one eight, for a total of 29 out of 40.

== See also ==
- Dragon Ball: Revenge of King Piccolo
