= Dragon Ball Z: Wrath of the Dragon =

- Theatrical release poster
- Directed by: Mitsuo Hashimoto
- Written by: Takao Koyama
- Based on: Dragon Ball by Akira Toriyama
- Starring: See below
- Narrated by: Jōji Yanami
- Cinematography: Masao Shimizu
- Edited by: Shinichi Fukumitsu
- Music by: Shunsuke Kikuchi
- Production company: Toei Animation
- Distributed by: Toei Company
- Release date: July 15, 1995 (Japan)
- Running time: 52 minutes
- Country: Japan
- Language: Japanese
- Box office: ¥1.7 billion

Dragon Ball Z: Wrath of the Dragon, known in Japan as Dragon Ball Z: Ryū-Ken Bakuhatsu!! Gokū ga Yaraneba Dare ga Yaru? (Japanese: ドラゴンボールZ 龍拳爆発!!悟空がやらねば誰がやる？; lit. 'Dragon Ball Z: Dragon Fist Explosion!! If Goku Won't Do It, Who Will?'), (Note: Also known by Toei's own English title Dragon Ball Z: Explosion of Dragon Punch, and by the subtitle Explosion of Dragon Punch in Malaysia.) is a 1995 Japanese animated science fantasy martial arts film and the thirteenth Dragon Ball Z feature film. It was released in Japan on July 15 at the Toei Anime Fair. It was preceded by Dragon Ball Z: Fusion Reborn and followed by Dragon Ball Z: Battle of Gods.

Set after the defeat of Kid Buu, the film focuses on the efforts of an evil magician, Hoi, to release the deadly monster Hirudegarn onto the Earth, forcing Goku and his friends to enlist the aid of a warrior named Tapion, who may be the only one capable of defeating the evil monster. Series creator Akira Toriyama designed the Tapion and Minotia characters.

== Plot ==
On an unknown world, a young humanoid is crushed to death by a gigantic monster which then vanishes as an unseen entity laughs and announces that it is headed for Earth.

On Earth, Gohan and Videl, acting as their superhero personas Great Saiyaman and Great Saiyaman 2, stop an elderly man from committing suicide. The man introduces himself as Hoi and presents them with an enchanted music box, claiming that a hero named Tapion is trapped inside and is their only chance to stop an approaching evil. With all other methods of potentially opening the box exhausted, the magical Dragon Balls are assembled and a wish to the eternal dragon Shenron is used to open it. Tapion is released but expresses anger at having been freed, explaining that inside of him is half of the ferocious monster called Hirudegarn that only the box was keeping at bay.

Tapion flees into isolation but is visited by Trunks who takes a liking to him. The lower half of Hirudegarn soon appears and begins attacking the city. Gohan and Videl attempt to fight it with Gohan learning that Hirudegarn is intangible except when it attacks. The fight ensues until Tapion plays a tune on his ocarina which weakens Hirudegarn and causes it to vanish. Hoi claims that Tapion is the true threat and that the ocarina must be destroyed, so he attempts to steal the instrument and in the ensuing scuffle, Trunks takes possession of it and chooses to side with Tapion. Hoi flees and Tapion accepts Trunks as a friend. Tapion relays his story to Bulma and explains that one-thousand years prior an evil race of alien sorcerers set out to destroy all life in the universe by awakening Hirudegarn. Their conquest eventually brought them to Tapion's planet where during the battle, a priest created an enchanted sword and two ocarinas capable of stopping Hirudegarn.

Tapion and his younger brother Minotia kept the monster at bay with the ocarinas while the priest cleaved it in half with the sword. In the aftermath, a war council decided to have Hirudegarn's two halves sealed inside of Tapion and Minotia and have them locked inside enchanted music boxes to be sent to opposite ends of the universe. Hoi, one of the surviving sorcerers, found and killed Minotia and now seeks Tapion's in order to complete Hirudegarn's revival. Bulma builds Tapion a specialized bedroom so that he can sleep without the monster escaping. However, this fails. The monster's lower half reappears and in desperation, Tapion begs for death in order to destroy Hirudegarn's upper half, but the beast manages to escape. Its revival complete, Hirudegarn lays waste to the city and is confronted by Super Saiyan Goku, Ultimate Gohan, and Super Saiyan Goten who are no match for the monster.

Vegeta arrives to join the fight in Super Saiyan form but is quickly defeated as well while Super Saiyan Trunks and Goten fuse into Super Saiyan 3 Gotenks and bombard Hirudegarn with energy blasts. Hirudegarn then transforms into a more powerful form and defeats Gotenks effortlessly. Tapion attempts to seal Hirudegarn inside of himself again by playing the ocarina and asks Trunks to kill him with the sword once he does. Trunks hesitates and Hirudegarn escapes yet again, destroying the ocarina in the process. As Hoi gloats over his apparent victory, he is crushed to death by the monster. A rampage Goku transforms to Super Saiyan 3 and prepares for one final battle with Hirudegarn. Trunks intervenes and cuts the monster's tail off with the sword and Goku figures out that the monster is only vulnerable after attacking and he takes a beating while antagonizing Hirudegarn. An enraged Hirudegarn is weakened allowing Goku uses his Dragon Fist attack to finally kill it.

Tapion uses Bulma's time machine to return to his planet before it was destroyed. Before departing, Tapion presents Trunks with his sword as a farewell gift. In the ending credits, Future Trunks is shown slaying Frieza with a similar sword.

== Cast ==
Character name	Voice actor	
Character name	Japanese	English
Character name	Japanese	Funimation (2006)
Goku	Masako Nozawa	Sean Schemmel
Gohan	Masako Nozawa	Kyle Hebert
Goten	Masako Nozawa	Kara Edwards
Tapion (タピオン, Tapion)	Hiro Yūki	Jason Liebrecht
Vegeta	Ryō Horikawa	Christopher Sabat
Trunks	Takeshi Kusao	Laura Bailey
Gotenks	Masako Nozawa; Takeshi Kusao	Kara Edwards; Laura Bailey
Bulma	Hiromi Tsuru	Tiffany Vollmer
Kuririn	Mayumi Tanaka	Krillin
Kuririn	Mayumi Tanaka	Sonny Strait
Videl	Yūko Minaguchi	Kara Edwards
Kame-Sennin	Masaharu Satō	Master Roshi
Kame-Sennin	Masaharu Satō	Mike McFarland
Shenlong	Masaharu Satō	Shenron
Shenlong	Masaharu Satō	Christopher Sabat
Minotia (ミノシア, Minoshia)	Mayumi Tanaka	Aaron Dismuke
Hirudegarn (ヒルデガーン, Hirudegān)	Shin Aomori	Robert McCollum
Hoi (ホイ)	Shigeharu Matsuda	Troy Baker
Oolong	Naoki Tatsuta	Brad Jackson
Teacher	Makiko Ohmoto	Miss Hamilton
Teacher	Makiko Ohmoto	Stephanie Nadolny
Robbers	Nobuhiko Kazama	Ian Sinclair; Markus Lloyd; Jim Johnson
Onlookers	Ichirō Nagata	Jeff Johnson; David Trosko; Kevin M. Connolly
Pilot	Yasuhiko Kawazu	Daniel Katsuk
Radio Voice	Yoshiyuki Kono	Andy Mullins
Sharpner (シャプナー, Shapunā)	Hiro Yūki	Duncan Brannan
Narrator	Jōji Yanami	Kyle Hebert

== Music ==
- IN (Insert Song):
  - "Yūsha no Fue ~Tapion no Tēma~" (勇者の笛～タピオンのテーマ～; lit. 'Whistle of the Brave ~Tapion's Theme~')
    - Lyrics by Yukinojō Mori
    - Music by Tetsuji Hayashi
    - Arranged by Osamu Totsuka
    - Performed by Susumu Ōya
- ED (Ending Theme):
  - "Ore ga Yaranakya Dare ga Yaru" (俺がやらなきゃ誰がやる)
    - Lyrics by Yukinojō Mori
    - Music by Tetsuji Hayashi
    - Arranged by Yūzō Hayashi
    - Performed by Hironobu Kageyama

The score for the Funimation English dub is composed by Nathan Johnson.

== Box office ==
At the Japanese box office, the film sold 2.4 million tickets and earned a net distribution rental income of ¥1 billion,.

In the United States, the DVD release has grossed $4,770,466 in sales, as of 2014.

== Releases ==
In Japan, several editions of the film were released on both Blu-ray and DVD. The first DVD was manufactured by Toei Video and released on April 14, 2006, under the title DRAGON BOX THE MOVIES, a limited edition containing all 17 theatrical films of Dragon Ball, it also contains a deluxe box, a special brochure, a postcard-sized film poster sticker, and two personal transceivers that you can use to talk to your friends or coordinate your attacks. On February 13, 2009, Toei Video released the individual DVD of the film with some special features and bonus tracks. The Blu-ray Dragon Ball: The Movies #07 was released on January 9, 2019, and includes 2 episodes, Dragon Ball Z: Wrath of the Dragon and Dragon Ball: The Path to Power. It comes with an 8-page booklet and HD remastered scanned from negative.

It was released on DVD in North America on September 12, 2006, It was later released in final double feature set along with Fusion Reborn (1995) for Blu-ray and DVD on May 19, 2009, both feature full 1080p format in HD remastered 16:9 aspect ratio and an enhanced 5.1 surround mix. The film was re-released to DVD in final remastered thinpak collection on January 3, 2012, containing the last 4 Dragon Ball Z films.

A second English dub produced and released in Malaysia by Speedy Video features an unknown voice cast.
