= Master Roshi =

Fictional character from Dragon Ball

- Dragon Ball character
- Master Roshi's first appearance in the manga, drawn by Akira Toriyama
- First appearance: Dragon Ball chapter 3: Goku – Running to the Sea, 17 July 1984 (Weekly Shōnen Jump 1984)
- Created by: Akira Toriyama
- Voiced by: Japanese: Kōhei Miyauchi (Dragon Ball – Dragon Ball Z episode 260); Jōji Yanami (Dragon Ball episode 137); Hiroshi Masuoka (Dragon Ball Z episode 288 – Dragon Ball GT, 2008 special); Kinya Aikawa (The Path to Power); Takkō Ishimori (as Jackie Chun in Advanced Adventure); Masaharu Satō (Wrath of the Dragon, 2009-present); Nobuaki Kanemitsu (Mini; Dragon Ball Daima); English: Clifton Wells (Harmony Gold dub); Michael Donovan, Ian James Corlett, Peter Kelamis, Don Brown, and Terry Klassen (Ocean Group dubs); Dean Galloway (Blue Water dub); Mike McFarland (Funimation dubs); Ed Marcus (AB Groupe dub); Nesty Calvo Ramirez (Creative Products Corp. dub); Dave Bridges (Animax dub); Kirk Thornton (Bang Zoom! dub)
- Portrayed by: Chow Yun-fat (Dragonball Evolution)

In-universe information
- Alias: Jackie Chun
- Title: The Turtle Hermit (sobriquet)
- Occupation: Martial arts teacher (retired)
- Relatives: Fortune-teller Baba (older sister)
- Master: Mutaito; Korin
- Apprentices: Grandpa Gohan; Ox-King; Goku; Krillin; Yamcha

Master Roshi, known in Japan as Kame Sennin (亀仙人; lit. 'Turtle Sage') as well as Muten Rōshi (武天老師; lit. 'Old Heavenly Master of Martial Arts'), is a fictional character in the Japanese manga series Dragon Ball and its anime adaptations created by Akira Toriyama. The name Roshi is a modernized Japanese translation of the antiquated form of Old Master (Chinese: 老子), namely the ancient Daoist Sage.

Within the series, he is an elderly martial arts master, born on March 20, who is the creator of the Kamehameha (カメハメ波) technique. His students include Grandpa Son Gohan, The Ox-King, Son Goku, Krillin and Yamcha. He is bald, sports a thick van dyke beard, and wears sunglasses, beach clothes, or martial arts suits. He usually wields a walking stick and, in early appearances, wears a turtle's shell on his back. Despite his lechery, cantankerousness, and occasional whimsy or foolishness, he is often depicted as wise and perceptive. While a popular character with Dragon Ball fans, his lecherous antics have been met with significant criticism and controversy.

== Voice actors ==
Master Roshi's design was inspired by the character of Kami-sama from Toriyama's previous manga Dr. Slump^{[vol. 2:afterword]} and accordingly was originally voiced by Kōhei Miyauchi, who also voiced Kami-sama in the original Dr. Slump anime. For unknown reasons, Miyauchi was unavailable for the recording of Dragon Ball Episode #137; the role was played by series narrator Jōji Yanami. Miyauchi's final acting session before he died was for episode 260 of Dragon Ball Z, which he recorded only 3 months before his death. Kame-Sennin is voiced by Hiroshi Masuoka from episode 288 of Dragon Ball Z onward, in Dragon Ball GT and the 2008 Jump Super Anime Tour film. He is voiced by Kinya Aikawa in the 10th anniversary movie, by Takko Ishimori in gameplay of Dragon Ball: Advanced Adventure, by Masaharu Satō in the thirteenth Dragon Ball Z movie and all media following Dragon Ball Kai., and by Nobuaki Kanemitsu in Dragon Ball Daima.

In the Ocean dub, he is voiced by Michael Donovan, Ian James Corlett, Peter Kelamis, Don Brown, and Terry Klassen at various points. Dean Galloway voices him in the Blue Water dub, while Mike McFarland voiced him in the Funimation dub. Other English dub voice actors include Ed Marcus, Nesty Ramirez, Dave Bridges, and Kirk Thornton.

== Appearances ==
=== Dragon Ball ===
Logo of Master Roshi's Turtle school

Master Roshi's first appearance is in chapter #3 of the Dragon Ball manga. Roshi lives with his longtime companion, an anthropomorphic turtle referred to as Umigame (ウミガメ, "Sea Turtle"), on an island with a house built on it known as "Kame House". Kame House eventually serves as a gathering place for Goku and his associates throughout the series, as well as a home for certain recurring characters like Oolong or Krillin and his young family. Graduates of Roshi's training (i.e. Goku, Krillin, Yamcha) often wear the kanji for "Turtle" ("Kame") 亀 on their dogi. When wishing to fight anonymously at the World Martial Arts Tournament, Roshi assumes a disguise and calls himself "Jackie Chun".

Master Roshi is consistently depicted as a pervert who frequently flirts with or harasses physically attractive female characters. In Chapter 5 of the Dragon Ball manga series, published in Weekly Shōnen Jump on January 15, 1985, Roshi makes sexual advances on "Bulma" who is wearing a suggestive bunny costume; it is in fact an impersonation by a shapeshifting Oolong, who seduces Roshi by inviting him to place his face between his "breasts" and calls the act "Puff Puff". The term is derived from the Japanese onomatopoeia for a woman rubbing her breasts in another person's face, though it can also be used to refer to a woman juggling her own breasts.

When tasked with putting out a fire on Mount Frypan, Master Roshi demonstrated an ability to increase his energy greatly. In this state, his appearance changes dramatically, with an enormous increase in muscle mass and height, which is nearly equal to Piccolo's. Due to his natural precision in battle, this bulky state does not appear to affect his speed and agility. In this state, he can perform many ki attacks at their maximum potential, most noticeably an enhanced version of his Kamehameha attack, which was so powerful that it was able to destroy the moon.

At the beginning of the Dragon Ball series, he is considered to be the strongest mortal fighter in the Dragon Ball universe; however, his power level began to pale in comparison to Goku and his allies later in the series. While his legacy is demonstrated in the prolific use of the Kamehameha technique by numerous characters in the series, his prominence has diminished significantly by the time Goku reaches adulthood. He would only make occasional appearances as a supporting character and no longer operate as an active fighter.

=== Dragon Ball Super ===
Master Roshi would return to prominence as a major character with the revival of the Dragon Ball series in the 2010s. In the film Dragon Ball Z: Resurrection 'F' and its counterpart story arc in Dragon Ball Super, Master Roshi would join Goku and his friends in their fight against a resurrected Frieza leading his army to Earth and exact vengeance against Goku. It is also implied in one episode that the Paradise Herb is the source of Master Roshi's long lifespan, as he claims that eating some of it would allow him to live on for another millennium.

In the Universe Survival arc of the Dragon Ball Super manga, Roshi is revealed to have been secretly training and holding back his true strength, and he is later recruited as one of the representatives of the Seventh Universe by Goku, not for his strength, but for his knowledge in fighting in tournaments. But as his perverted behavior got him caught in a mind control spell by a Crane School student named Yurin, Roshi enlists Puar to build up a resistance to beautiful women. Master Roshi manages to eliminate competitors from other universes during the tournament and is one of the last 6 remaining members of Universe 7 in the tournament. Roshi later instructs Goku as he struggles fighting against Jiren, telling him that plain old fighting strength is not a way to measure things, that they master the martial arts not to win fights but to conquer their own selves. Jiren begins to attack Roshi, but the old master can avoid all attacks as he focuses on controlling his body. Ultimately, Jiren can eliminate Roshi after chopping at his neck, but his sacrifice is not in vain as Goku uses Roshi's teaching to unlock the new form, "Ultra Instinct", as Roshi watches from the sidelines.

In the anime, he is forced to eliminate himself when an altercation with the Sixth Universe warrior Frost nearly kills him from excessive use of the Mafuba technique.

=== In other media ===
In June 1988, Master Roshi, along with other Dragon Ball characters, were featured in two public safety announcement shorts. The first was entitled The Goku Traffic Safety (悟空の交通安全, Gokū no Kōtsū Anzen), and the second called The Goku Fire Fighting Regiment (悟空の消防隊, Gokū no Shōbō-tai) where he along with Krillin, Yamcha, and later Goku become volunteer fire fighters.

Master Roshi is portrayed by Chow Yun-fat in the American live-action film Dragonball Evolution; his voice was dubbed over by Tsutomu Isobe in the Japanese version.

Roshi was included as one of eight character pairings in Dragon Ball x One Piece: Cross Epoch, a crossover manga between their respective Dragon Ball and One Piece series. In the 2013 crossover TV special Dream 9 Toriko & One Piece & Dragon Ball Z Super Collaboration Special!! (ドリーム9 トリコ&ワンピース&ドラゴンボールZ 超コラボスペシャル!), Roshi is one of the participants in the Food Tournament (Tenkaichi Kuōkai), consisting of a race to the center of the hosting island and the championship prize of luxuriously rare Carat Sizzled Cattle, hosted by the International Gourmet Organization (IGO).

Roshi is a playable character in the following video games:

- Dragon Ball Z: Ultimate Battle 22
- Dragon Ball Z: Budokai Tenkaichi
- Dragon Ball Z: Budokai Tenkaichi 2 (Playable w/Jackie Chun as an alternate outfit, has MAX Power Mode as transformation)
- Dragon Ball Z: Budokai Tenkaichi 3 (same as above.)
- Dragon Ball: Advanced Adventure (Playable as Jackie Chun)
- Dragon Ball FighterZ (DLC)

== Reception and controversy ==
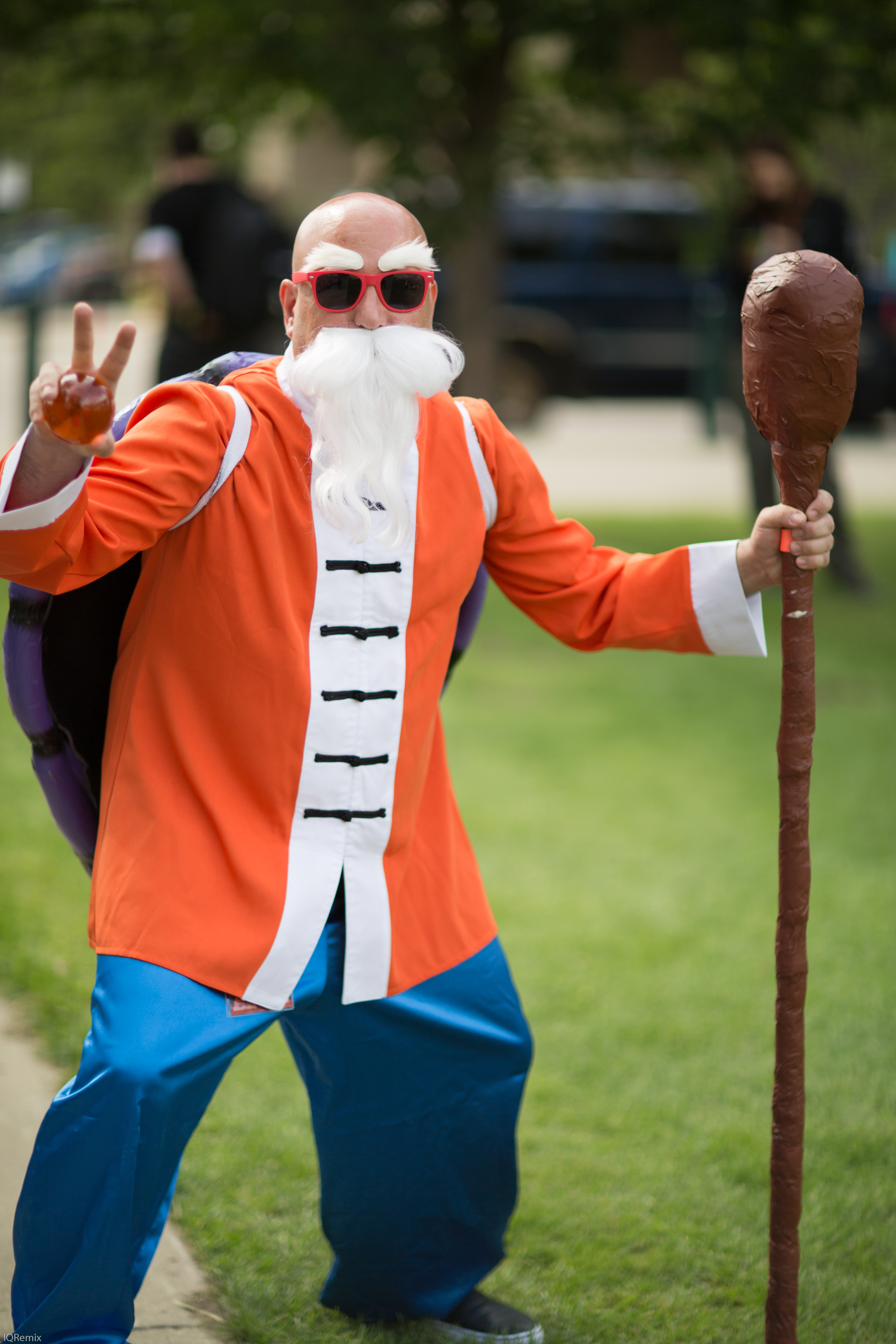
Cosplay of Master Roshi in full uniform

Master Roshi is a popular and widely recognized character, who has appeared in several "top" character lists by fans and critics. Japanese fans voted Master Roshi the thirteenth most popular character of the series in a 2004 poll. Master Roshi was ranked in second place in a Japanese fan poll conducted by Charapedia for their favorite lecherous male anime and manga characters. Master Roshi was ranked among IGN's Top 13 Dragon Ball Z Characters List published in 2015, which acknowledged Roshi's primary role within the series as a comic relief character but also emphasized the importance of the character's in-universe legacy for being the inventor of the Kamehameha, "the franchise's most recognizable move and Goku's signature technique", and that he can still hold his own in battle when necessary. Roshi came in 12th place on Complex's list "A Ranking of All the Characters on 'Dragon Ball Z": Pearce observed that while Master Roshi's role in the series deteriorated with the arrival of the Saiyan characters, he still pops up to offer advice, support, and comic relief.

Master Roshi has received particular attention for his lewd sensibilities as well as his constant attempts to catch the series' female characters in revealing positions. Tim Jones from Them Anime Reviews believed that while fan service is prevalent in the original Dragon Ball series, he opined that it is not very extremely offensive as characters like Roshi quite often gets beaten up or punished in retaliation for comedic effect. Master Roshi's scene with Oolong who is disguised as Bulma originated the slang term "puff puff", which is later referenced in other works which has Toriyama's involvement, such as the Dragon Quest franchise. References to the act were removed from the American television broadcast of the Dragon Ball anime adaptation. The character's lecherous behaviour towards a female character named Yurin in a Dragon Ball Super episode provoked a major complaint by Japan's Broadcasting Ethics and Program Improvement Organization due to the underlying theme of sexual harassment. Another Dragon Ball Super scene, where Roshi persuades Pu'ar to shapeshift into a scantily clad young woman in order to motivate him to train better, provoked controversy in Argentina. This led to the series being banned in the country as of September 2021.

Reviewing the live-action Dragonball Evolution for IGN, Christopher Monfette said that Chow Yun-Fat's performance successfully captured Master Roshi's "whimsical, half-drunken essence".
