= Krillin =

Character in the Dragon Ball franchise

- Dragon Ball character
- Krillin, as drawn by Akira Toriyama
- First appearance: Dragon Ball chapter #25: "A Rival? Arrival!!", May 21, 1985 (Weekly Shōnen Jump 1985)
- Created by: Akira Toriyama
- Voiced by: Japanese: Mayumi Tanaka; Aki Kanada (Mini; Dragon Ball Daima); English: Sonny Strait (Funimation/Crunchyroll); Terry Klassen (Ocean); Laurie Steele

In-universe information
- Species: Human
- Occupation: Police officer
- Spouse: Android 18 (wife)
- Children: Marron (daughter)
- Relatives: Android 17 (brother-in-law)

Krillin (Japanese: クリリン, Hepburn: Kuririn), known as Kuririn in Funimation's English subtitles and Viz Media's release of the manga, and Klilyn in Japanese merchandise English translations, is a fictional character in the Dragon Ball manga series created by Akira Toriyama. He is introduced in chapter #25 "A Rival? Arrival!!", first published in Weekly Shōnen Jump magazine on May 21, 1985, as Goku's fellow martial arts student under Master Roshi. As the series progresses, Krillin becomes Goku's closest ally and best friend as he fights every villain along with Goku or before him and is often depicted as the comic relief.

== Design and appearance ==
Toriyama originally created Krillin along with the Tenkaichi Budōkai as a method to help add depth to the story, as his editor Kazuhiko Torishima had stated that the series' protagonist, Goku, was too plain. Torishima explained that to develop Goku's characterization, they needed someone petty and mischievous to provide contrast, thus leading to the introduction of Krillin.

Krillin's appearance stays relatively the same for the majority of the series. He is first introduced at age 13, with a shaved head and still dressed in the yellow-and-orange clothing worn at the monastery at which he had been training. He does not possess a visible nose, and has six spots of moxibustion burns on his forehead called jieba, a reference to the practice of Shaolin monks. Toriyama once stated, seemingly humorously, that Krillin's lack of a nose is because he has a "physical idiosyncrasy" that allows him to breathe through the pores of his skin. Later, he wears the orange gi uniform that is presented to both himself and Goku by Master Roshi in honor of their first martial arts competition. Occasionally, he is seen in casual clothes, but for the most part, continues to dress for training or fighting at all times. During the Frieza arc, he wears Saiyan armor provided by Vegeta, but during the Cell arc he returns to wearing the orange gi, accompanied by a blue short-sleeved undershirt and boots. After the defeat of Cell, Krillin stops shaving his head and grows his black hair out, before later shaving it again during Frieza's resurrection. When he settles down with his family, Krillin is shown wearing a workout outfit consisting of a red "Tacos" T-shirt and brown drawstring pants.

== Appearances ==
=== In Dragon Ball ===
Krillin first appears arriving at Master Roshi's island to become his apprentice, meeting Son Goku, and the two become rivals. However, after doing the hardships that Roshi assigns, the two become friends. After finishing their training, Roshi has Krillin and Goku compete in the 21st Tenkaichi Budōkai. Krillin beats the odored fighter Bacterian, who uses his stench as a weapon, and makes it to the semi-finals. However, he is defeated by Jackie Chun, who is really Roshi in disguise, preventing his students from becoming arrogant with too many victories. Krillin continues to train with Roshi and helps Goku collect the Dragon Balls by fighting against General Blue and participating in Baba Uranai's tournament. However, he is quickly defeated by Dracula Man, who bites down on his head, causing blood to pour out. Three years later, Krillin enters the 22nd Tenkaichi Budōkai. Again, he makes it to the semi-finals by defeating Chiaotzu, but loses to Goku. Soon after, Krillin is killed by a henchman of Piccolo Daimao named Tambourine, who wanted to steal Goku's Dragon Ball. After Goku defeats Piccolo, Krillin is revived by the Dragon Balls. Another 3 years later, Krillin enters the 23rd Tenkaichi Budōkai. This time, however, he only makes it to the quarter-finals, losing to Piccolo Jr. Krillin then tries to intervene in the fight between Piccolo and Goku when Piccolo gains the upper hand, until realizing he is outclassed.

Several years later, in the span of a day, Krillin is attacked by Raditz while attending a reunion, and is unable to save Gohan from Piccolo, who takes him for training. A year afterward, Krillin confronts the Saiyan invaders Vegeta and Nappa along with his friends, following months of training in preparation for their arrival. After Yamcha's death, he avenges his friend by killing most of the Saibamen. In the battle against Nappa, Krillin tries to get involved in his fight with Tien Shinhan after Nappa severs the latter's arm, though is stopped by Nappa. Krillin double teams Nappa with Piccolo, creating multiple copies of themselves with the Tri-Form and failing thanks to the clones cutting their power. Krillin later goes toe-to-toe with Nappa alone, launching a Kienzan at him that Nappa almost catches before Vegeta warns him, and is saved from an attack from Nappa by Piccolo. After Nappa is defeated, and Goku arrives, Krillin requests that he fight Vegeta elsewhere to prevent their friends' corpses from being destroyed. He and Gohan leave the battlefield but return after Gohan worries for Goku, who is being crushed by Vegeta in his Oozaru form. Krillin unsuccessfully attempts cutting Vegeta's tail in a sneak attack, and later is given the Genki-Dama to launch at Vegeta by Goku, which misses initially but is bounded back by Gohan. After Vegeta yields from further conflict given his extensive injuries, Krillin takes Yajirobe's sword and moves in to kill him, but agrees to spare his life per Goku's request. He then travels with Gohan and Bulma to planet Namek to use the Namekian Dragon Balls to revive their dead friends, since the Earth's Dragon Balls vanished due to Piccolo's death. Once there, they save a young Namekian called Dende from death at the hands of Frieza's henchmen. Krillin receives an increase in power from Guru, the grand elder of the Namekians, when he unlocks his hidden potential. After a few close encounters with Vegeta, Krillin and Gohan are forced to team up with him to fight Frieza's strongest warriors, the Ginyu Force. They are overpowered by them until Goku arrives and defeats the Force. After Krillin and Gohan collect the seven Dragon Balls and wish back Piccolo, they begin a battle against Frieza, during which Krillin is stabbed in the chest, removes Frieza's tail following being healed by Dende, thereby distracting Frieza from continuing to crush Gohan to death, and injures Vegeta in an attempt to capitalize on his Saiyan ability to grow stronger when in a near-death state at Vegeta's request. After a long fight between Goku and Frieza, Goku decides to use the Genki-Dama, Krillin giving his energy to Piccolo so he can stall Frieza and attacking Frieza himself with his last bit of strength. When the group recovers from the Genki-Dama, and Frieza emerges unscathed, the latter detonates Krillin from the inside, killing him instantly, which triggers Goku's first ever transformation into a Super Saiyan. After Frieza's defeat, Krillin is revived by the Namekian Dragon Balls.

Krillin trains for three years to confront Doctor Gero, who tries to use his androids to kill Goku. Krillin is momentarily forced to leave his friends with the androids to take Yamcha away from the battlefield in the aftermath of his deadly encounter with Gero, who Krillin finds the base of and signals the others to his location after fighting with Gero. When the Androids, #16, #17 and #18 are released, Krillin is the only hero present that does not engage #17 and #18 due to his fear. After the duo defeat his friends, Krillin unsuccessfully pleads for the androids to spare Goku's life, and becomes infatuated with the female #18 after she kisses him on the cheek, and he then heals his defeated friends. After Krillin encounters the artificial life form Cell, Krillin and Future Trunks travel to Doctor Gero's laboratory basement, where Krillin kills the present timeline version of Cell and the two discover the weakness to the androids is a deactivating controller, which Bulma constructs and gives to Krillin. Krillin soon after encounters #18 with the module and, after a period of deliberation, destroys it. Because of this, regardless of his efforts, Cell absorbs her and achieves his perfect form. Enraged over her loss, Krillin engages Cell in combat, the latter standing in place while Krillin's attacks have no effect and striking Krillin only once, placing Krillin in a near-death state. After Krillin is revived by Trunks, he warns Trunks of Cell's strength, having been able to sense his true power right before being attacked. He moves Vegeta away from the impending fight between Trunks and Cell, healing Vegeta during the battle between the two. He later participates in the Cell Games, a martial arts tournament created by Cell for entertainment, and fights one of the Cell Juniors who attack him and his friends, but is saved by Gohan. After Gohan punches Cell in the stomach, he regurgitates Android #18, and Krillin cares for her comatose body while Gohan destroys Cell. After Cell's death, Krillin then travels to the lookout, where he uses the second wish from the Dragon Balls to remove the bombs from #17 and #18.

Seven years later, Krillin has quit fighting, settled down with #18, with whom he has a daughter named Marron (マーロン, Māron). This left Goku confused, until Krillin explained that Android 18 is a cyborg (meaning she is human still), and she was able to have a baby with him. However, after learning of Goku's return from the afterlife to compete in the 25th Tenkaichi Budōkai, he decides to also participate, also being encouraged to do so for the money by #18. During Goten and Trunks' match, Krillin worries that Trunks' energy attack will hit the crowd. Krillin wins his sole match, against Pintar, during the competition with ease. After the Kaioshin enlists several of Krillin's friends to help him defeat the wizard Babidi, Krillin joins them, in doing so forfeiting his entry in the tournament, but is stopped from assisting any further thanks to Dabura turning him into stone with his spit. Upon Dabura's death however, Krillin is freed and he saves Goten and Trunks from the impact of Vegeta's self-explosion. Krillin later evacuates Earth after Majin Buu's awakening. When Buu has transformed, he finds the temple and locates Krillin and his friends. After escaping the Room of Spirit and Time, he kills everyone present; in the anime, Krillin is the first to be killed after trying in vain to distract Buu so his friends can retreat. During Goku and Vegeta's fight against Buu, Krillin is brought back to life by the Namekian Dragon Balls and gives his energy to Goku's Genki-Dama attack, which is used to destroy Buu.

=== In Dragon Ball Super ===
In the film, Dragon Ball Z: Battle of Gods, Krillin attends Bulma's birthday party; he later backs down from engaging Beerus due to not knowing his power. He then watches Goku's battle with the god. In Dragon Ball Z: Resurrection 'F', Krillin works as a police officer and after having his head shaven by Android 18, joins in the fight against the resurrected Frieza afterward, being one of the survivors of Earth's second destruction before its reversal by Whis.

After the events of the last two films, Krillin assists in acquiring two more members for his universe's team in a tournament, namely Piccolo and Majin Buu, after learning about it from Android #18 and reunites with Trunks, who he tries to stop from attacking Android #18 when she greets him, revealing her as his wife. #18 tries to get Krillin a gift with the Dragon Balls until being convinced by Bulma, her presence alone is good enough for him, and Krillin later participates in a baseball game between Universes 6 and 7. Krillin tries stopping a pair of wrongdoers when he is knocked out by an arriving Gohan in his Saiyaman guise. Krillin agrees to train with Goku after some reluctance and the two travel to get Paradise Grass from an island, encountering large, physical versions of past enemies that Krillin becomes fearful of. The two are revealed to be in the "Forest of Fear", Krillin saving Goku from a phantom of Super Shenron that the two destroy together. Krillin is requested by Goku and Gohan for participation in the Tournament of Power; he accepts. Krillin eliminates Universe 4's Shosa and Majora before being eliminated himself by Frost. Krillin's shouts of encouragement for Android 18 contribute to her victory over Universe 2's Ribrianne, and he feeds Vegeta a Senzu Bean after his elimination by Universe 11's Jiren.

Krillin later appears in a flashback after Frieza intends to provoke the wild Saiyan, Broly, into becoming a Super Saiyan, remembering the time that he murdered Krillin, which sparked Goku's own transformation on Namek. He then promptly kills Broly's father, Paragus, to initiate the transformation in Broly, who was fighting Goku at the time.

Krillin appears in Dragon Ball Super: Super Hero with his wife and friends, having shaved his head clean again, assisting Piccolo and Gohan during the battle against the monstrous Cell Max.

=== In other media ===
Krillin appears in two of the three Dragon Ball films; in the second, Krillin is used as leverage by Lucifer to convince Goku to give the Sleeping Princess to him; and in the third, Krillin trains for the World Martial Arts Tournament, held in Mifan.

Krillin appears in twelve out of the thirteen non-canon Dragon Ball Z films; in the first movie, he assists during the battle against Garlic Junior after he kidnaps Gohan; in the second, Krillin battles Dr. Willow, firing a Kamehameha wave in an unsuccessful attempt to defeat him; in the third, Krillin unintentionally brings Turles to Earth by using the Dragon Balls to restore the forest after a fire and fights the Saiyan's henchmen; in the fourth, Krillin tries to prevent the Earth from being destroyed by a meteorite containing Lord Slug and his henchmen; in the fifth, Krillin shelters Goku after he is injured by Cooler and is defeated in a fight with Salza; in the sixth, Krillin travels to New Namek and combats Cooler's forces; in the seventh, Krillin avoids fighting Android 13 though is injured during the battle; in the eighth, Krillin tours New Planet Vegeta; in the ninth, Krillin participates in a tournament and fights Zangya; in the tenth, Krillin comes to the aid of Trunks and Goten in combating Broly; in the eleventh, Krillin, Android 18, Goten and Trunks combat the bio-engineered Broly in a factory; in the thirteenth, Krillin appears before Hirudegarn is released;. In the anime-only sequel, Dragon Ball GT, an elderly Krillin was once again murdered, this time by a brainwashed Android 17, which angers a tearful Android 18 into fighting her brother. With her assistance, Goku avenges Krillin by destroying the now-transformed #17, called Super 17. Krillin was later resurrected using the Dragon Balls, and later appears on Master Roshi's island, and spars with his old friend, Goku, one last time, until he vanishes suddenly.

== Voice actors ==
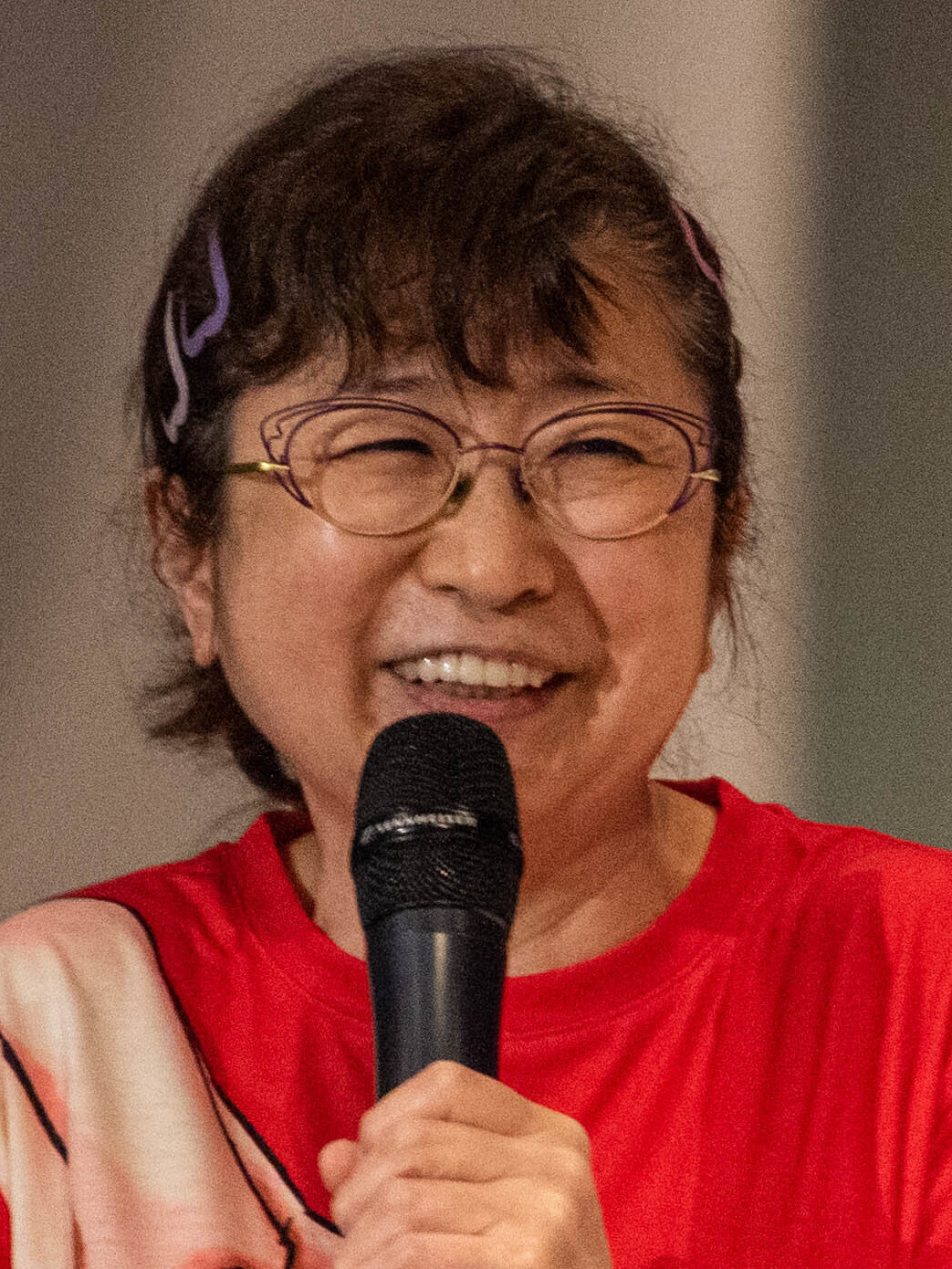
Mayumi Tanaka has been the Japanese voice of Krillin in most Dragon Ball media.

Krillin is voiced by Mayumi Tanaka in the original Japanese anime and in all related media, with the only exception being in Dragon Ball Daima, where a mini version of Krillin was voiced by Aki Kanada. Toriyama chose Tanaka after hearing her portrayal of the protagonist Giovanni in the film Night on the Galactic Railroad. When Krillin and Yajirobe, another character voiced by Tanaka, appeared in the same scenes, she gave the latter a Nagoya dialect in order to distinguish them.

Canadian actress-musician Wanda Nowicki performed the English voice of Krillin (here named Bongo) in the rare Harmony Gold dub of Mystical Adventure. When Dragon Ball Z received a short-lived English dub by Saban Entertainment, Funimation, and Ocean Productions in the mid-1990s, Krillin was voiced by Terry Klassen. He reprised his role in the Ocean dub of the latter half of the series produced by AB Groupe for European and Canadian markets. Another short-lived English dub produced by Harmony Gold in the late 1980s featured Wanda Nowicki as the voice of Krillin. In the Blue Water 2003 re-dub of Dragon Ball, he is voiced by Mike Thiessen. Dan Gascon voiced him in the Blue Water dub of Dragon Ball GT. When the series' full production was taken over by Funimation in the US, Krillin was voiced by Laurie Steele as a child in Dragon Ball and Sonny Strait as an adult in all media released to the US. Strait got cast in the role following his audition in Texas. He found the character's constant deaths amusing and thought him comical: "Krillin is the party. If you don't wish back the party, you're going to be bored." Other English voice actors include Sharon Mann, Brian Beacock, and Julie Maddalena.

== Abilities ==
Krillin has many abilities, including super-strength, super-speed, and the ability to fly using his ki energy, known as Bukū-jutsu (舞空術; lit. 'Air Dance Technique'). His main techniques include the Kamehameha (かめはめ波; lit. 'Kamehame Wave'), an attack he learned from Master Roshi, which enables him to emit a powerful ki energy blast from his hands. Kakusandan (拡散弾; lit. 'Scattershots'), another chi attack, involves firing two blasts, one from each hand, and merging them before directing the blast above an opponent where it will break up and rain down on them, he was only seen using this twice—the first time was very successful as he managed to wipe out three Saibamen with it. From Tien Shinhan, he obtained the Taiyōken (太陽拳; lit. "Solar Fist", renamed "Solar Flare" in the English anime dub), is an attack Krillin is capable of using to blind his opponents, sometimes used to make a quick escape. One of his signature techniques is the Kienzan (気円斬; lit. "Energy Disc Razor", renamed "Destructo Disc" in the English anime dub), where he puts a hand in the air to create an electric floating disc, using it to slice through his enemies. Lacking the other protagonists' advantage of getting stronger every time he is injured, Krillin is however the strongest Earthling and was recognized as having a great array of techniques by Vegeta. In the later parts of the Dragon Ball Super series, Krillin learns to improve and develop variants of his Kienzan and Solar Flare techniques, giving him a tactical edge in battle.

== Appearances in other media ==
In a filler episode of Dragon Ball, Krillin trains with Kame-Sen'nin and after the 23rd Tenka'ichi Budōkai, Krillin can be seen on a plane with his friends.

In filler episodes of Dragon Ball Z, during the Saiyan arc, Krillin fails to tell Chi-Chi of Goku's passing after being tasked with informing her, though does inform Yamcha when coming to one of his baseball games followed by recruiting him for training with Kami, and trains for the Saiyans by facing members of their race from the past using the Pendulum Room. Before the Namek arc, Krillin encounters a group of children who help him find Namek and spends some time on a fake version of the planet searching for Dragon Balls during a distraction and preventing his ship from being stolen. After the Namek arc, Krillin is one of a few not affected by the Black Water Mist set by Garlic Jr., Krillin having to fight his friends before journeying to Kami's Lookout, where he appears to fall under the effects of the Black Water Mist, only to be revealed as faking as part of a plan by Piccolo. Krillin's near-death state by the hands of the Spice Boys, Spice and Vinegar, triggers Gohan's power boost and subsequent killing of the pair. During this time, he breaks up with Maron once he becomes convinced she deserves better than himself, learning afterward that she would have married him. During the Cell arc, he stops Cell from murdering a girl and her younger brother and while waiting for the Cell Games, celebrates Gohan's birthday. In the Boo arc, Krillin charges Boo after Boo escapes the Room of Spirit and Time, being easily defeated and attacks Boo again in the afterlife. After Boo's defeat, Krillin attends a gathering with his family.

In Dragon Ball GT, Krillin is killed by Android #17 after succeeding in snapping Android #18 from his brainwashing and trying to persuade him against his developing villainy. His death prompts #18 to seek vengeance and assist Goku in defeating Super 17. Krillin is revived by Shenlong after the defeat of Omega Shenron and has a match with Goku, who decided to leave Earth. He is shown in GT sporting a mustache, wearing grey pants, shirt, and tie with a cardigan in his few appearances.

Krillin, as seen in Dragon Ball FighterZ

Krillin appears in multiple Dragon Ball-related video games, sometimes as a playable character. He also appears in the crossover game Jump Superstars. In the 1992 Videkko game Dragon Ball: Get Together! Goku World, Krillin, along with Goku, Trunks, Bulma, and Gohan, travels back in time to examine events in the past. In the 2002 game Dragon Ball Z: Budokai, Cell has a nightmare where he accidentally absorbs Krillin and becomes Cellin (セルリン, Serurin), the form making him weaker. In the 2015 video game Dragon Ball: Xenoverse, Krillin serves as a mentor to the player character, teaching his Kienzan. He also appears during Android 18's mentorship of the player, fighting them alongside her. In the Frieza arc, Krillin and Vegeta, being defeated by Frieza, leave Gohan alone to fight the tyrant, causing Goku to exit the healing chamber still wounded. In the final fight against Demigra, Krillin gives energy to the player. In the 2016 game Dragon Ball Xenoverse 2, during the Frieza arc, the player assists Krillin in battling Zarbon, and Krillin later leaves the player to fight Lord Slug and Turles alone per the player's request. In the 2018 game Dragon Ball FighterZ, after clones of various heroes and villains from the series appear, Krillin investigates the origin of them before being knocked out by his own clone. Following Goku rescuing him, the two rescue various allies from clones until encountering Cell, who Krillin becomes aggressive toward for his defeat of Android 18.

In June 1988, Krillin, along with other Dragon Ball characters, was featured in two public safety announcement shorts. The first was entitled The Goku Traffic Safety (悟空の交通安全, Gokū no Kōtsū Anzen), and the second called The Goku Fire Fighting Regiment (悟空の消防隊, Gokū no Shōbō-tai) where he along with Kame-Sen'nin, Yamcha, and later Goku become volunteer fire fighters.

Krillin also appears in the Dragon Ball and One Piece crossover manga Cross Epoch where he and Tony Tony Chopper run the Kuri-Chopa Marine Train Coster. In 2003, he would appear in the interactive feature entitled Kyutai Panic Adventure! (球体パニックアドベンチャー!, Kyūtai Panikku Adobenchā!; Orb Panic Adventure!). Where he and Gohan attempt to save visitors of at Fuji Television's orb section from drowning, while Goku battles Frieza. In the 2004 followup Kyūtai Panic Adventure Returns! (球体パニックアドベンチャーリターンズ!, Kyūtai Panikku Adobenchā Ritānzu!; Orb Panic Adventure Returns!), Krillin is one of the seven Dragon Ball characters who delivers the Dragon Balls to restore the aqua city of Odaiba after Goku and Monkey D. Luffy's battle with Eneru.

Krillin has performed many songs throughout the years. These songs feature his voice actor Mayumi Tanaka in character singing cheerfully about certain thing pertaining to Krillin. First with the song "Asa - Hiru - Yoru - Kimi - Boku" from the album Dragon Ball Z Hit Song Collection IV: Character Special released in 1990. Then with "Ichido wa Kekkon Shitai Manbo" from Dragon Ball Z Hit Song Collection 8: Character Special 2 released in 1991. Where he happily sings about the desire to get married. And the title track from Dragon Ball Z Hit Song Collection 17: Hippy Hoppy Shake!! released in 1995.

Before and after Dragon Ball Z debuting in the U.S. in 1996, Krillin became a part of the country's pop culture. In 1994, the character was featured on the cover of Voodoo Glow Skulls' first full-length album Who Is, This Is?, though his face was removed in the 2012 digital re-release. The song "Blessing" by Chance the Rapper mentions Krillin referencing Android 18 to the lyricist's delight. Krillin appears in an episode of Mad watching the other Dragon Ball characters after they are drafted for the Oakland A's by Billy Beane in a parody of the film Moneyball.

== Reception ==
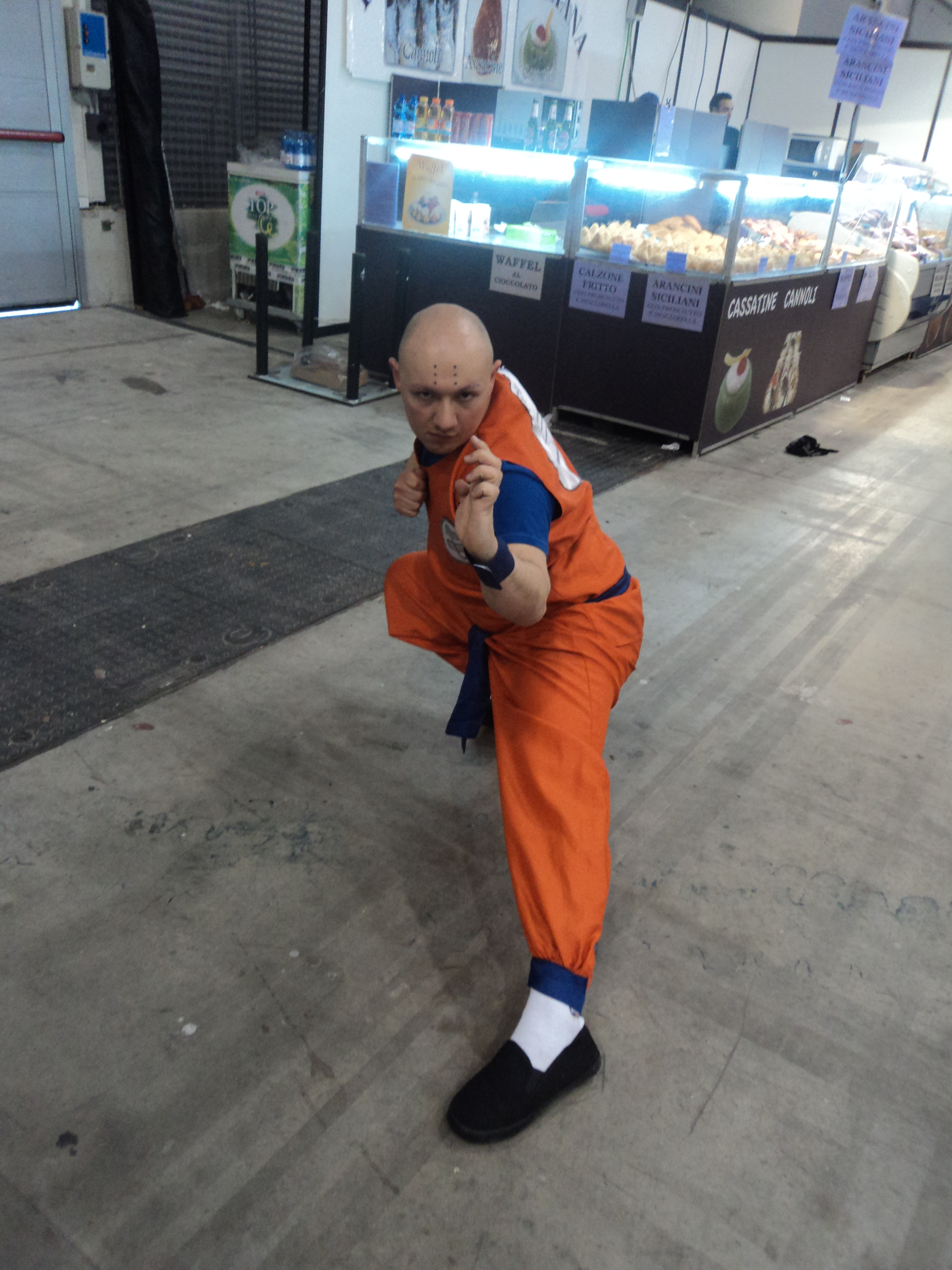
Cosplay of Krillin at Romics 2013 - Spring Edition.

Krillin is a popular character in the series; in 2004, Japanese fans voted him the seventh most popular character. In January 2007, Oricon held a poll in which they asked Japanese fans of manga and anime which characters from any series they would most like to see in spin-off series. Krillin ranked third in the men's poll and sixth in the overall poll. In 2016, Krillin was ranked No. 3 on the saikoplus.com list 10 Most Popular Characters in Dragon Ball Z. When younger fans would belittle the character as weak, Krillin's voice actress Mayumi Tanaka said she would explain to them that Krillin and Yamcha are the strongest earthlings, the other characters are all aliens. She also said it was more fun to play Krillin when he was a dirty-minded bad kid, that she was not fond of him growing his hair out, and was shocked when he died for the first time. Manga author Masashi Kishimoto said that when creating the protagonist of his series Naruto, Krillin was more influential than Goku because the former came across as more human than the protagonist, as he showed several flaws.

Various publications for manga, anime, and other media have commented on Krillin's character, adding praise and criticism to his development and traits in the series. Anime News Network writer Carl Kimlinger liked Krillin and Goku's childhood, noting it to be the warmth that the later Dragon Ball Z anime does not have. Also believing the first anime to have more development than the sequel, Tim Jones from Them Anime Reviews cited how Krillin was not a friend to Goku when first introduced. David F. Smith of IGN comments that Krillin and #18's relationship really help make the storyline more interesting. Additionally, he liked Krillin's appearances in the fight against Cell as he has more screen time than the main character, Goku. Although Chris Beveridge from Mania Entertainment thought that Krillin had a drastic change in Dragon Ball GT, he mentioned that fans from the previous series would like some of its episodes due to the appearance of Krillin and other older characters.
