= Doc Harris (voice actor) =

Canadian radio host and actor (1948–2024)

- Doc Harris in an undated photograph
- Born: Gilbert Arthur Auchinleck; August 3, 1948; Vancouver, British Columbia, Canada
- Died: October 5, 2024 (aged 76); Vancouver, British Columbia, Canada
- Occupations: Radio personality, voice actor
- Years active: 1966–2007 (radio personality)
- Employers: CJZN-FM; CFMS-FM
- Notable work: Narrating the English version of Dragon Ball Z

Gilbert Arthur Auchinleck (August 3, 1948 – October 5, 2024), better known as Doc Harris, was a Canadian voice actor and radio personality. He was known for narrating the English version of the Dragon Ball Z series.

== Early life and career ==
Doc Harris was born Gilbert Arthur Auchinleck on August 3, 1948, in Vancouver. He started his career in 1966 as Gil Harris at CKDA and CFMS-FM Victoria. He also worked under the name of Doc Holliday at radio stations in Sudbury, Hamilton, and Toronto. In 1973, he got a job at a Vancouver station as a disc jockey under the moniker Doc Harris. His broadcasting career in radio stations lasted for almost fifty years. His last radio hearings were in 2007. Harris also had a successful career in voice acting. He was the narrator of more than 200 episodes of Dragon Ball Z, and he voiced characters in Captain N: The Game Master, Barbie and the Rockers: Out of This World, Camp Candy, and My Little Pony: Friendship Is Magic.

Harris died in the early hours of October 5, 2024, at Vancouver General Hospital (VGH), at the age of 76, following a minor surgery in September 2024.

== Filmography ==
=== Television ===
Year	Title	Role	Notes
1989–1991	Captain N: The Game Master	Narrator	
1991	Bucky O'Hare and the Toad Wars!	Toad TV, Harman, Fake Pirate	
1996–2003	Dragon Ball Z	Narrator	Ocean Productions dub
1999–2001	Monster Rancher	Golem	English dub
2019	My Little Pony: Friendship Is Magic	Grogar	5 episodes
2019	Ninjago	Old Guard	Episode: "The Darkness Comes"

=== Film ===
Year	Title	Role	Notes
2003	Bionicle: Mask of Light	Kohlii Announcer	

=== Video games ===
Year	Title	Role	Notes
2003	Mobile Suit Gundam: Encounters in Space	Kirsten Lombard, John Kowen	
2018	Aegis Defenders	Bart	
