= Mike McFarland =

American voice actor (1970–2026)

- Born: July 14, 1970; Texas City, Texas, U.S.
- Died: September 9, 2026 (aged 56); Dallas, Texas, U.S.
- Occupations: Voice actor; ADR director; script writer; line producer
- Years active: 1997–2026
- Website: www.mikemcfarland.com

Michael McFarland (July 14, 1970 – September 9, 2026) was an American voice actor, automated dialogue replacement (ADR) director, script writer and line producer who worked on English dubs of Japanese anime. He was known as the original English voice of Master Roshi and Yajirobe in Funimation's dubs of Dragon Ball and Dragon Ball Z. McFarland's other notable roles included Teppei Sugo in Psycho-Pass, Jean Havoc in Fullmetal Alchemist, Buggy the Clown in the Funimation dub of One Piece, Jean Kirstein in Attack on Titan, and Mashirao Ojiro in My Hero Academia. He voice directed on multiple Funimation titles, including Dragon Ball, Fullmetal Alchemist, Case Closed, and Attack on Titan, the Rebuild of Evangelion films, and Summer Wars.

== Early life and career ==
Mike McFarland was born in Texas City, Texas, on July 14, 1970. McFarland joined Funimation in 1997 and was cast in his first major role as Master Roshi in Dragon Ball two years later. McFarland also served as the ADR director for the Dragon Ball franchise. These roles played an important part in shaping the franchise's legacy in the United States. McFarland would subsequently be cast in other prominent roles, including Buggy the Clown in One Piece, Jean Havoc in Fullmetal Alchemist, and Jean Kirstein in Attack on Titan, among many others. He also worked as the ADR director for numerous titles from ADV Films, Funimation, and Crunchyroll, including YuYu Hakusho, Fullmetal Alchemist, and Attack on Titan, which helped to popularize them in the West. McFarland also worked on modern anime, such as My Hero Academia. Nick Valdez of ComicBook.com wrote that "McFarland has been one of the key drivers behind English dubs and their popularity in the United States".

McFarland stated that he tried to keep the same tone and feel as the original Japanese version when he produced an English dub, rather than creating something different like the English dubs for Crayon Shin-chan and Ghost Stories. He cited the English dubs of Cowboy Bebop and Wolf's Rain as inspirations for his work. McFarland stated that he tried to have a unique approach for every series that he worked on, which included watching the original Japanese version and paying attention to the performance of the voice actors. He also wanted the dialog to be as realistic as possible and to match the tone of the scene.

== Illness and death ==
In January 2025, Central Florida Comic Con announced that McFarland would not be attending the event as previously scheduled due to an illness. Subsequently, voice actress Colleen Clinkenbeard posted that McFarland visited the hospital for what he thought was an ear infection. Instead, he immediately underwent emergency surgery when it was discovered he had a brain tumor. Fellow voice actors J. Michael Tatum and Brandon McInnis launched a GoFundMe page to help McFarland afford specialized care. McFarland had a second surgery in April to locate an unknown infection. In August, it was announced that McFarland had been diagnosed with glioblastoma, a form of brain cancer.

McFarland died in a Dallas health facility on September 9, 2026, at the age of 56. Several anime voice actors offered condolences, including Tatum, Matthew Mercer, AmaLee, Sarah Natochenny, Veronica Taylor, Casey Mongillo, Dawn M. Bennett, Ryan Colt Levy, and Clifford Chapin. Crunchyroll also issued a statement that highlighted the impact he had in the anime industry.

== Filmography ==
=== Anime ===
List of dubbing performances in anime
Year	Title	Role	Notes	Source
1999–2003; 2005	Dragon Ball Z	Master Roshi, Yajirobe, Pui Pui, Mez, Android 8	Funimation dub, assistant ADR director, ADR scriptwriter	
2000	Dragon Ball Z: The History of Trunks	Master Roshi	Funimation dub, TV Special	
2000	Dragon Ball Z: Bardock – The Father of Goku	Tora, Toolo	Funimation dub, TV Special	
2001–2003	Dragon Ball	Master Roshi, Android 8, Yajirobe, Little Flower's Father	Funimation dub, assistant ADR director, ADR director	
2002–2006	YuYu Hakusho	Komada, Butajiri, M3/Kai, Kazemaru, Risho	assistant ADR director	
2002–2003	Fruits Basket	Ritsu Soma		
2003–2005	Dragon Ball GT	Baby, Master Roshi, Yajirobe	Funimation dub	
2004–2005	Fullmetal Alchemist	Jean Havoc	ADR director, ADR scriptwriter	
2004	Dragon Ball GT: A Hero's Legacy	Master Roshi, Baby		
2005	The Galaxy Railways	Bruce J. Speed	Co-ADR director	
2005	Gantz	Giant Buddha Statue, Male Teacher		
2005	Burst Angel	Leo Jinno		
2005	Baki the Grappler	Kitazawa		
2006	Diamond Daydreams	Dr. Amakasu		
2006	Desert Punk	Haru Kawaguchi		
2006	Trinity Blood	Cain NightRoad	ADR director, line producer, Script Adaptation	
2006	Black Cat	Belze Rochefort, Gilberth		
2007	Beet the Vandel Buster	Alside		
2007	School Rumble	Jiro Yoshidayama		
2007	Mushi-shi	Koro	ADR director, line producer, ADR scriptwriter	
2007	Gunslinger Girl	Franco, Giorgio	ADR director, line producer	
2007	Beck: Mongolian Chop Squad		Music director	
2007–2026	One Piece	Buggy the Clown, Helmeppo (episode 68 onwards), Richie, Eyelash, Masshikaku, Yokozuna	ADR director, ADR scriptwriter, ADR Producer (Funimation dub)	
2008	Ouran High School Host Club	Ryoji "Ranka" Fujioka	line producer	
2008–2009	Hetalia: Axis Powers	Estonia	line producer	
2009	Romeo × Juliet	Tybalt		
2009	Kenichi: The Mightiest Disciple	Ukita Kozo		
2009	Eden of the East	Osamu Yamamoto	ADR director, line producer	
2010	Case Closed	George Kaminski, Jeremiah, Michel, Albert Jordenly, Archie Gailand, Old Man, Dr. Charles Lanning, Stu Hogan	ADR director	
2010	Oh! Edo Rocket	Ankles		
2010	Shiki	Yuuki	ADR director, line producer	
2010–2013; 2017–2018	Dragon Ball Z Kai	Roshi, Yajirobe, Pui Pui, Android 8		
2010–2011	Fullmetal Alchemist: Brotherhood	Jean Havoc	ADR director, line producer	
2011	Phantom: Requiem for the Phantom	Abel		
2011	Fairy Tail	Nab Lasaro		
2011	Heaven's Lost Property	Sky Master		
2012	Panty & Stocking with Garterbelt	Flat U. Lance		
2012	Space Battleship Yamato 2199	Saburo Kato		
2012	A Certain Magical Index	Hajime Hitotsui		
2013	Lupin the Third: The Woman Called Fujiko Mine	Goemon Ishikawa		
2013	Last Exile: Fam, the Silver Wing	Alex Row		
2013	Sankarea: Undying Love	Jogoro Furuya		
2013	Aquarion Evol	Izumo Kamurogi		
2013	Hyperdimension Neptunia: The Animation		ADR director, scriptwriter	
2014–2024	Attack on Titan	Jean Kirstein	ADR director	
2015	Noragami	Rabo	ADR director	
2015	Attack on Titan: Junior High	Jean Kirstein	ADR director	
2015	Parasite Dolls	Meyers		
2015	Blood Blockade Battlefront	Deldro Brody	ADR director	
2015	Show by Rock!!	Crow		
2016–2025	My Hero Academia	Mashirao Ojiro, Ectoplasm, Bird Hero Hitchcock-a-Doodle	ADR director (season 7)	
2016	Grimgar of Fantasy and Ash	Brittany	Co-ADR director	
2016	Chaos Dragon	Kaguraba Raihou Gramstahl	scriptwriter, assistant ADR director	
2016	Servamp	Belkia		
2016	One-Punch Man	Carnage Kabuto	ADR script adaptation	
2016	No-Rin		ADR director	
2016	Barakamon		ADR director	
2016	Handa-kun		ADR director	
2016	Trickster	Yoshio's Father	ADR director	
2017	Sakura Quest	Doku (Young)		
2017	Tokyo Ghoul	Kotaro Amon	ADR director; also :re	
2017	Hyouka		ADR director (eps 1–12, 18–22)	
2017	18if		ADR director	
2017–2019	Dragon Ball Super	Master Roshi, Yajirobe	Funimation dub	
2018	Space Battleship Yamato 2202	Saburo Kato		
2018	Junji Ito Collection	Mori	ADR director (eps 1–10)	
2018	Legend of the Galactic Heroes	Murai		
2018	Double Decker! Doug & Kirill	William Jefferson	ADR director	
2018	That Time I Got Reincarnated as a Slime	Fuze		
2018–2021	Zombie Land Saga	Hochu		
2019	Boogiepop and Others	Jin Asukai	5 episodes, ADR director (eps 1–9; 14–18), assistant ADR director (eps 10–13)	
2019	Magical Girl Spec-Ops Asuka	Kim Kanth		
2019	The Quintessential Quintuplets		assistant ADR director	
2019	Afterlost	Taiyo	ADR director	
2019–2021	Fruits Basket	Ritsu Soma	2019 reboot	
2019	Arifureta: From Commonplace to World's Strongest		ADR director	
2019	Kemono Michi	Saigo		
2019	Dr. Stone	Argo	ADR director Eps. 58-69	
2019	African Office Worker	Sheep		
2020	Bofuri	Dread		
2021	Bottom-tier Character Tomozaki		Co-ADR director	
2022	Odd Taxi	Hiroshi Odokawa	Crunchyroll dub; ADR script writer	
2022	Date A Live IV	Big Bad Wolf		
2023	Trigun Stampede	E.G. Mine		

=== Animation ===
List of voice performances in animation
Year	Title	Role	Notes	Source
2016–2017	RWBY	Fennec Albain, Mayor	Volume 4–5	

=== Films ===
List of dubbing performances in direct-to-video and television films
Year	Title	Role	Notes	Source
1998	Dragon Ball: Sleeping Princess in Devil's Castle	Master Roshi, Count Lucifer, Ghastel	Funimation dub	
1999	Chuck E. Cheese in the Galaxy 5000	Harry the Hermit	Chuck E Cheese special	
2000	Dragon Ball: Mystical Adventure	Master Roshi, Emperor Pilaf, Gatchans		
2001	Dragon Ball Z: Lord Slug	Master Roshi, Yajirobe		
2002	Dragon Ball Z: Cooler's Revenge	Doore, Yajirobe, Master Roshi	assistant ADR director	
2002	Dragon Ball Z: The Return of Cooler	Master Roshi, Yajirobe		
2003	Dragon Ball Z: Super Android 13	Master Roshi		
2003	Dragon Ball: The Path to Power	Master Roshi, Android 8		
2003	Dragon Ball Z: Broly – The Legendary Super Saiyan	Master Roshi	ADR director	
2004	Dragon Ball Z: Bojack Unbound	Master Roshi	Funimation dub	
2005	Dragon Ball Z: Dead Zone	Master Roshi	Funimation dub	
2005	Dragon Ball Z: The World's Strongest	Master Roshi	Funimation dub	
2005	Dragon Ball Z: The Tree of Might	Master Roshi	Funimation dub	
2006	Dragon Ball Z: Wrath of the Dragon	Master Roshi	Funimation dub	
2006	Fullmetal Alchemist: Conqueror of Shamballa	Jean Havoc	ADR director	
2008	Vexille	Murata	ADR director, line producer	
2010	Evangelion 1.0: You Are Not Alone	Makoto Hyuga, Eva	ADR director, line producer	
2010	Summer Wars	Shota Jinnouchi	ADR director, line producer	
2010	Dragon Ball: Curse of the Blood Rubies	Master Roshi	Funimation dub	
2012	Fullmetal Alchemist: The Sacred Star of Milos		ADR director	
2011	Evangelion: 2.0 You Can (Not) Advance	Makoto Hyuga	ADR director, line producer	
2012	Dragon Age: Dawn of the Seeker	Lazarro	ADR director	
2012	Tales of Vesperia: The First Strike	Yurgis	ADR director, line producer	
2013	Wolf Children	Kuroda	ADR director	
2013	Blood-C: The Last Dark	Kuroto Magami	ADR director	
2014	Hal	Nepalese	ADR director	
2014	One Piece: Film Z	Helmeppo		
2014	Dragon Ball Z: Battle of Gods	Master Roshi		
2014	Evangelion: 3.0 You Can (Not) Redo	Makoto Hyuga	ADR director	
2015	Dragon Ball Z: Resurrection 'F'	Master Roshi		
2015	Joseph: Beloved Son, Rejected Slave, Exalted Ruler	Joseph		
2016	The Boy and the Beast		ADR director	
2016	Psycho-Pass: The Movie	Teppei Sugo		
2016	The Empire of Corpses	Alexei Karamazov	ADR director	
2016	Escaflowne	Mole Man	Funimation dub	
2019	Dragon Ball Super: Broly	Male Saiyan C		
2019	One Piece: Stampede	Buggy, Helmeppo	ADR Director	
2022	Sing a Bit of Harmony	Class Teacher		
2023	Psycho-Pass Providence	Teppei Sugo		

=== Video games ===
List of dubbing performances in video games
Year	Title	Role	Notes	Source
2002–2024	Dragon Ball games	Master Roshi, Yajirobe, Baby Vegeta, Android 8, Pui Pui, Doore, Tora, Dodoria	Dodoria in Raging Blast only	
2004	Seven Samurai 20XX	Additional voices		
2009	Case Closed: The Mirapolis Investigation	George Kaminsky		
2012	Street Fighter X Tekken	Paul Phoenix		
2016	Street Fighter V	Nash		
2017	Orcs Must Die! Unchained	Blackpaw		
2020	One-Punch Man: A Hero Nobody Knows	Carnage Kabuto		
2020	Fire Emblem Heroes	Caellach		
