= Ceyli Delgadillo =

American actress

- Occupation: Voice actress
- Years active: 1997–2001
- Notable credit(s): Dragon Ball as Kid Goku and Young Dende

Ceyli Juliann Delgadillo is a former voice actress from Arlington, Texas.

She worked for Funimation from 1997 to 2001. Her most notable roles were as young Goku in the Dragon Ball movies Sleeping Princess in Devil's Castle and Mystical Adventure, and also young Dende in Dragon Ball Z.

She left Funimation in 2001 to move to Los Angeles. Stephanie Nadolny replaced her as the voice of Kid Goku and Laura Bailey replaced her as the young voice of Dende respectively. To date, all of her work as Dende has been redubbed by Bailey for the remastered release of DBZ, however all her vocal work as Goku has been retained over the years.

== Roles ==
- Dragon Ball: Mystical Adventure - Goku
- Dragon Ball: Sleeping Princess in Devil's Castle - Goku
- Dragon Ball Z - Dende (Seasons 3–6, original release)
- Dragon Ball Z: Bardock - The Father of Goku - Additional Voices
- Yu Yu Hakusho - Little Boy (Ep. 1)
