= Tokizō Tsuchiya =

Anime producer and director

Tokizō Tsuchiya (土屋登喜蔵, Tsuchiya Tokizō) is a producer and planning director of anime and other TV series for Fuji TV. He has also worked as a producer on the movies related to various TV series with which he was involved.

== Projects ==
- Ashita Tenki ni Naare (planning)
- Dr. Slump - Arale-chan (planning, producer)
- Dragon Ball (producer)
- FNS Bangumi Taikō NG Taishō (organization)
- Futari Taka (planning)
- High School! Kimengumi (TV series and movie, planning)
- Kagaku Kyūjotai Techno Boyger (producer)
- Patalliro! (planning)
