= Dragon Ball: Curse of the Blood Rubies =

- Theatrical release poster

Japanese name
- Kana: ドラゴンボール
Transcriptions
- Revised Hepburn: Doragon Bōru
- Directed by: Daisuke Nishio
- Written by: Yoshifumi Yūki (Note: Screenplay Composition)
- Screenplay by: Toshiki Inoue
- Based on: Dragon Ball by Akira Toriyama
- Starring: see below
- Cinematography: Motoaki Ikegami
- Edited by: Shin'ichi Fukumitsu
- Music by: Shunsuke Kikuchi
- Production company: Toei Animation
- Distributed by: Toei Company, Ltd.
- Release date: December 20, 1986 (Japan)
- Running time: 50 minutes
- Country: Japan
- Language: Japanese
- Box office: ¥1.36 billion (est.)

Dragon Ball: Curse of the Blood Rubies (Note: Known in Japan as Dragon Ball during its initial theatrical release and later retitled Dragon Ball: The Legend of Shenlong (Japanese: ドラゴンボール 神龍の伝説, Hepburn: Doragon Bōru Shenron no Densetsu) for its home video release) is a 1986 Japanese animated martial arts fantasy adventure film and the first alternate continuity in a series of feature films in the Dragon Ball anime franchise, based on the manga of the same name by Akira Toriyama. The film is a modified adaptation of the initial story arc of the manga, with the original character King Gurumes substituting Emperor Pilaf's role as the main antagonist. It depicts how Goku meets up with Bulma, as well as Oolong, Yamcha, Puar and finally Master Roshi during his first search for the Dragon Balls. Gurumes and the other new characters were designed for the film by Toriyama.

Curse of the Blood Rubies was originally released in Japan on December 20, 1986, at the Toei Manga Matsuri (東映まんがまつり) film festival, where it was shown as part of a triple feature along with Gegege no Kitarō Gekitotsu!! Ijigen Yōkai no Dai Hanran and Kinnikuman – Seigi Choujin vs. Senshi Choujin. It was followed by Dragon Ball: Sleeping Princess in Devil's Castle.

== Plot ==
Since finding the Blood Rubies (リッチストーン, Ricchi Sutōn; Ritch Stones (Note: called "Earth Rubies" in the 1989 English adaptation)), King Gurumes has fallen under a curse that turns him into a large, purple monster and makes his hunger insatiable. He hopes to wish the curse away with the Dragon Balls. Gurumes' soldiers have destroyed the homes and lands of farmers within his kingdom in their search for Blood Rubies. A little girl, Pansy, decides to go and seek help.

Goku, a young monkey-tailed boy with special strength, lives alone in the wilderness of Mount Paozu. He encounters Bulma, a teenage girl who is also searching for the Dragon Balls. Goku tells her that his grandpa gave him a Dragon Ball before he died. Gurumes' two main enforcers, Pasta and Bongo, arrive at Goku's home and steal his Dragon Ball. They flee in their fighter jet, but Goku uses his Power Pole to defeat them. Later that night, Goku and Bulma find Pansy being accosted by Oolong, who has the ability to shape-shift into various forms. Oolong flees when Goku proves his strength by destroying a large tree. Goku chases Oolong and knocks him down with his Power Pole, reverting him back to his true form, a pig. Yamcha and his sidekick Puar threaten Oolong and Goku after they end up in Yamcha's territory. Goku fights back against Yamcha, but their duel is cut short when Bulma arrives. Yamcha is paralyzed in fear at the sight of Bulma and falls off a cliff, before he and Puar retreat. At Oolong's campout, Pansy tells Bulma and the others about her plan to visit Master Roshi, who could help stop King Gurumes. Yamcha and Puar listen in on the conversation. The next day, they set off to find the Dragon Balls for themselves. Yamcha vows to wish away his shyness around girls.

Goku, Bulma, Pansy, and Oolong arrive on Master Roshi's island. Yamcha, who arrived earlier, has tricked Roshi into thinking Goku is there to steal his shell. To find out who's telling the truth, Roshi summons the Flying Nimbus, a magic cloud which only an honest person can ride. Goku successfully rides the cloud, and Yamcha flees. Roshi says he will only give Bulma his Dragon Ball if she shows him her breasts. Bulma has Oolong transform into her to trick Roshi, which proves to be successful. Pasta and Bongo arrive in a submarine and attack the island. One of Bulma's two Dragon Balls is stolen, and Roshi's house is destroyed. Roshi powers up and uses the Kamehameha to destroy the submarine, while Pasta and Bongo flee in an escape jet. Pansy asks Roshi to help her defeat King Gurumes, but he declines and assures Pansy that Goku and Bulma will be all the help she needs.

The next day, the team journey to King Gurumes' palace and are immediately attacked by the king's air force. Bulma, Oolong, and Pansy are shot down while Goku has an aerial duel with Bongo, which ends with Goku destroying Bongo's hovercraft. Yamcha and Puar also arrive and infiltrate the palace, where they meet up with the group. Yamcha is attacked by Pasta, but he is unable to fight back, so they flee with Pasta in hot pursuit. Goku defeats Bongo by knocking him through a wall with his Power Pole, and they all end up in King Gurumes' throne room. Fueled by both his own curse and hunger, Gurumes grows to gigantic size before the very eyes of the group. After crushing Bongo flat, Gurumes attacks Goku to get the last Dragon Ball. Goku tries the Kamehameha (which he already learned from Master Roshi), but it fails to destroy Gurumes. Bulma realizes the other six Dragon Balls are inside Gurumes' stomach, so she throws her Dragon Ball into his mouth. Shenron erupts from Gurumes' body and offers to grant one wish. Pansy wishes for her land to be peaceful and beautiful again. Shenron then removes all the Blood Rubies and makes the land fertile again. Gurumes' curse is broken; Yamcha and Bulma decide to date; and Goku heads off to Master Roshi's island to train with him.

== Cast ==
Character name	Voice actor				
Character name	Japanese	English			
Character name	Japanese	Intersound, Inc./Harmony Gold (1989)	Funimation/Josanne B. Lovick Productions/BLT Productions Ltd. (1994/1995)	Unknown/AB Groupe (c. 2003)	Funimation (2010)
Goku	Masako Nozawa	Zero	Zero (1994 test version)	Jodi Forrest	Colleen Clinkenbeard
Goku	Masako Nozawa	Barbara Goodson	Saffron Henderson	Jodi Forrest	Colleen Clinkenbeard
Bulma	Hiromi Tsuru	Lena	Lena (1994 test version)	Bloomer	Monica Rial
Bulma	Hiromi Tsuru	Wendee Lee	Maggie Blue O'Hara; Lalainia Lindbjerg (Ep. 2 scenes; 1995 version only)	Sharon Mann	Monica Rial
Oolong	Naoki Tatsuta	Mao Mao	Chester (1994 test version)	David Gasman	Bryan Massey
Oolong	Naoki Tatsuta	Dave Mallow; Barry Stigler (transformations)	Alec Willows	David Gasman	Bryan Massey
Yamcha	Tōru Furuya	Zedaki	Sedaki (1994 test version)	David Gasman	Christopher Sabat
Yamcha	Tōru Furuya	Kerrigan Mahan	Ted Cole	David Gasman	Christopher Sabat
Pu-erh	Naoko Watanabe	Squeaker	Prudence (1994 test version)/Puar (1995 version)	Jodi Forrest	Puar
Pu-erh	Naoko Watanabe	Cheryl Chase	Kathy Morse	Jodi Forrest	Brina Palencia
Kame-Sennin (Turtle Hermit)	Kōhei Miyauchi	Master Roshi		Mutenrashi (Crafty Turtle)	Master Roshi
Kame-Sennin (Turtle Hermit)	Kōhei Miyauchi	Clifton Wells	Michael Donovan	Ed Marcus	Mike McFarland
Shenlong	Kenji Utsumi	Dragon God	Eternal Dragon	Sacred Dragon	Shenron
Shenlong	Kenji Utsumi	Steve Kramer	Doug Parker	Ed Marcus	Christopher Sabat
Pansy (パンジ, Panji)	Tomiko Suzuki	Penny		Sharon Mann	Cherami Leigh
Pansy (パンジ, Panji)	Tomiko Suzuki	Rebecca Forstadt	Andrea Libman	Sharon Mann	Cherami Leigh
Pasta (パスタ, Pasuta)	Mami Koyama	Aldevia	Raven	Jodi Forrest	Kate Oxley
Pasta (パスタ, Pasuta)	Mami Koyama	Edie Mirman	Teryl Rothery	Jodi Forrest	Kate Oxley
Vongo (ボンゴ, Bongo)	Gorō Naya	Major Domo	Domo	Ed Marcus	Bongo
Vongo (ボンゴ, Bongo)	Gorō Naya	Michael McConnohie	Robert O. Smith	Ed Marcus	Jonathan Brooks
King Gourmeth (グルメス大王, Gurumesu Daiō)	Shūichirō Moriyama	King Gurumes		Gourmet	King Gurumes
King Gourmeth (グルメス大王, Gurumesu Daiō)	Shūichirō Moriyama	Mike Reynolds	Garry Chalk	Paul Bandey	Jeremy Inman
Pansy's father	Shōzō Iizuka	Penny's father		Ed Marcus	Brian Mathis
Pansy's father	Shōzō Iizuka	Steve Kramer	Michael Donovan	Ed Marcus	Brian Mathis
Pansy's mother	Reiko Suzuki	Penny's mother		Sharon Mann	Dana Schultes
Pansy's mother	Reiko Suzuki	Unknown	Kathy Morse	Sharon Mann	Dana Schultes
Turtle	Daisuke Gōri	Dan Woren	Doug Parker	Paul Bandey	Christopher Sabat
Robot	Unknown	Stephen Apostolina	Doug Parker	David Gasman	Peter Hawkinson
Villagers	Masaharu Satō; Kazumi Tanaka; Masato Hirano		Michael Donovan; Doug Parker; Kathy Morse	Paul Bandey; David Gasman; Ed Marcus; Sharon Mann	Kevin Leasur; Eric Cherry; Daniel Fredrick; Charlie Campbell; Micah Solusod
Soldiers	Kōji Totani	Barry Stigler; Stephen Apostolina	Doug Parker	David Gasman	Zach Bolton
Pilots	Ryōichi Tanaka; Michitaka Kobayashi	—N/a	—N/a	—N/a	—N/a
Narrator	Jōji Yanami	Michael McConnohie	Jim Conrad	Ed Marcus	John Swasey

== Music ==
- OP (Opening Theme):
  - "Makafushigi Adventure!"
    - Lyrics by Yuriko Mori
    - Music by Takeshi Ike
    - Arranged by Kōhei Tanaka
    - Performed by Hiroki Takahashi
- ED (Ending Theme):
  - "Romantic Ageru yo" (ロマンティックあげるよ, Romantikku Ageru yo; "I'll Give You Romance")
    - Lyrics by Takemi Yoshida
    - Music by Takeshi Ike
    - Arranged by Kōhei Tanaka
    - Performed by Ushio Hashimoto

=== English dub soundtracks ===
The BLT English dubs replace the Japanese score with music composed by Peter Berring, with a theme song by Peter Berring and Brian Griffith, and performed by Canadian singer Dave Steele. This theme song was heard on the BLT dub of the first thirteen episodes of the original Dragon Ball.

The Funimation English dub featured an English version of the Japanese theme songs performed by Jimi Tunnell and Daphne Gere respectively, which were recorded for their in-house English adaptation of the television series.

== Releases ==
=== Box office ===
At the Japanese box office, the film sold 2.4 million tickets and earned a net distribution rental income of ¥800 million ($5 million),.

=== English-language versions ===
Curse of the Blood Rubies (originally titled Dragon Ball: The Movie, and later Dragon Ball: The Legend of Shenron) was originally licensed to Harmony Gold USA who dubbed and released the film in conjunction with Mystical Adventure, simply titled Dragonball. The dub aired on December 28, 1989, as a special to the TV series on WPSG Philly 57 in Philadelphia. It was edited for content, and most of the characters were renamed. The audio track was recorded at InterSound, inc. in Hollywood, California, United States. Because of the failure with Harmony Gold's release of the franchise, the Dragon Ball series was dropped, and the two films were eventually picked up by Funimation Productions in the mid-1990s.

The second English version of Curse of the Blood Rubies, which was produced by Funimation as a pilot to sell the Dragon Ball series to American syndicators, was originally premiered on syndication on September 9, 1995 (along with the first episode of the Emperor Pilaf Saga; "Secret of the Dragon Balls"), and released on VHS in North America by Trimark on September 24, 1996. However, unlike the previous dub, most of the series' returning characters got to keep their original names (though this dub did make use of most of the supporting character names from the 1989 dub, such as Penny). There was also an obscure version of the dub (here subtitled Curse of the Blood Rubie [sic]), which used some of the names from the Harmony Gold version, and which appears to have been produced as a test in 1994. In addition, the dialogue was loosely based on the 1989 dub script. The audio track for this English dub was recorded in Vancouver, BC, Canada. The film was also edited for content and used a scene from the second episode of the TV series to fill in lost time (the scene was not included in the 1994 demo version). The dub was later released on Region 1 DVD on October 24, 2000, as part of the Saga of Goku set from Trimark along with Funimation/BLT Productions' original dub of the first thirteen episodes of the TV series. The 1995 English dub was also released on DVD in Australia by Madman Entertainment as part of the Saga of Goku set released to Region 4 DVD, despite using Funimation's newer in-house dub of the first thirteen episodes. This version was also released on VCD in Malaysia by Speedy Video, as Dragon Ball: The Movie. Unlike most of the other films in the franchise, Speedy Video had never dubbed this film, instead using the 1995 version.

Another English dub of the film was produced for European markets by AB Groupe and dubbed in France and aired in the UK as The Legend of Shenron on Toonami UK in the summer of 2005, and was released on DVD as the alternate English language track on some European releases. It is likely that the cast used for this version consists of English-speaking voice actors in Paris, France.

On April 6, 2010, Funimation announced that Curse of the Blood Rubies would be released to a bilingual DVD on July 27, 2010, but the release was delayed to December 28, 2010. Funimation announced the voice cast for a new English dub of the film on November 12, 2010. The 2010 English dub is mostly unedited (the only visual edits being to the title and credit sequences), but the script was mostly recycled from the 1995 English dub (which itself was based on the 1989 dub script), with the most notable change being all the character names reverting to their originals. The audio was recorded in Dallas, Texas. However, very few voice actors from Funimation's English dub of the original Dragon Ball series reprised their roles for this film, with their replacements from the dub of Dragon Ball Z Kai (in production at the time) being used instead.

The film might possibly have been dubbed before all the aforementioned versions by Frontier Enterprises, a Tokyo-based company that specialized in dubbing Japanese films and TV series, including the Godzilla series and Lupin III: The Mystery of Mamo. This was promulgated by an interview with DJ/voice actor Richard Nieskens, who indicated that he worked on dubbing Dragon Ball Z in December 1986 [sic] as his first voice acting job, though he was likely referring to this film, given Frontier's activity at the time. This brings the total number of English versions to six, if the 1994 test dub by Funimation and BLT Productions is counted, the most dubs an animated film has ever received.

The film (containing the 2010 dub) was later re-released in a Dragon Ball Movie 4-Pack on February 8, 2011.
