= Dragon Ball (TV series) =

Japanese anime television series

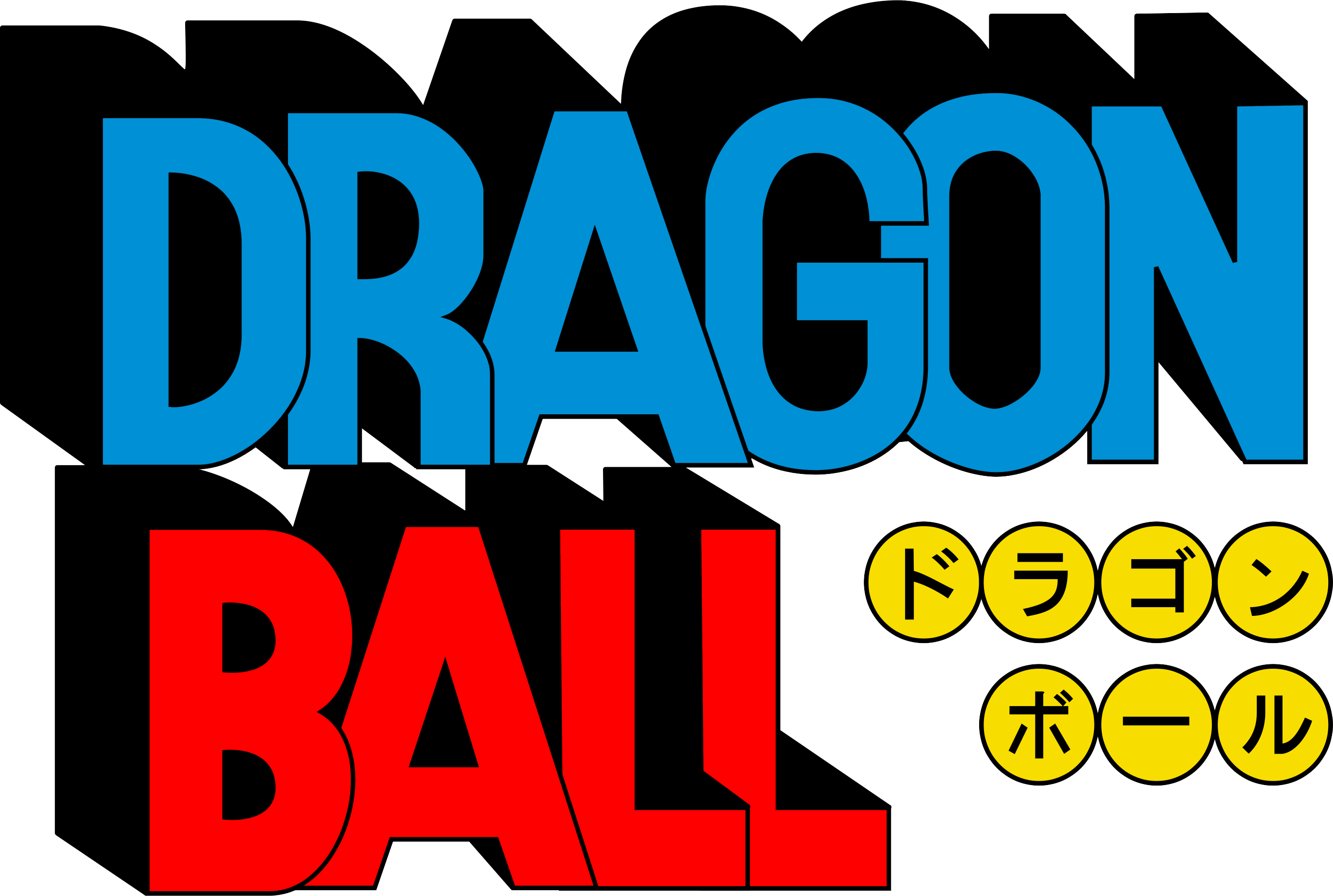
- ドラゴンボール; Doragon Bōru
- Genre: Adventure; Fantasy comedy; Martial arts
- Based on: Dragon Ball by Akira Toriyama (Note: Specifically, chapters 1–194 of the original Japanese publication)
- Developed by: Takao Koyama (#131–153) (Note: No screenwriter was credited for series composition or scriptwriting until episode 131.)
- Directed by: Minoru Okazaki; Daisuke Nishio
- Voices of: Masako Nozawa; Hiromi Tsuru; Mayumi Tanaka; Kōhei Miyauchi; Tōru Furuya; Hirotaka Suzuoki
- Music by: Shunsuke Kikuchi
- Opening theme: "Makafushigi Adventure!" by Hiroki Takahashi
- Ending theme: "Romantic Ageru yo" by Ushio Hashimoto
- Country of origin: Japan
- Original language: Japanese
- No. of episodes: 153 (list of episodes)

Production
- Producers: Tokizō Tsuchiya; (#1–101); Kenji Shimizu; (#1–28, 92–153); Junichi Ishikawa; (#131–132)
- Cinematography: List: Motoaki Ikegami; Kiyoshi Saeki (#19, 21); Noriko Suzuki; (#20, 22, 97–103 odd); Takao Satō (#44–64 even; 67–77 odd); Tetsu Nakamura; (#66, 71, 76); Hirotoshi Rissen (#80); Kenji Ninomiya (#93); Tetsuo Ōfuji; (#98–152 even); Katsunori Maehara; (#105–153 odd)
- Editor: Shinichi Fukumitsu
- Running time: 24 minutes
- Production companies: Fuji Television; Toei Animation

Original release
- Network: Fuji Television
- Release: February 26, 1986 – April 19, 1989

Related
- List of all Dragon Ball series; List of all Dragon Ball films

Dragon Ball (Japanese: ドラゴンボール, Hepburn: Doragon Bōru) is a Japanese anime television series produced by Toei Animation. It ran for a total of 153 episodes on Fuji Television and its FNS affiliates from February 26, 1986, to April 19, 1989. The series adapts the first 194 chapters of the manga series Dragon Ball by Akira Toriyama, which was published in Weekly Shōnen Jump from 1984 to 1995. The anime was broadcast in 81 countries worldwide and is the first animated television series in the Dragon Ball franchise. It follows the adventures of Goku, a young eccentric boy with a monkey tail and exceptional strength who has a passion for fighting and battling enemies.

Animated film adaptations based on the series include: Dragon Ball: Curse of the Blood Rubies (1986), Dragon Ball: Sleeping Princess in Devil's Castle (1987), Dragon Ball: Mystical Adventure (1988), and the 10th anniversary film, Dragon Ball: The Path to Power (1996). The series was immediately followed by a 1989 direct sequel, titled Dragon Ball Z, which had its own follow-ups with Dragon Ball GT, Dragon Ball Super, and Dragon Ball Daima. The English dubbed version of the original Dragon Ball series released in the United States was edited for content and dialogue.

Dragon Ball has been positively received, and is considered to be one of the best anime series of all time.

== Plot ==
=== Emperor Pilaf Saga ===
The series begins with a young monkey-tailed boy named Goku who lives alone in a forest befriending a teenage girl named Bulma, who is in search of the seven mystical Dragon Balls (ドラゴンボール), one of which is in Goku's possession. Together, they go on an adventure to find the balls, which summon the eternal dragon Shenron and grants whoever summons him any wish. The journey leads Goku to meeting Master Roshi and a confrontation with the shape-shifting pig Oolong, as well as a desert bandit named Yamcha and his companion Pu'ar, and the Ox-King, who all later become allies; Chi-Chi, whom Goku unknowingly agrees to marry; and Emperor Pilaf, a blue-skinned imp who seeks the Dragon Balls to fulfill his desire for world domination. Oolong stops Pilaf from getting his wish by wishing for a pair of perfect panties. After each wish, the Dragon Balls turn to stone and scatter across the Earth, remaining unusable for one year.

=== World Martial Arts Tournament Saga ===
After finding the Dragon Balls and using them, Goku undergoes rigorous training under world renowned martial artist Master Roshi in order to fight in the World Martial Arts Tournament (天下一武道会, "Tenkaichi Budōkai"), a competitive fighting tournament that attracts fighters from all around the world. A monk named Krillin becomes Goku's training partner and rival, but they quickly become best friends. After training with Master Roshi for a few months, Goku and Krillin start in the tournament, which is held every five years. They battle various opponents, and Yamcha fights a mysterious man named Jackie Chun, who looks and fights oddly similar to Master Roshi. As the tournament continues, Goku and Jackie Chun are the final fighters, and after hours of battle, Jackie Chun realizes Goku is mimicking all of his moves. Recognizing that Goku is shorter, he lunges a flying kick at Goku. Knowing that Goku will do one right back, Jackie Chun's longer leg can reliably reach Goku and knock him out, defeating him.

=== Red Ribbon Army Saga ===
After the tournament, Goku sets out on his own to recover the Dragon Ball his deceased grandfather left him and encounters a terrorist organization known as the Red Ribbon Army, whose diminutive leader, Commander Red, wants to collect the Dragon Balls so he can use them to become taller. Goku mostly single-handedly defeats the entire group, including Mercenary Tao, a feared assassin the Red Ribbon hired; whom Goku originally loses to, but after training under the hermit Korin, easily beats. After defeating Tao, Goku sets his sights on the Red Ribbon Army headquarters, where he plans to take the two Dragon Balls in the army's possession. After defeating the Red Ribbon Army, Goku reunites with his friends and they go to Fortuneteller Baba to locate the last remaining Dragon Ball in order to resurrect Upa's father, who was defeated by Tao, but they have to defeat all five of Baba's fighters first. After defeating Baba's fighters and finding the last Dragon Ball, Goku resurrects Upa's father, Bora, and sets out on his own to train for three years.

=== King Piccolo Saga ===
Goku and his friends reunite at the World Martial Arts Tournament three years later and meet Master Roshi's rival and Tao's brother, Master Shen, and his students Tien Shinhan and Chiaotzu, who vow to exact revenge for Tao's apparent death at the hands of Goku. Krillin is murdered after the tournament and Goku tracks down and is defeated by his killer, Tambourine, and the evil King Piccolo, who was freed by Emperor Pilaf after being sealed away by Master Mutaito for destroying and trying to take over the world. Goku meets the overweight samurai Yajirobe, who takes Goku to Korin after being defeated by King Piccolo and receives healing and a power boost. Meanwhile, King Piccolo kills both Master Roshi and Chiaotzu, and uses the Dragon Balls to give himself eternal youth before destroying Shenron, which results in the Dragon Balls' destruction. As King Piccolo prepares to destroy West City as a show of force, Tien Shinhan arrives to confront him, but is defeated and nearly killed by one of Piccolo's spawns. Goku arrives in time to save Tien and then kills King Piccolo by blasting a hole through his chest with the Great Ape Fist.

=== Piccolo Junior Saga ===
Just before King Piccolo dies, he spawns his son, Piccolo Junior. Korin informs Goku that Kami, the creator of the Dragon Balls, might be able to restore Shenron and the Dragon Balls so that Goku can wish his fallen friends back to life, which he does. He also stays and trains under Kami for the next three years, now-adult Goku once again reuniting with his friends for the World Martial Arts Tournament, as well as a now-adult Chi-Chi and a revived cyborg Mercenary Tao. Piccolo Junior enters the tournament to avenge his father's death, leading to the final battle to death between him and Goku. After Goku narrowly wins and defeats Piccolo Junior, he leaves with Chi-Chi and they get married, leading to the events of Dragon Ball Z.

== Production ==
"Makafushigi Adventure!"
Sample of "Makafushigi Adventure!" performed by Hiroki Takahashi, the opening theme song for the anime.

Kazuhiko Torishima, Toriyama's editor for Dr. Slump and the first half of Dragon Ball, said that because the Dr. Slump anime was not successful in his opinion, he and Shueisha were a lot more hands-on for the Dragon Ball anime. Before production even began, they created a huge "bible" for the series detailing even merchandise. He himself studied the best way to present anime and its business side, discussing it with the Shogakukan team for Doraemon.

Toriyama had some involvement in the production of the anime. When it began he did mention to the staff that they seemed to be making it too colorful by forcing the color palette of Dr. Slump on it. He also listened to the voice actors' audition tapes before choosing Masako Nozawa to play Goku. He would go on to state that he would hear Nozawa's voice in his head when writing the manga. Toriyama specified Kuririn's voice actress be Mayumi Tanaka after hearing her work as the main character Giovanni in Night on the Galactic Railroad. Tōru Furuya remarked that there were not many auditions for the characters because the cast was made up of veteran voice actors. Performing the roles was not without its difficulties, Toshio Furukawa, the voice of Piccolo, said it was difficult to constantly perform with a low voice because his normal lighter voice would break through if he broke concentration.

Shunsuke Kikuchi composed the score for Dragon Ball. The opening theme song for all of the episodes is "Makafushigi Adventure!" (魔訶不思議アドベンチャー！, Makafushigi Adobenchā!; "Mystical Adventure!") performed by Hiroki Takahashi in Japanese and Jimi Tunnell in English. The ending theme is "Romantic Ageru yo" (ロマンティックあげるよ, Romantikku Ageru yo; "I'll Give You Romance") performed by Ushio Hashimoto in Japanese and Daphne Gere in English.

Feeling that the Dragon Ball anime's ratings were gradually declining because it had the same producer that worked on Dr. Slump, who had a "cute and funny" image connected to Toriyama's work and was missing the more serious tone, Torishima asked the studio to change the producer. Impressed with their work on Saint Seiya, he asked its director Kōzō Morishita and writer Takao Koyama to help "reboot" Dragon Ball; which coincided with the beginning of Dragon Ball Z.

=== English localization and broadcasting ===
In 1989 and 1990, Harmony Gold USA licensed the series for an English-language release in North America. In the voice dubbing of the series, Harmony Gold renamed almost all of the characters, including the protagonist Goku, who was renamed "Zero." This dub consisting of 5 episodes and one movie (an 80-minute feature featuring footage of movies 1 and 3 edited together) was cancelled shortly after being test marketed in several US cities and was never broadcast to the general public, thus earning the fan-coined term "The Lost Dub."

A subtitled Japanese version of the series was first broadcast in the United States by the Hawaii-based Nippon Golden Network. The series aired in a 6AM slot on Tuesdays from 1992 to 1994, before the network moved on to Dragon Ball Z.

In 1995, Funimation Productions (later known as Crunchyroll, LLC, which was founded a year earlier in California) acquired the license for the distribution of Dragon Ball in the United States as one of its first imports. Licensing director Bob Brennan firmly believed he had found the Japanese equivalent of Mickey Mouse but had trouble convincing Americans of this. They contracted Josanne B. Lovick Productions and voice actors from Ocean Productions to create an English version for the anime and first movie in Vancouver, British Columbia. The dubbed episodes were edited for content, and contained different music. Thirteen episodes aired in first-run syndication during the fall of 1995 before Funimation canceled the project due to low ratings and moved on to Dragon Ball Z.

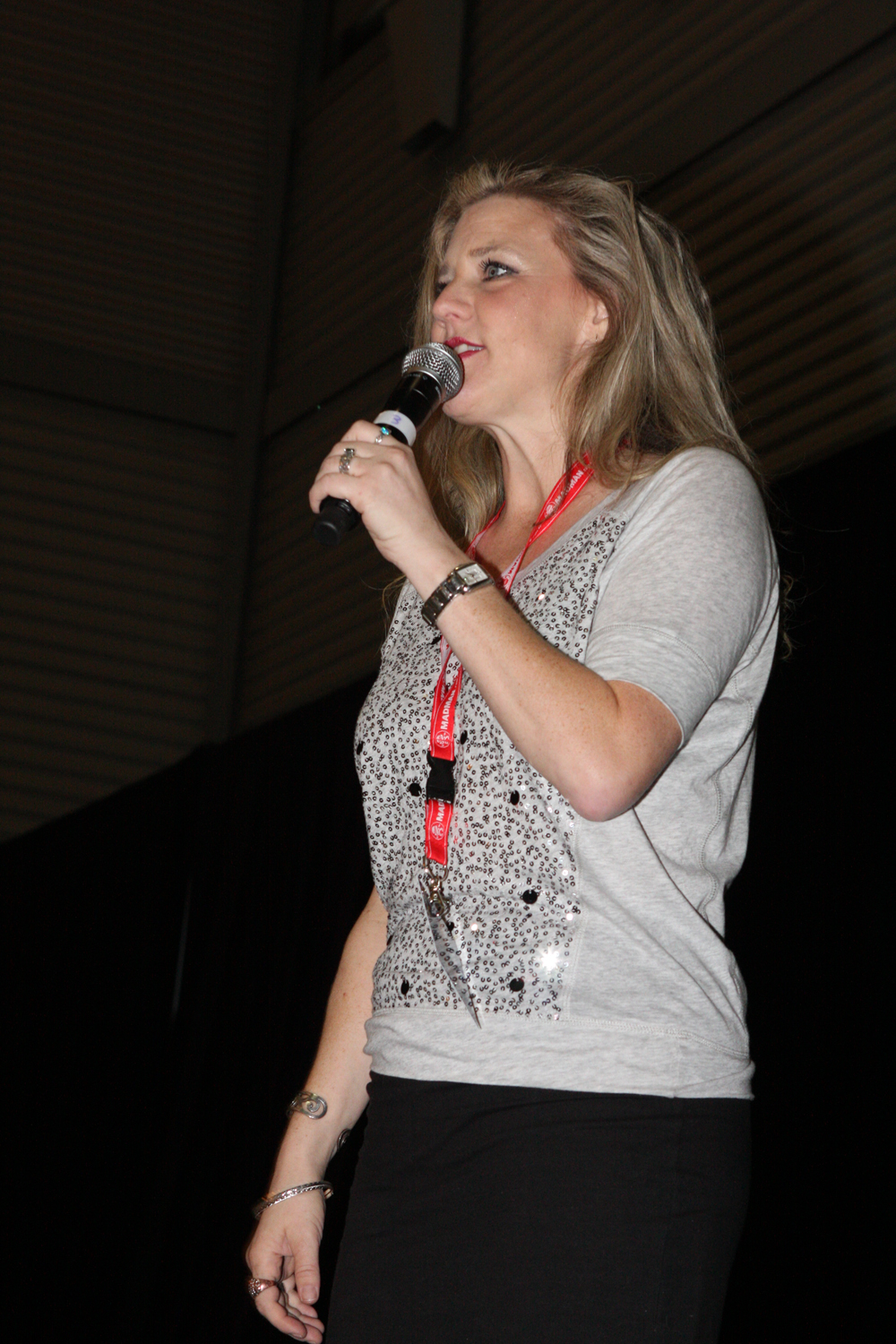
Stephanie Nadolny voiced young Goku for Funimation's dub of Dragon Ball, having previously voiced young Gohan in Dragon Ball Z.

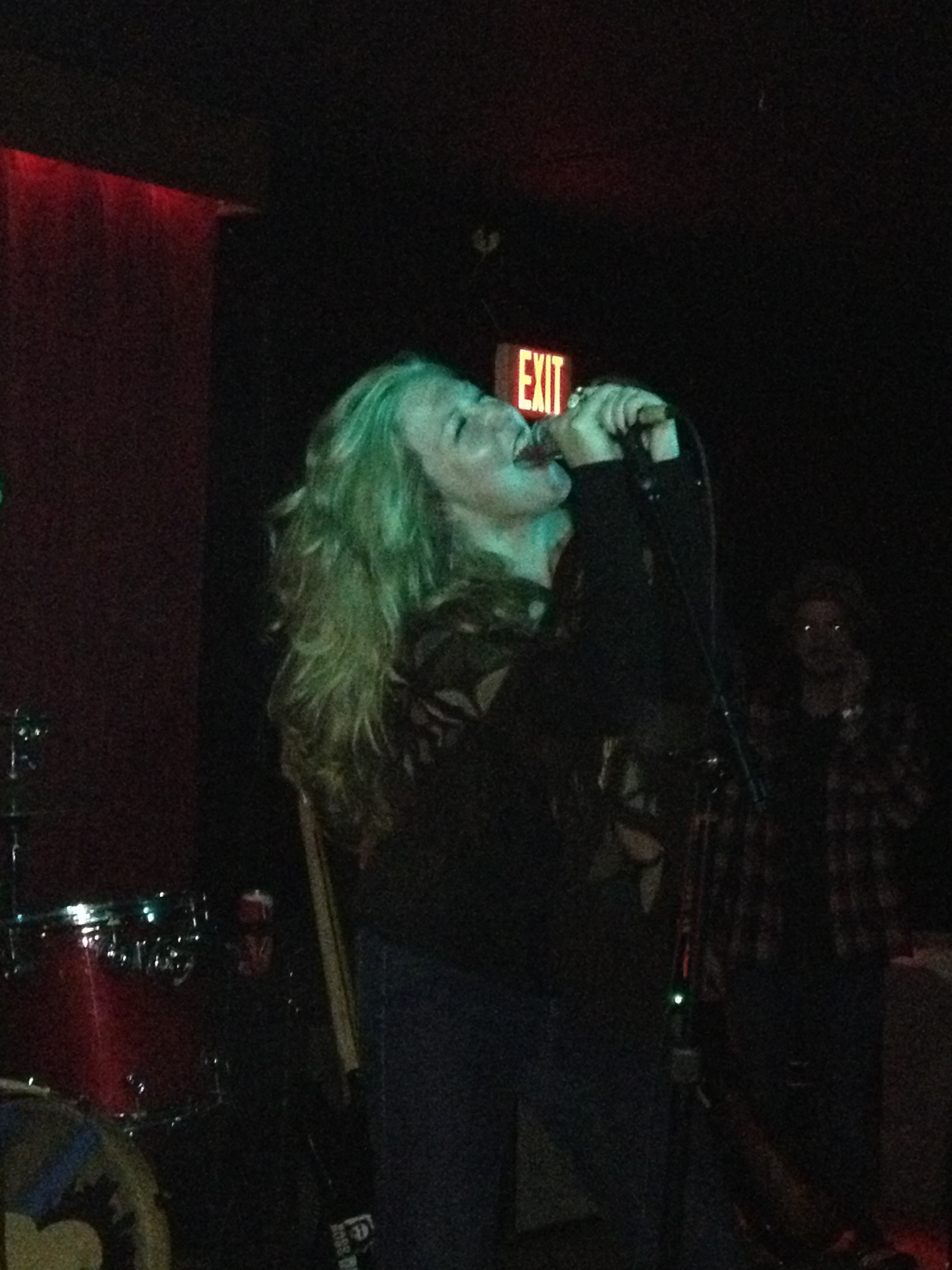
Tiffany Vollmer voiced Bulma for Funimation's dub of Dragon Ball, having previously voiced the character in Dragon Ball Z.

In March 2001, due to the success of their dub of Dragon Ball Z, Funimation announced the return of the original Dragon Ball series to American television, featuring a new English version produced in-house with slightly less editing for broadcast (though the episodes remained uncut for home video releases), and they notably left the original background music intact. The re-dubbed episodes aired on Cartoon Network from August 20, 2001, to December 1, 2003. Funimation also broadcast the series on Colours TV and their own Funimation Channel starting in 2006. This English dub was also broadcast in Australia and New Zealand. In Canada and Europe, an alternative dubbed version was produced by AB Groupe (in association with Blue Water Studios) and was aired in those territories instead of the Funimation version.

==== Content edits ====
The US version of Dragon Ball aired on Cartoon Network with numerous digital cosmetic and dialogue changes, which were done to remove sexually suggestive content as well as nudity and blood. Some scenes were deleted altogether, either to save time or remove strong violence. References to alcohol and drugs were removed, for example, when Jackie Chun (Master Roshi) uses Drunken Fist Kung Fu in the 21st Tenkaichi Budokai, Funimation called it the "Mad Cow Attack." A sexually suggestive scene where Goku exclaims, "No balls!", was deleted from Episode 2.

Changes also led to confusing context and the content of the scenes; such as when Bulma helps Goku take a bath. In the Japanese version, the two characters do not cover their privates because Goku is innocent of the differences in gender and Bulma believes Goku to be a little boy. While bathing, Bulma asks Goku his age and only when Goku claims to be fourteen (he later finds out he is younger after learning how to count properly) does Bulma throw things at Goku before kicking him out of the bath. In the BLT and Funimation versions, the dialogue was changed; with Goku remarking that Bulma did not have a tail and it must be inconvenient for her when bathing.

== Other media ==
=== Home media release ===
In Japan, Dragon Ball did not receive a proper home video release until July 7, 2004, fifteen years after its broadcast. Pony Canyon announced a remastering of the series in a single 26-disc DVD box set, that was made-to-order only, referred to as a "Dragon Box". Since then, Pony Canyon content of this set began being released on mass-produced individual 6-episode DVDs on April 4, 2007, and finished with the 26th volume on December 5, 2007.

==== Original releases ====
Funimation's logo for the English distribution of the anime

Dragon Ball's initial VHS release for North America was never completed. Funimation released their initial dub, the edited and censored first thirteen episodes, on six tapes from September 24, 1996, to February 28, 1998, together with Trimark Pictures. These episodes and the first movie were later released in a VHS or DVD box set on October 24, 2000. Funimation began releasing their in-house dub beginning with episode 14 by themselves on December 5, 2001, in both edited and uncut formats, only to cease VHS releases two years later on June 1, 2003, in favor for the DVD box sets. Including the initial 1996–1998 releases with Trimark, 86 episodes of Dragon Ball across 28 volumes were produced on VHS for North America.

Funimation released their own in-house dub to ten two-disc DVD box sets between January 28 and August 19, 2003. Each box set, spanning an entire "saga" of the series, included the English and Japanese audio tracks with optional English subtitles, and uncut video and audio. However, they were unable to release the first thirteen episodes at the time, due to Lions Gate Entertainment holding the home video rights to their previous dub of the same episodes, having acquired them from Trimark after the company became defunct. After Lions Gate Family Entertainment's license and home video distribution rights to the first thirteen episodes expired in 2009, Funimation has released and remastered the complete Dragon Ball series to DVD in five individual uncut season box sets, with the first set released on September 15, 2009, and the final on July 27, 2010.

Funimation's English dub of Dragon Ball has been distributed in other countries by third parties. Madman Entertainment released the first thirteen episodes of Dragon Ball and the first movie uncut in Australasia in a DVD set on March 10, 2004. They produced two box sets containing the entire series in 2006 and 2007. Manga Entertainment began releasing Funimation's five remastered sets in the United Kingdom in 2014.

Dragon Ball: Yo! Son Goku and His Friends Return!! (ドラゴンボール オッス！帰ってきた孫悟空と仲間たち！！ Doragon Bōru: Ossu! Kaette Kita Son Gokū to Nakama-tachi!!) is the second Dragon Ball Z OVA and features the first Dragon Ball animation in nearly a decade, following a short story arc in the remade Dr. Slump anime series featuring Goku and the Red Ribbon Army in 1999. The film premiered in Japan on September 21, 2008, at the Jump Super Anime Tour in honor of Weekly Shōnen Jump's fortieth anniversary. Yo! Son Goku and His Friends Return!! is also in the extra DVD included in the Dragon Ball Z: Battle of Gods limited edition, which was released on September 13, 2013.

=== Films ===
During the anime's broadcast, three theatrical animated Dragon Ball films were produced. The first was Curse of the Blood Rubies in 1986, followed by Sleeping Princess in Devil's Castle in 1987, and Mystical Adventure in 1988. In 1996 The Path to Power was produced in order to commemorate the anime's tenth anniversary.

=== Video games ===
Several video games based on Dragon Ball have been created, beginning with Dragon Daihikyō in 1986. Shenlong no Nazo, produced that same year, was the first to be released outside Japan. 1988's North American version was titled Dragon Power and was heavily Americanized with all references to Dragon Ball removed; characters' names and appearances were changed. Additional games based on the series include Advanced Adventure, Dragon Ball: Origins, its sequel, and Revenge of King Piccolo.

=== Soundtracks ===
Dragon Ball has been host to several soundtrack releases, the first being Dragon Ball: Music Collection in 1986. Dragon Ball: Saikyō e no Michi Original Soundtrack is composed entirely of music from the tenth anniversary film. In 1995 Dragon Ball: Original USA TV Soundtrack Recording was released featuring the music from the Funimation/Ocean American broadcast.

== Reception ==
The show's initial U.S. broadcast run in 1995 met with mediocre ratings.

In 2000, satellite TV channel Animax together with Brutus, a men's lifestyle magazine, and Tsutaya, Japan's largest video rental chain, conducted a poll among 200,000 fans on the top anime series, with Dragon Ball coming in fourth. In 2001, the staff of Animage listed the series as the fifty-second most important anime of all time. TV Asahi conducted two polls in 2005 on the Top 100 Anime, Dragon Ball came in second in the nationwide survey conducted among multiple age-groups and third in the online poll. On several occasions the Dragon Ball anime has topped Japan's DVD sales.

Otaku USA's Joseph Luster called Dragon Ball "one of the most memorable animated action/comedy series of all time." He cited the comedy as a key component to the show, noting that this might surprise those only familiar with Z. Todd Douglass of DVD Talk referred to it as "a classic among classics [that] stands as a genre defining kind of show." and wrote that "It's iconic in so many ways and should be standard watching for otaku in order to appreciate the genius of Akira Toriyama." He had strong praise for the "deep, insightful, and well-developed" characters, writing "Few shows can claim to have a cast quite like Dragon Ball's, and that's a testament to the creative genius of Toriyama."

T.H.E.M. Anime Reviews' Tim Jones gave the show four out of five stars, referring to it as a forerunner to modern fighting anime and still one of the best. He also stated that it has much more character development than its successors Dragon Ball Z and Dragon Ball GT. Carl Kimlinger of Anime News Network summed up Dragon Ball as "an action-packed tale told with rare humor and something even rarer—a genuine sense of adventure." Kimlinger and Theron Martin, also of Anime News Network, noted Funimation's reputation for drastic alterations of the script, but praised the dub.

The Encyclopedia of Science Fiction described Dragon Ball as an energetic and influential anime whose generally routine plots and action sequences are enlivened by considerable verve, occasional character development and amusing dialogue. It highlighted the series' uneven tone, noting that although its storytelling, animation and characterization are largely aimed at children, it also features a surprisingly high death toll and frequent juvenile sexual humor, including nudity and fan service. The encyclopedia praised the show's humor, particularly scenes involving Emperor Pilaf, while criticizing some of its sexualized depictions of young characters. It also emphasized the series' enduring popularity and influence, identifying its recurring motif of former enemies becoming friends as an important influence on Steven Universe and comparing the young Goku to the protagonist of OK K.O.! Let's Be Heroes.

The positive impact of Dragon Ball's characters has manifested itself in the personal messages Masako Nozawa sent to children as taped messages in the voice of Goku. Nozawa takes pride in her role and sends words of encouragement that have resulted in children in comas responding to the voice of the characters.
