= Hiromi Tsuru =

Japanese actress (1960–2017)

- 鶴 ひろみ
- Born: Hiromi Tsuru (靏ひろみ); March 29, 1960; Chitose, Hokkaido, Japan
- Died: November 16, 2017 (aged 57); Yokohama, Japan
- Other names: Tsuru-chan (鶴ちゃん); Tsuruchi (つるち)
- Occupations: Actress; voice actress; narrator
- Years active: 1968–2017
- Agent: Aoni Production
- Notable work: Dragon Ball as Bulma; Ghost Sweeper Mikami as Reiko Mikami; Trigun as Meryl Stryfe; Let's Go! Anpanman as Dokin-chan; Kimagure Orange Road as Madoka Ayukawa; Ranma ½ as Ukyo Kuonji
- Spouse: Keiichi Nanba (m. 1986; div. 1990)

Hiromi Tsuru (鶴 ひろみ, Tsuru Hiromi; March 29, 1960 – November 16, 2017) was a Japanese actress and narrator. During her life, she was attached to the Himawari Theatre Group as a child and then to Aoni Production at the time of her death. She was most well known for voicing the character of Bulma in the Dragon Ball franchise for over 31 years.

She was also known for her voice roles as Ukyo Kuonji in Ranma ½, Dokin-chan in Let's Go! Anpanman, Madoka Ayukawa in Kimagure Orange Road, Miyuki Kashima in Miyuki, Reiko Mikami in Ghost Sweeper Mikami, Meryl Strife in Trigun, Naomi Hunter in the Metal Gear series, Oyone-baasan in Chibi Maruko-chan, and Asuna Kujo in Maison Ikkoku.

== Biography ==
Tsuru was born in Chitose, Hokkaido on March 29, 1960. In the second grade of elementary school, she joined the Himawari Theatre Group with her sister. In 1968, she auditioned for Princess Comet (TBS) and made her drama debut in episode 63 "Yokai no Mori". In 1969, Tsuru also appeared in the fourth episode "Masked Cemetery" of Horror Theater Unbalance (Fuji TV) under the direction of Eizo Yamagiwa and with the same script by Shinichi Ichikawa.

After that, she appeared on the cover of learning magazines, fashion shows for children's clothing, and television dramas such as Aya no Onna (Fuji TV). Tsuru also lent her voice to Jodie Foster in the American film Bugsy Malone aired on Sunday Western Painting Theater (TV Asahi).

=== Career ===
After making her debut as an actress, Tsuru graduated from Tsurumi High School in Kanagawa Prefecture. In 1978, when she was a junior in high school, she auditioned for the World Masterpiece Theater series The Story of Perrine and made her voice acting debut in the role of the main character, Perrine Paindavoine. After the airing of The Story of Perrine, she hadn't been a voice actor for two years, but in 1981 she was in charge of the cat role in Ohayō! Spank.

In 1982, after auditioning for the role of Revi in Arcadia of My Youth: Endless Orbit SSX, she transferred from the Sunaoka office to Aoni Production in order to work on her voice in earnest. Since then, Tsuru was active as a voice actress.

Starting in the 1990s, Tsuru started to work mainly as a narrator for variety shows and newscasts, occasionally appearing on stage. She worked as a narrator up until shortly before her death.

=== Death ===
On November 16, 2017, at around 7:30 PM, Tsuru was found unconscious in her car on the Inner Circular Route near Nihonbashi in Tokyo. The car was stopped, the hazard lights were on, and Tsuru was still wearing her seatbelt. She was transported to a hospital, where she died in Yokohama aged 57. There were no external wounds and no sign of an accident. Police believed it was highly likely she died from an illness. Her agency later confirmed that she died from aortic dissection.

=== Tributes and memorial service ===
Floral altar display at the memorial service of Tsuru held in the Aoyama Funeral Hall.

The news of Tsuru's death created widespread grief amongst the anime industry, with many voice actor colleagues and anime staff members expressing grief and shock at the sudden news of her death online.

Aya Hirano, who had worked with Tsuru on Anpanman as the voice of Dokin-chan's little sister Kokin-chan, paid tribute, "Ten years as sisters. I will never forget" and "I cannot believe that I can no longer meet my beloved big sister Dokin. This year marks 10 years since I first appeared in Anpanman. Dokin-chan was my absolute favorite Anpanman character when I was a child, and at first, I truly couldn't believe that I got to become her little sister."

A memorial service for Tsuru was held on January 13, 2018, at the Aoyama Funeral Hall in Tokyo, with Kōichi Yamadera, Keiko Toda, Hiroshi Masuoka, Ryūsei Nakao, Miina Tominaga, Tarako, Tōru Furuya, Mayumi Tanaka, Ryō Horikawa, and Masako Nozawa being amongst those in attendance. Nozawa, Toda, Nakao, and Naoko Watanabe served as some of the service's organizers. Over 400 mourners attended to the service in order to pay respects, with a picture of Tsuru set amongst over 4,000 flowers, seven Dragon Ball balloons, and the iconic characters she portrayed. The ending song of the original Dragon Ball series, "Romantic Ageru Yo", was played in the background.

Nozawa expressed her feelings and spoke on behalf of those who were in attendance, saying, "If you gather the seven Dragon Balls they're said to be able to grant you any wish, right? But not this time. I'm sorry." She finished with, "I still don't know what happened, and I want to ask what's wrong. But, true to Hiromi, you went off to a mysterious world we cannot reach, without causing trouble for anyone. However, there might be friends waiting for you over there. It's something I truly don't want to say, but Hiromi, please watch over our world. Goodbye."

Nakao also expressed his emotions, "Since we've been partners for about 30 years, it feels like my right arm has been ripped off", continuing with, "Everyone is really upset that she passed away so suddenly", with Yamadera telling reporters at the service, "Even with this farewell gathering, I'm still filled with a feeling that I just can't believe it. I know I have to send them off properly, but right now, I'm just not quite ready to feel that way..."

At the 12th Seiyu Awards, instead of the Special Merit Award, Tsuru, alongside other voice actors who died the previous year, were commemorated.

== Filmography ==
=== Television animation ===
1970s

- The Story of Perrine (1978) (Perrine Paindavoine) (debut)

1980s

- Ohayō! Spank (1981) (Cat)
- Space Cobra (1982) (Sierra)
- Little Pollon (1982) (Selene, Goddess)
- Arcadia of My Youth: Endless Orbit SSX (1982) (Revi)
- The Kabocha Wine (1982) (Kanzaki, Yōko)
- Warrior of Love Rainbowman (1982) (Yōko Ohmiya)
- The Super Dimension Fortress Macross (1982) (Kim Kabirov)
- Kinnikuman (1983) (Natsuko Shōno, Girl A, Terryman (young) (Episode 11))
- Lightspeed Electroid Albegas (1983) (Hotaru Mizuki)
- Miyuki (1983) (Miyuki Kashima)
- Stop!! Hibari-kun! (1983) (Rie Kawai)
- Nine (1984) (Yoko Takagi)
- Galactic Patrol Lensman (1984) (Zelda)
- Star Musketeer Bismark (1984) (Chyntia)
- Fist of the North Star (1985) (Kanna, Ami)
- Touch (1985) (Sachiko Nishio)
- Cat's Eye (1985) (Cathy, Akiko)
- Bosco Adventure (1986) (Unicorn)
- Dragon Ball (1986) (Bulma and Child Piccolo Jr.)
- Hikari no Densetsu (1986) (Miyako Kamijou)
- Maison Ikkoku (1986) (Asuna Kujou)
- Saint Seiya (1986) (Chameleon June, Mermaid Thetis)
- Esper Mami (1987) (Taeko Kuroyuki)
- Hiatari Ryōkō! (1987) (Keiko Seki)
- Tsuide ni Tonchinkan (1987) (Naoko Ibaraki)
- Kimagure Orange Road (1987) (Madoka Ayukawa)
- Let's Go! Anpanman (1988) (Dokin-chan) (first voice)
- City Hunter 2 (1988) (Katharine)
- Dragon Ball Z (1989) (Bulma, Baby Trunks, Bra and West Kaiō-shin)
- Ranma ½ Nettōhen (1989) (Ukyo Kuonji and Kaori Daikoku)

1990s

- Magical Taruruto-kun (1990) (Mari Oaya)
- Tsuyoshi Shikkari Shinasai (1992) (Keiko Igawa)
- Ghost Sweeper Mikami (1993) (Reiko Mikami)
- Dragon Ball GT (1996) (Bulma, Bra, Bulma's Descendant)
- Cyber Team in Akihabara (1998) (Hinako Hanakoganei, Petit Angel)
- Silent Möbius (1998) (Kiddy Phenil)
- Trigun (1998) (Meryl Stryfe)
- Kamikaze Kaito Jeanne (1999) (Joan of Arc)
- Monster Rancher (1999) (Undine)

2000s

- Gravitation (2000) (Mika Seguchi)
- Love Hina (2000) (Mrs. Maehara)
- Detective Conan (2000) (Kuniko Yamamoto)
- Samurai Girl: Real Bout High School (2001) (Madoka Mitsurugi)
- Great Dangaioh (2001) (Mrs. Midorikawa)
- Vampiyan Kids (2001) (Mama)
- Dragon Drive (2002) (Hideaki)
- Samurai Champloo (2004) (Shino/Kohaku)
- Yu-Gi-Oh! GX (2007) (Yubel's female voice)
- Porphy no Nagai Tabi (2008) (Isabella)
- One Piece (2009) (Shakuyaku)
- Dragon Ball Kai (2009) (Bulma, Baby Trunks, Bra and West Kaiō-shin)

2010s

- Blue Exorcist (2011) (Michelle)
- Chibi Maruko-chan (2011) (Oyone (Second))
- Saint Seiya Omega (2013) (Pallas)
- Dragon Ball Super (2015) (Bulma, Tights, Bra)

=== Original video animation (OVA) ===
- Leda: The Fantastic Adventure of Yohko (1985) (Yohko Asagiri)
- Gall Force (Movies and OVA's 1986–1997) (Lufy)
- Prefectural Earth Defense Force (1986) (Baradaki)
- Wounded Man (1986-1988) (Natsuko Komiya)
- Hana no Asuka-gumi! (1987-1990) (Asuka Kuraku)
- Demon City Shinjuku (1988) (Sayaka)
- Dominion (1988-1989) (Leona Ozaki)
- One Pound Gospel (1988) (Sister Angela)
- Blood Reign: Curse of the Yoma (1989) (Aya 1)
- Blue Sonnet (1989-1990) (Sonnet Barje)
- Kimagure Orange Road (1989-1991) (Madoka Ayukawa)
- Cleopatra DC (1989) (Suen)
- Devil Hunter Yohko (1990-1995) (Sayoko Mano)
- Here is Greenwood (1990-1993) (Nagisa Tezuka)
- Ranma ½ series (1993-2008) (Ukyo Kuonji)
- Shonan Junai Gumi (1994) (Ayumi Murakoshi)
- Golden Boy (1995) (Madame President)
- Gravitation (1999) (Mika Seguchi)

=== Movies ===
- Arcadia of My Youth (1982) (Mira)
- Penguin`s Memory: Shiawase Monogatari (1985) (Jill)
- Dragon Ball: Curse of the Blood Rubies (1986) (Bulma)
- Dragon Ball: Sleeping Princess in Devil's Castle (1987) (Bulma)
- Kimagure Orange Road (1988) (Madoka Ayukawa)
- Hiatari Ryōkō! Ka - su - mi: Yume no Naka ni Kimi ga Ita (1988) (Keiko Seki)
- Dragon Ball: Mystical Adventure (1988) (Bulma)
- Ultraman: The Adventure Begins (1989) (Beth O'Brien/Ultrawoman Beth)
- Dragon Ball Z: Dead Zone (1989) (Bulma)
- Dragon Ball Z: The World's Strongest (1990) (Bulma)
- Dragon Ball Z: The Tree of Might (1990) (Bulma)
- Dragon Ball Z: Lord Slug (1991) (Bulma)
- Dragon Ball Z: Broly – The Legendary Super Saiyan (1993) (Bulma, Baby Trunks)
- Dragon Ball Z: Bojack Unbound (1993) (Bulma, Baby Trunks)
- Slam Dunk: Conquer the Nation, Hanamichi Sakuragi! (1994) (Sanea Nakagawa)
- Street Fighter II: The Animated Movie (1994) (Eliza Masters)
- Ghost Sweeper Mikami: Gokuraku Daisakusen (1994) (Reiko Mikami)
- Dragon Ball Z: Fusion Reborn (1995) (Bulma)
- Dragon Ball Z: Wrath of the Dragon (1995) (Bulma)
- Dragon Ball: The Path to Power (1996) (Bulma)
- Trigun: Badlands Rumble (2010) (Meryl Stryfe)
- Yu-Gi-Oh! Bonds Beyond Time (2010) (Yubel)
- Dragon Ball Z: Battle of Gods (2013) (Bulma)
- Dragon Ball Z: Resurrection 'F' (2015) (Bulma)

=== Video games ===
- Cobra series (1991-2014) (Utopia Moore)
- Cosmic Fantasy 2 (1991) (Rim Norlandia)
- Graduation series (1992-2006) (Kiyomi Arai)
- Ghost Sweeper Mikami: Joreishi wa Nice Body (1993) (Reiko Mikami)
- Ghost Sweeper Mikami (1994) (Reiko Mikami)
- Dear Langrisser II (1995) (General Imelda)
- Dragon Ball series (1994-2018) (Bulma)
- Dragoon Might (1995) (Tsugumi, Layla)
- Tekken 3 (1997) (Julia Chang)
- Ghost in the Shell (1997) (Motoko Kusanagi)
- Metal Gear Solid (1998) (Dr. Naomi Hunter)
- Tekken Tag Tournament (1999) (Julia Chang)
- Little Princess: Marl Ōkoku no Ningyō Hime 2 (1999) (Akujo)
- Dororo (2004) (Misaki)
- Shining Force EXA (2007) (Zhirra)
- The Legend of Heroes: Trails in the Sky the 3rd (2007) (Rufina Argent)
- Dragon Ball: Origins (2008) (Bulma)
- Metal Gear Solid 4: Guns of the Patriots (2008) (Dr. Naomi Hunter)
- Super Robot Wars Z 2008 (Supreme Commander Teral)
- Yakuza 0 (2015) (Reina)
- Bravely Second: End Layer (2015) (Anne)
- Drift Girls (2015) (Izumisawa Mai)
- Devil's Third (2015) (Jane Doe)

=== Tokusatsu ===
- Kamen Rider Agito Movie (2001) (Queen Ant Lord/Formica Regia)
- Engine Sentai Go-onger (2008) (Savage Water Barbaric Machine Beast Shower Banki (ep. 38))
- Kamen Rider OOO (2011) (Pteranodon Yammy <♀> (ep. 32) )

=== Drama CDs ===
- The Origin of Mewtwo (1998 (Radio broadcast), 1999 (CD release)) (Madame Boss)

=== Dubbing ===
==== Live-action ====
- Megan Follows
  - Anne of Green Gables (Anne Shirley)
  - Anne of Avonlea (Anne Shirley)
  - Anne of Green Gables: The Continuing Story (Anne Shirley Blythe)
- City Hunter (Saeko Nogami (Chingmy Yau))
- Footloose (Fuji TV edition) (Rusty (Sarah Jessica Parker))
- The Freshman (Tina Sabatini (Penelope Ann Miller))
- Full House (Carrie (Erika Eleniak))
- Heart of Dragon (1987 TBS edition) (Jenny (Emily Chu))
- Little House on the Prairie (Etta Plum (Leslie Landon))
- Some Kind of Wonderful (Watts (Mary Stuart Masterson))

==== Animation ====
- The Animatrix (Trinity)
