= Goku =

Fictional character and protagonist of the Dragon Ball series

Son Goku
- Dragon Ball character
- Goku, seen as both an adult and child, illustrated by Akira Toriyama
- First appearance: Dragon Ball chapter #1 Bulma and Son Goku, December 3, 1984 (Weekly Shōnen Jump 1984 #51)
- Created by: Akira Toriyama
- Based on: Sun Wukong (Monkey King) by Wu Cheng'en
- Voiced by (Japanese): Masako Nozawa
- Voiced by (English): Sean Schemmel (Funimation (Note: 1999–present)); Ceyli Delgadillo (Funimation; young (Note: DB films 2 and 3, DBZ ep. 128, one loop in ep. 202)); Stephanie Nadolny (Funimation; young (Note: 2001–2010, 2024–2025)); Colleen Clinkenbeard (Funimation; young (Note: 2010-present)); Kristen McGuire (Funimation; infant (Note: Kakarot DLC)); Other: Barbara Goodson (Note: Credited as Betty Gustafson) (Harmony Gold); Nesty Ramirez (Creative Products Corp.); Saffron Henderson (BLT (Note: DB eps. 1–13, DB film 1)); Ian James Corlett (Note: Credited as Jerry J. Todd) (Ocean (Note: DBZ eps. 1–50 [edited into eps. 1–37], DBZ film 3 TV version)); Peter Kelamis (Ocean (Note: DBZ eps. 50–67 [edited into eps. 38–53], 123-159, DBZ films 1-3)); Jillian Michaels (Ocean; young (Note: some appearances DBZ)); Kirby Morrow (Ocean (Note: DBZ eps. 160–291)); Zoe Slusar (Blue Water; young); Jeffrey Watson (Blue Water; teen (Note: Dragon Ball)); Jeremiah Yurk (Blue Water; adult and SSJ4 (Note: Dragon Ball GT)); Jodi Forrest (AB Groupe; young); David Gasman (AB Groupe); Ed Marcus (AB Groupe (Note: vocal effects in DBZ film 2)); Andrea Kwan (Animax Asia; young); David Bridges (Animax Asia; teen); Lex Lang (Bang Zoom! (Note: Dragon Ball Super)); Philece Sampler (Note: Credited as Dana Hayes) (Bang Zoom!; young (Note: Dragon Ball Super))
- Portrayed by: Justin Chatwin (Dragonball Evolution); Other: Heo Sung-tae (Fight Son Goku, Win Son Goku); Charles Chen (The Magic Begins)

In-universe information
- Alias: Kakarot (Note: Kakarrot in Viz translations) (birth name)
- Species: Saiyan
- Occupation: Martial artist Radish farmer

Son Goku (Note: English: /ˈɡoʊ.kuː, ɡoʊˈkuː/; Son Gokū (孫悟空; [soŋɡokɯː])) is a fictional character and the main protagonist of the Dragon Ball manga series created by Akira Toriyama. He is based on Sun Wukong (known as Son Gokū in Japan and the Monkey King in the West), a main character of the classic 16th-century Chinese novel Journey to the West, combined with influences from the Hong Kong action cinema of Jackie Chan and Bruce Lee. Goku made his debut in the first Dragon Ball chapter, Bulma and Son Goku, (Note: Buruma to Son Gokū (ブルマと孫悟空)) (Note: Was renamed to "Bloomers and the Monkey King" in Viz's translation.) originally published in Japan's Weekly Shōnen Jump magazine on December 3, 1984.

Goku is introduced as an eccentric, monkey-tailed boy who practices martial arts and possesses superhuman strength. He meets Bulma and joins her on a journey to find the seven wish-granting Dragon Balls. Along the way, he finds new friends who follow him on his journey to become stronger. As Goku grows up, he becomes the Earth's mightiest warrior and battles a wide variety of villains with the help of his friends and family, while also gaining new allies in the process. Born under the name Kakarot, (Note: Kakarotto (カカロット)) (Note: An English to Japanese play on the word "carrot".) as a member of the Saiyan race on Planet Vegeta, he is sent to Earth as an infant prior to his homeworld's destruction at the hands of Frieza. Upon his arrival on Earth, the infant is discovered by Son Gohan, who becomes the adoptive grandfather of the boy and gives him the name Goku. The boy is initially full of violence and aggression due to his Saiyan nature, until an accidental head injury turns him into a cheerful, carefree person. Grandpa Gohan's kindness and teachings help to further influence Goku, who later on names his first son Gohan in honor of him.

As the protagonist of Dragon Ball, Goku appears in most of the episodes, films, television specials and OVAs of the manga's anime adaptations (Dragon Ball, Dragon Ball Z) and sequels (Dragon Ball GT, Dragon Ball Super, Dragon Ball Daima), as well as many of the franchise's video games. Due to the series' international popularity, Goku became one of the most recognizable and iconic manga/anime characters worldwide. Outside the Dragon Ball franchise, Goku has made cameo appearances in Toriyama's self-parody series Neko Majin Z, has been the subject of other parodies, and has appeared in special events. Most Western audiences were introduced to the adult version of Goku featured in the Dragon Ball Z anime, which adapted the final 26 Dragon Ball manga volumes, as opposed to his initial appearance as a child due to the limited success of the first anime series overseas.

== Conception and creation ==
Goku, and Dragon Ball in general, evolved from one of Akira Toriyama's earlier one-shot series called Dragon Boy. In this story, the protagonist looks similar to Goku, but has a pair of dragon wings. The original inspiration were Hong Kong action cinema, including those by Bruce Lee such as Enter the Dragon (1973) and by Jackie Chan such as Drunken Master (1978); Toriyama said he had a young Chan in mind for a live-action Goku, stating that "nobody could play Goku but him." Goku uses a variety and hybrid of East Asian martial arts styles, including Karate and Wing Chun (Kung fu).

Bulma and Goku were the first pair of characters which were introduced in the manga and Toriyama stated that he subsequently introduced other characters in pairs because "that way, I'm able to explain the characters and their relationship to each other through their interactions. In my case, I feel that it isn't good to insert too much narration. I suppose Goku and Bulma are representative of that." He further added that "as a child, Goku doesn't know anything [of the world], so without Bulma, he'd be a character who didn't say anything." Toriyama mentioned his editor Kazuhiko Torishima wanted Goku to form a relationship with Bulma, but this was never applied to the series. With the conclusion of the Cell arc, Gohan was intended to replace his father as the protagonist, but Toriyama later decided that Gohan was unsuitable for the role. According to Toriyama, Goku is more of a selfish person than a hero as his main interest in the story is to fight strong opponents rather than protecting the innocent. As a result, Toriyama was angered when the anime adaptations of Dragon Ball started portraying Goku as more heroic than his manga counterpart. Toei kept portraying Goku as a more heroic figure, especially in the anime sequel Dragon Ball GT where he often rescues his granddaughter Pan as producer Kōzō Morishita was influenced by the 1997 film Titanic.

=== Design ===
The character Goku is based on Sun Wukong (Son Goku in Japanese), (Note: 孫悟空, reads as "Son Gokū" in Japanese, hence providing the origin of Goku's name.) the central character of the Chinese novel Journey to the West. To be creative with the idea of Sun Wukong, Toriyama designed Goku as a human boy with a monkey's tail, rather than a complete simian, because the tail would give the character a distinguishing feature. He later stated that the tail was a pain to draw, hence why he had it get cut off early on. Toriyama did not initially plan to make Goku an alien, it was not until the introduction of fighters from other planets that he established him as a Saiyan (Note: Saiya-jin (サイヤ人; lit. 'Saiya Person')) (Note: "Saiya", an anagram for Yasai (野菜; lit. vegetable).). Goku was given the ability to teleport to any planet in seconds, so that Toriyama could increase the pace of the story.

Wanting the series to have a Chinese appearance, Toriyama used the color of the robes worn by Buddhist monks for Goku's dōgi. During the early chapters of the manga, Toriyama's editor Torishima commented that Goku looked rather plain. Toriyama had given him simple clothes on purpose because it was a fighting manga, so to combat this he added several characters like Master Roshi and Krillin, and created the Tenkaichi Budōkai (Note: "Strongest Under the Heavens Martial Arts Tournament" (天下一武道会)) (Note: Renamed to "The World Martial Arts Tournament" in Funimation's dub.) to focus the storyline on fighting. To defy the assumption that Goku would win the tournaments, Toriyama made him lose the first and second but win the third.

Toriyama's editor was initially against having Goku grow up, saying it was uncommon to have the protagonist drastically change in manga, however, he gave in when Toriyama threatened that he would not be able to continue the series if the character did not. Toriyama later stated he had him grow up as a means to make drawing the fight scenes easier.

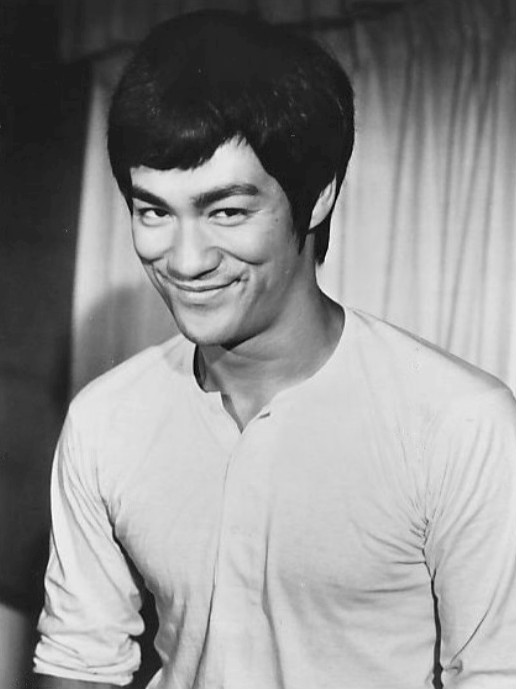
Jackie Chan and Bruce Lee (pictured) were major influences on Goku's character.

When Toriyama thought up the Super Saiyan (Note: Sūpā Saiya-jin (超(スーパー)サイヤ人; lit. 'Super Saiya Person')) concept during the Frieza arc, he felt the only way to show Goku's massive power-up was to have him transform. Initially he was concerned that the facial expression looked like that of a villain, but felt it was acceptable since the transformation was brought about by anger. The Super Saiyan form spared the trouble of coloring Goku's hair all the time for the standard black-and-white manga pages. This was the reason for the Super Saiyan form having blonde hair, because it was easier to draw for Toriyama's assistant who spent a lot of time blacking in Goku's hair. Goku's piercing eyes in Super Saiyan form were inspired by Bruce Lee's paralyzing glare. For the Dragon Ball Z anime adaptation, character designer Tadayoshi Yamamuro used Lee as a reference, stating that, when he "first becomes a Super Saiyan, his slanting pose with that scowling look in his eyes is all Bruce Lee."

Dragon Ball GT chief character designer Katsuyoshi Nakatsuru said he agonized over designing Goku's Super Saiyan 4 appearance, which was the idea of the show's producers, questioning whether it was necessary to go further with the transformations. Because Super Saiyan 4 is brought about while in a Saiyan's Ōzaru (Note: "Great Ape" (大猿)) form, he made the hair more "wild" and covered Goku's body in red fur. There was only a single final draft of the character, although Nakatsuru did consider making the hair blonde, he ended up choosing black as it provides more contrast with the red fur.

During the plans of the final story arc of Dragon Ball Super, it was decided that Goku should have another transformation: The Ultra Instinct. The concept was that the Ultra Instinct would be completely different from Goku's previous Super Saiyan transformations.

=== Voice actors ===
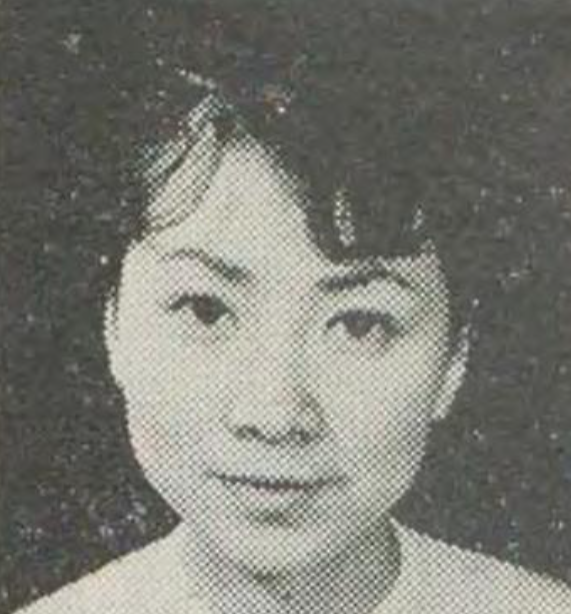
Masako Nozawa has been Goku's Japanese voice actress in every single piece of Dragon Ball media.

In the Japanese version of every Dragon Ball anime series and subsequent related media, Goku has been voiced by Masako Nozawa. Toriyama selected Nozawa upon hearing her audition sample, remarking that only Goku could sound like that. Nozawa stated that she was ecstatic when she got the role because she had always wanted to be in one of Toriyama's works. She said she had to be mindful of the fact that Goku grew up in the mountains and did not know much of the world. Despite having to voice Goku, Gohan, Goten and Bardock, Nozawa says she is able to instantly get into the respective character upon seeing their image.

Nozawa explained that she did not read the manga so that she would not know what was coming in the story until recording, making her reactions the same as Goku's. Nozawa said that she liked young Goku with his tail because he was cute, and stated that the character was still the same even at the end of the series.

In the numerous English versions, Goku has been played by different actors because different companies produced the dubs, by reason of changes of automated dialogue replacement companies and recording studios, or due to actors quitting:

- In Harmony Gold's very brief dub of the original Dragon Ball series, along with the movies Curse of the Blood Rubies and Mystical Adventure, Goku (Note: In this dub Goku was renamed "Zero".) was voiced by Barbara Goodson.
- In Funimation's initial dub of the anime, Goku was voiced by Saffron Henderson in the first 13 episodes of the original Dragon Ball series (produced in association with BLT Productions) and the movie Curse of the Blood Rubies, and by Ian James Corlett and Peter Kelamis in the first 67 episodes of Dragon Ball Z (edited into 53 episodes, produced in association with Saban and Ocean Productions) and the movies Dead Zone, The World's Strongest, and The Tree of Might.
- In Funimation's in-house dub, Goku as an adult has been consistently voiced by Sean Schemmel throughout the entire Dragon Ball franchise, while Kid Goku was voiced by Ceyli Delgadillo in the movies Sleeping Princess in Devil's Castle and Mystical Adventure, by Stephanie Nadolny in the original Dragon Ball series, Dragon Ball GT, Dragon Ball Daima, the movie The Path to Power, and various video games, and by Colleen Clinkenbeard in Dragon Ball Z Kai, Dragon Ball Super, the movies Curse of the Blood Rubies, Broly, and Super Hero, and various video games.
- In AB Groupe's dub of the anime produced for Canadian and European broadcast (initially also in association with Ocean Productions and later with Blue Water Studios), Goku was voiced by Peter Kelamis again and later by Kirby Morrow in episodes 123–291 of Dragon Ball Z, by Zoe Slusar as a child in both Dragon Ball and Dragon Ball GT, by Jeffrey Watson as an older teen in Dragon Ball, and by Jeremiah Yurk as an adult and Super Saiyan 4 in GT.
- In Bang Zoom's dub of the first 27 episodes of Dragon Ball Super produced for Toonami Asia's broadcast, Goku was voiced by Lex Lang as an adult and Philece Sampler as a child.

=== Kamehameha ===
Akira Toriyama experimented with a number of poses when he was alone in order to decide the best pose for the Kamehameha. After much contemplation, he could not decide on a name for his "Kame" attack, so he asked his wife (Nachi Mikami), who came up with the name. She told Akira that it would be easy to remember the name of the attack if he used the name of the historical Hawaiian king, Kamehameha (lit. "the very lonely one" or "the one set apart" in Hawaiian language).

== Appearances ==
=== In Dragon Ball ===
The cover of Weekly Shōnen Jump No. 51, 1984 featuring Goku and Bulma in their first appearances

Goku first appears in Dragon Ball as a monkey-tailed child adopted by the hermit martial artist Gohan. Before the series' narrative begins, he accidentally and unknowingly kills Gohan when he temporarily transforms into the mighty Ōzaru after staring at a full moon. Goku loses the ability when his friends cut off his tail.

Living alone with an item known as a Dragon Ball which he keeps as a memento of Gohan, Goku befriends a teenage girl named Bulma. He joins her to find the seven Dragon Balls, which, when gathered, summon the wish-granting dragon Shenron. They encounter the desert bandit Yamcha and two shapeshifters named Oolong and Puar, who join their quest. Goku is later trained by the martial artist Master Roshi, alongside a monk named Krillin, who later becomes his best friend. It is Roshi who gives Goku the magic cloud Kinto'un (Note: "Somersault Cloud" (筋斗雲)) (Note: Renamed to "Flying Nimbus" in Funimation's dub.), as a reward for saving his pet sea turtle, which becomes Goku's primary source of flight travel across the world.

Goku's first shown martial arts attack as a child is Jan ken (Note: "Jan Fist" (ジャン拳)), three physical blows modeled after the hand signs in rock-paper-scissors. As a child, he wields the Nyoi-bō (Note: "Mind Stick" (如意棒)) (Note: Renamed to "Power Pole" in Funimation's dub.), a magic staff that extends and retracts on command, given to him by his grandfather.

Goku's signature attack is the Kamehameha (named after King Kamehameha I of Hawai'i), which he learned from Roshi. The Kamehameha is a concentration of energy, released as a concussive beam. Roshi spent about 50 years developing and perfecting the technique, but, as a child, Goku is able to understand and copy the technique immediately after only one demonstration. After training with the Earth's Guardian, Kami, Goku learns to fly by virtue of the technique Bukū-jutsu (Note: "Air Dance Technique" (舞空術)) and uses the Nimbus cloud less frequently for flight travel.

While participating in the World Martial Arts Tournament that attracts the most powerful fighters in the world, Goku battles foes, later turned allies, such as Tien Shinhan and Chiaotzu, as well as the Namekian Piccolo. After becoming the runner-up champion of the 21st and 22nd tournaments, Goku wins in the 23rd with Piccolo's defeat, and marries Chi-Chi soon after to fulfill a promise he made to her years ago despite not knowing what marriage was.

From left to right: Goku in his base, Super Saiyan, Super Saiyan 2, and Super Saiyan 3 forms

Five years later, Goku meets his evil older brother Raditz and learns about his heritage. Goku comes from a race of nearly extinct extraterrestrials called Saiyans, himself having been sent from their home planet to prepare Earth for sale on the intergalactic market by destroying all its life (at least according to Raditz, who was absent at the time of his planet's destruction, when Goku was sent to Earth as an infant by Bardock and Gine to protect their son from Frieza). While Grandpa Gohan was taking care of him, Goku accidentally fell into a deep ravine and suffered a severe head injury, which caused him to forget his mission and drastically altered his personality.

After Raditz kidnaps Goku's son Gohan, he forms a truce with Piccolo in order to defeat Raditz. After sacrificing his life during the battle, Goku trains with King Kai in the Other World. He teaches Goku the Kaiō-ken (Note: "World King Fist" (界王拳)), which multiplies his energy and strength but with possible strain to the body. It is from King Kai that Goku learns his most powerful attack: the Genki-Dama (Note: "Energy Sphere" (元気玉)) (Note: Renamed to "Spirit Bomb" in Funimation's dub.), an energy sphere created by gathering energy from surrounding animals, nature and humans.

After being revived by the Dragon Balls, Goku faces off with the Saiyan prince Vegeta, who eventually becomes his greatest rival and another ally. On his journey to Planet Namek in order to aid his friends in gathering the Namekian Dragon Balls to revive those killed by the Saiyans, Goku fights the galactic tyrant Frieza, who destroyed the Saiyans' home planet and nearly the entire race. During his epic battle with Frieza, Goku becomes the first Saiyan in a thousand years to transform into a fabled Super Saiyan.

After defeating Frieza and escaping the destruction of Namek, Goku learns a teleportation skill called Shunkan Idō (Note: "Instantaneous Movement" (瞬間移動)) (Note: Renamed to "Instant Transmission" in Funimation's dub.), taught by the inhabitants of the planet Yardrat. Goku contracts a heart virus whereof the time-traveler Trunks warns him, but recovers after taking medicine provided by Trunks. Goku trains Gohan to be his successor and sacrifices himself again during the battle against the evil bio-android Cell. Goku is temporarily resurrected on Earth seven years later and meets his second son Goten.

Goku battles Vegeta again after Vegeta willingly falls under the control of the wizard Babidi in order to gain power. Shortly after, he is drawn into a battle for the universe against the monster Majin Buu. Despite having mastered two new Super Saiyan transformations, Goku prepares Goten and Trunks to take his place as Earth's defender. After his life is fully restored, Goku attempts to fuse with Gohan in order to defeat Buu, but this fails when the latter is temporarily absorbed by Buu and so he persuades the newly arrived Vegeta to fuse with him, creating Vegito. (Note: Bejitto (ベジット)) (Note: "Vegerot" in Viz Media's manga translation.) Later when the Fusion technique is abandoned on both sides, Goku destroys Buu with a Spirit Bomb attack. Ten years later, during another World Martial Arts Tournament, Goku meets Uub, Buu's human reincarnation, and leaves with him, intending to train him as the new protector of Earth.

=== In Dragon Ball Super ===
After defeating Majin Buu, Goku meets a new opponent known as Beerus, the God of Destruction in the film Battle of Gods. An alternative, more innately powerful form known as the Super Saiyan God (Note: Sūpā Saiya-jin Goddo (超(スーパー)サイヤ人ゴッド)) is reached by Goku during this film. Though the temporary transformation wears off, Goku manages to harness its godly powers. In its sequel film Resurrection 'F', Goku manages to achieve a blue-haired evolution of Super Saiyan God under Whis's tutelage, known as the Super Saiyan God Super Saiyan (Note: Sūpā Saiya-jin Goddo Sūpā Saiya-jin (超(スーパー)サイヤ人ゴッドSS(スーパーサイヤ人))), or "Super Saiyan Blue" for short, which Goku uses to battle the newly revived Frieza. These forms appear in Dragon Ball Super and its manga tie-in, which expand upon the stories from the two films.

Afterwards, Goku and his friends participate in a fighting tournament set between Beerus and his brother Champa, who is Universe 6's God of Destruction, facing the best warriors from Champa's universe. During this tournament, Goku reveals that he has learned to combine the perfect energy control of his Super Saiyan Blue form with his older technique, the Kaiō-ken. After meeting with the omnipotent being known as Grand Zeno, Goku encounters an evil alternate version of himself called "Goku Black", who is terrorizing Future Trunks' timeline. Black is eventually revealed to be a rogue Supreme Kai in training named Zamasu, who has stolen Goku's body from yet another alternate timeline and teamed up with the Zamasu of Future Trunks' timeline to fulfill their "Zero Mortals Plan". After Zamasu and Black become even more dangerous by undergoing Potara Fusion during the battle in Future Trunks' timeline, Goku ultimately summons the future version of Grand Zeno who erases Zamasu.

Goku causes the Zenos to decide to hold a multi-universal martial arts tournament with the losing universes wiped from existence; the Tournament of Power (Note: 力ちからの大会たいかい (Chikara no Taikai)). Throughout the tournament, Goku faces multiple opponents but finds his toughest in Jiren. It is during his fights with Jiren that Goku acquires a temporary transformed state using a divine technique known as Migatte no Goku'i. (Note: "Secret of the Self-Centered" (身勝手みがっての極意ごくい)) (Note: referred to as "Ultra Instinct" in most English media) Ultimately, Goku and Frieza manage to work together to force Jiren out of bounds in a triple elimination, leaving Android 17 as the winner who uses his wish on the Super Dragon Balls to restore the erased universes.

Goku's origin story from the Dragon Ball Minus manga chapter is retold in the film Dragon Ball Super: Broly. His birth parents are Bardock, a low-class Saiyan mercenary, and Gine, the owner of a butcher shop. Bardock has a strong suspicion that Frieza is up to something when he receives an order on his scouter for all Saiyans to return home, so he convinces Gine to send their infant son in a space pod to Earth. In the present, following the events of the Tournament of Power, Goku and Vegeta encounter another Saiyan survivor named Broly, whom Frieza has recruited to defeat them. When Broly proves to be too powerful for either of them to handle individually, Goku and Vegeta use the Metamoran Fusion Dance, which creates Gogeta. (Note: Gojīta (ゴジータ)) Gogeta almost defeats his opponent, but Broly's allies teleport him back to the barren planet he grew up on. Goku teleports to this planet as well to provide Broly and his two friends with survival supplies, hoping to be able to spar with Broly again someday.

In the manga, directly after the final scene of Broly, Goku and Vegeta meet Galactic Patrol by Jaco and a mysteriously highly skilled agent named Merus in order to help stop an ancient warlock called Moro. With Moro headed to New Namek to use the Namekian Dragon Balls, the two Saiyans travel to the planet to stop him, where they are defeated by him using his magic to drain their life essences until near death. Once recovered, they attempt to go after Moro again, but he escapes from them, Merus and (the also conscripted) Majin Buu with the help of his accomplice Cranberry (who he kills) in order to wish upon the Dragon Balls to free all the Galactic Prison prisoners. After a few days, Goku hears from Merus that Moro has grown even stronger and is unstoppable. This leads to Goku asking Merus to help train him to master the Ultra Instinct technique so he can defeat Moro. Goku helps his friends take out Moro's forces before he comes face-to-face with Moro again. When Moro fuses with Seven-Three, he and his allies are soundly defeated and mortally wounded. Goku achieves the full power of "Ultra Instinct" once more, which he uses to debilitate Moro to near-death. Even after healing him with a Senzu bean, he is unfazed by his ensuing sneak attack, unsuccessfully attempting to convince him to reconsider his ways and go back to prison, and him using a stray severed arm with Merus's copied power to obtain Ultra Instinct for himself, Goku continuously outmatches Moro. Ultimately, with the help of his friends and family, along with key assistance from Buu/Grand Supreme Kai and Uub unknowingly contributing divine power, Goku manages to finish off Moro and save the Earth once more. He, Vegeta, Buu and Jaco then reunite with a now-mortal Merus to be honoured as heroes by the Galactic Patrol.

Much later, Goku and Vegeta are contacted by a group of beings called the Heeters, on a seemingly imperative mission to defeat a surviving member of the now-extinct sharpshooting Cerealean race; Granolah. Blinded by his desire for revenge, Granolah confronts Goku and defeats him, as Goku's Ultra Instinct turns out to be taxing to his body and loses its accuracy as he keeps fighting. The fight is later revealed to be a ruse by the Heeters to eliminate Granolah and the Saiyans from the Heeters' plot to assassinate Frieza and achieve universal conquest. He is later rescued by the last Namekian on the planet Cereal, Monaito, who hides them in his home after a disastrous battle with the Heeter warrior Gas, who wishes absolute power using the planet's Dragon Balls. Monaito reveals the identity of his father, Bardock, and the story of his actions in keeping him and the young Granolah safe from the Heeters a long time ago. Moved by the story, Goku and Vegeta finally find resolve about the meaning of the Saiyan race's pride, and later confront Gas for a second round. Goku stalls him by teleporting across random locations within the cosmos via Shunkan Idō with Gas tailing him, in an effort to give Granolah time to regain his power. Remembering Whis' advice about finding one's true and personal Ultra Instinct, Goku later molds his own version of the technique, using his emotions as freely as he pleases. Despite this, he and Vegeta are ultimately bested, even after Granolah inflicted his deadliest sniping shot towards the villain with Goku's assistance, but are saved by Frieza's unexpected arrival. Frieza kills Gas and Elec, the Heeter leader and mastermind of the coup, in swift succession, before unveiling a new transformation and demonstrating his new powers by knocking Goku and Vegeta out of their empowered forms in one quick strike. He spares the duo before making his leave.

In the film Dragon Ball Super: Super Hero, Goku does not play the role of protagonist, as he and Vegeta train on Beerus' domain, accompanied by newcomer Broly, and his companions from the previous film. He spars with Vegeta without any transformations or ki techniques except for flight. Back on Earth, Piccolo is forced to deal with the reinvigorated Red Ribbon Army with Gohan as his only best defense for Earth against the army's threat, as Bulma is unable to contact Goku and Vegeta because Beerus' ice cream container accidentally obstructed Whis' angelic staff. In the post-credits scene, tired and exhausted, Goku falls down from Vegeta's weak last punch, admitting defeat as his rival celebrates his triumph. In the manga's aftermath of the film, Goku teleports Gohan, Goten, and Trunks to Beerus' planet in order to test out Gohan's new Beast transformation. This results in an epic battle royale between Goku, Gohan, Goten, Trunks, Vegeta, and Broly.

=== In other media ===
In the anime-only sequel series Dragon Ball GT, Goku is transformed back into a child by an accidental wish made by his old enemy Pilaf using the Black Star Dragon Balls while Pilaf was about to wish to take over the world. Goku, Trunks and his own granddaughter Pan travel the universe to search for the Black Star Dragon Balls and return them to Earth to prevent its destruction. After acquiring the Super Saiyan 4 transformation, Goku battles the evil Tuffle Baby, Super Android 17, and the evil Shadow Dragons. His final challenge is against Omega Shenron, whom he destroys using the Super Ultra Spirit Bomb. Goku leaves with the original form of Shenron, but not before saying his goodbyes to his friends on Earth. He appears 100 years later at the next World Martial Arts Tournament as an adult, where he watches a battle between Goku Jr., his descendant, and Vegeta Jr., Vegeta's descendant. An elderly Pan sees him, but he quickly departs.

In the latest anime-only sequel series Dragon Ball Daima, Goku is again transformed back into a child, along with the rest of his friends and family, by a wish to the Earth's Dragon Balls made by King Gomah of the Demon Realm. Goku later travels to the Demon Realm with the Supreme Kai and the Majin known as Glorio, later joined by Princess Panzy of the Third Demon World as well as Piccolo, Vegeta, and Bulma. During the final battle against Gomah, Goku unlocks an alternate version of the Super Saiyan 4 transformation, while Glorio uses the Demon Realm Dragon Balls to restore Goku and his allies back to their normal sizes.

Goku has appeared in various other media including an unofficial Taiwanese live-action film and an unofficial Korean live-action film. He was portrayed by Justin Chatwin in the 2009 20th Century Fox feature Dragonball Evolution. Goku has appeared in almost every Dragon Ball licensed video game, including crossover games such as Jump Super Stars, Jump Ultimate Stars and Battle Stadium D.O.N. In 1992, Goku was featured in the interactive game Dragon Ball Z: Get Together! Goku World, in which Goku and his gang travel back in time to review events in the Dragon Ball timeline and interacts with his younger self. In December 2007, Goku made a guest appearance in avatar form in the MMORPG Second Life for a Jump Festa promotion titled Jumpland@Second Life. Goku appears in the Dr. Slump and Arale-chan video game for the Nintendo DS.

Goku has been the subject of, and is mentioned in, various songs. "Son Goku Song" and "Gokū no Gokigen Jānī" feature Goku as a child singing about himself. During his adult years, the song "Aitsu wa Son Gokū" by Hironobu Kageyama, where Kageyama praises everything about Goku, and the duet "Ore-tachi no Energy" feature words spoken by the character. For the release of the single of the Dragonball Evolution international theme song "Rule", Toriyama supplied CD artwork of singer Ayumi Hamasaki dressed as Goku.

Goku has been used in Japanese public service announcements aimed at children. In June 1988, Goku and other Dragon Ball characters were featured in two PSA short films. The first, in which Goku is taught the importance of obeying traffic safety by others, is entitled Goku's Traffic Safety (Note: Gokū no Kōtsū Anzen (悟空の交通安全)). The second is called Goku's Fire Fighting Regiment (Note: Gokū no Shōbō-tai (悟空の消防隊)), in which he teaches two children the importance of fire safety.

Goku has made guest appearances in various Japanese television shows and manga. In 2005, Goku appeared in the Toriyama parody manga Neko Majin Z where he is the sensei of the main character Z. On September 15, 2006, in celebration of the 30th anniversary of Kochira Katsushika-ku Kameari Kōen-mae Hashutsujo, the special manga Super Kochikame (Note: Chō Kochikame (超こち亀)) was released. The chapter entitled This is the Police Station in front of Dragon Park on Planet Namek (Note: Kochira Namekku-sei Doragon Kōen-mae Hashutsujo (こちらナメック星ドラゴン公園前派出所)) has Ryotsu Kankichi travel to planet Namek and try to issue Freeza a citation and scold both he and Goku for parking their ships illegally.

Goku and other Dragon Ball characters joined the cast of One Piece in the 2006 crossover manga Cross Epoch. He appears in a single panel of Toriyama's 2013 manga Jaco the Galactic Patrolman, which is set before the events of Dragon Ball. The collected tankōbon volume of Jaco features the bonus story Dragon Ball Minus: The Departure of the Fated Child, depicting how and why Goku's parents sent him to Earth.

Goku has been the subject of various parodies. In the episode "Career Day" of Takeshi's Castle, known in the United States as MXC, the hosts Beat Takeshi and Sonomanma Higashi dressed as popular anime characters, one as Goku as a child, the other as Doraemon. Weekly Shōnen Jump's Gag Special 2005 issue, released on November 12, 2004, featured a Bobobo-bo Bo-bobo one-shot Dragon Ball parody manga, a retelling of the first fight between Goku and Vegeta. In chapter #179 of the Yakitate!! Japan manga, Kawachi executes a Genki-Dama parody called a Shinrai-Dama (Note: lit. "Trust Ball" (信頼玉)) on the character Katsuo. In the manga and anime series Blood Lad, the character Staz performs the gestures for Goku's Kamehameha, having learned it from his favorite manga superhero, but it has no actual effect.

Goku regularly appears on Fuji TV. In 2003, Goku appeared in the interactive feature Orb's Panic Adventure! (Note: Kyūtai Panikku Adobenchā! (球体パニックアドベンチャー!)), which was featured at the Fuji TV headquarters in the orb section. In this, Freeza attacks a visiting tourist, blasting the orb section free from the rest of the Fuji TV building. Goku fights Freeza over the real life aqua city of Odaiba. In 2004, a sequel called Orb's Panic Adventure Returns! (Note: Kyūtai Panikku Adobenchā Ritānzu! (球体パニックアドベンチャーリターンズ!)) was produced. On March 25, 2006, Goku and Freeza appeared in an original animated short film in the IQ Mirror Mistake 7 (Note: Aikyū Mirā Machigai Nana (IQミラーまちがい7)) segment of the Japanese game show IQ Supplement (Note: IQ Sapuri (IQサプリ)).

On April 7, 2007, Goku and Fuji TV announcer Masaharu Miyake were commentators on the anime segment in the Japan Great Man Awards (Note: Nippon Ijin Taishō (日本偉人大賞)) titled Who is the Strongest Hero? (Note: Saikyō no Ijin ha Dare? (最強の偉人は誰？)). The segment featured a special tournament to decide who was the greatest person in Japanese history. During the intermission, Goku promoted the coming release of R2 Dragon Ball DVDs.

Since the U.S. debut of Dragon Ball Z in 1996, Goku has appeared in American pop culture. He was featured in an issue of Wizard magazine in which he and Superman fought a hypothetical battle and won. In the Codename: Kids Next Door episode "Operation: R.E.P.O.R.T", Numbuh Four's version of the story is a parody of the Goku and Freeza's battle in Dragon Ball Z. Goku appears in Robot Chicken in a sketch entitled A Very Dragon Ball Z Christmas, where Goku and Gohan fight an evil Mrs. Claus with Santa's reindeer, in an attempt to save Christmas.

The Saturday Night Live sketch TV Funhouse titled Kobayashi depicts real-life hot-dog-eating champion Takeru Kobayashi as able to transform into a Super Saiyan as he prepares to eat hot dogs; Goku appears briefly near the end. Goku is referenced in the songs "Goku" and "Anime" by Soulja Boy, where he brags that he looks and feels like Goku.

Goku appears in a parody of the film Moneyball on an episode of Mad entitled Money Ball Z, in which Billy Beane drafts Goku and a couple of other Dragon Ball characters into the Oakland A's. In 2013, he and Superman fought in a "Death Battle" episode of the Rooster Teeth web series ScrewAttack and lost. The episode "Goku vs. Superman" in the web series Epic Rap Battles of History won a Streamy Award for Best Music Video.

The use of the Kamehameha attack became an Internet meme which started with Japanese schoolgirls photographing themselves apparently using, and being affected by, this attack. It has attracted considerable media attention in France, Germany, as well as in many Spanish-speaking countries in South America.

== Cultural impact ==
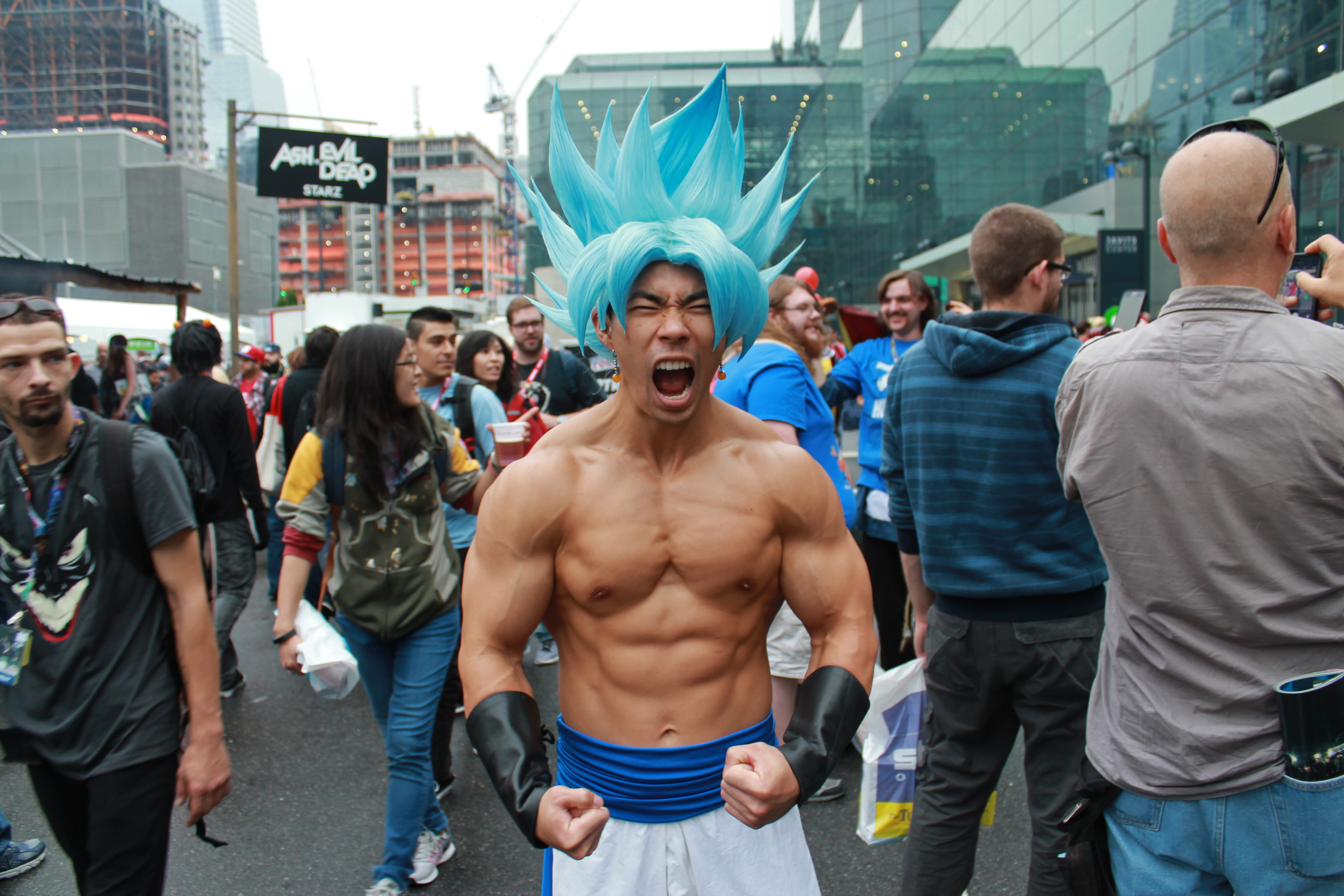
A cosplayer re-creating the appearance of Goku in Super Saiyan Blue form

A number of notable public figures have commented on their feelings towards Goku or his status in popular culture. For example, Jackie Chan has gone on record stating that Goku is his favorite Dragon Ball character. The German rock band Son Goku takes their name from the Dragon Ball protagonist. The band's lead singer Thomas D chose the name because Goku embodies the band's philosophy, saying he was "fascinated by Goku's naïveté and cheerfulness, yet, at the same time, a great warrior saving the world."

In 2010, a fiberglass statue of Goku was created by Canadian-born Hong Kong artist Edison Chen, with Chen's facial features instead of Goku's, as part of Chen's collection that was displayed at the "Treacherous Treis" exhibition in Singapore's Museum of Art and Design. CNN released an article explaining how Goku was Spanish professional tennis player Rafael Nadal's childhood inspiration, and called Nadal "the Dragon Ball of tennis" due to his unorthodox style "from another planet."

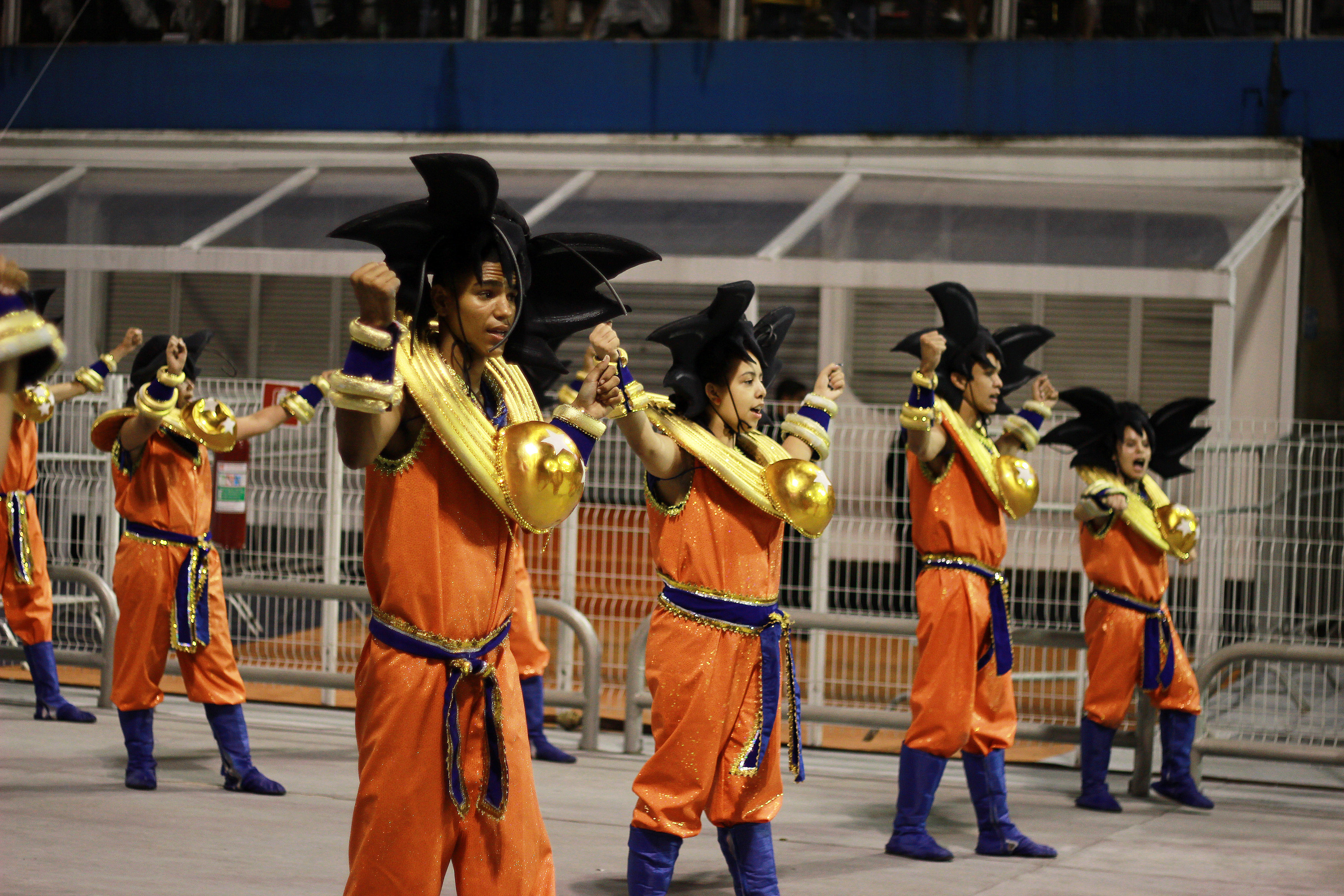
Parade revelers dressed as Goku at the 2013 Brazilian Carnival

One Piece creator Eiichiro Oda and Naruto creator Masashi Kishimoto said that Goku inspired their protagonists as well as series structure, with Tekken's Lars Alexandersson showing traits of a hero through his design inspired by Goku alongside Marvel Comic's Thor. Commenting on Goku's popularity, Kishimoto stated that when people hear the name "Son Goku", no longer do they think of the Journey to the West character, but instead Dragon Ball's protagonist comes to mind. Additionally, for the second half of the series, Kishimoto created an ape named Son Goku in reference to Toriyama's character to the point the ape has four tails just like the four-star Dragon Ball Goku earned from his grandfather.

In his book about Akira Toriyama published in 2004, Julius Weideman said Goku's journey and ever-growing strength resulted in the character winning "the admiration of young boys everywhere." Jason Thompson stated that unlike the "manly" heroes of other popular shōnen manga of the late 1980s and early 1990s, such as City Hunter and Fist of the North Star, Toriyama made his protagonist (Goku) cartoonish and small, thus starting a trend that Thompson says continues to this day. In 2015, the Japan Anniversary Association officially declared May 9 as "Goku Day". (Note: Gokū no hi (悟空の日; lit. 'Goku's Day')) (Note: In Japanese the numbers 5 and 9 can be pronounced as "Go" and "Ku" respectively.) Goku is the first manga character to have a balloon at the Macy's Thanksgiving Day Parade, with his first appearance at the 2018 parade.

=== Merchandise ===
Several pieces of merchandising based on Goku have been released, including action figures, plushes, and keychains.

=== Reception ===
Goku has appeared in several "top" character lists. He was ranked number one in IGN's 2009 list of Top 25 Anime Characters of All Time and reappeared on the same list in 2014, however, on this occasion they ranked him third, with Cowboy Bebop's Spike Spiegel and Neon Genesis Evangelion's Shinji Ikari placed above him, saying that "He was, in many ways, a character that bucked the trends of his time and defined the direction of shonen manga/anime for decades." In Mania Entertainment's 10 Most Iconic Anime Heroes, Thomas Zoth commented that "Goku and Dragon Ball completely revolutionized shōnen manga."

In a Newtype poll from March 2010, Goku was voted the fifth most popular male character from the 1980s. Goku ranked consistently high in the Anime Grand Prix poll in the category of "best male character" in the late 1980s and early 1990s, appearing seventeenth in the 1987 poll, fifteenth in the 1988 poll, second in the 1989 poll, fourth in the 1990 poll, third in the 1991 poll, fourth in the 1992 poll, thirteenth in 1993 poll, and twelfth in 1994 poll.

In a 1993 character popularity poll for the series, Weekly Shōnen Jump readers voted Goku second, after his son Gohan. He came in first in the magazine's 1995 poll, as well as in a 2004 poll amongst fans of the series for the book Dragon Ball Forever. In a 2005 The Daily Reader article entitled "The Greatest Geek Movie Heroes of All Time", Goku is the only animated character listed, and is ranked tenth. In a survey of 1,000 people, conducted by Oricon in 2007, Goku ranked first place as the "Strongest Manga character of all time."

In the survey "Friendship" developed by rankingjapan.com, in which people chose which anime character they would like as a friend, Goku ranked fifth. In 2000, Goku placed third in an Animax poll of favorite anime characters. In 2011, readers of Guinness World Records Gamer's Edition voted Goku as the 41st-top video game character of all time. NTT customers voted him as their third favorite black haired male anime character in a 2014 poll.

Game designer Hiroshi Matsuyama from CyberConnect2 said that while Goku is an appealing character readers could root for during the manga, he was hard to relate and, thus, instead preferred other characters like Krillin or Bulma. However, during the manga's final story arc, Matsuyama recalls being overjoyed when Goku says that Mr. Satan, a comic relief character with no superextraordinary skills, was the real hero of mankind as the Earthlings found him as the saviour of mankind when Buu was about win the final fight.

Goku's characterization has been well received by publications for manga, anime and other media. Anime News Network noted Goku as a good source of comedy and remarked that after everything he experiences, he still remains a naïve character. Tim Jones from THEM Anime Reviews noted that Goku is not an omnipotent character in the first anime series, unlike Dragon Ball Z, and does not disappear for long periods of time between sagas. Jones also liked the way the series' depict his entire adventures, making him a good main character. Voice actor Mamoru Miyano said that Goku's first Super Saiyan transformation in the manga was his favorite part from the series as Goku not only changed visually but his personality changes into a "classic, prototypical hero".

Rationalmagic.com praised Goku's innocence as one of the funniest parts of the series. In January 2017, Nozawa won two Guinness World Records for her longevity as Goku; she has been the sole voice actor for the role for over 23 years. According to Screen Rant, Goku's origin story has some similarities to that of Superman. On the other hand, Collider was more critical to Goku's actions in the series most notably when Gohan becomes an active character who goes through several character's arcs yet he is constantly overshadowed by his father to the point Akira Toriyama refrained from turning Gohan into his successor following the Cell Games and Goku once again took over Gohan's role in the final arc of Dragon Ball Z.

Despite his predominantly positive reception, Goku has received some negative feedback, in particular for his characterization in Dragon Ball Super due to how his constant desires for fighting stronger enemies resulted in setting up a story where all universes could be destroyed. While Anime Now's Richard Eisenbeis believes Goku is determined to protect his universe, the fact that he does not seemingly care about other loser universes being destroyed has been criticized.

Monique Jones from Syfy panned the character's relationship dynamic with his wife, as well as his perceived incompetency and irresponsibility as a father, drawing attention to the "tons of memes and fan chatter about Piccolo actually being the best dad Gohan's ever had". Sam Leach from Anime News Network agreed that fans of the series tend to joke about Piccolo being a better paternal figure to Gohan than his actual father, Goku, and felt that Dragon Ball Super emphasized this more when Piccolo started training him again.

The same site also criticized Goku often being busy in the narrative, most notably in Frieza's resurrection, as the supporting characters have some extra scenes only to have their spotlight stolen by Goku and Vegeta. His rematch with Frieza was criticized for how overpowered the character has become and how much back up his allies can provide in the battle, ruining the tension the film was supposed to generate. Despite enjoying his rematch with Frieza, DVD Talk expressed similar responses in the handling of these characters.

IGN noted that Goku has a tendency to show enemies mercy, including Vegeta, Piccolo, Cell and Moro. His decision to let Cell have a senzu bean without informing his allies in particular was considered to be infamous, which affected Gohan's confidence and led to his defeat. La Tercera went to call Goku irresponsible and immature to the character for helping Moro as a result of this show of mercy and the consequences. Both Goku and Vegeta were criticized for being too overpowered in Super to the point they steal the series' spotlight to the supporting cast while their strategies either lack complexity or create a plothole such as the time limit to the fusion Vegito.

== See also ==
- List of Dragon Ball characters
- Manga
