= Dragon Ball: Sleeping Princess in Devil's Castle =

- Theatrical release poster
- Kana: ドラゴンボール 魔神城のねむり姫
- Revised Hepburn: Doragon Bōru Majin-jō no nemuri hime
- Directed by: Daisuke Nishio
- Screenplay by: Keiji Terui
- Based on: Dragon Ball by Akira Toriyama
- Starring: see below
- Narrated by: Jōji Yanami
- Cinematography: Motoaki Ikegami
- Edited by: Shinichi Fukumitsu
- Music by: Shunsuke Kikuchi
- Production company: Toei Animation
- Distributed by: Toei Company
- Release date: July 18, 1987 (Japan)
- Running time: 45 minutes
- Country: Japan
- Box office: ¥1.45 billion (est.)

Dragon Ball: Sleeping Princess in Devil's Castle (Japanese: ドラゴンボール 魔神城のねむり姫, Hepburn: Doragon Bōru Majin-jō no Nemuri Hime) is a 1987 Japanese animated fantasy martial arts adventure film and the second anime feature film based on the Dragon Ball manga by Akira Toriyama. It was originally released in Japan on July 18 at the "Toei Manga Matsuri" film festival as part of a quadruple feature along with the first Saint Seiya film and the film versions of Hikari Sentai Maskman and Choujinki Metalder. An English dub by Funimation was released in 1998. It was preceded by Dragon Ball: Curse of the Blood Rubies and followed by Dragon Ball: Mystical Adventure.

== Plot ==
According to legend, the Sleeping Princess lies within the confines of a castle in a mountain range known as the Devil's Hand. In the present day, Goku arrives at Kame House to train with Master Roshi and learn more martial arts skills. A young monk, Krillin, arrives on the island in a rowboat, and bribes Roshi with adult magazines to train him. Roshi sends Goku and Krillin on a quest to retrieve the Sleeping Princess, and plans to train whomever brings her back. Meanwhile, Launch, a thief, plans to retrieve the Sleeping Princess as well.

After learning of Goku's whereabouts from Roshi, Bulma, Oolong, Yamcha, and Puar fly in Bulma's Capsule jet to the Devil's Hand. During their flight, ogres attack the jet, causing it to crash. Bulma is taken to the castle, where she meets Lucifer, a vampire-like count, and his butler Igor. Lucifer presents Bulma at a ceremony, where he intends to have Igor drain her of her blood to awake the Sleeping Princess. Hearing Bulma's screams for help, Yamcha, Oolong and Puar go to the ceremony in disguise, and wait for an opportunity to rescue her.

While inside the castle, Goku and Krillin fight off various ogres and monsters. The pair face off against Ghastel, a giant devil, who is eaten by a swamp monster while attacking them. Goku and Krillin fall into a bedchamber, disrupting the ceremony, and discover the Sleeping Princess is a jewel. Launch arrives on her motorcycle and steals it. Oolong and Puar, who had disguised themselves by shape-shifting, accidentally expose their true forms, and are captured along with Yamcha. While shooting at the ogres, Launch sneezes and changes from an angry blonde-haired woman to a polite blue-haired woman. In the process, she forgets what she is doing. Goku recovers the Sleeping Princess, but Lucifer threatens to kill Krillin if Goku doesn't give it back. Goku is attacked by monsters after he gives the jewel back to Lucifer.

Later, Lucifer uses the light of the full moon to power up the Sleeping Princess. Outside the Devil's Hand, Goku and his friends are encased in a giant wall of rock. Goku looks at the moon and transforms into a Great Ape, smashing the wall. Goku goes on a rampage and attempts to devour Launch. Yamcha and Krillin grab ahold of Goku's tail, allowing Puar to transform into a pair of scissors and cut it off. Goku returns to normal and has no memory of the incident.

Lucifer inserts the Sleeping Princess into a laser cannon, planning to destroy the sun using the jewel's power. Goku and Krillin fight Lucifer, while Yamcha kills Igor and frees Bulma. Just as Lucifer activates the laser cannon, Goku uses the Kamehameha wave to damage it, causing the castle to collapse. While Goku and the others escape, Lucifer is killed by the falling cannon. The Sleeping Princess disappears and the Devil's Hand is half-destroyed.

Goku and Krillin bring Launch to Roshi, who believes her to be the Sleeping Princess. Roshi decides to take both Goku and Krillin as his students.

== Cast ==
Character name	Voice actor			
Character name	Japanese	English		
Character name	Japanese	Creative Products Corp. (c. 1996)	Funimation (1998)	Unknown/AB Groupe (c. 2003)
Goku	Masako Nozawa	Nesty Calvo Ramirez	Ceyli Delgadillo	Jodi Forrest
Kuririn	Mayumi Tanaka	Kririn	Krillin	Clearin
Kuririn	Mayumi Tanaka	Apollo Abraham	Laurie Steele	Sharon Mann
Lunch	Mami Koyama	Ethel Lizano (bad); Mitch Frankenberger Pellicer (good)	Launch	Jodi Forrest
Lunch	Mami Koyama	Ethel Lizano (bad); Mitch Frankenberger Pellicer (good)	Christine Marten (bad); Monika Antonelli (good)	Jodi Forrest
Yamcha	Tōru Furuya	Apollo Abraham	Christopher Sabat	Sharon Mann
Bulma	Hiromi Tsuru	Ethel Lizano	Leslie Alexander	Bloomer
Bulma	Hiromi Tsuru	Ethel Lizano	Leslie Alexander	Sharon Mann
Oolong	Naoki Tatsuta	Apollo Abraham	Brad Jackson	David Gasman
Puar	Naoko Watanabe	Mitch Frankenberger Pellicer	Monika Antonelli	Jodi Forrest
Kame-Sen'nin	Kōhei Miyauchi	Master Buten	Master Roshi	Ed Marcus
Kame-Sen'nin	Kōhei Miyauchi	Nesty Calvo Ramirez	Mike McFarland	Ed Marcus
Turtle	Daisuke Gōri	—N/a	Christopher Sabat	Paul Bandey
Lucifer (ルシフェル, Rushiferu)	Nachi Nozawa	Ray Buyco	Mike McFarland	Paul Bandey
Ghastel (ガステル, Gasuteru)	Daisuke Gōri	Unknown	Mike McFarland	David Gasman
Butler (執事, Shitsuji)	Shōzō Iizuka	Apollo Abraham	Igor	Ed Marcus
Butler (執事, Shitsuji)	Shōzō Iizuka	Apollo Abraham	Christopher Sabat	Ed Marcus
Goblins	Kazuo Oka; Ikuya Sawaki; Masato Hirano; Kazumi Tanaka			Paul Bandey; David Gasman; Ed Marcus
Fitness Instructor	Yoko Kawanami	—N/a	Leslie Alexander	Sharon Mann
Little Pink Creature	Unknown	Unknown	Unknown	Ed Marcus
Narrator	Jōji Yanami	Nesty Calvo Ramirez	Christopher Sabat (Note: The original version of this dub featured a prologue with narration by Jim Conrad from the original English dub of the TV series produced by Funimation with BLT Productions.)	Ed Marcus

== Music ==
- OP (Opening Theme):
  - "Makafushigi Adventure!"
    - Lyrics by Yuriko Mori
    - Music by Takeshi Ike
    - Arranged by Kōhei Tanaka
    - Performed by Hiroki Takahashi
- ED (Ending Theme):
  - "Romantic Ageru yo" (ロマンティックあげるよ, Romantikku Ageru yo; "I'll Give You Romance")
    - Lyrics by Takemi Yoshida
    - Music by Takeshi Ike
    - Arranged by Kōhei Tanaka
    - Performed by Ushio Hashimoto

=== English-language soundtracks ===
The original version of the Funimation's English adaptation from 1998 replaces the opening theme music with the theme song from the 1995 English dub of the TV series, which they co-produced with BLT Productions. The ending theme was replaced with a condensed, instrumental version of the song, as heard in the end credits of each episode of the 1995 dub. This theme song was written by Peter Berring and Brian Griffith and performed by Dave Steele. The remastered DVDs contained the redone English version of the above songs, performed by Jimi Tunnell and Daphne Gere respectively, recorded for the newer dub of the TV series.

The 1996 Creative Products Corporation English dub (combined with the third film) uses a re-orchestrated English version of the opening theme titled "Get that Dragon Ball", performed by Gino Padilla with Age of Wonder, and featured along with other English-language covers of Dragon Ball songs on the album Dragon Ball • Dragon Ball Z: Songs of a High Spirited Saga - Volume I.

== International releases ==
An obscure English dub was produced and released exclusively in Malaysia by Speedy Video, presumably around the late 1990s, which features an unknown voice cast.

The English rights to Sleeping Princess in Devil's Castle were granted to Harmony Gold originally in conjunction with their rights to the TV series in 1989. They edited the other two films into a special, but never actually did anything with this film other than use bits of footage in their opening theme. Funimation acquired the film in 1995, along with the Dragon Ball series, and the rest of the films.

The English dub of Sleeping Princess in Devil's Castle produced by Funimation was released to VHS in North America on December 15, 1998, a few years after Funimation canceled their original short-lived dub of the series with BLT Productions. The film was dubbed as a video special and was a testing ground to see how a release with an in-house voice production would do (a few of the voices, such as Goku, Bulma, and Launch's, would be replaced in future media). However, while the film was dubbed uncut, the opening and closing sequences were altered/replaced. However, unlike the previous dub of the series and the first film, the original musical score was used except for the aforementioned opening and closing. The VHS was released in two formats: "Edited" and "Unedited". In December 2005, the film was released on a bilingual Region 1 DVD individually and as part of Dragon Ball Movie Box Set with Mystical Adventure and The Path to Power. This set was re-released in a thinpack on February 12, 2008. The film was distributed to VHS and Region 4 DVD in Australia by Madman Entertainment. The film was re-released to remastered 4-disc Movie thinpak release with the other Dragon Ball films on February 8, 2011, containing Funimation's existing English dub, but restored the opening/ending.

An alternative English dub was produced in France by AB Groupe and released in English speaking markets in Europe. It featured an uncredited voice cast. Both this dub and the Speedy dub are notoriously known for their poor grammar and voice acting, limited pool of voice artists, and unexplained name changes.

A video tape simply labelled Dragon Ball was discovered, containing a fourth (chronologically, first) English dub produced and released in the Philippines by Regal Home Video in the mid-1990s. This dubbed version was edited down and packaged together with the third Dragon Ball film to make one film, much like Harmony Gold did with the first and third films. The cast is believed to be same cast who would later produce an English dub of the first 49 episodes of Dragon Ball Z and later all 153 episodes of the Dragon Ball series that would air in the Philippines (only the first 122 episodes were dubbed in English, and the rest were dubbed with the voice actors recording lines with both English and Tagalog (Taglish)).

=== Dialogue changes ===
There are several lines that are different in Funimation's English version:

- When Goku and Krillin encounter Ghastel in the Japanese version, they thought he was the Sleeping Princess to which Ghastel revealed he is not. In the English version, the boys demand Ghastel to let the Sleeping Princess go, but he tells them that the Princess is not a human (The Sleeping Princess actually a gem).
- In the English version, Yamcha, Puar and Oolong are already aware of Goku's Great Ape transformation at the full moon and know to attack his tail. It was believed that the film take place after the events of the episodes in the Emperor Pilaf Saga, "A Wish to the Eternal Dragon" and "The Legend of Goku". In the Japanese version, everyone is surprised by the transformation and Krillin figures out the tail is Goku's weakness from when they were previously attacked by Lucifer and his goblin army.
- After Goku turns back to normal from his uncontrollable Great Ape form, he does not remember anything at that time. In the English version of the film, he says to the gang that he understands that there was a giant ape but does not understand why his clothes are gone.
- In the Japanese version, the gang in front of the Devil's Hand was photographed by the camera as they pose for peace. In the English version, the narrator (as an unseen cameraman) called to the gang, "Kids, say cheese.", and they shout back his word before he clicks his camera.
- In the Japanese version, Lucifer is described as a demon. But the VHS releases for the English version mentions that he is a vampire.
- In the English version from Funimation, Goku said "What did you say to her?" as he, Krillin, and Master Roshi back away from Launch immediately before the end credits. This line was removed in post-2005 re-releases so that he is silent, more closely matching the Japanese version, as he does not speak during that moment.

== Box office ==
At the Japanese box office, the film sold 2.6 million tickets and earned a net distribution rental income of ¥850 million.
