= Dragon Ball: Mystical Adventure =

- Theatrical release poster

Japanese name
- Kana: ドラゴンボール 魔訶不思議大冒険
Transcriptions
- Revised Hepburn: Doragon Bōru Makafushigi Dai-Bōken
- Directed by: Kazuhisa Takenouchi
- Screenplay by: Yoshifumi Yuki
- Based on: Dragon Ball and Dr. Slump by Akira Toriyama
- Starring: see below
- Cinematography: Motoaki Ikegami
- Edited by: Shinichi Fukumitsu
- Music by: Shunsuke Kikuchi
- Production company: Toei Animation
- Distributed by: Toei Company
- Release date: July 9, 1988 (Japan)
- Running time: 46 minutes
- Country: Japan
- Box office: ¥1.10 billion (est.)

Dragon Ball: Mystical Adventure (Japanese: ドラゴンボール 魔訶不思議大冒険, Hepburn: Doragon Bōru Makafushigi Dai-Bōken) is a 1988 Japanese anime fantasy martial arts adventure film and the third alternate continuity Dragon Ball feature film. It was released in on July 9, 1988, at the "Toei Manga Matsuri" film festival as part of a quadruple feature along with Bikkuriman 2: The Secret of Muen Zone, Tatakae!! Ramenman, and Kamen Rider Black: Terrifying! The Phantom House of Devil Pass.

Unlike the previous two Dragon Ball films, Mystical Adventure does not introduce any original characters, but instead adapts characters from the Red Ribbon Army and 22nd World Martial Arts Tournament story arcs from the manga into the film's original storyline. It was preceded by Dragon Ball: Sleeping Princess in Devil's Castle and followed by Dragon Ball Z: Dead Zone, the first film entry in the Dragon Ball Z follow-up to the original Dragon Ball series. Another entry in the Dragon Ball film series, Dragon Ball: The Path to Power, released in 1996.

== Plot ==
Mystical Adventure is another retelling of the Dragon Ball story. This time, young Goku and young Krillin are training with Master Roshi for a World Martial Arts Tournament to be held in the country of Mifan. The Emperor of Mifan, Chiaotzu, is trying to find his lost "Ran Ran." "Minister" Master Shen has Emperor Pilaf work on a Dragon Radar, takes it from him, and is using it to locate the Dragon Balls. Shen and Mercenary Tao claim that they will use the wish from Shenron to locate Ran Ran, but are actually planning, with Tien's help, to kill Chiaotzu and take over the country. General Blue announces that Ran Ran is being held in Shen's room, and is killed by Tao for it. Bora and Upa have located the final Dragon Ball and they take it to Mifan to use it to demand that Mifan's soldiers be forced to leave the land near Korin Tower.

Bora is tricked into entering the Tournament (the winner of the Tournament will be granted one wish by Chiaotzu), and is then killed by Tao. Bulma, Oolong, Launch and Puar are looking for the other six Dragon Balls, so Bulma can wish for a boyfriend. However, when the Dragon Balls are located, they are accidentally dropped to the bottom of the moat surrounding Chiaotzu castle. Tien realizes that he likes Chiaotzu too much, and does not kill his friend; instead, he blows away Shen. Then he gives Chiaotzu back Ran Ran (actually a porcelain doll, not a real girl) telling him he had hidden her because of Shen and Tao. The story of Blue and Goku entering Penguin village is included, but this time it is Tao and Goku that meet Arale and Goku kills Tao with Arale's help. Goku throws the final ball into the moat, and summons Shenron, whom Upa asks to resurrect Bora.

== Cast ==
Character name	Voice actor				
Character name	Japanese	English			
Character name	Japanese	Intersound, Inc./Harmony Gold (1989)	Creative Products Corp. (c. 1996)	Funimation (2000)	Unknown/AB Groupe (c. 2003)
Goku	Masako Nozawa	Zero	Nesty Calvo Ramirez	Ceyli Delgadillo	Jodi Forrest
Goku	Masako Nozawa	Barbara Goodson	Nesty Calvo Ramirez	Ceyli Delgadillo	Jodi Forrest
Yamcha	Tōru Furuya	Zedaki	Apollo Abraham	Christopher Sabat	Sharon Mann
Yamcha	Tōru Furuya	Ryan O'Flannigan	Apollo Abraham	Christopher Sabat	Sharon Mann
Bulma	Hiromi Tsuru	Lena	Ethel Lizano	Tiffany Vollmer	Bloomer
Bulma	Hiromi Tsuru	Wendee Lee	Ethel Lizano	Tiffany Vollmer	Sharon Mann
Kame-Sen'nin	Kōhei Miyauchi	Master Roshi	Master Buten	Master Roshi	Crafty Turtle
Kame-Sen'nin	Kōhei Miyauchi	Clifton Wells	Nesty Calvo Ramirez	Mike McFarland	Ed Marcus
Kuririn	Mayumi Tanaka	Bongo	Kririn	Krillin	Clearin
Kuririn	Mayumi Tanaka	Wanda Nowicki	Apollo Abraham	Laurie Steele	Sharon Mann
Lunch	Mami Koyama	Marilynn	Ethel Lizano	Launch	Jodi Forrest
Lunch	Mami Koyama	Edie Mirman	Ethel Lizano	Meredith McCoy	Jodi Forrest
Oolong	Naoki Tatsuta	Mao Mao	Apollo Abraham	Brad M. Jackson	David Gasman
Oolong	Naoki Tatsuta	Colin Philips	Apollo Abraham	Brad M. Jackson	David Gasman
Puar	Naoko Watanabe	Squeaker	Mitch Frankenberger Pellicer	Monika Antonelli	Jodi Forrest
Puar	Naoko Watanabe	Cheryl Chase	Mitch Frankenberger Pellicer	Monika Antonelli	Jodi Forrest
Tenshinhan	Hirotaka Suzuoki	Shinto	Ray Buyco	Tien Shinhan	Tenshin
Tenshinhan	Hirotaka Suzuoki	Eddie Frierson	Ray Buyco	John Burgmeier	David Gasman
Chaozu	Hiroko Emori	Rebecca Forstadt	Ethel Lizano	Chiaotzu	Chaos
Chaozu	Hiroko Emori	Rebecca Forstadt	Ethel Lizano	Monika Antonelli	Jodi Forrest
Turtle	Daisuke Gōri	Dan Woren	Unknown	Christopher Sabat	Paul Bandey; Sharon Mann (some lines)
Tsuru-Sen'nin (Crane Hermit)	Ichirō Nagai	Lord Wu Zu	Master Crane	Master Shen	Paul Bandey
Tsuru-Sen'nin (Crane Hermit)	Ichirō Nagai	Robert Axelrod	R.J. Celdran	Chuck Huber	Paul Bandey
Taopaipai	Chikao Ōtsuka	General Tao Pei	Cao-Pai-Tek	Mercenary Tao	Ed Marcus
Taopaipai	Chikao Ōtsuka	Michael McConnohie	R.J. Celdran	Kent Williams	Ed Marcus
Shenlong	Kenji Utsumi	Dragon God	—N/a	Shenron	Sacred Dragon
Shenlong	Kenji Utsumi	Steve Kramer	—N/a	Christopher Sabat	—N/a
Tournament Announcer	Kenji Utsumi	Dan Woren	Apollo Abraham	Justin Cook	David Gasman
General Blue	Toshio Furukawa	Dave Mallow	—N/a	Sonny Strait	Ed Marcus (one line); David Gasman
Sergeant Metallic	Shin Aomori	Major Fist	Unknown	Major Metallitron	Agent Metallic
Sergeant Metallic	Shin Aomori	Bill Capizzi	Unknown	Chris Rager	Paul Bandey
Upa	Mitsuko Horie	Littlefoot	Unknown	Kara Edwards	Sharon Mann
Upa	Mitsuko Horie	Jamie Johnston	Unknown	Kara Edwards	Sharon Mann
Bora	Banjō Ginga	Haymaker	Apollo Abraham	Dameon Clarke	David Gasman
Bora	Banjō Ginga	Bob Papenbrook	Apollo Abraham	Dameon Clarke	David Gasman
Karin	Ichirō Nagai	Whiskers the Wonder Cat	Ray Buyco	Korin	Sharon Mann
Karin	Ichirō Nagai	Theodore Lehmann	Ray Buyco	Mark Britten	Sharon Mann
Arale Norimaki	Mami Koyama	Unknown	Unknown	Linda Young	Sharon Mann
Gatchans #1 and #2	Seiko Nakano	Unknown	Unknown	Unknown	Unknown
Senbei Norimaki	Kenji Utsumi	Unknown	Apollo Abraham	Sonny Strait	Ed Marcus
Pilaf	Shigeru Chiba	Oculi	Apollo Abraham	Mike McFarland	Sharon Mann
Pilaf	Shigeru Chiba	Dave Mallow	Apollo Abraham	Mike McFarland	Sharon Mann
Shu	Tesshō Genda	Chow	Nesty Calvo Ramirez	Brian Thomas	Jodi Forrest
Shu	Tesshō Genda	Dave Mallow	Nesty Calvo Ramirez	Brian Thomas	Jodi Forrest
Mai	Eiko Yamada	Feminah	Ethel Lizano	Cynthia Cranz	Jodi Forrest
Mai	Eiko Yamada	Melodee Spevack	Ethel Lizano	Cynthia Cranz	Jodi Forrest
Soldiers	Masato Hirano; Hirohiko Kakegawa; Hiroyuki Satō	Eddie Frierson; Dave Mallow; Barry Stigler; Dan Woren; Steve Kramer; Stephen Apostolina			
Narrator	Jōji Yanami	Michael McConnohie	Nesty Calvo Ramirez	Christopher Sabat	Ed Marcus

== Music ==
- OP (Opening Theme):
  - "Makafushigi Adventure!"
    - Lyrics by Yuriko Mori
    - Music by Takeshi Ike
    - Arranged by Kōhei Tanaka
    - Performed by Hiroki Takahashi
- ED (Ending Theme):
  - Doragon Bōru Densetsu (ドラゴンボール伝説, "Dragon Ball Legend")
    - Lyrics by Onikado Izumi
    - Music by Takeshi Ike
    - Arranged by Seiichi Kyōda
    - Performed by Hiroki Takahashi

== Releases ==
=== Box office ===
At the Japanese box office, the film sold 1.9 million tickets and earned a net distribution rental income of ¥650 million.

=== English-language versions ===
Harmony Gold USA broadcast their dub of this film and Curse of the Blood Rubies as a double feature on WPSG Philly 57 in Philadelphia, Pennsylvania and on other channels and cable systems in a select few test markets. It was also likely to have been released on home video in the early 90s. It was not widely noticed and went under the radar. Their dub changed the names of some of the characters and had parts of it censored, and the opening and ending sequence changed with; instead of the first Japanese sequence they used the second Japanese sequence, with the Japanese katakana removed from the Dragon Balls, the Japanese credits removed and replaced with the Harmony Gold credits, and they changed some of the dialog from the Japanese intro. The ending was changed from the Japanese ending to show a still picture of Goku flying away from Shenron (known as Dragon God in the Harmony Gold dub) taken from the intro, and using the intro theme song instead of the Japanese ending theme with the Harmony Gold credits. The script was more faithful to the Japanese script and all the background music was kept the same, unlike the Funimation and AB Groupe dubs.

There was also another English dub released exclusively to Video CD by Speedy Video. This English version, produced and released exclusively in Malaysia, features an unknown cast and original music.

Funimation acquired the rights to the film in 2000 and released it with a new dub to VHS and bilingual DVD that year.

Madman Entertainment released the film on DVD in Australia and New Zealand on March 17, 2004, with the 2000 English dub and optional Japanese audio. However, the introduction, which began the narration of the Dragon Balls, a cameo sequence of Pilaf and his gang presenting a global dragon radar to Master Shen, and a different opening sequence to the film featuring Goku and Krillin in training were cut. Instead, the opening sequence and scenes aforementioned were replaced with the TV opening sequence. Another sequence cut was the closing credits featuring a summoned Shenron who fulfilled Upa's wish to bring Bora back to life. The scene was replaced with the TV closing sequence.

Subsequent versions of the FUNimation dub had restored its introduction and its opening/ending sequence. Unlike the Japanese version however, the opening sequence had many scenes in freeze-frame, as a way to block out the original Japanese credits that were in the sequence. The closing credits was restored with English credits censoring half the screen, also as a way to block out the original Japanese credits scrolling from the right.

The film was later available on DVD along with Sleeping Princess in Devil's Castle and Path to Power as part of FUNimation's Dragon Ball Movie Box set released on December 6, 2005. The box set was re-released as a thinpack on February 12, 2008. This set has since been discontinued.

The film was re-released to DVD in America on February 8, 2011, as a part of a Dragon Ball Movie 4-Pack remastered thinpack release from FUNimation along with the other Dragon Ball related films. This release restored all of the previously edited video footage of the film, but no apparent English credits are shown.

An alternative English dub produced with an uncredited cast by AB Groupe in France was released in English speaking markets in Europe in the early 2000s. It aired on Toonami in the UK in 2005.

The film was edited and combined with the second film, into a compilation film titled Dragon Ball, released in the Philippines by Regal Home Video in the mid/late 1990s. The cast is believed to have also dubbed the original Dragon Ball series and the first 26 episodes of Dragon Ball Z exclusively for airing in the Philippines. It was also released in Philippine theaters as Dragon Ball: Hearts on Fire in 1999 by Regal Entertainment, along with the Filipino dub of Yu Yu Hakusho: The Golden Seal titled Ghost Fighter: The Next Mission.
