= Zamasu =

Fictional character from the Dragon Ball franchise

- Dragon Ball character
- Present Zamasu/Goku Black (left) and Future Zamasu (right), as depicted in the manga adaptation, illustrated by Toyotarou.
- First appearance: Dragon Ball Super episode #47: "SOS from the Future: A Dark New Enemy Appears!" (2016)
- Created by: Akira Toriyama
- Voiced by: Japanese: Masako Nozawa (as Goku Black and Gohan Black); Shin-ichiro Miki (as Zamasu); English: Sean Schemmel (as Goku Black); Kyle Hebert (as Gohan Black); James Marsters (Note: Credited as "David Gray" in Dragon Ball Super, and "Sam Majesters" in Dragon Ball FighterZ.) (as Zamasu)

In-universe information
- Aliases: Son Goku (adopted name); Goku Black (sobriquet)
- Species: Glind (Zamasu); Saiyan (Goku Black)

Zamasu (ザマス), spelled Zamas in Viz Media's English localization of the Dragon Ball Super manga, is a fictional character and an antagonist in the Japanese manga series Dragon Ball created by Akira Toriyama. He is the first main antagonist of the sequel series Dragon Ball Super, who appears in various incarnations, first introduced as Goku Black (ゴクウブラック, Gokū Burakku) in the forty-seventh episode of the Dragon Ball Super anime series, which first aired on June 12, 2016, and in chapter #14 "An SOS from the Future!!" from the manga.

Within the series, Zamasu is an apprentice Supreme Kai (界王神, Kaiōshin; lit. 'World King God') from Universe 10. In the series' original unaltered timeline, Zamasu hijacked Son Goku's body by using the Super Dragon Balls as part of "Project Zero Mortals" ("Zero Mortal Plan"/"Zero People Plan"). His plan is to attain supreme power and wipe out all mortal beings. He travels to an alternate future Earth and encounters the timeline's version of Trunks. Zamasu proceeds to bring humanity to the brink of extinction. To complete his plan, he joins forces with the future timeline's version of Zamasu, who is made indestructible. The character has been positively received and is regarded as one of the best villains/antagonists of the Dragon Ball franchise.

== Concept design ==
Goku Black as draw by Akira Toriyama, in base and Super Saiyan Rosé form.

Toriyama got the inspiration for Goku Black from characters who are presented as evil "copies" of the hero character in classic tokusatsu programs such as Ultraman, Kamen Rider, and Kamen Rider Black. Toriyama originally devised Zamasu as a character who is on par in single combat with an individual who has attained the Super Saiyan Blue form, whereas other elements such as the retconned time limit of Potara fusions and Zamasu's effective immortality were added to make the fight more interesting. Goku and Vegeta were depicted as struggling against Zamasu in combat due to his tricky nature, as well as their own lack of teamwork. Toei Animation Producer Atsushi Kido said Fused Zamasu is a "cheat" character for his massive strength, and that his one weakness could be that he was originally a single person.

=== Character ===
Zamasu is depicted as a green-skinned humanoid with grey eyes and a white mohawk. He gains Goku's appearance after switching bodies with him, with only slight physical differences. Aside from a single gold and green Potara earring on his left ear, he also wears a Time Ring on his right index finger, which allows him to travel between different timelines at will without the need of a time machine, and also protects him from being erased by temporal paradoxes. After attaining the Super Saiyan Rosé (超サイヤ人ロゼ, Sūpā Saiya-jin Roze) transformation, which was soon explained to be Goku Black's version of Super Saiyan for the anime, and this version of the Super Saiyan form was equal to Goku's Super Saiyan Blue form (Super Saiyan God Super Saiyan) in terms of power-level. In the manga, Goku Black's hair turns bright pink, due to Zamasu's status as a deity.

After Goku Black merges with his alternate future self via the use of a pair of matching Potara earrings, the result is the even more powerful Fused Zamasu (合体ザマス, Gattai Zamasu), described as a mixture of incredible power with a deteriorating, yet immortal, body and unhinged mind. The resulting fusion is later revealed to be flawed as Fused Zamasu later degenerates into a grotesque appearance with the left half his body turning into purple sludge. In the anime, this is explained as a result of an unstable and uneven cellular regeneration as the fusion is composed of a mortal (Goku Black) and an immortal (Zamasu). In the manga, this form was explained to be a "temporary" form that Fused Zamasu assumed when he resisted being split apart after the time limit of the Potara fusion passed. Another reason that Fused Zamasu's mortal side (Goku Black) mutated, is that Potara fusion is permanent for Kais, Zamasu, being an apprentice Supreme Kai (界王神, Kaiōshin) himself. Thus, the Potara fusion should've been temporary, but since Goku Black was a mortal, it had caused a mutation in the fusion.

Following the defeat of Fused Zamasu, he transcends into the even more powerful Infinite Zamasu form, though the character's depiction differs considerably between the anime and manga versions. In the anime, Infinite Zamasu is an incorporeal energy being while the manga version is an evolved form of Fused Zamasu, his regeneration ability becoming advanced enough to the point where he is capable of creating seemingly infinite fully grown clones of himself from each cell in his body within seconds, after both composite beings successfully and permanently merged at a cellular level.

=== Voice actors ===
Zamasu is voiced by Shinichiro Miki in Japanese media. David Gray is credited as the English voice actor for the FUNimation. Some sources speculated that David Gray, along with Sam Majesters, who is credited as Zamasu's voice actor in Dragon Ball FighterZ, were in fact the aliases used by American actor James Marsters, who previously played King Piccolo in Dragonball Evolution. Sean Schemmel, who voices Goku and Goku Black, claimed in an interview that FUNimation wanted to keep Marsters' involvement as a surprise. Marsters did not provide confirmation as to whether he is the English voice actor for Zamasu in Dragon Ball Super until a Fan Expo Canada event in October 2021.

Goku Black shares the same voice actors as Goku in all media. He is voiced by Masako Nozawa in Japanese, and Sean Schemmel in English. Kofi Outlaw from Comicbook.com noted that Schemmel's voice for Goku Black is very different in Dragon Ball Xenoverse 2 and Dragon Ball FighterZ compared to his performance in the FUNimation dub, which was released after the video games. Schemmel indicated that he did not want to copy Nozawa's approach to portray Goku Black; instead, he wanted to emulate Marsters' performance, as he is supposed to embody the spirit of the same character, who happened to have taken possession of Goku's physical body. Outlaw described his voice in the anime dub to be very similar to his friendly, dulcet tones for Goku, but noted as more sinister and twisted.

== Abilities ==
Both Goku Black and Zamasu possess several abilities, including superhuman strength, speed, reflexes and energy blasts. Zamasu and his various incarnations project an energy blade from their hand (神裂斬 (Kami Retsuzan; lit. 'God Split Cut')) as their primary form of attack. As Goku Black, Zamasu is capable of growing stronger from near-death experiences due to the host body's Saiyan physiology, and is able to perform most of Goku's abilities, in particular his teleportation skill Shunkan Idō (瞬間移動; lit. "Instantaneous Movement", renamed "Instant Transmission" in FUNimation's dub) as well as a variant of his signature move, the Black Kamehameha (ブラックかめはめ波, Burakku Kamehameha; lit. 'Black Kamehame Wave'). As Goku Black, Zamasu has the ability to transform into a pink-haired variant of the Super Saiyan Blue form, Super Saiyan Rosé (超スーパーサイヤ人ロゼ, Sūpa Saiya-jin Rozē), after mastering his host body's power. This transformation also enhances his energy control, allowing him to refine his weapon forging skills, from creating a huge sword from his palm, to a long scythe capable of tearing holes in the fabric of space-time, summoning copies of himself.

Later on, both versions of Zamasu merge via Potara earrings, creating an indestructible being who can increase steadily in might. However, due to the conflicting natures of a combined mortal and immortal body, this combined form becomes deformed after taking too much damage, giving Zamasu a deranged, grotesque, monstrous appearance that grew larger upon hitting himself with the so-called "Light of Justice".

== Appearances ==
=== Dragon Ball Super ===
Goku Black first appears in the alternate future timeline where Future Trunks resides as a mysterious entity who is identical in visage to Goku, and refers to himself as such. He kills that timeline's Bulma after she gave her son the means to travel back in time to beseech the aid of Goku and Vegeta, momentarily pursuing him back in time through the Time Capsule's temporal distortion. Black momentarily engages Goku before being drawn back to the collapsing portal while destroying the time machine, realizing the fight has allowed him to become better accustomed to his new body. Goku, Whis and Beerus travel to the Tenth Universe after the two deities sense the similarities between Black and Zamasu, an apprentice of the resident Supreme Kai Gowasu of the Tenth Universe. Both the encounter and news of the present timeline's Zamasu inquiring about the Super Dragon Balls and Goku adds further depth to the mystery as Goku, Beerus, Whis, and the Seventh Universe's Supreme Kai stop him from murdering Gowasu with Beerus believing he solved the crisis by completely destroying Zamasu which would negate future versions of himself.

By the time the Saiyans reach Trunks's time, they are forced to retreat to their time after being outmatched by Black in his Super Saiyan Rosé form and the period's version of Zamasu. It is later revealed that Black's Time Ring, which he claimed after murdering Gowasu, allows him to survive his past self's demise as he and Zamasu reveal their true origins, triggering Future Trunk's transformation into Super Saiyan Rage by revealing that their actions were made possible by his previous time travel. Zamasu clings onto his fanatical belief of mortals as being inherently evil despite his mentor's attempts to show the good in them, which worsens since his defeat by Goku and his descent into madness as his hatred for mortals extended to the deities allowing them to exist. Upon learning of the Super Dragon Balls prior to killing Gowasu to acquire his Potara Earrings and Time Ring, Zamasu uses the Super Dragon Balls to exchange bodies with Goku before killing him and his family. Later called "Goku Black", he traveled to Future Trunks' timeline where he joins forces with an alternate future version of himself who never encountered Goku and used the Super Dragon Balls to make his mortal body effectively unkillable. The two versions of Zamasu proceed to wipe out the other deities so nothing can interfere in them systematically exterminating all mortal life before reaching the Seventh Universe's Earth, believing that utopia could only be achieved for the multiverse by bringing about the annihilation of humanity and all other mortal beings which he views as corrupt and violent.

Goku Black and Zamasu combat Trunks while Goku and Vegeta return to the past, with Goku learning the Evil Containment Wave while Vegeta trains in the Hyperbolic Time Chamber. They two quickly return as the two versions of Zamasu nearly killed Future Trunks. But the failed attempt to seal Future Zamasu by Trunks and Future Mai and Black being defeated by Vegeta causes the pair to realize they have underestimated their enemies, using their Potara Earrings to fuse into Fused Zamasu. Fused Zamasu easily overwhelms everyone, forcing Goku and Vegeta's fusion into Vegito, who is able to match him in strength and even overpower him, before the fusion abruptly ends. Trunks then gains power from every remaining living thing on Earth, generating a Spirit Bomb that he channels into his sword to slice Fused Zamasu in half, destroying his body.

Zamasu survives the death blow and his essence transcends into a more dangerous form known as "Infinite Zamasu". The anime depicts him as an energy being that gradually consumes the future multiverse, while killing off everyone on Earth, save Goku, Vegeta, Bulma, Trunks, Mai, Gowasu, and the Supreme Kai of Universe 7. The manga depicts Infinite Zamasu as the splintered Future Zamasu and Goku Black, each transformed on his own into an enhanced version of Fused Zamasu, as a cellular side-effect of their fusion, with their regenerative powers becoming advanced enough that Vegeta unintentionally created an army of Infinite Zamasus that overwhelms the heroes. Both versions of the story result in Goku summoning the alternate future's version of Zeno, who expresses disgust towards Infinite Zamasu and completely wipes him out by erasing the entire multiverse of the alternate future timeline. Whis later goes to the new alternate timeline he intends to send Trunks and Mai to warn that timeline's Beerus of Zamasu's intentions, thus making sure his plans never come to be.

=== In Toriyama's films and in other media ===
Goku Black briefly appears in Dragon Ball Z: Resurrection 'F' – 'Future Trunks Special Edition' and attempts to kill Trunks, but was stopped by Mai's intervention. This takes place before his debut in Dragon Ball Super.

An event called the Dragon Ball Tenkaichi Budosai 2017, which ran from August 10, 2017, to August 27, 2017, was held in the Sunshine City building complex in Ikebukuro, Tokyo. The free-entry event was based on the Dragon Ball Super, with Zamasu and Goku Black being the central antagonists. The venue was divided into several areas, with the mystery-solving event titled "Beat the Merged Zamasu!"

Zamasu appears as a cybernetic version of his Fused Zamasu form in Super Dragon Ball Heroes, a promotional anime for the Dragon Ball Heroes trading card arcade game. He was brought back by Fu, and is recruited by Hearts alongside four other dangerous criminals from the Prison Planet, as part of their plot to obtain the Universe Seed and destroy all the deities. They eventually succeed in completing the Universe Seed, which Hearts absorbs to acquire his Godslayer form, but immediately afterward, Godslayer Hearts turns on Zamasu, erasing him from existence, as he wishes to terminate all deities, regardless of their affiliation. Later in the series, another alternate timeline version of Zamasu appears in his Goku Black guise. This version of Zamasu had his history altered, after Fu told him about his future. This incarnation of Goku Black killed 99 alternate timeline Gokus and also attempted to complete Project Zero Mortals, obtaining the Super Saiyan Rosé 2 and 3 transformations in the process, before he was finally finished by Gogeta in his Super Saiyan Blue Evolved form.

Goku Black is a playable DLC character in Dragon Ball Xenoverse 2 as a pre-order bonus, while Zamasu and Goku Black (Super Saiyan Rosé) are playable characters in the Pack 3 DLC, and Fused Zamasu is playable in the Pack 4 DLC. They also appear in Dragon Ball Fusions. Goku Black in his Super Saiyan Rosé form is available as part of the base roster for the fighting game Dragon Ball FighterZ, while Fused Zamasu is later added for purchase as part of FighterZ Pass 2.

A version of Zamasu as Gohan Black appears in a Dragon Ball: Sparking! Zero what-if scenario.

== Reception ==
Various sources have speculated on Goku Black's origins prior to the revelation of his true identity. The character has received a positive reception, particularly after the full reveal of his backstory and motivations. The Goku Black incarnation of the character is particularly popular, placing fourth by fan vote in a poll of Dragon Ball antagonists published by the March 2018 issue of V Jump.

Kotaku staff praised the design of Goku Black's hair, and consider Zamasu and his incarnations to be "easily some of the best villains in Dragon Ball history". Jay Gibbs from ComicsVerse formed the view that Zamasu is the greatest Dragon Ball villain of all time. Gibbs opined that Zamasu smartly planned ahead and exploited the most overpowered elements of the series that its own protagonists had ease of access to, such as Saiyan powers and the Dragon Balls, and argued that he didn't really lose in the traditional sense since an entire timeline and all life in it had to be erased by Zeno in the process. Nick Valdez from Comicbook.com thought Zamasu's elitism and misanthropy, which sees the character falling from grace, and his Goku Black persona helped him stand out over previous villains in the franchise. Joseph Ocasio from CBR ranked Goku Black and Zamasu as the best characters introduced in the Dragon Ball Super series and drew a comparison to Marvel Cinematic Universe characters Ultron and Thanos,The Matrix main villain Agent Smith and the Death Note villain protagonist Light Yagami, a self-righteous "hero" who attempts to bring balance by getting rid of those he perceives the impure or unworthy. Stefan Sgarioto from Madman Entertainment ranked Goku Black the sixth most memorable villain of the Dragon Ball series and praised the design of his Super Saiyan Rosé form. Simon Alvarez from The Inquisitr praised the fight between Vegito and Fused Zamasu and considered it one of the best animated battle sequences in the Dragon Ball Super series. Shawn Sharis from IGN considers the final blow delivered to Zamasu by Trunks to be one of the greatest moments in Dragon Ball Super.

Schemmel's performance as Goku Black has been praised by series fans. Valdez noted that it differs from Nozawa's performance in the original Japanese version, and that Schemmel has twisted his Goku voice to frame the character in a "destructive and disturbing light."

== See also ==
- List of Dragon Ball characters
