= Dragon Ball Xenoverse 2 =

2016 video game

- Cover art featuring Super Saiyan Future Gohan, Bardock, and Super Saiyan Goku
- Developer: Dimps
- Publisher: Bandai Namco Entertainment
- Directors: Yuka Kobayashi; Takeshi Sakamoto
- Producers: Masayuki Hirano; Masahiro Kashiro
- Designer: Tsuyoshi Narabayashi
- Artist: Shohei Imamura
- Writers: Kaori Osamura; Yuki Hosokawa
- Composers: Yoshichika Kuriyama; Shiho Tereda; Atsushi Yokozeki; Steve Aoki
- Series: Dragon Ball
- Platforms: PlayStation 4; Xbox One; Windows; Nintendo Switch; Stadia; PlayStation 5; Xbox Series X/S
- Release: October 25, 2016: PlayStation 4; NA: October 25, 2016; EU: October 28, 2016; JP: November 2, 2016 Xbox One; NA: October 25, 2016; EU: October 28, 2016; JP: May 24, 2024 Windows; WW: October 27, 2016; JP: May 23, 2024 Nintendo Switch; JP: September 7, 2017; WW: September 22, 2017 Stadia; WW: December 17, 2019 PS5, Xbox Series X/S; WW: May 24, 2024
- Genres: Fighting, role-playing
- Modes: Single-player, multiplayer

Dragon Ball Xenoverse 2 (Note: Japanese: ドラゴンボールゼノバース2, Hepburn: Doragon Bōru Zenobāsu Tsū) is an action role-playing fighting game developed by Dimps and published by Bandai Namco Entertainment. It is a spin-off of the Dragon Ball franchise and the sequel to the 2015 game Dragon Ball Xenoverse. It was released on October 25, 2016, for PlayStation 4 and Xbox One, and on October 27 for Windows. In Japan, Dragon Ball Xenoverse 2 was initially only available on PlayStation 4. The game was released for the Nintendo Switch in Japan on September 7, 2017, and later released worldwide on September 22, 2017. The game saw further releases on Stadia on December 17, 2019, and Playstation 5 and Xbox Series X/S on May 24, 2024.

Xenoverse 2 received positive reviews from critics and had sold over 10 million copies worldwide as of May 2023. A sequel, Dragon Ball Xenoverse 3, is set to release in 2027.

== Gameplay ==
The player character fires a Kamehameha at Raditz in a recreation of the fight between him, Goku, and Piccolo in Dragon Ball Z; Goku serves as the player's teammate.

The game is very similar to its predecessor in terms of gameplay with a few notable upgrades. It is primarily set in 3D battle arenas modeled after notable locations in the Dragon Ball universe, with the central hub being an expanded version of Toki-Toki City, known as Conton City created by the Supreme Kai of time. As reported by the creators of the game, Conton City is seven times larger than Toki-Toki City. Players are able to freely traverse the hub world, and in some areas are capable of flying, once they have unlocked the ability. Players are also able to travel to other locations such as the Namekian Village and Frieza's ship. As in the previous games, some skills have to be learned through masters and other non-player characters, some of whom are found exclusively in those additional areas. Xenoverse 2 is the fourth Dragon Ball video game to feature character customization, and allows players to choose from five races: Humans, Saiyans, Majins, Namekians and Frieza's race, each with different strengths and weaknesses.

The game also features race-specific quests, minigames, and transformations (the latter of which was available only to Saiyans in the first game via the Super Saiyan forms) Multiplayer servers hold up to 3,000 players at once. The game also has a training mode where you have access to the games character roster. The player can use different kinds of ki blasts (Power, Homing, Rush, Paralyze and Bomb), and the ki blast type depends on the player's race or Super Soul. Additionally, players are able to transfer their save data from Dragon Ball Xenoverse. This results in a projection of the player's custom character from the previous game appearing as Toki Toki City's "Hero" in the middle of the square. Players may also select a premade avatar to serve as the "Hero" if they do not transfer save data.

== Plot ==
Two years after the events of Dragon Ball Xenoverse, the new protagonist—now a member of the Time Patrol—receives a mission from Elder Kai to correct distortions in history. They meet the Supreme Kai of Time and her bird Tokitoki, who is preparing to lay an egg that will give birth to a new Timeline. Their first mission involves assisting Goku against his older brother Raditz, who has been strengthened by demon realm magic. Behind these changes are Towa and Mira, who are recruiting powerful allies across numerous timelines.

During the Saiyan Saga, the Time Patroller teams up with Goku to stop Turles from sabotaging the battle against Nappa and Prince Vegeta, defeating both Saiyans in their Great Ape forms. On Namek, the Patroller aids Gohan and Krillin, foils Captain Ginyu's body-swapping schemes, and helps Goku defeat Frieza and his brother older Cooler, who arrive together. The Patroller also intervenes in Future Trunks' timeline, saving Future Gohan from a reprogrammed Android 16 and repelling Mira. Despite being forbidden to interfere, Trunks briefly joins Future Gohan's fight against the Androids before Gohan convinces him to accept his fate and safeguard their future.

The Patroller later aids Trunks' younger self after the Cell Games, defeating both Future Cell and the Androids with Trunks' help. With Trunks' timeline stabilized, the Patroller moves on to the Majin Buu era, stopping Broly's interference during Vegeta's sacrifice and helping Goku and Vegeta defeat Kid Buu. In Hell, they face Janemba (from Fusion Reborn), enabling Vegeta's return to Earth and the fusion into Vegito. The Patroller next confronts the Masked Saiyan—revealed as Bardock, Goku's father—during Goku's battle with Beerus. Mira intervenes, but Beerus' rage over a pudding incident forces the Patroller and Whis to calm him down.

The story continues with the Resurrection 'F' saga, where Frieza returns with Metal Cooler. Towa manipulates events, but Whis rewinds time, allowing Goku, Vegeta, and the Patroller to defeat them. Bardock, now freed from Towa's control, sacrifices himself to help aid against the battle against Mira who had begun to spiral outside of Towa's control, disappearing into a wormhole, while another masked warrior—actually the protagonist from the first game—fights alongside the Patroller before vanishing. History is then altered so that everyone in Conton City believes the new protagonist is the original hero. Investigating, the Patroller prevents Towa from killing Shenron in Age 850, restoring the timeline and summoning the original hero back.

Towa's final plan involves stealing Tokitoki's egg to provide enough energy for the revival of the demon realm. Mira betrays and absorbs Towa, becoming a near-unstoppable foe. With Goku's help, the Patroller defeats Mira, and the egg hatches, birthing a new timeline. A celebratory feast follows, conjured by Shenron due to the Supreme Kai of Time's infamous cooking. The two heroes of Conton City spar to test their strength, though the result is left unknown.

In addition to the main "Critical Mission," the Patroller investigates five large Time Rifts tied to the player's chosen race—Saiyan (Capsule Corp.), Earthling (Hercule's Mansion), Namekian (Guru's House), Frieza Race (Frieza's Spaceship), or Majin (Buu's House). Each rift offers unique rewards, race-exclusive Awoken Skills (e.g., Super Saiyan, Giant Namekian, Turn Golden, Purification), and Distorted Time Eggs, remnants of Towa's attempts to replicate Tokitoki's egg. Though stable, these rifts contain altered histories not recorded in the official scrolls, so the Supreme Kai of Time opts to contain rather than erase them.

Collecting all five Distorted Time Eggs unlocks the Unknown History Saga, revealing Bardock's battle against Mira. Bardock ascends through Super Saiyan 1 to 3, defeating Mira before vanishing from the rift. The Patroller then witnesses a new, alternate future created by the Eggs, where Trunks successfully aids Future Gohan in defeating the Androids. The Supreme Kai of Time asks the Patroller whether this timeline should remain. Regardless of the player's choice, the Kai's final decision remains ambiguous. Having seen the Eggs' potential to reshape reality, the Time Patrol takes measures to ensure no further distortions threaten history.

== Development ==
The game was originally teased by Bandai Namco Entertainment on May 16, 2016, as a new "Dragon Ball project", with it being announced on May 17, 2016. A Bandai Namco spokesperson confirmed that the game would be released on the PlayStation 4 in Japan, and for PlayStation 4, Xbox One, and Windows in North America and Europe. Bandai Namco announced at E3 2016 that the game would run at a frame rate of 60 frames per second on all three platforms, would have a hub city that is seven times larger than its predecessor, and would also feature a new transportation system.

An open and closed beta for Xenoverse 2 was announced by Bandai Namco in August 2016. Both the open and closed beta were available exclusively on PlayStation 4. The closed beta began on October 8, and ended on October 10, and the open beta began on October 14, and ended on October 17.

The Collector's Edition of the game includes the game disc, a soundtrack CD, a collector's box, an exclusive steelbook case, a Time Patroller's Guide artbook (including an exclusive manga illustrated by Toyotarou based on the game), and a statue of Super Saiyan Goku. It is available for Xbox One and PlayStation 4.

A Nintendo Switch port was revealed on January 12, 2017, in the Nintendo Switch's "Software Line-Up" Video.

On March 20, 2019, a free-to-play "Lite Version" was released on PS4 and Xbox One with a subset of the full game's content and a lower level cap.

The Stadia port was revealed on December 17, 2019, on the "Stadia Community Blog" by the official Stadia team and released three hours later.

Ports for PlayStation 5 and Xbox Series X/S were announced in October 2023. Available as a free upgrade to existing owners, the ports were released worldwide on May 24, 2024. The Xbox One version was also released in Japan on the same date.

== Downloadable content ==
A series of downloadable content packs have been released, generally including two to four characters, main/extra story missions, stages, new moves, skills, parallel quests, and other elements for the added characters.

- Pre-Order Bonus - Includes Goku Black from Dragon Ball Super as a playable character and the Tao Pai Pai Stick as a hub vehicle. It is also included in the Nintendo Switch version and Stadia version.
- Steve Aoki Pack - Free DLC that adds the "DJ" NPC to Conton City which, when interacted with, plays one of Steve Aoki's two remixes of Cha-La Head-Cha-La or We Gotta Power made for Dragon Ball Xenoverse 2. Later delisted from most digital stores.
- Masters Pack - Free DLC that adds 5 Masters: Android 16 from the Android Saga, Bardock and Future Gohan from The Father of Goku and The History of Trunks television specials, Cooler from the film Cooler's Revenge, and Whis from Dragon Ball Super. Included with the base game on Steam and Stadia.
- DLC Pack 1/Dragon Ball Super Pack 1 - Includes Frost and Cabba from Dragon Ball Super as playable characters.
- DLC Pack 2/Dragon Ball Super Pack 2 - Includes content from the Universe 6 Saga: Vados and God of Destruction Champa as playable characters, the Universe 6 Saga for story mode, and the Nameless Planet stage from DB Super
- DLC Pack 3/Dragon Ball Super Pack 3 - Includes Rosé Goku Black, Zamasu from Dragon Ball Super, and Bojack from the film Bojack Unbound as playable characters.
- DLC Pack 4/Dragon Ball Super Pack 4 - Includes content from Future Trunks Saga: Fused Zamasu and SSGSS Vegito as playable characters, the Warrior of Hope Saga for story mode, and the Future in Ruins stage from DB Super
- DLC Pack 5/Extra Pack 1 - Includes Majin Buu (Gohan absorbed), Dabura from Dragon Ball Z's Buu Saga, and Android 13, Tapion from the films Super Android 13 and Wrath of the Dragon as playable characters.
- DLC Pack 6/Extra Pack 2 - Includes Goku (Ultra Instinct), Jiren, Android 17 (DB Super) from Dragon Ball Super, and an original character named Fu as playable characters, and a new extra mission "infinite history saga".
- DLC Pack 7/Extra Pack 3 - Includes Kefla (Super Saiyan) from Dragon Ball Super, and Super Baby 2 from Dragon Ball GT as playable characters.
- DLC Pack 8/Extra Pack 4 - Includes SSGSS Gogeta and Broly (Full Power Super Saiyan) from the 2018 film Dragon Ball Super: Broly as playable characters, and the Tournament of Power arena from Dragon Ball Super.
- Anime Music Pack 1 - Includes 11 songs from Dragon Ball, Dragon Ball Z, and Dragon Ball GT. Not available in the Stadia version.
- Anime Music Pack 2 - Includes songs from Dragon Ball Kai and Dragon Ball Super, and extra songs from Dragon Ball Z. Not available in the Stadia version.
- DLC Pack 9/Ultra Pack 1 - Includes Ribrianne and SSGSS Vegeta (Evolved) from Dragon Ball Super, and another variation of Vegeta (Super Saiyan God) from the 2018 film Dragon Ball Super: Broly as playable characters.
- DLC Pack 10/Ultra Pack 2 - Includes Uub as Majuub from Dragon Ball GT and Android 21 from the 2018 video game Dragon Ball FighterZ as playable characters.
- August 2020 Free Update - Includes Supreme Kai of Time as a playable character in honor of the game selling 6 million copies worldwide.
- DLC Pack 11/Legendary Pack 1 - Includes Pikkon from the film Fusion Reborn and Toppo (God of Destruction) from Dragon Ball Super as playable characters, as well as two new expanded extra missions.
- DLC Pack 12/Legendary Pack 2 - Includes Kale (Super Saiyan 2), Caulifa (Super Saiyan 2), Jiren (Full Power) from Dragon Ball Super, and Gogeta (DB Super) from the 2018 film Dragon Ball Super: Broly as playable characters, the Volcanic Wasteland stage from DBS Broly, as well as three new expanded extra missions.
- Legend Patrol Pack - Includes the entire story campaign from the original Dragon Ball Xenoverse, in addition to its GT Saga DLC campaign. Initially as a Nintendo Switch exclusive, it released for PlayStation 4, Xbox One, PC & Google Stadia alongside the launch of the Conton City Vote Pack.
- DLC Pack 13/Conton City Vote Pack - Includes Goku (Ultra Instinct -Sign-), Dyspo from Dragon Ball Super, and Vegeta (GT) from Dragon Ball GT as playable characters, as well as two new expanded extra missions.
- DLC Pack 14/Hero of Justice Pack 1 - Includes Gamma 1, Gamma 2 & Gohan (DBS Super Hero) from the 2022 film Dragon Ball Super: Super Hero as playable characters.
- DLC Pack 15/Hero of Justice Pack 2 - Includes Orange Piccolo, Piccolo (Power Awakening) and Gohan (Beast) from the 2022 film Dragon Ball Super: Super Hero as playable characters, the Red Ribbon Base (Yard) stage from DBS Super Hero, as well as three new expanded extra missions.
- DLC Pack 16/Future Saga: Chapter 1- Includes Broly (Restrained) from the 1993 film Dragon Ball Z: Broly – The Legendary Super Saiyan, and Android 18 (DB Super), Videl (DB Super), and a new version of Goku Black (Super Saiyan Rosé, Ultra Supervillain) and Vegeta (Super Saiyan God, Ultra Supervillain) as playable characters, as well as nine new expanded extra missions.
- DLC Pack 17/Future Saga: Chapter 2 - Includes Goku (Mini) from the 2024 anime Dragon Ball DAIMA, God of Destruction Belmod and Jiren (Full Power, Ultra Supervillain) as playable characters, A free trial update/campaign for this DLC started on Wednesday 20th November 2024. It fixed some bugs, increased the level cap from 140 - 160 and added Goku (Mini) as a free DLC character (for a limited amount of time only)
- DLC Pack 18/Dragon Ball DAIMA Pack - includes SS4 Goku (DAIMA) and SS3 Vegeta (DAIMA) from the 2024 anime Dragon Ball DAIMA as playable characters.
- DLC Pack 19/Future Saga: Chapter 3 - includes Broly (DB Super) and Golden Frieza (Ultra Supervillain) as playable characters.
- DLC Pack 20/Future Saga: Chapter 4 - includes Supreme Kai of Time (Ultra Supervillain) and Goku (Ultra Supervillain Quelled) as playable characters.

== Reception ==
Reception

Aggregate score
Aggregator	Score
Metacritic	PS4: 72/100; XONE: 73/100; PC: 78/100; NS: 75/100

Review scores
Publication	Score
Destructoid	PS4: 7.5/10
Famitsu	PS4: 33/40
Game Informer	PS4: 7/10
GameRevolution	3/5
GameSpot	PS4: 7/10
Hardcore Gamer	PS4: 3/5
HobbyConsolas	78%
IGN	PS4: 7.5/10
Nintendo Life	8/10
Nintendo World Report	9/10
Games Mojo	4.3/5
Trusted Reviews	3.5/5
PlayStation Universe	7/10
3DJuegos	8/10
Atomix	PS4: 74/100
Vandal	7.8/10

Dragon Ball Xenoverse 2 had shipped over 1.4 million copies worldwide. As of November 27, 2016, the PS4 version has sold 87,105 copies in Japan. The Nintendo Switch version debuted at number three on the Japanese sales charts, with 24,045 copies sold and later sold 500,000 copies worldwide, by 2018. Total sales reached over 5 million copies by the end of March 2019. Bandai Namco announced sales of 6 million copies sold worldwide in May 2020; over 7 million copies sold worldwide by December 2020; and over 10 million copies worldwide by May 2023.

Dragon Ball Xenoverse 2 received positive reviews. Critics praised the game's anime visual style, sound, and fighting gameplay but criticized the controls, repetitive nature and overall similarity to the previous installment. Aggregating review website Metacritic gave the PlayStation 4 version 72/100 based on 57 reviews.

IGN awarded it a score of 7.5 out of 10, saying, "Dragon Ball Xenoverse 2 is an ambitious, if rough-edged experience, with deceptively deep RPG and brawling elements." Hardcore Gamer awarded it 3 out of 5, calling it "a minimal improvement over its predecessor while sharing a lot of the same issues, but there's just something so endearing about how it all came together."

Heidi Kemps of GameSpot awarded the game a 7 out of 10, praising the combat and fan service, while criticizing the combat for being repetitive and the missions with a non-combat focus as "generally poor". Kyle Hilliard of Game Informer also awarded it a 7 out of 10, praising the addition of Conton City, but criticized the combat system for being almost identical to the first Xenoverse game and the soundtrack as "consistently awful".

Ashley Fonte from Games Mojo awarded it 4.3 out of 5 stars, stating that, "Dragon Ball Xenoverse 2 is an exciting anime game with a unique and ambitious concept that is familiar to the fans of the Dragon Ball Z series and will give them an enjoyable playing experience." Alastair Stevensons gave a score of 3.5/5 on Trusted Reviews, and said that "Combat is fun if you know how Dragon Ball works, but newbies will struggle to get their bearings, as Xenoverse 2's tuition system is, at best, hit-and-miss". "Smoother combat and great multiplayer options make Xenoverse 2 worth a play for fans of the series" was Benjamin Shillabeer-Hall's conclusion on PlayStation Universe, with a score of 7/10.
