= Dragon Ball Z: Resurrection 'F' =

2015 Japanese animated film

- Theatrical release poster
- Kanji: ドラゴンボールZ 復活の「F(エフ)」
- Revised Hepburn: Doragon Bōru Zetto Fukkatsu no 'Efu'
- Directed by: Tadayoshi Yamamuro
- Screenplay by: Akira Toriyama
- Based on: Dragon Ball by Akira Toriyama
- Produced by: Norihiro Hayashida; Rioko Tominaga
- Starring: see below
- Cinematography: Yosuke Motoki
- Edited by: Shinichi Fukumitsu
- Music by: Norihito Sumitomo
- Production company: Toei Animation
- Distributed by: Toei Company, Ltd.; 20th Century Fox Japan
- Release date: April 18, 2015 (Japan)
- Running time: 94 minutes
- Country: Japan
- Language: Japanese
- Budget: $5 million
- Box office: $61.7 million

Dragon Ball Z: Resurrection 'F' (Japanese: ドラゴンボールZ 復活の「F(エフ)」, Hepburn: Doragon Bōru Zetto Fukkatsu no 'Efu') is a 2015 Japanese animated science fantasy martial arts film and the sequel to Dragon Ball Z: Battle of Gods (2013). It is the nineteenth animated feature film based on the 1984–95 manga series Dragon Ball, the fifteenth to carry the Dragon Ball Z branding, and is the second film in the franchise to be personally supervised by series creator Akira Toriyama. The film's plot depicts the return of Frieza, who after his resurrection via the eponymous Dragon Balls, goes into extensive training with the purpose to enact his revenge against Goku.

The film was released theatrically on April 18, 2015. It is the first Japanese film to be screened in IMAX 3D and receive screenings at 4DX theaters. The film saw a limited theatrical release in North American theaters between August 4–13, 2015. Madman Entertainment released the film in Australia and New Zealand, where it ran in theaters between August 6–19, 2015. Manga Entertainment released the film in the United Kingdom and Ireland on September 30, 2015. The film received mostly positive reviews from critics, who praised the quality of animation and the fast-paced action sequences, although its plot received some criticism.

The film was later adapted into the second story arc of Dragon Ball Super, with the addition of extra scenes and subplots set before its events.

== Plot ==
The alien Sorbet, commander of the remnants of Frieza's military, travels to Earth where the Pilaf Gang are forced to collect and use the magical Dragon Balls to summon the wish-granting eternal dragon Shenron to resurrect Frieza. However, due to Frieza having been killed when Future Trunks chopped him up with his sword, (Note: As depicted in the Future Trunks arc in Dragon Ball) he is revived in many pieces which Sorbet's minions manage to reassemble using their advanced technology. Once restored and back in command of his forces, Frieza abuses some of his minions and plots revenge against the Super Saiyans. Upon learning that Goku has grown far more powerful over time, Frieza postpones the invasion so he can train himself for the first time.

Jaco the Galactic Patrolman travels to Earth to warn Bulma that Frieza is approaching and with Goku and Vegeta away training with Whis on Beerus' planet, Gohan, Piccolo, Krillin, Master Roshi, Tien Shinhan and Jaco assemble to resist Frieza's conquest and they fight and defeat thousands of his soldiers. Having greatly increased his power as a result of his training, Frieza overwhelms the warriors but Bulma is successful in making contact with Whis, notifying Goku and Vegeta of Frieza's return. The Saiyans return to Earth, rescue their allies, and face Frieza while Whis and Beerus watch on. Goku fights Frieza first and quickly gains the advantage but the latter deduces that he is holding back, so the two foes agree to fight at full power. Goku transforms into a new godly Super Saiyan form with a glowing blue hair and aura (later dubbed Super Saiyan Blue) and Frieza assumes his new gold-plated form, which he dubs Golden Frieza. Although Frieza initially gains the upper hand, Goku soon realizes that Frieza's energy drains quickly due to his lack of experience with the golden form.

Goku eventually bests Frieza in battle and gives him a chance to leave Earth, but this causes Frieza's rage to explode. Later, Goku is blasted in the chest by Sorbet's raygun when Frieza's guard is lowered. Frieza stands over the incapacitated Goku, and offers Vegeta a chance to kill him to become his second-in-command. Vegeta refuses, transforms into Super Saiyan Blue, and attacks Frieza. When Krillin attempts to revive Goku with a healing Senzu bean, Frieza attacks him, but Vegeta deflects the energy blast which subsequently kills Sorbet. Vegeta dominates Frieza who is humiliated and proceeds to launch a surprise energy blast into the Earth, destroying it and subsequently killing Vegeta. Goku, Beerus, and the others are shielded by Whis and left floating in space on a small patch of earth where they lament on the loss. Whis remarks that he can reverse time up to three minutes and, after doing so, Goku quickly kills Frieza with a Kamehameha much to Vegeta's anger.

In the aftermath, Goku and Vegeta discuss the assertion by Whis that, if the two of them were to properly learn to work together, opponents like Frieza would be defeated much easier. Vegeta scoffs and indicates that he would rather die than work with Goku, to which Goku humorously agrees. Vegeta remarks that it is about time they finally agree on something. In a post-credits scene, Frieza returns to Hell, and to his dismay, is welcomed back.

== Voice cast ==
Character (Note: In the closing credits, the English cast were listed with the characters' English names (e.g. Goku, Master Roshi, Krillin), while the Japanese cast were listed with Japanese names (e.g. Son Goku, Turtle Hermit, Kuririn).)	Japanese voice actor	English voice actor
Goku	Masako Nozawa	Sean Schemmel
Vegeta	Ryō Horikawa	Christopher R. Sabat
Freeza	Ryūsei Nakao	Frieza
Freeza	Ryūsei Nakao	Christopher Ayres
Gohan	Masako Nozawa	Kyle Hebert
Piccolo	Toshio Furukawa	Christopher R. Sabat
Kuririn	Mayumi Tanaka	Krillin
Kuririn	Mayumi Tanaka	Sonny Strait
Kame-Sennin	Masaharu Satō	Master Roshi
Kame-Sennin	Masaharu Satō	Mike McFarland
Tenshinhan	Hikaru Midorikawa	Tien Shinhan
Tenshinhan	Hikaru Midorikawa	John Burgmeier
Jaco	Natsuki Hanae	Todd Haberkorn
Sorbet (ソルベ, Sorube)	Shirō Saitō	Jeremy Schwartz
Tagoma (タゴマ)	Kazuya Nakai	Micah Solusod
Shisami (シサミ)	Tetsu Inada	Brad Venable
Beerus	Kōichi Yamadera	Jason Douglas
Whis	Masakazu Morita	Ian Sinclair
Bulma	Hiromi Tsuru	Monica Rial
Future Trunks	Takeshi Kusao	Eric Vale
Videl	Yuko Minaguchi	Kara Edwards
Dr. Briefs	Ryōichi Tanaka	Dr. Briefs
Dr. Briefs	Ryōichi Tanaka	Mark Stoddard
Android 18	Miki Itō	Meredith McCoy
Shenron	Ryūzaburō Ōtomo	Christopher R. Sabat
Pilaf	Shigeru Chiba	Chuck Huber
Mai	Eiko Yamada	Colleen Clinkenbeard
Shu	Tesshō Genda	Chris Cason
Marron	Hiroko Ushida	Tia Ballard

== Production ==
The film was originally announced in July 2014 under the tentative title of Dragon Ball Z 2015 in the September 2014 issue of V Jump magazine. The image of Son Goku in Super Saiyan form using the Shunkan Idō technique confirmed Akira Toriyama's credits for the original concept, screenplay and character designs and his mention that the film would be a continuation of his original manga. The author stated that the film will also be a sequel to Battle of Gods, that he strictly scrutinized all the dialogue, and promised more action scenes. A flyer of the same image, with a backside showing Shenlong, handed out at the Jump Victory Carnival event on July 19 revealed that Dragon Ball Z animation supervisor Tadayoshi Yamamuro is directing the new film. Later that month, a short teaser trailer was released of Shenlong bringing someone back to life with text calling this "The worst wish in history." (史上最悪の願い。), followed by Goku transforming into a Super Saiyan.

In November 2014, the film's Japanese title of Dragon Ball Z: Fukkatsu no F and basic plot outline were unveiled in the January 2015 issue of V Jump. A promotional image released for the film depicts Frieza, Goku, Vegeta, Piccolo, Son Gohan, Krillin, as well as the God of Destruction Beerus and Whis from the previous film Battle of Gods. Also featured in the image were two new characters that are servants of Frieza, Sorbet and Tagoma.

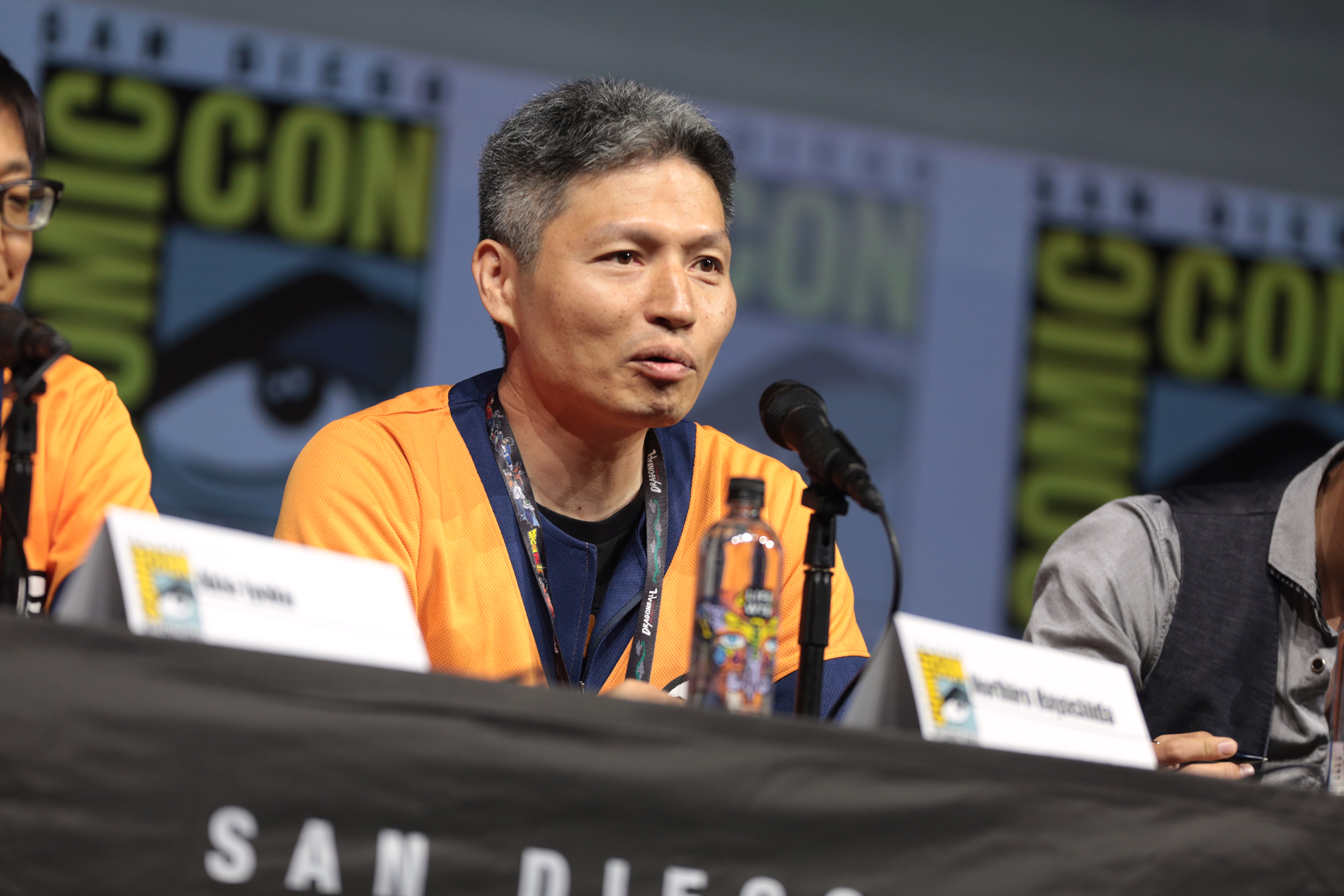
Producer Norihiro Hayashida

Producer Norihiro Hayashida said that although Toriyama came up with the story for Battle of Gods, its script was actually written by someone else. Therefore, Resurrection 'F' marks the first time the original creator wrote a screenplay for the series. He revealed that Toriyama had the idea to bring Frieza back while attending a concert by the metal band Maximum the Hormone. It came to him while watching them perform their 2008 song "F", which is about the fictional character. Hayashida also admitted that the team gave the film a fast pace by focusing on fight scenes for the American audience, which "may have caused some shortcomings on the dramatic level."

On December 5, 2014, the first full trailer for the film was aired on Fuji TV's morning show Mezamashi TV. The following day a slightly different trailer and a special audio message from Frieza (Ryūsei Nakao) were added to the film's official website, as well as some of the cast and crew. People who order advance tickets receive an earphone jack strap of either Goku or Frieza designed by Toriyama.

Momoiro Clover Z appeared with Masako Nozawa at a press conference in Tokyo on February 3, 2015, where it was announced that all five members will have roles in the film as "angels from hell." Costumed mascots of Son Goku and Frieza were also present at the event which was held on Setsubun, and accordingly beans were thrown at Frieza in the mamemaki tradition.

On March 2, 2015, a second full trailer was released for Resurrection 'F' revealing Frieza's new form, covering his skin in both gold and dark shades of purple. Other details included in the trailer were a defeated Gohan and Goku, Frieza's henchmen fighting against Piccolo, Tien Shinhan, Master Roshi and Krillin. It also features Jaco from Toriyama's 2013 manga series Jaco the Galactic Patrolman, which is set before Dragon Ball. A trailer featuring the series' heroes fighting Frieza and his 1,000-man army was released on March 24 by Mainichi Shimbun.

In April 2015, the 20th issue of Weekly Shōnen Jump revealed Goku's new form of the Super Saiyan God transformation he acquired in Battle of Gods. Toei released a short advertisement depicting Goku and Frieza fighting in their new forms, days before the magazine's official release.

=== Music ===
Like the previous film, the music in Resurrection 'F' was composed by Norihito Sumitomo. Its theme song is "Z no Chikai" (『Z』の誓い; "Pledge of Z") by the Japanese idol group, Momoiro Clover Z. A Toei producer said each member is a fan of the series. The song was released as a single on April 29, 2015, and includes a cover of Hironobu Kageyama's "Cha-La Head-Cha-La", the original opening theme of Dragon Ball Z. An English-language version of the song has also been recorded for use in international versions of the film. Maximum the Hormone's 2008 song "F" appears in the film during two different scenes. The film's original soundtrack, containing 32 tracks, was released on May 8, 2015.

== Marketing ==
In December 2014, Toho Cinemas collaborated with Resurrection 'F' for a television commercial promoting their Cinemileage Card. In it Frieza explains how the card program works and Goku's yelling of Frieza's name appears as a pun on the word "free."

A three-chapter manga adaptation of the film, drawn by Toyotarou, began in the April 2015 issue of V Jump.

As part of a collaboration with the J. League Division 1 football team Yokohama F. Marinos, a special poster with players mimicking the film's own was displayed in promotion of their matches with Vegalta Sendai on April 12 and Shonan Bellmare on April 25, 2015.

In March 2015, a collaboration between Toei Animation and Kirin Company spawned two dance parody commercials tying Resurrection 'F' with Kirin's Mets cola beverage, with the grape flavor advertisement featuring Frieza and his henchmen, and the orange flavor ad featuring Goku and the other heroes.

A collaboration with Curry House CoCo Ichibanya ran from April 1 to May 31, 2015. Anyone with a receipt of over ¥1,000 from one of the restaurants could send it in to enter a merchandise lottery, where they could win exclusive items such as shot glasses and a platter featuring Goku eating curry.

Frieza's new form from the film is a playable character in the video games Dragon Ball Heroes, Dragon Ball Zenkai Battle Royale, Dragon Ball Z: Extreme Butōden and Dragon Ball Xenoverse. Extreme Butōden also has Goku's new form from the film as a playable character and Vegeta's as an assist character. Along with Frieza's new form, the Super Saiyan God Super Saiyan forms of both Goku and Vegeta also appear as downloadable content in Dragon Ball Xenoverse.

The first 1.5 million filmgoers received a book called Dragon Ball Volume F (ドラゴンボール 巻「F」), which includes Toriyama's complete script for the film as well as design materials. They also got either a Goku or Vegeta card for the Dragon Ball Heroes arcade game and a certificate that gives them access to exclusive content for five different Dragon Ball video games. Like its prequel, the events of Resurrection 'F' were later adapted as the second story arc of Dragon Ball Super, with some events being altered or expanded in the series' version of events. The "Resurrection 'F'" arc covers episodes 15–27. An extended version of the film with new scenes titled Dragon Ball Z: Resurrection 'F' – Future Trunks Special Edition also aired on Fuji TV on August 27, 2016. The broadcast earned an average household rating of 9.2%. It serves as a prelude to the events of the Universe 6 Saga in Dragon Ball Super.

== Release ==
Resurrection 'F' opened in 658 2D and 3D theaters across Japan on April 18, 2015. It is the first Japanese film to be screened in IMAX 3D Digital theaters, shown in eighteen such establishments across the country. The previous film Battle of Gods was the first ever Japanese film to be shown at IMAX Digital theaters, but was not in 3D. It is also screened in ten 4DX theaters across Japan, which adds environmental effects such as seat motion, wind, rain and scents to the standard video and audio. Prior to its nationwide release, preview screenings were held in seven different cities for 2,264 winners of a lottery held amongst 24 different Shueisha magazines. The earliest four taking place on March 30, two more the following day, and the final two on April 2.

The film was planned to screen in 74 countries worldwide. On March 15, 2015, Funimation announced that it had licensed the film for North America and, together with Toei and 20th Century Fox, screened the subtitled film at Grauman's Egyptian Theatre in Los Angeles on April 11. The English dub, produced by Funimation, premiered at Regal LA Live Stadium 14 in Los Angeles, California, on July 2, 2015, during Anime Expo, while its theatrical release in North America was on August 4 for a limited run, initially ending on August 12, and then extended to August 17. It opened in Canada on Thursday, August 6. Madman Entertainment released the film in Australian theaters on August 6, both subtitled and dubbed in English, where it ran through until August 19, 2015. On July 26, 2015, at MCM Manchester Comic-Con, Manga Entertainment announced the release of the film in the United Kingdom in September 2015.

== Reception ==
=== Critical response ===
On review aggregator website Rotten Tomatoes, the film has a rating of 83%, based on 18 reviews, with an average rating of 6.3/10. Sam Leach of Anime News Network gave the film a B. Resurrection 'F' received a Silver Excellence Award at the 33rd Golden Gross Award and was nominated for Animation of the Year at the 39th Japan Academy Prize. Ryūsei Nakao won Best Voice Actor at the 25th Japanese Movie Critics Awards for his work on the film.

Critical response to the film was mixed. Shawn Saris of IGN awarded the film a score of 8 out of 10, saying "DBZ: Resurrection 'F' is a fast-paced film with tons of action and great animation, but lacks any meaningful punch." in regards Frieza's new powers and rivalry with Goku. Kotaku regarded Frieza as the series' most entertaining villain in the entire series which led to the staff to revive him multiple times in order to appeal to returning fans. While finding the film enjoyable, Kotaku still felt it was flawed as it "loses its momentum once the main battle begins and tension all but disappears" DVD Talk enjoyed the rematch between Frieza and Goku in Resurrection F but still lamented that its length was too much when compared with other subplots. Anime News Network lamented Frieza's role as he felt that he barely gave a decent fight in the film as the writing fails to portray him as a menacing villain with the new powers of Goku and Vegeta easily surpassing him alongside other plot devices like the healing beans. Den of Geek found the fight between Goku's allies and Frieza's army as the best part of the film in contrast to the lead's fights which he felt was "standard" to the point it gets "boring".

=== Box office ===
Dragon Ball Z: Resurrection 'F' opened at number one in the Japanese box office, earning approximately $8.1 million with 716,000 tickets sold in its first two days. It made 40.3% more and sold 27.4% more tickets than Battle of Gods did in its opening weekend. Deadline Hollywood reported that it had the biggest opening in Japan to that point for 2015, making Japan the only territory in the world where Furious 7 did not debut at number one. The film earned around $10.9 million by its sixth day and sold 1 million tickets by the end of its first week, making it the fastest film to reach that attendance number in Japan to that point in 2015. By May 6, 2015, it grossed 3.1 billion yen (approximately $25.9 million) on 2.36 million admissions, surpassing Battle of Gods in 19 days. The film was the sixth highest-grossing Japanese film at the Japanese box office in 2015, with ¥3.74 billion ($31.1 million).

In mid-June, the film debuted in Latin American markets grossing $7.11 million during its opening weekend. In the United States, it debuted with an $1.97 million opening from 895 theaters and grossed another $1.55 million the following day. In Australia, it made AUS $1.4 million by its second weekend of August 13–19. The film opened in Italy on September 11, 2015, and finished with a total weekend gross of €0.52 million (approximately US$0.6 million). In South Korea, the film grossed ₩176,019,000 ($155,610) in 2015.

Dragon Ball Z: Resurrection 'F' grossed a final total of $8 million in the United States and Canada. In other territories, the film grossed an estimated $53.7. By March 2016, the film has grossed ¥7.7 billion worldwide, including over ¥3.7 billion in Japan and ¥4.0 billion outside of Japan. By March 2019, the movie had a total worldwide gross of ¥7.9 billion.

== Home media ==
The film was released in Japan in standard and limited edition DVD and Blu-ray formats on October 7, 2015. The limited edition includes a story board book, booklet, and a Golden Freeza alarm clock, additionally each disc in this set includes bonus content as interviews, video footage from the May 9 "Goku Day" event, and much more. The home video release of Fukkatsu no 'F' sold approximately 41,442 copies in its first week. By the end of the year, it had sold 65,787 copies of both DVDs and Blu-rays.

On October 20, 2015, Funimation launched to North America three versions of the home video, the Collector's Edition, Blu-ray/DVD Combo and a standard DVD. As of February 2019, the DVD and Blu-ray releases have grossed over $8 million in US retail sales.

Madman Entertainment released the film in Australia and New Zealand on DVD and Blu-ray on November 18, 2015; In United Kingdom, Manga Entertainment released the DVD and Blu-ray on January 25, 2016.
