= Dragon Ball Xenoverse 3 =

2027 video game

- Developer: Dimps
- Publisher: Bandai Namco Entertainment
- Producer: Masayuki Hirano
- Series: Dragon Ball
- Platforms: Windows; PlayStation 5; Xbox Series X/S
- Release: 2027
- Genres: Fighting, role-playing
- Modes: Single-player, multiplayer

Dragon Ball Xenoverse 3 (Note: Japanese: ドラゴンボールゼノバース3, Hepburn: Doragon Bōru Zenobāsu Surī) is an upcoming action role-playing fighting game developed by Dimps and published by Bandai Namco Entertainment. It is a spin-off of the Dragon Ball franchise and the sequel to the 2016 video game Dragon Ball Xenoverse 2. It is set for release in 2027 on Windows, PlayStation 5, and Xbox Series X/S.

== Gameplay ==
The player character fires an energy blast at the targeted enemies during a battle with three teammates (two onscreen).

The gameplay of Dragon Ball Xenoverse 3 will be similar to previous Xenoverse titles, with a player-created character traversing through a central hub (in this case, West City), from which they can enter arenas based off locales in the Dragon Ball universe. The gameplay in these arenas is akin to a fighting game with role-playing elements. Several changes have been made to the gameplay from Xenoverse 2; for example, powerful techniques like energy blasts- which previously required the player to charge up their Ki Meter to use- can be performed freely, but will have a period of cooldown after use. The Ki Meter has been changed to a stamina meter. Xenoverse 3 also features the addition of two new abilities: Soul Assist, which will grant the player techniques used by Dragon Ball characters, and Soul Change, which allows the player to transform into certain characters, with their techniques having a lower cooldown than normal. The hub will also include side activities to partake in between battles.

== Plot ==
Set in the far future, Dragon Ball Xenoverse 3 follows the player character's recruitment into the Great Saiyan Squad, a force dedicated to maintaining peace in West City and the world over.

== Development ==
Dragon Ball Xenoverse 3 was announced by Bandai Namco during the Dragon Ball Games Battle Hour event in April 2026, with a planned release year of 2027. It is being developed by Dimps, the developer of the previous Xenoverse titles. Producer Masayuki Hirano stated in an interview that development is being split "about 50/50" between single-player and multiplayer, with a priority on implementing cross-play across all platforms. Dragon Ball creator Akira Toriyama designed characters and settings for Xenoverse 3, which Hirano claimed were a "guiding axis" for development. It is one of the last video games in the series with his involvement before his death in 2024.
