= Saikyō Jump =

Japanese bimonthly manga magazine by Shueisha

- Cover of the first issue of Saikyō Jump
- Editor-in-Chief: Naoki Kawashima
- Categories: Shōnen manga
- Frequency: Quarterly (2010–2011); Bimonthly (2014–2021); Monthly (2011–2014; 2021–present)
- Circulation: 86,667; (July–September 2026)
- First issue: December 3, 2010
- Company: Shueisha
- Country: Japan
- Language: Japanese
- Website: www.saikyojump.com

Saikyō Jump (Japanese: 最強ジャンプ, Hepburn: Saikyō Janpu; lit. 'Strongest Jump') is a Japanese monthly shōnen manga magazine published by Shueisha. The magazine was started on December 3, 2010, with three completely original titles and seven spin-off manga from series in Weekly Shōnen Jump and V Jump. Originally a quarterly magazine, Saikyō Jump became a monthly publication in December 2011, before switching to publishing once every 2 months with the November 2014 issue. It switched back to a monthly schedule with the September 2021 issue.

== Circulation ==
The magazine's mascot was created by Eiichiro Oda. Shueisha estimated that the vast majority of Saikyō Jump readers are elementary school aged children; 58.5% being upper elementary school aged, and 28% being lower elementary school aged.

Their main rival is CoroCoro Comic published by Shogakukan, also under the Hitotsubashi Group, with both doing collaborations in the kids program "OhaSuta" produced by Shogakukan-Shueisha Productions and TV Tokyo.

== Features ==
=== Current series ===
Series title	Author(s)	Premiere issue
Akuryou Kazoku (悪霊家族)	Nishiko	November 2025
Boku no Charaful Diary (僕のキャラフルダイアリー)	Battle Shigeki	March 2026
Digimon Eggs (デジモンエッグズ)	Ayumu Minato	October 2026
Dragon Ball SD (ドラゴンボールSD)	Naho Ōishi	January 2012
Dragon Ball Super Divers - Let's! Super Dive!! (ドラゴンボール スーパーダイバーズ -レッツ! スーパーダイブ!!-)	Yuuji Kasai	November 2024
Fire Emblem: Fortune's Weave (ファイアーエムブレム 万紫千紅)	Kazuro Kyou	September 2026
Ghost Catchers! (ゴーストキャッチャーズ！)	Kyou Ikeda	May 2026
Jigoku Sensei Nube Kai (地獄先生ぬ〜べ〜怪)	Shō Makura Takeshi Okano	May 2025
Kaiju No. 8: Relax (怪獣8号 RELAX)	Kizuku Watanabe	June 2024
Kaiten! Tokoyami Restaurant (怪店！トコヤミレストラン)	Tooru Sumiishi, Sukesuke Suke	June 2025
Kami no Oboshi Meshi! Gutto Natte Pekoru-chan (神のおぼしめし! グゥ~っと鳴ってペコルちゃん)	Katsuya Kazama, Ryou Yamori	August 2026
Negacho (ネガッチョ)	Joukei Andou	April 2025
One Piece Gakuen (ワンピース学園, Wan Pīsu Gakuen)	Souhei Kouji	August 2019
Oshiri Dandy: The Young (おしりダンディ ザ・ヤング)	Robinson Haruhara, Akihiro Kikuchi	May 2020
Sakamoto Holidays (SAKAMOTO HOLIDAYS)	Tetsu Ookawa	July 2024
Sudate Hinagarasu (巣立てヒナガラス)	Retsu	January 2026
Taro (TARO)	Hiroshi Otoki	February 2026
Tensai Shimai (天才姉妹)	Nuu Imai	September 2026
Tsumugi no Mahou (ツムギの魔縫)	Naoki Iwamoto	August 2024
Wakusei Onee-chan Monika (惑星お姉ちゃんモニカ)	Yuusuke Matsumoto	November 2026

=== YouTube series ===
Series title	Author(s)	Premiere issue
Captain Tsubasa: Boys Dream (キャプテン翼 BOYS DREAM)	Kunikazu Toda	May 2024
Dragon Ball SD (ドラゴンボールSD)	Naho Ōishi	January 2012
Fischer's x One Piece: 7-tsunagi no Daihihou (Fischer's×ONE PIECE 7つなぎの大秘宝)	Semimaro Aburakouji	September 2018

=== Former series ===
Series title	Author(s)	Premiere issue	Final issue
Black Clover SD Asta-kun's Road to Magic Emperor (ブラッククローバーSD アスタくん魔法帝への道)	Setta Kobayashi	February 2018	April 2021
Boruto: Saikyo Dash Generations (BORUTO-ボルト- SAIKYO DASH GENERATIONS)	Kenji Taira	May 2017	April 2021
Daimonji to Mondaiji (大門寺と問題児)	Tarou Sasebo	August 2022	February 2026
Dragon Ball Discross Jinryoku God Max!! (ドラゴンボールディスクロス神力ゴッドMAX!!)	Katsuki Hirose	May 2015	November 2016
Dragon Ball Fusions the Manga!! (ドラゴンボールフュージョンズ the MANGA!!)	Hiroshi Otoki	May 2016	May 2018
Dragon Ball GT Anime Comic (ドラゴンボールGT アニメコミック)	Toei Animation, Akira Toriyama, Bird Studio, Shueisha	December 2013	July 2023
Dragon Ball Heroes: Super Charisma Mission! (ドラゴンボールヒーローズ 超（スーパー）カリスマミッション!)	Yoshitaka Nagayama	April 2014	July 2016
Dragon Quest: Dai no Daibouken - Xross Blade (ドラゴンクエストダイの大冒険 クロスブレイド)	Yoshikazu Amami	November 2020	January 2024
Fire Emblem Engage (ファイアーエムブレム エンゲージ)	Kazuro Kyou	February 2023	June 2026
Gourmet Academy Toriko (グルメ学園トリコ)	Toshinori Takayama, Akitsugu Mizumoto	January 2012	January 2017
I'm From Japan (ジモトがジャパン)	Seiji Hayashi	September 2018	April 2020
Kabushiki Gaisha 5-nen 1-kumi (株式会社5年1組)	Hideo Shinkai	April 2024	March 2026
Kamome no Kenjutsu (かめもの剣術)	Tomoto	October 2025	August 2026
Ki ni naru ano ko wa kaeru suki (気になるあの子はカエル好き)	Yuusuke Matsumoto	September 2023	November 2025
Kimetsu Gakuen! (キメツ学園!)	Natsuki Hokami	August 2021	March 2024
Koro-sensei Q! (殺せんせーQ!)	Kizuku Watanabe, Jou Aoto	November 2015	November 2019
Mitsuru Quest (ミツルクエスト)	Shinichirou Ooe	July 2023	June 2025
Monster Strike: Burst Fantasista (モンスターストライク バーストファンタジスタ)	Ryou Yamori	May 2023	April 2024
My Hero Academia: Team-Up Missions (僕のヒーローアカデミア チームアップミッション)	Yōkō Akiyama	August 2019	January 2025
Ojarumaru (おじゃる丸)	Tatsuma Ejiri (story and art), Rin Inumaru (original creator)	January 2012	September 2014
One Piece Party (ワンピースパーティー, Wan Pīsu Pātī)	Ei Andō	January 2015	February 2021
Rock Lee no Seishun Full-Power Ninden (ロック・リーの青春フルパワー忍伝)	Kenji Taira	January 2012	September 2014
Sand Land Full Color	Akira Toriyama	September 2023	September 2024
///SCAR-LET/// (スカーレット)	Setta Kobayashi, Ayumi Nakashima	July 2025	June 2026
Shinkalion Dive the World (シンカリオン ダイブ ザ ワールド)	Mashino Sawazaki, Kou Furuya	April 2024	April 2025
Sōsei no Onmyōji: SD Nyoritsuryō!! (双星の陰陽師 SD如律令!!)	koppy, Yoshiaki Sukeno	May 2016	March 2017
Spider-Man: Kizuna (スパイダーマン：絆)	Setta Kobayashi, Hachi Mizuno	October 2023	June 2025
Super Dragon Ball Heroes: Avatars!! (SDBHアバターズ!!)	Yuuji Kasai	August 2021	September 2024
Super Dragon Ball Heroes: Dark Demon Realm Mission!! (スーパードラゴンボールヒーローズ 暗黒魔界ミッション！！)	Yoshitaka Nagayama	September 2016	March 2018
Super Dragon Ball Heroes: Meteor Mission! (スーパードラゴンボールヒーローズ メテオミッション!)	Yoshitaka Nagayama	November 2023	October 2024
Super Dragon Ball Heroes: Ultimate Charisma Mission!! (スーパードラゴンボールヒーローズ 極（アルティメット）カリスマミッション!!)	Yoshitaka Nagayama	March 2017	February 2020
Super Dragon Ball Heroes: Universe Mission!! (スーパードラゴンボールヒーローズ ユニバースミッション!!)	Yoshitaka Nagayama	April 2018	February 2020
Uchiha Sasuke no Sharingan Den (うちはサスケの写輪眼伝)	Kenji Taira	November 2014	May 2017
Unlucky Fukouda-sensei (アンラッキー不幸田先生)	Kazumata Oguri	May 2022	March 2025
Yu-Gi-Oh! Arc-V The Strongest Duelist Yuya!! (遊☆戯☆王 ARC-V 最強デュエリスト遊矢！！)	Akihiro Tomonaga	May 2015	September 2017
Yu-Gi-Oh! D Team ZEXAL (遊☆戯☆王 Dチーム ゼアル)	Akihiro Tomonaga	May 2012	May 2014
Yu-Gi-Oh! Go Rush!! (遊戯王ゴーラッシュ!!)	Naoya Sugita, Masahiro Hikokubo	April 2022	March 2024
Yu-Gi-Oh! Rush Duel LP (遊☆戯☆王 ラッシュデュエル LP)	Akihiro Tomonaga	September 2021	September 2022
