= Dragon Ball Fusions =

2016 video game

- North American cover art
- Developer: Ganbarion
- Publisher: Bandai Namco Entertainment
- Series: Dragon Ball
- Platform: Nintendo 3DS
- Release: JP: August 4, 2016; NA: November 22, 2016; PAL: February 17, 2017
- Genre: Role-playing
- Mode: Single-player

Dragon Ball Fusions (Note: Japanese: ドラゴンボールフュージョンズ) is a role-playing video game for the Nintendo 3DS, based on the Dragon Ball franchise. It was released in Japan on August 4, 2016 with a localized version being released in North America on November 22, 2016. Dragon Ball Fusions was released in Europe, the Middle East, and Australasian territories on February 17, 2017.

== Gameplay ==
Dragon Ball Fusions allows players to create their own character, build teams, and collect Dragon Ball characters to fuse and create new ones to use during battles. It also allows players to take a photograph of themselves or their friends and fuse them.

== Plot ==
"Dragon ball fusions" plot starts of with a create a character, where the player can choose between human, Saiyan, Alien, Offworlder(a Majin like humanoid from the demon realm), and Namekian. The player finds their friend, and rival, Pinich asleep. The player has the choice to either tell him to wake up, or tap him on the shoulder to wake him up. After he's woken up, the two use the dragon balls to wish for " a tournament with the strongest fighters from around the world". After this wish occurs, a rift opens up, and the two are taken to a world floating, and the world is seemingly a mashup of the dragon ball locations capsule corporation, and Mount Pazou. The game gives a quick tutorial on the mechanic of flying around the map, before you're forced into your first battle with Natz. A fusion between Nappa, and Raditz. Afterwards, you meet Goten, and Trunks, and are taken to Capsule corporation headquarters. Trunks' mother, Bulma gives the player the Time space radar(named Ziku). It works similar to the dragon radar, except it also allows you to search for "Time space rifts". After this encounter, the player recruits Goten, and Trunks.

Goten and Trunks are now treated as knowledgeable guides, who often give the player information about enemies(although, not as helpful as the Time space radar Ziku). After the first few tutorials, Kid Goku from Akira Toriyama's original Dragon ball appears from one of the rifts. Afterwards, a larger "barrier" appears at the very top of the area, and the player breaks through it.

After breaking through the barrier, the player and their group are taken to a new floating area, this time the floating area looks like a combination of Planet Namek, and Hercule city. Ziku informs the player that each fighter gives off one of five "energy" Blue for human, red for Saiyan, yellow for alien, green for namekian, and purple for offworlder. Trunks' and Goten lead the player to a small area reminiscent of King Kai's planet, with a barrier around it. After the player obtains the sufficient amount of energy, they are able to break through the barrier. After breaking through the barrier, they enter King kai's planet, who tells the player that every time you defeat an enemy of one of the five types, they may give some energy, and the more of one type of ally you have, the more of each energy can be held(up to 999 energy for each color).

After this run in with King Kai, Ziku detec

== Development ==
=== North American localization ===
In the game's North American release, all swords in the game had been replaced with sticks. Though no explanation as to why this change was made, a representative of Bandai Namco told Operation Rainfall that the decision was made by Nintendo and Bandai Namco.

== Manga ==
A manga adaptation titled Dragon Ball Fusions the Manga!! (Note: Japanese: ドラゴンボールフュージョンズ the MANGA!!) was serialized in Saikyō Jump magazine from its May 2016 issue published in April 2016 to its May 2018 issue published in April 2018. Written and illustrated by Hiroshi Otoki, the story followed Tekka as he and his friend Pinich gather the Dragon Balls to wish for a "Number One in Time Space Martial Arts Tournament."

== Reception ==
Reception

Aggregate score
Aggregator	Score
Metacritic	72/100

Review scores
Publication	Score
Destructoid	6/10
Famitsu	33/40
Game Informer	6.75/10
GameSpot	6/10
Nintendo Life	8/10
Nintendo World Report	7.5/10
HobbyConsolas	78%
Slant Magazine	4/5
3DJuegos	8/10
Atomix	75/100
MeriStation	7.5/10
Vandal	7.5/10

The game received "mixed" reviews, according to the review aggregator website Metacritic, receiving a rating of 72/100 based on 37 critics.

Kyle Hilliard of Game Informer awarded Dragon Ball Fusions a 6.75 out of 10, praising the gameplay and graphics while criticizing the battles and requirements for EX Fusions as "time-consuming".

Heidi Kemps of GameSpot awarded the game a 6 out of 10, criticizing the lack of English voice acting, the battle animations for being "repetitive" and the game itself for feeling like a companion to Dragon Ball Xenoverse.

The game sold 77,509 copies within its first week of release in Japan. As of October 13, 2016, it has sold 174,184 copies in the region. By 2018, it had sold 240,568 copies in Japan.
