= Dragon Ball (manga) =

Japanese manga series by Akira Toriyama

- First tankōbon volume cover, featuring Son Goku above Shenlong

ドラゴンボール (Doragon Bōru)
- Genre: Adventure; Fantasy comedy; Martial arts
- Manga
- Written by: Akira Toriyama
- Published by: Shueisha
- English publisher: AUS: Madman Entertainment; NA/UK: Viz Media
- Imprint: Jump Comics
- Magazine: Weekly Shōnen Jump
- English magazine: NA: Weekly Shonen Jump; Shonen Jump
- Original run: November 20, 1984 – May 23, 1995
- Volumes: 42
- Anime television series
- Dragon Ball (1986–1989); Dragon Ball Z (1989–1996); Dragon Ball Z Kai (2009–2015)
- Midquel
- Dragon Ball Super (2015–present)
- Media franchise
- List of Dragon Ball series; List of Dragon Ball films; List of Dragon Ball video games; List of Dragon Ball soundtracks
- icon

Dragon Ball (Japanese: ドラゴンボール, Hepburn: Doragon Bōru) is a Japanese manga series written and illustrated by Akira Toriyama. Originally serialized in Shueisha's shōnen manga magazine Weekly Shōnen Jump from 1984 to 1995, the 519 individual chapters were collected in 42 tankōbon volumes. The story follows the adventures of Son Goku, from childhood to adulthood, as he trains in martial arts and explores the world in search of the Dragon Balls, seven magical orbs which summon a wish-granting dragon when gathered. Along his journey, Goku makes several friends and battles villains, many of whom also seek the Dragon Balls. Dragon Ball was inspired by the Chinese novel Journey to the West and Hong Kong martial arts films. It initially had a comedy focus but later became an action-packed fighting series.

The original manga was adapted into three anime series produced by Toei Animation: Dragon Ball and Dragon Ball Z, which were broadcast in Japan from 1986 to 1996, and Dragon Ball Z Kai, a recut and remastered version of Z which was broadcast in Japan from 2009 to 2015. The series spawned a wider media franchise; among merchandise, there have been animated sequel and midquel series, both animated and live-action films, collectible trading card games, action figures, collections of soundtracks, and numerous video games. The series was licensed for an English-language release in North America and the United Kingdom by Viz Media, and in Australia and New Zealand by Madman Entertainment. The companies initially split the manga into two parts, Dragon Ball and Dragon Ball Z to match the anime series, but the most recent edition of the series was released in full under its original title.

Dragon Ball became one of the most successful manga series of all time. Its initial serialization in Weekly Shōnen Jump was partly responsible for the magazine reaching its highest circulation of 6.53 million weekly sales. Its collected tankōbon volumes have 160 million copies sold in Japan and 260 million sold worldwide, making it one of the best-selling manga series of all time. Reviewers have praised the manga for its comedy, fight scenes, and pacing, while recognizing a coming-of-age theme and its use of cultural references from Chinese mythology and Japanese folktales. Complaints from parents in the United States resulted in English-language releases being edited to remove nudity, racial stereotypes, and other content.

Also regarded as one of the most influential manga series, Dragon Ball has inspired numerous manga artists, including Eiichiro Oda (One Piece), Masashi Kishimoto (Naruto), and Tite Kubo (Bleach). A midquel series, titled Dragon Ball Super, has been published in V Jump since 2015. It was written by Toriyama and illustrated by Toyotarou.

== Plot summary ==
Son Goku, a monkey-tailed boy, and Bulma, a teenage girl, travel to find the seven Dragon Balls, which summon the dragon Shenlong to grant the user one wish. Their journey leads to the shapeshifter Oolong; the desert bandit Yamcha, who later becomes an ally; Chi-Chi, whom Goku unknowingly agrees to marry; and Pilaf, an impish man who seeks the Dragon Balls to fulfill his desire to rule the world. Pilaf gathers the Dragon Balls, but Oolong stops his wish from being granted. Goku undergoes rigorous training regimes under the martial arts master Kame-Sen'nin to fight in the Tenka'ichi Budōkai (天下一武道会; lit. 'Strongest Under the Heavens Martial Arts Tournament'). He becomes friends with a monk named Kuririn, his training partner and initial rival. After losing the tournament to Kame-Sen'nin, Goku searches for the Dragon Ball his grandfather left him and almost single-handedly defeats the Red Ribbon Army and their hired assassin, Taopaipai. Goku then reunites with his friends to defeat the fortune teller Baba Uranai's fighters and use her to find the last Dragon Ball held by Pilaf in order to revive a friend killed by Taopaipai.

Three years later at the Tenka'ichi Budōkai, Goku and his allies oppose Kame-Sen'nin's rival and Taopaipai's brother, Tsuru-Sen'nin, and his students Tenshinhan and Chaozu. Tenshinhan, the winner of that year's tournament, and Chaozu reject their former master and their old assassin ways. Kuririn is killed after the tournament; Goku tracks down the murderer's leader, the Great Demon King Piccolo, but is defeated. The samurai Yajirobe takes Goku to the hermit Karin, who heals him and gives him a power boost. Meanwhile, Kame-Sen'nin and Chaozu die in battle against Piccolo. Piccolo uses the Dragon Balls to regain his youth and then destroys Shenlong. Goku then kills the Great Demon King Piccolo, who, before dying, spawns his son/reincarnation Piccolo. Karin then directs Goku to Kami, the original creator of the Dragon Balls and the Great Demon King Piccolo's other half, to restore Shenlong and revive Goku's slain friends. Goku trains under Kami for the next three years, once again reuniting with his friends at the Tenka'ichi Budōkai. There, he defeats Piccolo, whose life he spares as it would also kill Kami and Shenlong. Goku leaves with Chi-Chi to keep his promise to marry her.

Five years later, Goku is a young adult and father to a son, Gohan. A man named Raditz arrives on Earth, identifies Goku as his younger brother Kakarrot, and reveals to him that they are members of a nearly extinct extraterrestrial race called the Saiyans (サイヤ人, Saiya-jin), who sent Goku to conquer Earth for them; however, Goku had suffered a severe head injury as an infant and lost all memories of his mission. Goku refuses to continue the mission, and sides with Piccolo to kill Raditz at the cost of his own life. In the afterlife, Goku trains under the Lord of the Northern Worlds, until he is revived by the Dragon Balls to save the Earth from the invading Saiyans Nappa and Vegeta a year after his death. Goku and his friends defeat the Saiyans; Goku asks Kuririn to spare Vegeta's life so he can have a rematch. In the battle, Yamcha, Chaozu, Tenshinhan, and Piccolo are killed, and the Dragon Balls cease to exist. Kuririn and the galactic tyrant Freeza learn of another set of Dragon Balls on the planet Namek (ナメック星, Namekku-sei), Piccolo's homeworld. Bulma, Gohan, and Kuririn search for them to revive their friends and thus restore Earth's Dragon Balls, while Vegeta and Freeza are searching for them to have their wishes of immortality granted. Vegeta and Goku later stand alongside Gohan and Kuririn to fight Freeza and his team of mercenaries, the Ginyu Force. The long battle with Freeza ends when Goku transforms into a legendary Super Saiyan (超サイヤ人, Sūpā Saiya-jin) and defeats him. The wish of bringing Goku's friends back to life is granted by Namek's version of Shenlong, Porunga. Barely surviving, Freeza recovers and goes to Earth to take his revenge on Goku; however, he is killed by a Super Saiyan from the future named Trunks.

Three years later, a group of Androids (人造人間, Jinzōningen; lit. 'Artificial Humans') created by a member of the former Red Ribbon Army, Doctor Gero, appears, seeking revenge against Goku. During this time, an evil life form also created by Gero called Cell emerges and, after absorbing two of the Androids to achieve his "perfect form", holds his own fighting tournament to challenge the protagonists. After Goku sacrifices his own life to no avail, Gohan avenges his father by killing Cell. Seven years later, Goku—revived for one day to compete in the Tenka'ichi Budōkai again—and his allies are drawn into a fight against Boo the Djinn. After many battles, including the destruction and re-creation of the Earth, and Goku's proper resurrection, Goku destroys Boo with a Genki-Dama (a sphere of pure energy drawn from all intelligent beings on Earth), and wishes for him to be reincarnated as a "good guy". Ten years later, at the Tenka'ichi Budōkai, Goku meets Boo's human reincarnation, Oob. After testing his powers, Goku departs with Oob to train him to be the Earth's new protector.

== Production ==
=== Writing ===
Within roughly six months of creating the popular manga Dr. Slump in 1980, Akira Toriyama wanted to end the series but his publisher Shueisha would only allow him to do so if he agreed to start another serial for them shortly after. He worked with his editor, Kazuhiko Torishima, on several one-shots but none were successful. Torishima then suggested that, as Toriyama enjoyed kung fu films, he should create a kung fu shōnen manga. He was inspired by Hong Kong martial arts films such as Bruce Lee's Enter the Dragon (1973) and Jackie Chan's Drunken Master (1978). He was particularly influenced by the fight scenes in Jackie Chan movies, and said he would never have come up with Dragon Ball if he had not watched Drunken Master, which he enjoyed partly due to its light-hearted tone. This led to the two-part Dragon Boy, published in the August and October 1983 issues of Fresh Jump. It follows a boy, adept at martial arts, who escorts a princess on a journey back to her home country. Dragon Boy was very well-received and evolved to become the serial Dragon Ball.

The plot and characters of Dragon Ball were loosely modeled on the classic Chinese novel Journey to the West, with Goku being Sun Wukong ("Son Goku" in Japanese), Bulma as Tang Sanzang, Oolong as Zhu Bajie, and Yamcha being Sha Wujing. Toriyama wanted to create a story with the basic theme of Journey to the West, but with "a little kung fu" by combining the novel with elements from the kung fu films of Jackie Chan and Bruce Lee. Torishima said he chose the novel largely because it was a free intellectual property, but also because its Chinese setting was not common in manga at the time and would make it both unique and differentiate it from Dr. Slump's US West Coast feel.

He changed the objective from Journey to the West, where the protagonists travel through the Western Regions (Central Asia) to collect sacred Buddhist texts from the Indian subcontinent, to something simpler, gathering seven orbs which grant a wish. Toriyama added the idea of the Dragon Balls to give the characters a game-like activity of gathering something in order to appeal to its shōnen manga magazine audience. His concept of the Dragon Balls was inspired by the epic Japanese novel Nansō Satomi Hakkenden (1814–1842), which involves the heroes collecting eight large Buddhist prayer beads of a necklace from eight different regions of Japan, which Toriyama adapted into finding seven Dragon Balls from seven different locations; he chose the number seven to avoid being the same as the number of beads in Hakkenden. The title Dragon Ball was inspired by Enter the Dragon as well as later Bruceploitation knockoff kung fu movies which frequently had the word "Dragon" in the title. He originally thought the story would last about a year, or end once the Dragon Balls were collected. Toriyama said that although the stories are purposefully easy to understand, he specifically aimed Dragon Ball at an older audience than Dr. Slump.

The manga was not popular initially. Although he suspected the fighting genre would appeal more to its shōnen audience, Toriyama tried to stick to the Journey to the West adventure aspect which he himself enjoyed, such as having the setting change each chapter, different enemies popping up, and different locations. It was only after he became tired of Torishima nagging about its popularity that Toriyama gave in and developed more battles with the first shown Tenkaichi Budōkai. Despite his reluctance, the author said it felt good when the series picked up in popularity at that point. However, he said he still tried to resist by returning to the adventure aspect with the Red Ribbon Army arc, and visiting Penguin Village from Dr. Slump to add comedy. When that did not work out, fighting became the main theme for the manga.

Toriyama said that by the second half of the series, he had become more interested in coming up with the story than drawing it, and that the battles became more intense by him simplifying the lines. He also said he would get letters from readers complaining that the art had become "too square", so he intentionally made it more so. Years later he stated that because Dragon Ball is an action manga the most important aspect is the sense of speed, so he did not draw very elaborately, suggesting that he was not interested in the art. As the manga progressed, Toriyama struggled with the Android and Cell arc, feeling that he could not outdo the Freeza arc. He added time travel, but said he had a hard time with the plot, only being able to think of what to do that week. After Cell's death, Toriyama intended for Gohan to replace Goku as the series' protagonist, but felt the character was not suited for it and changed his mind. Even after the Cell arc, Toriyama felt it could not end there and so continued to the Boo arc. Having resolved it would be the finale, he decided to draw what he wanted and inserted comedy with Gohan's Great Saiyaman persona and the character Gotenks. However, he did not think of an ending until the final chapter. At the time, Toriyama said he gave Dragon Ball a low-key ending to make it seem as if the story might continue, but he would later say he skipped 10 years ahead in the story to signal that it was truly the end. Wanting to make it even clearer that Goku's battles were over and a new generation was taking over, Toriyama slightly altered the ending for the kanzenban edition of Dragon Ball, which finished in 2004.

=== Development ===
Typically, when creating a manga chapter, an artist draws a rough draft or "name", then a more detailed storyboard, and lastly the finalized version. However, Toriyama only drew a storyboard and then the final product simply because it is less work. He did not plan the details of his stories in advance. When he began the serialization of Dragon Ball, he had only prepared storyboards for three chapters. The author said that during its serialization he would wait about two days before his deadline to begin developing the storyboard. Starting around midnight, he would finish it around six in the morning and spend until that night inking, finishing everything in about a day-and-a-half. Unlike other artists, he had only one assistant helping him. Toriyama said that thinking only about the story for each chapter put him in some tight spots, particularly with Trunks' time travel. The only thing he had confidence in is his ability to connect a story back to an earlier aspect, making it seem to have been foreshadowing. The author used suggestions in fan mail he received, though generally doing the opposite of what was suggested. As an example, many fans told him not to kill Vegeta, which is exactly what he did.

Wanting to escape the Western themes that influenced Dr. Slump, Toriyama used Eastern/Oriental scenery in Dragon Ball. In addition to referencing Chinese buildings and scenery, the island where the Tenkaichi Budōkai is held is modeled on Bali (in Indonesia), which he visited in 1985. The area around Bobbidi's spaceship was inspired by photos of Africa. When including fights in the manga, Toriyama had the characters go to uninhabited locations to avoid the difficulties of drawing residents and destroyed buildings. Toriyama wanted to set Dragon Ball in a fictional world largely based on Asia, taking inspiration from several Asian cultures including Japanese, Chinese, South Asian, Central Asian, Arabic, and Indonesian cultures. Toriyama was also inspired by the jinn (genies) from The Arabian Nights. For the training scenes, Jackie Chan's Drunken Master served as a reference. The author said that Muscle Tower in the Red Ribbon Army storyline was inspired by the beat 'em up video game Spartan X (called Kung-Fu Master in the West), in which enemies appear very fast as the player ascends a tower (the game was in turn inspired by Jackie Chan's Wheels on Meals and Bruce Lee's Game of Death), and that the fights were similar to the ones in the Tenkaichi Budōkai, just not in a tournament setting.

Toriyama personally disliked the idea of naming fighting techniques, joking that in a real fight you would be killed before you could yell their names, but Torishima felt it would be best. Toriyama proceeded to create names for all the techniques, except for the series' signature Kamehameha (かめはめ波(かめはめは); lit. 'Kamehame Wave') which his wife came up with when he was indecisive about what it should be called. He even selected them specifically for each character, saying someone like Vegeta would use English names, and using kanji for the more sophisticated like Piccolo.

In order to advance the story quickly by having characters travel without inconvenience, he created the flying cloud Kinto-un (筋斗雲(きんとうん); lit. 'Somersault Cloud'), then gave most fighters the flying technique Bukū-jutsu (舞空術(ぶくうじゅつ); lit. 'Air Dance Technique'), and granted Goku the teleportation ability Shunkan Idō (瞬間移動(しゅんかんいどう); lit. 'Instant Teleport'). While talking to his long-time friend and fellow manga artist Masakazu Katsura about how there was nothing stronger than a Super Saiyan, Katsura suggested having two characters "fuse" together, leading to the creation of the Fusion (フュージョン, Fyūjon) technique.

Toriyama enjoyed designing and drawing the distinctive machines of the series. He found the most fun in designing original mecha, thinking about how a pilot enters and where the engine is. With real world items he would have to look at references, and being off even a little would be noticeable. He went against whatever was popular at the time, explaining that when he was creating Dragon Ball, most cars were very square, so he drew only round car designs.

In 1995, Toriyama detailed the equipment he used for Dragon Ball. He used a G-pen nib by Zebra, usually getting three chapters out of one because he typically did not press down hard. Toriyama used black drawing ink made by Pilot, but his color ink was produced by Luma and applied with a ten-year-old fine point Tenshōdō brush. His whiteout was also made by Luma. He received free Kent paper, similar to Bristol board, from a seller connected to Shueisha, and used a 0.5mm 2B lead mechanical pencil and a wide ruler at least 30 cm long.

==== Characters ====
When creating a character, his process was to draw their face and body type first, and then the clothes, while thinking if the fighters can move around in them. He said that he did not draw "bad guys" so unscrupulous that it affected readers psychologically. This is not out of concern for others, but because he did not enjoy drawing such things. Few of his characters have screentone because he found it difficult to use. Toriyama was not concerned about consistency with the color of characters' clothes for the occasional color pages, having sometimes used different ones than he had before. He even specifically asked Torishima to produce as few color pages as possible. Character names are almost always puns sharing a theme with characters related to them, most commonly food. For example, all Saiyans are named after vegetables, saiya (サイヤ) being an anagram of the syllables for yasai (野菜) which means vegetable; such as Kakarrot (カカロット, Kakarotto) taken from carrot (キャロット, kyarotto).

Going against the normal convention that the strongest characters should be the largest in terms of physical size, he designed many of Dragon Ball's most powerful characters, including Goku, with small statures. Toriyama explained that he had Goku grow up so that drawing fight scenes would be easier, even though Torishima was against it initially because it was rare to have the main character of a manga series change drastically. Torishima later referred to this as his own biggest crisis during the series, with Toriyama threatening to end it if Goku could not grow up. The editor said his concerns were unfounded, as readers accepted the change without complaint.

Having created the Great Demon King Piccolo as the first truly evil villain, he said that his part of the series was the most interesting to draw. Freeza was created around the time of the Japanese economic bubble and inspired by real estate speculators, who Toriyama called the "worst kind of people". Yū Kondō, Toriyama's second editor, from the Saiyan arc until the appearance of Perfect Cell, and Fuyuto Takeda, his third editor from Perfect Cell until the end of the series, said that Dragon Ball hit its peak in popularity during the Freeza arc. In a one-thousand ballot popularity poll held in Weekly Shōnen Jump, Dragon Ball received 815 votes. Finding the escalating enemies difficult, Toriyama created the Ginyu Force to add more balance to the manga.

When Toriyama created the Super Saiyan transformation during the Freeza arc, he gave Goku blond hair because it was easier to draw for Toriyama's assistant, who spent a lot of time blacking in Goku's hair. He also gave him piercing eyes, based on Bruce Lee's paralyzing glare.

== Publication ==
=== Japanese publication ===
Dragon Ball was serialized in Shueisha's shōnen manga anthology Weekly Shōnen Jump from November 20, 1984, to May 23, 1995. (Note: It started in the magazine's 51st issue of 1984 (cover date December 3), and finished in its 25th issue of 1995 (cover date June 5).) As the readership of Dragon Ball grew up, the magazine changed to reflect their changing interests. The 519 individual chapters were collected in 42 tankōbon volumes by Shueisha from September 10, 1985, through August 4, 1995. These saw any color or partly colored artwork grayscaled. With their predominantly white color and the singular picture that continues across their various spines, Torishima said the covers to these collected volumes were purposely designed to stick out on store bookshelves. For the series' 24th anniversary, the tankōbon covers were revamped to a design that has been used on all reprints since 2009. Between December 4, 2002, and April 2, 2004, Dragon Ball was released in a collection of 34 kanzenban volumes that retain the color artwork from its Weekly Shōnen Jump run. It received newly drawn cover illustrations by Toriyama, and each volume included a poster of their respective front cover image. These new illustrations were initially drawn in ink, scanned into a computer and colored using Corel Painter. Midway through, Toriyama changed to drawing them on a graphics tablet and coloring them with Adobe Photoshop. UV curing was used to add "shine" to the characters, and some characters are in monochrome up until volume 18. The kanzenban edition was designed by Hideaki Shimada. Although Toriyama had already drafted the first four covers with a vibrant green, Shimada proposed bright red after seeing South Korea compete in the 2002 FIFA World Cup and he agreed. Wanting a "neater" look than the tankōbon, Shimada decided to write "Dragonball" in lowercase and in a taller and thinner font. He also asked Toriyama to draw Shenlong with thick lines for use as the inside covers. It was an editor who suggested having a singular picture that continues across the various spines, but unlike the tankōbon edition, the number of volumes was already determined, so they knew exactly how long it needed to be.

The December 2012 (cover date February 2013) issue of V Jump announced that parts of the manga would be fully colored digitally and re-released as Dragon Ball Full Color. 20 volumes, beginning from chapter 195 and grouped by story arcs, were released between February 4, 2013, and July 4, 2014. 12 volumes covering the first 194 chapters were published between January 4 and March 4, 2016. Dragon Ball was also released in a sōshūhen edition that aims to recreate the manga as it was originally serialized in Weekly Shōnen Jump in the same size, with the color pages, promotional text, and next chapter previews, in addition to foldout posters. Eighteen volumes of Dragon Ball Sōshūhen Chō Gōku Den were published between May 13, 2016, and January 13, 2017.

On May 10, 2025, Shueisha announced the publication of a new box set comprising the 42 volumes, commemorating the manga's 40th anniversary, set to be released on February 4, 2026. Each volume in the collection will feature double covers showcasing artwork by 42 manga artists; the artworks first appeared in Saikyō Jump magazine's regular "Dragon Ball Super Gallery" feature from 2021 to 2025.

=== English publication ===
The English language version of the Dragon Ball manga is licensed for North America by Viz Media. Viz originally published the first 194 chapters as Dragon Ball and chapters over 195 as Dragon Ball Z to mimic the names of the anime series, feeling it would reduce the potential for confusion by its readers. They initially released both series simultaneously, chapter by chapter in a monthly comic book format starting in 1998, before stopping in 2000 to switch to a graphic novel format similar to the Japanese tankōbon. In 2000, while releasing Dragon Ball in the monthly format, Viz began to censor the manga in response to parental complaints about sexual innuendos. Viz then released uncensored "13 and Up" editions for subsequent comic book issues and graphic novels, with the first three collected volumes reprinted later.

Viz changed their publishing format for the series again in 2003; the first 10 collected volumes of both series were re-released under their new Shonen Jump imprint. They have slightly smaller dimensions. The manga was completed in English with Dragon Ball in 16 volumes between May 6, 2003, and August 3, 2004, and Dragon Ball Z in 26 volumes from May 6, 2003, to June 6, 2006. However, when publishing the last few volumes of Z, the company began to censor the series again by changing or removing gun scenes and changing the few sexual references. Dragon Ball Z, from Trunks' appearance to chapter 226, was published in Viz's monthly magazine Shonen Jump from its debut issue in January 2003 to April 2005.

Viz released both series in a wideban format called "Viz Big Edition", which collects three volumes into a single large volume. Dragon Ball was published in five volumes between June 3, 2008, and August 18, 2009, while Dragon Ball Z was published in nine volumes between June 3, 2008, and November 9, 2010. Viz published new 3-in-1 volumes of Dragon Ball, similar to their Viz Big Edition, across 14 volumes between June 4, 2013, and September 6, 2016. This version uses some Japanese kanzenban covers and marks the first time in English that the entire series was released under the Dragon Ball name, though it is still censored. Viz serialized chapters 195 to 245 of the fully colored version of the manga in their digital anthology Weekly Shonen Jump from February 2013 to February 2014. They published the Saiyan and Freeza arcs of Dragon Ball Full Color Edition in large format volumes between February 4, 2014, and January 3, 2017. Although it uses the same translation as their other versions, this release has some slight dialogue changes including censoring any profanity and abbreviating lengthy sentences. It also leaves the Japanese sound effects and word bubbles unaltered.

The manga has also been licensed in other English-speaking countries, initially distributed in the same Viz format of separating it into Dragon Ball and Dragon Ball Z. From August 2005 to November 2007, Gollancz Manga, an imprint of the Orion Publishing Group released the 16 volumes of Dragon Ball and the first four of Dragon Ball Z in the United Kingdom. Viz took over the UK license after Gollancz left the manga market. In Australia and New Zealand, Madman Entertainment has released all 16 volumes of Dragon Ball and the nine "Viz Big" volumes of Dragon Ball Z between 2009 and 2010. Shueisha's Manga Plus digital platform publishes the entire series under the Dragon Ball name in English and Spanish.

==== Controversy in the United States ====
The manga's content has been controversial in the United States. In November 1999, Toys "R" Us removed Viz's Dragon Ball from their stores nationwide when a Dallas parent complained that the series had "borderline soft porn" after he bought them for his four-year-old son. Commenting on the issue, manga critic Susan J. Napier determined the ban as a difference in culture due to Japan having tolerance for sexuality in manga while other countries do not. After the ban, Viz reluctantly began to censor the series in 2000 to maintain its wide distribution. Viz made some "concessions" as well, and assured readers that all changes were approved by Toriyama and Shueisha. Toriyama made suggestions himself such as obscuring Goku's genitals with objects, rather than "neuter him." A fan petition was created, garnering over 10,000 signatures, and a year later, Viz announced they would stop censoring Dragon Ball and increased its "age rating" to 13 and up instead, reprinting the first three graphic novels. However, they continued to censor several characters' lips by shading them in completely. This avoided racist stereotypes, such as that of Mr. Popo's image. In October 2009, Wicomico County Public Schools in Maryland banned the Dragon Ball manga from their school district because it "depicts nudity, sexual contact between children and sexual innuendo among adults and children." Esther Keller, Robin Brenner and Eva Volin of School Library Journal had no opinion on whether or not removing the manga from all schools in that district was right. However, Brenner and Volin criticized the parents who had a problem with the manga for going to a county council member who is involved with politics instead of to the librarian of the school that carried the manga.

=== Other publications ===
While Dragon Ball was licensed in the United States by Viz Media, it has been licensed in other countries as well for regional language releases in French by Glénat Editions, in Spanish by Planeta DeAgostini for European versions, and Panini Comics for Latin American versions, in Italian by Star Comics, in German by Carlsen Verlag, in Russian by Comix-ART, in Polish by Japonica Polonica Fantastica, and in Swedish by Bonnier Group.

== Spin-offs and crossovers ==
A special side story, titled "Trunks: The Story - The Lone Warrior" (TRUNKS THE STORY －たったひとりの戦士－, Torankusu za Sutōrī -Tatta Hitori no Senshi-), was developed by Toriyama and published together with chapter 386 on August 31, 1992, in issue No. 36/37 of Weekly Shōnen Jump. Toriyama created a short series, Neko Majin, that became a self-parody of Dragon Ball. First appearing in August 1999, the eight-chapter series was released sporadically in Weekly Shōnen Jump and Monthly Shōnen Jump until it was completed in 2005. These chapters were compiled into one kanzenban volume released on April 4, 2005.

In 2006, to celebrate the 30th anniversary of Kochira Katsushika-ku Kameari Kōen-mae Hashutsujo (or Kochikame), a special manga titled Super Kochikame (超こち亀, Chō Kochikame) was released on September 15. It included characters from the series appearing in special crossover chapters of other well-known manga. The chapter "This is the Police Station in front of Dragon Park on Planet Namek" (こちらナメック星ドラゴン公園前派出所, Kochira Namekku-sei Dragon Kōen-mae Hashutsujo) was a Dragon Ball crossover by Toriyama and Kochikame author Osamu Akimoto. That same year, Toriyama teamed up with Eiichiro Oda to create a single crossover chapter of Dragon Ball and One Piece. Entitled "Cross Epoch", the chapter was published in the Christmas 2006 issue of Weekly Shōnen Jump in Japanese and the April 2011 issue of Shonen Jump in English. The final chapter of Toriyama's 2013 manga series Jaco the Galactic Patrolman revealed that it is set before Dragon Ball, with several characters making appearances. Jaco's collected volume contains a bonus Dragon Ball chapter revealing Goku's mother. Jaco and the bonus chapter were both published by Viz in their digital English Weekly Shonen Jump, and later in print.

Dragon Ball SD is a colored spin-off manga written and illustrated by Naho Ōishi was published in Shueisha's Saikyō Jump magazine in December 2010. It is a condensed retelling of Goku's various adventures, with many details changed, in a super deformed art style, hence the title. After four chapters, the quarterly Saikyō Jump switched to a monthly schedule. The chapters published after the monthly switch have been collected into five tankōbon volumes as of February 2, 2018. Dragon Ball: Episode of Bardock is a three-chapter manga, once again penned by Naho Ōishi, that was published in the monthly magazine V Jump from August to October 2011. It is a sequel to the 1990 TV special Bardock – The Father of Goku with some key details changed. The manga's story revolves around Bardock, Goku's father, who is featured in a scenario where he did not die at the hands of Freeza and fights his enemy's ancestor as a Super Saiyan.

On December 12, 2016, the first chapter of a spin-off manga titled Dragon Ball: That Time I Got Reincarnated as Yamcha! (DRAGON BALL外伝 転生したらヤムチャだった件, Doragon Bōru Gaiden: Tensei-shitara Yamucha Datta Ken) was released in Shueisha's Shōnen Jump+ digital magazine. Written and illustrated by Dragongarow Lee, it is about a high school boy who wakes up after an accident in the body of Yamcha in the Dragon Ball manga. Knowing what comes later in the story, he trains as Yamcha to make him the strongest warrior. Utilizing the "reincarnated in a parallel world" theme popular in light novels, the series was conceived by Shōnen Jump+ editor-in-chief Shuhei Hosono. A second chapter was released on May 8, 2017, and the final one on August 14, 2017. A tankōbon collecting all three chapters was published on November 2, 2017, and has 240,000 copies in print. Viz licensed the series for English publication and released the collected volume on November 6, 2018.

== Reception ==
=== Sales ===
Dragon Ball is one of the most popular manga series of all time. It is credited as one of the main reasons manga circulation was at its highest between the mid-1980s and mid-1990s. During Dragon Ball's initial run in Weekly Shōnen Jump, the manga magazine reached an average circulation of 6.53 million weekly sales, the highest in its history.

The collected volumes of Dragon Ball have sold in record numbers. By 2000, more than 126 million tankōbon copies had been sold in Japan. By 2008, it had over 150 million copies in circulation and was the best-selling manga ever at the time. In 2012, Shueisha announced that Dragon Ball volume sales had grown to more than 156 million, making it the second best-selling Weekly Shōnen Jump manga of all time, behind One Piece. Two years later, this number had grown to 159.5 million copies. By November 2015, the manga had over 230 million copies in circulation worldwide, including 140 million tankōbon volumes and 20 million kanzenban volumes in Japan. The total number of Dragon Ball volumes sold reached 260 million copies worldwide by 2022.

=== Popularity ===
The manga is popular overseas, having been translated and released in over 40 countries worldwide. For the 10th anniversary of the Japan Media Arts Festival in 2006, close to 79,000 Japanese fans voted Dragon Ball the third greatest manga of all time. In a 2007 survey of one-thousand people conducted by Oricon, Goku ranked in first place as the "Strongest Manga Character of All Time". Coinciding with the 2012 Summer Olympics, Oricon conducted a survey at the international World Cosplay Summit on which manga and anime series attendees considered world class works. Dragon Ball was overwhelmingly in first place. In November 2014, readers of Da Vinci magazine voted Dragon Ball the greatest Weekly Shōnen Jump manga series of all time. The Portuguese edition of Dragon Ball won the 2001 Troféu HQ Mix for Best Serial. On TV Asahi's Manga Sōsenkyo 2021 poll, in which 150,000 people voted for their top 100 manga series, Dragon Ball ranked fifth.

In 2011, manga critic and editor of Viz's editions of the series Jason Thompson said that: "Dragon Ball is by far the most influential shonen manga of the last 30 years, and today, almost every Shōnen Jump artist lists it as one of their favorites and lifts from it in various ways." Explaining its basic formula of "lots of martial arts, lots of training sequences, [and] a few jokes" became the model for other shōnen series, such as Naruto. Thompson cited the artwork as influential, pointing out that popular shōnen manga of the late 1980s and early 1990s had "manly" heroes, such as City Hunter and Fist of the North Star, whereas Dragon Ball had the cartoonish and small Goku, thus starting a trend that he says still continues. Commenting on Dragon Ball's global success nearly two decades after it ended, Toriyama said, "Frankly, I don't quite understand why it happened. While the manga was being serialized, the only thing I wanted as I kept drawing was to make Japanese boys happy. The role of my manga is to be a work of entertainment through and through. I dare say I don't care even if [my works] have left nothing behind, as long as they have entertained their readers."

=== Critical reception ===
The manga has received a mostly positive reception from critics. Jason Thompson commented that Dragon Ball "turns from a gag/adventure manga to a nearly-pure fighting manga". James S. Yadao, author of The Rough Guide to Manga, explains that the first several chapters "play out much like Saiyuki (Journey to the West) with Dr. Slump-like humour built in" and that Dr. Slump, Toriyama's previous manga, has a clear early influence on the series. He feels the series "established its unique identity" after the first time Goku's group disbands and he trains under Kame-Sen'nin. On the second half of the manga, he commented that it developed "a far more action-packed, sinister tone" with "wilder" battles and aerial and spiritual elements with an increased death count. David Brothers for ComicsAlliance wrote that: "Like Osamu Tezuka and Jack Kirby before him, Toriyama created a story with his own two hands that seeped deep into the hearts of his readers, creating a love for both the cast and the medium at the same time." He said that while the author has "a sublime combination of Looney Tunes-style classic humor and dirty jokes," the best part of Dragon Ball is the fight scenes. Brothers explained that while Western superhero comics "would focus on a series of cool poses or impact shots" with the reader having to fill in the blanks between panels, Dragon Ball has a panel dedicated to one action and the next panel features the very next maneuver, making them incredibly easy to follow.

Fusanosuke Natsume says that the theme of disaster and growth in the manga is a reference to "post-War Japanese manga" that Osamu Tezuka began in the mid 1940s. He also comments that the violence in the manga has context that children can understand, and is not just there at random. While Toriyama has said that Journey to the West was an influence on the manga, Xavier Mínguez-López comments that it is a parody of the Chinese novel, since the stories are similar. He notes that Toriyama uses Chinese mythology and Japanese folktales, the dragon Shenlong who is summoned from the Dragon Balls, as well as characters who are able to come back to life as examples of similarities. Rachel Cantrell says that the manga parodies martial arts very well, and mentions how Toriyama uses panels to a full extent. She notes that the manga has a coming-of-age theme due to how the story captures Goku from a child to an adult. Dr. Frédéric Ducarme compared Goku's backstory to that of Superman, with whom the character has often been compared, but wrote that Goku remains a sportsman throughout the manga, not an avenger or vigilante.

Carlo Santos of the Anime News Network described Dragon Ball's setting as "a melting pot of sci-fi, fantasy, and folklore". Santos praised its quick development of new characters and storylines, and claimed that the series' crowning achievement is in its dynamic fight scenes. However, he did not enjoy the cliché training and tournament segments, nor its crude humor. His colleague Allen Divers praised the manga's story and humor as being very good at conveying all the characters' personalities. Divers also called Viz's translation one of the best of all the English editions of the series due to its faithfulness to the original Japanese. Animerica felt the series had "worldwide appeal," using dramatic pacing and over-the-top martial arts action to "maintain tension levels and keep a crippler crossface hold on the audience's attention spans". Comic Book Bin's Leroy Douresseaux described Toriyama as a "super-cartoonist," a blend of Carl Barks, Jack Kirby, and Peyo. He gave Dragon Ball a perfect rating and called it one of the best manga and comic books he has ever read. Ridwan Khan of Animefringe.com commented that the manga had a "chubby" art style, but as the series continued the characters became more refined, leaner, and more muscular. He cited one slight problem in Viz's release; the translation uses informal language to capture Goku's country accent, but it ends up feeling "forced and odd". Khan prefers the manga over the slow pacing of the anime adaptations. Including it on a list of "10 Essential Manga That Should Belong in Every Comic Collection", Matthew Meylikhov of Paste also praised the manga over the anime as an entirely different and more "involved experience." He wrote that "You come to know and care for the characters more intimately, and the joy and wonder of watching them fight, learn and grow throughout the series improves tenfold." Manga author Nobuhiro Watsuki commented that the traditional portrayal of protagonists and their adversaries engaging in killing shifted in shōnen manga after Dragon Ball started the trend of resurrecting characters.

== Legacy and cultural impact ==
Dragon Ball is considered one of the most influential manga of all time. Many manga artists have cited it and Toriyama as inspirations, including Fairy Tail and Rave author Hiro Mashima, Black Clover creator Yūki Tabata, and Boruto: Naruto Next Generations illustrator Mikio Ikemoto. Both One Piece creator Eiichiro Oda and Naruto creator Masashi Kishimoto have said that Goku inspired their series' main protagonists as well as their structures. For the kanzenban re-release of Dragon Ball, every odd-numbered volume included a tribute illustration by a popular manga artist who was a child when it was serialized, accompanied with a few words about how the series influenced them. The artists who contributed include: Bleach creator Tite Kubo, Black Cat author Kentaro Yabuki, The Seven Deadly Sins author Nakaba Suzuki, Eyeshield 21 and One-Punch Man illustrator Yusuke Murata, Bobobo-bo Bo-bobo creator Yoshio Sawai, Pretty Face author Yasuhiro Kanō, Mr. Fullswing author Shinya Suzuki, Hellsing creator Kouta Hirano, Claymore author Norihiro Yagi, Phantom Thief Jeanne and Full Moon o Sagashite creator Arina Tanemura, Excel Saga author Rikdo Koshi, Dragon Drive creator Kenichi Sakura, and Happy World! author Kenjiro Takeshita. French comics artist Tony Valente cited Dragon Ball as an influence, especially the adventure aspect of its early portion. The producer of the Tekken video game series, Katsuhiro Harada, said that Dragon Ball was one of the first works to visually depict chi and thereby influenced Tekken and other Japanese games such as Street Fighter. Ian Jones-Quartey, a producer of the American animated series Steven Universe, is a fan of Dragon Ball and Dr. Slump, and uses Toriyama's vehicle designs as a reference for his own. He also stated that "We're all big Toriyama fans on [Steven Universe], which kind of shows a bit." French director Pierre Perifel cited Toriyama and Dragon Ball as influences on his DreamWorks Animation film The Bad Guys.

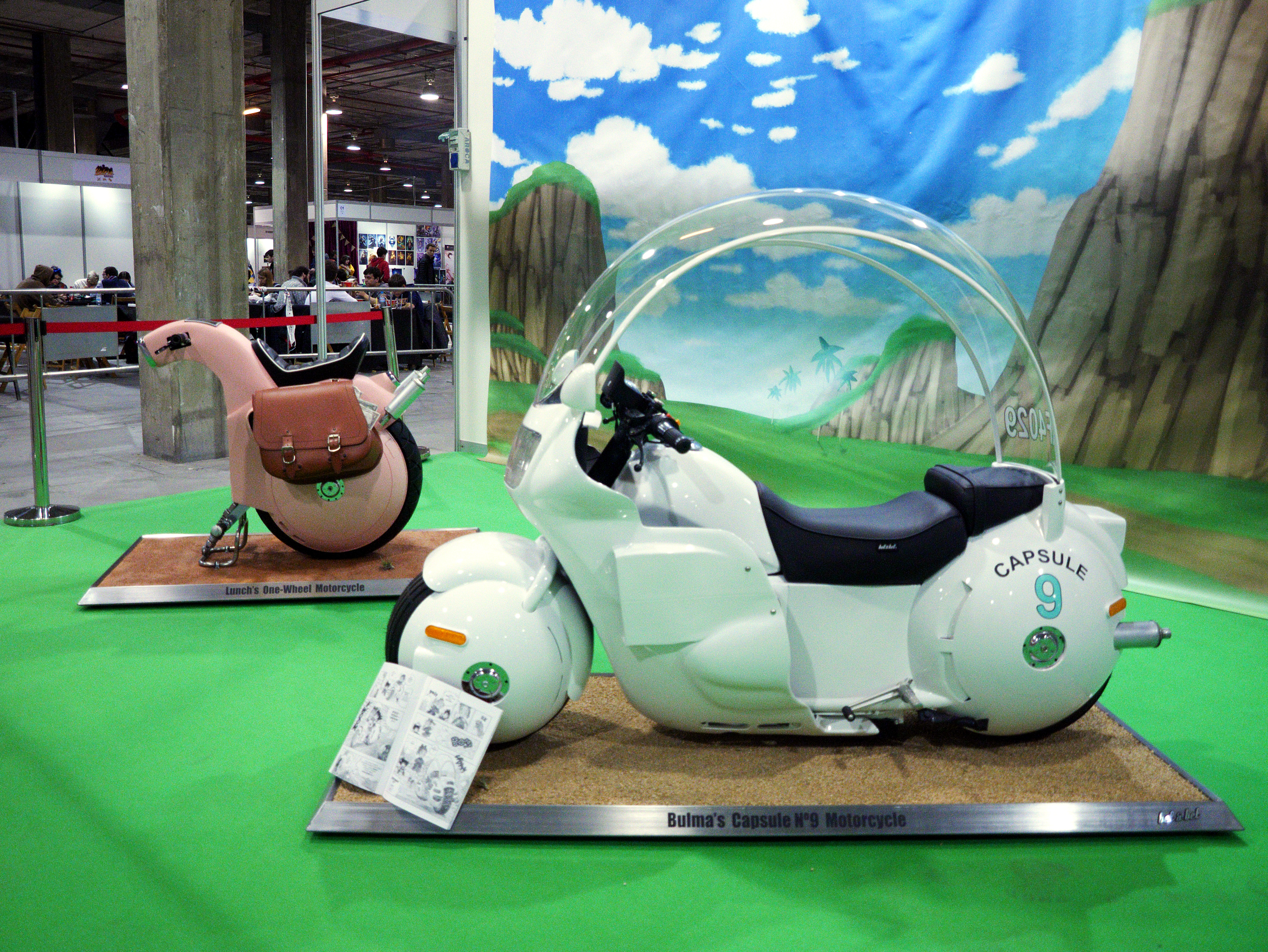
Life-size replicas of two vehicles seen in Dragon Ball

After searching for a real-life equivalent to the supernaturally nutritious Senzu seen in Dragon Ball, Mitsuru Izumo founded Euglena Company in 2005 and started making supplements and food products out of Euglena. In 2014, entomologist Enio B. Cano named a new species of beetle Ogyges toriyamai after Toriyama, and another Ogyges mutenroshii, after the Dragon Ball character Muten Roshi. In 2025, researchers named a new species of goby Vanderhorstia supersaiyan after the Super Saiyan transformation seen in Dragon Ball due to the fish's yellow stripes.

On March 27, 2013, the "Akira Toriyama: The World of Dragon Ball" exhibit opened at the Takashimaya department store in Nihonbashi, attracting 72,000 visitors in its first nineteen days. The exhibit is separated into seven areas. The first provides a look at the series' history, the second shows the series' 400-plus characters, the third displays Toriyama's manga manuscripts of memorable scenes, the fourth shows special color illustrations, the fifth displays rare Dragon Ball-related materials, the sixth includes design sketches and animation cels from the anime, and the seventh screens Dragon Ball-related videos. It remained until April 15 when it moved to Osaka from April 17 to 23, and ended in Toriyama's native Nagoya from July 27 to September 1.

An interactive exhibit called "Dragon Ball Meets Science" (ドラゴンボールで科学する!, Doragon Bōru de Kagaku Suru!) was displayed in Nagoya in summer 2014. Installations included an EEG that measured visitors' alpha brain waves to move Goku's flying cloud. The following year it went to Taiwan, then Tokyo from April 29 to May 10, and Osaka between July 18 and August 31. A retrospective exhibit called "The Beginning of the Legend" featured Dragon Ball along with other popular Weekly Shōnen Jump manga for the 50th anniversary of the magazine in 2018.

In 2015, the Japan Anniversary Association officially declared May 9 as "Goku Day" (悟空の日, Gokū no Hi). In Japanese the numbers five and nine can be pronounced as "Go" and "Ku". In October 2016, Shueisha announced they had created a new department on June 21 called the Dragon Ball Room (ドラゴンボール室, Doragon Bōru Shitsu). Headed by V Jump editor-in-chief Akio Iyoku, it was dedicated solely to Dragon Ball and optimizing and expanding the brand. Dragon Ball Store Tokyo, the first retail store dedicated to the franchise, opened at Tokyo Station Ichibangai on November 14, 2025. In addition to offering exclusive merchandise, the store features a life-sized statue of Son Goku and Shenlong and displays of original artwork. To commemorate the 40th anniversary of Dragon Ball, the Japan Mint released two sets, each containing a medallion and six coins that range in denominations from 1 to 500 yen, in December 2025.

Nobuyuki Sakakibara, the founder of Pride Fighting Championships and Rizin Fighting Federation, noted how Toriyama conceived of a tournament featuring martial artists of various disciplines competing against each other with the Tenkaichi Budōkai in 1985, before mixed martial arts was coined or established. Canadian mixed martial artist Carlos Newton dubbed his fighting style "Dragon Ball jiu-jitsu" in tribute to the series. Japanese mixed martial artist Itsuki Hirata is nicknamed "Android 18" due to her resemblance to the Dragon Ball character. Japanese kickboxer Panchan Rina took her nickname from the Dragon Ball character Pan.
