= Dragon Ball Heroes =

2010 trading card video game

- Cover art for the Nintendo 3DS version of the game
- Developer: Dimps
- Publisher: Bandai Namco Entertainment
- Series: Dragon Ball
- Engine: Budokai series
- Platforms: Arcade, Nintendo 3DS, Nintendo Switch, Microsoft Windows
- Release: JP: November 11, 2010
- Genre: Digital collectible card game
- Mode: Single-player

Dragon Ball Heroes (Japanese: ドラゴンボール ヒーローズ, Hepburn: Doragon Bōru Hirozu) was a Japanese trading card arcade game based on the Dragon Ball franchise. It debuted on November 11, 2010, in Japan. In 2016, an update launched that improved the user experience in the form of enhanced graphics and easier accessibility of characters. This update was named Super Dragon Ball Heroes (スーパー ドラゴンボールヒーローズ). Several other games based on the series have been released for Nintendo 3DS, Nintendo Switch, and Microsoft Windows. Numerous manga adaptations have been published by Shueisha and a promotional anime adaptation by Toei Animation began being shown at public events in July 2018 before being uploaded online.

Dragon Ball Heroes ceased operations after 13 years of development and announced a sequel to the series, titled Dragon Ball Super Divers, which was announced on May 9, 2024. The game's producer, Akai announced during an interview with V-Jump Editor, Victory Uchida that though Heroes arcades will no longer be in operation, Super Divers will contain a "Super Dragon Ball Heroes mode" allowing players to play its missions and use their existing cards while adjusting with the new system.

== Gameplay ==
Players were able to choose a "hero avatar" from 8 different races.

== Adaptations ==
=== Manga ===
Dragon Ball Heroes was adapted into several manga series. Dragon Ball Heroes: Victory Mission (ドラゴンボール ヒーローズ ビクトリーミッション), written and illustrated by Toyotarou, was serialized in Shueisha's V Jump magazine since November 2012. With 28 chapters, it is on hiatus as Toyotarou is drawing Dragon Ball Super. A chapter 29 was included in the Bandai Official 5th Anniversary Fanbook: Dragon Ball Heroes 5th Anniversary Mission book published on November 19, 2015, and all previous chapters were uploaded to the game's website for free.

Dragon Ball Heroes: Charisma Mission! (ドラゴンボールヒーローズ 超（スーパー）カリスマミッション!), written and illustrated by Yoshitaka Nagayama, was serialized in Saikyō Jump from December 2013. It was put on hiatus, when Nagayama began his other series in the same magazine, until March 2017, when it was relaunched as Super Dragon Ball Heroes: Ultimate Charisma Mission!! (スーパードラゴンボールヒーローズ 極（アルティメット）カリスマミッション!!).

Nagayama also drew Super Dragon Ball Heroes: Ankoku Makai Mission! (スーパードラゴンボールヒーローズ 暗黒魔界ミッション！, Sūpā Doragon Bōru Hīrōzu Ankoku Makai Misshon!). Serialized in Saikyō Jump since August 5, 2016, its first collected volume was published on May 2, 2017 and its second on May 2, 2018. The series was relaunched as Super Dragon Ball Heroes: Universe Mission!! (スーパードラゴンボールヒーローズ ユニバースミッション!!) on April 6, 2018, and is serialized alongside Ultimate Charisma Mission!!.

== Arcade ==
In Japanese stores there are arcade machines that run Super Dragon Ball Heroes. It is the source material for all Super Dragon Ball Heroes media (Manga, Games, and the Anime). It contains an entire story arc and multiple subplots that the anime and manga skipped. For a fee, the arcade will deposit a few cards. There are multiple rarities such as: R, SR, UR, CAMPAIN, SEC. The player can then use said cards and scan them on the machine to play the multiplayer mode.

=== Anime ===
In May 2018, V Jump announced a promotional anime for Super Dragon Ball Heroes that will adapt the game's Prison Planet arc. A teaser trailer for the first episode was released on June 21, 2018, and shows the new characters Fu (フュー, Fyū) and Kanbā (カンバー), an evil Saiyan. The first episode was shown at Aeon Lake Town, a shopping mall in Koshigaya, Saitama, on July 1, 2018, and was uploaded to the game's official website that same day. Likewise, the second episode was shown at Jump Victory Carnival Tokyo Kaijō on July 16 before being uploaded to the website.

== Production ==
Dragon Ball creator Akira Toriyama supervised the game's designs and setting. He also designed the three Freeza clan characters.

=== Legacy ===
Nintendo 3DS, named Dragon Ball Heroes: Ultimate Mission, was released on February 28, 2013 in Japan. A sequel, Dragon Ball Heroes: Ultimate Mission 2, was released on August 7, 2014. Dragon Ball Heroes: Ultimate Mission X was released on April 27, 2017.

In October 2018, a Nintendo Switch game titled Super Dragon Ball Heroes: World Mission was announced for release on April 4, 2019. It will include cards and characters from the first eight Super Dragon Ball Heroes arcade games and the first two versions of Super Dragon Ball Heroes: Universe Mission.

== Reception ==
Reception

Aggregate score
Aggregator	Score
Metacritic	NS: 69/100; PC: 72/100

Dragon Ball Heroes is the number one digital card game. By May 2016, the game had sold 400 million cards and grossed over ¥40 billion ($365 million). By October 2016, the game sold 500 million cards and grossed ¥50 billion ($460 million).
