= Toyotarou =

Japanese manga artist

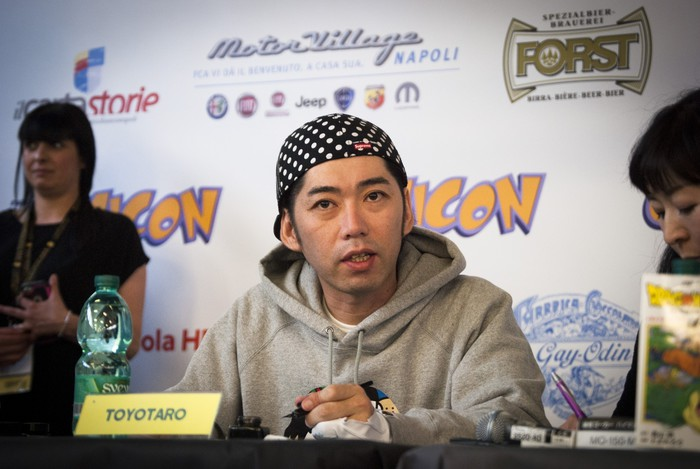
- Toyotarou at Napoli Comicon, Italy (2017)
- Born: May 17, 1978 (age 48); Tochigi Prefecture, Japan
- Occupation: Manga artist
- Years active: 2012–present
- Employer: Shueisha
- Known for: Dragon Ball Super

Toyotarou (Japanese: とよたろう, Hepburn: Toyotarō; born May 17, 1978) is a Japanese manga artist. He has drawn several Dragon Ball-related manga and is best known for illustrating Dragon Ball Super (2015–present), which was written by series creator Akira Toriyama until his death in March 2024.

== Early life and work ==
Toyotarou first came across Akira Toriyama's work in grade school with Dr. Slump, then the Dragon Ball anime, and finally the Dragon Ball manga. With his school notebooks covered in its characters, he was already making up story arcs for Dragon Ball chapters in his head. To this day, Toyotarou has never drawn any original work of his own; his work has always been Dragon Ball-related. Previously a television director, Toyotarou never desired to be a career manga artist. "I figured it would be impossible to do it officially, so I resigned myself to doing it as a hobby." In 2012, he brought artwork to Shueisha, and six months later he debuted with the first two-page chapter of Dragon Ball Heroes: Victory Mission.

== Career ==
Toyotarou made his professional debut with Dragon Ball Heroes: Victory Mission in the November 2012 issue of the monthly magazine V Jump. It is a tie-in manga with the video game series Dragon Ball Heroes and ran for 28 chapters until it was put on hiatus after the February 2015 issue. A chapter 29 was included in the Bandai Official 5th Anniversary Fanbook: Dragon Ball Heroes 5th Anniversary Mission book published on November 19, 2015, and all previous chapters were uploaded to the game's website for free.

Toyotarou also drew a manga adaptation of the film Dragon Ball Z: Resurrection 'F', which was written by Toriyama. It began in the April 2015 issue of the monthly V Jump and ran for three chapters.

Toyotarou began Dragon Ball Super in the August 2015 issue of V Jump, which was released on June 20, 2015. He illustrated the manga while Toriyama wrote the story. Although the anime usually adapted Toriyama's story ahead of the manga, some characters for the "Universe Survival arc" were reported as being designed by Toyotarou, and a few by both him and Toriyama. After covering the last story arc seen in the anime series in November 2018, the Dragon Ball Super manga continued with original story arcs. Following Toriyama's death in March 2024, Dragon Ball Super was put on indefinite hiatus. A one-shot of the series was published in the April 2025 edition of V Jump on February 20, 2025.

Toyotarou also worked with Toriyama on Dragon Ball Xenoverse 2 The Manga, an adaptation of the 2016 video game Dragon Ball Xenoverse 2 that he illustrated exclusively for the collector's edition of the game. He created the one-shot Dragon Ball Super Divers for the December 2024 issue of V Jump, which was published on October 21, 2024. It is based on the arcade game of the same name that was created as the successor to Dragon Ball Heroes.

At the invitation of Toriyama's original editor on Dragon Ball, Kazuhiko Torishima, Toyotarou gave a lecture with him at the 2025 Japan Expo in Paris on July 6.

== Style ==
Toyotarou is a self-taught artist, having never formally studied manga. He said his drawing style is most heavily influenced by Toriyama's style around the time of the Majin Boo arc of Dragon Ball. When asked what his favorite manga is other than Dragon Ball, he answered with Toriyama's Soldier of Savings Cashman or Nobuhiro Watsuki's Rurouni Kenshin. He is more inspired by film than manga, particularly those made by Disney, Marvel, and Pixar.

Toyotarou explained that for Dragon Ball Super he received the major plot points from Toriyama, before drawing the storyboard and filling in the details in between himself. He sent the storyboard to Toriyama for review, who gave feedback and made alterations before returning it to Toyotarou, who illustrated the final manuscript and sent it to Shueisha for publication. During the last week of his monthly deadlines, Toyotarou estimated that he spends about 18 hours a day drawing.

Toriyama said that of everyone who works on the Dragon Ball franchise, Toyotarou's artwork is the closest to his own. Amy McNulty of Anime News Network concurred, calling Toyotarou's art "virtually indistinguishable" from Toriyama's. Toyotarou himself said he is confident in reproducing Toriyama's characters and their subtleties, but needs to practice on robots and mecha. As far as the differences, he noted that he draws more panels and close-ups than Toriyama and does his screentone digitally.

Toyotarou uses both analog and digital equipment in his manga. Describing his process for a color illustration, he said he begins by sketching on paper with a pen, before scanning it into a computer and adjusting the balance. After changing the color of the lines to blue and printing it onto paper, he uses the blue sketch as a guide as he inks with a dip pen. He scans the inked paper back into a computer, as everything from the coloring stage onward is done digitally. "I use either 'anime-style coloring', which is like cel animation, or 'brush coloring', which has strong shadow gradients. Anime-style coloring is easier, but brush coloring gives a more powerful effect, so I use brush coloring when I have the time."

== Works ==
=== Manga ===
- Dragon Ball Heroes: Victory Mission (2012–2015, serialized in V Jump)
- Dragon Ball Z: Resurrection 'F' (2015, written by Akira Toriyama, serialized in V Jump)
- Dragon Ball Super (2015–present, written by Akira Toriyama, serialized in V Jump)
- Dragon Ball Xenoverse 2 The Manga (2016, written by Akira Toriyama, included in the collector's edition of the video game)
- Dragon Ball Super Divers (2024, published in V Jump)

=== Other work ===
- Super Dragon Ball Heroes: World Mission (2019) – designed the character Sealas (シーラス, Shīrasu)
