= Dragon Ball Super =

Japanese manga series

- First tankōbon volume cover, featuring Son Goku above Shenlong

ドラゴンボール 超(スーパー) (Doragon Bōru Sūpā)
- Genre: Adventure; Fantasy comedy; Martial arts
- Manga
- Written by: Akira Toriyama
- Illustrated by: Toyotarou
- Published by: Shueisha
- English publisher: NA: Viz Media
- Imprint: Jump Comics
- Magazine: V Jump
- Original run: June 20, 2015 – present
- Volumes: 24
- Anime television series
- Dragon Ball Super (2015–2018); Dragon Ball Super: Beerus (2026–); Dragon Ball Super: The Galactic Patrol (TBA)
- Anime films
- Dragon Ball Super: Broly (2018); Dragon Ball Super: Super Hero (2022)
- Media franchise
- List of all Dragon Ball anime; List of all Dragon Ball films; List of all Dragon Ball manga; List of all Dragon Ball video games; List of all Dragon Ball soundtracks
- icon

Dragon Ball Super (Japanese: ドラゴンボール超(スーパー), Hepburn: Doragon Bōru Sūpā) is a Japanese manga series written by Akira Toriyama and illustrated by Toyotarou. Set during the time frame of Toriyama's original Dragon Ball manga, it follows the adventures of Son Goku and his friends during the ten-year timeskip after the defeat of Majin Boo. After meeting the destructive deity Beerus, and attaining the power of a god, Goku ends up traveling to other universes. It began serialization in Shueisha's monthly shōnen manga magazine V Jump in June 2015, and is currently on hiatus following Toriyama's death in March 2024. Viz Media has licensed the series for release in North America.

Toriyama wrote the major plot points, while Toyotarou drew the manga and filled in details himself. Toriyama's plot was also adapted into an anime television series produced by Toei Animation, which aired on Fuji TV in Japan from July 2015 to March 2018. Two animated films have also been released under the Dragon Ball Super brand: Broly (2018) and Super Hero (2022), and were themselves tied into the manga. A sequel to the anime, Dragon Ball Super: The Galactic Patrol, which adapts the manga's "Galactic Patrol Prisoner" story arc, has been announced.

As of April 2025, the manga had over 12 million copies in circulation.

== Plot summary ==
Beerus, the God of Destruction, begins searching for a warrior known as the "Super Saiyan God" that he saw in a premonition. After using the Dragon Balls to learn that Super Saiyan God is a temporary transformation his race can achieve, Goku has his fellow Saiyans perform a ritual so that he can attain the deity-like form. His fight with Beerus ends undecided and the latter spares Earth. Following the events of Dragon Ball Z: Resurrection 'F' (2015), (Note: Although the events of the film are not shown in the manga, they are briefly summarized at the beginning of this story arc.) Goku and Vegeta have both achieved a form beyond Super Saiyan God, dubbed Super Saiyan Blue, and are training with Whis, when Champa, the God of Destruction of Universe 6 and Beerus' twin brother, proposes a tournament between inhabitants of his universe and Universe 7, the one where Goku and his friends reside, in order to determine which universe will take Universe 7's Earth and get to use the Super Dragon Balls, the original planet-size Dragon Balls scattered throughout both universes from which the Namekian ones were derived, which can grant any wish. Goku, Vegeta and Piccolo face opponents such as Frost, the Saiyan Cabbe and the legendary assassin Hit, before winning the tournament. It draws the attention of Zenō-sama, the Lord of Everything who rules over all twelve universes, who wishes to watch another tournament involving the rest of the universes in the future.

Future Trunks returns from his timeline, having fled from someone he calls Goku Black, a Goku doppelgänger who wants to annihilate all mortals on Earth in the name of justice. Goku Black is eventually identified as Zamas, a Lord of Worlds in Universe 10 and apprentice Lord of Lords, who killed his teacher, used the Super Dragon Balls to switch bodies with Goku and killed him, traveled to Future Trunks' timeline, and killed the remaining Lords of Lords, which in turn killed the Gods of Destruction. The Zamas of Trunks' timeline, who used the Dragon Balls to make himself immortal, also appears and teams up with Goku Black. They eventually fuse into one immortal body they call God Zamas and everyone plans to flee to the main timeline out of futility. However, Goku summons the Zenō-sama of Trunks' timeline, who destroys the universe and God Zamas, while everyone else flees to the main timeline. Goku then retrieves that Zenō-sama and brings him to the main timeline, while Future Trunks travels back to his, but before the Lord of Lords died so he can warn Beerus about Zamas.

Both Zenō-samas later hold the Tournament of Power (力の大会, Chikara no Taikai), where teams of ten fighters from eight of the twelve universes battle, with the defeated universes being erased from existence. Goku, Vegeta, Piccolo, Son Gohan, Kuririn, Android 18, Tenshinhan and Kame-Sennin are joined by Android 17 and a temporarily revived Freeza. They battle formidable warriors, such as female Saiyans Caulifla and Kale and Pride Troopers Toppo and Jiren. Goku attains a state known as Ultra Instinct -Sign-, allowing him to dodge attacks subconsciously. Android 17 wins the tournament for Universe 7 and is awarded with a wish from the Super Dragon Balls, which he uses to restore the erased universes. As a reward for helping in the tournament, Freeza is permanently revived by Whis.

Following the events of the film Dragon Ball Super: Broly (2018), Goku and Vegeta are inducted as temporary members of the Galactic Patrol and tasked with capturing an escaped fugitive named Moro, a millennia-old magical being who destroyed innumerous planets by absorbing their life energy, before his magic was sealed by the Great Lord of Lords. Moro defeats the two Saiyans and Majin Boo, within whom the Galactic Patrol awakens memories as the Great Lord of Lords, as Boo had absorbed the Great Lord of Lords 5 million years ago. Moro then uses the Namekian Dragon Balls to restore his full power and release all the criminals from Galactic Prison, before rampaging across the galaxy as he absorbs planets. On Earth, his army engages Goku's allies, backed by Jaco and the Galactic Patrol, in battle across the planet. When Goku is gravely wounded, Beerus and Whis mildly intervene in mortal affairs, and Goku finally perfects Ultra Instinct. Near defeat, Moro fuses with the Earth, threatening to self-destruct and destroy the galaxy. Vegeta uses his newly learned Forced Spirit Fission in reverse to give the energy of their friends and the god power of Uub, the reincarnation of the evil side of Boo and the half who actually inherited the Great Lord of Lords' powers, to Goku, allowing him to defeat Moro and save the Earth.

Bounty hunter Granolah learns from the Heeters, a sibling-run organization that deals in bounties and assassinations, that Freeza is alive and vows to get revenge for the massacre of his people. Using the Dragon Balls on planet Cereal, he becomes the strongest lifeform in the universe at the cost of drastically reducing his lifespan. The Heeters manipulate Granolah and Goku and Vegeta into fighting each other, during which, Vegeta, who has learned the technique of the Gods of Destruction, gains a new form dubbed Ultra Ego. Granolah's foster father, the Namekian Monaito, reveals that it was a Saiyan named Bardock who saved them from the attack on Cereal ordered by Freeza 40 years ago, and that Elec of the Heeters is the person who killed Granolah's mother. Meanwhile, Elec uses the Cerealian Dragon Balls to make his younger brother Gas the new strongest lifeform. Granolah charges up a final attack, which shortens his life even more, to finish Gas, but intentionally does not kill him. Having aged rapidly due to the battle, Gas begins fighting Goku and Vegeta again. However, Freeza appears and quickly kills Gas and Elec, before briefly unveiling a new form he calls Black Freeza and departing. Whis arrives to take Goku and Vegeta to Beerus' planet to train in order to catch up to Freeza, who is now stronger than them.

Magenta, CEO of Red Pharmaceuticals and son of Commander Red, recruits Dr. Gero's grandson and genius scientist Dr. Hedo to help build Androids for the reformed Red Ribbon Army and to seek revenge on Goku and his friends. Piccolo learns that they have Hedo working on an Android known as "Cell Max", but the doctor is hesitant to awaken it. Piccolo uses the Dragon Balls to awaken his own latent potential, with Shenlong throwing in a "bit extra" as a bonus, and forms a plan with Pan to lure Gohan to the Red Ribbon Army's base. Together, Gohan and Piccolo battle Gamma #1 and Gamma #2, who view them as villains and begin to lose the fight once Piccolo achieves a new form that he calls Orange Piccolo. Eventually, the Androids realize Dr. Hedo was misled and that it is the Red Ribbon Army who are evil. Magenta retreats and is killed by Dr. Hedo, but not before activating Cell Max. Bulma arrives with Son Goten, Trunks, Kuririn and Android 18, just as the fight against the giant version of Cell begins. Gamma #2 sacrifices himself and severs Cell's left arm. When it appears as if Piccolo has been killed, Gohan attains a new transformation, later dubbed Beast, and successfully defeats Cell Max with Piccolo's help. After the final battle, a repentant Dr. Hedo and Gamma #1 are employed by Bulma.

== Production ==
When the Dragon Ball Super anime was first announced, Akira Toriyama was reported to be credited for the "original story and character design concepts", in addition to his regular role as series creator. Toyotarou, illustrator of the Dragon Ball Super manga, which began serialization before the anime began airing, explained that he received the major plot points from Toriyama, before drawing the storyboard and filling in the details himself. He would then send the storyboards to Toriyama for review, who would edit the initial draft, making changes to dialogue and art, before sending it back to Toyotarou, who illustrated the final draft and sent it to Shueisha for publication. In addition to new characters designed by Toriyama, other characters for the "Universe Survival arc" were designed by Toyotarou, and a few by both.

Although the anime series ended in March 2018, the Dragon Ball Super manga continued with original story arcs. For the "Galactic Patrol Prisoner arc", Toyotarou wanted the enemy Moro to be truly evil, like Piccolo Daimao was in the original Dragon Ball. He utilized elements of goats, a common Western demon motif, for the character and made his clothes shinigami-esque. Because Jaco and the Galactic King have "classic alien"-like designs, Toyotarou wanted Merus to have a retro look as well and so gave him a silver bob cut. But he also gave the character bishōnen elements because he wanted him to be popular. For the Yardratian race, who are mentioned but never appear in Toriyama's original Dragon Ball manga, Toyotarou and his editor Victory Uchida decided to use both the design seen in Dragon Ball Z and a design created by Toriyama.

The "Granolah the Survivor arc" came about when Toyotarou created Granolah after having proposed various ideas for characters and being unsure if he should use existing characters or create new ones. After settling on a new one connected to the Saiyans, he sent Granolah to his editor Victory Uchida. After the two brainstormed story ideas, he was then given the go-ahead to bring it to Toriyama, who came up with the plot proposal and added the group known as The Heeters. It was Toriyama's decision to have the newly revealed backstory on the Namekian race. Toyotarou called it the "sort of huge decision" that he (Toyotarou) can not make. Because Granolah's race went extinct in the story 50 years prior, Toyotarou made his clothing old-fashioned in addition to adding steampunk elements. After Toriyama reminded him that the Cerealians were not a warrior race but did enjoy fighting, Toyotarou imagined them as sharpshooters and gave Granolah his unique goggles. The goggles double as a communicator because he is a "lone warrior" and Toriyama had previously told him that having two characters converse better conveys characters' inner thoughts than having them talk to themselves. This led to the creation of the character Oatmeel. Toyotarou's designs for The Heeters were rejected three or four times before he came up with the final version, while Toriyama designed the Sugarians after Toyotarou's first two designs were rejected. Toriyama also designed the Namekian Monaito, whom he originally named "Slug" before it was changed to differentiate him from the character of the same name in the film Dragon Ball Z: Lord Slug (1991).

The main story and postlude of the "Super Hero arc", chapters 91 to 103, were largely written by Toriyama, although Toyotarou made some additions. With input by Toriyama, Toyotarou came up with the ideas for the prequel chapters 88 to 90, explaining; "I loved Gohan's high school arc [in the original manga] and wanted to place Trunks and Goten into that world." The Saiyaman X costume was conceived by Toyotarou to be both "lame and cool", before Toriyama polished and completed the design.

After the death of Akira Toriyama in March 2024, the Dragon Ball Super manga has been put on indefinite hiatus. A one-shot chapter that serves as a prequel to the Super Hero arc, was published on February 20, 2025. Toyotarou created it by adapting text Toriyama had written for the prequel arc, but which Toyotarou was originally unable to include in chapters 88 to 90 due to space limitations.

== Media ==
=== Manga ===
Dragon Ball Super is written by Akira Toriyama and illustrated by Toyotarou, who was previously responsible for the Resurrection 'F' manga adaptation. It began serialization in the August 2015 issue of V Jump, which was released on June 20, 2015. Shueisha periodically collects the chapters into tankōbon volumes, with the first released on April 4, 2016, and the twenty-fourth on April 4, 2025. They also publish the series digitally in English and Spanish on their international Manga Plus platform simultaneously as it is published in Japan.

Viz Media began posting free English translations of the manga chapters to their website on June 24, 2016. A print release of the first volume followed on May 2, 2017.

=== Anime ===
An anime television series adapted by Toei Animation from the same plot points used by the manga was broadcast for 131 episodes on Fuji TV from July 5, 2015, to March 25, 2018.

On January 25, 2026, it was announced that the manga's "Galactic Patrol Prisoner" story arc would receive an anime adaptation, titled Dragon Ball Super: The Galactic Patrol. Additionally, Toei is producing Dragon Ball Super: Beerus, a remastered version of the original anime that more closely aligns with the manga's story, resulting in a faster-paced series. It premiered on October 11, 2026.

=== Films ===
An animated film, Dragon Ball Super: Broly, mostly set after the "Universe Survival" story arc, was released on December 14, 2018. A second Dragon Ball Super film, subtitled Super Hero, was released on June 11, 2022.

== Reception ==
The first four volumes of Dragon Ball Super's manga adaptation have charted on Oricon's weekly list of the best-selling manga; volumes one and two sold 29,995 and 56,947 copies in their debut weeks respectively. Volume three was the fourth best-selling for its week with 92,114 copies sold, and volume four was fourth its week with 150,889. According to Nielsen BookScan, the English version of volume one was the second best-selling graphic novel of May 2017, the ninth of June, the fourteenth of July, and the eighteenth of August. Dragon Ball Super volume 4 topped NPD BookScan's graphic novels list for January 2019. In The New York Times' Graphic Books and Manga bestseller monthly list, the sixth volume ranked fourteenth for October 2019; eighth volume was fifteenth of April 2020; fifteenth volume was twelfth of February 2022; sixteenth volume was thirteenth of September; eighteenth volume was seventh of July 2023; and the nineteenth volume ranked eleventh of October.

In Japan, the manga's tankōbon volumes 1 and 2 sold 594,342 copies by June 2017, volume 3 sold 236,720 copies by July 2017, volume 4 sold 267,417 copies by November 2017, volume 5 sold 400,000 copies by April 2018, volume 6 sold 216,871 copies by June 2018, volume 7 sold 208,796 copies by September 2018, volume 8 sold 314,269 copies by January 2019, volume 9 sold 188,027 copies by April 2019, volume 10 sold 196,204 copies by August 2019, volume 11 sold 119,283 copies by December 2019, volume 12 sold 146,305 copies by April 2020, volume 13 sold 155,095 copies by August 2020, volumen 14 sold 95,101 copies by December 2020, volumen 15 sold 150,971 copies by April 2021, volume 16 sold 107,812 copies by August 2021, volume 17 sold 156,744 copies by December 2021 and volume 18 sold 193,333 copies by April 2022. According to Oricon's Yearly Sales Ranking 2020 - Top 50, Dragon Ball Super ranked at #38 with Yearly Sales - 1,019,655 Copies Sales. In April 2025, it was announced that the series had 12 million copies in circulation.

Tom Speelman of ComicsAlliance noted that Toyotarou's condensed and altered versions of the Battle of Gods and Resurrection 'F' arcs made it a lot easier to speed through and added suspense. He also said that for the first time he could not decide whether the anime or manga was superior.

Despite the series' popularity, Goku's characterization was the subject of negative feedback, with ComicVerse citing his pacifism to villains. La Tercera went to call Goku irresponsible and immature to the character for helping Moro as a result of this show of mercy and the consequences. Both Goku and Vegeta were criticized for being too overpowered in Super to the point they steal the series' spotlight to the supporting cast while their strategies either lack complexity or create a plothole such as the time limit to the fusion Vegito.
