= List of Dragon Ball characters =

A selection of Dragon Ball's extensive cast of characters at the conclusion of the manga

Dragon Ball is a Japanese media franchise created by Akira Toriyama in 1984. The franchise features an ensemble cast of characters and takes place in the same fictional universe as Toriyama's other work, Dr. Slump. While many of the characters are humans with superhuman strengths or supernatural abilities, the cast also includes anthropomorphic animals, extraterrestrial lifeforms, and deities who govern the world and the universe.

During the course of the story, protagonist Son Goku is adopted by Grandpa Son Gohan and encounters allies like Bulma, Master Roshi, and Trunks; rivals such as Tien Shinhan, Piccolo, and Vegeta; and villains such as Frieza, Cell, and Majin Buu. Goku's group of associates, known as the "Dragon Team" (ドラゴンチーム, Doragon Chīmu),^{[ch. 165]} bolsters its ranks throughout the series with the addition of former enemies and new heroes. The group is also known in Japanese as the "Z Fighters" (Z戦士, Zetto Senshi) or Team "Z" in other media, and the Earth's Special Forces in the English dub of Dragon Ball Z.

== Background ==
=== Overview ===
The Dragon Ball franchise begins in Goku's boyhood years as he trains in martial arts and explores a fantastical version of Earth (地球, Chikyū). The plot revolves around his search for the seven Dragon Balls used to summon a wish-granting dragon. The tone of the series becomes more action-oriented and less comedic as Goku reaches adulthood. He and his allies defend Earth against various threats, overcoming seemingly insurmountable opponents, and eventually emerging victorious against progressively more powerful foes.

The series also includes depictions of the afterlife and time travel as a means of creating historical divergences. Dragon Ball Super in particular expands the setting of the series to include parallel universes; the vast majority of the Dragon Ball series takes place in Universe 7, or the Seventh Universe in the English dub.

=== Concept and design ===
Akira Toriyama initially based most of the characters on those from Journey to the West: Goku from the Monkey King, Bulma from Tang Sanzang, Oolong from Zhu Bajie, and Yamcha from Sha Wujing. He also incorporated ideas from one of his earlier one-shot manga series, Dragon Boy. Toriyama explained that the reason there are many anthropomorphic characters is that he found it easier to visually differentiate them compared to human characters. For the female characters, Toriyama created women he deemed "beautiful and sexy", but also "strong". He claimed that he has trouble drawing females, which is why there are relatively few female characters in the Dragon Ball series. To advance the story quickly, he introduced Goku's signature flying nimbus cloud, later gave most fighting characters the ability to fly, and eventually granted Goku teleportation.

Many Dragon Ball characters have names that are puns, which are associated with related characters. For example, Bulma and her family are named after undergarments, members of the human-like alien race known as the Saiyans are named after vegetables, and because Frieza is a pun on freezer, the Ginyu Force are named after products that are kept in a refrigerator. A study on sound symbolism and its effect on character names conducted by researchers at Tsuda University, Tokyo discover that out of a sample size of 118 villainous characters from Dragon Ball, the consonants /g/ and /b/ were frequently used in their names and that there was a strong tendency to link "bad & male" characters with /ɡ/, which supports the notion that "a sound-meaning association can be attested in at least some phonemes" in the Japanese language. Toriyama explained that he does not like giving names to techniques and special abilities, but did so at his editor's suggestion. His wife was the one who named the series' signature Kamehameha (かめはめ波; lit. 'Kamehame Wave'), but he named all the others, even selecting them specifically for each character; saying someone like Vegeta would use names in English, and using kanji for the more sophisticated Piccolo.

The franchise's anime and film adaptations feature some original characters not created by Toriyama but by Toei Animation staff: Dragon Ball GT and the vast majority of the film adaptations and OVAs exist in their own unique continuities which branch off from the anime television series at various points, so original characters introduced in the films are usually unknown to the characters in either or both of the official anime and manga series continuities. Toriyama personally designed certain characters which made their debut appearances in animated films, as well as licensed video games such as Android 21.

== Main characters ==
Members of the Dragon Team or Z Fighters in volume 13 of the Dragon Ball Z manga series, from left to right: Vegeta, Tien Shinhan, Chiaotzu, Yamcha, Krillin, Goku, Gohan, Piccolo, and Future Trunks

The Dragon Ball series features an ensemble cast of main characters. The most prominent protagonist of the Dragon Ball series is Goku, who along with Bulma forms the Dragon Team to search for the Dragon Balls at the beginning of the series. After the truth of Goku's heritage is revealed, Saiyan characters play a central narrative role from Dragon Ball Z onwards: Bardock and Trunks from an alternate future timeline serve as the protagonists of their respective side stories, while Goku's son Gohan briefly assumes the role of series protagonist following the conclusion of the Cell Games Saga. Vegeta is featured as the co-protagonist for Dragon Ball Super.

=== Son Goku ===
First introduced as a young boy, Son Goku (孫悟空, Son Gokū) is depicted as immensely strong, pure of heart, and extremely competitive, but dedicated to defending his adopted home Earth from internal or external threats. Although he appears human, it is later revealed that Goku is a Saiyan, and that his original name is Kakarot.^{[ch. 197]}

=== Bulma ===
Bulma (ブルマ, Buruma) first appears as a teenager using the Dragon Radar, a device she created to detect the energy signal emitted by Dragon Balls. She is led to Goku's location by the signal emitted by the four-star ball in his possession and recruits him as a bodyguard while hoping to get his four-star ball to grant her wish for a boyfriend.^{[ch. 1]} She gives up on the wish after meeting Yamcha,^{[ch. 23]} and much later in the series, she marries Vegeta. Bulma has also assumed the role of inventor and has consistently provided critical tech support to Goku and his friends with their battles against various enemies and threats throughout the series. Some of her notable innovations include a microband that could make her shrink, and a time machine that brought her son from an alternate future timeline, Trunks, to the past on multiple occasions.

=== Krillin ===
Krillin (クリリン, Kuririn) is Goku's best friend and one of the most talented martial artists on Earth. A monk who shaves his head for the sake of his training, he and Goku are under the tutelage of Master Roshi;^{[ch. 28]} initially his rival but later a friend, and a loyal companion in adventures thereafter. He is killed by King Piccolo's spawn Tambourine, but is later revived by Shenron.^{[ch. 135, 165]} After the fight with the Saiyans, he travels to Planet Namek, where he is killed by Frieza.^{[ch. 317]} After being brought back to life again by the Namekian Dragon Balls,^{[ch. 329]} he helps out during the Android and Cell arcs. He is married to Android 18 and has a daughter, Marron (マーロン, Māron).^{[ch. 426, 431]}

=== Piccolo ===
Piccolo (ピッコロ, Pikkoro) is the spawn of King Piccolo, created to get revenge on Goku in the wake of his death, and subsequently assumes the role as the "evil half" of Kami.^{[ch. 161, 165]} However, after being narrowly defeated by Goku, he must team up with him and his friends when opposing the invading Saiyans, including training Goku's son Gohan.^{[ch. 193, 198, 205]} He is later revealed to be a Namekian—a demonic, green-skinned, four-fingered, hairless humanoid species who created the series' titular Dragon Balls.^{[ch. 214]} He dies sacrificing himself to protect Gohan during the fight against the Saiyan Nappa, and trains in the afterlife under King Kai before being wished back to life by the Namekian Dragon Balls.^{[ch. 223, 261, 293]} While he temporarily maintains the partnership during the fights with Frieza and the Androids, by the time of the Cell and Majin Buu arcs he accepts the fact they are allies.

=== Son Gohan ===
Son Gohan (孫悟飯) is Goku's eldest son with Chi-Chi, who first appears at the age of four.^{[ch. 196]} He is kidnapped by Goku's brother, Raditz, and locked up in a space pod. However, his temper flares and he bursts out of the space pod, dealing a blow to Raditz and knocking himself out. After the battle, Piccolo takes and trains him for a year as he realizes Gohan's potential.^{[ch. 205]} Gohan slowly becomes one of the strongest characters in the series, at one point holding his own against Frieza and eventually defeats Cell. After the Majin Buu arc, he marries Videl, with whom he later has a daughter named Pan.^{[ch. 518]}

=== Vegeta ===
Vegeta (ベジータ, Bejīta) is the last prince of the Saiyan warrior people, and the fourth generation of the Saiyan royal bloodline to bear his namesake. He is first shown conquering a planet with his partner Nappa by listening to Raditz's fight on Earth using their scouters.^{[ch. 204]} The two of them travel to Earth in search of the Dragon Balls, and he ends up fighting a newly revived Goku, but retreats after persistent attacks by Yajirobe, Krillin, and Gohan.^{[ch. 235–240]} He flees to recuperate before heading off to Planet Namek to collect its Dragon Balls before Frieza can.^{[ch. 246]} While on Namek, Vegeta proceeds to battle and kill many of Frieza's underlings. He is later forced to team up with Gohan, Goku, Piccolo, and Krillin so they can fight off Frieza. After Frieza's defeat, Vegeta lives on Earth and forms a relationship with Bulma. When the Androids arrive, it is revealed he has fathered a son with Bulma, Trunks.^{[ch. 337]} Later in the series, he and Bulma have a younger child daughter named Bra (ブラ, Bura), known as Bulla in the English dub; unlike her father and brother, and despite being half-Saiyan, she does not show any interest in fighting.^{[ch. 518]}

=== Trunks ===
Trunks (トランクス, Torankusu) first appears as a mysterious young man who easily defeats Frieza and his father King Cold prior to Goku's return to Earth from Planet Namek.^{[ch. 331, 332]} It is revealed that he is Vegeta and Bulma's future child who has traveled back in time to inform Goku of the arrival of the Red Ribbon Androids that, in his time, have killed everyone else in the Dragon Team besides Goku, who died of heart disease.^{[ch. 334, 335]} Trunks' backstory is detailed in The History of Trunks television special. He helps fight against the Androids and Cell before returning to his timeline. The character reappears in Dragon Ball Super to request assistance from the main timeline's heroes, and also appears in Super Dragon Ball Heroes.

Just as the Androids arrived, the Trunks from the series' main timeline was born.^{[ch. 337]} Seven years later as a child, Trunks, already able to turn Super Saiyan at his age,^{[ch. 429]} fights against Majin Buu by using the fusion technique with his best friend Goten to form the composite being Gotenks (ゴテンクス, Gotenkusu).^{[ch. 480]}

== Secondary characters ==
=== Master Roshi ===
Kame-Sen'nin (亀仙人; "Turtle Hermit"), also known as Muten-Rōshi (武天老師; lit "Heavenly Old Martial Arts Master"), which is rendered as "Master Roshi" in the English versions, is a lecherous elderly martial arts master instructor that lives on a small island and is the inventor of the Kamehameha technique. He trained Grandpa Gohan and Ox-King,^{[ch. 12]} Goku and Krillin,^{[ch. 28]} and a few others. He is often accompanied by his talking sea turtle companion, Umigame (ウミガメ; "Sea Turtle"), who often tries to point out his flaws. Master Roshi was trained by Master Mutaito (武泰斗), who also trained his cohortian-turned-rival Tsuru-Sen'nin (鶴仙人; "Crane Hermit"); he has also received additional training from Korin. ^{[ch. 135, 88]} When he appears anonymously in the World Martial Arts Tournament, Master Roshi uses the name "Jackie Chun" (ジャッキー・チュン, Jakkī Chun), wears a wig and discards his sunglasses.^{[ch. 46]}

=== Yamcha ===
Yamcha (ヤムチャ, Yamucha), known as Zedaki in the Harmony Gold dub, is introduced as a desert bandit alongside his companion Puar, trying to steal Goku and Bulma's Dragon Balls. He becomes nervous when near women.^{[ch. 8, 9]} He eventually becomes Goku's ally, starts a relationship with Bulma, and later becomes a pupil of Master Roshi.^{[ch. 23, 112]} His signature attack is the Rōgafūfūken (狼牙風風拳; "Wolf Fang Windy Fist"), a physical barrage of punches and palm strikes, ending with a double palm strike.^{[ch. 8]} As a result of training under Master Roshi, Yamcha is able to perform the Kamehameha and develops the Sōkidan (繰気弾; "Winding Ki Bullet"), an energy sphere directed by psychokinesis.^{[ch. 117, 175]} He also later trains under Kami to prepare for the impending Saiyan invasion, but is killed by one of their Saibamen.^{[ch. 209, 215]} Before being wished back to life by the Namekian Dragon Balls, he trained under King Kai in the afterlife.^{[ch. 261, 329]} He remains as a regular member of the Dragon Team, but gradually becomes less active later in the series.

=== Tien Shinhan ===
Tenshinhan (天津飯(テンシンハン)), named Tien Shinhan in the Funimation anime dub and also known as Shinto in the Harmony Gold dub, is first introduced, having been trained by Master Roshi's rival Master Shen, trying to kill Goku and his fellow-students.^{[ch. 113, 129]} Later, he and Chiaotzu become their allies, fighting against King Piccolo's minion until Goku arrives.^{[ch. 147, 154]} In the fight with the Saiyans, Tien Shinhan dies of exhaustion against Nappa.^{[ch. 218]} He trains in the afterlife under King Kai before being revived by the Namekian Dragon Balls.^{[ch. 261, 329]} Tien Shinhan helps out during the battles against the Androids and Cell, but for the most part does not participate in fighting until Frieza's return and later the Tournament of Power.

=== Chiaotzu ===
Chaozu (餃子(チャオズ)), Chiaotzu in the English anime dub, is a small human that resembles a jiangshi with pale skin, red cheeks, and has one hair under his hat. Although he is not physically strong, Chiaotzu is skilled with psychokinesis and telepathy.^{[ch. 116, 121]} Chiaotzu is first introduced at the 22nd World Martial Arts Tournament, having been trained by Master Roshi's rival Master Shen, trying to kill Goku and his fellow-students.^{[ch. 113]} After Tien Shinhan decides that Master Shen's teachings are wrong, the two leave him and join Goku and his companions to defeat King Piccolo. After assisting Tien Shinhan and Master Roshi in finding the Dragon Balls, Chiaotzu is killed by King Piccolo while trying to thwart his wish for eternal youth, but is later revived using the Dragon Balls.^{[ch. 147, 165]} In the battle against the Saiyans, he ineffectively self-destructs on Nappa in order to save Tien Shinhan.^{[ch. 217]} He trains in the afterlife under King Kai before being revived by the Namekian Dragon Balls.^{[ch. 261, 329]} Chiaotzu joins the other characters when they gather for Frieza's return, but Trunks kills Frieza before a fight ensues. Chiaotzu is generally no longer involved in battle from that point onwards, although he continues to train with Tien Shinhan. He is voiced by Hiroko Emori in Japanese, Rebecca Forstadt in the Harmony Gold dub, Cathy Weseluck in the Ocean dub, and Monika Antonelli in Funimation's dubs, except in Kai onwards where Brina Palencia voices him.

=== Bardock ===
Bardock (バーダック, Bādakku)—or Burdock in Viz's English manga translation—is the husband of Gine (ギネ), and the father of Raditz and Kakarrot (Goku). Bardock's story is first shown in the 1990 Dragon Ball Z TV special by Toei Animation, and is later retold in Toriyama's 2014 Dragon Ball Minus: The Departure of the Fated Child special and Dragon Ball Super: Broly. He also stars in the 2011 spin-off manga Dragon Ball: Episode of Bardock and its subsequent animated short film adaptation.

=== Android 18 ===
Android 18 (人造人間18号, Jinzōningen Jū Hachi Gō; lit. 'Artificial Human #18') is a Red Ribbon Android created by Doctor Gero, and the sister of Android 17.^{[ch. 351]} After being released, she travels with Androids 16 and 17 to find and kill Goku, though they are interrupted by Cell and the Dragon Team several times. She and 17 are eventually absorbed by Cell, but later during the Cell Games, a hard blow from Gohan causes Cell to regurgitate her. Although Krillin is unable to wish for her to be turned into a human, he is able to have her self-destruct device removed.^{[ch. 418]} She settles down with Krillin, and at some point, they have a daughter named Marron (マーロン, Māron).^{[ch. 426, 431]} 18 continues to make recurring appearances as a secondary character, and later fights for Team Universe 7 in the Tournament Of Power arc.

=== Son Goten ===
Son Goten (孫悟天) is the youngest son of Goku and Chi-Chi. When first introduced, Goten strongly resembles his father in appearance with the same hairstyle and similar clothing;^{[ch. 424]} as a teenager at the end of the series, his appearance has changed to include a shirt bearing his name and a longer, shaggier hairstyle.^{[ch. 518]} Goten was trained by his older brother Gohan in preparation for the 25th World Martial Arts Tournament, which their father attended. During the training, Gohan discovers Goten is already quite strong, as he has been training with their mother (compared to Gohan's childhood), and can become a Super Saiyan despite still being a child.^{[ch. 427]} Like several characters in the series, he can also perform the Kamehameha technique.^{[ch. 434]}

In order to save the world from Majin Buu, Goku and Piccolo teach Goten and Trunks the fusion technique, which allows them to form a single being, Gotenks (ゴテンクス, Gotenkusu).^{[ch. 480]} Gotenks battles Buu multiple times but he is unable to defeat Buu even as a Super Saiyan 3. Buu temporarily absorbs Gotenks to increase his own power, but Vegeta and Goku are able to retrieve him from Buu. When Buu destroys the Earth, Goten and Trunks are killed.^{[ch. 506]} The Dragon Balls later bring Goten back to life along with the rest of the Earth in order to give energy to Goku's Genki-Dama attack, which defeats Buu.^{[ch. 514]} Goten and Trunks appear as the protagonists of the eleventh Dragon Ball Z feature movie, Bio-Broly.

Goten is one of the most popular characters in the series. Japanese fans voted Goten the sixth most popular character of the Dragon Ball series in a 2004 poll. Goten is ranked number 13 on IGN's Top 13 Dragon Ball Z Characters List, and came in 6th place on Complex.com's list "A Ranking of All the Characters on 'Dragon Ball Z'"; Sheldon Pearce notes that the character exists mostly as part of a pair with Trunks, who is the more assertive member of the duo, and their bond makes them extremely compatible to undergo the fusion technique.

Masako Nozawa voices Goten in Japanese, while he is voiced by Kara Edwards (as a child) and Robert McCollum (as a teen) in the Funimation dub, by Jillian Michaels (as a child) and Gabe Khouth (as a teen) in the Ocean dub, and by Scott Hendrickson in the Blue Water dub. He is also voiced by Dana Hayes in the Bang Zoom! Entertainment dub of Super.

=== Beerus ===
Beerus (ビルス, Birusu) is a deity who appears in the fourteenth and fifteenth Dragon Ball Z films, as well as in Dragon Ball Super. A purple catlike being, he is a God of Destruction whose purpose is to maintain balance by destroying planets, civilizations, or external threats that put the development of the universe at risk. Son Goku transforms into the Super Saiyan God for his fight against Beerus and loses, though Beerus spares him and the Earth. Beerus later forms a team consisting of Goku, Vegeta, Piccolo, Buu, and a small, red humanoid alien named Monaka (モナカ) to participate in the Tournament of Destroyers after answering a challenge by his brother and fellow God of Destruction Champa. Beerus later forms another team consisting of notable fighters from Universe 7 to participate in the Tournament of Power, organized by the supreme deity Zeno. Since then he oversees Goku and Vegeta's training on his home planet.

=== Whis ===
Whis (ウイス, Uisu) is an angelic being who appears in the fourteenth and fifteenth Dragon Ball Z films, as well as in Dragon Ball Super. A tall teal humanoid with pronounced effeminate features, he is an Angel (天使, Tenshi), a being of extremely high status within the multiverse hierarchy. Each Angel is bound to the service of a God of Destruction of their respective universes as personal attendants and guides, rarely leaving them unaccompanied: they are tasked with supervising their deity, and may intervene to keep them in check. Whis is consistently depicted as unmatched in power and possesses tremendous speed, effortlessly defending himself against assailants. It is also revealed that he and his fellow angels possess the autonomous martial arts ability of reacting to attacks without the interference of the mind, Ultra Instinct (身勝手の極意, Migatte no Goku'i; lit. 'Secret of self-centeredness'), a technique notorious for its difficulty to master even among deities, which is foreshadowed during his training of Goku and Vegeta, then later unexpectedly, but briefly achieved by Goku in the Tournament of Power.

The character's name stems from a misunderstanding; Toriyama incorrectly believed that Beerus's name was a pun on the word "beer" and so decided to follow the same rule to name the character's assistant, naming the character Whis as a pun on "whisky" (ウイスキー, uisukī). Whis is voiced by Masakazu Morita in Japanese media and Ian Sinclair in the Funimation dub.

=== Glorio ===
Glorio (グロリオ Gurorio) is a demon gunman who appears in Dragon Ball Daima and serves as a guide and pilot for the main characters. Glorio has light blue skin and pointed ears, the latter characteristic of all demons, and he first appears as a spy in the first Demon World's palace. Following certain milestones during Goku's adventure, such as obtaining a Dragon Ball, Glorio would report their progress to Dr. Arinsu, who had secretly been his employer during the entire adventure.

During the climax of Daima, Glorio is reunited with Arinsu after she obtained the one-star Dragon Ball. While Gomah is fighting Goku, Arinsu orders Glorio to gather all of the Demonic Dragon Balls at one spot in order for her to make a wish. Since the dragon can only be summoned and wished upon in the Namekian tongue, Glorio was made to learn the language by Arinsu, who was hoping to use him to get her wish. However, Glorio instead wishes for all of the people Gomah had turned into children to turn back into adults, and is thoroughly thanked for doing this. After Majin Kuu became the new Demon King, he was granted the rank of minister.

Glorio has been compared to Han Solo from the Star Wars series due to their similarities as their group's pilots and morally grey outlaws. A scene early in Daima involving him was compared to the cantina scene from the original Star Wars film, and Glorio's ability to use lightning has also been compared to Palpatine's force lightning abilities.

== Antagonists ==
=== Pilaf Gang ===
Pilaf (ピラフ, Pirafu), Emperor Pilaf in the English anime dub, is a small impish blue creature who is the leader of the Pilaf Gang (ピラフ一味, Pirafu Ichimi) and dreams of ruling the world. He seeks the Dragon Balls to wish for world domination together with his two minions: Shu (シュウ, Shū), a humanoid dog in a ninja outfit; and Mai (マイ), a woman who resorts to weaponry and technology, and serves as a foil to the bumbling personalities of her colleagues. Shu was originally named "Soba" (ソバ) when he first appeared, but when the series was being adapted into an anime, the staff asked Toriyama what his name was and he replied with Shu instead, forgetting that he had already named him.^{[ch. 18]}^{[vol. 12:afterword]} By the time he realized the mistake, the anime had already aired, so he decided to use Shu in the manga when the character reappeared.^{[vol. 12:afterword]}

After initially succeeding in obtaining the Dragon Balls, the Pilaf Gang is foiled by Goku and his companions after Oolong's wish is granted by Shenron just before Pilaf can say his.^{[ch. 20]} The Pilaf Gang returns to antagonize Goku a few more times throughout the series when they attempt to obtain the Dragon Balls again, and when they release King Piccolo from his confinement.^{[ch. 109, 135]} Prior to the events of the fourteenth Dragon Ball Z film and Dragon Ball Super, the Pilaf Gang use the Dragon Balls to wish for the restoration of their youth, only for the wish to backfire and them being transformed into young children by Shenron. They attempt to infiltrate Bulma's birthday party to claim the Dragon Balls, but are foiled in the attempt. During the course of the Dragon Ball Super series the Pilaf Gang reform, much like several of Goku's past adversaries, and they even become Trunks' classmates at school.

Pilaf is voiced by Shigeru Chiba in Japanese, Dave Mallow in the Harmony Gold dub, Don Brown in the BLT dub, Chuck Huber in the Funimation dub, and Dean Galloway in the Blue Water dub; for Mystical Adventure, he is voiced by Mike McFarland in the Funimation dub, Sharon Mann in the AB Groupe dub, and Apollo Abraham in the Creative dub.

Shu is voiced by Tesshō Genda in Japanese, Dave Mallow in the Harmony Gold dub, Doug Parker in the BLT dub, and Chris Cason in the Funimation dub, Jonathan Love in the Blue Water dub; for Mystical Adventure, he is voiced by Brian Thomas in the Funimation dub, Jodi Forrest in the AB Groupe dub, and Nesty Ramirez in the Creative dub.

Mai is voiced by Eiko Yamada in Japanese, Melodee Spevack in the Harmony Gold dub, Teryl Rothery in the Ocean dub, Julie Franklin in the Funimation dub of Dragon Ball and Dragon Ball Z, Debbie Munro in the Blue Water dub, and Colleen Clinkenbeard in the Funimation dub from Battle of Gods onward; for Mystical Adventure, she is voiced by Cynthia Cranz in the Funimation dub, Jodi Forrest in the AB Groupe dub, and Ethel Lizano in the Creative dub. For the American live-action film Dragonball Evolution, Mai was portrayed by Eriko Tamura, and her voice was dubbed over by Yūko Kaida in the Japanese version. She also appears in the video game adaptation, voiced by Tara Platt.

=== Red Ribbon Army ===
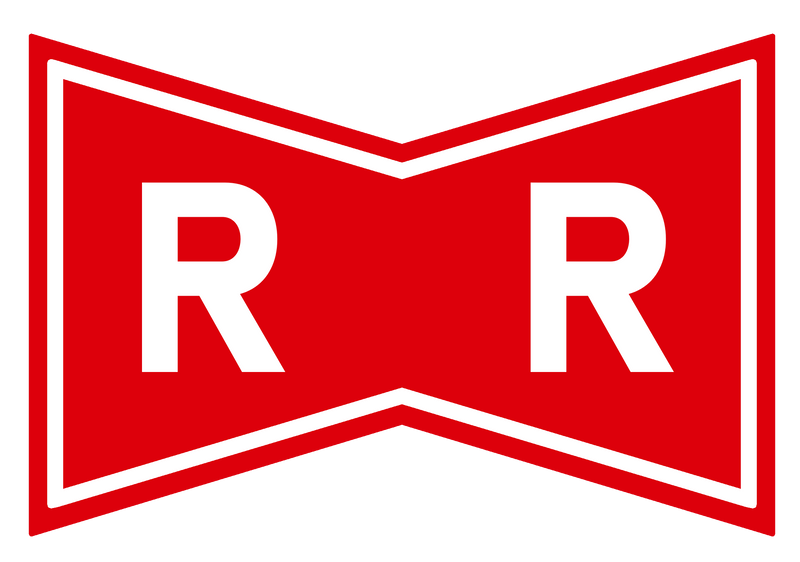
Symbol of the Red Ribbon Army

The Red Ribbon Army (レッドリボン軍, Reddo Ribon Gun) is a paramilitary organization led by Commander Red (レッド総帥, Reddo-Sōsui), who is on a quest for world domination and has his forces raid towns worldwide to search for the Dragon Balls. After Goku destroys the organization, its chief scientist Doctor Gero (ドクター・ゲロ, Dokutā Gero) continues his research and development work on powerful artificial humanoids known as Androids to seek revenge against him.

=== King Piccolo ===
King Piccolo, or Piccolo Daimaō (ピッコロ大魔王, Pikkoro Daimaō; "The Great Demon King Piccolo") in Japanese, was conceived by Toriyama as a truly evil opponent for Goku, as all his villains up to that point had something "likable" about them. He came into being when the Namekian who became Earth's guardian deity purged himself spiritually, and the negative energy took on a physical form after being cast off.^{[ch. 164]} He and the good half, Kami, are linked; if one dies, the other does as well.^{[ch. 165]} After being formed, he designates himself as the Great Demon King and terrorizes the world. He is imprisoned by Mutaito, the master of Master Roshi and Master Shen, in a rice cooker by the deadly Mafū-ba (魔封波; "Demon Seal" or "Evil Containment Wave") technique.^{[ch. 135]}

After being released by Pilaf, he attempts to kill anyone that could possibly seal him again (including Master Roshi and Chiaotzu) and uses the Dragon Balls to restore his youth before destroying Shenron, rendering them useless.^{[ch. 135, 148]} He then takes over the King of the World's palace and has the King announce him as his successor before being confronted by Goku, who, in their second battle, punches a large hole through his abdomen.^{[ch. 152, 161]} Before dying, he regurgitates the egg containing his reincarnation, Piccolo Jr., to enact his revenge.^{[ch. 161]} He is voiced by Takeshi Aono in Japanese, Scott McNeil in the Ocean dub, and Christopher Sabat in the Funimation dub. King Piccolo also appears in the American live-action film Dragonball Evolution, where he is portrayed by James Marsters; his voice was dubbed over by Hōchū Ōtsuka in the Japanese version of the film.

Before Piccolo Jr., King Piccolo created several offspring to help him with his plans. His first shown offspring, Piano (ピアノ), helps him formulate his plan until he is killed when Goku knocks King Piccolo into him.^{[ch. 156]} He also creates Tambourine (タンバリン, Tanbarin) to hunt down the contenders of the World Martial Arts Tournament to keep the sealing technique from resurfacing.^{[ch. 136]} Tambourine kills Krillin and beats a weakened Goku, but due to Goku's Saiyan physiology, the near-fatal beating raises his strength dramatically, and Goku vaporizes him with a Kamehameha in a rematch.^{[ch. 135, 136, 141]} The third, Cymbal (シンバル, Shinbaru), is created to find Dragon Balls, but he is killed and eaten by Yajirobe.^{[ch. 137, 139]} The fourth, Drum (ドラム, Doramu), is created to battle Tien Shinhan, who he easily defeats until Goku appears and crushes his head in one blow.^{[ch. 153, 154]} Piano is voiced by Masato Hirano in Japan and Sonny Strait in the Funimation dub; Tambourine is voiced by Ryūsei Nakao in Japan and Dameon Clarke in the Funimation dub; Cymbal is voiced by Daisuke Gōri in Japan and Mark Orvik in the Funimation dub; and Drum is voiced by Daisuke Gōri in Japan and Bob Carter in the Funimation dub.

=== Garlic Jr. ===
Garlic Jr. (ガーリック・ジュニア, Gārikku Junia) is a character that first appears in Dragon Ball Z: Dead Zone. His father was imprisoned by Kami in the realm of darkness, leaving Garlic Jr. with resentment and desire for revenge. He obtains the seven Dragon Balls, wishes for immortality, and begin his quest for revenge. He is defeated when Gohan pushes Garlic Jr. into the Dead Zone (デッド ゾーン, Deddo Zōn), an alternate dimension he can freely open. Garlic Jr. is one of the few original characters from the films to appear in the TV series. In the TV series, he breaks free using the Makyo Star (魔凶星, Makyō-sei; "Planet Makyo") as a power source, leading to the events of the Garlic Jr. arc. After brainwashing and transforming all living creatures of the world with the Black Water Mist (アクアミスト; lit. 'Aqua Mist'), he is trapped in the Dead Zone again after the Makyo Star is destroyed. In the original Japanese versions, Garlic Jr. is voiced by Akira Kamiya in the film and by Shigeru Chiba in the anime. He is voiced by Don Brown in the Ocean dub of the film, while Chuck Huber voices Garlic Jr. in the Funimation dub of both the film and anime.

In the film, Garlic Jr. has three henchmen named Nicky (ニッキー, Nikkī), Sansho (サンショ) and Ginger (ジンジャー, Jinjā). When he returns in the anime, Garlic is accompanied by a new group of henchmen known as the "Spice Boys", or the Four Monarchs (魔族四天王, Mazoku Shiten'nō; lit. 'Four Heavenly Kings of the Demon Clan'): Spice (ガッシュ, Gasshu; Gash) is their leader with aqua skin and white hair in a similar style to Vegeta, Vinegar (ビネガー, Binegā) is a big light purple muscular humanoid with long hair and horns. Mustard (タード, Tādo; Tard) is a muscular humanoid with brown skin, long red hair, and bull horns, and Salt (ゾルド, Zorudo; Zald) is the smallest, with red skin. All four are killed by Gohan.

=== Frieza ===
Freeza (フリーザ, Furīza), or Frieza in the English anime dub, is the self-styled emperor of Universe 7. His organization (フリーザ軍, Furīza-gun), known as "Freeza's Gang" in the Viz Media localization and "Frieza Force" in the Funimation anime dub, controls a majority of Universe 7 at the peak of its power and serves as the primary antagonistic force of the first half of the Dragon Ball Z series. Frieza employs and enslaves powerful races, such as the Saiyans, to take over suitable planets so that they can be sold to the highest bidders, or alternatively to destroy planets that are determined to be financially unviable. Frieza's forces are equipped with scouters, portable computers mainly used to measure power levels, and wear standard-issue battle armor that usually have dual shoulder guards, matching gloves and boots, and some form of skirt armor or crotch guard.

Frieza first appears on Planet Namek, where he systematically eradicates most of the native Namekian population to obtain the Dragon Balls so that he can wish for eternal life.^{[ch. 249]} It is eventually revealed that Frieza was responsible for destroying the Saiyan planet Vegeta, killing all but a few Saiyans, as he feared their power.^{[ch. 257]} He retains three of them (Vegeta, Nappa, and Raditz) as his underlings. Frieza later engages Goku and his associates in a protracted battle, with Goku transforming into a Super Saiyan after Frieza kills Krillin.^{[ch. 317]} Out of anger and frustration at his inability to counter Goku's newfound power, Frieza blasts a hole into Namek's core in order to destroy the planet.^{[ch. 320]} Frieza is then sliced in half by his own attack and begs for mercy, with Goku giving him some of his surplus energy.^{[ch. 326]} After he uses that energy to attack, Goku then seemingly kills Frieza.^{[ch. 327]} He is later rebuilt with cybernetic body parts and travels to Earth with his father King Cold (コルド大王, Korudo Daiō) and their forces to seek revenge, but all of them are easily killed by Trunks, who traveled back in time from the future.^{[ch. 331, 332]}

In Dragon Ball Z: Resurrection 'F' and the Dragon Ball Super series, one of Frieza's loyal officers named Sorbet (ソルベ, Sorube) travels to Earth along with his subordinate Tagoma (タゴマ) to resurrect their master by using Earth's Dragon Balls to summon Shenron. During a subsequent invasion on Earth, Sorbet was killed by his own master's ki blast, which was intended for Krillin but was deflected by Vegeta. Even though Frieza utilizes a powerful new form developed as a result of intensive training, Goku defeats him again and sends him back to Hell. A deceased Frieza is later recruited by Goku to participate in the Tournament of Power (力の大会, Chikara no Taikai; lit. "Convention of Power") as a member of Team Universe 7. For his contributions in the tournament. Frieza is fully revived and rejoins his subordinates.

==== Zarbon and Dodoria ====
Zarbon (ザーボン, Zābon) and Dodoria (ドドリア) are two of Frieza's top-ranking henchmen, first seen alongside their master on Planet Namek collecting the planet's Dragon Balls. Dodoria's looks brutish and vulgar, while Zarbon appears to be a handsome, long-haired humanoid alien with a refined temperament. Bulma is blinded by her attraction to Zarbon's uncommon physical beauty during their initial encounter and initially mistakes him for an ally. While their former cohort Vegeta have little difficulty dispatching Dodoria, who reveals to him that Frieza was responsible for the destruction of the Saiyan homeworld, Zarbon manages to defeat and capture him after transforming into a powerful reptilian beast after their initial encounter.^{[ch. 263]} After Zarbon retrieves Vegeta's battered body and brings him to Frieza's ship in order to heal him for interrogation, Vegeta manages to escape and steal Frieza's Dragon Balls.^{[ch. 264–266]} Zarbon fights Vegeta again, but Vegeta kills him in the rematch.^{[ch. 268]}

The duo has been referenced in Dragon Ball Super and makes cameo appearances in flashbacks. They also appear in Bardock – The Father of Goku, where Zarbon advises Frieza to destroy the Saiyan homeworld, and Dodoria massacred Bardock's teammates. In an issue of Beckett Anime, a Beckett magazine publication, Zarbon was voted as one of the top five greatest henchmen of all anime and was the only character from Dragon Ball on the list. Zarbon is voiced by Shō Hayami in the original Japanese series and Hiroaki Miura in Dragon Ball Kai and Episode of Bardock. In the English versions of the series, he is voiced by Paul Dobson in the Ocean dub, by Christopher Sabat in the Funimation dub, and by J. Michael Tatum in Dragon Ball Z Kai. Dodoria is voiced by Yukitoshi Hori in the original Japanese series and by Takashi Nagasako in Dragon Ball Kai and Episode of Bardock. In the English versions of the series, he is voiced by Paul Dobson in the Ocean dub, by Chris Forbis in the Funimation dub and by John Swasey in Dragon Ball Z Kai.

==== Ginyu Force ====
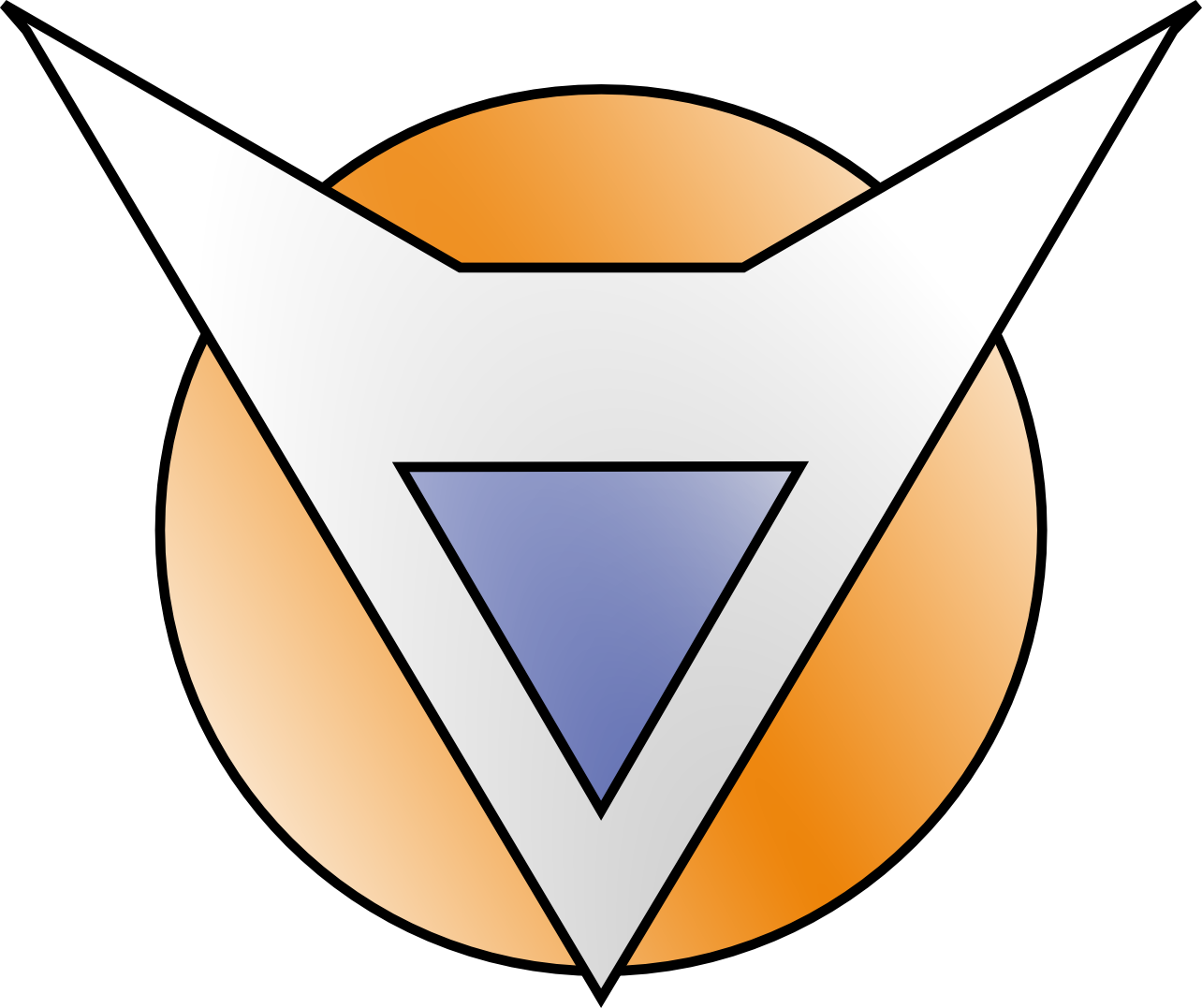
Ginyu Force logo

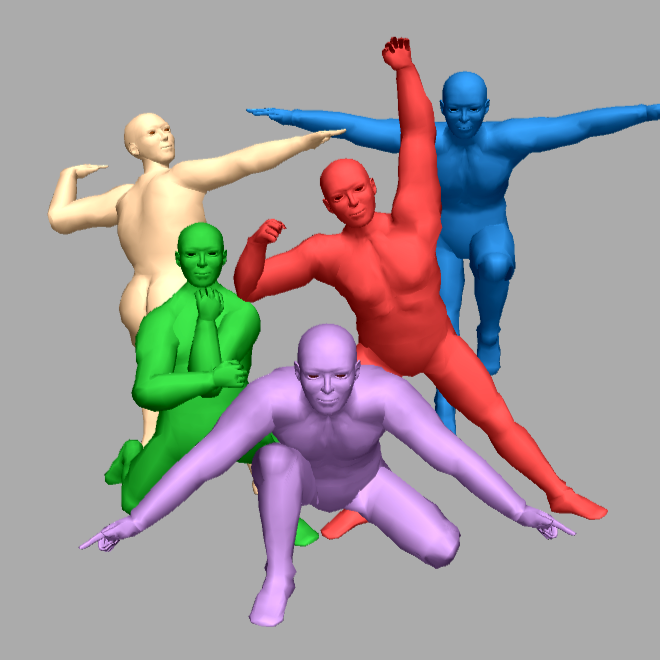
Representative poses

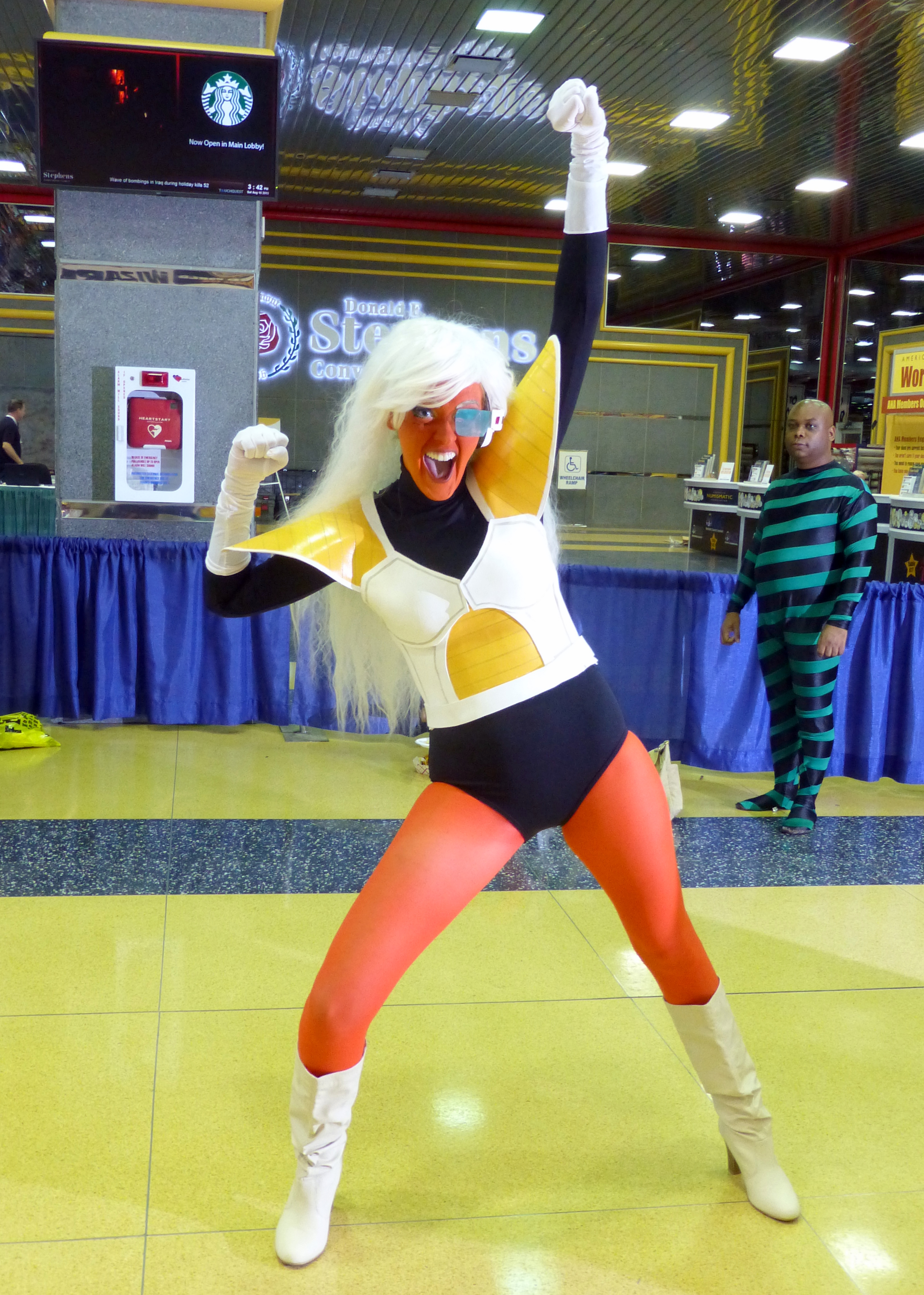
Cosplayer portraying Jeice, a member of the Ginyu Force

The Ginyu Force (ギニュー特戦隊, Ginyū Tokusentai; lit. 'Ginyu Special Squadron') is a team of five mercenaries who are hired by Frieza. The Ginyu Force and their poses were influenced from the sentai and tokusatsu television shows Toriyama watched with his children. Though physically some of the strongest individuals in the universe, the Ginyu Force's members delight in coming up with strange poses, betting candy on fights, and playing rock paper scissors. Frieza orders them to defeat Vegeta and help obtain the Dragon Balls on Planet Namek.^{[ch. 272]} In the anime, the four deceased members of the Ginyu Force (sans their leader, Captain Ginyu, who was still alive) appear on King Kai's planet in the afterlife and battle Tien Shinhan, Yamcha, and Chiaotzu.

Gurd (グルド, Gurudo), named Guldo in the English anime dub, is a fat, short, four-eyed, green-skinned humanoid who, although physically weak, has psychic powers, including the ability to freeze time for as long as he can hold his breath.^{[ch. 273]} He can also immobilize opponents and control objects with telekinesis.^{[ch. 274]} He is the first one killed when Vegeta interrupts his fight with Krillin and Gohan and decapitates him.^{[ch. 274]} Guldo is voiced by Kōzō Shioya in the original series and Yasuhiro Takato in Kai. In English, he is voiced by Terry Klassen in the Ocean dub, Dylan Thompson in Funimation's original dub, Bill Townsley in their redub, and by Greg Ayres in Kai.

Reacoom (リクーム, Rikūmu), or Recoome in the English anime dub is a sadistic, orange-haired humanoid who names his attacks after himself.^{[ch. 275]} He uses Vegeta like a plaything in their fight, defeats Krillin in one blow, and nearly kills Gohan.^{[ch. 276–278]} When Goku arrives, Recoome is defeated with a single blow before being finished off by Vegeta.^{[ch. 280, 282]} Recoome is voiced by Kenji Utsumi in the original series and Seiji Sasaki in Kai. In English, he is voiced by David Kaye in the Ocean dub and Christopher Sabat in the Funimation dub.

Butta (バータ, Bāta), named Burter in the English anime dub, is a blue-skinned reptile-like humanoid who claims to be the fastest being in the universe.^{[ch. 273]} He and Jeice attack Goku together, but Burter is incapacitated before Vegeta kills him.^{[ch. 281, 282]} Burter is voiced by Yukimasa Kishino in the original series and Masaya Onosaka in Kai. In English, he is voiced by Alec Willows in the Ocean dub, Mark Britten in Funimation's original dub, Christopher Sabat in their redub, and by Vic Mignogna in Kai.

Jheese (ジース, Jīsu), named Jeice in the English anime dub, is a white-haired, red-skinned humanoid. He and Burter attack Goku together, but flees to fetch Captain Ginyu when Burter is incapacitated.^{[ch. 281, 282]} After Ginyu switches bodies with Goku, they chase after Krillin, Gohan, and Vegeta; Jeice begins a fight with Vegeta and is killed.^{[ch. 289]} Jeice is voiced by Kazumi Tanaka in the original series and Daisuke Kishio in Kai. In English, he is voiced by Scott McNeil in the Ocean dub, Christopher Sabat in the Funimation dub, and by Jason Liebrecht in Kai.

Captain Ginyu (ギニュー隊長, Ginyū-Taichō) is a horned purple-skinned humanoid who is the leader of the Ginyu Force. He is shown to be the most tactically skilled, as he deduced that Goku was masking his true power level by simply watching him fight. After seeing Goku's increased power level when using the Kaio-ken, Ginyu inflicts a near-fatal injury on himself,^{[ch. 285, 286]} before using his technique that allows him to switch bodies with anyone, leaving Goku with Ginyu's nearly dead body.^{[ch. 286, 287]} As Goku, Ginyu momentarily deceives Krillin but has trouble fighting Krillin and Gohan when he realizes that he can not fully control Goku's power.^{[ch. 288, 289]} Ginyu then tries to switch into Vegeta's body, but Goku intervenes getting his body back, and when Ginyu tries again, he switches bodies with a Namekian frog Goku throws in the way.^{[ch. 290]} In Dragon Ball Super, Ginyu is revealed to have survived Namek's destruction and escaped to Earth, though he is still trapped in the frog's body. He takes the opportunity to swap bodies with one of Frieza's soldiers named Tagoma, but is killed by Vegeta shortly afterward. Ginyu is voiced by Hideyuki Hori in the original series and Katsuyuki Konishi in Kai. In English, he is voiced by Richard Newman in the Ocean dub, Dale Kelly in Funimation's original dub, Brice Armstrong in their redub, and by Robert Bruce Elliott in Kai.

==== Nappa ====
Nappa (ナッパ) is one of the few remaining Saiyans that were known to survive the destruction of Planet Vegeta.^{[ch. 197]} An elite Saiyan warrior, Nappa uses Saibamen (栽培マン, Saibaiman; lit. "Cultivation Man") as grunts to root out weaker opponents or to assess an opponent's power and skill level. Nappa encounters the Dragon Team after he traveled to Earth with the Saiyan prince Vegeta in search of the Dragon Balls. He survives Chiaotzu's self-destructing attack, causes Tien Shinhan to die of exhaustion, and kills Piccolo.^{[ch. 217, 218, 223]} He is defeated by Goku, who had returned to Earth after receiving intensive training from King Kai. Seeing that Nappa has been defeated, Vegeta kills him for his incompetence.^{[ch. 227]} In Japanese he is voiced by Shōzō Iizuka in Dragon Ball Z, and Tetsu Inada in Dragon Ball Kai. In English, he is voiced by Michael Dobson in the Ocean dub, and by Christopher Sabat and Phil Parsons in the Funimation dub.

==== Raditz ====
Raditz (ラディッツ, Radittsu), also known as Raditz the Runt, is a Saiyan warrior and Goku's older brother.^{[ch. 197]} Raditz is one of the few remaining Saiyans following the destruction of their homeworld, Planet Vegeta.^{[ch. 197]} He arrives on Earth, searching for his long-lost brother in order to recruit him in conquering other planets.^{[ch. 196]} When Goku refuses, Raditz kidnaps Gohan, and orders Goku to kill 100 Earthlings within a day if he wants his son back.^{[ch. 197]} Instead, Goku and Piccolo team up to defeat Raditz, though their combined powers are not enough.^{[ch. 198, 200]} Goku grapples Raditz and allows Piccolo to kill them both with his Makankosappo technique.^{[ch. 205]} Before Raditz dies, Piccolo taunts him by explaining that Goku will be revived by the Dragon Balls, though Raditz manages to send one final transmission to inform Vegeta and Nappa of this, believing that his Saiyan comrades will come to Earth and use the Dragon Balls to revive him,^{[ch. 204]} but Vegeta and Nappa travel to Earth to use the Dragon Balls for their own purposes instead. He also makes a single panel appearance in Toriyama's 2014 Dragon Ball Minus: The Departure of the Fated Child special, and a minor appearance in Dragon Ball Super: Broly. He is voiced by Shigeru Chiba in Japanese, Jason Gray-Stanford in the Ocean dub, and Justin Cook in the Funimation dub.

==== Cooler ====
Cooler (クウラ, Kūra) is the main villain in the fifth and sixth Dragon Ball Z films. He is Frieza's brother who travels to Earth to seek revenge on Goku. While he admits that he never liked his brother, he feels that he needed to punish the one that ruined his family's honor. He is defeated by Super Saiyan Goku. He returns in the sixth film after his remains combine with the Big Gete Star (ビッグゲテスター, Biggu Gete Sutā), a sentient planet-sized machine, which gives him the ability to create an indefinite amount of "Meta-Coolers" (メタルクウラ, Metaru Kūra), which have the ability to constantly repair and improve themselves. He tries to consume New Namek, but is eventually destroyed by Goku and Vegeta. Cooler appears in the Dragon Ball Z Side Story: Plan to Eradicate the Saiyans OVA and its remake, Dragon Ball Heroes: Victory Mission, a Dragon Ball spin-off manga drawn for V Jump by Toyotarou, and in the Prison Planet arc of Super Dragon Ball Heroes, an original net animation adaptation of the arcade game of the same name. He is voiced by Ryūsei Nakao in Japanese media, and Andrew Chandler in the Funimation dub. Cooler also appears as a playable character in Dragon Ball: Sparking! Zero, and appears in a what-if scenario in the games story mode.

=== Cell ===
Cell (セル, Seru) is Doctor Gero's ultimate creation, who was created to get revenge on Goku. He is an artificial life form created using the cells of several characters from the series, including Goku, Piccolo, and Frieza; as a result, Cell is able to perform techniques such as the Kamehameha.^{[ch. 363]} Cell evolves several times throughout his appearances; he originally evolves from a cicada-like form into his Imperfect form, which is still insect-like in appearance. Both his first form and his second Semi-Perfect form have a long tail that ends in a stinger-like appendage and allows him to absorb other organisms.^{[ch. 361]} The tail recedes under his wings in his final Perfect form, and he can use it to spawn Cell Juniors, minuscule childlike versions of himself. He needs Androids 17 and 18 to evolve, and when he discovers that they are already dead in his timeline, he kills the Trunks of his timeline and uses his time machine to travel back in time. He eventually absorbs both after many battles and ascends to his perfect form.^{[ch. 372, 380, 381]} He decides to hold the Cell Games (セルゲーム, Seru Gēmu), a tournament in which he fights against Earth's strongest fighters.^{[ch. 389]} Cell defeats Goku, but is eventually killed by Gohan.^{[ch. 416]}

=== Broly ===
Broly (ブロリー, Burorī) is the main villain in the films Dragon Ball Z: Broly – The Legendary Super Saiyan and Broly – Second Coming. He is depicted to be born with a power greater than most elite adult Saiyans, and is mentally unstable as an adult. He eventually becomes the "Legendary Super Saiyan" (伝説の超サイヤ人, Densetsu no Chō Saiya-jin) spoken of in legends, with his destructive tendencies only being quelled by a special controlling device created by scientists for his father, Paragus (パラガス, Paragasu).

A different version of Broly appears in the animated film Dragon Ball Super: Broly, whose backstory and physical appearance have been personally reworked by Toriyama and integrated into the series' canon continuity.

=== Majin Buu ===
Majin Boo (魔人ブウ, Majin Bū), written as "Majin Buu" in the English anime dub and translated as "Boo the Djinn" in the English manga, is a magical life form created by the witch Marba in the Demon Realm eons before the events of Dragon Ball take place, although Bibbidi ( ビビディ Bibidi) claimed to be his true creator. He was temporarily sealed by Bibbidi and brought to Earth, their next target, but Bibbidi was killed by the last surviving Supreme Kai.^{[ch. 445]} Bibbidi's son Babidi makes it his goal to revive Buu.^{[ch. 445]} Upon being released, Buu appears as an innocent-looking pudgy pink genie-like creature.^{[ch. 460]} After Buu kills Babidi, he becomes close friends with Mr. Satan, which causes him to expel his evil side^{[ch. 476, 483, 484]} that manifests into a taller and skinnier form that absorbs the fat Buu, becoming muscular and stronger.^{[ch. 485, 485]} This Majin Buu is interested in a challenge, and absorbs Goten and Trunks (as Gotenks), Piccolo, and Gohan.^{[ch. 499, 502]} It is revealed by the Supreme Kai that the fat form of Buu is the result of the original Majin Buu, known as "Pure Majin Boo (魔人ブウ 純粋, Majin Bū Junsui)," or Kid Buu in English dubs, absorbing the Dai Supreme Kai into his body.^{[ch. 508]} The original Majin Buu is a sleek, child-sized being who is obsessed with chaos and destruction; Buu reverts to this form after Goku and Vegeta remove his benevolent aspect from his body^{[ch. 507, 508]}, who then sides with the Saiyans against his original incarnation. The original Majin Buu is defeated and killed by Goku, who wishes for him to be reincarnated as a good person.^{[ch. 512, 516–518]} Ten years later, Goku encounters the reincarnation of Buu known as Uub (ウーブ, Ūbu) and handpicks him for training as his potential successor.^{[ch. 518, 519]}

==== Babidi ====
Bobbidi (バビディ, Babidi), Babidi in the English anime dub, is a madōshi (魔導師) or warlock and son of Bibbidi, the warlock who claimed to have created Majin Buu. Long after Buu is sealed away and his father is dead, he revives Buu to help him conquer the universe. Babidi is capable of taking control of someone using his magic; a large "M" appears on their forehead. Babidi takes over the minds of strong warriors in order to help him achieve his goal, including Dabura,^{[ch. 447]} alien warrior Pui Pui (プイプイ; "Pocus" in the English manga),^{[ch. 449]} light-devouring monster Yakon (ヤコン),^{[ch. 451]} and two humans, Yamu (ヤムー, Yamū) and Spopovitch (スポポビッチ, Supopobitchi). Babidi uses them to collect energy for Buu's revival, and later enlists Vegeta to help him, though Vegeta is able to ignore his orders.^{[ch. 457]} After Buu is revived, Babidi controls him by threatening to reseal him,^{[ch. 462]} though after being manipulated by Goku,^{[ch. 473]} Buu turns on him and shatters his head with a single punch.^{[ch. 475, 476]} In the anime, he appears in Hell, cheering Goku and Vegeta on during their fight with Buu. Babidi is referenced in Dragon Ball Super and appears in flashback scenes. Babidi is voiced by Jōji Yanami in the original series and Bin Shimada in Kai, Terry Klassen in the Ocean dub, and Duncan Brannan in the Funimation dub.

==== Dabura ====
Dabra, Supreme Demon King (暗黒魔界の王ダーブラ, Ankoku Makai no Ō Dābura), named "Dabura" in the English anime dub, is Babidi's mind-controlled goon. Dabura appears when Goku, Gohan, Vegeta, Piccolo, and Krillin enter Babidi's ship to aid the Supreme Kai and his attendant Kibito in preventing Majin Buu's awakening. He obliterates Kibito single-handedly, turns Piccolo and Krillin to stone by spitting at them, and helps Babidi corrupt Vegeta with a spell. When Buu awakens, he transmutes Dabura into a large cookie and consumes him, restoring his petrified victims to normal. In a filler episode of the Dragon Ball Z anime, Dabura is shown accompanying Bulma, Chi-Chi, and Videl in their search for Gohan in the afterlife. Dabura is voiced by Ryūzaburō Ōtomo in the Japanese version of the anime series. In the Ocean Group English dub, his voice is supplied by Scott McNeil, and by Rick Robertson in the Funimation English dub. His name is a pun on the phrase Abracadabra.

He was the Supreme Demon King who presided over all three Demon Worlds before Gomah succeeded him, and the latter was his vice-Supreme Demon King. His father, Supreme Demon King Abura (アーブラ Ābura) possessed the Tertian Oculus, or Evil Third Eye before him, but Dabura hired a thief to steal the artifact. By the time the thief had escaped, though, he was killed, and thus Dabura could not retrieve the item.

=== Gomah ===
Gomah (ゴマー Gomā) is the main antagonist of Dragon Ball Daima and the former Supreme Demon King who ascended following Dabura's death. He was formerly the vice-Supreme Demon King under the reign of Dabura. He is responsible for transforming the central cast into younger versions of themselves using the Dragon Balls, and appears initially as a small, imp-like clown creature wearing a red-and-black suit. Gomah is voiced by Showtaro Morikubo in the Japanese version of the anime, and Tom Laflin in the English dub.

After a servant obtained the Tertian Oculus from Hybis' belt, Gomah transforms into a monstrous version of himself by inserting the eye into his forehead. He is eventually confronted by a combined force of Goku, Vegeta, Piccolo, Shin, Glorio, Majin Kuu, Majin Duu, and Tamagami Number One, but is able to defeat them easily, even after Goku transforms into a Super Saiyan 3. Afterward, Goku transforms into a Super Saiyan 4, but it's still not enough until Glorio uses the Dragon Balls to return the main characters to their adult forms, which allows Vegeta to dominate Gomah, but Gomah uses the eye's magic to restore his own vitality and prevent Vegeta from finishing him.

Gomah is defeated by Majin Kuu in the finale of Dragon Ball Daima, and Kuu succeeds him to become the new Demon King. Gomah is sealed away alongside Degesu for 99 years by Arinsu and Marba.

==== Degesu ====
Degesu (デゲス Degesu) is the former Vice-Supreme Demon King who held the position under the reign of Gomah. He appeared in the first episode of Daima and is a member of the Glind species, as well as a sibling to both Arinsu and Nahare, the latter being most commonly known as Shin. He is voiced by Junya Enoki in Japanese and Landon McDonald in the English dub.

He is responsible for disabling Warp-sama, and ordering one of the palace's servants to obtain the Tertian Oculus from Hybis' belt. He later holds the baby version of Dende hostage, before being defeated in an ambush led by Glorio. During the incident, Degesu mentions the fact that the Glind naturally seek positions of power, which explains why they are often seen as gods in the multiverse. In the finale of Daima, he was sealed away alongside his former superior, Gomah.

=== Dr. Arinsu ===
Dr. Arinsu (ドクター・アリンス Dokutā Arinsu) is a Glind scientist working under Gomah, and an older sibling of both Degesu and Nahare. Her voice is provided by Yoko Hikasa in Japanese and Morgan Laure in the English dub.

She hired Glorio to help her obtain the Dragon Balls with the ultimate goal of betraying Gomah and becoming new Supreme Demon King. Her aim if she had attained the role was to transform the Demon Realm into a more fearsome, violent place that would rule the entire multiverse. This position put her at odds with her two siblings, particularly Nahare.

Once Goku obtained the three-star Dragon Ball, Arinsu met with the Great Witch Marba (大魔女マーバ Dai Majo Māba), who created Majin Buu, in order to create two more creatures, known as Majin Kuu and Majin Duu. Arinsu then uses the two's abilities in order to obtain the one-star Dragon Ball, which she never notifies Glorio about, and thus uses as a ransom toward Goku's group.

Afterward, during the battle with Gomah, she orders Glorio to make a wish on the Dragon Balls to make her the Supreme Demon King, but he instead wishes to return Goku and his friends to their normal size, which frustrates Arinsu, leading her to fire him. Eventually, she decides to scour the archives for a way to remove the Tertian Oculus from Gomah, and with Kuu's help she manages to discover that striking the eye's bearer in the back of the head three times consecutively would remove the eye.

After Majin Kuu defeated Gomah and became the new Supreme Demon King, he granted Arinsu the rank of Vice-Supreme Demon King, after she had turned down the chance to become the Supreme Demon King.

==== Marba ====
Great Witch Marba (大魔女マーバ Dai Majo Māba) is the witch who created Majin Buu. She later created Majin Kuu and Majin Duu under Arinsu's instructions, using the essence from Majin Buu's regenerative fragments. The two develop a brotherly bond and become a duo thanks to their complementary skillsets. After Gomah is defeated, she seals him away alongside Degesu for 99 years. Thanks to her efforts, King Kuu grants her the rank of minister. She is voiced by Mami Horikoshi in Japanese.

=== Goku Black/Zamasu ===
Goku Black (ゴクウブラック, Gokū Burakku), or simply Black, is an entity who is identical to Son Goku in appearance. He arrives on an alternate future Earth, encounters that timeline's version of Trunks, and wreaks havoc on the remaining human population for the sake of "justice" while calling himself Son Goku. Goku and his associates discover that Goku Black is actually Zamasu (ザマス), an apprentice Supreme Kai from Universe 10 of a pre-altered main timeline who despises all mortal life and hijacked Goku's body using the Super Dragon Balls. Goku Black and Zamasu from the Universe 10 of Trunks' timeline fuse into a single being using the Potara (ポタラ) earrings, and is eventually defeated by the combined effort of Goku, Trunks, and their allies. Zamasu is ultimately erased by Zeno of the alternate future time line along with the entirety of that time line's multiverse, which he had ravaged and ruined as part of Project Zero Mortals (人間ゼロ計画, Ningen Zero Keikaku; lit. 'Zero Humans Plan').

== Supporting characters ==
=== Oolong ===
Oolong (ウーロン, Ūron), named Mao-Mao in the Harmony Gold dub, is a shapeshifting, anthropomorphic pig that uses his abilities for his greedy desires. He and Puar went to the same shapeshifting school together before he was expelled for stealing the teacher's panties;^{[ch. 8]} as such, he can only change his form for five minutes at a time, requiring a one-minute break afterwards. Oolong joins Goku and Bulma to search for the Dragon Balls and eventually steal them, but abandons this plan. He makes the first shown wish with the Dragon Balls: a pair of panties.^{[ch. 20]} Oolong plays a minor role as the series progresses, where he is often in the company of Master Roshi. He is voiced by Naoki Tatsuta in Japanese, and by Alec Willows and Richard Newman in the Ocean dub. In Funimation's dubs he is voiced by Bradford Jackson, except in Dragon Ball Z Kai, where Bryan Massey voices him.

=== Puar ===
Pu'ar (プーアル, Pūaru), Puar in the Funimation anime dub, Pu-erh in their subtitles, and named Squeakers in the Harmony Gold dub, is a soft-spoken blue creature and Yamcha's companion. Puar's abilities consist of levitation and shapeshifting. He and Oolong went to the same shapeshifting school together, where he was constantly mocked by Oolong.^{[ch. 8]} When first introduced, he and Yamcha operate as bandits in a desert, where they encounter Goku, Bulma, and Oolong. At first they tail and assist the group in order to steal the Dragon Balls they are collecting, though they later reform and befriend the trio. When Goku transforms into a giant ape for the first time in the series, Puar transforms into a pair of scissors and cuts off his tail to turn him back to his regular state.^{[ch. 22]} Together with Upa, Puar defeats Dracula Man while competing in Uranai Baba's tournament.^{[ch. 99]} The character's name is a pun on pu'er tea and was designed to slightly resemble a cat.^{[vol. 2:afterword]} When questioned about gender, Toriyama disclosed that he looked at the character as male during illustrations, though the dubbed version has him as female. Puar is voiced by Naoko Watanabe in Japanese, Cheryl Chase in the Harmony Gold dub, and Kathy Morse and Cathy Weseluck in the Ocean dub. In Funimation's dubs, he is voiced by Monika Antonelli, up until Dragon Ball Z Kai onwards, where Brina Palencia voices him.

=== Chi-Chi ===
Chi-Chi (チチ) is Goku's wife, Gohan and Goten's mother, and Pan's grandmother. She and Goku first meet as children when her father, the Ox-King, asks Goku to take her to Master Roshi's house.^{[ch. 12]} In a misunderstanding, Goku promises to marry her.^{[ch. 15]} Years later, she confronts him about his promise at the 23rd World Martial Arts Tournament, and they get married.^{[ch. 171]} As the matriarch of the family, she is depicted as being overprotective of Gohan's well-being and wishes to interrupt Goku's lifestyle of fighting and constant conflict. She relaxes her stance with her younger son Goten, even training him herself.^{[ch. 427]}

=== Ox-King ===
Gyū-Maō (牛魔王; lit "Ox Demon King"), known as Ox-King in the English anime dub, is the wealthy owner of a castle on Frypan Mountain (フライパン山, Furaipan-yama) and Chi-Chi's father. He is loosely based on the Bull Demon King from Journey to the West. He was trained in martial arts by Master Roshi alongside Goku's adoptive grandfather, Grandpa Gohan. Despite his imposing name and stature, he possesses a gentle and laid-back personality in contrast to Chi-Chi. He becomes Goku's father-in-law, Gohan and Goten's grandfather, and Pan's great-grandfather. In most Japanese media Ox-King was voiced by Daisuke Gōri, while Ryūzaburō Ōtomo voiced the character for Dragon Ball Kai and Dragon Ball Super. The character was voiced by Mark Britten and later by Kyle Hebert in the Funimation dub of Dragon Ball Z, Dave Ward in the Ocean Group dub of Dragon Ball Z, and Dave Pettitt in the Blue Water dub of Dragon Ball Z.

=== Launch ===
Lunch (ランチ, Ranchi), named Launch in the Funimation dub and Marilynn in the Harmony Gold dub, is a woman who Goku and Krillin rescue and bring to Master Roshi in exchange for him to train them.^{[ch. 26, 27]} She has a split personality where she changes between a nice, polite, blue-haired woman and a trigger-happy blonde bad girl every time she sneezes.^{[ch. 26,]} As her bad form is a known criminal, she decides to stay with Master Roshi, and becomes his maid. Launch's blonde persona develops an attraction towards Tien Shinhan's fierce attitude. She is not seen after the 23rd World Martial Arts Tournament but is said to be chasing after Tien Shinhan.^{[ch. 196]} In the anime she is seen in a few Dragon Ball Z filler episodes during the fight with the Saiyans, and is seen again at the series' end helping contribute energy to Goku's Genki-Dama to defeat Buu. She is voiced by Mami Koyama in Japanese, Edie Mirman in the Harmony Gold dub, and Meredith McCoy in the Funimation dub.

=== Dr. Briefs ===
Capsule Corporation logo

Dr. Briefs (ブリーフ博士, Burīfu-hakase), sometimes written as Dr. Brief, is Bulma's father, and Trunks and Bra's grandfather. He is an elderly scientist who is one of the smartest and richest men in the world. Dr. Briefs is the founder and president of Capsule Corporation (カプセルコーポレーション, Kapuseru Kōporēshon), the largest company on Earth, and the man responsible for the invention of the Hoi-Poi Capsules (ホイ ポイ カプセル, Hoi Poi Kapuseru), which can shrink inanimate objects down to pocket-sized capsule of namesake. He is responsible for modifying the Namekian spaceship that Bulma, Krillin, and Gohan use on their journey to Namek, in the search for its Dragon Balls. He also creates a special spaceship for Goku, allowing him to train in a gravitational field 100 times stronger than Earth's. After the Dragon Team returns to Earth and prepares for the battle against the Androids, Vegeta coerces Dr. Briefs into creating a ship to allow him to train under 300x Earth's gravity. He repairs the damaged Android 16 in preparation for the Cell Games alongside Bulma. Dr. Briefs spends most of his time in his large home in West City (西の都, Nishi no Miyako), where he lives with his wife, daughter, and pets. He is voiced by Joji Yanami in Japanese. In English, he is voiced by Paul Dobson and Scott McNeil in Ocean dubs, and Chris Forbis in the Funimation dubs of Dragon Ball and Z, and Mark Stoddard in the Funimation dub from Kai onward. Dr. Briefs appears in the final chapter of Toriyama's 2013 manga series Jaco the Galactic Patrolman, which is set before Dragon Ball.

=== Korin ===
Karin (カリン), known as Korin in the Ocean and Funimation dubs and Whiskers the Wonder Cat in the Harmony Gold dub, is a Senbyō (仙猫; immortal cat) who is at least 800 years old when he is introduced in Dragon Ball.^{[ch. 88:13]} He is a minor deity who lives at the top of Karin Tower (カリン塔, Karin-tō), which is situated underneath Kami's lookout; a warrior named Bora (ボラ) and his son Upa (ウパ) live at the base of the tower and serve as its guardians.^{[ch. 88, 162]} He trained Master Roshi for three years and gave him the Kinto'un (筋斗雲) and the Nyoi-bō (如意棒) ("Nimbus" and "Power Pole" in the English anime dub respectively), both of which are later passed on to Goku.^{[ch. 88, 152, 162]} Korin trains Goku after his defeat by Mercenary Tao, and gives him poisoned water from the gods to make him strong enough to beat King Piccolo.^{[ch. 88, 151]} He is responsible for deeming people worthy of meeting Kami; Goku is the first human he has ever deemed worthy.^{[ch. 162]} He helps Goku and his friends by growing Senzu beans (仙豆, Senzu; lit. 'Hermit bean'), which can fully heal any injuries and fatigue instantly.

Korin was modeled after the pet cat that Toriyama had at the time. He is voiced by Ichirō Nagai and Naoki Tatsuta in Japanese, Paul Dobson and Ted Cole in the Ocean dub, and Mark Britten and Chris Sabat in the Funimation dub.

=== Yajirobe ===
Yajirobe (ヤジロベー, Yajirobē) is an overweight samurai that is often considered to be rude, unmannered, timid, lazy, and cowardly. During their first meeting, Yajirobe gets mad at Goku for stealing his fish,^{[ch. 138]} but has a change of heart and helps Goku after he is defeated by King Piccolo, taking him to Korin's to be healed.^{[ch. 50]} Yajirobe continues to support Goku and his companions mostly from the sidelines. He was originally a wanderer that lived off the land, but lives with Korin after meeting him. He grows Senzu Beans and delivers them to Goku and his companions. When Goku fights Vegeta for the first time, Yajirobe cuts off Vegeta's tail to turn him back to normal.^{[ch. 235]} After this story arc, Yajirobe only makes brief appearances.

When Krillin died, Toriyama requested that Yajirobe be voiced by his voice actress Mayumi Tanaka. When Yajirobe and Krillin later appeared in the same scene together, Tanaka gave the former a Nagoya dialect in order to distinguish them. He is voiced by Brian Drummond in the Ocean dub, Lucas Gilbertson in the Blue Water dub, and Mike McFarland in the Funimation dub.

=== Mr. Popo ===
Mr. Popo (ミスター・ポポ, Misutā Popo) is a genie-like entity who serves as the attendant of Earth's guardian deity.^{[ch. 163]} When he first appears, he easily gets the best of Goku in a skirmish.^{[ch. 163]} He then assists Kami in training Goku for three years in preparation for his battle against Piccolo at the 23rd World Martial Arts Tournament as well as later training Krillin, Yamcha, Tien Shinhan, Chiaotzu and Yajirobe during their preparation against the Saiyans.^{[ch. 165, 209]} Mr. Popo serves Dende as his attendant upon the latter's ascension as Earth's new guardian.

=== Namekians ===
The Namekians (ナメック星人, Namekku-seijin; lit. 'Namek Aliens'), also known as Nameks, are indigenous to the second Demon World. Following a mass exodus, a majority of Namekians spread throughout the multiverse, including to Universe 7's Planet Namek. Drawing inspiration from the Japanese word namekuji, which means "slug" in Japanese, the Namekians are a humanoid species with plant and slug-like characteristics. They possess green skin, pointed ears characteristic of demons, and antennae on their bald heads and are able to make their own set of Dragon Balls. During the events of the series, very few Namekians remain on their home planet, as most of them died a generation prior from a great calamity. While extraterrestrial in origin, the first Namekian characters encountered by Goku, King Piccolo and his mutated offspring, were known as the Demon Clan and thought to originate from Earth.

Namekians possess physiques similar to those of human males and are seen reproducing asexually by spitting an egg out from their mouths. Despite their unique reproductive abilities, there is still diversity in the species as each offspring is usually not an exact copy of their parent, like with King Piccolo, or the Great Elder (最長老, Saichōrō) who is the progenitor of every remaining Namekian on the planet prior to the events of Dragon Ball. The Great Elder, known as Guru in the English anime, abdicates his position as leader of the Namekian people in favor of Muri (ムーリ) before he dies later in the series.^{[ch. 327]}

In the sixth volume of the Dragon Ball Z manga or Namek Saga arc of the anime, Namek is terrorized by Frieza and his army. It is ultimately destroyed by Frieza as a last-ditch effort to kill Goku. All surviving Namekians are temporarily transported to Earth, where they reside for nearly a year before resettling on another planet called New Namek.

The Namekians are only known to exist in Universe 6 and Universe 7, aside from Neva who remained in the Demon Realm. Champa claims the Namekians of Universe 6 originally found the Super Dragon Balls and broke off pieces to create their own set.

==== Kami ====
Kami (神; lit. 'God') is the creator of Earth's Dragon Balls and serves as its guardian deity until the second half of the Dragon Ball Z series. The word kami is a generic term used by various characters throughout the series when referring to gods and deities in the original Japanese dialogue; this character is referred to as Kami (神様, Kami-sama), and his actual name is never revealed. He and King Piccolo were once one being, later revealed to be a Namekian, who expelled the evil inside him in order to assume the mantle of Earth's guardian deity.^{[ch. 164]} The evil incarnation, King Piccolo, terrorized Earth until he was sealed away by Master Roshi's master, Mutaito. If either Kami or King Piccolo dies, the other will as well, and the Dragon Balls cease to exist.^{[ch. 165, 207]} Before King Piccolo dies at the hands of Goku, he spawns a much stronger incarnation, Piccolo, who takes over these same traits and retains his memories. Kami later attempts to seal away the new Piccolo himself using the same technique as Mutaito and enters the 23rd World Martial Arts Tournament, possessing a human named Shen (シェン; "Hero" in the English anime dub) as a guise.^{[ch. 175, 181]} However, Piccolo learned to reverse the technique and traps Kami in a water jug instead and swallows it, before being released by Goku.^{[ch. 181, 182, 187]} During the fight against the Saiyans, Kami dies when Piccolo is killed by Nappa, but through the power of the Namekian Dragon Balls, they are both wished back to life.^{[ch. 223, 293]} During the Android Saga, Kami agrees to fuse with Piccolo, with Piccolo absorbing his energy, strength, memories, intelligence, and thought pattern.^{[ch. 356, 360]} A young Namekian named Dende later succeeds him as the new Kami. He is voiced by Takeshi Aono in Japanese, who would do so up until the Frieza arc in Dragon Ball Kai. After Aono suffered a stroke, Bin Shimada voiced the character for his final appearance during the Cell saga. In English, he is voiced by Michael Dobson and Dale Wilson in the Ocean dub and Christopher Sabat in the Funimation dub.

==== Dende ====
Dende (デンデ) is a child of the Great Elder of Namek. He was saved from Frieza's henchman Dodoria by Gohan and Krillin as a child and taken into their care.^{[ch. 255]} Dende guides Krillin to the Great Elder to tap into vast-hidden reserves of his power.^{[ch. 265]} He also interprets the Earthlings' wishes when utilizing the Namekian Dragon Balls, as the wish must be said in the native language of the Namekians.^{[ch. 292, 293, 324]} Dende later gains the power to heal injuries after having his power unlocked by the Great Elder, which he uses to aid the warriors fighting Frieza until he is killed by the tyrant for being disruptive and helping the Earthlings.^{[ch. 299, 304]} After being resurrected,^{[ch. 323]} Dende resides on New Namek until he is asked by Goku to become Earth's guardian deity.^{[ch. 393, 394]} He accepts the position, revives Earth's inert Dragon Balls, and continues to serve as Earth's guardian deity throughout the rest of the series. Dende develops a close working relationship with Piccolo, as the latter had fused with Nail (ネイル, Neiru), whom Dende was friends with, and his predecessor. He is voiced by Tomiko Suzuki in the original Japanese series up to episode 288 of Dragon Ball Z, by Hiro Yuuki in episodes 290–291 of Z, and by Aya Hirano in Dragon Ball Kai and all media since, except in Dragon Ball Daima, where a mini version of Dende was voiced by Erina Gotō. In the Funimation dubs of the series, he is voiced by Ceyli Delgadillo as a child, Justin Cook as an adult, Laura Bailey in the redub, and by Maxey Whitehead in Kai.

==== Neva ====
Neva (ネバ Neba) is an ancient Namekian with incredible magical powers. Unlike most of his kind, he never left the Demon Realm and instead inhabited the Demon Realm's version of planet Namek, wishing for the Namekians to return to the land he remained in one day. He is considered to be the legendary Namekian (伝説ナメック人 Densetsu no Namekku-jin) due to his enormous magical ability and age. He is voiced by Hiroshi Naka in Japanese and Garrett Schenk in the English Dub.

Neva improves the abilities of multiple characters during Dragon Ball Daima. During its fight with Vegeta, once Tamagami Number Two begins to lose the fight, he awakens its full power and forces Vegeta to use Super Saiyan 3. Further, during Goku's fight with Gomah, he unlocks the power of the former, allowing him to transform into a Super Saiyan 4. After Gomah is defeated by Majin Kuu, he was granted the rank of minister.

=== Mr. Satan ===
Mr. Satan (ミスター・サタン, Misutā Satan), known as Hercule in some of Funimation's dub and in Viz's English manga, is a flamboyant martial artist who becomes a world-renowned hero during the Cell Games. He attempts to fight Cell, but is swatted away; he is given credit for Cell's death by the media and celebrated as a hero.^{[ch. 421]} He later befriends Majin Buu and convinces the creature to reform, leading him to expel his evil tendencies which becomes a separate lifeform. He later helps defeat the evil version of Buu by using his celebrity influence to rally the people of Earth to contribute their energy to Goku. The benevolent incarnation of Buu later moves in with Mr. Satan and his pet Labrador Retriever Bee (ベエ, Bē), and calls himself Mr. Buu (ミスター・ブウ, Misutā Bū). Both continue to appear as recurring supporting characters in subsequent Dragon Ball media.

=== Pikkon ===
Paikuhan (パイクーハン, Paikūhan), known as Pikkon in the English anime dub, is a character who is a resident of the Other World (the afterlife in the Dragon Ball series), and first appears in the 195th episode of Dragon Ball Z and the first episode of the Other World arc, where he first encounters Son Goku and his mentor the North Kaiō. While his mentor the West Kaiō is a bitter rival to the North Kaiō, he develops a friendly rivalry with Goku after competing against each other in the Other World Tournament held in honor of the recently deceased North Kaiō. He appears again in Dragon Ball Z: Fusion Reborn as a major supporting character, and in various Dragon Ball video games. Toriyama had purposely designed the character to be similar to Piccolo in terms of appearance, role, and personality; there were memos left for the anime's production staff which specifically instructed using Piccolo as a reference for facial expressions. His popularity with the Dragon Ball fandom is noted by Screenrant's Craig Elvy; in a V-Jump survey conducted in 2017 prior to the airing of the anime adaptation of the Tournament of Power storyline, he was voted by Japanese fans as the favorite choice to replace Mr. Buu as a competitor from Universe 7. The character is voiced by Hikaru Midorikawa in Japanese media, Brian Drummond in the Ocean Dub, and Kyle Hebert in the Funimation anime dub.

=== Videl ===
Videl (ビーデル, Bīderu) is the daughter of Mr. Satan. She is a martial artist but surpasses her father in strength. She uses her abilities to fight crime in the city, and after Gohan appears as the Great Saiyaman, she quickly figures out his identity, and uses that knowledge to blackmail him into teaching her new techniques, including the ability to fly using her ki. After Buu is defeated, the pair get married and have a daughter named Pan.^{[ch. 518]} In the fourteenth Dragon Ball Z film and Dragon Ball Super, Videl participates in a ritual while pregnant with her unborn daughter to enable Goku to transform into a Super Saiyan God.

=== Marron ===
Marron (マーロン, Māron) is the daughter of Krillin and Android 18, and appears as a recurring supporting character in the Dragon Ball media series where she is usually in her mother's care. As a toddler and later young child, she resembles her father in her eye shape and apparent lack of a nose. Unlike her parents, Marron is not a martial artist and does not appear to possess any fighting ability or special powers. In Japanese media she was initially voiced by Tomiko Suzuki, by Naoko Watanabe in the TV special Yo! Son Goku and His Friends Return!! and the Battle of Gods film, and by Hiroko Ushida in Dragon Ball Z Kai and Dragon Ball Super. She is voiced by Melodee Lenz in the Funimation dub of Dragon Ball Z, by Lori Barnes Smith in the Blue Water dub, and by Tia Ballard in the Funimation dub of Resurrection 'F', Dragon Ball Z Kai, and Dragon Ball Super.

=== Panzy ===
Panzy (パンジ Panji) is a young Majin and the princess of the third Demon World. Her father is King Kadan (カダン Kadan), the ruler of the third Demon World. Panzy plays a part in the assault on Degesu when he had held a young Dende hostage. She is voiced by Fairouz Ai in Japanese and Veronica Laux in the English dub.

=== Hybis ===
Hybis (ハイビス Haibisu) is a short, bumbling soldier in King Kadan's force who enjoys dancing around. He is tasked with bringing Vegeta, Piccolo, and Bulma to the Demon Realm from Earth. During his expeditions in the third Demon World, he stumbled upon the Tertian Oculus in the middle of a field, and uses it as a belt buckle. He later trades the belt along with the eye to a servant of Gomah who gave him her green hat in exchange.

After Majin Kuu became the new Supreme Demon King, Hybis asked him if he could become a minister, but Kuu declined.

=== Tamagami ===
The Tamagami (タマガミ Tamagami) are guardians of the Dragon Balls in the Demon Realm created by Neva. They are a trio of robotic warrior beings. Tamagami Number Three wields a hammer, Number Two wields a trident, and Number One wields a sword. They each contain a Dragon Ball with a number of stars corresponding to their names.

Tamagami Number One is voiced by Hiroki Takahashi, Number Two is voiced by Hideyuki Umezu, and Three is voiced by Kenta Miyake in Japanese.

=== Majin Kuu and Majin Duu ===
Majin Kuu (クウ Majin Kū) and Majin Duu (ドゥー Majin Dū) are a pair of Majin created by the witch Marba and Dr. Arinsu using Saibaman seeds, Majin Buu's essence, and Arinsu's essence. Majin Kuu is the Supreme Demon King who rules over the three Demon Worlds, and Majin Duu is a minister.

Majin Kuu, soon after being created, challenges Tamagami Number One and loses. Due to his loss, Duu is created, and the two quickly develop a brotherly bond. Duu defeats Tamagami Number One, empowered due to a sugar rush induced by chocolate, his favorite food. Majin Kuu demonstrates his superhuman intelligence compared to not only Duu but to Arinsu as well, being able to perform math very quickly and scouring books in seconds. Duu, on the other hand, demonstrates immense power and the ability to transform his body, stretching his limbs and growing appendages.

During the final battle with King Gomah, Duu demonstrates his powers by mimicking Goku's Super Saiyan 3 transformation, after being empowered by Kuu gifting him a giant chocolate cookie. In order to find a way to defeat Gomah, Arinsu and Kuu scour the book of magical items in order to find a method to remove the Third Eye from Gomah's head. Kuu finds that hitting the holder in the back of the head three times removes the eye. Arinsu relays his findings to the others, and Goku and Piccolo resolve to defeat Gomah by following those instructions. However, the two fail, and as Gomah appears to take the upper hand again, Kuu uses the book of magical items to attack Gomah, completing the procedure and defeating him.

Following his defeat of Gomah, Kuu is crowned the new Supreme Demon King and dons a white cape similar to the former Demon Kings Dabura and Gomah. He takes on the name King Kuu (キング・ゴマー Kingu Kū) and hires several people, including Arinsu as his Vice-Supreme Demon King, and his brother Duu as a minister.

The two are initially antagonistic, and Duu briefly battles Goku before their clash is interrupted by Gomah's arrival. Duu is voiced by Fukushi Ochiai, and Kuu is voiced by Tomokazu Seki in the Japanese version.

=== Pan ===
Pan (パン) is Goku's granddaughter and Gohan and Videl's daughter.^{[ch. 518]} She appears as a young child in the final installments of the original manga and the Dragon Ball Z anime series. In Dragon Ball Z: Battle of Gods film and Dragon Ball Super, Videl, pregnant with Pan, volunteers for a ritual on behalf of her unborn daughter as a sixth Saiyan participant is required. In Japanese media she is voiced by Yūko Minaguchi. In the English versions of Dragon Ball Z, she is voiced by Brenna O'Brien in the Ocean dub and Kate Bristol in the Funimation dub. In the English-language adaptations of Dragon Ball GT, she is voiced by Caitlynne Medrek in the Blue Water dub, with Mariette Sluyter voicing her as an elder, and Elise Baughman voices her in the Funimation dub. Baby/Little Pan is voiced by Jeannie Tirado in Super.

=== Jaco ===
Jaco Teirimentenpibosshi (ジャコ・ティリメンテンピボッシ, Jako Tirimentenpibosshi) is an alien galactic patrolman who is the main character of Jaco the Galactic Patrolman, a manga by Toriyama set before the events of Dragon Ball. Jaco arrives on Earth as a member of the Galactic Patrol, a cosmic police force that is led by the Galactic King (銀河王, "Gingaō") and tasked with keeping order throughout the Milky Way Galaxy, to prevent it from being threatened by an evil alien. He fails to track down the alien, who turns out to be Goku, but befriends Bulma's older sister Tights (タイツ, "Taitsu") and returns to space. He appears in the fifteenth Dragon Ball Z film, and becomes a recurring character in Dragon Ball Super. Jaco is voiced by Natsuki Hanae in Japanese and by Todd Haberkorn in English.

=== Future Mai ===
During the Goku Black arc of Dragon Ball Super, an alternate future version of Mai (未来のマイ, Mirai no Mai) who had grown older after being de-aged by Shenron is depicted as a leader of the resistance forces on Earth against Goku Black. As a close friend and potential love interest of her timeline's Trunks, they work closely with their allies from the main timeline to defeat Goku Black and foil his Zero Mortal Plan. This version of Mai appears as a supporting character in Super Dragon Ball Heroes. Future Mai is voiced by Eiko Yamada in Japanese and Colleen Clinkenbeard in English.

== Other recurring characters ==
=== Arale Norimaki ===
Arale Norimaki (則巻アラレ, Norimaki Arare) is a little girl android built by the scientist Senbei Norimaki in Penguin Village (ペンギン村, Pengin Mura) from Toriyama's previous manga Dr. Slump. Arale is often accompanied by two cherubs known as the Gatchans that can eat almost anything and shoot lasers from their antennas. Goku meets her during his final encounter against General Blue of the Red Ribbon Army, and she easily defeats him.^{[ch. 81–83]} Arale also appears in the third Dragon Ball film where she defeats Mercenary Tao. In Dragon Ball Super, she defeats Vegeta when being controlled by her creator's archenemy Dr. Mashirito, and appears to be evenly match against Goku.

=== Fortuneteller Baba ===
Uranai Baba (占いババ, Uranai-baba; lit. 'All-seeing Crone'), Fortuneteller Baba in the English anime dub, is an old witch and Master Roshi's older sister.^{[ch. 101]} She possesses a magic floating crystal ball that she rides on top of, which she can use to see the location of any lost item^{[ch. 97]} and to see into the future. She is also able to travel to the afterlife, where she recruits deceased individuals and brings them back to the living world to fight for her, though only for one day.^{[ch. 108]} She lives in a big palace located over an oasis in the desert. She normally charges a very high price for her services unless her team of fighters is defeated.^{[ch. 98]} Her regular fighters are Dracula Man (ドラキュラマン, Dorakyura Man; "Count Dracula" in Viz's manga and "Fangs" in the English anime dub), boxing vampire; Suke-san (スケさん; "Invisible Man" in Viz's manga and "See-Through" in the English anime dub), an invisible man who is weak with his only advantage being that he can not be seen; Mummy-kun (ミイラくん, Miira-kun; "Mummy" in Viz's manga and "Bandages" in the English anime dub), a mummy with brute strength; and Devilman (アックマン, Akkuman; "Devil" in Viz's manga and "Spike" in the English anime dub), a humanoid devil who can destroy people using the evil in their hearts.^{[ch. 99–104]} When Goku and his friends visit her to find the last Dragon Ball after the Red Ribbon Army's defeat, his adoptive grandfather Son Gohan is the last of her fighters, temporarily brought back to the real world to see his grandson.^{[ch. 108]} She makes recurring appearances, including bringing Goku back to life for one day for the 25th World Martial Arts Tournament.^{[ch. 230]} In Japanese she is voiced by Junpei Takiguchi in Dragon Ball and early Dragon Ball Z, and by Mayumi Tanaka during the latter half of Dragon Ball Z and during Dragon Ball Kai. In English, she is voiced by Ellen Kennedy in the Ocean dub, and by Linda Chambers-Young in the Funimation dub.

=== Fusion characters ===
A recurring theme in the Dragon Ball series is characters created through the process of merging two or more separate beings into one. The idea to have two characters fuse together was suggested by Toriyama's long-time friend and fellow manga artist Masakazu Katsura, leading to the introduction of amalgamations of characters formed through various techniques. In the anime, the resulting fused characters tend to be depicted as speaking with a dual voice consisting of both participants' voices.

The Fusion (フュージョン, Fyūjon) technique, first introduced during the Majin Buu arc, is a ritual dance developed by an alien species called the Metamorans which Goku learned in the Other World. The purpose of this technique is to temporarily merge two or more bodies into a single, superior entity with characteristics from both participants. The newly fused body is dressed in Metamoran attire: a dark-colored vest lined with light-colored linen, white pants with a cloth belt, and boots. When the ritual dance is performed properly, the single being created possesses an astounding level of power, far beyond what either participant would have had individually by combining each other's attributes from strength and speed to reflexes, intelligence, and wisdom. The fusion only lasts for 30 minutes, after which the participants revert to their normal selves. Notable examples of composite characters created with this technique include Gotenks (ゴテンクス, Gotenkusu), the fusion of Goten and Trunks; and Gogeta (ゴジータ, Gojīta), the fusion of Goku and Vegeta.

Two individuals wearing a single matching Potara (ポタラ) earring but on opposite ears can trigger a Potara Fusion (ポタラの合体, Potara no Gattai). These earrings, usually worn by the Supreme Kai and their aides, combine both users into a new body, as well as an increase in power and personality that is greater than the sum of the two individuals. However, there are alternate methods of dissolving the fusion regardless of whoever the participants are, usually by forcing them apart (such as being magically split through a wish granted by Shenron). Notable examples of composite characters created by wearing a matching pair of Potara earrings include Kibito Kai, a fusion of Kibito and the East Supreme Kai of Universe 7; Vegito (ベジット Bejitto), a fusion of Goku and Vegeta, also known as Vegerot in the Viz English manga; and Kefla (ケフラ Kefura), a fusion of Caulifla and Kale. Mortals have a one-hour time limit before they separate, but if a deity is one of the participants, the fusion is permanent; the deity known as the Old Kaiōshin (老界王神, Rō Kaiōshin) is a fusion of the original East Supreme Kai from 15 generations prior (15代前の東の界王神, Jūgo-Dai mae no Higashi no Supreme Kai; lit. "A God of a Boundary King of the East of 15 Generations Before") and an old witch who stole one of his Potara earrings and put it on without being aware of the consequences.

The Namekians demonstrate a related technique early in the Dragon Ball Z series, where one Namekian absorbs the energy, strength, memories, and intelligence or thought patterns of another through a process akin to assimilation (融合, Yūgō). Each participant must willingly consent to fuse in this manner and usually, the pair agrees to the stronger of the two serving as the host's body. The agreed host places his hand over the chest of the other one and through unknown means, merge with a blinding flash. Only the body of the host remains in the aftermath, and the non-host is assimilated and ceases to exist as a body. The current incarnation of Piccolo is a notable example, having assimilated two other Namekian individuals into his being. Villainous characters like Cell and Majin Buu are also capable of forcibly absorbing other characters in order to acquire greater power by taking advantage of their unique physiology. Cell would absorb both Androids 17 and 18 to reach his perfect form, while Buu would absorb Gotenks, Piccolo, and Gohan.

=== Grandpa Gohan ===
Grandpa Son Gohan (孫 悟飯 じいちゃん, Son Gohan Jīsan; FUNimation "Grandpa Gohan", Viz "Son Gohan"), is the adoptive grandfather of Son Goku, whom he found in a crashed spaceship.^{[ch. 197]} Having originally studied under Master Roshi and learned the Kamehameha technique from him, he adopts Goku and teaches him martial arts.^{[ch. 12, 106]} He warns Goku not to look at the full moon, but Goku disobeys him and accidentally kills him while on a rampage in his giant ape form.^{[ch. 21, 233]} Goku does not learn this until Vegeta turns into an ape and tells Goku about the transformations.^{[ch. 233]} He is brought back to life for one day by Baba Uranai to fight Goku and see his growth as a martial artist.^{[ch. 108]} Goku later names his first son Gohan in his grandfather's honor.^{[ch. 196]} In the anime, he later appears as an assistant to Annin (アンニン), the ruler of the "magical furnace". He is voiced by Osamu Saka in the Japanese version of the original series, Kinpei Azusa in Bardock: The Father of Goku, and Shigeru Chiba in Dragon Ball Kai. In the Funimation dub of the series, he is voiced by Christopher Sabat. He is portrayed by Randall Duk Kim in the American live-action film Dragonball Evolution; his voice was dubbed by Hiroya Ishimaru in the Japanese version. Grandpa Gohan briefly appears in the final chapter of Jaco the Galactic Patrolman, which is set before Dragon Ball.

=== Kai ===
The Kaiō (界王), referred to as Lords of Worlds in Viz's English manga and the Kai in the English anime dub, are upper-level gods of the Dragon Ball multiverse.^{[ch. 205]} There are five at a time; one presiding over each of the four quadrants of the universe and the last, the Dai Kaiō (大界王; "Great Lord of Worlds"), overseeing them all.^{[ch. 440]} The Kai reside in the heavens and are responsible for the lower-level deities who rule over individual planets. Above the five Kais there are Supreme Kai, or Lords of Lords, who are in charge of the Kai.^{[ch. 440]} It is possible for an individual Kai to be promoted to the rank of the Supreme Kai after a period of training as an apprentice; for example, Zamasu was the former North Kaiō (北の界王, Kita no Kaiō) of Universe 10 prior to being chosen by the ruling Supreme Kai of Universe 10 as his apprentice and eventual successor.

The North Kai of Universe 7, named King Kai in the English anime dub and as the Lord of the Northern Galaxy in the Viz Media localization,^{[ch. 323]} trains Goku after his self-sacrifice to defeat Raditz, and eventually trains Yamcha, Tien Shinhan, Chiaotzu, and Piccolo. He is the only other Kai to appear in the original manga besides the South Kaiō (南の界王, Minami no Kaiō),^{[ch. 428]} and as such is usually simply referred to as Kaiō-sama (界王様), the Lord of Worlds (in the Viz Media localization),^{[ch. 205]} or King Kai. King Kai trains dead fighters that were allowed to keep their bodies if they manage to reach his small planet at the end of Serpent Road (蛇の道, Hebi no Michi; "Snake Way" in the English anime dub).^{[ch. 205]} Before training any students, he forces them to appeal to his strange sense of humor and catch his pet monkey Bubbles (バブルス, Baburusu);^{[ch. 210, 211]} in the anime, they must also hit the flying cricket Gregory (グレゴリー, Guregorī) with a mallet. King Kai provides Goku with martial arts training and two of his own techniques: the Genki-Dama (元気玉) and the Kaiō-ken (界王拳), which he himself was never able to master.^{[ch. 212, 227]} He continues to help Goku and his friends throughout the series, lending his planet locating and telecommunicating abilities for their use. When Goku brings a self-destructing Cell to his planet, the explosion kills King Kai and Bubbles, and destroys his planet.^{[ch. 412, 413]} As he is already in the afterlife, he only gains a halo, and in the anime appears to settle down on the Dai Kai's planet. He is voiced by Jōji Yanami in Japanese media until episode twelve of Dragon Ball Super, where Naoki Tatsuta took over the role, Don Brown and Dave Ward in the Ocean dub, Sean Schemmel in the Funimation dub, and Michael McConnohie in the Bang Zoom! Entertainment dub.

=== King Vegeta ===
King Vegeta (ベジータ王, Bejīta Ō), also known as Vegeta III (ベジータ三世, Bejīta Sansei; lit. "Vegeta the Third"), is the last king of the Saiyans (サイヤ人, Saiya-jin). He is the father of the Saiyan princes Vegeta and Tarble. He led the Saiyans, who have historically lived a violent lifestyle where they raid other planets, to victory in the ten-year war against the Tuffles (ツフル人, Tsufuru-jin), after which the Tuffles' home planet was renamed Planet Vegeta (惑星ベジータ, Wakusei Bejīta) in his honor. After the Saiyans were annexed by Frieza as a vassal state, he had no choice but to pledge allegiance to him, though he retains power over his people as a vassal. King Vegeta is eventually killed by Frieza, who later destroys his home planet and commits genocide against the entire Saiyan race. In Dragon Ball Z: Battle of Gods and in both the anime and manga versions of Dragon Ball Super, King Vegeta is seen in flashbacks depicting his encounter with Beerus during the latter's visit to Planet Vegeta. In Japanese, he is voiced by Banjō Ginga in episode 78 of Dragon Ball Z, Yukimasa Kishino in episode 124, and Masaharu Satō in the eighth Dragon Ball Z film. Terry Klassen voices him in the Ocean dub, while Christopher Sabat voices him in the Funimation dub.

=== Shenron ===
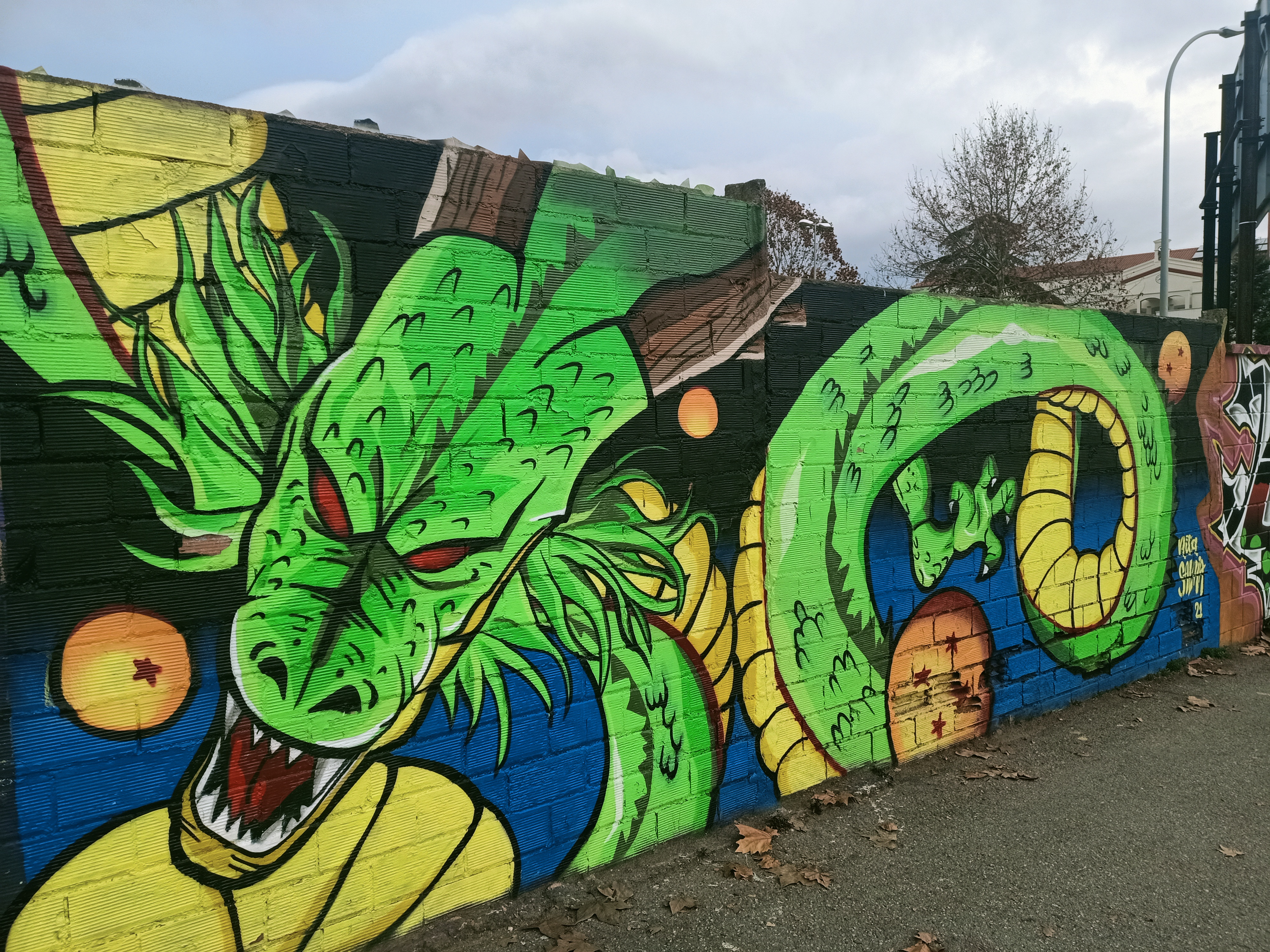
Graffiti of Shenron in Vic, Catalonia, Spain

Shénlóng (神龍, Shenron; lit. 'God Dragon'), Shenron in Funimation's anime dub, also known as the Eternal Dragon in the Ocean and Funimation dubs and as the Dragon God in the Harmony Gold dub, is the wish-granting dragon summoned when all seven of Earth's Dragon Balls are gathered together.^{[ch. 1]} Throughout the series, several rules on the Dragon Balls' use and limitations on Shenron's power are explained. After the wish is granted the balls scatter across the planet, turn to stone, are useless for a year, and cannot be detected by Bulma's Dragon Radar.^{[ch. 1, 20]} The Dragon Balls also become useless if Shenron is destroyed; in this case, they must be recreated by their creator. If their creator is killed, the Dragon Balls will also become inert until another creator is able to revive Shenron.^{[ch. 148, 165, 194]} Shenron cannot bestow a wish that exceeds the power of his creator, such as Shenron being unable to destroy the Saiyans before they came to earth.^{[ch. 243]} Midway through the series, the Dragon Balls are revealed to have been created by the Namekians, Earth's Kami being one of them.^{[ch. 242]} A person can only be brought back to life once, and only if that person did not die of natural causes.^{[ch. 218, 321]} Earth is without Dragon Balls for a period when Kami re-merges with Piccolo until Dende takes over the position of God.^{[ch. 355, 360, 393]} When Dende recreates Earth's Dragon Balls, he makes it so that two wishes can be made at once, but each wish is still capable of resurrecting multiple individuals immediately.^{[ch. 394]} Shenron is voiced by Kenji Utsumi in the Japanese version of the series until his death in 2013 with the exclusion of episodes 192 and 193 in the series and the films, in which he is voiced by Masaharu Satō; Kōji Yada in the Dr. Slump remake; and Ryūzaburō Ōtomo since episode 97 of Kai. In the English versions of the series, he is voiced by Don Brown in the Ocean dub, and by Christopher Sabat in the Funimation dub.

Shenron's Namekian counterpart is Porunga (ポルンガ; Namekian for "God of Dreams").^{[ch. 292]} Porunga has a large, muscular humanoid upper body and a dorsal fin down his back; the Dragon Balls are larger than Earth's. Unlike Shenron, he can only bring a single person back to life at a time, but he can bring that person back multiple times whereas Shenron cannot.^{[ch. 292, 327]} He can also grant three wishes instead of one, and the user must speak in the Namekian language.^{[ch. 292]} Porunga and the Namekian Dragon Balls were created by the planet's Great Elder, who kept one ball and gave each of the other six to a different elder.^{[ch. 252, 260]} When the Namekian Dragon Balls are used in the fight with Majin Buu, Porunga is upgraded, and can wish back multiple people at once and still grant three wishes.^{[ch. 513]} Porunga is voiced by Junpei Takiguchi in the Japanese version of the series with the exclusion of episode 283, in which he is voiced by Daisuke Gōri; he is voiced by Masaharu Satō in the video games. In Dragon Ball Kai Daisuke Gōri originally performed the role; after his death, Ryūzaburō Ōtomo took over. He is voiced by Christopher Sabat in the Funimation dub of the series.

Dragon Ball Super introduces Super Shenron (超神龍, Sūpā Shenron) and the Super Dragon Balls which are spread throughout Universes 6 and 7. The Super Dragon Balls were created by the Dragon God Zalama (ザラマ, Zarama), are the size of planets and have no restrictions on their wishes, although they only grant one and it must be spoken in the language of the gods. The Namekians took fragments of the Super Dragon Balls to create their own version on Namek. Super Shenron is voiced by Ryūzaburō Ōtomo in Japanese and Christopher Sabat in English.

=== Supreme Kai ===
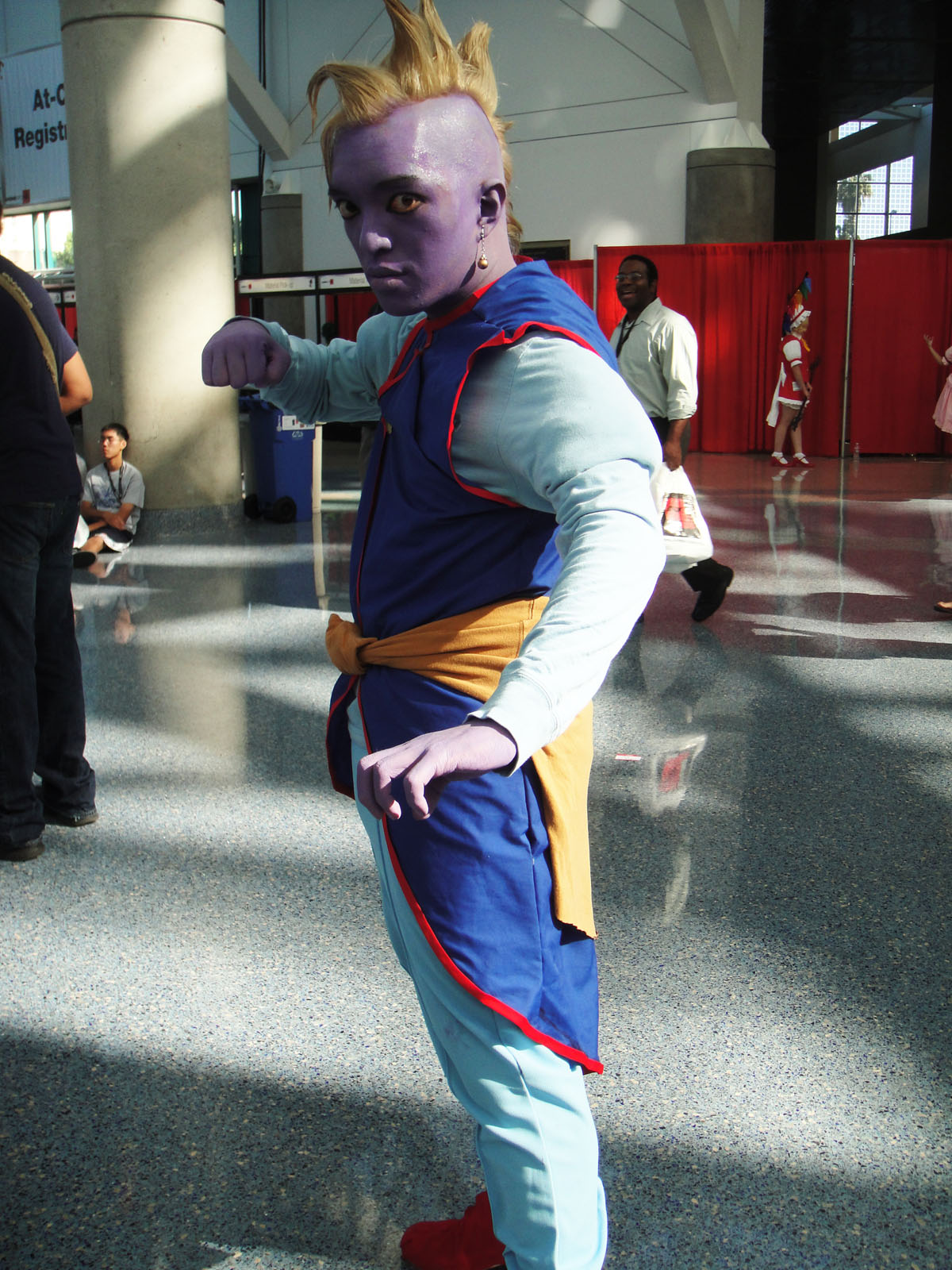
Cosplayer portraying a Supreme Kai

The Glind (グリンド人 Gurindo-jin), also known as Kaiōshin (界王神), referred to as Lords of Lords in Viz's English manga and the Supreme Kai in the English anime dub, are a demonic species and some of the highest-level deities in the Dragon Ball canon. They stand alongside the Gods of Destruction, but below the Angels, Grand Priest, and Omni-King. The Glind originate from the second Demon World, but many chose to leave and become the gods known as Supreme Kai in the multiverse. Some, such as Degesu, chose to remain in the Demon Realm. The Glind are all naturally genderless, although use gendered terminology and pronouns, and are born from Glind trees in the second Demon World. They also are naturally inclined to seeking high positions of power, for better or for worse. While the Kai watch over the living world, the Supreme Kai watch over both the Other World (the afterlife in the Dragon Ball series) and the living world. The Supreme Kai are known for recruiting mortal beings to become their disciples; Gohan and Trunks trained under their universe's Supreme Kai to prepare for threats like Majin Buu and Dabura and gained access to healing powers in the process. The Supreme Kai and their followers wear a pair of earrings known as the Potara (ポタラ), which allow two individuals to fuse together and permits the Supreme Kai to use a Time Ring. In Dragon Ball Super, the Gods of Destruction are introduced and are equal in status to the Supreme Kai. Supreme Kai act as "creation gods" (創造神, sōzōshin) by providing the energy for the creation of new planets and species, while the Gods of Destruction destroy planets or entire civilizations when appropriate to maintain the balance of the universe they oversee.

==== Universe 7 ====
There were originally five Supreme Kai in the Seventh Universe, and four of them ruled over each of the four quadrants of the universe, and a fifth, the Dai Kaiōshin (大界王神, "Great Lord of Lords"), ruled over them in turn.^{[ch. 445]} Prior to the events depicted in Dragon Ball, all but one met their fate at the hands of Majin Buu. The Dai Supreme Kai was absorbed by Buu, who then takes a chubby form with an uncanny resemblance to the deity. The Dai Supreme Kai's spirit continues to manifest within Buu, his benign influence somewhat dulling the creature's destructive nature. ^{[ch. 445]}

The East Kaiōshin (東の界王神, Higashi no Kaiōshin), originally the ruler of the eastern quadrant of Universe 7, became the de facto ruler of the entire universe as a result of the demise of his peers.^{[ch. 445, 440]} His true name is Nahare (ナハレ Nahare), and he is the sibling of Arinsu and Degesu, the three originating from the same Glind Tree in the Demon Realm. He has purple skin and a white mohawk, as well as pointed ears due to being a demon, and is always accompanied by his attendant Kibito (キビト). In the Dragon Ball manga he comes to Earth under the alias "Shin" (シン) to meet Goku and his friends, and recruit them to stop Babidi from reviving Buu.^{[ch. 438, 446, 460]} After failing to prevent Buu's return, Gohan is taken to the Supreme Kai's faraway planet (界王神界; lit. "Realm of the Lord of Lords"), where he is given the Zeta Sword (ゼットソード, Zetto Sōdo) ("Z Sword" in the English anime dub) and put to training. The sword is accidentally broken during Gohan's training, releasing an ancestor of the East Supreme Kai. He uses his power to increase Gohan's and his own life force to resurrect Goku, who decides to remain in the afterlife after his death by a self-destructing Cell. The elder Supreme Kai, referred to as the Old Kaiōshin (老界王神, Rō Kaiōshin), remains by his descendant's side as an advisor following Majin Buu's defeat and makes recurring appearances in subsequent Dragon Ball media.^{[ch. 471, 479]}

Kibito and the East Supreme Kai become permanently fused into one being, known as Kibitoshin (キビト神) in the manga and as Kibito Kai in the anime, via their Potara earrings.^{[ch. 501]} Kibito Kai assists in the final battle with Buu by teleporting Goku and the last survivors on Earth onto his planet and helps take Dende to New Namek to use its Dragon Balls to revive Earth and its people.^{[ch. 508, 513]} Between Dragon Ball Z and Dragon Ball Daima, the two unfuse using Majin Buu's mysterious gases that had also unfused Vegito.

Nahare is voiced by Yūji Mitsuya and Shinichirō Ōta in Dragon Ball Super and Battle of Gods. In English, he is voiced by Kent Williams in Funimation's English dub and Michael Dobson in the Ocean Group dub.

Kibito is voiced by Shin Aomori in most media, with the only exception being in Dragon Ball Daima, where he voiced by Yūsuke Handa. Kibito is voiced by Don Brown in the Ocean Group dub, and by Chuck Huber in the Funimation dub.

The Elder Kai is voiced by Reizō Nomoto in Dragon Ball Z and by Ryōichi Tanaka in Dragon Ball Super and Battle of Gods. Tetsuya Iwanaga provides the voice for Elder Kai's younger self in flashbacks. In English, he is voiced by Scott McNeil in the Ocean dub, Steve Olson in the Blue Water dub, and Kent Williams in the Funimation dubs.

==== Universe 10 ====
Gowasu (ゴワス), known as Gowas in the manga, is the ruling Supreme Kai of Universe 10. Gowasu chose Zamasu to be his successor. Unlike many of his peers from the other Universes, he does not resent Goku or view him as being disrespectful. Gowasu, along with his counterpart from Universe 7, traveled to an alternate future world where Zamasu ravaged the world to assist Goku and his associates in dealing with his former apprentice. During the Tournament of Power arc, Gowasu recruits members to fight on behalf of Universe 10, recording and uploading their exploits on a channel known as "GodTube".

Gowasu is voiced by Tetsuo Goto in the Japanese version and by Garrett Schenck in the Funimation dub.

=== Universe 6 inhabitants ===
Universe 6 (第6宇宙, Dai roku Uchū), also known as the Challenging Universe (挑戦の宇宙, Chōsen no Uchū), is the sixth of the twelve parallel universes introduced in Dragon Ball Super. The God of Destruction is Champa, the Supreme Kai Fuwa (フワ), and the Angel Vados. Universe 6 and Universe 7 are linked as twin universes, and any planets or species that have existed and/or exist in Universe 6 will exist or are likely have existed in Universe 7, and vice versa.

For example, the Saiyan people also exist in Universe 6, but their fates are completely different compared to their Universe 7 counterparts: they live relatively peaceful lives on their homeworld Sadala (サダラ, Sadara), and were never enslaved or eliminated by their enemies. Instead of conquering other planets, the Saiyans of Universe 6 tamed their desire to battle for good, and use their skills to protect the civilizations of their universe from danger and unrest. Characters from this universe were the first outside of Universe 7 to be introduced when other universes were revealed.

==== Auta Magetta ====
Auta Magetta (オッタ マゲッタ, Otta Magetta) is a Metalman from Universe 6. In the Tournament of Destroyers, he competed in a tournament against Universe 7. He fights Vegeta where his lava-spewing abilities started to heat up the ring. After breaking the barrier, Vegeta recovers from the overheating and knocks Auta Megetta out of the ring. In the Tournament of Power, Auta Magetta helps Frost attack Vegeta and Master Roshi. Vegeta manages to knock him out of the ring after insulting him.

Auta Magetta is voiced by Naoki Tatsuta in the Japanese version.

==== Botamo ====
Botamo (ボタモ, Botamo) is a tall yellow humanoid bear from Universe 6 with rubber skin that can withstand any punch. In the Tournament of Destroyers, he faces off against Goku in the tournament against Universe 7. Goku has a hard time landing a blow on Botamo until he grabs him by the arm and throws him out of the ring. In the Tournament of Power, Botamo fights Gohan, whose punches lift him off the ground until it was enough for Gohan to use the Kamehameha to blast Botamo out of the ring.

Botamo is voiced by Yasuhiro Takato in the Japanese version and by Cris George in the Funimation dub.

==== Cabba ====
Cabba (キャベ, Kyabe) is a Saiyan from Planet Sadala, and an elite member of the Sadala Defense Forces, first introduced in Dragon Ball Super. Planet Sadala is also the original homeworld of the Saiyans of Universe 7, but according to Vegeta, it had been destroyed by internal discord long ago and no longer exists. Unlike the arrogant and savage nature exhibited by the vast majority of Saiyans from Universe 7, Cabba is presented as a good-natured and humble individual who speaks respectfully to everyone and sees himself as a protector of the weak. As one of Universe 6's strongest warriors, he is recruited to join Champa's team during the Tournament of Destroyers. Cabba bonds with Vegeta following the events of the tournament and looks up to him as a mentor, despite them fighting for opposing teams.

He is voiced by Daisuke Kishio in the Japanese version of the series. In the Funimation English Dub, his voice is supplied by Clifford Chapin.

==== Caulifla and Kale ====
Caulifla (カリフラ, Karifura) and Kale (ケール, Kēru) are a pair of Saiyans from Universe 6. In Dragon Ball Super, they are introduced as representatives of Universe 6 in the Tournament of Power. Later in the Tournament, they fuse together into a single being known as Kefla (ケフラ, Kefura) using a pair of Potara earrings gifted to them by their universe's Supreme Kai but are ultimately defeated by Goku in his Ultra Instinct form.

==== Champa ====
Lord Champa (シャンパ, Shanpa) is Beerus's twin brother and the God of Destruction of Universe 6, which is linked with the Seventh Universe as its "twin universe". He has a long-running rivalry with Beerus, and they often bicker or engage in acts of one-upmanship like food contests and proxy wars. During the Universe 6 Saga, Champa holds a fighting tournament known as the Tournament of Destroyers; he forms a team by gathering the strongest warriors from Universe 6 to challenge Universe 7, which consists of Hit, Cabba, Frost, Botamo, and Auta Magetta.

Champa is voiced by Mitsuo Iwata in the Japanese version of the series. In the Funimation dub, his voice is provided by Jason Liebrecht.

==== Frost ====
Frost (フロスト, Furosuto) is the ruler of an empire based in Universe 6, and hails from the same race of beings as Universe 7's Frieza. He is first introduced in Dragon Ball Super as a competitor for his universe during the Tournament of Destroyers. Unlike Frieza, he is apparently perceived in a positive light by the majority of his subjects in Universe 6.

Frost's characterization differs between the manga and anime adaptions of Dragon Ball Super: in the anime he is a malevolent being like Frieza, while the manga depicts him as amoral and unsportsmanlike. In the anime, Frost faces off against Goku, Piccolo, and Vegeta in successive rounds in the tournament and defeats Goku and Piccolo by cheating and using his secret poison; Goku is allowed to return to the tournament after this is revealed and Frost is defeated by Vegeta. He is eventually exposed as a devious manipulator who feigns benevolence as well as being a space pirate and planet broker that discreetly profits from warmongering activities in his universe. In the manga, there is no mention of Frost being involved in criminal activities nor any indication of him being evil, and he appears to have a genuinely pleasant personality. He is indifferent to accusations of being a dirty fighter for using his poisonous stingers, as the tournament offers no prize money and the battles are ultimately pointless according to his perspective.

Frost is voiced by Ryūsei Nakao in the Japanese version of the series. In the Funimation English Dub, his voice is supplied by Greg Ayres.

==== Hit ====
Hit (ヒット, Hitto), also known as Hit the Infallible (百発百中のヒット, Hyappatsuhyakuchuu no Hitto) and as the Legendary Assassin (伝説の殺し屋, Densetsu no Koroshi-ya), is an assassin from Universe 6 introduced in Dragon Ball Super. He is known for using his signature Time-Skip (時とばし, Toki-Tobashi) ability to manipulate time and for his capability to eliminate his assassination targets with a single strike. Over a millennium old, he is the strongest member of his universe's team during the Tournament of Destroyers. Hit eventually rebels against Champa and throws his fight against Monaka (モナカ), the weakest participating member of the opposing Universe 7 team whose true purpose is to motivate Goku, by eliminating himself in the final match of the tournament.

In Japanese, Hit is voiced by Kazuhiro Yamaji. In the English dub, he is voiced Aaron Roberts in Dragon Ball Xenoverse 2 and by Matthew Mercer in all subsequent appearances.

==== Vados ====
Vados (ヴァドス, Vadosu), Whis' sister, is an Angel from Universe 6 who is Champa's attendant and martial arts teacher. Like Whis, her name is also derived from an alcoholic drink, Calvados (カルヴァドス, karuvadosu). In Dragon Ball Super, she is first seen accompanying Champa while searching for the Super Dragon Balls; they succeed in obtaining six of the seven Super Dragon Balls prior to the Tournament of Destroyers. Vados openly displays concern with Champa's physique and health problems, and often teases him for being overweight, blaming his weight issues as the cause of his low stamina and his difficulty in keeping up with her training. She is also shown to be polite and respectful, even when addressing lesser beings or those who are not from her universe, such as Goku.

Vados is voiced by Yuriko Yamaguchi in the Japanese version. In the English version, Vados is voiced by Caitlin Glass in the Funimation English dub, and by Wendee Lee and Tamara Ryan in the Bang Zoom! dub.

=== Universe 11 inhabitants ===
Universe 11 (第11宇宙, Dai jūichi Uchū), also known as the Justice Universe (正義の宇宙, Sēgi no Uchū), is the eleventh of the twelve parallel universes introduced in Dragon Ball Super. Universe 11 is linked with Universe 2 as twin universes. The Pride Troopers (プライドトルーパーズ Puraido Torūpāsu) are a powerful superhero team who operate in this universe; they work under their God of Destruction, and the most elite Pride Troopers made up the entirety of Team Universe 11 participating in the Tournament of Power, where their combined strength is portrayed as the biggest threat faced by Team Universe 7.

==== Belmod ====
Belmod (ベルモッド, Berumoddo), known as Vermoud in the English localization of the Dragon Ball Super anime, is a slender humanoid in clown makeup and the God of Destruction of Universe 11. He dislikes evil and is proud of the Pride Troopers' work. Toppo is his candidate for God of Destruction when Belmod retires. He is usually accompanied by his attendant and martial arts teacher Marcarita.

Belmod is voiced by Masami Kikuchi in the Japanese version and by Markus Lloyd in the Funimation dub.

==== Jiren ====
Jiren (ジレン), also referred to as "Jiren The Gray" (灰色のジレン, Haiiro no Jiren), is a member of the Pride Troopers. His quiet, stoic demeanor is a glimpse of his solitary nature; he is haunted by his past losses and desperately tries to undo it all by forging his own path of justice. While fighting for justice, he has no loyalty to anyone beyond himself, believing that trusting others will ultimately backfire. Jiren is very proud of his strength and refuses to accept the help of his comrades even in dire moments when he is under severe pressure from his opponents.

==== Toppo ====
Toppo (トッポ), known as Top in the English localization of the Dragon Ball Super anime, is the tall and burly leader of the Pride Troopers, who act as guardians of peace within Universe 11 and form the majority of participants representing Universe 11 in the Tournament of Power. Toppo is a candidate to become Universe 11's next God of Destruction, being the second most-powerful mortal within his home universe after Jiren.

Top is voiced by Kenji Nomura in the Japanese version and by Ray Hurd in the Funimation dub.

==== Dyspo ====
Dyspo (ディスポ, Disupo) is the Sphynx cat-like blitz captain of the Pride Troopers. In the Tournament of Power, he uses his own super-speed when fighting Hit before retreating. During his fight with Frieza, Dyspo also fights against Gohan who sacrifices himself to get Dyspo out of the ring.

Dyspo is voiced by Bin Shimada in the Japanese version and by Christopher Dontrell Piper in the Funimation dub.

=== Zeno ===
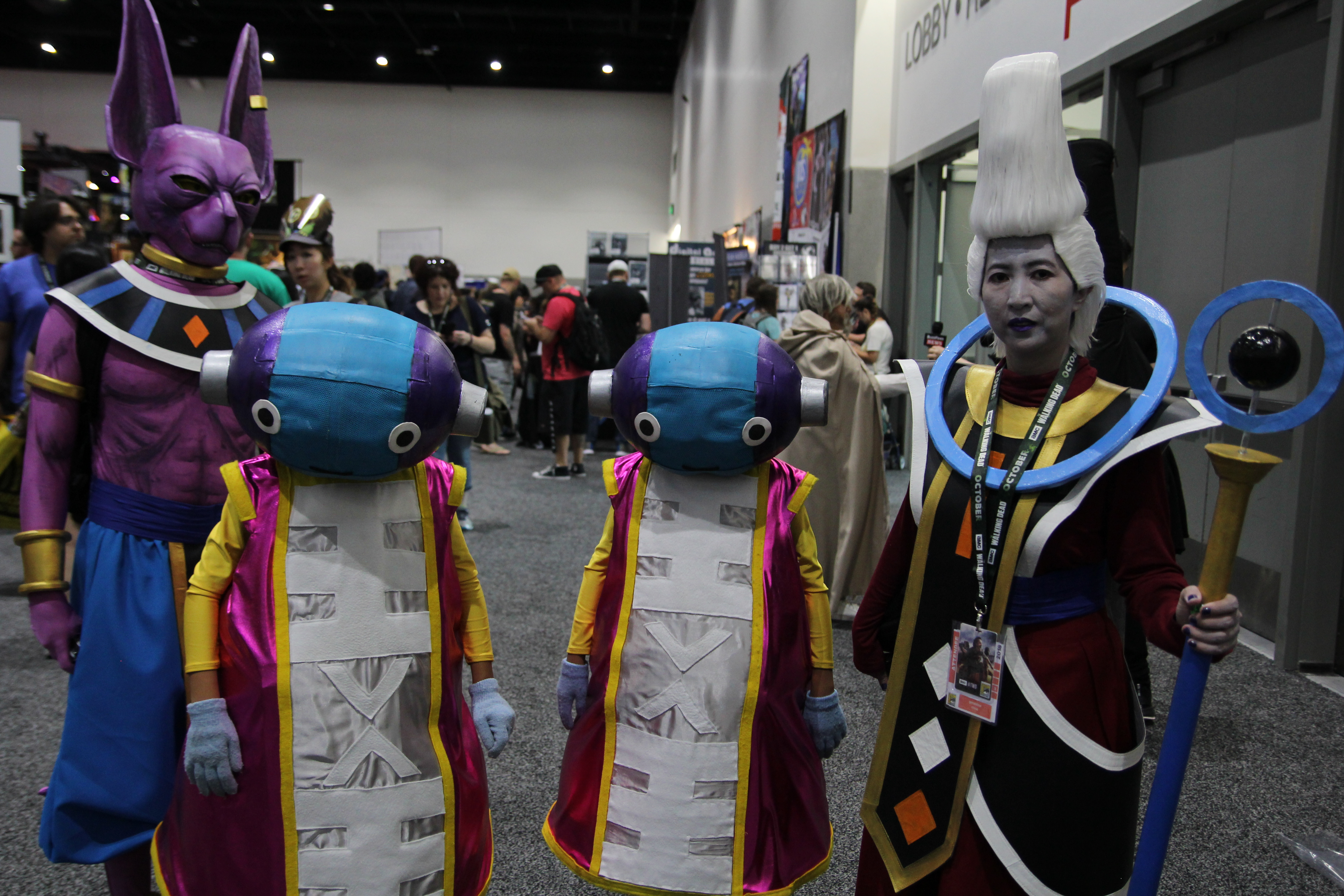
Cosplay of Zeno

Grand Zeno (全王, Zen'ō; lit. 'King of All'), also known as the Omni-King and as the Lord of Everything in Viz's English manga, is the supreme deity of the whole Dragon Ball multiverse. Depicted as a childlike humanoid figure, Zeno ranks above all other mortals and gods in the series and is treated with utmost reverence and fear, as he has the power to erase entire universes from existence at will. He is served by a pair of identical-looking attendants and is advised by the Grand Minister. First appearing during the aftermath of the Tournament of Destroyers between Universes 6 and 7, he is addressed by his subjects as Zen'ō-sama (全王様) in original Japanese media and as Grand Zeno or the Omni-King in the English dub. Goku is a notable exception; he befriends and addresses Zeno in a casual manner ("Zen-chan" (全ちゃん)) in the original Japanese, "Zenny" in the English dub), which is considered disrespectful and lacking in etiquette by most characters in the series, though Zeno took to Goku and his outgoing friendliness almost immediately after they first met. As of the "Future" Trunks Saga, there are two coequal Zenos in the present time line. Zeno is voiced by Satomi Kōrogi in Japanese and by Sarah Wiedenheft in English.

==== Grand Minister ====
The Grand Minister (大神官, daishinkan), also known as the Grand Priest in Viz's English manga, is the principal advisor and a guiding figure to Zeno as well as the father of all twelve Angels. He is responsible for enforcing Zeno's decrees and welcoming guests to the supreme deity's residential palace. Additionally, the Grand Minister served as the referee of the Zeno Expo and the Tournament of Power.

The character is voiced by Masaya Takatsuka in the Japanese version and by Josh Grelle in the Funimation dub.

== Merchandise ==
Official and unofficial merchandise were released based on characters from the series, including key chains, action-figures, plush toys, T-shirts, tumblers and trading cards. Characters from the series also appear in licensed video games.

== Cultural impact ==
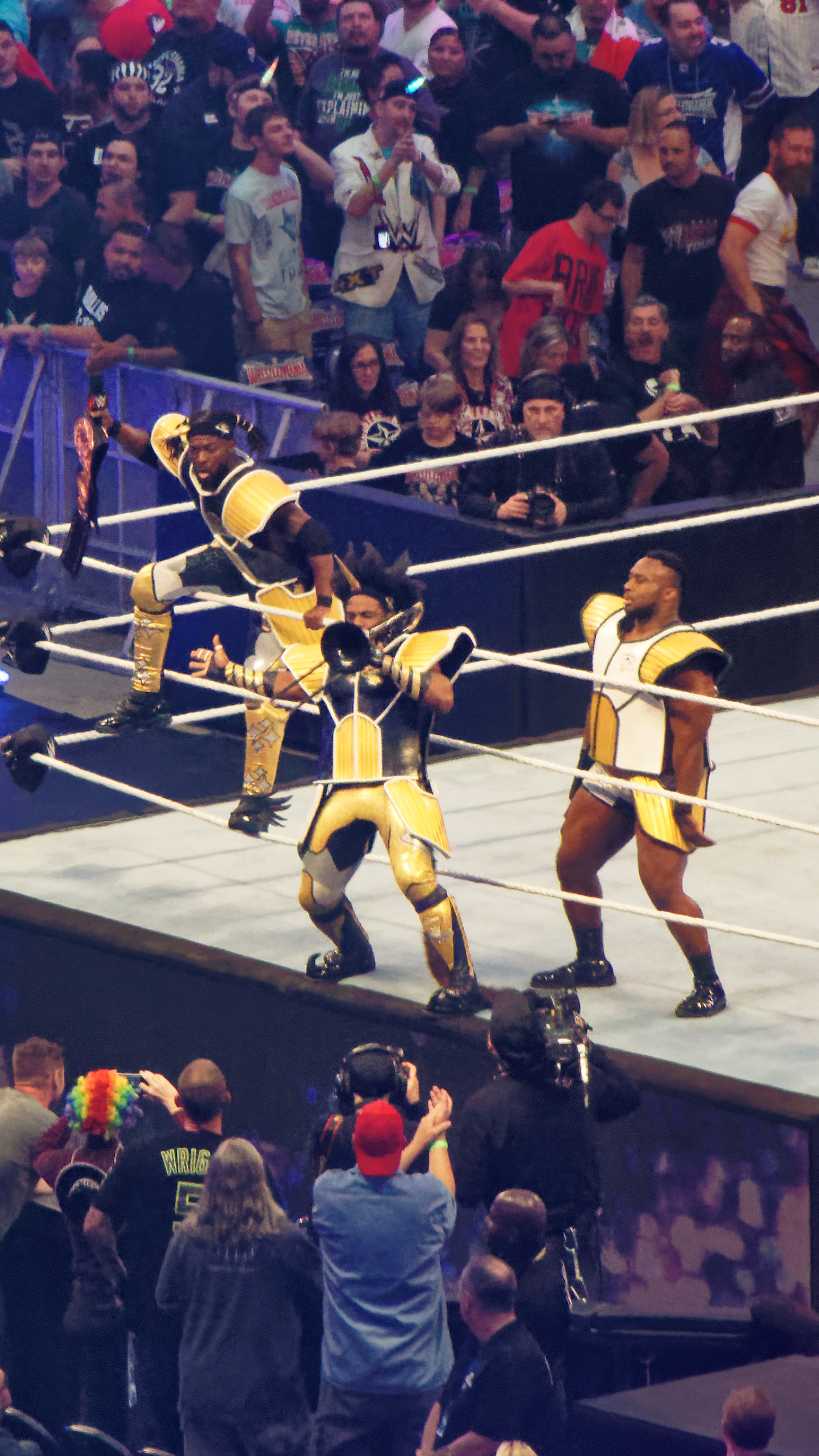
The New Day dressed in Saiyan armor costumes

=== Fandom ===
Several celebrities and professional athletes from around the world have made references to characters from the Dragon Ball series. For example, American UFC fighter Marcus Brimage cited the Dragon Ball Z series as one of his inspirations for taking up mixed-martial arts. The New Day appeared in full costumes patterned after Saiyan armor at WWE's WrestleMania 32 as a part of their entrance for a match against The League of Nations. Argentine professional footballer Eduardo Salvio often celebrates his goals with gestures and signals referencing the signature attacks of various Dragon Ball characters.

=== Critical reception ===
Carl Kimlinger of Anime News Network (ANN) stated, "Few anime series have mainstreamed it the way Dragon Ball Z has. To a certain generation of television consumers its characters are as well known as any in the animated realm, and for many it was the first step into the wilderness of anime fandom." His colleague Allen Divers praised the story and humor of the manga for being very good at conveying all of the characters' personalities. Carlo Santos, also from ANN, commented that the Dragon Ball cast "may not be as stylish-looking as today's shonen adventure protagonists, but every character has a distinctive set of physical features, making them identifiable at any moment". DVD Talk's Todd Douglass praised the "deep, insightful, and well-developed" characters, writing "[f]ew shows can claim to have a cast quite like Dragon Ball's, and that's a testament to the creative genius of Toriyama." Tim Jones of T.H.E.M. Anime Reviews commended the series for having good characterization, saying: "You do care about them, and want to get to know more about them." He considered them to be different from stereotypical stock characters, but noted that they have much more development early on than when compared to later in the series.

Theron Martin, also from ANN, wrote that while the characters are not complicated, they are "easy to love, hate, and respect", and are a major reason for the series popularity. For example, he described the "immense pride of Vegeta", and how that can be a fatal flaw, especially shines through, as do the freewheeling spirits of Goten and Trunks, the naiveté of Buu and Mr. Satan's attention-loving, glory-hound nature, while Number 18 shows a cunning side. He also praised the themes from the warriors, saying they speak to "basic yet powerful themes like faith, confidence, heroism, sacrifice, love, and understanding what is truly worth fighting for", and the ways they react while fighting, although the fights can sometimes become very long with little plot development. On the other hand, the handling of the series' major female characters, such as Chi-Chi, Bulma and Videl, have been subject to some criticism. Martin felt that the series overused the plot device of having characters "grow seemingly untouchably powerful, only to be put out when eventually upstaged".
