= Monika Antonelli =

American actress

Monika Antonelli (born February 17, 1959) is a voice actress and librarian best known for voicing Puar and Chiaotzu in the Dragon Ball anime series, as well as earlier video games and other media for the franchise from 1999 to 2008. Before Dragon Ball, she was a librarian for the Denton Public Library in Denton, Texas and was the voice of the library's mascot, Whiffles the Bunny.

Antonelli currently resides in Mankato, Minnesota.

== Voice roles ==
=== Television series ===
- Dragon Ball – Puar, Chiaotzu, Pudding, Cupcake, Turbo Norimaki, Additional Voices
- Dragon Ball Z – Chiaotzu, Puar, Chiko, Additional Voices
- Dragon Ball Z: The History of Trunks – Puar
- Dragon Ball GT – Puar, Chiaotzu (Flashbacks)
- Dragon Ball GT: A Hero's Legacy – Chiaotzu, Puar

=== Movies ===
- Dragon Ball: Sleeping Princess in Devil's Castle – Puar, Launch (Nice Form)
- Dragon Ball: Mystical Adventure – Chiaotzu, Puar
- Dragon Ball: The Path to Power – Puar
- Dragon Ball Z: The Tree of Might – Chiaotzu, Puar
- Dragon Ball Z: Bojack Unbound – Chiaotzu, Puar
- Dragon Ball Z: The History of Trunks – Puar

=== Video games ===
- Dragon Ball Z: Budokai – Puar, Chiaotzu
- Dragon Ball Z: Budokai 3 – Chiaotzu, Puar
- Dragon Ball Z: Budokai Tenkaichi – Chiaotzu
- Dragon Ball Z: Budokai Tenkaichi 2 – Chiaotzu
