= Tomiko Suzuki =

Japanese voice actress

- 鈴木 富子
- Born: January 3, 1956; Aichi Prefecture, Japan
- Died: July 7, 2003 (aged 47)
- Occupation: Voice actress
- Agent: Aoni Production

Tomiko Suzuki (鈴木 富子, Suzuki Tomiko, January 3, 1956 – July 7, 2003) was a Japanese voice actress who was born in Aichi Prefecture and was affiliated with Aoni Production at the time of her death. Suzuki's last film was Pokémon: Jirachi Wishmaker (where she voiced the protagonist Pokémon: Jirachi), released only a week and half after Suzuki's death from a heart attack on July 7, 2003, at the age of 47.

== Filmography ==
- Maeterlinck's Blue Bird: Tyltyl and Mytyl's Adventurous Journey - Spirit of the Sugar (1980)
- Ikkyū-san – Mokunen (1975–1982)
- Miss Machiko – Hiroshi (1981–1983)
- Captain Tsubasa – Yayoi Aoba (1983–1986)
- Fist of the North Star – Lin (1984–1986)
- Ganbare, Kickers! - Kakeru Daichi (1986-1987)
- Dragon Ball – Additional Voices (1986–1989)
- Dragon Ball: Curse of the Blood Rubies – Pansy (1986)
- Saint Seiya – Yakov (Jacob, Hyoga's young friend) (1986–1990)
- Dragon Ball Z – Dende, Marron, Bee (1989–1996)
- Dragon Ball GT – Marron (1996–1997)
- Transformers: The Headmasters – Daniel Witwicky (1987–1988)
- Pokémon: Jirachi Wishmaker – Jirachi (2003)
