= List of Dragon Ball anime =

Dragon Ball anime series created by Akira Toriyama

Dragon Ball is a Japanese media franchise created by Akira Toriyama in 1984. Seven anime installments based on the franchise have been produced for television by Toei Animation: Dragon Ball (1986–1989); Dragon Ball Z (1989–1996); Dragon Ball GT (1996–1997); Dragon Ball Z Kai (2009–2015); Dragon Ball Super (2015–2018); Dragon Ball Daima (2024–2025); and Dragon Ball Super: Beerus (2026), as well as a web series, Super Dragon Ball Heroes (2018–2024). Since 1986, twenty one theatrical animated films based on the franchise have been released: four based on the original Dragon Ball anime, fifteen based on Dragon Ball Z, and two based on Dragon Ball Super. There are also several television specials that were broadcast on Fuji TV and two short films, which were shown at the 2008 Jump Super Anime Tour and Jump Festa 2012 respectively. A two-part hour-long crossover TV special between Dragon Ball Z, One Piece, and Toriko aired on Fuji TV in 2013. Additionally, there is a two-part original video animation created as strategy guides for the 1993 video game Dragon Ball Z Side Story: Plan to Eradicate the Saiyans, which was remade in 2010 and included with the Raging Blast 2 video game.

As with the franchise's anime television series, all 21 films and the first three TV specials were licensed in North America by Funimation. In Europe, AB Groupe licensed the first three Dragon Ball movies, the first nine Z movies, and the first two TV specials.

Dragon Ball is one of the most successful franchises in animation history. The anime series is broadcast in more than 80 countries worldwide. In the United States, the anime series has sold more than 30 million DVD and Blu-ray units as of 2017.

== TV series ==
No.	Japanese title	English	Episodes	Japanese release	English releases
1	Doragon Bōru (ドラゴンボール)	Dragon Ball	153	February 26, 1986 – April 19, 1989	January 1–5, 1990 (Harmony Gold dub); January 5, 1992 – December 11, 1994 (NGN subtitled broadcast) (Note: Available in Hawaii and California only) c. April 18, 1995 – ? (Creative Products Corp. dub); September 9 – December 2, 1995 (BLT dub); August 20, 2001 – December 1, 2003 (Funimation dub); September 1, 2003 – March 9, 2005 (Blue Water dub) c. July 2006 – ? (Animax dub)
2	Doragon Bōru Zetto (ドラゴンボールZ)	Dragon Ball Z	291 (Note: Cut to 276 episodes in Funimation's original North American broadcast)	April 26, 1989 – January 31, 1996	c. 1993 – c. 1996 (First English dub on RPN 9); December 1, 1994 – August 8, 2000 (NGN subtitled broadcast); September 13, 1996 – April 7, 2003 (Note: The debut date varied significantly across regional TV networks at the time – with most networks airing the first episode during the weekend of September 14–15, but some as early as the 12th.) (Funimation (Note: This dub was recorded at Ocean Productions before Funimation switched to an in-house cast in 1998. Both versions were produced by Funimation, though they are sometimes listed separately.) dub) c. January 2001 – May 7, 2003 (Westwood dub continuation); June 14 – October 10, 2005 (Funimation's Ultimate Uncut)
3	Doragon Bōru Jī-Tī (ドラゴンボールGT)	Dragon Ball GT	64 (Note: Cut to 49 in Funimation's original North American broadcast)	February 7, 1996 – November 19, 1997	August 14, 2000 – March 26, 2001 (NGN subtitled broadcast); March 3 – June 30, 2003 (Blue Water dub); November 7, 2003 – January 29, 2005 (Funimation dub)
4	Doragon Bōru Kai (ドラゴンボール改(カイ))	Dragon Ball Z Kai	167 (Note: Only 158 episodes were broadcast in Japan. Episode 98 was not broadcast due to the 2011 earthquake, and the Final Chapters episodes were edited down heavily due to scheduling conflicts. The complete 167 episode version was only released internationally. The Japanese home media release includes episode 98, but uses the shorter cut of The Final Chapters for a total of 159 episodes.)	April 5, 2009 – March 27, 2011; April 6, 2014 – June 28, 2015	May 24, 2010 – February 8, 2013; January 7, 2017 – June 23, 2018 (as The Final Chapters)
5	Doragon Bōru Sūpā (ドラゴンボール超(スーパー)) (Note: The title is sometimes incorrectly romanized as "Chou" rather than Super. It is romanized as "Sūpā", akin to how the kanji is utilized for "Sūpā Saiyajin" elsewhere in the franchise.)	Dragon Ball Super	131	July 5, 2015 – March 25, 2018	January 7, 2017 – October 5, 2019 (Funimation dub); January 21 – November 18, 2017 (Bang Zoom! dub)
6	Doragon Bōru Daima (ドラゴンボールDAIMA)	Dragon Ball Daima	20	October 11, 2024 – February 28, 2025	January 10 – May 16, 2025 (Crunchyroll release); June 15 – November 2, 2025 (Adult Swim broadcast)
7	Doragon Bōru Sūpā: Birusu (ドラゴンボール超(スーパー) ビルス)	Dragon Ball Super: Beerus	6	October 11, 2026 – present	
Total			832		

== Web series ==
In May 2018, V Jump announced a promotional anime for the game Super Dragon Ball Heroes that adapts the games story arcs.

No.	Title	English	Episodes	Japanese release
1	Sūpā Doragon Bōru Hirozu (スーパー ドラゴンボールヒーローズ)	Super Dragon Ball Heroes	56	July 1, 2018 – August 8, 2024

== Television specials ==
The Dragon Ball franchise has spawned three one-hour long television specials that aired on Fuji TV, the first two based on the "Z" portion of the series and the third based on the "GT" portion. Of these specials, the first and third are original stories created by the anime staff, while the second is based on a special chapter of the manga.

Though the specials aired on TV in Japan, Funimation's North American releases of the episodes are on home video, each one labeled "Feature" the same as their theatrical films. This, doubled with the inclusion of the "Z" specials in Funimation's remastered "Movie Double Features" has caused fans to continue to erroneously believe these to be theatrical films, when they are not.

On April 7, 2013, a two-part hour-long crossover TV special, between Dragon Ball Z, One Piece and Toriko, referred to as Dream 9 Toriko & One Piece & Dragon Ball Z Super Collaboration Special!! aired on Fuji TV. The first part is named "Run, Strongest Team! Toriko, Luffy, Goku!" (走れ最強軍団！トリコとルフィと悟空！, Hashire Saikyō Gundan! Toriko to Luffy to Goku!) and the second is titled "History's Strongest Collaboration vs. Glutton of the Sea" (史上最強コラボVS海の大食漢, Shijō Saikyō Collaboration vs. Umi no Taishokukan). The plot has the International Gourmet Organization (from Toriko) sponsoring the Tenka'ichi Shokuōkai, a race with no rules that characters from all three series compete in.

On October 8, 2017, a two-part TV special of Dragon Ball Super aired on Fuji TV. It counted as both episodes 109 and 110 of the series.

On December 2, 2018, as part of promoting new film Broly, a one-hour television special aired on Fuji TV in Japan entitled "Just Before the Dragon Ball Super Movie Debut! Looking Back on the TV Show's Climax ".

Japanese title English translation	English title	Japanese air date	North American release
Tatta Hitori no Saishū Kessen ~Furīza ni Idonda Zetto-senshi Son Gokū no Chichi~ (たったひとりの最終決戦〜フリーザに挑んだZ戦士 孫悟空の父〜); A Lonesome, Final Battle - The Father of Z Warrior Son Goku, who Challenged Freeza	Bardock – The Father of Goku	October 17, 1990	January 31, 2001
Kyokugen Batoru!! San Dai Sūpā Saiya-jin Supesharu (極限バトル!!三大超スーパーサイヤ人 スペシャル); Extreme Battle!! Three Great Super Saiyans Special	－	August 3, 1992	－
Zetsubō e no Hankō!! Nokosareta Chō-Senshi•Gohan to Torankusu (絶望への反抗!!残された超戦士・悟飯とトランクス); Defiance in the Face of Despair!! The Remaining Super-Warriors: Gohan and Trunks	The History of Trunks	February 24, 1993	October 24, 2000
Zenbu Misemasu Toshi Wasure Doragon Bōru Zetto! (全部見せます 年忘れドラゴンボールZ!); We'll Show You Everything: Forget the Year's Cares with Dragon Ball Z!	－	December 31, 1993	－
Gokū Gaiden! Yūki no Akashi wa Sūshinchū (悟空外伝! 勇気の証しは四星球); Goku Side Story! The Proof of His Courage is the Four-Star Ball	A Hero's Legacy	March 26, 1997	November 16, 2004
Dorīmu Nain Toriko Wan Pīsu Dragon Bōru Zetto Chō Korabo Supesharu!! (ドリーム9 トリコ×ONE PIECE×ドラゴンボールZ 超コラボスペシャル!!); Dream 9 Toriko & One Piece & Dragon Ball Z Super Collaboration Special!!	－	April 7, 2013	March 4, 2023
Korezo Zen Uchū Ichi no Kyūkyoku Batoru! Son Gokū bāsasu Jiren!! (これぞ全宇宙一の究極バトル！ 孫悟空VSジレン!!); This is the Ultimate Battle in All the Universes! Son Goku vs Jiren!!	－	October 8, 2017	May 4 & May 11, 2019 (as Dragon Ball Super episodes 109 & 110)
Doragon Bōru no Chokuzen Sūpā Eiga Debyū! Terebi Bangu no Kuraimakkusu o Furikaette!! (ドラゴンボールの直前スーパー映画デビュー！テレビ番組のクライマックスを振り返って！！); Just Before the Dragon Ball Super Movie Debut! Looking Back on the TV Show's Climax	－	December 2, 2018	－

== Festival films ==
Dragon Ball: Yo! Son Goku and His Friends Return!! is a 35-minute anime short film that was shown at the 2008 Jump Super Anime Tour, which visited ten Japanese cities to celebrate Weekly Shōnen Jump's 40th anniversary. It was later released as a triple feature DVD with One Piece: Romance Dawn Story and Tegami Bachi: Light and Blue Night Fantasy in 2009, that was available only through a mail-in offer exclusive to Japanese residents. In 2013, it was included in the limited edition home video release of Battle of Gods.

Another short film, Dragon Ball: Episode of Bardock, was shown at the Jump Festa 2012 event on December 17, 2011. It is an adaptation of the three part spin-off manga of the same name by Naho Ōishi that ran in V Jump from August to October 2011, which is a spin-off sequel to the Bardock – The Father of Goku TV special. It was later released on DVD in the February 3, 2012, issue of Saikyō Jump together with Dragon Ball: Plan to Eradicate the Super Saiyans. The film was included subtitled in the European and North American exclusive Xbox 360 video game Dragon Ball Z: For Kinect, released in October 2012.

Japanese title	English title	Japanese release	North American release
Ossu! Kaette Kita Son Gokū to Nakama-tachi!! (オッス! 帰ってきた孫悟空と仲間たち!!)	Yo! Son Goku and His Friends Return!!	September 21, 2008	－
Episōdo obu Bādakku (エピソードオブバーダック)	Episode of Bardock	December 17, 2011	October 9, 2012

== Original video animations ==
In 1993, Toei Animation, in cooperation with Weekly Shōnen Jump and V Jump, produced a two-part original video animation (OVA) that serves as a video strategy guide to the Family Computer game titled Dragon Ball Z Side Story: Plan to Eradicate the Saiyans. The first volume was released on VHS on July 23, while the second was released on August 25. The animation was also used in the 1994 two part video games, True Plan to Eradicate the Saiyans, released for the Playdia. The complete OVA was included in the second Dragon Ball Z Dragon Box DVD set released in Japan in 2003.

The OVA was remade for the 2010 PlayStation 3 and Xbox 360 video game Dragon Ball: Raging Blast 2 under the title Dragon Ball: Plan to Eradicate the Super Saiyans. It was included in Dragon Ball: Raging Blast 2 as a bonus feature, unlocked at the start of gameplay without any necessary cheat code or in-game achievement, presented in its original Japanese-language audio with subtitles appropriate for each region. It was later released on DVD in the February 3, 2012, issue of Saikyō Jump together with Dragon Ball: Episode of Bardock.

Japanese title	English title	Japanese release	North American release
Gaiden: Saiya-jin Zetsumetsu Keikaku (外伝 サイヤ人絶滅計画)	Side Story: Plan to Eradicate the Saiyans	August 6, 1993	－
Sūpā Saiya-jin Zetsumetsu Keikaku (超サイヤ人絶滅計画)	Plan to Eradicate the Super Saiyans	November 11, 2010	November 2, 2010

== Educational programs ==
Two educational shorts based on the original Dragon Ball anime were produced in 1988. The first was a traffic safety special titled Goku's Traffic Safety (悟空の交通安全, Gokū no Kōtsū Ansen), while the second was a fire safety special titled Goku's Fire Brigade (悟空の消防隊, Gokū no Shōbōtai). The two educational films were included in the Dragon Box DVD set released in Japan in 2004. Both are written by Keiji Terui.

No.	Title	Directed by	Animation directed by	Art directed by	Original release date
1	Goku's Traffic Safety; Transliteration: "Gokū no Kōtsū Ansen" (Japanese: 悟空の交通安全)	Mitsuo Hashimoto	Masayuki Uchiyama	Toshiaki Marumori	June 8, 1988
2	Goku's Fire Brigade; Transliteration: "Gokū no Shōbōtai" (Japanese: 悟空の消防隊)	Kazuhisa Takenouchi	Yukio Ebisawa	Takeshi Waki	June 8, 1988

== Commercial reception ==
Dragon Ball is one of the most successful franchises in animation history. The anime series is broadcast in more than 80 countries worldwide. DVD home video releases of the Dragon Ball anime series have topped Japan's sales charts on several occasions. In the United States, the Dragon Ball Z anime series sold over 25 million DVD units by January 2012. As of 2017, the Dragon Ball anime franchise has sold more than 30 million DVD and Blu-ray units in the United States.
