= Dragon Ball: Raging Blast 2 =

2010 video game

- Official PEGI Cover Art
- Developer: Spike
- Publisher: Namco Bandai Games (Note: Released under the Bandai brand name.)
- Director: Hiroyuki Kaneko
- Producer: Ryo Mito
- Designers: Satoshi Tsurumi; Nobuyoshi Kanzaki
- Programmers: Shiro Aoki; Shigeru Saito
- Composer: Kenji Yamamoto (Note: Yamamoto's score was replaced with the original Dragon Ball Z score by Shunsuke Kikuchi in later copies of the game after it was discovered that many of his songs were plagiarized.)
- Series: Dragon Ball
- Platforms: PlayStation 3, Xbox 360
- Release: NA: November 2, 2010; EU: November 5, 2010; JP: November 11, 2010
- Genre: Fighting
- Modes: Single-player, multiplayer

Dragon Ball: Raging Blast 2 (Japanese: ドラゴンボール レイジングブラスト2, Hepburn: Doragon Bōru Reijingu Burasuto Tsū) is a video game based on the manga and anime franchise Dragon Ball and is a follow-up to the 2009 video game Dragon Ball: Raging Blast. It was developed by Spike and published by Namco Bandai under the Bandai label for the PlayStation 3 and Xbox 360 gaming consoles in the beginning of November 2010.

The game is a 3-D fighter that allows players to play as characters within the Dragon Ball universe, either against the game's AI or another player in one of the various modes of play both on and offline. The game comes with a new remake of the 1993 OVA Dragon Ball Z Side Story: Plan to Eradicate the Saiyans, now retitled Dragon Ball: Plan to Eradicate the Super Saiyans.

While becoming the second-best-selling game in Japan for November of its release year, the game would meet with criticism over its gameplay, controls, repetitive AI, and lack of proper story mode.

== Gameplay ==
A screenshot of the gameplay, showing a fight between Hatchiyack and Super Saiyan Goku on a deserted planet (with Frieza's spaceship visible in the background). The border around the each character's profile portrait are the health (green) and ki (yellow) meters.

Like its predecessor, Raging Blast 2 uses 3-D gaming mechanics with the camera alternating from over the shoulder to overhead angles at various moments. The player takes on the role of one of the available characters taking on another character from the franchise using various basic, melée, or signature ki fighting techniques. The combat features a technique called Raging Soul, where players are restricted from ki attacks, but physical attacks become stronger.

Replacing the standard story mode from previous Dragon Ball fighting games is the Galaxy Mode. Here each character is represented by a planet in the game's galaxy. Within these planets are several mission paths. Each mission has various advantages or handicaps that will affect the overall fight. Completing some of these missions will unlock powerups and or other mission paths. Other modes of play are the Battle Zone, where player take on fighters from different zones, on and offline battle modes where players can take on friends or other random players from around the world, and the World Tournament, which players can take part in either Tenkaichi Budokai or Cell games-style fighting competition.

== Development ==
The game was first announced in the May 3 issue of Weekly Shōnen Jump. The announcement revealed that the game would include up to 90 playable characters in total and improved visuals. Images within the announcement featured several screenshots and production that featured polished character models of Goku, Vegeta, and Frieza fighting on Earth and Namek, respectively. It was also revealed that the game would be released for the PlayStation 3 and Xbox 360 consoles later that year. On May 11, Namco Bandai America announced that Raging Blast 2 along with Tenkaichi Tag Team would be released throughout North America sometime in the fall. The June 14 issue of Weekly Shōnen Jump revealed that Dabura and the movie villains Turles and Janemba would be playable characters. In the July issue of V Jump it was revealed that Future Gohan, Pikkon, and Nail would be playable characters. There also featured a screenshot of Future Gohan in Super Saiyan form fighting #17. Giving the possibility that the storyline from The History of Trunks and Trunks: The Story might be in the game's story mode in some form.

On July 22, more gameplay screenshots were made public. Weekly Shōnen Jump also revealed that the Super Saiyan 3 forms of Vegeta and Broly would be returning. The following issue of Shōnen Jump also confirmed their return. The August 9 issue of Shōnen Jump revealed that the game would include six characters that have never been featured within a Dragon Ball game, and that the game would include a remake to the 1993 OVA Saiyan Zetsumetsu Keikaku (サイヤ人絶滅計画, Saiyajin Zetsumetsu Keikaku; Plan to Eliminate the Saiyans) which would be retitled as Super Saiyan Zetsumetsu Keikaku (超サイヤ人絶滅計画, Sūpā Saiyajin Zetsumetsu Keikaku; Plan to Eliminate the Super Saiyans). A feature that was originally a visual strategy guide for the Famicom game by the same name and was in turn, made into two video games for the Playdia. Included were design sheets for both Goku and primary villain Dr. Raichi stating that the remake would use current up to date animation methods and would feature about thirty minutes' worth of new footage. It also revealed the Japanese release date for November 11. Shortly after, Namco Bandai's Japanese branch issued a press release confirming the feature's inclusion into the game. The following day Namco Bandai's North American branch announced that the feature would be included in that region's release of the game as Dragon Ball: Plan to Eradicate the Super Saiyans.

At the same time the European branch announced the inclusion of the featurette in their release of the game. The following issue of Shōnen Jump, a few days later, revealed that the villain Hatchiyack would be a playable character within the game. In September it was reported that Europe would also get a collector's edition of the game that would include a pop-up cover sleeve, a laser animation cel of Goku from Plan to Eliminate the Super Saiyans, and a set of scratch off card with codes to unlock bonus costumes that would, in turn, add new abilities to specific characters. In the following September 20 issue of Shōnen Jump it was revealed that the Japanese release of the game would come packaged with a color booklet filled with the character design sheets from the Plan to Eradicate the Super Saiyans feature. It was also revealed that the game would feature another CG opening introduction with another new theme song by J-pop vocalist Hironobu Kageyama titled "Battle of Omega". On October 6, Namco Bandai released an announcement that the game was near completion for both consoles. The following week, a demo of the game was made available on the Xbox Live Marketplace, and was made available on PlayStation Network two weeks after. The November issue of V Jump revealed that Tarble, the character from the feature Yo! Son Goku and His Friends Return!!, would make video game debut as a playable character within the game. Marking the character's first time being marketed outside Japan. Shortly after Namco Bandai would also announce that the game would be released throughout North America on November 2, with the company announcing that the game was in stores after the initial release date.

== Characters ==
=== Returning Characters ===
Name	Playable Transformations	Available at Start
Android #16		Yes
Android #17		Yes
Android #18		Yes
Android #19		Yes
Android #20		Yes
Bardock		No
Broly	Base; Super Saiyan; Legendary Super Saiyan	Yes
Broly	Super Saiyan 3	No
Burter		Yes
Captain Ginyu		Yes
Cell	Imperfect Form; Semi-perfect Form; Perfect Form; Super Perfect Form	Yes
Chiaotzu		Yes
Dodoria		Yes
Frieza	First form; Second form; Third form; Final form; 100% final form	Yes
Gogeta	Super Saiyan	No
Gohan	Base; Super Saiyan; Super Saiyan 2	No
Goku	Base; Super Saiyan; Super Saiyan 2; Super Saiyan 3	Yes
Goten	Base; Super Saiyan	Yes
Gotenks	Base; Super Saiyan; Super Saiyan 3	Yes
Guldo		Yes
Jeice		Yes
Kid Buu		No
Kid Gohan		Yes
Kid Trunks	Base; Super Saiyan	Yes
Krillin		Yes
Innocent Buu		Yes
Majin Vegeta	Super Saiyan 2	No
Nappa		Yes
Piccolo		Yes
Raditz		Yes
Recoome		Yes
Super Buu	Base; Gotenks absorbed; Gohan absorbed	Yes
Teen Gohan	Base; Super Saiyan; Super Saiyan 2	No
Tien		Yes
Trunks (Sword)	Base; Super Saiyan	No
Trunks	Base; Super Saiyan; Super Trunks	Yes
Vegeta	Base; Super Saiyan; Super Vegeta; Super Saiyan 2	Yes
Vegeta	Super Saiyan 3	No
Vegeta (Scouter)		No
Vegito	Base; Super Saiyan	Yes
Videl		Yes
Yamcha		Yes
Zarbon	Base; Monster	Yes

=== New characters ===
Name	Playable Transformations	Available at Start
Android #13	Base; Super Android 13	No
Android #14		No
Android #15		No
Bojack	Base; Transformed	No
Cell Jr.		Yes
Cooler	Base; Final Form	No
Cui		Yes
Dabura		No
Dore		No
Future Gohan	Base; Super Saiyan	No
Hatchiyack		No
Janemba	Transformed	No
Mecha-Frieza		No
Meta-Cooler		No
Nail		Yes
Neiz		No
Pikkon		No
Saibaman		Yes
Salza		No
Tarble		No
Turles		No
Ultimate Gohan		No
Zangya		Yes

== Reception ==
Reception

Aggregate scores
Aggregator	Score
GameRankings	(PS3): 60.85% (X360): 58.59%
Metacritic	(PS3): 60/100 (X360): 57/100

Review scores
Publication	Score
Famitsu	31/40
GameRevolution	(PS3): 3/5
GameSpot	5/10
GamesRadar+	2.5/5
IGN	5.5/10
3DJuegos	(PS3): 6/10
Vandal	6/10

Dragon Ball: Raging Blast 2 was released in North America on Nov 2, 2010, in Japan on Nov 11, 2010, in Europe on Nov 5, 2010, and in Australia on Nov 4, 2010. The PS3 version would go on to be the best-selling game for November in Japan, beating out Super Mario Collection Special Pack and Pokémon Black and White.

Dragon Ball: Raging Blast 2 received mixed reviews with critics complimenting the game as an improvement over its predecessor. Both the PS3 and Xbox 360 versions earned their own aggregated scores of 60/100 and 57/100 on Metacritic, with 60.85% and 58.59% on GameRankings. Anthony Gallegos of IGN said players will find the mechanics "complex, although when you play as varying characters, the mechanics are more or less the same". He praised the graphics of the game as it "looks just like the anime but the background and environments need improvements." Henry Gilbert of Xbox Magazine felt that "players only interested in single player would still a lot to work with, Raging Blast 2 does not feel like a unique game." Brian Rowe of GameZone felt that "the versus modes were the game's real selling points, and that the Power Battle was it highlight, as players could be overpowered with certain characters in battle. In the end his ultimate opinion on the licence was that it was a good game but without a story mode to go with it, his final verdict was an average score." Carolyn Petit of GameSpot stated that "the game was merely an expansion of the Raging Blast, although she also pointed out that the Raging Soul system made building ki worthwhile." Nathan Grayson of GamesRadar+ felt that "the game was moving the license a large step in the right direction but criticized the game for not having a proper story mode, a clunky camera, and repetitive gameplay."
