= Dragon Ball Z Side Story: Plan to Eradicate the Saiyans =

Japanese video game

- Cover of the OVA's second VHS

ドラゴンボールZ外伝 サイヤ人絶滅計画 (Dragon Ball Z Gaiden: Saiyajin Zetsumetsu Keikaku)
- Genre: Action, fantasy
- Video game
- Developer: Tose
- Publisher: Bandai
- Platform: Family Computer
- Released: August 6, 1993
- Original video animation
- Directed by: Shigeyasu Yamauchi
- Produced by: Kozo Morishita
- Written by: Takao Koyama
- Music by: Keiju Ishikawa
- Studio: Bird Studio, Toei Animation
- Released: July 23, 1993 - August 25, 1993
- Runtime: 26 minutes (each)
- Episodes: 2
- Video game

Dragon Ball Z: True Plan to Eradicate the Saiyans - Earth Saga
- Developer: Bandai
- Publisher: Bandai
- Platform: Playdia
- Released: September 23, 1994
- Video game

Dragon Ball Z: True Plan to Eradicate the Saiyans - Space Saga
- Developer: Bandai
- Publisher: Bandai
- Platform: Playdia
- Released: December 16, 1994
- Original video animation

Dragon Ball: Plan to Eradicate the Super Saiyans
- Directed by: Yoshihiro Ueda
- Produced by: Tomoaki Imanishi; Hiroyuki Kinoshita
- Written by: Hitoshi Tanaka
- Music by: Hiroshi Takaki
- Studio: Bird Studio, Toei Animation
- Released: November 11, 2010
- Runtime: 30 minutes

Dragon Ball Z Side Story: Plan to Eradicate the Saiyans (Note: Dragon Ball Z Side Story: Plan to Eradicate the Saiyans (Japanese: ドラゴンボールZ外伝 サイヤ人絶滅計画, Hepburn: Dragon Ball Z Gaiden: Saiyajin Zetsumetsu Keikaku)) is a 1993 card battle role-playing game developed by Tose and published by Bandai for the Family Computer game console. Based on the Dragon Ball franchise, the player's movement and battle choices are dictated by randomly generated playing cards.

The game sold 300,000 copies, and was adapted into a 1993 original video animation (OVA) series that was released in two parts as strategy guides. Footage from the OVA was reused in a 1994 Playdia video game, and the OVA was completely remade in 2010.

== Gameplay ==
Dragon Ball Z Side Story: Plan to Eradicate the Saiyans is a card battle role-playing game, where the player's movement and battle choices are dictated by the randomly generated playing cards. The multiplayer mode is a six player tournament using difficulty levels of computer players that are in the save file. Players can choose between Goku, Gohan, Piccolo, Trunks and Vegeta. Winner records are kept in the game data, as well as any moves the player might learn.

== Plot ==
Dr. Raichi is the lone survivor of the Tuffles, a race that once lived on Planet Plant before the invasion of the Saiyans. The Saiyans not only massacred the entire Tuffle race, but also stole their technology and conquered the planet; renaming it Planet Vegeta in honor of their king. Raichi managed to escape and found refuge on the Dark Planet and prepared to eradicate the last remaining Saiyans.

On Earth, he sends devices that emit a substance called Destron Gas that can destroy all life. When Mr. Popo finds out that only a few hours remain until the planet's destruction, Goku, Gohan, Vegeta, Trunks, and Piccolo rush to destroy the devices located around the planet. They manage to destroy all but one that is protected by an impenetrable energy barrier. However, Frieza, Cooler, Turles and Lord Slug appear and engage the heroes. It is revealed by King Kai that the villains are ghost warriors and will continually come back to life when killed unless defeated in the same way their lives were originally ended.

The heroes track Dr. Raichi down to the Dark Planet and engage him, discovering that his ghost warriors are generated by a machine called Hatchihyack, a device powered by the hate of the Tuffles. It is also revealed that Dr. Raichi is a ghost warrior himself, generated by Hatchihyack. When Vegeta vaporizes Raichi, preventing him from re-materializing, the hate Dr. Raichi had causes Hatchihyack to exceed its limit. Hatchihyack appears in a powerful android body. Hatchiyack devastates the heroes until the Saiyans, after having transformed into their Super Saiyan forms, combine their powers together into one massive wave of energy, ending the threat.

== Music ==
Dragon Ball Z Gaiden: Saiyan Zetsumetsu Keikaku Game Music

Soundtrack album by Keiju Ishikawa
- Released: October 21, 1993
- Genre: Anime/video game
- Length: 45:04
- Language: Japanese
- Label: Forte Music Entertainment

Dragon Ball Z Gaiden: Saiyan Zetsumetsu Keikaku Game Music (ドラゴンボールZ外伝 サイヤ人絶滅計画ゲームミュージック, Doragon Boru Zetto Gaiden: Saiyan Zetsumetsu Keikaku Gēmu Myūjikku; Dragon Ball Z Side Story: Plan To Eliminate the Saiyans Game Music) is the official licensed soundtrack of the video game for the Famicom system and later the Playdia's Shin Saiyan Zetsumetsu Keikaku Parts 1 and 2. It was released by Forte Music Entertainment on October 21, 1993.

It features music that was composed and arranged by Keiju Ishikawa. For the most part, the arrangement is composed of synthesizer keyboard-based work with added drum loops; however, there are a few tracks that contain guitar work. One feature on this album is that the tracks are listed in English instead of Japanese.

Track listing:

1. Main Theme of "Gaiden"
2. Search For Destron Gas
3. The Earth Field
4. Pacify A Storm
5. A Skirmish
6. Four Emperors
7. Grand Battle
8. Polluted Town
9. Planet Darkness
10. A One-Eyed Old Doctor
11. Ephemeral Requiem

== Reception ==
Dragon Ball Z Side Story: Plan to Eradicate the Saiyans sold 300,000 units in Japan. Japanese gaming magazine Famitsu gave the game a score of 22 out of 40.

== Original video animation ==
The video game was adapted into an original video animation (OVA) series of the same name directed by Shigeyasu Yamauchi and released on VHS in two parts as strategy guides. The first volume was released on July 23, 1993, and the second was released on August 25, 1993. A soundtrack featuring music from the animation was released on CD on October 21, 1993. The OVA was later included in the second volume of the Dragon Ball Z Dragon Box DVD box set, which was released in 2003.

=== Cast ===
- Masako Nozawa as Goku, Gohan and Turles
- Ryō Horikawa as Vegeta
- Toshio Furukawa as Piccolo
- Takeshi Kusao as Trunks
- Hiromi Tsuru as Bulma
- Naoko Watanabe as Chi-Chi
- Toku Nishio as Mr. Popo
- Tomiko Suzuki as Dende
- Ryūsei Nakao as Frieza and Cooler
- Hisao Egawa as Monster / Goddo Gadon
- Yusaku Yara as Slug
- Shinji Ogawa as Dr. Raichi
- Jōji Yanami as Kaio-sama / Narration
- Hideo Ishikawa as Hatchihyack

== Dragon Ball Z: True Plan to Eradicate the Saiyans ==
In 1994, footage from the OVA was reused in a separate Bandai video game for the Playdia console, Dragon Ball Z: True Plan to Eradicate the Saiyans (ドラゴンボールZ 真サイヤ人絶滅計画). The game was released in two parts, an Earth Arc on September 23, 1994, and a Space Arc on December 16, 1994, and had some previously unseen scenes.

== Dragon Ball: Plan to Eradicate the Super Saiyans ==
Screenshots of the original 1993 OVA (top) and the 2010 remake (bottom). In addition to new animation, the plot was also altered, as seen with Goku no longer being transformed in this scene.

Dragon Ball: Plan to Eradicate the Super Saiyans (Note: Dragon Ball: Plan to Eradicate the Super Saiyans (Japanese: ドラゴンボール 超(スーパー)サイヤ人絶滅計画, Hepburn: Doragon Bōru: Sūpā Saiya-jin Zetsumetsu Keikaku)) is a 2010 OVA and remake of 1993's Dragon Ball Z Side Story: Plan to Eradicate the Saiyans. The OVA was included in the Namco Bandai Games video game Dragon Ball: Raging Blast 2, which was released on November 2, 2010. It later received a coupled DVD release with Dragon Ball: Episode of Bardock in the March issue of the monthly magazine Saikyō Jump, which was released on February 3, 2012.

Most of the voice cast from the original 1993 OVA returned for the remake, with the exception of Shinji Ogawa, who was replaced by Hiroshi Iwasaki as the voice of Dr. Lychee. The 2010 remake also does not feature the characters Mr. Popo, the Monsters, or Goddo Gadon.
