= Ryō Horikawa =

Japanese actor and voice actor (born 1958)

- 堀川 りょう
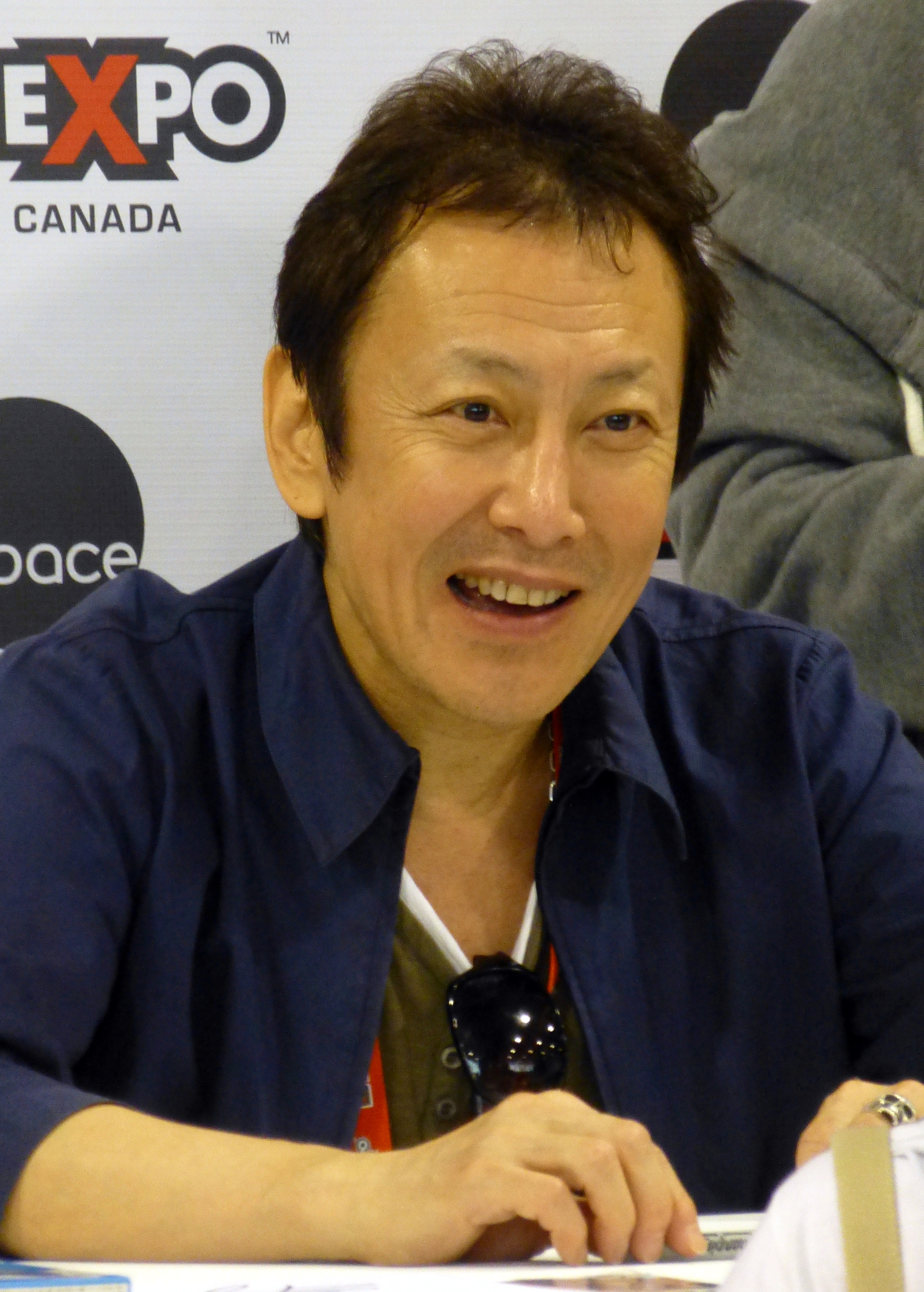
- Horikawa at the 2014 Fan Expo Canada
- Born: Makoto Horikawa (堀川 亮); February 1, 1958 (age 68); Osaka, Japan
- Occupations: Actor; voice actor
- Years active: 1984–present
- Agent: Aslead Company
- Notable work: Dragon Ball series as Vegeta; Saint Seiya as Andromeda Shun; Detective Conan as Heiji Hattori; Super Smash Bros. series as Captain Falcon
- Spouse: Hitomi Oikawa (m. 1988)
- Website: ryo-horikawa.com

Ryō Horikawa (堀川 りょう, Horikawa Ryō) born Makoto Horikawa (堀川 亮, Horikawa Makoto; born February 1, 1958) is a Japanese actor and voice actor from Osaka. He has been married to Japanese voice actress Hitomi Oikawa since 1988. His former stage name was also Ryō Horikawa (堀川 亮, Horikawa Ryō), which uses the kanji of his given name, though pronounced "Ryō".

He is best known for his roles as Vegeta from the Dragon Ball series, Reinhard von Lohengramm from Legend of the Galactic Heroes, Andromeda Shun from Saint Seiya, Heiji Hattori from Detective Conan, and Captain Falcon in the Super Smash Bros. series.

== Career ==
Horikawa started out as a child actor in elementary school. He made his debut in voice acting as Kenta Hirono, the protagonist of the 1984 anime Dream Soldier Wing-Man. From there, he became famous for character voice roles in anime such as Andromeda Shun in Saint Seiya, Reinhard von Lohengramm in Legend of the Galactic Heroes, Vegeta in the Dragon Ball series, and Heiji Hattori in Great Detective Conan. He is also well known for his game role as Captain Falcon in the Super Smash Bros. video game series, with his most well-known and famous line being "Falcon Punch!". His wife is also a voice artist. Horikawa is also a fluent English speaker.

== Filmography ==
=== Television animation ===
1980s

- Dr. Slump and Arale-chan (1984) – Charmy Yamada, Sakamoto
- Dream Soldier Wing-Man (1984) – Kenta Hirono
- Fist of the North Star (1984) – Young Kenshiro
- GeGeGe no Kitarō (1985) – Jigoku Douji
- Dragon Ball (1986) – Charmy Yamada
- Saint Seiya (1986) – Andromeda Shun
- Esper Mami (1987) – Boy
- Lady Lady!! (1987) – Arthur Drake Brighton
- Kiteretsu Daihyakka (1988) – Boy, Wolf, Dog, Boy A, Taro, Richard
- Dragon Ball Z (1989) – Vegeta, Vegetto
- Dragon Quest (1989) – Adonis

1990s

- Magical Taluluto (1990) – Tsutomu Harako
- YuYu Hakusho (1993) – Karasu
- Legend of the Swordmaster Yaiba (1993) – Takeshi Onimaru
- Ghost Sweeper Mikami (1993) – Tadao Yokoshima
- Pretty Soldier Sailor Moon S (1994) – Thomas Harris
- Kiteretsu Daihyakka (1994) – Mogubee
- Pretty Soldier Sailor Moon SuperS (1995) – Yoshiki Usui
- Nurse Angel Ririka SOS(1995) – Buros
- Phantom Thief Saint Tail (1995) – Misato
- Dragon Ball GT (1996) – Vegeta, Gogeta
- Great Detective Conan (1996) – Namigawa Katsuhiko, Heiji Hattori
- The Files of Young Kindaichi (1997) – Asa Kakimoto, Ohno, Tsukishima
- Trigun (1998) – E.G. Mine
- Yu-Gi-Oh! (1998) – Ryuichi Fuwa
- Pocket Monsters (1999) – Ziggy

2000s

- Digimon Tamers (2001) – Makuramon
- The Twelve Kingdoms (2002) – Shisei
- Ashita no Nadja (2004) – Antonio Fabiani
- Konjiki no Gash Bell!! (2005) – Zaruchimu
- Kenichi: The Mightiest Disciple (2006) – Hermit
- Ojarumaru (2008) – Gorgeous
- Dragon Ball Kai (2009) – Vegeta, Vegetto

2010s

- Digimon Fusion (2012) – Phelesmon
- Samurai Flamenco (2014) – Heatnoid
- Dragon Ball Super (2015) – Vegeta, Vegetto
- Gintama: Porori Hen (2017) – Kusanagi
- Actors: Songs Connection (2019) – Kagetora Nagano

2020s

- Hairpin Double (2022) – Ken Horibe
- Dragon Ball Daima (2024) – Vegeta
- Dragon Ball Super: Beerus (2026) – Vegeta

=== Original video animation (OVA) ===
- Legend of the Galactic Heroes (1988) – Reinhard von Lohengramm
- Vampire Princess Miyu (1988) – Kei Yuzuki
- Shin Captain Tsubasa (1989) – Jito Hiroshi
- Yagami-kun no Katei no Jijō (1990) – Futamura
- Slow Step (1991) – Naoto Kadomatsu
- Mobile Suit Gundam 0083: Stardust Memory (1991) – Kou Uraki
- Dragon Ball Z Side Story: Plan to Eradicate the Saiyans (1993) – Vegeta
- Please Save My Earth (1993) – Hokuto Yakushimaru
- Iczer Girl Iczelion (1994) – Chaos
- Kizuna (1994) – Kai Sagano
- Kizuna 2 (1994) – Kai Sagano
- Kizuna: Bonds of Love (1994) – Kai Sagano
- Ultraman: Super Fighter Legend (1996) – Ultraman Taro
- Detective Conan (2000) – Heiji Hattori
- Kizuna: Bonds of Love (2001) – Kai Sagano
- Dragon Ball: Yo! Son Goku and His Friends Return!! (2008) – Vegeta

=== Theatrical animation ===
- Toki no Tabibito -Time Stranger- (1986) – Mori Ranmaru
- Doraemon: Nobita and the Knights on Dinosaurs (1987) – Nanja Group Member
- Maison Ikkoku Kanketsu-Hen (1988) – Nozomu Nikaido
- The Five Star Stories (1989) – Amaterasu/Ladios Sopp
- Dragon Ball Z: The Return of Cooler (1992) – Vegeta
- Dragon Ball Z: Super Android 13! (1992) – Vegeta
- Dragon Ball Z: Broly - The Legendary Super Saiyan (1993) – Vegeta
- Dragon Ball Z: Bojack Unbound (1993) – Vegeta
- Dragon Ball Z: Fusion Reborn (1995) – Vegeta, Gogeta
- Dragon Ball Z: Wrath of the Dragon (1995) – Vegeta
- Dragon Ball Z: Battle of Gods (2013) – Vegeta
- Dragon Ball Z: Resurrection 'F' (2015) – Vegeta
- Dragon Ball Super: Broly (2018) – Vegeta, Gogeta
- Dragon Ball Super: Super Hero (2022) – Vegeta
- Mononoke the Movie: The Ashes of Rage (2025) – Fujimaki

=== Video games ===
- Abalaburn – Lemuria
- Another Century's Episode 2 – Kou Uraki
- Astal – Geist
- Detective Conan: Tsuioku no Mirajiyu – Heiji Hattori
- Double Dragon II: The Revenge PC Engine version – Billy Lee
- Dragon Ball Z series – Vegeta, Vegetto, Gogeta
- Final Fantasy series
  - Final Fantasy IV – Edward, Zeromus
  - Dissidia Final Fantasy Opera Omnia – Edward
  - World of Final Fantasy – Thane of Saronia
- Kunio-kun series
  - Kunio no Oden – Kunio, Godai, Sonokawa
  - Super Dodge Ball – Kunio
- Langrisser I & Langrisser II – Ledin
- Lost Odyssey – Tolten
- Makeruna! Makendō 2 – Doro‑san
- Phantasy Star Online 2 – Kyokuya
- Power Stone – Falcon
- Power Stone 2 – Falcon
- Shining Force EXA – Ragnadaam III
- Star Ocean: The Second Story – Dias Flac, Bowman Jean
- Star Ocean: The Second Story R – Dias Flac, Bowman Jean
- Super Robot Wars series – Kou Uraki
- Super Smash Bros. series
  - Super Smash Bros. – Captain Falcon
  - Super Smash Bros. Melee – Captain Falcon
  - Super Smash Bros. Brawl – Captain Falcon
  - Super Smash Bros. for Nintendo 3DS and Wii U – Captain Falcon, Dunban
  - Super Smash Bros. Ultimate – Captain Falcon, Dunban
- Tales of Destiny – Miktran
- Tales of the Rays – Miktran
- Weekly Shōnen Jump series
  - J-Stars Victory VS – Vegeta
  - Jump Force – Vegeta
- Xenoblade Chronicles – Dunban

=== Tokusatsu ===
- B-Fighter Kabuto – Heat Fruit Beast Pineappler (Ep. 19)
- Tetsuwan Tantei Robotack – Speedam/Speedy Wonder
- Samurai Sentai Shinkenger – Akumaro Sujigarano (Eps. 28 - 43)
- Unofficial Sentai Akibaranger Season Two – General Two/Tsuguo Ushirozawa
- Kamen Rider Revice – Himself (Ep. 31), Juuga Driver

=== Drama CDs ===
- Abunai series 3: Abunai Bara to Yuri no Sono
- Abunai series 4: Abunai Campus Love – Ayumu Izaki
- Catch Me! – Tatsuki Kanou
- Ginnoyuki Furufuru – Yukihiko Takagi
- Que Sera, Sera – Fujito Mura
- Shiawase ni Naroune – Tokio Mouri
- Sweet Summer Supplies – Tokio Mouri

=== Dubbing ===
- Thomas and Friends – Henry the Green Engine (Seasons 1-8), Mavis the Quarry Diesel (Season 5 only) and Oliver the Big Excavator, (Season 6 only)
- Thomas and the Magic Railroad – Henry the Green Engine
- Dir En Grey's Arche – Trailer
- The New Adventures of Batman – Dick Grayson/Robin
- The Lord of the Rings – Pippin Took
- Mr. Men – Mr. Mean)
- Underdogs – Grosso
- Snow White's Adventures – Doppy
- Gameoverse – Warrick

=== Voice/Recording Director ===
- Exit
- Xenoblade Chronicles
