= Neko Majin =

Manga series by Akira Toriyama

- Kanzenban volume cover

ネコマジン
- Genre: Adventure; Fantasy comedy
- Manga
- Written by: Akira Toriyama
- Published by: Shueisha
- English publisher: NA: Viz Media (one chapter only)
- Imprint: Jump Comics
- Magazine: Weekly Shōnen Jump; Monthly Shōnen Jump
- English magazine: NA: Shonen Jump (one chapter only)
- Original run: May 1999 – January 2005
- Volumes: 1
- icon

Neko Majin (ネコマジン) is a Japanese one-shot manga series written and illustrated by Akira Toriyama. Spanning eight total installments published irregularly between 1999 and 2005 in Shueisha's shōnen manga magazines Weekly Shōnen Jump and Monthly Shōnen Jump, they were collected into a single kanzenban volume in April 2005. Its later portion is named Neko Majin Z (ネコマジン Z), and is a self-parody of Toriyama's Dragon Ball.

== Plot ==
The series revolves around the adventures of the Neko Majin, a race of cat-creatures who enjoy practical jokes and martial arts. At least two use Dragon Ball-style attacks such as the "Nekohameha", while one in particular, named "Z", wears an outfit like Dragon Ball's Son Goku, and carries a nyoi-bo. As the series transitions to Neko Majin Z, it becomes increasingly intertwined with the Dragon Ball world as regular characters join the cast, including an overweight Saiyan named Onio, and Freeza's son Kuriza. There are also guest appearances by Vegeta, Majin Boo, Son Goku and his family members.

== Characters ==
Neko Majin (ネコマジン; lit. 'magical cat" or "cat genie')
A race of magical cat-creatures, who span a variety of breeds and body-shapes, although most appear to have distinctive long ears in the manner of the author's Cornish Rex. This series concerns three: a mixed-breed^{[Neko Majin ga iru 2]} referred to only as "Neko Majin Mix"; "Neko Majin Mike" (ネコマジンみけ), a male calico (三毛猫, mikeneko); and "Neko Majin Z" (ネコマジンZ), a disciple of Son Goku from Dragon Ball. Mix and Z are both blue, while Mike sports calico fur; all three are of a similar, round body shape, and are drawn with angled slits for eyes. These Neko Majin possess abilities similar to Dragon Ball characters, such as flight and the "Nekohameha",^{[ch 1]}, similar to the Kamehameha. They are also capable of using some magic, such as the transformation abilities demonstrated by Neko Majin Mike. The source of these abilities appears to be a ball called a Majin Orb (majin-dama), without which they lose all powers.^{[ch Z4]} A common trait seems to be conning visitors with various services.^{[ch 1]} Mix charges 100 yen in exchange for any favor, and Z in particular dresses as a koala and charges eight dollars to take pictures with them. He has a Super Saiyan-like transformation called Super Neko Majin.^{[ch Z1]}
Kojiro (コジロー, Kojirō)
A boy that Neko Majin Mike met about 30 years ago. He was a scrawny kid, but has since grown up to become a chubby teacher at a small local school.^{[ch Mike]}
Onio (オニオ)
A Saiyan with the overall body-shape and facial structure as Suppaman, Parzan, and Bubibinman from Toriyama's manga Dr. Slump. He first appears on Earth on honeymoon and desires to conquer the Earth and wipe out its inhabitants in order to make it a vacation home. He and his wife take a photo with the "koala" Z, but when the Neko Majin fondles his wife's breasts, he becomes enraged and transforms into a Super Saiyan. However, he is quickly defeated.^{[ch Z1]} He returns with Kuriza for further encounters with Z.^{[ch Z2]}^{[ch Z3]}
Thunderbolt (サンダーボルト, Sandāboruto)
A nationally renowned fighter who is challenged by Neko Majin Z. He, too, has a girlfriend that he calls "Honey". In his fight with Z, he realizes that he is no match, and tries to get out of the battle except that Honey eggs Z on.^{[ch Z2]}
Kuriza (クリーザ, Kurīza)
The son of Dragon Ball villain, Freeza; he resembles his father except that his head is in the shape of a chestnut. He is called by Onio to destroy Z, but runs out of pages for the fight.^{[ch Z2]} He later plays soccer with the gang.^{[ch Z3]} He frequently mentions that Neko Majin is wasting pages with meaningless comments and battle scenes.^{[ch Z2]}
Vegeta
Vegeta is called to Earth by Kuriza and Onio, who need help to defeat Z. Vegeta discovers that the Neko Majin is surprisingly strong, but receives an "urgent call" that requires him to leave to another planet, despite Kuriza mentioning that his cell phone should not have signal. He vows that he will never appear in another gag manga.^{[ch Z3]}
Majin Boo
Majin Boo makes a short appearance to help when Neko Majin Z is rendered helpless by Usa Majin (the lesser-known rabbit version of Neko Majin). Every time Z was not in the scene, Boo would appear, making people think he was the Neko Majin.^{[ch Z4]}
Son Goku
Son Goku makes an appearance in the last chapter of Neko Majin Z where he spars with Z. He then tells the Neko Majin there is a new evil that he needs help to defeat at his family home. When they get there, Z learns that it is just a mouse in the pantry.^{[ch Z5]}

== Production ==
Akira Toriyama originally drew Neko Majin as a single one-shot, enjoying the relaxed and silly feel it has. He suggested that the reason it became a Dragon Ball parody was probably because he ran out of material and moved away from its original premise.

== Publication ==
Neko Majin is a series of eight one-shots written and illustrated by Akira Toriyama that were published irregularly in Shueisha's shōnen manga magazines Weekly Shōnen Jump and Monthly Shōnen Jump from 1999 to 2005. Although there were some similarities, it did not become a self-parody of Dragon Ball until Neko Majin Z, released in the June 2001 issue of Monthly Shōnen Jump. The chapters were compiled by Shueisha into a single kanzenban volume, released on April 4, 2005. On April 4, 2013, the chapters were fully colored and the kanzenban was released digitally.

In the October 2007 issue of the North American version of Shonen Jump, Viz Media included a translation of Neko Majin Z 5, simply released as Neko Majin Z.

=== Chapter list ===
| No. | Title | Date | Magazine issue |
|---|---|---|---|
| 1 | "Neko Majin is Here"; Neko Majin ga Iru (ネコマジンがいる) | May 1999 | Weekly Shōnen Jump 1999 #22–23 |
Neko Majin helps two "bad guys" when their motorcycle runs out of gas.
| 2 | "Neko Majin is Here 2"; Neko Majin ga Iru 2 (ネコマジンがいる2) | August 1999 | Weekly Shōnen Jump 1999 #37–38 |
Neko Majin finds a spaceship and accidentally crashes it. The space aliens, who were going to abduct a girl, complain, so he calls a mechanic. He also gets into a scuffle with ally of justice Pete Kobayashi.
| 3 | "Neko Majin Z" ネコマジンZ | May 2001 | Monthly Shōnen Jump June 2001 |
Neko Majin Z and a boy meet Onio and Honey, a Saiyan couple on their honeymoon. Neko Majin Z dresses as a koala and they try to get the couple to take a picture, but when Neko Majin Z grabs Honey's breasts, Onio gets upset and fights Neko Majin Z. Onio powers up to a Super Saiyan but Neko Majin Z does the same and defeats him.
| 4 | "Neko Majin Z 2" ネコマジンZ2 | August 2003 | Monthly Shōnen Jump September 2003 |
Neko Majin Z challenges celebrity fighter Thunderbolt when Onio returns with Kuriza in "Neko Majin Z 2". They want to fight Neko Majin Z but he is busy challenging Thunderbolt. Kuriza destroys Thunderbolt's car and then transforms to his final form. Neko Majin Z does the same, but they run out of pages to have a proper fight so everyone gives up.
| 5 | "Neko Majin Mike" ネコマジンみけ | August 2003 | Weekly Shōnen Jump 2003 #37–38 |
Neko Majin Mike meets his friend Kojiro, who has become a teacher. Kojiro asks Neko Majin Mike to sub for him in class, but to watch out for bully Asagiri Zame. Neko Majin Mike beats Asagiri easily, then transforms to Kojiro as he leads the class on a field trip and helps Kojiro deal with some shady merchants.
| 6 | "Neko Majin Z 3" ネコマジンZ3 | February 2004 | Monthly Shōnen Jump March 2004 |
Onio and Kuriza convince the visiting Vegeta to fight Neko Majin Z.
| 7 | "Neko Majin Z 4" ネコマジンZ4 | December 2004 | Monthly Shōnen Jump January 2005 |
The boy meets Majin Boo and learns he is quite strong. Neko Majin Z wants to challenge Boo, but they summon Usa Majin instead, who has been absorbing some of the other Neko Majins' Majin-Damas and who extorts Neko Majin Z.
| 8 | "Neko Majin Z 5" ネコマジンZ5 | January 2005 | Monthly Shōnen Jump February 2005 |
Neko Majin Z meets his teacher, Goku; they do some sparring. Goku later asks him for help with a problem that he cannot defeat at home, but it turns out to be chasing down a rat.

== Other media ==
In the Japanese version of the 2003 video game Dragon Ball Z: Budokai 2, Freeza has an alternate outfit where he assumes the form of Kuriza. Neko Majin Z appears as a secret support character in the Japanese version of Dragon Ball Z: Supersonic Warriors 2. In an episode of Dragon Ball Super, the character Majin Boo can be seen reading a book containing the Japanese fairy tale "Urashima Tarō", with Neko Majin in the front cover.
