= Frieza =

Fictional character from Dragon Ball

- Dragon Ball character
- Frieza in his final form (right), as drawn by Akira Toriyama
- First appearance: Dragon Ball chapter #247 "Dark Clouds Swirl Over Planet Namek", October 24, 1989 (Weekly Shōnen Jump 1989)
- Created by: Akira Toriyama
- Voiced by (Japanese): Ryūsei Nakao
- Voiced by (English): Pauline Newstone (Ocean; 1997–1998, 2001–2003); Linda Young (Funimation; 1999–2009); Christopher Ayres (Funimation; 2009–2019); Daman Mills (Funimation; 2018–present); Other: Apollo Abraham (Creative Products Corp.); Jennifer Bain (Blue Water; Dragon Ball GT); Ed Marcus (AB Groupe); Derek Stephen Prince (Bang Zoom!; Dragon Ball Super)

In-universe information
- Species: Frost Demon
- Gender: Genderless (Identifies male)
- Family: Chilled (ancestor; Episode of Bardock); King Cold (father); Cooler (brother; Dragon Ball Z films 5 and 6, Super Dragon Ball Heroes); Kuriza (son; Neko Majin)
- Abilities: Superhuman strength, speed, agility, reflexes, durability, endurance, stamina, and healing; Flight; Energy sensing; Energy projection; Energy absorption; Telepathy; Telekinesis; Transformation
- Archenemy: Son Goku

Frieza (Japanese: フリーザ, Hepburn: Furīza), also spelled as Freeza in Funimation's English subtitles and Viz Media's release of the manga, is a fictional character and one of the main antagonists of the Dragon Ball series created by Akira Toriyama. He makes his debut in Chapter #247: "Dark Clouds Swirl Over Planet Namek", first published in Weekly Shōnen Jump magazine on October 24, 1989, as the main antagonist of his eponymous saga, depicted as a galactic tyrant feared as the most powerful being in the universe.

Despite not appearing until the manga's second half, Frieza is widely considered to be the most iconic and popular villain in Dragon Ball, and the archenemy of Goku – since he effectively catalyzes many of the events depicted in the story, due to the destruction of the Saiyan homeworld Planet Vegeta at his hands and Goku's arrival on Earth and subsequent conflicts with Raditz, Nappa and Vegeta. Frieza later appears as the primary villain in the 2015 film Dragon Ball Z: Resurrection 'F' and as a recurring character in Dragon Ball Super.

== Creation and conception ==
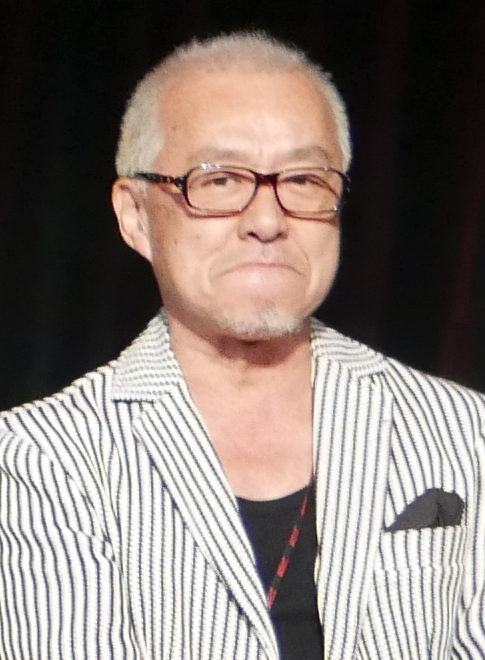
Ryūsei Nakao has been the Japanese voice of Frieza in all Dragon Ball-related media.

Frieza, a broker who forcibly takes over planets to resell them, often rendering the planet's population extinct first, was created around the time of the Japanese economic bubble and was inspired by real estate speculators, whom Toriyama called the "worst kind of people." Toriyama purposely does not draw bad guys so unscrupulous that it affects one psychologically, although he admits Frieza is close. Therefore, he paid special attention to how Frieza spoke; because villains typically speak rudely, he gave him polite speech, making for an unsettling contrast with his cruelty. The character's name is a pun on freezer, and because of this, his minions and the members of the Ginyu Force are named after fruits and dairy products, items one would normally put in a refrigerator. The Shenlong Times issue #2, a bonus pamphlet given to some buyers of the Daizenshuu 2: Story Guide guidebook, says that Frieza was modeled after Toriyama's editor at the time, Yū Kondō.

Toriyama had the idea to bring Frieza back while attending a concert by the metal band Maximum the Hormone. It came to him while watching them perform their 2008 song "F", which is about the fictional character.

Frieza possesses a variety of forms, each one being quite different and more powerful from the previous ones. It is implied that Frieza's fourth form is actually his basic one, with the other three being transformations that suppress his power in order to conserve it, while the fifth one unleashes his true power. Toriyama revealed that he did not think to have Frieza transform until about midway through. He said he has a habit of making characters gradually more tough and complex-looking, until finally making them very sleek, as it is a pain to draw them if their appearance is too complex. The author confirmed this is why Frieza's third and most intricate form is only shown for a short time, and joked that three transformations might be one too many.

=== Voice actors ===
In the original Japanese version, Frieza is voiced by Ryūsei Nakao in every single piece of Dragon Ball media.

In English, Frieza was voiced by Pauline Newstone in the Ocean dub of Dragon Ball Z. In Funimation's in-house English dub, Frieza was voiced by Linda Young in the Dragon Ball Z series and continued playing him in all subsequent media up until the first episode of Dragon Ball Z Kai. Christopher Ayres voiced the character in later episodes of Kai and all subsequent media through Dragon Ball Super. Due to being diagnosed with end-stage COPD (chronic obstructive pulmonary disease) and requiring a double lung transplant, Ayres was forced to step down from the role in 2018. He briefly reprised the role in 2019 for Dragon Ball Super: Broly and the home media releases of the Universal Survival Saga of Dragon Ball Super before dying in 2021. Ayres' understudy Daman Mills, who has a strong ability to imitate Ayres, assumed the role, beginning with the television broadcast of the Universal Survival Saga, and has voiced Frieza indefinitely in all subsequent appearances, with the exception of Broly.

== Appearances ==
=== Dragon Ball Z ===
Before the start of the series, Frieza destroys Planet Vegeta out of both fear of a potential uprising by the Saiyans due to their increasing power, and the prophecy of the coming of the legendary Super Saiyan, and Lord Beerus telling and instigating him to destroy Planet Vegeta. Frieza only knowingly spares Vegeta, Nappa, and Raditz, who were away on a mission when he blew Planet Vegeta up, after telling them it was struck by a meteor. However, when Bardock made a final stand when Frieza destroyed Planet Vegeta, he did not notice the Saiyan's second son being sent to Earth, where he became known as Goku.

Frieza makes his official appearance in the story after Vegeta's defeat on Earth at Goku's hands, having traveled to Planet Namek to find the seven Namekian Dragon Balls to wish for immortality. He and his men massacre Namekian villages one after another, until Gohan, Krillin, and Vegeta begin to hamper his efforts in their way. Though Frieza manages to gain the Dragon Balls, with the Ginyu Force dealing with the interlopers, his inability to speak Namekian forces him to find the Great Elder of Namek. Frieza ends up fighting Namekian warrior Nail, whom he beats repeatedly until Nail reveals that their fight was only to buy time for Dende to give the words needed to activate the Namekian Dragon Balls, for the warriors from Earth. With his entire army killed by Vegeta and the Ginyu Force defeated by Goku, Frieza intercepts Vegeta and the others personally.

Enraged to find he is too late, as the Dragon Balls have become inert on Guru's death, Frieza briefly battles Vegeta, with the Saiyan Prince goading him into transforming and revealing his true power. Frieza transforms into his second form, and during the battle, he finally admits to being the one who had destroyed the planet where the Saiyans had settled. After defeating Vegeta, Frieza takes on Piccolo, who has at this point fused with Nail. Although Piccolo appears to be even with him, he transforms into his third form and dominates the powerful Namekian. Following a brief tussle with Gohan, Frieza decides to transform into his final form. He kills Dende to stop him from healing the others and mortally wounds Vegeta just as Goku arrives, who just recovered following his fight with the Ginyu Force. Frieza fights Goku and the two seem evenly matched, but Frieza powers up to 50% of his maximum power and brutally beats him; however, Goku manages to seriously wound the tyrant with a Spirit Bomb. In retaliation, Frieza critically injures Piccolo and kills Krillin, which sends Goku into a rage, consequently assuming Super Saiyan form for the first time. Goku takes the upper hand and viciously pummels Frieza, who damages the core of Namek in an act of desperation, knowing he can survive in the vacuum of space. The tyrant then uses 100% of his power and briefly regains the advantage, but his power level begins to drop and he is again outclassed by Goku and ultimately sliced in half by one of his own attacks. Though Goku spares the crippled Frieza while leaving for his ship to escape the planet's destruction, Frieza attempts to blast Goku from behind, prompting Goku to retaliate with his own attack that apparently destroys Frieza.

However, Frieza survives both the attack and Namek's explosion and drifts through space until he is found by his father King Cold (コルド大王, Korudo Daiō), who was on his way to Namek to aid him against Goku. Over the next year, Frieza is rebuilt with cybernetic prosthetics, increasing his strength significantly, and the two immediately head for Earth to exact revenge on Goku and his friends, but they are confronted by Trunks, the son of Vegeta and Bulma, who has traveled back to their time from the future. After a brief battle, Frieza is sliced to pieces by Trunks and his remains are blasted into oblivion, with his father following shortly afterward. Though finally gone, Frieza's cells are later used as a catalyst for the future villain Cell. Cell is eventually destroyed by Gohan, thereby destroying the last traces of Frieza's biological tissue.

In the original unaltered timeline where Goku dies of a viral heart disease, Frieza and King Cold are intercepted and killed on Earth by Goku, who arrived via Instant Transmission, and Cell is later killed by Future Trunks.

=== Dragon Ball Z: Resurrection 'F' / Dragon Ball Super ===
Ending up in Earth's Hell after being killed by Future Trunks, Frieza spends the next fourteen years being tortured by the playful antics of an overly saccharine cadre of angels and fairies while reliving the memories of his defeats at the hands of Goku and Trunks. Frieza is resurrected by Sorbet, who saw Frieza's return as essential to restore the Frieza Force to its former glory, and his right hand, Tagoma. The two then bring Frieza's diced Mecha Frieza form to their ship, where they use their advanced medical technology to restore him to his full organic form. After learning that Goku defeated Majin Buu and fought Beerus to a stalemate, both being the two figures his father warned him never to cross, Frieza decides to undergo four months of intensive training. This led to him achieving a new form, which he dubs "Golden Frieza," before setting off for Earth with his army. The Z Fighters hold back Tagoma and Frieza's minions long enough for Goku and Vegeta to return from their training session on Beerus's planet. Frieza executes his defeated army for their incompetence just as Goku, Vegeta, Beerus, and Whis arrive. Goku reveals his new Super Saiyan Blue form, although Frieza overpowers him, yet he lacks the stamina for a prolonged fight in his powered state. He then has Sorbet shoot Goku, forcing Vegeta to take up his place. Vegeta nearly kills Frieza, who instead causes his death by destroying Earth. Whis rewinds time so Goku can quickly kill off Frieza before he destroys the planet. Frieza returns to Hell, where he is once more tormented by the angels. Frieza appears in the manga adaption omake alongside Sorbet and Susami in Hell.

Frieza later returns in the Universal Tournament Arc as a replacement member for the Seventh Universe team after Majin Buu is ineligible to fight due to having fallen into a deep sleep from which nobody could wake him, revealed to have mentally trained himself to maintain his Golden form. When approached by Goku, who is arranging for him to be temporarily revived by Fortuneteller Baba for a day, Frieza accepts the offer on the condition of being fully resurrected by the Dragon Balls after the tournament. Upon being revived, Frieza slaughters a group of assassins hired by the deities of the Ninth Universe to kill him while trapping Goku in a Destroyer-based energy attack meant for him. He then attempted to offer his services to the Ninth Universe deities in return for a place in their universe until Beerus and Whis appeared. Despite Beerus's reservations, Goku vouches for him as they join the rest of their team.

As the tournament commences, Frieza meets his Sixth Universe counterpart Frost (フロスト, Furosuto), a con artist who posed as a hero until a previous contest between the Seventh and Sixth Universes exposed his criminal activities and forced him into hiding. Frieza tricks Frost into believing they have forged an alliance to take out the Saiyans, proceeding to take out both the Ninth Universe's Roselle and the Tenth Universe's Murichim as the tournament commences. After eliminating Frost when he appears to commence their arrangement, Frieza eventually ends up being one of the four remaining combatants alongside Goku, Android 17, and Jiren of the Eleventh Universe. Frieza unexpectedly teams up with Goku to force Jiren out in a triple elimination, with 17 declared the winner, resurrected soon after by Whis at Beerus's behest as a reward for his efforts. Frieza then takes his leave to begin rebuilding his empire, but is warned by Goku that he will be destroyed if he ever torments the universe again.

During the events of the film Dragon Ball Super: Broly, Frieza starts rebuilding the Frieza Force while deciding to use Earth's Dragon Balls to make a wish to increase his height by five centimeters, having become disillusioned with the idea of eternal life from his time in Earth's Hell. Frieza recruits the Saiyan Broly and his father Paragus, who accompany him to Earth for the last Dragon Ball, realizing the former's potential as he matched Goku and Vegeta in their Super Saiyan Blue forms. This inspires Frieza to kill Paragus to force Broly's transformation into a Super Saiyan, only to be caught in Broly's rampage after the latter quickly defeats Goku. Frieza is saved at the last second by Gogeta, a merged warrior between Goku and Vegeta created when they perform the fusion dance technique, who thwarts his attempt to kill off his former subordinates Cheelai and Lemo when they use the Dragon Balls to save Broly's life by wishing him off the planet. Frieza falls back while deciding not to go after Cheelai and Lemo, as he intends to use them to make Broly docile enough for him to use against Goku in the future.

Years later, Frieza is contacted by a former subordinate named Elec to meet him and his group on planet Cereal. Meanwhile, Elec wishes for his younger brother, Gas, to be the strongest warrior in the universe. After Elec sets up a trap to have Granolah and Gas kill Goku and Vegeta, Frieza arrives and murders Gas. Frieza then kills Elec after revealing that he was aware of the latter's plan to assassinate him. Frieza reveals to Goku and Vegeta that he had found a place very similar to the Room of Spirit and Time on a distant planet and trained in the room for 10 years in just a matter of days, which is why Elec's wish did not take him into account at the time it was granted. Frieza presents his new form, Black Frieza (ブラックフリーザ, Burakku Furīza), before knocking Goku and Vegeta to the ground, sparing the Saiyans as he only traveled to kill Elec and Gas before leaving Cereal.

== Abilities ==
Frieza is capable of moving at superhuman speeds and flying, and has quick reflexes. Like most characters in the series, he can harness a supernatural energy known as Ki and manipulate it into powerful and devastating concussive beams of said energy, with which he can destroy planets with relative ease. Some of Frieza's signature ki techniques include the Death Beam (デスビーム, Desu Bīmu), a sharp, piercing beam from his finger, and the Death Ball (デスボール, Desu Bōru), a large energy sphere he used to destroy Planet Namek and, before that, Planet Vegeta. He is capable of surviving in the vacuum of space and also seems to possess some form of telekinesis, being able to lift opponents without touching them and causing them to explode.

Frieza's power was so great over time that his body could not comfortably contain it, and a series of physical transformations were developed that limit his actual strength. While changing shape from his "first form", each alteration builds on the previous. In all, Frieza has three transformed states, each with increasing power, some larger than others, and each resulting in different physical attributes, although the two transformed states (along with his first form) were merely to suppress Frieza's power, and that his fourth transformed state is his true form, while a fifth and later sixth further transformation that he discovers after performing vigorous times of training that increase his power drastically and lets out most of his latent strength.

First form

Frieza's first through third forms, from right to left.

In his weakest form, Frieza is a relatively short humanoid with a large chestnut-shaped skull and two horns. He also has a tail with a spiked end, as well as three talon-like toes. Frieza wears the same upper-body armor and shorts that many of his subordinates are shown to wear, and while traveling, often gives the appearance of weakness by exclusively using his hoverchair for transportation, leaving his henchmen to do his "dirty work". Though frail in comparison with his succeeding forms, Frieza still boasts sufficient force to destroy planets. While shifting to his next stage, Frieza breaks his battle-jacket, revealing a natural white armor covering his chest and shoulders.

Frieza's 6th Universe counterpart, Frost, also initially appears in this form.

Second form

His second form is much larger, both in height and muscle mass. He grows longer horns, which now, instead of protruding sideways from his head, curve sharply upwards into near right angles. In this form, Frieza does not have any trouble taking out Vegeta, Krillin, and Gohan. However, Frieza notices that Piccolo's power level is about equal to his level, leaving Frieza with no choice but to transform again. This form largely resembles his father, King Cold.

Frieza's 6th Universe counterpart Frost also takes on a second form; however, it bears a greater resemblance to Frieza's third form and is said to be the equivalent of it by Piccolo.

Third form

Frieza's third form is again more brutish, with an extremely elongated skull (like a xenomorph). His facial features contort and change, with his nose melding into his mouth to form a crude beak. His original horns recede and are now white, erupting in pairs along the length of his head. Despite his increased bulk, Frieza's speed is significantly higher in this form, easily outpacing Piccolo even after the Namek fighter removed his weighted training clothes. His tail tip, which had been cut off by Krillin, did not regenerate, and he now has a slight hunch. Although his tail was surprisingly not regenerated, the rest of his wounds disappeared as if nothing ever touched him.

Fourth form

Drastically differing from his previous transformations, in his final, true form, Frieza's third form (being more like a shell for this final form) cracks and shatters open, revealing a shorter and less bulky appearance. His horns and spikes disappear with his physique becoming entirely streamlined, and his skin is now a pure, solid white with purple sections on his head, shoulders, forearms, chest, and shins. All injuries taken in other forms have healed. This is the form that allows him to release his full potential. Frieza can attain 100% power in this form, making his muscle mass engorged compared to his previously sleek frame. This is the peak of Frieza's natural potential, and the maximum amount of energy his body can output. In this state, Frieza's power increases immensely, making him able to inflict damage to even Super Saiyan Goku and match him in terms of strength and speed. However, to unleash his full power, Frieza needs to subject his body to a muscle strain that drains his energy rather quickly, making him rapidly lose speed and stamina as the fight goes on, and because of this issue, Frieza can't keep up with Super Saiyan Goku for long. Being aware of this weakness, Frieza tries to finish the fight as quickly as possible by destroying Planet Namek, but the Saiyan can defeat him.

Frieza's 6th Universe counterpart, Frost, also briefly uses this form during the Tournament of Power.

Mecha Frieza

After being cut in half by his own attack and being caught in Namek's huge explosion, what remains of the still-living Frieza is salvaged and rebuilt with cybernetic enhancements by scientists under the order of King Cold; this form is referred to as Mecha Frieza (メカフリーザ) in video games. The whole of the lower half of his body and the right side of his face are replaced, as is his left arm from the shoulder down, with scarring and metal accoutrements covering what little was left of his organic self. It is stated that these enhancements have made him even more powerful. However, he was never able to unleash his full power in this form, since he was quickly destroyed by Trunks.

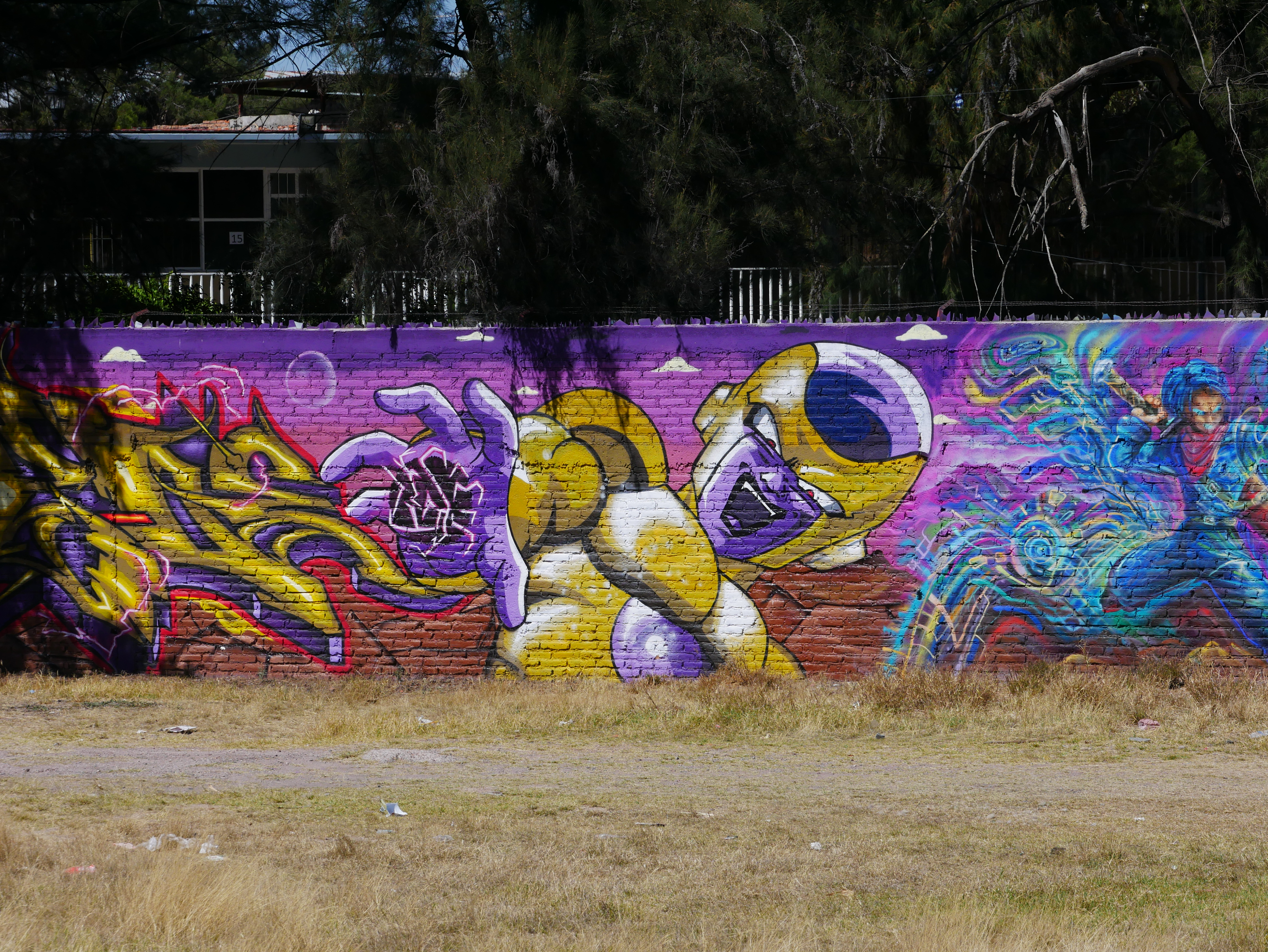
Mural Golden Frieza

Golden Frieza

Frieza attains another transformation in the 2015 film Dragon Ball Z: Resurrection 'F' and Dragon Ball Super. According to Frieza, his sixth transformation is achieved after undergoing intensive training for four months, enabling him to gain the strength to progress even further beyond his previous transformations by drawing out all of his latent power (as he had never trained a day in his life beforehand). In this form, Frieza's physique is similar to his previous fourth form except his skin is now a golden color as opposed to white, with purple sections on his head, chest, forearms, and shins, thus he is known as "Golden Frieza" (ゴールデンフリーザ, Gōruden Furīza) in this form. Also, his muscles appear bigger and more defined while in this form, though not as engorged as they became when he used 100% of his power on Namek. In this form at peak power, Frieza can overpower Goku in his Super Saiyan Blue form with relative ease. However, much like when he used 100% of his power in his fourth form, the transformation quickly drains Frieza's energy and stamina due to him not training himself further to become accustomed to the form, and thus is unsuitable for prolonged combat, as he soon finds himself unable to compete with Goku and Vegeta in their Super Saiyan Blue forms. After his second revival in the Tournament of Power Saga, Frieza reveals he mastered his Golden form due to intense meditation while in hell. This "True Golden Frieza" can be used indefinitely without any drain on Frieza's stamina or even while he is barely conscious.

Black Frieza

Frieza attains this form in Dragon Ball Super during the Granolah the Survivor saga. In Dragon Ball Super: Broly, Vegeta had foreshadowed the possibility that Frieza would take advantage of his restored life following the Tournament of Power to acquire a new form. When he transforms into Black Frieza, his physique appears slightly more muscular compared to his final form, his limbs and tail get darkened a grayish black, while the rest of his body retains his final form's coloration. Another difference from his Golden form is the purple sections on his shoulders. According to Frieza, this new transformation was achieved when he found a Room of Spirit and Time by chance on one of his conquered planets and used it to undergo a 10-year training session within 10 days. Frieza uses this transformation to kill Gas and defeat Goku and Vegeta, in their Ultra Instinct and Ultra Ego states, knocking them both out simultaneously in a single attack.

== Appearances in other media ==
In numerous filler episodes of the anime and Dragon Ball GT, Frieza makes numerous cameo appearances, usually as comic relief, causing trouble in Hell, having somehow been permitted to keep his body despite his wrongdoings. In Hell, he is defeated and sent to prison by Goku and Pikkon along with Cell, his father, and the Ginyu Force, and he is later seen watching Goku's final battle with Majin Buu in a crystal ball, comically hoping for Goku to lose (this appearance is later contradicted in Resurrection "F" and its Dragon Ball Super adaptation, where Frieza is depicted as unaware that Goku fought and defeated Buu, although for flashback sequences and such, Super alludes to Dragon Ball Z Kai, where most filler material has been cut). In Dragon Ball Z: Fusion Reborn, Frieza briefly escapes from Hell with an army of villains to attack Earth, but he is swiftly defeated by Gohan. In Dragon Ball GT, when Goku is sent to Hell by accident, Frieza and Cell confront him, their bodies having been rendered temporarily immortal due to the unbalance between the two worlds. Using a joint attack, Frieza and Cell send Goku to a lower level where he is frozen by a witch, but the two villains end up frozen themselves when they foolishly venture downwards to gloat at Goku. Goku accidentally breaks the ice holding Frieza and Cell, and it shatters into pieces, implying that Frieza and Cell have been erased from existence. However, in a future scene, Frieza and Cell are seen being taken away in a jail cell with tape over their mouths and appear in the live-action GT show, where he and Cell gain new forms to track down Goku. He appeared in a TV ad for Dragon Ball Z: Battle of Gods, as he makes a non-speaking appearance in the film.

He also appears in a chapter of Toriyama's Neko Majin manga, published in August 2003, which also introduces Frieza's son, Kuriza (クリーザ). He briefly appears in the 2006 Dragon Ball crossover chapter, "This is the Police Station in front of Dragon Park on Planet Namek" (こちらナメック星ドラゴン公園前派出所, Kochira Namekku-sei Dragon Kōen-mae Hashutsujo), of Osamu Akimoto's manga Kochira Katsushika-ku Kameari Kōen-mae Hashutsujo. Frieza appears in Naho Ōishi's 2011 Dragon Ball spin-off manga Episode of Bardock, but it predominately features his ancestor Chilled (チルド). He also appears in Toriyama's 2014 Dragon Ball Minus: The Departure of the Fated Child special.

Frieza has made numerous appearances in other media. The Japanese nu metal/hardcore punk band Maximum the Hormone released the song "F" as part of a double A-side single on July 9, 2008. The entirety of the song references Frieza, with the single itself rising as high as number two on the Oricon music chart. The song was the source of reference used by Toriyama for the title of the film Fukkatsu no F and is featured in the movie. Seikima-II frontman Demon Kakka wrote and performed the song "Tada Kogoeru Elegy ~The Theme of Frieza~" (ただ凍える挽歌(Elegy)〜The Theme Of FREEZER〜) that appeared in two episodes of Dragon Ball Kai and on the 2009 Dragon Ball Kai Song Collection album.

In the manga Black Cat, the character Sven Vollfied is often seen using his cell phone with a wrist strap of a miniature-sized badge of Frieza's head. A caricature of Frieza mixed with a grey alien was parodied as a mech pilot in an episode of Magical Shopping Arcade Abenobashi. The anime Yakitate!! Japan featured a spoof re-enactment of the fight between Goku and Frieza, with a character clad in a refrigerator representing the latter. The Cartoon Network show Codename: Kids Next Door had a parody of their own of the climactic fight and the Frieza character, with the Delightful Children From Down the Lane portraying him as a multi-headed monstrosity.

=== Video games ===
Frieza has been featured in many of the video games based on the series. Often, he appears as both a playable character and boss, though more frequently the latter. He is also usually able to transform into his many different forms.

Frieza appears in the Famicom game (and later Playdia remake) Dragon Ball Z Gaiden: Saiyajin Zetsumetsu Keikaku. Frieza seems to be somehow resurrected, and he and other past villains start attacking Goku and his friends. Once it's revealed that these are merely ghost-warriors meant to distract the heroes, however, the false Frieza and his allies are easily dealt with. Other games highlight Frieza in alternate story paths; including those where he successfully attains immortality and goes on to threaten Earth such as Dragon Ball Z: Budokai, and Dragon Ball Z: Budokai 2 where Frieza and Cell are resurrected and controlled by Bobbidi as a distraction for the player.

Frieza also appears as a playable character in the crossover fighting games Jump Ultimate Stars, Battle Stadium D.O.N, J-Stars Victory Vs, and Jump Force.

== Reception ==
Yū Kondō, Toriyama's second editor from the Saiyan arc until the appearance of Perfect Cell, and Fuyuto Takeda, his third editor from Perfect Cell until the end of the series, said that Dragon Ball hit its peak in popularity during the Frieza arc. In a one-thousand ballot popularity poll held in Weekly Shōnen Jump, Dragon Ball received 815 of them. In 2004, fans of the series voted Frieza the ninth most popular character for a poll in the book Dragon Ball Forever. Frieza topped a poll of Dragon Ball antagonists by fan vote, the results of which was published by the March 2018 issue of V Jump.

Frieza was mentioned as one of the "most beloved characters" in an article by GamePro. The casting and direction of his English voices has often been criticized over the years, with IGN's Ramsey Isler writing that, coupled with the ambiguous physical features, the "old lady" voice led to some gender confusion with fans. The Ledger's December 8, 1999, paper names him as one of the reasons that Dragon Ball Z was listed as a violent show for children, stating, "In one recent episode, beads of sweat form on the brow of a character named Vegeta, as he is nearly strangled to death by an evil foe named Frieza. In another, Frieza uses the horns on his head to impale a good guy named Krillin through the chest." The paper also comments on Frieza's appearance: "Little Gohan is abruptly in the icy metallic grip of one of his arch-nemeses, Frieza, a silvery androgynous giant who looks like a cross between the monster in Alien and Batman's Mr. Freeze." Comic Book Resources regarded Frieza's role in the original series as the reason why his arc is one of the darkest ever in the franchise due to the violence in fights, deaths and resolution of his fight against Goku, giving it an improvement in retrospect. Both Kotaku and Den of Geek regarded Frieza as the series' most entertaining villain in the entire series which led to the staff to revive him multiple times in order to appeal to returning fans.

Response to Frieza's revival in Resurrection F has been mixed to negative. DVD Talk enjoyed the rematch between Frieza and Goku in Resurrection F but still lamented that its length was too much when compared with other subplots. IGN was more positive in regards Frieza's new powers and rivalry with Goku. Anime News Network lamented Frieza's role as he felt that he barely gave a decent fight in the movie as the writing fails to portray him as a menacing villain with the new powers of Goku and Vegeta easily surpassing him alongside other plot devices like the healing beans. In regards to the voice actors, "Ayres' brand of childish pompousness is a lot less threatening in a story where Frieza isn't in a position of power from the get-go. Ryusei Nakao's slightly more adult tone works a little better in this instance." Den of Geek found the fight between Goku's allies and Frieza's army as the best part of the movie in contrast to the lead's fights which he felt was "standard" to the point it gets "boring".

For the final arc of Dragon Ball Super, Anime News Network had mixed feelings about the second return of Frieza to have him teamed up with Universe 7. It felt that while Frieza might be turning into a Dragon Ball cliche where most characters such as Yamcha, Tien Shinhan, Chiaotzu, Piccolo, Vegeta and Majin Buu served as villains before becoming heroes, his actions were still ambiguous and it was satisfying to see him engage with Goku on a one-on-one to settle their rules in the Tournament of Power. Hobby Consolas commented that Frieza was overpowered by Jiren so many times that it became tiring to see. However, Frieza's team-up with Goku to force their enemy out of the tournament's arena was found surprising for how such characters who have hated each other for years have decided to join forces to the point that even Vegeta is shocked at seeing this. IGN noted that Frieza was absent through so many episodes of the final arc and praised his team up with Goku not only due to their differences but also animation highlights. However, the fact that Frieza is not only revived but also given his own empire back left the reviewer in a dilemma in regards to the impact it might give the franchise in the future, due to whether or not he will keep being evil as he kept interacting with Goku for a long time. Cine Premiere agreed that Frieza's future actions might be up to debate.

== Bibliography ==
- Dragon Ball Z manga, Volume 5 — ISBN 1-56931-934-0
- Dragon Ball Z manga, Volume 6 — ISBN 1-56931-935-9
- Dragon Ball Z manga, Volume 7 — ISBN 1-56931-936-7
- Dragon Ball Z manga, Volume 8 — ISBN 1-56931-937-5
- Dragon Ball Z manga, Volume 9 — ISBN 1-56931-938-3
- Dragon Ball Z manga, Volume 10 — ISBN 1-56931-939-1
- Dragon Ball Z manga, Volume 11 — ISBN 1-56931-807-7
- Dragon Ball Z manga, Volume 12 — ISBN 1-56931-985-5
