= Bandai RX-78 =

1983 microcomputer model

- Manufacturer: Bandai
- Type: Home computer
- Generation: Third
- Released: July 1983
- Introductory price: ¥59,800 (Japan)
- Media: Cartridges, Compact Cassette
- Operating system: BS-BASIC
- CPU: SHARP LH0080A (Z80A) @ 4.1 MHz
- Memory: 30KB RAM; 8KB ROM
- Graphics: 192 × 184, 27 colors
- Sound: SN76489 (3× voices (4 octaves) with 1 noise generator)
- Connectivity: 2× Joystick, 1× RF, 1× RCA, 2× ROM cartridge
- Power: 10W
- Predecessor: Bandai Arcadia
- Successor: Playdia

The Bandai RX-78 is a Japanese 8-bit microcomputer manufactured by Bandai. Its name comes from the RX-78-2 Gundam.

It was released in July 1983, the RX-78 had a release cost of 59,800 yen, and was sold with a dozen of games and software, including a BASIC interpreter cartridge featuring a cassette tape interface.

The Bandai RX-78 was primarily a gaming machine, with two joysticks included. Software was available on cartridges or cassettes.

== Specifications ==
The Bandai RX-78 employed a SHARP LH0080A (Zilog Z80A clone) CPU, running a clock speed of 4.1 MHz. It shipped with 30 KB of RAM and 8KB of ROM. It had two joystick ports in a proprietary format using 8-pin DIN connectors.

The computer can generate 27 colors, created from 3 levels of intensity of each RGB channel, arranged into VRAM video planes, with a maximum resolution of 192 × 184 pixels, and is capable of displaying 30 × 23 text characters using a 6 × 8 pixel font. Sound was generated by the Texas Instruments SN76489 chip, providing 3 voices in four octaves and noise generator.

== Software ==
Software was released on ROM cartridges (Sen'you Soft Cartridge) and compact cassettes (Sen'you Tape Cassette).

=== Games ===
About 20 games for the Bandai RX-78 were released:

- Cannon Ball (Sen'you Soft Cartridge)
- Card World (Sen'you Soft Cartridge)
- Challenge Golf (Sen'you Soft Cartridge)
- Champion Racer (Sen'you Soft Cartridge)
- Combined Fleet/ Rengo Kantai (Sen'you Soft Cartridge)
- Donjara (Sen'you Tape Cassette)
- Excite Baseball (Sen'you Soft Cartridge)
- Excite Tennis (Sen'you Soft Cartridge)
- Fight! Ultraman/ Tatakae! Ultraman (Sen'you Soft Cartridge)
- Hamburger Shop (Sen'you Soft Cartridge)
- Mobile Suit Gundam: Luna Two no Tatakai (Sen'you Soft Cartridge)
- Perfect Mah-jongg (Sen'you Soft Cartridge)
- The Pro-Wrestling (Sen'you Soft Cartridge)
- Sekigahara (Sen'you Soft Cartridge)
- Sheep/ Hitsuji Yaai (Sen'you Tape Cassette)
- Space Capsule (Sen'you Tape Cassette)
- Space Enemy (Sen'you Soft Cartridge)
- Super Motocross (Sen'you Soft Cartridge)
- Yellow Cab (Sen'you Tape Cassette)
- Zero Fighter/ Zerosen (Sen'you Soft Cartridge)

=== Educational (Education Series) ===
A smaller number of non-gaming titles were released:

- ABC Tangou Game (Sen'you Soft Cartridge)
- Graphic Sugaku (Sen'you Tape Cassette)
- Keisan Enshuu Drill (Sen'you Tape Cassette)
- Sansu Tsuma Zuki

=== Applications (Culture Series) ===
A smaller number of non-gaming titles were released:

- 3-Dimension Graphics (Sen'you Soft Cartridge)
- Animation Graphics (Sen'you Soft Cartridge)
- BS BASIC Ver.1.0 (Sen'you Soft Cartridge)
- Creative Graphics (Sen'you Soft Cartridge)
- Healthy Life Plan (Sen'you Tape Cassette)
- Kanji Word Processor
- Music Master (Sen'you Soft Cartridge)
- Z80 Assembler
