= Dragon Ball: Episode of Bardock =

2011 manga series and film

ドラゴンボール エピソード オブ バーダック (Doragon Bōru Episōdo obu Bādakku)
- Created by: Akira Toriyama
- Manga
- Written by: Naho Ōishi
- Published by: Shueisha
- Magazine: V Jump
- Original run: June 21, 2011 – August 21, 2011
- Volumes: 1
- Anime film
- Directed by: Yoshihiro Ueda
- Produced by: Kazuhiko Torishima
- Written by: Makoto Koyama
- Music by: Hiroshi Takaki
- Studio: Toei Animation
- Released: December 17, 2011
- Runtime: 20 minutes

Dragon Ball: Episode of Bardock (Japanese: ドラゴンボール エピソード オブ バーダック, Hepburn: Doragon Bōru Episōdo obu Bādakku) is a three-chapter Japanese manga series written and illustrated by Naho Ōishi, based on Akira Toriyama's Dragon Ball. It serves as a what-if spin-off sequel to the 1990 animated television special Dragon Ball Z: Bardock – The Father of Goku. Bardock, having survived the destruction of his home planet, is sent into the past to a strange planet where he battles Frieza's ancestor, Chilled.

The manga was serialized in V Jump in three chapters between June 21 and August 21, 2011. It was adapted into a short anime film by Toei Animation that premiered on December 17, 2011, at Jump Festa 2012. The film was released internationally in October 2012, as a subtitled extra to the Xbox 360 video game Dragon Ball Z: For Kinect.

== Plot summary ==
Bardock, having somehow survived certain death when Frieza obliterated Planet Vegeta, wakes up in a small village house. A purple-colored creature enters the room and introduces himself as Ipana. He tells Bardock that he is on the Planet Plant, which – as the confused Bardock recalls – was the former name of Planet Vegeta before it was annexed by the Saiyans. Suddenly the village comes under attack by henchmen of the space pirate Chilled whom Bardock easily defeats, earning him the gratitude of the villagers. Uninterested in being a hero, he flees to a nearby cave to recover. Ipana's son Berry brings him food and eventually they grow friendly with one another despite Bardock's reluctance.

Chilled learns that his henchmen have been killed and after the villagers fail to find Bardock on Chilled's orders, he and his henchmen start attacking them and destroying the village. Bardock initially refuses to save them but after Berry begs him, he flies to the village and saves Ipana, who was nearly killed by Chilled. Due to the resemblance, Bardock mistakes Chilled for Frieza and attacks him but Chilled proves too powerful. However, after Chilled fires an energy attack at Berry, Bardock becomes enraged and transforms into a Super Saiyan. Chilled attacks Bardock with his energy blasts which have no effect on the Super Saiyan. Chilled launches a final desperate attack in order to destroy the planet, but Bardock's attack overpowers it and sends the mortally wounded Chilled soaring into outer space. The dying Chilled tells his henchmen to warn his family about Super Saiyans.

Centuries later, Chilled's descendent Frieza would destroy Planet Vegeta out of fear that a Super Saiyan of legend would rise to defeat him. Bardock's son, Goku, would assume the Super Saiyan form and defeat Frieza more than twenty years later.

== Characters ==
Bardock (バーダック, Bādakku)
Voiced by: Masako Nozawa
The father of Son Goku and Raditz, who was thought to be killed by Frieza.
Berry (ベリー, Berī)
Voiced by: Houko Kuwashima
He is the son of the village doctor Ipana, who treats Bardock. Toriyama provided the design for Berry.
Ipana (イパナ)
Voiced by: Masashi Ebara
The village doctor, who treats Bardock. Toriyama provided the design for Ipana.
Chilled (チルド, Chirudo)
Voiced by: Ryūsei Nakao
He is an ancestor of Frieza and a space pirate. Toriyama provided the design for Chilled.

== Release ==
Dragon Ball: Episode of Bardock was serialized in V Jump, with the first chapter released on June 21, 2011, the second on July 22 and the third on August 21. On November 21, 2011, it was announced that the manga would be given an anime adaptation by Toei Animation. The short film premiered on December 17–18, 2011 at Jump Festa 2012. Kazuhiko Torishima, Akira Toriyama's former editor and a former editor-in-chief of both Weekly Shōnen Jump and V Jump, served as producer. The movie later received a coupled home video DVD release with Dragon Ball: Plan to Eradicate the Super Saiyans included in the March issue of the magazine Saikyō Jump, which was released on February 3, 2012.

The entire manga was re-printed in the April 2012 issue of V Jump, released on February 21, 2012, with a slightly different ending which follows that of the film. The film was included subtitled in the European and North American exclusive Xbox 360 video game Dragon Ball Z: For Kinect, released in October 2012. The March 2014 issue of Saikyō Jump included a kanzenban version of the 2012 reprint of Dragon Ball: Episode of Bardock.

On June 20, 2018, the Episode of Bardock film was released in France on DVD and Blu-ray as part of the Golden Box Dragon Ball Z steelbook set published by Kazé. The set also contains Dragon Ball: Plan to Eradicate the Super Saiyans, Dragon Ball Z: Battle of Gods, and Dragon Ball Z: Resurrection 'F'.
