= Super Dragon Ball Heroes (web series) =

2018 anime

スーパードラゴンボールヒーローズ (Sūpā Doragon Bōru Hīrōzu)
- Original net animation
- Produced by: Hiroyuki Sakurada
- Written by: Yūki Kadota (#1–19); Yoshiyuki Suzuki (#20–56)
- Music by: Yūya Mori
- Studio: Toei Animation
- Released: July 1, 2018 – August 8, 2024
- Episodes: 56
- Media franchise
- List of all Dragon Ball series; List of all Dragon Ball films; List of all Dragon Ball video games; List of all Dragon Ball soundtracks
- icon

Super Dragon Ball Heroes (Japanese: スーパードラゴンボールヒーローズ, Hepburn: Sūpā Doragon Bōru Hīrōzu) is a Japanese original net animation and promotional anime series for the card and video games of the same name. 56 episodes were released from July 2018 to August 2024. It was produced by Toei Animation without the involvement of Dragon Ball creator Akira Toriyama.

The series explores several alternate scenarios within the franchise. It transitioned into a 'promotional CG movie' late in its run due to its 2D animation staff being required for Dragon Ball Daima.

== Plot ==
=== Prison Planet Arc ===
The storyline of Super Dragon Ball Heroes is an alternate continuation of the Dragon Ball Super storyline after the Universe Survival arc. Following the Tournament of Power, Goku and Vegeta are training with Whis when Future Mai arrives telling them that Future Trunks was captured. After that, a mysterious figure named Fu appears telling them that Future Trunks is being held captive on the Prison Planet. Fu brings them to Prison Planet only for it to be revealed that this was all a plan of his to gain research for his experiments. They get into fights with others, encountering another Goku and Vegeta called "Xeno Goku" and "Xeno Vegeta" who work for the Time Patrol and an evil Saiyan called Cumber. Eventually the fights become so dangerous the Prison Planet starts to collapse. Goku is left behind on the planet while the other get back to Beerus's planet.

=== Universal Conflict Arc ===
After the battle on Prison Planet, Vegeta and Trunks go to Universes 6 and 11 to help Cabba, Caulifla, Kale, Hit, Jiren and Toppo deal with the Tuffle Neo Machine twins Oren and Kamin while Goku, who survived Prison Planet's destruction arrives at the Grand Minister who trains him to better handle Ultra Instinct. After the battle, the group all rejoin in Universe 7 to take on the leader of the villains Hearts, who uses a Universe Seed to achieve a power that would allow him to destroy the Omni-King. In the end, Goku and Vegeta fuse into Gogeta to defeat Hearts and save the universe.

=== New Space-Time War Arc ===
Goku awakens in the new Space-Time dimensions where he encounters Hearts, having been brought back to the living world by Demigra. Goku and Hearts team up to find the duplicate Dragon Balls in hopes of using them to escape. they encounter and fight several enemies including Frieza, Cooler, Goku Black as well and encountering a masked Saiyan. Eventually, they find all the Dragon Balls and escape back into the real world where he encounters Fu, having absorbed Dogidogi to achieve more power and being turned into a younger version of himself. Fu then absorbs the energy of the Universe Tree to win but Goku manipulates the energy into his own and defeats Fu. Chronoa then uses the power of Toki-Toki to restore the Universe Tree.

=== Supreme Kai of Time Arc ===
After Fu's defeat, warriors and fighters from all over the space-time gather to participate in the Super Space-Time Tournament planned by Aeos, the former Supreme Kai of Time. Goku and his allies face off against very powerful enemies.

=== Demon Invader Arc ===
After the Super Space-Time Tournament, Goku and his allies deal with Majin Ozotto, a being who aims to absorb every creature and planet in the universe to gain their power.

== Release ==
In May 2018, V Jump announced a promotional anime for Super Dragon Ball Heroes that would adapt the game's Prison Planet arc. A teaser trailer for the first episode was released on June 21, 2018, and shows the new characters Fu (フュー, Fyū) and Cumber (カンバー, Kanbā), the evil Saiyan. The first episode was shown at Aeon Lake Town, a shopping mall in Koshigaya, Saitama, on July 1, 2018, and was uploaded to the game's official website that same day. Likewise, the second episode was shown at Jump Victory Carnival Tokyo Kaijō on July 16, 2018, before being uploaded to the website. The final episode was released on August 8, 2024. Each episode lasts for around eight to ten minutes.

== Reception ==
According to Comicbook.com, initial reactions to the series from Dragon Ball fans base were mixed, with it being both positively and negatively compared to fan-fiction. Screen Rant referred to a transformation obtained by Vegeta as 'one of Dragon Ball's worst ideas' and negatively compared it to the more positively regarded Majin Vegeta sequence from Dragon Ball Z. Additionally, Marcel Green wrote that Dragon Ball Heroes is "exactly what the harshest critics think all of Dragon Ball is." The heavy focus on flashy powerups, battles, and villains without much of a narrative behind them, was considered as a huge mistake. The animation in the 'Meteor Mission' saga was also criticized as being far inferior to Dragon Ball Super.
