= Dragon Ball Z: For Kinect =

2012 video game

- European cover art
- Developer: Spike Chunsoft
- Publisher: Namco Bandai Games (Note: Released under the Bandai brand name.)
- Director: Kazunori Hanashima
- Designer: Tatsuya Marutani
- Series: Dragon Ball
- Engine: Ultimate Tenkaichi
- Platform: Xbox 360
- Release: AU: October 4, 2012; EU: October 5, 2012; NA: October 9, 2012
- Genre: Fighting
- Mode: Single-player

Dragon Ball Z: For Kinect is a video game based on the anime series Dragon Ball Z for the Xbox 360's Kinect. Published by Namco Bandai Games under the Bandai label and developed by Spike Chunsoft, the game was released in October 2012. It is one of the few Dragon Ball games that never saw a release in Japan, although it still features a Japanese speech track available for international players.

== Overview ==
Dragon Ball Z: For Kinect is a first-person fighting game similar to the arcade game Dragon Ball Z: V.R.V.S. with graphics similar to Dragon Ball Z: Ultimate Tenkaichi, with the later game serving as the basis.

The game has over 50 characters, including one character exclusive to the game: Super Saiyan Bardock, and over 100 moves to perform. There are over 20 special cards with QR codes that can be scanned via the Kinect for additional content (characters and power ups). Those QR cards are offered as preorder incentives, promotions, or in the press. Cardboard Super Saiyan Goku hair has been included in each copy of the game which players can wear, with the back of the hair printed with QR codes.

== Modes ==
=== Story Mode ===
The Story Mode allows the player to follow the sagas of Dragon Ball Z from a first-person perspective for the first time on a console. It covers the main battles of the Saiyan Saga (including the battle against Great Ape Vegeta), Frieza Saga, Cell Saga, and Majin Buu Saga.

== Gameplay ==
During battles, the player retains control only over limited movement and dodging technique. Returned by "spectacular camera movements in an anime style", the fighting system requires the player to carry their body with every movement and every shot so that the character executes them on the screen. It results in a true fusion of "breathtaking cinematic and immerse gameplay".

== Reception ==
Reception

Aggregate score
Aggregator	Score
Metacritic	49/100

Review scores
Publication	Score
Computer Games Magazine	4/10
Destructoid	4.5/10
GameRevolution	4/10
GameSpot	2/5
GamesRadar+	4.5/10
GameTrailers	4.7/10

The game received mostly negative reviews from critics. It has a score of 49% on Metacritic. GameSpot gave the game at a 4.5 out of 10, criticizing the highly repetitive battles, poor story mode, and erratic motion sensing.
