= Playdia =

Fifth-generation home video game console

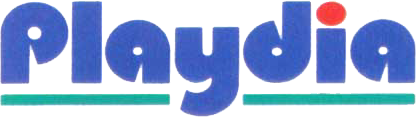

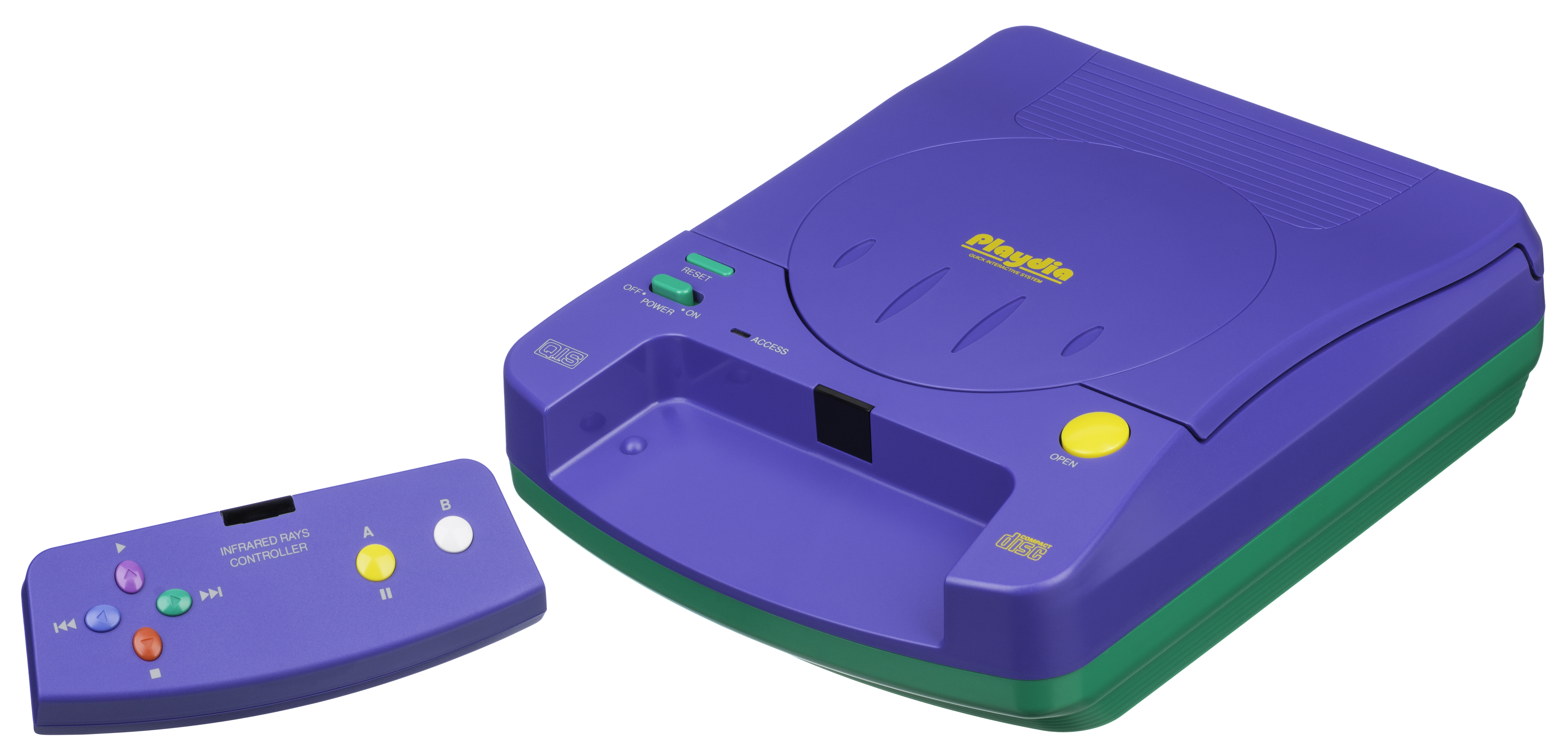
- Manufacturer: Bandai
- Type: Home video game console
- Generation: Fifth generation
- Lifespan: JP: September 23, 1994
- CPU: Toshiba TMP87C800F @8MHz (Z80 derivative); NEC μPD78214GC @12MHz (for image and audio decoding);
- Removable storage: QIS standard CD-ROM
- Display: 248×216 at 16.77 million colors
- Graphics: Asahi Kasei AK8000
- Sound: Asahi Kasei AK8000
- Controller input: Infrared Joypad
- Dimensions: H80 x W210 x D80 mm
- Predecessor: Bandai RX-78; Terebikko
- Successor: Apple Bandai Pippin

The Playdia (プレイディア, Pureidia) (developed under the codename "BA-X") is a fifth-generation home video game console released exclusively in Japan in 1994 at the initial price of ¥24,800. It was intended for a young audience and, like many consoles of the era (such as the LaserActive and the 3DO Interactive Multiplayer), was marketed more as a multimedia home entertainment system than as a dedicated gaming console, with anime quiz software and edutainment making up most of the game library. The Playdia uses a single infrared joypad with simple controls. Bandai, the Playdia's manufacturer, was the only software publisher to support this console (except for VAP who published Ie Naki Ko - Suzu no Sentaku instead of Bandai).

== Overview ==
The Playdia has a CD-ROM drive, and the software is on CD-ROM. The controller has two AAA batteries with infrared wireless that can be stored in the main unit. The target age group was set mainly for elementary school students as both the hardware and software were inexpensive for home games at the time.

The Playdia uses anime full motion video (FMV), being capable of playing back 5 to 10 fps video. Most are interactive learning experiences, but Bandai created a few video games with an interactive component based on its franchise series, including Gundam, Sailor Moon, Ultraman, and Dragon Ball . The FMVs involve little gameplay. As is typical for FMV games, the player directs playback by choosing from menu options. Playdia is the only 8-bit fifth-generation game machine, with its contemporaries having 32-bit and even 64-bit CPUs. The system relied heavily on Bandai's own intellectual property.

On the main body and software package, there is a logo of "QIS" and the notation "This software is dedicated to the QIS standard". QIS is an abbreviation of "Quick Interactive System" and indicates a high-speed access function to CD-ROM. There is no BIOS or menu when the user starts the console without a disc, all that shows is a blue screen.

The Playdia had poor sales, therefore for Bandai, the console was a failure. Bandai discontinued the console in 1996 and the unsold consoles were converted by Bandai subsidiary Banpresto into coin-operated Micha King machines that played anime clips in Japanese arcades and shops. Its successor was Apple Pippin that Bandai co-developed, which was also unsuccessful.

== Playdia software ==
The list below includes 33 retail titles, comprising 28 games and 5 applications, plus six promotional or demonstration disc titles.

=== 1994 ===
- 09/23 - Dragon Ball Z - Shin Saiyajin Zetsumetsu Keikaku Chikyū Hen - [BAPD-01]
- 09/23 - Bishōjo Senshi Sailor Moon S - Quiz Taiketsu! Sailor Power Kesshū!! - [BAPD-02]
- 09/23 - SD Gundam Daizukan - [BAPD-03]
- 09/28 - Ultraman Powered - Kaijū Gekimetsu Sakusen - [BAPD-04]
- 09/28 - Hello Kitty - Yume no Kuni Daibōken - [BAPD-05]
- 11/25 - Aqua Adventure - Blue Lilty - [BAPD-06]
- 11/25 - Newton museum - Kyōryū Nendaiki Zenpen - [BAPD-07]
- 11/25 - Newton museum - Kyōryū Nendaiki Kōhen - [BAPD-08]
- 12/08 - Shuppatsu! Dōbutsu Tankentai - [BAPD-09]
- 12/16 - Ultra Seven - Chikyū Bōei Sakusen - [BAPD-10]
- 12/16 - Dragon Ball Z - Shin Saiyajin Zetsumetsu Keikaku Uchū Hen - [BAPD-11]

=== 1995 ===
- 01/24 - Norimono Banzai!! - Kuruma Daishūgō!! - [BAPD-12]
- 01/24 - Norimono Banzai!! - Densha Daishūgō!! - [BAPD-13]
- 03/22 - Ie Naki Ko - Suzu no Sentaku - [VPRJ-09722]
- 03/22 - Gamera - The Time Adventure - [BAPD-15]
- 06/22 - Elements Voice Series vol.1 Mika Kanai - Wind&Breeze - [BAPD-18]
- 06/22 - Elements Voice Series vol.2 Rica Fukami - Private Step - [BAPD-19]
- 06/22 - Elements Voice Series vol.3 Aya Hisakawa - Forest Sways - [BAPD-20]
- 07/28 - Bishōjo Senshi Sailor Moon SuperS - Sailor Moon to Hiragana Lesson! - [BAPD-21]
- 07/28 - Ultraman - Hiragana Dai Sakusen - [BAPD-22]
- 07/28 - Ultraman - Alphabet TV e Yōkoso - [BAPD-23]
- 08/24 - Bishōjo Senshi Sailor Moon SS - Sailor Moon to Hajimete no Eigo - [BAPD-24]
- 08/24 - Bishōjo Senshi Sailor Moon SS - Yōkoso! Sailor Yōchien - [BAPD-25]
- 08/24 - Ultraman - Oide yo! Ultra Yōchien - [BAPD-26]
- 10/20 - Chōgōkin Selections - [BKPD-01]
- 11/16 - Elements Voice Series vol.4 Yuri Shiratori - Rainbow Harmony - [BKPD-02]
- 12/15 - Soreike! Anpanman - Picnic de Obenkyō - [BAPD-27]

=== 1996 ===
- 03/22 - Ultraman - Sūji de Asobō Ultra Land - [BAPD-28]
- 03/22 - Ultraman - Ultraman Chinō UP Dai Sakusen - [BAPD-29]
- 03/27 - Elements Voice Series vol.5 Mariko Kouda - Welcome to the Marikotown! - [BKPD-03]
- 04/24 - Nintama Rantarō - Gungun Nobiru Chinō Hen - [BKPD-04]
- 05/15 - Nintama Rantarō - Hajimete Oboeru Chishiki Hen - [BKPD-05]
- 06/26 - Gekisou Sentai Carranger - Tatakae! Hiragana Racer - [BKPD-06]

=== Not for sale ===
- Yumi to Tokoton Playdia - [BS-003]
- Go! Go! Ackman Planet - [BS-005]
- Jamp Gentei Special - 4 Dai Hero Battle Taizen - [BS-006]
- Bandai Item Collection 70 - [BS-007]
- Playdia IQ Kids - [BS-009]
- Kero Kero Keroppi - Uki Uki Party Land - [BS-010]

== Hardware ==
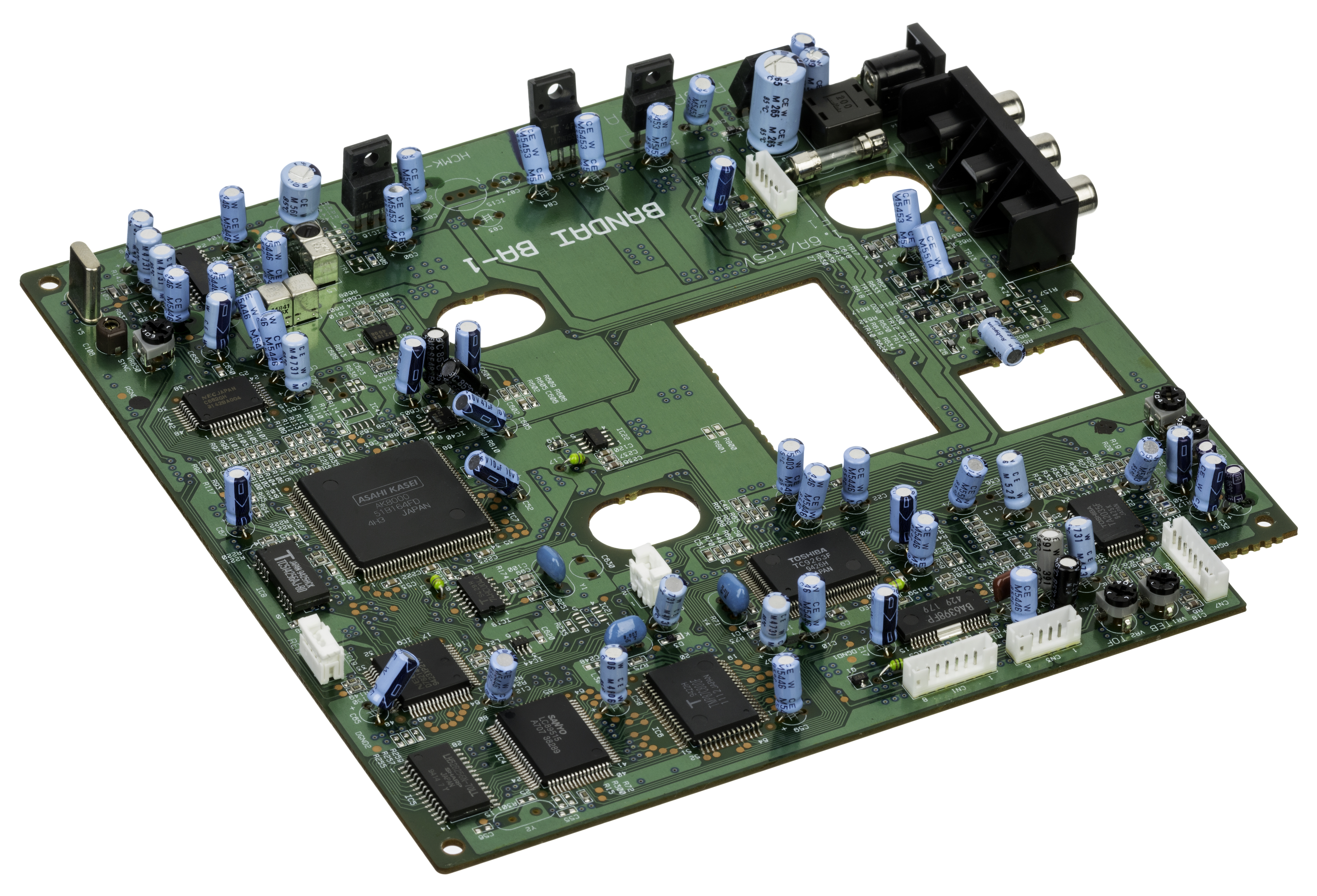
The Bandai Playdia motherboard

- Sanyo Lc89515 - CD-ROM Host Interface
- Toshiba TA2035F - CD Focus tracking server
- Toshiba tc9263f - CD Single Chip processor
- Rohm 6398FP - 4 Channel BTL Driver for CD Player motor
- Toshiba TMP87C800F - 8 Bit Microcontroller (8 kb ROM, 16 kb RAM) - 8 MHz Operation, can access 64 kb (TLCS-870 series which is based heavily on the Z80)
- Sharp LH52B256 - 256 kb (32K x 8) Static RAM chip
- NEC μPD78214GC - 8 Bit Microcontroller (16 kb ROM, 512 byte RAM) - 12 MHz Operation, can access 1 mb (NEC 78K series)
- Toshiba TC514256JAJ - 256K Word x 4 Fast Page DRAM Chip
- Asahi Kasei AK8000 - Audio / Video processor, 248×216 pixel, true color
- Philips DA8772AH - Triple 8 bit DAC converter
- Sony CX1229M - NTSC/PAL Decoder
- Rohm BA10324AF - Quad Op Amp
- Sanyo LC78835K - 18BIT DAC with filter
- Rohm BU3052BCF - Dual 4 Channel Analogue Multiplexer
