= Vegeta =

Fictional character from Dragon Ball

- Dragon Ball character
- Vegeta, as drawn by Akira Toriyama
- First appearance: Dragon Ball chapter #204 Sayonara, Son Goku, January 7, 1989 (Weekly Shōnen Jump 1989)
- Created by: Akira Toriyama
- Voiced by: Japanese: Ryō Horikawa; Yūdai Mino (Mini; Dragon Ball Daima); English: Christopher Sabat (Funimation/Crunchyroll); Brian Drummond (Ocean); Paul Castro Jr. (Mini; Dragon Ball Daima)

In-universe information
- Full name: Prince Vegeta IV
- Species: Saiyan
- Title: Prince of all Saiyans
- Family: King Vegeta III (father); Tarble (brother)
- Spouse: Bulma (wife)
- Children: Trunks (son); Bulla (daughter)
- Relatives: Vegeta II (paternal grandfather); Vegeta I (great-grandfather); Tights (sister-in-law); Gure (sister-in-law)
- Abilities: Superhuman strength, speed, agility, reflexes, durability, endurance, stamina and healing, flight, energy sensing, energy projection, energy absorption, telepathy, telekinesis, teleportation, forced unfusion

Vegeta (Japanese: ベジータ, Hepburn: Bejīta) (/vəˈdʒiːtə/ və-JEE-tə), fully referred to as Prince Vegeta IV (ベジータ王子四世, Bejīta-ōji Yon-sei), is a fictional character in the Japanese franchise Dragon Ball created by Akira Toriyama. Vegeta made his appearance in chapter #204 "Sayonara, Son Goku", published in Weekly Shōnen Jump magazine on January 7, 1989, seeking the wish-granting Dragon Balls to achieve immortality.

As the first major antagonist of Dragon Ball Z, Vegeta is the prince of an elite extraterrestrial warrior race known as the Saiyans. As a person, he is naturally blunt, regal, hard-working, and is full of his Saiyan pride; he often refers to his heritage and royal status throughout the series, but can also have negative traits such as being extremely haughty, along with a destructive temper. He believed that he should be regarded as the strongest fighter in the universe, and becomes obsessed with surpassing Son Goku after losing his battle with the Z fighters. However, after Frieza's death, Vegeta unites with the heroes to thwart greater threats to the universe, most notably Cell, Majin Buu, Gomah, Beerus, Zamasu, Hit, Jiren, Broly, Moro, Granolah, and Gas. Throughout the series, Vegeta's role changes from villain to hero, though he remains a key rival of Goku.

Vegeta has been hailed as one of the most iconic characters not only in the Dragon Ball franchise, but also in manga and anime history as a whole. He is often cited as one of the most popular examples of rival characters in the industry, due to his character arc and narrative throughout Dragon Ball Z and Dragon Ball Super.

== Development ==
Akira Toriyama explained his surprise at the character's popularity in an interview during the release of Dragon Ball Z: Battle of Gods, "I had thought about bringing an end to [his story] as just a villain, but as I was writing, I felt that his villainous ... warped straightforwardness was unexpectedly interesting. I couldn't imagine that a guy with this kind of hairstyle would become popular, and yet he'd get more votes than Goku in favorite-character polls."

Toriyama initially harbored a dislike for Vegeta since he was created as a despicable character, but grew to like him as he considered the character's personality to be straightforward, therefore easier to write. He also found the character "Extremely helpful to have around". He stated at one point when he received a lot of fan mail telling him not to kill Vegeta, he purposely did just that. Toriyama later named Vegeta alongside Piccolo as one of his favourite warriors in Dragon Ball, he stated he liked how they don't say anything until they want to, they have a sense of aloof superiority and that they're cool. After the release of Battle of Gods, Toriyama expressed interest in having Vegeta be the lead in the event of another animated feature, though he insisted this was only his intent and no decision had been made.

Following the trend that names of members of the Saiyan race are puns on vegetables, Vegeta's name is a pun on the word vegetable itself.

=== Voice actors ===
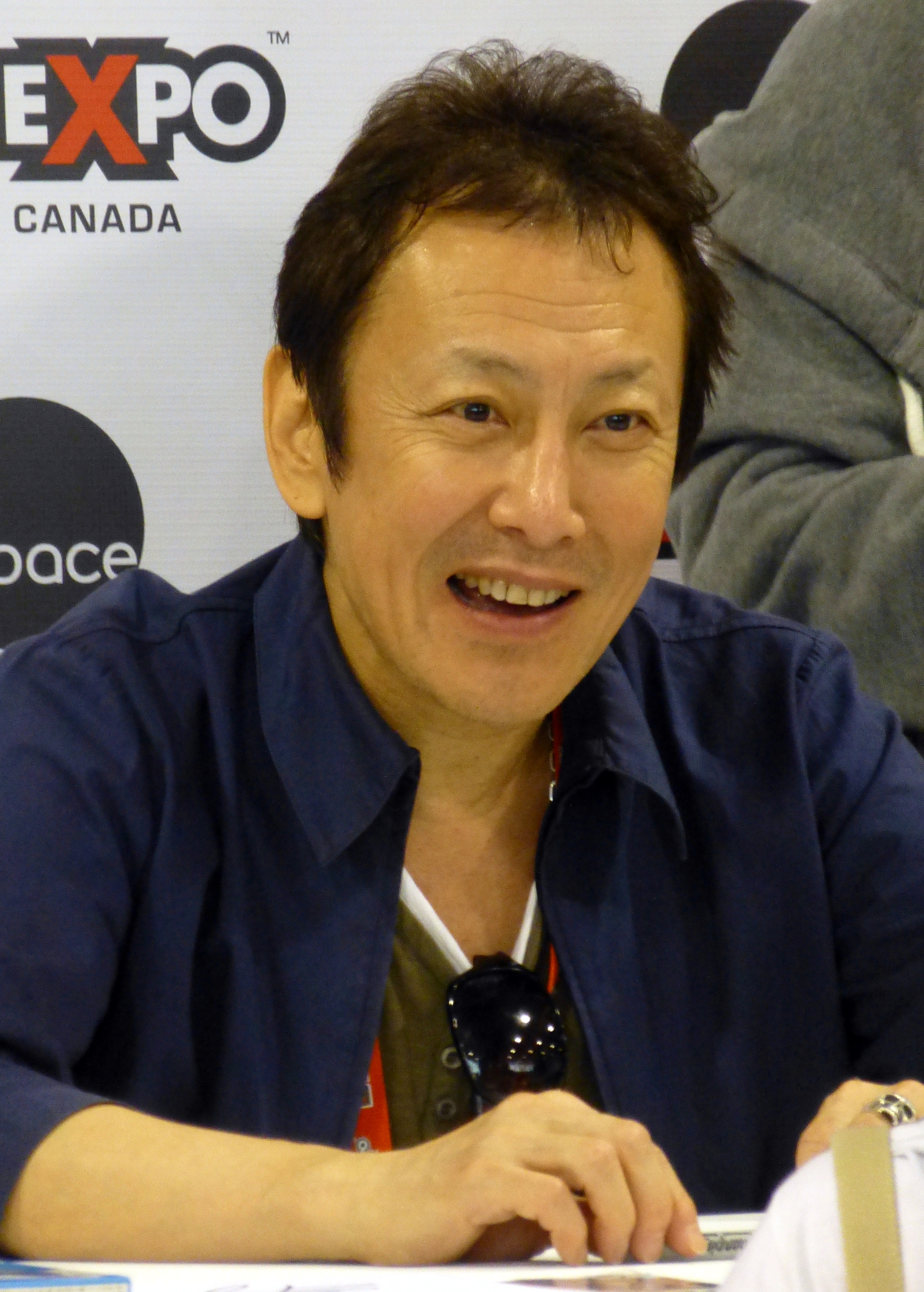
Ryō Horikawa has been Vegeta's Japanese voice actor in most pieces of Dragon Ball media.

In the original Japanese version of the anime and all media, Vegeta is voiced by Ryō Horikawa, with the only exception being Dragon Ball Daima, where a mini Vegeta was voiced by Yūdai Mino.

In the Ocean Productions English dub, Vegeta was voiced by Brian Drummond. Drummond returned in the Funimation dub of Dragon Ball Super to voice Vegeta's Duplicate.

In Funimation (now Crunchyroll)'s in-house dub, Christopher Sabat has voiced Vegeta in all Dragon Ball media, including video games. While Sabat continued to dub Vegeta's adult incarnation in Dragon Ball Z Kai, exceptions include Laura Bailey, who voiced Vegeta's child incarnation in Dragon Ball Z Kai, Justin Briner voiced Vegeta's child incarnation in Dragon Ball Super and Paul Castro Jr. played mini Vegeta in Dragon Ball Daima

In Brazil, where Dragon Ball is a huge success, Vegeta has been voiced by Alfredo Rollo since his debut. In Latin American Spanish, he's consistently been voiced by René García.

== Appearances ==
=== Dragon Ball Z ===
Vegeta is introduced as a member of the Saiyan (サイヤ人, Saiya-jin) race. He travels to Earth with his partner Nappa to use the Dragon Balls to wish for immortality. Nappa easily fights off Earth's heroes and kills Tien Shinhan, Chiaotzu, Yamcha, and Piccolo in the process. Goku then arrives after completing his training with Kaiō-sama. Goku easily defeats Nappa, who is then killed by Vegeta, for the shame of being defeated by a low-class Saiyan such as Goku. Vegeta fights Goku and is severely beaten by Goku's Kaioken technique, forcing him to resort to his Ozaru form to overpower Goku, the first time he has ever transformed in single combat, but he is unable to beat the rest of the heroes due to his sustained injuries from Goku, Gohan, Krillin and Yajirobe. Exhausted and on the brink of death, he barely escapes with his life and is further humiliated by the fact that Goku pleaded with Krillin to spare his life.

Vegeta then travels to planet Namek in an attempt to wish for immortality using that planet's Dragon Balls, Earth's Dragon Balls having ceased to exist following Piccolo's death, cutting the tyrant Frieza off from making the same wish in the process. Upon arrival, Vegeta manages to kill many of Frieza's henchmen and also mercilessly destroys a defenseless Namekian village for their Dragon Ball. Later on, Vegeta is forced to team up with Gohan, Goku, Piccolo, and Krillin so they can fight off the Ginyu Force and later Frieza. He also kills most members of the Ginyu Force after Goku weakens them. Ultimately, Frieza beats him severely and mortally wounds him; as he dies, he begs Goku to avenge him and all the other Saiyans whom he was their prince. Vegeta is later unintentionally revived with a wish to revive all of Frieza's victims from the Dragon Balls from Earth, and is subsequently sent to Earth with another wish so that he will survive Namek's impending explosion. Vegeta later learns that Goku defeated Frieza and managed to flee Namek in time.

Vegeta's first few appearances in the anime depicted him with a radically different color scheme.

After Frieza's final defeat, Vegeta chooses to stay on Earth to await Goku's return and has a son named Trunks with Bulma. Three years later, Vegeta finally becomes a Super Saiyan and easily destroys Android 19, sent by Dr. Gero to kill Goku. However, even as a Super Saiyan, he is easily defeated by Android 18. Afterwards, Vegeta ascends beyond the Super Saiyan level while training with Future Trunks, a version of his son from an alternate timeline, in the Room of Spirit and Time (精神と時の部屋) and pummels the artificial life form Cell after he has absorbed Android 17. Vegeta's overconfidence leads him to allow Cell to absorb Android 18, upon which Cell achieves his third "perfect" form. After Vegeta fails to defeat Perfect Cell, he is forced to participate in Cell's martial arts tournament known as the Cell Games, in which he makes a crucial intervention so Gohan can overpower and defeat Cell in his Super Perfect form.

Seven years later, Vegeta allows himself to be consumed by Babidi's evil power for his own desire to become powerful enough to fight and defeat Goku. The M on Vegeta's forehead stands for Majin. It is a seal put by Babidi to indicate that he controls Vegeta in a certain way. It was placed through black magic. He knew that he was powerful enough to resist mind control. He then goes on an indiscriminate killing spree to provoke Goku to fight him. However, when the monster Majin Buu is revived as a result of the energy released from their fight, Vegeta knocks out Goku from behind after deceiving Goku by feigning a truce. Vegeta then faces Majin Buu alone and ends up sacrificing himself in an attempt to defeat Buu, dedicating his sacrifice to Bulma, Trunks, and Goku. With all other fighters dead or absorbed, Vegeta is allowed to recover his body and returns to Earth to help Goku, the last warrior remaining, against the threat of Buu. He reluctantly combines bodies with Goku using the Potara earrings, to create the fused warrior Vegito, who completely overwhelms Buu with his strength. Eventually, Vegito allows himself to be absorbed into Buu's body to free the other heroes absorbed by Buu, but this leads to the splitting of the fusion. Goku and Vegeta manage to free their allies who have been absorbed by Buu, causing him to undergo a final transformation, which results in his return to his original Kid Buu form. On the Kaiō-shin's planet, after getting revived once more thanks to the Namekian Dragon Balls, Vegeta battles Buu again to buy time for Goku to gather energy for the Genki Dama, which he uses to defeat Majin Buu once and for all. It is during this fight that Vegeta finally admits Goku as both his superior and friend.

Ten years later, at the next World Martial Arts Tournament, Vegeta is among those who witness Goku's battle with Buu's human reincarnation, Uub, and later bids Goku farewell as Goku departs with Uub to his village to train him as his successor.

=== Dragon Ball Super ===
In Dragon Ball Z: Battle of Gods, Vegeta tries to appease Beerus so that he will not destroy the Earth and briefly surpasses Goku because of a power boost induced by rage by Beerus slapping Bulma; he then later participates in a ritual to transform Goku into a Super Saiyan god and watches him fight the god of destruction, and in Dragon Ball Z: Resurrection 'F', Vegeta trains off planet with Whis and returns to Earth to combat the resurrected Frieza, being killed by him when he destroys the Earth, which is reversed by Whis, allowing Goku in the nick of time to finish the tyrant off with a Kamehameha wave, in which Vegeta moves out of range.

After the latter two films and anime adaptation in Dragon Ball Super, Vegeta participates in a tournament where he defeats Frost, Magetta, and Cabba, but is defeated by the assassin Hit. He travels to Planet Potaufeu to retrieve Goten and Trunks, where he fights a copy of himself created by Commeson. He is then reunited with Future Trunks and begins training to fight the evil Goku Black, also training Trunks for the fight. Vegeta travels to the future to counter Goku Black, but is defeated and returns to the past. Vegeta heals and returns to the future for a rematch. Failing to defeat Goku Black before traveling to the present, where he trains, giving him enough strength to best Goku Black in their next encounter. Vegeta and Goku then meet their match against Zamasu's fused form, forcing them to once again fuse into Vegito, who defuses from overusing his energy. Vegeta later aids Trunks in defeating Zamasu. Vegeta loses a battle to Arale, and later declines training with Goku due to Bulma's pregnancy. When his daughter, Bulla, is born, Vegeta develops a strong attachment to her and becomes very protective of her well-being.

Vegeta decides to enter the Tournament of Power to protect his family. During the tournament, Vegeta successfully knocks out numerous fighters. He knocks out Toppo, who achieved the power of a God of Destruction, and then aids Goku in fighting the last remaining member of Universe 11, Jiren. It is during his fight with Jiren and Toppo that Vegeta breaks his limits. With two minutes remaining in the tournament, Jiren knocks Vegeta out, who then tearfully sends the last of his remaining power to Goku. In the film Dragon Ball Super: Broly, Vegeta and Goku battle Frieza's newest recruit, the Saiyan Broly, but he proves too powerful for either of them. Left with no other options, Vegeta learns the fusion dance and fuses with Goku, becoming Gogeta and stopping Broly's rampage. After these events, Vegeta and Goku had been recruited by the Galactic Patrol to stop the wicked warlock Moro, who escaped along with his comrades. They confront and fail to defeat him, suffering wounds from the battle. Vegeta resolves to go to Yardrat to train and obtain a means to stop Moro. Returning after having used Shunkan Ido, Vegeta takes away Moro's stolen life energy and revives the victims of Namek in an act of redemption using a new technique. He maintains the upper hand, savagely beating the warlock until the tide turns against his favour when Moro absorbs one of his comrades to bolster his power, beating Vegeta into unconsciousness. When Moro starts absorbing the Earth's energy after having merged with it, a healed up Vegeta arrives just in time to aid Goku by not only fissioning the energy out of him to prevent him from hiding his weakpoint, but also by personally gathering the necessary energy from the other Dragon Team members and Oob to send it to Goku for him to channel his Ultra Instinct powers one more time and kill Moro (while saving the planet) for good.

Later on, Vegeta and Goku were invited by the alien beings called the Heeters to defeat the powerful Cerealean sniper named Granolah. He engages Granolah in battle after he defeats Goku in his Ultra Instinct state, and gains the upper-hand using the power of Destroyer Gods in a new form he labels Ultra Ego, in opposition to his rival's Ultra Instinct, that he achieved during training with Beerus, but is beaten in turn after Granolah unleashes his true power. After the Namekian, Monaito, intervenes, he confirms to Goku about the identity of his father, Bardock. After the Heeter, Gas, shows up to settle a grudge on the Cerealean, Vegeta, in a show of stubborn pride, gives Granolah a senzu bean so he can fight Gas. Later, he and Goku struggle against the powerful Heeter and are beaten, but are saved at the last moment by the unexpected arrival of Frieza, who proceeds to murder Gas and Elec for their betrayal. He beats Vegeta and Goku down in one blow upon unveiling his new powers, but ultimately spares them.

In Dragon Ball Super: Super Hero, Vegeta trains with Goku and Broly on Beerus' planet, where he attempts to learn the ways Jiren uses to efficiently use his power. He spars with Goku without transformations or energy attacks. He is unable to get in contact because of Beerus' ice cream cup obstructing Whis' staff, leaving the situation on Earth to be handled by Piccolo and whoever he can enlist. In the post-credits scene, exhausted, Vegeta lands the last blow on Goku, triumphantly declaring himself the winner, much to the boredom of Cheelai and comically moved emotion from Broly and Lemo.

=== In other media ===
In filler episodes of Dragon Ball Z, set during the Saiyan arc, Vegeta and Nappa travel to Arlia while in space, being hailed as heroes after saving the people there. After leaving, Vegeta destroys the planet from space. After the Namek arc, Vegeta travels across space in an ultimately unsuccessful attempt at finding Goku, defeating remnants of Frieza's army. After the Buu arc, Vegeta attends a gathering with the other heroes.

In addition, Vegeta appears in six of the non-canonical Dragon Ball Z movies; in the sixth, Vegeta comes to Goku's aid against Meta-Cooler, foiling his attempt at powering the Big Gete Star with their energy by overloading it; in the seventh, Vegeta appears to aid the others in combating a new wave of androids, destroying Android 15; in the eighth, Vegeta shows hesitation in fighting Broly due to his immense strength in his true form, though he overcomes it in time to supply Goku with his energy, contributing to Broly's defeat; in the ninth, Vegeta withdraws from attending a tournament, disillusioned by Goku's death, but comes to help Trunks when believing he is in danger; in the twelfth, after having a difficult time with Janemba, Vegeta fuses with Goku to form Gogeta who destroys Janemba easily; in the thirteenth, Vegeta fights Hirudegarn after he steps on his home;

In the anime sequel Dragon Ball GT, Vegeta is confronted by a Baby-possessed Gohan. Baby possessed Vegeta during their battle despite strong resistance by Vegeta, and the resulting Baby/Vegeta fusion battles Goku. Vegeta is later split from Baby's body before Baby is destroyed. Later, he fights Super Android #17, but again, he is knocked out and nearly killed. When Omega Shenron wreaks havoc, he fights with Goku as a Super Saiyan 4, but the two eventually revert to normal. Afterwards, Vegeta says a farewell to Goku, who leaves the duty of protecting Earth in Vegeta's hands before he flies off into the sky on Shenron.

Vegeta has appeared in many video games related to the Dragon Ball franchise as both a playable character and boss. In several games, Vegeta is capable of transforming into a Super Saiyan 3, first introduced in Dragon Ball Z: Raging Blast. In the 2003 game Dragon Ball Z: Budokai 2, Vegeta can be absorbed by Boo as one of the alternate forms exclusive to the game. In the 2010 arcade game Dragon Ball: Heroes, Vegeta bests Super 17 before and after he merges with Android 18. A Time Breaker-possessed version of Vegeta also appears in the game. In the 2015 game Dragon Ball: Xenoverse, Vegeta serves as a mentor to the player character, teaching Galic Gun, Final Barrage, Shine Shot, and Final Flash. He has also appeared in other non Dragon Ball-related video games, such as Jump Super Stars, Jump Ultimate Stars, and even in the Dragon Ball Z/One Piece/Naruto crossover game Battle Stadium D.O.N.

Vegeta has made several appearances in other manga, one of which is in Akira Toriyama's Dragon Ball self-parody Neko Majin, where he battles the titular character. In the Dragon Ball and One Piece crossover, Cross Epoch, Vegeta is re-imagined as a captain of a crew of air pirates which includes Trunks, Usopp, and Nico Robin. On September 15, 2006, Vegeta made a guest appearance in a chapter of the Kochira Katsushika-ku Kameari Kōen-mae Hashutsujo manga, Super Kochikame, entitled Kochira Namek-Sei Dragon Kōen-mae Hashutsujo (こちらナメック星ドラゴン公園前派出所; This is the Dragon Police Station in front of the Park on Planet Namek). Vegeta appears in the Karate Shōkōshi Kohinata Minoru manga in Chapter 178. Two characters go to a restaurant that features live Muay Thai boxing, and Vegeta is in the background cheering. He also makes a single-panel appearance in Toriyama's 2014 Dragon Ball Minus: The Departure of the Fated Child special. He is also had an appearance in the newest Dragon Ball Super and Dragon Ball Heroes.

Vegeta has also been the victim of parody: the Weekly Shōnen Jump Gag Special 2005 issue released on November 12, 2004, featured a Bobobo-bo Bo-bobo one-shot Dragon Ball parody manga. The manga was a humorous retelling of the battle between Goku and Vegeta initial battle; Jelly Jiggler was Goku and Don Patch was Vegeta.

Vegeta has made two contributions to music: in the eighth installment of Hit Song Collection series entitled Character Special 2, Vegeta sings the song "Vegeta-sama no Oryori Jigoku!!". The song focuses of Vegeta cooking a special Okonomiyaki, and in Dragon Ball Kai: Song Collection he sings the song "Saiyan Blood", which he brags about how great he is. Other Dragon Ball-related songs that center around Vegeta are "Koi no Nazonazo" by Kuko and Tricky Shirai which focuses on his and Bulma's relationship and "Ai wa Ballad no Yō ni~Vegeta no Theme~" by Shin Oya which represents Vegeta's reflections on his life and then current family.

== Abilities ==
Up until his tail was cut off, Vegeta could turn into a gigantic monkey-like creature called an Ōzaru (大猿; lit. "Great Ape") by looking at a full moon, an ability common of all Saiyans with tails. Vegeta can create and enhance attacks with the use of ki. He also can use Bukū-jutsu (舞空術; lit: "Air Dancing Technique"), which enables him to fly. Constant training and his Saiyan heritage have given him vast superhuman strength, durability, speed, and reflexes. Vegeta can increase his physical capabilities and flight speed manyfold if he directs ki into them.

Vegeta is known to give names to his various energy attacks. In his early appearance, Vegeta is seen to use attacks similar to several of the protagonists of the series, such as a Destructo Disc (気円斬, Kienzan; lit. Ki Disk Razor), a laser-like disk capable of cutting through solid objects, and a ki wave similar to Goku's Kamehameha. One of his better known attacks is the Galick Gun (ギャリック砲, Gyarikku Hō), although he uses it only once in the Z series proper; during his battle against Goku in an attempt to destroy the Earth. He later develops the Big Bang Attack (ビッグ・バン・アタック, Biggu Ban Atakku) and the Final Flash (ファイナルフラッシュ, Fainaru Furasshu) techniques, which are much more powerful than his older energy attacks. One of Vegeta's most commonly used tactics in the series is when he bombards an opponent with an array of small ki blasts. He is not known to have an official name for this attack, but it is occasionally called Rapid-Fire Energy Balls (連続エネルギー弾, Renzoku Enerugī Dan). Later on in the franchise, he develops an even more powerful version of his Final Flash attack, called Gamma Burst Flash (ガンマバーストフラッシュ, Ganma Bāsuto Furasshu). In Dragon Ball GT, Vegeta displays a powerful new attack, entitling it the Final Shine Attack (ファイナルシャインアタック, Fainaru Shain Atakku), where he uses his left hand to fire off a massive beam of green ki that widens with distance. Because of his immense strength and power, Vegeta, along with many other characters from the Dragon Ball franchise, can destroy entire planets if not star systems, galaxies and even entire Universes with single attacks if he intends to.

Vegeta also possesses several transformations that greatly enhance his abilities to varying degrees. Though he lost his Great Ape form, he gains the ability to transform into a Super Saiyan and, through training, can further transform into advanced states of Super Saiyan as the series continues. Vegeta later achieved the immensely powerful Super Saiyan God Super Saiyan (超サイヤ人ゴッドSS（スーパーサイヤ人ゴッドスーパーサイヤ人）, Sūpā Saiya-jin Goddo Sūpā Saiya-jin), "Super Saiyan Blue" for short, under Whis's tutelage. It is later revealed that he now has access to the red-haired Super Saiyan God (超スーパーサイヤ人じんゴッド, Sūpā Saiya-jin Goddo) form, originally obtained by Goku, most notably during his fight against Broly.

During his fight with Jiren, a mortal stronger than a destroyer, Vegeta unlocks an enhanced version of the Super Saiyan Blue form, evolving his transformation by breaking his limits.

In Dragon Ball DAIMA, which takes place before "Super", Vegeta is shown to be able to use Super Saiyan 3, but it elevates the strain on his energy that is a consequence of pushing his limits. Humorously, Vegeta argues that it's a new form called "Ultra Vegeta One."

During the "Granolah the Survivor" arc of the manga, Vegeta trains under Beerus to master the God of Destruction's power of Hakai (破壊; lit: "destruction"). This training eventually culminates in Vegeta acquiring a form that he labels Ultra Ego (我儘わがままの極意ごくい, Wagamama no Goku'i; lit. 'Secret of self-indulgence'), elevating him to be as powerful as Goku's completed Ultra Instinct. The Ultra Ego state allows Vegeta to become more powerful as he takes more damage.

Vegeta can also fuse with Goku and create a warrior who has the combined power and skills of both. One method is by using the Potara earrings, presented to Goku by the Old Kaiō-shin. This results in a 'potara fusion' creating Vegito (ベジット, Bejitto; "Vegerot" in Viz Media's manga translation), who, in his reappearance in Dragon Ball Super, can also transform into a Super Saiyan God Super Saiyan. The other method is by performing the 'Metamorese Fusion Dance', which creates Gogeta (ゴジータ, Gojīta).

== Reception ==
Cosplayer portraying Vegeta's appearance when he is under the influence of Babidi

Vegeta has generally received praise from various reviewers of manga, anime, and other media. Theron noted Vegeta's overcoming his pride to help defeat Cell as the best scene from the fight against said antagonist due to how it creates the climax of the scene. Carlos Ross from Them Anime Reviews found Vegeta and Bulma's relationship to have too much comic potential and comments that such characterization was lost. Japanese voice actor Tōru Furuya expressed shock Trunks was Bulma's and Vegeta's child from the future even though Yamcha and Bulma were often in a relationship and Yamcha was turned into a cheater to cause such change. Hiromi Tsuru, Bulma's original Japanese actress, was also shocked by this change, believing her character would end with Yamcha. Bulma's voice actress joked that it was difficult for her to love Vegeta, having thought Bulma would end up with Yamcha. Mania Entertainment writer Briana Lawerence listed Vegeta 9th in the article 10 Male Headaches of Anime, criticizing his personality and his repeated desire to surpass Goku's power. Vegeta is a popular character in the series, placing fourth in the 1993 Dragon Ball character popularity poll voted on by Weekly Shōnen Jump readers, and moved up to second in the 1995 one. In 2004, fans of the series voted him the second most popular character for a poll in the book Dragon Ball Forever.

There was also commentary about Vegeta's betrayal in the final arc of Dragon Ball Z. Theron Martin from Anime News Network noted Vegeta's pride as being partially responsible for the success of the series. His fight against Goku during the final story arc was also commented to be very entertaining, despite its length as well as Goku and Vegeta's fighting styles, which Martin considered to have become stale. Todd Douglass Jr. from DVD Talk commented on Vegeta's skills and anger, noting them to be a good combination for any fight even though it is a one-sided battle due to how powerful he is. Douglass called his reveal as a villain during the appearance of Babidi, "the real meat" of the story. Both Goku and Vegeta were criticized for being too overpowered in Super to the point they steal the series' spotlight to the supporting cast while their strategies either lack complexity or create a plothole such as the time limit to the fusion Vegetto.

Vegeta has appeared in the Anime Grand Prix poll taking high places in the category "best male character" in the 1991 poll and 1992 poll. Vegeta was placed twenty-first in IGN's 2009 top anime character of all-time list, calling him "the original unmitigated bastard" that preceded Light Yagami and Lelouch Lamperouge, and in the tenth spot in 2014. Vegeta came third on IGN's 2014 Top 10 Anime Villains list, stating, "The most famous bad-guy-turned-not-so-bad in all of anime. Vegeta started out as an alien punk with a sadistic streak and an inferiority complex, but over time, he became one of Goku's friends, and every now and then, if he was feeling nice that day, he'd help save the world." A Biglobe poll conducted in 2012 listed Vegeta at number 16 of Japanese fans' favorite tsundere characters, the highest among male characters on that list, and a Thai magazine about anime characters also listed him among male tsunderes.

A poll by Viz Media, editor responsible for the publication of the series in North America and Europe, confirms that Vegeta is the most popular character in Dragon Ball Super.

== Cultural impact ==
Vegeta's quote "It's Over 9000!" has become an internet meme and a popular catchphrase referring to a large number or great quantity. The line originates from the 21st episode of the Ocean Productions English dub, "The Return of Goku", where Brian Drummond voices Vegeta.

The costume worn by the antagonist Erik Killmonger in the 2018 film Black Panther is strikingly similar to Vegeta's costume. Killmonger is portrayed by Michael B. Jordan, who is known to be a fan of Dragon Ball. Jordan said Killmonger's battle armor may have been inspired by Vegeta's battle armor.

=== Professional sports ===
American UFC fighter Marcus Brimage is an avid fan of Dragon Ball Z, even citing the series as one of his inspirations for taking up mixed-martial arts. He names the first fight between Goku and Vegeta as one of his favorite battles in the series. American athlete Ronda Rousey wore a singlet referencing Vegeta and the 'It's Over 9000!' meme at Wrestlemania 31. Boca Juniors player Eduardo Salvio often celebrates his goals with a Dragon Ball Z reference, including Vegeta's Final Flash attack.

=== Music ===
American rapper Soulja Boy has two songs, titled "Anime" and "Goku", which reference Vegeta in the lyrics.

In the song entitled "Christ Conscious" by Joey Badass, the song's lyrics include the following line: Got dragon balls, like my name was Vegeta.

The demo version of the song 'T & C' from "First Impressions" by Thrice has a sample of Vegeta in the intro from the original Ocean dub: No way! How? It can't be! Kakarot, a Super Saiyan? But he's a low-class soldier, it doesn't make any sense!

The third album released by the musical-comedy group Starbomb features a song titled "Vegeta's Serenade". The song centers around Vegeta trying to write a love song for Bulma, but keeps getting distracted by his hatred for Goku.

== See also ==
- List of Dragon Ball characters
