= 2024 in Japanese television =

Below is a non-comprehensive list of events associated with and affecting Japanese television in 2024.

== Events ==
Date	Event	Source
January 3	Fairy Tail voice actress Aya Hirano announces her marriage to Kamen Rider Amazons actor Masashi Taniguchi.	
January 25	Shinji Aoba is sentenced to death for the 2019 Kyoto Animation arson attack after he was found guilty on September 5, 2023.	
March 9	Kamen Rider W actor Masaki Suda announced the birth of his first child with To Give a Dream actress Nana Komatsu.	
March 30	The 2023–24 Formula E World Championship was held at 2024 Tokyo ePrix.	
April 1	During April Fool's Day, it was announced in commemoration with the original anime series' 20th anniversary that a new Sgt. Frog anime series is in the works.	
April 7	The 2024 Formula One World Championship was held at 2024 Japanese Grand Prix.	
June 25	A new anime adaptation project for the Magic Knight Rayearth franchise has been announced.	
July 26–11 August	The 2024 Summer Olympics was held in Paris, France.	
August 28 - September 8	The 2024 Summer Paralympics was held in Paris, France.	
September 4	As announced, Tokyo MX will add a new programing block as well as schedule changes for its other anime timeslots, such as moving and expanding its weekday "Kids' Anime" timeslot from 6:30 p.m. to 7:00-8:57 p.m., starting in October.	
September 30	As revealed in a press conference in Tokyo, Nippon Television has announced that an April 2025 live action television project will be halted, according to a report by Sponichi Annex, following the death of the Sexy Tanaka-san manga's creator Hinako Ashihara in January.	
October 5	Ahead of the premiere of the Dragon Ball Daima anime series, the Japanese voice actor for Dragon Ball character Yamcha has been replaced for the first time in 38 years.	
October 6	The 2024 MotoGP World Championship was held at 2024 Japanese motorcycle Grand Prix.	
November 29	NNN/NNS core affiliates, Yomiuri TV, Chukyo TV, The Sapporo Television Broadcasting and Fukuoka Broadcasting System Corp. announced their intentions to merge and integrate their operations under a holding company known as Yomiuri Chukyo FS Broadcasting Holdings.	
December 27	Kyohei Iida, former member and founder of Cardfight!! Vanguard DivineZ theme song performing group Kis-My-Ft2, and Junya Tanaka file a lawsuit in Clark County, Nevada against the Johnny & Associates talent agency about the sexual abuse of late founder Johnny Kitagawa.	
December 27	As announced by Toei Animation, the Moon World Colony Championship arc is confirmed as the Run for Money: The Great Mission anime's final arc, started from November 17, 2024.	
December 31	Bleach: Thousand-Year Blood War voice actors Yumi Uchiyama and Yūsuke Kobayashi announce their marriage on New Year's Eve.	

== Ongoing ==
Show	Type	Channel	First aired/Japanese period		Source
NHK
NHK Amateur Song Contest	Talent show	NHK-G, NHK World Premium	March 15, 1953 (TV)	Showa	
With Mother	Kids	E-TV, NHK World Premium	October 5, 1959	Showa	
Nintama Rantarō	Anime	NHK	April 10, 1993	Heisei	
Ojarumaru	Anime	NHK	October 5, 1998	Heisei	
Utacon	Music	NHK-G, NHK World Premium	April 12, 2016	Heisei	
Nippon Television Network System
Shōten	Comedy	Nippon Television	May 15, 1966	Showa	
Soreike! Anpanman	Anime	Nippon Television	October 3, 1988	Showa	
Downtown no Gaki no Tsukai ya Arahende!!	Game show	Nippon Television	October 3, 1989	Heisei	
Detective Conan	Anime	NNS	January 8, 1996	Heisei	
Fuji Network System
Music Fair	Music	Fuji TV	August 31, 1964	Showa	
Sazae-san	Anime	Fuji TV	October 5, 1969	Showa	
FNS Music Festival	Music	FNS	July 2, 1974	Showa	
Chibi Maruko-chan (Note: During this anime's broadcast in 2024, titular character Momoko "Maruko" Sakura had her voice actress replaced)	Anime	Fuji TV	January 8, 1995	Heisei	
One Piece	Anime	Fuji TV	October 20, 1999	Heisei	
TV Tokyo
Ninjala	Anime	TV Tokyo	January 8, 2022	Reiwa	
Yu-Gi-Oh! Go Rush!!	Anime	TV Tokyo	April 3, 2022	Reiwa	
Pokémon	Anime	TV Tokyo	April 14, 2023	Reiwa	
TV Asahi
Super Hero Time	Tokusatsu	TV Asahi	September 28, 2003	Heisei	
Crayon Shin-chan	Anime	TV Asahi	April 13, 1992	Heisei	
Doraemon	Anime	TV Asahi	April 15, 2005	Heisei	
Music Station	Music	TV Asahi	October 24, 1986	Showa	
TBS
SASUKE	Sports	TBS	September 26, 1997	Heisei	
Count Down TV	Music	TBS	April 7, 1993	Heisei	

== New series and returning shows ==
Show	Network	Premiere	Finale	Status	Source
Gushing over Magical Girls	Tokyo MX	January 3, 2024	March 27, 2024	Season Ended	
The Demon Prince of Momochi House	Tokyo MX	January 6, 2024	March 23, 2024	Series Ended	
Pon no Michi	TBS	January 6, 2024	March 23, 2024	Series Ended	
Tales of Wedding Rings	Tokyo MX	January 6, 2024	March 23, 2024	Season Ended; Renewed for Season 2	
Dear Radiance	NHK	January 7, 2024	December 15, 2024	Series Ended	
7th Time Loop: The Villainess Enjoys a Carefree Life Married to Her Worst Enemy!	Tokyo MX	January 7, 2024	March 24, 2024	Series Ended	
Banished from the Hero's Party (Season 2)	Tokyo MX	January 7, 2024	March 24, 2024	Series Ended	
Fluffy Paradise	Tokyo MX	January 7, 2024	March 24, 2024	Series Ended	
The Dangers in My Heart (Season 2)	TV Asahi	January 7, 2024	March 31, 2024	Season Ended	
'Tis Time for "Torture," Princess	Tokyo MX	January 9, 2024	March 26, 2024	Season Ended; Renewed for Season 2	
The Foolish Angel Dances with the Devil	TV Tokyo	January 9, 2024	March 26, 2024	Series Ended	
Synduality: Noir (Season 2)	TV Tokyo	January 9, 2024	March 26, 2024	Series Ended	
Doctor Elise	Tokyo MX	January 10, 2024	March 27, 2024	Series Ended	
Shaman King: Flowers	TV Tokyo	January 10, 2024	April 3, 2024	Series Ended	
Delusional Monthly Magazine	Tokyo MX	January 11, 2024	March 28, 2024	Series Ended	
Isekai Onsen Paradise	Tokyo MX	January 12, 2024	March 29, 2024	Series Ended	
Urusei Yatsura (Season 2)	Fuji TV	January 12, 2024	June 21, 2024	Series Ended	
Bucchigiri?!	TV Tokyo	January 13, 2024	April 6, 2024	Series Ended	
Ultraman New Generation Stars (Season 2)	TV Tokyo	January 27, 2024	June 22, 2024	Season Ended	
Wonderful Pretty Cure!	TV Asahi	February 4, 2024	January 26, 2025	Ending 2025	
Bakuage Sentai Boonboomger	TV Asahi	March 3, 2024	February 9, 2025	Ending 2025	
The Tiger and Her Wings	NHK	April 1, 2024	September 27, 2024	Series Ended	
Train to the End of the World	Tokyo MX	April 1, 2024	June 24, 2024	Series Ended	
Spice and Wolf: Merchant Meets the Wise Wolf	TV Tokyo	April 2, 2024	September 24, 2024	Season Ended; Renewed for Season 2	
Laid-Back Camp: Season 3	AT-X	April 4, 2024	June 20, 2024	Season Ended; Renewed for Season 4	
Nijiyon Animation (Season 2)	Tokyo MX	April 5, 2024	June 21, 2024	Series Ended	
That Time I Got Reincarnated as a Slime (Season 3)	Nippon TV	April 5, 2024	September 27, 2024	Season Ended; Renewed for Season 4	
Astro Note	Tokyo MX	April 5, 2024	June 21, 2024	Series Ended	
The Irregular at Magic High School (3rd season)	Tokyo MX	April 5, 2024	June 28, 2024	Season Ended	
A Salad Bowl of Eccentrics	TBS	April 5, 2024	June 21, 2024	Series Ended	
Wind Breaker	TBS	April 5, 2024	June 28, 2024	Season Ended; Renewed for Season 2	
Girls Band Cry	Tokyo MX	April 6, 2024	June 29, 2024	Seried Ended	
The Idolmaster Shiny Colors	TV Tokyo	April 6, 2024	June 22, 2024	Season Ended; Renewed for Season 2	
Highspeed Etoile	TBS	April 6, 2024	June 22, 2024	Series Ended	
Studio Apartment, Good Lighting, Angel Included	Tokyo MX	April 6, 2024	June 22, 2024	Series Ended	
Go! Go! Loser Ranger!	TBS	April 7, 2024	June 30, 2024	Season Ended; Renewed for Season 2	
Mission: Yozakura Family	TBS	April 7, 2024	October 6, 2024	Season Ended; Renewed for Season 2	
The Fable	Nippon TV	April 7, 2024	September 29, 2024	Season Ended; Renewed for Season 2	
Shinkalion: Change the World	TV Tokyo	April 7, 2024	February 2, 2025	Ending 2025	
Himitsu no AiPri	TV Tokyo	April 7, 2024	March 30, 2025	Ending 2025; Season 2 premieres in April 2025	
Rinkai!	Tokyo MX	April 9, 2024	June 25, 2024	Series Ended	
Oblivion Battery	TV Tokyo	April 10, 2024	July 3, 2024	Season Ended; Renewed for Season 2	
The Many Sides of Voice Actor Radio	Tokyo MX	April 10, 2024	June 26, 2024	Series Ended	
Black Butler: Public School Arc	Tokyo MX	April 13, 2024	June 22, 2024	Season Ended	
Kaiju No. 8	TV Tokyo	April 13, 2024	June 29, 2024	Season Ended; Renewed for Season 2	
Whisper Me a Love Song	TV Asahi	April 13, 2024	December 29, 2024	Series Ended	
My Hero Academia (Season 7)	Nippon TV	May 4, 2024	October 12, 2024	Season Ended; Renewed for Final Season	
Demon Slayer: Kimetsu no Yaiba – Hashira Training Arc	Fuji TV	May 12, 2024	June 30, 2024	Season Ended	
Shy (Season 2)	TV Tokyo	July 1, 2024	September 24, 2024	Series Ended	
Oshi no Ko (Season 2)	Tokyo MX	July 3, 2024	October 6, 2024	Season Ended	
Red Cat Ramen	TBS	July 4, 2024	September 19, 2024	Season Ended; Renewed for Season 2	
Senpai Is an Otokonoko	Fuji TV	July 5, 2024	September 27, 2024	Series Ended	
2.5 Dimensional Seduction	Tokyo MX	July 5, 2024	December 13, 2024	Season Ended; Renewed for Season 2	
The Café Terrace and Its Goddesses (Season 2)	TBS	July 5, 2024	September 20, 2024	Series Ended	
Grendizer U	TV Tokyo	July 5, 2024	September 28, 2024	Series Ended	
Ultraman Arc	TV Tokyo	July 6, 2024	January 18, 2025	Ending 2025	
Quality Assurance in Another World	TBS	July 6, 2024	September 28, 2024	Series Ended	
Dungeon People	TBS	July 6, 2024	September 28, 2024	Series Ended	
Sakuna: Of Rice and Ruin	TV Tokyo	July 6, 2024	September 28, 2024	Series Ended	
Plus-Sized Elf	Tokyo MX	July 7, 2024	September 22, 2024	Series Ended	
My Deer Friend Nokotan	Tokyo MX	July 7, 2024	September 22, 2024	Series Ended	
Fairy Tail: 100 Years Quest	TV Tokyo	July 7, 2024	January 5, 2025	Ending 2025	
Wistoria: Wand and Sword	TBS	July 7, 2024	September 29, 2024	Season Ended; Renewed for Season 2	
Shōshimin: How to Become Ordinary	TV Asahi	July 7, 2024	September 15, 2024	Season Ended; Renewed for Season 2	
Kamen Rider Gavv	TV Asahi	September 1, 2024	Currently airing	Continues 2025	
Baby Assassins Everyday!	TV Tokyo	September 4, 2024	November 20, 2024	Season Ended	
Omusubi	NHK	September 30, 2024	March 28, 2025	Ending 2025	
Let This Grieving Soul Retire!	Tokyo MX	October 1, 2024	December 24, 2024	Season Ended; Renewed for Season 2	
Tying the Knot with an Amagami Sister	TV Tokyo	October 2, 2024	March 25, 2025	Ending 2025	
Re:Zero − Starting Life in Another World (Season 3)	TV Tokyo	October 2, 2024	March 26, 2025	Ending 2025	
Blue Box	TBS	October 3, 2024	March 27, 2025	Season Ended; Renewed for Season 2	
Dandadan	TBS	October 4, 2024	December 20, 2024	Season Ended; Renewed for Season 2	
Magilumiere Co. Ltd.	Nippon TV	October 4, 2024	December 20, 2024	Season Ended; Renewed for Season 2	
Rurouni Kenshin: Kyoto Disturbance	Fuji TV	October 4, 2024	March 21, 2025	Ending 2025; Renewed for Season 3	
Blue Lock (Season 2)	TV Asahi	October 5, 2024	December 28, 2024	Season Ended	
Tōhai	TBS	October 5, 2024	April 5, 2025	Ending 2025	
Mahō Tsukai ni Narenakatta Onna no Ko no Hanashi	TBS	October 5, 2024	December 21, 2024	Series Ended	
Bleach: Thousand-Year Blood War (Part 3)	TV Tokyo	October 5, 2024	December 28, 2024	Season Ended	
The Idolmaster Shiny Colors (Season 2)	TV Tokyo	October 5, 2024	December 21, 2024	Series Ended	
The Seven Deadly Sins: Four Knights of the Apocalypse (Season 2)	TBS	October 6, 2024	December 29, 2024	Season Ended	
Ranma ½ (2024 series)	Nippon TV	October 6, 2024	December 22, 2024	Season Ended; Renewed for Season 2	
Party kara Tsuihō Sareta Sono Chiyushi, Jitsu wa Saikyō ni Tsuki	TV Asahi	October 6, 2024	December 22, 2024	Series Ended	
Puniru Is a Cute Slime	TV Tokyo	October 6, 2024	December 23, 2024	Season Ended; Renewed for Season 2	
Love Live! Superstar!! (Season 3)	NHK-E	October 6, 2024	December 22, 2024	Series Ended	
You Are Ms. Servant	TV Asahi	October 6, 2024	December 22, 2024	Series Ended	
Dragon Ball Daima	Fuji TV	October 11, 2024	February 28, 2025	Ending 2025	
Goodbye, Dragon Life	TBS	October 11, 2024	December 27, 2024	Series Ended	
Shangri-La Frontier (Season 2)	TBS	October 13, 2024	March 30, 2025	Ending 2025	
The Blue Wolves of Mibu	Nippon TV	October 19, 2024	March 29, 2025	Ending 2025	
Wing-Man	TV Tokyo	October 22, 2024	December 25, 2024	Series Ended	
Red Blue	TBS	December 18, 2024	February 12, 2025	Ending 2025	

== Ending ==
End date	Show	Channel	First aired	Replaced by	Source
January 20	Ultraman Blazar	TV Tokyo	July 8, 2023	Ultraman New Generation Stars (Season 2)	
January 28	Soaring Sky! Pretty Cure	TV Asahi	February 5, 2023	Wonderful Pretty Cure!	
February 25	Ohsama Sentai King-Ohger	TV Asahi	March 5, 2023	Bakuage Sentai Boonboomger	
March 23	Pon no Michi	TBS	January 6, 2024	Highspeed Etoile	
March 23	Firefighter Daigo: Rescuer in Orange	Nippon TV	September 30, 2023	My Hero Academia (Season 7) (Note: My Hero Academia Memories special to air first in April 2024 before the main My Hero Academia TV anime's 7th season)	
March 24	The Apothecary Diaries	Nippon TV	October 22, 2023	The Fable	
March 26	The Foolish Angel Dances with the Devil	TV Tokyo	January 9, 2024	Spice and Wolf: Merchant Meets the Wise Wolf	
March 29	Boogie Woogie	NHK	October 12, 2023	The Tiger and Her Wings	
March 30	Sekai Fushigi Hakken!	TBS	April 19, 1986	Yononaka Nandemo How Much	
March 31	The Seven Deadly Sins: Four Knights of the Apocalypse	TBS	October 8, 2023	Go! Go! Loser Ranger!	
March 31	Shangri-La Frontier	TBS	October 1, 2023	Mission: Yozakura Family	
March 31	Duel Masters Win Duel Wars	TV Tokyo	April 2, 2023	Shinkalion: Change the World	
March 31	The Dangers in My Heart (Season 2)	TV Asahi	January 7, 2024	Shōshimin: How to Become Ordinary (Note: Before 'Shōshimin: How to Become Ordinary' premieres, episodes 1 to 10 of another anime, Whisper Me a Love Song, aired from April to June 2024)	
April 3	Shaman King: Flowers	TV Tokyo	January 10, 2024	Oblivion Battery	
April 6	Bucchigiri?!	TV Tokyo	January 13, 2024	Kaiju No. 8	
June 21	Urusei Yatsura	Fuji TV	October 14, 2022	Senpai Is an Otokonoko	
June 22	Ultraman New Generation Stars (Season 2)	TV Tokyo	January 27, 2024	Ultraman Arc	
June 22	Highspeed Etoile	TBS	April 6, 2024	Dungeon People	
June 29	Kaiju No. 8	TV Tokyo	April 13, 2024	Sakuna: Of Rice and Ruin	
June 30	Go! Go! Loser Ranger!	TBS	April 7, 2024	Wistoria: Wand and Sword	
July 3	Oblivion Battery	TV Tokyo	April 10, 2024	Mononoke (Note: This is a TV Tokyo rerun of a TV anime that first aired on Fuji TV in 2007)	
August 25	Kamen Rider Gotchard	TV Asahi	September 3, 2023	Kamen Rider Gavv	
September 15	Shōshimin: How to Become Ordinary	TV Asahi	July 7, 2024	You Are Ms. Servant	
September 20	The Café Terrace and Its Goddesses (Season 2)	TBS	July 5, 2024	Dandadan	
September 27	The Tiger and Her Wings	NHK	April 1, 2024	Omusubi	
September 27	Senpai Is an Otokonoko	Fuji TV	July 5, 2024	Rurouni Kenshin: Kyoto Disturbance	
September 28	Quality Assurance in Another World	TBS	July 6, 2024	Tōhai	
September 28	Dungeon People	TBS	July 6, 2014	Mahō Tsukai ni Narenakatta Onna no Ko no Hanashi	
September 28	Shadowverse Flame	TV Tokyo	April 2, 2022	Uma Musume Pretty Derby (Season 2) (Note: This is a TV Tokyo rerun of the Uma Musume Pretty Derby TV anime's second season which previously first aired on Tokyo MX in 2021)	
September 29	The Fable	Nippon TV	April 7, 2024	Ranma ½ (2024 series)	
September 29	Wistoria: Wand and Sword	TBS	July 7, 2024	The Seven Deadly Sins: Four Knights of the Apocalypse (Season 2)	
October 6	Mission: Yozakura Family	TBS	April 7, 2024	Shangri-La Frontier (Season 2)	
December 15	Dear Radiance	NHK	January 7, 2024	Unbound	
December 21	Mahō Tsukai ni Narenakatta Onna no Ko no Hanashi	TBS	October 5, 2024	Welcome to Japan, Ms. Elf!	
December 22	You Are Ms. Servant	TV Asahi	October 6, 2024	Medalist	
December 29	The Seven Deadly Sins: Four Knights of the Apocalypse (Season 2)	TBS	October 6, 2024	Toilet-Bound Hanako-kun (Season 2)	

== Sports ==
Airdate	Sports	Network	Source
January 12 - February 10	2023 AFC Asian Cup	DAZN, TV Asahi	
March 30	2023–24 Formula E World Championship	J Sports	
April 7	2024 Formula One World Championship	Fuji TV Next	
July 26–11 August	Paris 2024 Olympics	TBS, NHK	
August 28 - September 8	Paris 2024 Paralympics	TBS, NHK	
October 6	2024 MotoGP World Championship	G+	

== Special events and milestone episodes ==
Airdate	Show	Episode	Network	Source
April 13	News Pokémon Satellite		TV Tokyo	
December 28	Whisper Me a Love Song	Episodes 11 & 12	TV Asahi	
December 31	75th NHK Kōhaku Uta Gassen		NHK	
December 31	Doraemon	New Year special	TV Asahi	

== Deaths ==
Date	Name	Age	Notable Works	Source
January 12	Jiro Hirano	83	News anchor (NHK)	
January 12	Haruo Takahashi	76	Animator (Tensai Bakabon, Tiger Mask)	
January 16	Esper Itō	63	Comedian (Koko ga Hen da yo Nihonjin)	
January 19	Utae Shoji	94	Comedian, actress (Grandpa's Kitchen)	
January 22	Takashi Ezure	82	Screenwriter (Kamen Rider Super-1, Sukeban Deka)	
January 25	Tomohiro Marukawa	53	Original creator (The World of Narue)	
January 27	Susumu Taira	89	Actor (Jun to Ai)	
January 29	Hinako Ashihara	50	Original creator (Sand Chronicles, Sexy Tanaka-san)	
February 8	Bon Ishihara	68	Voice actor (Fullmetal Alchemist: Brotherhood, Shingu: Secret of the Stellar Wars)	
February 20	Yoko Yamamoto	81	Actress (Nemuri Kyōshirō)	
February 27	Masaaki Maeda	91	Voice actor (Mobile Suit Gundam F91)	
March 1	Akira Toriyama	68	Original creator (Dr. Slump, Dragon Ball, Dragon Ball Z, Dragon Ball GT, Dragon Ball Super)	
March 4	Tarako	63	Voice actress (Chibi Maruko-chan, Pluster World, Danganronpa 3: The End of Hope's Peak High School, Magical Taruruto-kun)	
March 10	Mutsumi Inomata	63	Animator (Urusei Yatsura), character designer (Future GPX Cyber Formula)	
March 14	Minori Terada	81	Actor (Ultraman Max, Kamen Rider W)	
March 29	Kenji Suzuki	95	Announcer (NHK)	
April 11	Yasuo Muramatsu	91	Voice actor (One Piece, Case Closed)	
April 15	Takaaki Seki	54	Voice actor (Gallery Fake, Ronja, the Robber's Daughter)	
April 18	Keiko Yamamoto	83	Voice actress (Chibi Maruko-chan, Demashita! Powerpuff Girls Z)	
May 16	Akira Nakao	81	Actor (Saka no Ue no Kumo, Hideyoshi)	
May 17	Hideyuki Umezu	68	Voice actor (Zoids Wild, Zatch Bell!, Holly the Ghost)	
May 20	Eiko Masuyama	88	Voice actress (Mahōtsukai Chappy, Cutie Honey)	
May 30	Akira Shigino	70	Director (Chō Kōsoku Galvion, Nanako SOS, Osomatsu-kun)	
May 31	Yuka Motohashi	46	Actress (Gekisou Sentai Carranger, Avataro Sentai Donbrothers)	
June 8	Keisuke Yamashita	83	Voice actor (Tico and Friends, Reideen The Brave), dubbing actor (The Tom and Jerry Show)	
June 9	Yoshiko Kuga	93	Actress (Karei-naru Ichizoku)	
June 16	Hiroyuki Omori	57	Producer (Jojo's Bizarre Adventure series)	
June 19	Katsue Miwa	80	Voice actress (Moomin, Yu-Gi-Oh!, Perman)	
June 26	Taiki Matsuno	56	Voice actor (Sailor Moon SuperS, Fresh Pretty Cure!, Digimon Ghost Game, Ninpu Sentai Hurricanger), dubbing actor (SpongeBob SquarePants)	
July 2	Kenkichi Hamahata	81	Actor (Ōgon no Hibi, Hissatsu Karakurinin Keppūhen)	
July 8	Terue Shoji	91	Comedian (Hai! Next Person)	
July 12	Noriko Ohara	88	Voice actress (Doraemon, Yatterman)	
July 14	Shiro Yadama	80	Original creator (Fair, then Partly Piggy)	
July 22	Nobuhiro Sakata	76	Original creator (Dan Doh!!)	
August 20	Atsuko Tanaka	61	Voice actress (Naruto, JoJo's Bizarre Adventure)	
September 2	Toshiyuki Manabe	32	Voice actor (Hensuki: Are you willing to fall in love with a pervert, as long as she's a cutie?), dubbing actor (Doctor Who)	
September 8	Emi Shinohara	61	Voice actress (Sailor Moon, Cardcaptor Sakura, Naruto Shippuden)	
September 15	Yukihiro Shibutani	63	Art director (Detective Conan series)	
September 20	Sayuri	28	Ending theme performer (My Hero Academia)	
September 29	Nobuyo Ōyama	90	Voice actress (Doraemon, Danganronpa: The Animation)	
October 4	Yukio Hattori	78	Expert commentator (Iron Chef)	
October 13	Shigemi Ikeda	69	Art director (Mobile Suit Gundam Unicorn RE:0096, My Hero Academia, Inuyasha)	
October 14	Keizō Murase	89	Suitmaker (Kamen Rider, Ultraman Ace)	
October 17	Toshiyuki Nishida	76	Actor (The 13 Lords of the Shogun)	
October 18	Noboru Kimura	72	Lead singer of TALIZMAN who are the theme song performers of Ultraman 80	(Note: Noboru Kimura's death was announced on October 21, 2024)
October 23	Ryō Kōno	??	Art director (Mob Psycho 100, Space Dandy, Paradise Kiss)	
October 28	Kazuo Umezu	88	Original creator (Cat Eyed Boy)	
November 6	Michie Kita	89	Voice actress (Don Dracula, Dog of Flanders, Obake no Q-Tarō)	
November 6	Hiroki Ikeshita	47	Animator (Pokémon, Yo-kai Watch, Sonic X), director (Shangri-La Frontier)	
November 12	Eiji Yanagisawa	57	Voice actor (The Melancholy of Haruhi Suzumiya, Naruto, Digimon Frontier)	
November 13	Shuntarō Tanikawa	92	Theme song lyrics writer (Big X, Astro Boy)	
November 14	Shōhei Hino	75	Actor (Orenochi wa Taninnochi, The Light Shines Only There)	
November 18	Junko Hori	89	Voice actress (Ninja Hattori-kun, Tokyo Mew Mew, Crayon Shin-chan), dubbing actress (The Simpsons)	
November 24	Yōji Kuri	96	Original creator (Gokiburi-chan)	
December 6	Miho Nakayama	54	Actress (Nemureru Mori), theme song performer (Delicious Relations, FOR YOU)	
