= Forbidden dance =

Forbidden dance may refer to:

- Forbidden Dance, a manga series about a high school ballet student
- Lambada (dance), a dance from Pará, Brazil, of African origin, also known as the "forbidden dance"
  - Two rival films released in 1990 about the dance
    - Lambada (film)
    - The Forbidden Dance
