= Kinouchi =

Kinouchi (written: 木内 or 木之内) is a Japanese surname. Notable people with the surname include:

- Akiko Kinouchi (木内 晶子, born 1981), Japanese actress
- Midori Kinouchi (木之内 みどり, born 1981), Japanese idol and actress
- Kazel Kinouchi (木ノ内カゼル, born 1991), Filipino-Japanese actress
