= Piece (manga) =

Japanese manga series

- Genre: Drama; Romance
- Manga
- Written by: Hinako Ashihara
- Published by: Shogakukan
- Imprint: Flower Comics
- Magazine: Betsucomi
- Original run: April 13, 2008 – April 13, 2013
- Volumes: 10
- Television drama
- Written by: Tetsuya Oishi; Yuko Matsuda
- Music by: Eishi Segawa
- Studio: VAP
- Original network: NTV
- Original run: October 6, 2012 – December 29, 2012
- Episodes: 13

Piece, originally serialized as Piece: Kanojo no Kioku (Japanese: Piece～彼女の記憶～; lit. "Piece: Her Memory"), is a Japanese manga series written and illustrated by Hinako Ashihara. It was serialized in Shogakukan's Betsucomi magazine, premiering in the May 2008 issue and concluding in the May 2013 issue (each one released on April 13 in their respective years.) Shogakukan collected the individual chapters into 10 bound volumes from December 2008, to June 2013.

in 2013, Piece won the 58th Shogakukan Manga Award in the shōjo category.

== Plot ==
After learning that her former high school classmate, Haruka Origuchi, has died from an illness, Mizuho Suga meets her other classmate, Hikaru Narumi, at the funeral. Back in their high school days, Hikaru was famous for being a playboy, and they both had to keep their relationship a secret.

== Characters ==
- Mizuho Suga (須賀 水帆, Suga Mizuho), portrayed by Tsubasa Honda
- Hikaru Narumi (成海 皓, Narumi Hikaru), portrayed by Yuma Nakayama
- Madoka Setouchi (瀬戸内 円, Setouchi Madoka), portrayed by Airi Suzuki
- Remi Nishida (西田 礼美, Nishida Remi), portrayed by Moe Arai
- Takashi Yanai (矢内 高史, Yanai Takashi), portrayed by Hokuto Matsumura
- Haruka Origuchi (折口 はるか, Origuchi Haruka), portrayed by Elina Mizuno
- Yuu Sugawara (菅原 勇, Sugawara Yuu), portrayed by Yuki Nozawa
- Miyamoto (宮本), portrayed by Tsutomo Takahashi
- Akito Miyamoto (宮本 秋人, Miyamoto Akito), portrayed by Tatsuki Ishikawa
- Kimiko Nanao (七尾 君子, Nanao Kimiko), portrayed by Hana Kino
- Risako Narumi (成海 理沙子, Narumi Risako), portrayed by Naho Toda
- Hiro Narumi (成海 比呂, Narumi Hiro), portrayed by Yuma Nakayama
- Matsuura (松浦)

== Media ==
=== Manga ===
Piece written and illustrated by Hinako Ashihara. It was serialized in Shogakukan's Betsucomi magazine, premiering in the May 2008 issue and concluding in the May 2013 issue (each released on April 13 in their respective years). Shogakukan collected the individual chapters into 10 bound volumes from December 24, 2008, to June 26, 2013. It is licensed in France by Kana, in Germany by Tokyopop Germany, and in Italy by Panini Comics.

=== Live-action series ===
Piece was also adapted into a live-action television drama series which aired on NTV in Japan from October 6, 2012, to December 29, 2012.

== Reception ==
Piece won the 58th Shogakukan Manga Award in the shōjo category in 2013.

Volume 6 of the manga sold 41,935 copies as of July 31, 2011; volume 7 sold 43,668 copies as of January 1, 2012; volume 8 sold 45,292 copies as of July 1, 2012; and volume 9 sold 68,456 copies as of January 6, 2013.
