= Nakama (song) =

2025 single by Zedd featuring Ai

- Digital cover

Single by Zedd featuring Ai
- Language: Japanese; English
- A-side: "Jaka Jaan"
- Released: 19 February 2025
- Recorded: 2024
- Length: 2:15
- Label: Interscope
- Songwriters: Ai Carina Uemura; Anton Zaslavski
- Producers: Zedd; Ellis

Zedd singles chronology
"Lucky" (2024)	"Nakama" / "Jaka Jaan" (2025)

Ai singles chronology
"Tide" (2024)	"Nakama" (2025)	"My Wish" (2025)

"Nakama" is a song recorded by German record producer Zedd featuring Japanese-American singer Ai, released on 19 February 2025, through Interscope Records. Serving as the ending theme for the Japanese anime series Dragon Ball Daima, the song was written by Zedd and Ai with additional production by British producer Ellis.

== Background ==
Following a partial cast reveal and trailer for Dragon Ball Daima in September 2024, Toei Animation announced Zedd produced the opening song "Jaka Jaan" with vocals recorded by Japanese pop duo C&K. Within a week, Toei Animation revealed more cast members alongside the ending theme for the series, "Nakama" by Zedd featuring Ai.

== Production ==
Ai wrote the lyrics to "Nakama" while Zedd composed the song's melody. Ai and Zedd met in Japan to discuss what kind of song they would write. Ai described to Billboard that it was "really easy" to write Japanese lyrics to the piano demo Zedd sent to her. She revealed translating the Japanese lyrics she wrote into English to match the melody was "a lot harder." Alongside producing the song, Zedd mixed and mastered "Nakama".

== Release ==
On 10 December 2024, an anime version of "Nakama" was released digitally as a promotional single with an accompanying lyric video. Universal Music Japan later announced the full release of "Nakama" alongside "Jaka Jaan" as a limited double A-side single, released in Japan on 19 February 2025. Ai's label EMI Records later announced "Nakama" as a bonus track for her greatest hits album, 25th the Best – Alive.

== Live performances ==
Ai performed "Nakama" for the first time during the Japanese premiere screening of Dragon Ball Daima in October 2024. At the 2024 FNS Music Festival, Zedd and Ai performed "Nakama".

== Track listing ==
- Digital download and streaming – anime version
1. "Nakama" (anime version) – 1:02
- Digital download and streaming – Spotify version
1. "Nakama" – 2:15
2. "Nakama" (anime version) – 1:01
3. "Nakama" (instrumental) – 2:15
- CD single
1. "Jaka Jaan" (ジャカ☆ジャ〜ン) – 3:01
2. "Jaka Jaan" (anime version) – 1:32
3. "Jaka Jaan" (instrumental) – 3:01
4. "Nakama" – 2:15
5. "Nakama" (anime version) – 1:01
6. "Nakama" (instrumental) – 2:15

== Personnel ==
- Ai – lead vocals, songwriting
- Zedd – songwriting, production, mixing, mastering
- Ellis – production
- Ryan Shanahan – engineering
- Akihiro Furuichi – recording, engineering

== Charts ==
Chart performance for "Nakama"
Chart (2024–2025)	Peak position
Japan Download Songs (Billboard Japan)	82
Japan Top Singles Sales (Billboard Japan) with "Jaka Jaan"	29
Japan (Oricon) with "Jaka Jaan"	26

== Release history ==
Release history and formats for "Nakama"
Region	Date	Format(s)	Version	Label	Ref.
Various	10 December 2024	Digital download; streaming	Anime	Interscope	
Various	14 February 2025	Digital download; streaming	Full	Interscope	
Japan	19 February 2025	CD	Maxi single	Interscope; Universal Japan	
