= Jaka Jaan =

2025 single by Zedd featuring C&K

- Digital cover

Single by Zedd featuring C&K
- Language: Japanese
- A-side: "Nakama"
- Released: 19 February 2025
- Recorded: 2024
- Label: Interscope
- Songwriters: Yukinojo Mori; Anton Zaslavski; Keen
- Producer: Zedd

Zedd singles chronology
"Lucky" (2024)	"Jaka Jaan" / "Nakama" (2025)

C&K singles chronology
"Heart Beat" (2024)	"Jaka Jaan" (2025)

"Jaka Jaan" (ジャカ☆ジャ〜ン, Jaka Jān) is a song recorded by German record producer Zedd featuring Japanese pop duo C&K, released on 19 February 2025, through Interscope Records. Serving as the opening theme for the Japanese anime series Dragon Ball Daima, the song was written by Zedd, Yukinojo Mori, and Keen.

== Background ==
Following a partial cast reveal and trailer for Dragon Ball Daima in September 2024, Toei Animation announced Zedd produced the opening song "Jaka Jaan" with vocals recorded by Japanese pop duo C&K. Within a week, Toei Animation revealed more cast members alongside the ending theme for the series, "Nakama" by Zedd featuring Japanese-American singer Ai.

== Release ==
On 4 December 2024, an anime version of "Jaka Jaan" was released digitally as a promotional single with an accompanying lyric video. Universal Music Japan later announced the full release of "Jaka Jaan" alongside "Nakama" as a limited double A-side single, which was released in Japan on 19 February 2025. A full version of "Jaka Jaan" was released digitally on 7 February 2025.

== Live performances ==
C&K performed "Jaka Jaan" for the first time during the Japanese premiere screening of Dragon Ball Daima in October 2024. At the 2024 FNS Music Festival, Zedd and C&K performed "Jaka Jaan".

== Track listing ==
- Digital download and streaming – anime version
1. "Jaka Jaan" (anime version) – 1:32
- Digital download and streaming – full version
1. "Jaka Jaan" – 3:01
- Digital download and streaming – Spotify version
1. "Jaka Jaan" – 3:01
2. "Jaka Jaan" (anime version) – 1:32
3. "Jaka Jaan" (instrumental) – 3:01
- CD single
1. "Jaka Jaan" – 3:01
2. "Jaka Jaan" (anime version) – 1:32
3. "Jaka Jaan" (instrumental) – 3:01
4. "Nakama" – 2:15
5. "Nakama" (anime version) – 1:02
6. "Nakama" (instrumental) – 2:15

== Personnel ==
- C&K – lead vocals
- Zedd – songwriting, production, mixing, mastering, background vocals
- Keen – songwriting
- Yukinojo Mori – songwriting
- Nathaniel Smith – cello
- Jeremy Kittel – strings arrangement, viola, violin
- Mark Dover – clarinet
- Ryan Shanahan – engineering
- Kunihiro Imazeki – recording, engineering

== Charts ==
Chart performance for "Jaka Jaan"
Chart (2024–2025)	Peak position
Japan Download Songs (Billboard Japan)	39
Japan Top Singles Sales (Billboard Japan) with "Nakama"	29
Japan (Oricon) with "Nakama"	26

== Release history ==
Release history and formats for "Jaka Jaan"
Region	Date	Format(s)	Version	Label	Ref.
Various	4 December 2024	Digital download; streaming	Anime	Interscope	
Various	7 February 2025	Digital download; streaming	Full	Interscope	
Japan	19 February 2025	CD	Maxi single	Interscope; Universal Japan	
