= Sexy Tanaka-san =

Japanese manga series

- First volume cover

セクシー田中さん (Sekushī Tanaka-san)
- Genre: Yuri, romantic comedy
- Manga
- Written by: Hinako Ashihara
- Published by: Shogakukan
- Magazine: Anekei Petit Comic
- Original run: August 5, 2017 – December 5, 2023
- Volumes: 8
- Television drama
- Directed by: Ryūichi Inomata; Akinori Itō
- Written by: Tomoko Aizawa
- Music by: Moe Hyūga
- Studio: Nippon Television
- Original network: NNS (Nippon TV)
- Original run: October 22, 2023 – December 24, 2023
- Episodes: 10

Sexy Tanaka-san (セクシー田中さん, Sekushī Tanaka-san) is a Japanese manga series written and illustrated by Hinako Ashihara. It was serialized in Shogakukan's Anekei Petit Comic digital manga magazine from August 2017 to December 2023. The series was left unfinished due to Ashihara's death. A live-action television drama adaptation aired from October to December 2023 on Nippon TV.

== Media ==
=== Manga ===
Written and illustrated by Hinako Ashihara, Sexy Tanaka-san began serialization in Shogakukan's Anekei Petit Comic digital manga magazine on August 5, 2017. Its chapters were collected into eight tankōbon volumes from April 10, 2018 to October 10, 2024.

==== Volumes ====
No.	Release date	ISBN
1	April 10, 2018	978-4-09-870061-5
2	August 9, 2019	978-4-09-870560-3
3	October 9, 2020	978-4-09-871189-5
4	August 10, 2021	978-4-09-871431-5
5	April 8, 2021	978-4-09-871650-0
6	February 9, 2023	978-4-09-872020-0
7	October 10, 2023	978-4-09-872451-2
8	October 10, 2024	978-4-09-872837-4

=== Television drama ===
A live-action television series was announced on August 1, 2023. The series starred Haruka Kinami as Kyōko Tanaka and Meru Nukumi as Akari, and was directed by Ryūichi Inomata and Akinori Itō, with scripts by Tomoko Aizawa. It aired on NTV from October 22 to December 24, 2023. The theme song "Dress Code" is produced by Imase and performed by Le Sserafim.

On January 26, 2024, Ashihara, the creator of the original manga, wrote on her blog stating that NTV did not uphold their condition of keeping the television drama adaptation faithful to the manga, citing several scenes that were cut and changes in characterization. While Ashihara was unable to speak with Aizawa and the directors personally, the first seven episodes followed the manga's plot while she wrote the scripts for the final two episodes after the proposed ending for the drama was changed. Ashihara later deleted the blog post. Following her death on January 29, NTV released a statement the same day saying that they followed protocol by consulting with her and that she approved the script. NTV later apologized and announced that it would conduct an internal investigation into the matter. The results of that investigation were released in June, concluding that due to miscommunication between Shogakukan and NTV, none of Ashihara's conditions for adaptation faithfulness and script rewrites were conveyed to the production staff at NTV. In July, NTV issued new guidelines for live-action productions, internal communications, and human resources to address the issues found during the investigation.

==== Episodes ====
No.	Title	Original release date	Japan viewership rating (Kanto region)
1	"Tanaka: Ordinary Office Lady By Day, Belly Dancer By Night"; Transliteration: "Hiru wa Jimi na OL, Yoru wa Berī Dansā Tanaka-san" (Japanese: 昼は地味なOL、夜はベリーダンサー田中さん)	October 22, 2023	7.2%
2	"Akari's revenge Plan! A Hammer of Anger Towards an Ignorant, Terrible Man!"; Transliteration: "Akari no Fukushū Keikaku! Mushinkei na Kuzu Otoko ni Ikari no Tettsui!" (Japanese: 朱里の復讐計画! 無神経なクズ男に怒りの鉄槌!)	October 29, 2023	5.8%

== Reception ==
The series won the grand prize at the 9th An An Manga Award in 2018. The series was ranked sixteenth in Takarajimasha's Kono Manga ga Sugoi! 2022 list of best manga for female readers. The series was ranked ninth at the 1st "Late Night Manga Award" hosted by Bungeishunjū's Crea magazine.

The series has over 1 million copies in circulation as of August 2023.

For the live-action television drama adaptation, it was the 5th most viewed program on TVer between October and December of 2023, with 20,510,000 view counts. At the 118th The Television Drama Academy Awards, Haruka Kinami won Best Actress, Meru Nukumi won Best Supporting Actress, and Katsuya Maiguma won Best Supporting Actor.
