= Hinako Ashihara =

Japanese manga artist (1974–2024)

Hinako Ashihara 芦原妃名子
- Born: Ritsuko Matsumoto (松本律子); January 25, 1974 Hyōgo Prefecture, Japan
- Died: January 29, 2024 (aged 50) Nikkō, Tochigi Prefecture, Japan
- Area: Manga artist
- Notable works: Piece: Kanojo no Kioku; Sand Chronicles
- Awards: 58th Shogakukan Manga Award for shōjo manga (Piece: Kanojo no Kioku); 50th Shogakukan Manga Award for shōjo manga (Sand Chronicles)

Ritsuko Matsumoto (Japanese: 松本 律子, Hepburn: Matsumoto Ritsuko; January 25, 1974 – January 29, 2024), known by the pseudonym Hinako Ashihara (芦原 妃名子, Ashihara Hinako), was a Japanese manga artist.

== Career ==
She wrote and illustrated various manga series, including, Homemade Home, Forbidden Dance, Sand Chronicles, Piece: Kanojo no Kioku, Tennen Bitter Chocolate, SOS, and Chouchou Kumo. Ashihara won the 50th Shogakukan Manga Award for her manga series Sand Chronicles, as well as the 58th Shogakukan Manga Award for Piece: Kanojo no Kioku.

Her first published work, "Sono hanashi okotowari shimasu", premiered in Bessatsu Shōjo Comic in 1994.

== Death ==
Ashihara was found dead in Nikkō, Tochigi Prefecture on January 29, 2024, in a suspected suicide. A missing persons report was filed the day before at 4 PM when police received a call that Ashihara was missing.

Three days before the discovery of her body, Ashihara posted on her blog, criticizing Nippon TV for their television drama adaptation of her manga Sexy Tanaka-san for being unfaithful to the original. She later deleted the blog post and apologized.

On February 15, 2024, NTV issued a press statement where they apologized to Ashihara's family and the TV drama's cast and crew, additionally stating that they have launched an inquiry with Shogakukan's representatives. The results of that investigation were released in June, concluding that due to miscommunication between Shogakukan and NTV, none of Ashihara's conditions for adaptation faithfulness and script rewrites were conveyed to the production staff at NTV. In July, NTV issued new guidelines for live-action productions, internal communications, and human resources to address the issues found during the investigation.

== Works ==
- Girls Lesson (1995–1996)
- Homemade Home (1996)
- Room Full of Falling Stars (Hoshifuru Heya de) (1997)
- Forbidden Dance (Tenshi no Kiss) (1997–1998)
- Derby Queen (1999–2000)
- MiSS (2000–2001)
- Tennen Bitter Chocolate (2001–2002)
- Pinky Promise (Yubikiri) (2002)
- Bitter: Nakechau Koi Monogatari (2003) (contributor)
- SOS (2003)
- Sand Chronicles (Sunadokei) (2003–2006)
- Bitter II (2004) (contributor)
- Butterfly Cloud (Chouchou Kumo) (2006)
- The Moon and the Lake (Tsuki to Mizuumi) (2007)
- Konbini S (2008)
- Piece: Kanojo no Kioku (2008–2013)
- Bread & Butter (2013–2020)
- Sexy Tanaka-san (2017–2024)

== See also ==
- List of solved missing person cases (2020s)
