= Forbidden Dance =

Japanese shōjo manga series by Hinako Ashihara

- The cover of the first volume of the English release of Forbidden Dance

天使のキス (Tenshi no Kisu)
- Genre: Drama, romance
- Manga
- Written by: Hinako Ashihara
- Published by: Shogakukan
- English publisher: NA: Tokyopop
- Imprint: Flower Comics
- Magazine: Bessatsu Shōjo Comic
- Original run: 1997 – 1998
- Volumes: 4

Forbidden Dance (Japanese: 天使のキス, Hepburn: Tenshi no Kisu; lit. "Angel's Kiss") is a Japanese manga series written and illustrated by Hinako Ashihara. It was serialized in Shogakukan's Bessatsu Shōjo Comic magazine from the June 1997 issue to the September 1998 issue. Shogakukan collected the individual chapters into four bound volumes under the Flower Comics imprint from December 1997 to December 1998. Tokyopop licensed the manga for an English-language release in North America and published four volumes from August 2003 to March 2004. The manga went out-of-print when Tokyopop closed its North American publishing division in 2011.

== Plot ==
Aya Fujii is a high school student who eats, sleeps and breathes ballet, but an accident during the National Competition causes an ankle injury for her that left her unable to dance for nearly a year. Although Aya recovers physically, she has not recovered psychologically. It isn't until she is invited to watch the performance of a small ballet troupe, called COOL, that Aya comes out of her funk. Now she has a new goal, to dance on stage with the charismatic leader of COOL: Akira Hibiya. However, since Akira has an incredibly strong presence and powerful charisma, many girls have made such proclamations that have been ignored. Thus Aya was labeled a fanatical fangirl and promptly escorted from the theater where the performance took place.

As the story progresses Aya struggles to prove her worth as a ballet dancer and earn her place in COOL, while also struggling with more typical teenage concerns such as her friends and her grades in school. While the main focus is Aya, the story also delves into the backgrounds of most of the supporting characters. Aya herself is not left out of the character development, as she refines her ballet technique and matures emotionally throughout the narrative.

== Characters ==
- Aya Fujii (藤井 彩, Fujii Aya)
- Fumika Yoshino (吉野 文佳, Yoshino Fumika)
- Akira Hibiya (日比谷 アキラ, Hibiya Akira)
- Tetsuya Takahashi (高梨 哲也, Takahashi Tetsuya)
- Nachan

== Volumes ==
No.	Original release date	Original ISBN	English release date	English ISBN
1	December 15, 1997	4-09-137441-7	August 5, 2003	1-59182-345-5
2	June 26, 1998	4-09-137442-5	October 7, 2003	1-59182-346-3
3	October 26, 1998	4-09-137443-3	January 6, 2004	1-59182-347-1
4	December 15, 1998	4-09-137444-1	March 2, 2004	1-59182-348-X
