= Shiro Yadama =

Japanese author (1944–2024)

Shiro Yadama (矢玉四郎, Yadama Shirō, February 3, 1944 – July 14, 2024) was a Japanese author.

His most famous work, Hare Tokidoki Buta, known in English as Fair, then Partly Piggy, was later written as an anime series (titled Tokyo Pig in English) by Shinichi Watanabe.

Yadama died on July 14, 2024, at the age of 80.

== Works ==
Yadama's works were translated into English by Keith Holeman.

- Fair, then Partly Piggy (はれときどきぶた Hare Tokidoki Buta)
- Tomorrow is Pig Day! and Pig Time! (あしたぶたの日ぶたじかん Ashita Buta no Hi Buta Jikan)
- Sometimes I'm a Pig (ぼくときどきぶた Boku Tokidoki Buta)

The following have not been translated:

- Hare Tokidoki Tako (はれときどきたこ)
- Boku Heso Made Manga (ぼくへそまでまんが)
- Yume Kara Yumenbo (ゆめからゆめんぼ)
- Hikkosu de Hikkosu (ヒッコスでひっこす)
