= Fair, then Partly Piggy =

Picture book series by Shiro Yadama

- Cover of the first picture book

はれときどきぶた (Hare Tokidoki Buta)
- Genre: Comedy
- Novel series
- Written by: Shiro Yadama
- Published by: Iwasaki Shoten
- Original run: September 5, 1980 – July 11, 2013
- Volumes: 10
- Anime film
- Directed by: Toshio Hirata
- Produced by: Keiichi Koyama; Koichi Murata; Yutaka Sugiyama
- Written by: Hiroo Takeuchi; Hideo Takayashiki
- Music by: Etsuji Yamada
- Studio: Oh! Production
- Licensed by: NA: Discotek Media
- Released: August 23, 1988
- Runtime: 30 minutes
- Anime television series

Tokyo Pig
- Directed by: Shinichi Watanabe
- Produced by: Keisuke Iwata
- Written by: Yoshio Urasawa
- Music by: Toshio Masuda; TV Tokyo Music
- Studio: Group TAC; SPE Visual Works
- Licensed by: NA: Miramax Television Studio E Productions Buena Vista Sound Services
- Original network: TXN (TV Tokyo)
- English network: IN: Hungama TV; US: ABC Family (2002–2003)
- Original run: July 3, 1997 – September 29, 1998
- Episodes: 61

Fair, then Partly Piggy (はれときどきぶた, Hare Tokidoki Buta) is a picture book series written by Shiro Yadama. Some books were translated into English by Keith Holman. The book is about a boy named Noriyasu Hatakeyama who starts writing "tomorrow's" journal entries when he finds out the days start happening just the way he writes them.

A 30-minute animated film was created by Oh! Production and Gakken and released on August 23, 1988.

An animated television series animated by Group TAC aired on TV Tokyo from July 3, 1997, to September 29, 1998. It was rebroadcast on Tokyo MX from May 6, 2011, to July 29, 2011. When brought to the United States, it was renamed Tokyo Pig. The English dub of Tokyo Pig was produced by Miramax Television Studio E Productions and Buena Vista Sound Services and had all the original Japanese music completely replaced with a new musical score and all the original Japanese sound effects completely replaced with new American-made sound effects. It was also translated into Chinese and Tagalog (under the name Sunny Pig). It was broadcast from September 2002 to March 2003 in the United States on ABC Family, and eventually on Cartoon Network Korea in June 2013. It was originally directed by Shinichi Watanabe. Miramax Home Entertainment released Tokyo Pig only on one DVD with no VHS equivalent.

== Main characters ==
Noriyasu Hatakeyama (畠山 則安, Hatakeyama Noriyasu) / Spencer Weinberg-Takahama
Voiced by: Daisuke Namikawa (Film), Omi Minami (TV series) (Japanese); Joshua Seth (English)
Harebuta (はれぶた, Harebuta) / Sunny Pig
Voiced by: Mika Kanai (TV series)
Mama (ママ, Mama) / Mom
Voiced by: Rihoko Yoshida (Film), Naoko Matsui (TV series) (Japanese); Dorothy Elias-Fahn (English)
Papa (パパ, Papa) / Dad
Voiced by: Tesshō Genda (Film), Kiyoyuki Yanada (TV series) (Japanese); Wally Wingert (English)
Tama-chan (玉ちゃん, Tama-chan) / Dizzy Lizzy
Voiced by: Rei Sakuma (Film), Kurumi Mamiya (TV series) (Japanese); Colleen O'Shaughnessey (English)
Announcer Yadama (矢玉アナ, Yadama-ana) / The Weather Lady
Voiced by: Misa Watanabe (TV series) (Japanese); Diane Michelle (English)

== Other characters ==
Nabeshin (ナベシン, Nabeshin) / Angus
Voiced by: Hiro Yuki (Japanese); Jason Spisak (English)
Onigiriyama (おにぎり山, Onigiriyama) / Eggman
Voiced by: Wasabi Mizuta (Japanese); Mona Marshall (English)
Kimiyo Hiraga (平賀 きみよ, Hiraga Kimiyo) / Tiffany Van Hootenberg
Voiced by: Sumie Baba (Japanese); Brianne Siddall (English)
Koganei Musashi (武蔵小金井, Musashi Koganei) / Wigstaff
Voiced by: Yoku Shioya (Japanese); Jason Spisak (English)
Masako Sodefuri (袖振 マサコ, Sodefuri Masako) / Sweater Girl
Voiced by: Naoko Matsui (Japanese); Brianne Siddall (English)
Ms. Kazuko (和子先生, Kazuko-sensei) / Ms. Spelt
Voiced by: Yumi Takada (Film), Kotono Mitsuishi (TV series) (Japanese); Wendee Lee (English)
The Principal (校長先生, Kōchō-sensei) / Principal Tezuka
Voiced by: Naoki Tatsuta (Japanese); Neil Kaplan (English)
Black Yadama (黒矢玉, Kuro Yadama) / Shadow Lady

Yuroba Hirohi (広飛優老婆, Hirohi Yūrōba) / Mrs. Tingly a.k.a. Lady Fujian
Kurobuta (クロブタ, Kurobuta) / Dark Sunny
Voiced by: Nobutoshi Canna
Yamada-san (山田さん, Yamada-san) / Wenworth
Voiced by: Masako Nozawa
Snow Queen

== Music ==
Theme songs
Opening

1. "Tsuyokina Futari" (強気なふたり) by Yumi Yoshimura (Episodes 1–17)
2. "Karette Tokidoki Buta" (カレって時々ブタ) by TSUNAMi (Episodes 18–36)
3. "BOO~Onaka ga Karaku Hodo Warattemitai~" (BOO ～おなかが空くほど笑ってみたい～) by The Gospellers (37–61)

Ending

1. "I'm Home" (ただいま, Tadaima) by Ami Onuki (Episodes 1–17)
2. "Airplane Cloud" (ヒコーキ雲, Hikouki Kumo) by Flower Companies (Episodes 18–36)
3. "Ah Buta da! 〜Tsuitachi yu kai ni ikiru uta〜" by Delicious Pigs (Episodes 37–61)

== Crew ==
=== English crew ===
- Bob Weinstein, Harvey Weinstein - Executive producers
- Jamie Simone - Producer
- Barbara Schneeweiss, Sean McPhillips - Co-producers
- Steve Kramer - Voice director
- Michael Clark - ADR recordist
- Michael Sorich - Story editor
- Gustavo A. Pablik - Production manager
- Michael Wandmacher - Music
- Ron Salaises - Sound Editor
- Zoli Osaze, Taryn Simone - Foley artists
- Mark Ettel - Re-recording mixer
- Jeff Malmberg - Editor
- Denny Densmore - Post production supervisor
- Bob Osher - Executive in charge of production

== Picture books ==
No.	Title	Original release date	English release date
1	Fair, then Partly Piggy; Hare Tokidoki Buta (はれときどきぶた)	September 5, 1980; 4-26-591613-9	1986; 4-26-580038-6
2	Tomorrow is Pig Day! and Pig Time! Ashita Buta no Hi Buta Jikan (あしたぶたの日ぶたじかん)	July 29, 1985; 4-26-591628-7	1989; 4-26-580056-4
3	Sometimes I'm a Pig; Boku Tokidoki Buta (ぼくときどきぶた)	September 26, 1987; 4-26-591636-8	1989; 4-26-580057-2
4	My Digestable Manga; Boku Hesomade Manga (ぼくへそまでまんが)	September 28, 1990; 4-26-591653-8	-
5	Yumenbo from Dreams; Yume Kara Yumenbo (ゆめからゆめんぼ)	September 30, 1993; 4-26-591656-2	-
6	Moving and Moving; Hikkosu de Hikkosu (ヒッコスでひっこす)	January 17, 1996; 4-26-504126-4	-
7	Fair then Partly Squid; Hare Tokidoki Tako (はれときどきたこ)	September 30, 2002; 4-26-502840-3	-
8	Fair then Partly Ahaha; Hare Tokidoki Ahaha (はれときどきアハハ)	August 31, 2007; 4-26-582009-3	-
9	Fair then Partly Amanojaku; Hare Tokidoki Amanojaku (はれときどきあまのじゃく)	September 15, 2010; 4-26-582030-1	-
10	Fair Piglet Chance; Hare Tamatama Kobuta (はれたまたまこぶた)	July 11, 2013; 4-26-582040-9	-

== Episode list ==
Japanese no.	American no.	Title	Air date (Japan)	Air date (US)
1	1	"Pi-Pi-Pig Panic!" / "When Pigs Fly"; Transliteration: "Bū-Bū-Buta Panic!" (Japanese: ブーブーぶたパニック！)	July 3, 1997	September 14, 2002
Noriyasu Hatakeyama's world changes after he draws a sky full of pigs in his journal and Harebuta appears out of the clear blue sky. With it by his side, Noriyasu discovers he has the ability to make whatever he imagines come to life. Now, the duo embark on a new adventure each week as Noriyasu tries to keep his stray thoughts and careless scribbles in his journal from running wild and turning his life upside-down.
2	2	"Koganei Musashi-kun is Bad" / "Invasion of the Pig Clones"; Transliteration: "Musashi Koganei-kun wa Mazui" (Japanese: 武蔵小金井くんはまずい)	July 10, 1997	September 21, 2002
Noriyasu forgets his gym bag and his mom sends Harebuta to school to deliver it. When the two quickly become the center of attention at school, class nerd Koganei Musashi kidnaps Harebuta and downloads his brain into a supercomputer. With his own manufactured pig, he hopes to recapture the treasured "Weirdest Kid in School" title.
3	12	"Papa is a Cook From Hell!" / "Dad is the Worst Cook Ever"; Transliteration: "Papa wa Jigoku no Kokku-san!" (Japanese: パパは地獄のコックさん！)	July 17, 1997	November 30, 2002
Noriyasu's mom wins an all-expenses paid vacation and leaves the kids with their dad for the weekend. While thrilled at the chance to study undisturbed, he is not so happy about the prospect of eating his father's terrible cooking. Faced with a disgusting lizard stew, Noriyasu - with Harebuta's help - dreams up a way to derail his mother's trip and bring her back home.
4	10	"Summer! Pool! Principal!" / "Pigtoven vs. Principal"; Transliteration: "Natsu da! Pūru da! Kōchō da!" (Japanese: 夏だ！プールだ！校長だ！)	July 24, 1997	November 23, 2002
5	17	"The Chinese Madam is Yanyanyan" / "The Devil Lady Next Door"; Transliteration: "Chūka na Madamu ga Yanyayan" (Japanese: 中華なマダムがヤンヤヤン)	July 31, 1997	December 21, 2002
6	-	"Fearsome! The Curse of the Boiled Octopus"; Transliteration: "Kyōfu! Yudedako no Noroi" (Japanese: 恐怖！ゆでダコの呪い)	August 7, 1997	-
7	6	"Hectic Hometown" / "Tickled Pigs Feet"; Transliteration: "Tenyawanya no Satogaeri" (Japanese: てんやわんやの里帰り)	August 14, 1997	October 19, 2002
Noriyasu and his family go to visit his grandparents (who gave his Dad a job). But a picture from his Mom's past causes a fight between her and her folks. Noriyasu's attempts to stop the fighting ultimately lead him to wish for tickling aliens (the subject of a popular television show, "Space Ticklers") to come and tickle his family.
8	20	"The Shukushuku Beetle Assignment" / "Spencer Goes Buggy"; Transliteration: "Shukudai Shukushuku Kabutomushi" (Japanese: 宿題シュクシュクかぶと虫)	August 21, 1997	January 11, 2003
9	19	"Bu-Bu Rider is Here" / "Oinks from Outer Space"; Transliteration: "Bū-Bū Raidā ga Kita" (Japanese: ブーブーライダーが来た)	August 28, 1997	January 4, 2003
Noriyasu is stuck having to babysit Tama-chan, who is trying to shoot a movie. He ditches her to hang out with Nabeshin. Onigiriyama cannot join them because he is sick...or so he says. The two find out that Onigiriyama has been invited to a party at Kimiyo Hiraga's place, but it is a revenge party and Onigiriyama (because of his disgusting habits) is the guest of honor!
10	11	"The Princess's Achievement Up School?" / "20,000 Leagues Beneath a C+"; Transliteration: "Otohime-sama no Gakuryoku Appu Juku?" (Japanese: 乙姫様の学力アップ塾？)	September 4, 1997	November 24, 2002
11	-	"A Typhoon! Moving and Moving"; Transliteration: "Taifū da! Hikkosu de Hikkosu" (Japanese: 台風だ！ヒッコスで引越す)	November 6, 1997	-
12	-	"I Want to Get Married if Possible"; Transliteration: "Dekireba Kekkon Shitakatta" (Japanese: できれば結婚したかった)	September 18, 1997	-
13	8	"Let's Go! The Universe Nighter" / "Aliens" (a.k.a. "Little Aliens, Pig Trouble"); Transliteration: "Sore Ike! Dai Uchū Naitā" (Japanese: それいけ！大宇宙ナイター)	October 2, 1997	November 2, 2002
14	5	"Explosive Fight! Tears of the Sports Festival" / "Luck of the Draw"; Transliteration: "Faito Ippatsu! Namida no Undōkai" (Japanese: ファイト一発！涙の運動会)	October 9, 1997	October 12, 2002
Everyone in Noriyasu's class has to participate in a three-legged race taking place during the Sports Festival. Unfortunately, Noriyasu ends up paired with the creepy Masako Sodefuri. Noriyasu wants to be popular for a change, and when he discovers her reason for wanting to win (her parents promised her a red dress if she won), he agrees to help her.
15	23	"Pigs and Pigs and Pigs are Everywhere!" / "Pooped Out Pig"; Transliteration: "Furimukeba Buta Buta Buta!" (Japanese: ふりむけばブタぶたブタ！)	October 16, 1997	February 8, 2003
When Harebuta goes missing, it's up to Noriyasu to find his friend. However, this becomes difficult, as when he begins drawing "missing" posters in an attempt to locate the pig, the drawings come to life, sprouting numerous copies of Harebuta, which makes the search even more difficult.
16	25	"Wind in the Field of Cosmos" / "Milk of Amnesia"; Transliteration: "Kosumosu Hata no Kaze" (Japanese: コスモス畑の風)	October 23, 1997	February 22, 2003
17	26	"Princess Kaguya Tamageta Tama-chan" / "Moon Girl"; Transliteration: "Tama-chan Tamageta Kaguya Hime" (Japanese: 玉ちゃんタマゲタかぐや姫)	October 30, 1997	March 1, 2003
18	27	"Fierce Battle! Harebuta VS Kurobuta" / "Pouty Pig: Scourge of the Galaxy"; Transliteration: "Gekitō! Harebuta tai Kurobuta" (Japanese: 激闘！はれぶたVSクロブタ)	November 6, 1997	March 8, 2003
19	16	"Expressing Love For Weird Stuff" / "Lookout! It's A Cookout"; Transliteration: "Chō Getemono Yori Ai wo Komete" (Japanese: 超ゲテモノより愛をこめて)	November 13, 1997	December 15, 2002
20	9	"Announcer Yamada is in Love with Lightning!?" / "Trouble in Lightning Land"; Transliteration: "Yadama-ana wa Kaminari ga Osuki!?" (Japanese: 矢玉アナは雷がお好き！？)	November 20, 1997	November 16, 2002
While doing a report on the weather, Announcer Yamada is taken to the sky by a giant flash of thunder. Harebuta and Noriyasu go to the sky to save her and they find out how lightning is made in the first place.
21	-	"Ghost of Tonkatsu"; Transliteration: "Gōsuto obu Tonkatsu" (Japanese: ゴースト・オブ・トンカツ)	November 27, 1997	-
22	7	"Loose Socks and a Pierce" / "Veggie Power"; Transliteration: "Rūzu Sokkusu to Piasu" (Japanese: ルーズソックスとピアス)	December 4, 1997	October 26, 2002
23	-	"Wonder if Kogarashi Loves Cold Wintry Wind"; Transliteration: "Kogarashi Kogarashi Koi Kashira" (Japanese: 木枯らしこがらし恋かしら)	December 11, 1997	-
24	-	"Mama's Pleasant Prince"; Transliteration: "Mama no Gokigen Purinsu" (Japanese: ママのごきげんプリンス)	December 18, 1997	-
25	18	"The Silly Battle" / "Auld Lang Swine"; Transliteration: "Omedetai Tatakai" (Japanese: おめでたい戦い)	January 1, 1998	December 28, 2002
26	14	"Here is Kimiyo Hiraga" / "Pigs on Ice"; Transliteration: "Hiraga Kimiyo de Gozai Masho" (Japanese: 平賀きみよでございましょ)	January 8, 1998	December 8, 2002
Kimiyo invites Noriyasu and his friends to her house, which has an indoor skating rink. Due to some really bad skating (that's what happens when you skate upside-down), Kiniyo and Harebuta have accidentally switched bodies. After switching back, Kimiyo has a fit and orders an army to go after Noriyasu and co.
27	-	"A Dream of a Snowman that can Never Melt"; Transliteration: "Yukidaruma no Tokenai Yume" (Japanese: 雪だるまのとけない夢)	January 15, 1998	-
Noriyasu draws a picture of a magical world where it is always winter, neglecting to realize this will have an effect on the outside world. The next day, his mother tells him that the schools have been closed due to a winter storm. Noriyasu attempts to erase the drawing, but this fails to stop the weather. The entire town becomes encased in ice as the storm continues unchecked, and Harebuta and Noriyasu must find a way to stop the endless winter. With help from his friends, Noriyasu discovered the only way to fix the problem is to draw a picture of the town as it was before on the same page as the previous winter scene.
28	-	"We Are Good Friends"; Transliteration: "Oretachi wa Tomodachi da" (Japanese: おれたちは友だちだ)	January 22, 1998	-
29	-	"Fair then Partly Stomachache"; Transliteration: "Hare Tokidoki Haraita" (Japanese: はれときどきはらいた)	January 29, 1998	-
30	21	"The Sleeping Skeleton President" / "Bones"; Transliteration: "Nemureru Gaikotsu no Daitōryō" (Japanese: 眠れるガイコツの大統領)	February 5, 1998	January 25, 2003
There's a pink-haired girl next door, who is really a male skeleton, who tries to take over the world with fossils.
31	-	"2.14 Valentine Battle"; Transliteration: "Ni Jūyon Barentain Kessen" (Japanese: 2・14バレンタイン決戦)	February 12, 1998	-
32	13	"Snow Lady - The Fire of Love Burns" / "A Trip to the Slopes"; Transliteration: "Yuki Onna - Koi no Honō de Achichi no Chi" (Japanese: 雪女・恋の炎でアチチのチ)	February 19, 1998	December 7, 2002
Noriyasu and his family decides to take a trip to a ski mountain, but the ski mountain has no snow because the Snow Queen of the Mountain left to Hawaii to find her true love. Now Noriyasu and Harebuta go to Hawaii to convince her to return.
33	-	"The Cowardly Armor"; Transliteration: "Yowamushi na Yoroikabuto" (Japanese: 弱虫なよろいかぶと)	March 5, 1998	-
34	-	"The Old Man of Winter and the Spirit of Spring"; Transliteration: "Fuyu no Oji-san to Haru no Yōsei" (Japanese: 冬のおじさんと春の妖精)	March 12, 1998	-
35	-	"Uncle and Vegetables and a Machine Gun"; Transliteration: "Oyaji to Yasai to Mashin Gan" (Japanese: おやじと野菜とマシンガン)	March 19, 1998	-
36	-	"Wasted Muscle"; Transliteration: "Mudana Kinnikushitsu" (Japanese: ムダな筋肉質)	April 7, 1998	-
37	-	"Sakura! Treasure! UFO!"; Transliteration: "Sakura da! Takara da! Yū Efu Ō da!" (Japanese: 桜だ！宝だ！UFOだ！)	April 14, 1998	-
38	3	"An 100% Natural" / "A Bitter Fruit"; Transliteration: "Tennen Hyaku Pāsento Haitennen" (Japanese: 天然100%入ってんねん)	April 21, 1998	September 28, 2002
Noriyasu reaches into the refrigerator for a banana and is transported with Harebuta to Fruit-Land (inside the refrigerator) where they accidentally overhear the evil strawberries' secret plan to make the other fruit less edible.
39	-	"Cho's Repayment"; Transliteration: "Ongaeshishite Chō" (Japanese: 恩返ししてチョー)	April 28, 1998	-
40	22	"The Story of the Fish that Cannot Fly - Pure Heart Chapter" / "Kite-Flying for Dummies"; Transliteration: "Tobenai Koi no Monogatari - Junjō-hen" (Japanese: 飛べない鯉の物語・純情篇)	May 5, 1998	February 1, 2003
41	-	"Ah Despair! The Nose Can't Breathe"; Transliteration: "Ā Zetsubō! Suenai Hana" (Japanese: ああ絶望！吸えない鼻)	May 12, 1998	-
42	-	"Ah Hope! The Nose Can Breathe"; Transliteration: "Ā Kibō! Sueru Hana" (Japanese: ああ希望！吸える鼻)	May 19, 1998	-
43	-	"Pizza Girl's First Love Delivery"; Transliteration: "Piza Shōjo no Hatsu Koi Deribarī" (Japanese: ピザ少女の初恋デリバリー)	May 26, 1998	-
44	-	"Side Story: The River in the Sunny Day"; Transliteration: "Gaiden: Ware Tokidoki Ōedo" (Japanese: 外伝・はれときどき大江戸)	June 2, 1998	-
45	4	"Oh My Where Did the School Go?" / "The Incredible Shrinking School"; Transliteration: "Ō Mai Gakkō Dokoyatta?" (Japanese: オーマイ学校どこ行った?)	June 9, 1998	October 5, 2002
Afraid that his family will embarrass him at the school's upcoming Parent-Teacher Night, Noriyasu comes up with an idea: a snail can shrink the school to force the event to be cancelled. He decides to sleep on it, needing to think about the details. Unfortunately, Harebuta draws the snail who goes on to shrink the school. Things are all right, until he realizes he can't play with his classmates and two friends, Nabeshin and Onigiriyama. Now Noriyasu must figure out a way to bring back the school, which still has the principal and Miss Kazuko trapped inside!
46	-	"A Frog has been Married!"; Transliteration: "Kekkonshite Kerōtsu!" (Japanese: 結婚してケローッ！)	June 16, 1998	-
47	-	"The Demon Made it Rain Today"; Transliteration: "Makai wa Kyō mo Amedatta" (Japanese: 魔界は今日も雨だった)	June 23, 1998	-
48	15	"I Love School Lunches" / "Samurai Lunch Lady"; Transliteration: "Watashi wa Kyūshoku ga Suki Desu" (Japanese: わたしは給食が好きです)	June 30, 1998	December 14, 2002
Samurai Lunch Lady is there to protect every kid from bad lunches, but when Homemade Woman arrives with some competition, Harebuta has to so something about it.
49	-	"Mother is the King of the Jungle"; Transliteration: "Ōka-san wa Janguru no Ōya" (Japanese: 大家さんはジャングルの王や)	July 7, 1998	-
50	-	"Revolving Hell - The Warriors Long Ago"; Transliteration: "Kaiten Jigoku - Mukashi Mukashi Sono Musashi" (Japanese: 回転地獄・昔々その武蔵)	July 14, 1998	-
51	28	"Sammer Looks at the Summer Disappear" / "Bummer Vacation"; Transliteration: "Kiero Samā de Zamā Miro" (Japanese: 消えろサマーでザマー見ろ)	July 21, 1998	March 22, 2003
When summer vacation is almost here Noriyasu is excited, but the Principal has a plan to get rid of summer vacation for good. Can Noriyasu and Harebuta stop the Principal in time?
52	-	"Pong's Summer Night Fireworks!"; Transliteration: "Manatsu no Yoru no Hanabida Pon!" (Japanese: 真夏の夜の花火だポン！)	July 28, 1998	-
53	24	"The Story of the Decent Dinosaur's Stomach" / "The Lovesick Castaway"; Transliteration: "Kyōryū no Onaka no Naka no Ee Hanashi" (Japanese: 恐竜のおなかの中のええ話)	August 4, 1998	February 15, 2003
While vacationing at the beach, Noriyasu ends up on a deserted island, where he meets an old sea captain who lost his brother and the love of his life to a sea monster.
54	-	"Insufficient Calcium for the Bones"; Transliteration: "Gaikotsu no Karushiumu Fusoku" (Japanese: ガイコツのカルシウム不足)	August 11, 1998	-
55	-	"Dream of an America Lobster"; Transliteration: "America Zarigani no Yume" (Japanese: A-ザリガニの夢)	August 18, 1998	-
56	-	"Yasunori-kun is a Square Head! Who's That?"; Transliteration: "Yasunori-kun wa Kakugashira! Tte Dare?" (Japanese: 安則君は角頭！って誰？)	August 25, 1998	-
57	-	"Weight Loss Diet"; Transliteration: "Omoide Futori no Daietto" (Japanese: 思い出太りのダイエット)	September 1, 1998	-
57	-	"Oh Scream! Musical Story"; Transliteration: "A~a Zekkyō! Myūjikaru-banashi" (Japanese: あぁ絶叫!ミュージカル話)	September 1, 1998	-
58	-	"Meet! The Pig's Mama"; Transliteration: "Atsu! Buta Mama da" (Japanese: あッ！ぶたママだ)	September 8, 1998	-
59	-	"Fair and Partly Swelling"; Transliteration: "Hare Tokidoki wo Wakare" (Japanese: はれときどきお別れ)	September 15, 1998	-
60	-	"Fair then Parting Journey"; Transliteration: "Hare Tokidoki Tabidachi" (Japanese: はれときどき旅立ち)	September 22, 1998	-
61	-	"Fair then..." Transliteration: "Hare Tokidoki..." (Japanese: はれときどき…)	September 29, 1998	-

== Bibliography ==
- Yadama, Shiro (1986). Fair, then Partly Piggy. Translated by Keith Holeman. Tokyo: Iwasaki Shoten. ISBN 4-265-80038-6. - NDC913

Preceded by Mach GoGoGo (1/9/1997 - 6/19/1997)	TV Tokyo Thursday 19:00 Timeframe; Fair then Partly Piggy (July 3, 1997 - March 19, 1998)	Succeeded by Pocket Monsters (4/16/1998 - 11/14/2002)

Preceded by Classroom King Yamazaki (12/23/1997 - 3/31/1998)	TV Tokyo Tuesday 18:30 Timeframe; Fair then Partly Piggy (April 7, 1998 - September 29, 1998)	Succeeded by Super Doll Licca-chan (10/6/1998 - 9/28/1999)
