= Akiko Kinouchi =

Japanese actress (born 1981)

- 木内 晶子
- Born: 2 September 1981 (age 45); Takamatsu, Kagawa, Japan
- Other name: nanami
- Occupations: Actress; singer
- Years active: 1998–present
- Agent: nanami office
- Notable work: Bayside Shakedown: The Movie; GTO
- Television: Pu-Pu-Pu-; Hamidashi Keiji Jōnetsukei; Joi Yū: Aozora Clinic; Sand Chronicles
- Awards: "1st The Japan Audition" passed
- Website: Akiko Kinouchi Official Web Site

Akiko Kinouchi (木内 晶子, Kinouchi Akiko; born 2 September 1981, in Takamatsu, Kagawa) is a Japanese actress who has appeared in a number of feature films, television series and variety shows. She is also a singer under the name Nanami. She is represented by the agency Nanami office.

== Filmography ==
=== TV dramas ===
Dates	Title	Role	Network	Notes
9 Oct – 18 Dec 1998	Pu-Pu-Pu-	Mahiru Yamaguchi	TBS	
9 Apr – 25 Jun 1999	L×I×V×E	Rikiko Taira	TBS	
11 Oct 1999 – 27 Mar 2000	Gamble Queen	Ai Takakura	CX	
24 Dec 1999	Keizoku/Tokubetsu-hen	Misaki Takasei	TBS	
Jan–Dec 2000	Taiga drama Aoi Tokugawa Sandai	Jishōin (Tokugawa Iemitsu's concubine)	NHK	
4 Aug 2000	Mago	Satoko Koizumi	CX	
Jan 2001	Drama D Mode Good Combination	Azusa Fujiwara	NHK G, NHK Satellite 2nd	
26 Feb 2001	Hero	Junko Manyama	CX	Episode 8
7 Apr – 20 Oct 2001	Buchō Keiji Series Shin Mai.	Hikaru Sawaguchi	ABC	Lead role
11 Jul – 26 Sep 2001	D-girls Idol Tantei Sanshimai Monogatari	Kurumi Sakuragi	TX	
3 Oct 2001 – 27 Mar 2002	Hamidashi Keiji Jōnetsukei 6	Miyuki Negishi	EX	
10 Apr – 26 Jun 2002	Wedding Planner: Sweet Delivery	Nana Naba	CX	
29 Aug – 19 Sep 2002	Renai Hensa-chi	Kyoko Ito	CX	Chapter 3 "Her Girlfriend"
16 Nov 2002	Remote	Suzu Wakana	NTV	Episode 6
8 Jan – 19 Mar 2003	Hamidashi Keiji Jōnetsukei 7	Miyuki Negishi	EX	
Mar–May 2003	NHK Yoru no Renzoku Drama Okami ni narimasu!	Aya Yabe	NHK	Episode 1
1 May, 19 Jun 2003	Anata no Jinsei Ohakobi shimasu!	Kana Ariyoshi	TBS	Episode 4, Final Episode
28 Jul 2003	Getsuyō Drama Series Quill	Ayumi Sawaki	NHK	Final Episode
25 Aug 2003	Kokuhatsu Bengoshi Series 5 Bengoshi Bunsuke Igari -Futatsu no Igonsho-	Kanako Miyamoto	TBS	
Sep 2003 – Mar 2004	Asadora Teruteru Kazoku	Asako Tachikawa	NHK	
8 Nov 2003	Commemorating the 45th Anniversary of the Opening Hōigaku Kyōshitsu no Jiken File 18	Shoko Tateishi	EX	
20 Mar 2004	Honto ni atta Kowai Hanashi	Keiko Misaki	CX	Final Episode "Ghost Apartment"; lead role
10 Apr 2004	Muta Criminal Case File 31	Mariko Sawabe	EX	
14 Apr – 30 Jun 2004	Hamidashi Keiji Jōnetsukei 8	Miyuki Negishi	EX	
2004	Himawari-san: Ishitsubutsugakari o Meizu!	Nami Oyamada	TBS	
28 Jun – 24 Sep 2004	Joi Yū: Aozora Clinic	Yu Fujii	THK, TX	Lead role
5 Oct – 14 Dec 2004	Medaka	Tadaya Kawashima	CX	
28 Dec 2004	Year-end Period Drama Special Project Tokugawa Tsunayoshi: Inu to Yoba reta Otoko	Okon	CX	
22 Jul 2005	Dai Kūkō Keisatsu Fuku Shochō: Tadashijiro Higurashi Hashiru	Satsuki Ishiguro	CX	
4 Sep 2005	Koisuru Nichiyōbi	Yuri	BS-TBS	Second Series "Tokyo Tower"
14 Oct–16 Dec 2005	One Missed Call	Misato Okano	EX	
11 Jan 2006	Yasuo Uchida Suspense Shinano no Colombo Jiken File 10	Mariko Ikeno	TX	
3 Mar 2006	Kinyō Drama Yaoh	Shoko Toyama	TBS	Episode 8
31 May 2006	Mikkai no Yado 5: Murder case of Adulitz Alumni Association	Tomoe Takashima	TX	
17 Jun 2006	Honō no Keibi Taichō Morio Igarashi 4	Saori Tachibana	EX	
3 Jul – 29 Sep 2006	Utsukushī Wana	Mio Kishino	THK	
8 Jul 2006	Shinsenchō no Kōkai Jiken Nisshi	Hotaru Wada	EX	
3 Nov 2006	Anna-san no omame	Honoka Getto	EX	Episode 4
15 Nov 2006	Tetsudō Keisatsukan Kozaburo Kiyomura 3: Kurobe Kyōkoku Torokko Tour Satsujin Jiken	Ikumi Tanihama	TX	
5–9 Feb 2007	Koihana: Hana no Koi Monogatari	Hana	EX	
20 Apr – 1 Jun 2007	Ai no Gekijō Sand Chronicles	Shikisuka Tsukishima	TBS	
1 May 2007	Oniyome Nikki: Īyudana	Keiko	KTV	Episode 3
17 Aug 2007	Friday Period Drama A Thug User		TX	Episode 5
1 Oct 2007	Aki no Tokubetsu Suspense Zeimu Chōsakan Taro Madogiwa no Jiken-bo 16	Miyuki Kuwata	TBS	
2 Jan 2008	Shinshun Wide Jidaigeki Tokugawa Fūunroku Hachidai Shōgun Yoshimune	Masanomiya Masako (Tokugawa Yoshimune's Seishitsu)	TX	
9 Jun 2008	Mito Kōmon	Okimi	TBS	Part 38 Episode 21 "Father is Coming Back! Here is Shimoda, Shimoda"
	Kinyō Night Drama			
25 Jul–5 Sep 2008	Dageki Tenshi Ruri	Rina Minakami	EX	
27 Jan – 20 Feb 2009	Ai no Gekijō 40th Anniversary Program Love Letter	Mayumi Iwamura	TBS	
8 Mar 2009	The 45th Anniversary Campaign "Kizuna" Soratobu ribon	Kayama (nurse)	TX	
1 Jun 2009	Nijūsaiban	Michiko Nitta	TBS	
9 Nov 2009	Mito Kōmon	Akane Tachibana	TBS	Part 40 Episode 14 "Seven Changes of Glossy Omen! Toyama"
2 Jun 2010	Mother		NTV	
4 Sep 2010	Jinrui Gakusha Kumiko Misaki no Satsujin Kantei	Kika Takatori	EX	
13 Sep – 25 Oct 2011	Last Money: Ai no Nedan	Kari Mizutani	NHK	
3 Dec 2011	ABC 60th Anniversary of Foundation Special Drama Kyōgū	Hitomi Takamatsu	ABC	
5 Dec 2011	Mito Kōmon	Kotae	TBS	Part 43 Episode 20 "Who's the Traitor?! Nikko"
21 Apr 2012	Mystery Sakka Ikki Rokuhara no Suiri 2	Riko Domeno	ABC	
23 Mar 2013	Gyakuten Hōdō no Onna 2	Akina Chikada	ABC	
8 Nov 2013	Medical Investigator: Mr. Kazuichi Noguchi 4	Naomi Yamane	CX	
7 Feb 2014	Gekai: Shugoro Hatomura 12	Kyoko Kamakura	CX	
8 Oct 2014	Sasurai Shochō Shohei Kazama 11: Miyagi Matsushimawan Satsujin Jiken	Misaki Nanao	TX	
20 Dec 2014	Yame Ken no Onna 5	Aya Ihara	ABC	
21, 28 Feb 2015	Rugged!		NHK BS Premium	

=== Variety ===
Dates	Title	Network	Notes
22 Oct 2002	Dancing Sanma Palace	NTV	
17, 24 Feb 2003	Ima Nani-machi?	CX	
16 Jan 2004	Gurutto Kansai ohiruma e	NHK Osaka Broadcaster	
13 Jul 2004	Kōtarō Lab	CX	
17 Aug 2005	Soratobu Gūtan: Jibunsagashi Variety	CX	
31 Mar, 7 Apr, 12 May, 11 Aug 2006	Koisuru Hanikami	TBS	
19 Jun 2006	Geikoi Real	YTV	
16 Feb 2007	The Kotaro	CX	
30 Dec 2007	Inaka ni Tomarō! SP	TX	
21 Sep 2008	Inaka ni Tomarō! Aki no 3-jikan Special	TX	
1 Mar 2009	Inaka ni Tomarō!	TX	
18 Aug 2013	Nihon! Shoku Kikō	EX	Narration

=== Films ===
Date	Title	Role	Distributor	Director	Notes
1998	Bayside Shakedown: The Movie	Waitress		Katsuyuki Motohiro	
1999	GTO: The Movie	Kanako Fujisaki	Toei Company	Masayuki Suzuki	
2002	Aiki	Chika	Nikkatsu	Daisuke Tengan	
2003	13 Kaidan	Yuri Kinoshita	Toho	Masahiko Nagasawa	
2003	Raihō-sha	Yuuko Arikawa	Livedoor	Naka Oikawa	Lead role
2004	Koibito wa Sinper: Gekijō-ban	Tomoyo Sugawara	Toei Company	Junji Meguruma	
2005	Yōgi-sha: Shinji Muroi	Kyoko Sakurai		Ryoichi Kimizuka	
Oct 2006	Other Life	Aoi Osugi	D Square Pictures	Yoshihiro Akaike	
20 Oct 2012	Hyaku-nen no Tokei	Misaki Ando	Blue Cowboys	Shusuke Kaneko	Released in Kagawa Prefecture
Feb 2014	Mangetsu no Parade				

==== Sanuki Film Festival Planning Films ====
Date	Title	Role	Director	Notes	Ref.
Apr 2010	Meon Episode 2	Naoko	Seiji Nomura	Distributed by Bobos; lead role	
17 Feb 2015	W&M	Yuko Kitayama's older sister	Kako Umeki	Cameo; released on 2015 Sanuki Film Festival	
16 Feb 2016	Kankan sun	Nao Fujimura	Midori Kiyama	Cameo; released on 2016 Sanuki Film Festival	

=== Radio ===
Dates	Title	Network	Notes
4–8, 11–15 Apr 2011	Seishun Adventurer "Kotori Diary"	NHK-FM	
2014, 2015	Radio Charity Musicthon	RNC Radio	Main personality
2 Apr 2017	Sun San Kagawa Plus	OHK	

=== Others ===
Dates	Title	Role	Location	Notes	Ref.
Jul 2010	Himitsu no Kankei: Sensei wa Dōkyo Hito	Announcer		Released on NTT DoCoMo BeeTV	
Oct 2011 –	Udon-ken	Signboard girl of tea houses at Rurin Park	Kagawa Prefecture	PR in Kagawa Prefecture; Udon prefectural deputy governor	
21 Aug 2016	Yuki Seguchi & Hayato Furumura Summer Festival Lunch Show		Himi Ayoyama Garden	Special guest	
21 Aug 2016	Debut 10th Anniversary Hayato Furumura Talk & Live -I Hear the Wind Tray Love Song-		Hotel New Otani Takaoka	Special guest	
21 Feb 2017	Akiko Kinouchi Talk Show Udon Prefectural Vice Governor Talks "Secret of Beauty"			Mitsukoshi Takamatsu	

=== Advertisements ===
Product	Notes
Circle K Sunkus	
Hitachi Maxell	
The Hyakujushi Bank	
Suntory "Gomen ne.", "Diet Nama"	
Aderans "Keitai de Hair Check"	Co-starred with Yoiko's Masaru Hamaguchi
Eisai "Chocola BB Pure"	
Oji Nepia "Funwari Slim"	
Nissin Foods "Chazuke Noodle"	
Rohto Pharmaceutical "Algard Series"	
Acom	

== Bibliography ==
Date	Title	Publisher	Notes
2001	Akiko Kinouchi Shashin-shū Suishō	Kadokawa Shoten	First photo album
26 Aug 2002	Shincho Mook Gekkan: Akiko Kinouchi	Shinchosha	

== DVD ==
Date	Title	Publisher
17 Mar 2000	Akiko Kinouchi Venus in Paradice	Pony Canyon
23 Jan 2002	Akiko Kinouchi Akiko Kinouchi no Gokushiteki Koi Monogatari	Tokuma Japan Corporation
22 Feb 2002	Akiko Kinouchi Akiko Kinouchi no Gokushiteki Kyūjitsu	Tokuma Japan Corporation

== Discography ==
Title	Lyrics	Composition	Presentation year	Remarks	Ref.
Yakusoku no Sakura	Seiji Nomura	Satoshi Nakamori	2011	Singing in the name nanami; Insert song of film Meon	
Ikanai de natsu			2011	Singing in the name nanami	
Kaze no Nomad			2014	Singing in the name nanami	
Futari Jikan	Ersuko Kisugi	Isao Hirami	2015	Singing in the name nanami; Theme song of Yoru be shiru be	
