= Sand Chronicles =

Japanese manga series by Hinako Ashihara

- The cover of the first Japanese manga volume, featuring Daigo (left) and Ann (right)

砂時計 (Sunadokei)
- Genre: Drama, romance
- Manga
- Written by: Hinako Ashihara
- Published by: Shogakukan
- English publisher: NA: Viz Media
- Imprint: Flower Comics
- Magazine: Betsucomi
- English magazine: NA: Shojo Beat
- Original run: April 2003 – June 2006
- Volumes: 10
- Television drama
- Written by: Yuki Takeda; Kiyomi Fujii; Masahiro Yamaura
- Music by: Koji Endō
- Original network: TBS
- Original run: March 12 – June 1, 2007
- Episodes: 60
- Live-action film
- Directed by: Shinsuke Sato
- Produced by: Kazuya Hamana
- Written by: Shinsuke Sato
- Released: April 26, 2008

Sand Chronicles (Japanese: 砂時計, Hepburn: Sunadokei; lit. "Hourglass") is a Japanese manga series written and illustrated by Hinako Ashihara. It was serialized in Shogakukan's Betsucomi magazine from the May 2003 issue (released in April) to the July 2006 issue (released in June). Shogakukan collected the individual chapters into 10 bound volumes from August 2003 to August 2006. The series won the 50th Shogakukan Manga Award in the shōjo category in 2005.

Viz Media licensed the manga for an English-language release in North America, first serialized in their Shojo Beat magazine in 2007 and later published in ten print volumes from January 2008 to January 2011. The manga is also licensed by Kana in France and by Planet Manga in Germany.

In 2007, Sand Chronicles inspired a live-action Japanese television drama series which aired during the half-hour Love Theatre time-slot on TBS. In 2008, the manga was adapted into a live-action Japanese feature film directed by Shinsuke Sato, starring Kaho and Nao Matsushita as the main character Ann during different stages of her life.

== Plot ==
Twelve-year-old Ann Uekusa and her mother move to the small town of Shimane, where Ann's grandparents live and everyone seems to be familiar with everyone else. Ann soon becomes friends with Daigo, a young boy who lives in Shimane, as well as Fuji and Shika, Fuji's younger sister and her best friend in Shimane.

When Ann's mother, Miwako, commits suicide, Daigo helps Ann cope with the sudden change in her life. They fall in love, but Ann's life can only become more complicated when her estranged father suddenly arrives from Tokyo. After greatly contemplating going to Tokyo to live with her father after he asks her, she decides to stay. Ann tells Daigo about her decision but makes her go anyway. Ann and Fuji both live in Tokyo but hardly ever talk because Fuji goes to an elite high school, K High. Ann reunites with the friends she had before moving to Shimane and they continue their friendships. In Tokyo, she ends up becoming closer to Fuji, which causes conflict between her and Daigo.

In Shimane, Shika learns the truth about her parentage; in her confusion, she begins to fall in love with Daigo. When Ann returns to Shimane, Shika upsets Ann's fragile emotional state so that Ann and Daigo will break up. In the end, Ann breaks up with Daigo for fear that her own sadness will weigh him down. Ann returns to Tokyo and starts a relationship with Fuji; however, because she does not love him, the relationship does not last. Daigo refuses Shika and rumors begin to circulate that he is interested in his middle school classmate Ayumu, who has been helping him studying to get into university and become a teacher.

Nearing graduation, Ann learns that her father and his friend Kaede Kuroki have been dating and she is pregnant with Ann's half-sister.

After attending her middle school reunion, Ann spends some time with Daigo, where he tells her to find her own happiness. Six years later, Ann meets a young businessman named Keiichiro Sakura and they become engaged shortly after. After Ann learns that he only uses people for his own gain, she confronts him about his insensitivity, but he is disappointed in her and breaks off the engagement. Almost a week afterward, she takes a train to Okayama, where Daigo teaches elementary school. Ann's grandmother, meanwhile, believes Ann will suffer the same fate as her mother. After a suicide attempt on the beach, Ann is taken to the hospital and later meets Daigo, who asks her to marry him. She says yes, and at the very end, the two are shown to be happily married with an infant son named Ryo. Meanwhile, Fuji decides to marry his cousin Mariko (against his family's wishes) and Shiika decides to work for her uncle in America.

== Characters ==
Ann Uekusa (植草 杏, Uekusa An), Ann Minase (水瀬 杏, Minase An)
Drama actresses: Megumi Satō, Ryoko Kobayashi (middle school), Karen Miyama (young girl)
The protagonist of the story. An affectionate, sensitive girl who likes to be silly sometimes, Ann cares deeply for all her friends. After her mother's death, she and Daigo become very close and she wishes to be able to stay with Daigo for the rest of her life. However, she chooses to return to Tokyo to live with her estranged father after he comes to see her in Shimane. Ann breaks up with Daigo during high school, but the two later reconnect as adults.
Daigo Kitamura (北村 大悟, Kitamura Daigo)
Drama actors: Terunosuke Takezai, Kazuma Sano (middle school), and Yuki Izumisawa (young boy)
Ann's first friend when she comes to Shimane, Daigo is very athletic and is not very articulate. He and Ann eventually fall in love and begin a relationship, which then becomes a long-distance relationship when she leaves Shimane for Tokyo. They break up when Ann feels she is becoming too much of a burden to him, but reconnect during adulthood. His mother is a down-to-earth woman who was best friends with Ann's mother.
Fuji Tsukishima (月島 藤, Tsukishima Fuji)
Drama actors: Jōji Shibue, Ruito Aoyagi (middle school), and Shōhei Kawaguchi (young boy)
Shiika's older brother, Fuji comes from a well-off family. He is the same age as Ann and Daigo and has a secret crush on Ann, which he eventually reveals to her. Fuji tends to keep to himself and eventually decides to attend high school in Tokyo shortly before Ann leaves Shimane. He has doubts concerning who he is because it is suspected that Fuji is not his father's biological son (though his father has accepted him as such), but the son of one of his mother's affairs. It is revealed eventually that he was not born from the affair, though it remains the reason why his mother does not treat him the same as his younger sister.
Shiika Tsukishima (月島 椎香, Tsukishima Shiika)
Drama actresses: Akiko Kinouchi, Ayami Kakiuchi (middle school), and Nana Yamauchi (young girl)
Ann's best friend in Shimane and perhaps her only best friend growing up. Though her mother is kind and loyal to her children, Shiika does not get along with her well. She is one year younger than Ann. It is revealed through a letter written by her mother to a lover that she, rather than Fuji, is the child of one of her mother's affairs. The reason that her mother pays more attention to her and pushes her so hard it is out of guilt of the affair.
Misayo Uekusa (植草 美佐代, Uekusa Misayo)
Ann's grandmother, the mother of Miwako (美和子). Though she is strict, she wants the best for Ann and cares for her. When Miwako commits suicide and leaves Ann in the care of her parents, Misayo believes that she had been too insensitive to Miwako, but was unable to bear seeing her daughter so depressed and blames herself for Miwako's weakness.
Masahiro Minase (水瀬 正弘, Minase Masahiro)
Ann's father. Miwako partially married Masahiro in order to leave Shimane, because she was too sensitive to bear how everyone in her town gossiped about one another so easily. They moved to Tokyo after marrying, but when Ann's father ended up deeply in debt during Ann's childhood, Miwako divorced him. A year after Miwako's suicide, he comes to Shimane and offers to care for Ann should she choose to return to Tokyo. He cares deeply for his family and worked very hard to clear his debts before he approached them again. He calls upon Ann to live with him in Tokyo because he promises the debts are soon over. Ann moves in with him for high school.
Ayumu Narasaki (長崎 歩, Narasaki Ayumu)
Ann's childhood rival, who resorted to trickery in an attempt to win Daigo's affections. Her schemes fail to work, instead bringing Ann and Daigo closer together. Several years later, Ayumu and her family move back to Shimane and meet up with Daigo after Daigo plays soccer with her little brother. After her return, Ayumu tutors Daigo in order to support him as he aims to become a grade school teacher. As Ayumu and Daigo become friends, their peers begin to speculate groundlessly that they have romantic feelings for one another.
Kaede Kuroki (黒木 楓, Kuroki Kaede)
Masahiro's new wife and Ann's stepmother. She stated that she had been in love with Ann's father since high school, although he was completely unaware of her feelings until many years later. In volume 7, she gives birth to Ann's half-sister, Chii (千衣).
