= Dragon Ball Daima =

Japanese anime television series

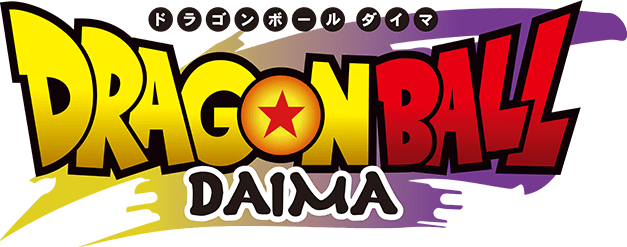
- ドラゴンボールDAIMA; Doragon Bōru Daima
- Genre: Adventure; Fantasy comedy; Martial arts
- Based on: Dragon Ball by Akira Toriyama (Note: While based on the manga, the series serves as an anime-exclusive midquel and does not adapt any published material. However, Toriyama was heavily involved in the production of Daima.)
- Screenplay by: Yūko Kakihara
- Story by: Akira Toriyama
- Directed by: Yoshitaka Yashima (Note: Director); Aya Komaki (Note: Series Director)
- Voices of: Masako Nozawa; Shinichiro Ohta; Koki Uchiyama; Fairouz Ai; Showtaro Morikubo; Junya Enoki
- Music by: Kosuke Yamashita
- Opening theme: "Jaka Jaan" by Zedd and C&K
- Ending theme: "Nakama" by Zedd and Ai
- Country of origin: Japan
- Original language: Japanese
- No. of episodes: 20

Production
- Executive producers: Hiroki Koyama; Kei Naitō
- Producers: Taku Hirokawa; Mamoru Kunihiro
- Cinematography: Naoyuki Wada
- Editor: Honami Yamagishi
- Running time: 32 minutes (#1); 23 minutes
- Production company: Toei Animation

Original release
- Network: Fuji Television
- Release: October 11, 2024 – February 28, 2025

Related
- List of all Dragon Ball series; List of all Dragon Ball films

Dragon Ball Daima (Japanese: ドラゴンボールDAIMA, Hepburn: Doragon Bōru Daima), stylized as Dragon Ball DAIMA, is a Japanese anime television series produced by Toei Animation. It is the sixth televised animated installment in the Dragon Ball media franchise, and the second and last to have a story directly conceived for it by franchise creator Akira Toriyama, who died shortly before its release in March 2024. Featuring a side story set after the events of the Majin Buu Saga from Dragon Ball Z but before its subsequent 10-year timeskip, the series aired in Japan on Fuji Television and its FNS affiliates from October 2024 to February 2025.

== Summary ==
One year after the defeat of Kid Buu and the death of Dabura in Dragon Ball Z, Gomah (ゴマー, Gomā), the new Supreme King of the Demon Realm, kidnaps Dende and uses the Dragon Balls from Earth to turn Son Goku and his friends into younger versions of themselves so that they are no longer potential threats to his reign. Goku, Shin, Vegeta, Piccolo, and Bulma are aided by the demons Glorio (グロリオ, Gurorio) and Panzy (パンジ, Panji) and later by the elderly Namekian Neva (ネバ, Neba) as they journey through the three worlds of the Demon Realm to gather its native Dragon Balls, revert Gomah's wish, and rescue Dende.

== Voice cast ==
Character	Japanese	English
Son Goku	Masako Nozawa	Stephanie Nadolny (mini); Sean Schemmel (adult)
Supreme Kai	Yumiko Kobayashi (mini); Shinichiro Ohta (adult)	Nia Celeste (mini); Kent Williams (adult)
Glorio	Koki Uchiyama	Aaron Dismuke
Panzy	Fairouz Ai	Veronica Laux
Gomah	Showtaro Morikubo	Tom Laflin
Degesu	Junya Enoki	Landon McDonald
Dr. Arinsu	Yoko Hikasa	Morgan Garrett
Vegeta	Yudai Mino (mini); Ryō Horikawa (adult)	Paul Castro Jr. (mini); Christopher Sabat (adult)
Piccolo	Tomohiro Yamaguchi (mini); Toshio Furukawa (adult)	Nasim Benelkour (mini)
Bulma	Mai Nakahara (mini); Aya Hisakawa (adult)	Taylor Murphy (mini); Monica Rial (adult)
Krillin	Aki Kanada (mini); Mayumi Tanaka (adult)	Lara Woodhull (mini); Sonny Strait (adult)
Chi-Chi	Ai Kakuma (mini)	Brittany Lauda (mini)
Master Roshi	Nobuaki Kanemitsu (mini)	Jordan Dash Cruz (mini)
Trunks	Tsubasa Yonaga (mini); Takeshi Kusao (kid)	Celeste Perez (mini); Alexis Tipton (kid)
Son Goten	Masako Nozawa	Kara Edwards
Dende	Erina Goto (mini); Aya Hirano (grown)	Emi Lo (mini); Justin Cook (grown)
Mr. Satan	Toru Sakurai (mini)	Cory J. Phillips (mini)
Mr. Popo	Kimiko Saitō (mini); Yasuhiko Kawazu (adult)	Trisha Mellon (mini); Chris Cason (adult)
Kibito	Yusuke Handa (mini); Shin Aomori (adult)	Aaron Michael (mini); Chuck Huber (adult)
Majin Buu	Shiho Amuro (mini); Kōzō Shioya (grown)	Dusty Feeney (mini); Josh Martin (grown)
Yamcha	Ryōta Suzuki	Christopher Sabat
Neva	Hiroshi Naka	Garrett Schenck
Korin	Ken Uo	Christopher Sabat
Majin Kuu	Tomokazu Seki	Gerard Caster
Majin Duu	Fukushi Ochiai	Aaron Campbell
Hybis	Reimi	Kristin Sutton

== Production ==
Toei Animation announced at their New York Comic Con panel on October 12, 2023, that a new anime titled Dragon Ball Daima would be released in Q4 2024. Dragon Ball creator Akira Toriyama was said to be "deeply involved beyond his usual capacity" and is credited in the accompanying teaser trailer with the original work, story, and character designs. A press release also credited him with creating the designs for many of the vehicles, monsters, and background characters, and coining the title. Toriyama provided a message to the Comic Con panel explaining that although "DAIMA" is a made-up term, it is written in Japanese as "大魔". Akio Iyoku, executive producer of the Dragon Ball franchise, said that the series had been in the works for the last five years, but the title was decided less than a month ago.

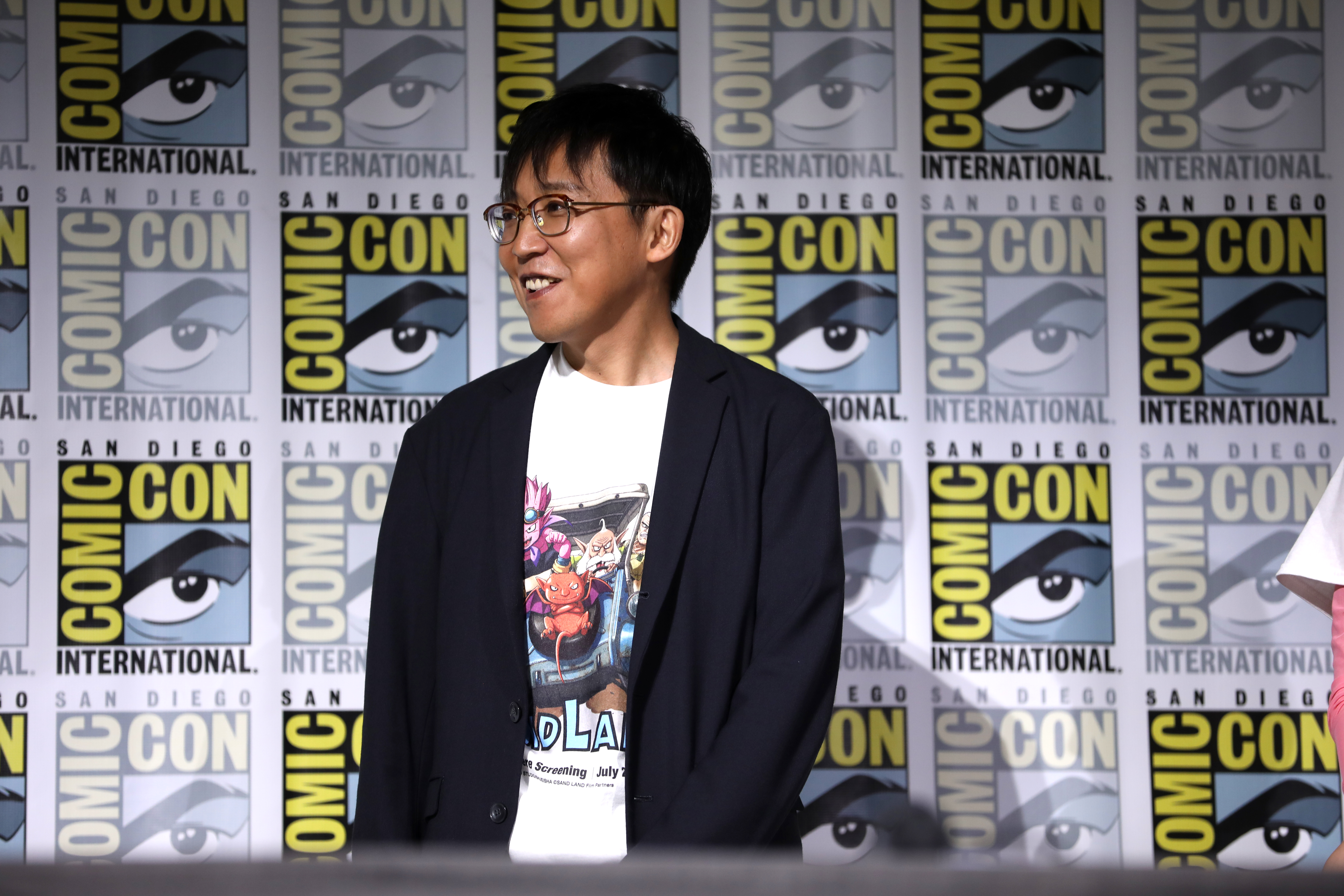
Akio Iyoku said that Dragon Ball GT was used as a "starting point" for the creation of Dragon Ball Daima.

It was while working on the 2022 film Dragon Ball Super: Super Hero that the staff began considering a new series and asked Toriyama to look at it. According to Iyoku, Toriyama became very enthusiastic about the project and wound up "crafting the entire story", which Iyoku described as having a "strong sense of adventure and lots of action". Aiming for viewers who watched Dragon Ball GT as children and were now adults, Iyoku consciously tried to make an anime that they could watch with their own children. Like GT, Daima depicts an adventure. It also has a different feel than Dragon Ball Super, where Goku is constantly striving to become stronger. The staff aimed to appeal to a wider audience and, looking back on Daima in retrospect, Iyoku felt that Toriyama's unexpectedly making everyone in the cast small aided them in this. They worked on the story so diligently, that production of the anime began before it was completed.

In November 2023, the January 2024 issue of V Jump announced the main staff members of Dragon Ball Daima and confirmed that Masako Nozawa would reprise her role as Goku. Yoshitaka Yashima, animation director of Dragon Ball Super, and Aya Komaki, director of One Piece, both served as directors of the anime, while Yūko Kakihara, Urusei Yatsura, is credited with series composition and scenario. Katsuyoshi Nakatsuru, who previously worked on Dragon Ball, Dragon Ball Z, and Dragon Ball GT, adapted Toriyama's character designs for animation.

A second trailer focusing on Goku was released as part of the Dragon Ball Games Battle Hour event on January 28, 2024. Character illustrations that Toriyama created for the anime, including some new characters, were shown during a livestream of the event. Toriyama died on March 1, 2024. A week later, the message he sent to the 2024 Tokyo Anime Awards Festival in acceptance of their Lifetime Achievement Award was publicly displayed at the event. In it, he revealed that Dragon Ball Daima was originally planned to be an original anime series without his involvement, "but as I gave advice here and there, I ended up getting deeply involved with the project without realizing it."

A key visual featuring multiple characters with the tagline "Welcome to the Great Adventure!" and a third trailer were both released on July 19 and revealed that the show would debut that October. On September 2, Fuji Television announced the specific broadcast details, including the start date of October 10, and that all episodes of the show were completed. Two days later, a fourth trailer and a second key visual, featuring two more characters than the first visual and changing the tagline to "Welcome to the Demon Realm!", were released. The former revealed cast members Yumiko Kobayashi as Kaioshin, Koki Uchiyama as Glorio, and Fairouz Ai as Panzy, and also teased the show's theme song. The roles of Showtaro Morikubo as Gomah, Junya Enoki as Degesu, and Yoko Hikasa as Dr. Arinsu were announced by the franchise's official website on September 10. Daima is the first production not to feature Tōru Furuya as Yamcha, as it was announced that he would be replaced by Ryōta Suzuki on October 4. Without any prior announcement, the second episode of the series aired on October 18 and featured voice actor changes for nearly all of the franchise's major characters due to them being turned into children.

=== Music ===
The music in Dragon Ball Daima was composed by Kosuke Yamashita. Nippon Columbia released approximately 70 of his tracks from the anime as the show's original soundtrack album on March 19, 2025. The opening theme song is "Jaka Jaan" by German record producer Zedd and Japanese vocal duo C&K. Zedd was offered the job of composing the song as he is an open fan of Dragon Ball, and the lyrics were written by Yukinojo Mori, who has written many songs for the franchise. Mori commented that although he was worried about writing for the franchise yet again, Toriyama gave fresh excitement by changing its direction from "battle" to "adventure". Keen of C&K is credited with co-composing the music. The ending theme is "Nakama" by Zedd featuring Japanese-American singer Ai. Zedd again composed the music, while Ai wrote the lyrics.

The lyrics of the opening theme as well as visuals in both the opening and ending animations pay tribute to Akira Toriyama. The rōmaji lyrics of "Jaka Jaan" contain certain syllables that spell out his name in the first half of the song. In particular, the segment "yume wa TORI dori, naYAMAnai, AKIRA menai" is noted as being most definitely intentional due to two factors. Firstly, the word "toridori" is uncommon, with one analyst noting they had never heard a native speaker use that word before. Second, these syllables are capitalized in the official rōmaji transliteration. Additionally, the opening and ending animations feature the recurring motif of an ethereal white bird flying near Goku, likely representing Toriyama's spirit given his name contains the Japanese word for "bird" and his company is called Bird Studio.

== Release ==
Dragon Ball Daima had its world premiere at Tokyo Big Sight on October 6, 2024, during the Dragon Ball Daimatsuri event, which commemorated the 40th anniversary of the original manga series. The first episode was screened three times throughout the day, with cast members in attendance during the first two. The series began its broadcast in Japan on Fuji Television and its FNS affiliates on October 11, 2024, and continued to air on Fridays at 11:40 p.m. The first episode is ten minutes longer than normal. The anime ended with its 20th episode on February 28, 2025. The entire series was released on home video in DVD and Blu-ray box sets on July 2, 2025.

Crunchyroll began streaming the series worldwide outside of East Asia, Europe, and Middle East on October 11, 2024. The company would release the series on Blu-ray set in standard and limited editions on March 3, 2026. However, on February 7, 2026, it was revealed, via a press release, that the release date for the Blu-ray set was delayed and would be released at a later date; it was released on August 10, 2026. Hulu also streamed it on the same day in the United States, while Netflix began streaming it in Asia on October 14, then globally on October 18. Toei Animation and Fathom Events screened the English dub of the first three episodes in United States theaters from November 10–12, 2024. The English dub released on Crunchyroll from January 10 to May 16, 2025. In the United States, the series made its broadcast television premiere on Adult Swim's Toonami programming block from June 15 to November 2, 2025.

== Episodes ==
No.	Title	Directed by (Note: Production staff information is taken from the ending credits of each episode.)	Animation directed by	Art directed by	Original release date	English air date
1	"Conspiracy"; Transliteration: "Inbō" (Japanese: インボウ)	Directed by : Aya Komaki; Storyboarded by : Yoshitaka Yashima	Takeo Ide Chikashi Kubota (chief)	Maya Kasai & Bun Sun Lee	October 11, 2024 (Note: Episode 1 is a 32 minute special.)	June 15, 2025
After the death of Dabura, (Note: As depicted in the Majin Buu Saga in Dragon Ball Z) Gomah becomes the new Supreme King of the Demon Realm. He and Degesu, Vice-Supreme King and Supreme Kai Shin's younger brother, watch what transpired against Majin Buu. Dr. Arinsu, Shin and Degesu's older sister, joins them to ask Gomah if he will give supplies for her research just like Dabura did and gives them the idea to use the Dragon Balls to make the warriors who fought against Buu young in order for them to not pose any threat to the Demon Realm. Due to the Demon Realm's Dragon Balls being protected by robot creatures called Tamagami, Gomah, Degesu, and Neva, a Namekian and creator of the Demon Realm's Dragon Balls, go to Kami's Lookout. When they leave the Demon Realm, they learn that Arinsu visited Earth at some point. On Earth, the Z-Warriors and their allies except Gohan are celebrating Trunks' ninth birthday at Capsule Corporation. Meanwhile on Kami's Lookout, Neva uses his power to collect Earth's Dragon Balls. Dende tries to stop them but is knocked unconscious by Degesu. Degesu summons Shenron and Gomah wishes for the Z-Warriors and allies who fought Buu to be turned into children.
2	"Glorio"; Transliteration: "Gurorio" (Japanese: グロリオ)	Directed by : Kazuya Karasawa; Storyboarded by : Yoshitaka Yashima	Naoko Yamaoka Yūya Takahashi (chief)	Maya Kasai & Bun Sun Lee	October 18, 2024	June 22, 2025
The Z-Warriors and their friends are turned into children by Gomah's wish, while those who are already children are turned into infants. Gomah takes an infant Dende as a hostage and returns with his group to the Demon Realm. Sensing a disturbance on Kami's Lookout, Shin and Kibito teleport there with Goku and Piccolo and find a young Mr. Popo, who explains what happened. Since mortals usually cannot enter the Demon Realm, Shin locates his long lost ship that brought him to Earth prior to Buu's awakening, though its abandonment has made it unusable. Promising to complete the ship within ten days, Vegeta and Bulma are brought to the Lookout to begin repairs. A few days later, another ship arrives from the Demon Realm, though its occupant, a demon named Glorio, desires to stop Gomah at his leader's behalf and asks Goku to help him. Having recently retrieved his Power Pole to fight since he is unaccustomed to his small body's reach, Goku accepts and is joined by Shin, while Vegeta and the rest of the Z-Warriors and allies are left to wait until Bulma's repairs are complete.
3	"Daima" (Japanese: ダイマ)	Directed by : Takao Kiriyama; Storyboarded by : Yoshitaka Yashima	Kozue Komatsu Miyako Tsuji (chief)	Maya Kasai, Eiji Hamano & Bun Sun Lee	October 25, 2024	June 29, 2025
Glorio, Shin, and Goku fly to a nearby planet called Batapi. There, they encounter a Warp Lord, a massive fish-like entity that acts as the portal between the Demon Realm and the known universes. Glorio enters the password to travel, though Shin is not able to relay it telepathically to Kibito before being teleported. The group appears at the access gate to the Demon Realm, which is split into three worlds, and enter into the Third Demon World. Glorio explains that travel between worlds is only done through the Warp Lords after the access tunnels connecting the three realms were sealed with magic, and while he lives in Third World, he works in the First Demon World where Gomah's kingdom is located. After landing the ship on the surface, Goku and Shin find it similar to that of Earth, though the air is heavy with fumes spouted from the local volcanoes. The trio also find the area is very hostile, as both tribal inhabitants and the local townsfolk provoke attacks without warning. After dispatching a group of thugs at a restaurant in a nearby town, the group rests at an inn. The next morning, however, Glorio's ship has been stolen by the thugs.
4	"Chatty"; Transliteration: "Oshaberi" (Japanese: オシャベリ)	Directed by : Kan Murakami; Storyboarded by : Yoshitaka Yashima	Yuuichi Hamano Naota Shintani (chief)	Maya Kasai, Eiji Hamano & Bun Sun Lee	November 1, 2024	July 20, 2025
Without a ship, Glorio, Shin, and Goku continue their journey on foot as the heavy atmosphere makes flying too strenuous. Their destination is the palace of the Third Demon World King, who sent Glorio to Earth for Goku. Fighting off monsters along the way, the group stops at a medicinal tea shop to rest. While there, the group obtain medicine similar to Senzu Beans, an herb that causes users to undergo Fusion, and a rocket-like seed for long distance travel. After riding on the seed, the group lands only half a day from the palace. However, upon realizing that each world in the Demon Realm has a Dragon Ball that can be earned after defeating their guardian Tamagami warrior, Goku convinces Glorio to head to the nearest Dragon Ball protector after reaching the Third World King's castle, which is back near where they started. Needing a break, the group finds a nearby town, where Gomah's minions, the Gendarmerie, harshly tax its citizens for gold at the risk of years taken from their lifespan. Goku steps in to defeat the minions after a young demon girl initially disrupts the oppression, who then inquires about Goku's intentions.
5	"Panzy"; Transliteration: "Panji" (Japanese: パンジ)	Directed by : Yūichi Tsuzuki; Storyboarded by : Yoshitaka Yashima	Naoki Murakami & Koji Watanabe Yūya Takahashi (chief)	Maya Kasai & Shinzō Yuki	November 8, 2024	July 20, 2025
The demon girl, who identifies herself as Panzy, follows the group as they continue their journey, still wondering about who they are and their motives. A self-described inventor, she demonstrates her knowledge of the Third World by assisting in their directions, as well as showing off her abilities using Magic, something she says many Majin Demons possess. Meanwhile, Gomah plans to raise Dende so he can make new Dragon Balls for him. The group arrives at the palace, Kadan Castle, where Panzy is revealed to be its princess. Goku and Shin are introduced to Panzy's father, King Kadan, and relay the situation regarding their youthful appearance, Dende's kidnapping, and the desired defeat of Gomah using the Demon Realm's three Dragon Balls. To demonstrate his strength, Goku defeats the warriors of the palace, earning Kadan's trust. As they prepare to depart, Kadan tasks one of his attendants, Hybis, to retrieve the remaining Z-Warriors from Earth. Boarding a ship, Panzy convinces her father to let her go too while Shin warns Goku that Glorio may be hiding his true intentions. Shortly after they take off, however, the ship engine sputters and they crash into the ground.
6	"Lightning"; Transliteration: "Inazuma" (Japanese: イナヅマ)	Gaku Yano	Takumi Yamamoto	Maya Kasai, Eiji Hamano & Bun Sun Lee	November 15, 2024	July 27, 2025
Panzy admits that the ship engine quit because her luggage exceeded the weight limit. As she repairs the engine, Goku ducks behind a bush to defecate. Gendarmerie members who seek revenge on Goku come looking for him, but the others convince them that he is not there and they leave. The engine is repaired and they take off after leaving some of the luggage behind. Shin explains that Degesu and Arinsu are his siblings who stayed in the Demon Realm due to their ambitions. When they make camp and sleep, Glorio secretly contacts Arinsu, revealing who he truly works for. A minotaur attacks the group as they sleep intending to eat them. Goku and Glorio argue about who gets to fight it and decide to fight, ignoring the minotaur. Glorio matches Goku's strength and uses magic to unleash electrical attacks, though he ultimately surrenders once Goku goes Super Saiyan. Frightened by Goku's power, the minotaur leaves. Meanwhile, Bulma finishes repairing Shin's ship, allowing Vegeta, Piccolo, and Kibito attempt to go to the Demon Realm, but the ship instantly powers down and crashes after only a few feet off the ground.
7	"Collar"; Transliteration: "Kubiwa" (Japanese: クビワ)	Ryūta Kawahara	Naoko Yamaoka	Maya Kasai, Eiji Hamano & Shinzō Yuki	November 22, 2024	August 3, 2025
Bulma realizes the ship is out of a fuel only found in the Demon Realm. Lamenting their lack of options, Hybis suddenly arrives and takes Vegeta, Piccolo, and Bulma to the Demon Realm while Kibito stays to look after the Lookout. The Gendarmerie detain Goku's group and Panzy suspects they tracked her collar, which all the Third World citizens must wear. Goku uses Instant Transmission to avoid detection, but a guard suspects that Panzy is the initial town tax disrupter, forcing the group to fight and defeat the Gendarmerie. Their ship is damaged in the fight, so they steal a Gendarmerie ship to blend in. Shin deduces Panzy's collar was designed by Arinsu and destroys it, freeing her, and reveals his birth name is Nahare. King Kadan instructs Hybis to bring his new guests over to Goku's group just as they arrive at the Third World Tamagami encampment. One of the locals and Panzy try to dissuade Goku from fighting it, saying every challenger has lost, but he challenges it anyway to earn its Dragon Ball.
8	"Tamagami" (Japanese: タマガミ)	Kazuya Karasawa	Kozue Komatsu	Maya Kasai, Eiji Hamano & Bun Sun Lee	November 29, 2024	August 10, 2025
The crowd watches in stunned amazement as Goku and the Third World Tamagami battle, evenly matched. Goku uses Super Saiyan and breaks the Tamagami's warhammer. After landing a Kamehameha and a strike as Super Saiyan 2, the Tamagami surrenders, but says to earn the Dragon Ball, Goku must find it in a shell game. Goku notices the Tamagami threw the Dragon Ball away instead of putting it in the cup, winning the challenge. As the crowd celebrates, Glorio contacts Arinsu and informs her of their success before they make their way to the Second World. Elsewhere, Gomah and Degesu review footage of Vegeta's Final Atonement Explosion against Buu and notice Arinsu in the background collecting some of Buu's regenerative residue. Arinsu visits Marba, the witch who created the original Buu, who is working on a new creature using Buu's residue as an ingredient. Arinsu adds her saliva to make the creature loyal and reveals her plan to overthrow Gomah and rule the Demon Realm, with Goku's collection of the Dragon Balls as her backup plan. Kadan contacts Hybis, Bulma, Vegeta, and Piccolo to tell them of Goku's achievement and to meet them at the Warp Lord.
9	"Thieves"; Transliteration: "Touzoku" (Japanese: トウゾク)	Takao Kiriyama	Shun Sawai & Hiroyuki Honda Yūya Takahashi (chief)	Maya Kasai & Shinzō Yuki	December 6, 2024	August 17, 2025
Goku's group stays in a hotel, but two thieves steal the Dragon Ball. Panzy put a tracking device in the bag, allowing Goku and Glorio to find and defeat the thieves. Kadan calls Panzy to inform them that Hybis' group will meet them at the Warp Lord. At a restaurant, Vegeta beats up some thugs, but they retaliate by stealing Hybis' ship, causing Hybis to ask Panzy for a pick up. At their castle, Gomah and Degesu learn that Goku and his friends are in the Demon Realm and are shocked that they already have one Dragon Ball. Goku and his group meet up with his friends and Hybis, but realize the ship cannot fit all of them, causing Panzy to call Kadan to provide another ship before Goku's group leaves. The thugs attack again, seeking revenge, but Vegeta and Piccolo defeat them and make them give back Hybis' ship. Elsewhere, Marba completes her new creature, Majin Kuu. To test its strength, Arinsu commands Kuu to defeat the First World Tamagami and take its Dragon Ball, which it understands.
10	"Ocean"; Transliteration: "Unabara" (Japanese: ウナバラ)	Directed by : Kan Murakami; Storyboarded by : Yoshitaka Yashima	Kaori Saito Naohiro Shintani (chief)	Maya Kasai, Eiji Hamano & Bun Sun Lee	December 13, 2024	August 24, 2025
Kuu challenges the First World Tamagami for its Dragon Ball, but is shown to be no match and forfeits, disappointing Arinsu. Elsewhere, Goku's group goes through the Warp Lord to the Second Demon World, where they are immediately attacked by Gendarmerie. Goku swiftly defeats them, but an underwater beast called a kraken drags their ship into the water, though Panzy is able to save their Dragon Ball just in time. Gomah and Degesu watch them on a monitor and are shocked by Goku's power, ordering all Gendarmerie to regroup in the First World. Hybis, Bulma, Vegeta, and Piccolo arrive in the Second World, where Goku warns them of the kraken before they all meet at the Nameks' original homeworld nearby. Nahare tells the group about the Nameks' situation, his past, how the multiple universes were created by a Majin named Rymus, the establishment of Supreme Kais, and that former Supreme Demon King Abura, Dabura's tyrannical predecessor and father, forced Nahare's species, the Glind, to flee the Demon Realm. He also reveals that the five trees the Glind are born from have died so they can no longer reproduce. As they prepare to leave, the group is approached by Neva.
11	"Legend"; Transliteration: "Densetsu" (Japanese: デンセツ)	Directed by : Yūichi Tsuzuki; Storyboarded by : Yoshitaka Yashima	Koji Watanabe & Hiromi Ishigami Takeo Ide (chief)	Maya Kasai & Eiji Hamano	December 20, 2024	August 31, 2025
Neva pretends to be senile, but Piccolo sees through his act, so he confesses his part in helping Gomah turn everyone into children and assures them that Dende is safe. He also reveals he created the Tamagamis before convincing the group to take him with them because the Dragon Balls require the Namekian language to work, which none of them can speak. Meanwhile, Arinsu and Kuu return to Marba and they create a new, possibly more unstable creature, Majin Duu, whom Kuu treats as his brother. After feeding him chocolate, Duu challenges the First World Tamagami and is powerful enough to fight evenly with it. Goku's group reaches the Second World Tamagami and Vegeta challenges it. Watching them on a monitor, Gomah and Degesu are shocked like before by Vegeta's power. The Tamagami knocks Vegeta into the water where a kraken suddenly swallows him whole, horrifying everyone.
12	"True Strength"; Transliteration: "Sokoji kara" (Japanese: ソコヂカラ)	Kazuya Karasawa	Yuuichi Hamano Yūya Takahashi & Emiko Miyamoto (chief)	Maya Kasai, Eiji Hamano & Bun Sun Lee	December 27, 2024	September 7, 2025
Vegeta frees himself of the kraken, but is forced to go Super Saiyan 2. Elsewhere, Duu continues to best the First World Tamagami, but demands more chocolate before continuing. Kuu feeds him some, after which Duu swiftly ends the fight. To earn the Dragon Ball, the Tamagami rapidly shows several numbers and challenges Duu to add them together. While neither Duu nor Arinsu could follow the numbers, Kuu whispers the correct answer to Duu, who recites it and wins the Dragon Ball. Gomah and Degesu see this on a monitor and question Arinsu's intentions. Meanwhile, seeing Vegeta and the Tamagami are evenly matched, Neva discreetly supercharges the latter, who then knocks Vegeta out. Once he regains consciousness, Vegeta goes Super Saiyan 3 and swiftly overpowers the Tamagami into submission. To earn the Dragon Ball, the Tamagami shows a word problem about an individual giving away biscuits before asking Vegeta how many the snake in the story ate at the end. Realizing snakes do not eat biscuits, Vegeta wins the Dragon Ball after he answers zero. As the group heads toward the First Demon World, Gomah tells Degesu they must take drastic measures.
13	"Surprise"; Transliteration: "Sapuraizu" (Japanese: サプライズ)	Aya Komaki	Shuntarō Mura & Koji Watanabe Naoko Yamaoka (chief)	Maya Kasai & Eiji Hamano	January 10, 2025	September 14, 2025
As a last resort, Gomah orders Degesu to disable all Warp Lords, seemingly trapping Goku and his friends in the Second World. Simultaneously, Goku's plane crash lands after experiencing more engine failure. While Bulma and Panzy complete repairs, the others explore their surroundings when Neva suddenly realizes they landed on a small, bioluminescent jungle planet of monstrous giants, urging for repairs to hurry. They discover this when an army of large hamsters suddenly attack, but more so when a towering native demon child and his pet dog stomps toward the ship. While the child sits on a nearby plateau, the dog sniffs the group out, forcing the fighters to distract it while Bulma and Panzy finish repairs. Once the repairs are completed, everyone boards the ship except Goku, Vegeta and Piccolo, who continue to distract not only the dog, but the child as well who starts swatting at them, believing they are insects. Going Super Saiyan, Goku keeps the child at bay before flying away with the ship and the others, where they ponder the many mysteries the Demon Worlds offer.
14	"Taboo"; Transliteration: "Tabū" (Japanese: タブー)	Gaku Yano	Takumi Yamamoto	Maya Kasai & Bun Sun Lee	January 17, 2025	September 21, 2025
As Panzy calls her kingdom to report their progress, Degesu gathers an elite group of Gendarmerie known as the Gendarmerie Force. While he is unimpressed by their goofy nature, Gomah orders them to guard his palace from Goku's group in case they get past the disabled Warp Lord, though the Force is unconcerned hearing the invaders are children. Finding the Warp Lord unresponsive, Goku uses his Power Pole to test the blocked access tunnels, getting electrocuted into unconsciousness. Neva intervenes and magically opens the tunnels separating all three worlds, explaining that he created them to protect the Second World from First World snobs and Third World ruffians. Elsewhere, the Gendarmerie Force encounter Kuu and Duu at a convenience store, befriending them by buying them chocolate. Extreme turbulence traveling to the First World forces Goku's group to abandon ship upon entering its atmosphere. When Gomah learns of their arrival, he orders all his men to attack as the group attempts to escape.
15	"Third Eye"; Transliteration: "Sādo Ai" (Japanese: サードアイ)	Takao Kiriyama	Mikio Fujiwara Kozue Komatsu (chief)	Maya Kasai	January 24, 2025	September 28, 2025
Goku's group initially struggles against the numbers of the Gendarmerie, but are able to fend them off after regrouping. In his video feed, Gomah notices Hybis' belt buckle contains the legendary artifact called the Evil Third Eye, also known as the Tertian Occulus. A flashback shows that Abura, Dabura's father, owned the Third Eye, which amplified his power, until Dabura hired someone to steal it. The thief hid it in the Third Demon World before getting killed by a native, where Hybis then found it and attached it to his belt buckle. Back in the present, Goku's group arrives at Gomah's palace where more Gendarmerie await. While being cornered, a demon woman approaches Hybis and attempts to seduce him for the belt, and though he refuses, he ends up trading it for her large hat. Goku's group is pinned down by tanks until Kadan and his forces arrive and turn the tide. Gomah cannot believe the Gendarmerie lost, but Degesu assures him the Gendarmerie Force cannot be beaten before glaring suspiciously. Elsewhere, Arinsu smiles and says her plan is working.
16	"Degesu" (Japanese: デゲス)	Ryūta Kawahara	Tadayoshi Yamamuro & Shun Sawai Yūya Takahashi (chief)	Maya Kasai	January 31, 2025	October 5, 2025
Following their victory in the castle courtyard, Goku's group encounter the Gendarmerie Force at the entrance gate. Vegeta effortlessly defeats them, leaving them tied up and out of the way. Goku, Vegeta, Nahare, and Piccolo alone enter the castle to find Dende, unaware that Panzy is in pursuit as well, and find Degesu attempting to escape on a ship with Dende in his arms. Revealing his own plans to overthrow Gomah, Degesu threatens Dende unless he is allowed to escape. However, Degesu becomes distracted when Glorio appears and throws Hybis' new hat at him, allowing Piccolo to take him down and Panzy to rescue Dende. With Degesu in Kadan's custody, Goku's group heads to the Tamagami, who reveals it already lost the Dragon Ball. Arinsu then arrives with her two Majin and confirms the Dragon Ball is in her possession. Within the castle, the demon woman who traded the hat for the Third Eye finds Gomah, who rewards her with treasure and has her assist in inserting the eye into his forehead, which suddenly causes him to grow in strength and size.
17	"Gomah"; Transliteration: "Gomā" (Japanese: ゴマー)	Kazuya Karasawa	Koji Watanabe & Shuntarō Mura Takeo Ide (chief)	Maya Kasai	February 7, 2025	October 12, 2025
Nahare asks Arinsu for the Dragon Ball, but she declines, desiring to use her wish to strengthen the Demon Realm so that it may dominate the outside universes. To take control of the Dragon Balls, she proposes a one-on-one duel with Duu, where Goku volunteers. They fight evenly matched, trading blows against one another, until Gomah interrupts the bout in his giant form. Utilizing the Third Eye, he telekinetically arranges the floating rocks around his fortress into an arena and challenges them. Vegeta attempts a sneak attack, but is easily defeated by Gomah, even when using Super Saiyan. Goku, Piccolo, Nahare, and Glorio step in to assist, but Gomah effortlessly overpowers them, causing Goku to unknowingly drop his bag of medicines. Even with Arinsu offering her two Majins and Neva ordering the Tamagami to help, they are still no match for Gomah's enhanced strength. Using his telekinesis, Gomah seizes Goku and tries to finish him, but Duu and the Tamagami intercept, giving Goku time to break free by using Super Saiyan 3.
18	"Awakening"; Transliteration: "Mezame" (Japanese: メザメ)	Directed by : Kan Murakami; Storyboarded by : Aya Komaki	Kaori Saito & Mikio Fujiwara Tadayoshi Yamamuro (chief)	Maya Kasai	February 14, 2025	October 19, 2025
Goku and Gomah trade blows back and forth, inspiring Duu to aid the former. Kuu throws to Duu a large chocolate cookie, increasing his power and mimicking Goku's long-haired appearance. The two fight well together until Duu's sugar rush ends, and he is replaced by the Tamagami, albeit now at a power disadvantage. When Gomah knocks down Goku, he begins charging a finishing attack, but Neva uses his magic to grant Goku more power, allowing him to transform into Super Saiyan 4. Empowered, Goku begins to outmatch Gomah, and with support from the other fighters, launches a devastating Kamehameha. After apparently being defeated, Gomah returns, much larger than before, and uses the Third Eye's magic to trap Goku and drain him of energy. Glorio then receives a call from Arinsu, asking him to bring her the Dragon Balls. He does so and, revealed to have previously learned the Namekian language, summons a red variation of the dragon Porunga. Arinsu then commands Glorio to tell Porunga she wants to become the Supreme Demon King. But a conflicted Glorio asks for an unspecified wish to Porunga, which he grants.
19	"Betrayal"; Transliteration: "Uragiri" (Japanese: ウラギリ)	Kazuya Karasawa	Yuuichi Hamano Tadayoshi Yamamuro & Yūya Takahashi (chief)	Maya Kasai	February 21, 2025	October 26, 2025
Against Arinsu's command, Glorio uses the wish to restore the bodies of Goku and his friends back to normal. As the Dragon Balls disperse, Vegeta fights Gomah first while Arinsu fires Glorio for going against her command. Evenly matched with Gomah in his Base form, Vegeta immediately powers up to Super Saiyan 3 and begins to batter Gomah around. Ashamed for his supposed betrayal, Glorio returns to Goku and his friends, though they welcome him back with open arms. Vegeta's barrage ends with a massive Final Flash, though the Third Eye continues to heal Gomah of his wounds. Goku, Piccolo, and even Arinsu analyze the Third Eye's abilities, causing the latter to send Kuu to retrieve a tome on magical items. Discovering the Third Eye can be dislodged with three consecutive hits to the back of the head, Arinsu relays this information to Goku and his friends. Bulma reins in an exhausted Vegeta, allowing Goku, and secretly Piccolo, to attack Gomah with this plan in mind. Similar to his fight with Buu, Goku showcases the Super Saiyan forms before he surprises everyone by transforming into Super Saiyan 4 again.
20	"Maximum"; Transliteration: "Zenkai" (Japanese: ゼンカイ)	Aya Komaki	See note for the ADs (Note: Tadayoshi Yamamuro, Yūya Takahashi, Chikashi Kubota, Takumi Yamamoto, Shuntarō Mura, Koji Watanabe, Shun Sawai, Kozue Komatsu, Naoko Yamaoka, Emiko Miyamoto, Takeo Ide & Osamu Ishikawa) Katsuyoshi Nakatsuru (chief)	Maya Kasai	February 28, 2025	November 2, 2025
Goku and Gomah trade blows as Piccolo awaits an opening. When at a stalemate, Goku charges an ultimate Kamehameha while Gomah counters with his own energy blast. Goku's Kamehameha ultimately pierces through Gomah and the border between all three Demon Worlds. Piccolo then strikes Gomah twice in the back of the head before being repelled by Gomah before he strikes the final hit. Gomah uses the Third Eye's power to heal himself and attack everyone. In the commotion, Kuu uses the tome to hit Gomah three consecutive times, removing the Third Eye from Gomah's forehead. Glorio crushes the eye under his feet while Arinsu and Marba seal Gomah and Degesu away for 99 years. Afterward, Arinsu refuses to be nominated as the new Supreme Demon King, so Kuu is chosen instead since he was the one who defeated Gomah. He then selects Arinsu as his Vice-Supreme Demon King, while King Kadan, Glorio, Neva, and others are selected as ministers. On the way home, Goku and his friends stop at the medicine shop in the Third Demon World. There, Bulma purchases de-aging bugs while Panzy shockingly finds two more Third Eyes in a jar, which the shopkeeper says are for sale.

== Reception ==
=== Critical reception ===
On Rotten Tomatoes, Dragon Ball Daima has an approval rating of 100% based on five reviews, with an average rating of 7/10. Despite its eventual critical success, the series had a pre-release reception that was more mixed. Joshua Fox of Screen Rant wrote that the attitude before Daima aired was a mix of excitement and trepidation, but personally felt it had disproved the criticism by episode 8.

Mariló Delgado's Spanish-language review for Espinof praised the series as an exercise in nostalgia, but warned viewers to be patient. Her final rating was a 4/5, but with the caveat that the story would take some time to truly begin. The pacing was contentious among some Dragon Ball fans, according to CBR, as it was simultaneously leisurely and rushed. CBR had earlier reported that Daima was not what many fans wanted, who were looking forward to a return of the Dragon Ball Super anime, particularly an adaptation of the manga-only Moro Saga. However, they disagreed and sided with the fact that it was what the franchise needed. Commenting on the eighth episode of the anime, Joshua Fox of Screen Rant declared the series was what the anime fans had waited decades for. Fox praised the choreography as some of the best in any Dragon Ball series; he considered the comedy to be equally noteworthy. He also noted that an early episode of such a quality may be a sign of an even better climax.

CBR's Daniel Kurland considered the seventeenth episode "perfect" and the animation to be "mind-blowing." He praised the fight between Goku and Majin Duu, and commented that it contained "some of the best visuals that have been in the franchise." Of the battle between Gomah and several other fighters, he wrote that it was "cinematic" and that it felt as if the episode was showing off. Kurland concluded the review by stating that the only potential criticism is that the final three episodes may still surpass this one. He rated the following episode a 10/10, calling it "another perfect half hour of television."

Kurland tripled up on his 10/10 score for the nineteenth episode, "Betrayal", praising the showcasing and battle scenes of Vegeta against Gomah, the humor of Bulma reining in Vegeta for Goku to tag in, and the appearance of Super Saiyan 4 adult Goku. He summarized both the eighteenth and nineteenth episodes as "the best one-two punches in Dragon Ball history" and episode nineteen itself as "the groundwork for greatness" and that it "gives fans everything they want".

Following the premiere of "Betrayal", CBR reported that the episode had broken the record for the best-rated anime episode of 2025. It surpassed the sixth episode of Solo Leveling's second season, and Daima's own eighteenth episode, which had equaled the record set by Solo Leveling.

While the English dub was well received in general, its delayed streaming release schedule was criticized.

=== Viewership, box office and sales ===
The series was the second-most viewed non-English series on Netflix for the week of October 21 to 27, 2024, with 3.2 million views. It ranked in the streaming service's top 10 in 42 countries, including first place in Chile, Ecuador, Peru, Malaysia and Vietnam. It was also the most-viewed kids show worldwide on Netflix.

Through its broadcast on Fuji Television, fourteen of Dragon Ball Daima's twenty episodes ranked in the top 10 most-watched animated shows in Japan. The premiere episode was watched by 3.2% of Japanese households, while the finale was seen by 2.8%. The series gained ratings following the reveal of Vegeta's Super Saiyan 3 transformation in episode 12. Similarly, following a dip with Episode 16, ratings experienced another surge with the premiere of Episode 18, which saw the show reach the top three. Additionally, several streaming services, including piracy websites, experienced server outages. This increased viewership was attributed to hype surrounding the battle with Gomah, Goku's newly reintroduced Super Saiyan 4 transformation, and the series approaching its finale.

Dragon Ball Daima grossed $661,204 during its limited American theatrical release, which featured the first three episodes of the English dub.

The limited edition Blu-ray release of Dragon Ball Daima reached number 20 on Oricon's Weekly Blu-ray Rankings chart, which tracks home video sales.

=== Accolades ===
Year	Award	Category	Recipient	Result	Ref.
2025	5th Astra TV Awards	Best Anime Series	Dragon Ball Daima	Won	
2025	5th Astra TV Awards	Best Lead Voice-Over Performance	Stephanie Nadolny as Son Goku (mini)	Nominated	
2025	Nickelodeon Kids' Choice Awards 2025	Favorite Cartoon	Dragon Ball Daima	Nominated	
2026	10th Crunchyroll Anime Awards	Best Voice Artist Performance (Brazilian Portuguese)	Úrsula Bezerra as Son Goku	Nominated	

== Legacy and impact ==
Dragon Ball Daima was announced in October 2023. However, due to Akira Toriyama's death in March 2024, the series effectively became his swan song, and released on the series' 40th anniversary with a focus on returning to its roots. The accidental finality of the series was often mentioned in coverage, with Toriyama's brand of juvenile comedy being praised as a positively distinct feature of the anime. Easter eggs referencing his earlier works were also frequently noted, such as Duu greeting people in a similar manner to Arale Norimaki from Dr. Slump, and Neva singing "Makafushigi Adventure!", the opening theme of the original Dragon Ball anime.
