= List of Dragon Ball Z episodes =

Episodes of Japanese anime series

The first volume of the individual DVD compilations of Dragon Ball Z released in Japan.

Dragon Ball Z (ドラゴンボールゼット, Doragon Bōru Zetto; commonly abbreviated as DBZ) is the long-running anime sequel to the Dragon Ball TV series, adapted from the final twenty-six volumes of the Dragon Ball manga written by Akira Toriyama. The manga portion of the series debuted in Weekly Shōnen Jump on October 4, 1988, and lasted until May 23, 1995; the anime adaptation premiered in Japan on Fuji Television on April 26, 1989, taking over its predecessor's time slot, and ran until its end on January 31, 1996, lasting 291 episodes in Japan, and 276 episodes in the United States originally, although all 291 episodes were later broadcast when material from the first 67 episodes was restored.

Dragon Ball Z uses four pieces of theme music in the Japanese version. From episodes 1–199, the opening theme is "Cha-La Head-Cha-La" by Hironobu Kageyama, and the closing theme is "Detekoi Tobikiri Zenkai Pawā!" by MANNA. From episodes 200–291, the opening and closing themes are "We Gotta Power" and "Boku-Tachi wa Tenshi Datta," both by Hironobu Kageyama.

== Series overview ==
In Japan, Dragon Ball Z was aired year-round continuously, with regular off-days for sporting events and television specials taking place about once every six weeks on average. The English broadcast was divided into eight separate near-continuous blocks with breaks varying between four months to over a year between each block. Only in one instance, between episodes 194 and 195, was there actually parity between the DVD release and the actual broadcast sequence in terms of the end of one "season" and the beginning of the next.

Season (Note: The "seasons" that comprise the following list correspond to the remastered box sets released by Funimation from 2007 to 2009; these correspond to story arcs (which are themselves split at debatable points), and not to the pattern in which the series actually aired in either Japan or the United States.)	Episodes	Originally released	
Season	Episodes	First released	Last released
1	39	April 26, 1989	March 7, 1990
2	35	March 14, 1990	January 16, 1991
3	33	January 23, 1991	September 11, 1991
4	32	September 18, 1991	May 13, 1992
5	26	May 20, 1992	November 18, 1992
6	29	November 25, 1992	July 21, 1993
7	25	July 28, 1993	March 2, 1994
8	34	March 9, 1994	January 25, 1995
9	38	February 1, 1995	January 31, 1996

== Episodes ==
=== Season 1: Saiyan Saga (1989–1990) ===
No.	Initial dub no.	Translated title/Original North American dub title[North American re-dub title] Original Japanese	Directed by	Written by	Animation directed by	Original release date	English air date
1	1	"Mini-Goku is an Overprotected Boy! I Am Gohan." / "The Arrival of Raditz" [The New Threat] Transliteration: "Mini Gokū wa Obotchama! Boku Gohan Desu." (Japanese: ミニ悟空はおぼっちゃま！ボク悟飯です。)	Daisuke Nishio	Takao Koyama	Masayuki Uchiyama	April 26, 1989	September 13, 1996 June 14, 2005 (re-dub)
2	1	"The Mightiest Warrior in All of History is Goku's Older Brother!" / "The Arrival of Raditz" [Reunions] Transliteration: "Shijō Saikyō no Senshi wa Gokū no Ani Datta!" (Japanese: 史上最強の戦士は悟空の兄だった！)	Osamu Kasai	Katsuyuki Sumisawa & Takao Koyama	Katsumi Aoshima	May 3, 1989	September 13, 1996; June 15, 2005 (re-dub)
3	2	"All Right! This is the Strongest Combo in the World!" / "The World's Strongest Team" [Unlikely Alliance] Transliteration: "Yatta! Kore ga Chijō Saikyō no Konbi Da!" (Japanese: やった！これが地上最強のコンビだ！)	Kazuhisa Takenouchi	Katsuyuki Sumisawa	Mitsuo Shindō	May 10, 1989	September 20, 1996; June 16, 2005 (re-dub)
4	3	"Piccolo's Trump Card! Gohan, the Crybaby-kun" / "Gohan's Hidden Powers" [Piccolo's Plan] Transliteration: "Pikkoro no Kirifuda! Gohan wa Nakimushikun" (Japanese: ピッコロの切り札！悟飯は泣きむしクン)	Yoshihiro Ueda	Toshiki Inoue	Tomekichi Takeuchi	May 17, 1989	September 27, 1996; June 20, 2005 (re-dub)
5	4	"Goku Dies! There's Only One Last Chance" / "Goku's Unusual Journey" [Gohan's Rage] Transliteration: "Gokū Shisu! Rasuto Chansu wa Ichido dake" (Japanese: 悟空死す！ラストチャンスは一度だけ)	Kazuhisa Takenouchi	Takao Koyama	Masayuki Uchiyama	May 24, 1989	October 4, 1996; June 21, 2005 (re-dub)
6	4	"Even Yama-sama is Surprised — The Fight Continues in the Next World" / "Goku's Unusual Journey" [No Time Like the Present] Transliteration: "Enmasama mo Bikkuri — Ano Yo de Faito" (Japanese: エンマ様もビックリあの世でファイト)	Mitsuo Hashimoto	Keiji Terui	Yukio Ebisawa	June 7, 1989	October 4, 1996; June 22, 2005 (re-dub)
7	5	"Survival with Dinosaurs! Gohan's Harsh Training" / "Gohan's Metamorphosis" [Day 1] Transliteration: "Kyōryū to Sabaibaru! Gohan no Tsurai Shugyō" (Japanese: 恐竜とサバイバル！悟飯のツライ修行)	Minoru Okazaki	Keiji Terui	Minoru Maeda	June 14, 1989	October 11, 1996; June 23, 2005 (re-dub)
8	5	"A Great Transformation on a Moonlit Night! The Secret of Gohan's Power" / "Gohan's Metamorphosis" [Gohan Goes Bananas!] Transliteration: "Tsuki no Kagayaku Yoru ni Daihenshin! Gohan Pawā no Himitsu" (Japanese: 月の輝く夜に大変身！悟飯パワーの秘密)	Yoshihiro Ueda	Takao Koyama	Masayuki Uchiyama	June 21, 1989	October 11, 1996; June 27, 2005 (re-dub)
9	6	"Sorry, Robot-san — The Desert of Vanishing Tears" / "Gohan Makes a Friend" [The Strangest Robot] Transliteration: "Gomen ne Robottosan Sabaku ni Kieta Namida." (Japanese: ゴメンねロボットさん砂漠に消えた涙。)	Osamu Kasai	Katsuyuki Sumisawa	Katsumi Aoshima	June 28, 1989	October 18, 1996; June 28, 2005 (re-dub)
10	6	"Don't Cry, Gohan! His First Fight" / "Gohan Makes a Friend" [A New Friend] Transliteration: "Naku na Gohan! Hajimete no Tatakai." (Japanese: 泣くな悟飯！はじめての闘い)	Kazuhisa Takenouchi	Keiji Terui	Mitsuo Shindō	July 5, 1989	October 18, 1996; June 29, 2005 (re-dub)
11	7	"The Saiyans, Mightiest Warriors in the Universe, Awaken!" / "Trouble on Arlia" [Terror on Arlia] Transliteration: "Uchūichi no Kyōsenshi Saiyajin Mezameru!" (Japanese: 宇宙一の強戦士サイヤ人めざめる！)	Yoshihiro Ueda	Toshiki Inoue	Tomekichi Takeuchi	July 12, 1989	October 25, 1996; June 30, 2005 (re-dub)
12	8	"Catnap on the Serpentine Road Goku Takes a Tumble" / "Home For Infinite Losers" [Global Training] Transliteration: "Hebi no Michi de Inemuri Gokū ga Okkochiru" (Japanese: 蛇の道でいねむり悟空が落っこちる)	Daisuke Nishio	Takao Koyama	Masayuki Uchiyama	July 19, 1989	November 1, 1996; July 4, 2005 (re-dub)
13	8	"Hands Off! Enma-sama’s Secret Fruit" / "Home For Infinite Losers" [Goz and Mez] Transliteration: "Te o Dasu na! Enmasama no Himitsu no Kudamono" (Japanese: 手を出すな！エンマ様の秘密の果実)	Mitsuo Hashimoto	Katsuyuki Sumisawa	Yukio Ebisawa	July 26, 1989	November 1, 1996; July 5, 2005 (re-dub)
14	9	"Such Sweet Temptation! The Snake Princess-sama's Hospitality" / "Princess Snake's Hospitality" [Princess Snake] Transliteration: "Ama〜i Yūwaku! Hebihimesama no Omotenashi" (Japanese: あま～い誘惑！蛇姫さまのおもてなし)	Minoru Okazaki	Hiroshi Toda	Minoru Maeda	August 2, 1989	November 8, 1996; July 6, 2005 (re-dub)
15	10	"Escape from Piccolo! Gohan Summons a Storm" / "Escape from Piccolo" [Dueling Piccolos] Transliteration: "Pikkoro kara no Dasshutsu! Arashi o Yobu Gohan" (Japanese: ピッコロからの脱出！嵐を呼ぶ悟飯)	Kazuhisa Takenouchi	Katsuyuki Sumisawa	Masayuki Uchiyama	August 9, 1989	October 28, 1997 (video premiere); September 11, 1998; July 7, 2005 (re-dub)
16	10	"Run, Gohan! Longing for Mount Paozu, Where Chichi is Waiting" / "Escape from Piccolo" [Plight of the Children] Transliteration: "Hashire Gohan! Chichi no Matsu Natsukashi no Paozu Yama" (Japanese: 走れ悟飯！チチの待つなつかしのパオズ山)	Mitsuo Hashimoto; Storyboarded by : Katsumi Aoshima	Keiji Terui	Katsumi Aoshima	August 16, 1989	October 28, 1997 (video premiere); September 11, 1998; July 11, 2005 (re-dub)
17	11	"City of No Tomorrow! The Long Road to Victory" / "Showdown in the Past" [Pendulum Room Peril] Transliteration: "Asu Naki Machi! Shōri e no Tōi Michinori" (Japanese: 明日なき街！勝利への遠い道のり)	Osamu Kasai	Hiroshi Toda	Mitsuo Shindō	August 30, 1989	November 15, 1996; July 12, 2005 (re-dub)
18	12	"Last Stop on the Serpentine Road! Are You Kaio-sama?" / "The End of Snake Way" [The End of Snake Way] Transliteration: "Shūte〜n Hebi no Michi! Omē Kaiōsama ka?" (Japanese: 終点～ん蛇の道！おめえ界王様か？)	Yoshihiro Ueda	Katsuyuki Sumisawa	Masayuki Uchiyama	September 6, 1989	January 3, 1997; July 13, 2005 (re-dub)
19	13	"The Battle with Gravity! Catch Bubbles-kun" / "A Fight Against Gravity... Catch Bubbles!" [Defying Gravity] Transliteration: "Jūryoku to no Tatakai! Baburusukun o Tsukamaero" (Japanese: 重力との戦い！バブルス君をつかまえろ)	Kazuhisa Takenouchi	Hiroshi Toda	Tomekichi Takeuchi	September 13, 1989	January 10, 1997; July 14, 2005 (re-dub)
20	14	"The Saiyan Legend Reborn! Goku's Roots" / "The Legend of the Saiyans" [Goku's Ancestors] Transliteration: "Yomigaeru Saiyajin Densetsu! Gokū no Rūtsu" (Japanese: よみがえるサイヤ人伝説！悟空のルーツ)	Mitsuo Hashimoto	Takao Koyama	Yukio Ebisawa	September 20, 1989	January 17, 1997; July 18, 2005 (re-dub)
21	15	"Come Forth, Shen Long! The Saiyans Finally Arrive on Earth" / "A Black Day for Planet Earth" [Counting Down] Transliteration: "Ide yo Shenron! Saiyajin Tsui ni Chikyū Tōchaku" (Japanese: いでよ神龍！サイヤ人ついに地球到着)	Minoru Okazaki	Keiji Terui	Minoru Maeda	September 27, 1989	January 24, 1997; July 19, 2005 (re-dub)
22	16	"Unbelievable! Saibaimen, Born of the Soil" / "The Battle Begins... Goku Where Are You?" [The Darkest Day] (Japanese: んなバカな！土から生まれたサイバイマン)	Kazuhisa Takenouchi	Takao Koyama	Masayuki Uchiyama	October 11, 1989	February 1, 1997; July 20, 2005 (re-dub)
23	17	"Yamucha Dies! The Terror of the Saibaimen" / "The Saibamen Strike" [Saibamen Attack!] Transliteration: "Yamucha Shisu! Osoru Beshi Saibaiman" (Japanese: ヤムチャ死す！おそるべしサイバイマン)	Yoshihiro Ueda	Takao Koyama	Katsumi Aoshima	October 18, 1989	February 8, 1997; July 21, 2005 (re-dub)
24	18	"Farewell Ten-san! Chaozu's Suicide Strategy" / "Nappa... The Invincible?" [The Power of Nappa] Transliteration: "Sayonara Tensan! Chaozu no Sutemi no Senpō" (Japanese: さよなら天さん！餃子の捨て身の戦法)	Tatsuya Orime; Storyboarded by : Osamu Kasai	Katsuyuki Sumisawa	Mitsuo Shindō	October 25, 1989	February 15, 1997; July 25, 2005 (re-dub)
25	19	"Tenshinhan Cries Out!! This is My Final Kikoho" / "Tien Goes All Out!!" [Sacrifice] Transliteration: "Tenshinhan Zekkyō!! Kore ga Saigo no Kikōhō Da" (Japanese: 天津飯絶叫!!これが最後の気功砲だ)	Daisuke Nishio	Hiroshi Toda	Tomekichi Takeuchi	November 1, 1989	February 22, 1997; July 26, 2005 (re-dub)
26	19	"An Intense Three-Hour Delay! The Kinto Un Bullet-Express" / "Tien Goes All Out!!" [Nappa's Rampage] Transliteration: "Hitasura Matte Sanjikan! Dangan Hikō no Kintoun" (Japanese: ひたすら待って3時間！弾丸飛行の筋斗雲)	Yoshihiro Ueda; Storyboarded by : Kazuhisa Takenouchi	Takao Koyama	Masayuki Uchiyama	November 8, 1989	February 22, 1997; July 27, 2005 (re-dub)
27	20	"Leave it to Me! Gohan's Great Burst of Anger" / "Time's Up!" [Nimbus Speed] Transliteration: "Boku ni Makasete! Gohan - Ikari no Daibakuhatsu" (Japanese: ぼくにまかせて！悟飯・怒りの大爆発)	Mitsuo Hashimoto	Toshiki Inoue	Yukio Ebisawa	November 22, 1989	April 12, 1997; July 28, 2005 (re-dub)
28	21	"Ferocity of the Saiyans! Kami-sama and Piccolo Both Die" / "The Return of Goku" [Goku's Arrival] Transliteration: "Saiyajin no Mōi! Kamisama mo Pikkoro mo Shinda" (Japanese: サイヤ人の猛威！神様もピッコロも死んだ)	Minoru Okazaki	Hiroshi Toda	Minoru Maeda	November 29, 1989	April 19, 1997; August 1, 2005 (re-dub)
29	22	"Father is Awesome! Kaio-ken, the Ultimate Finishing Technique" / "Goku Strikes Back" [Lesson Number One] Transliteration: "Tōsan Sugē ya! Kyūkyoku no Hissatsuwaza - Kaiōken" (Japanese: 父さんすげぇや！究極の必殺技・界王拳)	Yoshihiro Ueda	Katsuyuki Sumisawa	Masayuki Uchiyama	December 6, 1989	April 26, 1997; August 2, 2005 (re-dub)
30	23	"A Hot, Unbounded Battle! Goku vs. Vegeta" / "Goku vs. Vegeta... A Saiyan Duel!" [Goku vs. Vegeta] Transliteration: "Genkai o Koeta Atsui Tatakai! Gokū Tai Bejīta" (Japanese: 限界を超えた熱い戦い！悟空対ベジータ)	Tatsuya Orime	Keiji Terui	Katsumi Aoshima	December 13, 1989	May 3, 1997; August 3, 2005 (re-dub)
31	23	"Now, Goku! A Final Technique with Everything on the Line" / "Goku vs. Vegeta... A Saiyan Duel!" [Saiyan Sized Secret] Transliteration: "Ima da Gokū! Subete o Kaketa Saigo no Ōwaza" (Japanese: いまだ悟空！すべてを賭けた最後の大技)	Daisuke Nishio	Toshiki Inoue	Tomekichi Takeuchi	December 20, 1989	May 3, 1997; August 4, 2005 (re-dub)
32	24	"Battle Power Times Ten!! Vegeta's Great Metamorphosis" / "Vegeta... Saiyan Style!" [Spirit Bomb Away!] Transliteration: "Sentōryoku Jūbai!! Bejīta Daihenshin" (Japanese: 戦闘力10倍!!ベジータ大変身)	Yoshihiro Ueda	Katsuyuki Sumisawa	Masayuki Uchiyama	January 17, 1990	May 10, 1997; August 8, 2005 (re-dub)
33	25	"Don't Die, Father!! This is the Depth of Gohan's Power" / "Stop Vegeta Now!" [Hero in the Shadows] Transliteration: "Shinanaide Tōsan!! Kore ga Gohan no Sokojikara" (Japanese: 死なないで父さん!!これが悟飯の底力)	Mitsuo Hashimoto	Keiji Terui	Yukio Ebisawa	January 24, 1990	May 17, 1997; August 9, 2005 (re-dub)
34	25	"Shoot, Kuririn! The Genki Dama, Packed with Hope" / "Stop Vegeta Now!" [Krillin's Offensive] Transliteration: "Ute Kuririn! Negai o Kometa Genkidama" (Japanese: 撃てクリリン！願いをこめた元気玉)	Minoru Okazaki	Takao Koyama	Minoru Maeda	January 31, 1990	May 17, 1997; August 10, 2005 (re-dub)
35	26	"Cause a Miracle! Son Gohan, the Super Saiyan" / "The Battle Ends" [Mercy] Transliteration: "Kiseki o Okose! Sūpā Saiyajin Son Gohan" (Japanese: 奇跡を起こせ！スーパーサイヤ人孫悟飯)	Daisuke Nishio	Hiroshi Toda	Masayuki Uchiyama	February 7, 1990	May 24, 1997; August 11, 2005 (re-dub)
36	27	"We're Off Into Space! The Star of Hope is Piccolo's Homeland" / "A New Goal... Namek" [Picking Up the Pieces] Transliteration: "Tobidase Uchū e! Kibō no Hoshi wa Pikkoro no Furusato" (Japanese: 飛び出せ宇宙へ！希望の星はピッコロの故郷)	Tatsuya Orime	Katsuyuki Sumisawa	Tomekichi Takeuchi	February 14, 1990	September 13, 1997; August 15, 2005 (re-dub)
37	27	"Mysterious Yunzabit! The Search for Kami-sama's Spaceship" / "A New Goal... Namek" [Plans for Departure] Transliteration: "Nazo no Yunzabitto! Kamisama no Uchūsen o Sagase" (Japanese: 謎のユンザビット！神様の宇宙船を探せ)	Jōhei Matsuura	Katsuyuki Sumisawa	Mitsuo Shindō	February 21, 1990	September 13, 1997; August 16, 2005 (re-dub)
38	28	"Blast-off for Planet Namek! The Terror Awaiting Gohan & Co." / "Journey to Namek" [Nursing Wounds] Transliteration: "Namekkusei Iki Hasshin! Gohantachi o Matsu Kyōfu" (Japanese: ナメック星行き発進！悟飯たちを待つ恐怖)	Yoshihiro Ueda	Keiji Terui	Masayuki Uchiyama	February 28, 1990	September 13, 1997; August 17, 2005 (re-dub)
39	28	"Friends or Foes? Children of the Mysterious Giant Spaceship" / "Journey to Namek" [Friends or Foes?] Transliteration: "Teki ka Mikata ka? Nazo no Kyodai Uchūsen no Kodomotachi" (Japanese: 敵か味方か？謎の巨大宇宙船の子供たち)	Daisuke Nishio	Takao Koyama	Yukio Ebisawa	March 7, 1990	September 13, 1997; August 18, 2005 (re-dub)

=== Season 2: Namek and Captain Ginyu Sagas (1990–1991) ===
No. overall	Initial dub no.	Translated title/Original North American dub title[North American re-dub title] Original Japanese title	Directed by	Written by	Animation directed by	Original release date	English air date
40	29	"Honest to Goodness? There Lies Namek, Planet of Hope" / "Friends or Foes?" [Held Captive] Transliteration: "Honto ni Honto? Are ga Kibō no Namekkusei" (Japanese: ホントにホント？あれが希望のナメック星)	Mitsuo Hashimoto	Katsuyuki Sumisawa	Tomekichi Takeuchi	March 14, 1990	September 20, 1997; August 22, 2005 (re-dub)
41	29	"Kind-hearted Aliens — There's the Six Star Ball Already" / "Friends or Foes?" [Look Out Below] Transliteration: "Shinsetsu na Uchūjin — Ikinari Atta yo Ūshinchū" (Japanese: 親切な宇宙人いきなりあったよ五星球)	Minoru Okazaki	Keiji Terui	Minoru Maeda	March 21, 1990	September 20, 1997; August 23, 2005 (re-dub)
42	30	"Planet Freeza No. 79 — Vegeta Recovers!!" / "Hunt for a Dragon Ball" [The Search Continues] Transliteration: "Wakusei Furīza Sebunti Nain — Fukkatsu no Bejīta!!" (Japanese: 惑星フリーザNO.79復活のベジータ!!)	Jōhei Matsuura	Aya Matsui & Takao Koyama	Masayuki Uchiyama	April 4, 1990	September 20, 1997; August 24, 2005 (re-dub)
43	31	"The Dragon Balls are All Found! Piccolo-san Will Also Come Back to Life" / "Who's Who?!" [A Friendly Surprise] Transliteration: "Sorotta zo Doragon Bōru! Pikkorosan mo Ikikaeru" (Japanese: そろったぞ神龍球！ピッコロさんも生き返る)	Yoshihiro Ueda	Katsuyuki Sumisawa	Mitsuo Shindō	April 11, 1990	September 27, 1997; August 25, 2005 (re-dub)
44	32	"A Tough New Enemy! Freeza, Emperor of the Universe" / "Touchdown on Namek" [Brood of Evil] Transliteration: "Arata na Kyōteki! Uchū no Teiō Furīza" (Japanese: あらたな強敵！宇宙の帝王フリーザ)	Tatsuya Orime	Keiji Terui	Katsuyoshi Nakatsuru	April 18, 1990	September 27, 1997; August 29, 2005 (re-dub)
45	33	"Vegeta's Ambition! I am the Greatest Warrior in the Universe!!" / "Face-off on Namek" [Frieza Strikes!] Transliteration: "Yabō no Bejīta! Uchūichi no Senshi wa Ore Da!!" (Japanese: 野望のベジータ！宇宙一の戦士はオレだ!!)	Yamauchi Shigeyasu	Katsuyuki Sumisawa	Masayuki Uchiyama	April 25, 1990	October 4, 1997; August 30, 2005 (re-dub)
46	34	"Goku's Power Unleashed!! Six Days to the Far End of the Galaxy" / "The Ruthless Frieza" [Defying Orders] Transliteration: "Gokū Pawā Zenkai!! Ginga no Hate made Muikakan" (Japanese: 悟空パワー全開!!銀河の果てまで6日間)	Mitsuo Hashimoto	Hiroshi Toda	Yukio Ebisawa	May 2, 1990	October 4, 1997; August 31, 2005 (re-dub)
47	35	"Surprise Attack!! The Elder's Target was the Scouters" / "The Nameks versus Frieza" [Namek's Defense] Transliteration: "Ihyō o Tsuita Kōgeki!! Chōrō no Nerai wa Sukautā" (Japanese: 意表をついた攻撃!!長老の狙いはスカウター)	Yoshihiro Ueda	Aya Matsui	Tomekichi Takeuchi	May 9, 1990	October 11, 1997; September 1, 2005 (re-dub)
48	36	"Gohan in Peril! A Pursuing Dodoria Summons Death" / "Escape from Dodoria" [The Hunted] Transliteration: "Gohan Ayaushi! Shi o Yobu Tsuisekisha Dodoria" (Japanese: 悟飯危うし！死を呼ぶ追跡者ドドリア)	Minoru Okazaki	Keiji Terui	Minoru Maeda	May 16, 1990	October 11, 1997; September 5, 2005 (re-dub)
49	37	"Dodoria Dies by Explosion! Vegeta's Fearsome Shockwave" / "Secrets Revealed" [The Prince Fights Back] Transliteration: "Bakushi Dodoria! Bejīta no Osoru Beki Shōgekiha" (Japanese: 爆死ドドリア！ベジータの恐るべき衝撃波)	Yamauchi Shigeyasu	Katsuyuki Sumisawa	Masayuki Uchiyama	May 23, 1990	October 18, 1997; September 6, 2005 (re-dub)
50	38	"Escape From a Burning Planet!! A Life-or-Death Kamehame-Ha" / "A Collision Course" [Unexpected Problem] Transliteration: "Moeru Wakusei kara no Dasshutsu!! Inochigake no Kamehameha" (Japanese: 燃える惑星からの脱出!!命がけのカメハメ波)	Mitsuo Hashimoto	Hiroshi Toda	Mitsuo Shindō	May 30, 1990	October 18, 1997; September 7, 2005 (re-dub)
51	39	"Courage Times One Hundred! The Warriors Gathered Under Kaio" / "Stay Away From Frieza" [Vegeta Has a Ball] Transliteration: "Yūki Hyakubai! Kaiō no Moto ni Shūketsu Suru Senshitachi" (Japanese: 勇気百倍！界王の下に集結する戦士たち)	Yoshihiro Ueda	Aya Matsui	Yukio Ebisawa	June 6, 1990	October 25, 1997; September 12, 2005 (re-dub)
52	39	"Listen to Me, Goku! Hands Off Freeza" / "Stay Away From Frieza" [The Past and Future] Transliteration: "Kike Gokū yo! Furīza ni wa Te o Dasu na" (Japanese: 聞け悟空よ！フリーザには手を出すな)	Mitsuo Hashimoto	Katsuyuki Sumisawa	Mitsuo Shindō	June 20, 1990	October 25, 1997; September 13, 2005 (re-dub)
53	40	"Nothing but Goosebumps! The Handsome Warrior Zarbon's Devilish Transformation" / "Zarbon Transformed" [Zarbon's Surprise] Transliteration: "Hotondo Torihada! Bisenshi Zābon no Akuma no Henshin" (Japanese: ほとんど鳥肌！美戦士ザーボンの悪魔の変身)	Yamauchi Shigeyasu	Hiroshi Toda	Masayuki Uchiyama	June 27, 1990	October 25, 1997; September 14, 2005 (re-dub)
54	41	"Defend the Star of Hope!! Kuririn's Astonishing Power-Up" / "The Eldest Namek" [Guru's Gift] Transliteration: "Kibō no Hoshi o Mamore!! Kuririn Kyōi no Pawā Appu" (Japanese: 希望の星を守れ!!クリリン驚異のパワーUP)	Minoru Okazaki	Keiji Terui	Tomekichi Takeuchi	July 4, 1990	November 1, 1997; September 15, 2005 (re-dub)
55	42	"Back from the Brink of Death — The Miracle Man, Vegeta" / "Get Vegeta!" [Piccolo vs. Everyone] Transliteration: "Shi no Fuchi kara Yomigaetta — Kiseki no Otoko - Bejīta" (Japanese: 死の淵からよみがえった奇跡の男・ベジータ)	Tatsuya Orime	Keiji Terui	Masayuki Uchiyama	July 18, 1990	November 1, 1997; September 19, 2005 (re-dub)
56	43	"An Enormous Battle Power!! Freeza's Scheme is Shattered" / "Vegeta Revived" [Zarbon's Mission] Transliteration: "Dodekai Sentōryoku!! Kudakechiru Furīza no Inbō" (Japanese: どでかい戦闘力!!砕け散るフリーザの陰謀)	Yoshihiro Ueda	Katsuyuki Sumisawa	Yukio Ebisawa	August 1, 1990	November 8, 1997; September 20, 2005 (re-dub)
57	44	"I'm Back to My Old Self Again!! Goku Under 100-Times Super-Gravity" / "A Heavy Burden" [Gohan, the Hunted] Transliteration: "Genki ga Modotta zo!! Hyakubai Chōjūryoku no Naka no Gokū" (Japanese: 元気が戻ったぞ!!100倍超重力の中の悟空)	Yamauchi Shigeyasu	Takao Koyama	Mitsuo Shindō	August 8, 1990	November 8, 1997; September 21, 2005 (re-dub)
58	45	"Freeza's Secret Weapon! The Devilish Ginyu Special Corps" / "Immortality Denied" [Unknown Enemies] Transliteration: "Furīza no Himitsu Heiki! Akuma no Ginyū Tokusentai" (Japanese: フリーザの秘密兵器！悪魔のギニュー特戦隊)	Mitsuo Hashimoto	Hiroshi Toda	Tomekichi Takeuchi	August 22, 1990	November 15, 1997; September 22, 2005 (re-dub)
N–A	46 (Episodic Version of a Dragon Ball Z Movie of the same name)	"The Decisive Battle for the Entire Earth" / "The Tree of Might: Episode 1"; Transliteration: "Chikyū Marugoto Chōkessen" (Japanese: 地球まるごと超決戦)	Daisuke Nishio; Storyboarded by : Daisuke Nishio, Shigeyasu Yamauchi, Yoshihiro Ueda, Mitsuo Hashimoto & Tatsuya Orime	Takao Koyama	Minoru Maeda	N/A	November 15, 1997
N–A	47 (Episodic Version of a Dragon Ball Z Movie of the same name)	"The Decisive Battle for the Entire Earth" / "The Tree of Might: Episode 2"; Transliteration: "Chikyū Marugoto Chōkessen" (Japanese: 地球まるごと超決戦)	Daisuke Nishio; Storyboarded by : Daisuke Nishio, Shigeyasu Yamauchi, Yoshihiro Ueda, Mitsuo Hashimoto & Tatsuya Orime	Takao Koyama	Minoru Maeda	N/A	November 22, 1997
N–A	48 (Episodic Version of a Dragon Ball Z Movie of the same name)	"The Decisive Battle for the Entire Earth" / "The Tree of Might: Episode 3"; Transliteration: "Chikyū Marugoto Chōkessen" (Japanese: 地球まるごと超決戦)	Daisuke Nishio; Storyboarded by : Daisuke Nishio, Shigeyasu Yamauchi, Yoshihiro Ueda, Mitsuo Hashimoto & Tatsuya Orime	Takao Koyama	Minoru Maeda	N/A	November 22, 1997
59	46	"Watch Out, Bulma!! The Si Xing Qiu Falls into Freeza's Clutches" / "Big Trouble for Bulma" [Destination: Guru] Transliteration: "Buruma ga Abunai!! Sūshinchū wa Furīza no Te ni" (Japanese: ブルマが危ない!!四星球はフリーザの手に)	Jōhei Matsuura	Aya Matsui	Masayuki Uchiyama	August 29, 1990	January 31, 1998; September 26, 2005 (re-dub)
60	47	"Charge!! The Kaio-ken and Kamehame-Ha of an Indomitable Spirit" / "Scramble for the Dragon Balls!" [Bulma's Big Day] Transliteration: "Gekitotsu da!! Fukutsu no Tōshi no Kaiōken to Kamehameha" (Japanese: 激突だ!!不屈の闘志の界王拳とカメハメ波)	Yoshihiro Ueda	Katsuyuki Sumisawa	Mitsuo Shindō	September 5, 1990	February 7, 1998; September 27, 2005 (re-dub)
61	48	"The Great Battle Approaches! Ginyu's Special Corps Takes the Stage!!" / "Arrival of the Ginyu Force" [Hidden Power] Transliteration: "Semaru Chō-Kessen! Ginyū Tokusentai Tadaima Sanjō!!" (Japanese: 迫る超決戦！ギニュー特戦隊只今参上!!)	Tatsuya Orime	Katsuyuki Sumisawa	Yukio Ebisawa	September 12, 1990	February 7, 1998; September 28, 2005 (re-dub)
62	49	"Goku on Final Approach! Smash Through Freeza's Dragnet" / "Elite Fighters of the Universe... The Ginyu Force" [New Ally, New Problem] Transliteration: "Gokū ga Daisekkin! Furīza no Hōimō o Buchiyabure" (Japanese: 悟空が大接近！フリーザの包囲網をぶち破れ)	Jun'ichi Fujise; Storyboarded by : Yamauchi Shigeyasu	Keiji Terui	Masayuki Uchiyama	September 19, 1990	February 14, 1998; September 29, 2005 (re-dub)
63	50	"Super-Magic or Just a Trick!? Mr. Ghurd is Angry!" / "Time Tricks and Body Binds" [Guldo's Mind Binds] Transliteration: "Chōmajutsu ka Torikku ka!? Misutā Gurudo ga Okotta zo!" (Japanese: 超魔術かトリックか!?Mr.グルドが怒ったぞ！)	Kazuhito Kikuchi	Hiroshi Toda	Tomekichi Takeuchi	September 26, 1990	February 14, 1998; October 3, 2005 (re-dub)
64	51	"The Savage ReaCoom!! He's Bad, He's Strong, He's Outrageous" / "No Refuge From Recoome" [Recoome Unleashed] Transliteration: "Mōi Rikūmu!! Warukute Tsuyokute Tondemonai Yatsu" (Japanese: 猛攻リクーム!!悪くて強くてとんでもない奴)	Minoru Okazaki	Hiroshi Toda	Masaki Satô	October 24, 1990	May 16, 1998; October 4, 2005 (re-dub)
65	52	"Don't Die, Gohan! Goku Finally Touches Down on the Battlefield" / "Enter Goku" [Let the Battle Begin] Transliteration: "Shinu na Gohan! Gokū, Tsui ni Kessenjō ni Tōchaku Da" (Japanese: 死ぬな悟飯！悟空、ついに決戦場に到着だ)	Yoshihiro Ueda	Katsuyuki Sumisawa	Mitsuo Shindō	October 31, 1990	May 23, 1998; October 5, 2005 (re-dub)
66	53	"Uncommon Strength!! Son Goku, the Legendary Super Saiyan" / "Goku... Super Saiyan?" [Goku's New Power] Transliteration: "Ketahazure no Tsuyosa!! Densetsu no Sūpā Saiyajin Son Gokū" (Japanese: ケタ外れの強さ!!伝説の超サイヤ人孫悟空)	Tatsuya Orime	Katsuyuki Sumisawa	Yukio Ebisawa	November 7, 1990	May 23, 1998; October 6, 2005 (re-dub)
67	53	"Lightning Balls of Red and Blue! Jheese and Butta Attack Goku" / "Goku... Super Saiyan?" [A Legend Revealed] Transliteration: "Aka to Ao no Raitoningu Bōru! Jīsu to Bāta ga Gokū o Osō" (Japanese: 赤と青の光球！ジースとバータが悟空を襲う)	Daisuke Nishio	Aya Matsui	Masayuki Uchiyama	November 14, 1990	May 23, 1998; October 10, 2005 (re-dub)
68	54	"At Last, a Direct Confrontation!! Captain Ginyu Takes the Field" [Ginyu Assault] Transliteration: "Tsui ni Chokusetsu Taiketsu!! Ginyū Taichō no Odemashi Da" (Japanese: ついに直接対決!!ギニュー隊長のおでましだ)	Jun'ichi Fujise	Keiji Terui	Masahiro Shimanuki	November 21, 1990	September 13, 1999
69	55	"Incredible Force!! Did You See Goku's Full Power?" [Incredible Force!] Transliteration: "Susamajii Hakuryoku!! Mita ka, Gokū no Furu Pawā" (Japanese: 凄まじい迫力!!見たか、悟空のフルパワー)	Minoru Okazaki	Aya Matsui	Mitsuo Shindō	November 28, 1990	September 13, 1999
70	56	"What of the Battle's Outcome!? Freeza's Evil Hand Closes Around the Grand Elder" [Frieza Approaches] Transliteration: "Tatakai no Yukue!? Saichōrō ni Semaru Furīza no Ma no Te" (Japanese: 闘いの行方!?最長老に迫るフリーザの魔の手)	Yoshihiro Ueda	Aya Matsui	Minoru Maeda	December 5, 1990	September 14, 1999
71	57	"Surprise!! Goku is Ginyu and Ginyu is Goku" [Goku is Ginyu and Ginyu is Goku] Transliteration: "Bikkuri!! Gokū ga Ginyū de Ginyū ga Gokū" (Japanese: ビックリ!!悟空がギニューでギニューが悟空)	Tatsuya Orime	Aya Matsui	Yukio Ebisawa	December 12, 1990	September 15, 1999
72	58	"Come Forth, Super Shen Long!! Grant Me My Wish" [Calling the Eternal Dragon] Transliteration: "Ide yo Sūpā Shenron!! Boku no Negai o Kanaetamae" (Japanese: 出でよ超神龍!!ボクの願いをかなえたまえ)	Mitsuo Hashimoto	Aya Matsui	Masayuki Uchiyama	December 19, 1990	September 16, 1999
73	59	"That Ain't Me! Gohan, Don't Lose Your Nerve, Hit Your Father!!" [Gohan, Defeat Your Dad!] Transliteration: "Yatsu wa Ora ja Nē! Gohan Bibiru na Chichi o Ute!!" (Japanese: 奴はオラじゃネェ！悟飯びびるな父を撃て!!)	Daisuke Nishio	Hiroshi Toda	Mitsuo Shindō	January 9, 1991	September 17, 1999
74	60	"Whoops!! Ginyu Has Turned Into a Frog" [Captain Ginyu... The Frog] Transliteration: "Daigosan!! Ginyū ga Kaeru ni Natchatta" (Japanese: 大誤算!!ギニューがカエルになっちゃった)	Yoshihiro Ueda	Katsuyuki Sumisawa	Masayuki Uchiyama	January 16, 1991	September 20, 1999

=== Season 3: Frieza Saga (1991) ===
No. overall	Initial dub no.	Translated title/Funimation's dub title Original Japanese title	Directed by	Written by	Animation directed by	Original release date	English air date
75	61	"Thou Who Hast Gathered the Seven Balls... Now Speak Forth the Password!" / "Password is Porunga"; Transliteration: "Nanatsu no Tama o Soroeshi Mono yo... Sā Aikotoba o Ie!" (Japanese: 七ッの玉を揃えし者よ…さあ合言葉を言え！)	Mitsuo Hashimoto	Katsuyuki Sumisawa	Yukio Ebisawa	January 23, 1991	September 21, 1999
76	62	"Kami-sama Also Returns to Life! Piccolo is Resurrected by Super Shen Long" / "Piccolo's Return"; Transliteration: "Kamisama mo Ikikaetta! Sūpā Shen Long de Pikkoro ga Fukkatsu" (Japanese: 神様も生き返った！超神龍でピッコロが復活)	Tatsuya Orime	Katsuyuki Sumisawa	Masahiro Shimanuki	January 30, 1991	September 22, 1999
77	63	"Birth of the Mightiest Warrior!? Nail and Piccolo Merge" / "The Fusion"; Transliteration: "Saikyō Senshi no Tanjō ka!? Neiru to Pikkoro ga Gattai" (Japanese: 最強戦士の誕生か!?ネイルとピッコロが合体)	Minoru Okazaki	Katsuyuki Sumisawa	Minoru Maeda	February 6, 1991	September 23, 1999
78	64	"A Nightmare Super-Transformation!! Frieza's Battle Power of One Million" / "Fighting Power: One Million?"; Transliteration: "Akumu no Chōhenshin!! Sentōryoku Hyakuman no Furīza" (Japanese: 悪夢の超変身!!戦闘力100万のフリーザ)	Yoshihiro Ueda	Katsuyuki Sumisawa	Mitsuo Shindō	February 13, 1991	September 24, 1999
79	65a	"Is This the End!? A Brutally Transcendent Power Attacks Gohan" / "Gohan Attacks"; Transliteration: "Koko made ka!? Kyōaku Chōzetsu Pawā ga Gohan o Osō" (Japanese: ここまでか!?凶悪超絶パワーが悟飯を襲う)	Tatsuya Orime	Aya Matsui	Masayuki Uchiyama	February 20, 1991	September 27, 1999
80	65b	"The Tide Suddenly Turned!! Piccolo, the Warrior Who Came Late" / "Piccolo the Super-Namek"; Transliteration: "Ikki ni Keisei Gyakuten!! Okurete Kita Senshi - Pikkoro" (Japanese: 一気に形勢逆転!!遅れてきた戦士・ピッコロ)	Jun'ichi Fujise	Aya Matsui	Mitsuo Shindō	February 27, 1991	September 27, 1999
81	66	"Piccolo's Self-Confidence! I Will Be the One to Defeat Freeza" / "Deja Vu"; Transliteration: "Pikkoro no Jishin! Furīza o Taosu no wa Ore da" (Japanese: ピッコロの自信！フリーザを倒すのはオレだ)	Yoshihiro Ueda; Storyboarded by : Daisuke Nishio	Takao Koyama	Masahiro Shimanuki	March 6, 1991	September 28, 1999
82	67	"Attack, Goku!! An Enraged Freeza's Second Transformation" / "Frieza's Second Transformation"; Transliteration: "Shutsugeki da Gokū!! Gekido no Furīza ga Daini no Henshin" (Japanese: 出撃だ悟空!!激怒のフリーザが第2の変身)	Kazuhito Kikuchi	Takao Koyama	Mitsuo Shindō	March 13, 1991	September 29, 1999
83	68	"Fear Me!! Freeza Does Battle with a Third Transformation" / "Another Transformation?"; Transliteration: "Kyōfu Shiro!! Furīza wa Sando no Henshin de Shōbu Suru" (Japanese: 恐怖しろ!!フリーザは3度の変身で勝負する)	Yoshihiro Ueda	Katsuyuki Sumisawa	Masayuki Uchiyama	March 20, 1991	September 30, 1999
84	69	"The Death of Dende... Come Forth! Intense, Wide-Open Power" / "Dende's Demise"; Transliteration: "Dende no Shi... Dete Koi! Tobikiri Zenkai Pawā" (Japanese: デンデの死…でてこい！とびきり全開パワー)	Tatsuya Orime	Katsuyuki Sumisawa	Yukio Ebisawa	March 27, 1991	October 1, 1999
85	70	"How I've Waited for this Moment!!! Son Goku Revived" / "The Renewed Goku"; Transliteration: "Machi ni Matta ze, Kono Shunkan!!! Son Gokū ga Fukkatsu da" (Japanese: 待ちに待ったぜ、この瞬間!!!孫悟空が復活だ)	Kazuhito Kikuchi	Katsuyuki Sumisawa	Masayuki Uchiyama	April 3, 1991	October 4, 1999
86	71	"Such Regret...!! Vegeta, Pride of the Saiyans, Dies" / "The End of Vegeta"; Transliteration: "Munen...!! Hokori Takaki Saiyajin Bejīta Shisu" (Japanese: 無念…!!誇り高きサイヤ人・ベジータ死す)	Yoshihiro Ueda	Katsuyuki Sumisawa	Mitsuo Shindō	April 10, 1991	October 5, 1999
87	72	"The Curtain Rises over the Ultimate Battle!! I Am Going to Defeat You!" / "The Ultimate Battle"; Transliteration: "Chō Kessen no Makuake da!! Omēdake wa Ora ga Taosu" (Japanese: 超決戦の幕開けだ!!おめえだけはオラが倒す)	Akihiko Yamaguchi; Storyboarded by : Harume Kosaka	Aya Matsui	Masahiro Shimanuki	April 17, 1991	October 6, 1999
88	73	"The Two Superpowers Collide! A Fistfight Where Both Turn Serious!!!" / "Clash of the Super Powers"; Transliteration: "Gekitotsu no Ni Dai Chō Pawā! Honki Dōshi no Nikudan Sen!!!" (Japanese: 激突の2大超パワー！本気同士の肉弾戦!!!)	Kazuhito Kikuchi	Aya Matsui	Masayuki Uchiyama	April 24, 1991	October 7, 1999
89	74	"Freeza's Terrible Declaration! I Will Defeat You Without Using My Hands" / "Frieza's Boast"; Transliteration: "Furīza Kyōfu no Sengen! Te o Tsukawazu Omae o Taosu" (Japanese: フリーザ恐怖の宣言！手を使わずお前を倒す)	Yoshihiro Ueda; Storyboarded by : Kazuhisa Takenouchi	Aya Matsui	Yukio Ebisawa	May 1, 1991	October 8, 1999
90	75	"That Was No Idle Boast!! Son Goku, an Audacious, Wonderful Guy" / "Bold and Fearless"; Transliteration: "Hattari ja nē zo!! Daitan Suteki na Yatsu - Son Gokū" (Japanese: ハッタリじゃねえぞ!!大胆素敵な奴・孫悟空)	Yoshihiro Ueda	Aya Matsui	Minoru Maeda	May 8, 1991	October 11, 1999
91	76	"Showdown!! The Embodiment of Flame in a 20-Times Kaio-ken Kamehame-Ha" / "Embodiment of Fire"; Transliteration: "Ketchaku da!! Honō no Keshin Nijūbai Kaiōken no Kamehameha" (Japanese: 決着だ!!炎の化身20倍界王拳のカメハメ波)	Jun'ichi Fujise; Storyboarded by : Daisuke Nishio	Aya Matsui	Mitsuo Shindō	May 15, 1991	October 12, 1999
92	77	"A Super-Huge Genki Dama — I'm Playing My Last Card!!" / "Trump Card"; Transliteration: "Chō Tokudai no Genki Dama Kore ga Saikyō no Kirifuda da!!" (Japanese: 超特大の元気玉これが最後の切り札だ!!)	Mitsuo Hashimoto	Hiroshi Toda	Masayuki Uchiyama	May 22, 1991	October 13, 1999
93	78	"Keep the Chance Alive!! Piccolo's Suicide Support Strike" / "Keep the Chance Alive!!"; Transliteration: "Chansu o Ikase!! Pikkoro Sutemi no Engo Shageki" (Japanese: チャンスを生かせ!!ピッコロ捨身の援護射撃)	Kazuhito Kikuchi	Hiroshi Toda	Masahiro Shimanuki	May 29, 1991	October 14, 1999
94	79	"The Incredible Destructive Force of the Genki Dama!! Who Will Survive?!" / "Power of the Spirit"; Transliteration: "Genki Dama no Chō Hakairyoku!! Ikinokotta no wa Dare da!?" (Japanese: 元気玉の超破壊力!!生き残ったのは誰だ!?)	Yoshihiro Ueda	Hiroshi Toda	Yukio Ebisawa	June 5, 1991	October 15, 1999
95	80	"Transformed At Last!! Son Goku, the Legendary Super Saiyan" / "Transformed at Last"; Transliteration: "Tsui ni Henshin!! Densetsu no Sūpā Saiyajin Son Gokū" (Japanese: ついに変身!!伝説の超サイヤ人・孫悟空)	Yamauchi Shigeyasu	Hiroshi Toda	Minoru Maeda	June 12, 1991	October 18, 1999
96	81	"An Explosion of Anger!! Goku, Avenge Everyone's Deaths" / "Explosion of Anger"; Transliteration: "Ikari Bakuhatsu!! Gokū yo, Minna no Kataki o Uttekure" (Japanese: 怒り爆発!!悟空よ、みんなの仇を討ってくれ)	Jun'ichi Fujise	Katsuyuki Sumisawa	Masayuki Uchiyama	June 19, 1991	October 19, 1999
97	82	"The Destruction of Planet Namek!? A Demonic Flash Pierces the Ground" / "Namek's Destruction?"; Transliteration: "Namekkusei Shōmetsu ka!? Daichi o Tsuranuku Ma no Senkō" (Japanese: ナメック星消滅か!?大地を貫く魔の閃光)	Kazuhito Kikuchi	Katsuyuki Sumisawa	Mitsuo Shindō	June 26, 1991	October 20, 1999
98	83	"I Will Be the One Who Wins... Risking Survival, a Final Attack" / "A Final Attack"; Transliteration: "Katsu no wa Ore Da... Ikinokori o Kaketa Saishū Kōgeki" (Japanese: 勝つのはオレだ…生き残りをかけた最終攻撃)	Yoshihiro Ueda	Katsuyuki Sumisawa	Kazuya Hisada	July 10, 1991	October 21, 1999
99	84	"Shen Long, Run Yourself Through Space!! The Time of Namek's Destruction Draws Near" / "Approaching Destruction"; Transliteration: "Shen Long yo Uchū o Hashire!! Semaru Namekkusei Shōmetsu no Toki" (Japanese: 神龍よ宇宙を走れ!!迫るナメック星消滅の時)	Yamauchi Shigeyasu	Katsuyuki Sumisawa	Yukio Ebisawa	July 17, 1991	October 22, 1999
100	85	"I Am Son Goku's Son!! Gohan Returns to the Battlefield" / "Gohan Returns"; Transliteration: "Boku wa Son Gokū no Musuko da!! Gohan, Futatabi Kessenjō e" (Japanese: ボクは孫悟空の息子だ!!悟飯、再び決戦場へ)	Jun'ichi Fujise; Storyboarded by : Mitsuo Hashimoto	Katsuyuki Sumisawa	Masayuki Uchiyama	July 24, 1991	October 25, 1999
101	86	"I'm Staying on This Planet!! A Final Wish Towards Victory" / "The Last Wish"; Transliteration: "Ore wa Kono Hoshi ni Nokoru!! Shōri e no Saigo no Negai" (Japanese: オレはこの星に残る!!勝利への最後の願い)	Kazuhito Kikuchi	Takao Koyama	Mitsuo Shindō	July 31, 1991	October 26, 1999
102	87	"Let's Get It On!! Two Remain on a Vanishing Planet" / "Duel on a Vanishing Planet"; Transliteration: "Tokoton Yarōze!! Kieyuku Hoshi ni Nokotta Futari" (Japanese: ととことんやろうぜ!!消えゆく星に残った二人)	Daisuke Nishio	Takao Koyama	Masayuki Uchiyama	August 7, 1991	October 27, 1999
103	88	"Pathos of Freeza! Once He Starts Shaking, He's Unstoppable!!" / "Pathos of Frieza"; Transliteration: "Aware Furīza! Furue Dashitara Tomaranai!!" (Japanese: 哀れフリーザ！震えだしたら止まらない!!)	Yoshihiro Ueda	Hiroshi Toda	Kazuya Hisada	August 14, 1991	October 28, 1999
104	89	"Goku's Declaration of Victory!! As Freeza Destroys Himself..." / "Frieza Defeated!!"; Transliteration: "Gokū no Shōri Sengen da!! Furīza ga Jimetsu suru Toki..." (Japanese: 悟空の勝利宣言だ!!フリーザが自滅する時…)	Yamauchi Shigeyasu	Hiroshi Toda	Yukio Ebisawa	August 21, 1991	October 29, 1999
105	90	"Freeza Defeated!! A Single Blast Packed with a Totality of Rage" / "Mighty Blast of Rage"; Transliteration: "Furīza Yabureru!! Subete no Ikari o Kometa Ichigeki" (Japanese: フリーザ敗れる!!すべての怒りをこめた一撃)	Mitsuo Hashimoto	Hiroshi Toda	Masayuki Uchiyama	August 28, 1991	November 1, 1999
106	91	"Planet Namek's Great Explosion!! Goku Disappears into Space" / "Namek's Explosion... Goku's End?"; Transliteration: "Namekkusei Dai Bakuhatsu!! Uchū ni Kieta Gokū" (Japanese: ナメック星大爆発!!宇宙に消えた悟空)	Kazuhito Kikuchi	Hiroshi Toda	Mitsuo Shindō	September 4, 1991	November 2, 1999
107	92	"Son Goku Survived — The Z Warriors All Resurrected!!" / "Goku's Alive!!"; Transliteration: "Ikiteita Son Gokū Zetto Senshi ga Zen'in Fukkatsu da!!" (Japanese: 生きていた孫悟空Z戦士が全員復活だ!!)	Daisuke Nishio	Hiroshi Toda	Minoru Maeda	September 11, 1991	November 3, 1999

=== Season 4: Garlic Jr., Trunks and Androids Sagas (1991–1992) ===
No. overall	Initial dub no.	Translated title/Funimation's dub title Original Japanese title	Directed by	Written by	Animation directed by	Original release date	English air date
108	93	"Terrible Happenings in Heaven!! Garlic Jr. to Become Kami!?" / "The Heavens Tremble"; Transliteration: "Tenkai ga Taihen da!! Gārikku Junia ga Kami ni Naru!?" (Japanese: 天界が大変だ!!ガーリックJrが神になる!?)	Yoshihiro Ueda	Katsuyuki Sumisawa	Masayuki Uchiyama	September 18, 1991	April 8, 2000
109	94	"Black Mist of Terror...!! Everyone Turns Demonic" / "Black Fog of Terror"; Transliteration: "Kyōfu no Kuroi Kiri...!! Minna Mazoku ni Natchatta" (Japanese: 恐怖の黒い霧…!!みんな魔族になっちゃった)	Yamauchi Shigeyasu	Katsuyuki Sumisawa	Kazuya Hisada	September 25, 1991	April 15, 2000
110	95	"The Heavenly Realm is the Battlefield!! Piccolo Becomes Devilish Again..." / "Battle in Kami's Lookout"; Transliteration: "Tenkai ga Senjō da!! Pikkoro ga Mazoku ni Gyaku Modori..." (Japanese: 天界が戦場だ!!ピッコロが魔族に逆戻り…)	Mitsuo Hashimoto	Katsuyuki Sumisawa	Yukio Ebisawa	October 2, 1991	April 22, 2000
111	96	"Direct Confrontation with Piccolo!! An Angry Masenko in the Heavenly Realm" / "Fight with Piccolo"; Transliteration: "Pikkoro to Kyokusetsu Taiketsu!! Tenkai ni Ikari no Masenkō" (Japanese: ピッコロと直接対決!!天界に怒りの魔せん光)	Kazuhito Kikuchi	Katsuyuki Sumisawa	Mitsuo Shindō	October 9, 1991	April 29, 2000
112	97	"Retrieve Everyone's Minds!! The Ultra Holy Water Resting in the Temple" / "Call for Restoration"; Transliteration: "Minna no Kokoro o Torimodose!! Shinden ni Nemuru Chō Shinsui" (Japanese: みんなの心を取り戻せ!!神殿に眠る超神水)	Jun'ichi Fujise	Katsuyuki Sumisawa	Minoru Maeda	October 16, 1991	May 6, 2000
113	98	"Can't Wait Until Morning!! Kami-sama Determines a Suicidal Course of Action" / "Suicidal Course"; Transliteration: "Asa made Matenai!! Kamisama no Kakugo o Kimeta Kesshikō" (Japanese: 朝まで待てない!!神様の覚悟をきめた決死行)	Yoshihiro Ueda	Katsuyuki Sumisawa	Masayuki Uchiyama	October 23, 1991	May 13, 2000
114	99	"A Battle of Extreme Measures!! Kami-sama Breaks the Covenant" / "Extreme Measures"; Transliteration: "Chō Kageki ni Shōbu da!! Okite Yaburi no Kamisama" (Japanese: 超過激に勝負だ!!掟やぶりの神様)	Yamauchi Shigeyasu	Katsuyuki Sumisawa	Kazuya Hisada	October 30, 1991	May 20, 2000
115	100	"The Ultra Holy Water Worked!! The World Awakens from Its Nightmare" / "The World Awakens"; Transliteration: "Kiita ze Chō Shinsui!! Sekai ga Akumu kara Sameta" (Japanese: 効いたぜ超神水!!世界が悪夢からさめた)	Mitsuo Hashimoto	Katsuyuki Sumisawa	Yukio Ebisawa	November 6, 1991	May 27, 2000
116	101	"Gohan's Brief Chance for Victory!! Blast the Makyo World..." / "Brief Chance for Victory"; Transliteration: "Gohan ni Isshun no Shōki!! Ano Makyōsei o Ute..." (Japanese: 悟飯に一瞬の勝機!!あの魔凶星を撃て…)	Kazuhito Kikuchi	Katsuyuki Sumisawa	Mitsuo Shindō	November 13, 1991	May 27, 2000
117	102	"You're My Guy... Kuririn — A 101st Proposal" / "Krillin's Proposal"; Transliteration: "Otoko da nē...Kuririn Hyakuikkaime no Puropōzu" (Japanese: 男だねェ…クリリン101回目のプロポーズ)	Daisuke Nishio	Aya Matsui	Minoru Maeda	November 20, 1991	September 1, 2000
118	103	"That There is Earth, Papa... The Counter-Attack of Freeza, Father and Son" / "Frieza's Counterattack"; Transliteration: "Are ga Chikyū dayo Papa... Furīza Oyako no Gyakushū" (Japanese: あれが地球だよパパ…フリーザ親子の逆襲)	Yamauchi Shigeyasu	Takao Koyama	Masayuki Uchiyama	November 27, 1991	September 4, 2000
119	104	"I Will Defeat Freeza... The Mysterious Youth Awaiting Goku" / "The Mysterious Youth"; Transliteration: "Furīza wa Boku ga Taosu... Gokū o Matsu Nazo no Shōnen" (Japanese: フリーザはボクが倒す…悟空を待つ謎の少年)	Yoshihiro Ueda	Aya Matsui	Kazuya Hisada	December 4, 1991	September 5, 2000
120	105	"Freeza Halved by a Single Stroke!! Another Super Saiyan" / "Another Super Saiyan?"; Transliteration: "Furīza o Ittō Ryōdan!! Mō Hitori no Sūpā Saiyajin" (Japanese: フリーザを一刃両断!!もう一人の超サイヤ人)	Mitsuo Hashimoto	Takao Koyama	Katsuyoshi Nakatsuru	December 11, 1991	September 6, 2000
121	106	"Heya!! It's Been a While... Son Goku Returns" / "Welcome Back Goku"; Transliteration: "Ossu!! Hisashiburi... Kaettekita Son Gokū" (Japanese: オッス!!ひさしぶり…帰って来た孫悟空)	Mitsuo Hashimoto; Storyboarded by : Kazuhisa Takenouchi	Hiroshi Toda	Yukio Ebisawa	December 18, 1991	September 7, 2000
122	107	"My Dad is Vegeta... Admissions of the Mysterious Youth" / "Mystery Revealed"; Transliteration: "Boku no Chichi wa Bejīta desu... Nazo no Shōnen no Kokuhaku" (Japanese: ボクの父はベジータです…謎の少年の告白)	Jun'ichi Fujise; Storyboarded by : Kazuhisa Takenouchi	Hiroshi Toda	Tadayoshi Yamamuro	January 8, 1992	September 8, 2000
123	108	"Goku's New Finishing Technique!? Watch My Instantaneous Movement" / "Goku's Special Technique"; Transliteration: "Gokū no Shin Hissatsu Waza!? Mitekure, Ora no Shunkan Idō" (Japanese: 悟空の新必殺技!?見てくれ、オラの瞬間移動)	Yamauchi Shigeyasu	Hiroshi Toda	Masayuki Uchiyama	January 15, 1992	September 11, 2000 (FUNimation) April 2, 2001 (Ocean)
124	109	"I Will Overcome Goku!! The King of the Saiyan Warrior Race" / "Z Warriors Prepare"; Transliteration: "Koeteyaru...Gokū o!! Sentō Minzoku Saiyajin no Ō" (Japanese: こえてやる…悟空を!!戦闘民族サイヤ人の王)	Kazuhito Kikuchi	Aya Matsui	Minoru Maeda	January 22, 1992	September 12, 2000 (FUNimation) April 3, 2001 (Ocean)
125	110	"License Mastery? Goku's Newest Trial" / "Goku's Ordeal"; Transliteration: "Menkyo Kaiden? Gokū no Aratanaru Shiren" (Japanese: 免許皆伝？悟空の新たなる試練)	Yoshihiro Ueda	Aya Matsui	Kazuya Hisada	January 29, 1992	September 13, 2000 (FUNimation) April 4, 2001 (Ocean)
126	111	"Murderers Who Leave No Trace — Which Ones Are the Artificial Humans!?" / "The Androids Appear"; Transliteration: "Kehai o Motanu Satsujinki Doitsu ga Jinzō Ningen da!?" (Japanese: 気配を持たぬ殺人鬼どいつが人造人間だ!?)	Mitsuo Hashimoto	Hiroshi Toda	Yukio Ebisawa	February 5, 1992	September 14, 2000 (FUNimation) April 5, 2001 (Ocean)
127	112	"The Cold-Blooded No. 20's Hideous Atrocities!! Goku's Super Transformation of Anger" / "A Handy Trick"; Transliteration: "Reiketsu Nijūgō no Akugyaku Hidō!! Gokū - Ikari no Chōhenshin" (Japanese: 冷血20号の悪逆非道!!悟空・怒りの超変身)	Jun'ichi Fujise	Katsuyuki Sumisawa	Tadayoshi Yamamuro	February 12, 1992	September 15, 2000 (FUNimation) April 6, 2001 (Ocean)
128	113	"Goku's Double-Shock!! Caught Between Illness and Adversary" / "Double Trouble for Goku"; Transliteration: "Gokū, Daburu Shokku!! Yamai to Teki no Hasamiuchi" (Japanese: 悟空、ダブルショック!!病と敵のはさみ撃ち)	Yamauchi Shigeyasu	Hiroshi Toda	Masayuki Uchiyama	February 19, 1992	September 18, 2000 (FUNimation) April 9, 2001 (Ocean)
129	114	"The Might of Vegeta!! The Blood of a Super Saiyan Awakens" / "Upgrade to Super Saiyan"; Transliteration: "Bejīta Tsuyoshi!! Mezameru Sūpā Saiyajin no Chi" (Japanese: ベジータ強し!!目覚める超サイヤ人の血)	Yoshihiro Ueda	Hiroshi Toda	Takeo Ide	February 26, 1992	September 19, 2000 (FUNimation) April 10, 2001 (Ocean)
130	115	"No. 20's Defiant Smile... The Secret of Doctor Gero" / "The Secret of Dr. Gero"; Transliteration: "Nijūgō no Futeki na Warai... Dokutā Gero no Himitsu" (Japanese: 20号の不敵な笑い…ドクターゲロの秘密)	Kazuhito Kikuchi	Hiroshi Toda	Kazuya Hisada	March 4, 1992	September 20, 2000 (FUNimation) April 11, 2001 (Ocean)
131	116	"A Reality More Terrifying than the Future!? Trunks' Suspicions" / "More Androids?!"; Transliteration: "Jijitsu wa Mirai yori Osoroshii!? Torankusu no Giwaku" (Japanese: 事実は未来より恐ろしい!?トランクスの疑惑)	Mitsuo Hashimoto	Katsuyuki Sumisawa	Yukio Ebisawa	March 11, 1992	September 21, 2000 (FUNimation) April 12, 2001 (Ocean)
132	117	"Give Chase!! The Search for Doctor Gero's Mysterious Laboratory" / "Follow Dr. Gero"; Transliteration: "Tsuigeki!! Dokutā Gero Nazo no Kenkyūjo o Sagashidase" (Japanese: 追撃!!ドクターゲロ謎の研究所を探し出せ)	Yamauchi Shigeyasu	Katsuyuki Sumisawa	Masayuki Uchiyama	March 18, 1992	September 22, 2000 (FUNimation) April 17, 2001 (Ocean)
133	118	"And the Terror Becomes Reality... No. 17 and No. 18 Awaken!!" / "Nightmare Comes True"; Transliteration: "Soshite Kyōfu ga Genjitsu ni... Mezameru Jūnanagō to Jūhachigō!!" (Japanese: そして恐怖が現実に…目覚める17号と18号!!)	Yoshihiro Ueda	Takao Koyama	Tadayoshi Yamamuro	March 25, 1992	September 25, 2000 (FUNimation) April 18, 2001 (Ocean)
134	119	"Too Late to Do Anything!? The Ultimate Weapons to Kill Goku" / "Goku's Assassin"; Transliteration: "Subete ga Teokure ka!? Gokū o Korosu Saishū Heiki" (Japanese: すべてが手遅れか!?悟空を殺す最終兵器)	Jun'ichi Fujise	Takao Koyama	Kazuya Hisada	April 1, 1992	September 26, 2000 (FUNimation) April 19, 2001 (Ocean)
135	120	"Good Looks and Super Power!? No Blind Spot on No. 18" / "Deadly Beauty"; Transliteration: "Kawaii Kao de Chōpawā!? Jūhachigō ni Shikaku Nashi" (Japanese: カワイイ顔で超パワー!?18号に死角なし)	Mitsuo Hashimoto	Aya Matsui	Yukio Ebisawa	April 15, 1992	September 27, 2000 (FUNimation) April 20, 2001 (Ocean)
136	121	"Nobody Is Able to Stop Them... Is This the End of the Z Warriors!?" / "No Match for the Androids"; Transliteration: "Dare nimo Yatsura o Tomerarenai... Zetto Senshi Zenmetsu ka!?" (Japanese: 誰にも奴らを止められない…Z戦士全滅か!?)	Yamauchi Shigeyasu	Hiroshi Toda	Masayuki Uchiyama	April 22, 1992	September 28, 2000 (FUNimation) April 23, 2001 (Ocean)
137	122	"Piccolo's Resolution!! The Last Measure in His Reserve" / "Last Ditch Effort"; Transliteration: "Pikkoro no Ketsui!! Totteoki no Saigo no Shudan" (Japanese: ピッコロの決意!!とっておきの最後の手段)	Kazuhito Kikuchi	Hiroshi Toda	Tadayoshi Yamamuro	April 29, 1992	September 29, 2000 (FUNimation) April 24, 2001 (Ocean)
138	123	"Walking Weapons of Mass Destruction!! The Artificial Humans Draw Near Goku" / "Closing In"; Transliteration: "Aruku Chōhakai Heiki!! Jinzō Ningen ga Gokū ni Semaru" (Japanese: 歩く超破壊兵器!!人造人間が悟空に迫る)	Yoshihiro Ueda	Katsuyuki Sumisawa	Takeo Ide	May 6, 1992	October 2, 2000 (FUNimation) April 25, 2001 (Ocean)
139	124	"An Ominous Foreboding! Bulma Unveils a Mystery" / "Unwelcome Discovery"; Transliteration: "Fukitsu na Yokan! Buruma ga Shiraseta Misuterī" (Japanese: 不吉な予感！ブルマが知らせたミステリー)	Mitsuo Hashimoto	Katsuyuki Sumisawa	Yukio Ebisawa	May 13, 1992	October 3, 2000 (FUNimation) April 26, 2001 (Ocean)

=== Season 5: Imperfect Cell and Perfect Cell Sagas (1992) ===
No. overall	Initial dub no.	Translated title/Funimation's dub title Original Japanese title	Directed by	Written by	Animation directed by	Original release date	English air date
140	125	"Discovery of an Evil Egg!! A Terrified Trunks" / "Seized with Fear"; Transliteration: "Jaaku no Tamago o Hakken!! Kyōfu suru Torankusu" (Japanese: 邪悪の卵を発見!!恐怖するトランクス)	Yoshihiro Ueda	Katsuyuki Sumisawa	Kazuya Hisada	May 20, 1992	October 4, 2000 (FUNimation) April 27, 2001 (Ocean)
141	126	"To Face an Unprecedented Foe... Birth of a Super Namekian!!" / "The Reunion"; Transliteration: "Katsutenai Teki ni Mukete... Sūpā Namekkuseijin Tanjō!!" (Japanese: かつてない敵に向けて…超ナメック星人誕生!!)	Daisuke Nishio	Katsuyuki Sumisawa	Masayuki Uchiyama	May 27, 1992	October 5, 2000 (FUNimation) April 30, 2001 (Ocean)
142	127	"Kamehame-Ha!? The Monster Who Possesses Goku's Ki" / "Borrowed Powers"; Transliteration: "Kamehameha!? Gokū no Ki o Motsu Monsutā" (Japanese: カメハメ波!?悟空の気を持つモンスター)	Jun'ichi Fujise; Storyboarded by : Daisuke Nishio	Katsuyuki Sumisawa	Minoru Maeda	June 3, 1992	October 6, 2000 (FUNimation) May 1, 2001 (Ocean)
143	128	"A Life Form of Evil and Destruction!! His Name Is Artificial Human Cell" / "His Name is Cell"; Transliteration: "Zōo to Hakai no Seimeitai!! Yatsu no Na wa Jinzō Ningen Seru" (Japanese: 憎悪と破壊の生命体!!奴の名は人造人間セル)	Mitsuo Hashimoto	Katsuyuki Sumisawa	Tadayoshi Yamamuro	June 10, 1992	October 9, 2000 (FUNimation) May 2, 2001 (Ocean)
144	129	"Piccolo's Grievous Mistake! Cell Turned Loose on the City!" / "Piccolo's Folly"; Transliteration: "Pikkoro Tsūkon no Daishippai! Seru ga Machi ni Hanatareta!" (Japanese: ピッコロ痛恨の大失敗！セルが街に放たれた！)	Yoshihiro Ueda	Katsuyuki Sumisawa	Yukio Ebisawa	June 17, 1992	October 10, 2000 (FUNimation) May 3, 2001 (Ocean)
145	130	"The Secret of Cell's Birth! What Lies Below the Laboratory!?" / "Laboratory Basement"; Transliteration: "Seru Tanjō no Himitsu! Kenkyūjo no Chika ni Nani ga Aru!?" (Japanese: セル誕生の秘密！研究所の地下に何がある!?)	Daisuke Nishio	Hiroshi Toda	Masayuki Uchiyama	June 24, 1992	October 11, 2000 (FUNimation) May 4, 2001 (Ocean)
146	131	"Goku Awakens to Battle! Go Beyond Super Saiyan!!" / "Our Hero Awakes"; Transliteration: "Gokū Tatakai e no Mezame! Sūpā Saiyajin o Koero!!" (Japanese: 悟空闘いへの目覚め！超サイヤ人を超えろ!!)	Mitsuo Hashimoto	Aya Matsui	Kazuya Hisada	July 1, 1992	October 12, 2000 (FUNimation) May 8, 2001 (Ocean)
147	132	"Hasten Your Training, Saiyans! In the Room of Spirit and Time..." / "Time Chamber"; Transliteration: "Shugyō o Isoge Saiyajin! Seishin to Toki no Heya de..." (Japanese: 修行を急げサイヤ人！精神と時の部屋で…)	Yamauchi Shigeyasu	Aya Matsui	Tadayoshi Yamamuro	July 8, 1992	October 13, 2000 (FUNimation) May 9, 2001 (Ocean)
148	133	"The Gekiretsu Kodan That Split the Heavens!! Piccolo vs. Artificial Human No. 17" / "The Monster is Coming"; Transliteration: "Ten o Saku Gekiretsu Kōdan!! Pikkoro Tai Jinzō Ningen Jūnanagō" (Japanese: 天を裂く激烈光弾!!ピッコロVS人造人間17号)	Yoshihiro Ueda	Katsuyuki Sumisawa	Yukio Ebisawa	July 15, 1992	October 16, 2000 (FUNimation) May 10, 2001 (Ocean)
149	134	"How I Have Waited for This Day!! Cell's Prologue to Perfection" / "He's Here"; Transliteration: "Kono Hi o Matte Ita!! Seru - Kanzentai eno Jokyoku" (Japanese: この日を待っていた!!セル・完全体への序曲)	Daisuke Nishio	Katsuyuki Sumisawa	Masayuki Uchiyama	July 22, 1992	October 17, 2000 (FUNimation) May 11, 2001 (Ocean)
150	135	"The Suicide Counterattack Proves Ineffective! Piccolo's Flame Burns Out!!" / "Up to Piccolo"; Transliteration: "Sutemi no Hangeki Oyobazu! Pikkoro Moetsukiru!!" (Japanese: 捨て身の反撃及ばず！ピッコロ燃え尽きる!!)	Mitsuo Hashimoto	Aya Matsui	Kazuya Hisada	July 29, 1992	October 18, 2000 (FUNimation) May 14, 2001 (Ocean)
151	136	"One Final Remaining Hope... No. 16, the Wordless Warrior, Takes Action!!" / "Silent Warrior"; Transliteration: "Nokosareta Yuiitsu no Nozomi... Mugon no Senshi Jūrokugō Tatsu!!" (Japanese: 残された唯一の望み…無言の戦士16号立つ!!)	Mitsuo Hashimoto; Storyboarded by : Kazuhito Kikuchi	Aya Matsui	Masayuki Uchiyama	August 5, 1992	October 19, 2000 (FUNimation) May 15, 2001 (Ocean)
152	137	"No. 17 Swallowed... The Transforming Cell is a Super Gourmet" / "Say Goodbye, 17"; Transliteration: "Jūnanagō o Nomikonda... Henshin Seru wa Chōgurume" (Japanese: 17号を飲み込んだ…変身セルは超グルメ)	Yoshihiro Ueda	Aya Matsui	Tadayoshi Yamamuro	August 12, 1992	October 20, 2000 (FUNimation) May 16, 2001 (Ocean)
153	138	"Tomorrow, I Am Going to Pulverize You!! Goku's Challenge" / "Sacrifice"; Transliteration: "Ashita wa Omee o Tatakinomesu!! Gokū no Chōsenjō" (Japanese: 明日はオメエを叩きのめす!!悟空の挑戦状)	Daisuke Nishio	Hiroshi Toda	Yukio Ebisawa	August 19, 1992	October 23, 2000 (FUNimation) May 17, 2001 (Ocean)
154	139	"I Will Dispose of Everything!! A Reborn Vegeta, Father and Son, Sally Forth" / "Saiyans Emerge"; Transliteration: "Subete Ore ga Katazukeru!! Shinsei Bejīta Oyako Shutsugeki" (Japanese: 全てオレが片付ける!!新生ベジータ親子出撃)	Mitsuo Hashimoto	Hiroshi Toda	Minoru Maeda	August 26, 1992	October 24, 2000 (FUNimation) May 18, 2001 (Ocean)
155	140	"Suddenly Full-Throttle!! The Super Power of a Radiant Vegeta" / "Super Vegeta"; Transliteration: "Ikinari Zenkai!! Hikarikagayaku Bejīta no Chōpawā" (Japanese: いきなり全開!!光り輝くベジータの超パワー)	Jun'ichi Fujise	Sumio Uetake	Kazuya Hisada	September 2, 1992	October 25, 2000 (FUNimation) May 21, 2001 (Ocean)
156	141	"On Your Knees, Cell! I Am Super Vegeta!!" / "Bow to the Prince"; Transliteration: "Seru yo Hizamazuke! Ore wa Sūpā Bejīta da!!" (Japanese: セルよひざまずけ！オレは超ベジータだ!!)	Yamauchi Shigeyasu	Sumio Uetake	Masayuki Uchiyama	September 9, 1992	October 26, 2000 (FUNimation) May 22, 2001 (Ocean)
157	142	"Dangerous Pride!! A Challenge to Cell's Perfect Form" / "Hour of Temptation"; Transliteration: "Kiken na Puraido!! Kanzentai Seru eno Chōsen" (Japanese: 危険なプライド!!完全体セルへの挑戦)	Yoshihiro Ueda	Takao Koyama	Tadayoshi Yamamuro	September 16, 1992	October 27, 2000 (FUNimation) May 23, 2001 (Ocean)
158	143	"I'm So Distraught!! Kururin's Handiwork in Destroying No. 18" / "Krillin's Decision"; Transliteration: "Ore Nayanjau!! Kuririn no Jūhachigō Hakai Kōsaku" (Japanese: オレ悩んじゃう!!クリリンの18号破壊工作)	Mitsuo Hashimoto	Takao Koyama	Yukio Ebisawa	September 23, 1992	October 30, 2000 (FUNimation) May 24, 2001 (Ocean)
159	144	"A Shock to the Entire Universe!! Cell's Spectacular Evolution Toward His Perfect Form" / "The Last Defense"; Transliteration: "Zen'uchū ni Shōgeki!! Seru, Kanzentai e Kyōi no Shinka" (Japanese: 全宇宙に衝撃!!セル、完全体へ驚異の進化)	Takahiro Imamura; Storyboarded by : Kazuhito Kikuchi	Katsuyuki Sumisawa	Naoki Miyahara	September 30, 1992	October 31, 2000 (FUNimation) May 25, 2001 (Ocean)
160	145	"Battle Power Infinity!! Birth of the God of Destruction Named Cell" / "Cell is Complete"; Transliteration: "Sentōryoku Mugendai!! Seru to Iu Na no Hakaishin Tanjō" (Japanese: 戦闘力無限大!!セルという名の破壊神誕生)	Yamauchi Shigeyasu	Katsuyuki Sumisawa	Masahiro Shimanuki	October 14, 1992	November 1, 2000 (FUNimation) May 28, 2001 (Ocean)
161	146	"Super Vegeta in Peril!! An Absolutely Perfect Terror Closes In!!" / "Vegeta Must Pay"; Transliteration: "Sūpā Bejīta Ayaushi!! Kanzen Muketsu no Kyōfu ga Semaru!!" (Japanese: 超ベジータ危うし!!完全無欠の恐怖が迫る!!)	Jun'ichi Fujise	Katsuyuki Sumisawa	Masayuki Uchiyama	October 21, 1992	November 2, 2000 (FUNimation) May 29, 2001 (Ocean)
162	147	"Breaking Through the Boundaries of the Super Saiyan!! Trunks Summons a Storm" / "Trunks Ascends"; Transliteration: "Sūpā Saiyajin no Genkai Toppa!! Arashi o Yobu Torankusu" (Japanese: 超サイヤ人の限界突破!!嵐を呼ぶトランクス)	Daisuke Nishio	Aya Matsui	Tadayoshi Yamamuro	October 28, 1992	November 3, 2000 (FUNimation) May 30, 2001 (Ocean)
163	148	"Save Your Father!! Trunks' Fury, Which Scorches Even the Heavens" / "Saving Throw"; Transliteration: "Chichi o Sukue!! Ten o mo Kogasu Torankusu no Ikari" (Japanese: 父を救え!!天をも焦がすトランクスの怒り)	Mitsuo Hashimoto	Aya Matsui	Yukio Ebisawa	November 4, 1992	November 6, 2000 (FUNimation) May 31, 2001 (Ocean)
164	149	"A Future of Despair!! Trunks, the Man Who Lived Through Hell" / "Ghosts from Tomorrow"; Transliteration: "Zetsubō no Mirai!! Jigoku o Ikinuita Otoko Torankusu" (Japanese: 絶望の未来!!地獄を生き抜いた男トランクス)	Kazuhito Kikuchi	Hiroshi Toda	Minoru Maeda	November 11, 1992	November 7, 2000 (FUNimation) June 1, 2001 (Ocean)
165	150	"Super Trunks Has a Weakness!! Cell's Shocking Bombshell Declaration" / "The Cell Games"; Transliteration: "Sūpā Torankusu ni Jakuten!! Seru, Shōgeki no Bakudan Hatsugen" (Japanese: 超トランクスに弱点!!セル、衝撃の爆弾発言)	Masahiro Hosoda	Hiroshi Toda	Masayuki Uchiyama	November 18, 1992	November 8, 2000 (FUNimation) June 1, 2001 (Ocean)

=== Season 6: Cell Games Saga (1992–1993) ===
No. overall	Initial dub no.	Translated title/Funimation's dub title Original Japanese title	Directed by	Written by	Animation directed by	Original release date	English air date
166	151	"A Final Battle Closes In on Goku!! The Mystery of the New Tenkaichi Tournament" / "What is the Tournament?"; Transliteration: "Gokū ni Semaru Daikessen!! Shin-Tenkaichi Budōkai no Nazo" (Japanese: 悟空に迫る大決戦!!新天下一武道会の謎)	Jun'ichi Fujise	Katsuyuki Sumisawa	Masahiro Shimanuki	November 25, 1992	November 9, 2000 (FUNimation) September 3, 2001 (Ocean)
167	152	"100% Ratings!! The Cell Games Call Forth Death with an Exclusive Live Broadcast" / "The Doomsday Broadcast"; Transliteration: "Shichōritsu Hyaku Pāsento!! Shi o Yobu Seru Gēmu Dokusen Namahōsō" (Japanese: 視聴率100%!!死を呼ぶセルゲーム独占生放送)	Yamauchi Shigeyasu	Aya Matsui	Yukio Ebisawa	December 2, 1992	November 13, 2000 (FUNimation) September 4, 2001 (Ocean)
168	153	"Goku and Gohan... The Hero Father and Son's Ultimate Level-Up" / "Meet Me in the Ring"; Transliteration: "Gokū to Gohan... Hīrō Oyako Kyūkyoku Reberu Appu" (Japanese: 悟空と悟飯…ヒーロー親子究極レベルアップ)	Daisuke Nishio	Aya Matsui	Tadayoshi Yamamuro	December 9, 1992	November 14, 2000 (FUNimation) September 5, 2001 (Ocean)
169	154	"Goku's Composure!? Let's Rest and Wait for the Cell Games" / "No Worries Here"; Transliteration: "Gokū no Yoyū!? Yasunde Matō Seru Gēmu" (Japanese: 悟空の余裕!?休んで待とうセルゲーム)	Mitsuo Hashimoto	Katsuyuki Sumisawa	Masayuki Uchiyama	December 16, 1992	November 15, 2000 (FUNimation) September 6, 2001 (Ocean)
170	155	"A Warrior's Rest... The Girl, the Lies, and Gohan's Resolution" / "A Girl Named Lime"; Transliteration: "Senshi no Kyūsoku... Shōjo to Uso to Gohan no Ketsui" (Japanese: 戦士の休息…少女と嘘と悟飯の決意)	Hiroki Shibata	Katsuyuki Sumisawa	Masahiro Shimanuki	January 13, 1993	November 16, 2000 (FUNimation) September 7, 2001 (Ocean)
171	156	"Hidden Power!! When Gohan Was a Baby" / "Memories of Gohan"; Transliteration: "Himerareta Chikara!! Gohan ga Akanbō datta Koro" (Japanese: 秘められた力!!悟飯が赤ン坊だった頃)	Yoshihiro Ueda	Aya Matsui	Yukio Ebisawa	January 20, 1993	November 20, 2000 (FUNimation) September 10, 2001 (Ocean)
172	157	"Seek Out Kami-sama!! Goku's Great Instantaneous Movement" / "A New Guardian"; Transliteration: "Kamisama o Sagashidase!! Goku, Dai Shunkan Idō" (Japanese: 神様を探し出せ!!悟空、大瞬間移動)	Mitsuo Hashimoto	Sumio Uetake	Masayuki Uchiyama	January 27, 1993	November 21, 2000 (FUNimation) September 11, 2001 (Ocean)
173	158	"Dende's First Task!! The Dragon Balls Restored" / "Dende's Dragon"; Transliteration: "Dende no Hatsu Shigoto!! Doragon Bōru Fukkatsu da" (Japanese: デンデの初仕事!!ドラゴンボール復活だ)	Masahiro Hosoda	Hiroshi Toda	Tadayoshi Yamamuro	February 3, 1993	November 22, 2000 (FUNimation) September 12, 2001 (Ocean)
174	159	"A Hard Problem for Goku!? Take Back the Dragon Balls" / "The Puzzle of General Tao"; Transliteration: "Gokū ni Nanmon!? Doragon Bōru o Torimodose" (Japanese: 悟空に難問!?神龍球をとり戻せ)	Daisuke Nishio	Hiroshi Toda	Keisuke Masunaga	February 10, 1993	November 23, 2000 (FUNimation) September 13, 2001 (Ocean)
175	160	"Those Who Would Challenge Cell!! The Curtain Rises on the Battle" / "The Games Begin"; Transliteration: "Seru ni Idomu Mono Tachi!! Kessen no Makuake" (Japanese: セルに挑む者たち!!決戦の幕開け)	Kazuhito Kikuchi	Hiroshi Toda	Masahiro Shimanuki	February 17, 1993	November 27, 2000 (FUNimation) September 14, 2001 (Ocean)
176	161	"Just a Moment!! The Satan Squad Goes On the Rampage" / "Losers Fight First"; Transliteration: "Chotto Matta!! Satangundan Daiabare" (Japanese: ちょっと待った!!サタン軍団大暴れ)	Hiroki Shibata	Sumio Uetake	Yukio Ebisawa	March 3, 1993	November 28, 2000 (FUNimation) September 17, 2001 (Ocean)
177	162	"Fight Time, Goku!! The Ultra-Tense Cell Games" / "Goku vs. Cell"; Transliteration: "Shōbu da Gokū!! Chō Kinpaku Seru Gēmu" (Japanese: 勝負だ悟空!!超緊迫セルゲーム)	Mitsuo Hashimoto	Katsuyuki Sumisawa	Ichirō Hattori	March 10, 1993	November 29, 2000 (FUNimation) September 18, 2001 (Ocean)
178	163	"Direct Hit to Earth!! Cell's Extra-Large Kamehame-Ha" / "Cell's Bag of Tricks"; Transliteration: "Chikyū Chokugeki!! Seru no Tokudai Kamehameha" (Japanese: 地球直撃!!セルの特大カメハメ波)	Yoshihiro Ueda	Katsuyuki Sumisawa	Masayuki Uchiyama	March 17, 1993	November 30, 2000 (FUNimation) September 19, 2001 (Ocean)
179	164	"Defeat or Death!? Goku's Turnabout Ploy" / "No More Rules"; Transliteration: "Haiboku ka Shi ka!? Gokū, Gyakuten no Hisaku" (Japanese: 敗北か死か!?悟空、逆転の秘策)	Daisuke Nishio	Hiroshi Toda	Keisuke Masunaga	March 31, 1993	December 4, 2000 (FUNimation) September 20, 2001 (Ocean)
180	165	"A Conclusion to the Deathmatch!! Goku's Declaration of Surrender!?" / "The Fight is Over"; Transliteration: "Shitō ni Ketchaku!! Gokū no Kōsan Sengen!?" (Japanese: 死闘に決着!!悟空の降参宣言!?)	Atsutoshi Umezawa	Hiroshi Toda	Masahiro Shimanuki	April 7, 1993	December 5, 2000 (FUNimation) September 21, 2001 (Ocean)
181	166	"He Who Takes Over as Strongest... His Name is Gohan" / "Faith in a Boy"; Transliteration: "Saikyō o Tsugu Mono... Sono Na wa Gohan" (Japanese: 最強を継ぐ者…その名は悟飯)	Kazuhito Kikuchi	Hiroshi Toda	Masayuki Uchiyama	April 14, 1993	December 6, 2000 (FUNimation) September 24, 2001 (Ocean)
182	167	"Become Enraged, Gohan — Call Forth Your Dormant Power" / "Gohan's Desperate Plea"; Transliteration: "Ikare Gohan Nemureru Chikara o Yobiokose" (Japanese: 怒れ悟飯眠れる力を呼び起せ)	Masahiro Hosoda	Hiroshi Toda	Yūji Hakamada	April 21, 1993	December 7, 2000 (FUNimation) September 25, 2001 (Ocean)
183	168	"Teeny Menaces!! Attack of the Cell Juniors" / "Android Explosion"; Transliteration: "Chitchana Kyōi!! Seru Junia Raishū" (Japanese: ちっちゃな脅威!!セルジュニア来襲)	Hiroki Shibata	Hiroshi Toda	Yukio Ebisawa	April 28, 1993	December 11, 2000 (FUNimation) September 26, 2001 (Ocean)
184	169	"The Tragic No. 16!! An Enraged Super Gohan Begins Taking Action" / "Cell Juniors Attack!" and "Children of Cell Attack"; Transliteration: "Jūrokugō Muzan!! Ugokidasu Ikari no Sūpā Gohan" (Japanese: 16号無惨!!動き出す怒りの超悟飯)	Mitsuo Hashimoto	Katsuyuki Sumisawa	Keisuke Masunaga	May 5, 1993	December 12, 2000 (FUNimation) September 27, 2001 (Ocean)
185	170	"Devastating True Power!! The Cell Juniors Pulverized" / "The Unleashing" and "Awakening"; Transliteration: "Fukiareru Shin no Pawā!! Seru Junia Funsai" (Japanese: 吹き荒れる真の力!!セルジュニア粉砕)	Yoshihiro Ueda	Katsuyuki Sumisawa	Tadayoshi Yamamuro	May 12, 1993	December 13, 2000 (FUNimation) September 28, 2001 (Ocean)
186	171	"Cell Gets KO'ed!! Just Two Super Ironfisted Blows" / "The Unstoppable Gohan"; Transliteration: "Seru o Nokkuauto!! Tatta Nihatsu no Chō Tekken" (Japanese: セルをKO（ノックアウト）!!たった2発の超鉄拳)	Daisuke Nishio	Katsuyuki Sumisawa	Masayuki Uchiyama	May 19, 1993	December 14, 2000 (FUNimation) October 1, 2001 (Ocean)
187	172	"Something Amiss With Cell!! His Perfect Form Crumbles" / "Cell's Mighty Breakdown"; Transliteration: "Seru ni Ihen!! Kuzusareta Kanzentai" (Japanese: セルに異変!!崩された完全体)	Kazuhito Kikuchi	Katsuyuki Sumisawa	Masahiro Shimanuki	May 26, 1993	December 18, 2000 (FUNimation) October 2, 2001 (Ocean)
188	173	"Bye-Bye, Everyone!! Goku's Last Instantaneous Movement" / "A Hero's Farewell"; Transliteration: "Bai Bai Minna!! Gokū Saigo no Shunkan Idō" (Japanese: バイバイみんな!!悟空最後の瞬間移動)	Masahiro Hosoda	Hiroshi Toda	Yūji Hakamada	June 2, 1993	December 19, 2000 (FUNimation) October 3, 2001 (Ocean)
189	174	"A Nightmare in Broad Daylight!! The Terror Becomes Even More Perfect" / "Cell Returns!"; Transliteration: "Hakuchū no Akuma!! Kyōfu wa yori Kanpeki ni" (Japanese: 白昼の悪夢!!恐怖はより完璧に)	Hiroki Shibata	Aya Matsui	Yukio Ebisawa	June 16, 1993	December 20, 2000 (FUNimation) October 4, 2001 (Ocean)
190	175	"From Goku to Gohan... The Spirit of the Father is Handed Down" / "The Horror Won't End"; Transliteration: "Gokū kara Gohan e... Chichi no Tamashii wa Tsutawatta" (Japanese: 悟空から悟飯へ…父の魂は伝わった)	Yamauchi Shigeyasu	Hiroshi Toda	Masayuki Uchiyama	June 23, 1993	December 21, 2000 (FUNimation) October 5, 2001 (Ocean)
191	176	"The Battle is Over... Thank You, Son Goku" / "Save the World"; Transliteration: "Tatakai wa Owatta... Arigatō Son Gokū" (Japanese: 戦いは終った…ありがとう孫悟空)	Kazuhito Kikuchi	Katsuyuki Sumisawa	Keisuke Masunaga	June 30, 1993	December 26, 2000 (FUNimation) October 8, 2001 (Ocean)
192	177	"I'm Going to Train In the Next World!! A Smile at Parting" / "Goku's Decision"; Transliteration: "Ora Ano Yo de Shugyō suru!! Egao no Wakare" (Japanese: オラあの世で修業する!!笑顔の別れ)	Daisuke Nishio	Katsuyuki Sumisawa	Yūji Hakamada	July 7, 1993	December 27, 2000 (FUNimation) October 9, 2001 (Ocean)
193	178	"New Days... Father! I'm Hanging In There" / "One More Wish"; Transliteration: "Atarashii Hibi... Tōsan! Boku Ganbaru" (Japanese: 新しい日々…父さん！ボクがんばる)	Masahiro Hosoda	Takao Koyama	Yukio Ebisawa	July 14, 1993	December 28, 2000 (FUNimation) October 10, 2001 (Ocean)
194	179	"One More Conclusion!! I Will Defend the Future" / "Free the Future"; Transliteration: "Mō Hitotsu no Ketsumatsu!! Mirai wa Ore ga Mamoru" (Japanese: もう一つの結末!!未来はオレが守る)	Hiroki Shibata	Hiroshi Toda	Masayuki Uchiyama	July 21, 1993	December 29, 2000 (FUNimation) October 11, 2001 (Ocean)

=== Season 7: Other World, Great Saiyaman and World Tournament Sagas (1993–1994) ===
No. overall	Initial dub no.	Translated title/Funimation's dub title Original Japanese title	Directed by	Written by	Animation directed by	Original release date	English air date
195	180	"A Deep Impression!! There They Are! The Next World's Awesome Dudes" / "Warriors of the Dead"; Transliteration: "Daikangeki!! Ita zo! Ano Yo no Sugee Yatsu" (Japanese: 大感激!!いたぞ！あの世のスゲエ奴)	Mitsuo Hashimoto	Aya Matsui	Keisuke Masunaga	July 28, 1993	September 10, 2001 (FUNimation) October 12, 2001 (Ocean)
196	181	"I'm the Best in the Next World!! Heroes of the Ages Assembled" / "Tournament Begins"; Transliteration: "Ano Yo Ichi wa Ora da! Rekishi no Yūsha Daishūgō" (Japanese: あの世一はオラだ!!歴代の勇者大集合)	Kazuhito Kikuchi	Aya Matsui	Yūji Hakamada	August 11, 1993	September 11, 2001 (FUNimation) October 15, 2001 (Ocean)
197	182	"Grand Kaio's World Gone Wild!! Goku Kicks Up a Whirlwind" / "Water Fight"; Transliteration: "Daikaiōsei Nekkyō!! Makiokose Gokū Senpū" (Japanese: 大界王星熱狂!!まきおこせ悟空旋風)	Daisuke Nishio	Aya Matsui	Masayuki Uchiyama	August 18, 1993	September 11, 2001 (FUNimation) October 16, 2001 (Ocean)
198	183	"Final Round of Flame!! Goku or Paikuhan!?" / "Final Round"; Transliteration: "Honoo no Kesshō!! Gokū ka Paikūhan ka!?" (Japanese: 炎の決勝!!悟空かパイクーハンか!?)	Osamu Kasai	Aya Matsui	Yukio Ebisawa	August 25, 1993	September 13, 2001 (FUNimation) October 17, 2001 (Ocean)
199	184	"Don't Let Victory Get Away!! Finish With an Ultra-Fast Kamehame-Ha" / "Goku vs. Pikkon"; Transliteration: "Nigasu na Shōri!! Kimero Chōhaya Kamehameha" (Japanese: 逃すな勝利!!決めろ超速かめはめ波)	Hiroki Shibata	Aya Matsui	Naoki Miyahara	September 1, 1993	September 14, 2001 (FUNimation) October 18, 2001 (Ocean)
200	185	"Seven Years Since Then! Starting Today, I'm a High School Student" / "Gohan Goes to High School"; Transliteration: "Are kara Shichinen! Kyō kara Boku wa Kōkōsei" (Japanese: あれから7年！今日から僕は高校生)	Mitsuo Hashimoto	Takao Koyama	Tadayoshi Yamamuro	September 8, 1993	September 17, 2001 (FUNimation) October 19, 2001 (Ocean)
201	186	"For Love and Justice — Enter the Great Saiyaman" / "I am Saiyaman"; Transliteration: "Ai to Seigi no Gurēto Saiyaman Sanjō" (Japanese: 愛と正義のグレートサイヤマン参上)	Kazuhito Kikuchi	Hiroshi Toda	Keisuke Masunaga	September 15, 1993	September 18, 2001 (FUNimation) October 22, 2001 (Ocean)
202	187	"Gohan's Frantic First Date!?" / "Gohan's First Date"; Transliteration: "Gohan no Hachamecha Hatsu Dēto!?" (Japanese: 悟飯のハチャメチャ初デート!?)	Daisuke Nishio	Satoru Akahori	Yūji Hakamada	September 29, 1993	November 27, 2001 (FUNimation) October 23, 2001 (Ocean)
203	188	"Gohan, Scramble! Save Videl!!" / "Rescue Videl"; Transliteration: "Gohan, Kinkyū Shutsudō! Bīderu o Sukue!" (Japanese: 悟飯、緊急出動！ビーデルを救え!!)	Mitsuo Hashimoto	Yoshiyuki Suga	Masayuki Uchiyama	October 20, 1993	September 19, 2001 (FUNimation) October 24, 2001 (Ocean)
204	189	"A Case of Robbery!! The Culprit is Saiyaman!?" / "Blackmail"; Transliteration: "Tōnan Jiken Hassei!! Hannin wa Saiyaman!?" (Japanese: 盗難事件発生!!犯人はサイヤマン!?)	Takahiro Imamura	Yoshiyuki Suga	Yukio Ebisawa	October 27, 1993	September 20, 2001 (FUNimation) October 25, 2001 (Ocean)
205	190	"Goku Returning to Life!? Entry into the Tenkaichi Tournament!!" / "I'll Fight Too!"; Transliteration: "Gokū mo Fukkatsu!? Tenkaichi Budōkai Shutsujō da!!" (Japanese: 悟空も復活!?天下一武道会出場だ!!)	Yoshihiro Ueda	Aya Matsui	Masahiro Shimanuki	November 3, 1993	September 21, 2001 (FUNimation) October 26, 2001 (Ocean)
206	191	"Even Gohan is Surprised! Goten's Explosion of Power" / "The Newest Super Saiyan"; Transliteration: "Gohan mo Bikkuri! Goten no Bakuhatsu Pawā" (Japanese: 悟飯もビックリ！悟天の爆発パワー)	Osamu Kasai	Aya Matsui	Tadayoshi Yamamuro	November 10, 1993	September 24, 2001 (FUNimation) October 29, 2001 (Ocean)
207	192	"Ah, You're Flying!! Videl's Introduction to Bukujutsu" / "Take Flight Videl"; Transliteration: "Attobeta!! Bīderu no Bukūjutsu Nyūmon" (Japanese: あっ飛べた!!ビーデルの舞空術入門)	Yamauchi Shigeyasu	Hiroshi Toda	Keisuke Masunaga	November 17, 1993	September 25, 2001 (FUNimation) October 30, 2001 (Ocean)
208	193	"Welcome Back, Goku! The Entire Z Team Assembles!!" / "Gather For the Tournament"; Transliteration: "Okaeri Gokū! Zetto Chīmu Zen'in Shūgō!!" (Japanese: おかえり悟空！Zチーム全員集合!!)	Kazuhito Kikuchi	Hiroshi Toda	Masayuki Uchiyama	November 24, 1993	September 26, 2001 (FUNimation) October 31, 2001 (Ocean)
209	194	"Watch Out, Saiyaman! Beware of Sharpshooters!?" / "Camera Shy"; Transliteration: "Ayaushi Saiyaman! Gekisha ni Goyōjin!?" (Japanese: 危うしサイヤマン！激写に御用心!?)	Yoshihiro Ueda	Takao Koyama	Yūji Hakamada	December 8, 1993	September 27, 2001 (FUNimation) November 1, 2001 (Ocean)
210	195	"No Small Matter!! Little Trunks" / "The World Tournament"; Transliteration: "Hanpa ja nai ze!! Chibi Torankusu" (Japanese: ハンパじゃないぜ!!チビトランクス)	Mitsuo Hashimoto	Sumio Uetake	Yukio Ebisawa	December 15, 1993	September 28, 2001 (FUNimation) November 2, 2001 (Ocean)
211	196	"It's My Turn! Goten's Anxious First Fight" / "Trunks vs. Goten"; Transliteration: "Boku no Deban da! Goten, Kinchō no Daiissen" (Japanese: ボクの出番だ！悟天、緊張の第一戦)	Takahiro Imamura	Hiroshi Toda	Masahiro Shimanuki	December 22, 1993	October 1, 2001 (FUNimation) November 5, 2001 (Ocean)
212	197	"Happiness Times a Million! The Junior Champion Is Decided!!" / "Best of the Boys"; Transliteration: "Ureshisa Hyakumanbai! Shōnen Chanpion Kettei!!" (Japanese: うれしさ百万倍！少年王者（チャンピオン）決定!!)	Yamauchi Shigeyasu	Hiroshi Toda	Masayuki Uchiyama	January 12, 1994	October 2, 2001 (FUNimation) November 6, 2001 (Ocean)
213	198	"Now What, Satan!? The Greatest Pinch in History" / "Big Trouble, Little Trunks"; Transliteration: "Dō suru Satan!? Shijō Saidai no Pinchi" (Japanese: どうするサタン!?史上最大のピンチ)	Kazuhito Kikuchi	Hiroshi Toda	Tadayoshi Yamamuro	January 19, 1994	October 3, 2001 (FUNimation) November 7, 2001 (Ocean)
214	199	"Event Match-ups Decided!! Let's Hurry and Hold the First Round" / "Who Will Fight Who?"; Transliteration: "Taisen Aite Kettei!! Hayaku Yarō ze Ikkaisen" (Japanese: 対戦相手決定!!早くやろうぜ一回戦)	Yoshihiro Ueda	Hiroshi Toda	Keisuke Masunaga	January 26, 1994	October 4, 2001 (FUNimation) November 8, 2001 (Ocean)
215	200	"What's the Matter, Piccolo!? An Unheard-of No-Fight-Forfeit" / "Forfeit of Piccolo!"; Transliteration: "Dōshita Pikkoro!! Masaka no Fusenbai" (Japanese: どうしたピッコロ!!まさかの不戦敗)	Osamu Kasai	Sumio Uetake	Yūji Hakamada	February 2, 1994	October 5, 2001 (FUNimation) November 9, 2001 (Ocean)
216	201	"Undyingly Unpleasant!? The Mystery of Spopovitch" / "A Dark and Secret Power"; Transliteration: "Fujimi de Bukimi!? Supopobitchi no Nazo" (Japanese: 不死身で不気味!?スポポビッチの謎)	Mitsuo Hashimoto	Katsuyuki Sumisawa	Shingo Ishikawa	February 9, 1994	October 8, 2001 (FUNimation) November 12, 2001 (Ocean)
217	202	"A Tragic Videl!! Are You Coming Out, Angry Super Gohan?" / "Videl is Crushed"; Transliteration: "Bīderu Muzan!! Deru ka Ikari no Sūpā Gohan" (Japanese: ビーデル無残!!出るか怒りの超悟飯)	Kazuhito Kikuchi	Katsuyuki Sumisawa	Yukio Ebisawa	February 16, 1994	October 9, 2001 (FUNimation) November 13, 2001 (Ocean)
218	203	"Exposed!! The Saiyaman is Son Gohan!" / "Identities Revealed"; Transliteration: "Barechatta!! Saiyaman wa Son Gohan" (Japanese: バレちゃった!!サイヤマンは孫悟飯)	Yoshihiro Ueda	Takao Koyama	Masayuki Uchiyama	February 23, 1994	October 10, 2001 (FUNimation) November 14, 2001 (Ocean)
219	204	"A Slithering Conspiracy!! Gohan's Power is Stolen" / "Energy Drain"; Transliteration: "Ugomeku Inbō!! Gohan no Pawā ga Ubawareta" (Japanese: うごめく陰謀!!悟飯の力（パワー）が奪われた)	Takahiro Imamura	Takao Koyama	Masahiro Shimanuki	March 2, 1994	October 11, 2001 (FUNimation) November 15, 2001 (Ocean)

=== Season 8: Babidi and Majin Buu Sagas (1994–1995) ===
No. overall	Initial dub no.	Translated title/Funimation's dub title Original Japanese title	Directed by	Written by	Animation directed by	Original release date	English air date
220	205	"The Man Behind the Curtains Appears!! The Evil Madoshi Babidi" / "The Wizard's Curse"; Transliteration: "Kuromaku Tōjō!! Aku no Madōshi Babidi" (Japanese: 黒幕登場!!悪の魔導師バビディ)	Yoshihiro Ueda	Hiroshi Toda	Keisuke Masunaga	March 9, 1994	October 12, 2001 (FUNimation) February 25, 2002 (Ocean)
221	206	"The Awaiting Trap!! A Challenge from the Demon Realm" / "King of the Demons"; Transliteration: "Machiukeru Wana!! Makai kara no Chōsenjō" (Japanese: 待ち受けるワナ!!魔界からの挑戦状)	Kazuhito Kikuchi	Hiroshi Toda	Yūji Hakamada	March 16, 1994	October 15, 2001 (FUNimation) February 25, 2002 (Ocean)
222	207	"Don't Toy With Me!! Vegeta's Breakthrough First Strike of Fury" / "Vegeta Attacks"; Transliteration: "Nameru na!! Bejīta Ikari no Shosen Toppa" (Japanese: なめるな!!ベジータ怒りの初戦突破)	Mitsuo Hashimoto	Hiroshi Toda	Shingo Ishikawa	March 23, 1994	October 16, 2001 (FUNimation) February 26, 2002 (Ocean)
223	208	"Goku's Power Wide Open!! Blow Away Yakon" / "Next Up, Goku"; Transliteration: "Gokū Pawā Zenkai!! Buttobe Yakon" (Japanese: 悟空パワー全開!!ブッ飛べヤコン)	Yoshihiro Ueda	Hiroshi Toda	Masayuki Uchiyama	April 13, 1994	October 17, 2001 (FUNimation) February 27, 2002 (Ocean)
224	209	"A Great Miscalculation!! Satan vs. Three Super-Warriors!?" / "Battle Supreme"; Transliteration: "Daigosan!! Satan tai Sannin no Chōsenshi!?" (Japanese: 大誤算!!サタンVS3人の超戦士!?)	Osamu Kasai	Hiroshi Toda	Yukio Ebisawa	April 20, 1994	October 18, 2001 (FUNimation) February 28, 2002 (Ocean)
225	210	"Such Strong Kids!! No. 18's Close Fight!?" / "Eighteen Unmasks"; Transliteration: "Tsuyoi ze Chibikko!! Jūhachigō Daikusen!?" (Japanese: 強いぜチビッコ!!18号大苦戦!?)	Kazuhito Kikuchi	Hiroshi Toda	Masahiro Shimanuki	April 27, 1994	October 22, 2001 (FUNimation) April 16, 2002 (Ocean)
226	211	"Confrontation with the Demon King! It's Your Turn, Gohan!!" / "Pay to Win"; Transliteration: "Tachihadakaru Maō! Deban da Gohan!!" (Japanese: たちはだかる魔王！出番だ悟飯!!)	Mitsuo Hashimoto	Masashi Kubota	Keisuke Masunaga	May 4, 1994	October 23, 2001 (FUNimation) April 17, 2002 (Ocean)
227	212	"A Wicked Heart Discovered!! Dabura's Great Idea" / "Heart of a Villain"; Transliteration: "Mitsukerareta Jashin!! Dābura no Meian" (Japanese: 見つけられた邪心!!ダーブラの名案)	Yoshihiro Ueda	Masashi Kubota	Yūji Hakamada	May 18, 1994	October 24, 2001 (FUNimation) April 18, 2002 (Ocean)
228	213	"Vegeta, Prince of Destruction, Revived!! Intrusion at the Tournament" / "The Dark Prince Returns"; Transliteration: "Hakai Ōji Bejīta Fukkatsu!! Butōkai Rannyū" (Japanese: 破壊王子ベジータ復活!!武闘会乱入)	Kazuhito Kikuchi	Masashi Kubota	Masayuki Uchiyama	May 25, 1994	October 25, 2001 (FUNimation) April 19, 2002 (Ocean)
229	214	"The Super-confrontation of Destiny!! The Clash of Goku vs. Vegeta" / "Vegeta's Pride"; Transliteration: "Shukumei no Chōtaiketsu!! Gekitotsu Gokū tai Bejīta" (Japanese: 宿命の超対決!!激突悟空VSベジータ)	Mitsuo Hashimoto	Sumio Uetake	Shingo Ishikawa	June 15, 1994	October 29, 2001 (FUNimation) April 22, 2002 (Ocean)
230	215	"Just You Wait, Babidi!! Your Aspirations Will Not Be Allowed" / "The Long Awaited Fight"; Transliteration: "Mattero Babidi!! Yabō wa Yurusanai" (Japanese: 待ってろバビディ!!野望は許さない)	Kazuhito Kikuchi	Sumio Uetake	Yukio Ebisawa	June 22, 1994	October 30, 2001 (FUNimation) April 23, 2002 (Ocean)
231	216	"The Seal is Broken! Out Comes the Vicious Majin Boo!!" / "Magic Ball of Buu"; Transliteration: "Toketa Fūin! Deruzo Kyōaku Majin Bū!!" (Japanese: 解けた封印！出るぞ凶悪魔人ブウ!!)	Osamu Kasai	Hiroshi Toda	Kazuya Hisada	June 29, 1994	November 1, 2001 (FUNimation) April 24, 2002 (Ocean)
232	217	"I Won't Allow the Revival!! A Kamehame-Ha of Resistance" / "Buu is Hatched!" and "Majin Buu Appears"; Transliteration: "Fukkatsu Sasenai!! Teikō no Kamehameha" (Japanese: 復活させない!!抵抗のかめはめ波)	Yamauchi Shigeyasu	Hiroshi Toda	Tadayoshi Yamamuro	July 6, 1994	November 5, 2001 (FUNimation) April 25, 2002 (Ocean)
233	218	"A Straight Line to Despair!? The Grief of Kaioshin" / "The Losses Begin"; Transliteration: "Zetsubō e Itchokusen!? Nageki no Kaiōshin" (Japanese: 絶望へ一直線!?嘆きの界王神)	Mitsuo Hashimoto	Toshinobu Ooi	Masayuki Uchiyama	July 13, 1994	November 6, 2001 (FUNimation) April 26, 2002 (Ocean)
234	219	"The Terrifying Majin!! Death's Dread Draws Near Gohan" / "The Terror of Majin Buu"; Transliteration: "Majin Osorubeshi!! Gohan ni Semaru Shi no Kyōfu" (Japanese: 魔人恐るべし!!悟飯に迫る死の恐怖)	Kazuhito Kikuchi	Masashi Kubota	Keisuke Masunaga	July 27, 1994	November 7, 2001 (FUNimation) April 29, 2002 (Ocean)
235	220	"'Gonna Eat'cha!!' The Hungry Majin's Supernatural Powers" / "Meal Time"; Transliteration: "Tabechau zo!! Harapeko Majin no Chōnōryoku" (Japanese: 食べちゃうぞ!!腹ペコ魔人の超能力)	Jun'ichi Fujise	Masashi Kubota	Yūji Hakamada	August 3, 1994	November 8, 2001 (FUNimation) April 30, 2002 (Ocean)
236	221	"A Warrior's Resolution!! I Will Dispose of the Majin" / "The Warrior's Decision"; Transliteration: "Senshi no Ketsui!! Majin wa Ore ga Shimatsu-suru" (Japanese: 戦士の決意!!魔人はオレが始末する)	Yamauchi Shigeyasu	Masashi Kubota	Shingo Ishikawa	August 17, 1994	November 12, 2001 (FUNimation) May 1, 2002 (Ocean)
237	222	"For Those Whom He Loves... Vegeta Perishes!!" / "Final Atonement"; Transliteration: "Ai suru Mono no Tame ni... Bejīta Chiru!!" (Japanese: 愛する者のために...ベジータ散る!!)	Mitsuo Hashimoto	Takao Koyama	Yukio Ebisawa	August 24, 1994	November 13, 2001 (FUNimation) May 2, 2002 (Ocean)
238	223	"The Nightmare Revisited!! Majin Boo Has Survived" / "Evil Lives On"; Transliteration: "Akumu Futatabi! Ikiteita Majin Bū" (Japanese: 悪夢ふたたび!!生きていた魔人ブウ)	Kazuhito Kikuchi	Takao Koyama	Masayuki Uchiyama	August 31, 1994	May 3, 2002 (Ocean) September 16, 2002 (FUNimation)
239	224	"The Struggle of Videl and the Others! Find the Dragon Balls" / "Find the Dragon Balls"; Transliteration: "Bīderutachi no Funtō! Sagase Doragon Bōru" (Japanese: ビーデルたちの奮闘！探せ神龍球（ドラゴンボール）)	Yamauchi Shigeyasu	Takao Koyama	Keisuke Masunaga	September 7, 1994	May 6, 2002 (Ocean) September 17, 2002 (FUNimation)
240	225	"Enormous Hope!! A New Finishing Technique for the Little Squirts" / "Revival"; Transliteration: "Dekkai Kibō!! Chibitachi no Shin Hissatsu Waza" (Japanese: でっかい希望!!チビたちの新必殺技)	Hiroki Shibata	Takao Koyama	Yūji Hakamada	September 21, 1994	May 7, 2002 (Ocean) September 18, 2002 (FUNimation)
241	226	"Goten and Trunks — The World's Most Wanted" / "Global Announcement"; Transliteration: "Goten Torankusu Zensekai ni Shimei Tehai" (Japanese: 悟天トランクス全世界に指名手配)	Mitsuo Hashimoto	Takao Koyama	Shingo Ishikawa	September 28, 1994	May 8, 2002 (Ocean) September 19, 2002 (FUNimation)
242	227	"Gohan Revived — Kaioshin's Secret Weapon!?" / "Learn to Fuse"; Transliteration: "Gohan Fukkatsu!! Kaiōshin no Himitsu Heiki!?" (Japanese: 悟飯復活界王神の秘密兵器!?)	Kazuhito Kikuchi	Takao Koyama	Tadayoshi Yamamuro	October 12, 1994	May 9, 2002 (Ocean) September 23, 2002 (FUNimation)
243	228	"It Came Ou~t!! The Legendary Z-Sword" / "The Z Sword"; Transliteration: "Nuketā〜!! Densetsu no Zetto Sōdo" (Japanese: 抜けたァ～!!伝説のゼットソード)	Yamauchi Shigeyasu	Masashi Kubota	Masayuki Uchiyama	October 19, 1994	May 10, 2002 (Ocean) September 24, 2002 (FUNimation)
244	229	"Metro West is Targeted! Stop, Majin Boo!!" / "Race to Capsule Corp."; Transliteration: "Nerawareta Nishi no Miyako! Tomare Majin Bū!!" (Japanese: 狙われた西の都！止まれ魔人ブウ!!)	Jun'ichi Fujise	Reiko Yoshida	Yukio Ebisawa	November 2, 1994	May 13, 2002 (Ocean) September 25, 2002 (FUNimation)
245	230	"An Astounding Great Transformation!! Super Saiyan 3" / "Super Saiyan 3?!"; Transliteration: "Atto Odoroku Daihenshin!! Sūpā Saiyajin Surī" (Japanese: アッと驚く大変身!!超サイヤ人3)	Mitsuo Hashimoto	Hiroshi Toda	Ichio Hayashi	November 9, 1994	May 14, 2002 (Ocean) September 26, 2002 (FUNimation)
246	231	"Bye Bye Babidi!! Majin Boo Rebels" / "Buu's Mutiny"; Transliteration: "Bai Bai Babidi!! Majin Bū Hangyaku" (Japanese: バイバイ・バビディ!!魔人ブウ反逆)	Kazuhito Kikuchi	Hiroshi Toda	Shingo Ishikawa	November 16, 1994	May 15, 2002 (Ocean) September 30, 2002 (FUNimation)
247	232	"Absurdly Awful-Looking!? The Special Training Transformation Pose" / "The Fusion Dance"; Transliteration: "Mecha Kakko Warui!? Tokkun Henshin Pōzu" (Japanese: メチャカッコ悪い!?特訓変身ポーズ)	Yamauchi Shigeyasu	Hiroshi Toda	Keisuke Masunaga	November 23, 1994	May 16, 2002 (Ocean) October 1, 2002 (FUNimation)
248	233	"See You Later, Everybody!! Goku Returns to the Other World" / "Goku's Time is Up"; Transliteration: "Jā na Minna!! Gokū Ano Yo ni Kaeru" (Japanese: じゃあなみんな!!悟空あの世に帰る)	Mitsuo Hashimoto	Hiroshi Toda	Masayuki Uchiyama	November 30, 1994	May 17, 2002 (Ocean) October 2, 2002 (FUNimation)
249	234	"Where is Gohan!? Ferocious Training in the Kaioshin Realm" / "Return to Other World"; Transliteration: "Gohan wa Doko da!? Kaiōshinkai no Mōtokkun" (Japanese: 悟飯はどこだ!?界王神界の猛特訓)	Yoshihiro Ueda	Masashi Kubota	Tadayoshi Yamamuro	December 7, 1994	May 20, 2002 (Ocean) October 3, 2002 (FUNimation)
250	235	"You're Kidding, Right!? The Z-Sword is Broken" / "Out From the Broken Sword"; Transliteration: "Uso daro!? Zetto Sōdo ga Orechatta" (Japanese: ウソだろ!?ゼットソードが折れちゃった)	Kazuhito Kikuchi	Masashi Kubota	Yukio Ebisawa	December 14, 1994	May 21, 2002 (Ocean) October 7, 2002 (FUNimation)
251	236	"Birth of a Superhuman Warrior!! His Name is Gotenks" / "Gotenks is Born"; Transliteration: "Gattai Chōjin Tanjō!! Sono Na wa Gotenkusu" (Japanese: 合体超人誕生!!その名はゴテンクス)	Takahiro Imamura	Masashi Kubota	Shingo Ishikawa	December 21, 1994	May 22, 2002 (Ocean) October 8, 2002 (FUNimation)
252	237	"The Final Weapon is Engaged!? Satan Will Save the Earth" / "Unlikely Friendship"; Transliteration: "Saishū Heiki Shidō!? Satan wa Chikyū o Sukuu" (Japanese: 最終兵器始動!?サタンは地球を救う)	Yamauchi Shigeyasu	Masashi Kubota	Naoaki Hōjō	January 11, 1995	May 23, 2002 (Ocean) October 9, 2002 (FUNimation)
253	238	"I've Stopped Killing!! Majin Boo's Good Boy Declaration" / "I Kill No More"; Transliteration: "Korosu no Yameta!! Majin Bū Yoi Ko Sengen" (Japanese: 殺すのやめた!!魔人ブウよい子宣言)	Mitsuo Hashimoto	Sumio Uetake	Keisuke Masunaga	January 25, 1995	May 24, 2002 (Ocean) October 10, 2002 (FUNimation)

=== Season 9: Fusion, Kid Buu and Peaceful World Sagas (1995–1996) ===
No. overall	Initial dub no.	Translated title/Funimation's dub title Original Japanese title	Directed by	Written by	Animation directed by	Original release date	English air date
254	239	"Run Away, Satan!! An Angry Majin Boo Emerges" / "The Evil of Men"; Transliteration: "Nigero Satan!! Ikari no Majin Bū Shutsugen" (Japanese: 逃げろサタン!!怒りの魔人ブウ出現)	Yoshihiro Ueda	Takao Koyama	Masayuki Uchiyama	February 1, 1995	October 14, 2002 (FUNimation) October 15, 2002 (Ocean)
255	240	"Which One Will Win!? A Good-and-Evil Boo-Boo Confrontation" / "Buu Against Buu"; Transliteration: "Dotchi ga Katsu no!? Zen'aku Bū Bū Taiketsu" (Japanese: どっちが勝つの!?善悪ブウブウ対決)	Kazuhito Kikuchi	Hiroshi Toda	Tadayoshi Yamamuro	February 8, 1995	October 15, 2002 (FUNimation) October 16, 2002 (Ocean)
256	241	"A No-Timeout Catastrophe!! Earth's Humanity Exterminated" / "Empty Planet"; Transliteration: "Matta nashi no Hakyoku!! Chikyū Jinrui Zetsumetsu" (Japanese: 待ったなしの破局!!地球人類絶滅)	Yamauchi Shigeyasu	Hiroshi Toda	Yukio Ebisawa	February 15, 1995	October 16, 2002 (FUNimation) October 17, 2002 (Ocean)
257	242	"The Special Training Is a Success!! You're Finished Now, Majin Boo" / "Time Struggle"; Transliteration: "Tokkun Seikō!! Kore de Owari da Majin Bū" (Japanese: 特訓成功!!これで終りだ魔人ブウ)	Jun'ichi Fujise	Atsushi Maekawa	Shingo Ishikawa	February 22, 1995	October 17, 2002 (FUNimation) October 18, 2002 (Ocean)
258	243	"I'm Going Like I Mean It!! A Wide-Open Super Gotenks" / "Super Moves of Gotenks"; Transliteration: "Honki de Iku ze!! Sūpā Gotenkusu Zenkai" (Japanese: 本気で行くぜ!!超ゴテンクス全開)	Takahiro Imamura	Atsushi Maekawa	Yūji Hakamada	March 1, 1995	October 21, 2002 (FUNimation and Ocean)
259	244	"I've Done It!! Boo Successfully Eliminated With Ghosts!?" / "Trapped in Forever"; Transliteration: "Yatta ze!! Obake de Seikō Bū Taiji!?" (Japanese: やったぜ!!オバケで成功ブウ退治!?)	Mitsuo Hashimoto	Reiko Yoshida	Masayuki Uchiyama	March 8, 1995	October 22, 2002 (FUNimation and Ocean)
260	245	"Escape From Another Dimension!! Super Gotenks 3" / "Feeding Frenzy"; Transliteration: "Ijigen kara no Dasshutsu!! Sūpā Gotenkusu Surī" (Japanese: 異次元からの脱出!!超ゴテンクス3)	Yoshihiro Ueda	Hiroshi Toda	Keisuke Masunaga	March 15, 1995	October 23, 2002 (FUNimation and Ocean)
261	246	"Going Too Far!? Boo-Boo Volleyball" / "Gotenks is Awesome"; Transliteration: "Norisugi!? Bū Bū Barēbōru" (Japanese: ノリすぎ!?ブウブウバレーボール)	Kazuhito Kikuchi	Hiroshi Toda	Naoaki Hōjō	March 22, 1995	October 24, 2002 (FUNimation and Ocean)
262	247	"Truly 'Great'!! A Reborn Gohan Returns to Earth" / "Unlucky Break"; Transliteration: "Masa ni Gurēto!! Shinsei Gohan Chikyū e" (Japanese: まさにグレート!!新生悟飯地球へ)	Mitsuo Hashimoto	Hiroshi Toda	Yukio Ebisawa	April 26, 1995	October 25, 2002 (Ocean) October 28, 2002 (FUNimation)
263	248	"Boo Overwhelmed!! Gohan's Miracle Power" / "A Whole New Gohan"; Transliteration: "Bū o Attō!! Gohan no Mirakuru Pawā" (Japanese: ブウを圧倒!!悟飯のミラクルパワー)	Yoshihiro Ueda	Masashi Kubota	Shingo Ishikawa	May 3, 1995	October 28, 2002 (Ocean) October 29, 2002 (FUNimation)
264	249	"Has He Done It!? Majin Boo's Great Explosion" / "Search for Survivors"; Transliteration: "Yatta ka!? Majin Bū Daibakuhatsu" (Japanese: やったか!?魔人ブウ大爆発)	Kazuhito Kikuchi	Atsushi Maekawa	Yūji Hakamada	May 17, 1995	October 29, 2002 (Ocean) October 30, 2002 (FUNimation)
265	250	"Boo's Worst Foul! Gotenks is Absorbed!?" / "Majin Buu Transforms"; Transliteration: "Bū Saiaku no Hansoku!! Gotenkusu Kyūshū!?" (Japanese: ブウ最悪の反則!!ゴテンクス吸収!?)	Hidehiko Kadota; Storyboarded by : Yoshihiro Ueda	Atsushi Maekawa	Masayuki Uchiyama	May 24, 1995	October 30, 2002 (Ocean) November 4, 2002 (FUNimation)
266	251	"For the Sake of the Entire Universe... Return to Life, Son Goku" / "The Old Kai's Weapon"; Transliteration: "Zen'uchū no Tame ni... Yomigaere Son Gokū" (Japanese: 全宇宙のために…よみがえれ孫悟空)	Mitsuo Hashimoto	Sumio Uetake	Keisuke Masunaga	May 31, 1995	October 31, 2002 (Ocean) November 5, 2002 (FUNimation)
267	252	"The Miracle Happens Once... Will the Super Combination With Gohan Come About?" / "Ready to Fuse?"; Transliteration: "Kiseki wa Ichido... Naru ka Gohan to no Chōgattai" (Japanese: 奇跡は一度…なるか悟飯との超合体)	Yoshihiro Ueda	Hiroshi Toda	Naoaki Hōjō	June 7, 1995	November 1, 2002 (Ocean) November 6, 2002 (FUNimation)
268	253	"Merged!! Vegeta's Pride and Goku's Rage" / "Union of Rivals"; Transliteration: "Gattai!! Bejīta no Hokori to Gokū no Ikari" (Japanese: 合体!!ベジータの誇りと悟空の怒り)	Osamu Kasai	Hiroshi Toda	Kazuya Hisada	June 28, 1995	November 4, 2002 (Ocean) November 7, 2002 (FUNimation)
269	254	"Magnificent Power!! Vegetto Surpasses the Ultimate" / "Meet Vegito"; Transliteration: "Sōzetsu Pawā!! Kyūkyoku o Koeru Bejitto" (Japanese: 壮絶パワー!!究極を越えるベジット)	Kazuhito Kikuchi	Masashi Kubota	Masayuki Uchiyama	July 5, 1995	November 5, 2002 (Ocean) November 8, 2002 (FUNimation)
270	255	"A Fissure Between Dimensions!! Has Boo Snapped!?" / "Rip in the Universe"; Transliteration: "Jigen ni Kiretsu!! Bū ga Kirechatta!?" (Japanese: 次元に亀裂!!ブウがキレちゃった!?)	Yoshihiro Ueda	Masashi Kubota	Yukio Ebisawa	July 12, 1995	November 6, 2002 (Ocean) November 11, 2002 (FUNimation)
271	256	"The Ace Up Boo's Sleeve!! You Become a Hard Candy!" / "Vegito...Downsized"; Transliteration: "Bū no Oku no Te!! Amedama ni Natchae" (Japanese: ブウの奥の手!!アメ玉になっちゃえ)	Kazuhito Kikuchi	Masashi Kubota	Shingo Ishikawa	July 19, 1995	November 7, 2002 (Ocean) November 12, 2002 (FUNimation)
272	257	"A Hero Lost!? Vegetto is Absorbed" / "The Incredible Fighting Candy"; Transliteration: "Hīrō Sōshitsu!? Kyūshūsareta Bejitto" (Japanese: ヒーロー喪失!?吸収されたベジット)	Yamauchi Shigeyasu	Masashi Kubota	Yūji Hakamada	July 26, 1995	November 8, 2002 (Ocean) November 13, 2002 (FUNimation)
273	258	"A Demonic Maze!! What Is There Inside Boo's Belly!?" / "The Innards of Buu"; Transliteration: "Ma no Meikyū!! Bū no Onaka ni Nani ga Aru!?" (Japanese: 魔の迷宮!!ブウの腹（おなか）に何がある!?)	Yoshihiro Ueda	Masashi Kubota	Masayuki Uchiyama	August 2, 1995	November 11, 2002 (Ocean) November 14, 2002 (FUNimation)
274	259	"Nightmares or Illusions!? Goku and Gohan's Father-Son Confrontation" / "Mind Trap"; Transliteration: "Akumu ka Maboroshi ka!? Gokū to Gohan no Oyako Taiketsu" (Japanese: 悪夢か幻か!?悟空と悟飯の親子対決)	Kazuhito Kikuchi	Atsushi Maekawa	Keisuke Masunaga	August 9, 1995	November 12, 2002 (Ocean) November 15, 2002 (FUNimation)
275	260	"A Majin's Secret!! Two More Boos Inside of Boo" / "Deadly Vision"; Transliteration: "Majin no Himitsu!! Bū no Naka ni Futari no Bū" (Japanese: 魔人の秘密!!ブウの中に2人のブウ)	Yamauchi Shigeyasu	Atsushi Maekawa	Yukio Ebisawa	August 16, 1995	November 13, 2002 (Ocean) November 18, 2002 (FUNimation)
276	261	"Where Is the Exit!? Escape from a Collapsing Boo" / "Evil Kid Buu!"; Transliteration: "Deguchi wa Doko Da!? Kuzureru Bū kara Dasshutsu" (Japanese: 出口はどこだ!?崩れるブウから脱出)	Kazuhito Kikuchi	Atsushi Maekawa	Shingo Ishikawa	August 23, 1995	November 19, 2002 (FUNimation) February 7, 2003 (Ocean)
277	262	"Earth Disappears!! Boo's Reverse-Transformation of Evil" / "End of Earth"; Transliteration: "Chikyū Shōmetsu!! Bū Jaaku e no Gyakuhenshin" (Japanese: 地球消滅!!ブウ邪悪への逆変身)	Yoshihiro Ueda	Atsushi Maekawa	Yūji Hakamada	September 6, 1995	February 10, 2003 (Ocean) March 17, 2003 (FUNimation)
278	263	"Buu's Assault!! A Conclusion in the Kaioshin Realm" / "True Saiyans Fight Alone"; Transliteration: "Bū Raishū!! Kaiōshinkai de Ketchaku da" (Japanese: ブウ来襲!!界王神界で決着だ)	Osamu Kasai	Hiroshi Toda	Masayuki Uchiyama	September 13, 1995	February 11, 2003 (Ocean) March 18, 2003 (FUNimation)
279	264	"Seize the Future!! A Decisive Battle with the Universe at Stake" / "Battle for the Universe Begins"; Transliteration: "Mirai o Tsukame!! Uchū o Kaketa Daikessen" (Japanese: 未来をつかめ!!宇宙をかけた大決戦)	Yamauchi Shigeyasu	Hiroshi Toda	Keisuke Masunaga	September 20, 1995	February 12, 2003 (Ocean) March 19, 2003 (FUNimation)
280	265	"Vegeta Takes Off His Hat!! Goku, You Are No. 1" / "Vegeta's Respect"; Transliteration: "Bejīta Datsubō!! Gokū Omae ga Nanbā Wan da" (Japanese: ベジータ脱帽!!悟空おまえがNo.1だ)	Kazuhito Kikuchi	Hiroshi Toda	Naoki Miyahara	October 18, 1995	February 13, 2003 (Ocean) March 20, 2003 (FUNimation)
281	266	"Pull Through, Vegeta!! One Life-Threatening Minute" / "Minute of Desperation"; Transliteration: "Taenuke Bejīta!! Inochigake no Ippunkan" (Japanese: 耐え抜けベジータ!!命がけの1分間)	Yoshihiro Ueda	Masashi Kubota	Kazuya Hisada	November 1, 1995	February 14, 2003 (Ocean) March 21, 2003 (FUNimation)
282	267	"Don't You Pick on Satan!! The Original Boo is Revived" / "Old Buu Emerges"; Transliteration: "Satan o Ijimeru na!! Ganso Bū Fukkatsu" (Japanese: サタンをいじめるな!!元祖ブウ復活)	Jun'ichi Fujise	Masashi Kubota	Yukio Ebisawa	November 8, 1995	February 17, 2003 (Ocean) March 24, 2003 (FUNimation)
283	268	"Vegeta's Secret Plan!! Polunga and the Two Wishes" / "Earth Reborn"; Transliteration: "Bejīta no Hisaku!! Porunga to Futatsu no Negai" (Japanese: ベジータの秘策!!神龍（ポルンガ）と2つの願い)	Yamauchi Shigeyasu	Masashi Kubota	Masayuki Uchiyama	November 15, 1995	February 18, 2003 (Ocean) March 25, 2003 (FUNimation)
284	269	"A Last Hope!! We'll Make a Huge Genki Dama" / "Call to Action"; Transliteration: "Saigo no Kibō!! Tsukuru ze Dekkai Genkidama" (Japanese: 最後の希望!!作るぜでっかい元気玉)	Kazuhito Kikuchi	Atsushi Maekawa	Shingo Ishikawa	November 22, 1995	February 19, 2003 (Ocean) March 26, 2003 (FUNimation)
285	270	"Ultra-Impressive!! The Genki Dama From Everyone is Finished" / "People of Earth Unite"; Transliteration: "Chōkangeki!! Dekita ze Minna no Genkidama" (Japanese: 超感激!!できたぜみんなの元気玉)	Yoshihiro Ueda	Atsushi Maekawa	Tadayoshi Yamamuro	November 29, 1995	February 20, 2003 (Ocean) March 27, 2003 (FUNimation)
286	271	"Son Goku is Strongest After All!! Majin Boo is Eliminated" / "Spirit Bomb Triumphant"; Transliteration: "Yappari Saikyō Son Gokū!! Majin Bū Shōmetsu" (Japanese: やっぱり最強孫悟空!!魔人ブウ消滅)	Takahiro Imamura	Atsushi Maekawa	Yūji Hakamada	December 13, 1995	February 21, 2003 (Ocean) March 28, 2003 (FUNimation)
287	272	"Peace Returns!! Majin Boo, Champion of Justice!?" / "Celebrations with Majin Buu"; Transliteration: "Modotta Heiwa!! Seigi no Mikata Majin Bū!?" (Japanese: 戻った平和!!正義の味方魔人ブウ!?)	Mitsuo Hashimoto	Atsushi Maekawa	Kazuya Hisada	December 20, 1995	February 24, 2003 (Ocean) March 31, 2003 (FUNimation)
288	273	"You're Late, Goku! Everyone Party!!" / "He's Always Late"; Transliteration: "Osoi ze Gokū! Minna de Pāti!!" (Japanese: 遅いぜ悟空！みんなでパーティ!!)	Osamu Kasai	Atsushi Maekawa	Masayuki Uchiyama	January 10, 1996	February 25, 2003 (Ocean) April 2, 2003 (FUNimation)
289	274	"Grandpa Goku! I Am Pan!!" / "Granddaughter Pan"; Transliteration: "Gokū Ojiichan! Watashi ga Pan yo!!" (Japanese: 悟空おじいちゃん！私がパンよ!!)	Kazuhito Kikuchi	Masashi Kubota	Naoki Miyahara	January 17, 1996	February 26, 2003 (Ocean) April 3, 2003 (FUNimation)
290	275	"I Am Oob! Now Ten Years Old, the Former Majin!?" / "Buu's Reincarnation"; Transliteration: "Oira wa Ūbu! Ima Jussai de Moto Majin!?" (Japanese: オイラはウーブ！今10歳で元魔人!?)	Yoshihiro Ueda	Masashi Kubota	Yukio Ebisawa	January 24, 1996	February 27, 2003 (Ocean) April 4, 2003 (FUNimation)
291	276	"Even Stronger!! Goku's Dream is Super-Huge" / "Goku's Next Journey"; Transliteration: "Motto Tsuyoku!! Gokū no Yume wa Chō Dekkee" (Japanese: もっと強く!!悟空の夢は超でっけえ)	Takahiro Imamura	Masashi Kubota	Shingo Ishikawa	January 31, 1996	March 1, 2003 (Ocean) April 7, 2003 (FUNimation)

== OVAs/Movie specials ==
No.	Title	Directed by	Written by	Animation directed by	Original release date	English release date
1	"Dragon Ball Z Side Story: Plan to Eradicate the Saiyans"; Transliteration: "Doragon Bōru Zetto Gaiden: Saiyajin Zetsumetsu Keikaku" (Japanese: ドラゴンボールZ外伝 サイヤ人絶滅計画)	Yamauchi Shigeyasu	Takao Koyama	Masahiro Shimanuki	July 23, 1993 (Part 1); August 25, 1993 (Part 2)	N/A
This feature was released in two parts as an "Official Visual Guide" to the Famicom video game of the same title. It is notable for never having seen an official release outside Japan, unlike its 2010 remake. It was re-released with new scenes entitled "Dragon Ball Z Side Story: True Plan to Eradicate the Saiyans" for the Bandai Playdia system.
2	"Dragon Ball: Yo! Son Goku and His Friends Return!!"; Transliteration: "Doragon Bōru Ossu! Kaette Kita Son Gokū to Nakama-tachi!!" (Japanese: ドラゴンボール オッス！帰ってきた孫悟空と仲間たち！)	Yoshihiro Ueda	Written by : Takao Koyama; Story by : Akira Toriyama	Tadayoshi Yamamuro	September 21, 2008	N/A
This feature is the first Dragon Ball animation in twelve years, following a short story arc in the remade Dr. Slump anime series featuring Kid Goku and the Red Ribbon Army in 1999. The film premiered in Japan at the Jump Super Anime Tour in honor of Weekly Shōnen Jump's fortieth anniversary.
3	"Dragon Ball: Plan to Eradicate the Super Saiyans"; Transliteration: "Doragon Bōru: Suupaa Saiyajin Zetsumetsu Keikaku" (Japanese: ドラゴンボール 超サイヤ人絶滅計画)	Yamauchi Shigeyasu	Takao Koyama	Tadayoshi Yamamuro	November 11, 2010	November 2, 2010
This is a remake of the 1993 OVA Dragon Ball Z Side Story: Plan to Eradicate the Saiyans. It was released as a bonus feature with the video game Dragon Ball: Raging Blast 2. The feature was included worldwide, but was not dubbed in the appropriate language. Instead, the feature could only be viewed in Japanese with subtitles.
4	"Dragon Ball: Episode of Bardock"; Transliteration: "Doragon Bōru: Episōdo obu Bādakku" (Japanese: ドラゴンボール エピソード オブ バーダック)	Yoshihiro Ueda	Makoto Koyama	Tadayoshi Yamamuro	December 17, 2011	October 9, 2012
This 20-minute animated feature was adapted from the eponymous three-chapter manga by Naho Ōishi. It features a scenario taking place after the events of the television special Dragon Ball Z: Bardock - The Father of Goku, in which Bardock survives the destruction of Planet Vegeta and is sent into the past, combating Frieza's ancestor Chilled, and turning into a Super Saiyan. It was screened at Jump Festa 2012 (December 17 and 18, 2011) in Japan and internationally released in October 2012 as a subtitled extra to the Xbox 360 video game Dragon Ball Z: For Kinect.

== TV specials ==
No.	Title	Directed by	Written by	Animation directed by	Original release date	English air date
1	"Dragon Ball Z: Bardock – The Father of Goku"; Transliteration: "Doragon Bōru Zetto: Tatta Hitori no Saishū Kessen~Furīza ni Idonda Zetto Senshi Kakarotto no Chichi~" (Japanese: ドラゴンボールZ たったひとりの最終決戦～フリーザに挑んだZ戦士 孫悟空 (カカロット)の父～)	Mitsuo Hashimoto	Katsuyuki Sumisawa & Takao Koyama	Katsuyoshi Nakatsuru	October 17, 1990	September 5, 2002
2	"Dragon Ball Z: Summer Vacation Special"; Transliteration: "Kyokugen Batoru!! San Dai Sūpā Saiya-jin Supesharu" (Japanese: 極限バトル!!三大超サイヤ人 スペシャル)	Kōzō Morishita & Shin'ichi Fukumitsu	Takao Koyama	Minoru Maeda	August 3, 1992	N/A
This rare special aired on Tokai TV a month after the release of Dragon Ball Z: Super Android 13!, between episodes 148 and 155, and is set after the events thereof. Goku and Gohan meet in West city, dressed up in Tuxedos, and discuss the events of the nine previously released movies (the first three Dragon Ball Films, and the first six Dragon Ball Z films). This special has never been released in English, nor on any form of home media.
3	"Dragon Ball Z: The History of Trunks"; Transliteration: "Doragon Bōru Zetto: Zetsubō e no Hankō!! Nokosareta Chō-Senshi•Gohan to Torankusu" (Japanese: ドラゴンボールZ 絶望への反抗!!残された超戦士・悟飯とトランクス)	Yoshihiro Ueda	Hiroshi Toda	Minoru Maeda	February 24, 1993	September 12, 2002
4	"Looking Back at it All: The Dragon Ball Z Year-End Show!"; Transliteration: "Zenbu Misemasu Toshi Wasure Doragon Boru Zetto!" (Japanese: 全部見せます 年忘れドラゴンボールZ!)	Shigeyasu Yamauchi	Takao Koyama	Tadayoshi Yamamuro	December 31, 1993	N/A
This rare special aired on Fuji Television between episodes 211 and 212, and looks back at what had happened in Dragon Ball Z in 1993. It takes placed before the adult division of the 25th World Martial Arts Tournament into the Dragon Ball Timeline, as noted by Gohan at the end of the special. This special has not been released on DVD and it has not been translated to English either.
5	"Dream 9 Toriko & One Piece & Dragon Ball Z Super Collaboration Special!!"; Transliteration: "Dorīmu 9 Toriko & Wan Pīsu & Doragonbōru Z Chō Korabo Supesharu!!" (Japanese: ドリーム9 トリコ&ワンピース&ドラゴンボールZ 超コラボスペシャル!!)	Unknown	Unknown	TBA	April 7, 2013	March 4, 2023
This is a two-part crossover special which aired on April 7, 2013, on Fuji TV. It commemorated the start of the third year of the anime Toriko, and features characters from Dragon Ball Z, Toriko, and One Piece.

== See also ==
- List of Dragon Ball episodes
- List of Dragon Ball GT episodes
- List of Dragon Ball films
