= Dragon Ball Super (TV series) =

Japanese anime television series created by Akira Toriyama

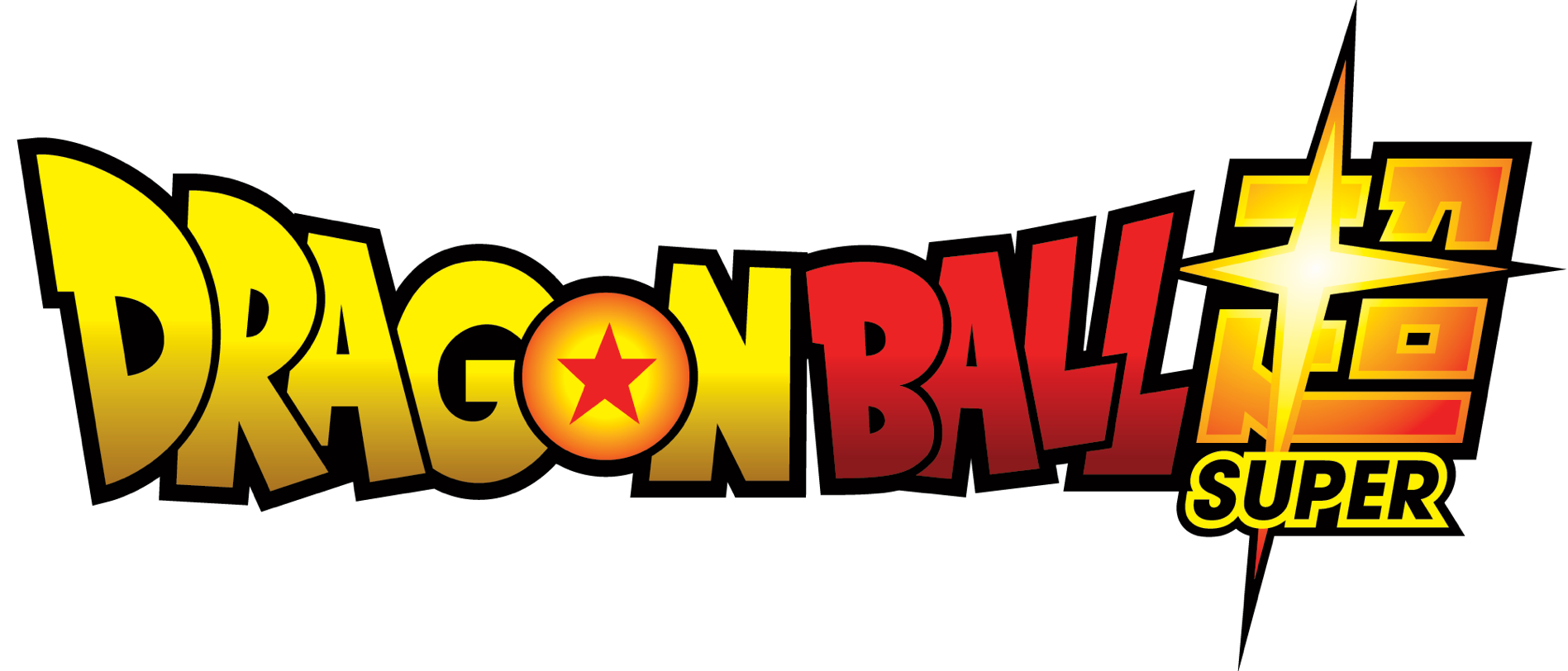
- ドラゴンボール超(スーパー); Doragon Bōru Sūpā
- Genre: Adventure; Fantasy comedy; Martial arts
- Based on: Dragon Ball by Akira Toriyama (Note: While based on the manga, the TV series initially served as an anime-exclusive midquel and did not adapt any published material during its original run. Toriyama provided story drafts, plot outlines, and core character designs for Toei Animation's staff to further develop. The Super manga, which was produced alongside the anime and also utilized the materials provided by Toriyama, eventually surpassed the TV series to begin producing its own story arcs.)
- Story by: Akira Toriyama
- Directed by: List: Kimitoshi Chioka (#1–46); Morio Hatano (#33–76); Kōhei Hatano (#68–76); Tatsuya Nagamine (#77–131); Ryōta Nakamura (#77–131)
- Voices of: Masako Nozawa; Ryō Horikawa; Toshio Furukawa; Mayumi Tanaka; Hiromi Tsuru (2015–2017); Aya Hisakawa (2018); Takeshi Kusao
- Narrated by: Jōji Yanami (#1–11); Naoki Tatsuta (#12–131)
- Music by: Norihito Sumitomo
- Opening theme: "Chōzetsu Dynamic!" by Kazuya Yoshii (#1–76); "Genkai Toppa × Survivor" by Kiyoshi Hikawa (#77–131)
- Ending theme: List: "Hello Hello Hello" by Good Morning America (#1–12); "Starring Star" by Keytalk (#13–25); "Usubeni" by Lacco Tower (#26–36); "Forever Dreaming" by Czecho No Republic (#37–49); "Yoka Yoka Dance" by Batten Girls (#50–59); "Chaohan Music" by Arukara (#60–72); "Aku no Tenshi to Seigi no Akuma" by the Collectors (#73–83); "Boogie Back" by Miyu Inoue (#84–96); "Haruka" by Lacco Tower (#97–108); "70cm Shihō no Madobe" by Rottengraffty (#109–121); "Lagrima" by OnePixcel (#122–131)
- Country of origin: Japan
- Original language: Japanese
- No. of episodes: 131 (list of episodes)

Production
- Producers: List: Naoko Sagawa; Atsushi Kido (#1–83); Osamu Nozaki (#1–53); Satoshi Teramoto (#26–46); Gyo Takami (#37–131); Shunki Hashizume (#50–131); Hiroyuki Sakurada (#77–131)
- Editor: Eiichi Nishimura
- Running time: 23 minutes
- Production companies: Fuji Television; Yomiko Advertising; Toei Animation

Original release
- Network: Fuji Television
- Release: July 5, 2015 – March 25, 2018

Related
- Dragon Ball Super: Beerus (2026–); List of all Dragon Ball series; List of all Dragon Ball films

Dragon Ball Super (Note: Japanese: ドラゴンボール超(スーパー), Hepburn: Doragon Bōru Sūpā) is a Japanese anime television series produced by Toei Animation, based on the manga series Dragon Ball by Akira Toriyama. The series aired in Japan on Fuji Television and its FNS affiliates from July 2015 to March 2018, spanning a total of 131 episodes. It was the first television series in the franchise to feature a new storyline in 18 years, serving as a midquel to Dragon Ball Z (1989–1996) and its remastered version Dragon Ball Z Kai (2009–2015), with the series' main story arcs based on original plot outlines written by Toriyama and adapted for the anime by Toei's writers and staff.

Set during the time frame of Toriyama's original manga, the series follows the adventures of Son Goku and his friends during the ten-year timeskip after the defeat of Majin Buu. The series begins with a retelling of the events of the Dragon Ball Z films Battle of Gods (2013) and Resurrection 'F' (2015) before telling new story arcs. Two sequel films were released: Broly (2018) and Super Hero (2022). An "enhanced edition" remake and remaster of the series, Dragon Ball Super: Beerus, premiered in October 2026, while a sequel to the anime and follow-up to the film Broly, Dragon Ball Super: The Galactic Patrol, is also in production.

The Dragon Ball Super manga, illustrated by Toyotarou, began serialization in Shueisha's shōnen manga magazine V Jump as a companion to the anime in June 2015. It is currently on hiatus following Toriyama's death in March 2024.

== Plot ==
=== God of Destruction Beerus Saga ===
In a retelling of the film Dragon Ball Z: Battle of Gods (2013), Son Goku works as a farmer and his family and friends live peacefully following the defeat of Kid Buu. However, the God of Destruction, Beerus, awakens after a dream about a warrior known as the Super Saiyan God, and along with his Angel assistant and teacher, Whis, threatens to destroy the Earth if the warrior loses to him. Goku uses the Dragon Balls and discovers that it takes six pure hearted Saiyans to achieve the transformation, which results in Goku becoming the Super Saiyan God. With the help of his friends, Goku battles Beerus and loses, but his efforts appease Beerus, who spares the planet and befriends Goku, allowing him to train on Beerus' world.

=== Golden Frieza Saga ===
In a retelling of the film Dragon Ball Z: Resurrection 'F' (2015), Goku and Vegeta train with Whis, while the remnants of the Frieza Force collect the Earth's Dragon Balls and resurrect him. After training for four months, Frieza returns to Earth, seeking revenge on Goku. Despite achieving his Golden transformation, he is defeated by Goku and Vegeta, who have mastered the Super Saiyan Blue (otherwise known as Super Saiyan God Super Saiyan), a transformation achieved by using and controlling God Ki. In spite, Frieza destroys the Earth, but Whis reverses time, allowing Goku to defeat Frieza.

=== Universe 6 Saga ===
Beerus's twin brother, Champa, the God of Destruction of Universe 6, and his assistant and Whis's older sister, Vados, visit Beerus while Goku and Vegeta are in the middle of training. Champa hosts a tournament against Universe 7, the one where Goku and his friends reside. Universe 7 wins the tournament and gets to use the Super Dragon Balls, which can be used to do anything that the user may desire. Beerus desires to restore Universe 6's Earth for Champa. The tournament draws the attention of Zeno, who is the ruler of all twelve universes. He wishes to watch another tournament involving the rest of the universes in the future and befriends Goku with a handshake.

=== Future Trunks Saga ===
Future Trunks returns with news of a new and powerful enemy with a dark and terrifying aura who resembles Goku, known as Goku Black, who has killed almost everyone in Future Trunks' timeline. They discover that Black's true identity is Zamasu, a Kaioshin apprentice from Universe 10 of an alternate timeline. Zamasu used the Super Dragon Balls to steal Goku's body from alternate timeline and kills him, and used the Time Ring to travel to Future Trunks' timeline to ally himself with Future Zamasu, as part of his plan to wipe out every mortal being. Ultimately, Fused Zamasu (the union between Black and Future Zamasu) and the future timeline are erased from existence by Future Zeno, who accompanies Goku back to the present, where he becomes Present Zeno's friend. Future Trunks and Future Mai leave for a new alternate timeline.

=== Universe Survival Saga ===
Both Zenos hold the Tournament of Power, where teams of ten fighters from eight of the twelve universes will battle, with defeated universes being erased from existence. Goku, Vegeta, Gohan, Piccolo, Krillin, Android 18, Tien Shinhan, and Master Roshi are joined by Android 17 and a temporarily revived Frieza. They battle formidable warriors, such as Universe 11's Jiren. Goku attains a legendary god transformation known as Ultra Instinct -Sign-, allowing him to fight unconsciously and with very precise moves while reaching Mastered Ultra Instinct. The tournament ends with Goku and Frieza eliminating Jiren along with themselves, leaving Android 17 as the winner for Universe 7. He is awarded one wish from the Super Dragon Balls, and restores the erased universes. As a reward for helping in the tournament, Frieza is permanently revived by Whis.

== Production ==
=== Development ===
In April 2015, Toei Animation announced that they were producing a new Dragon Ball anime television series, titled Dragon Ball Super. It would be the first anime series in the franchise to feature an new story since Dragon Ball GT (1996–1997). The first preview for the series aired on June 14, 2015, following episode 164 of Dragon Ball Z Kai. The next day, the main promotional image for Dragon Ball Super was added to its official website and unveiled two new characters, who were later revealed to be named Champa and Vados, respectively. A thirty-second trailer including the new characters was uploaded to the series' official website on June 26, 2015.

The anime series started with Kimitoshi Chioka acting as series director. Morio Hatano, series director of Saint Seiya Omega (episodes #1–51), began sharing the series director credit with Chioka beginning with episode #28, before taking it over completely with #47. From episode #47 to #76, Morio Hatano shared the role of series director with Kōhei Hatano (no relation), another storyboard artist and episode director for the series. Toei producer Atsushi Kido previously worked on Dragon Ball Z for a brief time during the Frieza arc, while Fuji Television producer Osamu Nozaki said he has been a fan of the series since childhood.

=== Writing ===
Dragon Ball Super was based on original story outlines and character designs by series creator Akira Toriyama, with individual episodes written by different screenwriters. The first 27 episodes readapt the events of the Dragon Ball Z films Battle of Gods and Resurrection 'F' with anime-original plot elements. Toriyama explained his involvement with the Future Trunks arc by saying that he created the story based on suggestions from the editorial department, "As with last time, I wrote the overall plot outline, and the scriptwriters have been compiling and expanded the story content into individual episodes, making various changes and additions, and generally doing their best to make the story more interesting."

=== Casting ===
Masako Nozawa reprises her roles as Son Goku, Son Gohan, and Son Goten. Most of the original cast reprise their roles as well. However, Jōji Yanami's roles as the North Kaio and the narrator were indefinitely taken over by Naoki Tatsuta as of episode 12, so that Yanami could take medical leave. Koichi Yamadera and Masakazu Morita also return from the last two Dragon Ball Z films as Beerus and Whis, respectively.

== Music ==
"Chōzetsu Dynamic!"
Sample of "Chōzetsu Dynamic!", performed by Kazuya Yoshii, the opening theme song for the first 76 episodes of the series.

Norihito Sumitomo, the composer for Battle of Gods and Resurrection 'F', is scoring Dragon Ball Super. An original soundtrack for the anime was released on CD by Nippon Columbia on February 24, 2016.

The first opening theme song for episodes 1 to 76 is "Chōzetsu Dynamic!" (超絶☆ダイナミック！, Chōzetsu☆Dainamikku!; "Excellent☆Dynamic!") by Kazuya Yoshii of The Yellow Monkey in both Japanese and English (as "Cho-Zets☆Dynamic!"). The lyrics were penned by Yukinojo Mori who has written numerous songs for the Dragon Ball series. The second opening theme song for episodes 77 to 131 is "Genkai Toppa × Survivor" (限界突破×サバイバー; "Limit Break × Survivor") by enka singer Kiyoshi Hikawa in Japanese and Nathan Sharp in English. Mori wrote the lyrics for the rock song, while Takafumi Iwasaki composed the music.

The first ending theme song for episodes 1 to 12 is "Hello Hello Hello" (ハローハローハロー) by Japanese rock band Good Morning America in Japanese and Jonathan Young in English. The second ending theme song for episodes 13 to 25 is "Starring Star" (スターリングスター) by the group Keytalk in Japanese and Professor Shyguy in English. The third ending song for episodes 26 to 36 is "Usubeni" (薄紅; "Light Pink") by the band Lacco Tower in Japanese and Jeff Smith in English. The fourth ending theme song for episodes 37 to 49 is "Forever Dreaming" by Czecho No Republic in Japanese and Mystery Skulls in English. The fifth ending theme song for episodes 50 to 59 is "Yoka Yoka Dance" (よかよかダンス, Yoka Yoka Dansu; "It's Fine Dance") by idol group Batten Girls in Japanese and Dani Artaud in English. The sixth ending theme song for episodes 60 to 72 is "Chaohan Music" (炒飯MUSIC, Chāhan Myūjikku) by Arukara in Japanese and Elliot Coleman in English. The seventh ending theme song for episodes 73 to 83 is "Aku no Tenshi to Seigi no Akuma" (悪の天使と正義の悪魔; "Evil Angel and Righteous Devil") by the Collectors in Japanese and William Kubley in English. The eighth ending theme song for episodes 84 to 96 is "Boogie Back" by Miyu Inoue in Japanese and Lizzy Land in English. The ninth ending theme song for episodes 97 to 108 is "Haruka" (遥) by Lacco Tower in Japanese and Zachary J. Willis in English. The tenth ending theme song for episodes 109 to 121 is "70cm Shihō no Madobe" (70cm四方の窓辺; "By a 70cm Square Window") by Rottengraffty in Japanese and Lawrence B. Park in English. The eleventh ending theme song for episodes 122 to 131 is "Lagrima" by OnePixcel in Japanese and Amanda Lee in English.

== Release ==
Dragon Ball Super began airing on July 5, 2015, and was broadcast on Sundays at 9:00 a.m. on Fuji Television. On January 19, 2018, it was revealed that Super's timeslot would be replaced with GeGeGe no Kitarō starting on April 1, 2018. According to Amazon Japan, the final Blu-ray set indicated the series' end at episode 131. The series ended on March 25, 2018, with the conclusion of the "Universe Survival Saga". Fuji TV stated that there were no plans to continue the series at that time.

In January 2026, it was announced that the manga's "Galactic Patrol Prisoner" story arc would receive an anime adaptation, respectively titled Dragon Ball Super: The Galactic Patrol.

=== International release ===
An English-subtitled simulcast of Dragon Ball Super was made available in North America and Europe through Crunchyroll and Daisuki. Following the closure of Daisuki, the hosted Dragon Ball Super episodes were transferred to the Dragon Ball Super Card Game website in February 2018 and was available until March 29, 2019. On November 4, 2016, Funimation (currently known as Crunchyroll, LLC) announced the company acquired the rights to Dragon Ball Super through Toei Animation USA and would be producing an English dub, with many cast members of their previous English-language releases of Dragon Ball media reprising their respective roles. As well as officially announcing the dub, it was also announced they would be simulcasting the series on their streaming platform, FunimationNow. The Funimation English dub of Dragon Ball Super began airing on Adult Swim on Saturdays at 8 p.m., with an encore showing in their Toonami block later that night at 11:30 p.m. starting on January 7, 2017, alongside Dragon Ball Z Kai: The Final Chapters. Toei Animation Asia-Pacific has commissioned a separate English-language dub of Dragon Ball Super produced by Los Angeles-based Bang Zoom! Entertainment for the Asian market. It premiered on the Toonami channel in Southeast Asia (excluding Malaysia) and India on January 21, 2017. A sneak preview of the English dub's first episode aired on December 17, 2016. Production on the Bang Zoom! dub ended after episode 27 as Toonami Asia and India ceased transmission.

Later in March 2022, Cartoon Network started airing Dragon Ball Super in Hindi, Tamil, and Telegu. The first 26 episodes being licensed by Toei Asia-Pacific (Bang Zoom!) and the rest by Toei itself using the OkraTron 5000 dub. In Australia, ABC Me started airing the series on November 3, 2018, with a new episode every Saturday at 2:45 pm. In the United Kingdom, the series aired on Pop from July 1, 2019, with episodes first airing at 7 pm on weekdays. As of 2022, the series now airs on CBBC and can also be found on the BBC iPlayer.

=== Home media release ===
In Japan, the anime series was released on DVD and Blu-ray by Happinet between December 2015 and July 2018, with each "box" also containing textless opening and closing credits sequences and packaged with a booklet. In North America, Funimation began releasing the series from July 2017, again on both DVD and Blu-ray, containing both English-dubbed and English-subtitled Japanese versions; the Blu-ray releases generally also contain interviews with the English cast and textless opening/closing credits sequences. Funimation's localized releases are distributed in the United Kingdom and Australasia by Manga Entertainment and Madman Entertainment respectively.

==== Japanese ====
Name	Date	Discs	Episodes
Box 1	December 2, 2015	2	1–12
Box 2	March 2, 2016	2	13–24
Box 3	July 2, 2016	2	25–36
Box 4	October 4, 2016	2	37–48
Box 5	January 6, 2017	2	49–60
Box 6	April 4, 2017	2	61–72
Box 7	August 2, 2017	2	73–84
Box 8	October 3, 2017	2	85–96
Box 9	January 6, 2018	2	97–108
Box 10	April 3, 2018	2	109–120
Box 11	July 3, 2018	2	121–131
Complete Box 1	February 2, 2022	12	1–72
Complete Box 2	March 3, 2022	10	73–131

==== English ====
Name	Date			Discs	Episodes
Name	Region 1/A	Region 2/B	Region 4/B	Discs	Episodes
Part One	July 25, 2017	October 30, 2017	September 6, 2017	2	1–13
Part Two	October 3, 2017	January 29, 2018	December 6, 2017	2	14–26
Part Three	February 20, 2018	June 4, 2018	March 7, 2018	2	27–39
Part Four	June 19, 2018	August 6, 2018	August 15, 2018	2	40–52
Part Five	October 2, 2018	October 8, 2018	December 5, 2018	2	53–65
Part Six	January 8, 2019	February 18, 2019	March 6, 2019	2	66–78
Part Seven	April 2, 2019	September 23, 2019	June 5, 2019	2	79–91
Part Eight	July 2, 2019	October 28, 2019	September 4, 2019	2	92–104
Part Nine	October 8, 2019	December 9, 2019	December 4, 2019	2	105–117
Part Ten	January 14, 2020	January 20, 2020	March 4, 2020	2	118–131
Collection 1	—N/a	—N/a	December 5, 2018	8	1–52
Collection 2	—N/a	—N/a	October 9, 2019	8	53–104
Collection 3	—N/a	—N/a	October 7, 2020	4	105–131
Complete Collection	September 20, 2022	November 2, 2020	November 18, 2020	20	1–131

== Other media ==
=== Dragon Ball Super: Beerus ===
In January 2026, it was announced that Toei Animation was producing a remake / remastered version of Dragon Ball Super as part of Dragon Ball's 40th anniversary celebrations. Beginning with the Battle of Gods arc, the series premiered on Fuji Television and its FNS affiliates on October 11, 2026, under the title Dragon Ball Super: Beerus.

=== Manga ===
The manga adaptation is illustrated by Toyotarou, based on Akira Toriyama's original story outlines. It began serialization in Shueisha's shōnen manga magazine V Jump on June 20, 2015, two weeks before the anime series began airing. Although the anime ended in March 2018, the manga continued with original story arcs. The manga is currently on indefinite hiatus after Toriyama's death in March 2024.

=== Films ===
An animated film, Dragon Ball Super: Broly, was the first film in the Dragon Ball franchise to be produced under the Super chronology. Released on December 14, 2018, with a new art style, most of the film is set after the "Universe Survival" story arc (the beginning of the movie takes place in the past). A second Dragon Ball Super film was confirmed to be in pre-production on June 4, 2019, by Toei executive Akio Iyoku. Iyoku feels that the film's original story "will probably be totally different [from Broly]." On July 23, 2021, the sequel's official title was revealed as Dragon Ball Super: Super Hero. The film was released in Japan on June 11, 2022, and internationally on August 19, 2022.

=== Merchandise ===
Bandai announced that a line of Dragon Ball Super toys would be available in the United States in summer 2017. Bandai has also announced the updated Dragon Ball Super Card Game that starts with one starter deck, one special pack containing 4 booster packs and a promotional Vegeta card and a booster box with 24 packs. It was released on July 28, 2017. A line of six Dragon Ball Super Happy Meal toys were made available at Japanese McDonald's restaurants in May 2017.

== Reception ==
The anime television series received generally positive reviews from critics and fans. The first episode was highly praised from initial reactions for its improved quality. Richard Eisenbeis of Kotaku praised the series' title sequence and said "My middle-school self is so happy right now, you guys." Jamieson Cox of The Verge also praised the title sequence and said that "Dragon Ball Super's intro will have you begging for its North American release". Cox was also surprised that, considering how popular the franchise is, the series did not launch internationally at the same time. He called it "a move that wouldn't be unprecedented" giving Sailor Moon Crystal as an example.

The original animation for episode 5 (left) was widely criticized by viewers and was redrawn for the Blu-ray and DVD release (right)

However, the fifth episode received harshly negative responses from Japanese and Western audiences due to its poor animation style compared to the previous four episodes. These problems continued at episode twenty-four, and several more episodes onward. Dragon Ball Kai and Resurrection 'F' producer Norihiro Hayashida felt that the criticism was overblown. He said that people were criticizing the entire series based on a few bad sequences that were done by new animators. He went on to explain a quality decline in the anime industry that he believes is the result of studios cutting time given for post-production and not allowing for reviews of the final product.

Despite this, the Champa arc was praised for improving its animation. Episode 39 was noted improved animation and praised fighting sequences. Attack of the Fanboy reported that "Dragon Ball Super" episode 39 may be the best installment of the series to date. Goku and Hit's fight "starts off explosively from the get-go." The Future Trunks arc also garnered positive response from fans and critics alike. IGN's Shawn Saris acclaiming episode 66, stating that, "episode 66 of Dragon Ball Super has a few missteps but ultimately leads to a great final battle with Zamasu." Anime News Network criticized the poor animation but praised the Goku Black narrative as "the most Super has allowed itself to be a shameless soap opera" based on the handling of the cast. In the same arc, Den of Geek noted Gohan's lighthearted self was not fit for Trunks' dark storyline and heavily contrasted the previous characterizations of Gohan Trunks used to see. In a later review, the same site enjoyed how the anime mocked Gohan's heroic persona but had mixed feelings in regards to its handling in gag episode. The site addressed fans' complaints about how Gohan's character was nearly forgotten by the staff members as well as his marriage with Videl.

The final arc, Universe Survival arc, particularly episodes, 109/110 and 116 have been cited as some of the Super series' best episodes due to Goku's new power up form known as the Ultra Instinct; Despite this praise, Jay Gibbs of ComicsVerse criticized the series for its inconsistent narrative, having heard "an explanation within an episode, then see that very explanation invalidated seconds later." Sam Leach from Anime News Network noted that fans of the series tend to joke Piccolo is a better paternal figure to Gohan than his actual father, Goku, and felt that Dragon Ball Super emphasized it more when Piccolo started training him again for this arc. On the other hand, Leach criticized how Super tries to teach "life lessons" to a mature Gohan. The fact that Piccolo calls him "arrogant", despite Gohan's kindness and humility, was seen as a bad plot point by the reviewer.

The United States premiere of Dragon Ball Super obtained 1,063,000 viewers for its 8 p.m. showing on Adult Swim. Episodes 130 and 131 were live streamed in various cities across Latin American countries including Mexico, El Salvador, Bolivia, Ecuador, and Nicaragua for free in public venues. The public screenings drew large record audiences, which included filling stadiums in Mexico and other Latin American countries, with each screening drawing audiences numbering in the thousands to the tens of thousands.

Dragon Ball Super has been criticized by fans for lacking the blood and gore that was present in its predecessor Dragon Ball Z. Animator Naotoshi Shida explained that television censorship no longer allows such content.

One episode of Dragon Ball Super episode received a complaint by Japan's Broadcasting Ethics and Program Improvement Organization as the part of the story involved Master Roshi attempting to sexually assault a female character.

=== Accolades ===
2017 Crunchyroll Anime Awards:

- Best Continuing Series – Dragon Ball Super – Nominated

2018 Crunchyroll Anime Awards:

- Best Fight Scene (Presented by Capcom) – Jiren vs. Goku – Nominated
- Best Continuing Series (Presented by VRV) – Dragon Ball Super – Winner
