= Su Lee =

South Korean musical artist (born 1997)

- Born: 1997 (age 27–28); South Korea
- Origin: Seoul, South Korea
- Genres: Indie pop
- Occupation: Musician
- Years active: 2019–present
- Website: www.suleesusu.com

Su Lee (born 1997) is a South Korean musician. She rose to fame in 2020 when her music video "I'll Just Dance" went viral on YouTube and Spotify. The song and music video were written and recorded in her 10' by 10' bedroom in Seoul, South Korea during the COVID-19 pandemic.

== Early life ==
Lee was born in and spent much of her childhood in South Korea, aside from a stint in Boston, Massachusetts, in elementary and middle school. She pursued a degree in International Relations at a university in Seoul, but transferred to Falmouth University to study graphic design for three years, graduating in 2019. She interned in London, living in a hostel for a month.

In September 2019, she left her graphic design job and turned her attention to music. The following May, she released "I'll Just Dance", which went viral on Reddit and has been watched more than 3.1 million times on YouTube as of December 2023.

In 2022, she embarked on two United States tours, supporting Chai and Mystery Skulls. She moved to the U.S. full time during the recording and production of her second album, Messy Sexy.

== Discography ==
- Box Room Dreams (August 26, 2021)
- Messy Sexy (October 28, 2022)
