= Dragon Ball Super Card Game =

Collectible card game

- Dragon Ball Super Card Game Fusion World; Dragon Ball Super Card Game Masters

- Backside of a Dragon Ball Super Card Game card.
- Named variants: Dragon Ball Super Card Game Fusion World; Dragon Ball Super Card Game Masters
- Publisher: Bandai
- Release date: Masters; July 2017; 9 years ago; Fusion World; February 2024; 2 years ago
- Type: Collectible card game
- Players: 2
- Age range: Everyone
- Cards: 50-60 per deck
- Play: Turns
- Playing time: 15 to 45 minutes
- Website: https://www.dbs-cardgame.com/

Dragon Ball Super Card Game Fusion World
- Developer: Bandai
- Publisher: Bandai Namco
- Series: Dragon Ball
- Platforms: Windows, macOS
- Release: Windows; February 24, 2024; 2 years ago; macOS; March 27, 2025; 19 months ago
- Genre: Digital collectible card game
- Mode: Online multiplayer

The Dragon Ball Super Card Game, often abbreviated as DBSCG, is a collectible card game developed by Bandai based on Dragon Ball. The game incorporates characters, locations, events, and other elements from across the Dragon Ball franchise, including Dragon Ball, Dragon Ball Z, Dragon Ball GT, Dragon Ball Super, Dragon Ball Daima and related films and video games.

Since August 2023, it exists in two variants:

- Dragon Ball Super Card Game Masters, released in July 2017 and is available in English, French and Italian;
- Dragon Ball Super Card Game Fusion World, released in February 2024 and is available in English and Japanese.

Fusion World was developed as a new game alongside the continuation of the original Dragon Ball Super Card Game. In 2023, Bandai announced that the existing game would continue under the name Dragon Ball Super Card Game Masters, while Fusion World would serve as a separate, newly developed card game. Although the two games share elements of their rules and setting, their cards, formats, card pools, and competitive environments are not interchangeable.

Unlike Masters, which had accumulated numerous mechanics and a large card pool since its original release in 2017, Fusion World emphasizes comparatively concise card text, streamlined mechanics, and aggressive combat. A free-to-play digital version of Fusion World was also released for Microsoft Windows and macOS.

== Dragon Ball Super Card Game Fusion World ==
Dragon Ball Super Card Game Fusion World (ドラゴンボールスーパーカードゲーム フュージョンワールド) is a collectible card game based on the Dragon Ball franchise and developed and published by Bandai. It was introduced in 2023 and launched in February 2024 as a separate game from the existing Dragon Ball Super Card Game, which was subsequently branded as Dragon Ball Super Card Game Masters.

Fusion World is a competitive, two-player trading card game in which players use decks consisting of a Leader card, Battle cards, and Extra cards. Decks are built around one of five distinct colors (Red, Blue, Green, Yellow or Black), with each color offering its own card pool, strategies, and playstyles. Players use Energy to play cards and activate abilities, while attacking their opponent's Leader and Battle cards. A player generally wins by reducing their opponent's Life to zero or otherwise satisfying a card-specific victory condition. A central feature of the game is the Awaken mechanic, which allows Leaders to transform into a more powerful state after meeting specified conditions.

Its card design and rules are derived in part from the original Dragon Ball Super Card Game, but Fusion World uses a substantially streamlined ruleset intended to provide more intuitive gameplay and a lower barrier to entry.

=== Starter Decks ===
List of Starter Decks:

Name	Code	Product type	Release date	Notes
Son Goku	FS01	Starter Deck	February 16, 2024	First Red Starter Deck.
Vegeta	FS02	Starter Deck	February 16, 2024	First Blue Starter Deck.
Broly	FS03	Starter Deck	February 16, 2024	First Green Starter Deck.
Frieza	FS04	Starter Deck	February 16, 2024	First Yellow Starter Deck.
Bardock	FS05	Starter Deck	August 9, 2024	First Black Starter Deck.
Son Goku (Mini)	FS06	Starter Deck	November 8, 2024	First Red Starter Deck based on Dragon Ball Daima.
Vegeta (Mini)	FS07	Starter Deck	November 8, 2024	First Blue Starter Deck based on Dragon Ball Daima.
Vegeta (Mini) Super Saiyan 3	FS08	Starter Deck	April 25, 2025	First Yellow Starter Deck based on Dragon Ball Daima.
Shallot	FS09	Starter Deck EX	June 13, 2025	First Black Starter Deck based on Dragon Ball Legends, featuring cards with illustrations from the game.
Giblet	FS10	Starter Deck EX	June 13, 2025	First Green Starter Deck based on Dragon Ball Legends, featuring cards with illustrations from the game.
The Beat of Ki	FS11	Starter Deck EX	March 13, 2026	Introduces the [Ki] mechanic.
The Phase of Evolution	FS12	Starter Deck EX	March 13, 2026	
The Saiyan Raised on Earth	FS13	Starter Deck	January 22, 2027	
The Prince of Saiyan	FS14	Starter Deck	January 22, 2027	

=== Booster Packs ===
List of Booster Packs:

Name	Code	Product type	Release date	Notes
Awakened Pulse	FB01	Booster Pack	February 23, 2024	First Booster Pack that supports the colors Red, Blue, Green and Yellow.
Blazing Aura	FB02	Booster Pack	May 10, 2024	
Raging Roar	FB03	Booster Pack	August 16, 2024	First Booster Pack that supports the color Black.
Ultra Limit	FB04	Booster Pack	November 15, 2024	
New Adventure	FB05	Booster Pack	February 14, 2025	First Booster Pack based on Dragon Ball Daima. Includes the first collaboration with Dragon Ball Z: Dokkan Battle, featuring cards with illustrations from the game.
Rivals Clash	FB06	Booster Pack	May 2, 2025	
Wish for Shenron	FB07	Booster Pack	September 19, 2025	Introduces the [Evolve] and [Dragon Ball] mechanics.
Saiyan's Pride	FB08	Booster Pack	December 12, 2025	
Dual Evolution	FB09	Booster Pack	March 13, 2026	Introduces the [Fusion Evolve] and [Ki] mechanics.
Cross Force	FB10	Booster Pack	June 12, 2026	
Brightness of Hope	FB11	Booster Pack	October 16, 2026	First Booster Pack featuring cards with illustrations from Dragon Ball Legends.
Reach the God	FB12	Booster Pack	December 18, 2026	First Booster Pack based on Dragon Ball Super: Beerus.

List of Special Booster Packs:

Name	Code	Product type	Release date	Notes
Manga Booster 01	SB01	Special Booster Pack	June 27, 2025	Special Booster Pack based on the Dragon Ball manga, featuring illustrations from Akira Toriyama.
Manga Booster 02	SB02	Special Booster Pack	November 14, 2025	Special Booster Pack based on the Dragon Ball manga, featuring illustrations from Akira Toriyama.
Story Booster 01	ST01	Special Booster Pack	August 21, 2026	Special Booster Pack featuring illustrations from the Dragon Ball Z anime.

== Dragon Ball Super Card Game Masters ==
Dragon Ball Super Card Game Masters was released by Bandai in July 2017. The game features characters and storylines from across the franchise, with players building decks using cards with different abilities and colors. Its gameplay has expanded through successive sets, introducing mechanics such as Union, Over Realm, Unison Cards and Z-Cards. The game also includes various supplementary products, including starter decks, themed boosters and special collector's sets.

=== Products ===
Dragon Ball Super Card Game Masters is supported by regular booster packs and expansion sets that introduce new cards, characters and gameplay mechanics based on the Dragon Ball franchise.

The initial expansion series began with Galactic Battle in 2017 and continued through Universal Onslaught in 2020. The subsequent Unison Warrior series introduced the Unison card type in 2020, while the ZENKAI series, launched in 2022, added Z-Cards, including Z-Leaders and Z-Battle Cards.

Other notable additions include the Over Realm mechanic, which uses the Warp as an out-of-play area, and the God Rare card rarity.

The game also includes preconstructed starter decks designed to introduce players to the game, as well as Expert Decks containing exclusive cards and supplementary play materials. However, new decks ceased to be produced since the release of Fusion World in 2024.

== See also ==
- Carddass
