= My Name Up in Lights =

Studio album by The Secret Handshake
- Released: April 21, 2009
- Recorded: December 2008
- Genre: Electronica
- Label: Triple Crown Records
- Producer: Luis Dubuc

The Secret Handshake chronology
One Full Year (2007)	My Name Up in Lights (2009)	Night & Day (2010)

My Name Up in Lights is The Secret Handshake's third full-length studio album. It was released on April 29, 2009 on Triple Crown Records. Luis Dubuc began writing songs for My Name Up in Lights immediately after he finished One Full Year and eventually ended with 60 songs to choose from for his follow-up album. Dubuc wrote, played, recorded, programmed and produced the whole record himself in his home studio.

The album reached No. 17 on the Billboard Heatseekers chart and No. 45 on the Independent Albums chart.

== Track listing ==
1. "All for You"
2. "TGIF"
3. "Nothing Can Change That"
4. "Little Song"
5. "What's Wrong"
6. "Saturday"
7. "Make Up Your Mind"
8. "Hey Girl"
9. "Brand New Love"
10. "Last Song"

iTunes bonus tracks:

15. "Better Off Alone" (Alice DeeJay cover)
16. "Make Up Your Mind" (Remix feat. Random Impulse)
