= Forever (Mystery Skulls album) =

Studio album by Mystery Skulls
- Released: October 27, 2014
- Recorded: 2013–14
- Genres: Synth-pop; electro funk; indie pop
- Length: 41:06
- Label: Warner Bros. Records
- Producers: Luis Dubuc; Cory Kilduff; John LaMonica

Mystery Skulls chronology
Mystery Skulls - EP (2011)	Forever (2014)	Ultra Rare Vol. 1 (2015)

Singles from Forever
- 1. "Ghost" Released: 2014; 2. "Paralyzed" Released: 2014; 3. "Number 1" Released: 2014; 4. "Magic" Released: 2014

Forever is the debut studio album by American DJ Luis Dubuc for his musical project Mystery Skulls. Produced by Dubuc, Cory Kilduff and John LaMonica, it was released on October 27, 2014, through Warner Bros. Records as the project's major label debut.

== Background ==
The project was formed in 2011 by Luis Dubuc after his previous project, The Secret Handshake, was dissolved. Dubuc initially announced the project on August 8, 2011, via the Mystery Skull's official Tumblr account, where they posted a video of the song Amazing. He later followed this post with a 5-song EP on December 30, 2011. Since then Mystery Skulls has performed in multiple college towns, signed with Warner Bros. Records, and has collaborated with multiple artists such as Brandy Norwood and Nile Rodgers.

== Reception ==
=== Critical ===
Professional ratings
Review scores
Source	Rating
Allmusic	4/5 stars

Critical reaction to Forever was mixed to positive. In an extremely positive review of the album, Matt Collar of Allmusic said: The debut full-length album from Los Angeles' Mystery Skulls, 2014's Forever, showcases the group's infectious, '80s-influenced disco, R&B, and dance-oriented soul. Primarily centered around the talents of lead singer, songwriter, and musical mastermind Luis Dubuc, Mystery Skulls make pulsing, laser-toned R&B that touches upon vintage '70s and '80s club music as much as it does contemporary R&B, techno, and EDM. In that sense, cuts like "The Future," "Fantasy," and "Forever" fit just as nicely alongside cuts by Daft Punk and Grum as they do tracks from such similarly inclined artists as Sam Sparro and Justin Timberlake. What helps set Mystery Skulls apart from the rest of the electro-R&B pack is Dubuc's lithe vocal abilities. Blessed with soulful phrasing, a burnished middle vocal range, and a knack for ascending into a lusty falsetto croon, Dubuc comes across as less the pulsating center of a robotic hive mind, à la Daft Punk, and more like an improbable cross between Fall Out Boy's Patrick Stump and '90s R&B prodigal son D'Angelo. It also doesn't hurt the album, or Dubuc's cred for that matter, that he's joined here on "Magic" and "Number 1" by both Chic guitar legend Nile Rodgers and '90s soul diva Brandy. Musically, while most of the songs on Forever are set to deep programmed grooves and heavy synth basslines, Dubuc nonetheless strikes an even balance between his use of synthesizer (his main instrument), real piano, drums, and orchestral strings. Ultimately, it's this sophisticated balance that helps Forever sound both organic and computerized, warmly familiar, and utterly fresh.

=== Commercial ===
The album debuted on Billboard 200 at No. 141, and No. 3 on the Dance/Electronic Albums chart, selling 3,000 units in its first week.

== Track listing ==
No.	Title	Length
1.	"Forever"	3:19
2.	"The Future"	3:43
3.	"Paralyzed"	3:08
4.	"Hellbent (feat. Snowblood)"	2:53
5.	"Fantasy"	3:13
6.	"Ghost"	4:19
7.	"Magic" (featuring Brandy & Nile Rodgers)	4:28
8.	"Number 1" (featuring Brandy & Nile Rodgers)	3:43
9.	"When I'm with You"	3:52
10.	"Body High"	3:20
11.	"Every Note"	5:08
Total length:		41:06

== Charts ==
Chart	Peak position
US Billboard 200	141
US Top Electronic Albums	3
US Top Heatseekers	2
