= Magic (Mystery Skulls song) =

Single by Luis Dubuc featuring Nile Rodgers and Brandy

from the album Forever
- Released: September 18, 2015
- Genre: Dance; disco; funk
- Length: 4:35
- Label: Warner
- Songwriters: Esjay Jones; Luis Dubuc; Mike Elizondo
- Producers: Luis Dubuc; Cory Kilduff

Mystery Skulls singles chronology
"Number 1" (2014)	"Magic" (2015)	"Soul on Fire" (2015)

Nile Rodgers singles chronology
"I'll Be There" (2015)	"Magic" (2015)	"The Other Boys" (2015)

Brandy singles chronology
"Wildest Dreams" (2012)	"Magic" (2015)	"The Girl Is Mine" (2015)

Music video
- "Magic" on YouTube

"Magic" is a song by American DJ Luis Dubuc, recorded for the debut studio album Forever (2014) of his electronica project Mystery Skulls. It was written by Esjay Jones, Dubuc, and Mike Elizondo, and produced by Dubuc and Cory Kilduff, featuring additional contribution from musician Nile Rodgers and R&B singer Brandy. "Magic" is a disco track with violins and a progressive thrust, with Rodgers on guitar and a vocal in which Dubuc sings alongside Brandy. The song was released as the album's fourth and final single. It was met with critical acclaim for its production and catchiness.

The song is featured in the Disney+ movie Magic Camp.

== Music video ==
Full music video

An animated music video for "Magic" was directed by French directing duo Double Ninja and produced by Cumulus. Telling a tale of love and creation, the gold-dipped CGI-clip was inspired by the ceremony scene in American film director Stanley Kubrick's final film, the erotic thriller Eyes Wide Shut (1999). The pair planned on creating something in a similar vein in a golden 3D setting. This proved to be particularly challenging as gold reflects light, and in three-dimensional space light can bounce all over the place. The video was released online on February 19, 2015.

Critically acclaimed, the video won both the Best Music Video and the Best Visual Effects category at the Los Angeles Independent Film Festival and Best Music Video at the IFS Film Festival 2015 and the Digitalmation Awards.

== Track listing ==
Remix single
No.	Title	Length
1.	"Magic" (Latroit Remix)	5:43
2.	"Magic" (Mozambo Remix)	4:43
3.	"Magic" (Etnik Remix)	4:42
4.	"Magic" (Sanchez Stealth Mix)	6:30
5.	"Magic" (Bynon Remix)	4:07
6.	"Magic" (Bingo Players' French Fried Rework)	4:19
7.	"Magic" (Tom Frankel Remix)	7:37
Total length:		37:41

== Charts ==
Chart performance for "Magic"
Chart (2015)	Peak position
Germany (Official Dance Chart)	18
