= Vickeblanka =

Japanese musician (born 1987)

- Also known as: Vickeblanka; Vicke Blanka
- Born: Junya Yamaike; November 30, 1987 (age 38); Toyoyama, Japan
- Genres: Anison; rock; J-pop
- Occupations: musician; singer; composer
- Instrument: Vocals
- Years active: 2014–present
- Label: Avex Trax
- Website: vickeblanka.com

Junya Yamaike, known professionally as Vickeblanka (also stylized as Vicke Blanka or VK Blanka), (born November 30, 1987) is a Japanese singer and composer signed on the Avex Trax label.

== Career ==
Since the beginning of his career, in 2014, he has created songs for anime, such as Black Clover and the Fruits Basket 2019 remake. He has released two studio albums, Wizard (2018) and Fate (2021) and a compilation album, BEST ALBUM SUPERVILLAIN. In 2023, he did his first Japan tour, called "Vicke Blanka Live House Tour 2023". In the same year, he released the EP Worldfly, which includes a documentary about his performances in Europe and in the Middle East, in addition to scenes from an important concert of the Japanese tour.

In 2024, he performed for the first time in Brazil at Anime Friends.

== Songs in anime ==
Lucky Ending (first ending of Fruits Basket)

Black Rover (third opening of Black Clover)

Black Catcher (tenth opening of Black Clover)

Buntline Special (ending of Double Decker! Doug & Kirill)

Walk (ending of Shiki Oriori)

Kan Peki No Peki (ending of Dragon Ball Super: Beerus)
