= Dragon Ball Collectible Card Game =

- Publishers: Bandai
- Years active: 2008–2009
- Players: 2
- Setup time: 5 minutes
- Playing time: 15 to 45 minutes
- Age range: Everyone
- Skills: Card playing Arithmetic Reading Strategy

Related games
- Dragon Ball Super Card Game

The Dragon Ball Collectible Card Game (Dragon Ball CCG) is a collectible card game based on the Dragon Ball franchise, first published by Bandai on July 18, 2008.

The game features exclusive artwork from the Dragon Ball anime (Dragon Ball, Dragon Ball Z and Dragon Ball GT).

The original game ended in 2009 and Bandai launched an all-new card game in 2017 called the Dragon Ball Super Card Game. This game consists of cards from Dragon Ball, Dragon Ball Z, Dragon Ball GT, Dragon Ball Super and Super Dragon Ball Heroes.

== Card Types and Rarity ==
The original release of the game includes four different types of cards: warrior, technique, event, and wish.

Warrior cards are characters who fight in the game, such as Goku, Gohan, Piccolo, Vegeta, Frieza, and Cell. These cards are the core of the game. They will determine whether the player wins or loses the match.

Technique cards are various attacks that can be used by the warriors in play against the opponent's warriors in battle, such as the Kamehameha, Spirit Bomb, or Final Flash. Technique cards are single-use. Once a warrior uses a technique, it goes to the player's chi area.

Various events in the series are also used in the game to change the dynamics of a battle. These cards stay in the game unless removed by a card effect or if the event card has a time limit.

Wish cards are cards based on wishes made in the series that can be used when the seven Dragon Balls are collected. A player can only wish once per game unless a card effect overrides the game rule.

There are different types of cards by rarity. Each booster pack includes nine randomly selected cards (6 common, 2 uncommon, 1 rare). Within these nine card packs, one parallel holographic card is randomly inserted (one guaranteed foil card of any rarity) and a Gold foil card (super rare) is inserted in a 1:6 pack ratio.

== Styles ==
The game features 5 different styles of cards: Super, Earth, Alien, Unique (mostly Namekian), and Villain.

- Super: Predominantly Z Warriors and their supporters.
- Earth: Humans and Earthlings.
- Alien: Things not from Earth, bad and good.
- Villain: Antagonists from Earth.
- Unique: Antagonists and protagonists from the franchise.

== Sets ==
=== Warriors Return ===
First released on 18 July 2008. Warriors Return is the first set released of the game in the United States. The set includes 113 cards and is based on only the Dragon Ball and Dragon Ball Z series. A 10-card booster pack includes 1 holographic foil card, 1 gold-stamped rare, 2 uncommon, 6 common; and in 1 of every 8 packs, a super rare foil card replaces the holographic foil card. The set has seen a 1st Edition and an unlimited print run.

=== The Awakening ===
The Awakening is the second set released by Bandai. It features 100 brand-new cards that include more powerful versions of the characters from the first set, like additional Super Saiyans and the only Super Namekian card ever printed in the game. There are no starter decks in this set but includes the same 10-pack boosters with the same type of cards. It was released on 17 October 2008.

=== Destructive Fury ===
Released early 2009, Destructive Fury contains 109 new cards, with more transformation conclusions, such as Cell (The Complete Form) and Mecha Frieza, and is the first set to feature cards from Dragon Ball GT. The only release ever to see a Super Saiyan 3 (Goku) printed in this game. The power level of the game has significantly risen with the release of the cards in this set and even a few promo cards were released with the introduction of Destructive Fury.

=== Fusion ===
101 new cards released in 2009. The only edition to include Wish cards released in an official set. Fusion introduces a new mechanic called "fusion" and the fusion deck. Under the new mechanic, two specific warriors can fuse into one warrior, whose card is placed into the fusion deck at the beginning of a game.

=== Clash of Sagas ===
The final release of the game as it stands, with 102 cards released in 2009. This set had a huge jump in the power level of cards. The release of dual chi symbol and dual chi cost cards have helped to smooth out the gameplay for decks built including multiple colors. Additional fusion warriors, including "Gogeta" have been printed. Numerous cards have been released that increase the power level of previous deck archetypes, such as "Namekian Fusion", "Pain and Power" or "King Cold". The only super rare event card has been released here. New keyword mechanics like "Expert" or "Backup" have been introduced.

== Starter Decks ==
=== The Warriors Return Starter Decks ===
There are two starter decks (Goku – starter Deck B and Frieza – starter deck A) with 30 cards each including super rare cards not found in booster packs and one of four special wish cards. Cards exclusive to these starter decks are:

- Captured
- Combination
- Emperor Pilaf's Wish
- Frieza – WA 048
- Frieza (The 3rd Form)
- Frieza's Henchmen
- Frieza's Last Wish
- Goku – WA 046
- Krillin – WA 047
- Oolong's Wish
- Power of the Instinct
- Upa's Wish

== Promotional Cards ==
There are only two cards officially released with the promo set description at the bottom left corner. These being "Goku" PR-01 and "Z Warriors Gather" PR-02. However, several other cards that have been released under specific sets are also considered promotional.

=== The Warriors Return Promo Cards ===
A small set of chibi cards have been released, showcasing the most iconic characters' first appearance in Dragon Ball:

- Goku
- Krillin
- Master Roshi
- Bulma

=== Destructive Fury Promo Cards ===
In early 2009, with the release of the third set Destructive Fury, Bandai released a small number of promotional cards technically as part of the set, in an attempt to draw in additional players:

- Dynamic Mess Em Up Punch
- Enormous Fighting Aura
- Exposure
- Gohan – WA 140
- Great Saiyaman – WA 141
- Mecha Frieza
- Special Fighting Pose
- Vegeta – WA 142

It is hypothesized that these promo cards were originally intended for a starter deck which was never released.

== Game Mats ==
Numerous Game mats have been released for the game: • The Warriors Return Goku super rare art • The Awakening Gohan (Super Saiyan) super rare art • Destructive Fury Trunks (Super Saiyan) super rare art • Destructive Fury Mecha Frieza art

== Rule Books ==
A printed booklet, version 1.1 is included with every Goku and Frieza starter set when purchased unopened. An updated rule book, version 1.3 was released with the Clash of Sagas set release and was mainly distributed in pdf format. In the latter version, the rules were revised and all the additional changes have been included, due to the large amount of new mechanics being introduced in Clash of Sagas.

== See also ==
- Dragon Ball Super Card Game
