= Ghost (Mystery Skulls song) =

Single by Luis Dubuc

from the album Forever
- Released: December 10, 2013
- Genre: EDM; nu disco
- Length: 4:18
- Label: Warner Bros.
- Songwriter: Luis Dubuc
- Producer: Luis Dubuc

Luis Dubuc singles chronology
| "Amazing" (2011) | "Ghost" (2013) | "Paralyzed" (2014) |

Music video
- "Ghost" on YouTube

"Ghost" is a song written, recorded, produced and performed by Venezuelan-American DJ and musician Luis Dubuc for his solo project Mystery Skulls. The track was released by Warner Bros. Records as the lead single off the project's debut album Forever described as an electro retro funk track, written, produced and performed by Dubuc, is about him wanting to "disappear completely and start over" after he didn't let anyone know about him moving from Dallas to Los Angeles, as reflected in the song's chorus. The official music video for the track, directed by Josh Thomas, was released in February 2014 by Vice Media's electronic music channel Thump. However, a second, animated music video for the song, which garnered over two million views in less than a month, helped put the track in the top 20 of the American Billboard Dance/Electronic Songs chart. The song was also very well received from music critics.

== Production and composition ==
"Ghost" is a four-minute, eighteen-second song described by Vibe as an "electro retro funk" track with harmonies influenced from disco. "Ghost" is about wanting to "disappear completely and start over" again, as it was inspired by Dubuc relocating from Dallas to Los Angeles without letting anyone know. The concept of the song is sung in the hook "This time I might just disappear." He described it as "really special song. The moment I wrote it, I thought, 'Wow, this could really be something." Written and produced by Dubuc, the original mix that appears on Mystery Skulls' debut album Forever was mixed by Jeremy Wheatley for 365 Artists at 4db Studios in London, with Adam Looker assisting. Colin Leonard mastered the track at SING Mastering in Atlanta using SING Technology.

== Release ==
Warner Bros. Records premiered the final mix of "Ghost" for streaming on December 10, 2013, and the song became available in digital stores by January 31, 2014. A remix by house producer Claude VonStroke was released on February 18, 2014 by Spin magazine, which journalist Chris Martins named a "demented dance-floor delight." A day later, Vice Media's channel Noisey released a remix by New York City-based duo Solidisco, advertised to "make you nostalgic for the long weekend just gone (thanks President's Day!), but super happy because Friday is just a little bit closer than it should be." Both re-workings were part of the song's remix EP that also featured remixes from Fred Falke, Thomas Newson and Viceroy. A re-cut by producer Martignetti that was not on the EP premiered on the blog Stoney Roads, who noted the song to be fitting in an episode of the HBO series Girls. "Ghost" was also included on the soundtrack for the game WWE 2K15, and Dubuc has admitted to being happy of being involved with the game: "I've been a really big fan for a long time, and they found out I was a fan, and it turns out that some of the people that work at WWE and in the game specifically are fans of Mystery Skulls and they were like, 'What the fuck? This is so cool! Let's do something together!'"

"Ghost" received widespread critical acclaim, with many reviewers highlighting its production, melodies, catchiness and Dubuc's vocals. One reviewer from Dance Music Northwest praised the song for putting Dubuc's diverse talent on display. However, a critic who reviewed Forever was more mixed on the song, calling it, along with "When I'm With You", to be "slightly lackluster and boring." The track also did well commercially; it debuted at its peak position of number 15 on the American Billboard Dance/Electronic Songs chart, issue dated November 22, 2014, and landed on the digital component of that chart in the top 20 the same week. It lasted on the Dance/Electronic chart for eighteen weeks, ending up at number 99 on the chart's 2015 year-end list.

== Music videos ==
The official video for "Ghost", produced by company Oh Yeah Wow and directed by Josh Thomas, parodies the 1973 horror film The Exorcist, but was also noted to spoof scenes from 1976's Carrie by one writer. It premiered on February 4, 2014 by Vice's electronic music channel Thump, who advertised it as "a really good video. It's got zombies. It's got a funny exorcist. It's got old people looking like they're about to poop their Depends. People (and things) fly through the air. It's neat, and it's all set to an extremely catchy beat." The video, which involves a priest who dances through the exorcism of a young woman, was well received by publications. This included a writer for Bloody Disgusting who called it "awesome", and another one who honored the choreography of the dancing priest as "seriously impressive".

The song's commercial success has been attributed to an animated music video by Ben Mangum, also known as MysteryBen27, that garnered more than two million views in under a month. Released on October 27, 2014, the Scooby-Doo-inspired video features a group of paranormal investigators running from danger in a haunted house, pursued by the ghost of their former team leader. PrinceofTheUniverse of Kotaku's Talk Amongst Yourselves favorably described the setting as "the most colorful, vibrant, psychedelic, funky fresh haunted mansion I've ever had the pleasure of laying eyes on". He also noted that "Everything happens on rhythm to the song which some may find a little cheesy cliche but it's a nice way to keep the viewer into what's happening visual while still enjoying the music. As if one can't exist without the other." The narrative was continued in three further music videos for the songs "Freaking Out", "Hellbent", and "The Future", released between 2016—2020, collectively accruing over one hundred million views by October 2026. The final video, "When I'm With You", was released on October 27, 2026, the 12th anniversary of the "Ghost" video. To coincide with the finale's premiere, a Mystery Skulls music pack was released for the rhythm game Rift of the Necrodancer on the same day; the pack contains all five songs from the video series, and features appearances by the video's characters.

== Track list ==
- Single
1. "Ghost" – 4:18
- Remix EP
1. "Ghost" (Solidisco Remix) – 3:38
2. "Ghost" (Fred Falke Remix) – 6:38
3. "Ghost" (Claude VonStroke Remix) – 6:15
4. "Ghost" (Thomas Newson Remix) – 4:25
5. "Ghost" (Viceroy Remix) – 4:20

== Charts ==
=== Weekly charts ===
| Chart (2014–15) | Peak position |
|---|---|
| US Dance/Electronic Songs (Billboard) | 15 |

=== Year-end charts ===
| Chart (2015) | Position |
|---|---|
| US Dance/Electronic Songs (Billboard) | 99 |
