= Night & Day (The Secret Handshake album) =

Studio album by The Secret Handshake
- Released: 2010
- Genre: Soul

The Secret Handshake chronology
My Name Up in Lights (2009)	Night & Day (2010)

Night & Day is the fourth and last studio album from The Secret Handshake. In the album, Luis Dubuc forwent the techno dance pop sound for mid 20th century Motown soul. The album uses more traditional instruments, displaying a more matured Dubuc. The album was released on August 17, 2010, preceded by the music video for "Domino".

== Track listing ==
1. Every Single Time 03:10
2. Woman 02:55
3. Domino 02:52
4. Fresh Start 02:31
5. Magic 03:13
6. You Got Me 03:27
7. Stop! 03:17
8. Black Girl 03:12
9. Is This Thing Through 03:19
10. Used To Be Sweet (feat. Lights) 02:54
11. Here's To You 03:25
12. Woman (Night Version) 03:39
13. Domino (Night Version) 03:04
14. Stop! (Night Version) 02:50
15. You Got Me (Night Version) 04:11
16. Magic (Night Version) 02:47
17. Fresh Start (Night Version) 02:33
18. Black Girls (Night Version) 03:07
19. Stop! (Night Version - Ver. 2.1) 03:25
