= One Full Year =

Studio album by The Secret Handshake
- Released: September 25, 2007
- Genre: Electronica
- Length: 56:06
- Label: Triple Crown
- Producer: Cory Kilduff, James Welsh

The Secret Handshake chronology
Summer of '98 (2007)	One Full Year (2007)	My Name Up in Lights (2009)

Professional ratings
Review scores
Source	Rating
Punk Bands	3/5 stars
Smart Punk	3.5/5 stars

One Full Year is The Secret Handshake's second full-length studio album. It was released on September 25, 2007, by Triple Crown Records. Produced by Cory Kilduff from The Rise. The song "Summer Of '98" was written about growing up in Texas.

== Track listing ==
1. Too Young
2. Summer Of '98
3. Coastal Cities
4. Wanted You
5. Everyone Knows Everyone
6. Denton, TX
7. Midnight Movie
8. Gamegirl
9. Pictures
10. Make You Mine
11. Don't Count On Me
12. I Lied About Everything
13. Lately
14. *crosses fingers*

iTunes bonus tracks:

15. Breathe In (iTunes bonus track)
16. Wake Up (iTunes bonus track)
