= Mystery Skulls (EP) =

EP by Mystery Skulls
- Released: December 28, 2011
- Genres: Electronica; indie pop
- Length: 16:04
- Producer: Luis Dubuc

Mystery Skulls chronology
Mystery Skulls (2011)	Forever (2014)

Singles from Mystery Skulls
- 1. "Amazing" Released: August 8, 2011

Mystery Skulls is the first EP by American indie pop/electronica band Mystery Skulls. It was produced by Luis Dubuc, the lead singer/songwriter of the group. It was released on December 28, 2011.

== Critical reception ==
Groove loves melody gave a positive review of the album: "Mystery Skulls, is bringing an infectious synth/dance EP. The sound is a slightly funkier Scissor Sisters with a hat tip to the musicality of San Serac and remembering Prince's falsetto." Sputnik Music said,

You hear that? That's the sound of your life being ruined. After you listen to Mystery Skulls debut EP you'll be humming its tracks non stop for years on end...Each of the tracks on this EP are stuffed full of pure unstoppable energy. Energetic melodies, catchy hooks, snappy beats, and compelling on mark falsetto vocals. On this EP are five outstanding tracks stuffed full of enticing and compelling energy that anyone can give a spin and walk away happy...even if you're walking away with every single last second of sound stuck on repeat in your head for three years.

== Track listing ==
No.	Title	Length
1.	"Amazing"	3:26
2.	"Money"	3:38
3.	"You"	2:56
4.	"Beautiful"	3:14
5.	"Brainsick"	2:50
Total length:		16:04

== Charts ==
Chart History	Peak position
Top Dance/Electronic Albums (Billboard)	23
