= Dragon Ball Super: Beerus =

Japanese animated television series

- ドラゴンボール超(スーパー) ビルス; Doragon Bōru Sūpā: Birusu
- Genre: Action; Adventure; Fantasy
- Based on: Dragon Ball by Akira Toriyama (Note: While based on the manga, Dragon Ball Super initially served as an anime-exclusive midquel and did not adapt any published material during its original run. Toriyama provided story drafts, plot outlines, and core character designs for Toei Animation's staff to further develop into the TV series. The Super manga, which was produced alongside the anime and also utilized the materials provided by Toriyama, eventually surpassed the TV series to begin producing its own story arcs.)
- Story by: Akira Toriyama
- Directed by: Matsuto Seya
- Voices of: Masako Nozawa; Koichi Yamadera; Ryō Horikawa
- Music by: Norihito Sumitomo
- Opening theme: "Onogami" by Megatera-Zero
- Ending theme: "Kanpeki no Peki" (Note: Stylized in Latin script as "Kan Peki No Peki") by VK Blanka
- Country of origin: Japan
- Original language: Japanese
- No. of episodes: 6

Production
- Executive producer: Keisuke Naitō
- Producers: Mamoru Kunihiro; Ryoichi Ishibashi
- Cinematography: Yōsuke Motoki
- Editor: Eiichi Nishimura
- Running time: 23 minutes
- Production company: Toei Animation

Original release
- Network: Fuji Television
- Release: October 11, 2026 – present

Related
- Dragon Ball Super (2015–2018); List of all Dragon Ball series; List of all Dragon Ball films

Dragon Ball Super: Beerus (Note: Japanese: ドラゴンボール超(スーパー) ビルス, Hepburn: Doragon Bōru Sūpā: Birusu) is a Japanese anime television series produced by Toei Animation, made in commemoration of the studio's 70th anniversary. Serving as an "enhanced edition" remake / remaster of the 2015 Dragon Ball Super anime series, it features a reconstructed narrative, updated visual composition, and revised animation direction. It premiered on Fuji Television and its FNS affiliates on October 11, 2026.

== Voice cast ==
Character	Japanese (Note: The series uses archived voice recordings from the original Dragon Ball Super anime series with the exception of Yamcha, who is re-voiced by Ryōta Suzuki, reprising the role from Dragon Ball Daima.)	English
Son Goku	Masako Nozawa	Sean Schemmel
Son Goten	Masako Nozawa	
Son Gohan	Masako Nozawa	Kyle Hebert
Beerus	Kōichi Yamadera	Jason Douglas
Whis	Masakazu Morita	Ian Sinclair
Vegeta	Ryō Horikawa	Christopher Sabat
Krillin	Mayumi Tanaka	Sonny Strait
Bulma	Hiromi Tsuru	Monica Rial
Yamcha	Ryōta Suzuki	Christopher Sabat
Chi-Chi	Naoko Watanabe	
Piccolo	Toshio Furukawa	Christopher Sabat
Trunks	Takeshi Kusao	
King Kai	Jōji Yanami	
Old Kai	Ryōichi Tanaka	
Mr. Satan	Unshō Ishizuka	

== Production ==
In January 2026, it was announced that Toei Animation was producing a remastered version of Dragon Ball Super as part of Dragon Ball's 40th anniversary celebrations. The series is a remastered and re-edited version of the original Super anime, featuring updated animation sequences, general visual improvements, and a reconstructed storyline with new and redrawn cuts. Akio Iyoku stated that the work began several years earlier and involves a reconstruction of the story, beginning with the Battle of Gods arc. The series is unit directed by Matsuto Seya, who is also in-charge of composition, while Tadayoshi Yamamuro is credited for animation character design and chief animation direction.

=== Music ===
Norihito Sumitomo returns from Dragon Ball Super to compose the music for the enhanced version of the series. The opening theme song is "Onogami" (オノガミ), performed by Megatera-Zero, while the ending theme song is "Kanpeki no Peki" (完璧のペキ), performed by VK Blanka.

== Release ==
Dragon Ball Super: Beerus premiered on October 11, 2026, at 11:15 p.m. on Fuji Television and its FNS affiliates, serving as the timeslot replacement for One Piece, which is set to go on hiatus until the following year. Prior to the Japanese broadcast, Toei Animation Inc. hosted the world premiere of the first episode at New York Comic Con during the Dragon Ball Super: Beerus special panel on October 8. The panel was hosted by Monica Rial, Bulma's English voice actress, with guests such as Jason Douglas and Ian Sinclair, the English voice actors of Beerus and Whis, respectively. Crunchyroll began streaming the series worldwide alongside other platforms such as Hulu in the United States, Disney+ in Canada and Latin America, and Mangas in France. Netflix also began streaming the series on October 14 in select international regions and on October 17 in the United States. Crunchyroll's English dub for the series premiered on its streaming service on November 12, 2026.

== Episodes ==
Saga	Episodes	Originally released	
Saga	Episodes	First released	Last released
God of Destruction Beerus (Note: Sometimes referred to as the Battle of Gods Saga)	6	October 11, 2026	November 15, 2026
Golden Frieza (Note: Sometimes referred to as the Resurrection 'F' Saga)	TBA	November 22, 2026	TBA

=== God of Destruction Beerus Saga (2026) ===
No. overall	No. in saga	Title	Corresponding DBS ep. (Note: Represents where the Dragon Ball Super episode footage was recycled from in relation to each Beerus episode. Most existing shots were re-composited over, while anything that was deemed unrecyclable got re-animated.)	Directed by (Note: Production staff information is taken from the ending credits of each episode.)	Storyboarded by	Animation directed by	Original release date
1	1	"The God Who Destroys"; Transliteration: "Hakai no Kami-sama" (Japanese: 破壊の神様)	1–2 (Note: This episode also includes an additional scene that was originally exclusive to the Super manga.)	Maya Asakura	Matsuto Seya	Tadayoshi Yamamuro	October 11, 2026
Four years after Goku and allies defeat Kid Buu, Chi-Chi makes Goku find a job. Goku becomes a farmer, but would rather spend his time training. When Goten brings him lunch, Goku takes a break to eat while Goten drives his tractor. Afterwards, Goku visualizes sparring matches against Frieza, Cell, and Kid Buu to burn off the meal. Later that evening, Mr. Satan arrives and offers Goku 100 million Zeni to support his family, feeling guilty for taking credit for defeating Buu. Goku initially refuses, but accepts the money after realizing it would allow him to resume full-time training. Meanwhile, Beerus, the God of Destruction, awakens from his long nap and enjoys a dinner hosted by inhabitants of a nearby planet. Although he likes their drink, he finds their food too greasy and decides to destroy half their planet. Old Kai senses this destruction and identifies Beerus as the culprit. Meanwhile, Goku visits King Kai to resume training. Later, on a primitive planet, Whis requests a dinosaur for Beerus to consume, but the local chief refuses. Beerus effortlessly parries the alien's attacks before destroying his planet. Watching its destruction, Beerus recalls a dream he had regarding a Super Saiyan God.
2	2	"The God of Destruction Heads to the Planet of the Kai"; Transliteration: "Hakai-shin Kaiō-sei e" (Japanese: 破壊神界王星へ)	3–5	Ryōta Nakamura	Matsuto Seya	Tadayoshi Yamamuro	October 18, 2026
Beerus investigates his dream by consulting with the Oracle Fish about its prophecy. Whis shows Beerus footage of Goku transforming into a Super Saiyan against Frieza and confirms that the Saiyan defeated the tyrant. Intrigued, Beerus decides to visit Goku. Meanwhile, Goku continues training on King Kai's planet, where the Kai inadvertently spills that the god is coming. Beerus later arrives and questions Goku about Super Saiyan God. Curious about Beerus' strength, Goku challenges him to a fight. Goku transforms into a Super Saiyan, but Beerus effortlessly dodges every attack. Even after ascending to Super Saiyan 2, Goku still can not land a hit. Goku transforms into Super Saiyan 3, finally peaking Beerus' interest. Beerus agrees to attack once he has witnessed Goku's full power, but remains completely unaffected by the Saiyan's strikes and Kamehameha. During a charge, Goku instinctively flies backwards without understanding why, as Beerus assumes he deliberately retreated. Beerus continues evading his attacks, and one of Goku's blasts tears through King Kai's planet. Finally, Beerus ends the fight by flicking Goku through the air and striking him into the ground with one shoulder tap. Having effortlessly defeated Goku, Beerus and Whis depart for Earth to visit Vegeta.
3	3	"The God of Destruction Heads to Earth"; Transliteration: "Hakai-shin Chikyū e" (Japanese: 破壊神地球へ)	6–8	Kokoro Kondō	Matsuto Seya	Tadayoshi Yamamuro	October 25, 2026
Goku regains consciousness, excited by Beerus' power and pondering whether training could make him a god. King Kai telepathically warns Vegeta, who recalls Beerus visiting Planet Vegeta during his childhood and humiliating King Vegeta. As Beerus arrives at Bulma's birthday party with Whis, Bulma welcomes them as Vegeta anxiously attempts to prevent anything from angering him. When Beerus demands pudding, Buu refuses to share with him, prompting Beerus to attack him. Beerus easily defeats Buu and overwhelms Trunks and Goten fused into Gotenks, followed by Tien, Android 18, Piccolo, and Gohan. When Bulma confronts Beerus, he accidentally knocks her out, enraging Vegeta. Transforming into Super Saiyan 2, Vegeta attacks Beerus with a relentless barrage of punches and a furious Galick Gun. Although Vegeta briefly catches Beerus off guard and sends him flying, the god effortlessly defeats him, revealing he has not used a tenth of his power in years. Having been irritated, Beerus decides to destroy the Earth. Bulma attempts to persuade him to spare the planet by promising him more delicacies. Beerus offers humanity one last chance through a game of rock-paper-scissors, choosing Oolong as his opponent because he mistakenly believes he is of the same race as Buu.
4	4	"The God of Saiyans"; Transliteration: "Saiya-jin no Kami" (Japanese: サイヤ人(じん)の神)	2, (Note: This episode incorporates Vegeta, Bulma, and Trunk's family vacation from episode 2 of Dragon Ball Super as a flashback scene.) 8–9	Kōta Tamakuma	Matsuto Seya & Tadayoshi Yamamuro	Tadayoshi Yamamuro & Kōji Watanabe	November 1, 2026
Oolong manages to pull two draws, but loses the final round. As Beerus prepares to destroy the Earth, Goku arrives and asks for one final chance to save the planet. He requests the Dragon Balls from Bulma so he can summon Shenron and ask about the Super Saiyan God. After learning that Beerus is the God of Destruction, Bulma agrees. Once summoned, Shenron explains that the Super Saiyan God is a figure from Saiyan mythology. According to the Namekian Book of Legends, the transformation is achieved when five pure-hearted Saiyans join hands and pour their hearts into another pure-hearted Saiyan. Piccolo believes they lack enough righteous Saiyans due to Vegeta, but Master Roshi and Chi-Chi defend him. Gohan, Goten, Trunks, and Vegeta begin the ritual with Goku, but Whis realizes they misunderstood the instructions. Six righteous Saiyans are required, and they must share their hearts rather than their ki. Videl reveals she is pregnant with Gohan's child. The group includes her in the next attempt. A brilliant pillar of light surrounds them as Goku transforms, emerging with a thinner physique and glowing red hair. Dende confirms that Goku has successfully become the Super Saiyan God that Beerus was looking for.
5	5	"The God of Destruction and Son Goku"; Transliteration: "Hakai-shin to Son Gokū" (Japanese: 破壊神と孫悟空)	10–13	Ayaka Noro	Matsuto Seya, Tadayoshi Yamamuro & Takao Kiriyama	Tadayoshi Yamamuro & Takeo Ide	November 8, 2026
After successfully becoming a Super Saiyan God, Goku challenges Beerus to another fight. The pair fly high above the ship to avoid endangering spectators. Nobody can sense Goku's energy because his new godly ki is beyond their abilities, which Whis explains only deities can sense. Initially, Goku struggles to control the new form, finding his body much lighter than before. He attempts a Kamehameha, but the attack misses Beerus and tears through the sea. As Goku gradually adjusts, he manages to catch and redirect one of Beerus' energy attacks before surprising him with a forehead flick and neck chop that the god previously used against him. Beerus declares that the real battle is about to begin, as Goku admits he has not used his full strength. The two exchange increasingly powerful attacks, with Goku destroying several of Beerus' energy spheres using his own techniques. Impressed by Goku's strength, Beerus finally decides to fight at full power. Goku remains calm despite having no strategy. Both fighters unleash their raw power, amazed by each other's abilities. However, Beerus notices something changing in Goku. The Super Saiyan God transformation is expiring, as Goku is unknowingly reverting back into his base Super Saiyan form.
6	6	"Battle of Gods"; Transliteration: "Kami to Kami" (Japanese: 神と神)	13–14, 19	Ryōta Nakamura	Matsuto Seya & Tadayoshi Yamamuro	Tadayoshi Yamamuro	November 15, 2026
Back on the cruise ship, the others realize Goku has lost his Super Saiyan God transformation. However, Beerus is surprised to discover that Goku's strength has not diminished. Beerus explains to Goku that he permanently merged with the godly power. Their battle moves between the inner and outer atmosphere. Beerus overwhelms Goku, who rallies and pushes Beerus back before exhausting himself and reverting to base form. Beerus compliments his performance and prepares to finish the fight. As Goku falls toward Earth, he transforms into a Super Saiyan again, refusing to give up. His Kamehameha and Beerus' energy attack combine into an enormous sphere, which Goku nullifies with the last of his strength. Vegeta catches Goku as he falls onto the ship. Beerus prepares to destroy Earth, but suddenly falls asleep while charging his attack. Whis explains that using his power without warming up must have exhausted him and takes Beerus home. While traversing space, Beerus admits that he lied about fighting at full strength to draw out Goku's potential. Back on Earth, Gohan announces that he and Videl are expecting a child. Vegeta vows to surpass both Goku and Beerus. Meanwhile, Sorbet plans to travel to Earth to revive Frieza.

=== Golden Frieza Saga (2026) ===
No. overall	No. in saga	Title	Corresponding DBS ep.	Directed by	Storyboarded by	Animation directed by	Original release date
7	1	"Resurrection 'F'"; Transliteration: "Fukkatsu no Efu" (Japanese: 復活のF(エフ))	TBA	Kokoro Kondō	Matsuto Seya & Tadayoshi Yamamuro	Tadayoshi Yamamuro	November 22, 2026
8	2	"Revenge 'F'"; Transliteration: "Fukushū no Efu" (Japanese: 復讐のF(エフ))	TBA	TBA	TBA	TBA	November 29, 2026

== See also ==
- Dragon Ball Z Kai – A similar recut and remastered anime series that covers Dragon Ball Z
