= Batten Girls =

- Origin: Fukuoka Prefecture, Japan
- Genres: J-pop; pop; rock
- Years active: 2015–present
- Label: Colourful Records
- Website: but-show.com

Batten Girls (ばってん少女隊, Batten Shōjo Tai; stylized in English as BATTEN GIRLS) is a Japanese girl idol group, formed by Stardust Promotion in June 2015.

The group is based in Fukuoka Prefecture and is managed by Stardust Promotion's regional Fukuoka office.

== Members ==
Name	Color	Birth date and age	Notes
Ai Kiyama (希山 愛)	Green	January 10, 2000 (age 26)	
Riko Ueda (上田 理子)	Red	November 26, 2000 (age 25)	Leader
Kiina Haruno (春乃 きいな)	Yellow	July 18, 2001 (age 24)	Sub-leader. Returns on April 1, 2020 after 7 months of hiatus
Rirua Aoi (蒼井 りるあ)	Pink	December 10, 2006 (age 19)	Joined April 2, 2021
Miyu Yanagi (柳 美舞)	Light Blue	May 10, 2007 (age 18)	Joined April 2, 2021
Miu Airi (逢里 みう)	Light Purple	June 7, 2009 (age 16)	Joined March 9, 2025
Kokona Hinami (日南 心那)	Blue	August 30, 2011 (age 14)	Joined March 9, 2025

=== Former Members ===
Name	Color	Birth date and age	Notes
Arisa Nishigaki (西垣 有彩)	Pink	July 21, 2002 (age 23)	Graduated on April 29, 2020 to continue School.
Sora Hoshino (星野 蒼良)	Blue	November 14, 2003 (age 22)	Graduated on March 28, 2021 to continue School.
Sakura Seta (瀬田 さくら)	Purple	February 2, 2002 (age 24)	Graduated on December 7, 2024
Ayane Asai (浅井 アヤネ)	Orange	December 7, 2008 (age 17)	Graduated on February 6, 2026

== Discography ==
=== Singles ===
No.	Title	Release date	Format	Charts
No.	Title	Release date	Format	JPN Oricon
Indie (STARDUST)
1	"Batten Shōjo." (ばってん少女。)	September 30, 2015	CD	19
Major-label (Colourful Records)
2	"Osshoi!" (おっしょい！)	April 20, 2016	CD	10
3	"Yoka Yoka Dance" (よかよかダンス)	September 14, 2016	CD	10
4	"Special Day" (すぺしゃるでい)	February 15, 2017	CD	5
5	"MEGRRY GO ROUND"	December 6, 2017	CD	10
6	"Muteki no Venus" (無敵のビーナス)	May 9, 2018	CD	6
7	"BDM"	November 21, 2018	CD	7
8	"6STARS"	March 13, 2019	DL	-
Indie (Batten Records)
9	"Arigato-to" (ありがとーと)	June 21, 2020	DL	-
10	"Distance" (でぃすたんす)	July 1, 2020	DL	-
11	"Over"	July 8, 2020	DL	-
12	"Dance in the night"	July 15, 2020	DL	-
13	"MILLION SUMMERS"	July 22, 2020	DL	-
14	"Barikata Pride" (ばりかたプライド)	May 21, 2021	DL, Music Card	-
15	"FREE na Nami ni Notte" (FREEな波に乗って)	July 4, 2021	DL, Music Card	-
16	"Watashi, Koi Hajimetatteyo!" (わたし、恋始めたってよ！)	November 10, 2021	DL, Music Card	-
17	"OiSa -2021 ver.-"	December 4, 2021	CD, DL	-
18	"YOIMIYA"	March 18, 2022	DL, Music Card	-
19	"Kouno Minato"	June 29, 2022	DL, Music Card	-
20	"Antagatadokosa ~Amakuchi Shoyu Jitate~" (あんたがたどこさ〜甘口しょうゆ仕立て〜)	July 28, 2023	DL, Music Card	-
21	"Hinata Bell" (ヒナタベル)	December 7, 2023	DL, Music Card	-
22	"ureshiino"	March 22, 2024	DL, Music Card	-

=== Albums ===
No.	Title	Release date	Charts
No.	Title	Release date	JPN Oricon
Major-label (Colourful Records)
1	"Must Buy" (ますとばい)	June 21, 2017	15
2	"BGM"	June 19, 2019	8
Indie (Batten Records)
3	"Fun" (ふぁん)	October 28, 2020	-
4	"CUE-SAI" (九祭)	October 19, 2022	9
5	"CUE-DEN" (九伝)	November 13, 2024	-
