= OnePixcel =

Japanese idol girl group

- Origin: Japan
- Genres: J-pop
- Years active: 2015–2021
- Labels: Toho; Nippon Columbia
- Past members: Nanami Tanabe; Ami Kanuma; Ayaka Den; Raia Kozuka
- Website: www.onepixcel.jp

OnePixcel was a Japanese idol girl group formed in 2015. They released their debut EP, Zero, on June 22, 2016. They disbanded on June 25, 2021.

== History ==
OnePixcel was formed in late 2015 and debuted in June 2016 with the EP, Zero. Their first single "Tondeke / Analoganize" was released in November 2016, followed by their second single "Time" in April 2017. They released their first studio album, Monochrome, in October 2017. Their third single, "Lagrima", was released in March 2018 as their major label debut and was featured in Dragon Ball Super as the 11th ending theme. Their fourth single, "Sparkle", was released in August 2018, followed by their fifth single, "Girls Don't Cry" in December 2018, and their sixth single, "Final Call", in May 2019. They released their second studio album, Libre, in February 2020. They released their seventh and final single, "Sha La La La", in November 2020. They announced on March 29, 2021, that they would hold their final concert on June 25.

== Members ==
=== Final line-up ===
- Nanami Tanabe (田辺奈菜美)
- Ami Kanuma (鹿沼亜美)
- Ayaka Den (傳彩夏)

=== Former ===
- Raia Kozuka (狐塚来愛)

== Discography ==
=== Studio albums ===
Title	Album details	Peak chart positions	
Title	Album details	Oricon	Hot
Monochrome	Released: October 18, 2017; Label: Toho Entertainment Records; Formats: CD, digital download	143	—
Libre	Released: February 26, 2020; Label: Nippon Columbia; Formats: CD, digital download	48	89

=== Extended plays ===
Title	Album details	Peak chart positions	
Title	Album details	Oricon	Hot
Zero	Released: June 22, 2016; Label: Toho Entertainment Records; Formats: CD, digital download	179	—

=== Singles ===
Title	Year	Peak chart positions	Album
Title	Year	Oricon	Album
"Tondeke / Analoganize"	2016	143	Monochrome
"Time"	2017	139	Monochrome
"Lagrima"	2018	49	Libre
"Sparkle"	2018	25	Libre
"Girls Don't Cry"	2018	19	Libre
"Final Call"	2019	26	Libre
"Sha La La La" (シャラララ)	2020	25	Non-album single
