= Dragon Ball =

Japanese media franchise created by Akira Toriyama

- The logo for the original manga series
- Created by: Akira Toriyama
- Original work: Dragon Ball (1984–1995)
- Owner: Bird Studio/Shueisha
- Years: 1984–present

Print publications
- Book: Companion books
- Comics: Manga

Films and television
- Films: List of films
- Short films: Yo! Son Goku and His Friends Return!! (2008); Episode of Bardock (2011)
- Animated series: List of anime; Dragon Ball (1986–1989); Dragon Ball Z (1989–1996); Dragon Ball GT (1996–1997); Dragon Ball Z Kai (2009–2011; 2014–2015); Dragon Ball Super (2015–2018); Super Dragon Ball Heroes (2018–2024); Dragon Ball Daima (2024–2025); Dragon Ball Super: Beerus (2026–)
- Television specials: Bardock – The Father of Goku (1990); The History of Trunks (1993); A Hero's Legacy (1997)
- Direct-to-video: Plan to Eradicate the Saiyans (1993); Plan to Eradicate the Super Saiyans (2010)

Games
- Traditional: Carddass; Dragon Ball Z: The Anime Adventure Game; Dragon Ball Collectible Card Game
- Video games: List of video games

Audio
- Soundtracks: List of soundtracks

Official website
- en.dragon-ball-official.com

Dragon Ball (Japanese: ドラゴンボール, Hepburn: Doragon Bōru) is a Japanese media franchise created by Akira Toriyama. The series follows the adventures of protagonist Son Goku from his childhood through adulthood as he trains in martial arts. Along his journey, he makes several friends, becomes a family man, discovers his alien heritage, and battles a wide variety of villains, many of whom, like him, seek the mystical orbs called the Dragon Balls in order to summon a wish-granting dragon.

The original manga, written and illustrated by Toriyama, was serialized in Weekly Shōnen Jump from 1984 to 1995, with the 519 individual chapters collected in 42 tankōbon volumes by its publisher Shueisha. Dragon Ball was originally inspired by the classical 16th-century Chinese novel Journey to the West, combined with elements of Hong Kong martial arts films. Dragon Ball characters also use a variety of East Asian martial arts styles, including karate and Wing Chun (kung fu).

Toriyama's manga was adapted and divided into two anime series produced by Toei Animation: Dragon Ball and Dragon Ball Z, which together were broadcast in Japan from 1986 to 1989 and 1989 to 1996, respectively. Additionally, the studio has developed 21 animated feature films and three television specials, as well as an anime sequel series titled Dragon Ball GT (1996–1997) and two anime midquel series titled Dragon Ball Super (2015–2018) and Dragon Ball Daima (2024–2025). From 2009 to 2015, Dragon Ball Z Kai aired as a revised version of Dragon Ball Z that follows the manga's story more faithfully by removing most of the anime-exclusive material, known as filler. A re-edited version of the early portion of Dragon Ball Super known as Dragon Ball Super: Beerus premiered in October 2026.

Several companies have developed various types of merchandise based on the series, leading to a large media franchise that includes films (both animated and live action), collectible trading card games, action figures, collections of soundtracks, and numerous video games. All these have contributed to making Dragon Ball one of the highest-grossing media franchises of all time.

The Dragon Ball manga has been published in over 40 countries and the anime has been broadcast in more than 80 countries. The manga's 42 collected tankōbon volumes have over 160 million copies sold in Japan and 260 million sold worldwide, (Note: Other sources estimate the total Dragon Ball tankōbon sales worldwide to be 260 or 300 million copies. See Dragon Ball (manga) § Reception for worldwide sales breakdown.) (Note: In addition to tankōbon sales, Dragon Ball had a total estimated circulation of approximately 2.96 billion copies in Weekly Shōnen Jump magazine. (Note: See Weekly Shōnen Jump § Manga series)) making it one of the best-selling manga series of all time. Dragon Ball has been praised for its art, characterization, humor, and broad audience appeal. It is widely regarded as one of the greatest and most influential manga series of all time, with many manga artists citing Dragon Ball as a source of inspiration for their own now-popular works. The anime, particularly Dragon Ball Z, is also highly popular around the world and is considered one of the most influential in increasing the popularity of Japanese animation in the Western world. It has had a considerable impact on global popular culture, referenced by and inspiring numerous artists, athletes, celebrities, filmmakers, musicians, and writers around the world.

== Setting ==
Earth, known as the Dragon World (ドラゴンワールド) and designated as "Planet 4032-877" by the celestial hierarchy, is the main setting of the Dragon Ball series, as well as related media such as Dr. Slump, Neko Majin, and Jaco the Galactic Patrolman. It is mainly inhabited by Earthlings (地球人, Chikyūjin), a term used inclusively to refer to all of the intelligent races native to the planet, including humans, anthropomorphic beings, and monsters. Starting from the Dragon Ball Z series, various extraterrestrial species such as the Saiyans (サイヤ人, Saiya-jin) and Namekians (ナメック星人, Namekku-seijin) have played a more prominent role in franchise media.

The narrative of Dragon Ball predominantly follows the adventures of the Saiyan Son Goku; upon meeting Bulma at the beginning of the series, the two embark on an adventure to gather the seven Dragon Balls, a set of orbs that summon the wish-granting dragon Shenlong.^{[ch. 1]} Goku later receives martial arts training from Kame-Sen'nin, meets his lifelong friend Kuririn, and enters the Tenkaichi Budōkai (天下一武道会; lit. 'Strongest Under the Heavens Martial Arts Tournament') to fight the world's strongest warriors. When Piccolo Daimao, and later his offspring Piccolo, tries to conquer the planet, Goku receives training from Earth's deities to defeat them. Goku later sacrifices his life to save the planet from his estranged brother Raditz,^{[ch. 205]} but is revived after training in the afterlife under the tutelage of the North Kaio to combat the other incoming Saiyans, Nappa and Vegeta. He later becomes a Super Saiyan and defeats the powerful alien tyrant Frieza; this sets the tone of the rest of the series, with each enemy the characters face becoming stronger than the last, requiring them to attain further training.

Dragon Ball Super establishes that the franchise is set in a multiverse composed of twelve (Note: Originally there were eighteen universes, but six of them were since erased by Zeno, a supreme deity.) numbered universes, with the majority of the Dragon Ball series taking place in Universe 7 (第7宇宙, Dai-Nana Uchū; lit. 'Number Seven Universe'). Each universe is ruled by a number of benevolent and malevolent deities, respectively called Kaioshin and Gods of Destruction who are appointed by a higher being called Zeno, the watcher of the multiverse.

== Production ==
Akira Toriyama was an avid fan of Hong Kong martial arts films, particularly Bruce Lee films such as Enter the Dragon (1973) and Jackie Chan films such as Drunken Master (1978), and wanted to create a manga inspired by the films of the genre. This led to Toriyama creating the 1983 one-shot manga Dragon Boy, which he later redeveloped into Dragon Ball. Toriyama loosely modeled the plot and characters of Dragon Ball on the classic Chinese novel Journey to the West, with Goku being Sun Wukong ("Son Goku" in Japanese), Bulma as Tang Sanzang, Oolong as Zhu Bajie, and Yamcha being Sha Wujing. Toriyama wanted to write a story with the basic theme of Journey to the West, but with "a little kung fu" by combining the novel with elements from the kung fu films of Chan and Lee. The title Dragon Ball was inspired by Enter the Dragon and later Bruceploitation knockoff kung fu films, which frequently had the word "Dragon" in their titles, and the fighting scenes were influenced by Jackie Chan movies. Since it was serialized in a shōnen manga magazine, he conceived the Dragon Balls to give it a game-like activity of gathering something, without thinking of what the characters would wish for. His concept of the Dragon Balls was inspired by the epic Japanese novel Nansō Satomi Hakkenden (1814–1842) from the late Edo period, which involved the heroes collecting eight Buddhist prayer beads; Toriyama adapted this into collecting seven Dragon Balls.

Toriyama originally thought the manga would last about a year or end once the Dragon Balls were collected. He stated that although the stories are purposefully easy to understand, he specifically aimed Dragon Ball at readers older than those of Dr. Slump. He also wanted to break from the Western influences common in Dr. Slump, deliberately incorporating for Chinese influences and scenery and referencing Chinese buildings and photographs of China his wife had bought. Toriyama wanted to set Dragon Ball in a fictional world largely based on Asia, taking inspiration from several Asian cultures including Japanese, Chinese, Indian, Central Asian, Arabic and Indonesian cultures. The island where the Tenkaichi Budōkai is held is modeled after Bali (in Indonesia), which he, his wife and assistant visited in mid-1985, and for the area around Bobbidi's spaceship, he consulted photos of Africa. Toriyama was also inspired by the jinn (genies) from The Arabian Nights.

The Earth of Dragon Ball, as published in Daizenshuu 4: World Guide

During the early chapters of the manga, Toriyama's editor, Kazuhiko Torishima, commented that Goku looked rather plain. Although the series debuted with an unusually high-profile launch, including five consecutive color pages, it was not initially very popular. At the beginning of its serialization, the series benefited from readers' expectations following Toriyama's previous hit Dr. Slump and strong editorial support. However, its popularity gradually declined, and it ranked as low as 15th in the magazine's reader surveys. Its table-of-contents placement also declined, appearing 7th for Chapter 7 and 12th for Chapter 31, leading to concerns that the series might be canceled.

To combat this, he added several characters such as Kame-Sen'nin and Kuririn, and created the Tenkaichi Budōkai martial arts tournament to focus the storyline on fighting. It was when the first Tenkaichi Budōkai began that Dragon Ball truly became popular, having recalled the races and tournaments in Dr. Slump. Anticipating that readers would expect Goku to win the tournaments, Toriyama had him lose the first two while planning an eventual victory. This allowed for more character growth as the manga progressed. He said that Muscle Tower in the Red Ribbon Army storyline was inspired by the video game Spartan X (known as Kung-Fu Master in the West), in which enemies appear in quick succession as the player ascends a tower (the game was in turn inspired by Jackie Chan's Wheels on Meals and Bruce Lee's Game of Death). He then created Piccolo Daimao as a truly evil villain, and as a result named that arc the most interesting to draw.

Once Goku and company had become the strongest on Earth, they turned to extraterrestrial opponents including the Saiyans (サイヤ人, Saiya-jin); and Goku himself was retconned from an Earthling to a Saiyan who was sent to Earth as a baby. Frieza, who forcibly took over planets to resell them, was created around the time of the Japanese economic bubble and was inspired by real estate speculators, whom Toriyama called the "worst kind of people". Finding the escalating enemies difficult, he created the Ginyu Force to add more balance to the series. When Toriyama created the Super Saiyan (超(スーパー)サイヤ人, Sūpā Saiya-jin) transformation during the Frieza arc, he was initially concerned that Goku's facial expressions as a Super Saiyan made him look like a villain, but decided it was acceptable since the transformation was brought about by anger. Goku's Super Saiyan form has blonde hair because it was easier to draw for Toriyama's assistant (who spent a lot of time blacking in Goku's hair), and has piercing eyes based on Bruce Lee's paralyzing glare. Dragon Ball Z character designer Tadayoshi Yamamuro also used Bruce Lee as a reference for Goku's Super Saiyan form, stating that, when he "first becomes a Super Saiyan, his slanting pose with that scowling look in his eyes is all Bruce Lee." Toriyama later added time travel during the Cell arc, but said he had a hard time with it, only thinking of what to do that week and having to discuss it with his second editor Yu Kondo. After Cell's death, Toriyama intended for Gohan to replace Goku as the series' protagonist, but later felt the character was not suited for the role and changed his mind.

Going against the convention that the strongest characters should be the largest in terms of physical size, Toriyama designed many of Dragon Ball's most powerful characters with small statures, including the protagonist, Goku. Toriyama later explained that he had Goku grow up as a means to make drawing fight scenes easier, even though his first editor Kazuhiko Torishima was initially against it because it was rare to have the main character of a manga series change drastically. When including fights in the manga, Toriyama had the characters go to uninhabited locations to avoid difficulties in drawing residents and destroyed buildings. Toriyama said that he did not plan the details of the story, resulting in strange occurrences and discrepancies later in the series, including changing the colors of the characters mid-story and few characters having screentone because he found it difficult to use. After the completion of Dragon Ball, Toriyama continued to add to its story, mostly background information on its universe, through guidebooks published by Shueisha.

During the second half of the series, Toriyama said that he had become more interested in coming up with the story than actually drawing it, and that the battles became more intense with him simplifying the lines. In 2013, he stated that because Dragon Ball is an action manga, the most important aspect is the sense of speed, so he did not draw very elaborate, going so far as to suggest one could say that he was not interested in the art. He also once said that his goal for the series was to tell an "unconventional and contradictory" story. In 2013, commenting on Dragon Ball's global success, Toriyama said, "Frankly, I don't quite understand why it happened. While the manga was being serialized, the only thing I wanted as I kept drawing was to make Japanese boys happy.", "The role of my manga is to be a work of entertainment through and through. I dare say I don't care even if [my works] have left nothing behind, as long as they have entertained their readers."

== Manga ==
The first Dragon Ball chapter debuted in Weekly Shōnen Jump No. 51, December 3, 1984.

Written and illustrated by Akira Toriyama, Dragon Ball was serialized in the manga anthology Weekly Shōnen Jump from December 3, 1984, to June 5, 1995, when Toriyama grew exhausted and felt he needed a break from drawing. The 519 individual chapters were collected in 42 tankōbon volumes by Shueisha from September 10, 1985, through August 4, 1995. Between December 4, 2002, and April 2, 2004, the chapters were re-released in a collection of 34 kanzenban volumes, which included a slightly rewritten ending, new covers, and color artwork from its Weekly Shōnen Jump run. The February 2013 issue of V Jump, which was released in December 2012, announced that parts of the manga would be fully colored and re-released in 2013. 20 volumes, beginning from chapter 195 and grouped by story arcs, were released between February 4, 2013, and July 4, 2014. 12 volumes covering the first 194 chapters were published between January 4 and March 4, 2016. A sōshūhen edition that aimed to recreate the manga as it was originally serialized in Weekly Shōnen Jump with color pages, promotional text, and chapter previews, was published in 18 volumes between May 13, 2016, and January 13, 2017.

=== Spin-offs ===
Another manga penned by Ōishi, the three-chapter Dragon Ball: Episode of Bardock that revolves around Bardock, Goku's father, was published in the monthly magazine V Jump from August to October 2011.

The final chapter of Toriyama's 2013 manga series Jaco the Galactic Patrolman revealed that it is set before Dragon Ball, with several characters making appearances in it. Jaco's collected volumes contain a bonus Dragon Ball chapter depicting Goku's mother.

In December 2016, a spin-off manga titled Dragon Ball: That Time I Got Reincarnated as Yamcha debuted in Shueisha's Shōnen Jump+ digital magazine. Written and illustrated by dragongarow LEE, it is about a high school boy who after an accident wakes up in the body of Yamcha in the Dragon Ball manga.

=== Crossovers ===
Toriyama also created a short series, Neko Majin (1999–2005), that became a self-parody of Dragon Ball. In 2006, a crossover between Kochira Katsushika-ku Kameari Kōen-mae Hashutsujo (or Kochikame) and Dragon Ball by Toriyama and Kochikame author Osamu Akimoto appeared in the Super Kochikame (超こち亀, Chō Kochikame) manga. That same year, Toriyama teamed up with Eiichiro Oda to create a crossover chapter of Dragon Ball and One Piece titled Cross Epoch.

=== Reception ===
Dragon Ball is one of the most popular and influential manga series of all time, and it continues to enjoy high readership. It is credited as one of the main reasons manga circulation was at its highest between the mid-1980s and mid-1990s. During Dragon Ball's initial run in Weekly Shōnen Jump, the manga magazine reached an average circulation of 6.53 million weekly sales, the highest in its history. During Dragon Ball's serialization between 1984 and 1995, Weekly Shōnen Jump magazine had a total circulation of over 2.9 billion copies, (Note: See Weekly Shōnen Jump § Circulation figures) with those issues generating an estimated ¥554 billion ($6.9 billion) in sales revenue.

Dragon Ball also sold a record number of collected tankōbon volumes for its time. By 2000, more than 126 million tankōbon copies had been sold in Japan alone. It sold over 150 million copies in Japan by 2008, making it the best-selling manga ever at the time. By 2012, its sales in Japan had grown to pass 156 million, making it the second best-selling Weekly Shōnen Jump manga of all time, behind One Piece. Dragon Ball's tankobon volumes sold 159.5 million copies in Japan by February 2014, and have sold over 160 million copies in Japan as of 2016.

The manga is similarly popular overseas, having been translated and released in over 40 countries worldwide. The total number of tankōbon volumes worldwide sold have reached 350 million copies. When including pirated copies, an estimated total of more than 400 million official and unofficial copies combined have been sold worldwide. (Note: Tally does not include unofficial pirated copies. When including the over 130 million unofficial pirated copies sold in China and South Korea, (Note: Additionally, more than 100 million unofficial pirated copies are estimated to have been sold in China, as of 2005.) (Note: Additionally, more than 30 million unofficial pirated copies are estimated to have been sold in South Korea, as of 2014.) an estimated total of more than 470 million official and unofficial copies have been sold worldwide.)

For the 10th anniversary of the Japan Media Arts Festival in 2006, Japanese fans voted Dragon Ball the third greatest manga of all time. In a survey conducted by Oricon in 2007 among 1,000 people Goku ranked first place as the "Strongest Manga Character of All Time." Goku's journey and his ever-growing strength resulted in the character winning "the admiration of young boys everywhere". Manga artists, such as One Piece creator Eiichiro Oda and Naruto creator Masashi Kishimoto, have stated that Goku inspired their series' main protagonists as well as series structure.

Manga critic Jason Thompson stated in 2011 that "Dragon Ball is by far the most influential shōnen manga of the last 30 years, and today, almost every Shōnen Jump artist lists it as one of their favorites and lifts from it in various ways." He says the series "turns from a gag/adventure manga to an nearly-pure fighting manga", and its basic formula of "lots of martial arts, lots of training sequences, a few jokes" became the model for other shōnen series, such as Naruto. Thompson also called Toriyama's art influential and cited it as a reason for the series' popularity. James S. Yadao, author of The Rough Guide to Manga, claims that the first several chapters of Dragon Ball "play out much like Saiyuki with Dr. Slump-like humour built in" and that Dr. Slump, Toriyama's previous manga, had a clear early influence on the series. He felt the series "established its unique identity" after the first occasion when Goku's group disbands and he trains under Kame-Sen'nin, and that was when the story developed "a far more action-packed, sinister tone" with "wilder" battles with aerial and spiritual elements and an increased death count, while humor still made an occasional appearance. Yadao claims that an art shift occurred when the characters "lose the rounded, innocent look that he established in Dr. Slump and gain sharper angles that leap off the page with their energy and intensity."

Animerica felt the series had "worldwide appeal", using dramatic pacing and over-the-top martial arts action to "maintain tension levels and keep a crippler crossface hold on the audience's attention spans". In Little Boy: The Art of Japan's Exploding Subculture, Takashi Murakami commented that Dragon Ball's "never-ending cyclical narrative moves forward plausibly, seamlessly, and with great finesse". Ridwan Khan from Animefringe.com commented that the manga had a "chubby" art style, but as the series continued, the characters became more refined, leaner, and more muscular. Khan preferred the manga over the slow pacing of the anime counterparts. Allen Divers of Anime News Network praised the story and humor of the manga as being effective at conveying all of the characters' personalities. Divers also called Viz's translation one of the best of all the English editions of the series due to its faithfulness to the original Japanese. D. Aviva Rothschild of Rationalmagic.com remarked the first manga volume as "a superior humor title". They praised Goku's innocence and Bulma's insistence as one of the funniest parts of the series.

The content of the manga has been controversial in the United States. In November 1999, Toys "R" Us removed Viz's Dragon Ball from their stores nationwide when a Dallas parent complained the series had "borderline soft porn" after he bought them for his four-year-old son. Commenting on the issue, Susan J. Napier explained it as a cultural difference. After the ban, Viz reluctantly began to censor the series to keep wide distribution. However, in 2001, after releasing three volumes censored, Viz announced Dragon Ball would return uncensored and reprinted due to fan reactions. In October 2009, Wicomico County Public Schools in Maryland banned the Dragon Ball manga from their school district because it "depicts nudity, sexual contact between children and sexual innuendo among adults and children".

In 2025, in reference to Texas Senate Bill 20, which creates new criminal offenses for those who possess, promote, or view visual material deemed obscene, which is said to depict a child, whether it is an actual person, an animated or cartoon depiction, or an image of someone created through computer software or artificial intelligence, Evan D. Mullicane of Screen Rant said the vague wording of the legislation made it "dangerous" for manga and anime such as Dragon Ball.

== Anime ==
Dragon Ball was adapted into an anime television metaseries. Dragon Ball (1986–89), Dragon Ball Z (1989–96), Dragon Ball Super (2015–18) and Dragon Ball Daima (2024–25) are set in a uniform main continuity, while Dragon Ball GT (1996–97) and Super Dragon Ball Heroes (2018–24) explore several alternate continuities.

=== Dragon Ball ===
Toei Animation produced an anime television series based on the first 194 manga chapters, also titled Dragon Ball. The series premiered in Japan on Fuji TV on February 26, 1986, and ran until April 19, 1989, lasting 153 episodes. It is broadcast in 81 countries worldwide.

=== Dragon Ball Z ===
Instead of continuing the anime as Dragon Ball, Toei Animation decided to carry on with their adaptation under a new name and requested a title from Akira Toriyama. The newly named Dragon Ball Z (ドラゴンボールZ(ゼット), Doragon Bōru Zetto; commonly abbreviated as DBZ) picks up five years after the first series left off and adapts the final 325 chapters of the manga. It premiered in Japan on Fuji TV on April 26, 1989, taking over its predecessor's time slot, and ran for 291 episodes until its conclusion on January 31, 1996. Two television specials based on the Z series were aired on Fuji TV in Japan. The first special, The One True Final Battle ~The Z Warrior Who Challenged Frieza – Son Goku's Father~, renamed Bardock – The Father of Goku by Funimation, was shown on October 17, 1990. The second special, Defiance in the Face of Despair!! The Remaining Super-Warriors: Gohan and Trunks, renamed The History of Trunks by Funimation, aired on February 24, 1993.

=== Dragon Ball GT ===
Dragon Ball GT (ドラゴンボールGT(ジーティー), Doragon Bōru Jī Tī; G(rand) T(ouring)) premiered on Fuji TV on February 7, 1996, and ran until November 19, 1997, for 64 episodes. Unlike the first two anime series, it is not based on Toriyama's original Dragon Ball manga, being created by Toei Animation as a sequel to the series or as Toriyama called it, a "grand side story of the original Dragon Ball." Toriyama designed the main cast, the spaceship used in the show, the design of three planets, and came up with the title and logo. In addition to this, Toriyama also oversaw production of the series, just as he had for the Dragon Ball and Dragon Ball Z anime. The television special episode, Goku's Side Story! The Proof of his Courage is the Four-Star Ball, or A Hero's Legacy as Funimation titled it for their dub, aired on March 26, 1997.

=== Dragon Ball Z Kai ===
In February 2009, Dragon Ball Z celebrated its 20th anniversary, with Toei Animation announcing that it would broadcast a re-edited and remastered version of the Dragon Ball Z anime under the name Dragon Ball Kai (ドラゴンボール改, Doragon Bōru Kai; lit. 'Dragon Ball Revised'). The series would be re-edited to follow the manga more closely, eliminating scenes and episodes which were not featured in the original manga, resulting in a more faithful adaptation, as well as in a faster-paced and more focused story. The episodes were remastered for HDTV, with rerecording of the vocal tracks by most of the original cast, and featured updated opening and ending sequences. On April 5, 2009, the series premiered in Japan on Fuji TV. Dragon Ball Z Kai reduced the episode count to 159 episodes (167 episodes internationally), from the original 291. Damaged frames were removed, resulting in some minor shots being remade from scratch in order to fix cropping, and others to address continuity issues. The majority of the international versions, including Funimation Entertainment's English dub, are titled Dragon Ball Z Kai.

=== Dragon Ball Super ===
On April 28, 2015, Toei Animation announced Dragon Ball Super (ドラゴンボール超, Doragon Bōru Sūpā), the first all-new Dragon Ball television series to be released in 18 years. It debuted on July 5 of that year and ran as a weekly series at 9:00 am on Fuji TV on Sundays until its series finale on March 25, 2018, after 131 episodes. Masako Nozawa reprised her roles as Goku, Gohan, and Goten. Most of the original cast reprised their roles as well. Koichi Yamadera and Masakazu Morita also reprise their roles, as Beerus and Whis, respectively.

The story of the anime is set after the defeat of Majin Buu, when the Earth has become peaceful once again. Akira Toriyama is credited as the original creator, as well for "original story and character design concepts". It is also being adapted into a parallel manga.

=== Super Dragon Ball Heroes ===
In May 2018, an anime to promote the Super Dragon Ball Heroes card and video game series was announced. It was released online from July 1, 2018, to August 8, 2024.

=== Dragon Ball Daima ===
Dragon Ball Daima aired on Fuji TV from October 2024 to February 2025. It features a storyline set after the events of the Majin Buu Saga of Dragon Ball Z but before Dragon Ball Super and the last few episodes of Dragon Ball Z. It is the last work of Akira Toriyama.

=== Dragon Ball Super: Beerus ===
Dragon Ball Super: Beerus premiered on Fuji Television on October 11, 2026. It is a re-edited and remastered version of the first three arcs of Dragon Ball Super with new animation.

=== Other installments ===
The short film Dragon Ball: Yo! Son Goku and His Friends Return!! was created for the Jump Super Anime Tour, which celebrated Weekly Shōnen Jump's 40th anniversary, and debuted on September 21, 2008. A short animated adaptation of Naho Ōishi's Bardock spinoff manga, Dragon Ball: Episode of Bardock, was shown on December 17–18, 2011, at the Jump Festa 2012 event.

A two-episode original video animation (OVA) titled Dragon Ball Z Side Story: Plan to Eradicate the Saiyans was created in 1993 as strategy guides for the Famicom video game of the same name. A remake titled Dragon Ball: Plan to Eradicate the Super Saiyans was created as a bonus feature for the PlayStation 3 and Xbox 360 video game Dragon Ball: Raging Blast 2, which was released on November 11, 2010.

A two-part hour-long crossover special between Dragon Ball Z, One Piece and Toriko, referred to as Dream 9 Toriko & One Piece & Dragon Ball Z Super Collaboration Special!! aired on April 7, 2013.

=== Reception ===
The anime adaptations have also been well-received and are better known in the Western world than the manga, with Anime News Network saying, "Few anime series have mainstreamed it the way Dragon Ball Z has. To a certain generation of television consumers its characters are as well known as any in the animated realm, and for many it was the first step into the wilderness of anime fandom." In a survey conducted by Oricon, "Japanese anime that I think is world-class" and "world-class Manga & Anime" "Dragon Ball" was selected as No. 1 with an overwhelming number of votes in both surveys. In 2000, satellite TV channel Animax together with Brutus, a men's lifestyle magazine, and Tsutaya, Japan's largest video rental chain, conducted a poll among 200,000 fans on the top anime series, with Dragon Ball coming in fourth. "Dragon Ball" won first place in the "100 Best Anime in Japan that has advanced to the world" questionnaire on TV Asahi 's " Decision! This is Japan's Best ". TV Asahi conducted two polls in 2005 on the Top 100 Anime, with Dragon Ball coming in second in the nationwide survey conducted with multiple age-groups and in third in the online poll.

Dragon Ball is one of the most successful franchises in animation history. The anime series is broadcast in more than 80 countries worldwide. In Japan, the first sixteen anime films up until Dragon Ball Z: Wrath of the Dragon (1995) sold 50 million tickets and grossed over ¥40 billion ($501 million) at the box office, in addition to selling over 500,000 home video units by 1996. Later DVD releases of the Dragon Ball anime series have topped Japan's sales charts on several occasions. In the United States, the anime series sold over 25 million DVD units by January 2012, and had sold more than 30 million DVD and Blu-ray units as of 2017. In Latin America, public screenings of the Dragon Ball Super finale in 2018 filled public spaces and stadiums in cities across the region, including stadiums holding tens of thousands of spectators.

Dragon Ball Z also proved to be a ratings success in the United States, outperforming top shows such as Friends and The X-Files in some parts of the country in sweeps ratings during its first season. The premiere of season three of Dragon Ball Z in 1999, done by Funimation's in-house dub, was the highest-rated program ever at the time on Cartoon Network. In 2002, in the week ending September 22, Dragon Ball Z was the #1 program of the week on all of television with tweens 9–14, boys 9–14 and males 12–24, with the Monday, Tuesday and Wednesday telecasts of Dragon Ball Z ranked as the top three programs in all of television, broadcast or cable, for delivery of boys 9–14. Dragon Ball GT also had high ratings In 2001, it was reported that the official website of Dragon Ball Z recorded 4.7 million hits per day and included 500,000+ registered fans. Dragon Ball Z topped the Lycos 50 list of the "most searched" items for the second consecutive year—the first time that any topic has ever been able to repeat its dominance over a two-year period. Dragon Ball ranked second overall in the search number ranking for the past 10 years, as reported by LYCOS in 2005. It ranked 3rd in Yahoo! in 2002 with the PlayStation 2 topping the list. Even after its conclusion, the Dragon Ball series has continued to maintain a high level of popularity, surpassing that of newer anime, and is also often rebroadcast, making it Funimation's most important anime license. The audience rating of the first Dragon Ball Kai episode on Nicktoons is the highest since the station launched.

Carl Kimlinger of Anime News Network summed up Dragon Ball as "an action-packed tale told with rare humor and something even rarer—a genuine sense of adventure." Both Kimlinger and colleague Theron Martin noted Funimation's reputation for drastic alterations of the script, but praised the dub. However, some critics and most fans of the Japanese version have been more critical with Funimation's English dub and script of Dragon Ball Z over the years. Jeffrey Harris of IGN criticized the voices, including how Frieza's appearance combined with the feminine English voice left fans confused about Frieza's gender. Carlos Ross of T.H.E.M. Anime Reviews considered the series' characters to be different from stereotypical stock characters and noted that they undergo much more development. Despite praising Dragon Ball Z for its cast of characters, they criticized it for having long and repetitive fights.

Dragon Ball Z is well-known, and often criticized, for its long, repetitive, dragged-out fights that span several episodes, with Martin commenting "DBZ practically turned drawing out fights into an art form." However, Jason Thompson of io9 explained that this comes from the fact that the anime was being aired alongside the manga. Dragon Ball Z was listed as the 78th best animated show in IGN's Top 100 Animated Series list, and was also listed as the 50th greatest cartoon in Wizard magazine's Top 100 Greatest Cartoons list.

Harris commented that Dragon Ball GT "is downright repellent", mentioning that the material and characters had lost their novelty and fun. He also criticized the GT character designs of Trunks and Vegeta as being goofy. Zac Bertschy of Anime News Network also gave negative comments about GT, mentioning that the fights from the series were "a very simple childish exercise" and that many other anime were superior. The plot of Dragon Ball GT has also been criticized for following a formula that was already used in its predecessors.

== Other media ==
=== Anime films ===
Twenty animated theatrical films based on the Dragon Ball series have been released in Japan. The most recent films, Dragon Ball Z: Battle of Gods (2013), Dragon Ball Z: Resurrection 'F' (2015), Dragon Ball Super: Broly (2018), and Dragon Ball Super: Super Hero (2022), were produced as full-length feature films and were given stand-alone theatrical releases in Japan, as well as limited theatrical releases in the U.S. They were also the first Dragon Ball films to have significant involvement from Toriyama. Battle of Gods and Resurrection 'F' were remade into the first and second arcs of the Dragon Ball Super anime, which told the same stories as the two films in expanded detail. The 1996 feature film, Dragon Ball: The Path to Power, was also a full-length theatrical release with a running time of 80 minutes, and was produced to coincide with the 10th anniversary of the anime as a re-imagining of the first few arcs of the series.

All previous films were mostly below feature length (around 45–60 minutes each), making them only slightly longer than one or two episodes of the TV series; this is due to them being originally shown as back-to-back presentations alongside other Toei film productions. These films are also mostly alternate re-tellings of certain story arcs (like The Path to Power), or extra side-stories that do not correlate with the continuity of the series. The first three films, along with The Path to Power, are based on the original Dragon Ball anime series. The remaining thirteen older films are based on Dragon Ball Z. The first five films were shown at the Toei Manga Festival (東映まんがまつり, Tōei Manga Matsuri), while the sixth through seventeenth films were shown at the Toei Anime Fair (東映アニメフェア, Toei Anime Fea).

=== Live-action film ===
Two unofficial live-action Dragon Ball films were released in the early 1990s. The first was a 1990 Korean film titled Dragon Ball: Ssawora Son Goku, Igyeora Son Goku (드래곤볼 싸워라 손오공 이겨라 손오공; Deulaegonbol Ssawola Son Ogong Igyeola Son Ogong; lit. 'Dragon Ball: Fight Son Goku, Win Son Goku'), while the second was a 1991 Taiwanese film titled Dragon Ball: The Magic Begins (新七龍珠; Xīn qī lóng zhū), which was also dubbed in English.

An American live-action film titled Dragonball Evolution was produced by 20th Century Fox after it acquired the feature film rights to the Dragon Ball franchise in March 2002. The film was directed by James Wong and produced by Stephen Chow, and was released in the United States on April 10, 2009. The film was meant to lead into sequels, which were cancelled after the film flopped at the box office and became universally heralded as one of the worst adaptations of all time, being considered by critics and fans as unfaithful to the source material. Franchise creator Akira Toriyama also criticized the film, adding he was completely left out of the creative process despite having offered to help, going as far as to say: "the result was a movie, I couldn't even call Dragon Ball". Years after its release, the writer of the film, Ben Ramsey, released a public apology in which he admitted to have written the film "chasing for a payday" instead of "as a fan of the franchise".

With the news of 20th Century Fox selling itself, its assets, which include the film rights to the Dragon Ball franchise, would now be owned by its purchaser, The Walt Disney Company. However, there have been no plans made by The Walt Disney Company to create a new live-action Dragon Ball movie. Dragon Ball Super: Super Hero was the first Dragon Ball film to be distributed in the U.S. by Sony Pictures after they acquired Crunchyroll in 2021 and merged it with Funimation in 2022. The first three episodes of Dragon Ball Daima were given a theatrical release in the U.S. by Toei Animation and Fathom Events.

=== Theme park attractions ===
"Dragon Ball Z: The Real 4D" debuted at Universal Studios Japan in the summer of 2016. It features a battle between Goku and Frieza. Unlike most Dragon Ball animation, the attraction is animated with CGI. A second attraction titled "Dragon Ball Z: The Real 4-D at Super Tenkaichi Budokai" debuted at Universal Studios Japan in the summer of 2017, which featured a battle between the heroes and Broly.

In March 2024, plans were announced for the construction of a Dragon Ball-themed amusement park in Qiddiya City, Saudi Arabia.

=== Video games ===
A Dragon Ball Z arcade conversion kit that includes the PCB, instructions and operator's manual

The Dragon Ball franchise has spawned multiple video games across various genres and platforms. Earlier games of the series included a system of card battling and were released for the Famicom following the storyline of the series. Starting with the Super Famicom and Mega Drive, most of the games were from the fighting genre or RPG (role-playing game), such as the Super Butoden series. The first Dragon Ball game to be released in the United States was Dragon Ball GT: Final Bout for the PlayStation in 1997. For the PlayStation 2 and PlayStation Portable games the characters were redone in 3D cel-shaded graphics. These games included the Dragon Ball Z: Budokai series and the Dragon Ball Z: Budokai Tenkaichi series. Dragon Ball Z: Burst Limit was the first game of the franchise developed for the PlayStation 3 and Xbox 360. Dragon Ball Xenoverse was the first game of the franchise developed for the PlayStation 4 and Xbox One. A massively multiplayer online role-playing game called Dragon Ball Online was available in South Korea, Hong Kong, and Taiwan until the servers were shut down in 2013. A few years later fans started recreating the game. Today, "Dragon Ball Online Global" is a new, European version of Dragon Ball Online and it is being developed, while open beta server is running.

The mobile game Dragon Ball Z: Dokkan Battle (2015) has received over 350 million downloads worldwide, as of 2021. A notable recent release is Dragon Ball FighterZ (2018), a fighting game developed by Arc System Works. The game received massive fan and critical acclaim for its fast paced frantic 3v3 battles and great visuals, also winning Best Fighting Game of 2018 at The Game Awards and many other awards and other nominations. It also has a large eSports scene, where it is one of the most popular fighting games. It also did very well commercially, selling 4 million units across all platforms.

=== Merchandise ===
In 1994, the licensee Bandai earned $140 million annually from sales of licensed Dragon Ball toys, video games and other character goods in Japan. In 1996, Dragon Ball Z grossed $2.95 billion in merchandise sales worldwide. As of early 1996, more than 100 companies outside Japan applied for character goods. Bandai sold over 2 billion Dragon Ball Carddass cards in Japan by 1998, and over 1 million Dragon Stars action figures in the Americas and Europe as of 2018. In 2000, Burger King sponsored a toy promotion to distribute 20 million Dragon Ball Z figures across North America. By 2011, the franchise had generated $5 billion in merchandise sales. In 2012, the franchise grossed ¥7.67 billion ($96.13 million) from licensed merchandise sales in Japan.

=== Soundtracks ===
Myriad soundtracks were released in the anime, movies and the games. The music for the first two anime Dragon Ball and Z and its films was composed by Shunsuke Kikuchi, while the music from GT was composed by Akihito Tokunaga and the music from Kai was composed by Kenji Yamamoto and Norihito Sumitomo. For the first anime, the soundtracks released were Dragon Ball: Music Collection in 1985 and Dragon Ball: Complete Song Collection in 1991; they were reissued in 2007 and 2003, respectively. For the second anime, the soundtrack series released were Dragon Ball Z Hit Song Collection Series. It was produced and released by Columbia Records of Japan from July 21, 1989, to March 20, 1996, the show's entire lifespan. On September 20, 2006, Columbia re-released the Hit Song Collection on their Animex 1300 series. Other CDs released are compilations, video games and films soundtracks as well as music from the English versions.

=== Companion books ===
Cover of Dragon Ball: The Complete Illustrations

There have been numerous companion books to the Dragon Ball franchise. Chief among these are the Daizenshuu (大全集) series, comprising seven hardback main volumes and three supplemental softcover volumes, covering the manga and the first two anime series and their theatrical films. The first of these, Dragon Ball: The Complete Illustrations (Daizenshuu volume 1), first published in Japan in 1995, is the only one that was released in English, being printed in 2008 by Viz Media. It contains all 264 colored illustrations Akira Toriyama drew for the Weekly Shōnen Jump magazines' covers, bonus giveaways and specials, and all the covers for the 42 tankōbon. It also includes an interview with Toriyama on his work process. The remainder have never been released in English, and all are now out of print in Japan. From February 4 to May 9, 2013, condensed versions of the Daizenshuu with some updated information were released as the four-volume Chōzenshū (超全集) series. For Dragon Ball GT, the Dragon Ball GT Perfect Files were released in May and December 1997 by Shueisha's Jump Comics Selection imprint. They include series information, illustration galleries, behind-the-scenes information, and more. They were out of print for many years, but were re-released in April 2006 (accompanying the Japanese DVD release of Dragon Ball GT) and this edition is still in print.

Coinciding with the 34-volume kanzenban re-release of the manga, and the release of the entire series on DVD for the first time in Japan, four new guidebooks were released in 2003 and 2004. Dragon Ball Landmark and Dragon Ball Forever cover the manga, using volume numbers for story points that reference the kanzenban release, while Dragon Ball: Tenkaichi Densetsu (ドラゴンボール 天下一伝説) and Dragon Ball Z: Son Goku Densetsu (ドラゴンボールZ 孫悟空伝説) cover the Dragon Ball and Dragon Ball Z anime, respectively. Much of the material in these books is reused from the earlier Daizenshuu volumes, but they include new textual material including substantial interviews with the creator, cast and production staff of the series. Son Goku Densetsu in particular showcases previously unpublished design sketches of Goku's father Bardock, drawn by character designer Katsuyoshi Nakatsuru prior to creator Akira Toriyama's revisions that resulted in the final version.

Following the release of Dragon Ball Kai in Japan, four new guidebooks were released: the two-volume Dragon Ball: Super Exciting Guide (ドラゴンボール 超エキサイティングガイド) in 2009, covering the manga, and two-volume Dragon Ball: Extreme Battle Collection (ドラゴンボール 極限バトルコレクション) in 2010, covering the anime series. Despite the TV series airing during this time being Kai, the Extreme Battle Collection books reference the earlier Z series in content and episode numbers. These books also include new question-and-answer sessions with Akira Toriyama, revealing a few new details about the world and characters of the series. 2010 also saw the release of a new artbook, Dragon Ball: Anime Illustrations Guide – The Golden Warrior (ドラゴンボール アニメイラスト集 「黄金の戦士」); a sort of anime-counterpart to the manga-oriented Complete Illustrations, it showcases anime-original illustrations and includes interviews with the three principal character designers for the anime. Each of the Japanese "Dragon Box" DVD releases of the series and movies, which were released from 2003 to 2006, as well as the Blu-ray boxed sets of Dragon Ball Kai, released 2009 to 2011, come with a Dragon Book guide that contains details about the content therein. Each also contains a new interview with a member of the cast or staff of the series. These books have been reproduced textually for Funimation's release of the Dragon Ball Z Dragon Box sets from 2009 to 2011.

=== Collectible cards ===
Collectible cards based on the Dragon Ball, Dragon Ball Z, and Dragon Ball GT series have been released by Bandai. These cards feature various scenes from the manga and anime stills, plus exclusive artwork from all three series. Bandai released the first set in the United States in July 2008.

=== Tabletop role-playing game ===
Dragon Ball Z: The Anime Adventure Game, a tabletop role-playing game produced by R. Talsorian Games, was published in 1999.
