= Luis Dubuc =

American singer

- Luis Dubuc performing as Mystery Skulls in Dallas

Background information
- Also known as: Mystery Skulls
- Born: Luis Alberto Dubuc Jr. January 28, 1985 (age 41); Caracas, Venezuela
- Origin: Dallas, Texas, United States
- Genres: Electronica, indie pop, soul, metalcore (former)
- Occupations: Musician, DJ, songwriter, music producer, drummer (former)
- Instruments: Keyboards, vocals, drums, guitar, programming, synthesizers
- Years active: 2004–present
- Labels: Triple Crown (Formerly), Warner Bros. (Formerly), MysterySkulls Music (Independent)
- Website: https://mysteryskullshq.com/

Luis Alberto Dubuc Jr. (born January 28, 1985) is a Venezualan-American DJ, musician, singer-songwriter, record producer and former drummer from Dallas, Texas. He was a member of The Secret Handshake and Of Legends. He is currently the man behind Mystery Skulls, an indie pop/electronica band.

== History ==
Luis Alberto Dubuc Jr. was born in Caracas, Venezuela on January 28, 1985, he and his family moved to Toronto, Canada when he was 8 years old and years later to Dallas, Texas but Dubuc went to live in Los Angeles (whose main inspiration for the song "Ghost").

He speaks Spanish fluently, but in an interview he said "I didn't want people to think I was a Latin singer like Enrique Iglesias. Not because those people are bad, because they make great music. But I didn't want anyone to get the wrong idea. I wanted a nondescriptive band's name so that the music can speak for itself."

=== Thirty Called Arson and The Secret Handshake (2004–2011) ===
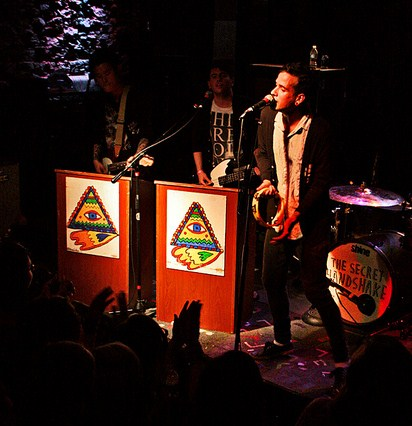
Dubuc performing as The Secret Handshake on July 16, 2010

Dubuc first got his start playing drums in a couple of bands with his friends, most notably in the hardcore unit Thirty Called Arson where he played in their live shows. Inspired by artists like Michael Jackson and Daft Punk, he eventually began writing and recording some songs as a side project in his Dallas-based bedroom with a laptop and Wurlitzer to assist him. By November 2004, Dubuc had self-released his first full-length album, entitled Antarctica. Less than a year later, he followed up with the EP This Is Bigger Than You and I, which was issued through Doll House Recordings. Momentum began building around his distinctive electronica laptop pop/rock, and The Secret Handshake developed a devoted fanbase. Another EP, Summer of '98 (referring to the summer before he started high school), was released in early 2007 through New York's Triple Crown Records, anchored by the vocoder-heavy title track. The full length One Full Year followed, becoming his full length Triple Crown Records debut.

In 2008 The Secret Handshake was featured on the Punk Goes Crunk compilation/covers album, where he covered Skee-Lo's rap classic "I Wish".

On April 29, 2009, The Secret Handshake released his third studio album, My Name Up in Lights. The album was recorded entirely in Dubuc's apartment in Dallas. In 2009, the album reached #17 on the Billboard Heatseekers chart and #45 on the Independent Albums chart.

The Secret Handshake opened for the Alternative Press Tour 2009, entitled The Fall Ball, which also featured You Me At Six, Set Your Goals, The Academy Is..., and Mayday Parade. Luis Dubuc was featured on the subscriber-only cover of Alternative Press November 2009 issue, along with the lead singers of the other bands featured on The Fall Ball tour with a feature article. The Secret Handshake toured in Australia from November 26 to December 6.

The Secret Handshake finished a two-month tour in the summer of 2010 with Every Avenue, Sing it Loud, and There for Tomorrow on the Motel 6 "Rock Yourself to Sleep" tour.

The Secret Handshake's fourth studio album Night & Day was released on August 17, 2010. Sound In The Signals complimented the new style found on the album, but criticized Dubuc's vocal ability. Alternative Press noted the new Motown sound was a risky move but stated that Dubuc "obviously had the skills to pull it off".

Luis Dubuc was interviewed in the Alternative Press October 2010 issue, in the feature article titled You Can Hurry Love.

=== Mystery Skulls (2011–present) ===
In 2011, Dubuc retired The Secret Handshake name and began to make music under the name Mystery Skulls. In 2013, Mystery Skulls signed with Warner Bros. Records. His debut album as Mystery Skulls featured collaborations with Nile Rodgers, Adam Lambert, and Avicii. Dubuc followed up with his sophomore album "One of Us" in 2017, originally envisioned to be a soundtrack for an accompanying film. In early 2018 Dubuc began airing live streams from his studio inviting fans to collaborate on his upcoming third album. Over the next several months he aired weekly videos on either YouTube or his Patreon. He released the first single from the forthcoming album "Don't F*ck With My Money" December 13, 2018. The album "Back to Life" was officially released on April 12, 2019.

As Mystery Skulls, Dubuc has performed across the country and has held many shows, and a summer tour to promote "Back To Life". Dubuc performed the fourth ending theme of Dragon Ball Super for its English release, "Forever Dreaming", originally performed in Japanese by Czecho No Republic.

== Mystery Skulls band members ==
=== Current members ===
- Luis Dubuc – vocals, electronics, production (2011–present)

=== Session and touring musicians ===
- Zack Ordway – guitars (2023–present; studio only 2014–2023)
- Sean William Friday – drums (2023–present)

== Discography ==
=== As The Secret Handshake ===
==== Albums ====
- Antarctica (2004)
- One Full Year (2007)
- My Name Up in Lights (2009)
- Night & Day (2010)

==== EPs ====
- This Is Bigger Than You and I (2005)
- Summer of '98 (2007)

==== Singles ====
- "Too Young" (2007)
- "Summer of '98" (2007)
- "Gamegirl" (2008)
- "Midnight Movie" (2008)
- "Saturday" (2009)
- "All for You" (2009)
- "Domino" (2010)

==== Mixtapes ====
- History in the Making, Vol. 1 (2008)

==== Compilations ====
- Punk Goes Crunk contributed the cover of I Wish by Skee-Lo (2008)
- Family Force 5 Album, Dance Or Die With A Vengeance, song titled Dance or Die (Secret Handshake Han Valen Remix)
- Contributed to the Suicide Season - Cut Up remix album by remixing the track Suicide Season by Bring Me the Horizon (2009)
- Remixed All Time Low's song "Weightless"

=== As Mystery Skulls ===
==== Albums ====
- Mystery Skulls - EP (2011)
- Forever (2014)
- Ultra Rare Vol. 1 (2015)
- One of Us (2017)
- Back to Life (2019)
- Now or Never (2020)
- Ultra Rare Vol. 2 (2020)
- Beam Me Up (2022)
- The Gold Album (2023)
- Ultra Rare Vol. 3 (2024)
- Maximum Joy (2025)
- Moving To New York Mixtape (2026)

==== Singles ====
- "Amazing" (2011)
- "Money" (2012)
- "Ghost" (2014)
- "Paralyzed" (2014)
- "Number 1" (featuring Brandy Norwood and Nile Rodgers) (2014)
- "Magic" (featuring Nile Rodgers & Brandy) (2014)
- "Soul On Fire" (2015)
- "Music" (2017)
- "Losing My Mind" (2017)
- "One of Us" (2017)
- "Erase Me" (2017)
- "Endlessly" (2017)
- "Don't F**k With My Money" (2018)
- "Stronger" (2019)
- "Back to Life" (2019)
- "Its Mine" (2019)
- "Far Away" (2019)
- "Now Or Never" (2020)
- "God" (2020)
- "Movies" (2021)
- "Be With You" (2022)
