= List of Dr. Slump chapters =

Cover of the first English volume of Dr. Slump, as published by Viz Media on May 3, 2005

Dr. Slump is a Japanese manga series, written and illustrated by Akira Toriyama. It was serialized in Weekly Shōnen Jump from issue No. 5/6 on February 4, 1980, to No. 39 on September 10, 1984. It received the 1981 Shogakukan Manga Award in the shōnen and shōjo category. The series follows the humorous adventures of the little girl robot Arale Norimaki, her creator Senbei Norimaki, and the other residents of the bizarre Penguin Village.

The 236 individual chapters were collected by Shueisha into 18 tankōbon volumes, which were published from August 9, 1980, to May 10, 1985. The series was reassembled into 9 aizōban volumes in 1990, and published as 9 bunkoban volumes from July 18, 1995, to April 18, 1996. Between October 4, 2006, and November 2, 2007, it was re-released as 15 kanzenban volumes. Dr. Slump was adapted into a 243 episodes anime series by Toei Animation titled Dr. Slump - Arale-chan, which aired on Fuji TV from to 1981 to 1986. A second anime, simply titled Doctor Slump, ran from 1997 to 1999 for 74 episodes.

Viz Media began publishing an English adaptation of Dr. Slump in 2005 with translation done by Alexander O. Smith and some censorship. All 18 original volumes have been released in North America as of May 5, 2009.

== Volume list ==
| No. | Title | Original release date | English release date |
|---|---|---|---|
| 1 | The Birth of Arale; Arare Tanjō no Maki (アラレ誕生！の巻) | August 9, 1980; 4-08-851181-6 | May 3, 2005; 978-1-59116-950-5 |
001. "The Birth of Arale" (アラレ誕生！の巻, Arare Tanjō! no Maki); 002. "Here Comes Arale!" (オ～ッス！の巻, Ōssu! no Maki); 003. "Something's Missing!" (･･･がない！の巻, ...ga nai! no Maki); 004. "Dr. Monster" (怪獣博士の巻, Kaijū Hakase no Maki); 005. "Which Will It Be?" (どれにしようかナ？の巻, Dore ni Shiyōka Na? no Maki); 006. "Bearly Friends!" (熊さん友達！の巻, Kuma-san Tomodachi! no Maki); 007. "Arale Is Akane!?" (アラレはアカネ!?の巻, Arare wa Akane!? no Maki); 008. "The Big-Small Gun!" (デカチビ銃！の巻, DekaChibi-jū! no Maki); 009. "1980: Living For Tomorrow!" (1980あしたにむかって！の巻, Senkyūhyakuhachijū Ashita ni Mukatte! no Maki); 010. "The Time Slipper" (タイムスリッパーの巻, Taimu Surippā no Maki); 011. "The Mysterious Egg" (なんのタマゴ？の巻, Nan no Tamago? no Maki); 012. "Is It A Girl? Is It A Boy?!" (男の子!?女の子!?の巻, Otoko no ko!? On'na no ko!? no Maki)
Penguin Village's scientist, Senbei Norimaki, finishes creating the perfect humanoid android named Arale. Although she is the perfect robotic girl with super strength, she is near-sighted. Senbei has Arale pose as his 13-year-old younger sister who he sends to Penguin Village Junior High School, where her teacher is Ms. Yamabuki, Senbei's dream girl. Arale makes friends with some of the kids there, most notably Akane, Taro and Peasuke. Senbei creates the See-Thru Glasses so he can see girls naked but ends up breaking when getting hit by a scooter. Arale makes friends with a man who is a giant monster movie fan who tried to kidnap her. Arale and Senbei release a captive bear into the wild and convert it to a cyborg to for it to survive being shot by a hunter. Senbei on the other hand busts out some new inventions as well as his Big-Small Gun that turns things from big to small. Arale finds his old Future Camera that takes pictures of people and shows what they will look like in the future, and travels back in time to ancient Japan on his time traveling machine called the Time Slipper. Senbei, Arale and Peasuke travel back in time to the prehistoric ages and end up bringing back an egg. When back to the present day, the egg hatches to a strange angel like baby which Arale names Gatchan; it joins the Norimaki household.
| 2 | Arale on the Loose; Totsugeki Arare-chan no Maki (とつげきアラレちゃんの巻) | October 9, 1980; 4-08-851182-4 | July 5, 2005; 978-1-59116-951-2 |
013. "Arale Flies the Skies!" (アラレ空をとぶ！の巻, Arare Sora o Tobu! no Maki); 014. "Arale on the Loose: Part 1" (とつげきアラレちゃんの巻Part1, Totsugeki Arare-chan no Maki Pāto Wan); 015. "Arale on the Loose: Part 2" (とつげきアラレちゃんの巻Part2, Totsugeki Arare-chan no Maki Pāto Tsū); 016. "The Invader from Space" (宇宙からの侵略者の巻, Uchū Kara no Shinryakusha no Maki); 017. "The Reality Machine" (ホンモノマシーンの巻, Honmono Mashīn no Maki); 018. "Kidnapped!?" (誘かいされた!?の巻, Yūkai Sareta!? no Maki); 019. "Teacher's Coming!" (先生がくるよ！の巻, Sensei ga Kuru yo! no Maki); 020. "The Ponpoko Morph Gun" (変身ポンポコガンの巻, Henshin Ponpoko Gan no Maki); 021. "A Far and Distant Seashore" (ムカシムカシの海水浴の巻, Mukashi Mukashi no Kaisuiyoku no Maki); 022. "Barber Shop Panic: Part 1" (パニックイン散髪屋の巻Part1, Panikku in Bābā no Maki Pāto Wan); 023. "Barber Shop Panic: Part 2" (パニックイン散髪屋の巻Part2, Panikku in Bābā no Maki Pāto Tsū); 024. "The Great Strawberry Panties Caper: Part 1" (イチゴパンツ大作戦の巻Part1, Ichigo Pantsu Daisakusen no Maki Pāto Wan); 025. "The Great Strawberry Panties Caper: Part 2" (イチゴパンツ大作戦の巻Part2, Ichigo Pantsu Daisakusen no Maki Pāto Tsū)
Arale and Taro ride in Senbei's new plane and crash onto the cloud of the Thunder Ogre Goronbo, who is in a hurry for a date. Arale and Akane get in trouble at school for drinking alcohol in class. Bubibinman, a rival of Suppaman, comes to Earth but then is frightened when he sees that Arale is powerful, making him assume all humans are like that. Akane and Arale are up to no good again when they mess with Senbei's new invention, a Living Rice Cooker named the Reality Machine that can create anything that is in a picture that was put inside of it. Arale and Gatchan are kidnapped by a bank robber who ends up being intimidated by Arale when he sees that bullets don't hurt her and Gatchan eats metal. Senbei hears that Arale's teacher is coming to their house, organizes the house in a hurry, and gets a rushed haircut that looks funny, only to find that Arale meant the principal. Senbei creates the Ponpoko Morph Gun which transforms anyone into anything. Arale and her friends use the Time Slipper to go to a beach in ancient Japan. The bank robber returns and holds Senbei, Arale and her friends hostage in the town barbershop with the police force getting involved. Senbei makes a plan, strategically placing animals to do things that will end up blowing Ms. Yamabuki's skirt up to see her underwear.
| 3 | Earth S.O.S.! Chikyū EsuŌEsu no Maki (地球SOS！の巻) | December 10, 1980; 4-08-851183-2 | September 6, 2005; 978-1-59116-991-8 |
026. "The Story of Donbe" (ドンベ物語の巻, Donbe Monogatari no Maki); 027. "Kids Gone Wild" (てけてけチルドレンの巻, Teke-teke Chirudoren no Maki); 028. "Ladycop Terror" (恐怖の婦警さんの巻, Kyōfu no Fukei-san no Maki); 029. "Earth S.O.S.!: Part 1" (地球SOS！の巻Part1, Chikyū Esu Ō Esu no Maki Pāto Wan); 030. "Earth S.O.S.!: Part 2" (地球SOS！の巻Part2, Chikyū Esu Ō Esu no Maki Pāto Tsū); 031. "Arale's Big Change" (アラレ大変身の巻, Arare Daihenshin no Maki); 032. "Hello, Wonder Island" (ハロー 不思議島の巻, Harō Fushigijima no Maki); 033. "The Ogre-King Gyaska" (ギャースカ大魔王の巻, Gyāsuka Daimaō no Maki); 034. "The Fairy Tale Machine" (おとぎマシーンの巻, Otogi Mashīn no Maki); 035. "Special: Scoundrel in a Skirt" (悪魔の変身スペシャル!!の巻, Akuma no Henshin Supesharu!! no Maki); 036. "Citizen Arale" (恐怖のよいこッコの巻, Kyōfu no Yoikokko no Maki); 037. "Our Hero, Suppaman" (英雄スッパマンの巻, Eiyū Suppaman no Maki); 038. "Arale Goes on an Errand" (おつかいアラレちゃんの巻, Otsukai Arare-chan no Maki)
Arale meets a shapeshifting fox named Donbe who tries to scare her and Kinoko, a preschooler who tries to make Arale hip. Senbei turns himself invisible to avoid a female police officer who has been harassing him. King Nikochan and his assistant attempt to destroy the Earth but Gatchan saves the day by eating their ship and stranding them on Earth. Senbei builds them a car, not knowing they are aliens. A Mole-Cricket accidentally gets stuck in Arale, causing her to act like a normal little girl instead of her weird self. Senbei discovers a video message from his father giving him the recipe for a special potion that makes people fall in love with him. He goes to Wonder Island to get the last ingredient to the potion, which was a tear from the Ogre-King Gyaska, but when the potion is finished Arale accidentally spills it on a tree. Senbei's new Fairy Tale machine brings Arale into the story of Momotaro the peach boy, which Arale ends up altering and brings Momotaro into the real world. Akane dresses up like her teacher Miss Yamabuki and plays a trick on Senbei making him do stupid things for her. Arale tries to be a good citizen by returning lost things to the police but then takes it too far and eventually brings everything to Penguin Village to the police station. Suppaman challenges Arale to see who's the better hero and Arale learns what a bra is.
| 4 | The Happy Doctor; Gokigen Sen-chan no Maki (ごきげんセンちゃんの巻) | April 10, 1981; 4-08-851184-0 | November 8, 2005; 978-1-4215-0165-9 |
039. "Bye-Bye Super Power!" (バイバイめっちゃんこパワー!!の巻, Baibai Mecchanko Pawā!! no Maki); 040. "The Lovely Trio" (ラブリーおっさんトリオの巻, Raburī Ossan Torio no Maki); 041. "Penguin Village S.O.S.: Part 1" (ペンギン村SOSの巻Part1, Pengin Mura Esu Ō Esu no Maki Pāto Wan); 042. "Penguin Village S.O.S.: Part 2" (ペンギン村SOSの巻Part2, Pengin Mura Esu Ō Esu no Maki Pāto Tsū); 043. "Gatchan Goes for a Walk" (おさんぽガッちゃんの巻, Osanpo Gacchan no Maki); 044. "Yay Yay Wildland" (わいわいワイルドランドの巻, Waiwai Wairudo Rando no Maki); 045. "The Happy Doctor" (ごきげんセンちゃんのの巻, Gokigen Sen-chan no Maki); 046. "Zippity-Doo Doctor" (はりきりセンちゃんの巻, Harikiri Sen-chan no Maki); 047. "The Dumbfounded Doctor" (おどろきセンちゃんの巻, Odoroki Sen-chan no Maki); 048. "A Bittersweet Ho-yo-yo Date Special!" (哀愁のほよよデートスペシャル!!の巻, Aishū no Hyoyoyo Dēto Supesharu!! no Maki); 049. "Parzan, King of the Jungle!" (ジャングルの王者パーザンの巻, Janguru no Ōja Pāzan no Maki); 050. "Sad, Sad Santa" (さんざんサンタさんの巻, Sanzan Santa-san no Maki); 051. "Special: "Kick the Can" (謝恩カンケリ大会の巻, Shaon Kankeri Taikai no Maki)
Senbei gets tired of Arale's Super Strength and tries to fix it to give her a normal girl's strength but instead accidentally makes her stronger. Akane plays a prank on her dad, Peasuke's Dad and Senbei by writing a fake letter from the school, causing them to show up the next day dressed "cute". Arale saves Penguin Village from being attacked by the monster Dodongadon when the Ulteeny Force member Kintaman fails to. Gatchan decides to cause mischief around town one morning. Arale and friends go to the zoo and she ends up becoming King of the Zoo. Senbei takes Midori on a date in space. Arale goes on a date with a gang leader from Kanariya high school. Arale meets Parzan who thinks he is the king of the jungle but lacks knowledge of animals. Christmas comes to Penguin Village and Senbei dresses as Santa Claus and sneaks into everybody's house giving them autographs of himself, which enrages the whole town. Akira Toriyama himself appears in Penguin Village and hosts a game of kick the can with the whole town and promises the winner any wish they want. Arale and Gatchan win the game and request to be made into adults but Toriyama doesn't want to do that so he breaks the fourth wall by erasing their sentence and replaces it with them asking for lollipops.
| 5 | Monsters' Night; Monsutāzu Naito no Maki (モンスターズ･ナイトの巻) | August 10, 1981; 4-08-851185-9 | January 3, 2006; 978-1-4215-0173-4 |
052. "Untouchable Arale" (アラレ・タッチャブルの巻, Arare Tacchaburu no Maki); 053. "Affairs of the Heart!" (ハートで勝負！の巻, Hāto de Shōbu no Maki); 054. "Monsters' Night" (モンスターズ･ナイトの巻, Monsutāzu Naito no Maki); 055. "The Great Arale-Eye Caper: Part 1" (アラレ目大作戦の巻Part1, Arare me Daisakusen no Maki Pāto Wan); 056. "The Great Arale-Eye Caper: Part 2" (アラレ目大作戦の巻Part2, Arare me Daisakusen no Maki Pāto Tsū); 057. "Kinoko on the Loose" (きのこ《放浪編》の巻, Kinoko Hōryū-hen no Maki); 058. "Heel, Achilles!" (博士のウイークポイントの巻, Hakase no Uīku Pointo no Maki); 059. "Good-bye, Gatchan!" (さようならガッちゃん!!の巻, Sayounara Gacchan!! no Maki); 060. "The Big-City Student" (都会島からの転校生の巻, Tokaijima Kara no Tenkōsei no Maki); 061. "Mr. Handy!" (作者もほしいオーチャくんの巻, Sakusha mo Hoshī Ōcha-kun no Maki); 062. "The Shiverman Cometh" (びびるマンの巻, Bibiruman no Maki); 063. "Peasuke's First Love" (はつこいぴいすけの巻, Hatsukoi Pīsuke no Maki)
The chapter "Untouchable Arale" is a short story of the main cast as police officers. Arale ends up having to take a health checkup at school and Senbei must make it so she can pass it without anyone having suspicion of her robotic origin. Trampire makes her debut as she tries to suck blood from Arale and rob the Norimaki house. Senbei has a camera put into Arale's eye and has her go to Midori's house so he can watch Midori in the bath. Kinoko runs away from home to try to be a bad kid but then realizes it is not the life for her. The Norimaki end up adopting a dog which Arale names Poop and returns it to its parents which end up being alien dogs. A smart kid from Metropolis Island named Skop moves into Penguin Village. Senbei creates a new robot called Mr. Handy. The bank robber hires a hitman named the Shiverman to take out Arale but is still no match for her. Peasuke gets a girlfriend named Hiyoko who is taller than he is so Arale ends up shrinking both him and Hiyoko to ant-size; Peasuke must then save Hiyoko from a bug.
| 6 | Dr. Mashirito's Ambition; Dokutā Mashirito no Yabō!! no Maki (Dr.マシリトの野望!!の巻) | December 10, 1981; 4-08-851186-7 | March 7, 2006; 978-1-4215-0174-1 |
064. "Riders at Dawn" (夜明けの暴走族の巻, Yoake no Bousouzoku no Maki); 065. "Little Cat Riding Hood" (ネコずきんちゃんの巻, Neko Zukin-chan no Maki); 066. "A Silent Night's Dream" (サイレント ナイト ドリームの巻, Sairento Naito Dorīmu no Maki); 067. "Dr. Mashirito's Ambition: Part 1" (Dr.マシリトの野望!!の巻Part1, Dokutā Mashirito no Yabō!! no Maki Pāto 1); 068. "Dr. Mashirito's Ambition: Part 2" (Dr.マシリトの野望!!の巻Part2, Dokutā Mashirito no Yabō!! no Maki Pāto 2); 069. "Heck's Messenger" (地獄の使者の巻, Jigoku no Messenjā no Maki); 070. "Suppaman 2" (スッパマン2の巻, Suppaman 2 no Maki); 071. "The Time Stoppers" (わくわくタイム・ストップの巻, Wakuwaku Taimu Sutoppu no Maki); 072. "Chivil's Work" (チビルくんのアルバイトの巻, Chibiru-kun no Arubaito no Maki); 073. "Metropolis Island: Part 1" (スーパーセンちゃんたちIN大都会島の巻Part1, Sūpāsen-chan-tachi in Daitokai Shima no Maki Pāto 1); 074. "Metropolis Island: Part 2" (スーパーセンちゃんたちIN大都会島の巻Part2, Sūpāsen-chan-tachi in Daitokai Shima no Maki Pāto 2); 075. "Kojiro is Waiting: Part 1" (コジローちゃんは まっていたの巻Part1, Kojirō-chan ha Matteita no Maki Pāto 1); 076. "Kojiro is Waiting: Part 2" (コジローちゃんは まっていたの巻Part2, Kojirō-chan ha Matteita no Maki Pāto 2)
Arale and Gatchan try to join the local biker gang known as the Fly Milks. "Little Cat Riding Hood" is a parody of the story of Little Red Riding Hood. Senbei tries to have a nice dream about him and Midori together but keeps getting interrupted when other people's dreams end up merging with his. The evil scientist Dr. Mashirito makes his debut where he creates Caramel Man 001 which he believes to be the most powerful robot but then loses to Arale. Arale meets and befriends the little demon Chivil. Arale messes around with Suppaman again. Toriyama makes a deal with Senbei to create a machine that can stop time but unfortunately it stops them as well. Chivil comes back to show a video of Senbei's sins. Senbei gets an invitation to appear on a TV show on Metropolis island about his scientific work. While he uses a robot copy of himself to appear on the show, Arale, Gatchan and Chivil cause havoc in the city of Metropolis Island. Arale and Taro use Mr. Time to go back to the Sengoku period where they meet Miyamoto Musashi. After losing to Arale at several challenges, the famous swordsmen decides to go to the present time with them and attend school at Penguin Village.
| 7 | My Toilet Paper; Boku no Toiretto Peipā no Maki (ぼくのといれっとぺーぱーの巻) | May 10, 1982; 4-08-851187-5 | May 2, 2006; 978-1-4215-0631-9 |
077. "Witchey Gone Wild!" (はちゃめちゃでびるぎゃるの巻, Hacha Mecha de Birugyaru no Maki); 078. "My Toilet Paper" (ぼくのといれっとぺいぱーの巻, Boku no Toiretto Peipā no Maki); 079. "Mr. Copy" (コピーくんの巻, Kopī-kun no Maki); 080. "Vacuum 1982" (バキュームIN'82の巻, Bakyūmu in 82 no Maki); 081. "Goo Ga Senbei" (ばぶばぶセンベエの巻, Babubabu Senbē no Maki); 082. "The Biggest Bye'cha of All: Part One" (地球最大のバイちゃ！の巻Part1, Chikyū Saidai no Bai-cha! no Maki Pāto 1); 083. "The Biggest Bye'cha of All: Part Two" (地球最大のバイちゃ！の巻Part2, Chikyū Saidai no Bai-cha! no Maki Pāto 2); 084. "Penguin Village Dom-Dom-Dom" (ドドドでペンギン村の巻, Dododo de Pengin Mura no Maki); 085. "Stone Age Ho-Yo-Yo" (原人ホヨヨ組の巻 Genjin Hoyoyo-gumi no Maki); 086. "Cinderella, The Musical" (MUSICALシンデレラの巻, Musical Shinderera no Maki); 087. "Spluk Spluk Phoo Phoo" (ぷすぷすはふはふの巻, Pusupusu Hafuhafu no Maki); 088. "Mammoth Midori: Part One" (マンモスみどりちゃんの巻Part1, Manmosu Midori-chan no Maki Pāto 1); 089. "Mammoth Midori: Part Two" (マンモスみどりちゃんの巻Part2, Manmosu Midori-chan no Maki Pāto 2); 090. "Am I Wicked Strong?!" (わたしって むちゃんこ つおい?の巻, Watashitte Muchanko Tsuoi? no Maki)
| 8 | Penguin Grand Prix; Pengin Guranpuri no Maki (ペンギン・グランプリの巻) | August 10, 1982; 4-08-851188-3 | July 5, 2006; 978-1-4215-0632-6 |
091. "The Ho-Yo-Yo Gang: Part 1" (怪盗ほよよ団の巻Part1, Kaitō Hoyoyo-dan no Maki Pāto 1); 092. "The Ho-Yo-Yo Gang: Part 2" (怪盗ほよよ団の巻Part2, Kaitō Hoyoyo-dan no Maki Pāto 2); 093. "Leave it to Akiko" (おまかせアキコさんの巻, Omakase Akiko-san no Maki); 094. "Penguin Grand Prix: Part 1" (ペンギン・グランプリの巻Part1, Pengin Guranpuri no Maki Pāto 1); 095. "Penguin Grand Prix: Part 2" (ペンギン・グランプリの巻Part2, Pengin Guranpuri no Maki Pāto 2); 096. "Penguin Grand Prix: Part 3" (ペンギン・グランプリの巻Part3, Pengin Guranpuri no Maki Pāto 3); 097. "Penguin Grand Prix: Part 4" (ペンギン・グランプリの巻Part4, Pengin Guranpuri no Maki Pāto 4); 098. "Discover the Countryside" (ディスカバー・いなか！の巻, Disukabā Inaka! no Maki); 099. "Super Drivero" (すうぱーどらいばーの巻, Sūpādoraibā no Maki); 100. "Our Little House" (みにちゅあ わが家の巻, Minichua Wagaya no Maki); 101. "Penguin Village Wars: Part 1" (ペンギン村ウオーズの巻Part1, Pengin Mura Uōzu no Maki Pāto 1); 102. "Penguin Village Wars: Part 2" (ペンギン村ウオーズの巻Part2, Pengin Mura Uōzu no Maki Pāto 2); 103. "Penguin Village Wars: Part 3" (ペンギン村ウオーズの巻Part3, Pengin Mura Uōzu no Maki Pāto 3)
| 9 | The Crazy Honeymoon; Kureijī Hanemūn no Maki (クレイジー・ハネムーンの巻) | December 23, 1982; 4-08-851189-1 | September 5, 2006; 978-1-4215-0633-3 |
104. "Today is Truly a Day for Celebration!" (本日はまことにおよろこびDAYの巻, Honjitsu ha Makoto ni Oyorokobi Day no Maki); 105. "The Crazy Honeymoon: Part 1" (クレイジー・ハネムーンの巻Part1, Kureijī Hanemūn no Maki Pāto 1); 106. "The Crazy Honeymoon: Part 2" (クレイジー・ハネムーンの巻Part2, Kureijī Hanemūn no Maki Pāto 2); 107. "The Crazy Honeymoon: Part 3" (クレイジー・ハネムーンの巻Part3, Kureijī Hanemūn no Maki Pāto 3); 108. "The Crazy Honeymoon: Part 4" (クレイジー・ハネムーンの巻Part4, Kureijī Hanemūn no Maki Pāto 4); 109. "The Crazy Honeymoon: Part 5" (クレイジー・ハネムーンの巻Part5, Kureijī Hanemūn no Maki Pāto 5); 110. "The Crazy Honeymoon: Part 6" (クレイジー・ハネムーンの巻Part6, Kureijī Hanemūn no Maki Pāto 6); 111. "Happy Honeymoon Drive" (わくわく新婚ライフの巻, Wakuwaku Shinkon Raifu no Maki); 112. "The Midnight Bombers" (夜空の鼓笛隊の巻, Yozora no Kotekitai no Maki); 113. "The Combots" (ザ･コンボットの巻, Za Konbotto no Maki); 114. "Something's Missing" (アラレちゃんのなくしたものの巻, Arare-chan no Nakushitamono no Maki); 115. "Yippee! High School!!" (うきうきハイ・スクール!!の巻, Ukiuki Hai Sukūru!! no Maki); 116. "Big-Head Cometh!" (でっかいアタマがやってきた!!の巻, Dekkai Atama ga Yattekita!! no Maki)
| 10 | Here Comes the Tsun; Tsun-san Ikka ga Yattekita no Maki (摘さん一家がやってきたの巻) | May 10, 1983; 4-08-851190-5 | November 7, 2006; 978-1-4215-0634-0 |
117. "Here Comes the Tsun" (摘さん一家がやってきたの巻, Tsun-san Ikka ga Yattekita no Maki); 118. "The Tsuns and the Norimakis" (則巻さん一家と摘さん一家の巻, Norimaki-san Ikka to Tsun-san Ikka no Maki); 119. "High School Champion: Part 1" (ハイスクール・チャンピヨンの巻Part1, Haisukūru Chanpiyon no Maki Pāto 1); 120. "High School Champion: Part 2" (ハイスクール・チャンピヨンの巻Part2, Haisukūru Chanpiyon no Maki Pāto 2); 121. "High School Champion: Part 3" (ハイスクール・チャンピヨンの巻Part3, Haisukūru Chanpiyon no Maki Pāto 3); 122. "High School Champion: Part 4" (ハイスクール・チャンピヨンの巻Part4, Haisukūru Chanpiyon no Maki Pāto 4); 123. "High School Champion: Part 5" (ハイスクール・チャンピヨンの巻Part5, Haisukūru Chanpiyon no Maki Pāto 5); 124. "High School Champion: Part 6" (ハイスクール・チャンピヨンの巻Part6, Haisukūru Chanpiyon no Maki Pāto 6); 125. "Suppaman and the Terror of Penguin Village" (スッパマンとペンギン村の怪の巻, Suppaman to Pengin Mura no Kai no Maki); 126. "Fly, Nikochan, Fly!" (フライング・ニコチャンの巻, Furaingu Niko-chan); 127. "The Horrors of Dating: Part 1" (オバケDEデートの巻Part1, Obake de Dēto no Maki Pāto 1); 128. "The Horrors of Dating: Part 2" (オバケDEデートの巻Part2, Obake de Dēto no Maki Pāto 2)
| 11 | Gatchan - Gatchan; Ga-chan Ga-chan no Maki (ガッちゃんガッちゃんの巻) | September 9, 1983; 4-08-851191-3 | January 2, 2007; 978-14215-0635-7 |
129. "The Lensmen" (レンズマンズの巻, Renzumanzu no Maki); 130. "Hell's Vegetables" (ベジタブルおじさんの巻, Bejitaburu Ojisan no Maki); 131. "He'll Be Comin' Down the Mountain" (じいちゃんが山からやってきたの巻, Jīchan ga Yama Kara Yattekita no Maki); 132. "He'll Be Goin' Up the Mountain" (じいちゃんが山へかえっていったの巻, Jīchan ga Yama he Kaette Itta no Maki); 133. "The Galactic Gumshoe: Part 1" (宇宙捕物帳の巻Part1, Uchū Torimono-chō no Maki Pāto 1); 134. "The Galactic Gumshoe: Part 2" (宇宙捕物帳の巻Part2, Uchū Torimono-chō no Maki Pāto 2); 135. "The Galactic Gumshoe: Part 3" (宇宙捕物帳の巻Part3, Uchū Torimono-chō no Maki Pāto 3); 136. "Hello Moon" (ハロー！お月さまの巻, Harō! Otsuki-sama no Maki); 137. "The Red Sandals" (赤い鼻緒の巻, Akai Hanao no Maki); 138. "Gatchan - Gatchan" (ガッちゃんガッちゃんの巻, Ga-chan Ga-chan no Maki); 139. "Crunch, Munch, Crunch, Munch" (ボリバリボリバリの巻, Boribari Boribari no Maki); 140. "A Gift from the Ground" (大地からの贈り物の巻, Daichi Kara no Okurimono no Maki)
| 12 | Go! Go! Nikochan! Go! Go! Niko-chan Sei no Maki (GO!GO!ニコチャン星の巻) | December 8, 1983; 4-08-851192-1 | May 1, 2007; 978-1-4215-1056-9 |
141. "Star Light, Star Bright" (ながれ星ねがい星の巻, Nagareboshi Negai Hoshi no Maki); 142. "There Go the Tsuns!" (さよなら摘さん一家の巻, Sayonara Tsun-san Ikka no Maki); 143. "Go! Go! Nikochan!" (GO!GO!ニコチャン星の巻, Go! Go! Niko-chan Sei no Maki); 144. "A Nikochan Reunion" (ニコチャン一家再会の巻, Niko-chan Ikka Saikai no Maki); 145. "The Horrible Truth about Radishes" (恐るべき大根の秘密の巻, Osorubeki Daikon no Himitsu no Maki); 146. "Hello, Deathmatch!" (必殺あいさつ合戦！の巻, Hissatsu Aisatsu Gassen! no Maki); 147. "The Thief Who Loved Books" (本が大好き泥棒さんの巻, Hon ga Daisuki Dorobōsan no Maki); 148. "Gangsters Welcome" (ヤクザ屋さんいらっしゃい！の巻, Yakuzaya-san Irasshai! no Maki); 149. "The Kon-Kon Helmet" (変身コンコンヘルメットの巻, Henshin Kon Kon Herumetto no Maki); 150. "N'cha, Penseal!" (んちゃ！ペンザラシくんの巻, Ncha! Penzarashi-kun no Maki); 151. "Yippee, Penseal!" (やた！ペンザラシくんの巻, Yata! Penzarashi-kun no Maki); 152. "A Very Painful Christmas" (いたいでーXマス！の巻, Itaide Kurisumasu! no Maki)
| 13 | I am Obotchaman; Watakushi Obotchaman Gozaimasu no Maki (わたくしオボッチャマンでございますの巻) | March 9, 1984; 4-08-851193-X | September 4, 2007; 978-1-4215-1057-6 |
153. "The Ultimate Rival!" (最強ライバル出現!!の巻, Saikyō Raibaru Shutsugen!! no Maki); 154. "From the Day Their Eyes Met" (ひと目あったその日から･･･の巻, Hitome Atta Sono hi Kara... no Maki); 155. "Justice, Love, and a Dilemma" (正義と愛の板ばさみ･･･の巻, Seigi to Ai no Itabasami... no Maki); 156. "The Warrior's Rest" (戦士の休息の巻, Senshi no Kyūsoku no Maki); 157. "Caramel Man 005!" (C.M.5号登場！の巻, Kyarameru Man 5-gō Tōjō! no Maki); 158. "Love is Telepathic (CM 004's Dream of Love: Part 1)" (C.M.4号の愛の夢シリーズ(1) - 愛のテレパシーの巻, Kyarameru Man 4-gō no Ai no Yume Shirīzu (1) - Ai no Terepashī no Maki); 159. "Run, Love, Run!" (走れ愛！の巻, Hashire Ai! no Maki); 160. "Hurry, Love, Hurry! (CM 004's Dream of Love: Part 2)" (O.M.愛の夢シリーズ(2) - 急げ愛！の巻, Obotchaman Ai no Yume Shirīzu (2) - Isoge Ai! no Maki); 161. "Thudda-Thudda Tonight (CM 004's Dream of Love: Part 3)" (O.M.愛の夢シリーズ(3) - ドキドキトゥナイトの巻, Obotchaman Ai no Yume Shirīzu (3) - Dokidoki Tounaito no Maki); 162. "Why, It's Entrance Exams! (CM 004's Dream of Love: Part 4)" (O.M.愛の夢シリーズ(4) - 入学テストでございます！の巻, Obotchaman Ai no Yume Shirīzu (4) - Nyūgaku Tesuto de Gozaimasu! no Maki); 163. "You Mean Arale's a... Too!?" (アラレさんも･･････なの??の巻, Arare-san mo...... na no?? no Maki); 164. "The Path to World Domination" (地球総支配者への道の巻, Chikyūsō Shihaisha e no Michi no Maki); 165. "Caramel Man 007!" (C.M.7号登場！の巻, Kyarameru Man 7-gō Tōjō! no Maki)
| 14 | The Indestructible Caramel Man 007! Muteki Kyarameru Man 7-gō no Maki (無敵C.M.7号の巻) | June 8, 1984; 4-08-851194-8 | January 1, 2008; 978-1-4215-1058-3 |
166. "The Indestructible Caramel Man 007!" (無敵C.M.7号の巻, Muteki Kyarameru Man 7-gō no Maki); 167. "Mashirito Almigthy!?" (マシリト野望達成??の巻, Mashirito Yabō Tassei?? no Maki); 168. "Gadzooks! Two Gatchans!?" (悪夢！ガジラがふたり･･･の巻, Akumu! Gajira ga Futari... no Maki); 169. "And I'll Form the Head!" (合体しちった！の巻, Gattaishichitta! no Maki); 170. "Three Days Before & Three Days After" (3日前&3日後の巻, Mi-ka Mae & Mi-ka Go no Naki); 171. "Poot Poot to the Skies!" (プププ！空をゆく!!の巻, Pupupu! Sora o Yuku!! no Maki); 172. "Way to Go, Gatchan!!!" (ガッちゃんえらいっ!!!の巻, Ga-chan Erai!!! no Maki); 173. "Rip Van Suppaman!" (すっぱまん太郎の巻, Suppaman Tarō no Maki); 174. "Enter Syoppman!" (弟しょっぱまん参上！の巻, Otōto Shoppaman Sanjō! no Maki); 175. "The Great Gator Escape!" (逮捕してちょ！の巻, Taihoshitecho! no Maki); 176. "Extreme Fitness" (猛烈シェイプアップ！の巻, Mōretsu Sheipuappu! no Maki); 177. "Congratulations, It's a-Huh!?" (おぎゃーはまだか？の巻, Ogyā ha Mada ka? no Maki); 178. "Special Picture-Book Section - Poop-Boy Finds a Home" (<お絵本スペシャル>うんちくんのマイホームの巻, "Oehon Supesharu" Unchi-kun no Maihōmu no Maki)
| 15 | Happy Birthday, Turbo! Tābo-kun Otanjō no Maki (ターボくんお誕生の巻) | October 9, 1984; 4-08-851195-6 | May 6, 2008; 978-1-4215-1059-0 |
179. "Happy Birthday, Turbo!" (ターボくんお誕生の巻, Tābo-kun Otanjō no Maki); 180. "Who's the E.T.?" (E.Tはだれ？の巻, E.T. ha Dare? no Maki); 181. "Who's Got E.S.P.?" (超能力者はだれ？の巻, Chōnōryokusha ha Dare? no Maki); 182. "Daddy's an Alien!" (おとうさんは宇宙人！の巻, Otōsan ha Uchūbito! no Maki); 183. "Terrifying Tag" (恐怖のオニゴッコの巻, Kyōfu no Onigokko no Maki); 184. "Onward, Turbo!" (直進！ターボくんの巻, Chokushin! Tābo-kun no Maki); 185. "We're Dreaming, Right?" (これは夢です!!の巻, Kore ha Yume Desu!! no Maki); 186. "Night on the Town" (あこがれのレストラン!!の巻, Akogare no Resutoran no Maki); 187. "The Late-Night Visitor" (真夜中にごめんくださいの巻, Mayonaka ni Gomenkudasai no Maki); 188. "Play Ball! (Part One)" (大高校野球大会＜その1＞の巻, Dai Kōkō Yakyū Taikai "Sono Ichi" no Maki); 189. "Play Ball! (Part Two)" (大高校野球大会＜その2＞の巻, Dai Kōkō Yakyū Taikai "Sono Ni" no Maki); 190. "Play Ball! (Part Three)" (大高校野球大会＜その3＞の巻, Dai Kōkō Yakyū Taikai "Sono San" no Maki); 191. "Play Ball! (Part Four)" (大高校野球大会＜その4＞の巻, Dai Kōkō Yakyū Taikai "Sono Yon" no Maki)
| 16 | Who's the Strongest in the World; Sekai Hitotsu oi no Dāre da Taikai!! no Maki (世界一つおいのだーれだ大会!!の巻) | January 10, 1985; 4-08-851196-4 | September 2, 2008; 978-1-4215-1060-6 |
192. "Questions that Demand Answers" (？おこたえしましょスペシャル？, ?Okotae Shimasho Supesharu?); 193. "Coffee, Tea, or Me?" (ときめきティールームの巻, Tokimeki Tīrūmu); 194. "Divorce!" (離婚します！の巻, Rikonshimasu! no Maki); 195. "N'cha, Enma!" (んちゃ！閻魔大王の巻, Ncha! Enma Daiō no Maki); 196. "The Terrifying Fly Guy: Part 1" (恐怖のハエ人間＜その1＞の巻, Kyōfu no Hae Ningen "Sono Ichi" no Maki); 197. "The Terrifying Fly Guy: Part 2" (恐怖のハエ人間＜その2＞の巻, Kyōfu no Hae Ningen "Sono Ni" no Maki); 198. "The Terrifying Fly Guy: Part 3" (恐怖のハエ人間＜その3＞の巻, Kyōfu no Hae Ningen "Sono San" no Maki); 199. "Future Love" (愛は未来で確かめて･･･の巻, Ai ha Mirai de Tashikamete... no Maki); 200. "N'cha, Penguin Village Ten Years from Now!" (んちゃ！10年後のペンギン村の巻, Ncha! 10-Nengo no Pengin Mura no Maki); 201. "A Gift from Mashirito" (マシリトからの贈り物の巻, Mashirito Kara no Okurimono no Maki); 202. "Who's the Strongest in the World?: Part 1" (世界一つおいのだーれだ大会!!＜その1＞の巻, Sekai Hitotsu oi no Dāre da Taikai!! "Sono Ichi" no Maki); 203. "Who's the Strongest in the World?: Part 2" (世界一つおいのだーれだ大会!!＜その2＞の巻, Sekai Hitotsu oi no Dāre da Taikai!! "Sono Ni" no Maki); 204. "Who's the Strongest in the World?: Part 3" (世界一つおいのだーれだ大会!!＜その3＞の巻, Sekai Hitotsu oi no Dāre da Taikai!! "Sono San" no Maki); 205. "Who's the Strongest in the World?: Part 4" (世界一つおいのだーれだ大会!!＜その4＞の巻, Sekai Hitotsu oi no Dāre da Taikai!! "Sono Yon" no Maki)
| 17 | God Gets Even! Kamisama no Dai Gyakushū!! no Maki (神様の大逆集!!の巻) | March 8, 1985; 4-08-851197-2 | January 6, 2009; 978-1-4215-1999-9 |
206. "The Gatchans, Exposed!" (ガッちゃんの正体!!の巻, Gacchan no Shōtai!! no Maki); 207. "God Gets Even!" (神様の大逆集!!の巻, Kamisama no Dai Gyakushū no Maki); 208. "The Laughter of Angels" (天使たちの笑いの巻, Tenshi Tachi no Warai no Maki); 209. "Torahachiro's Birdy" (虎八郎さんの文鳥の巻, Torahachirō-san no Bunchō no Maki); 210. "I'll Tame Em' All!" (みんなちょうだい！の巻, Minna Chōdai! no Maki); 211. "Sweet Revenge" (復讐のドドンパ!!の巻, Fukushū no Dodonpa!! no Maki); 212. "The T.S.W." (T.S.W（タイムストップウオッチ）の巻, T.S.W. (Taimu Sutoppu Uocchi) no Maki); 213. "Stop Stopping It" (とめすぎちゃって困るの･･･の巻, Tomesugichatte Komaru no... no Maki); 214. "Unidentified Flying Object" (謎の飛行物体の巻, Nazo no Hikō Buttai no Maki); 215. "The Adventures of Youth (Part 1)" (駆けずり回る青春の巻Part1, Kakezurimawaru Seishun no Maki Pāto 1); 216. "The Adventures of Youth (Part 2)" (駆けずり回る青春の巻Part2, Kakezurimawaru Seishun no Maki Pāto 2); 217. "The Adventures of Youth (Part 3)" (駆けずり回る青春の巻Part3, Kakezurimawaru Seishun no Maki Pāto 3); 218. "The Adventures of Youth (Part 4)" (駆けずり回る青春の巻Part4, Kakezurimawaru Seishun no Maki Pāto 4); 219. "The Adventures of Youth (Part 5)" (駆けずり回る青春の巻Part5, Kakezurimawaru Seishun no Maki Pāto 5); 220. "The Adventures of Youth (Part 6)" (駆けずり回る青春の巻Part6, Kakezurimawaru Seishun no Maki Pāto 6)
| 18 | Grand Finale! Invention Explosion! Saishūkai yō Meka Dai Hatsumei! no Maki (最終回用メカ大発明！の巻) | May 10, 1985; 4-08-851198-0 | May 5, 2009; 978-1-4215-2000-1 |
221. "Go, Go, Tanuki!" (がんばれタヌキくん！の巻, Ganbare Tanuki-kun! no Maki); 222. "King Kong" (キングコング登場！の巻, Kingu Kongu Tōjō! no Maki); 223. "Whoa! We're Serious!" (うっかり高校三年生の巻, Ukkari Kōkō-san Nensei no Maki); 224. "Passed!" (話；合格！の巻, Hanashi; Gōkaku! no Maki); 225. "Youth on Wheels" (疾走する青春！の巻, Shissō Suru Seishun! no Maki); 226. "The Return of Biker Boy" (帰ってきたオートバイこぞうの巻, Kaettekita Ōtobai Kozō no Maki); 227. "Love on the Asphalt" (アスファルトにかける恋！の巻, Asufaruto ni Kakeru Koi! no Maki); 228. "Peace!" (平和なり！の巻, Heiwa Nari! no Maki); 229. "You're Under Arrest!" (逮捕する！の巻, Taiho Suru! no Maki); 230. "2nd Annual Penguin Village Grand Prix, Scene 1" (第二回ペンギングランプリSCENE1の巻, Dai ni Kai Pengin Guran Puri Scene 1 no Maki); 231. "Ten Contestants" (10人の戦士！の巻, 10 Nin no Senshi! no Maki); 232. "Full Speed to the Finish!" (ラストへ向け全力疾走!!!の巻, Rasuto e Muke Zenryoku Shissō!!! no Maki); 233. "The Final Hurdle" (最後の難関！の巻, Saigo no Nankan! no Maki); 234. "The Goal is in Sight" (ゴールまであと･･･の巻, Gōru Made Ato... no Maki); 235. "A New Mayor" (新村長誕生！の巻, Shin Sonchō Tanjō! no Maki); 236. "Grand Finale! Invention Explosion!" (最終回用メカ大発明！の巻, Saishūkai yō Meka Dai Hatsumei! no Maki)
