= Kazuhiko Torishima =

Japanese publishing executive and manga editor (born 1952)

- 鳥嶋 和彦
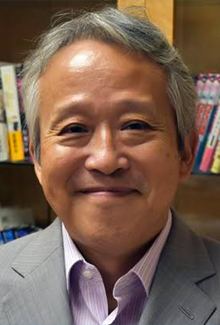
- Torishima in 2016
- Born: October 19, 1952 (age 74); Ojiya, Niigata, Japan
- Education: Keio University
- Years active: 1976–present
- Known for: Shueisha manga magazine editing
- Title: Outside director at Bushiroad

Kazuhiko Torishima (Japanese: 鳥嶋 和彦, Hepburn: Torishima Kazuhiko; born October 19, 1952) is a Japanese publishing executive and former manga magazine editor, who is currently serving as an outside director at Bushiroad. He formerly worked at Shueisha, where he began as an editor in 1976, before becoming a senior managing director (CEO), and later a Shogakukan-Shueisha Productions director. When he moved to Hakusensha in 2015, he first served as president, then representative director, before taking on the role of advisor. He began working for Bushiroad at the end of 2022.

Torishima has been called one of the most important figures in the history of manga, and has been credited with pioneering the media mix business strategy. He is often associated with works from the manga magazine Weekly Shōnen Jump, for which he was editor-in-chief from 1996 to 2001. Torishima discovered Akira Toriyama and was his editor throughout the run of Dr. Slump (1980–1984) and during the first half of Dragon Ball (1984–1995). He received a Special Achievement Award at the 2022 Japan Media Arts Festival for his work in manga.

== Early life ==
Kazuhiko Torishima was born in the small community of Ojiya, Niigata on October 19, 1952. He described his mother as very positive, but said he did not have a good relationship with his father. Torishima has repeatedly spoken of his dislike for his hometown, which he described as a "stifling" place where nothing changes, and its residents, who he feels are "incredibly complicated" to deal with. Because they had nothing in common to talk about, he had no friends and spent his youth alone reading books; "when you don't have the financial background to escape that kind of community, your only option is read a lot of books. As they allow you to escape into a different world. So reading a lot helped me to survive". While still in elementary school, he would read a lot of Confucius, Friedrich Nietzsche and Blaise Pascal. In middle school, he tried to read one book a day by going to multiple libraries every day, reading anything that caught his interest. When he had enough of philosophers writing different and contradictory things, Torishima switched to erotic novels such as Story of the Eye and Story of O. Torishima said that because he could not get into a university, he moved to Tokyo to enter a college-preparatory school, where he was liberated having found people that were smarter than himself and who shared his interests. He went on to attend Keio University, which he chose because its tuition was cheap, against his father's wishes because he thought it would be the best way to achieve financial independence. Although he wanted to major in French literature in their Faculty of Letters, he chose the Faculty of Law because of its employability and because his parents refused to pay tuition for anything else. He later stated that the people he met at Keio became lifelong friends.

== Career ==
=== Manga editing career (1976–1992) ===
As a bibliophile, Torishima believed the only career prospects he had were either as a writer or an editor. He chose the latter because he said he lacked almost all the skills needed for the former. Torishima wanted to work at Bungeishunjū, but they were one of many publishing companies not hiring due to the recession from the 1973 oil crisis. He claims to have applied to 48 companies across various industries and to have only heard back from two, a mid-level life insurance company and Shueisha. Torishima joined Shueisha in 1976, the year he graduated. He wanted to work on Monthly Playboy because of their high-quality short stories and novellas by famous authors, both domestic and foreign. However, he was assigned as an editor at Weekly Shōnen Jump, despite having never really had any contact with manga until Shueisha sent him their products for reference. He said he considered quitting after only a week. Torishima was put in charge of Buronson and Shinji Hiramatsu's Doberman Deka. After this series jumped from around seventeenth in the reader rankings to third and going to the Shogakukan archives to study classic manga, he finally became interested in his job. Preferring shōjo manga such as Kaze to Ki no Uta and Poe no Ichizoku, Torishima felt that Jump manga at the time "had no intelligence or depth" and decided to help foster manga he found interesting to rank high with readers. He also studied the first chapter of Ore wa Teppei panel by panel and the layout and angles in each one, because he felt it was the easiest manga to read and tried to impart this basic structure to his artists.

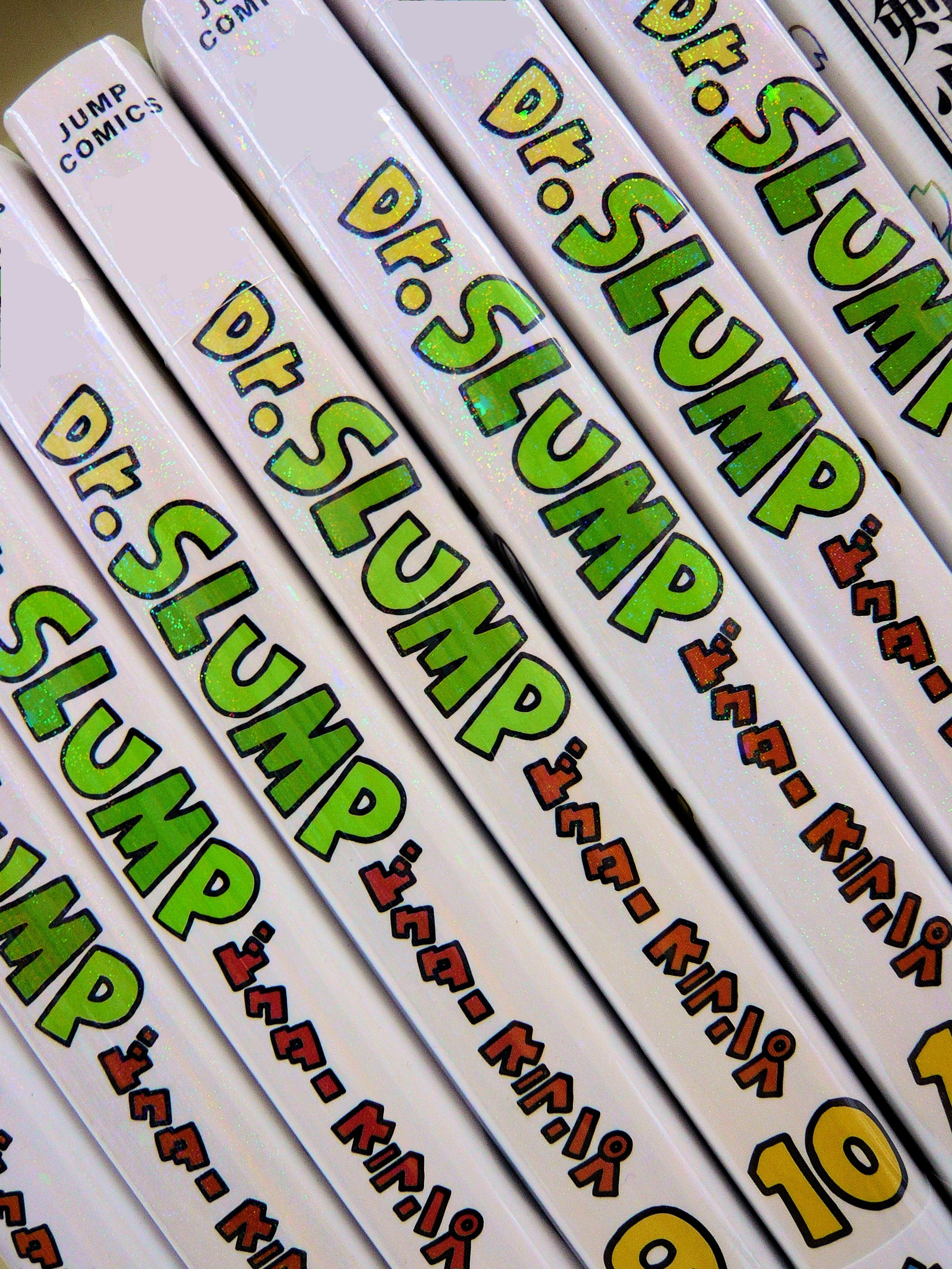
Kanzenban edition of Dr. Slump, published by Shueisha

Torishima was most notably editor to Akira Toriyama throughout Dr. Slump (1980–1984) and for the first half of Dragon Ball (1984–1995). The two began working together after Torishima read a work Toriyama submitted for Weekly Shōnen Jump's Newcomer Award. He thought it was beautiful and funny, but it was ineligible to compete because it was a parody, so Torishima sent the artist a telegram and encouraged him to keep drawing and sending him manga. This resulted in Wonder Island, which became Toriyama's first published work when it appeared in Weekly Shōnen Jump in 1978. However, it took 18 months, with Torishima rejecting 500 pages of work, until Toriyama began his first serialized work in Dr. Slump. It was an immediate success, ranking second in the reader rankings. Despite its success of regularly selling one million copies and having an anime adaptation that was about to debut, Toriyama wanted to end the manga after only six months. The magazine's chief editor told them that if they could come up with something more interesting and successful then they could end Dr. Slump. The two worked on numerous one-shots until Torishima suggested Toriyama make a manga based on the kung fu films he enjoyed so much. This became Dragon Boy, which was very well-received and developed into the serial Dragon Ball. Dragon Ball began as an adventure/gag manga but later turned into a martial arts fighting series, considered by many to be the "most influential shōnen manga". It was one of the main reasons for Weekly Shōnen Jump's circulation hitting a record high of 6.53 million copies (1995), and became Shueisha's second best-selling manga series of all time.

Ryuji Kayama of Bunshun Online and Taro Kawashima of AERA dot. both wrote that the now-commonplace media mix production method was triggered by the success of the Dr. Slump anime adaptation. However, Torishima felt the anime was unsuccessful because it greatly deviated from the original manga. He believed the reason for its deficiency was due to no one at Weekly Shōnen Jump knowing how to manage an anime adaptation based on one of their manga as this was "the first real time" it had been done. (Note: The last anime adaptation of a Weekly Shōnen Jump manga was Samurai Giants, seven and a half years earlier.) He has also said that a lot of "terrible" merchandise was released under the Dr. Slump name without prior consultation. Therefore, he decided to study both the creative and business sides to anime creation. This included talking to the team for Doraemon at Shogakukan. When it came time to adapt Dragon Ball, he and the Jump team had a huge "bible" created for the series before production even started on the anime, and were much more hands on. Merchandise could not be released without his approval, a system was created to control the products being released each season so as not to flood the market, and these products were introduced in Jump. When he felt the Dragon Ball anime's ratings were gradually declining, Torishima went so far as to ask the studio to change the producer because he had a "cute and funny" image connected to Toriyama's work due to previously working on Dr. Slump, and was missing the more serious tone of the new work. Impressed with their work on the Saint Seiya anime, he asked its director Kōzō Morishita and writer Takao Koyama to help "reboot" Dragon Ball; which coincided with the beginning of its second anime adaptation, Dragon Ball Z.

Torishima also discovered Masakazu Katsura, and worked as his editor on Wing-Man (1983–1985) and Video Girl Ai (1989–1992). He cited Makoto Isshiki as the most difficult manga artist he has worked worth, explaining that she wanted to end Hanattare Boogie (1986) as soon as he told her it had been approved for serialization.

=== Video games and V Jump (1982–1996) ===
Torishima became a fan of video games around 1977, and prefers them over manga. "Manga is something you read once and then it's over, but games have a learning effect. If you hit a wall once, you can learn and analyze 'why you failed', and try again, and you can move forward." He would often visit a store in Shinjuku that had playtests for new games with his friend Akira Sakuma, a writer who worked for Seventeen and whom Torishima met after he asked to interview Toriyama for Weekly Playboy. Sakuma eventually introduced him to fellow writer Yuji Horii, who joined their gaming group.

Because they were short on staff, Torishima was made editor of Weekly Shōnen Jump's reader submissions page in 1982. He agreed on the condition that Sakuma, who later created the Momotaro Dentetsu video game series, be put in charge of it. They increased the page count from four to eight, and hired illustrator Doi Takayuki (who also worked on Momotaro Dentetsu). This was the creation of the magazine's Jump Broadcasting Station (ジャンプ放送局, Janpu Hōsō Kyoku), which ran until 1995. The column reached tenth in the readers survey, surpassing half of the manga series. Torishima also brought Horii into the Jump fold to write articles about video games. Torishima's colleagues were against his bringing of outsiders into the company, for reasons such as worrying about the survey results being leaked. Thus, they had to work in a conference room and were not allowed inside the editorial department. Also in 1982, Weekly Shōnen Jump was approached by Yukinobu Chida of Enix to sponsor their "Game Hobby Program Contest", which offered a cash prize for video game prototypes. Torishima agreed as long as Jump was the exclusive magazine sponsor, and assigned Horii to cover the event. Horii secretly also entered the contest and took home an honorable mention.

When his manager told him to figure out why Shogakukan's CoroCoro Comic was doing so well, Torishima determined it was because of the sealed pages that had to be cut open to reveal cheats and tips for video games. So Jump began doing the same with Horii and also began to rate games, something new at the time. This was the birth of Famicom Shinken (ファミコン神拳), the irregularly published video game section of Weekly Shōnen Jump from 1985 to 1988. Its title was derived from the Family Computer gaming system, which is abbreviated to "Famicom", and Hokuto Shinken, a martial art from Jump's own Fist of the North Star. Horii had the idea to use a rating system based on a famous onomatopoeia from the same manga. The column was a hit that reached third in the magazine's readers poll and led to non-stop phone calls about the games, forcing Torishima to pay Horii and Hiroshi Miyaoka just to answer the phones.

When Horii decided to team up with his fellow Enix Game Hobby Program Contest competitor Koichi Nakamura to create a video game, Torishima was involved in the early discussions where it was determined it would be a role-playing game that combined the best parts of Wizardry and Ultima, which their gaming group was fans of. With Jump's game coverage struggling against Family Computer Magazine and Famitsu, he came up with the idea of showing their readers how a video game is developed. In order to justify coverage in the magazine and draw more attention to it, he decided to have Toriyama design the characters for this new game. Because they were still creating the game while Jump was covering it, the developers were able to incorporate feedback from readers. Torishima claimed that he purposefully had Enix fully fund the game, intentionally keeping Shueisha out of the decision making process not only for the good of the product, but also because it would have cut into Toriyama's share of the profits. Instead, Shueisha published guidebooks and strategy guides to the game, and reserved the option to create a manga based on it without having to pay any royalties. The resulting video game was Dragon Quest (1986). Around 1989, Torishima was promoted to deputy editor of Weekly Shōnen Jump. While waiting for the release of Dragon Quest IV, he began working on Dragon Quest: The Adventure of Dai with Riku Sanjo and Koji Inada. Torishima had Horii supervise the manga to make sure it did not feel out of place in the Dragon Quest world.

V Jump logo

In the early 1990s, Shueisha directed Torishima to create V Jump as a children's magazine to compete with CoroCoro Comic. Believing Shueisha was incapable of this because they lacked the experience and personal connections Shogakukan had, Torishima claims to have purposefully chosen a theme he knew would be unpopular for its third issue. He then received permission to re-launch the magazine with the new goal of containing manga, anime, and video game content all in one medium. Torishima later claimed to have predicted people being able to access all of these in one place like smartphones, and wanted to "get off the sinking ship" that was print manga magazines as soon as possible. He also wanted to begin promoting games while they were still in development, and personally went around to major game studios and asked them to publicize the names and faces of the individual creators. Torishima left Weekly Shōnen Jump to re-launch V Jump in 1992, and serve as its editor-in-chief. He also changed the meaning of the "V" in its title from "Victory", derived from the V sign, to "Virtual".

Torishima was approached by Hironobu Sakaguchi to include coverage of Final Fantasy IV (1991) in Jump. Although he had to decline and even criticized Sakaguchi's video game franchise, the two became drinking buddies. Sakaguchi had the idea to combine the best aspects of Final Fantasy and Dragon Quest. Mecha were added to a world of swords and magic, and Square proposed a time slip element. Feeling that Enix was indulging Horii too much by allowing him to only work on Dragon Quest entries instead of new works that could revitalize the game industry, Torishima proposed Sakaguchi, Horii and Toriyama team up for Chrono Trigger (1995). Unusually, Toriyama drew illustrations of key scenes first so they could be used for promotion, and Square created the game to match them. Torishima stated that he tricked the Jump editorial department in regards to Chrono Trigger; after the first publication in Weekly Shōnen Jump, coverage of the game was mainly done in V Jump in order to give the newly-launching magazine attention.

=== Editor-in-chief and executive career (1996–present) ===
After three months of refusing the position, Torishima finally agreed to leave V Jump and become the sixth editor-in-chief of Weekly Shōnen Jump in February 1996 during declining sales. He cited the 1995 end of Dragon Ball as the biggest reason for the rapid fall, explaining that, when a long-running hit series ends, the regular readers tend to leave. "The readers knew that no new manga had been coming out for several years, but only the editorial department and Shueisha did not." He later said they were only concerned with securing immediate profits, and "foolishly" thought circulation would go back up if they brought him back, without any regard for the future. Torishima's plan was to return to the magazine's roots which its first editor-in-chief had set; new serializations by new authors, working together with editors to create, and reader surveys. The first thing he did was cancel any plans his predecessor had made, this included scuttling a manga based on a work by Miyuki Miyabe. He also cut all of the veteran artists and increased the competitive principle amongst the editors by giving them more freedom, but firing any who failed to produce hit series. In regard to the reader surveys, he explained that it is not simply which manga ranked highest, because they only apply to a specific point in time. Instead, the editors prepare a hypothesis, ask questions, and use it to gather data on readers a "half step into the future." He also explained to the company that increasing royalties by having its manga made into anime, video games, and other merchandise made more sense than increasing circulation, and was also easier. Under Torishima's leadership, blockbuster series such as Yu-Gi-Oh!, One Piece, Hunter × Hunter and Naruto were launched, as was the annual Jump Festa event. Additionally, The Prince of Tennis and Hikaru no Go created social phenomena by popularizing tennis and Go amongst children. According to sociologist Atsuo Nakayama, a change to the Weekly Shōnen Jump readership also occurred due to new works such as Hoshin Engi and The Prince of Tennis targeting women. Torishima was the magazine's editor-in-chief until June 2001.

In August 2004, he became a member of the board of directors at Shueisha and was appointed full-time Director of Business. He served during the establishment of Shogakukan-Shueisha Productions in 2008. Torishima became a managing director (CEO) at Shueisha in August 2009 and promoted to Senior Managing Director in August 2010. In December 2010, he spoke at the New Manga Creators Awards in response to the Tokyo Metropolitan Ordinance Regarding the Healthy Development of Youths's controversial passing of the industry opposed Bill 156. There he challenged new manga artists to "produce manga that would blow away [Tokyo Governor] Shintaro Ishihara." In an interview with Ollie Barder of Forbes, Torishima explained his opposition. Firstly, he did not like that a political body was trying to decide creative expression. Secondly, because the restrictions would only apply to manga and anime, he viewed the bill as discriminating against those specific mediums while ignoring content from films or novels; noting how Ishihara was formerly a novelist himself.

Torishima retired from Shueisha in August 2015 and became president of Hakusensha in November 2015. The first thing he did was personally meet with every single employee for at least half an hour. His term as president was set for two and a half years. He was a member of the Tokyo Organising Committee of the Olympic and Paralympic Games' Mascot Selection Panel, who determined the process for choosing the mascots of the 2020 Summer Olympics. The panel decided to allow children a hand in the selection of the mascot for the first time at an Olympic Games. Torishima said, "Kids' minds work differently from adults'. As a member of the panel, I like to think my job is to help bridge that gap." In November 2018, Torishima was promoted to Representative Director at Hakusensha. In 2021, Torishima began Dr. Mashirito's Ultimate Manga Techniques (Dr.マシリト 最強漫画術, Dokutā Mashirito Saikyō Manga Jutsu) in Saikyō Jump. It teaches how to become a manga artist, including practical techniques, how to submit manuscripts to publishers, and how to work with editors. It was collected into a book published by Shueisha on July 21, 2023, that includes interviews with Toriyama, Katsura and Inada. It was published in English by Viz Media on May 13, 2025. From 2021 to 2022, Torishima was an advisor to Hakusensha. Also in 2022, he was a special judge of Comico's Tate Color Manga Awards. On December 31, 2022, Torishima was approved as an outside director at Bushiroad. Torishima has co-hosted the Yūbō & Mashirito no KosoKoso Hōsōkyoku (ゆう坊&マシリトのKosoKoso放送局) segment of the Tokyo M.A.A.D Spin radio program on J-Wave with Horii since July 31, 2023. Rejected: Shōnen Jump's Legendary Editor-in-chief's "Unpleasant" Work Techniques (ボツ 『少年ジャンプ』伝説の編集長の“嫌われる”仕事術, Botsu "Shōnen Janpu" Densetsu no Henshū-chō no "Kirawareru" Shigoto-jutsu), Torishima's book recounting stories about notable titles he worked on in his career, was published on May 22, 2025. Torishima gave three lectures at the 2025 Japan Expo in Paris; two with animator Katsuyoshi Nakatsuru and one with manga artist Toyotarou, both of whom worked on the Dragon Ball franchise.

== Philosophy ==
Manga is basically about starting a new series with a new author, ending it if it doesn't work, and repeating this cycle as quickly as possible to look for the seeds of a hit. That's all there is to it.

— Kazuhiko Torishima, 2019

Torishima described an editor as having three main roles. The first is that of a "director" and refers to their judging of a manga name or storyboard created by an artist. The second is to act as a "manager" and manage the artist's health, handle tax procedures, arrange assistants and housing, etc. The third and most important role, as well as the most difficult, is that of a "producer". Because the artist will exhaust themselves by concentrating only on their current work, an editor must make sure they do not wither away by providing input on a daily basis and keeping an eye on their next work, developing the creator over the span of three to five years. Torishima stated that editors in charge of hit manga are the most important people at a manga magazine. He called an editor-in-chief's opinion on manga "basically irrelevant" because they are motivated by the response from readers. So if there is a good response, the editor-in-chief can not say no. "The people who produce results on the front lines are the most important." He further opined, if you hire 10 editors, only two need to be any good because just one of them can then develop 10 authors. Influenced by Hironobu Sakaguchi, Torishima gave his editors much freedom. He simply required that they contact him once a day, as he was able to tell if they were doing their job properly by looking at the manga manuscripts they turned in. Torishima stated that editors do not need to be liked and are not friends with the manga artists. They must give their honest opinion, even if it is difficult to say. However, he also told his staff to always side with their artists if the editorial department's opinion conflicts with the author's.

Torishima said he could only deal with up to five manga artists at one time. He said his meetings about manga were only around 30 minutes long and he would only read a storyboard twice; the first time to get everything in his head, and the second time to explain what needed to be changed. He aimed to get new authors serialized within three years, preferably between two and three. After about six months of meetings, he could see if they were getting better and how well he would be able to work with them. If he felt it would be too difficult, he would tell them to go elsewhere. He stated an important part of being an editor is to have a lot of different conversations with the authors to discover their potential points of interest; "Artists really open up and talk when it's not their own work they're dissecting." So he would take manga creators to see movies, ask their opinions on other people's manga and anime, and take notes for future reference. Torishima believes it is best for editors to not read too much manga, as an editor who loves manga will force their own preferences on the artists.

Through the trials and errors he went through with Toriyama leading up to the creation of Dr. Slump, Torishima said he inadvertently developed something akin to a training method for new artists. He believes manga can be either easy or hard to read, and that this readability is determined by panel layouts and their perspectives. He would read a manga 50 times, researching and analyzing where each and every panel should go, so that he could then explain this to the artists. Torishima explained, "The speech balloons in manga can fit about three, seven-character-long lines of colloquial Japanese, and these are exchanged back and forth via dialogue between characters. The reader 'sees' rather than 'reads' because that conversation is unfolding along with the pictures. So it should be something that can be read at a considerable speed." He said every artist improved significantly after they understood page structure. Between panels, dialogue, and pictures, Torishima believes pictures are the least important in manga. In 2022, Torishima said some modern manga, where the story progresses through dialogue between characters, felt a bit unnatural because they had too much talking.

Torishima said every new artist has something they desperately want to depict, but these often end up as copies of series that they like and you can not make a hit out of an imitation. He explained, the only way to realize their originality is through trial and error, writing and drawing like Toriyama and his 500 failed manuscripts. "A little soul-searching can lead to a big hit." He believes that the manga that become big hits are those that resonate with children. "In the West, manga is something that adults give to children, but in Japan it is something that children choose for themselves. And the manga that you read when you are young stays in your mind even when you grow up." Because manga artists are adults, Torishima said it is up to the editor to act as a bridge between them and children. When asked why Weekly Shōnen Jump manga should target elementary- and middle school-aged children instead of high school students who are more likely to have money, he explained that the latter have various ways to vent their frustrations, such as going out or pursuing romance, but the only way young children can "find salvation" is in the two-dimensional world. Therefore, "High school students will drift away. Children will stick around." He said it is easier for new writers to create a hit because their sensibilities are closer to the readers. He also explained that while they have less ability to compose, their manuscript fees are cheaper when compared to veteran artists. Torishima would stress creating attractive characters to new artists and his junior editors, because he believes what is important is not the story or setting, but 'who' the chapter is about. A person's level of interest will be completely different depending on who the story is about. "If it's about someone you like, even the most trivial thing will be an important story." In 2024, Torishima criticized the current editors of Weekly Shōnen Jump as "no good" and their manga as "excessive". He explained the settings are too elaborate, and it is the editors' jobs to cut this down, but they are unable to do so.

With the advent of digital manga distribution, Torishima has said that magazines and major publishers are "finished", but manga itself has the ability to transform. The traditional business model has been to use magazines to promote manga, then sell the manga in tankōbon, which makes up for the financial losses of the magazine. He explained that major publishers are reluctant to shift to digital distribution because it cuts out the printing companies, distribution companies, and bookstores, and they are using manga sales to cover other loss-making divisions instead of putting it back into the manga industry. However, he stated the print industry still has higher-quality works because most digital manga has the same problem as doujinshi; it is whatever the author wants to draw and lacks the quality-check provided by an editor. Torishima believes the only way forward is for editors to take on more responsibilities and be hired as free agents by publishing houses, who will pay more to those who produce hits and release those who do not. Another issue Torishima sees with digital distribution is that while famous titles and those created by well-known authors are easy to find and sell well, new works by new artists do not get noticed. One of the features of print magazines is that you can discover things you did not know about. He also pointed out that the shift to digital sees manga having to now compete against anime and video games for screen time.

== Influence on fiction ==
Hotate Inaba of Denfaminico Gamer called Torishima one of the most important figures in the history of manga. His colleague Seinosuke Ito credited Torishima with pioneering the media mix business strategy. Torishima received a Special Achievement Award at the 2022 Japan Media Arts Festival for his work in manga, including the discovering of Akira Toriyama and establishing the now "indispensable cross-media production method". Torishima claimed that when he became a deputy editor at Weekly Shōnen Jump he created teaching materials for how editors should help their manga artists that are still used as of 2016. Although he is sometimes viewed as an editor who forced authors to make romantic comedies, he said this is because there was a certain trend at the time and it is what the readers wanted.

As a rookie editor, Torishima was put in charge of Doberman Deka, which had already been chosen to end in a few months due to low rankings in the reader surveys. Believing that its artist Shinji Hiramatsu was good at action but bad at drawing women, Torishima gave him an issue of the actor and idol magazine Myojo and told him to model the face of a new policewoman character after that of the most popular idol at the time, Ikue Sakakibara. After which, Doberman Deka jumped from around seventeenth in the reader rankings to third, and made Torishima finally interested in his job.

Torishima convinced Toriyama to make Arale the main character of Dr. Slump instead of Senbei Norimaki, which the author agrees turned out better. Toriyama stated that Torishima enjoys romance and that the relationships of Arale and Obotchaman, Akane and Tsukutsun, and Taro and Tsururin in Dr. Slump were all his ideas. He also stated that when starting Dragon Ball, Torishima had wanted Goku and Bulma to form a relationship. Loosely basing Dragon Ball on Journey to the West was the idea of Torishima, who chose the novel largely because it was a free intellectual property, but also because its Chinese setting was not common in manga at the time and would make it both unique and differentiate it from Dr. Slump's US West Coast feel. Toriyama created the Dragon Ball character Cell after Torishima, no longer his editor, was disappointed with Androids 19 and 20, and later Androids 17 and 18, as villains.

Torishima said he was disappointed when Masakazu Katsura told him he wanted to draw a transforming superhero manga. He explained that, while science fiction works in television with its special effects, it does not come across visually in manga. So Torishima proposed making it a school story involving girls and asked the artist to make the main character more realistic and familiar to readers, resulting in Wing-Man. Katsura credited Torishima with coming up with ideas for Video Girl Ai. It was Torishima who brought Tetsuo Hara the offer from Capcom to create the character designs for the video game Saturday Night Slam Masters.

Torishima has been parodied often in many manga series serialized in Weekly Shōnen Jump. The most notable being the character Dr. Mashirito in Toriyama's Dr. Slump, who serves as the series' most prominent antagonist and has the same name as the editor but with the syllables reversed. He also inspired other manga characters such as Matoriv in Dragon Quest: The Adventure of Dai, Torishiman in Tottemo! Luckyman, and Doctor Mashirito in I Become a Gedoh-Man. by Shinji Hiramatsu. A direct parody of Torishima appears in Bakuman by Tsugumi Ohba and Takeshi Obata. When asked for his opinion on why he has been parodied so much, Torishima suggested it might be because his frankness and exuberance makes him easy to turn into a character, or, that some people were afraid to argue with him at work and used the parodies to get revenge and vent frustration.
