= Dr. Slump =

Japanese manga series by Akira Toriyama

- First tankōbon volume cover, featuring Arale Norimaki

Dr.スランプ (Dokutā Suranpu)
- Genre: Science fiction comedy
- Manga
- Written by: Akira Toriyama
- Published by: Shueisha
- English publisher: NA: Viz Media
- Imprint: Jump Comics
- Magazine: Weekly Shōnen Jump
- Original run: February 4, 1980 – September 10, 1984
- Volumes: 18
- Anime television series

Dr. Slump – Arale-chan
- Directed by: Minoru Okazaki
- Produced by: Tokizō Tsuchiya; Kenji Shimizu
- Written by: Masaki Tsuji
- Music by: Shunsuke Kikuchi
- Studio: Toei Animation
- Original network: FNS (Fuji TV)
- Original run: April 8, 1981 – February 19, 1986
- Episodes: 243 (256 segments)
- Anime television series
- Directed by: Shigeyasu Yamauchi
- Produced by: Daisuke Kawakami; Tatsuya Yoshida; Yōko Matsuzaki
- Written by: Satoru Nishizono
- Music by: Funta
- Studio: Toei Animation
- Licensed by: NA: Tubi
- Original network: FNS (Fuji TV)
- Original run: November 26, 1997 – September 22, 1999
- Episodes: 74 (93 segments)
- Manga

Dr. Mashirito – Abale-chan
- Written by: Akira Toriyama
- Published by: Shueisha
- Magazine: Monthly Shōnen Jump
- Published: April 2007
- Related media
- List of Dr. Slump films
- icon

Dr. Slump (Japanese: Dr.スランプ, Hepburn: Dokutā Suranpu) is a Japanese manga series written and illustrated by Akira Toriyama. It was serialized in Shueisha's shōnen manga magazine Weekly Shōnen Jump from February 1980 to September 1984, with the chapters collected in 18 tankōbon volumes. The series follows the humorous adventures of the little girl robot Arale Norimaki, her creator Senbei Norimaki, and the other residents of the bizarre Penguin Village.

The manga was adapted into an anime television series by Toei Animation that ran on Fuji TV from 1981 to 1986 for 243 episodes. A remake series was created thirteen years after the manga ended, consisting of 74 episodes that were broadcast from 1997 to 1999. The series has also spawned several novels, video games, and eleven animated films.

Dr. Slump launched Toriyama's career. It was awarded the Shogakukan Manga Award for shōnen and shōjo manga in 1981, and has sold over 30 million copies in Japan. The manga was released in North America by Viz Media from 2004 to 2009. Discotek Media released the first five films in North America in 2014.

== Plot ==
Dr. Slump is set in Penguin Village (ペンギン村, Pengin Mura), a place where humans co-exist with all sorts of anthropomorphic animals and other objects. In this village lives Senbei Norimaki, an inventor. In the first chapter, he builds what he hopes will be the world's most perfect little girl robot, named Arale Norimaki. However, she turns out to be in severe need of eyeglasses. She is also very naïve, and in later issues she has adventures such as bringing a huge bear home, having mistaken it for a pet. To Senbei's credit, she does have super-strength. In general, the manga focuses on Arale's misunderstandings of humanity and Senbei's inventions, rivalries, and romantic misadventures. In the middle of the series, a recurring villain named Dr. Mashirito appears as a rival to Senbei.

== Humor ==
Dr. Slump is filled with puns and toilet humor, and parodies of both Japanese and American culture. For example, one of the recurring characters is Suppaman, a short, fat, pompous buffoon who changes into a Superman-like alter-ego by eating a sour-tasting ("suppai" in Japanese) umeboshi. Unlike Superman, Suppaman cannot fly, and instead pretends to fly by lying belly down on a skateboard and scooting through the streets. Also, one of the village's policemen wears a Star Wars-style stormtrooper helmet, just as in the American movies. Toriyama himself has been portrayed as a bird (the "tori" in his last name means "bird", hence the name of his production studio Bird Studio), although it has been suggested (by himself even) that he actually based the design of Senbei on himself. In addition, other real-life people make appearances as well, such as Toriyama's editor (Kazuhiko Torishima), assistants, wife, his colleague friends (such as Masakazu Katsura), and others.

== Production ==
With Toriyama a newcomer to manga and his editor Kazuhiko Torishima still relatively new at his job as well, the two worked for 18 months with Torishima rejecting all the author's ideas until the first draft of Dr. Slump. One of these rejected works, Ageha-chō Kansatsu Nikki (アゲハ町観察日記), served as a basis for Dr. Slump. After his 1979 one-shot Tomato the Cutesy Gumshoe saw some popularity, Toriyama decided to create another manga with a female lead character and that became Dr. Slump. Toriyama drew several short omake included in the Dr. Slump tankōbon volumes that supposedly depict actual events on the production of the series, although, as they are often humorous, the level of truthfulness to them is uncertain. In one, he claimed that when he told Torishima that he wanted to make a manga about a doctor, the editor told him to add a robot. Toriyama originally wanted a very large robot, but as it would not fit in the panels, he instead made it small. When Torishima rejected that idea, he made the robot a girl, knowing Torishima would find her "cute". He also stated that Senbei was supposed to be the main character, but his editor told him to make it Arale instead, which Toriyama agrees turned out better. The act of having Senbei and Midori get married came from having nothing else to draw that week, and it happened quickly because he does not like romance. He went on to state that Torishima does enjoy romance, and that the relationships of Arale and Obotchaman, Akane and Tsukutsun, and Taro and Tsururin were all Torishima's ideas.

Toriyama did not expect Dr. Slump to last long, as even before it debuted Torishima was asking him what he would draw for his next series. However, it lasted for roughly five years. When Toriyama began Dr. Slump, he worked at home, where he lived with his parents, and had one assistant who worked one day a week. Toriyama has said several times that he typically would not have any ideas for the story for that week's chapter, but would think up something as soon as Torishima called asking. He thought up each week's story as he drew and sent the rough draft to Torishima at Weekly Shōnen Jump headquarters in Tokyo by air courier from Nagoya Airport. After getting the approval of his editor, he began by drawing the lines that stick out of the frames, then the frames themselves, before using a g-pen to draw clear crisp lines at roughly one page an hour. After he had around eight pages finished, his assistant Hisashi Tanaka (田中久志) (also known as Hiswashi (ひすゎし)) came over, although Toriyama stated he only allowed him to color. For color pages, Toriyama first drew them with permanent ink and used water-soluble color pens, before touching up with a wet brush. Later in serialization (around volume 13, as stated in volume 18), Takashi Matsuyama (まつやまたかし) became his assistant when Hiswashi started his own series, although Hiswashi occasionally still helped out, as did Toriyama's wife when they were close to a deadline.

In 2016, Torishima said that although Dr. Slump was very successful, having debuted at number two in the magazine's reader rankings, Toriyama wanted to stop it after about six months. He explained that because it was a self-contained comedy each week, if something did not work, the author had to change everything. Torishima said that because it was a top-ranking series, would regularly sell a million copies, and had an anime about to begin, Jump and Shueisha would not allow it to end. However, Torishima claimed the magazine's chief editor told him that if they could come up with something more interesting and successful then they could. In order to have time to discuss new ideas they had to adjust the weekly schedule, finishing a Dr. Slump chapter in five days instead of seven. Toriyama stated that one of the conditions he agreed to that allowed him to end the popular Dr. Slump, was that he start his next series relatively soon after. He began Dragon Ball roughly three months later.

In his own words, Toriyama described the scenery of Dr. Slump as having an "American West Coast" feel. Torishima recalled that when he asked Toriyama why he drew relatively sparse backgrounds, his reply was simply that it was easier that way. However, Toriyama has stated that he was particular about the art, working more hours on it than he would later on Dragon Ball. In an actual chapter of Dr. Slump, where Toriyama and Matsuyama appear, it was revealed that Matsuyama draws most of the backgrounds and houses. Toriyama often used colored paper, a technique fairly common in design, but less-so in manga. He stated that the tournament-type events, such as the Penguin Village Grand Prix and the kick the can contest, were popular with readers and inspired the Tenkaichi Budōkai in Dragon Ball.

Torishima described the Dr. Slump anime as unsuccessful in his opinion because it did not loyally follow the manga. He said this was because it was the first time the Weekly Shōnen Jump team had to manage an anime based on one of their manga and its creative process, explaining that, if something went wrong, it was too late to change because it was already animated.

== Media ==
=== Manga ===
Akira Toriyama's Dr. Slump was originally serialized in the shōnen manga anthology Weekly Shōnen Jump from issue No. 5/6 on February 4, 1980, to No. 39 on September 10, 1984. Its 236 individual chapters were collected in 18 tankōbon volumes by publisher Shueisha under the Jump Comics imprint. It was reassembled as a nine-volume aizōban edition in 1990, a nine-volume bunkoban edition in 1995, and a 15-volume kanzenban edition in 2006. Viz Media licensed the series for North America in 2004, and published the first volume on March 3, 2005, with translation done by Alexander O. Smith and some censorship. All 18 original volumes have been released in North America as of May 5, 2009.

After Dr. Slump ended in 1984, its characters returned for an extended cameo in Toriyama's next series Dragon Ball, in which Arale and Son Goku briefly team up to defeat General Blue during the Red Ribbon Army storyline. A Dr. Slump follow-up manga was written by Takao Koyama and illustrated by Katsuyoshi Nakatsuru, with supervision by Toriyama. It was serialized in V Jump from February 21, 1993, to September 1996 under the title The Brief Return of Dr. Slump (ちょっとだけかえってきたDr.スランプ, Chotto Dake Kaettekita Dokutā Suranpu). It was collected into four tankōbon volumes.

To promote the release of the first Dr. Slump – Arale-chan anime DVD box set, Akira Toriyama illustrated a special one-shot colored spin-off manga titled Dr. Mashirito - Abale-chan (Dr.MASHIRITO ABALEちゃん) published in the April 2007 issue of Monthly Shōnen Jump. The story centers around an evil counterpart of Arale created by Dr. Mashirito Jr., named Abale.

=== Anime ===
The Dr. Slump manga was adapted into two separate anime television series by Toei Animation, both of which aired on Fuji TV. The first, Dr. Slump – Arale-chan (Dr.スランプ アラレちゃん), ran from April 8, 1981, to February 19, 1986, and spanned 243 episodes. The second anime, simply titled Dr. Slump (ドクタースランプ), ran from November 26, 1997, to September 22, 1999, and lasted seventy-four episodes.

The first anime was released on home video for the first time in 2007, remastered, in two 22-disc DVD sets; Slump the Box N'Cha (SLUMP THE BOX んちゃ) on March 23, which contains the first 120 episodes, and Slump the Box Hoyoyo (SLUMP THE BOX ほよよ) on September 14, which contains the remainder. Likewise, the second series was released the following year as Slump the Box 90's on March 21. The first anime was then released in twenty 2-disc sets (the last was 3-disc) of roughly twelve episodes each, titled Slump the Collection; the first three sets on October 9, 2008, the next five on November 28, the next six on December 21, and the last six on January 30, 2009. The first episode of the original anime was adapted into English by Harmony Gold USA in 1984, but the pilot was never picked up. Characters from Dr. Slump also prominently feature in the 69th episode of Dragon Ball Super, "Goku vs. Arale! An Off-the-Wall Battle Spells the End of the Earth?"

In February 2021, American streaming service Tubi announced their acquisition of the Dr. Slump TV anime for release with English subtitles.

=== Films ===
Toei has also created eleven animated films based on Dr. Slump, beginning with Hello! Wonder Island on July 18, 1981. They continued to produce one film a year until 1985; "Hoyoyo!" Space Adventure on July 10, 1982, Dr. Slump and Arale-chan: Hoyoyo! The Great Race Around the World on March 13, 1983, Dr. Slump and Arale-chan: Hoyoyo! The Secret of Nanaba Castle on December 22, 1984, and Dr. Slump and Arale-chan: Hoyoyo! The City of Dreams, Mechapolis on July 13, 1985.

In 1993, Dr. Slump and Arale-chan: N-cha! Clear Skies Over Penguin Village and Dr. Slump and Arale-chan: N-cha! From Penguin Village with Love were released on March 6 and July 10 respectively. In 1994, Dr. Slump and Arale-chan: Hoyoyo!! Follow the Rescued Shark... and Dr. Slump and Arale-chan: N-cha!! Excited Heart of Summer Vacation were released on March 12 and July 9 respectively. On March 6, 1999, Arale's Surprise Burn was produced.

Toriyama's 2007 one-shot was adapted into a five-minute short titled Dr. Slump: Dr. Mashirito and Abale-chan that was shown alongside the theatrically released One Piece Movie: The Desert Princess and the Pirates: Adventures in Alabasta. In 2008, all eleven films were released in a remastered DVD box set titled Slump the Box Movies on September 21. Discotek Media acquired the first five Dr. Slump films for release in North America and released in a two-disc DVD box set in Japanese with English subtitles on July 29, 2014.

=== Video games ===
A series of three Dr. Slump – Arale-chan video games called Hoyoyo Bomber (ホヨヨボンバー), Gatchan! Kazi Kazi (巻 ガッちゃん! ガジガジ) and Ncha! Bycha (んちゃ! バイちゃ), by Animest were released as Game & Watch clones in 1982. A Dr. Slump video game was released in 1983 for the Arcadia 2001. Enix released four games of Dr. Slump with the first one being Mazeland (めいろやしき) for Sharp MZ-700 in 1983, Dr. Slump Bubble Blitz (Dr.スランプ バブル大作戦) was released for the NEC PC-6001mkII in 1984, Arale No Jump Up (アラレのJump up) for NEC PC-8001mkII in September 1984 and the last one being Dr. Slump Hashire! Senbeisan (Dr.スランプ 走れ! せんべいさん) for the Sharp X1 in 1985. Pony Canyon released a text-based game called Penguin Village (ペンギンビレッジ) in February 1984. An action game, simply titled Dr. Slump (ドクタースランプ), for the PlayStation based on the second television series was released on March 18, 1999, by Bandai. Dr. Slump: Arale-Chan (Dr.スランプ アラレちゃん) was released on October 30, 2008, for the Nintendo DS. Arale appears in the 1988 Famicom game Famicom Jump: Hero Retsuden. In the Nintendo DS game Jump Super Stars, Arale and Dr. Mashirito are player characters, while Senbei appears as a support character. They both return in the sequel Jump Ultimate Stars, where Senbei, Midori, Gatchan, Obotchaman, and Unchi-kun are support characters. Arale appears as a playable character in J-Stars Victory VS, with Penguin Village as a featured stage.

Arale appears in several Dragon Ball video games as well. She and several other Dr. Slump characters appear in Dragon Ball: Daimaō Fukkatsu, she alone is a hidden battle in Dragon Ball 3: Goku Den, and she and Senbei briefly appear in Dragon Ball Z: Super Goku Den — Totsugeki-Hen. Arale is a playable character, and Penguin Village is a playable map, in Dragon Ball Z: Budokai Tenkaichi 2 and 3 for the PlayStation 2 and Wii. In the PS2 game Super Dragon Ball Z, Suppaman appears in the background of the city level; after breaking the porta-potty, Suppaman will roll off on his skateboard. Arale can also be unlocked as a playable character in Dragon Ball: Revenge of King Piccolo for the Wii, Dragon Ball: Origins 2 for the DS, and Dragon Ball Fusions for the Nintendo 3DS. Finally, she, along with Gatchan and Senbei Norimaki, appear as non-playable characters in the PlayStation 4, Xbox One, and Microsoft Windows game Dragon Ball Z: Kakarot, as does Penguin Village.

Puyopuyo!! Quest features the event as part of the Dr. Slump franchise: Dr. Slump Arale-chan Festival, from July 15 to 21, 2019.

=== Other media ===
There have been several light novels based on Dr. Slump. The first two, Novel!? Dr. Slump (小説!? Dr.スランプ) released in July 1981 and Novel!? Dr. Slump Strikes Back (小説!? Dr.スランプの逆襲) released in April 1982, were written by Masaki Tsuji, who also wrote for the anime adaptation. A novel written by Shun'ichi Yukimuro and based on the second movie was released on July 15, 1982. The Sun fell in Penguin Village (ペンギン村に陽は落ちて) and Ghostbusters (ゴーストバスターズ), released in October 1989 and June 27, 1997, respectively, are original works written by Genichiro Takahashi, but draw from the world of Dr. Slump.

A radio drama adaptation was broadcast at around the same time the anime was airing. Arale was voiced by Yuko Hara, keyboardist of the popular rock band Southern All Stars.

In 2014, two commercials featuring Dr. Slump were created by Toei for Suzuki. The commercials advertise the car manufacturer's Kei SUV Hustler and include new acting from Mami Koyama as Arale and Kumiko Nishihara as Gatchan.

In celebration of the anime adaptation's 35th anniversary, the Dr. Slump – Arale-chan N'Cha! Best album, containing music from the series, was released on June 1, 2016.

== Reception ==
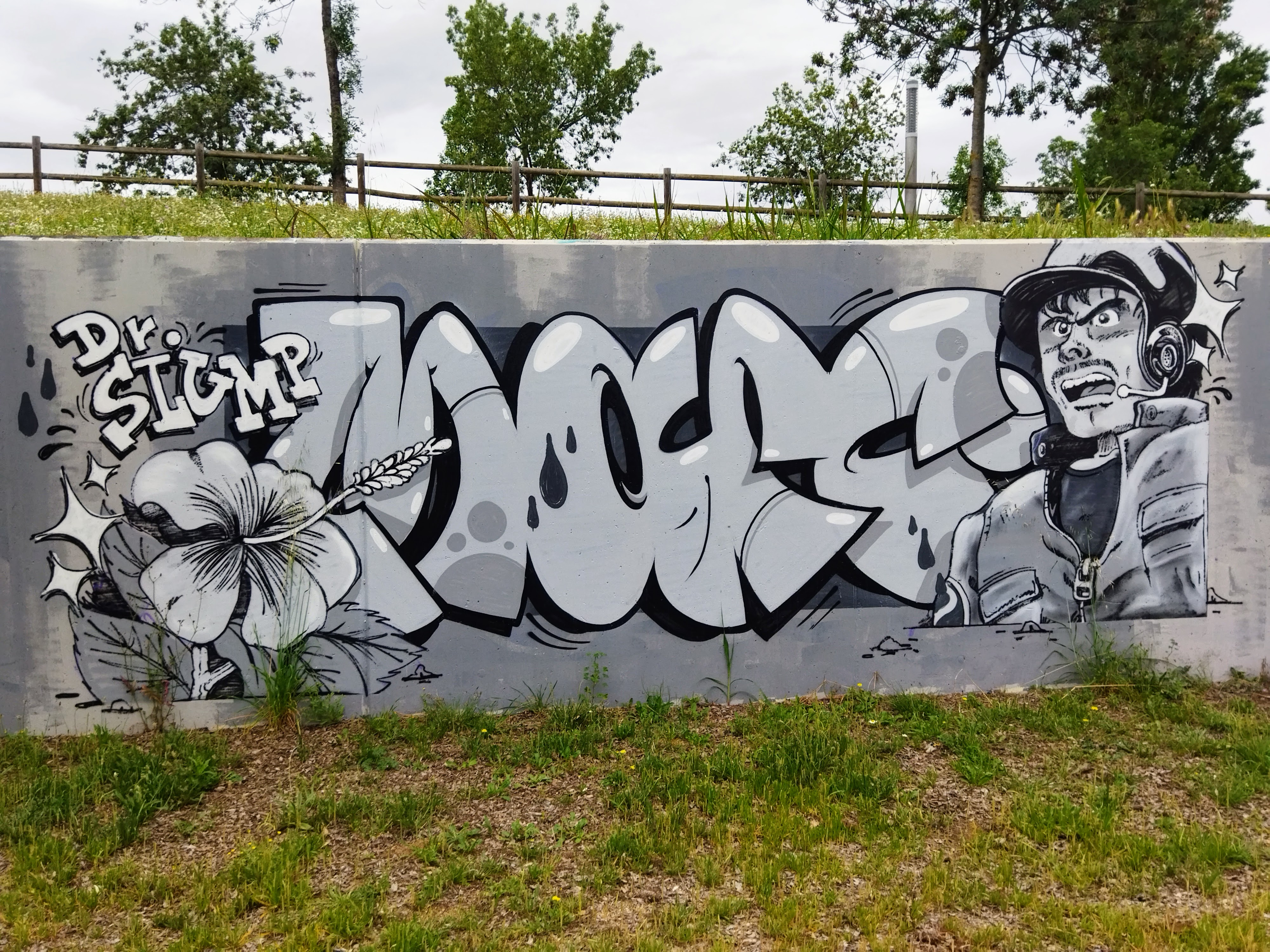
A Dr. Slump-themed mural featuring Senbei in Catalonia, Spain

The Dr. Slump manga has had over 30 million copies in circulation. Only a year after its debut, the series was awarded the 1981 Shogakukan Manga Award for shōnen and shōjo manga. Viz Media's North American release of the first volume of Dr. Slump was nominated for the 2005 Quill Award in the Graphic Novel category. The first anime adaptation of Dr. Slump was also popular, holding the coveted Saturday 6pm timeslot for five years. With a 36.9% average household rating, its December 16, 1981, episode is the third most watched anime since the television ratings group Video Research began keeping track on September 26, 1977. In 1982, it was voted the 13th Favorite Anime in Japanese magazine Animage's fourth annual Anime Grand Prix. In 2001, Animage ranked it number 48 on its list of the Top 100 Anime. TV Asahi released two Top 100 Anime lists in 2005, in the web poll Dr. Slump ranked number 34, while a nationwide poll of multiple age groups named it number 29. The following year, a list created from polling 100 celebrities had it in the 25th position. A running gag in Dr. Slump that utilizes feces has been reported as an inspiration for the Pile of Poo emoji.

Kazuhiko Torishima named Dr. Slump as his favorite manga that he worked on, because it was "incredibly fresh" and changed its era. He explained, before Toriyama and Hisashi Eguchi appeared, the industry was full of "story manga", which are plot heavy, but artists like them wanted to play with readers and made their characters the most important part. Ian Jones-Quartey, a former producer of the American animated series Steven Universe and creator of OK K.O.! Let's Be Heroes, is a fan of Dragon Ball and Dr. Slump, and uses Toriyama's vehicle designs as reference for his own. He also stated that "We're all big Toriyama fans on [Steven Universe], which kind of shows a bit."

Mike Toole of Anime News Network called Dr. Slump "the greatest manga of all time", filled with "parody, gags, and fart jokes that everyone from toddlers to grandparents can enjoy together". Jason Thompson referred to Dr. Slump as the best series Toriyama has created, claiming it is better drawn and more creative than Dragon Ball. He also reports that it is considered "the last non-manufactured hit" by many in the Japanese manga industry, particularity among Weekly Shōnen Jump titles. The Asahi Shimbun wrote that the manga's appeal lies in its "visually pleasing drawings, humor and laid-back atmosphere, which set it distinctly apart from works that glorified 'moral virtues' like extreme endurance, self-discipline and so on." In their review, Publishers Weekly stated "Toriyama has created his own demented sitcom, and his fantastic imagination and comic invention never let up", "The [English] translation is a bit flat, but the uncommonly good storytelling more than makes up for it." Eduardo M. Chavez of Mania Entertainment summarized Dr. Slump as a "quirky slap-stick comedy entirely based in fantasy." He thinks that while Toriyama's usual art style uses "SD" characters, Dr. Slump also shows hints that he can draw realistic. He noted that "little nuances", particularity puns, are lost in translation from Japanese to English and expressed disdain for Viz's censorship, saying it took away from the honesty of the series. Chavez feels that what the characters do never crosses the line into inappropriate; "The jokes might not be wholesome, but they are genuinely funny and harmless"; and went on to say that the series fills the void for "all ages manga" in bookstores and libraries.

Reviewing the first five movies, Carl Kimlinger of Anime News Network summarized Dr. Slump as "random silly adventures ... delivered with a lot of surreal nonsense humor, only the most basic sense of continuity, and not a whiff of substance or seriousness." He felt that much of the humor comes simply from the visuals; stating that the vintage hand-done art and animation provide a "warmth" and "raises Slump's visuals above" other anime. However, he called the background music "non-descript" and stated that the films are only for viewers who are familiar with the series, as they provide no exposition.
