= Arale Norimaki =

- Dr. Slump character
- Arale's final appearance in the Dr. Slump manga, drawn by Akira Toriyama
- First appearance: Dr. Slump chapter 1: "The Birth of Arale", February 4, 1980 (Weekly Shōnen Jump 1980)
- Created by: Akira Toriyama
- Voiced by: Japanese; Mami Koyama (first anime, Dragon Ball, Dragon Ball Super); Yuko Hara (radio drama); Taeko Kawata (second anime); English; Lara Cody (Dr. Slump pilot; Harmony Gold dub); Linda Young (Dragon Ball; Funimation dub); Leda Davies (Dragon Ball; Blue Water dub); Sharon Mann (Mystical Adventure; AB Groupe dub); Andrea Kwan (Dr. Slump; Omni dub, initially); Gloria Ansell (Dr. Slump; Omni dub, replacement); Brina Palencia (Dragon Ball Super)

In-universe information
- Species: Humanoid robot
- Gender: Female
- Relatives: Senbei Norimaki (creator/father); Midori Norimaki (stepmother); Turbo Norimaki (brother); Nitro Norimaki (sister); Gatchans (stepsiblings); Obotchaman (husband)

Arale Norimaki (Japanese: 則巻アラレ, Hepburn: Norimaki Arare) is a fictional character and the protagonist of the Dr. Slump manga series, created by Akira Toriyama. She is a humanoid robot built by Senbei Norimaki who looks like a young girl. She is known for her naïveté, energetic personality, lack of common sense, and amazing strength. Senbei tries to convince the other citizens of Penguin Village that she is just a normal human girl; it seems to work, despite her superhuman athletic ability. Among her strengths, she can use abilities that range from the terrain splitting Chikyūwari (地球割り; "Earth Chop") to the beam-like N'chahō (んちゃ砲; "N'cha Cannon"). However, she is nearsighted and needs to wear glasses. The character also makes appearances in various other media, most notably in the Dragon Ball media franchise.

== Creation and conception ==
Toriyama claimed that when he told his editor, Kazuhiko Torishima, that he wanted to make a manga about a doctor, Torishima told him to add a robot. Toriyama originally wanted a very large robot, but as it would not fit in the panels, he instead made it small. When his editor rejected that idea, he made the robot a girl knowing Torishima would find her "cute." He also stated that Senbei was supposed to be the main character, but his editor told him to make it Arale instead, which Toriyama agrees turned out better. Torishima later elaborated on this, saying that Arale was initially only a guest character for one chapter. However, because he really liked Toriyama's girl characters the editor wanted her to be the main character. The artist felt differently because Weekly Shōnen Jump is aimed at boys. The two made a bet; Toriyama would create a one-shot manga with a female lead and if it took fourth place or lower in the magazine's reader poll, he could get rid of Arale after the single chapter. Torishima won when Tomato the Cutesy Gumshoe (1979) came in third place, but because Toriyama is stubborn, he refused to change the Dr. Slump name.

Like the names of many other characters, Arale is a pun on the name for a bite-sized rice cracker (arare), and with the family name ("Norimaki Arale") it refers to a sort of arare wrapped with nori seaweed. Toriyama purposefully gave his protagonists plain appearances as he prefers to focus on the story. He believed that having weak-looking characters turn out to actually be strong is more interesting; Arale and Son Goku are prime examples of this. Initially, her glasses were just a gag, with Toriyama wanting to remove them as they made her more difficult to draw. However, they became a trademark of Arale's and readers who had to wear glasses wrote him saying that by Arale having them it made them feel better about themselves, so he ended up keeping them. Arale is usually shown with purple hair, although it is dark brown in the 1997 anime.

== Appearances ==
=== In Dr. Slump ===
Arale Norimaki's appearance in the 1981 Doctor Slump anime

Arale Norimaki's appearance in the 1997 Doctor Slump anime

Arale poses as Senbei's sister or daughter, depending on who Senbei is talking to. The Norimaki family only grows from there when Arale and Senbei discover an egg when traveling to the past. The egg hatches into a small winged creature that they nickname Gatchan. Then Senbei marries the girl of his dreams (Midori Yamabuki) and they have a son named Turbo. As if the house was not full enough, Gatchan inexplicably splits into two separate entities.

The Dr. Slump series is a self-proclaimed gag manga with no ongoing plot. The entire series is about Arale's humorous exploration of the dynamics of life and the adventures Senbei and his inventions send them on. Arale has unique phrases she often uses, such as "N'cha" (んちゃ; a greeting she picked up from Senbei), "Bye'cha" (バイちゃ; "goodbye"), "Hoyoyo" (ほよよ) to express bewilderment, and yelling "Kiiin" (キーン) when she runs with her hands out.

=== In Dragon Ball ===
Arale appears in Toriyama's Dragon Ball when Son Goku chases General Blue all the way to Penguin Village; she then defeats Blue with one kick and one headbutt after he paralyzes Goku. She is also able to ride on the Kinto'un, which indicates her as being pure of heart. In the anime adaptations, Arale is first seen in a picture on the wall of the capsule house Bulma creates in Dragon Ball episode 2, again on the television that Master Roshi is watching in episode 16, and on a poster in Gohan's bedroom in Dragon Ball Z. She also appears in The Great Mystical Adventure film, and her face was shown in the eighth Dragon Ball Z movie. Arale has appeared twice in Dragon Ball Super, first making a brief cameo appearance in episode 43 and later playing a key role in episode 69.

=== In other media ===
Arale is a playable character in the crossover video games Jump Super Stars, Jump Ultimate Stars, and J-Stars Victory Vs. She is also playable in several Dragon Ball video games, including Dragon Ball Z: Budokai Tenkaichi 3, Dragon Ball: Revenge of King Piccolo and Dragon Ball: Origins 2, and makes a non-playable appearance in Dragon Ball Z: Kakarot

In 2014, two commercials featuring Dr. Slump were created by Toei Animation for Suzuki. The commercials advertise the car manufacturer's Kei SUV Hustler and include new acting from Mami Koyama as Arale and Kumiko Nishihara as Gatchan. In 2016, Ayami Nakajo portrayed Arale in a commercial for G.u. clothing. It shows Akane Kimidori (Yuki Uchida) and Peasuke Soramame (Kengo Kora) bewildered when Arale trades in her trademark overalls for a pleated skirt.

== Voice actors ==
In Japanese, Arale is voiced by Mami Koyama in the first Dr. Slump anime, reprising the role in nearly every subsequent appearance, including all Dragon Ball media. She is voiced by Taeko Kawata in the second Dr. Slump anime and by Yuko Hara, keyboardist of the popular rock band Southern All Stars, in the radio drama.

In English, the first voice actress for Arale was Lara Cody for the Harmony Gold dub of the pilot episode of Dr. Slump. Linda Young voices Arale in the Funimation dubs of Dragon Ball and Dragon Ball: Mystical Adventure. Canadian actress Leda Davies voices Arale in the Blue Water version of Dragon Ball. Sharon Mann provides her voice in the AB Groupe dub of Mystical Adventure. Omni Productions' dub of Dr. Slump initially featured Andrea Kwan as Arale, with Gloria Ansell taking over in later episodes. Brina Palencia provides Arale's English voice for Dragon Ball Super and all Dragon Ball video games beginning with Dragon Ball Z: Budokai Tenkaichi 3.

== Reception ==
In 1982, Arale came in 12th place in Animage's fourth annual Anime Grand Prix for Favorite Character. Carl Kimlinger of Anime News Network wrote that among Dr. Slump's cast, Arale is the standout; "The way she laughs and runs and raises unwitting hell are all unforgettable." Her role in Dragon Ball Super was praised by Sam Leach from ANN due to how she clashes with the protagonists Goku and Vegeta; the latter often breaking the fourth wall stating they cannot defeat a person from a gag series.

When asked in 1987 who would win if Arale and Son Goku were to fight, Toriyama said Arale was stronger. Masashi Kishimoto, creator of Naruto, gained an interest in drawing during his childhood from drawing pictures of Arale.

=== In popular culture ===
In the 1985 Hong Kong film My Lucky Stars, Jackie Chan's character appears in an Arale costume while working undercover in a theme park.

Discussing Mario's center of gravity in a strategy guide for the 1996 video game Super Mario 64, creator Shigeru Miyamoto said Mario "sort of runs like Arale-chan, with the correct sense of weight in the body."

Japanese comedian Hōsei Yamasaki dressed up as Arale, doing her signature "Kiiin" and "N'cha" on the Downtown no Gaki no Tsukai ya Arahende!! Cosplay Bus Tour series. Because of failing to complete his task (getting spaghetti for the entire cast) he then had to fly to Italy to get spaghetti for the entire cast and crew, dressed as Arale all the way.

Several episodes of the American TV show America's Funniest Home Videos feature a video in which a man falls down after sticking his head through a cutout of Arale. The video first appears in Season 1, Episode 3.

The 2004 Samurai Champloo episode "Bogus Booty" has a scene where Mugen impersonates Arale's signature run by sticking his arms out and making the sound "Kiiin".

The main character of the 2018 video game Dragon Quest Builders 2, for which Toriyama was the character designer, runs with their hands out like Arale.

Korean mixed martial artist Seo Hee Ham is nicknamed "Arale-chan" in Japan due to her appearance outside of the ring bearing resemblance to the fictional character.
