= Yuko Hara =

Japanese musician, member of Southern all stars (1956-)

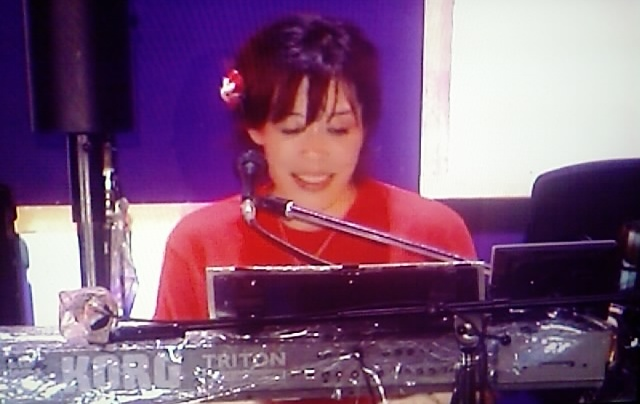
- Hara performing with the Southern All Stars in August 2008

Background information
- Born: 桑田 由子 (Yuko Kuwata née Yuko Hara); December 11, 1956 (age 69); Yokohama, Kanagawa, Japan
- Genres: Rock; pop; blues; folk; kayōkyoku
- Occupations: Musician, singer-songwriter
- Instruments: Vocals, keyboards, piano, organ, synthesizers
- Years active: 1974–present
- Labels: Victor Entertainment, Victor TAISHITA Label
- Website: Southern All Stars

Yuko Hara (原 由子 Hara Yūko, born December 11, 1956, in Yokohama, Japan, nicknamed "Harabo") is the keyboardist for Southern All Stars. She is also a vocalist and writes many of her own songs.

She is married to Keisuke Kuwata, the multi-instrumentalist frontman for the Southern All-Stars, and bandleader of the Kuwata band. Together, they have two sons. Her parents' home is a tempura restaurant in Yokohama.

Her song ''Daisuki!Happy end'' is the theme song for the Japanese dub of Hoodwinked!.

== Discography ==
=== Original albums ===
- Yuko Hara ga Kataru Hitotoki (はらゆうこが語るひととき, When Yuko Hara Talks to You) (1981)
- Miss Yokohamadult Yuko Hara 2nd (1983)
- Mother (1991)

=== Compilation albums ===
- Loving You (1998)
- Hallad (ハラッド, Haraddo) (2010)

=== Cover albums ===
- Tokyo Tamoure (東京タムレ) (2002)

=== Singles ===
- "I Love You wa Hitorigoto" (I Love Youはひとりごと, I Love You Is a Soliloquy) (1981)
- "Usagi no Uta" (うさぎの唄, Rabbit Song) (1981)
- "Tanjōbi no Yoru" (誕生日の夜, Birthday Night) (1982)
- "Koi wa, Gotabō Mōshiagemasu" (恋は、ご多忙申し上げます, Love Means Busyness) (1983)
- "Yokohama Lady Blues" (横浜 Lady Blues) (1983)
- "Ajisai no Uta" (あじさいのうた, Hydrangea Song) (1987)
- "Girl" (ガール, Gāru) (1988)
- "Kaiju no Uta" (かいじゅうのうた, Monster Song) (1988)
- "Tameiki no Bell ga Naru Toki" (ためいきのベルが鳴るとき, When the Sighing Bell Rings) (1988)
- "Aishite Aishite Aishichatta no yo" (愛して愛して愛しちゃったのよ, I've Loved You Loved You Loved You So Much) (1990) (with Inamura Orchestra)
- "Heart Setsunaku" (ハートせつなく, The Heart Is Painful) (1991)
- "Jin Jin" (じんじん) (1991)
- "Makeru na Onna no Ko!" (負けるな女の子!, Girls, Don't Give Up!) (1991)
- "Minna Ii Ko" (みんないい子, Everyone's a Good Kid) (1997) (with Shingo Katori)
- "Namida no Tenshi ni Hohoemi o" (涙の天使に微笑みを, Smiling at the Angel of Tears) (1997)
- "Daisuki!Happy end" for the Japanese release of Hoodwinked!.
- "Yume o Chikatta Ki no Shita de" (夢を誓った木の下で, Under the Tree Where We Swore to Our Dreams) (2007) (as Harafūmi, with Fūmidō)
- "Yume o Arigatō" (夢をアリガトウ, Thank You for the Dreams) (2009)

== Radio Drama ==
- Dr.Slump(1981)-She voiced Arale.
