= List of Dr. Slump characters =

The characters of Dr. Slump as seen in the first anime.

The Dr. Slump manga series features an extensive cast of characters created by Akira Toriyama. It follows the humorous adventures of the little girl robot Arale Norimaki, her creator Senbei Norimaki and the other residents of the bizarre Penguin Village.

While many of the characters are humans, the cast also includes anthropomorphic animals and objects, robots, extraterrestrial lifeforms, and gods. Characters that are parodies of historical figures, fairy tales, popular Western movies, and real people that author Toriyama knows are also common. Many of these characters make a minor appearance in Toriyama's more well-known series, Dragon Ball.

== Creation and conception ==
Toriyama drew several short omake manga included in the Dr. Slump tankōban volumes that supposedly depict the actual events of how he came up with the characters, although, as they are often humorous, the level of truthfulness to them is uncertain. In one he claimed that when he told his editor, Kazuhiko Torishima, that he wanted to make a manga about a doctor, Torishima told him to add a robot. Toriyama originally wanted a very large robot, but as it would not fit in the panels, instead made it small. When Torishima rejected that idea, he made the robot a girl knowing Torishima would find her "cute". Another depicts him, having wanted to give the Norimakis a pet monster and having that rejected by his editor as it was not cute, coming up with the idea of Gatchan after his sister brought her child to see him. Gatchan was based on the main character in one of Toriyama's rejected manga, called Ageha-chō Kansatsu Nikki (アゲハ町観察日記). The author stated that Torishima enjoys romance and that the relationships of Arale and Obotchaman, Akane and Tsukutsun, and Taro and Tsururin in Dr. Slump were all his ideas.

Toriyama's editor Torishima was the model for the evil character Dr. Mashirito. Torishima later explained that when Toriyama decided to have a "mad scientist" appear, he told him the character's initial design was "too weak" and to come up with someone "nasty" to have a big impact, and to imagine the person he hates the most in the world. Having not received the manuscript until just before the deadline, Torishima did not have any time to change it with Toriyama having given the character Torishima's face and changed the name to his with the syllables reversed. The editor hoped the character would be unpopular and therefore a one-off, but everyone loved it because Toriyama had previously written about his editor and the audience knew who it was based on.

The character Nikochan, an alien species with their buttocks on their heads, was hastily created after Toriyama was pressed for time having played too many video games and was initially rejected as "filth", with him given another night to re-work it. Having continued to play games instead, Toriyama sent in the same manuscript the next day with Torishima accepting, apparently having not noticed that it was the same. However, in a later volume Toriyama said that Torishima thought Nikochan was disgusting, but accepted because it was too close to the deadline to change.

While thinking that Arale was too strong during a meal, Toriyama was startled by eating an umeboshi and came up with Suppaman. However, because he did not enjoy the sour taste, decided to make Suppaman a weakling instead. A similar scene is given for Bubibinman; when a fly flew into his curry rice, he made him a weak character out of anger. In a later volume, Toriyama revealed he had created Suppaman for a previous manga that was rejected by Torishima, and added him to Dr. Slump out of pity for the character. The author said he designed the character's younger brother, Syoppaman, to be an "elegant prince" type, which is the exact opposite of Suppaman. Peasuke's habit of asking people for autographs comes from Toriyama himself, who collected those of famous manga artists.

== Main characters ==
=== Arale Norimaki ===
Arale Norimaki (則巻アラレ, Norimaki Arare) is a little girl robot created by Senbei Norimaki. Despite her size, she is unbelievably strong and fast.^{[ch. 1]} She is very naive and lacks common sense, which often causes trouble for the residents of Penguin Village.

=== Senbei Norimaki ===
Senbei Norimaki (則巻千兵衛, Norimaki Senbee) is Penguin Village's goofy and lecherous genius inventor who is able to invent the most brilliant and ridiculous inventions. As a running gag, he imagines his appearance as a handsomer and taller version of himself when he is being serious. He is 28 years old and uses the unusual greeting "N'Cha",^{[ch. 1]} which Arale adopts. After creating Arale, he alternatively tells the village residents that she is either his younger sister or his daughter, depending on the occasion.^{[ch. 1]}

Senbei's name is a pun on the word for a rice cracker (senbei) and with his family name, Norimaki Senbei, it refers to a rice cracker wrapped in nori seaweed. He is voiced by Kenji Utsumi in the first anime and by Yūsaku Yara in the second and Dragon Ball Super. In Dragon Ball, he attempts to fix Son Goku's Dragon Radar. Senbei also makes a brief non-speaking role in the Dragon Ball film The Great Mystical Adventure. In the Funimation English dubs of Dragon Ball and Dragon Ball Super he is voiced by Brice Armstrong and R Bruce Elliot respectively.

=== Akane Kimidori ===
Akane Kimidori (木緑 あかね, Kimidori Akane; "Yellow-green Dark Red") is a rebellious 13-year-old girl who quickly becomes Arale's best friend.^{[ch. 2, 9]} She often plays pranks on Senbei who considers her a bad influence on Arale. She starts dating Tsukutsun Tsun late in the series,^{[ch. 215]} and a look ten years into the future shows they got married.^{[ch. 200]} Akane is voiced by Kazuko Sugiyama in the first anime and by Hiroko Konishi in the second. She has a brief appearance in the Dragon Ball series. In the Funimation English dub of Dragon Ball she is voiced by Laura Bailey.

=== Taro Soramame ===
Taro Soramame (空豆タロウ, Soramame Tarō; "Broad bean" + common male name "Tarō") is Arale's older "bad boy" friend at school. The 15-year-old is usually seen smoking cigarettes and trying to act "cool."^{[ch. 2, 9]} After graduating from high school, he becomes a police officer.^{[ch. 223]} He starts dating Tsururin Tsun,^{[ch. 127]} whom he eventually marries ten years in the future.^{[ch. 200]} Taro is voiced by Toshio Furukawa in the first anime and by Shinichirō Ōta in the second. He briefly appears in Dragon Ball, shown on a date with Tsururin. In the Funimation English dub of Dragon Ball he is voiced by Eric Vale.

=== Peasuke Soramame ===
Peasuke Soramame (空豆ピースケ, Soramame Piisuke; "Broad bean Pea" + common male name ending) is Arale and Akane's classmate and Taro's little brother who always wears an animal hat. He develops a crush on a younger but taller girl named Hiyoko,^{[ch. 63]} whom he eventually marries and has a child with ten years in the future.^{[ch. 200]} He is voiced by Naomi Jinbo in the first anime and by Megumi Urawa in the second. He makes a brief appearance in Dragon Ball. In the Funimation English dub of Dragon Ball he is voiced by Sonny Strait.

=== Gatchan ===
Gatchan (ガッちゃん), full name Gajira Norimaki (則巻ガジラ, Norimaki Gajira), is a green-haired, cherub-like creature with wings, hatched from an egg brought home by Senbei from a time traveling trip to the Stone Age.^{[ch. 11]} Gatchan eats almost anything, rubber being the only exception, and particularly seems to like metal.^{[ch. 101]} It can also shoot rays from its antennae.^{[ch. 27]} Gatchan speaks in its own language, which consists primarily of sounds like "koo pee pee" that Arale (and later, Turbo) somehow seem to understand. One day, after going on an eating-spree, Gatchan spins a cocoon around itself and when it emerges two weeks later, it has split into two.^{[ch. 138]} It is eventually revealed that Gatchan is actually an angel sent by Kami-sama to destroy the corrupt human civilization.^{[ch. 206]}

Arale named Gajira from a combination of the names Gamera and Gojira, the latter is known as Godzilla in the West, hence Gatchan is known as "Gadzilla" in the English version of the manga (although it is occasionally referred to as Gajira or "Gazira").^{[ch. 12]} Gatchan is voiced by Seiko Nakano in the first anime, by Chie Sawaguchi in the second, and by Kumiko Nishihara in Dragon Ball Super. Both Gatchans appear in Dragon Ball and the Dragon Ball movie, The Great Mystical Adventure where they help Arale fight Taopaipai. In the Funimation English dub of Dragon Ball they are voiced by Meredith McCoy.

=== Midori Yamabuki ===
Midori Yamabuki (山吹みどり, Yamabuki Midori; "Orange-yellow Green") is Arale's beautiful teacher and Senbei's dream girl.^{[ch. 2]} After a long period of unrequited love and nervous misunderstandings, Senbei proposes to her while thinking she is out of earshot. Surprisingly, she accepts immediately and they are married in the next manga panel, becoming Midori Norimaki.^{[ch. 104]} Despite Senbei not knowing how kids are made, she becomes pregnant and gives birth to Turbo.^{[ch. 177, 179]} She is 23 years old at the beginning of the series. She is voiced by Mariko Mukai in the first anime and first five films, by Yōko Kawanami in the sixth through ninth films, and by Yuko Minaguchi in the second anime and tenth film. Midori also appears in Dragon Ball. In the Funimation English dub of Dragon Ball she is voiced by Meredith McCoy.

=== Tsukutsun Tsun ===
Tsukutsun Tsun (摘突詰, Tsun Tsukutsun; The sound of poking something (such as feces)) is the son of the Chinese Tsun family, who practices kung fu. Although normally not as strong as the powerful Arale or Gatchan, when extremely angry he becomes more powerful than both. Whenever he is touched by a girl he turns into a tiger and cannot change back unless touched by a guy.^{[ch. 124]} He starts dating Akane Kimidori late in the series,^{[ch. 215]} and a look ten years into the future shows they got married.^{[ch. 200]} He is voiced by Shigeru Chiba in the first anime and Ryōtarō Okiayu in the second. He has a brief appearance in the Dragon Ball series. In the Funimation English dub of Dragon Ball he is voiced by Justin Cook.

=== Tsururin Tsun ===
Tsururin Tsun (摘鶴燐, Tsun Tsururin; The sound of something shiny and smooth (such as a bald head)) is the daughter of the family. She has various super powers, such as telekinesis and teleportation.^{[ch. 117]} She starts dating Taro Soramame,^{[ch. 127]} and a look ten years into the future shows that they eventually marry.^{[ch. 200]} She is voiced by Yūko Mita in the first anime and Houko Kuwashima in the second. She briefly appears in Dragon Ball, shown on a date with Taro.

=== Obotchaman ===
Obotchaman (オボッチャマン; "Well-mannered boy raised in a good environment" + man) is a humanoid robot based on Arale's design, with certain "annoying" qualities removed, that was built by Dr. Mashirito to destroy Arale.^{[ch. 153]} Initially named Caramel Man 004 (キャラメルマン4号), he is both extremely polite and well-mannered so Mashirito tells him that Arale and Senbei are trying to take over the world, when that is actually his goal.^{[ch. 153, 155]} However, Obotchaman falls in love with Arale and learns that his creator is the evil one. He ends up moving close to the Norimakis, stealing Suppaman's house for his own,^{[ch. 158]} and befriending Arale and the rest of the cast. Ten years in the future, Obotchaman and Arale eventually marry and have a robotic baby made by Senbei.^{[ch. 199]} He is voiced by Mitsuko Horie in the first anime and by Motoko Kumai in the second. He makes a brief appearance in Dragon Ball but has a slightly larger part in its anime adaptation, where he tries to help General Blue fix his car (unaware that Blue is a bad guy). In the Funimation English dub of Dragon Ball he is voiced by Kent Williams.

=== Turbo Norimaki ===
Turbo Norimaki (則巻ターボ, Norimaki Tābo; "Seaweed-wrapped" Turbo) is Senbei and Midori's infant son, who is nearly killed by aliens and then revived by them, in the process accidentally imbuing him with many super powers including teleportation, flight, and telekinesis.^{[ch. 179, 180, 181]} Consequently, he can also speak and is a genius, the likes of which surpasses even his own father.^{[ch. 182, 183]} In the seventh through ninth Dr. Slump films an older version of him is seen. His name comes from Toriyama's dog at the time, "Turbomaru". He is voiced by Yūko Mita in both anime adaptations and by Mami Matsui in the Dr. Slump films. He appears in Dragon Ball, where he fixes Son Goku's Dragon Radar after Senbei was unable to figure it out. Once Arale defeats General Blue who had taken the Radar, Turbo creates a new Dragon Radar using parts from Senbei's plane. In the Funimation English dub of Dragon Ball he is voiced by Monika Antonelli.

== Supporting characters ==
=== Aoi Kimidori ===
Aoi Kimidori (木緑 葵, Kimidori Aoi; "Tree-green Blue") is Akane's older sister, who works at the local coffee shop, the Coffee Pot. Unlike her younger sister, she is nice and behaved. She is shown to be good friends with Senbei in the beginning of the series, though she always gets his last name wrong. She is also a terrible car driver.^{[ch. 99]} She is 19 at the beginning of the series. She is voiced by Naomi Jinbo in the first anime and by Hiroko Emori in the second. She makes a cameo appearance in Dragon Ball. In the Funimation English dub of Dragon Ball she is voiced by Meredith McCoy.

=== Kurikinton Soramame ===
Kurikinton Soramame (空豆クリキントン, Soramame Kurikinton; "Broad bean Sweet chestnut paste") is the father of the Soramame family and the town barber. He is somewhat perverted – much like Senbei and Tsuruten – but does a much better job of hiding it a majority of the time. He is skilled with a gun and looks similar to Clint Eastwood. He is voiced by Kouji Totani in the first anime and Nobuaki Kanemitsu in the second. He makes a cameo appearance in Dragon Ball.

=== Mame Soramame ===
Mame Soramame (空豆まめ, Soramame Mame; "Broad bean Bean") is Taro and Peasuke's short mother, who wears an animal cap like Peasuke does.^{[ch. 50]} She is also Murasaki Kimidori's older sister.^{[ch. 119]} She is voiced by Yumi Nakatani in the first anime.

=== Tsuruten Tsun ===
Tsuruten Tsun (摘鶴天, Tsun Tsuruten) is the father of the Tsun family from the Chinese village Plub Pah-Tui (鍔北弊（つばぺっぺい）). He built their spaceship, the Reh Tsu Goh (烈津號（れっつごう）; a play on the phrase "let's go") which acts as their house, to take them to the moon, but it is shot down by Arale and crashes right next to the Norimakis' home.^{[ch. 117]} A fellow inventor and an even bigger pervert,^{[ch. 119]} he and Senbei become friends. He is voiced by Hiroshi Ohtake in the first anime and by Kōji Yada in the second. He makes a cameo appearance in Dragon Ball.

=== Tsuntsunodanoteiyugoh Tsun ===
Tsuntsunodanoteiyugoh Tsun (摘詰角田野廷遊豪, Tsun Tsuntsunodanoteiyūgō) is the mother of the family, who also practices kung fu like her son. She tends to beat up her husband when she catches him in acts (or even thoughts) of perversion.^{[ch. 117, 118]} Her name comes from an old marketing jingle of the Japanese bicycle manufacturer Tsunoda. She is voiced by Seiko Nakano in the first anime and by Michie Tomizawa in the second. She makes a cameo appearance in Dragon Ball.

=== Suppaman ===
Suppaman (スッパマン; "Sourman") is a Superman parody from the planet Okakaumeboshi (オカカウメ星; "Planet of Bonito and Umeboshi"), who has no real super powers or sense of justice. He typically "flies around" with his belly on a skateboard, throws grenades, and changes his clothes in a phone booth, eating an umeboshi to transform.^{[ch. 37]} Suppaman works as a TV reporter when in disguise as Kenta Kuraaku (暗悪 健太, Kuraaku Kenta),^{[ch. 23]} which is a Japanese pun on the name Clark Kent. He also has a younger brother, Syoppaman (ショッパマン; lit. 'Saltyman'), who eats shiokara to transform.^{[ch. 174]} In the first anime Suppaman is voiced by Tesshō Genda and by Toru Furuya in the second.

He first appeared in Toriyama's one-shot Tomato the Cutesy Gumshoe as his secret identity Kenta Kuraaku. In Dragon Ball, he attempts to stop General Blue until he sees that Blue can easily destroy a phone booth. Suppaman then gives General Blue directions to Senbei's house and even lets Blue take his car. In the Funimation English dub of Dragon Ball, his name is "Sour Man" and he is voiced by Dameon Clarke.

=== King Nikochan ===
King Nikochan (ニコチャン大王, Nikochan Daiō) is the king of an alien race that is always accompanied by his unnamed glasses-wearing servant. His race have their buttocks on their heads, their nostrils on the tips of their antennae,^{[ch. 29]} and their ears on their feet.^{[ch. 144]} Originally planning to destroy Earth, they become stranded on the planet after Gatchan eats their spaceship.^{[ch. 29]} They continue to appear performing odd jobs for money, while forever longing to acquire a spaceship to return home.^{[ch. 89, 112, 126]} When they finally do reach their small scarcely populated home planet, they find that everyone is forced into farming radishes for an evil crab-like alien, including the King's wife and two sons.^{[ch. 144]} However, thanks to Arale the Nikochans are saved.^{[ch. 145]} King Nikochan speaks in a Central Nagoya dialect, in which a native speaker of the dialect will find distinct from the author's Northern Nagoya dialect. In the anime, he speaks in a false Nagoya dialect. Unlike King Nikochan, his servant seems to be much smarter/sensible than the King and does not speak in Nagoya dialect.

King Nikochan is voiced by Hiroshi Ohtake in the first anime and by Bin Shimada in the second. His servant is voiced by Shigeru Chiba in the first anime and by Ryo Horikawa in the second. King Nikochan and his servant appear in Pola & Roid attacking the title characters until Roid, having read Dr. Slump, disguises Pola as Arale and scares them off. King Nikochan also makes a cameo appearance in Dragon Ball. In its anime adaptation, he has a larger role where he and his servant collect trash on the streets (which he thinks is treasure) and before getting their ship shot down by the police (being mistaken for the Red Ribbon Army). In Funimation's English dub of Dragon Ball, he is voiced by Justin Cook and his servant by Christopher Sabat.

=== Penguin Village Police Force ===
Gala (ガラ, Gara) and Pagos (パゴス, Pagosu) are two patrolmen that constantly have their car destroyed (accidentally) by an excited running Arale. Gala is short and dark skinned and Pagos is tall with a thicker mustache. They first appeared in Toriyama's 1979 one-shot Wonder Island 2, also as policemen, though the setting was entirely different. Gala and Pagos' names appear on a banner attached to a motor scooter they ride together early in the series.^{[ch. 15]} Gala and Pagos were named after the Galápagos Islands. In the first anime Gala is voiced by Isamu Tanonaka and Pagos is voiced by Masaharu Sato. In the second Gala is voiced by Nobuhiko Kazama and Pagos is voiced by Michio Nakao.

Gyaos (ギャオス, Gyaosu) is the short, balding police chief with thick sideburns connecting to his mustache. Like Gala and Pagos, his first appearance was in Wonder Island 2. He is voiced by Kouji Totani in the first anime and by Bin Shimada in the second. Polly Buckets (ポリー·バケッツ, Porī Bakettsu) is the uzi-toting female cop. She is considered the most dangerous because of her tendency to be trigger-happy. Despite this, her male co-workers always forgive her because she is beautiful.^{[ch. 22]} Her name was only given as an answer to one of the special bonus quizzes found in one of the manga's tankōbon edition. Her name is derived from the Japanese abbreviation "poribaketsu" (lit. "polyethylene bucket"). She is voiced by Toshiko Fujita in the first anime and by Masako Katsuki in the second. In the Funimation English dub of Dragon Ball she is voiced by Laurie Steele. Drop-kun (ドロップくん, Doroppu-kun) is an officer that is never seen without a slingshot or his Stormtrooper helmet on. His name was only given in the fanbook Dr. Slump Special 1981. Charmy Yamada (チャーミー山田, Chāmī Yamada) is an overly dedicated Metropolis Island cop who joins the force late in the series. He suffers from mysophobia and is very skilled at riding his dirtbike.^{[ch. 228, 229]} He is voiced by Ryō Horikawa in the first anime.

=== Kinoko Sarada ===
Kinoko Sarada (皿田きのこ, Sarada Kinoko; "Salad Mushroom") is a toddler who spends her days riding her tricycle and laughing at others for not keeping up with fashion.^{[ch. 27]} She lives in a mushroom-shaped house, has a buzz cut bob haircut with two bows in her hair, and wears sunglasses.^{[ch. 57]} In the first anime series she is voiced by Kazuko Sugiyama and by Noriko Uemura in the second. She makes a cameo appearance in Dragon Ball. In The Brief Return of Dr. Slump, she has a younger sister named Lettuce Sarada (皿田レタス, Sarada Retasu).

=== Dr. Mashirito ===
Dr. Mashirito (Dr.マシリト, Dokutā Mashirito) is Senbei's evil mad scientist rival. He attempts to take over the world various times and defeat Arale with his robots he calls Caramel Men (キャラメルマン). Due to constant failed attempts at world domination, he is forced to convert himself into a cyborg; eventually becoming one of his own Caramel Men.^{[ch. 103, 168, 203]} He was modeled after Toriyama's editor at the time, Kazuhiko Torishima, and has the same name but with the syllables reversed.

Dr. Mashirito was voiced by Akio Nojima for the first 37 episodes of the first anime, by Yasuo Yamada in the second film, by Nachi Nozawa from episode 71 to 164 and in the third film, and later by Keiichi Noda from episode 198 to 236. He is voiced by Akira Kamiya in the seventh and ninth movies. In the second anime and Dragon Ball Super he is voiced by Ryōtarō Okiayu. In Dragon Ball Super episode 69, Dr. Mashirito appears as a ghost and reveals that he has used a chemical to gain control over Arale, before later being obliterated by Beerus. In the Funimation dub of Dragon Ball Super he is voiced by Barry Yandell. Dr. Mashirito is a playable character in the video games Jump Super Stars and Jump Ultimate Stars.

=== Karte ===
Karte (カルテ, Karute; "Chart" or "medical records") is a boy from a wealthy family that moves from Metropolis Island to Penguin Village in The Brief Return of Dr. Slump. He plays football, and had done work as a model when living on Metropolis Island. He admires Arale's strength, and eventually falls in love with her.

== Other characters ==
=== Bubibinman ===
Bubibinman (ブビビンマン; "Sound of a fly buzzing" + man) is a superhero-wannabe from Suppaman's planet, who goes to Earth after hearing that Suppaman (whom he perceives as a weakling) had become a hero there due to his flight and superhuman strength.^{[ch. 16]} However, he encounters Arale and Gatchan and feels inferior, and is side-tracked by his fly tendencies and diet. He is voiced by Mugihito in the first anime series. He makes cameo appearances in the Dragon Ball anime and Dragon Ball Super episode 70, voiced by Phil Parsons in the English dub of the latter.

=== Chivil ===
Chivil (チビル, Chibiru) is a small imp from Hell that travels to Penguin Village through the volcano in Mount Flap-Flap (パタパタ山, Patapatayama) to obtain souls, for which he gets paid for.^{[ch. 69, 72]} He eventually finds that he would much rather play with people than kill them (due in no small part to Arale's persistence), though he still takes a shot at it every once in a while. He has a pet dragon named Taxi Dragon (タクシードラゴン) which he rides on to get places. He also has an older witch sister named Morasu (モラス, Morasu; "Witchpee" in Viz's English translation) who flies on a broom and quickly develops crushes on many male members of the main cast one after the other.^{[ch. 77]} Chivil is voiced by Reiko Katsura in the first anime and by Mika Kanai in the second.

=== Dodongadon ===
Dodongadon (ドドンガドン) is a one-eyed alligator-like monster that has two mouths. Dodongadon appears destroying Penguin Village, but gets scared off by Arale. He can shoot a rocket out of its back mouth and is not affected by bullets.^{[ch. 41]} In the sixth film, Dodongadon is revealed to have a mother named Mamandagon who is significantly bigger. He is voiced by Keiko Yamamoto in the sixth film.

=== Donbe ===
Donbe (ドンベ) is an anthropomorphic kitsune who likes to use his shape-shifting abilities to transform into things to scare people and cause mischief, although he becomes friends with Arale after she saves him.^{[ch. 26]} In the anime, he gets a love interest in the female fox named Kitsuneko. He is voiced by Shigeru Chiba in the first anime and by Kappei Yamaguchi in the second. He makes a minor appearance in the Dragon Ball anime.

=== Fly Milk gang ===
The Fly Milk (フライミルク) gang are a trio of bikers. They are led by their overweight boss who tells them to be tough manly men, although their job is to deliver milk.^{[ch. 64]} When his minions displease him, he punishes them by picking his nose and sticking his boogers on their foreheads. Their rivals are the Mosquito Milk (モスキートミルク) trio.^{[ch. 64]} When the milk business goes under, they become "real bikers", although they can only afford a tractor and not motorcycles.^{[ch. 130]} They end up using the tractor to plow fields and start a successful vegetable selling business.

=== Goronbo ===
Goronbo (カミナリ・ゴロンボ, Kaminari Goronbo; "Lightning Goronbo") is the thunder god ogre who lives in the clouds and controls the weather as well as being the weather man.^{[ch. 13]} He has a girlfriend named Pikako. In the first anime he is voiced by Kouji Totani.

=== Hiyoko ===
Hiyoko (ヒヨコ) is Peasuke's much taller girlfriend. She lives in a house that is made out of a giant tree stump and has a little sister named Sparrow (スズメ, Suzume) who rides a magic carpet.^{[ch. 63]} She gets saved by Peasuke from a bug after she was hit by Senbei's Big-Small Ray Gun.^{[ch. 63]} She marries him in the future and they have a child named Poosuke (プースケ).^{[ch. 200]} She is voiced by Saeko Shimazu in the first anime and by Houko Kuwashima in the second.

=== Joe Dunn ===
Joe Dunn (ジョー・ダン) is a bank robber who makes his first appearance running into Arale and Gatchan, while fleeing from police after he mistakenly tried to rob the police station instead of the bank. After witnessing her super strength and Gatchan eats his gun, he runs from them trying to find the police to save himself.^{[ch. 18]} He reappears holding up in the Soramame barbershop using Senbei and Kurikinton as hostages. When Arale shows up he tries to surrender to the police, however, they force him back in because they never get "fun cases like this."^{[ch. 22]} Joe Dunn later hires the Shiverman (びびるマン, Bibiruman) to kill her, but the assassin fails and is trapped in a book by Senbei's Fairy Tale Machine.^{[ch. 62]} The bank robber's name is only given in the anime. He is voiced by Shōzō Iizuka, Masaharu Satō, and Yasuo Tanaka at various points.

=== Kami-sama ===
Kami-sama (神様; "God") is the deity who rules over the galaxy surrounding the Earth and the creator of Gatchan. He is a bald elderly man with a Van Dyke beard and a small star symbol on his forehead. Seeing that Gatchan failed in its mission to destroy the corrupt human civilization (due to Senbei's accidental intervention), Kami-sama resolves to destroy humanity himself.^{[ch. 207]} However, after seeing the life of Penguin Village and how consequently happy his little angels are, he relinquishes both Gatchan and the Earth to their own fates.^{[ch. 208]} Kami-sama was the inspiration for the character of Kame-Sennin from Toriyama's subsequent series Dragon Ball, and both characters were voiced by Kōhei Miyauchi.

=== Kon Kimidori ===
Kon Kimidori (木緑 紺, Kimidori Kon; "Yellow-green Navy-blue") is Akane and Aoi's bespectacled father. During his first appearance he is shown coming to school with Akane cross-dressing due to a prank Akane pulled on him.^{[ch. 40]} He is voiced by Banjou Ginga in the first anime and Hideyuki Tanaka in the second.

=== Murasaki Kimidori ===
Murasaki Kimidori (木緑 紫, Kimidori Murasaki; "Yellow-green Purple") is Akane and Aoi's mother, who is always wiggling her butt and acting bubbly. She is the younger sister of Taro and Peasuke's mother, Mame Soramame.^{[ch. 119]}

=== Daigoro Kurigashira ===
Daigoro Kurigashira (栗頭大五郎, Kurigashira Daigorō; "Chestnut-head Daigoro") is Arale's eighth grade teacher; he starts teaching at Penguin Village High School on her first day there.^{[ch. 116]} He has a huge head which is shaped like a chestnut. (The "kuri" in his name means "chestnut" and "gashira" (kashira) means "head". "Dai" is "big", and "Daigorou" is also the Japanese given name of Takamiyama, a popular former Sumo wrestler from Hawaii.) Initially he is surprised at the odd and stupid characters in the school, but takes teaching them on as a challenge, often giving them "Headbutts of Love" (愛の頭突き, Ai no Zutzuki).^{[ch. 116]} He is voiced by Tetsuo Mizutori in the first anime series and by Nobuo Tobita in the second. He makes a cameo appearance in Dragon Ball and was used as the model of Ryokan Kurita from Eyeshield 21.

=== Momotaro ===
Momotaro (桃太郎), based on the character from Japanese folklore of the same name, is seen occasionally around Penguin Village. Momotaro ends up in Penguin Village after Arale uses Senbei's invention the Fairy Tale Machine to transport her into the story "Momotaro the Peach Boy" where she messes up the story and brings him back into the real world.^{[ch. 34]} He was seen many times before this incident, in non-speaking background roles. In the first anime he is voiced by Naomi Jinbo.

=== Nitro Norimaki ===
Nitro Norimaki (則巻ニトロ) is Senbei and Midori's second child. She is only seen in the original manga briefly during Obotchaman's trip 10 years into the future, between Turbo and an unnamed younger brother, but is featured in the sequel manga series, The Brief Return of Dr. Slump.^{[ch. 199]} She has more recurring appearances in the second anime series and in the seventh, eighth and ninth Dr. Slump films.

=== Koita Ojo ===
Koita Ojo (王城恋太, Ōjō Koita; a slang expression for "[I was] totally perplexed.") is a member of the Ulteeny Force who is called upon for help when the dreadful Dodongadon shows up and starts terrorizing Penguin Village.^{[ch. 41]} He also transforms into the superhero Kintaman (キンタマン).^{[ch. 42]} He belongs to the Uruchora Police Force (ウルチョラ警察隊員, Uruchora Keisatsutai), a parody of the Urutora Keibitai of Ultra Seven.

=== Parzan ===
Parzan (パーザン, Pāzan; "Fool" + zan) is a Tarzan hero wannabe with almost exactly the same face as Suppaman and Bubibinman, who claims to be the king of the jungle. He and Suppaman dislike each other and play tricks on one another.^{[ch. 49]} Parzan originally has a sidekick monkey named Cheeta (のチーター), but fires him for having a bigger penis than himself and replaces him with a large frog whom he gives the same name.^{[ch. 49]} He is voiced by Kouji Totani in the first anime. He makes a minor appearance in the Dragon Ball anime.

=== Poop-Boy ===
Poop-Boy (うんち君, Unchi-kun) is one of several coiled feces (which look much like soft ice cream) that appears occasionally. He tends to have a sense of justice in general, has feet to run around with (in Japanese children's books, a similar character with the same name appears to teach children potty training). He was the first born when Senbei had to go to the bathroom on the side of the road because there was no bathroom around.^{[ch. 178]} He goes on a journey to find where he belongs and makes friends with two other colored poos named Bird-Poop-Boy (すずめのうんちくん; "Sparrow Poop-boy") and Manure-Boy (牛のうんちくん; "Cattle Poop-boy").^{[ch. 178]} He is voiced by Keiko Yamamoto in the original anime and by Chika Sakamoto in the second series. All three of the poos briefly appear in the Dragon Ball anime.

=== Skop ===
Skop (スコップくん, Sukoppu-kun) is an exchange student from Big City Island. At first he is introduced as an extremely smart and serious student that looked down on everyone as idiots, but after seeing that Arale was able to do his homework, he becomes goofy like everyone else in Penguin Village.^{[ch. 60]} Skop has the appearance of Spock from Star Trek and lives in a house which is shaped like the Starship Enterprise. He is voiced by Hideyuki Tanaka in the first anime series.

=== The Sun ===
The Sun (太陽, Taiyō) that sometimes oversleeps for unknown reasons and thus delays dawn, wears sunglasses, eats ice cream and complains about heat. He is voiced by Toshio Furukawa in the first anime and by Shinichirō Ōta in the second. In the Funimation dub of Dragon Ball Super The Sun is voiced by Phil Parsons.

=== Trampire ===
Drampire (ドランパイア, Doranpaia; "Dracula" + "Vampire"), "Trampire" in Viz's English translation, is a sexy vampire that loves blood and money.^{[ch. 54]} She breaks into houses to suck the residents' blood and steal their money. Despite being a monster herself, she is very put off by the strange creatures around Penguin Village. Trampire is later seen working as a part-time grim reaper for Enma and is sent to reap Senbei's soul but ends up getting fired due to Arale's interference.^{[ch. 194, 195]} She is accompanied by a Frankenstein who transforms into a wolfman when he sees the moon. She is voiced by Keiko Han in the first anime. She makes a brief background appearance in the Dragon Ball anime.

=== Komattachan ===
Komattachan (コマッタチャン, Komattachan) is an alien that took over King Nikochan's planet while he was away on Earth. He forced the inhabitants of Planet Nikochan to farm radishes for him, demanding one thousand radishes each month, and punishing them if they were not to his satisfaction. He was defeated by Arale.

=== Dr. Ope ===
Dr. Ope (Dr.オペ, Dokutā Ope; From "operation") is Karute's father who appears in The Brief Return of Dr. Slump. He is extremely wealthy, and is known as the best doctor in the world.

=== Gaze ===
Gaze (ガーゼ, Gāze; "Gauze") is Karute's mother who appears in The Brief Return of Dr. Slump. She is a nurse, and is able to wrap a bandage quicker than any other person in the world.

=== Chinki ===
Chinki (チンキ, Chinki; "Tincture") is Karute's younger sister who appears in The Brief Return of Dr. Slump. She has an IQ of 200, and entered junior high school at the age of three.

=== Akira Toriyama and His Inner Circle ===
Toriyama (トリヤマ) is a self-caricature of the manga's author Akira Toriyama, who is depicted as a mountain-like bird (the name Toriyama means bird mountain), a robot, or a man wearing a surgical mask. As a bird or robot he is voiced by Isamu Tanonaka, and as a human he is voiced by Hideyuki Tanaka.

Kazuhiko Torishima (鳥嶋和彦)
Toriyama's editor and the real-life model for the villainous Dr. Mashirito, known for being a stern taskmaster to the harried Toriyama. He is voiced by Nachi Nozawa, Shigeru Chiba, and Kōji Totani at various points.
Hiswashi (ひすゎし)
Toriyama's first assistant, manga artist and later Ogaki Women's University professor Hisashi Tanaka. He is voiced by Shigeru Chiba.
Matsuyama (松山)
Toriyama's second assistant, illustrator Takashi Matsuyama. He is voiced by Shigeru Chiba.
Makusa (マクサ)
A cook at a takoyaki stall.^{[ch. 87]} The model of this character is Akira Sakuma, a notable game designer and the co-author of Toriyama's book Hetappi Manga Kenkyūjo. He is voiced by Shingo Kanemoto in the first anime.
