= Dragon Ball: Revenge of King Piccolo =

2009 video game

- European cover
- Developer: Media.Vision
- Publisher: Namco Bandai Games (Note: Released under the Bandai brand name outside North America.)
- Series: Dragon Ball
- Platform: Wii
- Release: JP: July 23, 2009; AU: October 15, 2009; NA: October 20, 2009; EU: October 30, 2009
- Genres: Action-adventure, beat 'em up, platform
- Modes: Single-player, multiplayer

Dragon Ball: Revenge of King Piccolo, released in Japan as Dragon Ball: World's Greatest Adventure (ドラゴンボール天下一大冒険, Doragon Bōru Tenkaichi Daibōken), is a video game based on the Dragon Ball franchise. It was developed by Media.Vision and published by Namco Bandai under the Bandai label. It was released in Japan on July 23, 2009, and in other territories in October of that same year.

The game is an arcade style beat'em up and platformer that allows players to take on the role of series protagonist Goku as he fights to stop both the Red Ribbon Army organization and later King Piccolo from collecting the Dragon Balls to complete their plans for world domination.

== Gameplay ==
Players can battle with a basic or mêlée combat system. The two meters on the top left hand corner represent health and ki, while the on right represent zeni just collected.

The game has two styles of gameplay to work with. The Adventure Mode retells the events within both the Red Ribbon Army and early Demon King Piccolo story arcs. In this mode game functions as arcade style beat'em up and platformer, where players in the role of protagonist Goku, run from point A to point B fighting various enemies and bosses and hopping gaps and ledges. Players can use simple and melee type of attacks or use the Kamehameha battle. Each enemy the player takes out will earn them health, powerups, or zeni which can be used in the shop. The game uses a lock-on system which allows players to deliver powerful connecting attacks or to grab a device to cross hard to pass places. The World Tournament lets players battle as one of the available fighter in the Adventure Mode in a World Martial Arts Tournament style VS fighter. Other modes include the shop, where players can buy upgrades, in game music, movies and collectables, and the gallery where player can view their earned collectables, music, and movies.

== Development ==
The game was announced in the May 2009 issue of V Jump magazine. The article featured screenshots revealed that the game would be a platformer, and it would focus on both the Red Ribbon Army and Demon King Piccolo story arcs. Another screenshot demonstrated a few of the features with the Wiimote. A few weeks later Namco Bandai's European branch would issue a statement that they would release the game throughout Europe. It also stated that the game would feature the original series music and voice overs, an unlockable VS mode, and a release date sometime in Autumn.

On June 2, Namco Bandai's US branch issued a statement announcing that they would also be distributing the game as Revenge of King Piccolo throughout North America. It mentioned about the game's controls such as the Wiimote and Nunchuk's ability to issue combos and execute various ki attacks like the Kamehameha, that the game would feature a role-playing element that would let the player use Zeni to buy items to help power-up Goku, and a release date sometime in the Fall season. On September 25, Namco Bandai announced that Revenge of King Piccolo was complete and would be available on October 20.

== Reception ==
Reception

Aggregate score
Aggregator	Score
Metacritic	65/100

Review scores
Publication	Score
GameSpot	5/10
GamesRadar+	2/5
GameZone	6.5/10
IGN	7.4/10
Nintendo World Report	8/10
3DJuegos	7.6/10
Vandal	7.3/10

Dragon Ball: Revenge of King Piccolo received generally mixed reviews from critics. It has a score of 65% on Metacritic. Nintendo World Report awarded it a score of 8 out of 10, saying "Solid games like Dragon Ball Revenge of King Piccolo keep the franchise alive. It manages to integrate multiple game genres into one great title that series fans should enjoy" IGN awarded it a score of 7.4 out of 10, calling it "A simple beat-'em-up that seems perfect for kids but too forgiving and straightforward for die-hards." GameSpot awarded it a score of 5.0 out of 10, saying "Revenge of King Piccolo is more successful as a Dragon Ball primer than as an actual fighting game."

== See also ==
- Dragon Ball: Advanced Adventure
