= Shadow Lady =

Japanese manga series by Masakazu Katsura

- First volume cover
- Genre: Superhero
- Manga
- Written by: Masakazu Katsura
- Published by: Shueisha
- Magazine: V Jump
- Original run: 1992 – 1993
- Manga

one-shot
- Written by: Masakazu Katsura
- Published by: Shueisha
- English publisher: NA: Dark Horse Comics
- Magazine: Weekly Shōnen Jump
- Published: January 10, 1995
- Manga
- Written by: Masakazu Katsura
- Published by: Shueisha
- English publisher: NA: Dark Horse Comics
- Imprint: Jump Comics
- Magazine: Weekly Shōnen Jump
- Original run: July 17, 1995 – January 8, 1996
- Volumes: 3
- icon

Shadow Lady (stylized in all caps) is a Japanese manga series written and illustrated by Masakazu Katsura. A first full-colored version was published in Shueisha's V Jump from 1992 to 1993. A one-shot chapter was published in Shueisha's Weekly Shōnen Jump in 1995. Shadow Lady was then serialized in Weekly Shōnen Jump from July 1995 to January 1996, with its chapters collected in three tankōbon volumes. In North America, the manga was licensed in English by Dark Horse Comics, who published it in 24 issues and later released its three volumes.

== Plot ==
Set in the fictional city of Gray City, a girl named Aimi Komori leads an ordinary, unassuming life as a waitress in a cafe until a small oni named De-Mo attacks her in an alley. Oddly, it brushes eye shadow on her, transforming her into the daring, flirtatious cat burglar "Shadow Lady". To remain on Earth undetected, De-Mo takes a human form and they pass him off as her little brother. Shadow Lady's crimes befuddle the Gray City police, and a detective named Bright Honda takes it upon himself to discover Shadow Lady's true identity. Bright is also an inventor, and uses his inventions to try to apprehend Shadow Lady, but like the regular police's efforts, he too fails continuously. A Demon Police comes to take De-Mo back to the Demon World and execute him, for the crime of giving the magic eyeshadow to a human. In an effort to spare De-Mo's life, Aimi agrees to use her powers as Shadow Lady to retrieve five Demon Stones hidden in the Human World.

== Characters ==
Aimi Komori (小森 アイミ, Komori Aimi) / Shadow Lady (シャドウレディ, Shadō Redi)
Aimi is a mild-mannered, quiet, and shy girl who works as a waitress in Gray City. At night, however, Aimi puts on magic eyeshadow and becomes Shadow Lady, an energetic, flirtatious, and flamboyant cat burglar, and wreaks havoc on Gray City through various acts of burglary, as well as thwarting the police department's attempts to capture her. She has a crush on Bright Honda, which causes her to become very conflicted when she learns that he is in love with Shadow Lady.
De-Mo (デモ, Demo)
A being from the Demon World who created the magic eyeshadow, the source of Shadow Lady's powers. De-Mo left the Demon World on a whim to see if a human could find any use for the magic eyeshadow that he makes, which had become very unpopular in the Demon World. His reason for giving it to Aimi was that she was the first human he came into contact with after arriving on in the Human World. He also is very knowledgeable about the Demon World, and fairly inventive, making numerous gadgets to aid Shadow Lady. He has a perverted streak in him as well. He lives with Aimi, fulfilling the role of a sidekick, and disguises himself as her younger brother.
Bright Honda (本田 ブライト, Honda Buraito)
A detective with the Gray City Police Department. He has a knack for invention, and tries to incorporate his inventions into his police work (albeit fairly ineptly on most occasions). He also is obsessed with discovering Shadow Lady's secret identity, though his reasons for doing so change throughout the course of the series. At first, it appears that his intention in doing is purely to reform her (and use her powers for just causes, as opposed to mischief-making), but in a final confrontation, he alleges that he pursues her because he is in love with her. Before his obsession with Shadow Lady, however, Bright pursued inventing for recreation, and even put on demonstration shows for local children with Lime as a partner and fellow inventor.
Lime Hosokawa (細川 ライム, Hosokawa Raimu) / Spark Girl (スパークガール, Supāku Gāru)
Bright's former inventing partner. During their time together, she also developed a crush on him that he did not reciprocate. An inventor herself, she invents a costume and various gadgets in order to become Spark Girl. As Spark Girl, she attempts to reveal Shadow Lady's secret identity as part of a plot to steal her powers to use them for good, as Bright wanted. Unfortunately, she is thwarted and humiliated by her fight with Shadow Lady. How she came into knowledge about how to reverse Shadow Lady's transformation however, is unclear.
Dory (ドリー, Dorī)
An inspector at the Gray City Police Department. Throughout the series, he actively pursues Shadow Lady, but never succeeds in catching her. The plans he uses as the series moves forward become progressively more ridiculous.

== Publication ==
Shadow Lady, written and illustrated by Masakazu Katsura, was first published with a full-color version in Shueisha's V Jump in 1992. The chapters from this version were included in the third book of Katsura Masakazu Illustrations 4C, released on August 4, 1998. A one-shot chapter was published in Weekly Shōnen Jump on January 10, 1995. The one-shot chapter was later released, alongside three other Katsura's one-shots, in a single volume titled Zetman on July 4, 1995. Shadow Lady was serialized in Weekly Shōnen Jump from July 17, 1995, to January 8, 1996. Its chapters were collected in three tankōbon volumes, released from January 10 to September 4, 1996.

In North America, the manga was published in English by Dark Horse Comics. It first published the series in twenty-four issues, divided in the four story arcs; "Dangerous Love" (seven issues, October 14, 1998 – April 14, 1999); "The Eyes of a Stranger" (five issues, May 12 – September 8, 1999); "The Awakening" (seven issues, October 13, 1999 – April 12, 2000); and "Sudden Death" (five issues, May 10 – September 13, 2000). Dark Horse also published the one-shot chapter on October 11, 2000. Dark Horse Comics published the series' three tankōbon volumes from October 13, 1999, to May 9, 2001.

== Reception ==
In Manga: The Complete Guide, author Jason Thompson wrote: "Shadow Lady shows Masakazu Katsura's dilemma: he wants to draw Batman -style superhero comics, but his readers demand cheesecake in the style of Video Girl Ai and I"s. The resulting compromise—slapstick action with the protagonist's clothes constantly getting ripped to pieces—proves only that Katsura wasn't meant to write comedy, and possibly not action either. The art, however, is beautifully slick, although more cartoony than his other work".
