= List of Zetman chapters =

The manga series Zetman by Masakazu Katsura was first a one-shot from a set of four published between 1989 and 1994 in Shueisha's Weekly Shōnen Jump magazine. Other one-shots compiled were "Shin-no-Shin", "Woman in the Man" and "Shadow Lady". Zetman started serialization as a full-fledged series in the seinen magazine Weekly Young Jump in 2002. The series temporarily ceased its publication, as the last chapter of its "Act 1" was published on July 24, 2014. As of October 2014, the serial chapters were collected into twenty tankōbon, the first one released on November 19, 2003, and the 20th one on October 17, 2014. Outside Japan, the series is licensed by Editorial Ivrea in Argentina, by Grupo Editorial Vid in Mexico, by Star Comics in Italy, by Glénat in Spain, and in France by Tonkam.

== Volumes list ==
No.	Release date	ISBN
1	November 19, 2003	4-08-876529-X
001. 'Jin'; 002. 'Ordinary Life'; 003. 'A Violent Rescue'; 004. 'Awaken'; 005. 'Doctor Kanzaki'; 006. 'Raw Emotion'; 007. 'Sweeper'; 008. 'Warmth'; 009. 'Christmas Eve'; 010. 'Disaster'; 011. 'Despair'; 012. 'Hope'
2	November 19, 2003	4-08-876530-3
013. 'Konoha'; 014. 'From the Sky'; 015. 'Future Dreams'; 016. 'Secret Mobilization'; 017. 'Inside the Crimson Lotus Flower'; 018. 'Concerning Hell'; 019. 'Confrontation'; 020. 'Difference'; 021. 'Hero'; 022. 'Light and Dark'; 023. 'A Good Day'; 024. 'Incomplete'; 025. 'Memory Display'; 026. 'Three Stages'
3	May 19, 2004	4-08-876610-5
027. 'Silent Anger'; 028. 'After That'; 029. '99.25%'; 030. 'New Morning'; 031. 'Amagi Family'; 032. 'Kouga'; 033. 'Brother'; 034. 'Mood That Won't Improve'; 035. 'Trial'; 036. 'Failure'; 037. 'Same as Humans'; 038. 'This Time for Sure'; 039. 'Lonely Heart'; 040. 'Smile'
4	December 17, 2004	4-08-876720-9
041. 'Party'; 042. 'The Next Room'; 043. 'Shaken Warrior'; 044. 'Orgy'; 045. 'Cleanly at the End'; 046. 'The Prattle of Evil'; 047. 'Demise'; 048. 'Transformation'; 049. 'Heartless Person'; 050. 'Answer'; 051. 'Evil's True Face'
5	June 17, 2005	4-08-876808-6
052. 'N-E-T'; 053. 'Jirou'; 054. '16 Years of Darkness'; 055. 'Boundary of Sin'; 056. 'Superhuman'; 057. 'Insect Possession'; 058. 'Escape'; 059. 'Abyss of Death'; 060. 'Resuscitation'
6	December 19, 2005	4-08-876893-0
061. 'The Fallen'; 062. 'The Start'; 063. 'Therapy for the Heart'; 064. 'Problem Child'; 065. 'Removel'; 066. 'Unfortunate'; 067. 'Urgent Situation'; 068. 'Reason to Live'; 069. 'Unusual Figures'; 070. 'Pestilence'
7	July 19, 2006	4-08-877114-1
071. 'Faint Affection'; 072. 'Side Effect'; 073. 'For the Sake of Others'; 074. 'To the Forbidden Place'; 075. 'The Light of Hope'; 076. 'Life with a Mission'; 077. 'Tears'; 078. 'Setup'; 079. 'Sincerity'; 080. 'The Shattered Future'
8	October 19, 2007	978-4-08-877340-7
081. 'Mission'; 082. 'While Dying'; 083. 'Long Shot'; 084. 'The Choice'; 085. 'Alfazs'; 086. 'The Only One'; 087. 'Lost and Found'; 088. 'Magic Medicine'; 089. 'That's Just...'; 090. 'Fighting with Shadows'; 091. 'Fear'; 092. 'Hostages'
9	April 18, 2008	978-4-08-877416-9
093. 'Opening'; 094. 'Initiative'; 095. 'The Third'; 096. 'Kaleidoscope'; 097. 'Back to the Wall'; 098. 'Unbelievable One'; 099. 'Life Boat'; 100. 'Payback'; 101. 'Stake'; 102. 'Ring of Awakening'; 103. 'I Will End Your Life'; 104. 'Gravestone of a Memory'; 105. 'Administering Justice'
10	August 19, 2008	978-4-08-877493-0
106. 'Even So, I Will...'; 107. 'Intersection'; 108. 'The Power of Deceit'; 109. 'Weakpoint'; 110. 'Final Blow'; 111. 'Damaged'; 112. 'A True Hero'; 113. 'Thank You'; 114. 'Resolution'; 115. 'Words of Penitence'; 116. 'People's Smiling Faces'; 117. 'A Rainy Night'; 118. 'Shivering'
11	December 19, 2008	978-4-08-877565-4
119. 'The smile that hides the heart'; 120. 'The road home, A new road'; 121. 'Freeloader'; 122. 'A normal Family'; 123. 'Suspicion'; 124. 'Air Booster'; 125. 'Character Designer'; 126. 'Commission'; 127. 'Seen'; 128. 'Impenetrable Darkness'; 129. 'Dubious Guest'; 130. 'Error'; 131. 'Brat'
12	May 19, 2009	978-4-08-877637-8
132. 'Repulsive Machine'; 133. 'Key Item'; 134. 'Evol, the Organisation'; 135. 'Location Of The Keepsake'; 136. 'One Of Me'; 137. 'Clone Rejection'; 138. 'Equal Power'; 139. 'Waiting One'; 140. 'Links'; 141. 'Cards'; 142. 'Tactition'; 143. 'Vanished Confidence'; 144. 'Suspect'
13	October 19, 2009	978-4-08-877718-4
145. 'After-Effects'; 146. 'Discord'; 147. 'Shibaki's Last Will'; 148. 'It's Not Your Fault'; 149. 'The Jirou Incident'; 150. 'The Past is Always...'; 151. 'What the Hell?'; 152. 'Bird With a Broken Wing'; 153. 'Justice Freak'; 154. 'Kouga & Mayu'; 155. 'Jin & Hanako'; 156. 'TV-Jacked'; 157. 'Declaration of War'; 158. 'Dumbfounded Audience'
14	April 19, 2010	978-4-08-877803-7
159. 'Loss'; 160. 'Criminal Motive'; 161. 'New Stage'; 162. 'Next Generation Evol'; 163. 'Discarded Memories'; 164. 'Plan B'; 165. 'Awakening Gum V2'; 166. 'Haitani's Message'; 167. 'Grand Plan'; 168. 'Bloodlust'; 169. 'Truth and Lies'; 170. 'Conductor of Death'
15	December 17, 2010	978-4-08-879080-0
171. 'Fatality'; 172. 'Corpse Rider'; 173. 'The Ugly One'; 174. 'Puppet'; 175. 'Latecomer'; 176. 'Conspiracy of the Dead'; 177. 'The Last Piece'
16	October 19, 2011	978-4-08-879186-9
178. 'Weakling'; 179. 'Equal Power'; 180. 'The Crimson Stake'; 181. 'Corrosive Darkness'; 182. 'The Door to Truth'; 183. 'Why Protect?'
17	March 29, 2012	978-4-08-879292-7
184. 'Statue'; 185. 'The Value of Life'; 186. 'Questioning Resolve'; 187. 'Awakening'; 188. 'The Beast'; 189. 'Lost Heart'; 190. 'Uncertainty'
18	November 19, 2012	978-4-08-879436-5
191. 'Uncertainty and Conviction'; 192. 'Degel'; 193. 'Touching Display'; 194. 'Anvil'; 195. 'Neutralizing Powers'; 196. 'The Limit of Ambition'; 197. 'Escape'; 198. 'Devil or Angel?'; 199. 'Suspicious Suit'; 200. 'Suspicious Suit 2'; 201. 'Undeserving'; 202. 'Talk Time'; 203. 'Strength in Numbers'; 204. 'Black or White'; 205. 'Justice is Here'
19	December 19, 2013	978-4-08-879810-3
206. 'Chaos born from Harmony'; 207. 'The Cruel Truth'; 208. 'Those who Judge - Those who Save'; 209. 'Dark World'; 210. 'You'; 211. 'A Human Existence'; 212. 'Throbbing Left Hand'; 213. 'Birth of a Hero'; 214. 'Nothingness'; 215. 'Friendship and Death'
20	October 17, 2014	978-4-08-890025-4
216. 'Contract'; 217. 'Collision'; 218. 'There is no Kindness There'; 219. 'Friend'; 220. 'According to Plan'; 221. 'The Price of Chaos'; 222. 'Not Human'; 223. 'A Dark Soul'; 224. 'A World Filled with Kindness'; 225. 'Unconfirmed Threat Counter Action Law'; 226. 'ZET'
