= Konatsu Kato =

Japanese actress (born 1999)

- 加藤小夏
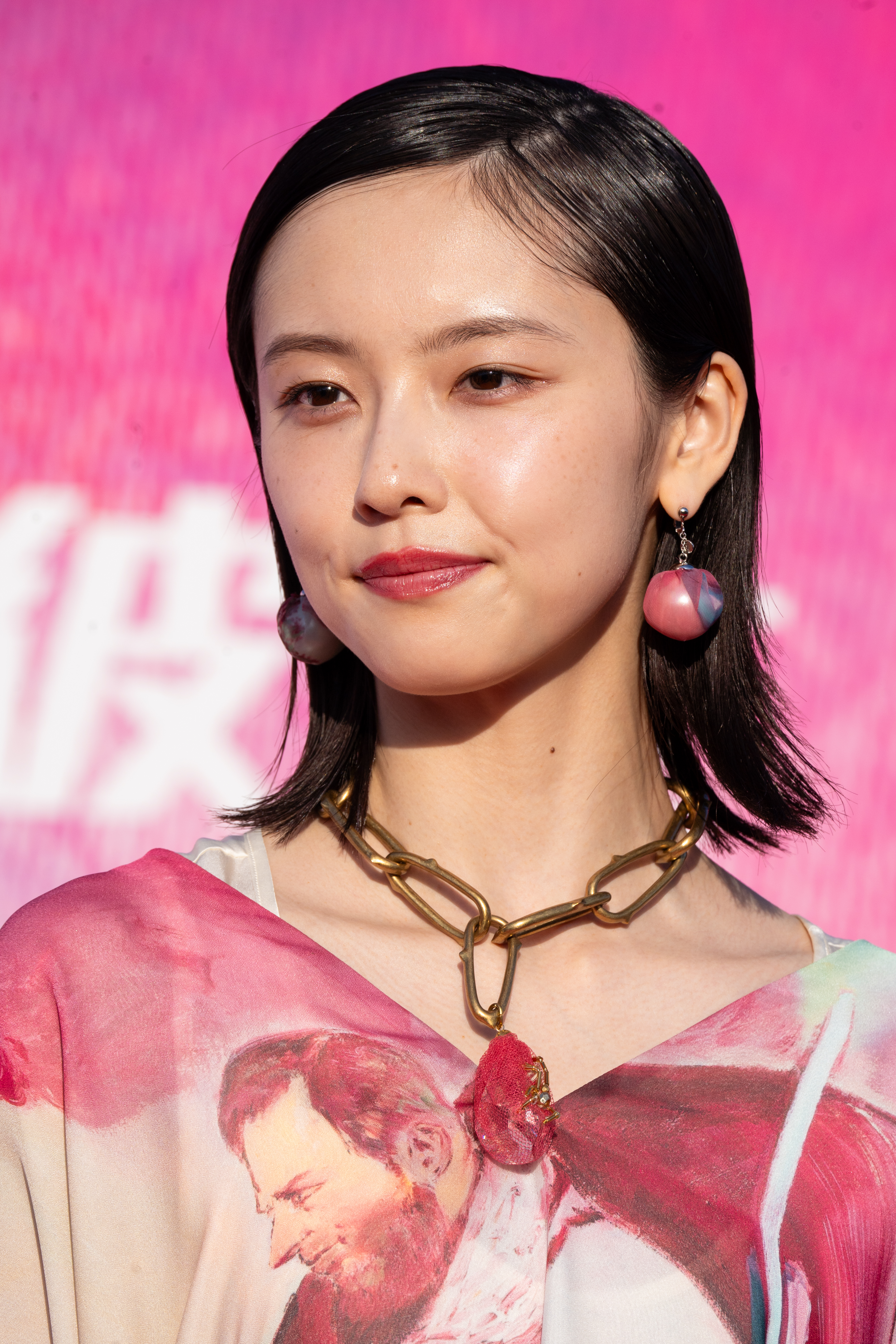
- Kato at the 37th Tokyo International Film Festival in 2024
- Born: June 26, 1999 (age 27); Tokyo, Japan
- Occupations: Actress; model
- Years active: 2014–present
- Agent: (2012–2026)Sun Music Production (2026–now)SuurKiitos
- Notable work: I"s as Aiko Aso; Midnight as Kaede; The 13 Lords of the Shogun as Chiyo; Silent Hill f as Hinako Shimizu
- Height: 164 cm (5 ft 5 in)

Konatsu Kato (加藤小夏, Katō Konatsu; born June 26, 1999) is a Japanese actress and model. She gained international recognition for providing her likeness and voice for Hinako Shimizu in the video game Silent Hill f.

== Biography ==
Konatsu Kato born on 26 June 1999 in Tokyo. She learned to dance at a young age. When she was in the first year of junior high school, she was scouted on Takeshita Street in Harajuku, Tokyo, on her way home from a dance class, and joined her current agency, Sun Music Productions.

In 2018, Kato was introduced in the magazine Pen as one of the buzzworthy women of the year. She quickly became a hot topic on the Internet and among TV station staff as a promotional beauty.

She was selected to play the fourth heroine, Asou Aiko, in I"s, based on the original work by Masakazu Katsura, and after an audition of 700 people to decide the role of the main heroine, marking her first appearance in a serial drama.

In 2021, Kato made her first drama lead role with Yu Takahashi and Sayaka Kakehashi in Uritateya Honeys. In the same year she produced her first apparel brand, ForWe. She also appeared in The 13 Lords of the Shogun, which was her first appearance in a Taiga drama.

In 2024, Apple Studios released the short film, Midnight directed by Takashi Miike. In March, she attended the press premiere took place together with Kento Kaku, and Yukiyoshi Ozawa.

In 2025, Kato provided her likeness and voice for Silent Hill f protagonist Hinako Shimizu. The role would prove mentally taxing for her, saying that she "almost felt my own sanity slipping." She created a YouTube channel to broadcast her playthroughs of Silent Hill f on live streaming. Her first live stream managed to garner over 1.5 million views in only a few days, being positively received by not just Japanese viewers, but also international audiences. The success of the live streams caught Kato by surprise, as she "seriously thought [the stream] would end with an apology press conference." Kato's live streams influenced some of her fellow cast members from Silent Hill f to also do their own live streams of the game.

== Filmography ==
=== Film ===
| Year | Title | Role | Notes | Ref(s) |
|---|---|---|---|---|
| 2016 | The Kodai Family | Saito Jun | | |
| 2020 | Dance, Mita | Koizumi Nina | | |
| 2021 | The Old Woman Skin | Kyoko | Lead role; short film | |
| 2024 | Don't Lose Your Head! | Harunagi | | |
| 2024 | Coffee wa White de | Monaco | Lead role | |
| 2024 | Midnight | Kaede | Short film | |
| 2025 | Blazing Fists | Yukina Tamaki | | |
| 2026 | Homura | Kikyo | | |
| 2027 | Kefi | | | |

=== Television series ===
| Year | Title | Role | Notes | Ref(s) |
|---|---|---|---|---|
| 2018 | A Story to Read on the Day You First Fall in Love | Momo Imai | | |
| 2018 | I"s | Aiko Aso | | |
| 2020 | Baby Boyfriends | Miyuki | | |
| 2020 | Father and Son Underground Idols | Hirari Ato | | |
| 2022 | The 13 Lords of the Shogun | Chise | Taiga drama | |
| 2023 | Nagatan to Ao to: Ichika no Ryōrichō | Ichiga | | |
| 2023 | Fukuoka Love Story | Rio Yamaguchi | | |
| 2023 | Saraba, Yoki Hi | Mori Tamaki | | |
| 2024 | Wing-Man | Aoi Yume | | |
| 2026 | Lunacy | Riku Kiyono | | |
| 2026 | Zenigata Heiji | Orin | Television film | |

=== Video games ===
| Year | Title | Role | Notes | Ref(s) |
|---|---|---|---|---|
| 2025 | Silent Hill f | Hinako Shimizu | Voice and motion capture | |

== Awards and nominations ==
| Year | Award | Category | Work | Result | Ref. |
|---|---|---|---|---|---|
| 2025 | The Game Awards | Best Performance | Silent Hill f | Nominated | |
