= Wing-Man =

Japanese manga series by Masakazu Katsura

- Cover of the first volume

ウイングマン (Uinguman)
- Genre: Science fantasy; Superhero
- Manga
- Written by: Masakazu Katsura
- Published by: Shueisha
- Imprint: Jump Comics
- Magazine: Weekly Shōnen Jump
- Original run: January 4, 1983 – August 27, 1985
- Volumes: 13
- Anime television series

Dream Soldier Wing-Man
- Directed by: Tomoharu Katsumata
- Music by: Keiichi Oku
- Studio: Toei Animation
- Original network: ANN (TV Asahi)
- Original run: February 7, 1984 – February 26, 1985
- Episodes: 47
- Video game
- Developer: TamTam
- Publisher: Enix
- Genre: Visual novel; Adventure game
- Platform: NEC PC-8801, Fujitsu FM-7, Sharp X1, MSX
- Released: 1984
- Television drama
- Directed by: Koichi Sakamoto
- Written by: Yoshitsu Yamada; Masaki Nishigaki; Yuya Nakazono
- Music by: Toshinori Kawamura
- Studio: TV Tokyo; Toei Video Co., Ltd.
- Original network: TXN (TV Tokyo)
- Original run: October 23, 2024 – December 25, 2024
- Episodes: 10

Wing-Man (Japanese: ウイングマン, Hepburn: Uinguman) is a Japanese science fantasy superhero manga series written and illustrated by Masakazu Katsura. It was serialized in Weekly Shōnen Jump from 1983 to 1985, with the chapters collected into 13 tankōbon volumes by Shueisha.

== Synopsis ==
Wing-Man is the story of Kenta Hirono, a fan of superheroes and sentai television shows to the point where he dreams of becoming such a hero himself. To that end, he creates a superhero of his own called "Wingman", and, much to the chagrin of his teachers, acts out his fantasies of being Wingman at school. When Kenta meets Aoi Yume, the beautiful blue-haired princess of an alternate universe called Podreams, he gets his chance to make his fantasy come true, as Aoi carries a book called a Dream Note which can make any dream come true, and Kenta draws a picture of Wingman in the book, allowing him to become Wingman for real. Kenta, Aoi and Kenta's classmate and love interest, Miku Ogawa, team up to save Podreams from the evil dictator Rimel, who wants to use the Dream Note to take over Podreams, while Kenta deals with his conflicting feelings for both of his female compatriots.

== Characters ==
Kenta Hirono (広野健太, Hirono Kenta)
Voiced by: Ryō Horikawa
Played by: Maito Fujioka
Aoi Yume (夢あおい, Yume Aoi)
Voiced by: Yōko Kawanami
Played by: Konatsu Kato
Miku Ogawa (小川美紅, Ogawa Miku)
Voiced by: Naoko Watanabe
Played by: Hina Kikuchi
Momoko Morimoto (森本桃子, Morimoto Momoko)
Voiced by: Yuriko Yamamoto
Played by: Amane Uehara
Kumiko Fuzawa (布沢久美子, Fuzawa Kumiko)
Voiced by: Seiko Nakano
Played by: Hiyori Katada
Kurumi Mimori (美森くるみ, Mimori Kurumi)
Voiced by: Mitsuko Horie
Riro Ousei (桜瀬りろ, Ousei Riro)
Voiced by: Mika Ishizawa
Kenta's Father
Voiced by: Kōji Yada
Played by: Koji Matoba
Kenta's Mother
Voiced by: Mariko Mukai
Played by: Shinobu Nakayama
Masakazu Tonari (戸鳴正和, Tonari Masakazu)
Voiced by: Akie Yasuda
Keiko Matsuoka (松岡ケイ子, Matsuoka Keiko)
Voiced by: Sumi Shimamoto
Principal
Voiced by: Takeshi Aono
Vice Principal
Voiced by: Jōji Yanami
Fukumoto (福本)
Voiced by: Michitaka Kobayashi
Doctor Lark (ドクターラーク)
Voiced by: Sanji Hase (Anime), Tomokazu Seki (Drama)
Rimel (リメル)
Voiced by: Hideyuki Tanaka (Anime), Akio Otsuka (Drama)
Shunichi Kitakura/Keytackler (キータクラー)
Voiced by: Kei Tomiyama
Played by: Mamoru Miyano
Kitamura-sensei (北村先生)
Voiced by: Hideyuki Tanaka
Kurotsu/Shaft (シャフト)
Voiced by: Kaneto Shiozawa (Kōzō Shioya in episode 7)
Doctor Unbalance (ドクターアンバランス)
Voiced by: Hiroshi Ōtake
The Shiva (ザ・シーバ)
Voiced by: Mari Yokō (Anime), Haruka Tomatsu (Drama)
Tatsuo Saito/Nars (ナァス)
Voiced by: Bin Shimada
Ghost Rimel (ゴーストリメル)
Voiced by: Eiji Kanie

== Production ==
Kazuhiko Torishima, the editor who discovered Masakazu Katsura, said he was disappointed when the artist told him he wanted to draw a transforming superhero manga. He explained that science fiction works in television with its special effects, but it does not come across visually in manga. So Torishima proposed making it a school story involving girls and asked him to make the main character more realistic and familiar to readers.

== Media ==
=== Anime ===
The manga was adapted into an anime television series titled Dream Soldier Wing-Man (夢戦士ウイングマン, Yume Senshi Uinguman), produced by Toei Animation and aired from 1984 to 1985. The anime had a total of 47 episodes.

Featuring character designs by Yoshinori Kanemori and intended by Toei Animation to be a strong shōnen title following the female-targeted Ai Shite Knight, Wing-Man marked the first anime adaptation of one of Katsura's works and the debut role of Ryo Horikawa as Kenta. (Katsura himself would later appear as Wing-Man in a live-action adaptation of Video Girl Ai.)

The anime's ending differs from that of the manga, but the manga's ending was dramatized with the anime's voice actors on a drama LP.

=== Video games ===
The manga was adapted into a 1984 visual novel adventure game also titled Dream Soldier Wing-Man. It was developed by TamTam and published by Enix for the NEC PC-8801 and other personal computers. It featured a point-and-click interface, where a cursor is used to interact with on-screen objects, similar to Planet Mephius (1983) and the Famicom version of The Portopia Serial Murder Case (1985).

=== Live-action ===
On September 2, 2024, a live-action television adaptation of Wing-Man was announced. Co-produced by TV Tokyo, Toei Video, and DMM TV, it began airing on TV Tokyo and its affiliates on October 22, 2024, and was available on the DMM TV streaming service starting October 16. Maito Fujioka and Konatsu Kato starred as Kenta Hirono and Aoi Yume respectively with Ultraman, Kamen Rider, and Super Sentai veteran Koichi Sakamoto as the director; "Chang[e]" by Blue Encount was the show's opening theme song. The series ended on December 25, 2024.

To promote the series, Konatsu Kato was featured in a pictorial in her Aoi Yume costume for the release of the 46th issue of Weekly Young Jump, which was released on October 17, 2024.
