= Midnight (2024 film) =

- Directed by: Takashi Miike
- Written by: Yusuke Watanabe
- Based on: Midnight by Osamu Tezuka
- Produced by: Shigeji Maeda; Misako Saka
- Starring: Kento Kaku; Konatsu Kato; Yukiyoshi Ozawa; Takashi Miike
- Narrated by: Akio Otsuka
- Cinematography: Nobuyasu Kita
- Edited by: Naoichirô Sagara
- Music by: Kôji Endô
- Production company: OLM
- Distributed by: Apple
- Release date: March 6, 2024
- Running time: 19 minutes
- Country: Japan
- Language: Japanese

Midnight (ミッドナイト) is a 2024 Japanese short film directed by Takashi Miike and written by Yusuke Watanabe, who based it on Osamu Tezuka's manga series Midnight (1986–1987). It stars Kento Kaku, Konatsu Kato, Yukiyoshi Ozawa, and Miike, with narration by Akio Otsuka.

The film was shot entirely on an iPhone 15 Pro and was released via Apple's YouTube channel on March 6, 2024; however, for undisclosed reasons, the YouTube video was later made private and remains so as of December 2025.

== Plot ==
Midnight is a Tokyo taxi driver who operates during the late hours and offers aid to those in need. He helps a young woman struggling to take over her deceased father's trucking business while facing off against a sinister local gang led by a malevolent boss.

== Cast ==
- Kento Kaku as Midnight
- Konatsu Kato as Kaede
- Yukiyoshi Ozawa as assassin
- Takashi Miike as Kaede's father
- Akio Otsuka as narrator

== Production ==
The film was shot on an iPhone 15 Pro as part of Apple's campaign to encourage people to use their iPhones for filmmaking. Apple Japan later released behind-the-scenes footage of Miike utilizing different iPhone camera features, such as cinematic mode and action mode.

== Release ==
The film was released via Apple's YouTube channel on March 6, 2024. On the day of the film's release, a screening took place with the cast and crew. For undisclosed reasons, the YouTube video was later made private and remains so as of December 2025.

Apple Japan released the film's original soundtrack by composer Kôji Endô on Apple Music. The film also features the song "Midnight Klaxon Baby" by Thee Michelle Gun Elephant, which plays over the closing credits.
