= Silent Hill f =

2025 video game

- Developer: NeoBards Entertainment
- Publisher: Konami Digital Entertainment
- Director: Al Yang
- Producers: Albert Lee; Motoi Okamoto
- Designers: Al Yang; Capra Shih
- Programmers: Owen Chiang; Edward Chen; Rachel Wu
- Artists: Kera; Box Shih
- Writer: Ryukishi07
- Composers: Akira Yamaoka; Kensuke Inage
- Series: Silent Hill
- Engine: Unreal Engine 5
- Platforms: PlayStation 5; Windows; Xbox Series X/S
- Release: September 25, 2025
- Genre: Survival horror
- Mode: Single-player

Silent Hill f (Note: Japanese: サイレントヒル f, Hepburn: Sairento Hiru f) is a 2025 survival horror game developed by NeoBards Entertainment and published by Konami Digital Entertainment. It is a standalone spin-off of the Silent Hill franchise. Set during the 1960s in the fictional Japanese town of Ebisugaoka, it follows high school student Hinako Shimizu as she navigates the town after it is consumed by fog, while solving puzzles and fighting grotesque monsters to survive.

Silent Hill f was released for PlayStation 5, Windows, and Xbox Series X/S on September 25, 2025, following an early access released two days prior for customers who pre-ordered the Deluxe Edition. It received generally positive reviews and sold over 1 million copies in the first day after launch, making it the fastest-selling entry of the series. As of April 2026, Silent Hill f has since sold over 2 million units, 6 months after its release.

== Gameplay ==
A screenshot of combat taking place in the game. Hinako Shimizu uses a metal pipe while facing a Kashimashi.

Silent Hill f strays away from the usual Silent Hill style of gameplay by completely eschewing firearms and gunplay for a soulslike-inspired melee combat system based around dodging and parrying, inflicting light or heavy attacks, and a weapon degradation mechanic first featured in Silent Hill: Origins and Silent Hill: Downpour, where weapons can break with prolonged use. Unlike the aforementioned games, Hinako cannot engage in hand-to-hand combat and must evade the monsters if she does not have a weapon. Hinako is the first playable character since Henry Townshend of Silent Hill 4: The Room to carry neither a flashlight nor an early warning device to aid in detecting monsters.

The game features RPG elements in the form of a three-tier health system that tracks Hinako's health, stamina, and sanity. The former two are drained during combat, while the latter is additionally affected through exploration and puzzle-solving. All can be restored through consumable items—some of which affect the course of the narrative if consumed—or by praying at shrines, which serve as save points and offer the opportunity to convert the different items and consumables in Hinako's inventory into Faith, which either serves as experience points to upgrade Hinako's stats or is consumed to create omamori that grant her randomized boons, both of which can be carried over to subsequent playthroughs via a New Game Plus mode.

== Plot ==
The game follows high school student Shimizu Hinako (Note: The characters' names are listed in Eastern order in the game.) who lives in the rural Japanese town of "Ebisugaoka" during the 1960s. She resents her parents as her mother is subservient to her abusive father, while her older sister Junko has left home after getting married. After an argument with her parents, Hinako meets up with her friends Shu, Rinko, and Sakuko, where Shu gives Hinako red capsules to ease her intense tension headaches. A monster wearing a shiromuku appears, engulfing Ebisugaoka in fog and red spider lilies, which kills Sakuko. Hinako escapes but Ebisugaoka has become overrun by monsters. While avenging Sakuko's death, Hinako loses consciousness and awakens in the Dark Shrine, where she encounters a man called Fox Mask. Despite Fox Mask guiding and caring for her, she is continuously warned by a spirit possessing a doll from her childhood to not trust him.

After awakening in the town, which has become almost entirely deserted, Hinako reunites with Shu and Rinko. As the bridge leading out of town is broken, the three plan to escape through a mountain path behind Shu's house. Throughout their journey, Hinako travels back to the Dark Shrine whenever she loses consciousness or sleeps, and continues to follow Fox Mask while there. Fox Mask convinces Hinako to kill Shu, Rinko, and Sakuko to let go of her childhood. She awakens in Ebisugaoka again and eventually reaches Shu's home alone. When her mother calls and asks her to come home, she overhears Shu and Rinko being attacked. When Hinako returns home, she faces multiple memories of her past, including her relationships with her friends and family, as well as her fear of growing up and getting married. In addition, multiple playthroughs of the game reveal that she is in an arranged marriage with Fox Mask's true identity, Kotoyuki from the Tsuneki's clan. Hinako's identities in Ebisugaoka and the Dark Shrine soon converge when her fox self kills her parents as the shiromuku, while her human self seeks revenge. Her fox self seemingly kills her human self under Junko's orders. As Hinako's marriage ceremony begins in the Dark Shrine, her human self awakens and confronts her fox self.

Silent Hill f has five endings, three of which are only available on New Game Plus:

- "Coming Home to Roost": The only ending available on the first playthrough, Hinako's human self defeats her fox self and she rejects the marriage, but she begins panicking and overdosing on the red capsules. It is later revealed that the events of the game were a psychotic episode induced by the red capsules, and Hinako is a woman in her 20s who is on the run for killing several people at her wedding ceremony.
- "Fox's Wedding": Hinako's human self is destroyed by Fox Mask and Shu tries to stop her wedding to Kotoyuki, confessing to Hinako that he gave her the red capsules to bring her to her senses. Hinako beats Shu in battle, causing Shu to relent and become friends with Kotoyuki. Hinako marries Kotoyuki at the cost of her freedom.
- "The Fox Wets its Tail": Hinako's human self defeats her fox self and she rejects Kotoyuki, who becomes enraged; Hinako defeats him and returns to Ebisugaoka with Shu. A radio broadcast later reveals the whole town was evacuated due to volcanic activity.
- "Ebisugaoka in Silence": Available after completing at least two endings above, Hinako's human and fox selves reconcile. Kotoyuki's ancestor appears, revealing that Kotoyuki was forced to wed Hinako to preserve the fox clan. The spirit possessing Hinako's doll is revealed to be from a rival pantheon that wishes Hinako to remain free, even if she destroys her mind through the use of the red capsules. Both of Hinako's selves defeat Kotoyuki's ancestor and the malevolent spirit, freeing Kotoyuki from his ancestor's possession and lifting the curse on the town. Hinako's selves and Kotoyuki annul their marriage, with both of Hinako's identities returning to Ebisugaoka and Kotoyuki moving away. The two promise that they will meet again in the future to revisit their relationship.
- "The Great Space Invasion!": A humorous "UFO" ending similar to other Silent Hill games, with the art style changing to motion manga.

== Development ==
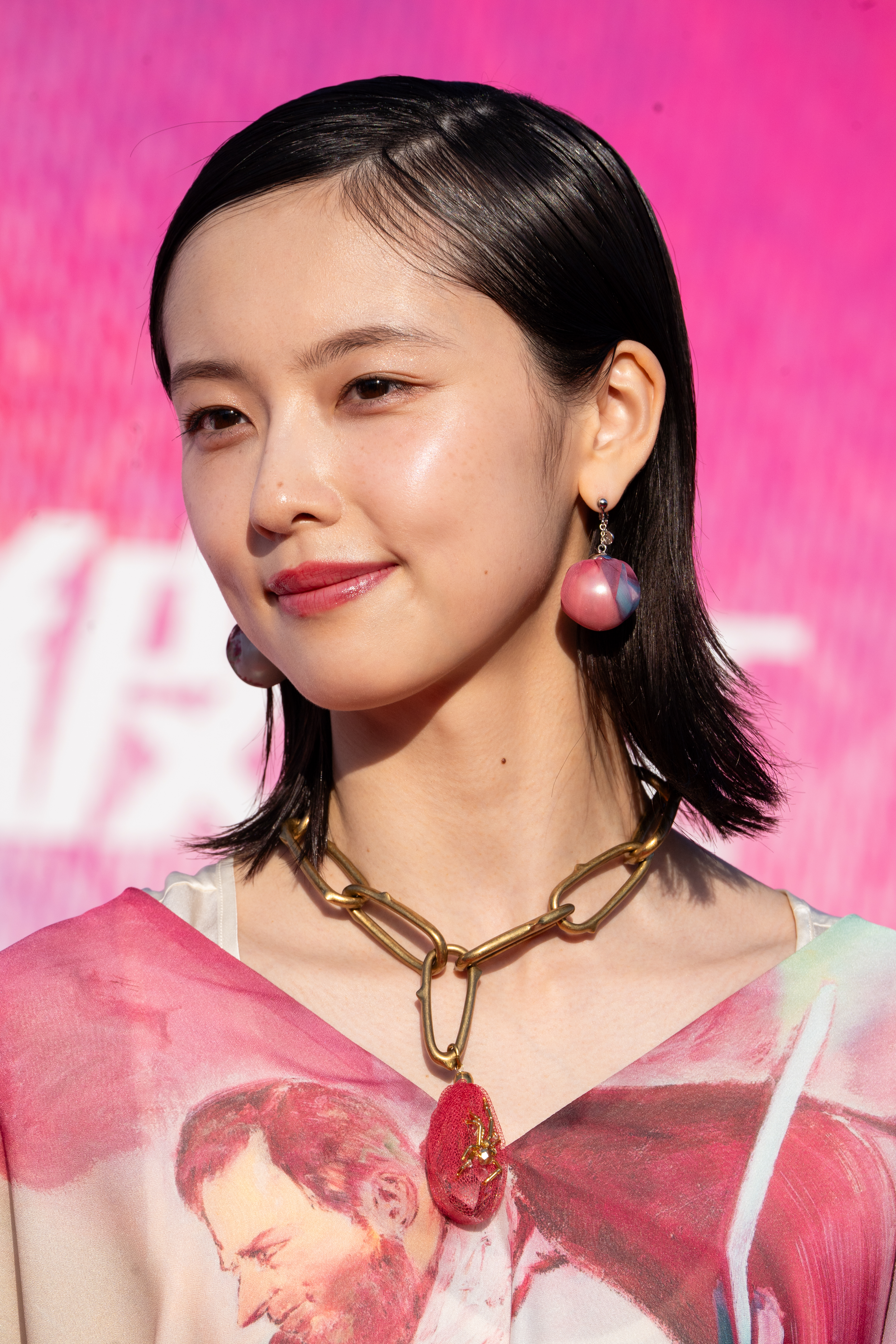
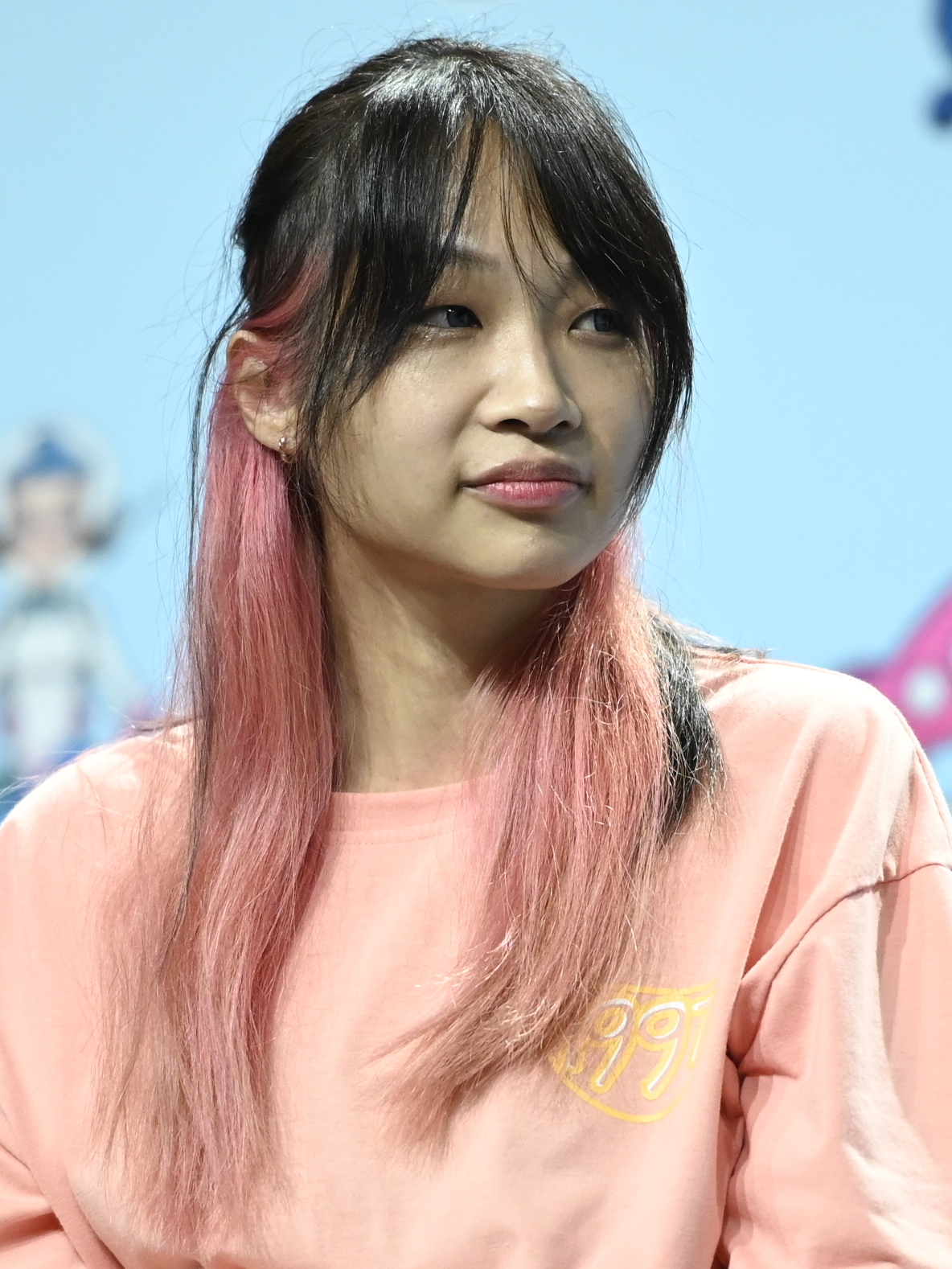
Hinako Shimizu was portrayed and voiced by Konatsu Kato (Japanese) and Suzie Yeung (English).

After the successful remake of Silent Hill 2's release, Konami sought to revive the franchise by focusing on "new" and "independent" projects rather than just remakes. Silent Hill f was built around the concept of "find[ing] the terror in beauty", suggesting that "when something becomes too immensely beautiful and perfect, it becomes deeply unsettling". Konami enlisted writer Ryukishi07, known for his visual novel Higurashi When They Cry, as they believed they needed someone who could "really understand the essence of Japanese horror". Even though the game was conceived as a standalone story, the developers included references to previous Silent Hill games.

While the series originally blended Japanese and Western horror elements, Konami felt it had become overly westernized, diminishing its Japanese influence. Consequently, the team decided to create Silent Hill f as a "100% Japanese horror", emphasizing its Japanese "essence", which they regarded as central to the series despite the story usually taking place in the United States. Shifting the setting from the titular town to Japan posed a challenge, as the developers aimed to maintain the series' core themes of "portraying characters' struggles with the evil within themselves—sin, discontent, frustration, and conflict".

The game's primary setting of Ebisugaoka was inspired by the Kanayama area of Gero, Gifu. Ryukishi07 suggested Kanayama after comparing various locations, saying that its "extremely unique townscape" reflected the passage of time and the way its structures had evolved alongside residents' lifestyles. The team visited Kanayama to photograph modern sites and used reference materials to authentically recreate the 1960s setting. Ryukishi07 noted female characters in the previous Silent Hill games had endured significant suffering. With Silent Hill f, he sought to create a protagonist, Hinako Shimizu, who actively makes her own choices rather than being "pulled along by the story". As he explained, the names of Hinako, Rinko and Sakuko come directly from names of Umineko When They Cry characters. Hinako is portrayed by Konatsu Kato in Japanese and Suzie Yeung in English.

To further highlight the creative process behind the project, Konami and NeoBards released a behind-the-scenes featurette during the Konami Press Start stream, offering insights from key staff such as director Al Yang and senior producer Albert Lee on the game's themes, visual design, and development challenges. The video emphasized NeoBards' focus on blending traditional Japanese horror aesthetics with modern game design, as well as their collaboration with Ryukishi07 and artist kera to realize the world of Silent Hill f.

Artist Kera aimed for a visual style distinct from the "blood-smeared, rusting scenery" of previous installments while retaining a sense of familiarity. She remarked that the most challenging aspect was monster creations, as the team wanted to combine Ryukishi07's vision with Kera's design, creating monsters that would "really infiltrate players' psyches".

In August 2025, Silent Hill f was featured in an extended hands-on preview event for media in Tokyo, where journalists from major media outlets such as IGN, Polygon and GameSpot were invited to play approximately five hours of the game. This marked the first in-depth public showcase of the title's gameplay, atmosphere, and narrative structure.

At the event, representatives from NeoBards Entertainment, including director Al Yang and producer Albert Lee, provided context on the design direction. Yang emphasized the team's goal of introducing "a different kind of action emphasis" compared to previous entries in the series, aiming for a balance between traditional psychological horror and more tactile, strategic combat. He also noted that the game avoids relying on ranged weapons entirely, instead centering gameplay around close-quarters encounters.

Writer Ryukishi07 commented that Silent Hill f explores themes meant to provoke discomfort rooted in emotional and personal trauma. Silent Hill series producer Motoi Okamoto spoke briefly about the game's art direction, one of the core pillars of the new entry, stating that the team set out to merge grotesque horror with natural beauty to deliver a powerful tonal contrast. The team also spoke briefly about the visual inspirations behind the game's protagonist and creature design, describing the aesthetic as a fusion of delicate beauty and rot.

The hands-on reports noted the game's distinct tone and mechanics, with IGN describing it as "a horror game that gets everything right" and Polygon highlighting the tension of resource scarcity and player choice.

=== Music ===
Akira Yamaoka and Kensuke Inage composed the music for the game's Fog World and Otherworld, respectively. Additionally, composers Dai and Xaki, who previously collaborated with Ryukishi07, contributed to the project. Yamaoka focused on infusing the music with the series' Japanese "essence", reflecting his own cultural identity "as much as possible in my own way". Inage stated that he "blend[ed] ancient Japanese court music with ambient echoes", using various techniques to convey "agony, internal conflict, fear, and other emotions". The developers also traveled to Kanayama to record its soundscape.

== Release ==
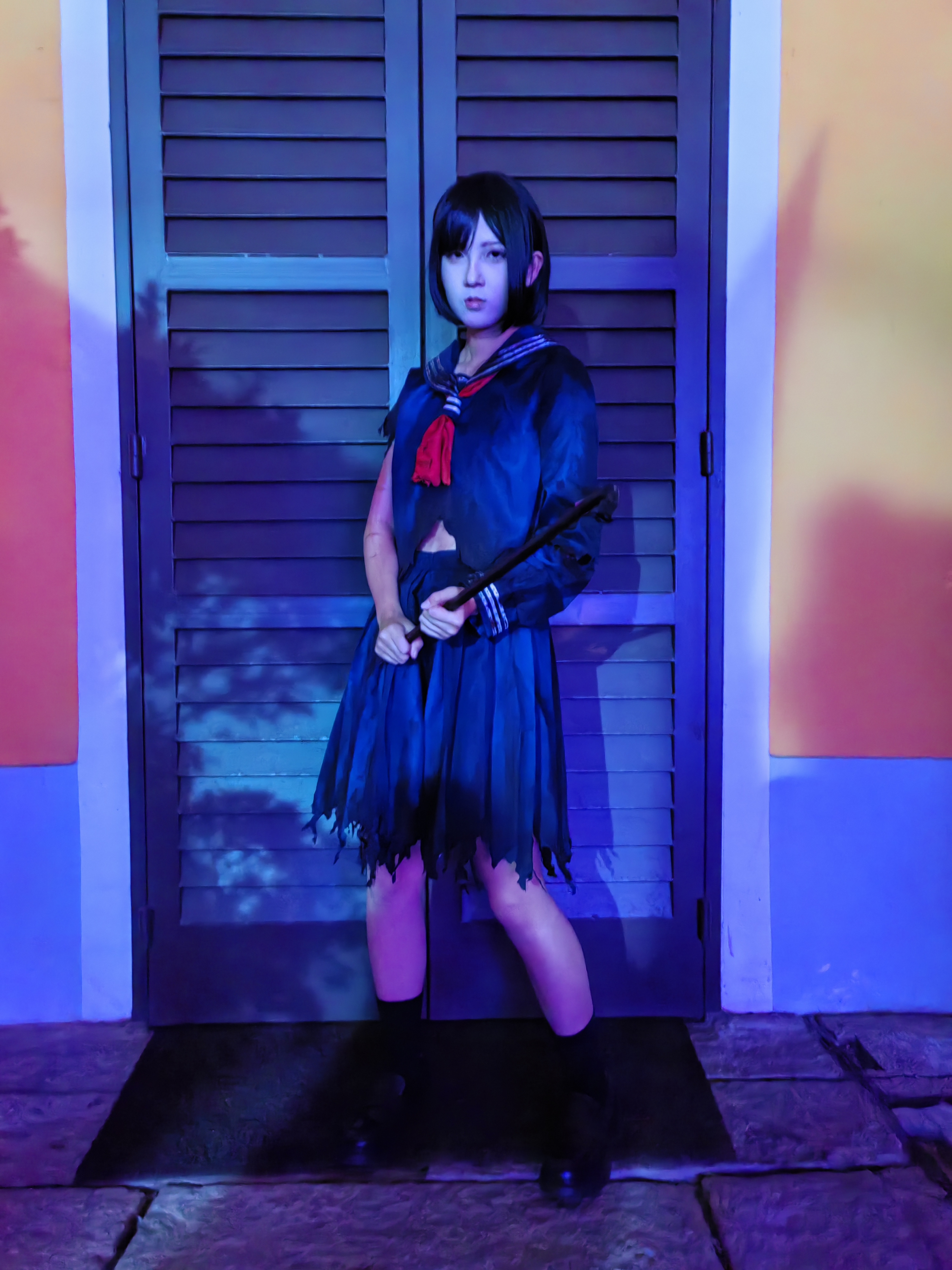
Cosplay of Hinako at the 11th Halloween Albergue SCM in Macau

In February 2021, it was reported that Konami was planning to revive the Silent Hill franchise with multiple third-party studios developing new games. Silent Hill f was officially announced during a livestream in October 2022, alongside other titles. Its reveal trailer debuted at another livestream in March 2025. Konami announced a special edition, which includes cosmetics and digital items such as an artbook and soundtrack. Pre-ordering either the base version or special edition grants bonus cosmetics and in-game items. Additionally, the special edition offers early access to the game two days before its official release. The game was released for PlayStation 5, Windows, and Xbox Series X/S on September 25, 2025.

On March 14, 2025, the game was given a "Refused Classification" rating by the International Age Rating Coalition (IARC) Global Rating Tool, which does not allow it to be sold in Australia. The IARC did not provide a clear reason for the ban. The Australian Classification Board would later clarify that Silent Hill f had not been given a "Refused Classification" rating by the organization and the game's entry on Australia's National Classification Database was removed. An MA 15+ rating was given on March 25, 2025.

On October 7, 2025, the PC version of Silent Hill f was released DRM-free on GOG.com, as part of the platform's 17th anniversary. On October 16, the Silent Hill f soundtrack release for December 17 was cancelled and pre-orders were refunded.

It was announced that a novelization of the game was released on October 30, 2025, by Shiro Kuro and published by Kadokawa Corporation, as well as a collaboration with Aidairo's Toilet-Bound Hanako-kun for Halloween promotion. Following the game's release, video game producer Motoi Okamoto in an interview with Famitsu, stated he wants to see Konami release a new Silent Hill game every year, focusing on global reach, including based on films such as Save the Green Planet! (2003), Nosferatu (1922, 2024), and Death Whisperer trilogy (2023–25).

On March 25, 2026, it was announced that the game will have a manga adaptation with a new ending overseen by Ryukishi07 and Norimitsu Kaihō, it was serialized on Kadokawa's Young Ace Up on April 23, 2026. In September and October 2026, the game has twocollaborations with Shueisha Games' Urban Myth Dissolution Center and Kodansha's hit manga Gachiakuta, ahead of Silent Hill: Townfall and Roverton releases.

== Reception ==
Reception

Aggregate scores
Aggregator	Score
Metacritic	(PS5) 86/100 (Note: Based on 102 reviews) (PC) 85/100 (Note: Based on 40 reviews) (XSXS) 82/100 (Note: Based on 11 reviews)
OpenCritic	88% recommend (Note: Based on 177 reviews)

Review scores
Publication	Score
4Players	8/10
Computer Games Magazine	9.5/10
Destructoid	9.5/10
Digital Trends	4.5/5
Eurogamer	4/5
Famitsu	9/10, 9/10, 9/10, 9/10
Game Informer	7.5/10
GameSpot	9/10
GamesRadar+	4/5
Hardcore Gamer	4/5
IGN	7/10
PC Gamer (US)	90/100
PCGamesN	9/10
Push Square	7/10
Shacknews	9/10
TechRadar	3/5
Video Games Chronicle	4/5
VideoGamer.com	9/10

Silent Hill f received "generally favorable" reviews from critics, according to review aggregator Metacritic. OpenCritic reported that 88% of critics recommended the game. Metacritic regarded Silent Hill f as one of "The 20 Best PlayStation Games of 2025" and reported that critics praised the game's atmosphere, presentation, music, visuals, and Konami's "willingness to try something new".

Hadley Vincent of Destructoid noted that the game "is quintessential Silent Hill carving its own mark—and it's a deep one. The atmosphere is quiet at first—almost peaceful. But it quickly creeps up and shocks you, encompassing you in a winding labyrinth which brilliantly goes hand-in-hand with the twisted narrative and unforgiving monstrosities." Reviewer Tristan Ogilvie from review outlet IGN had praised the game's horror and setting but criticized its combat for being "repetitive." While Eurogamer's Vikki Blake wrote "All the whiny teenage angst is winding [me] up" Blake felt that Silent Hill f was "faintly reminiscent" of Silent Hill's free teaser, The Short Message. The review noted "if it wasn't for Akira Yamaoka et al's score–which is less recognisably Silent Hill than I've ever heard before–I wouldn't have thought Silent Hill f was a Silent Hill game at all. Which is kind of weird. You know. For a Silent Hill game." Jesse Lennox from Digital Trends said it "stands alongside the best the horror genre has to offer. Beyond the locals, creatures, and disturbing imagery, it was the existential theme of self-sacrificing who we are to fit who society dictates we should be that creates the kind of dread that isn't so easy to escape."

=== Sales ===
Silent Hill f had sold over one million units within its first day of release, becoming the fastest-selling game in the Silent Hill series. As of April 2026, Konami officially announced that Silent Hill f became a sleeper hit, having sold over two million units 6 months after its release.

=== Accolades ===
Silent Hill f received an editor's choice award from both Computer Games Magazine and Digital Trends. It had also won the Game of the Year award at the Famitsu Dengeki Game Awards 2026.

Year	Award	Category	Result	Ref.
2025	Golden Joystick Awards	Ultimate Game of the Year	Nominated	
2025	Golden Joystick Awards	Best Storytelling	Nominated	
2025	Golden Joystick Awards	Best Soundtrack	Nominated	
2025	The Game Awards 2025	Best Narrative	Nominated	
2025	The Game Awards 2025	Best Audio Design	Nominated	
2025	The Game Awards 2025	Best Performance (Konatsu Kato)	Nominated	
2026	The Steam Awards 2025	Outstanding Visual Style	Won	
2026	15th New York Game Awards	Big Apple Award for Best Game of the Year	Nominated	
2026	Famitsu & Dengeki Game Awards	Game of the Year	Won	
2026	Famitsu & Dengeki Game Awards	Best MVC	Won	
2026	Famitsu & Dengeki Game Awards	Best Video Game Company (Konami)	Won	
2026	Famitsu & Dengeki Game Awards	Best Performance (Konatsu Kato)	Won	
2026	22nd British Academy Games Awards	Game Beyond Entertainment	Longlisted	
2026	22nd British Academy Games Awards	Performer in a Leading Role (Suzie Yeung)	Longlisted	
2026	2026 Fangoria Chainsaw Awards	Best Video Game	Pending	
