= Astral Chain =

2019 video game

- Icon art by manga artist Masakazu Katsura
- Developer: PlatinumGames
- Publisher: Nintendo
- Directors: Takahisa Taura; Kaori Ando; Makoto Okazaki
- Producers: Eijiro Nishimura; Kenji Saito; Hitoshi Yamagami
- Designer: Sota Kotajima
- Programmer: Katsuhito Shimane
- Artists: Masakazu Katsura; Hajime Kimura
- Writer: Akiteru Naka
- Composers: Satoshi Igarashi; Naofumi Harada; Hitomi Kurokawa
- Platform: Nintendo Switch
- Release: August 30, 2019
- Genres: Action-adventure, hack and slash
- Modes: Single-player, multiplayer

Astral Chain (Note: Japanese: アストラルチェイン, Hepburn: Asutoraru Chein) is a 2019 action-adventure game developed by PlatinumGames and published by Nintendo for the Nintendo Switch. It was directed by Takahisa Taura, who was previously lead game designer for Nier: Automata, under supervision by Devil May Cry and Bayonetta series creator Hideki Kamiya, and character designs from manga artist Masakazu Katsura.

Set in a dystopian future Earth, the game follows the events of a special police task force that protect remnants of humanity from interdimensional creatures and aberrations that invade the planet, with the story centering on the task force's two new twin recruits. Utilizing the titular Astral Chain, the twins restrain and tether the creatures, employing them in combat and investigation, referring to them as Legions. The setting of the game draws heavy inspiration from various cyberpunk manga and anime, while the gameplay combines hack and slash combat with role-playing elements and investigative open-world adventure game sections. The gameplay segments revolve heavily around the simultaneous controlling of two characters; the player character twin and their Legion.

Astral Chain was estimated to have had a five-year long development cycle and follows a slate of previous collaborations between PlatinumGames and Nintendo, with both companies having previously worked together on titles such as The Wonderful 101 and Bayonetta 2. The game was announced February 2019 as a part of that month's Nintendo Direct presentation. Astral Chain received highly positive reviews from critics who praised its dual-character gameplay, world building, presentation, customization, and soundtrack, though it received some criticism for its usage of a silent protagonist. As of December 2022, the game has sold over 1.3 million copies worldwide.

== Gameplay ==
The player character and their Legion in combat, restraining a chimera

Astral Chain is an action-adventure game where the player assumes the role of a detective from the Neuron special task force, who are tasked with solving cases and investigating incidents that take place on the Ark, the game's environment. Exploring the world, questioning non-playable characters, and examining evidence yields clues and logic puzzles that become leads which further the investigation process. During the course of the game, the player will access the Astral Plane, an interdimensional area where they must traverse hazardous terrain, solve puzzles, and battle enemies, similar to that of traditional video game dungeons.

The player is able to summon a tethered familiar known as a Legion, bound by a chain that is the game's namesake. Legions come in various different forms sporting different abilities that are used both for puzzle-solving and combat. These include: a sword-based Legion with swift blade attacks that can be used to sever circuitry and interrupt enemy attacks, an archer Legion that can target weak points and distant switches, a Legion with powerful punches that can move large objects, an axe-based Legion which generates a shield and can destroy breakable objects and enemy shields, and a K9 Legion that can track scents, unearth hidden objects, and also be ridden for added mobility and evasiveness. The player begins the game with the Sword Legion, capturing the other four over the course of the game. Legions can be swapped at any time during battle, and can also be upgraded via experience points and unlockable skills. On top of the player's own health, Legions have their own individual health meter that gradually depletes while they are summoned, and they are also susceptible to enemy attacks, which depletes higher amounts of their health. Their health regenerates automatically when they're not active. If the entirety of a Legion's health is depleted, the player becomes unable to utilize it until it has restored all of its health.

Combat takes place in real-time, both melee and ranged weapons are used to fight enemies, primarily malevolent creatures called chimeras. Similar to the combat dynamics of Capcom's Chaos Legion, the player can summon the Legion during combat in order to have them automatically fight with the player to create combo attacks. The Legion can be manually directed with the right analog stick, allowing the player to position the Legion for more specific maneuvers. Each Legion also has a unique action that allows the player to take direct control over a Legion's signature ability, such as manually aiming and firing projectiles with the Arrow Legion, or using the Arm Legion as protective armor that can hover over hazardous terrain and attack with a flurry of punches. Additional skills include being able to perform powerful health-restorative finishing moves, unchaining a Legion to summon multiple at once, using the Astral Chain that connects the player to the Legion to bind enemies or as an arresting wire on enemies that attempt charging into the player. The player is also able to utilize the chain in order to zip line out of danger through enemy crowds, as well as crossing gaps and bottomless pits between buildings and platforms.

Completing combos, interrupting enemy attacks, restraining enemies, dodging, and deploying a Legion at the correct moment will offer the player a chance to perform a sync attack, requiring the player to press the left trigger at the right instant, similar to a quick time event. Sync attacks can extend combos, trigger special attacks, bind enemies, and help the player recover from a fall. After performing a large number of sync attacks, the player may fuse with their Legion for a short while to recover health and deal large amounts of damage.

The game features four difficulty settings, allowing the player to switch difficulty between each chapter. The highest difficulty is only unlocked for a corresponding chapter once the player has beaten it once. When played on the two highest difficulties, the game ranks the player based on their individual case performance, giving the player an overall ranking at the end of each chapter. On the two lowest difficulties, the player will not be ranked.

Early in the game players unlock the IRIS tool, a heads up display from which they can inspect the environment and search for clues, as well as save their progress, manage the inventory, customize in-game menus, view the level map, and manage orders (benchmarks and photo challenges that reward the player with items, crafting materials, XP, money, and photo filters). Previously completed chapters can be accessed and replayed via the player's desk at the Neuron Headquarters at the beginning of each new chapter. The player can also return to this area to maintain and customize their Legions, customize their character, and interact with other Neuron officers. Consumable items can also be obtained from vendors that can later be used for crafting, health recovery, or combat.

== Plot ==
=== Setting and characters ===
Astral Chain is set in the year 2078, where humanity is on the brink of extinction. The remnants of the human populace have retreated to a megacity, a massive artificial island called the Ark. The world is under attack by lifeforms called chimeras, which are normally invisible, and reside in the Astral Plane, an alternate dimension composed of crystallized data that is uninhabitable to humans. The chimeras cause destruction, drag civilians into the Astral Plane via wormholes called gates, and spread "red matter" that "redshifts" living things, corrupting humans into aberrations. To combat the chimeras and the Astral Plane, the Neuron task force, a division of the Ark's police, is employed. They utilize Legions—subservient chimeras that have been tethered to an officer via a psychic chain—in order to assist with combat and investigation.

The player assumes the role of one of two twin police officers, who join Neuron early into the game as new recruits. The player-selected character, the "Legionis", has a custom first name and identity, whereas their opposite-gender twin is given the name Akira Howard. The two were born to a redshifting woman in the midst of the Pandemic, an outbreak of corruption in Zone 09 of the Ark. After their birth and their mother's death, they were adopted by Maximilian Howard, the captain of Neuron. Other characters include Neuron commander and scientific genius Yoseph Calvert, chief medical officer and scientist Brenda Moreno, veteran officers Alicia Lopez and Jin Wong, who assist the player in the field, Neuron dispatcher and former TV newscaster Olive Espinosa, and Neuron office manager Marie Wentz. The Neuron officers are also assisted by a hacker named Harold "Hal" Clark, who pilots a modified field drone.

=== Story ===
The Legionis and Akira are dispatched to respond to an aberration attack, but are quickly outmatched by chimeras. The twins are saved by Neuron officers Max, Alicia, and Jin, who wield Legions capable of fighting them. Yoseph assigns Legions to the Legionis and Akira, enabling them to repel the chimeras. Afterwards, the twins are formally inducted into Neuron. Their first investigation mission goes awry when the Legionis ends up being pulled into the Astral Plane, causing the rest of the squad to pursue them in through the gate to save them. As prolonged time in the Astral Plane redshifts humans, the Neuron officers grow weak and lose control over their Legions, causing them to break free and go berserk. In the end, only the Legionis is successful in subduing their Legion, gaining a new level of control over it. Max battles the remaining frenzied Legions and sacrifices himself to allow the rest of the squad to escape. Meanwhile, the Legion production facility at the Aegis Research Institute (ARI), a facility responsible for treating redshift and researching the Astral Plane, is attacked and put out of commission. This leaves the Legionis as the only officer with access to a Legion.

The Legionis is sent on further missions to respond to chimera attacks, eventually recapturing the lost Legions in the process. During this time, the twins come into contact with Dr. Jena Anderson, a former pupil of Yoseph's who is instigating chimera attacks and bears a grudge against the UNION, the Ark's ruling government. Akira is critically wounded, saving the Legionis from an attack meant for them, and Jena evades capture. After visiting a comatose but recovering Akira at the ARI, the Legionis finds out from Jena that the circumstances of their birth during the Pandemic nearly twenty years before are the reason why they have such control over their Legion. She then leads them to investigate Zone 09, a zone that most are forbidden from entering or exiting, quarantined after the Pandemic. The Legionis goes undercover and explores Zone 09 with Hal, discovering that UNION developed a drug called Blue Evolve that could allow humans to fight chimeras, which carried the side effect of turning the users into aberrations, causing the Pandemic. After battling one of Jena's chimeric homunculi, they are saved by a recovered Akira, clad in black armor and fighting with a new Legion, their control over it now on par with the Legionis' abilities. Due to entering Zone 09 without permission, the Legionis is jailed for insubordination, and Hal goes into hiding to avoid arrest.

After another wave of chimera attacks occur, Neuron is forced to provisionally release the Legionis to combat them. Jena stages a large scale invasion of the Ark, announcing her intention to save humanity by merging Earth with the Astral Plane, which serves as a collective memory bank of humanity. The skirmish leaves Neuron's headquarters defenseless, allowing Jena to infiltrate it and take Yoseph hostage. The twins arrive to rescue Yoseph, causing Jena to power herself up with Blue Evolve before battling the Legionis. During the battle, the Legionis is fatally wounded and dies. This causes their Legion to merge with them to resurrect them, but the resultant fusion goes berserk, attacking Akira. Jena distracts the transformed Legionis and sacrifices herself in the process, warning them that this is the true form of their Legion's power. Yoseph then calls in the Ravens—a newly created task force of Legion users—and orders them to kill the Legionis, causing them to fall off an overpass.

The Legionis wakes up back in human form, having been rescued by Hal and Olive, and brought into a hiding place in Zone 09. Hal explains that Yoseph has largely replaced Neuron with the Ravens and is actively hunting the Legionis, accusing them of treason. While carrying out a covert rescue operation to rescue Brenda, also a fugitive, from the Ravens, the crew is confronted by Akira, who tries to convince the Legionis to return to Neuron. However, they are ambushed by the Ravens, who reveal themselves to be clones of Akira, who they quickly kill at Yoseph's command. As with the Legionis, Akira is saved from death by their Legion, and their own fusion goes on a rampage. To stop Akira, the Legionis willingly merges with their own Legion and—now in control of their fusion—manages to beat them back into human form.

Wanting to find out and stop Yoseph's plans, the twins stage an assault on the ARI. Suffering a mental breakdown after finding multitudes of more clones there, Akira leaves the Legionis behind. When they catch up, they fight to a stalemate, after which Yoseph appears. He uses the clones as a catalyst to create the ultimate Legion, Noah, and merges himself with it, intending to absorb all remaining life on Earth in order to become a god. Akira, protecting the Legionis, is absorbed into Noah alongside the clones. The Legionis battles Noah, weakening him enough to allow Akira to seize control of Noah's body, which allows the Legionis to destroy Noah at the cost of Akira's life.

Following Noah's destruction, chimera attacks begin to decrease drastically, allowing humans to consider leaving the Ark and reclaiming the rest of Earth. Alicia and Jin put Neuron back together, with Olive as interim commander, and the task force continues to handle the few chimera attacks that still occur on the Ark. A remaining Akira clone is given the original Akira's memories by Brenda using traces found in their Legion, effectively resurrecting them, and the Legionis resolves to keep fighting by their side.

== Development ==
Concept art of the Sword Legion, illustrated by Masakazu Katsura. The design of the Legions went through plenty of trial and error, and were regularly reworked until they settled on a "heroic" look.

The development of Astral Chain preceded the release of Nier: Automata, with PlatinumGames estimating that the game had been in the works for roughly five years between its conceptualizing and eventual release. With the assistance of former Scalebound and PlatinumGames producer Jean Pierre Kellams, the game was pitched to Nintendo after the company requested the development of a new game with high difficulty. Despite comparisons to Scalebound's dual-character gameplay, PlatinumGames producer Atsushi Inaba has explained that the two games are very different in concept, and sees Astral Chain as an evolution of their previous action games. Internally, the company refers to the game as a "synergetic action game". Takahisa Taura was appointed as director due to his previous work on Nier: Automata, and the company's belief that they need to foster multiple directors that can bring a different flavor for each of their individual projects.

Astral Chain was initially envisioned as a fantasy game where the player would utilize magic, however at Nintendo's recommendation the game was changed to a cyberpunk setting as they felt it would be more unique. Taura explained that the game's setting was inspired by various anime such as Ghost in the Shell and Appleseed, as well as the works of Masakazu Katsura, who was hired to be the game's character designer. While the ability to play as male or female was always intended as an option, the game initially did not feature twin protagonists in the project's early stages. The decision to make the lead characters twins came about from ideas based on Katsura's concept sketches for the protagonists. The inclusion of character customization was also done to help the player immerse themselves into the world.

The gameplay of Astral Chain is designed around controlling two characters at once, which Taura has said comprises the core of the game itself, comparing it to the way the "Wicked Weaves" ability is the core of Bayonetta. The developers also took plenty of inspiration from Libble Rabble with the dual-character concept. World building was considered important during development; the developers wanted to showcase the police performing day-to-day tasks and services beyond crime fighting, and built an expanded cast around such to accommodate. Taura noted that the main difference in approach compared to PlatinumGames' work on Nier: Automata was that Astral Chain had its scenario built around the gameplay rather than the other way around.

When asked about the possibility of Astral Chain becoming available on multiple platforms in a February 2020 interview (focused on the then-recently announced Kickstarter campaign for the remastered The Wonderful 101), Inaba stated that "it's too early to say", and that "ultimately, it's Nintendo's call, not [theirs]". Fans had later noted in January 2021 that the game's copyright notice on PlatinumGames' website had changed to show Nintendo having full ownership of the title, despite previous claims that the property was co-owned. Inaba would confirm this change in an interview the very same month, stating Nintendo now have full ownership of the intellectual property, though they were not at liberty to disclose the specifics of the change.

=== Music ===
The score for Astral Chain was primarily written and produced by Satoshi Igarashi, who previously worked on Bayonetta 2. Igarashi revealed that the background music will change genres depending on the mood of the scene. For example, dramatic scenes will use orchestral music, scenes with more tension will start to use more metal music and the calm scenes are more likely to use electronic music.

Nintendo proposed to PlatinumGames the idea of partnering with Avex Group to acquire vocalists for the game's theme songs. William Aoyama, of the Japanese pop group Intersection; and Beverly, who performed the theme song for the 2019 anime adaptation of Fruits Basket; were ultimately picked by Igarashi and Taura to perform vocals on three separate theme songs. The decision of hiring two vocalists was made to represent the game's dual protagonists. The opening theme song called "Savior" plays during the game's opening sequence, which Taura requested be made as an anime opening. "Dark Hero" serves as a featured song within the game, and "The Answer" acts as the ending theme song.

== Reception ==
Reception

Aggregate scores
Aggregator	Score
Metacritic	87/100
OpenCritic	95% recommend

Review scores
Publication	Score
Destructoid	9/10
Edge	9/10
Eurogamer	Essential
Famitsu	37/40
Game Informer	9/10
GameRevolution	4.5/5
GameSpot	8/10
IGN	9/10
Nintendo Life	9/10
Nintendo World Report	8.5/10
USgamer	4/5
Daily News	5/5
Screen Rant	4.5/5

Astral Chain received "generally favorable" reviews from critics, according to review aggregator website Metacritic. Fellow review aggregator OpenCritic assessed that the game received "mighty" approval, being recommended by 95% of critics.

In a non-scored review, Eurogamer review editor Martin Robinson awarded the game with an "Essential" ranking, referring to the game as PlatinumGames' best game to date, citing that it "shines brighter than anything in the studio's past." Steven Petite of IGN praised the combat, commenting that "though Astral Chain lacks a deep combo system, it makes up for that and then some with its roster of Legions". Destructoid reviews director Chris Carter pointed out that while the game has a slightly slow start, he was "completely sold" once the game introduced customization, while also praising the bosses and the game's variety of enemies.

The game received criticism for its use of a silent protagonist. Francesco De Meo of Wccftech concluded that the decision to have a silent protagonist "doesn't really work well in the context of the story, considering the same character is fully voiced if not picked as main character at the beginning of the game"; a sentiment that was echoed by Game Informer and GameSpot. Despite this, the game generally received praise for its side characters and world building. Writing for Polygon, Chris Plante highlighted the game's non-combat side activities that involves the player investigating and performing helpful tasks toward non-player characters, citing that the game is "a deeply human game about a group of people striving to do good—not just on the world-saving level, but on the minute-to-minute level, during a time when the future seems incredibly bleak", concluding by calling the game Nintendo's best new IP since Splatoon.

The game became a target of review-bombing by Metacritic users, primarily for being an exclusive Nintendo Switch game. Fire Emblem: Three Houses, another title also published by Nintendo, was review-bombed at around the same time for similar reasons, with users countering the negative scores on both games with 10/10 scores. The review bombs on both Astral Chain and Fire Emblem: Three Houses were later removed by Metacritic.

=== Sales ===
Astral Chain launched at #1 in the United Kingdom physical charts, #2 in the Japanese physical charts, and #10 in the United States NPD charts for August 2019. The game sold 46,875 physical units within its first three weeks on sale in Japan.

PlatinumGames tweeted a commemorative picture a week after launch, thanking fans for making the game a success. While full sales numbers weren't disclosed at the time, Taura mentioned in an interview with Famitsu that Astral Chain had outperformed the companies' sales expectations.

By March 2020, Astral Chain had sold 1.08 million units. The 2023 CESA Games White Papers revealed that the game had sold 1.33 million units, by December 31, 2022.

=== Awards ===
The game was nominated for "Nintendo Game of the Year", and came in tenth place for "Game of the Year" at the 2019 Edge Awards.

Year	Award	Category	Result	Ref.
2019	2019 Golden Joystick Awards	Nintendo Game of the Year	Nominated	
2019	The Game Awards 2019	Best Action Game	Nominated	
2020	NAVGTR Awards	Animation, Artistic	Nominated	
2020	NAVGTR Awards	Camera Direction in a Game Engine	Nominated	
2020	NAVGTR Awards	Control Design, 3D	Nominated	
2020	NAVGTR Awards	Game, Original Action	Nominated	
2020	NAVGTR Awards	Graphics, Technical	Nominated	
2020	NAVGTR Awards	Lighting/Texturing	Nominated	
2020	NAVGTR Awards	Original Light Mix Score, New IP	Won	
2020	NAVGTR Awards	Song Collection	Nominated	
2020	NAVGTR Awards	Song, Original or Adapted ("Dark Hero")	Nominated	
2020	NAVGTR Awards	Sound Effects	Nominated	
2020	SXSW Gaming Awards	Most Promising New Intellectual Property	Nominated	
2020	SXSW Gaming Awards	Excellence in Design	Nominated	
2020	SXSW Gaming Awards	Excellence in Gameplay	Nominated	
2020	Famitsu Dengeki Game Awards 2019	Best Rookie Game	Nominated	
