= I"s =

Japanese manga series

- Cover of the first manga volume
- Genre: Romantic comedy
- Manga
- Written by: Masakazu Katsura
- Published by: Shueisha
- English publisher: NA: Viz Media
- Imprint: Jump Comics
- Magazine: Weekly Shōnen Jump
- Original run: April 21, 1997 – May 29, 2000
- Volumes: 15
- Original video animation

From I"s
- Directed by: Yōsei Morino
- Produced by: Osamu Koshinaka; Ryūnosuke Tsuno
- Written by: Shigenori Kageyama
- Music by: Torsten Rasch
- Studio: Pierrot (Note: Production assistance for all episodes was provided by Garyū Studio.)
- Licensed by: NA: Viz Media
- Released: December 9, 2002 – March 25, 2003
- Runtime: 29–30 minutes each
- Episodes: 2
- Original video animation

I"s Pure
- Directed by: Mamoru Kanbe
- Produced by: Osamu Koshinaka; Ryūnosuke Tsuno
- Written by: Tetsuya Ōishi
- Music by: Kayō Konishi; Yukio Kondō
- Studio: Arms (Note: Production assistance for all episodes was provided by Pierrot.)
- Licensed by: NA: Viz Media
- Released: November 1, 2005 – July 23, 2006
- Runtime: 28–29 minutes each
- Episodes: 6
- Television drama
- Directed by: Keisuke Toyoshima; Mari Asato
- Music by: Takashi Watanabe
- Original network: SkyPer!
- Original run: December 21, 2018 – April 26, 2019
- Episodes: 13
- icon

I"s (pronounced "Eyes") is a Japanese manga series written and illustrated by Masakazu Katsura. I"s was serialized in Shueisha's Weekly Shōnen Jump from 1997 to 2000, with its chapters collected into 15 tankōbon volumes. It was adapted into a two-episode original video animation (OVA), titled From I"s, in 2002, and a six-part OVA, called I"s Pure, which was released in 2005 and 2006. The manga and both OVAs were licensed in North America by Viz Media. The manga was released from April 2005 to September 2007, while the OVAs were released as a box set in March 2009. By 2008, the I"s manga had over 10 million copies in circulation.

== Plot ==
I"s follows Ichitaka Seto, a high school student who is in love with his classmate Iori Yoshizuki, but is too shy to tell her. Again and again he plans to tell her his true feelings, but each time something (usually a misunderstanding of some kind) gets in the way. Things become even more complicated when Itsuki Akiba returns to Japan; she is a girl Ichitaka was friends with in their childhood before she moved to the United States, and who had a huge crush on him.

== Characters ==
Ichitaka Seto (瀬戸 一貴, Seto Ichitaka)
Voiced by: Takahiro Sakurai, Katsuhito Nomura (Japanese); Darrel Guilbeau (English)
Portrayed by: Amane Okayama
Ichitaka Seto has a generally shy and reserved nature, and, due to misfortunes with girls when he was younger, he has acquired a reflexively defensive posture when dealing with older girls. Thus, he is prone to rude comments when it seems some people are just trying to help, and can place an emotional wall in front of himself when people ask about his feelings. Many complications get in the way of Ichitaka's goal of being with Iori, such as amorous pursuits made towards him by other girls (notably Izumi, who can be seen as being the most assertive in showing her feelings). Regardless, he constantly thinks about Iori and it would seem he would want nothing more than for her to be his girlfriend. Throughout the series he finds himself lost in daydreaming or imagination, and several times, he even drifts off right in front of Iori.
Iori Yoshizuki (葦月 伊織, Yoshizuki Iori)
Voiced by: Kumi Sakuma, Shizuka Ito (Japanese); Erika Ayanami (English)
Portrayed by: Sei Shiraishi
Iori Yoshizuki is prim, proper and friendly. She is a girl who is easy to like and get along with. This generally positive outlook is put to the test from the beginning of the series, which opens on a magazine article featuring Iori in a swimsuit spread. Suddenly, Iori is the center of attention, and she finds it difficult to differentiate whether people (particularly guys) like her for herself or her beauty.
Itsuki Akiba (秋葉 いつき, Akiba Itsuki)
Voiced by: Tamaki Nakanishi, Asuka Nakase (Japanese); Carrie Savage (English)
Portrayed by: Kyoka Shibata
Itsuki Akiba is loud, reckless and shameless, a complete opposite of Iori, including her affinity towards wearing boyish clothing and having a short haircut. Itsuki and Ichitaka had been friends since grade school, with Itsuki (although a year younger) often being an emotional coach to Ichitaka, particularly regarding girls. The two seemed to become closer than friends in their young life, a relationship that was suddenly interrupted when Itsuki moved away to America four years before the series begins. Just as abruptly, Itsuki returns to Ichitaka's life soon after the series starts, now a fully grown young lady, but still with real feelings for Ichitaka. Halfway through the series, she goes back to America to work with a world-renowned sculptor and is further unseen. After she is gone, she seems to occasionally appear in Ichitaka's mind to scold him during his bouts of self-pity, though these manifestations are really just Ichitaka's subconscious trying to tell him something important.
Izumi Isozaki (磯崎 泉, Isozaki Izumi)
Voiced by: Mai Kadowaki (Japanese); Laura Bailey (English)
Portrayed by: Minori Hagiwara
Izumi Isozaki is two years younger than the other characters and is very much like Itsuki Akiba. However, she is not as shy in expressing her emotions, especially her love for Ichitaka Seto. In fact, she announces her love to almost everyone she knows. She is also a fair bit more daring and is quite superstitious when it comes to love. She constantly tails Seto, and on more than one occasion, has tried to seduce Seto to sleep with her in order to prove her love. Izumi persists in attempting to obtain Seto's love and says that she will try whatever it takes to get him to be with her. She is introduced halfway through the manga, where she meets Seto on the beach during their summer vacation, and after that, she discovers that they go to the same school. She falls for Seto after he defends her from her overly-aggressive boyfriend, and tricks him into going on dates throughout the series. She is convinced that he is her soulmate, and is determined for him to become her boyfriend.
Aiko Asō (麻生 藍子, Asō Aiko)
Portrayed by: Konatsu Kato
Although her name does not begin with an "I", the "Ai" from "Aiko" represents an "i" sound in Japanese, indirectly marking her as an "i." She is quite ditzy, scatterbrained, and is prone to losing or misplacing her possessions, but is also very nice, kind, and unbelievably cheerful, even in bad situations. She also has an uncanny resemblance to Iori Yoshizuki, save for a mole under her left eye. Her close resemblance to Iori causes Seto some complications when she is introduced three-quarters of the way through the manga. She, as well as Seto, fall in love with one another at a later point after they meet. Asō realizes this is a potential problem for Seto and decides to move away in order to keep Seto's and Iori's love intact.
One of the series' running gags is the odd similarities between the women who get in the way of Ichitaka being with Iori. Not only do they all have I names (or AI in the case of Aiko Asou), but they all appear very similar in appearance. Izumi looks like Iori when she has long hair and like Itsuki when she has cut it short. Aiko also looks like Iori but this time more of a near perfect double with the exception of a mole on her cheek.
Yasumasa Teratani (寺谷 靖雅, Teratani Yasumasa)
Voiced by: Atsushi Kisaichi, Nobuyuki Kobushi (Japanese); Mike McFarland (English)
Portrayed by: Ku Iijima
Yasumasa Teratani is Ichitaka's best friend who seems to think himself a pro with the opposite gender despite his somewhat nerdy appearance and lack of success with girls. He is often found giving Seto encouragement and good advice. Though sometimes his help is unwarranted and sometimes ends up in a bad situation, he means well with his actions and is bummed when Seto does not succeed. Ichitaka spends a considerable amount of time through the story continuing to ask for advice, but as the story progresses he learns to not rely so heavily on him. He is generally interpreted as well-meaning but is also a jerk and a pervert, and not exactly the smartest person in the series.
Jun Koshinae (越苗 純, Koshinae Jun)
Voiced by: Akira Ishida
Portrayed by: Yuuki Ogoe
Jun Koshinae is a friend from Ichitaka's class. He is first introduced in Volume 4, during a school trip to Kyoto, when he is paired with Iori. At first he appears to be a threat to Ichitaka, for he seems to be in love with Iori, but eventually, it turns out that he is a homosexual and is in love with Higemi-sensei, their teacher. Because Higemi-sensei is paired with Ichitaka, Koshinae requests for a trade, bringing the happy Ichitaka back to his crush. From that point on, Jun becomes one of Ichitaka's best friends, and an important listener when he is not comforted with the advice he got from Teratani. Though he hates physical aggression, he is a very adept martial artist when need be.
Nami Tachiba (Tachiba Nami)
Voiced by: Sanae Kobayashi, Naoko Suzuki (Japanese); Emily Wallace (English)
Portrayed by: Haruka
Nami is a classmate of Ichitaka, Iori, Teratani, and others, and is generally the mood-maker of the group whenever they are all together on a trip, school project, etc. She is very energetic and cheerful and loves to express herself, though her tomboyish and carefree attitude can make others feel awkward at times. She comes from a very rich family, as it is evident halfway through the manga when the group comes over to her house to organize a group project. Some think of her as a slut and a pervert, since she has tried to get people to sleep together and has shown off her body numerous times.
Yuka Morisaki (森崎 祐加, Morisaki Yuka)
Voiced by: Shiho Kawaragi, Yuko Goto (Japanese); Hunter MacKenzie Austin (English)
Portrayed by: Kanoko Sudo
Yuka is another classmate of Ichitaka and Iori, and along with Nami, is one of Iori's closest friends. Though she does not stand out too much among the rest of the group, she seems to be the only one that Iori can talk deeply to about her issues in life. She, to everyone's surprisem develops a crush on Teratani halfway through the manga, though when he ends up rejecting her those feelings turn into that of contempt. She does not exactly hate Ichitaka, but is put off by his timidness. In the end, she supports him all the way. She is pushed into kissing Teratani by accident in the finale leaving both blushing.
Marionette King
Voiced by: Johnny Hildo
A former senior in Ichitaka's high school, he is the main recurring villain of the manga. A sexual deviant, he tries to take advantage of Iori no less than three times throughout the manga with various schemes, but is foiled by Ichitaka every single time. After his unsuccessful first attempt he is expelled from the school, after his second attempt he becomes a drug addict on the verge of insanity, and plays a major role later. "Marionette King" is his Internet handle, and his real name is never mentioned in the manga, although it is later revealed to be Samejima.
Mokichi Kida (木田 茂吉, Kida Mokichi)
Portrayed by: Keisuke Tomita
A classmate of Ichitaka and Iori, and he looks very much like a frog. He is a complete pervert, and when he sees Iori in the Fuwarin commercial, he becomes what can best be described as a "total psycho", believing that he and Iori are destined to be together. He has tried numerous times to sleep with Iori. After high school, he plays a minor part in the entire plot. He appears once or twice afterwards, but beyond that, he is considered a minor character.
Myoko
Ichitaka's first crush. When she found out about his feelings back in sixth grade, she promptly told him to leave her alone, as she thought he was gross. This started Ichitaka's "bad-luck-with-the-ladies-itis", and made him promise with Itsuki that they would get married someday. Myoko often comes back to haunt Ichitaka in the first half of the series through wild daydreams and hallucinations, but this has stopped as Ichitaka's confidence grew.

== Media ==
=== Manga ===
I"s, written and illustrated by Masakazu Katsura, was serialized in the shōnen manga anthology Weekly Shōnen Jump from April 21, 1997, to May 29, 2000. Publisher Shueisha collected the 143 chapters into 15 tankōbon volumes. The manga was licensed in North America by Viz Media, and was released from April 15, 2005, to September 4, 2007. However, Viz censored their releases in order to, as they stated, "fit the criteria of audiences in the U.S.". All edits were done to conceal nudity, specifically characters' breasts, and were made with the approval of Katsura. However, as of the 13th through 15th volumes, the censorship of nudity has ceased. Jason Thompson declared the edits one of "The Greatest Censorship Fails" in manga.

==== Volumes ====
No.	Original release date	Original ISBN	English release date	English ISBN
1	September 4, 1997	4-08-872411-9	April 12, 2005	978-1-59116-952-9
2	November 4, 1997	4-08-872412-7	July 5, 2005	978-1-59116-953-6
3	December 24, 1997	4-08-872506-9	September 6, 2005	978-1-59116-969-7
4	March 4, 1998	4-08-872531-X	November 8, 2005	978-1-4215-0054-6
5	May 1, 1998	4-08-872553-0	January 3, 2006	978-1-4215-0188-8
6	August 4, 1998	4-08-872592-1	March 7, 2006	978-1-4215-0333-2
7	October 2, 1998	4-08-872617-0	May 2, 2006	978-1-4215-0648-7
8	December 3, 1998	4-08-872639-1	July 5, 2006	978-1-4215-0649-4
9	March 4, 1999	4-08-872681-2	September 5, 2006	978-1-4215-0650-0
10	June 3, 1999	4-08-872727-4	November 7, 2006	978-1-4215-0651-7
11	August 4, 1999	4-08-872747-9	January 2, 2007	978-1-4215-0652-4
12	November 4, 1999	4-08-872791-6	March 6, 2007	978-1-4215-1074-3
13	February 2, 2000	4-08-872821-1	May 1, 2007	978-1-4215-1075-0
14	April 4, 2000	4-08-872846-7	July 3, 2007	978-1-4215-1076-7
15	July 4, 2000	4-08-872887-4	September 4, 2007	978-1-4215-1077-4

=== Original video animations ===
The manga was adapted into two original video animation (OVA) series, From I"s in 2002 and I"s Pure, which was released in 2005 and 2006. The OVA generally follows the main plot of the manga, but due to the shorter nature of the OVA, few of the main characters play a less prominent role (for example, Itsuki only lasts three episodes before her departure and Izumi only appears in the beach storyline arc from manga volume 8) and others such as Jun and Aiko are omitted altogether. Due to the missing characters, there are many situations in the OVA that follow the plot in the manga but are played out by different characters. In addition to the manga, Viz Media also licensed both OVA series and released them in North America as a box-set on March 24, 2009. (North American DVD release UPC: 782009240099)

==== From I"s ====
From I"s (フロムアイズ, Furomu Aizu) is the first OVA based on I"s, consisting of two 30-minute episodes, released December 9, 2002, and March 19, 2003, respectively. A box set containing both episodes as well as a making-of documentary on a third DVD, was released on March 25, 2004. The story of From I"s is not an adaptation of a story from the manga, but a new story set during the characters' summer holidays.

==== I"s Pure ====
I"s Pure is the second OVA based on I"s, a 6-episode OVA series animated by ARMS, produced by Pierrot, and released on DVD in Japan by Liverpool. There is also a DVD volume 0 containing promotional and background material. The series is a heavily abridged retelling of the major events in volumes 1 to 15.

Episodes

1. "Au commencement" (French for the beginning; released December 9, 2005)
2. "Souvenir" (French for to remember; released January 27, 2006)
3. "Adieu" (French for goodbye; released February 24, 2006)
4. "Vertige" (French for giddiness; released March 24, 2006)
5. "Déclaration d'amour" (French for declaration of love; released May 26, 2006)
6. "Ensemble" (French for together; released June 23, 2006)

=== Drama ===
A Japanese television drama adaptation aired between December 21, 2018, and April 26, 2019, on SKY PerfecTV!'s SkyPer! channel. It starred Amane Okayama as Ichitaka Seto, and Sei Shiraishi as Iori Yoshizuki. Kyoka Shibata played Itsuki Akiba, and Minori Hagiwara played Izumi Isozaki.

=== Video games ===
A video game titled I"s Pure, based on the OVA series of the same name, was released on November 9, 2006, for the PlayStation 2 in Japan.

Additionally, despite being a romantic dramedy, four characters from I"s (Iori, Itsuki, Ichitaka and Izumi) are featured in Jump Ultimate Stars, a fighting game featuring many characters from popular Shōnen Jump series. None of the I"s characters fight directly, however, and simply serve a support role for other characters.

== Reception ==
By 2008, the I''s manga had over 10 million copies in circulation.
