= Yukiyoshi Ozawa =

Japanese actor (born 1974)

- 小澤 征悦
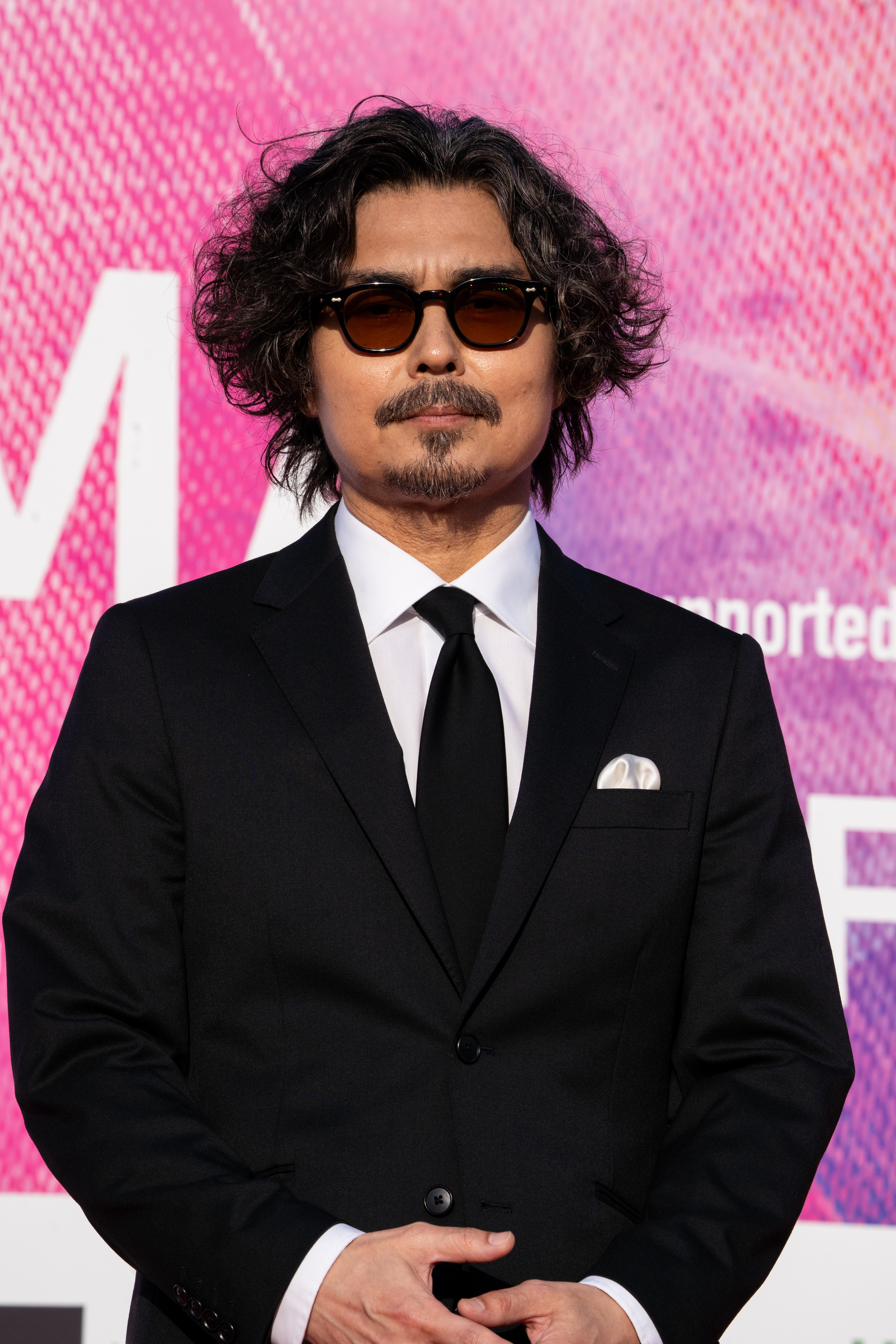
- Ozawa at the Yokohama International Film Festival in 2024
- Born: 6 June 1974 (age 52); San Francisco, California, U.S.
- Citizenship: Japan
- Education: Seijo University
- Occupation: Actor
- Years active: 1998–present
- Agent: Tom company
- Spouse: Maho Kuwako (m. 2021)
- Parents: Seiji Ozawa (father); Miki Irie (mother)
- Relatives: Seira Ozawa (elder sister)
- Website: Official profile

Yukiyoshi Ozawa (小澤 征悦, Ozawa Yukiyoshi; born June 6, 1974) is an American-born Japanese actor. He gained notable fame near the end of 2017 for his involvement in the Long Long Man commercials produced by UHA for their Sakeru Gummy brand, in which he portrayed the titular character.

== Biography ==
He is son of conductor Seiji Ozawa and former model and actress Miki Irie. Essayist Seira Ozawa is his sister, and musician Kenji Ozawa is a cousin. He attended Seijo Gakuen Primary School, Seijo Gakuen Junior High School and High School, and Seijo University. His given name is read as Yukiyoshi but as the kanji for it 征悦 is difficult to read, often incorrectly as Seietsu. On September 1, 2021, he married Maho Kuwako, an announcer at public broadcaster NHK.

== Filmography ==
=== TV dramas ===
Year	Title	Role	Notes	Ref.
1998	Tokugawa Yoshinobu	Okita Sōji	Taiga drama	
2002	Sakura	Keisuke Keiki	Asadora	
2005	Yoshitsune	Minamoto no Yoshinaka	Taiga drama	
2008	Atsuhime	Saigō Takamori	Taiga drama	
2009	Clouds Over the Hill	Natsume Sōseki		
2015	Garasu no Ashi	Masahiro Sawaki		
2015	Prison Officer	Takanori Kato		
2019	Idaten	Yatarō Mishima	Taiga drama	
2019	Afro Tanaka	Shinji Suzuki		
2020	Papa fell in love again	Gorō Yamashita		
2022	New Nobunaga Chronicle: High School Is a Battlefield	Ieyasu Tokugawa		
2024	Acma: Game	Inoru Hoshin		
2025	Totto no Ketsuraku Seishun-ki	Moritsuna Kuroyanagi	Television film	

=== Films ===
Year	Title	Role	Notes	Ref.
2004	The Hidden Blade	Yaichirô Hazama		
2015	Joker Game	Kamenaga		
2020	Not Quite Dead Yet	Watabe		
2020	Flight on the Water	Miyamoto		
2022	Kappei	Hideo		
2022	Kingdom 2: Far and Away	Wu Qing		
2023	One Last Bloom	Tatsumi		
2024	Midnight	Assassin	Short film	
2024	Angry Squad: The Civil Servant and the Seven Swindlers	Tachibana		
2025	Sham	Yoshifumi Maemura		
2025	Beethoven Fabrication	Nikolaus Johann van Beethoven		
2025	One Last Throw	Hirohisa Kagiyama		
2026	It's All Bananas!			
2026	Part-time Death Angel	Amano		

=== Dubbing ===
- The King's Man, Duke of Oxford (Ralph Fiennes)
