= Masakazu Katsura =

Japanese manga artist (born 1962)

Masakazu Katsura 桂 正和
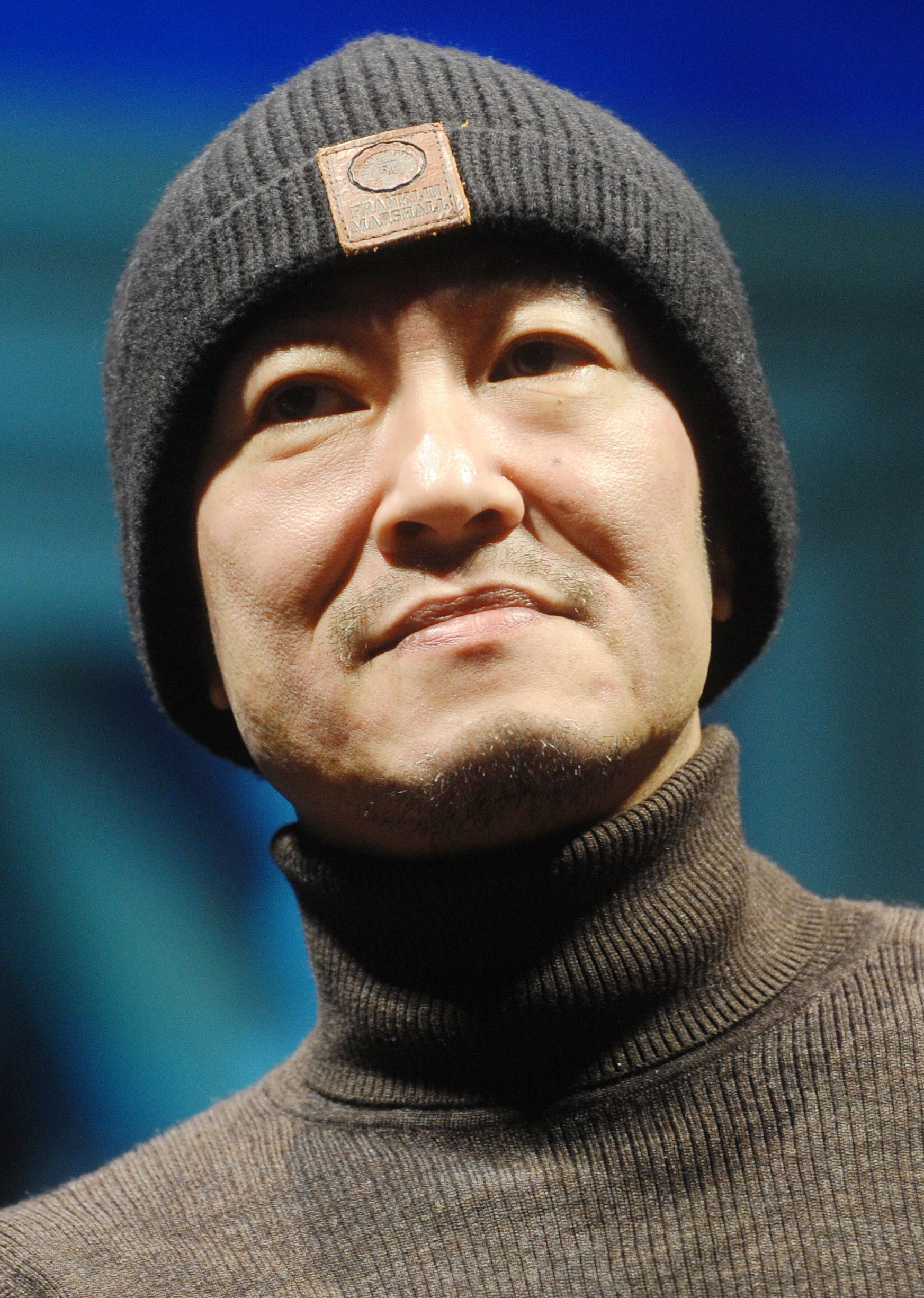
- Katsura at Lucca Comics & Games 2014
- Born: December 10, 1962 (age 63) Fukui Prefecture, Japan
- Areas: Manga artist, artist, character designer
- Notable works: Wing-Man; Video Girl Ai; I"s; Zetman
- Awards: Tezuka Award (1980, 1981)

Masakazu Katsura (Japanese: 桂 正和, Hepburn: Katsura Masakazu; born December 10, 1962) is a Japanese manga artist, known for hero and romance series. His works include Wing-Man (1983–1985), Video Girl Ai (1989–1992), I"s (1997–1999), and Zetman (2002–2014). He has also worked as a character designer for Iria: Zeiram the Animation, Tiger & Bunny and Garo: Crimson Moon, as well as the video game Astral Chain.

== Career ==
Masakazu Katsura was born in Fukui Prefecture in 1962, but spent his childhood in the Gifu and Chiba Prefectures. He has loved drawing since the age of three, specializing in landscapes, and won medals for his oil paintings in middle school. In elementary school, he was obsessed with hero television shows like Ultraman and Kamen Rider. Katsura had no interest in manga until his second year of middle school, when he learned of Weekly Shōnen Jump's Tezuka Award contest. Wanting the prize money so he could buy a National stereo, he bought Osamu Tezuka's How to Draw Manga and gradually all the expensive drawing equipment. By his second year of high school, he had been rejected from about three contests and was submitting 100-page manga to Weekly Shōnen Magazine.

At the end of his second year of high school, Weekly Shōnen Jump editor Kazuhiko Torishima saw one of Katsura's rejected works in a scrap box and called him. Torishima latter said he was particularly moved by the expressiveness in the faces of the artist's characters, remarking that it was as if "they were looking at us, the readers". At the same time, Katsura's story "Tsubasa" won an honorable mention at the Tezuka Award in 1980. After an in-person meeting, Torishima told him to draw a love comedy; the resulting work, "Tenkosei wa Hensosei?!", was runner-up at the Tezuka Award. After this, Torishima visited Katsura's parents, as his father was strongly against a career in art, to ask them to allow their son to attend a vocational school so he could become a professional manga artist. Katsura attended the Asagaya College of Art and Design, but dropped out when he began his first serial.

Katsura's first serialized manga was Wing-Man, which ran in Weekly Shōnen Jump from 1983 to 1985. Torishima later said that he could not relax until the first collected volume was released, because it meant he had fulfilled his promise to Katsura's parents. It was adapted into a television anime series, and received a live-action television adaptation 40 years later.

Katsura's next hit was Video Girl Ai, a science fiction romance series published in Weekly Shōnen Jump from 1989 to 1992. He said that his assistant at the time drew detailed backgrounds, and this led to him adapting a realistic art style. He also stated his belief that sci-fi needs to be realistic; "If the scenery isn't rendered convincingly, then strange things won't be perceived as strange." The manga has been adapted into an original video animation and a live-action film and has been published in North America. Katsura performed as a vocalist on the songs "Tomorrow Will Be Tomorrow" and "Unseen Dream" from the two soundtracks for the OVA. He had a small acting role in the live-action adaptation.

Toshimasa Takahashi, then editor-in-chief of Weekly Shōnen Jump, told Katsura to draw a "contemporary drama". This led to DNA², which was serialized in the magazine from 1993 to 1994. It was adapted into an anime television series that was concluded with a short OVA, both of which were released in North America.

The romance series I"s ran in Weekly Shōnen Jump from 1997 to 2000. With the work, Katsura said he was asked to transpose how shōjo manga is often told from the first-person perspective of a girl into a shōnen manga. The series was adapted into two OVAs and a live-action television drama. Both the manga and anime were released in North America.

In 2008, Katsura collaborated with his friend Akira Toriyama for the Jump Square one-shot Sachie-chan Good!!. They worked together again in 2009, for the three-chapter one-shot Jiya in Weekly Young Jump. Also in 2008, Katsura did a design illustration of the Batman costume for Bandai's "Movie Realization" action figure line, basing it on the costume used in the film The Dark Knight.

In 2020, Katsura worked with author Erika Yoshida for the one-shot love story "Okaeri", to conclude Weekly Young Jump's 40th anniversary celebrations.

Genkosha will publish the art book Positive Sensitive Hips: Katsura Masakazu o Shiri Gashū on December 10, 2026. It compiles 120 illustrations of female buttocks, including both completely original pieces and those based on models, such as Enako, Mariya Ise and Moe Iori.

== Style ==
Katsura's manga series typically last about two or three years. He said he never worried about creating a flagship title that would continue for decades, "After finishing [one], I'd play around for about a year." The artist used a baseball analogy to describe his level of success, stating that, while he has hit a bunch of solo home runs, he has never hit a grand slam. "Everyone's favorite series is going to be different depending on what generation they come from." Throughout his career, Katsura has drawn hero and romance series. He a big fan of tokusatsu hero works, and said that even in his romance titles, the hero element naturally comes out as the protagonist puts his life on the line to protect the heroine. Katsura cited Yoshikazu Yasuhiko as an influence on his character art style through anime such as Combattler V, and suggested Hiroshi Asuna is the reason his art has a "bit of a gloomy vibe" to it. He also said that reading shōjo manga helped him when he was not keen on drawing a romance series. In 2007, Katsura said his style had become darker, with Asuna's work probably being the core of who he is now.

Katsura said he drew instinctively in the beginning of his career, but gradually came to "calculate" his manga creation and think about what would make people happy. His works and characters are never based on his own experiences, as he wants to show as little of himself as possible. Katsura is known for drawing beautiful girl characters (bishōjo). This began with his first editor, Torishima, who told him to always draw girls as cute as possible. He meticulously researches hairstyles, fashion and mannerisms to see what kind of girls will be popular in order to attract both male and female readers. Katsura includes erotic elements in his work, for example, he is particularly known for drawing female buttocks. Katsura's former assistants include Dragon Quest: The Adventure of Dai illustrator Koji Inada, and Ex-Arm creator Shinya Komi.

== Personal life ==
Katsura famously commissioned a costume resembling the one worn by the protagonist of his manga series Wing-Man for 1 million yen. He notably modeled it, and other versions, himself in magazines, such as Weekly Shōnen Jump issue 27 of 1985. In January 2025, Katsura learned that his original manuscripts for all fifteen volumes of Video Girl Ai had been stolen during the act of moving studios in October 2024 and were being sold via online auctions. He said the police refused to investigate due to a lack of evidence. Similarly, in February 2025, Katsura posted to X that a Wing-Man costume, which had been stolen from a locker in his home a decade ago, had recently been sold at a festival. He asked that the buyer return it. In November 2025, Katsura announced that he was recovering after having recently undergone an unspecified major surgery.

Katsura was good friends with fellow manga artist Akira Toriyama. The two met in the early 1980s, after having been introduced by their mutual editor Kazuhiko Torishima, and even parodied each other in their own manga. Toriyama advised Katsura to make DNA² a battle manga while he could, and to turn the protagonist's hair white and make it stand up; similar to Toriyama's own Dragon Ball. Toriyama credited Katsura with coming up with the idea to have two characters "fuse" together in Dragon Ball, leading to the Fusion technique. However, Katsura said this is only a rumor; while he did in fact suggest it to him, he knows that Toriyama was not listening and claims Toriyama later thought it up on his own.

== Works ==
Manga

- Tsubasa (ツバサ; one-shot, 1980)
- Tenkosei wa Hensosei?! (転校生はヘンソウセイ!?; one-shot, 1981)
- Wing-Man (1983–1985)
- Katsura Masakazu Collection Vol. 1 (桂正和コレクション VOL. 1; short story collection, 1984)
- Super Mobile Troop Vander (超機動員ヴァンダー; 1985–1986)
- Present from Lemon (プレゼント・フロム LEMON; 1987)
- Katsura Masakazu Collection Vol. 2 (桂正和コレクション VOL. 2; short story collection, 1989)
- Video Girl Ai (電影少女, Den'ei Shōjo; 1989–1992)

Includes Video Girl Len

- Shadow Lady (1992–1993, 1995–1996)
- DNA² (D・N・A² 〜何処かで失くしたあいつのアイツ〜; 1993–1994)
- Zetman Katsura Masakazu Short Story Collection (ZETMAN 桂正和短編集; short story collection, 1995)
- M (エム; 1996)
- I"s (1997–1999)
- Dr. Chambalee (Dr.チャンバリー; one-shot, 2000)
- Zetman (2002–2014)
- Sachie-chan Good!! (さちえちゃんグー!!; one-shot, story by Akira Toriyama, 2008)
- Jiya (JIYA -ジヤ-; story by Akira Toriyama, 2009–2010)
- Katsura & Akira Short Stories (桂正和×鳥山明 共作短編集 カツラアキラ; short story collection with Akira Toriyama, 2014)
- Okaeri (おかえり; one-shot, story by Erika Yoshida, 2020)

Other works

- Iria: Zeiram the Animation (OVA, character designs, 1994)
- Love & Destroy (video game, character designs, 1999)
- Bitch's Life (3 illustrations, 2001)
- Tiger & Bunny (anime, character designs, 2011)
- Garo: Crimson Moon (anime, character designs, 2015)
- The Girl in Twilight (multimedia franchise, character designs, 2018)
- Astral Chain (video game, character design, 2019)
- Positive Sensitive Hips: Katsura Masakazu o Shiri Gashū (ポジティブ・センシティブ 桂正和お尻画集; art book, 2026)
