= Zetman =

Japanese manga series by Masakazu Katsura

- First tankōbon volume cover, featuring Jin Kanzaki as Zetman
- Genre: Action; Science fiction; Superhero
- Manga
- Written by: Masakazu Katsura
- Published by: Shueisha
- Imprint: Young Jump Comics
- Magazine: Weekly Young Jump
- Original run: October 31, 2002 – July 24, 2014
- Volumes: 20
- Anime television series
- Directed by: Osamu Nabeshima
- Produced by: Takashi Takano; Shūichi Kitada; Yoshihiro Furusawa; Jun'ichi Hatano; Yōsuke Tsuruki
- Written by: Atsuhiro Tomioka
- Music by: Gabriele Roberto; Suble; Yū Yanaura; Megumi Sasano; Yasushi Sasamoto
- Studio: TMS Entertainment
- Licensed by: AU: Madman Entertainment; NA: Viz Media
- Original network: ytv, Tokyo MX, BS11
- English network: NA: Neon Alley
- Original run: April 3, 2012 – June 26, 2012
- Episodes: 13
- icon

Zetman (stylized in all caps) is a Japanese manga series written and illustrated by Masakazu Katsura. First published as a 49-page one-shot in Shueisha's shōnen manga magazine Weekly Shōnen Jump's 1994 Autumn Special, the full-fledged series was published in Shueisha's seinen manga magazine Weekly Young Jump from October 2002 to July 2014, with its chapters collected in 20 tankōbon volumes. A 13-episode anime television series adaptation by TMS Entertainment was broadcast in Japan from April to June 2012. In North America, the anime series was licensed for English language release by Viz Media.

== Plot ==
The story starts off with a face-off between two rival superheroes, ZET and Alphas, and then traces their origins – Jin Kanzaki, a young man with the ability to transform into a superhuman being known as ZET, and Kouga Amagi, a young man with a strong sense of justice who uses technology to fight as Alphas.

The fates of these two men and those around them intertwine as they fight to protect mankind and destroy monstrous abominations known as Players, who ironically are the creations of the Amagi Corporation, the company founded by Kouga's grandfather, Mitsugai Amagi.

== Characters ==
Jin Kanzaki (神崎 人, Kanzaki Jin) / Jin (ジン) / ZET
Voiced by: Daisuke Namikawa, Romi Park (young) (Japanese); Jason Griffith, Casey Mongillo (young) (English)
A mysterious young man. Jin is a result of the NET Project by the Amagi Corporation to create the perfect being to fight and destroy the escaped Players. He was however released by Gorō Kanzaki, who wanted nothing more for Jin than to grow up as a normal human. After the death of Kanzaki, Jin stayed with Akemi Kawakami until he witnessed her 'death' under the hands of the Amagi Corp., in an effort to retrieve their creation.
Jin is able to transform a creature known as "ZET", a mutant possessing superhuman abilities, but often mistaken for another Player. The transformation is slow, though it may be accelerated due to extreme rage and conditions.
Kouga Amagi (天城 高雅, Amagi Kōga) or Kouga (コウガ, Kōga) / Alphas (アルファス, Arufasu)
Voiced by: Mamoru Miyano, Yuki Kaida (young) (Japanese); Grant George, Colin Francis (young) (English)
A young man both academically and sports-inclined. He is the grandson of Mitsugai Amagi, founder of the Amagi Corporation. Due to his attraction to an anime 'Ginga Chōjin Alphas', Kouga has developed a strong sense of justice since young. Urged by his encounter with Jin during a fire accident, he had been depending on a trio of researchers since middle school for gadgets which could assist him in his escapades. He lost his right forearm during his captivity by Jirou Nakata, together with his sense of justice.
After learning about the Players and his grandfather's involvement in the project, he initiates the Alphas Project with the trio, who created a high-performance combat body suit resembling Kouga's childhood hero, complete with high-tech weaponry and gadgets, to combat his grandfather's creations. He is very protective of his family, especially his sister, Konoha.
Konoha Amagi (天城 小葉, Amagi Konoha)
Voiced by: Kana Hanazawa (Japanese); Sophie Roberts (Teen), Stephanie Sheh (Young) (English)
Sister to Kouga and granddaughter of Mitsugai. She bears a distinct dislike to her grandfather due to childhood trauma. Konoha first met Jin during her secret volunteer work with her mother when they were still small, and has been harboring feelings for him ever since. When she saw Jin emerge from the building destroyed by the Fire Player and see him faint, she picks up his grandfather's pendant, which she continued to hold onto until the Jin clones stole it from her during the assault on Amagi manor. She is unaware of Jin being ZET, nor of her family's involvement with the Players.
Hanako Tanaka (田中 花子, Tanaka Hanako)
Voiced by: Mariya Ise (Japanese); Erin Fitzgerald (English)
A tomboyish teenage girl. She has had constant headaches since she was born, leading her to go to the nurse's office quite often as a result. Because of this, students thought she was just slacking off. She was frequently bullied by them, leaving her traumatized and unwilling to go to high school. After her pattern of not attending school increased, her parents started becoming apathetic to her. This contributed to her decision to run away. She met Jin as he was living in the slum she ran away to and has developed romantic feelings for him.

=== Amagi Corporation ===
Mitsugai Amagi (天城 光鎧, Amagi Mitsugai)
Voiced by: Shozo Iizuka (Japanese); Steve Kramer (English)
Founder and ex-CEO of the Amagi Corporation, who believed in a distinct divide between the rich and the poor. In the pursuit of his dream to create the perfect artificial humans, he initiated the NET Project, but it eventually led to the escape of his creations, the Players. Having a heavy sense of responsibility for the incident, Mitsugai then commenced Project ZET to set things right, though once again his plans were foiled by the betrayal of Kanzaki. He then became hell-bent on retrieving ZET back after countless failures to create a new one.
Mitsugai's methods were often hard-handed, but after the destruction of his laboratory a second time by Players, he seems to have experienced a change of heart. He then gave Jin a choice of either becoming ZET or living as a normal human, though it is unknown if this is just a facade or not. He has also agreed to help Kouga in any way he can.
Seizou Amagi (天城 清造, Amagi Seizō)
Voiced by: Masashi Hirose (Japanese); Stephen Mann (English)
Son of Mitsugai, husband of Youko and father to Kouga and Konoha. Current CEO of the Amagi Corporation. An arrogant, sober and cold-hearted man and with elitist attitude. Amagi's entitlement attitude is tied in part to his family's name. He was named one of the masterminds of the NET Project by Jirou, but he feigns ignorance to all the various secret projects under Amagi Corp.
Hayami (早見)
Voiced by: Kenichi Suzumura (Japanese); Matthew Mercer (English)
An executive in Amagi Corp. and assistant to Seizou Kouga. He supports Kouga's actions as Alphas, though he only does so to prevent him from taking over Amagi Corp. After being left in a vegetative state, Hayami was brought back by an unknown individual, revealing to Kouga that he was in league with him in a plan to bring down the Amagi clan, which would allow Hayami to take position as the new C.E.O. of Amagi Corp. Soon after his revelation to Kouga, he injects him with one of the insects made by a clone of Ichirō, in order for Kouga's body to reach superhuman levels and help him achieve his agenda. Afterwards, Hayami, Seiji, and Suzuki ("Katou") launched a terrorist attack on a New Year's Eve party that Seizou is hosting, in an attempt to make Seizou confess to all the injustices that he committed on film. One of the hostages tried to grab a machine gun from one of the underlings, and in the chaos, Hayami was shot in the chest and seemingly killed.

=== EVOL ===
EVOL leader (マスター, Masutā)
Voiced by: Kōji Ishii (Japanese); Taylor Henry (English)
The mysterious leader of EVOL, he intends to conquer the world and wipe out humanity. It is unknown what the extent of his power is, though he has the power to keep Players from reverting, and his Player form was modeled after a wolf (while he was fully organic). He was one of the original 13 Players that rebelled, and the creator of the G2 and G3 Players.
Seiji Haitani (灰谷 政次, Haitani Seiji) / Anvil (エンヴィル, Envuiru)
Voiced by: Kōji Yusa (Japanese); Keith Silverstein (English)
The brains of EVOL. He seems to have an interest in Jin, as he implanted a ceramic spike into Jin's heart in order to allow him to freely become ZET. He is shown to be merciless when it comes to getting what he wants. As Anvil, Haitani appears as an angelic being with demonic wings, the complete opposite of Inzen's Degel form. He has even stated that his powers are the opposite of Degel's, so they are pretty much neutralized by each other. The eye in the middle of his chest, if gazed into by Inzen/Degel, is able to keep him frozen in place. He desires to become one with Degel, though is unable to because of their opposing natures.
The Sweeper (掃除人, Sōjinin)
Voiced by: Rikiya Koyama (Japanese); Marc Diraison (English)
Little is known about him except for his appearances to kill off defective Players and that there are dozens of him. He also shows some interest in ZET and wishes to fight with him.
Souya Inzen (陰禅 宗弥, Inzen Sōya) / Degel (デゼル, Dezeru)
Another high ranking EVOL. He and Seiji are two of the three main EVOLs, along with their mysterious leader. He is shown to disapprove of the tactics Seiji uses to get what he wants, and is weary of him doing whatever he wants. He is also a firm believer of the ends justifying the means. Inzen is shown to be strong enough to defeat Kouga/Alphasz in an instant. When he first appeared, he and Kosuri/Bat Player kidnapped the creator of the "Ginga Chōjin Alphasz" anime series for unknown reasons. He later appears during Haitani's attack on Amagi Corp., intent on ending the rogue Player for his betrayal as well as kill Jin, believing him to be too dangerous to allow to live.
As Degel, he appears in a towering demonic form with angelic wings, the complete opposite of Haitani's Anvil form. He is also able to shoot demonic-appearing rods out of his hands, which have the ability to transform into soldiers that follow his commands.

=== Other characters ===
Jirou Nakata (中田 二郎, Nakata Jirō)
Voiced by: Katsunosuke Hori (Japanese); Dave Mallow (English)
The father of Ichirou, one of the Players. Jirou is a former scientist of Amagi Corp. and an expert in researching the creation of the Players. He admits that the only people he ever cared for were his wife and son, and was devastated when he witnessed his son's murder. When he discovered that the Players were to be used as a means of entertainment, he spoke out against the idea to Kabe, and was sealed inside his underground laboratory soon after, along with the corpse of his son. He soon revived Ichirou by turning him into a Player, and the two survived in the laboratory for sixteen years on nothing but water and medications. When they were set free, he began to plot his revenge against Amagi Corp., along with Ichirou and Katou, a greedy Amagi employee.
Gorō Kanzaki (神崎 悟郎, Kanzaki Gorō)
Voiced by: Mitsuo Senda (Japanese); Adam Nevel (English)
A pioneer in both the NET and ZET Projects in the Amagi Corporation, Kanzaki escaped with an infant Jin in defiance to turning his 'child' into a killing machine. Later disguised himself as a homeless old man and posed as the grandfather of the growing Jin. He was killed in a bid to protect Jin from an awakened Player. Kanzaki's head was however retrieved by the Amagi Corp. and hooked up to a computer so as to obtain unknown information about ZET/Jin.
Akemi Kawakami (川上 明美, Kawakami Akemi)
The foster parent to Jin after Kanzaki. Always addressed as "old lady" or "auntie" by Jin, Akemi was an ex-hostess who had a son she lost custody of to her ex-husband. Her face was slashed by a crazed client, who in turn suffered near fatal injuries by a young Jin, having recalled how his grandfather was killed. She has been selling crepes at a roadside stall ever since. She was seemingly killed right in front of Jin's eyes in a bid to let Jin return to the Amagi Corp., but was later revealed by Mitsugai to be alive, and was given back custody of her son with the help of Amagi Corp.
Youko Amagi (天城 葉子, Amagi Yōko)
Voiced by: Aya Hisakawa (Japanese); Cricket Brown (English)
Seizou's wife, and mother to Kouga and Konoha. She was chastised by Mitsugai for doing volunteer work in secret, resulting in Konoha's childhood trauma. She then ran away from home while continuing her volunteer work, and never returned. However, she and Seizou are not officially divorced yet. It is eventually revealed that she has been staying at the home of her lover, Suzuki. She and Konoha are soon kidnapped by Seiji and Suzuki, the latter revealing that Seizou funded human experiments on his wife and his son, Katou. Soon afterwards, Amagi Tower starts to be destroyed, and in the chaos, she is seen falling into an inferno, but she was saved by Suzuki.
Satoshi Suzuki (鈴木 聡史, Suzuki Satoshi)
A friend of Jin's and Youko's lover. After Youko ran away, she went to live with him, where they continued to help the homeless. After Jin was nearly captured, he offers him and those with him sanctuary. Soon afterwards, it is revealed that he is working with Seiji, and the two of them kidnap Konoha and Youko. During Seiji's planned attack on Amagi Corp., he reveals to Seizou, Youko and Konoha that Seizou's funding of human experiments cost him the lives of his wife and his son, Katou. Thus, he reveals that he was Katou, the mastermind behind the incident with Jirou.

== Media ==
=== Manga ===
Written and illustrated by Masakazu Katsura, Zetman was first published as a 49-page one-shot story in Shueisha's shōnen manga magazine Weekly Shōnen Jump's 1994 Autumn Special. The chapter was collected, alongside three other one-shots by Katsura, in a single volume titled Zetman, released on July 4, 1995. It later started publication as a full-fledged series in the seinen manga magazine Weekly Young Jump on October 31, 2002, and finished on July 24, 2014 (announced as the ending of "Act 1"). Shueisha collected its chapters in 20 tankōbon volumes, released from November 19, 2003, to October 17, 2014. In 2023, Katsura said he would like to draw a continuation, "but I'm well past my prime". The following year, he explained that he had intended to shift to a more entertainment-focused direction for Act 2, which is titled "Abaki no Kōrin" (暴きの光輪; lit. 'The Halo of Revelation'), and revealed the reason for the hiatus was that he was unable to keep up with the industry's transition from analog manga creation to digital and that he then became overloaded with other projects. Katsura also said he considered providing only the names and having another artist actually draw the Zetman continuation, but he still has a strong desire to draw it himself.

=== Anime ===
Zetman was adapted into an anime television series directed by Osamu Nabeshima, with series composition by Atsuhiro Tomioka, and character designs by Hirotoshi Takaya. Gabriele Roberto supervised the music. It was broadcast for 13 episodes on Yomiuri TV, Tokyo MX and BS11 from April 3 to June 26, 2012. (Note: Yomiuri TV listed the air dates for the series on Monday at 26:23, which is effectively Tuesday at 2:23 a.m. JST.)

The anime was available on streaming on Hulu and Viz Media's streaming service. The series started streaming on RetroCrush on November 12, 2021.

==== Episodes ====
No.	Title	Original release date
1	"Untaught Emotions" "Mijukuna Kanjō" (未熟な感情)	April 3, 2012
2	"In the Fire" "Guren no Naka de" (紅蓮の中で)	April 10, 2012
3	"Tears" "Namida" (涙)	April 17, 2012
4	"Ill Fortune" "Yakubyōgami" (疫病神)	April 24, 2012
5	"Alphas" "Arufasu" (アルファス)	May 1, 2012
6	"Hostage" "Hitojichi" (人質)	May 8, 2012
7	"The Ring of Exposure" "Abaki no Wa" (暴きの輪)	May 15, 2012
8	"A Normal Family" "Futsū no Kazoku" (普通の家族)	May 22, 2012
9	"Whereabouts of the Pendant" "Katami no Yukue" (形見の行方)	May 29, 2012
10	"Party" "Pātī" (パーティー)	June 5, 2012
11	"Puppet" "Ayatsuri Ningyō" (操り人形)	June 12, 2012
12	"The Red Stake" "Akai Kui" (赤い杭)	June 19, 2012
13	"Funeral Procession" "Sōretsu" (葬列)	June 26, 2012

== Reception ==
By October 2011, the manga had sold 3.5 million copies.

Sébastien Kimbergt of Animeland noted that the author's previous tales were about "teens' trifles", in contrast to Zetman's "brutal adventures with a profound darkness", and that they preferred Zetman to the author's other works. Animeland noted that Zetman was serialised over a period of many years, which Animeland says gave "the advantage of time to refine the script". Mickaël Géreaume from Planet BD felt that the first volume was inspired by the author's great love of Batman, finding it surprising considering the author's other works were romantic comedies.
