= Video Girl Ai =

Manga by Masakazu Katsura and its adaptations

- First tankōbon volume cover, featuring Ai Amano

電影少女 (Den'ei Shōjo)
- Genre: Romantic comedy; Science fiction
- Manga
- Written by: Masakazu Katsura
- Published by: Shueisha
- English publisher: NA: Viz Media
- Imprint: Jump Comics
- Magazine: Weekly Shōnen Jump
- English magazine: NA: Animerica Extra
- Original run: December 4, 1989 – April 20, 1992
- Volumes: 13
- Manga

Video Girl Len
- Written by: Masakazu Katsura
- Published by: Shueisha
- English publisher: NA: Viz Media
- Imprint: Jump Comics
- Magazine: Weekly Shōnen Jump
- Original run: April 27, 1992 – July 20, 1992
- Volumes: 2
- Live-action film
- Directed by: Ryū Kaneda
- Studio: Toho
- Released: June 29, 1991
- Runtime: 95 minutes
- Original video animation
- Directed by: Mizuho Nishikubo
- Produced by: Mitsuhisa Ishikawa; Tetsuo Daitoku
- Written by: Mayori Sekijima; Satoru Akahori
- Music by: Tōru Okada
- Studio: I.G. Tatsunoko
- Licensed by: NA: Viz Media
- Released: March 27, 1992 – August 28, 1992
- Episodes: 6
- Light novel
- Written by: Sukehiro Tomita
- Published by: Shueisha
- Imprint: Jump J-Books
- Published: 1993
- Television drama

Den'ei Shōjo: Video Girl Ai 2018
- Directed by: Kazuaki Seki
- Written by: Kōhei Kiyasu
- Music by: tofubeats
- Studio: TV Tokyo; Robot Communications
- Original network: TXN (TV Tokyo)
- Original run: January 14, 2018 – April 1, 2018
- Episodes: 12
- Television drama

Den'ei Shōjo: Video Girl Mai 2019
- Directed by: Kazuaki Seki
- Written by: Kōhei Kiyasu; Yoshitatsu Yamada; Minato Takano
- Music by: KERENMI
- Studio: TV Tokyo; Robot Communications
- Original network: TV Tokyo
- Original run: April 12, 2019 – June 28, 2019
- Episodes: 12
- icon

Video Girl Ai, known in Japan as simply Video Girl (電影少女, Den'ei Shōjo), is a Japanese manga series written and illustrated by Masakazu Katsura. It was serialized in Shueisha's shōnen manga magazine Weekly Shōnen Jump from December 1989 to April 1992. It was followed by a short sequel entitled Video Girl Len, published between April and July 1992. The chapters were collected in 15 tankōbon volumes.

A live-action film of Video Girl Ai was released in 1991. The series was also adapted into a six-episode original video animation (OVA) series produced by IG Tatsunoko, released in 1992 by Jump Video. In 2018, a television drama adaptation, Den'ei Shōjo: Video Girl Ai 2018, was broadcast on TV Tokyo. Another series, Den'ei Shōjo: Video Girl Mai 2019, was broadcast the following year.

In North America, the manga and the OVA have been licensed for English-language release by Viz Media. It was formerly published in the anthology Animerica Extra by Viz.

By 2018, the manga had over 14 million copies in print.

== Plot ==
Yota Moteuchi discovers that Moemi Hayakawa, the girl he admires, has romantic feelings for his close friend Takashi Niimai. While returning home disappointed, he encounters an unusual establishment called "Gokuraku" ('Paradise'), and rents a video titled I'll Cheer You Up! featuring Ai Amano, unaware it contains a "video girl"—a being designed to materialize from television screens to comfort viewers. Due to a malfunctioning video recorder, Ai emerges with irregular traits including the capacity for genuine emotional experience.

Initially programmed to support Yota's pursuit of Moemi, Ai gradually develops romantic feelings for him, which he eventually reciprocates after abandoning his affection for Moemi. Their relationship faces challenges when Rolex, a representative of Gokuraku, attempts to retrieve Ai due to her defective state, compounded by the impending expiration of her rental period.

The narrative follows their efforts to navigate these obstacles while addressing other complications, including Yota's lingering attachment to Moemi and his interactions with Nobuko Nizaki. Ai frequently engages in provocative behavior toward Yota, such as feigning sexual advances or intruding on private moments under guises of assistance, generating comedic situations through his flustered reactions.

== Characters ==
Ai Amano (天野 あい, Amano Ai)
Voiced by: Megumi Hayashibara (OVA), Minami Takayama (drama CD) (Japanese); Maggie Blue O'Hara (English)
Portrayed by: Kaori Sakagami (1991 film), Nanase Nishino (2018 TV drama)
Ai is a vibrant and energetic video girl, though her true personality differs from her intended design. Typically, video girls are programmed to be gentle, elegant, and skilled in domestic tasks. However, due to a malfunction in Yota's VCR, Ai behaves more tomboyishly, often displaying bluntness and a tendency toward physical outbursts. Initially a poor cook, she later improves through self-teaching. Despite these quirks, she possesses strong empathy and genuine emotional depth. The same malfunction also causes a noticeable reduction in her breasts.
Yota "Dateless" Moteuchi (弄内 洋太, Moteuchi Yōta) (Note: This nickname is based on a pun with the Japanese verb 持てる (moteru), which means to be well liked or popular (or to be able to have something). A second way to read 弄内 is motenai, which is the negative conjugation for moteru (in other words, unable to have something). An attempt to get the joke across to English-speaking audiences is made by Ai, who reads his name and declares, "Motenai?!? As in Loser?")
Voiced by: Takeshi Kusao (OVA), Nozomu Sasaki (drama CD) (Japanese); Brad Swaile (English)
Portrayed by: Ken Osawa (1991 film), Shigeyuki Totsugi (2018 TV drama)
A socially awkward and insecure individual, often struggling to express his feelings toward his unrequited love, Moemi. Nervous and clumsy around women, he fits the stereotype of a timid underdog. Despite these traits, he demonstrates genuine kindness, compassion, and loyalty toward those close to him, frequently going out of his way to help others.
Moemi Hayakawa (早川 もえみ, Hayakawa Moemi)
Voiced by: Yuri Amano (OVA), Kotono Mitsuishi (drama CD) (Japanese); Jennifer Copping (English)
Portrayed by: Hiromi Hamaguchi (1991 film)
Moemi develops romantic feelings for Takashi, who does not return her affections due to his popularity among other potential partners.
Takashi Niimai (新舞 貴志, Niimai Takashi)
Voiced by: Koji Tsujitani (OVA), Kazuhiko Inoue (drama CD) (Japanese); Samuel Vincent (English)
Portrayed by: Naoki Hosaka (1991 film)
Takashi fits the conventional "tall, dark and handsome" archetype and maintains considerable popularity. As one of Yota's closest friends, he declines Moemi's romantic overtures out of awareness for Yota's feelings toward her.
Nobuko Nizaki (仁崎 伸子, Nizaki Nobuko)
Nobuko Nizaki is a junior student who developed romantic feelings for Yota after meeting him in art class two years prior. When Moemi and Ai become temporarily unavailable, she attempts to pursue a relationship with him.
Natsumi Yamaguchi (山口 夏美, Yamaguchi Natsumi)
A childhood friend of Yota, having attended kindergarten with him before her family relocated. Orphaned and living as a runaway, she becomes associated with themes of misfortune while maintaining a compassionate nature, often symbolized by an outstretched helping hand. She suffers from a heart condition. Her eventual hospitalization and death later influence Ai's understanding of romantic love.

=== Len story characters ===
Len Momono (ももの 連, Momono Ren)
The protagonist of Let's Fall in Love is a newly created video girl with no prior field experience. Developed by an unnamed former Gokuraku store employee known only as "Old Man", she differs from standard models like Ai by possessing autonomous emotional capacity.
Hiromu Taguchi (田口 広夢, Taguchi Hiromu) and Toshiki Karukawa (刈川 俊騎, Karikawa Toshiki)
Hiromu and Toshiki are students who rent the video girl tape. Hiromu, the arc's central character, displays shyness comparable to Yota's earlier behavior. His romantic interest in Ayumi faces complications due to both his timidity and her questionable reputation. Though they eventually become engaged, their relationship falters when Hiromu's preoccupation with happiness leads to neglect, resulting in a temporary separation until he rediscovers his feelings. Toshiki presents as more emotionally volatile, exhibiting teenage behaviors like spying on Len—actions that provoke her anger.
Ayumi Shirakawa (白川 歩み, Shirakawa Ayumi)
Ayumi becomes the romantic interest of Hiromu, though their potential relationship faces obstacles due to damaging rumors spread by her former boyfriend. These rumors negatively affect her reputation across multiple schools, including Hiromu's institution. Len intervenes by orchestrating a situation that reveals the ex-boyfriend's true nature to Ayumi. This leads Ayumi to permanently end that previous relationship and begin dating Hiromu.
Yota Moteuchi
Eight years after the events of Video Girl Ai, Yota works as an afternoon instructor at an art school attended by Hiromu and Ayumi. He serves as Hiromu's mentor, with their frequent conversations often focusing on Len. Yota shares with Ayumi that Len faced similar challenges to her current situation. During the series, he briefly mentions that Ai is faring well.

== Media ==
=== Manga ===
Video Girl Ai is written and illustrated by Masakazu Katsura. The manga was serialized in the shōnen manga magazine Weekly Shōnen Jump from December 4, 1989, to April 20, 1992. It was followed by Video Girl Len, which was serialized from April 27 to July 20, 1992. Shueisha compiled the 131 individual chapters into fifteen tankōbon volumes published between July 1990 and March 1993. Shueisha re-published the series into nine bunkoban volumes between January and May 2003.

In North America, Viz Media announced the license of the manga in August 1998. It was first published in the anthology Animerica Extra by Viz until the cancelation of the magazine in December 2004. The manga was originally released in a left to right edition; this version was compiled into seven volumes published between January 2000 and January 2004. The complete series was released in a second edition of all fifteen volumes in the original right to left orientation between May 2004 and April 2006.

==== List of volumes ====
No.	Original release date	Original ISBN	English release date	English ISBN
01	July 10, 1990	4-08-871801-1	January 5, 2000 (1st ed.); May 26, 2004 (2nd ed.)	978-1-56931-431-9 (1st ed.); 978-1-59116-074-8 (2nd ed.)
02	September 10, 1990	4-08-871802-X	August 30, 2000 (1st ed.); June 2, 2004 (2nd ed.)	978-1-56931-536-1 (1st ed.); 978-1-59116-075-5 (2nd ed.)
03	November 9, 1990	4-08-871803-8	September 9, 2001 (1st ed.); October 12, 2004 (2nd ed.)	978-1-56931-632-0 (1st ed.); 978-1-59116-103-5 (2nd ed.)
04	January 10, 1991	4-08-871804-6	February 9, 2002 (1st ed.); October 19, 2004 (2nd ed.)	978-1-56931-715-0 (1st ed.); 978-1-59116-104-2 (2nd ed.)
05	March 8, 1991	4-08-871805-4	March 6, 2003 (1st ed.); January 11, 2005 (2nd ed.)	978-1-56931-855-3 (1st ed.); 978-1-59116-146-2 (2nd ed.)
06	June 10, 1991	4-08-871806-2	July 1, 2003 (1st ed.); January 11, 2005 (2nd ed.)	978-1-56931-895-9 (1st ed.); 978-1-59116-607-8 (2nd ed.)
07	August 7, 1991	4-08-871807-0	January 28, 2004 (1st ed.); April 12, 2005 (2nd ed.)	978-1-59116-203-2 (1st ed.); 978-1-59116-748-8 (2nd ed.)
08	October 9, 1991	4-08-871808-9	June 9, 2004	978-1-59116-303-9
09	December 3, 1991	4-08-871809-7	October 5, 2004	978-1-59116-304-6
10	February 10, 1992	4-08-871810-0	January 11, 2005	978-1-59116-305-3
11	May 8, 1992	4-08-871701-5	April 12, 2005	978-1-59116-306-0
12	July 3, 1992	4-08-871702-3	July 12, 2005	978-1-59116-307-7
13	September 4, 1992	4-08-871703-1	October 11, 2005	978-1-59116-308-4
14	November 4, 1992	4-08-871704-X	January 10, 2006	978-1-59116-309-1
15	March 4, 1993	4-08-871705-8	April 11, 2006	978-1-4215-0295-3

=== Live-action film ===
A live-action film of Video Girl Ai was released on June 29, 1991.

=== Original video animation ===
Video Girl Ai was adapted into a six-episode OVA produced by IG Tatsunoko (now Production I.G). The series was released in 1992 by Jump Video. It roughly covers most of the material found in the first three volumes of the manga.

In North America, Viz Video released the OVA on VHS in 1999 and on DVD in December 2001.

=== Drama ===
In 2018, a live-action television drama called Den'ei Shōjo: Video Girl Ai 2018 ran on TV Tokyo. The series is set 25 years after the original manga and the main character is the nephew of Yota Moteuchi. TV Tokyo continued the live-action adaptation with a second series Den'ei Shōjo: Video Girl Mai 2019, focusing on the character Mai, played by Mizuki Yamashita.

== Reception ==
As of 2018, the manga has over 14 million copies in print.
