= List of works by Akira Toriyama =

Akira Toriyama (Japanese: 鳥山 明, Hepburn: Toriyama Akira; April 5, 1955 – March 1, 2024) was a Japanese manga artist and character designer. He first achieved mainstream recognition for creating the popular manga series Dr. Slump (1980–1984), before going on to create Dragon Ball (1984–1995); his most famous work.

Following its conclusion, Toriyama continued drawing manga, predominantly one-shots and short (100–200-page) serials, including Cowa! (1997–1998), Kajika (1998), and Sand Land (2000). 2013's Jaco the Galactic Patrolman was the last manga he wrote and illustrated entirely by himself. Toriyama also collaborated with other manga artists, such as Masakazu Katsura and Eiichiro Oda, to produce one-shots and crossover shorts. He began Dragon Ball Super with illustrator Toyotarou in 2015, and continued to work on the manga until his death in 2024.

Toriyama also created numerous character designs for various video games such as the Dragon Quest series (1986–2024), Chrono Trigger (1995), Blue Dragon (2006), and some Dragon Ball video games. He also designed several characters and mascots for Shueisha's, his career-long employer and Japan's largest publishing company, various manga magazines.

Besides manga-related works, Toriyama also created various illustrations, album covers, book covers, mascots and logos.

== Works ==
=== Manga ===
Name	Year	Notes	Ref.
Awawa World (あわわワールド, Awawa Wārudo)	1977	Unpublished, submission for Monthly Young Jump Award. Printed in 1983 in Toriyama's fan club newsletter, Bird Land Press # 5 & 6.	
Mysterious Rain Jack (謎のレインジャック, Nazo no Rein Jakku)	1978	Unpublished, submission for Monthly Young Jump Award. Printed in 1982 in Toriyama's fan club newsletter, Bird Land Press # 3 & 4.	
Wonder Island (ワンダー・アイランド, Wandā Airando)	1978	One-shot in Weekly Shōnen Jump 1978 #52	
Wonder Island 2 (ワンダー・アイランド2, Wandā Airando Tsū)	1978	One-shot in Weekly Shōnen Jump January 1979 Special Issue	
Today's Highlight Island (本日のハイライ島, Honjitsu no Hairai-tō)	1979	One-shot in Weekly Shōnen Jump April Special Issue	
Tomato the Cutesy Gumshoe (ギャル刑事トマト, Gyaru Deka Tomato)	1979	One-shot in Weekly Shōnen Jump August Special Issue	
Dr. Slump (Dr. スランプ, Dokutā Suranpu)	1980–1984	236 chapters in Weekly Shōnen Jump 1980 #5/6 – 1984 #39, assembled into 18 tankōbon, reassembled into 9 aizoban in 1990, 9 bunkoban in 1995, and 15 kanzenban in 2006	
Pola & Roid	1981	One-shot in Weekly Shōnen Jump 1981 #17; Toriyama's winning entry in the 1981 Reader's Choice competition	
Escape	1981	One-shot in Weekly Shōnen Jump January 1982 Special Issue	
Mad Matic	1982	One-shot in Weekly Shōnen Jump 1982 #12; Toriyama's entry in the 1982 Reader's Choice competition	
Pink	1982	One-shot in Fresh Jump December 1982 issue	
Hetappi Manga Kenkyūjo	1982–1984	1 tankōbon originally serialized in Fresh Jump, drawing lesson co-authored with Akira Sakuma	
Chobit	1983	One-shot in Weekly Shōnen Jump; Toriyama's entry in the 1983 Reader's Choice competition	
Chobit 2	1983	One-shot in Fresh Jump June 1983 issue	
Dragon Boy (騎竜少年, Doragon Bōi)	1983	2 one-shots in Fresh Jump August and October 1983 issues	
The Adventure of Tongpoo (トンプー大冒険, Tonpū Dai Bōken)	1983	One-shot in Weekly Shōnen Jump	
Akira Toriyama's Manga Theater Vol. 1	1983	1 tankōbon, collects previously published one-shots	
Dragon Ball	1984–1995	519 chapters and one extra chapter in Weekly Shōnen Jump 1984 #51 – 1995 #25, compiled into 42 tankōbon, reassembled into 34 kanzenban in 2002 with an altered ending, and 18 sōshūhen in 2016	
Mr. Ho (Mr.ホー)	1986	One-shot in Weekly Shōnen Jump 1986 #49	
Lady Red	1987	One-shot in Super Jump #2	
Young Master Ken'nosuke (剣之介さま, Kennosuke-sama)	1987	One-shot in Weekly Shōnen Jump 1987 #38	
The Elder (そんちょう, Sonchoh)	1987	One-shot in Weekly Shōnen Jump 1988 #5	
Little Mamejiro (豆次郎くん, Mamejirō-kun)	1988	One-shot in Weekly Shōnen Jump	
Akira Toriyama's Manga Theater Vol. 2	1988	1 tankōbon, collects previously published one-shots	
Karamaru and the Perfect Day (空丸くん日本晴れ, Karamaru-kun Nihonbare)	1989	One-shot in Weekly Shōnen Jump	
Rocky	1989	Four-page one-shot in Dōjinshi (動じん誌), a doujinshi by manga artist Neko Jyu Jisha that collects works by different artists.	
Wolf	1990	One-shot, published in the art book Akira Toriyama: The World	
Soldier of Savings Cashman (貯金戦士 CASHMAN, Chokin Senshi Kyasshuman)	1990–1991	3 one-shots in V Jump	
Dub & Peter 1	1992–1993	4 one-shots in V Jump	
Go! Go! Ackman	1993–1994	11 one-shots in V Jump	
Alien X-Peke (宇宙人ペケ, Uchūjin Peke)	1996	Two chapters in Weekly Shōnen Jump	
Tokimecha	1996–1997	Three chapters in Weekly Shōnen Jump	
Bubul and the Majin Village (魔人村のBUBUL, Majin Mura no Bubul)	1997	One-shot in Weekly Shōnen Jump 1997 #22/23; Toriyama's winning entry in the revived Jump Readers' Cup '97 competition	
Akira Toriyama's Manga Theater Vol. 3	1997	1 tankōbon, collects previously published one-shots	
Cowa!	1997–1998	14 chapters serialized in Weekly Shōnen Jump, collected in 1 tankōbon	
Kajika	1998	12 chapters serialized in Weekly Shōnen Jump, collected in 1 tankōbon	
Mahimahi the Lungfish (ハイギョのマヒマヒ, Haigyo no Mahimahi)	1999	One-shot in Weekly Shōnen Jump	
Neko Majin	1999–2005	3 one-shots in Weekly Shōnen Jump and 5 one-shots in Monthly Shōnen Jump, collected into 1 kanzenban	
Hyowtam (ヒョータム, Hyōtamu)	2000	One-shot drawn entirely on a computer for E-Jump, a special edition of Weekly Shōnen Jump focusing on electronics.	
Sand Land	2000	14 chapters serialized in Weekly Shōnen Jump, collected into 1 tankōbon	
This is the Police Station in front of Dragon Park on Planet Namek (こちらナメック星ドラゴン公園前派出所, Kochira Namekku-sei Dragon Kōen-mae Hashutsujo)	2006	1 chapter of Super Kochikame (超こち亀, Chō Kochikame), Kochira Katsushika-ku Kameari Kōen-mae Hashutsujo and Dragon Ball crossover with Osamu Akimoto for 30th anniversary of Kochikame.	
Cross Epoch	2006	One-shot in Weekly Shōnen Jump, Dragon Ball and One Piece crossover with Eiichiro Oda	
Dr. Mashirito – Abale-chan (Dr.MASHIRITO ABALEちゃん)	2007	One-shot in Monthly Shōnen Jump	
Sachie-chan Good!! (さちえちゃんグー!!, Sachie-chan Gū!!)	2008	One-shot in Jump SQ, art by Masakazu Katsura	
Akira Toriyama Mankanzenseki Vol. 1	2008	1 bunkoban, collects previously published one-shots	
Akira Toriyama Mankanzenseki Vol. 2	2008	1 bunkoban, collects previously published one-shots	
Delicious Island's Mr. U (おいしい島のウーさま, Oishii Shima no Ū-sama)	2009	One-shot in the pamphlet Saishū Senryaku Biosphere (最終戦略 バイオスフィア) for the NPO Rural Society Project's "Project 2030" initiative; notable for being Toriyama's only officially released manga not published by Shueisha. Assisted by former assistant Takashi Matsuyama.	
Jiya (JIYA -ジヤ-)	2009–2010	3 chapters in Weekly Young Jump, art by Masakazu Katsura	
Kintoki (KINTOKI-金目族のトキ-, Kintoki – Kinmezoku no Toki)	2010	One-shot in Weekly Shōnen Jump	
Jaco the Galactic Patrolman	2013	11 chapters serialized in Weekly Shōnen Jump, collected into 1 tankōbon	
Katsura & Akira Short Stories (桂正和×鳥山明 共作短編集 カツラアキラ, Katsura Masakazu × Toriyama Akira Tomosaku Tanpenshū: KatsuraAkira)	2014	1 volume, art by Masakazu Katsura, collects previously published one-shots	
Dragon Ball Super	2015–2024	Original concept and story outline, with some storyboards and dialogue. Currently serialized in V Jump, art and dialogue by Toyotarou, collected into 24 tankōbon	

=== Art books ===
- Akira Toriyama: The World (鳥山明 the world; January 10, 1990). ISBN 978-4088581309
- Akira Toriyama: The World Special (鳥山明 THE WORLD SPECIAL; September 19, 1990). ISBN 978-4087824049
- The World of Akira Toriyama: Akira Toriyama Exhibition (鳥山明の世界 AKIRA TORIYAMA EXHIBITION; 1993)
- Dragon Ball Daizenshu: The Complete Illustrations (ドラゴンボール大全集1 COMPLETE ILLUSTRATIONS; Japan: June 20, 1995; North America: October 21, 2008 ISBN 978-1421525662)
- Dragon Quest Monsters: Akira Toriyama Illustrations (ドラゴンクエストモンスターズ 鳥山明イラストレーションズ; December 18, 1996 ISBN 978-4087820171)
- Dragon Quest 25th Anniversary Monster Encyclopedia (ドラゴンクエスト25thアニバーサリー モンスター大図鑑; May 31, 2012 ISBN 978-4757535831)
- Dragon Ball: A Visual History (ドラゴンボール超画集; Japan: May 9, 2013; North America: November 12, 2019 ISBN 978-1974707409)
- Akira Toriyama: Dragon Quest Illustrations (鳥山明 ドラゴンクエスト イラストレーションズ; Japan: May 27, 2016 ISBN 978-4087925081; North America: December 11, 2018 ISBN 978-1974703906)

=== Anime ===
- Crusher Joe (1983, film) – designed the MAX 310 space station
- Kosuke & Rikimaru: The Dragon of Konpei Island (小助さま力丸さま -コンペイ島の竜-; 1988, film) – original concept, script, and character designs
- Imagination Science World Gulliver Boy (1995, television series) – mechanical designs
- Dragon Ball GT (1996–1997, television series) – character designs, title, and logo
- Dragon Ball: Yo! Son Goku and His Friends Return!! (2008, short film) – original concept and story concept
- Dragon Ball Z: Battle of Gods (2013, film) – original concept, story, and character designs
- Dragon Ball Z: Resurrection 'F' (2015, film) – original concept, screenplay, character designs, and title
- Dragon Ball Super (2015–2018, television series) – original concept, story, character designs, and title
- Dragon Ball Super: Broly (2018, film) – original concept, screenplay, and character designs
- Dragon Ball Super: Super Hero (2022, film) – original concept, screenplay, and character designs
- Sand Land: The Series (2024, original net animation) – original concept, "Tenshi no Yūsha" story arc, and designed the characters Anne and Muniel
- Dragon Ball Daima (2024–2025, television series) – original concept, story, and character designs

=== Video games ===
- Dragon Quest series (1986–TBA) – character designs, package illustrations
- Dragon Ball: Shenlong no Nazo (1986) – designed several characters including Kuririan (クリリアン)
- Famicom Jump II: Saikyō no Shichinin (1991) – designed the character Dark Raid (ダークレイド)
- Dragon Ball Z (1993) – designed the game's cabinet
- Dragon Ball Z: V.R.V.S. (1994) – designed the character Ozotto (オゾット)
- Chrono Trigger (1995) – character and setting designs. Alongside Toei Animation, he and his studio also created the animated cutscenes for the 1999 PlayStation port.
- Super Momotaro Dentetsu DX (1995) – designed the character Mecha Bombie RX (メカボンビーRX)
- Tobal No. 1 (1996) – character designs
- Tobal 2 (1997) – character designs
- Blue Dragon (2006) – character designs, and voices the character Toripo (トリッポ)
- Blue Dragon Plus (2008) – character designs
- Blue Dragon: Awakened Shadow (2009) – character designs and voices the character Toripo
- Dragon Ball Heroes (2010) – supervised the design and setting, and designed the three Freeza clan characters
- Chōsoku Henkei Gyrozetter (2012) – designed the Beeman 500SS character
- Dragon Ball FighterZ (2018) – designed the character Android 21
- Dragon Ball Legends (2018) – designed the characters Shallot (シャロット, Sharotto) and Zahha (ザッハ)
- Jump Force (2019) – designed several original characters
- Dragon Ball Z: Kakarot (2020) – designed the character Bonyū
- Fantasian (2021) – designed a diorama used to create a level

=== Shueisha ===
- Weekly Shōnen Jump (1988) – designed the magazine's 20th anniversary character Captain Gyao (キャプテンギャオ), who later appeared in the video game Famicom Jump: Hero Retsuden
- V Jump (1990) – designed the magazine's V Dragon (V龍) character, who later appeared in the video games Dragon Quest X (2012), Gaist Crusher (2013), and Monster Strike (2014).
- Weekly Jump F-1 Club (1990) – designed the Weekly Shōnen Jump column's mascot character Wins-kun (ウインズくん)
- V-Net (1994) – designed the Weekly Shōnen Jump column's mascot characters Dr. Tobo (Dr.トボ) and Happy 1 (ハッピー1)
- Souvenirs entomologiques (Jean-Henri Fabre book, 1996) – cover illustrations for the Shueisha Bunko edition of the Japanese translation
- Shueisha (2002) – designed the Rīdon (リードン) character for the 25th anniversary of Shueisha Bunko
- Dragon Ball Damashii (DB魂; 2004) – designed the V Jump column's logo
- Jump Shop (2005) – designed the Weekly Shōnen Jump online shop's Janta (ジャンタ) character
- Weekly Shōnen Jump (2009) – designed the magazine's website's Kaizo-kun (KAIZOくん) character
- My Jump (2016) – designed the mobile app's Mai (マイ) and Honbot (ホンボット) characters

=== Other works ===
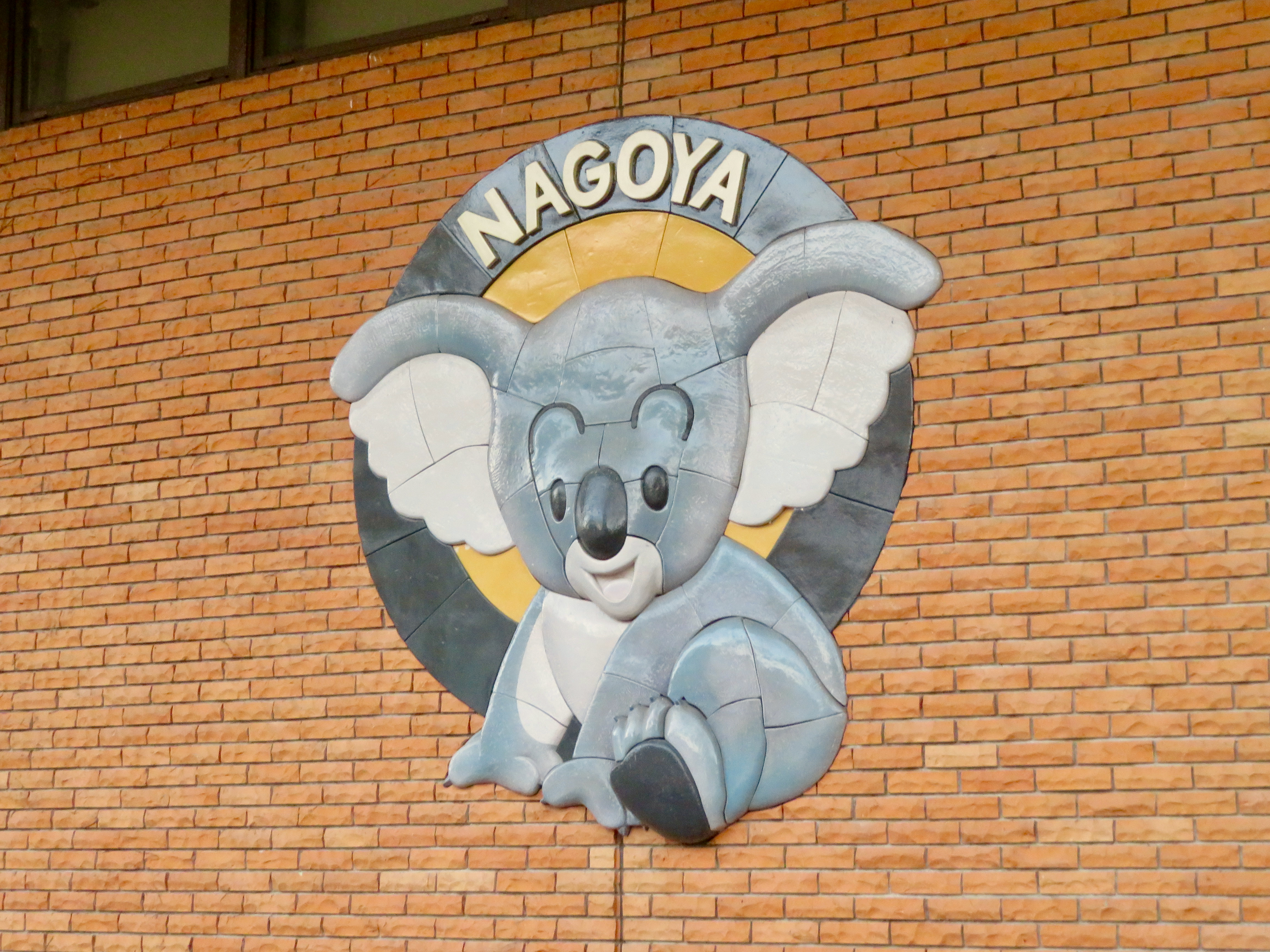
The logo designed by Toriyama for the koala exhibit at the Higashiyama Zoo and Botanical Gardens

- Apache (1977) – designed the jeans store's mascot
- Fuel Album (George Tokoro album, 1981) – insert illustration
- Polkadot Magic (Mami Koyama album, 1984) – album cover and lyrics to "Crilla" and "Helicopter"
- Higashiyama Zoo and Botanical Gardens (1984) – designed the logo for the zoo's koala exhibit
- Fine Molds (1985) – illustrated packaging, instructions, and design of the German Infantry Woman Lisa model kit
- Dakara Bike Daisuki! (だからバイク大好き！; Haruka Takachiho book, 1986) – cover illustration
- Fine Molds (1991) – designed the model maker's mascot Goshikiken (五式犬)
- Super Sense Story (Honda road safety brochure, 1991) – character designs
- Fine Molds (1994) – designed seven of their World Fighter Collection line of models kits, including packaging and instructions
1. WWII German Waffen-SS Soldier
2. WWII U.S. Army Infantryman
3. -The China Incident- Imperial Japanese Army Infantryman First Class Private Ohshimizu
4. WWII U.S.S.R. Army Infantry Woman
5. The Gulf War U.S. Army Infantry Woman Sandy
6. WWII German Army Infantryman Meyer
7. Japan Ground Self Defense Force Member Infantryman Sergeant Unoya
- Bitch's Life Illustration File (art book, 2001) – illustration
- Toccio the Angel (てんしのトッチオ, Tenshi no Totchio; children's book, 2003) – wrote and illustrated the book
- QVOLT (electric car, 2005) – designed the automobile
- "Rule/Sparkle" (Ayumi Hamasaki single, 2006) – an illustration of Ayumi Hamasaki as Son Goku printed on the single's CD and DVD
- Ichigo Dōmei (苺同盟; Chiaki book, 2007) – an illustration of Chiaki for the cover
- Invade (Jealkb album, 2011) – album cover
- Journey to the West: Conquering the Demons (2014) – an illustration of Sun Wukong for a poster for the film's Japanese release
- Dr. Mashirito's Ultimate Manga Techniques (Kazuhiko Torishima book, 2023) – book cover
- Kiyosu (2024) – designed the logo for the city's 20th anniversary
