= Kowa =

Kowa may refer to:

- KOWA-LP, a defunct independent, non-commercial radio station in Olympia, Washington, USA
- Kōwa (Heian period) (康和), a Japanese era name for years spanning 1099 to 1103
- Kōwa (Muromachi period) (弘和), a Japanese era name for years spanning 1381 through 1383
- Kōwa, Japanese pronunciation for ancient Chinese emperors' era names
  - 光和, era name of Emperor Ling of Han from 178 to 184
  - 興和, era name of Emperor Xiaojing of Eastern Wei from 539 to 542
- Kōwa Station (河和駅), a train station in Mihama, Aichi, Japan
- Mount Kowa, Pacaraima Mountains, Guyana
- Kowa (company), a Japanese company working in a variety of industries including pharmaceuticals, chemicals, textiles, real estate, and optics

== See also ==
- Cowa!, a manga by Akira Toriyama
