= List of Dragon Ball manga volumes =

First tankōbon volume cover

Dragon Ball is a Japanese manga series written and illustrated by Akira Toriyama. The story follows the adventures of Son Goku from his childhood through adulthood as he trains in martial arts and explores the world in search of the seven orbs known as the Dragon Balls, which summon a wish-granting dragon when gathered. Along his journey, Goku makes several friends and battles a wide variety of villains, many of whom also seek the Dragon Balls.

The series was serialized as 519 individual chapters in the magazine Weekly Shōnen Jump from November 20, 1984, to May 23, 1995. These chapters were collected by Shueisha in 42 tankōbon volumes; the first released on September 10, 1985, and the last on August 4, 1995. Between December 4, 2002, and April 2, 2004, the manga was re-released in a collection of 34 kanzenban, which included a slightly rewritten ending, new covers, and color artwork from its original magazine run. A sōshūhen edition that aims to recreate the manga as it was originally serialized in Weekly Shōnen Jump with color pages, promotional text, and next chapter previews, was published in 18 volumes between May 13, 2016, and January 13, 2017. There have been two anime adaptations, both produced by Toei Animation; the first, also named Dragon Ball, adapted the first 194 chapters of the manga, while the second is titled Dragon Ball Z and adapted the remaining 325 chapters of the series.

The North American distributing company Viz Media has released all 42 volumes in English. Viz initially titled volumes seventeen through forty-two of the manga Dragon Ball Z to reduce confusion for their readers. They began releasing both series chapter by chapter in a monthly individual single comic book format in 1998, before switching to a graphic novel format in 2000; the last volume of Dragon Ball was released on August 3, 2004, while the last one of Dragon Ball Z was released on June 6, 2006. Between June 2008 and August 2009, Viz re-released both series in a wideban format called "Viz Big Edition", which is a collection of three volumes in one. Between June 2013 and September 2016, they released a new 3-in-1 edition of the series in 14 volumes. This version uses the Japanese kanzenban covers and marks the first time in English that the entire series was released under the Dragon Ball name.

== Volume list ==
=== Dragon Ball ===
No.	Title	Original release date	English release date
1	The Monkey King (Son Goku and Friends); Son Gokū to Nakama-tachi (孫悟空と仲間たち)	September 10, 1985; 978-4-08-851831-2	March 12, 2003; 978-1-56931-920-8
2	Wish Upon a Dragon (A Critical Moment for the Dragon Balls); Doragon Booru Kiki Ippatsu (ドラゴンボール危機一髪)	January 10, 1986; 978-4-08-851832-9	March 12, 2003; 978-1-56931-921-5
3	The Training of Kame-sen'nin (The Tenka'ichi Budōkai Begins!!); Tenkaichi Budōkai Hajimaru!! (天下一武道会はじまる！！)	June 10, 1986; 978-4-08-851833-6	March 12, 2003; 978-1-56931-922-2
4	Strongest Under the Heavens (The Grand Finals); Daikesshōsen (大決勝戦)	October 9, 1986; 978-4-08-851834-3	March 12, 2003; 978-1-56931-923-9
5	The Red Ribbon Army (The Terror of Muscle Tower); Massuru Tawā no Kyōfu (マッスルタワーの恐怖)	January 9, 1987; 978-4-08-851835-0	March 12, 2003; 978-1-56931-924-6
6	Bulma Returns! (Bulma's Big Mistake!!); Buruma no Daishippai!! (ブルマの大失敗!!)	March 10, 1987; 978-4-08-851836-7	March 12, 2003; 978-1-56931-925-3
7	General Blue and the Pirate Treasure (Pursuit!! General Blue); Tsuiseki!! Burū Shōgun (追跡！！ブルー将軍)	May 8, 1987; 978-4-08-851837-4	March 12, 2003; 978-1-56931-926-0
8	Taopaipai and Master Karin (Son Goku's Assault); Son Gokū Totsugeki (孫悟空突撃)	July 10, 1987; 978-4-08-851838-1	May 7, 2003; 978-1-56931-927-7
9	Test of the All-Seeing Crone (When Worried, See Baba Uranai); Komatta Toki no Uranai Baba (こまったときの占いババ)	September 10, 1987; 978-4-08-851839-8	May 7, 2003; 978-1-56931-928-4
10	Return to the Tournament (The 22nd Tenka'ichi Budōkai); Dainijūnikai Tenkaichi Budōkai (第22回天下一武道会)	November 10, 1987; 978-4-08-851840-4	May 7, 2003; 978-1-56931-929-1
11	The Eyes of Tenshinhan (The World's Greatest Super Battle!!); Tenkaichi no Sūpā Batoru!! (天下一のスーパーバトル！！)	February 10, 1988; 978-4-08-851608-0	May 7, 2003; 978-1-56931-919-2
12	The Demon King Piccolo (The Terror of Piccolo Daimao!); Pikkoro Daimaō no Kyōfu! (ピッコロ大魔王の恐怖！)	April 8, 1988; 978-4-08-851609-7	September 3, 2003; 978-1-59116-155-4
13	Piccolo Conquers the Earth (Son Goku's Counterattack!?); Son Gokū no Gyakushū!? (孫悟空の逆襲！？)	June 10, 1988; 978-4-08-851610-3	November 19, 2003; 978-1-59116-148-6
14	Heaven and Earth (Even More Action); Sara Naru Hiyaku (さらなる飛躍)	August 10, 1988; 978-4-08-851611-0	February 18, 2004; 978-1-59116-169-1
15	The Titanic Tournament (Rivals Standing Their Ground!); Gunyū Kakkyo! (群雄割拠！)	December 6, 1988; 978-4-08-851612-7	May 19, 2004; 978-1-59116-297-1
16	Goku vs. Piccolo (The Dragon and Tiger Mutually Strike!); Ryūko Aiutsu! (龍虎相討つ！)	February 10, 1989; 978-4-08-851613-4	August 3, 2004; 978-1-59116-457-9

=== Dragon Ball Z ===
No.	Title	Original release date	English release date
1	The World's Greatest Team (A Never Before Seen Terror); Katsute Nai Kyōfu (かつてない恐怖)	May 10, 1989; 978-4-08-851614-1	March 12, 2003; 978-1-56931-930-7
2	The Lord of Worlds (Son Gohan and Piccolo Daimao); Son Gohan to Pikkoro Daimaō (孫悟飯とピッコロ大魔王)	July 10, 1989; 978-4-08-851615-8	March 12, 2003; 978-1-56931-931-4
3	Earth vs. the Saiyans (Hurry, Son Goku!); Isoge! Son Gokū (いそげ！孫悟空)	November 10, 1989; 978-4-08-851616-5	March 12, 2003; 978-1-56931-932-1
4	Goku vs. Vegeta (A Fateful Super Decisive Battle!!); Tenkawakeme no Chōkessen!! (天下分け目の超決戦)	January 10, 1990; 978-4-08-851617-2	March 12, 2003; 978-1-56931-933-8
5	Dragon Ball in Space (Go For It! The Planet Namek); Mezase! Namekku no Hoshi (めざせ！ナメックの星)	April 10, 1990; 978-4-08-851618-9	March 12, 2003; 978-1-56931-934-5
6	Battlefield Namek (The Namekians' Resistance); Namekkuseijin no Teikō (ナメック星人の抵抗)	July 10, 1990; 978-4-08-851619-6	March 12, 2003; 978-1-56931-935-2
7	The Ginyu Force (The Terrible Ginyu Special-Squad); Kyōfu no Ginyū Tokusentai (恐怖のギニュー特戦隊)	October 8, 1990; 978-4-08-851620-2	March 12, 2003; 978-1-56931-936-9
8	Goku vs. Ginyu (Goku or Ginyu!?); Gokū ka!? Ginyū ka!? (悟空か！？ギニューか！？)	January 10, 1991; 978-4-08-851414-7	May 7, 2003; 978-1-56931-937-6
9	The Wrath of Freeza (Freeza's Super Transformation!!); Furīza Chōhenshin!! (フリーザ超変身！！)	March 8, 1991; 978-4-08-851415-4	May 7, 2003; 978-1-56931-938-3
10	Goku vs. Freeza (Son Goku... Revived!!); Son Gokū...Fukkatsu!! (孫悟空…復活！！)	June 10, 1991; 978-4-08-851416-1	May 7, 2003; 978-1-56931-939-0
11	The Super Saiyan (The Legendary Super Saiyan); Densetsu no Sūpā Saiyajin (伝説の超サイヤ人)	August 7, 1991; 978-4-08-851417-8	May 7, 2003; 978-1-56931-807-2
12	Enter Trunks (The Boy From the Future); Mirai kara Kita Shōnen (未来から来た少年)	November 8, 1991; 978-4-08-851418-5	August 6, 2003; 978-1-56931-985-7
13	The Red Ribbon Androids (Goku, Defeated!); Gokū, Yabureru! (悟空、敗れる！)	March 10, 1992; 978-4-08-851419-2	October 8, 2003; 978-1-56931-986-4
14	Rise of the Machines (Evil Premonition!); Jāku na Yokan (邪悪な予感)	June 10, 1992; 978-4-08-851420-8	December 31, 2003; 978-1-59116-180-6
15	The Terror of Cell (Cell, Stealthily Approaching); Shinobiyoru Seru (忍びよるセル)	August 4, 1992; 978-4-08-851686-8	April 14, 2004; 978-1-59116-186-8
16	The Room of Spirit and Time (Cell's Perfect-Form Achieved!!); Seru no Kanzentai Kansei!! (セルの完全体 完成！！)	November 2, 1992; 978-4-08-851687-5	July 14, 2004; 978-1-59116-328-2
17	The Cell Game (The Cell Games Begin); Seru Geemu Hajimaru (セルゲーム始まる)	December 26, 1992; 978-4-08-851688-2	October 12, 2004; 978-1-59116-505-7
18	Gohan vs. Cell (The Warrior Who Surpassed Goku); Gokū o Koeta Senshi (悟空を越えた戦士)	June 4, 1993; 978-4-08-851689-9	January 4, 2005; 978-1-59116-637-5
19	Death of a Warrior (Goodbye, Warriors); Sayōnara Senshitachi (さようなら戦士たち)	September 3, 1993; 978-4-08-851700-1	April 5, 2005; 978-1-59116-751-8
20	The New Generation (Birth of a New Hero!!); Nyū Hīrō Tanjō!! (ニューヒーロー誕生！！)	November 4, 1993; 978-4-08-851495-6	May 31, 2005; 978-1-59116-808-9
21	Tournament of the Heavens (The Plan Begins Moving); Ugoki Hajimeta Sakusen (動き始めた作戦)	April 4, 1994; 978-4-08-851496-3	August 2, 2005; 978-1-59116-873-7
22	Mark of the Warlock (The Fated Showdown: Son Goku vs Vegeta!!); Shukumei no Taiketsu Son Gokū Tai Bejiita (宿命の対決 孫悟空対ベジータ)	August 4, 1994; 978-4-08-851497-0	October 10, 2005; 978-1-4215-0051-5
23	Boo Unleashed! (Farewell, Pride-filled Warrior); Saraba Hokori Takaki Senshi (さらば誇り高き戦士)	December 2, 1994; 978-4-08-851498-7	December 5, 2005; 978-1-4215-0148-2
24	Hercule to the Rescue (The Earth Army's Last Secret Weapon!!); Chikyūgun, Saigo no Himitsu Heiki!! (地球軍、最後の秘密兵器！！)	March 3, 1995; 978-4-08-851499-4	February 7, 2006; 978-1-4215-0273-1
25	Last Hero Standing! (Do Your Best, Super Gotenks-kun); Ganbare Sūpā Gotenkusukun (がんばれ 超ゴテンクスくん)	June 2, 1995; 978-4-08-851500-7	April 4, 2006; 978-1-4215-0404-9
26	Goodbye, Dragon World! (Bye Bye Dragon World); Baibai Doragon Wārudo (バイバイ ドラゴンワールド)	August 4, 1995; 978-4-08-851090-3	June 6, 2006; 978-1-4215-0636-4

=== Dragon Ball SD ===
Dragon Ball SD is a colored spin-off manga written and illustrated by Naho Ōishi that has been published in Shueisha's Saikyō Jump magazine since its debut issue released in December 2010. The manga is a condensed retelling of Goku's various adventures as a child, with many details changed, in a super deformed art style, hence the title. After four chapters, the quarterly Saikyō Jump switched to a monthly schedule. The chapters published since the monthly switch have been collected into tankōbon volumes since April 4, 2013.

No.	Release date	ISBN
1	April 4, 2013	978-4-08-870648-1
001. "Bulma, Son Goku and the Dragon Balls" (ブルマと悟空とドラゴンボール, Buruma to Gokū to Doragon Bōru); 002. "Transforming Yōkai, Oolong" (変身妖怪ウーロン, Henshin Yōkai Ūron); 003. "Yamcha, Wolf of the Wilderness" (荒野の狼ヤムチャ, Kōya no Ōkami Yamucha); 004. "Gyū-Maō of Fry-Pan Mountain" (フライパン山の牛魔王, Furaipan Yama no Gyūmaō); 005. "Shenlong Appears" (神龍あらわる！, Shenron Arawaru!); 006. "Goku's Great Transformation" (悟空の大変身, Gokū no Dai-Henshin); 007. "Find a Pichi-Pichi Gal!!" (ぴちぴちギャルを探せ！！, Pichi-Pichi Gyaru o Sagase!!); 008. "The Training Begins!!" (修行開始！！, Shugyō Kaishi!!); 009. "The Curtain Rises on the Tenka'ichi Budōkai!!!" (天下一武道会開幕！！！, Tenka'ichi Budōkai Kaimaku!!!)
2	April 4, 2014	978-4-08-880020-2
010. "Offense and Defense! Kuririn vs. Jackie" (大攻防！ クリリンVSジャッキー, Dai-Kōbō! Kuririn Bāsasu Jakkī); 011. "The Grand Finals!!" (大決勝戦！！, Dai-Kesshōsen!!); 012. "The Tenka'ichi Budōkai in a Great Uproar!!!" (天下一武道会大騒然！！！, Tenka'ichi Budōkai Dai-Sōzen!!!); 013. "Struggle for the Dragon Balls" (ドラゴンボール争奪戦, Doragon Bōru Sōdatsusen); 014. "Confrontation! Ninja Murasaki!" (対決！ 忍者ムラサキ, Taiketsu! Ninja Murasaki); 015. "The End of Muscle Tower!!" (マッスルタワーの最期！！, Massuru Tawā no Saigo!!); 016. "Let's Find the Dragon Balls" (探そうぜ！ ドラゴンボール, Sagasō ze! Doragon Bōru); 017. "General Blue Begins His Attack" (攻撃開始！ ブルー将軍, Kōgeki Kaishi! Burū Shōgun); 018. "A Pirate Ghost Appears?!" (海賊の亡霊あらわる！？, Kaizoku no Bōrei Arawaru!?)
3	December 4, 2014	978-4-08-880236-7
019. "Clash! The Shining Eyes of General Blue!!" (激突！ 光る瞳のブルー将軍！！, Gekitotsu! Hikaru Hitomi no Burū Shōgun!!); 020. "The Great Escape!!" (大脱出！！, Dai-Dasshutsu!!); 021. "The Holy Land of Karin" (聖地カリン, Seichi Karin); 022. "Brutal! The Assassin 'Taopaipai'" (残虐！ 殺し屋"桃白白", Zangyaku! Koroshiya "Taopaipai"); 023. "Karin-sama of Karin Tower" (カリン塔のカリン様, Karin Tō no Karin-sama); 024. "Steal! The Super Holy Water!!" (うばえ！ 超聖水！！, Ubae! Chō-Seisui!!); 025. "Great Battle in the Holy Land!!!" (聖地の大決戦！！！, Seichi no Dai-Kessen!!!); 026. "Assault on Red Ribbon Headquarters!!" (突撃！ レッドリボン軍総本部！！, Totsugeki! Reddo Ribon Gun Sō-Honbu!!); 027. "Son Goku Marches Forward" (孫悟空快進撃！, Son Gokū Kai-Shingeki!); 028. "A Great Victory!!!" (大勝利！！！, Dai-Shōri!!!)
4	February 4, 2016	978-4-08-880612-9
029. "The Location of the Dragon Ball" (龍球のゆくえ); 030. "A Great Bloody Battle" (大流血戦); 031. "Terrifying! The Devilmite Beam" (恐怖！ アクマイト光線); 032. "The Man in the Kitsune Mask" (キツネ面の男); 033. "Son Gohan" (孫悟飯); 034. "Once Again, Shenlong!!" (神龍再び!!); 035. "Tail Training!" (シッポ修業！); 036. "An Unexpected Reunion" (意外な再会); 037. "The Qualifying Rounds Begin!!!" (予選開始!!!); 038. "Yamcha VS Tenshinhan" (ヤムチャVS天津飯)
5	February 2, 2018	978-4-08-881446-9
039. "Kuririn VS the Dodon-Pa!!" (クリリンvsどどん波!!); 040. "Evenly Matched!!" (実力伯仲!!!); 041. "Son Goku VS Kuririn!!!" (孫悟空vsクリリン!!!); 042. "The World's Greatest Hyper Battle!!" (天下一のハイパーバトル!!); 043. "The Final Battle! The Winner is...?!" (最後の決戦！ 優勝は...!?); 044. "Reunion with Brother?! And..." (兄との再会!? そして...); 045. "Son Goku and Demon King Piccolo" (孫悟飯とピッコロ大魔王); 046. "Kaiō-sama and Harsh Training!" (界王さまと荒修業！); 047. "The Saiyans Finally Attack!!" (サイヤ人、ついに襲来!!); 048. "The Warriors' Battle to the Death!!!" (戦士たちの死闘!!!)
6	June 4, 2019	978-4-08-882003-3
7	February 4, 2021	978-4-08-882519-9
8	April 4, 2022	978-4-08-883114-5
9	March 3, 2023	978-4-08-883490-0
10	April 4, 2024	978-4-08-883767-3
11	February 4, 2025	978-4-08-884362-9

=== Dragon Ball Super ===
No.	Title	Original release date	English release date
1	Warriors from Universe 6! Dai-Roku Uchū no Senshi-tachi (第6宇宙の戦士たち)	April 4, 2016; 978-4-08-880661-7	May 2, 2017; 978-1-4215-9254-1
2	The Winning Universe Is Decided! Yūshō Uchū, Tsui ni Kettei!! (優勝宇宙、ついに決定！！)	December 2, 2016; 978-4-08-880867-3	December 5, 2017; 978-1-4215-9647-1
3	Zero Mortal Project! Ningen Zero Keikaku (人間ゼロ計画)	June 2, 2017; 978-4-08-881084-3	July 3, 2018; 978-1-4215-9946-5
4	Last Chance for Hope; Hōpu e no Rasuto Chansu (HOPEへのラストチャンス)	November 2, 2017; 978-4-08-881163-5	January 1, 2019; 978-1-9747-0144-5
5	The Decisive Battle! Farewell, Trunks! Kessen! Saraba Torankusu (決戦！さらばトランクス)	March 2, 2018; 978-4-08-881447-6	May 7, 2019; 978-1-9747-0458-3
6	The Super Warriors Gather! Atsumare Chō Senshi-Tachi！ (集まれ超戦士たち！)	June 4, 2018; 978-4-08-881501-5	September 3, 2019; 978-1-9747-0520-7
7	Universe Survival! The Tournament of Power Begins!! Uchū Sabaibaru! Chikara no Taikai Kaishi! (宇宙サバイバル！力の大会開始！)	September 4, 2018; 978-4-08-881575-6	December 3, 2019; 978-1-9747-0777-5
8	Sign of Son Goku's Awakening; Son Gokū Kakusei no "Kizashi" (孫悟空覚醒の“兆”)	December 4, 2018; 978-4-08-881649-4	March 3, 2020; 978-1-9747-0941-0
9	Battle's End and Aftermath; Ketchaku to Ketsumatsu (決着と結末)	April 4, 2019; 978-4-08-881811-5	June 2, 2020; 978-1-9747-1236-6
10	Moro's Wish; Moro no Negai (モロの願い)	August 2, 2019; 978-4-08-882034-7	September 1, 2020; 978-1-9747-1526-8
11	Great Escape; Dai Dassō Dai Dassō (大だい脱走だっそう)	December 4, 2019; 978-4-08-882154-2	December 1, 2020; 978-1-9747-1761-3
12	Merus's True Identity; Merusu no Shōtai (メルスの正体)	April 3, 2020; 978-4-08-882264-8	March 2, 2021; 978-1-9747-2001-9
13	Battles Abound; Sorezore no Tatakai (それぞれの戦い)	August 4, 2020; 978-4-08-882391-1	June 1, 2021; 978-1-9747-2281-5
14	Son Goku, Galactic Patrol Officer; Ginga Patorōru Son Gokū (銀河パトロール孫悟空)	December 4, 2020; 978-4-08-882518-2	September 7, 2021; 978-1-9747-2463-5
15	Moro, Consumer of Worlds; Hoshi-kui no Moro (星ほし喰くいのモロ)	April 2, 2021; 978-4-08-882606-6	January 4, 2022; 978-1-9747-2517-5
16	The Universe's Greatest Warrior; Uchūichi no Senshi (宇宙一の戦士)	August 4, 2021; 978-4-08-882744-5	August 2, 2022; 978-1-9747-3211-1
17	God of Destruction Power; Hakaishin no Chikara (破壊神の力)	December 3, 2021; 978-4-08-882858-9	December 6, 2022; 978-1-9747-3451-1
18	Bardock, Father of Goku; Gokū no Chichi Bādakku (悟空の父バーダック)	April 4, 2022; 978-4-08-883092-6	June 6, 2023; 978-1-9747-3652-2
19	A People's Pride; Minzoku no Hokori (民族の誇り)	August 4, 2022; 978-4-08-883215-9	September 5, 2023; 978-1-9747-3910-3
20	All-Out Bout; Zenryokusen (全ぜん力りょく戦せん)	March 3, 2023; 978-4-08-883470-2	February 6, 2024; 978-1-9747-4360-5
21	Vs. Dr. Hedo; Taiketsu Dr. Hedo (対決Dr.ヘド)	August 4, 2023; 978-4-08-883601-0	May 14, 2024; 978-1-9747-4686-6
22	The Ultimate Teacher and Pupil; Saikyō no Shitei (最強の師弟)	December 4, 2023; 978-4-08-883744-4	December 3, 2024; 978-1-9747-4985-0
23	Son Gohan's Ultimate Awakening! Chō Kakusei! Son Gohan (超覚醒！孫悟飯)	April 4, 2024; 978-4-08-883885-4	April 29, 2025; 978-1-9747-5281-2
24	A Legacy Toward the Future; Mirai e no Keishō (未来への継承)	April 4, 2025; 978-4-08-884493-0	March 3, 2026; 978-1-9747-6224-8

=== Super Dragon Ball Heroes: Ankoku Makai Mission! ===
Super Dragon Ball Heroes: Ankoku Makai Mission! (スーパードラゴンボールヒーローズ 暗黒魔界ミッション！, Sūpā Doragon Bōru Hīrōzu Ankoku Makai Misshon!) is a manga written and illustrated by Yoshitaka Nagayama. It began serialization in the September 2016 issue of Saikyō Jump, which was released on August 5, 2016. It is a tie-in to the card-based arcade game Super Dragon Ball Heroes. Shueisha began collecting the chapters into tankōbon volumes with the first published on May 2, 2017.

No.	Title	Japanese release date	Japanese ISBN
1	Dispatch! Time Patrol; Shutsudō! Taimu Patorōru (出(しゅつ)動(どう)！タイムパトロール)	May 2, 2017	978-4-08-881110-9
1. "Dispatch! Time Patrol" (出(しゅつ)動(どう)！タイムパトロール, Shutsudō! Taimu Patorōru); 2. "Dark Dragon Ball" (暗(あん)黒(こく)ドラゴンボール, Ankoku Doragon Bōru); 3. "Potara" (ポタラ, Potara); 4. "The Unknown Cell" (X(未知)なるセル, Ekkusu-naru Seru); 5. "Dark Demon God Boo" (暗(あん)黒(こく)魔(ま)神(じん)ブウ, Ankoku Majin Bū)
2	Time of the Ankoku Makai's Resurrection; Ankoku Makai Fukkatsu no Toki (暗(あん)黒(こく)魔(ま)界(かい)復(ふっ)活(かつ)の時(とき))	May 2, 2018	978-4-08-881487-2
6. "Ruler of the Ankoku Makai" (暗(あん)黒(こく)魔(ま)界(かい)の長(おさ), Ankoku Makai no Naga); 7. "The Fifth Demon God a Man Known as the Grim Reaper" (第(だい)5(ご)魔(ま)神(じん)。死(しに)神(がみ)と呼(よ)ばれた男(おとこ)。, Dai-go Majin. Shinigami to Yoba Reta Otoko.); 8. "The Dark Giant" (暗(あん)黒(こく)の巨(きょ)人(じん), Ankoku no Kyojin); 9. "The Last Dark Dragon Ball" (最(さい)後(ご)の暗(あん)黒(こく)ドラゴンボール, Saigo no Ankoku Doragon Bōru); 10. "Time of the Ankoku Makai's Resurrection" (暗(あん)黒(こく)魔(ま)界(かい)復(ふっ)活(かつ)の時(とき), Ankoku Makai Fukkatsu no Toki); Bonus: "The Masked Warriors" (仮(か)面(めん)の戦(せん)士(し)たち, Kamen no Senshi-tachi)
3	Complete Resurrection; Kanzen Fukkatsu (完(かん)全(ぜん)復(ふっ)活(かつ))	May 13, 2020	978-4-08-882312-6
11. "Complete Resurrection" (完(かん)全(ぜん)復(ふっ)活(かつ), Kanzen Fukkatsu); 12. "Gogeta vs. Dark Gogeta" (ゴジータvs(バーサス)暗(あん)黒(こく)ゴジータ, Gojīta Bāsasu Ankoku Gojīta); 13. "The Gates of Hell" (地(じ)獄(ごく)の門(もん), Jigoku no Mon); 14. "Key Sword" (キーソード, Kī Sōdo); 15. "The Divine Power" (神(かみ)の力(ちから), Kami no Chikara); 16. "The Final Battle" (最(さい)終(じゅう)決(けつ)戦(せん), Saishū Kessen)

=== Dragon Ball: That Time I Got Reincarnated as Yamcha ===
Dragon Ball: That Time I Got Reincarnated as Yamcha (ドラゴンボール外伝 転生したらヤムチャだった件, Doragon Bōru Gaiden: Tensei-shitara Yamucha Datta Ken) is a three-chapter spin-off manga written and illustrated by dragongarow LEE about a high school boy who wakes up after an accident in the body of Yamcha in the Dragon Ball manga. Knowing what comes later in the story, he trains as Yamcha to make him the strongest warrior. It was serialized in the digital Shōnen Jump+ magazine from December 12, 2016, to August 14, 2017. Shueisha collected the chapters into a single tankōbon volume on November 2, 2017. Viz licensed the series for English publication and released the collected volume on November 6, 2018.

No.	Original release date	Original ISBN	English release date	English ISBN
1	November 2, 2017	978-4-08-881261-8	November 6, 2018	978-1-9747-0371-5

=== Super Dragon Ball Heroes: Universe Mission!! ===
Super Dragon Ball Heroes: Universe Mission!! (スーパードラゴンボールヒーローズ ユニバースミッション!!, Sūpā Doragon Bōru Hīrōzu Yunibāsu Misshon) is a manga written and illustrated by Yoshitaka Nagayama. It began serialization in Saikyō Jump on April 6, 2018. It is a tie-in to the card-based arcade game Super Dragon Ball Heroes. Shueisha began collecting the chapters into tankōbon volumes with the first published on May 2, 2019.

No.	Title	Japanese release date	Japanese ISBN
1	Prison Planet; Kangoku Wakusei (監獄(かんごく)惑星(わくせい))	May 2, 2019	978-4-08-881850-4
1. "Prison Planet" (監獄惑星, Kangoku Wakusei); 2. "Evil Saiyan" (悪のサイヤ人, Aku no Saiyajin); 3. "Vs. Kanbā" (VSカンバー, Bāsasu Kanbā); 4. "Kaiō-ken vs. Ōzaru" (界王拳VS大猿, Kaiō-ken Bāsasu Ōzaru); 5. "Dragon Ball Contest Winner" (ドラゴンボール争奪戦の勝者, Doragon Bōru Sōdatsusen no Shōsha); 6. "Universal Conflict" (宇宙争乱, Uchū Sōran)
2	Universe Seed; Uchū no Tane (宇(う)宙(ちゅう)の種(たね))	May 13, 2020	978-4-08-882311-9
7. "Universe 11's Decisive Battle" (第(だい)11宇(う)宙(ちゅう)の決(けっ)戦(せん), Dai Jū Ichi Uchū no Kessen); 8. "Counterattack" (反(はん)撃(げき), Hangeki); 9. "Evolution" (進(しん)化(か), Shinka); 10. "Universe Seed" (宇(う)宙(ちゅう)の種(たね), Uchū no Tane); 11. "The Ultimate Form" (究(きゅう)極(きょく)形(けい)態(たい), Kyūkyoku Keitai); 12. "The Final Battle" (最(さい)終(じゅう)決(けつ)戦(せん), Saishū Kessen)

=== Super Dragon Ball Heroes: Big Bang Mission!!! ===
Super Dragon Ball Heroes: Big Bang Mission!!! (スーパードラゴンボール ヒーローズ ビッグバンミッション！！！, Sūpā Doragon Bōru Hīrōzu Biggu Ban Misshon!!!) is a manga written and illustrated by Yoshitaka Nagayama. It began serialization in Saikyō Jump on April 2, 2020. It is a tie-in to the card-based arcade game Super Dragon Ball Heroes. Shueisha began collecting the chapters into tankōbon volumes with the first published on December 4, 2020.

No.	Title	Japanese release date	Japanese ISBN
1	Big Bang Mission; Biggu Ban Misshon (ビッグバンミッション)	December 4, 2020	978-4-08-882517-5
1. "The Bird of Catastrophe" (災(わざわ)いの鳥(とり), Wazawai no Tori); 2. "The Scientist from Hell" (地(じ)獄(ごく)の研(けん)究(きゅう)者(しゃ), Jigoku no Kenkyūsha); 3. "Limit Break" (限(げん)界(かい)突(とっ)破(ぱ), Genkaitoppa); 4. "Big Bang Mission" (ビッグバンミッション, Biggu Ban Misshon)
2	The New Universe; Aratana Uchū (新(あら)たな宇(う)宙(ちゅう))	August 4, 2021	978-4-08-882745-2
5. "The Dark King" (暗(あん)黒(こく)王(おう), Ankokuō); 6. "The New Universe" (新(あら)たな宇(う)宙(ちゅう), Aratana Uchū); 7. "New Space-Time War" (新(しん)時(じ)空(くう)大(たい)戦(せん), Shinjikū Taisen); 8. "Saiyan's Pride" (サイヤ人(じん)の誇(ほこ)り, Saiya-jin no Hokori)
3	End of Experiment; Jikken Shūryō (実(じっ)験(けん)終(しゅう)了(りょう))	April 4, 2022	978-4-08-883059-9
9. "Kuririn vs. Dr. W" (クリリンVS(バーサス)Dr． (ドクター)W(ダブリュー), Kuririn Bāsasu Dokutā Daburyū); 10. "Son Gohan vs. Bojack" (孫(そん)悟(ご)飯(はん)VS(バーサス)ボージヤツク, Son Gohan Bāsasu Bojakku); 11. "The Evil Saiyan vs. the Destruction King" (惡(あく)のサイヤ 人(じん)VS(バーサス)破(は)壞(かい)王(おう), Aku no Saiya-jin Bāsasu Hakai-ō); 12. "Gogeta vs. the Crimson-Masked Saiyan" (ゴジータVS(バーサス)紅(あか)き仮(か)面(めん) のサイヤ 人(じん), Gojīta Bāsasu Akaki Kamen no Saiya-jin); 13. "Xeno Gogeta vs. the Dark King" (ゴジータ：ゼノVS(バーサス)暗(あん)黒(こく)王(おう), Gojīta ： Zeno Bāsasu Ankokuō); 14. "The 2 Son Gokus" (2( ふ)人(たり)の孫(そん)悟(ご)空(くう), Futari no Son Gokū); 15. "End of Experiment" (実(じっ)験(けん)終(しゅう)了(りょう), Jikken Shūryō)

=== Super Dragon Ball Heroes: Avatars!! ===
Super Dragon Ball Heroes: Avatars!! (スーパードラゴンボールヒーローズ アバターズ!!, Sūpā Doragon Bōru Hīrōzu Abatāzu!!) is a manga written and illustrated by Yuuji Kasai. It is a tie-in to the card-based arcade game Super Dragon Ball Heroes. It was serialized in Saikyō Jump from August 4, 2021, to September 4, 2024.

No.	Japanese release date	Japanese ISBN
1	April 4, 2022	978-4-08-883060-5
2	December 2, 2022	978-4-08-883405-4
3	August 4, 2023	978-4-08-883653-9
4	April 4, 2024	978-4-08-883887-8
5	December 4, 2024	978-4-08-884139-7

=== Super Dragon Ball Heroes: Ultra God Mission!!!! ===
Super Dragon Ball Heroes: Ultra God Mission!!!! (スーパードラゴンボールヒーローズ ウルトラゴッドミッション！！！！, Sūpā Doragon Bōru Hīrōzu Urutora Goddo Misshon!!!!) is a manga written and illustrated by Yoshitaka Nagayama. It is a tie-in to the card-based arcade game Super Dragon Ball Heroes. It was serialized in Saikyō Jump from March 4, 2022, to October 4, 2023.

No.	Title	Japanese release date	Japanese ISBN
1	Begin! Super Space-Time Tournament; Kaimaku! Chō Jikū Tōnamento (開(かい)幕(まく)！超(ちょう)時(じ)空(くぅ)トーナメント)	December 2, 2022	978-4-08-883353-8
1. "Begin! Super Space-Time Tournament" (開(かい)幕(まく)！超(ちょう)時(じ)空(くぅ)トーナメント, Kaimaku! Chō Jikū Tōnamento); 2. "Intruder" (乱(らん)入(にゅう)者(しゃ), Rannyūsha); 3. "Aeos" (アイオス, Aiosu); 4. "The Warriors in Black" (黒(こく)衣(い)の戦(せん)士(し)たち, Kokui no Senshi-tachi); 5. "Vs. the Future Warrior in Black" (VS(バーサス)黒(こく)衣(い)の未(み)来(らい)戦(せん)士(し), Bāsasu Kokui no Mirai Senshi)
2	Vs. the Former Kaiō-shin of Time; Bāsasu Moto Toki no Kaiōshin (VS(バーサス)元(もと)時(とき)の界(かい)王(おう)神(しん))	August 4, 2023	978-4-08-883577-8
6. "Vs. the Female Warrior in Black" (VS(バーサス)黒(こく)衣(い)の女(おんな)戦(せん)士(し), Bāsasu Kokui no On'na Senshi); 7. "Vs. the Namekian Warrior in Black" (VS(バーサス)黒(こく)衣(い)のナメック戦(せん)士(し), Bāsasu Kokui no Namekku Senshi); 8. "Vs. the Warrior in Black" (VS(バーサス)黒(こく)衣(い)の戦(せん)士(し), Bāsasu Kokui no Senshi); 9. "Vs. the Former Kaiō-shin of Time" (VS(バーサス)元(もと)時(とき)の界(かい)王(おう)神(しん), Bāsasu Moto Toki no Kaiōshin); 10. "Vs. Aeos" (VS(バーサス)アイオス, Bāsasu Aiosu)
3	The Kaiō-shin of Time vs. the Demigra Army; Toki no Kaiōshin Bāsasu Domigura-Gun (時(とき)の界(かい)王(おう)神(しん)VS(バーサス)ドミグラ軍(ぐん))	August 4, 2023	978-4-08-883768-0
11. "Goku vs. Super Yī Xīng Lóng: Xeno" (悟(ご)空(くう)VS(バーサス)超(スーパー)一(イー)星(シン)龍(ロン)：ゼノ, Gokū Bāsasu Sūpā Ī Shinron: Zeno); 12. "Gogeta: Xeno vs. Super Yī Xīng Lóng: Xeno" (ゴジータ：ゼノVS(バーサス)超(スーパー)一(イー)星(シン)龍(ロン)：ゼノ, Gojīta: Zeno Bāsasu Sūpā Ī Shinron: Zeno); 13. "Gogeta: Xeno vs. Broly" (ゴジータ：ゼノVS(バーサス)ブロリー, Gojīta: Zeno Bāsasu Burorī); 14. "The Kaiō-shin of Time vs. the Demigra Army" (時(とき)の界(かい)王(おう)神(しん)VS(バーサス)ドミグラ軍(ぐん), Toki no Kaiōshin Bāsasu Domigura-Gun); 15. "Vs. History's Dark Warriors Legion" (VS(バーサス)歴(れき)史(し)の暗(あん)黒(こく)戦(せん)士(し)軍(ぐん)団(だん), Bāsasu Rekishi no Ankoku Senshi Gundan)
4	Heimaku! Chō Jikū Tōnamento (閉(へい)幕(まく)！ 超(ちょう)時(じ)空(くぅ)トーナメント)	April 4, 2024	978-4-08-883886-1

=== Super Dragon Ball Heroes: Meteor Mission! ===
Super Dragon Ball Heroes: Meteor Mission! (スーパードラゴンボールヒーローズ メテオミッション！, Sūpā Doragon Bōru Hīrōzu Meteo Misshon!) is a manga written and illustrated by Yoshitaka Nagayama. It is a tie-in to the card-based arcade game Super Dragon Ball Heroes. It was serialized in Saikyō Jump from November 4, 2023, to October 4, 2024.

No.	Japanese release date	Japanese ISBN
1	August 2, 2024	978-4-08-884138-0
2	December 4, 2024	978-4-08-884318-6
