= Chiisana Obake Acchi, Kocchi, Socchi =

1990s anime television series

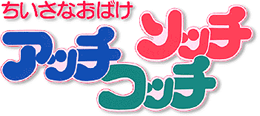

小さなおばけアッチ・コッチ・ソッチ
- Genre: Comedy, Supernatural
- Anime television series
- Directed by: Osamu Kobayashi
- Produced by: Toru Horikoshi (NTV); Akira Miyauchi (Hakuhodo); Michiyuki Honma (Studio Pierrot)
- Written by: Shigemitsu Taguchi
- Music by: Takeshi Ike
- Studio: Studio Pierrot
- Original network: NNS (NTV)
- Original run: April 9, 1991 – March 31, 1992
- Episodes: 50
- icon

Chiisana Obake Acchi, Kochi, Sochi (Japanese: ちいさなおばけアッチ・コッチ・ソッチ; lit. "Little Ghosts, There, Here and Where") is an anime television series by Studio Pierrot. The 50-episode series aired on Nippon Television from April 1991 to August 1992. It is based on the Little Ghosts book series published by Poplar.

The story is about three mischievous obake who have taken up different jobs. They mostly cause mischief through their neighborhood.

The anime was dubbed by Saban under the title "Three Little Ghosts" and was widely distributed to Poland, Scandinavia (mostly Sweden) and some hispanic american countries.

== Characters ==
Acchi (アッチ, Acchi; Bumper in the English version)
A cook who lives in an attic. He enjoys cooking and eating in general. Voiced by Yōko Teppōzuka (Japanese); Sonja Ball (English).
Kocchi (コッチ, Kocchi; Cutter in the English version)
A hairdresser who is very skilled. Voiced by Akiko Yajima (Japanese); Sonja Ball (English).
Socchi (ソッチ, Socchi; Sally in the English version)
The only female of the obake. She enjoys eating sweets. Voiced by Taeko Kawata (Japanese); Patricia Rodriguez (English).

== See also ==
- List of ghost films
