= Sangatsu Manga =

Finnish publishing company

The logo of Sangatsu Manga.

Sangatsu Manga is a major manga publisher in Finland. It was a division of Tammi Publishers until it became part of H-Town in 2023. In 2003 it became the first Finnish publisher to sell manga (Dragon Ball, respectably) in convenience stores and supermarkets, which triggered the current wave of manga publishing in Finland.

== Manga published by Sangatsu Manga ==
- .hack//Legend of the Twilight
- Astro Boy - Tetsuwan Atom
- Attack on Titan
- Bleach
- Chi's Sweet Home
- Dragon Ball
- Dragon Ball Z (Films comic)
- Dream Kiss
- Emma
- Fullmetal Alchemist
- Fruits Basket
- Howl's Moving Castle (Films comic)
- Inspector Akane Tsunemori
- Kajika
- Naruto
- My Hero Academia
- Nausicaä of the Valley of the Wind
- Neon Genesis Evangelion
- One Piece
- Sandland
- Tales from Earthsea (Films comic)
- Tokyo Mew Mew
- Tokyo Mew Mew à la Mode
- Trinity Blood
- Your name
- Yu-Gi-Oh!
- Zodiac P.I.
