= Yōko Teppōzuka =

Japanese voice actress

- 鉄炮塚 葉子
- Born: May 7, 1964 (age 62); Shimodate, Ibaraki, Ibaraki Prefecture, Japan
- Other name: Youko Teppouzuka
- Occupation: Voice actress
- Years active: 1991–present

Yōko Teppōzuka (鉄炮塚 葉子, Teppōzuka Yōko; born May 7, 1964 in Shimodate, Ibaraki at Ibaraki Prefecture) is a Japanese voice actress. She started acting in 1991 and she is affiliated with Aoni Production.

== Career ==
She has been working as a stage actor in addition to her voice activity, as she was enrolled in a long time presided over by Nachi Nozawa, as the seat theater companies rose. She's also been active for a long time at theater presided over by a pair set by Yukimasa Kishino but in which, he has now been withdrawn from affiliation.

== Filmography ==
=== Anime television series ===
- Anpanman (xxxx) - Mochitsuki White Man (primary), and Cat (2nd generation)
- Atashin'chi (2002) - Yamashita
- Crayon Shin-chan (xxxx) - Ryoko
- Detective Conan (2016) - Kōhei Ohno
- Inuyasha (2002) - Karan
- Little Ghosts, There, Here, and Where (1991) - Acchi
- Mahō Sensei Negima! (2005) - Chachazero
- Marude Dameo (1991–92) - Dameo Marude
- Mars Daybreak (2004) - Shie
- Microman: The Small Giant (1999) - Yūta Kuji
- Ranma ½ (1991) - Additional voices (Episode 98)
- Sonic X (2003) - Charmy Bee
- Moomin (1990) - Yeti
- World Trigger (2014) - Vittano

=== Anime OVAs ===
- Detective Conan: Conan and Kid and Crystal Mother (2004) - Phillip
- Go! Go! Ackman (1994) - Angel
- Let's Go! Tomica Boys (2009) - Tetsuo
- Let's Go! Tomica Boys F5 (2010) - Tetsuo, Masmatics
- Mahō Sensei Negima!: Shiroki Tsubasa Ala Alba (2009) - Chachazero (episode 3)
- Three Little Ghosts (1991) - Acchi
- Tokimeki Memorial (xxxx) - Yuko Asahina
- Tomica Daisakusen (2017) - Tkun, Toppy
- Tomica Kingdom Story (2006) - Toppy
- Welcome to Pia Carrot 2 (1998) - Jun Kagurazaka

=== Anime films ===
- Doraemon: Nobita and the Winged Braves (2001) - Gusuke's Little Brother
- Dr. Slump and Arale-chan: N-cha! Clear Skies Over Penguin Village (1993) - Gatchans, Peasuke Soramame
- Dr. Slump and Arale-chan: N-cha! From Penguin Village with Love (1993) - Gatchans
- Dr. Slump and Arale-chan: Hoyoyo!! Follow the Rescued Shark... (1994) - Gatchans
- Dr. Slump and Arale-chan: N-cha!! Excited Heart of Summer Vacation (1994) - Gatchans
- Go! Go! Ackman (1994) - Tenshi-kun
- Tomica Plarail movie festival (2013) - Tkun, Doctor, Waludakoboon

=== Tokusatsu ===
- Tokusou Sentai Dekaranger (2004) - Chanbenarian Gin

=== Video games ===
- Castlevania: Rondo of Blood (1993) - Maria Renard
- Battle Arena Toshinden series (1995) - Ellis, Sofia
- Granblue Fantasy (2025) - Chachazero
- Summon Night 2 (2001) - Juel
- Summon Night 4 (2006) - Juel
- Sonic the Hedgehog series - Charmy Bee (2003-Current)
  - Sonic Heroes (2003)
  - Shadow the Hedgehog (2005)
  - Mario & Sonic at the Olympic Winter Games (2009) - (Nintendo DS version)
  - Sonic Colors (2010, Nintendo DS version)
  - Sonic Generations (2011)
  - Mario & Sonic at the London 2012 Olympic Games (2011)
  - Sonic Forces (2017)
- NeoGeo Battle Coliseum (2005) - Ai
- Tokimeki Memorial (1994) - Yuko Asahina
