= Kajika =

Japanese manga series

- Tankōbon volume cover, featuring Kaijika

カジカ
- Genre: Adventure, comedy
- Manga
- Written by: Akira Toriyama
- Published by: Shueisha
- Imprint: Jump Comics
- Magazine: Weekly Shōnen Jump
- Original run: July 7, 1998 – September 29, 1998
- Volumes: 1

Kajika (カジカ) is a Japanese manga series written and illustrated by Akira Toriyama. It was originally serialized in Weekly Shōnen Jump in 1998, with the twelve chapters collected into a single tankōbon volume by Shueisha. Although it has not been licensed for an English-language release, Kajika has been translated and published in several European territories.

== Plot ==
Kajika is the story of the title protagonist and his quest to return to being a normal boy. As a member of the Kawa Tribe (カワ族, Kawazoku), Kajika is extremely strong and has special powers. As a child, Kajika was very evil. His greatest known evil was chasing after a defenseless fox and smashing it with a giant rock. Upon being killed, the spirit of the fox cursed Kajika and Kajika was turned into a fox-man. Kajika was then kicked out of his village because of his monstrous appearance, and the only way to break the curse was to save the lives of 1,000 life forms. The spirit of the dead fox, named Gigi, decided to accompany Kajika on his journey. Upon saving 1,000 life forms, Kajika will go back to being a boy and Gigi will once again get its body back.

After five years of saving life forms, the team only has ten more lives to save. One day, Kajika runs across a girl and saves her from a gang of bad guys. After defeating the gang, Kajika then uses a special power to remove all of their evil, turning them good. Kajika learns that the girl he saved is named Haya, and is told that the guys were after her because of the Dragon Egg she possesses. The Dragon egg is extremely rare and was stolen by the gang leader Gibachi from Ronron Island (ロンロン島). Haya then went to Sumakia and stole it from Gibachi. She then went on a quest to return the egg. Gibachi tries to kill Haya and recover the egg. Haya then asks Kajika to help her on her quest.

Kajika, Giri, and Haya travel to RonRon Island to return the Dragon Egg. Gibachi seeks the egg because of the belief that drinking the blood of a young dragon grants extraordinary powers. The dragon also has Dragomin in its blood, which causes it to mature rapidly. Haya leaves the group during the journey because she fears Hibachi. Kajika and Giri continue toward the island while being pursued by Isaza, an assassin and member of the Kawa tribe. It is also revealed that Kajika's transformation into a fox-man suppresses some of his natural abilities.

== Characters ==
Kajika (カジカ)
Gigi (ギギ)
Haya (ハヤ)
Isaza (イサザ)
Donko (ドンコ)
Gibachi (ギバチ)

== Media ==
=== Manga ===
Written and illustrated by Akira Toriyama, Kajika was serialized in Weekly Shōnen Jump magazine from issue #32 to #44 of 1998. The twelve chapters were collected into one tankōbon volume that was released on January 8, 1999, by Shueisha.

Kajika has been translated and released in foreign countries, such as in France by Glénat, Spain by Planeta DeAgostini, Malaysia by Comics House, Finland by Sangatsu Manga, and in Germany, Sweden and Denmark by Carlsen Verlag.

==== Chapter list ====
No.	Release date	ISBN
01	January 8, 1999	4-08-872658-8
Chapter 01: Norowareta Kajika (呪われたカジカ); Chapter 02: Gibachi no Yabō (ギバチの野望); Chapter 03: Kajika to Isaza (カジカとイサザ); Chapter 04: Daisan no Otoko (第3の男); Chapter 05: Isaza no Jitsuryoku (イサザの実力); Chapter 06: Donko no Sakusen (ドンコの作戦); Chapter 07: Kajika no Shokku (カジカのショック); Chapter 08: Gibachi no Doragon Pawā (ギバチのドラゴンパワー); Chapter 09: Tokeru ka!? Noroi (解けるか!?呪い); Chapter 10: Kessen! Kajika tai Gibachi (決闘!カジカ対ギバチ); Chapter 11: Kajika no Mayoi (カジカの迷い); Chapter 12: Yasashii Kajika (やさしいカジカ)

== Reception ==
Animerica Extra columnist Patricia Duffield stated that Kajika was regularly stocked in Japanese bookstores within the United States. She described Kajika as a highly entertaining adventure story due to Toriyama's easy-to-follow writing and comic style and for possessing "the art of a master of action".
