= Cowa! =

Japanese manga series by Akira Toriyama

- Tankōbon volume cover
- Genre: Adventure; Comedy; Supernatural
- Manga
- Written by: Akira Toriyama
- Published by: Shueisha
- English publisher: NA: Viz Media
- Imprint: Jump Comics
- Magazine: Weekly Shōnen Jump
- Original run: 1997 – 1998
- Volumes: 1
- icon

Cowa! (stylized in all caps) is a Japanese manga series written and illustrated by Akira Toriyama. It was serialized in Shueisha's Weekly Shōnen Jump from 1997 to 1998, with the fourteen chapters collected into a single tankōbon volume. The story follows the child monsters Paifu, José and Arpon, and the human Maruyama, as they travel to get medicine to save their town from a deadly flu. Viz Media released the single volume in North America in July 2008. Cowa! was generally well-received by critics, and was nominated for the 2009 Eisner Award for Best Publication for Kids.

== Plot ==
José (background left) and Paifu as they advance to steal a watermelon from a field.

Paifu, a mischievous monster boy, lives in harmony with his friend José and rival Arpon. This tranquil village life is interrupted by the spread of a Monster Flu (お化け風邪, Obake Kaze), which kills monsters within a month. The doctor reveals that the cure can be created by a witch that resides at the top of Horned-Owl Mountain. Due to the adult monsters being sick, Paifu, José and Arpon volunteer to make the trip with the help of Maruyama, a human who lives near the town and is widely feared due to rumors that he killed a man. Paifu tricks him by telling him that the town will pay him a million yen in exchange for his accompaniment. During the trip, the children encounter several thugs, whom Maruyama easily defeats, and they soon learn that this is a former sumo wrestler.

In the last village before reaching the mountain, Maruyama stops to buy food. At that moment, Paifu witnesses an assault on an old man and stops the assailant. As they are about to reach Mount Owl, Arpon suddenly falls ill. Their search for someone to take care of him leads them to the family of the man who was assaulted, who gladly agree to take care of Arpon. When the group reaches the forest around the mountain, they encounter Baroaba, whom they manage to defeat when Paifu learns to whistle, the monster's weakness. When Baroaba realizes that they are going to see the witch, he helps them reach her house. Before entering they are greeted by the witch's servant, an oni named Leonardo, who grants them entry only after they answer a riddle. The group retrieves the medicine and begins their descent down the mountain, during which Maruyama accidentally slips and falls; Paifu narrowly saves his life by learning to fly.

On the way back, Maruyama is disappointed to learn that Paifu lied about the monetary reward, but decides that Paifu's rescue was sufficient compensation. The group's return is heralded with a party, but Maruyama leaves, claiming not to enjoy such activities. Paifu takes the opportunity to explain to everyone what has happened, and together they manage to fix an old ghost ship to present to Maruyama, fulfilling his wish to obtain one with the promised money.

== Characters ==
Paifu and José meeting Maruyama.

Paifu (パイフー)
Paifu is a half-vampire half-werekoala. When he observes any cross-like figure for more than three seconds, Paifu shapeshifts into a crazed and powerful were-koala and can only change back to his normal state after looking at a round object. Despite being part vampire, he can not fly because he skipped flying practice.
José Rodriguez (ホセ・ロドリゲス, Hose Rodorigesu)
José is a ghost that can fly, turn invisible and change shape.
Mako Maruyama (丸山真虎, Maruyama Mako)
Maruyama is an overweight human feared by even the monsters in town. He was a sumo wrestler with the ringname "The Volcano" (活火山, Katsukazan; lit. 'Active Volcano') until killing an opponent during a match. Paifu gives him the nickname "Makoleen" (マコリン, Makorin).
Arpon (アーポン, Āpon)
Arpon is a monster boy the constantly challenges Paifu to fights and loses.
Doctor (お化けの医者, Obake no Isha)
The old and forgetful doctor of Batwing Ridge.
Baroaba (バロアバ)
The monster that lives in the forest at the foot of Horned-Owl Mountain. He is large with a rubber-like body, unless he hears whistling, in which case he shrinks and loses the rubber-like property.
Leonardo (レオナルド, Reonarudo)
The assistant of the Witch on top of Horned-Owl Mountain. He either fights or gives a riddle to anyone trying to enter the Witch's house.
Witch (魔女, Majo)
Witch living on top Horned-Owl Mountain and maker of the medicine that heals Monster Flu.

== Production ==
Cowa! has its origins in Bubul of Demon Village (魔人村のBUBUL, Majin-Mura no Buburu), a one-shot Akira Toriyama drew for the revived Jump Readers' Cup competition in 1997. Toriyama, who had done only a few one-shots since finishing Dragon Ball in 1995, won handily; it was his first win since Pola & Roid took the top spot in 1981. After winning, Toriyama said he was thinking of creating a "more developed" form of Bubul of Demon Village. He re-tooled the character designs and setting of the one-shot to suit a new series, as detailed in the issue before Cowa!'s start.

Despite previously claiming to be done with weekly serials, Toriyama decided to draw Cowa! when he learned his editor would be Kazuhiko Torishima and that he could do things his own way. Unlike both Dr. Slump and Dragon Ball, where he never skipped an issue, he drew Cowa in a three-weeks-on, one-week-off pattern, which afforded him time to rest and work more slowly. Toriyama stated he wanted to draw everything himself, forgoing the customary use of an assistant, even though he had pain in his arm. The story came about from wanting to take a storybook type approach and have the main character be an "unlovable grumpy guy."

== Release ==
Written and illustrated by Akira Toriyama, Cowa! was serialized in Weekly Shōnen Jump magazine from issue #48 of 1997 to #15 of 1998. The fourteen chapters were collected into one tankōbon volume that was released on May 1, 1998, by Shueisha.

Viz Media licensed Cowa! for English release in North America on July 1, 2008. Their graphic novel edition retained the first chapter in color. It has also been released in other countries, such as in France by Glenat, Spain by Planeta DeAgostini, South Korea by Daewon C.I. and Malaysia Comics House.

=== Chapters ===
No.	Original release date	Original ISBN	English release date	English ISBN
01	May 1, 1998	4-08-872557-3	July 1, 2008	1-42151-805-8
Chapter 01: "Paifu Goes on an Errand" (パイフーのおつかい, Paifū no Otsukai); Chapter 02: "The Unhaunted House" (オバケのきもだめし, Obake no Kimodameshi); Chapter 03: "Paifu and Arpon" (パイフーとアーポン, Paifū to Āpon); Chapter 04: "Monster Flu" (オバケ風邪, Obake Kaze); Chapter 05: "Off to Horned-Owl Mountain" (みみずく山に出発, Mimizuku Yama ni Shuppatsu); Chapter 06: "Mako "The Murderer" Maruyama" (やっぱりこわい丸山真虎, Yappari Kowai Maruyama Mako); Chapter 07: "The Road Goes On" (旅は順調, Tabi wa Junchō); Chapter 08: "The Volcano Awakens" (活火山うごく, Katsukazan); Chapter 09: "The Scary Monster in the Woods" (恐怖の森のモンスター, Kyofū no Mori no Monsutā); Chapter 10: "Makoleen, the Strongest Man in the World, Struggles" (世界最強の男マコリン苦戦, Sekai Saikyō no Otoko Makorin Kusen); Chapter 11: "At the Witch's House" (魔女の家到着, Majo no ie Tōchaku); Chapter 12: "The Medicine Is Ours!" (特効薬いただき!, Tokkōyaku Itadaki!); Chapter 13: "Go, Go, Paifu!" (がんばれパイフー, Ganbare Paifū); Chapter 14: "Makoleen's Boat" (マコリンの船, Makorin no Fune)

== Reception ==
About.com's Deb Aoki listed Cowa! as the "Best New All Ages Manga" of 2008, calling it "clever and charming enough to entertain adults as well as younger readers." Anime News Network's Carl Kimlinger disagreed, claiming the plot is not complex enough to appeal to adults. He also wished Viz would have kept the other few chapters that were originally colored as such instead of just the first, as those particular ones were hard to follow in black and white. However, he wrote that "Makoleen's character elevates what might have been a simple children's adventure to a gentle fable about acceptance and understanding." and praised the humor. A.E. Sparrow of IGN gave the series an 8.6 out of 10 and referred to it as a "self-contained mini-epic." On the humor he said "the jokes come at you unapologetically and you're either going to catch them or write them off." Viz Media's English release of Cowa! was nominated for the Eisner Award for Best Publication for Kids in 2009.
