= Go! Go! Ackman =

Japanese manga series

- Cover of Akira Toriyama's Manga Theater Vol. 3, featuring Ackman and Gordon

ゴーゴーアックマン (Gō Gō Akkuman)
- Manga
- Written by: Akira Toriyama
- Published by: Shueisha
- English publisher: NA: Viz Media
- Magazine: V Jump
- Original run: July 7, 1993 – October 1994
- Anime film
- Directed by: Takahiro Imamura
- Produced by: Kozo Morishita
- Written by: Takao Koyama
- Studio: Toei Animation
- Released: July 28, 1994
- Runtime: 15 minutes
Further information
Video game
| Developer | Banpresto |
| Publisher | Banpresto |
| Genre | Action |
| Platform | Super Famicom |
| Released | December 23, 1994 |
Video game
Go Go Ackman 2
| Developer | Banpresto |
| Publisher | Banpresto |
| Genre | Action |
| Platform | Super Famicom |
| Released | July 21, 1995 |
Video game
Go Go Ackman 3
| Developer | Banpresto |
| Publisher | Banpresto |
| Genre | Action |
| Platform | Super Famicom |
| Released | December 15, 1995 |
Video game
| Developer | Banpresto |
| Publisher | Banpresto |
| Genre | Action |
| Platform | Game Boy |
| Released | August 25, 1995 |

Go! Go! Ackman (Japanese: ゴーゴーアックマン, Hepburn: Gō Gō Akkuman) is a Japanese manga series written and illustrated by Akira Toriyama. It was published irregularly in V Jump for 11 chapters from July 1993 to October 1994. Go! Go! Ackman is a humorous series about a demon child named Ackman who harvests souls for the Great Demon King. It was adapted into an animated short film and several video games. Viz Media released the manga in North America on December 7, 2021, as part of Akira Toriyama's Manga Theater.

== Plot summary ==
Ackman, a short demonic child, wakes up after a 50-year nap. Since he is now 200 years old, his parents explain that it is time he starts killing humans and selling their souls to the Great Demon King. Gung-ho about killing, Ackman ends up spending most of his time wandering around looking for goodhearted young women to kill as their pure souls are worth more, only to be embarrassed after finding out that they are actually immodest.

Ackman's nemesis Tenshi-kun, a Cherub-like angel who thought he was dead, is shocked to find Ackman has started killing. Tenshi-kun repeatedly tries to kill Ackman throughout the series but fails miserably. One example is him trying to hit Ackman with a missile, but missing and killing a school bus full of school children. Upon learning of Ackman's weakness to bawdiness, Tenshi-kun hires a stripper, which works, until the stripper is revealed to have a penis.

Ackman bumps into the female demon Witchney (マージョ, Mājo) when selling souls to the Great Demon King, and after learning of the extraordinary amount she earned, he proposes marriage. More than twice his age and already in a relationship, Witchney tells the annoying Ackman she will accept if he defeats her boyfriend. When he does so easily, it is Witchney's turn to be infatuated. The series ends with Ackman running from his wife that same night after she tried to initiate romance in the bedroom.

== Characters ==
Ackman (アックマン, Akkuman)

Voiced by: Megumi Urawa

A 200-year-old demon child without a nose, who has just awoken from a 50-year nap. He gets embarrassed around immodest women.
Gordon (ゴードン, Gōdon)

Voiced by: Bin Shimada

A talking bat-winged creature that accompanies Ackman. His main purpose is to gather the souls of the people Ackman kills in a jar.
Tenshi-kun (天使くん)

Voiced by: Yōko Teppōzuka

Ackman's angel rival. He constantly tries to kill Ackman and stop him from killing humans, but often causes their deaths himself instead.

== Publication ==
Published irregularly between July 1993 to October 1994, Go! Go! Ackman is written and illustrated by Akira Toriyama. The manga is eleven chapters long, with each chapter being five pages long. Toriyama said the story was fun to draw, and because it is short, he was able to finish Go! Go! Ackman before getting sick of it. When printed in Shueisha's V Jump magazine, all of the pages were in color. When collected in Akira Toriyama's Manga Theater Vol. 3 on August 4, 1997, they were greyscaled. The series would receive another reprint in Akira Toriyama Mankanzenseki 1 on August 8, 2008. Go! Go! Ackman was released in English by Viz Media on December 7, 2021, as part of their single volume Akira Toriyama's Manga Theater.

== Adaptations ==
=== Anime adaptation ===
In 1994, the series was adapted into a fifteen-minute animated film shown at V Jump Festa. The film managed to retell the first few chapters involving Ackman's bouts with Tenshi-kun and the first two hired thugs. A few frames from the later chapters were used during the closing credits.

=== Video game adaptations ===
The manga has been adapted into a series of three console based platform video games for the Super Famicom. The first of these was more closely based on the comics. The second pitted Ackman against an angelic rock group called the Metal Angels. The last saw Ackman face a flamboyant police officer, and teaming up with his longtime rival Tenshi-kun. Both characters were playable and could be switched between. These games were action platformers, with gameplay vaguely similar to Mega Man. All three Super Famicom games have received English fan translations. There was also a handheld game for the Game Boy that was a maze chase game like Pac-Man.

== Reception ==
Reviewing Akira Toriyama's Manga Theater for Anime News Network, Christopher Farris singled out Go! Go! Ackman for being "very entertaining and funny all the way through." The Game Boy video game received a rating of 26/40 by Famicom Tsūshin.

== Appearances in other media ==
Ackman is briefly seen in several Toriyama-related works. He is seen in The Brief Return of Dr. Slump, in the background of an episode of Dragon Ball Z, in Dragon Ball SD and in the fourth chapter of Dragon Ball Heroes: Victory Mission.
