= Pink (1982 manga) =

Japanese manga

- Title page, featuring Pink (center), and (clockwise from top right) Cobalt Blue, Black, White, and Silver

ピンク (Pinku)
- Genre: Action, romantic comedy
- Manga
- Written by: Akira Toriyama
- Published by: Shueisha
- English publisher: NA: Viz Media
- Magazine: Fresh Jump
- Published: October 23, 1982
- Anime film

Pink: Water Bandit, Rain Bandit
- Directed by: Toyoo Ashida
- Produced by: Tamio Kojima
- Written by: Aya Matsui
- Music by: Takeshi Ike
- Studio: Toei Animation
- Released: July 7, 1990
- Runtime: 31 minutes

Pink (Japanese: ピンク, Hepburn: Pinku), subtitled The Rain Jack Story, is a Japanese one-shot manga written and illustrated by Akira Toriyama. It was published in the December 1982 issue of Shueisha's Fresh Jump magazine on October 23, 1982. Pink was released in North America by Viz Media on December 7, 2021, as part of Akira Toriyama's Manga Theater. Toei Animation adapted the manga into an anime film in 1990 titled Pink: Water Bandit, Rain Bandit (Pink みずドロボウあめドロボウ, Pinku Mizu Dorobō Ame Dorobō).

== Plot summary ==
A young girl named Pink makes a living as a mysterious bandit stealing water from the shady Silver Company, which she keeps for herself. Despite a year-long drought, the Silver Company has somehow managed to make a profit by selling a steady supply of water at outrageous prices, thus making them perfect targets for the thief.

Due to Pink's young feminine physique and her face being concealed behind goggles, her opponents all assume the bandit is a small guy. After numerous thefts, the head of the company, Silver, calls the local sheriff Cobalt Blue to apprehend the bandit and bring them to justice. With little information to go by, Blue goes in search of the bandit. He comes across Pink's home, which he finds suspicious, as there is a floater bike and a lush palm tree thriving amidst the drought. He asks her a few questions, but realizes nothing despite all the evidence around him. Pink is all too willing to answer his questions as she is smitten by him.

Later that night, after having a dream about her and Blue walking together with her parents' umbrella in the rain, Pink heads out to the Silver Company for one last big heist. Meanwhile, Cobalt Blue finally puts together that the bandit and Pink are the same person and goes after her. Pink performs a frontal assault on the company and defeats most of the forces, but meets her match against a professional assassin.

Just as she is about to be killed, Cobalt Blue steps in and saves Pink. At that moment, White finds Kaminari locked up in the basement. It turns out the drought was the result of the Silver Company holding Kaminari prisoner and forcing him to make water for them to sell. With Kaminari free, he proceeds to make up for lost time and produces rain. Unfortunately, he goes overboard and the manga ends with the land being completely flooded. But Pink finally has Blue all to herself in her parents' umbrella, which they use as a boat.

== Characters ==
Pink (ピンク, Pinku)
Voiced by: Mia Masuda
A young girl whose parents died two years ago. She lives in a house with her friends Black and White. She is skilled at using guns and floater bikes and loves baths.
Black (ブラック, Burakku)
Voiced by: Keiko Yamamoto
Pink's slothful, talking lizard-like friend.
White (ホワイト, Howaito)
Voiced by: Kazuko Sugiyama
Pink's talking flying robot friend, which specializes in reconnaissance.
Cobalt Blue (コバルト・ブルー, Kobaruto Burū)
Voiced by: Keiichi Nanba
A famous sheriff whom Pink has a crush on.
Silver (シルバー, Shirubā)
Voiced by: Hitoshi Takagi
Head of the Silver Company.

== Publication ==
Written and illustrated by Akira Toriyama, Pink is a one-shot manga published in the December 1982 issue of Shueisha's Fresh Jump magazine on October 23, 1982. The author said that it was created at a time when he was no longer afraid to draw girls, and wanted to experiment with the girlish side of the title character. Pink was later included in 1988's Akira Toriyama's Manga Theater Vol. 2. The series would receive another reprint in Akira Toriyama Mankanzenseki 2 on September 18, 2008. The one-shot was released in English by Viz Media on December 7, 2021, as part of their single volume Akira Toriyama's Manga Theater.

== Anime ==
Theatrical poster for the anime film showing the revamped appearances of some of the characters

Nearly eight years after Pink was first published, Toei Animation produced an anime film adaptation titled Pink: Water Bandit, Rain Bandit. Several character designs were changed by director Toyoo Ashida, including those of Pink, Cobalt Blue and Kaminari. Ashida changed Pink from a teenager to a young girl and before he could tell the original author, Toriyama sent him a redesign showing her younger as well; the two were thinking the same thing without knowing it. It was shown exclusively as part of the Akira Toriyama: The World event at the July 7, 1990 Toei Anime Fair alongside two other Toriyama properties, Young Master Ken'nosuke and Dragon Ball Z: The Tree of Might. The film was distributed on home video on March 8, 1991, as a double feature along with Young Master Ken'nosuke. Music from the film was released as part of the Akira Toriyama: The World and Pink Songs & BGM albums. In May 1994, Shueisha published an anime comic of Pink and Young Master Ken'nosuke.

== Reception ==
Reviewing Akira Toriyama's Manga Theater for Comic Book Resources, Jonathon Greenall singled out Pink as a highlight of the collection.

== Allusions to other works ==
Pink has similarities to other Toriyama stories such as 1981's Pola & Roid and the 2000 series Sand Land. The title character can also be compared to the early depiction of the Dragon Ball character Yamcha, as both are thieves who live in the desert and have companionship with unusual talking creatures.
