= Akira Toriyama's Manga Theater =

Japanese manga anthology by Akira Toriyama

- Cover of Akira Toriyama's Manga Theater Vol. 1

鳥山明○作劇場 (Toriyama Akira Marusaku Gekijō)
- Manga
- Written by: Akira Toriyama
- Published by: Shueisha
- English publisher: NA: Viz Media
- Imprint: Jump Comics
- Original run: July 8, 1983 – August 4, 1997
- Volumes: 3

Akira Toriyama's Manga Theater (Japanese: 鳥山明○作劇場(とりやまあきらマルさくげきじょう), Hepburn: Toriyama Akira Marusaku Gekijō; lit. 'Akira Toriyama's (Fill-in-the-blank)-piece Theater') is a Japanese manga anthology consisting of three tankōbon volumes released between 1983 and 1997 that collect several one-shots written and illustrated by Akira Toriyama. The stories were originally published in various Shueisha magazines between 1978 and 1994.

Four stories featured in the series – Pink, Young Master Ken'nosuke, Soldier of Savings Cashman, and Go! Go! Ackman – were adapted into short anime films. The three volumes were re-released with the suffix Kai (改; "updated" or "altered") added to the title as part of the Shueisha Jump Remix imprint between June 2003 and 2004. The Manga Theater series has been released in several European countries, including France and Italy. Viz Media licensed the anthology for North American release as a single hardcover volume on December 7, 2021.

== Production ==
The original Japanese title of the series translates to "Akira Toriyama's ____piece Theater", and Akira Toriyama wrote that readers can fill in the blank with whatever they want. In the second volume, the author revealed that while he has created a number of one-shots, he begs to get out of doing anything more than 15 pages, so their page-counts are lower than the standard amount and therefore it takes time to compile enough to fill a volume.

After quitting his previous job, 23-year old Toriyama entered the manga industry by submitting a work to a contest held by Weekly Shōnen Jump magazine in order to win the prize money. While it did not win, Kazuhiko Torishima, who would become his editor, contacted him and encouraged him to keep drawing. The result was Wonder Island (1978), which became Toriyama's first published work, although it came in last place. Wonder Island 2 includes parodies of Dirty Harry and Ultraman, in addition to kaiju and science fiction movies. Although Toriyama had planned to quit manga after getting paid, because Wonder Island 2 was also a "flop," he said his stubbornness would not let him and he continued to draw failed stories for a year; claiming around 500, including the published Today's Highlight Island. He said he learned a lot during this year and when Torishima told him to draw a female lead character, Toriyama hesitantly created Tomato the Cutesy Gumshoe (1979), which had some success. Feeling encouraged, he decided to draw another female lead and created Dr. Slump. Dr. Slump would later feature many characters similar to the ones seen in Today's Highlight Island.

Within roughly six months of creating the popular Dr. Slump in 1980, Toriyama wanted to end the series but his publisher Shueisha would only allow him to do so if he agreed to start another serial for them shortly after. So he worked with Torishima on several one-shots for Weekly Shōnen Jump and the monthly Fresh Jump, but none were particularly successful. In 1981, Toriyama was one of ten artists selected to create a 45-page work for Weekly Shōnen Jump's Reader's Choice contest. Used to doing 13 to 15-page chapters, he struggled with the deadline and so drew it all with an "autograph pen." Nonetheless, his manga Pola & Roid took first place. January 1982's Escape was created in two days and designed to resemble American comics. Toriyama was selected to participate in the Reader's Choice contest again in 1982 and submitted Mad Matic. In addition to his assistant Hisuwashi, he also utilized a mecha expert named Tanigami for the manga. It was inspired by the Australian film Mad Max 2, which was released the previous year. Toriyama said that Pink (1982) was created at a time when he was no longer afraid to draw girls, and wanted to experiment with the girlish side of the title character.

Selected to participate in Weekly Shōnen Jump's Reader's Choice contest for a third time, Toriyama had the bad luck of drawing the first slot and had to work over New Year's on 1983's Chobit. The title character was created based on the American television show I Dream of Jeannie. Angry that it was unpopular, he decided to try again and created Chobit 2 with his assistant Matsuyama. The sequel was influenced by Spaghetti Western films, which Toriyama enjoys. Torishima suggested that, as Toriyama enjoyed kung fu films, he should create a kung fu shōnen manga. The artist was inspired by Hong Kong martial arts films such as Bruce Lee's Enter the Dragon (1973) and Jackie Chan's Drunken Master (1978). This led to the two-part Dragon Boy, published in the August and October 1983 issues of Fresh Jump. It follows a boy, adept at martial arts, who escorts a princess on a journey back to her home country. Toriyama's wife was fond of China and he used materials she had as reference, in addition to having her help draw the backgrounds. Dragon Boy was well-received and evolved to become the serial Dragon Ball in 1984. 1983's The Adventure of Tongpoo also features elements that would be included in Dragon Ball, such as "capsules."

Because Dragon Ball has a Chinese feel, Toriyama gave 1987's Young Master Ken'nosuke (1987) a Japanese jidaigeki setting. Toriyama said he created The Elder (1988) because he wanted to draw a Suzuki Jimny. Although he enjoys drawing old men, the author said that the car is the protagonist. 1988's Little Mamejiro was initially planned to be a sequel to Young Master Ken'nosuke, but ultimately turned into an original work. Toriyama blended jidaigeki and modern elements for the setting of 1989's Karamaru and the Perfect Day, which was created for the commemorative 1,050th issue of Weekly Shōnen Jump.

== Publication ==
=== Volume 1 ===
The first installment, Akira Toriyama's Manga Theater Vol. 1, was published on July 8, 1983. Re-released under the Shueisha Jump Remix imprint in June 2003.

- Wonder Island (ワンダー・アイランド, Wandā Airando)

After being stuck on Wonder Island for 35 years, former World War II kamikaze pilot Furusu (古巣(ふるす)) enlists P-Man (ピーマン) to help him finally leave. Toriyama's debut work, published in Weekly Shōnen Jump issue #52 of 1978.

- Wonder Island 2 (ワンダー・アイランド2, Wandā Airando Tsū)

Two unnamed policemen and their chief enlist the help of Detective Herring (ハリー・センボン, Harī Senbon), sending him to catch a criminal on Wonder Island. Published in the January 25, 1979, bonus issue of Weekly Shōnen Jump.

- Tomato the Cutesy Gumshoe (ギャル刑事トマト, Gyaru Deka Tomato)

Police officer Slump is paired with the incompetent, 18-year-old rookie Tomato Akai (赤井十真都(あかいとまと)), who apprehends the criminal Kenta Kuraaku. Published in the August 15, 1979, bonus issue of Weekly Shōnen Jump.

- Pola & Roid

Pola hires space taxi driver Roid and the two end up fighting the evil emperor Gaganbo (ガガンボ). Published in Weekly Shōnen Jump issue #17 of 1981. Toriyama's winning entry in the magazine's Reader's Choice Award.

- Mad Matic

An unnamed man and his flying dog meet Nivea (ニベア) and Muhi (ムヒ), the lone survivors of a village, and help them combat the Gungun Army (グングン軍). Published in Weekly Shōnen Jump issue #12 of 1982. Toriyama's second entrance in the magazine's Reader's Choice Award.

- Chobit

The small alien Chobit (チョビット) lands on earth and aids Mugifumi Yamano (山野麦文), the young police officer of Tonton Village, with her supernatural powers. One-shot published in Weekly Shōnen Jump issue #10 of 1983. Toriyama's third entrance in the magazine's Reader's Choice Award.

- Chobit 2

Chobit and the Yamano family move to Tan Tan Town where she helps Mugifumi capture a wanted criminal. Published in the June 1983 issue of Fresh Jump.

=== Volume 2 ===
The second installment, Akira Toriyama's Manga Theater Vol. 2, was published on March 10, 1988. Re-released under the Shueisha Jump Remix imprint in July 2003.

- Today's Highlight Island (本日のハイライ島, Honjitsu no Hairai-tō)

While eating lunch at school, Kanta (カン太) gets a toothache and is taken to see the island's doctor. Published in the April 20, 1979, special issue of Weekly Shōnen Jump.

- Escape

On the planet Umekobucha in the year 2070, a young female is being pursued. Published in the January 1982 special issue of Weekly Shōnen Jump.

- Pink

In a land plagued by a drought, a young girl named Pink makes a living as a bandit stealing water. Published in the December 1982 issue of Fresh Jump on October 23, 1982.

- Dragon Boy (騎竜少年(ドラゴンボーイ), Doragon Bōi)

A young boy adept in martial arts named Tangtong (唐童(たんとん)) escorts a princess on a journey back to her home country. Two chapters published in the August and October 1983 issues of Fresh Jump.

- The Adventure of Tongpoo (トンプー大冒険, Tonpū Dai Bōken)

Tongpoo, a cyborg who emergency lands on an alien planet, and Plamo (プラモ, Puramo), a young girl who crashed on the same planet two years ago, attempt to steal a spaceship to get home. Published in Weekly Shōnen Jump issue #52 of 1983.

- Mr. Ho (Mr.ホー)

A former soldier agrees to help a young boy fight off the Chai (チャイ) gang. When the boy's sister is kidnapped by the gang, Mr. Ho heads to her rescue. Published in Weekly Shōnen Jump issue #49 of 1986.

- Young Master Ken'nosuke (剣之介さま, Kennosuke-sama)

After agreeing to go on a date, kindergartner Ken'nosuke has his friend Shinobimaru (忍丸) teach him what one is. Published in Weekly Shōnen Jump issue #38 of 1987.

- The Elder (そんちょう, Sonchoh)

Elder Tetsunoshin Kataiwa (硬岩鉄之進), who patrols Ponpon Village for anything amiss, pursues a fellow motorist after seeing him litter. Published in Weekly Shōnen Jump issue #5 of 1988.

=== Volume 3 ===
The third installment, Akira Toriyama's Manga Theater Vol. 3, was published on August 4, 1997. Re-released under the Shueisha Jump Remix imprint in June 2004.

- Little Mamejiro (豆次郎くん, Mamejirō-kun)

Angered by his father, six-year-old Mamejiro Kintoki (金時豆次郎) decides to become a juvenile delinquent and asks his friend from the city to teach him how. Published in Weekly Shōnen Jump issue #38 of 1988.

- Karamaru and the Perfect Day (空丸くん日本晴れ, Karamaru-kun Nihonbare)

Young ninja Karamaru travels to town to sell mushrooms for his sick grandfather and meets a thief proclaiming to be a ninja. Published in Weekly Shōnen Jump issue #13 of 1989.

- Soldier of Savings Cashman (貯金戦士 CASHMAN, Chokin Senshi Kyasshuman)

After crash landing on earth, alien police officer Diora (ジオラ) impersonates a local police officer while secretly acting as the superhero Cashman (キャッシュマン), who saves people in exchange for money, with the goal of saving up enough to buy fuel for his spaceship. Three chapters published in V Jump on December 12, 1990, June 26, 1991, and November 27, 1991, when it was still only a special issue of Weekly Shōnen Jump. A remake, written by Takao Koyama, illustrated by Katsuyoshi Nakatsuru, and supervised by Toriyama, was serialized in V Jump from June 1997 to December 1998.

- Dub & Peter 1

Dub and his technically advanced car Peter 1 (ピーター1, Pītā Wan) rescue a girl from thugs and race them. Four chapters (all but the second one created in full color) published in the November 22, 1992, December 30, 1992, February 21, 1993, and April 4, 1993, issues of V Jump.

- Go! Go! Ackman

A demon child named Ackman combats his angel nemesis while harvesting souls for the Great Demon King. Eleven chapters published in V Jump between July 1993 and October 1994.

== Reception ==
Jonathon Greenall of Comic Book Resources wrote that Manga Theater proves there is far more to Akira Toriyama than Dragon Ball. "In fact, it displays how much range Toriyama has as he can create fascinating worlds and memorable characters within a few short pages." Greenall cited Pink as a highlight of the collection and described Wonder Island 2 as a "reference-packed romp full of pop-culture parodies".

Anime News Network had both Christopher Farris and Rebecca Silverman review the single volume English release of Akira Toriyama's Manga Theater. Giving it a 4.5 out of 5 rating, Farris wrote that while the different manga cover a "pretty wide net" as far as their content and appeal, most feature the comedic sensibilities that made Toriyama famous with Dr. Slump. He enjoyed seeing how the author's comedy evolved alongside his art and his anecdotes on creating the stories. Farris noted how impressed he was to see how strong Toriyama's comedy chops "always were" and at the "balance" he had achieved by the time of Go! Go! Ackman. Silverman gave the collection a 3 out of 5 rating and speculated that how much a reader enjoys the book is likely to be determined by how much they enjoy Toriyama's signature "goofy science-fiction, potty humor," and unintelligent characters. She explained that while he does all of that quite well, the works span a large period of his career but do not show an impressive range in terms of storytelling variety. Silverman criticized the female characters as poorly written and suggested the book be read in moderation because the stories and gags start to feel repetitive after a while.

== Related works ==
In 2008, Shueisha released a two-volume bunkoban series of Toriyama's short works, entitled Yum! Yum! Toriyama (鳥山明 満漢全席, Toriyama Akira Mankanzenseki; lit. 'An Emperor's Feast of Akira Toriyama'). This version includes the two-chapter Alien X Peke (1996), published after the end of Dragon Ball, as well as the full-color seinen manga Lady Red (1987), which is read left-to-right. The second volume also includes The Anime and Me (1989), a full-color autobiographical strip from the first Dragon Ball Z Anime Special magazine, as well as a new afterword by the author. The first volume was published on August 8, 2008, and the second on September 18, 2008.

In 2014, a release collecting Toriyama's collaborations with Masakazu Katsura was published. Both Sachie-chan Good!! (2008) and Jiya (2009–10) were written by Toriyama and illustrated by Katsura. Katsura & Akira Short Stories (桂正和×鳥山明 共作短編集 カツラアキラ, Katsura Masakazu × Toriyama Akira Tomosaku Tanpenshū KatsuraAkira) was published on April 4, 2014, and includes an interview with the two authors.

Mankanzenseki Volume 1

- Lady Red

Lady Red is a former office worker who quit her job to fight crime, however, she does not have any money or strength and is taken advantage of sexually. Published in Super Jump issue #2 on April 10, 1987, when it was still only a special issue of Weekly Shōnen Jump.

- Go! Go! Ackman
- Dub & Peter 1
- The Elder
- Young Master Ken'nosuke
- Mr. Ho
- Mad Matic
- Pola & Roid
- Wonder Island
- Dragon Boy

Mankanzenseki Volume 2

- Alien X Peke (宇宙人ペケ(エイリアンペケ), Eirian Peke)

Alien Peke plans to take over Earth, but suffers an accident. Three months later, he is still trying to find his spaceship and starts working as a bodyguard for a human family. Two chapters published in Weekly Shōnen Jump issues #37/38 and 39 of 1996.

- Soldier of Savings Cashman
- Karamaru and the Perfect Day
- Little Mamejiro
- The Adventure of Tongpoo
- Chobit
- Escape
- Pink
- Tomato the Cutesy Gumshoe
- Today's Highlight Island

Katsura & Akira Short Stories

- Sachie-chan Good!! (さちえちゃんグー!!, Sachie-chan Gū!!)

Sachie, a junior high student and descendant of a ninja clan, and martial artist Zarido (ザリド) are recruited by aliens to defeat galactic criminals terrorizing their planet. Published in the May 2008 issue of Jump SQ on April 4. Published in English in Viz Media's free SJ Alpha Yearbook 2013, which was sent to annual subscribers of Weekly Shonen Jump Alpha in December 2012.

- Jiya (JIYA -ジヤ-)

Galactic Patrolman Jiya challenges a vampire and his giant flea army that are terrorizing Earth. Three chapters published in Weekly Young Jump between December 10, 2009, and January 7, 2010, for the magazine's 30th anniversary.

== Bibliography ==
- Toriyama, Akira Akira Toriyama's Manga Theater (2021) Viz Media, ISBN 9781974723485
