= List of Dragon Ball Super episodes =

Promotional artwork

Dragon Ball Super is a Japanese anime television series produced by Toei Animation that aired from July 5, 2015, to March 25, 2018, on Fuji Television and its FNS affiliates. It is the first television series in the Dragon Ball franchise to feature a new story in 18 years. The series begins with a re-telling of the events of the final two Dragon Ball Z films, Battle of Gods (2013) and Resurrection 'F' (2015), which themselves take place during the ten-year timeskip after the events of the Majin Buu Saga as featured in Dragon Ball Z. Dragon Ball Super was followed up by the films Broly (2018) and Super Hero (2022), which both take place after the original series run.

Thirteen pieces of theme music are used: two opening themes and eleven ending themes. The first opening theme song for episodes 1 to 76 is "Chōzetsu Dynamic!" (超絶☆ダイナミック！, Chōzetsu Dainamikku; "Excellent Dynamic!") performed by Kazuya Yoshii of The Yellow Monkey in both Japanese and English. The lyrics were penned by Yukinojo Mori who has written numerous songs for the Dragon Ball series. The second opening theme song for episodes 77 to 131 is "Limit-Break x Survivor" (限界突破×サバイバー, Genkai Toppa x Sabaibā) by Kiyoshi Hikawa in Japanese and Nathan "NateWantsToBattle" Sharp in English. Mori wrote the lyrics for the rock number "Genkai Toppa x Survivor". Takafumi Iwasaki composed the music.

The first ending theme song for episodes 1 to 12 is "Hello Hello Hello" (ハローハローハロー, Harō Harō Harō) by Japanese rock band Good Morning America in Japanese and Jonathan Young in English. The second ending theme song for episodes 13 to 25 is "Starring Star" (スターリングスター, Sutāringu Sutā) by the group Keytalk in Japanese and ProfessorShyguy in English. The third ending song for episodes 26 to 36 is "Usubeni" (薄紅; "Light Pink") by the band Lacco Tower in Japanese and Jeff Smith in English. The fourth ending theme song for episodes 37 to 49 is "Forever Dreaming" by Czecho No Republic in Japanese and Mystery Skulls in English. The fifth ending theme song for episodes 50 to 59 is "Yoka Yoka Dance" (よかよかダンス, Yoka Yoka Dansu; "It's Fine Dance") by idol group Batten Girls in Japanese and Dani Artaud in English. The sixth ending theme song for episodes 60 to 72 is "Chaohan Music" (炒飯MUSIC, Chāhan Myūjikku) by Arukara in Japanese and Elliot Coleman in English. The seventh ending theme song for episodes 73 to 83 is "Aku no Tenshi to Seigi no Akuma" (悪の天使と正義の悪魔; "Evil Angel and Righteous Devil") by The Collectors in Japanese and William Kubley in English. The eighth ending theme song for episodes 84 to 96 is "Boogie Back" by Miyu Inoue in Japanese and Lizzy Land in English. The ninth ending theme song for episodes 97 to 108 is "Haruka" (遥) by Lacco Tower in Japanese and Zachary J. Willis in English. The tenth ending theme song for episodes 109 to 121 is "70cm Shihō no Madobe" (70cm四方の窓辺; "By a 70cm Square Window") by Rottengraffty in Japanese and Lawrence B. Park in English. The eleventh ending theme song for episodes 122 to 131 is "Lagrima" by OnePixcel in Japanese and Amanda "AmaLee" Lee in English.

== Series overview ==
In Japan and the United States, Dragon Ball Super was aired year-round continuously, without seasonal breaks; The "sagas" in this list divide the series by story arc according to Toei Animation's promotional material, and do not reflect the pattern in which the series was broadcast or produced.

Saga	Episodes	Originally released	
Saga	Episodes	First released	Last released
God of Destruction Beerus (Note: Sometimes referred to as the Battle of Gods Saga.)	18	July 5, 2015	November 8, 2015
Golden Frieza (Note: Sometimes referred to as the Resurrection 'F' Saga.)	9	November 15, 2015	January 17, 2016
Universe 6 (Note: Sometimes referred to as the God of Destruction Champa Saga.)	19	January 24, 2016	June 5, 2016
Goku Black / Zamasu	30	June 12, 2016	January 29, 2017
Universe Survival	55	February 5, 2017	March 25, 2018

== Episodes ==
=== God of Destruction Beerus Saga (2015) ===
No. overall	Saga No.	Title	Directed by	Written by	Original air date	English air date
1	1	"The Peace Reward – Who Will Get the 100 Million Zeni?" / "A Peacetime Reward: Who Gets the 100,000,000 Zeni?!"; Transliteration: "Heiwa no hōshū – ichioku Zenī wa dare no te ni!?" (Japanese: 平和の報酬 1億ゼニーは誰の手に!?)	Kōji Ogawa	Yoshifumi Fukushima	July 5, 2015	January 7, 2017
Four years after peace returns to Earth after the defeat of Majin Buu, Goku is forced by Chi-Chi to work as a farmer. Goten and his friend Trunks search for a gift for his sister-in-law Videl, who is married to his older brother, Gohan. Unable to afford jewelry or makeup, the two decide to visit a hot springs in the woods to bottle up some mineral water instead. While there, they are attacked by a giant snake, which they manage to scare away. Sometime later, Mr. Satan visits Goku and gives the 100 million Zeni he received for his purported role in saving Earth from Buu. Goku gives the money to Chi-Chi, so she will let him train. Elsewhere in deep space, Beerus the Destroyer is awoken from dreaming of a worthy opponent, prompting he and his attendant, Whis, to set out to discover who this figure is.
2	2	"To the Promised Resort! Vegeta Goes on a Family Trip?!" / "To the Promised Resort! Vegeta Takes a Family Trip!"; Transliteration: "Yakusoku no rizōto e! Bejīta ga kazoku ryokō!?" (Japanese: 約束のリゾートへ! ベジータが家族旅行!?)	Masato Mikami	King Ryū	July 12, 2015	January 14, 2017
As Goku goes to King Kai's planet to train, Vegeta, Bulma, and Trunks take a family trip to a resort. Bulma and Trunks are enjoying the family time together, while Vegeta is bothered by the fact that Goku gets to train. Fed up with what he considers a waste of time, Vegeta flies away and heads back to Capsule Corporation to train. Somewhere in space, Beerus and Whis scour an alien planet in search of dinosaur meat. They are confronted by the planet's strongest dweller, whom Beerus overpowers before effortlessly destroying the planet. At that time, Beerus has another vision of his destined opponent – the Super Saiyan God.
3	3	"Where's the Rest of the Dream?! In Search of the Super Saiyan God!" / "Where Does the Dream Pick Up? Find the Super Saiyan God!"; Transliteration: "Yume no tsuzuki wa doko da!? Sūpā Saiya-jin Goddo o sagase!" (Japanese: 夢の続きはどこだ!? 超(スーパー)サイヤ人ゴッドを探せ!)	Masanori Satō	Toshio Yoshitaka	July 19, 2015	January 21, 2017
Fearing what might happen knowing that Beerus is awake, the Old Supreme Kai and Kaibito urge King Kai to ensure that Goku never finds out about the Destroyer, but Goku overhears the conversation and becomes curious. Back in his temple, Beerus and Whis continue their search for the Super Saiyan God. They soon learn of Goku and his feats, and decide to pay him and King Kai a visit. Meanwhile, back on Earth, Goku's friends and family members begin gathering on the cruise ship for Bulma's birthday party except for Vegeta who is still training to surpass Goku as the strongest Saiyan.
4	4	"Aim for the Dragon Balls! Pilaf Gang in Action!" / "Bid for the Dragon Balls! Pilaf and Crew's Impossible Mission!"; Transliteration: "Mezase Doragon Bōru! Pirafu ichimi no dai-sakusen!" (Japanese: 目指せドラゴンボール! ピラフ一味の大作戦!)	Ryōta Nakamura	Makoto Koyama	August 2, 2015	January 28, 2017
With all guests now gathered (except for Goku and Vegeta), Bulma's birthday party gets underway. Trunks shows Goten where his mother hid the bingo tournament grand prize – the Dragon Balls. Not far off from the ship, the Pilaf Gang are now poor and hungry. They are trying to get by until they find the Dragon Balls and make their wishes come true. When his Dragon Radar picks up a signal coming from Bulma's ship, Pilaf and his henchmen hastily board the ship with Trunks and Goten's help. Meanwhile, on his planet, King Kai explains Beerus to Goku as a counterpart to the Supreme Kais who helps maintain universal balance. Just as he finishes, Beerus and Whis arrive.
5	5	"The Ultimate Fight on King Kai's Planet! Goku vs. the God of Destruction Beerus" / "Showdown on King Kai's World! Goku vs. Beerus the Destroyer!"; Transliteration: "Kaiō-sei no kessen! Gokū VS Hakaishin Birusu" (Japanese: 界王星の決戦! 悟空VS破壊神ビルス)	Takao Iwai	Yoshifumi Fukushima	August 9, 2015	February 4, 2017
Beerus and Whis arrives on King Kai's planet and detects Goku's presence, and while the former is initially disappointed that Goku knows nothing about the "Super Saiyan God", he nonetheless agrees to test his strength in a sparring match. Goku attempts to fight him in all of the Super Saiyan transformations, but Beerus effortlessly defeats him in two blows. Beerus and Whis head for Earth shortly afterwards, while King Kai uses his telepathy to warn Vegeta ahead of their arrival and ensure Beerus does not get upset.
6	6	"Don't Anger the God of Destruction! Excitement at the Birthday Party" / "Don't Anger the Destroyer! A Heart-Pounding Birthday Party"; Transliteration: "Hakaishin o okoraseru na! Doki-doki tanjō pātī" (Japanese: 破壊神を怒らせるな! ドキドキ誕生パーティー)	Morio Hatano	King Ryū	August 16, 2015	February 11, 2017
Beerus and Whis arrive on Earth as Bulma's birthday party is underway. Paralyzed by Beerus' presence, Vegeta recognizes him as the being who once visited Planet Vegeta and forced his father, King Vegeta, to his knees. Bulma pops up and assumes Beerus and Whis to be Vegeta's friends and invites them to join the party, which the two gladly accept as they become enamored with Earth cuisine. Though Vegeta tries his best to ensure that Beerus remains calm as he and Whis mingle with the guest, the Destroyer becomes furious when Majin Buu refuses to share the remaining pudding and attacks him for his insolence.
7	7	"How Dare You Hurt My Bulma! Vegeta's Sudden, Angry Shift?!" / "How Dare You Do That To My Bulma! Vegeta's Metamorphosis of Fury?"; Transliteration: "Yokumo ore no Buruma o! Bejīta ikari no totsuzenhen'i!?" (Japanese: よくもオレのブルマを! ベジータ怒りの突然変異!?)	Masato Mikami	Toshio Yoshitaka	August 23, 2015	February 18, 2017
Beerus effortlessly knocks Majin Buu away, telling Vegeta to step aside when he attempts to calm him. Trunks and Goten fuse into Gotenks, only to be outmatched and then punished by Beerus after insulting his pudding obsession. Beerus then defeats Piccolo, Tien Shinhan, and Android 18 before he and an upset Buu clash again. While observing the battle, Dende realizes what Beerus actually is and immediately informs Piccolo. Before Piccolo is able to warn him, Gohan powers up and charges towards Beerus before the Destroyer uses Buu as a weapon to knock Gohan down before tossing Buu aside. Vegeta attempts to stop it, but is forced to the ground by Beerus who expresses his disappointment of him being as weak as his father was. Just as Beerus is about to finish Vegeta, Bulma walks up and slaps him for ruining her party. Beerus retaliates with a backhand, with Vegeta finally losing his temper at seeing Bulma hurt and causing him to power up to a Super Saiyan 2's previously unmatched level.
8	8	"Goku Arrives! A Last Chance from Beerus Sama?!" / "Goku Makes an Entrance! A Last Chance from Lord Beerus?"; Transliteration: "Gokū kenzan! Birusu-sama kara no rasuto chansu!?" (Japanese: 悟空見参! ビルス様からのラストチャンス!?)	Kōhei Hatano	Toshio Yoshitaka	August 30, 2015	February 25, 2017
Having powered up to Super Saiyan 2, Vegeta charges towards Beerus but is knocked out when the Destroyer is revealed to have been using only a fraction of his power. While the Pilaf Gang disembark Bulma's ship on a stolen life raft, Beerus decides to give the Earthlings another chance at saving their planet and picks out Oolong owing to his similar appearance to Buu for a game of rock–paper–scissors to decide the fate of the planet. After a couple of ties, Beerus eventually wins and proceeds to power up his attack. Just as Beerus is about to fire, Goku arrives and requests that Beerus give them a reprieve as he has thought of a way they can get a Super Saiyan God: summoning Shenron.
9	9	"Sorry for the Wait, Beerus Sama. The Super Saiyan God Is Finally Born!" / "Thanks For Waiting, Lord Beerus! A Super Saiyan God is Born At Last!"; Transliteration: "O matase, Birusu-sama. Tsuini Sūpā Saiya-jin Goddo tanjō!" (Japanese: お待たせ、ビルス様。 ついに超(スーパー)サイヤ人ゴッド誕生!)	Masanori Satō	Toshio Yoshitaka	September 6, 2015	March 4, 2017
Goku gathers the Dragon Balls together and summons Shenron, who is startled upon learning of Beerus' presence. Shenron quickly explains that the Super Saiyan God is a legendary transformation that results from a ritual where six kind hearted Saiyans infuse their power into another. The Saiyans attempt to transform Goku, but they fail as they are one Saiyan short. An impatient Beerus is about to destroy the planet when Videl offers to join the ritual while revealing to be pregnant with Gohan's unborn child. The Saiyans and Videl attempt the transformation again and manage to transform Goku into the Super Saiyan God.
10	10	"Unleash It, Goku! The Power of the Super Saiyan God!!" / "Show Us, Goku! The Power of a Super Saiyan God!"; Transliteration: "Misero Gokū! Sūpā Saiya-jin Goddo no pawā!!" (Japanese: 見せろ悟空! 超(スーパー)サイヤ人ゴッドの力(パワー)!!)	Nozomu Shishido	Makoto Koyama	September 13, 2015	March 11, 2017
Super Saiyan God Goku confronts Beerus, amazed by the immense power his body has gained with the transformation as he gradually becomes used to his new form. Seeing that Goku might turn out to be a worthy adversary after all, Beerus decides it is time for them to unleash their true power and have a real battle of Gods.
11	11	"Let's Keep Going, Beerus Sama! Our Battle of Gods!" / "Let's Keep Going, Lord Beerus! The Battle of Gods!"; Transliteration: "Tsudukeyō ze Birusu-sama! Kami to kami no tatakai o!" (Japanese: 続けようぜビルス様! 神と神の戦いを!)	Takao Iwai	King Ryū	September 20, 2015	March 18, 2017
Having somewhat gotten a grip on the Super Saiyan God form, Goku initially manages to keep up with Beerus before realizing the Destroyer is holding himself back as a means to motivate Goku to catch up with him. To that end, Beerus drags Goku to space, where he swiftly knocks him out. Goku comes crashing down back to Earth and ends up in an ocean. Amazed by such power, Goku gets excited and powers up, healing himself in the process. Willing to have another go, Goku flies out of the ocean and dashes towards Beerus.
12	12	"The Universe Crumbles?! Clash! God of Destruction vs. Super Saiyan God" / "The Universe Will Shatter? Clash! Destroyer vs. Super Saiyan God!"; Transliteration: "Uchū ga kudakeru!? Gekitotsu! Haikaishin VS Sūpā Saiya-jin Goddo!" (Japanese: 宇宙が砕ける!? 激突! 破壊神VS超(スーパー)サイヤ人ゴッド!)	Masato Mikami	King Ryū	September 27, 2015	March 25, 2017
Goku and Beerus continue to fight in space, their clashing blows revealed to be producing shockwaves then are causing the universe to be undone. Old Supreme Kai assumes that two more such blows could destroy everything. However, Goku manages to neutralize the third clash with Beerus by balancing Beerus' attack with his own to prevent any more shock waves being produced. Beerus then uses his atomic bomb attack on Goku, who counters with a Kamehameha.
13	13	"Goku, Go Beyond Super Saiyan God" / "Goku, Surpass Super Saiyan God!"; Transliteration: "Gokū yo, Sūpā Saiya-jin Goddo o koete ike!" (Japanese: 悟空よ、超(スーパー)サイヤ人ゴッドを越えて行け!)	Masanori Satō	King Ryū	October 4, 2015	April 8, 2017 (Note: This episode was originally scheduled to air on April 1, 2017, but an unannounced change in schedule on April Fools' Day supplanted a new Dragon Ball Super episode with the premiere of the third season of Rick and Morty, which aired repeatedly from 8 p.m. to midnight ET/PT.)
The Supreme Kais are surprised that the universe is still intact following the battle with Old Kai assuming it to be Beerus's doing and fears the worst has yet to come. On Earth, Vegeta, Whis, and the others are still observing the fight with Whis impressed by the power a Super Saiyan God has. In space, Goku struggles to keep up with Beerus' attack, which ultimately ends up in a massive explosion that threatens the universe before Beerus uses his full power to negate it with Mr. Satan taking the credit when called by his public relations group. Goku and Beerus continue their fight after the latter tells the mortal he is at his limit, Goku transforming back into a Super Saiyan after losing his divinity. With Goku not realizing he has lost his Super Saiyan God form until after, he manages to land a hit on Beerus who deduces his opponent can still fight on equal ground.
14	14	"This Is Every Ounce of Power I Have! The Battle of Gods' Conclusion!" / "This is All the Power I've Got! A Settlement Between Gods"; Transliteration: "Kore ga ora no arittake no chikarada! Ketchaku! Kami to kami" (Japanese: これがオラのありったけの力だ! 決着! 神と神)	Morio Hatano	King Ryū	October 11, 2015	April 15, 2017
Continuing to fight despite being limited to Super Saiyan form, Goku is knocked out by Beerus. With Goku knocked out, Beerus prepares to destroy the Earth. In a final effort to stop Beerus, Goku once again powers up and charges his Kamehameha attack. Goku manages to prevent Beerus' attack, but completely depletes his remaining energy in the process. He comes crashing down to Earth onto Bulma's ship, where Vegeta manages to catch him. Beerus lands on the planet shortly after to honor his promise of destroying Earth should he win, only to suddenly fall asleep. Whis explains that Goku must have tired Beerus out as he takes the Destroyer back to their home world, assuring the group that Beerus would have likely forgotten about their trip to Earth. But Beerus is actually pretending to sleep, having realized the Super Saiyan God ritual only unlocked a fraction of Goku's untapped potential while not wishing to admit his satisfaction of finding a worthy adversary while also wanting to sample more Earth food. With Earth safe, Goku decides to relax and enjoy the party.
15	15	"Make a Miracle, Satan the Hero! A Challenge from Outer Space!" / "Valiant Mr. Satan, Work a Miracle! A Challenge from Outer Space!" ("Valiant Hercule, Work a Miracle! A Challenge from Outer Space!"); Transliteration: "Yūsha Satan yo kiseki o okose! Uchū kara no chōsenjō!!" (Japanese: 勇者サタンよ奇跡を起こせ! 宇宙からの挑戦状!!)	Hideki Hiroshima	Yoshifumi Fukushima	October 18, 2015	April 22, 2017
With Earth no longer in danger, Goku and the others return to their ordinary lives. Goku ends up working as a farmer again after Chi-Chi reveals that she spent a majority of the 100 million Zeni they received from Mr. Satan and insisting that Goku needs to become a role model for his unborn grandchild. Meanwhile, Mr. Satan's self-promotion as the one who defeated Beerus goes awry when alien ambassadors from planet Snack came to give their gratitude before their champion Galbee challenges Mr. Satan. After being unable to call Gohan or the others for help, Mr. Satan tries to enlist Goku's help when he arrives at the scene. Goku is forced to escape when Chi-Chi spots him about to fight, which forces Mr. Satan to deal with Galbee himself to maintain his image. Luckily, the aliens having intended to conquer Earth, the Snackians are revealed to be cynophobic as they leave Earth in terror upon spotting Mr. Satan's dog Bee.
16	16	"Vegeta Becomes an Apprentice?! Winning Whis Over!" / "Vegeta Becomes a Student?! Win Over Whis!"; Transliteration: "Bejīta ga deshi'iri!? Uisu o kōryakuse yo!" (Japanese: ベジータが弟子入り!? ウイスを攻略せよ!)	Masato Mikami	Yoshifumi Fukushima	October 25, 2015	April 29, 2017
Chi-Chi still has Goku doing farm work where Krillin finds him sleeping on the job surprised that he did not leave to train with King Kai. After reminiscing about their childhood training under Master Roshi, Krillin asks Goku to punch him to learn the gap between their power levels. A reluctant Goku tries to change Krillin's mind before acquiescing, with Krillin being knocked over a distance before hitting a boulder. Shortly afterwards, Goku brings Krillin to his house with Android 18 treating his wounds. Krillin states that he misses martial arts and wishes to start training again. Meanwhile, after training in the wastelands, Vegeta returns to Capsule Corp and learns Bulma has been going out on luncheons with Whis to show him Earth cuisine as a means to prevent Beerus from destroying Earth. When Vegeta learns Whis is Beerus's fighting instructors, he requests becoming an apprentice by offering Whis the tastiest food on Earth. After several failed attempts, Vegeta finally impresses Whis with Bulma's personal brand of instant noodle cups. After Bulma presents him with a new battle suit, Vegeta heads off with Whis to train on Beerus' planet.
17	17	"Pan Is Born! And Goku Goes on a Training Trip?!" / "Pan is Born! And Goku Goes on a Training Journey?!"; Transliteration: "Pan tanjō! Soshite Gokū wa shugyō no tabi he!?" (Japanese: パン誕生! そして悟空は修行の旅へ!?)	Masanori Satō	Yoshifumi Fukushima	November 1, 2015	May 6, 2017
Pan has been born with Chi-Chi refusing to allow her granddaughter to be end up a martial arts fanatic like Goku. While everyone attempts to persuade Chi-Chi to change her mind, Bulma accidentally reveals Vegeta having left six months ago to train under Whis to Goku's shock. After some time with Goku repeatedly inquiring if Whis has returned, Bulma gives him a cellphone to stop his harassment. He immpediately approaches Whis during his outing with Bulma as soon as he receives her call, and Whis accepts Goku's plea to be mentored, thinking it to be perfect timing for Goku to join Vegeta in training. Just as the two are about to depart, Chi-Chi upon learning from Gohan of Goku's departure attempts to stop him. Goku nevertheless leaves with Whis, and though devastated at his departure, Chi-Chi is sure that Goku will return sometime.
18	18	"I'm Here, Too! Training Begins on Beerus' Planet!" / "I'm Here, Too! Training Commences on Beerus' World"; Transliteration: "Ora mo kita zo! Birusu-sei de shugyō kaishi da!" (Japanese: オラも来たぞ! ビルス星で修行開始だ!)	Takao Iwai	Yoshifumi Fukushima	November 8, 2015	May 13, 2017
Goku and Whis arrive on Beerus' planet, where Vegeta is tasked with housekeeping. Goku is surprised to learn that Vegeta has gotten considerably stronger training under Whis. Goku wants to start his training right away, but learns that he and Vegeta must first carry out some house chores that include changing Beerus' bed sheets without waking him up. When the actually training occurs, it quickly wears Goku out as he falls asleep while Vegeta continues. The next day, Whis decides to have a sparring match with his apprentices in order to gauge their speed. The two prove to be no match for Whis., and both are too slow to land a single hit on Whis. Somewhere in space, surviving members of Frieza's army are led by Sorbet. They continue their efforts of resurrecting their leader. Not far off, mysterious beings similar to Beerus and Whis have destroyed a planet in search of something.

=== Golden Frieza Saga (2015–2016) ===
No. overall	Saga No.	Title	Directed by	Written by	Original air date	English air date
19	1	"Despair Rises! The Emperor of Evil, Frieza, Resurrected!" / "Despair Redux! The Return of the Evil Emperor, Frieza!"; Transliteration: "Zetsubō futatabi! Aku no teiō Furīza no fukkatsu!" (Japanese: 絶望ふたたび! 悪の帝王・フリーザの復活!)	Kōhei Hatano	Makoto Koyama	November 15, 2015	May 20, 2017
Goku and Vegeta continue their training under Whis on Beerus' planet. Meanwhile, Sorbet is unable to find New Namek and thus he and his assistant Tagoma (タゴマ) depart for Earth to use its Dragon Balls instead to resurrect their leader Frieza. They run into the Pilaf Gang, who had collected all seven Dragon Balls just before their arrival. Sorbet coerces Pilaf into summoning Shenron, who explains that reviving Frieza would be futile as his body was cut in pieces when Future Trunks killed him. Sorbet insists after Tagoma suggests using their advanced healing technology to restore Frieza; the two collect Frieza's pieces and return to their ship as Mai and Shu have used up the remaining wishes. Frieza is completely regenerated shortly afterwards.
20	2	"Jaco's Warning! Frieza and His 1000 Troops Approach" / "A Warning from Jaco! Frieza and 1,000 Soldiers Close In"; Transliteration: "Jako kara no keikoku! Semari kuru Furīza to 1000-ri no heishi-tachi!" (Japanese: ジャコからの警告! 迫り来るフリーザと1000人の兵士達)	Hideki Hiroshima	Toshio Yoshitaka	November 22, 2015	June 3, 2017
Once restored, revealing his horrific ordeal in Hell, Frieza desires revenge against Goku and Future Trunks. Tagoma objects to Frieza's plans, but Frieza promptly subdues him. When Frieza finds out that Goku has gotten much stronger since they last met, he decides to train in order to become more powerful. Since Frieza's power was inborn, he reveals that he had never felt the need to train a day in his life before now. Four months pass before Frieza and his army head for Earth. All the while, Goku and Vegeta continue their training under Whis. Jaco the Galactic Patrolman travels to Earth to inform Bulma that Frieza has been revived and is approaching Earth with an army of one thousand soldiers. With the Frieza Force fast approaching, Bulma gathers the remaining fighters to fight Frieza's army in hopes of holding out until Goku and Vegeta make it back to Earth.
21	3	"The Start of Revenge! The Malice of Frieza Army Strikes Gohan!" / "The Start of Vengeance! The Frieza Force's Malice Strikes Gohan!"; Transliteration: "Fukushū no hajimari! Furīza-gun no akuiga satoshi Gohan outsu!" (Japanese: 復讐の始まり! フリーザ軍の悪意が悟飯を撃つ!)	Masanori Satō	King Ryū	November 29, 2015	June 10, 2017
Frieza and his army arrive on Earth, where Gohan, Piccolo, Krillin, Master Roshi, Tien, and Jaco have assembled to hold out until Goku and Vegeta return. Frieza says that he has waited a long time to have his revenge and that he wishes to face Goku. Seeing that he is not present to help, Frieza orders his army to attack the Earthlings, and they proves to be no match for the fighters – even Krillin, who had given up fighting. Disappointed with his lackluster army, Frieza orders Sorbet to send in his elite soldier Shisami (シサミ) to take out Gohan. Suddenly, Tagoma fires a beam at Shisami and Gohan, which kills the former and badly injures the latter. Sorbet is surprised by Tagoma's newfound power, which he had achieved through training with Frieza. Frieza promises Tagoma the command of his army if he takes out the Earthlings. He accepts and prepares to fight the Earthlings. Meanwhile, Goku and Vegeta are oblivious to what is happening on Earth as Whis sends them to train in a pocket dimension at Beerus's command.
22	4	"Change! An Unexpected Return! His Name is Ginyu!!"; Transliteration: "Chēnji! Masaka no fukkatsu! Sono na wa Ginyū!!" (Japanese: チェーンジ! まさかの復活! その名はギニュー!!)	Takao Iwai	Yoshifumi Fukushima	December 6, 2015	June 17, 2017
Tagoma powers up and confidently approaches his opponents. Piccolo is instantly outmatched. Gohan blasts Tagoma, which causes him to fly several yards away. As the dust settles, Tagoma reveals himself to be unharmed as he gloats that the punished he endured from sparring with Frieza made him invulnerable. Gotenks suddenly arrives and headbutts Tagoma below the belt before splitting back into Goten and Trunks, with Frieza assuming the latter to be Future Trunk's son. At that moment, Captain Ginyu exploits Tagoma's moment of weakness to trick him into setting off his signature body swap ability. After venting his own ordeal, Ginyu is able to quickly adjust to his new body's immense power and overpowers everyone simultaneously. Bulma, Trunks, and Goten attempt to contact Whis, which bewilders Jaco. While fighting Gohan, Ginyu appears to have the upper hand until Gohan transforms into a Super Saiyan and defeats him. When Gohan shows mercy to Ginyu, Frieza becomes enraged and explains that Gohan showing mercy on Ginyu reminds him of how he himself was spared by Goku and fires multiple Death Beams at Gohan. Before Frieza can kill Gohan, Piccolo steps in to save him.
23	5	"The Earth! Gohan! Absolute Peril! Hurry and Get Here, Son Goku!!" / "Earth! Gohan! Both on the Ropes! Hurry and Get Here, Goku!!"; Transliteration: "Chikyū ga! Gohan ga! Zettaizetsumei! Hayaku kite kure Son Gokū!!" (Japanese: 地球が! 悟飯が! 絶体絶命! 早く来てくれ孫悟空!!)	Yukihiko Nakao	Makoto Koyama	December 13, 2015	June 24, 2017
Piccolo takes Frieza's attack to save Gohan and dies in the process. On Beerus' planet, Beerus has developed an obsession for pizza and becomes furious when he learns that Goku and Vegeta ate the reserve pizzas Whis stored in his pocket dimension. Whis telepathically responds to Bulma's invitation for a strawberry sundae and relays her message of Frieza's revival and Piccolo's death to Goku and Vegeta. As Whis says it would take some time to reach Earth, Goku resorts to instant transmission on Beerus' advice, but realizes that instant transmission is impossible due to the large distance between Earth and Beerus' planet and the need to find a potent enough energy signature to pinpoint. On Earth, Gohan powers up to his maximum limit to give his father an energy source for instant transmission. Goku and Vegeta arrive on Earth in the nick of time to save Gohan, upon which Vegeta promptly executes Ginyu. As Goku and Frieza meet after a long time, Frieza transforms directly into his final form to demonstrate his new power. This results in the death of all his men except for Sorbet, who is at a considerable distance. Perplexed by Frieza's new power, Goku prepares to engage in a battle.
24	6	"Clash! Frieza vs. Son Goku; This Is The Result of My Training!" / "Clash! Frieza vs. Goku! This is the Result of My Training!"; Transliteration: "Gekitotsu! Furīza VS Son Gokū; Kore ga ora no shugyō no seikada!" (Japanese: 激突! フリーザVS孫悟空 これがオラの修行の成果だ!)	Hideki Hiroshima	Toshio Yoshitaka	December 20, 2015	July 8, 2017
The battle between Goku and Frieza begins. They fight on even ground, with neither one able to inflict significant damage to the other. Frieza resorts to attacking Krillin and Bulma. Goku tries to save them and is caught off guard when Frieza lands several blows on him. Eventually lashing out at Goku, Vegeta intervenes out of impatience for the fighters' constant rambling and holding back their full power. Goku takes Vegeta's request into account and convinces Frieza to power up to his maximum. When Frieza calls out to Goku to show his full power, Goku transforms on his own into a new version of a Super Saiyan God, the Super Saiyan Blue.
25	7	"An All-Out Battle! The Revenge of Golden Frieza!" / "A Full-Throttle Battle! The Vengeful Golden Frieza"; Transliteration: "Zenkai Batoru! Fukushū no Gōruden Furīza" (Japanese: 全開バトル! 復讐のゴールデンフリーザ)	Masanori Satō	Toshio Yoshitaka	December 27, 2015	July 15, 2017
After testing Goku's new transformation, which Goku explains is a Super Saiyan equivalent to a Super Saiyan God, Frieza unveils his new Golden Frieza form. After expressing how impressed they are by each other's progress, Goku and Frieza engage in a fierce battle. Meanwhile, Whis informs Bulma of their arrival on Earth in a few minutes but he and Beerus stop midway aupon encountering Universe Six's Destroyer Champa (シャンパ, Shanpa) and his attendant Vados (ヴァドス, Vadosu). After having a short conversation with Champa and Vados, Beerus and Whis finally arrive on the battlefield. While eating Bulma's delicious dessert, Beerus and Whis acknowledge that Frieza has indeed become significantly stronger and that Goku seems to have a tough time keeping up with Golden Frieza. Still not used to his newest form, Goku struggles to keep up with Golden Frieza's speed and prowess, eventually getting pummeled into the ground.
26	8	"A Glint of Hope Shines Through in a Crisis! Time to Fight Back, Son Goku!" / "A Chance Appears in a Tight Spot! Launch a Counteroffensive, Goku!"; Transliteration: "Dai pinchi ni shōki ga mieta! Hangeki kaishida Son Gokū!" (Japanese: 大ピンチに勝機が見えた! 反撃開始だ孫悟空!)	Kōhei Hatano	Makoto Koyama	January 10, 2016	July 22, 2017
Frieza and Goku continue their protracted battle with Frieza landing more blows on Goku than can be returned. Unable to match Frieza's raw power, Goku manages to withstand and dodge Frieza's attacks. Goku and Vegeta notice that Frieza is progressively losing stamina and that his power level is dropping. Frieza himself fails to notice this. Vegeta urges Goku to quickly finish Frieza off before he has a chance to recover, or he will step up and do so himself. After Goku and Frieza exchange some sarcastic banter, they power up again and continue their fight. Frieza still has the upper hand, but Goku realizes he only needs to stall Frieza long enough for his weakness to reappear. After a fully powered Frieza unleashes a barrage of attacks, he quickly becomes tired and starts running out of breath Frieza's attacks no longer hurt Goku. Frieza finally realizes his weakness, which is a lack of endurance. His Golden form exhausts more energy than he can produce. Goku explains this is because Frieza rushed to Earth immediately after achieving the Golden form without giving himself enough time to master it. Frieza agonizes over his failed chance at revenge in combat, but mouths a few inaudible words to Sorbet for assistance. Goku tells Frieza to leave Earth, while he still can do so. Everyone is surprised to see a laser beam pierce Goku's chest from behind, which was fired from Sorbet's ray gun. Stomping on Goku's chest wound to make him scream, Frieza gloats about his backup strategy to have Goku let his guard down. Frieza mocks him by claiming Goku's overconfidence prevents him from being the strongest fighter. Before Frieza can unleash his killing shot on Goku, Vegeta fires at Frieza and announces that it is his turn to fight.
27	9	"The Earth Explodes?! The Deciding Kamehameha" / "The Earth Explodes? A Decisive Kamehameha!"; Transliteration: "Chikyū bakuhatsu!? Ketchaku no kamehameha" (Japanese: 地球爆発!? 決着のかめはめ波)	Takao Iwai	Yoshifumi Fukushima	January 17, 2016	July 29, 2017
Goku is critically injured, but Vegeta intervenes before Frieza can deliver a killing blow. When Krillin attempts to deliver Goku a Senzu Bean, Frieza attempts to blast him. Vegeta redirects the blast to Sorbet, which kills him. Afterwards, Vegeta demonstrates his own ability to transform into a Super Saiyan Blue. Frieza attempts to land a hit on Vegeta, but he fails to do so. Frieza is already exhausted from his fight with Goku. Frieza quickly finds himself completely outmatched by Vegeta. Enraged and humiliated, Frieza refuses to accept defeat. While Vegeta powers up a killing shot, Frieza instead fires an attack at the Earth and destroys it out from under them. Whis protects Goku and the others, but Vegeta and everyone else on the planet are killed. Whis suspects Frieza survived and escaped through his ability to breathe in space. As Goku laments his missed opportunity to finish off Frieza and protect the Earth, Whis offers to turn back time by a couple of minutes and allow Goku one last chance. The moment is reset to the end of Vegeta and Frieza's battle. This allows Goku just enough time to charge up a Decisive Kamehameha attack and kill Frieza in order to save the Earth. Later, the group gathers at Capsule Corporation, where Piccolo is revived with the Namekian Dragon Balls. Shaken by his helplessness against Frieza, Gohan tells Piccolo that he intends to resume his training so that he can protect his loved ones, which Piccolo is delighted to hear.

=== Universe 6 Saga (2016) ===
No. overall	Saga No.	Title	Directed by	Written by	Original air date	English air date
28	1	"The God of Destruction from Universe 6 – His Name Is Champa!" / "The 6th Universe's Destroyer! His Name is Champa!"; Transliteration: "Dai-6 uchū no hakaishin – Sono na wa Shanpa" (Japanese: 第6宇宙の破壊神 その名はシャンパ)	Yukihiko Nakao	King Ryū	January 24, 2016	August 5, 2017
Goku and Vegeta continue their rigorous training before being chased by an enraged Beerus, whose awakening was caused by Champa and Vados abruptly arrive on Beerus' planet. After a small skirmish between Beerus and Champa, everyone settles down to eat some food with Champa formally introduced as Beerus' twin brother and Vados as Whis' older sister. An argument erupts concerning which universe's food is superior, with Whis explaining to Goku and Vegeta there are eleven universes besides their reality: The Seventh Universe. Whis adds that both the Seventh and Sixth Universes complement each other as their designated numbers add to thirteen. After Vados discovers that Universe Six's Earth has been destroyed through warfare, Champa proposes a tournament with Beerus with the winner allowed to swap Earths. Beerus protests until Champa reveals the feat is possible with the Super Dragon Balls, which the Namekian Dragon Balls were trimmed from, possessing six of them. Goku informs Beerus and Champa that Bulma is capable of locating the final Super Dragon Ball necessary to perform the wish. With tensions mounting, Beerus accepts Champa's proposal.
29	2	"The Martial Arts Match Has Been Decided! The Team Captain Is Stronger Than Goku" / "Combat Matches Are a Go! The Captain Is Someone Stronger Than Goku"; Transliteration: "Kakutō shiai kaisai kettei! Shushō wa Gokū yori tsuyoi yatsu" (Japanese: 格闘試合開催決定! 主将は悟空よりも強いヤツ)	Hideki Hiroshima	King Ryū	January 31, 2016	August 12, 2017
Champa decides to host the tournament on a vacated nameless planet located between the Sixth and Seventh Universes, Goku proposing using rules similar to Earth's Tenkaichi Budokai with Vegeta recommends a written exam be implemented in order to prevent anyone unable to follow the rules from participating. The tournament is scheduled to begin five days as Champa has Vados proceeds to set up the arena with a breathable atmosphere. After judging Whis' students, Champa decides to enlist a Saiyan of his universe. On Earth, Whis requests that Bulma use her Dragon Radar in order to obtain the final Super Dragon Ball. While Bulma believes it would be easier to simply summon Shenron to locate it instead, the dragon reveals the task to be beyond his power. Beerus and Whis then take their leave to have Goku and Vegeta recruit two members for their team, the form revealing his intent to recruit a powerful fighter named Monaka (モナカ). After Bulma finishes constructing the Super Dragon Radar the following morning, she takes Beerus's banter seriously and intends to collect the Super Dragon Balls before the Destroyer could use them to wish for total annihilation of the entire world.
30	3	"A Review Before the 'Martial Arts Match' – Who Are the Last Two Members?!" / "A Run-Through For the Competition! Who Are the Last Two Members?"; Transliteration: ""Kakutō" shiai e no o sarai – Nokori futari no menbā wa dareda!?" (Japanese: 「格闘試合」へのおさらい 残り二人のメンバーは誰だ!?)	Takahiro Imamura	Yoshifumi Fukushima	February 7, 2016	August 19, 2017
Goku and Vegeta meet up with Krillin, who goes with them to recruit Majin Buu as the fourth combatant of the Universe Seven team. Although Majin Buu is reluctant due to his hatred of Beerus, he agrees when Goku promises him a wish from the Super Dragon Balls, which he plans on giving to Mr. Satan. Goten and Trunks try to join, but they are denied by Vegeta because their use of fusion is illegal. The group finds Piccolo training with Gohan, recruiting him as their final member. Gohan considers joining the team, but he cannot participate due to a business meeting on the day of the tournament. Beerus and the others think back over recent events. Beerus and Whis contemplate the intentions behind Champa's plans as well as their own interests in Goku, recapping from their first encounter with the Saiyan to Frieza's demise.
31	4	"Off to Zuno Sama's! Find Out Where Super Dragon Balls Are!" / "Off to See Master Zuno! Find Out Where the Super Dragon Balls Are!"; Transliteration: "Zunō-sama no moto e! Sūpā Doragon Bōru no arika o kikidase!" (Japanese: ズノー様のもとへ! 超(スーパー)ドラゴンボールのありかを聞き出せ!)	Ryōta Nakamura	King Ryū	February 14, 2016	August 26, 2017
Initially refusing to help Bulma after forcing him to come to Earth, Jaco suggests inquiring about the Super Dragon Ball from an omniscient alien named Master Zunō (ズノー様, Zunō-sama). After arriving on Master Zunō's planet, Jaco failing to mention the seven-year waiting period, the duo encounter a spacefaring criminal named Burpman (ゲップマン, Geppuman), who is wanted by the Galactic Patrol for multiple dine and dash crimes. Having accidentally destroyed a monument and pinning the blame on Burpman, Jaco eventually decides to arrest the criminal so he and Bulma can take his spot and seek Master Zunō's advice right away. While Bulma unwittingly wasted two of her three questions, she learns the radius and other properties of the Super Dragon Balls as well as that they were formerly scattered across both the Sixth and Seventh Universes.
32	5	"The Match Begins! Let's All Go to the 'Nameless Planet'!" / "The Matches Begin! We're All Off to the Planet with No Name!"; Transliteration: "Shiaikaishi da! Min'na de "Namae no nai hoshi" e!" (Japanese: 試合開始だ! みんなで「名前のない星」へ!)	Masanori Satō	King Ryū	February 21, 2016	September 9, 2017
On Earth, everyone gathers for the trip to the tournament. Goku and Vegeta arrive after having trained in the Hyperbolic Time Chamber for three years. After stopping at Beerus' planet to get both him and Monaka, everyone proceeds to go to the tournament. The group meets their competition who are all somewhat unusual. This includes a Saiyan with a radically different history and a fighter resembling Frieza. After the written test, the Universe Seven team is left one team member down because Majin Buu falls asleep and is disqualified. Beerus decides that Monaka will go last. After a round of rock-paper-scissors, it is decided that Goku will fight first, followed by Piccolo, and then Vegeta. Goku and his competitor, a large bear-like creature named Botamo (ボタモ), enter the tournament ring.
33	6	"Behold, Universe 6! This Is the Super Saiyan? Son Goku!" / "Surprise, 6th Universe! This is Super Saiyan Goku!"; Transliteration: "Odoroke Dai-6 uchū yo! Kore ga Sūpā Saiya-jin ・ Son Gokū da!" (Japanese: 驚け第6宇宙よ! これが超(スーパー)サイヤ人・孫悟空だ!)	Hideki Hiroshima	King Ryū	February 28, 2016	September 16, 2017
The fight between Goku and Botamo commences. Goku takes a while to warm up due to having overeaten during the trip. Although Goku seems faster and more well trained than Botamo, none of the hits that he lands seem to have an effect. Botamo seems content to simply take the punishment. Urged by Vegeta to think before he acts, Goku drags Botamo to the side of the ring and throws him out. This results in a win for Universe Seven. The next match begins almost immediately with Goku facing the Frieza-like combatant Frost (フロスト, Furosuto). In direct contrast to Frieza, Frost is a kind and beloved hero in the Sixth Universe who looks forward to a challenge. Goku surprises Frost with knowledge of his transformations while asking him to assume his final form, Frost attempting to hold back by assuming his third form. But Goku sees through the deception and assumes Super Saiyan form to have Frost accept his request. Frost seems greatly outmatched by Goku even in his final transformation until a strange effect comes over the Saiyan, allowing Frost the chance to knock Goku out of the ring to his friends' shock.
34	7	"Piccolo vs. Frost – Put It All on the Special Beam Cannon!" / "Piccolo vs Frost! Stake it All on the Special Beam Cannon!"; Transliteration: "Pikkoro VS Furosuto – Makankōsappō ni subete o kakero!" (Japanese: ピッコロVSフロスト 魔貫光殺砲にすべてをかけろ!)	Takao Iwai	King Ryū	March 6, 2016	September 23, 2017
With Goku removed from the tournament, Piccolo faces Frost next and charges up his Special Beam Cannon while simultaneously evading Frost's attacks. To buy himself time to charge his attack, Piccolo creates clones of himself to distract Frost. Frost quickly disposes of decoys and charges at Piccolo. After a bout of close combat, Frost defeats Piccolo with a power blast. Before the referee could rule in Frost's favor, Jaco chimes in claiming that Frost had been cheating all along. The referee examines Frost and finds that he had been using an illegal item hidden in his gauntlet to drug his opponents into a temporary stupor. Champa is initially outraged to find that Frost had cheated. Vados reveals that Frost actually runs a criminal empire with the latter confessing that he set up the attacks on the planets he saved. Although Piccolo is declared the winner and Frost is disqualified, Vegeta reverses it to fight Frost.
35	8	"Turn Rage into Strength! Vegeta's Full-On Battle!" / "Turn Your Anger into Strength! Vegeta's Full-Bore Battle"; Transliteration: "Ikari o chikara ni kaero! Bejīta no zenkai batoru" (Japanese: 怒りを力に変えろ! ベジータの全開バトル)	Kazuya Karasawa	King Ryū	March 20, 2016	September 30, 2017
After Frost arrogantly announces his intent to utterly defeat Vegeta with poison, both parties agree that the match should not be regulated by the standard rules so both combatants can fight to kill. This ends up with Frost mercilessly defeated and knocked out of the ring by Vegeta, who refuses to lower himself by killing Frost. Beerus then proceeds to have Goku reinstated into the competition after finding where Frost's weapon got him, insisting the Saiyan goes after Monaka with a hushed remark from Whis concerning Monaka's "true colors". Vados generates a new barrier around the ring as the referee announces a new rule, where any contact an individual makes with the barrier automatically disqualifies them. Meanwhile, Frost attempts to steal the treasure Champa promised the team and escape in Champa's transportation cube, but is knocked out by the assassin Hit (ヒット, Hitto) and brought back to the arena. The next match begins. Vegeta faces off against the robot-like alien Magetta (マゲッタ), with the audience disputing over Magetta's eligibility over spitting lava. Magetta is declared eligible because the lava is just his saliva. Magetta's volcanic fumes engulf the barrier and cause Vegeta to perspire rapidly and breathe heavily from the extreme heat.
36	9	"An Unexpected Desperate Battle! Vegeta's Furious Explosion!" / "An Unexpectedly Uphill Battle! Vegeta's Great Blast of Fury!"; Transliteration: "Masaka no dai kusen! Bejīta ikari no dai bakuhatsu!" (Japanese: まさかの大苦戦! ベジータ怒りの大爆発!)	Ken'ichi Takeshita	Makoto Koyama	March 27, 2016	October 7, 2017
Vegeta struggles in his battle with Magetta due to both the rising temperatures and the lack of oxygen above the ring. Vegeta tries to win quickly, but Magetta endures and counters his attacks. Magetta follows it with a punch that sends Vegeta flying toward the ground. After nearly being disqualified through by going out of bounds, Vegeta powers up in anger and destroys the arena's barrier. He blasts Magetta and forces him to the very edge of the stage, managing to only succeed as Magetta's species is revealed to be very sensitive to hurtful insults.
37	10	"Don't Forget Your Saiyan Pride! Vegeta vs. the Saiyan of Universe 6!" / "Don't Forget Your Saiyan Pride! Vegeta vs. The 6th Universe's Saiyan!"; Transliteration: "Saiya-jin no hokori o wasureruna! Bejīta VS Dai-6 uchū no Saiya-jin" (Japanese: サイヤ人の誇りを忘れるな! ベジータVS第6宇宙のサイヤ人)	Takao Iwai	Toshio Yoshitaka	April 3, 2016	October 14, 2017
Vegeta faces a young Sixth Universe Saiyan Cabba (キャベ), his people being benevolent galactic protectors. Vegeta and Cabba are initially equally matched, the latter revealing his inability to become a Super Saiyan and requesting Vegeta to teach him. This seemingly enrages Vegeta as he assumes his Super Saiyan to mercilessly beat Cabba to an inch of his life while threatening to kill everyone he holds dear if he loses. This provokes Cabba to awaken his Super Saiyan form as he goes on the offensive, only to learn that Vegeta was purposely provoking him into channeling his anger. Vegeta quickly powers up into Super Saiyan Blue to display what Cabba could achieve before knocking him out. Though Cabba thanks Vegeta for telling him about his untapped potential, he brushes him off and tells the youth to not forget his Saiyan pride and surpass all others. Cabba acknowledges Vegeta's advice and walks off the stage. With Universe Six now down to their last fighter, Champa is still unconcerned as he is certain Hit will settle the score in their favor despite learning what the assassin requested as his reward.
38	11	"The Ultimate Warrior of Universe 6! Assassin Hit Appears!!" / "The 6th Universe's Mightiest Warrior! Engage the Assassin Hit!"; Transliteration: "Dai-6 uchū saikyō no senshi! Koroshi ya Hitto kenzan!!" (Japanese: 第6宇宙最強の戦士! 殺し屋ヒット見参!!)	Kōhei Hatano	Toshio Yoshitaka	April 10, 2016	October 21, 2017
Vegeta and Hit start their battle, the former finding himself unable to land a single blow on Hit due to his superior speed. Eventually, Vegeta is struck by a heavy blow and collapses with Hit declared the winner. Suddenly, it is revealed that Hit used a technique called "time-skip", which freezes a tenth of a second for everyone but himself. Goku walks up to battle Hit. Initially, Hit overpowers Goku, which prompts him to ask Goku to surrender. Goku refuses and reveals he's been using the time to figure out how Hit's technique works, predicting and evading his opponent's moves. Hit claims that Goku's foresight was just a fluke and that he will not be able to use it again. But Goku is able to foresee Hit's attacks and defend himself. Goku proposes that both of them fight at their full power. Hit concurs and withdraws. Shortly afterwards, both start preparing for their next fight.
39	12	"The Advanced "Time-Skip" Fights Back?! Will It Come Forth? Goku's New Technique!" / "A Developed "Time Skip" Counterstrike? Here Comes Goku's New Move!"; Transliteration: "Seichōshita "toki tobashi" no hangeki!? Deru ka!? Gokū no aratana waza!" (Japanese: 成長した"時とばし"の反撃!? 出るか!?悟空の新たな技!)	Ryōta Nakamura	King Ryū	April 17, 2016	November 4, 2017
While Goku manages to counter Hit's time-skip attacks, the displeased Hit fakes a power up while revealing that Goku inspired him to increase the duration of his time-skip to a second to inflict enough blows to force Goku on ground. Champa tells Hit to finish off Goku, but Hit refuses to obey his order out of respect for Goku. Goku manages to get back on his feet, and the two resume their fight. Goku is soon backed into a corner and resorts to using a move he intended to use on Beerus: using the Kaiō-ken technique while in Super Saiyan Blue form to greatly increase his strength and speed. Having powered up, Goku begins pummeling and blasting Hit, who manages to evade most of the attacks with ease.
40	13	"At Last, It Comes to an End! Is the Winner Beerus? Or is it Champa?" / "A Decision at Last! Is the Winner Beerus? Or is it Champa?"; Transliteration: "Tsuini ketchaku! Shōsha wa Birusu? Soretomo Shanpa?" (Japanese: ついに決着! 勝者はビルス? それともシャンパ?)	Masanori Satō	King Ryū	April 24, 2016	November 11, 2017
Goku and Hit reach a stalemate as they resolve not to fight for the Destroyers' whims, Goku requesting that for the rules to be waived so Hit can freely use his assassination techniques. Champa and Beerus argue over this decision before Goku jumps out of the ring in response to Beerus's refusal to remove the rules, revealing that he was at his limit of using Kaiō-ken. Shortly afterwards, a frightened Monaka faces Hit, who takes a dive to repay Goku for enabling him to surpass his limits the Universe Seven team declared the winners. Just as the festivities are about to conclude while Champa gives his team death threats, Grand Zenō (全王), a mysterious "King of Universes", appears in the ring.
41	14	"Come, God of Dragons – And Pretty Please Grant My Wish!" / "Come Forth, Divine Dragon! And Grant My Wish, Peas and Carrots!"; Transliteration: "Ide deyo kami no ryū – soshite negai o kanaete chonmage!" (Japanese: 出でよ神の龍 そして願いを叶えてちょんまげ!)	Hideki Hiroshima	King Ryū	May 1, 2016	November 18, 2017
While appearing because of the Destroyers' conduct, Grand Zeno expressed enough interest in their tournament to organize one for all twelve universes with the other deities unnerved by Goku casually approaching the Omni-King. Champa proceeds to return to his universe to train his team the upcoming tournament. Beerus asks Bulma to find the seventh Super Dragon Ball with her tracker, with deductive reasoning provided by Android 18 and Monaka revealing that it is the planet they are on. Once Bulma provides the incantation, with the wish made in the Divine Language, Whis summons Super Shenron (スーパーシェンロン, Chāo Shénlóng) with Beerus secretly wishing for the restoration of the Sixth Universe's Earth. Vados informs Champa what Beerus wished for. Whis leaves Beerus and Monaka on Beerus' planet and departs for Earth. Monaka is then revealed to be an ordinary mail delivery man and aspiring fighter, Beerus awarding Monaka for his help motivating Goku and Vegeta. Goku, Vegeta, and the others from Earth return home.
42	15	"Trouble at the Victory Celebration! Showdown at Last?! Monaka vs. Son Goku!" / "A Chaotic Victory Party! Showdown at Last? Monaka vs. Goku!"; Transliteration: "Haran no shukushō kai! Tsuini taiketsu!? Monaka VS Son Gokū!" (Japanese: 波乱の祝勝会! 遂に対決!? モナカVS孫悟空)	Ken'ichi Takeshita	Toshio Yoshitaka	May 8, 2016	December 2, 2017
Bulma holds a celebration party at the Capsule Corporation following the tournament, with Beerus lying to her about relaying the invitation to Monaka as he and Whis know Goku would want to fight Monaka if he were to attend. But Monaka does attend due to Jaco making an order to the former's delivery company, forcing Beerus to come clean about Monaka while threatening the others to hide this from Goku. When Goku does arrive, Goten and Trunks suggest that Beerus disguise himself in a Monaka costume to fight Goku. Beerus agrees to the plan, the fight eventually ended by Whis and Pu'ar disguised as Beerus. With Goku none the wiser, everyone carries on with the festivities.
43	16	"Goku's "Ki" is Out of Control?! Looking After Pan is A Lot of Trouble!" / "Goku's Energy is Out of Control? The Struggle to Look After Pan"; Transliteration: "Gokū no "Ki" ga seigyo funō!? Pan no osewa de shikuhakku!" (Japanese: 悟空の「気」が制御不能!? パンのお世話で四苦八苦)	Takahiro Imamura	King Ryū	May 15, 2016	December 9, 2017
Due to over exerting himself from using the Kaiō-ken technique in his Super Saiyan Blue form against Hit, Goku has problems controlling his energy and is forced to take break to regain his strength. While Gohan and Videl are out, Goku and his family babysit Pan with the infant being fascinated with the stars. That morning, the Pilaf Gang attempt take advantage of Goku's powerless state with a giant robot, but they end up unintentionally stealing Pan while their robot turns into a ship that they accidentally launch them into the stratosphere. The pressure from the launch destroys their ship, but Pan is able to fly back home with her captives in tow. On their way home, Goku's family is relieved to find Pan even though they remain ignorant of her exploits.
44	17	"Seal of Planet Potofu – Secret of the Superhuman Water Is Unleashed!" / "The Seal of Planet Pot-au-feu; Secrets of the Unleashed Superhuman Water!"; Transliteration: "Potofu sei no fūin toki hanatareta – "Chōjin sui" no himitsu!" (Japanese: ポトフ星の封印解き放たれた"超人水"の秘密!)	Kazuya Karasawa	Yoshifumi Fukushima	May 22, 2016	December 16, 2017
While Monaka delivers a package to Bulma, Goten and Trunks sneak into his delivery truck and are accidentally taken to Planet Po-tau-feu where they encounter a group of space bandits are led by a teal humanoid called Gryll (グリル, Guriru) attempt to steal a key to a treasure Superhuman Water (超人水, Chōjin Mizu) from an elder named Potage (ポタジ; Potaji). By the time Vegeta and Jaco reach Po-tau-feu, they find the boys, Monaka and Potage fleeing from purple-skinned versions of Gryll's men which Vegeta dispatches. But the figures turn into a liquid that engulfs Vegeta and spits him out before assuming Vegeta's form
45	18	"Vegeta Disappears?! The Threat of Duplicated Vegeta!" / "Vegeta Disappears?! Menace of the Duplicate Vegeta!"; Transliteration: "Bejīta ga kieru!? Fukusei bejīta no kyōi!" (Japanese: ベジータが消える!? 複製ベジータの脅威!)	Ayumi Ono	Yoshifumi Fukushima	May 29, 2016	January 6, 2018
A powerless Vegeta is forced to escape with the others from the Vegeta duplicate and Gryll, Potage revealing the two to be extensions of a rogue bio-weapon called Commeson (コメソン, Komeson), which established the Superhuman Water legend by assuming the form and personalities of invaders that led to going berserk. The group also learn from Potage that the original will disappear once cloned, as was the case of the real Gryll and his men, unless the duplicate is destroyed in time. Goten and Trunks attempt to destroy the Duplicate Vegeta as Super Gotenks 3 before Goku senses them in dangers comes to their aid. As the Duplicate Vegeta acquired Vegeta's personality as a side effect, he fights his Commeson nature and dispatches the Duplicate Gryll so he can fight Goku.
46	19	"Goku vs. Duplicated Vegeta! Who's Gonna Win?!" / "Goku vs. the Duplicate Vegeta! Which One is Going to Win?"; Transliteration: "Gokū VS fukusei Bejīta! Katsu no wa dotchida!?" (Japanese: 悟空VS複製ベジータ! 勝つのはどっちだ!?)	Masanori Satō	Yoshifumi Fukushima	June 5, 2016	January 13, 2018
Goku and the Duplicate Vegeta are evenly matched as a conflicted Vegeta eventually interfered to criticize both combatants to give it their all. As Goku and the Duplicate Vegeta quickly power up, Potage gives Vegeta the pacifier-like Commeson seal to suck on to buy himself more time, joining Trunks, Goten, and Jaco to find the Duplicate Gryll destroy the Commeson's core to weaken the Duplicate Vegeta. But the Duplicate Gryll revealed to his original state and chases them back to Vegeta as he tries to reach Trunks. Monaka accidentally steps on Commeson's core behind him, which damages it along with the Duplicate Vegeta. Potage notes that even though the core was destroyed, time has run out. Vegeta is disappearing. Realizing this is his last chance, Goku destroys the Duplicate Vegeta with the real Vegeta restored. Potage reseals the coreless Commeson. Goku thanks Monaka for his help and says that he would have been lost the match if it were not for him. With Po-tau-feu saved and the threat destroyed, Goku and the others return to Earth save and safe. Meanwhile, in an annihilated alternate timeline, Future Trunks looks to destroy a new and dark threat that has been terrorizing his world.

=== Goku Black / Zamasu Saga (2016–2017) ===
No. overall	Saga No.	Title	Directed by	Written by	Original air date	English air date
47	1	"An SOS from the Future! A Dark New Enemy Emerges!!" / "SOS from the Future: A Dark New Enemy Appears!"; Transliteration: "Mirai kara no esuōesu! Kuroki arata na teki arawaru!" (Japanese: 未来からのSOS! 黒き新たな敵現る!!)	Kōhei Hatano	Atsuhiro Tomioka	June 12, 2016	January 20, 2018
Goku shows his new farm to Chi-Chi and Goten, tricking Piccolo into a harvesting competition for training until Krillin arrives and accidentally reveals that Vegeta is training with Whis. Goku uses instant transmission to reach Beerus's planet, offering the Destroyer a ball of lettuce while learning that Zeno is not a fighter but has the power to erase entire universes as there had originally been 18 universes instead of the current 12 universes. Meanwhile, in an alternate timeline, Future Trunks is running from a mysterious dark enemy named Black who is terrorizing the Earth. Trunks meets up with Future Bulma who finally finished preparing the fuel needed for the time machine to make its trip to the past. But Black tracked Trunks to their hideout with Bulma urging her son to leave without her as she is killed soon after. Trunks later meets up with Future Mai, informing her of Bulma's death as they proceed to the ruins of Capsule Corp to reach the time machine. But Black intercepts them en route, seemingly killing Mai when she attempts to distract him so Trunks can reach the time machine. Future Trunks is enraged and looks at Black, revealed to be a Goku look-alike.
48	2	"Hope!! Once More Awaken in the Present, Trunks" / "Hope! Redux: Awaken in the Present, Trunks"; Transliteration: "Kibō!! Futatabi – Imade mezame yo Torankusu" (Japanese: HOPE(きぼう)!! 再び 現在で目覚めよトランクス)	Ryōta Nakamura	Atsuhiro Tomioka	June 19, 2016	January 27, 2018
Goku Black (ゴクウブラック, Gokū Burakku) taunts Future Trunks for failing to save his loved ones, provoking the youth to assume Super Saiyan form in a losing battle. But Future Trunks distracts Black with an energy attack long enough to reach the Time Capsule and escape 17 years into the past. Meanwhile, in the present timeline, Trunks is studying in class along with the Pilaf Gang, who were allowed to live in Capsule Corp. During recess, Trunks witnesses the Time Capsule arriving with Future Trunks inside. He immediately calls for his mother, who contacts Vegeta and Goku while Trunks and the Pilaf Gang are confused by the stranger having both Trunks's face and name. Bulma asks Trunks to power up in order for Goku to be able to teleport himself and Vegeta to their location, Whis and Beerus joining in to see what's going on. Vegeta asks Goku to get some Senzu beans. Goku goes to Korin's place to get some Senzu beans. Future Trunks regains consciousness, and attacks Goku upon assuming him to be Black.
49	3	"A Message from the Future – Goku Black Strikes!" / "A Message From the Future – The Incursion of Goku Black!"; Transliteration: "Mirai kara no messēji – Gokū Burakku shūrai!" (Japanese: 未来からのメッセージ ゴクウブラック襲来!)	Hideki Hiroshima	Atsuhiro Tomioka	June 26, 2016	February 3, 2018
Goku holds Future Trunks off long enough for Bulma to calm him down, Future Trunks is formally introduced to everyone present while being informed of the events that occurred since the Cell incident. Future Trunks reveals that after he prevented the revival of his timeline's Majin Buu, Goku Black appeared and massacred most of humanity with only him and few remaining people fighting him in a losing battle. Bulma deduces that Future Trunks came back in time to get reinforcements while finding a journal that her future self hid in the Time Capsule, Goku and Vegeta both intrigued while Beerus and Whis are astonished that humans are bold enough to mess with the affairs of time-space. Back in the alternate future, Black realizes Trunks traveled back in time as he uses his ring to open a tear in time to reaches the present as Future Trunks finished his spar with Super Saiyan 3 Goku to determine each other's power in Super Saiyan 2.
50	4	"Goku vs. Black! The Closed Path to the Future" / "Goku vs. Black! A Closed-Off Road to the Future"; Transliteration: "Gokū VS Burakku! Tozasareta mirai e no michi" (Japanese: 悟空VSブラック! 閉ざされた未来への道)	Ken'ichi Takeshita	Atsuhiro Tomioka	July 3, 2016	February 10, 2018
Goku Black arrives in the past, expressing an interest in fighting Goku and is able to hold his own against his Super Saiyan 2 form while Future Trunks wonders why Goku is holding back. The fight continue until the time distortion caused by the Time Capsule begins to fade, weakening the time tear as Black is being dragged back to the future. But he destroys the Time Machine as his final act in the present, Whis revealing Black used a Time Ring (時の指輪, Toki no yubiwa) that only Supreme Kais possess. But he and Beerus are astonished when Bulma reveals that she kept the other version of Time Machine that Cell used to travel back in time, intending to use her future self's journal to repair it. Just as Black reappears in the future timeline, Future Mai regains consciousness as his hand move.
51	5	"Feelings That Travel Beyond Time – Trunks and Mai" / "Feelings That Transcend Time: Trunks and Mai"; Transliteration: "Toki o koeta omoi – Torankusu to Mai" (Japanese: 時をこえた想い トランクスとマイ)	Takahiro Imamura	Atsuhiro Tomioka	July 10, 2016	February 17, 2018
While Future Trunks is waiting for Bulma to finish the repairs on the Time Capsule, Goku heads off to King Kai's planet to train after Beerus and Whis refused while both being curious about the sense of familiarity from Goku Black's energy. Future Trunks then notices Mai and recognizes her as the past version of the Mai he knew, revealing how Future Mai was a leader of Earth's resistance movement who died fighting to protect the planet. He also mentions Black's ultimate goal is eliminating everything he considers an inferior being. Meanwhile, excited from facing Goku, Black seeks to fight him again to become more accustomed to his body.
52	6	"Teacher and Student Reunited – Son Gohan and Future Trunks" / "Master and Pupil Reunited Gohan and "Future" Trunks!"; Transliteration: "Shitei saikai – Son Gohan to "Mirai" Torankusu" (Japanese: 師弟再会 孫悟飯と"未来"トランクス)	Kazuya Karasawa	Yoshifumi Fukushima	July 17, 2016	February 24, 2018
While Bulma and her team are still repairing the Time Machine, Future Trunks finds Piccolo and Krillin mending the damages in the wake of Goku's fight with Goku Black. Future Trunks learns from Piccolo that Gohan had become a scholar and is convinced to properly thank Gohan for his alternate self teaching him to fight. Future Trunks meets Gohan at the university before being invited to Gohan's house for dinner, the experience renewing his resolve to stop Goku Black. Future Trunks returns to the Capsule Corporation, learning that Goku, Beerus, and Whis have left to another universe to investigate the mystery behind Black's energy signature. Almost the end of the episode, a glimpse of a Supreme Kai is shown.
53	7	"Uncover Black's Identity! To the Sacred World of the Kais!" / "Uncover Black's Identity! Off to the 10th Universe's World of the Kai's!"; Transliteration: "Burakku no shōtai o abake! Iza dai 10 uchū no kaiōshin kai e!" (Japanese: ブラックの正体を暴け! いざ第10宇宙の界王神界へ!)	Hideki Hiroshima	Toshio Yoshitaka	July 31, 2016	March 3, 2018
Goku, Beerus, and Whis arrive on the Tenth Universe's World of the Kais (界王神界, Kaiōshin Kai) where they meet the resident Supreme Kai Gowasu (ゴワス) and his apprentice Zamasu (ザマス), who expresses a disdain for mortals. An excited Goku challenges Zamasu to a sparring match, the Kai objects until Gowasu allows it with Beerus advising him to not hold back. Zamasu is baffled at being outmatched against Goku while Beerus and Whis note the Kai's energy being similar to Goku Black's, with Zamasu having no recollection of meeting Goku, and that the Time Rings in Gowasu's possession are accounted for. Goku, Beerus, and Whis return to their universe, unaware their actions only strengthened Zamasu's ideology. On Earth, Krillin introduces Future Trunks to his family, with Android 18 teasing Trunks due to his history with her alternate future self.
54	8	"The One Who Inherits the Saiyan Blood – Trunk's Resolve" / "He Who is of Saiyan Blood: Trunks's Resolve"; Transliteration: "Saiya-jin no chiohikumono – Torankusu no ketsui" (Japanese: サイヤ人の血をひく者 トランクスの決意)	Masanori Satō	King Ryū	August 7, 2016	March 10, 2018
While Bulma and her team put the finishing touches to the rebuilt Time Machine, Vegeta decides to test Future Trunks' power to see how strong his son had become and overpowers him in Super Saiyan Blue form. Vegeta is vexed over Future Trunks being content with him and Goku being strong enough to defeat Goku Black, telling his son that Saiyans should continually strive to grow stronger to always prepare for an enemy. On Beerus' planet, Beerus and Whis are about to eat dinner when Zeno contacts them with a request to see Goku. In the Tenth Universe, Gowasu attempts to have Zamasu reconsider his views on mortals by temporary promoting him to Supreme Kai and use a Time Ring to observe the progress of a new race on Planet Babari (惑星ババリ, Wakusei Babari) within a millennia's time.
55	9	"I Want to See Son Goku – Zen-Oh Sama's Summoning!" / "I'd Like to See Goku, You See A Summons From Grand Zeno!"; Transliteration: "Son Gokū ni aitai no ne – Zenō-sama kara no yobidashi!" (Japanese: 孫悟空に会いたいのね 全王様からのよびだし!)	Takao Iwai	Atsuhiro Tomioka	August 21, 2016	March 17, 2018
In the Tenth Universe, Gowasu is unable to change Zamasu's perspective about mortals while his apprentice kills a Babari that attacks them. Gowasu scolds his student and says such behavior goes against his teaching of maintaining the balance between good and evil, Zamasu expresses his view that mortals are evil and their extermination is justice. Back in the Seventh Universe, Whis and Beerus reluctantly heed Zeno's request and summon Goku with instructions to keep quiet about Goku Black and time-traveling. As only Supreme Kais can reach Zeno's palace within minutes, Beerus instructs Whis to let nothing happen to the current Seventh Universe Supreme Kai as Goku learns that a Destroyer can die if their Supreme Kai counterpart is killed. Goku, Whis, and Shin reach Zeno's palace. Zeno says that all he wanted was a friend to play with when he feels like having fun, allowing Goku to leave after he promises to return with a better friend for him to play with. Before Goku leaves, Zeno gives him a button that would summon him. Shortly afterwards, Goku, Beerus, and Whis leave for Earth, where the Time Machine has been repaired. Goku, Vegeta, and Future Trunks arrive into Future Trunks' alternate timeline. As soon as they arrive, Goku is attacked by the Earth's resistance forces who mistook him for Goku Black.
56	10	"Rematch With Goku Black! Super Saiyan Rosé Appears" / "Rematch with Goku Black! Enter Super Saiyan Rosé"; Transliteration: "Saisen Gokū Burakku! Sūpā Saiya-jin Roze tōjō!!" (Japanese: 再戦ゴクウブラック! 超(スーパー)サイヤ人ロゼ登場!!)	Kōhei Hatano	King Ryū	August 28, 2016	March 24, 2018
Future Trunks quickly pacifies the resistance fighters by explaining that Goku and Vegeta are allies, reunited with Future Mai as they reach the resistance's new refuge after Goku Black attacked them. Goku spots Future Yajirobe (未来のヤジロベー, Mirai no Yajirobē), who was assumed to have died during the Androids' attack but was saved by a Senzu bean Korin gave him. After beating Goku at Rock-paper-scissors, telling Future Trunks to only observe, Vegeta calls out Black and fights him in Super Saiyan Blue form. But Black's battle with Goku allowed him to fully master his powers as he transforms into a pink-haired form he dubbed Super Saiyan Rosé (超サイヤ人ロゼ, Sūpā Saiya-jin Roze), overpowering Vegeta before critically wounding him with a hand stab. Goku quickly assumes Super Saiyan Blue to fight Black, Vegeta revealing their opponent has an advantage over Goku as well. Just as Black readies a Rose Kamehameha, Zamasu suddenly intervenes and reveals himself as Black's partner while reminding him that he is supposed to kill Goku.
57	11	"The God With the Immortal Body – Zamasu Descends" / "A God with an Invincible Body – The Advent of Zamasu"; Transliteration: "Fujimi no karada o motsu kami – Zamasu kōrin" (Japanese: 不死身の体を持つ神 ザマス降臨)	Ryōta Nakamura	Toshio Yoshitaka	September 4, 2016	March 31, 2018
Zamasu states himself and Goku Black as "kindred spirits" desiring a utopia without mortals before attacking Goku, ultimately allowing Black to join the fray as Future Trunks aids Goku. During the battle, Zamasu reveals to have made his body indestructible to all forms of attack while grabbing Goku and Future Trunks so Black can take them out with a Rose Kamehameha. Zamasu and Black decide to finish them off as a badly wounded Vegeta saves Goku and Future Trunks with a Final Flash as Future Yajirobe spirits them off a safer location. Before Goku Black and Zamasu are able to finish off Vegeta, Future Mai and the resistance soldiers intervene and rescue Vegeta. Goku and the others return to their timeline using the Time Machine. Future Mai and Future Yajirobe are left behind. Back in the present in the Tenth Universe, the past version of Zamasu sees a recording of the tournament between the Sixth and Seventh Universes and expresses disgust that Goku can harness divine energy. Zamasu also developed an interest in the Super Dragon Balls.
58	12	"Zamasu and Black – The Mystery of the Two Deepens" / "Zamasu and Black – The Duo's Mystery Deepens"; Transliteration: "Zamasu to Burakku – Fukamaru futari no nazo" (Japanese: ザマスとブラック 深まる二人の謎)	Hideki Hiroshima	Toshio Yoshitaka	September 11, 2016	April 7, 2018
Zamasu travels to Master Zuno's planet to force him into tell him about the Super Dragon Balls. At Capsule Corporation, Bulma nurses Goku, Vegeta, and Future Trunks before Beerus and Whis arrive with Shin, who reveals Zamasu's visit to Zuno. After the deities learn of the group's experience in the future, Whis theorizes that Zamasu used the Super Dragon Balls to create an ally in Goku's form and later an indestructible body. But Beerus points out that there is still the mystery behind Goku Black possessing a Time Ring and his energy matching Zamasu's, Future Trunks proposing that Zamasu might had killed Gowasu to become Supreme Kai and gave Goku Black the Time Ring. Shin takes Goku, Beerus, and Whis to Universe Ten to see if the theory is sound, Beerus keeping Goku from revealing the truth as he makes an inquiry on Zamasu's behavior from Gowasu. Gowasu expresses his apprentice's doubts regarding the role of a Supreme Kai and their relationship with mortals, but felt no need for concern before Zamasu arrives.
59	13	"Protect Supreme Kai Gowasu – Destroy Zamasu!" / "Protect The Supreme Kai Gowasu – Destroy Zamasu!"; Transliteration: "Kaiōshin Gowasu o mamore – Zamasu o hakai seyo!" (Japanese: 界王神ゴワスを守れ ザマスを破壊せよ!)	Kazuya Karasawa	Yoshifumi Fukushima	September 25, 2016	April 14, 2018
Whis gifts Gowasu with rice cakes and green tea, apologizing for his group disturbing him and Zamasu as they leave. But Beerus and Whis sensed Zamasu's murderous intention with the group remaining in space to observe him and Gowasu. When Zamasu does murder his master, Whis reverses time to avert the Supreme Kai's death. Furious that his plan was foiled, Zamasu decides to attack Goku before Beerus intervenes and atomizes the Kai. Back on Earth, after being convinced by his younger self to stop feeling bad about himself, Future Trunks learns that the present day Zamasu was destroyed with Beerus assuring him that all future versions of the Kai would also cease to exist regardless of alternate timelines. But in the future, Zamasu and Goku Black are discussing their Project 0 Mortals plan and the irony that it was only possible because of a mortal's power.
60	14	"Back to the Future – Goku Black's Identity Is Revealed!!" / "Into the Future Once Again – Goku Black's True Identity Revealed!"; Transliteration: "Futatabi mirai e – Akasareru Gokū Burakku no shōtai!!" (Japanese: 再び未来へ 明かされるゴクウブラックの正体!!)	Takahiro Imamura	Atsuhiro Tomioka	October 2, 2016	April 21, 2018
While Beerus is confident that the death of the present Zamasu has solved the crisis, Future Trunks expresses some skepticism and needs to return to his timeline to see for himself. Future Trunks proceeds to explain to Trunks the nature of alternate timelines while expressing some hope that Beerus's god status might actually averted Black's existence as he is joined by Goku, Vegeta, and Bulma. Once they arrive, the group find nothing has changed as the Saiyans and Bulma regroup with the Resistance as Future Trunks uses a senzu bean to heal Mai. The Saiyans then sense Zamasu and Goku Black approaching and face them, Goku calling Black out as a clone created by Zamasu using the Super Dragon Balls. But Black reveals himself to be Zamasu, explaining that he used the Super Dragon Balls to switch bodies with another version of Goku before killing him.
61	15	"Zamasu's Ambition – The Awful "Zero Mortal Plan" Is Revealed" / "Zamasu's Ambition – The Storied "Project 0 Mortals" of Terror"; Transliteration: "Zamasu no yabō – Katarareru kyōfu no "Ningen 0 keikaku"" (Japanese: ザマスの野望 語られる恐怖の『人間0計画』)	Takahiro Imamura	Kazuya Karasawa	October 9, 2016	April 28, 2018
Goku Black explains that he is Zamasu from a pre-altered main timeline where he succeeded in killing Gowasu, the Time-Ring allowing him to be unaffected by his past self's death. The other Zamasu then formally introduces himself as the Zamasu of Future Trunks' timeline, whom Black allied himself with as they destroyed the Super Dragon Balls after using them to grant Zamasu indestructibility. They then killed the other deities so they would not interfere in their goal of wiping all mortal life for their ideal utopia, saving Earth for last to have the humans suffer an agonizing demise. In the battle that follows, Future Zamasu and Black provoke Goku into giving the latter a challenge after revealing that Black also killed alternate Chi-Chi and alternate Goten when he acquired his new body and killed the alternate Goku. Black manage to defeat a very angry Goku before he and Future Zamasu turn their attention to Future Trunks and Vegeta, both telling the former that his constant meddling in the timeline is the reason for Earth's misfortune. This infuriates Future Trunks, who explodes and transforms into an immensely powerful Super Saiyan form, Super Saiyan Rage.
62	16	"I'll Protect the World! Trunks' Furious Super Power Explodes!!" / "I Will Defend the World! Trunks' Furious Burst of Super Power!"; Transliteration: "Sekai wa ore ga mamoru! Torankusu ikari no sūpā pawā sakuretsu!!" (Japanese: 世界はオレが守る! トランクス怒りの超(スーパー)パワー炸裂!!)	Takao Iwai	Atsuhiro Tomioka	October 16, 2016	May 5, 2018
Future Trunks tries out his Super Saiyan Rage form against Black and Future Zamasu, but he is only able to hold them off while Goku, Vegeta, and Bulma retreat back into the present after they give Future Mai the Zenzu Beans. Goku is taken for medical treatment while Vegeta explains what happened in Future Trunks' timeline and Black's origin to Beerus and Whis with the former taking his leave as he only remained to learn Black's connection to Zamasu. Meanwhile, Chi-Chi and Gohan meet with Krillin to ask if he knows where Goku went while finding Goten with Trunks as he intends to travel to the future. After everyone assembles, they discuss how to defeat Black and Future Zamasu when Piccolo proposes using the Evil Containment Wave (魔封波, Mafūba) which was used on his previous incarnation. Goku decides to learn the technique from Master Roshi's while Vegeta trains in the Hyperbolic Time Chamber. Elsewhere, Beerus approaches Gowasu to deal with his wayward apprentice.
63	17	"Don't Disrespect Saiyan Cells! Vegeta's Heroic Battle Begins!!" / "Don't You Disgrace Saiyan Cells! Vegeta's Fierce Battle Commences!"; Transliteration: "Saiya-jin no saibō o kegasu na! Bejīta no sōzetsu batoru kaien!!" (Japanese: サイヤ人の細胞を汚すな! ベジータの壮絶バトル開演!!)	Masanori Satō	Yoshifumi Fukushima	October 23, 2016	May 12, 2018
After being saved by the resistance, Future Trunks comes to and learns of Future Mai has found the villains's hideout and saves her after her failed attempt to snipe Black. Future Trunks fights the two again and fails after attempting a suicide attack to destroy Future Zamasu's immortal body, Goku and Vegeta arriving just in time to save him. Goku Black damages the Time Machine to prevent them from escaping again as Gowasu appears with Shin in an attempt to reason with his wayward apprentice. But Black and Future Zamasu reveal their actions of slaughtering the other deities, with Goku learning that a God of Destruction's death means their angel attendant like Whis enters an inactive state until a replacement appears. Future Zamasu and Black attempt to kill Gowasu before Goku and Vegeta intervene and battle them while Bulma begins repairing the Time Machine and having Future Trunks repair the sealing urn which Goku brought. Vegeta gets the upper hand over Black due to his training, denouncing his opponent as a thief who never worked to gain his power like any real Saiyan would.
64	18	"Revere Him! Praise Him! Fusion Zamasu's Explosive Birth!!" / "Worship Me! Give Praise Unto Me! The Explosive Birth of a Merged Zamasu!"; Transliteration: "Agameyo! Tataeyo! Gattai Zamasu bakutan!!" (Japanese: 崇めよ! 讃えよ! 合体ザマス爆誕!!)	Kazuya Karasawa	Toshio Yoshitaka	October 30, 2016	May 19, 2018
Vegeta continues overpowering Goku Black, who deduced rage as a factor in Saiyan's power increasing and uses the method to increase his strength enough to cut a rift in space. Black proceeds to keep Goku and Vegeta at bay with his energy duplicates of himself while Future Zamasu goes after Future Trunks, Future Mai, and Bulma as they attempt to repair the Time Machine. Giving Future Trunks and Mai a video of Piccolo teaching her the Evil Containment Wave, Bulma attempts to buy them time by flirting with Future Zamasu and nearly gets herself killed. Luckily, Trunks arrives and uses the Evil Containment Wave to trap Future Zamasu in the jar. But learns that Goku forgot to bring the charm needed to stabilize the seal, a traumatized and weakened Future Zamasu breaks free as everyone regroups. Realizing that they can no longer underestimate their enemies, Black and Future Zamasu use their Potara earrings to fuse into an immensely powerful god.
65	19	"Is This the Final Judgement?! The Ultimate Power of the Absolute God" / "Final Judgement? The Ultimate Power of an Absolute God"; Transliteration: "Saigo no shipan ka!? Zettai shin no kyūkyoku no pawā" (Japanese: 最後の審判か!? 絶対神の究極の力(パワー))	Kōji Kawasaki	King Ryū	November 6, 2016	June 2, 2018
Immensely fused into an more powerful god while possessing the abilities of his components, Zamasu displays his power by devastating the Earth in the process while overpowering Goku and Vegeta. Future Trunks decides to rejoin the fight, but he is also overpowered while using his Galick Gun to hold off Zamasu's Holy Wrath attack. Vegeta aids Trunks with his Galick Gun and overpower Zamasu's attack, though he survives unscathed because he is immortal. Vegeta barely saves Future Trunks from a deadly attack before being knocked out as Zamasu charges a second attack before Goku intervenes with his Kamehameha. The episode ends with the Energy Clash being left on a cliffhanger, with Zamasu calling Goku a filthy mortal as he says he won't best him, followed by Goku commanding him to try.
66	20	"The Climactic Battle! The Miraculous Power of a Relentless Warrior!" / "Showdown! The Miraculous Power of Unyielding Warriors"; Transliteration: "Kessen! Akiramenai senshi-tachi no kiseki no pawā!" (Japanese: 決戦! あきらめない戦士たちの奇跡の力(パワー)!)	Ryōta Nakamura	Atsuhiro Tomioka	November 13, 2016	June 9, 2018
Continuing from where the Energy Clash left off, Goku kicks off the episode with a bang as he puts everything into his Kamehameha to injure Zamasu's right side, and ends up injuring his arms before using his Kaio-ken technique to knock Zamasu down after he grabs his foot, Goku collapses by using his technique while Zamasu begins to improperly heal. Gowasu assumes that Black's mortal body is disrupting Future Zamasu's inmo body. Goku decides that the only way they can win is for him and Vegeta to fuse using Shin's Potara earrings, and Vegeta reluctantly agrees after Gowasu explains that a Potara fusion that does not involve a Supreme Kai only lasts for one hour. The newly fused Vegito powers up to Super Saiyan Blue, who loudly dubs himself "Vegito Blue", and battles Zamasu who eventually turns the table after admitting that becoming half-mortal was intended to remain true to his goals. Gowasu considers his apprentice becoming an embodiment of everything he hates after Vegito causes Zamasu to reach his rage-breaking point. Meanwhile, after the survivors regroup with Bulma and Future Mai as they finish repair the Time Machine. Future Mai gives Future Trunks his broken sword, which inspires him to keep fighting as he channels his energy through it, creating a Light Sword. Future Trunks arrives in time as Vegito's fusion abruptly ends in one hour as the result of his immense power. Future Trunks unknowingly begins gathering energy from all living things on Earth and creates a Spirit Bomb which he channels into his Light Sword and creating a Spirit Bomb Sword. He uses it to run through Zamasu and ends the episode by cutting him in half.
67	21	"With New Hope!! In Our Hearts – Farewell, Trunks" / "With New Hope in His Heart – Farewell, Trunks"; Transliteration: "Aratana kibō!! O mune ni – saraba Torankusu" (Japanese: 新たなHOPE(きぼう)!! を胸に さらばトランクス)	Morio Hatano	Atsuhiro Tomioka	November 20, 2016	June 16, 2018
The bifurcated Zamasu expresses his disbelief of finally being defeated as he disintegrates, the victory short-lived as Zamasu transcended his physical form and is now merging himself with the universe. Infinite Zamasu wipes out everyone on Earth with only Goku and company remaining while proceeding to bleed himself into all space and time. Goku looks for another Senzu Bean in his pocket when he instead finds the button that Zeno gave him, summoning the future timeline's Grand Zeno. After Goku explains the situation, Future Grand Zeno erases the future multiverse with the Supreme Kais returning to the past while Goku and the others escape using the Time Machine as Zamasu ceases to complety exist. Once the group return to the present, Goku and Future Trunks return to what remains of the future timeline to retrieve Future Zeno. Goku then has Shin take him and Present Zeno to give him Future Zeno as the promised playmate with the Grand Minister (大神官, Daishinkan) expressing astonishment to his son Whis. Whis later suggests Future Trunks and Future Mai to travel to a point in their timeline before Zamasu became a threat where he can be removed by Beerus, though it would mean they would co-exist with the new timeline's versions of them. Future Trunks and Future Mai accept the solution and depart for a new future.
68	22	"Come Forth, Shenron! Whose Wish Will Be Granted?"; Transliteration: "Ideyo Shenlong! Kanaeru negai wa dare no mono!?" (Japanese: いでよ神龍(シェンロン)! 叶える願いは誰のもの!?)	Takao Iwai	Atsuhiro Tomioka	November 27, 2016	June 23, 2018
Bulma attempts to secretly build her own Time Machine with no success due to needing a rare crystal that can currently be found in the Earth's core, keeping her activities a secret from Goku as he begins to gather the Dragon Balls to use one of the two unused wishes to revive King Kai. Beerus and Whis arrive on Earth soon after, Bulma taking them to a seafood restaurant to keep them in the dark. When Goku summons Shenron to provide with the wish, Android 18, Roshi, Oolong, Trunks and Goten all show up and an argument ensures. The argument worsens after the group allow Gohan to use one of the wishes to heal Pan of her fever, Bulma arriving and talking mostly everyone out of their wishes. Bulma then convinces Goku to travel to the center of the Earth to get the crystal for her in return for the last wish, only for the deities to realize what she's up to after they left the restaurant. Beerus spares Bulma while destroying the crystal and all traces of the Time Machine's existence from Bulma's lab to make his point across. The Dragon Balls then suddenly scatter as Goku was about to make his wish, King Kai gets furious and Goku promises that he will get another chance once the Dragon Balls reactivate.
69	23	"Goku vs. Arale! A Ridiculous Battle Will End the Earth?!" / "Goku vs. Arale! An Off-the-Wall Battle Spells the End of the Earth?"; Transliteration: "Gokū VS Arare! Hachamechabatoru de Chikyū ga owaru!?" (Japanese: 悟空VSアラレ! ハチャメチャバトルで地球が終わる!?)	Masanori Satō	Yoshifumi Fukushima	December 4, 2016	June 30, 2018
Vegeta, Bulma, and Trunks attend a science competition that is hosted by Mr. Satan, with Goku hired for security. Dr. Senbei Norimaki of Penguin Village wins the award for his Reality Machine that conjures any item the user can think of. The ceremony is interrupted by the ghost of Dr. Norimaki's nemesis Dr. Mashirito, who used a chemical called Playtime-X to increase the hyperactive tendencies of Norimaki's powerful robot daughter Arale Norimaki to destructive levels. Vegeta attempts to stop Arale, but is sent flying after being overwhelmed by her strength and cartoon physics. Goku, recognizing Arale from when they met in his youth, transforms into Super Saiyan Blue with both equally matched. Bulma fears the fight could destroy the world, and uses the collective thoughts of the viewing audience with the Reality Machine to create a mass of delicious food. This attracts Beerus, who obliterates Dr. Mashirito when he interrupts the God of Destruction. Before he can do the same to Arale, the ingested food causes him severe stomach pain and prompts him to rush home with Whis. Shortly afterwards, Dr. Norimaki and Arale leave and return home, with Goku and Arale agreeing to fight again in the future.
70	24	"Champa's Challenge! This Time We Fight with Baseball!!" / "A Challenge From Champa! This Time, a Baseball Game!"; Transliteration: "Shanpa kara no chōsen-jō! Kondo wa yakyū de shōbuda!!" (Japanese: シャンパからの挑戦状! 今度は野球で勝負だ!!)	Hideki Hiroshima	King Ryū	December 11, 2016	July 7, 2018
Champa contacts Beerus and challenges him to a friendly game of baseball (野球, Yakyū) between their teams on the Seventh Universe's Earth, though Champa is using the game as an opportunity to help himself to Earth's food as Vados convinces him to join in the game. As Hit and Frost are absent, Vegeta and Goten take their spots in the Sixth Universe team. The baseball game begins with Goku as pitcher, though it is ultimately revealed that Yamcha is the only participant with experience in baseball. The Seventh Universe team take bat with Yamcha getting himself injured several times from stealing bases but staying safe, one such moment resulting in Beerus and Champa engaging each other in a fierce fight that threatens reality before Whis and Vados intervene and call the baseball game off. Vados reveals that Yamcha actually stole home while everyone was distracted by the Gods of Destructions' fight, with his team winning the game by one point, Champa's obsession of training his team for a rematch apparently making him forgot his initial goal.
71	25	"The Death of Goku! The Guaranteed Assassination Mission" / "Goku Dies! An Assassination That Must Be Executed!" ("Goku Defeated! An Order That Must Be Executed!"); Transliteration: "Gokū shisu! Zettai shikkō no ansatsu ninrai!" (Japanese: 悟空死す! 絶対執行の暗殺任頼)	Kazuya Karasawa	Toshio Yoshitaka	December 18, 2016	July 14, 2018
Goten and Gohan notice their father Goku acting strangely as they spent all day following him before Gohan decides to direct the direct approach during dinner. It was after dinner that Goku admits to Gohan and Goten that someone wants to kill him. Elsewhere, as Vegeta notices Whis is hiding something while assuming Super Saiyan Blue to pass his training regime. Meanwhile, in the Sixth Universe, Hit finished assassinating a crime boss and learns his next target is Goku. Goku senses Hit coming and flies off to a remote area where no one would get caught up in their fight, Hit arrives and assures Goku that he has more than his Time-Skip. Goku finds his attacks unable to hit a tangible Hit, seemingly killed with a single invisible blow to the heart as he fires his energy attack into the air before collapsing to edge of death as Piccolo, Gohan, and Goten arrive too late.
72	26	"Will There Be a Counterattack?! The Invisible Killing Strike!!" / "Will He Strike Back? The Unseen Killing Technique!"; Transliteration: "Hangeki naruka!? Mienai koroshi no waza!!" (Japanese: 反撃なるか!? 見えない殺しの技!!)	Takahiro Imamura	Toshio Yoshitaka	December 25, 2016	July 21, 2018
As it seemed Goku is beyond Piccolo's ability to heal, his heart is jump started when the energy attack he launched early in midair hits him. After telling his sons and Piccolo not to get involved, having deduced Hit's assassination technique to be an invisible energy blast, Goku leaves and calls Hit out as they resume their fight. Nearby, Champa and Vados are watching fight with the latter revealed to have served as an intermediary for Hit's client while explaining to Champa that the assassin uses the stored time from his Time Skips to create a pocket dimension which plays in his tangibility. They are later joined by Vegeta, Beerus, and Whis as Goku uses his power to damage Hit's pocket dimension with his a Kamehameha causing a double knockout. In the aftermath, Goku reveals himself as Hit's client with Whis and Vados helping set everything up so he can fight the assassin at his best. Hit takes his leave soon after, intent to fight Goku another time as the job has no deadline.
73	27	"Gohan's Misfortune! An Unexpected Great Saiyaman Movie?!" / "Gohan's Plight! The Preposterous Great Saiyaman Film Adaptation?!"; Transliteration: "Gohan no sainan! Gurētosaiyaman masakano eiga ka!?" (Japanese: 悟飯の災難! グレートサイヤマンまさかの映画化!?)	Takao Iwai	King Ryū	January 8, 2017	July 28, 2018
While Jaco takes a lunch break, he accidentally loses the custody of a parasitic alien named Watagashi (綿餓死). On Earth, Gohan and Videl learn that Mr. Satan is starring in a new superhero film: titled "Great Saiyaman vs. Mister Satan"! Gohan's family visit the set and are introduced to the film's leading actor, the famous yet self-absorbed Barry Kahn whose attempt of flirting with Videl is spurred in front of the film crew. Gohan later decides to serve as Barry's stunt double to impress Pan, Barry allowing it with the thought that it would embarrass and potentially maim him. But Gohan uses his powers as to easily take on the role. Gohan later dons the suit again for a fight against a pair of bank robbers from his past, one of them turned into a monster Gohan defeated before noticing Watagashi escape into a sewer. Though Bulma covers for him when the film crew nearly deduced him to be the real Great Saiyaman, Gohan's secret is found out by the film's co star Cocoa who blackmails Gohan into flying her around the city. But the two are attacked by Jaco as he assumes Great Saiyaman is Watagashi's host.
74	28	"For the Ones He Loves! The Unbeatable Great Saiyaman!!" / "For My Beloved Ones! The Indomitable Great Saiyaman!"; Transliteration: "Aisuru mono no tame ni! Fukutsu no Gurēto Saiyaman!!" (Japanese: 愛するもののために! 不屈のグレートサイヤマン!!)	Masanori Satō	King Ryū	January 15, 2017	August 4, 2018
Gohan managed to convince Jaco not to blast him and learns of Watagashi, whose species enhances people with inner darkness. Cocoa brings Gohan back to her apartment for a night-long rehearsal, being extorted by Barry to place Gohan in a scandalous situation for a tabloid photographer. Though Cocoa had a secret change of heart and attempted to get Gohan from the photographer, Barry took the pictures and attempts to present him as cheater to Videl. But Videl sees through Barry's actions as he is forced out after threatening to expose Gohan as Great Saiyaman, the film star parasitized by Watagashi soon after. The possessed Barry kidnaps Pan for a final showdown with Gohan, gradually turning into a monster who nearly kills Gohan. Videl and Pan express complete faith in Gohan's desire to protect them and call out to encourage him. Gohan transforms into "Super Great Saiyaman" and knocks out Barry with Watagashi extracted by Jaco. The film crew filmed the fight to use for their climax as it become a hit, with Cocoa extorting Barry to keep Gohan's secret or be exposed as the monster that attacked the city. Though Jaco regains custody of Watagashi, he ends up repeating the same mistake that led to the parasite's escape.
75	29	"Goku and Krillin Back to the Old Training Grounds" / "Goku and Krillin! Back to the Old Familiar Training Ground!"; Transliteration: "Gokū to Kuririn – Natsukashi no shugyō no ba e" (Japanese: 悟空とクリリン 懐かしの修行の場へ)	Ryōta Nakamura	Atsuhiro Tomioka	January 22, 2017	August 11, 2018
Goku seeks a sparring partner to train with, but mostly everyone is unavailable. Goku takes Goten's suggestion to ask Krillin, who is still working as a police officer. Krillin is grazed by a bullet during a shootout with a pair of burglars who Goku easily disarms. Krillin declines Goku's offer to spar, having gave up martial arts since he knows he would be no challenge for Goku. But Krillin reconsiders after being chastised by Android 18 and Marin wanting a strong dad. Goku and Krillin leave for Master Roshi's to train as they did when they were children, Krillin still no match for Goku even after the latter wears a heavy suit as a handicap. Roshi senses Krillin's self-doubt and takes a different approach by sending his students on a race to a heavily forested island to recover a rare herb. As a reward, Roshi offers to teach the winner a secret technique that can immensely increase the user's strength. On the island, Goku and Krillin meet Fortuneteller Baba who Roshi recruited to help relay their process. Goku and Krillin proceed into the forest, encountering familiar enemies emerging from a heavy fog.
76	30	"Defeat These Terrifying Enemies! Krillin's Fighting Spirit Returns!" / "Conquer the Terrifying Foes! Krillin's Fighting Spirit Rebounds!"; Transliteration: "Kowa teki o uchiyabure! Kuririn no tōshi futatabi!" (Japanese: 恐敵を打ち破れ! クリリンの闘志ふたたび!)	Hideki Hiroshima	Atsuhiro Tomioka	January 29, 2017	August 18, 2018
Android 18 and Marin arrive at Master Roshi's house, learning from him and Baba that Krillin and Goku have entered the "Forest of Terror" where they are facing constructs based on their memories. While Goku is able to deal with them, Krillin is having trouble the illusions of Tambourine, Frieza, Dabura, and the evil Majin Buu bring back memories of him getting killed. Overcome with fear, Krillin attempts to leave forest before and a Goku find the trees blocking their escape as they get separated. Krillin finds himself surrounded by the illusions, eventually realizing they are feeding on his energy. He heeds Roshi's training and calms himself down, which weakens the illusions. As a final challenge, Fortuneteller Baba summons an illusion of Super Shenron that ensnares Goku while he uses the Flying Nimbus to find Krillin. Krillin quickly frees Goku as the two use a combined Kamehameha blast to destroy the illusion, causing the Miracle Herbs to sprout up. Goku and Krillin return to Master Roshi's house with bags full of the herbs, Roshi admits that there is actually no secret technique though Krillin got his master's intended lesson and regained his confidence, disagrees. Krillin returns home and has Android 18 shave his head so he can resume his martial arts training as Goku arrives to spar.

=== Universe Survival Saga (2017–2018) ===
No. overall	Saga No.	Title	Directed by	Written by	Original air date	English air date
77	1	"Let's Do It, Zen-Oh Sama! The All-Universe Martial Arts Tournament!!" / "Let's Do It, Grand Zeno! The Universes' Best Tournament!!"; Transliteration: "Yarou ze Zenō-sama! Uchū ichi Budō-kai!!" (Japanese: やろうぜ全王様! 宇宙一武道会!!)	Kazuya Karasawa	Atsuhiro Tomioka	February 5, 2017	August 25, 2018
After being ambushed by robbers after selling his produce at a local farmer's market, Goku realizes he has grown rusty from not having a decent challenge as he and Goten decide to train with Whis after buying a treat to win his services. They head to the Capsule Corporation building, where Bulma reveals she is pregnant with her and Vegeta's second child. Goku heads out alone as Goten remains behind to train with Trunks while Vegeta declines the offer to remain by Bulma's side. While Beerus expresses disappointment over Goku during his training with Whis, he threatens the Saiyan to drop the subject concerning the martial arts tournament Grand Zeno was to hold. Goku disregards Beerus and uses Zeno's button to head to his realm, both the Present Grand Zeno and Future Grand Zeno having grown bored with a game as they decide hold the tournament. When he returns to Beerus' planet, Beerus angrily berates Goku over failing to realize the Zenos' childlike innocence and powers make them extremely dangerous. Goku then has Beerus and Whis take him to their universe's World of the Kais as Old Kai, Shin, and Kibito are visited by the Grand Minister arrives. He tells the group to assemble their ten most powerful warriors to compete in the "Tournament of Power" (力の大会, Chikara no Taikai).
78	2	"The Gods of Every Universe in Shock?! Losers Erased in the Tournament of Power" / "Even the Universes' Gods are Appalled?! The Lose-and-Perish Tournament of Power"; Transliteration: "Zen uchū no kami-sama mo don hiki!? Maketara shōmetsu "Chikara no taikai"" (Japanese: 全宇宙の神様もドン引き!? 負けたら消滅「力の大会」)	Takahiro Imamura	Atsuhiro Tomioka	February 12, 2017	September 8, 2018
The Grand Minister explains the details of the "Tournament of Power" and states that it will be held in the "Null Realm", a void where the competitors can fight to full potential, adding that winner can have use the Super Dragon Balls while the losing universes are erased from existence. The Grand Minister also reveals that Goku and two other fighters will participate against three fighters from the Ninth Universe in a Zeno Expo for Future Grand Zeno's benefit. After the Grand Minister left to give them an hour preparation, an upset Beerus lashes at Goku for his stupidity while Whis explains that it would be dangerous to try talking Zenos out of the tournament. Beerus demands that Goku takes responsibility for his actions and recruit his two teammates, first recruiting Gohan at Vegeta's suggestion. Gohan joins after Videl encourages him to participate and learning of the consequences of losing, telling his father to keep the stakes a secret to prevent a mass panic. Goku also recruits Majin Buu, who is accompanied by Mr. Satan, the group traveling to the Zenos' palace where all the deities and angels gather. The Grand Minister explains the purpose of the Zenō Expo, alluding that Zenos might erase those among the fighters unfit for the Tournament of Power. In the first match of the Zenō Expo, Majin Buu faces the wolf-like Basil (バジル, Bajiru) of the Ninth Universe's Trio of Danger.
79	3	"Universe 9's Basil the Kicker VS Universe 7's Majin Buu!!" / "The 9th Universe's Kicking Basil vs. the 7th Universe's Majin Buu!!"; Transliteration: "Dai kyu uchū keri no Bajiru basasu Dai nana uchū Majinbū!!" (Japanese: 第9宇宙蹴りのバジルVS第7宇宙魔人ブウ!!)	Hiroshi Aoyama & Akio Yamaguchi	Atsuhiro Tomioka	February 19, 2017	September 15, 2018
Basil quickly gains the upper hand and beats down Majin Buu, who is not taking the fight seriously and thinks of it as a game. Goku goads Basil into showing his full power to get Majin Buu's attention, which leads to Basil using his ultimate attack. The Ninth Universe's Supreme Kai Roh (ロウ, Rō) assumes his fighter won when they see Buu still standing with a hole in his stomach. But upon Mr. Satan is injured during the attack, telling Buu to win before losing consciousness. This enrages Majin Buu to the point, where he effortlessly beats Basil and knocks him out of the ring. But as the Zenos are not yet satisfied, and the rules have not been finalized, Basil is allowed to resume the match as Roh gives him an enhancement drug which the Zenos allow despite Beerus's objections. Basil overpowers Majin Buu and seemingly beats him, which causes Roh to prematurely gloat about his universe's superiority. But Buu emerges unscathed, launching an attack that knocks out Basil and earn a victory for the Seventh Universe before healing Mr. Satan. The second match begins with Gohan facing Basil's second oldest brother, Lavender (ラベンダ, Rabenda) of the Trio of Danger, who is given permission to kill his opponent.
80	4	"Awaken Your Sleeping Battle Spirit! Son Gohan's Fight!!" / "Awaken Your Dormant Fighting Spirit! Gohan's Fight!"; Transliteration: "Nemutta tōshi o yobisamase! Son Gohan no tatakai!!" (Japanese: 眠った闘志を呼び覚ませ! 孫悟飯の闘い!!)	Kōhei Hatano	Atsuhiro Tomioka	February 26, 2017	September 22, 2018
Gohan commences his match with Lavender, who blinds him while exposing him to his poison mist. Gohan refuses Shin offering him a Senzu as he wants to fight with his strength alone, using his other senses to track Lavender by his footsteps before he counters by levitating in mid-air. Though Gohan responds by powering up to Super Saiyan and using his energy as a form of radar, it speeds the spread of the poison in his system before he manages to grabs Lavender in a hold before driving them into the ring at high speed. Though Lavender is knocked out, Gohan collapses from the poison taking its toll with the match declared a tie. After Goku feeds Gohan a Senzu bean, the Grand Minister announces to everyone in attendance that Goku's proposition for the Tournament of Power gave the Zenos a good reason to weed out the Universes whose Mortal Levels are below seven. The Grand Minister also reveals that the Angels of the universes designed with the lowest Mortal Levels like Whis are exempt from erasure. With the announcement concluded, the ring is repaired. In the third and final match of the Zeno Expo, Goku faces the oldest brother of the Trio of Danger, Bergamo (ベルガモ, Berugamo).
81	5	"Bergamo the Crusher Vs Son Goku! Which One Wields the Limitless Power?!" / "Bergamo the Crusher vs. Goku! Whose Strength Reaches the Wild Blue Yonder?"; Transliteration: "Tsubushi no Berugamo VS Son Gokū! Aotenjō no tsuyosa wa dotchida!?" (Japanese: 潰しのベルガモVS孫悟空! 青天井の強さはどっちだ!?)	Masanori Satō	Atsuhiro Tomioka	March 5, 2017	September 29, 2018
Before their battle begins, Bergamo denounces Goku as a threat to the multiverse while convincing the Zenos to rescind the tournament penalty for losing if he wins. The Zenos accept while the Grand Minister insists Goku to not hold back as the Zenos will immediately erase everything if he does. Both Goku and Bergamo agree to the terms as they commence their match, the latter revealing his ability to absorbs his opponent's attack to increase his size and power. Goku continues his attack until Bergamo became large enough that the ring is buckling under his weight, stunning the deities with his Super Saiyan Blue form as he quickly defeats Bergamo with a Kaio-ken powered Kamehameha. Bergamo claims every universe participating in the Tournament of Power will take out Goku and Seventh Universe for making them face erasure, but Goku relishes the idea of such a challenge. The Zeno Expo comes to a close with the Grand Minister explaining that the Tournament of Power will be a forty-eight minute battle royale with the winning universe decided by the most fighters remaining or the last fighter standing. The mysterious figure from the Eleventh Universe group, introducing himself as Top (トッポ, Toppo), leader of the Pride Troopers, challenges Goku to battle.
82	6	"Never Forgive Son Goku! Toppo the Warrior of Justice Intrudes!!" / "Goku Must Pay! The Warrior of Justice Top Barges In!"; Transliteration: "Son Gokū yurusumaji! Seigi no senshi Toppo ran'nyū!!!" (Japanese: 孫悟空許すまじ! 正義の戦士トッポ乱入!!)	Ayumi Ono	Toshio Yoshitaka	March 19, 2017	October 6, 2018
After the Eleventh Supreme Kai Khai (カイ, Kai) convinces the Zenos to allow his bodyguard to fight Goku, Top expresses his intent to punish Goku and quickly gains the upper hand by first dislocating the Saiyan's shoulder and then grabs him in a powerful bear hug to squeeze the life out of him. This forces Goku to turn Super Saiyan Blue to escape, managing to wound Top before the Grand Minister ends the fight as it might have ended with either killed. Goku accepts this, Top refusing to accept his hand in mutual respect while revealing that his comrade Jiren (ジレン, Jiren) is more stronger than himself. The Grand Minister begins creating a ring for the Tournament of Power, giving the deities a period of two days to assemble their teams. After returning their universe, Beerus and Goku get into an argument over the latter's easygoing attitude before Whis breaks it up. The group agrees to convene at the Capsule Corporation to discuss their strategy.
83	7	"Form the Universe 7 Representing Team! Who are the Strongest Ten?!" / "Field The All-7th-Universe Team! Who Are The Mighty Ten?"; Transliteration: "Dai-7 uchū daihyō chīmu o kessei seyo! Saikyō no 10-ri wa dareda?" (Japanese: 第7宇宙代表チームを結成せよ! 最強の10人は誰だ!?)	Hideki Hiroshima	Yoshifumi Fukushima	March 26, 2017	October 13, 2018
Goku and the others arrive at Capsule Corporation to discuss who should be on the team, Beerus still refusing to tell Goku the truth about Monaka while claiming him to be too sick to participate, and agree to enlist Earth's fighters. Goku and Gohan agree on Majin Buu, Vegeta, Piccolo, Krillin, Master Roshi, Android 18, and Android 17 for a total of nine, ruling out Trunks and Goten for their inexperience. They proceed to ask Vegeta, who has thought up a name for his unborn child and still refuses to participate in the Tournament of Power while Bulma is pregnant. Whis uses his time warping ability to speed up the infant's birth so Vegeta can participate, with everyone celebrating while Vegeta develops an attachment to his newborn daughter. While upset that he couldn't name her Eschalot, he settles for Bulma's naming their child Bulla. Goku leaves to recruit team members, starting with Krillin and 18.
84	8	"Son Goku the Recruiter Invites Krillin and No. 18" / "Goku the Talent Scout Recruit Krillin and Android 18"; Transliteration: "Sukautoman Son Gokū – Kuririn to 18-gō o izanau" (Japanese: スカウトマン孫悟空 クリリンと18号を誘う)	Kazuya Karasawa	King Ryū	April 2, 2017	October 20, 2018
Goku and Gohan arrive at Krillin's house and ask him and Android 18 to join the Tournament of Power, the latter encouraging her husband to participate before getting suspicious of Goku and Gohan until they lie about a 10 million Zeni reward to win her over. Gohan decides to test Krillin in a sparring match on the coast with the Tournament's rules, Krillin knocking Gohan into the sea after using the sense deprivation effect of his new Solar Flare x100 technique. An excited Goku is excited then challenges Krillin as well, relocating to a building owned by Mr. Satan where Krillin uses his strategy to compensate for the power difference between him and Goku's Super Saiyan form. Goku then transforms into his Super Saiyan Blue form as he overpowers Krillin in clash between their Kamehameha attacks before Android 18 intervenes and blocks Goku's Kamehameha. Krillin collapses from exhaustion, Android 18 reminding her husband that the Tournament of Power will be a battle royal and that Goku cannot expect to fight one-on-one all the time. Goku concedes the match and realizes he will have to adjust his tactics before asking for the whereabouts of Android 17. Android 18 reveals that she has not been in touch with her brother since he began working at a wildlife reserve, having no idea where it is. Goku decides to ask Dende to find Android 17.
85	9	"The Universes Begin to Make Their Moves Their Individual Motives" / "The Universes Go Into Action – Each With Their Own Motives"; Transliteration: "Ugokidasu uchū – sorezore no omowaku" (Japanese: 動き出す宇宙 – それぞれの思惑)	Takahiro Imamura	Atsuhiro Tomioka	April 9, 2017	October 27, 2018
Gohan leaves to recruit Piccolo, while Goku prepares to go to Dende's Lookout. He encounters Majin Buu and Mr. Satan training, learning the latter got pumped enough from the Zeno Expo to lose weight for a slimmer appearance. The two spar together with Buu the winner, getting tired as Goku leaves and reaches the Lookout where Dende knows all about the Tournament of Power. Dende agrees to help Goku find Android 17 while Gohan prepares to train with Piccolo. At the Eleventh Universe, not inviting Shin, Khai holds a secret meeting with the Supreme Kais for an attempted alliance to request a reprieve from the Zenos for their respective universes to reach the Mortal Level of 7. The Eleventh Universe's Destroyer Belmod (ベルモッド, Berumoddo) attends Champa's own secret meeting, with an upset Champa spurred into having Cabba recruit his fellow Sixth Universe Saiyans for their team. At the same time, Top recruits his fellow Pride Troopers Kahseral (カーセラル, Kāseraru) and Dyspo (ディスポ, Disupo) as they proceed to recruit Jiren, who is training in lone.
86	10	"Fists Cross for the First Time! Android #17 VS Son Goku!!" / "First Time Exchanging Blows! Android 17 vs. Goku!!"; Transliteration: "Hajimete majiwaru kobushi! Jinzōningen Jūnana-gō VS Son Gokū!!" (Japanese: 初めて交わる拳! 人造人間17号VS孫悟空!!)	Takao Iwai	Toshio Yoshitaka	April 16, 2017	November 3, 2018
As Dende has the Lookout travel to the island where the wildlife reserve is, he explains how Android 17 started a family and grew stronger since the aftermath of the Cell Games. He also requests Goku to mentor a child with great fighting potential who is the reincarnation of Kid Buu. Goku descends to the island, meeting Android 17 for the first time while helping him subdue an army of armed poachers. Android 17 later explains that the poachers are after the island's resident Minotaurus, the last of his species who were hunted for their horns. Goku and Android 17 decide to have a sparring match before the latter ends the match to keep the island from getting caught in the crossfire, both having held back throughout the fight. Goku later attempts to convince 17 to join the Tournament of Power, but the android is indifferent even after Goku reveals that all the losing universes will be erased from existence. Meanwhile, a group of space poachers arrive on Earth with their sights set on the Minotaurus.
87	11	"Hunt the Poachers! Goku and No. 17's United Front!!" / "Hunt the Poaching Ring! Goku and Android 17's Joint Struggle!"; Transliteration: "Mitsuryō-dan o kare! Gokū to Jūnana-gō no kyōtō!!" (Japanese: 密漁団を狩れ! 悟空と17号の共闘!!)	Akio Yamaguchi	Toshio Yoshitaka	April 23, 2017	November 10, 2018
As Android 17 considers Goku's offer when enticed with a wish on the Super Dragon Balls, they find the island's animals being abducted by the space poachers. Goku uses his Instant Transmission to teleport himself and Android 17 aboard their spaceship before it left Earth's atmosphere. Goku ends up dealing with the henchmen while Android 17 confronts and easily defeats the leader. Goku catches up just as the leader pulls out a switch, claiming to have a bomb implant he threatens to detonate if not released immediately. Android 17 smashes him out of a window into deep space before Goku manages to use his Instant Transmission to teleport them all to King Kai's planet, informed by Dende that the leader was bluffing about the bomb. Afterwards, Goku and Android 17 return the animals to their rightful homes while Jaco takes custody of the space poachers. Revealing his wish to take his family around the world on an expensive ship, Android 17 accept Goku's offer to fight in the Tournament of Power while entrusting the island to Goten and Trunks.
88	12	"Gohan and Piccolo Teacher and Pupil Clash in Max Training!" / "Gohan and Piccolo Master and Pupil Clash in Max Training!"; Transliteration: "Gohan to Pikkoro Shitei gekitotsu no Genkai shugyō!" (Japanese: 悟飯とピッコロ 師弟激突の限界修業！)	Masanori Satō	Toshio Yoshitaka	April 30, 2017	November 24, 2018
Piccolo reveals to Gohan that he already joined the Seventh Universe team after Goku informed of their universe's potential erasure, explaining his intent to put Gohan through intense training to reawaken his latent power while explaining one of the flaws in his pupil being his feelings for protect his loved ones are limiting his power. When Piccolo later removes his weighted clothes to go all out, he points out Gohan's other weakness being his arrogance which Super Buu once exploited. Though Gohan manifests a fraction of latent power, he lost the match due to his overconfidence after Piccolo blasts him in the back with the severed arm. That night, Piccolo vows to push Gohan to new heights of power and agrees that they should work on combination moves. Meanwhile, at the Sixth Universe, Cabba attempts to recruit his retired captain and mentor Renso (レンソウ, Rensou) for the Tournament of Power. But Renso refuses due to a leg injury, suggesting his stronger sister Caulifla (カリフラ, Karifura) in his stead.
89	13	"An Unknown Beauty Appears! The Tien shin-Style Dojo's Mystery?!" / "A Mysterious Beauty Appears! The Enigma of the Tien Shin-Style Dojo?"; Transliteration: "Arawareta nazo no bijo! Tien shin-ryū Dōjō no kai!?" (Japanese: 現れた謎の美女! 天津流道場の怪!?)	Hideki Hiroshima	Yoshifumi Fukushima	May 7, 2017	December 1, 2018
During Gohan's spar with Piccolo, Goku learns from Oolong that Master Roshi is serving as an honorary instructor at Tien's new martial arts dojo. Goku decides to make Tien the tenth member of the team as he heads there to recruit Roshi, arriving just after a woman named Yurin (ユーリン, Yūrin) enrolls at Roshi's behest despite Tien finding her apparent motivation unacceptable. As Goku fails to convince Tien to participate even mentioning the ten million Zeni prize, Yurin manages to escape Roshi and uses paper talismans to force Tien's students to destroy the town. The group confront Yurin, who reveals herself as a Crane School student seeking revenge on Tien ignoring her challenge the day he left their school. Roshi battles Yurin while the others subdue the students, only to be bewitched by Yurin while distracted from an accidental glimpse of her panties. The brainwashed Master Roshi quickly defeats Tien before Goku intervenes, managing to defeat him while Chiaotzu temporarily disables Yurin, Goku subdues Master Roshi with a Kamehameha and cures him of the brainwashing. Yurin attempts to run off until Tien allows her to remain his student as her desire of getting strong is genuine, though he has her apologize to the villagers. Tien decides to join the Tournament of Power because he believes that the ten million Zeni Goku promised will repair the village, Roshi eagerly following suit upon hearing about the ten million Zeni. Meanwhile, at the Sixth Universe, Cabba sways Caulifla into joining his team with the prospect of teaching her how to become a Super Saiyan.
90	14	"See The Wall That Must Be Passed! Goku vs Gohan" / "Staring Down the Wall to be Overcome Goku vs. Gohan"; Transliteration: "Koerubeki kabe o misuete! Gokū bāsasu Gohan" (Japanese: 超えるべき壁を見据えて! 悟空VS悟飯)	Takahiro Majima & Kōhei Hatano	King Ryū	May 14, 2017	December 8, 2018
As Gohan finishes training with Piccolo, they meet up with Goku, Master Roshi, Tien, and Chiaotzu. At Gohan's request, Goku and Tien have a fight against Gohan and Piccolo to practice for the Tournament of Power. Although Tien views this as a practice match and wants to avoid injuring anyone, Gohan and Goku take the fight seriously. As Gohan fights both his father and Tien, Piccolo spends the time charging a strong technique that ultimately destroys the mountain they were using as a ring. Though Goku agrees when Tien calls off the match, he accepts Gohan's request for a one-on-one fight that ends with Super Saiyan Blue Goku using the Kaio-ken to defeat Gohan. Goku expresses being impressed enough with Gohan that he assign his son as their team captain. Meanwhile, with Gowasu too flustered to the Tenth Universe's Destroyer Rumsshi (ラムーシ, Ramūshi) recruited a powerful fighter named Murichim (ムリチム, Murichimu) and his nine companions to represent them in the Tournament of Power.
91	15	"Which Universe Will Survive?! The Strongest Warriors Are Gathering!!" / "Which Universe Will Win Their Place? The Mighty Warriors Gradually Assemble!"; Transliteration: "Kachinokoru no wa dono Uchū da!? Zokuzoku to tsudou Saikyō no senshi-tachi!!" (Japanese: 勝ち残るのはどの宇宙だ!? 続々と集う最強の戦士たち!!)	Kazuya Karasawa	Toshio Yoshitaka	May 21, 2017	December 15, 2018
When the Zenos are bored with their latest game, the Grand Minister proceed to show the Seventh Universe along with the other universes' progress in assembling their teams. The Seventh Universe, Vegeta undergoes intense training in the Hyperbolic Time Chamber while his gravity chamber in Capsule Corp is used by Goku to spar with Whis. Master Roshi enlists Puar to train himself to overcome his perverted nature. The Zenos are then shown the other universes' progress, first with the Trio of Danger having trouble in recruiting fighters after the Ninth Universe has descended into chaos after its denizens heard of their potential erasure. In the Sixth Universe, his reputation in shambles since being exposed as criminal, a destitute Frost is approached by Hit for the tournament while relieved of his hidden arsenal. In the Eleventh Universe Kahseral is delayed from meeting up with Top as helps a cat stuck in a tree while the Second Universe depicts a magical girl named Brianne de Chateau (ブリアン・デ・シャトー, Burian de Shatō) transforming into her alter ego Ribrianne (リブリアン, Riburian) while on her way to audition for a spot on the Second Universe Two team. In the Tenth Universe, Murichim and his nine companions record a dance video to improve team spirit. The Zenos' attention is then redirected back to the Seventh Universe, as the group is horrified to unexpectedly learn from Mr. Satan that Majin Buu has fallen into a deep sleep.
92	16	"Emergency Development! The Incomplete Ten Members!!" / "A State of Emergency! Failure to Reach Ten Members!!"; Transliteration: "Kinkyū jitai hassei! Sorowanai jū nin no menbā!!" (Japanese: 緊急事態発生! そろわない10人のメンバー!!)	Takao Iwai	Atsuhiro Tomioka	May 28, 2017	January 5, 2019
As most of the members of the Seventh Universe team gather, Goku races to Mr. Satan's house and finds it impossible to wake Majin Buu up from his hibernation. By the time Goku returns, Piccolo had revealed the truth of the Tournament of Power to everyone with a betrayed Krillin confronting Goku about it with intention of dropping out like Android 18 and Tien. But Beerus threatens Krillin to remain while Bulma promises to compensate 18 and Tien for their help. With the group unable to figure out Buu's replacement, Beerus's rant of them wiping out potential recruits in the Frieza Force inspires Goku to recruit Frieza, to everyone's shock. Meanwhile, in the Sixth Universe, despite his failure to get her angry enough, Cabba teaches Caulifla the means of becoming Super Saiyan by focusing her energy around an area in her back. Caulifla is amazed by her new power, agreeing to join his team on the condition that her comrade Kale (ケール, Kēru) undergoes the transformation herself. While Top and Kahseral discuss entrusting the Eleventh Universe to Pride Trooper recruits in their absence, the deities of the Third Universe, Supreme Kai Eyre (エア, Ea) and Destroyer Mosco (モスコ, Mosuko), and Camparri (カンパーリ, Kanpāri) meet the cyborg Nigrissi (ニグリッシ, Nigrisshi) as he displays the modifications he made on Nigrissi (ニグリッシ, Nigrisshi) and the rest of their team.
93	17	"You're The Tenth Warrior! Goku Goes To See Frieza!!" / "You're Our Tenth Warrior! Goku Approaches Frieza!!"; Transliteration: "Jū ninme no senshi wa omē da! Gokū Furīza no moto e!" (Japanese: 10人目の戦士はおめえだ! 悟空 フリーザのもとへ!!)	Takahiro Imamura	Yoshifumi Fukushima	June 4, 2017	January 12, 2019
Despite everyone questioning his decision, revealing that Frieza's irredeemable nature keeps him trapped, Goku explains his intention to have Fortuneteller Baba resurrect Frieza for twenty four hours to fight in the Tournament of Power. Goku's friends reluctantly accept Goku's decision as he travels to Other World make the arrangements with King Yemma before visiting Frieza. After Goku explains about the Tournament of Power, Frieza accepts joining the group while having Goku promise to properly resurrect him with Earth's Dragon Balls should they win. But the Fourth Universe Destroyer's Quitela (キテラ, Kitera) is informed of Frieza's resurrection by his spy Ganos (ガノス, Ganosu) alongside his Angel Cognac (コニック, Konikku) and the Fourth Universe's Supreme Kai Kuru (クル, Kuru), Quitela intending to sabotage Beerus. Meanwhile, in the Sixth Universe, Cabba and Caulifla were unable to get Kale to turn into a Super Saiyan until her own frustration enrage her enough to trigger her transformation into an extremely powerful Super Saiyan Berserker. Kale immediately goes berserk by losing the control and attacks Cabba, Caulifla quickly deducing it as a jealous rage over her and Cabba's perceived relationship. Caulifla clarifies having no feelings for Cabba, causing Kale to revert his Base form and collapse in Caulifla's arms as Cabba notes of finding another addition for their team.
94	18	"The Emperor of Evil Returns! A Reception of Mysterious Assassins?!" / "The Evil Emperor Returns! A Reception from Mysterious Assassins?" ("The Evil Emperor Returns! A Reception from Mysterious Enforcers?"); Transliteration: "Aku no Teiō fukkatsu! Demukaeru Nazo no Shikaku-tachi!?" (Japanese: 悪の帝王復活! 出迎える謎の刺客たち!?)	Masato Mitsuka	Toshio Yoshitaka	June 11, 2017	January 19, 2019
Quitela contacts the Ninth Universe's Destroyer Sidra (シドラ, Shidora) and informs him of the potential danger of the Seventh Universe enlisting Frieza as they must secretly eliminate him, Sidra informing Roh of this as they agree to enlist assassins for the task. Back in the Seventh Universe, Goku informs the group of his success while enlisting Bulma's help for something to give to Baba for her services. As Master Roshi completes his training at Korin's tower, Krillin and Android 18 pick up Android 17 while leaving Goten and Trunks behind to watch over the island along with Marron. Goku goes to Fortuneteller Baba's home, where she completes the ritual to temporarily resurrect Frieza. As Goku and Frieza prepare to depart, they are confronted by the assassins. Frieza wounds their assassins' leader and intends to flex his power, despite time remaining for the tournament.
95	19	"The Worst! The Most Evil! Frieza's Rampage!!" / "Most Heinous! Most Evil! Frieza's Wild Rampage!"; Transliteration: "Saikyō! Saiaku! Furīza Ōabare!!" (Japanese: 最凶! 最悪! フリーザ大暴れ!!)	Akio Yamaguchi & Tatsuya Nagamine	King Ryū	June 18, 2017	January 26, 2019
Frieza explains to Goku that he spent his recent incarceration in Hell undergoing intense mental training to overcome the stamina issues that plagued him during his previous battles, slaughtering most of the assassins while Goku prevents them from taking Baba hostage. The assassins' leader attempts to take out Frieza with the orb of destructive power Sidra bestowed him, but Frieza overcomes and hijacks the attack. Frieza then spitefully uses the attack on Goku and traps him, while taunting him to break free. Frieza tortures and kills the remaining assassins before contacting Roh and Sidra, offering his services in return for a full resurrection and a place in the Ninth Universe. But Roh, seeing Frieza as too evil by his standards, argues against this with Sidra. Their argument buys time for Beerus and Whis to arrive and rescue Goku, while Frieza cuts the connection. Frieza begins making plans to use the Tournament of Power to manipulate the gods to suit his own ends. Goku and Frieza have a brief sparring match, to decide whether or not Frieza can act on his own, which ends in a draw. Goku, Frieza, Beerus, and Whis return to the Capsule Corporation. The Universe Seven team prepares to travel to the Null Realm for the Tournament of Power.
96	20	"The Time Is Here! To The World Of Void For The Fate Of The Universe!!" / "The Time Has Come! To the Null Realm with the Universes on the Line!"; Transliteration: "Toki wa kita! Uchū no Meiun o kake Mu no Kai e!!" (Japanese: 時はきた! 宇宙の命運をかけ無の界へ!!)	Masanori Satō	Hiroshi Yamaguchi	June 25, 2017	February 2, 2019
In the Null Realm, the Destroyers Iwan (イワン, Iwan) of the First Universe, Arak (アラク, Araku) of the Fifth Universe, and Liqueur (リキール, Rikīru) of the Eighth Universe have a brief exhibition match to test the durability of the Tournament of Power's ring, forced by the Grand Minister to repair it soon after. Back in the Seventh Universe, Gohan and Shin's plan out their team to stick together to conserve energy and use their numbers for defense with Goku and Vegeta not on board with it. Whis then contacts the Grand Minister to transports the team to the Null Realm as the other universes' teams arrive, the angel explaining that only deities and natural fliers can freely fly before he, Beerus, and the Kais take their seats. Frieza and Frost befriend each other and agree to work together, while Goku singles out Jiren as a potential rival from seeing his ability. As the Grand Minister introduces each team, the Fourth Universe appears to have only eight warriors on their team, which confuses most of the Seventh Universe team save for Tien, who tells his teammates that he can sense the faint presence of two warriors. After a speech from the Zenos, the eighty warriors prepare for battle.
97	21	"Survive! The "Tournament of Power" Begins at Last!!"; Transliteration: "Ikinokore! Tsui ni kaimaku Chikara no Taikai!!" (Japanese: 生き残れ! ついに開幕「力の大会」!!)	Hideki Hiroshima	Atsuhiro Tomioka	July 2, 2017	February 9, 2019
The Grand Minister relays rulings before officially starting the Tournament of Power, with Goku intercepted by Ganos when he targets Top. Vegeta, Frieza, and the Androids also disregard Gohan's plan with the rest of the team working together to fend off warriors from varying universes. The Third Universe gains an early advantage with Narirama's spinning attack until Hit and Basil disable it, the latter knocking out the Tenth Universe's Rylibeu (リリベウ, Riribeu) who is teleported to the stand after her loss. Basil nearly does the same to the Tenth Universe's Napapa (ナパパ, Napapa), who pushed the attack away at the last second. Goku encounters Jiren while pursuing Top, only to get grabbed by the Fourth Universe's Nink (ニンク, Ninku) who intended to drag Goku out of the ring with him. But Goku turns Super Saiyan Blue to break Nink's hold while knocking him off the stage. As Goku reverts to his normal form to conserve energy, he is surrounded by the Trio of Danger two other Ninth Universe warriors with forty-seven minutes remaining in the Tournament of Power.
98	22	"Oh, Uncertainty! A Universe Despairs!!" / "Ah, the Uncertainty! A Universe Despairs!"; Transliteration: "Ā mujou! Zetsubō suru Uchū!!" (Japanese: あぁ無常! 絶望する宇宙!!)	Takao Iwai	Yoshifumi Fukushima	July 9, 2017	February 16, 2019
Roh orders his warriors to attack Goku in order to avenge their defeat at the Zeno Expo, with Goku being overwhelmed by Trio of Dangers' teamwork while trying to avoid fighting to conserve stamina for later in the tournament. Vegeta notices Goku's plight and backs him up before Roh sends over three more warriors as they overwhelm the Saiyans with teamwork. But the plan fails when Lavender and Hop (ホップ, Hoppu)'s egos over finishing Vegeta resorted in the former's injury, allowing the Saiyans to exploit this and take most them out while Android 18 defeats Sorrel (ソレル, Soreru) and a traumatized Roselle (ローゼル, Rōzeru) disqualifies himself to escape Frieza. Only the Trio of Danger remain as they resort to a last ditch combination Triangle of Danger Ray attack before being knocked out of the ring when the Saiyans power up to Super Saiyan Blue and use a Final Kamehameha combined by Goku's Kamehameha and Vegeta's Final Flash. With all ten members eliminated from the Tournament of Power, the Zenos erase both the Ninth Universe and its representatives save the Angel Mohito (モヒイト, Mohi'ito) as he is amused by the turn of events.
99	23	"Show Them! Krillin's True Power!!" / "Show Them! Krillin's Underlying Strength!"; Transliteration: "Misetsukero! Kuririn no sokojikara!!" (Japanese: 見せつけろ! クリリンの底力!!)	Takahiro Imamura	Toshio Yoshitaka	July 16, 2017	February 23, 2019
While the other warriors regain their composure from seeing the Ninth Universe's erased, Android 17 reminds Android 18 that they have no reason to hold back due to their infinite stamina. Vegeta tries to fight Hit before being attacked by Botamo, attempting to throw him out before Auta Magetta intervenes with the two Sixth Universe fighters teaming up to remove their individual weaknesses. While the Tenth Universe's Dium (ジウム, Jiumu) is swiftly eliminated while attacking Gohan's group, the Fourth Universe's Shosa (ショウサ, Shōsa) tricks Android 18 into lowering her guard by playing possum death and nearly knocks her off the stage with a barrage of ki blasts, only for her to be saved by Krillin as the couple take Shosa out with a powerful combination attack. They are challenged by the Fourth Universe's Majora (マジョラ, Majora), a blind fighter whose powerful sense of smell allows him to pinpoint his enemies. But Krillin manages to disorientate Majora with his smelly shoe before knocking him out, getting knocked out of the ring himself by Frost while his guard is down. Beerus and Shin berate Krillin for his carelessness while forty-three minutes remain in the Tournament of Power.
100	24	"Out Of Control! The Savage Berserker Awakens!!" / "Rampage! A Crazed Warrior's Savagery Awakens!"; Transliteration: "Daibōsō! Mezame araburu Kyōsenshi!!" (Japanese: 大暴走! 目覚め荒ぶる狂戦士!!)	Kazuya Karasawa	King Ryū	July 23, 2017	March 2, 2019
While the Seventh Universe compensates from Krillin's defeat, Cabba defeats Nigrissi and the Tenth Universe's Murisam (ムリサーム, Murisāmu) before confronting Vegeta while Hit takes out an armless Narirama after using his time skip to dodge the robot's chest cannon. Meanwhile, Caulifla saves Kale from being thrown out by Napapa and his teammate Methiop (メチオープ, Mechiōpu), knocking the former out instead. Caulifla and Kale confront Goku with former interrupting his fight with the Second Universe Yardrat Jimizu (ジーミズ,, Jīmizu) while wanting to learn to enter Super Saiyan Blue form. Caulifla transforms into an Ultra Super Saiyan when Goku deems her too inexperienced to learn the technique, though he instead helps her attain Super Saiyan 2 form so they can fight properly. But Kale ends up assuming her Super Saiyan Berserker form as the result of being left out and being consumed by her feelings of uselessness, Hit saving Caulifla as their teammate attacks Goku in a jealous rage. Kale easily overwhelms Goku even after he enters Super Saiyan Blue and is unaffected by Kamehameha. As Piccolo realizes she has lost control of her power, Kale begins indiscriminately blasting the ring, taking out both Methiop and the Eleventh Universe's Vewon (ブーオン, Būon) before Jiren knocks her unconscious with a single ki blast. As Hit and Caulifla retreat with Kale, Goku challenges Jiren.
101	25	"The Impending Warriors of Justice! The Pride Troopers!!" / "Warriors of Justice Close In! The Pride Troopers!"; Transliteration: "Semari kuru seigi no senshi! Puraido Torūpāsu!!" (Japanese: 迫りくる正義の戦士！プライド・トルーパス！！)	Makoto Sonoda	Hiroshi Yamaguchi	July 30, 2017	March 9, 2019
As Goku prepares to fight Jiren before Top drives him off with a barrage of ki blasts, Top telling Jiren that Kahseral, Tupper (タッパー, Tappā), Zoire (ゾイレー, Zoirē), Cocotte (ココット, Kokotto), and Kettle (ケットル, Kettoru) will deal with Goku while they conserve their stamina. Goku ends up where Caulifla and Kale as Kahseral's group find them, deciding to go after Kale to avenge Vewon with the Sixth Universe Saiyans forced into a temporary alliance with Goku. Meanwhile, Master Roshi and Tien take out the Third Universe's Za Priccio (ザ・プリーチョ, Za Purīcho) before regrouping with Gohan, Piccolo, Vegeta, and Frieza, who has defeated Murichim. The Pride Troopers push Goku, Caulifla, and Kale to the brink until the Androids arrive to their aid. Android 17 easily overpowers Kahseral until he falls back to the others after learning Android 18 and Goku defeated Tupper. The remaining Pride Troopers focus their assault on the wounded Caulifla and Kale after the latter was sealed in pocket dimension by Cocotte, who forms another dimension to prevent Goku and the Androids from interfering. As the four Pride Troopers beat Caulifla, Kale's self-hatred causes her to transform into a regular Super Saiyan, breaking free of her prison before she in Super Saiyan Berserker and Caulifla in Super Saiyan 2 use a combination attack to blast Kahseral, Zoire, and Kettle out of the ring. Cocotte seals herself in a mini-dimension to avoid the blast, only to be thrown out of the ring instead by Android 18. Goku allows Caulifla and Kale to leave so he can fight them after they get stronger, though he and the Androids are unaware that Brianne de Chateau is observing them.
102	26	"The Power of Love Explodes?! Universe 2's Little Witch Warriors!!" / "The Power of Love Explodes? The 2nd Universe's Witchy Warriors!"; Transliteration: "Ai no chikara ga dai bakuhatsu!? dai ni uchu majo-kko senshi!!" (Japanese: 愛の力が大爆発！？ 第2宇宙の魔女っ子戦士！！)	Masato Mitsuka	Atsuhiro Tomioka	August 6, 2017	March 16, 2019
Brianne de Chateau and her teammates Sanka Coo (サンカ・クー, Sanka Kū) and Sous Roas (スー・ロース, Sū Rōsu) announce themselves to the other fighters and begin to transform into their magical girl alter egos. Android 17 blasts them before they can transform, but Brianne de Chateau, Goku, and Top berate him for his dishonorable tactics and browbeat him into allowing them to transform, much to Beerus' dismay. They assume their alter egos Ribrianne, Kakunsa (カクンサ, Kakunsa), and Roasie (ロージィ, Rōjī) and barrage the arena with a powerful love based attack that brainwashes some of the fighters with the Seventh Universe fighters unaffected due to their mental discipline. Gohan's group elects to split up and fight independently. Vegeta attacks Ribrianne, who counters with a rolling attack that knocks out the Tenth Universe's Dyrasem (ジラセン, Jirasen). Roasie attacks Goku with a flurry of blows that grows more powerful the longer she keeps it up, while Kakunsa battles Android 17 with her animalistic fighting style. Android 17 baits her into overextending herself and stuns her with a barrier before he attempts to knock her out of the stage, only for her teammate Bikal (ビカル, Bikaru) to rescue her. Android 17 decides to stop holding back and swiftly eliminates both Second Universe fighters, his actions infuriating Ribrianne as she powers up to fight him.
103	27	"Gohan, Show No Mercy! Showdown With Universe 10!!" / "Gohan, Get Ruthless! Showdown with the 10th Universe!"; Transliteration: "Gohan yo hijōnare! Dai ju uchu to no kessen!!" (Japanese: 悟飯よ非情なれ！第10宇宙との決戦!!)	Hideki Hiroshima	Yoshifumi Fukushima	August 13, 2017	March 23, 2019
Ribrianne and Android 17 fiercely attack each other, while Roasie overwhelms Goku's defenses before her attempt to blow him up is stopped by Android 17 protecting him with a barrier. Goku, who has studied Roasie's techniques, hits her with a powerful ki blast. Goku and Android 17 corner Roasie and Ribrianne before they are spirited off by Jimizu via his instant transmission. Elsewhere, Botamo act on Champa's orders to attack Gohan, whose flurry of blows seemed to have no effect on Botamo. However, Gohan's attacks begin to lift Botamo off the ground and renders him unable to defend himself, which allows Gohan to knock him off the stage. The Tenth Universe's Obni (オブニ, Obuni) and Rubalt (ルバルト, Rubaruto) appear to challenge Gohan and Piccolo while their teammate Zircor (ジルコル, Jirukoru) is eliminated by Jimizu. With eight warriors eliminated, Gowasu accepts his imminent demise, while Rumush remains defiant. Obni shifts his ki away from his body to render himself undetectable and wounds Gohan. Piccolo is initially overwhelmed by Rubalt until he uses his Hellzone Grenade to eliminate him with only Obni left to represent the Tenth Universe. Obni begins to overwhelm Gohan, which makes Gowasu want to cling to life again. Gohan powers up and powers through one of Obni's punches. He counterattacks Obni's moves by locating and hitting Obni after he gets hit. Obni pauses the fight to show his respect for Gohan yet adamant to not lose for his universe's sake. Gohan battles and defeats Obni with a Kamehameha. As the Zenos erase the Tenth Universe representatives, Gohan discovers a locket containing a picture of Obni with his family and mourns the Tenth Universe's erasure alongside the Tenth Universe Angel Kusu (クス, Kusu).
104	28	"The Ultimate High Speed Battle Begins! Goku and Hit Join Forces!!" / "A Transcendent Light-Speed Battle Erupts! Goku and Hit's United Front!"; Transliteration: "Chōzetsu kōsoku batoru boppatsu! Gokū to hitto no kyōdō sensen!!" (Japanese: 超絶光速バトル勃発! 悟空とヒットの共同戦線!!)	Takao Iwai	Toshio Yoshitaka	August 20, 2017	March 30, 2019
Dyspo challenges Hit and uses his incredible speed to overwhelm Hit's Time Skip. Everyone quickly deduces that Dyspo is listening for the sound of Hit's body tensing up to determine when he is about to attempt to use Time Skip. Hit resorts to fighting him conventionally, but he is pushed to the edge of the stage. Top deduces that Hit has adjusted to Dyspo's fighting style and is luring him into a trap and sends his fellow Pride Trooper K'nsi (クンシー, Kunshī) to back Dyspo up. K'nsi uses his energy ropes to save Dyspo as he lost his footing when Hit turned intangible. Dyspo and K'nsi launch a renewed assault against Hit and drive him into a corner before Goku intervenes. Goku uses his Super Saiyan God form to counter Dyspo's speed, while Hit uses his assassination technique to injure K'nsi. Goku and Hit switch places. Hit uses a fake Time Skip to throw Dyspo off and wound him, while Goku overwhelms K'nsi with his Super Saiyan Blue form. Hit attempts to eliminate Dyspo, but K'nsi rescues him again. K'nsi charges Hit, who turns intangible and knocks him off the stage. Dyspo retreats and regroups with his allies. Top abandons all notions of justice and decides to focus on survival. Hit decides not to battle Goku as thanks for lending a hand. Hit and Goku vow to settle things if they both make it to the end of the Tournament of Power.
105	29	"A Desperate Battle! Master Roshi's Sacrifice!!" / "A Valiant Fight! Master Roshi's Blaze of Glory!"; Transliteration: "Funsen! Mutenroshi inochi o Moyasu!!" (Japanese: 奮戦！ 武天老師命を燃やす！！)	Masanori Satō	King Ryū	August 27, 2017	April 6, 2019
Master Roshi quietly observes the battles from afar. He is confronted and seduced by the Fourth Universe fighter Caway (キャウェイ, Kyauei). Master Roshi snaps back to his senses in time. Master Roshi destroys her energy weapon, powers up, and drives her to jump off the stage. Master Roshi is next challenged by Caway's teammate Dercori (ダーコリ, Dākori), who uses her talismans to confound Master Roshi with illusions and trap him in a single spot before using his Evil Containment Wave to seal her in a small bottle and toss it off the ring. Quitela and Beerus get into an argument about the legality of the move. The Present Grand Zenō and Future Grand Zenō rule in Master Roshi's favor. Ganos, who is enraged at Master Roshi for eliminating his friends, challenges him and powers up into an avian form. Initially, Master Roshi is able to use his experience to predict, evade, and counter Ganos' attacks. However, Ganos is able to grow more powerful the longer a fight drags on. He rallies and delivers a fierce series of blows to Master Roshi. Master Roshi attempts to hypnotize Ganos into falling asleep, but he attacks himself to wake himself up. Ganos demands that Master Roshi accept his limits and give up, but Master Roshi refuses. Master Roshi unleashes a Max Power Kamehameha that defeats Ganos. But the effort is too much for Master Roshi's body to handle as he collapses, Goku managing to defibrillates him with his ki before escorting his mentor to safety.
106	30	"Find Him! Death Match With An Invisible Attacker!!" / "Find them Out! Deathmatch with a Furtive Attacker!" ("Find them Out! Battle with a Furtive Attacker!"); Transliteration: "Mikiwamero! Sugata naki atakkā to no shitō!!" (Japanese: 見極めろ！ 姿なきアタッカーとの死闘!!)	Takahiro Imamura	Hiroshi Yamaguchi	September 3, 2017	April 13, 2019
Goku brings Master Roshi to an isolated part of the stage and leaves him to recuperate at his request. Gohan and Piccolo are confronted by the Sixth Universe's Dr. Rota (Dr.ロタ, Dokutā Rota) before he was taken down by a sniper before he can reveal his ability. Gohan and Piccolo are unable to find the location of the sniper until they find a red orb on the ground. It is revealed that the sniper, the Second Universe's Prum (プラン, Puran), can see through these orbs. The lasers ricochet off of the orbs so that his true location is a secret. Piccolo tries to create a smokescreen in order to blur the vision, but Prum can still see them via their heat signatures. Prum shoots Piccolo and destroys both of his arms, which forces him to painfully regenerate them. Gohan and Piccolo realize that the orbs depend on heat signatures and blast the surrounding area to create multiple heat signatures. Prum responds by coming out of his hiding spot and blasting the entire area. Gohan and Piccolo are forced into hiding. Tien analyzes Dr. Rota and deduces that he was hit by a sniper as Goku and Vegeta arrive. Vegeta berates Tien, who warns them about Prum, but Vegeta arrogantly brushes it off until he is almost incapacitated by one of Prum's blasts. As Goku and Tien observe Prum, they deduce that there is another shooter from behind as Prum is merely reflecting the blasts. Vegeta and Goku go after Prum, while Tien goes to save Gohan and Piccolo. Goku and Vegeta try to attack Prum, but their ki blasts are reflected off of his body. Tien navigates through the field of blasts and confronts the true sniper, Prum's teammate Harmira (ハーミラ, Hāmira). Realizing that Prum can deflect ki blasts and not physical attacks, Vegeta and Goku throw giant boulders at him. Tien uses his multi-form technique in order to buy himself time against Harmira, but three of his clones are shot down. The fourth and final Tien defeats Harmira. Just as Tien is about to eliminate him, Harmira shoots the ground underneath Tien's feet and knocks him off the stage. However, Tien's other three clones come back and drag Harmira down with them. Tien and Harmira are eliminated from the Tournament of Power. Although Beerus praises Tien for forcing the battle into a draw, Tien is noticeably upset about being defeated. As Prum is confronted by Vegeta, Dr. Rota comes back and attacks Prum as revenge for shooting him. Shortly afterwards, Vegeta eliminates Prum and Dr. Rota from the Tournament of Power with a Galick Gun.
107	31	"Revenge "F" The Cunning Trap?!" / "Revenge "F"! A Cunning Trap is Set?"; Transliteration: "Fukushū no Efu! Shikakerareta Kōkatsu na Wana!?" (Japanese: 復讐の「F」！ しかけられた狡猾な罠！？)	Ryōta Nakamura	Toshio Yoshitaka	September 17, 2017	April 20, 2019
As the Third Universe's Maji Kayo (マジ = カーヨ, Maji-Kāyo) is effortlessly defeated by Jiren while confronting him and the remaining Pride Troopers, Frost recalls convincing Champa to pardon him if he defeats the Seventh Universe in a humiliating matter. Frost targets Master Roshi with Ribrianne preventing Goku's interference, with Roshi making a failed attempt to seal the villain with his Evil Containment Wave. Vegeta intervenes, only for Frost to get added muscle in Auta Magetta whose ears are covered. Frost goads Roshi into attempting another Evil Containment Wave on Auta Magetta despite the risk of killing himself, with Frost redirecting the attack on Vegeta and seals him the bottle Roshi used in his previous attempt. But Roshi, after being heavily wounded by Frost, manages to use the last of his strength to destroy the bottle and free Vegeta. Vegeta immediately turns Super Saiyan Blue to disable Auta Magetta while Frost flees. Vegeta knocks Auta Magetta off the stage with Roshi jumping after to can receive a Senzu Bean. Beerus admits that Roshi has earned his respect.
108	32	"Frieza and Frost! Conjoined Malice?!" / "Frieza and Frost! A Mutual Malevolence?"; Transliteration: "Furīza to Furosuto! Majiwaru Akui!?" (Japanese: フリーザとフロスト！交わる悪意！？)	Hideki Hiroshima	Yoshifumi Fukushima	September 24, 2017	April 27, 2019
As Goku battles Ribrianne, the deities of the top four universes speculate on who will win the tournament. Meanwhile, Gohan is confronted by Jimizu and is overwhelmed by the Yardrat's Instant Transmission technique before Frieza intervenes. The Seventh Universe group speculate Frieza may intend to betray them so he can obtain the Super Dragon Balls for his own ends while allowing Jimizu to resume his attack on Gohan. But Frieza again intervenes on a whim to save Gohan and provokes Jimizu into attacking him, swiftly eliminating the Yardrat in an antagonizing manner. Frost then appears with Frieza confessing that they formed an alliance before attacking Gohan before knowing him out in his True Golden form. Frieza then teaches Frost how to enter the 100% Power state, only to eliminate him in a surprise double-cross. Gohan admits that he immediately figured out Frieza's plan and played along with him. An enraged Frost attempts to attack Frieza from the spectator stands, only to be erased by the present Zeno for acting against the rules. While the Zenos leave the Sixth Universe representatives with a warning to follow the rules or face instant erasure, Goku continues battling Ribrianne.
109	33	"The Ultimate Enemy Approaches Goku! Now, Let Loose! The Killer Spirit Bomb!!" / "The Mightiest Enemy Zeroes in on Goku! Launch the Knockout Spirit Bomb Now!"; Transliteration: "Goku ni Semaru Saikyo no Teki! Ima Koso Hanate! Hisassu no Genki-Dama!!" (Japanese: 悟空に迫る最強の敵！今こそ放て！必殺の元気玉！！)	Kazuya Karasawa	Hiroshi Yamaguchi	October 8, 2017 (Note: Episodes 109 and 110 aired together as a 1-hour television special.)	May 4, 2019
Ribrianne declares her intention of using the Super Dragon Balls to a universal love deity, Goku admitting he never thought on what wish for as he considers using benefiting his family or meeting a strong opponent. Ribrianne absorbs the teammates' love energy to become Super Ribrianne to attack, only to be knocked back to her form by Super Saiyan Blue Goku. As Ribrianne takes over after landing near Jiren, the Pride receives a telepathic massage from the Eleventh Universe's Destroyer Belmod (ベルモッド, Berumoddo) to defeat Goku as to demoralize the other universes. After Jiren overpowered him while he powered up to Super Saiyan Blue Kaio-ken x20, Goku is allowed by his opponent to use his Spirit Bomb, Vegeta thwarting Ribrianne's sneak attack while the other Seventh Universe teammates except Vegeta lending Goku their power. Goku completes the Spirit Bomb and throws it, but Jiren easily deflects it with just one hand. Goku and Jiren engage in a struggle to take control of the Spirit Bomb, initially a stalemate until Jiren begins overwhelming Goku with his own attack.
110	34	"Son Goku Wakes! New Level of the Awakened!!" / "Goku Enkindled! The Awakened One's New Ultra Instinct!"; Transliteration: "Son Gokū kakusei! Mezameshi mono no aratanaru gokui!!" (Japanese: 孫悟空覚醒！目覚めし者の新たなる極意！！)	Masato Mitsuka	Atsuhiro Tomioka	October 8, 2017	May 11, 2019
Goku powers up even more and pushes the Spirit Bomb back towards Jiren before he repels it with a glare, Whis assuming him to be the rumored figure in the Eleventh Universe whose power surpasses Belmod. The continued stalemate eventually causes the Spirit Bomb to collapse into a small black hole, sucking in Goku before it explodes. With Goku assumed dead, the Grand Minister rules Jiren not to be subjected to disqualification since Goku was killed by his own attack. The Zenos prepare to eliminate Goku before suddenly rematerializes, having reached a new level of power as he is able to go toe-to-toe with Jiren. Whis realizes that Goku accidentally achieved the legendary deity transformation of gods called Ultra Instinct -Sign- (身み勝がっ手ての極ごく意い"兆きざし", Migatte no Goku'i "Kizashi", lit. "Secret of selfishness "Omen""), theorizing it to have occurred when Goku broke through his limits while being revitalized from being exposed to the Spirit Bomb's explosion. Goku fights Jiren on equal footing before his newfound power wears off. Jiren knocks Goku away, with Hit attempting to take advantage of the opportunity and attacks Jiren. After Vegeta demands to know what happened before facing Ribrianne, Goku teleports to a safe location where Frieza corners him.
111	35	"The Surreal Supreme Battle! Hit vs Jiren!!" / "An Extra-Dimensional Ultimate Battle! Hit vs. Jiren!"; Transliteration: "I jigen no kyokuchi batoru! Hitto basasu Jiren!!" (Japanese: 異次元の極致バトル! ヒットVSジレン!!)	Toshiaki Komura	Atsuhiro Tomioka	October 15, 2017	May 18, 2019
Given the impression that he intends to kill Goku as he explains they are in a blind spot, Frieza instead transfers from his energy into Goku to heal him as his way of repaying Goku's act of mercy during their fight on Planet Namek. Goku later observes Hit's battle against Jiren, only to be ambushed by the Sixth Universe Namekians Saonel (サオネル, Saoneru) and Pilina (ピリナ, Pirina) before the duo are confronted by Gohan and Piccolo. Elsewhere, Vegeta overpowers Ribrianne before Roasie interferes and duo fall back with the latter restoring Ribrianne's morale. Meanwhile, purposely using his time-skip powers against Jiren, Hit execute a gambit to freeze Jiren so Cabba, Caulifla, and Kale to keep fighting. But Jiren eventually breaks free and eliminates Hit. As the Tournament of Power reaches its midway point, Jiren begins meditating while leaving Top and Dyspo to deal with the other fighters. Biarra (ビアラ, Biara) and Catopesra (カトペスラ, Katopesura) of the Third Universe find out the hard way that they cannot penetrate Jiren's barrier to hit him.
112	36	"A Saiyan's Vow! Vegeta's Resolution!!" / "A Saiyan Oath! Vegeta's Resolve!"; Transliteration: "Saiya-jin no chikai! Bejīta no kakugo!!" (Japanese: サイヤ人の誓い！ ベジータの覚悟！！)	Takao Iwai	Toshio Yoshitaka	October 22, 2017	May 25, 2019
Determined to continue fighting despite not fully recovered, Goku finds himself attacked by Koitsukai (コイツカイ, Koitsukai), Pancéa (パンチア, Panchia), and Borareta (ボラレータ, Borarēta) of the Third Universe while Gohan and Piccolo are still fighting Saonel and Pilina. Caulifla and Kale are discussing the battle between Goku and Jiren. Caulifla and Kale are confronted by the Fourth Universe warrior Monna (モンナ, Monna), with Cabba sacrificing himself to holding her so the girls can fall back due to being Sixth Universe's remaining aces. Cabba is save from being thrown out by Vegeta, reminding the young Sayian of his promise from their previous match of taking him to Planet Sadala while revealing his intent of using the Super Dragon Balls to restore the Sixth Universe. A newly inspired Cabba achieves Super Sayian 2 and eliminates Monna, only to quickly eliminated by Frieza who seeks to subvert the deities. Meanwhile, Vegeta ends up battling Top and he meets up with Goku, who is still having difficulty with his three opponents. However, Caulifla intervenes and knocks the robots away, powering up to Super Saiyan 2 to challenge Goku herself.
113	37	"With Great Joy! The Repeat Battle-Crazy Saiyan Fight!!" / "With Great Joy! The Fighting Freak Saiyans' Battle Rejoined!"; Transliteration: "Kiki to Shite! Sentō-kyō Saiya-jin Batoru Futatabi!!" (Japanese: 嬉々として! 戦闘狂サイヤ人バトル再び!!)	Hideki Hiroshima	Yoshifumi Fukushima	October 29, 2017	June 1, 2019
With Hit and Cabba on her mind, Caulifla demands Goku to fight her so she can learn to enter Super Saiyan 3 so that she can win the Tournament of Power. Goku accepts, explaining to be patient as he gradually regains his strength while using his martial arts to have an advantage against her brawler fighting-style despite her being Super Saiyan 2. But Goku manages to enter Super Sayian 2 form after she adapts to his moves, Whis noting that the fight is bringing out her untapped potential as she and Goku are evenly matched. But Goku calls in Kale to join the fight, holding himself against the female Sayians until they start to match him with their teamwork. They land a massive combined attack on him, but Goku finally powers up to Super Saiyan 3 long enough to easily deflect their attacks. Caulifla is satisfied despite Goku being forced back into his Super Saiyan 2 form, adamant to reach that level of power while Kale's desire to get stronger as well inadvertently causes her to transform into her Super Saiyan Berserker form once again.
114	38	"Intimidating Passion! The Birth of a New Super Warrior!!" / "Bloodcurdling! The Explosive Birth of a New Super Warrior!" ("Spinetingling! The Explosive of a New Super Warrior!"); Transliteration: "Kiki semaru! Aratana chō sen-shi no bakutan!!" (Japanese: 鬼気せまる! 新たな超戦士の爆誕!!)	Masanori Satō	Hiroshi Yamaguchi	November 5, 2017	June 8, 2019
Vegeta continues his battle with Top, while Caulifla is able to help Kale come to her senses from the Berserker state and transform into Super Saiyan 2 before the two double-team Goku. Goku is eventually knocked into Frieza's fight with Catopesra, with Frieza deciding to observe the fight after Goku tells him not to attack Caulifla and Kale. He wants to pull out all the stops against Caulifla and Kale, plain and simple. Caulifla and Kale hold hands. After unsuccessfully attempting to use Instant Transmission as a strategy, Goku powers up to his Super Saiyan God form and easily overpowers Caulifla and Kale. As Goku prepares to eliminate Caulifla and Kale using a powerful Kamehameha to destroy the area of the stage they are on. But it was revealed that Champa gave Caulifla and Kale a pair of Potara earrings provided by the Sixth Universe's Supreme Kai Fuwa (フワ, Fuwa) as a last resort, using them to fuse into a single being of immense power named Kefla (ケフラ, Kefura) who proceeds to attack Goku.
115	39	"Goku VS Kefla! Super Saiyan Blue Defeated!?" / "Goku vs. Kefla! Super Saiyan Blue Beaten?!"; Transliteration: "Gokū vāsasu Kefura! Sūpāsaiya-jin Burū Yabureru!?" (Japanese: 悟空VSケフラ! 超サイヤ人ブルー敗れる!?)	Takahiro Imamura	Toshio Yoshitaka	November 12, 2017	June 15, 2019
As Vegeta continues fighting Top, Gohan and Piccolo are still fighting Saonel and Pilina while Android 17 saves Android 18 from Catopesra. Goku continues his fight with Kefla with the Zenos approving use of the Potara earrings, most of other universes deciding against using Potara fusion due to the numbers disadvantage. The Second Universe's Supreme Kai Pell (ペル, Peru) gives his Potara earrings to Rabanra (ラバンラ, Rabanra) and Zarbuto (ザーブト, Zābuto), only for the two to be caught in the path of Goku and Kefla's fight with the earrings destroyed in the process. Kefla gains the upper hand, assuming Super Sayian form while Goku powers up to Super Saiyan Blue and attempting to turn the tables with Kaio-ken. He appears to be winning, but Kefla lands a sneak attack that knocks him out of Super Saiyan Blue Kaio-ken. Kefla prepares to eliminate Goku, but Goku unexpectedly reawakens Ultra Instinct -Sign- again to easily dodge Kefla's attacks.
116	40	"The Sign of a Comeback! Ultra Instinct's Huge Explosion!!" / "Signs of a Turnabout! The Autonomous Ultra Instinct Erupts!"; Transliteration: "Gyakuten no kizashi! Migatte no gokui ga dai bakuhatsu!!" (Japanese: 逆転の兆し！ 身勝手の極意が大爆発！！)	Makoto Sonoda	Atsuhiro Tomioka	November 19, 2017	June 22, 2019
After Goku enters his Ultra Instinct -Sign- in response to her power, Kefla responds by powering up to Super Saiyan 2 but is unable land a hit on Goku while her attacks are not strong enough to take him down. As Jiren awakens from his mediation and rejoins Top and Dyspo, Whis explains that Goku's consciously attacking prevents him from using Ultra Instinct -Sign- to its full potential. Vegeta realizes that Ultra Instinct -Sign- was the lesson Whis was teaching him and Goku, determined to master it as well. Goku realizes that he is running low on stamina, deciding to quickly end the fight as he uses Ultra Instinct -Sign- to dodge Kefla's barrage of energy attacks while charging up a Kamehameha. Despite Kefla's attempt to take him after he jumped midair, Goku uses the charged up energy to slide over Kefla's attack to launch a point-blank Kamehameha that blasts her off the field. Kefla is eliminated and split back to Caulifla and Kale while their Potara earrings shatter, leaving Saonel and Pilina as the remaining Sixth universe representatives. Note: This Japanese airing of the episode was dedicated in memory of Hiromi Tsuru, who died on November 16, 2017.
117	41	"Showdown of Love! Androids VS Universe 2!!" / "Showdown of Love! The Androids vs the 2nd Universe!"; Transliteration: "Ai no daikessen! Jinzōningen VS Dai ni uchū!!" (Japanese: 愛の大決戦！人造人間VS第2宇宙！！)	Kazuya Karasawa	Yoshifumi Fukushima	November 26, 2017	June 29, 2019
Goku is left exhausted from his battle with Kefla as the Second Universe's five remaining warriors decide to attack him as Saonel and Pilina prevent Gohan and Piccolo from interfering, Vegeta overpowering Catopesra after a failed attempt to unlock his own Ultra Instinct -Sign-. Ribrianne and Roasie launch a combined attack at Goku which is deflected by the Androids, with Android 17 facing Roasie while Android 18 battles Ribrianne who refuses to acknowledge her after learning Krillin is her husband. After the Androids execute a strategy to remove Roasie, Ribrianne reverts to Brianne de Chateau before managing to trap Android 18 while using her comrades' love to transform into a giant manifestation of her Super Ribrianne form. Android 18 almost gives up until her love for Krillin and Marron gives her the determination to break free of Super Ribrianne's trap. With Android 17's help, Android 18 blasts through Super Ribrianne's giant form and eliminates her. Brianne realizes that she lost because of Android 18's strong love for Krillin. Goku faces off against the remaining Second Universe warriors Zirloin (ザーロイン, Zāroin), Zarbuto (ザーブト, Zābuto), and Rabanra (ラバンラ, Rabanra).
118	42	"Accelerated Tragedy – Vanishing Universes..." / "Accelerating Tragedy – Vanishing Universes"; Transliteration: "Kasokusuru Higeki Kieyuku Uchū..." (Japanese: 加速する悲劇消えゆく宇宙...)	Masato Mitsuka	Hiroshi Yamaguchi	December 3, 2017	July 6, 2019
Gohan and Piccolo learn that Saonel and Pilina are stronger that they appear as they reveal to have absorbed their kin prior to the Tournament of Power, with Gohan seeing this as an excuse to utilize lethal force without fear of disqualification due to their opponents' enhanced durability. As Goku and the Androids battle Zirloin, Zarbuto, and Rabanra, it is revealed that the Second Universe's Angel Sour (サワア, Sawā) had been broadcasting the Tournament of Power to the Second Universe populace. Brianne encourages her people into channeling their love to Zirloin, Zarbuto, and Rabanra, causing them to transform them into forms similar to the Maidens and as execute their universe's legendary technique Pretty Black Hole to immobilize Goku and the Androids as attack sinks through the tournament stage. But Goku powers up to Super Saiyan Blue and breaks through the Pretty Black Hole with a Kamehameha that eliminates the Second Universe fighters while Gohan and Piccolo blast Saonel and Pilina off the tournament stage with a powerful combo attack by Gohan's Kamehameha and Piccolo's Special Beam Cannon. With all of their fighters eliminated, both the Second and Sixth Universes are erased with Brianne leading her team in a final happy moment before they erased. While Beerus remains impassive over his twin brother's erasure, Cabba's erased wishes good luck to Vegeta who places in a bad mood as his fight with Catopesra continues.
119	43	"Unavoidable?! The Fierce Stealth Attack!!" / "Unavoidable? The Ferocity of a Stealth Attack!"; Transliteration: "Kaihi funō!? Suterusu kōgeki no mōi!!" (Japanese: 回避不能!? ステルス攻撃の猛威!!)	Toshiaki Komura	Ayumu Hisao	December 10, 2017	July 13, 2019
Even after Catopesra enters his ultimate mode, he barely keeps himself from being knocked off the field by Vegeta before something pushes him off. The same entity nearly does the same to Vegeta and Gohan, with Piccolo saving the latter, revealed to be an invisible fighter while attacking Android 18. The fighter is revealed to be one of the two missing Fourth Universe fighters Gamisalas (ガミサラス, Gamisarasu), who Piccolo quickly eliminates once Gohan creates a dust cloud to expose him. Undaunted, Quitela orders his remaining fighters to step up their game, Xiangca (シャンツァ, Shantsa) generating a dome that envelops the Seventh Universe team and manifests illusions of the erased universes' defeated fighters which Damom (ダモン, Damon) uses to attack through. With Seventh Universe team assuming Damom to also be invisible, Piccolo eliminates Xiangca upon seeking him but gets eliminated by Damom after his attacks failed to hit him. Android 17 eventually realizes that Damom is a fast-moving insect alien to explain how none of his team could hit him, solving the issue by having Goku repeatedly punch the tournament stage so the resulting shock waves would launch Damom into the air. Android 17 then traps Damom in a miniature force field which he kicks off the tournament stage with the Fourth Universe removed from play. With all of their fighters eliminated, an desperate Quitela tries to erase everyone before the Fourth Universe is promptly erased.
120	44	"The Perfect Survival Tactic! Universe 3's Menacing Assassin!!" / "A Perfect Survival Strategy! The 3rd Universe's Menacing Assassin!" ("A Perfect Survival Strategy! The 3rd Universe's Menacing Enforcer!"); Transliteration: "Kanpeki naru Seizon Senryaku! Dai san Uchū Kyōi no Shikaku!!" (Japanese: 完璧なる生存戦略! 第3宇宙脅威の刺客!!)	Hideki Hiroshima	Ken'ichi Yamashita	December 17, 2017	July 20, 2019
Following the Fourth Universe's elimination, the Third Universe's remaining fighters commence their offensive against the Seventh Universe team as Dr. Paparoni (パパロニ, Paparoni) sends Pancéa, Koitsukai, Borareta, and Biarra to attack the Saiyans. But the Androids intervene and deal with Biarra while Gohan faces the other robots so Goku and Vegeta can save their energy for the Eleventh Universe fighters. But when Biarra is eliminated, Paparoni receives orders from his universe's deities Supreme Kai Eyre and Destroyer Mule to have Pancéa, Koitsukai, and Borareta combine into stronger robot called Koiceareta (コイチアレータ, Koichiarēta). Koiceareta overpowers Gohan until Goku and Vegeta step in, distracting the robot while Gohan charges and strikes with an attack powerful enough to defeat it. With Koiceareta defeated, Paparoni refuses to surrender while declaring to unleash his universe's ultimate secret technique.
121	45	"All-Out War! The Ultimate Quadruple Merge vs Universe 7's Full-Scale Attack!!" / "All-Out War! The Ultimate Four-Fold Union vs. the 7th Universe's Total Offensive!"; Transliteration: "Sōryokusen! Kyūkoku no Yontai Gattai VS Dai nana Uchū Sōkōgeki!!" (Japanese: 総力戦！究極の4体合体VS第7宇宙総攻撃！！)	Takao Iwai	Toshio Yoshitaka	December 24, 2017	July 27, 2019
Paparoni merges with Koiceareta to transform into the gigantic monster Agnilasa (アニラーザ, Anirāza), the Third Universe's most powerful warrior, overwhelming the Sayians and Androids by using echolocation to detect their movements and counter their coordinated attacks. Agnilasa nearly eliminates Goku with teleported punches when Frieza intervenes and knocks him back into the tournament stage, with Goku saving Android 18 when Agnilasa attempts to eat her while Frieza is forced to join the fray. After Android 18 sacrifices herself to keep her twin brother from being eliminated, the remaining Seventh Universe fighters power up to their maximum levels and distract Agnilasa in a clash of attack long enough for Android 17 to pierce through Agnilasa's attack and damage his energy reactor. This enables the team to eliminate Agnilasa, reverted to his components with Eyre and Mule accepting the Third Universe's erasure with grace. The Seventh Universe's victory is short-lived when the remaining Eleventh Universe fighters step forward to challenge them. Only two universes remain with eight fighters: the Seventh Universe's Goku, Vegeta, Gohan, Android 17 and Frieza, and the Eleventh Universe's Jiren, Top and Dyspo.
122	46	"For One's Own Pride! Vegeta's Challenge to Be The Strongest!!" / "With His Pride on the Line! Vegeta's Challenge to Be the Strongest!"; Transliteration: "Onore no Hokori wo Kakete! Bejīta Saikyō he no Chōsen!!" (Japanese: 己の誇りをかけて！ベジータ最強への挑戦！！)	Takahiro Imamura	Atsuhiro Tomioka	January 7, 2018	August 3, 2019
With only two universes remaining, the Grand Minister compresses the bleachers so that the remaining spectators can be close together. The final warriors begin their final battle with Gohan and Android 17 against Top while Frieza battles Dyspo. Goku and Vegeta battle Jiren, who overwhelms the former with his punching barrage while Vegeta is able to dodge from analyzing Jiren's fighting pattern. He lands a solid blow to Jiren's midsection, but Jiren counters with a powerful blast that nearly knocks Vegeta off the tournament stage. Meanwhile, Frieza blocks one of Dyspo's attacks with his tail, but Dyspo uses it as leverage to injure him. Jiren disparages Vegeta for his self-righteousness, but Vegeta declares that his pride is the source of his strength. Vegeta powers up a Final Flash and goads Jiren into taking it head-on. But the attack fails to damage Jiren, who acknowledge Vegeta's strength before incapacitating him with an energy blast.
123	47	"Body and Soul, Full Power Release! Goku and Vegeta!!" / "Body, Soul and Power Unleashed! Goku and Vegeta!"; Transliteration: "Zenshin Zenrei Zenryoku Kaihō! Gokū to Bejīta!!" (Japanese: 全身全霊全力解放！悟空とベジータ！！)	Masanori Satō	Atsuhiro Tomioka	January 14, 2018	August 10, 2019
With Vegeta down, Goku faces off against Jiren. Meanwhile, Frieza begins fighting Dyspo seriously, while Gohan and Android 17 are outmatched against Top. Outmatched in power, Goku instead uses controlled ki blasts to create a minefield around Jiren, but it has no effect on him. Goku lures Jiren onto a large rock that extends out over the edge of the fighting stage and cuts through the rock with a Destructo Disc. This causes Jiren to fall, but Jiren is able to jump off the falling debris and flies back onto the fighting stage. Angered by his near-elimination, Jiren finally unleashes a fraction of his real power and easily overwhelms Goku with a volley of punches. The force from Jiren's volley of punches forms an energized punch that reverts Goku into his base state. Goku and Vegeta both get back up and power up to Super Saiyan Blue. Goku uses his Kaio-ken beyond his previous limitations in into the Super Saiyan Blue Maximum Kaio-ken. Vegeta is able to surpass his limits by tapping into more ki in his body. Vegeta attains a transformation similar to the Ascended Super Saiyan form known as the Super Saiyan Blue Evolution. Fully powered up his maximums, Goku and Vegeta attack Jiren as a team and catch him off guard with their uncoordinated attacks.
124	48	"The Fiercely Overwhelming Assault! Gohan's Last Stand!!" / "A Storm-and-Stress Assault! Gohan's Last Stand!" ("A Storm-and-Stress Attack! Gohan's Last Stand!"); Transliteration: "Shippū-Dotō no Mōshū! Gohan Haisui no Jin!!" (Japanese: 疾風怒涛の猛襲！悟飯背水の陣!!)	Hideki Hiroshima	Yoshifumi Fukushima	January 21, 2018	August 17, 2019
As Goku and Vegeta continue fighting Jiren, Frieza breaks off his fight with Dyspo long enough to offer his services to the Eleventh Universe in return that they resurrect him with the Super Dragon Balls. When Dyspo refuses the offer, Frieza powers up to his True Golden form and gains the advantage in the fight. Dyspo reveals his own ultimate technique known as the Super Maximum Light Speed Mode, which increases his power and speed even further, overwhelming Frieza enough that Gohan comes to his aid. Gohan and Frieza take on Dyspo as a team, but they have little success. Gohan develops a strategy that has Frieza use his energy to form a cage around Dyspo, which prevents him from using his high-speed attacks and allows Gohan to gain the upper hand. Unfortunately, Frieza runs out of energy. The cage dissolves before Gohan can land the finishing blow. But Gohan is able to grab Dyspo and holds long enough for Frieza to blast them off the ring, with one fighter from the remaining teams eliminated.
125	49	"With Imposing Presence! God of Destruction Toppo Descends!!" / "A Commanding Presence! The Advent of Top the Destroyer!"; Transliteration: "Ifu-Dōdō! Hakaishin Toppo Kōrin!" (Japanese: 威風堂々! 破壊神トッポ降臨！！)	Kazuya Karasawa	Hiroshi Yamaguchi	January 28, 2018	August 24, 2019
Goku and Vegeta continue their battle with Jiren, while Android 17 manages to defeat Top with Frieza's help. But Top gets back up and powers up while exhibiting the same type of energy a Destroyer possesses. Belmod reveals that Top is a candidate to succeed him as the next Destroyer of the Eleventh Universe. Top unleashes his new power, which damages the fighting stage and breaks a large portion of it. Android 17 and Frieza attack Top repeatedly, but are outmatched while managing to keep themselves from being eliminated, though Top knocks out Frieza before engaging in another beam clash with Android 17.
126	50	"Surpass Even a God! Vegeta's Desperate Blow!!" / "Surpass Even a God! Vegeta's Sacrifice Strike!"; Transliteration: "Kami wo mo Koero! Bejīta Sutemi no Ichigeki!!" (Japanese: 神をも超えろ！ベジータ捨て身の一撃！！)	Takao Iwai	Ayumu Hisao	February 4, 2018	August 31, 2019
Top easily overpowers Android 17's blast. Android 17 is able to evade him for a while by using the broken fighting stage to his advantage, but Top effortlessly withstands Android 17's attacks. Top prepares to eliminate Android 17 with a giant energy blast, but Frieza rejoins the battle and deflects Top's attack. Frieza uses his own energy attack to immobilize Top, which allows him and Android 17 to land numerous attacks, but none of them have any effect. Top is about to eliminate them both, when he is interrupted by Goku and Vegeta, who are still fighting Jiren. Frieza and Android 17 are hit by one of Jiren's attacks, which gives Top the opportunity to attack Vegeta instead. Top overwhelms Vegeta with his new power and states that he has cast aside everything else in order to become strong enough to win the Tournament of Power. However, Vegeta is inspired by his family, his promise to Cabba, and his Saiyan pride. Vegeta refuses to cast anything aside. Vegeta unleashes his full power and overwhelms Top. Vegeta and Top both use their ultimate attacks. Top unleashes his Energy of Destruction, while Vegeta uses the Final Explosion technique that he used against Majin Buu. Vegeta's attack overwhelms Top's attack. Vegeta blasts Top out of the fighting stage and eliminates him from the Tournament of Power. This also causes even more damage to the fighting stage. Due to Vegeta being much stronger than he was the last time he used the Final Explosion technique, he survives the blast. Vegeta's energy is almost completely drained. Android 17 also reappears, but he has been injured by Jiren's attack. Goku, Vegeta, and Android 17 all face off against Jiren, who begins to unleash his Full Power state.
127	51	"The Approaching Wall! The Final Barrier of Hope!!" / "The Approaching Wall! A Hopeful Final Barrier!"; Transliteration: "Semari-kuru Shōheki! Kibō wo Takushita Saigo no Baria!!" (Japanese: 迫りくる障壁！希望を託した最後のバリア！！)	Takahiro Imamura	Ken'ichi Yamashita	February 11, 2018	September 7, 2019
Jiren powers up to Full Power state. Goku, Vegeta, and Android 17 all attack him simultaneously, but he easily overpowers them. However, Android 17 manages to land a sneak attack and hurts Jiren. Jiren defeats Goku and Vegeta, while Frieza rejoins the fight and tries to kill Jiren in his Golden form. However, Frieza is easily defeated as well and knocked out once again. Android 17 asks Jiren what his wish on the Super Dragon Balls would be. Belmod explains that Jiren's endless pursuit of strength was inspired when his parents, most of his comrades, and mentor were killed by a powerful evil villain. However, his abandonment by his surviving friends turned Jiren into a loner who distrusted friendship. Jiren now focuses solely on increasing his own strength. This allows Android 17 to figure out Jiren's wish, which is to resurrect his former master. Android 17 admires Jiren's human qualities, but he accuses Jiren of using the rest of his universe's team for his own ends. Jiren rebuffs him and fires a powerful energy blast down at Android 17, Goku, and Vegeta. Android 17 uses an energy barrier to hold back Jiren's blast and forms force fields around Goku and Vegeta to protect them. Android 17 unleashes all of his energy to destroy Jiren's blast, while he seemingly self-destructs. Injured and exhausted, Goku is unable to stand up. Despite his exhausted state, Vegeta manages to get up to face off against Jiren. Vegeta declares that he will defeat Jiren.
128	52	"Noble Pride to the End! Vegeta Falls!" / "To the Noble, Proud End! Vegeta Falls!"; Transliteration: "Kedakai Hokori Saigo Made! Bejīta Chiru!!" (Japanese: 気高い誇り最後まで！ベジータ散る！！)	Masanori Satō	Toshio Yoshitaka	February 18, 2018	September 14, 2019
Vegeta prepares for a final stand against Jiren. Although Vegeta is too exhausted to turn into even a Super Saiyan, he still decides to take on Jiren. Jiren easily dodges his attacks and continues to pummel Vegeta. Jiren injures Vegeta's left eye in the process. Vegeta is knocked to the brink of elimination. Vegeta begins to think about the people in his life he cares about the most. Vegeta gets back up and continues to fight Jiren, who is impressed by Vegeta's pride. Vegeta nearly falls off the tournament stage again. Vegeta's boot catches onto a floating piece of rubble, which narrowly allows him to stay in the fight because the pieces of rubble still count as part of the tournament stage. Vegeta hears Bulma's voice urging him to fight on. Vegeta returns to fight Jiren once again. Jiren is unable to understand why Vegeta continues to fight him. Vegeta fires off a Final Flash, but Jiren is unfazed. Jiren knocks Vegeta off the tournament stage and eliminates him from the Tournament of Power. Although Vegeta is upset at being unable to last until the end, he gives Goku his remaining energy at the last second before falling off the tournament stage. Goku turns Super Saiyan Blue and begins to fight Jiren with his remaining power. Even with Vegeta's energy, Goku is still overwhelmed by Jiren. Goku is knocked back into his base form. When Goku is pushed back to the edge of the tournament stage and only one punch away from defeat, Vegeta shouts at Goku. Goku thinks about how the others have all put their faith in him. As Jiren delivers the final blow, Goku suddenly reactivates Ultra Instinct -Sign- and dodges the attack. With his new power, Goku is able to effortlessly dodge Jiren's attacks and lands a heavy blow on him. Both fighters face off and prepare for their final battle.
129	53	"Limits Super Surpassed! Ultra Instinct Mastered!!" / "A Transcendent Limit Break! Autonomous Ultra Instinct Mastered!"; Transliteration: "Genkai Chōzetsu Toppa! Migatte no Kiwamaru!!" (Japanese: 限界超絶突破！身勝手の極意極まる！！)	Masato Mitsuka	Atsuhiro Tomioka	March 4, 2018	September 21, 2019
Whis points out that since Goku has no allies to help him and no time to recover from the strain caused by Ultra Instinct -Sign-, this will be his last chance to end the final battle. Goku and Jiren resume their final battle, but Goku has the same problem he experienced with Kefla. Goku is unable to attack at his full potential. Goku tries the same trick he used on Kefla by powering up a Kamehameha while dodging and firing it at Jiren, but Jiren is able to block the attack and fire his own blast right through to Goku. Belmod is confident that Goku's Ultra Instinct -Sign- is a imperfect form and will not be enough to win but Vegeta points out that throughout the Tournament of Power all of the Saiyans have been able to surpass their limits and achieve higher levels of power. Belmod gets worried and shouts at Jiren to finish off Goku immediately. Jiren is able to trap Goku on a single floating rock and fires a barrage of attacks down at him in an attempt to knock him out, but Goku begins blocking Jiren's attacks with his own punches. Goku lands a solid blow on Jiren. Goku unleashes all of his power, which manifests as a galaxy-like nebula encompassing the entire area below the tournament stage. Jiren gathers all of his power and launches a final blast down at Goku, but Goku suddenly transforms again and powers up immensely. Goku easily nullifies Jiren's blast and jumps back up to the tournament stage. Jiren attacks again, but Goku easily overpowers him with a flurry of punches. Whis reveals that Goku has completed his ascension. Goku's hair and eyes have turned silver because he has finally reached the perfect form, Mastered Ultra Instinct.
130	54	"The Greatest Showdown of All Time! The Ultimate Survival Battle!"; Transliteration: "Kūzenzetsugo no Chō Kessen! Kyūkyoku no Sabaibaru Batoru!!" (Japanese: 空前絶後の超決戦！究極のサバイバルバトル！！)	Ryōta Nakamura	Hiroshi Yamaguchi	March 18, 2018	September 28, 2019
Having achieved Mastered Ultra Instinct, Goku overpowers and corners Jiren, which forces Jiren to break through his own limits and power ups his Full Power state even further to Super Full Power state. Goku and Jiren exchange attacks continuously. Despite almost being defeated twice, Goku stands up and recovers. Goku regains the edge over Jiren once again. When Jiren asks why Goku refuses to surrender, both Goku and his friends claim that the source of Goku's strength comes from the trust between him and his companions. Refusing to accept this and implications of his impending defeat, Jiren gets enraged and launches an attack on the bleachers in a desperate attempt to prove that friendship is meaningless. However, the attack is repelled by a furious Goku, who powers up even further and finally defeats Jiren with a Kamehameha. However, just as Goku is about to knock Jiren out, his body collapses from the strain of using Mastered Ultra Instinct for too long. Despite this opportunity, Jiren hesitates in knocking Goku off the tournament stage. Jiren leaves everyone from Universe Eleven in shock until Belmod reminds Jiren about the Super Dragon Balls and his ultimate wish. Though upset, Jiren decides to take the opportunity to eliminate Goku. Jiren admits to Goku that this was not how he wanted to win, but Goku will always live on in his memories even after he ceases to exist. Jiren blasts Goku off the tournament stage, but he is saved by Frieza in his True Golden form. Android 17 is also revealed to have survived his apparent self-destruction. As Frieza and Android 17 prepare themselves to face Jiren, Goku writhes in pain from the aftereffects of Mastered Ultra Instinct.
131	55	"A Miraculous Conclusion! Farewell, Goku! Until We Meet Again!"; Transliteration: "Kiseki no ketchaku! Saraba Goku! Mataauhimade!!" (Japanese: 奇跡の決着! さらば悟空! また会う日まで!!)	Megumi Ishitani	Atsuhiro Tomioka	March 25, 2018	October 5, 2019
With Goku down, Frieza and Android 17 are the only hopes to face off against Jiren. While Frieza takes the lead in the attack, Android 17 manages to injure Jiren with another surprise attack, who collapses from exhaustion. Frieza is about to eliminate Jiren, who accepts his impending defeat, but Top calls out to Jiren and inspires him to keep fighting despite his injuries. Jiren power ups to Super Full Power state once again and fires a massive blast at Frieza and Android 17. They form an energy barrier to shield themselves, but Frieza is running low on energy and drops out of his True Golden form. Before Jiren can overpower them, Goku manages to get back up and rejoins the others. Goku adds his strength to the barrier, which enables them to cancel out Jiren's blast. Goku and Frieza take on Jiren together, while Android 17 provides cover fire. Working together, Goku and Frieza overpower Jiren and tackle him off the tournament stage, which eliminates Goku, Frieza and Jiren from the Tournament of Power. With all of their fighters defeated, Universe Eleven is erased. As the only fighter remaining on the tournament stage, Universe Seven's Android 17 is declared the winner of the Tournament of Power, and is given the privilege of getting his wish granted from the Super Dragon Balls. After some consideration, Android 17 wishes to restore all of the universes that had been erased, which brings all their inhabitants back to life. As all the universes are restored, Jiren establishes a real friendship with Top and looks forward to having a rematch with Goku someday. The Grand Minister reveals that the Present Grand Zenō and Future Grand Zenō had foreseen the outcome of a virtuous being winning the Tournament of Power who would make a selfless wish on the Super Dragon Balls. The Grand Minister also stated that if the winner had made a selfish wish instead, then the two Zenōs would have erased the entire multiverse because this would have shown that the winning universe was no better than the erased universes, and that the universes excluded from the Tournament of Power were no more worthy of existing. As a reward for doing well in the Tournament of Power, Beerus asks Whis to restore Frieza to life, with Goku vowing to defeat him if he starts causing trouble again. After the tournament is over, Beerus, Whis, Shin, Elder Supreme Kai, Goku, and his nine team members from Universe Seven return home while Frieza leaves Earth. In the post-credits scene, Frieza resumes the leadership of his empire. Meanwhile on Earth, Goku and Vegeta meet for a sparring match in the place where they first fought while entering their Super Saiyan Blue forms. Goku reveals that he cannot use both Ultra Instinct -Sign- and Mastered Ultra Instinct at will since he believes that he obtained it by accident during the Tournament of Power. After the revelation, Goku and Vegeta declare that they will keep finding new levels of strength and face most powerful enemies.
